= The Shape of Things to Come (Lost) =

- Lost episode
- Steam rises from Ben as he awakens in the Sahara wearing the "Dharka"
- Episode no.: Season 4 Episode 9
- Directed by: Jack Bender
- Written by: Brian K. Vaughan; Drew Goddard
- Production code: 409
- Original air date: April 24, 2008
- Running time: 42 minutes

Guest appearances
- Sam Anderson as Bernard Nadler; Tania Raymonde as Alex; Alan Dale as Charles Widmore; Marc Vann as Dr. Ray; Kevin Durand as Martin Keamy; Faran Tahir as Ishmael Bakir; Yetide Badaki as Narjiss; Kaveh Kardan as Merchant3; Sean Douglas Hoban as Doug; Nick Hermz as Bedouin; Michael Sadler as Doorman; Sammy Sheik as Bedouin

Episode chronology
← Previous "Meet Kevin Johnson"	Next → "Something Nice Back Home"
- Lost season 4

"The Shape of Things to Come" is the 81st episode of the American Broadcasting Company's Lost and is the ninth episode of the fourth season. It aired on April 24, 2008 on ABC in the United States and on CTV in Canada. The episode was written by co-executive producer Drew Goddard and co-producer Brian K. Vaughan in late February 2008 and directed by executive producer Jack Bender in mid-March. The narrative centers on Ben Linus (played by Michael Emerson) as he and the Oceanic Airlines Flight 815 crash survivors at the Barracks come under attack in December 2004, while flashforwards to late 2005 show him recruiting Sayid Jarrah (Naveen Andrews) as a hitman and confronting his enemy Charles Widmore (Alan Dale).

"The Shape of Things to Come" is one of a few Lost episodes to contain footage filmed outside Hawaii. The episode aired as the first of the second batch of fourth-season episodes that were originally planned to air uninterrupted by a hiatus with the rest of the season; however, the 100-day 2007–2008 Writers Guild of America strike paused production and caused the writers to condense the second half of the season, which aired after a four-week break. "The Shape of Things to Come" received positive critical reviews, and the original broadcast in the United States was viewed by 14 million people. Much praise was directed at Emerson's acting skills, particularly in his reaction to the execution of his character's daughter Alex (Tania Raymonde). His performance in this specific episode received a nomination for Outstanding Supporting Actor in a Drama Series for the 60th Primetime Emmy Awards; the episode was also nominated in the category of Outstanding Sound Editing for a Series.

== Plot ==
The episode is set on December 27, 2004, the survivors' 97th day on the island. At the beach camp, the corpse of Dr. Ray (Marc Vann), the freighter Kahana's doctor, washes ashore. Daniel Faraday (Jeremy Davies) calls the freighter and asks what happened to Ray via morse code. Daniel lies about the response, saying that rescue helicopters will be sent soon; however, Bernard Nadler (Sam Anderson) calls him out on this and correctly interprets the freighter's message: "What are you talking about? The doctor is fine." Jack Shephard (Matthew Fox), who suffers from stomach pains throughout the day, forces Daniel to reveal that it was never their intention to rescue the survivors.

Meanwhile, Alex is captured by Martin Keamy (Kevin Durand) and others from the freighter. As they take her to the Barracks, she sets off an alarm heralding the arrival of Ben's enemies. Ben, John Locke (Terry O'Quinn), and Hugo "Hurley" Reyes (Jorge Garcia) fortify Ben's house, while James "Sawyer" Ford (Josh Holloway) goes to retrieve the other survivors in the Barracks. He is partially successful, as he saves Claire Littleton (Emilie de Ravin) from her exploded and burning house, but three survivors (portrayed by extras) are shot to death by the mercenaries. Keamy finds and frees Miles Straume (Ken Leung), giving him a walkie-talkie to take to Ben. Ben communicates with Keamy, who threatens to kill Alex if Ben does not surrender. Ben attempts to negotiate and is shocked when Keamy executes Alex. Locking himself in the house's secret room, Ben enters a hidden chamber. He re-emerges shortly after covered in soot, and the smoke monster attacks Keamy's henchmen. The survivors flee for the forest, with Ben lingering briefly to grieve over Alex's body. Afterward, Ben and Locke depart to locate Jacob for further instructions. Sawyer, Hurley, Claire and Aaron turn to return to the beach with Miles, but Locke holds them at gunpoint, successfully demanding that Hurley goes with him (as he has found Jacob's cabin before).

Flashforwards show Ben on three continents in autumn 2005. Ben is startled when he wakes up in the Sahara Desert wearing a winter jacket and with a large cut on his upper arm; challenged by two armed locals, he kills one of them (Nick Hermz) and knocks the other (Sammy Sheik) unconscious and travels on horseback to Tozeur, Tunisia on October 24, 2005. Ben journeys to Tikrit, Iraq, where the funeral of Sayid's wife Nadia Jazeem (Andrea Gabriel) is taking place. Ben tells Sayid that Widmore ordered Ishmael Bakir (Faran Tahir) to kill Nadia. Ben lures Bakir into a trap to be killed by Sayid, who shoots Bakir repeatedly. Ben recruits Sayid to become Ben's assassin, and leaves for London, where he breaks into Widmore's penthouse; although Ben cannot kill Widmore, he states that he is going to kill Widmore's daughter Penelope (Sonya Walger) in retribution for Alex's death. In their conversation, Widmore claims that the island is his and that he will take it back from Ben one day.

== Production ==
The Writers Guild of America went on strike on November 4, 2007, by which time only eight of the planned sixteen episodes of Lost's fourth season had been written. These episodes aired from January to March 2008. After the strike ended on February 12, 2008, the writers found that there was only enough time to produce five episodes, although the fifth episode would later be expanded to two episodes—and they proceeded to compress most of the storylines of the planned eight episodes into six, with some carrying over into the fifth season. Executive producer/head writer Damon Lindelof stated that "we are going to execute our full story plan for season four. This simply requires a shift from high-octane storytelling to superhigh-octane storytelling. It requires no cramming, only a slightly heavier foot on the gas pedal ... so, hold on to your hats. Those of you waiting for the long-anticipated [Jin Kwon (Daniel Dae Kim)] and Hurley Ping-Pong tournament, however, will be very disappointed." The writers expressed interest to air the eighth episode with the second batch of episodes, but ABC did not comply and "The Shape of Things to Come" served as the mid-season premiere. The writers realized some advantages to the strike: they were able to use actors whose shows had been canceled during the strike, and they were able to respond to confusion from the audience. They would later even conclude that the season was better as a result of the interruption, as they were able to discard "languid, contemplative material" and felt "recharged [with] a real energy to attack [the] last six episodes". The first three seasons were broadcast on Wednesdays in the United States and Canada; the pre-strike fourth-season episodes aired on Thursdays at 9:00 p.m., a time slot normally occupied by Grey's Anatomy. "The Shape of Things to Come" and the following three episodes were broadcast on Thursdays at 10:00 p.m., after Grey's Anatomy.

"The Shape of Things to Come" was written alongside "Something Nice Back Home" and "Cabin Fever" in February and March 2008. Its title is derived from the 1933 science fiction novel of the same name by H.G. Wells. Co-executive producer/writer Drew Goddard called the episode "maybe my favorite thing I've done on Lost, and I've been lucky with all the episodes I've gotten so far". Shooting began on March 10 and continued through March 25, alongside filming of "Something Nice Back Home". The scene in which Ben confronts Widmore was actually filmed in London, because actor Alan Dale was unable to fly to Hawaii as he had been appearing in a production of the play Spamalot. Several crew members and Michael Emerson flew to London to film the scene. A scene in which Claire has a prophetic vision was produced; however, it was cut due to runtime constraints.

A shoot-out early in the episode sees the end of the three background survivors who joined Locke in his trip to the Barracks in the early fourth season. One of them, Doug, was played by Sean Douglas Hoban, who received credit as a co-star for the first time in his run on the show, having been cast in the pilot as "Passenger #4". Hoban later also acted as a stunt double for Dominic Monaghan, who plays Charlie Pace, a major character in the first three seasons. Hoban has one line in "The Shape of Things to Come", and he had to audition for it against the other background actors.

The episode's flashforwards commence with Ben waking up alarmed in the Sahara with a wounded right arm and vapor rising from him. The Dharma Initiative parka that he wears was codenamed "Dharka" by the writers. A couple of Easter eggs are present in this scene: Ben's parka has a name tag that indicates that it was formerly owned by Edgar Halliwax (François Chau) and it displays the first appearance of the logo for a Dharma station called the "Orchid" that would not be seen until the episode titled "There's No Place Like Home". Another Easter egg is glimpsed in the next scene, when Ben reveals his forged Canadian passport previously seen in "The Economist" for his alias Dean Moriarty, which is also the name of the central character in Jack Kerouac's 1951 novel On the Road. Among the most frequent questions that the writers are asked is whether they have planned out future storylines, so the writers try to allude to future plot points, such as with the Dharka scene, that they can later call on as proof that they do know where the story is headed. Director Jack Bender described the scene, which was filmed in a Hawaiian rock quarry, as especially hard to shoot because the actors had to ride horses and use guns, the crew had to relocate due to rocks present that were unsuitable for the scene, and Bender walked head-first into a crane. Emerson stated that the set is "definitely a no-glamour zone ... I thought we would ease into things. Instead, I get this all-Ben extravaganza: combat, riding horses, foreign languages. And piano playing! All waaaay outside my comfort zone. How can you work two weeks and feel like you need a vacation already?"

== Reception ==
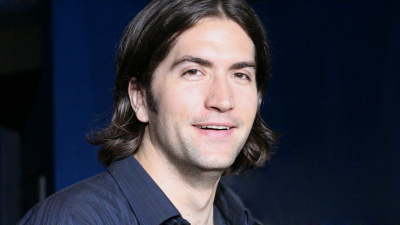
Co-executive producer Drew Goddard co-wrote the script.

"The Shape of Things to Come" was viewed in the United States live or within five hours of broadcast by 12.075 million people, ranking Lost as the fourteenth most watched program of the week. A total in the United States of 14.067 million people watched the episode live or within seven days; this number was factored into the season's average. This was an improvement over the previous Lost episode that had aired six weeks earlier. Lost also improved its Canadian ratings with 1.443 million viewers. In Australia, "The Shape of Things to Come" was watched by only 683,000 viewers, but Lost was nominated in the same week for two Sun-Herald Bogie Awards—a parody of the Australian Logie Awards—in the categories of "Most Underrated" series and "Most Jerked Around by the Networks".

"The Shape of Things to Come" received critical acclaim. Karla Peterson of The San Diego Union-Tribune gave "The Shape of Things to Come" an "A+." Jeff Jensen of Entertainment Weekly called "The Shape of Things to Come" "one of those deliciously dense episodes in which the nourishment of revelation is mixed with huge chunks of sugary intrigue" and speculated that the scene in which Alex is executed will be "sitting very high on this ranking of all-time pivotal Lost moments" by the series' May 2010 end. Before the season finale aired, Jensen ranked this as the second best moment of the season and put the scene in which the monster attacks the mercenaries in ninth place. Dan Kois and Lane Brown of New York magazine thought that this "episode didn't exactly feel like the usual moderately paced, secret-revealing drama Lost usually is; it felt like an action movie ... it was like watching Die Hard on an island". Chris Carabott of IGN gave the episode a 9.3/10, concluding that "if 'The Shape of Things to Come' is any indication of the level of quality that [the audience] should expect from here on out then we are in for some incredible storytelling" and "Alex's death will probably be remembered as one of the more pivotal scenes in the entire series [because] it is such a phenomenally shot, edited and acted moment ... it would be incredibly hard not to feel for [Ben] here." Upon grading the best episodes of the first five seasons, the episode ranked second, beating episodes like "Through the Looking Glass" and the pilot and losing to "The Constant." Erin Martell of AOL's TV Squad summed up "The Shape of Things to Come" as "a brilliant episode ... [with] tons of action, several big revelations, and more questions to ponder". Don Williams of BuddyTV decided that the episode was "worth waiting five weeks for" and "so jam packed that I need to give my brain time to rest". Williams's colleague Oscar Dahl ranked the scene in which Alex is killed as the fifth best moment of the season, noting that "it was perfectly paced ... and provided a huge shock ... and some of the best acting you'll ever see". Jay Glatfelter of The Huffington Post wrote that "'The Shape of Things to Come' was the perfect episode to get everyone back into the swing of Lost. It wasn't a mindfuck à la 'The Constant'. It was an edge-of-your-seat thrill ride, which to me matched the 'Pilot''s bombastic grandeur".

Alan Sepinwall of The Star-Ledger wrote that the episode "was overflowing with manna from post-strike heaven: lots of action, lots of intrigue [and] the odd answer or three"; however, he criticized the deaths of the three 815 survivors played by extras and survival of main characters, saying that "that sequence with Sawyer dodging bullets was supposed to be tense and frightening; instead, it was funny". Kristin Dos Santos of E! agreed with Sepinwall's latter assessment. Jamie Poniewozik of Time worried about the show's direction in which Widmore is suddenly the antagonist and Ben travels the globe to seek revenge. He said that it "looks a little too much like Alias"; Poniewozik enjoyed the island drama. Daniel of TMZ called "The Shape of Things to Come" "another solid episode of Lost", grading it as a "B" and claiming that "I enjoyed it the whole way through, even if it never gave me that 'OH MY GOD!!!!' moment, though I loved the Alex execution scene."

Before the episode began shooting, Michael Emerson had already decided to submit his performance in this episode for consideration in the Supporting Actor in a Drama Series category of the Primetime Emmy Awards because of the script's strength. He received his second consecutive Emmy nomination for this role; however, he lost to Željko Ivanek of the FX series Damages. Emerson won the next year for the episode "Dead Is Dead". Kevin Thompson of The Palm Beach Post wrote that "with those big ol' eyes of his, [Emerson] could always say more with a lengthy stare than he could with twenty pages of dialogue.... [He has], once again, proved why he has become Lost's star as well as its heart and soul.... an Emmy should belong to [him]." Jennifer Godwin of E! wrote that "no one has ever done better work humanizing a supervillain." Among those who also praised Emerson's performance as Ben were Robert Bianco of USA Today, Matt Roush of TV Guide, Ben Rawson-Jones of Digital Spy, who gave the episode a perfect rating of five stars, John Kubicek of BuddyTV and aforementioned critics from The Star-Ledger, The San Diego Union-Tribune, Time, Entertainment Weekly, IGN and TV Squad.
