= Something Nice Back Home =

- Lost episode
- Episode no.: Season 4 Episode 10
- Directed by: Stephen Williams
- Written by: Edward Kitsis; Adam Horowitz
- Production code: 410
- Original air date: May 1, 2008
- Running time: 43 minutes

Guest appearances
- Jeff Fahey as Frank Lapidus; Sam Anderson as Bernard Nadler; L. Scott Caldwell as Rose Nadler; Kevin Durand as Martin Keamy; John Terry as Christian Shephard; William Blanchette as Aaron; Bill Fiddler as Dr. Stillman; April Parker Jones as Dr. Erica Stevenson; Carla Von as Ms. Berenberg; Michelle Ruff as Jane (Voice, Uncredited)

Episode chronology
← Previous "The Shape of Things to Come"	Next → "Cabin Fever"
- Lost season 4

"Something Nice Back Home" is the tenth episode of the American Broadcasting Company's fourth season of the serial drama television series Lost and 82nd episode overall. It was aired on May 1, 2008, on ABC in the United States and on CTV in Canada. The episode was written in February and March by co-executive producers Edward Kitsis and Adam Horowitz and directed in March and April by supervising producer Stephen Williams. Critical reviews were mixed and the broadcast of "Something Nice Back Home" brought in 13 million American viewers, one of the smallest audiences for an original episode of Lost in the show's history.

The narrative begins on December 28, 2004, 98 days after the crash of Oceanic Airlines Flight 815. The leader of the survivors, Jack Shephard (played by Matthew Fox) develops appendicitis and Juliet Burke (Elizabeth Mitchell) operates on him. Meanwhile, James "Sawyer" Ford (Josh Holloway), Miles Straume (Ken Leung), Claire Littleton (Emilie de Ravin), and her baby Aaron continue their trek to the beach from the Barracks. In a flashforward, Jack experiences visions of his deceased father Christian Shephard (John Terry), while his relationship with Kate Austen (Evangeline Lilly) is strained soon after he proposes marriage. Kitsis said that the episode "was interesting because [it shows] a time, maybe brief, where Jack was happy."

== Plot ==
=== On the beach ===
After feeling ill for a day, Jack faints. Juliet diagnoses him with appendicitis and deems an appendectomy necessary. She sends Sun Kwon (Yunjin Kim) to get medical supplies from the Staff Dharma Initiative medical station. Sun is accompanied by Jin-Soo Kwon (Daniel Dae Kim), Daniel Faraday (Jeremy Davies) and Charlotte Lewis (Rebecca Mader); the latter pair are increasingly distrusted by the survivors. Jin realizes that Charlotte is fluent in Korean and confronts her after their successful trip, threatening to hurt Daniel if she continues to lie about her agenda and does not get Sun off the island. Jack convinces Juliet to allow him to remain awake during the surgery, with Kate holding a mirror, so that he can see and direct the surgery. As Juliet operates, Jack's consciousness proves to be a detriment and her nurse—dentist Bernard Nadler (Sam Anderson)—knocks him out with chloroform. The appendectomy is a success; afterwards, Juliet tells Kate that Jack really does love Kate and not Juliet. When Kate leaves, Juliet tells Jack that she knows he's awake, after which he opens his eyes.

=== In the Jungle ===
En route back to the beach camp, Sawyer, distrustful of Miles, gives him a "restraining order" to keep him away from Claire as they travel to the survivors' beach camp with Claire's infant son, Aaron. On their way, Miles discovers the partially buried bodies of Danielle Rousseau (Mira Furlan) and Karl (Blake Bashoff). They encounter Frank Lapidus (Jeff Fahey), who saves their lives by instructing them to hide from the nearby band of mercenaries led by Martin Keamy (Kevin Durand), who are revealed not to have been killed by the smoke monster in the previous episode. The mercenaries are on their way back to the helicopter to return to the freighter Kahana. At night, Miles watches Claire as she leaves with her deceased father, Christian. Sawyer awakes the next morning to find Aaron alone under a nearby tree and calls out for Claire with no response.

=== Flashforwards ===
In flashforwards, Jack has returned to work as a doctor in Los Angeles. He is engaged to Kate and lives with her while helping to raise Aaron (William Blanchette). Jack visits Hugo "Hurley" Reyes (Jorge Garcia), who is in a mental institution. Hurley has not been taking his medication and suffering from hallucinations of his deceased friend, Charlie Pace (Dominic Monaghan). He believes that the Oceanic Six have died and gone to heaven. Hurley gives Jack a message from Charlie: "You're not supposed to raise him." Charlie has also told Hurley that Jack will be receiving a visitor. On two separate occasions, Jack sees his father; Jack asks his colleague Erika Stevenson (April Parker Jones) to prescribe him the anti-anxiety drug clonazepam. After overhearing a phone call, Jack becomes suspicious of Kate. The next night, a heated argument ensues, in which she reveals that she is doing an errand for Sawyer, who Jack says is on the island by choice. Aaron walks into the room as Jack blurts out that Kate and Aaron are not related.

== Production ==
The episode was written by March 10, 2008 and was done alongside "The Shape of Things to Come" and "Cabin Fever". Shooting began by March 24, alongside filming of the previous episode and continued through April 4. The flashforwards were written partially to explain what led Jack to become the drug addict that he is in third-season finale's flashforwards, who believes that his father is alive. Matthew Fox stated that the fourth season is "starting to close the loop on the end of [the third] season. Jack in the future is a man marked by weakness, but the Jack [on the island in December 2004] is strong. ['Something Nice Back Home' explains] how he made that transition." When asked why Hurley does not take drugs to see Charlie, but Jack starts his drug addiction to try not to see Christian, Edward Kitsis said that "Jack has … always been a man of science, and there has to be something logical. The scene where Jack is staring at the bench where Hurley sits when Charlie visits him, I think in that moment he's thinking, my life right now is pretty good, I don't want to end up here." In regard to the contrast in Kate's character on the island and after the island, Kitsis said that "you could say [that] motherhood suits her. In the flashforwards … there's a sense of purpose to her, there's some clarity to her. There's so much devotion to that child, and she appears to be such a great mother … taking care of Aaron may have helped her put away some other issues."

== Reception ==
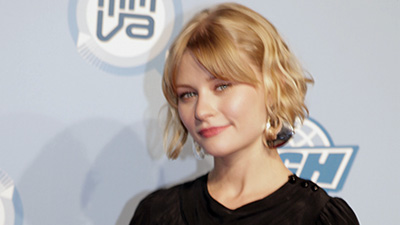
Critics of Entertainment Weekly and The Palm Beach Post speculated that Claire had been dead since the previous episode.

"Something Nice Back Home" was viewed live or recorded and watched within four hours of broadcast by 10.726 million American viewers, scoring a 4.7/13 in the key adults 18–49 demographic, ranking Lost as the twenty-first most watched series of the week and setting a ratings low for the series. A total of 12.946 million Americans watched the episode live or recorded it and watched it within seven days; this number was factored into the season's average. The episode was viewed by 1.322 million Canadians, making Lost the nineteenth most watched show of the week. 647,000 in the United Kingdom tuned in to the local broadcast. In Australia, "Something Nice Back Home" was watched by 505 000 people, having been moved to a later timeslot of 10.30 pm, outside the prime time viewing block.

Verne Gay of Newsday described it as "another fine, fine Lost". The San Diego Union-Tribune's Karla Peterson gave the episode an "A", calling it "one of those dense, chewy episodes in which a lot of stuff happened to a lot of people, and the foundation was laid for one hell of a season finale." She praised Fox, Evangeline Lilly, Jorge Garcia, Elizabeth Mitchell and Jeremy Davies's work in "Something Nice Back Home", while Tom Iacuzio of The Daytona Beach News-Journal deemed Jeremy Davies's performance deserving of an Emmy Award. The Palm Beach Post's Kevin Thompson "thought [that] Matthew [Fox] did a nice job conveying a wide range of emotions—scared, haunted, frustration, horny, jealousy, just to name a few." Jeff Jensen of Entertainment Weekly said that "Something Nice Back Home" "was partly a transitional passage in the Lost saga, a busywork episode designed to put all the characters in position for the year's big finale" and "[Jack's] appendicitis [was] the kind of hardcore castaway survival plotline we haven't really seen since season 1. Combined with a strong character-driven flash story, it was very old school Lost." Jensen also "liked how the episode neatly neutralized one of [his] least favorite season 4 moments, the Jack-Juliet smooch". TV Guide's Michael Ausiello wrote that "Fox quietly solidified his status as one of the tube's most reliable and unshowy stalwarts" and deemed him deserving of a Primetime Emmy Award nomination. Oscar Dahl of BuddyTV gave the episode a positive review, saying that he was "shocked and baffled" and writing that "Lost … can give me an exciting, well-done episode while making me fear where the series is going … [because] ghosts aren't my thing." The Huffington Post's Jay Glatfelter decided that "what made this episode great was the fact that it just contained so much story [with] Jack's flashforward [making] this one of his most interesting 'centric' episodes. … Not only was Jack's story interesting for a change, but the inclusion of [many] other characters … and giving them great story and character development [was also intriguing]." Daniel of TMZ graded "Something Nice Back Home" as a "B". In his recap, he wrote that "if that's the last we ever see of Claire again, that would be BEYOND awesome."

Robert Bianco of USA Today praised Fox's performance, saying that it was almost worthy of an Emmy Award nomination. The Star-Ledger's Alan Sepinwall gave the episode a mixed review, saying that "I find [Jack] and his love life simultaneously boring and obnoxious … [and] insufferable"; however, he enjoyed the subplots and commended the acting by Matthew Fox and Jorge Garcia. James Poniewozik of Time did not enjoy the flashforwards, commenting that they were "the first of the flashforwards that resembled one of the bad old flashbacks, in that it just reconfirmed character traits we already knew and showed Jack and Kate falling into patterns we knew from the past … I didn't get much from it". IGN's Chris Carabott gave the episode a 7.5/10, making it his least favorite episode of the season. Carabott wrote that "this season [Lost's main character Jack] seems to have been relegated to playing second fiddle … oddly enough, even in his own episode, Jack really isn't given much to do" and stated that "the possible rekindling of Jack and Kate's romantic relationship on the island is juxtaposed quite well with their relationship during the flashforward." Dan Compora of SyFy Portal wrote that "the pace … was a bit too slow" and "I usually like the Jack-centered episodes, but a bout of appendicitis simply does not make for high drama or stimulating action"; however, he noted that "all in all, this was a good episode, but it was nothing special." Compora praised Fox's increasingly good acting, but said that "this season has seen much stronger lead performances from Michael Emerson [in 'The Shape of Things to Come' as Ben Linus] and Henry Ian Cusick [as Desmond Hume in 'The Constant']." Erin Martell of AOL's TV Squad called "Something Nice Back Home" "a break after last week's action- and information-packed episode", argued that Rousseau was not given a proper death and enjoyed Rose and Bernard's roles. UGO's Sara shared Martell's sentiments in regard to Rose and Bernard's appearances and speculated that "Something Nice Back Home" would not be enjoyed by fans who like Rousseau or do not like Jack. Ben Rawson-Jones of Digital Spy gave the episode three out of five stars, saying that "the Jack-Kate romantic intrigue is rather dull, while the appendix plot feels like an unnecessary narrative obstacle for viewers to surmount."
