= The Other Woman (Lost) =

- Lost episode
- Episode no.: Season 4 Episode 6
- Directed by: Eric Laneuville
- Written by: Drew Goddard; Christina M. Kim
- Production code: 406
- Original air date: March 6, 2008
- Running time: 43 minutes

Guest appearances
- M. C. Gainey as Tom Friendly; Brett Cullen as Goodwin Stanhope; Alan Dale as Charles Widmore; Andrea Roth as Harper Stanhope

Episode chronology
← Previous "The Constant"	Next → "Ji Yeon"
- Lost season 4

"The Other Woman" is the 78th episode of the serial drama television series Lost and the sixth episode of the show's fourth season. It aired on March 6, 2008 on the American Broadcasting Company (ABC) in the United States and on CTV in Canada. The episode was written by co-executive producer Drew Goddard and executive story editor Christina M. Kim, and was directed by Eric Laneuville.

The narrative begins on December 24, 2004, 94 days after the crash of Oceanic Airlines Flight 815. Recent island arrivals Daniel Faraday (played by Jeremy Davies) and Charlotte Lewis (Rebecca Mader) leave the survivors' camp without notice for the Dharma Initiative electrical station called the Tempest. In flashbacks that depict events on the island, Juliet Burke (Elizabeth Mitchell) discovers that her boss Ben Linus (Michael Emerson), the leader of the island's original inhabitants referred to as the Others, is in love with her.

The writers advanced several story lines with "The Other Woman". The episode furthers Juliet's back story and relationships, sheds more light on the season's new characters, and features the first appearance of Harper Stanhope (Andrea Roth). The introduction of the Tempest further develops the series' mythology, specifically the "purge". In the third season, the purge was mentioned in episode "Enter 77" and seen in "The Man Behind the Curtain".

"The Other Woman" was watched by 15 million Americans and received mixed reviews. Critics from the Los Angeles Times, Entertainment Weekly, and BuddyTV deemed it the worst episode of the season, partially due to a flashback storyline that was seemingly recycled from the third-season episode, "One of Us". Another criticism was that audiences learned more about Ben than Juliet, despite the episode's focus on Juliet. Emerson received more praise for his acting than Mitchell, but Mitchell won a Saturn Award for her performance. Positive reviews commended the action in the episode's climax.

== Plot ==
The episode opens with flashbacks to Juliet's life on the island following her recruitment in by the Others. Juliet has an affair with an Other named Goodwin (Brett Cullen), who is married to Harper Stanhope. Harper discovers the affair, and warns Juliet that their leader Ben has a crush on Juliet and will punish Goodwin for the affair. Following the crash of Flight 815, Ben sends him to infiltrate a group of surviving passengers; Goodwin is killed by Ana Lucia Cortez after she realizes he is not a survivor. In October 2004, Ben invites Juliet to what he initially describes as a dinner party, but is actually a private date. Ben leads Juliet to Goodwin's impaled corpse, where she accuses him of having wanted Goodwin to die. Ben then reveals his love for her.

On the night of December 24, 2004 (three months after the crash of Flight 815), two members of a science team from the Kahana freighter anchored offshore—Daniel and Charlotte—sneak off to find the Tempest. Juliet and the crash survivors' leader Jack Shephard (Matthew Fox) notice their absence from the beach camp and pursue them. After hearing the whispers, Harper approaches Juliet. She tells her that Daniel and Charlotte intend to kill everyone on the island by deploying a lethal gas at the Tempest and that Ben's orders are for Juliet to kill them. On a trek back to the beach in the morning, Kate encounters Daniel and Charlotte and is knocked unconscious by the latter. Jack and Juliet come across Kate. While Jack is examining Kate’s wound, Juliet sneaks off and continues for the Tempest alone. Inside the station, Juliet finds Daniel in a hazmat suit at a computer. After a standoff, Daniel and Charlotte convince Juliet that they are not going to kill anyone; they are neutralizing the gas in case Ben decides to use it again, as he had twelve years earlier in an Others-led purge of Dharma. Jack arrives at the Tempest and Juliet explains that those on the freighter came to the island to wage war against Ben and she expects him to win. She fears for Jack because Ben thinks that she belongs to him, but Jack shows no worry and kisses her.

In the Barracks, Ben bargains with 815 survivor John Locke (Terry O'Quinn) for his freedom. He reveals that Charles Widmore (Alan Dale)—the father of Desmond Hume's (Henry Ian Cusick) girlfriend, Penny (Sonya Walger)—owns the freighter and hopes to exploit the island. Ben also tells Locke who his spy on the freighter is. Ben continues to reside in the Barracks following his release.

== Production ==
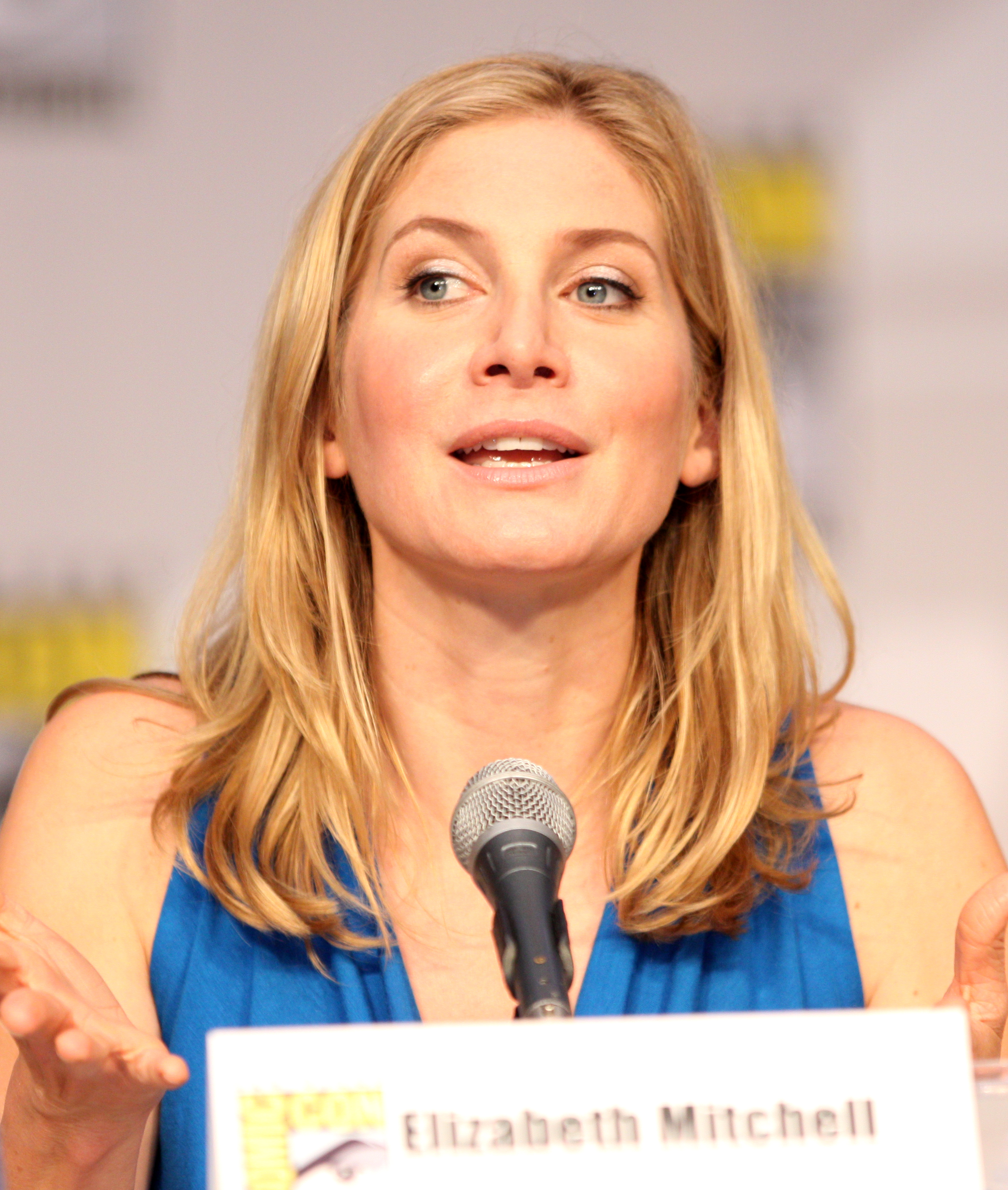
Mitchell, who portrayed Juliet in the episode

When asked about what she learned about her character through "The Other Woman", Elizabeth Mitchell surmised that Juliet's "mistakes are morally questionable, if not morally wrong. But you do see that behind this is a human being who is struggling to live and have a life that makes sense to her." Mitchell did not think that Juliet was too surprised that Ben has romantic feelings for her, but that the circumstances of receiving this information was horrifying because the character had just found out that Goodwin had died. Michael Emerson thought that his character Ben was childish when he shouted "you're mine!" to Juliet; Mitchell compared him to "a twelve-year-old boy throwing a temper tantrum over ... his first love". Mitchell was emotionally drained while shooting this episode because she was intimidated by Emerson and Matthew Fox's acting skills.

Co-executive producer and staff writer Adam Horowitz stated that "It's always interesting to pull back another layer on one of our characters, and to see another chapter in Juliet's story on the island and bring us to where she is now was great", while fellow co-executive producer and staff writer Edward Kitsis thought that "the interesting thing about the episode is the way Ben looks at Juliet ... everything is informed by that look." Horowitz also enjoyed the juxtaposition of Juliet's character development with the revelations on the "freighter folk". Kitsis picked the episode's final scene where Hugo "Hurley" Reyes (Jorge Garcia) and James "Sawyer" Ford (Josh Holloway) discover that Ben has negotiated his release and will be dining with them that evening as his favorite of the episode. Actress Rebecca Mader, who plays Charlotte, said that she was excited for the episode to air because she thought that it was better than the previous episode, which is widely regarded as one of the best episodes of the series. Charlotte knocks Kate unconscious with the barrel of her gun and asks "what?" to a speechless Daniel in "The Other Woman". Mader found this hilarious and described it as "the pinnacle of [her] career".

Andrea Roth makes her first and only appearance as Harper in "The Other Woman". During casting in early October, Harper was described as "a tough, no-nonsense and beautiful [therapist who has a tendency to be] overly controlling and obsessive." The character was initially slated to be a recurring role; however, Harper did not make another appearance in the season. The writers later stated that she would eventually reappear but this did not happen. A jungle scene with Mitchell, Fox and Roth was filmed until 4:00 a.m. on October 27, 2007, with industrial sprinklers and Mitchell referred to this as her "most intense experience on the show". Harper's appearance and disappearance in this scene are sudden so fans speculated that this was actually an apparition or manifestation of the island's black smoke monster. This was refuted by Lost's writers.

Named after William Shakespeare's 1610 play of the same name, the Tempest first appears in "The Other Woman" and is alluded to on an unseen layer of the Dharma "Swan" station's blast door map of the second season. The writers wanted to explain some of the island's history in the fourth season and decided that "The Other Woman" would reveal where the gas that Ben used came from and that Dharma had stations set up for protection against hostile forces. They also enjoyed having Goodwin on the show and wanted to bring him back. "The Other Woman" had commenced filming by October 11, 2007, and was completed on October 30.

"The Other Woman" contains Jack and Juliet's second kiss. Juliet was conceived by the writers as the next possible love interest for Jack after the death of the second season character Ana Lucia Cortez (Michelle Rodriguez). Fans hated Ana Lucia so the writers did not pursue the romantic story arc. Mitchell guesses that her character was created because "they needed a bridge between Ben and everyone else, and they needed someone to come in and be a little salt in the oyster of Jack and Kate." She believes that Juliet did genuinely fall in love with Jack, but not knowing whether "her attraction to Jack or her willingness to do anything to get off the island" is more important to her. Juliet forms something of a "love rectangle" with Jack, Kate and Sawyer. Mitchell "feel[s] like [Jack and Juliet have] a very grown-up relationship. They seem to really respect and like each other", whereas Sawyer and Kate are like "rambunctious teenagers". The couple gained an Internet fandom and was given the portmanteau nickname "Jacket".

== Reception ==
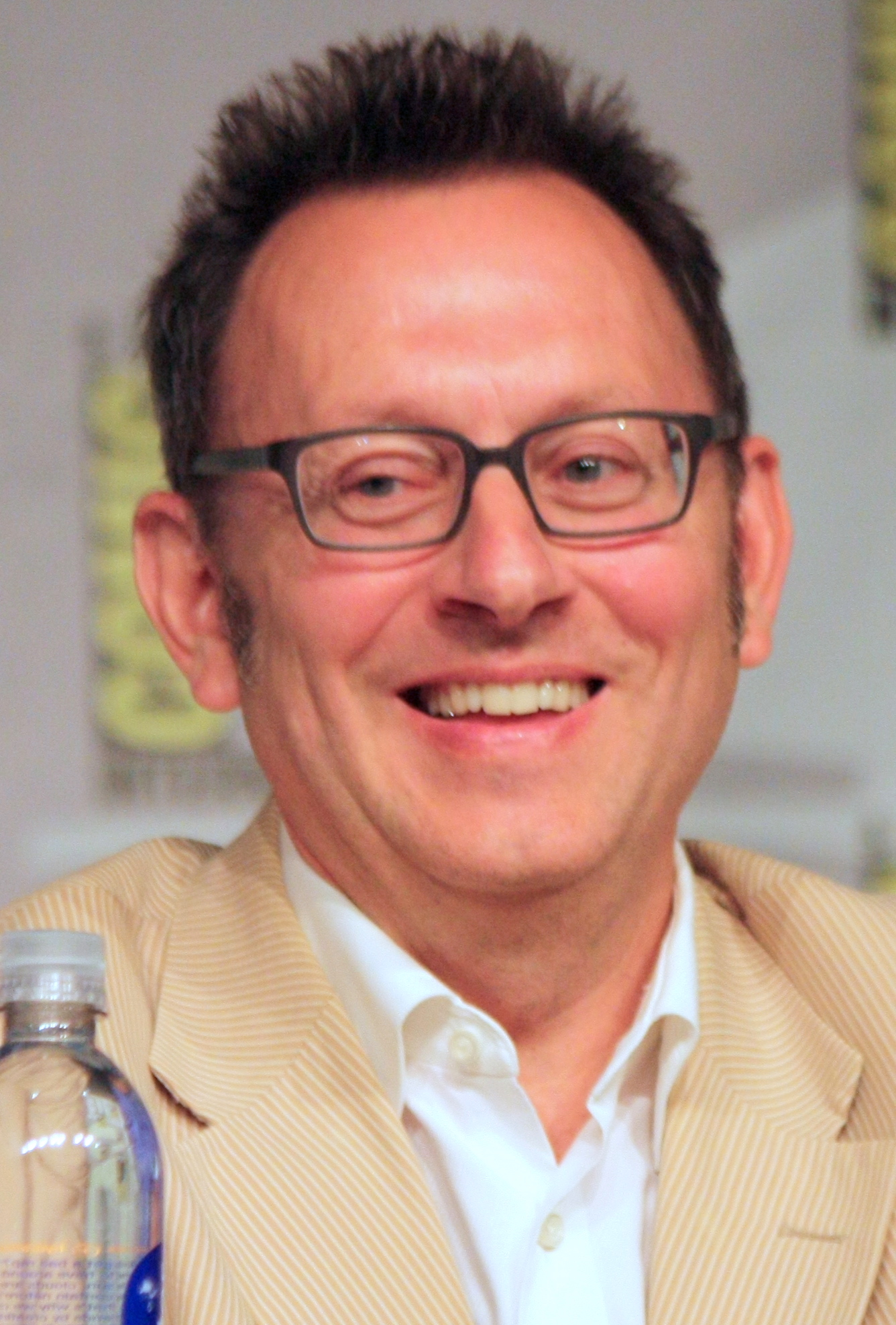
Critics agreed that Emerson's performance was a highlight of the episode.

"The Other Woman" was watched live or recorded and watched within five hours of broadcast by 13.008 million viewers in the United States, ranking seventh for the week in television programs with the most viewers and achieving a 5.4/13 in the coveted adults aged eighteen to forty-nine demographic. Including those who watched within seven days of broadcast, the episode was watched by a total of 14.933 million American viewers; this number went toward the season's average. 1.439 million Canadians watched it, making Lost the eighth highest-rated show of the week. In the United Kingdom, 1.1 million people viewed the episode. The episode brought in 691,000 viewers in Australia, placing it as the twenty-second most watched show of the night.

A common claim by critics was that more was learned about supporting player Ben than Juliet, the latter of which was centered on in flashbacks. Jeff Jensen of Entertainment Weekly praised Emerson's acting, while SyFy Portal's Dan Compora said that "The more I hate Ben, the more I realize that Michael Emerson is just a very fine actor doing his job." Oscar Dahl of BuddyTV called Emerson an acting "god" and said that while it was a Juliet-centric episode, [but] Ben made a bigger impression on him. Mitchell received the award for "Best Supporting Actress on Television" at the 34th Saturn Awards for her work in this episode.

"The Other Woman" has been cited as the weakest episode of Lost's fourth season. Despite his claim, Patrick Day of the Los Angeles Times pointed out that "even this so-so episode of Lost stood far above anything else being shown on network TV this season". He described Claire Littleton's (Emilie de Ravin) appearance as heartbreaking because it reminded him of how little the character had done to advance the season's plot. BuddyTV's John Kubicek said "The Other Woman" was the worst episode of the season so far because it focused on the romantic interests of major characters, while most of the show's audience watches the show for other aspects. Jeff Jensen of Entertainment Weekly graded the episode as a "C−" and called it "the only true dud of the season" and criticised the plot. He disliked Roth's performance as "unreal", while TV Guide's Bruce Fretts praised Roth's appearance. Maureen Ryan of Chicago Tribune said that "The Other Woman" was predictable and reused plot elements from previous seasons. The Star-Ledger's Alan Sepinwall considered the episode to be the second weakest of the fourth season after "Eggtown", criticizing the show for not previously explaining the purpose of the Tempest station and redundancy of Juliet's flashbacks.

"The Other Woman" was also the subject of mixed reviews. Tim Goodman of the San Francisco Chronicle wrote that the episode slowed down the pacing of the season, which was noticed by the audience. Time's James Poniewozik had mixed feelings for the flashbacks, but enjoyed Ben's character development. Nikki Stafford of Wizard "enjoyed" the "interesting" episode, although "not nearly as much" as the previous episode. She rejoiced at the return of Tom (M.C. Gainey) and wrote that "Locke used to be one of [her] favorite characters, but now he's a tool". Digital Spy's Ben Rawson-Jones stated that "the episode came together nicely in the end, with an expected twist and a snog, although for a great part it bordered on tedium. Juliet is a character who simply isn't interesting enough to fully sustain one's attention over a flashback. She's been so peripheral and irrelevant over this season, and it felt like a token gesture to foreground her at last. There was a nice pay off though, with a long awaited smooch between her and Jack." Daniel of TMZ graded the episode as a "C+"; however, he wrote that "the Ben/Locke scenes were great and Juliet in a bikini did not disappoint." TV Squad's Erin Martell was "not impressed with Jack and Juliet's chemistry" and found their kiss "unconvincing". Martell commended Emerson's acting, Ben's one-liners and his "too funny for words" casual greeting to Hurley and Sawyer at the end of the episode after he is released from captivity. The Huffington Post's Jay Glatfelter thought that "this was another great episode [that] could have lived up to last week's episode, but there was still a lot of solid character development."

Verne Gay of Newsday referred to the episode as "yet another brilliant outing by TV's best drama [that] keeps getting better"; she was not the only critic to give a positive review. E!'s Kristin Dos Santos thought that the fight scene between Juliet and Charlotte in the Tempest was "awesome" and suggested that Alan Dale receive a "lifetime achievement award for his parade of marvelously malicious patriarchs", such as Widmore. Chris Carabott of IGN gave the episode a score of eight out of ten and described it as "a good episode of Lost that has all the action, suspense and excitement that this show consistently delivers". Carabott wrote that "seeing how twisted [Ben and Juliet's] 'relationship' really is was fascinating". SyFy Portal's Dan Compora wrote that "this week's episode contributed to what is shaping up to be a pretty solid fourth season. … Fine acting carried the episode despite a few potholes in the plot." Compora also enjoyed the title and the physical altercation between Juliet and Charlotte.
