= Cabin Fever (Lost) =

- Lost episode
- John Locke (Terry O'Quinn) meets Christian Shephard (John Terry) inside Jacob's cabin.
- Episode no.: Season 4 Episode 11
- Directed by: Paul Edwards
- Written by: Elizabeth Sarnoff; Kyle Pennington
- Production code: 411
- Original air date: May 8, 2008
- Running time: 43 minutes

Guest appearances
- Jeff Fahey as Frank Lapidus; Lance Reddick as Matthew Abaddon; Marc Vann as Dr. Ray; Kevin Durand as Martin Keamy; Anthony Azizi as Omar; Grant Bowler as Captain Gault; John Terry as Christian Shephard; Holland Roden as Young Emily Locke; Rebecca Tilney as Ms. Locke; Amanda Carlin as Nurse; Kristen Dening as Nurse; Patrick Torres as Doctor; Doug Hutchison as Horace Goodspeed; Nestor Carbonell as Richard Alpert; Matthew Pedersen as Physical therapist; Mandy June Turpin as Florence; Sarah Duval as Melissa; Charles Henry Wyson as Young John Locke; Caleb Steinmeyer as Young John Locke; Phil Abrams as Mr. Gellert

Episode chronology
← Previous "Something Nice Back Home"	Next → "There's No Place Like Home"
- Lost season 4

"Cabin Fever" is the 11th episode of the fourth season of the drama television series Lost and 83rd episode overall. It was aired on May 8, 2008, on ABC in the United States and on CTV in Canada. The episode was written by supervising producer Elizabeth Sarnoff and Kyle Pennington and directed by Paul Edwards. According to a press release, "John Locke (Terry O'Quinn) is enlightened as to the whereabouts of Jacob's cabin, and life aboard the freighter becomes perilous." The episode was written alongside "The Shape of Things to Come" and "Something Nice Back Home". "Cabin Fever" was watched by 11 million American viewers.

== Plot ==
The episode begins with a flashback to 1956, when 16-year-old Emily Locke (Holland Roden) is preparing for a date with a man twice her age. Her mother tries to stop her from going out, but Emily leaves anyway and is struck by a car. The trauma triggers the premature birth of John (as an adult portrayed by Terry O'Quinn). John's life is monitored by Richard Alpert (Nestor Carbonell) (who at John's birth and throughout his childhood looks the same age as he does in present day) and Matthew Abaddon (Lance Reddick), each of whom attempts to influence his life. The existence of Mittelos Bioscience is revealed when John is invited to spend the summer there as a highly gifted high school student.

In the present day, Locke, Hugo "Hurley" Reyes (Jorge Garcia) and Benjamin Linus (Michael Emerson) are attempting to find a cabin inhabited by Jacob, the de facto leader of the Others. They are initially unsuccessful, but an apparition of deceased DHARMA Initiative member Horace Goodspeed (Doug Hutchison) assists Locke by pointing him to the Initiative's mass grave. There, Locke extracts a set of blueprints from Horace's jacket, and uses it to locate the cabin.

On the freighter Kahana, mercenary Martin Keamy (Kevin Durand) returns from his unsuccessful attack on the Barracks, the former home of the Others. Enraged that his mission was unsuccessful and several of his colleagues were killed, he accuses Gault (Grant Bowler) of giving him up to Ben, but Gault tells Keamy that Michael is the actual spy. He tries to kill Michael by shooting him, but just as in "Meet Kevin Johnson" when Michael tries to commit suicide, the gun jams. Gault then tells Keamy that Michael is vital to repairing the engines, because he is the one that sabotaged them initially. Sayid Jarrah (Naveen Andrews), fearing Keamy's intentions, uses a Zodiac boat to return to the island, hoping to save as many people as possible. Desmond refuses to accompany him, saying that he would never return to the island after he left.

Several hours after Sayid leaves, Keamy stages a mutiny. A soldier receives a message from the island saying they found the body of ship doctor Ray (Marc Vann) (as shown in "The Shape of Things to Come"), but the doctor protests that it's impossible since he's alive on the boat. Keamy orders Frank Lapidus (Jeff Fahey) at gunpoint to prepare the freighter's helicopter; Lapidus refuses, and Keamy kills the doctor and Gault in response. Lapidus acquiesces and Keamy leaves the freighter with a group of mercenaries, intending to "torch the Island". When the helicopter passes over the survivors' beach camp, Frank drops a bag containing a satellite phone onto the beach.

At the end of the episode, Locke enters the cabin alone and meets the figure of the deceased Christian Shephard (John Terry), who claims he is speaking on Jacob's behalf and is accompanied by his daughter Claire Littleton (Emilie de Ravin). Christian warns Locke that Keamy's mercenaries from the Kahana are already en route to the Island, and that the Island must be moved.

== Production ==
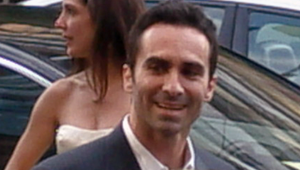
Carbonell returns to Lost in "Cabin Fever."

"Cabin Fever" was the fifth episode to be directed by Paul Edwards. It was the first installment to be written by Kyle Pennington, the eleventh by Elizabeth Sarnoff, and was the first that the two wrote together. Recurring guest star Nestor Carbonell appeared in seven episodes of Lost's third season as Richard Alpert and the mysteries surrounding his ageless character were heavily discussed among the fan community. While producing the final episodes of the third season, Carbonell was cast in a starring role on the new CBS series Cane. The writers modified their original story plan for the third season in anticipation for Carbonell's potential unavailability. Despite Carbonell's willingness to return to Lost, CBS president Nina Tassler ruled out another Lost guest appearance. Cane was canceled during the 2007–2008 Writers Guild of America strike, freeing Carbonell from his contract with CBS. Executive producer Carlton Cuse cited this as an unintended positive consequence of the strike.

== Reception ==
"Cabin Fever" was viewed live or recorded and watched within five hours of broadcast by 10.78 million American viewers. It attained a 4.7/13 in the key adults 18–49 demographic, ranking Lost as the nineteenth most watched program of the week, two places up from the previous episode, "Something Nice Back Home". "Cabin Fever" was watched by 392,000 Australian viewers, making Lost the thirty-third most watched program of the night.

Robin Abrahams of the Boston Globe published an analysis exploring disability on her blog. A paragraph analyzed the scene where the "disabled-in-the-eyes-of-others Hurley" and the "disabled-in-his-own-mind Ben" shared a candy bar, which she thought was "kind of good and ... awful"; she said "It was great to see the most hateful and most lovable characters sitting on a log sharing a chocolate bar." However, she thought that the scene did not use its full potential in emphasizing Hurley's empathy and Ben's reaction. However, Kristin Dos Santos of E!, who gave the episode a mostly positive review, was critical of the scene; she thought that the scene wasted time and was "cruel and unusual punishment" to air before the cliffhanger ending. Erin Martell from TV Squad stated "This episode put everyone, including the freighter folk, in place to carry out their plans. I'm already stoked for the finale".
