= Ji Yeon (Lost) =

- Lost episode
- Episode no.: Season 4 Episode 7
- Directed by: Stephen Semel
- Written by: Edward Kitsis; Adam Horowitz
- Production code: 407
- Original air date: March 13, 2008
- Running time: 42 minutes

Guest appearances
- Sam Anderson as Bernard Nadler; Zoë Bell as Regina; Jeff Fahey as Frank Lapidus; Kevin Durand as Martin Keamy; Marc Vann as Dr. Ray; Grant Bowler as Captain Gault; Lanny Joon as Dr. Bae; Simon Rhee as Shopkeeper; Christine Kim as Nurse; Lynette Garces as Nurse; David Yew as Security agent; George Kee Cheung as Ambassador

Episode chronology
← Previous "The Other Woman"	Next → "Meet Kevin Johnson"
- Lost season 4

"Ji Yeon" (/ˌdʒiː ˈjiːɒn/; from Korean 지연 [tɕi jʌn]) is the seventh episode of the American Broadcasting Company's fourth season of Lost and 79th episode overall. The episode was written by co-executive producers Edward Kitsis and Adam Horowitz, and directed by regular Lost editor Stephen Semel. It was first aired in the United States and Canada on March 13, 2008. It is the first episode to feature Harold Perrineau since his departure at the last episode of the second season, and features Zoë Bell as a guest star. "Ji Yeon" was watched by 12 million American viewers and received mostly positive reviews. Before the premiere of the fourth season, the principal cast of Lost called "Ji Yeon" the most shocking of the first seven episodes. The title of the episode is the name of Sun's daughter, and means "flower of wisdom."

The episode's story focuses on married couple Sun (Yunjin Kim) and Jin Kwon (Daniel Dae Kim). In late 2004, on the island, they debate whether to defect to the rival faction of survivors led by John Locke (Terry O'Quinn). Intercut throughout the episode, a series of off-island scenes show Sun about to give birth and Jin experiencing a series of difficulties in his efforts to reach the hospital with a gift of a stuffed panda. The ending shows that Jin's and Sun's scenes do not focus on the same birth; Jin's scenes are flashbacks to events before the plane crash, while Sun's are flashforwards to sometime after she escapes the island. A subplot follows Sayid Jarrah (Naveen Andrews) and Desmond Hume (Henry Ian Cusick) on board the Kahana, where they learn more about the freighter's mission and find somebody they once knew.

== Plot ==
=== Flashbacks/Flashforwards ===
The episode's off-island storyline seemingly depicts Jin rushing to the hospital while Sun, who has become one of the "Oceanic Six", goes into labor. Jin's journey to the hospital is marred by several unfortunate incidents, including difficulty in purchasing a stuffed panda and his cell phone being broken. Sun gives birth to a girl, who she names "Ji Yeon", the name chosen by Jin. The final off-island scenes establish that Jin and Sun's stories are separate; Jin's story is set in the past, two months into his marriage to Sun. He was rushing to the birth of a Chinese ambassador's grandson to deliver the panda as a gift on behalf of his employer, Sun's father. In the final flashforward, Sun and her daughter are visited by Hurley (Jorge Garcia), who takes her to pay her respects to Jin. His tombstone indicates that he died on the day of the crash of Oceanic 815.

=== On the island ===
Sun becomes increasingly worried and suspicious about the intentions of the Kahana crew. Despite Juliet Burke's (Elizabeth Mitchell) warning to Sun that women who conceive on the island die during their second trimester, Sun arranges to defect with Jin to the rival faction led by John Locke (Terry O'Quinn), who does not want to leave the island. Juliet tries to stop Sun from leaving by telling Jin that Sun had an affair, causing him to angrily back out of the journey at the last minute. After having a heartfelt conversation while fishing with Bernard Nadler, the only other married man on the island, he forgives Sun, who assures him that the baby is his.

=== On the Kahana ===
On the Kahana, Desmond and Sayid are still waiting to speak to the captain of the freighter, Gault (Grant Bowler). When they are taken to see him, Regina (Zoë Bell) jumps off the side of the ship, having wrapped herself in chains, but Gault dismisses it as "a heightened case of cabin fever", and asserts that losing her is better than losing several more in saving her. He says that he is employed by Charles Widmore (Alan Dale), Desmond's girlfriend's father, and later takes them into his cabin, and tells that Benjamin Linus (Michael Emerson) faked the plane crash by expending tremendous resources in the process and procured 324 dead bodies to make everybody believe that all the passengers were dead. Gault proceeds by saying that is one of the reasons why Mr. Widmore is keen on finding Benjamin Linus and the island. After their meeting, Desmond and Sayid are relocated to a different part of the ship, where they meet Michael Dawson (Harold Perrineau, Jr.), who has not appeared since the second season finale, working as a deckhand under the alias "Kevin Johnson".

== Production ==
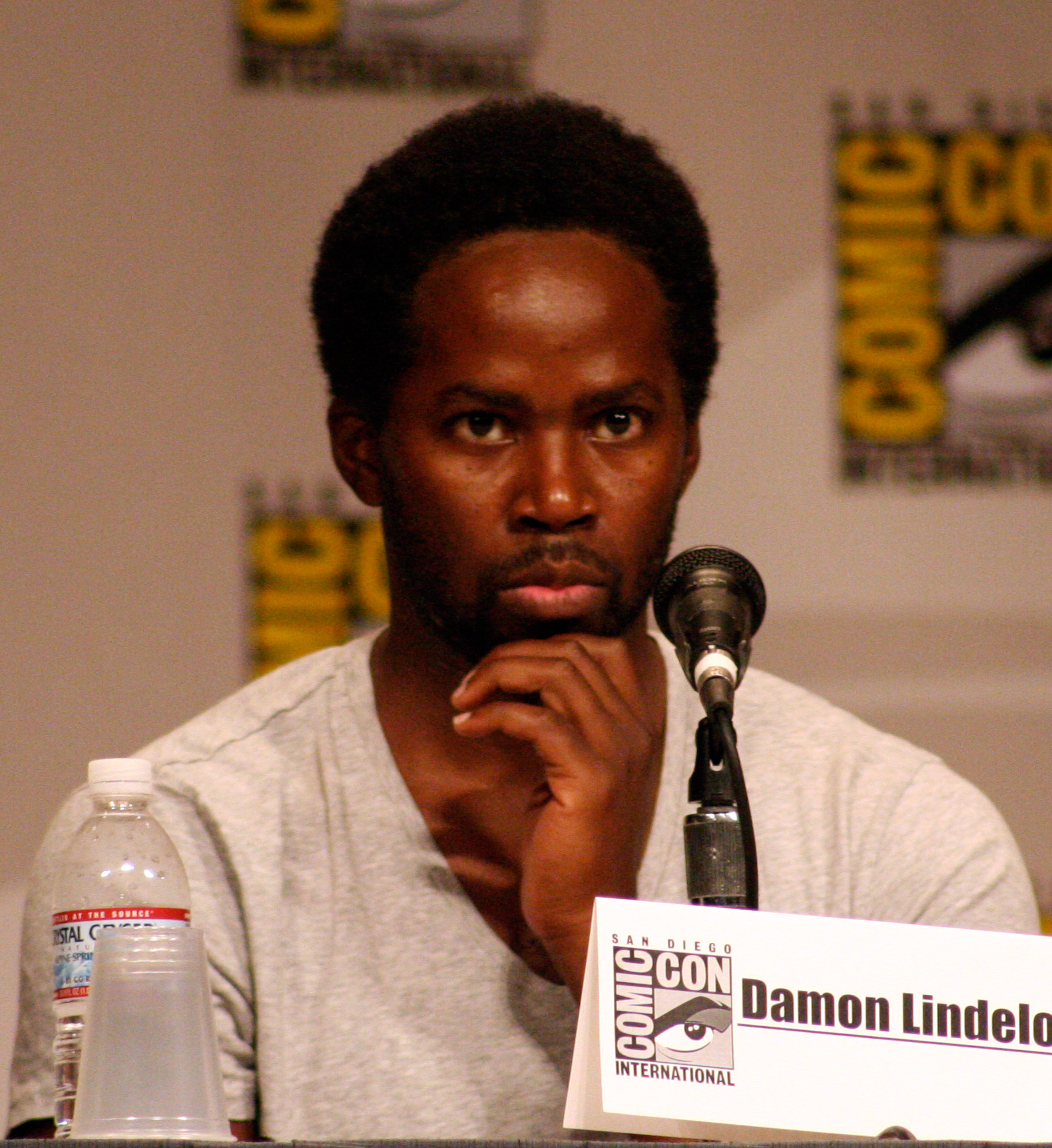
"Ji Yeon" marked the return of Perrineau's character, following a two-year absence.

The episode was filmed in late October and early November 2007, primarily on the island of Oahu, where Lost is filmed. Several days before shooting, Daniel Dae Kim was arrested for driving under the influence of alcohol. His arrest prompted speculation about his future on the series, due to co-stars Michelle Rodriguez (Ana-Lucia Cortez) and Cynthia Watros (Libby) having left Lost after DUI arrests. With the revelation of Sun as one of the Oceanic Six, all six members have been revealed. Executive producers and writers Carlton Cuse and Damon Lindelof left the identity of the sixth deliberately ambiguous to provoke debate after the episode.

"Ji Yeon" is the first episode since the second season finale, "Live Together, Die Alone", in which Harold Perrineau, Jr. appears as Michael Dawson. Perrineau was the only actor from the original cast of fourteen not to appear in the third season of Lost. Perrineau was "really hurt" by the creative decision to leave him out, and went on to appear in the British horror film 28 Weeks Later and Demons, a pilot for CBS. When the latter was not picked up by CBS, Perrineau returned to Lost; his return was confirmed during Lost's slot at the 2007 Comic-Con International.

== Reception ==
"Ji Yeon" was watched live or recorded and watched within six hours of broadcast by 12.083 million viewers in the United States, achieving a 4.9/13 in the key adults 18–49 demographic and ranking fourth for the week in viewers. The episode brought in 689 000 viewers in Australia and was in the top five key adults 25–54 and 18–49 demographics for the night.

Mark Madley of the National Post praised the episode for "[continuing] the near-perfect season four". He asked, "Has there ever been an episode that answered so many questions yet advanced the plot so little?", but immediately noted that the question was not negative. He also found Jin's line, "I will hunt you down and rip your head off!" particularly humorous. Tim Goodman, critic for the San Francisco Chronicle, thought highly of the romantic plot of the episode and more generally the characters of Jin and Sun, noting that "Lost has always treated the Jin and Sun relationship with both interest and respect" and "few primetime televised portrayals of intimacy among Asians have been this well done." Matt Roush of TV Guide stated that the episode made him cry, the "ultimate compliment in the Roush playbook". Later in his review, he commented he was "already a puddle of emotion before the climactic reveal". Television Without Pity's LTG gave the episode an "A−", called it "trippy" and "confusing" and also praised Yunjin Kim and Daniel Dae Kim's performances as "fantastic".
