= Lost season 4 =

Season of television series

Lost
- Season 4
- DVD cover
- Showrunners: Damon Lindelof; Carlton Cuse
- Starring: Naveen Andrews; Henry Ian Cusick; Jeremy Davies; Emilie de Ravin; Michael Emerson; Matthew Fox; Jorge Garcia; Josh Holloway; Daniel Dae Kim; Yunjin Kim; Ken Leung; Evangeline Lilly; Rebecca Mader; Elizabeth Mitchell; Dominic Monaghan; Terry O'Quinn; Harold Perrineau
- No. of episodes: 14

Release
- Original network: ABC
- Original release: January 31 – May 29, 2008

Season chronology
- ← Previous; Season 3 Next → Season 5

The fourth season of the American serial drama television series Lost commenced airing on the ABC network in the United States, and on CTV in Canada on January 31, 2008, and concluded on May 29, 2008. The season continues the stories of a group of over 40 people who have been stranded on a remote island in the South Pacific, after their airplane crashed there more than 90 days prior to the beginning of the season. During the season, the castaways are joined by both mercenaries and scientists from a freighter stationed near the island. According to Lost's executive producers/writers/showrunners Damon Lindelof and Carlton Cuse, there are two main themes in the fourth season: "the castaways' relationship to the freighter folk" and "who gets off the island and the fact that they need to get back". Filming began on August 17, 2007, and given the Writers Guild of America went on strike right as the show was making the eighth episode in November, once that episode was finished production was halted until the strike was solved in February 2008 and more screenplays could be done. As a result of shortening the remaining schedule, the planned eight episodes were to reduced to five, ultimately six once the longer season finale was split into two parts.

The fourth season aired Thursdays at 9:00 pm from January 31 to March 20, 2008, and at 10:00 pm from April 24 to May 15, 2008. The two-hour finale aired at 9:00 pm on May 29, 2008. Buena Vista Home Entertainment (under the ABC Studios label) released the season on DVD and Blu-ray Disc under the title Lost: The Complete Fourth Season – The Expanded Experience on December 9, 2008, in Region 1; however, it was released earlier—on October 20, 2008—in Region 2. It was contemporaneously acclaimed for its flash-forwards, pace and new characters.

== Episodes ==
"Featured character(s)" refers to the character(s) who is centered on in the episode's flashbacks or flashforwards. A clip-show recapping the first three seasons titled "Lost: Past, Present & Future" preceded the season premiere episode.

No. overall	No. in season	Title	Directed by	Written by	Featured character(s)	Original release date	U.S. viewers (millions)
73	1	"The Beginning of the End"	Jack Bender	Damon Lindelof & Carlton Cuse	Hurley	January 31, 2008	16.14
Desmond informs the survivors of Charlie's death and warning about the Kahana boat. (Note: As depicted in "Through the Looking Glass".) The badly wounded Naomi Dorrit calls the Kahana before dying. Hurley gets lost in the jungle and finds Jacob's cabin, seeing Christian Shephard inside. When the survivors regroup, Jack attempts to kill Locke, who gathers a small group that includes the Littletons, the Rousseaus, and Sawyer. They head for the Barracks as Locke insists that everyone is in danger. After they leave, physicist Daniel Faraday parachutes down to the island and asks for Jack. In the future, Hurley voluntarily commits himself to Santa Rosa after being haunted by visions of Charlie, who insists that "they need you." Oceanic lawyer Michael Abaddon visits to offer Hurley assistance, though Hurley is unnerved by him. Jack visits and asks if Hurley is "going to tell," and insists he will never return to the island.
74	2	"Confirmed Dead"	Stephen Williams	Drew Goddard & Brian K. Vaughan	Faraday, Charlotte, Miles, Frank	February 7, 2008	15.29
Abaddon assigns Daniel, medium Miles Straume, anthropologist Charlotte Lewis, and the original pilot of Oceanic Flight 815, Frank Lapidus, to go with Naomi to the island. In the present, Daniel introduces himself and explains that his team has GPS locators on them. They find Miles, who mistrusts them as Naomi's final message was a secret distress code. They encounter Lapidus, who landed their lightning-struck helicopter intact, and he notes that Juliet was not on Flight 815, mentioning that he memorized the manifest. Miles demands she take them to Ben, revealing that the team is searching for him. As Locke searches for the cabin, Charlotte lands nearby and a captive Ben shoots her with a stolen gun, though she is saved by her bulletproof vest. Locke prepares to kill him until Ben reveals he has a mole on the Kahana.
75	3	"The Economist"	Jack Bender	Edward Kitsis & Adam Horowitz	Sayid	February 14, 2008	13.76
Sayid promises to retrieve Charlotte peacefully if he gets a spot on the helicopter, taking Kate and Miles with him. Unable to find the cabin, Locke leads his group to the Barracks, where he gets the drop on Sayid's group. Kate defects to Locke's side, knowing she would be arrested for her crimes upon returning to the mainland, and Sayid trades Miles for Charlotte. Daniel calls the Kahana and it shoots a projectile onto the island, and he determines that time on the island is out of sync with time on the boat. In the future, Sayid works as a hitman and seduces a woman to get closer to her boss, "the economist." She turns out to also be an assassin, forcing him to kill her. Sayid returns to his handler, Ben, who asserts that he is killing people to keep his returned friends, the "Oceanic Six", safe.
76	4	"Eggtown"	Stephen Williams	Elizabeth Sarnoff & Greggory Nations	Kate	February 21, 2008	13.65
Kate agrees to get Miles an audience with Ben, and Miles gives him a week to come up with $3.2 million in exchange for telling his employer he is dead. Locke catches them and banishes Kate from the Barracks. In the future, Kate is tried for her crimes and Jack is called as a character witness; he claims that only eight people survived the crash and Kate was largely responsible for saving the survivors. Kate refuses to reconcile with a remorseful Diane Janssen and takes a plea deal of ten years probation so she can continue raising Aaron Littleton as her son.
77	5	"The Constant"	Jack Bender	Carlton Cuse & Damon Lindelof	Desmond	February 28, 2008	12.89
As the helicopter lands on the Kahana, Desmond slips back to 1996. He is taken to the sick bay, where a crew member is also experiencing "temporal displacement." Sayid calls Daniel, who tells Desmond to find him at Oxford in 1996. He does, and Daniel shows him his time experiments and warns him to find a "constant," someone who is present in both periods of his life, to anchor him to reality. While the ailing man dies, Desmond tracks down Penny Widmore in 1996 and tries to make amends, promising to call her on Christmas Eve of 2004 and leave her alone until then. Back in the present, he makes the call and learns that she has been looking for him since his disappearance. They affirm their love, saving him. Daniel, who suffers from short-term memory loss, finds a note in his journal naming Desmond as his constant.
78	6	"The Other Woman"	Eric Laneuville	Drew Goddard & Christina M. Kim	Juliet	March 6, 2008	13.01
Juliet has an affair with Goodwin Stanhope, and when he dies, (Note: As depicted in "The Other 48 Days".) Ben takes her to see his body. She accuses him of setting Goodwin up to die, and Ben affirms that she belongs to him. In the present, Daniel and Charlotte sneak off and Goodwin's widow warns Juliet that they are going to the "Tempest" station, which the Others used in the purge to gas DHARMA. (Note: As depicted in "The Man Behind the Curtain".) She finds them at the Tempest just as Daniel is using its computer, but they convince her that they are neutralizing the gas to prevent Ben from using it. Juliet admits to Jack her fear that Ben will kill him because of her, and they kiss. Ben informs Locke that the Kahana belongs to Charles Widmore, and when he reveals who his man on the boat is, he is allowed to live comfortably with the survivors.
79	7	"Ji Yeon"	Stephen Semel	Edward Kitsis & Adam Horowitz	Sun & Jin	March 13, 2008	12.08
Kahana captain Gault explains to Desmond and Sayid the boat is owned by Widmore, who faked the plane crash found by the outside world (Note: As depicted in "D.O.C.".) to avoid bringing attention to the island. As they leave, they encounter Michael working as a deckhand under an alias. Scared of the Kahana crew, Sun decides to defect to Locke, and Juliet reveals her past infidelity (Note: As depicted in "D.O.C.".) to Jin to provoke him into staying. Jin forgives her and she promises their baby is his, deciding to stay with him on the beach. In the future, Sun goes into labor while Jin frantically tries to get across town, only for it to be revealed that Jin's story is a flashback of him working a job for Woo-Jung Paik. After giving birth to her daughter Ji Yeon, Sun takes her and a visiting Hurley to pay respects at Jin's grave.
80	8	"Meet Kevin Johnson"	Stephen Williams	Elizabeth Sarnoff & Brian K. Vaughan	Michael	March 20, 2008	11.46
After leaving the island, (Note: As depicted in "Live Together, Die Alone".) Walt cuts contact with Michael when he admits to murdering Libby and Ana Lucia. (Note: As depicted in "Two for the Road".) A suicidal Michael is approached by Tom Friendly, who explains that the island's power prevents the death of people important to it and convinces him to atone by blowing up the Kahana. Ben calls him once he is aboard and instructs him to make a list of all the people on the boat. In the present, Sayid, furious that Michael is working for Ben, exposes his duplicity to Gault. Ben informs Locke's group that Michael is his spy, and privately warns Alex Rousseau to take refuge in the Temple. She leaves with Karl Martin and Danielle Rousseau, who are killed by Widmore's mercenary squadron, led by Martin Keamy. Alex bargains for her life by revealing herself as Ben's daughter.
81	9	"The Shape of Things to Come"	Jack Bender	Brian K. Vaughan & Drew Goddard	Ben	April 24, 2008	12.08
The body of the Kahana doctor, Ray, washes up on the beach. Daniel calls the boat and tells the survivors that rescue is on the way, but Bernard Nadler translates the message's morse code and reveals he is lying. Jack presses him into admitting that the survivors's rescue was never a part of their mission. Keamy's men kill most of Locke's group and he kills Alex when Ben refuses to surrender, so Ben summons the smoke monster in a tunnel under his house to fend off Keamy's men. He and Locke force Hurley to search for the cabin. In the future, Ben awakens in a Tunisian desert and travels to Iraq, where Nadia Jaseem has been killed by one of Widmore's agents after marrying Sayid. He sets up the killer to be killed by Sayid and recruits him as his assassin, then goes to meet Widmore and promises to kill Penny. Widmore resolves to regain control of the island.
82	10	"Something Nice Back Home"	Stephen Williams	Edward Kitsis & Adam Horowitz	Jack	May 1, 2008	10.73
Jack comes down with appendicitis. Juliet sends Charlotte and the Kwons to the Staff to get medical supplies, where Jin realizes Charlotte speaks Korean and threatens her into making sure Sun gets on the helicopter. After the surgery, Juliet tells Kate about her and Jack's kiss, which she believes he did to confirm that he loves Kate instead. Claire is led away from the survivors of Locke's group by a vision of Christian, leaving Aaron behind. In the future, Jack has a domestic life with Kate and Aaron. He visits Hurley, who relays a message from Charlie that "you're not supposed to raise him." As Jack sees visions of Christian, he relapses into alcoholism and argues with Kate when she runs an errand for Sawyer. Aaron overhears Jack reminding Kate that she is not his real mother, and she tells Jack to leave them.
83	11	"Cabin Fever"	Paul Edwards	Elizabeth Sarnoff & Kyle Pennington	Locke	May 8, 2008	10.78
Locke is abandoned by his teenage mother at birth and is approached by Richard, who asks him to pick from a series of items and leaves abruptly when he chooses a knife. He also encounters Abaddon during physical therapy. In the present, an unstable Keamy returns to the Kahana, and Gault complies with Sayid's request to sneak him off the boat. After receiving Daniel's message about Ray's death, Keamy kills him and throws his body overboard. He kills Gault for interfering and forces Lapidus to fly his team to the island, who tosses a satellite phone onto the beach as they fly overhead. Locke has a vision of Horace Goodspeed and goes to the purge grave, finding a set of blueprints on Goodspeed's body. He uses them to find the cabin, where Christian, sitting with Claire, speaks for Jacob. Locke informs Ben that "we need to move the island."
84	12	"There's No Place Like Home (Part 1)"	Stephen Williams	Damon Lindelof & Carlton Cuse	Jack, Hurley, Sayid, Sun, Kate	May 15, 2008	10.96
Ben heads to the "Orchid" station, where Keamy's team is waiting, and he surrenders after signaling the Others. Jack and Sawyer follow Lapidus's signal to the helicopter, while Sayid arrives on the beach and informs the survivors that the mercenaries will use the Orchid to kill everyone. Daniel takes a group that includes Aaron and the Kwons to the Kahana, where Michael has discovered a bomb on board. In the future, the Six are flown back to America after being rescued. During a press conference, they claim to be the only survivors of the crash. Sun uses her settlement money to take over Woo-Jung's company, and Jack learns from Carole Littleton at Christian's funeral that Claire is his half-sister.
85	13	"There's No Place Like Home (Parts 2 & 3)"	Jack Bender	Carlton Cuse & Damon Lindelof	Jack, Hurley, Sayid, Sun, Kate	May 29, 2008	12.30
86	14	"There's No Place Like Home (Parts 2 & 3)"	Jack Bender	Carlton Cuse & Damon Lindelof	Jack, Hurley, Sayid, Sun, Kate	May 29, 2008	12.30
Jack goes to the Orchid to get Hurley, where Locke asks him to lie about the crash if he escapes. The Others ambush and kill Keamy's men and the helicopter takes off. It runs low on fuel, so Sawyer asks Kate to "tell her I'm sorry" before jumping out to reduce weight and swimming back to the island. Keamy follows Ben and Locke under the Orchid where Ben kills him, triggering a dead man's switch. The helicopter leaves with the Six and Desmond, but Michael and Jin are on the boat when it explodes. Ben gives Locke command over the Others and breaks into a hidden room with a giant wheel. When he turns it, he is sent several months forward in time to Tunisia, while the island disappears as the helicopter tries to return to it. The inhabitants get on a raft and are found by Penny's boat. She drops the Six off near an island to be rescued. In the future, Sayid breaks into Santa Rosa and asks Hurley to come with him. Jack returns to the coffin (Note: Shown in "Through the Looking Glass".) and meets Ben, who tells him he needs to bring everyone who left back to the island, including the man in the coffin, Locke.

== Cast ==
The fourth season featured sixteen major roles with star billing. The show continues to chronicle the lives of the survivors of the crash of Oceanic Airlines Flight 815; the survivors' interactions with the island's original inhabitants, whom they refer to as "the Others"; and a group of people who arrived on a freighter. The list is ordered by actors' last names, with brief summaries of the characters.

=== Main ===
- Naveen Andrews as 815 survivor Sayid Jarrah, a former soldier of the Iraqi Republican Guard.
- Henry Ian Cusick as Desmond Hume, a man who has been living on the island for three years and who has developed the ability to time travel, though this is beyond his control.
- Jeremy Davies as Daniel Faraday, a socially awkward physicist from the freighter.
- Emilie de Ravin as single new mother Claire Littleton of Flight 815.
- Michael Emerson as Ben Linus, the leader of the Others.
- Matthew Fox as Dr. Jack Shephard, the leader of the castaways.
- Jorge Garcia as unlucky millionaire and mentally unstable Hugo "Hurley" Reyes, one of Jack's fellow survivors of 815.
- Josh Holloway as the sardonic 815 survivor James "Sawyer" Ford.
- Daniel Dae Kim as the non-English speaking Jin Kwon
- Yunjin Kim as Jin's pregnant wife Sun.
- Ken Leung as Miles Straume, an arrogant medium from the freighter.
- Evangeline Lilly as fugitive Kate Austen.
- Rebecca Mader as anthropologist Charlotte Lewis from the freighter.
- Elizabeth Mitchell as fertility specialist Juliet Burke, a woman recruited by the Others who joins the 815 survivors in the third season and becomes involved in a love square with Jack, Kate and Sawyer.
- Dominic Monaghan as Charlie Pace. Monaghan only received star billing in the episode in which he appeared.
- Terry O'Quinn as John Locke, an 815 survivor with a deep connection to the island.
- Harold Perrineau as Flight 815 survivor Michael Dawson, who returns aboard the freighter undercover for Ben as a deckhand, after escaping the island in Season 2.

=== Recurring ===
- Sam Anderson as Bernard Nadler, a survivor of Oceanic Flight 815, who is Rose's husband
- Anthony Azizi plays Omar, a mercenary on the Kahana
- Blake Bashoff as Karl, an Other, who is Alex's boyfriend
- Zoë Bell as Regina, a crew member of Kahana, who is involved with communications between the freighter and the island
- Grant Bowler as Gault, the captain of the Kahana, which is a freighter sent on a mission to find the island
- L. Scott Caldwell as Rose Henderson, a survivor of Oceanic Flight 815, who is Bernard's wife
- Nestor Carbonell as Richard Alpert, an Other, who does not age. While Ben is held in captivity, Richard is the leader of the Others.
- Alan Dale as Charles Widmore, the man who funds the Kahana mission. He is also Penelope "Penny" Widmore's father.
- Mira Furlan as Danielle Rousseau, a marooned island inhabitant of sixteen years, who is reunited with her sixteen-year-old daughter, Alex
- Kevin Durand as Martin Keamy, the leader of the team of mercenaries on the Kahana
- Jeff Fahey as Frank Lapidus, who was supposed to be the pilot of Oceanic Flight 815, but he was replaced.
- Malcolm David Kelley as Walt Lloyd, a survivor of Oceanic Flight 815
- Tania Raymonde as Alexandra "Alex" Rousseau. She is the biological daughter of Danielle Rousseau. She was kidnapped as a baby. Ben raised her and told her that she was his daughter.
- Lance Reddick as Matthew Abaddon, a mysterious man with connections to Naomi, Hurley, and Locke.
- Fisher Stevens as George Minkowski, a crew member of Kahana, who is involved with communications between the freighter and the island
- John Terry as Christian Shephard, who is Claire's and Jack's biological father. Claire does not meet him until she is a teenager or young adult. Jack does not know he has a half sister until he is an adult.
- Marsha Thomason as Naomi Dorrit, a young woman who arrived on the Kahana
- Marc Vann as Ray, the doctor for Kahana's crew
- Cynthia Watros as Libby, a survivor of Oceanic Flight 815. The actress was initially contracted to return for multiple episodes in the season to explore the character's mysterious backstory, but this was scrapped due to the 2007–08 Writers Guild of America strike.

== Production ==
The season was originally planned to contain sixteen episodes; eight were written before the start of the 2007–08 Writers Guild of America strike on November 5, 2007. Following the strike's resolution, it was announced that only five more episodes would be produced to complete the season; however, the season finale's script was so long that network executives approved the production of a 14th episode as part of a three-hour season finale split over two nights. Show runners Damon Lindelof and Carlton Cuse would note that for all the incoveniences, the interruption helped the season's quality for being able to use actors whose shows had been canceled during the strike, allowing the writers to respond to confusion from the audience, and in the scripts made after the pause discarding "languid, contemplative material" and feeling "recharged [with] a real energy to attack [the] last six episodes".

The show was primarily filmed in Hawaii with post-production in Los Angeles. Filming began on August 17, 2007, and once eighth episode "Meet Kevin Johnson" was completed November 27, production halted until the writer's strike was resolved in February 2008. By then, the season had already started airing, leading to a one month break between the eighth and ninth episodes. As soon as the strike ended, the writers spent February and March finishing three scripts, and the first two were filmed simultaneously starting on March 10. Given Alan Dale was unable to fly to Hawaii as he had been appearing in a production of the play Spamalot in London, the cast and crew went after him in England to film Charles Widmore's scenes. The scene in "The Shape of Things to Come" where Ben confronts Widmore in his apartment was filmed in a soundstage, while the other in the season finale where he talks to Sun by the Tower Bridge was shot on location. Season finale "There's No Place Like Home: Part 2" was filmed in approximately three and a half weeks, concluding three weeks before its scheduled airdate on May 29, while simultaneously four editors cut the episode in a task that under normal circumstances would take two months.

The fourth season was produced by ABC Studios, Bad Robot and Grass Skirt Productions. Damon Lindelof and Carlton Cuse served as the season's show runners. Lindelof and Cuse's fellow executive producers were co-creator J. J. Abrams, Bryan Burk and Jack Bender. The staff writers were Lindelof, Cuse, co-executive producers Edward Kitsis, Adam Horowitz, and Drew Goddard, supervising producer Elizabeth Sarnoff, co-producer Brian K. Vaughan and executive story editor Christina M. Kim. The regular directors were Bender and co-executive producer Stephen Williams.

=== Writer's strike cut material ===
Three episodes were cut from the second half of the season. Two of them were revealed to be a Ben-centric (Michael Emerson) flashback, later repurposed as a flash-forward, and a Charlotte-centric (Rebecca Mader) flashback. Mader admitted her character's storyline got "completely cut" in general because of the strike. She joked:

"It all went wrong for me after that so, looking back, I selfishly wish that hadn’t happened. I wanted to be Charles Widmore (Alan Dale)’s daughter. I think it would have been brilliant if I’d been a bit more intrinsically linked to all of that – and he was played by Jim from Neighbours".

Shortly before production of the fourth season began, Michael Emerson disclosed on a podcast that Annie (played by child actor Madeline Carroll) would return, and viewers would see her adult appearance. This is set up in the episode "The Other Woman", as Harper Stanhope (Andrea Roth), Juliet's therapist, remarks she looks "just like her", the "her" being an adult Annie. This is further teased in the episode's enhanced caption. Annie's identity for Harper's comparison was confirmed by Lindelof in a 2010 podcast (which implies Ben's mother (Carrie Preston) was a red herring). Harper's reappearance was also affected by the strike.

Showrunner Damon Lindelof also revealed at the 2007 San Diego Comic-Con they planned to show how Ben got caught in Rousseau's trap by accident and what he was doing on the other side of The Island (as it was left ambiguous whether it was intentional or not). They also expressed a desire to show his motivation for participating in The Purge. But neither storyline panned out. Speculation arose from fans, and Emerson who portrays Ben himself, that Annie may be a character the viewers are already familiar with.

There were also plans to resolve Libby's backstory in two further episodes after her appearance to Michael (Harold Perrineau) as an apparition.

Other cut material includes further development following the reunion between Danielle Rousseau (Mira Furlan) and Alex Rousseau (Tania Raymonde) after being reunited for the first time in 16 years since Alex's abduction. Though Furlan stated in her posthumously released memoir that they chose to kill her character off out of spite after she asked for better accommodations with her schedule after facing mistreatment on the set, hence why the reunion storyline was ignored.

== Reception ==
=== Critical reception ===
"With … a clear finish line in 2010, the creative team could now focus on telling their story without having to worry about how many episodes they had left to work with. Season four is the first to benefit and delivers a faster paced and leaner story that expands the Lost universe in some unexpected ways and delves into the mystery that was introduced at the end of last season."

— Reviews website IGN

On Rotten Tomatoes, the season has an approval rating of 88% with an average score of 8.6/10 based on 25 reviews. The website's critical consensus reads, "Lost regains its mojo in a fourth season that reaffirms the show's place as one of TV's most unique undertakings."

Time named Lost the seventh best television series of 2008 and praised the fourth season for "complicat[ing] [Lost's] time-and-space-travel story deliciously". Don Williams of BuddyTV dubbed "The Beginning of the End" "the most anticipated season premiere of the year" and Michael Ausiello later called the final hour of Lost's fourth season "the most anticipated 60 minutes of television all year." American critics were sent screener DVDs of "The Beginning of the End" and "Confirmed Dead" on January 28, 2008. Metacritic gave the season a score—a weighted average based on the impressions of a select twelve critical reviews—of 87, earning the second highest score in the 2007–2008 television season after the fifth and final season of HBO's The Wire. In a survey conducted by TVWeek of professional critics, Lost was voted the best show on television in the first half of 2008 "by a wide margin", apparently "crack[ing] the top five on nearly every critic's submission" and receiving "nothing but praise". The May 7, 2007 announcement of a 2010 series end date and the introduction of flashforwards were received favorably by critics, as were the season's new characters.

=== Awards and nominations ===
The fourth season was nominated for seven Primetime Emmy Awards, with one win, for Outstanding Sound Mixing for a Comedy or Drama Series (One-Hour). The series was nominated for Outstanding Drama Series, its second nomination in that category since the first season, while Michael Emerson received his second consecutive nomination for Outstanding Supporting Actor in a Drama Series. It also received nominations for Outstanding Cinematography for a One-Hour Series, Outstanding Music Composition for a Series (Original Dramatic Score), Outstanding Single-Camera Picture Editing for a Drama Series, and Outstanding Sound Editing for a Series.

The season earned Lost two Television Critics Association Award nominations for "Program of the Year" and "Outstanding Achievement in Drama". The season also was nominated for a 2008 Writers Guild of America Award in the category of Dramatic Series.

=== Ratings ===
Throughout the fourth season, Lost continued to slip in the ratings. The season premiered with 16 million American viewers, giving Lost its highest ratings in 17 episodes; however, the size of the audience steadily decreased throughout the season. The eighth episode, which served as the mid-season finale as a result of the writers' strike, brought in 11 million, setting a new series low. The next episode and midseason premiere climbed slightly to 12 million, but the episode after that set the current record for lowest-rated episode in the United States with 11 million people watching. The finale was seen by 12 million, reaching the most viewers since the midseason premiere and making it Lost's lowest-rated finale yet. Despite the decline in viewers, Lost consistently ranked within the top 20 programs of the week with one exception. The finale topped the chart, due to its broadcast being over a week after the official end of the television season. Entertainment president Stephen McPherson commented that while he would "love to see the show grow … the reality is that the numbers are pretty good."

== Home media ==
Lost: The Complete Fourth Season – The Expanded Experience
Set details			Special features		
14 episodes; 6-disc set/5 Blu-ray Discs; 1.78:1 aspect ratio; Subtitles: English SDH, Spanish & French; English (Dolby Digital 5.1 Surround) – DVD; English (PCM 5.1 Surround), French (Dolby Digital 5.1 Surround) & Spanish (Dolby Digital 2.0 Surround) – Blu-ray; Audio Commentaries; Runtime: 600 minutes			Audio commentaries on: "The Beginning of the End" by Evangeline Lilly and Jorge Garcia; "The Constant" by Mark Goldman, Damon Lindelof, and Carlton Cuse; "Ji Yeon" by Stephen Semel, Yunjin Kim, Daniel Dae Kim; "There's No Place Like Home (Part 2)" by Damon Lindelof and Carlton Cuse; "The Right to Bear Arms"; "The Freighter Folk"; "The Island Backlot: Lost in Hawaii"; "The Oceanic Six: A Conspiracy of Lies"; "Offshore Shoot"; "Soundtrack of Survival: Composing for Character, Conflict & Crash"; "Lost on Location"; "Course of the Future: The Definitive Flash-Forwards"; "Lost: Missing Pieces"; Deleted scenes; Bloopers; Easter Eggs		
Release dates
Brazil	Mexico	United States; Canada	Australia	Japan	United Kingdom
September 24, 2008	October 16, 2008	December 9, 2008	October 29, 2008	January 21, 2009	October 20, 2008
