= Martin Keamy =

Fictional character of the TV series Lost

- Lost character
- Keamy negotiates for Ben's surrender via walkie-talkie in the episode "The Shape of Things to Come"
- First appearance: "The Constant"
- Last appearance: "The Package"
- Portrayed by: Kevin Durand

In-universe information
- Full name: Martin Christopher Keamy
- Gender: Male
- Occupation: Mercenary; Marine Corps First Sergeant (Formerly)
- Former residence: Las Vegas, Nevada, United States

First Sergeant Martin Christopher Keamy is a fictional character played by Kevin Durand in the fourth season and sixth season of the American ABC television series Lost. Keamy is introduced in the fifth episode of the fourth season as a crew member aboard the freighter called the Kahana that is offshore the island where most of Lost takes place. In the second half of the season, Keamy served as the primary antagonist. He is the leader of a mercenary team hired by billionaire Charles Widmore (played by Alan Dale) that is sent to the island on a mission to capture Widmore's enemy Ben Linus (Michael Emerson) from his home, then torch the island.

Unlike Lost's ensemble of characters who, according to the writers, each have good and bad intentions, the writers have said that Keamy is evil and knows it. Durand was contacted for the role after one of Lost's show runners saw him in the 2007 film 3:10 to Yuma. Like other Lost actors, Durand was not informed of his character arc when he accepted the role. Throughout Durand's nine-episode stint as a guest star in the fourth season, little was revealed regarding Keamy's life prior to his arrival on the island and Durand cited this as a reason why the audience "loved to hate" his villainous character. Critics praised the writers for breaking Lost tradition and creating a seemingly heartless character, while Durand's performance and appearance were also reviewed positively. Keamy returned in the final season for a tenth and eleventh appearance.

== Arc ==
Originally from Las Vegas, Nevada, Martin Keamy was a First Sergeant of the United States Marine Corps, serving with distinction from 1996 to 2001. In the three years before the events of Lost in 2004, he worked with various mercenary organizations in Uganda. In fall 2004, Keamy is hired by Widmore to lead a mercenary team to the island via freighter then helicopter and extract Ben for a large sum of money. Once he captures Ben, Keamy has orders to kill everyone on the island (including the forty-plus survivors of the September 22, 2004 crash of Oceanic Airlines Flight 815: the protagonists of the series) by torching it.

Keamy boards the freighter Kahana in Suva, Fiji sometime between December 6 and December 10. On the night of December 25, helicopter pilot Frank Lapidus (Jeff Fahey) flies Keamy and his mercenary team, which consists of Omar (Anthony Azizi), Lacour, Kocol, Redfern and Mayhew, to the island. On December 27, the team ambushes several islanders in the jungle, taking Ben's daughter Alex Linus (Tania Raymonde) hostage and killing her boyfriend Karl (Blake Bashoff) and her mother Danielle Rousseau (Mira Furlan). The team infiltrates the Barracks compound where Ben resides, blowing up the house of 815 survivor Claire Littleton (Emilie de Ravin) and fatally shooting three 815 survivors (played by extras). Keamy attempts to negotiate for Ben's surrender in exchange for the safe release of Alex. Believing that he is bluffing, Ben does not comply, and Keamy shoots Alex dead. Ben retaliates by summoning the island's smoke monster, which brutally assaults the mercenaries and fatally wounds Mayhew.

Upon returning to the freighter, Keamy unsuccessfully attempts to kill Michael Dawson (Harold Perrineau), whom he has discovered is Ben's spy, then obtains the "secondary protocol" from a safe. The protocol contains instructions from Widmore for finding Ben if he finds out Keamy's intention to torch the island, which he apparently had. The protocol contains details about a 1980s research station called the "Orchid" that was previously run by a group of scientists working for the Dharma Initiative. Keamy is also informed by Captain Gault that Keamy and his mercenary squad may be suffering from some sort of mental sickness, a notion Keamy dismisses. Later in the day, Omar straps a dead man's switch to Keamy, rigged to detonate C4 on the freighter if Keamy's heart stops beating. That night, Frank refuses to fly the mercenaries to the island. In a display of power, Keamy slits the throat of the ship's doctor Ray (Marc Vann) and throws him overboard and later outdraws and shoots Captain Gault (Grant Bowler) during a tense standoff. Frank flies the remaining five mercenaries back to the island. On December 30, the team apprehends Ben at the Orchid and takes him to the chopper where they are ambushed and killed by Ben's people—referred to as the "Others" by the 815 survivors—and 815 survivors Kate Austen (Evangeline Lilly) and Sayid Jarrah (Naveen Andrews). After a chase to recapture Ben and a brawl with Sayid, Keamy is shot in the back by Richard Alpert (Nestor Carbonell), who leaves him for dead, unaware of Keamy's bulletproof vest. Later, Keamy descends into the Orchid's underground level via its elevator to stalk Ben, who hides in the shadows. Goading Ben with taunts about his daughter's death, Keamy is ambushed by Ben, who beats him into submission with an expandable baton before stabbing him repeatedly in the neck. Though Locke attempts to save his life for the sake of the freighter, Keamy dies and the dead man's trigger detonates the explosives on the freighter, killing nearly everyone aboard.

In the afterlife, Keamy is a business associate of Mr. Paik, Sun's (Yunjin Kim) father. Mr. Paik sends Jin (Daniel Dae Kim) to LA to give Keamy a watch and $25,000, intended to be Keamy's reward for killing Jin. However, the money is confiscated at customs in LAX, and Keamy is disappointed to discover it missing. He takes Jin to a restaurant and has him tied up in a freezer. Shortly after, Omar, one of Keamy's henchmen, captures Sayid and brings him to the same restaurant. Keamy explains to Sayid that his brother has been shot because he borrowed money and failed to pay it back. After Keamy threatens Sayid's family, Sayid retaliates and shoots Keamy in the chest, presumably killing him.

== Personality ==
"He's a bad guy, that's who the Keamy guy is. I should embrace the presence of a character like Keamy 'cause he makes Ben [a primary antagonist of the series] look like a pussycat. You know, Ben is just like our kooky uncle now, compared to Keamy."

— Actor Michael Emerson, who plays Ben

During the casting process, Keamy was described as a military type in his late-twenties who does not question orders. Chris Carabott of IGN wrote that "in a show that features characters fraught with uncertainty, Keamy is the polar opposite and his Marine mentality definitely sets him apart. His team has a physical advantage and with the help of Mr. Widmore, they have a tactical advantage as well. Keamy is like a bulldog being thrown into a cage full of kittens (except for [Iraqi military torturer] Sayid)". Jay Glatfelter of The Huffington Post, stated that "Keamy is Crazy! … out of all the bad guys on the Island—past, present, and future—Keamy has to be one of the most dangerous ones. Not because of how big he is, or the weaponry, but his willingness to kill at the drop of a hat. That doesn't bode well for our Losties [protagonists]." Co-show runner/executive producer/writer Carlton Cuse has stated that he and the other writers create "complex" characters because they "are interested in exploring how good and evil can be embodied in the same characters and [the writers are also intrigued] the struggles we all have[,] to overcome the dark parts of our souls"; however, he later clarified that there is an exception: "Keamy's bad, he knows he's bad, but he's ... a guy that does the job." Damon Lindelof stated that "the great thing about Keamy is that he is like a ... merciless survivor. [There]'s this great moment [in the season finale] where he just sort of hackie-sacks [a grenade thrown at him] over to where [his ally] Omar is standing. Omar is certainly an acceptable casualty as far as Keamy is concerned." According to a featurette in the Lost: The Complete Fourth Season – The Expanded Experience DVD set, Keamy likes "heavy weaponry" and "physical fitness" and dislikes "negotiations" and "doctors".

== Development ==
"Get your ass out here right now or I'm gonna kill your daughter."

— Keamy to Ben in "The Shape of Things to Come"

A remake of the 1957 film 3:10 to Yuma directed by James Mangold opened in theaters on September 7, 2007. Lost's co-showrunner/executive producer/head writer/co-creator Damon Lindelof enjoyed Kevin Durand's supporting performance as Tucker and checked to see if he was available for a role on Lost. The casting director had Durand read a page of dialogue for the new character Martin Keamy; Durand was offered the role in early October and he traveled to Honolulu in Hawaii—where Lost is filmed on location—by October 17, 2007. A former stand-up comic and rapper from Thunder Bay, Ontario, Canada, with the stage name "Kevy D", Durand had seen only around six episodes of Lost by the time he won the part. When he was shooting, he was confused by the story, later stating "I didn't want to know anything or be attached to anybody. I'm glad I didn't. But now that I'm on it, I'll watch all of it." Durand revealed his appreciation for the cast, crew and scripts and the fact that he had the chance to act as someone with a similar physical appearance to himself, as he had previously done roles that had not prompted recognition from viewers on the street.

Durand was never informed of his character arc and only learned more of Keamy's importance to the plot as he received new scripts; thus, he was thrilled when the role was expanded for his third appearance, in "The Shape of Things to Come", when he kills Alex and Durand compared his excitement to that of "a kid in a candy store." He also stated that "you really don't know what's going to happen in the next episode and you get the scripts pretty late, so it is pretty secretive and it's kind of exciting that way [because] you're really forced to get in the moment and say the words and play the guy". Durand was initially met with negative reaction from fans on the street for this action and he defended his murderous character by arguing that it was actually more Ben's fault for failing to negotiate with Keamy; later, fans warmed up to Keamy. Despite the antagonist's increasing popularity and fanbase, it became apparent to Durand that fans were hoping for Keamy's death in what promised to be a showdown in the season finale. Throughout his nine-episode run, Keamy never receives an episode in which his backstory is developed through flashbacks and Durand holds this partially responsible for the negative reaction to his character, saying that the audience "[has not] really seen anything outside of Keamy's mission, so I think they definitely want him put down." Following the season's conclusion, Durand stated that he would not be surprised if his character returned in the fifth season and concluding that "Lost was really fun. If I can have that experience in any genre, I'd take it."

Durand returned for the sixth-season episodes "Sundown" and "The Package", following a twenty-two episode absence since his character's death in the fourth-season finale. Keamy appears in the "flash sideways" parallel timeline in September 2004 working for Sun Kwon's father Mr. Paik to assassinate her new husband Jin Kwon (Daniel Dae Kim) upon the couple's arrival in Los Angeles. Keamy and his sidekick Omar are also extorting money from Sayid's brother Omer, prompting Sayid to shoot them both, aiding Jin's rescue process.

== Reception ==
Professional television critics deemed Martin Keamy a welcome addition to the cast. Jeff Jensen of Entertainment Weekly commented that Kevin Durand "is emerging as a real find this season; he plays that mercenary part with a scene-stealing mix of menace and damaged vulnerability." After Jensen posted what he thought were the fifteen best moments of the season, the New York Post's Jarett Wieselman "ha[d] to complain about one glaring omission from EW's list: Martin Keamy. I have loved this character all season long—and not just solely for [his] physical attributes ... although those certainly don't hurt." Alan Sepinwall of The Star-Ledger reflected, "He was only on the show for a season and not featured all that much in that season, but Kevin Durand always made an impression as Keamy. Lots of actors might have his sheer physical size, but there's a sense of danger (insanity?) that you can't build at the gym, you know?" IGN's Chris Carabott wrote that "Keamy is one of the more striking new additions to Lost [in the fourth] season ... and is a welcome addition to the Lost universe." Maureen Ryan of The Chicago Tribune stated that Keamy has "so much charisma" and she would "rather find out more about [him] than most of the old-school Lost characters". TV Guide's Bruce Fretts agreed with a reader's reaction to Durand's "chilling portrayal" of Keamy and posted it in his weekly column. The reader, nicknamed "huntress", wrote "love him or hate him, nobody is neutral when it comes to Keamy, which is the hallmark of a well-played villain. Even the camera seems to linger on Durand, who conveys malice with just a look or tilt of his head. This role should give Durand's career a well-deserved boost". Following his demise, Whitney Matheson of USA Today noted that "it seems Keamy, Lost's camouflaged baddie, is turning into a bit of a cult figure." A "hilarious" blog containing Keamy digitally edited into various photographs, posters and art titled "Keamy's Paradise" was set up in early June 2008. TV Squad's Bob Sassone thought that the blog was "a great idea" and "funny" and he called Keamy "the Boba Fett of Lost". In 2009, Kevin Durand was nominated for a Saturn Award for Best Guest Starring Role in a Television Series.

Reaction to the antagonist's death was mixed. Kristin Dos Santos of E! criticized the writing for Keamy when he futilely asks Sayid where his fellow 815 survivors are so that he can kill them, but enjoyed his attractive physique, writing that "that guy is deep-fried evil, and he must die horribly for what he did to Alex, but in the meantime, well, he's certainly a well-muscled young man". The Huffington Post's Jay Glatfelter also called for Keamy's death, stating that "nothing would be better to me than him getting run over by Hurley's Dharma Bus", alluding to a scene in the third-season finale. Dan Compora of SyFy Portal commented that "Keamy took a bit too long to die. Yes, he was wearing a bulletproof vest so it wasn't totally unexpected, but it was a bit predictable." In a review of the season finale, Erin Martell of AOL's TV Squad declared her disappointment in the conclusion of Keamy's arc, stating that "it's always a shame when the hot guys die, [especially when] Kevin Durand did an amazing job with the character … he'll be missed." In a later article titled "Lost Season Four Highlights", Martell noted Durand's "strong performance" that was "particularly fun to watch" and wrote that "we [the audience] all know that Widmore's the big bad, but Keamy became the face of evil on the island in his stead."
