= The Economist (Lost) =

- Lost episode
- Episode no.: Season 4 Episode 3
- Directed by: Jack Bender
- Written by: Edward Kitsis; Adam Horowitz
- Production code: 403
- Original air date: February 14, 2008
- Running time: 42 minutes

Guest appearances
- Zoë Bell as Regina; Jeff Fahey as Frank Lapidus; Mira Furlan as Danielle Rousseau; Armando Pucci as Peter Avellino; Thekla Reuten as Elsa; Marsha Thomason as Naomi Dorrit

Episode chronology
← Previous "Confirmed Dead"	Next → "Eggtown"
- Lost season 4

"The Economist" is the third episode of the fourth season and 75th episode overall of the ABC's television series Lost. It was aired on February 14, 2008, on ABC in the United States and on CTV in Canada. The episode was written by co-executive producers Edward Kitsis and Adam Horowitz and directed by executive producer Jack Bender. In the episode's narrative, Sayid Jarrah (Naveen Andrews) and Kate Austen (Evangeline Lilly) negotiate for John Locke's (Terry O'Quinn) hostage Charlotte Lewis (Rebecca Mader), while physicist and Kahana crew member Daniel Faraday (Jeremy Davies) discovers that time on the island runs at an offset from the rest of the world. Another storyline follows Sayid working as an assassin after being rescued from the island.

"The Economist" was watched by 14 million American viewers and received positive reactions from critics.

== Plot ==
Jack Shephard (Matthew Fox) and Miles Straume (Ken Leung) argue about what to do about leader of the Others, Ben Linus (Michael Emerson), and Miles's colleague Charlotte, both sought after by Miles and his colleagues and taken prisoner by Locke. Sayid pays his respects to Naomi Dorrit, and takes her bracelet. He then offers to retrieve Charlotte without bloodshed, in return gaining a helicopter flight to the freighter anchored offshore. He takes along Miles and Kate. Sayid asks Jack not to come with them as Jack might be unpredictable around Locke.

While Sayid is gone, Daniel asks Regina (Zoë Bell), a colleague on the freighter to shoot a projectile onto the island. Regina does so, but the projectile does not arrive for thirty minutes. When it lands, Daniel extracts a clock from the payload and finds that the two times, that running on the island and that running outside, are not synchronized.

The survivors led by Locke arrive at the location of Jacob's cabin, but find the area deserted. Locke changes his course to the barracks, and uses Hugo "Hurley" Reyes (Jorge Garcia) to ambush Sayid, Kate and Miles. Kate is watched by James "Sawyer" Ford (Josh Holloway), and they discuss their reasons for wanting or not wanting to go home. Kate, realizing that she would be arrested for her crimes upon rescue, defects to Locke's group. Sayid negotiates with Locke to exchange Charlotte with Miles, in order to get access to the boat. Locke tells him that wouldn't be necessary as Ben has a spy on that freighter, to which Sayid responds that he would rather sell his soul than trust Ben.

At the helicopter, Desmond Hume (Henry Ian Cusick) confronts pilot Frank Lapidus (Jeff Fahey) about the picture Naomi had of him and his ex-fiancée Penelope Widmore (Sonya Walger). Frank denies any knowledge of her, but Desmond nevertheless demands a place on a helicopter. At the same time, Sayid returns, with only Charlotte. While Frank accuses Sayid of being dishonest, he considered Miles a "pain in the ass", and agrees to fly him offshore.

The episode's flashforwards are centered on Sayid in Berlin, who had since become one of the Oceanic Six. He is hired as an assassin, and courts a German woman, Elsa (Thekla Reuten), in order to get closer to her employer (the eponymous "economist"). After several dates, Sayid turns on Elsa, who reveals herself to be a counter-spy by unexpectedly shooting Sayid in the shoulder. Sayid is able to shoot and kill Elsa. As the episode ends, Sayid is treated for his wound by Ben, who gives him another assignment. Sayid is now wary since they now know that he's after them, to which Ben replies, "Good".

== Production ==
The story of Sayid's future was influenced by spy fiction—in particular, the writing eventually "gravitated" towards a story much like the Jason Bourne franchise. The story was justified by Sayid's status as part of the "Oceanic Six", as his celebrity status would provide the perfect cover for his clandestine activities. The episode was written in autumn 2007. At the end of the first scene in Berlin, the flag shown on the building across the street from where Sayid stands is actually that of the former East German GDR.

An important scene in the episode regarded Faraday's experiment and the resulting time differential. The scene set up a prominent theme of "time-travel" for later episodes. In the episode's respective podcast, Lost's show runners Carlton Cuse and Damon Lindelof further discussed the time differential as part of an already existing theme regarding transport between the island and the rest of the world. In particular, the theme was alluded to the "Orchid video", a Dharma Initiative video that premiered at the 2007 Comic-Con.

However, some scenes in the episode gained unintentional significance. The Boston Red Sox won the World Series for the second time in three years after the episode was written, which prompted the question "Is it possible Lapidus is actually from 2008?" due to his annoyed reply. Likewise, the only reason that Elsa and Naomi had similar bracelets was that it would serve as an "emotional touchstone" for Sayid. After the episode, the producers received several emails about both issues.

Andrews enjoyed his role in "The Economist". He appreciated that, unlike the third season, he was able to "push the story forward", which he thought was "infinitely more interesting and rewarding." The premise "threw [him] for a loop", and he was pleased with how complex the episode was.

== Reception ==
"The Economist" was seen by 13.76 million American viewers, making Lost the fourth most watched program of the week. The episode received a Nielsen rating of 5.8/15 in the key adults 18–49 demographic. In Great Britain, Lost brought in 1.2 million viewers.

The first four episodes of the fourth season were watched beforehand by TV Guide, who called them "worth the wait" and "emotionally satisfying". TV Guide also stated that they "provide gaspworthy plot twists that should whip fans into a theory-spinning tizzy." Sarah Vasques of eFluxMedia thought the scene where Daniel discovers the time discrepancy the most mind-blowing scene of the episode. Entertainment Weekly commented that "for the second straight year, Cupid was kicked in the nuts", as the episode "Flashes Before Your Eyes" also aired on St. Valentine's Day. Also discussed in the review was possible Biblical allegory to the Book of Daniel. However, Mark Madley of The National Post thought that this episode, along with the previous two, gave away too much plot detail, and compared the off-island storyline to "that awful Stallone/Banderas movie Assassins". Don Williams of BuddyTV thought that the scene where Sayid disposes of his cellphone after calling Ben "like an episode of Alias", and finished his recap by saying "consider my mind blown again". MaryAnn Johanson of Film.com called the episode "mind-blowing", and theorized that Sayid had been working for Ben before the crash, and that the crash of Oceanic 815 was deliberate. Chris Carabott of IGN stated that, in the episode "Sayid Jarrah is a badass who could give Jack Bauer, James Bond, and Jason Bourne all a run for their money", and praised Lost's nature for being able to have "a lighthearted episode featuring Hurley [one week] and the next can be an action spy thriller starring Sayid." He praised the episode for being a perfect example of serialized television, and thought that Elsa's double cross to be "very reminiscent of Vesper Lynd and her true employer in Casino Royale". Overall, he rated the episode 8.6 out of 10.
