= Alex Rousseau =

Fictional character of the TV series Lost

- Lost character
- First appearance: "Maternity Leave" (2006)
- Last appearance: "What They Died For" (2010)
- Portrayed by: Tania Raymonde

In-universe information
- Full name: Alexandra Rousseau
- Gender: Female
- Relatives: Danielle Rousseau (mother); Robert (biological father); Benjamin Linus (adoptive father)
- Birthplace: The Island

Alexandra Rousseau is a fictional character on the ABC television series Lost played by Tania Raymonde. She was born 16 years prior to the crash of Oceanic Flight 815, but was taken from her mother, Danielle Rousseau, by Ben Linus. She was raised among them, believing her mother to be dead. She has helped the survivors of Oceanic Flight 815 on many occasions, and is reunited with her mother at the end of the third season. Not long after however, she is shot and killed by Keamy after her adoptive father, Ben, would not listen to his demands. Her death scene was received positively by critics, earning it a spot on multiple "top moments of the season" lists.

== Arc ==
=== Before the crash ===
A heavily pregnant Danielle Rousseau (Mira Furlan) and her husband Robert (Guillaume Dabinpons) along with the rest of their crew, shipwrecked on the island, 16 years before the crash of Oceanic Flight 815, during a French scientific expedition. According to Rousseau, her team becomes "sick", so she kills them all, and later gives birth to Alexandra. Rousseau claims she saw a column of black smoke on the island a week later. That night, Benjamin Linus (Michael Emerson) and a young Ethan Rom (William Mapother) are ordered by Charles Widmore (Alan Dale) to kill Danielle and, subsequently, her baby, Alex. Instead, unwilling to kill an innocent child, Ben neglected Widmore's orders and kidnapped Alex to raise her as his daughter and let Danielle live.

=== After the crash ===
Sixteen years later, Alex meets the pregnant woman Claire Littleton (Emilie de Ravin), whom the Other, Ethan Rom, had kidnapped to take her baby. Alex tells her that the Others will kill Claire once they get her baby. She leads Claire out of the Others' hatch and tries to make her get back to safety.

When Kate, Sawyer, and Jack are captured by the Others, Alex attempts to break Kate and Sawyer out of where they are being held captive, but stops and gives up when another Other, Danny Pickett (Michael Bowen) pulls a gun on her. In a later rescue attempt, Alex is successful in helping Kate and Sawyer escape. She agrees to let them back to the main island so long as they help rescue her boyfriend, Karl (Blake Bashoff). After finding where he is, they break him out of a mysterious room where he has been undergoing brainwashing. Alex, Kate, Sawyer, and Karl are about to leave when Juliet (Elizabeth Mitchell) insists Alex stays. Later Alex helps Jack escape from his cell to stop Juliet's execution. Thanks to their interference, Juliet is not executed, only "marked."

Alex, along with the rest of the Others and Jack, returns to her home in Barracks. She is surprised when Sayid (Naveen Andrews), part of the rescue party that has arrived to get Jack, says that he knows her thought-to-be deceased mother. She later unknowingly walks past Danielle Rousseau, her mother, while taking Locke (Terry O'Quinn) to the Other's submarine at Ben's request.

The Others leave the Barracks and begin travelling to the Temple with Locke, as he wishes to join them. After he is initiated, Alex approaches Locke, and gives him a pistol, claiming he'll need it if he was planning to meet the leader of the Others, Jacob (Mark Pellegrino). However, when Ben returns alone the next day, he bitterly returns the gun to her, and reveals his plan for a group of Others to go to the survivor's camp that night and kidnap the pregnant women. Sensing trouble, Alex flees into the jungle in search of Karl, who has been living in hiding since his escape. She gives him her gun and tells him he must warn the survivors. The two kiss before Karl heads off. Ben goes to confront the survivors, bringing Alex with him. On the way there, Ben tells her that he is taking her to her new family, explaining the reason he locked Karl up was he didn't want him getting Alex pregnant. Once they meet the survivors, Ben reunites Alex with her mother.

She joins Locke's group who head to the Barracks, fearing people on an incoming freighter. Ben sends Alex, Karl and Danielle to the Temple for extra safety, but on the way they are ambushed by mercenaries from the freighter who are looking for Ben, resulting in Karl and Danielle being shot. Alex surrenders shouting that she was Ben's daughter. She is used as a hostage to try to have Ben surrender. Alex sets off a distress signal at the electric fence surrounding the Barracks to warn Ben and the others that the mercenaries were coming. They threaten to kill her if Ben will not surrender himself. Ben refuses, and the lead mercenary, Keamy, executes Alex with one gunshot to the head. Later, Ben goes to Alex's body to say goodbye.

Alex appeared posthumously as a manifestation of the Smoke Monster to judge Ben for Alex's death. Ben is spared but as his punishment, the Monster (in the form of Alex) ordered him to follow and listen to John Locke's every word and never again to try to harm him in any way or he will bear the consequences. Crushed by once again seeing Alex, Ben complies. Richard Alpert later explains that he buried Alex's body and shows Ben where.

=== Flash-Sideways ===
Alex is a bright high school student in Los Angeles hoping to major in history. Her teacher, Ben Linus, holds her in high regard, telling her the future is nothing to worry about. Later, while he is tutoring her, she reveals to Ben about Principal Reynolds' sexual affair with one of the school nurses on campus, which leads to Ben attempting to blackmail Reynolds for his position as principal. However, Reynolds retaliates by saying if he is blackmailed, he will not write Alex a letter of recommendation for Yale University. Ben backs down, preferring to savor Alex's educational future. Unlike his island counterpart, Ben has chosen Alex over himself. He is eventually invited over for dinner at the Rousseau's home with Alex and her mother, Danielle. Danielle thanks Ben for everything he has done for Alex and says he is the closest thing Alex has to a father, by which Ben is visibly moved.

== Characteristics ==
Alex is a renegade Other who often turns her back on her group in order to help the crash survivors. Sawyer nicknames her "Sheena", a reference to Sheena, Queen of the Jungle, a girl raised in the jungle who is an expert in fighting with makeshift weapons.

== Development ==
Tania Raymonde was told her character would be called "Jessica" when first cast in the role. Furthermore, her character was promoted as a survivor who would be introduced in "Maternity Leave". Cast members often read fake lines with a different names in their audition to limit potential spoilers from leaking. In her first appearance, Raymonde was credited as "young girl", preventing viewers knowing in advance that Alex would be introduced.

Mira Furlan met Raymonde for the first time just minutes before shooting their reunion scene in the season three finale. The actors believed the scene to be a "huge moment" for their characters, which Furlan described as a "basic human moment". Furlan was glad to have "such a beautiful partner", and noted their physical resemblance.

== Reception ==
Jeff Jensen from Entertainment Weekly described Alex's death scene as "hardcore", commenting that it will be "sitting very high on this ranking of all-time pivotal Lost moments" by the end of the series. Before the season finale aired, Jensen ranked this as the second best moment of the season IGN's Chris Carabott also considered it "one of the more pivotal scenes in the entire series" due to it being "phenomenally shot, edited and acted" Oscar Dahl described it as "perfectly paced … and provided a huge shock … and some of the best acting you'll ever see" ranking it the fifth best moment of the season.

== Appearances in Lost ==
Key: = Recurring
Key: = Guest
Key: = No Appearances

Actor	Character	Appearances						
Actor	Character	S1	S2	S3	S4	S5	S6	Total
Tania Raymonde	Alex Rousseau		3	9	6	1	2	21
