= Kyle Pennington =

American television writer (born 1979)

Kyle David Pennington (born March 1979) is an American television writer. He is credited with writing episodes of the American television series, Lost. He was nominated for a Writers Guild of America Award for Best Dramatic Series at the February 2009 ceremony for his work on the fourth season of Lost. The writing staff was nominated for the award again at the February 2010 ceremony for their work on the fifth season.

== Lost episodes ==
- "Cabin Fever" (Season 4, Episode 11) with Elizabeth Sarnoff
- "LaFleur" (Season 5, Episode 8) with Elizabeth Sarnoff

== Biography ==
Kyle grew up in the East Bay region of Northern California near San Francisco in the city of Walnut Creek, CA. He attended Monte Vista High School (Danville, California) from 1993 to 1996 and attended San Pasqual High School (Escondido, California) from 1996 to 1997 before studying film at the University of California, San Diego from 1997 to 2001.

== Other works ==
- Writer, Director, Producer and Cinematographer for a 48 Hour Film Festival short, entitled Contract (2005)
