= Danielle Rousseau =

Lost character

- Lost character
- Mira Furlan as Danielle Rousseau in 2007.
- First appearance: "Solitary"
- Last appearance: "Meet Kevin Johnson" (alive) "What They Died For" (afterlife)
- Created by: J. J. Abrams; Damon Lindelof
- Portrayed by: Mira Furlan; Melissa Farman (younger)

In-universe information
- Full name: Danielle Rousseau
- Species: Human
- Gender: Female
- Occupation: Scientist
- Children: Alex Rousseau
- Nationality: French
- Former residence: France

Danielle Rousseau is a fictional character on the ABC drama television series Lost, which chronicles the lives of over forty people after their plane crashes on a remote island somewhere in the South Pacific. Croatian actress Mira Furlan plays the scientist who shipwrecks on the island sixteen years prior to the crash of Oceanic Flight 815. After Rousseau is killed in the fourth season, the American actress Melissa Farman portrayed a younger version of the character in the fifth season. Furlan later reappears for one episode in the sixth season in a flashback. Rousseau is a recurring on-island character who has appeared in nineteen episodes in seasons one through four, as well as one episode where her voice alone is heard, and her final episode in the sixth season.

The character, who is commonly known as "The French Woman" among the survivors on the island, is introduced early in the first season. Sixteen years prior to the plane crash, Rousseau was a member of a French research vessel, whose ship ran aground on the island. Two months after being stranded, Rousseau gave birth to her daughter Alex (Tania Raymonde); however, Alex was taken by the island's original inhabitants, a group which Rousseau called the "Others". Rousseau's primary objective is to reunite with her daughter; 16 years 253 days 21 hours 42 min 59 seconds later, which is achieved in the season three finale "Through the Looking Glass". The reunion is short-lived; Rousseau is shot and killed by a band of mercenaries in the middle of the fourth season.

Damon Lindelof later revealed that the short-lived reunion was unexplored due to the 2007–2008 Writers Guild of America strike, which also scrapped an episode dedicated to the character. Furlan also later denied rumors she requested to leave the series. The character's death scene in "Meet Kevin Johnson" received generally negative reviews; retrospective reviews opined that the scene was "tacked on".

Furlan was recast in the fifth season, partly after a salary dispute. While it was remarked that Rousseau's return in flashback form "disingenuous", the character does return in Ben's flashback "Dead Is Dead", while two other appearances are accounted for through the storytelling device of time travel.

Critical reaction to the character has been generally positive; however, many have expressed disappointment in the execution of Rousseau's death scene.

== Arc ==
=== Prior to the crash ===
Sixteen years before Oceanic 815 crashes on the island, Rousseau was a heavily pregnant member of a six-person crew aboard a French research vessel three days out of Tahiti. The crew picked up a radio signal emanating from the South Pacific, which was a repeating set of six numbers: 4, 8, 15, 16, 23 and 42. While attempting to find the source of the signal, the ship ran aground on rocks surrounding the island. Before reaching the shore, Rousseau and her team found Oceanic 815 survivor Jin-Soo Kwon (Daniel Dae Kim) in the water, who had been time-travelling as a result of the time shifts which had been moving him and the flight survivors through the island's history.

Rousseau later tells the survivors of Oceanic 815 that two months after their arrival, that the island natives, which she called the Others, carried a disease that the rest of her crew had contracted. She believed that this disease could not be allowed to reach the rest of the world, so she killed her colleagues, including her husband Robert. When Jin time-travels to the past, he witnesses a different version of Rousseau's past. It is shown that the Smoke Monster, not the Others, was responsible for the "sickness" that forced her to kill her crew. Rousseau confronts the father of her child, Robert, at gunpoint and accuses him of "being changed" inside the temple. Robert denies this, explaining that the Monster is a security system for the temple, and convinces Rousseau to lower her weapon. He attempts to shoot her when she does, but is shot by Rousseau. Rousseau also attempts to kill Jin, having witnessed him vanish moments after her team entered the Smoke Monster's lair, believing he has the disease.

Rousseau hiked to the radio tower and changed the message from the numbers to a repeating distress call. Three days later, Rousseau gave birth to a daughter, Alexandra. One week after Alex's birth, Benjamin Linus (Michael Emerson) came and took Alex from Rousseau. Ben told Rousseau that the child would be safe with them, and that she was lucky for being left alive. Before leaving, Ben tells her that if she hears whispers, she should run the other way. After this, Rousseau began setting traps in the jungle with the hope of catching one of the people responsible for Alex's kidnapping.

=== After the crash ===
Rousseau makes her first appearance in the season one episode "Solitary", where she captures Sayid (Naveen Andrews), one of the plane crash survivors. Rousseau tortures him until he eventually convinces her that he is not one of the Others. She allows Sayid to return to his camp, and cautions him to keep a close eye on the other survivors. Over two weeks later, she comes across a delirious Claire (Emilie de Ravin), who had been left in the jungle after being kidnapped by the Others. Noticing that Claire's shouting is alerting the Others to her presence, Rousseau knocks her unconscious and carries her back to the other survivors. Rousseau makes her next appearance in "Numbers", where she shoots at Charlie (Dominic Monaghan) and Hurley (Jorge Garcia), suspecting them of being Others. In the season one finale, set 43 days after the plane crash, Rousseau arrives on the beach and warns everyone that the Others are coming. After Claire gives birth to her son Aaron, Rousseau steals him and intends to swap him for her own child. When the Others do not come, Rousseau reluctantly returns him to Sayid. In season two, set two weeks later, Rousseau informs Sayid that she has caught one of the Others, who later turns out to be Ben. Later, Rousseau joins Claire and Kate Austen (Evangeline Lilly) who are searching for medicine for Claire's baby, in one of the Others' work stations. Disappointed that she has not found any trace of Alex, she begins to leave them when Claire tells her that she believes Alex helped her escape when the Others captured her.

Midway through season three, Kate persuades Rousseau to help some of the survivors find the Others' home, by informing her that Alex helped her escape from the Others. When they arrive, Rousseau abandons the group and watches from the bushes as Alex walks past. A few days later, Rousseau leads the survivors to the radio tower in order for them to contact a nearby freighter. En route, they encounter Ben and Alex; Ben explains to Alex who Rousseau is and the mother and daughter are reunited. Season four begins with the survivors dividing into two groups, with those who believe the people from the freighter to be dangerous, including Rousseau and Alex, joining Locke (Terry O'Quinn). After learning of the freighter crew's intentions to kill everyone on the island, Ben directs Rousseau, along with Alex and her boyfriend Karl (Blake Bashoff), to head to the Temple where the rest of the Others are located. On their way, Rousseau and Karl are shot by unseen attackers, and both are killed. The buried bodies of both are discovered by Miles (Ken Leung), Sawyer (Josh Holloway), and Claire after they leave Locke and travel back to the beach.

=== Flash-sideways ===
In the flash-sideways scenes which depict the survivors' afterlife, Rousseau is still the mother of Alex and lives with her. Alex introduces her mother to Dr. Linus because he's been hurt after being battered by Desmond. Danielle and Alex bring him home for dinner. While Alex is doing her homework, Danielle and Dr. Linus talk about her. She tells him that since the death of her father when she was two, he's the closest thing to a father figure that she has. Dr. Linus is visibly touched.

== Development ==
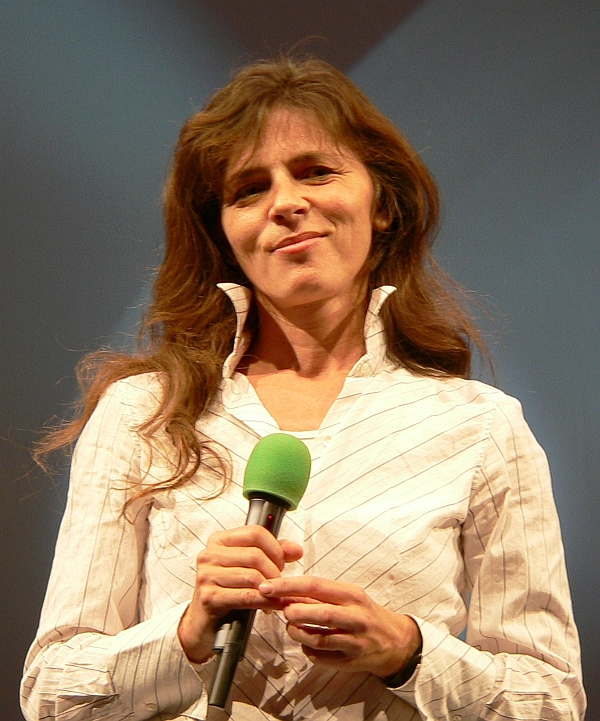
Furlan in Budapest, 2006

Rousseau is named after French-Swiss philosopher Jean-Jacques Rousseau. Although Rousseau is French, actress Mira Furlan is Croatian, which led to speculation that Rousseau is not really from France. In one of the official Lost podcasts, producer Carlton Cuse joked, "any French woman who speaks with a Croatian accent and has been living in the woods for sixteen years eating bugs ... has got some issues, and those issues need to be overcome before she can actually go and embrace Alex". Furlan understood Rousseau's decision to not meet her daughter, believing that no one can ever be prepared for that moment. Furlan met Raymonde for the first time just minutes before shooting their reunion scene in the season three finale. The actors believed the scene to be a "huge moment" for their characters, which Furlan described as a "basic human moment." Furlan was glad to have "such a beautiful partner," and noted their physical resemblance.

Furlan was said to have asked for her character to be written out of the series because she did not want to travel to Hawaii to film her scenes, although she later called this an untrue rumor. The producers decided for Rousseau to be shot, with the possibility of her returning in season five. Co-show runners and executive producers Damon Lindelof and Cuse originally intended for Rousseau to get her own flashback episode in season four, however as a result of the Writer's Strike, this did not come to pass.

In her memoir, Furlan disclosed the producers retaliated against her during re-negotiation for a new deal to guest star on the show (as she was not under contract as a series regular). She remarked how asking for better accommodations—after dealing with a hostile work environment for years—suddenly led "the discourse to change"; they abruptly announced a plan to kill her character off, leaving "the mother and the daughter storyline unfinished". On the decision, she said:

I was puzzled: are they ready to rewrite the whole storyline just because I dared to ask for something, that something not even being more money? Yes.

Despite being aware of the deception, she was falsely informed by executive producer Carlton Cuse that "getting shot" would not be her character's death scene. Instead, he claimed it was to better set up her return later on. Furlan conceded to returning after personal attacks and repeated begging. But after this, she was informed by someone in the street that her character was legitimately killed off. This, as well as being recast without being informed in advance, upset her.

When asked whether Rousseau would have a flashback in season five, Lindelof said that Rousseau's story would "definitively" be revealed, but that "to use the word flashback would be disingenuous". Cuse revealed that they were trying to steer away from the word flashback and were "embracing a whole new word". He explained that "there will still [...] be flashbacks and flash-forwards on the show, but we're going to do something different this year. We're going to mix it up." Instead of using flashbacks and flashforwards like in previous seasons, stories of the fifth season will play out both on and off the island stories in different points in time. The writers were supposedly scheduling an appearance by Furlan for the fifth season, but Furlan did not end up making an appearance.

Between season four and five, the producers initially approached her agent with "more money than [she'd] ever made on the show". But she attempted to leverage her value by doubling the offer. She later expressed regret and wrote a letter to try and mend the situation by explaining her reasons for doing so, after years of mistreatment. Her lone season six appearance was initially supposed to span 3 episodes, but she remarked how a crew member told her it was "surplus" and then her role for the last two episodes was cut. Her return in season six was purely in the form of Rousseau's "sideways" counterpart (who never crashed on the Island, or lost Alex).

== Reception ==
In a review of the first-season episode "Solitary", Chris Carabott of IGN commented that Rousseau appeared to be more emotionally fragile than in later seasons, and was like a "loose cannon". Carabott found that as the series progressed and the mystery around the character was lessened, Rousseau was unable to deliver the same impact she made in her first appearance. In his review of "Numbers", in which Rousseau makes her second appearance, Carabott described Hurley and Rousseau's encounter as "the episode's best moment", as "Hurley finds comfort with someone who we would least expect." Lost co-creator J. J. Abrams commended Furlan for giving the character "heart and soul", and managed to make her "identifiable and complex".

Rousseau's death in "Meet Kevin Johnson" was heavily discussed among critics. Alan Sepinwall of The Star-Ledger felt that the relationship between Rousseau and Alex after their reunion remained unexplored, which made Rousseau's death a wasted opportunity for a powerful death scene. BuddyTV's Don Williams believed that Rousseau would survive, mainly because he had been waiting to see her flashback for four seasons, and thought her death would ensure it would not happen. Dan Compora from SyFy Portal was disappointed in her death scene, noting, "I wasn't shocked to see Danielle get killed, but the scene felt like it was tossed in just in case this had to serve as the season finale." Compora felt that Rousseau deserved more screen time in the episode leading up to her death. The San Francisco Chronicle's Tim Goodman described it as "a rude and lazy way to get rid of Rousseau". John Kubicek, also of BuddyTV, found her death scene unsatisfactory, commenting, "Then we have that entirely tacked on scene at the end which felt so artificial, like I accidentally flipped over to a different show. While I agree Danielle Rousseau being shot with an arrow is shocking, is this really what the show has come to? Arbitrarily putting a recurring character's life in peril to pose as a cliffhanger?"

== Appearances in Lost ==
Key: = Recurring
Key: = Guest

Actor	Character	Appearances						
Actor	Character	S1	S2	S3	S4	S5	S6	Total
Mira Furlan; Melissa Farman (younger)	Danielle Rousseau	6	3	8	5	3	1	26
