= Airlock Alpha =

American website for sci-fi news (1998–2018)

- Former name: SyFy Portal
- Website type: Science-fiction/fantasy entertainment news
- Dissolved: November 2018
- Headquarters: Tampa, Florida, {{{location_country}}}
- Owner: Nexus Media Group Inc.
- Creators: Michael Hinman; Greg Boubel
- Website: airlockalpha.com (defunct)
- Commercial: Yes
- Launched: 1998

Airlock Alpha, formerly SyFy Portal, was an entertainment news website focusing on science-fiction, fantasy and comic book television series and films.

== History ==
In 1998, Michael Hinman created the website SyFy World and Greg Boubel created the website Star Trek Portal. In 2001, Boubel joined with Hinman, merging their two websites into SyFy Portal, under joint ownership. When Boubel left in 2007, Hinman created Quantum Global Media, incorporated in Florida, to hold his SyFy Portal website.

In February 2009, Hinman rebranded his website Airlock Alpha, having sold the SyFy Portal brand name to NBCUniversal, owner of the Sci Fi Channel; the cable television channel changed its own name to Syfy a month later. In 2011, reincorporated his holding company as Nexus Media Group.

The last new item posted to the website was dated 14 November 2018, and the domain had expired by no later than 20 February 2022.

== Portal Awards ==
Starting in 1999, with the SyFy Portal Genre Awards, later shortened to the Portal Awards, Airlock Alpha handed out fan-vote awards for genre television and movies until at least 2010, missing 2002 due to the September 11 attacks.

By 2010, awards had been presented in the categories of:

- Best Series – Television
- Best Actor – Television
- Best Actress – Television
- Best Supporting Actor – Television
- Best Supporting Actress – Television
- Best Episode – Television
- Best Guest Star – Television
- Best Movie
- Best Actor – Movie
- Best Actress – Movie
- Best Young Actor
- Best Web Site (introduced 2006)
- Best Web Production (introduced 2007)
- Gene Roddenberry Lifetime Achievement Award
