= Kristin dos Santos =

American journalist

Kristin Dos Santos
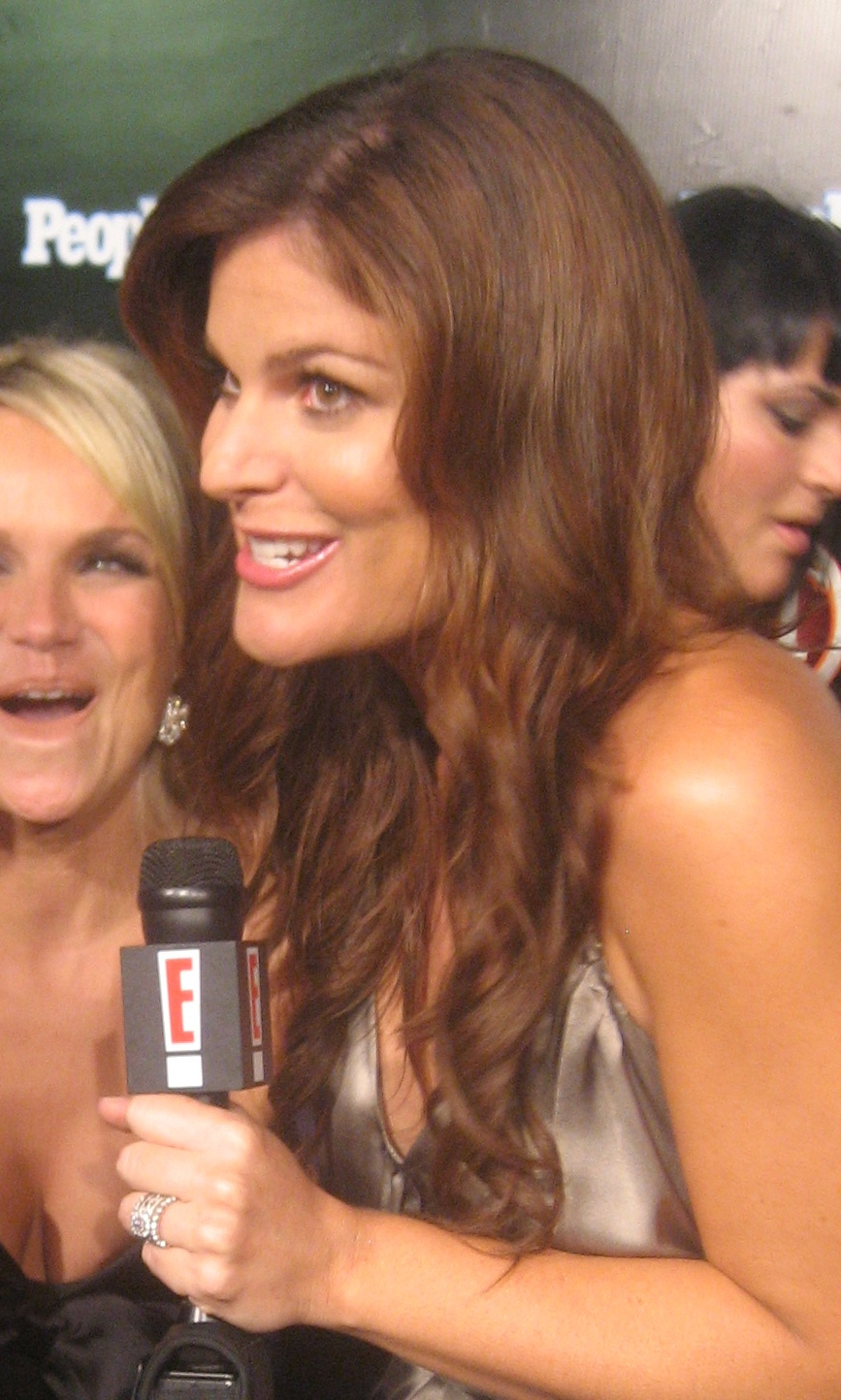
- Born: Kristin Veitch; February 24, 1975 (age 51); St. Louis, Missouri, U.S.
- Occupations: Entertainment reporter, columnist
- Years active: 2001–present
- Spouse: João dos Santos (m. 2007)
- Children: 2
- Website: www.eonline.com/news/watch_with_kristin

Kristin dos Santos (née Veitch; born February 24, 1975) is an American entertainment reporter, writer and host, specializing in the coverage of television, award shows and all things Hollywood. She is best known as E!’s resident TV (and award-show) expert on E! News, E! Online, Live From the Red Carpet, Live From E!, Daily Pop and various digital platforms.

== Biography ==
=== Early life and career ===
Dos Santos was born in St. Louis, Missouri. Her family moved to San Diego, California the same year she was born. She graduated from Poway High School in Poway, California, then continued on to Loyola Marymount University in Los Angeles where she earned a Bachelor of Arts degree in communications. After college she went to work for Southern California newspapers as a reporter and an editor before moving on to E!.

Dos Santos started out as a writer for E! Online, penning the “Watch with Kristin” column (originally “Watch with Wanda,” a nom de plum), which gave exclusive scoop on fan-favorite shows, including spoilers, castings, pickups, cancellations and more. It grew to become the most successful franchise on E! Online, including a digital show, "Watch With Kristin", which targeted TV fans.

Dos Santos has been a staple on E!’s award-show coverage and E! News, offering expert analysis, insight and insider info. She has appeared on CNN, MSNBC and other various radio and broadcast outlets, and has hosted digital series for NBC Universal, including the "Will and Grace After Party."

As Executive Editor, TV, Kristin oversees all television-related content for E! News, both digital and broadcast. She has moderated many panels for industry events, including PaleyFest, Comic Con, SAG and the TV Academy.

Dos Santos had a blog called on E!’s website where she talked about TV shows with the help of her reporters and interns. She used live interactive chat with fans where she took questions about their favorite shows, sometimes involving spoilers and "shipping" news for upcoming episodes. The chat transcripts were posted on the website. She also posted a weekly column on Fridays which was an often lengthy article about shows, sometimes containing interviews. Originally, she used the name "Wanda" as a nom de plume when she worked solely for E!Online on the web side for privacy reasons regarding the spoilers she reported, though she switched to using her real name once she began also working for the television side of E!.

While doing set visits as a journalist for E!, Dos Santos acted in a few small television roles. She has appeared in the television programs Summerland, Heroes, Tru Calling and Felicity. She played a dead body for one episode of Six Feet Under. Dos Santos played "The 30s Woman", a dead body that comes back to life in the third episode of Pushing Daisies.

=== Personal life ===
On July 14, 2007, she married João dos Santos, taking his surname as hers both personally and professionally two months later. The dos Santos family have two children, one born in 2009 and the other in 2011.

== Filmography ==
Television
Year	Title	Role	Notes
2002	Felicity	Bridesmaid	1 episode, uncredited
2004	Tru Calling	Body in Morgue	1 episode, uncredited
2004	Summerland	Reporter #1	1 episode
2006	Heroes	Roulette Dealer	1 episode
2007	Pushing Daisies	30s Woman	1 episode
2016	American Horror Story: Roanoke	Herself	1 episode
