= Kevin Durand =

Canadian actor (born 1974)

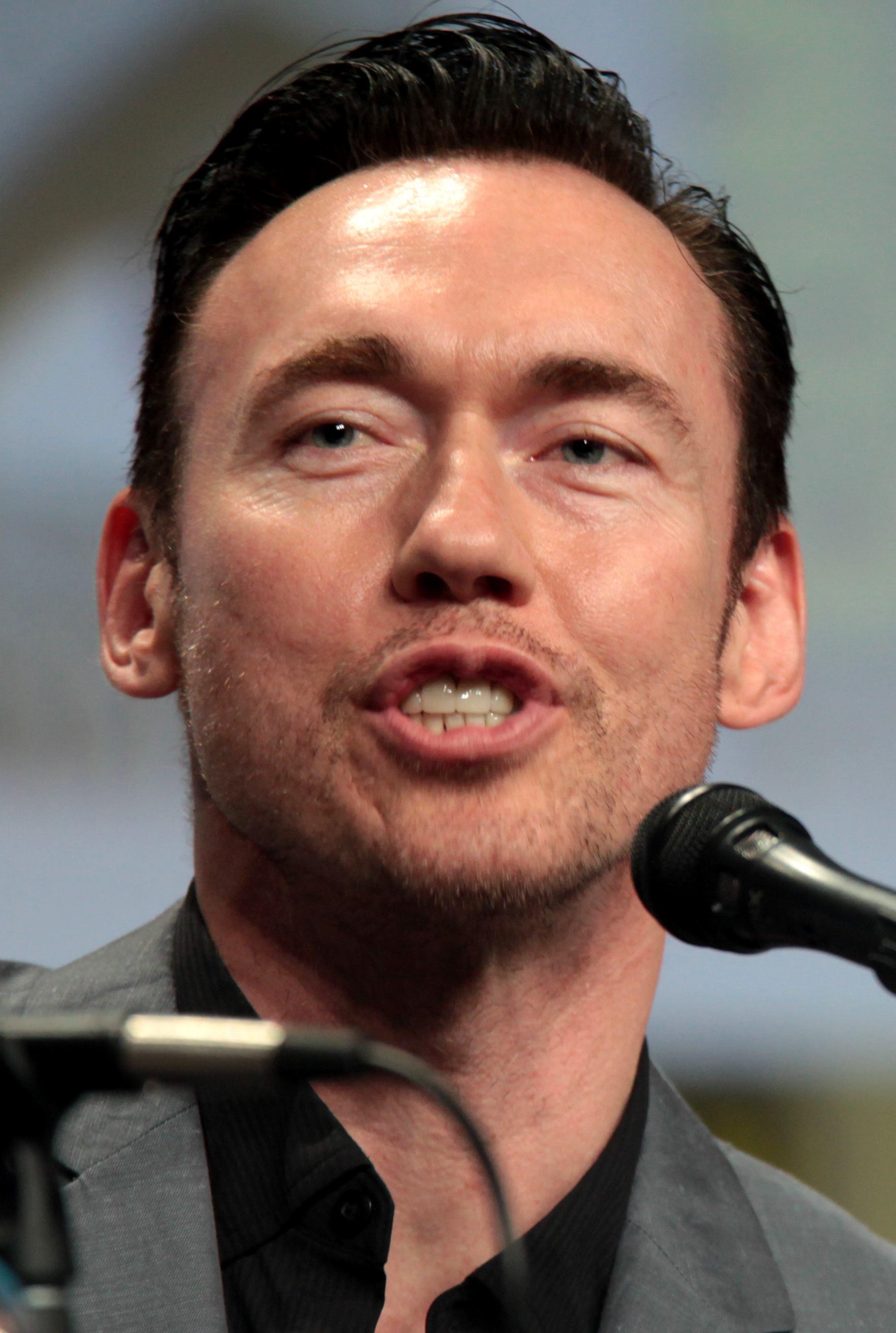
- Durand at the 2014 San Diego Comic Con
- Born: January 14, 1974 (age 52); Thunder Bay, Ontario, Canada
- Occupation: Actor
- Years active: 1994–present
- Spouse: Sandra Cho (m. 2010)
- Children: 2

Kevin Serge Durand (born January 14, 1974) is a Canadian actor. He is known for his work in numerous film and television roles, including portraying Vasiliy Fet in The Strain, Joshua in Dark Angel, Martin Keamy in Lost, Frederick Gideon in Locke & Key, Fred J. Dukes / The Blob in X-Men Origins: Wolverine, Barry Burton in Resident Evil: Retribution, Gabriel in Legion, Little John in Robin Hood, Jeeves Tremor in Smokin' Aces, Carlos in The Butterfly Effect, and Proximus Caesar in Kingdom of the Planet of the Apes. He received a 2012 Best Supporting Actor Genie nomination for his portrayal of Lenny Jackson in Citizen Gangster and Zipacna in the series Stargate SG-1.

== Early life ==
Kevin Serge Durand was born January 14, 1974, in Thunder Bay, Ontario, the son of Franco Ontarian parents Reina (née Perreault) and Serge Durand. He is a graduate of St. Ignatius High School.

== Career ==
Durand's first break came when he was cast in Mystery, Alaska. He often portrays characters on both sides of law enforcement, such as Booth in Walking Tall, sidekick Red in Wild Hogs, psychotic neo-nazi Jeeves Tremor in Smokin' Aces, the title role in Otis E., Gabriel in Legion, Little John in Robin Hood, Officer Caruso in Fruitvale Station, and hired thug Tucker in the 2007 remake of 3:10 to Yuma.

Durand appeared opposite Hugh Jackman in X-Men Origins: Wolverine as Blob and in Real Steel. In 2012, he co-starred in Citizen Gangster and David Cronenberg's Cosmopolis, and as video game character Barry Burton in the fifth installment of the Resident Evil movie franchise, Resident Evil: Retribution. In 2013, he appeared in the film The Mortal Instruments. He co-starred in Darren Aronofsky's Noah and two mid-2010s Atom Egoyan films, Devil's Knot and The Captive.

Durand has played series regulars on shows such as Joshua in Dark Angel, Vasiliy Fet in The Strain, Harbard the Wanderer in Vikings, Agent Jay Swopes in the American remake of Touching Evil, as well as guest roles on CSI, CSI: Miami, ER, Without a Trace, Dead Like Me and others. He also recurred on the television show Stargate SG-1 as Lord Zipacna, on Lost as Martin Keamy, and on the DC Universe 2019 season of Swamp Thing as Dr. Jason Woodrue, the Floronic Man.

In April 2024, Durand confirmed that he would be making his directorial and screenwriting debut with The Hockey Player, which he is co-writing with Adam MacDonald and has been developing since 2010.

== Personal life ==
Durand married his longtime girlfriend Sandra Cho on October 1, 2010. They have two daughters. He is a supporter of the Montreal Canadiens.

== Filmography ==
=== Film ===
Year	Film	Role	Notes
1999	Austin Powers: The Spy Who Shagged Me	Bazooka Marksman Joe	
1999	Mystery, Alaska	'Tree' Lane	
2002	K-9: P.I.	Agent Verner	
2004	The Butterfly Effect	Carlos	
2004	Scooby-Doo 2: Monsters Unleashed	Black Knight Ghost	
2004	Walking Tall	Booth	
2006	Big Momma's House 2	Oshima	
2006	Smokin' Aces	Jeeves Tremor	
2007	Wild Hogs	Red	
2007	Throwing Stars	Reed	
2007	3:10 to Yuma	Tucker	
2007	Stars	Carl	
2008	Greener Mountains	Three-toe	
2008	The Echo	Walter	
2008	Winged Creatures	Bagman	
2009	X-Men Origins: Wolverine	Fred Dukes / The Blob	
2009	Otis E.	Otis	
2010	Legion	Gabriel	
2010	Robin Hood	Little John	
2011	I Am Number Four	Mogadorian Commander	
2011	Citizen Gangster	Lenny Jackson	
2011	Real Steel	Ricky	
2012	Cosmopolis	Torval	
2012	Resident Evil: Retribution	Barry Burton	
2012	A Dark Truth	Tor	
2013	Devil's Knot	John Mark Byers	
2013	Fruitvale Station	Officer Caruso	
2013	The Mortal Instruments: City of Bones	Emil Pangborn	
2014	Dark Was the Night	Paul Shields	
2014	Winter's Tale	Cesar Tan	
2014	Noah	Rameel	
2014	The Captive	Mika	
2014	Garm Wars: The Last Druid	Skellig 58	
2017	Tragedy Girls	Lowell Orson Lehmann	
2018	Bigger	Bill Hauck	
2018	Take Point	Markus	
2019	Primal	Richard Loffler	
2021	Dangerous	Cole	
2024	Abigail	Peter	
2024	Kingdom of the Planet of the Apes	Proximus Caesar	Motion-capture and voice
2025	Clown in a Cornfield	Arthur Hill	
2025	The Naked Gun	Sig Gustafson	
2026	Ready or Not 2: Here I Come	Bill Wilkinson	
TBA	Ithaqua †	TBA	Filming
TBA	The Boy in the Iron Box †	TBA	Post-production

=== Television ===
Year	Film	Role	Notes
1997	Exhibit A: Secrets of Forensic Science	John Greer	Episode: "The Frankenstein of Sleep
1999	Hard Time: Hostage Hotel	Kenny, Flynn's henchman	TV film
2000	The Outer Limits	Alan	Episode: "Skin Deep"
2000	ER	Mr. Mooney	Episode: "Mars Attacks"
2000	Stargate SG-1	Lord Zipacna	3 episodes
2000–2001	Beggars and Choosers	Cliff	6 episodes
2001–2005	Andromeda	VX / Elysian	3 episodes
2001–2002	Dark Angel	Joshua	14 episodes
2002	Taken	Homeless Bloke on Train	Miniseries
2003	Dead Like Me	Chuck	Episode: "Sunday Mornings"
2003	Tarzan	Gregory Creal / Trevor Whedon	Episode: "Pilot"
2003	Mob Princess	Claudio	TV film
2004	The Goodbye Girl	Earl	TV film
2004	Touching Evil	Agent Jay Swopes	12 episodes
2005	The Collector	The Devil / Bus Driver	Episode: "The Tour Guide"
2005	Threshold	Crewman Sonntag	2 episodes
2005	CSI: Crime Scene Investigation	Connor Daly	Episode: "Still Life"
2006	Kyle XY	Police Officer at Party	Episode: "Pilot"
2006	The Dead Zone	Cabot	Episode: "Panic"
2006	12 Hours to Live	John Carl Lowman	TV film
2006	Without a Trace	Travis Holt	Episode: "The Damage Done"
2007	CSI: Miami	Mike Newberry	Episode: "Dangerous Son"
2007	Shark	Rick Carris	Episode: "No Holds Barred"
2008–2010	Lost	Martin Keamy	11 episodes
2010	American Dad!	CIA Guy (voice)	Episode: "Great Space Roaster"
2012	Republic of Doyle	Donnie Squires	Episode: "Streets of St. John's"
2014–2017	The Strain	Vasiliy Fet	Main role
2015–2016	Vikings	The Wanderer / Harbard	6 episodes
2017	Trial & Error	Rutger Hiss	4 episodes
2017–2018	Voltron: Legendary Defender	King Zarkon / Commander Mar	Voice role; 5 episodes
2018	Ballers	Werner Thompson	6 episodes
2019	Swamp Thing	Jason Woodrue / Floronic Man	10 episodes
2019	Wu Assassins	James Baxter / Earth Wu	Episode: "Legacy"
2021–2022	Locke & Key	Frederick Gideon	Recurring role (season 2); main role (season 3)
2022–2023	Pantheon	Anssi (voice)	
2023	Essex County	Jimmy	
TBA	Reacher †	Nokes	Main role (season 5)
