= Oceanic Airlines =

Fictional airline

The Oceanic Airlines logo, from the ABC TV series Lost.

Oceanic Airlines, and less frequently, Oceanic Airways, is the name of a fictional airline used in several films and television programs—typically works that feature plane crashes and other aviation disasters, with which a real airline would prefer not to be associated. Columnist Daryna Tobey compared its prevalence to that of 555 telephone numbers on television.

== History ==
Oceanic Airlines first appeared in the 1965 two-part episode "The Ditching" of the television series Flipper. It later appeared in the 1996 film Executive Decision, and footage of the Oceanic Airlines plane in that film was reused as stock footage for several works. Appearances since include the 2004–2010 television series Lost, the 2011 video game Dead Island, and a number of others.

== Ill-fated ==
The fictional airline typically appears in works that feature plane crashes and other aviation disasters, with which a real airline would prefer not to be associated. In the 2004–2010 television series Lost, Oceanic Airlines Flight 815 crashes on an island in the Pacific Ocean.

== Actual aircraft ==
The actual aircraft used for most of the film Executive Decision was a Boeing 747-269B with the aircraft registration number N707CK. It was scrapped in 2004 after service with Ocean Airlines as S2-ADT. The crash and ground scenes were filmed at Mojave Airport with a different aircraft, a retired Boeing 747-121. It stayed there retired after the filming, painted in Oceanic Airlines colors (with a dark hole painted on the fuselage), marked with the fake registration number N707CK; its actual registration numbers during service were N754PA, LX-FCV, and F-GIMJ.

== See also ==
- Fictional company
- Fictional brand
- Acme Corporation
