= Follow the Leader (Lost) =

- Lost episode
- John Locke is leading the Others toward Jacob.
- Episode no.: Season 5 Episode 15
- Directed by: Stephen Williams
- Written by: Paul Zbyszewski; Elizabeth Sarnoff
- Production code: 515
- Original air date: May 6, 2009
- Running time: 42 minutes

Guest appearances
- Nestor Carbonell as Richard Alpert; François Chau as Dr. Pierre Chang; Doug Hutchison as Horace Goodspeed; Patrick Fischler as Phil; Eric Lange as Stuart Radzinsky; David S. Lee as Young Charles Widmore; Alice Evans as Young Eloise Hawking; Leslie Ishii as Lara Chang; Sebastian Siegel as Erik; Kevin Chapman as Mitch; Elisabeth Blake as Vanessa; William Makozak as Captain Bird; Victoria Goring as Jeanette Lewis; Maya Henssens as Young Charlotte Lewis

Episode chronology
← Previous "The Variable"	Next → "The Incident"
- Lost season 5

"Follow the Leader" is the 15th television episode of the fifth season of ABC's Lost. The 101st episode of the show overall, "Follow the Leader" aired on May 6, 2009, on ABC in the United States. The episode was written by supervising producer Paul Zbyszewski and co-executive producer Elizabeth Sarnoff and directed by Stephen Williams. This episode marks the lowest recorded audience for Lost.

In 2007, John Locke (Terry O'Quinn) becomes the leader of the Others, but Ben (Michael Emerson) and Richard (Nestor Carbonell) start to be suspicious of Locke. In 1977, Jack Shephard (Matthew Fox) and Kate Austen (Evangeline Lilly) fight over whether to carry out the plan of the recently killed Daniel Faraday (Jeremy Davies). Sawyer (Josh Holloway) and Juliet (Elizabeth Mitchell) are interrogated by the DHARMA Initiative. Hugo "Hurley" Reyes (Jorge Garcia), Miles Straume (Ken Leung) and Jin-Soo Kwon (Daniel Dae Kim) finally reveal the truth to Dr. Pierre Chang (François Chau).

== Plot ==
=== 1977 ===
In 1977, following the events of the previous episode "The Variable", Jack Shephard (Matthew Fox) and Kate Austen (Evangeline Lilly) witness a young Eloise Hawking (Alice Evans) kill her son Daniel Faraday (Jeremy Davies). As Jack and Kate argue over if they should carry out Faraday's plan to detonate a hydrogen bomb in order to change the future, they are attacked and captured by the younger version of Charles Widmore (David S. Lee). Eloise believes their claim of being from the future and decides to take Jack's advice to detonate the bomb. They travel with Richard Alpert (Nestor Carbonell) to a pond, which has an underwater entry to a series of tunnels in which the bomb is stored. The tunnels lie beneath the site of the DHARMA barracks. Kate does not want to take part in Jack's plan and leaves. However, an Other refuses to let her go, prompting an unseen Sayid Jarrah (Naveen Andrews) to shoot the Other. Sayid agrees to Jack's plan, but Kate still refuses and compares Jack to John Locke (Terry O'Quinn), whom Jack once regarded as crazy. She leaves for the barracks and the others enter the tunnels.

At the DHARMA barracks, James "Sawyer" Ford (Josh Holloway) and Juliet Burke (Elizabeth Mitchell) are being held captive by Horace Goodspeed (Doug Hutchison), Stuart Radzinsky (Eric Lange) and Phil (Patrick Fischler). Sawyer does not answer any of Radzinsky's questions, even after he is severely beaten and witnesses Phil strike Juliet. Meanwhile, Dr. Pierre Chang (François Chau) confronts Hugo "Hurley" Reyes (Jorge Garcia), Miles Straume (Ken Leung), and Jin-Soo Kwon (Daniel Dae Kim) as they ready their escape to the beach. He wants to know if Faraday was correct concerning time travel. Chang asks Hurley time-specific questions which he fails to answer correctly; Hurley then concedes they are indeed from the future. Miles confirms that he is Chang's son, and supports Faraday's request for the island to be evacuated. Chang informs Horace and Radzinsky of this, and Sawyer makes a deal to leave the island on the submarine in exchange for telling them what they want to hear. Sawyer and Juliet, followed by Kate, are placed aboard the submarine in handcuffs. The sub departs.

=== 2007 ===
In 2007, following the events of the episode "Dead is Dead," Locke meets with Richard at the Others' camp and tells him that he now has a purpose. Sun-Hwa Kwon (Yunjin Kim) confronts Richard about the fate of her husband and the other survivors stranded in the past. Richard grimly informs her that he watched them all die. Locke, Richard, and Ben Linus (Michael Emerson) travel to the location where the time-jumping Locke will appear, so that Richard can remove the bullet from his leg and tell him what needs to be done (as seen in "Because You Left"). They return to camp, where Locke speaks to the Others and tells them that they are going on a trip to see Jacob, from whom they take orders but have never met. Locke tells Sun that Jacob will know how to save their friends. However, he later admits to Ben that his plan is not to ask Jacob for help, but to kill him.

== Reception ==
This episode gained 8.70 million American viewers, the lowest number in Lost's history. In Australia, it brought in 266,000 viewers, ranking forty-ninth for the night.
