= Pierre Chang =

Lost character

- Lost character
- François Chau as Pierre Chang in the fifth season episode "The Variable"
- First appearance: "Orientation" (2005)
- Last appearance: "The New Man in Charge" (2010)
- Created by: J. J. Abrams; Damon Lindelof
- Portrayed by: François Chau

In-universe information
- Full name: Pierre Chang
- Aliases: Marvin Candle; Edgar Halliwax; Mark Wickmund
- Species: Human
- Gender: Male
- Occupation: Astrophysicist; DHARMA Initiative scientist
- Spouse: Lara Chang
- Children: Miles Straume (son)
- Origin: Ann Arbor, Michigan, U.S.

Dr. Pierre Chang is a fictional character portrayed by François Chau on the ABC television series Lost. He is introduced in the second season through a Dharma Initiative orientation film under the alias Marvin Candle. A theoretical astrophysicist and senior Dharma scientist, Chang appears throughout the series under several aliases.

In the fifth season premiere "Because You Left", Chang makes his first appearance outside of the orientation films. In the episode "Follow the Leader", during the time-travel storyline, Chang learns that Miles Straume (Ken Leung), a member of the Kahana freighter crew sent to the Island, is his son. As the events leading up to the incident, Chang is present at the Swan station during drilling operations. When the drill strikes an electromagnetic pocket, he is caught in the resulting disaster and loses his arm. After these events, he is not seen again in the main timeline.

A puppet version built by Jim Henson's Creature Shop appears in Lost Untangled for the final season (played by Allan Trautman), with an appearance by the real Chang close to the end of the series.

== Arc ==
In the 1970s, Chang was a senior scientist for the Dharma Initiative, a research organization operating on the Island. He lived there with his wife Lara (Leslie Ishii) and their infant son Miles, while overseeing station operations and recruitment. Chang later appeared in Dharma Initiative orientation films under aliases, to protect his identity from "The Hostiles" (as called by the Dharma Initiative members) or "The Others" (as called by the survivors, including the Oceanic Flight 815 survivors).

In season two, Chang appears in a series of Dharma Initiative orientation films recorded during the 1970s under several aliases, including a 1980 Swan station film shown to Jack Shephard (Matthew Fox), John Locke (Terry O'Quinn), and Desmond Hume (Henry Ian Cusick). In the film, he explains the Swan station's purpose as an electromagnetic research station, describes an incident involving a release of electromagnetic energy, and instructs that a code must be entered into a computer every 108 minutes to prevent another event. Chang appears in the Swan station orientation film under the alias Dr. Marvin Candle, which is discovered by Mr. Eko (Adewale Akinnuoye-Agbaje) and shown to Locke. In the missing section of the film, Chang warns that the station's computer should only be used to enter the code and not for communication with the outside world, as it could compromise the experiment and lead to another incident. Chang appears in the Pearl station orientation film under the alias Mark Wickmund, where he explains the station's purpose, the Dharma Initiative's experiments, and the use of its pneumatic tube system. The film also introduces other Dharma facilities, including the Barracks and the Pala Ferry.

In season three, Chang appears under the alias Marvin Candle in a random-access procedures video on the Flame station computer, unlocked through a chess program, where he explains communication codes, system overrides, and a self-destruct protocol to be used in the event of the Hostiles incursion. He appears wearing a Dharma lab coat marked with the Flame logo and does not identify himself. Chang appears in an orientation video for the Barracks viewed by young Ben Linus (Sterling Beaumon) and Annie (Madeline Carroll), and in later recordings warns personnel about restricted areas such as the sonic fence while providing safety guidance about the Island's hazards, with these materials later discovered by the survivors of Oceanic Flight 815 crash and serving as secondary information. Chang appears in the fourth season finale under his alias Edgar Halliwax, through an orientation film for the Orchid station, a Dharma Initiative research facility. While Locke watches the recording inside the station, Chang begins explaining experiments involving time travel and "negatively charged exotic matter" before the tape malfunctions and rewinds.

In season five, Chang makes his first appearance outside of the orientation films. Four decades before the plane crash, he oversees operations on the Island and investigates an energy source discovered beneath the future Orchid station, where he first encounters Daniel Faraday (Jeremy Davies), who is posing as a Dharma worker. In 1977, he was assigned to giving new members their jumpsuits and work duties. One of these new arrivals was Jack, who was given the job of "Workman" based on his entrance exam. During this period, Chang interacts with Miles Straume (Ken Leung) without knowing that Miles is his future son. He later learns the truth after Miles reveals their relationship, prompting Chang to ensure that his infant son is evacuated from the island before the Incident. After Faraday warns that drilling at the Swan station could trigger a catastrophic electromagnetic event, Chang gradually becomes convinced that time travel is occurring on the Island and that the warning is genuine. He orders an evacuation of the Island, but Dharma leadership under Stuart Radzinsky (Eric Lange) continues the drilling operation. Chang attempts to stop the project, but the drilling releases a powerful electromagnetic force, causing an event later known as the incident. During the disaster, he suffers severe injuries to his left arm and escapes the site. He later appears in the Swan orientation film, where he explains the station's button protocol and references the Incident while wearing a prosthetic hand.

In the 2007 flash sideways timeline, Chang works as a museum scientist alongside Charlotte Lewis (Rebecca Mader). His son Miles becomes a police detective. Chang also appears at a museum fundraising event organized by Hurley and later introduces a benefit concert featuring Daniel and Charlie Pace (Dominic Monaghan) with his band Drive Shaft. In the epilogue, Chang continues appearing in Dharma Initiative orientation materials, explaining station functions, alternate identities, and experimental procedures, while also answering operational questions about multiple Dharma stations and their purposes. At the Dharma Logistics Warehouse in Guam, Ben shows Dharma personnel Hector (Ted Rooney) and Glen (Ray Porter) the Hydra orientation video featuring Chang, in which he explains Room 23, experiments on polar bears, the Hurley-birds, and his use of aliases in other instructional videos.

== Development ==
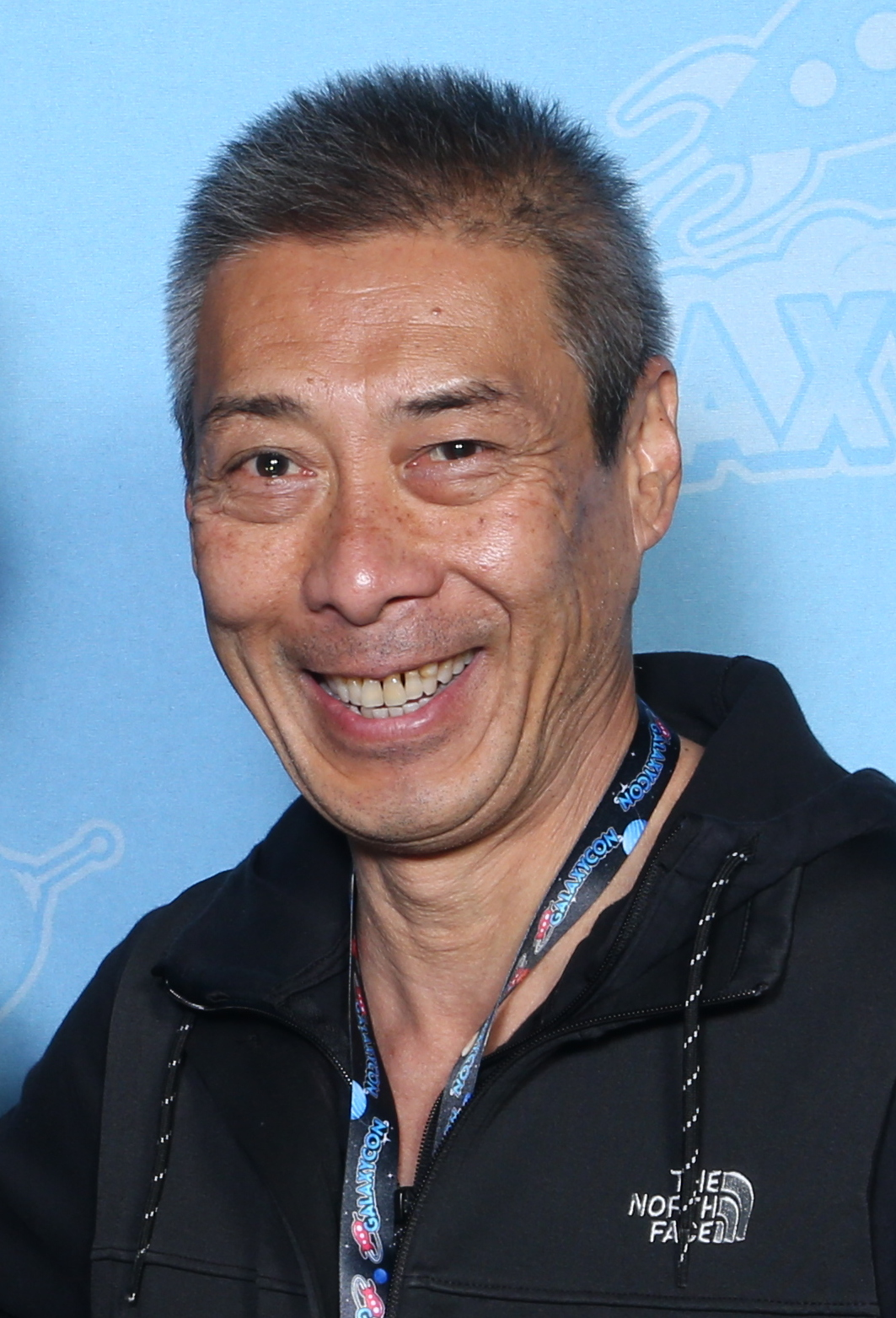
Chau appears in 17 episodes, (Note: The 17-episode count includes two-part episodes such as "The Incident" and "The End", which are counted separately.) mainly in Dharma Initiative orientation films and the fifth season time-travel storyline.

Cambodian actor François Chau was originally cast for a single appearance in an orientation film within the series, portraying Chang under the alias Marvin Candle. The producers later contacted him for additional appearances, and the role was expanded as the character continued to appear throughout the series. In an interview with Splice Today, Chau described his character as "basically a good man who did some bad things." The first film was recorded on a reused set from Alias, a series also created by Lost co-creator J. J. Abrams. Early recordings took place in Burbank before later production moved to Hawaii as the character became part of the main Dharma storyline.

Chau typically wears a white coat bearing the logo of a Dharma Initiative station. In the series finale, he reprised the role, and his name was included among the main cast in the episode's credits. Chau described the audition process as "straightforward", noting that he performed a long monologue in a single take. The character appeared in the epilogue "The New Man in Charge", in which an orientation video features Chang explaining the purpose and experiments of the Hydra station. The Los Angeles Times noted that Chang is shown as a parent who sends his wife and child off the Island for safety.

In 2008, Chang appears in the Dharma Booth Video, which was screened at a Dharma Initiative booth during the San Diego Comic-Con, where he is seen alongside Daniel Faraday while recording a video. In 2024, filmmaker Taylor Morden and the producers behind Getting Lost, an independent documentary about the making of and cultural impact of the television series, released a promotional video featuring Chang's new alias, Jacques Chandler. The video served as a nod to the series while promoting the documentary and its crowdfunding campaign, which helped fund the project.

== Reception ==
Ryan Smith of Comic Book Resources described Chang as a central mystery within the series and noted that his storyline connects directly to Miles Straume's personal history. Nathan Sharp of Screen Rant described Chang as an important Dharma figure whose actions influence major events on the Island, especially those involving Dharma infrastructure and his family.

Noel Murray of The A.V. Club wrote about Chang's appearances in the Dharma Initiative orientation films, noting the character's use of multiple identities, including Marvin Candle, and his connection to the series' expanding mythology. Jeff Jensen of Entertainment Weekly noted that the season five premiere opened with Chang, a character associated with the series' science-fiction and mystery elements. Referring to him as "the Dharma Dude of Many Names", he wrote that Chang's appearance helped establish the season's focus on time travel and the Dharma Initiative. In a ranking of Lost characters published by Hollywood.com, Chang was placed 38th out of 76 characters, with the article commenting that "smart men make bad dads."
