= Orientation (Lost) =

- Lost episode
- An orientation film of the recently introduced by Dr. Marvin Candle at the Swan Station of the Dharma Initiative
- Episode no.: Season 2 Episode 3
- Directed by: Jack Bender
- Written by: Javier Grillo-Marxuach; Craig Wright
- Production code: 203
- Original air date: October 5, 2005
- Running time: 42 minutes

Guest appearances
- Adewale Akinnuoye-Agbaje as Mr. Eko; Kevin Tighe as Anthony Cooper; Henry Ian Cusick as Desmond Hume; Katey Sagal as Helen Norwood; Curtis Jackson as Security guard; Michael Lanzo as Waiter; Jeanne Rogers as Moderator; Roxie Sarhangi as Francine; François Chau as Dr. Marvin Candle

Episode chronology
← Previous "Adrift"	Next → "Everybody Hates Hugo"
- Lost season 2

"Orientation" is the third episode of the second season of Lost and the 28th episode overall. The episode was directed by Jack Bender, and written by Javier Grillo-Marxuach and Craig Wright. It first aired on October 5, 2005, on ABC.

Jack Shephard (Matthew Fox), John Locke (Terry O'Quinn) and Kate Austen (Evangeline Lilly) learn about the mysterious hatch from Desmond Hume (Henry Ian Cusick). On the other side of the island, Michael Dawson (Harold Perrineau), James "Sawyer" Ford (Josh Holloway) and Jin-Soo Kwon (Daniel Dae Kim) are imprisoned by people they believe to be the "Others."

== Plot ==
=== Flashbacks ===
Locke is participating in a support group, where he emotionally recounts the deception perpetrated by his father. Afterwards, a group member, Helen Norwood (Katey Sagal), approaches him in sympathy, and they become romantically involved. After spending the night together, Helen wakes up to find Locke getting dressed, claiming he is uncomfortable sleeping in an unfamiliar bed. He goes out to sit in his car outside his father's (Kevin Tighe) estate. His father confronts him, saying he knows that Locke has been stalking him, and tells him that he's not wanted.

To celebrate six months together, Helen gives Locke a present: her house key, under the condition that he stop going to his father's house. Locke agrees, but is unable to keep his word. Helen eventually follows and confronts him. She says he is afraid of moving past what his father has done, and of moving forward with her. She tells him it is meant to be difficult, because what she is asking from him is a leap of faith.

=== In the Hatch ===
At the underground compound, the confrontation between Jack, Desmond and Locke provides enough of a distraction for Kate to knock Desmond down. However, he gets off a shot, which damages the computer. Desmond claims that everyone will die unless the computer is fixed. Kate heads off to fetch Sayid via an alternate exit.

Desmond explains that three years earlier, his boat crashed on the island. He then met a man who enlisted his help in his sole duty: entering a code into the computer every 108 minutes (notably, 108 is the sum of the numbers 4, 8, 15, 16, 23 and 42). Desmond claims that "the end of the world" will come if the button is not pressed.

He directs Jack and Locke to watch a short orientation film from 1980, narrated by a scientist named Dr. Marvin Candle (François Chau). Candle describes a multi-research project created in 1970 by Gerald and Karen DeGroot and funded by Alvar Hanso, called the DHARMA Initiative and states the name and rough purpose of the hatch as an electromagnetic research station of DHARMA called "The Swan", the third of six similar stations built by them. He explains that shortly after the hatch was built, there was an incident. The viewers must enter the code into the computer every 108 minutes, specifically at the 4 minute mark on the timer, to prevent that incident from happening again. Candle also warns the viewers about using the computer for anything else but the film suddenly cuts to him wishing good luck. Jack believes that all this is just a social experiment, but Locke feels the film should be taken at its word. Desmond attempts to power up the computer, without success. He panics and leaves.

Jack runs after Desmond in the woods. Desmond recognizes him as a man whom he met in a stadium, and asks what happened to the girl Jack was operating on. Jack, upset, answers that he married her - but he's not married anymore. Desmond leaves, and Jack returns to the compound.

Sayid Jarrah (Naveen Andrews) successfully repairs the computer. Locke tells Jack he should be the one to hit the button, but Jack refuses. As the alarms sound, Locke asks Jack why it is so hard to believe, and Jack asks Locke why he finds it so easy. Locke tells him it was never easy, but that Jack needs to make a leap of faith of his own. With one second to spare, Jack presses the button. The timer resets.

=== Across the Island ===
On the beach, Michael and Sawyer discover Jin, being chased by five people whom Jin identifies as the Others. The three are knocked unconscious and thrown into a pit. Another prisoner (Michelle Rodriguez) is later dropped into the pit. She introduces herself as Ana Lucia Cortez, another survivor of Oceanic Flight 815. Ana Lucia was in the tail section, which crashed on the opposite side of the island from the fuselage. Sawyer tells her that he plans to shoot the guard the next time he appears. Ana Lucia suddenly grabs Sawyer's gun and calls for the guard (Adewale Akinnuoye-Agbaje), revealing herself to have been planted in the pit to gain information from the prisoners.

== Production ==
The writing team was afraid that the hatch scenes would be heavy on exposition and drag on. The solution they found was shooting the computer, which would create a crisis and tension as the device needed to be repaired in 108 minutes, and also allow for new information to be given "on the fly".

This episode marks the first appearance of series regular Mr. Eko, played by Adewale Akinnuoye-Agbaje, where he was only shown briefly, knocking down three of the show's main characters with a stick. Akinnuoye-Agbaje was given the stick and told to "Knock those three guys out". Akinnuoye-Agbaje felt that "there's no better way to make an entrance".

== Reception ==
22.38 million American viewers watched this episode when it originally aired.
