= The New Man in Charge =

Epilogue of Lost

- Lost episode
- Directed by: Paul Edwards
- Written by: Melinda Hsu Taylor; Graham Roland; Jim Galasso
- Original release date: August 24, 2010
- Running time: 12 minutes

Guest appearances
- Jorge Garcia as Hugo "Hurley" Reyes; Michael Emerson as Ben Linus; Malcolm David Kelley as Walt Lloyd (Note: Uncredited.); François Chau as Pierre Chang; Ted Rooney as Hector; Ray Porter as Glenn; Grisel Toledo as Susie Lazenby

"The New Man in Charge" is the epilogue of ABC's serial drama television series Lost. It was written by Melinda Hsu Taylor, Graham Roland and Jim Galasso, and directed by Paul Edwards. Though it never aired on television, the epilogue was released on August 24, 2010, as part of the DVD release for the sixth and final season of the series. On August 6, 2010, the epilogue was leaked online, 18 days before the official release.

The epilogue focuses on the actions taken by the characters of Hugo "Hurley" Reyes (Jorge Garcia) and Ben Linus (Michael Emerson), after the events of the series finale, "The End". "The New Man in Charge" incorporates answers that were intended to be part of season 6, but were not included due to running time. Also, Malcolm David Kelley reprises his role as Walt Lloyd, who was absent for the entirety of the sixth season, excluding archived footage, and was not seen since the seventh episode of season five.

== Plot ==
=== Orote Peninsula, Guam ===
Some time after the events of "The End," in 2010, Ben visits two Dharma Initiative workers, Hector (Ted Rooney) and Glenn (Ray Porter), in a warehouse in Guam. Ben dismisses the two workers from their job of loading a food pallet as he is "tying up loose ends", and after paying them reveals that the Dharma Initiative has not been in existence for over twenty years. Before Ben can leave, the workers request some answers, and he complies by showing them the orientation film of the Dharma Initiative's Hydra Station. The video reveals that Dr. Pierre Chang (François Chau) was not using an alias at the time, as his name had not been "leaked to a third party." The video explores the nature of the Hydra Station's experiments on hybrid birds and time travel experiments on polar bears, as well as the purpose of Room 23, which was created to interrogate "the Hostiles" regarding Jacob (Mark Pellegrino).

=== Santa Rosa Mental Health Institute ===
Ben arrives at Santa Rosa Mental Health Institute and visits Walt. He reminds Walt that he is special and that back on the Island he will be able to help his father, Michael, even though Michael is dead. Ben tells Walt that the Island is his home and he has to go back. Together, they leave Santa Rosa. When Ben and Walt reach a DHARMA van, they find Hurley waiting for them. Walt tells Hurley that he had long waited for the survivors to come back for him, and that he had been labeled insane because no one believed his story. Hurley reassures him that he's not insane at all, and attributes Walt's existential distress to his separation from the Island. He tells Walt that the Island is his home, and that he intends to talk to Walt about a job. Hurley then suggests they all go home, and the van drives away into the night.

== Production ==
The epilogue answered some of the series' long-running questions, such as the supply drops, the "Hurley bird", and Room 23. Co-creator/executive producer Damon Lindelof and executive producer Carlton Cuse intended some of the storyline and the answers in the epilogue to be part of season 6. However, the running time caused the creators to remove some of the intended moments from season 6 and incorporate them in "The New Man in Charge".

In an interview, Michael Emerson stated, "The writers weren't dealing with procedural mysteries in the finale. They were bringing the show to kind of a spiritual conclusion, and that was the right emphasis I think ... I'd have to say that this DVD extra feature thing is lighter-spirited and a little more mechanical in the best sense of that word. And we do have the satisfaction of seeing what happened to some of the people whose storylines were not resolved in the finale" In a later interview, Emerson said that the epilogue scene seems to set up a new spinoff series. However, he denied that the writers were actively developing a spinoff project, explaining, "I don't think it was their idea to leave such a door open" Following the completion of the epilogue, Lindelof wrote on his Twitter page, "I'm so glad we made 'The New Man in Charge'. I was starting to miss getting yelled at."

== Reception ==
"The New Man in Charge" received generally positive reviews from critics. Sam McPherson of TV Overmind graded the epilogue an A, deeming, "If you didn't like 'The End', you'll probably love this. And if you liked 'The End', well, you’ll still probably love it." Alan Sepinwall of Star Ledger was also satisfied with the epilogue, stating, "I went into 'The New Man in Charge' not expecting some crucial missing chapter from the Lost saga, but a chance to spend a few more minutes with Benjamin Linus and Hugo Reyes, and to maybe get a few blanks filled in ... And since that's what I got, I was satisfied.

Entertainment Weekly writer Jeff "Doc" Jensen gave the epilogue a mixed review, stating, "I accept 'The End' as the conclusion to the final chapter of Lost that was season 6. So I choose to view 'The New Man In Charge' as the official epilogue to that story, not a new final chapter, as it conforms best to most definitions of 'epilogue' that I've found."
