= Anthony Cooper =

Anthony Cooper may refer to:

- Anthony Cooper (baseball) (1904–1979), American Negro league baseball player
- Anthony Cooper (Lost)
- Anthony Cooper (racing driver); see 1964 Armstrong 500

== See also ==
- Tony Cooper (disambiguation)
- Anthony Ashley-Cooper (disambiguation)
- Cooper (surname)
