= Anthony Ashley =

Anthony Ashley may refer to:

- Sir Anthony Ashley, 1st Baronet (1551–1628), MP and clerk of the Privy Council
- Evelyn Ashley (Anthony Evelyn Melbourne Ashley, 1836–1907), British author and politician

== See also ==
- Anthony Ashley-Cooper (disambiguation)
