= Tony Cooper =

Tony Cooper may refer to:

- Tony Cooper (footballer) in the FA Youth Cup Finals of the 1970s
- Tony Cooper (trade unionist) (born 1943), British trade union leader
- Tony Cooper (umpire), see 2006 ICC EAP Cricket Trophy (One day)

== See also ==
- Anthony Cooper (disambiguation)
- Cooper (surname)
