= Anthony Ashley-Cooper =

Anthony Ashley-Cooper may refer to:

- Anthony Ashley Cooper, 1st Earl of Shaftesbury (1621–1683), English nobleman
- Anthony Ashley-Cooper, 2nd Earl of Shaftesbury (1652–1699), English nobleman
- Anthony Ashley-Cooper, 3rd Earl of Shaftesbury (1671–1713), English nobleman and philosopher
- Anthony Ashley Cooper, 4th Earl of Shaftesbury (1711–1771), English nobleman
- Anthony Ashley-Cooper, 5th Earl of Shaftesbury (1761–1811), English nobleman
- Anthony Ashley-Cooper, 7th Earl of Shaftesbury (1801–1885), English nobleman
- Anthony Ashley-Cooper, 8th Earl of Shaftesbury (1831–1886), English nobleman
- Anthony Ashley-Cooper, 9th Earl of Shaftesbury (1869–1961), English nobleman
- Anthony Ashley-Cooper, 10th Earl of Shaftesbury (1938–2004), English nobleman
- Anthony Ashley-Cooper, 11th Earl of Shaftesbury (1977–2005), English nobleman
- Anthony Henry Ashley-Cooper (1807–1858), MP for Dorchester
- Anthony Ashley-Cooper, Lord Ashley (1900–1947), British army officer

== See also ==
- Anthony Ashley (disambiguation)
- Anthony Cooper (disambiguation)
- Earl of Shaftesbury
