= The Incident (Lost) =

- Lost episodes
- Jack Shephard (Matthew Fox) prepares to use the hydrogen bomb core on the electromagnetic pocket.
- Episode nos.: Season 5 Episodes 16 and 17
- Directed by: Jack Bender
- Written by: Damon Lindelof; Carlton Cuse
- Production code: 516 & 517
- Original air date: May 13, 2009
- Running time: 86 minutes

Guest appearances
- Mark Pellegrino as Jacob; Titus Welliver as Man in Black; Zuleikha Robinson as Ilana Verdansky; Jeff Fahey as Frank Lapidus; Nestor Carbonell as Richard Alpert; François Chau as Dr. Pierre Chang; Eric Lange as Stuart Radzinsky; Brad William Henke as Bram; L. Scott Caldwell as Rose Nadler; Sam Anderson as Bernard Nadler; John Terry as Christian Shephard; Alice Evans as Young Eloise Hawking; Patrick Fischler as Phil; Jon Gries as Roger Linus; Andrea Gabriel as Nadia Jazeem; Emily Rae Argenti as Young Kate Austen; Keegan Boos as Young Sawyer; George Gerdes as Mr. Springer; Amy Stewart as Juliet's mother; Savannah Lathem as Young Rachel Carlson; Daniel James Kunkel as Anesthesiologist; John Pete as Prison clerk; Sally Davis as Woman; Kevin Chapman as Mitch; Tanner Maguire as Young Tom Brennan; Agnes Kwak as Aunt Soo; Rylee Fansler as Young Juliet Carlson; William Makozak as Captain Bird; Sonya Masinovsky as Nurse; Colby French as Uncle Doug; Michael Trisler as Juliet's father; Adam Bazzi as Taxi driver

Episode chronology
← Previous "Follow the Leader"	Next → "LA X"
- Lost season 5

"The Incident" is the season finale of the fifth season of ABC's Lost, consisting of the 16th and 17th episodes. Both parts of "The Incident", the show's 102nd and 103rd episodes overall, aired on May 13, 2009, on ABC in the United States. The episode was written by executive producers and showrunners Damon Lindelof and Carlton Cuse and directed by Jack Bender.

Jack Shephard's (Matthew Fox) plan to change the future is met with resistance from others, while John Locke (Terry O'Quinn) assigns Ben Linus (Michael Emerson) a difficult task. This episode features the first appearance of the mysterious leader of the Others, Jacob, after being mentioned several times throughout the series. Jacob is portrayed by Mark Pellegrino and appears in the flashbacks of various Oceanic Flight 815 survivors and mysterious Ajira Flight 316 survivor Ilana (Zuleikha Robinson).

The episode was watched by 9.428 million viewers, and was well received by critics and audiences. It was also nominated for the Primetime Emmy Award for Outstanding Writing for a Drama Series in 2009.

== Plot ==
=== Flashbacks ===
Jacob (Mark Pellegrino) weaves a tapestry inside a temple-like room. While eating a fish near the statue of Taweret, he is visited by a man in black (Titus Welliver). The man comments that Jacob has brought the Black Rock to the island and states he will eventually find a loophole so he can kill Jacob.

At different points in their lives, various characters encounter Jacob. As a child, Kate is visited by Jacob after being caught stealing a lunchbox. He pays for it to keep the shopkeeper from calling the police. An eight-year old Sawyer is visited after his parents' funeral. He has started writing his letter to the con man Tom Sawyer but his pen runs out of ink. Jacob gives him a replacement. Sayid is visited when his wife Nadia is killed. Ilana is visited by Jacob in a Russian hospital, who asks for her help. After being pushed out of a window by his father, Locke apparently dies. However, when Jacob touches him, Locke comes back to life. While visiting Sun and Jin's wedding, Jacob tells them that their love is special. After performing his first solo surgery on a young girl, (Note: a story he recounts in "Pilot, Part 1".) Jack tries to buy a chocolate bar from a vending machine and argues with his father (John Terry) for interrupting him during the surgery. Jacob buys the same bar and gives Jack one. Hurley is visited after being released from prison. (Note: Between "The Little Prince" and "316".) Jacob says that Hurley may be blessed, and that his ability to see dead people could be a gift. He tells Hurley about Flight 316 and leaves a guitar case for him. Jacob makes physical contact with each of the characters in their respective scene, except Ilana.

In a flashback not featuring Jacob, Juliet's parents tell her that they are getting divorced, claiming they were not meant to be together.

=== 1977 ===
Kate (Evangeline Lilly), Juliet (Elizabeth Mitchell) and Sawyer (Josh Holloway) are on a submarine leaving the Island. (Note: Following the events of the previous episode, "Follow the Leader".) Kate convinces Juliet and Sawyer to stop Jack from detonating the hydrogen bomb. They force the captain to surface, instructing the captain to continue on course away from the island. On the island, they are greeted by Vincent, who has been in the care of Rose Henderson (L. Scott Caldwell) and Bernard Nadler (Sam Anderson) for the past three years. Rose and Bernard live near the beach, avoiding detection by the DHARMA Initiative. Rose points them to the DHARMA barracks and they leave.

Meanwhile, Jack (Matthew Fox) and Sayid (Naveen Andrews) dismantle the bomb in the tunnels under the barracks to remove the core. Richard (Nestor Carbonell) and a younger Eloise (Alice Evans) assist them in entering the barracks through the basement of one of the houses. Richard knocks out Eloise to prevent her from traveling with them because she is pregnant. Sayid dons a DHARMA jumpsuit; they almost escape but Roger Linus (Jon Gries) recognizes him and shoots him. Jack and Sayid escape in a van driven by Hurley (Jorge Garcia), along with Jin (Daniel Dae Kim) and Miles (Ken Leung). Hurley drives to the construction site of the Swan, while Jack treats Sayid's wounds; however, they are stopped by Juliet, Sawyer and Kate.

Sawyer thinks they should not change the past. Jack claims it is his destiny to do it and that John Locke (Terry O'Quinn) has always been right about the island. Jack and Sawyer get into a fight, which is broken up by Juliet, who now agrees with Jack. She tells Sawyer that although they love each other, they are not meant to be together.

Meanwhile, Dr. Chang (François Chau) continues drilling into the energy source beneath the construction site of the Swan station on the orders of Stuart Radzinsky (Eric Lange).

With everyone now in agreement, Jack enters the construction site while security officer Phil (Patrick Fischler) arrives with a team of armed men. A gunfight ensues, wherein the survivors gain the upper hand, allowing Jack to drop the bomb into the pit while the drill hits the energy source. The bomb fails to go off, and the pocket is breached, attracting every metal object in the area. In the ensuing chaos, Dr. Chang's arm is crushed, Phil is stabbed by a rebar, and Juliet is dragged into the chasm. Sawyer attempts to pull her up, and Juliet professes her love for him before falling. However, Juliet survives the fall, finds the undetonated bomb and hits it with a rock until it explodes.

=== 2007 ===
Locke, Ben (Michael Emerson), Sun (Yunjin Kim) and the Others travel to the remains of the Taweret statue, where Jacob resides. Locke assigns Ben the task of killing Jacob, reminding Ben of all the negative things that have happened to him. Ben admits he has never seen Jacob; all communication with Jacob was through notes brought by Richard, including the lists of people to be taken from the Oceanic 815 survivors.

Meanwhile, a group of survivors from Ajira Flight 316, including Ilana (Zuleikha Robinson) and Bram (Brad William Henke) travel to Jacob's cabin, with Frank Lapidus (Jeff Fahey) and a crate from the plane's cargo. They find the cabin deserted, and set it on fire after realizing someone else has been using it. They then travel to the statue.

Their group arrives after Ben and Locke enter a chamber in the base of the statue's remains. Ilana reveals the contents of the crate: John Locke's body. The Man in Black has been impersonating Locke. Inside the statue, Ben stabs Jacob to death, and his final words are a warning: "They're coming." The Man in Black kicks Jacob's body into the fire.

== Production ==
Throughout the previous seasons, the final scene of each season had a secret code name. This was to prevent spoilers from leaking out. Another factor to prevent the leak of spoilers was that only the writers, director, and actors involved with the scene were allowed access to the script. During a May podcast, executive producers/writers Damon Lindelof and Carlton Cuse invited fans to choose the code name for the finale of season five. After numerous suggestions, the two decided upon their favorite thirteen. These thirteen were then allowed to be voted on by fans as the name. The resulting name was "The Fork in the Outlet".

This episode breaks the tradition of ending with the "LOST" title screen, with the words in white and a black background. Instead, "LOST" is in black, and the background is white.

The Swan construction site was built in the same place the Hatch was shown in seasons 1 and 2, in He'eia. Due to being in a state park area, the producers had to get permits and work with geologists to excavate and build the set, as well as restoring the location to how it was before. The base of the statue where Jacob lives was a live-action set, but the stone foot was built with computer-generated imagery.

== Reception ==
The finale has been well received by audiences and critics alike. In a review for IGN, Chris Carabot praised the finale, calling it "heart-wrenching", and praised the performances, especially Michael Emerson and newcomer Mark Pellegrino, calling him "yet another example of some of the brilliant casting choices we've seen on this show." He went on to give the episode an overall score of 9.8, saying that he was "excited to see how this cliffhanger plays out in the final chapter of the series." Alan Sepinwall of the Star-Ledger reviewed the episode positively, but complained about the episode being "another explosive chapter" of the love triangle. Sepinwall also called it "so exciting, so mythology-intensive, so loaded with great performances and great character notes, so all-around kick-ass, that I feel more than satisfied." Jeff Jensen of PopWatch said that the opening scene with Jacob and his nemesis was enough to make the episode legendary.

Jay Glatfelter of The Huffington Post felt that the season finale was more of the first act of the show's final act, and thought that many of the themes were left unresolved.

Variety's Cynthia Littleton was pleased when Rose and Bernard returned in the episode, having been absent for most of the season. She speculated that they are the Adam and Eve skeletons found by the survivors early in season one, which Jeff Jensen from Entertainment Weekly also suspected. (This was not correct). James Poniewozik of Time also liked their appearance in "The Incident". Chris Carabott of IGN "love[d]" this scene as the characters were no longer watching the island mysteries, but had become part of them. He said "Their outlook is refreshing" and hoped they would feature more often in season six. Alan Sepinwall from The Star-Ledger called it "one of the best, most moving scenes of the finale". Noel Murray from The A.V. Club thought the scene was useful in both practical and thematic senses, as it allowed the characters to leave the show, but also it caused him to question whether opting out was "the voice of reason, or the voice of evil". The Huffington Post's Jay Glatfelter incorrectly thought their decision not to participate "all but solidified them as the 'Adam and Eve' from the caves". "Words [could not] describe" how pleased Maureen Ryan from the Chicago Tribune was with Rose and Bernard's scene, and she agreed with Rose's sentiment "It's always something with you people".

At the 2011 Young Artist Awards, Savannah Lathem received a nomination for Best Performance in a TV Series under the category "Guest Starring Young Actress".
