= Dharma Initiative =

Fictional organization in the television series Lost

Logo of the Dharma Initiative

The Dharma Initiative, also written DHARMA (Department of Heuristics and Research on Material Applications (Note: As revealed during the Lost Experience.)), is a fictional research project and organization featured in the television series Lost. It was introduced in the second season episode "Orientation". In 2008, the Dharma Initiative website was launched. (Note: Domain name Dharmawantsyou.com now defunct and in use by typo-squatter.) Dharma's interests were directly connected with fringe science. Dharma is a Sanskrit term used in Hinduism, Buddhism, Jainism, and Sikhism. The logo is an octagon with the word "dharma" inside, all inscribed inside a bagua.

== Background ==
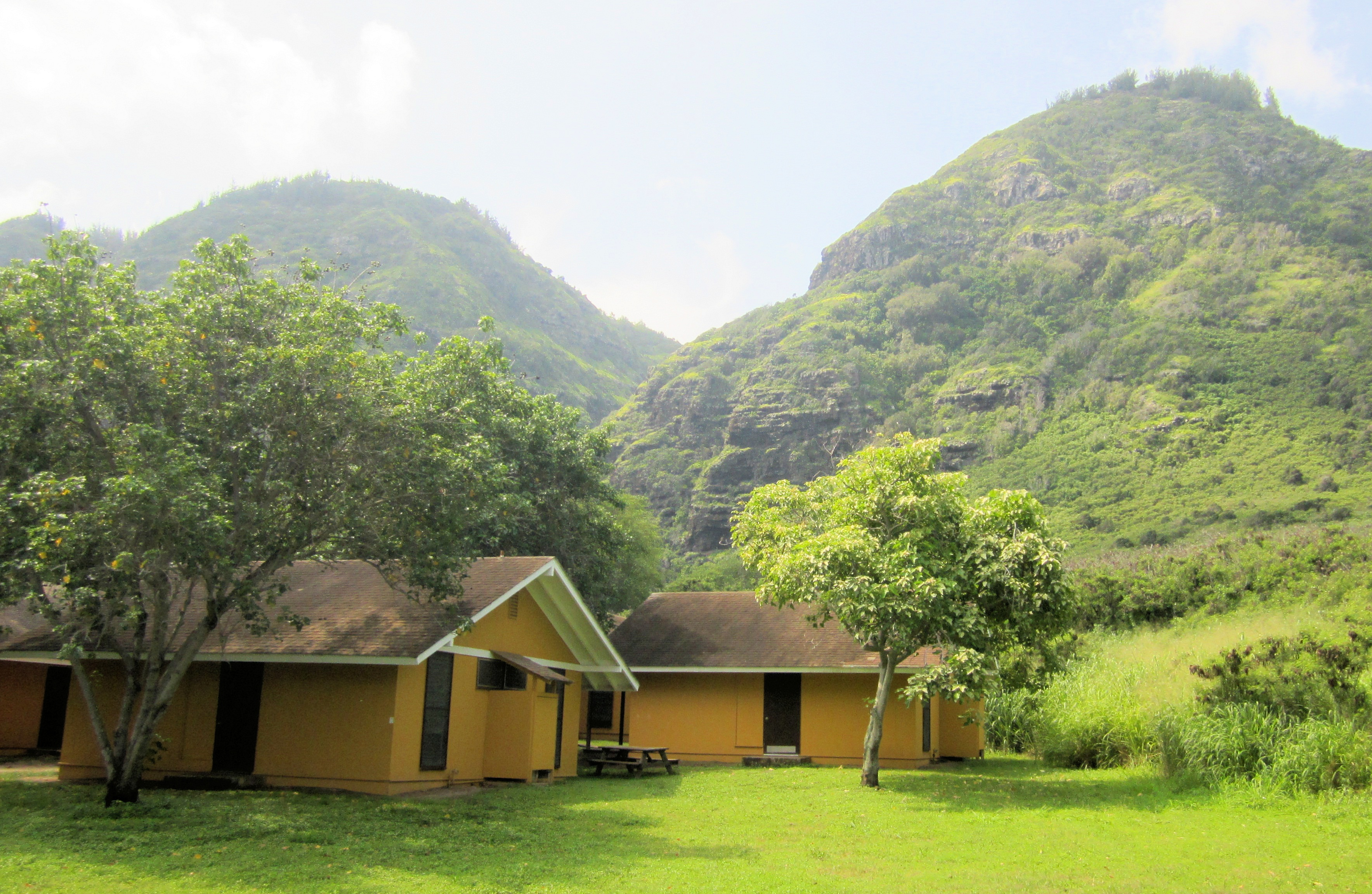
DHARMA-Houses

The Dharma Initiative and its origins are first explored in the episode "Orientation" by an orientation film in the Swan Station. Dr. Pierre Chang (Francois Chau), under the alias of Dr. Marvin Candle, explains that the project began in 1970, created by two doctoral candidates from the University of Michigan, Gerald and Karen DeGroot (Michael Gilday and Courtney Lavigne), and was funded by Alvar Hanso (Ian Patrick Williams) of the Hanso Foundation. They imagined a "large-scale communal research compound", where scientists and free thinkers from around the globe could research meteorology, psychology, parapsychology, zoology, electromagnetism, and a sixth discipline that the film begins to identify as "utopian social-" before being cut off.

The episodes "LaFleur" and "He's Our You" indicate that mathematician Horace Goodspeed was in charge of Dharma Initiative operations on the Island, at least from the very early 1970s through the time of "the Incident". Key decisions that needed to be made on the Island were taken by a committee, which included all department heads, including Head of Research Stuart Radzinsky and security head LaFleur (the name the time-traveling Sawyer was assuming). They, in turn, answer to the Dharma Initiative HQ based at the University of Michigan, as evidenced when Radzinsky threatens to call the University to override a key decision by Goodspeed. In the episode "The Variable", Daniel Faraday confirmed that Dharma Initiative Headquarters, at least through 1977, was located at Ann Arbor, Michigan.

The "Lost Experience", an alternate reality game which took place in 2006, revealed that the objective of the Dharma Initiative was to alter any of the six factors of the Valenzetti Equation, an equation which "predicts the exact number of years and months until humanity extinguishes itself," to allow humans to exist for longer by changing their doomsday. These factors are represented as numbers in the Valenzetti Equation and are also the numbers frequently mentioned in the show: 4, 8, 15, 16, 23 and 42.

In 1977, the Dharma workers based on the Island drilled into a huge electromagnetic pocket, releasing a catastrophically dangerous amount of electromagnetic energy. This is referred to as "the Incident" and is frequently alluded to in other Dharma Initiative sources. Radzinsky insisted on drilling despite warnings from Dr. Chang about the danger. In the Swan Station orientation film, recorded in 1980, Dr. Marvin Candle insists that the computer at the Swan Station not be used for any other purpose, specifically to communicate with other stations. When the Oceanic 815 survivors travel back in time to 1977, they attempt to negate the release of this energy by detonating the plutonium core of a hydrogen bomb, causing a massive explosion that returns all of the time travelers back to 2007.

After the Incident, according to notes on the blast door map painted by Stuart Radzinsky in the Swan Station, the Dharma Initiative's facilities on the Island seemed to fall into disrepair. The blast door map has been annotated about destroyed access tunnels, a breakdown in the Cerberus Security System and mentions facilities being abandoned or destroyed via other incidents or accidents, specifically one happening on October 28, 1984, another in 1985, and a final one on December 7, 1987. By the time Danielle Rousseau and her crew shipwrecked on the Island, in 1988, many of the facilities on the Island had been abandoned, including the radio tower. At no point between then and the eventual purge of its members did the Dharma Initiative attempt a search and rescue for Danielle or her crew, despite Danielle broadcasting her own distress signal on a continuous loop from the tower for sixteen years.

When the Dharma Initiative arrived on the Island, they fought with the Island's natives, known to them as the Hostiles and to the survivors of Flight 815 as the "Others". The "Hostiles" had been living on the Island long before the Initiative arrived. The Arrow Station was eventually given a mission to observe and formulate strategies to counter the Hostiles. When Ben Linus (Michael Emerson) arrived on the Island in 1970, there was still an open conflict between the Hostiles and the Dharma Initiative. At some point prior to 1974, a truce of some kind was brokered with the Hostiles. A series of protocols were put into place between the Hostiles and the Initiative. Several episodes mention that there was a "line" and that certain parts of the Island were considered to be the "territory" of each group. This conflict ended in 1992, when Linus joined the Hostiles, who killed the Initiative, an event which became known as "The Purge". The bodies were buried in a mass grave.

In 2001, after Stuart Radzinsky's alleged suicide in The Swan, Kelvin Inman, a man who found Desmond adrift on the beach, was still working for the Dharma Initiative in the Swan station. Lost producer Carlton Cuse confirms in a podcast that Kelvin was indeed a member of the Dharma Initiative. In the "Lost Experience", an actor portraying fictional Hanso Foundation executive Hugh McIntyre appeared on Jimmy Kimmel Live!, where he stated that the Foundation had stopped funding the Dharma Initiative in 1987. However, in season 2, an air drop of supplies arrived for the Swan station. This drop was made by a drone launched from the Dharma Logistics Warehouse located on the Orote Peninsula on the island of Guam. Two of the last known living members of the Dharma Initiative, known only as Hector and Glenn, had been sending regular supply drops to The Island for over twenty years. This indicates a financial structure had been left in place by the Hanso Foundation, hinted at in the Sri Lanka video, to pay the two workers and keep them supplied with packaged foodstuffs and equipment sufficient to continue sending pallets to The Island in perpetuity. They were regularly given the coordinates of The Island via a teletype link to the still-working Lamp Post station, allowing them to program the drones with the exact drop locations for their cargo. In the epilogue short video "The New Man in Charge", Ben Linus arrives at the warehouse and, after answering Hector and Glenn's questions, shuts it down, correctly telling the Dharma workers that there's a new man in charge (Hurley) and their work is no longer needed (as people are now allowed to leave The Island).

At the 2008 San Diego Comic-Con, a new ARG began with a booth recruiting new members to the Initiative. At the Lost panel, Hans van Eeghen, a Dharma executive, revealed that the results from the booth were "abysmal", and a few people had been selected to view a video that had been sent from thirty years in the past. In the video, Pierre Chang said that the work on the Island is valid, and it is essential that the Dharma Initiative is restarted. Following this a website was launched, which allowed users to join the Dharma Initiative.

== Research stations ==
The mysterious map on the blast door, revealed by blacklight.

The Dharma Initiative built nine known research stations around the Island (as well as the off-island Lamp Post), most of which take the form of hidden underground facilities or bunkers. After Oceanic Flight 815 crashes on the Island in September 2004, the survivors encounter several of these stations. The first to be discovered is "The Swan" which they refer to informally as "the hatch". Nine additional stations have since been visited over the series, each with its own particular logo associated with it: an octagon, similar to the bagua design, with a differing symbol at the center.

On the blast door map, there are 6 structures depicted, and at least 4 of them are labeled by name and icon: the Swan, the Flame, the Staff and the Arrow. The other structures are labeled by question marks or numbers. Two of the alleged stations are drawn with dotted lines. The six structures all surround a big circled question mark in the center of the map. At the top left, there is a seventh structure which is scribbled out. The Swan’s blast door map makes reference to a light manufacturing facility, a meteorological research station, station "CVII", and others that were never shown on the series.

Among the hatches on the southeast side of the map, there are 4 rectangular structures/labels that have "CVI","CVII","CVIII", and "CVIV" written on them. CV stands for Cerberus Vent, which was revealed in secret writing on the back of one of the Lost jigsaw puzzles. The Swan station's blast door map claims that there was, at one time, a tunnel network that connected many of the stations. Notations on the map suggest that the tunnels started falling into disrepair in the early 1980s, soon after the incident occurred.

=== Station 1: The Hydra ===
The Hydra is a zoological research station located on a small island roughly two miles off-shore from the main island. It is described as being about twice the size of Alcatraz Island. The Hydra facility has cages outside the station in the jungle where polar bears used to be kept. An underwater complex was once used as an aquarium, which housed sharks and dolphins. The facility also features living and research quarters. The symbol for this station is the usual Dharma Initiative logo with a hydra in the middle, which can be seen on a large canopy behind Kate and Sawyer’s cages in season 3.

At the start of season 3, Jack, Kate, and Sawyer are held captive on the Hydra island by the Others. Kate and Sawyer are forced to build a runway, until they manage to escape. In season two, a shark has the Dharma symbol branded on its tail. Also in season three episode "A Tale of Two Cities", Tom comments that the polar bears that used to be housed in the cage Sawyer was being held in figured out the "food" puzzle in two hours. A leather collar bearing the Dharma Hydra symbol is found near a polar bear skeleton in the Tunisian desert. In the fifth season, Ajira Airways Flight 316 makes a forced but overall safe landing on the Hydra island, landing on the runway built by the Others. In the fifth-season episode "Some Like It Hoth", Dr. Chang threatens to send an over-inquisitive Hurley to the Hydra to participate in their "ridiculous experiments" if he mentions a body delivered to Dr. Chang by Miles Straume.

=== Station 2: The Arrow ===
The Arrow station is first seen in "...And Found". In "Because You Left", a flashback shows Chang doing the initial recording for the orientation film, where he explains that it is a station for monitoring the Hostiles and formulating strategies to combat them. He is interrupted before he can finish recording. In "The Man Behind the Curtain", flashbacks of the Dharma Initiative in operation on the Island show one of the members, Horace Goodspeed (Doug Hutchison), wearing a jumpsuit bearing the Arrow station logo with "mathematician" written below it. When rediscovered in 2004, the word "quarantine" appears on the inside of the station's door. In "LaFleur", Horace gives the order to notify the Arrow to "prepare the heavy ordnance" when he believes there is an imminent danger from the Hostiles.

When the tail section survivors come across the Arrow in "The Other 48 Days", it has apparently been converted into a storage room. Within, they find a radio, a glass eye, and part of the Swan station's orientation film hidden inside a Bible. Producers Carlton Cuse and Damon Lindelof stated on a podcast that each object is significant, and not randomly chosen.

=== Station 3: The Swan ===
The Swan was planned to be a laboratory used by the Dharma Initiative for research on electromagnetism. In the episode "The Incident", Dharma member Radzinsky claimed that when complete, the Swan would allow manipulation of electromagnetism that "would change the world". According to the feature "Access Granted" on the third season Blu-ray, Dharma drilled into the earth and ruptured a pocket containing a large electromagnetic buildup, which their drilling released. The Swan was built over this area to act as a cork. Dharma came up with a way to "discharge" the leak. A failsafe key could be used to permanently "seal" the leak. The specific event happened in July 1977, as revealed in "The Incident", and necessitated the evacuation of the island.

On the station's orientation film, Dr Marvin Candle explains that an "incident" occurred early in the station's experiments. An edit to the film removed specific details of this incident. This event required the entire Swan station area to be sealed with a large amount of concrete "like Chernobyl" (according to Sayid and Daniel Faraday) to contain the dangerous energy. This caused a consistent build-up of electromagnetic energy, which resulted in a change of the station's use: a two-member crew, replaced every 540 days, were instructed to enter the numbers 4, 8, 15, 16, 23, and 42 into a microcomputer terminal every 108 minutes.

The station is stocked with food, a record player with a collection of old LPs, a library, an armoury, a shower, and bunk beds. It is almost entirely underground, except for an entrance shaft and a concealed door. The station has several internal blast doors, with a map in invisible ink on one of them. This map has been worked on by Kelvin Inman and Radzinsky. Analysis of the map suggests no less than five unique handwriting styles, and at least five different contributors. The map has direct revision dates on it, and also seems to serve as a history to happenings on the island, as there are many annotations that seem to suggest the writers were attempting to locate and ascertain the status of many stations on the Island. There are sections that are written in Latin. There are also acrylic based paints and several murals painted in different portions of the hatch by unknown people as well as tick marks on the wall derived from them.

In the episode "Some Like It Hoth", set in 1977, the Swan is shown to be under construction in an area designated as the Hostile territory; a violation of the truce Dharma had brokered with them, under the primary authority of Radzinsky. In the episode "The Incident", Dharma hits the pocket, releasing the energy and drawing all metallic objects into the hole. The plutonium core of a hydrogen bomb is detonated by the survivors in an attempt to negate the energy. In "Live Together, Die Alone", Desmond Hume (Henry Ian Cusick) shipwrecks on the Island in 2001 and is taken to the Swan station. Here Kelvin Inman explains about entering the numeric code and pushing the button to save the world. In September 2004, Kelvin and Desmond get into a fight, resulting in Kelvin's death. Desmond enters the numbers too late, resulting in an electromagnetic build-up, which causes the crash of Oceanic Flight 815. Two of the survivors, Locke (Terry O'Quinn) and Boone (Ian Somerhalder), accidentally discover the Swan. Locke manages to open the hatch in the first-season finale "Exodus". They find Desmond inside, who flees after they break the computer. The survivors manage to fix the computer, and begin pushing the button every 108 minutes.

After discovering the Pearl orientation film, Locke believes pushing the button is a psychological test, and with Desmond's help decides to find out what will happen if the button is not pushed. Desmond tries to convince Locke that the station is real, with data from the Pearl, but Locke breaks the computer so he can't stop the countdown. This causes all the metal objects in the Swan to fly about, and the ground begins to shake. Realizing the importance of the button, Locke accepts he was wrong, and Desmond turns the failsafe key. The sky turns violet temporarily, and the Swan is destroyed. The electromagnetic burst released by the destruction of the Swan renders the island momentarily visible to the outside world. The energy signature is detected by a monitoring station under the control of Penelope Widmore, which reported to her that they had "found it."

==== The Incident Room ====
In the video game Lost: Via Domus, the Incident Room is the abandoned laboratory revealed to be on the other side of the concrete wall in the Swan. The room was accessed by a tunnel and a large locked door. The room contains a large reactor and other severely damaged equipment. The reactor is tilted to one side and discharging electricity as well as coolant fluid. It has the appearance of two large electromagnetic coils suspended over a drilled shaft into the Island surrounded by severely damaged concrete. The Incident Room has its own computer much like the Swan's. This section of the Swan appeared on the blast door map as a blocked off section of the station ("Lockdown"), but was never seen in the show itself.

The Incident Room has been mentioned several times in the show. When Sayid first visited the Swan he tried to find a way past the concrete wall, but it was too thick to get through. Sayid told Jack that "the last time I heard of concrete being poured over everything in this way was Chernobyl". ("Everybody Hates Hugo").

The look and design for the "Incident Room" came from never before seen blueprints given to the developers by the Lost crew for the game. Although the game has been stated to be non-canon, the designs are the creators' intended layout for the blocked sections of the Swan station.

=== Station 4: The Flame ===
The Flame is the Dharma Initiative's communication station. It uses sonar and satellite technologies to communicate with the outside world and other stations on the Island, and can also be used to order food deliveries. Unlike some of the other stations (the Swan, the Pearl and the Orchid), the Flame is not an underground bunker, but rather a wood-frame bungalow with a large satellite dish on the roof. Inside the station is a living area, a kitchen, and a computer room. Below the building is a large basement containing supplies, including a library of operation manuals. The facility also boasts several gardens, as well as chickens, cows, and goats.

On the day Oceanic Flight 815 crashes on the Island, Mikhail Bakunin (Andrew Divoff) uses the station to access news feeds to gather information about the survivors. At Ben's request he alters one of the feeds to allow Juliet to see her sister and nephew alive off the Island. At some point after this, communication off the Island is no longer possible, as the Looking Glass is blocking all signals. In "Enter 77", Kate Austen (Evangeline Lilly), Sayid Jarrah (Naveen Andrews), and Locke discover the station. Locke uses the computer to send a message saying the Hostiles have invaded the station, and by doing so he unintentionally destroys it by causing the C4 in the basement to explode. As shown in "LaFleur", Radzinsky was stationed at the Flame in 1977, where he designed the model for the future Swan station.

=== Station 5: The Pearl ===
The Pearl is where the Dharma Initiative studied psychology. It primarily serves as a monitoring station, to which surveillance feeds from the other stations are sent. Its orientation film asserts that the Swan is a psychological experiment, and that the purpose of those stationed in the Pearl is to monitor the participants in that station. The station consists of a three-by-three bank of television sets, two chairs with writing surfaces, and a computer hooked to a printer. A pneumatic tube is installed in the room, which the orientation film states is used to transport notebooks to another Dharma location. According to the orientation film that features Dr Mark Whickman, two-person teams, working eight-hour shifts over a three-week period, were to watch the video displays and take notes on their observations. Every action, regardless of how trivial, was to be recorded into notebooks by the Pearl's team members.

After Oceanic Flight 815 crashes on the Island, Nikki and Paulo (Kiele Sanchez and Rodrigo Santoro) are the first survivors to encounter the Pearl, while searching for diamonds. Several weeks later, Locke and Mr. Eko (Adewale Akinnuoye-Agbaje) enter the Pearl and watch the orientation video. Locke believes this means pushing the button in the Swan is a psychological test, and resolves to discover what will happen if it is not pushed. However, Desmond postulates in "Live Together, Die Alone" that the Pearl participants were the true test subjects without knowing it. This is supported when the survivors discover that the pneumatic tube dumps the notebooks into an open field; the contents of the notebooks indicate that they had been dumped there long before the station closed. During season three, some of the survivors visit the Pearl in hope of finding a way to communicate with the Others, but discover that the station is only capable of receiving data, not sending them.

=== Station 6: The Orchid ===
Introduced in the three-part finale of the fourth season, "There's No Place Like Home", the Orchid station appears at first to be an abandoned greenhouse. Hidden below the greenhouse is a second level of the station, a furnished laboratory similar to the Swan station. The Orchid features a small chamber adjacent to an exotic matter anomaly, which can be used to warp time and space. An outtake from the orientation film was shown at the 2007 San Diego Comic-Con, where Doctor Edgar Halliwax explains that, contrary to Dharma's statements that the station was for botanical research, the station is used for researching a "Casimir effect" exhibited by the Island. The producers have confirmed that the video is canon, and holds relevance to the show itself.

Below the Orchid station is a room which consists of pillars and stones with unknown hieroglyphs that have been seen in a few other places on the Island, and ends with a room consisting of a giant frozen wheel built horizontally into the wall. As shown in "This Place is Death", the chamber was in place well before the construction of the Orchid. A well was connected to it at one point before the Orchid was built, but the chamber itself predates it. Despite being under the Orchid, it has nothing to do with the DHARMA Initiative, nor did any member of DHARMA ever set foot in the room or use the wheel. Ben and Locke enter the station and Ben travels to this room, where he turns the wheel. As he moves it the Island vanishes. Ben is transported to the Tunisian desert as a consequence of using it. As a result of turning the wheel, the survivors of Flight 815 and the freighter crew members on the Island (who are all candidates to replace Jacob) begin to jump randomly through time. When Locke returns to the wheel in "This Place is Death", it is shown to be behaving erratically and still glowing. Locke turns the wheel back to the original position, transporting himself off the Island to the same place Ben ended up. The time jumps also stop, stranding the survivors in 1974. Charles Widmore would later tell Locke that the Tunisian desert is the "exit point" for anyone who uses the wheel.

In a flashback in "Because You Left", Dr. Chang is called to investigate an incident at the Orchid. A construction worker is shown bleeding from his eyes and mouth, and six drill bits have been melted drilling into the future site of the chamber. Scans of the wall reveal the presence of the chamber with the wheel behind it. Chang refuses to use explosives to clear the wall, since it might release a limitless energy source. He believes that they will be able to control time if the energy can be harnessed properly.

The origin of the well and the wheel are explained in the later episode "Across the Sea".

=== Station 9: The Tempest ===
The Tempest is a chemical weapons development station on the Island, first seen in the episode "The Other Woman". It is used to control the release of poisonous gases over the Island. In "The Other Woman", it was revealed that part of Daniel Faraday's and Charlotte Lewis' primary missions were to disable the gases at the station. They said they needed to press the button to save everyone, although they may have wanted to disable the station's gases to prevent Benjamin Linus from using the Tempest as a weapon of last resort against the Island's enemies.

=== Station ?: The Staff ===
The Staff is a medical research station, later designed to house pregnant women who were taken there to give birth and/or die. It consists of a long corridor, at the end of which is an operating room, as well as a nursery and a locker room. Hidden inside one of the lockers is a switch that unlocks a hidden vault that contains medical equipment and nursery furniture. There is also another hidden room, where the Others take women who have become pregnant on the Island to die.

After Claire Littleton (Emilie de Ravin) is kidnapped by the Others in season one, she is taken to the Staff station. Here she has a drug administered to her fetus. A renegade Other, Alex (Tania Raymonde), helps Claire to escape when she learns that they are planning to steal Claire's baby. When it is found by Claire and Kate later on, Kate discovers costumes, a fake beard, and some theatrical glue in the Staff locker room. In season three, Sun-Hwa Kwon (Yunjin Kim) and Juliet Burke (Elizabeth Mitchell) visit the Staff station to perform an ultrasound to discover when Sun's baby was conceived. In season four, Faraday, Charlotte, Jin and Sun visit the station to get some medical supplies for Jack's operation. This station is also where people come when they get "sick".

=== Station ?: The Looking Glass ===
The Looking Glass is located on the seabed at approximately 60 feet (18m) depth and 600 feet (182m) from the beach. The station is used to block communications going to and from the Island as well as generating a beacon to guide the submarine to the Island. When the DHARMA Initiative was still active the Looking Glass was also used to resupply the submarine. The station's logo is a rabbit; a reference to the White Rabbit from Alice in Wonderland (the sequel to which is Through the Looking-Glass). The logo can be seen in the episode "Greatest Hits" when Charlie swims down to it. The Others were under the impression that the station was flooded. Only Ben knew that the station was still in operation and there were people working there.

In the season 3 finale "Through the Looking Glass" Charlie discovers that the rescue boat linked to Naomi (the parachutist) was not sent out by Desmond’s ex-girlfriend Penny Widmore. Charlie locks the door to the control room when Mikhail shatters the porthole window subsequently flooding the room. This prevents Desmond from getting to Charlie and fulfills Desmond's latest vision (Charlie was meant to drown in the control room after disabling the jamming equipment). He quickly writes "NOT PENNYS BOAT" on his hand and shows the warning to Desmond through the glass on the door before drowning.

=== Station ?: The Lamp Post ===
The Lamp Post is the only known off-island Dharma station. It is located in Los Angeles under a church, built on top of a pocket of electromagnetic energy similar to that on the island. This station was used by the DHARMA Initiative to find the Island. As the island can move and is hard to locate, the researchers developed an equation to predict where the island would be in the future, thereby providing a window of opportunity to reach it. A large pendulum (resembling a Foucault pendulum) hangs from the ceiling making chalk marks on a map on the floor beneath, making a pattern with lines crossing a central point from almost every direction except up and down. Many computers surround the pendulum, along with a panel on the wall that marks latitude and longitude. The inside of the station first appears in the second episode of season five, "The Lie", though no explanation of its purpose (or that it is, in fact, a DHARMA station) is revealed until the following episode, "316". The computers also seem to be able to find data regarding the Island, for example how long the people who left the Island have to return before an unspecified catastrophe occurs (70 hours). It is unknown how these data are calculated or received. Eloise Hawking is currently in charge of the station, and uses it to help the Oceanic 6 return to the island with the assistance of Ben Linus.

The station's logo includes the traditional Dharma octagon-shape with a picture of what appears to be a lamp post (a lamp post marks the entrance to the magical world of Narnia in the novel The Lion, the Witch and the Wardrobe by C. S. Lewis) emitting light to either side. This picture can also refer to the pendulum within the station as evidenced by the pointed tip in the picture.

== Mysteries of the Universe ==
Starting on July 23, 2009, ABC's official Lost website started posting a five-part documentary from lost footage from a short-lived 1980s television series "Mysteries of the Universe". The brand and its episodes were created by ABC and the Lost team in 2009 as a promotion for the final season of the show. A documentary series with a similar name was made in the 1980s, which may provide documentary with an appearance of being factual – although the presentation contains humor. The videos contain new revelations about the DHARMA Initiative and the conspiracies that surround it.

== Appearances in Lost ==
Station	First seen in	First visit (onscreen)	Last seen in	Name given in
Station 1: The Hydra	"A Tale of Two Cities" (3.01)	"A Tale of Two Cities" (3.01)	"The New Man in Charge" (Epilogue)	"A Tale of Two Cities" (3.01)
Station 2: The Arrow	"Everybody Hates Hugo" (2.04)	"The Other 48 Days" (2.07)	"The Other 48 Days" (2.07)	"Lockdown" (2.17)
Station 3: The Swan	"All the Best Cowboys Have Daddy Issues" (1.11)	"Man of Science, Man of Faith" (2.01)	"LA X" (6.01 & 6.02)	"Orientation" (2.03)
Station 4: The Flame	"The Cost of Living" (3.05)	"Enter 77" (3.11)	"Namaste" (5.09)	"Lockdown" (2.17)
Station 5: The Pearl	"?" (2.21)	"?" (2.21)	"Exposé" (3.14)	"?" (2.21)
Station 6: The Orchid	Comic Con orientation film and "There's No Place Like Home" (4.14)	"There's No Place Like Home" (4.14)	"The Variable" (5.14)	Comic Con orientation film
Station 9: The Tempest	"The Other Woman" (4.06)	"The Other Woman" (4.06)	"The Other Woman" (4.06)	"The Other Woman" (4.06)
Station ?: The Staff	"Maternity Leave" (2.15)	"Maternity Leave" (2.15)	"Something Nice Back Home" (4.10)	"Lockdown" (2.17)
Station ?: The Looking Glass	"Greatest Hits" (3.21)	"Greatest Hits" (3.21)	"Through the Looking Glass" (3.22)	"Greatest Hits" (3.21)
Station ?: The Lamp Post	"The Lie" (5.02)	"316" (5.06)	"316" (5.06)	"316" (5.06)

== Hanso Foundation ==
The Hanso Foundation, founded by Danish arms dealer Alvar Hanso, is depicted as the major benefactor of the Dharma Initiative. Nearly all information about the Foundation is drawn from its website, thehansofoundation.org, with further background revealed as part of the alternate reality game, the Lost Experience.

During the Lost Experience, documents and other information were released to suggest that the management of the Foundation was scandalous and, in some cases, criminal. For example, some executives were revealed to have falsely reported the extent of their education in their biographies. One executive was caught in an extramarital affair. Others defended tobacco companies, nuclear power plants and an oil company that dumped chemical waste in Florida. Another executive was sentenced to eight years for insider trading which he subsidized through a retirement fund for a health care union.

== In popular culture ==
A Dharma-related Easter Egg in Half-Life 2: Episode Two.

A Dharma logo in Cloverfield.

In Half-Life 2: Episode Two, players can find an Easter egg in the sixth chapter, "Our Mutual Fiend". In another twist which connects the two media, Our Mutual Friend is a book that Desmond was saving to read just before his suicide in the Swan station on Lost. In Uriah's lab, there is an inaccessible room containing a computer terminal with the numbers shown on the screen and a Dharma-style octagon with a pine tree symbol for the White Forest base on the wall. This easter egg was added at the request of Gabe Newell, who promised to insert a reference to Lost in response to Half-Life references in Lost's first season episode "The Greater Good".

In 2009, The Fringemunks released a song called "DHARMA Initiative" (a parody of Culture Club's "Karma Chameleon").

In the 30 Rock episode, "The Beginning of the End", which is also the name of a Lost episode, Kenneth Parcell has Dharma Initiative Ice Cream, calling it Government Ice Cream.

The character of Joculine in Psycholonials has a Dharma Initiative tattoo on her shoulder.
