= Miles Straume =

Character from the American mystery fiction television series Lost

- Lost character
- Ken Leung as Miles Straume
- First appearance: "Confirmed Dead"
- Last appearance: "The End"
- Created by: J. J. Abrams; Damon Lindelof
- Portrayed by: Ken Leung
- Centric episode(s): "Confirmed Dead" "Some Like It Hoth"

In-universe information
- Full name: Miles Straume
- Species: Human
- Gender: Male
- Occupation: Medium; Dharma security officer
- Family: Pierre Chang (father)
- Nationality: American
- Former residence: Encino, Los Angeles, California, United States

Miles Straume is a fictional character played by Ken Leung on the ABC television series Lost. He made his first appearance in the season four episode "Confirmed Dead" and his last in the series finale. Miles is depicted as a hotheaded and sarcastic medium as a crew member aboard the Kahana, a freighter offshore the main island. After arriving on the main island he becomes an ally of the survivors of Oceanic Airlines Flight 815 and aids their efforts to escape the island.

The writers created the role of Miles specifically for Leung after seeing him guest star on The Sopranos. Leung was the only actor to read for the part. They chose his name because it resembles "maelstrom", another word for a powerful whirlpool. Reaction to the character was positive.

== Fictional biography ==
Miles was born in March 1977. As a child, he lives with his mother Lara Chang (Leslie Ishii) in Encino, California. Miles resents his father for never having been around and also has disdain for other fathers who mistreat their children. During his childhood, Miles discovered that he could hear the thoughts of the deceased. He uses his ability to become a professional spiritualist.

=== Season 4 ===
In early December 2004, when he is twenty-seven years old, Miles is hired by Charles Widmore to go on a freighter called the Kahana to an uncharted island to retrieve a mass murderer named Ben Linus. Widmore believes that Miles will be able to communicate with those whom he had killed and gain information regarding Ben's location.

Miles is flown via helicopter from the freighter to the island on December 21 as part of a science team. The next day on the island, Miles encounters the survivors of the September 22 Oceanic Airlines Flight 815, who are believed to be dead by the world at large. Hostile and distrustful of the survivors for killing his colleague Naomi Dorrit (Marsha Thomason), Miles is taken prisoner by 815 survivor John Locke (Terry O'Quinn) and kept in a boathouse near a Barracks on the island. The next day, Miles temporarily escapes and bargains with Ben, who has also been taken prisoner: Miles will tell Widmore that Ben is dead in exchange for $3.2 million, double what Widmore was paying him. The Barracks are ransacked on December 27 by a mercenary team from the freighter, who murder six people. Miles leaves with Sawyer, Claire and Aaron for their beach camp. On the way, Miles stumbles upon the dead bodies of Karl and Danielle Rosseau. Later that night Claire disappears into the jungle and Sawyer initially blames Miles. Miles arrives on December 30, shortly before eight are rescued not far from the island, the freighter explodes and the mercenary team is killed by the Others, the island's indigenous people under Ben's leadership. Also that day, Ben moves the island through spacetime by turning a large frozen donkey wheel underground.

=== Season 5 ===
The group on the beach begin flashing through time, landing in fourteen different times throughout the Island's past and future in the span of about a week before the wheel is turned again; however, according to fellow freighter science team member physicist Daniel Faraday (Jeremy Davies), none of the past is changed because their suddenly appearing in various times is what had always happened. The survivors settle in 1974, by which point only Miles, Faraday, former Other Juliet Burke (Elizabeth Mitchell) and 815 passengers James "Sawyer" Ford (Josh Holloway) and Jin Kwon (Daniel Dae Kim) remain; Rose Henderson (L. Scott Caldwell), Bernard Nadler (Sam Anderson) and Vincent the dog (Pono) also survive, but they are physically separated and do not meet any of them again for three years until July 1977. Miles and his group move into the Barracks and pseudonymously join the DHARMA Initiative, an organization conducting scientific research while living there that would eventually be purged in 1992 by Ben and the Others. Despite the option to board the DHARMA submarine and "go back to the real world", the survivors from 2004 stay on the island together in the hope that they can somehow return to the time that they knew. Miles becomes a security officer and ends up becoming friends with Sawyer. He discovers that his mother and father Dr. Pierre Chang live on the island as part of DHARMA and his father is even the man in the organization's station-specific orientation films; however, Miles does not approach or befriend his father, continuing to harbor resentment for his absence from much of Miles's life.

In July 1977, both thirty-year-old security officer Miles and three-month-old infant Miles are living on the island. Four survivors, Jack, Kate, Hurley, and Sayid from Flight 815 who had been rescued nearly three years earlier on December 30, 2004, arrive on the island in 1977 after flying near the island in late 2007 and also join DHARMA, Sayid being a prisoner on suspicion of being an Other. Miles still stays distant from his father, but, after talking to Hurley during a late-night chore, witnesses a peaceful moment between his younger self and his father. Three days later, the groups from the future are exposed as liars. The next morning, Faraday comes clean to Chang that they are from the future and warns of a catastrophic "incident" that is due to occur at the building site for the Swan, DHARMA's planned island station dedicated to electromagnetism. He instructs Chang to evacuate the island of non-essential personnel, which he does, ordering his wife and baby Miles to leave him, shortly after finding out that adult Miles is his son and confronting him about it. Here, Miles realizes that he himself caused his father to order his mother and his three-month-old self to leave. Faraday theorizes that if "Jughead" – a hydrogen bomb that is buried on the island – is detonated at the Swan site by the underground electromagnetic pocket of energy, the timeline will be altered, preventing any of the group from the future from ever having come to the island in 2004, saving everyone who had died after they arrived. The plan proceeds as planned, even though Miles expresses skepticism. The antagonistic DHARMA members engage in a gunfight with Jack, believing him to be an Other, and Miles, Sawyer, Juliet, and Kate come to his aid. When the Swan site goes haywire, Chang's arm is caught in the debris and Miles rushes to his side, saving him and calling him "Dad". After he tells his father to run as far as possible from the site, the bomb is detonated and everything goes to white, leaving Miles's status uncertain.

=== Season 6 ===
In the first episode of Season 6, Miles is revealed to have been returned to the future along with the other survivors. When Kate, Jack, Hurley and Jin go to the temple to save Sayid, Sawyer asks Miles to remain behind to help bury the now-deceased Juliet and to use his power to find out what she was trying to tell him before she died. He reluctantly agrees, and after a few seconds, tells Sawyer "it worked."

He and Sawyer are captured shortly after by the Others and taken to the Temple, where he stays with Hurley, Jack, and Sayid, while Kate, Jin, and Sawyer escape. A few days later, after Jack and Hurley too escape, Miles is left behind with the "infected" Sayid and the Others when Claire Littleton, also "infected", shows up to talk to the Others' spokesperson, Dogen (Hiroyuki Sanada). Kate meanwhile returns, hoping to find Claire. Miles tells her Claire is held hostage. Later that night, the Smoke Monster ravages the Temple, killing anyone in its path. Miles and Kate flee but get separated; Miles shuts himself in a room, until Ilana, Frank Lapidus, Sun-Hwa Kwon, and Ben burst in to help him. They go through a secret passageway safely just as the Smoke Monster enters the room.

Miles uses his gift to discover how Jacob died, and reveals to Ilana that Ben killed him. They take shelter at the Oceanic Flight 815 survivors' beach camp. When confronting Ben later, Miles refuses the offered $3.2 million in exchange for freeing Ben from Ilana. Ben is spared, however, and Miles then digs up Nikki and Paulo's diamonds where they had been buried with them to compensate for his lack of money on the Island.

When Hurley, Jack, and Richard join their group, Miles is particularly happy to greet Hurley. A few days later, Richard decides their mission is to stop the Man in Black from escaping; they are to destroy the Ajira Airways Flight 316 on the other Island, dubbed "Hydra Island", so that the Man in Black stays trapped in the area. However, Hurley destroys the remaining dynamite from an old ship shipwrecked on the Island, thinking it will save everyone. The disagreement between Richard and Hurley splits the group into two: Hurley's party will go talk to the Man in Black, while Richard's party will search for more explosives. Miles decides to follow Richard and Ben, telling Hurley that he has seen "that thing in action," and that it doesn't want to talk.

Miles, Richard, and Ben go back to the barracks to get some C4 that Ben secretly kept in his closet behind the bookcase. When they get there Miles hears the screams of Ben's daughter Alex, buried there. They get the C4 but when they come out they are confronted by Widmore and his geologist Zoe. Widmore says he needs a hiding place because the monster was coming. Ben reluctantly says he can hide in his secret room. When The Man in Black comes Richard says he can talk to it, claiming all he wants is for Richard to join him. Ben goes with him but Miles; saying he is sticking to surviving, decides to leave them and run back into the jungle.

He then finds Richard Alpert in the jungle and calls Ben on a walkie talkie that he gave him. When Richard gets up he says to Miles that they need to get back to Hydra Island and destroy the plane with the C4 that they still have; saying they have to finish what they started.

Miles and Richard get to the boat they left at the dock. As they are undocking the boat he reveals to Richard that he is starting to age. When they are rowing to Hydra Island they spot Frank Lapidus drifting in the water in life vests. When they get him on the boat Frank proposes they leave the island on the plane before the Man in Black comes. Richard and Miles agree. Miles then radios Ben again, saying they have made it to Hydra Island and about his plan about the plane. As he is talking, Claire comes out from the bushes and fires two warning shots to tell them not to come closer. Richard manages to calm her down but she refuses to go on the plane with them. Miles radios a third time. Kate picks up. He says to her they are patching up the plane and getting ready to take off. He tells Kate about Claire not wanting to come with them. Kate then smashes the radio she has. Miles asks Frank how the plane was doing. Frank says he has to check the electrical outlet before they take off. Miles and Richard repair the hydraulics with duct tape, then rejoin Frank in the cockpit.

With Richard and Miles in the cockpit Frank tries a third time to turn the plane on, and this time succeeds. Miles heads to the back to watch out for Sawyer and the others who want to come. Miles announces they are clear for takeoff, and closes the door. Frank then tells Richard and Miles to open the door back up again when he sees Kate and Sawyer. Miles opens the door and lets in Kate, Sawyer and Claire. After that Miles sits in the back with the others. Miles and the others smile at the sight of the island getting smaller and smaller in the distance.

=== Afterlife ===
Oceanic Flight 815 does not crash on the Island, resulting in a different background for Miles. Instead of a professional medium, he is an officer of the LAPD alongside James Ford. A comment by Miles indicates that his father is still alive in this reality, working at a museum with Charlotte, who Miles sets up on a blind date with Ford. Although working well with James, Miles feels he lacks trust from him. He later gains access to James' credit card account and learns his partner did not go to Palm Springs like he said, instead going to Australia. Angrily demanding answers, Miles makes James eventually informing him of Anthony Cooper's con. Miles objects to James' intention to kill Cooper, until a car crashes into theirs. The two cops pursue the hit-and-run driver, who is revealed to be Kate.

After receiving a surveillance tape showing Sayid Jarrah leaving the scene of a crime, Miles informs James of this and together they go to the home of Sayid's sister-in-law, Nadia. While Miles blocks the front door, James catches Sayid and arrests him at the back.

== Personality ==
Miles is hotheaded and initially hostile toward the survivors, after one of them kills his colleague Naomi Dorrit (Marsha Thomason). But he, too, is disrespectful of Naomi after she dies, telling Kate, "Sure I'm affected [by Naomi's death]. She was hot and I dug her accent." Upon learning that Miles has been captured by Locke, Frank informs Sayid that "that guy's nothing but a pain in my ass."

Miles sarcastically nicknames his acquaintances, prompting critics, fans and characters to compare him to the character Sawyer and give him a nickname of his own: "mini-Sawyer". Ken Leung claims that he is often approached by people who like the character and he assumes that it is because of Miles's "sardonic wit" and "devil-may-care sort of attitude." Leung surmised that "Usually when people are like that, just … kind of throwing off quick [and] quirky remarks … they're hiding something, so he's definitely hiding something." Asked if Miles is much like him, Leung responded with "I don't think I'm that similar. Um, I don't know—I guess I have moments." Leung said that "Miles doesn't know how to be social, which is great, because I don't know how to be social." He has also stated that Miles "trust[s] the dead more than the living" and is intrigued as to whom Miles grieves for. Leung stated that "He seems haunted by something, that—that's for sure … one of the first thoughts I had [was that his] communication with the dead … can't be a great thing … it's not a happy skill to have."

Both Miles and Hurley can speak to the dead—a similarity noted by Hurley; however, their manners of communication vary. While Miles is able to access a person's mind as it was before death, Hurley physically interacts with apparitions of the deceased. Executive producer/writer Edward Kitsis has commented that "they both have unique abilities, and that very question of how they differ may be explored by the end of the series."

== Development ==
The day after the April 22, 2007 episode of The Sopranos titled "Remember When" aired, Lost's co-creator Damon Lindelof met with fellow executive producer/writer/show runner Carlton Cuse and said that "there's an actor on th[e] show [last night]—I'm not going to tell you who he is—and I wonder if he has the same impression on you that he had on me". Cuse correctly guessed Ken Leung, who had guest starred as one-time character Carter Chong, a young and angry mental patient. In mid-May, they contacted Leung's agent and were informed in July that he was available and interested in working on Lost. To limit the leak of spoilers, Lindelof and Cuse auditioned Leung with a character and scene created specifically for the audition that would not be used in the show but was "analogous to the role [that they] really want[ed]." Leung believed that he was auditioning for the role of Russell, a "brilliant mathematician" in his late thirties with immense knowledge across various scientific fields, limited social skills and broken personal relationships. Leung was the only actor who tried out for this part, as writers had written the role of Miles for him; had he not accepted the job, the character would have been completely rewritten. The name Miles Straume was simply chosen because the writers thought that "it would be cool if his name sounded like 'maelstrom' ".

Leung relocated from New York to where the show is filmed in Oahu, Hawaii, which Leung described as "so dreamy". He was initially contracted as a guest star with "potential regular status in [the] future", which came to fruition. At first, Leung struggled with the show's secrecy, not knowing much about his character's background or motivations, but he found some understanding with his character's clothing. Costume designer Roland Sanchez based Miles's wardrobe choice after that of The Rolling Stones member Keith Richards; specifically a picture in which he wore a sleeveless vest. Sanchez believed that Miles fit the haggard look and bought an Armani Exchange jacket, cropped the sleeves and added a hood.

The writers planned for the ninth or tenth episode of the fourth season to focus on Miles's backstory; however, this was pushed back to the thirteenth episode of the fifth season as a result of the Writers Guild of America strike. The revelation that Miles is Chang's son was not confirmed until Miles's flashback episode; however, this plot point had been speculated by the Internet fan community as early as Miles's first appearance on the show. Further speculation occurred following the broadcast of the fifth-season premiere, in which Chang was seen tending to a baby boy. This influenced the way that it was revealed in the show, as the writers looked for a way to present the information in a way that would both be interesting to those who had not guessed it and not insulting to viewers who had been predicting it. What resulted was Miles and Hurley discussing Chang with Miles plainly saying, "That douche is my dad" before a cut to a commercial break.

== Reception ==
After four appearances, Leung was nominated for the J. C. Penney Asian Excellence Award in the Supporting Television Actor category, but he lost to Rex Lee, who plays Lloyd on HBO's Entourage. According to Jon Lachonis of UGO, Miles and the other new characters have been well received by fans. Maureen Ryan of The Chicago Tribune said that Leung is "terrifically intense" in his portrayal. Paige Albiniak of the New York Post praised the cast addition. Diane Werts of Newsday thought that "Ken Leung and Michael Emerson may be the two current most interesting actors in this mix". Alan Sepinwall of The Star-Ledger commented that "Miles the dustbusting ghostbuster is easily my favorite [of the characters introduced in 'Confirmed Dead'] … why not throw in a medium [among the show's science fiction phemonena] … I love the sarcastic energy he brings. Sawyer and Ben can't be the only ones getting the good one-liners". After Miles' introduction in the second episode of the fourth season, Jeff Jensen of Entertainment Weekly wrote that Leung made "a strong impression" and was well cast. Chris Carabott of IGN stated that "Leung does an adequate job of getting Miles' arrogant brand of confidence across."
