= List of Lost characters =

The characters from the America drama television series Lost were created by Damon Lindelof and J. J. Abrams. The series follows the lives of plane crash survivors on a mysterious tropical island, after a commercial passenger jet from the fictional Oceanic Airlines crashes somewhere in the South Pacific. Each episode typically features a primary storyline on the island as well as a secondary storyline, a flashback from another point in a character's life.

Out of the 324 people on board Oceanic Flight 815, there are 71 initial survivors (70 humans and one dog) spread across the three sections of the plane crash.

Partial cast of Lost, from left to right: Daniel, Boone, Miles, Michael, Ana Lucia, Charlotte, Frank, Shannon, Desmond, Eko, Kate, Jack, Sawyer, Locke, Ben, Sayid, Libby, Sun, Jin, Claire, Hurley, Juliet, Charlie, Richard, Bernard, Rose and Vincent

== Casting and development ==
Many of the first season roles were a result of the executive producers' liking of various actors. The main character Jack was originally going to die in the pilot, and was hoped to be played by Michael Keaton; however, ABC executives were adamant that Jack live. Before it was decided that Jack would live, Kate was to emerge as the leader of the survivors; she was originally conceived to be more like the character of Rose. Dominic Monaghan auditioned for the role of Sawyer, who at the time was supposed to be a suit-wearing city con man. The producers enjoyed Monaghan's performance and changed the character of Charlie, originally a middle-aged former rock star, to fit him. Jorge Garcia also auditioned for Sawyer, and the part of Hurley was written for him. When Josh Holloway auditioned for Sawyer, the producers liked the edge he brought to the character (he reportedly kicked a chair when he forgot his lines and got angry in the audition) and his southern accent, so they changed Sawyer to fit Holloway's acting. Yunjin Kim auditioned for Kate, but the producers wrote the character of Sun for her and the character of Jin, portrayed by Daniel Dae Kim, to be her husband. Sayid, played by Naveen Andrews, was also not in the original script. Locke and Michael were written with their actors in mind. Emilie de Ravin, who plays Claire, was originally cast in what was supposed to be a recurring role. Kimberley Joseph's character, an unnamed flight attendant, was originally scripted to be killed off in the pilot, but was brought back in Season 2 with the name Cindy and continued to make guest appearances through to the final season, becoming one of the last handful of Flight 815 survivors.

== Cast ==
=== Main cast ===
Actor	Character	Seasons					
Actor	Character	1	2	3	4	5	6
Naveen Andrews	Sayid Jarrah	Main	Main	Main	Main	Main	Main
Emilie de Ravin	Claire Littleton	Main	Main	Main	Main	Stand-in	Main
Matthew Fox	Jack Shephard	Main	Main	Main	Main	Main	Main
Jorge Garcia	Hugo "Hurley" Reyes	Main	Main	Main	Main	Main	Main
Maggie Grace	Shannon Rutherford	Main	Main	Special Guest			Main (Note: The actor was credited along with the main cast members in the series finale.)
Josh Holloway	James "Sawyer" Ford	Main	Main	Main	Main	Main	Main
Malcolm David Kelley	Walt Lloyd	Main	Main	Special Guest	Special Guest	Special Guest	
Daniel Dae Kim	Jin-Soo Kwon	Main	Main	Main	Main	Main	Main
Yunjin Kim	Sun-Hwa Kwon	Main	Main	Main	Main	Main	Main
Evangeline Lilly	Kate Austen	Main	Main	Main	Main	Main	Main
Dominic Monaghan (Note: Jeremy Shada also portrays a younger version of the character in seasons 2 and 3.)	Charlie Pace	Main (Note: Credited as a regular up to the first episode of the fourth season.)	Main	Main	Main		Main
Terry O'Quinn	John Locke / Man in Black	Main	Main	Main	Main	Main	Main
Harold Perrineau	Michael Dawson	Main	Main		Main		Guest
Ian Somerhalder	Boone Carlyle	Main	Special Guest	Special Guest			Main
Michelle Rodriguez	Ana Lucia Cortez	Guest	Main			Special Guest	Special Guest
Adewale Akinnuoye-Agbaje (Note: Kolawolfe Obileye Jr. also portrays a younger version of the character in seasons 2 and 3.)	Mr. Eko		Main	Main			
Cynthia Watros	Elizabeth "Libby" Smith		Main		Guest		Main
Henry Ian Cusick	Desmond Hume		Recurring	Main	Main	Main	Main
Michael Emerson (Note: Sterling Beaumon also portrays a younger version of the character in seasons 3 and 5.)	Benjamin Linus		Recurring	Main	Main	Main	Main
Elizabeth Mitchell	Juliet Burke			Main	Main	Main	Main
Kiele Sanchez	Nikki Fernandez			Main			
Rodrigo Santoro	Paulo			Main			
Jeremy Davies	Daniel Faraday				Main	Main	Main
Ken Leung	Miles Straume				Main	Main	Main
Rebecca Mader (Note: Maya Henssens also portrays a younger version of the character in season 5.)	Charlotte Lewis				Main	Main	Main
Néstor Carbonell	Richard Alpert			Recurring	Recurring	Recurring	Main
Jeff Fahey	Frank Lapidus				Recurring	Recurring	Main
Zuleikha Robinson	Ilana Verdansky					Recurring	Main
Sam Anderson	Bernard Nadler		Recurring	Guest	Recurring	Recurring	Main
L. Scott Caldwell	Rose Nadler	Recurring	Recurring	Guest	Recurring	Recurring	Main
François Chau	Pierre Chang		Guest	Guest	Guest	Recurring	Main
Fionnula Flanagan (Note: Alexandra Krosney and Alice Evans also portray younger versions of the character in season 5.)	Eloise Hawking			Guest		Recurring	Main
John Terry	Christian Shephard / Man in Black	Recurring	Guest	Guest	Recurring	Recurring	Main
Sonya Walger	Penny Widmore		Guest	Guest	Guest	Recurring	Main

=== Recurring cast ===
Actor	Character	Seasons					
Actor	Character	1	2	3	4	5	6
William Blanchette	Aaron Littleton	Recurring	Recurring	Recurring	Recurring	Recurring	Recurring
Julie Bowen	Sarah Shephard	Guest	Recurring	Recurring			
Beth Broderick	Diane Janssen	Guest	Recurring	Guest	Guest		
Byron Chung	Woo-Jung Paik	Guest		Recurring	Guest		
Mira Furlan (Note: Melissa Farman also portrays a younger version of the character in season 5.)	Danielle Rousseau	Recurring	Recurring	Recurring	Recurring	Recurring	Guest
Andrea Gabriel	Nadia Jazeem	Guest	Guest	Guest	Recurring	Guest	Recurring
M. C. Gainey	Tom Friendly	Guest	Recurring	Recurring	Recurring		
Neil Hopkins (Note: Zack Shada also portrays a younger version of the character in seasons 2 and 3.)	Liam Pace	Guest	Guest	Guest			Recurring
Kimberley Joseph	Cindy Chandler	Recurring	Recurring	Recurring			Recurring
Fredric Lehne	Edward Mars	Recurring	Guest	Guest			Guest
William Mapother	Ethan Rom	Recurring	Guest	Recurring		Guest	Guest
Kevin Tighe	Anthony Cooper	Guest	Recurring	Recurring			Guest
Michael Bowen	Danny Pickett		Recurring	Recurring			
Clancy Brown	Kelvin Inman		Recurring				
Brett Cullen	Goodwin Stanhope		Recurring	Recurring	Guest		
Alan Dale (Note: Tom Connolly and David S. Lee also portray younger versions of the character in season 5.)	Charles Widmore		Guest	Guest	Recurring	Recurring	Recurring
Kim Dickens	Cassidy Phillips		Guest	Recurring		Guest	
April Grace	Bea Klugh		Recurring	Guest			
Mickey Graue	Zach		Guest	Recurring			Recurring
Kiersten Havelock	Emma		Guest	Recurring			Recurring
Tony Lee	Jae Lee		Recurring	Guest			
Adetokumboh M'Cormack (Note: Olekan Obileye also portrays a younger version of the character in season 2 and 3.)	Yemi		Recurring	Guest			
Tania Raymonde	Alex Rousseau		Recurring	Recurring	Recurring	Guest	Recurring
Katey Sagal	Helen Norwood		Recurring				Recurring
Teddy Wells	Ivan		Recurring	Recurring			
Blake Bashoff	Karl Martin			Recurring	Recurring		
Andrew Divoff	Mikhail Bakunin			Recurring			Guest
Brian Goodman	Ryan Pryce			Recurring			
Jon Gries	Roger Linus			Guest		Recurring	Guest
Doug Hutchison	Horace Goodspeed			Guest	Guest	Recurring	
Paula Malcolmson	Colleen Pickett			Recurring			
Tracy Middendorf	Bonnie			Recurring			
Lana Parrilla	Greta			Recurring			
Marsha Thomason	Naomi Dorrit			Recurring	Recurring	Guest	
Robin Weigert	Rachel Carlson			Recurring			
Anthony Azizi	Omar				Recurring		Recurring
Zoë Bell	Regina				Recurring		
Grant Bowler	Gault				Recurring		
Susan Duerden	Carole Littleton				Guest	Recurring	
Kevin Durand	Martin Keamy				Recurring		Recurring
Lance Reddick	Matthew Abaddon				Recurring	Guest	
Fisher Stevens	George Minkowski				Recurring		Guest
Reiko Aylesworth	Amy Goodspeed					Recurring	
Marvin DeFreitas	Charlie Hume					Recurring	
Patrick Fischler	Phil					Recurring	
Brad William Henke	Bram					Recurring	Guest
Leslie Ishii	Lara Chang					Recurring	
Eric Lange	Stuart Radzinsky					Recurring	
Molly McGivern	Rosie					Recurring	
Marc Menard	Montand					Recurring	
Mark Pellegrino	Jacob					Recurring	Recurring
Saïd Taghmaoui	Caesar					Recurring	
Titus Welliver	Man in Black					Recurring	Recurring
Sean Whalen	Neil "Frogurt"					Recurring	Recurring
John Hawkes	Lennon						Recurring
Fred Koehler	Seamus						Recurring
Sheila Kelley	Zoe						Recurring
Dylan Minnette	David Shephard						Recurring
Hiroyuki Sanada	Dogen						Recurring

== Main characters ==
Characters are listed alphabetically. "Starring season(s)" refers to the season in which an actor or actress received star billing for playing a character. "Recurring season(s)" identifies a season in which an actor or actress appeared, but received guest star or special guest star billing.

Name	Actor	Starring seasons	Recurring season
Richard Alpert	Nestor Carbonell	6	3, 4, 5
Nestor Carbonell Richard Alpert is the seemingly ageless advisor to the leader of The Others. Richard once lived in the Canary Islands with his ailing wife in the year 1867. After accidentally killing a greedy doctor while seeking medicine for his wife, he was sold into slavery just minutes before his planned execution. He was imprisoned on the Black Rock as it set sail for the New World. However, a raging storm caused the slave ship to be beached on the island. The Man in Black attempted to trick him into killing Jacob, but Richard was instead recruited by Jacob as an advisor. Jacob also granted Richard eternal youth. Richard has since acted as advisor to the many leaders of the Others, including Ben Linus and Charles Widmore. At the end of the series he is once again able to age and leaves the Island on the Ajira Flight.
Kate Austen	Evangeline Lilly	1, 2, 3, 4, 5, 6	—N/a
Evangeline Lilly After killing her abusive stepfather (later revealed to be her real father), Kate goes on the run and is eventually captured by a federal marshal while in Australia after being taken in by a farmer, Ray Mullen, who planned and carried out his idea of handing her in for the $23,000 reward after seeing her mugshot. Kate works on his farm for nearly three months before being handed over to the US Marshall. On the island, Kate is helpful and participates in leadership alongside Jack. Even though her fugitive status is revealed to the survivors, she still earns their trust. Kate finds herself attracted to Jack and Sawyer, both of whom love her. They each represent a side of her duality and inner conflict. And while circumstances allow for Kate to confront her feelings for Sawyer first and they have an affair, it very quickly unravels due mutual distrust and Kate's deeper and unrelenting feelings for Jack. After escaping the island, she is put on trial for murder, Jack is a character witness at her trial and perjures himself to protect Kate in the hope of jury leniency. Jack's testimony sways Kate's mother from testifying against her and Kate subsequently makes a highly favorable plea bargain that does not require prison time. Kate and Jack eventually move in together and become engaged. They raise Claire's son Aaron as their own, with Kate pretending to be his biological mother as part of the Oceanic 6 cover story. Jack's guilt over raising his nephew while leaving Claire, his sister, and the others behind eventually overwhelms him. He succumbs to bouts of paranoia, jealousy that eventually makes him turn to alcohol and prescription drugs, behaviors that will undo his engagement and send him into depression. At first, Kate resists returning to the island, but eventually decides that she will. She arrives on the island in 1977 and joins the Dharma Initiative, along with Jack and Hurley. Along with them she returns to the present time and searches for Claire. She mortally wounds the Man in Black during his fight with Jack. She pleads with Jack to let the island sink and return home with her. But Jack knows he is mortally wounded and cannot abdicate his responsibility to protect the island. Kate tearfully kisses him good bye and declares her love for him one final time and leaves the Island on the Ajira to fulfill her promise to herself and Jack to reunite Claire with Aaron.
Juliet Burke	Elizabeth Mitchell	3, 4, 5	6
Elizabeth Mitchell Juliet is a fertility doctor recruited by the Others. She develops a relationship with Goodwin, who is killed by Ana Lucia, and Juliet blames Ben. Ben is in love with her and refuses to let her leave the island - and he orchestrated Goodwin's death out of jealousy. Although Juliet acts initially as Jack's interrogator when he, Sawyer and Kate are captured, she helps them, escapes and joins the Oceanic 815 crash survivors. She defies Ben's orders to infiltrate the survivors' camp, and she has clear romantic feelings for Jack. She is left behind when the Oceanic Six leave the island, and when the recurring time flashes leave Juliet and the others in the mid-1970s, she becomes a mechanic for the Dharma Initiative and starts a relationship with Sawyer. Juliet ultimately dies when she becomes trapped under debris as a result of The Incident and detonates a hydrogen bomb in order to reset the island's timeline.
Boone Carlyle	Ian Somerhalder	1	2, 3, 6
Ian Somerhalder Boone is the stepbrother of Shannon, with whom he is in love. On the island, he spends much of his time with Locke, and together they find the first hatch while tracking Charlie and Claire after they are kidnapped by Ethan. He slowly learns that Shannon is manipulative and does not love him, but he remains protective of her. When John's legs mysteriously malfunction, Boone climbs into a crashed plane, perched in a tree, and uses its radio to contact (although he doesn't know it) the tail section survivors. The plane falls with Boone in it, and his leg and torso are crushed. John carries him back to the camp to be treated by Jack and Sun, but Boone dies shortly thereafter.
Ana Lucia Cortez	Michelle Rodriguez	2	1, 5, 6
Michelle Rodriguez A former LAPD police officer, Ana Lucia is the leader of the survivors of the tail section of Flight 815. She loses her job as a police officer after killing the man who had previously shot her, killing her unborn child. She meets Christian at LAX and agrees to accompany him to Australia. Before the flight back to L.A. she chats up Jack, who she doesn't know is Christian's son, at the airport bar. Ana Lucia is very protective of her fellow survivors after several are kidnapped, and she is extremely distrusting of others. She eventually kills Goodwin after discovering that he is not a survivor of the crash. She also inadvertently kills Shannon. Ana Lucia is shot and killed by Michael Dawson while he tries to free Ben, the leader of the "Others", but she appears after her death in visions to several of the characters, notably Hurley.
Michael Dawson	Harold Perrineau	1, 2, 4	6
Harold Perrineau Michael is a New York artist and construction worker who has not communicated with his son Walt since he was a baby. When Walt's mother dies in Australia, Michael comes to collect his son (and Walt's dog, Vincent). Michael is the first on the island to learn that Sun speaks English, and he has various conflicts with Jin. While trying to escape the Island via raft, Michael's son Walt is abducted by the Others. Michael strikes a deal with the Others wherein he exchanges Kate, Jack, Sawyer, and Hurley for Walt, and together the two leave the island by boat. However; when they return home, Walt goes to live with his grandmother after finding out that Michael killed Libby and Ana Lucia while carrying out his part of the deal. Michael tries to commit suicide a couple times but soon finds out that "the island won't let him die". He later infiltrates the Kahana freighter crew under the orders of Ben, in the hopes of making up for the lives he took by saving those of the people left on the island. He is killed in an explosion on the Kahana while trying to deactivate a bomb.
Mr. Eko	Adewale Akinnuoye-Agbaje	2, 3	—N/a
Adewale Akinnuoye-Agbaje Mr. Eko is a former Nigerian drug lord turned priest who crashes on the island with the tail section survivors. After killing two of the others who were trying to kidnap him he does not speak for 40 days. Upon joining the fuselage survivors' camp, Eko becomes part of the group involved in pressing a button in a hatch. He begins building a church on the island with Charlie, but this is abandoned when he becomes obsessed with the hatch and the button within. Eko is haunted by visions of his brother, who died in Nigeria and whose body was on a plane that crashed on the island before Eko's arrival. These visions lead Eko and John to discover another Dharma station. Eko meets the smoke monster on more than one occasion in the Island's forests, and is eventually killed by it.
Daniel Faraday	Jeremy Davies	4, 5	6
Jeremy Davies Faraday is a physicist hired to go to the Island by Charles Widmore, who is later revealed to be his father. He initially claims to have intentions to save the 815 crash survivors, but this proves to be untrue. Daniel is connected to Desmond in several ways - Desmond visits him at Oxford during a flashback in time. Daniel's half sister, Penelope Widmore, is also romantically involved with Desmond - the two of them have a child together, named after Charlie Pace. Later, when John moves the island, Daniel travels back in time and visits Desmond in the hatch, to tell him how to save the island. Although he initially lied about his intent to save the survivors, Daniel ends up ferrying several of them, including Sun and Jin, to the Kahana. He is later revealed to be the son of Eloise Hawking and Charles Widmore, and is shot and killed by his mother in the season 5 episode The Variable.
Nikki Fernandez	Kiele Sanchez	3	4 (only footage)
Kiele Sanchez Nikki is an actress who, with her boyfriend Paulo, murders a television producer for his diamonds. When they get to the island they spend their time searching for the diamonds lost in the crash. Paulo discovers the diamonds and tries to hide them from her, but she retaliates by attacking him with a spider with a powerful paralyzing bite. However she herself is then bitten, and both are buried alive by the survivors, who mistake their paralytic coma for death.
James "Sawyer" Ford	Josh Holloway	1, 2, 3, 4, 5, 6	—N/a
Josh Holloway James is a confidence man who was orphaned as a child when his father killed his mother - and himself - after his mother was conned for all their money by a man named Sawyer. All that James knows about the man who conned her is his name, and he adopts the name "Sawyer" for himself, and goes on to con various women for hundreds of thousands of dollars when he is an adult. With Cassidy, one of these women, he has a daughter named Clementine whom he has never met. He travels to Australia to kill the man he believes is the original Sawyer, but he is wrong and kills an innocent man. On the Island, he is initially disliked for his antisocial behaviour and for his practice of nicknaming his fellow survivors, but he becomes romantically involved with Kate and, eventually, friendly with the rest despite his rough personality. When John moves the island and the remaining survivors are launched back into the 1970s, Sawyer joins the Dharma Initiative under the name Jim LaFleur, and he becomes head of security because of his ability to deal with the Hostiles. He falls in love with Juliet, and they are living together three years later. Juliet later dies of her injuries she received during the Incident after the characters return to the present time, causing Sawyer to temporarily join the Man in Black. He leaves the Island with Kate and Claire on the Ajira plane at the end of the series.
Desmond David Hume	Henry Ian Cusick	3, 4, 5, 6	2
Henry Ian Cusick Desmond, a former monk and member of the Royal Scots Regiment, undertakes a boat race around the world after splitting with his girlfriend Penelope Widmore. He shipwrecks on the island while on this race, and he lives in a hatch for three years, pressing a button every 108 minutes. One day he neglects to push the button, and on this day Flight 815 crashes. The survivors find the hatch and blow it open, and when they take over pushing the button he attempts (unsuccessfully) to escape the island. After he returns to the island, he moves in with the crash survivors. At the start of the third season, Desmond starts seeing flashes of future events, most of them being about Charlie's death. Later, he experiences flashes into the past. He escapes the Island with the Oceanic Six at the end of season four and is reunited with his girlfriend, Penny. They are married and have a baby boy named Charlie. Desmond has various meetings with Eloise Hawking who urges him not to marry Penny Widmore. He later finds out she is Daniel Faraday's mother, locates her through Charles Widmore, and visits her at the Lamppost. He is later brought back to the Island by Charles Widmore in order to uncork the heart of the Island to make the Man in Black mortal. It is implied that Desmond eventually returned home to Penny and their son.
Sayid Jarrah	Naveen Andrews	1, 2, 3, 4, 5, 6	—N/a
Naveen Andrews A former military communications officer, Sayid is haunted by his past as a torturer for the Iraqi Republican Guard. On the island, he is romantically involved with Shannon. After escaping the island and coming to America, he reunites with and marries his former girlfriend Nadia. After Nadia is murdered, Sayid is employed by Ben as an assassin to kill the associates of Charles Widmore. He later attempts to kill Ben as a child after being brought back to the island and captured by the Dharma Initiative in 1977. Sayid is shot and killed by members of the DHARMA Initiative, but is later revived through mysterious means at the Others' temple. It is implied that in being revived in such a way, he has lost his ability to feel emotion. When the Man in Black tricks Jack into carrying a bomb aboard Widmore's submarine, Sayid hurries the bomb to the other side of the vessel in order to detonate it away from the other survivors, dying in the process.
Jin-Soo Kwon	Daniel Dae Kim	1, 2, 3, 4, 5, 6	—N/a
Daniel Dae Kim The son of a poor fisherman, Jin marries Sun on the condition that he work for her father as a mob enforcer. On the island, Jin struggles as the only castaway who does not speak English, although he does eventually begin to learn. He is presumed dead by his wife, Sun-Hwa Kwon, and the other members of the Oceanic Six, when a bomb goes off on the Kahana. Kwon is later found unconscious on driftwood by a French research team in 1988, having flashed to that time period with the other people on the island. After the survivors are returned to the same timeline, Jin spends much of his time searching for Sun. He eventually finds her with the other survivors on Hydra Island. When the group tries to escape on Charles Widmore's submarine, a bomb smuggled aboard by the Man in Black detonates, pinning Sun to the inside of the sub. Unable to rescue his wife, Jin opts to die with her so they will never be apart again.
Sun-Hwa Kwon	Yunjin Kim	1, 2, 3, 4, 5, 6	—N/a
Yunjin Kim The rich daughter of a hotel owner/automobile manufacturer with ties to the Korean mob, Sun has an affair and almost leaves her husband Jin before the crash. They reconcile on the island and she becomes pregnant with Jin's baby. After escaping the island, Sun gives birth to Jin's baby, a girl named Ji Yeon, off the island. With the settlement money from Oceanic, Sun buys a controlling share of her father's company. Sun eventually returns to the island on Ajira Airways Flight 316 to search for Jin, but is not propelled to 1977 with the other members of the Oceanic Six and instead remains in 2007. After the timelines reunite, Jin and Sun eventually reunite. When the group tries to escape on Charles Widmore's submarine, a bomb smuggled aboard by the Man in Black detonates, pinning Sun to the inside of the sub. She is unable to escape and drowns along with her husband Jin.
Frank Lapidus	Jeff Fahey	6	4, 5
Jeff Fahey Frank Lapidus /ləˈpiːdəs/ is a pilot who was originally supposed to fly Oceanic 815. He is selected by Abaddon to be part of the team that travels to the Island via the freighter Kahana; he brings Daniel, Miles and Charlotte to the Island by helicopter and ultimately helps Desmond and the Oceanic Six escape the Island. An avid conspiracy theorist, Frank realized that the plane found at the bottom of the ocean was actually planted by Charles Widmore, which is possibly why he was asked on the mission. In the episode "316", he pilots Flight 316 that five of the Oceanic Six and Ben Linus board to return to the Island. Frank makes a controlled crash landing on the nearby Hydra Island. At the end of the series he flies some of the remaining survivors off the Island on the Ajira flight.
Charlotte Staples Lewis	Rebecca Mader	4, 5	6
Rebecca Mader Charlotte is an anthropologist hired to go to the Island by Charles Widmore. Miles suggests that she has been to the Island before and she chooses to stay there when given the option to leave. She later dies as a result of the ill effects of the Island's erratic movements through time after she admits she was born on the Island, her parents being members of the DHARMA Initiative.
Benjamin Linus	Michael Emerson	3, 4, 5, 6	2
Michael Emerson Ben is the manipulative leader of the Others. He is captured by the survivors and is held hostage in a hatch that Boone and Locke found. However Michael releases him in return for the safe passage of himself and his son, Walt, back home. In the finale of the 4th season he is forced to leave the Island after he "moves" it. He returns to the island in the fifth season with the Oceanic 6, to be judged by the mysterious smoke monster for letting his daughter die. The monster lets him live as long as he follows John, which results in him killing Jacob. He begins to regret his actions and seeks to redeem himself. At the end of the series he becomes Hurley's second-in-command.
Claire Littleton	Emilie de Ravin	1, 2, 3, 4, 6	5 (only footage)
Emilie De Ravin Claire gives birth on the island to a boy and forges a strong relationship with Charlie. After being abducted by Ethan Rom, she escapes and briefly loses her memory. She is also Jack's half-sister. She is not aware of this, but Jack learns this from her mother after he leaves the Island. Claire is later seen in Jacob's hut with her father after leaving her son, Aaron, at the foot of a tree. Claire returns to prominence in season six, her time spent alone on the island having left her in a disturbed and feral state. She leaves the Island with Kate and Sawyer at the end of the series.
Walter "Walt" Lloyd	Malcolm David Kelley	1, 2	3, 4, 5, 6
Malcolm David Kelley An elementary school student, he is kidnapped by the Others, who claim that he is "special". He is rescued by his father Michael and goes to live with his grandmother in New York. In the epilogue "New Man In Charge", he is shown to be joining Hurley and Ben as they return to the Island.
John Locke	Terry O'Quinn	1, 2, 3, 4, 5, 6	—N/a
Terry O'Quinn After having his paralysis healed during the crash, Locke lives out his dreams of becoming a hunter on the Island. John Locke is also the name of a philosopher. Being a man of faith, he believes he has a special connection with the island, leading him to clash with man-of-science Jack. Having been "chosen", Locke becomes the leader of the Others at the end of the fourth season. Locke is eventually murdered by Ben shortly after leaving the island. When most of the "Oceanic Six" survivors return to the island, they transport Locke's body with them. Locke apparently returns to life, but this is revealed to be a deception; Locke is still dead, and the individual in Locke's form is actually Jacob's rival.
The Man in Black	Titus Welliver; Terry O'Quinn (in Locke's form); Ryan Bradford (young)	5, 6	1, 2, 3, 4
Titus Welliver The unnamed entity commonly referred to as the Man in Black, also known as the Monster or the Black Smoke, is the twin brother of Jacob and the main antagonist during the final season of the series. In season one, he kills the pilot of Oceanic 815. His avatars include Jacob's twin brother, Jack's father Christian, Eko's brother Yemi, and John Locke. He cannot leave the island as long as Jacob or one of his successors is still on the island and we are told that if he does leave the island, everyone on earth will die. He first appears as a cloud of black smoke, but can apparently take on the appearance of anyone who is dead. In his Locke avatar, which we are told he cannot now change, he takes offense when Ben calls him a Monster. He claims that he is not evil, and just wants to escape the island. Thus, he begins to recruit allies to escape with him such as Sawyer, Claire, Sayid, and Kate. According to Rousseau and Ben, the Man in Black (in his Monster form) serves as a security system and judge to the Island. He has limitations. He cannot penetrate the DHARMA sonar fence, go through the ash that surrounds Jacob's cabin, or enter the temple while a guardian is alive. He cannot personally kill Jacob or any of the candidates chosen by Jacob to succeed him. He manipulates Ben, by impersonating Locke and Ben's daughter, and eventually convinces Ben to kill Jacob. He then attempts to kill Jacob's remaining candidates, and later tries to destroy the Island. Normally invincible, he inadvertently becomes mortal when Desmond Hume temporarily halts the island's primordial power. He is defeated while in mortal form in the series finale when Kate shoots him and Jack kicks him off a cliff, permanently killing him.
Charlie Pace	Dominic Monaghan	1, 2, 3	4, 6
Dominic Monaghan A one-hit wonder, rock musician Charlie ends his addiction to heroin on the island and cares for Claire and her baby. After several times of Desmond predicting his death, he drowns in the Looking Glass station, trying to help the survivors communicate with the outside world.
Paulo	Rodrigo Santoro	3	—N/a
Rodrigo Santoro Paulo helps Nikki murder a television executive for his diamonds. He spends his time on the island with Nikki searching for the diamonds. He is assumed dead on the island after being buried alive, the survivors having assumed he was dead following a paralyzing spider bite.
Hugo "Hurley" Reyes	Jorge Garcia	1, 2, 3, 4, 5, 6	—N/a
Jorge Garcia After winning the lottery with the numbers, Hurley suffers from bad luck. He remains optimistic on the island but after escaping from it is hospitalized for psychiatric reasons that include recurring hallucinations involving Charlie. He later returns to the island aboard flight 316 and joins the Dharma Initiative in 1977 along with Jack and Kate. In the series finale, Jack makes Hugo the new "Guardian" of the Island.
Shannon Rutherford	Maggie Grace	1, 2	3, 6
Maggie Grace Shannon is a ballet instructor and Boone's stepsister. When they are marooned on the island, Shannon is very unhelpful and spends most of her time sunbathing. Her French skills come in handy when she translates the transceiver and Danielle Rousseau's maps, and her relationship with Sayid reveals a more friendly side to Shannon. Shannon is devastated when her brother Boone dies, and she holds Locke at gunpoint in the jungle thinking he is responsible for Boone's death. Before Walt leaves the island on the raft, he leaves Vincent in Shannon's care. At the start of Season 2, Shannon is mourning the loss of her brother Boone. She loses Vincent in the jungle and sees Walt. No one believes her when she tells the others. Her relationship with Sayid grows. Shannon continues to see Walt in the jungle, so she runs after him but is accidentally shot by Ana Lucia Cortez. She dies almost instantly in Sayid's arms, leaving Sayid heartbroken. At Shannon's funeral, Sayid confesses that he was deeply in love with her.
Jack Shephard	Matthew Fox	1, 2, 3, 4, 5, 6	—N/a
Matthew Fox The main character of the show, Jack is a gifted spinal surgeon who is burdened by the pressures and high expectations of his demanding father, who is also a highly regarded neurosurgeon. This complicated father-son relationship impacts Jack throughout his life, including his personal relationships. From the first moments of the crash, Jack jumps into action using his medical skills to help his fellow castaways. Because of his caring nature and strong work ethic, the survivors turn to him as their leader. Early on, he meets Kate who tends to his wounds despite her lack of medical experience and fear. Jack and Kate develop romantic feelings for one another, struggling with their differences and personal demons while maintaining a deep emotional and sexual attraction to one another. After escaping the island, Jack and Kate fully consummate their feelings for one another and become engaged. Unfortunately, Jack's profound guilt over leaving fellow survivors behind slowly eats away at Jack, resulting in paranoia and a prescription drug addiction. Jack's downward spiral eventually unravels his relationship with Kate, after which he falls into further despair, eventually becoming suicidal. Jack believes he needs to return to the island to save everyone left behind, and to hopefully rekindle his relationship with Kate. He returns to the island and appears in 1977 with Kate and Hurley, and they all join the Dharma Initiative. It is revealed in Season 6 that Jack is Jacob's "Candidate", and will replace Jacob as the Guardian or keeper of the island. In the series finale, with the assistance of Kate, he kills the Man in Black and saves the Island from being destroyed, but is mortally wounded in the process and makes Hurley his successor. Kate begs Jack to let the island sink and to leave with her. She declares her love for him one final time before saying goodbye. In the afterlife, Kate is waiting for him and they are finally reunited and together. He is last seen dying in the same spot where he first landed on the Island.
Elizabeth "Libby" Smith	Cynthia Watros	2	4, 6
Cynthia Watros Libby is a tail section survivor. Prior to the crash of 815, she met Desmond and gave him her late-husband David's boat for the around the world race that ended with Desmond crashing on the island. She is also revealed to have been a patient in the same mental institution at the same time as Hurley. She becomes romantically involved with Hurley. She is shot to death by Michael after accidentally witnessing Ana Lucia's death.
Miles Straume	Ken Leung	4, 5, 6	—N/a
Ken Leung Miles is a spiritualist hired by Charles Widmore to go to the Island. He has the ability to read the final thoughts of the deceased. He has the most cutting wit out of the Kahana away team members, earning him a comparison to Sawyer by Hurley. It is later revealed that he is the son of Dr. Pierre Chang. In the series finale he leaves the Island on the Ajira plane.
Ilana Verdansky	Zuleikha Robinson	6	5
Zuleikha Robinson Ilana claims to be a bounty hunter working for the family of Peter Avellino, who is an employee of Charles Widmore, and who is killed by Sayid. She captures Sayid and puts him on Ajira Flight 316. After the crash she leads a hostile takeover of the Flight 316 survivors with Bram and several others. She asks Frank Lapidus if he knows "what lies in the shadow of the statue", then knocks him unconscious when he is unable to answer. It is later revealed that she was brought to the Island by Jacob, for the purpose of protecting the candidates for Jacob's replacement. Ilana is killed when she mishandles dynamite while on a mission to prevent the Man in Black from leaving the Island.

== Supporting characters ==
=== Minor Oceanic 815 crash survivors ===
Name	Actor	Season(s)
Leslie Arzt	Daniel Roebuck	1, 3, 6
Dr. Leslie Arzt is a junior high school science teacher, who crashes with the fuselage survivors and keeps a collection of native fauna in various jars. Almost all characters continue to pronounce his name "Arts" even though he repeatedly corrects them. Arzt complains about not being included in the various missions of Jack and Locke, finally joining them on a trip to the Black Rock. He dies ironically when a stick of dynamite spontaneously explodes in his hand while he lectures Jack, Locke, Kate and Hurley on how to safely handle it. In the alternate timeline, he is working at the school where he helps Ben to expose the principal of his actions. His name, "Arzt", is the German word for "physician". Despite his early demise, his advice is invaluable to the Survivors, even years later.
Cindy Chandler	Kimberley Joseph	1, 2, 3, 6
Cindy Chandler is an Australian Oceanic Airlines stewardess dating the Flight 815 passenger Gary Troup and is the only crew member other than Seth Norris to survive the crash. She is featured in the Pilot episode as giving Jack a small bottle of alcohol, which is the first thing Jack discovers after the plane crash. She crashes with the tail-section survivors and is taken by the Others in the second season during the journey to the fuselage survivors' camp. Cindy lives comfortably with the Others following her abduction firstly at the Hydra station then at the Temple, caring for Zach and Emma. To avoid death, she aligns with the Man in Black following the temple massacre. She survives Widmore's mortar attack and survives the series to live under Hurley's guard.
Emma and Zach	Kiersten Havelock and Mickey Graue	2, 3, 6
Emma and Zach are two sibling children from the tail section of the plane who live under the care of Cindy, following the pair's kidnapping. With Cindy, they follow the Man in Black. Their ultimate fate is never resolved onscreen.
Bernard Nadler	Sam Anderson	2, 3, 4, 5, 6
An American dentist, Dr. Bernard Nadler weds Rose Henderson less than one year prior to the crash. He crashes with the tail section survivors, but joins the fuselage survivors in season two. Bernard stays with the majority of the group after some of the freighter crew arrive. He and Rose are last found to have travelled back in time to 1977 after the island skips around in time. Together they choose to live alone on the beach, avoiding both Dharma and the Others. They later return to the present time and help Desmond out of a well, and after a run-in with the Man in Black, choose to stay on the island at the end of the series.
Rose Henderson Nadler	L. Scott Caldwell	1, 2, 3, 4, 5, 6
A woman with terminal cancer from the Bronx, New York, Rose Henderson-Nadler marries Bernard less than a year before the crash. She lives with the fuselage survivors and reunites with Bernard in season two. She opts to return to the beach at the beginning of season four when the survivors contact the freighter. She and Bernard are last found to have traveled back in time to 1977 after the island skips around in time. They later return to the present time and help Desmond out of a well, and after a run-in with the man in black, choose to stay on the island at the end of the series.
Scott Jackson and Steve Jenkins	Dustin Watchman and Christian Bowman	1, 2, 3, 5
Scott Jackson and Steve Jenkins crash with the fuselage survivors. They are regularly confused with each other, even after one of them (Scott) is killed in the first season by Ethan. In season five, Steve and the remaining minor Flight 815 castaways are killed by a fire arrow attack right after the island jumps in time (except for two unnamed men, who are later killed by claymore mines at the creek).
Edward Mars	Fredric Lane	1, 2, 3, 6
Edward Mars is a U.S. marshal who is obsessed with capturing Kate, finally apprehending her in Australia. He is critically injured during the crash and dies in the third episode.
Seth Norris	Greg Grunberg	1, 4, 6
Seth Norris is the pilot of the airplane (Flight 815), which crashes on the island. He is found in the cockpit in the first episode by Jack, Kate and Charlie and soon after is killed by "the Monster".
Gary Troup	Laird Granger and Frank Torres	Lost Experience, 1
Gary Troup is the New York author of the metafictional novel, Bad Twin, and is Cindy's lover. He dies when he is sucked into the plane's turbine immediately after the plane crash.
Vincent	Madison and Pono	1, 2, 3, 4, 5, 6
Vincent is Walt's yellow Labrador retriever, who is originally owned by Walt's stepfather, Brian Porter. Vincent first appears in the opening scene of the series when he encounters Jack in the jungle. He is left behind on the Island when Michael and Walt leave and, at Walt's request, remains in Shannon's care until she dies. He is later seen accompanying Sun. After the timeshifts and an attack on the survivors, Vincent ends up with Rose and Bernard in 1974. All three make a new home in the jungle and are found three years later by Sawyer, Juliet and Kate. Vincent is last seen at Jack's side in the series finale, recalling the opening scene of the pilot episode.
Neil "Frogurt"	Sean Whalen	5, 6
Neil is first mentioned when Bernard is trying to make an S.O.S sign out of rocks. He is first seen in the mobisode "The Adventures of Hurley and Frogurt". He first appears in the TV series in the season 5 premiere, "Because You Left" and "The Lie". He is on the Zodiac raft with Daniel Faraday when the island shifts in time. He is killed in 1954 when he is shot by flaming arrows in the chest and back.

=== The Others ===
Name	Actor	Season(s)
Jacob	Mark Pellegrino / Kenton Duty (young)	5, 6
Jacob is The Others' highest authority and has resided on the island for nearly 2,000 years, most recently in a chamber in the foot of the statue of Tawaret, which is the statue's only remaining component. The backstory of Jacob is revealed in the episode "Across the Sea", which, according to the episode's script, took place in A.D. 44; it also revealed the mysterious Man in Black (a.k.a. the "smoke monster") is his fraternal twin and assumed his current supernatural form after an altercation with Jacob. Jacob is the protector of the Island and is able to visit various Flight 815 survivors prior to their arrival, speaking to and conspicuously touching several of the main characters. It seems he granted Richard Alpert's agelessness by touching him on the shoulder (episode "Ab Aeterno"). Ben initially claims to John Locke that he can communicate with Jacob but later reveals he is lying out of embarrassment for his inability to do so, despite being leader of The Others. The figure in the mysterious cabin, who reacted violently to John Locke's flashlight and later is heard by Locke to say "Help me", is at one point presumed to be Jacob; however, it is later implied it may have been his brother, trapped on the island in his "smoke monster" form by Jacob's presence and, as such, has been scheming to ensure Jacob's downfall. The Man in Black is able to assume the appearance of deceased bodies on the island and, through an elaborate series of events involving him arranging the death of, and subsequently impersonating, John Locke, eventually manipulates Ben into killing Jacob; this represents a "loophole" from the apparent "rule" the two brothers could not harm one another. However, Jacob returns as a ghost on the island and communicates with Hurley. Also, the Man in Black and Sawyer have seen an apparition of a younger Jacob on the present-day island. Eventually, the ghost of Jacob ceded control of the island to his successor, Jack Shephard.
Alexandra Rousseau	Tania Raymonde	2, 3, 4, 5, 6
Alexandra Rousseau is Danielle Rousseau's daughter, who is abducted by The Others 16 years prior to the crash of Flight 815. Ben is sent by Widmore to kill Danielle and her daughter, but he is unable to bring himself to do so and raises Alex as his own instead. She aids the crash survivors in various escapes and eventually defects from The Others. She dates Karl, though Ben tries to keep them apart because she would die if she became pregnant. She is later kidnapped and murdered by Keamy in front of Ben, in an attempt to make Ben surrender.
Mikhail Bakunin	Andrew Divoff	3, 6
Mikhail Bakunin lives and works at the Flame Dharma station, and is responsible for The Others' communication with the outside world. He is notable for his one eye, usually wearing a black eye-patch. He is captured by a group of 815 survivors and says he remembers Locke from his past. He is responsible for Charlie's death, blowing a hole in the side of the underwater Looking Glass Station, drowning Charlie inside and killing himself in the process. In the alternate 2004, he works alongside Martin Keamy as an interpreter and has both eyes until he is shot and killed by Jin.
Karl Martin	Blake Bashoff	3, 4
Karl Martin is Alex's boyfriend. In an attempt to prevent Karl from impregnating Alex, Ben imprisons him until he is rescued by Kate and Sawyer. Later, he joins the plane crash survivors, and is able to warn them of an impending raid by the Others. He is killed by the mercenaries from the Kahana in season four.
Bea Klugh	April Grace	2, 3
Beatrice Klugh visits Michael during his forced stay with the Others and is present when they capture Jack, Kate and Sawyer. In season three, at the Dharma Flame station, she is found by Sayid, Locke and Kate and has Mikhail kill her to prevent her from being the survivors' prisoner.
Dogen	Hiroyuki Sanada	6
Dogen is one of the leaders of the Others living in the Temple. He speaks Japanese, but knows English. According to Dogen, he does not like "the way English tastes on my tongue" and so he uses an interpreter. He tries to have Sayid killed because of the "infection" claiming Sayid, but Sayid murders him. Before coming to the Island, he was a banker, but when he got his son into a near fatal accident while driving drunk, Jacob offered to save him if Dogen came to the Island. He is drowned by Sayid, who had joined the Man in Black.
Danny Pickett	Michael Bowen	2, 3
Danny Pickett is a violent member of the Others who supervises Kate and Sawyer while they are imprisoned. He is married to another Other named Colleen, who is shot by Sun. Enraged, Pickett takes his anger out on Sawyer, and nearly kills him before Juliet intervenes and shoots Pickett.
Eloise Hawking	Fionnula Flanagan (old), Alice Evans (middle age), Alexandra Krosney (young adult)	3, 5, 6
Eloise Hawking is the caretaker of the L.A.-based Dharma station known as the Lamp Post, which can track the location of the island. Before she is revealed as such, she is introduced as a jewelry store employee who urges Desmond not to marry Penny, and explains the nature of time travel to him. Later, in the monastery Desmond briefly lives in, she also appears in a photograph in the head monk's office. Eloise is the mother of Daniel Faraday, the father being Charles Widmore, and, like Widmore, was formerly a member of the Others. The rat that Daniel trains to run a maze in Desmond's presence is named after her. She instructs Jack, Sun, and Ben on how to get back to the island. In 1977, she is responsible for the death of her own son, having shot him in the back while he was brandishing a gun at Richard Alpert.
Ethan Rom	William Mapother	1, 2, 3, 5, 6
Dr. Ethan Rom is the child of Amy and Horace Goodspeed, and grew up in the Dharma Initiative in the 1970s. After the organization is purged by the Others, Ethan joins the latter group. When Flight 815 crashes on the island, he poses as a fuselage survivor until he is exposed by Hurley, at which point he abducts Claire and Charlie, unsuccessfully attempting to murder the latter. Claire is rescued, and Charlie then kills Ethan in "Homecoming". His name is an anagram of "Other Man." In the alternate timeline he has his parents' last name and examines Claire when she has issues with her pregnancy.
Goodwin Stanhope	Brett Cullen	2, 3, 4
Goodwin Stanhope is married to the Others' therapist, Harper Stanhope. He has an affair with Juliet, which dismays Ben because he too is in love with Juliet. Out of jealousy, Ben sends Goodwin on a mission to infiltrate the tail section survivors, knowing the dangers Goodwin will face. When Goodwin's identity is indeed discovered, Ana Lucia confronts and kills him.
Lennon	John Hawkes	6
Lennon is one of the Others taking refuge in the Temple. He acts as translator for Dogen and was killed by Sayid when he ignored the ultimatum brought forth by The Man in Black.
Tom Friendly	M. C. Gainey	1, 2, 3, 4
Tom Friendly is the second Other the Flight 815 survivors meet after Ethan, when he abducts Walt from the raft and blows it up to sabotage Michael, Jin and Sawyer's escape plan in the season one finale. Tom is later shown acting as a liaison between his group and Jack's in the second season, and in the third season he takes part in many of their operations and conflicts. Initially, Tom wore a distinctive fake beard, as part of the Others' ruse to present themselves as uncivilized and undeveloped island natives. He is shot and killed by Sawyer despite having surrendered in the season three finale. In season four, he appears in a flashback episode; revealed to be gay, he recruits Michael as a spy on Widmore's freighter.
Ryan Pryce	Brian Goodman	3
Ryan Pryce is the Others' chief of security after the death of Danny Pickett. Ben assigns him to lead a team charged with kidnapping all women among the 815 survivors. His team is ambushed by Sayid, Jin, and Bernard, but turns the tables and captures them. He dies when Hurley hits him with a Dharma Initiative van.

=== Dharma Initiative members ===
Name	Actor	Season(s)
Amy	Reiko Aylesworth	5
A member of the Dharma Initiative whose husband was murdered by the Hostiles. Sawyer and Juliet intervened and saved Amy's life. Three years later, Amy was married to Horace Goodspeed and pregnant with his child. When complications arose during the delivery, Juliet was forced to step in and deliver the child, a boy named Ethan.
Phil	Patrick Fischler	5
Phil is a subordinate of Sawyer (under the alias LaFleur) and works as a security personnel for the Dharma Initiative. Phil discovers Sawyer and Kate handed a young Ben over to the Hostiles, so Sawyer ties him up in his house. He is discovered by Radzinsky and assists in trying to extract information from Sawyer by punching Juliet. Phil is killed during the incident at the Swan Station, when, during a last-minute attempt to get payback by killing Sawyer, several pieces of rebar are dragged by the electromagnetic energy and impale him.
Pierre Chang	François Chau	2, 3, 4, 5, 6
Pierre is the scientist in the Dharma Initiative orientation films, who also goes by the names Marvin Candle, Mark Wickmund, and Edgar Halliwax. He appears as an actual character in season 5, where it is revealed he is the father of Miles Straume. Daniel Faraday convinces him that his group is from the future, and gets him to stop the drilling at the Swan Station. Radzinsky, however, overrules him, and Chang's arm is injured when the electromagnetic energy is released. Miles saves his father's life when his arm is crushed underneath a metal component. In the 2004 "flash sideways", Miles mentions his father's work at a museum, and Chang later speaks at an archaeological benefit and gives Hurley Reyes a commemorative trophy. A puppet version built by Jim Henson's Creature Shop appears in Lost Untangled for the final season (played by Allan Trautman), with an appearance by the real Chang close to the end of the series.
Gerald and Karen DeGroot	Michael Gilday and Courtney Lavigne	2
A couple, Doctoral candidates of the University of Michigan, who received funding by the Hanso Foundation in 1970 to create and operate the Dharma Initiative on the island.
Horace Goodspeed	Doug Hutchison	3, 4, 5
The leader of the Dharma Initiative on the island during the 1970s. He is first seen assisting Roger Linus after his son Ben's birth, and he eventually recruits Roger into the Dharma Initiative. Later, Horace is romantically involved with Amy, with whom he fathers a child, a baby named Ethan. Horace also maintains diplomatic relations with the Others, led by Richard Alpert. Horace dies during the Purge, an event during which the Others kill the majority of the Dharma Initiative using poison gas, but he appears to John in a vision many years later.
Alvar Hanso	Ian Patrick Williams	2
A former arms salesman and manufacturer, he is the enigmatic Danish leader of the Hanso Foundation. Hanso can be seen in the show via the orientation film in "Orientation". When Widmore is seen bidding on the Black Rock's ship's log, the log is said to have some connection to the Hanso family. When the Black Rock crashed on the island in 1867, the captain's name also was "Hanso".
Kelvin Joe Inman	Clancy Brown	2
Kelvin is an intelligence operative for the United States government, and responsible for making Sayid torture his former commander in Iraq. Later, Kelvin joins the Dharma Initiative, and operates the Swan Station until Desmond accidentally kills him.
Roger Linus	Jon Gries	3, 5, 6
Roger is Ben's alcoholic father and an employee of the Dharma Initiative. He is distant and cruel to Ben, often ridiculing him for indirectly killing his mother during childbirth, and physically abuses him. Ben later kills him in the Purge. Hurley discovers his corpse in a blue VW van in "Tricia Tanaka Is Dead". In sideways 2004 Roger is living with his son Ben in Los Angeles and is breathing off an oxygen tank apparently suffering from emphysema in "Dr. Linus".
Stuart Radzinsky	Eric Lange	5
Radzinsky is head of research for the Dharma Initiative. In the 70s he worked in the Flame and designed the Swan. Years later he would live in the Swan and press the button every 108 minutes with Kelvin Joe Inman. Kelvin claimed Radzinsky killed himself by putting a shotgun in his mouth. Secretive, testy with everyone he encounters and trigger happy, Radzinsky is a control freak.

=== Widmore and employees ===
Name	Actor	Season(s)
Charles Widmore	Alan Dale (old); Tom Connolly (young); David S. Lee (middle age)	2, 3, 4, 5, 6
A wealthy industrialist, Widmore is the father of Penelope Widmore and benefactor of Daniel Faraday (later revealed to be his son with Eloise Hawking). Widmore is Ben's predecessor as leader of the Others on the island. He is exiled by Ben, who claims Widmore is an enemy of the people on the island. Widmore admits to Daniel Faraday he staged the find of the false plane wreckage of Oceanic 815, and he sends the freighter Kahana to the Island in order to find and capture Ben, which is unsuccessful. Widmore disapproves of his daughter's relationship with Desmond Hume and is estranged from her. However, when Desmond is searching for Eloise Hawking, it is Widmore who informs him of her location in Los Angeles. He is still actively searching for the Island and tries to assist Locke in reuniting the Oceanic Six into going back to the Island. Later, he returns to the island with Desmond Hume, who he describes as a "failsafe". He gives this information to the Man in Black in return for a guarantee of safety for his daughter Penny, but Ben shoots him dead.
Penelope "Penny" Hume	Sonya Walger	2, 3, 4, 5, 6
Penny is Desmond's wife and the estranged daughter of Charles Widmore, as well as the half sister to Daniel Faraday. Before Desmond went missing and crashed on the island she was his longtime girlfriend, although they broke up shortly before. Nevertheless, Penny searched for any sign of him and was alerted to his location when the Swan DHARMA station exploded at the end of season two. At the end of season three she was able to communicate briefly with Charlie after the jamming of communications from the island was lifted. When Desmond made contact with Penelope during "The Constant" the communication was garbled just as she began to tell how she knew of the Island, but confirmed she knew of it. She was able to rescue Desmond, the Oceanic Six and Frank by boat at the end of season four. Desmond and Penny then married and proceeded to have a son, whom they also named Charlie. Ben Linus hunts Penelope down with intent to kill her in retaliation for his own daughter's death indirectly at the hands of Charles Widmore, but he changes heart when he sees she is now a mother.
Matthew Abaddon	Lance Reddick	4, 5
Matthew Abaddon works for Widmore by "helping people get to where they're supposed to be". He is responsible for Locke going on his walkabout that ultimately leads him to the Island. After the crash, Matthew hires Naomi, Miles, Faraday, Charlotte, and Lapidus to go to the Island via the freighter Kahana. He visits Hurley at the mental institution after the Oceanic 6 rescue and tries to gather information on where the other survivors are. Matthew acts as a chauffeur for Locke after he leaves the Island, helping him in his mission to convince the Oceanic 6 to return to the Island. During Locke's mission, Matthew is shot dead by Ben who claims he is a "dangerous person".
Naomi Dorrit	Marsha Thomason	3, 4, 5
Recruited by Matthew Abaddon and employed by Charles Widmore, Naomi is the leader of the group on a mission to capture Ben Linus and remove him from the island. She is the first to arrive on the island and tells the Oceanic survivors of the freighter Kahana. While she claims she is there to rescue Desmond Hume, her true mission is later revealed. Naomi dies of her wounds after Locke throws a knife into her back.
Martin Keamy	Kevin Durand	4, 5, 6
Martin Keamy is the lead mercenary on the Kahana and is a former Marine. Keamy leads a team onto the island to find Ben, killing Karl and Danielle Rousseau and later executing Alex in front of Ben. Keamy eventually tracks Ben down and is stabbed to death by him. His death causes the freighter to explode via a fail-deadly switch that monitors his heartbeat.
Captain Gault	Grant Bowler	4
Gault (first name unknown) is the captain of the freighter Kahana sent by Widmore to find the island and Benjamin Linus. He is originally seen as antagonistic and untrustworthy, but he later becomes an ally of Desmond and Sayid, allowing them the freighter's zodiac boat to ferry castaways from the island to the freighter after he becomes concerned at the lengths Keamy is willing to go to secure Ben. He is shot dead by Keamy after he confronts Keamy at gunpoint in "Cabin Fever".
Omar	Anthony Azizi	4, 6
Omar is one of the mercenaries sent by Charles Widmore to the Island aboard the freighter Kahana.
Zoe	Sheila Kelley	6
Zoe is a geophysicist recruited by Widmore to lead his scientific team. She is first encountered by Sawyer, when she tries to pass herself off as a survivor of Ajira 316. She later leads the team in kidnapping Jin and bringing him to Hydra Island. The Man in Black cuts her throat after Widmore orders her not to speak, his argument being that she serves no purpose if she can't speak.
George Minkowski	Fisher Stevens	4, 6
George Minkowski was the communications officer aboard Widmore's freighter. Although he at first obstructs the survivors' attempts to contact the outside world, he later assists Desmond in calling Penny. He ultimately dies of temporal displacement on the boat. He later appears in the Sideways world as Desmond's driver, where he gives him the Oceanic 815 manifest.

=== Miscellaneous characters ===
Name	Actor	Season(s)
Aaron Littleton	Various; William Blanchette (Toddler version)	1, 2, 3, 4, 5, 6
Aaron is the son of Claire Littleton and her former boyfriend Thomas. Aaron is born on the island and leaves it, then being raised by Kate with the public perceiving the baby to be hers, to follow along with their almost entirely false version of what happened on the island.
Anthony Cooper	Kevin Tighe	1, 2, 3, 6
Anthony Cooper is a ruthless con man, John Locke's biological father and the man who conned Sawyer's parents, leading to their deaths. Cooper cons Locke into donating a kidney to him before abandoning him. He later comes to make amends with Locke when he convinces Locke to help him retrieve money he owes to a couple of heavies. When Locke begins to interfere with one of his schemes, Cooper pushes Locke out of an eighth-story window, paralyzing him. Cooper is later brought to the Island by the Others, and Sawyer kills him as revenge for the death of his parents. In the flash sideways world, he is in a vegetative state following an accident that also paralyzed Locke.
Bram	Brad William Henke	5, 6
Bram is a mysterious person who seems to oppose Widmore's organization. He appeared to Miles in 2004 and asked him not to go to the island. Bram is also onboard Ajira Flight 316 and has an unknown tie with Ilana. They've both asked the enigmatic question, "What lies in the Shadow of the Statue?". Bram was killed by Jacob's nemesis, The Man in Black, in the form of the smoke monster.
Caesar	Saïd Taghmaoui	5
Caesar boards the Ajira Flight 316 along with the returning Oceanic survivors, and when the plane makes an emergency landing on the Hydra Island, he interacts with Ben, Frank, Locke and Ilana. He finds a sawed-off shotgun in Ben's old office and shows it to Ben, who later steals the weapon and uses it to shoot Caesar.
Christian Shephard	John Terry	1, 2, 3, 4, 5, 6
Christian Shephard, Jack's father, works as the chief of surgery at St. Sebastian Hospital. He loses his medical license when Jack reveals to the authorities that Christian performed surgery on a pregnant woman while drunk, causing her death. Christian then heads to Australia with Ana Lucia in tow to hunt down his daughter Claire, whom he is subsequently barred from seeing. He dies in Australia after days of drinking, after having first met and having a heart-to-heart with Sawyer. His body is being brought back to L.A. by Jack for his funeral when the plane crashes, but when the coffin is later recovered on the Island, it is mysteriously empty. Christian has appeared multiple times on the Island to many different characters, including Jack, Claire, Locke, Hurley, Miles, Michael and even Vincent. He is connected somehow to either Jacob or Jacob's rival, a connection that became less clear when it was revealed that Jacob, whose cabin Christian had been seen in, hadn't actually been at the cabin for some time, but somebody else had. Christian also appears in the well when John is trying to move the island. After the Ajira flight crash, he also advises Sun and Frank that Jin and the others left behind, are now living in 1977. In the season 6 episode, The Last Recruit, it is revealed the Man in Black was responsible for Christian's appearances on the island.
Diane Janssen	Beth Broderick	1, 2, 3, 4
The estranged mother of Kate, she turns Kate in to the police after Kate kills Diane's husband and Kate's father, Wayne. Diane never forgives Kate, but decides not to testify at Kate's trial once Kate returns home as part of the Oceanic Six.
Nour Abbed (Nadia) Jazeem	Andrea Gabriel	1, 2, 3, 4, 5, 6
Nour Abbed Jazeem, a childhood friend of Sayid's, becomes involved in an insurgency opposed to Saddam Hussein. Nadia is imprisoned and interrogated by Sayid, but he lets her escape. She travels to the West, and in doing so comes in contact with both Charlie and Locke. When Sayid leaves the island, they get married, but shortly after she is murdered. In Season 6, when Sayid doesn't crash on the island, she is married to Sayid's brother. With him, she has two kids, a boy and a girl.
Jae Lee	Tony Lee	2, 3
After teaching Sun English, Jae Lee has an affair with her and as a result, her father sends Jin to kill him. Jin instead tells him to leave Korea forever, but Jae commits suicide by jumping from his apartment building.
Cassidy Phillips	Kim Dickens	2, 3, 5
Cassidy is a recently divorced woman whom Sawyer cons, even though he loves her. Cassidy then goes to Iowa and accidentally meets Kate. Cassidy later has Sawyer arrested and visits him in jail, where she tells him they have a daughter together - Clementine. After Kate returns from the Island, she tells Cassidy the truth about everything that happened on the Island and gives her some of her settlement money from Oceanic Airlines, in order for Kate to keep her promise she made to Sawyer, to look after Clementine.
Danielle Rousseau	Mira Furlan; Melissa Farman (younger)	1, 2, 3, 4, 5, 6
Danielle Rousseau is a member of a multi-national scientific research expedition whose boat breaks down and who become stranded on the island in 1988. She records a SOS message (in her native French) that continually repeats for 16 years, until the crash of Flight 815. Pregnant when she arrives on the island, and slowly becoming mad, she gives birth to Alex after killing her team because they had gotten "sick" as a result of contact with the monster, though Danielle later comes to blame the Others. Baby Alex is kidnapped soon after by the Others. Rousseau, having been found by Sayid living in seclusion, occasionally helps the Flight 815 survivors. She is shot and killed in an ambush along with Karl while leading Alex to the Temple on Ben's orders. In the fifth season, Jin, who has traveled back in time, meets Rousseau and her crew after he drifts to the Island on the wreckage of the exploded freighter.
Sarah Shephard	Julie Bowen	1, 2, 3
Sarah is involved in a car crash with Shannon's father. Jack performs surgery on her, but informs her that she will never walk again. However, she is miraculously healed. They fall in love and marry, but some time later, Sarah has an affair and divorces Jack. Sometime after the crash survivors are rescued, it is revealed she is pregnant.
Geronimo Jackson
Geronimo Jackson has been referenced in six episodes of Lost as well as in The Lost Experience. The producers of Lost have asserted that Geronimo Jackson was a genuine, but obscure, 1970s rock band, which released one album entitled Magna Carta. Aside from sources relating to Lost, there is no evidence for the existence of this band. A search of the US Patent and Trademark Office online database lists "Geronimo Jackson" as a word mark owned by Disney Enterprises, valid for all types of housewares, school supplies, stationery, etc. The mark was filed on January 22, 2009. In "The Hunting Party", a Geronimo Jackson album is found by Charlie and Hurley while they are going through all of the gramophone records in The Swan. The band is also referenced in the episodes "The Whole Truth", "Further Instructions", "This Place is Death", "LaFleur", on a poster in John Locke's locker in "Cabin Fever" and at Hurley's birthday party in "There's No Place Like Home". There is a Geronimo Jackson poster in the backgroup when Jack, Kate and Hurley are in the dining hall in He's Our You. A single on iTunes called "Dharma Lady" has surfaced by the band and appears as a song in the film Dear John. "Dharma Lady" was made available to players of the video game series Rock Band through the Rock Band Network, shortly after the airing of the Lost series finale. Geronimo Jackson is actually San Diego–based band, The Donkeys.

=== Minor recurring off-island characters ===
Name	Actor	Main character crossover(s)	Season(s)
Sam Austen	Lindsey Ginter	Kate's stepfather, Sayid's captor	2
Tom Brennan	Mackenzie Astin (adult); Tanner Maguire (child)	Kate's childhood sweetheart	1, 5
Dr. Douglas Brooks	Bruce Davison	Hurley's doctor	2, 6
Rachel Carlson	Robin Weigert (adult); Savannah Lathem (child)	Juliet's sister	3, 5
Teresa Cortez	Rachel Ticotin	Ana Lucia's mother and boss	2
Chrissy	Meilinda Soerjoko	Some crash survivors' ticket agent	1, 2
JD	John Dixon	Flight attendant in the Oceanic 815	1
Charlie Hume	Marvin DeFreitas	Desmond and Penny's son	5
Wayne Janssen	James Horan	Kate's biological father	2
Omer Jarrah	Cas Anvar (adult); Xavier Raabe-Manupule (child)	Sayid's brother	5, 6
Mary Jo	Brittany Perrineau	Sawyer's girlfriend, Hurley's lottery vendor	1
Mr. Kwon	John Shin	Jin's father, Sun's father-in-law	1, 3
Nurse Susie Lazenby	Grisel Toledo	Hurley's nurse	2, 4, 5, 6
Carole Littleton	Susan Duerden	Claire's mother, Aaron's grandmother	3, 4, 5
Lindsey Littleton	Gabrielle Fitzpatrick	Claire's aunt	2, 3
Susan Lloyd	Tamara Taylor	Michael's girlfriend, Walt's mother	1, 2
Emily Annabeth Locke	Swoosie Kurtz (adult); Holland Roden (teenager)	Locke's mother	1, 4
Richard Malkin	Nick Jameson	Claire's psychic, Mr. Eko's acquaintance	1, 2
Jason McCormack	Aaron Gold	Ana Lucia's attacker and later victim	2
Michael's mother	Starletta DuPois	Michael's mother, Walt's grandmother	4
Michelle	Michelle Arthur	Flight attendant in the Oceanic 815	1
Ray Mullens	Nick Tate	Employer of Kate's (later turns her in to Marshal Edward Mars)	1
Randy Nations	Billy Ray Gallion	Locke's supervisor, Hurley's former supervisor	1, 2, 3, 4, 6
Helen Norwood	Katey Sagal	Locke's former girlfriend	2, 6
Andrea (Nurse)	Julie Ow	Locke (nurse), Jack's co-worker	1
Liam Pace	Neil Hopkins (older), Zack Shada (younger)	Charlie's elder brother	1, 2, 3, 6
Megan Pace	Multiple	Charlie's mother	2
Simon Pace	Robin Atkin Downes, John Henry Canavan	Charlie's father	2, 3
Ji Yeon Kwon	Jaymie Kim	Sun and Jin's daughter	3, 4, 5, 6
Woo-Jung Paik	Byron Chung	Sun's father, Jin's employer and father-in-law	1, 3, 4
Mrs. Paik	June Kyoko Lu	Sun's mother	2, 4, 5
Carmen Reyes	Lillian Hurst	Hurley's mother	1, 2, 3, 4, 5, 6
David Reyes	Cheech Marin	Hurley's father	3, 4, 5
Adam Rutherford	Uncredited	Shannon's father, Boone's stepfather, Jack's patient and the perpetrator of his future wife's car accident	2
David Shephard	Dylan Minnette	Jack and Juliet's son in the flash-sideways	6
Margo Shephard	Veronica Hamel	Jack's mother	1, 4, 6
Marc Silverman	Zack Ward (older)	Jack's friend	1
Leonard Simms	Ron Bottitta	Hurley's friend	1, 2
Big Mike Walton	Michael Cudlitz	Ana Lucia's partner, Hurley's interrogator	2, 4
Yemi	Adetokumboh M'Cormack	Mr. Eko's brother	2, 3
Kevin Callis	Nathan Fillion	Kate's husband	3

== Reception ==
Entertainment Weekly praised the show's fourth season for its "captivating minor characters (tortured Sayid, scheming Juliet, savvy Ben)". In May 2006, McFarlane Toys announced recurring lines of character action figures and released the first series in November 2006, with the second series being released July 2007.
