= List of Lost cast members =

Lost is an American television drama that debuted on the American Broadcasting Company (ABC) on September 22, 2004. The series aired for six seasons, and follows the survivors of the crash of the fictional Oceanic Flight 815 on a mysterious tropical island somewhere in the South Pacific. Although a large cast made Lost more expensive to produce, the writers benefited from added flexibility in story decisions. According to series executive producer Bryan Burk, "You can have more interactions between characters and create more diverse characters, more back stories, more love triangles." The initial season had 14 regular speaking roles that received star billing. Matthew Fox played the protagonist, a troubled surgeon named Jack Shephard. Evangeline Lilly portrayed a fugitive Kate Austen. Jorge Garcia played Hugo "Hurley" Reyes, an unlucky lottery winner. Josh Holloway played a con man, James "Sawyer" Ford. Ian Somerhalder played Boone Carlyle, chief operating officer of his mother's wedding business. Maggie Grace played his stepsister Shannon Rutherford, a former dance teacher. Harold Perrineau portrayed construction worker and aspiring artist Michael Dawson, while Malcolm David Kelley played his young son, Walt Lloyd. Terry O'Quinn played the mysterious John Locke. Naveen Andrews portrayed former Iraqi Republican Guard Sayid Jarrah. Emilie de Ravin played a young Australian mother-to-be, Claire Littleton. Yunjin Kim played Sun-Hwa Kwon, the daughter of a powerful Korean businessman and mobster, with Daniel Dae Kim as her husband and father's enforcer Jin-Soo Kwon. Dominic Monaghan played English ex-rock star drug addict Charlie Pace.

Boone was written out near the end of season one, and Kelley became a guest star making occasional appearances throughout season two. Shannon's departure eight episodes into season two made way for newcomers Mr. Eko, a Nigerian fake Catholic priest and former criminal played by Adewale Akinnuoye-Agbaje; Ana Lucia Cortez, an airport security guard and former police officer played by Michelle Rodriguez; and Libby Smith, a purported clinical psychologist and formerly mentally ill woman portrayed by Cynthia Watros. In season three, two actors were promoted from recurring to starring roles: Henry Ian Cusick as former Scottish soldier Desmond Hume, and Michael Emerson as the manipulative leader of the Others, Ben Linus. In addition, three new actors joined the regular cast: Elizabeth Mitchell, as fertility doctor and Other Juliet Burke, and Kiele Sanchez and Rodrigo Santoro as background survivor couple Nikki Fernandez and Paulo. Several characters died throughout the season; Eko was written out early on when Akinnuoye-Agbaje did not wish to continue on the show, Nikki and Paulo were buried alive mid-season after poor fan response, and Charlie was written out in the third-season finale. Jeremy Davies as Daniel Faraday, a nervous physicist who takes a scientific interest in the island; Ken Leung as Miles Straume, a sarcastic supposed ghost whisperer, and Rebecca Mader as Charlotte Staples Lewis, a hard-headed and determined anthropologist and successful academic joined the cast in season four.

Numerous supporting characters have been given expansive and recurring appearances in the progressive storyline. Danielle Rousseau (Mira Furlan), a French member of an earlier scientific expedition to the island first encountered as a voice recording in the pilot episode, appears throughout the series; she is searching for her daughter, who later turns up in the form of Alex Rousseau (Tania Raymonde). Cindy (Kimberley Joseph), an Oceanic flight attendant who first appeared in the pilot, survived the crash and subsequently became one of the Others. In the second season, married couple Rose Henderson (L. Scott Caldwell) and Bernard Nadler (Sam Anderson), separated on opposite sides of the island (she with the main characters, he with the tail section survivors) were featured in a flashback episode after being reunited. Corporate magnate Charles Widmore (Alan Dale) has connections to both Ben and Desmond. Desmond is in love with Widmore's daughter Penelope "Penny" Widmore (Sonya Walger). The introduction of the Others featured Tom aka Mr. Friendly (M. C. Gainey) and Ethan Rom (William Mapother) all of whom have been shown in both flashbacks and the ongoing story. Jack's father Christian Shephard (John Terry) has appeared in multiple flashbacks of various characters. In the third season, Naomi Dorrit (Marsha Thomason), parachutes onto the island, the team leader of a group hired by Widmore to find Ben Linus. One member of her team includes the ruthless mercenary Martin Keamy (Kevin Durand). In the finale episode "The End", recurring guest stars Sam Anderson, L. Scott Caldwell, Francois Chau, Fionnula Flanagan, Sonya Walger, and John Terry were credited under the "starring" rubric alongside the principal cast. The mysterious, black, smoke cloud-like entity known as "the Monster" appeared in human form during season five and six as a middle-aged man dressed in black robes known as "The Man in Black" played by Titus Welliver, and in season six, it appears in the form of John Locke played by O'Quinn in a dual role. His rival, Jacob, was played by Mark Pellegrino.

== Appearances ==
Key
Main	Indicates the actor was a member of the main cast in multiple episodes during the season.
Main - "The End"	Indicates the actor had a starring role only in episode "The End" during the season.
Recurring	Indicates the actor had a guest role in multiple episodes during the season.
Guest	Indicates the actor appeared in one episode during the season, or had a guest role in multiple episodes and credit as "Special guest star".
Archive	Indicates the actor appeared in archival footage only.
	Indicates the actor did not appear during the season.

Actor	Character	Seasons					
Actor	Character	Season 1 (2004–05)	Season 2 (2005–06)	Season 3 (2006–07)	Season 4 (2008)	Season 5 (2009)	Season 6 (2010)
Main cast
Naveen Andrews	Sayid Jarrah	Main	Main	Main	Main	Main	Main
Emilie de Ravin	Claire Littleton	Main	Main	Main	Main	Archive	Main
Matthew Fox	Jack Shephard	Main	Main	Main	Main	Main	Main
Jorge Garcia	Hugo Reyes	Main	Main	Main	Main	Main	Main
Maggie Grace	Shannon Rutherford	Main	Main	Special Guest			Main - "The End"
Josh Holloway	James Ford	Main	Main	Main	Main	Main	Main
Malcolm David Kelley	Walt Lloyd^{[b]}	Main	Recurring	Special Guest	Recurring	Guest	Guest
Daniel Dae Kim	Jin-Soo Kwon	Main	Main	Main	Main	Main	Main
Yunjin Kim	Sun-Hwa Kwon	Main	Main	Main	Main	Main	Main
Evangeline Lilly	Kate Austen	Main	Main	Main	Main	Main	Main
Dominic Monaghan	Charlie Pace	Main	Main	Main	Guest		Main - "The End"
Terry O'Quinn	John Locke^{[b]}	Main	Main	Main	Main	Main	Main
Harold Perrineau	Michael Dawson	Main	Main		Main		Guest
Ian Somerhalder	Boone Carlyle	Main	Special Guest	Special Guest			Main - "The End"
Michelle Rodriguez	Ana Lucia Cortez	Guest	Main			Special Guest	Guest
Adewale Akinnuoye-Agbaje	Mr. Eko		Main	Main			
Cynthia Watros	Libby Smith		Main		Guest		Main - "The End"
Henry Ian Cusick	Desmond Hume		Recurring	Main	Main	Main	Main
Michael Emerson	Ben Linus		Recurring	Main	Main	Main	Main
Elizabeth Mitchell	Juliet Burke			Main	Main	Main	Main - "The End"
Kiele Sanchez	Nikki Fernandez			Main	Archive		
Rodrigo Santoro	Paulo			Main			
Nestor Carbonell	Richard Alpert			Recurring	Recurring	Recurring	Main
Jeremy Davies	Daniel Faraday				Main	Main	Main - "The End"
Ken Leung	Miles Straume				Main	Main	Main
Rebecca Mader	Charlotte Lewis				Main	Main	Main - "The End"
Jeff Fahey	Frank Lapidus				Recurring	Recurring	Main
Zuleikha Robinson	Ilana Verdansky					Recurring	Main
Actor	Character	Seasons					
Actor	Character	Season 1 (2004–05)	Season 2 (2005–06)	Season 3 (2006–07)	Season 4 (2008)	Season 5 (2009)	Season 6 (2010)
Recurring cast
Michelle Arthur	Michelle	Recurring					
William Blanchette	Aaron Littleton	Recurring	Recurring	Recurring	Recurring	Recurring	Recurring
Ron Bottitta	Leonard Simms	Guest	Guest				
Julie Bowen	Sarah Shephard	Guest	Recurring	Recurring			
Wendy Braun	Gina	Recurring					
Beth Broderick	Diane Janssen	Guest	Recurring	Guest	Guest		
L. Scott Caldwell	Rose Nadler	Recurring	Recurring	Recurring	Recurring	Recurring	Main - "The End"
Byron Chung	Woo-Jung Paik	Guest		Recurring	Guest		
Jon Dixon	JD	Recurring					
Mira Furlan	Danielle Rousseau	Recurring	Recurring	Recurring	Recurring		Guest
Robert Frederick	Jeff	Recurring					
Andrea Gabriel	Nadia Jazeem	Guest	Guest	Guest	Recurring	Guest	Recurring
Billy Ray Gallion	Randy Nations	Guest	Guest	Guest	Guest		Guest
M. C. Gainey	Tom Friendly	Guest	Recurring	Recurring	Recurring		
Greg Grunberg	Seth Norris	Guest					Guest
Veronica Hamel	Margo Shephard	Guest			Guest		Guest
Neil Hopkins	Liam Pace	Guest	Guest	Guest			Recurring
Lillian Hurst	Carmen Reyes	Guest	Guest	Guest	Guest	Guest	Guest
Nick Jameson	Richard Malkin	Guest	Guest				
Kimberley Joseph	Cindy Chandler	Recurring	Recurring	Recurring			Recurring
Fredric Lehne	Edward Mars	Recurring	Guest	Recurring			Recurring
William Mapother	Ethan Rom	Recurring	Guest	Recurring		Guest	Guest
Julie Ow	Nurse	Guest		Guest			
Brittany Perrineau	Mary Jo	Recurring	Guest				
Daniel Roebuck	Dr. Leslie Artz	Recurring		Guest			Recurring
Mark Rusden	Airport cop	Recurring					
John Shin	Mr. Kwon	Guest		Guest			
Meilinda Soerjoko	Chrissy	Recurring	Guest				
Tamara Taylor	Susan Lloyd	Guest	Guest				
John Terry	Christian Shephard^{[b]}	Recurring	Recurring	Recurring	Recurring	Recurring	Main - "The End"
Kevin Tighe	Anthony Cooper	Guest	Recurring	Recurring			Guest
Sam Anderson	Bernard Nadler		Recurring	Recurring	Recurring	Recurring	Main - "The End"
Michael Bowen	Danny Pickett		Recurring	Recurring			
Clancy Brown	Kelvin Inman		Recurring				
François Chau	Pierre Chang		Recurring	Recurring	Guest	Recurring	Main - "The End"
Michael Cudlitz	Mike Walton		Guest		Guest		
Brett Cullen	Goodwin Stanhope		Guest	Recurring'	Guest		
Alan Dale	Charles Widmore		Guest	Guest	Recurring	Recurring	Recurring
Bruce Davison	Douglas Brooks		Guest				Guest
Kim Dickens	Cassidy Phillips		Guest	Recurring		Guest	
David Ely	Intern		Recurring				
Gabrielle Fitzpatrick	Lindsey Littleton		Guest	Guest			
Dustin Geiger	Matthew		Recurring	Recurring			
Lindsey Ginter	Sam Austen		Recurring				
April Grace	Bea Klugh		Recurring	Guest			
Mickey Graue	Zach		Guest	Recurring			Recurring
Kiersten Havelock	Emma		Guest	Recurring			Recurring
Lawrence Jones	Lead soldier		Guest	Guest			
Tony Lee	Jae Lee		Recurring	Guest			
Tomiko Okhee Lee	Mrs. Lee		Guest	Guest			
June Kyoto Lu	Mrs. Paik		Guest		Guest	Guest	
Adetokumboh M'Cormack	Yemi^{[b]}		Recurring	Guest			
Kolawolfe Obileye Jr	Mr. Eko^{[c]}		Guest	Guest			
Olekan Obileye	Yemi^{[c]}		Guest	Guest			
Alex Petrovitch	Henrik		Guest		Guest		
Tania Raymonde	Alex Rousseau^{[b]}		Recurring	Recurring	Recurring	Guest	Recurring
Katey Sagal	Helen Norwood		Recurring				Recurring
Jeremy Shada	Charlie Pace^{[c]}		Guest	Guest			
Zack Shada	Liam Pace^{[c]}		Guest	Guest			
Rachel Ticotin	Teresa Cortez		Recurring				
Grisel Toledo	Susie Lazenby		Guest		Guest	Guest	Guest
Sonya Walger	Penny Widmore		Recurring	Recurring	Recurring	Recurring	Main - "The End"
Teddy Wells	Ivan		Recurring	Recurring			
Blake Bashoff	Karl Martin			Recurring	Recurring		
Sterling Beaumon	Ben Linus^{[c]}			Guest		Recurring	
Joah Buley	Luke			Recurring			
Esmond Chung	Paik's associate			Guest	Guest		
Andrew Divoff	Mikhail Bakunin			Recurring			Guest
Fionnula Flanagan	Eloise Hawking			Guest		Recurring	Main - "The End"
Brian Goodman	Ryan Pryce			Recurring			
Ariston Green	Jason			Recurring			
Jon Gries	Roger Linus			Guest		Recurring	Guest
Doug Hutchison	Horace Goodspeed			Guest	Guest	Recurring	
Suzanne Krull	Lynn Karnoff			Guest			Guest
Paula Malcolmson	Colleen Pickett			Recurring			
Cheech Marin	David Reyes			Guest	Guest	Guest	
Rob McElhenney	Aldo			Guest			Guest
Tracy Middendorf	Bonnie			Recurring			
Lana Parrilla	Greta			Recurring			
Marsha Thomason	Naomi Dorrit			Recurring	Recurring	Guest	
Robin Weigert	Rachel Carlson			Recurring			
Anthony Azizi	Omar				Recurring		Recurring
Zoë Bell	Regina				Recurring		
Grant Bowler	Gault				Recurring		
Susan Duerden	Carole Littleton				Guest	Recurring	
Starletta DuPois	Mrs. Dawson				Recurring		
Kevin Durand	Martin Keamy				Recurring		Recurring
Jill Kuramoto	Female anchor				Recurring		
Lance Reddick	Matthew Abaddon				Recurring	Guest	
Fisher Stevens	George Minkowski				Recurring		Guest
Marc Vann	Ray				Recurring		
Matthew Allan	Cunningham					Recurring	
Reiko Aylesworth	Amy Goodspeed					Recurring	
Brad Berryhill	Anxious guy					Recurring	
Bruno Bruni	Brennan					Recurring	
Kevin Chapman	Mitch					Recurring	
Tom Connolly	Charles Widmore^{[c]}					Recurring	
Guillaume Dabinpons	Robert					Recurring	
Marvin DeFreitas	Charlie Hume					Recurring	
Michael Dempsey	Foreman					Recurring	
Alice Evans	Eloise Hawking^{[c]}					Recurring	
Melissa Farman	Danielle Rousseau^{[c]}					Recurring	
Sarah Farooqui	Theresa Spencer					Recurring	
Patrick Fischler	Phil					Recurring	
Brad William Henke	Bram					Recurring	Guest
Maya Henssens	Charlotte Lewis^{[c]}					Recurring	
Tom Irwin	Dan Norton					Recurring	
Leslie Ishii	Lara Chang					Recurring	
Eric Lange	Stuart Radzinsky					Recurring	
David S. Lee	Charles Widmore^{[c]}					Recurring	
Sven Lindstrom	Crew member					Recurring	
William Makozak	Captain Bird					Recurring	
Mary Mara	Jill					Recurring	
Molly McGivern	Rosie					Recurring	
Marc Menard	Montand					Recurring	
Mark Pellegrino	Jacob					Recurring	Recurring
Sebastian Siegel	Erik					Recurring	
Saïd Taghmaoui	Caesar					Recurring	
Titus Welliver	Man in Black					Recurring	Recurring
Sean Whalen	Neil "Frogurt"					Recurring	Recurring
Dayo Ade	Justin						Recurring
Steve Boatright	Mike						Recurring
John Hawkes	Lennon						Recurring
Fred Koehler	Seamus						Recurring
Sheila Kelley	Zoe						Recurring
David H. Lawrence XVII	Taxi driver						Recurring
Dylan Minnette	David Shephard						Recurring
Hiroyuki Sanada	Dogen						Recurring

== Notes ==
- A Anderson, Caldwell, Chau, Davies, Flanagan, Grace, Mader, Mitchell, Monaghan, Somerhalder, Terry, Walger and Watros are credited as starring in the series finale "The End".
- B Kelley, M'Cormack, O'Quinn, Raymonde and Terry also portray the Monster taking the form of their character.
- C Beaumon, Connolly, Evans, Farman, Henssens, Lee, Obileye, Obileye Jr., Shada and Shada portray younger versions of characters.
- D Toledo's role is named Nurse Tyra in season six's "Happily Ever After".
