= What They Died For =

- Lost episode
- Episode no.: Season 6 Episode 16
- Directed by: Paul Edwards
- Written by: Edward Kitsis; Adam Horowitz; Elizabeth Sarnoff
- Production code: 616
- Original air date: May 18, 2010
- Running time: 43 minutes

Guest appearances
- Mark Pellegrino as Jacob; Alan Dale as Charles Widmore; Michelle Rodriguez as Ana Lucia Cortez; Mira Furlan as Danielle Rousseau; Tania Raymonde as Alex; Dylan Minnette as David Shephard; Sheila Kelley as Zoe; Kenton Duty as Young Jacob; Wendy Pearson as Nurse Kim Kondracki; Ashlee Kyker as Kid; Ernesto Lopez as Police officer

Episode chronology
← Previous "Across the Sea"	Next → "The End"
- Lost season 6

"What They Died For" is the 16th and penultimate episode of the American serial drama series Lost, and 119th and penultimate episode overall. The episode aired on May 18, 2010, on ABC in the United States. The episode's flash-sideways are centered on Jack Shephard, Desmond Hume, Benjamin Linus and James "Sawyer" Ford.

In the flash-sideways timeline, Desmond Hume (Henry Ian Cusick) continues his attempt to gather all the passengers of Oceanic Airlines Flight 815. In 2007, The Man in Black (Terry O'Quinn) devises a new strategy. Jack Shephard (Matthew Fox) takes the role as leader of the island while he and his group search for Desmond.

== Plot ==
=== 2004 (flash-sideways timeline) ===
Jack Shephard (Matthew Fox), Claire Littleton (Emilie de Ravin), and David Shephard (Dylan Minnette) eat breakfast and discuss David's participation in a concert that night. Jack is notified that Oceanic Airlines have found Christian Shephard's coffin; unbeknownst to him, this is a ruse planned by Desmond Hume (Henry Ian Cusick).

Outside the school where he and John Locke (Terry O'Quinn) work, Ben Linus (Michael Emerson) sees and confronts Desmond, who beats him while explaining that his intent was to make Locke "let go". Ben experiences flashes of Desmond beating him in the original universe. Ben relates all this to Locke, who goes to see Jack at the hospital and decides to have the new procedure; he believes his experiences with Desmond and Jack have been fated.

Alex's (Tania Raymonde) mother, Danielle Rousseau (Mira Furlan), offers the visibly injured Ben a ride home. She invites him to dinner, where Rousseau tells Ben that he has become like a father to Alex since her real father's death.

Desmond enters James "Sawyer" Ford (Josh Holloway) and Miles Straume's (Ken Leung) police station, confesses to assaulting Locke and Ben, and is jailed alongside Kate Austen (Evangeline Lilly) and Sayid Jarrah (Naveen Andrews). The three prisoners are to be transported by van, but the driver, Ana Lucia Cortez (Michelle Rodriguez), releases them and receives a payoff from Desmond and Hugo "Hurley" Reyes (Jorge Garcia). Desmond hands Kate a dress and tells her they are going to a concert.

=== 2007 (original timeline) ===
After the submarine explosion, (Note: Shown in "The Candidate".) Jack, Kate, Hurley, and Sawyer wash ashore, alive. Jack determines they must find Desmond, whose importance is revealed by the Man in Black's (Terry O'Quinn) attempt to kill him. A younger Jacob (Kenton Duty) confronts Hurley, demanding his body's ashes. Hurley gives them to him, and Jacob leaves without answering any of Hurley's questions. Hurley chases him to a campfire, where the adult Jacob (Mark Pellegrino) instructs him to bring the others before the campfire burns out, which will end his ability to manifest as he poured his ashes into the fire. They arrive in time, and are all able to see Jacob for the first time. He explains that they were chosen to come to the island because each of them has an emptiness that can be filled by the island, and that one of them must choose to be the guardian who will protect the light, the "heart" of the island, from the Man in Black. Jack volunteers; Jacob gives Jack a drink of water and declares that Jack is "now like [him]".

Ben, Miles, and Richard Alpert (Nestor Carbonell) reach the destroyed Barracks of the DHARMA Initiative. Ben enters the secret room where he was previously seen summoning the smoke monster to retrieve a stack of C4 he hid there. He plans to use it to destroy the Ajira airplane and prevent the Man in Black's escape. Charles Widmore (Alan Dale) and Zoe (Sheila Kelley) confront Ben, and Charles claims to be the group's only hope. Zoe and Widmore hide when the Man in Black arrives, while Miles flees. The smoke monster, the Man in Black, attacks Richard. As Locke, he demands Widmore's location from Ben, who reveals it. The Man in Black kills Zoe when it becomes clear she will not talk, then threatens to harm Penny unless Widmore reveals his purpose on the island. Widmore whispers a response, but Ben shoots and kills him to deny him the opportunity to save his daughter. The Man in Black claims to have already gotten the information he wanted, and leaves with Ben.

The two later find that Desmond has apparently escaped the well by climbing a rope. However, the Man in Black says this will not prevent him from using what he learned from Widmore: he can use Desmond's resistance to electromagnetism to destroy the island.

== Production ==
The episode was shown for approximately 1800 people at UCLA's Royce Hall on May 13, 2010 as a fundraiser for scholarships for the Colburn School of Performing Arts. It was written by executive producers Edward Kitsis, Adam Horowitz and Elizabeth Sarnoff and directed by Paul Edwards.

== Reception ==
=== Ratings and viewership ===
1.87 million Canadians watched this episode. 10.17 million American viewers watched this episode, the highest viewed episode since "The Package".

=== Critical reception ===
The episode received critical acclaim. Review aggregate website Metacritic gave the episode a score of 89 out of 100, indicating "Universal Acclaim". Both Cindy McLennan and Sam McPherson of Television Without Pity and TV Overmind, respectively, gave the episode a perfect score. Chris Carabott of IGN gave the episode a score of 9.4, naming the episode "A fantastic setup for the series finale." Noel Murray of The A.V. Club stated "It was funny at times, poignant at times, shocking at times, and it made the overall picture a little bit clearer. And I especially liked the way the tone shifted as the episode progressed." In total, he gave the episode the score of 91. Emily VanDerWerff of Los Angeles Times gave the episode a score of 90, stating, "What They Died For is a lot of things. It's a fantastic episode of "Lost," one that moves like a rocket. It's a big, relatively well-handled infodump that makes sure we know how everything and everyone fits into the big picture, mostly." Jeff Jensen of Entertainment Weekly gave the episode the score of 80, saying that it was "A set-up episode, albeit an extremely entertaining one."
