= Everybody Loves Hugo =

- Lost episode
- Hugo "Hurley" Reyes (Jorge Garcia) sees Michael Dawson's (Harold Perrineau) ghost
- Episode no.: Season 6 Episode 12
- Directed by: Dan Attias
- Written by: Edward Kitsis; Adam Horowitz
- Production code: 612
- Original air date: April 13, 2010
- Running time: 42 minutes

Guest appearances
- Harold Perrineau as Michael Dawson; François Chau as Dr. Pierre Chang; Lillian Hurst as Carmen Reyes; Bruce Davison as Dr. Douglas Brooks; Archie Ahuna as Tito Reyes; Cynthia Watros as Libby Smith; Samm Levine as Clerk; Kenton Duty as Young Jacob; Jesse Smith as Waiter

Episode chronology
← Previous "Happily Ever After"	Next → "The Last Recruit"
- Lost season 6

"Everybody Loves Hugo" is the 12th television episode of the American Broadcasting Company's sixth season of the serial drama television series Lost and 115th episode overall. The episode was aired on April 13, 2010, on ABC in the United States. The episode was written by executive producers Edward Kitsis & Adam Horowitz and directed by Dan Attias, who previously directed the first-season episode "Numbers". The title alludes to the season two episode "Everybody Hates Hugo." The episode is centered on Hugo "Hurley" Reyes, while Desmond Hume and John Locke also received points of view in the flash-sideways universe.

In 2007, Hugo "Hurley" Reyes (Jorge Garcia) starts to think destroying Ajira Airways Flight 316 is a bad idea. Meanwhile, Desmond Hume (Henry Ian Cusick) arrives at the Man in Black's (Terry O'Quinn) camp. In the flash-sideways, Desmond encourages Hurley to believe Libby Smith's (Cynthia Watros) visions of the other timeline.

== Plot ==
=== 2004 (flash-sideways timeline) ===
Hugo "Hurley" Reyes (Jorge Garcia) is a successful businessman and philanthropist. His mother sets him up on a blind date, but instead of his intended date, he meets Libby Smith (Cynthia Watros), who tells him that they already know one another. Libby is led away by her doctor (Bruce Davison), who explains that she is a resident at a psychiatric institution and has wandered away from a group trip. Later, Hurley meets Desmond Hume (Henry Ian Cusick), who encourages him to believe Libby, and to find out why she thinks she knows him already. Hurley then visits the Santa Rosa Mental Health Institute, where Libby tells him that she remembers them meeting following a plane crash on an island. Hurley is unable to remember, but asks her on a date regardless. They share a picnic, and when Libby kisses him, Hurley begins to remember. Desmond observes their date from a distance, before driving off and visiting the school at which Ben Linus (Michael Emerson) and John Locke (Terry O'Quinn) teach. Desmond sees Locke in his wheelchair, and after a short conversation with Ben, he runs Locke over with his car and drives off.

=== 2007 (original timeline) ===
While visiting Libby's grave, Hurley is visited by Michael Dawson (Harold Perrineau), who warns him that if the group follows through with their plan to blow up the plane on Hydra Island, many people will die and it will be Hurley's fault. Ilana (Zuleikha Robinson) collects four sticks of dynamite from the Black Rock. As Hurley voices his concern, Ilana puts down her bag containing the unstable dynamite too hard, causing it to explode, killing her. Richard Alpert (Nestor Carbonell) leads the group to collect more dynamite. Hurley sneaks off ahead of them and blows up the Black Rock, destroying the dynamite supply, as well as the ship. He claims that Jacob has appeared to him and told him to take the group to The Man in Black. Richard does not believe him, and remains intent on destroying the plane. He takes Ben and Miles (Ken Leung) with him to the Barracks to collect explosives, while Jack (Matthew Fox), Frank (Jeff Fahey) and Sun (Yunjin Kim) remain with Hurley. Hurley confesses to Jack that he did not really see Jacob, but Jack says he already knows, and is willing to follow Hurley anyway. The group hears whispers from the jungle, and Michael appears again, explaining that the whispers are the voices of deceased island inhabitants who are unable to move on. He apologizes to Hurley for killing Libby.

Meanwhile, Sayid presents Desmond to The Man in Black, who takes him to an old well. The Man in Black explains to Desmond that people built wells looking for the source that made compass needles spin at points like this location. The Man in Black then throws Desmond down the well. Upon returning to his camp, Hurley's group arrives to talk to the Man in Black.

== Reception ==
"Everybody Loves Hugo" was met with positive reviews. Review aggregate website Metacritic gave the episode a score of 83 out of 100, indicating "Universal Acclaim". The score was down on the previous week's score of 93. IGN.com's Chris Carabott says that the flashsideways "appear that things are finally coming together." He has been waiting for Ilana's "big moment", and that her death "was a good enough reason" for him. Overall, he gave the episode a score of 8.1/10.
