= Mythology of Lost =

Lore of American TV series

The television series Lost includes a number of mysterious elements that have been ascribed to science fiction or supernatural phenomena, usually concerning coincidences, synchronicity, déjà vu, temporal and spatial anomalies, paradoxes, and other puzzling phenomena. The creators of the series refer to these as part of the mythology of the series.

== The Island ==
As the main setting of the series, the island boasts a number of unusual properties. Its location changes at times and it cannot be reached by ordinary means. The island is surrounded by some sort of barrier which causes disruptions in the normal flow of time for those who cross it. Electromagnetic phenomena are common on the island, and it seems to bestow unusual healing properties to some of its residents.

=== Structures ===
==== The Black Rock ====
Located deep inside the jungle is the Black Rock, a sailing ship from the mid-19th century. In "Ab Aeterno", the Black Rock set sail in 1867 and was captained by Magnus Hanso and had Richard Alpert, a Spaniard by the name of Ricardo, as a prisoner. Jacob, the protector of the island, does not deny when asked by his fraternal twin brother if he brought the ship to the island, as the two watch it approaching. Eventually, it is swept inland by a colossal rogue wave, destroying all but one foot of the coastal statue of Taweret on its way, but a mystery remains as to how the Black Rock had landed on almost the other side of the Island from where the statue of Taweret was. In "The Constant", it is explained that the Black Rock set sail from Portsmouth, England, on March 22, 1845 on a trading mission to the Kingdom of Siam, when she was tragically lost at sea. The only known artifact of this journey is the journal of the ship's First Mate, which was discovered seven years later among the artifacts of pirates on Île Sainte-Marie, Madagascar. The contents of this journal have never been made public nor known to anyone outside the family of the seller Tovard Hanso. This journal is later bought at auction by Charles Widmore.

In "Exodus", John Locke mentions that this ship must have been en route to a mining colony, probably set-off from the Eastern Coast of Africa, Mozambique. The ship contains dynamite, mining equipment and several chained skeletons, which are revealed to be enslaved people carried by the ship. Dr. Leslie Arzt (Daniel Roebuck) mentions that a tsunami could have swept it a couple miles inland as seen later in the episode. The Swan's blast door map has a revision marking "Known Final Resting Place of Magnus Hanso / Black Rock" as seen in "Live Together, Die Alone".

==== The cabin ====
The cabin was built by the Dharma Initiative mathematician Horace Goodspeed as a sort of retreat for himself and his wife. It is surrounded by a broken ash circle. While at first it is believed that Jacob resides there, it is actually the Man in Black in the cabin, falsely giving orders on behalf of Jacob. The cabin has appeared in three separate locations.

==== The lighthouse ====
In "Lighthouse", Jacob instructs Hurley to take Jack to a heretofore-unseen lighthouse on the Island's coast. At the top of the lighthouse's stone tower is a set of mirrors which can rotate via a large stone dial, labeled with numbers and in some cases the names of the "candidates". Jack is able to see an image of his childhood home reflected in the mirrors when they are turned to his number, 23; whether this is due to some property of the lighthouse mirrors and structure or simply to Jacob's influence is unclear.

==== The ruins ====
There are ruins on the Island, many with hieroglyphs. In "Live Together, Die Alone", while at sea, Sayid, Jin, and Sun sight the remnants of a massive statue standing upon a rock in the surf. All that is left is a large, four-toed marble foot broken off at the ankle. It has been compared to the Colossus of Rhodes. The full statue, viewed from the back, appears from a distance in the fifth-season episode "LaFleur". The statue seen from behind has lion-like ears, a crown on the head, long hair, an ankh in each hand, and ancient Egyptian dress. The statue is named Taweret, the Egyptian god of fertility and life.

At the base of the statue is a secret chamber in which Jacob resides. All four elements of earth, water, fire, and air are represented in this chamber. "The fire pit in the middle of the room consisted of flames rising from black sand with a ring of water surrounding all of it." The room also housed a weaving loom in which Jacob is shown creating a tapestry. In addition, painted on the ceiling was "an ancient Egyptian astronomical chart which refers to the stars and planets, time, and the goddess Taweret."

Further ruins are revealed in "The Brig" when the Others tie Locke's father to the broken base of a large, stone column. Toward the end of the third season, Ben tells Richard to continue leading the rest of the Others to the Temple, and in "Meet Kevin Johnson" he sends Alex, Karl, and Rousseau to the same location. His map marks it with a Dharma Initiative symbol, but the Temple has also been mentioned as something the Monster is in place to protect. In addition, in "The Shape of Things to Come", after Alex is killed, Ben summons the Smoke Monster in a secret chamber hidden in his closet whose stone door contains hieroglyphics. In "There's No Place Like Home Pt 3", when Ben enters the Orchid Station, behind the official Dharma built station, he finds what appear to be ancient tombstones covered with unknown hieroglyphs on his way to the final room, where an ancient man-made wheel rests that is used to "move the island". The fifth-season episode "This Place is Death" shows a better view of what appears to be the Temple that Ben will one day order Richard to lead his people to. In this episode the temple is directly guarded by the Monster. In "Whatever Happened, Happened", Richard Alpert is seen taking a young Benjamin Linus inside the temple, as a means of healing a fatal gunshot wound. Alpert notes beforehand that Ben will emerge a fundamentally different person. It is revealed in "Dead is Dead" that the structure the viewers see is merely a wall concealing the temple and the actual temple itself is a mile away on the other side of the wall.

There is also a labyrinth of tunnels beneath the surface of the Island. The lair of the Monster lies in these tunnels, beneath the site of the Temple wall, and another chamber was used by the Others to isolate a hydrogen bomb with a breach in its casing, which lies beneath the Dharma Initiative barracks. Some of these tunnels are marked on the blast door map in the Swan Station.

In the sixth-season episode "Across the Sea", young Jacob and his unnamed fraternal twin brother are shown a cave with a waterfall; in "The End," Desmond descends into the cave and discovers an ancient chamber. In the chamber there is a pool of electromagnetic energy with a large hieroglyphic stone that sits at the center covering a mysterious hole. When it is removed by Desmond, the water and energy drain from the pool, an infernal red glow infuses the chamber, and the island begins to violently react. When Jack returns the stone, the water begins to flow into the pool again and the electromagnetic energy returns.

=== Health-related properties ===
The Island has extraordinary healing properties. The Island can heal normally untreatable conditions, such as spinal damage (Locke), cancer (Rose), and infertility (Jin). Injuries heal much faster than they normally would, though by no means are people incapable of dying. Disease is also possible, though rare. Since "the Incident", increased electromagnetic immersion caused women who conceive children on the Island to die of an auto-immune condition during the second trimester of pregnancy. They can otherwise give birth as long as conception occurs off the island or if they leave before the second trimester.

==== Healing ====
Some castaways express the belief that they have been miraculously healed since the crash. Prior to his arrival, Locke was paralyzed, but he regains the use of his legs immediately after the crash. Richard Alpert says in "The Brig" that Locke's spine healing itself is not a normal event, even by the Island's standards. It is a sign of Locke being somehow "special". The effects of this specialness seem to extend to other people. After his spinal surgery, Ben is paralyzed for over a week, but regains the feeling in his legs immediately after coming into contact with Locke. He is able to walk (with the aid of a cane) only days later.

The Others appear to operate on the assumption that cancer is impossible on the Island ("One of Us"). Ben Linus appears deeply shocked when told he has a tumor on his spine, and Juliet notes the coincidence that Jack, a spinal surgeon, arrived on the island two days after Ben's condition was diagnosed. Similarly, Rose had been dying of cancer before crashing on the island. After the crash, she feels as if the cancer has "left her body" and, in "S.O.S.", credits her cure to the island. Jack contracts appendicitis while on the Island, which Rose observes is suspicious given that they expect their imminent rescue and the fact that she strongly believes that it is impossible to get sick on the Island.

Locke also makes a miraculously fast recovery in the episode "Through the Looking Glass", after being shot and left for dead by Ben in the episode "The Man Behind the Curtain". Locke also comments that he would have died from being shot, had the kidney Ben was aiming for not been removed earlier in his life. In the episode "Lockdown", his legs are crushed by the Swan station's blast doors. Rose teases Locke later when he is depressed about possibly being immobile, saying that he will recover sooner than he should. In "Because You Left", Locke gets shot in the leg by Ethan when he is flashed to the past. After Locke gets flashed to the present day, Richard briefly treats his wound and tells him "the island will do the rest."

Other characters like Mikhail Bakunin and Naomi also recover from injuries very fast. Shannon suffers an asthma attack and is in a panic, having lost her inhaler, until Sun recommends herbs from her garden.

In "The Variable", Daniel Faraday is shown to have suffered severe mental damage as a result of his experiments in temporal displacement, impairing his long-term memory. Charles Widmore promises Faraday that he will be healed if he goes on the freighter mission he was recruiting him for. Upon his arrival on the island, Daniel is cured of these problems, although he did suffer a temporary relapse after the death of Charlotte.

==== Pregnancy ====
The third season reveals that any woman who conceives on the island dies before the baby is born. Specifically, the pregnancy goes well until about midway through the second trimester, when complications arise. The mother's body rejects the fetus as a viral infection, resulting in both the mother and child's death. Juliet states that in her research, no one made it to their third trimester. Animals such as the wild boars do not die during pregnancy. Women who went through their second trimester off the island are able to give birth without incident (Rousseau, Claire). The Others have enlisted the help of Juliet, a fertility researcher, to help find out why this happens, but she never finds an answer. Several women among the Others volunteer to get pregnant for Juliet's research, all with uniformly fatal results.

In the episode "LaFleur" Amy gives birth to a healthy baby Ethan and there was no mention of her being off the island during conception or pregnancy. It is revealed that during Dharma time women would leave the island to give birth, though Amy is clearly in the third trimester of her pregnancy. This implies that the pregnancy problems were caused by the electromagnetism released during the Incident.

In "The New Man In Charge" it is revealed that pregnant polar bears who were transported to the Island from the Hydra station would suffer dire consequences due to the high levels of electromagnetism.

The Island also affects fertility in men. Jin-Soo Kwon was sterile before coming to the Island, but impregnates his wife while there. In the episode "D.O.C.", Juliet reveals that men on the island have five times the normal sperm count.

==== "Sickness" ====
Contrary to the lack of disease on the Island, Rousseau claims to have killed her team because they had caught a mysterious disease, which necessitated their executions. She also claims that the Others are the carriers of disease. It is later shown that Rousseau's crew was "infected" after entering the tunnels beneath the Temple in order to rescue a member of her team from the Monster. Upon their return, the three crew members show no physical symptoms of anything being wrong with them, but act strangely, even attempting to kill Rousseau. She executed them, believing that they were no longer "themselves" (although she was on the verge of insanity herself after suffering this ordeal). The Temple master, Dogen, refers to both Sayid and Claire as being "infected". This infection is akin to being "claimed" by the Man in Black, and results in a complete loss of emotion and altered personality, a state which both Sayid and Claire were eventually able to overcome.

When Locke is being held captive by Desmond, Desmond asks Locke if any of his people are sick or dying. When Desmond first came to the Island, Kelvin Inman also asked Desmond about his physical health and implied that he was out long enough to have been exposed. A mysterious vaccine is provided by Dharma food drops. It is taken regularly by Kelvin and Desmond in the Swan Station. This vaccine likely exists as a means of enforcing isolation and is of no medical value. It's also highly likely it's for counteracting electromagnetic radiation exposure that's surrounding the Swan Station since 1977. Additional vaccine is administered to Claire's unborn child by Ethan after her kidnapping. During this encounter, Ethan confides in Claire that the Others don't have enough vaccine, implying that either they or their recent abductees required it as well. This vaccine either serves an alternate purpose that Ethan was unwilling to divulge or represents a dramatic misinterpretation of a sickness' true cause.

=== Other physical properties ===
==== Location ====
The Others transmit a signal that they use to locate the Island. The Island is surrounded by a shield of electromagnetic energy, which causes temporal displacement and death when trying to enter or leave the Island, unless the person is traveling from a certain angle and bearing (which changes when the Island moves). The DHARMA Initiative located the Island, after learning about it through the United States Army, by building The Lamp Post, an off-Island station underneath a church, over a pocket of electromagnetic energy that uses the energy and a complex mathematical equation to locate where and when the Island will be. The Island can be physically moved in space, while many of its occupants have been seen to move through time and space, to wherever the island is located at that moment in time. This phenomenon is achieved by tapping into the Island's energy source, as the frozen wheel does.

==== Electromagnetism ====
An unusual form of naturally occurring electromagnetism is present on the island. While physical objects seem to be affected by the time passage, electromagnetism, such as radio waves are not affected. People are able to communicate directly to the outside world without a time lapse. A station was built to study the unique form of electromagnetism found there. Radzinski was very vocal in manipulating electromagnetism "in ways we have never dreamed before". At the end of "Live Together, Die Alone", when Desmond has used the fail-safe device in the Swan station to destroy it, a monitoring station in the Antarctic detects the electromagnetic event. It is the same energy as that in the heart of the Island that's been hinted by the Dharma Initiative. Jacob's brother tried to use the energy to transport himself off of the Island by building the frozen wheel underground.

==== Time travel ====
The Island is surrounded by an invisible electromagnetic barrier in which the normal rules of time do not apply. In "The Economist", a missile fired from a freighter outside the barrier to the Island, carrying a timer in its payload, is shown to take roughly 31 minutes longer to arrive at its designated target area. In the same episode, a helicopter leaves the Island late in the afternoon. Even though the flight only takes about 30 minutes, it arrives at the freighter the next morning. Doc Ray's body washes ashore in "The Shape of Things to Come", but when the freighter is contacted via radio for an explanation, he is alive and well from their perspective. Two episodes later, in "Cabin Fever", the doctor is murdered and thrown overboard.

The barrier poses a threat to those entering or leaving it, particularly if they have been exposed to a high amount of electromagnetism. Doing so under these circumstances can lead to one's consciousness traveling through time (called "temporal displacement" on the show), eventually resulting in death unless a "constant" can be found between the present and the destination time period.

After Benjamin Linus turns the frozen wheel beneath the Orchid station, he finds himself in the Tunisian Desert 10 months later. After the wheel is turned, several characters remaining on the Island are intermittently transported back and forward through time, with each shift being accompanied by a blinding purple flash and health deterioration effects (including headaches and nosebleeds) until Locke puts the wheel back on its axis.

Walt's becoming so tall so quickly was a natural event and not a result of the temporal displacement, although it was likely the inspiration of this device. Malcolm David Kelley's sudden growth spurt had caused a problem for Abrams and Lindelof, who were seeking ways to explain it. In the end, the characters were stuck on the island for 108 days, the same as off the island.

==== Temporal displacement ====
In the fourth-season episode "The Constant", it is revealed that freighter communications officer Minkowski and a crew member named Brandon tried to sneak off the boat to get a closer look at the Island. According to Minkowski, as they approached "something happened" to Brandon that caused them to turn back. Brandon died as a result of this attempt to approach the Island, and Minkowski suffered from temporal displacement (jumping between past and present in his mind) and, lacking a "constant" (some aspect of his life present in both times and to which he would have a strong emotional connection), died soon after.

One crew member, Regina, speaks with Faraday over a radio regarding a rocket payload experiment. At the time, she sounds normal. By the time Sayid and Desmond have reached the freighter, Regina is suffering from some sort of psychosis. She is pretending to be reading a book, even though it is held upside down and she generally appears as "mentally out of it". Later, Regina commits suicide by wrapping herself in heavy chains and jumping into the ocean. No move is made by the crew to dissuade her, with Captain Gault claiming that "she is too far gone." How Regina, having never gotten close to the Island as Minkowski and Brandon had, became ill is never revealed. In "Cabin Fever", Captain Gault informs Martin Keamy that he may be suffering from some sort of dementia connected with the Island.

== Plot devices ==
=== The Man in Black/Smoke Monster ===
The Island is home to a mysterious entity, consisting of a black mass accompanied by mechanical-like sounds and electrical activity within, dubbed the "Smoke Monster" or just the "Monster" by the survivors. The monster has been described by Lost producer Damon Lindelof as "one of the biggest secrets" of the mythology. The producers have often hinted that the black cloud of smoke is not a monster in the traditional sense, nor is it a cloud of nanobots (as some fans have speculated). The smoke monster is established as an antagonist in Lost from the very first episode, "Pilot". The producers' initial plan was for the monster to represent the id, in a manner similar to the "id monster" from the 1956 film Forbidden Planet. This idea was changed by the end of season one, when the character Danielle Rousseau describes the monster as a "security system" for the Island, specifically the ruins of the temple on the Island. This plan was continued into season five, when Rousseau's husband, Robert, describes the monster as a security system that guards the island's temple. It has been repeatedly described as a "security system." It emerges from vents in the ground to attack people, though it does not always attack those it encounters. The Monster is capable of lifting a grown man, and in one instance tosses a man nearly fifty feet into the air. In another it wraps a tendril of smoke around a man's arm, severing it.

In the first episode of season 6, "LA X", it is revealed that the "Locke", with whom Ben is traveling back to the island, has become The Monster, an incarnation of Jacob's nemesis. It appears in the remains of the statue of Taweret and kills five people. One of the people manages to create a ring of ash around himself, temporarily hindering the smoke monster. The monster throws a rock at the man, knocking him out of the circle and making it possible for it to kill him. After the men are all dead, the smoke monster exits, and Jacob's nemesis, in the form of John Locke, immediately appears, stating that he is sorry that Ben had to see him "like that". It is later revealed that The Monster used to be a man whose only goal has been leaving the Island and "going home". After claiming Sayid to his side, and giving the Others the chance to join him, he stormed the temple and massacred all those who did not comply. In "Recon", he gave Sawyer a mission to investigate Hydra Island to see if the coast was clear for him and the Others to travel over there so they could take the Ajira plane and fly off the Island. Later in the episode, it tells Kate that he is sorry about Claire. He tells her that his own mother was crazy, just like Aaron's mother, Claire. In the final episode, he is rendered mortal again, along with Jack, the new protector of the island, when the electromagnetic source at the center of the island is disabled. Trapped in the form of John Locke, the Man in Black fights Jack on the cliffs, stabs him and almost kills him. Kate shoots the Man in Black in the back, and Jack kicks him off the cliff, killing the darkness before it could cross over on a boat to Hydra Island in order to escape the Island using the plane.

=== The Numbers ===
The numbers 4, 8, 15, 16, 23, and 42 appear throughout the series, both in sequence and individually. The numbers add up to 108, another common number in the series: for example, it is said that the Oceanic Six left the island after 108 days, and the button in the hatch had to be pushed every 108 minutes.

The numbers were first explicitly mentioned in the season one episode "Numbers", which was also the 18th episode of the series, 18 being the average of the numbers. They were chosen by Lindelof, J. J. Abrams and David Fury, one of the writers of that episode. Speaking in 2008, Fury remarked that "your guesses are as good as mine" as to what the numbers mean. They are placed throughout the series for a kind of "Easter egg hunt". Sometimes DHARMA test rabbits can be seen that have identification numbers on them; at least twice, the 23rd rabbit has been seen. They can also be seen on items such as sports shirts and on the DHARMA interrogation room door, which is also designated "23". The plane that brought the castaways to the island for the first time was Oceanic 815. During the season 2 episode "Man of Science, Man of Faith", Jack is giving care to two people who have been in a car crash. After one of them dies, a voice is heard in the background saying, "Time of death, 8:15 AM".

According to the DHARMA Orientation video in the Lost Experience, the numbers represent the factors of the Valenzetti Equation, which claims to accurately predict when humanity will be extinguished. A part of the plot is based on certain characters using the numbers to constitute a code that must be entered in a terminal. The writers originally introduced the numbers solely to engineer a meeting between two characters, Hurley and Rousseau, not because they had a plan for them. Due to viewer feedback, however, they were eventually implemented into a greater part of the story.

The numbers are introduced early in season 1: they were broadcast from the island's radio transmitter as a message that drew Rousseau's expedition there. Rousseau changed the message after the deaths of her teammates. The transmission was also heard by military personnel stationed off the island, eventually making their way to Hurley. Some time before the crash, Hurley uses the numbers for a lottery, and wins a huge amount of money, but this seems to bring those around him nothing but misfortune. Because of this, Hurley believes the numbers are cursed. In the "flash-sideways" in season 6, Hurley has again won the lottery, but with different numbers, and appears to have great fortune afterwards.

In the season 1 episode "Deus Ex Machina", in a flashback, Locke is a salesman teaching a kid how to play the Mouse Trap, when he notices a mysterious woman staring at him, he goes to meet her and asks if he could help her, which in turn she says she's looking for the footballs, Locke proceeds to tell her that Aisle 8 are for regulation and Aisle 15 are for Nerf.

In the season five episode "Some Like It Hoth", members of the DHARMA Initiative are shown as they are building the hatch which the survivors would later live in. As they are preparing to place the door on the hatch, a worker asks for the serial number to put on the door. Another worker responds by telling him the numbers, which are inscribed on the hatch door. These numbers are later seen by some of the survivors, including Hurley.

The numbers are seen in various occasions in different places during the series. A flashback in season one that shows Jack and Ana meeting at the airport bar mentions their seats on flight 815; Jack sits in row 23 and Ana Lucia in row 42. In season 6 a part of the plot associates each number with a different character, each of them being a "candidate", according to the Man in Black, destined to become the new 'protector of the Island' in Jacob's place. Jack Shephard was number 23, as in Psalm 23, The Lord is my Shepherd (but 42 is associated with Jin Kwon at that point).

In his last talk to the survivors of the crash, Jacob reveals that the candidate designations are "just numbers".

When the wreckage is found at the bottom of an ocean trench, the TV reporter announces that there were 324 passengers on the plane, which is three times the sum of the numbers (108 × 3 = 324).

In an interview with Lostpedia, producer David Fury confirmed that the number 42 was a reference to The Hitchhiker's Guide to the Galaxy in which it is "the answer to the ultimate question of life, the universe, and everything?".

Lindelof has professed to be a fan of The Illuminatus! Trilogy, which details the 23 enigma, another one of the numbers. He also mentioned the movie The Number 23 and revealed that Jim Carrey (the star of that movie) was the initial choice for the role of Jack Shepard before being recast with Fox.

The number 108 is of great significance in Hinduism and Buddhism.

At the 2005 San Diego Comic-Con, Lindelof stated that "we may never know what the Numbers mean". In a 2010 interview with USA Today, Lindelof also remarked that the show "wasn't about the answer to what the numbers meant, it was really about: 'How did I feel while I was watching Lost?'"

== Character timelines ==
=== The DHARMA Initiative ===
From the 1970s to the 1990s, a group known as The DHARMA Initiative operated through numerous stations scattered across the Island, studying its unique properties. They came into conflict with the Others, known to them as the Hostiles, as a result. They formed a tentative truce with them with strict territorial boundaries set for each side.

The DHARMA Initiative began to decline around the 1980s (most likely following the "Incident"), and was virtually destroyed in 1992 when Benjamin Linus facilitated a massacre of the group, named "the Purge", orchestrated by Richard Alpert and the leader of the Others at the time (probably Charles Widmore, who is shown interacting with Benjamin Linus before the Purge, and is generally known for his ruthlessness). Its facilities were left behind, some of which the Others claimed as their own. As a result of time travel, some of the survivors of Flight 815 become directly involved with The DHARMA Initiative, joining the program in the mid-1970s during the height of its power.

=== The Others ===
The Others are a group of inhabitants that have been on the island for an unknown number of years. It is known that their occupation precedes both the Dharma Initiative and the U.S. Army's exploration of the island, as well as the survivors of Flight 815. Early flashbacks show they have been on the island since at least the mid-19th century, and both Jacob and his rival existing on the Island for time preceding even that (definitely hundreds, possibly thousands of years). The Others used to reside in the barracks first built by the Dharma Initiative to house their employees, after the Purge, but have left the Barracks during season 3 and have not returned.

=== Oceanic Six ===
The Oceanic Six is a group that consists of characters who have safely gotten off the Island and are given flashforward episodes showing them coping with life after a rescue, as opposed to the regular style of flashbacks. The characters are revealed in the first seven episodes of Season 4:

- Jack Shephard, who was the central character in "Through the Looking Glass", and appeared in two flashforwards in "The Beginning of the End"
- Kate Austen, who appeared in the final flashforward of "Through the Looking Glass"
- Hugo "Hurley" Reyes, who was the main character in "The Beginning of the End"
- Sayid Jarrah, who was the central character in "The Economist"
- Aaron Littleton, Claire Littleton's son, born on the island, and raised by Kate as her own son ("Eggtown")
- Sun-Hwa Kwon, featured in "Ji Yeon" as giving birth to a girl

Show runners Damon Lindelof and Carlton Cuse revealed the six characters at the Television Critics Association Summer Press Tour in July 2008.

=== Crossovers ===
Prior to their arrival on the Island, both major and minor characters have crossed paths, often unknowingly, sometimes affecting each other's lives. These crossovers are revealed through characters' flashbacks, and are typically obvious only to viewers. Some intersections are quite noticeable, with different characters conversing with each other, but most often the characters are oblivious to these crossovers, which take the form of other characters' appearances on televisions or as glimpses in the background. The crossovers become more frequent in the final episodes of the first season, as all the characters approach each other before arriving at the airport, and finally board the airplane.

In "The Incident" it is revealed that Jacob, the mysterious leader of the Others, has visited the survivors in different periods of time, indicating that his influence may have had a direct connection to those crossovers.

The show's producers have always said that there was a reason characters appeared in each other's flashbacks. Damon Lindelof has stated that these are not "Easter eggs", but rather a larger part of the mythology of the series.

== Sensory phenomena ==
=== Whispers ===
Whispers can be heard on the Island. They first appear at the end of the episode "Solitary", and were originally intended to be the sound of the Others in the jungle. This idea was changed, and, by the end of season six, it was established that they were the whispers of spirits of deceased people who had not yet "moved on" (or existed in a state of purgatory). Boone's whispers are heard on the Island after his death, talking about Shannon. Some characters to hear the Whispers were Juliet, Jack, Rousseau, Sawyer, Sayid, Hurley, Shannon and Michael on the freighter before he dies.

=== Visions ===
While at first it seems like there are numerous "visions" on Lost, most of those involving a person who is supposed to be dead are in fact not visions, but are either the spirit of a dead person, or the Man in Black taking on the physical form and memories of a dead person. Some visions are left unexplained, for instance the horse which appears to both Kate and Sawyer. Visions have helped several characters achieve certain tasks. Many spirits have appeared on and off the Island, such as Michael Dawson, Jacob, Emily Linus, Claudia, Ana Lucia, Charlie Pace. Some spirits communicate with the living in their dreams, such as Horace Goodspeed and Boone Carlyle, who each appear to John Locke on separate occasions.

Walt has made appearances on the Island in places he could not have been (most notably to Shannon Rutherford in early episodes of season 2 and to John Locke in season 3); since Jacob's brother is unable to take on the form of the living, and since Walt isn't dead, the origin of this vision is unclear, although it may be related to Walt's special powers, which have been hinted at but never fully explained. Also, while Jacob's spirit was on the Island, Jacob as a child appeared before Hurley and physically took a bag from Hurley's hand, thus showing that he was actually physically present, and not just a spirit.
