= The End (Lost) =

- Lost episodes
- Jack Shephard (Matthew Fox) in the bamboo forest with Vincent by his side. This scene mirrors the first scene of the show.
- Episode nos.: Season 6 Episodes 17 and 18
- Directed by: Jack Bender
- Written by: Damon Lindelof; Carlton Cuse
- Production codes: 617 & 618
- Original air date: May 23, 2010
- Running time: 104 minutes

Guest appearances
- Dylan Minnette as David Shephard; Neil Hopkins as Liam Pace; John Pyper-Ferguson as Bocklin; Alan Seabock as Sub captain; Paul Mitri as Roadie; Eric Nemoto as Oceanic rep; Christina Souza as Jean

Episode chronology
← Previous "What They Died For"	Next → "The New Man in Charge"
- Lost season 6

"The End" is the two-part series finale of the American serial drama television series Lost, serving as the 17th and 18th episode of the sixth season, and the 120th and 121st episodes of the series overall. It aired on ABC in the United States on May 23, 2010. In the episode, the Man in Black (Terry O'Quinn) executes his plan to destroy the island as Jack Shephard (Matthew Fox) tries to stop him once and for all. Meanwhile, the true nature of this season's "flash-sideways" narrative device is revealed.

The series finale was written by co-creator/executive producer Damon Lindelof and executive producer Carlton Cuse, and directed by executive producer Jack Bender. Unlike the previous season finales, which were two hours long with advertisements, the series finale was expanded by half an hour, running two and a half hours starting at 9 pm ET, with a retrospective of the past six seasons running for two hours, starting at 7 pm.

"The End" was watched by 13.5 million viewers, but received a polarized response from both critics and fans of the show alike. Reviewers from the Chicago Tribune and IGN called it the best episode of the season and praised its emotion and character. Reviews from the Los Angeles Times and The Philadelphia Inquirer criticized the finale for answering so few of the series' questions. Metacritic gave "The End" a weighted average score of 74 out of 100 based on 31 reviews, indicating "generally favorable reviews", while The Guardian and The Daily Telegraph reported mixed and "lukewarm" reviews. Retrospective reviews have been equally polarized.

== Plot ==
=== Flash-sideways ===
Desmond gathers many of the islanders at the benefit concert of Daniel Widmore (Jeremy Davies) and Drive Shaft. One by one, each protagonist begins to recognize one another based on close contact with a person or object that was important to them throughout their time on the island, receiving flashes of memory. Eventually, most of them remember their past lives and are drawn to the church that was to be the site of Jack's father's funeral.

John Locke (Terry O'Quinn) regains the use of his legs after being successfully operated on by Jack. After remembering his time on the island through the flashes of memory, Locke attempts to convince Jack of the truth, but Jack, although also experiencing flashes of memory, resists the revelation. Locke later meets Ben outside the church where Locke forgives him for murdering him. Ben then meets Hurley, who says everyone is inside, motioning him to join them, but Ben elects to stay outside. As Hurley heads back inside, he says to Ben that he was a "real good number two...", to which Ben replies back that Hurley was a "great number one".

Kate later encounters Jack, and while her presence causes him to experience more flashes, he continues to resist. She takes him to the church and instructs him to enter through the back door, telling him the others will be waiting for him. In the church, he enters a room where there are symbols of Christianity, Hinduism, Judaism and Islam. He then encounters his father's coffin, opens the lid and finds it empty. Christian Shephard (John Terry) then appears behind him. Jack slowly comes to realize that he is dead as well. Christian reassures him that the events leading up to now actually happened and the time he spent with the people on the island was "the most important period" of his life. He explains to Jack that time has no meaning in this place and that they "made" the place to "find each other", independent of the time at which they died. Christian explains that place exists so the Oceanic 815 survivors could "let go" and "move on" together.

Jack and Christian go out into the church to meet the others. Everyone is able to see, recognize, and remember everyone else and their lives together. After reuniting, Christian opens the front doors, revealing another bright light that slowly envelops everyone inside the church.

=== On the island ===
Jack Shephard (Matthew Fox), Kate Austen (Evangeline Lilly) and Hugo "Hurley" Reyes (Jorge Garcia) head to the Heart of the Island, while James "Sawyer" Ford (Josh Holloway) goes after Desmond Hume (Henry Ian Cusick), who was thrown into a well. Arriving there, Sawyer is confronted by Ben Linus (Michael Emerson) and the Man in Black (Terry O'Quinn), who reveals his plan to destroy the island. Sawyer then takes Ben's rifle and reunites with Jack's group. Jack then tells Sawyer that he plans to confront the Man in Black.

At the same time, Desmond, having been rescued by Rose Henderson (L. Scott Caldwell) and Bernard Nadler (Sam Anderson), is confronted by the Man in Black, who has Ben with him. The Man in Black threatens to kill Rose and Bernard if Desmond does not come with him, and Desmond complies, provided the Man in Black leaves the couple unharmed. Meanwhile, Miles Straume (Ken Leung) finds a no-longer-ageless Richard Alpert (Nestor Carbonell) in the jungle, and they set out by boat to destroy the Ajira plane which would allow the Man in Black to escape. Along the way, they rescue Frank Lapidus (Jeff Fahey), who survived the sinking of the submarine, and they decide to leave the island by using the plane.

On the way to the Heart of the Island, Jack's group encounters the Man in Black's group. Jack tells the Man in Black that he is going to kill him, and together with Desmond, they travel to the Heart of the Island. Jack tells Sawyer that he believes Desmond can kill the Man in Black because he thinks Jacob brought Desmond back not as bait but as a weapon. Desmond tells Jack that destroying the island and killing the Man in Black doesn't matter because he is going down to the Heart of the Island and leaving for another place.

Jack and the Man in Black lower Desmond down to the Heart of the Island and Desmond reaches a chamber, leading to a glowing pool with an elongated stone at its center. Immune to the pool's electromagnetic energy, Desmond manages to remove the giant stone cork at the center of the pool. However, the light goes out and the pool dries up, setting about the destruction of the island which the Man in Black predicted. A result of Desmond's act is an unforeseen side-effect of making the Man in Black mortal again. During a prolonged fight, the Man in Black stabs Jack in the same spot where his appendix was taken out and almost kills Jack when Kate shoots the Man in Black, allowing Jack to kick the Man in Black off the cliff to his death. The island continues to crumble and Jack realizes that he has to restore the light at the Heart of the Island. He tells Kate to get Claire Littleton (Emilie de Ravin) on the plane and leave the island in case he fails. The two profess their love for each other and Kate leaves with Sawyer while Hurley and Ben follow Jack back to the pool.

Kate and Sawyer travel to Hydra Island via Desmond's boat Elizabeth, to the site of the Ajira Airlines plane where Lapidus, Richard, and Miles have been quickly trying to make it air-worthy. Kate convinces Claire she can help Claire raise Aaron and they head for the plane. After Kate, Sawyer, and Claire board the plane, Lapidus successfully gets it off the island.

Jack leads Hurley and Ben back to the Heart of the Island, where Jack convinces an emotional Hurley to take over as the protector of the island, stating Hurley was always meant to be the leader. Hurley and Ben lower Jack to the dry pool where he rescues a barely conscious Desmond. Jack manages to restore the light by replacing the stone cork and is enveloped in the light that surrounds him. Hurley, in his role as the new protector of the island, does not know what to do. Ben tells him he should help Desmond get home and suggests there may be a better way of protecting the island than how Jacob did. Hurley asks Ben for help, and Ben is honored. Jack reawakens outside by a river and walks toward the bamboo forest where he first awoke after the crash. After Jack collapses to the ground, Vincent approaches and lies next to him. After watching the Ajira plane fly overhead away from the island, Jack closes his eyes as he dies from his injuries.

== Production ==
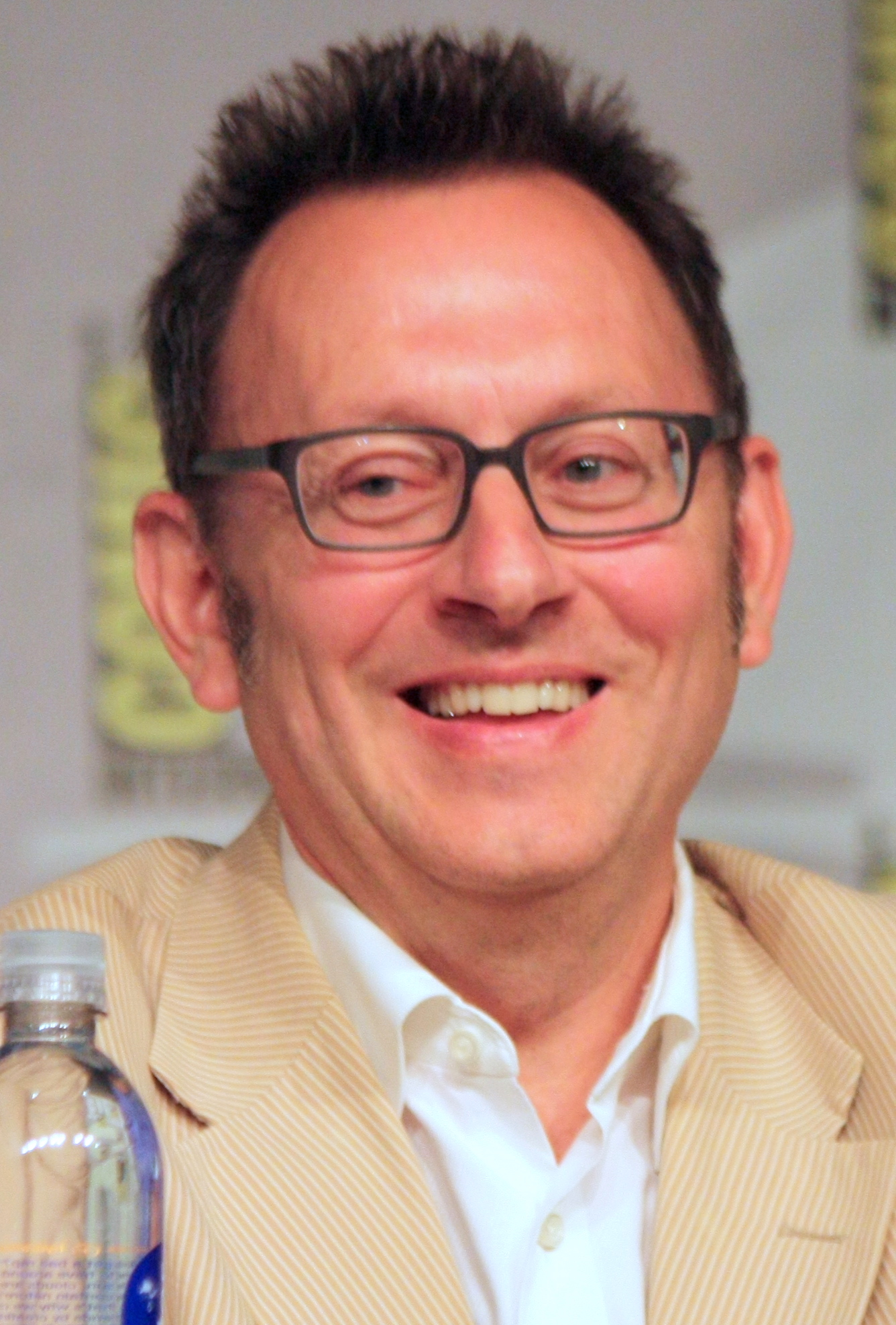
Michael Emerson said that the ending grew "more satisfying" the more he thought about it.

Damon Lindelof, producer, reported on his Twitter page that the series finale of Lost completed shooting in Hawaii on April 24, 2010, exactly six years after filming was completed on the show's pilot. When interviewed about the finale, Carlton Cuse stated that it had a real, definite resolution instead of "'a snow globe, waking up in bed, it's all been a dream, cut to black' kind of ending," referencing the series finales of St. Elsewhere, Newhart, and The Sopranos, respectively.

Only Matthew Fox and Terry O'Quinn's scripts explained the nature of the Sideways world; Lindelof and Carlton Cuse explained its meaning to the others while filming the church scene, the last time the cast members were together. They have expressed satisfaction regarding the finale; Daniel Dae Kim stated "If you think about how many pieces the writers had to put together in order to make it fall into place, it's mind-boggling, and they did such a great job... For me it was very satisfying. After I read it, I had to sit for five or 10 minutes, just reflecting and digesting, because it definitely makes an impact." Emerson said:

I have received the finale by degrees. I read the script without the secret scenes, then I read the secret scenes, then I shot the script and each time I'm thinking about 'what does this mean?' When I first read it, the ending wasn't clear to me – but since then it's grown more clear and I have to say, grown more satisfying the more I think about it. I expect a mixture of satisfaction and consternation amongst the viewers when it airs. But once they rewatch it, rethink about it and possibly look at the saga again, gradually they will feel like they have just read a good novel—but you have to chew on it for a while.

Carbonell described the finale as being "all about everyone's resolutions." Cusick said "There are so many walks of life getting together to talk about the show and so many issues to be brought up and that's exactly what the ending will bring up. People will be talking about it for weeks afterwards and that's what the show has always done."

Instead of being displayed along with ABC promotional material (which in most cases would consist of a preview of the next Lost episode), the finale's closing credits are shown alongside various shots of the Oceanic 815 plane wreckage. However, this footage was not added by the producers of the show and is not considered a part of the actual episode. ABC independently decided to add the footage as a soft, nostalgic transition between the final scene and upcoming local news broadcasts.

After the finale, a post-finale special of Jimmy Kimmel Live!, titled Jimmy Kimmel Live: Aloha to Lost, aired at 12:05 am, showing three alternate endings, which turned out to be finale spoofs from Survivor, The Sopranos, and Newhart. An ABC source reported that the DVD and Blu-ray release of season six will feature twenty minutes of additional scenes, some of which will have answers to questions, cut from the storyline because of running time.

=== Returning actors ===
All former series regulars who appear (Jeremy Davies, Maggie Grace, Rebecca Mader, Elizabeth Mitchell, Dominic Monaghan, Ian Somerhalder, Cynthia Watros) are restored to the main cast in this episode. Those who do not return are Adewale Akinnuoye-Agbaje, Malcolm David Kelley, Harold Perrineau, Michelle Rodriguez, Kiele Sanchez, and Rodrigo Santoro (Rodriguez appeared in the previous episode). Additionally, long-time recurring guest stars Sam Anderson, L. Scott Caldwell, François Chau (the first time Chau was credited for his appearance), Fionnula Flanagan, John Terry and Sonya Walger are upgraded to the main cast.

Despite being killed off in the twelfth episode of the season and reprising her role only once more in the thirteenth, cast member Zuleikha Robinson received an on-screen, main cast credit for every episode. Adewale Akinnuoye-Agbaje turned down an offer to return because of salary disagreements. Despite the fact that it was earlier reported by Carlton Cuse that Malcolm David Kelley would appear, he only appeared in archive footage. Long-time recurring cast member Mira Furlan was initially contracted to appear in three episodes of the season, starting with "What They Died For". Her subsequent two episodes, the two-part series finale, were cancelled; she was simply told, "We don't need her".

== Broadcast ==
The episode was broadcast on ABC in the eastern United States and CTV in eastern Canada, then simultaneously in the western United States, Western Canada, Fox in Italy and Portugal, Fox and Cuatro in Spain, DiziMax in Turkey, Sky1 in the United Kingdom and Ireland, and HOT 3 in Israel at 9 pm Pacific Time on May 23, 2010. Because of the time difference, its initial simulcast airing was at 5 am BST, 6 am CEST. In Ireland, RTÉ Two decided to air it on Monday, May 24 at 9 pm rather than its usual Thursday night slot in the interest of fans who did not want the ending to be spoiled. ABC charged up to US$900,000 for a 30-second commercial during the May 23 U.S. broadcast.

=== Ratings and viewership ===
In its original American broadcast, "The End" was viewed by 13.5 million households with a 5.8 rating/15% share in the 18–49 demographic, coming first in every time slot and boosting ABC to the highest rated network on Sunday. The best rated half-hour (the last one) was viewed by 15.31 million viewers and earned a 6.4 rating/19% share in the 18–49 demographic. At least 20.5 million viewers watched at least six minutes of the episode according to ABC. After its first broadcast, the series finale became the 55th highest viewed series finale ever in the United States. Entertainment Weekly's Michael Ausiello called the ratings "Solid, not spectacular". According to Ausiello, even though it was the show's highest rated episode in two years, it was still "far from a record-breaking performance".

In the UK, 584,000 viewers tuned in to see the episode on Sky 1 during a 5 am broadcast. A later broadcast the following night was viewed by approximately 2.5 million. In Canada, viewers averaged over two million with the 7 pm special and the two-hour finale.

== Critical reception ==
=== Contemporaneous reviews ===
"The End" provoked an immediate response, and received a strongly polarized reaction from both fans and TV critics alike. Response to the episode was positive and negative in equal measures, both in the United States and internationally. According to Metacritic, "The End" received "generally favorable reviews", with a Metascore – a weighted average based on the impressions of 31 critical reviews – of 74 out of 100. Of the most positive reviews, IGN writer Chris Carbot gave the episode a score of 10/10, describing it as "one of the most enthralling, entertaining and satisfying conclusions [he] could have hoped for." Eric Deggans of the St. Petersburg Times also gave "The End" a perfect score, calling it "emotional, funny [and] expertly measured". Robert Bianco of USA Today rated the finale as perfect as well, stating that it could "stand with the best any series has produced". James Poniewozik of Time also praised "The End", calling it "full of heart and commitment"; Zap2it's Ryan McGee described the episode as "a masterpiece." Jason Hughes of TV Squad felt that "as finales go, 'The End' will definitely go down as one of the more satisfying ones". Emily VanDerWerff of the Los Angeles Times felt that the episode "provides character payoffs we've been waiting for. ... The important thing ... is not answers. It's resolution. And 'Lost' provided that in spades." Richard Roeper gave the episode an A+ rating, calling it a "great finale to one of the best TV shows of all time."

Not all critics were satisfied with the episode: the British newspapers The Guardian and The Daily Telegraph both reported that "The End" received negative reviews and disappointed its viewers. Alan Sepinwall of Star-Ledger was less enthusiastic about the finale and stated that he didn't consider the episode to be "wholly satisfying, either as closure for this season or the series", highlighting the episode's "narrative dead ends" as part of the reason. Mike Hale of The New York Times gave "The End" a mixed review, as the episode showed that the series was "shaky on the big picture". Matthew Gilbert of The Boston Globe also gave the episode a mixed review, citing some of the episode's "quite hokey" metaphors. David Zurawik of the Baltimore Sun gave the episode a highly negative review, describing the final scenes as "wimpy, phony, quasi-religious, white-light [and] huggy-bear". He added: "It looked like [Jack] was walking into a Hollywood wrap party without food or music – just a bunch of actors grinning idiotically for 10 minutes and hugging one another." Max Read of Gawker was also particularly scathing, calling the finale "incredibly dumb" and remarking that "it ended in the worst way possible". Mary McNamara of the Los Angeles Times gave the episode 1½ stars out of 5, saying that many fans would wish "for a time slip that would give them those 2½ hours and possibly six seasons back". M.L. House of TV Fanatic felt "bored" and "especially disappointed" by the finale, and that the show's resolution was "overarching". Peter Mucha of The Philadelphia Inquirer also spoke negatively of the finale, calling the series "one of TV's longest, lamest cons." Laura Miller of Salon.com suggested that the finale episode was a failure because of its fan base, calling the series "the quintessential example of a pop masterpiece ruined by its own fans."

Outside the US, the episode also prompted a polarized response. The BBC's Entertainment reporter Kev Geoghegan felt that the episode was "emotionally satisfying" and that "the show was wrapped up rather nicely". Michael Deacon in The Daily Telegraph was "beatifically surprised" at the "great" ending. Shane Hegarty in The Irish Times felt that the final scene was "somewhat of a letdown", comparing it to the recent similar ending of Ashes to Ashes and contrasting it with the final episode of The Sopranos. He remarked: "[The Sopranos] was not about mystery, but its final scene was so inscrutable that fans are still squinting in an effort to figure it out. Lost's finale, though, was not too obtuse." Some reviewers ended puzzled about the meaning of Lost. Tim Teeman in The Times referred to "a global scratching of heads" in his review but concluded "The questions are ceaseless: it may be healthier, as one online fan put it, 'to just accept it and move on'". Steve Busfield and Richard Vine of The Guardian spoke positively about the episode, saying that the series would "continue to baffle, infuriate and delight fans for an eternity". Conversely, the TV critic Charlie Brooker, also writing for The Guardian, remarked that "The End"'s plot "made less sense than a milk hammock", while the comedian Danny Baker called the episode "an outrage".

=== Retrospective reviews ===
Reception of the episode, as well as later seasons of Lost on a whole, remained polarized. Chris E. Hayner of Zap2It named "The End" as the number one worst series finale, calling it "the king of disappointing series finales". IndieWire similarly branded the finale as the number-one worst ever, criticizing it for being "unbelievably long" and having a "decided lack of dramatic tension and any real thrills". Discussing the final season as a whole, IndieWire described season six as "directionless" and "largely a 'miss'". Writing for MTV in 2015, Josh Wigler called the episode "the finale that sucks", and said that it would live on "as the model for how NOT to finish your show". Daniel D'Addario, writing for Salon.com, listed "The End" as one of the "worst finales ever", describing the series as "a show whose twists and turns didn't always seem to be undertaken by people who knew what they were doing."

The resolution of the flash-sideways storyline as being a form of purgatory received considerable criticism: writing for Rolling Stone in May 2015, Sean Collins named "The End" as one of the worst series finales, and described the flash-sideways plot point as "corny". Collins felt that "this short-sighted decision [made] the series hard to happily revisit", and that the episode as a whole had "balked". Brian Moylan of The Guardian felt that the finale had failed to fulfill some of the writers' promises, specifically the purgatory storyline. Moylan believed that the writers had set up mysteries that they "had no intention of answering". Danny Walker of the Daily Mirror listed the episode as one of the seven worst TV series finales, saying that it "left viewers with even more unanswered questions". Maddie Crum of The Huffington Post selected "The End" as her choice for the most disappointing series finale of all time, saying that it was "a complete stock ending" with "cheap pathos plays". In 2019, Kelly Lawler of USA Today named the episode the third worst series finale, describing the ending as "easy" and "schmaltzy".

Praise for the series finale often focuses on emotional gravitas and character development. Writing in September 2014, Tom Eames of Digital Spy defended the finale, explaining that, although "divisive and controversial", it was "a beautiful piece of television". He stated: "It had returning characters, tears, action, romance and as happy an ending as possible for a show like Lost." Cory Barker of TV.com also retrospectively reviewed the episode positively, naming it one of his all-time favorite series finales, and describing it as "emotionally satisfying" and "jam-packed with amazing moments". Entertainment Weekly listed "The End" as the seventh best series finale ever, describing it as "a high-energy epic romp". A decade after the series wrapped, Justin Kirkland of Esquire praised the finale, describing it as "on par, and expected from some of the greatest television of today".

Reception from audiences continues to be mixed: as of April 2014, an ongoing poll for E! states that 53.87% of the audience disliked the finale, while the remaining 46.13% liked it. In 2021, 11 years after the episode was broadcast, respondents to a survey conducted by the website OnBuy.com name "The End" as the most disappointing series finale ever, with its receiving 27.3% of the vote.

=== Awards and nominations ===
The episode was nominated in eight categories for the 62nd Primetime Emmy Awards, the most Emmy nominations for a Lost episode. The episode was nominated for Primetime Emmy Awards in the categories of Outstanding Directing for a Drama Series and Outstanding Writing for a Drama Series. For the Creative Arts Emmy Awards, "The End" won for Outstanding Single-Camera Picture Editing for a Drama Series, while other nominations included Outstanding Sound Editing for a Series, Outstanding Sound Mixing for a Comedy or Drama Series, Outstanding Music Composition for a Series (Original Dramatic Score).
