= Across the Sea (Lost) =

- Lost episode
- "Mother" (Allison Janney) shows young Jacob (Kenton Duty) and young Man in Black (Ryan Bradford) the "Heart of the Island".
- Episode no.: Season 6 Episode 15
- Directed by: Tucker Gates
- Written by: Carlton Cuse; Damon Lindelof
- Production code: 615
- Original air date: May 11, 2010
- Running time: 43 minutes

Guest appearances
- Mark Pellegrino as Jacob; Allison Janney as Mother; Ryan Bradford as Young Man in Black; Lela Loren as Claudia; Titus Welliver as Man in Black; Kenton Duty as Young Jacob; Ivo Nandi as Hunter

Episode chronology
| ← Previous "The Candidate" | Next → "What They Died For" |
- Lost season 6

"Across the Sea" is the 15th episode of the sixth season of the serial drama television series Lost and 118th episode overall. The episode aired on May 11, 2010, on ABC in the United States. The episode was written by Carlton Cuse & Damon Lindelof and directed by Tucker Gates. The episode is centered on Jacob and The Man in Black. This episode is the second in the season that does not feature a "flash-sideways".

The episode, unlike most Lost episodes, does not divide its time between two different time settings, but takes place entirely in the past, except for a brief scene at the end from the season one episode "House of the Rising Sun". It depicts the origins of the characters of Jacob (Mark Pellegrino) and his brother, The Man in Black (Titus Welliver), and how they came to be on the island. It also reveals the identities of the corpses discovered in the cave in "House of the Rising Sun". It is the only episode of the series in which none of the series regulars appears, except in the flashback sequence.

This is the only episode where the Man in Black appears in his original, human form. In all of his other appearances, he is either in his smoke form or in the form of a dead person. Although he appears in his own form in "The Incident" and "Ab Aeterno", this was an imitation of his original form which by that point was dead.

This episode is notable for receiving a widely mixed opinion, with many commentators alternately considering it one of the best or worst episodes of the series.

== Plot ==
Washed ashore on the island, a pregnant woman named Claudia (Lela Loren) encounters an unnamed woman (Allison Janney). The woman helps Claudia give birth to her son, who Claudia names Jacob. Another boy is unexpectedly born. The woman kills Claudia and raises the twins as her own, keeping them ignorant of the outside world. She teaches them to be distrustful of humanity, which she regards as corrupt and dangerous.

At age 13, Jacob's brother (the future Man in Black) finds a Senet game. Jacob (Kenton Duty) asks about the box and his brother (Ryan Bradford) asks him to keep it secret, but the woman (Mother) sees through Jacob. She confronts Jacob's brother and claims she left the box for him, telling the young boy that he is "special". When the boy persists in asking about their origins, Mother explains that she came from her own mother, who is now dead, adding that the boys will never need to worry about death.

After following a boar, Jacob and his brother discover other people on the island. Mother warns the brothers to avoid the other people; she reluctantly decides to show the brothers a tunnel filled with light and an underground stream. She claims that one of them will eventually be the protector, and that she has made them incapable of harming each other. Mother explains that the light is highly coveted and warns that "if the light goes out here, it goes out everywhere."

A vision of Claudia appears to the young Man in Black. She reveals herself as their birth mother, and claims the other people came to the island with her. The young Man in Black confronts Mother about Claudia's claims, and attempts to convince Jacob to join the other people with him. However, Jacob refuses and stays with Mother.

Over the course of the next 30 years, Jacob (Mark Pellegrino) visits his brother (Titus Welliver) at the camp he shares with the other people. The Man in Black reveals they have discovered a way to leave the island by digging wells in spots where "metal behaves strangely". Jacob declines his invitation to leave.

When Mother hears of what the Man in Black is doing, she visits him and learns he and the others have constructed a wheel in a well. He tells her that his people have dug into the light from other locations on the island, and plan to create a system that will allow them to leave. Upon hearing this, she knocks the Man in Black unconscious. When he awakens, he discovers the people in the camp massacred, and the well completely filled in.

Meanwhile, Mother shows Jacob the tunnel of light again, explaining that Jacob is to succeed her in guarding it. She tells Jacob never to enter the tunnel, warning of a fate worse than death. Jacob reluctantly drinks a wine that Mother pours, making him the new protector.

Enraged by her actions, the Man in Black stabs Mother and asks why she would not let him leave the island. She replies that she loves him, and dies. Jacob retaliates by attacking his brother and throwing him into the tunnel of light. The smoke monster emerges in his place. Jacob then finds the Man in Black's physical body and places it with Mother’s in the cave where she lived, along with a pouch containing the black and white stones they used in the game.

The corpses and stones are found centuries later by Jack Shephard (Matthew Fox) and Kate Austen (Evangeline Lilly), and dubbed Adam and Eve by John Locke (Terry O'Quinn). (Note: This scene was already depicted in House of the Rising Sun.)

== Reception ==
"Across the Sea" is one of the most polarizing episodes of Lost. Writers Damon Lindelof and Carlton Cuse said on their podcast that even they were shocked by fans' reaction to the episode, stating they had received comments ranging from saying "This is one of the best episodes ever" to "You ruined Lost". The episode received mixed reviews from critics, and a divided reaction from fans. Review aggregator website Metacritic gave the episode a score of 58 out of 100, indicating "Mixed or Average Reviews". The score was down on the previous episode's score of 92 and is the lowest-rated episode of the season. Teresa Kiessling of NPD, said "Now we just need to learn the origin of their Mother", and indicated that the episode did little to satisfy viewer's curiosity surrounding the origins of Jacob and Man In Black. Noel Murray of The A.V. Club stated "I have only one real criticism of "Across The Sea," and it's that when Lost deals directly with the transcendental—rather than just glancing at it—the show can get awfully gooey, and painfully blunt." Emily VanDerWerff of the Los Angeles Times wrote, "One part of me, the TV critic part, the part that dissects these things and picks them apart and looks for things to dislike about them, mostly really liked the episode, aside from a few niggling points." Jeff Jensen of Entertainment Weekly stated "Across The Sea" was "an unconventional outing that deserves props for benching its stars to give us a story that felt absolutely necessary for establishing the Big Picture context for the final act that is at last upon us." Chris Carabott of IGN gave the episode a score of 6.8, saying that he felt frustrated that at this point of the show, it is not giving many answers.

Some critics were very disappointed with the episode. James Poniewozik of Time stated "'Across the Sea' took a series that is deeply and richly psychological and character-based and moved it into the realm of the allegorical." Maureen Ryan of the Chicago Tribune stated "For a lot of reasons, this was not an episode that goes in the Win column. It was actually seriously disappointing, if not disheartening."
