= Jacob (Lost) =

Fictional character of the TV series Lost

- Lost character
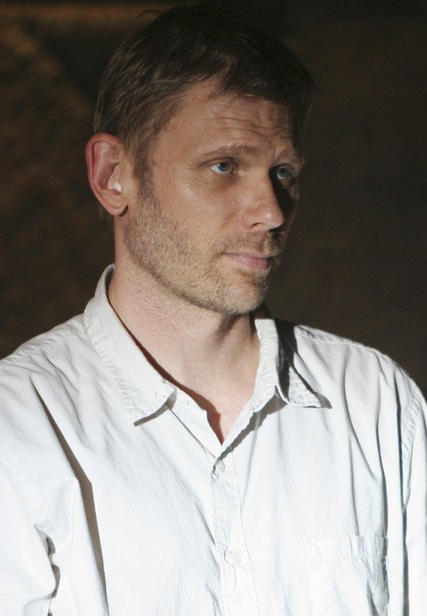
- Mark Pellegrino as Jacob
- First appearance: "The Incident"
- Last appearance: "What They Died For"
- Portrayed by: Mark Pellegrino (Adult Jacob); Kenton Duty (Young Jacob)
- Centric episode(s): "The Incident" "Across the Sea"

In-universe information
- Gender: Male
- Occupation: Protector of the Island
- Relatives: The Man in Black
- Nationality: Roman

Jacob is a fictional character of the ABC television series Lost played by Mark Pellegrino. He was first mentioned as the true leader of the Others by Ben Linus and was described as a "great man" that was also "brilliant", "powerful" and "unforgiving". He made his first appearance in the final episode of season five. Despite being killed in that episode, he continued to appear as a spirit, as well as being corporeal in flashbacks in the episodes "Ab Aeterno" and "Across the Sea".

Being an unseen character for much of the series, Jacob is revealed to have been responsible for the plane crash in response to a conflict with his nemesis and brother, The Man in Black. He has been the protector of the island for millennia and has been referred to as "the man in charge." In some of his appearances, Jacob has shown supernatural powers including immortality, healing, omniscience, and changing peoples' destiny to suit his goals. Due to these powers, he has had a considerable influence on the lives of several main characters including Jack Shephard, Kate Austen, John Locke, James "Sawyer" Ford and Hugo "Hurley" Reyes.

== Before the crash of Oceanic Flight 815 ==
Jacob's earliest chronological appearance is in the sixth season episode "Across the Sea" where he is born to a Roman woman named Claudia, who was shipwrecked on the island sometime in the 1st century. Claudia also gave birth to Jacob's brother, otherwise known as The Man in Black. She was then murdered by the female protector of the Island, who then raised the brothers. Jacob was clothed in light cloth, a trademark of his that continued into adulthood. They were told that there was no life outside the island and that it was just them. They were also told about a mysterious light that eventually one of them had to protect.

Eventually, the Man in Black discovered that their "mother" had lied to him and told Jacob that she was not their mother, but they belonged to a group of people who had arrived on the island with their biological mother. Jacob loved his mother too much and did not want to believe this. He ended up staying with his mother for the next 30 years, while the Man in Black lived with his people, though the brothers stayed in contact. The Man in Black and his people were about to discover how to tap into the light (which is revealed to be a source of electromagnetism) as a means of escaping the island. Their mother later initiated Jacob into becoming her replacement and proclaiming afterwards "Now we're the same". After learning about the Man in Black's plan to leave the Island from Jacob, the mother killed all of the Man in Black's people. In a fit of rage, he killed her. In revenge, Jacob threw his brother into the cavern which emitted the light, an act which he was told by his mother would lead to a fate "worse than death". The Man in Black emerged later as the Smoke Monster and was now trapped on the island. Wanting to escape, he wanted to kill Jacob, but was unable to do so. Due to the machinations of their mother, Jacob and the Man in Black are not able to kill each other. As a result, The Man in Black soon began a long-term plan to manipulate other people who came to the Island into killing Jacob.

Aside from making sure the Man in Black stays on the Island, Jacob brings people to the Island to further a philosophical debate that humanity is innately good while the Man in Black echoed their mother's belief that humanity is inherently corrupt, a debate that has raged on for centuries with numerous casualties.

Jacob's next chronological appearance was in the sixth-season episode "Ab Aeterno" set in 1867 when Richard Alpert became shipwrecked on the island. The Man in Black quickly manipulated him into attempting to kill Jacob. However, Jacob convinced Alpert to join him and granted him immortality, told him the true nature of the island, and made him his spokesperson. Whenever people crashed on the Island, Richard convinced them to come under Jacob's wing, thus creating the island natives dubbed "The Others". Richard was the leader at first; however, it was eventually moved on to others like Charles Widmore, Eloise Hawking and eventually Ben Linus. Over time, Jacob had Richard recruit people from the mainland to become part of his group such as Juliet Burke and Tom Friendly. The leader of the Others would converse with Jacob and pass on his orders to the rest of the Others (who were not allowed to see him). However, when Ben became the leader, Jacob refused to show himself to Ben and Ben had to get the orders from Richard, sparking a deepening resentment Ben had toward Jacob regarding his own importance.

For centuries, Jacob feared that The Man in Black would eventually kill him, so he chose candidates who would succeed him after his death. He visited Kate and Sawyer when they were children. Specifically, he protected Kate when she was caught stealing and touched her. He then made contact with a young Sawyer when he was writing a threatening note to Anthony Cooper. He later visited Sun-Hwa Kwon and Jin-Soo Kwon at their wedding and touched them to give his blessing. He also touched Locke when Locke apparently died after being pushed out a window of a very high building. He then touched Jack after Jack was taught about the counting to five strategy from his father. He visited Sayid Jarrah and this leads to saving him from dying with his wife. Hurley was touched by him right before boarding Ajira Flight 316. He managed to make all the candidates board Oceanic Flight 815 so they would crash on the island and succeed him.

At some point before the crash of Ajira Flight 316, Jacob recruited his long-time bodyguard Ilana Verdansky to help protect the remaining six candidates: Jack, Sawyer, Jin & Sun, Hurley, and Sayid. In turn, Verdansky got a group of others including an associate named Bram, to facilitate the return of the candidates to the island on the Ajira flight and to act as Jacob's bodyguards.

== After the crash of Oceanic Flight 815 and Ajira 316 ==
The Man in Black finally found a loophole in Ben Linus. The Man in Black in the form of John Locke convinces Ben that Jacob has neglected him and Ben must kill Jacob. Jacob awaited his doom in a statue of Tawaret where he lived. As Ben and Locke/MIB enter, Jacob makes a final attempt to convince Ben not to kill him. However, Ben stabbed Jacob several times and then The Man in Black kicked him into the fire. Jacob then returned as a ghost and guided Hurley and the rest of the survivors as to how to defeat the Man in Black. At some point in the past, Jacob compiled a list of 364 candidates (virtually everyone that has visited the island since at least 1988) on a glass dial in a derelict lighthouse that only he is aware of until he instructs Hurley to take Jack there in a successful effort to show how important the latter is to his plan. Jacob constructed the list in a way that could correspond to certain numbers, just as he did in a cave that had more recent revisions. The Man in Black later showed Sawyer this cave in his elaborate plan to kill the candidates. It is later revealed that the candidates can't be killed by the Man in Black due to Jacob's rules so the former improvised his plot by manipulating the candidates into killing themselves which became partly successful with the deaths of Jin, Sun, and Sayid. Jacob's spirit finally vanished after he had Jack succeed him.

== Development ==
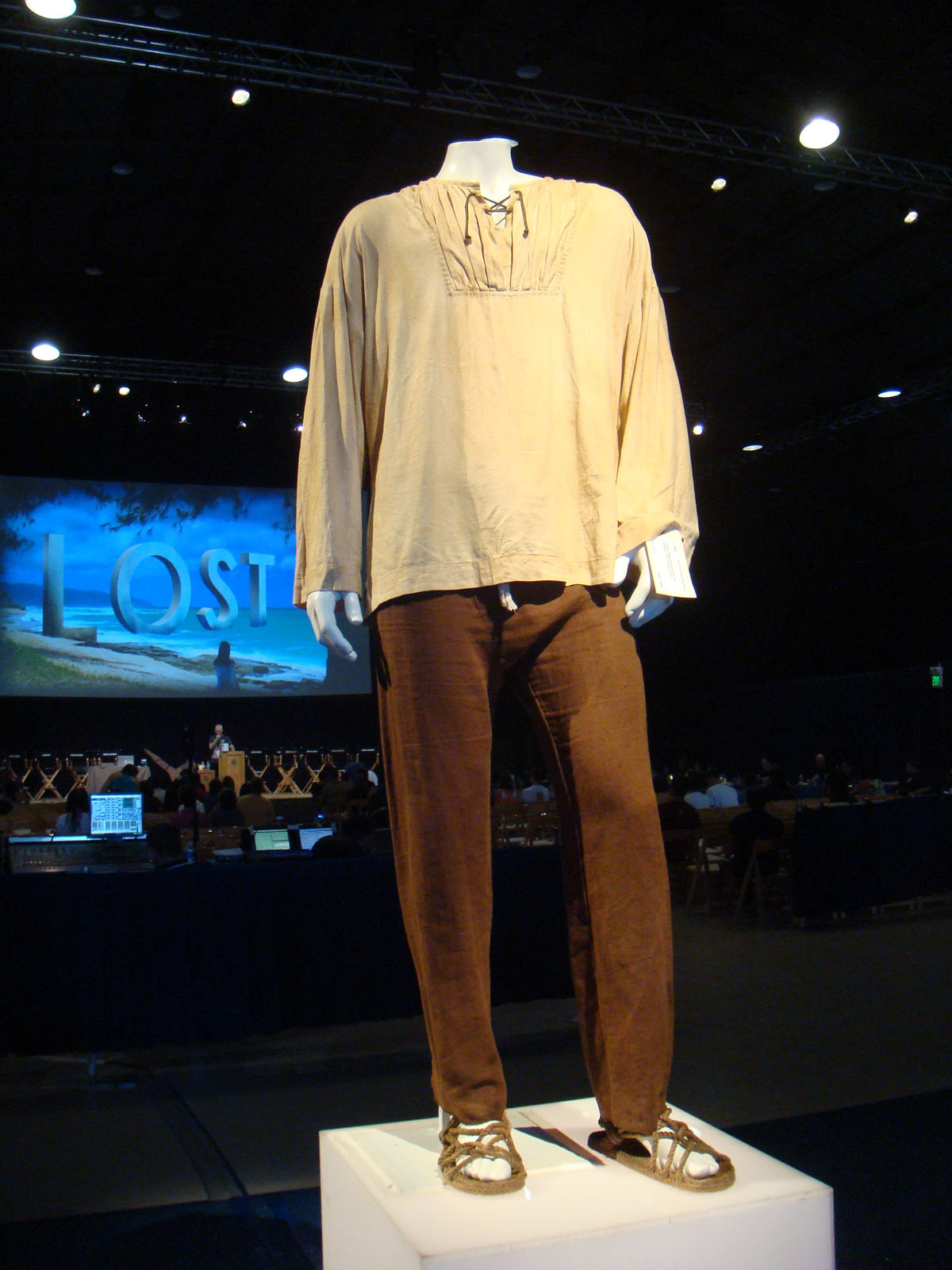
Clothes worn by Jacob

The producers, particularly Damon Lindelof and Carlton Cuse, have implied that the character was inspired by Aslan from the Chronicles of Narnia, showcasing his god-like powers and kind nature. Much like Aslan, Jacob serves as an almost eternal guardian of a fantastical realm—in this case the Island instead of Narnia. Lindelof also stated that he and co-creator J. J. Abrams had planned for the concept of light and dark to eventually be personified by Jacob and Man in Black, referencing the scene in Pilot, Part 2 where Locke explains the game of backgammon to Walt Lloyd. In addition, Christ can be seen as the prototypical model for the character of Jacob which was also the case for Aslan. In the episode, "What They Died For", Jacob appears before a burning bush and Jack accepts his responsibilities, mirroring Moses from the Book of Exodus. Another similarity can be attributed to Zoroastrianism where Jacob can be seen as Ahura Mazda and the Man in Black is that of Angra Mainyu ("the Angry Man"). That phrase is used by Jacob's assistant, Dogen, who explains the nature of the Man in Black to Sayid.
