= Man in Black (Lost) =

Character from the American mystery fiction television series Lost

- Lost character
- The Man in Black in "Across the Sea"
- First appearance: "Pilot" (as The Monster) "The Incident"
- Last appearance: "The End"
- Created by: J. J. Abrams; Jeffrey Lieber; Damon Lindelof
- Portrayed by: Titus Welliver (real form); Ryan Bradford (real form, child); John Terry (Christian Shephard); Adetokumboh M'Cormack (Yemi); Tania Raymonde (Alex Rousseau); Mirelly Taylor (Isabella); Terry O'Quinn (John Locke)

In-universe information
- Species: Human (formerly); Electromagnetic entity
- Gender: Male
- Family: Jacob (twin brother), Claudia (mother), Woman (adoptive mother)
- Nationality: Roman
- Centric Episodes: "The Incident", "Across the Sea"

The Man in Black (also called "The Smoke Monster" or simply "The Monster") is the main antagonist of the American ABC television series Lost. He appeared as a cloud of black smoke until the final episode of season five where he appeared as a middle-aged man dressed in black. (Note: In the second half of season 5, he was being portrayed by Terry O'Quinn, but this was only revealed in season 6.) In season six, he appeared in the physical form of John Locke (Terry O'Quinn). He exhibited the ability to scan the minds and memories of others, allowing him to confront characters such as Mr. Eko (Adewale Akinnuoye-Agbaje) and Ben Linus (Michael Emerson), with "judgement", and assume the appearances and memories of the dead, such as Christian Shephard (John Terry), Yemi (Adetokumboh M'Cormack), Alex Rousseau (Tania Raymonde), and Locke. According to Jacob, it is the incarnation of evil, and its primary goal—to escape from the island—would be the "end of everything good".

Various other characters have implied that his escape would be catastrophic and could even cause the destruction of reality. A longtime resident of the island, the true nature of The Man in Black was long shrouded in mystery. It had been described by Lost producer Damon Lindelof as "one of the biggest secrets" of the mythology of Lost while the producers have often hinted that the black cloud of smoke was not a monster in the traditional sense. TV Guide included the character in their list of "The 60 Nastiest Villains of All Time" in 2013.

== Arc ==
=== Before the crash of Oceanic 815 ===
Prior to the twentieth century, The Man in Black's earliest chronological appearance occurs in the sixth-season episode "Across the Sea", which depicts his birth on the island to a woman named Claudia (Lela Loren), whose ship breaks apart offshore. An unnamed woman (Allison Janney) delivers him and his twin brother Jacob (Mark Pellegrino) but kills their mother and raises the boys herself. Jacob is swaddled in light cloth while The Man in Black is wrapped in dark. The woman raises the twins to be ignorant of a world beyond the island and of death itself. She also raises them to be distrustful of humanity, whom she regards as corrupt and dangerous. At age thirteen, the twins discover the other survivors of Claudia's ship on the island, and their adoptive mother takes them to a mysterious cave filled with light with a stream running into it. She tells them it is "The Heart of the Island" and one day they will be its caretakers. Soon after, Claudia's ghost appears to the young Man in Black and tells him the truth about his "mother". After he confronts his adoptive mother with this information, he leaves to join Claudia's crew. Jacob visits his brother at the survivors' camp at various points over the course of the next thirty years, during which time The Man in Black comes to believe his mother was right in calling humanity inherently corrupt. Despite this, he stays with the crew because they are a means to his finding a way off the island, which involves their use of the island's strange electromagnetic properties. When the woman learns this, she appoints Jacob as the new caretaker of "The Heart of the Island". She then visits The Man in Black at the bottom of a well where he is planning to install a wheel to enable his use of the energy to leave the island. She knocks him unconscious, and then apparently massacres the people in the camp and destroys the well; enraged, The Man in Black kills her with a dagger. Jacob retaliates by attacking his brother and throwing him in the stream leading into the tunnel of light. A cloud of black smoke then emerges from the cave, suggesting it is The Man in Black's consciousness. After a while, Jacob finds The Man in Black's body in a pool nearby and places it in a cave with his adoptive mother's corpse, along with a pouch containing the black and white stones they used in their game as children. It is consequently suggested that the black smoke's ability to take shape of dead people on the island led it to adopt The Man in Black's shape.

In "The Incident", The Man in Black (in his real form) and Jacob converse on the beach as the Black Rock ship approaches in 1867. The Man in Black states that he knows the ship was brought by Jacob, expressing his disapproval of Jacob bringing people to the island, and stating that all they bring is corruption and destruction. He then tells Jacob that he wishes to kill him, but their adoptive mother has prevented The Man in Black from hurting Jacob, so The Man in Black constantly looks for a "loophole" to kill Jacob. Soon after, the Black Rock crashes onto the island and The Man in Black, in the form of the monster, appears and kills everyone on board except Richard Alpert (Néstor Carbonell). He then returns in the form of Isabella (Mirelly Taylor), Richard's dead wife, telling him that they are in hell and tricking him into thinking that Jacob has taken her, The Man in Black reveals that he is the "smoke monster" but tells Richard that he is unable to save Isabella from Jacob. Later, in The Man in Black's form, he frees Richard and gives him a knife to kill Jacob, whom The Man in Black refers to as "the devil"; however, Jacob convinces Richard otherwise. Shortly thereafter, Jacob visits The Man in Black and avows that as long as he (Jacob) is alive, The Man in Black will never leave the island. The Man in Black then vows to kill Jacob and his subsequent replacements.

In February 1988, The Man in Black, as the monster, attacks the six-person crew of a French research vessel. This crew includes Danielle Rousseau (Melissa Farman), who is joined by a time-traveling Jin-Soo Kwon (Daniel Dae Kim). The monster drags the crew's leader, Montand (Marc Menard), under the Temple wall and, after the remaining crew attempts to rescue him, The Man in Black infects them with "the sickness", causing them to "change."

=== After the crash of Oceanic 815 ===
On September 22, 2004, immediately after the crash of Oceanic 815, The Man in Black takes the form of Christian Shephard (John Terry). In the jungle, he encounters and asks the dog Vincent to go wake up his "son" Jack Shephard (Matthew Fox), saying he has "work to do". Vincent then ran until he found Jack, who had just regained consciousness. The following day, the Man in Black, as the monster, rips the pilot (Greg Grunberg) from the cockpit of the plane and kills him, leaving his mangled body in a tree; the pilot's corpse is found by Jack, Kate Austen (Evangeline Lilly), and Charlie Pace (Dominic Monaghan). Three days later, The Man in Black encounters John Locke (Terry O'Quinn) in the jungle as the monster, although he leaves Locke unharmed. Locke later tells Jack: "I've looked into the eye of this Island... and what I saw was beautiful."; Locke later told Mr. Eko (Adewale Akinnuoye-Agbaje) that he had seen a beautiful bright light when encountering the monster for the first time. In the season one finale, "Exodus", The Man in Black attacks a group of the survivors as the monster again; he attempts to drag Locke down a hole, but is stopped by Jack and Kate. The latter tosses dynamite at the black smoke, and he lets go of Locke, the smoke dissipating.

In the following season, The Man in Black confronts Mr. Eko as the monster for his past sins. As Eko stares down The Man in Black, he sees flashing images of his past. In season three, The Man in Black takes the form of Eko's brother, Yemi (Adetokumboh M'Cormack), and demands Eko to repent for his sins. When Eko refuses, The Man in Black briefly disappears, only to return as the monster. He then kills Eko by slamming him repeatedly against nearby trees and the ground. Midway through that season, The Man in Black appears to Juliet Burke (Elizabeth Mitchell) and Kate as the monster; during the encounter, the monster releases a series of bright flashes. He later reappears and it is revealed that he cannot penetrate the sonar fence that surrounds the Barracks of the Dharma Initiative.

In season four, after becoming enraged over the death of his adoptive daughter Alex Rousseau (Tania Raymonde) by mercenary team leader Martin Keamy (Kevin Durand) hired by Charles Widmore (Alan Dale), Ben Linus (Michael Emerson) rushes to a hidden room below his home at the Barracks, which has an ancient stone door covered with hieroglyphs; there, he drains a small pool that summons The Man in Black, as the monster, to brutally assault the mercenaries. As some of the survivors are preparing to leave the island, The Man in Black keeps Claire Littleton (Emilie de Ravin) company in the form of her father Christian Shephard, who tells her that The Others took her son Aaron. When Locke enters a cabin built by Horace Goodspeed (Doug Hutchison) from the 1970s, The Man in Black, still in the form of Christian Shephard, falsely tells Locke that he is giving instructions from Jacob and tells him that he needs to "move the island"; Ben achieves this request.

=== After the crash of Ajira 316 ===
In late December 2007, following Ajira Airways Flight 316's crash on the island, The Man in Black, as Christian Shephard, appears to Sun-Hwa Kwon (Yunjin Kim) and Frank Lapidus (Jeff Fahey), informing them of the time travel undergone by the rest of the Oceanic Six. He then takes the form of the deceased John Locke, whose body was on the plane, and tricks everyone into thinking Locke was brought back to life. Later, Ben tells The Man in Black, who he thinks is Locke, that he must travel to the monster's lair, which lies beneath the Temple wall, to be judged for his complicity in his daughter's death. "Locke" separates from Ben at the Temple and confronts Ben as the monster. After The Man in Black retreats into a vent, he reappears to Ben as Alex's manifestation, warning Ben to follow every word from "Locke", to which he complies. "Locke", Ben, Sun, and Lapidus later arrive at one of The Others' camps, led by Richard Alpert. Once reunited, "Locke" tells Richard that he now has a purpose and instructs Richard to find a time-traveling John Locke so that he can tell him that he must die to bring his friends back to the island; Richard obeys. Later, they return to camp where "Locke" speaks to The Others and tells them that they are going on a trip to see Jacob, from whom they take orders but have never met; Richard reluctantly complies. The next day, "Locke" tells Ben of his plan to kill Jacob while Ben informs "Locke" of Alex's threat, to which "Locke" replies by telling Ben to kill Jacob. After arriving at Jacob's residence at the four-toed statue, the two enter and meet Jacob, who recognizes "Locke" immediately as his supernatural brother. "Locke" notes to his brother that he "found his loophole". An emotional Ben then confronts Jacob by asking him why he has been constantly ignored by him for so many years while also expressing how much he has sacrificed and suffered on the island. "What about me?" Ben asks. However, Jacob gravely looks back at Ben and quietly says: "What about you?" Ben's temper flares and he responds by stabbing Jacob brutally twice in the chest, killing him. "Locke" then kicks Jacob's corpse into a fire pit, which immediately set Jacob completely ablaze. Outside, a group from Ajira 316 sent to protect Jacob, led by Ilana Verdansky (Zuleikha Robinson), arrives and reveal the contents of a giant metal crate from the cargo of the plane: John Locke's dead body.

Following Jacob's demise, "Locke" asks Ben to go outside and tell Richard that he needs to talk to him. Ben inquires as to what they have to discuss, but "Locke" states that it is between himself and Richard. When Ben informs Richard that "Locke" wants to speak with him, Richard becomes furious with Ben and shoves him onto the beach next to Locke's corpse, revealing to Ben for the first time that Locke is indeed dead. Face-to-face with the real, dead John Locke, Ben becomes visibly shocked. Shortly after, Ben is grabbed by one of Ilana's men, who hauls him back into the statue with him, despite Richard's protest. Inside the statue, Ben and four men enter Jacob's chamber; they encounter and point their guns at "Locke". Upon hearing the news of Jacob's death, the men become enraged and fire several shots at "Locke". Moments later, the monster enters the room and overpowers three of the four men, killing them. After the brief firefight, The Man in Black changes back to "Locke" and reveals to Ben his true identity. He explains to Ben that his intention is to "go home". After exiting the statue, "Locke" approaches Richard, who now realizes that "Locke" is actually the man who conned him 140 years ago; Richard is knocked unconscious by "Locke", who then carries him into the jungle to discuss matters. Shortly after, "Locke" releases Richard from captivity and offers him a second chance to join him, but Richard refuses. "Locke" then tracks down a drunk Sawyer (Josh Holloway), who recently lost Juliet and unaware about the true identity of "Locke", and recruits Sawyer to join him. Sawyer only agrees to follow him after "Locke" tells him that he can provide the answer to the most important question there is: "Why are you on the island?" During their walk through the jungle, "Locke" becomes distracted by a young, mysterious blond boy (Jacob in the form of his younger self) and gives chase. Suddenly, Richard appears and frantically informs Sawyer that "Locke" is not who he says he is, but leaves before "Locke" reappears. Once "Locke" returns, Sawyer is now fully aware that "Locke" is someone else entirely and pulls a gun on him, asking him what he is. However, Sawyer lets his guard down after "Locke" prods Sawyer to continue following him because he is "so close now" to learning the truth. The two eventually reach a cave near a ledge, which has writings all over its walls that consist of countless people's names with numbers beside them. "Locke" then reveals to Sawyer that these names represent all the possible "candidates" to replace Jacob as leader of the island. Intrigued, Sawyer joins "Locke" a mission to leave the island.

Later, "Locke" encounters and recruits Sayid Jarrah (Naveen Andrews) to his side. He asks Sayid to deliver a message to The Others at the Temple, ordering them to leave by sundown or they will all be killed. "Locke" also requests that Sayid kill the Temple leader, Dogen (Hiroyuki Sanada), since him being alive keeps The Man in Black from entering the Temple. Building an incentive for Sayid, "Locke" says that he can get Sayid anything he wants, anything in the entire world. Sayid replies that the only thing he ever wanted died in his arms and that he will never see it again. "Locke" seals the deal by rhetorically asking Sayid, "What if you could?" At sundown, after Sayid kills Dogen, "Locke" enters the Temple as the monster and kills all of The Others remaining inside. After this, he gathers The Others that joined him, along with Sayid, Kate, and Claire. Soon after, "Locke" sends Sawyer on a recon mission to Hydra Island, but the latter instead makes a deal with Charles Widmore to help him destroy The Man in Black and leave the island. Sawyer eventually returns from Hydra Island and reports back to "Locke"; he tells him that all the Ajira passengers are dead, and Widmore and his team are there where they have set up a sonar fence, hiding the deal he concocted with Widmore. After Jin is taken from camp by Widmore's group so that he can assist them in the assassination of The Man in Black, the latter travels to Hydra Island with Sayid. "Locke" then confronts Widmore and declares "war"; he returns to the main island while Sayid spies on Widmore's team to learn why Jin was taken. After Sayid returns to the main island with Desmond Hume (Henry Ian Cusick), who was recently brought back to the island against his will by Widmore, "Locke" leads Desmond to a very old well. After explaining its origins, "Locke" throws Desmond down the well. Upon returning to his camp, Jack's group—this time led by Hurley (Jorge Garcia)—arrives where they finally meet The Man in Black.

After meeting each other for the first time, "Locke" and Jack converse privately about past events and inevitable events; "Locke" also explains to Jack that the real John Locke had to be dead before assuming his form. Later, "Locke" instructs Sawyer to retrieve a sailboat, the Elizabeth, to ferry him and his followers to Hydra Island to board the Ajira plane parked on the island and to also dock it at a meeting point. He also instructs Sayid to kill Desmond at the bottom of the well, but Sayid instead lets him live. When Sawyer and Kate arrive at the coast on the Elizabeth, Kate expresses her doubts about departing the island with "Locke". Sawyer then reveals his plan to secretly escape The Man in Black's command and leave the island with Jack, Hurley, Sun, and Lapidus. The seven soon meet up and sail away while "Locke" deals with other matters. However, Jack is later ordered off the Elizabeth by Sawyer after the former expresses that he doesn't believe that they are meant to leave the island. An angered Sawyer watches as Jack reclaims his position as a man of faith and refuses to run by jumping into the ocean. Jack swims back to the island and washes up on the beach where "Locke", now aware of Sawyer's betrayal, arrives and reunites with Jack. Suddenly, a mortar is fired on the orders of Widmore, landing on the shore, throwing Jack and others through the air. "Locke" immediately runs to Jack, who is prone in the sand, and carries him inland while another missile hits land.

That night, Jack wakes up in a boat and discovers that he is on Hydra Island with "Locke" and Sayid to regroup with the others. Unbeknownst to them, Widmore broke his deal with Sawyer and locked the group in a cage to protect them from The Man in Black's imminent arrival. Moments after Sawyer's group is caged, "Locke" attacks Widmore's camp as the monster while Jack arrives and frees his captive friends. Shortly after, "Locke" arrives solo at the Ajira Flight 316 site and enters the plane to inspect before he can depart with the others. Inside, he examines exposed wiring leading to a pack of C-4 explosives left by Widmore; he disarms and takes them for himself. Once Jack's group arrives at the site, "Locke" explains to them that Widmore wants them all together in a confined space so that he can kill them all, showing them the C-4 he found as evidence, and then tells them that their new plan is to leave the island via Widmore's submarine because they can't be sure the plane does not have any more booby traps. The group eventually arrive at the dock where there is no sign of any defense guarding the submarine. Before boarding, "Locke" asks Jack to reconsider his decision not to leave, explaining that whoever told Jack to stay had no idea what he was talking about. Jack turns and says, "John Locke told me I needed to stay", and abruptly pushes Locke off the dock and into the water. Suddenly, Kate is shot in the shoulder by Widmore's team, who have arrived at the tree line; a shootout between the two parties ensues. In the midst of the firefight, everyone escapes except for Claire, who realizes she has been left behind again, and "Locke". Underwater, Jack discovers that "Locke" planted the C-4 in Jack's backpack with a timer attached to it to kill them all at once. Sawyer then attempts to disarm the bomb, but Jack tells him not to since he has figured out that "Locke" can't kill the candidates himself and wants them to all die together in a "nice enclosed space". A frantic Jack then pleads Sawyer to let the timer run down to zero, assuring the group that the bomb will not go off. However, Sawyer apologizes and quickly pulls the wires out, and, as a result, the timer accelerates. To save his friends' lives, Sayid grabs the bomb and runs to the back of the submarine, but is instantly killed once the bomb detonates. The bomb's explosion then causes fatal damage to the submarine, forcing the group to escape. However, the aftermath results in the deaths of Sun and Jin while Jack, Kate, Sawyer (unconscious), and Hurley wash up on the main island together (separated from a still alive Lapidus) in an emotional state, mourning the deaths of the Kwons. "Locke", still at the pier, senses that not all of them are dead and leaves Claire to "finish what [he] started".

The next day, "Locke" rows back to the main island. Widmore, who showed up at the Barracks shortly after the destruction of his submarine, encounters and intercepts Ben as he was preparing to leave to destroy the Ajira plane with a backpack full of C-4; Widmore explains to Ben that he already loaded the plane with explosives. When questioned further, Widmore said that he had been invited back to the island by Jacob himself, but before he could elaborate further, Widmore spots "Locke" and hides in Ben's secret room. Moments later, "Locke" reunites and once again recruits Ben, who then reveals Widmore's whereabouts after being promised to have the island "all to [himself]" by "Locke" once he leaves. In Ben's closet, "Locke", after threatening Widmore, obtains information from him: Widmore brought Desmond back to the island because of his "unique resistance to electromagnetism" and is "a measure of last resort" to be used in case "Locke" manages to kill Jacob's remaining candidates; "Locke" realizes that this fail-safe could let him accomplish his final plan. Suddenly, Ben repeatedly shoots and kills Widmore with a handgun, avenging Alex's death. That night, after discovering that Desmond escaped the well and was not killed by Sayid, "Locke" reveals his final plan to Ben: "Locke" will find Desmond, who will then help him "destroy the island".

Eventually, the duo find Desmond, who is forced to join "Locke". The three soon cross paths with Jack's group on their way to "The Heart of the Island". A vengeful Jack then approaches "Locke" and vows to kill him, shocking everyone with this statement; however, "Locke" is unfazed. After having Desmond remove the cork from the center of "The Heart of the Island", the island proceeds to shake and crumble. Satisfied, "Locke" leaves the cave, but Jack attacks him, drawing blood, making The Man in Black realize that he just made himself mortal. In a last attempt to leave the island for good, "Locke" knocks Jack out and runs for the cliffs where the Elizabeth is moored off the side of the main island near the cliffside cave. Minutes later, Jack regains consciousness and catches up to "Locke" on the cliffs now having a chance to kill him; the final battle ensues. During the intense fight, The Man in Black gains the upper hand and fatally stabs Jack in the abdomen. However, before he can finish him off, telling Jack that he will "die for nothing", Kate suddenly appears and shoots The Man in Black in the back. Despite this, the island continues to rumble, convincing The Man in Black that it will indeed sink. Finally, he tells them that they're "too late", but Jack makes him realize his defeat by kicking him off the cliff to his death.

== Development ==
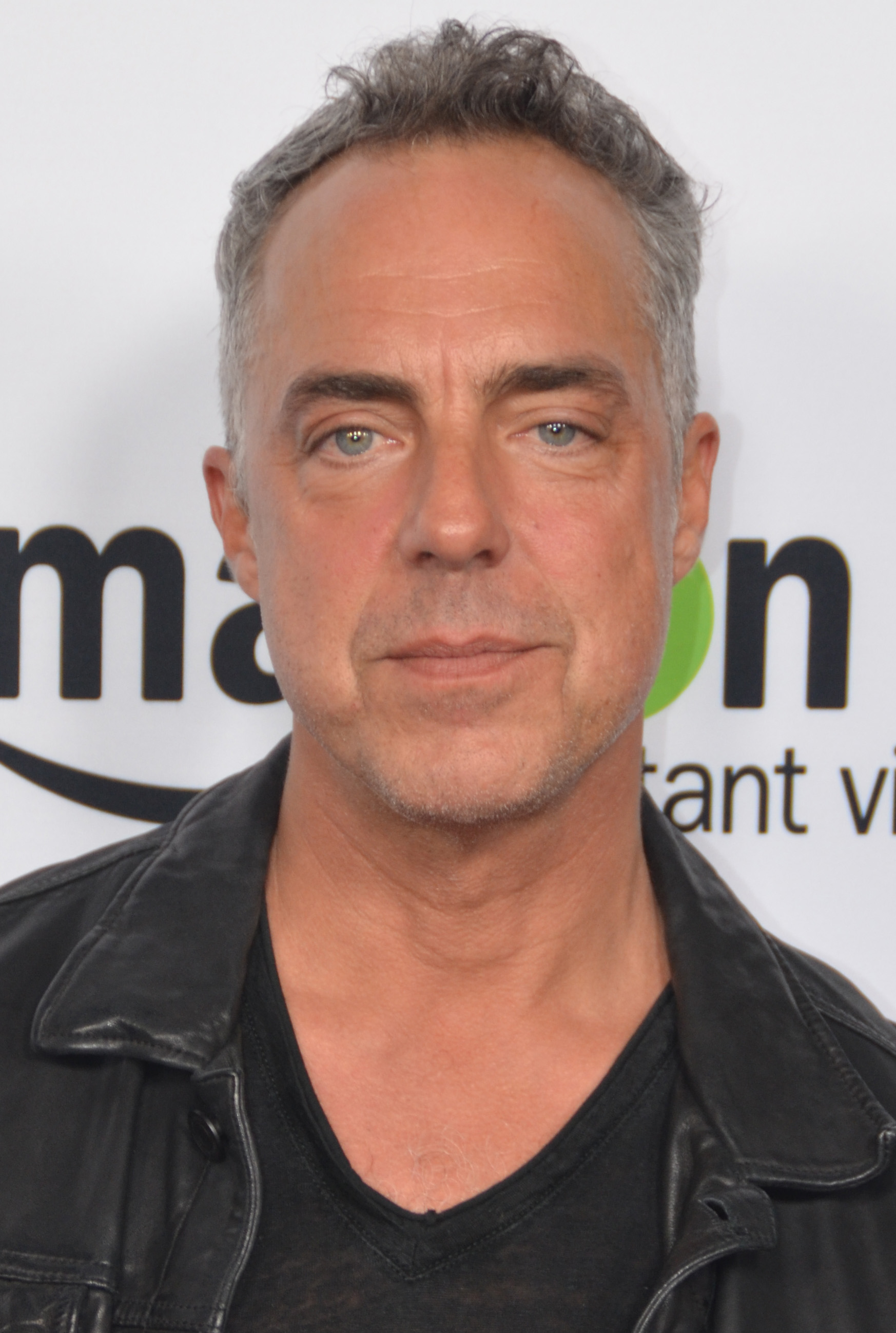
Titus Welliver portrays the real form of The Man in Black

The monster is established in Lost in the first episode, "Pilot". The producers' initial plan was for the monster to represent the id, in a manner similar to the "id monster" from the 1956 film Forbidden Planet. This idea was changed by the end of season one, when the character Danielle Rousseau describes the monster as a "security system" that protects the island. This plan was continued into season five, when Rousseau's husband, Robert, describes the monster as a security system that guards the island's Temple. It was not until season six that it was established that the monster was also The Man in Black.

The original appearance of The Man in Black as the monster was the first major plot twist of the sixth-season premiere, "LA X", which changed how the viewers and characters perceived the island. In "Pilot", Rose comments: "I keep thinking, there was something familiar about it." The producers had difficulty finding the right sound for the monster to make and eventually settled on the receipt printer from a New York City taxicab, which is why Rose, from The Bronx, New York, finds it familiar.

Prior to the revelation of the monster as The Man in Black, one theory suggested that the monster was a cloud of nanobots, similar to Michael Crichton's novel Prey. In the March 21, 2008, edition of the Official Lost Podcast, executive producer Damon Lindelof revealed that manifestations of the monster did indeed include Yemi and the medusa spider that bit Nikki and Paulo.

In reference to Jacob and The Man in Black, Lindelof stated that, regarding the scene in "Pilot, Part 2" where Locke explains to Walt Lloyd the premise of backgammon using the concept of light and dark, he and fellow co-creator J. J. Abrams had planned for those two sides to eventually be personified by two individuals.
