= Hugo "Hurley" Reyes =

Fictional character of the TV series Lost

- Lost character
- Jorge Garcia as Hugo "Hurley" Reyes
- First appearance: "Pilot"
- Last appearance: "The New Man in Charge"
- Created by: Jeffrey Lieber; J. J. Abrams; Damon Lindelof
- Portrayed by: Jorge Garcia
- Centric episode(s): "Numbers" "Everybody Hates Hugo" "Dave" "Tricia Tanaka Is Dead" "The Beginning of the End" "There's No Place Like Home (Parts 1, 2 & 3)" "The Lie" "Everybody Loves Hugo"

In-universe information
- Species: Human
- Gender: Male
- Occupation: Fast food cashier Protector of the Island
- Relatives: David Reyes (father); Carmen Reyes (mother); Diego Reyes (brother)
- Nationality: American
- Former residence: Los Angeles, California, United States

Hugo "Hurley" Reyes is a fictional character on the ABC television series Lost, played by Jorge Garcia. For most of the show's run, Hurley served as the show's comic relief, but occasionally, and most notably in the final season, he was shown in a more serious light. In the series finale, he takes over as the Island's protector from Jack Shephard (Matthew Fox) then takes Benjamin Linus (Michael Emerson) as his adviser, the same way Jacob (Mark Pellegrino) took Richard Alpert (Nestor Carbonell). He was cited as an unlikely hero among the show's characters.

His storylines mostly involved his mental illness, his belief that his lottery win is a curse to those around him, his relationship to The Numbers, and his short-lived relationship with Libby (Cynthia Watros).

== Character biography ==
=== Prior to the crash ===
Hurley is Mexican-American and lives in Los Angeles with his mother (Lillian Hurst). His father left the family when he was a child, at which point Hurley began overeating. He was involved in an accident in which a deck collapsed as he stepped onto it, killing two people. Even though there were too many people on the deck prior to his arrival, Hurley feels great guilt because of his weight.

He sinks into a depressive state, so his mother checks him into a psychiatric institution. There, he creates an imaginary friend called Dave (Evan Handler) and meets Leonard Simms (Ron Bottitta), a patient who keeps mumbling the numbers 4, 8, 15, 16, 23 and 42. Hurley's condition eventually improves; he leaves the institution and he resumes his job at a fast-food restaurant.

He uses the numbers 4, 8, 15, 16, 23 and 42 in the lottery, and wins a record jackpot of $114m. Hurley immediately begins experiencing bad luck: his grandfather Tito dies of a heart attack, the priest at Tito's funeral is struck by lightning, there is a fatal fire at a shoe factory he owns, the house he buys his mother burns down; his brother, Diego, is dumped by his girlfriend for a waitress; and Hurley is wrongfully arrested for being a drug dealer. Insurance and legal settlements mean these events only add to his net worth but as his wealth increases, so does his bad luck.

Hurley suspects the numbers he used to win the lottery are cursed, so he visits the institution again to speak with Leonard. He tells Hurley the man who could explain the mystery of the numbers, Sam Toomey, lives in Australia. Before Hurley can travel to Australia, his father (Cheech Marin) returns to the family. He convinces Hurley to go to a psychic to cure his curse, but Hurley discovers his father has paid the psychic to lie.

Once in Australia, Hurley visits Sam Toomey's wife (Jayne Taini), who reveals that Sam was driven to suicide to escape his constant bad luck. Hurley had to go back to Los Angeles because it was his mother's birthday. Halfway through the return flight, however, the plane he was on hits turbulence, splits in mid-air, and crashes on an island in the South Pacific.

=== After the crash ===
==== Season 1 ====
During the chaos post-crash, Hurley looks after Claire, a pregnant woman, at the request of Jack, a doctor. Hurley helps the group ration the remaining food and water from the plane; he slips Claire an extra ration for the baby. Hurley moves into the caves with some of the other survivors, where he discovers a pack of golf clubs and decides to create a golf course to ease the stress and tension of being stranded. When Claire claims to have been attacked one night, Hurley creates a census and discovers that Ethan, a fellow survivor, was never on the flight. When Hurley looks at the maps that Sayid recovered from Rousseau, Hurley discovers a sheet of paper containing the cursed numbers (4, 8, 15, 16, 23, 42). He treks into the jungle in search of Rousseau, with Jack, Sayid and Charlie in pursuit. After being separated from the rest of the group, Hurley eventually encounters Rousseau, who reveals that the numbers brought her to the island, and agrees that they are cursed. That night, during a heart-to-heart, he tells Charlie about his wealth. Charlie does not take him seriously, and storms off. One morning, Rousseau arrives on the beach and warns the camp that the Others are coming. She then leads Hurley, Jack, Kate, Locke and Arzt to a wrecked slave ship called the Black Rock, which contains some dynamite. After Arzt dies when dynamite he is holding explodes, Hurley blames himself and his bad luck.

==== Season 2 ====
Hurley is brought into the hatch the survivors have found, and is given the task of checking the food inventory, and brings Rose to help. Hurley, believing everyone will hate him, attempts to blow up the food with dynamite, but Rose manages to talk him out of it. Hurley decides to distribute the food freely, explaining there is no feasible way to ration it. Shortly after the arrival of the tail-section survivors, Hurley takes a liking to Libby and the two bond. However, Sawyer eventually discovers Hurley has secret food stash, and blackmails him into helping him track a tree frog that is annoying him. One morning, he and Libby go jogging together, where Hurley tells her about the food stash. The two of them destroy it together. At a cliff-top, his imaginary friend Dave convinces him that he is still at the institution in a coma and the only way to "wake up" is to jump off the cliff. Hurley is about to jump when Libby stops him and makes him see reason. The two kiss before returning to camp. He then plans a surprise picnic for her, but forgets to bring blankets. Libby offers to retrieve them from the Hatch; however, after collecting them she is shot and killed by Michael. When Hurley learns of Libby's shooting he rushes to her side. After speaking at Libby's funeral, he agrees to help Michael rescue his son from the Others, who he has blamed for Libby's shooting. After trekking across the jungle Jack exposes Michael as a traitor. Hurley confronts Michael, and later Jack, for bringing them along on a mission when he knew it to be a trap. Eventually, they are ambushed by the Others, who tie, gag and blindfold them before bringing them to a pier. Hurley is released and instructed to return to his camp and tell his people that they can never come to this part of the island.

==== Season 3 ====
As Hurley approaches the beach camp, he encounters Desmond, who mentions a speech by Locke about rescuing Jack, Kate and Sawyer. When Locke gives this speech later, Hurley suspects Desmond of being able to see the future, so he and Charlie devise a plan to draw the truth from him by getting him drunk. Later, Hurley discovers an old Dharma Initiative van. He, Sawyer, Jin and Charlie attempt to fix it, culminating in Sawyer and Jin pushing the van down a steep hill so Hurley can jumpstart it. Just as they are about to crash, Hurley defies his curse and miraculously starts the van. Later on, a cocky Sawyer bets against the camp that he can beat their best player in Ping Pong. Hurley defeats Sawyer, causing him to refrain from using nicknames for a week. Later, Hurley and Sawyer discover Nikki stumbling out of the jungle, then collapsing. He mistakes her for dead and finds Paulo in the jungle in the same situation. After failing to find a certain cause of death, Hurley gives them a funeral, but fails to notice Nikki open her eyes seconds before being buried. Hurley cons Sawyer into being decent to his fellow castaways as Hurley believes Sawyer to be the camp's new leader until Jack returns. The next day, Desmond asks Hurley to join him, Jin and Charlie on a hike. On their trek, they notice a parachutist bailing out of her helicopter, prompting them to head inland. They find Naomi hanging from a tree, and the four cut her loose. The four carry her back to the beach, where they hide her in Hurley's shelter. Later, Hurley and the others are shown Jack's plan to deter the Others from carrying out their kidnapping. Just as Charlie and Desmond set off to the Looking Glass, Hurley offers to join them, but his offer is declined. He instead accompanies Claire to the radio tower. As Sawyer and Juliet head back to the beach, Hurley again offers his services, but again his help is denied. Hurley heads for the van and drives it onto the beach, killing an Other, giving Sawyer and Juliet time to deal with the rest.

==== Season 4 ====
Hurley and Jack speak on the radio, and Jack tells Hurley they were successful and that rescue is imminent. However, Desmond returns to shore with news of Charlie's death, devastating Hurley. On the way to Jack, Hurley falls behind and runs after the group in a panic, only to find Jacob's mysterious cabin. Hurley sees inside and runs away, screaming for help, only to bump into Locke. Locke and Hurley agree that the freighter Jack called is not rescue and become determined to stop Jack. When the survivors are reunited, Locke suggests the group take refuge at The Others' village, an offer Jack refuses. The group divides, with Hurley following Locke. Hurley travels with Locke's group and quickly becomes disturbed by Locke's ideas and methods, especially when Locke takes freighter member Charlotte hostage. Once they reach the village, Hurley and Sawyer become roommates, which irks Sawyer. When playing RISK with Sawyer and Locke the phone alert rings, so he hides in Ben's house with everyone. Later Hurley follows Ben's instructions and flees the house with everyone else. Once Ben catches up to them, Locke and Sawyer argue over who is keeping Hurley when Sawyer decides he's going back to Jack and the beach. Hurley convinces them to stop arguing and goes with Locke and Ben to find Jacob. Afterward, Hurley follows Ben and Locke to the Orchid Station, where Ben and Locke must move the Island. Sawyer and Jack find him; Ben tells Jack and his companions to leave the Island. Hurley follows them to the helicopter, where Lapidus is waiting. Hurley, Jack, Kate, Sawyer, Sayid, Sun, Aaron and Lapidus then fly off the Island, towards the freighter. Whilst in the air the island vanishes and the freighter explodes, forcing an emergency landing into a raft. Penelope Widmore's rescue boat rescues them, and Hurley, along with the rest of the Oceanic Six, move on to Sumba, where civilization awaits them.

After leaving the island, Hurley and the other survivors are transported by cargo plane to a military base. Oceanic Airlines holds a press conference to tell the survivors' story in which they lie that there were no other survivors from the crash. Later he returns home to his mansion to find a surprise birthday party thrown by his parents. Hurley's father shows him his birthday present – Hurley's old Camaro. When he gets in the car, he notices that the mileage is set to the Numbers. This greatly disturbs Hurley, and he accuses his father of making a joke. His father denies it, but Hurley is so disturbed that he runs away. When Sun has her baby, Hurley arrives in Korea to congratulate her. Later, Hurley sees Charlie in a convenience store, he drives off, and leads the police on a long chase. Hurley is arrested and brought to the police station, where he looks onto the two-way mirror and sees Charlie drowning with the words "THEY NEED YOU" written in marker on his hand. The mirror breaks and water come pouring out, and Hurley screams for help. The police officer sarcastically suggests that he can put Hurley in a mental hospital, which Hurley quickly jumps at. Hurley then goes to Santa Rosa Mental Health Institute where he is approached by a man named Matthew Abbadon, who claims to be an attorney for Oceanic Airlines. He asks Hurley if he would like to transfer to a nicer place with an ocean view, but Hurley denies the offer, not wanting to ever see the ocean. Abbadon asks Hurley if anyone else is still alive. Hurley then freaks out and calls for a nurse. When Hurley goes to point him out, he has left the room. When Hurley is sitting on the grounds one day, he is approached by Charlie, who tells him that "They need you." Later, Jack comes to see Hurley to check he will not reveal the truth about the plane crash. Hurley suggests that the Island wants them back, and that they should listen. Hurley's mental condition deteriorates, and his doctor contacts Jack, who comes and visits him. Hurley insists to Jack that none of them really made it off the island and that they are all dead and tells Jack that someone will be coming to visit him too. Later, Hurley is visited by Sayid who is intent on taking Hurley from the mental institution to some place safe.

==== Season 5 ====
Hurley is accompanied by Sayid after he is broken out of the mental institution and taken to an apartment building, only to discover there are dangerous men inside waiting for Sayid to enter. Sayid fights with them, but gets shot by a tranquilizer dart in the process. Hurley speeds down the road with an unconscious Sayid, but is pulled over. He then sees a vision of Ana Lucia Cortez (Michelle Rodriguez), who informs him of how to avoid the police. He returns to his house and confesses to his parents what actually happened on the island. Hurley's father takes the unconscious Sayid to Jack and orders Jack to stay away from Hurley. While alone in his house, Hurley is approached by Ben Linus, who asks Hurley to come with him so they can go back to the island, to which Hurley declines. Hurley runs outside of his house, confessing to the murders that Sayid committed, and is arrested. Ben later has his lawyer get the charges dropped against Hurley, who is released from jail. Hurley leaves jail in a taxi, and rides along with Jacob who asks Hurley why he does not want to return to the Island. Jacob explains to Hurley that he is not cursed, and leaves a guitar case with Hurley. Hurley takes Jacob's advice and goes to LA X to leave on the flight with Sun, Jack, Sayid, Kate and Ben. During the flight, the plane encounters severe turbulence and a bright flash of light and disappears. Hurley finds himself on the Island's lake, where he is saved by Jack. The two then wake up Kate nearby and witnesses Jin, wearing a Dharma jumpsuit, pointing a rifle at them. Jin drives them to an open field where Sawyer explains to them that the year is 1977. Sawyer alters the recruitment records to allow Hurley, Jack, and Kate in as members; Hurley is assigned work as a chef. Jack and Daniel Faraday agree that dropping a hydrogen bomb will destroy the Island and prevent Oceanic Flight 815 from crashing in 2004. Hurley, Miles, and Jin then take Kate, Jack, Juliet, Sawyer, and Sayid to the construction site where the Swan station is being built. Hurley stays behind in their van to treat a wounded Sayid as the hydrogen bomb is detonated.

==== Season 6 ====
After the detonation of the bomb, the survivors are transported forward to 2007, still on the Island. Jacob encounters Hurley again, telling him to take a dying Sayid to the Temple to save him. Once they arrive at the Temple, they are almost killed by the native inhabitants until Hurley claims that Jacob had sent them. To prove it, he shows the guitar case to the Others' leader Dogen (Hiroyuki Sanada), which contains an ankh with a scroll from Jacob in it. Later, Jacob's spirit again visits Hurley and instructs him to acquire Jack and walk to a lighthouse. Outside, Jacob reappears to Hurley, congratulating him on bringing Jack to the lighthouse as needed for Jack to realize that he is important to the Island. Jacob also divulges that he needed to get Jack and Hurley away from the Temple because "someone bad" was arriving there. The next morning Jack tells Hurley that they need to return to the Temple. Hurley stalls, until Richard Alpert, leads them to the ship The Black Rock and attempts to commit suicide using the dynamite. After this fails they head back to the beach where they meet Ben, Ilana (Zuleikha Robinson), Miles, Sun and Lapidus. The next day, he follows a still suicidal Richard into the jungle. He tells Richard that the spirit of Isabella, Richard's wife from 1867, had sent him. Hurley acts as an intermediary between the two, giving Richard the long-awaited opportunity to apologize to his wife. Richard tearfully thanks Hurley after Isabella's spirit leaves.

Later, Richard decides to pack dynamite and explode the Ajira Airline to prevent the Man in Black from escaping. Hurley is initially on his side, but after Michael Dawson's spirit visits him and tells him he must prevent his plans, he tells Richard not to, or that they will all die. When Richard refuses, Hurley secretly walks to the Black Rock and defuses the remaining dynamite. An irate Richard splits their group up by taking Ben and Miles with him to look for other explosives, while Hurley, Jack, Sun, and Lapidus go to talk with the Man in Black. The whole group walks on to the Ajira plane, as the Man in Black claims that they will all leave on it. However, the Man in Black turns the group around after discovering explosives in the plane, insisting they take the submarine instead. The Man in Black tricks them by placing a bomb in Jack's bag, wanting to kill them all. Sayid grabs it and runs to the far end of the sub to sacrifice himself, despite Hurley's plea. The bomb explodes, and the sub begins to sink. Hurley, Kate, Jack, and Sawyer escape, but Jin and Sun drown. The four eventually arrive at a campfire where Jacob is waiting. Jack volunteers to take Jacob's place and be the next protector of the Island. Jack goes on to defeat the Man in Black, and takes Hurley and Ben with him to the heart of the island to return the light to the island. Jack knows this will kill him, so passes on his guardian role to Hurley. In tears, Hurley wonders what to do next, and asks Ben to be his adviser in protecting the Island. Ben gladly accepts the offer, and the two take up the post of guarding the Island. Hurley is last seen speaking to Walt in a Dharma van outside the Santa Rosa Mental Hospital about offering him a job when they return to the island.

In the afterlife, Hurley describes himself as being the luckiest guy alive. He owns Mr. Cluck's Chicken franchise, and is well known for his philanthropy work. One day Hurley is eating at a Mexican restaurant and Libby sees him and sits next to him. She then tells him that she thinks that they are connected and could be soul mates. Dr. Brooks then comes over to the table and takes Libby back to Santa Rosa Mental Hospital. Later Hurley is eating at Mr. Cluck's and runs into Desmond, who advises Hurley to seek her if he believes she may be right. After making a generous donation to Santa Rosa, Hurley is allowed to see Libby again. Libby then tells Hurley that when she first saw him on one of his Mr. Cluck's Commercials, she had a vision of the Island, with him being in it, and both of them being in Santa Rosa together. Hurley thinks she is crazy, but invites her on a date anyway. On the beach, Hurley sets out a picnic for Libby. They kiss and Hurley also remembers his life on the Island, and assures Libby she isn't crazy. In the final scene outside of a church where the survivors of Oceanic 815 meet, Hurley has a brief exchange with Ben. In the exchange Hurley tells Benjamin that he was a "real good number two," while Benjamin replies that Hurley was a great number one.

== Development ==
Jorge Garcia was the first actor the producers knew they were going to cast. In his audition to play Sawyer, the producers recognized him from an episode of Curb Your Enthusiasm which had aired the previous night. They thought he was spectacular, but didn't fit the role of Sawyer, so they created Hurley for him. In a flashback to his childhood in "Tricia Tanaka Is Dead," Hurley is played by Caden Waidyatilleka. Hurley appears in three mobisodes: "The Adventures of Hurley and Frogurt", "Arzt and Crafts", and "Jin Has a Temper Tantrum".

== In popular culture ==
The alternative rock band Weezer named their 2010 album Hurley after the character Hugo Reyes. The album's cover is a picture of actor Jorge Garcia, who portrays the character in the show.

Garcia guest-starred on a season 6 episode of the CBS show How I Met Your Mother, "Blitzgiving", which had references to Lost. When Marshall asks for a random phone number, Jorge Garcia's character immediately shouts out the numbers 4, 8, 15, 16, 23, 42. Later, Jorge's character says, "I feel like I was on that island for eternity", referencing his curse; both Hugo and Stephen, the character that Jorge Garcia plays on How I Met Your Mother, are cursed. In Jeremy Garelick's comedy The Wedding Ringer, Garcia portrays the character Lurch, who poses as one of Josh Gad's groomsmen. In the film's finale, the groomsmen are sat on a plane headed towards Tahiti for a weekend trip following the failed wedding. On the plane, Lurch claims, "I've got a bad feeling about this flight", a reference to Lost.

The storyline involving Hurley's usage of the numbers 4 8 15 16 23 42 in a lottery has led to the sequence becoming a popular choice for lottery players. This issue came to particular attention when a record Mega Millions jackpot drawing on January 4, 2011, matched four of the six numbers (three plus the mega ball), resulting in several thousand people who played the numbers winning at least $150 each.
