= Jack Shephard =

Fictional character of the TV series Lost

- Lost character
- Matthew Fox as Jack Shephard in 2008.
- First appearance: "Pilot (Part 1)"
- Last appearance: "The End"
- Created by: Jeffrey Lieber; J. J. Abrams; Damon Lindelof
- Portrayed by: Matthew Fox; John O'Hara (Young)
- Centric episode(s): "Pilot (Part 1)" "White Rabbit" "All the Best Cowboys Have Daddy Issues" "Do No Harm" "Man of Science, Man of Faith" "The Hunting Party" "A Tale of Two Cities" "Stranger in a Strange Land" "Through the Looking Glass (Parts 1 & 2)" "Something Nice Back Home" "There's No Place Like Home (Parts 1, 2 & 3)" "316" "Lighthouse" "The Candidate"

In-universe information
- Species: Human
- Gender: Male
- Occupation: Spinal surgeon
- Relatives: Christian Shephard (father); Margo Shephard (mother); Ray Shephard (grandfather); Claire Littleton (half-sister); Aaron Littleton (nephew); Sarah (ex-wife)
- Nationality: American
- Former residence: Los Angeles, California, United States
- Alma mater: Columbia University College of Physicians and Surgeons

Doctor Jack Shephard is a fictional character and the protagonist of the ABC television series Lost, played by Matthew Fox. Lost follows the journey of the survivors of Oceanic Flight 815 on a mysterious island and their attempts to survive and escape, slowly uncovering more of the broader island history they are a part of. The character was conceived by creator J. J. Abrams, though the direction of storylines owes more to co-creator Damon Lindelof and fellow showrunner Carlton Cuse. Abrams, the creator of Lost, once told Entertainment Weekly, "Jack Shephard may be the greatest leader in any television series." Actor Matthew Fox had some influence on the character during the course of the series' production; for example, Fox's own tattoos were incorporated into the character's backstory. Although at an early stage in the show's development the character was intended to die in the pilot, the writers soon changed this plan, and Jack became the show's main character from its pilot episode onwards.

The de facto leader of the crash survivors in the show's first four seasons, Jack is very much a man of science, the antithesis of man of faith John Locke. However, his experiences in season five mold Jack into a believer, to the point of becoming John Locke's spiritual successor in the final season. His leadership role culminates in his briefly taking over as protector of the island from its immortal guardian, Jacob, and being the one to engage one of the series' villains, The Man in Black (who has ironically taken on Locke's appearance), in a climactic battle to the death. Jack's storylines have included the exploration of his relationships with various love interests: fellow survivor Kate Austen and Juliet Burke, initially a member of the mysterious Others, who are the series' main antagonists for the majority of its run. Other key relationships in the show involve Claire Littleton, who he discovers is his half-sister; Hurley and Sayid Jarrah as fellow survivors who challenge him; and Sawyer, his rival for the affections of Kate, even as Sawyer calls him the closest thing he has to a friend.

== Characterization ==
Prior to the crash of Oceanic Flight 815, Jack was born into a successful family, with aspirations of following in his father's footsteps. He attended Columbia University and graduated from medical school a year earlier than his classmates. In September 2004, Jack's mother, Margo, (Veronica Hamel) orders him to find Christian, who has exiled himself to Australia, and bring him back. Jack goes to Sydney and finds that his father has died. Once Jack identified his father's body, he made arrangements to bring him home. Jack boards Oceanic 815 bound for Los Angeles on September 22, 2004, with his father's casket in the cargo hold.

On the island, Jack plays a key role in the survival of his fellow survivors in the immediate aftermath of the crash, instructing others to help those with injuries and using his medical background to assist the wounded. The survivors look to Jack as their leader; however, he is reluctant to embrace the position and repeats his father's rationale that he does not "have what it takes". Exhausted from tending the wounded, attempts to rescue drowning survivors and sleep-deprived, Jack begins chasing (seeming) hallucinations of his father in the jungle. He drops his skepticism when he finds his father's coffin but it is empty. Struggling to cope with demands made by the castaways, he meets John Locke in the jungle, who provides some guidance for Jack's leadership. Jack returns to the beach camp and gives a speech on how they are going to live on the island and tells them about the caves; one part of his speech—"live together, die alone"—becomes a mantra amongst the survivors. Through his medical tending and visibility within the camp, Jack quickly develops many personal relationships with the castaways, most notably finding a romantic interest in Kate Austen, a right-hand man in Hurley Reyes (Jorge Garcia) and a mutual respect for former military torturer Sayid Jarrah (Naveen Andrews).

Throughout the series, it has been stated numerous times that Jack is a natural leader. These things have been demonstrated many times by his ability to think quickly and analyze crisis situations. Jack intentionally represses fear and anxiety, usually in order to remain strong for other people, as he is the one they turn to during crises. Initially, he rejects claims of fellow survivors, such as Rose Nadler (L. Scott Caldwell) and John Locke, who believe they are on the Island for a reason and that the Island has mystic properties. He does this to not give his fellow survivors false hope. On the Island, Jack also seems to repress his feelings for Kate Austen. However, after escaping from The Island, Jack and Kate admit their love, move in together, and raise Aaron, Claire's son.

Jack's habit of repression sometimes does flare out, usually in his propensity to become violent when he is enraged. He is also prone to become highly obsessive and willing to do anything to help the survivors, even if it's to his detriment. This aspect was noted by his father when he was a child, suggesting that Jack avoid being a hero because he doesn't have "what it takes" to keep a level head when things go wrong. Jack is, deep down, a very caring person and has sacrificed himself for his crash-mates several times. After being rescued, he sinks into alcoholism and drug abuse out of severe depression. He blames himself for leaving almost all the fellow survivors behind while he was safely rescued. This leads to his delusions that his father is still alive and a suicide attempt, which indicate that Jack has not been completely able to cope with what happened on the island. Digital Spy's Ben Rawson-Jones marked a "difference in the characterization of Jack [who] has become known as the trustworthy, honest type since Oceanic Flight 815 crashed, so his blatant lies about the island under oath were definitely dramatic".

After being rescued and falling into depression, Jack was visited by Locke one last time, to convince him to return to the island. Though he failed, Jack's outlook underwent a fundamental change. He began to believe in fate and destiny. When Juliet asked Jack why he eventually did return to the island, Jack told her "because I was supposed to". Jack's faith leads him to sacrifice himself to prevent the island's destruction. He believed that saving the island was what he was "meant to do" and the only thing that could give him the peace he did not find when he was off-island.

== Development ==
In the original outline of Lost, Jack was going to be killed halfway through the first episode. Lost co-creator J. J. Abrams was interested in Michael Keaton for the role, as Abrams wanted to work with him. However, scripts were never even sent to him, as the character was made into a regular, and Keaton wasn't interested in a series. The producers felt that if the audience became attached to the character during the first episode, and then he was killed, they might resent the show. His death was meant to shock the audience so they would never know what would happen next. The role ended up going to Matthew Fox, who was "very excited" about it, as it was the genre and tone he was looking for.

=== Tattoos ===
For story purposes, the tattoos on Jack's arm read: "He walks among us, but he is not one of us." However, Matthew Fox already had the tattoos when he started on Lost. The producers considered putting make-up over them but, instead, decided to keep them and just fit them in with the plot.

According to Assistant Professor Xinping Zhu of Northeastern University, the tattoo is made up of four Chinese characters (simplified Chinese: 鹰击长空; traditional Chinese: 鷹擊長空; pinyin: Yīng jī chángkōng; "鹰", hawk; "击", strike or attack; "长", long; "空", space or sky) from a poem written by Mao Zedong in 1925, and the Lebanese Phalangist symbol. Fox's tattoo translates to "Eagles high up, cleaving the space".

In an interview, Fox said that, for him, getting a tattoo is a "pretty intense experience" and something he would not do in the "spur of the moment". He thought it was a "really cool idea" for Jack to have tattoos. Since Fox used tattoos to represent memories or meaningful events in his life, the writers took a similar approach when dealing with Jack's tattoos.

== Reception ==
Critical and viewer reception has been highly positive for Matthew Fox's Jack Shephard with some calling him one of the best tv show protagonists of the 2000s. BuddyTV praised Matthew Fox's lead role performance in "Through the Looking Glass" as "Emmy worthy" The San Diego Union-Tribune's Karla Peterson praised Fox's work in "Something Nice Back Home", The Palm Beach Post's Kevin Thompson "thought [that] Matthew [Fox] did a nice job conveying a wide range of emotions—scared, haunted, frustration, jealousy, just to name a few" in the same episode.

Matthew Fox won a Satellite Award for Best Actor in a Dramatic Television Series for his role as Jack in 2004. He was nominated for a Golden Globe in 2006 for Best Actor in a television series – Drama and a Television Critics Association award in 2005 for Individual Achievement in Drama. He has also won two Saturn awards, including Best Actor on Television in 2005 and Best Actor in a Television Program in 2007. In 2010, Fox received a Primetime Emmy Award nomination for Outstanding Lead Actor in a Drama Series.
