= There's No Place Like Home (Lost) =

- Lost episodes
- The climax of the season finale, in which Ben Linus turns the frozen wheel in order to move the Island.
- Episode nos.: Season 4 Episodes 12, 13 & 14
- Directed by: Jack Bender; Stephen Williams
- Written by: Carlton Cuse; Damon Lindelof
- Production codes: 412, 413 & 414
- Original air dates: May 15, 2008 (Part 1); May 29, 2008 (Part 2) (Note: Prior to being broadcast, "There's No Place Like Home: Part 2" was known as "There's No Place Like Home: Parts 2 & 3" in ABC's press material. The home release of season four, as well as ABC's official Lost website, refers to it as "There's No Place Like Home: Part 2". Furthermore, the home release states that there are fourteen episodes in season four and "There's No Place Like Home" is counted as three episodes.)
- Running time: 126 minutes

Guest appearances
- Malcolm David Kelley as Walt Lloyd; L. Scott Caldwell as Rose Nadler; Jeff Fahey as Frank Lapidus; Nestor Carbonell as Richard Alpert; Kevin Durand as Martin Keamy; Anthony Azizi as Omar; John Terry as Christian Shephard; Sonya Walger as Penny Widmore; Alan Dale as Charles Widmore; François Chau as Dr. Edgar Halliwax; Alex Petrovitch as Henrik; Starletta DuPois as Michael's mother; Veronica Hamel as Margo Shephard; Andrea Gabriel as Nadia Jazeem; Byron Chung as Woo-Jung Paik; June Kyoko Lu as Mrs. Paik; Lillian Hurst as Carmen Reyes; Cheech Marin as David Reyes; Michelle Forbes as Karen Decker; Susan Duerden as Carole Littleton

Episode chronology
← Previous "Cabin Fever"	Next → "Because You Left"
- Lost season 4

"There's No Place Like Home, Parts 1, 2 & 3" is the season finale of the American Broadcasting Company's fourth season of the serial drama television series Lost, consisting of the 12th through 14th episodes. They are also the 84th through 86th episodes of the show overall. The three constituent episodes were split into two broadcasts; "Part 1" first aired on May 15, 2008, and "Part 2", serving as the two-hour season finale of the fourth season, first aired on May 29, 2008, on ABC in the United States and on CTV in Canada. The episodes were written by executive producers/show runners Carlton Cuse and Damon Lindelof; "Part 1" was directed by co-executive producer Stephen Williams, while executive producer Jack Bender directed "Part 2". The episode's title is a reference to The Wonderful Wizard of Oz.

The narrative takes place in late December 2004, 100 days after the crash of Oceanic Flight 815. The survivors of the crash team up with the Others, natives of the island where the plane crashed, to confront the mercenaries from the freighter Kahana, who have come to the island. Following this, some of the survivors escape the island, which is afterwards moved by Ben Linus (Michael Emerson). Flashforwards show the first actions of the Oceanic Six, those who are rescued, after returning home in January 2005, and their lives in late 2007. The cliffhanger from the previous season finale, "Through the Looking Glass," is resolved by revealing John Locke (Terry O'Quinn) to be dead and in the coffin that Jack Shephard (Matthew Fox) visits in that episode.

Production and broadcast of the fourth season were interrupted by the 2007–2008 Writers Guild of America strike and following its resolution, the writers were unable to compress the remainder of season four into the five allotted episodes and the season finale was extended by one hour. Subsequently, the production schedule was compressed and post-production work was completed in three weeks, instead of the usual two months.

The second part was watched by 12 million Americans, making Lost the most watched show of the week, for the first time in the show's history. Both parts were met with critical acclaim. Matthew Fox's acting in his flashforward scenes was praised, as was Michael Giacchino's musical score. The episode's editing was nominated for both a Primetime Emmy Award and Eddie Award.

== Plot ==
=== Part 1 ===
In flashforwards to January 2005, the Oceanic Six—Jack Shephard, Kate Austen (Evangeline Lilly), Sayid Jarrah (Naveen Andrews), Sun-Hwa Kwon (Yunjin Kim), Hugo "Hurley" Reyes (Jorge Garcia) and Claire Littleton's (Emilie de Ravin) infant, Aaron—arrive in Honolulu, where Hurley and Sun are reunited with their parents; Jack with his mother; and Sayid with his girlfriend, Nadia Jaseem (Andrea Gabriel). In the ensuing media circus, a press conference is held, where they lie about everything that has happened on the island; claiming that they are the only living survivors and that Kate gave birth to Aaron on the island. Sometime later, Hurley's dad (Cheech Marin) gives Hurley his newly rebuilt 1970s Camaro, at a surprise birthday party. Hurley, however, becomes panicked and runs away when he notices that the car's odometer displays the numbers. In Seoul, South Korea, Sun visits her father and informs him that she used the money from her settlement with Oceanic Airlines to buy a controlling interest in his company because she blames him for her husband's, Jin-Soo Kwon (Daniel Dae Kim), death. In the final flashforward, Jack eulogizes his deceased father, Christian Shephard (John Terry). After the ceremony, Carole Littleton (Susan Duerden), Claire's mother, reveals to him that Claire is his half-sister; as she walks away, she smiles at Aaron in Kate's arm, oblivious to the fact that she is staring at her grandson.

On December 30, 2004, following the events of "Cabin Fever", Jack and Kate follow the tracking signal on the phone given to them by Frank Lapidus (Jeff Fahey), who dropped it onto the survivors' beach from a helicopter. They encounter James "Sawyer" Ford (Josh Holloway), Aaron and Miles Straume (Ken Leung); Kate returns to the beach with Miles and Aaron. Jack and Sawyer meet up with Lapidus at the helicopter, but decide to rescue Hurley, who is with Ben, the mercenaries' target, before leaving for the freighter. Meanwhile, Sayid arrives at the beach on the freighter's Zodiac boat and informs the survivors that they must go to the freighter as soon as possible because the mercenaries' secondary objective is to kill everyone on the island. He and Kate go after Jack and Sawyer, but are captured by Richard Alpert (Nestor Carbonell) and the rest of the Others. After unsuccessfully attempting to convince his crush, Charlotte Lewis (Rebecca Mader), to leave the island, Daniel Faraday (Jeremy Davies) starts ferrying people to the freighter. Sun, Jin, and Aaron arrive at the boat, only to discover a bomb, consisting of a large amount of C4 explosives, on board.

Meanwhile, in their quest to move the island, Ben, Locke and Hurley arrive at the Dharma Initiative Orchid station, which is disguised as a greenhouse. Ben sends Locke to the real part of the station and surrenders himself to Martin Keamy (Kevin Durand) and the other mercenaries from the Kahana, who had previously arrived. A final montage shows the Oceanic Six and Ben in their respective predicaments.

=== Parts 2 & 3 ===
On the island, Jack and Sawyer meet up with Hurley and Locke at the Orchid station. Jack and Locke once more argue about the nature of the island; Locke implores him to lie about the island once he and the other survivors leave. At the helicopter, Kate, Sayid, and the Others free Ben by ambushing and killing the mercenaries, except Keamy, who feigns death. In return, the Others allow Kate, Sayid and the other survivors to leave the island on the helicopter. Ben returns to the Orchid, where he gets in a hidden elevator with Locke.

Inside the underground part of the Orchid station, Ben puts every metal item he can find into a small compartment at the back of the room, while Locke watches the orientation video for the Orchid. On the tape, Pierre Chang (François Chau) begins to discuss time travel involving "negatively charged exotic matter" when the VCR malfunctions and the tape rewinds itself. Shortly, Keamy arrives and tells Locke that if he (Keamy) dies, the C4 on the freighter will detonate, due to a remote trigger linked to a heart rate monitor he is wearing. Regardless, Ben kills Keamy with no remorse or sympathy for those on the boat, in order to avenge his adopted daughter Alex (Tania Raymonde), whom Keamy executed. Ben seals and then activates power to the compartment he had loaded with metal items, blowing a hole in the back of it. Ben, now wearing a parka, tells Locke that whoever moves the island is forced to leave it and never come back; Ben must do it so that Locke can stay and lead the Others. Locke then goes to the Others, who welcome him home. Ben climbs through the hole and down a rocky tunnel beyond it into a frozen chamber, cutting his arm in the process. He then turns a very large metal wheel. As he completes the rotation, an eerie sound and white-yellow light soon envelop the entire island. Ben disappears, only to reappear several months later in the Sahara Desert (as seen in "The Shape of Things to Come").

Jack, Kate, Sayid, Sawyer, Hurley, and Frank Lapidus leave the island on the helicopter, but discover a fuel leak on board. In order to lighten the helicopter, Sawyer jumps out after whispering something in Kate's ear and kissing her. The helicopter makes it to the Kahana in the nick of time; they refuel it, fix the leak, pick up Desmond Hume (Henry Ian Cusick), Sun, Aaron and Kate leave seconds before the C4 detonates. The resulting explosion kills Michael Dawson (Harold Perrineau), who is told that "he can go now" by a vision of Christian Shephard. The status of Jin, who is still on the boat, is left uncertain as a cliffhanger. Sawyer swims back to the island and laments the destruction of the boat with Juliet Burke (Elizabeth Mitchell). The people on the helicopter decide to return to the island, but as they approach, they see the island vanish in the white-yellow light. With nowhere to land, the helicopter runs out of fuel and the survivors are forced to ditch into the ocean. They drift in a rescue raft for several hours, where Hurley suggests that Locke succeeded in moving the island, but Jack refuses to believe it. Jack convinces the other survivors that they must lie about their experiences on the island, to protect those left behind.

That same night, the survivors are rescued by Penny Widmore (Sonya Walger), Desmond's girlfriend, with whom he is finally reunited. In keeping with the faked wreckage of Flight 815 found in the Java Trench, the Oceanic Six are dropped off near the island of Sumba, where they are found by local villagers.

In flashforwards to late 2007, following those in "Through the Looking Glass", Jack, Kate and Walt Lloyd (Malcolm David Kelley) all recount stories of being approached by Jeremy Bentham, the dead man in the coffin. Kate has a dream in which Claire tells her not to bring Aaron back to the island. In London, England, Sun confronts Charles Widmore (Alan Dale), Penny's father, who sent the Kahana to the island, and tells him that they have common interests involving the island. After finding out that Bentham is dead, Sayid breaks into the mental hospital where Hurley is staying and convinces him to go "somewhere safe". Jack returns to the funeral parlor, where he is confronted by Ben, who says that the island will not allow Jack to return without everyone else who left joining him. This includes Jeremy Bentham's body, who is finally revealed to be John Locke.

== Production ==
=== Cast ===
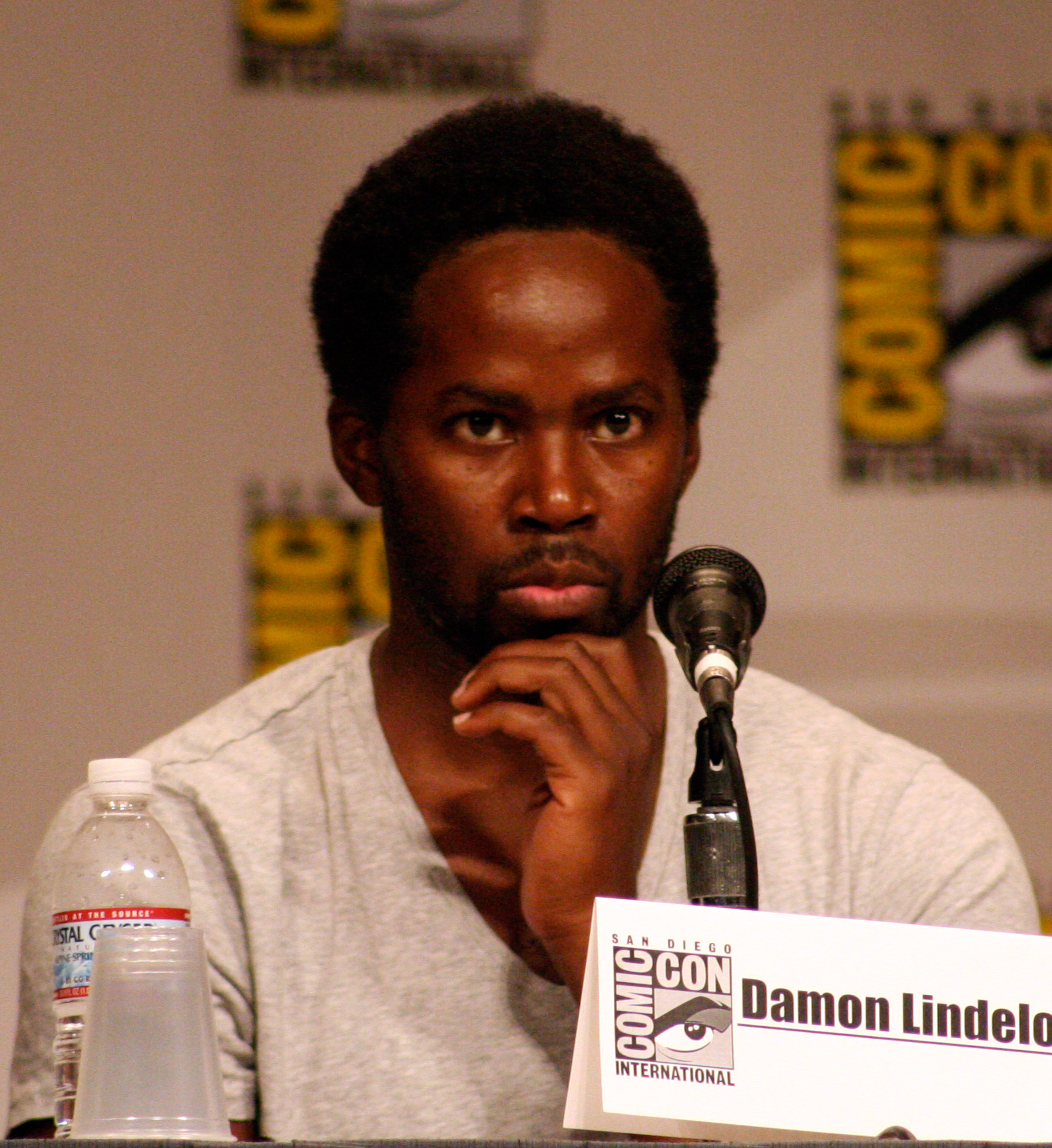
This episode features the last appearance of Harold Perrineau as a main cast member.

The episode features the last appearance of actor Harold Perrineau, whose character Michael dies in an explosion, as a main cast member. The character of Michael was absent for the entire third season of Lost and returned midway through the fourth season in "Ji Yeon." Perrineau was disappointed that he was brought back to the show only to be killed and that Michael does not get a chance to reunite with his son, Walt, saying, "there are all these questions about how [the writers] respond to black people on the show ... Walt just winds up being another fatherless child. It plays into a really big, weird stereotype and, being a black person myself, that wasn't so interesting." The fate of Jin, who is also on the freighter when it explodes, is left uncertain. Actor Daniel Dae Kim was arrested for driving under the influence of alcohol, which prompted speculation about his future on the series, due to co-stars Michelle Rodriguez (Ana-Lucia Cortez) and Cynthia Watros (Libby) leaving Lost after DUI arrests. This episode also marks Malcolm David Kelley's first appearance on the show since the third season, excepting a computer effects shot of the actor in "Meet Kevin Johnson". Kelley's character, Walt, was "benched" for the majority of the second and third seasons because the actor's growth was disproportionate to the amount of time that has passed on the island. The writers got the idea to show him in flashforwards in his older form while writing "Through the Looking Glass".

=== Writing ===
Throughout season four, Jack and Locke have argued about the true nature of the island, whether it had supernatural powers and how Oceanic Flight 815's crashing could be part of the survivors' destiny. Upon witnessing the island vanish at the end of this episode, Jack finally realizes that Locke was right. Jack then takes Locke's advice and convinces the other survivors that they must lie about the island once they are rescued. This is further emphasized by the fact that the same music is played during Jack and Locke's conversation and when the survivors encounter Penny's boat. Lindelof has also stated that Sawyer's message to Kate in the helicopter is a "critical plot point" in that it ultimately leads to the end of Jack and Kate's relationship once they return home (as seen in "Something Nice Back Home"). In terms of plot structure, the main action scene of the episode, where the Others and the survivors confront the mercenaries, was deliberately placed at the beginning of "Part 2" so that the remainder of the episode could focus on character development. Furthermore, all of the present time plotlines are interconnected by the C4 bomb on the freighter, even though the writers themselves have called the use of the bomb as a plot device "ridiculous". It was necessary, however, in order to keep both Michael and Jin from leaving the freighter with the other survivors.

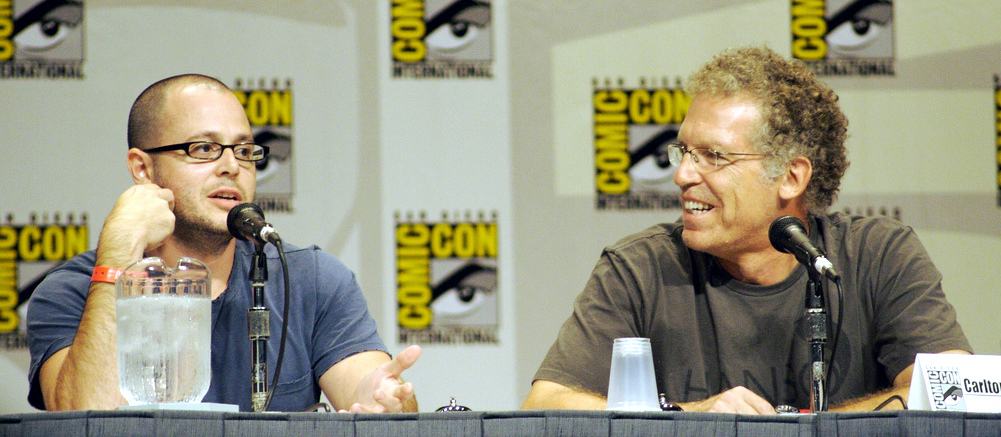
Writers Damon Lindelof (left) and Carlton Cuse (right) were unable to shorten the script and the finale was extended by an hour.

The final scenes of the episode, particularly Ben turning the wheel, Penny and Desmond's reunion and the last shot of Locke in the coffin, were kept secret in order to prevent spoilers from leaking. The phrase "Frozen Donkey Wheel" was coined to describe not only the wheel that Ben turns, but also the final scene in which Locke is shown to be in the coffin. Only six people knew that Locke was in the coffin—actors Matthew Fox, Michael Emerson and Terry O'Quinn; writers Lindelof and Cuse, and Jack Bender, the director.

==== Writers' Strike ====
The Writers Guild of America went on strike on November 4, 2007 after the writers had only finished the first eight episodes of the season. Show runners Lindelof and Cuse wanted to hold the eight episodes until they were able to produce more of the season, but ABC decided that the eight episodes would be aired from January to March, regardless of whether any more episodes were produced in the 2007–2008 season. After the resolution of the strike, ABC decided to produce five more episodes for the fourth season. This conflicted with ABC's earlier plan to broadcast seasons four, five and six in uninterrupted blocks of sixteen episodes each. Despite this, ABC prioritized scheduling Grey's Anatomy, Ugly Betty and Lost's returns all for April 24. The decision left the three unproduced episodes of season four "in the bank" to be used later in seasons five and six.

After the resolution of the strike, Lindelof said that the effect of the strike on the fourth season would be minimal and the season's story arc would be completed as originally intended. However, the first draft of the second part of "There's No Place Like Home," was 85 pages long, approximately 30 pages longer than a typical one hour Lost script. Lindelof and Cuse found that they could not compress the second half of the season finale into one episode and actually wanted to expand it. Subsequently, the show runners went into "advanced talks" with executives at ABC and convinced them to produce one of their episodes "in the bank", thereby extending "There's No Place Like Home: Part 2" to two hours. However, this caused a scheduling problem with Grey's Anatomy and Ugly Betty, which were both already scheduled to air their season finales on May 22, 2008. To allow Lost to have a two-hour finale, ABC moved it one week later to May 29, 2008 and aired both parts of "There's No Place Like Home" back-to-back. Ultimately, this left thirty-four episodes to be split over seasons five and six, which will each have seventeen episodes. Another effect of the strike was that the backstories of the so-called "freighter folk", i.e. Faraday, Miles and Charlotte, had to be pushed back to season five. As such, the writers dropped hints to Charlotte's backstory in "There's No Place Like Home".

=== Filming ===
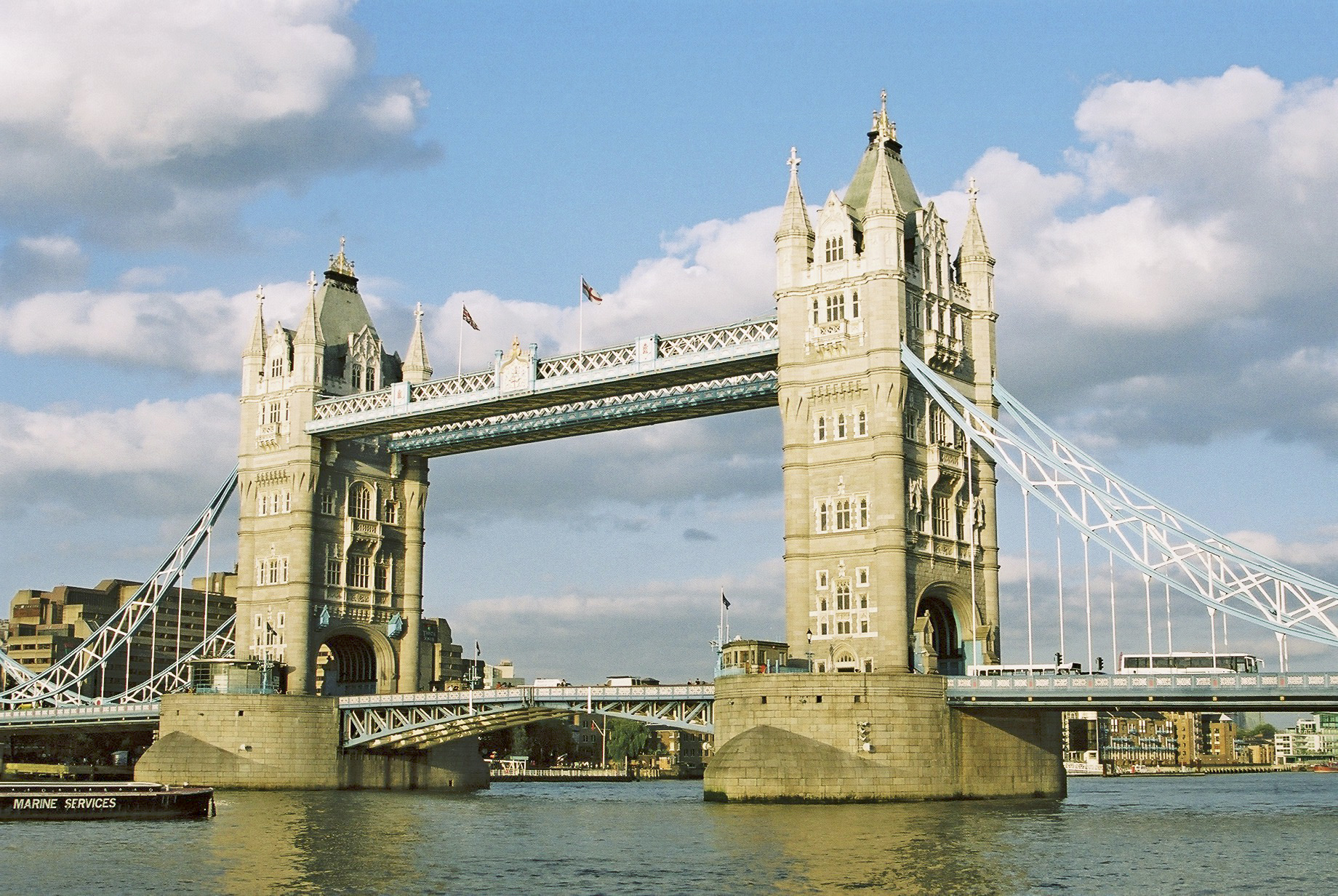
Scenes were filmed on location in London near Tower Bridge.

"There's No Place Like Home: Part 2" was filmed in approximately three and a half weeks; filming concluded three weeks before the episode aired. Scenes set on the exterior of the freighter were shot on an actual freighter named Kahana. Several actors and crew members stayed aboard the freighter while filming "There's No Place Like Home", as well as other episodes of the fourth season. Director Jack Bender and several others became seasick after only spending a short time on board. The helicopter featured in several scenes never actually took off from or landed on the Kahana because the rotors were too large and would hit the boat if used. Instead, the rotors were added using digital effects and the helicopter was raised and lowered by a crane onto the deck of the freighter while it was docked. Filming took place during this and the footage was intercut with scenes of Michael dealing with the bomb; thus the helicopter is never seen landing on the freighter. Other scenes set on the helicopter were shot on a soundstage in front of a green screen, where actress Yunjin Kim lost her voice from screaming. Furthermore, the first prop bomb was deemed to be too small and the amount of C4 was doubled, even though the original amount of C4 depicted was sufficient to blow up the freighter. The set for the exterior of the Orchid station was constructed in the Manoa valley on the island of Oahu, near Paradise Park, a defunct tourist attraction, which served as the Dharma Initiative Hydra station in the first few episodes of the third season. The exterior elevator for the Orchid station did not actually move and a camera trick was used to simulate movement. The scene in which Sun confronts Widmore was filmed on location, in London, because actor Alan Dale (Widmore) was appearing as King Arthur in Spamalot there at the time. Dale was not made aware of the plot of the episode, saying that "the wording, the title and all the headings on the scripts were changed. Only [he] knew they were the Lost scripts, along with the director." Sonya Walger declared that despite being a guest star on the show since the second season's finale, the rescue scene was the first time she had met Matthew Fox and Evangeline Lilly, as most of her scenes were either only with Henry Ian Cusick or alone. Two alternate endings were shot for the episode in order to minimize the risk of the real ending being leaked. Both versions were shown on Good Morning America on May 30, 2008. In the first alternate ending, Sawyer is in the coffin and in the second, Desmond is in the coffin. Overall, it took four editors approximately three weeks to edit the second part of the finale, which under normal circumstances would take two months.

== Reception ==
=== Ratings ===
"There's No Place Like Home: Part 1" was watched by 10.962 million American viewers, of which 6.391 million were ages 18 to 49, ranking nineteenth for the week in total viewers and eighth among viewers age 18 to 49. The episode was watched by 1.296 million Canadian viewers, ranking fifteenth for the week. It was also watched by 914,000 viewers in the United Kingdom and by 464,000 viewers in Australia, making it the thirtieth most watched program of the night, a feat that David Dale of The Sun-Herald thought proved that "there's hope for the world". "There's No Place Like Home: Part 2 " was watched by 12.303 million American viewers, of which 6.453 million were ages 18 to 49, making it the most watched show of the week overall and in the 18 to 49 demographic. It was the first Lost episode to lead the weekly ratings. The episode was watched by 1.448 million Canadian viewers, ranking second for the week. It was also watched by 1.166 million viewers in the United Kingdom and by 603,000 viewers in Australia.

=== Critical response ===
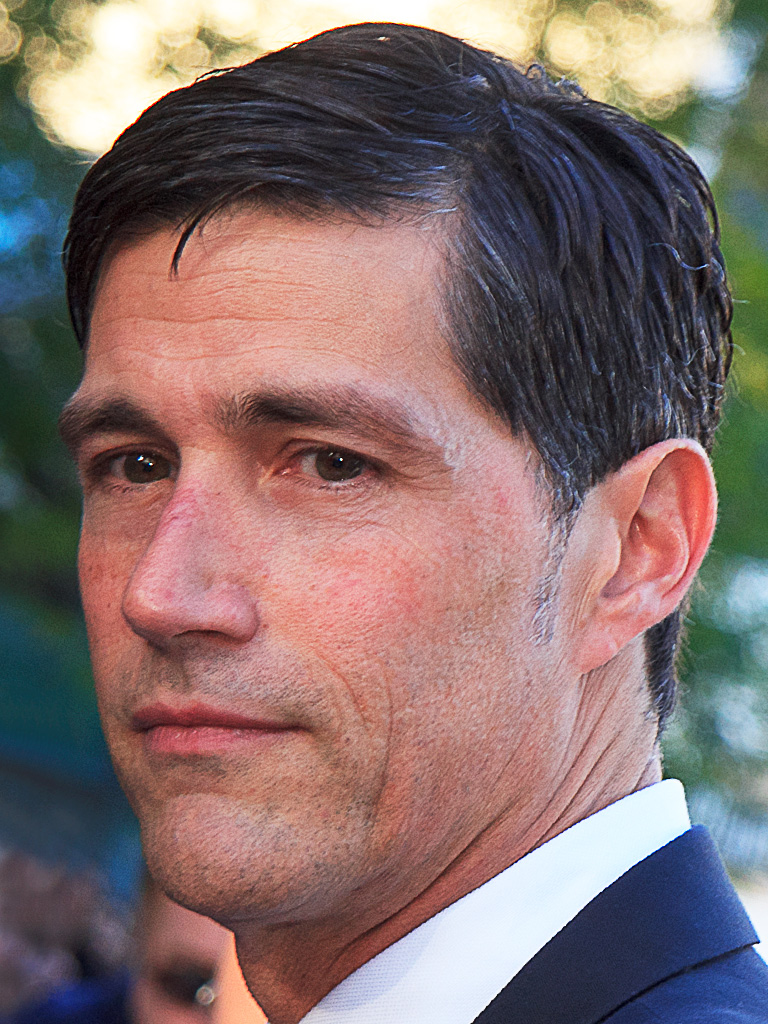
Matthew Fox received praise for his portrayal of Jack in the episode's flashforwards.

Patrick Kevin Day of the Los Angeles Times praised Michael Giacchino's musical score, writing that "I'm reminded of the heights of emotion this series can evoke." Jarett Wieselman of the New York Post thought that the finale's split and two-week break was "not cool", but asked "how brilliant was Sun's smackdown on her bad daddy?". Alan Sepinwall of The Star-Ledger wrote that "when Lost is at its best … it manages to balance revelations … with great character moments. I don't know that I'd put this one in the pantheon (again, a lot of it was set-up for … [Parts 2 & 3]), but it was definitely in the spirit of what I love about the show." Kristin dos Santos of E! praised the chemistry between Naveen Andrews and Andrea Gabriel, who play Sayid and Nadia, respectively. Chris Carabott of IGN gave Part 1 of the three-hour finale a 7.9. He commended the music and called it "a good opening to what should be an exciting season finale"; however, the lack of suspense in favor of set-up was cited as the reason for the modest rating. However, Carabott gave Parts 2 & 3 a perfect 10 review, tying with other perfect-10 episodes such as "The Constant" and "Through the Looking Glass". He stated that "Not a moment is wasted in this brilliantly paced and well-executed conclusion to what has been a fantastic season." Dan Compora of SyFy Portal called "Part 1" "an excellent setup episode [with] fast pace, important revelations, and nearly a full utilization of the cast". Compora decided that "certain characters work much better in very small doses … a little bit of [Hurley] goes a long way [and] it was nice to see Jack featured without completely dominating an episode." Oscar Dahl of BuddyTV summed up Part 1 as "very good", but said that the opening flashforward in which the Oceanic Six are reunited with their families was anticlimactic and "although each flashforward scene had minor and major revelations, it felt patched together and a little sloppy, like Lindelof and Cuse had all this ground to cover in their quest to link all the action up to the final scene of season 3 … That said, the flashforward scenes all played out exceedingly well." Daniel of TMZ welcomed the return of Richard (on the island) and gave the episode an "A", saying that it had "more than a few fantastic scenes. All the flashforward scenes tonight were right on the money as far as I was concerned." Jay Glatfelter of The Huffington Post "really liked this episode" and concluded that it "definitely showcased the new breath of life the fourth season gave to the show."

Matthew Fox received much praise for his performance in the scene in which his character Jack reacts to the revelation that Claire is his half-sister. Jarett Wieselman of the New York Post called this "brilliant acting", while Alan Sepinwall of The Star-Ledger said that "Fox played Jack's anguish beautifully" and called this scene a contender for "Fox's single best moment in the history of the show". Kristin dos Santos gave Fox "mad props" and Chris Carabott of IGN said that "Fox hasn't been given much of an opportunity to stretch his acting muscles this season but he gives a great performance [in this scene]."

Robert Bianco of USA Today said that "a great season of Lost ended with a suitably great finale, which … ended with the … whoa-inducing discovery that Locke was the man in the casket. Didn't see that coming—and I can't wait to see what this terrific TV series has coming next." Matthew Gilbert of The Boston Globe wrote that "the episode was dynamic and busy enough as it relied heavily on action-adventure… but the finale wasn't as mind-bending as [the third] season's farewell, during which we received the show's first flash-forward." Alan Sepinwall of The Star-Ledger enjoyed the triple-length "There's No Place Like Home", but ranked it in the middle of his list of the season's episodes from best to worst and decided that "'There's No Place Like Home" (both parts) played fair with the audience 100 percent, answered [many] questions … and yet … I feel ever so slightly disappointed by all of this." He also found the special effects "looked much shoddier than usual" and praised the score. Frazier Moore of the Associated Press thought that "it might be the most rewarding, deliciously challenging episode in the history of this mystical ABC serial." Dan Compora of SyFy Portal wrote that "Part 2" "was perhaps the most action-packed, meaningful episode of television I've watched all year. The pace was excellent, and the revelations were plentiful." Compora also wrote that "though the pace was considerably slower, the finale delivered in a big way … it was [not a letdown, being] well written and well directed in its own right."

=== Awards ===
The second part of "There's No Place Like Home" was nominated for Outstanding Single-Camera Picture Editing for a Drama Series for the 2008 Creative Arts Emmy Awards, however it lost to the pilot episode of Breaking Bad. The episode as a whole was nominated by the American Cinema Editors for Best Edited Miniseries or Film – Commercial Television at the American Cinema Editors Awards 2008, losing to 24: Redemption.
