= Happily Ever After (Lost) =

- Lost episode
- Desmond (Henry Ian Cusick) suffers the effects of Widmore's (Alan Dale) experiment.
- Episode no.: Season 6 Episode 11
- Directed by: Jack Bender
- Written by: Damon Lindelof; Carlton Cuse
- Production code: 611
- Original air date: April 6, 2010
- Running time: 43 minutes

Guest appearances
- Alan Dale as Charles Widmore; Dominic Monaghan as Charlie Pace; Jeremy Davies as Daniel Faraday; Sonya Walger as Penny Widmore; Sheila Kelley as Zoe; Fionnula Flanagan as Ms. Hawking; Fisher Stevens as George Minkowski; Fred Koehler as Seamus; Sundra Oakley as Lawyer; Steve Boatright as Mike; Kayren Butler as Doctor; Ben Cain as MRI tech; Jonathan Arthur as Simmons; Hannah Bell as Nurse; Grisel Toledo as Nurse Tyra; Haley Williams as Widmore's assistant; Gerard Elmore as Guy; Christopher McGahan as Tech

Episode chronology
← Previous "The Package"	Next → "Everybody Loves Hugo"
- Lost season 6

"Happily Ever After" is the 11th episode of the sixth season of the serial drama television series Lost and 114th episode overall. The episode aired on April 6, 2010, on ABC in the United States. The episode was written by showrunners and executive producers Damon Lindelof and Carlton Cuse and directed by Jack Bender. The episode is centered on Desmond Hume.

In 2007, Desmond Hume (Henry Ian Cusick) undergoes Charles Widmore's (Alan Dale) experiment and interacts with his "flash-sideways" timeline counterpart where Desmond, Charlie Pace (Dominic Monaghan), and Daniel Widmore (Jeremy Davies) experience visions of their actual-universe counterparts.

"Happily Ever After" was watched by 9 million American viewers and received acclaim by critics and audiences alike.

== Plot ==
=== 2007 (original timeline) ===
After being shot by Ben Linus (Michael Emerson), (Note: As shown in the episode "Dead Is Dead".) Desmond Hume (Henry Ian Cusick) awakens to discover that Charles Widmore (Alan Dale) has brought him back to the Island. Desmond attacks Charles, who tells him the Island is not done with him, and that unless Desmond helps him, everyone he loves will be gone forever. He has his team prepare an electromagnetic test, which kills a team member in the path of the toroids as they set up. Desmond is bound to a chair and locked in with the toroids as the test is run. After Desmond survives the test, he agrees to help Charles. As Charles' team leads him away, they are ambushed by Sayid (Naveen Andrews), who takes Desmond away with him.

=== 2004 (flash-sideways timeline) ===
Desmond arrives in Los Angeles on the orders of his employer, Charles Widmore. After helping the heavily pregnant Claire Littleton (Emilie de Ravin) get her luggage, Desmond goes to Charles' office. Charles informs Desmond that his son Daniel Widmore (Jeremy Davies), a classical musician, has invited the rock band Drive Shaft to perform with him that evening. The band's bass guitarist, Charlie Pace (Dominic Monaghan), has been arrested for possession of drugs, and Charles requires Desmond to collect and deliver him to Daniel's event.

Upon their meeting, Charlie tells Desmond that he recently almost died after swallowing a bag of heroin, (Note: As seen in "LA X".) and in his near-death state experienced a vision in which he was with a blonde woman. He causes Desmond to crash his car into a marina, and while Desmond attempts to rescue Charlie from the water, he experiences a vision of Charlie drowning, with the words "NOT PENNYS BOAT" written on his hand. The two are taken to a hospital, where Desmond has a series of visions of a stranger named Penny (Sonya Walger) during an MRI test.

After discharging himself from the hospital, Desmond apologizes to Charles' wife Eloise Widmore (Fionnula Flanagan) for being unable to ensure the attendance of Drive Shaft. Nearby employees are discussing the guest-list for Daniel's concert, and Desmond hears the name Penny mentioned. Eloise refuses to let him see the list, and warns him off of pursuing his inquiries.

As Desmond prepares to leave, he is stopped by Daniel, who tells him that he recently saw a red-haired woman in a local museum that he strongly felt he already knew and loved. Daniel states that after the encounter, he made a series of notes in his journal which a mathematician friend has identified as advanced quantum mechanics, a topic he knows nothing about. Daniel shows his notes which contain a graph with imaginary time on one axis, and hypotheses that the world as he and Desmond are experiencing is not their correct path, and something like a nuclear explosion has altered their realities. Desmond questions Daniel as to whether he intends to set off a nuclear bomb, to which Daniel replies he believes he already has.

Daniel tells Desmond that Penny is his half-sister, and tells him where he can find her. Desmond locates Penny running the steps of an athletics stadium, and introduces himself. After shaking Penny's hand, Desmond passes out. When he awakens, he asks Penny out for coffee, an invitation which she accepts. As his driver George Minkowski (Fisher Stevens) takes him to their meeting point, Desmond asks him to acquire the flight manifest for Oceanic 815, the flight which brought him to Los Angeles. When Minkowski asks why he needs it, Desmond responds, "I just need to show them something".

== Reception ==
"Happily Ever After" was met with critical acclaim. Review aggregate website Metacritic gave the episode a score of 93 out of 100, indicating "Universal Acclaim". The score was up on the previous week's score of 72. Emily VanDerWerff of Los Angeles Times gave the episode a perfect score, calling it "a sublime episode of television." Jeff Jensen of Entertainment Weekly also rated "Happily Ever After" perfect, deeming it "the episode we’ve been waiting for all season." IGN's Chris Carabott stated "while not necessarily on the same level as "The Constant" or even "Flashes Before Your Eyes", "Happily Ever After" does deliver many game changing moments that will alter the way we view the alternate universe from this point forward." Overall, he gave the episode a rating of 9.5. James Poniewozik of Time also praised the episode, stating "I am finally fully confident that [the alternate universe] means something, and this leaves me feeling very good about the remaining episodes."

In its original American broadcast, "Happily Ever After" was viewed by 9.45 million viewers and received an 18-49 Nielsen Rating of 3.8 and a share of 8% ranking second in its timeslot after American Idol.
