= The Constant =

- Lost episode
- Episode no.: Season 4 Episode 5
- Directed by: Jack Bender
- Written by: Carlton Cuse; Damon Lindelof
- Production code: 405
- Original air date: February 28, 2008
- Running time: 43 minutes

Guest appearances
- Jeff Fahey as Frank Lapidus; Alan Dale as Charles Widmore; Sonya Walger as Penny Widmore; Graham McTavish as Sergeant; Darren Keefe as Billy; Edward Conery as Auctioneer; Fisher Stevens as George Minkowski; Kevin Durand as Martin Keamy; Anthony Azizi as Omar; Marc Vann as Dr. Ray; Chris Gibbon as Soldier

Episode chronology
← Previous "Eggtown"	Next → "The Other Woman"
- Lost season 4

"The Constant" is the fifth episode of the fourth season of the American Broadcasting Company's (ABC) serial drama television series Lost, and the 77th episode overall. It was broadcast on February 28, 2008, on ABC in the United States and on CTV in Canada. It was written by executive producer Carlton Cuse and co-creator/executive producer Damon Lindelof and directed by executive producer Jack Bender. "The Constant" was watched by 15 million American viewers and is regarded by some as Lost's best episode and one of the best episodes of television ever. It was nominated for three Primetime Emmy Awards, a Directors Guild of America Award, and a Hugo Award.

In the episode, Desmond Hume (played by Henry Ian Cusick) and Sayid Jarrah (Naveen Andrews) are being flown by Frank Lapidus (Jeff Fahey) to the freighter where Lapidus' mission is set. After going through turbulence, Desmond's consciousness unexpectedly travels through time between 1996 and 2004. The helicopter reaches the freighter and Sayid and Desmond are introduced to communications officer George Minkowski (Fisher Stevens), who is "unstuck in time" like Desmond. The writers took twice the time expected to develop the episode's script; the biggest concern was the avoidance of a temporal paradox when dealing with time travel.

== Plot ==
Desmond, Sayid and Lapidus experience turbulence while flying the 80 miles (about 130 kilometers) distance from the island where they were stranded to Lapidus' team's freighter, the Kahana. Desmond's consciousness travels back eight years to 1996, when he is serving with the British Army's Royal Scots Regiment. Moments later, when his consciousness returns to the present day, he neither knows where he is nor recognizes his companions, and has no memory of his life since 1996. After the helicopter lands, Desmond continues to jump between 1996 and 2004. He is taken to the sick bay, where a man named Minkowski is strapped to a bed because he is experiencing similar problems. Minkowski explains that someone sabotaged the radio room two days earlier and that Desmond's ex-girlfriend Penny Widmore (Sonya Walger) has been trying to contact the freighter. Sayid uses the satellite phone to contact Jack Shephard (Matthew Fox) on the island and explains that Desmond appears to have amnesia. Daniel Faraday (Jeremy Davies), a physicist from the freighter, asks Jack whether Desmond has recently been exposed to a high level of radiation or electromagnetism. Jack is unsure, and so Daniel speaks to Desmond and asks him about his situation. Desmond responds that he believes that he is in 1996 and is serving with the Royal Scots. Faraday understands and tells Desmond that when he returns to 1996, he needs to go to the physics department of The Queen's College, Oxford University in England to meet with Daniel's past self, and gives Desmond some mechanical settings to relay, along with an extra phrase that Daniel assures him will convince Daniel's past self that the story is legitimate.

Desmond's flashbacks become more frequent and longer. In 1996, Desmond tracks down a younger Faraday at Oxford, who takes Desmond into his laboratory where he is experimenting with a time machine. Setting his electromagnetic device with the settings that Desmond has given him, Daniel places his laboratory rat, Eloise, in a maze and exposes her to electromagnetic energy. The rat appears to become comatose, then awakens and runs the maze. Daniel becomes excited because he had just built the maze and had not yet taught Eloise how to run it. Desmond realizes that, like the rat, he is caught in a time warp that is moving his consciousness between two different bodies at two different points in time and space. Eloise dies of a suspected brain aneurysm brought on by the exposure to the time lapse. Desmond becomes worried that he will die like Eloise, and Daniel instructs him to find something or someone—a constant—who is present in both times and can serve as an anchor for Desmond's mental stability. Desmond decides that Penny can be the constant; however, he must make contact with her in 2004. To find out where she lives, Desmond gets her address from her father Charles (Alan Dale), who is at an auction buying a journal owned by Tovard Hanso written by a crew member of the 19th century ship called the Black Rock. Widmore is willing to give Desmond Penny's address because he knows that Penny no longer wants to be with him.

In 1996, Desmond finds Penny, who is still distraught over their break-up and is not willing to see him. However, he gets her telephone number and tells her not to change it because he will call her on Christmas Eve 2004. In 2004, Sayid, Desmond, and Minkowski escape the sick bay and begin to repair the broken communications equipment. Meanwhile, Minkowski enters into another flashback, and dies. Showing signs of suffering the same fate as Minkowski, Desmond telephones Penny, who tells Desmond that she has been searching for him for the past three years and they reconcile before the power is cut off. Having made contact with his "constant", Desmond stops alternating between 1996 and 2004. Back on the island, Daniel flips through his journal and discovers a note that he had written, "If anything goes wrong, Desmond Hume will be my constant."

== Production ==
"The Constant" is the second Lost episode to deal directly with the concept of time travel after "Flashes Before Your Eyes" from the third season. While promoting that episode, Lindelof said that it uses the flashback device "in a way we never have before and never will again" and while promoting "The Constant", he said that it "upholds that pledge, unpledges it, then repledges it." Lost's writer-producers enjoy science fiction themes such as time travel; however, they were careful not to create a paradox. The rules for time-travel in the series are outlined in "Flashes Before Your Eyes"—although, Lindelof has said that "The Constant" is a more important episode in terms of explaining time travel on the show—by Ms. Hawking (Fionnula Flanagan), who explains that certain events are inevitable and the universe will eventually correct any errors. Had these rules not been established, the writers feared that viewers would lose interest because the stakes of the characters would be lessened. The writers hoped that "The Constant" would further establish that there are no parallel universes or alternate realities. Lindelof reminisced that "just breaking that episode was such a massive headache" and Cuse added that "it was definitely like doing the hardest New York Times crossword puzzle for the week".

Cuse and Lindelof admitted they took some inspiration from the final episode of Star Trek: The Next Generation, "All Good Things...", where Captain Picard jumps between three time frames. The Lost writers compared Minkowski's role to Q, as "someone who is undergoing and understands the same events as our protagonist". Faraday, on the other hand, was the expert that always appears in time travel fiction—as Lindelof put it, "He's our Doc Brown here, who basically is gonna tell the protagonist to go and find him in the past". Whereas the average Lost episode took two weeks to plan and write, "The Constant" took five because the writers experienced difficulty when determining its effect on future stories. Popular Mechanics analyzed the possibility of time travel using Lost's rules. Michio Kaku claimed that "the show's producers did their homework". According to Kaku, "there's no law of physics preventing this kind of time travel—just a lack of know-how … [but] it would take a very advanced civilization to really do this". Cuse stated that "we [the writers] try to use enough science to give a sense of credibility". "The Constant" was the first episode set on the Kahana, but the writers decided to avoid using the new setting just to give new information—Lindelof has declared that "you would have mindless exposition unless the characters were in a constant state of crisis". According to Lindelof, Desmond's confusion prevents the characters who arrived from the island from asking questions to the freighter's crew.

Shooting occurred in the second half of October 2007. The scenes on the freighter in this and later episodes were filmed for several days on a freighter ten to fifteen minutes off the west coast of Oahu, Hawaii, where Lost is filmed. Instead of docking the ship and returning to the ocean each day, the actors and crew slept on the freighter in areas that were not being used for filming. The Oxford scenes were shot at St. Andrew's Cathedral in Honolulu. In 1996, Desmond has short hair and no facial hair and in 2004, Desmond sports long and untamed hair with a full beard. Cusick did not cut his hair; it was hidden underneath a short-haired wig by "really talented hair and makeup folks", according to Carlton Cuse. All freighter scenes were shot before Cusick shaved most of his beard for the 1996 scenes. A fake beard was glued onto Cusick for the episodes "Ji Yeon" and "Meet Kevin Johnson" while his beard grew back. The equations on Faraday's chalkboard were written by a physicist who was hired as a consultant by the producers. The way the transitions between the 1996 and 2004 scenes would take place was frequently discussed during production. The producers took the advice of editor Mark Goldman, who suggested sudden cuts with "no fancy effect, and in some cases, no sound cut", similar to the way "All Good Things..." was edited. The original ending would set up the following episode by having Charlotte (Rebecca Mader) drop a bag containing a gas mask at Faraday's feet. But the producers thought it did not work after the emotional scenes between Desmond and Penny, and decided to finish with Faraday reading his diary.

Jeremy Davies, who plays Daniel Faraday, said "I thought it was a remarkably well-written and brilliantly conceived story. I was quite knocked out by it on a lot of levels." He called it "remarkable storytelling."

== Reception ==
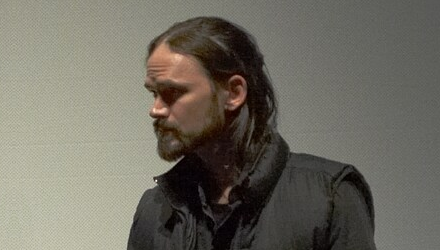
Jeremy Davies's 2004 hairstyle is similar to that of Daniel in 1996

=== Ratings ===
In its original American broadcast, "The Constant" was watched by 12.893 million viewers, ranking Lost eighth in weekly ratings. The episode was watched by a total of 14.998 million viewers, including those who watched within seven days of broadcast, making it the most recorded show of the week; this number went toward the year-end season average. It received 5.4/13 in the key adults 18–49 demographic. The Canadian broadcast was watched by 1.529 million people, making it the sixth most watched show of the week. In the United Kingdom, "The Constant" was watched by 911,000 viewers. 770,000 Australians tuned into Lost, placing it seventy-fifth in the weekly ratings chart.

=== Critical reaction ===
"The Constant" received universal acclaim from both critics and fans and is often cited as the best episode of the entire series. Time named "The Constant" the best television episode of 2008, and according to Oscar Dahl of BuddyTV, "lots of people" referred to it as "the best Lost episode ever". It was listed as the best episode of Lost by IGN, Los Angeles Times, and ABC2, and was also featured in similar lists by TV Guide, and National Post.

In Entertainment Weekly, Alejandro Garay wrote, "One of my favorite episodes of 2008 was Lost’s 'The Constant.' It was a beautiful episode that made us fans fall in love with the show even more. The creators managed to build momentum with smart narrative, by using the romance card to develop such a complicated topic as time traveling. It was exquisite, mind-blowing, impeccably done, and unforgettable." Bill Keveney of USA Today wrote that it is "arguably the most highly praised episode of [the] well-received fourth season", while his colleague Robert Bianco deemed Henry Ian Cusick worthy of an Emmy Award nomination. Patrick Day of the Los Angeles Times called the episode a "mind-blowing tour de force". Maureen Ryan of The Chicago Tribune called it a "for-the-ages episode" with "a classic Lost moment" in Desmond and Penny's phone call and "an especially spine-tingling performance" by Cusick. Verne Gay of Newsday wrote, "last night's forty-four minutes of Lost were among the most satisfying forty-four minutes in front of the tube in my life." He added that "it wasn't merely a brilliant episode, which pushed the mythology forward more rapidly and richly than any episode in my memory, but it was an emotional release … I actually cried when Penny and Desmond finally … connected" and "there wasn't one, single, solitary false note". Alan Sepinwall of The Star-Ledger said that "it was brilliantly executed, as both a brain-twister and as a love story" with an "outstanding" performance by Jeremy Davies. Jeff Jensen of Entertainment Weekly described the episode as "the best single outing since season 1's 'Walkabout'" and named the phone call between Desmond and Penny the best moment of the season excluding any moments from the then yet-to-air season finale. Nikki Stafford of Wizard described "The Constant" as "mindblowing" and cited it as "the reason the hardcore fans love Lost." Matt Roush of TV Guide said that "the time-tripping went into overdrive with this week's brilliant episode … [which] worked beautifully as a showcase for Henry Ian Cusick as the tormented Desmond. It was almost a stand-alone episode, a Twilight Zone/X-Files-style adventure with a start, middle and killer finish."

Kristin Dos Santos of E! "loved every minute" and admitted that "this was one of [her] all-time favorite episodes, what with the undying love business and this indisputable fact: Henry Ian Cusick can frakking act". "The Constant" received high praise from IGN reviewer Chris Carabott calling it "a brilliantly executed hour of television " and "one of the finest episodes in the series". He gave it 10/10, tying it with "Pilot – Part One" and "Through the Looking Glass" as the best reviewed episode of Lost. LTG of Television Without Pity gave the episode an "A+"—the highest grade for any Lost episode. Erin Martell of AOL's TV Squad loved the episode and its unique flashback structure. "The Constant" strengthened her love for Desmond and Penny's story, saying "my heart won't break if none of [Jack, Kate, Sawyer and Juliet] end up together [but] if Desmond and Penny don't reunite, I will be devastated." Oscar Dahl of BuddyTV gave "The Constant" an excellent review, saying that "my mind has never spun this fast after a Lost episode" and the writers have "really outdone themselves" and "do not get enough credit for constantly tinkering with their story structure". Jay Glatfelter of The Huffington Post said that this "episode of Lost not only continued this season's thrilling momentum; it proved to fans that even in its fourth season, it still leaves us with our jaws hanging open … this was the make of possibly one of my favorite Lost episodes ever." Glatfelter also praised the characters, Daniel "more and more becoming one of [his] favorite characters" and calling Desmond "the most intriguing character on Lost [with] the best love story on the show and dare I say on television today". Daniel of TMZ graded the episode as an "A+", considering it to be one of the best Lost episodes. In his review, he compared television to film—specifically "The Constant" to No Country for Old Men, the 2007 Academy Award winner for Best Picture—and decided that television is far superior. Karla Peterson of The San Diego Union-Tribune wrote that "[I was] almost as touched and relieved by the reunion as Desmond and Penny are"; however, she did not review "The Constant" as favorably as other critics, giving it an "A−". Dan Compora of SyFy Portal gave "The Constant" a mixed review. He described it as "an entertaining episode [with] a fine acting performance by Henry Ian Cusick", but criticized Desmond's repetitive story arc, criticized Frank's character, said that "Jeff Fahey is a fine actor, but so far, his character just hasn't really evolved enough for me to care yet" and concluded, "this episode didn't seem to really raise or answer anything of major importance, so I can't help but feel that it was nothing more than mid-season filler." Ben Rawson-Jones of Digital Spy graded it with four out of five stars, and wrote that "a refreshing shift in Lost's tone enabled loyal viewers to have their hearts warmed by the long distance smoochfest between Desmond and his beloved Penny".

In 2018, the popular culture and sports website The Ringer created a list of the 100 best episodes of television in the 21st century. "The Constant" was the number one episode on the list.

In December 2025, The Ringer revised and republished their list of the 100 best episodes of television in the 21st century. "The Constant" held its spot as the number one episode on the list.

=== Awards ===
"The Constant" was nominated for Outstanding Cinematography for a One-Hour Series and Outstanding Music Composition for a Series (Original Dramatic Score) at the 60th Primetime Emmy Awards. Academy of Television Arts & Sciences, (July 17, 2008) It was Lost's representative episode for Outstanding Drama Series and was indeed nominated, losing to Mad Men. Henry Ian Cusick and Jeremy Davies each submitted this episode for consideration on their own behalf for Outstanding Supporting Actor in a Drama Series. This episode was also considered for Outstanding Directing and Outstanding Writing for a Drama Series. The episode was nominated for the 2009 Hugo Award for Best Dramatic Presentation, Short Form. Jack Bender was nominated for the Directors Guild of America Award for Outstanding Directing – Drama Series.
