= Frank Lapidus =

Fictional character of the TV series Lost

Frank J. Lapidus
- Lost character
- Jeff Fahey as Frank Lapidus
- First appearance: "Confirmed Dead"; February 7, 2008
- Last appearance: "The End"; May 23, 2010
- Created by: J. J. Abrams; Damon Lindelof
- Portrayed by: Jeff Fahey

In-universe information
- Gender: Male
- Occupation: Pilot in command
- Nationality: American
- Former residence: The Bronx, New York, US

Frank J. Lapidus is a fictional character on the ABC television series Lost played by Jeff Fahey. Frank is introduced in the second episode of season four as a pilot hired on a mission to the island where Oceanic Flight 815 crashed. He aids the survivors of the crash against mercenary Martin Keamy (Kevin Durand) and helps to rescue a group who become known as the Oceanic Six. Three years later, Frank encounters the group again while working as a commercial airline pilot. His plane lands back on the island, and he is forcibly taken in by a group of his passengers headed by Ilana (Zuleikha Robinson) and Bram (Brad William Henke), who are working for the island's highest authority figure Jacob (Mark Pellegrino). In the series finale, he ultimately escapes the island with a few of his fellow inhabitants.

Frank's name was created by co-executive producer Edward Kitsis, who had been pitching the name "Lapidus" for years and had also used it for an unseen character in the episode "Exposé". Fahey was the producers' first choice for the role, which was developed to suit his personality. As a result of the 2007–2008 Writers Guild of America strike, Frank's role in the first half of season four was diminished, and some planned storylines were carried over into the fifth season. Frank's introduction, along with the three other new characters from the freighter introduced in season four, was well received, as was his return in season five. Lost executive producer Damon Lindelof confirmed in an interview that Lapidus would be a series regular for the show's sixth and final season.

== Arc ==
Originally from The Bronx, New York, Frank was the intended pilot of Oceanic Airlines Flight 815, which crashed on an island in the South Pacific. He is first encountered in The Bahamas, ringing the NTSB to state that the body of the pilot of Flight 815 shown on the sea bed, on the Television news, is not who it is claimed to be. Frank is later recruited as a pilot on behalf of Charles Widmore (Alan Dale), who is chartering a freighter destined for the island upon which Flight 815 crashed. Frank reveals himself to be a conspiracy theorist who believes there are still survivors of Flight 815. He goes on to pilot a helicopter from the freighter to the island, which malfunctions on approach. His team—consisting of Daniel Faraday (Jeremy Davies), Charlotte Lewis (Rebecca Mader) and Miles Straume (Ken Leung)—parachute to safety, and Frank is able to land the helicopter without incurring significant damage. Lapidus identifies Juliet Burke (Elizabeth Mitchell) as a "local" and in response to the return of Charlotte, who was being held hostage by John Locke (Terry O'Quinn), flies Desmond Hume (Henry Ian Cusick) and Sayid Jarrah (Naveen Andrews) to the freighter.

Later, Frank disagrees with the actions of fellow freighter passenger Martin Keamy (Kevin Durand), a mercenary hired to capture island inhabitant Benjamin Linus (Michael Emerson). He helps a group of survivors avoid Keamy's team, and later attempts to resist Keamy's command. When Keamy murders the freighter's captain (Grant Bowler) in a display of power, he is forced to comply, but is able to secretly transfer a satellite phone to the survivors as a warning. When a group of survivors overpower Keamy's mercenaries, Frank attempts to fly them to safety. Due to a lack of fuel, the group—consisting of Lapidus, Sayid, Desmond, Jack Shephard (Matthew Fox), Hugo Reyes (Jorge Garcia), Kate Austen (Evangeline Lilly), Sun-Hwa Kwon (Yunjin Kim) and Aaron Littleton—crash into the ocean, where they take to a lifeboat and are later rescued by the Searcher, a ship belonging to Desmond's girlfriend Penelope Widmore (Sonya Walger).

Following their rescue, Frank begins working for Ajira Airways. He encounters the survivors again three years later, while piloting Flight 316 to Guam. Frank realizes the Oceanic Six intend to return to the island, and minutes later, the flight experiences extreme turbulence. Frank and his co-pilot are able to land the plane on the adjacent Hydra Island, although the co-pilot is killed. After gathering the survivors of Flight 316 together, Frank accompanies Sun and Ben to the main island. They meet Christian Shephard (John Terry), who reveals that the remaining survivors have travelled through time to 1977. Christian instructs them to await the arrival of John Locke, which they do. Sun is determined to remain with Locke and find her husband Jin-Soo Kwon (Daniel Dae Kim), so Frank parts from her, returning to Hydra Island intent on repairing the jet radio to call for help. Upon his return, Frank finds that passenger Ilana (Zuleikha Robinson) has found guns on the island and claimed leadership of the group. After he is unable to answer her cryptic question "What lies in the shadow of the statue?" she attacks him and knocks him out. Frank later regains consciousness in an outrigger, being transported back to the main island by Ilana, Bram (Brad William Henke) and three other Flight 316 survivors. He overhears them discussing whether or not he may be a potential "candidate", though when he asks what he may be a candidate for, they refuse to elaborate. Frank accompanies the group through the jungle to meet up with the island's native inhabitants The Others, at the foot of the aforementioned statue.

In the season six premiere "LA X", Frank tells Sun that he does not trust Ilana and her men. He then witnesses The Man in Black (also O'Quinn), who was posing as Locke all along, knock out Richard Alpert, the Others' ageless advisor. He then participates in the burial of the real Locke. Frank then accompanies Ben, Sun and Ilana to rescue any inhabitant of the attacked Temple. They only rescue Miles. They eventually decide to head for the beach. Frank overhears Miles saying that Ben killed Jacob (Mark Pellegrino). He then tells Ben that he was the original pilot of Oceanic Airlines Flight 815. He is at the beach when Jack, Hurley and Richard arrive.

In order to stop the Man in Black from leaving the island, Richard suggests that they destroy the Ajira plane. After Ilana is killed while holding dynamites, Frank goes to the Black Rock with the group in order to get more dynamite. However, Hurley blows up the ship in order to prevent anymore risks; destroying all the dynamite supplies. After Hurley tells of his plan to talk to the Man in Black and Richard goes with his plan to destroy the plane, Frank joins Hurley, along with Jack, and Sun. Their group then merge with the Man in Black's camp.

Later, Charles Widmore's second in command, Zoe, arrives at the camp and threatens to destroy the camp with artillery shells if the Man in Black does not give back Desmond. Frank, Jack, Hurley, Sun, and Claire Littleton (Emilie de Ravin) go with Sawyer's plan of betraying the Man in Black by joining Widmore, and they escape from the Man in Black's group. After Jack leaves the group, due to his reluctance to leave the island, the remaining group reach Hydra Island. However, Widmore betrays them, and has them locked in the animal cages at Hydra Station. The Man in Black attacks Widmore's camp as the Smoke Monster; allowing Jack, who has joined the Man in Black, to free Frank and the rest of the group. They then head to the Ajira plane to leave the island. But when they get to the plane, the Man in Black reveals the plane is rigged with C4. He then suggests they leave the island by Widmore's submarine.

Frank and the group reach the sub, and they take control of it. After betraying the Man in Black, Widmore's men attack, but they manage to submerge. Jack then discovers the Man in Black planted the C4 in Jack's bag. Sayid sacrifices himself and runs off with the C4 as far away from the others as he could until it explodes. The explosion causes the submarine to sink, and Frank is knocked out after a door hits him. Frank revives and makes it to the surface of the water. He is found by Richard and Miles as they head for Hydra Island to blow up the Ajira plane. Frank convinces them to steal the plane and let him fly it. After much repair work and picking up Kate, Claire, and Sawyer, the plane takes off and heads for home.

== Development ==
"Fahey is one of those actors who feels like he fits into the Lost model: He's enormously talented and will be vaguely recognizable to some people, but he'll be able to land on our island without most people going, 'Oh, I know who that guy is.' And especially for the part we cast him for, he has exactly the right sensibilities."

— Executive Producer Damon Lindelof on Fahey's casting.

After Naomi Dorrit (Marsha Thomason) landed on the island in season three, the producers began to plan who else would be on the boat she came from. They wanted these new characters to be interested in finding the island for their own personal reasons. The team created consisted of Frank, Daniel Faraday, Charlotte Lewis and Miles Straume, referred to as the "freighter folk". Their relationship with the survivors of Flight 815 formed the crux of the fourth season. Co-executive producer/writer Edward Kitsis had been pitching the name "Lapidus" for years, finally naming an unseen character in the fourteenth episode of the third season Rick Lapidus. Unsatisfied, Kitsis developed the character "Frank Lapidus, Helicopter Pilot". According to producers Damon Lindelof and Carlton Cuse, Jeff Fahey "was the first and only choice for the role". Cuse had enjoyed Fahey's roles in The Lawnmower Man and The Marshal, and he and Lindelof commended his "intense eyes", stating that "he has exactly the right sensibilities" for the part. Fahey was offered the part without having to audition. At the time the producers began to consider him for the role, he had taken a break from acting and was living in Afghanistan, doing charity work and running an orphanage in Kabul. When Cuse contacted him about appearing in the show, Fahey was on the top of a mountain in Caracas, Venezuela during a rainstorm, having just opened an orphanage. He had never seen the series before, but the producers talked him through the first three seasons in an attempt to convince him to return to acting and accept the role. When he was cast, Fahey was unaware of whether he would be a guest star, or would develop into a regular. Focus on the character was diminished by the 2007–2008 Writers Guild of America strike, which resulted in the fourth season being cut short. The latter half of the season did feature the character more predominately, however some stories planned for Frank and his fellow freighter folk had to be deferred to the fifth season.

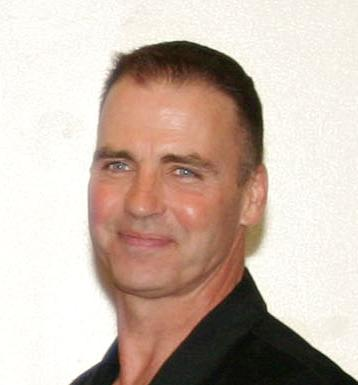
Fahey was the producers' first choice for the role, which was developed to suit his personality.

Frank was not originally envisioned with a beard, however at the time of his casting, Fahey himself had one. Lindelof and Cuse felt that the beard worked with Lapidus' character, and allowed Fahey to keep it for the role, with the requirement he shave it back to a more manageable length. The character remained bearded until his return in fifth season episode "316", set three years on from his original introduction. Fahey praised the way the character was developed to suit him, explaining that upon meeting with Lindelof and Cuse, rather than discussing the show with him, they were more interested in him personally and his experiences, going on to incorporate elements of himself into Lapidus. He expanded: "The beauty of this is they'll feed you a concept based on an idea of who you are. The actor and the characters are not suits off the rack, they tailor-make them to you. What's very exciting is it is a very positive give and take. It's a nice dance, as it were." Fahey was not given an overarching overview of his character, nor were any of the other new freighter folk, which he found exciting, creating a level of intrigue amongst the cast and crew as well as fans. Prior to arrival on the island, Lapidus was described by Naomi as a drunk. Entertainment Weekly's Kristin Dos Santos deemed Lapidus the most laid back of the four new characters, though Fahey commented that "It might be because he's just rolled around a few more places a little longer than the others", agreeing with Dos Santos' assessment that Lapidus was "a little nomadic". Lindelof and Cuse have said that Frank "never takes anything at face value [and is] a true conspiracy nut [who] has probably seen every episode of The X-Files, [which will] pay off for him".

== Reception ==
Producers Lindelof and Cuse were initially worried about how the freighter folk characters would be received by fans, after the unhappy reaction to new characters Nikki (Kiele Sanchez) and Paulo (Rodrigo Santoro), introduced in season three. However, following their introduction in "Confirmed Dead", the four characters were well received, with Paige Albiniak of the New York Post citing them as a reason behind the show's improved ratings. Erin Martell of AOL's TV Squad wrote that within one episode Fahey had already won her over, and called Frank her favorite new Lost character. IGN's Chris Carabott described Frank, as well as the other new characters from the freighter, as "great" and "exciting", writing that: "Fahey's Lapidus has exceptional screen presence that even overshadows the regular cast members to an extent." TV Guide's Bruce Fretts praised the casting of the freighter folk, noting that Fahey had been a personal favourite of his since his appearance in The Marshall. He deemed the group all stronger actors than former Lost stars Michelle Rodriguez, Rodrigo Santoro, Maggie Grace and Ian Somerhalder, and expressed hope that they would remain on the show longer. Jeff Jensen from Entertainment Weekly called the new characters "fascinating" and wrote that they "totally worked for me, while their intriguing backstories left me jonesing for more." Peter Mucha of The Philadelphia Inquirer deemed Frank's flashback "mind-bending", and Oscar Dahl of BuddyTV called "Confirmed Dead" the "perfect introduction" to the new characters, writing that he could not wait to find out more about them. Michael Ausiello of TV Guide also enjoyed their introduction, and praised the actors' performances. Casey Gillis for The News & Advance highlighted the introduction of the freighter folk as one of the highlights of the season, opining that they "fit seamlessly into the ensemble", while Digital Spy's Ben Rawson-Jones praised the season for introducing Frank, who he deemed "a real cult figure." In contrast, James Poniewozik of Time was critical of Lapidus. He wrote that he was amazed by the economy and precision with which the new characters were introduced because "Each got just one flashback and a little time on the island, and yet by the end of the episode, I felt I had a true handle on what they were like as individuals." He appended, however, that this was: "with the possible exception of Frank, who seems a bit too generic-drunk-hippie-guy for now."

Following the episode "Something Nice Back Home", TV Guide's Trish Wethman noted that she was intrigued by Lapidus' "seemingly heroic antics" in saving a group of the survivors from Keamy and his men, though overall was confused by the motivations of the freighter folk. Carabott wrote that Frank's return in the fifth season episode "316" was shocking, but seemed as though it was meant to be. He opined that: "The chances of Frank being on that plane are astronomical and the fact that he was supposed to be the pilot of Flight 815 just makes the situation all the more unusual. His appearance in this episode is absurd but after four and a half seasons of Lost it makes perfect sense." James Yates of the Staten Island Advance wrote that it was "great" to see Frank again, as he had missed the character's presence, and hoped he would play a major part upon returning to the island.
