= Live Together, Die Alone =

- Lost episodes
- Episode nos.: Season 2 Episodes 23 and 24
- Directed by: Jack Bender
- Written by: Carlton Cuse; Damon Lindelof
- Production codes: 223 & 224
- Original air date: May 24, 2006
- Running time: 84 minutes

Guest appearances
- Henry Ian Cusick as Desmond Hume; Clancy Brown as Kelvin Inman; M. C. Gainey as Tom; Sam Anderson as Bernard Nadler; Tania Raymonde as Alex; Michael Bowen as Danny Pickett; April Grace as Bea Klugh; Alan Dale as Charles Widmore; Sonya Walger as Penny Widmore; Michael Emerson as Henry Gale; Stephen Page as Master Sergeant; Len Cordova as Mathias; Alex Petrovitch as Henrik; Teddy Wells as Ivan; Dustin Geiger as Matthew; Dustin Gomes as Barista

Episode chronology
← Previous "Three Minutes"	Next → "A Tale of Two Cities"
- Lost season 2

"Live Together, Die Alone" is the second season finale of the ABC television series Lost, consisting of the 23rd and 24th episodes of the second season. It is also the 48th and 49th episodes overall. The episode was written by Damon Lindelof and Carlton Cuse, and directed by Jack Bender. It first aired in the United States on May 24, 2006, on the American Broadcasting Company. The episode was watched by 17.84 million people and received positive reviews.

In the episode, flashbacks reveal how Desmond came to the island. In the present, Desmond unintentionally returns to the beach and is enlisted by Locke to help him stop the button in the hatch from being pushed. Meanwhile, several castaways head off to rescue Michael's son Walt from the Others.

== Plot ==
=== Flashbacks ===
Desmond Hume (Henry Ian Cusick) is being released from a military prison in 2001 with a dishonourable discharge, for unknown reasons. Upon leaving, he runs into Charles Widmore (Alan Dale) who reveals that he prevented communication between his daughter Penelope (Sonya Walger) and Desmond while he was in prison, and strongly warns Desmond against attempting to reform a relationship. Desmond, wanting to prove that he is not a coward, travels to the United States from the United Kingdom to train for a sailing race around the world, sponsored by Widmore. He meets Libby (Cynthia Watros) in a cafe, and Libby gives Desmond a yacht owned by her late husband. While Desmond is training, Penny tracks him down and angrily questions him. (Jack is seen arriving at the stadium in the background.) Desmond tells her that he is determined to win Widmore's race and promises that he will return. However, while sailing, Desmond gets caught in a bad storm, and washes up on the island. He is rescued by a man in a HAZMAT suit, Kelvin Inman (Clancy Brown) (who also is the American intelligence officer that releases Sayid in one of his flashbacks) who takes him to the Swan and shows him the Orientation film. He explains that it was edited by Stuart Radzinsky, his former partner who faked a lockdown event and created an invisible map on the blast doors with him and then took his own life. Inman also explains that the incident was a "leak" of electromagnetic energy from the Swan that builds up and has to be discharged by pushing the button unless someone accesses a fail-safe. Desmond lives with Kelvin for three years before he finds out that Inman is secretly planning on escaping the island using Desmond's boat. Desmond violently confronts Inman, accidentally killing him in the process. After almost letting the countdown timer reach zero and causing a "System Failure", Desmond starts drinking and contemplates suicide. Before he shoots himself however, he hears John Locke (Terry O'Quinn) banging on the hatch door, and turns on a light. Desmond then realizes that there is still hope and decides not to kill himself.

=== On the island ===
While at the funeral for Ana Lucia Cortez (Michelle Rodriguez) and Libby, a boat comes into view out at sea. Jack, Sayid, and Sawyer swim out to it and climb onto the boat. Shots are fired from inside the boat through the boat hatch entrance. After breaking the hatch open, they find a drunken Desmond piloting the boat. The next day, after Mr. Eko (Adewale Akinnuoye-Agbaje) prevents Locke from destroying the computer that controls the timer, Locke enlists Desmond's help in letting the timer run down to zero. Desmond hotwires the blast doors shut, locking Eko outside the computer room and Desmond and Locke inside it. Eko seeks Charlie Pace's (Dominic Monaghan) help. The two attempt to use dynamite to blow the blast door open, but the blast doors are unscathed, while they are both injured.

Meanwhile, Desmond and Locke discuss the purpose of the stations and discover that when Desmond accidentally caused the "System Failure", the magnetic force pulled Oceanic Flight 815 toward the island, causing the crash. Locke continues to doubt that the timer has any meaning, but Desmond assures him that it is all real. As the timer passes zero, causing another "System Failure", Desmond retrieves the failsafe key he obtained from Inman and crawls underneath the hatch. After he turns the key in the system termination switch, a shrill humming noise and violet-white light envelops the entire island, causing the Oceanic 815 survivors and the Others alike on opposite sides of the island to bend in apparent pain. That night, Charlie is the only person to return from the hatch; the whereabouts of Desmond, Eko, and Locke are not revealed. Charlie reconnects with Claire Littleton (Emilie de Ravin), and they kiss as they sit among their fellow plane survivors.

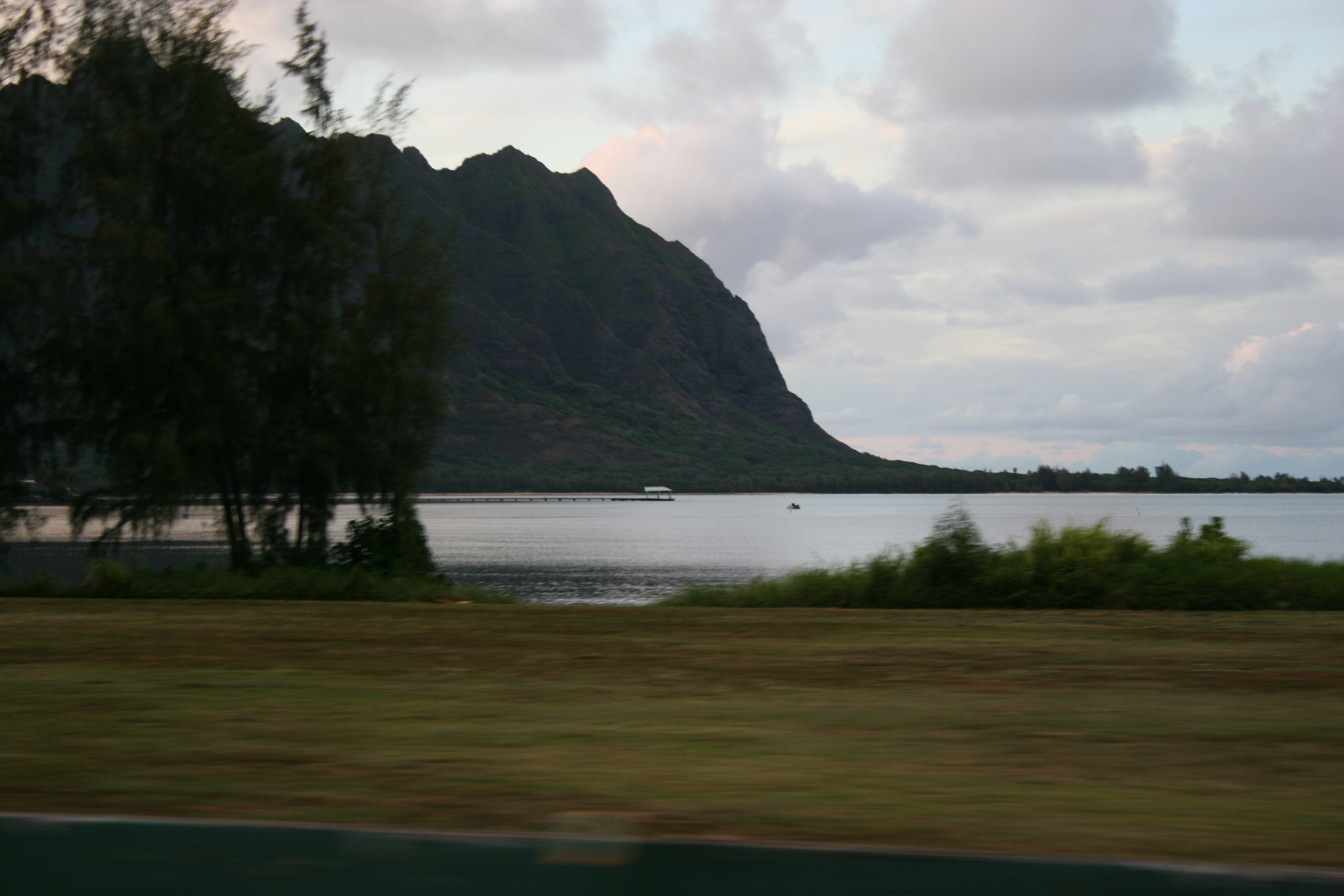
A local dock in Hawaii, as seen in "Live Together, Die Alone".

The survivors split up into two groups to head to the Others' camp. Michael Dawson (Harold Perrineau), Jack Shephard (Matthew Fox), Kate Austen (Evangeline Lilly), James "Sawyer" Ford (Josh Holloway), and Hugo "Hurley" Reyes (Jorge Garcia) walk on land to the camp, bringing guns and ammunition with them. Meanwhile, Sayid Jarrah (Naveen Andrews), Sun-Hwa Kwon (Yunjin Kim), and Jin-Soo Kwon (Daniel Dae Kim) plan to use Desmond's sailboat to go by sea. Sayid plans to use black smoke as a signal, saying that "this time, they will know that we are coming", a reference to the attacks in the first-season finale. When the boat reaches the Others' camp, Sayid finds it to be deserted. Meanwhile, Michael, Jack, Sawyer, Hurley and Kate engage in a gun battle with some Others that were following them, and Sawyer kills one. Jack confronts Michael about leading the group into a trap, and Michael confesses to the murders of Ana Lucia and Libby. They realize that Michael has led them to a location other than the beach, ruining their former plan to meet up with Sayid. There, they see a large pile of pneumatic tubes, suggesting that the reports sent out from the monitoring hatch discovered in the episode "?" had never been read. Shortly after the discovery of the tube pile, they hear whispers, and suddenly Sawyer, Kate, and Jack are incapacitated by electric darts. The hostages, bound and gagged, are brought to a dock, where it appears that the Others are led by Henry Gale (Michael Emerson). Gale keeps his bargain with Michael, returning his son, Walt Lloyd (Malcolm David Kelley), to him and giving them an old fishing boat with instructions to sail on a heading of 325 degrees until they are rescued. Michael threatens Henry that he could tell the outside world of the island's location. Henry responds by telling him that it wouldn't matter as they would not be able to find the island, should they return. He also gives Michael a counter-threat: if he did tell people of the island's location, people would know what he did to get his son back. Michael reluctantly accepts but asks who Henry and his people are, to which Henry responds "We're the good guys, Michael". Michael uses the boat to get him and Walt off the island. Hurley is then released and sent back to the other survivors with a message that they are to stay away from the Others' part of the island. As Hurley is let go, the other three captives are taken away.

=== Epilogue ===
The scene shifts to a cramped research station somewhere far from the island, in a polar climate; two Portuguese-speaking men who are playing chess are interrupted by an alert on a monitor displaying the message ">/ 7418880 Electromagnetic Anomaly Detected" (the number 7,418,880 being the product of the numbers, 4, 8, 15, 16, 23 and 42). One of the men makes a frantic phone call that wakes up Penelope in the middle of the night, telling her, "I think we've found it."

== Production ==
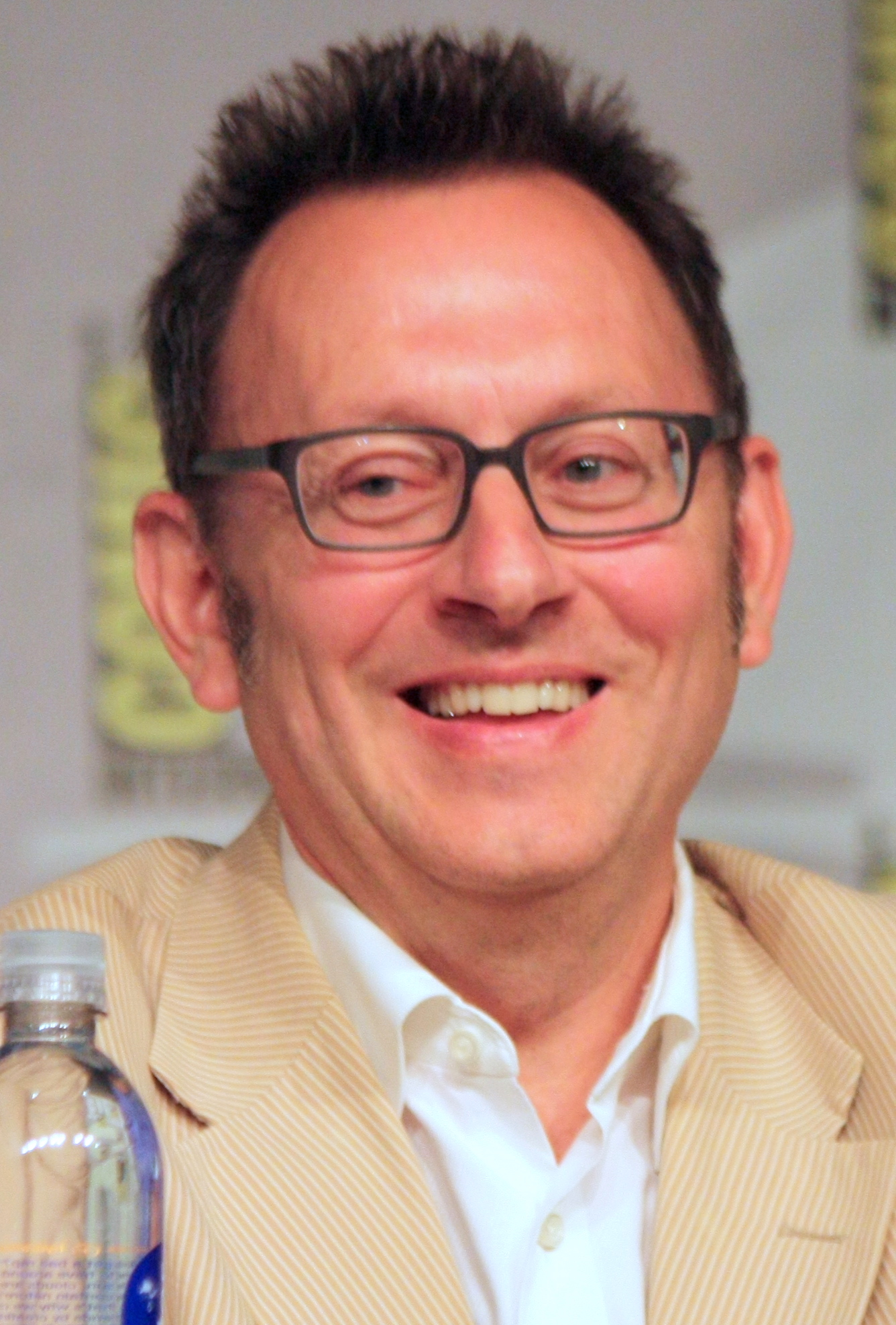
Michael Emerson was originally cast for three episodes, but his contract was later extended for five more episodes.

"Live Together, Die Alone" was the thirteenth episode of the series directed by Jack Bender. The episode was written by Damon Lindelof and Carlton Cuse, the ninth episode that the two had written together.

Due to being two hours long, more time went into shooting "Live Together, Die Alone" than most episodes. It was shot in 17 days by two separate crews. Several scenes had to be shortened or cut due to time constraints. One scene that was cut was: after it is revealed that Michael was a traitor, Sawyer wanted to go back to the camp, because he thought it would be stupid to keep following someone who lied to him. In the past, Lost has had an issue with spoilers being leaked from the set, so for the production of "Live Together, Die Alone", the crew took extra steps to ensure secrecy of pivotal scenes. Alex Petrovitch, who played Henrik, recalled that when auditioning for his part "names, places, and circumstances (of his scene) were shifted so that you couldn’t link the scene to the show." Even other cast members were not told about Petrovitch's scene. Another measure used by the cast and crew to limit the release of spoilers was calling the final scene by the code name "Challah" instead of referencing anything in the scene. However, the attempts to cover up the flashback scenes were less successful and a call sheet was leaked by Lost fan Ryan Ozawa onto the internet, detailing the full plotlines of Desmond's flashbacks, about a month before the episode aired. It is in this episode that it is revealed that Henry Gale is in fact the leader of the Others.

== Reception ==
"Live Together, Die Alone" received a 7.6 in the ages 18–49 demographic in the Nielsen ratings. The episode was watched by 17.84 million viewers.

"Live Together, Die Alone" has been generally well received. IGN's Eric Goldman praised actor Henry Ian Cusick (Desmond Hume) for giving "a likable, sympathetic performance". Goldman went on to say that the episode "was a much better finale than last season", and that it contained one of the "more interesting flashbacks of the entire season". Entertainment Weekly writer Scott Brown described his viewing experience as "I was up, I was down, I was frustrated, I was thrilled, and finally I was...well, a bit numb." Brown criticized the way Charlie reacted to the hatch explosion, stating that he felt the writers were trying to "get us to hate Charlie".

Deathcore band, Veil of Maya have a song named "Namaste", in which the song's chorus has the lyric "Live together, die alone" referencing the episode. The song's breakdowns are also actually written in-key the series' mythic numbers (4 8 15 16 23 42).
