= Daniel Faraday =

Fictional character of the TV series Lost

- Lost character
- Jeremy Davies as Daniel Faraday
- First appearance: "The Beginning of the End"
- Last appearance: "The End"
- Created by: J. J. Abrams; Damon Lindelof
- Portrayed by: Jeremy Davies; Spencer Allyn (Young)
- Centric episode(s): "Confirmed Dead" "The Variable"

In-universe information
- Full name: Daniel Faraday
- Species: Human
- Gender: Male
- Occupation: Physicist; Musician (flash-sideways)
- Relatives: Charles Widmore (father); Eloise Hawking (mother); Penny Widmore (half-sister); Charlie Hume (nephew)
- Nationality: American
- Former residence: Essex, Massachusetts, USA; Oxford, England

Daniel Faraday is a fictional character on the ABC television series Lost played by Jeremy Davies. Faraday is introduced in the Season 4 premiere as a physicist from the Queen's College, University of Oxford. He has short-term memory loss, possibly due to his experiments with radioactivity. He is part of the team aboard the freighter Kahana that is offshore the island. Throughout his time on the series, Faraday plays an important role by sharing his knowledge of time travel. After time traveling to 1977, Faraday is shot and killed by Eloise Hawking (Alice Evans) who is unaware that he is her son.

Jeremy Davies was cast in the role because of the "tremendous intelligence that seems to emanate from him" and was one of the writer-producers' favorite character actors. Davies was critically praised for his performance and critics were generally disappointed by the character's death in season five. UGO.com named him one of the best TV nerds.

== Arc ==
=== Background ===
Daniel was born to Eloise Hawking (Fionnula Flanagan) and Charles Widmore (Alan Dale), both of whom were Others. Eloise raised Daniel on her own, hiding the identity of his father from him and pushing him to develop a scientific mind, much to the detriment of his social life and casual pursuits. After graduating from the University of Oxford with his girlfriend Theresa Spencer, Daniel was offered a £1.5 million grant by industrialist Charles Widmore. In the 1990s, Daniel started working as a physicist at The Queen's College, Oxford, with controversial experiments including sending a subject's consciousness through time. His initial tests on lab rats resulted in their deaths, which led to the abandonment of his studies. During his tenure, Daniel encountered Desmond Hume (Henry Ian Cusick), who was suffering from temporal displacement trapping him between 1996 and 2004. Daniel helped to ground Desmond's consciousness by telling him to find a constant in both time frames, which Desmond decided was to be Penny (Sonya Walger). This encounter had a profound effect on Daniel, reaffirming the legitimacy of his time-displacement theories and prompted him to resume his abandoned experiments. Daniel eventually performed similar experiments on Theresa, but she ended up suffering from temporal displacement as Desmond had and eventually fell into a coma, with temporary periods of lucidity.

The funds for her continuing care were provided by Charles Widmore. As a result of Theresa's fate, Oxford fired Daniel and quietly removed all references to him ever having been at the university. At some point, Daniel also performed an experiment upon himself, resulting in long-term memory damage. While in Essex, Massachusetts, Daniel saw a news report covering the discovery of the apparent wreckage of Oceanic Flight 815 in the depths of the Sunda Trench. Widmore approached Daniel and after informing him that the Sunda Trench wreckage was a hoax, urged him to go to the island, which he said would heal him of his plight. At first, Daniel was reluctant, but Eloise convinced him to go. Daniel is then recruited into a covert team alongside Charlotte Lewis (Rebecca Mader), Miles Straume (Ken Leung) and Frank Lapidus (Jeff Fahey), which is organized by Matthew Abaddon (Lance Reddick) and led by Naomi Dorrit (Marsha Thomason). Their mission was to travel to the island, find Ben Linus (Michael Emerson), the then current leader of the Others, and disable the Dharma Initiative station called the Tempest, which contained poisonous gases.

=== Season 4 ===
Faraday first arrives on the island by parachuting out of a helicopter on December 23, 2004. After setting foot on the island, Faraday's memory problem slowly diminishes. He then encounters the survivors of Oceanic Flight 815, who are believed to be dead by the world at large. On the island, Faraday starts conducting an experiment regarding the island's unique passage of time. After reuniting with Charlotte, Faraday sneaks off with her to the Tempest Dharma Initiative station, where they neutralize a potential source of poison gas. Later, the corpse of the freighter's doctor washes ashore. Jack Shephard (Matthew Fox) confronts Faraday and he is forced to confess that the freighter upon which they arrived was not sent to the island to rescue the survivors. Around this time, Daniel realizes the Secondary Protocol, detailing the whereabouts of Ben Linus, has been activated by Widmore, necessitating their immediate departure from the island. Faraday begins to ferry survivors to the freighter, but Charlotte and Miles choose to remain on the island. Daniel and five survivors are caught midway between the Kahana and the island when the Kahana blows up and the island is "moved" by Ben Linus.

=== Season 5 ===
When Ben causes the island to vanish, Charlotte, Faraday and the remaining survivors begin to travel through time. After the survivors are sent to the past, Faraday lures Desmond out of the Swan Dharma Initiative station, telling him to find Daniel's mother once Desmond is off the island. Upon jumping further to the past, Faraday and the group are captured by the Others in 1954. The Others mistake them for military personnel and Faraday is forced to disable a hydrogen bomb labelled "Jughead". During this time period, he confesses his love for Charlotte. After telling the Others that they must bury the bomb, the survivors experience another time jump. The time jumps cause Charlotte to experience nosebleeds, headaches, and double vision, and she eventually collapses. As she dies, Charlotte tells Faraday she remembers living on the island as a child, and recognizes him as the man who told her not to return once she left the island. After John Locke (Terry O'Quinn) stops the time jumps, the remaining survivors are stranded in 1974. Faraday and his group move into the Barracks and under false pretenses, join the DHARMA Initiative. Despite the option to board the DHARMA submarine and "go back to the real world", the survivors from 2004 stay on the island together in the hope that they can somehow return to the time that they knew and Faraday becomes a scientist for DHARMA. Faraday then leaves the island and joins the DHARMA headquarters in Ann Arbor, Michigan.

In 1977, Daniel arrives back on the island and sets out to stop the construction of the Swan Station before drilling hits the electromagnetic "energy pocket", which ultimately results in the crash of Flight 815. Faraday plans to detonate the hydrogen bomb "Jughead" and destroy the unstable electromagnetic energy so no one would have to be pushing a button to save the world and Flight 815 would not crash. Before putting his plan into action, Daniel visits a young Charlotte, telling her never to return to the island once she leaves. Daniel then travels to the Others' camp with Jack and Kate Austen (Evangeline Lilly) to obtain the bomb. He breaks into their camp and threatens to shoot Richard Alpert (Nestor Carbonell). However, he is shot by his mother, Eloise Hawking. Before Daniel dies, he tells Eloise he is her son and she sent him to the island despite knowing he would die.

=== Afterlife ===
In the afterlife, in which Oceanic Flight 815 does not crash on the Island, Faraday has a different background. Daniel was allowed to pursue his passion for music, and never trained in physics. After overhearing Eloise trying to persuade Desmond to stop pursuing Penelope (Sonya Walger), Faraday approaches Desmond and shares his theory of the timeline being altered. He tells Desmond that he recently saw a red-haired woman he strongly felt he already knew and loved. Daniel states after the encounter, he made a series of notes in his journal which a mathematician has identified as advanced quantum mechanics, a topic he knows nothing about. Daniel shows his notes, and hypothesises that the world as he and Desmond are experiencing is not their correct path. Faraday then tells him Penelope is his half-sister and where Desmond can find her. Later, Faraday meets Charlotte at his benefit concert, but they do not yet realize they are in the afterlife. Daniel then takes the stage with DriveShaft to play as Charlotte watches from the crowd. It is later implied that both Eloise and Desmond are both aware that they are living in the afterlife. Eloise convinces Desmond to let Faraday live out the rest of his afterlife, since Faraday was never allowed to live the life he wanted in his past, and Eloise was never allowed to spend time with her son.

== Development ==
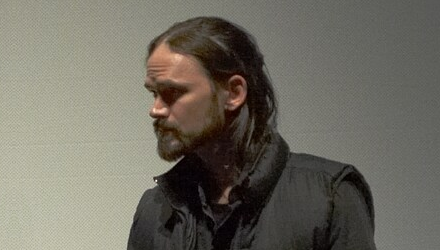
Jeremy Davies's 2004 hairstyle is similar to that of Daniel in 1996

After Naomi Dorrit (Marsha Thomason) landed on the island in season three, the producers began to plan who else would be on the boat she came from. They wanted these new characters to be interested in finding the island for their own personal reasons. During the casting of the "freighter folk"—the nickname that Lost's producers Damon Lindelof and Carlton Cuse use to refer to Daniel, Charlotte, Miles and Frank—fake names, occupations and scenes were temporarily assigned, to limit the leak of spoilers. In the initial casting call, Daniel was referred as "brilliant mathematician" "Russell".

Jeremy Davies was cast as Daniel because he was one of the writer-producers' favorite character actors, and they think that his "transformative quality [and] the tremendous intelligence that seems to emanate from him … seemed perfect for [the part]." The producers constructed the role around Davies based on his performances in Rescue Dawn and Solaris. When Davies met costume designer Roland Sanchez, he was wearing a thin black tie. Sanchez merged this "cool, edgy look" with his idea for the character's clothes: a "nerdy" loosely woven dress shirt from J.Crew. Davies reportedly took a "crash course" on physics to understand the character better. Showrunners Damon Lindelof and Carlton Cuse called Daniel Faraday "an obvious shout-out to Michael Faraday, scientist and physicist". Faraday was originally planned to be a recurring role.

== Reception ==
Producers Lindelof and Cuse were worried about how the new characters would be received by fans, after the unhappy reaction to new characters Nikki (Kiele Sanchez) and Paulo (Rodrigo Santoro), introduced in season three. However, following their introduction in "Confirmed Dead", the four characters were well received, with Paige Albiniak of the New York Post citing them as a reason behind the show's improved ratings. IGN's Chris Carabott described Daniel, as well as the other new characters from the freighter, as "great" and "exciting". James Poniewozik of Time liked the introduction of the new characters from the freighter because "Each got just one flashback and a little time on the island, and yet by the end of the episode, [he] felt [he] had a true handle on what they were like as individuals". Oscar Dahl of BuddyTV called it the "perfect introduction". Michael Ausiello of TV Guide also liked their introduction, and praised the actors' performances. Jeff Jensen from Entertainment Weekly liked that the "fascinating" new characters brought "mind-blowing new possibilities, and exciting new theory fodder".

Many critics praised Davies' performance and appearance. Tom Iacuzio of The Daytona Beach News-Journal deemed Jeremy Davies's performance deserving of a Primetime Emmy Award. Alan Sepinwall of The Star-Ledger claimed Davies's performance to be "outstanding" . Jay Glatfelter of The Huffington Post said that Daniel "more and more becoming one of [his] favorite characters". Chris Carabott wrote that Davies presents Faraday's awkward mannerisms well. In a later review, Carabott commented, "I've become a huge fan of Davies over the course of the last couple of years thanks to his performance on this show." Rachel Dovey of Paste said "The Variable" revealed "a whole different" side of Daniel: "We've oscillated before about the true nature of the physicist, whether it's good or evil [...] We decided he's mostly a decent guy, barring the whole experimenting-on-his-girlfriend-then-running-away-when-her-brain-turned-to-mush thing. In the past, he's just seemed lost and confused, and, since he has those big, earnest puppy eyes, we decided to forgive him. But the episode showed us the dynamic at the heart of Daniel's stuttering vulnerability. Like all broken superheroes and Freudian beings, the man has mommy issues. This week we dove inside the dynamic between Daniel and his mother growing up." Also, Adam Sweeney believed Davies's acting was the "high point" of the episode. A reviewer for TVoholic claimed he would have "loved any sort of explanation as to why [Daniel] changed his mind about changing the past or how he thought this could work. There must have been something that made Daniel think this was possible, but he was in such a rush that he never took care to explain."

Critics expressed shock regarding Daniel's death. David Oliver of CHUD.com felt "bummed" to see Daniel go. Dan Compora of Airlock Alpha also said the shooting of Daniel at the end was “stunning.” Jon Lachonis of TVOvermind claimed that as an internal character piece, "The Variable" was "not so much a great ending for Daniel.

Jeremy Davies submitted the episode "The Constant" on his behalf for a Primetime Emmy Award for Outstanding Supporting Actor in a Drama Series.
