= Charles Widmore =

Fictional character from the TV series Lost

- Lost character
- Alan Dale as Charles Widmore in 2008.
- First appearance: "Live Together, Die Alone" (2006)
- Last appearance: "What They Died For" (2010)
- Created by: J. J. Abrams; Damon Lindelof
- Portrayed by: Alan Dale (senior); David S. Lee (middle age); Tom Connolly (teenage)

In-universe information
- Full name: Charles Widmore
- Species: Human
- Gender: Male
- Occupation: Industrialist; former leader of the Others
- Children: Daniel Faraday (son); Penny Widmore (daughter)
- Relatives: Charlie Hume (grandson)
- Nationality: English
- Residence: London, England, UK

Charles Widmore is a fictional character on the ABC television series Lost, which chronicles the lives of over forty people after their plane crashes on a remote island somewhere in the South Pacific. He is primarily portrayed by Alan Dale; Tom Connolly and David S. Lee portray him as a young and middle-aged man, respectively.

Charles is a member of the island's native population, the Others, and serves as their leader until he is banished from the island. He is the father of Penelope Widmore (Sonya Walger) and Daniel Faraday (Jeremy Davies), although he is estranged from both of them. The character is first introduced in the second-season finale as a wealthy industrialist, who disapproves of the relationship between his daughter and Desmond Hume (Henry Ian Cusick). After being mostly depicted in Desmond's flashbacks, his role expanded throughout the fourth season.

Alan Dale has received praise for his performance, and critics have also responded positively to the mystery surrounding the character.

== Character biography ==
=== Before exile ===
Charles Widmore (born 1937; died 2007) is seen as a 17-year-old Other in 1954, when he is captured with one of his people, by James "Sawyer" Ford (Josh Holloway), Juliet Burke (Elizabeth Mitchell), and John Locke (Terry O'Quinn). He communicates in Latin with his associate, which is foiled when Juliet reveals what they're saying, having been similarly educated in Latin as part of her training as a doctor and an Other. When Juliet convinces his associate to bring them to Richard Alpert (Nestor Carbonell), Charles kills the associate and takes off into the jungle. Locke follows him and is held at gunpoint by Charles until Richard orders him to stand down.

In 1977, Ben Linus, at the time a twelve-year-old boy living with the Dharma Initiative, is brought to the Others to be healed. Richard allows the boy to be healed, despite knowing that Charles will be displeased with his decision, stating that he does not answer to Charles. Charles, who is now the Others' leader, later visits Ben and informs him that he is now an Other, even though he must go back to living with his abusive father at the Dharma Initiative. Sometime after this incident, Charles and Eloise Hawking (Alice Evans) have a child, Daniel Faraday (Jeremy Davies), who is raised off-island.

As he grows older, Charles begins to fall out of favor with the Others. In 1988, he orders the execution of Danielle Rousseau, to be carried out by Ben. Ben is unable to kill Rousseau when he discovers that she has recently given birth. Ben abducts the infant, Alex, without killing Danielle, and returns to the Others. Charles is furious, having expected Ben to kill both Danielle and the child. Ben claims that Charles isn't following Jacob's will, and forces him to back down by insisting he kill Alex personally.

In 1992, following increased conflict between the Others and the Dharma Initiative, the Others purged the island of the Dharma folk by releasing poisonous gas at Dharma's barracks. The Others subsequently move into the barracks. It is during this time that Charles is banished from the island as punishment for repeatedly leaving the island and fathering a child, Penelope "Penny" Widmore (Sonya Walger), with an "outsider." Charles tells Ben, the Others' new leader, that one day he will have to choose between Alex, now his adopted daughter, and the island.

=== After exile ===
Charles is opposed to Desmond Hume (Henry Ian Cusick) having a relationship with his daughter. In 1996, Desmond seeks Charles's permission to ask for Penny's hand in marriage. Charles refuses after humiliating Desmond by stating Desmond is not even worthy enough to drink his expensive whiskey. Years later, upon Desmond's release from military prison, Charles confronts him and reveals that he has intercepted every letter Desmond wrote to Penny while in prison, causing Penny to believe Desmond no longer cares for her. Charles offers Desmond a large amount of cash to never have contact with his daughter again; Desmond refuses the money.

Charles spends most of his time since his banishment searching for a way to return to the island. In 2004, Oceanic Airlines Flight 815 crashed on the island and Charles plants fake wreckage of the plane in the Sunda Trench, so that no one will find out that it really crashed on the island. Charles eventually finds the island after the large discharge of electromagnetism, caused by the destruction of the Swan station, is detected by scientists working for him. Charles hires a team to travel to the island on a freighter, the Kahana. The team consists of scientific personnel — Daniel Faraday, Charlotte Lewis (Rebecca Mader), and Miles Straume (Ken Leung) — and a mercenary team led by Martin Keamy (Kevin Durand). Their primary mission is to capture Ben Linus, with the secondary objective of "torching" the island by killing all of its other inhabitants. Following the mercenaries' failure to capture him, Ben moves the island, forcing him to leave it as well. Charles is subsequently visited by Ben, who claims that he will kill Penny, in retribution for Keamy killing Alex on the island.

In 2007, John Locke, having left the island, is located by Charles, who explains that a war is coming for the island and that Locke must help him ensure that the "wrong side" doesn't win. He enlists the help of his associate Matthew Abaddon (Lance Reddick) to assist Locke in reuniting the "Oceanic Six", six survivors of Flight 815 who also left the island, to bring them back. During this time, Charles also has meetings with Sun-Hwa Kwon (Yunjin Kim), in which they both agree upon the necessity of murdering Ben Linus, and Desmond, who demands Eloise Hawking's address. Charles complies, and asks him to return to hiding and not get involved with the island, for Penny's sake. However, Desmond inadvertently leads Ben to Penny when he visits Eloise (Fionnula Flanagan). Desmond is shot by Ben, who is unable to kill Penny after noticing that she and Desmond have a child. Charles goes to the hospital where Desmond is being treated and speaks with Eloise, though he does not visit his daughter. He mentions sacrificing his son Daniel as well.

After being exiled for 20 years, Widmore finally returns to the Island in a submarine when he gives orders to "proceed as planned" in spite of the group of people on the beach being spotted by said submarine.

His team captures Sawyer and escorts him to his submarine, docked at the second island adjacent to the main one. Charles is seemingly surprised when Sawyer tells him that Locke sent him to this second island – he says Locke is dead, which Sawyer confirms. Sawyer then proposes that he return to the other Island, lie to "Locke" that the coast is clear, bring him back to this island, and walk him into Charles' trap. Charles agrees. Charles then gets his crew to abduct Jin (Daniel Dae Kim) from Locke's camp in order to insure that he had leverage over the Man in Black so he couldn't leave the Island. It is then revealed that Widmore brought Desmond back to the Island in order to do a specific task. He puts him in a crate that expels vast amounts of electromagnetic energy, and Desmond wakes up in the alternate timeline. When Desmond returns, he tells Widmore he knows exactly what he has to do. Widmore is later confronted by the Man in Black, who gives him a choice: either he tell the Man in Black why he returned to the island, or the Man in Black would hunt down and kill Penny upon returning to the mainland. After apparently deciding to help, he is shot and killed by Ben, who explains, "He doesn't get to save his daughter." The Man in Black then tells Ben that Widmore had already told him everything he needed to know.

=== Afterlife ===
Season six of the series shows, concurrent with the main drama, a secondary narrative in what appears to be a parallel timeline. In the series finale, however, this is revealed to be a form of purgatory constructed to reunite the various characters. In the purgatorial universe inhabited by the characters after their deaths, Widmore is married to Eloise and has a hand in raising his son Daniel. As seen in "Happily Ever After", Desmond works directly under Charles and is respected by him, going so much as to give him some of his sixty-year-old McCutcheon scotch. He instructs Desmond to pick up Charlie Pace since his band Drive Shaft is to play with his son in a charity event. Desmond fails to do this, since Charlie forces Desmond's car off a pier and into the water. Widmore then asks Desmond to explain his failure to get Drive Shaft to play to his wife. Eloise notices Desmond's growing awareness of his original life, and pleads with him to cease his efforts to learn more of it. In the series finale, "The End", she pleads again that he not take Daniel away from her, and is relieved when Desmond tells her he has no intention of taking him. While the other main characters "move on", the Widmores continue to exist as a family in this universe.

== Development ==
The name Widmore is introduced in the twelfth episode of season two, "Fire + Water", where a sign with Widmore Construction appears on the back of a building. The name appears again four episodes later in "The Whole Truth"; Sun's pregnancy test is made by Widmore Laboratories. In the season two finale "Live Together, Die Alone", Charles Widmore and his daughter Penelope are introduced. Alan Dale was a regular on ABC's Ugly Betty, when he was asked to appear on the show. Dale made his first appearance on the show in a single scene of the second-season finale "Live Together, Die Alone". Dale's publicist was initially worried that Widmore would become a starring role, meaning it would be hard for Dale to appear in both Lost and Ugly Betty at the same time. In 2008, Dale was asked to return to Oahu, Hawaii, where filming took place, but he was unable due to his commitment to the Monty Python musical Spamalot. He suspected the producers would recast the role or bring in a new character, but much to his surprise, they came to London to include Dale in the filming anyway.

== Reception ==
Ben Rawson-Jones of Digital Spy wrote that, because of Dale's portrayal, "Widmore is far from the one-dimensional bad guy, as a certain degree of humanity has shone through". Eric Goldman from IGN enjoyed Dale's introduction in "Live Together, Die Alone" but found it "odd" to see Dale in Lost, having been watching The O.C. on DVD, which features Dale as Caleb Nichol. The Chicago Tribune's Maureen Ryan thought it was "cool" to see Alan Dale in this role, and speculated of Widmore's connection to the island.

Many reviewers were unsurprised at the revelation that Widmore sent the freighter to the island. Oscar Dahl of BuddyTV had difficulty taking Widmore seriously, as seeing Dale made him think of Dale's role in The O.C., and he did not find the reveal that Widmore sent the freighter to be a shock. Tim Goodman from the San Francisco Chronicle was also not surprised by the reveal and found it uncompelling. James Poniewozik from Time was hopeful of a more interesting dynamic between Ben and Widmore following the reveal, as Widmore's quest for the island seemed disappointing.

Dan Kois and Lane Brown of New York magazine were unsure how they felt about Widmore and Ben's meeting in "The Shape of Things to Come". They initially found it "ridiculous" felt it had too much dialogue, but they liked the "canny and confusing" reversal of the clichéd discussions between heroes and villains because they were unsure of who was the villain and who was the hero.
