= Penny Widmore =

Fictional character of the TV series Lost

Penelope "Penny" Widmore
- Lost character
- Sonya Walger as Penny Widmore
- First appearance: "Live Together, Die Alone"
- Last appearance: "The End"
- Created by: J. J. Abrams; Damon Lindelof
- Portrayed by: Sonya Walger

In-universe information
- Species: Human
- Gender: Female
- Occupation: Beneficiary
- Spouse: Desmond Hume
- Children: Charlie Hume
- Relatives: Charles Widmore (father); Daniel Faraday (half-brother)
- Nationality: English
- Former residence: Knightsbridge, London, England

Penelope "Penny" Widmore is a fictional character on the ABC television series Lost played by Sonya Walger. Penny is introduced in the last episode of the second season of Lost as the long-lost lover of Desmond Hume as well as the daughter of British tycoon and antagonist Charles Widmore. Despite only being a recurring character, she made notable appearances in three season finales of the show: "Live Together, Die Alone", "Through the Looking Glass", and "There's No Place Like Home". Penny and Desmond's relationship is generally liked by critics and fans alike. Commentators, such as those from Entertainment Weekly, have commended the writing of their storyline.

== Arc ==
Penny was born to Charles Widmore (Alan Dale) and an unnamed woman in England. She first met Desmond (Henry Ian Cusick) sometime in 1994 at a monastery in Scotland and asked him to help her deliver wine to Carlisle, to which he gladly agreed. Two years later, they were living together, despite her father's disapproval. Even though both were happy together, their relationship appeared to be unstable due to the disparity between the wealth of the two characters; Penny was an heir while Desmond merely worked at a theatre company. It eventually turned the curve when Desmond was unable to pay for a photograph forcing Penny to pay for it. Feeling ashamed by his inability, Desmond left Penny, regardless of what she thought, and joined the Royal Scots Regiment. Penny was disappointed that Desmond left her without any notice. When he abruptly visits her in 1996 and asks for her number, she was confused because he told her he would call her 8 years later. In spite of her frustration, she allowed him to have her number so that he could call her later. Despite these setbacks and heartaches, Penny continued to have feelings for Desmond. She wrote him a letter after she had learned that he was going to prison and hid it in the only book by Charles Dickens that he had not yet read, Our Mutual Friend. He, however, was unaware and didn't read it while he was there even after was released from prison and from the Army, and instead kept the book where it was. Desmond also wrote letters but her father intercepted them believing that Desmond was unfit for his daughter. He then persuades Desmond to join a round-the-world sailing race to prove his worth to Penny. Months after Desmond had begun his training for the race, they meet in Los Angeles, she assumed that he had read her letter but was startled when he asked her when she was going to be married. She replied by saying "We haven't set a date". They, however, would not end up getting married because Desmond would suddenly disappear later.

Years after Desmond's mysterious disappearance, Penny was still determined to find him. Her hope increased when her listening station was able to find the coordinates of The Island. Days later, she made contact with Charlie Pace (Dominic Monaghan), who asked her if she had sent a boat to the island. She replied that she hadn't. Before she could speak to Desmond, who was there with Charlie, the communication failed. On the Christmas Eve of 2004, she received the call Desmond had promised her and was elated that he was alive. This event marked the first time they had spoken to each other in four years. Penny and Desmond would later be united at last when her boat, Searcher, was able to rescue him, along with the members of the Oceanic 6, Jack Shephard (Matthew Fox), Kate Austen (Evangeline Lilly), Hugo "Hurley" Reyes (Jorge Garcia), Sayid Jarrah (Naveen Andrews), Sun-Hwa Kwon (Yunjin Kim), and Aaron Littleton, along with Frank Lapidus (Jeff Fahey).

Penny and Desmond's first child, Charlie, was born somewhere in the Philippines, aboard the ship Our Mutual Friend, after they went into hiding from her father. In 2007, Penny would face her father's nemesis, Benjamin Linus (Michael Emerson), who threatened to kill her as a result of the murder of Alex by Widmore's men. However, when he saw their son, Ben hesitated allowing Desmond to stop him.

=== Flash-sideways ===
In the alternate timeline Penny's last name is Milton and she never met Desmond. She is jogging in a stadium when Desmond comes to meet her for the first time. When Desmond shakes her hand, he collapses. When he gets back up, he asks Penny if she would like to go have coffee and she agrees to meet him in an hour. She and Desmond smile back at each other. Time notes the surname Milton connects her character to John Milton, the English poet famous for writing Paradise Lost, an epic poem about free will, good and evil. In the finale episode of the series, the alternate timeline is revealed to be a purgatorial meeting place prior to the afterlife, after Penny's death sometime in her future. Penny and Desmond sit together in the church alongside the other main characters and "move on". For this episode, and in spite of scarce screen time, Walger was elevated to main cast status.

== Reception ==
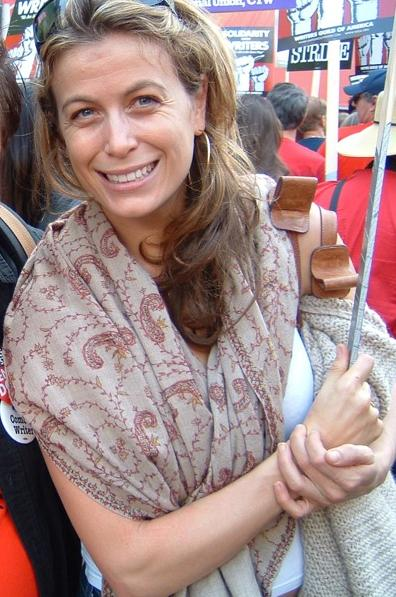
Sonya Walger

Penny and Desmond's relationship has been received positively by critics. In Entertainment Weekly, Alejandro Garay wrote, "One of my favorite episodes of 2008 was Lost’s 'The Constant.' It was a beautiful episode that made us fans fall in love with the show even more. The creators managed to build momentum with smart narrative, by using the romance card to develop such a complicated topic as time traveling. Maureen Ryan of The Chicago Tribune praised Penny and Desmond's phone call in "The Constant", saying "a classic Lost moment" in Desmond and Penny's phone call. Verne Gay of Newsday called it an emotional release, "I actually cried when Penny and Desmond finally... connected" and "there wasn't one, single, solitary false note". Jeff Jensen of Entertainment Weekly named the phone call between Desmond and Penny the best moment of the season excluding any moments from the then yet-to-air season finale.

Erin Martell of AOL's TV Squad said that "The Constant" strengthened her love for Desmond and Penny's story, saying "my heart won't break if none of [Jack, Kate, Sawyer and Juliet] end up together [but] if Desmond and Penny don't reunite, I will be devastated." Jay Glatfelter of The Huffington Post said Penny and Desmond had "the best love story on the show and dare I say on television today". Karla Peterson of The San Diego Union-Tribune wrote that "[I was] almost as touched and relieved by the[ir] reunion as Desmond and Penny are"; however. Ben Rawson-Jones of Digital Spy wrote that "a refreshing shift in Lost's tone enabled loyal viewers to have their hearts warmed by the long distance smoochfest between Desmond and his beloved Penny". IGN''s Chris Carabott praised the on-screen chemistry of Henry Ian Cusick (Desmond) and Sonya Walger (Penelope), stating that "their on screen chemistry makes the love between the two characters real and makes their inevitable breakup that much harder to handle.".

Key: = Recurring
Key: = Guest
Key: = No Appearances

Actor	Character	Appearances						
Actor	Character	S1	S2	S3	S4	S5	S6	Total
Sonya Walger	Penelope "Penny" Widmore		2	3	2	5	2	14
