= Desmond Hume =

Fictional character of the TV series Lost

- Lost character
- Henry Ian Cusick as Desmond Hume
- First appearance: "Man of Science, Man of Faith"
- Last appearance: "The End"
- Created by: J. J. Abrams; Damon Lindelof
- Portrayed by: Henry Ian Cusick
- Centric episode(s): "Live Together, Die Alone" "Flashes Before Your Eyes" "Catch-22" "The Constant" "Jughead" "Happily Ever After"

In-universe information
- Full name: Desmond David Hume
- Species: Human
- Gender: Male
- Occupation: DHARMA Initiative worker Assistant of Charles Widmore (flash-sideways)
- Spouse: Penny Widmore
- Children: Charlie Hume
- Nationality: Scottish
- Former residence: Glasgow, Scotland

Desmond David Hume is a fictional character on the ABC television series Lost portrayed by Henry Ian Cusick. Desmond's name is a tribute to empiricist philosopher David Hume. He was not a passenger on Flight 815, but had been stranded on the island three years prior to the crash as the result of a shipwreck. Desmond eventually leaves the Island with the Oceanic Six and is reunited with his love Penny Widmore (Sonya Walger).

Desmond was one of the show's most popular characters. In 2006, Cusick's portrayal was nominated for an Emmy. In 2007, a two-week-long tournament-style competition for Lost's best character, with over 6,000 voters, hosted by The Washington Post voted Desmond the winner.

== Development ==
Desmond is named after David Hume, a Scottish philosopher who discussed the ideas of free will and determinism. These ideas are reflected in Desmond's time travel where he meets Mrs. Hawking, a woman who explains that the universe has a specific way in which things must take place: anywhere that things go off course, the universe will correct itself. Cusick was originally hired for only three episodes in the beginning of season two, but he returned in the finale and became a regular cast member from the third season.

In the episode "The Constant", Desmond appears in two ways. In 1996, he has short hair and no facial hair, while in 2004, he has long and untamed hair with a full beard. Cusick did not cut his hair; it was hidden by "really talented hair and makeup folks", according to Carlton Cuse. All freighter scenes were shot before Cusick shaved most of his beard for the 1996 scenes. He then used a fake beard for the episodes "Ji Yeon" and "Meet Kevin Johnson" while his beard grew back. Desmond is often distinguished by his cheery attitude and his habit of referring to people as "Brother".

Cusick was not named a regular cast member in the press release for season six, but he was one and was credited as such in the episodes.

== Reception ==
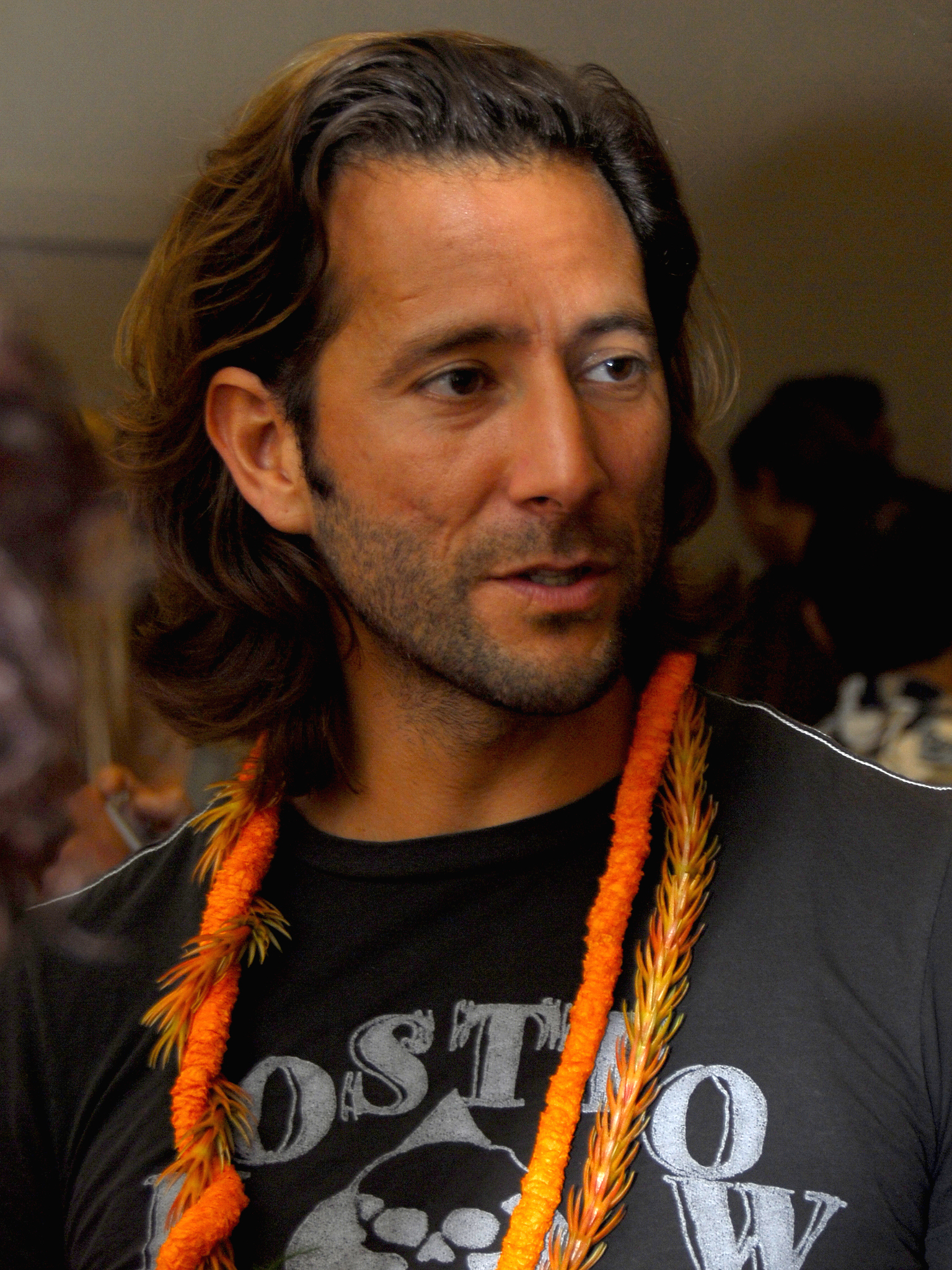
Actor Henry Ian Cusick at the Tenney Theatre in Honolulu for a "Honolulu Theatre for Youth" fundraiser.

In 2006, Cusick was the only Lost actor to be nominated for an Emmy. He lost the Award for Outstanding Guest Actor to Christian Clemenson from Boston Legal.

Eric Goldman from IGN thought Desmond's flashbacks were "some of the more interesting flashbacks of the [second] season", finding Cusick's portrayal of Desmond as "likable" and "sympathetic". IGN's Chris Carabott complimented Cusick's performance in "Flashes Before Your Eyes", particularly liking the chemistry between Cusick and Sonya Walger, as well as between Cusick and Alan Dale. Maureen Ryan of the Chicago Tribune thought Cusick's performance in the fourth-season episode "The Constant" was "especially spine-tingling". Gary Susman from Entertainment Weekly described Desmond's storyline as "the most emotionally satisfying character arc of season 4", feeling he deserved another Emmy nomination. Critic Kelly Woo, from TV Squad, placed him at #1 on her list of "Seven new characters that worked". Penny and Desmond's relationship has been received positively by critics. In Entertainment Weekly, Alejandro Garay wrote, "One of my favorite episodes of 2008 was Lost's 'The Constant.' It was a beautiful episode that made us fans fall in love with the show even more. The creators managed to build momentum with smart narrative, by using the romance card to develop such a complicated topic as time traveling. Maureen Ryan of the Chicago Tribune praised Penny and Desmond's phone call in "The Constant", saying "a classic Lost moment" in Desmond and Penny's phone call. Verne Gay of Newsday called it an emotional release, "I actually cried when Penny and Desmond finally... connected" and "there wasn't one, single, solitary false note". Jeff Jensen of Entertainment Weekly named the phone call between Desmond and Penny the best moment of the season excluding any moments from the then yet-to-air season finale.

Erin Martell of AOL's TV Squad said that "The Constant" strengthened her love for Desmond and Penny's story, saying "my heart won't break if none of [Jack, Kate, Sawyer and Juliet] end up together [but] if Desmond and Penny don't reunite, I will be devastated." Jay Glatfelter of The Huffington Post said Penny and Desmond had "the best love story on the show and dare I say on television today".

Karla Peterson of The San Diego Union-Tribune wrote that "[I was] almost as touched and relieved by the[ir] reunion as Desmond and Penny are". Ben Rawson-Jones of Digital Spy wrote that "a refreshing shift in Lost's tone enabled loyal viewers to have their hearts warmed by the long distance smoochfest between Desmond and his beloved Penny".

IGN's Chris Carabott praised the on-screen chemistry of Henry Ian Cusick (Desmond) and Sonya Walger (Penelope), stating that "their on screen chemistry makes the love between the two characters real and makes their inevitable breakup that much harder to handle".
