= Charlotte Lewis (Lost) =

Fictional character from the TV series Lost

- Lost character
- Rebecca Mader as Charlotte Lewis in "Recon"
- First appearance: "Confirmed Dead"
- Last appearance: "The End"
- Created by: J. J. Abrams; Damon Lindelof
- Portrayed by: Rebecca Mader
- Centric episode(s): "Confirmed Dead"^{[a]}

In-universe information
- Full name: Charlotte Staples Lewis
- Species: Human
- Gender: Female
- Occupation: Cultural anthropologist
- Nationality: English
- Former residence: Essex, England

Charlotte Staples Lewis is a fictional character on the ABC television series Lost, played by Rebecca Mader. Charlotte is introduced in the second episode of season four and is a cultural anthropologist on a mission to the island where Oceanic Flight 815 crashed. On the island, she is held hostage by one of the plane crash survivors, John Locke (Terry O'Quinn), but is freed when another person from her team switches places with her. She helps prevent poison gas from being released over the island, and develops a relationship with Daniel Faraday (Jeremy Davies). Charlotte dies in Daniel's arms after the frequent time traveling causes her headaches to worsen into something unexplainable.

Although conceived by the show's creators to be American, Charlotte's nationality was changed to British after the producers were impressed with English actress Rebecca Mader's audition. She was supposed to feature in just eight episodes of season four, but after the 2007–2008 Writers Guild of America strike the role was expanded, which resulted in her starring in fifteen episodes over the fourth and fifth seasons. Charlotte's introduction, along with the three other new characters from the freighter introduced in season four, was well received, but her storylines in later episodes had a mixed reception, though Mader's acting was praised.

== Arc ==
During season five, a young Charlotte Lewis is shown living with her parents as part of a scientific community known as the Dharma Initiative, on the island where Oceanic Flight 815 would later crash. She is confronted by an adult Daniel Faraday, who attempts to persuade her never to return to the island once she leaves, and is seen evacuating the island during the fifth-season finale "The Incident". Charlotte grows up in Bromsgrove, unaware of where she was born, and goes on to study at the University of Kent for her undergraduate degree. She earns a doctoral degree in cultural anthropology from the University of Oxford, with her interest in anthropology stemming from a desire to find her birthplace. While visiting an excavation site in the Sahara Desert, Charlotte discovers the remains of a polar bear, which has a collar bearing a Dharma Initiative logo. Businessman Charles Widmore (Alan Dale) selects Charlotte along with Daniel Faraday, Miles Straume (Ken Leung), and Frank Lapidus (Jeff Fahey), to travel on a freighter to the island where she was born, and find Widmore's rival Ben Linus (Michael Emerson). She is forced to eject from a helicopter during a lightning storm over the island.

Charlotte arrives on the island on December 23, 2004, where she is held hostage by a number of the survivors of Oceanic Flight 815, who believe that she is dangerous. She spots a flare that belongs to a member of her team, but none of the survivors wish to investigate. Charlotte becomes impatient and attempts to leave, so Ben shoots her. As she is wearing a bulletproof vest she survives, forcing Ben to reveal that Charlotte's team are looking for him, and not on a rescue mission for the survivors. When the group encounters fellow survivors Kate Austen (Evangeline Lilly) and Sayid Jarrah (Naveen Andrews) with Miles, they agree for Miles to switch places with Charlotte. After reuniting with Faraday, she tests his memory with playing cards, noting he has made progress when he can remember two out of three cards. That night, Charlotte and Faraday sneak off to the Tempest Dharma Initiative station, where they neutralize a potential source of poison gas. While getting medical supplies at the Staff Dharma Initiative station, Jin-Soo Kwon (Daniel Dae Kim) notices Charlotte smiling after his wife Sun-Hwa Kwon (Yunjin Kim) remarks in Korean that Charlotte will know Faraday likes her as she is a woman. Jin confronts Charlotte in Korean, saying he will hurt Faraday if she does not promise to take Sun off the island. Later Faraday begins to ferry survivors to the freighter, but Charlotte chooses to remain on the island, as she believes she has found her birthplace. She kisses him, then watches on as he leaves.

After Ben causes the island to vanish, Charlotte, Faraday and the remaining survivors begin to randomly travel through time. Charlotte experiences nosebleeds and headaches, and realizes she is unable to remember her mother's maiden name. During one time jump Charlotte, Faraday and Miles are captured by the Others in 1954, where Faraday proclaims his love for her. After a further time jump, her nosebleed becomes more severe, and she collapses. As she dies, Charlotte relays to Faraday that she now remembers living on the island as a child, and that she recognizes Faraday as the man who told her not to return once she left the island.

In season six the afterlife experienced by the characters is shown, in which Charlotte is set up as a blind date for James "Sawyer" Ford (Josh Holloway). The two spend the night together but when Sawyer catches her going through his belongings he throws her out of the apartment. He comes to her apartment later to apologize but she refuses, telling him he blew his chance. At a concert in the series finale, she and Faraday are reunited.

== Development ==
=== Creation and casting ===
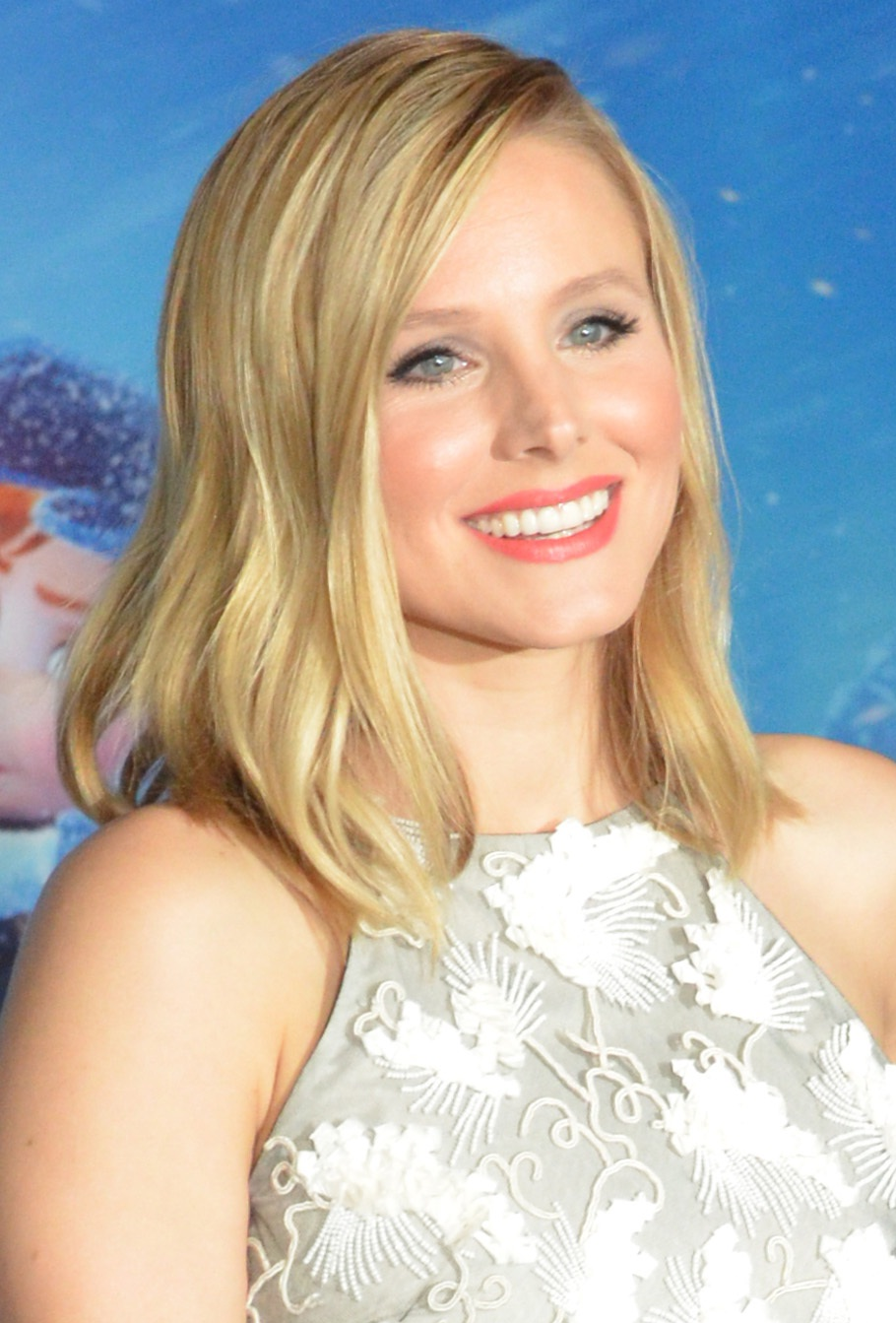
Kristen Bell turned down the role.

After Naomi (Marsha Thomason) parachuted onto the island in season three, the producers began to plan who else would be on the freighter she came from. They wanted these new characters to be scientists, who would be interested in finding the island for their own personal reasons. They decided to create a character who would be interested in lost civilizations, and named her Charlotte Staples Lewis as a reference to C. S. Lewis, which Lost producer Damon Lindelof said was a clue to the direction the show would be taking during season four.

The role was originally offered to Kristen Bell, however she chose to join Heroes as Elle Bishop instead. The producers cast English actress Rebecca Mader because "she won [them] over with her charm and presence and charisma". During casting, Charlotte was described as "a hot twentysomething ... precocious, loquacious and funny... a very successful academic who also knows how to handle herself in the real world". She also has "lots of repressed and pent-up emotions" beneath the surface. The Lost producers described her as a female version of Indiana Jones. During auditions, the producers provide fake scenes, to keep new characters' identities a secret. Mader's audition scene was a flashback that she was disappointed was not used for the show. Whilst recording her audition, a producer who was with her noticed that the shows on her résumé were from the British Broadcasting Corporation, so asked her to redo the audition again with a British accent. According to Lindelof, this "opened up another dimension [to the character that the producers] hadn't foreseen", so Charlotte was changed from American to English. Mader was pleased to be able to use her own accent, as many of her previous roles had been American characters.

Mader subsequently began to watch the first three seasons of Lost on DVD and was watching the fourth episode when she received the news that she had been chosen for the role. She watched all the previous episodes of Lost in the few weeks before she started working on the show. She found it "a really amazing moment" and felt like she had just stepped into the show. When she was cast, Mader was unaware of whether she would be a guest star, or would develop into a regular, and was planned to feature in eight episodes of season four. Mader helped develop Charlotte's outfit and was pleased to be wearing comfortable jeans and boots for the role. She only required a small amount of hair and makeup done, and stated "I just wanted to rough it. I wanted to roll around in the mud with a gun". This was a welcome change to her usual roles which required "full-on hair, makeup and heels".

=== Storyline progression ===
Charlotte's discovery of a polar bear with a Dharma Initiative collar caused fan speculation about her connection with the island. Mader herself was unaware of Charlotte's backstory beyond the flashback in "Confirmed Dead"—she noted "I feel like I'm almost in the same seat as the audience, like 'What the hell is going on?' and 'What the hell is going to happen next?', it's really exciting actually". She found it freeing to not know her character's history, and felt it made her give a natural performance. Mader felt Charlotte's relationship with Faraday allowed her character to develop and show a softer, more human side, and thought their relationship resonated with the audience as she and Jeremy Davies had good chemistry. Eight episodes of season four were written before production stopped due to the 2007–2008 Writers Guild of America strike. Once the strike was resolved, a further six episodes were written, two less than originally planned for the season, and as a result Charlotte's role continued into season five. She enjoyed speaking Korean in "Something Nice Back Home" and wished the full scene had been aired. Mader was excited when she discovered that Charlotte grew up on the island, and hoped to have scenes with Nestor Carbonell who plays Richard Alpert, as his character also has a history on the island. However, when negotiating contracts in June 2008 she found out that her character would die during season five; Mader summed up Charlotte's season five arc as her demise. Charlotte's death scene was written by Eddy Kitsis and Adam Horowitz and was amongst their favourite scenes they wrote during season five. Horowitz loved the emotion in the scene due to the audience only just learning Charlotte's backstory, and Kitsis thought Mader's performance "elevate[d] the words to a whole other level". Mader called it "the best thing [she] ha[d] ever done in [her] entire career" and enjoyed playing a significant role within the episode.

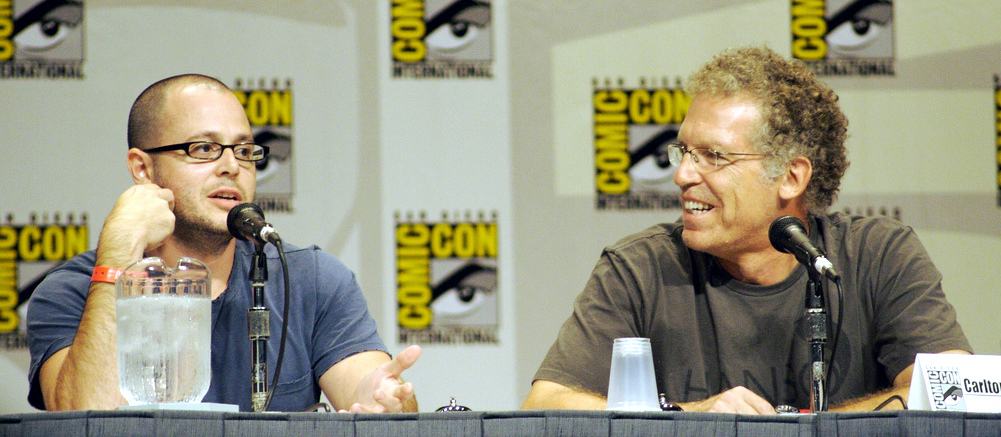
Damon Lindelof (left) and Carlton Cuse (right) wrongly blamed Mader for a continuity error.

Three episodes after Charlotte's death, Faraday sees a young Charlotte in a scene set in 1974. This created a continuity error as her date of birth was given in "Confirmed Dead" as July 2, 1979. Lost producers Damon Lindelof and Carlton Cuse explained in the "Official Lost Audio Podcast" that Mader changed the age of Charlotte so she would not be portraying someone in their mid-thirties. However Mader retaliated on her Facebook page that the timeline error was their fault and was unhappy about being blamed for it. Lindelof and Cuse clarified that it was their mistake and apologized for blaming Mader. Fellow Lost producer Greggory Nations had noticed Mader was eight years younger than the age Charlotte was originally conceived to be, so suggested Charlotte's birthday be changed to the same as Mader's, without realizing the effect this would have on the subsequent season.

Mader returned to the show for two guest appearances in season six to show Charlotte in the afterlife. Mader described Charlotte as "the role of a lifetime", and cited it as a reason that she was cast in better roles following the series' conclusion.

== Reception ==
"I think that's because these new characters were integral to the storyline. It made sense that these new people were coming on, because it was part of moving the whole storyline along where all these people were going to get off [the island]. It wasn't just adding new people and throwing them in and seeing if it stuck."

— Mader, on why she thought the freighter cast were well received

The producers of Lost were nervous about how well the new characters would be received after two characters introduced in season three, Nikki (Kiele Sanchez) and Paulo (Rodrigo Santoro), were hated by the fan community. IGN's Chris Carabott described Charlotte, as well as the other new characters from the freighter, as "great" and "exciting". James Poniewozik of Time liked the introduction of the new characters from the freighter because "Each got just one flashback and a little time on the island, and yet by the end of the episode, [he] felt [he] had a true handle on what they were like as individuals". Jeff Jensen from Entertainment Weekly liked that the "fascinating" new characters brought "mind-blowing new possibilities, and exciting new theory fodder". Oscar Dahl of BuddyTV called it the "perfect introduction". Michael Ausiello of TV Guide also liked their introduction, and praised the actors' performances.

During the season, Charlotte's storylines had mixed reactions. Jensen thought Charlotte and Faraday's mission to the Tempest in "The Other Woman" felt "forced". Dan Compora from Airlock Alpha liked Charlotte and Juliet's fight scene in this episode. BuddyTV's Oscar Dahl thought the whole plot at the Tempest was "filler" and wondered if it had been added just to give Charlotte and Faraday something to do. After Charlotte speaks Korean in "Something Nice Back Home", James Poniewozik from Time became curious about her past because she is "the member of the four freighties whom we know the least about, and the most secretive and sinister-seeming of the bunch". Chris Carabott was also intrigued after this scene, which he called "one of the more unexpected scenes".

Carabott felt Charlotte's death could have been explored further, but as there was so much happening in the episode not enough time was made for her death. Alan Sepinwall of The Star-Ledger noted it was Jeremy Davies portrayal of Faraday's grief that made him care about her death. Cynthia Littleton from Variety said this was one of the few times Charlotte did not annoy her, as she acts as a translator for Jin, "finally do[ing] something worthwhile". Noel Murray of The A.V. Club felt distracted by Charlotte in this episode, because her reaction to time travel was different from what was shown in "The Constant", and found it "incredibly awkward" when Charlotte explained her whole backstory to Faraday. TV Guide's Mickey O'Connor praised Mader's acting, saying "Well done, Rebecca Mader, who has really done some fine work on Lost".
