= Sonya Walger =

British and American actress

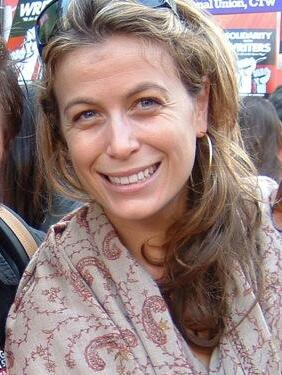
- Walger in 2007
- Born: June 6, 1974 (age 52); London, England
- Citizenship: United Kingdom; United States (since 2013)
- Education: Christ Church, Oxford (First Class Honours)
- Occupations: Actress, writer
- Years active: 1998-present
- Spouse: Davey Holmes (m. 2009)
- Children: 2
- Website: sonya-walger.com

Sonya Walger (born June 6, 1974) is a British and American actress. She had a starring role in the HBO sitcom The Mind of the Married Man (2001–2002) before landing her role as Penny Widmore in the ABC drama series Lost (2006–2010). Walger later starred on Tell Me You Love Me (2007), FlashForward (2009–2010), Common Law (2012), The Catch (2016–2017), and For all Mankind (2019–2022).

== Early life ==
Walger was born in London, England, and educated at the independent Wycombe Abbey School and at Christ Church, Oxford, where she studied English Literature, receiving a first class degree. Walger is conversational in French and fluent in Spanish, as her father was Argentinian.

== Career ==
Walger began her career on British television. In 1998, she appeared in an episode of ITV crime series, Midsomer Murders - Death of a Hollow Man. She had a recurring role in the BBC 1 sitcom Goodnight Sweetheart in 1999, and appeared in two episodes of the crime/drama The Vice. Also in 1999, she played the daughter of newspaper magnate Max Van der Vuurst, Hilde, in the Heat of the Sun story "The Sport of Kings". The following year, Walger made her film debut in the biographical drama Eisenstein. In 2001, she moved to the United States and was cast as Donna Barnes on the HBO comedy series, The Mind of the Married Man. The series was cancelled after two seasons. In 2003, she starred on the short-lived U.S. version of Coupling, which aired on NBC. In 2004, Walger played Nicole Noone opposite Noah Wyle in the TNT television film, The Librarian: Quest for the Spear, for which she received Saturn Award for Best Supporting Actress on Television nomination.

From 2006 to 2010, Walger had a recurring role as Penny Widmore in the ABC drama series, Lost. She also had recurring roles on Sleeper Cell, CSI: NY, and Terminator: The Sarah Connor Chronicles. In 2007, Walger appeared in the original Broadway production of Frost/Nixon, as Charlotte Cushing, David Frost's then-girlfriend. Then she starred in the HBO series Tell Me You Love Me. From 2009 to 2010, Walger starred as Olivia Benford, a surgeon and wife of FBI agent Mark Benford (Joseph Fiennes) in the ABC series, FlashForward. Later in 2010, she appeared as Julia in season 3 of the HBO drama series In Treatment. She played John Cusack's wife in the 2011 Direct-to-video crime thriller The Factory. In 2012, she was regular cast member in the USA Network short lived series Common Law. In 2013, Walger had a brief role in the comedy film Admission, as a Virginia Woolf scholar. From 2013 to 2014, Walger appeared on the NBC drama series Parenthood.

In 2014, Walger guest-starred in Shonda Rhimes's series Scandal as Katherine Winslow. The following year, Walger was cast in the new Rhimes series The Catch, co-starring opposite Mireille Enos and Peter Krause.

In 2018 she had a recurring role in her husband's show Get Shorty as Lila, an Argentine drug lord.

In 2019, Walger starred as NASA astronaut Molly Cobb in the first season of the Apple TV+ original science fiction space drama series For All Mankind. In 2021 and 2022, Walger returned for seasons two and three.

In 2024, she starred in horror thriller New Life along with Hayley Erin.

In 2025, Walger's debut novel, Lion, was published. A piece of autobiographical fiction, the novel is about the relationship between an actress and her father. The novel received acclaim and was shortlisted for the Carol Shields Prize for Fiction in 2026. Walger's second novel, Wifehouse, was published in April 2026.

In March 2026, she was cast as the Norse goddess Freya in the upcoming live-action adaptation of the two Norse mythology-based video games in the God of War series.

== Personal life ==
Walger married screenwriter/producer Davey Holmes in July 2009. She gave birth to a daughter on 14 February 2013. She gave birth to a son in 2015. Walger became a U.S. citizen on 23 May 2013.

== Filmography ==
=== Film ===
Year	Title	Role	Notes
2000	Eisenstein	Zina	
2001	The Search for John Gissing	Sister Mary	
2002	40	Alice	Short film
2006	Caffeine	Gloria	
2012	The Factory	Shelley	
2013	Admission	Helen	
2013	Cold Turkey	Lindsay	
2014	The Gambler	Angelina	Uncredited
2015	The Escort	Samantha	
2016	Summer of 8	Diane	
2018	Anon	Kristen	
2018	Then Came You	Claire	
2019	Clementine	D.	
2019	Bad Impulse	Christine Sharpe	
2020	Darkness Falls	Jane Wilson	
2023	New Life	Elsa Gray	
2025	Forge	Ann Lasalle	

=== Television ===
Year	Title	Role	Notes
1998	Heat of the Sun	Hilde Van der Vuurst	Episode: "The Sport of Kings"
1998	Mosley	Barbara Hutchinson	Episode: "Breaking the Mould"
1998	Midsomer Murders	Becky Smith	Episode: "Death of a Hollow Man"
1999	The Vice	Emma	Episodes: "Dabbling: Part 1" and "Dabbling: Part 2"
1999	Noah's Ark	Miriam	Miniseries
1999	Goodnight Sweetheart	Flic	3 episodes
1999	Dangerfield	Ana Mogollon Cabrera	Episode: "Diminished Responsibility"
1999	All the King's Men	Lady Frances	Television film
2001–2002	The Mind of the Married Man	Donna Barnes	Series regular, 20 episodes
2003	Coupling	Sally Harper	Series regular, 10 episodes
2004	The Librarian: Quest for the Spear	Nicole Noone	Television film Nominated— Saturn Award for Best Supporting Actress on Television
2004–2006	CSI: NY	Jane Parsons	10 episodes
2005–2006	Sleeper Cell	Special Agent Patrice Serxner	4 episodes
2006	Numb3rs	Susan Berry	Episode: "All's Fair"
2006–2010	Lost	Penelope 'Penny' Widmore	13 episodes Nominated— Saturn Award for Best Guest Starring Role on Television (2009)
2007	Tell Me You Love Me	Carolyn	Series regular, 10 episodes
2008	Sweet Nothing in My Ear	Joanna Tate	Television film
2008	Terminator: The Sarah Connor Chronicles	Michelle Dixon	5 episodes
2009–2010	FlashForward	Dr. Olivia Benford	Series regular, 22 episodes
2010	In Treatment	Julia	3 episodes
2012	Law & Order: Special Victims Unit	Anne Barnes	Episode: "Father Dearest"
2012	Common Law	Dr. Elise Ryan	Series regular, 12 episodes
2013–2014	Parenthood	Meredith Peet	6 episodes
2014	The Good Sister	Kate / Linda	Television film
2014	Scandal	Katherine Winslow	Episodes: "Inside the Bubble" and "The Key"
2014	Elementary	Angela White	Episode: "The Five Orange Pipz"
2014–2015	Power	Madeline Stern	4 episodes
2015	The Leftovers	Dr. Allison Herbert (voice)	Episode: "The Lens"
2015	Scorpion	Olivia Cromwell	Episode: "US vs. UN vs. UK"
2016–2017	The Catch	Margot Bishop	Series regular
2016	Criminal Minds: Beyond Borders	Marion Codwell	Episode: "The Matchmaker"
2017	Ghosted	Eckhart	Episode: "Sam"
2018	Get Shorty	Lila	6 episodes
2019–2022	For All Mankind	Molly Cobb	17 episodes
2022	Night Sky	Hanna	2 episodes
TBA	God of War †	Freya	Supporting role

== Bibliography ==
- Lion (2025)
- Wifehouse (2026)
