= Greatest Hits (Lost) =

- Lost episode
- Episode no.: Season 3 Episode 21
- Directed by: Stephen Williams
- Written by: Edward Kitsis; Adam Horowitz
- Production code: 321
- Original air date: May 16, 2007
- Running time: 43 minutes

Guest appearances
- Tania Raymonde as Alex; Blake Bashoff as Karl; Néstor Carbonell as Richard Alpert; Mira Furlan as Danielle Rousseau; Brian Goodman as Ryan Pryce; Marsha Thomason as Naomi Dorrit; Neil Hopkins as Liam Pace; John Henry Canavan as Simon Pace; L. Scott Caldwell as Rose Nadler; Sam Anderson as Bernard Nadler; Andrea Gabriel as Nadia Jazeem; Lana Parrilla as Greta; Jeremy Shada as Young Charlie Pace; Zack Shada as Young Liam Pace; Tracy Middendorf as Bonnie; Joshua Hancock as Roderick

Episode chronology
← Previous "The Man Behind the Curtain"	Next → "Through the Looking Glass"
- Lost season 3

"Greatest Hits" is the 21st episode of the third season of Lost and 70th episode of the series. It was written by co-executive producers Edward Kitsis and Adam Horowitz and directed by supervising producer Stephen Williams. The episode first aired on May 16, 2007, on ABC in the United States and on CTV in Canada. "Greatest Hits" was viewed by 12 million Americans and was well received by critics. Lost's editors received a Golden Reel Award nomination.

The episode takes place on December 22, 2004, 92 days after the crash of Oceanic Airlines Flight 815. A group of survivors prepare for an upcoming raid on their camp by the "Others", while the rest prepare to contact a nearby freighter. Charlie Pace (played by Dominic Monaghan) recounts the five greatest moments of his life, which are depicted in flashbacks, as he prepares to fulfill Desmond Hume's (Henry Ian Cusick) premonitions of his death.

== Plot ==
The Others' leader Ben Linus (Michael Emerson) orders ten of the Others to go to the survivors' camp to kidnap any pregnant women that night—a night earlier than was scheduled. Ben's adopted daughter Alex (Tania Raymonde) persuades her boyfriend Karl (Blake Bashoff) to canoe to the survivors' beach to warn them. The survivors' leader Jack Shephard (Matthew Fox) plans to kill the ambushing Others with dynamite retrieved by island resident Danielle Rousseau (Mira Furlan). Sayid Jarrah (Naveen Andrews), Jin Kwon (Daniel Dae Kim) and Bernard Nadler (Sam Anderson) are selected to stay behind to shoot the dynamite-rigged tents when the Others arrive.

Desmond tells Charlie about his latest premonition: Charlie's girlfriend Claire Littleton (Emilie de Ravin) and her baby Aaron will escape the island via helicopter if Charlie flips a switch in a Dharma Initiative station and drowns. Sayid tells Jack that he may be able to communicate with the freighter roughly 130 kilometres offshore. He can use the satellite phone of Naomi Dorrit (Marsha Thomason), the helicopter parachutist who landed on the Island. Once he goes to the radio tower to disable Rousseau's distress signal. Juliet Burke (Elizabeth Mitchell) informs Sayid that this will not work because the underwater "Looking Glass" is blocking outgoing transmissions. Sayid realizes that a cable he found seventy days before connects to this station and that they will need someone to go on a probable suicide mission there, and Charlie volunteers.

Naomi tells Charlie that his band Drive Shaft released a successful greatest hits album after the crash of Flight 815. Flashbacks show Charlie's "greatest hits" of his life, referring to his life's five best moments, in descending order. Charlie writes them down on a note.

- The first time that he heard his band's breakout song on the radio.
- When his father, Simon (John Henry Canavan), taught him how to swim at Butlins.
- The time when his brother Liam (Neil Hopkins) gave him their grandfather Dextor Stratton's "DS" ring, for which Drive Shaft is named, as a Christmas present. The ring was a family heirloom passed down to the firstborn child, but Liam viewed himself as a mess and thought of Charlie to be more deserving.
- When Charlie saved a woman, Nadia, from being mugged and was called a hero as no one else helped her. Unbeknownst to Charlie, Nadia was Sayid's loved one.
- The night following the crash, when he first met the then-pregnant Claire.

— Charlie's list

Before paddling out to the Looking Glass with Desmond, Charlie assures Claire he will be fine, kisses her goodbye and leaves his ring in Aaron's crib. Once Desmond and Charlie arrive over the station, Charlie gives Desmond his note and asks that he give it to Claire. Desmond offers to do the job instead, saying that he suspects that his flashes are recommending that he take Charlie's place. To keep him from doing so, Charlie knocks Desmond out with an oar and dives into the water. Upon entering the station, two Others named Greta (Lana Parrilla) and Bonnie (Tracy Middendorf) appear with guns aimed at Charlie.

== Production ==
Most of the island scenes were filmed from April 9, 2007 to April 12. A detailed episode synopsis was uploaded online before the episode aired and Disney investigated the leak. The name of the Dharma station in the episode is an allusion to Lewis Carroll's novel Through the Looking-Glass. Dominic Monaghan was inspired by Leonardo DiCaprio's underwater performance in Titanic and opened his mouth briefly underwater to appear under greater duress.

This episode began the resolution of the story arc about Desmond's prophecy regarding Charlie's inevitable death, which began earlier in the season and would ultimately end in the finale. The storyline was conceived while producing the latter part of the second season when the writers were brainstorming ideas for a new storyline for Charlie. While Desmond could have had flashes of the future about anyone, Charlie was chosen over a less significant character so the story would have higher stakes. Additionally, the writers decided it would be a great way to bring out the heroic side of Charlie, with Charlie being the only character to die willingly. Despite the problems in Charlie's life, the writers believed that Charlie always was a good person and wanted to show that with the happiest moments of the character's life. Monaghan thought that "Greatest Hits" was made "to allow the audience to sit with [his character's fate] long enough to prepare themselves for what was going to happen [in the finale]".

"Greatest Hits" marked the first appearance for married couple Rose and Bernard since the late second season and fans welcomed the recurring characters' return. The writers cited the actors' other projects as a reason for their absence. Additionally, it was feared that fans would complain if they appeared, when many actors with star billing had received limited screentime in the early third season. The writers also commented that they do not want to have the couple on the show if they are just going to be standing in the background; they want to have Rose and Bernard in the show with interesting storylines.

== Reception ==
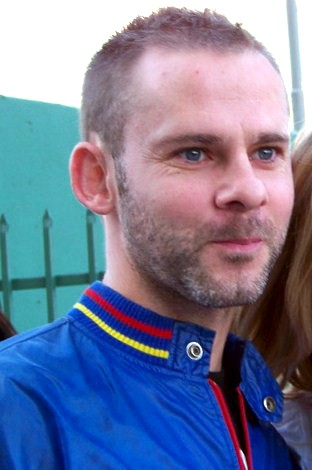
More of the backstory of Monaghan's character Charlie is featured in "Greatest Hits".

"Greatest Hits" brought in an average of 12.32 million American viewers, making Lost the fifteenth most watched series of the week; this was consistent with previous Lost episodes in the same timeslot. The first half was viewed by 11.9 million, and the audience increased to 12.8 million in the second half. The episode received a 5.2/14 in the key adults 18–49 demographic, placing it as the top-rated scripted program for the night. In Canada, "Greatest Hits" was seen by 875,000 people, ranking twenty-seventh for the week. In the United Kingdom, the episode attracted 1.21 million viewers, and was the second most watched program of the week on the non-terrestrial channels, beaten only by Katie & Peter: The Next Chapter. In Australia, Lost was the fifty-first most viewed show of the week, bringing in 1.001 million viewers.

Patrick Day of the Los Angeles Times thought that "as far as penultimate set-up-to-the-big-finale episodes go, 'Greatest Hits' was above par in more than one way." Day celebrated the return of Jack "from Mt. Boring", the use of drums in Michael Giacchino's musical score and the return of Rose and Bernard. Jeff Jensen of Entertainment Weekly wrote that Monaghan "turned in his best performance yet on Lost" and described the final scene as "breathtaking" with "a stunningly realized, Emmy-worthy triumph of F/X." Kristin Veitch of E! also enjoyed Monaghan's acting and called the episode a "perfect example" of the series' high quality. Charlie McCollum of the San Jose Mercury News described the latter episodes of the third season as "an absolute thrill ride". Chris Carabott of IGN rated the episode as an 8.5/10, commending the character development of Jack and Charlie, and the acting skills of Emerson, who portrays Ben. Lulu Bates of Television Without Pity graded the episode as an "A−". Erin Martell of AOL's TV Squad rated "Greatest Hits" as a 6/7, saying that it succeeded in building momentum for the season finale, but pointed out the plot inconsistency regarding Charlie's (in)ability to swim. Scott Juba of The Trades decided "Greatest Hits" was the best episode of the third season, saying that the flashbacks "evok[e] the type of identifiable human emotions that drives the success of Lost. The true genius of the show lies not in its plot twists or mysteries but rather in its ability to make the audience invested in the characters by evoking themes that almost anyone can identify with." Jon Lachonis of BuddyTV noted that the episode was "wildly successful" in turning Charlie into a likeable and relatable character.

This episode was submitted for consideration for Outstanding Directing and Outstanding Writing for a Drama Series for the 59th Primetime Emmy Awards. This episode was nominated for the Golden Reel Award in the Best Sound Editing in Television: Short Form – Dialogue and Automated Dialogue Replacement category.
