= Through the Looking Glass (Lost) =

- Lost episodes
- Charlie warns Desmond about the freighter.
- Episode nos.: Season 3 Episodes 22 and 23
- Directed by: Jack Bender
- Written by: Carlton Cuse; Damon Lindelof
- Production codes: 322 & 323
- Original air date: May 23, 2007
- Running time: 85 minutes

Guest appearances
- Malcolm David Kelley as Walt Lloyd; M. C. Gainey as Tom; Tania Raymonde as Alex; Blake Bashoff as Karl; Andrew Divoff as Mikhail Bakunin; Mira Furlan as Danielle Rousseau; Brian Goodman as Ryan Pryce; Marsha Thomason as Naomi Dorrit; L. Scott Caldwell as Rose Nadler; Sam Anderson as Bernard Nadler; Lana Parrilla as Greta; Tracy Middendorf as Bonnie; James Lesure as Dr. Rob Hamill; Nestor Carbonell as Richard Alpert; Sonya Walger as Penny Widmore; Julie Bowen as Sarah; Roxanne Day as Diane; Nigel Gibbs as Funeral director; Ariston Green as Jason; Joah Buley as Luke; Dustin Geiger as Matthew; Teddy Wells as Ivan; Kathleen M. Darcy as Flight attendant; Kate Connor as Doctor

Episode chronology
← Previous "Greatest Hits"	Next → "The Beginning of the End"
- Lost season 3

"Through the Looking Glass" is the third-season finale of the ABC television series Lost, consisting of the 22nd and 23rd episodes of the third season. It is also the 71st and 72nd episodes overall. The episodes were written by co-creator/executive producer Damon Lindelof and executive producer Carlton Cuse, and directed by executive producer Jack Bender. It first aired on May 23, 2007 in the United States and Canada and was watched by an average of 14 million American viewers. Like the previous two season finales, it was two hours long with advertisements, twice the length of a normal episode. It was edited into two individual episodes when released on DVD. The episode garnered a number of awards and nominations, including three Primetime Emmy Awards nominations and a Directors Guild of America Award nomination.

== Plot ==
The episode begins in late December 2004, over ninety days after the crash of Oceanic Airlines Flight 815. The battle between the crash survivors and the mysterious island inhabitants referred to as the Others comes to an end as ten of the Others attack and are ambushed at the survivor’s camp and subsequently killed. Meanwhile, Jack Shephard (Matthew Fox) leads most of the survivors to the radio tower to communicate with a nearby ship. Intercut with this story are off-island scenes spotlighting Jack, who is shown as being suicidally depressed and addicted to painkillers.

=== Flash sequences ===
Jack is shown to be depressed, bearded, heavily drinking and addicted to oxycodone. After reading about the death of someone he knew, Jack prepares to commit suicide by jumping off the Sixth Street Viaduct bridge. However, a car crash occurs on the bridge before he jumps and he goes to the victims; it is later revealed that the driver crashed after being distracted by Jack. Later, Jack visits the memorial service for the person he knew and finds himself to be the only attendee. In the last flash, Kate appears and Jack discusses the island with her. In a twist ending, it becomes clear that the sequences are actually flashforwards. Jack talks about using the golden pass they received from Oceanic Airlines to fly across the Pacific Ocean every week in the hope that he will crash back on the island. Jack laments about having to lie and that they should never have left. Kate disagrees and leaves while Jack desperately tells her that "we have to go back!".

=== On the island ===
The Others intend to attack the camp and kidnap pregnant women for scientific research. The survivors are tipped off by the Other Karl (Blake Bashoff) and plan to kill the Others with dynamite. Sayid Jarrah (Naveen Andrews), Jin Kwon (Daniel Dae Kim), and Bernard Nadler (Sam Anderson) remain at the beach, tasked with igniting the dynamite while the rest of the survivors go with Danielle Rousseau (Mira Furlan) to the radio tower to communicate with Naomi Dorrit’s (Marsha Thomason) nearby ship.

The Others arrive, and while Sayid and Bernard detonate their targets, Jin misses, which results in their capture. After hearing only two explosions, James "Sawyer" Ford (Josh Holloway) and Juliet Burke (Elizabeth Mitchell) go back to the beach. Hugo "Hurley" Reyes (Jorge Garcia) drives the van he found onto the beach, and the captives gain the upper hand, killing the remaining Others with the help of Sawyer and Juliet. Tom (M.C. Gainey) surrenders but Sawyer kills him as revenge for kidnapping Walt.

=== In The Looking Glass ===
Charlie Pace (Dominic Monaghan) is captured by the resident Others Greta (Lana Parrilla) and Bonnie (Tracy Middendorf). Ben Linus (Michael Emerson) learns of Charlie's infiltration and sends Mikhail Bakunin (Andrew Divoff) to the station to kill them to protect the signal jammer. Mikhail arrives and kills Greta and Bonnie, but is shot with a spear gun by Desmond Hume (Henry Ian Cusick) who hid in the station after diving down after Charlie. Getting the code from Bonnie before she dies (the notes to the middle eight of "Good Vibrations" by The Beach Boys), Charlie disables the jammer and is contacted by Penny Widmore (Sonya Walger) through video transmission. Penny informs Charlie that she does not know Naomi and did not send the boat that Naomi claims to be from. Mikhail manages to swim out of the station and destroys the window of the room with a grenade, killing himself and flooding the communications room. Charlie locks the door to save Desmond, but before he drowns, Charlie writes "NOT PENNYS BOAT" on his hand as a warning to Desmond about the freighter.

John Locke (Terry O'Quinn) has been shot by Ben. Finding his legs paralyzed again, Locke is about to commit suicide, when he is stopped by Walt Lloyd (Malcolm David Kelley). Walt tells John that he has the use of his legs and that he has "work to do". Meanwhile, Ben tells Richard Alpert (Nestor Carbonell) to lead the rest of the Others to the Temple and leaves the Others with his adopted daughter Alex (Tania Raymonde) – Rousseau's daughter and Karl's girlfriend – to meet up with the survivors to persuade Jack not to call Naomi's ship for rescue.

Kate is upset about Sawyer not wanting her to come back to the beach with him to rescue Sayid, Jin and Bernard. Jack tells her it is because Sawyer was trying to protect her. When she asks why Jack is defending Sawyer, Jack informs Kate that it is because he loves her. Ben and Alex intercept Jack's group; Ben informs Jack that Naomi is not who she says she is, and making contact with her boat will be disastrous for everyone. Ben orders the shooting of Sayid, Jin, and Bernard, and when Jack hears three shots, he attacks Ben. Unknown to Jack, the shots were fired into the sand, following earlier orders from Ben. Rousseau meets her daughter (Alex), who was kidnapped by the Others shortly after her birth. The survivors, now able to get a signal, arrive at the radio tower. Rousseau disables her distress signal, freeing the frequency for Naomi. However, Naomi is stabbed by Locke, who threatens to kill Jack if he calls Naomi's boat. Locke cannot bring himself to kill Jack, who communicates with George Minkowski (Fisher Stevens) on Naomi's boat. Minkowski tells the survivors they will be sending rescue.

== Production ==
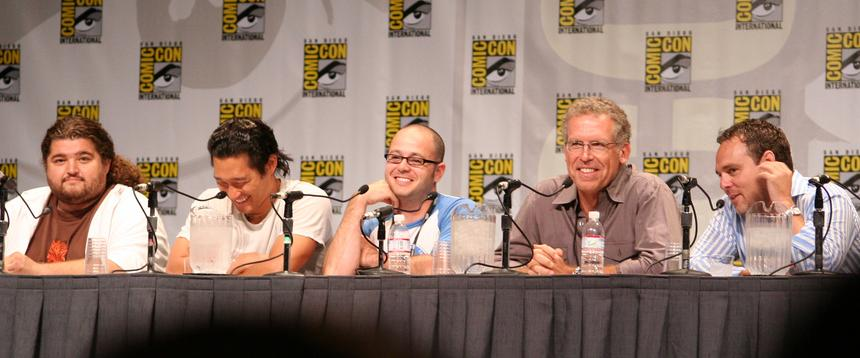
From left to right: actors Jorge Garcia and Daniel Dae Kim with executive producers Damon Lindelof, Carlton Cuse and Bryan Burk

The episode's title is an allusion to Lewis Carroll's novel Through the Looking-Glass and a reference to the fictitious DHARMA Initiative station featured in the previous episode. Shooting began on April 13, 2007 and ended on May 7, 2007. The writers were so far behind schedule that parts of the episode were shot while later parts were still being written. Filming mostly took place on Oahu, Hawaii, with additional scenes shot in Los Angeles. The hospital scenes were filmed on the same sets used for the ABC show Grey's Anatomy.

Despite not being mentioned in the official press release, then-15-year-old Malcolm David Kelley, who was a main cast member in Season 1, returned to reprise his role as 10-year-old Walt Lloyd, and received credit as a "special guest star". Kelley's character had left the island in the second-season finale, only 26 days prior to the events of "Through the Looking Glass"; however, Kelley had not filmed an episode in over a year. In his scene, Walt has visibly aged, appears taller and has a deeper voice. The producers had hoped that Harold Perrineau, who plays Walt's father Michael Dawson, would return in this episode, but he was filming the pilot for CBS' Demons. Damon Lindelof and Carlton Cuse lent their voices for the unseen roles of the flight captain and newscaster, respectively.

The set of the Looking Glass communications room

This episode concluded the story arc about Charlie's death, which began earlier in the season when Desmond prophesied Charlie's death. Throughout the season, Charlie escaped death; however, Desmond told Charlie that he had to die in order for his girlfriend, Claire Littleton and the rest of the survivors to be rescued from the island. The storyline of Charlie's death was conceived while producing the latter part of the second season, after the storyline of Charlie's drug addiction finished. The news of his character's death was broken to Monaghan two episodes in advance, to which Monaghan felt "relief" for knowing his future on the show. On the night of Monaghan's second-to-last day on set, he was presented with a canoe paddle that had been made by the cast and crew. Monaghan hoped to return to Lost as a guest star in flashbacks or dreams.

Jack Bender stated that Matthew Fox "really commits body and soul into the story he's telling" and Fox questioned whether he had ever been more tired than while shooting the double episode. Like the other Lost season finales, the final cliffhanger scene was given a codename—"The Rattlesnake in the Mailbox"—and kept top secret. After Lindelof and Cuse wrote the scene, only Fox, Lilly, Bender, and co-executive producer Jean Higgins were given copies of the script. The scene was shot with a green screen in an abandoned Honolulu parking lot with the airport edited in. Despite the security measures, a complete and detailed episode synopsis was uploaded online over a week before the episode aired. Disney investigated the leak. The leak prompted Lindelof and Cuse to enter "radio silence", which was temporarily broken at the 2007 San Diego Comic-Con. The funeral parlor that Jack visits is called "Hoffs/Drawlar", which is an anagram of "flashforward". The idea of flashforwards was conceived by creators Lindelof and Abrams during the show's conception. However, Cuse and Lindelof only started fleshing out the idea at the end of the first season, after they realized that flashbacks would eventually stop being revelatory and knew that they would eventually have to switch to flashforwards. With the announcement that the series would conclude 48 episodes after "Through the Looking Glass", they felt comfortable playing flashforwards as early as the third-season finale.

Post-production wrapped on May 21, 2007, only two days before it aired on television. The score was composed by series musician Michael Giacchino, while popular music was also featured throughout the episode. Charlie also sings a song in the episode that was written by Dominic Monaghan. Due to the episode's length, it was split into two parts in some countries and when it was released on DVD. Unlike most episodes, this episode did not feature a "previously on Lost…" recap at the start of the episode when it first aired; however, it was originally preceded by a clip-show titled "Lost: The Answers", which recapped the third season. Cuse said that he and Lindelof think the finale is "very cool [and] we're very proud of it." Stephen McPherson, the president of ABC Entertainment, called "Through the Looking Glass" "one of the best episodes" of the series. Buena Vista Home Entertainment released "Through the Looking Glass" on the season's DVD and Blu-ray Disc sets on December 11, 2007, in Region 1. A featurette called "Lost: On Location" features cast and crew discussing production of select episodes, including "Through the Looking Glass". The episode was rerun for the first time on January 30, 2008, with on-screen text in the lower third of the screen, similar to VH1's Pop-up Video. These pop-ups were not written by Lost's writers due to the 2007–2008 Writers Guild of America strike; they were written by the marketing company Met/Hodder. This enhanced edition was viewed by almost 9 million Americans.

== Reception ==
=== Ratings ===
In the U.S., the episode brought in the best ratings for Lost in fifteen episodes. The two-hour Wednesday broadcast on ABC made Lost the fourth most watched series of the week with an average of 13.86 million American viewers, below the third season average of 14.6 million. The first hour was viewed by 12.67 million, and the audience increased to 15.04 million in the second hour. The episode received a 5.9/15 in the key adults 18–49 demographic. In the United Kingdom, the episode attracted 1.21 million viewers, and was the second most watched program of the week on the non-terrestrial channels, beaten only by Katie & Peter: The Next Chapter. In Australia, Lost was the thirty-seventh most viewed show of the week, bringing in 1.17 million viewers. In Canada, the episode placed sixteenth for the first half, with 911,000 viewers and fifteenth for the second half, with 938,000 viewers. The episodes were broadcast before and after American Idol.

=== Critical response ===
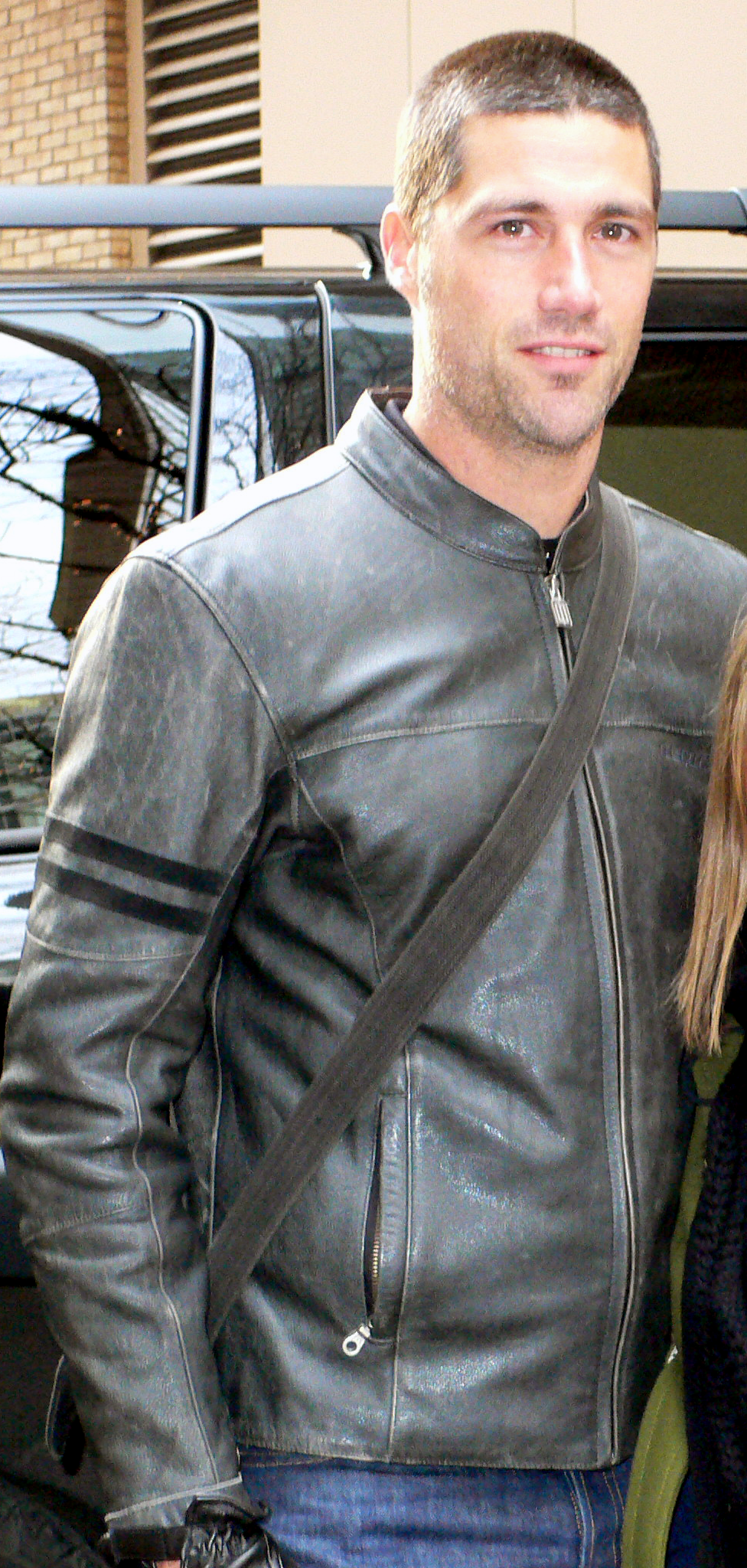
BuddyTV praised Fox's lead performance as "Emmy worthy"

The episode garnered universal critical acclaim. The Los Angeles Times wrote that the episode was "an unusually action-packed and sanguinary spring cleaning that… left a host of… characters… dead", Access Atlanta said "it was deeply satisfying. The first hour started a bit slow but the second hour had great twists, wonderfully emotional moments, both happy and sad", and the Associated Press said that "the powerful season-ending episode redeemed the series with the shrewdness and intrigue that made it so addictive in the first place." The San Francisco Chronicle wrote that "not only was the pace fast, the teases taut, and the answers plenty, the writers took a compelling gamble… [by telling] viewers that in the future… maybe all… of the people on the Lost island get off. They get their wish. But in Jack, our guide through this series, the writers definitively say, 'Be careful what you wish for.'" The San Jose Mercury News called the finale a "jaw-dropping exercise in good storytelling." The Pittsburgh Post-Gazette commented that the flashforward "twist gave the saga renewed momentum as it begins its march toward a 2010 finish." The season finale was summed up as "a mind-blower, for sure, a radical two hours that gave us major fake-outs, an army of dead bodies, the possibility of rescue [and] diverse portraits of heroism" by The Boston Globe, who added that the death of Charlie was "the most touching loss of the series so far." The Palm Beach Post and Wizard named it the "Best Cliffhanger" of 2007. The Chicago Tribune called it "a qualified success" with excellent pacing and action, however, the flashforward scenes were thought to be uninteresting and "clumsy". Time ranked the episode as the best of 2007 and the "Rattlesnake in the Mailbox" as one of the ten best scenes of 2007 television.

The Futon Critic placed the episode first in the site's annual "50 Best Episodes" list. E! said that "Through the Looking Glass" was possibly "the best episode ever of the entire series." TV Guide described "Through the Looking Glass" as "a dizzying exercise in adventure, sustained tension and time-shifting rug pulling [that was] spectacularly produced, amazingly directed and gloriously acted." IGN gave the double episode a perfect 10/10 – the best review of the season – saying it was "nothing short of a masterpiece of storytelling with a brilliantly paced narrative." IGN would conclude that the flashforward was the "Biggest Shock" in 2007 television. Both IGN and The Los Angeles Times would later declare "Through the Looking Glass" as the second-best Lost episode, behind "The Constant". BuddyTV praised the unpredictability, saying that "no other show can even attempt to do what Lost does." BuddyTV would later call "Through the Looking Glass" the best finale of 2007 and Charlie's death the saddest TV death of 2007. "Through the Looking Glass" was TV.com's "Editor's Choice" for "Best Episode" of 2007. AOL's TV Squad gave the episode a 7/7, noting that "the writers followed through on Desmond's premonitions and successfully delivered the highly anticipated game-changer." Television Without Pity gave the third-season finale an "A". The Sydney Morning Herald wrote that Lost "may have unjumped [the shark] with [the] flashforward." Entertainment Weekly ranked it as one of the top ten episodes of 2007, saying that the cliffhanger "[revealed] new dimensions to [Lost's] creative world." Zap2It questioned "whether to be deeply frustrated (again), really, really confused (a distinct possibility) or just in awe of the incredible mind-(ahem) show runners… have pulled off." The writing for Locke was criticized, and one IGN writer said that "it seems irrational that he would go and [stab Naomi] in the back without explaining himself." Lindelof stated "that we might be willing to give [Locke] the benefit of the doubt for any action he took in response to [lying, gut shot, in a pit of Dharma corpses for two days and on the verge of taking his own life], even if considered slightly 'out of character'." Film and television director and writer Kevin Smith said that "to do [3] seasons and then suddenly throw a massive curveball is just so dramatically satisfying, you just take your hats off to the writers in a big, bad way."

=== Awards ===
This episode was nominated for Outstanding Directing, Outstanding Writing, and Outstanding Single-Camera Picture Editing for a Drama Series for the 59th Primetime Emmy Awards, but failed to win in any of the categories. This episode was also submitted for consideration for Outstanding Drama Series; however, it was not nominated. For his work on this episode, Jack Bender was nominated for the Directors Guild of America Award for Outstanding Directing – Drama Series.
