= S.O.S. (Lost) =

- Lost episode
- Episode no.: Season 2 Episode 19
- Directed by: Eric Laneuville
- Written by: Steven Maeda; Leonard Dick
- Production code: 219
- Original air date: April 12, 2006
- Running time: 43 minutes

Guest appearances
- L. Scott Caldwell as Rose Nadler; Sam Anderson as Bernard Nadler; Wayne Pygram as Isaac of Uluru; Michael Emerson as Henry Gale; Donna Smallwood as Isaac's assistant

Episode chronology
← Previous "Dave"	Next → "Two for the Road"
- Lost season 2

"S.O.S." is the 19th episode of the second season of Lost and the 44th episode overall. The episode was directed by Eric Laneuville, and written by Steven Maeda and Leonard Dick. It first aired on April 12, 2006, on ABC. The characters of Rose Henderson (L. Scott Caldwell) and Bernard Nadler (Sam Anderson) are featured in the episode's flashbacks.

== Plot ==
=== Flashbacks ===
Bernard and Rose are seen meeting for the first time when he helps get her car unstuck from the snow. Rose, initially reluctant to accept his help, ultimately manages to free the car with his support. In return for his assistance, she offers to buy him a cup of coffee.

Bernard and Rose are lunching with a view of Niagara Falls, five months after their first meeting. At this point, Bernard proposes to Rose, citing that they "fell into this rhythm". Rose, without giving an answer, reveals she is terminally ill with cancer, and has a year left to live, perhaps slightly longer. Bernard nevertheless reaffirms his proposal, to which Rose responds with an affirmative.

On their honeymoon, Bernard takes her to Australia to see a faith healer, Isaac of Uluru (Wayne Pigram). Rose becomes angry and says, "I have made my peace with what's happening to me." However, Bernard succeeds in persuading Rose to talk to Isaac, who states that his office is on top of a place of great energy, perhaps magnetic or geological. He says he will attempt to harness that energy to give it to others. However, he says he is unable to help Rose because the energy in Australia is not the right kind for her. He even offers to return Bernard's money, but Rose tells him to keep it, saying that she will tell Bernard that Isaac "fixed" her so that Bernard would stop trying to save her life.

In the airport, Rose drops her pills while waiting for a boarding call. Locke, still in his wheelchair, returns them to her.

=== On the beach ===
Rose Henderson and Bernard Nadler are bickering over the recent arrival of DHARMA Initiative food drops. Bernard posits that the other survivors had already "given up" on being rescued.

Jack approaches James "Sawyer" Ford (Josh Holloway) and Kate Austen (Evangeline Lilly) to explain his plan for a prisoner exchange. Jack invites Kate to accompany him into the jungle, and she agrees to come.

Bernard enlists Hugo "Hurley" Reyes (Jorge Garcia) to gather the survivors for an impromptu meeting. Bernard admonishes the others for losing their will to be rescued. He, citing the supply plane that must have dropped the DHARMA rations, suggests to create a SOS sign. Rose shoots down the plan, dismissing it as giving the others "false hope". Bernard asks Charlie Pace (Dominic Monaghan) and Mr. Eko (Adewale Akinnuoye-Agbaje) to help build his S.O.S. sign, but the two men respond they are too busy building a church. Bernard, incredulous at the seemingly cavalier attitude the survivors have towards their rescue, storms off.

Later, Bernard tells a diminished group a newfangled plan to bring rocks from a field for the S.O.S. Hurley and Jin express skepticism for Bernard's planning skills. Bernard encounters more apathy when he tries to enlist Sawyer's help, and reveals to Rose his group had diminished to four. Bernard and Rose argue, as Rose suggests his managing skills aren't up to par. Later, Bernard and Jin engage in an argument over the placement of the rocks. Jin is visibly fatigued from the labor, and walks away. Bernard calls out, telling him he wants to get Rose home, but Jin simply apologizes and walks away.

Rose derides Bernard's plan to Locke, but Locke is more sympathetic. Locke tells her that he's "done with the hatch", but Rose is skeptical. Locke tells her that Jack diagnosed a four-week period of healing, but Rose says "you and I both know it's not going to take that long". This is in reference to the airport flashback, revealing that Rose knows Locke was in a wheelchair before the plane crash.

Bernard continues to work on the S.O.S. alone. Rose brings him some supper and offers him an apology for lying about being healed by Isaac. Rose says that she was nevertheless healed because after the crash, she "couldn't feel" the illness inside of her anymore. She tells him that the island healed her, and tells him with absolute certainty that she knows who or what healed her. Bernard realizes that Rose doesn't want to be rescued from fear of regaining the illness away from the island. Upon his revelation, he tells Rose that he won't leave the island or try to continue the sign.

=== In the hatch ===
Meanwhile, John Locke (Terry O'Quinn) attempts to remember and to draw the writing he saw on the blast doors in "Lockdown", but to no avail. Jack Shephard (Matthew Fox) enters the armory to change Henry Gale's (Michael Emerson) bandages and to interrogate him. Jack tells Henry that he plans to cross the line of the Others and tell them that Henry is a captive. Jack suggests Henry could be used in a trade for Walt Lloyd (Malcolm David Kelley), but Henry replies "They'll never give you Walt".

Ana Lucia Cortez (Michelle Rodriguez) offers to accompany Jack in his attempt to negotiate with the Others. Ana gives Jack a gun and advises him to take someone with him. Locke tries to speak to Henry through the armory door, asking him whether or not he entered the numbers into the computer. However, Henry doesn't respond, only smirking to himself.

=== Out in the jungle ===
Jack and Kate trek through the jungle. Kate notices a doll on the ground and reaches to pick it up, despite Jack's frantic cries to stop. Kate picks up the doll, and both she and Jack become ensnared in a net. They determine the trap is Danielle Rousseau's (Mira Furlan) due to its lower level of sophistication and attempt to free themselves. Kate reaches around Jack to get the gun, and they try to shoot the rope, suspending them in the air. Jack succeeds. Now free, Jack and Kate continue to march through the jungle through the heavy rain. Jack asks Kate to explain her earlier comment about the lack of sophistication of the net. Kate tells him about her expedition with Claire to the other hatch.

Jack and Kate arrive at the place where his standoff with the Others occurred. He calls out into the jungle, challenging them to show themselves. He becomes increasingly animated as he calls for the Others but receives no response.

In the jungle, Kate apologizes for kissing Jack, but Jack reveals that he is not sorry about the moment. A man comes stumbling out of the jungle carrying a torch. He falls to the ground in front of the two and is turned over, revealing him to be an unconscious Michael Dawson (Harold Perrineau).

== Development ==
In the initial plans for the series, Jack was going to die midway through the first episode, and then Kate would emerge as the leader of the survivors. Kate's backstory was that her husband went to the bathroom shortly before the plane split in mid-air, and on the Island she would remain adamant that he was alive. However the producers quickly changed their minds about Jack's death, making him the leader and creating a new backstory for Kate. They liked Kate's original backstory though, so they used it for Rose, and created Bernard as her husband. L. Scott Caldwell's husband was going through health problems during the shooting of the first season, which was the inspiration for the flashbacks in "S.O.S.".

The couple's backstory was originally planned to be told during season three; however during season two, the Lost writers wanted to tell the story of one of the background characters of the show. As Rose and Bernard are the most prominent of these characters, and fans were keen to learn their backstory, they decided to do an episode focussing on the couple. Following this episode, Caldwell did not think Rose's healing had anything to do with the Island and stated "If she is cured, it's because she's willed it herself". After "S.O.S.", Rose does not appear again until midway through the third season. The writers cited Caldwell and Sam Anderson's other projects as a reason for their absence.

== Reception ==
The episode's premiere gained 15.68 million American viewers. C. K. Sample III, of AOL's TV Squad, liked "S.O.S." because it showed "two characters' back stories which we've all been longing to see", comparing their relationship to that of Jack and Kate (Evangeline Lilly), and finding Rose's meeting with Isaac "particularly interesting". Lost producer Leonard Dick called Rose and Bernard "much-beloved characters", and thought they did an "excellent job" in "S.O.S.".
