= Stephen Williams (director) =

Canadian film director

- Born: Canada
- Occupation: Film director
- Years active: 1993–present

Stephen Williams is a Canadian film and television director. Williams has directed several modern-day television programs including work as a regular director on the ABC drama series Lost, for which he was also a co-executive producer.

== Career ==
In 1995, Williams wrote and directed the film Soul Survivor, which starred his brother Peter in the main role. In 2004, he began directing on the ABC drama series Lost, and later also rose to the position of co-executive producer.

== Personal life ==
Williams is married to Jocelyn Snowdon and the couple has a daughter together, also in addition to Stephen's twin sons, Gabriel and Justis. The couple now resides in the Los Angeles area. His brother is actor Peter Williams, best known for playing the Goa'uld Apophis on Stargate SG-1.

== Filmography ==
=== Producer ===
Year(s)	TV series	Season(s)	Role
2005–2009	Lost	2	Producer
2005–2009	Lost	3	Supervising Producer
2005–2009	Lost	4–5	Co-Executive Producer
2008–2009	Atom TV	1	Media Producer
2010	Undercovers	1	Co-Executive Producer
2013	Zero Hour	1	Co-Executive Producer
2019	Watchmen	1	Co-Executive Producer
2021	True Series	1	Executive Producer
2023	Saint X	1	Executive Producer

=== Director ===
==== Film ====
- Soul Survivor (1995); also screenwriter
- Shadow Zone: My Teacher Ate My Homework (1997)
- Milgaard (1999)
- Chevalier (2022)

==== Television ====
Year	TV series	Season	Episode title	Episode	Original airdate
1993	Exploring Ontario's Provincial Parks	Miniseries	Unknown	Unknown	Unknown
1995	Madison	3	"House of Cards"	12	Unknown
1995	Liberty Street	2	"Crimes and Misdemeanours"	2	November 29, 1995
1996	Traders	3	"Independence Days"	11	Unknown
1996	Space Cases	2	"Truth Hurts"	5	November 9, 1996
1996	Flash Forward	1	"Love Letters"	16	Unknown
1997	Psi Factor: Chronicles of the Paranormal	2	"Man of War"	9	November 24, 1997
1998	Psi Factor: Chronicles of the Paranormal	2	"Bad Dreams"	13	February 9, 1998
1998	Earth: Final Conflict	1	"Wrath of Achilles"	16	February 23, 1998
1998	Earth: Final Conflict	1	"The Devil You Know"	17	April 13, 1998
1998	Psi Factor: Chronicles of the Paranormal	3	"Heartland"	3	October 11, 1998
1999	Psi Factor: Chronicles of the Paranormal	3	"Forever and a Day (Part 2)"	22	May 23, 1999
1999	Psi Factor: Chronicles of the Paranormal	4	"Shocking"	1	September 26, 1999
1999	Psi Factor: Chronicles of the Paranormal	4	"Sacrifices"	2	October 3, 1999
1999	The City	1	"Haunted"	5	Unknown
1999	The City	1	"Deranged Marriages"	12	May 11, 1999
1999	The City	1	"It's Cold Out There"	13	Unknown
2001	Soul Food	1	"Sometimes You Win, Sometimes You Lose"	17	January 3, 2001
2001	Blue Murder	1	"Heroes (Part 1)"	1	January 10, 2001
2001	Blue Murder	1	"Heroes (Part 2)"	2	January 10, 2001
2001	Blue Murder	1	"Summer Of Love"	5	January 31, 2001
2001	Blue Murder	1	"Remembrance Day (Part 1)"	12	March 26, 2001
2001	Blue Murder	1	"Remembrance Day (Part 2)"	13	April 2, 2001
2002	Dark Angel	2	"Brainiac"	10	January 11, 2002
2002	Dark Angel	2	"Exposure"	16	March 22, 2002
2002	Odyssey 5	1	"Rapture"	7	August 2, 2002
2002	Odyssey 5	1	"Trouble with Harry"	12	September 6, 2002
2003	Odyssey 5	1	"Half-Life"	17	February 5, 2003
2003	Missing	1	"Thin Air"	5	September 6, 2003
2003	Ed	4	"Death, Debt, Dating"	5	October 21, 2003
2003	Playmakers	1	"Tenth of a Second"	10	November 4, 2003
2003	Crossing Jordan	2	"Perfect Storm"	12	January 27, 2003
2003	Crossing Jordan	2	"Pandora's Trunk, Part One"	21	April 28, 2003
2004	Crossing Jordan	3	"Dead or Alive"	5	March 21, 2004
2004	Crossing Jordan	3	"Missing Pieces"	7	April 4, 2004
2004	Crossing Jordan	3	"Dead in the Water"	12	May 23, 2004
2004	Las Vegas	2	"Good Run of Bad Luck"	5	October 11, 2004
2004	Lost	1	"All the Best Cowboys Have Daddy Issues"	11	December 8, 2004
2005	Kevin Hill	1	"Homeland Insecurity"	12	January 5, 2005
2005	Crossing Jordan	4	"Skin and Bone"	16	March 27, 2005
2005	Lost	1	"Do No Harm"	20	April 6, 2005
2005	Lost	2	"Adrift"	2	September 28, 2005
2005	Lost	2	"...And Found"	5	October 19, 2005
2005	Lost	2	"Collision"	8	November 23, 2005
2006	Lost	2	"The Hunting Party"	11	January 18, 2006
2006	Lost	2	"One of Them"	14	February 15, 2006
2006	Lost	2	"Lockdown"	17	March 29, 2006
2006	Lost	2	"Three Minutes"	22	May 17, 2006
2006	Lost	3	"Further Instructions"	3	October 18, 2006
2006	Lost	3	"Every Man for Himself"	4	October 25, 2006
2007	Lost	3	"Not in Portland"	7	February 7, 2007
2007	Lost	3	"Enter 77"	11	March 7, 2007
2007	Lost	3	"Exposé"	14	March 28, 2007
2007	Lost	3	"Catch-22"	17	April 18, 2007
2007	Lost	3	"Greatest Hits"	21	May 16, 2007
2008	Lost	4	"Confirmed Dead"	2	February 7, 2008
2008	Lost	4	"Eggtown"	4	February 21, 2008
2008	Lost	4	"Meet Kevin Johnson"	8	March 20, 2008
2008	Lost	4	"Something Nice Back Home"	10	May 1, 2008
2008	Lost	4	"There's No Place Like Home (Part 1)"	12	May 15, 2008
2009	Lost	5	"Because You Left"	1	January 21, 2009
2009	Lost	5	"The Little Prince"	4	February 4, 2009
2009	Lost	5	"316"	6	February 18, 2009
2009	Lost	5	"Dead Is Dead"	12	April 8, 2009
2009	Lost	5	"Follow the Leader"	15	May 6, 2009
2010	Undercovers	1	"Instructions"	2	September 29, 2010
2010	Undercovers	1	"Xerxes"	6	October 27, 2010
2010	Undercovers	1	"The Reason"	13	—N/a
2011	Prime Suspect	1	"Regrets, I've Had a Few"	5	October 27, 2011
2011	Prime Suspect	1	"Underwater"	8	November 17, 2011
2012	Touch	1	"Safety in Numbers"	3	March 29, 2012
2012	Touch	1	"Lost and Found"	6	April 19, 2012
2012	Transporter: The Series	1	"The General's Daughter"	1	October 11, 2012
2012	Person of Interest	1	"Super"	11	January 12, 2012
2012	Person of Interest	1	"No Good Deed"	22	May 10, 2012
2013	Person of Interest	3	"Reasonable Doubt"	4	October 15, 2013
2013	Zero Hour	1	"Pendulum"	3	February 28, 2013
2013	Zero Hour	1	"Ratchet"	12	August 3, 2013
2013	Zero Hour	1	"Spring"	13	August 3, 2013
2014	Person of Interest	3	"4C"	13	January 14, 2014
2014	Intelligence	1	"Mei Chen Returns"	3	January 20, 2014
2014	Matador	1	"Code Red Card"	4	August 5, 2014
2014	How to Get Away with Murder	1	"Kill Me, Kill Me, Kill Me"	9	November 20, 2014
2014	Ascension	1	"Chapter 1, Part 2"	2	December 15, 2014
2015	The Americans	3	"Do Mail Robots Dream of Electric Sheep?"	9	March 25, 2015
2015	The Walking Dead	6	"Here's Not Here"	4	November 4, 2015
2016	Westworld	1	"Trace Decay"	8	November 20, 2016
2018	Westworld	2	"Vanishing Point"	9	June 17, 2018
2018	Counterpart	1	"Birds of a Feather"	2	January 28, 2018
2018	Counterpart	1	"Shaking The Tree"	5	February 18, 2018
2018	Counterpart	1	"No Man's Land, Part One"	9	March 18, 2018
2019	Watchmen	1	"She Was Killed by Space Junk"	3	November 3, 2019
2019	Watchmen	1	"This Extraordinary Being"	6	November 24, 2019
2021	True Story	1	"Chapter 1: The King of Comedy"	1	November 24, 2021
2021	True Story	1	"Chapter 2: Greek Takeout"	2	November 24, 2021
2021	True Story	1	"Chapter 3: Victory Lap"	3	November 24, 2021
2025	The Last of Us	2	"Feel Her Love"	5	May 11, 2025
2026	Fallout	2	"The Demon in the Snow"	4	January 7, 2026
2026	Fallout	2	"The Handoff"	7	January 27, 2026
2026	Cape Fear	1	"Los ttiempos de Dios son Perfectos"	8	July 17, 2026
2026	Lanterns	1	"OutKast"	3	August 30, 2026
2026	Lanterns	1	”Bad Optics”	5	September 20, 2026
