= Lana Parrilla =

American actress (born 1977)

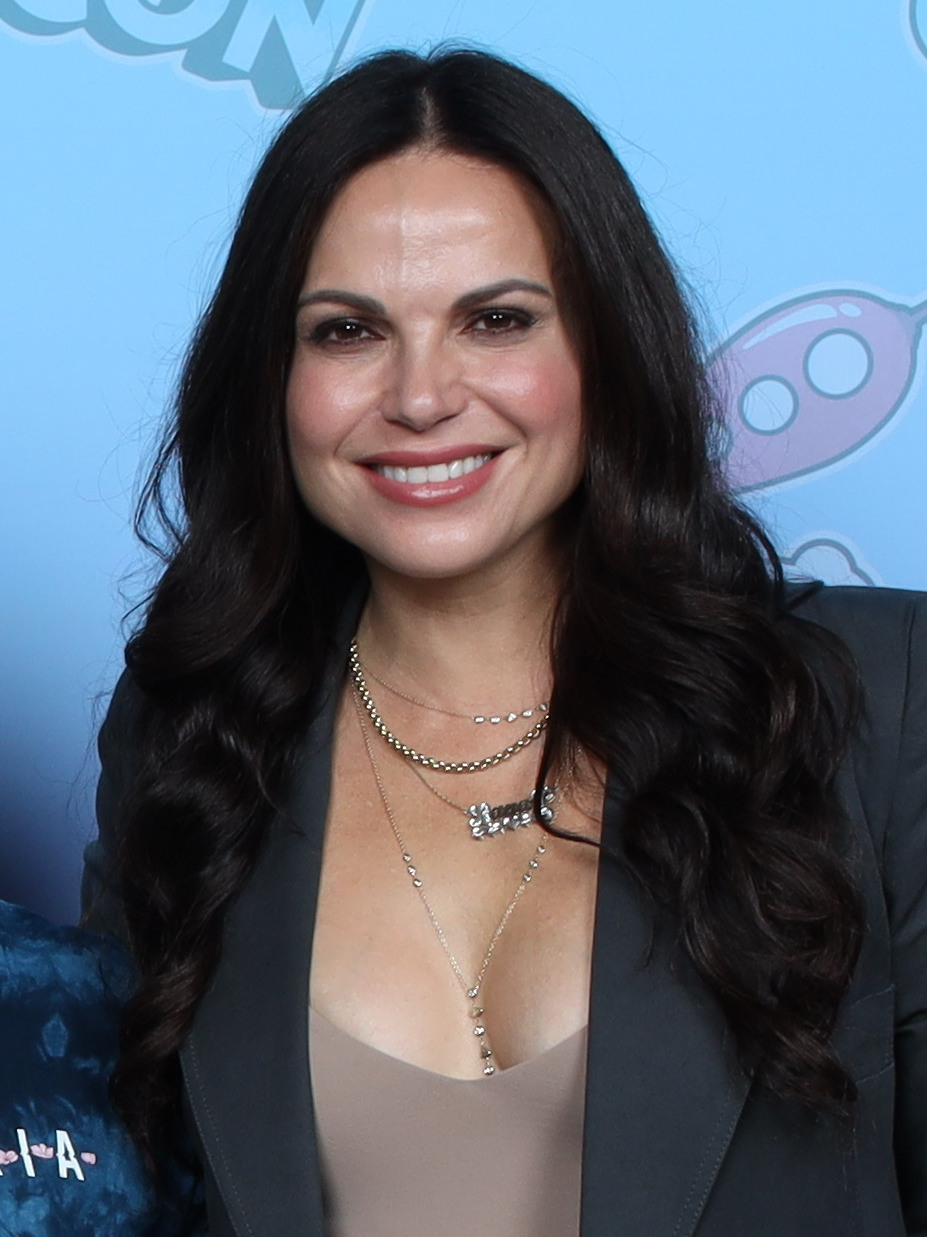
- Parrilla in 2024
- Born: July 15, 1977 (age 49); New York City, U.S.
- Occupations: Actress; director; executive producer
- Years active: 1999–present
- Spouse(s): Alfred Di Blasio (m. 2014; div. by 2019)
- Parents: Sam Parrilla (father); Dolores Dee Azzara (mother)
- Relatives: Candice Azzara (aunt)

Lana Parrilla (born July 15, 1977) is an American actress. She was a regular cast member in the fifth season of the ABC sitcom Spin City (2000–2001) and in the fourth season of 24 (2005), and starred in Boomtown (2002–2003), Windfall (2006), Swingtown (2008), and as Dr. Eva Zambrano in the short-lived medical drama Miami Medical (2010), and as The Evil Queen / Regina Mills in the ABC fantasy drama series Once Upon a Time (2011–2018). Among her awards and nominations is a 2012 ALMA Award win for Outstanding TV Actress—Drama. In 2021, she played the role of Rita Castillo in the second season of Why Women Kill.

== Early life ==
Parrilla was born in the Brooklyn borough of New York City on July 15, 1977. Her mother, Dolores Dee Azzara, is of Sicilian ancestry (Villabate) and her father, Sam Parrilla, is a Puerto Rico-born baseball player who played one season with the Philadelphia Phillies. She is also the niece of Candice Azzara, an American Broadway and TV actress.

She grew up in Boerum Hill and graduated from Fort Hamilton High School in Bay Ridge.

Lana studied acting at the Beverly Hills Playhouse in Los Angeles.

== Career ==
=== 1999–2010 ===
In her early career, Parrilla appeared in several movies, including Very Mean Men (2000), Spiders (2000), and Frozen Stars (2003). She made her television debut in 1999, on the UPN sitcom Grown Ups. In 2000, she joined the cast of the ABC comedy series Spin City, playing Angie Ordonez for one season. She left the show in 2001. After that she joined Donnie Wahlberg and Neal McDonough in the short lived crime drama Boomtown, for which she received the Imagen Award for Best Supporting Actress, for her portrayal of Teresa, a paramedic. Initially a success, Boomtown began to struggle, and Parrilla's character became a police academy rookie, to tie her more closely to the rest of the show. "Boomtown" was canceled just two episodes into its second season.

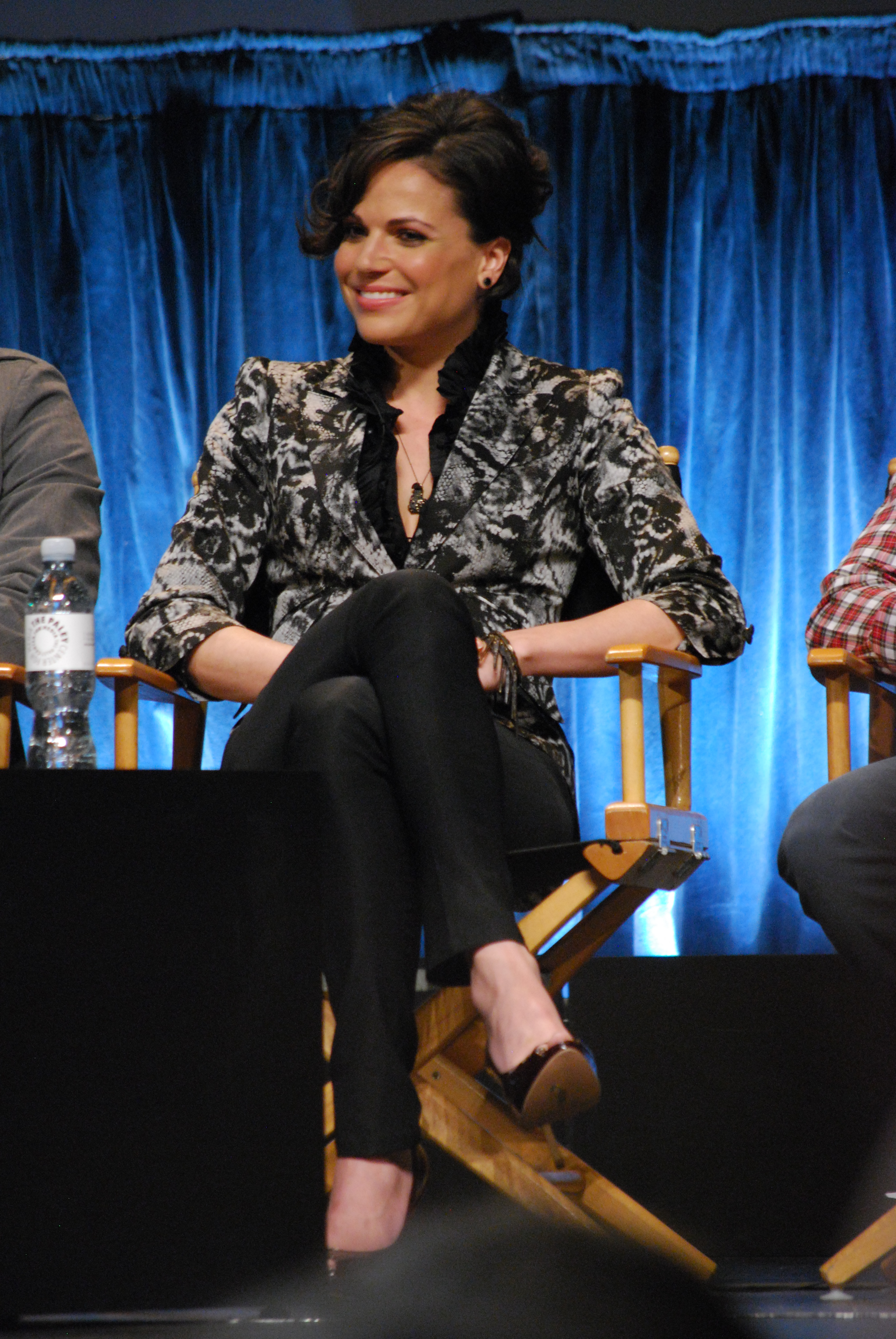
Parrilla in March 2012

Parrilla guest-starred in a number of television dramas, including JAG, Six Feet Under, Covert Affairs, Medium, The Defenders and Chase. She had a recurring role in 2004 as Officer Janet Grafton in NYPD Blue. In 2005, Parrilla took a recurring guest role on the fourth season of the Fox series 24 as Sarah Gavin, a Counter Terrorist Unit agent; she was made a regular cast member in the seventh episode, and her character was written out after the twelfth episode.

In 2006, Parrilla starred in the NBC summer series Windfall alongside former Boomtown castmate Jason Gedrick. In 2007, she guest starred as Greta during the third season of ABC's Lost in the episodes "Greatest Hits" and "Through the Looking Glass" In 2008, she had a leading role in the Lifetime film The Double Life of Eleanor Kendall, in which she played Nellie, a divorcee whose identity has been stolen. Also in 2008, she starred in the CBS summer series Swingtown as Trina Decker, a woman who is part of a swinging couple. In 2010, Parrilla had a female lead role in the Jerry Bruckheimer-produced Miami Medical on CBS, which had a short run towards the end of the 2009–10 television season before it was canceled in July 2010. Windfall, Swingtown and Miami Medical were all canceled after 13 episodes.

=== 2011–present ===
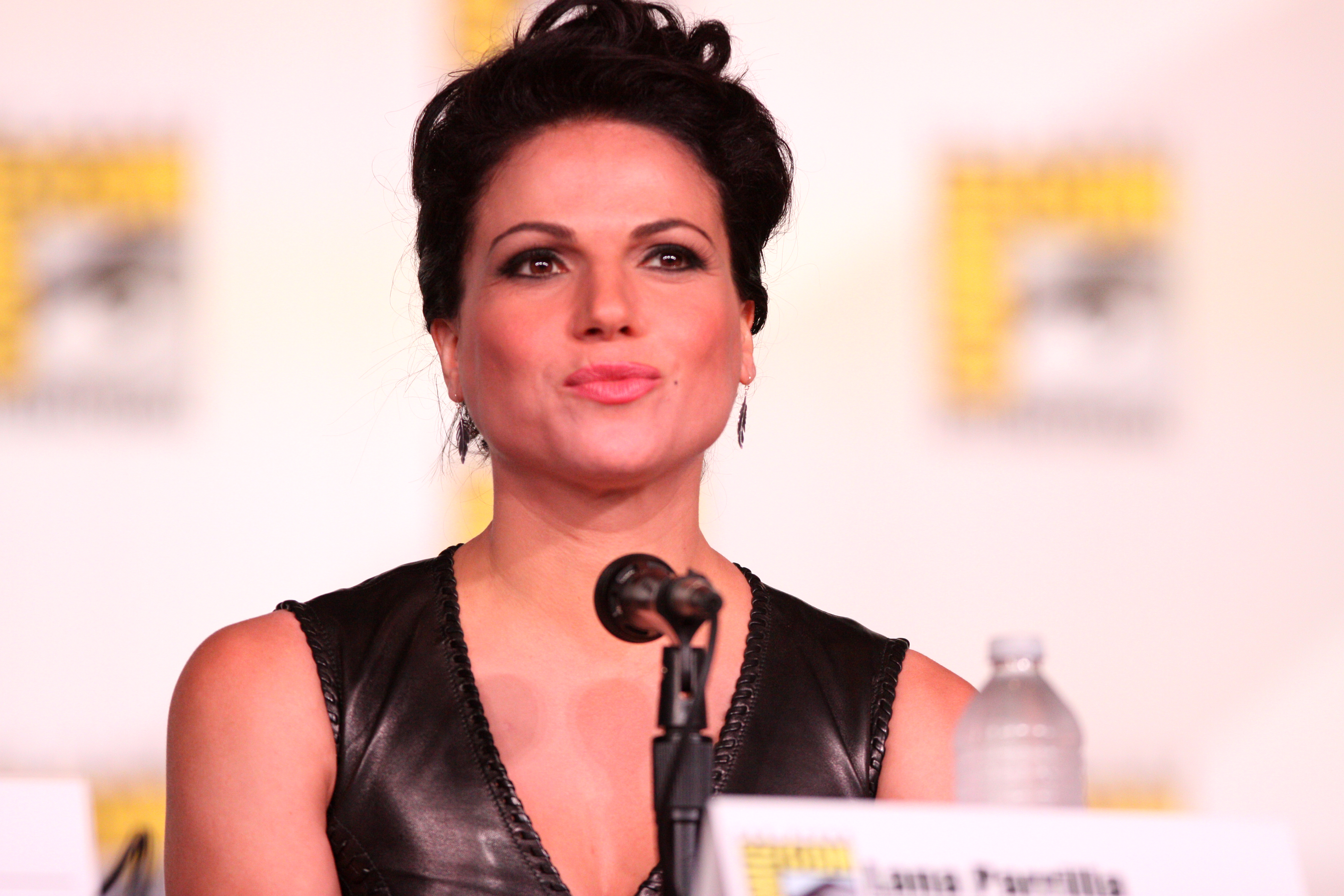
Parrilla in 2012

In February 2011, she was cast as Mayor Regina Mills/The Evil Queen, in the ABC adventure fantasy drama Once Upon a Time, created by Edward Kitsis and Adam Horowitz. The series debuted in October 2011. The pilot episode was watched by 12.93 million viewers and achieved an adult 18–49 rating/share of 4.0/10 during the first season, receiving generally favorable reviews from critics. Parrilla's performance also received positive reviews from critics. In 2012 and 2013, she was regarded as a promising contender for an Emmy Award in the Outstanding Supporting Actress in a Drama Series category, though she did not receive a nomination. She won the TV Guide Award for Favorite Villain and the ALMA Award for Outstanding Actress in a Drama Series in 2012. Parrilla also received a nomination for Best Supporting Actress on Television from the 38th Saturn Awards.

On April 30, 2021, Parrilla released a song with Leonardo Abbate, who goes by the stage name Glovibes, called "It's Over Now". It is a remix and rearrangement of Deborah Cox's 1998 song of the same name.

In 2022, Parrilla was cast opposite Jennifer Lopez in the Netflix sci-fi thriller film Atlas. Later that year, she was cast for the second season of Netflix legal drama series The Lincoln Lawyer.

== Personal life ==
Parrilla became engaged to Alfredo Di Blasio on April 28, 2013, while traveling in Israel. They were married on July 5, 2014, in British Columbia. In April 2019, Parrilla announced on her Instagram account that she was "no longer married" and starting a "new life path".

In 2020, Parrilla launched an online clothing company called Keep It Regal, where she sells apparel inspired by her role in Once Upon a Time.

== Filmography ==
Key
†	Denotes films that have not yet been released

=== Film ===
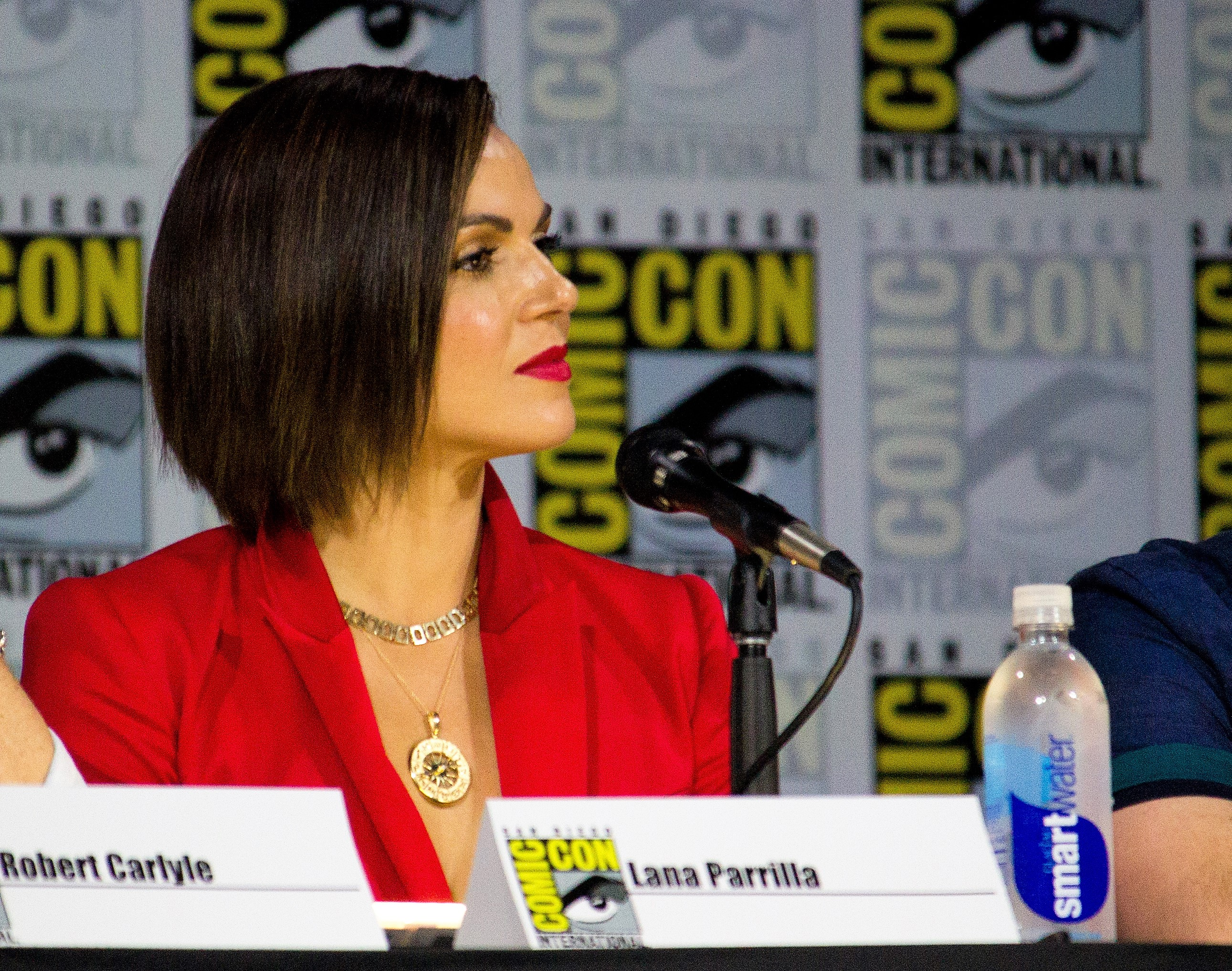
Parrilla at San Diego Comic-Con in 2017

Year	Title	Role	Notes
2000	Spiders	Marci Eyre	
2000	Very Mean Men	Teresa	
2001	Semper Fi	Female Series Commander	
2003	Frozen Stars	Lisa Vasquez	
2005	One Last Ride	Antoinette	
2008	Mistaken / The Double Life of Eleanor Kendall	Eleanor Kendall/Nellie	
2020	The Tax Collector	Favi	
2022	Split at the Root		Documentary film; also executive producer
2022	Scrap	Stacy	
2024	Atlas	Val Shepherd	
TBA	Bad Day at the Office †		Post-production

=== Television ===
Year	Title	Role	Notes
1999	Grown Ups	Waitress	Episodes: "Truth Be Told", "J Says"
2000	Rude Awakening	Nurse Lorna	Episode: "Telltale Heart pt.1"
2000–2001	Spin City	Angie Ordonez	Series regular, 21 episodes
2002	JAG	Lt. Stephanie Donato	Episode: "Head to Toe"
2002	The Shield	Sedona Tellez	Episode: "Circles"
2002–2003	Boomtown	Teresa Ortiz	Imagen Award for Best Supporting Actress
2004	NYPD Blue	Officer Janet Grafton	Recurring role, 3 episodes
2004	Six Feet Under	Maile	Episodes: "Terror Starts at Home", "The Dare"
2005	24	Sarah Gavin	Recurring guest role / Series regular, 12 episodes
2006	Windfall	Nina Schaefer	Series regular, 13 episodes
2006	Lost	Greta	Episodes: "Greatest Hits", "Through the Looking Glass"
2008	Swingtown	Trina Decker	Series regular, 13 episodes
2010	Miami Medical	Dr. Eva Zambrano	Series regular, 13 episodes
2010	Covert Affairs	Julia Suarez	Episode: "South Bound Suarez"
2010	Medium	Lydia Halstrom	Episode: "The Match Game"
2010	The Defenders	Betty Johnson	Episode: "Las Vegas vs. Johnson"
2011	Chase	Isabella Cordova	Episode: "Narco: Part 1"
2011–2018	Once Upon a Time	Regina Mills / Evil Queen / Roni	Main role; 156 episodes Teen Choice Award for Choice TV Actress: Sci-Fi/Fantasy; ALMA Award for Outstanding TV Actress - Drama; TV Guide Award for Favorite Villain; Nominated – Teen Choice Award for Choice TV Villain; Nominated – Teen Choice Award for Choice TV Villain; Nominated – Saturn Award for Best Supporting Actress on Television; Nominated – TV Guide Award for Favorite Villain; Nominated – Teen Choice Award for Choice TV Actress: Sci-Fi/Fantasy; Nominated – Teen Choice Award for Choice TV Actress: Sci-Fi/Fantasy
2021	Why Women Kill	Rita Castillo	Main role (season 2); Gracie Award for Best Actress in a Supporting Role – Comedy or Musical
2023, 2026	The Lincoln Lawyer	Lisa Trammell	Recurring role (season 2); Guest role (season 4 – Episode: "October Surprise")
2024	Lesbophilia	Miss Madam	Short film
2025–present	The Rainmaker	Jocelyn "Bruiser" Stone	Main role

== Awards and nominations ==
Year	Award	Nominated work	Result
2003	Imagen Award for Best Supporting Actress	Boomtown	Won
2008	ALMA Award for Outstanding Actress in a Drama Television Series	Swingtown	Nominated
2012	TV Guide Award for Favorite Villain	Once Upon a Time	Won
2012	Saturn Award for Best Supporting Actress on Television	Once Upon a Time	Nominated
2012	Teen Choice Award for Choice TV Villain	Once Upon a Time	Nominated
2012	ALMA Award for Outstanding TV Actress - Drama	Once Upon a Time	Won
2013	NHMC Impact Award	Once Upon a Time	Won
2013	Teen Choice Awards for Choice TV Villain	Once Upon a Time	Nominated
2013	Imagen Foundation Award for Best Actress/Television	Once Upon a Time	Nominated
2016	Teen Choice Award for Choice TV Actress: Sci-Fi/Fantasy	Once Upon a Time	Won
2017	Teen Choice Award for Choice TV Actress: Sci-Fi/Fantasy	Once Upon a Time	Nominated
2018	Teen Choice Award for Choice TV Actress: Sci-Fi/Fantasy	Once Upon a Time	Nominated
