= Proposals (play) =

Play

Proposals is a comedy-drama by Neil Simon, his 30th play. After running in Los Angeles and the Kennedy Center in 1997, the play opened on Broadway in 1997.

== Productions ==
Proposals had its world premiere at the Ahmanson Theatre in Los Angeles, followed by a run at the Kennedy Center in Washington, DC in October 1997.

The play opened on Broadway at the Broadhurst Theatre on November 6, 1997 and closed on January 11, 1998 after 76 performances and 11 previews. Directed by Joe Mantello, the cast included Kelly Bishop, Suzanne Cryer Katie Finneran, Dick Latessa, Peter Rini as Vinnie and L. Scott Caldwell as Clemma. The sets were by John Lee Beatty, costumes by Jane Greenwood, lighting by Brian MacDevitt and incidental music by Stephen Flaherty.

Proposals had "one of the shortest runs ever for a Neil Simon play on Broadway. Only Fools (1981) had a shorter run, with 40 performances."

== Plot overview ==
A nostalgic memory play, Proposals recalls one idyllic afternoon in the summer of 1953, the last time the Hines family gathers at its retreat in the Poconos. Clemma, the family's African-American housekeeper (and the story's narrator), dreads a visit from the husband who deserted her years before. Burt Hines, a recovering workaholic convalescing from a second heart attack, looks forward to the arrival of the ex-wife he still loves. Burt's daughter Josie has just broken her engagement to Ken, an intense Harvard law student, and she yearns for his buddy Ray, an aspiring writer with whom she had a brief affair. Ray shows up with a striking but dim-witted model on his arm, and a young Miami gangster with a gift for malapropisms adds a note of hilarity to the gathering.

== Reception ==
Ben Brantley, in his review for The New York Times wrote: "Mr. Simon has been blessed with an unusual facility for zippy dialogue and innately involving, neatly shaped stories, but a rich sense of character has always come less easily to him....With Proposals, unfortunately, there's little sense that the people on the stage are more than conduits for the jokes and the plot. Still, how could a playwright with more than two dozen Broadway productions in 30-some years not go on automatic pilot from time to time?"
