= Dave (Lost) =

- Lost episode
- Dave tries to convince Hurley to jump off a cliff.
- Episode no.: Season 2 Episode 18
- Directed by: Jack Bender
- Written by: Edward Kitsis; Adam Horowitz
- Production code: 218
- Original air date: April 5, 2006
- Running time: 47 minutes

Guest appearances
- Evan Handler as Dave; Bruce Davison as Dr. Douglas Brooks; Michael Emerson as Henry Gale; Ron Bottitta as Leonard Simms; Grisel Toledo as Nurse Susie Lazenby

Episode chronology
← Previous "Lockdown"	Next → "S.O.S."
- Lost season 2

"Dave" is the 43rd episode of Lost and the 18th episode of the second season. The episode was directed by Jack Bender, and written by Edward Kitsis and Adam Horowitz. It first aired on April 5, 2006, on ABC. In flashbacks, Hugo "Hurley" Reyes is in a mental institution, where he deals with an imaginary friend, Dave. Libby also has a brief flashback in this episode, revealing that she attended the institution along with Hurley. The island events in the present day have Hurley seeing Dave on the island, while other survivors confront "Henry Gale" (Michael Emerson) after his stated backstory is revealed to be false.

The episode addresses a fan theory which considered the events of the series to be hallucinations or dreams. The character of Dave was written as both a side of Hurley who denied his problems and an analogue to Hurley's disappeared father, and his scenes were filmed so that his reveal as imaginary would be a plot twist.

== Plot ==
=== Flashback ===
Hurley (Jorge Garcia) is in a mental institution, where he is friends with Dave (Evan Handler), who tells Hurley to ignore the doctors, avoid his medication, and try to escape. One day, Hurley's doctor, Dr. Brooks (Bruce Davison), proves to Hurley that Dave is not real, by taking a photo of the two, and then showing Hurley that Dave is not in the picture. Later that night, Dave wakes Hurley up to escape with him from the institute, suggesting that the photo was doctored. Dave hops out of a window, but Hurley confronts him and declares that Dave is not real, and shuts the window on him before going back to bed.

A later flashback reveals that during the moment Dr. Brooks took the picture of Hurley and Dave, another patient was staring at Hurley from across the room, Libby (Cynthia Watros), which explains why Hurley has had this faint recognition of Libby while on the island.

=== On the island ===
Hurley confesses to Libby that he has an eating disorder, and shows her a stash of Dharma food. Hurley expresses interest in getting rid of it, and she encourages him to do so. Just after Hurley destroys his supplies, other survivors go into the jungle. Following them, Hurley and Libby see that an enormous package of food parachuted from the sky. After Hurley panics at the suggestion of again being in charge of the supplies, he sees Dave, and tries to follow him as he goes into the jungle.

After Hurley loses Dave's trail twice, he asks Sawyer (Josh Holloway) for medicine to fight the hallucinations he believes he's been having. After mocking Hurley, Sawyer is brutally attacked by him and his tent ruined. Hurley decides to leave the beach and go to the caves. On the way, Dave reappears, and tells Hurley that everything that has happened since the night of the escape attempt has been a fantasy — that after Dave escaped, Hurley went into a catatonic state and has imagined everything since then. As proof, Dave points out the appearances of the numbers said by another intern, Leonard (Ron Bottitta) in both Hurley's winning lottery ticket and the hatch computer number-sequence. Dave takes Hurley to a cliff, and tells him to jump and get out of his dream, before jumping off himself. Before Hurley can decide whether or not to follow Dave, Libby finds him. Hurley states to her he believes everything happening is not real, and is only a comatose dream, including her, but Libby convinces him otherwise, in part by kissing him.

In the hatch, Sayid (Naveen Andrews) and Ana-Lucía (Michelle Rodriguez) interrogate "Henry Gale" (Michael Emerson). After Henry's new cover-up story is proved false, Henry finally admits that he is indeed an Other, but says he would be killed if he talks. Later, Locke (Terry O'Quinn) confronts the prisoner, demanding to know if he let himself be caught, thinking it might have been to find the Swan. "Henry", however, calls the hatch a "joke", saying that during the lockdown, he never entered the numbers into the computer or pushed the button; he simply stood there, and watched the timer's numbers turn to red hieroglyphs before they reset back on their own. Locke, however, replies that Henry is lying, but he replies that he's "done lying".

== Production ==
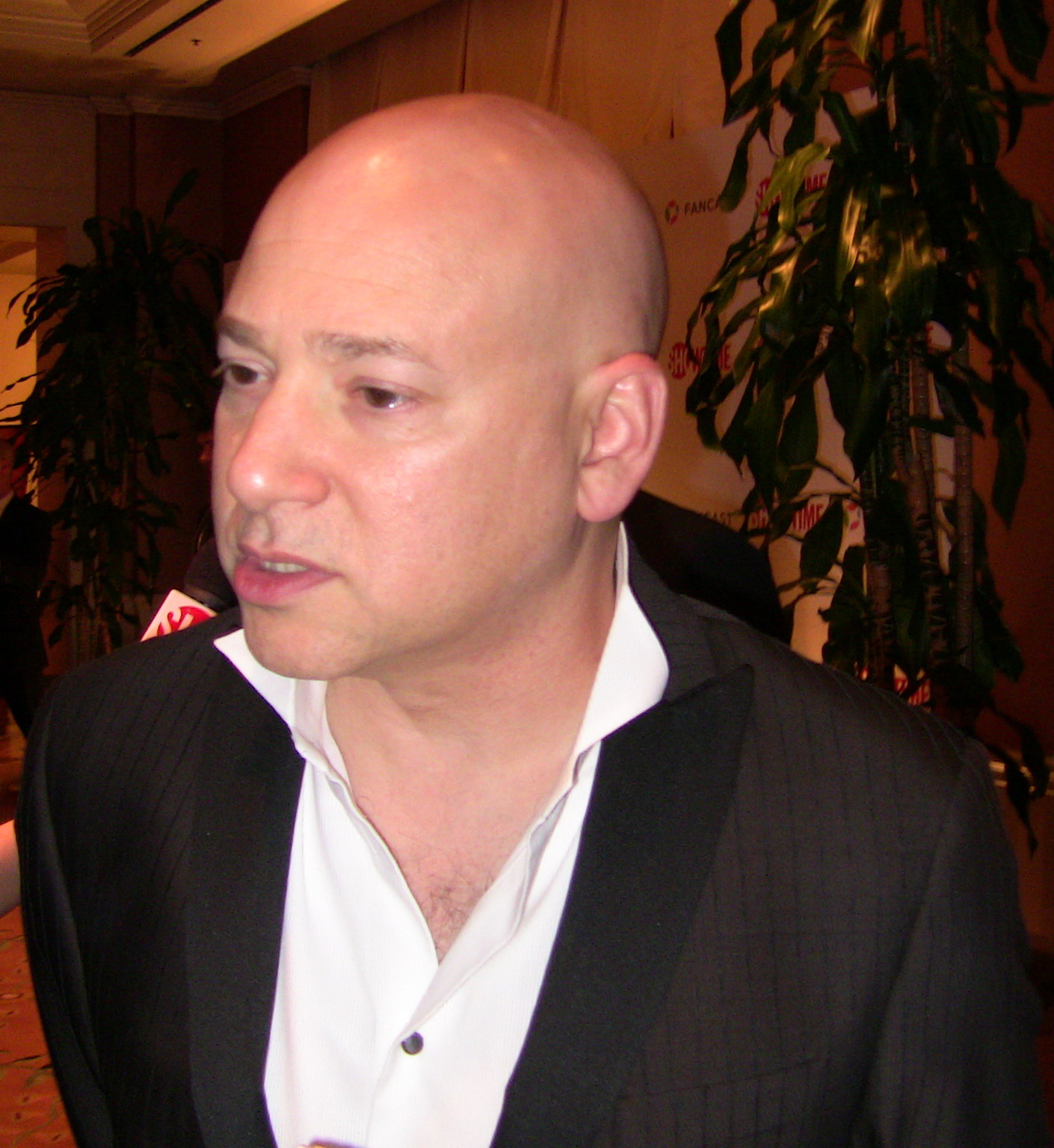
Evan Handler played Dave in this episode.

ABC was concerned about the content of the episode, arguing that the idea that the story could be all in Hurley's head was offering an explanation for the show as a whole, since a recurring theory among the fandom was that the events of the series were hallucinations. The character of Dave was meant to be a side of Hurley who felt he had no problem, and encourages Hurley to overeat, and is played by Evan Handler in a way director Jack Bender described as "mischievous, impish-like". Showrunner Carlton Cuse revealed his name comes from Hurley's father, David Reyes - who would later appear in the series played by Cheech Marin - because the writers "wanted Hurley to imagine a friend and have that be wrapped up in his unresolved relationship with his dad". The final scene with Libby was so secret that only Jack Bender and his assistant director had it in their scripts, and to prevent Libby from being the only woman in the mental institution, every woman on the set, including Bender's daughter Sophie, was dressed in robes and pajamas to appear as background characters.

Director Bender decided to depict Dave in a way audiences would first believe him to be real, but without the character actually interacting with the physical world, similar to films such as The Sixth Sense and A Beautiful Mind. For the scene in which Dave walks through the jungle with Hurley, red and orange flowers were placed to add some "magic" to the scene, something Bender described as a "'Hurley in Wonderland' feel". The scene in which Hurley attacks Sawyer was intended to be a humorous moment, with Bender suggesting that the tent be knocked over, and Josh Holloway adding Sawyer trying to escape but being pulled back.

The scene in which Dave starts listing to Hurley why the island events are occurring in his mind suffered from continuous interruption, as military exercises on Joint Base Pearl Harbor–Hickam led to many takes being ruined by plane noises. Weather problems also plagued production, with loud waves causing Hurley's and Libby's beach scene to be redubbed in post-production, and rain on one day changing the location of the basketball game scene to an indoor court, and also leading to a second day of filming on the cliff. The cliff was digitally redesigned in post-production to appear as if the actors were standing on the edge. Dave's jump was done by making a stunt double jump in front of a bluescreen, with the body hitting the water and resulting splash being rendered through computer graphics. The mental hospital was shot at the Laniakea YWCA in Honolulu, except for Dr. Brooks's office, which was done inside a studio.

== Reception ==
16.38 million American viewers tuned into this episode. Reviews were mixed. Scott Brown of Entertainment Weekly praised Jorge Garcia's and Michael Emerson's performances, and said that the episode made the island "feel dangerous again". Ryan J. Budke of TV Squad felt that the B-story in the hatch was more interesting than Hurley's scenes, and considered "Dave" depressing, in opposition to the other "so light-hearted" Hurley-centered episodes. IGN's Chris Carabott gave the episode a 7 out of 10, considering it entertaining even if it "doesn't really impact the series as a whole," but the website later ranked "Dave" as the 9th worst Lost episode ever, describing it as meaningless and saying the flashback "felt pretty extraneous." New York magazine listed "Dave" sixth in a "Twenty Most Pointless Episodes of Lost" list, considering that "using an episode to disprove a theory that wasn’t so prevalent was a waste of time." On the other hand, the Los Angeles Times ranked the episode as the 30th best of the series, describing it as "perhaps the most misunderstood episode of Lost ever," saying that Dave not being real was meant to be a twist, but just "the biggest expression of just how messed up Hurley was before he found the island."
