= Rose and Bernard Nadler =

Fictional characters from the TV series "Lost"

- Lost characters
- Rose and Bernard encounter the survivors they have been hiding from for three years in the episode "The Incident".
- First appearance: "Pilot: Part 1" (Rose) "Adrift" (Bernard)
- Last appearance: "The End"
- Created by: Jeffrey Lieber; J. J. Abrams; Damon Lindelof
- Portrayed by: L. Scott Caldwell (Rose) and Sam Anderson (Bernard)
- Centric episode(s): "S.O.S."

In-universe information
- Full name: Rose and Bernard Nadler
- Alias: Rose Henderson (birth name)
- Species: Humans
- Gender: Female (Rose); Male (Bernard)
- Occupation: Office Manager (Rose) and Dentist (Bernard)
- Nationality: American
- Former residence: The Bronx, New York

Rose and Bernard Nadler are fictional characters on the American Broadcasting Company (ABC) television series Lost, played by L. Scott Caldwell and Sam Anderson, respectively. Rose and Bernard visit a faith healer on their honeymoon in Australia, in the hope of healing Rose's cancer. When Bernard visits the restroom during the return flight, the plane splits in half, with each half crashing on different parts of an island in the South Pacific. The couple reunite midway through season two, and Rose reveals the Island has healed her. After time traveling in season five, they separate from the remaining survivors and build a cabin near the ocean to live in.

The story of a woman separated from her husband when the plane crashes was going to be used for Kate but, when Kate's role in the series changed, the producers kept that story for Rose. Much of the couple's story prior to the plane crash was based on the events of Caldwell's life; she married her husband even though he was dying. Due to Caldwell and Anderson having other acting commitments, the writers found it difficult finding time when both actors could appear together in the show, resulting in neither character featuring in most of season three. Critics reacted positively to the couple, often hoping they would appear more frequently, and both actors were praised for their work.

== Arc ==
Most of the couple's backstory is told in flashbacks during "S.O.S.". Rose Henderson, an office manager, meets dentist Bernard Nadler when her car becomes stuck in a snowbank one night. After dating for five months, Bernard proposes to her, which prompts Rose to reveal she has cancer that had gone into remission, but has now returned; she only has a year left to live. The two marry regardless, and on their honeymoon in Australia, Bernard takes Rose to a faith healer named Isaac (Wayne Pygram). Despite her initial protests, she agrees to see him. Isaac is unable to heal her, but Rose tells Bernard that he was able to, in order to stop him from wasting any more of the time that they have left together. During a flashback in "Pilot: Part 1", Rose is seated alone across from Jack Shepherd on Oceanic Flight 815, after Bernard leaves to use one of the restrooms, when the plane suddenly hits turbulence. It splits apart in midair, with the fuselage and tail-section landing at opposite ends of an island.

Upon impact, Rose lies unconscious on the beach with the fuselage survivors, but is eventually revived by Jack (Matthew Fox). During the first few days on the Island, Rose is in shock, and keeps herself away from the other survivors, attracting the attention of Jack. While Jack believes that Bernard is dead, Rose is adamant that he is still alive. After Claire (Emilie de Ravin) is kidnapped by the Island's inhabitants (known to the survivors as the Others), Rose comforts Charlie (Dominic Monaghan), who believes it is not his fault and encourages him not to lose hope and prays for him.

During season two, it is shown that Bernard landed with the tail-section survivors on the other side of the Island. After the Others invade their camp, Bernard finds himself as one of the few remaining survivors. They move inland, and discover an abandoned research station, where they find an assortment of items, including a radio. Bernard uses the radio, and makes contact with Boone (Ian Somerhalder), one of the fuselage survivors, but Ana Lucia (Michelle Rodriguez) switches it off, dismissing it as a trick by the Others. After three of the fuselage survivors, Michael (Harold Perrineau), Jin (Daniel Dae Kim) and Sawyer (Josh Holloway) meet the tail-section survivors, they reassure Bernard that Rose is alive and well. They all set off to migrate with the fuselage survivors. Near the fuselage survivors' beach camp, Ana Lucia accidentally kills one of the fuselage survivors, Shannon (Maggie Grace), she refuses to allow anyone to go any further, but they eventually press on without her; Bernard is then reunited with Rose. In "S.O.S.", Bernard concocts a plan to create a giant S.O.S. sign on the beach, but Rose discourages him from spreading false hope among the survivors, and refuses to take part. She confesses that she was not healed in Australia, but has now been healed by the Island, so fears that her illness will return should she leave the Island.

In the twenty-first episode of season three, "Greatest Hits", Jack announces his plan to rig their tents with dynamite to prevent the Others from kidnapping anyone else, so Rose and Bernard assist by tying lengths of wire together. Rose grows concerned when Bernard volunteers to stay behind and detonate the dynamite. She reluctantly allows him to take part, but grows angry at Jack when the plan backfires later that night, and Bernard is captured by the Others. He is soon rescued by Sawyer, Hurley (Jorge Garcia) and Juliet (Elizabeth Mitchell), who kill the Others holding him hostage. Rose watches on as Jack contacts a nearby freighter that he believes has come to rescue them. In the season four premiere "The Beginning of the End", the survivors reunite in the jungle, where Locke (Terry O'Quinn) proposes they hide from the freighter crew, as he believes them to be dangerous. Bernard allows Rose to decide whether to follow Jack or Locke, and she chooses Jack. When the people who arrived from the freighter use morse code to contact the boat, Bernard, who also knows morse code, reveals that they are lying about the message and that there is in fact no one coming to rescue them. Jack falls ill and needs his appendix removed, so Rose and Bernard help with the operation: Rose prepares the table and Bernard helps to knock him out, but Rose is confused to why Jack fell ill when the island normally heals sickness.

After Ben (Michael Emerson), the leader of the Others, causes the Island to move, Rose and Bernard are amongst the survivors who begin to jump to different periods of time, but they eventually lose the others. After three years, Sawyer, Juliet and Kate (Evangeline Lilly) encounter Rose and Bernard, and the couple explains they have built a cabin and retired, purposely avoiding contact with the remaining survivors because they wish to live their remaining days in peace. Later, they rescue Desmond (Henry Ian Cusick) from a well, and are threatened by the Man in Black (Terry O'Quinn). Desmond and the Man in Black reach an agreement and leave Rose and Bernard alone. In season six, the afterlife experienced by the characters is shown, in which Rose is the supervisor at a temp agency while Bernard is once again working as a dentist. In the series finale, Rose and Bernard reunite with the other survivors from the plane in a church, where they prepare to "move on" together.

== Development ==
In the initial plans for the series, Jack was going to die midway through the first episode, and then Kate would emerge as the leader of the survivors. Kate's original backstory was that her husband went to the bathroom shortly before the plane split in mid-air, and on the Island she would remain adamant that he was alive. However the Lost producers changed their minds about Jack's death; they decided he would become the leader and created a new backstory for Kate. They still liked Kate's original backstory, so they used it for Rose. As Rose is black, the producers thought the audience would expect Rose's husband to also be black, and decided to make Bernard a white character to surprise the audience. They expected the audience to assume Mr. Eko (Adewale Akinnuoye-Agbaje), the only black man in the tail-section survivors, was Bernard. L. Scott Caldwell, Rose's portrayer, was unaware of their plans and had been picturing her own husband, a tall black man, when playing the scenes. When she found out Bernard was white, she was surprised, but not shocked. Sam Anderson was unaware of which character he would be playing when he was cast in Lost. During his audition, he performed a scene where a man from the plane crash was informed his daughter was still alive, which he noted covered a similar emotion to the scene in which Bernard is told Rose is still alive. Anderson and Caldwell were given a rough idea of how much they would appear at the start of the seasons.

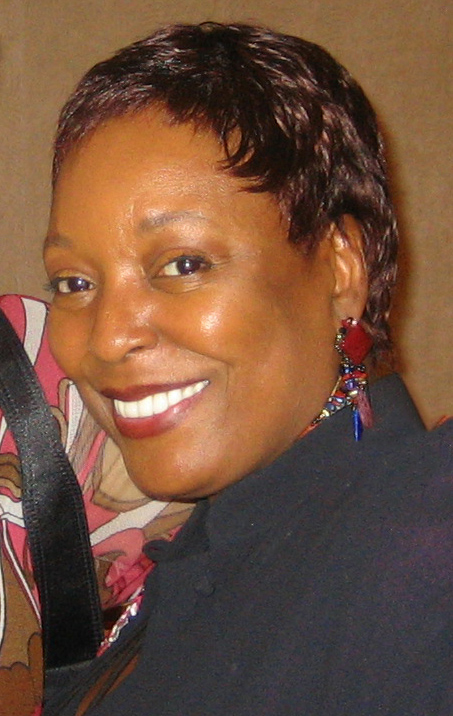
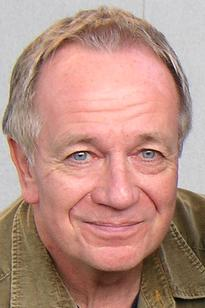
L. Scott Caldwell (left) and Sam Anderson (right) met for the first time while filming their reunion scene in "Collision".

Caldwell and Anderson deliberately did not meet before their reunion scene in "Collision" as they wanted it to be as authentic as possible. In the following episode, Hurley comments that he did not expect Rose's husband to be white, before Jack quickly changes the subject. The producers felt it was important to address that they are an interracial couple, and that Hurley was saying what the audience would be thinking. Caldwell agreed with them and thought it would be odd if the issue was not addressed. Anderson also was glad that Hurley brought up the issue, and liked that Jack did not pay any attention.

The couple's backstory was planned to be told during season three; however during season two, the Lost writers wanted to tell the story of one of the background characters of the show. As Rose and Bernard are the most prominent of these characters, and fans were keen to learn their backstory, they decided to do an episode focusing on the couple. Caldwell's husband was going through health problems during the shooting of the first season, which was the inspiration for Rose's flashbacks in "S.O.S.". Following this episode, Caldwell did not think Rose's healing had anything to do with the Island and stated "If she is cured, it's because she's willed it herself".

Other than reused footage from "Pilot: Part 1" in "Exposé", Rose and Bernard do not feature in season three until the twenty-first episode "Greatest Hits". The writers cited Caldwell and Anderson's other projects as a reason for their absence. Additionally, it was feared that fans would complain if the couple appeared when many actors with star billing had received limited screentime in the early third season. The writers did not want to have the couple on the show to just stand in the background; they wanted to have Rose and Bernard in the show with interesting storylines. Anderson found that although he normally had more fun portraying villains, playing Bernard was "one of the greatest rides of [his] life".

== Reception ==
"If there is one moment that I absolutely love "Everybody Hates Hugo" for its Bernard finally being revealed. Yes, this is a tearjerker and I happily admit that Bernard introducing himself to Michael got to me a little. Rose's confidence in her husband still being alive seemed like wishful thinking, but I'm so glad she was proven right. It's these small victories that continue to give this small group of survivors hope. When this series finally ends, I'll be happy as long as Rose and Bernard are safe and sound."

— IGN's Chris Carabott

Throughout the series, Rose and Bernard have been well received. Chris Carabott from IGN found the conversation where Rose insists Bernard is alive "touching". TV Guide's Matt Roush called Caldwell "terrific", and hoped the producers would use her again in the future. Entertainment Weekly's Michael Slezak was surprised when he discovered Bernard is white, although he was unsure why. Mac Slocum, senior editor of Filmfodder.com, thought it was "super-emotional" when Bernard asked the survivors if Rose was still alive. C. K. Sample III, of AOL's TV Squad, liked "S.O.S." because it showed "two characters' back stories which we've all been longing to see", and noted the couple represent the theme of dichotomy within the show. Lost producer Leonard Dick called Rose and Bernard "much-beloved characters", and thought they did an "excellent job" in "S.O.S.". Jen Chaney from The Washington Post thought it was "touching" and "poignant" that the couple's backstory was based on Caldwell's real life. Noel Murray of The A.V. Club conceded that whilst learning Rose and Bernard's backstory was entertaining, it wasted time and slowed down the pace of the storytelling. Marie Lee-Jenkins of The A.V. Club disagreed with Murray’s conclusion and applauded the writers for taking time to further develop the backstories of two much beloved characters.

Rick Porter from Zap2it was pleased when Rose and Bernard returned in "Greatest Hits". After this reappearance, Patrick Day from the Los Angeles Times hoped they would be featured more often, saying "If they brought these two back ... just to kill them, it will be anti-climactic". Entertainment Weekly's Jeff Jensen called their return a "sight-for-sore-eyes". Maureen Ryan from the Chicago Tribune thought Rose was speaking for the fans when she said "If you say 'live together, die alone' to me, Jack, I'm going to punch you in your face", and hoped Rose and Bernard would feature more often in future episodes. The couple were ranked twelfth in IGN's list of the top fifteen characters from the first three seasons. The critics from IGN also liked Rose's "live together, die alone" line, which they called "both surprising comic relief and the stuff of solid character development; characters like Rose remember and evolve, even if they spend most of their time on the sidelines". The couple were called "the unofficial heart of the show" by the critics, who noted every appearance made by them was a welcome one. Erin Martell from TV Squad thought Rose's role in "Something Nice Back Home" was "awesome", because she asked all the questions fans have been asking.

Variety's Cynthia Littleton "loved seeing Bernard in Grizzly Adams mode" in the season five finale, while Ryan McGee from Zap2it compared Bernard's appearance to both Moses and the Gorton's Fisherman. McGee said "It's a gorgeous, gorgeous scene, even if it stands as a meta-criticism of the angst and turmoil of the show's major characters". Alan Sepinwall from The Star-Ledger called it "one of the best, most moving scenes of the finale". Noel Murray from The A.V. Club thought the scene was useful as it allowed the characters to leave the show, but also it caused him to question whether opting out was the right or wrong thing to do. The Huffington Post's Jay Glatfelter thought their decision not to participate "all but solidified them as the 'Adam and Eve' [skeletons] from the caves", although this was shown not to be the case in season six. Maureen Ryan of the Chicago Tribune listed the pair amongst her favourite characters of the series, commenting "Few things made [her] happier than seeing them comfortably ensconced in their retirement cabin with Walt's dog, Vincent. They had the good sense to give up the whole island rat race, and their optimistic, straightforward attitudes and down-to-earth humor grounded Lost and gave us a window into normalcy, which, goodness knows, we needed sometimes".
