= Lockdown (Lost) =

- Lost episode
- Episode no.: Season 2 Episode 17
- Directed by: Stephen Williams
- Written by: Carlton Cuse; Damon Lindelof
- Cinematography by: Michael Bonvillain
- Editing by: Sarah Boyd
- Production code: 217
- Original air date: March 29, 2006
- Running time: 42 minutes

Guest appearances
- Michael Emerson as Henry Gale; Kevin Tighe as Anthony Cooper; Andrea Gabriel as Nadia Jazeem; Katey Sagal as Helen Norwood; Geoffrey Rivas as Father Chuck; Theo Coumbis as Jimmy Bane

Episode chronology
← Previous "The Whole Truth"	Next → "Dave"
- Lost season 2

"Lockdown" is the 17th episode of the second season of the American drama television series Lost, and the 42nd episode overall. The episode was directed by Stephen Williams, and written by executive producers Carlton Cuse and Damon Lindelof. It first aired on ABC in the United States on March 29, 2006.

The character of John Locke (Terry O'Quinn) is featured in the episode's flashbacks, revealing how he broke up with his romantic partner Helen (Katey Sagal). In the present, the Dharma Initiative station that Locke is in suddenly and inexplicably places itself under lockdown, leaving him and his captive Henry Gale (Michael Emerson) to find a way out and input the numbers before the station's countdown ends. Meanwhile, Jack (Matthew Fox) plays a card game with Sawyer (Josh Holloway) before a large package of food is discovered to have mysteriously dropped on the island.

"Lockdown" was seen by an estimated 16.21 million American household viewers. The episode received positive reviews from critics, with praise given for the plot development and Emerson's performance.

== Plot ==
=== Flashback ===
Locke is preparing to propose to his girlfriend, Helen, at a picnic. However, while he is preparing the lunch, she notices Locke's father's (Kevin Tighe) name in the obituaries, so they postpone the picnic to attend the funeral. No one else is there, except two men standing in the distance. There is also a silver Mercedes with a driver who glares at Locke throughout the funeral far away. At the conclusion of the service, Locke stands next to the coffin and says, "I forgive you."

Later, it is revealed that he has opened his own business inspecting homes. After checking the home of Nadia, he sees the same silver car near his house, and finds that it is his father driving it, who faked his own death to escape from the two men who are trying to kill him because of a "retirement con". He wants Locke to go to the bank to get the money for him from a safety deposit box, and keep $200,000 as payment. After collecting the money, Locke returns home and encounters the two men from the funeral who question him about the validity of his father's death and search his work bag. When Helen asks Locke about the situation, he lies, saying that he has not seen his father. While meeting up with his father at the motel, Locke tells his father that he is planning on marrying Helen. However, when Locke leaves, he sees Helen has followed him, and she is hurt by his lies. She breaks up with Locke, accusing him of choosing his father's love over hers. Locke gets down on one knee and proposes, but Helen shakes her head and drives away, leaving him to stare at his father getting into a taxi cab to leave as well.

=== On the island ===
Henry Gale tries to convince Locke and a suspicious Jack that he was making a bad joke about leading Sayid's (Naveen Andrews) group into a trap. After arguing with Locke about what to do next, Jack storms off, leaving Locke to put Henry back in the armory. Reaching the beach, Jack sees Kate (Evangeline Lilly), Hurley (Jorge Garcia), and Sawyer playing poker with DHARMA Initiative playing cards. After showing that he knows a lot about how to play, he challenges Sawyer to a game to win back the medicine that Sawyer has been hoarding. Jack wins and says he will collect the medicine later.

In the hatch, while pedaling on the stationary bike, Locke hears static noise coming from the speakers throughout the hatch, even though there are still 47 minutes left on the timer. Seconds later, a female voice counts down from ten, and the blast doors begin to shut when she reaches zero, but Locke wedges one open with a crowbar. He then enlists Henry Gale's help to further open the doors, forcing one up a couple of feet and then sliding a toolbox underneath to prop it open. Locke tries to slide through the gap, but the door crushes the toolbox and his legs. One of the metal poles on the underside of the door impales his leg, trapping him under the door. Since the timer is still counting down, Locke tells Henry how to get into the computer room through the vents to input the numbers; Henry agrees to the mission on the condition that Locke will protect him from the other survivors.

While Henry is gone, the timer begins to beep rapidly, signaling the beginning of the one-minute countdown, then the alarm stops, there is a whirring noise (similar to the jet engine-like sound in "One of Them") and the lights go out. Seconds later, blacklights come on and for exactly thirty seconds a diagram is revealed on the blast door that Locke is trapped under. It appears to be a multi-layered map of the island, but it is only shown briefly before the ordinary lights turn back on and the blast doors retract to their normal positions. Henry steps out of the computer room and says that he did what Locke asked him to do.

On the beach, Kate sees a flashing light in the jungle, and when she and Jack investigate, they find an enormous package of food attached to a parachute. They are joined by Sayid, Ana Lucia (Michelle Rodriguez), and Charlie (Dominic Monaghan), who have returned from their expedition.

Entering the hatch, Jack grabs Henry off of the injured Locke, though Locke tries to defend Henry, saying that he was helping him after the blast doors came down. Sayid confirms that they found the balloon and the grave, which were exactly where Henry had said they were. However, Sayid adds that he was still skeptical as to the validity of Henry's story, so he dug up the grave to verify it was his wife's, and found a man's body instead, which held the photo ID of a black man named Henry Gale. This confirms that "Henry" is not who he says he is.

== Reception ==
"Lockdown" first aired in the United States on March 29, 2006. An estimated 16.21 million viewers watched the episode.

Writing in 2009 for IGN, Chris Carabott gave the episode 8.7 out of 10, praising how the episode's events set up the remaining episodes of season two as well as singling out Michael Emerson's "brilliant" performance as Henry Gale. In another IGN article in 2014, Eric Goldman ranked "Lockdown" as 46th out of all the episodes of Lost, mainly commending the twist involving Gale's identity.
