= Lost season 2 =

Season of television series

Lost
- Season 2
- DVD cover
- Showrunners: Damon Lindelof; Carlton Cuse
- Starring: Adewale Akinnuoye-Agbaje; Naveen Andrews; Emilie de Ravin; Matthew Fox; Jorge Garcia; Maggie Grace; Josh Holloway; Malcolm David Kelley; Daniel Dae Kim; Yunjin Kim; Evangeline Lilly; Dominic Monaghan; Terry O'Quinn; Harold Perrineau; Michelle Rodriguez; Cynthia Watros
- No. of episodes: 24

Release
- Original network: ABC
- Original release: September 21, 2005 – May 24, 2006

Season chronology
- ← Previous; Season 1 Next → Season 3

The second season of the American serial drama television series Lost commenced airing in the United States and Canada on September 21, 2005, and concluded on May 24, 2006. The second season continues the stories of a group of over forty people who have been stranded on a remote island in the South Pacific, after their plane crashed forty-four days prior to the beginning of the season. The producers have stated that as the first season is about introducing the survivors, the second season is about a 1970s scientific Dharma Initiative research station which the survivors discovered on the island and refer to as "The Hatch".

The second season aired Wednesdays at 9:00 pm in the United States. In addition to the regular twenty-four episodes (with a run time around 42 minutes each), three clip-shows recapped previous events on the show. "Destination Lost" aired before the premiere, "Lost: Revelation" aired before the tenth episode and "Lost: Reckoning" aired before the twentieth episode. The season was released on DVD as a seven-disc boxed set under the title of Lost: The Complete Second Season – The Extended Experience on September 5, 2006, by Buena Vista Home Entertainment.

== Crew ==
The season was produced by Touchstone Television (now ABC Studios), Bad Robot and Grass Skirt Productions and was aired on the ABC Network in the U.S. The executive producers were co-creator J. J. Abrams, co-creator Damon Lindelof, Bryan Burk, Jack Bender and Carlton Cuse. The staff writers were Lindelof, Cuse, co-executive producer Steven Maeda, supervising producer Javier Grillo-Marxuach, supervising producers Edward Kitsis & Adam Horowitz, supervising producer Leonard Dick, supervising producer Jeph Loeb, supervising producer Craig Wright, producer Elizabeth Sarnoff and Christina M. Kim. The regular directors were Bender, producer Stephen Williams, camera operator Paul Edwards and Eric Laneuville. Lindelof and Cuse served as the showrunners.

== Cast ==
=== Main ===
Characters from left to right: Mr. Eko, Claire, Hurley, Kate, Jin, Ana Lucia, Sayid, Jack, Sawyer, Sun, Charlie, Libby, Michael and Locke

The second season had sixteen roles getting star billing, with thirteen of them returning from the first season. The cast are listed in alphabetical order.

- Adewale Akinnuoye-Agbaje as former drug lord-turned priest, Mr. Eko
- Naveen Andrews as former Iraqi Republican Guard Sayid Jarrah
- Emilie de Ravin as new mother Claire Littleton
- Matthew Fox as Dr. Jack Shephard, the leader of the survivors
- Jorge Garcia as unlucky and mentally unstable millionaire Hugo "Hurley" Reyes, who often serves as comic relief
- Maggie Grace as Shannon Rutherford, still recovering from the recent death of her brother Boone
- Josh Holloway as con man James "Sawyer" Ford
- Malcolm David Kelley as Walt Lloyd, Michael's son; he only receives star billing in the episodes in which he appears
- Daniel Dae Kim as non-English speaking Jin Kwon
- Yunjin Kim as Sun Kwon, Jin's English-speaking wife
- Evangeline Lilly as fugitive Kate Austen
- Dominic Monaghan as rock star and recovering drug addict Charlie Pace
- Terry O'Quinn as "man of faith" John Locke
- Harold Perrineau as Michael Dawson, whose son was kidnapped by the Others
- Michelle Rodriguez as the leader of the tail section survivors, police officer Ana-Lucia Cortez
- Cynthia Watros as tail-section survivor Libby

=== Special guest star ===
- Ian Somerhalder as Boone Carlyle

=== Recurring ===
- Michael Emerson as a man calling himself Henry Gale, who is suspected to be one of the Others, a group of mysterious island inhabitants who terrorize the survivors
- L. Scott Caldwell as Rose Henderson
- Sam Anderson as Bernard Nadler, Rose's husband
- Kimberley Joseph as flight attendant Cindy, having appeared in the pilot episode
- Henry Ian Cusick as Desmond Hume, a man who had been living in the hatch for three years
- Mira Furlan as Danielle Rousseau, the only surviving member of a team of scientists who arrived on a ship to the island sixteen years ago
- M. C. Gainey as the Other named Tom
- Tania Raymonde as the Other named Alex
- John Terry as Christian Shephard, Jack's father who appears in flashbacks
- François Chau as the scientist who appears in orientation films for the Dharma Initiative
- Clancy Brown as Desmond's companion in the hatch, Kelvin Inman
- Katey Sagal as Helen, Locke's love interest who gets caught between his pugnacious relationship with his father

== Reception ==
On Rotten Tomatoes, the season has an approval rating of 100% with an average score of 9.2/10 based on 12 reviews. The website's critical consensus reads, "This sophomore season goes smoothly down the hatch, deepening both the mysteries of the island and the depth of its castaways."

The season was nominated for nine Emmy Awards, but did not win any. Nominations included Carlton Cuse and Damon Lindelof for Outstanding Writing for a Drama Series for "The 23rd Psalm"; Jack Bender for Outstanding Directing for a Drama Series for "Live Together, Die Alone"; Henry Ian Cusick for Outstanding Guest Actor in a Drama Series; Michael Bonvillain for Outstanding Cinematography for a Single-Camera Series for "Man of Science, Man of Faith"; two nominations for Outstanding Single-Camera Picture Editing for a Drama Series; Outstanding Casting for a Drama Series; Outstanding Single-Camera Sound Mixing for a Series; and Outstanding Special Visual Effects for a Series.

The season was nominated for three Golden Globe Awards: Matthew Fox for lead actor, Naveen Andrews for supporting actor, while it won the award for best drama.

The DVD set entered the sales chart at the number one position in its first week of release, selling 500,000 copies in the first day. The season premiere hit a ratings high for the series, with 23.47 million American viewers. Overall, the season averaged 18.91 million American viewers.

== Episodes ==
"Featured character(s)" refers to the character(s), whose back story is featured in the episode's flashbacks.

| No. overall | No. in season | Title | Directed by | Written by | Featured character(s) | Original release date | U.S. viewers (millions) |
|---|---|---|---|---|---|---|---|
| 26 | 1 | "Man of Science, Man of Faith" | Jack Bender | Damon Lindelof | Jack | September 21, 2005 | 23.47 |
Jack meets Sarah Wagner (Note: Jack's wife, first seen in "Do No Harm".) after she gets in a car accident and is unable to repair the damage to her spinal cord. He meets Desmond Hume while out for a run, and is later shocked to see Sarah recovering after surgery. In the present, Shannon has a vision of Walt. Inside the hatch, Desmond goes about his daily routine of entering the numbers into a computer before being interrupted by the survivors blowing the door. (Note: As depicted in "Exodus".) Locke and Kate descend into the hatch. Jack goes in after them and discovers Locke being held at gunpoint by Desmond, whom Jack recognizes.
| 27 | 2 | "Adrift" | Stephen Williams | Steven Maeda & Leonard Dick | Michael | September 28, 2005 | 23.17 |
Michael tries to sue Susan Lloyd (Note: Walt's mother and Michael's ex-wife, first seen in "Special".) for custody of Walt, but eventually relents and gives him a stuffed polar bear as a parting gift. In the present, Desmond locks Kate in the pantry. An alarm goes off and Desmond forces Locke to enter the numbers and push the computer's button, causing the 108 minute timer to reset. Jack enters moments later as Kate, having crawled into the air ducts, watches. With Jin missing, Michael and Sawyer argue about the raft's destruction as sharks circle them. Sawyer swims for the raft's pontoon as Michael fends the sharks off. They reconcile as Michael admits that he should not have brought Walt with him and soon wash ashore on the island, where Jin is being chased.
| 28 | 3 | "Orientation" | Jack Bender | Javier Grillo-Marxuach & Craig Wright | Locke | October 5, 2005 | 22.38 |
Locke starts a relationship with Helen Norwood as he stalks Anthony Cooper. (Note: Locke's estranged father who conned him out of a kidney, first seen in "Deus Ex Machina".) After several months, she convinces Locke to move on with her. In the present, the raft group is imprisoned in a pit and Ana Lucia, (Note: First seen in "Exodus" as a stranger Jack meets at the airport bar.) a survivor of Oceanic Flight 815's tail section, questions them. Kate ambushes Desmond and he accidentally shoots the computer. Jack and Locke find an orientation tape from the "DHARMA Initiative" identifying the hatch as the "Swan station", where "Marvin Candle" explains that after an "incident" employees must enter the numbers into the computer once the timer has four minutes left. Jack follows a fleeing Desmond, believing the computer to be a social experiment, and Desmond finally remembers him. He asks what happened to Sarah, and Jack admits that they are now divorced. Sayid fixes the computer and Locke presses Jack to enter the code, which he reluctantly does with one second to spare.
| 29 | 4 | "Everybody Hates Hugo" | Alan Taylor | Edward Kitsis & Adam Horowitz | Hurley | October 12, 2005 | 21.67 |
The day after winning the lottery, (Note: As depicted in "Numbers".) Hurley quits his job and his best friend goes with him to have a fun day together. They go to the gas station where Hurley bought the ticket, where he is recognized as the winner, causing a jealous rift between him and his friend. In the present, an anxious Hurley is tasked with rationing the Swan's food and asks survivor Rose Nadler for help. He decides to blow the pantry up, believing that having control over supplies will make his friends turn on him, but Rose talks him out of it. Instead, he distributes all the food to the survivors at one time in a sort of picnic. The raft group is taken to the DHARMA "Arrow" station where the five remaining "tailies" live. Bernard, Rose's presumed-dead husband, approaches the trio and is stunned to learn that she survived the crash.
| 30 | 5 | "...And Found" | Stephen Williams | Carlton Cuse & Damon Lindelof | Sun & Jin | October 19, 2005 | 21.38 |
Jin's roommate uses the I Ching to predict that he will find "orange" love soon. He gets a job as a hotel doorman while Woo-Jung Paik sets Sun up with Jae-Young Lee, the son of the hotel's owner, whom she takes an interest in but learns that he plans to run away to America. Jin quits after his boss berates him for letting a poor boy in to use the bathroom and turns to look at a woman in an orange dress, causing him to bump into Sun. In the present, the tailies ask the raft trio to take them to the other camp, but Michael runs off into the jungle to find Walt. Jin and pit guard Eko pursue him, finding him and convincing him to come back.
| 31 | 6 | "Abandoned" | Adam Davidson | Elizabeth Sarnoff | Shannon | November 9, 2005 | 20.01 |
Shannon's father, the other person in Sarah's car accident, dies and she is set to inherit some money. She plans to use it to move to New York after winning a dance internship, but her stepmother, believing her to be irresponsible, blocks this. She rejects Boone's money, angry that he does not believe she can make it on her own. In the present, the tailies and raft trio trek across the island, but Sawyer's gunshot wound (Note: Occurred in "Exodus".) worsens and they are forced to make a stretcher for him. Shannon keeps seeing visions of Walt and is upset when Sayid does not believe her. She gives Vincent Walt's scent from his belongings and follows him into the jungle. Sayid follows her and promises he loves her, and they both see Walt. Shannon runs after him, but is shot and killed by an approaching Ana Lucia, who has mistaken her for an Other.
| 32 | 7 | "The Other 48 Days" | Eric Laneuville | Damon Lindelof & Carlton Cuse | Ana Lucia, Bernard, Libby and Mr. Eko | November 16, 2005 | 21.87 |
After the tailies make camp on their beach, Others begin abducting them in the night. Ana Lucia finds a list of tailies on an Other she kills. Suspicious that one of their group is a mole, she digs the pit and imprisons a suspect in it. Survivor Goodwin Stanhope frees him, only to kill him and get rid of his body, framing him as the Other. Ana Lucia notes that Goodwin's clothes were completely dry after the crash, and he admits that he is an Other but says they were only abducting the "good" tailies. She kills him in a struggle. Bernard picks up Boone's distress call, (Note: As depicted in "Deus Ex Machina".) but Ana Lucia dismisses it as an Others trick. Jin washes ashore and is detained for questioning, then flees to the beach where Michael and Sawyer see him.
| 33 | 8 | "Collision" | Stephen Williams | Javier Grillo-Marxuach & Leonard Dick | Ana Lucia | November 23, 2005 | 19.29 |
Ana Lucia returns to her LAPD job after being shot by a criminal, but allows him to walk free after he is arrested. She later informs him that she was pregnant when she was shot and then kills him. In the present, Sayid attacks her and is restrained with the vines from Sawyer's stretcher, forcing Eko to take Sawyer to camp. He encounters Jack, who brings him to the Swan. Ana Lucia agrees to release Sayid if she is brought supplies to survive on her own. Bernard and remaining tailie Libby Smith follow Jin to camp, where Bernard reunites with Rose. Alone and uncertain of what to do with Sayid, Ana Lucia tells him the story of her shooting and lets him go. She leaves herself open for him to exact revenge, but he decides that "we're both already dead" and walks away with Shannon's body. Jack arrives, recognizing her from the airport.
| 34 | 9 | "What Kate Did" | Paul Edwards | Steven Maeda & Craig Wright | Kate | November 30, 2005 | 21.54 |
Kate kills her abusive stepfather, Wayne Janssen, and Diane Janssen (Note: Kate's mother, first seen in "Born to Run".) turns her in. She escapes from Edward Mars when a horse causes a car crash and runs to her father Sam Austen, deducing that Wayne was actually her biological father. She admits that she killed him because she hated her lineage, and Sam gives her a head start before calling the authorities. In the present, Kate sees the horse on the island, and while tending to Sawyer, he briefly wakes and accuses her of killing him. Jack confronts her for shirking her computer duties and they kiss. She returns to Sawyer, who briefly responds to "Wayne" before waking up as himself, and they see the horse together. Locke shows the orientation film to Eko, who gives him some film he found in the Arrow, which pieces together missing frames and reveals that using the Swan's computer improperly could result in another "incident." While on computer duty, Michael gets a message from Walt.
| 35 | 10 | "The 23rd Psalm" | Matt Earl Beesley | Carlton Cuse & Damon Lindelof | Mr. Eko | January 11, 2006 | 20.56 |
In Eko's childhood, guerrillas try to force his brother Yemi to kill a man, but Eko does it for him and is initiated. Eko grows into a fearsome warlord and presses Yemi, now a priest, to ordain him and his men so they can hijack a relief flight and smuggle heroin, which they hide in Virgin Mary statues. Yemi calls the military, who shoot him when he tries to shield Eko. Eko's man takes Yemi and leaves without him, and he is mistaken for a priest by the military. In the present, Eko learns from Claire that Charlie has a statue, (Note: As depicted in "Exodus".) and he shows her the heroin inside. He demands Charlie show him the Beechcraft and they encounter the smoke monster along the way, which Eko stares down. They reach the plane and Eko finds Yemi's body. He gives Charlie another statue before burning the plane. Claire rejects Charlie when he returns, and he hides the statue with others he has collected.
| 36 | 11 | "The Hunting Party" | Stephen Williams | Elizabeth Sarnoff & Christina M. Kim | Jack | January 18, 2006 | 19.13 |
Against Christian Shephard's advice, Jack, bolstered by his success with Sarah, operates on a man with a spinal tumor, who dies during the procedure. His daughter kisses Jack and he admits this to Sarah, who has already planned to leave him and makes it official. In the present, Michael steals guns from the Swan and goes off alone to find Walt. Jack, Locke, and Sawyer go after him and encounter a group of Others led by Tom Friendly, the man who took Walt. He confirms that "this is our island" and reveals that they have Kate, who had followed the trio. The group surrender their weapons for Kate's safety. When they return to the beach, Jack asks Ana Lucia about training an army.
| 37 | 12 | "Fire + Water" | Jack Bender | Edward Kitsis & Adam Horowitz | Charlie | January 25, 2006 | 19.05 |
Liam Pace's (Note: Charlie's heroin addict brother, first seen in "The Moth".) addiction ruins band prospects and his marriage, causing him to sell Charlie's childhood piano and use the money to follow his wife to Australia, leaving Charlie behind. In the present, Sawyer notices Hurley's crush on Libby and successfully pushes him to talk to her. Charlie has nightmares about Aaron Littleton drowning and awakens to find himself standing at the shore with the baby. After a talk with Eko, he believes Aaron needs to be baptized, but Claire refuses to listen to him. Suspicious of his erratic behavior, Locke follows him to his statue stash and confiscates them, putting them in the Swan's armory despite Charlie's insistence that he was going to destroy them. Charlie starts a fire to distract the camp and steals Aaron, but Locke beats him in front of everyone before he can baptize him in the ocean. Later, Claire has Eko properly baptize her and Aaron.
| 38 | 13 | "The Long Con" | Roxann Dawson | Steven Maeda & Leonard Dick | Sawyer | February 8, 2006 | 18.74 |
Cassidy Phillips, a woman Sawyer is seeing, asks him to teach her conning, unaware that he and his partner are conning her. Having developed feelings for her, Sawyer tries to pull out, but his partner threatens Cassidy so he goes through with it. He gets her to flee with a bag of her money, only to give her a fake, taking the real money when she leaves. In the present, Jack takes Sawyer's stolen painkillers to keep in the Swan, so he mentions the army Jack and Ana Lucia are trying to form to Kate. Someone tries to kidnap Sun, and Kate determines it was not the Others, theorizing Ana Lucia did it to sow fear. She relays this to Jack, then asks Sawyer to alert Locke, who asks Sawyer to take over the computer while he hides the guns. While Jack and Locke argue, Sawyer reveals he has found the guns and hidden them for himself. Charlie is revealed to have followed Locke while he hid the guns and attacked Sun, working with Sawyer to humiliate the former.
| 39 | 14 | "One of Them" | Stephen Williams | Damon Lindelof & Carlton Cuse | Sayid | February 15, 2006 | 18.20 |
During the Gulf War, Sayid and his comrades are detained by Sam. DIA agent Kelvin Inman orders him to torture his superior for the location of a captive American pilot, which he does when he learns that the man was indirectly responsible for the death of his family, only to discover that the pilot is already dead. Sayid is released and vows to never torture again. In the present, Danielle Rousseau shows Sayid a captured man she believes is an Other, who identifies himself as Henry Gale. Rousseau injures him, forcing Sayid to take him to the Swan for Jack to treat him. Suspicious of Henry's story that he crashed on the island in a hot air balloon, Sayid has Locke seal them in the armory and tortures Henry, letting his emotion over Shannon overwhelm his reasoning. As the Swan alarm goes off, Jack restrains Locke until he opens the armory. He does, but goes a few seconds over time and the timer displays hieroglyphs before he enters the code, resetting things to normal.
| 40 | 15 | "Maternity Leave" | Jack Bender | Dawn Lambertsen Kelly & Matt Ragghianti | Claire | March 1, 2006 | 16.43 |
Aaron grows sick and Rousseau tells Claire that he is "infected." Libby, a clinical psychologist, helps Claire recall her time being abducted by Ethan Rom, (Note: As depicted in "All the Best Cowboys Have Daddy Issues".) which she remembers while she and Rousseau search for a cure for Aaron. During that time, Ethan takes a docile Claire to the "Staff" station and gives her "vaccinations" for the baby. She sees him being admonished by Tom about his unprepared "list" and she agrees to give Aaron to the Others. A teenage Other forces her outside, insisting they are going to kill her, and she is brought back to camp by Rousseau. In the present, they find that the vaccines are gone. Claire wonders if the girl who saved her was Alex Rousseau, and finds that Aaron is healthy when she returns. Having overheard Jack and Locke arguing, Henry subtly manipulates the latter by questioning his authority.
| 41 | 16 | "The Whole Truth" | Karen Gaviola | Elizabeth Sarnoff & Christina M. Kim | Sun | March 22, 2006 | 16.06 |
While Sun learns English from Lee, she learns she is infertile, devastating Jin. She is relieved, but later learns that Jin is actually the infertile one. In the present, he becomes overprotective of Sun after her attack, while she gets a pregnancy test from Sawyer, which comes back positive. Jin apologizes to Sun for his behavior and she admits she is pregnant, revealing his infertility but promising he is the father. Jin declares it a miracle and tells her he loves her in English. Ana Lucia presses Henry to draw a map to his balloon and buried wife. She takes Sayid to go find it, making amends with him over Shannon along the way. Jack lets Henry eat breakfast with him and Locke, where he implies that he could have sent Ana Lucia into an Others ambush.
| 42 | 17 | "Lockdown" | Stephen Williams | Carlton Cuse & Damon Lindelof | Locke | March 29, 2006 | 16.21 |
Cooper fakes his death to evade men he conned and asks Locke to retrieve some money, but he is interrogated by the men in front of Helen. He promises her that he has not talked to Cooper, but when he meets with Cooper to plan his proposal to her, she sees them together and leaves Locke. In the present, the Swan's blast doors suddenly lower, cutting Locke off from the computer. He frees Henry to help him pry the door open, but it closes on his legs. Henry promises to get to the button through the vents if he is protected from the survivors, and as the timer counts down, a blacklight turns on and illuminates a map of the DHARMA stations drawn on a door. Jack and Kate find a pallet of food in the jungle just as Ana Lucia returns, having found the balloon. Sayid confronts Henry, having dug up his "wife" and instead finding the real Henry Gale.
| 43 | 18 | "Dave" | Jack Bender | Edward Kitsis & Adam Horowitz | Hurley | April 5, 2006 | 16.38 |
At Santa Rosa, Hurley's friend Dave convinces him to eat as much as he can. His doctor gets him to discuss the incident that put him in the facility, in which a deck collapsed and killed two people while he was on it, explaining that Hurley is using Dave to punish himself. He proves this by showing Hurley a picture of the two where only Hurley is visible, leading Hurley to reject Dave's offer to escape. In the present, Hurley confesses his eating disorder to Libby and destroys his food stash at her encouragement, only to panic when he sees the new pallet of food. He starts seeing Dave, who tells him that he lapsed into catatonia and hallucinated the island, and that he needs to jump off a cliff to wake up. Libby finds Hurley and kisses him to convince him he is in reality. Henry admits he is an Other and tells Locke that he never entered the code, and that the timer reset on its own. Another flashback reveals that Libby was also a patient at Santa Rosa.
| 44 | 19 | "S.O.S." | Eric Laneuville | Steven Maeda & Leonard Dick | Rose & Bernard | April 12, 2006 | 15.68 |
Bernard and Rose meet and marry despite Rose's terminal cancer. Bernard takes her to an Australian faith healer who cannot help her, but she asks him to tell Bernard she was healed. In the present, Bernard gathers survivors to build an SOS sign on the beach, though his domineering attitude and Rose's insistence that he is wasting his time deter his helpers. She tells Bernard that she was not healed, but felt her illness vanish after the crash, and that she does not want to leave the island for fear of the cancer returning. He stops making his sign. Locke tries to redraw the door map from memory. Jack and Kate head into the jungle in hopes of trading Henry for Walt. At the spot where they met Tom's group, Michael stumbles out of the brush.
| 45 | 20 | "Two for the Road" | Paul Edwards | Elizabeth Sarnoff & Christina M. Kim | Ana Lucia | May 3, 2006 | 15.56 |
Ana Lucia quits her job and meets Christian, who asks her to accompany him to Australia as a bodyguard. She witnesses him violently pressing a woman to let him see his daughter and disgustedly abandons him. While waiting to board Flight 815, she sees Jack trying to get Christian's body on the plane (Note: As depicted in "White Rabbit".) and calls her mother, promising to reconcile with her when she lands. In the present, Henry tries to kill her when she gets too close. He tells Locke he is "one of the good ones" when asked why he did not kill him during the lockdown. Ana Lucia seduces Sawyer. With Michael having found the Others, Jack and Locke go to get guns from Sawyer, who realizes Ana Lucia stole his pistol. She tries to set up an escape attempt as an excuse to kill Henry, only to admit to Michael that she can no longer do it. He offers to kill him, only to kill her instead and shoot Libby when she enters to get blankets for a picnic with Hurley. He then shoots himself in the arm.
| 46 | 21 | "?" | Deran Sarafian | Damon Lindelof & Carlton Cuse | Mr. Eko | May 10, 2006 | 16.35 |
Working in Australia, Eko is sent to investigate Richard Malkin's (Note: Claire's psychic, first seen in "Raised by Another".) daughter, who died and came back to life. Malkin insists nothing happened and outs himself as a fraud, but before Eko boards Flight 815, the girl approaches him and delivers a message from Yemi. In the present, Eko dreams of Yemi, who tells him to have Locke lead him to the "question mark." He sees that the center of Locke's map has the mark on it, which leads them to the Beechcraft. Realizing that the area's ground is salted to form a question mark, they find an entrance to the "Pearl" station at the "dot." They find another orientation tape, where Candle uses a different alias and explains that the Swan's computer is a social experiment. Locke loses faith in the computer entirely, but Eko resolves to keep using it. Michael blames the shooting on an escaped Henry and the survivors find Libby barely alive. With Hurley and Jack at her side, she wakes and says Michael's name before dying, but Jack misinterprets this as her asking about his wellbeing.
| 47 | 22 | "Three Minutes" | Stephen Williams | Edward Kitsis & Adam Horowitz | Michael | May 17, 2006 | 14.67 |
In a flashback, Michael goes after Walt but is captured by the Others and taken to their primitive camp. He is asked about Walt's strange behaviors, and after a week is allowed to briefly see him. Walt says that he is forced to take "tests" and the Others aren't who they appear to be before he is taken away, and Michael is instructed to free Henry and bring Jack, Kate, Sawyer, and Hurley to them to get Walt back. In the present, he fails to convince Hurley to fight the Others, and Sayid becomes suspicious when Michael refuses to take him along. Charlie finds a vaccination kit in the pallet and gives it to Claire. Vincent leads him to the last of the statues, which he throws into the ocean. At Ana Lucia and Libby's funeral, Hurley decides to go with Michael, and the survivors notice a boat in the water nearby.
| 48 49 | 23 24 | "Live Together, Die Alone" | Jack Bender | Carlton Cuse & Damon Lindelof | Desmond | May 24, 2006 | 17.84 |
Desmond is forbidden to pursue his lover Penny Widmore by her father Charles. He resolves to win Widmore's sailing race and is given the Elizabeth, Libby's boat, after meeting her. He crashes on the island and is taken in by Inman, working the Swan alone after the map's artist, Stuart Radzinsky, committed suicide. He spends three years as his partner, but realizes Inman is tricking him with stories of disease and plans to leave with the boat. He accidentally kills Inman in a struggle, letting the timer run over in the process. He considers suicide, only to hear Locke pounding on the hatch (Note: As depicted in "Deus Ex Machina".) and finding hope for rescue. In the present, Desmond is on the Elizabeth, and Locke has him seal the computer room, planning to let the timer expire. While Eko and Charlie fail to blow the doors, Desmond finds the printed logs and realizes his failure to press the button trigged an EMP that crashed Flight 815, and that the Pearl's experiment was on its own inhabitants, not the Swan's. Locke destroys the computer and Desmond is forced to terminate the system, causing the Swan to explode. Only Charlie returns, reconciling with Claire. Michael's group are captured by the Others and taken to a dock where "Henry" reveals himself as their leader. Michael and Walt are given a boat and sent away, while Hurley is instructed to tell the survivors to stay out of the Others' territory. Two scientists are alerted to an "anomaly" and call Penny, telling her, "I think we found it."

== Home media release ==
The second season was released as a widescreen seven-disc Region 1 DVD box set in the United States on September 5, 2006, and in the United Kingdom on October 2, 2006, titled Lost: The Complete Second Season – The Extended Experience. Each of these releases also contains extras, including behind-the-scenes footage, deleted scenes, audio commentaries, and a "Lost Connections" chart, which shows how all of the characters on the island are inter-connected with each other. The season was subsequently released on Blu-ray Disc on June 16, 2009.

The series was initially released in two sets in the United Kingdom: the first twelve episodes were released as a widescreen four-disc DVD box set on July 17, 2006, and the remaining episodes of the second season were released as a four-disc DVD box set on October 2, 2006. The set was released in Region 4 on October 4, 2006.

Lost: The Complete Second Season – The Extended Experience
| Set details | | | Special features | | |
| 24 episodes; 7-disc set; 1.78:1 aspect ratio; Subtitles: English; Subtitles: Spanish, French, Portuguese, Chinese (Blu-ray only); English (Dolby Digital 5.1 Surround) – DVD; English (DTS-HD Master Audio 5.1 Surround) – Blu-ray; Audio Commentaries; Runtime: 1056 minutes | | | Audio commentaries on: "Man of Science, Man of Faith" by Damon Lindelof, Carlton Cuse, Bryan Burk, and Jack Bender; "What Kate Did" by Paul Edwards, Michael Bonvillain, and Evangeline Lilly; "The 23rd Psalm" by Damon Lindelof, Carlton Cuse, and Bryan Burk; "The Whole Truth" by Elizabeth Sarnoff, Christina M. Kim, Yunjin Kim, and Daniel Dae Kim; "Dave" by Jack Bender, Jorge Garcia, and Cynthia Watros; Phase 1: Observation; Fire + Water: Anatomy of an Episode; Lost: On Location; The World According to Sawyer; Phase 2: Conditioning; The Lost Flashbacks; Abandoned; Lockdown: Locke's Father; Deleted scenes; Lost bloopers; Phase 3: Conclusion; Lost Connections; Mysteries, Theories, and Conspiracies; Secrets from the Hatch | | |
Release dates
| United States; Canada | Mexico; Australia | Japan | United Kingdom | | |
| United States; Canada | Mexico; Australia | Japan | Part 1 | Part 2 | Complete |
| September 5, 2006 | October 4, 2006 | March 21, 2007 | July 17, 2006 | October 4, 2006 | |
