= Steven Maeda =

American screenwriter

- Occupations: Television producer, screenwriter, television writer
- Years active: 2000–present

Steven Maeda is an American television producer and screenwriter. He has written episodes of television series such as Harsh Realm, The X-Files, CSI: Miami, Lost, and Day Break. He has also served as a supervising producer on Lost and CSI: Miami. He was also the executive producer of Lie To Me and is currently the executive producer of One Piece, having served as one of the showrunners for its first season.

== Career ==
Maeda joined the crew of Lost as a supervising producer and writer for the series second season in 2005. Maeda and the Lost writing staff won the Writers Guild of America (WGA) Award for Best Dramatic Series at the February 2006 ceremony for their work on the first and second seasons. The writing staff were nominated for the award again at the February 2007 ceremony for their work on the second and third seasons. Maeda did not return for the series' third season.

In 2011, Maeda was hired as showrunner of Pan Am, in the middle of its first season. He also served as executive producer and showrunner for Syfy's Helix. In January 2020, he was announced as the showrunner of One Piece, a Netflix original series based on the manga series by Eiichiro Oda.

== Filmography ==
Year	Title	Writer	Executive producer	Showrunner	Notes
2000	Harsh Realm	Yes	Yes		
2000–2002	The X-Files	Yes			Also story editor
2002–2005	CSI: Miami	Yes	Yes		
2005–2006	Lost	Yes	Yes		
2006–2007	Day Break	Yes	Yes		
2009	Lie to Me	Yes	Yes		
2010	Miami Medical	Yes	Yes		
2011–2012	Pan Am		Yes	Yes	
2012	Unforgettable	Yes	Yes		
2014–2015	Helix	Yes	Yes	Yes	
2016–2017	Conviction		Yes		
2018	Salvation	Yes	Yes		
2023	One Piece	Yes	Yes	Yes	
