= L. Scott Caldwell =

American actress (born 1950)

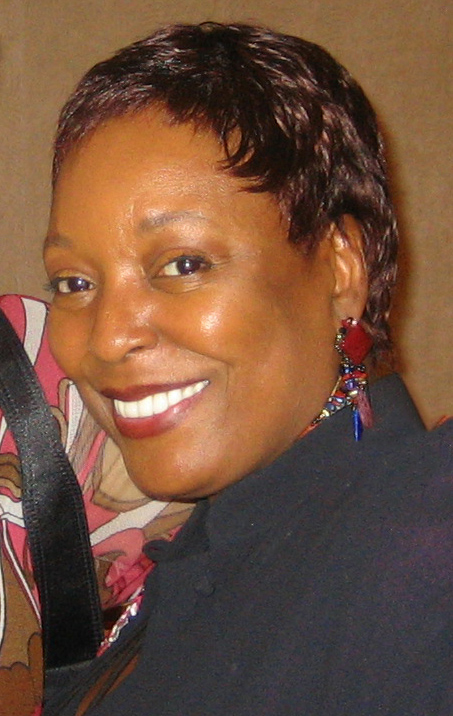
- Caldwell in 2007
- Born: Laverne Scott; 1950 (age 75–76); Chicago, Illinois, U.S.
- Other name: Scotty Caldwell
- Education: Northwestern University; Loyola University Chicago (BA)
- Occupation: Actress
- Years active: 1974–present
- Spouse(s): John Caldwell (divorced) Dasal Banks (m. 2004; died 2005)
- Children: 1

L. Scott Caldwell (born Laverne Scott, born 1950) is an American actress best known for her roles as Deputy U.S. Marshall Erin Poole in The Fugitive (1993) and Rose on the television series Lost.

== Early life ==
Born in Chicago, Illinois, to working-class parents, Laverne Scott grew up in the Woodlawn neighborhood on the South Side. At a high enrollment elementary school, she attended the morning session, and her older siblings went to school in the afternoon. When the school released her at noon she was escorted to a neighborhood theater where she was minded by a friend of her mother. While attending Hyde Park High School, she joined the drama club.

Her class went to see a performance of A Day of Absence, featuring Douglas Turner Ward, a co-founder of The Negro Ensemble Company. It was the first time she saw professional black actors on stage. After graduating high school in 1967, she attended Northwestern University. She left after one year and went to work full-time as an operator at Illinois Bell. She got married and had a son. She transferred her credits to Loyola University-Chicago and earned a bachelor's degree in Theater Arts and Communications.

== Career ==
Caldwell planned on a teaching career and taught at Chicago High School of the Performing Arts. She also worked a year for the Chicago Council on Fine Arts as an artist-in-residence. While in Chicago Caldwell performed in local theatrical productions at the Body Politic, Court Theater, and Eleventh Street Theater. She went to New York in 1978 to audition for Uta Hagen's school HB Studio. While waiting to audition she saw an ad for The Negro Ensemble Company. After her audition at Hagen's school, she took the subway to the NEC.

Caldwell was initially rebuffed by the person who interviewed her but she insisted on meeting with Ward. She used the three pieces she performed at her audition for Hagen. She was accepted by both Hagen and Ward. During her first season at NEC Caldwell performed in several plays. One of those plays, Home, by Samm Art Williams, took her to Broadway's Cort Theatre in 1980. The play was critically acclaimed and earned a Tony Award nomination for Charles Brown. After Home closed Caldwell worked in several regional theater productions including Boesman and Lena at Milwaukee Repertory Theatre and A Raisin in the Sun at Studio Arena Theatre in Buffalo, New York.

In December 1984, while working in A Play of Giants, Caldwell was struck by a car while hailing a cab on Columbus Avenue in New York. She suffered a severe back injury and was unable to work for nearly two years. Her first audition after her recovery was for August Wilson's Joe Turner's Come and Gone. Her performance as Bertha Holly earned her a 1988 Tony Award. Soon after winning the Tony, she moved to southern California to work in television and film. She has been extremely busy, working in several cities in the U.S., Canada, and South Africa, and continues to work in theater. She returned to Broadway in 1997 as the lead in Neil Simon's short-lived Proposals. After Proposals closed Caldwell performed the role of Leah, Little Augie's sister, in New York City Center's "Encores! Great American Musicals in Concert" production of St. Louis Woman.

In 2006, she made her Goodman Theatre debut in Regina Taylor's The Dreams of Sarah Breedlove. In 2011, she took on the role of Lena Younger in the Ebony Repertory Theatre production of the Lorraine Hansberry classic A Raisin in the Sun. The play was directed by Phylicia Rashad. Caldwell, along with the entire cast, was nominated for the LA Stage Alliance 2011 Ovation Award for her work as Lena, for which she won the 2011 Los Angeles Drama Critics Circle Award.

Caldwell is an active member of Unite For Strength, the Screen Actors Guild coalition in favor of joining with AFTRA. On September 19, 2008, she won a seat as an alternate on the national board of directors and the Hollywood division board of directors. Caldwell was elected to a second one-year term on September 24, 2009. She served on the Seniors, Legislative, Women, Holiday Host, Honors and Tributes, and EEOC committees. In September 2010, she was elected to a one-year term on the national board of directors. She served as the national chair of the Women's committee. In 2011, Caldwell was on the SAG national board of directors ballot for a fourth consecutive year. She won a three-year term on the national and Hollywood boards. She would serve as national chair of Women, and Healthcare Safetynet committees.

In 2016, she was part of the PBS Civil War drama series Mercy Street.

== Personal life ==
In her early twenties, Scott married John Caldwell and had a son, Ominara. She was divorced in the early 1980s and was married again (on her birthday) in 2004 to artist/photographer/director Dasal Banks. Banks suffered from cancer and died in May 2005. Caldwell completed her husband's final film, My Brothers and Me, a documentary created to raise awareness about prostate cancer among black men.

Caldwell gives lectures and appears on panels concerning African American actors. In 2007, she participated in tributes to August Wilson at Goodman Theatre in conjunction with Congo Square Theatre Company in Chicago, and at St. Louis Black Repertory Company. In June 2008, she participated in the NAACP Theatre Awards Festival Actors on Acting panel. In June 2009, Caldwell moderated a panel of actors, directors, and casting directors discussing African American Images in Hollywood. In February 2010, she directed a staged reading of Standing On My Sisters' Shoulders for the Los Angeles chapter of Actors Equity Association.

== Filmography ==
=== Film ===
| Year | Title | Role | Notes |
|---|---|---|---|
| 1983 | Without a Trace | Janet Smith | |
| 1984 | Exterminator 2 | Patron | |
| 1991 | Us Against the Wall | Sandy Wilkes | |
| 1991 | Dutch | Homeless Woman | |
| 1993 | The Fugitive | Deputy US Marshal Erin Poole | |
| 1993 | Extreme Justice | Devlin | |
| 1995 | Soweto Green | Cora Tshabalala | |
| 1995 | Waiting to Exhale | Bernadine's Divorce Attorney | |
| 1995 | The Net | Court Appointed Attorney | |
| 1995 | Devil in a Blue Dress | Hattie Mae Parsons | |
| 1999 | Mystery, Alaska | Judge McGibbons | |
| 2002 | Dragonfly | Nurse | |
| 2006 | Gridiron Gang | Bobbi Porter | |
| 2009 | Powder Blue | Nurse Gomez | |
| 2010 | Like Dandelion Dust | Allyson Bower | |
| 2010 | Lisa Trotter | Lisa Trotter | |
| 2011 | The Lamp | Miss Esther | |
| 2015 | Division 19 | Michelle Jacobs | |
| 2015 | That Gal... Who Was in That Thing | Herself | Documentary |
| 2015 | The Perfect Guy | Evelyn | |
| 2015 | Concussion | Mrs. Waters | |
| 2017 | The Case for Christ | Alfie Davis | |
| 2021 | Bingo Hell | Dolores | |

=== Television ===
| Year | Title | Role | Notes |
|---|---|---|---|
| 1982 | All My Children | Nurse | 1 episode |
| 1983 | American Playhouse | Edith | Episode: "The Files on Jill Hatch: Part II" |
| 1988 | The Cosby Show | Elizabeth | Episode: "Out of Brooklyn" |
| 1988 | God Bless the Child | Althea Watkins | TV movie |
| 1988 | TV 101 | Mrs. Hines | Episode: "Home" |
| 1989 | Alien Nation | Lyddie Tuggles | TV movie |
| 1989 | L.A. Law | Wanda Havens | Episode: "Leave it to Geezer" |
| 1989 | Tour of Duty | Selma Binion | Episode: "Promised Land" |
| 1989 | Hunter | Gloria Tessel | Episode: "Last Run" |
| 1990 | Dangerous Passion | Ruby | TV movie |
| 1990 | Doogie Howser, M.D. | Mrs. Alexander | Episode: "Use a Slurpy, Go to Jail" |
| 1990 | The Outsiders | Barbra Richards | Episode: "Pilot" |
| 1991 | Love, Lies and Murder | Judge Starkey | Episodes: 1.1 & 1.2 |
| 1991 | Equal Justice | Mrs. Ida Bolton | Episode: "The Big Game and Other Crimes" |
| 1991 | Thirtysomething | Alice | Episode: "Hopeless" |
| 1991 | Baby of the Bride | Unknown | TV movie |
| 1992 | The Heights | Joanne | Episode: "No Place Like Home" |
| 1993 | The Switch | Mrs. Linson | TV movie |
| 1993 | Darkness Before Dawn | Unknown | TV movie |
| 1993 | Reasonable Doubts | Eleanor Gilbert | Episode: "Sister, Can You Spare a Dime?" |
| 1993 | For the Love of My Child: The Anissa Ayala Story | Rita | TV movie |
| 1993 | Lois & Clark: The New Adventures of Superman | Carol Sherman | Episode: "The Green, Green Glow of Home" |
| 1994 | Melrose Place | Judge Maxine Marco | Episode: "With This Ball and Chain" |
| 1995 | Grace Under Fire | Carol Briscoe | Episode: "Sticks and Stones" |
| 1995 | Down Came a Blackbird | Cerises | TV movie |
| 1996 | Twilight Man | Detective Lou Shannon | TV movie |
| 1996 | The Pretender | Gwen Porter | Episode: "Pilot" |
| 1996 | Dying to Be Perfect: The Ellen Hart Pena Story | Dr. Wallace | TV movie |
| 1997 | Murder One | Anna Mae Brown | Episode: "Chapter Eleven, Year Two" |
| 1997 | Weapons of Mass Distraction | Senator Condon | TV movie |
| 1998 | Any Day Now | Mrs. Opal Lee | Episode: "Making Music with the Wrong Man" |
| 1998 | Promised Land | Jury Forewoman | Episode: "Jury Duty" |
| 1999 | The Last Man on Planet Earth | Ester | TV movie |
| 1999 | JAG | Mrs. Flora Springs | Episode: "Nobody's Child" |
| 1999 | Chicago Hope | Bonnie Medina | Episode: "A Goy and His Dog" |
| 1999 | Intimate Betrayal | Detective Sheila Monroe | TV movie |
| 1999–2000 | Judging Amy | Tanya Miller | 7 episodes |
| 2000 | City of Angels | Angela Patterson | Episodes: "Deliver the Male", "Assume the Position", "The Prince and the Porker" |
| 2001 | The Division | Detective Reese | Episode: "The Fear Factor" |
| 2001 | Kate Brasher | Mrs. Rumel | Episode: "Simon" |
| 2001 | The Practice | Parole Board Chairwoman Susan Moton | Episode: "Killing Time" |
| 2001 | Passions | Clinic Counselor | Episode: #1.630 |
| 2002 | The Court | Anne Marie | Episode: "Due Process" |
| 2003 | Queens Supreme | Judge Rose Barnea | 13 episodes |
| 2003 | Nip/Tuck | Dr. Reed | Episode: "Montana/Sassy/Justicce" |
| 2004–2006 | ER | Dr. Rabb | Episodes: "NICU", "Graduation Day" |
| 2004–2010 | Lost | Rose Nadler | 23 episodes |
| 2006 | Cold Case | Alice Stallworth | Episode: "Sandhogs" |
| 2006 | Ghost Whisperer | Liz Nelson | Episode: "The Ghost Within" |
| 2007 | Jozi-H | Dr. Laura Shields | Episode: "Love in the Time of Aids" |
| 2007 | State of Mind | Mrs. Williams | Episode: "Lost & Found" |
| 2007 | Saving Grace | Dee Reynolds | Episode: "Everything's Got a Shelf Life" |
| 2007 | Without a Trace | Reverend Anna Washington | Episode: "Baggage" |
| 2008–2013 | The Secret Life of the American Teenager | Margaret Shakur | 32 episodes |
| 2009–2013 | Southland | Enid Adams | 7 episodes |
| 2011 | Grey's Anatomy | Allison Cobb | Episode: "Don't Deceive Me (Please Don't Go)" |
| 2011 | CSI: Crime Scene Investigation | Nora Parkes | Episode: "In a Dark, Dark House" |
| 2012 | My America | Narrator | Episode: "Bellagio" |
| 2012 | Private Practice | Jillian McCray | Episode: "The Next Episode" |
| 2013 | Low Winter Sun | Violet Geddes | 5 episodes |
| 2013 | Criminal Minds | Tina Johnson | Episode: "Strange Fruit" |
| 2015 | Madam Secretary | Afeni Rahim | Episode: "You Say You Want a Revolution" |
| 2016–2017 | Mercy Street | Belinda | 11 episodes |
| 2017 | Brooklyn Nine-Nine | Judge Laverne Holt | Episode: "Your Honor" |
| 2017 | How to Get Away with Murder | Jasmine Bromelle | 5 episodes |
| 2017 | The Last Tycoon | Lucille | Episodes: "More Stars Than There Are in Heaven", "Eine Kleine Reichmusik" |
| 2017 | The Trustee | Odelle Jones | TV movie |
| 2017–2021 | Insecure | Carol Carter | 8 episodes |
| 2018 | Dynasty | Granny | Episode: "Trashy Little Tramp" |
| 2018–2020 | Chilling Adventures of Sabrina | Nana Ruth | Episodes: "Chapter Seven", "Chapter Ten", "Chapter Twenty-One", "Chapter Thirty-One" |
| 2018–2019 | A Million Little Things | Renee Howard | Episodes: "Goodnight", "Austin", "The Game of Your Life" |
| 2018–2021 | Queen Sugar | Willa Mae Desonier | Episodes: "Late-April 2020", "Study War No More" |
| 2019 | Law & Order: Special Victims Unit | Jo Anderson | Episode: "Diss" |
| 2019–2021 | All Rise | Roxy Robinson | 7 episodes |
| 2020 | Sacred Lies | Dalia | Episodes: "Chapter Ten: With the Dancing Lions", "Chapter Nine: Bloodline" |
| 2020 | Lucifer | Lily Rose | Episode: "It Never Ends Well for the Chicken" |
| 2020 | Love in the Time of Corona | Nanda | Episodes: "Love and Protest", "Seriously Now", "#RelationshipGoals", "The Course of Love" |
| 2021 | One of Us Is Lying | Nonny | Episode: "Pilot" |
| 2021–2022 | Our Kind of People | Olivia Sturgess Dupont | 8 episodes |
| 2023 | The Good Doctor | Evelyn Allen | Episode: "Hard Heart" |
| 2024–present | Bad Monkey | YaYa | 10 episodes |
| 2026 | The Rookie | Mabel Sinclair | Episode: Cut and Run |

=== Theatre ===
- 2017 Gem of the Ocean as Aunt Ester Tyler
- 2014 What I Learned In Paris as Eve Madison
- 2014 The Wife's Story as She
- 2011 A Raisin in the Sun as Lena Younger
- 2011 The Circle as Donna
- 2009 Reverse Transcription Staged Reading as Ottoline
- 2006 The Dreams of Sarah Breedlove as Sarah Breedlove / Madam C.J. Walker
- 2000–2005 Going to St. Ives (radio broadcast and recording) as May N'Kame
- 1998 St. Louis Woman as Leah
- 1997 Proposals as Clemma Diggins
- 1997 Macbeth as Lady Macbeth
- 1995 American Medea as Medea
- 1991 The Piano Lesson as Berniece
- 1990 From the Mississippi Delta as Miss Rosebud / Brother Pastor
- 1987–1988 Joe Turner's Come and Gone as Bertha Holly
- 1987 A Month of Sundays as Understudy Mrs. Baker
- 1986 Elegies for the Fallen Staged Reading
- 1984 A Play of Giants as Ambassador
- 1983 About Heaven & Earth as Black Woman, The Redeemer / Raimy, Nightline
- 1982 A Raisin in the Sun as Ruth Younger
- 1982 Colored Peoples Time as Catherine / Addie / Nadine / Ida
- 1982 Boesman and Lena as Lena
- 1980–1981 Home as Pattie Mae Wells / Woman One (Broadway debut)
- 1979 A Season to Unravel as Afrodite
- 1979 Plays From Africa – Everyman & The Imprisonment of Obatala
- 1979 Old Phantoms as Ruth
- 1978 Daughters of the Mock as Gail
- 1977 The Thesmophoriazousae as Sosie (Chicago – Court Theatre)
- 1975 The Other Cinderella (Chicago – Club Misty)
- 1974 No Place to Be Somebody: A Black-Black Comedy as Cora Beasley (Loyola University student production)
- A Raisin in the Sun as Travis Younger (Hyde Park High School student production)

=== Director ===
- 2009 My Brothers and Me Documentary
- 2010 Standing On My Sisters' Shoulders Staged Reading

=== Commercials ===
- 1989 The United Negro College Fund – Little Brother as Mother
- 1992 McDonald's – Grapevine as Calvin's Mother

=== Radio ===
- 1982 WBAI – Reena by Paule Marshall as The Narrator

== Awards and nominations ==
Awards

- 2011 Los Angeles Drama Critics Circle Award for Lead Performance and Ensemble Performance – A Raisin in the Sun
- 2006 BTAA Award for Best leading actress in a play – The Dreams of Sarah Breedlove
- 2005 Obie Award for Performance in a play – Going to St. Ives
- 1998 Helen Hayes Award for Supporting actress in a non-resident production – Proposals
- 1997 Drama-Logue Award for Performance in a play – Proposals
- 1990 Drama-Logue Award for Ensemble performance – From The Mississippi Delta
- 1988 Tony Award for Best Featured Actress in a Play – Joe Turner's Come and Gone

Nominations

- 2011 Ovation Award for Best Acting Ensemble in a Play – A Raisin in the Sun
- 2007 Gemini Award (Canadian television) for Best actress in a guest performance – Jozi-H
- 2005 Outer Critics Circle Award for Outstanding actress in a play – Going to St. Ives
- 1998 FANY (FAns of NY Theatre) Award for Outstanding actress in a play – Proposals
