= List of Lost episodes =

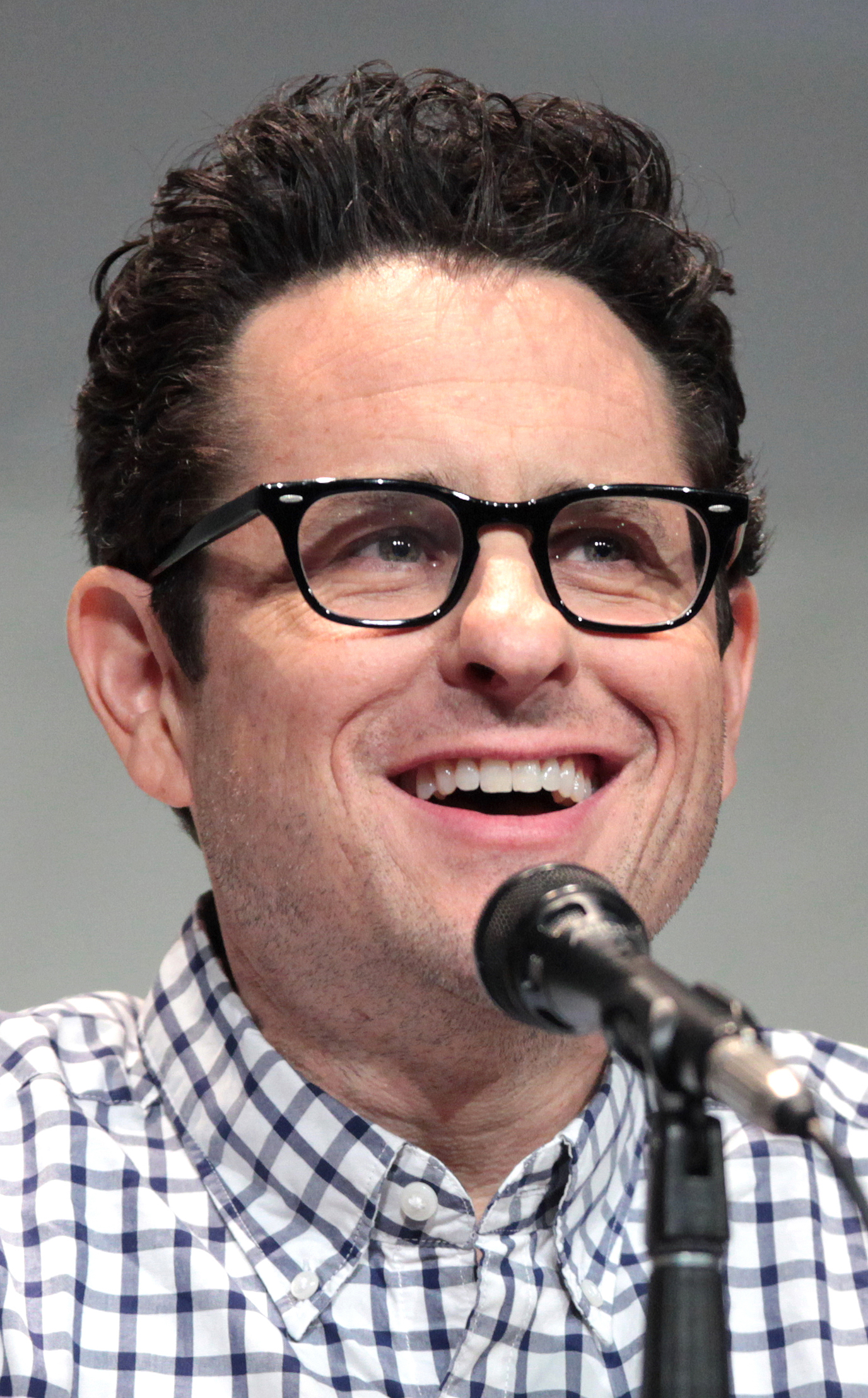
J. J. Abrams, one of the co-creators of Lost, directed the pilot episode.

Lost is an American serial drama television series created by J. J. Abrams and Damon Lindelof for ABC. Abrams directed the pilot episode, which was based upon an original script titled Nowhere written by Jeffrey Lieber. Six seasons of the show aired, in addition to numerous clip shows to recap previous episodes.

The series follows the experiences of the survivors of a plane crash on a passenger jet, Oceanic Flight 815, which crashed on a tropical island in the South Pacific, with each episode typically featuring action on the island as well as a secondary storyline from another point in a character's life. The series also includes stories of the lives of people already living on the island—they include the "Others", who initially antagonize the survivors, as well as a group of people who arrive on the freighter Kahana. Lost: Missing Pieces consists of thirteen original two- to three-minute clips referred to as "mobisodes" which were produced for cell phones and released between seasons three and four. Multiple former and recurring cast members made an appearance in the series finale.

During the course of the series, 121 episodes of Lost aired over six seasons, between September 22, 2004, and May 23, 2010.

== Series overview ==
Season	Episodes	Originally released		Avg. viewers (millions)	Rank
Season	Episodes	First released	Last released	Avg. viewers (millions)	Rank
1	25	September 22, 2004	May 25, 2005	15.69	15
2	24	September 21, 2005	May 24, 2006	15.50	15
3	23	October 4, 2006	May 23, 2007	17.84	10
4	14	January 31, 2008	May 29, 2008	13.40	17
5	17	January 21, 2009	May 13, 2009	10.94	28
6	18	February 2, 2010	May 23, 2010	10.08	31

== Episodes ==
In the following list, the term "featured character(s)" refers to the character or characters who are featured in the secondary storyline of each episode.

=== Season 1 (2004–05) ===
Season 1 aired from September 22, 2004, to May 25, 2005. In addition to the twenty-four regular episodes in season one, a special, "Lost: The Journey", aired on April 27, 2005, to put the mysteries of the island and the characters in perspective in the lead-up to the season finale.

Season 1 begins when a plane crash strands the surviving passengers of Oceanic Flight 815 on a seemingly deserted tropical island, forcing the group of strangers to work together to stay alive. However, their survival is threatened by several mysteries, including the contents of a hatch buried in the ground, an unknown entity that roams the jungle, and the motives of the inhabitants already living on the island known as the "Others". Season 1 covers a narrative time of 44 days.

The first season averaged 15.69 million viewers per episode. The average of the live ratings presented below for season one is 18.38 million viewers per episode.

No. overall	No. in season	Title	Directed by	Written by	Featured character(s)	Original release date	U.S. viewers (millions)
1	1	"Pilot"	J. J. Abrams	Story by : Jeffrey Lieber and J. J. Abrams & Damon Lindelof; Teleplay by : J. J. Abrams & Damon Lindelof	Jack	September 22, 2004	18.65
2	2	"Pilot"	J. J. Abrams	Story by : Jeffrey Lieber and J. J. Abrams & Damon Lindelof; Teleplay by : J. J. Abrams & Damon Lindelof	Charlie & Kate	September 29, 2004	17.00
3	3	"Tabula Rasa"	Jack Bender	Damon Lindelof	Kate	October 6, 2004	16.54
4	4	"Walkabout"	Jack Bender	David Fury	Locke	October 13, 2004	18.16
5	5	"White Rabbit"	Kevin Hooks	Christian Taylor	Jack	October 20, 2004	16.82
6	6	"House of the Rising Sun"	Michael Zinberg	Javier Grillo-Marxuach	Sun	October 27, 2004	16.83
7	7	"The Moth"	Jack Bender	Jennifer Johnson & Paul Dini	Charlie	November 3, 2004	18.73
8	8	"Confidence Man"	Tucker Gates	Damon Lindelof	Sawyer	November 10, 2004	18.44
9	9	"Solitary"	Greg Yaitanes	David Fury	Sayid	November 17, 2004	17.64
10	10	"Raised by Another"	Marita Grabiak	Lynne E. Litt	Claire	December 1, 2004	17.15
11	11	"All the Best Cowboys Have Daddy Issues"	Stephen Williams	Javier Grillo-Marxuach	Jack	December 8, 2004	18.88
12	12	"Whatever the Case May Be"	Jack Bender	Damon Lindelof & Jennifer Johnson	Kate	January 5, 2005	21.59
13	13	"Hearts and Minds"	Rod Holcomb	Carlton Cuse & Javier Grillo-Marxuach	Boone	January 12, 2005	20.81
14	14	"Special"	Greg Yaitanes	David Fury	Michael & Walt	January 19, 2005	19.69
15	15	"Homecoming"	Kevin Hooks	Damon Lindelof	Charlie	February 9, 2005	19.48
16	16	"Outlaws"	Jack Bender	Drew Goddard	Sawyer	February 16, 2005	17.88
17	17	"...In Translation"	Tucker Gates	Javier Grillo-Marxuach & Leonard Dick	Jin	February 23, 2005	19.49
18	18	"Numbers"	Daniel Attias	David Fury & Brent Fletcher	Hurley	March 2, 2005	18.85
19	19	"Deus Ex Machina"	Robert Mandel	Carlton Cuse & Damon Lindelof	Locke	March 30, 2005	17.75
20	20	"Do No Harm"	Stephen Williams	Janet Tamaro	Jack	April 6, 2005	17.12
21	21	"The Greater Good"	David Grossman	Leonard Dick	Sayid	May 4, 2005	17.20
22	22	"Born to Run"	Tucker Gates	Story by : Javier Grillo-Marxuach; Teleplay by : Edward Kitsis & Adam Horowitz	Kate	May 11, 2005	17.10
23	23	"Exodus (Part 1)"	Jack Bender	Damon Lindelof & Carlton Cuse	various	May 18, 2005	18.62
24	24	"Exodus (Parts 2 & 3)"	Jack Bender	Damon Lindelof & Carlton Cuse	various	May 25, 2005	20.71
25	25	"Exodus (Parts 2 & 3)"	Jack Bender	Damon Lindelof & Carlton Cuse	various	May 25, 2005	20.71

=== Season 2 (2005–06) ===
Season two aired from September 21, 2005, to May 24, 2006. In addition to the twenty-three regular episodes, three specials were aired that provided recaps and insights into the show's mysteries. There were several cast changes in season two. Ian Somerhalder, who played Boone, left the show, while Malcolm David Kelley, who played Walt, only appeared in four episodes. Michelle Rodriguez, Adewale Akinnuoye-Agbaje and Cynthia Watros joined the main cast as Ana Lucia, Mr. Eko and Libby, respectively.

Season two introduced several new characters to the series, including the plane's tail-section survivors and other island inhabitants. More island mythologies and insights into the survivors' pasts are divulged. The existence of the Dharma Initiative and its benefactor, the Hanso Foundation, is established. The truth about the "Others" begins to unfold. Season two takes place over 23 days.

The second season averaged a total of 15.50 million viewers. The average of the live ratings presented below for season two is 18.91 million viewers per episode.

No. overall	No. in season	Title	Directed by	Written by	Featured character(s)	Original release date	U.S. viewers (millions)
26	1	"Man of Science, Man of Faith"	Jack Bender	Damon Lindelof	Jack	September 21, 2005	23.47
27	2	"Adrift"	Stephen Williams	Steven Maeda & Leonard Dick	Michael	September 28, 2005	23.17
28	3	"Orientation"	Jack Bender	Javier Grillo-Marxuach & Craig Wright	Locke	October 5, 2005	22.38
29	4	"Everybody Hates Hugo"	Alan Taylor	Edward Kitsis & Adam Horowitz	Hurley	October 12, 2005	21.67
30	5	"...And Found"	Stephen Williams	Carlton Cuse & Damon Lindelof	Sun & Jin	October 19, 2005	21.38
31	6	"Abandoned"	Adam Davidson	Elizabeth Sarnoff	Shannon	November 9, 2005	20.01
32	7	"The Other 48 Days"	Eric Laneuville	Damon Lindelof & Carlton Cuse	Ana Lucia, Bernard, Libby and Mr. Eko	November 16, 2005	21.87
33	8	"Collision"	Stephen Williams	Javier Grillo-Marxuach & Leonard Dick	Ana Lucia	November 23, 2005	19.29
34	9	"What Kate Did"	Paul Edwards	Steven Maeda & Craig Wright	Kate	November 30, 2005	21.54
35	10	"The 23rd Psalm"	Matt Earl Beesley	Carlton Cuse & Damon Lindelof	Mr. Eko	January 11, 2006	20.56
36	11	"The Hunting Party"	Stephen Williams	Elizabeth Sarnoff & Christina M. Kim	Jack	January 18, 2006	19.13
37	12	"Fire + Water"	Jack Bender	Edward Kitsis & Adam Horowitz	Charlie	January 25, 2006	19.05
38	13	"The Long Con"	Roxann Dawson	Steven Maeda & Leonard Dick	Sawyer	February 8, 2006	18.74
39	14	"One of Them"	Stephen Williams	Damon Lindelof & Carlton Cuse	Sayid	February 15, 2006	18.20
40	15	"Maternity Leave"	Jack Bender	Dawn Lambertsen Kelly & Matt Ragghianti	Claire	March 1, 2006	16.43
41	16	"The Whole Truth"	Karen Gaviola	Elizabeth Sarnoff & Christina M. Kim	Sun	March 22, 2006	16.06
42	17	"Lockdown"	Stephen Williams	Carlton Cuse & Damon Lindelof	Locke	March 29, 2006	16.21
43	18	"Dave"	Jack Bender	Edward Kitsis & Adam Horowitz	Hurley	April 5, 2006	16.38
44	19	"S.O.S."	Eric Laneuville	Steven Maeda & Leonard Dick	Rose & Bernard	April 12, 2006	15.68
45	20	"Two for the Road"	Paul Edwards	Elizabeth Sarnoff & Christina M. Kim	Ana Lucia	May 3, 2006	15.56
46	21	"?"	Deran Sarafian	Damon Lindelof & Carlton Cuse	Mr. Eko	May 10, 2006	16.35
47	22	"Three Minutes"	Stephen Williams	Edward Kitsis & Adam Horowitz	Michael	May 17, 2006	14.67
48 49	23 24	"Live Together, Die Alone"	Jack Bender	Carlton Cuse & Damon Lindelof	Desmond	May 24, 2006	17.84

=== Season 3 (2006–07) ===
Season three began airing on October 4, 2006, and ended on May 23, 2007. There were twenty-two episodes aired in two blocks. The first block consisted of six episodes and aired for six consecutive weeks. After a twelve-week break, the second block aired, and featured the remaining sixteen episodes. In addition to the twenty-two regular season episodes, two specials were aired. "Lost: A Tale of Survival" aired a week before the premiere, and "The Lost Survivor Guide" aired with episode seven, when the season returned from its twelve-week break.

Harold Perrineau Jr., Maggie Grace, Michelle Rodriguez and Cynthia Watros, who played Michael, Shannon, Ana Lucia and Libby, respectively, left the show after the second season. Michael Emerson, as Benjamin Linus (aka "Henry Gale"), and Henry Ian Cusick, as Desmond, became regular cast members in season three. Elizabeth Mitchell joined the main cast as Juliet, as did Kiele Sanchez and Rodrigo Santoro as previously unseen crash survivors Nikki and Paulo, respectively.

Season three continues the story 67 days after the crash. The season begins where the second season left off: three of the crash survivors are held in captivity by the mysterious Others. More backstory on the Others, as well as the Dharma Initiative, is revealed. The survivors face continuous threats from their enemies, and also from their friends. The survivors attempt to make contact with a freighter which they believe is there to rescue them. Season three takes place over 24 days.

The third season averaged a total of 17.84 million viewers. The average of the live ratings presented below for season three is 13.74 million viewers per episode.

No. overall	No. in season	Title	Directed by	Written by	Featured character(s)	Original release date	U.S. viewers (millions)
50	1	"A Tale of Two Cities"	Jack Bender	Story by : Damon Lindelof; Teleplay by : J. J. Abrams & Damon Lindelof	Jack	October 4, 2006	18.82
51	2	"The Glass Ballerina"	Paul Edwards	Jeff Pinkner & Drew Goddard	Sun & Jin	October 11, 2006	16.89
52	3	"Further Instructions"	Stephen Williams	Carlton Cuse & Elizabeth Sarnoff	Locke	October 18, 2006	16.31
53	4	"Every Man for Himself"	Stephen Williams	Edward Kitsis & Adam Horowitz	Sawyer	October 25, 2006	17.09
54	5	"The Cost of Living"	Jack Bender	Alison Schapker & Monica Owusu-Breen	Mr. Eko	November 1, 2006	16.07
55	6	"I Do"	Tucker Gates	Damon Lindelof & Carlton Cuse	Kate	November 8, 2006	17.15
56	7	"Not in Portland"	Stephen Williams	Carlton Cuse & Jeff Pinkner	Juliet	February 7, 2007	14.49
57	8	"Flashes Before Your Eyes"	Jack Bender	Damon Lindelof & Drew Goddard	Desmond	February 14, 2007	12.84
58	9	"Stranger in a Strange Land"	Paris Barclay	Elizabeth Sarnoff & Christina M. Kim	Jack	February 21, 2007	12.95
59	10	"Tricia Tanaka Is Dead"	Eric Laneuville	Edward Kitsis & Adam Horowitz	Hurley	February 28, 2007	12.78
60	11	"Enter 77"	Stephen Williams	Carlton Cuse & Damon Lindelof	Sayid	March 7, 2007	12.45
61	12	"Par Avion"	Paul Edwards	Christina M. Kim & Jordan Rosenberg	Claire	March 14, 2007	12.48
62	13	"The Man from Tallahassee"	Jack Bender	Drew Goddard & Jeff Pinkner	Locke	March 21, 2007	12.22
63	14	"Exposé"	Stephen Williams	Edward Kitsis & Adam Horowitz	Nikki & Paulo	March 28, 2007	11.52
64	15	"Left Behind"	Karen Gaviola	Damon Lindelof & Elizabeth Sarnoff	Kate	April 4, 2007	11.66
65	16	"One of Us"	Jack Bender	Carlton Cuse & Drew Goddard	Juliet	April 11, 2007	12.09
66	17	"Catch-22"	Stephen Williams	Jeff Pinkner & Brian K. Vaughan	Desmond	April 18, 2007	12.08
67	18	"D.O.C."	Frederick E.O. Toye	Edward Kitsis & Adam Horowitz	Sun	April 25, 2007	11.86
68	19	"The Brig"	Eric Laneuville	Damon Lindelof & Carlton Cuse	Locke	May 2, 2007	12.33
69	20	"The Man Behind the Curtain"	Bobby Roth	Elizabeth Sarnoff & Drew Goddard	Ben	May 9, 2007	12.11
70	21	"Greatest Hits"	Stephen Williams	Edward Kitsis & Adam Horowitz	Charlie	May 16, 2007	12.32
71	22	"Through the Looking Glass"	Jack Bender	Carlton Cuse & Damon Lindelof	Jack	May 23, 2007	13.86
72	23	"Through the Looking Glass"	Jack Bender	Carlton Cuse & Damon Lindelof	Jack	May 23, 2007	13.86

=== Season 4 (2008) ===
Season four began airing on January 31, 2008, and concluded on May 29, 2008. Production began in August 2007 and was prematurely stopped in November 2007 due to the 2007–2008 Writers Guild of America strike. The original plan was to air all sixteen episodes in one consecutive block, uninterrupted by repeats. After the strike was resolved, it was decided that the remaining story for the season would be condensed into what co-creator Damon Lindelof called a "lean, mean five". This would include a three-hour finale, after Lindelof and Carlton Cuse petitioned ABC. Due to the time lost to the strike there was a mini-hiatus after the eighth episode had aired. The series resumed with its post-strike episodes on April 24, 2008.

Adewale Akinnuoye-Agbaje, Dominic Monaghan, and Kiele Sanchez and Rodrigo Santoro, who played Mr. Eko, Charlie, and Nikki and Paulo, respectively, left the cast during the third season, and Harold Perrineau rejoined the main cast as Michael. Alongside Perrineau, three new actors joined the main cast. Jeremy Davies, Ken Leung and Rebecca Mader play Daniel Faraday, Miles Straume and Charlotte Lewis respectively.

Season 4 continues the story 91 days after the crash. The season focuses on the survivors splitting into two groups, after making contact with a freighter off-shore. Throughout the season, flashforwards show the lives of the "Oceanic Six", five original survivors and Aaron who make it off the island and have returned to their old lives. The season takes place over 17 days.

The fourth season averaged a total of 13.40 million viewers. The average of the live ratings presented below for season four is 12.73 million viewers per episode.

No. overall	No. in season	Title	Directed by	Written by	Featured character(s)	Original release date	U.S. viewers (millions)
73	1	"The Beginning of the End"	Jack Bender	Damon Lindelof & Carlton Cuse	Hurley	January 31, 2008	16.14
74	2	"Confirmed Dead"	Stephen Williams	Drew Goddard & Brian K. Vaughan	Faraday, Charlotte, Miles, Frank	February 7, 2008	15.29
75	3	"The Economist"	Jack Bender	Edward Kitsis & Adam Horowitz	Sayid	February 14, 2008	13.76
76	4	"Eggtown"	Stephen Williams	Elizabeth Sarnoff & Greggory Nations	Kate	February 21, 2008	13.65
77	5	"The Constant"	Jack Bender	Carlton Cuse & Damon Lindelof	Desmond	February 28, 2008	12.89
78	6	"The Other Woman"	Eric Laneuville	Drew Goddard & Christina M. Kim	Juliet	March 6, 2008	13.01
79	7	"Ji Yeon"	Stephen Semel	Edward Kitsis & Adam Horowitz	Sun & Jin	March 13, 2008	12.08
80	8	"Meet Kevin Johnson"	Stephen Williams	Elizabeth Sarnoff & Brian K. Vaughan	Michael	March 20, 2008	11.46
81	9	"The Shape of Things to Come"	Jack Bender	Brian K. Vaughan & Drew Goddard	Ben	April 24, 2008	12.08
82	10	"Something Nice Back Home"	Stephen Williams	Edward Kitsis & Adam Horowitz	Jack	May 1, 2008	10.73
83	11	"Cabin Fever"	Paul Edwards	Elizabeth Sarnoff & Kyle Pennington	Locke	May 8, 2008	10.78
84	12	"There's No Place Like Home (Part 1)"	Stephen Williams	Damon Lindelof & Carlton Cuse	Jack, Hurley, Sayid, Sun, Kate	May 15, 2008	10.96
85	13	"There's No Place Like Home (Parts 2 & 3)"	Jack Bender	Carlton Cuse & Damon Lindelof	Jack, Hurley, Sayid, Sun, Kate	May 29, 2008	12.30
86	14	"There's No Place Like Home (Parts 2 & 3)"	Jack Bender	Carlton Cuse & Damon Lindelof	Jack, Hurley, Sayid, Sun, Kate	May 29, 2008	12.30

=== Season 5 (2009) ===
Season five began airing on January 21, 2009, and ended on May 13, 2009, featuring seventeen episodes. A clip show recapping the first four seasons preceded the premiere. Season five follows two time lines. The first takes place on the island, where the remaining survivors begin to erratically jump forward and backward through time, following the island being moved in both space and time by Ben, and focuses on the events that lead up to Locke stopping the time jumps and leaving the Island. The second takes place off the island following Locke's death and deals with Jack and Ben's attempt to reunite the Oceanic Six and return to the island with Locke's dead body. The second part of the season starts after the time jumps end and the Oceanic Six return to the island on Ajira Airways Flight 316. The show continues to follow two time lines, both of which take place on the island. The first takes place in 1977 when the survivors who had been left behind are stranded after jumping around in time. It is also where some of the Oceanic Six are transported during the return flight to the island. The second takes place in late 2007 after Flight 316 is forced to crash land on the island.

Harold Perrineau, who plays Michael Dawson, left the cast at the conclusion of the fourth season. Emilie de Ravin, who plays Claire Littleton, was placed on a holding contract, but she returned in the sixth and final season of Lost as a main cast member.

The fifth season averaged a total of 10.94 million viewers. The average of the live ratings presented below for season five is 9.89 million viewers per episode.

No. overall	No. in season	Title	Directed by	Written by	Featured character(s)	Original release date	U.S. viewers (millions)
87	1	"Because You Left"	Stephen Williams	Damon Lindelof & Carlton Cuse	none	January 21, 2009	11.35
88	2	"The Lie"	Jack Bender	Edward Kitsis & Adam Horowitz	Hurley	January 21, 2009	11.35
89	3	"Jughead"	Rod Holcomb	Elizabeth Sarnoff & Paul Zbyszewski	Desmond	January 28, 2009	11.23
90	4	"The Little Prince"	Stephen Williams	Brian K. Vaughan & Melinda Hsu Taylor	Kate	February 4, 2009	11.01
91	5	"This Place Is Death"	Paul Edwards	Edward Kitsis & Adam Horowitz	Sun & Jin	February 11, 2009	9.82
92	6	"316"	Stephen Williams	Damon Lindelof & Carlton Cuse	Jack	February 18, 2009	11.41
93	7	"The Life and Death of Jeremy Bentham"	Jack Bender	Carlton Cuse & Damon Lindelof	Locke	February 25, 2009	10.05
94	8	"LaFleur"	Mark Goldman	Elizabeth Sarnoff & Kyle Pennington	Sawyer	March 4, 2009	10.65
95	9	"Namaste"	Jack Bender	Paul Zbyszewski & Brian K. Vaughan	none	March 18, 2009	9.40
96	10	"He's Our You"	Greg Yaitanes	Edward Kitsis & Adam Horowitz	Sayid	March 25, 2009	9.04
97	11	"Whatever Happened, Happened"	Bobby Roth	Carlton Cuse & Damon Lindelof	Kate	April 1, 2009	9.57
98	12	"Dead Is Dead"	Stephen Williams	Brian K. Vaughan & Elizabeth Sarnoff	Ben	April 8, 2009	8.57
99	13	"Some Like It Hoth"	Jack Bender	Melinda Hsu Taylor & Greggory Nations	Miles	April 15, 2009	9.23
100	14	"The Variable"	Paul Edwards	Edward Kitsis & Adam Horowitz	Faraday	April 29, 2009	9.04
101	15	"Follow the Leader"	Stephen Williams	Paul Zbyszewski & Elizabeth Sarnoff	none	May 6, 2009	8.70
102	16	"The Incident"	Jack Bender	Damon Lindelof & Carlton Cuse	Jacob	May 13, 2009	9.43
103	17	"The Incident"	Jack Bender	Damon Lindelof & Carlton Cuse	Jacob	May 13, 2009	9.43

=== Season 6 (2010) ===
The sixth and final season premiered on February 2, 2010, with a two-hour premiere preceded by a one-hour clip show. The show continued from February 9, 2010, at its new time slot of Tuesdays at 9:00 pm with a total of 18 episodes airing in 16 broadcasts, and ended with a four-and-a-half-hour series finale on Sunday, May 23, 2010. The finale began with a two-hour recap special, and continued with the two-and-a-half-hour final episode.

This season introduced "flash-sideways." It represents a world created by the collective minds of the Oceanic 815 survivors for their souls to find one another in the afterlife and to remember their previous lives together, as revealed in the finale.

Jeremy Davies, Rebecca Mader and Elizabeth Mitchell, who played Daniel Faraday, Charlotte Lewis and Juliet Burke, respectively, left the show after the fifth season, but all three reprised their characters for the sixth. Former recurring cast members Nestor Carbonell, Jeff Fahey and Zuleikha Robinson, who played the roles Richard Alpert, Frank Lapidus and Ilana Verdansky, were promoted to the starring cast, and Emilie de Ravin returned as main character Claire Littleton after a year-long absence.

Multiple former and recurring cast members made an appearance in the final episode. For the special occasion, Sam Anderson, François Chau, L. Scott Caldwell, Jeremy Davies, Fionnula Flanagan, Maggie Grace, Rebecca Mader, Elizabeth Mitchell, Dominic Monaghan, Ian Somerhalder, John Terry, Sonya Walger and Cynthia Watros were listed in the starring cast.

The sixth season totals an average of 10.08 million viewers. The average of the live ratings presented below for season six is 10.16 million viewers per episode.

No. overall	No. in season	Title	Directed by	Written by	Featured character(s)	Original release date	U.S. viewers (millions)
104 105	1 2	"LA X"	Jack Bender	Damon Lindelof & Carlton Cuse	various	February 2, 2010	12.09
106	3	"What Kate Does"	Paul Edwards	Edward Kitsis & Adam Horowitz	Kate	February 9, 2010	11.05
107	4	"The Substitute"	Tucker Gates	Elizabeth Sarnoff & Melinda Hsu Taylor	Locke	February 16, 2010	9.82
108	5	"Lighthouse"	Jack Bender	Carlton Cuse & Damon Lindelof	Jack	February 23, 2010	9.95
109	6	"Sundown"	Bobby Roth	Paul Zbyszewski & Graham Roland	Sayid	March 2, 2010	9.29
110	7	"Dr. Linus"	Mario Van Peebles	Edward Kitsis & Adam Horowitz	Ben	March 9, 2010	9.49
111	8	"Recon"	Jack Bender	Elizabeth Sarnoff & Jim Galasso	Sawyer	March 16, 2010	8.87
112	9	"Ab Aeterno"	Tucker Gates	Melinda Hsu Taylor & Greggory Nations	Richard	March 23, 2010	9.31
113	10	"The Package"	Paul Edwards	Paul Zbyszewski & Graham Roland	Sun & Jin	March 30, 2010	10.13
114	11	"Happily Ever After"	Jack Bender	Carlton Cuse & Damon Lindelof	Desmond	April 6, 2010	9.55
115	12	"Everybody Loves Hugo"	Daniel Attias	Edward Kitsis & Adam Horowitz	Hurley	April 13, 2010	9.48
116	13	"The Last Recruit"	Stephen Semel	Paul Zbyszewski & Graham Roland	various	April 20, 2010	9.53
117	14	"The Candidate"	Jack Bender	Elizabeth Sarnoff & Jim Galasso	Jack & Locke	May 4, 2010	9.59
118	15	"Across the Sea"	Tucker Gates	Carlton Cuse & Damon Lindelof	Jacob & Man in Black	May 11, 2010	10.32
119	16	"What They Died For"	Paul Edwards	Edward Kitsis & Adam Horowitz & Elizabeth Sarnoff	various	May 18, 2010	10.47
120 121	17 18	"The End"	Jack Bender	Damon Lindelof & Carlton Cuse	various	May 23, 2010	13.57

== Specials ==
=== Epilogue ===
Title	Directed by	Written by	Featured character(s)	Original release date
"The New Man in Charge"	Paul Edwards	Melinda Hsu Taylor, Graham Roland & Jim Galasso	Hurley, Ben & Walt	August 24, 2010 (on DVD)
Following the events of the series finale, Ben relieves two Dharma Initiative employees of their duties before answering a few lingering questions. Afterwards, Ben recruits an old friend to rejoin him on the island.

=== Mobisodes: Lost: Missing Pieces ===
Lost: Missing Pieces consists of thirteen original two- to three-minute clips referred to as "mobisodes" which were produced for cell phones and released between seasons three and four. Six days after they became available for cell phones, they could be streamed from ABC.com. "Prod. no." stands for production code number, which indicates in what order the mobisodes were produced, and in the order they appear on the DVD and Blu-ray.

No.	Title	Directed by	Written by	Featured character(s)	Original release date	Prod. code
1	"The Watch"	Jack Bender	Carlton Cuse	Jack & Christian	November 7, 2007	107
2	"The Adventures of Hurley and Frogurt"	Jack Bender	Edward Kitsis & Adam Horowitz	Hurley & Frogurt	November 13, 2007	103
3	"King of the Castle"	Jack Bender	Brian K. Vaughan	Jack & Ben	November 20, 2007	101
4	"The Deal"	Jack Bender	Elizabeth Sarnoff	Michael & Juliet	November 26, 2007	110
5	"Operation: Sleeper"	Jack Bender	Brian K. Vaughan	Jack & Juliet	December 3, 2007	106
6	"Room 23"	Jack Bender	Elizabeth Sarnoff	Ben & Juliet	December 11, 2007	104
7	"Arzt & Crafts"	Jack Bender	Damon Lindelof	Hurley, Jin, Sun, Michael & Arzt	December 17, 2007	112
8	"Buried Secrets"	Jack Bender	Christina M. Kim	Jin, Sun & Michael	December 24, 2007	105
9	"Tropical Depression"	Jack Bender	Carlton Cuse	Michael & Arzt	December 31, 2007	111
10	"Jack, Meet Ethan. Ethan? Jack."	Jack Bender	Damon Lindelof	Jack & Ethan	January 7, 2008	102
11	"Jin Has a Temper-Tantrum on the Golf Course"	Jack Bender	Drew Goddard	Hurley, Jin & Michael	January 14, 2008	108
12	"The Envelope"	Jack Bender	Story by : Damon Lindelof; Teleplay by : J. J. Abrams & Damon Lindelof	Juliet & Amelia	January 21, 2008	109
13	"So It Begins"	Jack Bender	Drew Goddard	Jack, Christian & Vincent	January 28, 2008	113

=== Recap specials ===
This section indexes official specials and recap episodes that were made specifically by the Lost team. Technically, these episodes are clip shows, but to distance them from the negative stereotypes clip shows receive, they are described as recap specials.

No.	Title	Narrated by	Aired between	Original release date	U.S. viewers (millions)
1	"Lost: The Journey"	Brian Cox; Evangeline Lilly & Dominic Monaghan in Australia	"Do No Harm" "The Greater Good"	April 27, 2005	13.75
2	"Destination Lost"	Peter Coyote	"Exodus" "Man of Science, Man of Faith"	September 21, 2005	15.27
3	"Lost: Revelation"	Peter Coyote; Hosted by J. J. Abrams in Australia	"What Kate Did" "The 23rd Psalm"	January 11, 2006	13.52
4	"Lost: Reckoning"	Peter Coyote	"S.O.S." "Two for the Road"	April 26, 2006	11.95
5	"Lost: A Tale of Survival"	Michael Emerson	"Live Together, Die Alone" "A Tale of Two Cities"	September 27, 2006	9.03
6	"Lost Survivor Guide"	Kyle MacLachlan; Hosted by Damon Lindelof & Carlton Cuse	"I Do" "Not in Portland"	February 7, 2007	8.84
7	"Lost: The Answers"	Kyle MacLachlan; Hosted by Damon Lindelof & Carlton Cuse	"Greatest Hits" "Through the Looking Glass"	May 17, 2007	9.12
8	"Lost: Past, Present & Future"	Michael Emerson	"Through the Looking Glass" "The Beginning of the End"	January 31, 2008	13.06
9	"Lost: Destiny Calls"	Doug Hutchison; Hosted by Damon Lindelof & Carlton Cuse	"There's No Place Like Home" "Because You Left"	January 21, 2009	8.48
10	"Lost: The Story of the Oceanic 6"	Nestor Carbonell	"Some Like It Hoth" "The Variable"	April 22, 2009	6.75
11	"Lost: A Journey in Time"	Michael Emerson; Hosted by Damon Lindelof & Carlton Cuse	"Follow the Leader" "The Incident"	May 13, 2009	6.33
12	"Lost: Final Chapter" "Lost: Beginning of the End"	Michael Emerson	"The Incident" "LA X"	February 2, 2010	9.97
13–14	"Lost: The Final Journey"	Titus Welliver	"What They Died For" "The End"	May 23, 2010	9.93
