= Lost: Missing Pieces =

Series of streamed video clips

- A website banner advertisement
- Genre: Drama
- Directed by: Jack Bender
- Starring: Michael Emerson; Matthew Fox; Jorge Garcia; Daniel Dae Kim; Yunjin Kim; Elizabeth Mitchell; Harold Perrineau
- Composer: Michael Giacchino
- Country of origin: United States
- Original language: English
- No. of seasons: 1
- No. of episodes: 13 (list of episodes)

Production
- Executive producers: Damon Lindelof; Carlton Cuse; Barry Jossen; J. J. Abrams; Bryan Burk; Jack Bender; Jeff Pinkner
- Production locations: Oahu, Hawaii
- Cinematography: John Bartley; Michael Bonvillain
- Editor: Robert Florio
- Running time: 1–4 minutes
- Production company: ABC Studios

Original release
- Network: V CAST; ABC.com
- Release: November 7, 2007 – January 28, 2008

Related
- Lost

Lost: Missing Pieces is a series of thirteen video clips ranging in length from one to four minutes that aired during the hiatus between the third and fourth seasons of the television show Lost, from which this series is a spin off. They generally became available to Verizon Wireless users on Mondays from November 2007 to January 2008 and were uploaded onto ABC's website a week later for free streaming. The "mobisodes", or "webisodes", were shot in Honolulu, Hawaii, and produced by the same crew with the same cast as the television series; thus, all content is considered to be canonical. Lost: Missing Pieces were included as special features in the fourth season's 2008 DVD releases.

The project was announced in November 2005 as the Lost Video Diaries; however, production was delayed several times due to contractual restrictions. Lost's writer-producers originally proposed the mobisodes as a self-contained story that would focus on two previously unseen characters of the Lost fictional universe. These characters would be played by actors who were not part of the Screen Actors Guild; however the entertainment guilds refused to support such a project. After months of unsuccessful negotiating, the series was seemingly shelved by ABC. In June 2007, it was announced that the mobisodes, which would be renamed Lost: Missing Pieces, would star the regular characters of Lost in thirteen short video clips unrelated to each other. Twelve scenes were newly shot; one was a deleted scene from the television series. Critical response to Lost: Missing Pieces was mixed. The series was nominated for an Emmy Award in 2008.

== Production ==
=== Conception ===
In November 2005, while the early second season of Lost was airing, The Hollywood Reporter reported that twenty-two mobisodes—each spanning several minutes—were expected to be produced in December for a January 2006 release. Zap2it reported that they would later be present on the second season's DVD set and that six would be exclusive to the DVD. Unlike the television series, it would not be produced by ABC Studios (then named Touchstone Television) and would star non-Screen Actors Guild members; however it would be produced under the oversight of Damon Lindelof and Carlton Cuse, like the television series. In response to fan inquiries about Lost's approximately thirty background characters, the Lost Video Diaries would focus on a self-contained story about two survivors of the crash of Oceanic Flight 815 who had not previously been introduced. The Los Angeles Times confirmed in January 2006–the month scheduled to launch the series–that the mobisodes would be broadcast on V CAST from Verizon Wireless and that each mobisode would span only two minutes. Verizon would ultimately pay ABC $400,000 for the mobisodes.

=== Postponement ===
Production was delayed when the actors, directors and writers guilds refused to support the spin-off. A deal previously unheard of was negotiated in April, which allowed guild members involved to collect residuals. This agreement prompted Lindelof and Cuse to develop a storyline for the Video Diaries that would include Lost's regular characters, although not all of Lost's regular cast signed contracts. According to Touchstone's executive vice president for production Barry Jossen, who would eventually serve as an executive producer on the mobisodes, "They seem to be under the impression that we'll make millions of dollars and they won't". Variety reported that the mobisodes would be produced and aired alongside the third season of Lost. At San Diego Comic-Con in July, Lindelof and Cuse announced that only thirteen mobisodes would be produced. They would run during the third season's winter hiatus, with none saved exclusively for the third season's DVD set. A sneak peek of the Video Diaries was also shown at Comic-Con. The new premise featured Hurley Reyes (played by Jorge Garcia) finding a functional Dharma Initiative video camcorder that had Dharma orientation films on it. In the clip, he films Kate Austen (Evangeline Lilly) and James "Sawyer" Ford (Josh Holloway). During the hiatus, no mobisodes were to be found and clips from upcoming episodes called Lost Moments aired instead, on television and then ABC.com. In January 2007, Wizard discovered that ABC was still negotiating the actors' contracts; thus, no mobisodes had been produced, aside from the Comic-Con teaser. In February, Lost's script coordinator, responding to a fan question, suspected the mobisodes had seemingly been put on hold indefinitely due to an inability to reach a contract agreement.

=== Revamp ===
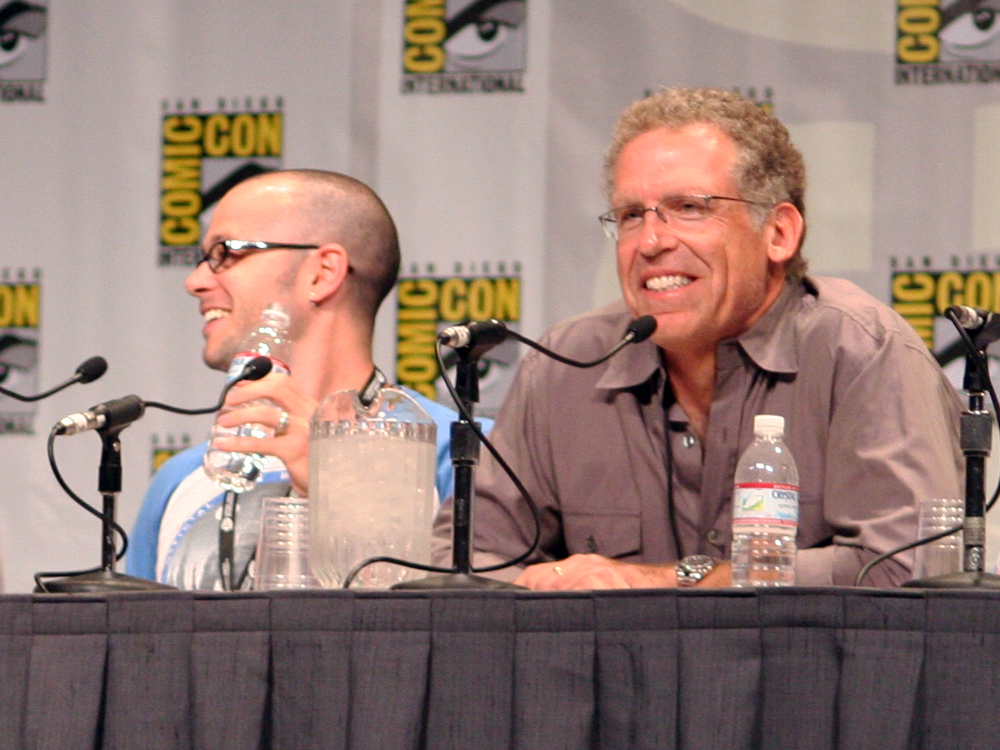
Show runners Lindelof and Cuse unveiled the first footage shot for the mobisodes at San Diego Comic-Con in 2006; this footage (along with its storyline) was eventually scrapped and never made viewable to the general public.

In June, Lindelof and Cuse were interviewed by The Hollywood Reporter and they revealed the ultimate plan for the mobisodes. The mobisodes would air during the hiatus between the third and fourth seasons and would give viewers interesting information that would probably not be found in the show; the average mobisode would only be one and a half minutes long. In the third season, the writers tried to integrate two previously unseen crash survivors named Nikki Fernandez (Kiele Sanchez) and Paulo (Rodrigo Santoro) into the story, but the pair was negatively received for their abrupt appearance and the writers killed them off after seven appearances. Lindelof and Cuse learned from their mistake and decided that the mobisodes would focus on the regular Lost cast. The writers were paid $800 per mobisode, whereas the actors received $425 per mobisode. Actors were contracted to receive more money if the mobisode were reused in another medium.

=== Release ===
In regard to writing, co-executive producer Edward Kitsis said that "sometimes it was a scene we always wanted to do, a scene that never got shot, sometimes it was just something interesting". "Buried Secrets" revisits the first season storylines of sexual tension between Sun-Hwa Kwon (Yunjin Kim) and Michael Dawson (Harold Perrineau) and the mutual detestation between Sun's husband Jin (Daniel Dae Kim) and Michael. These conflicts were going to be further explored in the first season; however, positive fan reaction to Sun and Jin as a couple and good chemistry between the actors playing Michael and Jin led to the abandonment of the love triangle. Reuters announced in November that the mobisodes would premiere that month. This proved to be true, with "The Watch" appearing suddenly to Verizon customers as the first of the Lost: Missing Pieces. A new mobisode would generally become available each Monday and would be released a week later as a free webisode on ABC's website. The Writers Guild of America strike occurred as the mobisodes were released, due to television writers wanting a deal similar to that achieved for Missing Pieces. Filming was completed in late November. The mobisodes were later released as special features on the DVD and Blu-ray sets of Lost: The Complete Fourth Season – The Expanded Experience in the second half of 2008.

=== Crew ===
Although it had not always been the plan, the Missing Pieces were produced by ABC Studios. Executive producer Jack Bender directed each mobisode, with writing duties divided between executive producers Lindelof and Cuse, supervising producer Elizabeth Sarnoff, co-producer Brian K. Vaughan, executive story editor Christina M. Kim, and co-executive producers Drew Goddard, Edward Kitsis, and Adam Horowitz. Other crew members included executive producer Bryan Burk of post-production and co-executive producer Jean Higgins of physical production. "The Envelope"—a deleted scene from the third-season premiere; the only mobisode not to be originally filmed and written for Lost: Missing Pieces—contained additional credits: Jeff Pinkner is an executive producer and executive producer J. J. Abrams is a co-writer.

== Plot ==
=== Cast and characters ===
The Missing Pieces retains many of the cast members from the television series. Perrineau plays Michael, who had not been seen since the second season finale. Matthew Fox plays Jack Shephard, the leader of the castaways and Elizabeth Mitchell portrays his love interest, Juliet Burke. Garcia reprises his role as crash survivor Hurley. Kim and Kim play married couple Jin and Sun. Michael Emerson acts as Ben Linus, the leader of the island residents known as the "Others". Guest stars John Terry, Daniel Roebuck, William Mapother and Julie Adams reprise their roles of Christian Shephard, Leslie Arzt, Ethan Rom, and Amelia, respectively. Emilie de Ravin, who plays Claire Littleton, appears solely in archived footage from the television show. Vincent, a dog who survived the plane crash, is played by the dog Pono. Guest star Sean Whalen makes his first appearance as the crash survivor Neil "Frogurt". While the second season was airing, the writer-producers confirmed in the April 3, 2006, edition of the Official Lost Podcast that Frogurt would appear in the late second season, however, he was merely mentioned once. Frogurt also did not appear in the third season and he became a running gag in the podcast, with Lindelof and Cuse repeatedly claiming that Frogurt would appear in the show. However, Frogurt did appear in the fifth season briefly, but was shot through with flaming arrows shortly after being introduced.

=== Mobisodes ===
"Prod. no." is short for "production code number", which signifies the order that the mobisodes were produced in and appear on DVD and Blu-ray, which is different from the order that they aired in. "Original air date" refers to the original V CAST airdate. Days are in relation to the day of the crash, which is day 1 and September 22, 2004. All mobisodes are newly written and shot, with the exception of "The Envelope", which is a deleted scene from "A Tale of Two Cities" that was shot on August 9 and 11, 2006, a year before the other mobisodes.

No.	Title	Directed by	Written by	Featured character(s)	Original release date	Prod. code
1	"The Watch"	Jack Bender	Carlton Cuse	Jack & Christian	November 7, 2007	107
Years before the crash on the day before Jack's wedding with Sarah, Jack's father Christian apologizes to Jack for not having been as good a father as he could have been. Christian gives Jack a watch that had been passed down to him by his father.
2	"The Adventures of Hurley and Frogurt"	Jack Bender	Edward Kitsis & Adam Horowitz	Hurley & Frogurt	November 13, 2007	103
As Hurley gets wine for his picnic with Libby on day 64, he is confronted by crash survivor Neil, a frozen yogurt salesman nicknamed Frogurt. Frogurt tells Hurley that he also has a crush on Libby and is waiting for Hurley's relationship with her to crumble.
3	"King of the Castle"	Jack Bender	Brian K. Vaughan	Jack & Ben	November 20, 2007	101
Sometime during days 75 to 79 when Jack is living with the Others in the Barracks, Jack and Ben play chess. Ben tells Jack that the island might not let him leave and if he does, Jack may regret it someday.
4	"The Deal"	Jack Bender	Elizabeth Sarnoff	Michael & Juliet	November 26, 2007	110
On day 63, Juliet visits Michael during his captivity with the Others to discuss the necessity to free Walt from the island.
5	"Operation: Sleeper"	Jack Bender	Brian K. Vaughan	Jack & Juliet	December 3, 2007	106
On the night of day 86, Juliet wakes Jack to confess that she has been working with Ben.
6	"Room 23"	Jack Bender	Elizabeth Sarnoff	Ben & Juliet	December 11, 2007	104
Sometime during days 45 to 49, Walt Lloyd is being kept in Room 23. Juliet shows Ben several birds that have died outside Room 23.
7	"Arzt & Crafts"	Jack Bender	Damon Lindelof	Hurley, Jin, Sun, Michael & Arzt	December 17, 2007	112
On day 7, Arzt tries to dissuade some of the crash survivors from following Jack by moving into the caves, that is until he hears the monster and decides to move there himself.
8	"Buried Secrets"	Jack Bender	Christina M. Kim	Jin, Sun & Michael	December 24, 2007	105
Sometime during days 6 to 44, while burying her forged driver's license, Sun is discovered by Michael and they almost kiss.
9	"Tropical Depression"	Jack Bender	Carlton Cuse	Michael & Arzt	December 31, 2007	111
On day 43, Arzt confesses to Michael that he lied about the upcoming monsoon season. He also tells him that he was in Australia to meet someone whom he found through Internet dating, but was rejected.
10	"Jack, Meet Ethan. Ethan? Jack."	Jack Bender	Damon Lindelof	Jack & Ethan	January 7, 2008	102
Sometime during day 4, Ethan approaches Jack and gives him a suitcase of medical supplies, and the two discuss the possibility of Claire delivering her baby on the island. Ethan also tells Jack that his wife and baby died in childbirth.
11	"Jin Has a Temper-Tantrum on the Golf Course"	Jack Bender	Drew Goddard	Hurley, Jin & Michael	January 14, 2008	108
On day 41, while playing a game of golf with Michael and Hurley, Jin shouts in frustration about his problems. Matthew Fox is credited for this mobisode, despite not making an appearance.
12	"The Envelope"	Jack Bender	Story by : Damon Lindelof; Teleplay by : J. J. Abrams & Damon Lindelof	Juliet & Amelia	January 21, 2008	109
On day 1, Juliet almost shows Amelia, a member of the Others' book club, Ben's x-rays. Ben's feelings for Juliet are hinted at.
13	"So It Begins"	Jack Bender	Drew Goddard	Jack, Christian & Vincent	January 28, 2008	113
Just after the crash, on day 1, what appears to be Christian tells Vincent the dog to go and find Jack. The opening scene of the pilot episode is replayed, in which Jack opens his eye and sees Vincent walk by.

== Reception ==
The finale—"So It Begins"—was submitted to the Academy of Television Arts & Sciences for Emmy consideration in the "Special Class: Short-Format Live-Action Entertainment Programs" category. Executive producers Damon Lindelof, Carlton Cuse, and Barry Jossen were successful in receiving a nomination on July 17, 2007; however, they lost to SciFi's Battlestar Galactica: Razor Flashbacks on September 13 at the Creative Arts Emmy Award ceremony of the 60th Primetime Emmy Awards. Douglas Durdan of the Richmond Times-Dispatch described "The Watch" "as unsatisfying as it is satisfying" because the reviewer was unsure of which lines were important or if there were any clues to future episodes hidden among the background. After two mobisodes aired, UGO's Jon Lachonis wrote that "the [first two] mobisodes ... have most fans kvetching about the irrelevancy and down right Lost-lessness of the tidbits that are meant to traverse gaps in the story", "it's way too early to dismiss the mobisodes as a complete waste of time, as Lost has a long history of righting its own wrongs and the best may certainly be yet to come" and "[Frogurt is] the most annoying person on Lost's mystery island". Four mobisodes later, UGO called them "impressive" and said that "they 'look' like full out productions". Larry Dobrow of Advertising Age enjoyed the first six Lost: Missing Pieces, describing them as "all entertaining and professionally rendered" and calling the project "a great friggin' idea". Josh Wigler of Wizard wrote that the Lost: Missing Pieces are "hit or miss in terms of quality and importance. Some episodes, however, shed some excellent light on Lost mythology. ... In terms of flat out fun, it doesn't get much better than 'Jin has a Temper-Tantrum on the Golf Course' ... featuring a frustrated Jin screaming to the high heavens after botching an easy putt against Michael. Unnecessary, yes. Hysterical, absolutely."

MSNBC's Ree Hines reviewed the first seven Missing Pieces. He wrote that "'The Watch' is basically pointless", "the humor [of 'The Adventures of Hurley and Frogurt'] doesn't work" and "Operation: Sleeper" was deemed "the most useless of the webisodes". Hines said that "King of the Castle" "almost satisfies ... due to ... Ben's deadpan dastardly presence" and "Room 23" is the most promising of the first half of the series. Hines concluded that "the creators fill gaps that don't need filling. The installments fail to form a cohesive stand-alone arc, leaving viewers with little more than a series of fragmented scenes, presumably no better than those left on the cutting-room floor."

Chris Carabott of IGN reviewed most of Lost: Missing Pieces and has given each a rating out of ten. After four mobisodes aired, he remarked that "these vignettes feel like your average deleted scene—removed for a good reason"; however, no mobisode received a score less than 6.5. "The Watch" scored a 7.5 and was called "touching" because Jack and his father have rarely been seen getting along in Lost. "The Adventures of Hurley and Frogurt" was given a 6.5 and described as "a funny little moment" and "tragic", in regard to Libby's death. "King of the Castle" received an 8.5. Carabott said that it was well written, "a great performance from [Fox and Emerson]" and worthy of appearing on television. Carabott celebrated Michael's return in "The Deal", but the reviewer noted that "The Deal" "doesn't reveal anything new or exciting at all". "Operation: Sleeper" was rated as a 7.5, as was "Buried Secrets". "Room 23" got an 8 and was described as "definitely the type of new content that we are looking for. It's something that won't be missed by regular viewers but gives a little more insight into the nature of events on the island". "Arzt and Crafts" also got an 8 and was said to have "a cleverly devised title" and was "packed with a healthy amount of humor". "Tropical Depression" received an 8.5, with Carabott calling it "rather pointless ... but cute nonetheless". "Jack, Meet Ethan. Ethan? Jack" scored an 8 and Mapother's acting skills were commended. "Jin Has a Temper-Tantrum on the Golf Course" was deemed "hilarious" and "one of [Lost's] funniest ... moments" and worthy of a 7.5. "The Envelope" was given a 6.5, and "So It Begins" was given a 9—the highest score of any mobisode—and was described as "a shocking new look at the Christian Shephard who appeared to Jack".

Oscar Dahl of BuddyTV reviewed each mobisode. "The Watch" was called "a fun couple minutes of character work", but "relatively worthless". "The Adventures of Hurley and Frogurt" was thought to be better than "The Watch". "King of the Castle" was reviewed better than the previous two mobisodes and the reviewer noted that "it's a testament to ... Fox and ... Emerson's acting abilities that [it] is so intense". "The Deal" was said to be even better than "King of the Castle". While Dahl "always like[s] what Juliet brings to the table", he thought that "Operation: Sleeper" "serves little purpose". "Room 23" was called the "best mobisode ever". In regard to "Arzt and Crafts", Dahl wrote that "Lindelof wrote this mobisode ... and as a result ... it has the best dialogue of any mobisode so far". He commented that "Tropical Depression" is "not totally superfluous, though the new information isn't very enlightening". Dahl "liked" "Jack, Meet Ethan. Ethan? Jack", but decided "that it's not [Lindelof]'s best work". Dahl wrote that "Jin Has a Temper-Tantrum on the Golf Course" is "a nice little scene", but the reviewer pointed out an inaccuracy in the scene's golf gameplay. When reviewing "The Envelope", Dahl wrote that "The people over at Lost have cheated a little bit ... [but] it's still a pretty cool deleted scene". After seeing "So It Begins", Dahl was "not entirely sure what to think" because the reviewer liked "showing the moments before the pilot began" and "doing a mobisode from Vincent's perspective, but adding a supposed-to-be-dead Christian to the mix is confusing".

Ryan McGee of Zap2it also reviewed every mobisode. "The Watch" was described as "anticlimactic". "The Adventures of Hurley and Frogurt" was described as "a little ... lacking", but McGee wrote that "'King of the Castle' proves that brevity is the soul of awesome, with a tense, information-rich two-and-a-half minutes that tingled my Spidey-esque mythology sense the entire time". "The Deal" was received less favourably than the previous installment McGee wrote that "Room 23" was "short but sweet". "Arzt and Crafts" was called "a weak-ish entry" and it was noted that "not everything Lost does turns into Dharma-laced gold, sadly". "Buried Secrets" was described as mediocre. In the review for "Tropical Depression", McGee commented that "It's just not good. At all." and compared its quality to the episode "Stranger in a Strange Land" and the character Paulo, both of which were negatively received by fans and critics. "Jack, Meet Ethan. Ethan? Jack" had "return[ed Lost: Missing Pieces] to compelling form", however the title was called "clunky". After watching "So It Begins", McGee wrote that it is "a mobisode so vital, so important that I can't believe that ABC didn't bother to air this [online] before the start of Season 4".
