= Everybody Hates Hugo =

- Lost episode
- Hugo has a dream where he surprisingly sees Jin. Here you can also see Walt being plastered on the milk carton Hugo is holding in a missing poster
- Episode no.: Season 2 Episode 4
- Directed by: Alan Taylor
- Written by: Edward Kitsis; Adam Horowitz
- Production code: 204
- Original air date: October 12, 2005
- Running time: 43 minutes

Guest appearances
- L. Scott Caldwell as Rose Nadler; Sam Anderson as Bernard Nadler; Lillian Hurst as Carmen Reyes; Marguerite Moreau as Starla; DJ Qualls as Johnny; Billy Ray Gallion as Randy Nations; Kimberley Joseph as Cindy Chandler; Raj K. Bose as Shop clerk

Episode chronology
← Previous "Orientation"	Next → "...And Found"
- Lost season 2

"Everybody Hates Hugo" is the fourth episode of the second season of the American drama television series Lost, and the show's 29th episode overall. The episode was written by Edward Kitsis and Adam Horowitz, and directed by Alan Taylor. It first aired in the United States on October 12, 2005, on ABC.

In this episode, flashbacks reveal why Hurley is hesitant at his new job of distributing food found in the newly discovered Swan station. Meanwhile, a few castaways become worried that the raft sent by them for rescue may have not gone as far as they hoped. Jack and Sayid explore the hatch, while Sawyer, Jin, and Michael find out that their captors are from the tail section of the plane.

== Plot ==
=== Flashbacks ===
Following Hugo "Hurley" Reyes's (Jorge Garcia) discovery of his winning lottery numbers, Hurley keeps his win a secret, and quits his job at a fast food restaurant along with his friend Johnny (DJ Qualls). The pair enjoy themselves by pulling a prank on their former boss, and going to a record store where Hurley asks out his crush, Starla (Marguerite Moreau). Hurley asks Johnny to promise that they will never change, and Johnny does so. Johnny pulls into a local gas station to buy some beer, but notices news crews talking to the attendant. When the clerk loudly points out Hurley as the buyer of the winning lottery ticket, Johnny's stunned expression clearly reveals that, despite his promise, everything has changed.

=== On the island ===
In the Swan station, Hurley struggles with the task of food rationing. Charlie (Dominic Monaghan) asks Hurley if the bunker contains food, specifically peanut butter for Claire (Emilie de Ravin), but Hurley will not answer him. Hurley decides to enlist Rose (L. Scott Caldwell) to help him take inventory. At one point, Hurley has a strange dream, in which Jin (Daniel Dae Kim) tells Hurley, in English, that "everything is going to change." Hurley becomes less and less certain of his ability to ration the food in a manner that keeps everyone happy. He attempts to quit, but John Locke (Terry O'Quinn) refuses to permit it. Hurley then prepares to blow up the pantry with dynamite, but Rose intervenes. He explains that the food, newfound wealth to the survivors, will change everything and everyone will come to hate him, just as things changed when everyone knew he won the lottery; however Rose talks him out of his plan. Later, Hurley informs Jack (Matthew Fox) of his decision to give all the food away, arguing that the food stores do not amount to very much when divided among all the survivors. The food is distributed freely and the survivors enjoy a feast. Everyone appreciates Hurley's decision, including Charlie, who gives his benefactor a hug of reconciliation.

Sawyer (Josh Holloway), Michael (Harold Perrineau) and Jin learn that their captors are survivors from the tail section of Oceanic 815 and are taken to a DHARMA Initiative station, which they use for sanctuary. A woman named Libby (Cynthia Watros) says that there were 23 survivors from the tail section of the plane, although very few remain.

Meanwhile, the bottle of messages from the raft, on which Michael, Sawyer, Jin and Walt were travelling, washes ashore. Claire and Shannon (Maggie Grace) give it to Sun (Yunjin Kim), Jin's wife, and she opts to bury the bottle on the beach. In the hatch, Jack and Sayid (Naveen Andrews) inspect the mysterious concrete barricade blocking what appears to be a corridor to another section of the bunker. They discover that the barrier is very thick and that the corridor is also blocked on the foundation level. Later, Jack and Kate (Evangeline Lilly) share a moment of sexual tension when she exits the shower wearing only a towel.

== Production ==
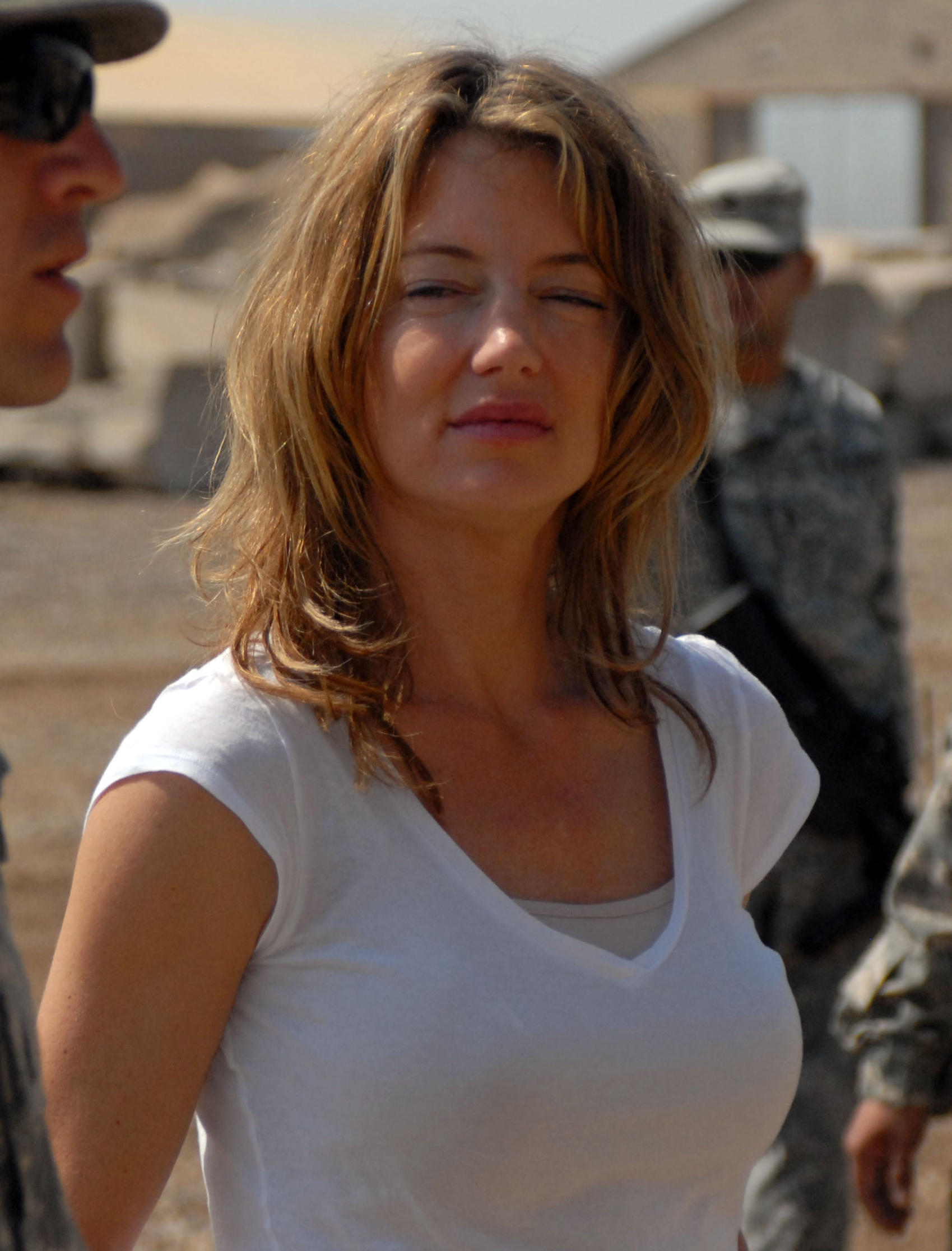
Cynthia Watros did not think that she was going to be cast as Libby.

"Everybody Hates Hugo" was the only episode of the series directed by Alan Taylor. Taylor had previously directed episodes of The Sopranos and Sex and the City. The episode was written by Edward Kitsis and Adam Horowitz, the pair had previously written the episode "Born to Run".

The character of Libby, played by Cynthia Watros, was introduced in this episode. Libby had been written to be in her late 40s or early 50s. Jennifer Jason Leigh was approached to play the part, but it went to Watros instead. When Watros auditioned for the part of Libby, she did not think that she would end up being cast. Once she was, Watros and her twin daughters immediately moved from Los Angeles to Hawaii. Bernard is also introduced in this episode. As Rose is black, the producers thought the audience would expect Rose's husband to also be black, and made Bernard white to surprise the audience. They expected the audience to assume Mr. Eko (Adewale Akinnuoye-Agbaje), the only black man in the tail-section survivors, was Bernard. L. Scott Caldwell, Rose's portrayer, was unaware of their plans and had been picturing her own husband, a tall black man, when playing the scenes. When she found out Bernard was white she was surprised, but not shocked.

This was the first time in which Raj K. Bose, who played the shop clerk, was credited. Bose had been a background actor on the series, playing a crash survivor and a flight attendant. Bose was cast to play the role of Sanjay in the first season episode "Born to Run", but was forced to give up the role after he had to teach a marketing class at the University of Phoenix. Casting agent Margaret Doversola later asked Bose to audition for the part of the shop clerk and he got the part.

For the flashback scene at the gas station, the crew rented out a 7-Eleven for a day. When Hurley drove in, the van was actually being pushed instead of driven to eliminate any sound from the vehicle. However, every time the van was pushed it would stall or the timing would be off. Once that problem had been solved, it started to rain, but eventually it stopped and the crew was able to get the shots before ending shooting at midnight. Hurley's dream scene was shot in the Hawaii Film Studio, where the hatch had been constructed.

== Reception ==
According to the Nielsen ratings system, "Everybody Hates Hugo" was viewed by an average of 21.7 million viewers. The episode achieved a 9.4/22 in the key 18–49 demographic, meaning that 9.4% of all 18- to 49-year-olds watched the episode, along with 22% of all 18- to 49-year-olds watching television at the time of the broadcast. "Everybody Hates Hugo" was the most watched episode of the night for the fourth week in a row, and the second most watched episode of the week. It also performed better than the previous episode in the key 18–49 demographic, and earned its second highest ever rating among teens 12-17.

Film Fodder's Mac Slocum said that he was glad that the show "downshifted this week into a far more reasonable gear". He felt that an upside to the downshifting was the "return to characters", and thought that there was no better representation of character than Hurley. Keith McDuffee of TV Squad wrote that although he heard "that this episode would be mostly filler", he did not "think that's true". He liked the fact that there was more revelations of Hurley's background, and enjoyed the "awesome reveals from the other half of downed Oceanic 815". TelevisionWithoutPity.com graded the episode with a "B-".
