= Lost: The Journey =

- Lost episode
- Episode no.: Season 1 clip show
- Original air date: April 27, 2005

Guest appearance
- Narrated by Brian Cox

Episode chronology
← Previous "Do No Harm"	Next → "The Greater Good"

"Lost: The Journey" is a clip show narrated by Brian Cox during the first season of Lost. It originally aired on April 27, 2005, on ABC, between the 20th and 21st episodes of the season. The special was repeated in the US on May 21, between the two-part episode, "Exodus", in build-up to the May 25 finale. The special was narrated by Lost actors Evangeline Lilly and Dominic Monaghan in Australia.

The show was the first attempt to present in a linear fashion the struggles of the survivors of Oceanic Flight 815 before and after they became stranded on a mysterious island. ABC intended the special to "bring new viewers up to date -- but which current viewers will also find illuminating."

In anticipation, the TV critic for the St. Louis Post Dispatch noted that unlike usual clip shows, "the hour-long recap is, for once, not just a cheap way to stretch out a hit show. This time, it's a public service."

== Purpose ==
Like ABC's serial drama Desperate Housewives which premiered weeks after Lost, the progressively complex nature of the continuing storyline required viewers to keep tuning in weekly, a potential impediment to new viewership. This became a source of concern for the network, which found that individual episodes had a limited repeatability.

While the first nine episodes of the freshman season were broadcast in weekly order, the following ones were shown in blocks of two to four episodes, with repeats or other series in their scheduled timeslot. "The Journey" was broadcast after the final such break of three weeks. During the second season, the fans and show's producers grew increasingly unhappy with the scheduling, leading to an announcement by ABC that the third-season would be broadcast without repeats, in two blocks.

In addition to the traditional broadcast, "Lost: The Journey", following the special "Sorting Out the Dirty Laundry", became the first primetime shows streamed from ABC.com. According to ABC's senior VP for business development, Bruce Gersh, "Placing these two specials literally at the fingertips of internet users is a great 'first' for ABC.com, and an exciting way to introduce new viewers to two of the most talked about new series of the year while also feeding the appetite of current fans."

== Ratings ==
According to the Nielsen ratings, "Lost: The Journey" won its Wednesday timeslot by 4.7 million viewers (a total of 13.7 million) over CBS's 60 Minutes Wednesday, ranking first in all critical demographics for the night, against other networks' original broadcasts.

== DVD releases ==
On the US release of the season one DVD boxed set, "Lost: The Journey" was cut due to space, but was made available on a bonus disc, when purchased at Best Buy. In Australia, it was reportedly included as episode 21 on the first season box set. Belgium's VT4 network released the episode on a promotional DVD under the title "Lost Special: The Journey, Samenvatting van Seizoen 1."
