= The Long Con =

- Lost episode
- Episode no.: Season 2 Episode 13
- Directed by: Roxann Dawson
- Written by: Leonard Dick; Steven Maeda
- Production code: 213
- Original air date: February 8, 2006
- Running time: 43 minutes

Guest appearances
- Kim Dickens as Cassidy Phillips; Beth Broderick as Diane Janssen; Kevin Dunn as Gordy; Finn Armstrong as Arthur; Richard Cavanna as Peter

Episode chronology
| ← Previous "Fire + Water" | Next → "One of Them" |
- Lost season 2

"The Long Con" is the 38th episode of Lost. It is the 13th episode of the second season. The episode was directed by Roxann Dawson, and written by Leonard Dick and Steven Maeda. It first aired on February 8, 2006, on ABC. The character of James "Sawyer" Ford is featured in the episode's flashbacks.

== Plot summary ==
=== Flashbacks ===
Sawyer attempts to con divorced woman Cassidy. While getting dressed, Sawyer "accidentally" opens a briefcase filled with fake cash bundles made from newspaper. Cassidy sees through the con immediately. Claiming that she did not get a significant settlement in the proceedings, an intrigued Cassidy asks Sawyer to teach her how to con someone.

The two scheme a jewelry con by overpricing fake goods, and con two men at a gas station. They perpetrate various cons over the ensuing months. Then Cassidy asks if he can teach her how to pull off a "long con", and reveals that she did indeed receive a settlement of $600,000 in her divorce. Sawyer is later at a diner (his waitress is Diane, Kate's mother), eating with Gordy, his partner. It is revealed that Sawyer was planning to con Cassidy out of her money, but wants to back out due to his feelings for her. Gordy threatens Sawyer's and Cassidy's lives if the con is not completed.

Sawyer returns to the house and tells Cassidy to run because Gordy is going to kill them, and points to a car outside. He reveals that the "long con" is Cassidy herself, and that he always knew about her money, but Gordy will kill them because Sawyer does not want to steal it. He sends her off with the money, packed in a bag and goes to the car, which turns out to be empty. He then returns to the house and retrieves the real money, which he concealed while tricking Cassidy.

=== On the Island ===
Jack and Locke secure all the weapons, medicine, and Virgin Mary statues in the storeroom. Jack puts the six guns in the U.S. Marshal's suitcase, along with the key, in the gun cache. The two agree that no one else should be privy to the combination, and that each one will not gain access without the other being present.

Sawyer remarks that he and Charlie are now the two most hated people on the island. Charlie replies that Sawyer ought to be more concerned about Jack ransacking his tent. Sawyer confronts Jack, who explains that he is simply returning the pain killers which Sawyer stole. Sawyer replies that the pain killers were actually stolen from his "stash" while he was on the raft. Sawyer also points out to Kate that Jack is now confiding in Ana Lucía rather than her.

Ana Lucía asks Jack if Locke gave him the combination for the guns, and he responds that he did. Ana feels that the survivors "aren't scared enough" and that they all feel they are safe. Ana then asks for the combination, but when Jack hesitates, Ana says she was just kidding.

While Kate is reading to Sawyer, he mentions the army that Jack and Ana Lucía are forming. Meanwhile, to assuage Sayid's grief over Shannon's death, Hurley attempts to connect with Sayid, revealing that he went to Rose and Bernard's tent, and got their radio from the Arrow Hatch. Hurley also has discovered that Bernard was the one who picked up Boone's transmission from the Nigerian Drug Plane. He asks Sayid if he can boost the power somehow to help them send another signal, but Sayid says that it would not work.

While Sun is working in her garden, someone puts a burlap bag over her head, her hands are tied together and she is dragged away. Sawyer and Kate hear her screams. They run to her and find her unconscious. They bring her back to camp, and the castaways fear the Others are back. Jack determines that Sun will be fine. Jin demands a gun to seek revenge. Despite Jack's wishes to wait for Sun to regain consciousness before an investigation, Sawyer and Kate return to the site of Sun's attack for an inspection. They find the bag, which is a different make from the one used by "Mr. Friendly" on Kate. They deduce that one of the survivors may have attempted the kidnapping. Kate suspects Ana Lucía, who she thinks wants to instill fear in the survivors so they will form an army against the Others.

Kate expresses her concerns to Jack, and asks Sawyer to alert Locke that Jack is coming for the guns. Locke decides to move the guns so Jack and Jin cannot get at them. While hiding the arsenal, Locke leaves Sawyer to "push the button". Jack enters the hatch in search of a gun, but finds the safe empty. Sawyer taunts him and tosses him the pain killers which Jack took from his tent. When Jack confronts Locke on the beach about the missing weaponry, Locke defends his actions by pointing out that Jack was about to break their agreement. During this dispute, shots ring out and Sawyer appears, wielding an automatic rifle. Sawyer reveals that the incident was a "long con" to seize the guns and declare himself the "new sheriff in town". Unknown to the rest, the attacker in the garden (as well as the one who tracked Locke to the hiding place) was Charlie, who agreed to help Sawyer in order to humiliate Locke. Sawyer offers him one of the Virgin Mary statues, but he refuses it.

Sayid brings Hurley the radio, along with a transmission amplifier to boost the signal. They first pick up Rousseau's distress transmission, and then they pick up a radio transmission of Glenn Miller's "Moonlight Serenade". Sayid explains that due to radio waves bouncing off the ionosphere, shortwave radio signals can potentially travel thousands of miles. Sayid says it could be coming from any place, to which Hurley replies "...or any time".
