= Born to Run (Lost) =

- Lost episode
- Kate looks at an injured and unresponsive Tom Brennan after the two are involved in a car accident while trying to evade police
- Episode no.: Season 1 Episode 22
- Directed by: Tucker Gates
- Story by: Javier Grillo-Marxuach
- Teleplay by: Edward Kitsis; Adam Horowitz
- Production code: 120
- Original air date: May 11, 2005
- Running time: 44 minutes

Guest appearances
- Mackenzie Astin as Tom Brennan; Daniel Roebuck as Dr. Leslie Arzt; Beth Broderick as Diane Janssen; Anosh Yaqoob as Sanjay; Tamara Lynch as Nurse; Scott Rogers as Wheeler

Episode chronology
← Previous "The Greater Good"	Next → "Exodus"
- Lost season 1

"Born to Run" is the 22nd episode of the first season of Lost. It was directed by Tucker Gates, written by Edward Kitsis and Adam Horowitz, and based on a story by Javier Grillo-Marxuach. It first aired on May 11, 2005, on ABC. The character Kate Austen (Evangeline Lilly) is featured in the episode's flashbacks. The title Born to Run is an allusion to the Bruce Springsteen song and album of the same names.

== Plot ==
=== Flashbacks ===
Kate is changing the license plate of her car, dyeing her hair, taking a shower, as well as claiming a letter under the alias Joan Hart. She returns later to her hometown to visit her dying mother and, while there, meets up with her now-married ex-boyfriend Tom Brennan (Mackenzie Astin), who is a doctor at the hospital. The two decide to dig up a lunch box time capsule that they buried back in 1989. Among its contents are Tom's toy airplane and a tape recording that they made to mark the occasion of the burial. Later, with Tom's help, Kate is able to be alone with her mother (Beth Broderick) and apologize. Far from appeased, however, her mother begins to scream for help. Kate flees, knocking out a policeman before running into Tom, who gives her the keys to his car and climbs into it. When the police try to block their exit from the hospital, Kate implores Tom to leave, but he refuses. As the police open fire at the speeding vehicle, Kate rams theirs out of the way before crashing into another. With the car brought finally to a halt, Kate looks over at Tom and finds him dead. Distraught and left with no choice but to flee, Kate climbs out of the car and runs.

=== On the Island ===
Charlie Pace (Dominic Monaghan) and Claire discuss the fame that awaits them if and when they are rescued. A survivor named Dr. Leslie Arzt (Daniel Roebuck), a science teacher, suddenly announces that the monsoon season is coming, where the winds go south, and that they have to go north to reach shipping lanes. He also exclaims that the raft must leave immediately so the forces of nature won't turn against them. This hits everyone hard. Thus, Michael Dawson (Harold Perrineau) hurries to finish the raft, and Kate seeks a spot. Michael refuses, reiterating the fact that all places have already been booked. After a conversation with Sawyer (Josh Holloway), however, he reconsiders, reasoning in spite of their deal that Sawyer has little grasp on the art of sailing and will be of little assistance once the voyage is underway. Sawyer storms off to confront Kate, whom he rightly perceives as his biggest threat, telling her that he knows why she wants to be on the raft: she wants to escape capture from authorities in the outside world.

Sayid Jarrah (Naveen Andrews) and Jack Shephard (Matthew Fox) meet John Locke (Terry O'Quinn) at the hatch. Surprised at what he finds there, Jack asks Locke why he failed to tell anyone about it. There follows a brief confrontation between the two leaders, after which Jack states his belief that the hatch ought to be opened. This prompts a furiously nervous response from Sayid, who fears its content, and who actually brought Jack along to dissuade Locke from the idea, but the matter is left unsettled.

Michael suddenly becomes ill while working with Jin (Daniel Dae Kim). Having returned from the hatch, and summoned by an urgent Kate, Jack examines him and searches for the cause of the illness. He eventually discovers some partially dissolved drugs in a water bottle from which Michael has been drinking. Upon learning of this, the afflicted immediately suspects Sawyer, but, in short order, Kate also is suspected, leading Jack to confront her about it. She denies any involvement, apparently offended that Jack should think her capable of such a thing. Walt Lloyd (Malcolm David Kelley), meanwhile, assures Locke that he is not responsible either, fearing that he suspects him after his earlier sabotage of the raft. When Locke touches his arm to assure him that his fears are unfounded, Walt becomes frightened and, despite having no prior knowledge of it, begs Locke not to open "it"; presumably, the hatch.

Sawyer walks up to the recovering Michael and offers him a bottle of antacid. Angry at his ostensible cheek, Michael kicks him off the raft. Furious, and finally tested beyond the bounds that his patience allows, Sawyer exposes Kate's criminalism to everyone present (significantly, Sun is not present). Snatching her bag, Sawyer empties it to reveal that Kate has stolen the passport of Joanna, the woman who drowned in "White Rabbit", in a bid to forge her identity. Kate reluctantly admits the truth that she was the person in the marshal's custody.

As the raft is hurried toward completion, Jack walks up to Sun (Yunjin Kim) and confronts her about the poisoning. Sun admits that she is the one responsible, explaining that she wanted to keep Jin from leaving. Jack has already reasoned that, with Jin and Michael working in such close proximity, it is easy for them to mix up their water bottles. He sees no reason to reveal her indiscretion to the others, though, and promises her that he will not do so. Later, in a private conversation with Kate, Sun swears not to tell anyone that the drugging was her idea. Her reasoning is flawed, however, for she believes that Kate's idea was hatched for the sole purpose of helping her.

That night, Kate and Sawyer say farewell and make something like amends, while Walt confesses to his father that he is responsible for the fire that destroyed the first raft. He explains that he wanted to stay on the island. Michael, surprised, says that they can still stay behind, but Walt insists that they leave.

== Trivia ==
In the Lost: Missing Pieces mobisode "Tropical Depression", Dr. Arzt admits and apologizes to Michael that he made up the entire monsoon thing because he wanted the raft to leave immediately.

The voice message played back by Kate and Tom was recorded on August 15, 1989, in American date format, 8/15. This relates to the Oceanic Flight 815 and two of the Numbers. 8 and 15 are both a part of the island's mysterious numbers: 4 8 15 16 23 42. Beth Broderick was on Sabrina the Teenage Witch which starred Melissa Joan Hart on ABC during the 90s and Kate's alias of Joan Hart is a reference to said show.

== Reception ==
This episode gained 17.10 million viewers when it first aired.
