= Leonard Dick =

Canadian screenwriter

Leonard Dick is a television writer and producer who writes for The Good Wife.

Leonard was born in Toronto, Ontario, and attended high school at Upper Canada College, where he was elected head of Howard's House, and thus served on the Board of Stewards. He graduated from Harvard University with both a BA and MBA.

He worked on the first two seasons of the ABC television series Lost, garnering him a Writers Guild of America (WGA) Award, as well as an Emmy for Outstanding Drama. Dick and the writing staff won the WGA Award for Best Dramatic Series at the February 2006 ceremony for their work on the first and second seasons of Lost. They were nominated for the WGA Award for Best Dramatic Series again at the February 2007 ceremony for their work on the second and third seasons. Dick was later a writer and supervising producer for House, where he shared three nominations for Outstanding Drama at the Emmys, as well as a writer, co-executive producer, and executive producer for The Good Wife, spanning more 129 episodes, receiving another Outstanding Drama Series Emmy nomination.

Other series he has written for include The Mentalist, Fastlane, Hack, Family Law, and the Fox sketch comedy Mad TV.

== Television credits ==
- Lost (2004) TV Series
  - 1x17: ...In Translation
  - 1x21: The Greater Good
  - 2x02: Adrift
  - 2x08: Collision
  - 2x13: The Long Con
  - 2x19: S.O.S.
- House (2004) TV Series
  - 3x11: Words and Deeds
  - 3x23 The Jerk
  - 4x02 The Right Stuff
  - 4x12 Don't Ever Change
  - 5x20 Simple Explanation
