= D.O.C. (Lost episode) =

- Lost episode
- Episode no.: Season 3 Episode 18
- Directed by: Frederick E.O. Toye
- Written by: Edward Kitsis; Adam Horowitz
- Production code: 318
- Original air date: April 25, 2007
- Running time: 43 minutes

Guest appearances
- Andrew Divoff as Mikhail Bakunin; Byron Chung as Woo-Jung Paik; Marsha Thomason as Naomi; Alexis Rhee as Jin’s mother

Episode chronology
← Previous "Catch-22"	Next → "The Brig"
- Lost season 3

"D.O.C." is the 18th episode of the third season of Lost. It aired on April 25, 2007, and is the 67th episode of the series. The episode was written by Edward Kitsis and Adam Horowitz and directed by Frederick E.O. Toye. The character of Sun-Hwa Kwon, played by Yunjin Kim, is featured in the episode’s flashbacks; she discovers that the island’s mysterious powers threaten the life of expectant mothers, and is then offered help by Juliet Burke (Elizabeth Mitchell). The title of the episode refers to the “Date Of Conception” of Sun’s unborn baby.

== Plot ==
=== Flashbacks ===
A newly married Sun is visited by a woman who claims to know information about her husband’s parentage: she tells her that Jin was birthed by a prostitute, and threatens to reveal this secret to the world of Sun’s high society if she doesn’t receive 100,000 dollars.

Sun tries to push her husband into talking about his past, but he remains secretive and his words are contradictory. Therefore, she decides to visit Jin’s father, a man who she thought was long dead. Mr. Kwon is pleased to meet his newly wed son’s wife, and confirms the identity of Jin’s mother, a sex worker who gave up the baby right after his birth. He asks Sun to keep the secret, to spare Jin the shame.

Sun asks her rich father for the blackmail money. Sun’s father, who senses that the request revolves somehow around Jin, accepts to help her daughter, but declares that he’ll involve Jin in his illegal business from that day on, as a form of compensation. Sun then meets the blackmailer, and tells her that she knows the woman is Jin’s mother herself. After giving her the money, Sun remarks on her family’s power and criminal connections, threatening the blackmailer into going away forever.

=== On the island ===
Sun is cautious of Jack, fearing that he may have shifted his allegiance to the Others after his return, and that they may be planning to take her unborn baby (like they tried to do with Claire’s). She is then confronted by Juliet, who reveals herself as the Others’ fertility doctor. She explains that pregnant women on the island are destined to die before their last trimester. Juliet wants to find out the baby’s date of conception, claiming that Sun has a better chance to live if the child was conceived before the plane crash on the island. She brings Sun to the Others’ medical facility station, where Sun admits to Juliet about her infidelity prior to the flight. Worried that the baby may not be Jin’s, Sun states that she’s destined to suffer regardless of the ultrasound test’s results.

Juliet is then able to confirm that the baby was conceived on the island. Sun begins to cry, but also claims to be happy, and thanks Juliet. After Sun leaves the facility, Juliet uses a tape recorder to register a message for Ben: she informs him about Sun’s condition and reveals that she’s going to take samples from other women.

Meanwhile, Desmond, Charlie, Hurley and Jin are assisting the woman who parachuted on the island in the previous episode. To their surprise, Mikhail Bakunin arrives on the scene, having apparently survived from the electromagnetic shock that knocked him unconscious. The flight 815 survivors compel Bakunin to medicate the woman, who suffers from a branch penetrating her chest. After the parachuter appears safe, they reluctantly let Mikhail go. When the woman wakes up, she reveals to Hurley that in the outside world the crashed Oceanic Airlines plane was already found, along with every passenger’s body.

== Production ==
"D.O.C." was the first and only episode directed by Frederick E.O. Toye. It was written by Edward Kitsis and Adam Horowitz, on their ninth collaboration for the show.

As usual, the scenes on the beach (the survivors camp) were shot at Oahu's Papa'iloa Beach, while the island scenes were actually filmed at the Waialua Mauka Ranches. The filming location of Jin's father's fishing dock is the same location (in Hawaii) that the submarine was docked at. The location is the fish pond at the Molii Gardens on the Kualoa Ranch.

== Reception ==
Reviewer Chris Carabott of IGN rated the episode with an 8.5 out of 10. He wrote that Yunjin Kim "delivers a poignant performance as Sun". However, he also commented negatively on the episode’s flashbacks: “unfortunately [they] stunted the pacing of this episode and as interesting as the story was it once again felt out of place with what was happening on the island”.

In 2019, Josh Wigler of The Hollywood Reporter placed the episode in 96th place in a ranking of every episode of the series. He wrote of D.O.C.: “An otherwise average episode is elevated by Yunjin Kim’s moving performance as Sun, seeing images of her unborn child for the very first time.”

Writing for Slant Magazine, Andrew Dignan praised the episode, saying that "the intersection of the [flashbacks and present developments] complement one another, lending thematic weight to scenes both on and off the island."
