= Production code number =

Identifier of an episode of a TV series

A production code number, also known as the production code (PC) or episode code, is an alphanumeric designation used to uniquely identify episodes within a television series. As each studio can freely generate its own PC format, it cannot be used universally to identify the show and episode.

While, in general, television episodes are filmed in the order they are intended to be aired in, there are circumstances in which this is not the case. In these instances, the production codes can be useful in determining the writers' original intentions.

Some "stand-alone" shows, such as The Simpsons, Law & Order or SpongeBob SquarePants, may air episodes in radically different order from how they are produced, because character development and continuity are not major aspects of production. The airing order may in the end be decided by the network, based on ratings, sweeps months, or other networks' competition.

Other, more serialized series, like Desperate Housewives, The Blacklist, or Riverdale, will air all of their episodes in order.

In some rare cases, shows will film episodes out of order to accommodate guest stars' schedules, or to work around main stars' movie schedules. A good example of this is The X-Files, which filmed episodes out of order in its fifth and sixth seasons to accommodate the shooting schedules of main stars Gillian Anderson and David Duchovny.

== Format examples ==
- General format for network and cable shows produced by both CBS Studios and Universal Television is SYEE, where S is the variable-letter show identifier, Y is the season number and E is a two-digit episode number during that season. The production code is only used on both CBS and NBC.
- Fox Entertainment Studios format for free-to-air network produced shows is YEE, where Y is the season identifier and E is a two-digit episode number during that season for every Fox show.
- The CW Studios format for Nexstar Media Group's international and acquired series is SEE, where S is the season identifier and E is a two-digit episode number during that season.
- 20th Television format for free-to-air network produced shows is YSSSEE, where Y is the season identifier from 1 to Z, S is the three-letter show identifier and E is a two-digit episode number during that season. Off-network produced shows after May 2011 is SSSYEE, previous codes were only numerical values in the form of S-Y-E. These are burned in on the end copyright slate; the letters I, O, Q, and U are not allowed to be used in the production code; however, The Simpsons defeated this rule in late 2020 as its 32nd season predominantly uses the letter Q, because it has already cycled through every other digit.
- Warner Bros. format for picked up weekly produced shows is TYY.SSSEE, where T is the Warner Bros. identifier, Y is the show identifier, S is the season identifier and E is a two-digit episode number during that season, which was burned in on the end copyright slate.
- Paramount Pictures format for weekly produced shows is SSSSS-EEE, where S is a five-digit show number and E is a three-digit episode number. Daily produced shows use SE, where S is the variable-letter show identifier and E is a variable sequential-digit episode count. Only the episode portion is used on internal marketing material and feed slates.
- The Price Is Right, which is from RTL Group's Fremantle brand, has used in daytime episodes a code WWWEx, where W is the week, E is the episode number for that week (1 of 5), and "D" for daytime episodes from September 4, 1972, to May 24, 1996, "K" for daytime episodes from May 27, 1996, to November 23, 2022 (after the 1,000th week of production), and "L" for daytime episodes after the 2,000th week of production (episodes produced since October 3, 2022, broadcast since December 5, 2022)
- A number of Canadian, Australian, French, Korean, Italian, Irish, Singaporean, Indonesian, Malay and Middle East produced shows use the ISAN format, which is burned in on the end copyright slate.
- A variables and numbers of German, Spanish, Swiss, Thai, Indian, Chinese and Taiwanese produced shows use the ITU and ISAN format, which is burned in on the end copyright slate.
- ABS-CBN Studios and GMA Network the production reference code number for drama series uses a code of SSSS-L, with the S for four-digit numbers and L for one-digit variables for ABS-CBN Studios and the production reference code number for drama series uses a code of NNNN-NN-L, with the N for six-digit numbers and L for one-digit variable for GMA Network.
- TV5 the production reference code number for all of series uses a code of SSSSS-L, with the S for five-digit numbers and L for one-digit variable except I, O, Q, U, X and Z.
- TV Asahi the production reference code number for anime series of episodes uses a code of SSSSS-SEL, with the S for six-digit numbers, E for one-digit dates or months for calendar and L for one-digit variable.
- Fuji TV the production reference code number for anime series of episodes uses a code of SSSSSSS with the S for seven-digit numbers
- Pokémon (TV series) uses for Japanese anime series codes for LLSSS for L for two-digit variables and S for three-digit variables (ex. EP001, AG001, DP001, BW001, XY001, SM001, JN001, HZ001 or SS001) within a direction and creation for OLM (studio) in the origin of Pokémon (TV series) has been for copyright and production references.
- Doctor Who uses a code for L for one-digit variable in 1963–1966, LL for two-digit variables in 1966–1969, LLL for three-digit variables in 1970–1974, SL for S for one-digit number and L for one-digit variable in 1974–1989 and revival in 2005 using code S.S for S for two-digit variables and the specialists for X for one-digit special numbers only broadcasting from BBC.
