= Adam Horowitz =

American screenwriter and producer

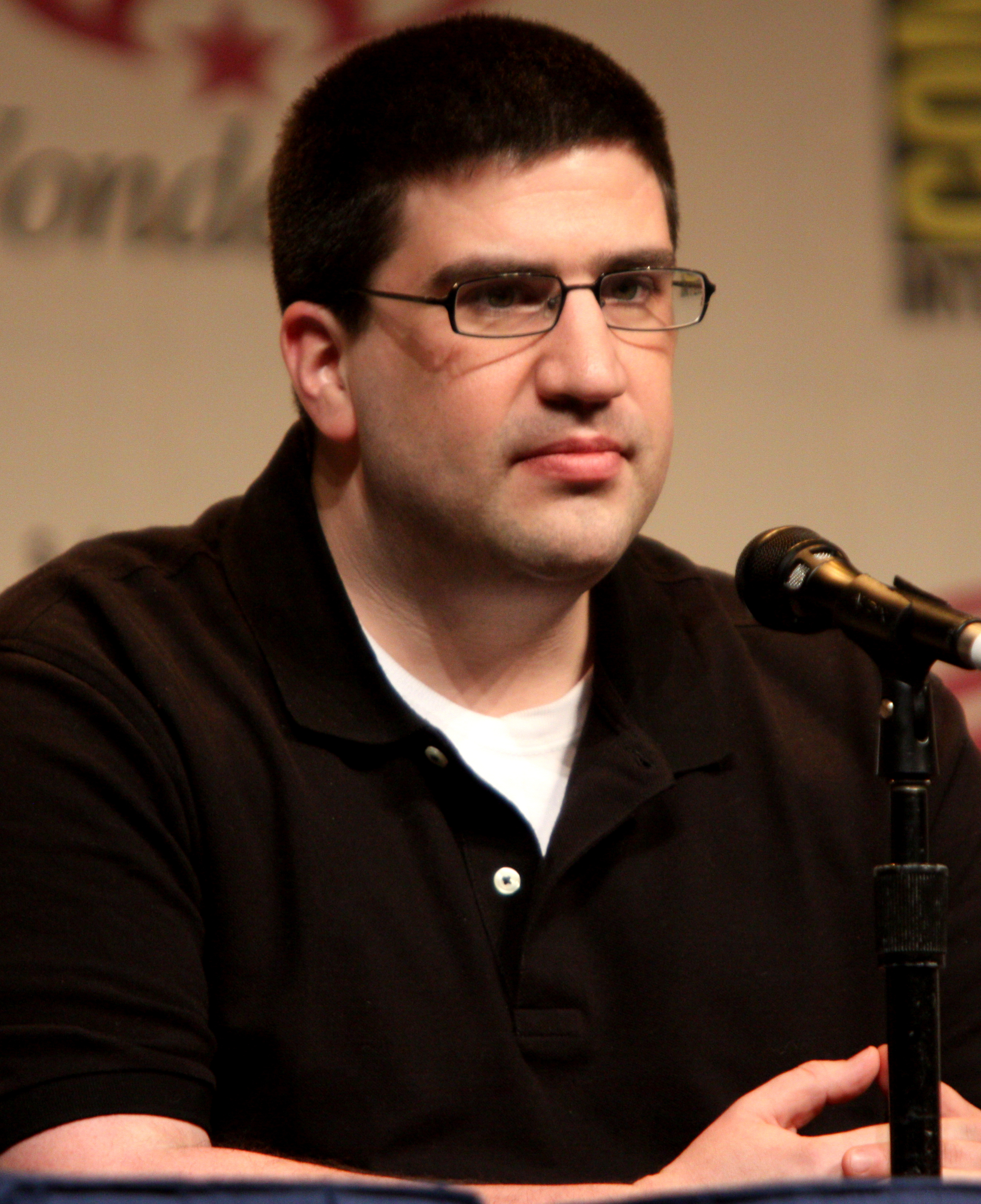
- Horowitz in March 2012
- Born: New York City, U.S.
- Education: University of Wisconsin–Madison
- Occupations: Screenwriter; producer
- Years active: 1994–present
- Known for: Co-creator of Once Upon a Time

Adam Horowitz is an American screenwriter and producer, best known for his work with his writing partner Edward Kitsis on the ABC drama series Lost and Once Upon a Time.

== Early life ==
Horowitz was born in New York City, and graduated from Hunter College High School in 1990. He attended University of Wisconsin–Madison and graduated with a B.A. in 1994, majoring in communication arts and political science. There he met his future collaborator, Edward Kitsis. Horowitz was writer and reporter for the Daily Cardinal student newspaper, writing as many as five articles in the same issue. He often caught editors off-guard with humorous leads or picking odd quotes. He worked on articles about spearfishing and the Exxon Valdez oil spill.

== Career ==
=== Television ===
After graduating, Kitsis and Horowitz traveled together to Los Angeles, and worked together on Fantasy Island, Felicity and Popular, before joining the Lost team halfway through the first season. He is married to Erin Barrett Horowitz.

Horowitz, Kitsis and the Lost writing staff won the Writers Guild of America (WGA) Award for Best Dramatic Series at the February 2006 ceremony for their work on the first and second seasons. They were nominated for the WGA Award for Best Dramatic Series again at the February 2007 ceremony for their work on the second and third seasons, at the February 2009 ceremony for the fourth season of Lost and at the February 2010 ceremony for the fifth season. They also wrote Confessions of an American Bride, a made-for-television movie. During Lost's run, he signed an overall deal with ABC Studios in 2007.

Horowitz and Kitsis created the ABC fantasy drama series Once Upon a Time, which began airing on October 23, 2011. The show focuses on a town which is actually a parallel world populated by fairytale characters who are unaware of their true identity. The two came up with the concept seven years prior to joining the staff of Lost, but wanted to wait until it ended before they focused on this project.

Kitsis and Horowitz also worked on the first four episodes of Tron: Uprising. He explains that he has used this chance to explore the Tron universe, particularly the life of a program under CLU's regime.

Kitsis, Horowitz, and Josh Gad served as creators and writers for a limited prequel series to Disney's 2017 film Beauty and the Beast. The series was conceived after the three had a discussion after the cancellation of their planned Disney+ series, Muppets Live Another Day. In December 2019, it was announced that Horowitz and Kitsis were working on a new TV show set in the world of fairy tales and Disney titled Epic. The pilot was picked up by ABC in January 2021, however it was dropped in August of the same year.

=== Film ===
Kitsis and Horowitz worked as writers on early unused drafts of the Universal project Ouija, and co-wrote the film Tron: Legacy in 2010.

He frequently collaborates with a tightly knit group of film professionals which include J. J. Abrams, Damon Lindelof, Alex Kurtzman, Roberto Orci, Edward Kitsis, Andre Nemec, Josh Appelbaum, Jeff Pinkner, and Bryan Burk.

== Credits ==
- Dead of Summer, 2016 (with Edward Kitsis)
  - Episode 1.01 "Patience" (also with Ian Goldberg) (also as director)
  - Episode 1.03 "Mix Tape"
  - Episode 1.04 "Modern Love"
  - Episode 1.10 "She Talks to Angels"
- Once Upon a Time in Wonderland, 2013–2014 (with Edward Kitsis)
  - Episode 1.01 "Down the Rabbit Hole" (also with Zack Estrin and Jane Espenson)
  - Episode 1.08 "Home" (also with Zack Estrin)
  - Episode 1.13 "And They Lived..." (also with Zack Estrin)
- Tron: Uprising, 2012
  - Episode 1.01 "Beck's Beginning" with Edward Kitsis
  - Episode 1.02 "The Renegade, Part 1" with Kitsis (Story – Written by Kamran Pasha, Adam Nussdorf and Bill Wolkoff)
  - Episode 1.03 "The Renegade, Part 2" with Kitsis (Story – Written by Kamran Pasha, Adam Nussdorf and Bill Wolkoff)
  - Episode 1.04 "Blackout" with Kitsis
- Once Upon a Time, 2011–2018 (with Edward Kitsis)
  - Episode 1.01 "Pilot"
  - Episode 1.02 "The Thing You Love Most"
  - Episode 1.07 "The Heart Is a Lonely Hunter"
  - Episode 1.10 "7:15 A.M." (story with Kitsis, teleplay by Daniel T. Thomsen)
  - Episode 1.14 "Dreamy"
  - Episode 1.18 "The Stable Boy"
  - Episode 1.22 "A Land Without Magic"
  - Episode 2.01 "Broken"
  - Episode 2.05 "The Doctor"
  - Episode 2.09 "Queen of Hearts"
  - Episode 2.14 "Manhattan"
  - Episode 2.19 "Lacey"
  - Episode 2.22 "And Straight On 'til Morning"
  - Episode 3.01 "The Heart of the Truest Believer"
  - Episode 3.06 "Ariel"
  - Episode 3.11 "Going Home"
  - Episode 3.12 "New York City Serenade"
  - Episode 3.19 "A Curious Thing"
  - Episode 3.22 "There's No Place Like Home"
  - Episode 4.01 "A Tale of Two Sisters"
  - Episode 4.07 "The Snow Queen"
  - Episode 4.11 "Heroes and Villains"
  - Episode 4.12 "Darkness on the Edge of Town"
  - Episode 4.13 "Unforgiven" (as director)
  - Episode 4.21/22 "Operation Mongoose"
  - Episode 5.01 "The Dark Swan"
  - Episode 5.05 "Dreamcatcher"
  - Episode 5.11 "Swan Song"
  - Episode 5.12 "Souls of the Departed" (100th episode)
  - Episode 5.23 "An Untold Story"
  - Episode 6.01 "The Savior"
  - Episode 6.05 "Street Rats"
  - Episode 6.10 "Wish You Were Here"
  - Episode 6.11 "Tougher Than the Rest"
  - Episode 6.16 "Mother's Little Helper" (story with Kitsis, teleplay by Paul Karp)
  - Episode 6.21/22 "The Final Battle"
  - Episode 7.01 "Hyperion Heights"
  - Episode 7.11 "Secret Garden"
  - Episode 7.19 "Flower Child"
  - Episode 7.22 "Leaving Storybrooke" (series finale)
- Tron: Legacy, 2010 (with Edward Kitsis)
- Lost, 2005–2010
  - Episode 1.22 "Born to Run" teleplay with Edward Kitsis, story by Javier Grillo-Marxuach
  - Episode 2.04 "Everybody Hates Hugo" with Kitsis
  - Episode 2.12 "Fire and Water" with Kitsis
  - Episode 2.18 "Dave" with Kitsis
  - Episode 2.22 "Three Minutes" with Kitsis
  - Episode 3.04 "Every Man for Himself" with Kitsis
  - Episode 3.10 "Tricia Tanaka Is Dead" with Kitsis
  - Episode 3.14 "Exposé" with Kitsis
  - Episode 3.18 "D.O.C." with Kitsis
  - Episode 3.21 "Greatest Hits" with Kitsis
  - Episode 4.03 "The Economist" with Kitsis
  - Episode 4.07 "Ji Yeon" with Kitsis
  - Episode 4.10 "Something Nice Back Home" with Kitsis
  - Episode 5.02 "The Lie" with Kitsis
  - Episode 5.05 "This Place Is Death" with Kitsis
  - Episode 5.10 "He's Our You" with Kitsis
  - Episode 5.14 "The Variable" with Kitsis
  - Episode 6.02 "What Kate Does" with Kitsis
  - Episode 6.07 "Dr. Linus" with Kitsis
  - Episode 6.12 "Everybody Loves Hugo" with Kitsis
  - Episode 6.16 "What They Died For" with Kitsis and Elizabeth Sarnoff
- Confessions of an American Bride, 2005 with Edward Kitsis
- Life as We Know It, 2004
  - Episode 1.08 "Family Hard-ships" with Edward Kitsis
- One Tree Hill, 2004
  - Episode 1.20 "What Is and What Should Never Be" with Edward Kitsis
- Black Sash, 2003
  - Episode 1.04 "Prodigal Son" with Edward Kitsis
- Birds of Prey, 2002–2003
  - Episode 1.03 "Prey for the Hunter" teleplay with Edward Kitsis, story by Adam Armus & Kay Foster
  - Episode 1.06 "Primal Scream" teleplay with Kitsis, story by Adam Armus & Kay Foster
  - Episode 1.07 "Split" teleplay with Kitsis, story by Adam Armus & Kay Foster
  - Episode 1.08 "Lady Shiva" teleplay with Kitsis, story by Adam Armus & Kay Foster
  - Episode 1.11 "Reunion" with Kitsis
- Felicity, 2001
  - Episode 4.03 "Your Money or Your Wife" with Edward Kitsis
  - Episode 4.09 "Moving On" with Kitsis
- Popular, 1999–2001
  - Episode 1.08 "Tonight's the Night" with Edward Kitsis and Ryan Murphy
  - Episode 1.15 "Booty Camp" with Kitsis
  - Episode 1.21 "What Makes Sammy Run" with Kitsis
  - Episode 2.02 "Baby, Don't Do It" with Kitsis
  - Episode 2.07 "Ur-ine Trouble" with Kitsis
  - Episode 2.12 "The Shocking Possession of Harrison John" with Kitsis
  - Episode 2.15 "It's Greek to Me" with Kitsis
  - Episode 2.20 "You Don't Tug on Superman's Cape...You Don't Spit into the Wind...You Don't Pull the Mask off the Ol' Lone Ranger...And You Don't Mess Around with Big Bertha Muffin" with Kitsis
- Fantasy Island, 1998–1999
  - Episode 1.02 "Superfriends" with Edward Kitsis
  - Episode 1.08 "Handymen" with Kitsis
  - Episode 1.12 "The Real Thing" with Kitsis
- Untitled Beauty and the Beast series (with Kitsis and Josh Gad)

== Awards ==
- 2005 Writers Guild of America Award for Best Dramatic Series for Lost.
- 2000 SHINE Award for Best Comedy Episode for Popular episode "Booty Camp".
- Nominated for 2000 Shine Award for Best Dramatic Episode for Popular episode "Tonight's the Night".
- Nominated for 2008 Primetime Emmy for Outstanding Drama Series for Lost
- Nominated for 2009 Primetime Emmy for Outstanding Drama Series for Lost
- Nominated for 2010 Primetime Emmy for Outstanding Drama Series for Lost
