= The Greater Good (Lost) =

- Lost episode
- Shannon holds Locke at gunpoint.
- Episode no.: Season 1 Episode 21
- Directed by: David Grossman
- Written by: Leonard Dick
- Production code: 119
- Original air date: May 4, 2005
- Running time: 42 minutes

Guest appearances
- Donnie Keshawarz as Essam Tasir; Jenny Gago as Alyssa Cole; Dariush Kashani as Haddad; David Patterson as Robbie Hewitt; Ali Shaheed Amini as Yusef; Warren Kundis as Imam

Episode chronology
| ← Previous "Do No Harm" | Next → "Born to Run" |
- Lost season 1

"The Greater Good" is the 21st episode of the first season of Lost. The episode was directed by David Grossman and written by Leonard Dick. It first aired on May 4, 2005, on ABC. The character of Sayid Jarrah (Naveen Andrews) is featured in the episode's flashbacks.

== Plot ==
=== Flashbacks ===
Arrested at Heathrow Airport on trumped-up terrorism charges, Sayid is recruited as an informant by the Australian Secret Intelligence Service and the CIA, who ask him to infiltrate a terrorist cell in Sydney of which his old friend Essam is a member. After they explain that they know where Nadia is, he agrees. It is revealed that after helping her escape several years ago, Sayid left Iraq and has been travelling the world trying to find her ever since. Sayid flies to Sydney and infiltrates the terrorist cell, telling the agents that Essam is in over his head, and that he can bring him in. The agents tell him to convince Essam to go ahead with the suicide bombing so that he will lead them to the explosives, and threaten Nadia's life when Sayid attempts to refuse. On the day of the attack, Sayid reveals he is an informant, and a distraught Essam kills himself. After Essam's death, the agents tell Sayid where Nadia is living in California, and hand him a plane ticket and money. Sayid inquires about Essam's body, and is told that because no one will claim it, the body will be burned. Sayid insists on claiming the body himself, as Essam was a Muslim man (and Muslims believe in burial, not cremation). Upon being told that his flight is in two hours so he cannot claim the body, Sayid asks them to reschedule his flight for the next day, to which they agree.

=== On the Island ===
At the caves, Sayid observes a mourning Shannon Rutherford (Maggie Grace), before asking if he can do anything for her. At the same time, Kate Austen (Evangeline Lilly) tracks down an exhausted and obstinate Jack Shephard (Matthew Fox). Jack blames John Locke (Terry O'Quinn) for Boone Carlyle's (Ian Somerhalder) death, but Kate pleads with Jack to return. At the beach, the survivors bury Boone. During the funeral, Locke arrives and attempts to explain what happened, but Jack ignores him and flies into a rage.

Afterward, Jack explains to Sayid, Sun-Hwa Kwon (Yunjin Kim), and Kate that Locke is lying, but they insist that Jack must rest. Locke asks Shannon's forgiveness, to no avail; Shannon instead goes to Sayid and asks if he could do something about Locke for her (implying that she wants him to kill Locke).

Meanwhile, Charlie Pace (Dominic Monaghan) tells Claire Littleton (Emilie de Ravin) that she needs to rest, and though reluctant at first she lets him take care of her baby. Charlie has a tough time getting the baby to stop crying, even having Hugo "Hurley" Reyes (Jorge Garcia) sing the song "I Feel Good" to no avail, but finally discovers that the sound of Sawyer's voice quiets the baby.

Kate attempts to take care of Jack, who stubbornly insists he needs to deal with Locke. Realizing he'd probably try this, Kate drugs his juice and he falls asleep, leaving Sayid free to deal with Locke. Sayid arrives at the caves and begins questioning Locke, asking Locke to show him the Beechcraft. As they walk to it, Sayid interrogates Locke, who realizes just what Sayid is doing. Upon arriving at the plane, their cat-and-mouse game escalates. Sayid tells Locke he knows Locke has a gun, and Locke hands it over. He then reveals that it was he who hit Sayid over the head when he was trying to triangulate the distress signal. This enrages Sayid, who pulls the gun on Locke and questions him about the hatch. Locke lies, saying Boone was talking about the plane's hatches.

Sayid returns to the beach and explains to Shannon that he believes Locke did not mean to harm Boone. Angered, Shannon steals the guncase key from the sleeping Jack, and confronts Locke in the jungle. Kate, Jack, and Sayid arrive during the confrontation, but Shannon refuses to back down. Left with no choice, Sayid tackles Shannon just as she fires the gun, the bullet grazing Locke's head.

That night, Sayid visits Locke, who thanks him for saving his life. Sayid replies that he only did it because he believes Locke to be their best chance for survival. He then tells Locke to take him to the hatch.

== Reception ==
17.2 million American viewers tuned into this episode. Chris Carabott from IGN commented "[Boone and Shannon] were both left with very little to do this season. Especially Shannon, whose high point of usefulness was deciphering Rousseau's documents for Sayid. Well, Maggie Grace is given an opportunity to shine and she does an acceptable job as the distraught sibling who is now looking for someone to blame for Boone's death. We finally get to see some real depth to Shannon's character and her quest for vengeance is believable".
