= Do No Harm (Lost) =

- Lost episode
- Kate and Sun look on as Jack treats a critically injured Boone
- Episode no.: Season 1 Episode 20
- Directed by: Stephen Williams
- Written by: Janet Tamaro
- Production code: 118
- Original air date: April 6, 2005
- Running time: 43 minutes

Guest appearances
- John Terry as Christian Shephard; Zack Ward as Marc Silverman; Julie Bowen as Sarah; Clarence Logan as Minister; John Tilton as Tux shop owner

Episode chronology
← Previous "Deus Ex Machina"	Next → "The Greater Good"
- Lost season 1

"Do No Harm" is the twentieth episode of the first season of Lost. The episode was directed by Stephen Williams and written by Janet Tamaro. It first aired on April 6, 2005, on ABC.

While trying to make contact with the outside world from a plane discovered in the jungle tree canopy, Boone Carlyle (Ian Somerhalder) is critically injured when the plane suddenly shifts and crashes to the ground, so Jack Shephard (Matthew Fox) desperately tries to save his life. The flashbacks in this episode revolve around Jack's marriage to a former patient, Sarah (Julie Bowen).

== Plot ==
=== Flashbacks ===
Flashbacks show both the build-up to, and the event of Jack's wedding to Sarah, a former patient whom he "fixed" after she was injured in a car accident. Jack agonizes over his vows, and his father, Christian (John Terry) surprises him by showing up, giving Jack advice about writing the vows by the pool. His father says that Jack's strength is commitment, and that his problem is that he is "just not good at letting go." Jack thinks over his father's words, and eventually writes his vows just in time for the ceremony, finally settling on extolling how Sarah has "fixed" him.

=== On the Island ===
Boone has been critically injured by his fall inside the Beechcraft in the previous episode. He has lost a lot of blood, one of his lungs has collapsed and his right leg is crushed. Jack sends Kate Austen (Evangeline Lilly) off to get some alcohol from James "Sawyer" Ford (Josh Holloway). On her way back, she discovers that Claire Littleton (Emilie de Ravin) has gone into unexpected labour.

Sayid Jarrah (Naveen Andrews) surprises Shannon Rutherford (Maggie Grace) with a "torchlit dinner". Shannon tells Sayid that Boone is only her step-brother, and that he is "kind of" in love with her.

Boone needs a transfusion of type A-negative. Jack sends Charlie Pace (Dominic Monaghan) to find one of the other survivors with a matching blood type. When he unsuccessfully returns (only four people knew their blood type), Jack decides to give Boone some of his O-negative blood. Jack tries to use bamboo as a needle but can't pierce his skin. Sun-Hwa Kwon (Yunjin Kim) solves the problem by providing a sea urchin. Using the urchin's spines, Jack begins to give Boone his blood.

Jin-Soo Kwon (Daniel Dae Kim), while working on the new raft, hears Kate's call for help and rushes to her and Claire. Despite the language barrier, Kate is able to tell Jin to go and find Jack. Jin rushes to the caves but Jack is occupied with the blood transfusion. Jack tells Jin (with the aid of Sun translating) to take Charlie to Kate and Claire, and gives Charlie instructions for Kate on delivering the baby.

As Jack begins to turn pale Sun stops the transfusion because the blood is pooling in Boone's dead right leg. Jack tries to save Boone's leg but it is beyond repair and Boone will die if it is not amputated. Jack asks Michael Dawson (Harold Perrineau) to find a way to cut off Boone's leg. Boone suddenly regains consciousness and tells Jack to just let him go.

Boone reveals to Jack that he and John Locke (Terry O'Quinn) discovered a mysterious hatch, and Locke told him not to tell anybody else. Boone says "Tell Shannon I ..." but dies without finishing the sentence. Claire gives birth to a healthy baby boy. Jack tells Shannon that Boone had died, Shannon immediately goes to the caves, and cries over Boone's dead body. Jack goes looking for Locke, thinking that Boone was murdered.

== Production ==
In the original outline of the eleventh episode, Locke was to be accompanied by two guest characters to search for Claire and discover the Hatch. In the final product, Boone accompanied Locke, a choice that would lead to Boone's death. While the executive producers have stated that Somerhalder took the news of his character's death professionally, Somerhalder has said that he found it "pretty devastating." Boone's death is notable as the first death of a major character on the series. According to executive producers Damon Lindelof and Carlton Cuse, Boone's death made sense from a story perspective to fuel the rivalry between Jack and Locke and lead to the events in the season finale.

Following Somerhalder's departure from the show, ABC signed him to another one-year contract. Somerhalder stated that being a part of Lost was "the greatest experience" of "the greatest year of his life".

== Reception ==
The American viewers for this episode were 17.12 million. IGN ranked Boone's death as #4 in their list of the top ten Lost deaths.

== Episode references ==
Boone says to Jack "I know you made me a promise. I'm letting you off the hook." This was also said to Jack by Rose in the season 1 episode "Walkabout". This was also said by Sarah to Jack in "Man of Science, Man of Faith" in a flashback.

== Cultural references ==
The title refers to the Primum non nocere phrase in the Hippocratic Oath.
