= Edward Kitsis =

American screenwriter and television producer (born 1971)

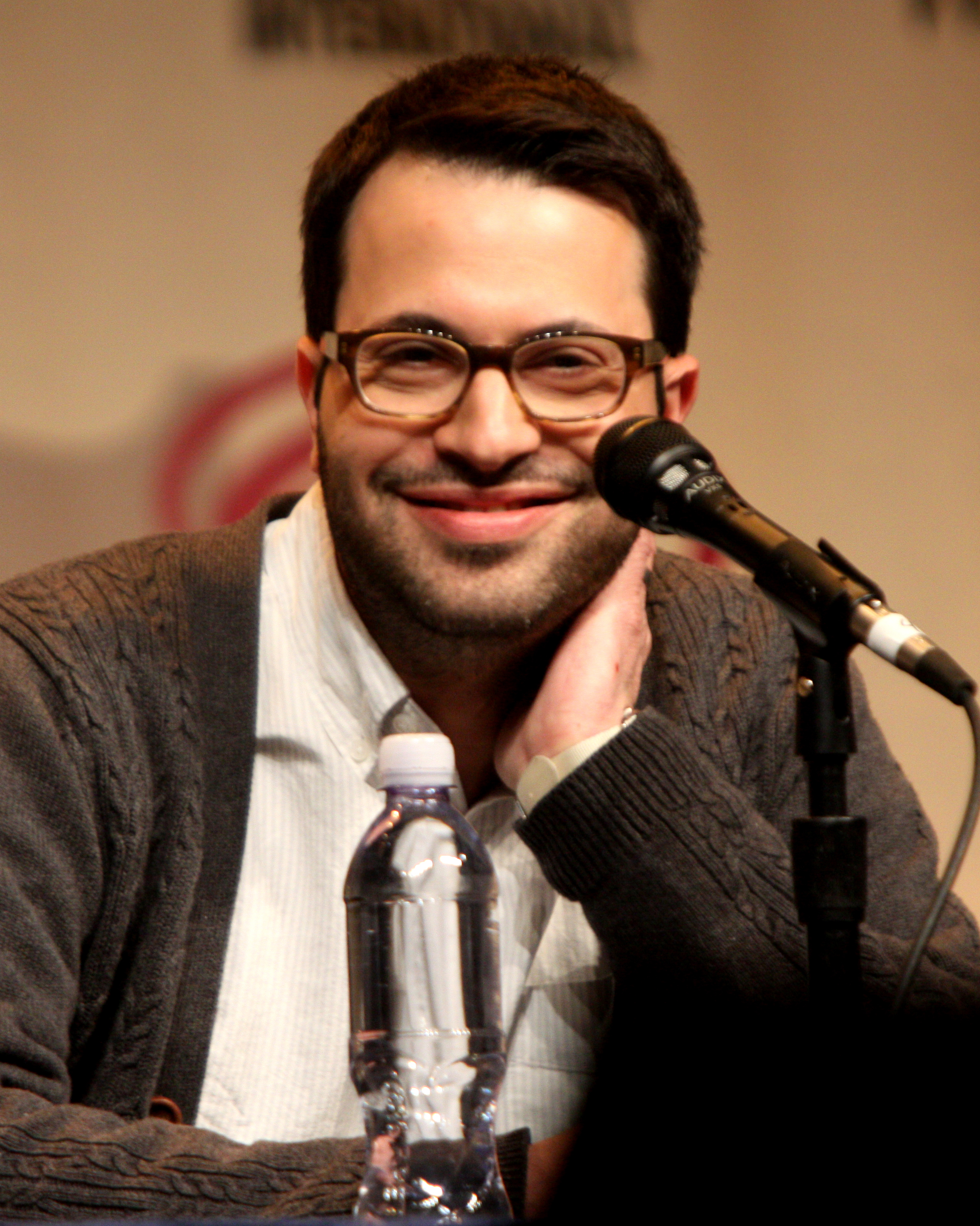
- Kitsis in March 2012.
- Born: Edward Lawrence Kitsis; February 4, 1971 (age 55); Minnesota, U.S.
- Education: University of Wisconsin–Madison (B.A., 1993)
- Notable work: Lost; Once Upon a Time
- Spouse: Jennifer Susman (m. 2003)
- Parent(s): Arlene and Tybe Kitsis

Edward Lawrence Kitsis (born February 4, 1971) is an American screenwriter and television producer, best known for his work with his writing partner Adam Horowitz on the ABC drama series Lost and Once Upon a Time.

== Early life and education ==
Kitsis was born to a Jewish American family, the son of Arlene and Tybe Kitsis of Minneapolis. In 1993, he graduated with a B.A. in radio, television, and film from the University of Wisconsin–Madison, where he met Adam Horowitz in his "Introduction to Film" class.

== Career ==
After school, Kitsis travelled with Horowitz to Los Angeles. They initially started working as assistants and messengers until landing a job writing scripts for the remake of Fantasy Island. It was cancelled after 13 episodes, but they went on to write for both Felicity and Popular, before joining Lost.

Kitsis and Horowitz joined the crew of Lost midway through the first season as a writer and producer team in 2005. They were promoted to supervising producers for the second season in fall 2005. Kitsis, Horowitz and the writing staff won the Writers Guild of America (WGA) Award for Best Dramatic Series at the February 2006 ceremony for their work on the first and second seasons. They were promoted to co-executive producers for the third season in the 2006-2007 television season. They returned as a co-executive producers and writers for the fourth season in 2008. Kitsis and Horowitz were nominated for the WGA Award for Best Dramatic Series at the February 2009 ceremony for their work on the fourth season of Lost. They were promoted to executive producers for the fifth season in 2009. The writing staff was nominated for the WGA award for Best Dramatic Series again at the February 2010 ceremony for their work on the fifth season. Kitsis and Horowitz remained as executive producers and regular writers for the sixth and final season in 2010. During Lost's run, both Kitsis and Horowitz signed an overall deal with ABC Studios in 2007.

Kitsis also wrote Tron: Legacy, the sequel to the film Tron, with his partner Horowitz and wrote with the same co-writer the book for Universal Pictures future project "Ouija Board".

Kitsis and Horowitz are the creators of the fantasy drama series Once Upon a Time, which began airing on ABC on October 23, 2011. The show focuses on a town which is actually a parallel world populated by fairytale characters who are unaware of their true identity. The two came up with concept seven years prior joining the staff of Lost, but wanted to wait until it ended before they focused on this project. He also co-created the Once Upon a Time spin-off, Once Upon a Time in Wonderland, along with partner Adam Horowitz, Zack Estrin and "Once" writer and Consulting Producer, Jane Espenson. The series, which began airing on ABC October 10, 2013, focuses on Alice searching for her true love, a genie named Cyrus, who is being kept from her by the Red Queen and Aladdin villain, Jafar, in a post-cursed Wonderland. Kitsis and Horowitz will also co-create and co-write a Beauty and the Beast miniseries for Disney+, alongside Josh Gad. The series, a prequel to Disney's 2017 remake of the 1991 film of the same name, was conceived after a discussion between Kitsis, Horowitz, and Gad following the cancellation of their planned Disney+ series, Muppets Live Another Day. In December 2019, it was announced that Kitsis and Horowitz began work on a new TV show focusing on characters from fairy tales and Disney titled Epic. The pilot was picked up by ABC in January 2021, however it was dropped in August of the same year.

He frequently collaborates with a tightly knit group of film professionals which include J. J. Abrams, Damon Lindelof, Adam Horowitz, Alex Kurtzman, Roberto Orci, Andre Nemec, Josh Appelbaum, Jeff Pinkner, and Bryan Burk.

== Personal life ==
In May 2002, it was announced that he was engaged to Jennifer Susman, a 1999 TV and film graduate of the University of Texas. They married on March 29, 2003, in Scottsdale, Arizona.

== Filmography ==
=== Film and television ===
Year	Title	Contribution			Notes
Year	Title	Creator	Writer	Producer	Notes
1995	Clueless	No	No	No	assistant to Adam Schroeder
1998	Fantasy Island	No	Yes	No	Episode: "Superfriends"
1999–2001	Popular	No	Yes	No	Writer of 8 episodes
2001–2002	Felicity	No	Yes	Yes	Writer of 2 episodes/Producer of 14 episodes
2002–2003	Birds of Prey	No	Yes	Yes	Writer of 5 episodes/Producer of 9 episodes
2003	Black Sash	No	Yes	Yes	Writer of 1 episode/Consulting Producer of 3 episodes
2004	One Tree Hill	No	Yes	No	Episode: "What Is and What Should Never Be"
2004–2005	Life as We Know It	No	Yes	Yes	Writer of 1 episode/Producer of 4 episodes
2005–2010	Lost	No	Yes	Yes	Writer of 21 episodes (2005–2010); Producer of 8 episodes (2005); Supervising Producer of 23 episodes (2005–2006); Co-Executive Producer of 35 episodes (2006–2008); Executive Producer of 32 episodes (2009–2010); Nominated – Primetime Emmy Award for Outstanding Drama Series (2008-2010); Nominated – Producers Guild Awards for Outstanding Producer of Episodic Television, Drama (2007-2011); Nominated – Writers Guild Awards for Dramatic Series (2006, 2007, 2009, 2010)
2005	Confessions of an American Bride	No	Yes	No	Television Movie
2007–2008	Lost: Missing Pieces	No	Yes	Yes	Miniseries; Writer of 1 episode/Co-Executive Producer of 13 episodes
2010	TRON: Legacy	No	Yes	No	Screenplay / Story
2011–2018	Once Upon a Time	Yes	Yes	Yes	Creator of 156 episodes Writer of 41 episodes Executive Producer of 143 episodes Nominated – TV Quick Award for Best New Drama (with Adam Horowitz) (2012)
2012	TRON: Uprising	No	Yes	Yes	Writer of 2 episodes/Consulting Producer of 1 episode
2013–2014	Once Upon a Time in Wonderland	Yes	Yes	Yes	Creator of 13 episodes Writer of 3 episodes Producer of 7 episodes
2016	Dead of Summer	Yes	Yes	Yes	Creator of 10 episodes Writer of 4 episodes Executive Producer of 4 episodes
2020	Amazing Stories	No	No	Yes	Executive Producer of 1 episode
TBA	Untitled Beauty and the Beast series	Yes	Yes	Yes	Executive Producer
