= Lost season 1 =

Season of television series

Lost
- Season 1
- DVD cover
- Showrunners: Damon Lindelof; Carlton Cuse
- Starring: Naveen Andrews; Emilie de Ravin; Matthew Fox; Jorge Garcia; Maggie Grace; Josh Holloway; Malcolm David Kelley; Daniel Dae Kim; Yunjin Kim; Evangeline Lilly; Dominic Monaghan; Terry O'Quinn; Harold Perrineau; Ian Somerhalder
- No. of episodes: 25

Release
- Original network: ABC
- Original release: September 22, 2004 – May 25, 2005

Season chronology
- Next → Season 2

The first season of the television series Lost commenced airing in the United States and Canada on September 22, 2004, concluded on May 25, 2005, and contained 25 episodes. It introduces the 48 survivors of a plane that broke apart in mid-air, scattering them on a remote island in the South Pacific. Forced to work together to survive, they come to realize it is no ordinary island.

The first season aired Wednesdays at 8:00 pm in the United States. In addition to the 25 regular episodes, a special, "Lost: The Journey", was aired on April 27, 2005, between the 20th and 21st episodes of the season. The season was released on DVD as a seven-disc boxed set under the title of Lost: The Complete First Season on September 6, 2005, by Buena Vista Home Entertainment.

== Crew ==
From left to right: Dawn Kelly, Rachel Mellon, Jennifer Johnson, Fletcher, Kitsis, Monica Macer, Cuse, Lindelof, Fury, Grillo-Marxuach, Dick, Adam Horowitz, Matt Ragghianti, and Dini

The season was produced by Touchstone Television (now ABC Studios), Bad Robot and Grass Skirt Productions and was aired on the ABC Network in the United States. The executive producers were co-creator J. J. Abrams, co-creator Damon Lindelof, Bryan Burk, Jack Bender and Carlton Cuse with Jesse Alexander and Jeff Pinkner serving as executive consultants. The staff writers were Abrams, Lindelof, Cuse, Alexander, Pinkner, co-executive producer David Fury, supervising producer Javier Grillo-Marxuach, producer Leonard Dick, producers Edward Kitsis & Adam Horowitz, co-producer Jennifer M. Johnson and story editor Paul Dini. Some of the first season's episodes were written or co-written by writers on a freelance basis. The regular directors throughout the season were J. J. Abrams, Jack Bender, Stephen Williams, Tucker Gates, Greg Yaitanes and Kevin Hooks. Its incidental music was composed by Michael Giacchino. Abrams, Lindelof and Cuse served as the season's showrunners.

== Cast ==
=== Main ===
From left to right: Sawyer, Locke, Rose, Jin, Sun, Sayid, Charlie, Walt, Michael, Jack, Kate, Hurley, Shannon, Claire, and Boone

The initial season had fourteen major roles with star billing.

- Naveen Andrews as Sayid Jarrah, a former Iraqi Republican Guard.
- Emilie de Ravin as Claire Littleton, a pregnant Australian. Until later in the season, de Ravin is only credited for the episodes in which she appears.
- Matthew Fox as Jack Shephard, a troubled surgeon, leader of the group, and protagonist.
- Jorge Garcia as Hugo "Hurley" Reyes, an unlucky lottery winner.
- Maggie Grace as Shannon Rutherford, a former dance teacher and Boone's stepsister.
- Josh Holloway as James "Sawyer" Ford, a con man.
- Malcolm David Kelley as Walt Lloyd, Michael's young son.
- Daniel Dae Kim as Jin-Soo Kwon, Sun-Hwa Kwon's husband.
- Yunjin Kim as Sun-Hwa Kwon, the daughter of a powerful Korean businessman and mobster.
- Evangeline Lilly as Kate Austen, a fugitive.
- Dominic Monaghan as Charlie Pace, an ex-rock star drug addict.
- Terry O'Quinn as the mysterious John Locke.
- Harold Perrineau as Michael Dawson, a construction worker and estranged father of Walt.
- Ian Somerhalder as Boone Carlyle, chief operating officer of his mother's wedding business and step brother of Shannon.

=== Recurring ===
- L. Scott Caldwell as Rose Henderson
- Mira Furlan as Danielle Rousseau
- Kimberley Joseph as Cindy
- Fredric Lane as Edward Mars
- William Mapother as Ethan Rom
- Daniel Roebuck as Leslie Arzt
- John Terry as Christian Shephard
- Madison as the labrador Vincent

=== Guest ===
- Michelle Rodriguez as Ana Lucia Cortez. She makes her first appearance this season, and she becomes a series regular in the second season.

== Reception ==
On the review aggregator website Metacritic, the first season scored 87 out of 100, based on 26 reviews, indicating "Universal acclaim". On Rotten Tomatoes, the season has an approval rating of 94% with an average score of 8.9/10 based on 46 reviews. The website's critical consensus reads, "Unpredictable and addictive, Lost is a new kind of TV mystery that grips as often as it guffaws."

The pilot episode garnered 18.6 million viewers, winning the 9:00 pm (Eastern) timeslot, and giving ABC its strongest ratings since 2000 when Who Wants to Be a Millionaire initially aired—beaten only the following month by the premiere of Desperate Housewives. Based on its strong opening, Reuters dubbed it a "hit drama" noting that "the show appeared to have benefited from an all-out marketing blitz that included radio spots, special screenings and ABC's first billboard advertising campaign in five years." After four episodes aired, ABC announced Lost had been picked up for a full season order. Lost's first season averaged about 17.6 million American viewers.

The first season was nominated for twelve Primetime Emmy Awards. They won six: Outstanding Casting for a Drama Series, Outstanding Directing for a Drama Series (J. J. Abrams for "Pilot"), Outstanding Drama Series, Outstanding Music Composition for a Series (Dramatic Underscore) (Michael Giacchino), Outstanding Single-Camera Picture Editing for a Drama Series and Outstanding Special Visual Effects for a Series. Terry O'Quinn and Naveen Andrews received nominations for Outstanding Supporting Actor in a Drama Series. J. J. Abrams, Damon Lindelof and Jeffrey Lieber were nominated for Outstanding Writing for a Drama Series for "Pilot", with David Fury receiving a nomination in the same category for the episode "Walkabout". The series also received nominations for Outstanding Single-Camera Sound Mixing for a Series, Outstanding Sound Editing for a Series. The show was also nominated for the Golden Globe Award for Best Television Series – Drama.

== Episodes ==
"Featured character(s)" refers to the character(s) whose back story is featured in the episode's flashbacks.

No. overall	No. in season	Title	Directed by	Written by	Featured character(s)	Original release date	U.S. viewers (millions)
1	1	"Pilot"	J. J. Abrams	Story by : Jeffrey Lieber and J. J. Abrams & Damon Lindelof; Teleplay by : J. J. Abrams & Damon Lindelof	Jack	September 22, 2004	18.65
2	2	"Pilot"	J. J. Abrams	Story by : Jeffrey Lieber and J. J. Abrams & Damon Lindelof; Teleplay by : J. J. Abrams & Damon Lindelof	Charlie & Kate	September 29, 2004	17.00
Surgeon Jack Shephard awakens on an island and follows a dog, Vincent, to the wreckage of Oceanic Flight 815, a plane he was taking from Sydney to Los Angeles. The crash survivors make an encampment on the beach. Jack, Kate Austen, and bassist Charlie Pace set out for the plane's separated front section, and Charlie ducks into the bathroom when they arrive. They find the pilot, who explains that they were off course when they crashed and rescuers will look in the wrong place. He is killed by an unseen force and the trio flee with a transceiver. Before the crash, Charlie tries to flush the heroin he is carrying. In the present, Jack tends to severely wounded U.S. marshal Edward Mars, who was transporting a fugitive, while SRG man Sayid Jarrah repairs the transceiver. He and a group of survivors set out for higher ground to call for help and are attacked by a polar bear, which is killed by con artist Sawyer with Mars's stolen gun. He and Sayid accuse each other of being Mars's detainee until Kate calms them, a flashback revealing that she was his prisoner. The group gets a signal, but finds it is blocked by a French message asking for rescue after the broadcaster's team was killed, which Sayid calculates has been looping for sixteen years.
3	3	"Tabula Rasa"	Jack Bender	Damon Lindelof	Kate	October 6, 2004	16.54
While on the run from Mars, Kate is taken in by a farmer, but he discovers her identity and tries to turn her in. She crashes his car but stops to save him from the wreckage, getting her captured by Mars. In the present, Jack discovers her mugshot and refuses to euthanize a dying Mars. Sawyer shoots him but misses his heart, forcing Jack to kill him. Kate offers to tell Jack why she was in custody, but he rebuffs her, stating that the island can be a new start for all of them. The enigmatic John Locke befriends young Walt Lloyd, who is looking for Vincent, his dog. His father Michael Dawson looks for Vincent in the jungle and is chased by the monster, while Locke carves a whistle and uses it to call the dog. He gives it to Michael, allowing him to return Vincent to Walt himself.
4	4	"Walkabout"	Jack Bender	David Fury	Locke	October 13, 2004	18.16
Locke plans an Australian walkabout that he believes he is destined to complete. In the present, he goes into the jungle to hunt boar as the camp's food runs low. Kate accompanies him, and when the monster attacks Locke, he later emerges from the jungle with a dead boar and denies seeing anything. Jack decides to burn the fuselage, which is being used as body storage. As the survivors burn it, a flashback reveals that Locke was paraplegic prior to the crash, preventing him from going on the walkabout, and woke up on the island with the use of his legs.
5	5	"White Rabbit"	Kevin Hooks	Christian Taylor	Jack	October 20, 2004	16.82
Jack's mother guilts him into retrieving his estranged father Christian from Australia. He goes and finds that Christian drank himself to death, loading his coffin onto the flight. In the present, Jack rescues Boone Carlyle from drowning, though a woman Boone was trying to save dies. Jack sees Christian walking through the jungle and encounters Locke while chasing him, who affirms his belief in the island's power and advises Jack to keep looking. He follows Christian to his coffin, which he finds empty. The survivors' water goes missing until Boone is caught with it, wanting to ration it himself and become a leader. Jack stops him from being beaten, insisting that "if we can't live together, we're going to die alone."
6	6	"House of the Rising Sun"	Michael Zinberg	Javier Grillo-Marxuach	Sun	October 27, 2004	16.83
Wealthy Korean Sun-Hwa Paik and waiter Jin-Soo Kwon fall in love, and he works for her father Woo-Jung for her hand in marriage. They argue frequently as his work turns criminal, and she sets up a way to escape their relationship as she secretly learns English, only to board Flight 815 with Jin when he affirms his love for her. In the present, he attacks Michael. Sun explains that he found Woo-Jung's watch after the crash and Jin assumed he stole it, and Michael returns it. Locke recognizes Charlie's addiction and convinces him to hand over his drugs in exchange for pointing him to his lost guitar. Jack discovers a cave with a pair of skeletons inside, and the survivors debate on whether to move to the caves or stay on the beach and split in two.
7	7	"The Moth"	Jack Bender	Jennifer Johnson & Paul Dini	Charlie	November 3, 2004	18.73
Charlie's brother and band member Liam uses heroin, his unstable nature pressing Charlie into starting. Several years later, he encourages Charlie to stay with him in Sydney and get sober, but he refuses and leaves for Los Angeles. In the present, Sayid attempts to triangulate the French signal, but is attacked before he can corner it. Suffering from withdrawal, Charlie begs Locke for his drugs, who says he will return them if asked three times. He shouts at Jack and causes a cave-in. Charlie follows a moth to an opening that he digs his way out of. He asks Locke a third time for the drugs, but instead burns them as he starts to recover from his illness.
8	8	"Confidence Man"	Tucker Gates	Damon Lindelof	Sawyer	November 10, 2004	18.44
Sawyer cons a woman he is sleeping with, but before he can leave with the money, he realizes she has a young son and abandons the job. In the present, Boone's stepsister Shannon Rutherford cannot find an asthma inhaler, which he believes Sawyer has in his hoard of items from the crash. Sawyer tells Kate that he will give up the inhalers for a kiss, who asks about a letter she often sees him reading, which is written by a boy who blames him for his parents's murder-suicide. After Sayid tortures him, Kate kisses him and he admits he never had the inhalers. Kate realizes that the letter was written by Sawyer himself, who explains that he named himself after the con man. Shannon is saved when Sun makes a eucalyptus salve, while Sawyer considers burning the letter but decides against it.
9	9	"Solitary"	Greg Yaitanes	David Fury	Sayid	November 17, 2004	17.64
Sayid is ordered to torture his childhood friend Nadia Jaseem, but he instead kills his superior and stages her escape. In the present, Sayid is captured by native Danielle Rousseau while following a cable, who tortures him and demands to know where "Alex" is, believing him to be one of "the Others." He explains the crash to her and she identifies herself as the originator of the transmission. Sayid tries to escape, but she corners him and demands he stay, needing companionship. She admits she killed her companions to keep their disease from spreading, and after Sayid talks her down, she explains that Alex was her daughter.
10	10	"Raised by Another"	Marita Grabiak	Lynne E. Litt	Claire	December 1, 2004	17.15
Claire Littleton's boyfriend leaves her over her pregnancy and her psychic Richard Malkin warns her that the baby will be in danger if not raised properly. He gives her a ticket for Flight 815, insisting that a couple in Los Angeles can take it. In the present, she has disturbing dreams about being attacked and losing the baby. Her fear of an attack prompts Hugo "Hurley" Reyes to start making a census. Claire starts having contractions while Charlie moves her to the beach, telling Ethan Rom to get Jack. She tells him Malkin's story, and he suggests that he predicted the crash and this was his way of forcing her to raise the baby herself. As Sayid returns to camp warning of the Others and Hurley reports that there is one more person on the census than the flight manifest, Ethan approaches Claire and Charlie.
11	11	"All the Best Cowboys Have Daddy Issues"	Stephen Williams	Javier Grillo-Marxuach	Jack	December 8, 2004	18.88
A drunken Christian botches a surgery and Jack takes over, but is unable to save the patient. Christian has Jack vouch that he was sober, but when a hospital board meeting is called about the patient, Jack is horrified to learn she was pregnant and recants his statement. In the present, the survivors go after Ethan and Jack finds Charlie hanged from a tree. Despite him not breathing, Jack performs frantic CPR, reviving him. While searching for Ethan, Boone and Locke find a metal hatch in the ground.
12	12	"Whatever the Case May Be"	Jack Bender	Damon Lindelof & Jennifer Johnson	Kate	January 5, 2005	21.59
Kate helps a trio of men rob a bank, betrays them when she gets to the back, and takes an envelope from a safety deposit box. In the present, Sayid asks the French-speaking Shannon to translate Rousseau's notes, which she recognizes as lyrics from "La Mer". Kate and Sawyer find a locked suitcase while swimming. She tricks Jack into digging up Mars so she can take the key from his body, but he catches her and makes her open it with him. The envelope is inside, which contains a toy plane that she says belonged to a lover she killed.
13	13	"Hearts and Minds"	Rod Holcomb	Carlton Cuse & Javier Grillo-Marxuach	Boone	January 12, 2005	20.81
Boone comes to Sydney to bribe Shannon's abusive boyfriend to leave her. Boone realizes she pocketed the bribe as she had with former boyfriends. She drunkenly accuses him of being in love with her and they have sex. In the present, Boone, jealous of Shannon's growing bond with Sayid, decides to tell her about the hatch, only for Locke to attack him before he can do so. He ties Boone up and dresses his head wound with a paste. Boone hears Shannon screaming for help and frees himself with Locke's knife, finding her tied to a tree and fleeing with her from the monster. It catches her and he later finds her dead body. He goes to kill Locke, who reveals that the paste was a hallucinogen, which he drugged Boone with to ensure his faith.
14	14	"Special"	Greg Yaitanes	David Fury	Michael & Walt	January 19, 2005	19.69
Shortly after Walt is born, Michael's wife Susan leaves him. She dies years later and Walt's stepfather, unsettled by an incident where a bird Walt was reading about slammed into a window, asks him to come to Sydney to take custody of him. In the present, Locke and Boone teach Walt survivalist skills, but are forcibly interrupted by Michael. As Walt rebels under his strict parenting, he chases a runaway Vincent into the jungle and is cornered by a polar bear. Locke and Michael work together to save his life, earning Walt's respect. Locke and Boone encounter Claire in the jungle.
15	15	"Homecoming"	Kevin Hooks	Damon Lindelof	Charlie	February 9, 2005	19.48
Needing money for drugs, Charlie courts a rich woman, but genuinely falls in love with her and finds work with her father. His withdrawal symptoms kick in on his first day and ruin the job, and she leaves him. In the present, Claire has no memory of anything after the crash and Ethan approaches Charlie, threatening to kill survivors until she is returned. Jack plans to use Claire as bait to ambush him, getting guns from Mars's suitcase. The plan works, but Charlie kills Ethan before they can interrogate him. Claire remembers a moment she and Charlie shared together and decides to put her trust in him.
16	16	"Outlaws"	Jack Bender	Drew Goddard	Sawyer	February 16, 2005	17.88
An associate tells Sawyer that the real Sawyer is in Australia under the name "Frank Duckett", but he cannot bring himself to kill him. At a bar he meets Christian, who laments not having the strength to reconcile with Jack and advises Sawyer to fix his problem. Sawyer shoots Duckett, realizing that he is not the real Sawyer but is in debt to Sawyer's associate. In the present, Sawyer chases a boar that invaded his tent. Kate joins him in the pursuit and they encounter Locke, who warns Sawyer that he may be projecting Duckett onto the boar. When Sawyer corners the animal, he leaves it alive. He returns Mars's gun to Jack, who uses a phrase that Christian said to him in Australia, causing him to realize their relation.
17	17	"...In Translation"	Tucker Gates	Javier Grillo-Marxuach & Leonard Dick	Jin	February 23, 2005	19.49
Woo-Jung asks Jin to intimidate a government official, who fails to appease him. Woo-Jung sends a hitman, but Jin brutalizes the official instead to save his life and argues with Sun upon returning home bloodstained. Distraught, he reconciles with his estranged father, who advises him to run away with Sun upon landing in America. In the present, Sayid and Shannon begin a relationship. Michael intervenes when Jin and Sun argue over her wearing a bikini, leading to a fight between the men. The raft Michael has been building is burnt that night and he attacks Jin, which is broken up by Sun revealing her English. Locke convinces the survivors that the raft was burnt by the Others, but privately tells Walt he knows he burnt the raft because he enjoys life on the island. Jin refuses Sun's offer to reconcile and helps Michael rebuild the raft, while she goes to the beach alone in her bikini.
18	18	"Numbers"	Daniel Attias	David Fury & Brent Fletcher	Hurley	March 2, 2005	18.85
Hurley wins the lottery using numbers he heard in the Santa Rosa psych ward, but he and his loved ones start to suffer from bad luck. He goes to the ward to talk to the ex-Navy numbers man, who explains that he heard them while serving with a man in Australia. Hurley meets the man's wife, who explains that he committed suicide and picked up a transmission repeating the numbers during service. In the present, Hurley notices the numbers on Rousseau's documents and sets out to find her. She explains that she and her team were drawn to the island by the transmission, and after they died, she changed the transmission to her distress call. Charlie asks him why he has been so stressed and opens up about his addiction to try and get him to reciprocate. When Hurley admits he is rich, Charlie storms off, believing it to be a joke, and the numbers are shown engraved in the side of the hatch.
19	19	"Deus Ex Machina"	Robert Mandel	Carlton Cuse & Damon Lindelof	Locke	March 30, 2005	17.75
Before his paralysis, Locke is approached by his long-lost father, Anthony Cooper. An ailing Cooper subtly guilts Locke into giving up his kidney, only to learn after the surgery that it was a con to keep Cooper alive. In the present, Locke has a nightmare about a Beechcraft crashing in the jungle and losing the use of his legs, the latter of which starts to happen as he takes Boone to find the Beechcraft. They discover the dead body of an armed Nigerian priest, leading them to the Beechcraft. With Locke unable to climb, Boone goes alone and finds Virgin Mary statues with heroin inside. He sends a distress call out on the radio, only for the man on the other end to also identify himself as a survivor of Flight 815 crash before the Beechcraft falls, severely wounding Boone. Locke dumps him at the camp before fleeing to the hatch, where he pounds on it in frustration until a light turns on.
20	20	"Do No Harm"	Stephen Williams	Janet Tamaro	Jack	April 6, 2005	17.12
Jack marries his former patient Sarah Wagner, and Christian gives him advice on writing his vows before the ceremony. In the present, Sayid takes Shannon on a date while Jack sends Kate to get medical supplies from Sawyer. On the way back, she discovers Claire going into labor. Jack instructs Charlie and Kate on how to deliver the baby. Unable to find matching blood donors for Boone, he gives him his O-negative blood but realizes it is seeping out of Boone's destroyed leg. Before he can amputate it, Boone asks him to let him die after revealing the hatch's existence and contradicting the story Locke told about his injury. Claire gives birth to a boy and Jack informs a returning Shannon of Boone's death, then goes to find Locke.
21	21	"The Greater Good"	David Grossman	Leonard Dick	Sayid	May 4, 2005	17.20
Sayid is detained by the CIA and offered Nadia's location in exchange for him infiltrating a Sydney terrorist cell. He meets his old friend Essam Tasir, who is chosen to do a suicide bombing that the CIA tells Sayid to let happen so they can find the cell's explosives. He tells Essam of his deception, who commits suicide. The CIA point him to Nadia in California, but he delays his flight by a day so he can claim and bury Essam. In the present, Locke tries to eulogize Boone at his funeral, leaving Shannon furious. She asks Sayid to kill him, and as he leads Locke into the jungle, he admits that he was the one who attacked him but convinces him of his innocence regarding Boone. Shannon steals a gun and tries to kill Locke, but he is saved by Sayid, who later demands he be taken to the hatch.
22	22	"Born to Run"	Tucker Gates	Story by : Javier Grillo-Marxuach; Teleplay by : Edward Kitsis & Adam Horowitz	Kate	May 11, 2005	17.10
Kate returns to her hometown to visit her ailing mother Diane Janssen and reconnects with her old boyfriend Tom Brennan. They dig up a time capsule with the toy plane inside and Kate sneaks into her mother's hospital room, who rejects her and calls for help. She and Tom flee, but he is killed by police and she abandons the plane. In the present, Locke shows Jack the hatch, and Walt, somehow aware of it, warns him not to open it. Michael is poisoned as he prepares to launch the raft. Believing Kate is setting him up to be blamed so she can take his spot, Sawyer reveals her criminal history and she admits she was Mars's prisoner. Jack realizes Sun was accidentally responsible, trying to make Jin ill instead so he would not leave. Walt admits to Michael that he burnt the raft, and Sun and Kate discuss the poisoning, implying that Kate manipulated her to do it.
23	23	"Exodus (Part 1)"	Jack Bender	Damon Lindelof & Carlton Cuse	various	May 18, 2005	18.62
On the day of the flight, Jack meets passenger Ana Lucia Cortez at a bar, Mars explains to customs that he lured Kate out of hiding by stashing the plane in the bank, and Sawyer's name is revealed as "James Ford" when he is detained. In the present, Rousseau tells the survivors that the Others are coming, explaining that they kidnapped Alex sixteen years ago. Jack posits hiding in the hatch from them, and Rousseau takes them to the Black Rock, a crashed ship, to get dynamite. They are attacked by the monster, which Rousseau explains acts as a security system for the island. Sawyer tells Jack that he met Christian and that he expressed remorse over him, Walt leaves Vincent with Shannon to help with her grief over Boone, and the Kwons reconcile. Michael, Walt, Jin and Sawyer leave on the raft.
24	24	"Exodus (Parts 2 & 3)"	Jack Bender	Damon Lindelof & Carlton Cuse	various	May 25, 2005	20.71
25	25	"Exodus (Parts 2 & 3)"	Jack Bender	Damon Lindelof & Carlton Cuse	various	May 25, 2005	20.71
Woo-Jung's agent confronts Jin at the airport and warns him not to run, while Michael calls his mother and asks her to raise Walt instead. In the present, Locke is attacked by the monster and tells Jack to let him die. Kate attacks it with dynamite, revealing it to be a cloud of sentient black smoke. Jack confronts Locke, who professes his belief in fate, stating the difference between them as a "man of faith" and a "man of science." Rousseau steals Claire's baby Aaron and Charlie pursues her, passing the Beechcraft along the way. He finds her trying to give Aaron to the Others, having heard that they were looking for "the boy" and hoping to trade him for Alex. Charlie takes him back and keeps one of the Virgin Mary statues. The raft encounters a boat, only for its occupants to kidnap Walt, "the boy," before shooting Sawyer and blowing the raft up. Hurley notices the numbers on the hatch and unsuccessfully tries to stop the detonation, which opens it.

== Home media release ==
Lost: The Complete First Season was released as a widescreen seven-disc Region 1 DVD box set on September 6, 2005, two weeks before the premiere of the second season. It was distributed by Walt Disney Studios Home Entertainment. In addition to all the episodes that had aired, it included several DVD extras such as episode commentaries, behind-the-scenes footage and making-of features as well as deleted scenes, deleted flashback scenarios and a blooper reel. The season was subsequently released on Blu-ray Disc on June 16, 2009.

The same set was released on November 30, 2005, in Region 4, and on January 16, 2006, in the United Kingdom. For the region 2 release, the season was split into two releases, with part 1 (episodes 1–12) released on October 31, 2005, and part 2 (episodes 13–25) and the complete season set on January 16, 2006.

Lost: The Complete First Season
Set details			Special features		
25 episodes; 7-disc set; 1.78:1 aspect ratio; Subtitles: English; English (Dolby Digital 5.1 Surround) – DVD; English (DTS-HD Master Audio 5.1 Surround) – Blu-ray; Audio Commentaries; Runtime: 1074 minutes			Audio commentaries; "Pilot: Part 1" by J. J. Abrams, Damon Lindelof, and Bryan Burk; "Pilot: Part 2" by J. J. Abrams, Damon Lindelof, and Bryan Burk; "Walkabout" by Jack Bender, David Fury, and Terry O'Quinn; "The Moth" by Damon Lindelof, Bryan Burk and Dominic Monaghan; "Hearts and Minds" by Carlton Cuse, Javier Grillo-Marxuach, Maggie Grace and Ian Somerhalder; Departure; The Genesis of Lost; Designing a Disaster; Before They Were Lost; Audition Tapes; Welcome to Oahu: The Making of the Pilot; The Art of Matthew Fox; Lost @ ComiCon; Tales from the Island; Lost: On Location; On Set with Jimmy Kimmel; Backstage with Drive Shaft; Lost Revealed; The Lost Flashbacks; Deleted scenes; Bloopers from the Set; Live from the Museum of Television and Radio; 3 Easter Eggs		
Release dates
United States; Canada	Mexico; Australia	Japan	United Kingdom		
United States; Canada	Mexico; Australia	Japan	Part 1	Part 2	Complete
September 6, 2005	November 30, 2005	August 2, 2006	October 31, 2005	January 16, 2006	
