= Whatever Happened, Happened =

- Lost episode
- An injured Ben is brought to Richard Alpert.
- Episode no.: Season 5 Episode 11
- Directed by: Bobby Roth
- Written by: Damon Lindelof; Carlton Cuse
- Production code: 511
- Original air date: April 1, 2009
- Running time: 42 minutes

Guest appearances
- Nestor Carbonell as Richard Alpert; Kim Dickens as Cassidy Phillips; Doug Hutchison as Horace Goodspeed; Susan Duerden as Carole Littleton; Sterling Beaumon as Young Ben Linus; Patrick Fischler as Phil; Jon Gries as Roger Linus; William Blanchette as Aaron; Jim Templar as Baxter; Sebastian Siegel as Erik; Candace Scholz as Debra; Susan King as sweet young woman; Miko Franconi as Sam; Scott Moura as Manager; Olivia Vickery as Clementine Phillips

Episode chronology
← Previous "He's Our You"	Next → "Dead Is Dead"
- Lost season 5

"Whatever Happened, Happened" is the 11th television episode of the fifth season of ABC's Lost. The 97th episode of the show overall, "Whatever Happened, Happened" aired April 1, 2009, on ABC in the United States. The episode was written by executive producers/show runners Damon Lindelof & Carlton Cuse and directed by "The Man Behind the Curtain" director Bobby Roth.

In 1977, Kate Austen (Evangeline Lilly) goes to extreme measures to save young Benjamin Linus (Sterling Beaumon) when Jack Shephard (Matthew Fox) refuses to help. In flashbacks, Kate takes care of Sawyer's (Josh Holloway) favor and begins to tell the truth to protect Aaron (William Blanchette).

== Plot ==
=== Flashbacks ===
Shortly after the Oceanic six's rescue, (Note: As depicted in There's No Place Like Home.) Kate Austen and a baby Aaron visit Cassidy, (Note: Kate originally met Cassidy in Left Behind.) who is an ex-girlfriend of James "Sawyer" Ford. Kate gives Cassidy and Sawyer's daughter Clementine (Olivia Vickery) money from the severance pay from Oceanic. (Note: An errand asked by Sawyer in There's No Place Like Home.) Cassidy deduces that Aaron is not Kate's baby, prompting her to tell her the truth about everything that happened on the island. Cassidy eventually leads Kate to realize that the reason she took Aaron as her own, is because Kate needed him in order to get over her emotional attachment to Sawyer. After the survivors' confrontation with Ben, (Note: As depicted in This Place is Death.) Kate momentarily loses Aaron in a supermarket. She recovers him from a woman who bears a strong resemblance to Claire Littleton (Emilie de Ravin), Aaron's mother. After this, she decides to return to the island with the others who left. She leaves Aaron in the care of Carole Littleton (Susan Duerden), Aaron's biological grandmother. Kate also tells Carole that she is returning to the island to find Carole's daughter, Claire, and bring her home.

=== 1977 ===
After Sayid shoots a young Ben, (Note: As depicted in He's Our You.) Jin-Soo Kwon (Daniel Dae Kim) wakes up and notices the situation. He brings Ben to the barracks so that his injuries can be treated by Juliet Burke (Elizabeth Mitchell). Juliet is unable to perform the necessary surgery on Ben and sends James "Sawyer" Ford (Josh Holloway) to retrieve Jack Shephard (Matthew Fox), a spinal surgeon. Meanwhile, Hugo "Hurley" Reyes (Jorge Garcia) and Miles Straume (Ken Leung) debate the nature of time travel. Hurley is convinced that they have changed the past, as in Back to the Future, but Miles tells him that these events always happened in the past. Hurley, however, points that an older Ben didn't recognize Sayid when he was tortured in 2004, (Note: As depicted in One of Them.) as the man who shot him as a kid. Jack, knowing what Ben does in the future, refuses to help, saying that "he already saved him once". (Note: As depicted in Not in Portland.) This drives Kate Austen (Evangeline Lilly) to do everything she can to help Ben.

Kate goes to the sick bay where Ben is being treated and donates her blood because she is a universal donor. She strikes up a conversation with Ben's father, Roger (Jon Gries), who is upset that Ben stole his keys and freed Sayid from the jail. Once it becomes clear that Ben will succumb to his injuries without further intervention, Kate decides to take Ben to the Others, the island's native population. Sawyer comes to Kate's aid and they bring Ben to Richard Alpert (Nestor Carbonell), who warns them that if he treats Ben, he will not remember what has happened and will never be the same again. They agree anyway. Another Other urges Richard to inform "Ellie" of his intentions and implies that "Charles" will not be pleased if he finds out, but Richard says he doesn't answer to either of them. Richard then carries Ben into the temple. (Note: Originally seen in This Place is Death.)

=== 2007 ===
After being knocked out unconscious by Sun, (Note: As depicted in Namaste.) Ben (Michael Emerson) wakes up in the infirmary, (Note: Ben was depicted being in the infirmary in The Life and Death of Jeremy Bentham.) and is greeted by John Locke (Terry O'Quinn), who welcomes him back to "the land of the living".
