= Lost season 5 =

Season of television series

Lost
- Season 5
- DVD cover
- Showrunners: Damon Lindelof; Carlton Cuse
- Starring: Naveen Andrews; Henry Ian Cusick; Jeremy Davies; Michael Emerson; Matthew Fox; Jorge Garcia; Josh Holloway; Daniel Dae Kim; Yunjin Kim; Ken Leung; Evangeline Lilly; Rebecca Mader; Elizabeth Mitchell; Terry O'Quinn
- No. of episodes: 17

Release
- Original network: ABC
- Original release: January 21 – May 13, 2009

Season chronology
- ← Previous; Season 4 Next → Season 6

The fifth season of the American serial drama television series Lost commenced airing on the ABC network in the United States and on A in Canada in January 2009 and concluded with a two-hour season finale on May 13, 2009. The season continues the stories of the survivors of the crash of the fictional Oceanic Airlines Flight 815, after some of them are rescued and those still stranded seemingly disappear to an unknown location and time with the island that they inhabit.

According to Lost's co-creator/executive producer/writer/showrunner Damon Lindelof, the season "is about why [the people who have left the island] need to get back". Lost returned on January 21, 2009, on ABC with a three-hour premiere consisting of a clip-show and two back-to-back new episodes. The remainder of the season aired on Wednesdays at 9:00 pm EST. The season began in the UK and Ireland on January 25, 2009, on Sky1 and RTÉ Two, respectively. The season was released on DVD and Blu-ray Disc under the title Lost: The Complete Fifth Season – The Journey Back, Expanded Edition on December 8, 2009.

== Crew ==
The season was produced by Bad Robot and Grass Skirt Productions and was aired on the American Broadcasting Company network in the United States. The show was primarily filmed in Hawaii with post-production in Los Angeles. Damon Lindelof and Carlton Cuse continued to serve as the showrunners. Lindelof and Cuse's fellow executive producers were co-creator J. J. Abrams, Bryan Burk, Jack Bender, Edward Kitsis and Adam Horowitz. The staff writers were Lindelof, Cuse, Kitsis, Horowitz, co-executive producer Elizabeth Sarnoff, supervising producer Paul Zbyszewski, producer Brian K. Vaughan, co-producer Melinda Hsu Taylor and Kyle Pennington. The regular directors are Bender, co-executive producer Stephen Williams and Paul Edwards.

== Cast ==
From left to right: Ben, Desmond, Hurley, Juliet, Sawyer, Jack, Faraday, Sayid, Sun, Kate, Locke, Jin, and Miles

=== Main ===
The following fourteen actors played main characters and received star billing this season.

==== In 2007 ====
- Naveen Andrews as Sayid Jarrah, a survivor of 815, and one of the Oceanic Six.
- Henry Ian Cusick as Desmond Hume. Around 2001, he entered a solo sailing race. He eventually got ship wrecked on the island. He lived on the island for three years, mostly alone. He is Penny's husband.
- Michael Emerson as Benjamin "Ben" Linus, the former leader of the Others.
- Matthew Fox as Jack Shephard, a survivor of 815 and one of the Oceanic Six.
- Jorge Garcia as Hugo "Hurley" Reyes, a survivor of 815 and one of the Oceanic Six.
- Yunjin Kim as Sun-Hwa Kwon, a survivor of 815 and one of the Oceanic Six. She is Jin's wife.
- Evangeline Lilly as Kate Austen, a survivor of 815 and one of the Oceanic Six.

==== In 1977 ====
- Jeremy Davies as Daniel Faraday, a physicist who arrives on the Kahana. He is Eloise's son.
- Josh Holloway as James "Sawyer" Ford, a survivor of 815.
- Daniel Dae Kim as Jin-Soo Kwon, a survivor of 815 and Sun's husband. He survived the explosion of the Kahana.
- Ken Leung as Miles Straume, a man who arrived on the Kahana, who is a medium.
- Rebecca Mader as Charlotte Lewis, an anthropologist who arrived on the Kahana.
- Elizabeth Mitchell as Juliet Burke, a former Other.

==== Both 2007 and 1977 ====
- Terry O'Quinn as John Locke. He survived 815, but eventually joined the Others.

=== Special guest stars ===
- Malcolm David Kelley plays Walt Lloyd, a survivor of 815 and Michael's son.
- Michelle Rodriguez plays Ana Lucia Cortez, a survivor of 815.

=== Recurring ===
- Sam Anderson as Bernard Nadler, a survivor of 815, who is Rose's husband
- Reiko Aylesworth as Amy, a member of the DHARMA Initiative
- Sterling Beaumon as young Ben Linus
- L. Scott Caldwell as Rose Nadler, a survivor of 815, who is Bernard's wife
- Nestor Carbonell as Richard Alpert, an Other, who does not appear to age
- François Chau as Pierre Chang, a member and leading scientist of the DHARMA Initiative, who is Lara's husband and Miles's father
- Alan Dale as Charles Widmore
- Jeff Fahey as Frank Lapidus
- Melissa Farman as Danielle Rousseau, the only survivor from a team of scientists who were ship wrecked on the island in the 1980s. Originally the actress Mira Furlan played this character. The producers requested that Furlan return for three episodes, but they could not come to a financial agreement. Furlan was not informed about the decision to recast her and was deeply upset.
- Patrick Fischler as Phil, a member of the DHARMA Initiative
- Fionnula Flanagan as Eloise "Ellie" Hawking, an Other, a scientist, and Daniel's mother. Alice Evans plays young Ellie in flashbacks.
- Brad William Henke as Bram, a survivor of Ajira Airways Flight 316
- Tom Irwin as Dan Norton, an attorney who is hired by an unknown person to perform a maternity test on Kate and Aaron
- Leslie Ishii as Lara, a member of the DHARMA Initiative, who is Dr. Chang's wife and Miles's mother
- Eric Lange as Radzinsky, a member of the Dharma Initiative
- William Mapother as Ethan Rom, an Other
- Cheech Marin as David Reyes, who is Hurley's father
- Mark Pellegrino as Jacob, the well known but never seen leader of the Others
- Tania Raymonde as Alexandra "Alex" Rousseau
- Lance Reddick as Matthew Abaddon, a mysterious man
- Zuleikha Robinson as Ilana, a survivor of Ajira Airways Flight 316
- Saïd Taghmaoui as Caesar, a survivor of Ajira Airways Flight 316
- John Terry as Christian Shephard
- Marsha Thomason as Naomi Dorrit, a young woman who arrived to the island on the Kahana
- Sonya Walger as Penelope "Penny" Widmore. She is the daughter of Charles Widmore. She is also the wife of Desmond Hume.
- Titus Welliver as the unnamed nemesis of Jacob.
- Sean Whalen as Neil Frogurt, who previously appeared in the Lost: Missing Pieces mobisodes

== Reception ==
Season 5 received general acclaim. On Rotten Tomatoes, the season has an 90% approval rating, with average rating of 8.8/10, based on 21 reviews. The website's consensus reads, "Though it introduces yet more unanswered questions, Season 5 of Lost also moves quickly, covers more character development, and fleshes out its rich world further for hungry fans." Metacritic gave the season a score of 78 out of 100 based on 17 reviews, making it generally favorable. According to year end lists published by entertainment publications and prominent TV critics, the fifth season of Lost was the second most mentioned show of 2009. Season 5 continued Lost's decline in ratings, with the two-hour season premiere being watched by 11.37 million American viewers; the lowest season premiere in the series' history. Overall, the entire season averaged 11.05 million viewers.

The season was also nominated for five Primetime Emmy Awards, including Outstanding Drama Series, Outstanding Writing for a Drama Series for Carlton Cuse and Damon Lindelof for the episode "The Incident", Outstanding Supporting Actor in a Drama Series for Michael Emerson, Outstanding Single Camera Picture Editing for a Drama Series, and Outstanding Sound Mixing for a Comedy or Drama Series (One Hour). The only winner among the nominees was Emerson, after being nominated for the same award two years previous. Emerson was later nominated at the 67th Golden Globe Awards for Best Performance by an Actor in a Supporting Role in a Series, Mini-Series or Motion Picture Made for Television.

== Episodes ==
"Lost: Destiny Calls", a clip-show recapping the first four seasons preceded the premiere. A second clip show, "Lost: The Story of the Oceanic 6", aired on April 22, 2009 (before the 14th episode of the season, which is the 100th episode of the whole series), and a third, "Lost: A Journey in Time", was aired before the finale on May 13, 2009.

No. overall	No. in season	Title	Directed by	Written by	Featured character(s)	Original release date	U.S. viewers (millions)
87	1	"Because You Left"	Stephen Williams	Damon Lindelof & Carlton Cuse	none	January 21, 2009	11.35
In 1977, "Marvin Candle" (Note: A figure first seen in "Orientation" who appears on several DHARMA instruction tapes.) oversees the construction of the Orchid while Daniel watches from nearby. In the present, the island's residents begin jumping through time as a result of Ben moving the island, (Note: As depicted in "There's No Place Like Home".) and Locke is shot by Ethan Rom in 2001. He jumps forward and finds Richard, who patches him up and warns him that he has to die to bring the Oceanic Six back and stop the time jumps. Going back to 2001, Daniel gets Desmond out of the Swan and orders him to find Daniel's mother at Oxford. In 2007, lawyer Dan Norton demands Kate prove her relation to Aaron Littleton, while Sun tells Charles Widmore that they both want to kill Ben. Sayid is drugged by men when he arrives at a safehouse with Hurley, so he kills them while Hurley is blamed for the murders. Desmond suddenly remembers his encounter with Daniel.
88	2	"The Lie"	Jack Bender	Edward Kitsis & Adam Horowitz	Hurley	January 21, 2009	11.35
Now in 1954, the survivors are attacked by the Others with flaming arrows, killing most of them. Juliet and Sawyer are cornered by military men but are saved when Locke intervenes. In 2007, Hurley takes Sayid to David Reyes. David takes Sayid to Jack, who revives him, while Hurley, the only Six member opposed to lying about the island, tells his mother the truth. Ben visits him and asks him to join the Six in returning to the island. Panicking, Hurley instead turns himself in to the police and falsely confesses to the murders. Ben goes to Eloise Hawking, (Note: A woman who speaks to Desmond about fate during his time flashes, first seen in "Flashes Before Your Eyes".) who tells him she has found the island and gives him three days to return with Locke and the Six.
89	3	"Jughead"	Rod Holcomb	Elizabeth Sarnoff & Paul Zbyszewski	Desmond	January 28, 2009	11.23
Juliet deduces that the military men are Others, and Locke follows a young Widmore to his camp and speaks with Richard, telling him to give his younger self a test of leadership over the Others. (Note: As depicted in "Cabin Fever".) Daniel is captured by a group of Others led by Eloise. Richard accuses the survivors of being the same military who had been testing hydrogen bombs before the Others killed them and took their "Jughead" bomb. Daniel determines that it is leaking radiation and advises Eloise to bury it before the survivors jump back to 2004, where Charlotte collapses from temporal displacement. In 2007, Desmond learns that Daniel's time experiments are funded by Widmore, from whom he gets the address of Daniel's mother.
90	4	"The Little Prince"	Stephen Williams	Brian K. Vaughan & Melinda Hsu Taylor	Kate	February 4, 2009	11.01
As Locke leads the group to the Orchid, believing they can solve the time flashes there, they jump to 2004, where Sawyer witnesses Kate delivering Aaron. (Note: As depicted in "Do No Harm".) The survivors take a boat to the Orchid but are shot at by another boat, only to jump to 1988 during a storm. That storm causes a team of French scientists to wash up on the island, who find Jin in a Kahana life raft along the way. When he wakes, a pregnant scientist introduces herself as Danielle Rousseau. In 2007, Widmore sends Sun a gun while Sayid fights off an orderly who tries to drug him. Norton meets with Ben to discuss getting Hurley freed from prison. Jack and Kate meet with Ben, and Kate accuses him of using Norton to take Aaron. Sun watches from nearby.
91	5	"This Place Is Death"	Paul Edwards	Edward Kitsis & Adam Horowitz	Sun & Jin	February 11, 2009	9.82
The smoke monster attacks Rousseau's group and Jin jumps forward several weeks, where Rousseau kills her team after they contract an illness that makes them violent. After another flash, he reunites with the survivors. As the flashes render Charlotte immobile, she instructs Locke how to find the wheel if the Orchid has not yet been built. Before dying, she admits to Daniel that she grew up on the island and spent her life trying to return despite a man (who she believes was Daniel) telling her not to as a child. Jin gives Locke his wedding ring to convince Sun that he is dead and dissuade her from returning. Christian Shephard instructs Locke to bring the Six back and find Eloise; then Locke resets the wheel, stopping the flashes but trapping the remaining survivors in 1974. In 2007, Ben stops Sun from killing him by asserting that Jin is alive and giving her the ring as proof. She, Ben, and Jack meet Desmond as they go to see Eloise, who is revealed as Daniel's mother.
92	6	"316"	Stephen Williams	Damon Lindelof & Carlton Cuse	Jack	February 18, 2009	11.41
Eloise takes them to a DHARMA station that is used to predict where the island will be, explaining that the circumstances of the Oceanic Flight 815 crash need to be recreated as closely as possible, including giving Locke's body something of Christian's. She also gives Jack Locke's suicide note. Jack puts Christian's shoes on Locke's feet. The Six meet aboard Ajira Flight 316, where Sayid is in the custody of a woman, Ilana Verdansky. An injured Ben boards the plane, and Lapidus is the pilot. Jack reads Locke's note to him, which says, "I wish you had believed me." The plane crashes on the island, and Jack, Kate, and Hurley encounter Jin, wearing a DHARMA jumpsuit.
93	7	"The Life and Death of Jeremy Bentham"	Jack Bender	Carlton Cuse & Damon Lindelof	Locke	February 25, 2009	10.05
Two months before his death, Locke arrives in Tunisia and Widmore helps him locate the Six, assigning Matthew Abaddon to assist him. His friends reject him, and he decides to not ask Walt. He asks after Helen Norwood and is taken to her grave, where Abaddon is shot and killed. Locke gets in a car crash while fleeing and is taken to Jack's hospital, where he tells him about seeing Christian but fails to convince him. Locke decides to kill himself, but Ben, having killed Abaddon, intervenes and tells him their conversation changed Jack's mind. When Locke mentions Eloise, Ben kills him and stages it as suicide. In the present, Flight 316 crashes on Hydra Island and Locke comes back to life. A passenger notes that Jack, Hurley, Kate, and Sayid vanished from the flight before the crash, and Locke finds Ben in the sick bay.
94	8	"LaFleur"	Mark Goldman	Elizabeth Sarnoff & Kyle Pennington	Sawyer	March 4, 2009	10.65
Stuck in 1974, Sawyer's group kills a pair Others to save DHARMA member Amy from them. She takes them to the Barracks, where Sawyer claims they survived a shipwreck on the island, though Horace Goodspeed asks them to leave on the submarine the next day. Richard confronts Goodspeed on the dead Others and Sawyer intervenes, privately telling him about burying the Jughead to earn his trust and defuse the situation. Goodspeed allows them to stay longer, and by 1977, has married Amy while the survivors join DHARMA. She goes into labor and Juliet, in love and living with Sawyer, delivers her son, Ethan. Jin, who has been doing secret recon of the island, informs Sawyer that he has found their friends.
95	9	"Namaste"	Jack Bender	Paul Zbyszewski & Brian K. Vaughan	none	March 18, 2009	9.40
Sawyer introduces his friends as new DHARMA recruits. Jin and Stuart Radzinsky catch Sayid near the Barracks. Radzinsky wants to kill him, but Sawyer intervenes and has him jailed. A young Ben brings him a meal. In the present, Ben sneaks away from the group and Sun chases him, having him lead her to a boat before incapacitating him. Lapidus goes to the island with her, where they find Christian in the ruins of the Barracks. When Sun asks about Jin, he shows her a DHARMA recruitment picture from 1977 with her friends in it, explaining that Jin is with them.
96	10	"He's Our You"	Greg Yaitanes	Edward Kitsis & Adam Horowitz	Sayid	March 25, 2009	9.04
After some of the group leaves to see Eloise, Sayid goes to a bar and meets Ilana, who seduces him. Actually a bounty hunter, she detains him on behalf of the family of one of his victims and they board Flight 316. In 1977, Sayid refuses Sawyer's offer to pretend to be an Other defecting to DHARMA and is given to the initiative's torturer, who drugs him with truth serum, though they do not believe his claims of being from the future. The leaders of DHARMA vote to execute him and he tricks Ben into freeing him, shooting him when they escape.
97	11	"Whatever Happened, Happened"	Bobby Roth	Carlton Cuse & Damon Lindelof	Kate	April 1, 2009	9.57
Kate visits Cassidy Phillips at Sawyer's behest (Note: As depicted in "There's No Place Like Home".) and gives her and their daughter some of the settlement money. When Cassidy guesses that Aaron is not Kate's son, she explains what happened on the island, and Cassidy wonders if Kate adopted him to get over Sawyer. Kate leaves Aaron in the care of Carole Littleton and promises to find Claire when she returns to the island. In 1977, Jin rushes Ben to the Barracks, but Jack refuses to operate on him. Sawyer gives him to Kate, who sneaks him to Richard. He agrees to save Ben's life but warns that the procedure will make him forget the incident and alter his personality. Despite warnings from a comrade that Widmore would be opposed, Richard brings him to the temple.
98	12	"Dead Is Dead"	Stephen Williams	Brian K. Vaughan & Elizabeth Sarnoff	Ben	April 8, 2009	8.57
Ben takes the infant Alex Rousseau from her mother despite Widmore's orders to kill them both. He expels Widmore from the island for having Penny Widmore with an outsider, and in 2007, tracks her down to kill her, shooting Desmond in the process. The sight of her and Desmond's son Charlie stops him, and Desmond brutalizes him. In the present, Ben and Locke go to the Barracks, where Lapidus heads back to Hydra Island and Sun goes with them to the temple. Lapidus is restrained by Ilana upon his return when he cannot answer "what lies in the shadow of the statue?" Locke directs Ben to enter the temple underground, where the monster shows him visions of Alex. Alex herself warns him to follow and obey Locke.
99	13	"Some Like It Hoth"	Jack Bender	Melinda Hsu Taylor & Greggory Nations	Miles	April 15, 2009	9.23
Miles's dying mother tells him that his uncaring father, Pierre Chang, died when he was a baby. He is contacted by Naomi Dorrit and hired under Widmore. He is later confronted by a man on Flight 316 and asked the statue question, being warned to stay away from the island when he cannot answer. In 1977, DHARMA security Phil confronts Sawyer, having seen footage of him taking Ben to Kate, so Sawyer incapacitates him. Miles is tasked with transporting a man who died building the Swan to Chang (or "Marvin Candle"). Hurley encourages him to talk to Chang, but Miles rebuffs him despite later spying on Chang reading to the infant version of him. Daniel, away on research business since 1974, returns to the island.
100	14	"The Variable"	Paul Edwards	Edward Kitsis & Adam Horowitz	Faraday	April 29, 2009	9.04
Eloise and Widmore push Daniel to continue his time research and go with Naomi to the island. In 2007, Eloise and Widmore meet when they visit Penny in the hospital and argue about Daniel, revealed to be their son. In 1977, after telling a young Charlotte to leave the island, Daniel tries to explain to Chang that the electromagnetic energy under the Swan will become unstable, but he does not believe his stories of the future even when he tries to reveal that Miles is his son. He takes Jack and Kate to visit the Others, but they get in a gunfight with Radzinsky while trying to leave, who hurries to get Sawyer and finds Phil. Daniel explains his plan to detonate the Jughead inside the energy, defusing it and preventing it from crashing Flight 815 in 2004. He enters an Others camp and demands to see Eloise, only to shot by her for intruding. He realizes in his dying moments that she sent him to the island knowing he would be killed by her.
101	15	"Follow the Leader"	Stephen Williams	Paul Zbyszewski & Elizabeth Sarnoff	none	May 6, 2009	8.70
Jack manipulates Eloise's guilt over Daniel to get help with enacting his plan. Sayid and Richard join them, while Kate, opposed, leaves and is captured by DHARMA. Convinced that Daniel's friends are from the future, Chang evacuates the women and children from the Barracks, which Miles witnesses and realizes he only left his family to keep them safe. Sawyer draws a map to the Others's camp in exchange for being put on the evacuation sub with Juliet and Kate. In 2007, Locke reestablishes his leadership over the Others and takes Richard into the jungle so he can remove Ethan's bullet from Locke's past self, then orders the Others to come with him to Jacob, privately telling Ben that he plans to kill him.
102	16	"The Incident"	Jack Bender	Damon Lindelof & Carlton Cuse	Jacob	May 13, 2009	9.43
103	17	"The Incident"	Jack Bender	Damon Lindelof & Carlton Cuse	Jacob	May 13, 2009	9.43
In 1867, the "Man in Black" vows to find a "loophole" that allows him to kill Jacob. Jacob is shown meeting survivors at various points in their lives, including reviving Locke when he dies after being pushed out a window (Note: As depicted in "The Man from Tallahassee".) and giving Hurley a guitar case to take on Flight 316. In 2007, Ilana's group burns Jacob's cabin after finding it desecrated, while the Others travel to the remains of a statue of Tawaret, where Ben admits to Locke that he has never seen Jacob. The two go into the statue and meet Jacob just as Ilana's group arrives. When Richard answers the statue question ("he who shall save us all"), they show him the contents of a box they took on the flight: the body of the real Locke. In Locke's form, the Man in Black has Ben stab Jacob and burns his body. In 1977, Sawyer escapes from the sub and goes to stop Jack. Sayid rebuilds the Jughead into a portable device and Hurley rescues them from a shootout at the Barracks, where Sayid is shot by Roger Linus. Sawyer intercepts them and Jack admits he wants to reset for another chance with Kate. The survivors attack the Swan site and Jack drops the bomb down a shaft, but instead of detonating, it starts drawing metal into the hole, dragging Juliet into it. Barely surviving the fall, she hits the bomb until it explodes.

== Home media release ==
The DVD and Blu-ray box set of season 5 was released on December 8, 2009, in Region 1, on October 21, 2009, in Region 4, and on October 26, 2009, in Region 2. It includes all episodes in the season and bonus features including:

Lost: The Complete Fifth Season – The Journey Back, Expanded Edition
Set details		Special features	
17 episodes; 5-disc set; 1.78:1 aspect ratio; Subtitles: English, Spanish, French; English (Dolby Digital 5.1 Surround) – DVD; English (DTS-HD Master Audio 5.1 Surround), Spanish & French (DTS 5.1 Surround) – Blu-ray		Audio commentaries on: "Because You Left" by Damon Lindelof and Carlton Cuse; "He's Our You" by Edward Kitsis and Adam Horowitz; "Lost on Location"; "Building 23 & Beyond"; "An Epic Day with Richard Alpert"; "Making Up for Lost Time"; "Mysteries of the Universe: The DHARMA Initiative"; "Bloopers"; "Deleted Scenes"; "Lost Starter Kit"; Blu-ray exclusive; "Lost 100"; "Lost University"	
Release dates
United States; Canada	Australia	United Kingdom	Mexico
December 8, 2009	October 21, 2009	October 26, 2009	October 30, 2009
