= He's Our You =

- Lost episode
- Sayid Jarrah meets the Dharma Initiative's torturer.
- Episode no.: Season 5 Episode 10
- Directed by: Greg Yaitanes
- Written by: Edward Kitsis; Adam Horowitz
- Production code: 510
- Original air date: March 25, 2009
- Running time: 42 minutes

Guest appearances
- Doug Hutchison as Horace Goodspeed; Zuleikha Robinson as Ilana; Reiko Aylesworth as Amy; Sterling Beaumon as Young Ben Linus; Patrick Fischler as Phil; Eric Lange as Stuart Radzinsky; Jon Gries as Roger Linus; William Sanderson as Oldham; Sayed Badreya as Hassan Jarrah; Xavier Raabe-Manupule as Omer Jarrah; Michael Hardy as Floyd; Dmitri Boudrine as Ivan Andropov; Joe Toro as Bartender; Anthony Keyvan as Young Sayid Jarrah

Episode chronology
← Previous "Namaste"	Next → "Whatever Happened, Happened"
- Lost season 5

"He's Our You" is the tenth television episode of the fifth season of ABC's Lost. The 96th episode of the show overall, "He's Our You" aired on March 25, 2009, on ABC in the United States. The episode was written by executive producers Edward Kitsis & Adam Horowitz and directed by "Special" director Greg Yaitanes.

In 1977, Sayid Jarrah's (Naveen Andrews) presence among the DHARMA Initiative makes them anxious; he is interrogated, and admits everything he knows. In flashbacks, Sayid struggles after his purpose off the island is cut short.

== Plot ==
=== Flashbacks ===
As a child, Sayid watches as his older brother is forced by his father to kill a chicken as a rite of passage. He is unable to do it, so Sayid does it for him; this greatly pleases Sayid's father. While working for Ben (Michael Emerson), (Note: Originally depicted in The Economist and The Shape of Things to Come.) Sayid kills a man in Moscow. This is the last man on Ben's hit list, leaving Sayid uncertain about how to continue living his life. After John Locke (Terry O'Quinn) dies, (Note: As depicted in The Life and Death of Jeremy Bentham.) Ben visits Sayid and encourages him to go to California, telling him of Locke's death and Hurley being watched. (Note: As depicted in There's No Place Like Home.) Ben refers to Sayid as "a killer". Following the confrontation between the survivors and Ben, (Note: As depicted in This Place is Death.) Sayid meets Ilana (Zuleikha Robinson) at a bar; she skillfully seduces him and then takes him into her custody at gunpoint. She turns out to be a bounty hunter who has been employed to take Sayid to Guam by the family of Peter Avellino (Armando Pucci), who Sayid previously killed for Ben on a golf course. (Note: As depicted in The Economist.) After seeing some of the Oceanic Six preparing to board the same flight, he begs her to take the next plane, but she refuses. On the plane, after he sees Ben board, he asks Ilana if she is working for Ben. Sayid describes Ben as a monster and Ilana asks Sayid why she would work for a man like Ben. Sayid replies, "I did."

=== 1977 ===
Sayid Jarrah (Naveen Andrews) is in the Dharma Initiative's jail. (Note: As depicted in Namaste.) He is questioned by Horace Goodspeed (Doug Hutchison), Dharma's leader; Radzinsky (Eric Lange), Dharma's head of research; and James "Sawyer" Ford (Josh Holloway), who, under the alias of LaFleur, is Dharma's head of security. Sayid does not say anything and is later visited by a twelve-year-old Ben Linus (Sterling Beaumon). Ben's father (Jon Gries) witnesses this and assaults Ben for bringing Sayid food. Sayid is later confronted one-on-one by Sawyer, who in an effort to save Sayid, tries to convince Sayid to give a false confession of being a defector from the island's native population, the Others. Sayid refuses and is subsequently taken to Oldham (William Sanderson), Dharma's resident interrogation expert ("He's our you," as Sawyer describes him to Sayid). Oldham gives Sayid a truth serum which forces Sayid to reveal his knowledge of Dharma's stations, including the future Swan Station, and that he has previously been to the island. However, he also tells them that he is from the future, which discredits his story. Upon returning to the jail, Sayid is once again visited by Ben, who pledges to free Sayid because Ben wishes to join the Others. That evening, several members of the Dharma Initiative take a vote to decide whether to execute Sayid. After an impassioned statement from new mother Amy (Reiko Aylesworth), they all vote in favor of execution. Sawyer attempts to let Sayid escape, but Sayid refuses, stating he has found his purpose for returning to the island.

Meanwhile, at the barracks, Juliet Burke (Elizabeth Mitchell) expresses her concern to Sawyer that their relationship will be jeopardized because of Kate Austen's (Evangeline Lilly) return to the island. Kate learns of their relationship from Hugo "Hurley" Reyes (Jorge Garcia). Later in the evening, Sawyer goes to Kate's house and asks her why she came back to the island. Before she can answer, however, a flaming Dharma van crashes into one of the houses. While everyone is distracted by the fire, Ben helps Sayid escape from the jail. They run into Jin-Soo Kwon (Daniel Dae Kim) during their escape, so Sayid knocks Jin out and steals his gun. After saying to Ben "You were right, I am a killer," Sayid reluctantly shoots Ben in the chest and runs off to the night.
