= The Little Prince (Lost) =

- Lost episode
- In 1988, Jin-Soo Kwon (Daniel Dae Kim) meets Robert (Guillaume Dabinpons) and Danielle Rousseau (Melissa Farman)'s science team.
- Episode no.: Season 5 Episode 4
- Directed by: Stephen Williams
- Written by: Brian K. Vaughan; Melinda Hsu Taylor
- Production code: 504
- Original air date: February 4, 2009
- Running time: 42 minutes

Guest appearances
- Susan Duerden as Carole Littleton; Tom Irwin as Dan Norton; William Blanchette as Aaron; Emerson Brooks as Tony Nagy; Stephanie Niznik as Dr. Evelyn Ariza; Melissa Farman as Young Danielle Rousseau; Guillaume Dabinpons as Robert Rousseau; Marc Menard as Montand; Bruno Bruni as Brennan; Ane Tranetzki as Bellman; Alexandra Tabas as Nadine; Chris Marvin as Lacombe

Episode chronology
← Previous "Jughead"	Next → "This Place Is Death"
- Lost season 5

"The Little Prince" is the fourth television episode of the fifth season of ABC's Lost. The 90th episode of the show overall, "The Little Prince" aired on February 4, 2009, on ABC in the United States, being simulcast on A in Canada. The episode was written by producer Brian K. Vaughan and co-producer Melinda Hsu Taylor and directed by Stephen Williams.

In 2007, Kate Austen tries to find out who wants custody of Aaron. Benjamin Linus and Jack Shephard continue their quest to reunite the "Oceanic Six". At the island, James "Sawyer" Ford and John Locke devise a plan which might possibly stop the time flashes, but encounter hostiles; while Jin-Soo Kwon, revealed to be alive, meets the younger Danielle Rousseau in 1988.

== Plot ==
The episode opens with a flashback of Kate Austen (Evangeline Lilly) and Jack Shephard (Matthew Fox) on Penny Widmore's (Sonya Walger) boat, following their rescue in early January 2005. (Note: As depicted in "There's No Place Like Home".) Kate convinces Jack that when they return home, they should claim that Aaron (William Blanchette) is Kate's biological son, while in fact his mother is Claire Littleton (Emilie de Ravin).

=== On the Mainland ===
In late 2007, (Note: After the events of '"The Lie".) Kate leaves Aaron in the care of Sun-Hwa Kwon (Yunjin Kim) in order to confront attorney Dan Norton (Tom Irwin), who is pursuing a maternity test for Kate and Aaron. Sun receives a package with a gun and pictures of Ben and Jack. Norton tells Kate that he is going to meet his client later and Kate decides to follow him. Meanwhile, Ben Linus (Michael Emerson) meets up with Jack and Sayid Jarrah (Naveen Andrews) at the hospital. An orderly armed with a tranquilizer gun attacks Sayid, but Sayid overcomes him, and when he finds Kate's address in his wallet he, Ben and Jack suspect Kate is the next target. The three decide to split up, with Jack going after Kate, and Sayid and Ben going to the prison where Hugo "Hurley" Reyes (Jorge Garcia) is being held.

Jack and Kate follow Norton to a motel where he meets with Claire's mother, Carole (Susan Duerden). Once Norton leaves, Jack confronts Carole, who is only in Los Angeles to collect on a successful suit against Oceanic Airlines and has nothing to do with the maternity test. At the prison, Ben meets with Norton, who is also acting as Hurley's lawyer and is confident that he can have Hurley released the following morning. Ben and Sayid meet up with Jack and Kate, where Kate figures out that Ben has hired Norton to do the maternity test, while Sun, armed with a gun, watches the conversation from a car with Aaron.

=== On the island ===
Following the latest time jump, (Note: As depicted in "Jughead".) Charlotte is still unconscious. She eventually wakes up and the group of her, Daniel Faraday (Jeremy Davies), Miles Straume (Ken Leung), John Locke (Terry O'Quinn), James "Sawyer" Ford (Josh Holloway) and Juliet Burke (Elizabeth Mitchell) leave to travel to the Dharma Initiative Orchid Station, where Locke believes he can find a way to leave the island. Several other characters begin to show similar symptoms to Charlotte's. Daniel informs them that the nose bleeds may have something to do with one's time spent on the island; however, this makes no sense to several of the group since Charlotte, who has the worst symptoms, has only been on the island for a few days. The latest time jump brings the group to nighttime, where Locke observes in the distance the light coming out of the hatch. (Note: As depicted in "Deus Ex Machina".) Following screams, Sawyer witnesses the then-Claire and Kate during Aaron's birth. (Note: As depicted in "Do No Harm".) Another time jump brings them to the future. At their abandoned beach camp, they find a canoe which they use to paddle to the other side of the island. They are attacked by unknown assailants and another time jump brings them to the past, (Note: Revealed to be 1988 in "This Place is Death.) in the middle of a storm that caused a French science team's boat led by Robert (Guillaume Dabinpons) to run aground on the island.

In their emergency raft, the French team, Montand (Marc Menard), Brenan (Bruno Bruni), Lacombe (Chris Marvin), and Nadine (Alexandra Tabas) find Jin-Soo Kwon (Daniel Dae Kim) unconscious floating on flotsam from the freighter that exploded. They land on the island and question Jin after he wakes up. The episode ends with Danielle Rousseau (Melissa Farman) revealing her identity to a befuddled Jin.

== Production ==
"The Little Prince" is the first episode of Lost to be co-written by Melinda Hsu Taylor, who joined the writing staff prior to the start of production on season five. The nocturnal ocean scenes were shot in a swimming pool, which had its bottom covered in black plastic. Over ten thousand gallons of water were used to create the storm. The outrigger canoes were made of painted fiberglass, and had their designs based on ancient Hawaiian canoes.

== Reception ==
The episode gained 12.855 million American viewers. The episode brought in 380,000 viewers in Australia, ranking 33rd for the night.

"The Little Prince" received mostly positive reviews from critics. The A.V. Club's Noel Murray graded the episode a "B+", stating "[...] this episode made good use of Kate at different points on the timeline: showing her now, anxious about losing Aaron, and showing her three years ago on Penny’s boat, prepared to lie for Jack in order to keep Aaron safe, and showing her three years ago on the island, helping Claire bring Aaron into the world. In just a few short scenes, Lost lays the foundation for what that boy means to Kate."
