= Namaste (Lost) =

- Lost episode
- The DHARMA Initiative takes a picture of its new recruits.
- Episode no.: Season 5 Episode 9
- Directed by: Jack Bender
- Written by: Paul Zbyszewski; Brian K. Vaughan
- Production code: 509
- Original air date: March 18, 2009
- Running time: 43 minutes

Guest appearances
- John Terry as Christian Shephard; Jeff Fahey as Frank Lapidus; François Chau as Dr. Pierre Chang; Saïd Taghmaoui as Caesar; Zuleikha Robinson as Ilana; Reiko Aylesworth as Amy; Sterling Beaumon as Young Ben Linus; Patrick Fischler as Phil; Molly McGivern as Rosie; Eric Lange as Stuart Radzinsky; Dan Gauthier as Co-pilot; Sven Lindstrom as Jay

Episode chronology
| ← Previous "LaFleur" | Next → "He's Our You" |
- Lost season 5

"Namaste" is the ninth television episode of the fifth season of ABC's Lost. The 95th episode of the show overall, "Namaste" aired on March 18, 2009, on ABC in the United States, being simulcast on A in Canada. The episode was written by supervising producer Paul Zbyszewski and producer Brian K. Vaughan and directed by executive producer Jack Bender.

In 1977, when Jack Shephard (Matthew Fox), Kate Austen (Evangeline Lilly) and Hugo "Hurley" Reyes (Jorge Garcia) return to the past unannounced, James "Sawyer" Ford (Josh Holloway) further perpetuates his lie to continue to hide their true identities. All that suddenly changes when Sayid Jarrah (Naveen Andrews) is found as well, but is forcefully captured by Jin-Soo Kwon (Daniel Dae Kim) in order to hide the lie. In 2007, Sun-Hwa Kwon (Yunjin Kim), Benjamin Linus (Michael Emerson), Frank Lapidus (Jeff Fahey) and the passengers of the Ajira Airways Flight 316 arrive on the island in the present.

== Plot ==
=== 2007 ===
During the flight of Ajira Airways Flight 316, a transpacific flight piloted by Frank Lapidus (Jeff Fahey), a big light enfolds the plane, causing Jack Shephard (Matthew Fox), Kate Austen (Evangeline Lily), Hugo "Hurley" Reyes (Jorge Garcia) and Sayid Jarrah (Naveen Andrews) to be transported to 1977, (Note: As depicted in 316.) while the rest of the passengers remain in the current year. Lapidus, unable to control the plane, lands it on a runway that was built by the native population of the island known as the Others, and James "Sawyer" Ford and Kate, (Note: As depicted in The Glass Ballerina.) on the small island off the coast of the main island, where the Dharma Initiative Hydra Station is located.

The passengers begin to debate what to do next, with Caesar (Saïd Taghmaoui) suggesting to search the buildings of the island. (Note: As depicted in The Life and Death of Jeremy Bentham.) Former leader of the Others Ben Linus (Michael Emerson) begins to travel to the main island. He is followed by survivor Sun-Hwa Kwon (Yunjin Kim), who believes her husband Jin-Soo Kwon (Daniel Dae Kim) is on the main island, and later Frank. After reaching a group of canoes, Sun knocks Ben out with an oar, (Note: Ben was originally seen knocked out in The Life and Death of Jeremy Bentham.) and travels with Frank to the abandoned barracks of the Dharma Initiative. Waiting there is Christian Shephard (John Terry), who shows Sun and Frank a picture of new recruits to the Dharma Initiative from 1977, including Jack, Kate and Hurley. He also tells her that Jin is with them in 1977.

=== 1977 ===
Sawyer reunites with Jack, Kate, and Hurley, (Note: As depicted in LaFleur.) and explains the situation regarding Dharma and the shifts in time. Sawyer arranges for the three of them to join the Dharma Initiative as new recruits: Jack is assigned janitorial work by Dr. Pierre Chang (François Chau), Hurley is a chef, and Kate works in the motor pool with help from Juliet Burke (Elizabeth Mitchell), who forges the necessary documentation. Juliet also learns that Amy (Reiko Aylesworth) has named her baby Ethan. (Note: Ethan eventually becomes an Other, as seen in Raised by Another.) Meanwhile, Jin travels to the Dharma Initiative Flame Station because he believes that its occupant Radzinsky (Eric Lange) (who has been working on the design of the Swan) will know if Flight 316 crashed on the island. (Note: Radzinsky was originally mentioned in Live Together, Die Alone.) There is no evidence of a plane crashing on the island as, unbeknownst to them, the plane has landed in 2007. Soon, an alarm is set off and Jin finds Sayid Jarrah (Naveen Andrews) wandering in the jungle. After a brief moment of reunion, Jin is forced to act as if Sayid were a Hostile to placate Radzinsky, who would not understand where Sayid really came from. Sawyer is summoned to the Flame and moves Sayid to a jail cell at the Barracks while he decides what to do.

Later in the evening, Jack visits Sawyer and Juliet's house to discuss the situation. James tells Jack that he is in charge and has a different approach to leadership than Jack had with the survivors of Oceanic 815: Sawyer prefers to carefully plan out his actions, as opposed to Jack's more impulsive style of command. Meanwhile, at the jail, an adolescent brings Sayid a sandwich and introduces himself as Ben (Sterling Beaumon).

== Production ==
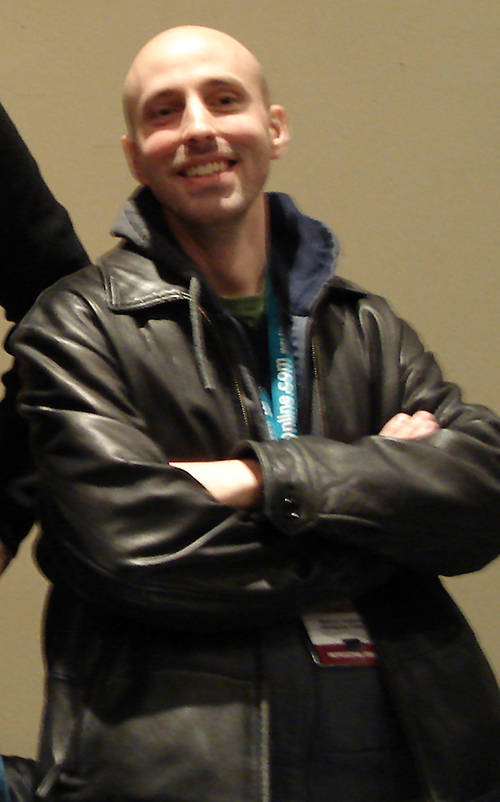
The episode was co-written by Brian K. Vaughan.

The episode was written by supervising producer Paul Zbyszewski and producer Brian K. Vaughan and directed by executive producer Jack Bender. Eric Lange made his first out of seven scheduled guest appearances on the show in this episode as Stuart Radzinsky. Radzinsky had originally been mentioned once in the season 2 finale, making "Namaste" his first full appearance. Lange said that a couple days after his audition, he got a call telling him that he had gotten the role of Radzinsky. In November 2008, he traveled to the set in Hawaii. Lange had been a fan of the show since it started and had always wanted to be a part of it. He said: "To be able to work on something in a capacity like this, it's a dream job. It's one of the most exciting things I've done."

== Reception ==
In Australia, the episode brought in 389,000 viewers, ranking 35th for the night.
