= Outlaws (Lost) =

- Lost episode
- Sawyer hesitates firing his gun.
- Episode no.: Season 1 Episode 16
- Directed by: Jack Bender
- Written by: Drew Goddard
- Cinematography by: John Bartley
- Editing by: Stephen Semel
- Production code: 114
- Original air date: February 16, 2005
- Running time: 42 minutes

Guest appearances
- John Terry as Christian Shephard; Robert Patrick as Hibbs; Stewart Finlay-McLennan as Laurence; Jeff Perry as Frank Duckett; Brittany Perrineau as Mary Jo; Susse Budde as Mary Ford; Gordon Hardie as Young Sawyer; Alex Mason as Bartender

Episode chronology
← Previous "Homecoming"	Next → "...In Translation"
- Lost season 1

"Outlaws" is the 16th episode of the first season of the American drama television series Lost. The episode was directed by Jack Bender and written by Drew Goddard. It first aired on ABC in the United States on February 16, 2005. The character of James "Sawyer" Ford (Josh Holloway) is featured in the episode's flashbacks.

The episode was seen by an estimated 17.87 million household viewers.

== Plot ==
=== Flashbacks ===
Sawyer has a nightmare about the night, as a child, he was told by his mother to hide under his bed while she went to the door to tell his father to leave. In the dream, his father forces his way into the house, kills his mother, sits on the bed Sawyer is hiding under, and kills himself. A former associate, Hibbs (Robert Patrick), tells Sawyer the real Sawyer who ruined his life as a child is now living under the alias Frank Duckett in Australia. Sawyer travels there, buys a gun, and goes to the shrimp shop where Duckett works. He chats with him briefly, but doesn't kill him. Sawyer goes to an Australian bar and happens to meet Christian Shephard (John Terry) who tells Sawyer some people are meant to suffer, and "that's why the Red Sox will never win the damn Series." He says he wishes he had the strength to call his son, say how proud he is of him, and "fix everything", but he is too weak to do it. Christian tells Sawyer to fix the thing that's making him feel bad. Sawyer shoots Frank Duckett, but Frank denies being the real Sawyer, telling Sawyer he owed Hibbs money—Sawyer realizes this is the real reason Hibbs sent him after Duckett. Duckett tells Sawyer "It'll come back around" before dying.

=== On the Island ===
In the middle of the night, Sawyer wakes up to find a giant boar in front of him and it attacks his tent and runs away into the trees, taking Sawyer's tarp with it. Sawyer chases after it, and while he is in the jungle he hears whispering. A louder whisper says "It'll come back around".

In the morning, on Day 30, October 21, 2004, Sawyer talks to Sayid Jarrah (Naveen Andrews) about the voices Sayid heard while he was in the jungle before, and when Sayid asks why he wants to know, Sawyer shrugs it off.

Sawyer is obsessed with finding the boar that attacked him and goes into the jungle with Kate Austen (Evangeline Lilly) to find it. During a drinking game ("I Never..."), they both reveal to each other that they've killed a man. The next morning, on Day 31, the two of them wake up to find that Sawyer's belongings have been ruined while Kate's remain untouched.

John Locke (Terry O'Quinn) joins them and tells them his sister died very young and their foster mother blamed herself, suffering a severe depression. But a few months later, a dog came into the house, without tags or collar. The dog slept in his sister's room, but when his mother died 5 years later, the dog vanished. Locke says his mother believed the dog was his sister who came back to tell her that her death wasn't her fault.

Sawyer catches up to the boar and decides not to kill it, and gives Jack Shephard (Matthew Fox) his gun. Now all the firearms are with Jack, who locks them back in the marshal's case. They start to talk, and Jack says, "that's why the Sox will never win the Series." Sawyer realizes Christian is Jack's father, but does not tell Jack that he met Christian.

== Reception ==
This episode attracted 17.87 million American viewers.
