= This Place Is Death =

- Lost episode
- Sun-Hwa Kwon (Yunjin Kim) confronts Benjamin Linus (Michael Emerson).
- Episode no.: Season 5 Episode 5
- Directed by: Paul Edwards
- Written by: Edward Kitsis; Adam Horowitz
- Production code: 505
- Original air date: February 11, 2009
- Running time: 42 minutes

Guest appearances
- John Terry as Christian Shephard; Fionnula Flanagan as Eloise Hawking; William Blanchette as Aaron; June Kyoko Lu as Mrs. Paik; Melissa Farman as Young Danielle Rousseau; Guillaume Dabinpons as Robert; Marc Menard as Montand; Bruno Bruni Jr. as Brennan; Jaymie Kim as Ji Yeon Kwon; Alexandra Tabas as Nadine; Chris Marvin as Lacombe

Episode chronology
← Previous "The Little Prince"	Next → "316"
- Lost season 5

"This Place Is Death" is the fifth television episode of the fifth season of ABC's Lost. The 91st episode of the show overall, "This Place Is Death" aired on February 11, 2009, on ABC in the United States, being simulcast on A in Canada. The episode was written by executive producers Edward Kitsis and Adam Horowitz and directed by Paul Edwards.

In 2007, Jack Shephard and Benjamin Linus try to convince Sun-Hwa Kwon to return to the island. At the island, Jin-Soo Kwon, having survived the freighter explosion, witnesses the downfall of the science expedition. Meanwhile, John Locke and the group continue to initiate their plan, but must do it quickly, especially due to the deteriorating health of Charlotte Lewis.

== Plot ==
On the island, (Note: After the events of The Little Prince.) Jin-Soo Kwon (Daniel Dae Kim) realizes he's in 1988. He and Danielle Rousseau's (Melissa Farman) science team go in search of a radio tower that is broadcasting the Numbers. They are attacked by the smoke monster, which kills Nadine and drags Montand (Marc Menard) into a tunnel that leads to a temple, severing his arm in the process. Robert Rousseau (Guillaume Dabinpons), Brennan (Bruno Bruni Jr.) and Lacombe follow him into the tunnel, while Jin is able to convince a pregnant Danielle to stay behind. Another time jump brings Jin forward two months in time. He first encounters the recently killed bodies of Brennan and Lacombe. He then witnesses Danielle confronting her lover Robert because she believes that the rest of the team became infected while inside the temple. Each of them has a gun pointed at the other. Robert convinces her that they should lower their weapons, then raises his and pulls the trigger. The gun does not fire, as Danielle had removed the firing pin from it. (Note: As told by Danielle in Solitary.) She shoots him. Danielle also attempts to kill Jin, but another time shift occurs and Jin is reunited with the other survivors: James "Sawyer" Ford (Josh Holloway), John Locke (Terry O'Quinn), Juliet Burke (Elizabeth Mitchell), Miles Straume (Ken Leung), Charlotte Lewis (Rebecca Mader) and Daniel Faraday (Jeremy Davies).

The group is on their way to the Dharma Initiative Orchid Station, where Locke believes he can find a way to leave the island in his attempt to bring the Oceanic Six back to the island. Several time jumps occur and Charlotte becomes so ill that she must stay behind, with Daniel choosing to stay with her. She tells Jin to keep his wife away from the island, saying "This place is death." She tells Locke to look for a well, if the Orchid Station is not there. Later, she confesses to Daniel that she grew up on the island and that before she left, a man told her never to come back or she would die; she believes Daniel is that man. (Note: As depicted in The Variable.) She dies shortly thereafter. The other survivors arrive at the location of the Orchid and find the well. Jin tells Locke to tell Sun that he died and gives Locke his wedding ring as proof because he does not want Sun or their child to return to the island. While descending the well, another flash occurs and Locke falls and injures his leg, resulting in an open fracture. Arriving in the frozen chamber with the wheel that Ben used to move the island, (Note: As depicted in There's No Place Like Home.) Jack's deceased father, Christian Shephard (John Terry), greets Locke and tells him that he meant for Locke to move the island in the first place. Christian tells him to convince everyone who left to come back, and find a woman called Eloise Hawking. Locke then pushes the wheel and leaves the island.

In late 2007, Sun-Hwa Kwon (Yunjin Kim) confronts Benjamin Linus (Michael Emerson) during his meeting with Kate Austen (Evangeline Lilly), Jack Shephard (Matthew Fox) and Sayid Jarrah (Naveen Andrews). She intends to kill him; however, he reveals to her that Jin is still alive on the island. She reluctantly agrees to go with him and Jack to another location, where he can substantiate his claims. They go to a church, where Ben shows her Jin's wedding ring, which Ben took from Locke as proof that Jin is alive. Desmond Hume (Henry Ian Cusick) arrives at the church, in his search for Daniel Faraday's mother. His mother turns out to be Eloise Hawking (Fionnula Flanagan), who Desmond met when time-traveling. (Note: As depicted in Flashes Before Your Eyes.) The four go inside the church, where Eloise is disappointed that Ben did not bring the rest of the Oceanic Six.

== Production ==
Rebecca Mader, who plays Charlotte, found out that her character would die when she was negotiating contracts in June 2008. When Mader originally started on the show in August 2007, she was only supposed to do eight episodes, but due to the writers strike, she ended up doing twenty. Mader said: "I was on the show a lot longer than I thought I was going to be. A lot of it has to do with the writers strike. Less episodes in season four meant back stories were compromised for the new people. I think that's why my character carried into season five." When she found out about her character's death she was "disappointed". "When I got to the end of season four and found out Charlotte had been born on the island, that was huge. So when I found out I was leaving, I was disappointed. Like all things, it's for the best," she said. Mader then reprised her role as Charlotte in the season six episodes "Recon" and "The End."

== Reception ==
The episode gained 11.862 million American viewers and 415,000 Australian viewers.

IGN's Chris Carabott felt Charlotte's death could have been explored further, but as there was so much happening in the episode not enough time was made for her death. Alan Sepinwall of The Star-Ledger noted it was Jeremy Davies' portrayal of Faraday's grief that made him care about her death. Cynthia Littleton from Variety said this was one of the few times Charlotte did not annoy her, as she acts as a translator for Jin, "finally do[ing] something worthwhile".
