= The Life and Death of Jeremy Bentham =

- Lost episode
- Episode no.: Season 5 Episode 7
- Directed by: Jack Bender
- Written by: Damon Lindelof; Carlton Cuse
- Production code: 506
- Original air date: February 25, 2009
- Running time: 46 minutes

Guest appearances
- Malcolm David Kelley as Walt Lloyd; Alan Dale as Charles Widmore; Lance Reddick as Matthew Abaddon; Saïd Taghmaoui as Caesar; Zuleikha Robinson as Ilana; Ammar Daraiseh as Hajer; Grisel Toledo as Nurse Susie Lazenby; Stephen Scibetta as Foreman; John Jamal Bradley as Kid; Concepcion Saucedo as Sister Consuela

Episode chronology
← Previous "316"	Next → "LaFleur"
- Lost season 5

"The Life and Death of Jeremy Bentham" is the seventh television episode of the fifth season of ABC's Lost. The 93rd episode of the show overall, it aired on February 25, 2009, on ABC in the United States, being simulcast on A in Canada. The episode was written by showrunners and executive producers Damon Lindelof and Carlton Cuse and directed by Jack Bender.

John Locke, after stopping the time shifts and being transported to 2007 in the Tunisian Desert, starts his journey as Jeremy Bentham. At the crash site of the Ajira Airways Flight 316, the passengers try to find the identity of an unidentified man.

== Plot ==
The episode begins an unknown amount of time after the crash of Ajira Airways Flight 316, which took off from Los Angeles, (Note: As depicted in 316.) and has crashed on the small island where the Dharma Initiative Hydra Station is located. One of the crash survivors, Caesar (Saïd Taghmaoui), searches through Benjamin Linus's (Michael Emerson) old office in the Hydra Station, finding several documents and a sawed-off shotgun. He is interrupted by Ilana (Zuleikha Robinson), who informs him that a man no one remembers seeing on the plane has been found: John Locke (Terry O'Quinn). Locke explains to Ilana that the last thing he remembers is dying.

The narrative shifts into an extended flashback of Locke's time off the island, after he left it when correcting the wheel's axis. (Note: As depicted in This Place is Death.) In late 2007, Locke is transported to a desert in Tunisia, where he is taken to a local hospital and visited by Charles Widmore (Alan Dale). Widmore tells Locke that he led the Others until Ben took over and tricked him into leaving the island. Widmore pledges to help Locke reunite the Oceanic Six—Jack Shephard (Matthew Fox), Kate Austen (Evangeline Lilly), Sayid Jarrah (Naveen Andrews), Sun-Hwa Kwon (Yunjin Kim), Hugo "Hurley" Reyes (Jorge Garcia) and Claire Littleton's (Emilie de Ravin) son, Aaron—in order to take them back to the island. Widmore gives Locke a fake identity, Jeremy Bentham, and assigns Matthew Abaddon (Lance Reddick) to assist him.

Sayid, Hurley and Kate all refuse to go back to the island after being visited by Locke. Locke also visits Walt Lloyd (Malcolm David Kelley), but decides not to ask him to return to the island because he has been through enough already. Meanwhile, Kate's conversation with Locke leads him to look for his old girlfriend, Helen Norwood (Katey Sagal), who he discovers has died. While visiting her grave, Abaddon is shot and killed; Locke gets into a car accident after he flees the scene in a panic. He awakens in Jack's hospital, where the two once again argue about the island. Before Jack leaves, Locke tells him that his father, Christian Shephard (John Terry), is alive on the island. This greatly upsets Jack, who says that they were never important, and angrily leaves. Locke then goes to a hotel, where he attempts to hang himself. (Note: A month later, according to Jack in There's No Place Like Home.) Just in time, Ben arrives and talks Locke down. Ben admits to shooting Abaddon, claiming it was to protect him. Locke tells Ben that he couldn't convince Hurley, Jack, Kate, Sayid, or Sun to return to the island. However, Ben tells Locke that Jack has booked a ticket to Sydney. Locke realizes he did convince Jack, and Jack wants to crash on the island. (Note: As depicted in Through the Looking Glass.) Ben says that with Jack on their side, he can convince the rest. After learning of Locke's plan to seek advice from Eloise Hawking (Fionnula Flanagan) on how to return to the island, Ben kills Locke, making it look like suicide. He then takes Jin-Soo Kwon's (Daniel Dae Kim) wedding ring, which Jin had entrusted to Locke. The narrative returns to the present on the island, where Locke discovers an unconscious Ben among the injured passengers of Flight 316.

== Production ==
This episode and "316" were written at the same time by executive producers Lindelof and Cuse. "The Life and Death of Jeremy Bentham" was originally meant to be aired first, but the order was switched because they felt it made more sense and was "cooler." While in the "mini-camp" where the writing team decided the plot elements of season five, it was decided to have five episodes continuing the story of most characters, before a "concept episode" telling the story of Locke's journey before dying, as it was "the missing piece" to the story of the Oceanic Six and their return to the island. The script originally requested for Locke to suffer a head-on collision, but stunt coordinator Michael Trisler suggested a change to a crossroads accident between three cars, because a head-on could not be reenacted in a way it would be safe to the stunt driver. Two blue cars like the one Locke drives were used for the stunts.

== Reception ==
The episode attracted 12.078 million American viewers and 359,000 Australian viewers.
