= Jack Bender =

American film and television director

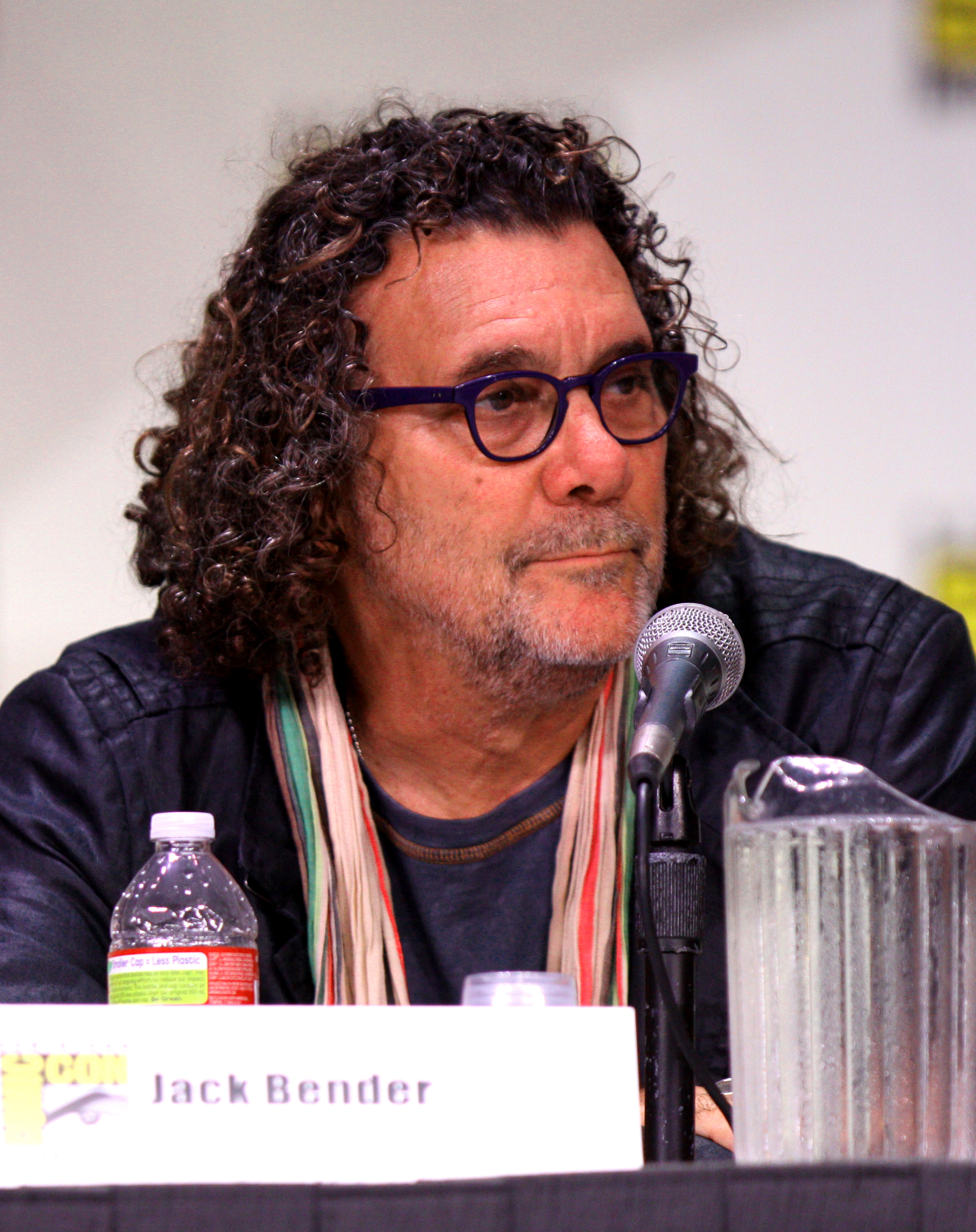
- Bender at the 2013 ComicCon
- Born: Los Angeles, California, U.S.
- Occupations: Television director; television producer; film director; television writer; actor
- Years active: 1971–present
- Spouse: Laura Owens
- Children: 2

Jack Bender is an American television and film director, television producer and actor known for his work as a director on Lost, The Sopranos, Game of Thrones, and From.

== Biography ==
Bender grew up in a secular Jewish family in Los Angeles. His father was a furrier to the Hollywood community. He studied art with Los Angeles artist Martin Lubner (spouse of actress Joanna Merlin) and then went into acting "because it seemed like what I could do and make a living." As an actor, Bender guest-starred on All in the Family, The Bob Newhart Show and The Mary Tyler Moore Show. He co-starred in The Million Dollar Duck, Savage and McNaughton's Daughter. He then went into directing, working on a number of television series.

He directed the popular slasher film Child's Play 3 before becoming an executive producer and lead director on the ABC TV series Lost, directing 38 episodes of the show, including the series finale. Bender has also directed on other popular shows such as The Sopranos, Carnivàle, Alias and Boston Public. In recent years he was an executive producer and lead director on the TV series Under the Dome (2013) and The Last Ship (2014–15). In 2016, Bender directed the fifth and sixth episodes of the sixth season of Game of Thrones, followed by episodes of Mr. Mercedes (2017-2019), a limited TV series adaptation of Stephen King's novel of the same name.

Bender received nominations for the Primetime Emmy Award for Outstanding Directing for a Drama Series for his direction of the Lost episodes "Live Together, Die Alone", "Through the Looking Glass" and the series finale "The End". He was also nominated for the Game of Thrones episode "The Door".

== Family and personal life ==
Bender is married to Rabbi Laura Owens of B’nai Horin of Los Angeles. They have two daughters, Hannah and Sophie Owens-Bender.

== Filmography ==
Short film

- A Real Naked Lady (1981)

Feature film

- Child's Play 3 (1991)
- Lone Justice 2 (1995)
- Tower of Song: A Memorial Tribute to Leonard Cohen (2018) (Concert film)

TV series

- Eight Is Enough (1977)
- The Paper Chase (1978)
- Falcon Crest (1981)
- Fame (1982)
- King's Crossing (1982)
- High School U.S.A. (1984) (failed TV pilot based on the 1983 film)
- Northern Exposure (1990)
- Beverly Hills, 90210 (1990)
  - Episode "The Game Is Chicken"
  - Episode "Home and Away"
  - Episode "Sentenced to Life"
- Ned Blessing: The Story of My Life and Times (1993)
- New York News (1995)
- Profiler (1996)
  - Episode "Cycle Of Violence"
  - Episode "It Cuts Both Ways"
  - Episode "Modus Operandi"
  - Episode "Old Acquaintance"
- Felicity (1998)
  - Episode 2.21 "The Aretha Theory"
  - Episode 2.23 "The Biggest Deal There Is"
  - Episode 3.02 "The Anti-Natalie Intervention"
- The Sopranos (1999)
  - Episode 3.05 "Another Toothpick"
  - Episode 3.10 "...To Save Us All from Satan's Power"
  - Episode 4.04 "The Weight"
  - Episode 6.03 "Mayham"
- Judging Amy (1999)
  - Episode 1.02 "Short Calendar"
  - Episode 1.15 "Culture Clash"
  - Episode 1.17 "Drawing the Line"
  - Episode 2.09 "The Undertow"
  - Episode 2.16 "Everybody Falls Down"
  - Episode 3.02 "Off the Grid"
- That's Life (2000)
- Boston Public (2000)
- Alias (2001)
  - Episode 1.07 "Color-Blind"
  - Episode 1.10 "Spirit"
  - Episode 1.12 "The Box, Part 1"
  - Episode 1.13 "The Box, Part 2"
  - Episode 2.13 "Phase One"
  - Episode 3.03 "Reunion"
  - Episode 3.07 "Prelude"
  - Episode 3.10 "Remnants"
  - Episode 3.15 "Façade"
  - Episode 3.18 "Unveiled"
  - Episode 3.20 "Blood Ties"
- Presidio Med (2002)
  - Episode "Breathless"
- Boomtown (2002) (episode "Blackout")
- Carnivàle (2003)
  - Episode 1.09 "Insomnia"
  - Episode 2.02 "Alamogordo, NM"
- Joan of Arcadia (2003)
- The Lyon's Den (2003)
- Lost (2004–2010)
  - Episode 1.03 "Tabula Rasa"
  - Episode 1.04 "Walkabout"
  - Episode 1.07 "The Moth"
  - Episode 1.12 "Whatever the Case May Be"
  - Episode 1.16 "Outlaws"
  - Episode 1.23 "Exodus: Part 1"
  - Episode 1.24/1.25 "Exodus: Part 2"
  - Episode 2.01 "Man of Science, Man of Faith"
  - Episode 2.03 "Orientation"
  - Episode 2.12 "Fire and Water"
  - Episode 2.15 "Maternity Leave"
  - Episode 2.18 "Dave"
  - Episode 2.23/2.24 "Live Together, Die Alone"
  - Episode 3.01 "A Tale of Two Cities"
  - Episode 3.05 "The Cost of Living"
  - Episode 3.08 "Flashes Before Your Eyes"
  - Episode 3.13 "The Man from Tallahassee"
  - Episode 3.16 "One of Us"
  - Episode 3.22/3.23 "Through the Looking Glass"
  - Episode 4.01 "The Beginning of the End"
  - Episode 4.03 "The Economist"
  - Episode 4.05 "The Constant"
  - Episode 4.09 "The Shape of Things to Come"
  - Episode 4.13/4.14 "There's No Place Like Home, Part 2"
  - Episode 5.02 "The Lie"
  - Episode 5.07 "The Life and Death of Jeremy Bentham"
  - Episode 5.09 "Namaste"
  - Episode 5.13 "Some Like It Hoth"
  - Episode 5.16/5.17 "The Incident"
  - Episode 6.01/6.02 "LA X"
  - Episode 6.05 "Lighthouse"
  - Episode 6.08 "Recon"
  - Episode 6.11 "Happily Ever After"
  - Episode 6.14 "The Candidate"
  - Episode 6.17/6.18 "The End"
- Alcatraz (2012)
  - Episode 1.02 "Ernest Cobb"
  - Episode 1.03 "Kit Nelson"
  - Episode 1.10 "Clarence Montgomery"
  - Episode 1.11 "Webb Porter"
- Rewind (2013) (failed TV pilot)
- Under the Dome (2013)
  - Episode 1.02 "The Fire"
  - Episode 1.05 "Blue on Blue"
  - Episode 1.08 "Thicker Than Water"
  - Episode 1.13 "Curtains"
  - Episode 2.01 "Heads Will Roll"
  - Episode 2.06 "In the Dark"
  - Episode 2.08 "Awakening"
  - Episode 2.11 "Black Ice"
  - Episode 2.13 "Go Now"
- The Last Ship (2014)
  - Episode 1.02 "Welcome to Gitmo"
  - Episode 1.03 "Dead Reckoning"
  - Episode 1.04 "We'll Get There"
  - Episode 1.09 "Trials"
  - Episode 2.01 "Unreal City"
  - Episode 2.02 "Fight the Ship"
  - Episode 2.05 "Achilles"
  - Episode 2.13 "A More Perfect Union"
- Game of Thrones (2016)
  - Episode 6.5 "The Door"
  - Episode 6.6 "Blood of My Blood"
- From (2022)
  - Episode 1.01 "Long Day's Journey Into Night"
  - Episode 1.02 "The Way Things Are Now"
  - Episode 1.03 "Choosing Day"
  - Episode 1.04 "A Rock and a Farway"
  - Episode 2.01 "Strangers in a Strange Land"
  - Episode 2.02 "The Kindness of Strangers"
  - Episode 2.05 "Lullaby"
  - Episode 2.06 "Pas de Deux"
  - Episode 2.09 "Ball of Magic Fire"
  - Episode 2.10 "Once Upon a Time?"
  - Episode 3.01 "Shatter"
  - Episode 3.02 "When We Go"
  - Episode 3.03 "Mouse Trap"
  - Episode 3.04 "There and Back Again"
  - Episode 3.09 "Revelations: Chapter One"
  - Episode 3.10 "Revelations: Chapter Two"
  - Episode 4.01 "The Arrival"
  - Episode 4.02 "Fray"
- Mr. Mercedes (2017-2019) (limited TV series)
- The Institute (2025)
  - Episode 1.01 "The Boy"
  - Episode 1.02 "Shots for Dots"
  - Episode 1.07 "Hide"
  - Episode 1.08 "Fight"

TV movies

- In Love with an Older Woman (1982)
- Two Kinds of Love (1983)
- Shattered Vows (1984)
- Deadly Messages (1985)
- Letting Go (1985)
- The Midnight Hour (1985)
- Side by Side (1988)
- Tricks of the Trade (1988)
- Charlie (1989)
- My Brother's Wife (1989)
- The Dreamer of Oz: The L. Frank Baum Story (1990)
- The Perfect Tribute (1991)
- Love Can Be Murder (1992)
- Armed and Innocent (1994)
- Gambler V: Playing for Keeps (1994)
- Family Album (1994)
- Nothing Lasts Forever (1995)
- A Face to Die For (1996)
- Sweet Dreams (1996)
- Friends 'Til the End (1997)
- Killing Mr. Griffin (1997)
- A Call to Remember (1997)
- The Tempest (1998)
- It Came from the Sky (1999)
- My Little Assassin (1999)
- The David Cassidy Story (2000)
- The Lone Ranger (2003)
