= Melissa Farman =

American actress

- Born: New York City, New York, U.S.
- Occupation: Actress

Melissa Farman is an American actress. She is known for playing a young Danielle Rousseau in Lost (portrayed by Mira Furlan as an adult) and for her role as Bristol Palin in HBO's Game Change.

== Early life ==
After being born in New York City, she moved to Paris and grew up in an English- and French-speaking home. At the age of ten Farman was accepted into the Bilingual Acting Workshop for professional actors in Paris. She studied English and political science at the University of Southern California.

== Career ==
Farman had a role in Cold Case and most notably in Lost as a young Danielle Rousseau. She has played in TV movies as well, including a role in Temple Grandin (an HBO biopic of Temple Grandin), and played Bristol Palin in the HBO Television movie Game Change. She also played Izzy in Call Me Crazy: A Five Film.

In 2014, she starred in the Western drama series Strange Empire on CBC Television.

== Filmography ==
=== Film ===
Year	Title	Role	Notes
2011	The Moth Diaries	Dora	

=== Television ===
Year	Title	Role	Notes
2009	Cold Case	Tammy Buonaforte / Brown	Episode: "Witness Protection"
2009	Lost	Danielle Rousseau	3 episodes
2009	Lost: A Journey in Time	Danielle Rousseau	Television film
2009	Law & Order: Special Victims Unit	Chantelle Shepard	Episode: "Sugar"
2010	Temple Grandin	Alice	Television film
2011	NCIS	Alexis Ross / Jinn	Episode: "Tell-All"
2012	Game Change	Bristol Palin	Television film
2012	CSI: Crime Scene Investigation	Ashley Benson	Episode: "Trends with Benefits"
2012	WWE Raw	Herself	Episode: "Brock And Cena"
2012	WWE SmackDown	Herself	Episode #14.16
2012	WWE Saturday Morning Slam	Herself	Episode: "Guest Stars"
2012	Perception	Joan of Arc	Episode: "Messenger"
2012	The March Sisters at Christmas	Beth March	Television film
2013	Elementary	Carly Purcell	Episode: "Dirty Laundry"
2013	Call Me Crazy: A Five Film	Izzy	Television film
2014–2015	Strange Empire	Dr. Rebecca Blithely	13 episodes
2016	NCIS: New Orleans	Jessica Levy	Episode: "If It Bleeds, It Leads"
2018	Timeless	Irene Curie	Episode: "The War to End All Wars"
2021	Legends of Tomorrow	Noelle	Episode: "Bad Blood"
2022	The Endgame	Natalia	3 episodes
