= James "Sawyer" Ford =

Fictional character of the TV series Lost

- Lost character
- Josh Holloway as Sawyer.
- First appearance: "Pilot (Part 1)"
- Last appearance: "The End"
- Created by: Jeffrey Lieber; J. J. Abrams; Damon Lindelof
- Portrayed by: Josh Holloway
- Centric episode(s): "Confidence Man" "Outlaws" "Exodus, Part 1" "The Long Con" "Every Man for Himself" "LaFleur" "The Incident, Part 1" "LA X, Part 1 & 2" "Recon" "The Last Recruit" "The End"

In-universe information
- Aliases: Sawyer, Jim LaFleur
- Species: Human
- Gender: Male
- Occupation: Con man Head of Security, DHARMA; Police officer (alternative line)
- Significant others: Cassidy Phillips (sex); Ana Lucía Cortez (sex); Kate Austen (former love, sex); Juliet Burke (dead girlfriend); Charlotte Lewis (date and sex; alternative line)
- Children: Clementine Phillips
- Relatives: Warren Ford (Father; deceased); Mary Ford (Mother; deceased); Doug (uncle)
- Nationality: American

James Ford, better known by the alias "Sawyer" (/ˈsɔːjər/) and later as "Jim LaFleur", is a fictional character on the ABC television series Lost, portrayed by Josh Holloway. Created by Jeffrey Lieber, J. J. Abrams and Damon Lindelof, he first appeared in the pilot as one of the survivors of Oceanic Flight 815 which crashed on a mysterious island, and remained one of the show's main characters.

Serving as an anti-hero since his introduction, Sawyer was initially portrayed as a selfish, conniving and sarcastic handsome flirt who hoards stashes of washed-ashore items for himself. Flashbacks detailing his past are used to depict his more sensitive side, juxtaposed against acts of betrayal and theft. For the first four seasons, he competes with Jack Shephard (Matthew Fox) for the affections of Kate Austen (Evangeline Lilly), but the latter's love for Jack ultimately prevails. He develops a more heroic side in season four and sacrifices his chance to get off the Island so his friends can escape. In the fifth season, Sawyer quickly acclimates to his new role as the leader of the remaining survivors. When they are sent back through time, Sawyer falls in love and forms a stable relationship with Juliet Burke (Elizabeth Mitchell), with whom he moves onto the afterlife in the series finale.

== Character biography ==
=== Prior to the crash ===
Sawyer was born in 1968 in Jasper, Alabama as James Ford. When James was eight years old, his parents were conned by John Locke’s father under the alias of "Tom Sawyer"; as a result, his father killed both his mother and himself. On the day of the funeral, Jacob expresses his condolences to Sawyer, even as he is writing his 'I am going to find you' letter for the conman who took his family. At the time of his parents' death, James and his family were living in Knoxville, Tennessee according to the letter Sawyer carries. James also claims to have dropped out of high school in the ninth grade but has a "high school transcript." A major driving force in James' life is his vow to avenge his parents' deaths by hunting down the original Sawyer; as an adult, when he found himself in financial difficulty, he adopted the profession and alias of the man responsible for his parents' death, using his looks and charm to seduce wealthy married women, thus he "became the man he was hunting." One of his scams involved waking up next to his victim and pretending to be late for an important meeting; as he rushes to get ready, his briefcase will "accidentally" spill open, revealing bundles of cash the woman "wasn't supposed to see." With her interest piqued, he convinces her and her spouse to invest cash in a legally questionable, but supposedly lucrative business opportunity, before disappearing with the money. On one occasion, he runs this con up until he discovers the targeted couple has a child, experiences an attack of conscience and cancels the deal.

On another occasion, Sawyer carries out a "Long con" (large-scale con) on a divorced woman named Cassidy who is known to be less gullible than his usual victims. He sets up the usual con and spills his cash over the ground, only this time with fake bank notes. Cassidy realizes he's trying to con her from the moment he spills the money, and tells him his con wouldn't have worked because she received no money after the divorce. Instead of being mad, however, she asks him to teach her his profession. After learning a few basic tricks, Cassidy soon asks Sawyer to pull off a long con. He tells her such a con requires money, and she reveals she actually received $600,000 from her ex-husband. He pretends to begin a long con, using her money to set it up, but in fact he simply plans to take the money. However, she has begun to grow on him, and he wavers on his con. While visiting the diner of Kate's mother, his partner (played by Kevin Dunn) forces Sawyer to resume his con on threat of death. He goes back to Cassidy and tells her that he has been conning her, and warns her of a car parked outside. He stuffs the money into a bag and tells her to leave with it, and he will take the blame. When she runs off, he takes the real money (having given her fake bank notes) and returns to the car, actually empty.

Cassidy presses charges against Sawyer for conning her, and he is sent to prison. Cassidy visits him and informs him they have a daughter, named Clementine. While in prison, Sawyer befriends a man named Munson, sentenced for a white-collar crime. On behalf of the police, he cons Munson into revealing where he hid the money he stole; as a result, Sawyer's sentence is cut short, and the monetary reward he receives is deposited in an anonymous bank account for Clementine at his request. Later, as Sawyer is seducing another woman, another partner (played by Robert Patrick) informs him of the whereabouts of the original Sawyer who conned his parents. Sawyer travels to Australia to confront the man, and shoots him. Before he dies, Sawyer realizes his partner had conned him into killing someone who owed money to an important person. Sawyer also encounters and drinks with Christian Shephard at a bar. While in Australia, Sawyer is arrested, at the same station visited by Boone, for assaulting Warren Truss, an Australian politician and leader of the National Party, during a bar fight. As a result, Sawyer is deported and banned from returning to Australia; he leaves on board Oceanic Flight 815, his seat number being 15D.

=== After the crash ===
==== Season One ====
Upon crashing on the island, Sawyer almost instantly clashes with the other survivors. He initially accuses Sayid of being the terrorist who caused the crash. Despite this, he joins Sayid, along with Kate, Charlie, Boone and Shannon on a hike to send out a distress signal. Upon returning, Sawyer searches the plane wreck for anything and everything he can find and keeps them for himself, causing the other survivors to bargain with him for items. He and Jack clash over the attention of Kate on regular intervals. Kate claims to see through his attempts to make people hate him, until he shows her the letter he wrote but implies it was written to him by one of his victims; later she sees the date on the envelope and realizes he wrote the letter himself. After Jack is caught in a cave-in, Sawyer locates Kate in the jungle and eventually informs her. When Shannon experiences asthma attacks, Sawyer is immediately under suspicion of possessing her inhalers after Boone sees him with one of his belongings. After being interrogated by Sayid, he tells Kate that he doesn't have them, causing an enraged Sayid to stab him in the arm. Kate then confronts Sawyer regarding his selfish actions, and tells him to change his ways by cooperating more with the survivors. He reluctantly agrees.

In the jungle, Sawyer and Kate discover a case, carried on the plane by the marshal, and the two constantly fight over its ownership, until Jack takes it from Sawyer. Soon after, Sawyer becomes constantly harassed by a boar, and seeks Kate's help in finding it. Upon cornering it, however, Sawyer decides to let it go. After learning about Michael's plan to build a raft, Sawyer asks for a place on board, to which he is granted. However, after someone (later revealed as Walt) sets the raft on fire, Sawyer and Michael blame Jin and Sawyer takes him to the beach with the intent of beating him. Once the matter is solved, Sawyer experiences headaches and, after consulting Jack, is prescribed reading glasses, made from pairs found in the wreckage. His voice also calms the newborn of survivor Claire.

The day before the raft sets sail, Sawyer and Kate clash once more, this time over his place on the raft. While Kate placed a good argument, Sawyer revealed her past life as a criminal to the survivors, securing his space on the raft. The next day, Sawyer, Michael, Walt and Jin set sail on the raft. When a piece of the raft breaks off, Sawyer is the first in the water to retrieve and re-attach it. He also begins reading through the survivors' personal messages, kept in a bottle. That night, they encounter a small boat and begin celebrating their rescue. However, they soon reveal themselves as the Others, and demand they hand over Walt. In an attempt to prevent Walt's abduction, Sawyer is shot in the shoulder before the raft is destroyed by the Others, who leave with Walt.

==== Season Two ====
Sawyer and Michael are stranded at sea with the wreckage of the raft. Sawyer removes the bullet from his shoulder prior to arriving back on the island, encountering the tail section survivors from the plane and being thrown into a pit. Once the mishap is cleared, Sawyer, Michael and Jin are released and forced into leading them to the fuselage camp. Throughout the journey, Sawyer constantly clashes with leader Ana Lucia, until he passes out from his bullet wound. He is then carried via hand-made stretcher until the death of Shannon, where he is carried by Mr. Eko into the hatch. He is cared for by Kate, until her father, Wayne, is channeled through Sawyer. Upon recovering, Sawyer reluctantly must seek Jack's medical expertise on a regular basis.

On one such occasion, Sawyer releases Jack and Locke from the armory after Michael locks them in to search for Walt alone. Sawyer agrees to join them as they follow, only to encounter the Others. After revealing to have Kate held hostage, Sawyer, Jack and Locke reluctantly hand over their guns for her safety. Unlike Jack, Sawyer sympathizes with Kate's actions. Soon after, Sawyer sets up a long con, with the help of Charlie, in order to gain possession of the camp's entire firearms and medicine, using Sun as a victim of a faked abduction attempt. Upon succeeding this feat, Sawyer is challenged by Jack to a game of poker with the medicine as the prize, which Jack wins. Sawyer later gives Sun a pregnancy test upon request, and informs Bernard and Jin about her suspected pregnancy.

Sawyer also uses his possession of the medicine to his advantage, and mocks Hurley when he admits to seeing things, only for his tirade to backfire. He also refuses to help Bernard create an S.O.S. sign on the beach. He is soon confronted by Ana Lucia, demanding he give her a gun. She seduces him, and steals his own gun from him. Upon discovering this, Sawyer, along with Jack, Locke and Kate, head for the hatch, where they discover Michael injured, Libby fatally wounded and Ana Lucia already dead. Michael asks Sawyer if he will go with him to the Others' camp, to which he agrees. After the funeral of Ana Lucia and Libby, Sawyer joins Michael, Jack, Kate and Hurley on the trek, where they are suddenly ambushed by the Others, tied up and taken to a pier. While Michael (along with Walt) leave the island, and Hurley is released, Sawyer is taken away by the Others, along with Jack and Kate.

==== Season Three ====
Sawyer wakes in the Others' camp, imprisoned in a cage originally designed to hold polar bears. Karl, a teenager being held in the cage across from Sawyer's, helps Sawyer to figure out the mechanism in his cage so he can gain access to food and water. Karl then helps him to escape, but Juliet shoots Sawyer in the neck with a tranquilizer dart and he is returned to his cage. Karl is taken away, and Kate is placed in the cage vacated by Karl. Sawyer and Kate are forced to mine and haul rocks for the Others. During this manual labor, Sawyer kisses Kate, even though he gets beaten for it by Danny Pickett. Pickett, one of the Others, dislikes Sawyer, blaming him for the death of his wife.

Sawyer and Kate concoct an escape plan, but they are prevented from acting on it when Sawyer is knocked unconscious by Ben. The Others operate on Sawyer, implanting a pacemaker which will malfunction and kill him if his heart rate exceeds 140 beats per minute. He is told if he does not cooperate, Kate will be given a pacemaker too. Because of this, Sawyer does not defend himself when Pickett violently beats him up.

Kate realizes she can slip out between top bars of her cage, but Sawyer refuses to escape with her. Instead of fleeing on her own, she returns to her cage. Later, Ben reveals to Sawyer that he has been conned, and there is no pacemaker in his heart. Ben informs Sawyer they are on a smaller island, separated by a stretch of open ocean from the island on which their plane crashed. Sawyer realizes how inescapable the island is, and is returned to his cage.

Kate opens Sawyer's cell but Sawyer again refused to leave, knowing how futile it would be to try. They have sex, and while Ben is unconscious, having a tumor removed by Jack, Pickett takes the opportunity to finally kill Sawyer. However, Jack threatens to let Ben die unless Kate and Sawyer are released. Sawyer turns the tables on Pickett, beats him up, and he and Kate escape. Alex Rousseau helps them hide in the jungle in return for freeing Karl (her boyfriend), and gives them a canoe to escape in. Right before they leave the beach, Pickett finally catches up with them, but is shot dead by Juliet, who Ben ordered to help them escape.

Back on the main island, Sawyer and Kate argue over his decision to leave Jack behind (and also to let Karl go free). At the survivors' camp, Sawyer keeps his distance from Kate and helps Hurley, Jin, and Charlie in repairing an abandoned Dharma truck Hurley found in the jungle. Back at the camp, he discovers Kate has gone off with Sayid and Locke in order to rescue Jack. He and Hurley develop a friendship, often playing table tennis together. Hurley surprises Sawyer by announcing with Jack, Locke, Kate, and Sayid gone, the rest of the survivors are looking to Sawyer to lead them. Sawyer rises to the challenge and bonds with the other survivors. When Kate and Jack finally return, Sawyer is outraged they have brought Juliet along. He and Sayid attempt to get information on the Others out of her, but they ultimately fail.

Sawyer resumes his relationship with Kate but suspects she is using him to make Jack jealous. One night Locke tells Sawyer that he has captured Ben, and takes Sawyer to the Black Rock, locking him in a room with a bound and gagged stranger. This man, not Ben, reveals he is Anthony Cooper (Locke's father), a conman who reveals he went by name "Tom Sawyer." Sawyer realizes this is the man whom he has been searching for. After Cooper mocks his letter of vengeance, Sawyer strangles him to death in a fit of anger. With no more use for the nickname "Sawyer," he begins to call himself James again, though others continue to refer to him as Sawyer. Locke presents him with a tape showing Juliet is still working for Ben, and the Others are preparing a raid on the survivors. When Sawyer shows the tape to Jack at their camp, Jack reveals he knows about the raid, and Juliet has been working with him to double-cross the Others.

Sawyer and several survivors hike across the jungle to the radio tower. Sayid, Jin, and Bernard stay behind to thwart the Others, and end up captured. Sawyer decides to go back with Juliet to rescue them. With the help of Hurley and the Dharma truck, their rescue is a complete success. Two of the Others are killed and the third, Tom, is captured before Sawyer shoots him out of vengeance for 'taking the kid off the raft.'

==== Season Four ====
When Desmond breaks the news about Charlie's death, Sawyer attempts to comfort Hurley, though his efforts are rejected. Although originally unsure of the meaning of Charlie's dying message, "Not Penny's Boat," when the survivors split Sawyer chooses to go with Locke to the Barracks, telling Kate he was simply doing what he's always done: surviving. While holding Kate hostage in Ben's house on Locke's orders, Sawyer tells Kate he doesn't wish to return to the real world, seeing as he has nothing for him back there. He then proceeds to tell Kate she should do the same, and that they could try to start a life on the island. Kate leaves after Sawyer is relieved that she isn't pregnant, reasoning that they wouldn't be able to handle a baby. They have an argument and part on bad terms as Kate returns to the beach. Later on, a group of people from the boat arrive at the barracks to capture Ben. Ben, Locke, Hurley and Aaron take refuge in Ben's house and they barricade the door. Sawyer runs to retrieve Claire who is still sleeping alone in her house and watches in horror as it is blown up by the Freighters. He finds Claire alive under the ruins and proceeds to run back to Ben's house. After Alex is murdered by Keamy and Ben unleashes the smoke monster on the attackers, Sawyer decides to go back to Jack and the others on the beach. Claire, Aaron and Miles go with him. Hurley was going to go with Sawyer as well, but Locke, pointing a gun at Sawyer, forces Hugo to stay with him. After Sawyer warns Locke not to hurt "a single hair on his [Hugo's] curly head," he leads the rest of the group back to the beach.

Sawyer, Claire and Miles soon come across the bodies of Danielle and Karl. After leaving the area, they decide to settle down to make camp, however during the night Claire takes off into the jungle. Sawyer wakes up the following morning and Miles tells him Claire walked into the jungle in the middle of the night with someone she called "Dad". A short while later he hears Aaron crying and runs off to find him alone in the jungle. Sawyer and Miles, along with Aaron, continue on where they meet Jack and Kate in a small field. Jack and Kate were in the process of moving towards the helicopter from the freighter, with Jack inadvertently thinking the dropped satellite phone from Frank was a message to follow the crew. Sawyer then informs Jack and Kate that Claire walked off and the freighter's crew are up to no good. He hands Aaron over to Kate and tells her to go back to the beach with Miles and the infant, while he insists on going with Jack to face Charles Widmore's men. The two then find the helicopter, discover Frank handcuffed to the seats, and are told the men are heading towards Ben. Sawyer then tells Jack that Hurley is with Ben and the two head off to rescue Hurley.

Jack and Sawyer eventually find Hurley and Locke at the Dharma Orchid station. After Jack finishes talking with Locke, Sawyer and Hurley meet up with Kate, Sayid, and Frank at the helicopter. En route to the freighter Frank notices that the helicopter is quickly losing fuel due to a bullet hole in the gas tank. The passengers ditch all unnecessary items to lighten the load, but Frank declares it will not be enough. Sawyer whispers something to Kate, he gives her a goodbye kiss, and he then bails out of the helicopter to give the others a chance of escape. Sawyer swims back to the Island and encounters Juliet, who directs his attention to smoke coming from the ruins of the freighter. As the two lie on the beach drinking rum they disappear with the vanished Island.

=== After the Island ===
After the Oceanic Six (Jack, Kate, Hurley, Sun, Sayid and Aaron) leave the Island, flashforwards in "Something Nice Back Home" reveal Kate is doing undisclosed favors for Sawyer, who, according to Jack, "chose to stay on the island".

=== Season Five ===
==== After the flash ====
James and Juliet meet up with Charlotte, Miles, Rose, Bernard and the other 815 survivors and they discover their camp is somehow missing. James is then introduced to Daniel Faraday, who tells him the camps are not gone but that it hasn't been built yet and whatever Ben did in the Orchid station has made them constantly shift through time. They are in the past. The group set out to find a man-made landmark on the Island to determine where they are in time. After several more flashes, the team decide to head back to the beach. At the beach, they are attacked by a barrage of flaming arrows, resulting in several casualties. The group ultimately splits up, with James and Juliet heading toward the creek together. There they are attacked by three strangers. They demand answers, and even threatens to cut off Juliet's hand to emphasize their impatience, when Locke arrives to kill one and injure the other two. James, Juliet, and Locke question the two attackers and Juliet discover they are Others when they speak Latin to each other. They arrive at a camp where Richard Alpert is leading his people and he has Charlotte, Daniel and Miles held captive. The year is 1954. When an Other called Ellie takes Daniel at gunpoint to try to disarm a hydrogen bomb called Jughead, James holds a gun at her in order to rescue him. He then discovers Daniel had told Ellie they are from the future and are not part of the American military which the Others had believed they were. Suddenly, there is yet another flash and the Others including Ellie and Richard disappear. James and the rest see Charlotte bleed from her nose and collapse.

James watches as Juliet and Daniel attempt to wake up Charlotte, who eventually comes around. James and Locke decide to head to the Orchid Station, believing a way to stop the jumps is there. When they return to the beach they discover the camp is back but has been abandoned and they also find a rowing boat on which they decide to use to get to the Orchid. However, whilst rowing they are attacked by unknown assailants from behind – Juliet manages to shoot one of the attackers but before anything else can happen there is another flash. The assailants are gone, and they are rowing in the rain. Later on, the team is reunited with Jin, last seen in the season four finale, who is alive. Along with Jin the team then continue on to Orchid where the flashes become worse and becomes painful for all the castaways, and not just Charlotte. They arrive, but a flash moves the island to a point before the Orchid was built. With the guidance of Charlotte, who collapsed earlier due to a deteriorating mental state and stay behind with Daniel, they find a well which leads to the Frozen Donkey Wheel. As Locke lowers himself into the well, another flash engulfs the Island. This causes all parts of the well, except the rope James grabbed on, to disappear. In a frenzy, James starts digging at the ground where the rope is, but Juliet stops James, and tells him Locke is gone.

==== 1974 ====
Locke then goes into a cave and turns the crank, which Ben originally turned, and the island stops moving through time. James, Juliet, Miles and Jin head back to Daniel, who informs them Charlotte has died due to violent shifts through time. As they all head back to the beach they hear the sound of gunshots and a woman screaming. Approaching the source of the commotion they see two men holding a woman hostage with a bag over her head after just killing her male companion. James and Juliet aim their guns at the men and tell them to stand down but when one of the men takes a shot at James both he and Juliet kill the men in self-defense. James releases the woman, who introduces herself as Amy. She tells them they need to bury the men they killed and to take her husband's body back to her people in order to keep a truce. As the team and the woman called Amy trudge back, they approach a sonic fence. Amy appears to turn off the machine and walk through it without being harmed. However, James, Juliet, Daniel, Miles and Jin walk through and are all knocked unconscious. Amy is revealed to be wearing earplugs.

James later wakes up in a house on a couch. A man named Horace Goodspeed (Doug Hutchison) demands to know who he and his friends are. Having previously experience with lying, he tells Horace his name is Jim LaFleur and he was a captain of a ship which had crashed on the island while on its way to Tahiti. Horace, believing his story, tells him a submarine is departing from the Island the next day and that James and his friends must be on it. James asks if he could search for his "other friends," but his plea is denied. It appears Horace and Amy are part of the DHARMA Initiative. Later that night, Richard Alpert enters the Barracks, DHARMA's homes, to demand where his two men, the ones James and Juliet killed, are buried. James decides to take control of the situation and he walks up to Richard alone. He explains to Richard he is not from DHARMA and he is friends with John Locke, who had met Richard a few years prior during an earlier flash. He gives the flustered Richard information able to fully convince the latter. James also tells Richard that he was forced to kill his men in self-defense; Richard however tells him his people are livid and want some justice; Amy agrees to give Richard the body of Paul, her husband, in order to keep the truce. The agreement is made; Richard leaves. It appears the present time is 1974, at the peak of the DHARMA Initiative's presence on the Island. Both DHARMA and the Others are in a truce, stating they must respect their own privacy on the Island. A relieved and obliged Horace kindly informs James he and his fellow survivors can stay on the Island for two more weeks in order to search for his friends (Locke), before boarding the next submarine off the Island. James and Juliet share a quiet moment at the dock, the latter telling the former her longing to leave the Island is at its peak. She wants to leave on the next submarine, but James reminds her she has nothing to go back to, since they are thirty years back. Juliet consents to staying.

==== 1977 ====
Three years pass, and James is still on the Island along with his friends. They are all working for DHARMA, and for the most part they are contented living at the Barracks, especially James, who shares a home with Juliet. He is the head of security and an apparently trustworthy figure, using his alias "Jim LaFleur." One morning, he receives a call from Jin regarding the return of Jack, Kate, and Hurley, having returned to the Island and to the past. Stunned, he goes out to meet them at a grassy field far from the Barracks, and there he tells them of his position within DHARMA and the present time of 1977. Kate's return makes him realize that despite being apart for 3 years and having fallen for Juliet, he is still has feelings for Kate, and becomes torn between her and Juliet. In order to smuggle them into DHARMA, Sawyer instructs the three to dress up in appropriate clothing and pretend to be new recruits for DHARMA so as to avoid awkward questions and the Hostiles, DHARMA's name of choice for the Others. Later Sayid, (last seen in 316), who also traveled back in time, is caught in the jungle and is mistaken by DHARMA as a Hostile. James is pressured to execute him for violating the code of truce between DHARMA and the Hostiles, but he has him locked in a cell and quietly contemplates a plan to free him.

Sayid escapes a few days later with the help of eleven-year-old Ben. After the former shoots the latter and runs off, Jin carries the boy back to the Barracks, where he is treated with minimal success at the infirmary. James alerts Jack and pleads him to help, but his request is snubbed. Eventually, James and Kate take the unconscious boy to the Others, believing they can provide the only cure. After doing so, with the caveat Ben will never be the same again, James asks Miles through the surveillance camera at the border between DHARMA's area and the Others' territory to remove the tape containing footage of Ben being taken away. The two return to the Barracks afterward. James is alerted of Roger Linus's, Ben's father, suspicions, and begins to worry about what may come next. Security staff member Phil (Patrick Fischler) confronts James and shows him the tape mentioned earlier, this proving Miles failed James' order. James knocks him out in response and keeps him tied up and gagged in the closet. The next day, he holds a meeting with only the Oceanic Six survivors and Juliet and reluctantly tells them his comfortable life within DHARMA is ending, thanks to Jack, Kate, and Hurley. He wants to return to the beach and start over. However, following the events in The Variable, Radzinsky, an antagonistic engineer of DHARMA's, discovers Phil in the closet and ties up James and Juliet in two chairs, furiously demanding answers. James refuses to comply, forcing Radzinsky to violently beat him, even with Horace pleading him not to. When Dr. Pierre Chang (Francois Chau) disrupts the interrogation to order everyone to leave the Island because of impending danger, James requests the women and children get on the submarine and leave. He also agrees to tell everyone everything on the condition he and Juliet also get spots on the sub. An agreement is made; they get on board, James hoping never to turn back. Unfortunately, Kate also gets on, informing him and Juliet of Jack's intentions to detonate a hydrogen bomb which will decimate the Island and alter the past so Oceanic 815 will never crash twenty-seven years from now. Very reluctantly, James agrees to help stop Jack, and the three secretly leave the sub and head back to the beach. After briefly meeting up with Rose and Bernard (last seen in The Lie) and leaving them, they confront Jack, Hurley, Sayid, Jin, and Miles. James drags Jack to a secluded area and tells him that he, James, could have stopped Anthony Cooper from conning his parents and thus preventing their deaths a year ago, but asserts what is done is done, and Jack should do the same in his case. When Jack rebuffs, they get into a fistfight which continued until Juliet intervenes. Much to James' vexation, Juliet agrees with Jack. Juliet tells James she will never lose him if she does not know him.

As Jack prepares to go to the constructing Swan Station to drop the bomb on the electromagnetic source, Phil and his men spot him and try to shoot him down. James, Juliet, Kate, and Miles come to Jack's aid, and an intense gunfight ensues. DHARMA's men are besieged, and James urges Jack to go ahead and discharge the bomb. However, the bomb does not go off, and the electromagnetic source is activated, causing pandemonium. Phil nearly kills James, but is stabbed dead by a rebar in the process. Amidst the chaos, James spots Juliet falling in the chasm and in danger of getting sucked in. He and Kate grasp her hands and he tells her not to leave him, but the force becomes too strong, causing pain for all of them. Juliet tells James she loves him and releases her clutch, dropping down to the bottom where she cannot be seen. James sobs hysterically, not registering himself, even when Kate and Jack drag him back up.

=== Season 6 ===
==== 2007 ====
In the premiere of season 6, James wakes up in the middle of the jungle and finds out he and the rest of the group traveled back to 2007. They discover the Swan imploded, just like they left it in 2004. James realizes the plan didn't work and Juliet died for no reason, and he beats Jack. They all fall into the hole where the hatch door was supposed to be, and Kate suddenly hears moaning coming from underneath the steel, which leads her to believe Juliet may still be alive. After removing all the pieces of metal, James climbs down and finds a heavily bleeding Juliet. She asks him to kiss her, and after doing so, Juliet dies in his arms. James buries her with Miles' help, but really wants him to implement his medium skills to find out what Juliet's dying words were supposed to be. Miles says Juliet told him "it worked," to which James pouts. Later, he and Miles are captured by the Others, but not before taking down several of them as Miles proclaimed. They are taken to the Temple, the Others' vicinity and only safe location from the Smoke Monster. In his anger over Juliet's death, he tells the Others to do whatever they want with his friends, whom he proclaims are no longer his friends to this point, and leaves. Kate goes after him, following him back to the Barracks and what used to be his and Juliet's house. When James and Kate sit on the docks, he confesses he planned on asking Juliet to marry him, having a ring and all. He admits to Kate he should have let Juliet leave with the sub when she asked him to, back in 1974, but made her stay because he didn't want to be alone. He also tells Kate he doesn't blame her for Juliet's death. He throws the ring in the ocean and then leaves, telling Kate that he will not help her on her mission to find Claire.

He spends his time playing loud music from his record player and drinking. When the Smoke Monster shows up, in the form of Locke, James is not entirely surprised about it, but suspects he is not Locke, judging by the way he talks. The Man in Black persuades him to follow him to a part of the Island to answer the most important question of all: "Why is (James) on the Island?" They then head off; James spots a boy in the jungle and the Man in Black is perturbed to know he can see him too. While the Man in Black runs after the mysterious boy, James meets Richard, who frantically asks him to come along to the Temple. James refuses, and Richard, hearing the Man in Black coming back, runs off. They climb down a cliff to a cave. James sees a scale with a black stone and a white stone, the Man in Black throwing into the sea the latter. The Man in Black then shows James mysterious carvings on the cave ceiling; among them are the surnames of John, Hurley, James (himself), Sayid, Jack, and Sun. The Numbers 4, 8, 15, 16, 23, and 42 correspond to a surname, for Locke, Reyes, Ford, Jarrah, Shephard and Kwon, respectively. James is informed Jacob picked and manipulated those people at various points in their lives to have them show up on the Island. James is a candidate to take up the mantle of leader of the Island; thus, he is given three choices: do nothing, become leader of the Island, or leave the Island with the Man in Black. James firmly chooses the third choice.

He follows the Man in Black to Claire's camp, Claire being a follower of the former. James agrees with Jin he will help look for Sun. The Man in Black then sends him to the other Island, dubbed "Hydra Island" to look for survivors of the Ajira Airways Flight 316. Arriving there, James greets Zoey (Sheila Kelley), who tells him she is the remaining survivor. However, James learns she is lying and demands answers, until a cavalcade of armed men appear and escort him to their leader, Charles Widmore (Alan Dale), who has returned on a submarine. James makes a deal with Widmore: he will lead the Man in Black into a trap in exchange for safe passage away from the island. He travels back to the main island and tells the Man in Black about the deal he made, stating he is loyal to the Man in Black. However, he later reveals his true plan to Kate: to turn both sides against each other and escape on the submarine while both sides are distracted.

When the Man in Black leaves to recruit Sun, James tries to stop Jin from leaving camp, until a barrage of tranquilizers bring them down. Jin is taken away by Widmore's team, who has been spying on them, and James tries to remain calm as the situation reaches higher levels of strain.

In the series finale, James escapes the island on an airplane piloted by Frank Lapidus, along with Kate Austen, Claire Littleton, Richard Alpert and Miles Straume.

=== Afterlife ===
After James' untold death at a later date, he appears in the alternate timeline in 2004. James is on the plane along with the rest of the passengers and has a conversation with Hurley. He somewhat flirts with Kate, a fugitive again, escorted by Edward Mars. Later on, after the plane lands, James and Kate share an elevator at the airport, him noticing the handcuffs around her wrists and realizing her criminal status. When security guards enter the elevator, James helps Kate escape them, knowing she's on the run.

As it turns out, James is actually a policeman from the LAPD. His partner is Miles. However, his back story involving his parents' death at the hands of Anthony Cooper remains unchanged (as shown in his blind date with Charlotte Lewis), and he is adamant on hunting Cooper down and killing him. He had traveled to Australia to look for him, under the pretense he went to Palm Springs, as he had told Miles. However, Miles finds out the truth and threatens to sever their partnership unless James tells him about the trip to Australia. Later, in his car James tells Miles everything, including his yearn to kill Cooper. Miles objects, but before James can respond, a car crashes into his and its driver runs off. The two cops pursue, and James apprehends the driver, Kate.

Along with Kate, James and Miles arrest Sayid, their only suspect in the killing of Martin Keamy and his men. Sun was shot during the battle and was included in the report. After Desmond runs over Locke with his car and attacks Ben, he turns himself in to James. The three (Sayid, Kate and Desmond) are then told they are being transported to County Prison. Before the concert begins in the final episode, The End, Miles sees Sayid in the passenger seat of Hurley's car. He notifies James, who then believes Sayid is after Sun, at the hospital. When James arrives, Sun and Jin are preparing to leave. He notifies them of the possibility of Sun being Sayid's target but they both re-assure him she is safe. Before they leave the hospital room, Jin tells James, "We'll see you there", which leaves him confused. He leaves the room shortly after and bumps into Jack asking him if he knows where to get some food around here. Jack tells him the cafeteria is closed but there are vending machines at the end of the corridor to which he responds, "thanks Doc". A connection was seen between the two but nothing played out. The candy he chooses gets stuck so he tries to reach it using the tray at the bottom. Juliet arrives at the same moment and gives her advice to unplug the machine and the candy will fall. While unplugging the machine, there is a short and the entire room's electricity goes off. Juliet then tells him it worked and while handing him the candy, they both flash. They begin to recall the last few words they said to each other about getting coffee, and they touch again, which allows them to remember what occurred. They embrace, hug, and kiss and are later seen at the church with the other main characters. James and Juliet move on to the next phase of the afterlife together, as soulmates.

== Personality ==
Sawyer is not initially liked by the other survivors due to his antagonistic personality, his habit of hording supplies, and the offensive nicknames he gives some of the other survivors. Early on, he uses his stash of supplies and luxuries like Whiskey and pornography to manipulate others into doing favors for him, but this behavior only highlights a self-destructive personality. In one instance, Sawyer uses his reputation as a hoarder to get Kate to kiss him in exchange for life-saving asthma medication, going so far as to endure torture beforehand, only to reveal that he never had the medication in the first place. Sawyer has trouble working with others, which becomes an issue as he is forced to work with the other survivors or die alone, though he is quoted at one point saying "every man for himself" in season three when he is expected to help Jack escape from The Others. However, he becomes more mature and caring as the show progresses, in part due to his love for Kate, and, later, his own leadership role on the island and his relationship with Juliet. Early flashbacks contrast Sawyer's emotional capacity in his life before the island with his emotional unavailability while on the island. He is also often depicted reading books to pass the time. Some of these books may provide clues or parallels to the show, as when the audience sees him reading the science fiction novel The Invention of Morel, by Adolfo Bioy Casares

== Development ==
Sawyer was originally a slick conman who wore a Prada suit. Midway through his audition for the role, Josh Holloway forgot his lines and kicked a chair in frustration. He managed to remember his lines after this and finished reading the monologue. The producers knew he didn't suit the role, but thought he was very watchable, so they rewrote the role to suit him, making him more feral, Southern, and kept the same intelligence he originally had. Matthew Fox, Jorge Garcia and Dominic Monaghan read Sawyer's lines when they came in to audition because there was no existing script for their characters. Damon Lindelof has stated that Sawyer was written as a character whom audiences were supposed to care about even if his behavior was not sympathetic – "He's an asshole, but he acts as an asshole because of the horrible things that happened to him as a kid". The character flashbacks would try to follow the same spirit of the character, "a humorously engaging rascal — but who did have this sort of darkness to him", while showing what made Sawyer "a man who's hell-bent on revenge, like an Ahab model."
