= Kate Austen =

Fictional character of the TV series Lost

- Lost character
- Evangeline Lilly as Kate Austen in 2008.
- First appearance: "Pilot (Part 1)"
- Last appearance: "The End"
- Created by: Jeffrey Lieber; J. J. Abrams; Damon Lindelof
- Portrayed by: Evangeline Lilly (Original); Emily Evan Rae (Age 11)
- Voiced by: Skye McCole Bartusiak (Young)
- Centric episode(s): Individual: "Tabula Rasa" "Whatever The Case May Be" "Born to Run" "What Kate Did" "I Do" "Left Behind" "Eggtown" "The Little Prince" "Whatever Happened, Happened" "What Kate Does"; Shared: "Pilot, Part 2" "Exodus, Part 1" "There's No Place Like Home (Parts 1 & 3)" "The Incident, Part 1" "LA X, Part 1 & 2" "The End"

In-universe information
- Full name: Katherine Anne Austen
- Aliases: Annie, Joan Hart, Monica Callis, Katherine Dodd, Monica Ryan, Lucy
- Species: Human
- Gender: Female
- Occupation: Fugitive and fake mother of Aaron Littleton
- Nationality: American
- Former residence: Ames, Iowa, USA

Katherine Anne Austen is a fictional character on the ABC television series Lost, played by Canadian actress Evangeline Lilly.

== Character biography ==
=== Prior to the crash ===
Born in 1977 and raised in Iowa, Kate is the daughter of diner worker Diane (Beth Broderick), and Sam (Lindsey Ginter), a U.S. Army Ranger and Gulf War Veteran. At an early age Kate's parents divorced, and Diane married an abusive alcoholic named Wayne Janssen (James Horan). As an adult, Kate killed Wayne, which she confessed to her mother before disappearing. Wayne had always been abusive to her mother, but Kate decided to kill him upon learning that he was her biological father. Diane called the authorities; thereafter Kate was pursued and ultimately arrested by Edward Mars (Fredric Lehne).

Kate fled to Miami under the alias "Monica", where she dated and soon married a police officer named Kevin Callis (Nathan Fillion). After a pregnancy scare and Kevin's purchase of two Oceanic tickets to Costa Rica for their honeymoon, Kate confessed her fugitive past and laced his drink with a sedative before disappearing. After months of traveling around the country under numerous aliases, Kate learned that Diane was dying of cancer, and decided to visit her. She reunited with her high-school sweetheart, Dr. Tom Brennan (Mackenzie Astin), who arranged a meeting between Kate and Diane. As Kate tried to apologize to her, Diane started screaming for help, prompting Kate to flee the hospital with Tom. A policeman opened fire on their getaway car, killing Tom and forcing Kate to flee the scene of the accident.

Months later Kate staged a robbery in New Mexico with several criminals to infiltrate a bank's safe deposit box. Tom's toy airplane was being stored in box 815, the same number as the crashed flight number. She fled to Australia where, while sleeping in a barn, she was discovered by a farmer, Ray Mullens (Nick Tate). Posing as a Canadian hiker, Kate worked on the farm for three months. When the farmer caught her attempting to sneak away, he offered her a ride into town the next morning. During the journey however, Kate discovered that the farmer had found out her true identity and notified Edward Mars of her whereabouts. Kate grabbed the wheel and crashed the truck into a field but instead of running, she helped the unconscious farmer from his vehicle, giving Mars time to pursue and arrest her. Escorting her to the airport in handcuffs, Mars briefed local security officers on Kate's fugitive past and revealed his locked carry-on case containing four firearms (and a fifth in an ankle holster). As the plane was bombarded with escalating turbulence, Mars was knocked unconscious by luggage from the overhead compartment. Kate stole the keys to the handcuffs and attached an oxygen mask to Mars and for herself, as the plane splintered and crashed onto the island.

=== After the crash ===
==== Season 1 ====
Having survived the crash, Jack Shephard noticed Kate walking out of the jungle and asked her to stitch his wound, to which she agreed reluctantly. During their second day on the Island, Jack, Kate, and Charlie Pace (Dominic Monaghan) went to retrieve the cockpit's transceiver from the plane debris. They tried to rescue the injured pilot, but the Smoke Monster attacked them. When they returned, Kate, Sayid Jarrah (Naveen Andrews), and several other survivors hiked to higher ground of the Island to transmit a distress signal on the transceiver.

Back at the camp, Kate visited the injured marshal, who attempted to strangle her. Kate told Jack that he should euthanize the dying man, but Jack questioned her true motives when he learned about her criminal record. She went on a mission to triangulate the distress signal, and helped an injured Michael Dawson back to the camp. Jack suggested that the survivors move to the caves that he had discovered, but Kate refused because she was afraid of "digging in" and settling down.

When Kate discovered the marshal's case, she and Sawyer had several fights to possess it. Eventually Kate asked Jack for his help; he retrieved the case and decided that he should open it with Kate. Inside the case was Tom's toy plane. Jack questioned her about the toy, and she admitted the plane belonged to a man that she loved who was killed.

Kate, along with Jack, attempted to track down Claire and Charlie when they were kidnapped by Ethan. They were able to find and revive a hanging Charlie. Later she helped to capture Ethan. Kate was forced to deliver Claire's baby by herself while Jack was trying to save Boone's life.

Kate tried to gain a place on Michael's raft by stealing Sawyer's and Jin's places. She convinced Jin's wife, Sun, to poison his water to ensure that he would not be able to travel on the raft. In preparation for the trip, Kate stole a dead woman's passport to assume her identity. However, Michael accused Sawyer of Michael's poisoning, which led to Sawyer revealing her fugitive status to the other survivors.

After Rousseau arrived on the beach to warn the camp of the Others' imminent arrival, she directed Kate, Jack, Locke, and Hurley to the Black Rock, where they attempted to carry dynamite to the hatch that was discovered in the jungle.

==== Season 2 ====
Kate and Locke descend into the hatch, Kate entering first. Once inside, she is locked up by Desmond. Kate arrives in a room with a computer, where she overpowers Desmond after Jack arrives. She accidentally damages the computer in the crossfire, causing Desmond to panic and flee. Kate is placed on a rotation to enter a certain set of numbers every 108 minutes into the computer, supposedly saving the world.

While picking fruit Kate sees a black horse from her past. When she returns to the hatch she hallucinates that Wayne is channeled through unconscious injured Sawyer and Kate freaks out. Jack finds her alone in the jungle and tries to comfort her. Kate kisses Jack on impulse, then runs away once she realizes what she's done. She eventually returns to the Hatch to tend Sawyer. They venture outside and both witness the black horse lingering nearby. When Michael runs off in search of his son, Kate follows him, but is kidnapped. After Jack refuses Tom's demands to hand over the guns, Kate is brought out and held at gunpoint to force the men to give up their guns.

When Claire's baby falls ill, Kate joins her on a trek into the jungle to seek Rousseau's help. The three head inland, where they discover the Staff station. Later, Kate and Jack discover a mysterious and unnoticed food drop in the jungle. They return to the hatch, where hostage "Henry Gale" is exposed as an impostor. Later, Kate joins Jack on a trek back to where they encountered the Others. The two make camp and Kate apologizes for kissing him in the jungle. Jack tells her that he is not sorry that she kissed him and they are about to kiss again when an exhausted Michael stumbles out of the bushes. Michael invites her to follow him to the Others' camp when he recovers. The next day, Kate, Jack, Sawyer, and Hurley join Michael Dawson as they head for the Others' camp. They are ambushed, gagged, tied up, and taken to a pier.

==== Season 3 ====
Kate is placed in a cage opposite Sawyer to work for the Others, under the eye of Pickett. Sawyer discovers they are actually on another island, and tries to keep the information from Kate so as to give her hope. When Jack contacts her via Pickett's radio, informing her that she has a head-start to escape, she and Sawyer run towards the beach. They encounter Alex, who gives them her boat

When arriving on the beach, she scolds Sayid and Locke for not bothering to rescue Jack. They head into the jungle and find Rousseau, who agrees to help them after learning of Alex's status. The four trek into the jungle, where they discover the Flame station. There they confront the Other Mikhail and take him hostage. The four resume their hike, eventually arriving at the Others' barracks, and see Jack socializing with the Others. That evening, Kate approaches Jack, but the Others capture Sayid and her. When they are alone, Jack explains to Kate that he has made a deal with The Others. In exchange for saving Ben's life, Jack will be allowed to return home. He promises Kate that he will come back for her and the rest of their friends. But Locke blows up the Other's submarine before Jack can leave. The following day, Kate is gassed by the Others and wakes up in the jungle, handcuffed to Juliet. They eventually return to the beach with Jack and Sayid.

Upon returning, Kate is still wary of Juliet, and becomes especially jealous of Juliet's developing relationship with Jack. Later, she learns of Naomi's arrival. Kate is then shown Jack and Juliet's plan to deal with the Others' imminent attack while the majority travels to the radio tower. En route, Sawyer tells Kate that he's turning back to help the survivors on the beach. Kate wants to go with him, but Sawyer won't let her, and Jack defends Sawyer's actions, knowing that Sawyer is trying to protect Kate. When Kate asks why he is sticking up for Sawyer because she knows Sawyer would never stick up for Jack, Jack replies that it's because he (Jack) loves her. They eventually encounter Ben and Alex in the jungle, at which point Ben is taken hostage.

==== Season 4 ====
Kate follows a trail of Naomi's blood until being attacked by Naomi, who suddenly dies. After a confrontation between Jack and Locke, Kate decides to stay with Jack, but questions Sawyer when he decides to go with Locke. Later, they come across Daniel Faraday, whom they believe has arrived to rescue them. After finding Miles, Kate and Jack find themselves at gunpoint until she takes them to Naomi's body.

Later, they team up with Frank, who managed to arrive on the island with the helicopter. Upon learning of the location of the final team member, Charlotte Staples Lewis, Kate accompanies Sayid and Miles to the barracks. They are eventually captured by Locke. Kate decides to remain at the barracks, in an attempt to extract information from Miles. She arranges for him to speak to Ben, but is caught by Locke. She spends the night with Sawyer (although they did not have sex) and tells him that she is not pregnant. They argue over his exaggerated show of relief. Sawyer accuses her of bouncing back and forth between him and Jack. Kate slaps him on the face and then heads back to the beach. When Sawyer returns with Miles and Aaron, she also takes over as Aaron's primary caretaker when Sawyer reveals that Claire has gone missing. Later, Sayid and Kate follow Jack and Sawyer to avoid them being attacked by the boat's soldiers. They meet up with the remaining Others and join forces to defeat the boat's soldiers. They all board Lapidus' helicopter, but as they travel back to the freighter a fuel leak is discovered, and after all the excess weight is thrown out, Sawyer kisses Kate, then asks her to do a favor for him back home and jumps out.

=== After the Island ===
In "Eggtown", Kate goes on trial for her father's murder. Jack testifies on her behalf as a character witness. He lies under oath and tells the court that it was Kate that saved him and the other survivors. Under cross-examination, he is asked whether he loves the defendant and he replies "Not anymore." Kate looks crestfallen and demands that Jack's testimony cease. Kate's mother, the prosecution's star witness, tries to reconcile with Kate, and then decides not to testify. She is consequently released on ten years probation, provided that she does not leave California. Kate meets up with Jack after she is released and he confesses to her that he lied on the stand (about no longer loving her) and Kate is delighted. She invites him to come home with her, but he hesitates because he is not ready to see Aaron (his nephew) again. In "Something Nice Back Home", Kate is seen living in an established relationship with Jack, who is also acting as a surrogate father for his nephew Aaron. Later, Jack asks Kate to marry him, which she happily accepts. Jack later confronts Kate about her "errands", which involved her meeting with Sawyer's daughter; Clementine and his ex-girlfriend Cassidy. Kate refuses to tell Jack any details about this, as she knows Sawyer would not want anybody else to know. Jack is angered by her secrecy and raises his voice, waking Aaron up. Kate rushes to comfort him then Jack leaves, paranoid, ending their relationship.

In "Through the Looking Glass", Jack informs her of John Locke's funeral. Jack then tells her that they need to return to the island, but Kate grows furious and leaves.

==== Season 5 ====
Kate is surprisingly confronted by Dan Norton, a lawyer who is asking for a blood sample from both her and Aaron to determine their biological relationship. Norton refuses to tell Kate who his client is, and Kate refuses to give him a blood sample. Kate visits Sun, who convinces her to go see Norton and try to get him to reveal who his client is. Kate leaves Aaron in Sun's care while visiting Norton's firm, but cannot get a name out of him. Kate and Jack follow Norton to his clients house, who turns out to be Claire's mother. Jack goes in to talk to her and then realizes that she isn't the client they were looking for. When approached by Ben later, Kate discovers that he was the one who was trying to get a blood sample from her.

Kate realizes that she is not supposed to raise Aaron and leaves him in the care of Claire's mother. She goes to Jack's apartment and they spend the night together. She returns to the island with the other survivors on flight 316. Sawyer explains that the year is 1977 and secretly gets her, Jack and Hurley to join the Dharma Initiative. Sayid shoots a young Ben Linus and Kate and Sawyer save his life by bringing him to Richard Alpert. After refusing to aid Jack in his plans to detonate the hydrogen bomb, Kate returns to the Dharma Initiative, to then be put on the Dharma sub with Sawyer and Juliet. However, she insists that the three leave the submarine to prevent Jack from detonating the bomb. When the three return to the island, they eventually reunite with Jack, Jin, Sayid and Hurley. Although Sawyer tries to persuade Jack not to use the bomb, his efforts are in vain and they fight. Kate tells Jack that if he really believes that detonating the bomb is the best thing, then she will help him, while Sawyer reluctantly agrees to go along with the plan after Juliet also takes Jack's side. Kate assists Jack in getting the bomb to the required location, but when he drops it down a tunnel, it does not go off, despite the fact that it is supposed to explode on impact. Jack, Kate, Sawyer and Juliet are shocked, but immediately, the Dharma drill that had been drilling deep into the pocket of magnetic energy that Jack was trying to contain went too far, and Juliet is ultimately dragged down the tunnel, into the source of the energy. Kate and Sawyer try to get her out but the strength of the magnetism is too much and she is pulled into the tunnel. Kate attempts to remove a distressed Sawyer from the scene along with Jack, unaware that Juliet remains conscious for now and desperately attempts to detonate the bomb, eventually succeeding.

==== Season 6 ====
Kate continues her mission to reunite Claire with Aaron. When she eventually finds her, she discovers that a dark side has grown in Claire, who has become unstable due to many years of living alone, in the belief that the others are holding her son hostage in a Temple. Sawyer escapes from the Temple and Kate follows him to apologize for the loss of Juliet and to ask him to help her find Claire. Sawyer assures Kate she is not to blame, and reveals his intention to propose to Juliet. Kate breaks down, and ultimately returns to the Temple to get Claire. When Kate joins the Man in Black's camp, after Claire learns that it was Kate who took Aaron and attempts to murder Kate by throwing her to the ground and pulling a knife on her. Kate is saved by 'Locke' and seeing that Kate is upset by the loss of Claire's friendship, warns her that Claire should not be reunited with Aaron as she is now 'crazy'. Claire later tearfully apologises for her actions and thanks Kate for keeping her son safe.

Kate, (who has since grouped up with 'Locke') plans a breakout from the Man in Black's party, Kate wants to bring Claire but Sawyer refuses, saying she is no longer the friend they once knew following her attack on Kate. When Claire sees them leaving her behind again she gives chase and holds them at gunpoint just as they attempt to board a boat to escape. Kate talks Claire around, convincing her to come with them so she can finally go home to her son.

The group try to leave on Widmore's sub, and Kate is shot through the right collarbone. Once on board, while Jack is tending to Kate's wound, they discover that the Man in Black has placed a C4 explosive on board. Sawyer inadvertently causes the timer to count down faster and Sayid, Jin and Sun are killed in the resulting explosion. Jack asks Hurley to take care of Kate and make sure that he takes her to safety off the sinking vessel. On the shore, Kate races over to Jack and is relieved to find him safe. Kate, Jack and Hurley mourn the loss of their friends while Sawyer remains unconscious.

As the Man in Black starts to destroy the Island, Kate helps Jack kill him by shooting him. Jack is wounded in the fight with 'Locke' and he and Kate part for the final time due to their different destinies. Jack and Kate share a passionate kiss and declare their love for each other one last time before Jack leaves with Hurley to save the Island, and Kate goes to fulfill her promise to find Claire before departing on the Ajira plane, piloted by Frank. Along the way, they find Claire, who is scared to leave the island as she feels she is no longer a fit mother. Kate convinces her that her worries are normal and promises to help her. Kate escapes the island on the plane with Claire, Sawyer, Miles, Frank and Richard - Kate hand in hand with Claire.

In the Sideways, Kate remembers her life when she helps deliver Aaron at the concert. Kate waits at the concert so she can reunite with Jack. She finds him and tells him "I've missed you so much", a reference that she probably lived a long life after leaving the Island and missed Jack profoundly. Jack eventually awakens and remembers Kate and his friends. Together with Jack at her side, they move on together.

== Development ==
Before the pilot was shot, and during the writing phase, Kate was to emerge as the leader for the survivors, motivating them to build shelter and begin considering life as permanent residents of the island, however when it was decided Jack should survive, she was a second-in-command.

In this original description for Kate, she was a slightly older woman separated from her husband, who went to the bathroom in the tail-section of the plane. However, that idea ended up being used for Rose Henderson (L. Scott Caldwell) and her husband Bernard Nadler (Sam Anderson). Kate is involved in a love triangle with Jack (Matthew Fox) and Sawyer (Josh Holloway) and is seen as very protective of Claire (Emilie de Ravin) and her baby Aaron.

In the initial plans, Jack was going to die midway through the first episode and then Kate would emerge as the leader. She was not going to be a fugitive; instead, her husband was going to go to the bathroom shortly before the plane split in mid-air and she would remain adamant on the Island that he was alive. This ended up being used for Rose's character. The producers were impressed with Canadian Evangeline Lilly's audition, as she displayed the confidence with vulnerability that they were looking for. However, as this was Lilly's first role, she had difficulty obtaining a visa to work in the United States. She was supposed to start on the first day of filming, but the schedule was rearranged to give her more time and, in the meantime, the producers began auditioning again in case the visa did not come through. However, during one of the auditions, they got an email confirming that she had obtained her visa and could start work on the show. Executive producer Damon Lindelof told about Lilly's casting:

Evangeline was a complete and total unknown. We had read 60 to 65 women for the role of Kate. We were fast-forwarding through a tape, and he [Abrams] saw her and said, 'That's the girl'.

== Reception ==
Some critics considered Kate Austen to be one of the more weakly written characters of Lost. Evangeline Lilly, who portrayed Kate, was critical of the way her character was written saying that “I did throw scripts across rooms when I'd read them . . . because I would get very frustrated by the diminishing amount of autonomy she had and the diminishing amount of her own story there was to play.” Alan Sepinwall of The Star-Ledger did not find Kate to be "nearly as compelling a central character as Sayid or Hurley (or some of the freighter people, for that matter)."

In reviewing the episode "What Kate Does" in 2010, critic Emily VanDerWerff of the Los Angeles Times stated that though "Kate's one of the show's most important characters,... she's also one of the series' most obvious missed opportunities."

When discussing the mistreatment of women and minorities in the series finale "The End" and the later seasons as a whole, Sady Doyle of Slant gave a negative assessment of Kate's arc stating, "Spunky, disobedient Kate was passed between Jack and Sawyer like a football before motherhood gave her life true purpose."

In 2023, Caroline Bernstein of Collider evaluated the show's "questionable-at-best treatment" of its female characters. She remarked that "any real plot or character development for Kate is more or less thrown out the window" by the end of its second season.

Assessing her mistreatment in relation to both writing and fandom as a whole, Bernstein remarked:

In a chicken-or-egg type of paradox, Kate became one of the least favorite characters among fans during Lost's original run, which poses the question of whether she was hated for bad plotlines and inconsistent personality or given bad storylines because the writers didn't know where to go with her character beyond a certain point. [...] Kate became somewhat of a scapegoat in the fandom for all things wrong with the show, thus perpetuating the cycle of thinly veiled misogyny.

On the other hand, Robert Bianco of USA Today said Lilly's performance in the season four episode "Eggtown" was worthy of a Primetime Emmy Award nomination. Lilly's performance in "Whatever Happened, Happened" also received praise from TV critics and fans of the show alike. Lilly got a Golden Globe nomination for best dramatic actress in a lead role for her work in season 3.

Lifestyle website Beliefnet named her among the Top 10 Most Empowering Women on TV Today.
