= Sayid Jarrah =

Fictional character of the TV series Lost

Sayid Jarrah سَعِید جَرَّاح
- Lost character
- Naveen Andrews as Sayid Jarrah
- First appearance: "Pilot (Part 1)"
- Last appearance: "The End"
- Created by: Jeffrey Lieber; J. J. Abrams; Damon Lindelof
- Portrayed by: Naveen Andrews
- Centric episode(s): "Solitary" "The Greater Good" "One of Them" "Enter 77" "The Economist" "There's No Place Like Home, Part 1 & 3" "The Incident, Part 1" "He's Our You" "LA X, Part 1 & 2" "Sundown" "The Last Recruit" "The End"

In-universe information
- Full name: Sayid Hassan Jarrah
- Species: Human
- Gender: Male
- Spouse: Noor "Nadia" Abed Jaseem
- Relatives: Omer Jarrah (brother)
- Nationality: Iraqi
- Former residence: Tikrit, Iraq

Sayid Hassan Jarrah (Note: Arabic: سَعِيد حَسَّان جَرَّاح, Sa‘īd Ḥassān Jarrāḥ) is a fictional character from the ABC television series Lost, portrayed by Naveen Andrews.

== Appearances ==
=== Prior to the crash ===
Sayid originally served as a communications officer in Iraq's Special Republican Guard and was a skilled radio and mechanical engineer. Sayid served in the Gulf War and was captured by the U.S. military. He was the only one in his unit who spoke English so he was told to extract information from his captured commanding officer. He also met Kelvin Inman who was working for military intelligence at the time. He explained that Sayid's commanding officer had committed war crimes against the civilian population and gave him a tool box saying that Sayid would have to force his CO to give them the information they wanted. After he had tortured his old boss Inman told Sayid in Arabic that now he had the skills to do whatever was necessary and he gave him some money before letting him go. Later Sayid served as a coercive interrogator for the Guard for 5 years. At one point while in this capacity, he was ordered to interrogate an insurgent prisoner who turned out to be his childhood friend, Nadia. During her captivity, they fell in love, and in their talks she provided the impetus for what would become Sayid's road to redemption. Unlike his other prisoners, he did not torture her, and, when he was ordered to execute her for noncompliance, he instead facilitated her escape.

Seven years later, in England, Sayid is picked up by ASIS and the CIA. They make him a deal: if Sayid can infiltrate a terrorist cell in Sydney, whose members he is familiar with, and uncover stolen C-4, then they will tell him where Nadia is.

Sayid accepts, and is dropped off in Australia, where he meets with his former college roommate, Essam, from Cairo University. Sayid convinces Essam to become a suicide bomber in order for the intelligence to take possession of the stolen explosives. At the last moment, however, Sayid admits that he is working with the CIA, and attempts to allow his friend to escape; Essam realizes that Sayid has deceived him over a woman, and kills himself. The CIA tell Sayid the whereabouts of Nadia and he is given a plane ticket to Los Angeles. However, he demands to recover the body of Essam, which will require him to stay one more day. Instead he is given a ticket for Oceanic Flight 815.

=== Season 1 ===
Sayid fixes the transceiver recovered from the cockpit, and leads a group into the jungle in order to send out a distress signal. Instead, he picks up a looping message (recorded by Danielle Rousseau). He tries to locate the message's origin, but is knocked out by Locke. When Shannon suffers from a near-fatal asthma attack, Sayid brutally interrogates Sawyer in an attempt to recover Shannon's medication. Having again broken his promise never to torture again, Sayid leaves the beach to explore the island. In the jungle, he is captured by Rousseau, who tells him she was part of a science team which crashed on the island. She identifies the Others as the carriers of a sickness that her companions caught. Sayid doesn't believe her, and leaves.

Upon returning, he seeks Shannon's help in translating maps stolen from Danielle. The two bond and eventually form a relationship. After Boone's death, Locke asks for Shannon's forgiveness. Shannon confronts Locke in the jungle, but Sayid tackles her just as she fires a gun. That night, Sayid tells Locke to take him to the hatch. Rousseau arrives on the beach one morning with news that the Others are coming to abduct a child. Later, he learns that Claire's baby, Aaron, has been kidnapped by Rousseau. Sayid surmises that Rousseau intends to attempt an exchange of Claire's baby for her own child, Alex, with the "Others". Sayid and Charlie find Rousseau's hiding place, and Rousseau returns the baby.

=== Season 2 ===
Shannon tells Sayid that she has seen Walt in the jungle, but he suggests she was dreaming. Shannon tells him she's going to find Walt. After an argument, Sayid tells Shannon that he loves her and will never leave her. Then they see Walt, and Shannon dashes after him. He then witnesses Ana Lucia shooting Shannon, who dies in his arms. Ana Lucia ties him up and interrogates him. She then frees Sayid, drops her weapon, and dares Sayid to take his revenge, but he refuses. Some time later, Danielle takes Sayid to a man she captured, who she suspects is an Other. The man identifies himself as Henry Gale, saying he crashed in a hot-air balloon on the island about four months ago. Sayid frees the man and brings him to the hatch, and tells Locke about him. Sayid tries to find out more by torturing Henry, until he is stopped by Jack.

In the jungle, Sayid, Charlie, and Ana Lucia discover Henry Gale's grave, along with the balloon. Henry Gale's photograph from his driver license found at the grave site makes it clear that the man identifying himself as Henry Gale is not actually Henry Gale. When he learns of Michael's return, and the deaths of Ana Lucia and Libby, Sayid tells Jack that he suspects Michael has been "compromised", and plans to follow him somehow. Fortunately, Desmond unexpectedly returns with his boat, and Sayid plans on using it. He asks Jin to accompany him, but Sun insists on joining them. They arrive at the Others' camp, only to learn that it is merely a decoy.

In the season it is revealed that during the Gulf War, Sayid's base was captured by the Americans. The only Iraqi in his squad who can speak English, Sayid is forced to ask his superior officer about a missing U.S. pilot by Kate Austen's father, Sam Austen, who was part of the American army stationed in Iraq. When Sayid learns of a planned attack on his home village, his head captor, Kelvin Inman forces Sayid to torture his superior officer to gain the information of the missing pilot, who he learns was executed earlier. At the end of the Gulf War, Sayid is released back into the Republican Guard. Inman tells him that he now has a valuable gift of being able to gain information.

=== Season 3 ===
Sayid plans to lure the Others to the pier, in an attempt to kidnap and torture two of them for interrogation. However, their plan backfires when the Others arrive via the sea and hijack the boat. Sayid and the Kwons make their way back to their camp. Upon returning, Sayid joins a group on a trek to the Pearl station. Once there, Sayid gains brief surveillance footage from another station, where they see an eye-patched man. When Kate and Sawyer return, Sayid and Locke join her and Rousseau in rescuing Jack.

The four arrive at the Flame station, where they encounter Mikhail, the man they saw in the surveillance feed of the Pearl. After a big struggle, Mikhail is defeated by Sayid and Kate, who tie him up. Sayid enters the basement of the Flame, and takes some maps of the different stations. The five move along, following the maps' indications, towards the Barracks, until they come across a sonar panel fencing, where Mikhail collapses. The four later arrive at the Others' barracks, where they watch as Jack bonds with the Others. That night, Sayid and Kate infiltrate the barracks, only to be captured by the Others. He is then gassed the next day, released only when Juliet discovers him. He returns to the beach with Jack, Kate and Juliet.

Sayid attempts to interrogate Juliet on the journey, but she says that if she tells him everything, then he will kill her. Sayid is soon informed of Naomi's presence, and after speaking to her begins to question her; he is taken aback when she gives him her satellite phone, having expected her to have no way to contact her boat. The next day, Sayid is taken into the jungle, where Jack and Juliet come clean and reveal their secret plans to destroy the Others. When Karl warns them of their imminent arrival, Sayid remains on the beach to detonate the dynamite, along with Jin and Bernard. That night, Sayid shoots his target accurately, but ultimately winds up captured by the remaining three Others. Hurley runs over Ryan Pryce using the DHARMA Van, killing him; when the other walks in front of Sayid, Sayid trips him up and snaps his neck. He, along with Sawyer, Juliet, Hurley, Jin and Bernard wait at the beach for rescue.

The season reveals that Sayid left the Iraqi Special Republican Guard in order to find Nadia. He travelled to Paris, where he worked as a chef. Some time later, Sayid is taken prisoner and locked in the pantry. A person named Sami recognizes Sayid as the man who tortured his wife with boiling oil, and attempts to beat a confession out of him. When Sami's wife, Amira, confronts Sayid, he finally admits to torturing her, and tearfully apologizes to her. Sayid is forgiven, and Amira tells Sami that Sayid is not the man who tortured her after all; Sayid is released soon after.

=== Season 4 ===
Jack and Locke have a confrontation, and Sayid elects to remain with Jack. He goes out to hunt for more of the people who crashed on the helicopter. Sayid then makes a trade with Locke for Charlotte, whom he brings back to Jack and the helicopter. Charlotte then does not want to go home, so Sayid, Desmond, and a dead Naomi get on the helicopter. During the helicopter ride, Sayid witnesses Desmond's time travel. In the boat, Sayid helps Desmond to communicate with his girlfriend in order to stop the travels.

Later, they wait on deck to meet with the captain of the freighter, Gault. Gault tells them his employer is Charles Widmore. Later they find Michael Dawson, who tells Sayid that he is a spy. Sayid and Desmond later witness Keamy's furious return to the boat after his failed attempt to capture Ben. Fearing Keamy's intentions, he persuades Gault to give him and Desmond a Zodiac boat to return to the island, hoping to save as many people as possible by moving them from the island to the boat.

Sayid returns to the beach on the freighter's Zodiac. Sayid and Kate go after Jack and Sawyer, who are following a homing beacon left by Lapidus. They are captured by Richard Alpert (Nestor Carbonell) and the rest of the Others. He and the Others successfully ambush Keamy and his mercenaries by sending Kate out to them, and then getting into a gunfight with them. They then go to the helicopter with Jack, Hurley, Sawyer and Lapidus, but Sawyer leaves them to reduce the weight. They are able to land on the ship, but are quickly informed that the ship is about to explode. They quickly refuel, and pick up Desmond, Sun, and Aaron, before lifting off. On the way back to the island, they see a white light envelop it, before the entire island appears to sink beneath the waves. They drift for several hours, but are eventually rescued by another boat owned by Penelope Widmore. Jack also informs all of them that they will have to lie about their entire experience on the island in order to protect the people still there from Charles Widmore.

At a press conference held by Oceanic Airlines Sayid is finally reunited with Nadia, and some time later the two get married. However, his and Nadia's happiness is abruptly cut short when she is killed in a car accident, and Sayid decides to hold her funeral in their home country. In the first part of The Incident, it is revealed that Nadia was actually killed by a car, and more significantly a car that would have also killed Sayid had it not been for the intervention of Jacob who, posing as a tourist, asks Sayid for directions, preventing him from crossing the road at the crucial moment. At the funeral, Sayid spots Ben spying on him. Ben tells Sayid about Nadia's killer, Bakir, whereupon Sayid carries out his revenge by shooting him repeatedly. Following this event, Sayid eventually begins working for Ben as an assassin, after being informed that Nadia's death was part of a larger plan orchestrated by Charles Widmore.

On one such mission, Sayid travels to Berlin, Germany, where he meets a woman named Elsa. The two bond quickly, but the relationship is cut short when Elsa, who works for one of Sayid's targets, learns about his true intentions, and injures him; Sayid shoots her. Sayid is later visited by Locke who asks him to return with him to the Island, but he refuses. In Los Angeles, Sayid kills a man who was staked out in front of the Santa Rosa Mental Hospital, and breaks Hurley out of the mental institution.

=== Season 5 ===
Sayid is wounded in a fight at his motel, and Hurley takes him home and has his father get Jack to treat Sayid. Upon awakening, Sayid refuses to cooperate with Jack and Ben's plan to return everyone to the island; however; he appears the next day in law enforcement custody (whom he could have beaten up and killed) on board the plane.

Sayid's first appearance on the island takes place in 1977, when he vanished along with Jack, Kate, and Hurley en route from Los Angeles to Guam on Ajira Flight 316. After making his way to where the Dharma Initiative Station The Flame was located, he is captured by Jin. As a prisoner at the barracks, Sayid meets a young Benjamin Linus. Despite attempts by Sawyer to try to expedite his escape, he refuses to cooperate, leading him to be chemically interrogated by a shaman-like Dharma Initiative member. Later, Ben stages a fire to give him the cover and helps free Sayid in hopes he would take him to the Others. However, during the escape, Sayid shoots Ben, leaving him for dead, before escaping into the jungle.

Sayid reappears in "Follow the Leader" as Jack, Kate, Richard, Eloise Hawking, a younger Charles Widmore, and an unnamed Other are walking through the jungle towards the hydrogen bomb, "Jughead". He fires his weapon and kills one of the Others after the man threatens to shoot Kate on the way to the ruins. Shortly before "The Incident" is about to occur, Sayid and Jack pose as Dharma employees and attempt to smuggle a core piece of the hydrogen bomb to the Swan Station. However; they are discovered by Roger Linus, and Sayid is shot in the ensuing chaos. Sayid is last seen in the Dharma van with Hurley and Miles, who state that Sayid will probably die from his wounds.

=== Season 6 ===
In the premiere of Season 6, "LA X", in the timeline that follows the survivors on the island, Sayid is taken to the Temple. Hurley and some of the other survivors also go to the Temple in order to heal him, which at the time is unsuccessful. Although his death is confirmed, Sayid unexpectedly gets up from the ground. Sayid is then taken by Dogen to be 'tested' and is branded. He is told he passed, but Jack is told later that Sayid is "infected."

Sayid leaves the Temple after being asked by Dogen to kill the Smoke Monster with a blade. The knife proves worthless but the Smoke Monster (in Locke's form) allows Sayid to live and return to the temple with a message. Sayid indeed returns and warns everyone to leave or else they will all die. He then proceeds to confront Dogen and murders him and Lennon, allowing the Smoke Monster into the Temple to kill those who didn't defect. When Ilana's group rushes in to rescue the "candidates" (people whom Jacob has chosen to possibly replace him as leader of the Island), Ben attempts to coax Sayid to leaving with them. Sayid sinisterly replies otherwise. Ben runs off. The "infection" Dogen had spoken of appears to be a type of mind control that the Man in Black has placed over Sayid.

Sayid, the Man in Black, Claire, Kate Austen, and a group of the Others leave the Temple shortly after. In "The Package", the Man in Black asks Sayid to spy on Charles Widmore and his team on the other Island. Sayid agrees, but mentions that, by this time, he is devoid of any emotion: pain, happiness, etc. Upon arriving at the shore of the second Island, he secretly watches a heavily sedated Desmond being dragged out of Widmore's submarine by two of Widmore's crew. He waits in the sidelines for a few moments, and then he kills several of Widmore's men and has Desmond follow him. The next day, he ties Desmond to a tree and fetches the Man in Black. Sayid is ordered back to their camp. When the Man in Black returns, Sayid asks him about Desmond; the Man in Black tells him not to worry. Soon after, Hurley, Jack, Frank Lapidus, and Sun arrive. Sayid, of course, shows no surprise at the sight of them. When Widmore's team threatens to waylay their camp with artillery shells, the Man in Black orders everyone to start leaving and orders Sayid to kill Desmond. Sayid heads to the well wherein Desmond was imprisoned by the Man in Black, but instead of killing him, converses with him, and reveals that the Man in Black has promised to resurrect the woman he loves. When Desmond asks Sayid why he believes this, Sayid reveals it was the Man in Black who resurrected him after his death. Later, Sayid catches up with the Man in Black, telling him he has killed Desmond, which he later tells Jack is false; his conversation with Desmond seems to have broken the Man in Black's spell over him.

The Man in Black plants a bomb in Jack's knapsack in order to kill the candidates, but Sayid later participates in the group's betrayal of the Man in Black. Upon boarding Widmore's submarine, the bomb is discovered. Sayid tells Jack where to find Desmond and then sacrifices himself to save the others, taking the bomb and running with it as it explodes.

=== Afterlife ===
In the flash sideways, Sayid is still a former Republican Guard torturer, but now works for an oil company. He flies to Los Angeles to visit Nadia; believing he didn't deserve her, he'd "pushed" her to his brother Omer, and they are now married with children.

Aboard Flight 815, Sayid kicks in a lavatory door to save a passenger, Charlie Pace, who'd locked himself inside. He runs into a fellow passenger at baggage claim then takes a cab to Nadia and Omer's house, where he meets them and their two children, Eva and Sam. A call takes Omer from dinner early, and the children, looking for presents, find a picture of Nadia in Sayid's bag. That night, Omer asks for his help with a loan shark to whom he has become indebted, capitalizing on Sayid's feelings for Nadia, but Sayid tells Omer he is "not that man" anymore.

The next day, Omer is attacked, and Nadia urges Sayid not to take revenge. The men responsible come to Sayid and bring him to a restaurant to meet the loan shark: Martin Keamy. Keamy tries to get him to pay Omer's debt, but Sayid uses one of the men as a human shield then shoots Keamy and the other henchman. Leaving, he finds a prisoner in the freezer, and after some thought, he gives him a box cutter to free himself.

A camera catches him fleeing the carnage, and the tape eventually reaches the LAPD ("LA X, Parts 1 & 2") ("Sundown") ("The Package") ("The Last Recruit"). Sayid returns to Omer and Nadia's house and packs to flee. Nadia asks what he's done. Just then a police detective knocks on the door. Sayid runs out the back door but Detective James Ford trips him up, holds him at gunpoint and arrests him.

He meets Desmond Hume while in custody. Later, while Sayid, Desmond, and Kate Austen are being taken from holding to prison, Desmond offers to help him escape in exchange for a future favor. Sayid agrees with facetious gravity. The escorting officer frees them, and Hugo Reyes arrives, handing her a bribe. Hurley then drives Sayid to the Flightline Motel and offers him a tranquilizer gun to remind him of their previous adventures there. Sayid refuses.

Hurley abducts a victim and they drive next to a bar's parking lot. Two men emerge from a bar fighting, followed by a woman who attempts to stop them and is knocked to the ground. Sayid runs to her aid, and as they touch, Shannon and Sayid remember each other and their lives. They next go to the church and sit together as a bright light covers them ("The Last Recruit") ("What They Died For") ("The End").

== Development ==
Sayid was not in the original draft of the pilot episode, but the producers knew early on that they wanted an international cast. Executive consultant Jeff Pinkner had worked with Naveen Andrews on a short-lived ABC series called The Beast, and was keen to have him on Lost. The producers were surprised that Andrews was interested in the role. When they cast him, all Andrews was told was that Sayid was from Iraq and had been in the army.

== Reception ==
Sayid was a fan favorite since the show's inception. Chris Carabott of IGN stated that in the episode "The Economist", "Sayid Jarrah is a badass who could give Jack Bauer, James Bond, and Jason Bourne all a run for their money". Faisal Abbas, Media Editor of the London-based international Arabic daily Asharq Al-Awsat, considered that Jarrah, along with other 'heroic' Muslim characters (such as Sleeper Cell's Darwyn al-Sayeed) who emerged in American media after the 9/11 terrorist attacks, are proof that Arabs and Muslims have been undertaking more prominent roles within the media since those events. Entertainment Weekly describes "tortured Sayid" as a "captivating minor character".

When reviewing the series finale, Sady Doyle of Slant noted Sayid's declining role on Lost from "awesome" to "dispensable" in comparison to the white male characters as the series drew to a close. She also noted the "subversive" nature of an Iraqi soldier as a series regular 18 months after the US declared war on Iraq. When referring to his death in "The Candidate", she said: "Sayid was killed, resurrected, and then forced to re-kill himself with a bomb. A “suicide bomb,” you might say. Yeah."
