= Tricia Tanaka Is Dead =

- Lost episode
- Episode no.: Season 3 Episode 10
- Directed by: Eric Laneuville
- Written by: Edward Kitsis; Adam Horowitz
- Cinematography by: Cort Fey
- Editing by: Mark J. Goldman
- Production code: 310
- Original air date: February 28, 2007
- Running time: 43 minutes

Guest appearances
- Cheech Marin as David Reyes; Mira Furlan as Danielle Rousseau; Lillian Hurst as Carmen Reyes; Suzanne Krull as Lynn Karnoff; Sung-Hi Lee as Tricia Tanaka; Billy Ray Gallion as Randy Nations; Caden Waidyatilleka as Young Hurley

Episode chronology
← Previous "Stranger in a Strange Land"	Next → "Enter 77"
- Lost season 3

"Tricia Tanaka Is Dead" is the tenth episode of the third season of the American drama television series Lost, and the show's 59th episode overall. The episode was written by Edward Kitsis and Adam Horowitz and directed by Eric Laneuville. It first aired on ABC in the United States on February 28, 2007. The character of Hugo "Hurley" Reyes (Jorge Garcia) is featured in the episode's flashbacks, as he reminisces over his father (guest star Cheech Marin) abandoning his family for seventeen years. On the island, Hurley works with Jin-Soo Kwon (Daniel Dae Kim) and James "Sawyer" Ford (Josh Holloway) to repair an old Volkswagen camper van while Kate Austen (Evangeline Lilly) ponders what to do about the still-captured Jack Shephard (Matthew Fox).

"Tricia Tanaka Is Dead" was seen by an estimated 12.78 million viewers. In interviews, Garcia, Dae Kim, and Holloway commented that they had fun shooting their scenes, as they had not worked together for a while. The episode marked the first appearance of recurring guest actor Cheech Marin. The episode received polarized reviews; many praised its humor and focus on Hurley while others emphasized that little was learned concerning the show's overall mythology.

== Plot ==
=== Flashbacks ===
Young Hurley (Caden Waidyatilleka) joins his father, David Reyes (Cheech Marin), over an old Camaro that they want to repair. It won't start however, and David assures him good things happen when you believe they will, and that in this world you have to "make your own luck." While leaving for Las Vegas, David gives Hurley a chocolate bar and promises to return soon. Notably, young Hurley is not overweight at all in this scene, and he comments that his mother doesn't approve of him eating sweets, implying that this was the event that caused Hurley to become overweight.

Now an adult, Hurley (Jorge Garcia) watches as his new Mr. Cluck's chicken restaurant gets hit by a meteorite, killing those inside, including Tricia Tanaka (Sung-Hi Lee), the newswoman who just interviewed him about his lottery winnings. Hurley arrives home, telling his mother his intent to go to Australia to end the bad luck curse he believes was bestowed upon him after he won the lottery. She tries to disprove the curse by revealing his father has returned to them after seventeen years. Suspecting his father of only wanting the lottery money, Hurley reacts angrily. David brings his son to a tarot card reader (Suzanne Krull), who tells Hurley she can 'remove' the curse before admitting that David paid her to say this. Hurley vows to give the money away, and begins packing for Australia. David acknowledges he just returned for the money, but approves of Hurley's decision and promises he will be waiting for him when Hurley gets back.

=== On the Island ===
On the island, Hurley sorrowfully speaks to Libby's grave about what happened to Jack Shephard (Matthew Fox), Kate Austen (Evangeline Lilly) and James "Sawyer" Ford (Josh Holloway) after they were taken by the Others. Hurley learns that Charlie Pace (Dominic Monaghan) believes that Desmond Hume (Henry Ian Cusick) sees visions of Charlie's death. Hurley believes this and tells Charlie that he thinks he brings bad luck. Vincent the dog shows up with a mummified human arm, leading Hurley to a Volkswagen camper van on its side underneath the foliage. Inside is a skeleton wearing a DHARMA Initiative jumpsuit sporting the name "Roger" on its chest and the Swan station's logo. On the beach, Hurley's requests for help are turned down. Jin-Soo Kwon (Daniel Dae Kim), who doesn't understand what Hurley is saying, is roped into helping.

Hurley finds beer in the van and a returned Sawyer outside. He learns from Sawyer that he and Kate escaped but Jack is still prisoner. Hurley is very optimistic about the future and volunteers Sawyer to help him fix the van. Meanwhile, Desmond refuses to tell Charlie when he will die. Kate informs Sayid Jarrah (Naveen Andrews) of all she knows about the Others and then leaves, saying she's going to get help to rescue Jack, but she won't say from whom.

Hurley, Jin and Sawyer raid the van and find maps and beer. Meanwhile, Hurley tells Charlie to stop moping and help him start the car, saying that he might die doing it but they should make their own luck, face death, and possibly win. Hurley eventually convinces the others to push the van to a slope in order to get it started. Despite Sawyer's warnings, Hurley goes through with the plan. Charlie declares "victory or death" and rides with Hurley, as Sawyer and Jin push the vehicle down the steep hill. At first it looks as though they will crash, but the van starts just in time. Later, the entire group enjoys a ride.

Hurley is later left with the van and continues driving. Jin gives Sun-Hwa Kwon (Yunjin Kim) a flower, Charlie talks with Claire Littleton (Emilie de Ravin) and Sawyer brings some beer for Kate but finds that she isn't around. Meanwhile, Kate meets up with John Locke (Terry O'Quinn) and Sayid on her way to find Danielle Rousseau (Mira Furlan), from whom she hopes to get help. Locke reveals he has compass readings from Mr. Eko's stick. Kate's recruiting of Rousseau seems to fail until she mentions her suspicions about Alex, who helped Kate escape, being Rousseau's daughter.

== Production ==
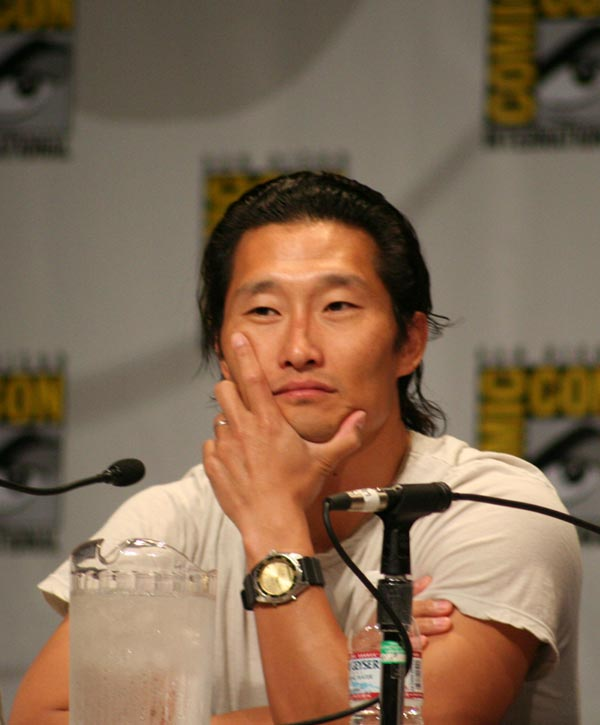
Actor Daniel Dae Kim (pictured) called the episode's comedic scenes "a nice change of pace".

Having worked with executive producer Carlton Cuse on Nash Bridges, guest actor Cheech Marin was called by Cuse requesting he appear on Lost, to which Marin responded "You know, that sounds like a lot of fun... It's in Hawaii, right? I can do that!'" Cuse later commented, "He's quite a good actor. People only think of him as the doobie-smoking '70s dude. But he played Tyne Daly's love interest in Judging Amy. C'mon!"

While shooting the episode, Jorge Garcia noted "the group on the beach has been quite big. They laid out the most cast chairs I've ever seen at one time since the pilot and it's been fun." Garcia previewed his character's flashback in a New York Post interview, "[it is] the kind of relationship Hurley has with his father and how it's changed from when he was a kid now that he's an adult and a lottery winner. He finds something on the island that brings him back to that time and that's how it all gets started". Actor Josh Holloway was told that an emotional undercurrent of the episode concerned his failed relationship with Kate. Holloway commented that Sawyer is thinking I have "my beer... but I don't have my girl. He's worried, and drowning it with beer".

To help train the dog playing Vincent for the episode's needed scenes, Madison was given the fake arm to take home and play with; when finally brought on the set, the crew had difficulty shooting her because Madison would bring and drop off the arm slightly differently each time, causing trouble recreating the same camera angles. Actor Daniel Dae Kim described their scenes with the beer in the DVD special features, "The comedic scenes with Josh were so much fun to play because it was a lighter side. A nice change of pace." Like their characters, the actors had not been in scenes together in a while, so Dae Kim thought it "was fun to catch up and have fun in the process". The episode featured Hurley driving a bus down a hill. To create this scene, Garcia had to drive the bus down a small hill "very stead[ily]" to ensure the cameraman could record it all; towards the end however, they told Garcia to just "go for it", allowing him to "cut loose a little". For the close-up shots of Garcia and Dominic Monaghan, the production crew would shake the bus to simulate driving, and brush various pieces of foliage across the windshield to make it seem the bus was hitting bushes or trees. A stunt double standing in for Garcia performed the largest hill in the drive down; they were unable to rehearse due to getting rained out, so their first rehearsal was done on film. Dae Kim commented that "it was just great to have as much fun on camera as we do off camera", and that there was no real acting that day, as they were all enjoying themselves as much as their characters. The Volkswagen campus van — still in operating condition — along with Hurley's Camaro, were later auctioned off with other Lost props and costumes at the Santa Monica Airport in 2010.

The song "Shambala" by Three Dog Night is used several times in the episode, both in Hurley's flashbacks and on the Island.

== Reception ==
On its original American broadcast on February 28, 2007, an estimated 12.78 million viewers tuned into the episode, making it the 24th most watched television program of the week.

After what he felt was a period of bad episodes culminating with "Stranger in a Strange Land", critic Andrew Dignan of Slant Magazine praised "Tricia Tanaka Is Dead" as a "palate cleanser, reminding us that this show is meant to be, above all else, fun". He described the episode as an "expected pleasure, disarming in a way [Lost] hasn't been since Season One, back before these people became jaded by "Others" and consumed with tedious busy work while the show's producers figured out what frequently disappointing direction to push them in next." Dignan did however acknowledge that others might not have found the episode as enjoyable as he did. Erin Martell of TV Squad was not sure what to think of the episode, believing that it was "entertaining" but produced nothing new for viewers. She did note that the characters are now in place to take action for following episodes, and hoped that the episode's "slow-moving events" were "building up to some serious resolution". Rather than dismiss the episode for lacking a mythology-related storyline, Jeff Jensen from Entertainment Weekly called it "a joyous and poignant hour of television", and said that it "could very well be a cleverly crafted allegory for the history of The Dharma Initiative on The Island." Alan Sepinwall called it the third season's best aired episode yet "by quite a stretch" for adding needed humor to the series and focusing on more of the cast and Hurley. He stated that "[b]y the episode's climax, I really cared about whether they could get that damn Microbus to start, even if it would only be useful for going around in circles."

New York Magazine put "Tricia Tanaka Is Dead" as third of its list of "Twenty Most Pointless Lost Episodes", claiming that "because with all his other problems, daddy issues don't feel like something that needs to be thrown at Hurley" and David could have been written as a positive character "just to add some variation to the bad-dad overkill on this show". IGN ranked "Tricia Tanaka Is Dead" as the second worst Lost episode, above only "Stranger in a Strange Land", explaining "Is there a better metaphor that Lost was running in circles at this point in Season 3 than seeing several of the castaways driving in circles on the island, with goofy grins on their faces?... With a dull story on the island and flashbacks weakly giving Hurley the requisite daddy issues so many of the other characters already had, it was clear Lost needed to make a big change soon to recapture what was special about the show. Thankfully, they did." A similar list by the Los Angeles Times ranked the episode much higher at 31, writing "The haters need to shut up. This is a nearly pure embrace of the Lost ethos. You make your own fate up until the moment when you don't."

Various reviewers praised Jorge Garcia's performance, with one believing the episode "was a reminder that Garcia's not only a wonderful (and much needed) comedic outlet for the show but a fine actor who specializes in intimate dramas of anxiety and self-realization".

Garcia submitted this episode for consideration for Outstanding Supporting Actor in a Drama Series at the 59th Primetime Emmy Awards.
