= House of the Rising Sun (Lost) =

- Lost episode
- Jin attacks Michael for him unknowingly taking a watch that belonged to his father-in-law and employer.
- Episode no.: Season 1 Episode 6
- Directed by: Michael Zinberg
- Written by: Javier Grillo-Marxuach
- Production code: 104
- Original air date: October 27, 2004
- Running time: 41 minutes

Guest appearance
- Sora Jung as Decorator

Episode chronology
← Previous "White Rabbit"	Next → "The Moth"
- Lost season 1

"House of the Rising Sun" is the sixth episode of the first season of the American television series Lost. It centers on Jin-Soo Kwon (Daniel Dae Kim), who brutally attacks Michael Dawson (Harold Perrineau); the survivors do not know why since Jin and his wife Sun-Hwa Kwon (Yunjin Kim) only speak Korean. Meanwhile, Jack Shephard (Matthew Fox) proposes that the survivors move to the caves from the beach. The episode was the first to feature the backstory of Sun and Jin, and the former is shown in the episode's flashbacks. It was directed by Michael Zinberg and written by Javier Grillo-Marxuach.

After being cast, Yunjin Kim and Daniel Dae Kim were nervous that their characters' relationship would foster negative perceptions of Korean people; the former felt that it was an outdated depiction which would influence a society little exposed to Korean culture. The actors discussed this with the series' producers, leading to the writing of "House of the Rising Sun" and the multifaceted depiction of their relationship. "House of the Rising Sun" first aired on October 27, 2004, on the American network ABC. An estimated 16.83 million viewers watched the episode on its first broadcast, and it earned a ratings share of 6.4/17, a slight increase from the previous episode. It received mainly positive reviews, with critics focusing on the revelations surrounding Jin and Sun's relationship.

== Plot ==
=== Flashbacks ===
Sun is at a party, and is served champagne by a waiter, Jin. They soon develop a relationship, with Sun wanting to run away with Jin to America, but Jin insisting they honorably tell her father that they are seeing each other. Sun's father approves of their relationship as long as Jin takes a job working for him. One night after they're married, Jin returns home covered in someone else's blood. Sun is angry that he refuses to explain the blood to her and slaps him. He tells Sun that he does whatever her father tells him to do. A few years later, Sun secretly plots to leave Jin and her father, so she will be free to go wherever she wants. However, she does not go through with her plans after he expresses a loving gesture to her, and boards Flight 815 with her husband.

=== On the Island ===
It is Day 7, September 28, 2004, and Jack Shephard, Kate Austen (Evangeline Lilly), Charlie Pace (Dominic Monaghan) and John Locke (Terry O'Quinn) go to the caves to gather water and investigate. Charlie steps on a beehive, and is told not to move by Locke or else the hive will snap. Charlie slaps at a bee on his face and shifts weight, causing the hive to snap and everyone to get stung.

Later, at the caves, the survivors discover two long-decomposed skeletons, one male and one female, whom Locke dubs as "Adam and Eve". From the deterioration of their clothes, Jack estimates that they have been dead for at least 40–50 years, and finds a pouch on them containing two stones: one black, one white.

Locke and Charlie are clearing the wreckage at the caves and Locke tells Charlie that he recognizes him from a band Charlie is in, Drive Shaft. Charlie is happy that finally someone, other than Kate, is familiar with his musical background.

Meanwhile, Sun is shocked to see Jin attack Michael on the beach for no apparent reason. James "Sawyer" Ford (Josh Holloway) and Sayid Jarrah (Naveen Andrews) manage to subdue and handcuff Jin to the wreckage. Michael says the attack was racially motivated, which he later tells his son, Walt Lloyd (Malcolm David Kelley), is not true. Sun finds Michael alone, and in fluent English says, "I need to talk to you." Michael is shocked that she speaks English. Sun tells him that Jin is unaware of this, and explains that Jin angrily attacked Michael because of the watch he's wearing, which belongs to her father. Michael says he just found it in the wreckage and it's nothing important.

Jack and Kate return to the beach and Jack starts talking to people about moving to the caves. The castaways argue whether to stay on the beach where a rescue party could see them (and keep the signal fire burning), or move to the caves, where there is more shelter and fresh water. The group splits into two camps accordingly: Jack, Locke, Charlie, Hugo "Hurley" Reyes (Jorge Garcia), Jin, Sun, Ethan Rom (William Mapother), Dr. Leslie Arzt (Daniel Roebuck), Doug, and Sullivan (Scott Paulin) move to the caves while Kate, Sawyer, Sayid, Claire Littleton (Emilie de Ravin), Michael Dawson (Harold Perrineau), Walt, Vincent (Madison), Shannon Rutherford (Maggie Grace), Boone Carlyle (Ian Somerhalder), Rose Nadler (L. Scott Caldwell), Scott Jackson (Christian Bowman), and Steve Jenkins (Dustin Watchman) remain on the beach.

At the caves, Locke tells Charlie that he knows Charlie is addicted to heroin. Locke says if Charlie gives up his drugs, the island will give him his guitar, which he misses deeply. Charlie hands over the heroin, Locke shows him where the guitar is, and Charlie is ecstatic. On the beach, Kate refuses to go with Jack to the caves. Michael menacingly approaches Jin with an axe, throws the watch at him, and shouts that the fight over the watch "is ridiculous, because time doesn't matter on a damn island." As Michael cuts Jin free of his handcuffs, one of the cuffs remains on his wrist, and Michael tells Jin to stay away from him and Walt. That night at the caves, Charlie plays his guitar as Jack returns with people from the beach. The episode ends with clips of the two groups, while Willie Nelson's 'Are You Sure' plays in the background.

== Production ==
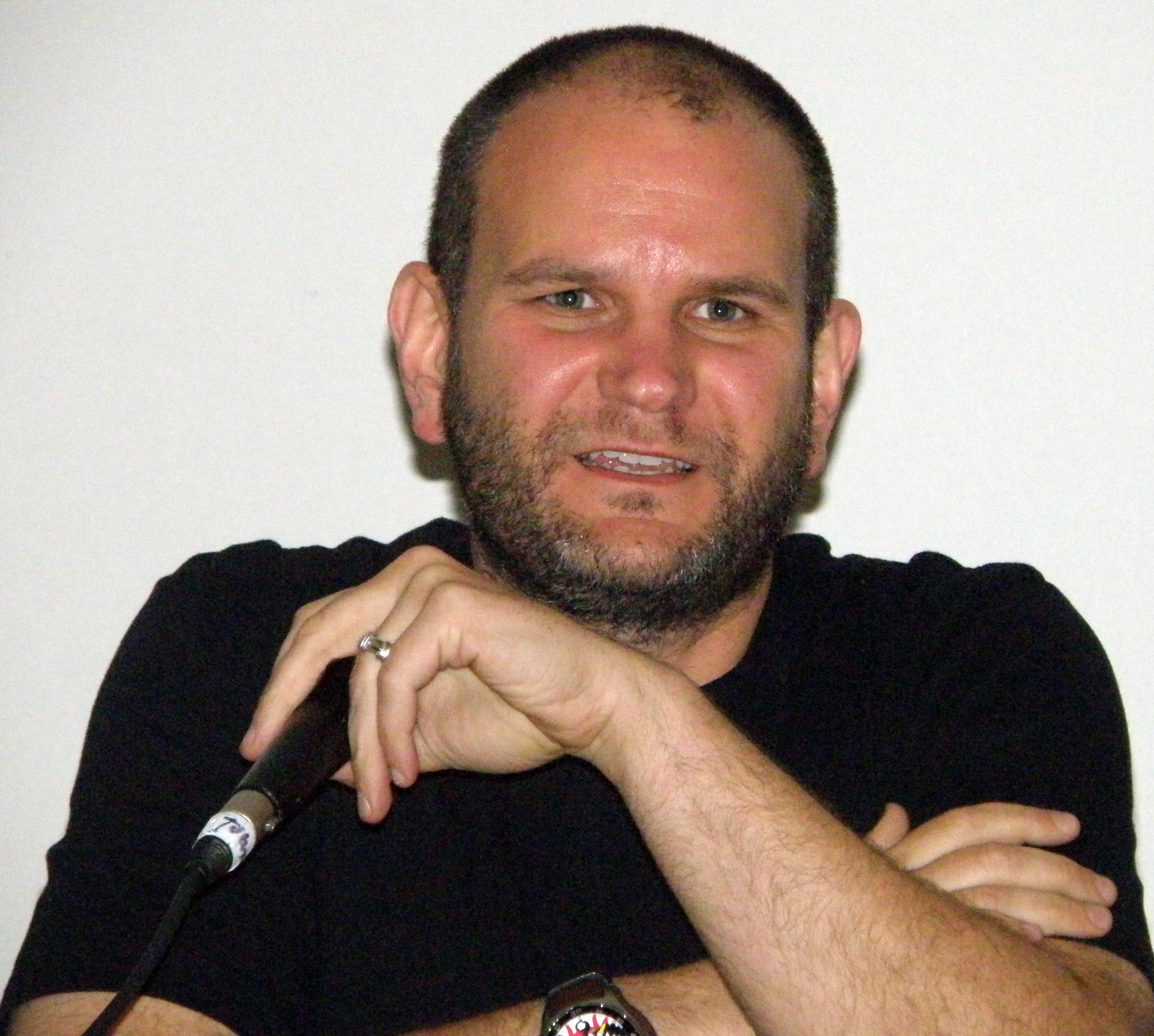
Supervising producer Javier Grillo-Marxuach wrote the episode.

Both Yunjin Kim and Daniel Dae Kim were born in Korea but raised in the United States. Yunjin Kim initially auditioned for the role of Kate, but the producers liked her so much that they created an entirely new character, part of "a couple [that's] alienated from the rest of the group because they can't communicate." A male Korean actor was sought out as Kim's co-star, with Dae Kim winning the part. He had moved from South Korea as a toddler and forgotten most of his Korean by the time he won the role of Jin; while Kim helped him with the language, his accent reportedly sounded poor to native speakers.

The episode title is a reference to the song "The House of the Rising Sun", popularized by English rock group The Animals in 1964. It was the first episode to reveal the backstory of Sun and Jin, with the former being the focus of the episode's flashbacks. Yunjin Kim felt the initial way in which Sun and Jin were portrayed represented an "outdated" depiction of a Korean relationship; she and others in the Korean community worried that this would affect perceptions of Koreans, due to that race's lack of exposure in the American media. The two actors discussed "potentially negative feedback" with the producers early in the series' development, and Yunjin Kim's concern led co-creator J. J. Abrams to ensure her character's story would be told.

Supervising producer Javier Grillo-Marxuach, who wrote "House of the Rising Sun", found it difficult to write the Jin-Sun storyline, as he did not speak Korean and had to get into a "cultural headspace" for which he had no personal reference. Showrunner Damon Lindelof commented that given the script was written in English, it was only during the dailies that the producers realized that almost all of the episode would be subtitled, making them worry about ABC's reaction. Instead the network executives received it well, only being concerned about "the complex inherent racial dynamics in the story where a Korean man was attacking a black man". From Dae Kim's perspective, Jin crashed on the island only to find himself in a "worst-case scenario" – he is "among a bunch of strangers, he doesn't speak any English, and he's suspicious of people already." Kim thought it was important to convey Sun and Jin's first falling in love before showing their alienation from each other.

Grillo-Marxuach stressed the importance of the episode due to the discovery of the caves, which prompts the survivors to become "full-time dwellers of the island." Referring to the episode's Jin-Sun and Locke-Charlie storylines, Grillo-Marxuach felt that the island was about being "forced to confront your inner demons [and] work out things" never addressed before. Charlie's fear of bees is based on Grillo-Marxuach's life experience. Despite the character's phobia, Monaghan enjoyed working with the bees. The ones used in the episode were male drones, which meant they lacked stingers and were docile enough to easily handle. Monaghan's head and arms were covered in sticky honey to encourage the bees to land and stay on him during filming. To simulate Jack and Kate's escape from the bees, the special effects team created "CG bees" and then added them in post-production. Michael Zinberg directed and Sora Jung guest starred.

== Reception ==
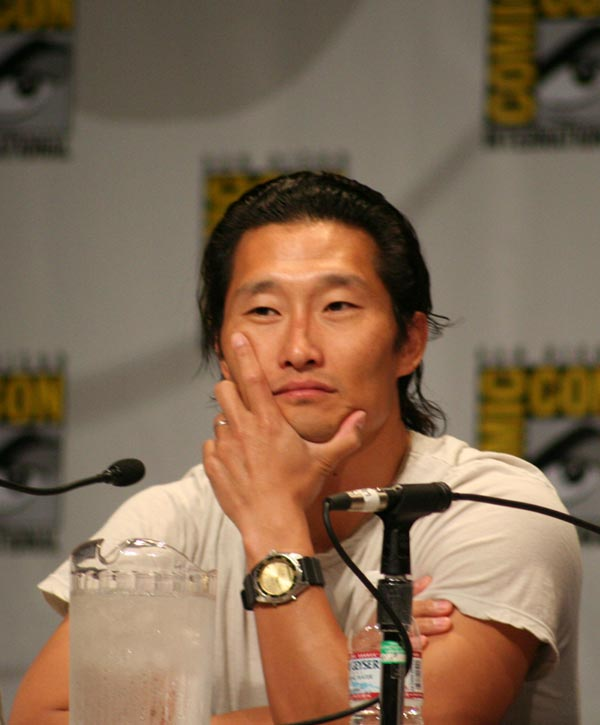
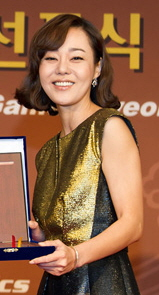
"House of the Rising Sun" was the first episode centered around Jin and Sun (as portrayed by Daniel Dae Kim and Yunjin Kim)

"House of the Rising Sun" first aired in the United States on October 27, 2004. An estimated 16.83 million U.S. viewers watched the episode's premiere, and it earned a ratings share of 6.4/17, a slight increase from the previous episode. "House of the Rising Sun" finished in thirteenth place for the week among all the major networks.

The episode has received mostly positive reviews. In her 2006 work Finding Lost: The Unofficial Guide, Nikki Stafford called it "an excellent episode, with a beautiful, mournful musical score." Robert Dougherty, author of the 2008 book Lost Episode Guide for Others: An Unofficial Anthology, deemed the "smaller, character driven" episode a "must see". He cited its showcase of Yunjin Kim and the revelations surrounding Jin and Sun's relationship, though Dougherty admitted some viewers might have found these minor characters uninteresting.

In 2008, Dan Snierson of Entertainment Weekly graded the episode with an A−. He described the main Jin-Sun storyline as "delicate and gripping," and believed Sun's eventual decision to stay with her husband was as "intriguing" as the revelation that she could speak English. Snierson also praised the episode's humor and tension between the castaways' "we're-gonna-be-rescued-any-minute- versus-we're-gonna-be-here-for-awhile" mentalities.

Chris Carabott, writing for IGN in 2008, rated "House of the Rising Sun" with an 8 out of 10 – an indication of a "great" episode. He felt that Jin's situation deserved sympathy and was good fodder for future storylines, and also was pleased that the language barrier was somewhat resolved so early in the series with Sun's ability to speak English. On a list ranking all the Lost episodes (except the finale), the Los Angeles Times ranked "House of the Rising Sun" 44 out of 110 episodes, explaining: "Cutesy title aside, this first look into the Sun and Jin marriage proved the show was willing to try all kinds of different stories to be a success." "House of the Rising Sun", along with "Pilot" and "The Moth", won a Prism Award for Charlie's drug storyline.
