= The Moth (Lost) =

- Lost episode
- Locke shows Charlie a moth cocoon, explaining its importance to the survival of the moth, and hinting at its similarity to Charlie's struggle with his heroin addiction
- Episode no.: Season 1 Episode 7
- Directed by: Jack Bender
- Written by: Jennifer Johnson; Paul Dini
- Production code: 105
- Original air date: November 3, 2004
- Running time: 43 minutes

Guest appearances
- Neil Hopkins as Liam Pace; Christian Bowman as Steve Jenkins; Dustin Watchman as Scott Jackson; Glenn Cannon as Priest; Richard MacPherson as Recording executive

Episode chronology
← Previous "House of the Rising Sun"	Next → "Confidence Man"
- Lost season 1

"The Moth" is the seventh episode of the first season of Lost. The episode was directed by Jack Bender and written by Jennifer Johnson and Paul Dini. It first aired on November 3, 2004, on ABC. The character of Charlie Pace (Dominic Monaghan) is featured in the episode's flashbacks.

Charlie begins experiencing the effects of heroin withdrawal, while Jack becomes trapped in a cave. Meanwhile, Sayid Jarrah (Naveen Andrews), Kate Austen (Evangeline Lilly) and Boone Carlyle (Ian Somerhalder) attempt to triangulate the signal of the French woman's broadcast. Charlie's involvement in his band Drive Shaft is featured in the episode's flashbacks.

"The Moth" was watched by 18.73 million people live, almost two million more than the previous episode. This episode marks the first time "You All Everybody" by Drive Shaft was sung in its entirety, as it had not been written yet in previous episodes. The episode received mixed-to-positive reviews, with some reviewers commenting that the episode was not of the same caliber as previous episodes.

== Plot ==
=== Flashbacks ===
Charlie (Dominic Monaghan) tells a priest that he is going to quit his band because it has a bad influence on him. Soon after, his brother, Liam Pace (Neil Hopkins), tells Charlie that Drive Shaft has gotten a recording contract. Charlie doesn't want to sign the contract because he has qualms about the sex and drugs the band engages in. Liam talks him into signing, promising that Charlie can quit any time he's had enough. One evening at a show, Liam, to Charlie's frustration, starts singing the chorus to "You All Everybody", which is supposed to be sung by Charlie. Liam assures Charlie it won't happen again.

Later, Charlie finds Liam high on heroin with groupies. Charlie kicks the groupies out, and tells Liam that he's done with the band. Liam says to Charlie that he, Liam, is Drive Shaft, and that nobody knows who the bass player (Charlie) is. He goes on to tell Charlie that without the band, Charlie is nothing, which spurs Charlie to use heroin for the first time. Years later, Charlie visits Liam (who has turned his life around) at his house in Australia and wants Liam to rejoin Drive Shaft for a comeback tour. Liam declines as being in the band almost ruined his life (he missed the birth of his daughter), but Charlie says that the band can't do the tour without him. Liam criticizes Charlie for still using drugs, and Charlie blames Liam for getting him started with drugs in the first place. Liam asks Charlie to stay with him for a few weeks, saying that Sydney has some good rehab programs and that he can get Charlie help. Charlie angrily leaves, saying he has a plane to catch.

=== On the Island ===
It is Day 8, September 29, 2004, and Charlie is suffering from heroin withdrawal since he voluntarily gave his heroin to John Locke (Terry O'Quinn) in the previous episode. After finding him, Charlie asks Locke for the heroin back, and Locke says that he'll give Charlie the drugs the third time he asks, because he wants Charlie to have the choice to quit.

Sayid Jarrah (Naveen Andrews), Kate Austen (Evangeline Lilly) and Boone Carlyle (Ian Somerhalder) attempt to find where the French transmission is coming from, so they make a plan to turn on antennas at different points on the island in an attempt to triangulate the signal. At the caves, Charlie searches through Jack Shephard's (Matthew Fox) medicine supply for something to ease his heroin withdrawal. When Jack catches him with diazepam, Charlie claims he has a headache and was looking for aspirin.

When Jack upsets Charlie by telling him to move his guitar, Charlie angrily shouts at him, causing the entrance of the cave they are in to collapse. Charlie manages to escape, but Jack is trapped inside. Using his construction experience, Michael Dawson (Harold Perrineau) leads the rescue attempt with Steve Jenkins (Christian Bowman) and Scott Jackson (Dustin Watchman). In the jungle, James "Sawyer" Ford (Josh Holloway) goes to tell Kate (who is traveling to set up her antenna for the triangulation attempt) about Jack's predicament, but decides against it because he doesn't like Kate's hostile attitude. Charlie tells Locke about Jack's situation, but reveals the real reason for his going to Locke is to ask for his drugs a second time. Locke shows Charlie a moth cocoon, and explains that he could help the moth by slitting the cocoon and letting the moth free, but it would not survive because it would be too weak. Instead, the moth needs to struggle to break free. Nature and struggle make people stronger, Locke says, indicating to Charlie that he needs to fight through his suffering.

Kate and Sawyer stay at the second triangulation point, while Sayid goes to the third. After learning of Jack's situation from Sawyer, Kate goes to help, leaving the job of turning on the signal to Sawyer. Charlie squeezes through an opening at the cave and finds Jack, but while doing so, the opening collapses and traps Charlie and Jack inside. Charlie hesitantly pops Jack's shoulder back into place at Jack's request. Jack correctly guesses that Charlie is suffering from withdrawal, and Charlie assures Jack he's okay. Kate desperately tries to dig them out along with the other castaways, while the two worry about losing oxygen. Charlie sees a moth which leads him to an opening and the pair dig out of the cave.

Sayid sets off his bottle rocket to signal the antenna power up process. Shannon Rutherford (Maggie Grace) sets off Boone's rocket from the beach, as Boone had gone to help rescue Jack, as does Sawyer from his location. Sayid turns on the transceiver, but before he is able to triangulate the signal, an unseen person knocks Sayid unconscious with a stick.

Later Hurley brings Jack and Charlie water, he notes Charlie doesn't look well but Jack covers for him saying that he has the flu. Hurley tells him to get better and Charlie looks thankful to Jack. He sees Locke and asks him for his heroin and Locke gives it back. Charlie looks at it for a moment before tossing it into the fire, smiling. Locke tells Charlie he's proud of him and that he always knew he could do it. Charlie and Locke see a moth flying away.

== Production ==
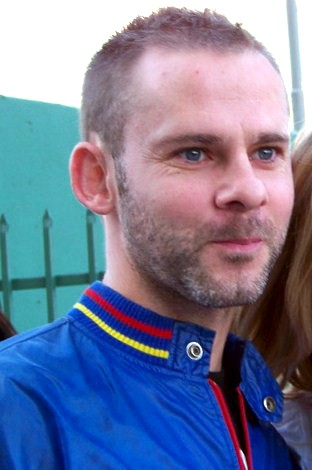
In the pilot episode, Dominic Monaghan did not know what the tune of "You All Everybody" would be, so he had to make up a temporary one

"The Moth" aired on November 3, 2004. The episode was directed by Jack Bender and written by Jennifer Johnson and Paul Dini. The church scene with Charlie and Liam at the church in Manchester was actually filmed on Honolulu, where the scenes on the Island are filmed. Monaghan says that he feels Charlie's black hoodie is a sort of "security blanket" that he hides underneath and uses it when he feels "lost." The "heroin" that Charlie is supposedly snorting is actually brown sugar. Monaghan revealed this in an interview with Stuff magazine in October 2005, saying, "[The heroin is] brown sugar. You get some really sweet boogers. You have to be careful not to snort too much of it, but it's happened a few times. You just find dessert up your nose couple of hours later."

According to Monaghan, Drive Shaft is similar to Oasis, in that "[Charlie's] first album was kind of like Oasis's first album: critically acclaimed, didn't sell big numbers, but in the industry, people gave it respect." J. J. Abrams and Damon Lindelof told Monaghan that if he wanted to write the song that would be Charlie's "one hit wonder", they would consider using it in the show. Monaghan wrote a song called "Photos and Plans" with a friend; Abrams and Lindelof liked the song, but it did not make it into Lost. The lyrics were inspired by an incident on The Phil Donahue Show, where Matt Reeves, who was close friends with producers Bryan Burk and Damon Lindelof, saw a female audience member yell out, "You all everybody, acting like it's the stupid people wearing expensive clothes." The producers had an inside joke where they would say this quotation to each other. According to Burk, "At one point, in a delirious stupor, we realized we had said it so many times that that had to be the song."

In the Pilot, Monaghan's voice when he sang "You All Everybody" was based on "when Prince puts on his female voice", since the song had not been composed yet. For "The Moth" the producers contacted Los Angeles-based singer Jude to write a full version. The song is sung by Chris Seefried, former lead singer of Gods Child and Joe 90.

== Reception ==
"The Moth" first aired in the United States on November 3, 2004. 18.73 million people in America watched the episode live.

The episode received generally mixed-to-positive reviews. Ryan McGee of Zap2it wrote that "this episode wasn't a stinker by any measure, but after the run of early episodes, this is the first that really didn't hold its own when compared to the others", adding that "The moth imagery/metaphor just beats you down by episode's end, making you long for the more subtle writing the show has produced up until this point." The TV Critic gave the episode a 68/100, writing that it falls between being "obvious and cheesy" and "beautifully paced and structured". Myles McNutt of The A.V. Club gave the episode a B, and shared his opinion that it is "one of the more intensely metaphorical—and thus writerly—episodes of the series. The eponymous metaphor—delivered by Locke—is one of the series’ most blatant, and the moth’s consistent reappearance in the episode calls a lot of attention to the construction of the narrative."

IGN staff rated "The Moth" as the 36th best episode in all of Lost, explaining, "The moth of the episode's title appears both as a metaphorical and physical symbol of the struggle to find strength within yourself, as Locke explains to Charlie, and to take charge of your own life without relying on anyone else to do it for you." In a review focusing solely on "The Moth", Chris Carabott of IGN gave the episode a 9/10, writing that the episode "does a great job of utilizing screen time for most the major characters on the show", and that "Locke's analogy of 'The Moth' in comparison to Charlie's situation perfectly encapsulates what many of the characters are going through on the island." In a ranking of all of Lost's episodes, Emily VanDerWerff of the Los Angeles Times placed "The Moth" at number 102, complimenting Monaghan and O'Quinn's acting, but criticizing the storyline for containing "nonsensical drug abuse storytelling." "The Moth", along with "Pilot" and "House of the Rising Sun", won a PRISM Award for Charlie's drug storyline.
