= Confidence Man (Lost) =

- Lost episode
- Sawyer being tortured by Sayid so he can reveal the location of Shannon’s inhalers
- Episode no.: Season 1 Episode 8
- Directed by: Tucker Gates
- Written by: Damon Lindelof
- Production code: 106
- Original air date: November 10, 2004
- Running time: 43 minutes

Guest appearances
- Michael DeLuise as David; Kristin Richardson as Jessica; Billy Mayo as Kilo; Jim Woitas as Boy

Episode chronology
← Previous "The Moth"	Next → "Solitary"
- Lost season 1

"Confidence Man" is the eighth episode of the first season of Lost. The episode was directed by Tucker Gates and written by Damon Lindelof. It first aired on November 10, 2004, on ABC. The character of James "Sawyer" Ford (Josh Holloway) is featured in the episode's flashbacks. Sawyer is accused of stealing Shannon Rutherford's (Maggie Grace) inhaler, and Sayid Jarrah (Naveen Andrews) tortures him in an attempt to find out where it is. In the flashbacks, Sawyer's life before the crash is revealed, showing his scams as a confidence man.

The episode was intended to make Sawyer look like less of a belligerent, as he had generally acted as the antagonist in previous episodes. It also set the stage for the love triangle between Kate, Sawyer, and Jack. The episode was first broadcast in the United States on November 10, 2004, earning 18.44 million viewers. It received mostly positive reviews, although a few reviewers discussed aspects of the episode that they felt did not blend in well with the rest of the episode and series.

== Plot ==
=== Flashbacks ===
Sawyer is in bed with a woman, Jessica (Kristin Richardson). After he declares his love for her, she realizes he is late for a meeting. As he rushes to leave, his briefcase falls open, revealing thousands of dollars in cash he claims she was not supposed to have seen. Sawyer then informs her that he is meeting someone to get money for an investment that will triple his cash in two weeks, and Jessica tells him that she will get additional money from her husband, David (Michael DeLuise), so that she and Sawyer can split the profit. Later, Sawyer is revealed to be a con artist in debt with a loan shark, Kilo (Billy Mayo), who demands his money back, plus fifty percent, by the next day. Sawyer goes to Jessica's house to finalize the deal, but reconsiders upon seeing a small boy (Jim Woitas), their son, emerge from another room. He suddenly calls off the con, drops his briefcase of money, and rushes out of their house.

=== On the island ===
It is Day 9, September 30, 2004. On the beach, Sawyer catches Boone Carlyle (Ian Somerhalder) searching through his stash of items he salvaged from the crash, and Jack Shephard (Matthew Fox) attends to Sayid's head wound. Sayid reports his failure in triangulating the distress signal, and the destruction of the transceiver by his attacker. Shannon brings a bloody Boone to the caves, where he explains to Jack that Sawyer beat him, and that his sister Shannon's asthma has become a problem. Many of the survivors become convinced that Sawyer is hoarding some inhalers from the wreck. Jack unsuccessfully demands the inhalers from Sawyer, and when Kate does the same, Sawyer says he will give up the inhaler if Kate kisses him. Kate calls his bluff and challenges him about the letter he often reads. Sawyer makes Kate read the letter aloud. The letter is addressed to "Mr. Sawyer" and explains that Mr. Sawyer had sex with the letter writer's mother and stole all of the letter writer's father's money, resulting in the father killing his wife and himself.

As Sayid and John Locke (Terry O'Quinn) discuss the attack on Sayid, Locke suggests that Sawyer is the culprit, since he is doing well for himself on the island, hoarding other people's possessions, and also seems to dislike Sayid. Meanwhile, Shannon begins to have trouble breathing due to her lack of medication and panics. Jack tries beating answers out of Sawyer by punching him but stops when he sees others' disapproval. Then with Jack's approval, Sayid ties Sawyer to a tree and tortures him for answers, revealing that he has tortured people before.

Sawyer finally agrees to give up the inhalers, but only to Kate. He again says he will hand over the medication if she kisses him, which she reluctantly does, only to be told by him that he does not have the medication after all. Kate elbows Sawyer, and an enraged Sayid attacks him, stabbing him in the arm and hitting an artery. Jack arrives to stop the bleeding and save Sawyer's life.

Sawyer wakes up the next day, October 1, 2004, with his arm bandaged up, while Kate looks on. She tells Sawyer that she knows the letter was written when Sawyer was a kid, and also works out that the letter wasn't written to Sawyer, but by him. He tells Kate that his real name isn't Sawyer and that the letter was written to the real Sawyer, a con man, who ruined his family. He ended up becoming a con man himself, so he took the name Sawyer as an alias. He snatches the letter from Kate and tells her not to feel sorry for him and to leave.

Despite pleas from Kate, Sayid sets off to explore the island's shoreline in self-imposed isolation, needing time to come to terms with his actions in torturing Sawyer, while Sun-Hwa Kwon (Yunjin Kim) helps Shannon by making a eucalyptus salve to clear her bronchial passages. Charlie Pace (Dominic Monaghan) convinces Claire Littleton (Emilie de Ravin) to move to the caves, because they made a deal that if Charlie found peanut butter, she would move; Charlie shares an imaginary jar of peanut butter with her. Sawyer attempts to burn the letter he wrote, but he finds himself unable to go through with it.

== Production ==
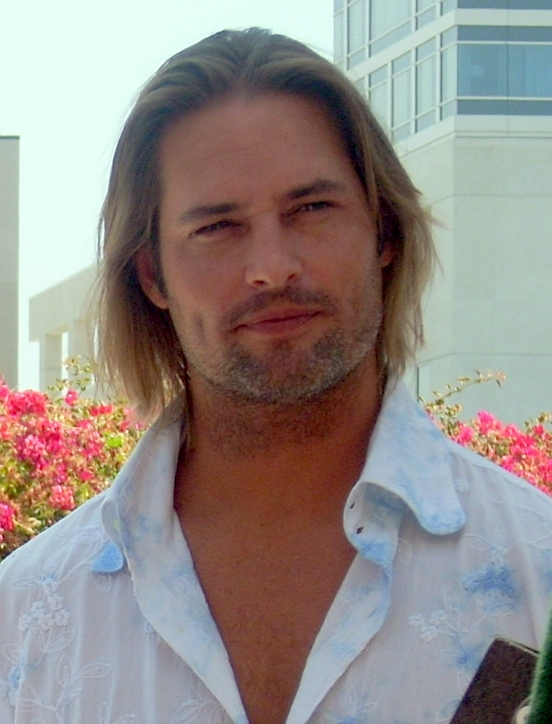
The episode was intended to introduce Sawyer's (played by Josh Holloway) humanity, contrasting his slightly villainous attitude in previous episodes.

The episode was written to humanize Sawyer and set up the love triangle between him, Kate and Jack. Kate was meant to look at Sawyer in a new way, and, according to Lindelof, think, "wow, this guy is not just a belligerent." The episode also shows the moral ambiguity of some characters by revealing more of their personalities, with the ones introduced as protagonists doing things that are generally not viewed as protagonist-like– an example being Jack beating Sawyer and eventually asking Sayid to torture him; and an antagonistic character, Sawyer, proving not to be solely antagonist-like– an example being his backstory and flashback, which show that he is not exclusively evil. Lindelof explained that he wanted Sawyer to "come out of his shell a little, and say to the audience, 'you're supposed to like this guy'", further explaining, "the root of him being an asshole is that these horrible things happened to him when he was a little kid, and he's really really angry."

Sawyer and Jin-Soo Kwon (Daniel Dae Kim) were the least-liked characters by viewers during the first few episodes, because, according to Lindelof, "they were just really obnoxious, bad guys". In later episodes, however, Sawyer and Jin changed to be more likable. Towards the beginning of "Confidence Man", Sawyer is seen reading the novel Watership Down by Richard Adams (this is the book that caused Boone to think that Sawyer took Shannon's inhaler). The novel has numerous similarities to Lost, including "letting go", and building a society. Furthermore, the protagonists of Watership Down are rabbits – a recurring motif in Lost. The episode ends with a montage of various characters performing different activities, featuring the song "I Shall Not Walk Alone", written by Ben Harper and performed by The Blind Boys of Alabama. One lyric from the song is, "I just reach for mother Mary"; Sawyer's mother's name is Mary, and, according to reviewer Therese Odell from the Houston Chronicle, the lyric may be alluding to this. Also, percussionist Ryan McKinnie of The Blind Boys of Alabama said of many members of the group's blindness, "Our disability doesn’t have to be a handicap. It's not about what you can't do. It's about what you do. And what we do is sing good gospel music." This quotation is very similar to the oft-repeated quotation by many characters (especially Locke), "Don't tell me what I can't do."

== Reception ==
"Confidence Man" first aired in the United States on November 10, 2004. 18.44 million people in America watched the episode live, a slight decrease from the previous episode, "The Moth", which garnered 18.73 million viewers. The episode received mixed-to-positive reviews. Chris Carabott of IGN gave the episode an 8.4/10 and called it "a well-written, fascinating character piece that does an excellent job of bringing Sawyer into the spotlight", later praising Josh Holloway's performance, writing that "The success of this episode begins and ends with Josh Holloway. So far, we know that he's good at playing Sawyer: The Tough Guy, but now he has to sell a multilayered fragment of a human being who hates himself for becoming the man who destroyed his family. Holloway succeeds in creating a character that quickly unravels throughout the episode as his terrible secret is revealed." The website later ranked "Confidence Man" the 47th best episode of Lost, praising how it "change[d] your entire perspective of a character" in revealing how Sawyer came to be, which made a starting point for "one of the greatest character arcs not only in Lost, but in all of modern television."

Ryan McGee of Zap2it also had a positive review of the episode, writing that "Confidence Man" was "A taut, tense, character-based episode which excelled on the Island and paid off in the flashback as well." Robin Pierson of The TV Critic gave the episode an 82/100, praising Sawyer's performance, and writing that it was "a very well written story", but criticized the music montage at the end as being a crutch, explaining that "It’s as if the directors can’t think of any other way to finish the show." Myles McNutt of The A.V. Club gave "Confidence Man" a B and wrote that "Sawyer’s flashback is really well done", but adds that "Lost—at least at this point in its run—is not calibrated for one of its characters to torture another one. The episode simply doesn’t do enough to get us to the point where we can understand why this event was necessary, and why cooler heads couldn’t have prevailed." Emily VanDerWerff of The Los Angeles Times ranked the episode as the 83rd best of Lost (excluding the finale), writing the episode is "Not bad, but giving Sawyer a big, epic origin story feels kind of beside the point."
