= Homecoming (Lost) =

- Lost episode
- Charlie holding a gun after shooting Ethan Rom dead following Ethan’s defeat
- Episode no.: Season 1 Episode 15
- Directed by: Kevin Hooks
- Written by: Damon Lindelof
- Cinematography by: Michael Bonvillain
- Editing by: Mary Jo Markey
- Production code: 113
- Original air date: February 9, 2005
- Running time: 41 minutes

Guest appearances
- William Mapother as Ethan Rom; Jim Piddock as Francis Heatherton; Sally Strecker as Lucy Heatherton; Darren Richardson as Tommy; Eric Griffith as Buyer

Episode chronology
← Previous "Special"	Next → "Outlaws"
- Lost season 1

"Homecoming" is the 15th episode of the first season of the American drama television series Lost. It aired on ABC in the United States and on CTV in Canada on February 9, 2005. The episode was written by executive producer Damon Lindelof and directed by Kevin Hooks. The episode sees the return of Claire Littleton (Emilie de Ravin), who escaped after she was kidnapped by Ethan Rom (William Mapother). However, her return meant that all the survivors' lives are in danger, and the team has to figure out a way to stop Ethan. Charlie Pace (Dominic Monaghan) is featured in the episode's flashbacks.

"Homecoming" was seen by nineteen-and-a-half million American viewers, and received mixed to positive reviews, where Charlie's backstory received general praise. Lindelof, however, would later consider it one of his least favorite Lost episodes, as he felt exploring Charlie's drug addiction once again was a wrong move.

== Plot ==
=== Flashback ===
The flashbacks show Charlie (Dominic Monaghan) in the height of his drug addiction. To make money for more heroin, Tommy (Darren Richardson) tells him about Lucy Heatherton (Sally Strecker), whose father is rich. He plans for Charlie to steal something of value from her, and then sell it. Once invited to her house, Charlie has an interest in stealing a cigarette case that had belonged to Winston Churchill. However, he develops feelings for Lucy, and takes a job selling photocopiers so he can become respectable, which Tommy opposes. Eventually, Charlie's withdrawal gets to him and he takes the cigarette case before taking the job. His plan to become respectable backfires as he passes out after throwing up under the lid of the photocopier he is demonstrating, and the prospective clients, who work for one of Lucy's father's companies, find the valuable antique in his jacket. When he goes to see Lucy to explain, she refuses to hear his explanation and tells Charlie that he will never take care of anyone.

=== On the Island ===
On Day 27, October 18, 2004, Locke (Terry O'Quinn) finds Claire (Emilie de Ravin), but after she wakes up, she has no recollection of the crash, nor the other castaways, including Charlie himself. The next day, Ethan (William Mapother) confronts Charlie, and threatens to kill one survivor each day until Claire is brought back to him. Taking the threat seriously, several of the castaways set up security measures and traps around the settlement to avoid Ethan carrying out his threat. The next morning, on Day 29, unfortunately, Ethan manages to slip through from the ocean and kills Scott (Dustin Watchman) during the night. Although hesitant at first, Jack (Matthew Fox) plans on using the guns from the marshal's briefcase to set up a trap to capture Ethan, using Claire as bait. Charlie wishes to join him, but is turned down. Sayid (Naveen Andrews), Kate (Evangeline Lilly), Sawyer (Josh Holloway), Jack and Locke await in ambush for Ethan to show himself and grab Claire. When he arrives, Jack manages to stop and eventually subdue Ethan. However, before they can interrogate him, Charlie takes Jack's gun and shoots Ethan dead. When questioned about why he killed Ethan, Charlie tells Jack that he "deserved to die". In the end, Claire remembers Charlie's imaginary peanut butter, visits him and tells him that she wants to trust him.

== Production ==
In one of the flashback scenes, Lucy tells Charlie that her father is out of town buying a paper company in Slough. This a reference to the British mockumentary television series The Office, of which Lost co-creator J. J. Abrams is a fan, and later director for the American version. William Mapother said that he was frustrated upon learning of his death scene as he looked forward to being in more episodes. The actor later declared he "felt sorry" and had sympathy for Ethan, as "he was unarmed, and Charlie pulled out a gun."

== Reception ==
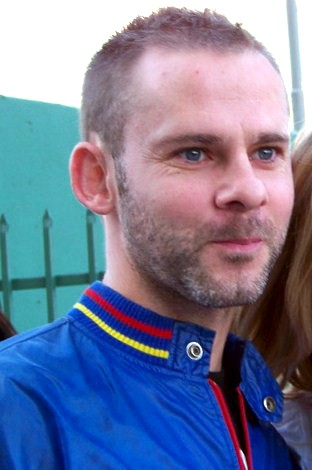
Monaghan's character received general praise for his flashbacks, though one review called it a distraction from the plot

"Homecoming" received a total figure of 19.48 million viewers, and a rating of 7.0 in the United States. This placed Lost number six on the most viewed series for the week. In Canada, the episode was viewed by 1.849 million people, placing Lost the ninth most viewed series in the country. In the United Kingdom, the episode was viewed by 3.33 million people, placing Lost the third most viewed series on Channel 4 for the week.

Reviews of the episode were generally mixed to positive. Chris Carabott of IGN rated the episode an "impressive" 8.2 out of 10. He praised the episode for Charlie's role in it, stating that the backstory was a "straightforward flashback with no hidden message or deeper meaning, it simply does a great job of contrasting the Charlie we now know on the island". Charlie's jealousy, anger and fear of feeling like he is underused in regards to helping Claire develops well into the scene where he kills Ethan. Carabott also stated Ethan's death was to be expected, but didn't want it to happen. IGN ranked Ethan's death as number three in the Top 10 'Lost' deaths, stating that his death was the most frustrating on Lost because Ethan could have provided many answers to the island's mysteries.

Jeff Jensen of Entertainment Weekly was overly critical of the episode, including how the writers wrote Claire to have amnesia during the episode, stating the series could do better with writing the episode, as well as being critical of Jack's success in subduing Ethan, since he lost to fighting Ethan previously on "All the Best Cowboys Have Daddy Issues". Jenson did however, like Charlie's "little anecdote" from his past, and the scene where his plan to be respectable backfired gave Monaghan a chance to demonstrate his gift for light comedy. Mac Slucom of Film Fodder dubbed the episode a "real treat", and though the Lost crew deserves praise for Ethan's capture and death, but described Charlie's flashbacks as a "big time distraction" from the developments on the island.

In 2009, episode writer and show creator Damon Lindelof quoted this episode as one of his least favorite, saying that it "was flawed on almost every single level that an episode of Lost could be". Lindelof would later detail that his frustration owed to the wrong decisions on expanding the Charlie character, given they were again exploring the drug addiction angle.
