= In Translation =

"In Translation" may refer to:

- "...In Translation", an episode of Lost
- "In Translation", an award-winning short story by Lisa Tuttle
