= Pilot (Lost) =

- Lost episodes
- Some of Oceanic Flight 815's wreckage
- Episode nos.: Season 1 Episodes 1 and 2
- Directed by: J. J. Abrams
- Story by: Jeffrey Lieber; J. J. Abrams; Damon Lindelof
- Teleplay by: J. J. Abrams; Damon Lindelof
- Cinematography by: Larry Fong
- Editing by: Mary Jo Markey
- Production code: 100
- Original air dates: September 22, 2004 (Part 1); September 29, 2004 (Part 2)
- Running time: 83 minutes

Guest appearances
- Fredric Lehne as Marshal Mars; Kimberley Joseph as Cindy Chandler; Greg Grunberg as Seth Norris; L. Scott Caldwell as Rose Nadler; Jon Dixon and Michelle Arthur as Flight attendants; Dale Radomski as Tourniquet Man; Benjamin P. Binswanger as Plane Passenger; Christian Bowman as Steve Jenkins; Dane Justman as Survivor; Madison as Vincent the Dog; Frank Torres as Gary Troup; Dustin Watchman as Scott Jackson; Faith Fay as Survivor; Geoff Heise; Barbara Vidinha-Tyler

Episode chronology
← Previous —	Next → "Tabula Rasa"
- Lost season 1

"Pilot" is the two-part television pilot of the ABC television series Lost, with part 1 premiering on September 22, 2004, and part 2 one week later on September 29. Both parts were directed by J. J. Abrams, who co-wrote the script with series co-creator Damon Lindelof. Jeffrey Lieber, who had been commissioned by ABC to write the first version of the script, earned a story credit. Filmed on Oahu, Hawaii, it was the most expensive pilot episode up to that time, costing between $10 and $14 million, largely due to the expense of purchasing, shipping, and dressing a decommissioned Lockheed 1011 to represent Flight 815's wreckage. Many changes were made during the casting process, including the selected actors, the characters' behaviors and fates.

The pilot introduces the survivors of Oceanic Flight 815, who experience a plane crash and end up on a mysterious island. Three of the characters, Jack Shephard (Matthew Fox), Kate Austen (Evangeline Lilly) and Charlie Pace (Dominic Monaghan), are featured before the crash in flashbacks of their experiences on the plane as it breaks apart in mid-air; this narrative technique would be reused in almost every subsequent episode of the series. The Lost pilot is one of the most critically acclaimed television pilots of all time. Both parts earned high ratings, and the episode would later win many awards and accolades.

== Plot ==
=== Part 1 ===
Jack Shephard awakens disoriented in a jungle, and follows a yellow Labrador retriever through the bamboo. He emerges on a beach, confronted by the wreckage of Oceanic Flight 815, a plane he was on that was traveling from Sydney to Los Angeles. A surgeon, Jack administers medical aid to several survivors, assisting the pregnant Claire Littleton and giving CPR to an unconscious Rose Nadler. After the initial shock passes, Jack retreats to a quiet area to tend to his own injuries. He notices Kate Austen and asks her for assistance suturing a wound on his back.

Sayid Jarrah organizes a clean-up group, while Hurley salvages food from the plane's galley and distributes them to survivors. Shannon Rutherford refuses chocolate offered by her stepbrother Boone Carlyle, believing rescue is imminent. A Korean man, Jin-Soo Kwon, tells his wife Sun that she should remain close to him at all times. After night falls, the survivors hear loud roaring noises and crashing trees in the jungle.

The following morning, Jack and Kate set out to retrieve the plane's transceiver from its front section, which landed in the jungle. They are accompanied by Charlie Pace. The trio find it leaning against a tree, forcing them to climb up to reach the cockpit. Charlie disappears into the bathroom while Jack and Kate awaken the concussed pilot. He tells them that the plane lost radio contact six hours after takeoff, whereupon it turned back for Fiji and hit wake turbulence. He estimates that they were a thousand miles off course before the crash, meaning that any rescuers would be looking in the wrong place. He tries using the transceiver, but cannot get a signal.

Suddenly the strange roaring noise is heard again, and the pilot is seized by something outside the plane, prompting the trio to grab the transceiver and flee. During the escape, Charlie falls and Jack returns to help him while a terrified Kate runs on. After the unseen monster leaves, the three reunite and discover the pilot's mangled body suspended in a treetop.

==== Flashbacks ====
On the plane, Charlie runs by Jack while being called after by flight attendants. Turbulence shakes the plane, scaring Rose, who is sitting across from Jack. The two talk, and Rose mentions that her husband is in the bathroom. The turbulence gets worse until the plane starts to veer wildly, causing a man to hit the ceiling and oxygen masks to fall.

=== Part 2 ===
Jack, Kate, and Charlie head back to the beach, where ten-year-old Walt discovers a pair of handcuffs, which he shows to his father, Michael. A man known only as "Sawyer" gets into a fistfight with Sayid, calling him a terrorist, but they're stopped by Jack and Michael. Jack determines that, with no prospects of immediate rescue, he has to try his best to treat the worst-injured survivor, an unconscious U.S. marshal with a piece of wreckage lodged in his side. He enlists Hurley's help.

Sayid repairs the transceiver, but it has little remaining battery life and no signal. He explains that getting to higher ground will make it more likely to get a signal. He and Kate decide to go inland, alongside Charlie, Shannon, Boone, and Sawyer. Along the way, a polar bear emerges and charges the group. Sawyer shoots and kills it with a gun he took off the marshal, and Sayid accuses him of being the marshal's prisoner. Kate seizes the gun before the situation can escalate. Back at the beach, the marshal awakens and asks Jack, "Where is she?"

As the inland team reaches higher ground, Sayid turns on the transceiver and gets a signal. However, it is being blocked by a looping transmission in French, which Shannon translates as "I'm alone now, on the island alone. Please someone come. The others... they're dead. It killed them. It killed them all." Since the transmission lasts 30 seconds and each iteration states the number of repeats thus far, Sayid calculates that it has been broadcasting for over 16 years.

==== Flashbacks ====
Anxious and under suspicion from the flight attendants, Charlie speedwalks by Jack to the bathroom, where he locks himself in to snort heroin. As the turbulence hits, Charlie is slammed against the ceiling and he rushes out, strapping himself into a seat as the plane starts to go down.

Kate is revealed to be the marshal's prisoner, wearing the handcuffs Walt found in the jungle. As the turbulence hits, the luggage compartment is shaken open and the marshal is knocked unconscious by a falling suitcase. Kate struggles to put on her oxygen mask due to the handcuffs, so she frees herself using the marshal's keys and puts his oxygen mask on him before attaching her own. The tail section of the plane breaks off and falls away.

== Production ==
=== Conception and writing ===
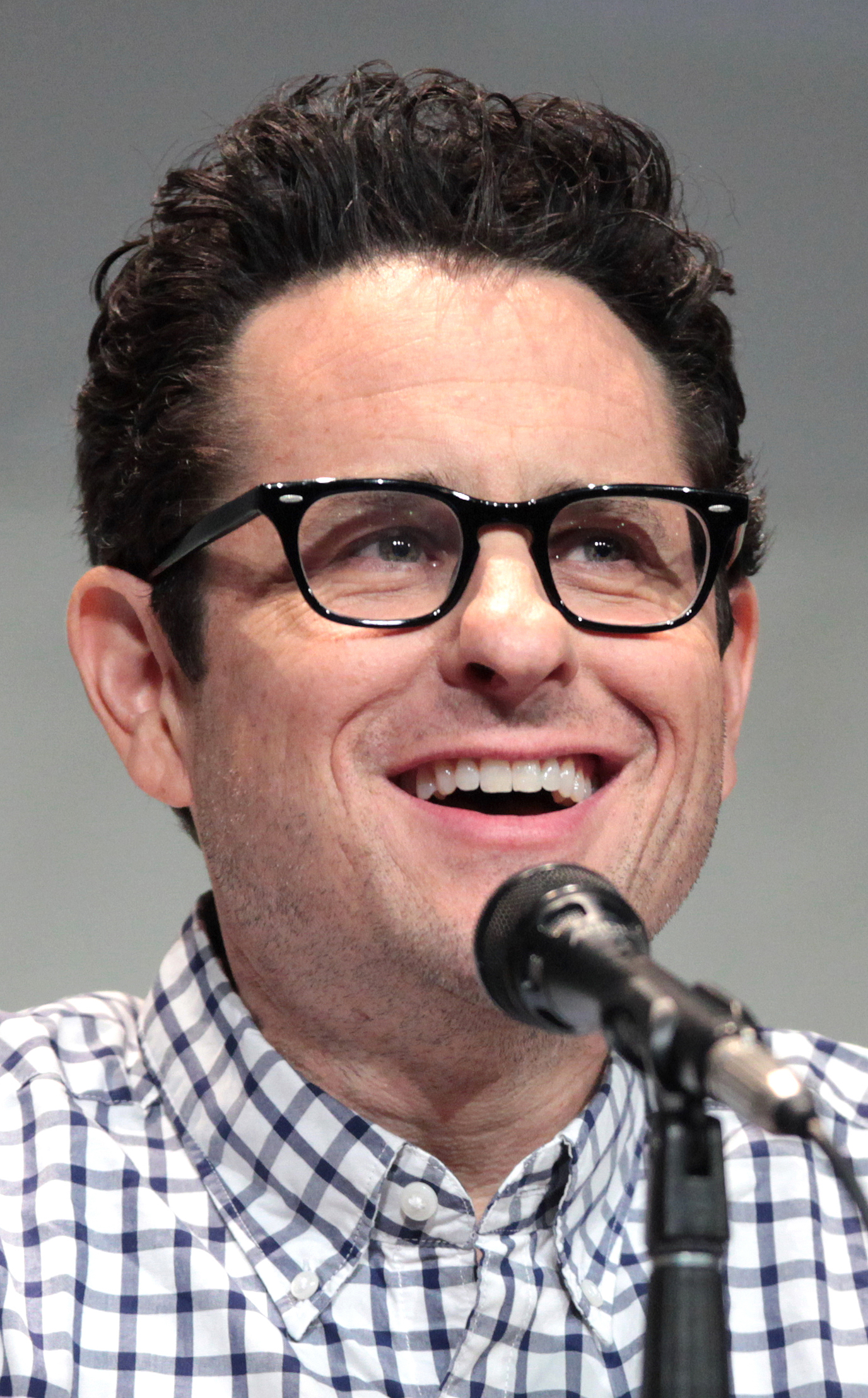
J. J. Abrams directed the episode.

The series began development in the summer of 2003, when ABC senior vice president Thom Sherman decided to order from Spelling Television a script based on an idea of network president Lloyd Braun, who envisioned a series that was a cross between the novel Lord of the Flies, the movie Cast Away, the television series Gilligan's Island and the popular reality show Survivor. Braun had titled his concept Lost after a failed reality show that had broadcast in 2001. Writer Jeffrey Lieber was contacted by Spelling's vice president of series development Ted Gold, and in September 2003 pitched to ABC the concepts for what he called Nowhere. Sherman approved the idea and hired Lieber to write a script, but Braun wound up rejecting Lieber's draft and subsequent rewrites. In January 2004 Braun contacted J. J. Abrams, who developed the TV series Alias for ABC, to write a new pilot script, which would retain the title Lost. Although initially hesitant, Abrams warmed up to the idea on the condition that the series would have a supernatural angle to it and he was assigned a writing partner. ABC executive Heather Kadin sent him Damon Lindelof, who had long intended to meet Abrams as he wished to write for Alias. Together, Abrams and Lindelof developed the characters and plot of Lost, along with creating a series "bible" which would store the major mythological ideas and plot points for an ideal five to six season run for the show. Lindelof and Abrams worked between January 13 and 16, when Lindelof sent a 21–page outline to ABC's executives. A complete first draft of the pilot script was delivered on February 24, and the teleplay kept on being revised, with the final script arriving on April 19. The development of the show was constrained by tight deadlines, as it had been commissioned late in the 2004 season's development cycle and Braun estimated that the whole process from writing to post-production took 6 to 8 weeks. Despite the short schedule, the creative team remained flexible enough to modify or create characters to fit actors they wished to cast.

Though Abrams and Lindelof did not use Lieber's work as inspiration for their own, Lieber's request for arbitration at the Writers Guild of America pointing out the similarities in both scripts earned him a story credit. Lieber would later say the series would drift much from his concepts in Nowhere, declaring Lost was "more like Lord of the Rings than Lord of the Flies". Writer-producer Anthony Spinner later sued ABC on the accounts that he submitted a script titled "L.O.S.T." to the network in 1977, but the case was dismissed on the accounts that none of the people involved with Lost had read Spinner's work.

=== Casting ===
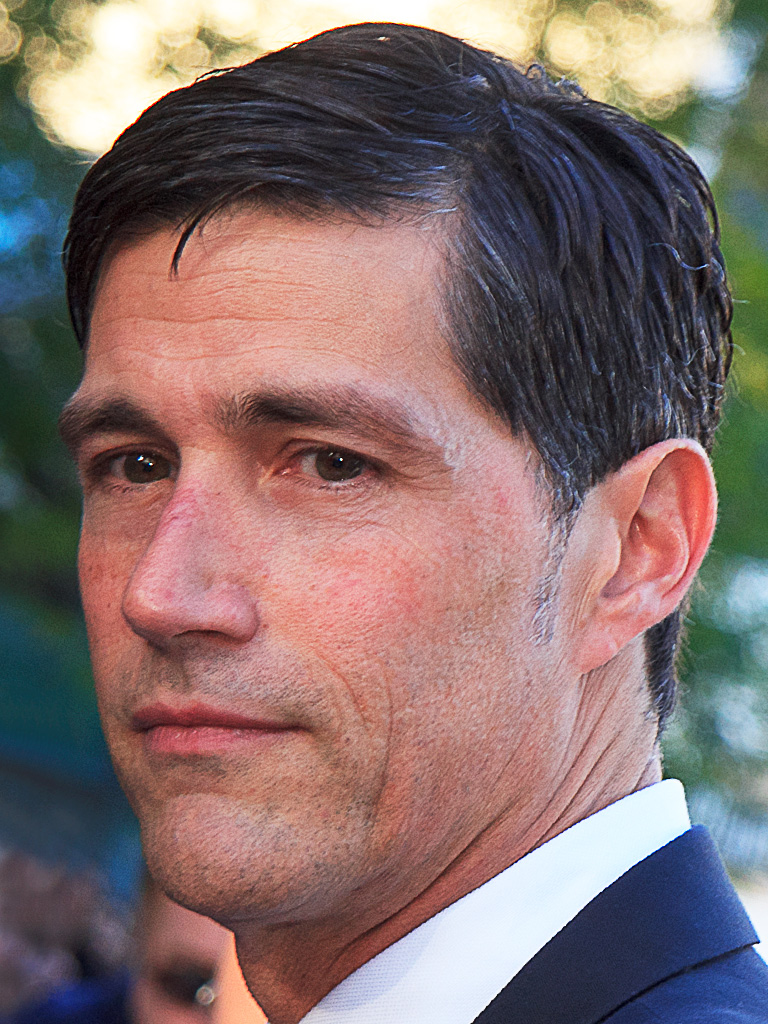
Matthew Fox portrayed Jack Shephard, a doctor who is the main protagonist of the series.

In the initial plans for the series, Jack Shephard was going to die midway through the first episode. The role of Jack was originally offered to Michael Keaton, but when the producers quickly changed their minds about Jack's death, making him the leader, Keaton gave up the job. After Matthew Fox's casting as Jack, the character was established as a leader, and the airplane pilot was introduced to take Jack's place as The Monster's first victim. The pilot wound up being played by Greg Grunberg, a childhood friend of Abrams who the producer brings into most of his projects. Around seventy-five women of different shapes, sizes, ethnicities and ages auditioned to be Kate. In the initial plans, Kate would emerge as the leader after Jack died. She was not going to be a fugitive, instead her husband was going to go to the bathroom shortly before the plane split in mid air, and she would remain adamant on the Island that he was alive. This ended up being used for Rose's (L. Scott Caldwell) character instead. The producers were impressed with Canadian Evangeline Lilly's audition for Kate, as she displayed the confidence with vulnerability that they were looking for. Lilly had difficulty obtaining a visa to work in America. She was supposed to start on the first day of filming, but the schedule was rearranged to give her more time, and in the meantime, the producers began auditioning again in case the visa did not come through. However, during one of the auditions, they got an email confirming that she had obtained her visa and could start work on the show.

Matthew Fox, Dominic Monaghan and Jorge Garcia originally auditioned for the role of Sawyer, who at the time was supposed to be a suit-wearing city con man, but the role was given to Josh Holloway. Garcia was the first actor the producers knew they were going to cast. While the producers thought Garcia was spectacular, they did not think he fit in the role of Sawyer, so they created the Hurley character for him instead. When Holloway auditioned for Sawyer, the producers liked his southern accent and the edge he brought to the character (Holloway reportedly forgot his lines and kicked a chair in frustration). The producers knew he did not suit the role, but thought he was very watchable, so they rewrote the role to suit him, making him more feral, Southern, but kept the same intelligence he originally had. After appearing in The Lord of the Rings, Dominic Monaghan was offered many fantasy-based roles, like elves and pixies. He was keen to portray a different role, so he wanted a contemporary part that had layers and an edge. Originally Charlie was an older rocker that has been a big hit in the 1980s but now had a heroin addiction. After the producers enjoyed Monaghan's audition of Sawyer, they decided to cast him as Charlie and rewrote the script to make Charlie a young has-been instead.

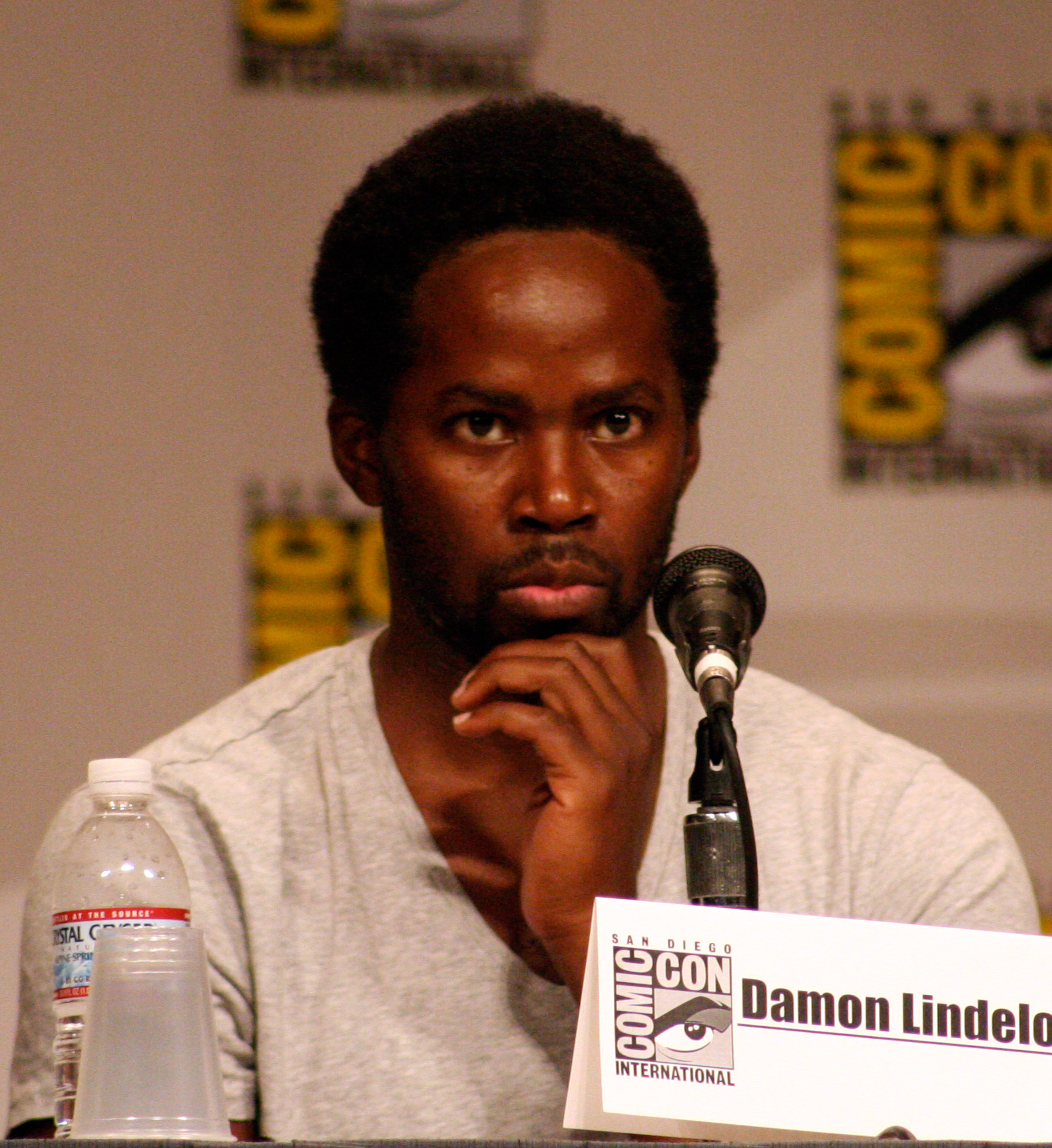
Harold Perrineau plays Michael Dawson, a father.

When the producers were auditioning actors for roles in Lost, Harold Perrineau was in the area. The producers called it a "natural move" to have him audition. Although initially skeptical about the show, he took the role when Lost creator J. J. Abrams explained more about it. A lot of children were seen for the role of Walt. They were narrowed down to the top three, with Malcolm David Kelley winning it, after the producers were impressed with his role in Antwone Fisher. Abrams had worked with Terry O'Quinn previously on Alias, and was keen to work with him again. He explained to O'Quinn that although the role of John Locke in the first episodes would be fairly small, the character will develop afterwards. O'Quinn took the role as he trusted Abrams. He was also the only actor who did not have to officially audition for a part of a main character. The producers were looking for someone who had a "Paris Hilton quality" to play Shannon, but she could not just be shallow, as the storyline would require more than that. A lot of women were auditioned before the producers finally settled on Maggie Grace. She was written to be an antipathetic character in the first season as the producers needed a character they could use to create opposition and conflict. Unlike many other characters of the first season, who were rewritten based on their actors, Boone was largely the same through production. He was originally going to be named Boone Anthony Markham V, going by the nickname, "Five". Ian Somerhalder was cast in the role, but he did not want to shoot a pilot; however, he jumped at the opportunity once he found out he would be working with Abrams.

Lost was planned to be a multi-cultural show with an international cast. The producers thought it was essential that an Australian was cast for the part of Claire, and the Oceanic 815 was leaving from Sydney. Emilie de Ravin was working in Edmonton, so was unable to go to the auditions, which were being held in Los Angeles. From a video she sent to the producers, they were able to tell that de Ravin had the youth and sweetness required for the role, but also looked as though she had some life experience. Sayid was not in the original draft of the pilot episode, but executive consultant Jeff Pinkner had worked with Naveen Andrews on a short-lived ABC series called The Beast, and was keen to have him on Lost. The producers were surprised that Andrews was interested in the role. When they cast him, all Andrews was told was that Sayid was from Iraq and had been in the army. Yunjin Kim originally auditioned for Kate. At her audition she told the producers that she spoke fluent Korean, having been raised in South Korea, where she had starred in several films. The producers were impressed with Kim's performance and wrote her the character of Sun, who was planned to be someone who could not speak English, but after examining her relationship with her husband, the audience would learn that she does in fact speak it. Daniel Dae Kim was cast in the role of Jin, Sun's husband. Dae Kim described his audition as a "really interesting experience". He found it especially hard as it was his first time acting in Korean, and he had not spoken in it regularly since being in high school, when he would talk to his parents.

=== Filming ===
Filming began on March 11, 2004, with soundstage shooting in Los Angeles for the scenes set inside the flight. The primary location was the Hawaiian island of Oahu. The wreckage of Flight 815 was made with a Lockheed L-1011 built in 1972 and previously used by Delta Air Lines until 1998, that after being purchased by ABC was broken up and sent to Hawaii by ship. which at an estimated $10 to $14 million was the most expensive pilot episode up to that time. Filming wrapped on April 24, Lindelof's birthday.

== Reception ==
The pilot episode's world premiere was on July 24, 2004, at San Diego Comic-Con. Part 1 had its first ABC broadcast on September 22, 2004, and was seen by 18.6 million viewers, the best for an ABC drama pilot since Murder One in 1995. The following week, part 2 scored 10.5/17 on the Nielsen ratings, watched by 17 million viewers. Both parts aired on the same night for its first UK broadcast on Channel 4, August 10, 2005, and it became an instant hit. It was the second most watched programme for Channel 4 for that week, with ratings of 6.75 million, second only to Big Brother.

Reviews were favorable upon release. IGN gave it a 10/10 score declaring that Lost "delivers on every promise it makes to its audience." In IGN's 2008 series of "Flashback Reviews", IGN's Chris Carabott changed the scores; he gave part 1 a 9.5/10, saying that the show's mysteries "would keep many of us captivated for the next four years"; he gave part 2 a 9/10, saying that "It really is a roller coaster of emotion and that sense of dread that sets in here is brilliantly portrayed." Entertainment Weekly gave an 'A', stating that even non-science fiction and fantasy fans can like it, and USA Today gave it 4 stars praising the cast. The Futon Critic later chose the pilot as the fifth best TV episode of 2004. TV Guide ranked the episode fifth on a list of the top 100 television episodes of all time. For its 65th anniversary, TV Guide picked it as the second best episode of the 21st century.

At the 2005 Emmy Awards, Lost won a Primetime Emmy Award for Outstanding Drama Series. J. J. Abrams won an Emmy for Outstanding Directing for a Drama Series for the pilot, with Mary Jo Markey winning Outstanding Single-Camera Picture Editing for a Drama Series and Michael Giacchino winning Outstanding Music Composition for a Series (Dramatic Underscore). The show in general won Outstanding Special Visual Effects for a Series and Outstanding Casting for a Drama Series, while receiving additional nominations for Outstanding Sound Editing for a Series and Outstanding Writing for Drama Series. Casting director April Webster won an Artios Award for her work in the pilot. The first part of the pilot also won two Golden Reel Awards for Best Sound Editing in Television Short Form: Sound Effects & Foley and Dialogue & ADR, and a VES Award for visual effects. The episode was nominated for a Hugo Award and awards from the American Society of Cinematographers, Art Directors Guild and Directors Guild of America. "Pilot", along with "House of the Rising Sun" and "The Moth", won a Prism Award for Charlie's drug storyline.
