= Tripping Forward =

- Directed by: Marcus Nash
- Written by: Chris Fogleman; Marcus Nash
- Produced by: J. Bolaji Akran; Bobby C. King; Lu Ugaz
- Starring: Chris Fogleman; William Gregory Lee; Amber Benson
- Cinematography: Patrick Michael Dolan
- Edited by: Mark Hosack; Joel Viertel
- Music by: Danny Manor; H. Scott Salinas
- Production companies: Island Gateway Films; Mania Films
- Distributed by: Panorama Entertainment
- Release dates: April 26, 2009 (FBIFF); January 6, 2010 (United States)
- Running time: 90 minutes
- Country: United States
- Language: English
- Budget: $750,000

Tripping Forward is a 2009 American comedy film directed by Marcus Nash, who co-wrote the screenplay with Chris Fogleman. It stars Fogleman, William Gregory Lee and Amber Benson, and features Ed Begley, Jr., Angela Kinsey and actress/model Sung Hi-Lee.

== Plot ==
Ford Coleman is a young actor trying to start his career in Los Angeles. His friend Tripp has already given up making it in the music business, and now takes drugs and lives off Ford. When Ford's money runs out, Tripp comes up with the idea of selling drugs to supermodels to make money, and Ford goes along so they won't be evicted, and he can keep taking acting classes from James Comey with the girl of his dreams, Gwen.

== Cast ==
- Chris Fogleman as Ford Coleman
- William Gregory Lee as Tripp
- Amber Benson as Gwen
- John Kapelos as Vladdy
- Ed Begley Jr. as James Comey
- Billy Morrison as Sweaty Steve
- Angela Kinsey as Jennifer
- M. C. Gainey as Jim Rose, interviewer
- Sung Hi Lee as Crystal
- Ezra Buzzington as Joe, casting director.

== Production and release ==
Tripping Forward film was shot on a budget of roughly $750,000. It received its initial release at the Palm Beach International Film Festival on April 26, 2009 and was released on DVD on January 26, 2010.
