= Numbers (Lost) =

- Lost episode
- Hugo looking over to see his grandfather succumbing to a fatal heart attack in front of him while Hugo is being interviewed after winning the lottery
- Episode no.: Season 1 Episode 18
- Directed by: Dan Attias
- Written by: David Fury; Brent Fletcher
- Production code: 116
- Original air date: March 2, 2005
- Running time: 43 minutes

Guest appearances
- Mira Furlan as Danielle Rousseau; Lillian Hurst as Carmen Reyes; Jayne Taini as Martha Toomey; Ron Marasco as Ken Halperin; Ron Bottitta as Leonard Simms; Dann Seki as Dr. Curtis; Michael Adamschick as Lottery official; Archie Ahuna as Tito Reyes; Derrick Bulatao as Diego Reyes; Joy Minaai as Reporter; Brittany Perrineau as Mary Jo; Maya Pruett as Nurse

Episode chronology
← Previous "...In Translation"	Next → "Deus Ex Machina"
- Lost season 1

"Numbers" is the 18th episode of the first season of Lost. The episode was directed by Dan Attias and written by Brent Fletcher and David Fury. It first aired on March 2, 2005, on ABC. The character of Hugo "Hurley" Reyes (Jorge Garcia) is featured in the episode's flashbacks.

== Plot ==
=== Flashbacks ===
In September 2004, Hurley wins the lottery, and over the ensuing weeks, everyone around him seems to suffer increasingly bad luck. His grandfather dies of a heart attack, the priest officiating the burial is struck by lightning, his brother's wife walks out on him, his mother breaks her ankle while the house he bought her goes up in flames, and Hurley himself is falsely arrested. He then visits an asylum where he'd resided for a time to talk to a patient there, Leonard Simms, who continually mutters the numbers Hurley used to win the lottery. When Hurley tells him about this, Lenny turns lucid, panics, and shouts that "The numbers are bad!" As the hospital staff drag him away, Leonard tells Hurley to find Sam Toomey in Kalgoorlie, Australia.

Hurley travels to Kalgoorlie and learns that Toomey died four years before. His widow Martha explains how Toomey and Leonard served together in the U.S. Navy, stationed at a listening post in the Pacific where they monitored longwave radio transmissions. Most of what they heard was static, but at one point in 1988 (which coincides with the time Rousseau was stranded on the island), they picked up a signal of a human voice repeating the numbers over and over. After using the numbers to win a guessing jar game at a fair, Toomey experienced a steady stream of bad luck until he finally committed suicide by shotgun. Despite this, Martha asserts that there is no curse, and that "You make your own luck."

=== On the Island ===
Looking at some of the documents Sayid found in Rousseau's camp, Hurley notices repeated notations of "4, 8, 15, 16, 23, 42," the same numbers he used to win the lottery. Agitated by this, Hurley sets off on his own to find Rousseau, ignoring Sayid's warnings. The next day, Hurley finds the same mysterious cable Sayid had followed, which extends from the ocean up into the hills and then disappears into the underground near a ravine with a rope bridge across it. Rousseau has since set traps alongside the cable, but through apparent good luck, Hurley keeps avoiding getting hurt. Sayid, Jack, and Charlie eventually catch up with him. The group come to the bridge, which Hurley crosses first, since he's the heaviest. It then collapses under Charlie's much lighter weight, and the group is separated.

Jack and Sayid arrive at Rousseau's old shelter, only to set off another trap, causing an explosion which destroys it. Sayid surmises that Rousseau expected him to return. Meanwhile, Hurley and Charlie split up after being shot at, and Hurley encounters Rousseau, who holds him at gunpoint. Hurley refuses to back down, and adamantly insists that she tell him what the numbers mean. Convinced of his sincerity, she lowers her gun, but then says that she does not know. Her party was drawn to the Island by the numbers radio transmission, but their ship was wrecked by submerged rocks. It took them weeks to find the transmission tower, which was near "the Black Rock," but her team became "sick." After the rest of them were gone, Rousseau changed the message to her own distress call. Musing on how the numbers were evidently responsible for bringing both of them to the Island, and that just as they brought bad luck to him, they caused her to lose everything she cared about, Rousseau concludes that they are indeed cursed. Hurley is relieved to have finally found someone who agrees with him, and hugs her.

Hurley makes his way back to Sayid, Jack, and Charlie, giving them a battery from Rousseau, which can be used for Michael's raft. On the beach, Charlie reveals his heroin addiction to Hurley, who in turn reveals how wealthy he actually is, although Charlie thinks this is a joke and storms off. The numbers are then shown to be engraved on the side of the hatch Boone and Locke found.

Meanwhile, Locke asks Claire to help him build something with wood. When he finishes, it turns out it was a cradle for Claire's future baby. Claire is thankful and reveals it was her birthday today.

== Production ==
A reference is made to Curb Your Enthusiasm, as Hurley is mistaken for a drug dealer and arrested. In Curb Your Enthusiasm, Jorge Garcia plays a drug dealer, and his role as the drug dealer got him the role of Hurley in Lost.

== Reception ==
The episode had 18.85 million American viewers. In Chris Carabott of IGN's review of "Numbers", in which Rousseau makes her second appearance, Carabott described Hurley and Rousseau's encounter as "the episode's best moment", as "Hurley finds comfort with someone who we would least expect." Lost co-creator J. J. Abrams commended Furlan for giving the character "heart and soul", and managed to make her "identifiable and complex".

After the episode aired, numerous people used the eponymous figures (4, 8, 15, 16, 23 and 42) as lottery entries. According to the Pittsburgh Tribune-Review, within three days, the numbers were tried over 500 times by local players. Likewise, in the same period, over 200 people in Michigan alone used the sequence for the Mega Millions lottery and by October, thousands had tried them for the multi-state Powerball lottery. The issue came to attention after a Mega Millions drawing for a near-record US$380,000,000 jackpot on January 4, 2011 drew a series of numbers in which the three lowest numbers (4-8-15) and the mega ball (42) matched four of the five numbers. The #42 is also the "Mega Number" in Hurley's "Mega Lotto" ticket. The players who played the combination won $150 each (or $118 in California).

In May 2024, Mega-Sena, the largest lottery in Brazil, drew a series in which five numbers (8, 15, 16, 23 and 42) matched the sequence. A total of 2,967 players won a prize of R$ 1,878.49 each (roughly $360 in May 2024 figures).
