= The Art of War III: Retribution =

- Directed by: Gerry Lively
- Written by: Joe Halpin
- Produced by: Philip B. Goldfine; Dan Lyon; Ari Newman
- Starring: Treach; Warren Derosa; Sung-Hi Lee; Janet Carroll; Leo Lee
- Cinematography: Suki Medencevic
- Edited by: Randy Carter
- Music by: Louis Castle; James Bairian
- Distributed by: Sony Pictures
- Release date: August 24, 2009
- Running time: 88 minutes
- Countries: United States; South Korea
- Language: English

The Art of War III: Retribution is a 2009 American direct-to-video action film directed by Gerry Lively and starring Treach, Warren Derosa, Sung-Hi Lee and Leo Lee. It is the third installment in The Art of War film series. It is the sequel to The Art of War II: Betrayal (2008). The film had a negative critical reception.

== Plot ==
UN operative Neil Shaw is sent to South Korea to stop a potential nuclear threat amidst reunification talks with North Korea. Shaw's team is attacked, resulting in the death of one agent. During the firefight, Shaw encounters Sun Yi, who is with the arms dealers, and takes her into custody. Shaw's superior, Gaines, arrives in South Korea but is intercepted and killed by men working for the arms dealer. They plant evidence to frame Shaw for the murder, making him a fugitive from the FBI and the Triads. Shaw must evade capture, clear his name, and stop the North Korean separatists from acquiring a nuclear bomb.

== Cast ==
- Anthony "Treach" Criss as SAD Agent Neil Shaw
- Warren Derosa as SAD Agent Jason
- Lee Sung Hi as Sun Yi
- Janet Carroll as Secretary General Barnes
- Leo Lee as Kim
- Charles Rahi Chun as Byung Hoon
- Brian Fitzpatrick as Agent Gibs
- Jack Conley as Gaines
- David Basila as Wakeen
- David Frye as Detective Halpin
- John P. Gulino as Harold Zimmer
- Lovake Heyer as Samad
- Brett A. Jones as Bates
- Cathy Shim as Cara Shim
- Toshi Toda as Jung
- J. Anthony Pena as Anderson
- Bach Hoang as Blond Prostitute (uncredited)

== Production ==
The film was produced before The Art of War II: Betrayal, but shelved after Wesley Snipes contacted the producers about returning to the series. Though consideration was initially given to releasing it as a stand-alone film named "Intervention", it was ultimately released as the third The Art of War film.

== Reception ==
=== Critical response ===
The film received a strongly negative critical reaction. DVDtalk called the film "complete garbage", singling out the action sequences and Treach's performance. The Movie Scene had similar criticisms, describing the action as "boringly pedestrian", accusing Treach of having no charisma, and finding Warren Derosa's performance to be annoying. Movieman's Guide described the plot as "frankly nonsensical and just plain stupid", and criticised the poorly-staged gunfights, particularly the film's climax.
