= Chase (2010 TV series) =

American police procedural drama television series

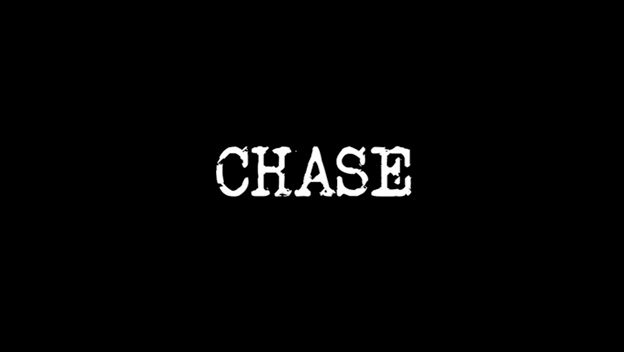
- Genre: Police procedural Drama
- Created by: Jennifer Johnson
- Starring: Kelli Giddish; Cole Hauser; Amaury Nolasco; Rose Rollins; Jesse Metcalfe
- Composer: Trevor Morris
- Country of origin: United States
- Original language: English
- No. of seasons: 1
- No. of episodes: 18

Production
- Executive producers: Jennifer Johnson; Jerry Bruckheimer; Jonathan Littman
- Running time: 42 minutes
- Production companies: Jerry Bruckheimer Television; Bonanza Productions; Warner Bros. Television

Original release
- Network: NBC
- Release: September 20, 2010 – May 21, 2011

Chase is an American police procedural drama television series created by Jennifer Johnson for NBC. The series follows a U.S. Marshals fugitive-apprehension team, based out of Houston, Texas. Jerry Bruckheimer and Johnson serve as executive producers. The series originally aired on Mondays at 10:00 pm ET/9:00 pm CT and premiered on September 20, 2010. After the mid-season break, Chase returned on Wednesdays at 9:00 pm ET/8:00 pm CT. On October 19, 2010, the network ordered a full season consisting of 22 episodes, but this order was cut to 18 in December. On February 3, 2011, the show was put on "a hiatus" with no plan regarding the remaining episodes. On April 6, 2011, NBC announced the remaining five episodes would be broadcast on Saturday nights beginning on April 23 and ended the series on May 21, 2011. Later the show was replaced by Harry's Law.

In the United Kingdom, Chase was re-titled Jerry Bruckheimer's Chase and, as of July 2010, was expected to debut on Living TV in 2011.

== Premise ==
Chase revolves around Kelli Giddish's character, U.S. Deputy Marshal Annie Frost. The other principal cast members, who all portray Marshals, are Cole Hauser as Jimmy Godfrey, Amaury Nolasco as Marco Martinez, Rose Rollins as Daisy Ogbaa, and Jesse Metcalfe as Luke Watson. Siena Goines has a recurring role as Jimmy's girlfriend Natalie.

== Cast ==
=== Main ===
- Kelli Giddish as Annie Nolan Frost
- Cole Hauser as Jimmy Godfrey
- Amaury Nolasco as Marco Martinez
- Rose Rollins as Daisy Ogbaa (episodes 1–16)
- Jesse Metcalfe as Luke Watson

=== Guests ===
- Travis Fimmel as Mason Boyle
- Eddie Cibrian as Ben Crowley
- Siena Goines as Natalie
- Mo Gallini as Hector Torres

== Episodes ==
No.	Title	Directed by	Written by	Original release date	Prod. code	US viewers (millions)
1	"Pilot"	David Nutter	Jennifer Johnson	September 20, 2010	296770	7.31
U.S. Marshal Annie Frost hunts down a cold-blooded criminal responsible for nearly killing an entire family and who is out to reconnect with people from his past. Guest-starring Travis Fimmel.
2	"Repo"	Karen Gaviola	Greg Plageman	September 27, 2010	2J5503	6.33
When the son of a State Trooper is murdered, the team are called upon to track down Eduardo "El Lobo" Lopez (Robert LaSardo); at first the Marshals believe he simply wanted his car back, which had been seized and bought at a recent auction by the State Trooper. When "El Lobo" goes after another man the Marshals realize that he is reclaiming his vehicles that were seized. What they can't figure out is why he is abandoning one vehicle when he reclaims another.
3	"The Comeback Kid"	Dermott Downs	Jerome Schwartz	October 4, 2010	2J5505	5.78
After nearly two decades of living under a false identity as a humble man who councils ex-convicts, Boston mobster Jack Druggan (Robert Knepper) has had enough. He sets out to avenge an assault upon his wife, killing the perpetrators but sparing the lives of all who witness the murders he commits. Druggan goes to great lengths to appear just like his old mug shot, daring the Marshals to catch him.
4	"Paranoia"	Karen Gaviola	Erica L. Anderson	October 11, 2010	2J5506	4.92
Annie and her team chase down delusional fugitive Faith Maples, a mentally disturbed woman who believes her dead daughter is still alive.
5	"Above the Law"	Paul McCrane	Tracy McMillan	October 18, 2010	2J5504	5.18
Annie must outsmart bounty hunter Ben Crowley as she attempts to capture a mega-wealthy swindler with a secret past.
6	"Havoc"	Jeffrey Hunt	Ryan Farley	October 25, 2010	2J5507	4.89
One of the survivors identifies Carson Puckett (Enver Gjokaj) as the bomber of a local coffee shop. Puckett had returned after the explosion to confirm the casualties before authorities arrived. When a second bomb kills three people at a gym, including Puckett's former foreman, the Marshals determine that the next target is Puckett's former employer. Annie is injured in the explosion that was intended to kill Puckett's former employer and must rely on the help of bounty hunter Ben Crowley (Eddie Cibrian) to relay an important message to her team from the hospital about Puckett's motive for the bombings. Daisy is forced to rely on her experience from working on the bomb squad to defuse a bomb on a bus.
7	"The Posse"	Holly Dale	Erik Oleson	November 8, 2010	2J5508	4.55
Annie must deal with a US Marshal impersonator whose vigilantism has dire consequences.
8	"The Longest Night"	Dermott Downs	Scott M. Gimple	November 15, 2010	2J5509	4.57
When a serial killer escapes from prison, Annie must rely on another prisoner for help.
9	"Crazy Love"	Dean White	Dario Scardapane & Tracy McMillan	November 22, 2010	2J5510	5.34
Jackson "Cooper" (Steven Strait) is wanted in numerous states for statutory rape and various other crimes under a variety of aliases. When Jackson manipulates his current underage girlfriend Corina Matthews (Danielle Panabaker) to run away with him against her father's wishes she agrees not knowing that Jackson had to kill her father Alan (David Keith) to keep him from coming after them. Alan had already called the Killeen police and when they find him they call in the Marshals. Annie shares about the death of her own mother to bond with Corina, who continues to post on her blog. When Jackson takes Corina into Mexico, Annie wants to continue the chase and has to be restrained from creating an international incident. Annie gets another message from Corina asking for help and the Marshals make arrangements with the Federales to fund and observe the capture of Jackson for breaking Mexican law in regards to smuggling a minor across international borders.
10	"Under the Radar"	Deran Sarafian	Jennifer Johnson	November 29, 2010	2J5502	6.03
A woman from Calgary who is wanted for the murder of her husband has been hiding in Houston. When it is discovered that she has been robbing banks in Texas the Marshals no longer need to wait for a warrant from Royal Canadian Mounted Police in Calgary.
11	"Betrayed"	Eagle Egilsson	Erik Mountain & Jerome Schwartz	December 6, 2010	2J5511	4.99
Annie must track down Chris Novak (Omari Hardwick), a remorseless cop killer who puts Jimmy's girlfriend Natalie in mortal danger.
12	"Narco (Part 1)"	Dermott Downs	Jennifer Johnson & Shaina Steinberg	January 19, 2011	2J5512	4.35
Annie and her colleagues attempt to track down two women fugitives after they discover the two girls have murdered several people. Annie is involved in a car accident and is kidnapped by a gang of criminals.
13	"Narco (Part 2)"	Holly Dale	Erik Oleson & Jerome Schwartz	January 26, 2011	2J5513	4.17
Luke disagrees with Jimmy and Marco's plan to rescue Annie.
14	"Father Figure"	Eagle Egilsson	Story by : Greg Plageman; Teleplay by : Greg Plageman & Erik Oleson	April 23, 2011	2J5514	3.05
The Marshals go after Justin Tate (Eric Mabius), a police officer who befriends single mothers so as to have access to prey on their daughters. Luke is involved in an internal investigation that could lead to charges brought against his team members.
15	"Seven Years"	Dermott Downs	Jennifer Johnson & Shaina Steinberg	April 30, 2011	2J5515	3.74
An escaped prisoner, David Bottner (Jason Butler Harner), leads Annie and Jimmy through the odd circumstances and events that lead to his conviction, all in an attempt to find the proof of his innocence.
16	"Roundup"	Eagle Egilsson	Erik Oleson & Erik Mountain	May 7, 2011	2J5516	3.62
Annie and Jimmy square off against Luke and Marco in an annual contest to clear as many backlogged warrants as possible.
17	"The Man At The Altar"	Holly Dale	Jeffrey Lieber & Jerome Schwartz	May 14, 2011	2J5517	2.77
The team pursues four fugitives wanted for the murder of a police officer, and Annie is plagued by a recurring dream that involves a wedding and a mysterious figure.
18	"Annie"	Dermott Downs	Andrew Dettmann & Stephanie Sengufta	May 21, 2011	2J5518	3.67
Annie and the team pursue a violent fugitive who is after Annie's father, a shady character himself, and the truth about the past helps Annie and her father reconcile.

== Development and production ==
NBC picked up the script penned by Jennifer Johnson with a put pilot commitment in September 2009. Johnson will serve as an executive producer, along with Jerry Bruckheimer and Jonathan Littman. David Nutter was signed to direct the pilot.

Casting announcements began the second week of February 2010. Rose Rollins was first to be cast, in the role of Daisy Ogbaa, the team's weapon specialist. This was followed quickly by the announcements of the casting of Jesse Metcalfe as Luke Watson, a Marshal from Washington, D.C., and Cole Hauser, as an experienced ex-cop who co-heads the apprehension team. Amaury Nolasco came on board a few days later to portray veteran cop Marco Martinez.

The role of the show's central character, Annie Frost, was offered to actresses Maria Bello, Téa Leoni, and Christina Applegate. The producers were seeking a "strong female lead actress" for the role of Frost. Eventually Kelli Giddish landed the female lead role in late February. The show is primarily set in Houston, Texas episode 2 onward.

The pilot takes place in Houston, Texas and was shot in Dallas and Anna, Texas in March. NBC ordered Chase to series on May 10, 2010. The series will continue to be filmed in the Dallas area.

On December 3, 2010 the episode order for Chase was cut from 22 to 18.

== Broadcast ==
Chase premiered on September 20, 2010. On November 15, 2010 it was announced that Chase would be moving to Wednesdays at 9:00 pm Eastern/8:00 pm Central beginning in January. On February 3, 2011 NBC pulled Chase from its schedule to be replaced with Minute to Win It.

On July 26, 2010, Sky Living secured the rights to air Chase in the United Kingdom. The show will be called Jerry Bruckheimer's Chase and it will be broadcast in the UK, and is expected to start airing in August 2011. Chase was simulcast in Canada on Citytv.

Chase was included in the test broadcast of CHASE on BEAM 31 Philippines, aired every Monday at 10 pm. When the channel ceased its operation on October 19, 2012, the series was carried over by its succeeding station Jack City.

For late night filler on Thursday from January 17, 2013, TVNZ began airing this on New Zealand's TV2.

== Reception ==
=== Critical response ===
Review aggregator Rotten Tomatoes gives the film a 33% "Rotten" score based on 18 reviews, with an average rating of 3.7/10. The website's critics consensus reads, "Chase is a middling crime procedural, with appealing actors playing bland characters and decent action scenes undercut by silly dialogue." On Metacritic, the show holds a weighted average score of 47 out of 100, indicating "mixed or average reviews".

Currently, IMDb rates the film at 6.9/10 based on 7,5000 individual user votes/rating, indicating a decently favourable audience reception. This score is a cumulative result of more than 15 years of user input by way of vote since the TV series was first released in 2010.

Metacritic gives the film a rating score of 47/100 based on 17 professional critic reviews, signifying "mixed" or average reviews.

=== Ratings ===
Season	Episodes	Timeslot	Season premiere	Season finale	TV Season	Ranking	Rating	Viewers (in millions)
1	18	Mondays 10:00 p.m. (September 20, 2010 – December 6, 2010); Wednesdays 9:00 p.m. (January 19, 2011 – January 26, 2011); Saturdays 8:00 pm (April 23, 2011 – May 21, 2011)	September 20, 2010	May 21, 2011	2010–2011	#84	4.1	6.45

== See also ==
- FBI: Most Wanted—an American police procedural drama television series which follows an FBI fugitive-apprehension team
