= ...In Translation =

- Lost episode
- Jack tries to defuse a conflict between Michael and Jin after he accuses Jin of burning a raft that Michael was constructing in an attempt to leave the island
- Episode no.: Season 1 Episode 17
- Directed by: Tucker Gates
- Written by: Javier Grillo-Marxuach; Leonard Dick
- Cinematography by: Michael Bonvillain
- Editing by: Mark J. Goldman
- Production code: 115
- Original air date: February 23, 2005
- Running time: 43 minutes

Guest appearances
- Byron Chung as Mr. Paik; John Shin as Mr. Kwon; Joey Yu as Byung Han; Chil Kong as White suit; John Choi as Butler; Kiya Lee as Mrs. Han; Angelica Perreira as Byung's daughter; Tess Young as Sun's friend

Episode chronology
← Previous "Outlaws"	Next → "Numbers"
- Lost season 1

"...In Translation" is the 17th episode of the first season of the American drama television series Lost. The episode was directed by Tucker Gates and written by Javier Grillo-Marxuach and producer Leonard Dick. It first aired on ABC in the United States on February 23, 2005.

The character of Jin-Soo Kwon (Daniel Dae Kim) is featured in the episode's flashbacks, revealing his disturbing job experience under Mr. Paik (Byron Chung), the father of his wife Sun-Hwa Kwon (Yunjin Kim). In the present, Michael's (Harold Perrineau) unfinished raft catches fire overnight, leading him and Sawyer (Josh Holloway) to blame Jin for the incident. The episode title is a reference to the phrase "lost in translation", where a phrase or idiom loses its meaning when translated between languages.

"...In Translation" was seen by an estimated 19.49 million American household viewers. It received mixed-to-positive reviews from critics, with praise given to the episode developing the characters of Jin and Sun, while the lack of progress in the series' narrative was criticized.

== Plot ==
=== Flashbacks ===
Jin-Soo Kwon (Daniel Dae Kim) visits Sun's (Yunjin Kim) father, Mr. Paik (Byron Chung), to ask for his daughter's hand in marriage. Mr. Paik asks Jin about his dreams and his family. Jin states that he would like to own his own restaurant and hotel, and that his father is deceased, as well as telling Mr. Paik that he would do anything for Sun. Mr. Paik offers Jin a job but is unspecific about its requirements. Later, Jin tells Sun that they will be able to go on their honeymoon after he does some management training.

Jin gets promoted and Mr. Paik assigns him to go to the house of the Secretary for Environmental Safety, Byung Han, to "deliver a message" regarding Mr. Paik's disappointment with Han's decision to close the factory. There, he tells Mr. Han that Mr. Paik is displeased with him. As a way to make Mr. Paik happy, Mr. Han gives Jin a puppy, the same dog seen earlier in Sun's flashbacks. Sun prepares a candlelit dinner for her husband, but they are interrupted by Mr. Paik, who is upset that his factory has been closed. Mr. Paik blames Jin for not delivering the message properly - Jin didn't fully understand that he was being asked to threaten the secretary. Mr. Paik sends Jin, along with a mercenary companion wielding a silenced pistol, back to Mr. Han's house.

To save the man's life, Jin brutally beats up Mr. Han right in front of his wife and young daughter. He tells him that the factory must open tomorrow, and tells the mercenary Mr. Han got the message. He returns home and washes blood from his hands (the same flashback shown from Sun's perspective in the past), but this scene is now followed with Jin crying for what he has been forced to do. Jin visits his father in a fishing village, revealing that Jin lied about his father being dead to Mr. Paik, and begs for forgiveness for being ashamed of him. His father embraces him. They talk about the marital difficulties, and Jin expresses his wish to "start over". After commenting that Mr. Paik's next job for Jin is to go sell watches to his associates in Sydney and Los Angeles, Jin is told by his father to go to America with Sun to start a new life.

=== On the Island ===
On Day 32, October 23, 2004, Sun is wearing a bikini, but Jin rushes to cover her as they argue. Jin becomes forceful during the argument and shoves her into the sand. Michael Dawson (Harold Perrineau) rushes to her aid and threatens Jin. Sun slaps Michael in the face. He stands there shocked as Jin and Sun walk away. As Sun dresses, Jin asks if she is involved with Michael and she says no. Sun apologizes to Michael for slapping him while he is working on the raft. She said that she did it to protect Michael, because he doesn't know what Jin can do, implying her slapping him saved him from a far worse beating.

Shannon Rutherford (Maggie Grace) and Sayid Jarrah (Naveen Andrews) flirt, while Michael works on the raft. Jack Shephard (Matthew Fox) comes over and Michael tells him the raft can only fit four people. Jack asks about the available spots on the raft and Sawyer (Josh Holloway) says that he bought one in exchange for some building materials. At night the raft catches fire and all the islanders, namely Michael and Sawyer, angrily blame Jin. Sun then finds Jin covered with burns and he does not speak to her.

Sayid informs Shannon's stepbrother, Boone Carlyle (Ian Somerhalder), that he may be dating Shannon, and Boone warns him that she is using him. The next day, Sayid tells Shannon that it might not be a good idea for them to date. Shannon goes to confront Boone, but runs into Locke instead. He advises her to start a new life rather than confront Boone. Sawyer ambushes Jin while he is gathering water and knocks him out with a kick to the head. He ties Jin up and escorts him to the beach.

Back at the beach, Michael beats Jin up. As the beating intensifies, Sun surprises everyone, including Jin, by revealing for the first time publicly that she can speak English; she tells Michael to stop and that Jin did not burn the raft, and that the reason Jin's hands are burnt is because he was trying to put the fire out. Locke quells the growing argument by stating that it would be unlikely that one of the survivors burned the raft, suggesting that "the Others" (the possible comrades of Ethan) are responsible and that they aren't alone on the island. Michael decides to make a new raft. Sun goes to see Jin and says (in English) that she was going to leave him and that he changed her mind about leaving. Speaking Korean, she asks him if they can "start all over". However, Jin tells her that it is too late.

At night, Shannon decides to stay with Sayid even though Boone does not like Sayid around her. Locke reveals that he knows Walt burnt the raft when he asks him why he did it, though he promises not to tell anyone. Walt replies by stating that he doesn't want to move anymore (he has moved many times throughout his life), and that he likes it on the island and doesn't want change.

The next morning, on the beach, Sun goes into the ocean in a bathing suit as a free, but lonely woman, and Jin helps Michael build a new raft. Meanwhile, Hugo "Hurley" Reyes (Jorge Garcia) listens to Damien Rice's "Delicate" on his CD player, but the song cuts off midway when the batteries die.

== Production ==
The episode was directed by Tucker Gates and written by Javier Grillo-Marxuach and Leonard Dick. Its flashbacks are from Jin's perspective and mirror those seen in "House of the Rising Sun", an earlier episode also written by Grillo-Marxuach. It was filmed in January 2005.

The episode's guest actors included John Shin, an actor from San Francisco, as Jin's father Mr. Kwon. Despite meeting Dae Kim on their first day of shooting, Shin sought to exude joy and warmth over seeing his character's son again.

== Reception ==
"...In Translation" first aired in the United States on February 23, 2005. An estimated 19.49 million viewers watched the episode, which finished in second place for the night among all major American networks, behind American Idol. Among viewers aged 18–49, the episode finished in ninth place for the week with a ratings share of 7.5/20.

Writing in 2008 for IGN, Chris Carabott criticized the episode for not advancing the series' narrative, describing it as "yet another good character piece" but "fail[ing] at really moving the story forward at all." In another IGN article in 2014, Eric Goldman ranked "...In Translation" as 101st out of all the episodes of Lost, with the episode's low position also due to its lack of narrative advancements. In a 2009 list of his favorite Lost moments, Zap2It's Ryan McGee praised "...In Translation" for "recontextualiz[ing] Sun's flashbacks in "House of the Rising Sun", calling this "storytelling of the highest order." Dan Kawa of Television Without Pity gave the episode a B.

In a 2013 ranking of all Lost episodes, Emily VanDerWerff called Sun and Jin's relationship "the best romance on the show" after Desmond and Penny. Myles McNutt of The A.V. Club wrote in 2014 that the episode was "beautifully rendered", and gave it an A.
