= Jennifer M. Johnson =

American television writer, producer

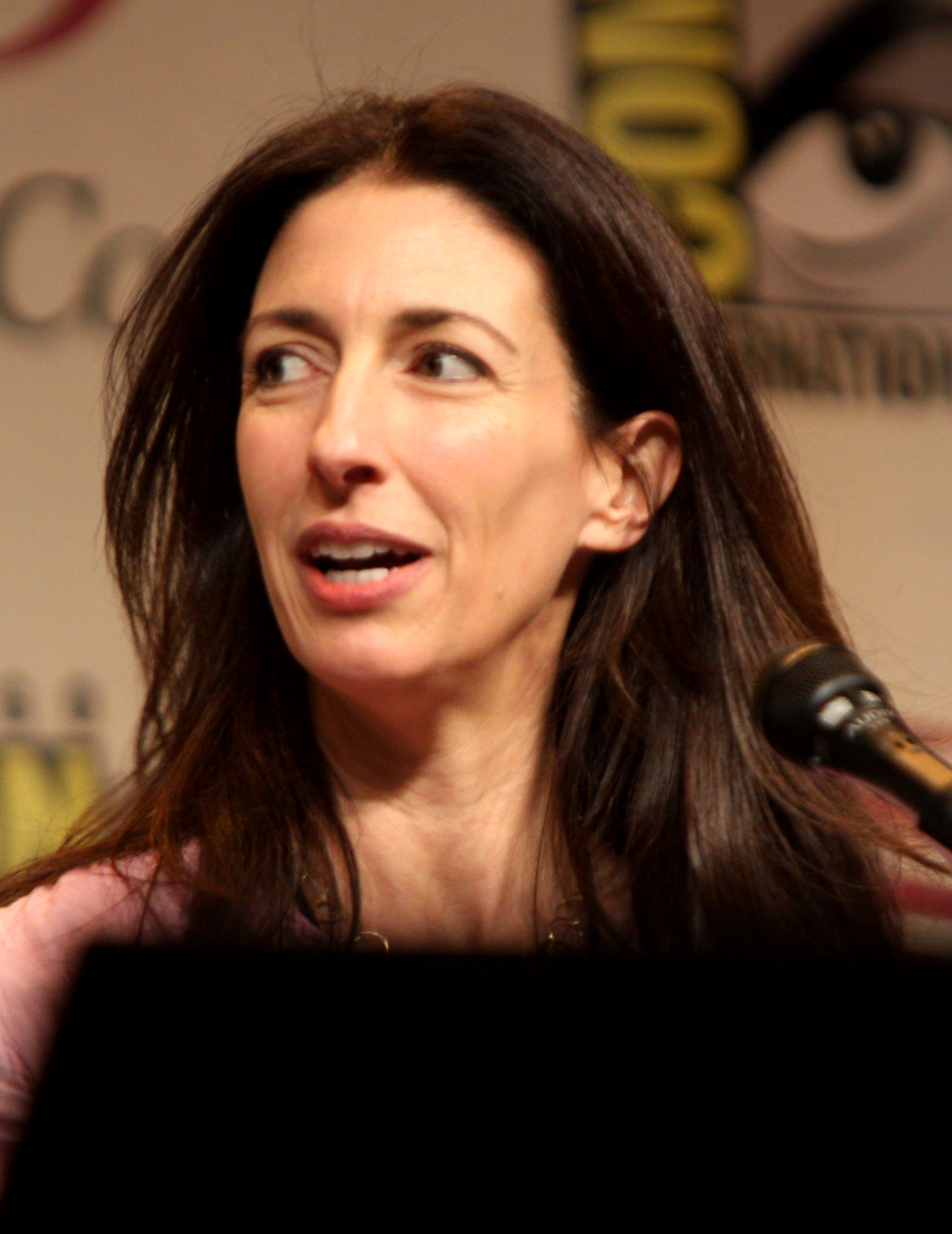
- Johnson at the 2012 Wondercon
- Occupations: Writer, producer
- Years active: 1999–present

Jennifer M. Johnson is an American television writer and producer.

She has worked on the series Lost, Reunion, Cold Case and is the co-creator of the series Chase. Johnson won the Writers Guild of America (WGA) Award for Best Dramatic Series for her work on Lost. She was co-showrunner and executive producer on the FOX series Alcatraz.

== Career ==
Johnson began writing for television on the MTV series Undressed in 1999. She became a story editor and writer for the fourth season of drama Providence in 2001. She wrote the episodes "The Honeymoon's Over" and "The Good Fight" and co-wrote the episode "Smoke and Mirrors" with executive story editor Mike Kelley. She returned for the fifth and final season in 2002 and wrote the episode "Cloak & Dagger" and co-wrote the episode "The Sound of Music" with executive producer Ann Lewis Hamilton.

She became an executive story editor for the third and final season of The Guardian in 2003. She co-wrote the episodes "The Father-Daughter Dance" (with series creator and executive producer David Hollander), "Believe" (with Hollander), "Amends" (with Hollander) and "The Vote" (with supervising producer Rick Eid).

In fall 2004 Johnson joined the crew of Lost as a co-producer and writer for the first season. She co-wrote the episodes "The Moth" (with story editor Paul Dini) and "Whatever the Case May Be" (with series co-creator and executive producer Damon Lindelof). Johnson and the writing staff won the WGA Award for Best Dramatic Series at the February 2006 ceremony for their work on the first season. She left the series after the first season.

She became a producer and writer for the short-lived mystery series Reunion in 2005. She wrote the episodes "1990" and "1995" and wrote the story and co-wrote the teleplay (with creator and executive producer Jon Harmon Feldman) for the episode "1997". The series was canceled before completing its planned twenty episodes.

She became a supervising producer and writer for the fourth season of Cold Case in 2006. She wrote the episodes "The Key" and "The Good-Bye Room". She was promoted to co-executive producer for the fifth season in 2007 and wrote the episodes "Running Around" and "The Road". She was promoted again to executive producer for the sixth season in 2008. She wrote the episode "Wings" and co-wrote the episodes "The Long Blue Line" and "Into the Blue" with fellow executive producer Greg Plageman. She wrote the pilot for the NBC series Chase which went to series and was subsequently canceled during the 2010–2011 TV season.

In September 2011, Johnson was brought on to the FOX mystery series Alcatraz, as executive producer and co-showrunner (along with Daniel Pyne).

Johnson was a co-executive producer and writer for Gang Related, which also aired on FOX.
