= Sung-Hi Lee =

American actress

- Modeling information
- Height: 5 ft 4 in (1.63 m)
- Hair color: Black
- Eye color: Brown

Sung-Hi Lee (Korean: 이승희) is a South Korean former model and actress based in the United States. She has been featured in Playboy magazine as well as in many other magazines and some commercial advertising.

== Career ==
Lee has worked as an actress, appearing in films such as A Night on the Water (1998), Error in Judgment (1998), Chain of Command (2000), Nurse Betty (2000), This Girl's Life (2003), National Lampoon's Christmas Vacation 2: Cousin Eddie's Island Adventure (2003), and as Ferrari in The Girl Next Door (2004). She has also appeared on television, in the Queen of Swords episode "The Dragon" (2001) and landing roles such as DC Comics villain Lady Shiva in 2002's Birds of Prey and the waitress Sophie on the soap opera Days of Our Lives. She also starred on The King of Queens in the 2002 episode "Holy Mackerel". In 2007 she played Tricia Tanaka in the Lost episode "Tricia Tanaka Is Dead" and also appeared in the series premiere of the FOX sitcom Back to You. In 2009, Lee appeared in the action film The Art of War III: Retribution (2009) as Sun Yi, and as Crystal in the comedy Tripping Forward (2009).

Lee has also had a career in modeling, ranging from high-profile adult magazines such as Playboy (in which she was the first Asian model to feature on the cover) to advertisements for Acer Computers, Chrysler, Brut, Miller Beer, Mountain Dew, Maxwell House and Sunkist Juice.

== Filmography ==
=== Film ===
Year	Title	Role	Notes
1997	Midnight Blue	Streetwalker	
1998	A Night on the Water	Phoebe / Hooker	
1999	Error in Judgment	Toni	
1999	Making Contact	Gina	
2000	Chain of Command	Iris	
2000	Nurse Betty	Jasmine	
2000	That Summer in LA	Jackie	
2003	This Girl's Life	Kobi	
2004	The Girl Next Door	Ferrari	
2004	Six: The Mark Unleashed	Beautiful Woman	
2005	Death to the Supermodels	Hoo-Chi	
2006	Red Riding Hood	TV Reporter	
2007	Richard III	Anne	
2009	Crossing Over	Min Kim	
2009	Tripping Forward	Crystal	
2009	The Art of War III: Retribution	Sun Yi	

=== Television ===
Year	Title	Role	Notes
1997	Weapons of Mass Distraction	Kelly	Television film
1997	Pensacola: Wings of Gold	June / Pak Joon Ja	Episode: "Bogey Man"
1997	The Practice	Senator Patanki's Wife	Episode: "Hide and Seek"
1998–1999	Mortal Kombat: Conquest	Kiri	4 episodes
1999	G vs E	Kim	Episode: "Choose Your Own Evil"
2001	Black Scorpion	Giggles	Episode: "He Who Laughs Last"
2001	Queen of Swords	Kami	Episode: "The Dragon"
2001	V.I.P.	Margaret Yi	Episode: "Millenium Man"
2001	Nikki	Dr. Li	Episode: "A Rock and a Hard Place"
2001	Shotgun Love Dolls	Fortune Cookie	Television film
2002	The King of Queens	Katrina Ling	Episode: "Holy Mackerel"
2002	Birds of Prey	Lady Shiva	Episode: "Lady Shiva"
2003	National Lampoon's Christmas Vacation 2	Muka Laka Miki	Television film
2004	Rock Me Baby	Tonya	Episode: "Go, Otis! It's Your Birthday!"
2005	Days of Our Lives	Sophie	4 episodes
2007	Lost	Tricia Tanaka	Episode: "Tricia Tanaka Is Dead"
2007	Back to You	Mimi	Episode: "Pilot"
