= Madison (dog) =

Dog actor (born 1999)

- Species: Canis familiaris
- Breed: Labrador Retriever
- Sex: Female
- Born: November 1999; Hawaii, United States
- Occupation: Actress
- Notable role: Vincent on Lost
- Years active: 2004–2010
- Rygwood Labradors

Madison (born 1999) is a Labrador Retriever, and a dog actor best known for playing the role of Vincent the dog on the television series Lost.

== Biography ==
Madison was born in 1999, she is from Hawaii, and her owner is Kim Stahl, an accountant and part-time dog trainer, with her husband Tim, an Army reservist and computer network engineer. Before becoming a performer, Madison worked as a tracking dog and obedience competitor. In 2001, Madison ranked eighth among the best obedience dogs in Hawaii. Stahl also owns relatives of Madison, including two of her daughters, Byrddee and Jane.

== Career ==
In March 2004 Stahl took Madison to an audition with J.J. Abrams for Lost, she was cast and appeared in sixteen episodes of the first season. Even though she is female, she played a male dog on the show. Vincent was also played by Pono, which features in flashback scenes.

== Filmography ==
- Lost (2004-2010)

== See also ==
- List of individual dogs
