= Dustin Watchman =

American actor (born 1979)

- Born: Dustin Watchman; March 2, 1979 (age 47); Salem, Oregon, United States
- Years active: 2004 - present

Dustin Watchman (born 2 March 1979) is an American actor. He had a recurring role on the television series Lost, portraying Scott Jackson, one of the crash survivors whose name the other survivors continually mixed up with Steve Jenkins, played by Christian Bowman. He appeared in several episodes in seasons 1-6 as a "survivor", Scott Jackson, and a body double for Matthew Fox, Josh Holloway, and Terry O'Quinn. He was also an actor in the movie Battleship as the Samson Battleship Helmsman alongside Alexander Skarsgård. He later was the stand-in and body double for Alex O'Loughlin on the new Hawaii 5-0 TV series for season 1 and part of season 2 before moving overseas in late 2011 to pursue a career in education internationally.

Since 2008, Dustin Watchman has travelled to over 35+ countries and has started an investment company to help small businesses and volunteer opportunities internationally in multiple countries. It is named the Dunawi Group. He is also recently serving his time out in Afghanistan on the NATO base in Kabul assisting with the training of Afghan pilots.

Watchman was born in Salem, Oregon. He attended the University of Hawaiʻi at Mānoa in 2007 for a bachelor's degree in marketing, and Fort Hays State University in 2013 for his master's degree in education.
