= Charlie Pace =

Fictional character of the TV series Lost

- Lost character
- Dominic Monaghan as Charlie Pace
- First appearance: "Pilot (Part 1)"
- Last appearance: "The End"
- Created by: Jeffrey Lieber; J. J. Abrams; Damon Lindelof
- Portrayed by: Dominic Monaghan; Jeremy Shada (young)
- Centric episode(s): "Pilot, Part 2" "The Moth" "Homecoming" "Exodus: Part 2" "Fire + Water" "Greatest Hits"

In-universe information
- Species: Human
- Gender: Male
- Occupation: Rock musician
- Relatives: Liam Pace (brother); Megan Pace (niece)
- Nationality: British
- Former residence: Manchester, England, UK

Charlie Hieronymous Pace is a fictional character on ABC's Lost, a television series chronicling the lives of plane crash survivors on a mysterious tropical island. Played by Dominic Monaghan, Charlie was a regular character in the first three seasons, and continued to make occasional appearances until the final season.

Charlie is introduced as one of the main characters in the pilot episode. Flashbacks from the series show that prior to the plane crash, Charlie was a member of a rock band named Drive Shaft. Initially, Charlie battles with an addiction to heroin. He ultimately achieves sobriety, while establishing a romantic relationship with Claire Littleton (Emilie de Ravin), and acting as a father figure to Claire's son Aaron. In addition, Charlie also develops close friendships with Hugo "Hurley" Reyes (Jorge Garcia), and Desmond Hume (Henry Ian Cusick).

In season three, Charlie begins to face his inevitable death when Desmond repeatedly foresees Charlie's demise. In the season three finale "Through the Looking Glass", Charlie drowns at the hands of Mikhail Bakunin (Andrew Divoff), sacrificing himself in an effort to save the other survivors. Due to Lost's non-linear presentation of events and supernatural elements, Charlie makes several appearances in seasons four and six of the series. Charlie is prominent in the series finale, "The End".

== Character arc ==
=== Prior to the crash ===
Charlie was born in 1979 to Simon and Megan Pace, and lived in Manchester, England. When Charlie was young, he was given a piano as a gift on Christmas Day, thus beginning his career in music. Charlie honed his musical talents by playing on the street for money, where he spotted a woman being mugged and saved her, prompting her to call him a hero.

Sometime later, Charlie and his brother Liam (Neil Hopkins) had formed a band called Drive Shaft, and landed a record deal. Suddenly, Drive Shaft became extremely popular for their song "You All Everybody", although they were a one-hit wonder. Liam, amidst their popularity and success, developed a drug habit and began to neglect the band. On Christmas Day, while touring Finland, Liam gave Charlie a family heirloom (a ring inscribed with the initials D.S. in reference to Dexter Stratton, Charlie and Liam's great-grandfather, after whom the band was named), saying because of his addiction he would never have a family so it should go to Charlie. Eventually, though, Charlie became addicted to heroin. As the band's fame began to decrease, Charlie sank further into his addiction. Liam sold his piano so he could enroll in a drug rehabilitation program after dropping his newborn daughter. Liam left Charlie alone in order to be with his wife, Karen, and daughter, Megan (named after the brothers' mother).

With Drive Shaft disbanded, Charlie resorted to theft in support of his heroin addiction. He charmed a wealthy woman, Lucy, in order to rob her, but she learned of his intentions and left him as he began to develop real feelings for her. Charlie then traveled to Australia to persuade a now-sober Liam to rejoin the band for a comeback tour. Liam refused, offering instead to help him enter a rehabilitation program, but Charlie angrily rebuked him and left to board a plane to Los Angeles scheduled for the next day. The night before the flight, he took heroin with a woman named Lily before fighting with her over the last of his stash until she left angrily. On the plane, he struggles without any heroin and goes to the bathroom to dispose of it after taking some, when the plane begins to crash.

=== After the crash ===
On the second day on the island, he, Jack Shephard (Matthew Fox) and Kate Austen (Evangeline Lilly) journey to the plane's cockpit, where he retrieves his stash of heroin. John Locke (Terry O'Quinn) later discovers his addiction to heroin and in exchange for his guitar, Charlie gives up the drugs. After Jack is trapped in a cave-in, Charlie saves him. Afterwards, Charlie burns his drugs in a fire. When Charlie tries to stop Claire from going back to the beach, both are kidnapped by Ethan Rom (William Mapother). Pursuing him, Jack and Kate find Charlie hung from a tree almost dead. When Claire returns and Ethan comes to recapture her, Charlie kills the latter with a gun.

When Claire goes into labour, Charlie, along with Jin-Soo Kwon (Daniel Dae Kim), helps Kate deliver the baby. When Danielle Rousseau (Mira Furlan) abducts the baby, named Aaron, Charlie and Sayid Jarrah (Naveen Andrews) go to rescue him. Along the way, Charlie and Sayid stop by a Beechcraft carrying several Virgin Mary statues filled with heroin. That night, Charlie and Sayid manage to reclaim Aaron, and bring him safely back to Claire.

In Season 2, Mr. Eko (Adewale Akinnuoye-Agbaje) reveals to Claire the contents of the Virgin Mary statue, creating a rift between her and Charlie. Charlie takes Eko to the Beechcraft where he found them, and the two decide to burn the plane and its contents. However, Charlie secretly keeps a stash hidden in the jungle. Later, he begins experiencing surreal dreams, in which Aaron is in peril. He seeks out Eko, who says Aaron may need to be baptized. Subsequently, Charlie kidnaps Aaron and attempts to baptize him. When caught, Locke violently beats him. As retribution for Locke embarrassing him, Charlie aids James "Sawyer" Ford (Josh Holloway) in conning Jack and Locke out of the Hatch's guns and heroin by assaulting Sun-Hwa Kwon (Yunjin Kim).

Later, Sayid tells Charlie about a prisoner in the Hatch, "Henry Gale" (Michael Emerson). They, along with Ana Lucia Cortez (Michelle Rodriguez), attempt to find the balloon Henry allegedly crashed in. When the three return to the Hatch, they reveal Henry to be an impostor. After this, Charlie begins helping Eko build a church, but is angered when Eko abandons its construction. He finds a box of vaccine, and gives it to Claire for herself and Aaron, beginning to renew their friendship. In Sawyer's tent, Charlie discovers the remaining Virgin Mary statues, and throws them in the ocean. Eko seeks his help in finding the dynamite from the Black Rock ship. Charlie brings him to it, and he and Eko go to the Hatch, with Eko intending to blow open the blast door. After an explosion, Charlie barely escapes the Hatch as it implodes. After the Hatch's implosion, Charlie helps Locke standing guard while Locke communes with the island and helping him rescue Eko from a polar bear's cave. After Eko's death, Desmond starts having visions in which Charlie dies.

Later, Charlie joins Desmond, Hurley and Jin on a hike into the jungle where they find a parachutist named Naomi Dorrit, who crashed on the island. When Jack announces his plan to foil the Others and contact the outside world, Charlie volunteers to swim down to the Looking Glass station and deactivate a device blocking transmissions to and from the island. Desmond accompanies him. He confronts three people, two women who maintain the station and Mikhail. During a confrontation, Mikhail is shot in the chest with a spear gun. Just as Charlie is able to make contact with Penelope Widmore (Sonya Walger) in an adjacent communication room, a mysteriously resurrected Mikhail uses a grenade to destroy the room's porthole, flooding the communication room. To spare Desmond, Charlie locks the door from the inside, and warns him of Naomi's deception by writing 'NOT PENNY'S BOAT' on his hand. Charlie then drowns, sacrificing himself to save the other survivors.

After leaving the island, Hurley has visions of Charlie first at a convenience store, and then later at the asylum Hurley has been committed to. Charlie tells Hurley the people remaining on the island need him, and that he has to return, but disappears when Hurley closes his eyes. In "Something Nice Back Home", Hurley conveys to Jack a message from Charlie: "You're not supposed to raise him" (referring to Aaron, whom Kate and Jack have adopted). Hurley also tells Jack that, according to Charlie, Jack will also be visited.

=== Afterlife ===
In the episode "LA X", Charlie is seen on board Oceanic 815, in the restroom with heroin, as seen in the "Pilot" episode. However; during this "flash-sideways", flight 815 does not crash, and Charlie gets a small bag of heroin lodged in his throat, rendering him unconscious. He is revived by Jack and later arrested for possession of illegal drugs. He later claims, while he was unconscious, he had a vision of a "beautiful, rapturous" woman who is implied to be Claire. Glaring at Jack as he is restrained, he snarls "I was meant to die." In the episode "Recon", Charlie's brother, Liam, was at a police station, the same one Sawyer and Miles work at, asking about Charlie. In the episode "Happily Ever After" Charlie is released from jail and greeted by Desmond Hume. Desmond has been tasked by his boss, Charles Widmore (Alan Dale), with bringing Charlie and his band Drive Shaft to play with Charles' son, Daniel Faraday (Jeremy Davies), at a charity concert. Desmond does not succeed since Charlie runs Desmond's car into the water, which triggers Desmond's memory of Charlie's death in the original timeline. Desmond escapes and rescues Charlie from the submerged vehicle. In the episode "The End", Charlie is tranquilized by Hurley in order to carry him to the concert which he was scheduled to perform. While on stage, he sees Claire sitting in the crowd and realizes she's the one he saw when he almost died. She seems to be flattered by his attention, but then has contractions and goes backstage with Kate. Charlie follows them and while he gets water and blankets, Claire gives birth and remembers her life on the island. Charlie returns and she recognizes him. She takes his hand and he then remembers everything too, and they have an emotional reunion. They are seen in the church along with the other main characters at the series' conclusion.

== Development ==
After appearing in The Lord of the Rings, Dominic Monaghan was offered many fantasy-based roles. He was keen to portray a different role, and wanted a contemporary part which had layers and an edge. Originally Charlie was an older rock musician who had been a big hit in the 1980s but had succumbed to heroin addiction. After the producers enjoyed Monaghan's audition for the character Sawyer, they rewrote the part to make him a younger one-hit wonder musician.

Lynnette Porter and David Lavery, authors of Lost's Buried Treasures: The Unofficial Guide to Everything Lost Fans Need to Know, saw Charlie as a combination of Larry Underwood and Harold Lauder, two characters from the Stephen King novel The Stand. Larry was a one-hit wonder guitarist and singer who had abused drugs and became a hero as he "gradually achieves redemption," similar to Charlie's arc. Charlie's relationship to Claire is mirrored in Harold, an "inveterate loser" who sees himself as a protector to a young woman in the novel. Harold's streak of violence and his clandestine reading of diaries is also reflected in Charlie's character.

Charlie (Hieronymus) Pace is named after the Austrian theologian and historian Hieronymus Pez. This is in keeping with many of the characters in Lost who are named after famous philosophers and theologians, although the name Charlie Pace is also the name of one early member of the Branch Davidian sect that was raided in Waco, Texas in 1993.

In a DVD commentary for "The Moth", Monaghan said he felt Charlie's black hoodie is some sort of "security blanket" that he hides underneath and uses when he feels "lost".

In a Season One DVD featurette, "Backstage with Driveshaft", Dominic Monaghan cites several bands as a direct influence on the fictional band:

What I think Charlie gets confused with is this idea that being on TRL a couple of times in America and maybe being in the Top 20 and having a little run of things over the summer, he thought they were turning into the new Radiohead or the new Oasis or the new Verve.

Monaghan adds:

I think Charlie thinks that his band is a little bit more important than they actually are. He's under the impression that his first album was kind of like Oasis' first album. Y'know, critically acclaimed, didn't sell big numbers, but y'know, in the industry, people gave it respect.

At the 2009 San Diego Comic-Con, Dominic Monaghan returned and confirmed that he would be back in Lost's final season as Charlie for three episodes.

== Reception ==
"No longer are we observing the ex-rocker, the junky, the Laurel to Hurley's Hardy, now we are seeing Charlie as vulnerable and complex human being with a galvanized sense of what makes life worth living."
— Jon Lachonis regarding Charlie in "Greatest Hits" .

Chris Carabott responded positively to the utilization of the character in "The Moth", mentioning, "Dini and Johnson use the various talents of some of the "losties" to further emphasize Charlie's uselessness," and "Charlie's development throughout the episode is striking." However, he did express dissatisfaction at how he was used in season two, believing it took away from a "gem of an episode." In "Homecoming", he commented on his "good nature" and mentioned his flashback "does a great job of contrasting the Charlie we now know on the island."

In his review of "Live Together, Die Alone", Scott Brown of Entertainment Weekly said the writers were "trying to make us hate Charlie," calling him "deeply annoying".

In a review of season three's penultimate episode, Chris Carabott said Charlie's flashbacks could "send shivers up our collective spines," and said he was "annoying at times." Nonetheless, he called the character "someone we can respect." Entertainment Weekly's Jeff Jensen said Charlie "was ready for the spotlight", and Monaghan gave his "best performance yet"." On BuddyTV, his flashbacks were described as bringing audiences "closer to Charlie's human aspect", and it was noted the episode was "wildly successful" in turning Charlie into a relatable character.

The website Television Without Pity ranked him 7th in a list of Lost's "10 Most Worthless Characters", dubbing his backstory "Oasis: Behind the Music". Contrastingly, in a list of the show's "10 Best Backstories", he was ranked 8th. A poll by E! Online named him as the character fans would most like to see return at 43.4% of the vote, more than 30 percentage points higher than his nearest rival.

The one-hit song "You All Everybody" created for Drive Shaft was made available to players of the video game series Rock Band through the Rock Band Network, shortly after the airing of the Lost series finale alongside Geronimo Jackson's "Dharma Lady".
