= Christian Bowman =

American actor

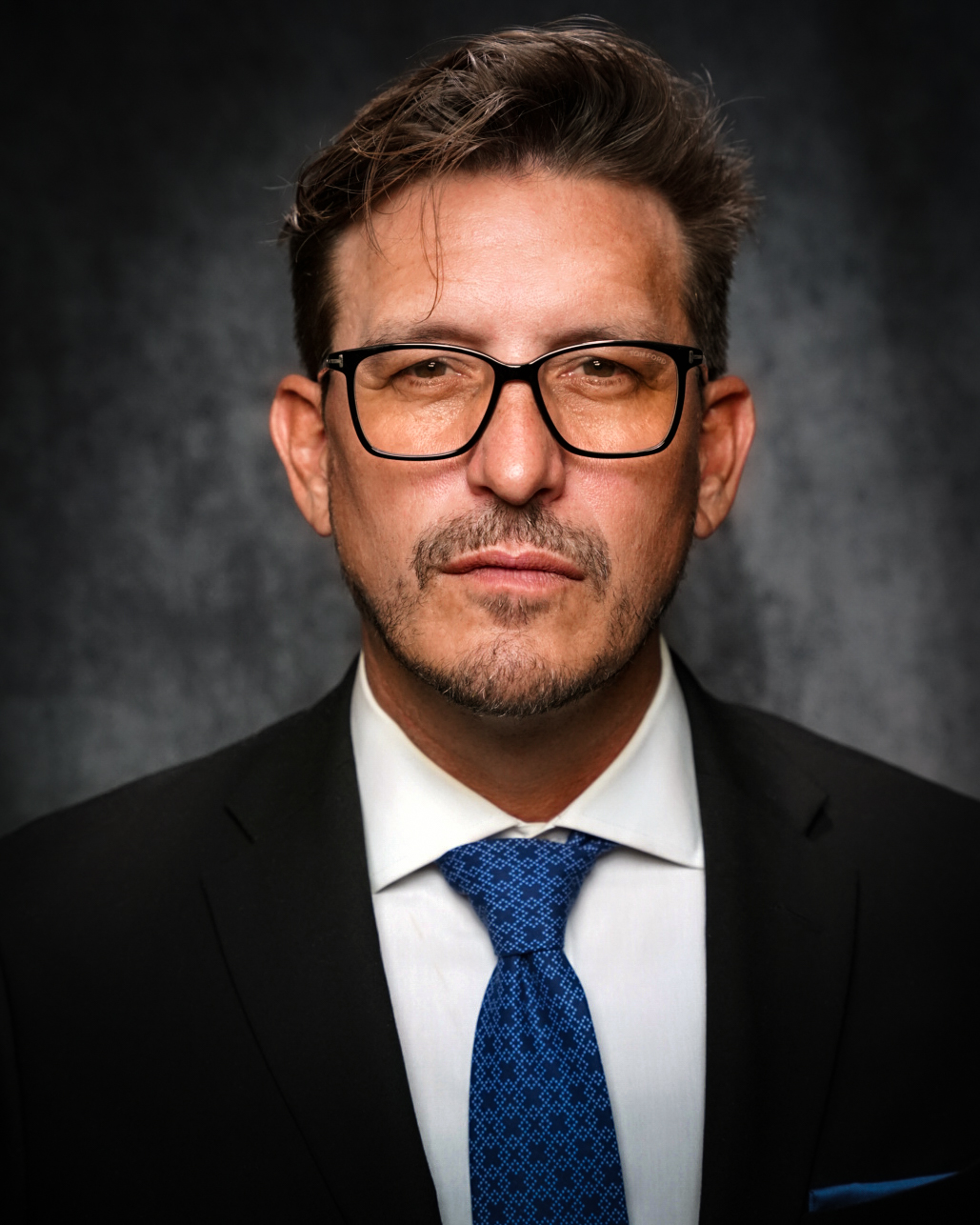
Christian Bowman

Christian Jason Bowman is an actor, director, producer, and screenwriter who has appeared in television shows and films including North Shore, Lost, Prison Break, Sin City: A Dame to Kill For, and Magnum PI.

== Biography ==
Christian Bowman's early years were spent up and down the California coast camping out of a VW Bus before leaving to travel the world as a teenager. When he was seventeen years old, he was involved in a car accident after traveling from Rome, Italy to Chicago, Illinois near Route 66. Four people were killed in the car accident including Bowman's mother, Carolyn Walsh (44), and his girlfriend, Sonia Herzog (21). Christian was the only survivor from his car. The two people in the second vehicle that died were Patricia Shaftic (55), and Katy Sinn (9). Katy's twin sister, Jennifer (9), and her brother, Mike (12), survived.

Bowman continued to travel throughout North America, Africa and Europe after his recovery while establishing a home base with his family on the North Shore of Oahu in Hawaii. He later joined his uncle, skydiver James Darby, in business at Skydive Palm Beach in Florida until Darby's untimely death in a freak skysurfing accident. Christian moved back to Honolulu, Hawaii and his son, Bodhi, was born on May 21, 2001.

He began his acting career on the television show North Shore before being cast as Steve Jenkins, a plane survivor often confused with the character "Scott", on the first season of Lost. Bowman later joined the cast of Prison Break as Agent King, and can be seen in numerous television shows and feature films like Sin City: A Dame to Kill For, and Magnum PI.

In addition to acting, directing, producing, and writing, Christian has worked extensively in Advertising and Commercial production. He holds a Bachelors of Science in Radio Television Film from the University of Texas at Austin, where he was the recipient of the Excellence in Producing award by the Longhorns Creative Foundation. While in Austin, Texas, Bowman provided philanthropy work for a Public Broadcasting Services television show as well as Human Trafficking Awareness campaigns with Matthew McConaughey through Christian's marketing media production company, Last Pull Productions. Before moving back to his home in Honolulu, Hawaii, he worked in Los Angeles with the Screen Actors Guild and the Los Angeles Film School. Bowman is a member of the MBA Cohort at the Shidler College of Business through the University of Hawaiʻi at Mānoa, and also works as Chief Creative Officer for Sight and Sound Productions.

== Film ==
Year	Title	Role	Other notes
2019	Spring Bloom	Actor (Character-Annoyed Customer)	
2018	Eviction	Actor, producer, writer, director (Character-Officer Davis)	
2018	Overcome	Actor, producer, director (Character-Steve)	
2016	May They Light My Way	Actor (Character-Lead)	
2015	Flown	Actor (Character-Kyle)	
2014	Sin City: A Dame to Kill For	Actor (Character-The Man)	
2011	Stok, Stalk, Stock	Actor (Character-Cameraman)	
2012	Enemy of the Mind	Actor (Character-Stone)	
2010	Studio Shot	Director, producer, writer, actor (Character-Derek)	

== Television ==
Year	Title	Role	Other notes
2012	The Lying Game	Door Guard	Complete
2008	Prison Break	Agent King	Complete
2007	Prison Break	Agent King	Complete
2005	Lost	Steve Jenkins	Complete
2004	Lost	Steve Jenkins	Complete
2004	North Shore	Steve "Wildo" Willey	Complete
2021	Magnum PI	Steven Davis	Complete
