= The Man Behind the Curtain (Lost) =

- Lost episode
- Episode no.: Season 3 Episode 20
- Directed by: Bobby Roth
- Written by: Elizabeth Sarnoff; Drew Goddard
- Production code: 320
- Original air date: May 9, 2007
- Running time: 42 minutes

Guest appearances
- Nestor Carbonell as Richard Alpert; Andrew Divoff as Mikhail Bakunin; M. C. Gainey as Tom Friendly; Jon Gries as Roger Linus; Doug Hutchison as Horace Goodspeed; Samantha Mathis as Olivia Goodspeed; Carrie Preston as Emily Linus; Tania Raymonde as Alex; Marsha Thomason as Naomi Dorrit; Sterling Beaumon as Young Ben Linus; Madeline Carroll as Annie; Jenn Boneza as Casey; Gregory Suenaga as Dharma rep; Diamante Kielo as Opal; François Chau as Dr. Marvin Candle

Episode chronology
← Previous "The Brig"	Next → "Greatest Hits"
- Lost season 3

"The Man Behind the Curtain" is the 20th episode of the 3rd season of Lost, and the 69th episode overall. It was first aired on May 9, 2007, on ABC. The episode was directed by Bobby Roth and written by Elizabeth Sarnoff and Drew Goddard.

Ben Linus (Michael Emerson) reluctantly leads John Locke (Terry O'Quinn) to Jacob, the mysterious leader of the Others. The episode is the first to feature flashbacks recounting Ben's backstory.

== Plot ==
=== Flashbacks ===
On December 19, 1964, Emily Linus (Carrie Preston), gives birth to her son in a forest. Afterwards, her husband Roger (Jon Gries), carries her and the baby to the roadside outside Portland, where a car carrying Horace Goodspeed (Doug Hutchison) and Olivia (Samantha Mathis) soon stops to help them. Emily dies after telling Roger to name the baby Benjamin.

Seven years later, Ben (Sterling Beaumon) and his father arrive at the Island to work for the DHARMA Initiative, of which Horace is a member. At one point, Ben sees another vision of his dead mother. This, along with his drunken father blaming him for his mother's death, prompts Ben to sneak into the jungle in search of her. He encounters Richard Alpert (Nestor Carbonell), one of the "Hostiles" who are native to the island. Ben tells Richard that he wants to join the Hostiles on the grounds of not liking the DHARMA Initiative. Richard tells Ben that if he truly wants this, then he must be very, very patient.

Years later, Ben, now a young man working for DHARMA, helps his father Roger load a van. (This is the same van that Hurley had found in "Tricia Tanaka is Dead"). After confronting his father about forgetting his birthday again, Roger suggests they go for a drive together after their work is done, to have some father-son time. After parking atop a hill, Ben asks his father if he blames him for the death of his mother. Roger simply answers "What do I know", and promises to try and remember Ben's birthday the following year. Ben, fed up after years of neglect and abuse, pulls out a gas mask and bids his father goodbye before filling the van with a gas that kills Roger. Ben returns to the barracks, where all the DHARMA workers have died from the same gas, and Alpert and his men emerge wearing masks. As Alpert's men start picking up the bodies, Alpert offers to go and collect Roger's, but Ben tells him to "leave him out there".

=== Locke and the Others ===
John Locke arrives at the Others' camp carrying his father's body on his back, and demands that Ben tell him everything about the Island. Ben tells him that the true leader of the Others is named Jacob, and denies Locke's request to see him. Ben also tells John that he was not born on the island. Soon after, Mikhail Bakunin (Andrew Divoff) stumbles into the camp and talks about a parachutist who landed on the Island, Naomi Dorrit (Marsha Thomason). To convince Ben to bring him before Jacob, Locke beats Mikhail unconscious, while Tom and Richard do not intervene.

Ben and Locke arrive at Jacob's cabin. They enter, but Locke cannot see anyone inside. Ben introduces Locke to Jacob and gestures towards an empty chair, to which he starts talking. Locke tells Ben that he is crazy and pathetic. Just as Locke is about to exit the house, an odd and deep voice says "Help me". Locke pulls out a flashlight, and suddenly, objects in the room begin to violently fly about, windows shatter, and Ben is flung against a wall as a strange man is briefly seen sitting in the chair. Locke and Ben run out of the house.

The following day, Locke still does not believe Jacob is real, and says he will expose Ben as a fraud. Locke notices that Ben is leading them back by a different path, and Ben then leads him to mass grave full of skeletons clothed in DHARMA uniforms. Ben tells Locke that he helped kill his own people when it became clear that the DHARMA workers could not coexist with the natives, and then shoots Locke, who falls into the pit. Locke reveals Jacob said "Help me", and Ben replies that he certainly hopes Jacob helps him, as he departs leaving Locke for dead.

=== At the Beach ===
At the survivors' camp, James "Sawyer" Ford (Josh Holloway) plays Juliet Burke's (Elizabeth Mitchell) tape for Sayid Jarrah (Naveen Andrews) and Kate Austen (Evangeline Lilly). Later that night, the survivors are introduced to Naomi and the tape is played for all to hear. Just then, Jack Shephard (Matthew Fox) and Juliet return to the camp. Juliet tells Sawyer to play the other side of the tape, which is Ben's plan to lead a team to kidnap all the fertile women. Juliet reveals that she has already told Jack about it, and that they were still thinking of a plan.

== Production ==
The episode's title references The Wizard of Oz, as the question of how powerful Ben and the Others as a whole are is compared to "the ferocious and majestical Wizard of Oz, and there was in fact this very small man behind the curtain." Jacob, the mysterious entity who rules the Others, made its first physical appearance. For the scene in the cabin, actor Michael Emerson wrote Jacob's unspoken lines so that it would seem more like a normal conversation was transpiring between the two.

Damon Lindelof describes Richard Alpert's encounter with the young Ben, and Ben and Locke's approach to the cabin as analogous to that of the choosing of the Dalai Lama by the Panchen Lama: "Richard Alpert might be construed as some sort of a Panchen Lama, as he has a conversation with this boy who sees something that he wasn't supposed to see, and now I think Ben finds himself in the role of Panchen Lama as he brings Locke into this cabin, in an attempt to sort of determine whether the island has chosen him to be its new surrogate."

The opening scene, in which we see Ben's mother giving birth to him in a forest, was meant to trick the audience into thinking that the scene took place on the Island - much as the openings of "Man of Science, Man of Faith" and "A Tale of Two Cities" were intended to do the opposite. The part of Emily Linus, Ben's mother, was played by actress Carrie Preston, the real-life wife of Michael Emerson. They had also worked together in other works, such as the 2004 film Straight-Jacket. Preston was cast as Ben's mother following Emerson telling people at parties that she was desperate for a part on the show. Director Bobby Roth said the 1970s scenes try to convey the decade's "full of hope" spirit, where "people try to create a new world". The interior design for the DHARMA installations tried to be utopic, but utilitarian.

== Awards ==
Michael Emerson submitted this episode for consideration for Outstanding Supporting Actor in a Drama Series for the 59th Primetime Emmy Awards, an award he would go on to be nominated for. He lost to fellow cast member Terry O'Quinn for his own submitted episode "The Man from Tallahassee".
