= The Man from Tallahassee =

- Lost episode
- Episode no.: Season 3 Episode 13
- Directed by: Jack Bender
- Written by: Drew Goddard; Jeff Pinkner
- Production code: 313
- Original air date: March 21, 2007
- Running time: 43 minutes

Guest appearances
- Kevin Tighe as Anthony Cooper; Nestor Carbonell as Richard Alpert; Mira Furlan as Danielle Rousseau; M. C. Gainey as Tom Friendly; Brian Goodman as Ryan Pryce; Cleo King as Government worker; Tania Raymonde as Alex; Patrick J. Adams as Peter Talbot; Barbara Baehler as Ms. Talbot; Marlene Forte as Detective Mason; Don Nahaku as Detective Reed; Stephen Bishop as William Kincaid

Episode chronology
← Previous "Par Avion"	Next → "Exposé"
- Lost season 3

"The Man from Tallahassee" is the 13th episode of the 3rd season of Lost, and the 62nd episode overall. It was aired on March 21, 2007, on ABC. The episode was written by Drew Goddard and Jeff Pinkner and directed by Jack Bender. The character of John Locke (Terry O'Quinn) is featured in the episode's flashbacks. The episode received critical acclaim and is considered by critics and fans as one of the best episodes of Lost.

== Plot ==
=== Flashbacks ===
Locke is suffering from depression and becomes a recluse. He goes to a government building and finds out he needs to give unwanted information from him in order to keep getting paid his disability insurance. Later on, in his apartment, he is visited by a young man named Peter Talbot (Patrick J. Adams). Peter reveals Locke's father, con man Anthony Cooper (Kevin Tighe), is trying under the false name "Adam Seward" to marry Peter's mother. Locke later goes to a florist shop where his father goes with Peter's mother. Knowing Cooper only wants to marry the woman to take her money, Locke confronts him and warns Cooper to call off the wedding and end it or he will tell the woman the truth. Cooper reluctantly agrees.

Later, Locke is approached by two detectives, who tell him Peter is dead. Assuming Peter's death was staged by Cooper, Locke goes to Cooper's condo and confronts him, but Cooper denies any involvement. He says Peter's mother was devastated and called off the wedding, and assures Locke that he can call Peter's mother himself if he wants proof. Locke picks up the phone to call her when Cooper suddenly charges him and shoves him through the window. Locke plummets eight stories to the ground, but survives (shown how in a later episode).

As Locke lies in a hospital bed, the two detectives inform him that his father has fled to Mexico and has now disappeared. They leave as a physiotherapist lifts Locke out of bed and places him in his wheelchair for the first time. Locke breaks into tears at not being able to move his legs.

=== On the Island ===
Outside the Others' compound, Locke, Sayid Jarrah (Naveen Andrews), Kate Austen (Evangeline Lilly) and Danielle Rousseau (Mira Furlan) are shocked to see Jack Shephard (Matthew Fox) interacting familiarly with the Others, and Kate insists that the Others have done something to him.

As Rousseau slips away, they sneak into the compound. Kate enters Jack's house and despite her insistence that she will not leave without him, he refuses to go. The door bursts open and two armed Others apprehend her, bringing along a struggling Sayid.

Meanwhile, Locke enters the house of Ben Linus (Michael Emerson). Locke wakes Ben and threatens him, demanding he reveal the location of the submarine. They are interrupted — first by Ben's teenage daughter Alex (Tania Raymonde), whom Locke grabs and hides with in the closet, and then by Tom (M. C. Gainey) and an unseen Richard Alpert (Nestor Carbonell), who tells Ben that they captured Kate and Sayid trying to rescue Jack. Ben tells Tom to separate the two and interrogate them, and instructs Richard to bring him "the man from Tallahassee." After the two leave, Locke asks Alex to get Sayid's pack, and Ben concludes he is doing so to destroy the Others' submarine.

Jack visits the imprisoned Kate to tell her that he made a deal with the Others to let him go home. Alex gets Sayid's pack from him. As she leads Locke to the submarine — not knowing her mother is watching her from the bushes — Alex tells Locke that Ben is manipulating him, because he manipulates everyone. Afterwards Jack visits Ben, asking that his friends be released after he leaves the island. Ben agrees to let them go after Jack and Juliet have left, but knowing that Locke is going to blow up the submarine. Jack and Juliet Burke (Elizabeth Mitchell) are escorted to the dock. They run into Locke as he is walking back up the dock. Jack asks what he's doing there; Locke simply replies "I'm sorry" as the submarine explodes behind him.

Later, Locke is locked in a room in the DHARMA barracks. Ben and Richard open the door, and Locke reveals that he knows Ben wanted him to blow up the sub. Ben reveals that he wanted to find a way to keep Jack from leaving the island, but did not know how to; Locke had solved this problem. Ben and Richard lead Locke down a hallway, and Ben tells him that, for whatever reason, Locke is "in communion" with the island, and that makes him "very, very important." Ben then takes Locke to a room where Cooper is being held captive.

== Production ==
Exposé can be heard on the TV Locke watches in his apartment.

During the last flashback, Anthony Cooper serves a bottle of MacCutcheon 60 whiskey to Locke, the same type used by Charles Widmore (Penelope's father) and Desmond, Charlie and Hurley in "Flashes Before Your Eyes", and Sayid in "He's Our You."

For the scene where Locke is thrown out the window, the footage of Terry O'Quinn ended when Locke is behind a pillar. Afterwards it is a stunt double, who also crashed through a fake window. The aerial scene of Locke falling had the same double falling attached to a harness in front of a bluescreen. The submarine was mostly a prop made of painted styrofoam over a steel structure, but its interior was shot inside the SS-287 at the USS Arizona Memorial.

== Awards ==
Terry O'Quinn submitted this episode for consideration for Outstanding Supporting Actor in a Drama Series for the 59th Primetime Emmy Awards, an award he would go on to win. It was also sent for consideration for Outstanding Writing for a Drama Series.
