= Not in Portland =

- Lost episode
- Episode no.: Season 3 Episode 7
- Directed by: Stephen Williams
- Written by: Carlton Cuse; Jeff Pinkner
- Production code: 307
- Original air date: February 7, 2007
- Running time: 43 minutes

Guest appearances
- Željko Ivanek as Edmund Burke; M. C. Gainey as Tom Friendly; Michael Bowen as Danny Pickett; Blake Bashoff as Karl; Nestor Carbonell as Richard Alpert; William Mapother as Ethan Rom; Tania Raymonde as Alex; Robin Weigert as Rachel Carlson; Rob McElhenney as Aldo; Kimberly Estrada as Sherry; Ariston Green as Jason; Steve Labrash as Morgue employee; Teddy Wells as Ivan

Episode chronology
← Previous "I Do"	Next → "Flashes Before Your Eyes"
- Lost season 3

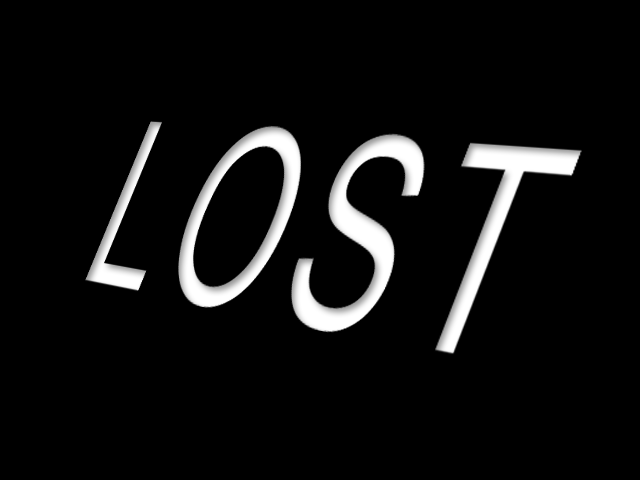
'Lost' logo

"Not in Portland" is the 7th episode of the third season of Lost and the 56th episode overall. It first aired on February 7, 2007, on ABC. The episode was written by Carlton Cuse and Jeff Pinkner and was directed by Stephen Williams. The character of Juliet Burke (Elizabeth Mitchell) is featured in the episode’s flashbacks.

== Plot ==
=== Flashbacks ===
In Miami, Florida, fertility doctor Juliet Burke cares for her ill sister, Rachel Carlson (Robin Weigert), in a hospital where Ethan Rom (William Mapother) works. Juliet is currently injecting Rachel with a drug that would revert her sterility caused by chemotherapy. While Juliet is sneaking into the research laboratory where she works to steal more of the drug, she is discovered by her boss and ex-husband Edmund Burke (Željko Ivanek), who the next day confronts Juliet regarding the research she has been conducting on her sister, asking to be involved in the project. Juliet, however, does not give him an answer.

Juliet is then interviewed by Richard Alpert (Nestor Carbonell) from a biomedical research company called Mittelos Bioscience, asking her to join their office in Portland, Oregon. However, Juliet begins to cry, stating that Edmund would never let her go and short of "getting hit by a bus", she was bound to him. Apologizing, Juliet leaves, adding that she is no leader. When Juliet comes home, Rachel is there, telling that the treatment worked and she is pregnant. Juliet then speaks to her ex-husband and tells him about her sister's pregnancy. Edmund is happy and wants all her data but Juliet is adamant against publishing. Edmund is upset when he steps out in the road and is immediately hit by a bus.

At the morgue to identify Edmund's body and sign the paperwork, Juliet cries and Ethan appears, handing her some tissues. Alpert introduces him as his colleague. Juliet thinks aloud about her comment to Alpert regarding Edmund getting hit by a bus, but Alpert says he does not recall, and that Juliet cannot blame herself for that "tragic accident." He knows about Rachel's pregnancy because of their "very thorough recruitment process" and asks once more for Juliet to join their research, just for six months. Juliet asks whether she can bring her sister, but Alpert admits it may be difficult for her to get her treatment at such a remote facility, as it is in fact "not quite in Portland."

=== On the Island ===
Jack Shephard (Matthew Fox) holds Ben Linus (Michael Emerson) hostage in the operating room as Kate Austen (Evangeline Lilly) and James "Sawyer" Ford (Josh Holloway) escape. Juliet reveals to him that they cannot escape, as the Hydra facility is on a separate island. Angry, Jack reveals to Tom (M. C. Gainey) that Juliet had previously asked him to kill Ben during surgery, making Tom ask Juliet to leave the room.

Meanwhile, Kate and Sawyer go into the jungle to escape the Others. Alex Rousseau (Tania Raymonde) helps them temporarily hide from their pursuers, and then reveals that she has a boat Kate and Sawyer may use to escape to the main island. In return, she asks them to help her rescue her boyfriend, Karl (Blake Bashoff). The three get him from a facility where Karl appears to be undergoing Ludovico technique brainwashing.

Ben awakens from the anesthesia, having overheard Jack's discussion with Tom, and demands to speak to Juliet in private. After talking to Ben, she instructs Jack to finish the surgery and she will help his friends escape. While Jack finishes Ben's operation with the help of Tom, Juliet kills Danny Pickett (Michael Bowen) as he finds the fugitives on the beach and is about to shoot Sawyer. Juliet then tells Alex that she must remain as Karl, Kate and Sawyer start rowing away from Hydra Island. Later Juliet talks to Jack in the Hydra, saying that Jack will return to his cell until they figure out what to do with him. When Jack asks what Ben told her to make Juliet want to save his life, she replies that after more than three years on the island, Juliet would be allowed to leave the island and go home if she let Ben live and helped Jack's friends escape.

== Production ==
This was the first episode to air after a thirteen-week hiatus. Adewale Akinnuoye-Agbaje (Mr. Eko) is no longer credited with the starring cast.

Nestor Carbonell was originally contracted to guest star in "Not in Portland", with the possibility of the role becoming recurring. After the producers enjoyed his performance, his contract was extended to five further appearances in season three. Rob McElhenney made a guest appearance as "Aldo" because he was friends with Damon Lindelof who was also a fan of the sitcom It's Always Sunny in Philadelphia which McElhenney created and stars in.

== Reception ==
14.49 million American viewers tuned into this episode. IGN's Chris Carabott wrote that "if 'Not in Portland' didn't get you back on the Lost hype train then for goodness' sake the equally outstanding 'Flashes Before Your Eyes' hopefully grabbed your attention."
