= Lost season 3 =

Season of television series

Lost
- Season 3
- DVD cover
- Showrunners: Damon Lindelof; Carlton Cuse
- Starring: Adewale Akinnuoye-Agbaje; Naveen Andrews; Henry Ian Cusick; Emilie de Ravin; Michael Emerson; Matthew Fox; Jorge Garcia; Josh Holloway; Daniel Dae Kim; Yunjin Kim; Evangeline Lilly; Elizabeth Mitchell; Dominic Monaghan; Terry O'Quinn; Kiele Sanchez; Rodrigo Santoro
- No. of episodes: 23

Release
- Original network: ABC
- Original release: October 4, 2006 – May 23, 2007

Season chronology
- ← Previous; Season 2 Next → Season 4

The third season of the American serial drama television series Lost commenced airing in the United States and Canada on October 4, 2006, and concluded on May 23, 2007. The third season continues the stories of a group of over 40 people who have been stranded on a remote island in the South Pacific, after their airplane crashed 68 days prior to the beginning of the season. In the Lost universe, the season takes place from November 28 to December 21, 2004. The producers have stated that as the first season is about introducing the survivors and the second season is about the hatch, the third season is about the Others, a group of mysterious island inhabitants.

In response to fan complaints about scheduling in the previous seasons, ABC decided to air the episodes without reruns, albeit in two separate blocks. In the United States, the first block consisted of six episodes aired on Wednesdays at 9:00 pm and after a twelve-week break, the season continued with the remaining 16 episodes at 10:00 pm. In addition, three clip-shows recapped previous events on the show. "Lost: A Tale of Survival" aired a week before the season premiere, "Lost Survivor Guide" aired before the seventh episode and "Lost: The Answers" aired before the season finale. Buena Vista Home Entertainment released the season under the title Lost: The Complete Third Season – The Unexplored Experience on December 11, 2007, in Region 1 on DVD and Blu-ray Disc.

== Crew ==
The season was produced by Touchstone Television (now ABC Studios), Bad Robot and Grass Skirt Productions and was aired on the American Broadcasting Company network in the United States of America. The executive producers for the third season were co-creator J. J. Abrams, co-creator Damon Lindelof, Bryan Burk, Jack Bender, Jeff Pinkner and Carlton Cuse. The staff writers were Lindelof, Cuse, Pinkner, co-executive producers Edward Kitsis & Adam Horowitz, co-executive producer Drew Goddard, supervising producer Elizabeth Sarnoff, story editor Christina M. Kim and executive story editor Brian K. Vaughan. The regular directors were Bender, supervising producer Stephen Williams, Paul Edwards and Eric Laneuville. Lindelof and Cuse served as the showrunners.

== Cast ==
From left to right: Ben, Kate, Sawyer, Claire, Charlie, Jack, Locke, Sayid, Sun, Desmond, Hurley, Jin and Juliet

=== Main ===
This season featured sixteen actors with star billing playing major characters. The list is in alphabetical order by the actors' last names.

- Adewale Akinnuoye-Agbaje as warlord turned priest Mr. Eko
- Naveen Andrews as Sayid Jarrah, a former Iraqi Republican Guard
- Henry Ian Cusick was promoted to the main cast, playing three-year islander Desmond Hume
- Emilie de Ravin as single new mother Claire Littleton
- Michael Emerson as Ben Linus, the manipulative leader of the Others
- Matthew Fox as doctor Jack Shephard, the leader of the castaways
- Jorge Garcia as unlucky millionaire and comic relief Hugo "Hurley" Reyes
- Josh Holloway as the sardonic con-man James "Sawyer" Ford
- Daniel Dae Kim as non-English speaking Jin Kwon, the son of a fisherman
- Yunjin Kim as Jin's English-speaking pregnant wife Sun
- Evangeline Lilly as fugitive Kate Austen, who is unsure whether she loves Jack or Sawyer more
- Elizabeth Mitchell joins the cast as fertility specialist Juliet Burke, an Other trying to escape the Island
- Dominic Monaghan as former rock star Charlie Pace
- Terry O'Quinn as John Locke, an alienated survivor with a deep connection to the island
- Kiele Sanchez and Rodrigo Santoro also join as previously unseen crash survivors Nikki and Paulo

=== Special guest stars ===
These actors each had star billing in at least one episode of the show, but they do not have star billing in any episodes this season.

- Maggie Grace as Shannon Rutherford, a survivor of Oceanic Flight 815, who is Boone Carlyle's step sister
- Malcolm David Kelley as Walt Lloyd, a survivor of Oceanic Flight 815
- Ian Somerhalder as Boone Carlyle, a survivor of Oceanic Flight 815, who is Shannon's step brother

=== Recurring ===
- Sam Anderson as Bernard Nadler, a survivor of Oceanic Flight 815, who is Rose's husband
- Blake Bashoff as Karl, an Other, who is Alex's boyfriend
- Michael Bowen as Danny Pickett, an Other
- L. Scott Caldwell as Rose Henderson, a survivor of Oceanic Flight 815, who is Bernard's wife
- Nestor Carbonell as Richard Alpert, an Other, who does not age
- Andrew Divoff as Mikhail Bakunin, an Other, who wears an eye patch
- Mira Furlan as Danielle Rousseau, who is the only surviving member of a team of scientists who arrived on a ship to the island sixteen years ago, and is Alex's mother
- M. C. Gainey as Tom Friendly, an Other
- Kimberley Joseph as Cindy, survivor of Oceanic Flight 815, who is kidnapped by the Others
- William Mapother as Ethan Rom, an Other
- Tania Raymonde as Alex Rousseau, a young woman kidnapped and raised by the Others, who is Danielle's long lost daughter
- Marsha Thomason as Naomi Dorrit, a woman who arrives on the Island.
- Sonya Walger as Penny Widmore, Desmond's girlfriend back home

== Reception ==
=== Critical reception ===
After criticism… reached its zenith, the backlash drew a backlash. Down the stretch, critics lauded Lost for one powerhouse episode after another, satisfying frustrated viewers by providing long-sought answers to some mysteries while simultaneously igniting strong new plotlines.

— Variety magazine

On Rotten Tomatoes, the season has an approval rating of 71% with an average score of 7.9/10 based on 12 reviews. The website's critical consensus reads, "Lost asks its audience to suspend their disbelief in ways that can be extremely trying for the grounded sci-fi show, but its character-driven plot holds season three together."

The first block of episodes was criticized for raising too many mysteries and not providing enough answers. Complaints were also made about the limited screen-time for many of the main characters in the first block. Locke, played by Terry O'Quinn, who had tied for the highest second-season episode count, appeared in only 14 of the 23 episodes in the third season – only two more than guest star M.C. Gainey, who played Tom. Reaction to two new characters, Nikki and Paulo, was generally negative, with Lindelof even acknowledging that the couple was "universally despised" by fans. The decision to split the season and the American timeslot switch after the hiatus were also criticized. Cuse acknowledged that "No one was happy with the six-episode run."

The second block of episodes, however, was critically acclaimed, with the crew dealing with problems from the first block. More answers were written into the show and Nikki and Paulo were killed off. It was also announced that the series would end three seasons after the third season, which Cuse hoped would tell the audience that the writers knew where the story was going.

=== Awards and nominations ===
The third season was nominated for six Primetime Emmy Awards. It was nominated for Outstanding Directing for a Drama Series (Jack Bender for "Through the Looking Glass), Outstanding Writing for a Drama Series (Damon Lindelof and Carlton Cuse for "Through the Looking Glass"), Outstanding Supporting Actor in a Drama Series (Michael Emerson), Outstanding Single Camera Picture Editing for a Drama Series, and Outstanding Sound Editing for a Series. Terry O'Quinn won for Outstanding Supporting Actor in a Drama Series.

"Flashes Before Your Eyes", written by Damon Lindelof and Drew Goddard, was nominated for a Writers Guild of America Award in the "Episodic Drama" category. The producers were nominated for a Producers Guild Award in the "TV Drama" category. Lost's stunt team was nominated for the season's only Screen Actors Guild Award. Lost's third season also received a Television Critics Association nomination in the drama category. The season also received two Directors Guild Award nominations, Eric Laneuville for "The Brig" and Jack Bender for "Through the Looking Glass".

=== Ratings ===
The season averaged 13.74 million American viewers per episode, ranking 17th in viewership and ninth in the key adults 18–49 demographic. The first block had an average close to four million more viewers than the second block, with the 14th episode meeting a ratings low for the series, with 11.52 million viewers. However, Lost was the most recorded program of 2007.

== Episodes ==
"Featured character(s)" refers to the character(s), whose back story is featured in the episode's flashbacks.

No. overall	No. in season	Title	Directed by	Written by	Featured character(s)	Original release date	U.S. viewers (millions)
50	1	"A Tale of Two Cities"	Jack Bender	Story by : Damon Lindelof; Teleplay by : J. J. Abrams & Damon Lindelof	Jack	October 4, 2006	18.82
In a village, the Others watch Oceanic Flight 815 crash, and Ben Linus or "Henry Gale" (Note: An alias he used throughout season 2.) orders Ethan Rom and Goodwin Stanhope (Note: An Other that was killed while tricking a group of survivors, first seen in "The Other 48 Days".) to infiltrate the survivors. Off the island, Jack obsessively tries to find out who Sarah Wagner is dating, suspecting it to be Christian Shephard. He fights him at an AA meeting and Sarah bails him out of jail, leaving with another man. In the present, Sawyer wakes in a cage outside the "Hydra" station after being abducted by the Others, (Note: As depicted in "Live Together, Die Alone".) being freed by Other Karl Martin, though both are quickly caught. Kate is put in Karl's now vacant cage. Jack wakes in a cell underneath the station, where he tries and fails to escape. Interrogator Juliet Burke shows Jack a file that documents his entire life and tells him that Sarah is happy.
51	2	"The Glass Ballerina"	Paul Edwards	Jeff Pinkner & Drew Goddard	Sun & Jin	October 11, 2006	16.89
Woo-Jung Paik discovers that Sun is having an affair with Jae-Young Lee (Note: A young, wealthy man that Sun was set up to marry, first seen in "...And Found".) and orders Jin to kill him, who is unaware of the infidelity. Jin beats him and Lee commits suicide, unable to be with Sun. In the present, the Kwons and Sayid have taken the Elizabeth to meet Jack's group, unaware that they have been kidnapped. Ben orders Colleen Pickett to steal the boat and she is shot by Sun. Forced to work in a quarry, Sawyer tries to escape by kissing Kate and disarming the guards who come to break them up, but is forced to stand down when Juliet threatens to kill her. He and Kate discuss escaping in their cells, unaware that Ben is monitoring them through cameras. Ben promises Jack that they will be let go if they cooperate and proves that the Others have contact with the outside world.
52	3	"Further Instructions"	Stephen Williams	Carlton Cuse & Elizabeth Sarnoff	Locke	October 18, 2006	16.31
Having joined a marijuana commune, Locke befriends an undercover cop. The leaders learn his identity and Locke confronts him. He admits that his superior saw Locke as easily manipulated and is allowed to leave. In the present, Locke returns to camp after surviving the Swan's destruction (Note: As depicted in "Live Together, Die Alone".) and takes hallucinogens, learning from a vision of Boone that Eko is trapped in a polar bear's cave. He rescues him, while a returning Hurley encounters a deranged Desmond, who talks about Locke having made a seemingly non-existent speech about saving their friends. Hurley informs the camp of the trio's abduction and Locke makes his speech.
53	4	"Every Man for Himself"	Stephen Williams	Edward Kitsis & Adam Horowitz	Sawyer	October 25, 2006	17.09
Imprisoned after conning Cassidy Phillips, (Note: A woman Sawyer fell in love with, first seen in "The Long Con".) Sawyer learns he had a daughter with her. Sawyer manipulates a man who stole millions into giving up its location and sells it to the warden to commute the rest of his sentence, asking that his cut be put in an account for his baby. In the present, Desmond builds a lighting rod next to Claire's hut hours before a storm that would have destroyed it. Ben has a pacemaker implanted in Sawyer that will explode if his heart rate gets too high. Juliet gets Jack to operate on Colleen, but she dies during, while Jack notices nearby x-rays of a man with a spinal tumor. Her widower Danny tries to kill Sawyer, forcing Kate to admit that she loves him to keep him alive. Ben brings Sawyer to the edge of the island, revealing that the pacemaker was faked and they are on a smaller island separate from the one he crashed on.
54	5	"The Cost of Living"	Jack Bender	Alison Schapker & Monica Owusu-Breen	Mr. Eko	November 1, 2006	16.07
After Yemi's death, (Note: As depicted in "The 23rd Psalm".) Eko takes over his church and learns that guerillas are stealing the town's vaccines. Eko plans to sell the vaccines first and is attacked, but kills the men inside the church. The villagers close it down and Eko is advised to repent. In the present, Juliet asks Jack to operate on Ben and "accidentally" let him die. Locke leads a group to the Pearl and they encounter a delirious Eko, who does not join them in the station when he cannot find Yemi's body in the Beechcraft. The group turns on other cameras, finding one station run by a one-eyed man who turns his camera off. A vision of Yemi tells Eko to confess his sins, who insists that his actions were always to survive and protect those he loved. Yemi denies being his real brother and walks off, and Eko follows him and is attacked by the smoke monster. The group finds him dying, and he tells Locke that "you're next."
55	6	"I Do"	Tucker Gates	Damon Lindelof & Carlton Cuse	Kate	November 8, 2006	17.15
Kate marries and finds happiness with a man but is called by Edward Mars, who promises to stop chasing her if she can truly settle down. After taking a negative pregnancy test, she tells her husband the truth, drugs him, and flees. In the present, Locke, certain that Eko died for a reason, notices a bible verse on his staff saying to "look north." Believing Ben will not free them if he removes the tumor, Jack refuses despite Kate insisting that Danny will kill Sawyer. She has sex with Sawyer when returning to her cage, and Ben "accidentally" lets Jack out to view it on the cameras, convincing him to operate. As Danny prepares to kill Sawyer, Jack cuts Ben's kidney during surgery, giving him an hour to live unless fixed and refusing to save him unless Kate and Sawyer get to leave.
56	7	"Not in Portland"	Stephen Williams	Carlton Cuse & Jeff Pinkner	Juliet	February 7, 2007	14.49
While treating her sick sister Rachel with an experimental drug that restores fertility, Juliet is interviewed by researcher Richard Alpert. She explains that her ex-husband and boss wouldn't let her quit unless he was "hit by a bus," which happens to him the next day. Ethan and Alpert rebuff her questions about his death and ask Juliet to join them in their work. In the present, Juliet tells Jack that they are on another island, so he tells Tom about her plan to kill Ben. Ben wakes and convinces her to trade Kate and Sawyer's safety for Jack's finishing the surgery. Alex Rousseau (Note: Rousseau's long-lost daughter who was kidnapped as a baby by the Others, first seen in "Maternity Leave".) helps Sawyer and Kate escape from Danny and promises them a boat if they rescue her boyfriend Karl, who is being held in a brainwashing facility. They save him but are stopped by Danny, whom Juliet kills. Jack asks Juliet what Ben offered her to renege on her plot against him, and she says that he promised to finally let her leave the island after three years.
57	8	"Flashes Before Your Eyes"	Jack Bender	Damon Lindelof & Drew Goddard	Desmond	February 14, 2007	12.84
Desmond saves Claire from drowning and Charlie presses him to admit his precognitive abilities. He attacks Charlie when accused of cowardice, remembering what happened to him after the Swan blew. He wakes in 1996 and recognizes Charlie, but finds his abilities failing him after a fight he witnessed does not happen. While Desmond ring shops for Penny Widmore, shopkeeper Eloise Hawking correctly predicts that a nearby man will die, explaining that it was destined and that he would have died later even if saved. Desmond leaves Penny because he does not have enough money to support them and later witnesses the fight, realizing he miscounted the day it took place. He is injured trying to stop it and wakes up after the Swan explosion. In the present, Desmond admits that Charlie would have died both times he saved Claire, meaning he is destined to die soon.
58	9	"Stranger in a Strange Land"	Paris Barclay	Elizabeth Sarnoff & Christina M. Kim	Jack	February 21, 2007	12.95
While in Thailand, Jack begins seeing a local tattoo artist, whom he bullies into giving him a tattoo. The next day, he is beaten and exiled by locals when they see his markings. In the present, Kate and Sawyer return to the island, where Karl explains that the Others live there but do their work on Hydra Island; he then leaves to save Alex. With Juliet under scrutiny after killing Danny, Jack is asked if she asked him to kill Ben, which he denies. He is put in the outside cages, where he is observed by a large group of tailies, now part of the Others. Jack treats Ben's infected back, getting Juliet's sentence reduced from execution to branding. As Jack is taken back to the island, an Other translates his tattoo: "He walks amongst us, but he is not one of us."
59	10	"Tricia Tanaka Is Dead"	Eric Laneuville	Edward Kitsis & Adam Horowitz	Hurley	February 28, 2007	12.78
Hurley buys his old workplace with his lottery money, only for it to be destroyed by a meteorite. As he plans to go to Australia to break his curse, his absent father David Reyes returns to get in on the money. He bribes a tarot card reader to convince Hurley she can remove the curse, but when Hurley learns she is a fraud, he vows to take his trip. In the present, Vincent leads Hurley to a van in the jungle with a dead DHARMA worker inside. He puts a group together to fix it, deciding to have them push the van down a hill so that he can jump-start it. Charlie, paranoid about dying, decides to risk riding with Hurley to get rid of his fear, and the van starts just before they crash. Determined to save Jack, Kate takes Sayid and Locke to Danielle Rousseau, whom she convinces to work with them when she mentions meeting Alex.
60	11	"Enter 77"	Stephen Williams	Carlton Cuse & Damon Lindelof	Sayid	March 7, 2007	12.45
Hiding out in Paris, Sayid is detained by a man whose wife he tortured. Sayid insists that he never hurt the woman until she talks to him alone, getting him to admit that he is haunted by guilt over her. She gets her husband to let him go. In the present, Kate's group comes across the "Flame" station, where they get in a standoff with the one-eyed man, Mikhail Bakunin. Sayid realizes he is an Other and restrains him while Locke beats the station's computer in chess and unlocks a secret menu. Mikhail attacks him while Sayid and Kate find an Other hiding in the station and hold her hostage. Mikhail kills her to prevent information from leaking, and the station explodes when Locke enters a code in the menu signifying that the Others raided the station.
61	12	"Par Avion"	Paul Edwards	Christina M. Kim & Jordan Rosenberg	Claire	March 14, 2007	12.48
Claire's mother Carole falls into a coma after a car accident and is visited in the hospital by Christian, who tells Claire that he is her father. Disgusted at being the result of an affair, she tells him to leave. In the present, she realizes that seagulls on the island may be tagged, but Charlie, having been warned by Desmond to avoid fatal situations, refuses to help. Desmond uses his abilities to help her catch a gull and admits the truth about Charlie's inevitable death. She reconciles with Charlie and they attach a note to the gull before setting it free. Mikhail explains that the Swan's EMP damaged the Others' underwater "Looking Glass" beacon station, meaning their submarine would not be able to return if it left the island. They reach the Others' "sonar fence," and Locke tests Mikhail's claim that is offline by pushing him through it, killing him. The group builds a ladder to climb over the perimeter and makes it to the "Barracks", revealed to be the Others' village, and find Jack living comfortably amongst them.
62	13	"The Man from Tallahassee"	Jack Bender	Drew Goddard & Jeff Pinkner	Locke	March 21, 2007	12.22
A man asks Locke to help him stop Anthony Cooper from marrying and robbing his mother. Locke rebuffs him but demands Cooper leave the family alone, and the man is found dead soon after. When Locke confronts Cooper about what happened, Cooper throws him out a window and flees the country, leaving Locke paraplegic. In the present, Kate and Sayid are captured after finding Jack compliant, having made a deal with Ben to be allowed to leave in the sub. Locke kidnaps Alex, whom Ben claims as his daughter, and demands the location of the sub, which he destroys. Ben reveals that he never wanted Jack to leave and Locke solved his problem for him, showing him that the Others have captured Cooper.
63	14	"Exposé"	Stephen Williams	Edward Kitsis & Adam Horowitz	Nikki & Paulo	March 28, 2007	11.52
Survivor couple Paulo and Nikki Fernandez kill a TV producer and steal his diamonds, but lose them in the crash. Paulo recovers them and hides them in the Pearl. He happens upon Ben and Juliet, and they discuss a plan to turn Jack by kidnapping Kate and Sawyer with him, and Paulo takes a radio they leave behind. In the present, Nikki stumbles onto the beach before dying and Paulo is found dead nearby. When the survivors find the radio, Sun suspects the Others killed them after her attempted kidnapping, (Note: As depicted in "The Long Con".) forcing Charlie to admit that it was staged by him and Sawyer. After finding the diamonds, Sawyer tries to give them to Sun as penance, but she rebuffs him. A flashback reveals that Nikki discovered Paulo had the diamonds and set a temporarily paralyzing spider on him, only to also be bitten. She buried the diamonds and ran to the beach, and in the present, she opens her eyes just before the two are buried alive.
64	15	"Left Behind"	Karen Gaviola	Damon Lindelof & Elizabeth Sarnoff	Kate	April 4, 2007	11.66
Returning home to find out why Diane Janssen sold her out, (Note: As depicted in "What Kate Did".) Kate meets Cassidy, who helps her get to Diane. She admonishes Kate for killing Wayne Janssen, whom she loved despite his abuse. Kate parts ways with Cassidy after encouraging her to turn in the man who conned her, unaware it is Sawyer. In the present, the Others abandon the Barracks and Locke goes with them, while Kate is gassed and wakes up in the jungle handcuffed to Juliet. As they walk back to the Barracks, Juliet tells Kate that Jack intended to stay with the Others because she chose Sawyer over him. They are attacked by the monster, which Juliet fends off with the sonar fence. Returning to the Barracks, they regroup with Sayid and Jack, the latter of whom insists that Juliet come back with them.
65	16	"One of Us"	Jack Bender	Carlton Cuse & Drew Goddard	Juliet	April 11, 2007	12.09
Juliet is taken to the island to solve the problem of pregnant Others dying. Ben offers to cure Rachel's cancer if Juliet stays, later showing her through the Flame's cameras that Rachel had been cured as promised. In the present, Jack is the only one who trusts Juliet upon the group's return to camp. Claire falls ill and Juliet explains why she was brought to the island, having given Claire medication to keep her alive, (Note: Occurred during the events of "Maternity Leave".) making her the first woman to survive giving birth on the island. She retrieves serum from Ethan's stash and gives it to Claire, restoring her health, and is allowed to move onto the beach. A flashback shows Ben ordering her to set up the handcuffing to gain Kate's trust after Claire's "implant" is "activated" and promising to meet her in a week.
66	17	"Catch-22"	Stephen Williams	Jeff Pinkner & Brian K. Vaughan	Desmond	April 18, 2007	12.08
Desmond joins a monastery to avoid marrying his fiancée and she accuses him of cowardice, prompting him to drink the wine the monastery sells and be kicked out. As he helps a monk load their wine, he meets the buyer, Penny. In the present, Desmond has visions of Charlie dying in one of Rousseau's traps while out in the jungle with him, Jin, and Hurley. Desmond gathers the three and they hike out, witnessing a helicopter crash and a parachutist landing in the jungle. They find their belongings nearby, among which is a picture of Penny and Desmond, convincing him that she has come for him. He narrowly saves Charlie when they get to the point of his death, though he fears that saving him may alter the future and prevent him from getting to Penny. They find her, only to realize she is a different woman.
67	18	"D.O.C."	Frederick E.O. Toye	Edward Kitsis & Adam Horowitz	Sun	April 25, 2007	11.86
A woman blackmails Sun over Jin being the son of a prostitute. His father confirms this when Sun goes to visit him, and Woo-Jung gives Sun the money on the condition that Jin begins working as his enforcer. Realizing that the woman is Jin's mother, Sun warns her to never return. In the present, Juliet takes Sun to the Staff to test her baby's date of conception and see if she is in danger. She agrees and is informed that the baby is Jin's instead of Lee's, leaving her overjoyed. Juliet secretly leaves a tape behind informing Ben of what transpired and that she will reluctantly take "samples" from other women. Mikhail, who has survived the fence, comes across Desmond's group and the heavily injured parachutist, Naomi Dorrit. He treats her wound and they reluctantly let him go. When she wakes, she informs Hurley that Flight 815's wreckage was already found and all of the passengers were confirmed dead.
68	19	"The Brig"	Eric Laneuville	Damon Lindelof & Carlton Cuse	Locke	May 2, 2007	12.33
Ben orders Locke to kill Cooper as part of his initiation, which he is unable to do. Richard gives him Sawyer's file and Ben warns Locke not to join them without Cooper's dead body, while he plans to kidnap the pregnant survivors. In the present, Desmond's group, mistrustful of Jack, take Naomi to Sayid. She explains that she was hired by Penny to find Desmond and a freighter is waiting offshore for her signal. Sayid fixes her radio, but finds the signal blocked. Locke returns and takes Sawyer to the Black Rock, locking him in a room with Cooper, who he realizes is the real "Sawyer". (Note: A reference to "Confidence Man", where Sawyer reveals that he got his alias from a con man responsible for the death of his parents, and that he carries a letter addressed to the man at all times.) He forces Cooper to read his letter, but when he tears it up, Sawyer kills him. Locke gives him the tape Juliet made for Ben, and when asked if he was paraplegic before the crash, Locke replies "Not anymore" and leaves with the body.
69	20	"The Man Behind the Curtain"	Bobby Roth	Elizabeth Sarnoff & Drew Goddard	Ben	May 9, 2007	12.11
Ben's mother dies giving birth to him. Horace Goodspeed, a man Ben's father Roger met during the incident, invites him to the island to work for DHARMA, who are constantly besieged by the island natives. Ben follows a vision of his mother into the jungle and meets the unaged Richard. Twenty years later, he and Roger take a van out for his birthday, but Ben kills him, abandons the van in the jungle, and returns to find the rest of the DHARMA people gassed by the natives in a concerted operation. In the present, Sawyer confronts Juliet, who explains that she told Jack about Ben's plan and is on the camp's side. Ben tells Locke that the Others follow a man named "Jacob" and complies with Locke's demand to meet him. He takes Locke to a cabin where he speaks to Jacob, whom Locke cannot see, though he hears him say "Help me." Ben takes Locke to the mass grave of the DHARMA purge and shoots him, leaving him to die after Locke repeats what Jacob said to him.
70	21	"Greatest Hits"	Stephen Williams	Edward Kitsis & Adam Horowitz	Charlie	May 16, 2007	12.32
Charlie recalls the five best moments of his life, involving his band, his family, saving Nadia Jaseem (Note: Sayid's love interest, first seen in "Solitary".) from being mugged, and meeting Claire. Alex learns that Ben plans to attack a day early and has Karl warn the survivors. They plan to hide dynamite near the tents and have Sayid, Jin, and Bernard Nadler detonate it with gunfire when the Others arrive. Juliet explains that Naomi's radio is being blocked by the abandoned Looking Glass station, and Charlie, having learned from Desmond that he will die after shutting off the blocking signal, volunteers to go. He records his best moments and asks Desmond to give it to Claire as they take a boat to the Looking Glass, knocking Desmond out when he tries to take Charlie's place. Charlie infiltrates the station, only to be held at gunpoint by a pair of Others.
71	22	"Through the Looking Glass"	Jack Bender	Carlton Cuse & Damon Lindelof	Jack	May 23, 2007	13.86
72	23	"Through the Looking Glass"	Jack Bender	Carlton Cuse & Damon Lindelof	Jack	May 23, 2007	13.86
A suicidal Jack attends a funeral for an unknown person. In the present, Locke decides to commit suicide but is stopped by a vision of Walt. Desmond goes after Charlie while being pursued by Mikhail, who kills the Looking Glass's guards on Ben's orders. He is shot by Desmond while Charlie turns off the signal and makes contact with Penny, who does not know Naomi. Mikhail kills himself with a grenade to flood the station and Charlie seals the control room, writing "NOT PENNY'S BOAT" on his hand and showing it to Desmond before drowning. Sayid's group kill some of the attackers but are captured. Hurley rescues them using Roger's van and Sawyer kills Tom. After learning that Alex helped them, Ben tells Richard to take the Others to "the temple" and takes her to intercept Jack's group, who are turning off Rousseau's distress call. She is reunited with her mother when they arrive, and Jack brutalizes Ben despite his claim that Naomi is there to kill them. They turn off the call, but before Naomi can call her boat, Locke appears and stabs her, though Jack calls them anyway. Some time later, Kate reluctantly meets with Jack, revealing his story to be in the future. Jack insists that they need to return to the island.

== Home media release ==
Lost: The Complete Third Season – The Unexplored Experience
Set details			Special features	
23 episodes; 7-disc set/6 Blu-ray Discs; 1.78:1 aspect ratio; Subtitles: English, Spanish & French; English (Dolby Digital 5.1 Surround) – DVD; English (PCM 5.1 Surround), Spanish (Dolby Digital 2.0 Surround) – Blu-ray; Audio Commentaries; Runtime: 991 minutes			Audio commentaries on: "A Tale of Two Cities" by Damon Lindelof and Elizabeth Mitchell; "I Do" by Carlton Cuse, Evangeline Lilly and Josh Holloway; "Exposé" by Edward Kitsis and Adam Horowitz; "The Man Behind the Curtain" by Damon Lindelof, Carlton Cuse and Michael Emerson; "The World of the Others"; "The Lost Flashbacks"; "Lost in a Day"; "Lost on Location"; "The Lost Book Club"; Deleted scenes; Bloopers; Cast in Clay: Creating the Toys of Todd McFarlane; Terry O'Quinn: Throwing from the Handle; Crew Tribute with Evangeline Lilly; The Next Level: Inside the Video Game; Easter Eggs; Blu-ray exclusives: Access Granted: Rethink what you know about the show with an interactive panel that unlocks answers to your most pressing Lost questions; Blu-Prints: Take a guided tour of the island through never before seen blu-prints	
Release dates
Mexico; Brazil	United States; Canada	Australia	Japan	United Kingdom
September 26, 2007	December 11, 2007	October 17, 2007	February 20, 2008	October 22, 2007
