= Richard Alpert (Lost) =

Fictional character of the TV series Lost

- Lost character
- Néstor Carbonell as Richard Franklin Alpert
- First appearance: "Not in Portland"
- Last appearance: "The End"
- Created by: J. J. Abrams; Damon Lindelof
- Portrayed by: Néstor Carbonell
- Centric episode(s): "Ab Aeterno"

In-universe information
- Full name: Ricardo (surname unknown)
- Aliases: Richard Franklin Alpert, Ricardus
- Species: Human
- Occupation: Advisor to the Others; Farmer; Slave
- Nationality: Spanish
- Former residence: Tenerife, Canary Islands, Spain

Richard Franklin Alpert is a fictional character played by Néstor Carbonell in the American ABC television series Lost. Alpert is introduced in the third season, specifically in a flashback of the character Juliet Burke (Elizabeth Mitchell), where he claims to be a doctor for a bioscience company called Mittelos Bioscience; he is later revealed to be a member of a native island faction called the Others, where he plays a role in the group's hierarchy that has been compared to that of the Panchen Lama in Buddhism by the series' producers.

A major mystery behind his character was his agelessness; from the third through fifth seasons, Alpert appears both in the present day and in several flashbacks dating to the 1950s, 70s and 80s; in all the different time periods, Richard always appears to be a man in his mid-40s, not having appeared to have aged at all. The nature of his agelessness and his true age is revealed in the season six episode "Ab Aeterno"; in the 1860s, Alpert was a prisoner on the Black Rock when it crashed on the Island. After meeting the true leader of the Others (Jacob), he made Richard ageless in exchange for his loyalty. At the end of the series, following the deaths of Jacob and the Man in Black, Richard becomes mortal.

Originally introduced as a guest star in the third-season episode "Not in Portland", Alpert reappears throughout the third season, both in flashbacks and present-day island events. In the spring of 2007, shortly before the conclusion of Lost's third season, Carbonell was contracted as a regular on the CBS television series Cane, which jeopardized his future on Lost. Nevertheless, the 2007–2008 Writers Guild of America strike resulted in Cane being cancelled and allowed Carbonell to return for the final three episodes of the fourth season and several in the fifth.

== Character biography ==
In 1867, Richard Franklin Alpert was a Spaniard known as Ricardo who lived in the Canary Islands with his wife, Isabella, who was dying from tuberculosis. Richard promised to save her and rode out to the home of the nearest doctor in the midst of a heavy rainfall. The doctor claimed to have medicine which could help her, but Richard could not afford it and was refused aid. He grew desperate and pleaded with the doctor, who wound up getting accidentally knocked back and hitting his head on the table, killing him instantly. Richard took the medicine and rushed back to Isabella, only to find her dead. He was then arrested for murder and sentenced to be hanged. When the time came for his execution, Father Suarez, a priest, sold him to Magnus Hanso, who was setting out to the New World.

Richard, now a slave, was chained below the deck of the Black Rock, which got caught in a bad storm and shipwrecked on the Island, colliding with the four-toed statue of Tawaret in the process. The other surviving slaves were executed by Jonas Whitfield, an officer of the ship. Before Richard could be killed, the Smoke Monster arrived and killed all except him. As he worked to free himself, a vision of his wife appeared and told him they were in Hell. She was then apparently killed by the Monster as well. Still in chains below deck, Richard was visited by the Man in Black (Titus Welliver), the Smoke Monster in human form. The Man in Black freed him on the condition Alpert would help him.

The Man in Black told Richard they are in Hell and he must kill Jacob (Mark Pellegrino), whom he referred to as the devil, in order to get his wife back. The Man in Black gave him a dagger and sent him off to kill Jacob, who lived at the foot of the statue. When Richard arrived, he was attacked by Jacob himself. Richard then told Jacob that he tried to kill him because he had been persuaded that Jacob was the devil and that he had Richard's wife. Jacob then convinced Richard that he is still alive and not in hell by continuously submerging his head underwater until Richard admitted he would drown and die if Jacob did not stop. Jacob explained to Richard how the Island is like a cork in a wine bottle, keeping the Evil contained. The Man in Black thinks humanity was evil and corrupt, while Jacob wants to prove to the Man in Black that humans can do good and was bringing people to the island to contradict his belief. Richard points out that Jacob's policy of non-intervention leaves a vacuum the Man in Black is very willing to take advantage of. This convinces Jacob to give Richard a job as his sole intermediary between him (Jacob) and the people coming to the Island in the future. In exchange, Jacob granted Richard immortality, after stating he was unable to bring Isabella back from the dead or absolve Richard of his sins.

Richard returned to the Man in Black and told him he was joining Jacob. The Man in Black informed Richard he found Isabella's cross on the ship. Richard took it, and after crying buried it at the base of a tree.

Alpert is next seen in 1954, in the episode "Jughead", where he leads a group of Others who have recently killed a detachment of eighteen US soldiers who landed on the island with a hydrogen bomb. Alpert first asked the troops to leave peacefully, but was "forced" to kill them when they refused. He hints he was ordered by someone higher in his chain of command.

The Others captured Daniel Faraday (Jeremy Davies), Miles Straume (Ken Leung) and Charlotte Lewis (Rebecca Mader) in the jungle after their third skip through time to 1954, a result of the island having been moved in "There's No Place Like Home". Alpert was under the mistaken impression the three were sent by the military to retrieve the bomb; Faraday played along in order to gain access to the bomb and repair a crack in the casing. Alpert reluctantly allowed Faraday to see the bomb after Faraday professed his love for Charlotte as a way of proving he does not intend to detonate it. As Faraday worked, John Locke (Terry O'Quinn) walked into the camp, having followed a young Charles Widmore (younger, Tom Connolly; older, Alan Dale) to their location. Locke attempts to continue a conversation he began with Alpert in the future, but was met with skepticism. His mention of Jacob, the Others' leader, and the compass given to him in the future by Alpert himself (an ontological paradox), convinced Alpert to at least hear him out. He told a reluctant Alpert if he was suspicious of Locke's claims of time travel, Alpert should visit Locke's birthplace in two years for proof. Locke was unable to convince Alpert to tell him how to leave the island before another time skip occurs.

Alpert took Locke's advice and visited the newborn Locke two years later on May 30, 1956, in the episode "Cabin Fever". Five years later, he visited a five-year-old Locke, giving him a test not unlike those administered by the Panchen Lama to Dalai Lama potentials, under the guise he was recruiting children for a special school. He showed Locke several items, including the compass, and asked Locke to identify which items belonged to him. Along with several other items, Locke picked a knife; angered by Locke's failure, Alpert left in a hurry, claiming Locke was "not ready" for his school. Alpert tried to recruit Locke again in the 1970s, this time into an internship program with Mittelos Laboratories in Portland, Oregon, but a teenage Locke turned it down.

In 1973, in "The Man Behind the Curtain", Alpert encountered a young Benjamin Linus (younger, Sterling Beaumon; older, Michael Emerson) in the jungle. Ben expressed a desire to run away from his father, a member of the scientific research group called the Dharma Initiative, and join the Others. Alpert realized Ben is special when Ben mentioned seeing his deceased mother (Carrie Preston) in the jungle. He agreed to Ben's request, but told Ben it will require time and patience.

In 1974, Richard entered the Dharma Initiative's barracks in "LaFleur" and demanded the whereabouts of two members of his people, they having been killed and buried by Juliet Burke (Elizabeth Mitchell) and James "Sawyer" Ford (Josh Holloway) following Locke's successful attempt to stop the time skips. Sawyer managed to appease Richard by taking responsibility and revealing knowledge of Alpert's encounter with Locke in the 1950s. In 1977, Richard again encountered Sawyer in the jungle in "Whatever Happened, Happened", this time with Kate Austen (Evangeline Lilly) and a wounded Ben Linus, whom they wanted healed. He warned Sawyer and Kate by saving Ben's life, Ben won't retain any memory of the event and will lose his innocence. Sawyer and Kate acknowledged this and Richard took Ben to the temple. Shortly after this exchange, Alpert tells several of the Others he did not answer to Charles Widmore or to Ellie (Alice Evans), then leader of the Others. Regardless, he was briefly berated by a middle-aged Charles Widmore (David S. Lee) in "Dead is Dead" for bringing Ben to the camp.

Later on, he had another encounter with Daniel Faraday in "The Variable", who frantically demanded to see Ellie and the bomb he told their people to bury. Ellie shot Daniel in the back, much to Alpert's displeasure, and he listened as Daniel explained to Ellie she was his mother. Ellie was convinced Daniel was telling the truth, and Alpert joined her, Jack Shephard (Matthew Fox), and later, Sayid Jarrah (Naveen Andrews) in retrieving the hydrogen bomb in "Follow the Leader". During this mission, Richard confided in Jack he has been keeping tabs on John Locke and "he is not that special". Jack insists Richard have faith in Locke.

In 1988, Alpert observed the tensions between Charles Widmore and Ben Linus in "Dead is Dead" when Ben was given the order to kill Danielle Rousseau; Ben spared her and instead stole her child, Alex. Alpert said nothing in this exchange. As an adult in the early 1990s, Ben assisted Alpert in killing the members of the Dharma Initiative with poison gas in "The Man Behind the Curtain". After the purge, in 1992, Richard consorted with Ben in banishing Charles Widmore.

In 2001, Alpert attempted to recruit Juliet into Mittelos Bioscience in "Not in Portland". Juliet initially declined the offer, offhandedly joking the only way she could go is if her employer, her ex-husband, were hit by a bus; Alpert saw to it that this "joke" became reality in short order. Alpert claimed to have forgotten Juliet's joke when she mentioned it later, and she accepted the job offer. Alpert then admitted the company is not really in Portland, and Juliet was taken to the island. Three years later, when Oceanic Airlines flight 815 crashed on the island, Alpert was in Miami, Florida, filming Juliet's formerly cancer-stricken sister playing with her young son, footage Ben showed to Juliet in "One of Us".

Alpert encountered Locke once again, in 2004, when the latter infiltrated the Barracks, now the Others' community, in "The Man from Tallahassee". Locke destroyed their submarine to prevent Jack and Juliet from leaving the island and was captured. At Ben's request, Alpert fetched Anthony Cooper (Kevin Tighe), Locke's father. Ben arranged for Locke to kill Cooper in front of the Others as his initiation in "The Brig", knowing Locke would not be able to do so. Locke was thus publicly humiliated when he refused. The next day, Alpert hinted to Locke that he was unhappy with Ben's leadership and informed him Sawyer had a connection to Cooper which would make him kill the latter, Cooper having been the man whose con inspired the murder/suicide of his parents. Alpert was then instructed by Ben to take the Others to "the Temple," a safe haven, while Ben negotiated with the Flight 815 survivors in "Through the Looking Glass".

After Ben was taken into custody by Martin Keamy (Kevin Durand) and the mercenary team sent to the island by Charles Widmore, Alpert captured Kate and Sayid to enlist their aid in retrieving him in part 1 of "There's No Place Like Home". In part 2, Ben was rescued and Keamy was shot several times by Alpert; Keamy's bulletproof vest saved his life. Once Ben ventured to the Dharma station called the Orchid and moved the island, time began skipping for the survivors while Alpert and the Others remained in the present.

During one skip, in "Because You Left", Alpert tracked down Locke, who had been wounded in the last skip, and treated a bullet hole in his leg. He gave Locke the compass which Locke would give Alpert himself in 1954, and told Locke the only way to save the island was to get the Oceanic Six, the six survivors who left the island, to return. When Locke asked how he could do this, Alpert responded Locke would have to die. In "Follow the Leader", the Man in Black (using Locke's form) is revealed to have directed Alpert to do this. At the Others' camp, Sun-Hwa Kwon (Yunjin Kim) asked Alpert if he remembered the survivors trapped in the past. He confirms he did, and says he watched them die.

Locke convinced Alpert to take him and the Others present (a second group remains at the Temple) to see Jacob. Alpert expressed displeasure at Locke's style of command, which Ben pointed out was why he tried to kill Locke. Richard led them to the broken base of the statue, within which was Jacob's home. Locke went in with Ben despite Richard's statement only the current leader was allowed to request an audience. As Ben and Locke spoke with Jacob, Ilana (Zuleikha Robinson) and her group arrived at the camp. She addressed Richard as "Ricardus" and asked him, "What lies in the shadow of the statue?" He replied, "Ille qui nos omnes servabit" (Latin for "He who will save us all."). She opened the crate her people brought with her, revealing Locke's dead body; the man visiting Jacob was an impostor.

When Ben emerged from the statue claiming "John" wanted to speak to Richard, Richard furiously threw Ben to the ground in front of Locke's corpse. Later, Richard was shocked when The Man in Black, in the form of Locke, exited the statue and said to Richard it was good to see him out of his chains. At this statement, Richard realized who he was facing: the man who conned him 140 years ago. But The Man in Black, in the form of Locke, knocked Richard unconscious, picked him up, and walked away.

The Man in Black later cut down Richard from a sack he had hung him from in a tree, and promptly apologized for it. Richard asked the Man in Black why he looks like John Locke, to which MIB replied Locke was a candidate. Richard expressed he doesn't know what a candidate was, to which the Man in Black was surprised. He asked Richard to come with him, but Richard refused.

Later, after the Man in Black chased after a blond boy, Sawyer met Richard in a clearing. Richard urgently tried to encourage Sawyer to come with him to the Temple, but Sawyer insisted on staying with the Man in Black. Richard tried to convince him further, but when he heard the Man in Black appearing, he ran off, frightened. He later visited the Temple, realizing everybody there was dead.

While Jack and Hurley (Jorge Garcia) walked through the jungle in hopes of returning to the Temple, Richard suddenly appeared, convincing them he knew where the Temple was. He eventually leads them to the Black Rock, admitting he came to the Island with it. When Hurley admits he was talking to Jacob, Richard, angered at Jacob, told Hurley not to listen to him. Upon entering, Richard saw the chains he was once in, and picked a stick of dynamite, having become suicidal after Jacob's death. Hurley then warned him about the unstable dynamite, even referencing another survivor who died by the dynamite. Richard claimed he wanted to die because he was touched by Jacob, who claimed everything happens for a reason, and his life was a lie and had no purpose now that Jacob was dead. Jack lit the dynamite and Hurley fled. Jack then talked Richard into believing Richard still had a purpose and he wouldn't let him die just yet. At that moment, the dynamite did not explode. After that, Jack, Hurley and Richard headed for the beach camp, where they found Ilana, Sun, Ben, Miles and Frank (Jeff Fahey).

Later, Ilana stated Jacob told her to follow Richard's lead. Richard, though, says he didn't know what to do, but instead he was going to follow another, referring to the Man in Black. He ran off through the jungle, to the place where he buried his wife's cross. Hurley followed him, informing him his wife, Isabella, said Richard has to stop the Man in Black from leaving the island, or they "are all going to Hell".

Against Hurley's advice, Richard, Miles and Ben go off to another part of the island when Hurley insists they have to trust him with following Jacob's wishes. When they go to the Dharma Initiative's barracks, they are told by Charles Widmore the Man in Black is coming for them. Richard and Ben go to talk with the Man in Black, who surfaces as the Smoke Monster and hurls Richard from the Dharma. Miles later finds Richard, as well as a grey hair on his head. Now seeing that he can somehow age again, he regains his will to live. On their way to Hydra Island, the two find Lapidus floating out in the water. Together they repair the Ajira plane. Once the Ajira plane is made airworthy, Lapidus, Miles, Richard, Sawyer, Kate and Claire are seen to fly safely off of the Island by a dying Jack. Ostensibly, Richard leaves the island and survives.

== Characteristics ==
The mysteries surrounding his ageless character were heavily discussed among the fan community. Although being present in scenes from the 1860s to the 2000s, Richard does not appear to age. In "The Man Behind the Curtain" Ben says "You do remember birthdays, don't you?" to Richard. When asked at the 2008 Comic-Con International how old Richard is, lead Lost actor Matthew Fox guessed 125, which Lost producer Damon Lindelof said was wrong. When Locke asks Juliet how old Richard is in "Jughead", she simply replies "old". In "Follow the Leader", Ben describes Richard as an advisor "who has had that position for a long, long time." In "Dr. Linus", Richard mentions he doesn't age because Jacob touched him. In "Ab Aeterno" it is revealed Richard lived in 1867, being around 35 years old. Since the current storyline takes place in 2007, that makes Richard around 175 years old.

== Development ==
Richard shares his name with Richard Alpert, former Harvard psychology professor and Eastern-influenced author and figure from the 1960s and 70s, now known as Ram Dass. Lost producer Damon Lindelof confirmed Richard is named after someone famous, but did not elaborate. Néstor Carbonell was originally contracted to guest star in "Not in Portland", with the possibility of the role becoming recurring. After the producers enjoyed his performance, his contract was extended to five further appearances in season three. During production of "The Man Behind the Curtain", Carbonell shot the pilot for CBS drama Cane.

While producing the final episodes of the third season, Carbonell was cast in a starring role on the new CBS series Cane. The writers modified their original story plan for the fourth season in anticipation for Carbonell's potential unavailability. Despite Carbonell's willingness to return to Lost, CBS president Nina Tassler ruled out another Lost guest appearance. Cane was canceled during the 2007–2008 Writers Guild of America strike, freeing Carbonell from his contract with CBS. Executive producer Carlton Cuse cited this as an unintended positive consequence of the strike.

== Reception ==
When Richard made his first appearance, Erin Martell of AOL's TV Squad was disappointed Carbonell did not use the accent he used in Suddenly Susan. Entertainment Weekly's Jeff Jensen was pleased when Richard returned in "One of Us", saying "[Carbonell's] Slick Willy performance as Mittelos exec Richard Alpert is on par with his superb embodiment of the half-bat, half-lothario superhero known as Batmanuel in the gone-too-soon sitcom The Tick". He also "loved [Richard's] matter-of-fact way of telling Juliet he had spiked her orange juice with a massive amount of tranquilizer ... his silver-tongued temptation was so persuasive, I think any of us would have gulped down that [orange juice]". Chris Carabott from IGN thought Richard featuring in Ben's flashback as a Hostile was "one of the more surprising revelations of "The Man Behind the Curtain" because Alpert doesn't seem to have aged a day in thirty-plus years".

Many reviewers were pleased when Richard returned in season four's "Cabin Fever" after being absent for ten episodes. Jay Glatfelter of The Huffington Post called him a "fan favorite" and speculated that although it is less plausible his appearance at Locke's birth is due to time travel, this seemed more believable than Richard not aging. This proved untrue, as Locke visited him 2 years prior, telling Richard of his (Locke's) birth in "Jughead." Carabott called it "The biggest and most welcome surprise" because "He's one of the most enigmatic characters on the series and his appearance in Locke's past is an exciting and shocking revelation." Maureen Ryan of the Chicago Tribune said "I get absurdly excited every time Richard Franklin Alpert (the wonderfully spooky Nestor Carbonell) arrives on the scene. I just know he’s going to bust out some major-league Dharma Initiative goodness one of these days, and his mere presence boosted my enjoyment level of an already good episode." Cynthia Littleton from Variety said "Just the sight of Richard puts me on edge. Actor Nestor Carbonell is fantastic."
