= Juliet Burke =

Fictional character of the TV series Lost

- Lost character
- Elizabeth Mitchell as Juliet Burke
- First appearance: "A Tale of Two Cities"; October 4, 2006
- Last appearance: "The End"; May 23, 2010
- Created by: J. J. Abrams; Damon Lindelof
- Portrayed by: Elizabeth Mitchell; Rylee Fansler (child)
- Centric episode(s): Individual: "Not in Portland" "One of Us" "The Other Woman"; Shared: "A Tale of Two Cities" "The Incident, Part 2" "The End"

In-universe information
- Species: Human
- Gender: Female
- Occupation: Fertility doctor and OB/GYN, Miami Central University; Auto mechanic, Dharma Initiative
- Relatives: Rachel Carlson (sister); Julian Carlson (nephew)
- Nationality: American
- Former residence: Miami, Florida, United States

Dr. Juliet Burke is a fictional character portrayed by Elizabeth Mitchell on the ABC television series Lost. Created by J. J. Abrams and Damon Lindelof, the character was introduced in the third season as a member of the hostile group referred to as "the Others" by the crash survivors of Oceanic Flight 815. Flashbacks reveal Juliet's past as a research specialist recruited to solve the Island's fertility problem causing pregnant women to die after conception. Prevented from leaving the Island and seeing her sister again by Ben Linus until she finds a solution, she quickly betrays Ben and the Others when she is sent as a spy to the survivors' camp. Juliet initially grows close to the castaways' leader, Jack Shephard, but ultimately falls in love and forms a relationship with James "Sawyer" Ford, with whom she moves on to the afterlife in the series finale. The character has also appeared in several spin-off webisodes of Lost: Missing Pieces, with Mitchell reprising her role.

Both the character and Mitchell's performance have received significant praise from critics and fans. Mitchell was nominated for the Primetime Emmy Award for Outstanding Guest Actress in a Drama Series in 2010.

== Character biography ==
As a child, Juliet Carlson is devastated to learn her parents (Michael Trisler and Amy Stewart) are getting a divorce; her mother explains that although they love each other, they are not meant to be together. Juliet grows up to become a fertility doctor living in Miami, Florida, with her sister Rachel Carlson (Robin Weigert). Under her married name of Juliet Burke, she works for her ex-husband Edmund Burke (Željko Ivanek) as a researcher at Miami Central University. She performs unauthorised experiments attempting to restore Rachel's fertility, as her reproductive system has been ravaged by chemotherapy and rendered sterile. Juliet even manages to impregnate a male mouse during a test trial, though it does not carry to term.

In 2001, Juliet is approached by Richard Alpert (Néstor Carbonell) of Mittelos Bioscience who offers her a job in Portland, Oregon. Stating that Edmund would never allow her to leave the university, Juliet sarcastically jokes she would only be able to accept the offer "if he were hit by a bus". Juliet learns from Rachel that her experiments worked as she is finally pregnant. As she informs Edmund that she does not want the news published to maintain Rachel's privacy, he is hit and killed by a bus. Richard and Ethan Rom (William Mapother) show up at the morgue to offer Juliet another chance to accept the job to which she agrees, believing it would only last six months somewhere "not quite in Portland." Soon after, Rachel's cancer goes into remission. As Juliet prepares for departure, Richard asks her to drink orange juice mixed with tranquilizer, stating it would be best if she is asleep for the journey. She expresses her reservations but Richard assures her that her miraculous impregnation of Rachel against all odds is just the start of what she can accomplish and promises she will see things beyond her comprehension. Tempted by her curiosity, Juliet drinks the juice and promptly falls unconscious.

=== Arrival on the Island ===
Juliet awakens aboard Galaga submarine. Ethan helps her up and she disembarks onto a pier where she is greeted by Benjamin "Ben" Linus (Michael Emerson), the leader of "the Others", who welcomes her to the Island. Juliet is presented with her own newly furnished house at the Others' Barracks, and also begins having therapy sessions with Dr. Harper Stanhope (Andrea Roth). In September 2001, after the six months on the Island that she agreed to passes, Juliet tells Ben the fertility problem causing pregnant women to die occurs during conception. Juliet reasons there is nothing more she can do and asks to go home, but Ben informs her that Rachel's cancer has returned and promises to cure it if she stays on the Island to continue her work.

For the next three years, Juliet's test subjects experience uniformly fatal results. At some point, Juliet begins having an affair with Harper's estranged husband, Goodwin Stanhope (Brett Cullen). Harper discovers this and warns Juliet that should her relationship with Goodwin not come to an end immediately, they will face dire consequences from Ben, alluding to the latter's jealous romantic affections for Juliet. Juliet becomes suspicious of Ben when she notices a spinal tumor on his x-rays; since Ben is diagnosed with cancer, she becomes convinced that he lied about being able to cure Rachel. Enraged, Juliet confronts him over his apparent deception and tearfully asks to leave the Island but Ben refuses, generating hostility. The next day, a distraught Juliet prepares to host a book club at her house when she is visited by Amelia (Julie Adams). Juliet prepares to show her Ben's x-rays but the rest of the club arrives. While discussing the novel Carrie, Juliet and the Others witness Oceanic Flight 815 crashing on the Island on September 22, 2004.

=== Following the crash ===
Immediately after the plane crashes, Ben dispatches Goodwin and Ethan to infiltrate the survivors; it soon becomes apparent that Ben sent Goodwin away out of jealousy for Juliet's affections. At the Flame station, Mikhail Bakunin (Andrew Divoff) shows Juliet live footage of a cancer-free Rachel with her two-year-old son, Julian, presumably named after her. Juliet breaks down into tears and unsuccessfully pleads with Ben to let her go home to her family. Weeks later, Juliet is invited to Ben's house for a dinner party only to discover that Ben has arranged a private date. Juliet asks about Goodwin and Ben attempts to sow discord between the two by implying that Goodwin is romantically interested in Ana Lucia Cortez (Michelle Rodriguez). After a few days, Juliet is led by Ben to Goodwin's impaled corpse after he was killed by Ana Lucia. Juliet accuses Ben of orchestrating Goodwin's death, causing Ben to reveal his jealous obsession with her by angrily claiming, "You're mine." A distressed Juliet is left mourning over Goodwin's body.

Juliet and Ben later watch footage of the crash survivors from the Pearl station's surveillance monitors. Ben reveals his intention to kidnap and "persuade" them into helping him. Juliet and Ben depart shortly after, inadvertently leaving behind a walkie-talkie which is picked up by Paulo (Rodrigo Santoro). Juliet helps take care of the young crash survivors that are kidnapped by the Others, including Zack (Mickey Graue) and Emma (Kiersten Havelock). After they abduct Walt Lloyd (Malcolm David Kelley) and keep him in "Room 23", Juliet supervises him and realizes he is "dangerous", noting the pile of dead birds outside his cell. The Others later manage to capture Walt's father, Michael Dawson (Harold Perrineau). Juliet visits Michael and informs him that the Others have agreed to give him a boat in exchange for his help in freeing Ben, who has been caught by the survivors. Juliet comments that Walt is "special" and should be taken away from the Island as soon as possible.

==== Season 3 ====
Juliet is assigned to watch and interrogate Jack Shephard (Matthew Fox), who has been captured by the Others and held in the underwater section of the Hydra station, located on a small island two miles offshore from the main Island. Jack initially refuses to cooperate but Juliet ultimately manages to break through and the two grow closer. She later seeks Jack's help in operating on Colleen Pickett (Paula Malcomson) when she is shot, though the surgery proves unsuccessful. In the operating room, Jack notices Ben's x-rays on the wall and deduces that he was kidnapped to remove his tumor. Juliet is sent to convince Jack to operate on Ben, but she surreptitiously plays a video of herself using cue cards telling Jack to kill Ben during the surgery and to make it look like an accident. Jack agrees to do the surgery but ends up slitting Ben's kidney sac to blackmail the Others into letting James "Sawyer" Ford (Josh Holloway) and Kate Austen (Evangeline Lilly) go. In an attempt to force Jack to play his role in her scheme to kill Ben, Juliet threatens to have Sawyer and Kate killed, after which Jack reveals Juliet's treachery to the Others. Ben wakes up during the surgery and concedes to Jack's demands, privately asking Juliet to help Sawyer and Kate escape in exchange for her freedom and finally letting her off the Island. She finds Sawyer and Kate held at gunpoint by Danny Pickett (Michael Bowen), whom she shoots and kills on the spot before helping the two escape from Hydra Island back to the main Island.

Juliet is then imprisoned and tried as the Others prepare to sentence her to death for her crime. However, Jack vouches for her and makes a deal with Ben to spare her. Juliet is marked on her lower back as punishment, and her wound is treated by Jack with an aloe vera plant before they set sail with the Others back to the Barracks on the main Island. As part of their deal, Ben "allows" Juliet and Jack to use the Others' submarine to finally leave the Island but before they can depart, John Locke (Terry O'Quinn) is subtly manipulated by Ben into destroying the submarine with explosives. Prevented from leaving the Island once more, Juliet is asked by Ben to infiltrate the survivors' camp, gain their trust and mark the tents of their pregnant women so the Others can kidnap them. Juliet handcuffs herself to Kate in the jungle, where she pretends to have been gassed and abandoned with her. When "the Monster" chases them, Juliet unlocks the handcuffs and activates the Others' sonar fence to repel it. She and Kate then reunite with Jack and Sayid Jarrah (Naveen Andrews) at the Barracks, and they make their way back to the castaways' beach camp. Sayid, Sawyer and the rest of the survivors are quick to express their skepticism and suspicions of Juliet but Jack declares her under his "protection". The Others activate an implant they previously placed in Claire Littleton (Emilie de Ravin), allowing Juliet to help her by offering a prepared solution, thereby gaining the survivors' trust and respect.

Juliet and Jack grow closer after she joins the survivors on the beach. Upon learning that Sun-Hwa Kwon (Yunjin Kim) is pregnant, she takes her to the Staff station to perform an ultrasound; Juliet confirms that Sun conceived on the Island, giving the latter two months left to live until her second trimester. That night, Juliet commits to betraying the Others and siding with the survivors, confessing everything to Jack about the Others' plans for the pregnant women in the camp. After Kate informs Jack and Juliet of Naomi Dorrit's (Marsha Thomason) arrival on the Island, the two abruptly venture off into the jungle to find Danielle Rousseau (Mira Furlan) and form a plan to resist the Others using Juliet's inside knowledge of their methods. They return to discover Sawyer and Sayid outing Juliet as a mole for the Others with intelligence provided by Locke while he was at Ben's camp. Juliet, Jack and Rousseau then let the rest of the survivors in on their plan: Juliet would falsely mark the empty tents of the pregnant women and when the Others arrive to kidnap them, a trap would be activated with the dynamite they retrieved from the Black Rock to kill the Others. When Karl Martin (Blake Bashoff) warns of the Others' early arrival at the behest of Alex Rousseau (Tania Raymonde), the survivors move up their schedule and divide into three groups: Sayid, Jin-Soo Kwon (Daniel Dae Kim) and Bernard Nadler (Sam Anderson) remain at the beach camp to spring the trap; Charlie Pace (Dominic Monaghan) and Desmond Hume (Henry Ian Cusick) follow Juliet's instructions to breach the Looking Glass station and disable its signal jammer; and Jack and Juliet lead the rest of the group to the Island's radio tower in hopes of using Naomi's satellite phone to call for rescue. When Sayid's part of the plan backfires, Juliet gives Jack a kiss and joins Sawyer in rescuing their captured allies on the beach. After Hugo "Hurley" Reyes (Jorge Garcia) causes a distraction that results in the deaths of the remaining Others, Juliet subdues Tom Friendly (M.C. Gainey) and Sawyer kills him for kidnapping Walt.

==== Season 4 ====
Juliet and the survivors on the beach reunite with Desmond who reveals that before Charlie died, he warned that Naomi and her crew on the Kahana freighter are not on the Island to rescue the castaways. All of the survivors rendezvous in the jungle and fracture into two groups: Jack's camp heads back to the beach to negotiate rescue with the freighter; while Locke, believing that those arriving on the Island intend to do them harm, leads his faction to the Others' former Barracks. Juliet remains on Jack's side. She and Sayid express their distrust of the newcomers and track Jack down in the jungle, where he and Kate are being held at gunpoint by two of the Kahana's science team, Daniel Faraday (Jeremy Davies) and Miles Straume (Ken Leung). Juliet and Sayid subdue and force them to reveal the location of their helicopter. When she treats the head wound of the pilot, Frank Lapidus (Jeff Fahey), he realizes her name was not on the manifest of Oceanic Flight 815 and asks her where Ben is. Juliet brings Desmond to the copter so that he and Sayid can head to the Kahana so as to determine its crew's true motives.

Juliet returns to the beach camp with Jack, Daniel and Charlotte Lewis (Rebecca Mader). They dial the emergency number of the newcomers' satellite phone to contact the Kahana and are informed by the freighter crew that the copter has not yet made it to them. Juliet and Jack grow more suspicious of Daniel and Charlotte after receiving a mysteriously delayed call from Sayid, and Daniel is pressured into revealing that time flows in a different manner to and from the Island. When Daniel and Charlotte disappear without notice, Juliet and Jack head into the forest to search for them. Juliet is confronted by Harper — her former therapist — on the behalf of Ben, who warns that Daniel and Charlotte intend to release a chemical gas at the Tempest station that will kill everyone on the Island. Juliet arrives at the Tempest and subdues Charlotte but Daniel pleads their mission is to render the gas inert to prevent Ben from using it. Juliet believes him and allows him to deactivate the station before reuniting with Jack outside. She informs Jack of Ben's possessive obsession with her and tearfully warns him of the threat Ben poses to those she loves; Jack insists that he is here to stay and kisses Juliet.

Juliet is forced to reveal to Jin that Sun had an affair prior to arriving on the Island when the couple plan to leave the beach camp for the Barracks out of distrust of Daniel and Charlotte; Sun had previously confided this information to Juliet during her ultrasound at the Staff station. Juliet apologises to Sun and successfully sways her and Jin to stay, convincing them that getting on the freighter would be Sun's best option as giving birth on the Island would kill her and their unborn child. When the corpse of freighter doctor Ray (Marc Vann) washes ashore, Juliet and Jack interrogate Daniel who reveals they never intended to rescue anyone on the Island. Jack stumbles in pain and collapses. Juliet diagnoses Jack with appendicitis and operates on him with Bernard's assistance. Following the appendectomy, she reveals to Kate that they kissed but it was only for Jack to prove he "doesn't love someone else." Juliet notes that Jack is awake and had overheard their conversation. As she scolds Jack for walking about when he should be recovering from surgery, the freighter's copter flies over the beach camp and a package is thrown down. In it, the castaways find a satellite phone tracking the chopper. Against Juliet's wishes, Jack decides to follow the phone's signal to the Orchid station. Sayid returns in the Zodiac raft to start ferrying people at the beach camp to the Kahana, revealing that Charles Widmore's (Alan Dale) mercenaries, led by Martin Keamy (Kevin Durand) on the chopper, intend to kill the survivors; Juliet insists that Sun boards the raft first since she is pregnant and tells Daniel she will not leave the Island until everyone is safe aboard the freighter. Sawyer, after having jumped off the copter, arrives on the beach and finds Juliet alone drinking a bottle of rum. She tells Sawyer she is not celebrating and motions to the smoke emanating from the destroyed freighter. The two drink together on the beach before the sky turns purple as a result of Ben using the Orchid station to "move" the Island. Juliet, Sawyer and the entire Island then disappear in a flash of light.

==== Season 5 ====
Juliet and Sawyer meet with Bernard and Rose Nadler (L. Scott Caldwell) who note the beach camp has disappeared. Daniel informs the remaining survivors on the Island that they have been "dislodged" and are "skipping" through time. Juliet discovers the Swan station's hatch still intact but Daniel explains that attempting to alter the past is pointless, reasoning, "Whatever happened, happened." Juliet and Sawyer become the group's new leaders before they are set upon by a rain of fiery arrows from the Others of 1954. The survivors scatter into the jungle where Locke saves Juliet and Sawyer. They find the Others' camp and rescue Daniel, who warns the Others to bury the "Jughead" hydrogen bomb to prevent it from detonating. The castaways are briefly transported to 2004 and a post-2007 time era. They use outrigger canoes to paddle to the Orchid station, where Locke believes he can stop the flashes, and are chased by another boat until they are shifted to 1988. Sawyer tells Juliet he briefly saw Kate in 2004 but didn't approach her because "What's done is done." Juliet's nose starts bleeding, which Daniel states is a temporal effect of how long one has been on the Island. As the time-shifts intensify, Locke hastily descends into the Orchid and moves the frozen wheel causing a particularly violent flash.

Juliet and the survivors find that their nosebleeds and headaches have subsided, causing Daniel to affirm they are now permanently fixed in 1974. Sawyer says they will wait "as long as it takes" for Locke to return. They save a woman named Amy (Reiko Aylesworth), who is held at gunpoint by two Others. Amy leads the survivors back to the Dharma Initiative's Barracks, which have yet to be taken over by the Others during "the Purge". Sawyer fabricates a cover story that his crew was shipwrecked while searching for the Black Rock. Horace Goodspeed (Doug Hutchison) insists that they board the Galaga submarine and leave the Island in the morning but after Sawyer helps him resolve a dispute over Dharma's "truce" with the Others, Horace gives the group two weeks to wait for Locke's return. Juliet, having been kept on the Island by Ben against her will for over three years, expresses her intention to leave despite it being 1974, but Sawyer convinces her to stay for another "two weeks".

Three years later: In 1977, Juliet, Sawyer, Jin, Miles, and Daniel are members of the Dharma Initiative. Remaining on the Island well beyond her initial two-week promise, Juliet works as an auto mechanic while Sawyer serves as head of security under the name "Jim LaFleur"; the pair are in a relationship and share a house at the Barracks.

Juliet is brought out of "retirement" as a fertility doctor when Sawyer asks her to deliver Amy and Horace's baby, marking her first successful delivery on the Island. Jin finds Jack, Kate and Hurley in the jungle. Juliet suggests passing the three off as new Dharma recruits. After Sayid is captured by Stuart Radzinsky (Eric Lange), Juliet expresses her concern to Sawyer that their friends' return will jeopardize their lives at Dharma. Sayid escapes and shoots a young Ben Linus (Sterling Beaumon). Juliet is able to stabilize Ben but not heal him, and she scolds Jack for refusing to help. Agreeing "it's wrong to let a child die" even if he will grow up to cause them harm, Juliet and Sawyer take Ben to the Others, who are able to save his life at the cost of his innocence. Phil (Patrick Fischler) discovers Juliet and Sawyer's actions. When they are interrogated by Radzinsky and Dr. Pierre Chang (François Chau), Sawyer agrees to reveal Jack's location if he and Juliet are allowed off the Island on the Dharma submarine. Sawyer apologises to Juliet for not listening when she wanted to leave three years ago to which she replies, "I'm glad you talked me out of it." Aboard the Galaga, Juliet and Sawyer profess their love and discuss their freedom once they dock in the "real world". However, Kate is placed on the submarine as well and convinces them to return to stop Jack from detonating the Jughead bomb at the Swan station; because the electromagnetic energy at the Swan is what caused the plane crash in 2004, Jack believes destroying it in 1977 will prevent them from ever coming to the Island. Damaged by her parents' divorce, Juliet becomes convinced Sawyer still has feelings for Kate and decides to support Jack's plan, reasoning she won't have to lose Sawyer if she never meets him. When Jack throws the Jughead down the Swan shaft, Juliet is dragged into the breached electromagnetic pocket by loose chains. Sawyer catches her hand and refuses to let go. To avoid pulling Sawyer down the hatch with her, Juliet tells him she loves him and releases her grip. She survives the fall and finds the Jughead next to her. Hoping to prevent any of them from ever arriving on the Island, she uses a rock to strike the device, causing it to explode.

==== Season 6 ====
Juliet and the survivors are thrown forward in time to 2007 after she detonates the Jughead hydrogen bomb; the blast is what caused "the Incident" at the Swan that caused in the plane crash as well as the Island's fertility problems that Juliet was initially recruited to solve, effectively making the survivors the cause of their own arrival on the Island. Still buried under the rubble of the Swan, Juliet cries for help. Sawyer and the survivors hear her and dig her out. When he reaches her, she says, "We should get coffee sometime... we can go Dutch." The two kiss and Juliet succumbs to her injuries before she is able to tell Sawyer something "really, really important", leaving a devastated Sawyer to break down into tears. After they bury Juliet, Sawyer forces Miles to 'read' her; Miles reveals that Juliet's message to him was "It worked." Sawyer returns to his and Juliet's house at the Barracks to recover an engagement ring he had hidden, and tells Kate that he was going to ask Juliet to marry him.

Sawyer later sees Juliet's surname - Burke - crossed out on Jacob's (Mark Pellegrino) wall in the cliffside cave, revealing she was candidate number 58.

===== Flash sideways =====
In the "flash sideways timeline", Dr. Juliet Carlson works as a maternity doctor at St. Sebastian Hospital in Los Angeles, California, alongside Jack, who is her ex-husband. She and Jack have a son named David (Dylan Minnette), who lives with Juliet and visits Jack once a month. She performs an ultrasound on Sun, causing Sun and Jin to "remember". Juliet is given tickets by Jack so she can take David and Claire, revealed to be Jack's half-sister, to a concert. While waiting in line for the event, Juliet receives a page from the hospital and departs.

Later at the hospital, Juliet notices Sawyer fishing a candy bar from a vending machine. She suggests unplugging and plugging it back in and once it is free, she remarks, "It worked" - her original dying words. When Juliet passes Sawyer the candy, they experience vision-like flashes of their past. She tells Sawyer, "We should get coffee sometime... we can go Dutch." This mirrors their conversation before Juliet died in Sawyer's arms indicating that as she was passing, her consciousness was already meeting Sawyer again in this "flash sideways reality". Juliet and Sawyer touch once more and fully regain their memories of their lives together. They realize the "flash sideways" is, in fact, a purgatory the survivors on the Island created so they could find each other after death and move on together; physical contact with one's "constant" (the person one loved the most) would "awaken" them and cause them to "remember". Having finally been reunited, Juliet and Sawyer embrace and passionately kiss.

Juliet, now wearing her engagement ring, makes her way to the church with Sawyer where they gather with the other former denizens of the Island. As Christian Shephard (John Terry) opens the church doors, a glowing white light flows in and Juliet and Sawyer move on to the afterlife together as soulmates.

== Development ==
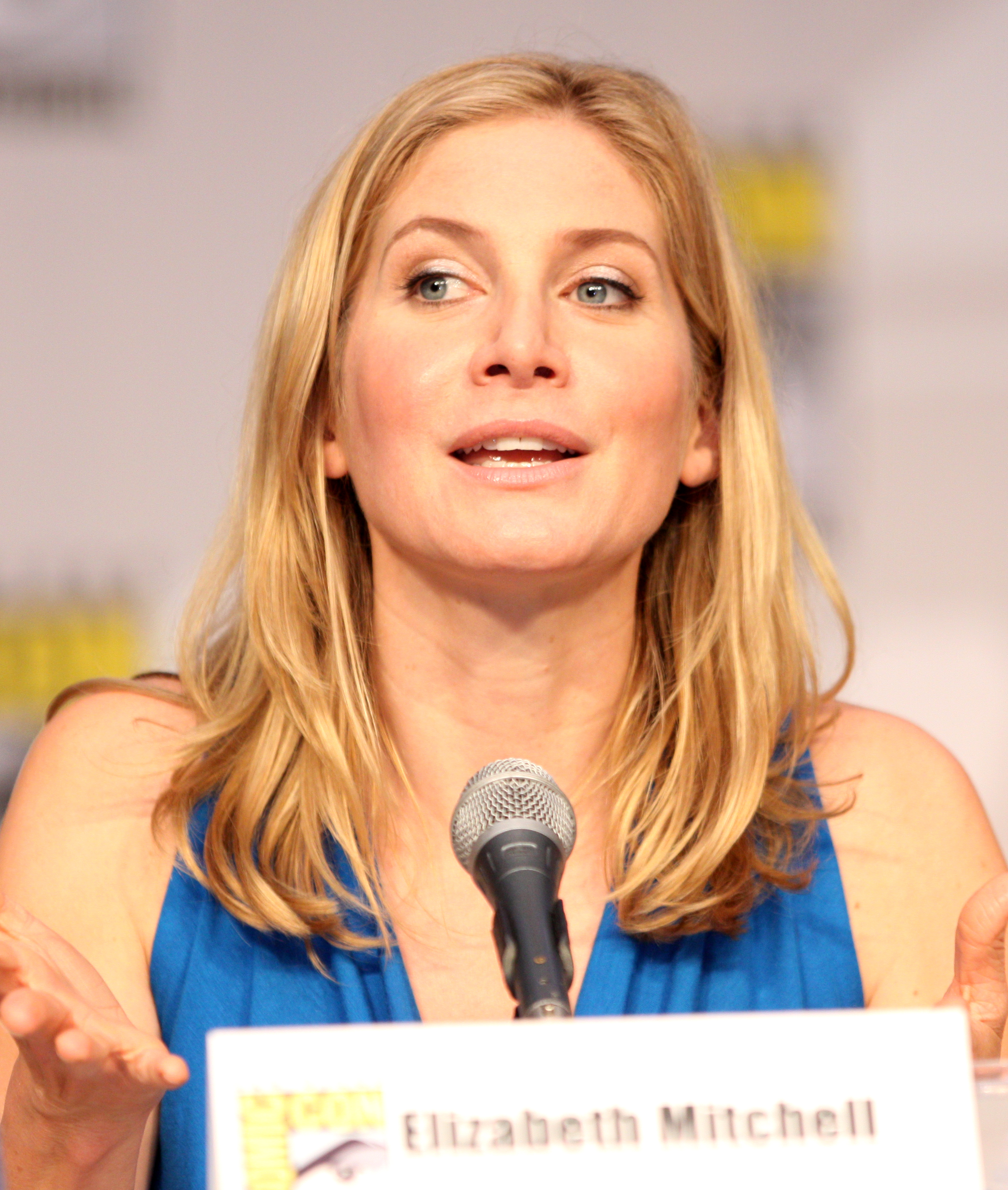
Elizabeth Mitchell (pictured in 2010) played Juliet on Lost since the third season

Elizabeth Mitchell was cast as a new series regular on Lost in late July, 2006. Her character, Dr. Juliet Burke, was conceived by the writers as the bridge between the Others and the survivors as well as the next possible love interest for Jack, though her arc was further developed and expanded upon as the story progressed. Mitchell commented, "They needed a bridge between Ben and everyone else, and they needed someone to come in and be a little salt in the oyster of Jack and Kate."

The third season's premiere, "A Tale of Two Cities", was the first episode of Lost to feature Juliet. Mitchell has commented one of her first days shooting was for the season's opening sequence, during which the Others watch Oceanic Flight 815 fall out of the sky and crash on the Island. When she first met actor Matthew Fox, they briefly introduced themselves but most of their initial conversation was in regard to the script and their characters. Mitchell found this helpful while shooting the premiere's scenes, since then they knew the other as their characters, and not as Matthew and Elizabeth. The scene in which Jack yells at Juliet, and she responds "No Jack, I think you're stubborn", was used as her audition scene. While she is initially depicted as a morally ambiguous antiheroine, Juliet is, over the course of the series, shown to be an intelligent and resourceful individual who tries to help others but often feels conflicted over her own needs.

== Reception ==
Both the character and Elizabeth Mitchell's performance have received significant praise from critics and fans. Juliet is widely considered to be the best female character on Lost and is often ranked on lists of the top 10 characters of the series.

Juliet's debut in the third season's premiere "A Tale of Two Cities" received a positive response, with the Los Angeles Times praising her "killer" introduction. IGN found her first encounters with Jack "interesting", and called her "a promising new character who will hopefully add a new dimension to The Others." Juliet's moral ambiguity and initially mysterious true intentions were also met with praise. Entertainment Weekly described "scheming Juliet" as "captivating". Maureen Ryan of the Chicago Tribune opined that Juliet replaced Ben Linus as the "most chilling villain on Lost" and declared her the "Best female villain of the fall of 2006", writing, "Her icy reserve is what makes Juliet so effective as a character; does it mask sorrow or a heart of stone? Not knowing is what gives her scenes such suspense."

The display of the character's "more human side" through flashbacks in "Not in Portland" was lauded by IGN's Chris Carabott, who deemed the episode worthy of getting viewers "back on the Lost hype train." Carabott also deemed Elizabeth Mitchell's performance in the subsequent Juliet-centric episode "One of Us" as "[Mitchell's] best of the season," writing, "She does a wonderful job portraying the character's emotional rollercoaster ride from confident scientist to heartbroken captive of the Others." BuddyTV Senior Writer Jon Lachonis also complimented Mitchell's "sensitive, enigmatic portrayal" of Juliet in "One of Us", which he called "the most perfect episode of Lost ever produced, bar none."

For her performance in the fourth season's Juliet-centric episode, "The Other Woman", Mitchell won the award for "Best Supporting Actress on Television" at the 34th Saturn Awards in 2008.

Mitchell submitted her performance in the episode "One of Us" for consideration on her behalf in the category of "Outstanding Supporting Actress in a Drama Series" at the 2007 Emmy Awards, but was not nominated. She did, however, receive an Emmy nomination in 2010 for her performance in the series finale "The End", this time in the guest actress category.
