= Ben Linus =

Fictional character of the TV series Lost

Benjamin Linus
- Lost character
- Michael Emerson as Ben Linus in the fourth season episode "Cabin Fever"
- First appearance: "One of Them" (2006)
- Last appearance: "The New Man in Charge" (2010)
- Created by: J. J. Abrams; Damon Lindelof
- Portrayed by: Michael Emerson; Sterling Beaumon (Young Ben)
- Centric episode(s): "The Man Behind the Curtain" "The Shape of Things to Come" "Dead Is Dead" "Dr. Linus" "What They Died For"

In-universe information
- Full name: Benjamin Linus
- Aliases: Henry Gale, Dean Moriarty
- Species: Human
- Gender: Male
- Occupation: Leader of the Others; Teacher (flash-sideways)
- Children: Alex Rousseau (adoptive daughter)
- Relatives: Roger Linus (father); Emily Linus (mother)
- Nationality: American

Benjamin Linus is a fictional character portrayed by Michael Emerson on the ABC television series Lost. Ben was the leader of a group of Island natives called the Others and was initially known as Henry Gale to the survivors of Oceanic Flight 815. He began as the main antagonist during the second and third seasons, but in subsequent seasons, becomes a morally ambiguous ally to the main characters. Other characters frequently describe him as loyal only to himself, though it is also often hinted that he may be driven by some higher purpose.

As with most characters on Lost, Ben's history is revealed through flashbacks and episodes set in other time periods which are revealed slowly as the series progresses. Sterling Beaumon first portrayed a young Ben late in season three, in the character's first centric episode, "The Man Behind the Curtain". Ben's childhood is further explored in the fifth season of the series, partially set in 1977. The fifth season episode "Dead Is Dead" explores Ben's fragile state following the events of the fourth season, in which his loyalty to the Island led to the death of his adoptive daughter Alex Rousseau (Tania Raymonde), and flashbacks show the audience Ben's original acquisition of Alex and his rise to leadership of the Others, after exiling his rival Charles Widmore (Alan Dale). Originally cast for three guest appearances in the second season, Emerson's role was expanded. As leader of the Others, Ben became a regular cast member from the third season onward. Reviews of the show would often focus on Ben's mysterious motives. Emerson's portrayal garnered many positive reviews, resulting in four consecutive nominations for the Emmy for Outstanding Supporting Actor from 2007 to 2010, winning in 2009.

In 2010, Ben Linus was ranked #24 on the TV Guide Network special 25 Greatest TV Characters of All Time. In 2016, Rolling Stone ranked him #1 of their "40 Greatest TV Villains of All Time".

== Arc ==
=== Prior to the crash ===
Flashbacks during "The Man Behind the Curtain" show Benjamin Linus being born in the woods outside of Portland, Oregon, to Roger (Jon Gries) and Emily Linus (Carrie Preston). Emily dies after giving birth to Ben. When Ben is young, he and his father move to the Island, after Roger is offered a job working for the Dharma Initiative. On the Island, Ben begins to see visions of his mother, while Roger starts drinking heavily and physically and verbally abusing him. Ben develops a hatred for the Dharma Initiative and one day runs away from the Barracks. He comes across Richard Alpert (Nestor Carbonell), one of the Island natives known to the Initiative as the "Hostiles", in the jungle, who grants Ben's request to join his group but tells him he needs to be very patient.

Season five's "Namaste" shows a young Ben coming into contact with a captured Sayid Jarrah (Naveen Andrews), who along with several other Oceanic Flight 815 survivors has been brought back in time from 2007. In the following episode, "He's Our You", he helps free Sayid under the impression Sayid was sent by the Others to bring him to Richard. Sayid instead shoots Ben and leaves him for dead. Fellow crash survivor Jack Shephard (Matthew Fox) refuses to help the boy, so Kate Austen (Evangeline Lilly) and James "Sawyer" Ford (Josh Holloway) take Ben to Richard, who informs them Ben will henceforth lose his innocence and always be one of the Others. In 1987 (or possibly 1992) he assists the hostiles in using poisonous gas to kill the Dharma Initiative, including his father. In 1988, Charles Widmore, leader of the Others, sends Ben to kill French scientist Danielle Rousseau (Melissa Farman), who was marooned on the island. However, when Ben learns Rousseau has a child, he kidnaps the baby Alex Rousseau, warning Rousseau to never come looking for the baby if she wants either of them to live. He banishes Charles Widmore from the island and assumes his leadership role, as he is the only one who can allegedly interact with their real leader, Jacob, and communicate his will to the group.

Two days before the crash of Oceanic Flight 815, Ben discovers he has a spinal tumor. After witnessing the crash, he sends Ethan Rom (William Mapother) and Goodwin Stanhope (Brett Cullen) to investigate. He chooses Goodwin in order to remove Ben's competition for the affections of Juliet Burke (Elizabeth Mitchell), a woman recruited to the island three years previously in order to help the Others with their fertility problems.

=== After the crash ===
==== Seasons two to four ====
Ben makes his first appearance in the season two episode "One of Them", where he is caught in a trap set by Danielle Rousseau (Mira Furlan). He pretends to be Henry Gale, a man from Minnesota who crashed on the island while traveling via hot air balloon. Rousseau turns him over to Sayid, who takes him to the Swan Station, where he is held captive and interrogated. Ben is exposed as a fraud when the body of the real Henry Gale is found, but he is set free by Michael Dawson (Harold Perrineau), a crash survivor whose son has been kidnapped by the Others. When Michael successfully brings Jack, Kate, and Sawyer to the pier, Ben gives him a boat so he can leave the Island with his son. Ben then takes Jack, Kate, and Sawyer to a smaller island nearby.

In the beginning of season three, Ben gives Juliet the task of interrogating Jack, while Kate and Sawyer are kept in cages. In the season 3 episode "Exposé", Ben and Juliet enter a Dharma station, the Pearl, and watch Jack on a monitor. Ben tells Juliet he will convince Jack to perform surgery on him. After Goodwin dies, Ben shows Juliet the corpse, so she knows she is Ben's and will be on the Island forever. He admits to Jack about having a tumor on his spine, and asks him to remove it in order for him to leave the Island. During the surgery he wakes up, and Jack refuses to finish until Kate and Sawyer are safely away from the Others. After they escape, Ben's operation is finished. He returns to the Barracks with the rest of the Others and Jack in tow. When John Locke (Terry O'Quinn) comes to rescue Jack, he and Ben have a confrontation. Ben tells Locke of a "magic box" which can produce whatever someone wishes for and shows him his father, Anthony Cooper (Kevin Tighe), whom they are holding captive after he was brought to the Island because of the box. Ben offers Locke the opportunity to join the Others, but only if he kills Cooper; Ben knows he won't kill in cold blood, and makes the offer as a way to humiliate Locke. Locke returns a few days later with Cooper's corpse, having used Sawyer to do the deed for him, so Ben takes him to meet Jacob. When Ben discovers Locke can hear Jacob, he shoots Locke and leaves him for dead. He returns to the Others' camp and tells Richard, now his second-in-command, to lead the remaining Others to the Temple. Ben takes Alex with him as he attempts to prevent Jack from sending a radio message to a nearby freighter. He reunites Alex with her mother, and claims that if Jack contacts the freighter, every single person on the Island will die. Ben is beaten and taken hostage, and forced to watch as the freighter is contacted.

In the first episode of season four, "The Beginning of the End", the survivors divide into two groups. Those who believe the people from the freighter to be dangerous, Ben among them, join Locke and head to the Barracks. After Ben confesses the freighter crew has come to capture him, Miles Straume (Ken Leung), a medium from the freighter, makes a deal with Ben, asking for $3.2 million in exchange for reporting Ben as dead to Charles Widmore (Alan Dale), the man who sent the freighter. Ben agrees after Miles rebuffs his claims such a small fortune is beyond him. Ben eventually gets his freedom when he tells Locke who sent the freighter. Once free, Ben urges Alex, and her boyfriend and mother, to travel to the Temple, for protection from the people on the freighter. However, they are ambushed en route by mercenaries from the freighter and all but Alex are killed. Alex is taken hostage after revealing herself to be Ben's daughter. In "The Shape of Things to Come", Martin Keamy (Kevin Durand), the leader of the mercenaries, threatens to shoot Alex if Ben does not come forward; Ben staunchly denies any attachment to her, which results in her execution. Ben claims Widmore has "changed the rules", then summons the smoke monster to attack the mercenaries. He then leaves with Locke and Hugo "Hurley" Reyes (Jorge Garcia) to communicate with Jacob. Locke enters Jacob's cabin alone, and returns stating they need to move the Island. They go to the Orchid, a Dharma station which allows them to do this. Ben sends Locke to become the new leader of the Others, then enters a secret level of the Orchid. He turns a large frozen wheel in the wall, which teleports the Island to a new location. Ben himself is transported to the Sahara Desert, specifically, Tunisia, which was formerly the ancient country of Carthage.

The flashforwards in "The Shape of Things to Come" show Ben arrives in the Sahara Desert ten months ahead of when he left the Island. Ben finds Sayid at the funeral of his wife Nadia (Andrea Gabriel), and recruits Sayid as his personal assassin, telling him Widmore ordered the assassination of his wife. Ben provides Sayid with a list of targets, all of which he successfully kills over the next three years. At one point, Ben infiltrates Widmore's penthouse apartment in London to inform him of his intention to kill his daughter, Penelope (Sonya Walger), as retribution for the death of Alex.

==== Seasons five and six ====
When Locke leaves the island to bring the survivors back to the island, Ben tracks him down. He gets Locke to reveal what he knows about returning to the island, then kills him and stages it as a suicide. Ben visits Jack in the funeral home housing Locke's body, telling Jack he will help him return to the island, but the only way to get back is to bring everyone who had left it, including Locke's corpse. Ben boards Ajira Airways Flight 316 with the rest of survivors, which then crashes on the island. Jack, Kate, Hurley, and Sayid are transported to 1977, while Sun and Ben remain in 2007 with a resurrected Locke. The plane crash lands on the Hydra Island, so Ben attempts to take a boat to the main island. Sun strikes him in the back of the head and takes the boat with Frank, so Ben is left in the care of the other survivors, including Locke. After Ben regains consciousness and finds Locke to be alive, he convinces Locke he knew bringing him to the island would resurrect him, and he stopped Locke's suicide attempt merely to gain information. Locke travels with Ben, who is to be judged by the Monster. After they fail to find the Monster at the Barracks, they head to the Temple. As Ben and Locke travel through a series of tunnels beneath the Temple, Ben falls through the floor, so Locke leaves to get something that he can pull him up with. The Monster flows out of a grate below and surrounds Ben, showing flashes of decisions he made in his life involving Alex. The Monster takes the form of Alex and pushes Ben against a wall. She says she knows Ben is planning to kill Locke again, and if he does she will hunt him down and destroy him. She orders him to follow Locke and do whatever he asks, then disappears. They return to the Others' camp, where Locke gathers the group together and announces he is taking them to see Jacob. As they are walking, Ben relates his experience with the Monster and his promise to do whatever Locke asks, so Locke convinces Ben to kill Jacob. Richard leads them to the base of the statue, where Jacob lives. Within, they are met by Jacob (Mark Pellegrino). Jacob greets Locke and observes Locke has found a loophole. It is revealed that Locke was not resurrected, and is instead the Monster taking the form of Locke. Ben confronts Jacob about why he never revealed himself at any time during Ben's tenure as leader, but when Jacob is dismissive towards him, he stabs Jacob twice, killing him – and in doing so, binds his destiny to the island, sealing his own fate.

After Jacob's death, the Monster tells Ben to fetch Richard, as he wants to speak to him. However, when Ben exits the statue, Richard throws him down beside the corpse of the real John Locke, which has been brought to the statue by survivors of the Ajira flight, led by Ilana Verdansky (Zuleikha Robinson). Ben is forced by Ilana's group to bring them to the imposter Locke. They start shooting at the Monster, but he disappears, then returns in its black smoke form, killing Ilana's group. The Monster returns to Locke's form and mockingly informs Ben of the real Locke's last thoughts, while being strangled by Ben. Afterwards, Ben comforts Ilana when he finds her crying in Jacob's chamber and sets off with her, Sun, and Frank Lapidus (Jeff Fahey) to bury Locke before going to the Temple, where they believe they will be safe from the Monster. At Locke's funeral, Ben provides the eulogy, and expresses his sincere apologies for killing Locke. When they arrive at the Temple, the Monster is destroying the place. They return to the beach as a temporary shelter, and Ben attempts to make amends with everyone for killing Jacob. Ilana then forces him to dig a grave and explains she will kill Ben for murdering her father figure. Later, the Monster visits Ben, telling him to join him and then magically frees Ben. After Ben escapes, Ilana chases after him, and the two come face-to-face at the jungle when Ben points a rifle at her. Ben explains to her why he really killed Jacob, particularly grieving his daughter. Ilana understands and allows him to rejoin their group, which he does. Hurley, Jack, and Richard show up and join their group, then have a meeting, deciding what to do next. Richard suggests they should stop the Monster escaping by blowing up the Ajira plane. After Hurley destroys the available dynamite from the shipwrecked Black Rock, Richard insists he will find other explosives. Ben and Miles join Richard, while the rest decide to go talk to the Monster. When Ben, Richard and Miles arrive at the Barracks, Widmore is there, and is soon joined by the Monster. Ben murders Widmore before he is able to make a deal with the Monster to spare his daughter. The Monster and Ben find Desmond and the Monster forces him to go destroy the Island. They run into Jack's group and they both go to the heart of the Island, where Desmond removes the cork of the Island, causing the Island to begin collapsing. After Jack kills the Monster, Ben and Hurley volunteer to stay behind on the Island with Jack to assist him relighting the Island. Jack tells them he will die doing this and Jack gives Hurley the new position of being protector of the Island. Ben advises him to approach his Island duties with his kindness and helpful attitude. Hurley asks Ben to become his advisor, to which he is honored. After an undisclosed period of time, Ben, on orders from Hurley, arrives at the Dharma Logistics Warehouse in Guam. He speaks to the two workers there and instructs them that the facility is being shut down. Afterward, Ben arrives at the Santa Rosa Mental Hospital and visits Walt. Ben tells him that he is still special and that he can help his father, Michael, even though he is dead, and offers Walt a job to return to the island.

The afterlife experienced by the survivors is shown during season six. In "The Substitute", Ben Linus is shown as a teacher of European History. In "Dr. Linus", Ben laments his life in general, frustrated with the school bureaucracy and particularly due to Reynolds, the principal who does not care for the school. He is living with his father, Roger (Jon Gries), who is on life support. At school, he is shown to have a close relationship with his star pupil, Alex, and befriends a substitute teacher, John Locke. While studying together, Alex tells Ben that Principal Reynolds is having a sexual affair with one of the school nurses on campus. Ben attempts to blackmail Reynolds, threatening to reveal his affair and citing his position as principal as the demand. However, Reynolds swiftly retaliates by saying if he makes good on his threats, Alex's chances of going to Yale University will decrease substantially, as he is requested to write her a recommendation letter. Wanting to save Alex's educational future, Ben backs down. Days later, Ben notices Desmond Hume waiting outside the school in his car for an extended amount of time. Desmond runs over Locke, and swiftly drives off. As soon as the ambulance arrives, Ben gets in and sits next to the critically injured Locke, assuring him everything will be all right. When Locke returns to the school, Desmond does as well, and Ben catches him. Desmond beats Ben severely saying he was only trying to help Locke let go. Ben has a vision from his previous life during Desmond's beating. Ben believes him and relays Locke this information. When Alex sees how badly Ben was beaten, she invites him to her house where her mother, Danielle, fixes him supper. Danielle tells Ben that Alex views him as a father, and Ben begins to cry. Ben waits outside the chapel where the Oceanic survivors plan to move on together, and he sees Locke for the last time. Ben sincerely apologizes to Locke for killing him, and Locke forgives him. Hurley later comes out of the chapel and invites Ben in, but Ben politely declines saying he is not ready to move on, saying he "has a few things to work out". Hurley accepts this, and tells Ben that he was a "real good number two", thanking him for his help in protecting the island. Ben, touched by this, responds "And you were a great number one, Hugo."

== Personality ==
"That's what my father does – he manipulates people. He makes you think it's your idea but it's his."

— Alex in "The Man from Tallahassee"

Ben, although extremely well-mannered, has an impeccable ability to lie and manipulate the people around him, even when he is at a physical disadvantage. He often speaks in a low, emotionless monotone when at his most unreadable, frequently sprinkling his speech with sarcasm or dry, mirthless jokes. He can also be petty and vindictive, even to the point of murder, when he does not get what he wants. He unsuccessfully tries to convince the survivors he is Henry Gale, although he succeeds in manipulating Locke to turn against Jack while held prisoner under this guise. While he claims he will not sacrifice innocent lives in order to accomplish his goals, he has been shown to do quite the opposite. In the third-season finale, Ben is informed by Tom Friendly (M. C. Gainey), an Other, that they have captured three of the crash survivors: Sayid Jarrah, Bernard Nadler (Sam Anderson), and Jin-Soo Kwon (Daniel Dae Kim). When Tom tells Ben they are unwilling to reveal any information about the rest of the survivors, Ben quickly replies "Shoot Kwon... You want them to answer questions, kill Kwon – do it now". Conversely, Ben refuses to allow his spy on the freighter to destroy it long before it reaches the Island, as he would not kill anyone who "did not deserve to die". Furthermore, when Locke confronts Ben about causing the freighter to explode, Ben coldly replies, "So?"

"I have full sympathy [for Ben]. I believe he has a mission and an agenda that he hasn't shared with us yet. The survival of the earth may depend on Ben's work, so it justifies his ruthless behavior. Maybe I'm just fantasizing or deluding myself."

— Actor Michael Emerson, who plays Ben

Ben's unclear motives have led to speculation about his possible status as a villain. Ben Rawson-Jones from Digital Spy describes Ben as a "supposed villain", pondering "Could he really have been the good guy all along" following the fourth-season episode "The Shape of Things to Come". Actor Michael Emerson suspects where Ben's loyalties lie will always be ambiguous, making this a "wonderful role". He is rarely shown losing control of his emotions, but when he does, it is done in a big and childish way. Emerson explains "He's cold because any trace of warmth makes him vulnerable to his enemies". Ben is also known for his commitment to the island and doing whatever is necessary to protect it. He has no qualms with Locke attempting to kill Naomi (Marsha Thomason) and even Jack after the survivors begin to call the freighter. He undertakes the risky and unpredictable step of moving the Island to prevent the freighter crew, and thus Charles Widmore, from finding it. He always has a plan and is described by Kevin Thompson from The Palm Beach Post as a "know-it-all", which another reviewer thinks is because "[Ben] talks quietly, in a menacingly measured drawl... with lots of pauses and emphases".

== Development ==
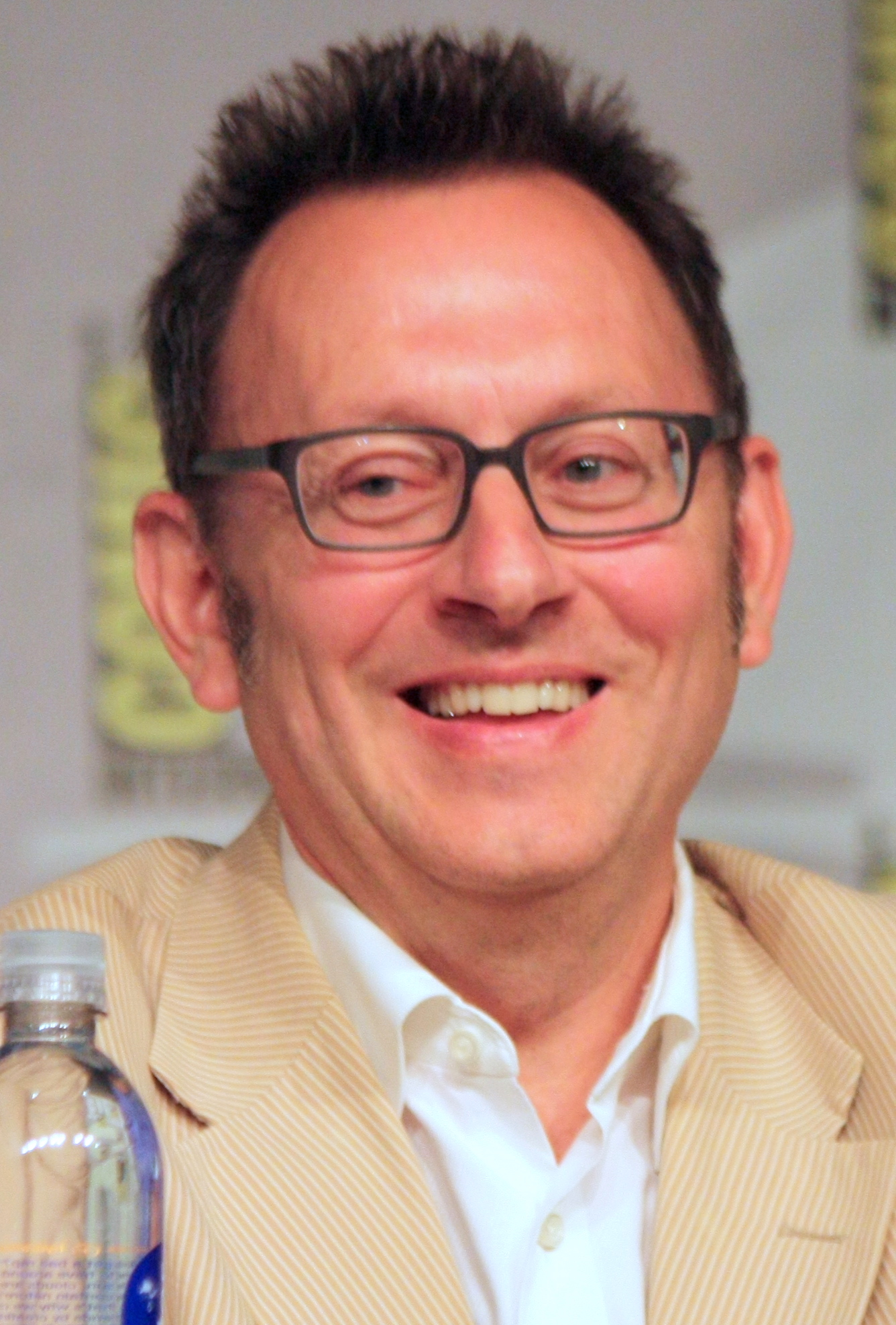
Michael Emerson was cast on the show after receiving a Primetime Emmy for his role on The Practice

In 2001, Michael Emerson won a Primetime Emmy Award for his guest appearance as serial killer William Hinks on The Practice. The Lost producers liked his work on The Practice, so they were keen to cast Emerson in the role of Ben, then known as "Henry Gale", as they thought he would fit the character well. He was originally contracted to appear in just three episodes of Lost, making his first appearance midway through the second season, in episode "One of Them". The producers were so impressed by him that they contracted him for a further five episodes, citing the scene at the end of "The Whole Truth" where Ben asks for milk as the moment they knew he was a "keeper". He was then made a part of the regular cast from the third season. Had Emerson not worked out during his initial appearances, a different actor would have been cast for the leader of the Others, but it was always intended that the survivors would have the leader right under their noses and not realize it. During one episode of the Official Lost Podcast, the producers stated that they always knew Ben would be the "Big Bad". Emerson had no idea of his character's importance during his second season recurring role. He was told nothing about Ben's backstory and only received scripts at the last minute. He enjoyed how the ambiguity of Ben's motives allowed him to "paint it the way [he] please[s]". Sterling Beaumon was cast to play Ben in the flashbacks of episode "The Man Behind the Curtain". Emerson's wife Carrie Preston was cast as Ben's mother following Emerson telling people at parties that she was desperate for a part on the show.

Referring to the scene in the third season where Ben pretends to fit Sawyer with a lethal pacemaker, Emerson comments, "Sadistic may be the word, but he doesn't seem to take much relish in it. He's just sort of detached, he looks at it coldly. I sometimes feel like everything to him is a sort of scientific experiment and he is interested in a dispassionate way in how the experiment runs its course. I think some day if we ever find out what his parentage is, that his parents were people of science". Elizabeth Mitchell, who plays Juliet, did not think it was a "huge surprise for Juliet that Ben had feelings for [Juliet], but I still think it was... it was horrifying under the circumstances". She also thought "[Juliet has] this kind of wonderful mind, and I think that Ben probably has a tremendous respect for that. It's not because Juliet is so enticing, it's just the fact that she's got this amazing mind, she has this amazing, you know, intelligence, and I think that's what intrigues him, that's what draws him into her". During season four the producers deliberately left it ambiguous as to whether Ben was a part of the Oceanic 6 (six survivors of the plane crash that make it off the Island) after he appeared in one of Sayid's flashforwards.

== Reception ==
=== Critical reception ===
During the beginning of season three, Chris Carabott from IGN described Ben as "one of the best 'villains on television' due to his 'eerie manner' and 'methodical delivery'". Later in the season Carabott had a problem with Ben being so deceptive, as "anything he imparts must be taken with a grain of salt". Jeff Jensen of Entertainment Weekly also noted this, saying, "I don't trust Ben. I have no idea when he's lying and when he's telling the truth. The only thing I'm reasonably sure of is that everything he says is for the purpose of impacting a character — and the audience". Ben's father issues revealed towards the end of season three are described as "not the most original Lost character trait by any means but it is the thrust behind Ben's development into the genocidal maniac he eventually becomes". Following the penultimate episode of the season, Carabott stated, "Even with his limited screen time, Michael Emerson's performance shines through and we hope that he survives the events of the finale because we love seeing his character every week." Erin Martell from TV Squad picked the Others as one of her season three highlights, partly due to the development of Ben, adding, "I cannot even picture the final three seasons without Ben". Martell also gave six reasons to look forward to season four, one of which was Ben Linus.

Aubry D'Arminio of Entertainment Weekly describes "savvy Ben" as a "captivating minor character". Jeff Jensen of Entertainment Weekly praised Emerson's acting in the beginning of season four, calling him "a genius in [the] role". Alan Sepinwall from The Star-Ledger worried that "the actor is so good and the character so popular that he's kept alive even though it makes all the heroes look like idiots". Following "Confirmed Dead", Entertainment Weekly's Jeff Jensen asked, "Isn't the whole business of Ben manipulating Locke with the promise of Island secrets getting just a little bit old?" SyFy Portal's Dan Compora said, "The more I hate Ben, the more I realize that Michael Emerson is just a very fine actor doing his job". Don Williams of BuddyTV said, "Consider my mind blown again", referring to the flashforward in "The Economist" where it is revealed that Sayid is working for Ben. Oscar Dahl of BuddyTV called Emerson an acting "god". Chris Carabott from IGN found one of the best moments of "Eggtown" was the power struggle between Locke and Ben, because "Their scenes together are amongst the best in the series and the one that opens "Eggtown" is a perfect display of how well Michael Emerson and Terry O'Quinn work together. O'Quinn captures Locke's uncertainty perfectly in the opening scene and it's always fun to watch Ben prey on any weakness of character." Kevin Thompson of The Palm Beach Post wrote, "With those big ol' eyes of his, [Emerson] could always say more with a lengthy stare than he could with twenty pages of dialogue.... [He has], once again, proved why he has become Lost's star as well as its heart and soul.... an Emmy should belong to [him]." Jennifer Godwin of E! wrote, "No one has ever done better work humanizing a supervillain." Matt Roush of TV Guide puts Ben in "The Shape of Things to Come" in the top 20 moments of the week, stating, "Michael Emerson on Lost. It doesn't get better than that". Ben Rawson-Jones of Digital Spy describes Emerson's performance as "fantastic", with "many layers of intrigue and humanity". John Kubicek of BuddyTV also found his performance "fantastic", adding, "He nailed it". Critic Kelly Woo, from TV Squad, placed him second on her list of "Seven new characters that worked", ranking just below Desmond Hume, also from Lost.

=== Awards ===
In 2006, Michael Emerson was nominated for the Satellite Award for Best Supporting Actor – Series, Miniseries, or Television Film, but lost out to Tony Plana from Ugly Betty.

In 2007, following the third season, Emerson was nominated for the Saturn Award for Best Supporting Actor on Television, losing to Masi Oka from Heroes. Later in the year, Emerson was nominated for the Primetime Emmy Award for Outstanding Supporting Actor in a Drama Series at the 59th Primetime Emmy Awards, but lost to fellow Lost cast member Terry O'Quinn. Emerson was nominated again for the Satellite Award for Best Supporting Actor – Series, Miniseries, or Television Film, this time losing to David Zayas from Dexter, but eventually won the Saturn Award for Best Supporting Actor on Television, beating out fellow Lost actors Terry O'Quinn and Josh Holloway. Emerson was also nominated for the Teen Choice Award for Best Villain.

In 2008, Emerson was nominated again for the Primetime Emmy Award at the 60th Primetime Emmy Awards, but lost to Željko Ivanek from Damages. On September 20, 2009, Emerson finally won the Primetime Emmy Award for his portrayal of Ben Linus at the 61st Primetime Emmy Awards. In 2010, Emerson was nominated for the Golden Globe Award for Best Supporting Actor – Series, Miniseries, or Television Film, but lost to John Lithgow from Dexter. For his final nomination for his portrayal of Ben Linus, Emerson was nominated again for the Primetime Emmy Award at the 62nd Primetime Emmy Awards, this time losing to Aaron Paul from Breaking Bad.
