= Flashes Before Your Eyes =

- Lost episode
- Episode no.: Season 3 Episode 8
- Directed by: Jack Bender
- Written by: Damon Lindelof; Drew Goddard
- Production code: 308
- Original air date: February 14, 2007
- Running time: 42 minutes

Guest appearances
- Sonya Walger as Penny Widmore; Alan Dale as Charles Widmore; Shishir Kurup as Donovan; Fionnula Flanagan as Ms. Hawking; Jeremy Colvin as Delivery man; David Cordell as Jimmy Lennon; Katie Doyle as Receptionist; Michael Titterton as Bartender; Stephen Quinn as Photographer; John Williamson as Red shoes

Episode chronology
← Previous "Not in Portland"	Next → "Stranger in a Strange Land"
- Lost season 3

"Flashes Before Your Eyes" is the 8th episode of the third season of the American drama television series Lost, and the show's 57th episode overall. The episode was written by the series co-creator, show runner and executive producer Damon Lindelof and supervising producer Drew Goddard, and directed by Jack Bender. It first aired in the United States on February 14, 2007, on the American Broadcasting Company. The episode received mostly positive reviews from critics. Lindelof and Goddard were nominated for the Writers Guild of America (WGA) Award for Best Episodic Drama at the February 2008 ceremony for writing the episode.

In this episode, Hugo "Hurley" Reyes (Jorge Garcia) and Charlie Pace (Dominic Monaghan) conclude that Desmond Hume (Henry Ian Cusick) can see into the future after he saves Claire Littleton (Emilie de Ravin) from drowning. It is revealed that after the hatch imploded, Desmond traveled back to London and relived his past before coming back to the island. Desmond also reveals to Charlie that Charlie is destined to die.

== Plot ==
While in the middle of a conversation with several other castaways, Desmond, without warning, sprints toward and dives into the ocean. No one on the beach understands why, until they see that Claire is drowning in the ocean but Desmond saves her. Noting this event, as well as events that have happened previously in the season – such as Desmond knowing about a speech Locke would make before he would make it, as well as Desmond inserting a rod on a tent just hours before that rod was struck by lightning – Hurley concludes that Desmond has precognition, but Charlie is skeptical. They hatch a plan to get Desmond to get drunk and confess. After several drinks, Charlie asks Desmond about his future-seeing abilities. Instead of answering, Desmond gets up to leave, but after Charlie calls him a "coward", a drunken Desmond tackles and chokes Charlie, shouting that Charlie does not know what he has been through.

A flashback scene shows the hatch about to implode following the failure to enter the numbers in "Live Together, Die Alone". After Desmond twists the key, he suddenly wakes up in 1996 in a London apartment with his girlfriend Penelope Widmore (Sonya Walger), and he is shown to have vague memories of his time on the island. Desmond is clearly puzzled, but is relieved to finally be with Penny again. Desmond later goes to Penny's billionaire father, Charles Widmore (Alan Dale) and asks for his permission to marry his daughter. Widmore rejects Desmond, who is crushed and humiliated. Walking out of the building, Desmond sees Charlie singing and playing his guitar for money on the sidewalk. Desmond asks him if he remembers him but Charlie does not. Frustrated, Desmond rants about his time on the island and predicts it will rain, which it suddenly does. At a pub, Desmond meets with his friend, a physicist, and after retelling the events on the island asks him if time travel is possible, but the physicist denies it. Hearing familiar music, Desmond predicts for several events to happen in this pub tonight, namely the outcome of a football game being broadcast on TV as well as a thug about to attack the bartender, but neither event happens.

Later, while shopping for a ring for Penny, Desmond runs into the shopkeeper, Eloise Hawking (Fionnula Flanagan). She tells Desmond his future. Hawking takes Desmond on a walk, and Hawking notes a particular man, with red shoes, just before the man is crushed to death by a falling scaffolding. She explains that although she knew the man would die, she did not help because the universe has a way of "course correcting", and he would die anyway; if she warned him of the scaffolding, he would be hit by a taxi the next day, if she warned him of that he'd break his neck in a shower accident the next. Desmond and Penny go on a walk together and take a picture, where he breaks up with her after realizing that he does not have enough money to support her. He returns to the pub, and the predictions he made the previous night turn out to be true – this shows that Desmond does have precognition, his timing was just off. Desmond warns the bartender of the thug attacking him, and he ducks, but the thug's bat hits Desmond and he is knocked out. He wakes up back on the Island naked, as seen in "Further Instructions".

The flashback ends, and Desmond is pulled off Charlie by Hurley. They help Desmond to his tent. Charlie tries to get an answer from him one last time. Desmond reveals that both times he rescued Claire, he was really saving Charlie; Charlie would have been electrocuted if Desmond hadn't inserted the rod, and Charlie would have drowned attempting to save Claire from the ocean had Desmond not done so. Desmond tells Charlie that although he has prevented his death twice, Charlie is destined to die (this is in reference to Hawking's comments on "course correction").

== Production ==
"Flashes Before Your Eyes" was the 15th episode of the series directed by Jack Bender. The episode was written by Damon Lindelof and Drew Goddard; the pair had never before collaborated on an episode.

This episode is the first to deal with the concept of time travel, the next being "The Constant" in the fourth season. Unlike other flashback sequences to this point, this is positioned as actual time travel for Desmond. However, in this episode ground rules are established to prevent paradoxes in the story line as a result of time travel. Had these rules not been established, the writers feared that viewers would lose interest because the stakes of the characters would be lessened. In an interview, Henry Ian Cusick, who plays Desmond, said shooting the episode was both "fun" and "tiring". Cusick said that when shooting the episode "you're finishing late and starting early", but he enjoyed working with director Jack Bender because "he pushes you to, to try and go a little bit further than you think you can". The London scenes were shot in Honolulu. This led to several continuity errors, such as a British Army recruitment poster for a Scottish regiment (which would not recruit in England) featuring the word "Honour" being incorrectly spelled in the American English "Honor" and a photograph of a British soldier using an American M4 carbine and urging people to join the "military" (instead of the "army", as a British poster would say). Another error is a cup of tea made in a microwave rather than the use of a kettle.

== Reception ==
"Flashes Before Your Eyes" received mostly positive reviews. IGN's Chris Carabott wrote that "if last week's 'Not in Portland' didn't get you back on the Lost hype train then for goodness' sake the equally outstanding 'Flashes Before Your Eyes' hopefully grabbed your attention." Carabott went on to praise the on-screen chemistry of Henry Ian Cusick (Desmond) and Sonya Walger (Penelope), stating that "their on screen chemistry makes the love between the two characters real and makes their inevitable breakup that much harder to handle." He also complimented the scene between Desmond and Charles, saying that "it's hard not to feel Desmond's heart crushed when Widmore denies him Penelope's hand in marriage." Josh Spiegel, a writer for CinemaBlend.com, had similar praise. He said that for him "it was a nice change of pace to not see Jack, Kate or Sawyer on the show and focus more on some of the lesser-known castaways." Spiegel went on to say that the episode was "fantastic". Mania.com's Stephen Lackey wrote that "Flashes Before Your Eyes" was an "episode has everything die hard LOST fans expect, riveting plot twists, foreshadowing, and as many questions as answers"

Critics did note that the episode did not provide many answers. Mac Slocum of FilmFodder.com wrote that he was "beginning to think the Lost producers have a different definition for the word 'answer'." Television Without Pity graded this episode with a "C".

Henry Ian Cusick and Dominic Monaghan each submitted this episode for consideration on their own behalf for Outstanding Supporting Actor in a Drama Series respectively for the 59th Primetime Emmy Awards. For their work on this episode, series co-creator, show runner, and executive producer Damon Lindelof and supervising producer Drew Goddard were nominated for the Writers Guild of America Award for Television: Episodic Drama.
