= John Locke (Lost) =

Fictional character of the TV series Lost

- Lost character
- Terry O'Quinn as John Locke in 2005.
- First appearance: "Pilot (Part 1)"
- Last appearance: "The End"
- Created by: Jeffrey Lieber; J. J. Abrams; Damon Lindelof
- Portrayed by: Terry O'Quinn, Charles Henry Wyson (young), Caleb Steinmeyer (teenager); Adewale Akinnuoye-Agbaje (dream)
- Centric episode(s): "Walkabout"; "Deus Ex Machina"; "Exodus, Part 2"; "Orientation"; "Lockdown"; "Further Instructions"; "The Man from Tallahassee"; "The Brig"; "Cabin Fever"; "The Life and Death of Jeremy Bentham"; "The Incident, Part 1"; "LA X, Parts 1 & 2"; "The Substitute"; "The Last Recruit"; "The Candidate"; "The End"

In-universe information
- Full name: John Edward Locke
- Aliases: Jeremy Bentham; Johnathan Locke
- Species: Human
- Gender: Male
- Occupation: Assistant manager at a toy store Home inspector Box company office worker Substitute teacher (flash-sideways)
- Relatives: Anthony Cooper (father); Emily Locke (mother)
- Nationality: American

John Locke is a fictional character played by Terry O'Quinn on the ABC television series Lost. He is named after the English philosopher of the same name. In 2007, O'Quinn won the Primetime Emmy Award for Outstanding Supporting Actor in a Drama Series for his portrayal of Locke.

Locke is introduced in the first season as a mysterious, intellectual and stoic character with an affinity for living out in the wild and a penchant for hunting and tracking. He believes in mystical and spiritual explanations for why things happen on the island due to an objective "miracle" happening to him after the crash of Oceanic 815. His eccentric and at times selfish behaviour results in him being repeatedly distrusted by the other survivors. His stoicism and mystical outlook dominate his character and are the basis for many of his relationships and interactions on the show.

== Arc ==
=== Prior to the crash ===
John Locke was born to teenager Emily Locke on May 30, 1956. In his early years he showed extreme promise in his intelligence. After being placed in government care as a ward of the state he found himself in a variety of foster homes. He was visited in one such home by Richard Alpert (Nestor Carbonell), who described Locke as "extremely special". Locke had a number of foster siblings over the years: Jeannie, who died as a child when she fell off of a set of monkey bars; Melissa, who was prone to bullying John; and an unnamed brother with whom Locke played the game Mouse Trap.

At age 16, Locke's high school teacher freed him from a locker and took him to his office, and kindly told him that being a sportsman, prom king, and a superhero were simply not who he was. Locke angrily replied "Don't tell me what I can't do!" It is implied here that Locke disliked being put down more than being physically bullied. The phrasing of Locke imploring figures in his life both in the show's present and in his character's past was used repeatedly throughout the series.

Around 22 years later, Locke was working in a toy store and was visited by his mother, who implied that he was conceived without a father. Curious, Locke hired a private investigator to track down the location of his father, Anthony Cooper (Kevin Tighe). Cooper welcomed Locke into his life, and the two bonded over hunting trips. Cooper soon revealed he needed a kidney transplant and Locke volunteered to donate one of his. Following the surgery Cooper abandoned Locke and refused to see him, at which point Locke found out that his father conned him for his kidney. Locke became very depressed and eventually sought group therapy, where he met his future girlfriend Helen Norwood (Katey Sagal). Helen helped Locke overcome his obsession with his father. However, Cooper later came to him for assistance and Locke helped him. Helen left Locke as a result.

Locke began living and working at a commune that grew marijuana in California until the police began an investigation. He subsequently left.

Locke retreated into a life of solitude until he was visited one day by a young man named Peter Talbot. Peter came asking for information about "Adam Seward," who intended to marry Peter's wealthy mother. Locke realized it was Cooper and met with him, ordering him to not marry Peter's mother. It is strongly implied Cooper killed Peter, although he denied it when Locke confronted him. After a struggle, he pushed Locke out of a window eight stories high. Locke hit the ground, where he was soon touched by the mysterious island inhabitant Jacob (Mark Pellegrino). Locke survived the fall but suffered a broken back, an injury that left him in a wheelchair.

While Locke recovered in the hospital, a presumed orderly named Matthew Abaddon (Lance Reddick) visited him and told him to go on a walkabout for a period of self-discovery. Once out of the hospital, Locke started working at a box company where he was constantly insulted by his boss, Randy (Billy Ray Gallion). Locke then flew to Australia, where he was denied admission on the walkabout because of his paraplegic state. He boarded Oceanic Flight 815 to return home.

=== On the island ===
After crashing on the Island in the fuselage section, Locke miraculously regains the use of the lower portion of his body below his waist. Locke becomes the most attuned toward the Island and has no intention of leaving it. It is then revealed that Locke is an expert at hunting and tracking. On a hunt he encounters the smoke monster, describing it as a "bright light". When Claire Littleton (Emilie de Ravin) is abducted, Locke helps Jack Shephard (Matthew Fox), Kate Austen (Evangeline Lilly) and Boone Carlyle (Ian Somerhalder) search for her. Whilst searching, he and Boone discover the hatch, which they then spend most of their time trying to open. During this time, Boone becomes Locke's protégé and Locke tries to teach him the nature of the Island. When Locke has a vision one night of a Beechcraft crashing, Locke and Boone then discover it lodged atop a cliff. Boone climbs up into the plane, but it falls while he is still inside. Locke carries him back to the caves and leaves him dying in Jack's care, then sneaks away to the hatch, where he bangs furiously on the door. Just as Locke loses hope, a light turns on in the hatch, and Locke sees it as a sign. Locke returns to the beach in time for Boone's funeral, and reluctantly reveals the existence of the hatch. Due to Boone's death, Jack is no longer trusting of Locke and his motives, and Boone's grieving stepsister Shannon Rutherford (Maggie Grace) attempts to shoot Locke. In order to open the hatch, the survivors are led by Danielle Rousseau to the wreckage of a ship known as the Black Rock, and find dynamite. Locke uses the dynamite to blow the hatch open.

Locke enters the hatch and discovers Desmond Hume (Henry Ian Cusick), who shows Locke and Jack an orientation film explaining that the hatch was once used for studying electromagnetism and a specific series of Numbers has to be entered into a computer every 108 minutes to prevent an unspecified catastrophe. Seeing that his replacements have arrived, Desmond leaves. While Jack is reluctant to enter the Numbers, Locke convinces him otherwise. When a man named "Henry Gale" (Michael Emerson) arrives in the jungle (captured in a trap set by Rousseau), Locke holds him prisoner in the armory. The blast doors in the hatch close, and one crushes Locke's leg. Locke tasks Henry with entering the Numbers in the computer. Locke notices a map drawn on one of the doors when the lights go out, which he manages to sketch after the blast doors open. Locke and the other survivors soon find out that Henry was lying about his identity and he is a member of the Others, but he refuses to speak to anyone but Locke. He taunts Locke by telling him that his people saw the hatch as a joke, and that he never entered the Numbers in the computer, which results in Locke starting to believe that the button is not real. When Henry escapes, Locke and Mr. Eko (Adewale Akinnuoye-Agbaje) enter the jungle to search for him but find the "?" on Locke's map, where they discover the Pearl station, which explains that pushing the button is just to test the occupants of the hatch. While Locke believes that the button is fake, Eko feels the opposite. Locke abandons pushing the button, and he and the recently returned Desmond sneak into the hatch to allow the timer to reach zero, but when the electromagnetism begins destroying the station, Locke realizes that he has been wrong all along. Desmond then turns the fail-safe key that causes the hatch to implode.

Locke awakens in the jungle the next day and constructs a sweat lodge to induce a hallucination, in which Boone tells him to rescue Eko. In order to communicate with the Others to help the captured Jack, Kate and Sawyer (Josh Holloway), he and some of the other survivors travel to the Pearl station, where they rewire the circuits in the monitors to view surveillance from another hatch. They leave the station and discover Eko dead in the jungle. After burying him, Locke notices an inscription on Eko's prayer stick instructing him to go north. After Kate returns, she, Locke, Sayid (Naveen Andrews), and Danielle (Mira Furlan) go on a mission to rescue Jack from the Others. When they arrive at the Others' village, the Barracks, Locke finds Henry (whose actual name is Ben and is the leader of the Others). Locke takes Ben hostage and forces him to show him the location of the Others' submarine. Locke then uses C-4 to blow up a submarine that Jack was going to use to get off of the Island, due to his belief that everyone should stay on it because of destiny. After this, Ben shows him his father, Anthony Cooper, whom they have captured, and tells Locke that he can join the Others if he kills his father. Locke manipulates Sawyer into murdering Cooper for him, then carries the corpse to the Others' camp. He is taken by Ben to see Jacob, but Locke is shown only an empty chair in the cabin. Locke goes into a rage, but objects suddenly began to fly around of their own accord. Ben and Locke next visit a pit full of long-deceased DHARMA members, where Ben shoots Locke, because Locke threatens his leadership of the Others. Locke is left for dead, but he wakes up days later. Locke contemplates suicide, but his faith is restored upon witnessing an apparition of Walt, who tells Locke that he's got "work to do". He makes his way to where Jack has taken the survivors, and kills Naomi, a woman from the freighter, who he believes has brought danger to the Island. He asks Jack not to communicate with the nearby freighter, but Jack ignores him and contacts it. Locke goes back to the beach camp, hoping to gain support from some of the other survivors.

The survivors split into two groups, with those believing the people from the freighter to be dangerous joining Locke. Locke attempts to carry out the work he was told to do by Walt. In order to do this he has to go to Jacob for advice, but is unable to find Jacob's cabin, so they proceed to the Barracks. For the first few days there, Ben continually taunts Locke for not having a plan, but Ben eventually explains that Charles Widmore (Alan Dale) is the man who sent the freighter, and that he wants to exploit the Island. After the village is ambushed by a group from the freighter and most of Locke's group is killed (including Rousseau and Alex), Locke leads Ben and Hurley to look for the cabin again, since Hurley claimed to see it. Locke has a dream in which the DHARMA Initiative member who built the cabin (Horace Goodspeed—Doug Hutchison) tells him that Jacob is waiting for him. In the pit containing the bodies of the DHARMA Initiative members, Locke finds a map to the cabin, which Locke, Ben, and Hurley follow. Inside the cabin, Locke does not meet Jacob, but rather Christian Shephard (John Terry) and Claire. They tell him that to save the Island he must move it. Ben leads Locke and Hurley to a DHARMA station known as the Orchid that will be able to do this, but discovers the mercenaries from the freighter waiting for Ben there, so Ben turns himself over and instructs Locke how to get in the actual station. After failing to find it, Jack arrives and Locke tries to convince Jack not to leave. Unsuccessful, he tells Jack to lie about the Island and everything that has happened in order to protect it. Ben escapes and they enter the Orchid station together, only to discover that the mercenary leader, Martin Keamy (Kevin Durand) survived his encounter with Ben and followed him back. Keamy warns Ben that he has a dead man's trigger on him and that if he dies everyone on the freighter will also, but Ben kills him anyway to avenge his daughter's death, much to Locke's horror. Ben then apologizes for making Locke's life miserable and tells Locke that he is the new leader of the Others. Locke joins the Others as Ben moves the Island, causing him to leave it.

Immediately after the Island is apparently moved, Locke finds himself along with the other island survivors traveling through time at random points indicated by a bright flash. During these flashes, he is found by Richard (Nestor Carbonell), who explains that he knew where to find him from Locke himself. He informs Locke that they will be strangers at their next meeting, and thus gives him a compass to get his younger self to trust Locke. He also tells Locke this is happening because of those that have left the Island. To get them to return, he will need to die. Later, Locke saves Juliet and Sawyer from three Others back in 1954, one of them being a young Charles Widmore. Locke convinces his group to go along with him to the Orchid station, hoping to stop the time flashes. After the group reunites with Jin (Daniel Dae Kim), they arrive at an ancient well which will lead to the Orchid station. Jin tells Locke to tell his wife Sun (Yunjin Kim) that he (Jin) died and to give her his wedding ring as proof.

=== After the Island ===
Locke leaves the Island by moving it in the Orchid and emerges three years in the future. Charles Widmore makes contact with him, provides him with the alias "Jeremy Bentham", and assigns Matthew Abaddon as his assistant to find the survivors that left the island, now known as the Oceanic Six. Locke visits Sayid, Walt Lloyd (Malcolm David Kelley), Hurley, Kate and Jack, and tells them all (with the exception of Walt) that they must return to the Island, but none agree. Ben visits Locke and tells him that he will help reunite the Oceanic Six, and then murders Locke. According to The Man in Black, Locke's final thoughts were, "I don't understand." After Locke's visit, Jack becomes convinced to return to the island, and later attends Locke's wake. Ben approaches Jack and informs him the only way to return to the Island is to bring everyone back, including Locke's corpse.

Locke's suicide note is given to Jack by Faraday's mother, Eloise Hawking. Locke's death was necessary so that his body could act as a proxy for Christian Shephard (whose body had been on the original flight) in order to recreate as closely as possible the conditions by which the Oceanic Six first found the Island. When Jack eventually brings himself to open the suicide note, it reads: "Jack, I wish that you had believed me. JL". After Flight 316 crashes on Hydra Island, Locke appears to the survivors of the crash, resurrected.

=== Back on the island ===
Locke and Ben later leave for the Island, where Ben is ordered by the smoke monster, in the guise of his dead daughter, to do everything Locke asks him. Locke and Ben locate the Others' camp and are reunited with Richard. Locke demands a meeting with Jacob, which Richard agrees to arrange. Together with Sun and the rest of the Others, the group makes its way to the base of a giant statue. Ben and Locke confront Jacob in his chamber. Jacob identifies this Locke as his nemesis, and the Man in Black provokes Ben to stab Jacob, then kicks the body into the fire. Outside the chamber, survivors from Flight 316 arrive at the campsite, where they present Richard Alpert with a box containing Locke's body, which was found in the plane's cargo hold. It is then clear that Locke is in fact dead and the smoke monster has been impersonating him since his return to the island.

Locke is buried near the original beach camp, and his eulogy is given by Ben, who calls Locke a man of faith and a better man than he'll ever be. He also says that he is truly sorry for murdering him.

Following his return to the island, Jack begins to adopt a more faith-based outlook, in contrast to his previous empirical views, and is even resentful of the Man in Black for using Locke's appearance.

=== Flash sideways ===
In the alternate timeline, Locke is still paralyzed and was denied permission to go on the walkabout; however, as he flies back on Oceanic 815 he claims to his seatmate, Boone, that he did. Boone says smilingly that he will stick with Locke if the plane crashes, but in this alternate universe the plane does not crash. Once the plane lands, Locke's suitcase of knives does not make it back with him and he meets Jack in the lost luggage department. Jack is distressed because the airline lost his father's coffin. When he complains about this to Locke, Locke consoles him that they didn't lose his father, rather just the body. Grateful for these words of comfort, Jack asks Locke how he got in the wheelchair, but Locke, instead of revealing the reason, claims that his condition is irreversible, to which Jack responds, "Nothing is irreversible". Jack hands him a business card and tells him to call if he would like a free consult to see if he can fix Locke's paralysis.

As a pretext for going to on the walkabout, Locke had used a conference that his box company had sent him to attend there. His boss Randy casually fires him for this misuse of company travel time. After clearing out his desk, he heads to the parking lot, only to find a huge Hummer blocking his van. He angrily slams on it, until Hugo "Hurley" Reyes, impeccably dressed, shows up; Hurley owns the box company as part of his wealth from winning the lottery. After an exchange about Randy, Hugo gives Locke the number to a temp agency that he also owns. Locke goes there and receives a work assignment, given by Rose Nadler, as a substitute teacher at a high school in Southern California. In the teacher's lounge he meets a European history teacher named Benjamin Linus. One day while eating lunch in the lounge, Locke suggests that Ben should apply for the position of the school's principal, because Ben is lamenting the lack of care the current principal shows for the school.

Helen, Locke's girlfriend, is alive and still with Locke. They are planning to marry in October 2004, and she suggests, when discussing having a small wedding with only Locke's father and her parents present, that Locke's father may not be the cruel con artist they knew him as before. But Locke, losing his belief in miracles, confesses to her one day that he lost his job at the box company and he thinks Helen deserves someone better. Helen tells him he is all she ever wanted, tears up Jack's business card, and affirms that she loves only him, the way he is.

In the midst of Ben Linus' alternate reality segment, Desmond deliberately runs over Locke with his car in the school parking lot. Paramedics bring Locke to the hospital, where Jack is his surgeon. Jack recognizes Locke from the airport. He tells him that upon looking at his spinal injuries, he has concluded that he is a "candidate" for elective spinal correction surgery. However, Locke refuses the operation. After Jack does some research and visits Locke's father, Anthony Cooper, he returns to Locke and asks him how he became paralyzed. Locke tells him that it was from a plane crash. He had been taking private flying lessons and asked his father to be his first passenger on his first solo flight. Unfortunately, his plane crashed upon takeoff, paralyzing both himself and Cooper (his father's injuries were much more substantial than his). He then leaves the hospital, hearing Jack tell him that he "wished he had believed in him".

After Desmond attacks Ben at their school and Locke learns he was the same man who ran him over, he slowly starts to regain his belief in destiny. Believing their meeting to be fated, he contacts Jack and decides to have the procedure done after all. The surgery is a success, and Locke quickly regains feeling in his legs. Seeing his toes move spurs the return of Locke's memories of the island; he tries to get Jack to remember as well, but Jack resists. Later, Locke arrives in his wheelchair at the church where all the survivors have gathered. After a brief conversation with Ben, who apologizes for how he treated him, Locke forgives Ben. Ben is deeply grateful for this and tells him he does not need his wheelchair any longer. Locke considers this for a moment before standing and walking inside the church. Locke is reunited with all his friends from the island, and together they all move on.

== Development and casting ==
Lost creator J. J. Abrams had worked with Terry O'Quinn previously on Alias. He was the only actor who did not have to officially audition for a part of a main character. In the episode "Cabin Fever", Charles Wyson plays Locke at age five, while Caleb Steinmeyer plays Locke at age sixteen.

Locke was not originally written with his paralysis—while writing "Tabula Rasa", Damon Lindelof suggested that John Locke was in a wheelchair before going to the island, and after an initial shock, the rest of the writing team embraced the idea and decided to foreshadow it by featuring the wheelchair in the background of that episode.

Both John Locke’s own name and his alias, Jeremy Bentham, are the names of British philosophers. However, the ideas of these philosophers are unrelated to and in some cases clash with the character on the show. Specifically, Locke's views on religion and the character's affinity for mysticism cannot be reconciled.

The term Tabula Rasa, the title of the third episode of the first season, refers to philosopher John Locke's tabula rasa thesis, an empirical conception that all individuals are born with a blank slate and build their bank of knowledge and their identity solely from their experiences and perceptions.

== Reception ==
O'Quinn's performance received critical acclaim. His portrayal of John Locke earned him the Primetime Emmy Award for Outstanding Supporting Actor in a Drama Series in 2007. IGN named him as the #1 character from the first three seasons of Lost, and Entertainment Weekly called him the 63rd-greatest character of all time in a list about both television and film. Also, he was #1 on Television Without Pity's list of the show's "10 Best Backstories” as well. TV Guide ranked him the 32nd-greatest television character ever, the second of five Lost characters on the list.

The writing for Locke in "Through the Looking Glass" was criticized, with one IGN writer objecting, "It seems irrational that he would go and [stab Naomi] in the back without explaining himself." Although not responding to the IGN comment, series co-creator Damon Lindelof has stated, "We might be willing to give [Locke] the benefit of the doubt for any action he took in response to [lying gutshot in a pit of Dharma corpses for two days and on the verge of taking his own life], even if considered slightly 'out of character'".

== See also ==
- List of Lost characters
- Nuzlocke
