= Lost (TV series) soundtracks =

The orchestral score of Lost is composed, orchestrated, and produced by Michael Giacchino and has been released on a series of soundtrack albums by Varèse Sarabande. It was conducted by Tim Simonec.

== Soundtracks ==
=== Season 1 ===
On March 21, 2006, the original television soundtrack to Lost was released by the record label Varèse Sarabande. It includes full length versions of the themes heard on the show during the first season. The track listing is as follows:

Lost (Original Television Soundtrack)

Soundtrack album by Michael Giacchino
- Released: March 21, 2006
- Genre: Soundtrack
- Length: 1:04:51
- Label: Varèse Sarabande
- Producer: Michael Giacchino

#	Track	Time	Episode
1	"Main Title" (Composed by J.J. Abrams)	0:16	N/A
2	"The Eyeland"	1:58	"Pilot"
3	"World's Worst Beach Party"	2:44	"Pilot"
4	"Credit Where Credit Is Due"	2:23	"Pilot"
5	"Run Like, Um... Hell?"	2:21	"Pilot"
6	"Hollywood and Vines"	1:52	"Pilot"
7	"Just Die Already"	1:51	"Tabula Rasa"
8	"Me and My Big Mouth"	1:06	"Tabula Rasa"
9	"Crocodile Locke"	1:49	"Walkabout"
10	"Win One for the Reaper"	2:38	"White Rabbit"
11	"Departing Sun"	2:42	"House of the Rising Sun"
12	"Charlie Hangs Around"	3:17	"All the Best Cowboys Have Daddy Issues"
13	"Navel Gazing"	3:24	"Whatever the Case May Be"
14	"Proper Motivation"	2:02	"Hearts and Minds"
15	"Run Away! Run Away!"	0:30	"Hearts and Minds"
16	"We're Friends"	1:32	"Homecoming"
17	"Getting Ethan"	1:35	"Homecoming"
18	"Thinking Clairely"	1:04	"Outlaws"
19	"Locke'd Out Again"	3:30	"Deus Ex Machina"
20	"Life and Death"	3:39	"Do No Harm"
21	"Booneral"	1:38	"The Greater Good"
22	"Shannonigans"	2:25	"The Greater Good"
23	"Kate's Motel"	2:07	"Born to Run"
24	"I've Got a Plane to Catch"	2:37	"Exodus"
25	"Monsters Are Such Innnteresting People"	1:29	"Exodus"
26	"Parting Words"	5:30	"Exodus"
27	"Oceanic 815"	6:11	"Exodus"

=== Season 2 ===
On October 3, 2006, Varèse Sarabande released another soundtrack album featuring music composed by Giacchino from the show's second season. The track listing is as follows:

Lost: Season 2 (Original Television Soundtrack)

Soundtrack album by Michael Giacchino
- Released: October 3, 2006
- Genre: Soundtrack
- Length: 1:04:48
- Label: Varèse Sarabande
- Producer: Michael Giacchino

#	Track	Time	Episode
1	"Main Title" (Composed by J.J. Abrams)	0:16	N/A
2	"Peace Through Superior Firepower"	1:26	"Man of Science, Man of Faith"
3	"The Final Countdown"	5:48	"Orientation"
4	"World's Worst Landscaping"	1:17	"Everybody Hates Hugo"
5	"Mess It All Up"	1:27	"Everybody Hates Hugo"
6	"Hurley's Handouts"	4:42	"Everybody Hates Hugo"
7	"Just Another Day on the Beach"	2:47	"The Other 48 Days"
8	"Ana Cries"	1:48	"The Other 48 Days"
9	"The Tribes Merge"	2:03	"The Other 48 Days"
10	"The Gathering"	4:19	"Collision"
11	"Shannon's Funeral"	2:12	"What Kate Did"
12	"All's Forgiven... Except Charlie"	5:19	"The 23rd Psalm"
13	"Charlie's Dream"	1:50	"Fire + Water"
14	"Charlie's Temptation"	0:51	"Fire + Water"
15	"A New Trade"	2:39	"One of Them"
16	"Mapquest"	0:39	"The Whole Truth"
17	"Claire's Escape"	3:44	"Maternity Leave"
18	"The Last to Know"	2:21	"The Whole Truth"
19	"Rose and Bernard"	2:39	"S.O.S."
20	"Toxic Avenger"	0:42	"Live Together, Die Alone"
21	"I Crashed Your Plane, Brotha"	1:45	"Live Together, Die Alone"
22	"Eko Blaster"	1:44	"Live Together, Die Alone"
23	"The Hunt"	3:57	"Live Together, Die Alone"
24	"McGale's Navy"	2:22	"Live Together, Die Alone"
25	"Bon Voyage, Traitor"	5:30	"Live Together, Die Alone"
26	"End Title"	0:32	N/A

=== Season 3 ===
Lost: Season 3 (Original Television Soundtrack)

Soundtrack album by Michael Giacchino
- Released: May 6, 2008
- Genre: Soundtrack
- Length: 2:33:55
- Label: Varèse Sarabande
- Producer: Michael Giacchino

On May 6, 2008, Varèse Sarabande released another soundtrack album featuring music composed by Giacchino from the show's third season. The soundtrack contains two discs: the first featuring selected music from the season, the second featuring the entire original score from the acclaimed season finale episodes, "Greatest Hits" and "Through the Looking Glass". At 2 hours and 34 minutes, this is the longest soundtrack released from the show.

==== Disc one ====
#	Track	Time	Episode
1	"In with a KABOOM!"	1:56	"A Tale of Two Cities"
2	"Main Title" (Composed by J.J. Abrams)	0:16	N/A
3	"Awed and Shocked"	1:34	"A Tale of Two Cities"
4	"Fool Me Twice"	3:18	"The Glass Ballerina"
5	"Pagoda of Shame"	2:02	"The Glass Ballerina"
6	"The Island"	2:57	"Further Instructions"
7	"Eko of the Past"	2:45	"The Cost of Living"
8	"Church of Eko’s"	0:58	"The Cost of Living"
9	"Leggo My Eko"	3:12	"The Cost of Living"
10	"Romancing the Cage"	1:48	"I Do"
11	"Under the Knife"	4:18	"I Do"
12	"Teaser Time"	2:52	"Not in Portland"
13	"Here Today, Gone to Maui"	4:53	"Not in Portland"
14	"Distraught Desmond"	3:36	"Flashes Before Your Eyes"
15	"Achara, Glad to See Me?"	2:25	"Stranger in a Strange Land"
16	"Ocean’s Apart"	3:02	"Stranger in a Strange Land"
17	"The Lone Hugo"	3:34	"Tricia Tanaka is Dead"
18	"Fetch Your Arm"	2:24	"Tricia Tanaka is Dead"
19	"Ain’t Talkin’ ’bout Nothin’"	2:05	"Tricia Tanaka is Dead"
20	"Shambala"	2:04	"Tricia Tanaka is Dead"
21	"Claire-a Culpa"	5:21	"Par Avion"
22	"A Touching Moment"	2:34	"The Man from Tallahassee"
23	"Sweet Exposé"	4:36	"Exposé"
24	"Storming Monster"	1:31	"Left Behind"
25	"Heart of Thawyer"	1:51	"Left Behind"
26	"Juliet is Lost"	1:28	"One of Us"
27	"Beach Blanket Bonding"	1:54	"One of Us"
28	"Rushin’ the Russian"	1:06	"D.O.C."
29	"Deadly Fertility"	2:05	"D.O.C."
30	"Dharmacide"	3:56	"The Man Behind the Curtain"

==== Disc two ====
#	Track	Time	Episode
1	"Paddle Jumper"	1:16	"Greatest Hits"
2	"She’s Dynamite"	1:16	"Greatest Hits"
3	"The Good, the Bad and the Ominous"	1:07	"Greatest Hits"
4	"Charlie’s Fate"	2:58	"Greatest Hits"
5	"Paddle Jumper Reprise"	2:12	"Greatest Hits"
6	"Ta-Ta Charlie"	1:28	"Greatest Hits"
7	"Heirloom Holiday"	1:21	"Greatest Hits"
8	"Greatest Hits"	6:03	"Greatest Hits"
9	"Flying High"	6:30	"Through the Looking Glass"
10	"The Good Shepherd"	0:58	"Through the Looking Glass"
11	"Manifesting Destiny"	0:40	"Through the Looking Glass"
12	"The Looking Glass Ceiling"	3:30	"Through the Looking Glass"
13	"Ex Marks the Jack"	2:10	"Through the Looking Glass"
14	"Jintimidating Bernard"	2:42	"Through the Looking Glass"
15	"Benomination of the Temple"	0:39	"Through the Looking Glass"
16	"An Other Dark Agenda"	0:36	"Through the Looking Glass"
17	"Kate Makes a Splash"	0:32	"Through the Looking Glass"
18	"Diving Desmond"	0:47	"Through the Looking Glass"
19	"Weapon of Mass Distraction"	0:50	"Through the Looking Glass"
20	"The Fallen Hero"	0:26	"Through the Looking Glass"
21	"Sticking to Their Guns"	0:58	"Through the Looking Glass"
22	"Torture Me Not"	2:44	"Through the Looking Glass"
23	"Through the Locke-ing Glass"	2:13	"Through the Looking Glass"
24	"The Only Pebble in the Jungle"	1:31	"Through the Looking Glass"
25	"Early Mourning Mystery"	1:54	"Through the Looking Glass"
26	"Patchy at Best"	2:04	"Through the Looking Glass"
27	"All Jack’ed Up"	0:12	"Through the Looking Glass"
28	"Hold the Phone"	3:49	"Through the Looking Glass"
29	"Code of Conduct"	1:42	"Through the Looking Glass"
30	"Act Now, Regret Later"	5:11	"Through the Looking Glass"
31	"Just What the Doctor Ordered"	1:24	"Through the Looking Glass"
32	"Hurley’s Helping Hand"	1:06	"Through the Looking Glass"
33	"Looking Glass Half Full"	4:16	"Through the Looking Glass"
34	"Jack FM"	0:30	"Through the Looking Glass"
35	"Naomi Phone Home"	4:01	"Through the Looking Glass"
36	"Flash Forward Flashback"	4:16	"Through the Looking Glass"
37	"End Title"	0:32	N/A

=== Season 4 ===
Lost: Season 4 (Original Television Soundtrack)

Soundtrack album by Michael Giacchino
- Released: May 12, 2009
- Genre: Soundtrack
- Length: 1:18:18
- Label: Varèse Sarabande
- Producer: Michael Giacchino

Varèse Sarabande released the soundtrack to Season 4 on May 12, 2009. The CD contains over 75 minutes of music.

#	Track	Time	Episode
1	"Giving up the Ghost"	2:40	"The Beginning of the End"
2	"Locke'ing Horns"	1:52	"The Beginning of the End"
3	"Lost Away — or is It?"	1:41	"The Economist"
4	"Backgammon Gambit"	1:19	"Eggtown"
5	"Time and Time Again"	2:42	"The Constant"
6	"The Constant"	3:52	"The Constant"
7	"Maternity Hell"	2:31	"Ji Yeon"
8	"Karma Jin-itiative"	1:24	"Ji Yeon"
9	"Ji Yeon"	3:09	"Ji Yeon"
10	"Michael's Right to Remain Wrong"	1:54	"Meet Kevin Johnson"
11	"Bodies and Bungalows"	1:23	"The Shape of Things to Come"
12	"Benundrum"	3:24	"The Shape of Things to Come"
13	"Hostile Negotiations"	2:21	"The Shape of Things to Come"
14	"Locke-about"	6:05	"Cabin Fever"
15	"There's No Place Like Home"	2:35	"There's No Place Like Home"
16	"Nadia on Your Life"	1:42	"There's No Place Like Home"
17	"C4-titude"	2:00	"There's No Place Like Home"
18	"Of Mice and Ben"	2:19	"There's No Place Like Home"
19	"Keamy Away from Him"	4:58	"There's No Place Like Home"
20	"Timecrunch"	2:06	"There's No Place Like Home"
21	"Can't Kill Keamy"	1:48	"There's No Place Like Home"
22	"Bobbing for Freighters"	5:20	"There's No Place Like Home"
23	"Locke of the Island"	7:07	"There's No Place Like Home"
24	"Lying for the Island"	4:53	"There's No Place Like Home"
25	"Landing Party"	3:23	"There's No Place Like Home"
26	"Hoffs-Drawlar"	3:50	"There's No Place Like Home"

=== Season 5 ===
Lost: Season 5 (Original Television Soundtrack)

Soundtrack album by Michael Giacchino
- Released: May 11, 2010
- Genre: Soundtrack
- Length: 1:18:21
- Label: Varèse Sarabande
- Producer: Michael Giacchino

The soundtrack for Season 5 was released on May 11, 2010, just over a week before the final episode of the series.

#	Track	Time	Episode
1	"Making Up for Lost Time"	3:23	"Because You Left"
2	"The Swinging Bendulum"	5:44	"The Lie"
3	"Locke's Excellent Adventure"	4:01	"The Life and Death of Jeremy Bentham"
4	"The Science of Faith"	2:19	"316"
5	"More Locke Than Locke"	3:15	"316"
6	"Together or Not Together"	4:03	"316"
7	"Through the Window"	2:08	"316"
8	"Dharma Delinquent"	1:52	"LaFleur"
9	"La Fleur"	2:37	"LaFleur"
10	"Crash and Yearn"	2:30	"Namaste"
11	"Your Kharma Hit My Dharma"	2:06	"Whatever Happened, Happened"
12	"Alex in Chains"	1:37	"Dead is Dead"
13	"I Hear Dead People"	1:54	"Some Like It Hoth"
14	"For Love of the Dame"	3:18	"The Variable"
15	"Follow the Leader"	7:51	"Follow the Leader"
16	"Sawyer Jones and the Temple of Boom"	5:16	"Follow the Leader"
17	"The Tangled Web"	1:42	"The Incident"
18	"Dharma Disaster"	5:18	"The Incident"
19	"Blessings and Bombs"	1:32	"The Incident"
20	"Jack's Swan Song"	1:16	"The Incident"
21	"Dharma vs. Lostaways"	4:24	"The Incident"
22	"The Incident"	3:09	"The Incident"
23	"Jacob's Stabber"	7:32	"The Incident"

=== Season 6 ===
Lost: The Final Season (Original Television Soundtrack)

Soundtrack album by Michael Giacchino
- Released: September 14, 2010
- Genre: Soundtrack
- Length: 2:28:28
- Label: Varèse Sarabande
- Producer: Michael Giacchino

The soundtrack for the final season was released on September 14, 2010. It is a two-disc album like the Season 3 soundtrack and features two and a half hours of music. Giacchino had written a number of new themes for season 6 including those for the Man in Black, the Temple, Richard, the Source and the flash-sideways characters. None of the music from the last four episodes of the series is included in this release except for the two bonus tracks from the finale.

==== Disc one ====
#	Track	Time	Episode
1	A Sunken Feeling	1:34	"LA X"
2	Heavy Metal Crew	1:01	"LA X"
3	Doing Jacob's Work	1:58	"LA X"
4	Smokey and the Bandits	4:55	"LA X"
5	LAX	4:08	"LA X"
6	Temple and Spring	1:53	"LA X"
7	Locke at it This Way	1:37	"LA X"
8	Richard the Floored	1:55	"LA X"
9	Coffin Calamity	3:46	"LA X"
10	Lie Thou There	2:30	"LA X"
11	Trouble is My First Name	1:51	"LA X"
12	Death Springs Eternal	6:23	"LA X"
13	The Rockets' Red Glare	3:34	"LA X"
14	Temple and Taxi	3:37	"What Kate Does"
15	My Orca	0:40	"What Kate Does"
16	Helen of Joy	2:00	"The Substitute"
17	Jacob's Ladders	3:26	"The Substitute"
18	The Substitute	4:45	"The Substitute"
19	Peculiar Parenting	2:54	"Lighthouse"
20	Door Jammer	0:42	"Lighthouse"
21	The Lighthouse	3:33	"Lighthouse"
22	Sundown	7:37	"Sundown"
23	Catch a Falling Star	1:46	"Sundown"
24	Linus and Alpertinent	2:27	"Dr. Linus"
25	Karma Has No Price	4:11	"Dr. Linus"

==== Disc two ====
#	Track	Time	Episode
1	Recon	3:23	"Recon"
2	Crazy Town	2:01	"Recon"
3	None the Richard	1:20	"Ab Aeterno"
4	Love in a Time of Pneumonia	1:35	"Ab Aeterno"
5	The Fall of Man	2:58	"Ab Aeterno"
6	Dead Man Talking	1:18	"Ab Aeterno"
7	Jacob's Advocate	5:50	"Ab Aeterno"
8	Standing Offer	1:20	"Ab Aeterno"
9	And Death Shall Have No Dominion	3:54	"Ab Aeterno"
10	Sayid After Dentist	1:49	"The Package"
11	Shepharding Sun	2:16	"The Package"
12	Tesla Tester	2:33	"Happily Ever After"
13	George of the Concrete Jungle	1:09	"Happily Ever After"
14	World's Worst Car Wash	2:00	"Happily Ever After"
15	None the Nurse	3:48	"Happily Ever After"
16	Happily Ever After	1:57	"Happily Ever After"
17	Hugo Reyes of Light	1:41	"Everybody Loves Hugo"
18	Passing the Torch	3:40	"Everybody Loves Hugo"
19	A Memorable Kiss	1:23	"Everybody Loves Hugo"
20	The Last Recruit	4:07	"The Last Recruit"
21	Kool-Aid Claire	1:19	"The Last Recruit"
22	The Sub Group	3:50	"The Last Recruit"
23	Sunny Outlook	0:40	"The Last Recruit"
24	Reunion and Reneging	2:58	"The Last Recruit"
25	The Hole Shabang	7:02	"The End"
26	Moving On	7:54	"The End"

=== The Last Episodes ===
Lost: The Last Episodes (Original Television Soundtrack)

Soundtrack album by Michael Giacchino
- Released: October 11, 2010
- Genre: Soundtrack
- Length: 2:29:46
- Label: Varèse Sarabande
- Producer: Michael Giacchino

==== Disc one ====
#	Track	Time	Episode
1	Cage Crashers	0:45	"The Candidate"
2	Shephard's Why	1:08	"The Candidate"
3	Sub-Primed	6:33	"The Candidate"
4	SS Lost-tanic	6:56	"The Candidate"
5	Flew the Coop	2:06	"The Candidate"
6	Across the Sea	1:54	"Across the Sea"
7	Don't Look at the Light	3:31	"Across the Sea"
8	A Brother's Quarrel	2:58	"Across the Sea"
9	Make Like a Tree	6:10	"Across the Sea"
10	Mother of a Plan	5:14	"Across the Sea"
11	Mother of Sorrows	3:56	"Across the Sea"
12	Love Is Stronger Than Death	2:51	"Across the Sea"
13	Cereal Experience	2:25	"What They Died For"
14	The Four Amigos	1:13	"What They Died For"
15	Walk and Talk and Aah!	2:31	"What They Died For"
16	Hide and Snitch	3:00	"What They Died For"
17	A Better Ben	1:56	"What They Died For"
18	What They Died For	3:30	"What They Died For"
19	Jack's Cup Runneth Over	1:41	"What They Died For"
20	Get Out of Jail Free Card	3:10	"What They Died For"

==== Disc two ====
#	Track	Time	Episode
1	Parallelocam	3:23	"The End"
2	Leaver-age	1:10	"The End"
3	The Stick with Me Speech	3:05	"The End"
4	Ultrasonic Flash	2:52	"The End"
5	Fly By Dire	0:52	"The End"
6	Down the Hobbit Hole	4:34	"The End"
7	Dysfunctional Setup	2:15	"The End"
8	The Well of Holes	3:21	"The End"
9	Pulling Out All the Stops	2:28	"The End"
10	Blood from a Locke	0:33	"The End"
11	Our Lady of Perpetual Labor	4:35	"The End"
12	If a Tree Falls	2:56	"The End"
13	Locke v. Jack	2:21	"The End"
14	Can't Keep Locke Down	2:51	"The End"
15	The Long Kiss Goodbye	5:29	"The End"
16	We Can Go Dutch	2:28	"The End"
17	Kate Flashes Jack	1:13	"The End"
18	Hurley's Coronation	2:47	"The End"
19	The Hole Shabang	7:29	"The End"
20	Aloha	1:12	"The End"
21	Closure	8:08	"The End"
22	Jumping Jack's Flash	0:56	"The End"
23	Moving On	7:53	"The End"
24	Parting Words (Drive Shaft) (Bonus Track)	3:32	"The End"
25	Moving On (Alternate, with Ukulele) (iTunes Bonus)	7:55	N/A
