= Leslie Arzt (Lost) =

Lost character

- Lost character
- Daniel Roebuck as Leslie Arzt on Day 43
- First appearance: "Born to Run" (2005)
- Last appearance: "Dr. Linus" (2010)
- Portrayed by: Daniel Roebuck
- Centric episode(s): "Exposé"

In-universe information
- Species: Human
- Gender: Male
- Occupation: Science teacher
- Origin: Jersey City, New Jersey, U.S.

Dr. Leslie Arzt is a fictional character portrayed by Daniel Roebuck on the ABC television series Lost. He was a middle section survivor of Oceanic Flight 815 and became part of the beach camp. Arzt appears as a recurring character during the first season, where he was a high school science teacher known for his knowledge of insects and other forms of wildlife. He provided scientific explanations about the Island's unusual environment and studied various species discovered by the survivors.

Unlike many survivors introduced during the crash, Arzt was not shown during the initial crash sequence. His absence from the crash scene was similar to later-introduced survivors such as Nikki and Paulo. Arzt later appears in the flash-sideways timeline shown during the sixth season, which he works as a science teacher at the same school as Benjamin Linus (Michael Emerson), where the two characters briefly interact.

Arzt notable appearance occurs in the second-part episode "Exodus", where he assists Jack Shephard (Matthew Fox) and other survivors in their attempt to retrieve dynamite from the Black Rock, an old British sailing ship located on the Island. While handling the dynamite, Arzt accidentally causes an explosion and is killed. He was the first character in the series to be killed in an explosion, before Ilana Verdansky (Zuleikha Robinson) was later killed in a similar manner.

== Arc ==
Originally from Jersey City, New Jersey, Arzt was a science teacher at Washington Tustin High School who had been married three times. Before the crash of Oceanic Flight 815, he met a woman online who used a photograph of his friend. The two planned to meet in Sydney, but she disappeared after Arzt ordered lobster at a restaurant. Afterward, Arzt decided not to explore the city and instead booked an earlier flight home, which led him to board Oceanic Flight 815. While at the airport, Arzt encountered several future survivors before boarding the plane. He was seen near Hugo "Hurley" Reyes (Jorge Garcia) as Hurley rushed to make the flight and later helped the pregnant Claire Littleton (Emilie de Ravin) store her luggage in the overhead compartment.

After surviving the crash, Arzt became one of the background survivors who lived on the beach. He was later seen helping other survivors and expressing his concerns about the group's decisions. When Jack Shephard attempted to move the survivors to the caves, Arzt questioned his leadership but changed his opinion after hearing the island's mysterious monster nearby. Arzt developed an interest in the island's wildlife and maintained a collection of insects and arachnids that he believed included previously undiscovered species. He explained his findings to fellow survivor Nikki Fernandez (Kiele Sanchez) and helped her identify a dangerous spider species. He also attempted to impress her, although his efforts were unsuccessful.

During preparations for the raft intended to leave the island, Arzt warned Michael Dawson (Harold Perrineau) about changing wind patterns and claimed his knowledge came from his scientific background. He later admitted that he exaggerated the information to encourage Michael to leave quickly, explaining that he wanted the rescue mission to succeed. When John Locke (Terry O'Quinn) suggested using dynamite from the Black Rock to open the Dharma Initiative hatch, Arzt joined Jack, Locke, Kate Austen (Evangeline Lilly), and other survivors because he believed he had the knowledge necessary to safely handle explosives. Despite warning the group about the danger of the unstable dynamite, Arzt accidentally triggered a stick while explaining proper safety procedures and was killed instantly by the explosion. Following his death, Hurley joked about the incident by telling Jack that he had "some Arzt on [his] shirt." Later, Nikki took Arzt's collection of insects, including the spider species he had described earlier, which became relevant to her plan involving Paulo (Rodrigo Santoro).

In season six premiere the flash-sideways timeline, Arzt pesters Hurley into doing an impression from a commercial, which he finds hilarious. Curious, Arzt asks how Hurley came to own the company. After learning that Hurley won the lottery, a dejected Arzt excuses himself. Still working as a science teacher at Washington Tustin High School, Arzt worked alongside Benjamin Linus (Michael Emerson), and the two discussed problems at the school, including a lack of resources and dissatisfaction with principal Don Reynolds (William Atherton). Arzt later helped Ben investigate Reynolds in exchange for new laboratory equipment and a better parking space.

== Development ==
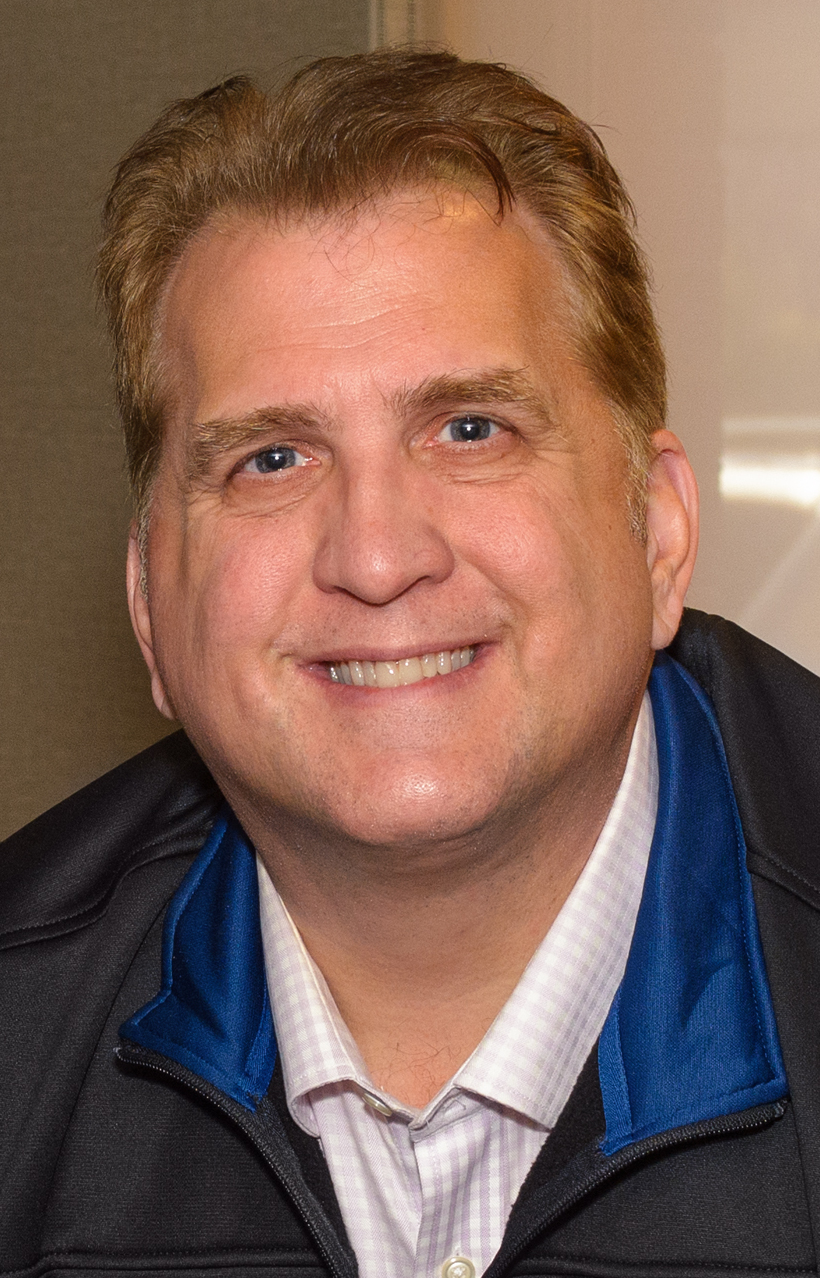
According to Roebuck, he accepted the role of Leslie Arzt without reading a script.

Arzt was portrayed by Daniel Roebuck, who was initially cast as a recurring character. Unlike many of the major survivors of Oceanic Flight 815, Arzt did not receive an extensive backstory during the show's early episodes. His primary function was as a comedic character and as the group's source of scientific knowledge, particularly during the mission to retrieve dynamite from the Black Rock. His role also highlighted the large number of unnamed survivors who existed outside the show's central characters.

Roebuck said he did not know much about the role when he joined the series as Leslie Arzt, a high school science teacher. He recalled that he accepted the part without reading a script, mainly because the production would take place in Hawaii. Roebuck had previously worked with executive producer Carlton Cuse on Nash Bridges, which helped lead to his casting. He described the cast as welcoming when he joined late in the first season, although the makeup process transformed him to look different from the other survivors. The character's death scene became one of Arzt's most recognized moments. Roebuck said he was proud of the audience reaction to the scene, including the response during a Comic-Con screening of the show's death reel.

Roebuck reprised the role in the flash-sideways timeline during the final season, where Arzt appeared as a teacher alongside Ben Linus and John Locke. Roebuck joked that the events of the series could have been a dream experienced by his character. He also returned for a commentary feature released alongside the season six premiere. ABC released a version of the two-part episode "LA X" featuring Roebuck providing behind-the-scenes commentary and discussing production details from the series. He also discussed production details, including background actors and his previous work with L. Scott Caldwell, who played Rose Nadler.

== Reception ==
Critics described Arzt as an example of the show's willingness to remove characters unexpectedly, despite his limited role compared with the main survivors. Writing for Slate, Dana Stevens described Arzt as an "overlooked" survivor whose complaints about the divide between the main cast and the other crash survivors offered a different perspective on the series. Stevens said the character represented the largely unseen survivors who remained in the background throughout much of the story. It also pointed to the irony of Arzt being killed while explaining how to handle dynamite safely.

Cyriaque Lamar of Gizmodo, discussed Arzt's death as a darkly comedic moment, noting the irony of his explosion occurring during a safety explanation involving dynamite. The article also described the phrase "getting arzted" as a humorous term inspired by his unexpected death. Ryan Smith of Comic Book Resources, included Arzt among notable side characters from Lost, describing him as one of the show's memorable supporting figures despite his short appearance. Ranker placed Arzt at number 12 on its list of Lost guest characters who deserved more screen time. The article cited his scientific expertise, his memorable death while handling dynamite, and his later flashback appearances as reasons he became a cult favorite.
