= Ab Aeterno =

- Lost episode
- In his flashback, Richard (Nestor Carbonell) heads to the recently destroyed statue to kill Jacob.
- Episode no.: Season 6 Episode 9
- Directed by: Tucker Gates
- Written by: Melinda Hsu Taylor; Greggory Nations
- Production code: 609
- Original air date: March 23, 2010
- Running time: 47 minutes

Guest appearances
- Mark Pellegrino as Jacob; Mirelly Taylor as Isabella; Juan Carlos Cantu as Father Suarez; Izzy Diaz as Ignacio; Santiago Montone as Prisoner; Titus Welliver as the Man in Black; Steven Elder as Jonas Whitfield; Jose Yenque as Doctor; Davo Coria as Servant; Sonya Masinovsky as Nurse

Episode chronology
← Previous "Recon"	Next → "The Package"
- Lost season 6

"Ab Aeterno" is the ninth television episode of the American Broadcasting Company's sixth season of the serial drama television series Lost and 112th episode overall. The episode aired on March 23, 2010.

In an extended flashback, after the death of his wife, Richard Alpert (Nestor Carbonell) arrives on the island as a slave on the Black Rock in the 19th century. He then encounters the Man in Black (Titus Welliver) and Jacob (Mark Pellegrino), both of whom offer him different deals in exchange for his allegiance.

The title is Latin for "from eternity", a phrase used to mean "since the beginning" or "for long ages" (very loosely translated as "your life now will be either heaven or hell throughout eternity"); this references the agelessness granted to Richard by Jacob as a reward for his service. "Ab Aeterno" was watched by 9 million American viewers and received critical acclaim by critics and audiences alike.

== Plot ==
Prior to her arrival on the island in 2007, Ilana (Zuleikha Robinson) is visited by Jacob in a Russian hospital, where he tells her to protect his remaining candidates (continuing from her flashback in "The Incident"). Following the events of "Dr. Linus", Ilana explains to the survivors that Jack Shephard (Matthew Fox), Sun Kwon (Yunjin Kim) and Hugo "Hurley" Reyes (Jorge Garcia) are candidates to replace Jacob, who was recently murdered by Ben, as protector of the island. When asked what to do next, she says that Richard Alpert (Nestor Carbonell) knows. Richard, who has become suicidal since Jacob's death, says he does not know and leaves the camp.

Richard’s origins begin in 1867; known as Ricardo, he lives in Tenerife with his dying wife, Isabella (Mirelly Taylor). He travels to a doctor to get medicine, but the doctor refuses Ricardo's meager payment, and Ricardo accidentally kills the man when they struggle. Ricardo returns home to find his wife has already died while he was away, and he is arrested for murdering the doctor. In prison, he is visited by a priest (Juan Carlos Cantu), who states he cannot be forgiven and will be hanged. However, learning that Ricardo has been learning English, the priest allows Ricardo to be taken as a slave to the New World aboard the Black Rock. En route, the ship is caught in a storm and a tsunami sweeps it onto the Island; it crashes through the statue of Taweret, while the Black Rock crashes into the jungle.

The next day, the crew members begin executing the captives, but the smoke monster saves Ricardo's life by killing the workers, but leaves Ricardo chained. As he works to free himself, a vision of his wife tells him they are in Hell. She is then apparently killed by the smoke monster. After six days, the Man in Black appears and frees Ricardo. Revealing that he is the smoke monster, he claims that Jacob is the devil, and that Ricardo must kill Jacob to leave the island and get his wife back. Ricardo attempts to kill Jacob, but is easily outmaneuvered.

Jacob explains the function of the island, using a wine bottle as an analogy: the island acts as a cork that keeps "the darkness" from escaping and spreading. The Man in Black believes people are inherently corrupt, while Jacob believes they are inherently good. To this end, Jacob brings people to the island, so they may disprove the Man in Black; however, he does not believe in telling people what to do, since this would negate their free will. When Ricardo points out that the Man in Black can corrupt others, with himself as an example, Jacob suggests Ricardo become his representative. He offers to reward Ricardo with anything he wants in return. After Jacob admits he cannot bring Isabella back or absolve Ricardo of his sins, Ricardo asks to live forever so that he never has to go to Hell- something that Jacob can grant him. Ricardo returns to the Man in Black, who states that his offer will always be open. He gives Ricardo the cross necklace that Isabella gave him just before she died, and Ricardo buries it on the island.

Back to 2007, Richard visits the site where he has buried his wife's necklace, shouting that he has changed his mind and wishes to join the Man in Black. Instead, Hurley arrives and communicates with the dead Isabella, acting as an intermediary between Richard and his wife. She explains that Richard must stop the Man in Black from leaving the island. The Man in Black, in the form of John Locke (Terry O'Quinn), watches them from a distance.

In another flashback, Jacob visits the Man in Black and tells him that he will never let him leave the island. The Man in Black insists he'll kill Jacob some day, but Jacob retorts that someone else will take his place; the former responds that he will simply kill them too. Jacob then gives him the corked wine bottle, which the Man in Black breaks.

== Production ==
The episode was written by producer Melinda Hsu Taylor and co-producer Greggory Nations and directed by Tucker Gates. The episode is centered on Richard Alpert and is the first episode in season six to return to the old traditional flashback and to not show a "flash-sideways". Despite Alpert being the centric character, centric flashbacks are also shown for Ilana Verdansky and The Man in Black (furthermore, Jacob plays large roles in all three characters' backstories).

== Reception ==
"Ab Aeterno" was met with critical acclaim. Review aggregate website Metacritic gave the episode a score of 93 out of 100, indicating "Universal Acclaim". The score was up on the previous week's score of 76, making the episode tied for the highest-reviewed episode of the season, along with "Happily Ever After". IGN's Chris Carbot highly praised the episode, stating "the overall story of Lost benefits immensely from the clarity that this week’s episode provides." Overall, he gave the episode a score of 9.8. Emily VanDerWerff of Los Angeles Times gave the episode a perfect score, calling it "awesome" and "another all-timer for the show." Maureen Ryan of Chicago Tribune also praised the episode, stating "what was great about "Ab [Aeterno]" is that it showed us a story about one imperfect, well-intentioned man caught up in this terrible struggle." Steven Kurutz of The Wall Street Journal deemed it as one of the best hours of TV, "Richard’s story was so dramatic that I found it totally compelling. Tonight’s show both told a self-contained story and worked within the larger framework of the show by illuminating the power struggle between Jacob and Smokey."

Critics also praised Nestor Carbonell's performance as Richard. Alan Sepinwell of Star Ledger stated "for three-plus seasons, Richard's been the serene, all-knowing man of mystery, and Carbonell was superb at showing both a cracked, suicidal Richard who has decided he actually knows nothing, and then at showing the very human man he was before Jacob made him immortal." Chris Carabott called Carbonell's performance "outstanding." James Poniewozik of Time thought Carbonell "made Richard into another character, showing us the decent, desperate, heartbroken man who would be transformed over 140 years as Jacob's ambassador on the Island."
