= The Package (Lost) =

- Lost episode
- Episode no.: Season 6 Episode 10
- Directed by: Paul Edwards
- Written by: Paul Zbyszewski; Graham Roland
- Production code: 610
- Original air date: March 30, 2010
- Running time: 42 minutes

Guest appearances
- Alan Dale as Charles Widmore; Kevin Durand as Martin Keamy; Andrew Divoff as Mikhail Bakunin; Sheila Kelley as Zoe; Anthony Azizi as Omar; Fred Koehler as Seamus; Chad Donella as Desk clerk; Larry Joshua as Burditt; Natalie Garcia Fryman as Ms. Kendall

Episode chronology
← Previous "Ab Aeterno"	Next → "Happily Ever After"
- Lost season 6

"The Package" is the tenth television episode of the American Broadcasting Company's sixth season of the serial drama television series Lost and 113th episode overall. The episode was aired on March 30, 2010, on ABC in the United States. The episode was written by producer Paul Zbyszewski and story editor Graham Roland. The episode is centered on Sun-Hwa Kwon and Jin-Soo Kwon.

In 2007, Jin-Soo Kwon (Daniel Dae Kim) is captured by Charles Widmore's (Alan Dale) men (unknown to Widmore), leading the Man in Black (Terry O'Quinn) to declare war with Widmore. Meanwhile, Sun-Hwa Kwon (Yunjin Kim) suffers aphasia. In the "flash-sideways", Sun & Jin's relationship puts them into harm's way.

== Plot ==
=== 2004 (flash-sideways timeline) ===
At the airport, Jin-Soo Kwon (Daniel Dae Kim) is released by security after the incident about his undeclared $25,000 is resolved. His watch is returned, but the money is not, as Jin needs to fill out the paperwork declaring its purpose. Having missed his appointment at the restaurant, he checks into a hotel with Sun-Hwa Paik (Yunjin Kim). In this timeline, Jin and Sun are not married. Instead, they have become secretly romantically involved.

The next day, Martin Keamy (Kevin Durand), his associate Omar (Anthony Azizi), and translator Mikhail Bakunin (Andrew Divoff) arrive at the hotel to collect the watch and the money. Since they lack the money, Sun offers to pay from a private account. Keamy sends her with Mikhail to get the money, but they learn that the account was closed by Mr. Paik, Sun's father. Meanwhile, Jin is tied up in the storeroom at the restaurant. Keamy reveals that the $25,000 was his payment for killing Jin, as Mr. Paik found out about his relationship with Sun. After shooting Keamy and his men, Sayid Jarrah (Naveen Andrews) finds Jin tied up. (Note: Shown from Sayid's point of view in "Sundown".) He hands Jin a box cutter to free himself and leaves. When Mikhail returns with Sun, Jin holds him at gunpoint. Mikhail fights back, and in the ensuing struggle, Jin shoots him dead. Sun is also hit by stray fire. As Jin picks Sun up to take her to the hospital, she reveals she is pregnant.

=== 2007 (original timeline) ===
On the beach, Ilana (Zuleikha Robinson) is waiting for Richard Alpert (Nestor Carbonell) to return, confident that he will know what to do. Meanwhile, Sun, upset by Ilana's inability to find Jin, storms off to her garden. There, she is greeted by the Man in Black (Terry O'Quinn), who offers to take her to Jin. Unwilling to trust him, she runs for the beach, knocking herself out against a tree branch on the way. The head injury leaves her unable to speak English, though still able to understand it.

Richard returns with Hugo "Hurley" Reyes (Jorge Garcia), having decided on a course of action. Knowing that the plane on Hydra Island is the only means for the Man in Black to escape, he intends to destroy it. Sun is opposed to the idea, having come back to the island to retrieve Jin. Jack Shephard (Matthew Fox) convinces her that they will find Jin and use the plane to get everyone home.

Meanwhile, the Man in Black reveals to Claire Littleton (Emilie de Ravin) that he needs to gather all the remaining candidates, or he will be unable to leave the island. Before leaving to retrieve Sun, the Man in Black speaks with Sayid Jarrah, who reveals he no longer feels any sort of emotion. When the Man in Black leaves, the camp is attacked by the team hired by Charles Widmore (Alan Dale). They tranquilize the group and take Jin to the Hydra island. Jin awakens inside Room 23 and Zoe (Sheila Kelley) shows him a grid map the DHARMA Initiative used to identify pockets of electromagnetism. Knowing that Jin was once a member of DHARMA, Zoe asks Jin for his help. However, Jin demands to see Widmore.

The Man in Black and Sayid take a boat to Hydra Island to confront Widmore. When Widmore denies having taken Jin, the Man in Black warns him that war has come to the island and returns to his camp. Sayid is left behind to spy on them. Angry about the fact that Zoe has taken Jin ahead of schedule, Widmore orders her to bring the "package" from the submarine. Widmore gives Sun's digital camera to Jin, which has photos of his daughter. Widmore explains that he has come to the island to stop the Man in Black from escaping. He then says that Jin needs to meet the "package", a person they brought to the island. Spying on Widmore's team in the water, Sayid witnesses a drugged Desmond Hume (Henry Ian Cusick) being dragged out of the submarine.

== Reception ==
"The Package" was met with positive reviews. Review aggregate website Metacritic gave the episode a score of 72 out of 100, indicating "Generally Favorable Reviews". The score was down on the previous week's score of 93.
