= The Last Recruit =

- Lost episode
- Claire (Emilie de Ravin) confronts the other survivors as they attempt to escape from the Man in Black
- Episode no.: Season 6 Episode 13
- Directed by: Stephen Semel
- Written by: Paul Zbyszewski; Graham Roland
- Production code: 613
- Original air date: April 20, 2010
- Running time: 42 minutes

Guest appearances
- Andrea Gabriel as Nadia Jazeem; Sheila Kelley as Zoe; Kimberley Joseph as Cindy Chandler; Dylan Minnette as David Shephard; Steve Boatright as Mike; Mickey Graue as Zack; Kiersten Havelock as Emma; Teresa Huang as Surgeon; Skyler Stone as EMT; Todd Coolidge as EMT; Yvonne Midkiff as Receptionist; Christopher Amitrano as Burditt; Kasim Saul as Guard

Episode chronology
← Previous "Everybody Loves Hugo"	Next → "The Candidate"
- Lost season 6

"The Last Recruit" is the 13th television episode of the American Broadcasting Company's sixth season of the serial drama television series Lost and 116th episode overall. The episode was aired on April 20, 2010, on ABC in the United States. The episode was written by producer Paul Zbyszewski and story editor Graham Roland and directed by editor Stephen Semel. Although the episode is not specifically centered on someone, Jack Shephard, Sun-Hwa Kwon, Claire Littleton, Jin-Soo Kwon, John Locke, Sayid Jarrah and James "Sawyer" Ford have points of view in the flash-sideways universe.

In the flash-sideways timeline, multiple revelations occur: Jack Shephard (Matthew Fox) and his son, David (Dylan Minnette), meet his half-sister Claire Littleton (Emilie de Ravin); Sayid Jarrah (Naveen Andrews) is captured by Detectives James "Sawyer" Ford (Josh Holloway) and Miles Straume (Ken Leung); Jin Kwon (Daniel Dae Kim), Sun Kwon (Yunjin Kim) and John Locke (Terry O'Quinn) enter the same hospital. In 2007, upon the arrival of Hurley's (Jorge Garcia) group, Sawyer double-crosses The Man in Black (also O'Quinn) and initiates his plan, bringing Kate (Evangeline Lilly), Claire and Hurley's group in the process.

== Plot ==
=== 2004 (flash-sideways timeline) ===
John Locke (Terry O'Quinn) is rushed to the hospital after being run over by Desmond Hume (Henry Ian Cusick). (Note: As depicted in Everybody Loves Hugo".) Sun-Hwa Kwon (Yunjin Kim) is taken to the same hospital, and upon seeing Locke, she seems to remember him and becomes frightened.

In the police station, James "Sawyer" Ford (Josh Holloway) interrogates Kate Austen (Evangeline Lilly). Kate figures out that Sawyer did not arrest her at LAX because he did not want anyone to know he was in Australia. Miles Straume (Ken Leung) calls Sawyer over about the multiple homicide at a restaurant of Martin Keamy (Kevin Durand) and three of his associates. Miles shows Sawyer a surveillance image, which shows Sayid Jarrah (Naveen Andrews) leaving the scene.

Desmond meets Claire Littleton (Emilie de Ravin) while she is on her way to another adoption meeting. Remembering each other from the airport, he persuades her to meet his lawyer for the well-being of her child, and he promises it will not cost her. Upon introducing herself to the lawyer, Ilana Verdansky (Zuleikha Robinson), Claire is told that she has been looking for her. Jack Shephard (Matthew Fox) also turns up at the office with his son, and learns that Claire is his half-sister and is also a beneficiary of their father's will. Jack then gets an urgent call from the hospital and has to reschedule.

Sayid arrives at Nadia (Andrea Gabriel)'s house and attempts to leave, but is apprehended by Sawyer and Miles. Sun wakes up, and Jin Kwon (Daniel Dae Kim) informs her that the baby is okay. As Jack is preparing to operate on Locke, he recognizes him.

=== 2007 (original timeline) ===
The Man in Black asks Jack to speak with him, admitting to impersonating Jack's father since Jack first arrived on the island. Zoe (Sheila Kelley) eventually arrives and demands to have Desmond returned. If they refuse, she will have them destroyed by mortars, which she demonstrates by having her camp fire a single round nearby. The Man in Black gives Sawyer a map to a boat and asks to meet at a rendezvous point where he will be waiting with the rest of the camp. However, Sawyer plans on betraying the Man in Black by making his deal with Charles Widmore and tells Jack to bring Hugo "Hurley" Reyes (Jorge Garcia), Frank Lapidus (Jeff Fahey), and Sun along to a different point as they are all leaving. Sawyer and Kate then take off and find the boat. The Man in Black tells Sayid to kill Desmond if he still wants Nadia back. Sayid goes to the well and finds Desmond at the bottom. Sayid says that the Man in Black promised to bring Nadia back to life, and believes this is possible because he himself was brought back.

As his group travels to the point where Sawyer is supposed to pick them up, the Man in Black finds Sayid, and questions whether he killed Desmond. Sayid claims he has. Jack sneaks away with Hurley, Sun and Lapidus, but Claire sees them and follows. Once they reach the boat, Claire holds them at gunpoint. However, Kate convinces her to join them. Once on the boat, Jack tells Sawyer that leaving the island is a mistake, and jumps into the sea. After swimming back ashore, he sees the Man in Black and the rest of the group waiting.

On Hydra island, Sun is reunited with Jin and regains her ability to speak English. However, Widmore betrays Sawyer and has artillery shells fired in an effort to kill the Man in Black. Jack is injured by an explosion on the beach and the Man in Black carries him into the jungle. The Man in Black then tells Jack not to worry, as he is with him now.

== Reception ==
The episode received mostly positive reviews. Review aggregate website Metacritic gave the episode a score of 73 out of 100, indicating "Generally Favorable Reviews". The score was down on the previous week's score of 83.
