= Recon (Lost) =

- Lost episode
- Sawyer (Josh Holloway) explores the crash site of Ajira Airways Flight 316.
- Episode no.: Season 6 Episode 8
- Directed by: Jack Bender
- Written by: Elizabeth Sarnoff; Jim Galasso
- Production code: 608
- Original air date: March 16, 2010
- Running time: 43 minutes

Guest appearances
- Alan Dale as Charles Widmore; Rebecca Mader as Charlotte Lewis; Kimberley Joseph as Cindy Chandler; Sheila Kelley as Zoe; Mickey Graue as Zack; Kiersten Havelock as Emma; Neil Hopkins as Liam Pace; Jodi Lyn O'Keefe as Ava; Fred Koehler as Seamus; Christopher Johnson as Police officer; Allen Cole as Sergeant; Michael Green as Lawyer

Episode chronology
← Previous "Dr. Linus"	Next → "Ab Aeterno"
- Lost season 6

"Recon" is the eighth television episode of the American Broadcasting Company's sixth season of the serial drama television series Lost and 111th episode overall. The episode is written by executive producer Elizabeth Sarnoff and newcomer Jim Galasso and directed by Jack Bender. The episode focuses on James "Sawyer" Ford.

In 2007, The Man in Black (Terry O'Quinn) tasks James "Sawyer" Ford (Josh Holloway) to recon the Ajira Airways Flight 316 plane and passengers. Meanwhile, Kate Austen (Evangeline Lilly) faces an insane Claire Littleton (Emilie de Ravin). In a "flash-sideways", Detective James Ford's past issues conflict with his present life.

The episode received mostly positive reviews, despite it being the lowest-watched episode of the season, with 8.87 million viewers.

== Plot ==
=== 2004 (flash-sideways timeline) ===
James "Sawyer" Ford (Josh Holloway) is a detective for the LAPD, along with his partner Miles Straume (Ken Leung). He is searching for Anthony Cooper, the man who conned his parents, causing his father to kill his mother and then himself (as seen in "Outlaws"). He has recently traveled to Australia in his search, telling Miles that he was instead in Palm Springs. Miles arranges for Sawyer to go on a blind date with Charlotte Lewis (Rebecca Mader). The two hit it off rather well. However, after having sex, Charlotte discovers Sawyer's folder containing information on Cooper, leading Sawyer to angrily throw her out. Miles confronts Sawyer the next day for lying about going to Australia and decides to stop being Sawyer's partner. After realizing how lonely he is, Sawyer visits Charlotte, who turns him down. Sawyer decides to open up about his past to Miles, right when a car being driven by Kate Austen (Evangeline Lilly), a fugitive, crashes into his own. He chases her down, leading him to recognize her from their encounter in "LA X".

=== 2007 (original timeline) ===
Following the events of the episode "Sundown", The Man in Black (Terry O'Quinn) leads the Others he has recruited, along with Sayid Jarrah (Naveen Andrews), Claire Littleton (Emilie de Ravin) and Kate, to rendezvous with his other recruit, Sawyer, who is tending to an injured Jin Kwon (Daniel Dae Kim). The Man in Black sends Sawyer on a reconnaissance mission to the smaller Hydra Island to spy on the survivors of Ajira Airways Flight 316. Back at the camp, Claire attempts to kill Kate while Sayid watches impassively, forcing The Man in Black to break up the fight. The Man in Black later explains to Kate that he told Claire the Others took Aaron in order to give Claire something to "hold on to". He also compares himself to Aaron, stating that his own mother was crazy. Claire later apologizes to Kate and thanks her for taking care of Aaron.

On the Hydra Island, Sawyer finds all the passengers dead and encounters a woman named Zoe (Sheila Kelley), who claims to be the only remaining survivor of Flight 316. Sawyer realizes she is lying; a cavalcade of armed men appear and escort him to their leader, Charles Widmore (Alan Dale), who has returned on a submarine. Sawyer makes a deal with Widmore: he will lead the Man in Black into a trap in exchange for safe passage away from the island. Sawyer travels back to the main island and tells the Man in Black about the deal he made, stating that he is loyal to the Man in Black. Sawyer later reveals his true plan to Kate: to turn both sides against each other and escape on the submarine while both sides are distracted.

== Production ==
This episode is the first to be written by Jim Galasso.

== Reception ==
"Recon" received mostly positive reviews from critics. Review aggregate website Metacritic gave the episode a score of 76 out of 100, indicating "Generally Favorable Reviews". The score was down on the previous week's score of 92. Jeff Jenson of Entertainment Weekly reviewed the episode positively, commenting that although it often seemed to function as a "set-up" episode, it "really worked for [him]" due to the return of Sawyer and "clever, trickster storytelling where every line seemed to have double meaning and so many scenes seemed pregnant with possibilities for what's really going on." Raju Mudhar of the Toronto Star agreed that the episode felt like "mid-game strategic stage setting", but gave a more negative review than Jensen, deeming Sawyer's off island life "pretty cliché and boring" and writing: "The really terrible thing about it is that it started off so promising." Sam McPherson of TV Overmind wrote that the episode defied his expectations, but was still less than stellar, preferring the main island storyline to the "disjointed" off-island plot. McPherson praised the return of Charlotte, opining that Mader gave a "fantastic" performance, and rated the episode "B+" overall. He felt that while "Recon" had weaknesses in the off-island plot, it was still Lost's best ever Sawyer-centric episode.
