= Dr. Linus =

- Lost episode
- Episode no.: Season 6 Episode 7
- Directed by: Mario Van Peebles
- Written by: Edward Kitsis; Adam Horowitz
- Production code: 607
- Original air date: March 9, 2010
- Running time: 43 minutes

Guest appearances
- Alan Dale as Charles Widmore; Daniel Roebuck as Dr. Leslie Arzt; William Atherton as Principal Don Reynolds; Tania Raymonde as Alex; Jon Gries as Roger Linus; Steve Boatright as Mike

Episode chronology
← Previous "Sundown"	Next → "Recon"
- Lost season 6

"Dr. Linus" is the seventh episode of the sixth season of ABC's drama television series Lost. It is the 110th episode overall. The episode was written by executive producers Edward Kitsis and Adam Horowitz and directed by actor Mario Van Peebles. The episode is centered on Benjamin Linus.

In 2007, Benjamin Linus (Michael Emerson) is forced by Ilana Verdansky (Zuleikha Robinson) to dig his own grave as a consequence of an uncovered lie. Meanwhile, Jack Shephard (Matthew Fox) attempts to convince Richard Alpert (Nestor Carbonell) that they have a purpose. In the "flash-sideways", Ben copes with internal matters in his workplace.

== Plot ==
=== 2004 (flash-sideways timeline) ===
Dr. Benjamin Linus (Michael Emerson) is a history teacher at a high school. One day in the teachers' lounge, he has a particularly loud conversation with fellow teacher, Leslie Arzt (Daniel Roebuck), in which they complain about the lack of funding at the school, especially since Principal Reynolds (William Atherton) has made Ben watch over the kids in detention, instead of chaperoning the school's history club. John Locke (Terry O'Quinn), a substitute teacher, suggests that Ben become principal instead. While tutoring his star pupil, Alex Rousseau (Tania Raymonde), Ben learns that the principal is having an affair with the school nurse. Ben enlists Arzt's help in hacking the nurse's email account and tries to blackmail the principal with this information and take his job. However, Reynolds says that he will write a negative letter of recommendation for Alex's college application if Ben makes good on his threats. Ben, unwilling to sacrifice Alex's future, backs down. He does, though, use his new leverage with the principal to get out of covering detention and restart the history club. Ben is also seen at home caring for his sick father (Jon Gries), who says he wishes he and Ben had never left the Island and the Dharma Initiative.

=== 2007 (original timeline) ===
Following the events of the previous episode, "Sundown", Ben, Ilana (Zuleikha Robinson), Miles Straume (Ken Leung), Sun Kwon (Yunjin Kim) and Frank Lapidus (Jeff Fahey) flee from the temple, after the devastating attack by the Man in Black (also O'Quinn). Ilana discovers that Ben killed Jacob, after Miles examines Jacob's ashes using his ability to read the last thoughts of human remains. After the group travels back to the original survivors' beach camp, Ilana ties Ben up and forces him to dig his own grave, so that she can exact revenge as Jacob was a father figure to her. The Man in Black arrives and attempts to recruit Ben, stating that he wants Ben to take over the Island once the Man in Black leaves with his followers. He frees Ben and tells him of a rifle standing against a tree about 200 yards in the jungle. As Ilana is trying to recapture him, Ben finds the rifle and gets the drop on her. But Ben only wishes to explain why he killed Jacob; he was afraid of losing his leadership position on the Island and felt rejected by Jacob, was angry because he chose the island over his daughter's life and was unable to forgive himself for letting her die. Ilana allows Ben to rejoin their group.

Following the events of the episode, "Lighthouse", Jack Shephard (Matthew Fox) and Hugo "Hurley" Reyes (Jorge Garcia) agree to return to the temple. Hurley attempts to stall Jack, as Jacob had warned him of the attack at the temple. But they come across Richard Alpert (Nestor Carbonell), who leads them to the grounded 18th century slave ship, Black Rock. Richard has become suicidal since Jacob's death because he believes that his life on the Island has been meaningless. He attempts to kill himself using dynamite. Jack even helps, knowing the Island won't let either of them die. When the dynamite fuse goes out, Jack convinces him that they are on the Island for a reason; they do have a purpose. They travel back to the beach and reunite with Ilana's group. Meanwhile, Miles has dug up some of the diamonds from Nikki and Paulo's grave.

During the reunion, Charles Widmore (Alan Dale) is shown to arrive near the island in a submarine.

== Reception ==
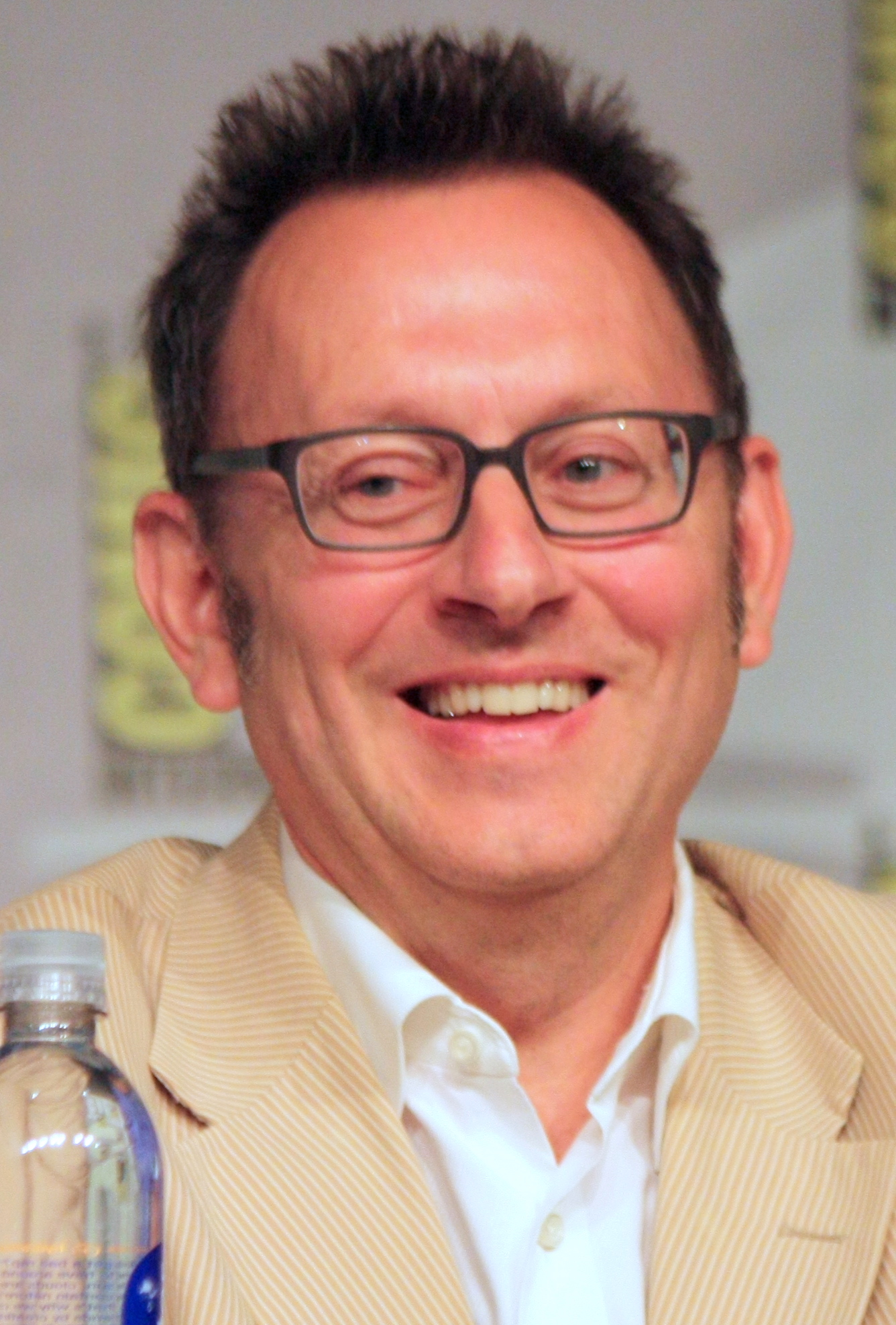
Critics favourably received the character development of Ben Linus (Michael Emerson, pictured).

The episode received critical acclaim. Review aggregate website Metacritic gave the episode a score of 92 out of 100, indicating "Universal Acclaim". The score was up on the previous week's score of 82, and is the best reviewed episode out of the first seven. Steven Kurutz of The Wall Street Journal deemed it the best episode of the season, containing "the perfect mix of action, drama and mysteries revealed." Kurutz felt that Ben's storyline in the alternate universe was "so much tighter" than the other characters' presented in previous episodes, and that it was "heartening" rather than "hokey" to see Ben join the other characters on the beach at the end. Alan Sepinwall of The Star-Ledger deemed "Dr. Linus" "easily the most compelling episode of this final season so far," enjoying even the scenes involving Jack, despite his "pathological hatred" of the character. Zap2it's Ryan McGee named the episode his second favorite of the season, kept only from superseding "The Substitute" by the overuse of Arzt. Maureen Ryan of the Chicago Tribune called it "a tautly constructed and thus very satisfying episode of TV", deeming Emerson's performance "awe-inspiring" and the storylines "heartbreaking". She agreed with Kurutz's assessment of the alternate universe storylines, writing that "Dr. Linus" did "the best job yet" of linking the themes from both timelines together. Emily VanDerWerff of the Los Angeles Times wrote that the episode was the best since "The Constant", and also approved of the alternate timeline, feeling that it "takes the basic components of Ben's fall from grace on the Island and uses them in a new fashion, reinventing not just the story of how he became who he was but also the story of who he is at his core."

Noel Murray of The A.V. Club described the episode as having a "strong finish" but "very shaky start". He found the resolution of Ben's blackmail plot implausible and the subtext excessive, commenting: "every scene and line in this episode seemed designed to make sure that we got the point about the cruelty of fate, the burden of power, and so on and so on." Murray enjoyed the episode's "poignant and tense" final minutes, however, and rated the episode "B−" overall, later rethinking his grade and changing it to a "B". BuddyTV's John Kubicek was similarly critical of the episode's subtext, and commented on his growing frustration with the alternate universe: "If the point is to show us how the Island made everyone a more interesting person, we get it, so please stop before we have to watch another watered-down character wuss out." Kubicek also criticized the episode's ending, describing the scene shot through the submarine's periscope as "one of the most ridiculous things Lost has ever done."
