= Paul Zbyszewski =

American television writer and producer

- Born: 1970 (age 55–56)
- Occupations: Writer, Producer
- Years active: 2001–present

Paul Zbyszewski is an American television writer and producer. He has worked in both capacities on the series Lost and Day Break, and he is the creator of Day Break. He also wrote the feature film After the Sunset.

== Career ==
Zbyszewski began working in television as a writer on the game show Weakest Link. His screenplay for After the Sunset (which he co-wrote with Craig Rosenberg) was released theatrically in 2004. Zbyszewski went on to create the ABC science fiction series Day Break, where he worked as a co-executive producer and writer for the show's short run in the 2006–2007 television season. He wrote the pilot as well as the episodes "What If They Run?", "What If She's Lying?" (with Henry Alonso Myers), "What If She's the Key?" (with Jeffrey Bell) and the series finale "What If It's Him?" (with Bell). In 2013–14, and 2014–15 Zbyszewski was executive producer or co-executive producer on all episodes of the new ABC hit drama, Agents of S.H.I.E.L.D.

Zbyszewski was a supervising producer and writer for the fifth season of Lost in 2009. He co-wrote the episodes "Jughead" (with executive producer Elizabeth Sarnoff), "Namaste" (with producer Brian K. Vaughn) and "Follow the Leader" (with Sarnoff). For their work on the fifth season of Lost, Zbyszewski and his co-workers were nominated for the Writers Guild of America Award for best drama series, an Emmy Award for outstanding drama series and the Producers Guild of America Award for outstanding episodic drama.

He was promoted to co-executive producer for the sixth, final season. He co-wrote three episodes with story editor Graham Roland; "Sundown", "The Package" and "The Last Recruit".

In May 2019, Zbyszewski was hired as showrunner and executive producer of a Helstrom series for Hulu, based on the Marvel Comics characters Daimon and Satana Hellstrom.
