= The Candidate (Lost) =

- Lost episode
- John Locke (Terry O'Quinn) leaves the hospital and rejects Jack Shephard's (Matthew Fox) offer in the flash-sideways timeline.
- Episode no.: Season 6 Episode 14
- Directed by: Jack Bender
- Written by: Elizabeth Sarnoff; Jim Galasso
- Production code: 614
- Original air date: May 4, 2010
- Running time: 43 minutes

Guest appearances
- Alan Dale as Charles Widmore; Sam Anderson as Bernard Nadler; Fred Koehler as Seamus; Maile Holck as Nurse; Casey Adams as Wheeler; Kevin Tighe as Anthony Cooper; Katey Sagal as Helen Norwood; Ken Elliott as Orderly; Christopher McGahan as Paul; Alan Seabock as Sub captain

Episode chronology
← Previous "The Last Recruit"	Next → "Across the Sea"
- Lost season 6

"The Candidate" is the 14th episode of the American Broadcasting Company's sixth season of the serial drama television series Lost and 117th episode overall. The episode aired on May 4, 2010, on ABC in the United States. The episode was written by Elizabeth Sarnoff and Jim Galasso and directed by Jack Bender. The episode is centered on Jack Shephard and John Locke.

In the flash-sideways timeline, Jack Shephard (Matthew Fox) tries to find out how John Locke (Terry O'Quinn) was paralyzed. In 2007, Jack and his group betray the Man in Black (also O'Quinn), but not without falling into his plans.

== Plot ==
=== 2004 (flash-sideways timeline) ===
After being successfully operated on by Jack Shephard (Matthew Fox), John Locke (Terry O'Quinn) awakens at the hospital. Jack says that Locke may be a candidate for a new surgical treatment to repair his pre-existing paralysis and asks how he wound up in his paraplegic state. However, Locke declines the offer. In order to find out more about Locke's paralysis, Jack visits dentist Dr. Bernard Nadler (Sam Anderson) and asks for the dental records from an emergency oral surgery performed on Locke about three years previously. Bernard refuses to breach confidentiality, but says that someone named Anthony Cooper (Kevin Tighe) was brought in along with Locke that day. At a nursing home, Jack visits Cooper, who is Locke's father in a vegetative state.

Claire Littleton (Emilie de Ravin) arrives at the hospital to see Jack. She shows him a music box that their father especially wanted her to have. Jack then invites Claire to stay at his house, as they are not strangers, but rather family.

As Locke prepares to leave the hospital, Jack tells him that he went to see Cooper to find out why he does not want the surgery. Locke reveals that the accident that made him paralyzed was a plane crash; he had just qualified for his pilot's license and Cooper was his first passenger. Jack tells Locke Cooper is "gone" and that punishing himself will not bring him back. Still refusing Jack's offer, Locke leaves.

=== 2007 (original timeline) ===
Jack awakens on Hydra Island with Sayid Jarrah (Naveen Andrews) by his side. (Note: This takes place after the events of "The Last Recruit".) The Man in Black arrives and says that James "Sawyer" Ford (Josh Holloway), Claire, Kate Austen (Evangeline Lilly), Frank Lapidus (Jeff Fahey), Hugo Reyes (Jorge Garcia), Sun Kwon (Yunjin Kim) and Jin Kwon (Daniel Dae Kim) have been taken prisoner by Charles Widmore (Alan Dale). The Man in Black plans to help them escape, run for the Ajira plane and leave the island before Widmore knows what is happening. Jack agrees to help, but insists that he himself will not leave the island.

At the Hydra Station, Widmore has Sawyer's group thrown inside the animal cages. Sayid turns off the camp's generator, bringing down the sonar fences which had been keeping the Man in Black at bay. The Man in Black attacks as the Smoke monster, allowing Jack to free Sawyer's group. Reuniting with Sayid, they start heading to the plane. The Man in Black reaches it before the group, and inspects its interior after killing Widmore's guards. He reveals to the group that Widmore rigged the plane with C4. Unable to take the risk of using the plane, the Man in Black decides to escape using Widmore's submarine. As they head to the docks, Sawyer asks Jack to stop the Man in Black from getting on board the sub.

At the docks, the survivors board the submarine while Widmore's men attack from the jungle. Kate is shot during the ensuing gun fight, but Jack gets her on board after pushing the Man in Black into the water. Getting out of the water, he begins to shoot down the last of Widmore's men. To prevent the Man in Black from entering, Sawyer has the sub take off without Claire.

On the sub, Jack discovers the Man in Black has planted the C4 in his bag and has set a timer to detonate. Unable to reach the surface in time, Sayid attempts to defuse the bomb. However, Jack tells Sawyer to let the timer reach zero, believing that nothing will happen to them because the Man in Black cannot kill them himself. Jack theorizes that the Man in Black united the candidates because he needed them all dead in order to leave the island, and is trying to trick them into killing one another by mistrusting each other. Unconvinced, Sawyer pulls the bomb's wires, causing the speed of its countdown to accelerate. Sayid tells Jack where to find Desmond Hume and runs to the back of the sub with the bomb.

The bomb detonates, killing Sayid and causing an explosion that floods the sub. Frank is knocked out by a door as it gives way to the water. Sun is pinned down by fragments of the submarine. Hurley exits the sub with a wounded Kate, while Jin, Sawyer, and Jack try to help Sun. After Sawyer is knocked unconscious, Jin convinces Jack to leave with Sawyer. Jin continues to try to free Sun despite her pleas for him to go. He tells Sun that he will not leave her. They then embrace as water floods the submarine, and they both drown.

Jack, Sawyer, Kate, and Hurley regroup at a nearby beach, and mourn the deaths of Sayid, Sun and Jin. At the docks, the Man in Black leaves Claire to "finish what [he] started."

== Production ==
The episode features the deaths of 3 main cast members, the highest of any episode in the series. Showrunners Damon Lindelof and Carlton Cuse described the episode as "brutal". Regarding the mass deaths of the characters, Lindelof stated "now you know this show is willing and capable of killing anyone." Cuse also added "There is no ambiguity. [The Man In Black] is evil and he has to be stopped... When we watched the death scenes ourselves, it was brutal. [But] the story always comes first."

== Reception ==
The episode received critical acclaim. Review aggregate website Metacritic gave the episode a score of 92 out of 100, indicating "Universal Acclaim". The score was up on the previous episode's score of 73. Maureen Ryan of Chicago Tribune gave a perfect score, stating "Not only were the island events compelling, they neatly tied into the Sideways themes of trust and penance." James Poniewozik of Time also rated the episode perfect, calling it "heartbreaking, and horrifying, and breathtaking, and in some ways maddening." IGN's Chris Carbot praised the episode as well, saying "the story continues to deliver thrilling moments." However, he criticized the pacing of the flash-sideways storyline, describing it as "moving at a snails pace when compared to events occurring on the island." Overall, he gave the episode a score of 9.2. Emily VanDerWerff of Los Angeles Times deemed the episode as "one of the greatest episodes of the show ever for pure adrenaline rush, right up there with Through the Looking Glass and Exodus, Parts 1 and 2."

Many critics expressed shock regarding the deaths of the characters. Alan Sepinwall of Star Ledger thought the episode "drastically accelerated the pace of the unhappy endings." Chris Carbot stated "Sayid's death was a fitting end to his story. He had been on course to redeem himself ever since switching over to Team Smokie and was thankfully given the opportunity to go out in grand fashion ... Jin and Sun's demise came as a total shock. In fact, I'm still having a hard time processing the fact that they're actually dead, at least in the regular timeline." Sam McPherson of TV Overmind deemed the episode as "having great and terrible deaths."
