= Sundown (Lost) =

- Lost episode
- Kate (Evangeline Lilly), Claire (Emilie de Ravin) and Sayid (Naveen Andrews) walking away from the Temple massacre.
- Episode no.: Season 6 Episode 6
- Directed by: Bobby Roth
- Written by: Paul Zbyszewski; Graham Roland
- Production code: 606
- Original air date: March 2, 2010
- Running time: 41 minutes

Guest appearances
- Hiroyuki Sanada as Dogen; Kevin Durand as Martin Keamy; Kimberley Joseph as Cindy Chandler; John Hawkes as Lennon; Anthony Azizi as Omar; Andrea Gabriel as Nadia Jazeem; Cas Anvar as Omer Jarrah; Kiersten Havelock as Emma; Mickey Graue as Zack; Kailee Velasco as Eva Jarrah; Peter Stray as Doctor; David Griffith as Other; Aramis Knight as Sam Jarrah; Salvatore Abbadessa as Taxi driver

Episode chronology
← Previous "Lighthouse"	Next → "Dr. Linus"
- Lost season 6

"Sundown" is the sixth episode of the sixth season of the ABC serial drama television series Lost and 109th episode overall. The episode aired on March 2, 2010 in the United States. The episode was written by co-executive producer Paul Zbyszewski and story editor Graham Roland (making his writing debut for the series) and directed by Bobby Roth. The episode is centered on the character of Sayid Jarrah.

In 2007, Claire Littleton (Emilie de Ravin) delivers a message from the Man in Black (Terry O'Quinn). Because of this, Sayid Jarrah (Naveen Andrews) is tasked by Dogen (Hiroyuki Sanada) to kill the Man in Black, who gives Sayid a difficult decision. In the "flash-sideways", Sayid is drawn into a family crisis.

== Plot ==
=== 2004 (flash-sideways timeline) ===
Following the events of the season premiere, "LA X", Sayid Jarrah (Naveen Andrews) arrives at the home of his brother, Omer (Cas Anvar), and Omer's wife, Nadia (Andrea Gabriel). Late one night, Omer tells Sayid that he recently borrowed a substantial amount of money from a loan shark but had paid it back. Nevertheless, the loan shark has told Omer that he will owe interest forever. Omer asks Sayid to help with his problem. Sayid refuses because he no longer wishes to be a violent person. The next day, Omer is severely beaten and Nadia begs Sayid not to get involved. Nadia and Sayid discuss their feelings for each other, leading Sayid to tell Nadia that he doesn't deserve her. Later on, Sayid is taken to see the loan shark, Martin Keamy (Kevin Durand); after a short conversation, Sayid kills him and his men, including Keamy's henchman Omar (Anthony Azizi). While leaving the scene, he stumbles across Jin-Soo Kwon (Daniel Dae Kim), who is tied up in a freezer.

=== 2007 (original timeline) ===
Following the events of the previous episode, "Lighthouse", Sayid confronts Dogen (Hiroyuki Sanada) about the poison pill. Dogen claims that Sayid is evil. They get into a struggle, but Dogen refuses to kill him, instead banishing Sayid from the temple. At the same time, the Man in Black (Terry O'Quinn) sends Claire Littleton (Emilie de Ravin) into the temple to ask Dogen to come out. He refuses to leave the temple and imprisons Claire. He then gives Sayid a dagger and instructs him to kill the Man in Black, in order to prove that he is still a good person. Sayid does as instructed, but the dagger has no effect. The Man in Black explains that Dogen never expected Sayid to succeed, only to get himself killed in the attempt. He then says that if Sayid cooperates, he can have anything he wants, including a dead loved one. Sayid is sent back to the temple with a message for the Others.

Sayid delivers the Man in Black's ultimatum to the Others: any who do not leave the Temple before sundown will be killed. This causes a panic among the Others, most of whom, including Cindy (Kimberley Joseph), decide to leave. Amidst the chaos, Kate Austen (Evangeline Lilly) returns to the temple in her search for Claire. She confronts Lennon (John Hawkes), who takes Kate to Claire. Kate explains that she has been raising Claire's son, Aaron, for the past three years but is unable to continue speaking with her. Meanwhile, Sayid confronts Dogen, who reveals how he came to the island: several years ago, he was a businessman in Japan who became drunk one night and caused a car accident that killed his 12-year-old son. Jacob (Mark Pellegrino) visited them in the hospital and offered to heal Dogen's son in exchange for Dogen coming to the island and never returning. After Dogen finishes his story, Sayid tackles him into the spring and drowns him. Afterward, he kills Lennon by slitting his throat. Dogen's death allows the Man in Black to enter the temple and attack the Others as the Smoke Monster.

Ilana (Zuleikha Robinson), Sun-Hwa Kwon (Yunjin Kim), Frank Lapidus (Jeff Fahey) and Ben Linus (Michael Emerson) arrive at the temple shortly after the attack begins, searching for the other candidates. While there, Sun finds out that Jin is alive. Ben goes looking for Sayid, but flees when he sees that Sayid has killed Dogen and Lennon. Kate is separated from the group and goes after Claire. Ilana, Sun, Frank and Miles Straume (Ken Leung) flee through a secret passage. After the attack, which leaves almost everyone dead, Sayid, Claire and Kate join the Others with the Man in Black outside the temple.

== Production ==
This episode is the first to be co-written by Graham Roland.

== Reception ==
The episode received positive reviews. Metacritic awarded a score of 82 out of 100. This was up on the previous week's episode, which scored a 71 out of 100. Cynthia Littleton of Variety described it as "one of the creepiest and craziest episodes of 'Lost' ever."
