= Lighthouse (Lost) =

- Lost episode
- Hurley (Jorge Garcia) sees Jacob's (Mark Pellegrino) ghost.
- Episode no.: Season 6 Episode 5
- Directed by: Jack Bender
- Written by: Damon Lindelof; Carlton Cuse
- Production code: 605
- Original air date: February 23, 2010
- Running time: 43 minutes

Guest appearances
- Mark Pellegrino as Jacob; Hiroyuki Sanada as Dogen; Dayo Ade as Justin; Veronica Hamel as Margo Shephard; Dylan Minnette as David Shephard; Sean Kinerney as Dogen's son

Episode chronology
← Previous "The Substitute"	Next → "Sundown"
- Lost season 6

"Lighthouse" is the fifth television episode of the American Broadcasting Company's sixth season of the serial drama television series Lost and 108th episode overall. The episode aired on February 23, 2010, on ABC in the United States and 2 hours earlier on A in Canada due to the 2010 Winter Olympics. The episode was written by showrunners and executive producers Damon Lindelof and Carlton Cuse and was directed by Jack Bender. The episode is centered on Jack Shephard.

In 2007, the ghost of Jacob (Mark Pellegrino) instructs Hugo "Hurley" Reyes (Jorge Garcia) to bring Jack Shephard (Matthew Fox) to an unspecified place. Meanwhile, Jin-Soo Kwon (Daniel Dae Kim) finds Claire Littleton (Emilie de Ravin) after 3 years of disappearance, but begins to question her sanity. In the "flash-sideways", Jack deals with the issues of parenthood.

== Plot ==
=== 2004 (flash-sideways timeline) ===
Jack Shephard arrives late to pick up his son, David (Dylan Minnette), from school. (Note: This takes place after the events of the season premiere, "LA X".) David is distant from his father. Jack visits his mother (Veronica Hamel) to help find Jack's father's will, leaving David alone. Jack's mother reveals that David was upset at his grandfather's funeral. However, he never showed it to Jack. She suggests that perhaps David is "terrified" of Jack, just as Jack was afraid of his father as a child. They find the will, but are confused to see Claire Littleton (Emilie de Ravin) included in it, whom they never heard about.

Jack returns home to find that David has snuck out. Jack goes to David's mother's house; she is absent but Jack learns that David is at an important piano recital. Jack goes to the conservatory where David is performing an interpretation of Chopin's Fantaisie-Impromptu on the piano. Jack runs into Dogen (Hiroyuki Sanada), another parent at the event, who praises David's skill and believes he has a gift. Afterward, David admits that he did not tell Jack about the recital for fear of disappointing him. Jack explains his complicated relationship with his father and reassures his son that he can never be a disappointment to him; David appears to warm up to his father now.

=== 2007 (original timeline) ===
At the Others' temple, Hugo "Hurley" Reyes (Jorge Garcia) is approached by the ghost of the deceased Jacob (Mark Pellegrino), who tasks Hurley on a mission to lead Jack to somewhere to aid the arrival of someone en route to the island. (Note: This takes place after the events of the episode "What Kate Does".) Hurley is a candidate and so, not even Dogen can stop him from completing his mission. Hurley uses the phrase "you have what it takes" to recruit Jack. Along the way, Jack and Hurley encounter Kate Austen (Evangeline Lilly), who refuses to go with them to continue her search for Claire. Jack and Hurley pass through the caves, encountering the "Adam & Eve" skeletons and Jack's father's coffin.

Jack and Hurley arrive at a lighthouse, at the top of which is a dial and lined-up mirrors. Each notch on the dial has a name listed next to it, corresponding to the surnames and numbers seen in "The Substitute". Hurley begins to move the dial to 108 degrees as instructed by Jacob, but Jack turns the dial to the 23 mark, where his own surname is listed, revealing Jack's childhood home in the reflection; Jack realizes that Jacob has been watching all of them for a long time, and becomes upset. He interrogates Hurley, who cannot answer any of his questions, leading Jack to destroy the mirrors. Outside, Jacob reappears to Hurley, congratulating him on bringing Jack to the lighthouse. Jacob did not want them to send a signal, but instead needed Jack to see the mirror and realize that he is important to the Island. Jacob also needed to get Jack and Hurley away from the temple because "someone bad" was coming there.

Meanwhile, Jin-Soo Kwon (Daniel Dae Kim) is rescued by Claire from her trap, taking him and injured Other Justin to her hideout. Claire has been living on the island in the three years since Jin and everyone else's departure. She treats Jin's leg injury and then threatens to kill Justin unless he reveals the location of her son Aaron. As the Others never kidnapped Aaron, Justin has no idea where the child is. Claire believes that the Others have her baby because both her father and "her friend" told her so. Jin informs her that Kate has been raising Aaron off the island. (Note: As seen in Eggtown.) Claire murders Justin, regardless, claiming he would do the same to her given the chance. Jin then claims that he was lying about Aaron earlier, leading Claire to say she would have killed Kate if it were true. Later, Claire's "friend", the Man in Black impersonating John Locke (Terry O'Quinn), shows up as Jin and Claire discuss how to return to the temple. Claire knows it is not Locke.

== Reception ==
The episode received positive reviews. Metacritic awarded a score of 71 out of 100. This was down on the previous week's episode, which scored an 88 out of 100. Chris Carbot of IGN gave the episode a positive review, saying "Lighthouse isn't filled with the wall-to-wall excitement of last week's Locke-centric story but it still has plenty of great moments and surprising revelations." Overall, he gave the episode a score of 8.8. Noel Murray of The A.V. Club praised the episode, and gave the episode a grade of A−. Jeff Jensen of Entertainment Weekly gave the episode a positive review as well, stating "tonight's episode, “Lighthouse,” was not as awesome as last week's episode, “The Substitute,” nor was it as mind-melting as the season premiere, “LA X.” But it was certainly better than “What Kate Does" ... [and] the more I sit with this episode, the more I'm digging it." James Poniewozik of Time gave the episode a positive review as well, stating the episode "moved the endgame forward." Variety's Cynthia Littleton praised "Lighthouse" for having "a heavy old-school "Lost" vibe" and the flash-forwards starting to make more sense.

However, some critics gave the episode mixed reviews. Maureen Ryan of Chicago Tribune thought, "If I have any recurring complaint this season, it's this: A great episode of 'Lost' works as an hour of TV. It may leave you with questions but it doesn't leave you thinking you have to wait three or four or six more weeks to figure out certain basic facts about what's going on". Also, Eric Deggans of St. Petersburg Times gave the episode a negative review, criticizing Jack's storylines while praising Claire's, "this is the new rhythm for Lost's final season; one groundbreaking episode filled with revelations and amazing characterizations, followed by an episode so static it feels as if the show is running in place … interesting moments came when it turned to the story of Claire in the post-crash timeline." IGN ranked the episode 41st out of the 115 Lost episodes, noting that "the answers still weren't coming this early in Season 6, much to the confusion of fans everywhere", while the Los Angeles Times ranked "Lighthouse" as the 91st, saying it was "a hotly divisive episode" but "improves the more the show fills in the gaps around it and the more the show makes Jack the center of its final season."
