= Lost season 6 =

Season of television series

Lost
- Season 6
- DVD cover
- Showrunners: Damon Lindelof; Carlton Cuse
- Starring: Naveen Andrews; Nestor Carbonell; Henry Ian Cusick; Emilie de Ravin; Michael Emerson; Jeff Fahey; Matthew Fox; Jorge Garcia; Josh Holloway; Daniel Dae Kim; Yunjin Kim; Ken Leung; Evangeline Lilly; Terry O'Quinn; Zuleikha Robinson; Sam Anderson; L. Scott Caldwell; Francois Chau; Jeremy Davies; Fionnula Flanagan; Maggie Grace; Rebecca Mader; Elizabeth Mitchell; Dominic Monaghan; Ian Somerhalder; John Terry; Sonya Walger; Cynthia Watros
- No. of episodes: 18

Release
- Original network: ABC
- Original release: February 2 – May 23, 2010

Season chronology
- ← Previous; Season 5

The sixth and final season of the American serial drama television series Lost commenced airing in the United States and Canada on February 2, 2010. The sixth-season premiere was the first to climb in the ratings year-over-year since the second season, drawing 12.1 million viewers. The season aired Tuesdays at 9:00 pm from February 2 to May 18. The series finale aired on Sunday, May 23, 2010. The finale ran two and a half hours starting at 9:00 pm—followed by the previously announced post-finale special, Jimmy Kimmel Live: Aloha to Lost, at 12:05 am.

The season continues the story of the survivors of the fictional September 22, 2004 crash of Oceanic Airlines Flight 815 on an island in the South Pacific. The survivors must deal with two outcomes of the detonation of a hydrogen bomb on the island in 1977. While the on-island story continues, the "flash sideways" shows a second timeline where Flight 815 never crashes. The season was released on DVD and Blu-ray on August 24, 2010, alongside a complete series box set. Included in the special features was "The New Man in Charge", a previously unaired shortened episode that serves as an epilogue following the events of the finale.

== Production ==
On May 7, 2007, ABC Entertainment President Stephen McPherson announced that Lost would end during the 2009–2010 season with a "highly anticipated and shocking finale." "We felt that this was the only way to give Lost a proper creative conclusion," McPherson said. Beginning with the 2007–2008 television season, the final 48 episodes would have been aired as three seasons with 16 episodes each, with Lost concluding in its sixth season. Due to 2007–2008 Writers Guild of America strike, the fourth season featured 14 episodes, and season 5 had 17 episodes. Season six was planned to have 17 episodes, too. However, on June 29, 2009 it was announced that the final season would feature an additional hour, making the number of episodes 18.

Executive producers Damon Lindelof and Carlton Cuse stated that they "always envisioned Lost as a show with a beginning, middle, and end," and that by announcing when the show would end that viewers would "have the security of knowing that the story will play out as we've intended." Lindelof and Cuse stated that securing the 2010 series-end date "was immensely liberating" and helped the series rediscover its focus. Lindelof noted, "We're no longer stalling." The producers planned to wrap up mysteries, such as the reason the Dharma periodic resupply drops continue after the purge, Walt's unusual abilities, and the "bird" from "Exodus" and "Live Together, Die Alone". Although these mysteries, among others, were left unresolved in the season, all three were answered or touched upon in the series epilogue, "The New Man in Charge." Matthew Fox said in an interview that in the final season, the characters of Jack Shephard and John Locke "will come head to head." It was also claimed that a third of the way through the final season, the two timelines would be "solidified into one" and "will be very linear – no more flashbacks, nothing;" however this did not become the case. He also claimed to be the only cast member to know the ending of the series, though Lindelof has clarified that Fox only knew things that were relevant to his character.

During the 2009 San Diego Comic-Con, numerous sixth-season reports were made. Carlton Cuse stated both the time travel and flash-forward seasons were over, and they were moving into something different for the sixth season. Josh Holloway stated his character Sawyer would revert to his old self after the loss of Juliet. Cuse and Lindelof stated that the Dharma Initiative would no longer play a large role in the show, but the "Dharma-Michigan connection" would play a significant role in season six. However, this did not happen. Lindelof stated that the producers had a direct hand in the production of the season six promotional poster that was first displayed at Comic-Con, and that everything in it was intentional; he also made a reference to the Abbey Road cover in connection to the poster. Season six was the first and only season of Lost ever to not feature any kind of preview or official promotional material such as sneak peeks and promo pictures for future episodes since the Lost producers considered any single frame from the first episodes to be too revealing. According to Lindelof, "even a single scene from the show would basically tip what it is we're doing this year, and what it is we're doing this year is different than what we've done in other years." Lindelof has also emphasized that the flashes-sideways are important, stating "People are saying [they] don't need these stories and all we can say is they're absolutely 100 percent necessary to tell the story of Lost, and hopefully by the end of the season it will be more obvious as to why." He also noted that the term "flash-sideways" was deliberately used instead of "alternate reality" because viewers might otherwise "infer that one of them isn't real, or one of them is real and the other is the alternate to being real." When asked to describe the last three episodes, Lindelof said "Water."

ABC charged advertisers $900,000 USD for a 30-second commercial during the series finale, in contrast to the standard 2010 season price of $214,000.

== Cast ==
From left to right: Ilana, Richard, Claire, Sayid, Kate, Sawyer, Locke, Jack, Jin, Ben, Hurley, Sun, Miles and Frank, arranged in a pastiche of Leonardo da Vinci's The Last Supper. Sayid occupies the same position as Judas.

The cast features 15 major roles with star billing: 11 return from the fifth season, one returns from the fourth season after a year's absence, and three are new regular cast members. Unlike the latter half of the previous season, in which the cast was divided into two groups following two separate storylines, Season Six features an alternate universe scenario which the producers call "flash-sideways," and almost all the main characters participate in both storylines. Returning from the fifth season are the survivors' leader Dr. Jack Shephard (Matthew Fox); former fugitive Kate Austen (Evangeline Lilly); millionaire Hugo "Hurley" Reyes (Jorge Garcia); former torturer Sayid Jarrah (Naveen Andrews); con artist James "Sawyer" Ford (Josh Holloway); medium Miles Straume (Ken Leung); former mob-enforcer Jin-Soo Kwon (Daniel Dae Kim) and his privileged wife Sun Kwon (Yunjin Kim); leader of the island's native population, known as the "Others," Ben Linus (Michael Emerson); deceased crash survivor John Locke, who lives on in the sideways timeline but has been impersonated in the original timeline by the mysterious Man In Black (Terry O'Quinn); and former islander Desmond Hume (Henry Ian Cusick), who starts the season off the island. Emilie de Ravin reprises her role as Claire Littleton, a new mother who was absent for one season after disappearing on the Island. The new main cast roles are pilot Frank Lapidus (Jeff Fahey), Richard Alpert (Nestor Carbonell), an ageless advisor to the Others, and mysterious Flight 316 leader Ilana Verdansky (Zuleikha Robinson). Carbonell was named a main cast member by the executive producers at Comic-Con 2009, after guest starring in the previous three seasons, and Fahey and Robinson were confirmed after appearing in recurring roles in the fourth and fifth seasons.

Several former cast members also returned to the show for the final season. Elizabeth Mitchell returns as fertility specialist Dr. Juliet Burke, Dominic Monaghan returns as deceased rock star Charlie Pace, and Jeremy Davies returns as deceased physicist Daniel Faraday. Ian Somerhalder reprises his role as deceased Flight 815 crash survivor Boone Carlyle, as does Rebecca Mader as anthropologist Charlotte Lewis. Harold Perrineau and Cynthia Watros, who portray Michael Dawson and Libby Smith, respectively, return in the second half of the season. About the return of Libby, Cuse stated, "Finally, all of your questions [about Libby] will be answered", however, Lindelof jokingly responded, "No, they will not". Michelle Rodriguez, another second season star, returns as police officer Ana Lucia Cortez, following a brief cameo in the fifth season. Maggie Grace, who portrays Shannon Rutherford, Boone's stepsister, was asked to return at the beginning of the season, but Grace was unable due to her schedule; though she eventually did make an appearance in one episode. Adewale Akinnuoye-Agbaje, who played the deceased Mr. Eko, was in negotiations to return, but these negotiations failed because of difficulties with fees. Furthermore, the producers wished to bring back the character of Walt Lloyd, however Malcolm David Kelley, who portrays Walt, had aged significantly and the producers were unable to overcome this obstacle. Kelley eventually appeared in the epilogue of the series, "The New Man in Charge."

Numerous recurring characters who reprised their roles for the final season include: Jack and Claire's father, Dr. Christian Shephard (John Terry), wealthy industrialist and former Other Charles Widmore (Alan Dale), Desmond's wife Penny Widmore (Sonya Walger), former Other Eloise Hawking (Fionnula Flanagan), Locke's ex-girlfriend, Helen Norwood (Katey Sagal), Hurley's former boss, Randy Nations (Billy Ray Gallion), mysterious Flight 316 passenger Bram (Brad William Henke), Sayid's wife, Nadia (Andrea Gabriel), deceased Frenchwoman Danielle Rousseau (Mira Furlan), science teacher Leslie Arzt (Daniel Roebuck), deceased one-eyed Other Mikhail Bakunin (Andrew Divoff), the Others' doctor Ethan Rom (William Mapother), Ben Linus' father Roger (Jon Gries), mercenaries Martin Keamy (Kevin Durand) and Omar (Anthony Azizi), and Vincent, a dog who survived the crash of Flight 815 and lives on the island. Furthermore, Greg Grunberg briefly reprises his role as Flight 815 pilot Seth Norris in a voice over in the season premiere. Mark Pellegrino reprises his role as Jacob, the mysterious figure in charge of the island, while Titus Welliver also reprises his role as the mysterious unnamed character, known only as "The Man in Black", who appeared to be antagonistic to him in the season 5 finale. L. Scott Caldwell and Sam Anderson reprised their roles as Rose Henderson and Bernard respectively, as does Kimberley Joseph who plays 815 stewardess-turned-Other Cindy. Also, Academy Award-winner Fisher Stevens returns as communications officer George Minkowski from the first few episodes of the fourth season in the eleventh episode. Kevin Tighe returns as Anthony Cooper, Locke's father. Also, minor characters such as Lynn Karnoff (Suzanne Krull) and Dr. Douglas Brooks (Bruce Davison) return.

Several new recurring characters were introduced in the sixth season. Deadwood actor John Hawkes was cast to portray a character named Lennon and Japanese actor Hiroyuki Sanada obtained the role of Dogen (道厳, dōgen); both men are Others stationed at the temple. Also, William Atherton was cast in a guest role as the principal of the school where Ben works. Sheila Kelley was cast in a recurring role that was initially described as "Kendall" and later confirmed to be "Zoe". Kelley appeared in five episodes, starting with "Recon".

== Reception ==
On Rotten Tomatoes, the season has an approval rating of 68% with an average score of 8.7 out of 10 based on 34 reviews. The website's critical consensus reads, "Lost's shift in central mythology won't satisfy all viewers, but persistent fans will find solace in the show's strong performances and continued dedication to its themes."

The season premiere was watched by 12 million American viewers and the series finale was watched by 13.5 million American viewers. The entire season averaged 10 million viewers.

The sixth and final season was nominated for twelve Emmy Awards at the 62nd Primetime Emmy Awards, including Outstanding Drama Series, Outstanding Writing for a Drama Series for Carlton Cuse and Damon Lindelof for the series finale, "The End", Outstanding Directing for a Drama Series for Jack Bender for "The End", Outstanding Lead Actor in a Drama Series for Matthew Fox, Outstanding Supporting Actor in a Drama Series for Michael Emerson and Terry O'Quinn, Outstanding Guest Actress in a Drama Series for Elizabeth Mitchell, Outstanding Art Direction for a Single Camera Series for "Ab Aeterno", Outstanding Music Composition for a Series (Original Dramatic Score) for Michael Giacchino for "The End", Outstanding Sound Editing for a Series for "The End", and Outstanding Sound Mixing for a Comedy or Drama Series (One Hour) for "The End". It won only one Emmy, for Outstanding Single Camera Picture Editing for a Drama Series for "The End".

== Episodes ==
The season premiered on February 2, 2010, with a double-length episode (two hours including commercials) preceded by a one-hour clip show, titled "Lost: Final Chapter". The show continued from February 9 in its new timeslot of Tuesdays at 9:00 pm, with a total of 18 episodes airing in 16 broadcasts, ending with a two-and-a-half-hour series finale, which aired Sunday, May 23, 2010, preceded by a one-hour clip show, titled "Lost: The Final Journey". Additionally, the first hour of the premiere episode was screened to an estimated 15,000 fans on Waikiki Beach on January 30.

No. overall	No. in season	Title	Directed by	Written by	Featured character(s)	Original release date	U.S. viewers (millions)
104 105	1 2	"LA X"	Jack Bender	Damon Lindelof & Carlton Cuse	various	February 2, 2010	12.09
In 2004, Oceanic Flight 815 lands safely while the island's remnants are shown at the bottom of the ocean. Jack encounters Desmond on the plane and saves Charlie from choking on a bag of heroin. Upon landing at LAX, he learns that Oceanic lost Christian Shephard's body. He befriends Locke and offers him a free consultation for his paraplegia. Kate escapes from Edward Mars and hijacks a taxi with Claire inside. Following the Jughead's detonation, (Note: As depicted in "The Incident".) the survivors are transported back to 2007. Juliet dies in Sawyer's arms, while Jacob appears to Hurley and tells him to take a dying Sayid to the temple. A group of Others confront them, only for Hurley to show them the guitar case, (Note: Given to him by Jacob in "The Incident".) which has a note inside ordering them to save Sayid. The Others drown him in temple water, which revives him. The Man in Black reveals himself to be the smoke monster when he kills Ilana's men and tells Ben he wants to leave the island.
106	3	"What Kate Does"	Paul Edwards	Edward Kitsis & Adam Horowitz	Kate	February 9, 2010	11.05
Kate kicks Claire out of the taxi and gets her handcuffs removed, but offers Claire a ride to the couple that was supposed to adopt Aaron Littleton when she learns she is pregnant. They turn Claire down and she goes into labor, so Kate takes her to the hospital, where Ethan Goodspeed delivers Aaron. Claire covers for Kate when the police arrive. On the island, temple leader Dogen runs experiments on Sayid and asks Jack to poison him, saying that he has been infected and will soon have his personality changed completely. Sawyer leaves the temple, and Kate and Jin go to retrieve him. Kate gets in a fight with her Other cohort and runs off, finding Sawyer at his old house in the Barracks, blaming himself for Juliet. Jin is cornered by the Others and is saved by Claire.
107	4	"The Substitute"	Tucker Gates	Elizabeth Sarnoff & Melinda Hsu Taylor	Locke	February 16, 2010	9.82
Locke is fired for missing a conference with a successful Hurley. He refers Locke to his temp agency, where he and Rose Nadler bond over their handicaps and she gets him work as a substitute teacher. He admits to his fiancée, Helen Norwood, that he missed the conference to attempt a walkabout. On the island, the Man in Black encounters Sawyer and asks both him and Richard to help him leave. Richard refuses, warning Sawyer that the Man in Black wants to kill them all. The Man in Black takes Sawyer to a cave where names with corresponding numbers are written on the walls, with Locke, Hurley, Sawyer, Sayid, Jack, and one of the Kwons matching Hurley's numbers. The Man in Black claims that Jacob manipulated their lives to put them on Flight 815, and Sawyer accepts his offer to leave the island together.
108	5	"Lighthouse"	Jack Bender	Carlton Cuse & Damon Lindelof	Jack	February 23, 2010	9.95
As Jack learns that Claire is named in Christian's will, he struggles to maintain a relationship with his distant son David. He learns about his audition for a music school and hurries to see it, reconciling with him as Dogen, the parent of another student, praises David's ability. On the island, Jacob instructs Hurley to go with Jack to a lighthouse. At the top, they find a dial with "candidate" names etched into it, and when Jack turns it to his name, an image of his childhood home appears. Hurley realizes that Jacob asked him to take Jack so he could gain a sense of purpose. Claire, having been manipulated by the Man in Black into thinking the Others have Aaron, takes Jin and an Other to her hut. When Jin explains that Kate has Aaron, Claire kills the Other and threatens to do the same to Kate.
109	6	"Sundown"	Bobby Roth	Paul Zbyszewski & Graham Roland	Sayid	March 2, 2010	9.29
Visiting his brother, Sayid and his sister-in-law Nadia Jaseem discuss their feelings for each other, with him concluding he does not deserve her. Loan shark Martin Keamy brutalizes his brother, so Sayid meets with and kills him, finding Jin restrained in a nearby freezer. On the island, Dogen explains that his tests revealed Sayid's evil nature. Dogen orders Sayid to kill an arriving Man in Black to prove his goodness, which he fails to do. The Man in Black promises Sayid that Nadia will be returned from the dead if he joins him. Sayid warns the Others that if they do not join the Man in Black by sundown they will be killed. Sayid kills Dogen, allowing the Man in Black to enter and massacre the remaining Others. A surviving Kate joins him.
110	7	"Dr. Linus"	Mario Van Peebles	Edward Kitsis & Adam Horowitz	Ben	March 9, 2010	9.49
Ben is a history teacher and struggles to get funding for his school club when Locke suggests he take over as principal. He collects evidence of the principal's infidelity and tries to blackmail him, but backs down when he threatens the college career of Alex Rousseau, his favorite student. Ben bargains to secure funding for the club. On the island, Ilana has Miles use his ability on Jacob's ashes and learns that Ben killed him. Furious, she forces Ben to dig his own grave, but the Man in Black tempts him with leadership of the island and directs him on how to escape and kill her. He instead tells her that he killed Jacob because he was never chosen, and how he sacrificed Alex (Note: As depicted in "The Shape of Things to Come".) for him. Jack meets a disillusioned Richard and insists that the island needs them both to live, proving this when they try to kill themselves with dynamite and the fuse goes out. The survivors reunite on the beach and Ben is allowed to stay with them, while a submarine owned by Charles Widmore watches from the water.
111	8	"Recon"	Jack Bender	Elizabeth Sarnoff & Jim Galasso	Sawyer	March 16, 2010	8.87
Sawyer, an LAPD detective, goes on a blind date with Charlotte, which goes well until she finds his folder on Anthony Cooper. He admits to Miles, his partner, that he was in Sydney hunting a lead on Cooper. His car is hit by Kate, whom he chases down and detains. On the island, Claire tries to kill Kate until the Man in Black calms her. He sends Sawyer to Hydra Island to check on Ajira Flight 316, his way off the island, and Sawyer finds that the 316 survivors have been killed by Widmore's men. He is captured and brought to the sub, where Widmore asks him to lure the Man in Black into a trap. Sawyer tells the Man in Black about the plan, and tells Kate that he is working both sides so they can escape on the sub together.
112	9	"Ab Aeterno"	Tucker Gates	Melinda Hsu Taylor & Greggory Nations	Richard	March 23, 2010	9.31
In 1867, Richard accidentally kills a corrupt doctor while trying to get medicine for his dying wife Isabella. He is sold into slavery on the Black Rock, which crashes into the Tawaret statue. The Man in Black kills the slavers and uses visions of Isabella to convince Richard that he is in Hell. He tells him that Jacob is Satan and orders Richard to kill him, but Jacob disarms Richard and explains that the island keeps the Man in Black from destroying the world. Fearing Hell for killing the doctor, Richard asks Jacob to make him immortal in exchange for being his representative. In 2007, Richard renounces Jacob and decides to join the Man in Black, only for Hurley to speak for Isabella's ghost and beg him to save them, restoring his faith.
113	10	"The Package"	Paul Edwards	Paul Zbyszewski & Graham Roland	Sun & Jin	March 30, 2010	10.13
Jin, Sun's secret lover, loses Woo-Jung Paik's money at customs. Keamy kidnaps him, and Sun realizes that Woo-Jung has learned of their affair and the money was to pay Keamy to kill Jin. Sayid frees Jin and kills Keamy's man Mikhail Bakunin, but Sun is shot and tells him she is pregnant. On the island, the Man in Black tries to convince her to come with him, but she flees and hits her head, causing her to forget English. Richard decides to destroy Flight 316 to prevent the Man in Black from leaving. Widmore's men kidnap Jin and take him to Hydra Island, where Widmore convinces him to stop the Man in Black. The Man in Black sends Sayid to investigate the sub, whereupon he sees Desmond being led out of it.
114	11	"Happily Ever After"	Jack Bender	Carlton Cuse & Damon Lindelof	Desmond	April 6, 2010	9.55
To test if Desmond can again survive, (Note: In reference to the Swan station's electromagnetic incident, as depicted in "Live Together, Die Alone".) Widmore subjects him to lethal electromagnetism that sends him to 2004, where he is Widmore's trusted assistant and meets Claire at LAX. He is tasked with bringing Charlie to an event where Daniel, a musician, will be performing with him. Charlie tells him that, while choking, he saw visions of himself with Claire, and drives Desmond's car into the water in order to see her again. Desmond rescues him but starts having visions of his time on the island. He hears that Penny Widmore is on the guest list for Daniel's event; Eloise Hawking forbids him from looking further, but Daniel tells him that he has also been seeing the island and directs him to Penny. Desmond passes out when she shakes his hand and wakes up in 2007, where Sayid rescues him. Back in 2004, Penny accepts his offer of a date and he goes after the Flight 815 manifest, saying that he needs to "show them something."
115	12	"Everybody Loves Hugo"	Daniel Attias	Edward Kitsis & Adam Horowitz	Hurley	April 13, 2010	9.48
Hurley meets Libby, who remembers their relationship, and goes to see her in Santa Rosa at Desmond's encouragement. They go on a date and kiss, causing Hurley to remember, while Desmond runs Locke over with his car. On the island, Michael's spirit warns Hurley that he needs to stop Flight 316 from being destroyed. Ilana blows herself up by accident, and when the survivors go to the Black Rock to get more dynamite, Hurley rigs it to explode. He claims that Jacob told him to talk to the Man in Black, privately telling Jack that this is a lie, though Jack pledges his allegiance anyway. Sayid delivers Desmond to the Man in Black, who throws him down a well. Hurley's group arrives to talk.
116	13	"The Last Recruit"	Stephen Semel	Paul Zbyszewski & Graham Roland	various	April 20, 2010	9.53
Sawyer and Miles arrest Sayid for the shooting at Keamy's. Desmond runs into Claire and, realizing she is struggling with adoption, directs her to his lawyer, Ilana. As she is also working with Jack on Christian's will, she introduces the half-siblings. Jack is called away to operate on Locke, while Sun is brought to the same hospital and recovers. On the island, the Man in Black confirms that he took Christian's form to manipulate Jack and Claire. Widmore's lieutenant Zoe demands that he return Desmond. Sayid is ordered to kill Desmond in order for Nadia to be revived, but Desmond convinces him not to. Kate leads the survivors to the Elizabeth and convinces Claire to join them. They plan to escape the island on the sub, but Jack decides he needs to kill the Man in Black and jumps overboard to meet him. The survivors arrive at Hydra Island, where Sun and Jin reunite and Zoe calls off the deal with Sawyer.
117	14	"The Candidate"	Jack Bender	Elizabeth Sarnoff & Jim Galasso	Jack & Locke	May 4, 2010	9.59
As Jack bonds with Claire, a recovered Locke turns down his offer of a surgery to make him walk again. Perplexed, Jack tracks down Cooper and finds him in a vegetative state, learning from Locke that he was the pilot of a flight (his first one) that crashed with Cooper aboard, crippling them both. Jack insists that he does not need to punish himself by refusing the surgery, but Locke leaves. On the island, the Man in Black saves Sawyer's group from Widmore but finds that Flight 316 is rigged with a bomb and decides to escape on the sub, which Sawyer asks Jack to prevent. Jack pushes the Man in Black into the water and abandons Claire as the sub dives, but realizes that the Man in Black put the bomb in his backpack. Sayid dies trying to get it off the sub, while Sun is trapped under debris and Jin drowns with her as the sub floods.
118	15	"Across the Sea"	Tucker Gates	Carlton Cuse & Damon Lindelof	Jacob & Man in Black	May 11, 2010	10.32
Claudia, a pregnant castaway, has her twins, Jacob and the Man in Black, delivered by an island native who kills her and raises them as her own. She uses her power to prevent them from harming each other and shows them the island's "heart," intending to make one of them its protector. Claudia's ghost tells the Man in Black the truth about his parentage, and he goes to live with her stranded shipmates. Thirty years later, they are trying to leave by digging where they find pockets of electromagnetism, with the Man in Black building a wheel around one of these spots. His mother finds out, fills the hole, and kills his people, while also making Jacob the island's immortal protector. The Man in Black kills her, so Jacob throws him into the heart, destroying his physical form and turning him into smoke. Jacob places his and their mother's body at rest in a cave, where they are discovered by Jack two thousand years later. (Note: As depicted in "House of the Rising Sun".)
119	16	"What They Died For"	Paul Edwards	Edward Kitsis & Adam Horowitz & Elizabeth Sarnoff	various	May 18, 2010	10.47
Locke agrees to Jack's offer of surgery. Desmond recovers Christian's coffin and beats Ben up, making him remember the island, then turns himself in to the police. As he, Kate, and Sayid are transported to county prison, Hurley arrives and pays off the driver, Ana Lucia, to free them, whereupon they all leave for Daniel's concert. On the island, Jacob takes his ashes and burns them to end his time in the mortal world, explaining to the remaining candidates that he chose them because they were hurt, lonely people like himself and he needed one of them to take his place. Jack agrees and is made the protector. While Ben gets C4 to destroy Flight 316, he is confronted by Zoe and Widmore when the Man in Black arrives. He kills Zoe and threatens to kill Penny if Widmore does not tell him how to get off the island. Widmore starts to explain that he brought Desmond back because of his resistance to electromagnetism, only for Ben to kill him. They find that Desmond has escaped the well.
120 121	17 18	"The End"	Jack Bender	Damon Lindelof & Carlton Cuse	various	May 23, 2010	13.57
The survivors begin to remember the island as they encounter each other; Kate helps Claire give birth to Aaron at the concert with Charlie present; Sayid rescues Shannon from an assault; and Juliet, David's mother, gives Sun an ultrasound (Note: In reference to the same thing happening on the island in "D.O.C.".) and meets Sawyer. On the island, Desmond, having been rescued by the Nadlers, is taken by the Man in Black. Able to resist the heart's energy and believing that deactivating it will let him go home, Desmond complies, only for the island to start sinking. With the Man in Black mortal after the heart's shutdown, he and Jack fight and he stabs Jack. Kate shoots him and Jack kicks him off a cliff to his death. Jack and Kate affirm their love and she leaves to get Claire on Flight 316, flown by Lapidus. Everyone but Jack, Hurley, Ben, and Desmond take off, with Jack making Hurley the new protector, who makes Ben his advisor and plans to get Desmond home. Jack fixes the heart. Off the island, the survivors meet in a church while Ben stays outside and apologizes to a mobile Locke for killing him out of jealousy. Jack finds Christian's coffin and regains his memories. Christian explains that their current reality is a purgatory where they are meant to find each other before moving on to the afterlife. As the survivors emotionally reunite and Christian opens the doors, a dying Jack watches Flight 316 leave the island as Vincent lies at his side.

== Home media release ==
Lost: The Complete Sixth and Final Season
Set details		Special features	
18 episodes; 5-disc set; 1.78:1 aspect ratio; Subtitles: English, Spanish, French; English (Dolby Digital 5.1 Surround) – DVD; English (DTS-HD Master Audio 5.1 Surround) – Blu-ray; Audio Commentaries; Runtime: 807 minutes		Audio commentaries on: "LA X (Part 1)" by Damon Lindelof and Carlton Cuse; "Dr. Linus" by Edward Kitsis, Adam Horowitz, Michael Emerson; "Ab Aeterno" by Melinda Hsu Taylor, Gregg Nations, Nestor Carbonell; "Across the Sea" by Damon Lindelof and Carlton Cuse; "Lost on Location"; "The New Man in Charge"; "The End: Crafting a Final Season"; "A Hero's Journey"; "See You in Another Life, Brotha"; "Lost in 815 – A Crash Course"; "Deleted Scenes"; "Lost Bloopers"; Blu-ray exclusive; "Lost University"	
Release dates
United States; Canada	United Kingdom	Mexico	Australia; New Zealand
August 24, 2010	September 13, 2010	October 8, 2010	October 20, 2010
