= 316 (Lost) =

- Lost episode
- Jack (Matthew Fox) listens as Hawking (Fionnula Flanagan) explains to Ben (Michael Emerson), Sun (Yunjin Kim) and Desmond (Henry Ian Cusick) how they will return to the island.
- Episode no.: Season 5 Episode 6
- Directed by: Stephen Williams
- Written by: Damon Lindelof; Carlton Cuse
- Production code: 507
- Original air date: February 18, 2009
- Running time: 43 minutes

Guest appearances
- Fionnula Flanagan as Eloise Hawking; Jeff Fahey as Frank Lapidus; Saïd Taghmaoui as Caesar; Zuleikha Robinson as Ilana; Mary Mara as Jill; Raymond J. Barry as Ray Shephard; Kavita Patil as Rupa Krishnavani; P. D. Mani as Nabil; Rebecca Hazlewood as Nalini; Patti Hastie as Barfly; Glen Bailey as Magician; Ned Van Zandt as Mr. Dorsey

Episode chronology
← Previous "This Place Is Death"	Next → "The Life and Death of Jeremy Bentham"
- Lost season 5

"316" is the sixth television episode of the fifth season of ABC's Lost. The 92nd episode of the show overall, "316" aired on February 18, 2009, on ABC in the United States, and was simulcast on A in Canada. The episode was written by showrunners and executive producers Damon Lindelof and Carlton Cuse and directed by Stephen Williams.

In 2007, having recruited Sun-Hwa Kwon, Jack Shephard and Benjamin Linus find a way to return to the Island. Jack makes a last-ditch effort to recruit the other "Oceanic Six" survivors.

== Plot ==
Jack Shephard (Matthew Fox) opens his eyes and wakes up in the middle of the island again. Hearing screaming, he finds Kate Austen (Evangeline Lilly) and Hugo "Hurley" Reyes (Jorge Garcia) on a lake. They realized they have returned to the island. 46 hours earlier, Eloise Hawking (Fionnula Flanagan) receives Jack, Desmond Hume (Henry Ian Cusick), Sun-Hwa Kwon (Yunjin Kim) and Ben Linus (Michael Emerson) in a church. (Note: As depicted in This Place is Death.) She takes them to a Dharma Initiative station underneath the church called the Lamp Post, which was used by Dharma to find the island; since the island is constantly moving, they developed a way to predict where it would be at a given time. Eloise mentions that the group only has 36 hours to get on Ajira Airways Flight 316, a Boeing 737-300, in order to return to the island. Desmond refuses, citing his previous encounter with her, (Note: As depicted in Flashes Before Your Eyes.) and leaves. Eloise then tells Jack in private that he must bring something that belonged to his father Christian Shephard (John Terry) with him on the flight and also gives him John Locke's (Terry O'Quinn) suicide note.

That evening, Jack gets a call informing him that his grandfather Ray (Raymond J. Barry) has attempted to escape his nursing home. The next day, Jack goes to the nursing home and finds an old pair of Christian's shoes and decides to take them with him. Later, Jack returns to his apartment, where he finds Kate waiting for him, in his bed. He asks her where her adoptive son Aaron is, but Kate tells Jack that if he wants her to get back to the island, he must never ask her about Aaron. Then they kiss passionately and fall into bed. The next morning, Jack receives a phone call from a severely beaten Ben, (Note: This event is seen in The Variable.) who tells Jack that he must go to a butcher shop and retrieve Locke's dead body. Jack does so, putting Christian's shoes on Locke's feet in the process. He also leaves the suicide note in Locke's pocket.

At the airport, Jack, Kate, Sun, and Hurley all board Flight 316. Hurley buys up all the remaining seats on the plane, in order to spare the lives of potential passengers. Sayid Jarrah (Naveen Andrews) also boards the plane, in the custody of Ilana (Zuleikha Robinson). Ben is last to board the plane, which momentarily disquiets Hurley. Also on board is Caesar (Saïd Taghmaoui). During the flight, Jack hears the captain's voice, and realizes that Frank Lapidus (Jeff Fahey) is piloting the plane. Jack approaches the cockpit and greets Frank, who upon seeing the Oceanic 815 survivors, realizes that they are going back to the island. Locke's suicide note is removed by the airport staff when checking the casket and is given to Jack. He finally reads it, which says, "Jack, I wish you had believed me." The 737 hits turbulence and there is a flash of white light similar to that caused by the time shifts. The first scene replays, following which, Jack, Kate and Hurley are found by Jin-Soo Kwon (Daniel Dae Kim), who is driving a Dharma van and wearing a Dharma jumpsuit. (Note: The events coming to this point are seen in LaFleur.)

== Production ==
This episode and "The Life and Death of Jeremy Bentham" were written at the same time by executive producers Lindelof and Cuse. "The Life and Death of Jeremy Bentham" was originally meant to be aired first, but the order was switched because they felt it made more sense and was "cooler" and "there is probably some good information to get in '316' before."

The painting Ben shows Jack in the chapel above the Lamp Post station is "The Incredulity of Saint Thomas" by Caravaggio.

== Reception ==
13.161 million American viewers watched the episode's premiere.

IGN's Chris Carabott wrote that Frank's return in the episode was shocking, but seemed as though it was meant to be. He opined that: "The chances of Frank being on that plane are astronomical and the fact that he was supposed to be the pilot of Flight 815 just makes the situation all the more unusual. His appearance in this episode is absurd but after four and a half seasons of Lost it makes perfect sense." James Yates of the Staten Island Advance wrote that it was "great" to see Frank again, as he had missed the character's presence, and hoped he would play a major part upon returning to the island.
