= The Substitute (Lost) =

- Lost episode
- Episode no.: Season 6 Episode 4
- Directed by: Tucker Gates
- Written by: Elizabeth Sarnoff; Melinda Hsu Taylor
- Production code: 604
- Original air date: February 16, 2010
- Running time: 42 minutes

Guest appearances
- L. Scott Caldwell as Rose Nadler; Billy Ray Gallion as Randy Nations; Kenton Duty as Boy; Joshua Smith as Kid; Katey Sagal as Helen Norwood; Suzanne Krull as Lynn Karnoff; Eddie L. Cavett as Courier

Episode chronology
← Previous "What Kate Does"	Next → "Lighthouse"
- Lost season 6

"The Substitute" is the fourth television episode of the American Broadcasting Company's sixth season of the serial drama television series Lost and 107th episode overall. The episode aired on February 16, 2010, on ABC. It was directed by Tucker Gates and written by executive producer Elizabeth Sarnoff and producer Melinda Hsu Taylor. John Locke is the character the episode is centered on.

In 2007, The Man in Black, while impersonating John Locke (Terry O'Quinn), attempts to recruit James "Sawyer" Ford (Josh Holloway) and reveals the survivors' purpose on the Island. Meanwhile, Jacob's (Mark Pellegrino) bodyguards, led by Ilana Verdansky (Zuleikha Robinson), decide to bury the corpse of the real John Locke. In the "flash-sideways", Locke, still using a wheelchair, deals with the difficulties of his life.

== Plot ==
=== 2004 (flash-sideways timeline) ===
John Locke (Terry O'Quinn) arrives at his home, after returning from Australia on Flight 815. He is greeted by his fiancée, Helen Norwood (Katey Sagal), whom he is set to marry shortly, in a wedding also apparently to be attended by his father. Helen encourages Locke to call Dr. Jack Shephard (Matthew Fox), who previously offered to evaluate Locke's condition. Locke declines to do so because he does not believe in miracles and wants Helen to love him for who he is; they reaffirm their love for one another.

Locke returns to work, where his supervisor, Randy (Billy Ray Gallion), confronts Locke about Locke's failure to attend a company conference while in Sydney. Locke attempts to apologize, but Randy fires him. While leaving the building, Locke comes into contact with Hugo "Hurley" Reyes (Jorge Garcia), the owner of the company, who refers Locke to a temp agency that he also owns. At the temp agency, Rose Nadler (L. Scott Caldwell) sympathizes with Locke's handicap because of her own battle with cancer. Rose denies his request to work at a construction company because his handicap will make this impossible. In addition, Locke tells Helen why he lost his job and admits that he went to Australia to go on a walkabout, but was not allowed to do so.

Rose finds him work as a substitute teacher at a school. There, Ben Linus (Michael Emerson) also works as a history teacher.

=== 2007 (original timeline) ===
The Man in Black, in the form of Locke, attempts to recruit both Richard Alpert (Nestor Carbonell) and James "Sawyer" Ford (Josh Holloway) for his quest to leave the island. Sawyer realizes that the Man in Black is not Locke, because Locke was always scared and the Man in Black is not. He separately promises each of them answers about the island; Richard refuses and Sawyer agrees to travel with him. While in the jungle, they both see a young boy (the Man in Black is surprised that Sawyer can see him as well), whom the Man in Black chases. The boy tells him, "You know the rules; you can't kill him." Enraged, the Man in Black declares "don't tell me what I can't do," a phrase that the real Locke frequently used in the past. Meanwhile, Richard speaks with Sawyer, claiming that the Man in Black's true intention is to kill everyone on the island, but runs away before he can explain further after seeing "Locke" returning.

"Locke" leads Sawyer to a cave, after descending via a ladder made of rope and bamboo, inside of which there are scales holding one black and one white stone. He takes the white stone and throws it into the sea. "Locke" leads Sawyer deeper into the cave, where there are surnames written on the ceiling and walls. The names include his own, Jarrah, Shephard, Reyes, and Kwon. Other names are scratched out and the Man in Black crosses out "Locke". Additionally, six names correspond to one of the numbers (4, 8, 15, 16, 23, and 42 for Locke, Reyes, Ford, Jarrah, Shephard and Kwon, respectively). They were brought to the island by Jacob as candidates to replace him as the guardian of the island. The Man in Black claims that Jacob has manipulated the lives of all of the candidates in order to bring them to the island. Sawyer now has three options: to do nothing, to accept the job and protect the island, or to leave the island with the Man in Black, who claims that protecting the island is pointless as there is nothing to protect it from (similar to what Jack once told the real Locke); Sawyer agrees to leave with him.

At the remains of the statue, Ilana (Zuleikha Robinson) and Ben discuss what happened to her companions; Ben says that the Man in Black killed them all, including Jacob. Upset, Ilana takes ashes of Jacob's body and informs Ben that the Man in Black is now "stuck" in the form of Locke. Outside, she tells the remaining group, Sun-Hwa Kwon (Yunjin Kim) and Frank Lapidus (Jeff Fahey) that they must travel to the temple for protection. Sun insists that they must first bury the real Locke's body and travel to the survivors' original graveyard to do so. They hold an impromptu funeral, where Ben delivers a eulogy and apologizes for murdering Locke.

== Reception ==
The episode has received positive reviews, with many citing it as the best of the first four episodes. Review tally website Metacritic awarded the episode a score of 88 out of 100, indicating "Universal Acclaim". This is up on the previous episodes score of 64 out of 100. Chris Carbot of IGN gave the episode a highly positive review, stating that "Early on it's clear that Lindelof and Cuse are determined to reinvigorate some of the strong character work the show was known for during the first couple of seasons. There are some great examples of this in 'The Substitute'." Overall, he gave the episode a score of 9.4 out of 10. Jeff Jensen of Entertainment Weekly praised the episode and gave a perfect score. Emily VanDerWerff of Los Angeles Times also gave the episode a positive review, stating "There may not have been enough answers for the hyper-mythological crowd (though we got a good deal of interesting conjecture), but it was a great showcase for the finest character "Lost" ever cooked up." Zap2it's Ryan McGee also praised the episode, calling the episode "impossibly good."

However, Maureen Ryan of Chicago Tribune was mixed about the episode, stating "Even as a certified "Lost" fan, I was a little frustrated with the episode at times. I think the cumulative effect of not truly understanding many characters’ motivations is starting to wear on me a bit."
