= What Kate Does =

- Lost episode
- Episode no.: Season 6 Episode 3
- Directed by: Paul Edwards
- Written by: Edward Kitsis; Adam Horowitz
- Production code: 603
- Original air date: February 9, 2010
- Running time: 43 minutes

Guest appearances
- Hiroyuki Sanada as Dogen; William Mapother as Ethan Rom; John Hawkes as Lennon; Rob McElhenney as Aldo; David H. Lawrence XVII as Taxi driver; Dayo Ade as Justin; Daniel Roebuck as Dr. Leslie Arzt; Jeff Kober as Mechanic; Jenni Blong as Lindsey Baskum; Traci Lee Burgard as Officer Rasmussen; Tania Kahale as Nurse; Yasmin Dar as Nurse

Episode chronology
| ← Previous "LA X" | Next → "The Substitute" |
- Lost season 6

"What Kate Does" is the 106th television episode of the American Broadcasting Company's Lost and third episode of the sixth season. It was written by executive producers Edward Kitsis and Adam Horowitz and directed in September 2009 by Paul Edwards. "What Kate Does" was first aired February 9, 2010, on ABC in the United States and on CTV in Canada. Kate Austen is the character on whom the episode is centered.

In December 2007, Kate Austen chases after James "Sawyer" Ford (Josh Holloway), who escapes from the Others' captivity in the island's temple and is grieving over the death of his love Juliet Burke (Elizabeth Mitchell) just hours earlier. In flash sideways to September 22, 2004, Kate assists a pregnant Claire Littleton (Emilie de Ravin) while on the run as a fugitive.

The title alludes to the second season episode "What Kate Did". "What Kate Does" was watched by eleven million Americans and received mixed reviews by audiences and critics alike.

== Plot ==
=== 2004 (flash-sideways timeline) ===
In flash sideways, Kate Austen (Evangeline Lilly) flees LAX in a taxicab she has hijacked, in which a pregnant Claire Littleton (Emilie de Ravin) is a passenger. The cab driver (David H. Lawrence XVII) bails and Kate lets Claire go, keeping all of Claire's possession in her haste. She drives to a chop shop, where a mechanic (Jeff Kober) frees her from handcuffs. While searching for a new outfit, Kate learns that Claire is pregnant. She returns to where she left Claire, returns her luggage and offers her a ride. She drives Claire to the house of Lindsey Baskum (Jenni Blong), the woman who was supposed to adopt her baby, but Lindsey's husband has left her and, devastated, she no longer wants the child. Claire goes into labor on the doorstep and Kate takes her to the hospital, where Claire's doctor is Ethan Goodspeed (William Mapother). The police later come looking for Kate in the hospital, but Claire covers for her, allowing Kate to escape.

=== 2007 (original timeline) ===
Following the events of the previous episode, "LA X", Sayid Jarrah (Naveen Andrews) has come back to life after apparently dying. The Others, led by Dogen (Hiroyuki Sanada) and his translator Lennon (John Hawkes), wish to speak with Sayid, privately. Jack Shephard (Matthew Fox), however, wishes to go with them and starts a fight. James "Sawyer" Ford (Josh Holloway) seizes the opportunity to obtain a gun and announce his departure from the temple, explicitly telling Kate not to follow him. The Others send Kate, Jin-Soo Kwon (Daniel Dae Kim) and two of their own, including Aldo (Rob McElhenney), to bring Sawyer back. Meanwhile, Dogen brings Sayid to a room, where ash is blown on him, followed by being given an electric shock and then burned with a poker. Dogen later explains to Jack that he has diagnosed Sayid as being infected and gives Jack a pill for Sayid to take. Jack refuses and takes the pill himself, which Dogen hurriedly forces him to regurgitate, revealing that the pill is in fact poison. He explains that the infection, upon reaching Sayid's heart, will remove any trace of the person he once was, and adds that it has happened to Jack's half-sister, Claire.

In the jungle, Kate, Jin and the Others come across a trap; Kate activates the trap and overcomes the Others. Jin and Kate split up; Kate follows Sawyer's trail, while Jin begins to search for his wife, Sun-Hwa Kwon (Yunjin Kim). Kate finds Sawyer at the Dharma Initiative's barracks, in the house where he and Juliet Burke (Elizabeth Mitchell) had previously lived for three years. He retrieves an engagement ring he had hidden and later talks with Kate at Dharma's dock. He explains that he planned to propose to Juliet and that he blames himself for her death, saying that he convinced her to stay on the island with him because he was lonely. Meanwhile, Jin is caught by the Others, who want to kill him instead of taking him back. Jin runs off but is caught in a beartrap. Suddenly, someone shoots his captors and Jin is shocked to see that the shooter is Claire.

== Reception ==
The episode has received mixed reviews. Critical review aggregate website Metacritic awarded "What Kate Does" a score of 64 out of 100, indicating "generally favorable reviews"; however, this was down significantly from the previous episode's 89 and Bonnie Covel of About.com noted that "'What Kate Does' brought us a bit of negativity. In general, fans just didn't like the episode".

"What Kate Does" was largely considered to be a step down from the season premiere in pacing, revelations and writing; Mike Hale of The New York Times described the episode as "contemplative", "anticlimactic" and "subdued" and the flash sideways as "kind of boring and seemingly pointless." Chris Carabott of IGN, who gave the episode a score of 7.3 summed up that " 'What Kate Does' slows the pace down significantly from last week and focuses on telling a character-driven story. This is a welcome change; especially after the heavily plot-driven season five. However, with questions to answer and so much ground to cover during this final season, a better balance between plot and character wouldn't have been such a bad thing." Alan Sepinwall of The Star-Ledger wrote, "Maybe I'll enjoy the 2004 scenes more when we get to some other characters … but this week it was largely a distraction from all that was happening on the island. And even the island scenes were only sometimes satisfying." Further explanations for the generally less positive reception came from Entertainment Weekly's Jeff Jensen with "Lost has a habit of following up its premiere extravaganzas with scaled-down follow-ups that seek to ground the audience and orient them to a more deliberate pace to the season" and Emily VanDerWerff of the Los Angeles Times explained, "Kate episodes … have notoriously tricky relationships with [fans]. Kate's one of the show's most important characters, for sure, but she's also one of the series' most obvious missed opportunities … Lost isn't very good, period, at creating female characters … the show doesn't quite know how to write a woman of action who's also in love … many of the show's Kate flashbacks are just plain silly … there have been a lot of pretty dire Kate episodes." Whitney Matheson of USA Today said that she "wanted to stab Kate with a hot poker" after watching "What Kate Does".

Josh Holloway's supporting performance as a grieving Sawyer was commended by Carabott of IGN, who said that his acting on the dock as he cried and revealed to Kate that he was going to ask Juliet to marry him was "one of Josh Holloway's best scenes of the entire series." Holloway's acting was called "wrenching" by Jensen of Entertainment Weekly, "[t]errific" by Maureen Ryan of the Chicago Tribune, "stellar" by Chuck Barney of the San Jose Mercury News, "moving (sometimes)" by Rob Cohen of The Huffington Post, "so palpable" by Noel Murray of The A.V. Club ("Grade: B") and "believable and moving" by VanDerWerff of the LA Times, who further said clarified that "There's no better actor for man tears in this cast". Sean Stangland of the Daily Herald speculated that Holloway might be worthy of a Primetime Emmy Award by the end of the season. Sepinwall of The Star-Ledger felt that Holloway's presence excelled the lead performance as Kate by Evangeline Lilly, whom he identified as "one of the less compelling members of the cast", opining that "Being in Josh Holloway's orbit tends to bring out a spark in Lilly that isn't always there opposite other characters and the scene at the dock was a strong example of that." VanDerWerff of the LA Times agreed that Lilly was believable in the scene and commented that Lilly has improved as an actress since the show started, but has been relegated to playing a character in a tired love triangle for much of the show's history. James Poniewozik of Time was more positive toward her, writing that "Lilly is playing her exactly right, as someone who's always had to balance a desire to do the right thing with circumstances that have forced her to look out for her self-interest." Ken Tucker of Entertainment Weekly admired Lilly's subtlety and said, "you believe this woman, who can be so adorable that she can withstand Sawyer’s nickname of “Freckles,” is entirely capable of killing someone." Sepinwall of The Star-Ledger also commented, "I quite like the gravity and mystery of Hiroyuki Sanada's performance as Dogen, and I was even more intrigued by how un-Sayid-like Naveen Andrews seemed, seeming so timid and confused and in pain … as Sayid the torturer was himself tortured"; Poniwozik of Time also appreciated Andrews's work.

Jack's character development was another highlight for critics, including Carabott of IGN, Murray of The A.V. Club, and Jonathan Toomey of TV Squad. Jensen of Entertainment Weekly explained, "The New and Improved With 70% More Likability Jack that brought some dazzle back to Kate's eyes was clearly a man who had learned some lessons about how the Others do business." Jensen commended how Jack "confessed the limits of his knowledge and power" and his actions in all subsequent scenes from the episode. Poniewozik of Time was annoyed by the Others refusing to answer questions, but stated that "here I'm willing to forgive that for setting up the genius scene of Jack surprise-popping the poison pill." In contrast, Eric Deggans of the St. Petersburg Times said, "Another thing I find supremely annoying about Lost: its insistence on returning again and again to the show's most uninteresting characters, including damaged, self-pitying control freak Jack." Deggans was negative toward "What Kate Does", stating that "Episodes like this one can make real Lost fans feel like dopes. Already, you're taking heaps of abuse from friends who accuse you of slavishly following a series which makes no sense—then along comes a 60-minute workout like this one which proves their point all too well." Daniel of TMZ, who gave the episode a "D" grade, reacted uniquely with "The only thing in the history of Lost that has seemed more out of place than the part in Jack's hair was Nikki and Paulo. I can't take anything he says seriously."

Ryan McGee of Zap2it stated that it by no means compared to "LA X", but stated that it "contain[ed] scenes of incredible beauty, based on character work and stakes earned over five seasons [that] made it a fine, if imperfect, hour." McGee also commented that the scene in which Claire arrives at the hospital and is helped by Ethan as "freakin' outstanding" and called "What Kate Does" "one of the funniest in the show's history. Aldo, Hurley, and Miles all got off plenty of zingers, which will be necessary in a season in which both mythological and dramatic stakes are raising higher and higher each week." VanDerWerff of the LA Times, Ryan of the Chicago Tribune, Sepinwall of The Star-Ledger, Jensen of Entertainment Weekly and Mark Medley of the National Post also found the episode to contain humorous lines.

This episode was watched by 11 million American viewers and 1.57 million Canadian viewers.
