= Ilana Verdansky =

Character from the American mystery fiction television series Lost

- Lost character
- Zuleikha Robinson as Ilana Verdansky
- First appearance: "316"
- Last appearance: "The Last Recruit"
- Created by: J. J. Abrams; Damon Lindelof
- Portrayed by: Zuleikha Robinson

In-universe information
- Species: Human
- Gender: Female
- Occupation: Bounty hunter Lawyer
- Nationality: Unknown (possibly Russian or Israeli)

Ilana Verdansky is a fictional character on the ABC television series Lost played by Zuleikha Robinson. Ilana is introduced in the sixth episode of the fifth season of Lost as an officer boarding Ajira Airways Flight 316, with Sayid in her custody. However, as her storyline progresses, it is revealed that she is someone deeply connected to the Island and to Jacob, the Island's highest authority figure. Ilana is killed when a bag of dynamite she is carrying explodes when she sets it on the ground too roughly.

== Arc ==
Prior to travelling to the island, Ilana is seen bandaged and recuperating in a Russian hospital. She is visited by Jacob (Mark Pellegrino), who asks her to help him by guarding six candidates to succeed him in his role on the island. Ilana travels to Los Angeles, where she apprehends candidate Sayid Jarrah (Naveen Andrews), and forcibly escorts him onto Ajira Airways Flight 316. The plane crashes on Hydra Island, a short distance from the main island.

Ilana and her cohort Bram (Brad William Henke) take leadership of the Flight 316 survivors and arm themselves. Their group transport a large metal crate which they found on the plane to the main island. They visit Jacob's cabin, and upon finding it empty, burn it to the ground. They then travel to Jacob's home in the statue of Taweret, opening the crate to reveal the body of former candidate John Locke (Terry O'Quinn) to Richard Alpert (Nestor Carbonell) and a group of Others who had believed Locke to be their leader.

Ilana's team confront the Man in Black—the being appearing in Locke's form—inside the statue. They learn that Jacob has been killed, and are then killed themselves by the Man in Black. After gathering Jacob's ashes and burying Locke's body, Ilana leads her fellow Flight 316 survivors Ben Linus (Michael Emerson), Sun-Hwa Kwon (Yunjin Kim) and Frank Lapidus (Jeff Fahey) to the island temple. They arrive to find the temple under attack by the Man in Black. Ilana ushers the group, joined by Miles Straume (Ken Leung) into a hidden room to protect them. As they escape, Ilana asks Miles, who is a medium, how Jacob died. She learns that he was murdered by Ben, who she tells that Jacob was the closest thing she had to a father, before forcing him to dig his own grave. The Man in Black frees Ben, who escapes into the jungle and retrieves a rifle. Ilana chases and confronts him. Ben explains his motivations for killing Jacob, and Ilana forgives him, allowing him to rejoin their group.

The group are joined at their camp by Richard, and candidates Jack Shephard (Matthew Fox) and Hugo "Hurley" Reyes (Jorge Garcia). Ilana tells Richard that Jacob instructed her to find him, and asks what they should do next. Richard says that they must prevent the Man in Black from leaving the island by blowing up the Ajira plane. Ilana then travels to the Black Rock, an 1800s sail ship shipwrecked on the island, which contains dynamite. She returns with four sticks of dynamite, which she places in her shoulder bag. She is reminded that the dynamite is unstable. During an argument with Hurley about whether they should go through with their plan of blowing up the plane, Ilana drops her bag to the ground. The impact triggers an explosion, killing her instantly.

=== Afterlife ===
In the alternate 2004 timeline, Ilana is an attorney. Desmond Hume (Henry Ian Cusick) catches up with Claire Littleton (Emilie de Ravin) again and advises her to consult the lawyer he was about to meet before committing to the adoption agency. This turns out to be Ilana, who has already been looking for Claire. Ilana, as the family attorney for the Shephards, knew that Claire had been named in Christian Shephard (John Terry)'s will. She introduces Claire to her half-brother, Jack Shephard. The series finale, "The End", revealed that the "alternate timeline" was in fact a form of purgatory for the characters, after their respective deaths, waiting to move on. Ilana, who is credited at the beginning of the episode, does not appear in the episode; as such, she is not among those characters who "move on" to their afterlives.

== Development ==
The casting call for Ilana described her as "a European female in her late 20s to early 30s who possesses great intelligence, but who's also dangerous as all get out. She's alluring and apparently used to getting her own way." On September 4, 2008, Michael Ausiello of Entertainment Weekly reported that actress Zuleikha Robinson had been cast in the role. Executive producer Carlton Cuse initially likened the character to Heath Ledger's Joker from The Dark Knight, stating that; "There was something very unsettling about the way the Joker kept telling different stories about his background — something very similar to what we had planned for Ilana." On the character's introduction, fellow executive producers Edward Kitsis and Adam Horowitz explained how the negative audience reaction to Nikki and Paulo, introduced in Lost's third season, influenced the way in which they slowly integrated Ilana into the story. Initially cast as a recurring character, Ilana was upgraded to regular character status for season six.

Robinson was told little about her character's background, and initially wondered if she had been to the island before. She concluded, however, that Ilana's knowledge of island locations stemmed from her training to protect the candidates. She was unaware of Ilana's surname, and in one scene carried identification which falsely identified her as 'Mary'. Robinson stated that a season six episode would reveal Ilana's surname to be similar to Radzinsky, it was later confirmed to be Verdansky in "The Last Recruit". Commenting on Ilana's relationship with Jacob and her confrontation with Ben in "Dr. Linus", Robinson explained: "I would think Ilana grew up without a father figure and Jacob became that for her for whatever reason. So when she has the exchange with Ben, it's very personal for her, but at the end of the day she understands she has a job to do and that's more important than the way she feels personally." Robinson later confirmed that Ilana had originally been intended to be Jacob's daughter, however this was later dropped as it was deemed that there was not enough screen time to develop the storyline further in the final season. Also, Cuse has said that there were "greater plans" for Ilana but they decided to spend more time with established characters instead. In the same interview, he also said that Ilana led a "hard and tragic life" that he could not reveal any details of yet.
