= Zuleikha Robinson =

British actress

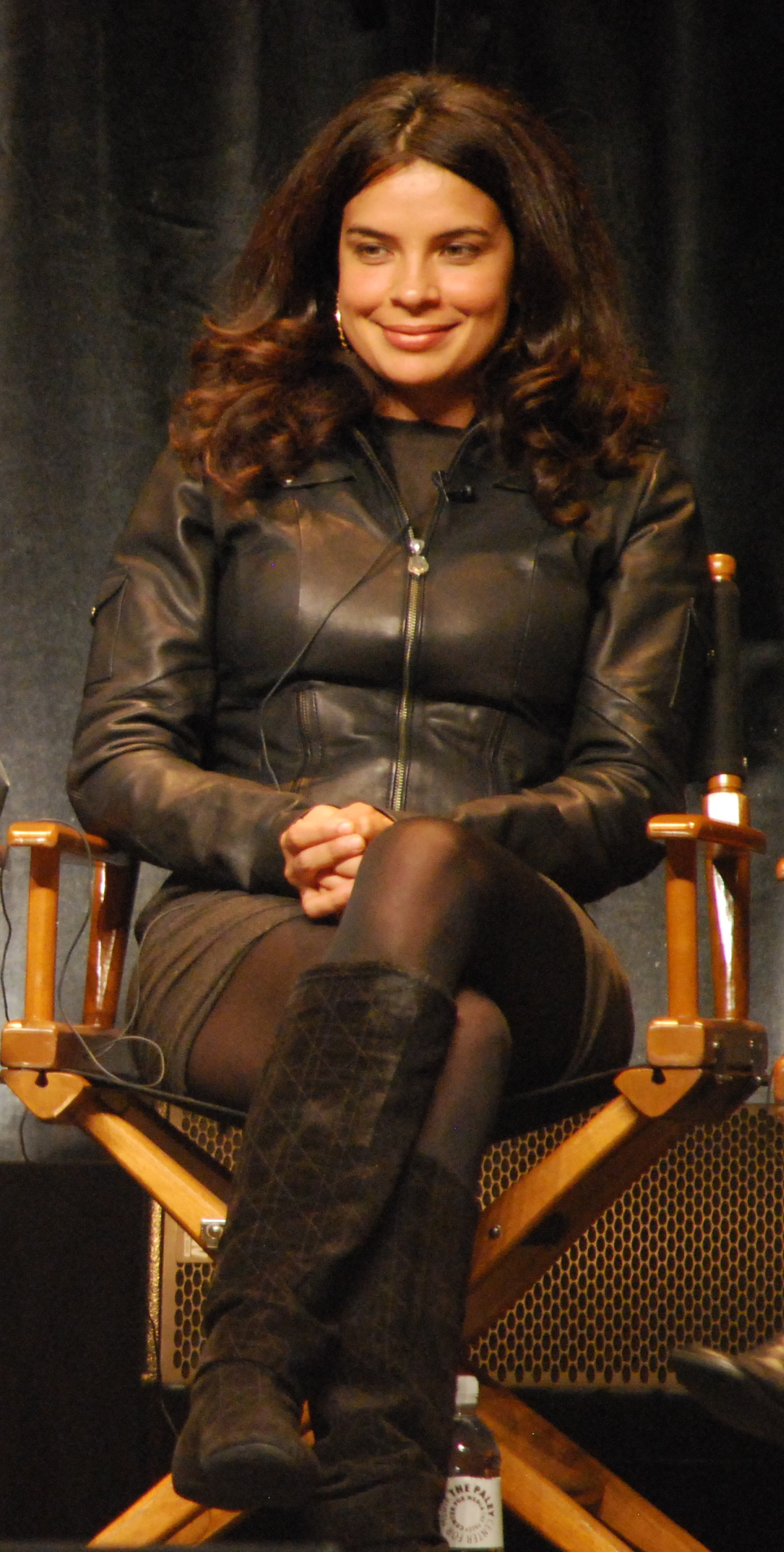
- Robinson in 2010
- Born: 1977 (age 48–49); London, England
- Occupation: Actress
- Years active: 1996–present
- Spouse: Sean Doyle (m. 2009; div. 2014)
- Relatives: Alastair Robinson (brother)

Zuleikha Robinson (born in 1977) is a British actress. She first came to attention as Yves Adele Harlow, a mysterious thief on the 2001 series The Lone Gunmen. She has appeared in the films Hidalgo (2004), The Merchant of Venice (2004) and The Namesake (2006). Robinson was a regular cast member on the series Lost (2009–10), the political thriller Homeland (2012) and the drama The Following (2015). In 2019, she joined the cast of Law & Order: Special Victims Unit for their 21st season, in the recurring role of Assistant District Attorney Vanessa Hadid.

== Early life and education ==
Zuleikha Robinson was born in London, England, and brought up in Thailand, Singapore and Malaysia by an Indian-Burmese mother and an English father. She is also of Scottish, Burmese, Indian, Malay, and Iranian descent.

She is a graduate of the American Academy of Dramatic Arts in Los Angeles.

== Career ==
Robinson made her film debut in the 2000 experimental film Timecode. She gained attention on the 2001 series The Lone Gunmen, part of The X-Files franchise. She played Yves Adele Harlow, a mysterious thief who often aided (and sometimes hindered) the starring trio.

Robinson's first lead role brought her to Morocco, playing a 19th-century Arabian princess named Jazira, opposite Viggo Mortensen and Omar Sharif, in Disney's $80 million Western epic Hidalgo (2004), directed by Joe Johnston. The film tells the story of long-distance endurance horse rider, Frank Hopkins. In 2006, she played a Bengali character called Moushumi Mazumdar in Mira Nair's acclaimed film The Namesake, based on the book of the same name.

In 2007, Robinson had a supporting role in the HBO series Rome, and the following year played Eva Marquez, a NYPD detective, in the Fox police drama New Amsterdam. Robinson joined the cast of Lost in 2009 during its fifth season, as recurring character Ilana Verdansky, and was promoted to series regular for the sixth season. In 2012, she was cast in the second season of Homeland in a recurring role as Roya Hammad. Robinson also played a supporting role in the drama thriller film The Boy.

In 2014, Robinson was cast in Intelligence as Amelia Hayes, Gabriel's wife and a former CIA field officer.

In 2016, Robinson was cast as Lady Capulet in the ABC period drama Still Star-Crossed produced by ShondaLand.

Since 2019, she has a recurring role on Law & Order: Special Victims Unit as Assistant District Attorney Vanessa Hadid, bureau chief of sex crimes at the Manhattan District Attorney's Office.

== Personal life ==
Robinson's brother is field botanist Alastair Robinson.

She was married to short film director Sean Doyle from 2009 to 2014.

== Filmography ==
=== Film ===
Year	Title	Role	Notes
1999	Benefactor: Scenes from an Arrangement	Hope Crowley	Short film
2000	Timecode	Lester Moore's Assistant	
2002	Slash	Suzie	
2004	Hidalgo	Jazira	
2004	The Merchant of Venice	Jessica	
2006	The Namesake	Moushumi Mazumdar	
2009	Fist Full of Love		Short film, also writer
2014	Ask Me Anything	Afreen	
2015	The Boy	Mom	
2016	American Fable	Vera	

=== Television ===
Year	Title	Role	Notes
2001	The Lone Gunmen	Yves Adele Harlow	Series regular, 13 episodes
2002	The X-Files	Yves Adele Harlow / Lois Runce	Episode: "Jump the Shark"
2007	Rome	Gaia	Recurring role, 7 episodes
2008	New Amsterdam	Eva Marquez	Series regular, 8 episodes
2009–10	Lost	Ilana Verdansky	Series regular, 16 episodes Nominated — Monte Carlo TV Festival Award for Outstanding Actress - Drama Series (2010)
2012	Homeland	Roya Hammad	Recurring role, 9 episodes Nominated — Screen Actors Guild Award for Outstanding Performance by an Ensemble in a Drama Series (2013)
2013	The Mentalist	Dr. Sonia Kidd	Episode: "Red in Tooth and Claw"
2013	Covert Affairs	Bianca Manning	Recurring role, 4 episodes
2014	Intelligence	Amelia Vaughn	Recurring role, 3 episodes
2014	Once Upon a Time in Wonderland	Amara	Recurring role, 4 episodes
2014	Kingdom	Allison	Recurring role, 3 episodes
2015	The Following	Gwen	Series regular, 15 episodes
2017	Salvation	Catherine Adams	Episode: "Another Trip Around the Sun"
2017	Still Star-Crossed	Lady Capulet	Series regular, 7 episodes
2017	The Exorcist	Mouse	Series regular, 10 episodes
2019–2020	Law & Order: Special Victims Unit	Bureau Chief Assistant DA Vanessa Hadid	Recurring role, 8 episodes
2021	Evil	Jane Castle	Episode: "F Is for Fire"
2023	Jack Ryan	Zeyara Lemos	6 episodes

== Awards and nominations ==
Year	Award	Category	Work	Result
2010	Gold Derby Award	Ensemble of the Year (with Naveen Andrews, Néstor Carbonell, Henry Ian Cusick, Alan Dale, Emilie de Ravin, Michael Emerson, Jeff Fahey, Matthew Fox, Jorge Garcia, Josh Holloway, Daniel Dae Kim, Yunjin Kim, Ken Leung, Evangeline Lilly & Terry O'Quinn )	Lost	Nominated
2010	Golden Nymph Award	Outstanding Actress in a Drama Series	Lost	Nominated
2013	Screen Actors Guild Award	Outstanding Performance by an Ensemble in a Drama Series (with Morena Baccarin, Timothée Chalamet, Claire Danes, Rupert Friend, David Harewood, Diego Klattenhoff, Damian Lewis, David Marciano, Navid Negahban, Jackson Pace, Mandy Patinkin, Morgan Saylor, Jamey Sheridan & Hrach Titizian)	Homeland	Nominated
