= Special (Lost) =

- Lost episode
- Michael talks to ex-lover Susan after being struck by a car. Susan here proposes her intentions to take Walt with her to her new job in The Netherlands
- Episode no.: Season 1 Episode 14
- Directed by: Greg Yaitanes
- Written by: David Fury
- Cinematography by: Larry Fong
- Editing by: Mark J. Goldman
- Production code: 112
- Original air date: January 19, 2005
- Running time: 43 minutes

Guest appearances
- Tamara Taylor as Susan Lloyd; David Starzyk as Brian Porter; Monica Garcia as Nurse; Natasha Goss as Dagne

Episode chronology
← Previous "Hearts and Minds"	Next → "Homecoming"
- Lost season 1

"Special" is the 14th episode of the first season of the American drama television series Lost. The episode was directed by Greg Yaitanes and written by David Fury. It first aired on ABC in the United States on January 19, 2005. The characters of Michael Dawson (Harold Perrineau) and his son Walt Lloyd (Malcolm David Kelley) are featured in the episode's flashbacks.

"Special" received positive reviews from critics, with praise given to Michael's relationship with Walt and Perrineau's performance. The episode was seen by an estimated 19.69 million household viewers.

== Plot ==
=== Flashbacks ===
In 1997, Michael and his partner, lawyer Susan Lloyd (Tamara Taylor), have a son, Walt. When Walt was only a few months old, Susan accepted a job in Amsterdam and took her child with her. Months later, Michael calls Susan, and she reveals to have started a relationship with her former boss, Brian Porter (David Starzyk). Michael says he is coming to Amsterdam, not for Susan, but to take his son back. Hanging up, Michael storms away but, forgetting to look, walks out into the middle of the road and is hit by an oncoming vehicle. While Michael is in the hospital recovering, Susan appears and says she will be marrying Brian and he wants to adopt Walt as his legal son. Michael refuses; Susan questions his motives, suggesting that Michael is holding on for his own stubborn principles rather than love for his son.

In September 2004, Brian, Susan and Walt live in Sydney, Australia. Walt is hinted to have some sort of supernatural power over his surroundings; when he opens one of his books to a picture of a native bird, and shortly afterward an identical real-life bird fatally slams into a nearby window. Shortly later, Susan dies from an unspecified form of blood disorder. Brian comes to New York to tell this to Michael, and says it was Susan's wish that Michael be given custody. Michael soon sees past this, and realizes Brian does not care for Walt, only pursuing paternal rights in the past to please Susan. He offers Michael plane tickets to and from Sydney, inviting him to come and take Walt. Michael is livid that Brian would willingly abandon Walt, but is confused when Brian says the boy is different, and "things happen when he is around". Michael then goes to Brian's house in Sydney, where he picks up Walt and his dog, Vincent.

=== On the Island ===
On Day 26, October 17, 2004, an annoyed Michael Dawson confronts Walt Lloyd, whom John Locke (Terry O'Quinn) has been teaching how to throw a knife, and enlists his help in scavenging parts from the wreck to build a raft. The next day, Walt tells his dad that he is going to get some water and runs off with his dog, Vincent (Madison). Michael initially accuses Locke of contributing to his son's delinquency despite his repeated warnings, but when he sees that the boy is not with Locke, the two men track Walt into the jungle. Michael risks his own life to save Walt from one of the island's unlikely predators, a polar bear, thus aiding the reconciliation between the two. Michael then gives Walt a wooden box that holds all the letters he wrote to Walt, but his mother never delivered.

Charlie Pace (Dominic Monaghan) recovers Claire Littleton's (Emilie de Ravin) diary from James "Sawyer" Ford (Josh Holloway) with help from Kate Austen (Evangeline Lilly). As he skims through it, hoping to find some mention of him in her musings, he reads her description of a dream about a "black rock" which corresponds to a location on the map that Sayid Jarrah (Naveen Andrews) stole from Danielle Rousseau (Mira Furlan). He shows this to the others, thinking it might be a clue to her whereabouts. However, while looking for Vincent, who disappeared shortly after Walt was attacked by the bear, Locke and Boone Carlyle (Ian Somerhalder) are shocked by the sudden appearance of Claire, stumbling out of the jungle.

== Development ==
"We sort of have ideas. 'Gee, Walt's reading a comic book about polar bears, and a polar bear shows up.' Or, 'Walt is reading a book about birds, and a bird flies into the window.' I know what I mean by it, but I think when the audience starts getting disconnected is when you tell them what to think, which is: Walt is psychic."

— Executive producer Damon Lindelof on developing Walt

"Special" was written by David Fury and directed by Greg Yaitanes. The episode features the father-son characters of Michael and Walt in its flashback scenes. Malcolm David Kelley, the child actor who portrayed Walt, had appeared in various film and television projects since a young age before earning a casting call on Lost. A week after his audition, Kelley was told he had won the part. As he was near the age of 12 when cast, series co-creator Damon Lindelof knew the actor's puberty was eventually going to be a problem and discussed it with J. J. Abrams during filming of the pilot episode. Lindelof recalled in 2014, "There was an inevitability to Malcolm. In fact, casting an actor who... was sort of right on the cusp of blooming, we were in dangerous territory". Once they reached the middle of the season, Lindelof and Carlton Cuse decided to resolve the problem by having Walt be abducted in the season finale.

Lindelof described Walt's abilities as "mythological magic," writing that he "had these kind of psychic abilities in a Stephen King kind of way. Birds are smashing into windows, and we are calling an episode 'Special'." According to writer Nikki Stafford, two situations imply Walt summons animals – he causes a bird to fly into a window while reading a book on birds, and he makes a polar bear attack him after reading a comic book about such a bear. The polar bear was mostly depicted through computer generated imagery, with an animatronic head and puppeteers wearing bear arms being used for close-ups.

== Reception ==
"Special" first aired on January 19, 2005, in the United States. It experienced only a slight decline from the season's earlier high-rated episodes. The episode's premiere earned an estimated 19.69 million American viewers, and finished first in its timeslot. It garnered an overall ratings share of 12.6/19, and in the adult demographic it earned a share of 7.9/21, placing sixth among adults aged 18 to 49.

"Special" was well received by critics. Chris Carabott of IGN called Michael's flashback "heart wrenching" and praised Perrineau's "brilliant performance" at "expressing the heartbreak that Michael is feeling." He rated "Special" with a score of 7.8 out of 10, an indication of a "good" episode. Kirthana Ramisetti from Entertainment Weekly called it the best episode since "Walkabout" because of Michael's character development. She said that one of her favorite scenes of the entire season "was Michael and Walt bonding over the letters and the drawing of the sunburned penguin. It was moving to see these two finally relating to each other as father and son after everything they've been through."

In her 2006 work Finding Lost: The Unofficial Guide, Nikki Stafford considered the episode's flashbacks to be "some of the most emotionally painful ones yet" due to the lack of control over his circumstances. She also praised Monaghan's comic timing. Robert Dougherty, author of the 2008 book Lost Episode Guide for Others: An Unofficial Anthology, classified it as a "must see episode", explaining that it redefined Michael and Walt's relationship to viewers, introduced "new mysteries," and had a good cliffhanger. After the series' conclusion in 2010, IGN ranked "Special" as the 86th best episode of the series, noting that while "Michael was not the most popular character," Perrineau gave a "great performance." On a similar list, the Los Angeles Times ranked "Special" as the 87th best, observing that the episode's few "fantastic moments" were marred by its "terrible, terrible special effects."
