= Whatever the Case May Be =

- Lost episode
- The Key to the suitcase which holds Kate's personal effects.
- Episode no.: Season 1 Episode 12
- Directed by: Jack Bender
- Written by: Damon Lindelof; Jennifer Johnson
- Production code: 110
- Original air date: January 5, 2005
- Running time: 43 minutes

Guest appearances
- L. Scott Caldwell as Rose Nadler; Victor Browne as Jason; Tim Halligan as Mark Hutton; Dezmond Gilla as Baseball hat; Achilles Gacis as Six foot five; Michael Vendrell as Trucker

Episode chronology
← Previous "All the Best Cowboys Have Daddy Issues"	Next → "Hearts and Minds"
- Lost season 1

"Whatever the Case May Be" is the twelfth episode of the first season of Lost. It was directed by Jack Bender and written by Damon Lindelof and Jennifer Johnson. It first aired on January 5, 2005, on ABC. The character of Kate Austen (Evangeline Lilly) is featured in the episode's flashbacks.

== Plot ==
=== Flashbacks ===
Kate is in New Mexico, applying for a loan at a bank using an alias ("Maggie", "Meg", "Miss Ryan"). Three masked men with guns enter and attempt to rob the bank. Kate is thrust to the floor in the chaos. A man tells Kate that they can stop them before he grabs and disarms one. Kate grabs the gun but when the man tells her to shoot the thief she claims that she can't use a gun. One of the thieves pulls Kate into a back room after the situation is handled and they share a kiss, revealing that Kate is a part of the robbery. The man hits Kate to make it look as if she's an innocent civilian, and threatens to kill her unless the manager takes them to the cash vaults. In the back, one of the robbers tells the manager that the whole robbery was Kate's idea. However, she shoots the felons and tells the manager to open the safety deposit box #815 — the true reason for the robbery. The manager opens the safety deposit box and Kate takes the contents inside: a single envelope.

=== On the Island ===
On Day 21, October 12, 2004, while swimming near a waterfall, Kate Austen and James "Sawyer" Ford (Josh Holloway) find a locked Zero Halliburton suitcase among some sunken wreckage and bodies. Kate wants it, but refuses to tell Sawyer what's inside, so he takes it. At the beach, the tide is rising and will soon submerge the fuselage. Shannon Rutherford (Maggie Grace) asks her stepbrother, Boone Carlyle (Ian Somerhalder), what he and John Locke (Terry O'Quinn) do every day when they go out into the jungle, and Boone replies that they're looking for Claire Littleton, who has been kidnapped by the mysterious Ethan Rom. While Shannon complains that Boone should locate food, Boone gets upset; in retaliation he calls her "useless."

Kate enters Sawyer's tent while he's sleeping in an attempt to retrieve the case they found earlier. He wakes up, however, and they struggle, Sawyer playfully flirting with her all the while, until he takes back the case and refuses to give it to her, resulting in Kate leaving.

The next day, Sayid Jarrah (Naveen Andrews) asks Shannon to help him translate Danielle Rousseau's French notes. She asks if Boone put him up to asking her for help because of Boone's earlier comment. Rose Henderson (L. Scott Caldwell) comforts Charlie Pace (Dominic Monaghan) by telling him that what happened to Claire isn't his fault and that he did everything he could. Sawyer tries to pick the lock on the case, much to Michael Dawson's (Harold Perrineau) and Hugo "Hurley" Reyes' (Jorge Garcia) amusement. Michael tells him the only way to open it is with pure force. Sawyer drops the case off a cliff, but it still doesn't open. Kate steals it from him, but Sawyer pins her hands down and gets it back. He tells her that he will give the case to her if she tells him what's inside. She refuses.

Kate goes to Jack Shephard (Matthew Fox) and says the case contains weapons. It belonged to the U.S. Marshal that was escorting her to the United States and the key is buried with him. They dig up the body and Kate pulls out his wallet. Before giving it to Jack, she palms the key, but he catches her.

Sayid becomes impatient with Shannon when her translations do not make any sense. Upset, Shannon runs away, saying that she's useless. Jack gives Sawyer an ultimatum: if he does not hand over the case, Jack will stop giving him antibiotics for his knife wound. Afraid of getting an infection in his wound, Sawyer hands over the case.

At the caves, Jack and Kate open the case. There are guns inside, and a manila envelope, the same which was in the safety box: Jack gives it back to Kate. She opens it and pulls out a toy airplane. When pressured, Kate says it belonged to the man she loved—and killed. She then cries, but receives no sympathy from Jack.

Rose tells Charlie that she believes her husband, Bernard Nadler, who was in the tail section of the plane when it crashed, is still alive. Charlie, distraught, begs Rose for help, and she prays with him. Shannon recognizes Rousseau's notes as lyrics from "La Mer". By her campfire, Kate stares at the toy plane.

== Production ==
The underwater scenes were filmed in a Los Angeles pool, due to the producers having trouble filming it in the ocean, as it had too much silt and waves, and Evangeline Lilly kept being thrown against corals.

== Reception ==
This episode attracted 21.59 million American viewers. The New York Times cited this episode as "a breath of fresh air" when comparing it to the previous few. Myles McNutt of The A.V. Club gave the episode a C+. He explained, "It’s the first time the show has used the flashback structure to actively troll the audience, and it brings the season’s worst episode thus far by nature of the fact that the rest of the episode is almost exclusively focused around the mysteries introduced in the flashback." He summarizes his thoughts on the episode by writing, "It’s not a terrible episode of television, but it fails to strike the balance necessary to make its flashbacks alleviate—rather than exaggerate—the challenge of slowing down the narrative to help stretch each season out into 22 or more episodes." Chris Carabott of IGN gave the episode a 7.2/10, writing that he was troubled that the episode "takes a step back after the conclusion of the last episode", adding that, "It's disappointing to see the lack of momentum carried over." Carabott added that this may have been because it aired "after the Christmas break and it seems that the writers took this as an opportunity to regroup and prepare for the second half of the season."

Ryan McGee of Zap2it was fairly critical of the episode, writing that the episode "has interesting ideas but only semi-successful execution", and that the episode was "a serious let-down after the one-two punch of 'Solitary'/'Raised by Another' and the better-upon-second-viewing 'All Good Cowboys Have Daddy Issues'."
