= Hearts and Minds (Lost) =

- Lost episode
- Boone holds a supposedly dead Shannon in his arms after she is killed by the Smoke Monster
- Episode no.: Season 1 Episode 13
- Directed by: Rod Holcomb
- Written by: Carlton Cuse; Javier Grillo-Marxuach
- Production code: 111
- Original air date: January 12, 2005
- Running time: 42 minutes

Guest appearances
- Charles Mesure as Bryan; Adam Leadbeater as Malcolm; Kelly Rice as Nicole

Episode chronology
← Previous "Whatever the Case May Be"	Next → "Special"
- Lost season 1

"Hearts and Minds" is the thirteenth episode of the first season of the American television series Lost. The episode sees Boone Carlyle (Ian Somerhalder) experience a vision quest, believing his stepsister Shannon (Maggie Grace) to be dead. Through a series of flashbacks, it is revealed that Boone is in love with Shannon, and that they slept together prior to crashing on the island. The episode was directed by Rod Holcomb and written by Carlton Cuse and Javier Grillo-Marxuach.

The writers sought to reveal the backstory of Boone and Shannon by surprising viewers with the nature of their relationship. At the same time, they wanted to use the relationship to bring Boone and Locke closer together, and decided on a vision quest to make this happen. "Hearts and Minds" first aired on January 12, 2005, on ABC. The episode was watched by an estimated 20.81 million viewers and received mixed to negative critical reception. Critics tended to view Shannon and Boone's story as uninteresting, but expressed appreciation for John Locke's (Terry O'Quinn) "darkly mysterious" actions.

== Plot ==
=== Flashbacks ===
Shannon calls Boone and, after he overhears sounds of violence, asks him to come to Sydney. When he gets there, he sees that her boyfriend, Bryan (Charles Mesure), has been beating her. Boone reports this to the police, and reveals that Shannon is his stepsister. While Boone is speaking to the officer, James "Sawyer" Ford (Josh Holloway) is brought to the station handcuffed and shouting in anger. The detective effectively ignores Boone.

Boone offers Bryan $25,000 to break up with Shannon but Bryan asks for $50,000 and Boone agrees. Boone also reveals that Bryan is not the first man he has paid off to leave Shannon alone. Shannon refuses to leave with Boone. He realizes that Shannon lied to him to get the money, and she has done this all the other times he had to pay off her boyfriends. Bryan says that Boone's mother stole money away from her, and she is getting what is rightfully hers. After a brief fight with Bryan in which he is beaten, Boone leaves. That night, a drunk Shannon comes to Boone's hotel room and tells him that Bryan stole the money. She tells Boone that she knows he loves her and, although he first tries to refuse her advances, they sleep together. Later, Shannon persuades Boone not to tell their parents.

=== On the Island ===
On Day 24, October 15, 2004, Boone sees that Shannon Rutherford's (Maggie Grace) relationship with Sayid Jarrah (Naveen Andrews) is getting more personal. Boone tries to tell Sayid that he would be better off staying away from Shannon, but he is ignored.

Boone and John Locke (Terry O'Quinn) have been trying to open the mysterious hatch, but tell the other survivors they are hunting for boar. Hugo "Hurley" Reyes (Jorge Garcia) scolds Boone for not bringing back any boar, but Locke tells Boone that what he and Boone are doing with the hatch is far more important than hunting. At the hatch, Locke makes a paste and tells Boone it is for later. Locke suggests that staring at the hatch will tell them how to open it.

Boone informs Locke he is tired of lying, and wants to tell Shannon about the hatch. Locke knocks him unconscious with the handle of his knife, and Boone awakes to find himself tied up. Locke applies a strange paste on Boone's head wound and leaves a knife embedded in the ground in front of Boone so he'll be able to free himself. Locke explains that he will be able to reach it once he is properly motivated. After several unsuccessful attempts to do so, Boone hears Shannon's screams and the sounds of the 'monster' approaching. This is the impetus he needs, and after a short struggle, and in excruciating pain, he is finally able to reach the weapon. He then frees himself and searches for his sister.

Boone runs through the jungle, and locates Shannon tied to a tree. Boone frees her and they run away from the pursuing monster. The monster takes Shannon, and a distraught Boone later finds her mutilated body by a creek and watches her die. That night Boone returns to the camp and tries to kill Locke, screaming that he had killed his sister, but Locke reveals that Shannon is alive. The paste caused Boone to have a vision that, according to Locke, is crucial to his experience on the island. Boone admits seeing Shannon dead made him feel relieved. Locke says to come with him, and the two disappear into the jungle.

Meanwhile, Kate Austen (Evangeline Lilly) shows Jack Shephard (Matthew Fox) to a garden that Sun-Hwa Kwon (Yunjin Kim) has started. Kate discovers that Sun speaks English when the two are working in the garden, and Sun asks her not to tell anyone. Locke finds Sayid trying to make sense of Danielle Rousseau's maps, and gives him a compass. Sayid tells Jack that according to Locke's compass, north is not where it should be, causing him to believe that the instrument is defective. Hurley and Jin-Soo Kwon (Daniel Dae Kim) spend the day fishing. When Hurley fails to catch anything and accidentally steps on a sea urchin after giving up, Jin treats the wound and later gives Hurley a cleaned fish that's ready to cook.

== Production ==
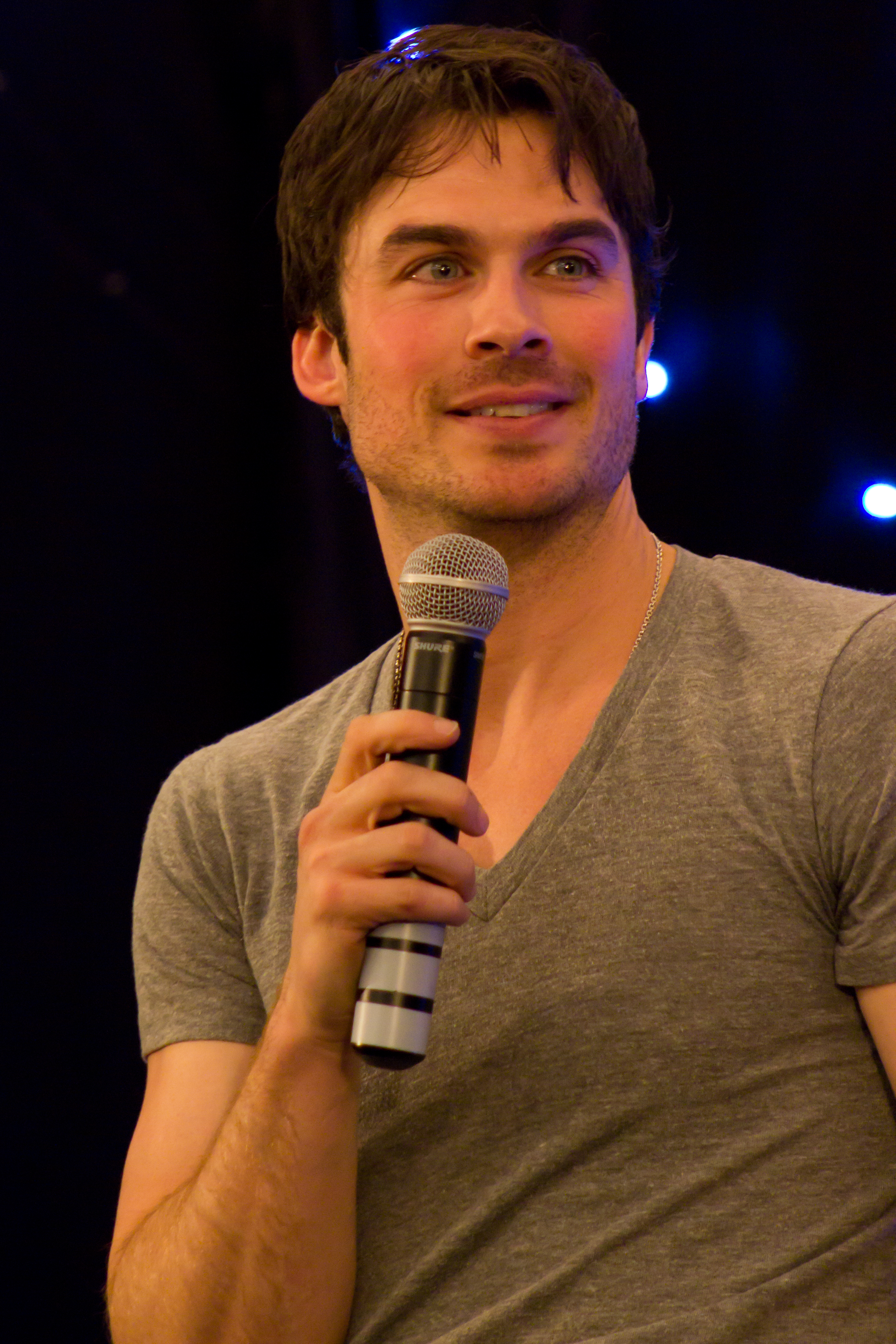
Boone (Ian Somerhalder) was featured in the episode's flashbacks

Boone was the focus of "Hearts and Minds", a character who had not yet had his backstory told. Ian Somerhalder was the first actor cast in the series; while the role required him to find life living in the wild foreign and difficult, the actor was raised on a Louisianan ranch and was thus used to "learn[ing] how to survive." He said, "[Boone] was very fragile in [the Island's] environment, where I wouldn't have been." The episode's guest stars included Charles Mesure as Bryan, Adam Leadbeater as Malcolm, and Kelly Rice as Nicole.

Executive producer Carlton Cuse and supervising producer Javier Grillo-Marxuach, who wrote the episode, decided that its plot would be centered on cementing Boone and Locke's relationship, by making the former go through a test of character. The episode's plot evolved gradually, with the vision quest being one of the first ideas to include. This led to the depiction of the Shannon-Boone relationship – which had not yet been explored – and making it the "axis" on which to tie Locke and Boone together. Cuse said that the series had hit a point narratively where Boone had become Locke's "acolyte," and he needed to "sort of shed his obsession with Shannon in order to move forward in terms of his relationship with Locke."

The producers also thought it would be interesting for there to be more to Shannon and Boone's relationship than just Boone's possessive brotherly interest. According to Cuse, the plot twist had become a Lost characteristic so they wanted to surprise the audience by having the Shannon-Boone relationship be sexual in nature. The idea for the two came from an observation that their bickering resembled an older married couple; to support this, they made the characters step-siblings as it had not yet been established what their sibling bond exactly was.

This was Cuse's first writing credit for Lost, having joined the series during the seventh episode. He desired to cement Boone's relationship with Locke, but was unsure how to connect the two characters in a meaningful way. The writers chose a vision quest but decided to make this "closed to the audience" and not let them know it was even occurring. Initially, it was conceived that Boone would be convinced into eating Locke's drug, but director Rod Holcomb and the writers thought it would have made the hallucination easier to guess, and changed it into spreading the concoction into a head injury.

Locke knocking Boone out "marked a huge turning point" in the development of his character. According to the writers, there was huge debate over whether Locke was good or bad; his decision was meant to be a shocking moment for viewers, since they thought people would view it as a sign that Locke was turning bad. This was characteristic of the series – the writers liked to depict a character in a certain way so that one's opinion would be made up, then they would reveal something else that would change one's mind. Locke's scene with Sayid was introduced late into production, because the episode was running short and Locke did not have scenes without Boone; Sayid's scene with Jack was also added later. Many future plot points are introduced into the episode, such as Sayid observing a magnetical anomaly, main characters crossing paths (Sawyer is being arrested in the police station where Boone is filing a complaint) and Michael's box of drawings, which sets up the following episode, "Special".

== Reception ==
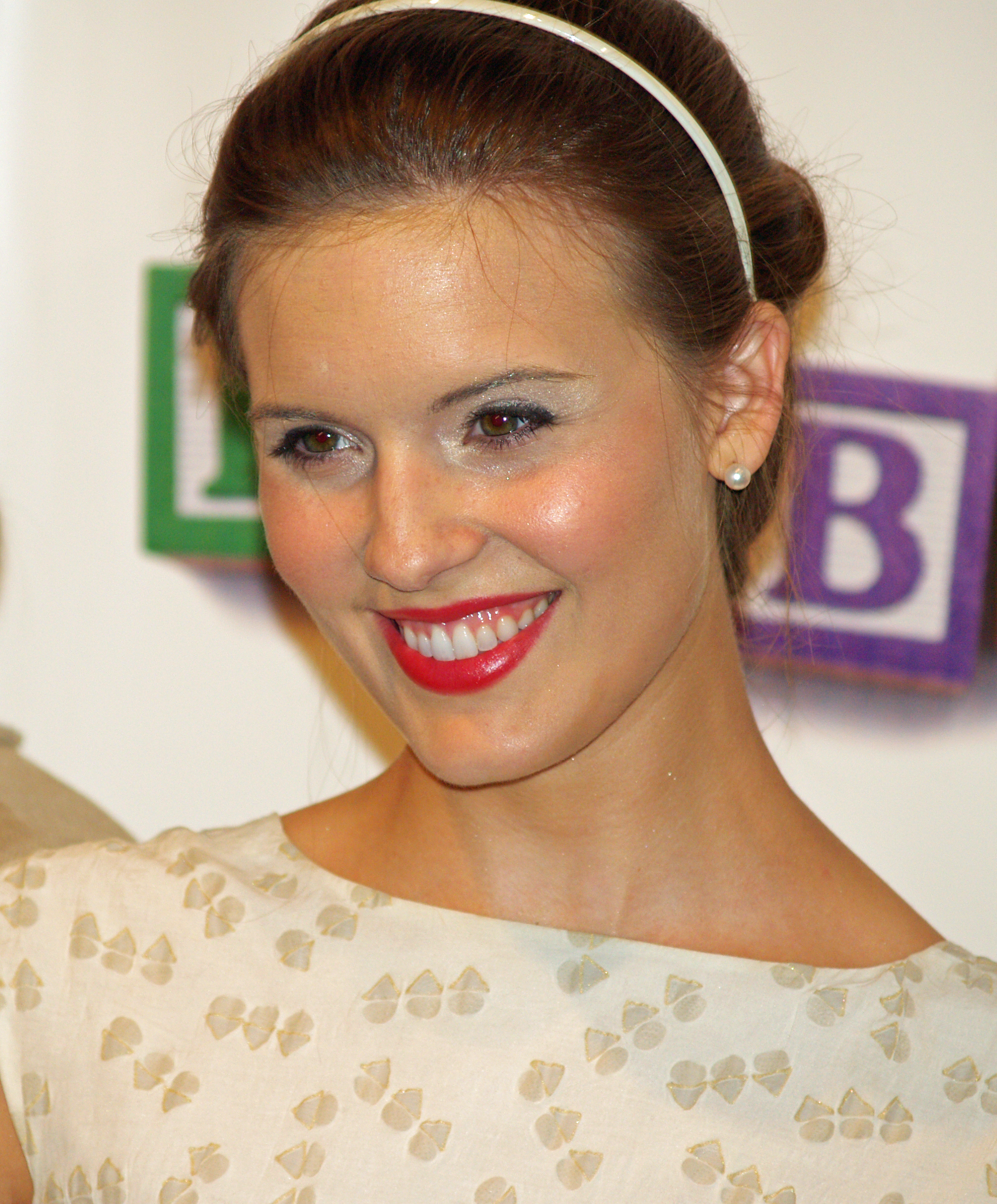
Critics tended to view Shannon's (Maggie Grace) relationship with Boone unfavorably

"Hearts and Minds" first aired on January 12, 2005 in the United States. The episode's broadcast gained an estimated 20.81 million viewers, making it ABC's sixth most watched episode for the week. It earned a ratings share of 7.9/21 among adults aged 18 to 49 and a 4.1/13 share among teenagers, both measures attaining series highs. With this, Lost and Alias helped ABC win the night. It was down 780,000 viewers on the previous episode, "Whatever the Case May Be", but was up 5.12 million on the season average of 15.69 million viewers.

Critical reception of the episode was mixed to negative. Chris Carabott of IGN criticized the decision to focus the episode around Shannon and Boone, characters he felt "[brought] very little to the table", at the expense of other "more intriguing" storylines and characters. He called the episode "awkward and uninspired", though commented that it was saved by the character development of Locke. Carabott rated the episode 6.6 out of 10, signifying a "passable" episode. Entertainment Weekly writer Adam B. Vary graded the episode with a B+ and praised Somerhalder for bringing "some real pathos to his conflicted feelings for Shannon; he also found Locke to be "at his best when his motivations are darkly mysterious."

Writing for Zap2it, Ryan McGee characterized the episode as having a "weak backstory with a creeptastic ending," although he enjoyed Locke for being "incredibly sage and incredibly terrifying all at once." In her 2006 work Finding Lost: The Unofficial Guide, Nikki Stafford critiqued the writers for having some of the characters act inconsistently with the events of previous episodes, citing Jack and Kate's "jokey and sweet" interactions as an example. Robert Dougherty, author of the 2008 book Lost Episode Guide for Others: An Unofficial Anthology, compared Shannon and Boone's relationship to that of a soap opera. Other than the revelations surrounding their relationship and Locke's actions however, Dougherty did not think the episode would have much of an impact on the series' overall story.

Therese Odell of the Houston Chronicle reviewed the episode twice, once in September 2007, then again following a repeat viewing in July 2009. She called it "profoundly weird", and described it as a "transition episode", noting that on her original viewing she found it irritating, eager for the story to advance, but upon re-watching it enjoyed it more, praising the "lovely exploration of Boone's character". Following the series' conclusion, IGN ranked "Hearts and Minds" 109th out of all episodes, commenting that as few viewers were interested in Shannon and Boone, it was difficult to be interested in an episode centered on them, particularly as it had little long-term impact. A similar ranking of episodes by Emily VanDerWerff for the Los Angeles Times placed "Hearts and Minds" 104th.
