= Exodus (Lost) =

- Lost episodes
- Walt is kidnapped off the raft by the Others
- Episode nos.: Season 1 Episodes 23, 24 & 25
- Directed by: Jack Bender
- Written by: Damon Lindelof; Carlton Cuse
- Cinematography by: Michael Bonvillain
- Editing by: Mark J. Goldman
- Production codes: 121, 122 & 123
- Original air dates: May 18, 2005 (Part 1); May 25, 2005 (Part 2)
- Running time: 127 minutes

Guest appearances
- Michelle Rodriguez as Ana Lucia Cortez; Fredric Lehne as Marshal Mars; Mira Furlan as Danielle Rousseau; Daniel Roebuck as Dr. Leslie Arzt; M. C. Gainey as Other; Chard Hayward as Duncan; John Walcutt as Hawaiian shirt; Kevin E. West as Detective Calderwood; Wendy Braun as Gina; Robert Frederick as Jeff; Christian Bowman as Steve Jenkins; Terasa Livingstone as Lily; Michelle Arthur as Michelle; Glenn Cannon as Old man; Mark "Ruz" Rusden as Airport cop; John Dixon as JD; Suzanne Turner as Ticket agent; Mark "Kiwi" Kalagher as Security agent; Mary Ann Taheny as Jenna; George Alan as Flight attendant

Episode chronology
← Previous "Born to Run"	Next → "Man of Science, Man of Faith"
- Lost season 1

"Exodus: Part 1" and "Exodus: Part 2" are collectively the first season finale of the American drama television series Lost, consisting of the 23rd episode and a double 24th and 25th episodes of the first season and the show overall. The episodes were directed by Jack Bender, and written by Damon Lindelof and Carlton Cuse. In the United States, "Part 1" first aired on May 18, 2005, and "Part 2" on May 25, 2005, as a double-length season finale on ABC. In several countries, like the United Kingdom, Italy, Australia and Portugal, the double-length "Part 2" was split in half, resulting in the last episode being called "Exodus: Part 3".

In these episodes, Danielle Rousseau (Mira Furlan) leads Jack Shephard (Matthew Fox), Kate Austen (Evangeline Lilly), John Locke (Terry O'Quinn) and Hugo "Hurley" Reyes (Jorge Garcia) to the mysterious Black Rock to get dynamite for them to blow open the hatch door, as the threat of the Others looms near. Meanwhile, Michael Dawson (Harold Perrineau), his son Walt Lloyd (Malcolm David Kelley), James "Sawyer" Ford (Josh Holloway) and Jin-Soo Kwon (Daniel Dae Kim) set sail on the raft they built in hopes of finding rescue.

== Plot ==
=== Part 1 ===
==== Flashbacks ====
Several of the survivors are shown in the final hours before the flight. Early that morning, Walt Lloyd (Malcolm David Kelley) wakes up and turns on the TV. When an awakened Michael Dawson (Harold Perrineau) asks him to turn it off, Walt throws a tantrum and flees the room with his dog Vincent. In the airport lounge, Jack Shephard (Matthew Fox) converses with another passenger on his flight, Ana Lucia Cortez (Michelle Rodriguez). James "Sawyer" Ford (Josh Holloway) is told that he is being placed on Flight 815 because he is being deported by the Australian government after assaulting a government minister in a bar fight. Kate Austen (Evangeline Lilly) is handcuffed to the Marshal (Fredric Lane). During a conversation with the customs officer, the Marshal reveals that he had baited Kate with Tom Brennan's toy airplane. When he denigrates Tom's memory, Kate attacks him, but is subdued. At the check-in, Shannon Rutherford (Maggie Grace) waits for Boone Carlyle (Ian Somerhalder) to get them a first-class upgrade, when Sayid Jarrah (Naveen Andrews) asks her to watch his bag. She disinterestedly agrees, but when Boone returns without an upgrade, she carelessly leaves the bag. As Boone chastises her, she walks up to a police officer, telling them that "an Arab guy" left his bag unattended. Sun-Hwa Kwon (Yunjin Kim) and Jin-Soo Kwon (Daniel Dae Kim) are eating in the airport cafe. Sun overhears comments from an American couple regarding her apparent submissiveness to Jin and is forced to pretend that she does not understand their conversation.

==== On the Island ====
Early in the morning, Danielle Rousseau (Mira Furlan) arrives at the beach to warn the survivors that The Others are coming, and tells them more of her own story. She was pregnant when she came to the island sixteen years ago but the Others—their arrival heralded by a column of black smoke—came and kidnapped her baby, whom she has not seen since.

As the group resumes work on the raft, Walt notices a column of black smoke in the distance. The survivors then tell Rousseau about the hatch, and their need to open it. Rousseau offers to take them to the "Black Rock", where she says they can find dynamite.

Jack runs into Sawyer in the jungle, and hands him a pistol with ammo "just in case". They share an awkward, distant goodbye. As Jack leaves, Sawyer stops him and tells him of when he met a man named Christian (John Terry) (Jack's father) in a bar in Sydney. He tells Jack what Christian said about his son, and Jack is visibly moved. Jack moves off into the jungle to find explosives.

As Jack, Kate, John Locke (Terry O'Quinn), Hugo "Hurley" Reyes (Jorge Garcia) and Dr. Leslie Arzt (Daniel Roebuck) head toward the Black Rock, Arzt is chased by The Monster, which Rousseau says is a security system protecting the island.

As the raft prepares for launch, Sayid gives the team a radar emitter and flare gun, while Charlie Pace (Dominic Monaghan) gathers messages from the remaining castaways to put in a bottle, and Walt leaves Vincent with Shannon, telling her Vincent was a good listener when his mother died and she can talk to him about Boone. Shannon is visibly moved, and said she will keep Vincent until they come back with rescuers. Sun says goodbye to Jin, handing him a notebook of phonetically written English terms to help him communicate with the others. This encourages him to speak to her and they reconcile. He says that he will still go, but because he wants to rescue her from the island. After all the goodbyes, the raft team sets off, while in the distance, the column of smoke continues to rise.

=== Part 2 ===
==== Flashbacks ====
Following Sun's flashback from the previous episode, Jin goes to the bathroom, he encounters a Caucasian man (John Walcutt) who reveals, in Korean, that he works for Sun's father, and knows that Jin was attempting to run away with Sun. He tells Jin to complete his delivery of a watch to Sun's father's friend in California and says he will never be free. In his hotel room, Charlie attempts to find his drugs. A girl (Terasa Livingstone), whom he has obviously slept with, asks if he has any left. He lies and says that he's run out, but she realizes that he's lying and attacks him for the drugs.

Michael and Walt wait in the airport for their flight. Michael calls his mother and asks if she can take care of Walt, eventually even offering to pay her. Walt appears to overhear part of the conversation while asking Michael for batteries for his video game.

Hurley awakens late for his flight due to a short-circuit in the wall outlet that leaves his alarm clock without power. In a mad dash for the airport, he experiences several problems, including a flat tire and arriving at the domestic terminal rather than international; he manages to get to the terminal just as they are closing the gate. The boarding agent is able to get them to reopen the doors for him, and he hugs her. Airline staff tell Locke that the wheelchair that is normally used to load disabled passengers on to the plane is missing, and he must be carried on by two attendants. When he drops a pamphlet from his seat, he is unable to reach it, but struggles to maintain his dignity.

The final flashback is a montage that shows the group of strangers boarding the plane. Claire struggles in the aisle to get to her seat. Kate is led in handcuffs onto the plane. Sawyer searches for his seat as Charlie stores away his guitar. Jack puts his luggage into the overhead compartment, with Locke watching right behind him. Sun sits quietly with Jin, who is staring at the watch. Sayid endures the subtle racism of a fellow passenger sitting near him by looking at pictures of his lost love (Andrea Gabriel). Michael fastens the seatbelt of Walt as he plays Game Boy Advance SP, ignoring his father. Shannon frantically searches for her inhaler in her purse, but Boone gives it to her, causing her to smile. Hurley makes it on to the plane, giving Walt a thumbs-up before sitting down. Arzt helps Claire put her bag in the overhead compartment. Finally, Jack, about to sit down, catches Locke's eye, and the two politely acknowledge each other, unaware of what awaits them.

==== On the island ====
The Black Rock is revealed to be the hull of a Portsmouth-registered wooden sailing ship, marooned in the jungle. After Rousseau leaves them, Locke, Kate, and Jack enter the ship through a large hole in the hull. Skeletons are found shackled together, likely the remains of slaves. Old mining equipment is also found, including at least two cases of highly-volatile dynamite sticks. Jack and Locke haul one of the cases out of the ship. While attempting to handle some of the dynamite carefully, Arzt accidentally triggers one of the sticks upon waving it around, blowing himself up. The remaining survivors decide to continue, wrap the dynamite in wet cloth, and try to carry it back to the hatch.

On their way, Jack and Kate see what seems to be a small cloud of smoke move through some nearby trees, and they hear the rumbling of The Monster, which ensnares Locke's leg and drags him through the jungle. Jack grabs onto Locke to prevent him from being pulled into a hole, though Locke pleads with Jack to let him go. Jack then instructs Kate to drop a stick of dynamite into the tunnel, which causes an underground explosion, resulting in black smoke coming out of a nearby hole on the horizon, and disappearing. The hold on Locke slackens and they are able to extract him. Jack and Locke discuss the situation, and Locke says that Jack is a man of science, but that he is a man of faith. Locke believes everything that has occurred, including the death of Boone, was predestined, leading them all to the opening of the hatch. Jack disagrees, and believes that opening the hatch is a simple matter of survival.

Charlie and Claire are alone on the beach when Rousseau runs up, telling Charlie that she needs to see Sayid urgently. When Charlie runs off to get Sayid, Rousseau asks Claire if she can hold her baby. Soon Charlie and Sayid (accompanied by Shannon) return, to find Claire with a head wound exclaiming that her baby has been taken, and Sayid surmises that Rousseau intends to attempt an exchange of Aaron, Claire's baby, for her own child, Alex, with the "Others." As evening approaches, Charlie and Sayid head toward the black smoke. During their journey, Charlie is injured by one of Rousseau's traps, and they also encounter the downed drug smugglers' plane, which Sayid, unaware of Charlie's past as an addict, reveals is full of heroin - Charlie appears conflicted as he stares at them. When Sayid and Charlie arrive on the beach with the black smoke, there are no other footprints or people, just a pyre on the sand, though they discover both the baby and Rousseau nearby. Charlie angrily accuses her of lighting the pyre herself and inventing "the Others" as cover for kidnapping the baby. She tearfully tells them that she overheard them saying that they were going to go after "the boy", and she thought that if she brought him to them, they would return her child. She returns the baby.

Meanwhile, Jack, Kate, Locke and Hurley arrive at the hatch. They manage to set the dynamite up on the hinge of the hatch, and are about to set it off when Hurley notices the appearance of the numbers on the side. He yells at them not to light the fuse, but Locke does so anyway. Hurley unsuccessfully tries to stamp it out, though Jack is able to tackle him out of the way just in time to save him from the blast.

At night, the raft crew's radar sweep turns up a boat in the distance. They fire their single flare, and the boat approaches them. It turns out to be a group of strangers in a small launch, who demand that they hand over Walt. Sawyer tries to pull his gun, but he is shot by one of the boat crewmen and falls into the water. Jin jumps into the water to try and save Sawyer, while the strangers overpower Michael, throwing him in the water, and kidnap Walt. As they sail off, the strangers throw an explosive on to the raft, destroying it. (This scene makes it clear that when Rousseau heard "the Others" say they were "coming for the boy", they were actually coming for Walt - and not Claire's baby, Aaron, as Rousseau misinterpreted them as meaning.)

Charlie reunites the baby with Claire. It is also revealed that Charlie has kept at least one of the statues filled with heroin in his bag. Shannon finds Sayid and they embrace.

The episode ends with Jack and Locke looking down into the hatch, which the explosion successfully blew off the cover of. The camera descends down the hatch; which is an extremely dark and narrow hole with a broken ladder near the top.

== Production ==
This is the first appearance of Ana Lucia Cortez (portrayed by Michelle Rodriguez) who would go on to become a series regular in the second season. This episode also marks the first appearance of Tom (M. C. Gainey), a recurring character in the following seasons.

The episodes were written by executive producers Damon Lindelof and Carlton Cuse, making it the second and third episodes they have written together.

While Hurley rushes through the airport the numbers 4, 8, 15, 16, 23 and 42 are seen on the backs of a school sports team's jerseys.

== Reception ==
18.62 million American viewers watched "Part 1" live. 20.71 million American viewers tuned in to "Part 2," making this the most watched episode in the US since the thirteenth episode, "Hearts and Minds."

Chris Carabott from IGN "loved" Tom's first appearance because "It's a great scene and our first introduction to The Others besides Ethan's infiltration of the camp." Gainey found the fan reaction to his first appearance "really tough", because "everywhere [he] went people would just give [him] dirty looks and they were like 'What are you going to do with that boy?'", but he noted this gradually improved after his appearances in season two. In another IGN article, Eric Goldman ranked "Exodus, Part 1" as 52nd out of all the episodes of Lost, while he ranked "Exodus, Part 2" higher in the 19th spot, praising the tension wrought in both parts. Erin Martell from AOL's TV Squad listed Tom in her five "most entertaining guest roles" from the first three seasons, commenting "I am counting his first episode as my favorite. For my money, there was nothing more disturbing than when Gainey showed up out of the blue and uttered the words, 'We're gonna have to take the boy.' I could not get that scene out of my head for days after 'Exodus' aired."
