= LA X =

- Lost episodes
- Jack Shephard (Matthew Fox), on Oceanic Flight 815 in what appears to be an alternate timeline
- Episode nos.: Season 6 Episodes 1 & 2
- Directed by: Jack Bender
- Written by: Damon Lindelof; Carlton Cuse
- Production codes: 601 & 602
- Original air date: February 2, 2010
- Running time: 83 minutes

Guest appearances
- Mark Pellegrino as Jacob; Elizabeth Mitchell as Juliet Burke; Hiroyuki Sanada as Dogen; Ian Somerhalder as Boone Carlyle; Dominic Monaghan as Charlie Pace; L. Scott Caldwell as Rose Nadler; Sam Anderson as Bernard Nadler; Daniel Roebuck as Dr. Leslie Arzt; John Hawkes as Lennon; Kimberley Joseph as Cindy Chandler; Greg Grunberg as Seth Norris; Brad William Henke as Bram; Fredric Lehne as Marshal Edward Mars; Sean Whalen as Neil "Frogurt"; Mickey Graue as Zack; Kiersten Havelock as Emma; David Coennen as Agent Smalley; Shawn Lathrop as Flight attendant; Percival Scott III as Security officer; Troy Vincent as Oceanic rep; Mark Ashing as Customs officer; Kesha Diodato as Agent Anne; Kelly Kraynek as Woman; David H. Lawrence XVII as Taxi driver

Episode chronology
← Previous "The Incident"	Next → "What Kate Does"
- Lost season 6

"LA X" comprises the 104th and 105th episodes of the American Broadcasting Company's Lost, marking the premiere of the sixth and final season. It was written by show runners/executive producers Damon Lindelof and Carlton Cuse and directed by executive producer Jack Bender. Both parts were aired on February 2, 2010, on ABC in the United States and CTV in Canada, and on February 4, 2010, on RTÉ Two in Ireland.

The story deals with the aftermath of the detonation of the hydrogen bomb at the end of the previous episode, "The Incident". "LA X" introduces a new narrative device, two separate timelines, that replaces previously used devices, such as flashbacks, flash-forwards and time travel. Cuse and Lindelof have stated that the "two distinct timelines" are "equally real". Both ABC and the producers refer to these scenes as "flash sideways".

The date of first broadcast was the source of much speculation, as ABC intentionally avoided locking down a timeslot to keep options open in order to assess the threat of the upcoming Olympic Games and to better fit Lost with how other shows were performing on ABC's schedule. Scheduling was further placed in jeopardy when it was announced that the chosen night was being considered for the 2010 State of the Union Address. The season premiere was the first episode of Lost to air on a Tuesday in the United States.

Despite the fact that there is no specific character on which the premiere is centered, Hugo "Hurley" Reyes, Jack Shephard, Kate Austen, John Locke, Sun-Hwa Kwon, Sayid Jarrah, Jin-Soo Kwon and James "Sawyer" Ford each have points of view in the premiere.

== Plot ==
After Jughead's detonation, two scenarios are shown: one in which Oceanic 815 never crashes, and one in which the timeline has not been altered at all.

=== 2004 (flash-sideways timeline) ===
The first timeline begins on Oceanic Flight 815, in which the survivors' attempt to change the future has apparently averted the crash. The island is now shown to be at the bottom of the ocean. Kate Austen (Evangeline Lilly) is still being transported in custody of U.S. Marshal Edward Mars (Fredric Lehne); Dr. Jack Shephard (Matthew Fox) is transporting his deceased father; and John Locke (Terry O'Quinn) is still paralyzed. Boone Carlyle (Ian Somerhalder) is returning to Los Angeles without his stepsister; Hugo "Hurley" Reyes (Jorge Garcia) claims to be the luckiest man alive; Locke claims to have participated in his walkabout; Desmond Hume (Henry Ian Cusick) is a passenger and Rose Henderson (L. Scott Caldwell) reassures Jack while experiencing turbulence. During the flight, Jack is called upon to save Charlie Pace (Dominic Monaghan), who has asphyxiated while attempting to swallow a packet of heroin. Jack, aided by Sayid Jarrah (Naveen Andrews), resuscitates him. Jack earlier encountered Desmond; however, he is nowhere to be seen when the plane lands.

At LAX, Charlie is arrested for drug possession, and Jack learns that the airline has lost his father's coffin. Kate escapes Mars' custody. Jin-Soo Kwon (Daniel Dae Kim) is detained after failing to declare a large amount of cash on his customs form. His travel partner, Sun-Hwa Paik (Yunjin Kim), who claims she cannot speak English, does nothing to help the situation. Kate hijacks a taxicab in which Claire Littleton (Emilie de Ravin) is also a passenger. Jack speaks with Locke, who notes that his own luggage has also been misplaced. They discuss Locke's condition, which he says is irreversible. Jack responds that nothing is irreversible, reveals that he is a spinal surgeon, and offers Locke a free medical consultation.

=== 2007 (original timeline) ===
In the second timeline, the events directly follow those of "The Incident." Jack, Kate, Hurley, Sayid, Jin, Juliet Burke (Elizabeth Mitchell), James "Sawyer" Ford (Josh Holloway), and Miles Straume (Ken Leung) have been returned to the present at the site of the Dharma Initiative Swan station, after Ben Linus (Michael Emerson) has killed Jacob (Mark Pellegrino). Sawyer is angered by the prospect that Juliet's death was meaningless and engages in a fight with Jack. However, Juliet is alive underneath the remains of the station. The survivors free Juliet, who dies moments before she can tell Sawyer something important; Sawyer blames Jack.

Hurley tends to Sayid, who has been mortally wounded by a gunshot. Jacob appears to Hurley. Jacob explains that he has been killed and that Sayid must be taken to the Others' temple in order to be healed. Hurley must also bring the guitar case that Jacob gave him. Sawyer and Miles stay behind to bury Juliet while the rest go to the temple. Sawyer forces Miles to use his medium skills to talk to Juliet. Miles relays her message: "It worked", which leaves Sawyer confused.

At the temple, the group encounters the remaining members of the Others who have taken refuge, including Flight 815 stewardess Cindy (Kimberley Joseph) and the two abducted children, Zack and Emma, who have been missing since they were taken in by the Others. The survivors are captured and brought before two men, the Japanese man Dogen (Hiroyuki Sanada) and his translator Lennon (John Hawkes). Hurley says that Jacob sent him, and offers the guitar case as proof. Inside is a wooden ankh, which Dogen breaks open, revealing a note that tells the Others they will all be in trouble if Sayid dies. Sayid is brought to a spring, noted to have gone murky, and is held underwater until the time of an hourglass passes. Jack administers CPR, but Sayid does not respond. They believe Sayid has died. Sawyer and Miles are brought into the temple, having been captured after burying Juliet. Dogen privately questions Hurley, who reveals Jacob is dead. Shocked, the Others sound an alarm, prepare their defenses, and send fireworks into the air in preparation for an attack. Lennon insists on speaking with Jack privately. Jack refuses, leading to an altercation, when Sayid comes back to life.

Inside the pedestal of the statue, the Man in Black, who has taken the form of Locke, orders Ben to bring Richard Alpert (Nestor Carbonell) inside. Once Ben delivers this news, Richard refuses and shows Locke's body to Ben. Bram (Brad William Henke) and his team from Flight 316 enter the statue with Ben. The Man in Black transforms into the smoke monster. He kills Bram and his men, but spares Ben. Returning to Locke's body, the Man in Black then reveals what Locke's thoughts were as Ben strangled him to death; Locke did not understand why Ben killed him. Locke was also the only one among the initial survivors who wanted to stay and live on the island. The Man in Black's goal, on the other hand, is to return home. Outside, Richard sees the fireworks from the temple. The Man in Black confronts Richard, who realizes who the man is. The Man in Black knocks him out and, while carrying Richard into the jungle, announces his disappointment in the Others.

== Production ==
=== Casting ===
Dominic Monaghan appears as Charlie after a 30-episode absence. Ian Somerhalder also reprises his role as Boone for the first time since the episode "Exposé", while Kimberley Joseph appears as flight attendant Cindy Chandler for the first time since the episode "The Brig", both from the third season. Greg Grunberg recorded lines in Los Angeles for a voice-over reprisal of his role of Oceanic Airlines Captain Seth Norris of Flight 815 that crashed on the island in the pilot episode. Originally, Maggie Grace was set to make an appearance as Shannon, but Grace was unable to film any scenes due to her busy schedule. Thus, the backstory was rewritten to accommodate this.

=== Writing ===
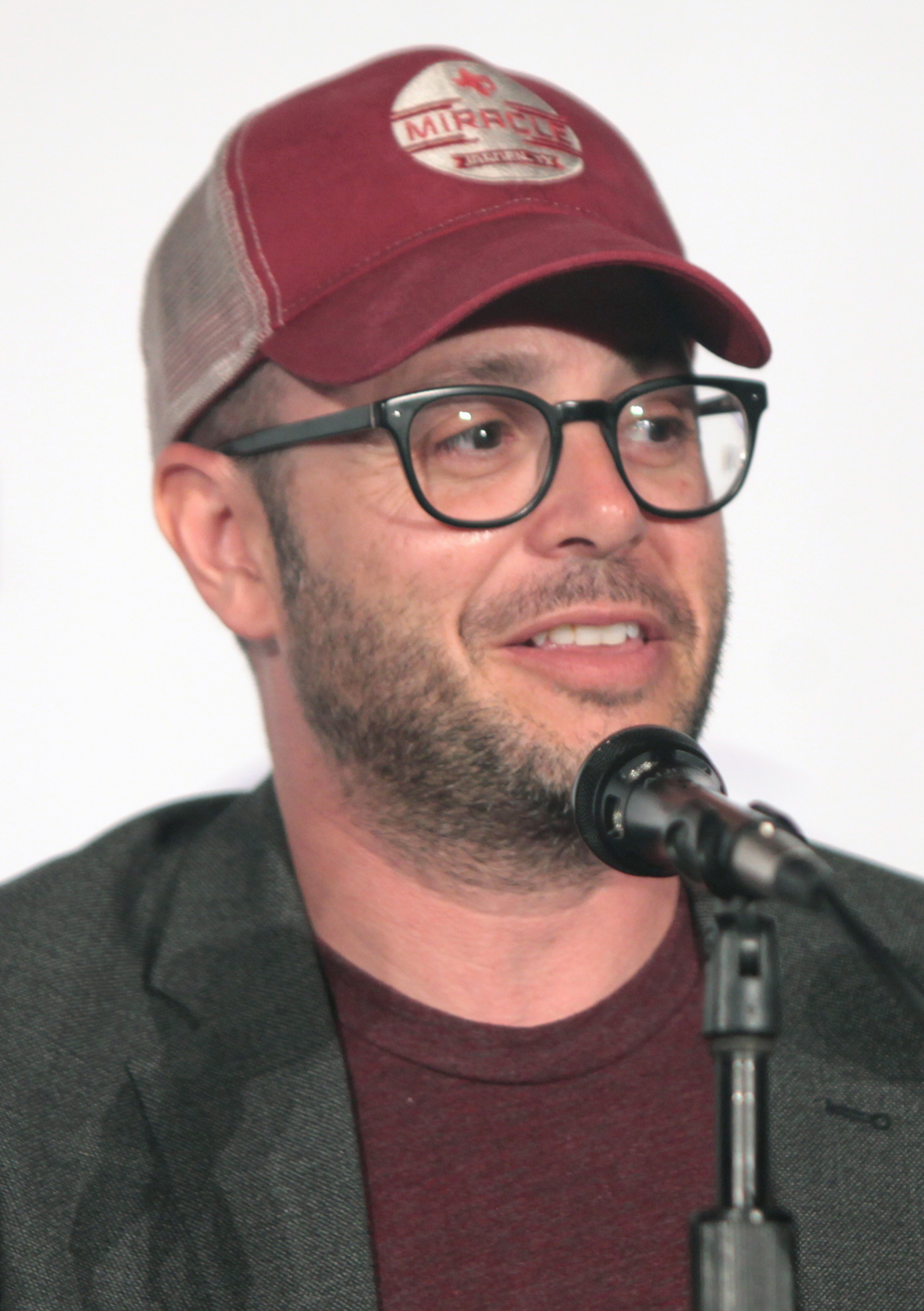
Co-writer Damon Lindelof has said that the final season mirrors the first.

In terms of genre elements, Damon Lindelof has stated that, "We sort of suckered people into this show [by] not presenting it as a science fiction show right out of the gate … Lost has really been about the long con, because by the time we get to season 6, it's going to be...crazy!" The premiere will introduce a new narrative technique to the show, following flashbacks in the first five seasons, flashforwards in the third and fourth seasons and time travel in the fifth season. According to Lindelof, who is apprehensive that the audience will not understand or reject it, "the show demands constant shifts to best tell the story. We've known what we were going to do for a couple years now and there's been a tremendous amount of work setting up the premise so it would work." Lindelof has commented that the sixth season will most resemble the first for the show, even including characters sparsely seen since, saying, "We want the show to feel like a loop is closing with this final year", to which Carlton Cuse added that when the characters in the first season "were running around the jungle, things felt intense and surprising. We have a way that we're going to be able to do that in the final season too." Cuse has also stated, "We feel tonally it's most similar to the first season of the show. [The new] narrative device … is creating some emotional and heartfelt stories, and we want the audience to have a chance in the final season to remember the entire history of the show … We're hoping to achieve a circularity of the entire journey so the ending is reminiscent of the beginning." Cuse further explained that the new narrative "doesn't require either a deep investment or in-depth knowledge about the series", keeping in line with ABC Entertainment president Stephen McPherson's conclusion that "you really don't have to have seen the show [to watch the season]. There will be stuff that will go completely over your head for sure, but because of the way that they're telling this last season, it is this beautiful standalone conclusion." For years, Lindelof and Cuse have responded to theories about the greater meaning and answers of the show by pointing out that viewers did not have adequate information to theorize well. Lindelof finally conceded that "by the end of the season premiere of season six, you will have pretty much all the fundamental building blocks you need to put together a...theory as to what it all means and where the show [will] end." Confronted that the bomb detonating would force a timeline change and thus render the past five seasons pointless, Damon Lindelof responded with "Trust us." While producing the fourth season, Lindelof said, "We want people to believe in the stakes of the show. The problem with alternative realities is that you never know when the rug is going to be pulled out from under you. We want the audience to believe that the jeopardy is real. Postulating alternative realities would be an escape valve that would be damaging that as a narrative value … Carlton and I are PRO time-space continuum bending! But we're ANTI-paradox. Paradox creates issues." Actor Terry O'Quinn has divulged that "it is revealed who Locke actually is. Although that's still kind of a mystery of who is that. But there's still a pretty big revelation there."

=== Scheduling ===
As the third season was wrapping production in May 2007, Damon Lindelof and Carlton Cuse negotiated with ABC for the show to end in three years. The remaining three seasons were to each be a third shorter, containing just sixteen episodes each that would air consecutively week after week from early February through mid-May. The fourth season premiered on the last day of January in 2008, but was soon interrupted and truncated by the 2007–2008 Writers Guild of America strike, adding an episode apiece onto the remaining seasons. Then-co-executive producer Edward Kitsis speculated that these would translate into more two-part episodes. The fifth season premiered two weeks early to allow for two breaks in the season for a rerun and a clip-show respectively. In June 2009, the producers ordered an additional hour for the show's final season. Cuse explained that "For us, [eighteen hours] is just about right. I mean, we aren't sitting here feeling like, 'Oh my God, we need a ton more hours to tell the rest of our story.' It feels like it's going to work out just fine. It will have been the right length." In September, ABC Entertainment president Stephen McPherson advertised that the final season would be the first Lost season to run uninterrupted and entirely repeat-free; however, Cuse said in October that Lost would premiere in January in order to take a two-week break in February to avoid competing with NBC's coverage of the Vancouver Winter Olympic Games. Having been shuffled around the primetime schedule five times (airing Wednesday at 8:00 in the first season, Wednesdays at 9:00 for the second and fifth seasons and part of the third season, Wednesdays at 10:00 for part of the third season and on Thursdays at both 9:00 and 10:00 for different parts of the fourth season) and remaining a top twenty program in Nielsen ratings, McPherson had defined Lost as a "wildcard asset", elaborating that "it's a great position to be in. We're going to see where we are coming into the spring and see what happens. It's a tool to use." With ABC's new Wednesday sitcom block performing well, ABC ultimately ruled in November that Lost would move to Tuesdays at 9:00/8 central for the first time, premiering in February and running straight through with original episode broadcasts into mid-May, not taking a break for the Olympic Games.

On January 6, 2010, it was reported that the White House was considering two dates for Barack Obama's annual State of the Union address, which is typically on the last Tuesday of January at 9:00: January 26 and February 2. Were the latter date selected, the Lost premiere would be preempted and have to air at a later date, sabotaging months of promotion by ABC for "The Final Season" and forcing some awkward rescheduling of the season, which had no leeway for interruptions. This prompted an online protest among fans and the story was picked up by dozens of media outlets. On January 8, White House press secretary Robert Gibbs announced "I don't foresee a scenario in which millions of people who hope to finally get some conclusion with Lost are preempted by the president", to which Damon Lindelof responded via his Twitter account with "OBAMA BACKED DOWN!!!! Groundhog Day is OURS!!!!!!! (God Bless America)". Ben East of the United Arab Emirates The National newspaper summed up the story with "confirmation of just how important [Lost] is came with an almost unbelievable communiqué from the White House last week … That's right. Obama might have had vital information to impart upon the American people about health care, the war in Afghanistan, the financial crisis—things that, you know, might affect real lives. But the most important thing was that his address didn't clash with a series in which a polar bear appears on a tropical island. After extensive lobbying by the ABC network, the White House surrendered." Lindelof later recounted, "What's amazing is you realize how fickle your political affiliations are. I'm a lifelong Democrat, but when I first heard that they were considering February 2, I was like, 'That motherfucker!' ""

== Reception ==
=== Critical response ===
The episode received critical acclaim. Critical review aggregate website Metacritic assigned "LA X" a score of 89/100, indicating "universal acclaim" and making it the best-reviewed season premiere of the 2009-2010 television season. Chris Carbot of IGN gave the episode a strong positive review, stating that "season six is off to a fantastic start", although he criticized the first hour of the premiere for its pacing and lack of "information that needs to be imparted to the audience." Overall he gave the episode a score of 9.2. Noel Murray of The A.V. Club also praised "LA X", stating that he "loved pretty much every minute", and grading it A. Variety's Cynthia Littleton praised the premiere as well, calling it "worth the ten-month wait." Maureen Ryan of Chicago Tribune gave the episode a perfect score, stating "This was a fantastic season premiere. I was on the edge of my seat as all the revelations and heartbreaks and the dual timelines unfolded". Alan Sepinwall of the Star-Ledger reviewed the episode positively as well, calling it "fun" and comparing it to the pilot episode.

Ben Rawson-Jones of Digital Spy gave the episode four out of five stars, explaining that "the skilful hands who craft that show assembled everything so intricately that we were treated to a thoroughly compelling adventure … On this evidence, Lost will go out on a high". He particularly enjoyed the "breathtaking camera swoop" from Oceanic 815 to the submerged island, saying that it "showcased [a] cinematic, visceral texture". Rawson-Jones commended Terry O'Quinn's dual-role performance, but lamented the treatment of Juliet's death, assessing it as melodramatic and predictable and calling it "the only real sore point of the generally brilliant season premiere."

=== Ratings ===
The episode was watched by 12.1 million American viewers, 1.70 million Canadian viewers, 1.406 million viewers in the United Kingdom,
