= Walt Lloyd =

Fictional character of the TV series Lost

- Lost character
- Malcolm David Kelley as Walt Lloyd
- First appearance: "Pilot (Part 1)"
- Last appearance: "The New Man in Charge"
- Created by: Jeffrey Lieber; J. J. Abrams; Damon Lindelof
- Portrayed by: Malcolm David Kelley
- Centric episode(s): "Special"

In-universe information
- Full name: Walter Lloyd
- Alias: Keith Johnson
- Species: Human
- Gender: Male
- Relatives: Michael Dawson (father)
- Nationality: American
- Former residence: Sydney, Australia

Walter "Walt" Lloyd is a fictional character portrayed by Malcolm David Kelley in the American ABC television series Lost. The series follows the lives of over forty survivors of the crash of Oceanic Flight 815. Walt is introduced in the pilot episode as one of the survivors aboard the plane, which crashes onto the island where most of the program takes place. He is the 10-year-old son of Michael Dawson (played by Harold Perrineau).

Walt appears in thirty episodes of Lost; 27 in seasons one and two as a series regular, and three more episodes as a guest star. He also features in the Lost epilogue "The New Man in Charge". Throughout the series, he is the only child main character. Initially, Walt and Michael have a dysfunctional father-son relationship, causing Walt to form friendships with other survivors, such as Locke and Sun. Walt leaves the island on a raft with Michael and two other survivors during the episode "Exodus", but is kidnapped by a group of hostile island inhabitants known as the Others. Walt is then released by the Others in the episode "Live Together, Die Alone", who claim that he was "more than [they] could handle", and he and Michael leave the island at the end of season two.

After auditioning many children for the part, Kelley was hired by the program's producers, who had been impressed by his performance in the 2002 film Antwone Fisher. When being developed, Lost's creators intended for Walt to display supernatural powers, such as the ability to summon animals through telepathy, but when Kelley had aged significantly for him to no longer convincingly look ten years old, the character's arc was changed and Walt was written out of the show.

== Arc ==
=== Before the crash ===
Walt as a baby with his father Michael

Walt is the 10-year-old son of Michael Dawson, a construction worker and part-time artist. He was born August 24, 1994, and is named after Michael's father, Walter. His mother is Susan Lloyd, a law student, who refused to marry Michael.

When offered a job in Amsterdam, Susan persuades Michael to let her take Walt with her while he is still a baby. Two weeks before Walt's second birthday, Susan tells Michael that she and her boss, Brian Porter, are planning to get married and will be moving to Rome, Italy, at the end of the month. A legal battle ensues between Walt's parents. Several months later, they settle their dispute amicably and Michael lets Susan keep Walt with her.

Eight years later, Susan dies in Australia due to a "blood disorder". Brian pleads with Michael to take custody of the boy and even gives him tickets for the flight to Sydney and back, plus money for travel expenses. Brian reveals that he had never wanted to adopt Walt and that he is scared of him. When Michael arrives in Australia to collect Walt, he does not take too well to him. Michael spares Walt's feelings by telling him that Brian wants to keep him, but that it is up to Michael and he has decided to take him.

=== After the crash ===
Soon after the crash, Walt is left under the care of different people due to Michael's involvement in helping other survivors—in particular, Walt spends time with John Locke. He is intrigued by Locke's hunting instincts, and constantly tries to sneak away with him, always unsuccessfully. He sneaks away with Locke and Boone, and exhibits a natural talent in knife throwing. Michael soon arrives and is enraged, taking Walt away from them and forbidding him to see Locke again. Walt takes Vincent, the dog, and leaves camp, heading into the jungle, where he encounters a polar bear. He is rescued by Michael and Locke.

Michael begins constructing a raft to leave the island, and finishes it after a few days. Walt secretly sets alight to it, completely destroying it. Later, Walt confesses to burning the original raft, explaining that he did not want to leave the island, but decides they need to leave. The next morning, Walt gives Vincent to Shannon before he leaves on the raft with Michael, Jin and Sawyer. That night, however, they encounter the Others, who kidnap Walt. Walt remains in captivity with the Others, but frequently appears to Shannon. In the mobisode "Room 23" it is revealed Walt posed a greater threat to the Others than they had expected, as he had been doing something unspecified that frightened them so that they would not go in to see him. Ben responds to a particular situation with a blaring alarm and people in commotion, and Juliet suggests that Ben take responsibility of the situation and bring Walt back to Michael.

As Michael is inspecting the technical equipment inside the hatch, he unexpectedly receives a message that he believes is from Walt. Michael is briefly reunited with Walt after he is brought to the Others' camp. Later, Michael returns with Jack, Kate, Sawyer and Hurley, in an exchange for Walt and their freedom. Walt waits in a boat, and he and Michael sail off.

=== After the island ===
While off the island, Walt learns that Michael killed Ana-Lucia and Libby and decided to live at his grandmother's house so as not to speak or have anything to do with his father.

In "The Life and Death of Jeremy Bentham", Walt is shown to be living in New York City. He is visited by Locke, using a wheelchair at that point, having returned from the Island. Locke does not ask Walt to return to the Island as he does with the rest of the Oceanic returnees, as he felt that the boy had been through enough already. In "There's No Place Like Home", after being visited by Locke, Walt visits Hurley at the Santa Rosa Mental Institution with his grandmother. He asks Hurley why the Oceanic Six are lying and is told that they're lying to protect the people left behind on the island. Walt is under the assumption that his father is still alive and living on the island. In "The End", Lost's final episode, neither Walt nor Michael feature among the main characters moving on to the afterlife. However, in the 12-minute epilogue to the series, "The New Man in Charge" (included on the DVD box set), Ben and Hurley visit Walt in the mental hospital that Hurley had previously been in. Ben promises Walt he can "help his father," even though they both know Michael is dead. Hurley and Ben take Walt "home" to the Island, where Hurley promises him he will have a "job".

== Development ==
Many children were seen for the role of Walt. They were narrowed down to a top three, with Malcolm David Kelley winning the part after the producers were impressed with his role in the 2002 film Antwone Fisher.

When Kelley was cast, the character of Walt was a 10-year-old boy, but, after two seasons, Kelley no longer looked 10. While the first four seasons move slowly through time and only months have passed on the show, the actual filming stretched over several years. The show's writers dealt with this by sending Michael and Walt away from the island at the end of the second season. In his brief appearance at the end of season three, Kelley is noticeably taller and older with a deeper voice. This fact is acknowledged by Locke in "Confirmed Dead". In the season four episode, "Meet Kevin Johnson", Kelley makes a brief uncredited cameo as Walt in the episode's flashbacks. Make-up and CGI were used to make Kelley look younger and more like a 10-year-old. In the season four finale, "There's No Place Like Home", Walt appears in a flash-forward, but this scene is set about three years after the plane crash, so Kelley's older appearance is not a problem. When asked about the production difficulties associated with Walt and possible appearances of the character in the fourth season, co-creator Damon Lindelof stated: "We've always known Malcolm was going to grow faster than we could shoot the show. And we planned for it. Trust us. Please trust us. You'll see [Walt] again. But you're gonna have to be patient. Sorry."

"We sort of have ideas. 'Gee, Walt's reading a comic book about polar bears, and a polar bear shows up.' Or, 'Walt is reading a book about birds, and a bird flies into the window.' I know what I mean by it, but I think when the audience starts getting disconnected is when you tell them what to think, which is: Walt is psychic."

— Executive producer Damon Lindelof on developing Walt

When the Lost producers were developing the character of Walt, they intended for him to display supernatural powers by summoning animals—in the episode "Special", it is suggested that Walt is able both to cause a bird to fly into a window and make a polar bear attack him through telepathy. This is also alluded to in "Live Together, Die Alone", when Ben describes Walt as being "more than [the Others] could handle". Kelley himself was also under the impression that his character possessed "magic powers", but after he had aged significantly enough for him to look no longer ten years old, the writers' plans were changed, and Walt was written out at the end of season two.

Walt returned to Lost in "The Life and Death of Jeremy Bentham", when Locke visits him in New York. Kelley had stated a willingness to return to the show again, which was realized in "The New Man in Charge".

== Reception ==
Walt's only centric episode was the season one episode, "Special", which received positive reviews from critics. Chris Carabott of IGN described the relationship "or lack thereof" between Walt and his father as "heart wrenching". Kirthana Ramisetti of Entertainment Weekly stated that it was "interesting" to discover that "Walt is 'different' and has special powers". She also named the scene of Walt and Michael reading letters towards the end of the episode as "one of [her favorites] of the entire season".

For his performance as Walt, Kelley won the award for Best Supporting Performance in a TV Series (Comedy or Drama) at the 2006 Young Artist Awards. He had been nominated for the Leading Performance award in the same category the previous year. He also co-won the 2005 Screen Actors Guild Award for "Best Ensemble – Drama Series.
