= Sun-Hwa Kwon =

Fictional character of the TV series Lost

Sun-hwa Kwon (Sun)
- Lost character
- Yunjin Kim as Sun
- First appearance: "Pilot (Part 1)"
- Last appearance: "The End"
- Created by: Jeffrey Lieber; J. J. Abrams; Damon Lindelof
- Portrayed by: Yunjin Kim; Sophie Kim (child)
- Centric episode(s): "House of the Rising Sun" "Exodus, Part 1" "...And Found" "The Whole Truth" "The Glass Ballerina" "D.O.C." "Ji Yeon" "There's No Place Like Home, Part, 1 & 3" "This Place is Death" "LA X, Parts 1 & 2" "The Package" "The Last Recruit" "The End"

In-universe information
- Full name: Sun-Hwa Kwon
- Species: Human
- Gender: Female
- Occupation: Heiress and housewife
- Spouse: Jin-Soo Kwon
- Children: Ji Yeon Kwon
- Relatives: Woo-Jung Paik (father)
- Nationality: South Korean
- Former residence: Seoul, South Korea

Korean name
- Hangul: 백선화
- RR: Baek Seonhwa
- MR: Paek Sŏnhwa

Sun-hwa Kwon, better known simply as "Sun", is a fictional character on the ABC television series Lost played by Yunjin Kim. Sun-hwa Kwon is the daughter of a powerful and incredibly wealthy Korean businessman and mobster.

== Character biography ==
=== Prior to the crash ===
Sun Paik was born on March 20, 1980, into the powerful Paik family; natives of Seoul. As a child, Sun was taught how to play the piano. On at least one occasion, she blamed the results of some mischief on a maid in order to avoid punishment. Later, Sun attended Seoul National University, majoring in Art History. When she returned without a husband, her mother arranged for her to meet a potential suitor, Jae Lee. The two hit it off until Jae Lee revealed that he planned on marrying an American woman. An upset Sun left him, only to quite literally bump into Jin-Soo Kwon (Daniel Dae Kim), her future husband. While Sun had doubts regarding her father's approval, she was surprised when Jin presented her with an engagement ring. They were wed in Korea, and at the reception, they were complimented by a Korean-speaking Jacob. Shortly after the wedding, however, Sun was approached by a woman claiming to be Jin's mother; she blackmailed Sun into paying her a large sum of money, with the threat of bringing shame upon the Paik family by revealing Jin to be the son of a fisherman and a prostitute. Sun asked her father for the money, but when she did not provide a reason, Mr. Paik assumed it was for Jin, and assigned him a new job until the debt was paid. Over time, Jin grew distant from Sun, and she planned on escaping her failing marriage. She began taking English lessons from Jae Lee, whose own plans had not worked out.

After many lessons; the relationship between Sun and Jae Lee developed into an affair. The two were eventually found in bed together by Mr. Paik and the affair ended. Sun and Jin had been trying to conceive a child, but after visiting a fertility doctor, they were informed that Sun was unable to conceive due to severe endometriosis, causing more strain on the marriage. Later, however, the doctor confided in Sun that it was Jin who was infertile, and that he was afraid to tell him because of his job as an enforcer. Later, Sun learned of Jae Lee's death and attended his funeral. She asked her father if he would tell Jin about her affair, to which he declined, saying that it was not his place. During preparations for a business trip, with Jin, to Sydney and Los Angeles; Sun spoke privately with a woman acting as an interior decorator. Sun had planned to leave Jin and her family and the woman had helped Sun set up a false identity (and a place for her to hide until the search for her ended). She was given instructions to leave Jin at the Sydney airport at 11:15 precisely; a car would be waiting outside the Oceanic Airlines gate and she was to maintain a low profile.

At the airport, Sun was prepared to follow her instructions, and heads towards the car outside. A single moment of tenderness from Jin, however, caused her to change her mind, and she decided to accompany him to Los Angeles. At the airport restaurant, she purchased food for the two of them. Sun accidentally spilled coffee on Jin and after he left to clean himself off; she listened to the snide remarks of a couple seated a few tables away. She and Jin then boarded the doomed flight.

=== After the crash ===
==== Season one ====
Following the crash, Jin is overly protective of Sun and tells her that they must isolate themselves from the other survivors. Whenever other survivors, particularly Michael, attempt to communicate with her, Sun is frowned upon by Jin. One morning, Jin is handcuffed to the wreckage after attacking Michael, and Sun attempts to indicate the watch that Michael is wearing. Sayid misinterprets this as a plea to remove the cuffs. Sun approaches Michael in the jungle and, to his surprise, explains about the watch in English, asking him to keep her bilingualism a secret. Prior to moving into the caves with Jin, Sun attempts to bury her fake I.D. when she is caught by Michael; the two share a brief tender moment before Sun flees. Later, Sun helps move the fallen rocks after Jack is caught in a cave in, and is almost volunteered to crawl through the narrow tunnel to save him by Jin. When Shannon suffers a near-fatal asthma attack, Sun asks Michael to gather some eucalyptus plants, in order for her to make an herbal remedy for her. Her assistance is scorned by Jin.

Sun creates a garden in the jungle, where she grows a variety of different herbs and fruit plants. She is helped by Kate, who then figures out that she speaks English. She begs Kate not to tell anyone else. Later, Sun attempts to bathe in the sea, but is quickly escorted away by Jin, prompting Michael to intervene. Sun slaps him for intervening, but apologizes to him later. Jin suspects something between the two and grows wary. That night, after the raft burns down, Sun discovers Jin in the caves with burn marks on his hands. She asks Jin if he caused the fire, to which he grows angry. When he is accused and beaten by Michael, Sun is forced to reveal her long-hidden bilingualism in front of Jin, and begs Michael to stop. Later, Jin leaves Sun, refusing to speak to her. When Boone is brought to the caves in critical condition, Sun helps Jack in the ensuing operation, retrieving a sea urchin in order for Jack to make a blood transfusion. Despite their efforts, Boone dies later that night.

Sun expresses her worry to Kate about Jin leaving her. Following her advice, Sun poisons Jin's drinking water, but ends up poisoning Michael instead. Only Kate and Jack know about this. Moments before departing, Sun writes Jin a phrasebook, containing English words written in Korean phonetics. This leads Jin to apologise to Sun for his behaviour. Jin believes he is on the island because he is being punished. Jin tells Sun that he is leaving because he is going to rescue her. The two reconcile before Jin departs on the raft.

==== Season two ====
Sun is approached by Claire and Shannon, who give her the message bottle taken on the raft. In a bid to keep it a secret, Sun buries it on the beach. She notices later that she has lost her wedding ring, and frantically searches for it, even tearing up her garden. She later finds it buried with the bottle. A few days later, Sun and Jin are reunited as the tail-section survivors of the plane migrate on the beach. When the two learn of Michael's sudden departure to look for Walt, Sun refuses to allow Jin to help, reminding him that she is his wife. She later tells Jin that she doesn't like being undermined by him, and the two vow to prevent it from occurring in the future. One day, while working in her garden, Sun is bagged and tied from behind; Sun manages to escape, but does not see who attempted to kidnap her. Sun passes out, and reawakens at the camp, remembering little of the traumatic experience.

Fearing for her safety, Jin disallows Sun to tend to her garden, going as far as ripping it apart. Sun returns to the beach, where she starts feeling light-headed. She asks Sawyer for a pregnancy test. Upon learning of her pregnancy, Sun is forced to tell Jin. She tells Jin that he is infertile, but swears that she has slept with no other; she had an affair with Jae Lee, but Jin never found out. Later, Sayid informs Sun of his plan to sail to the Others' camp using Desmond's boat, and asks her to ask Jin to sail for him. Sun does so, but demands that she come along too, knowing that Sayid will need someone to translate for him. As they sail to the Others' camp, they come across a statue of a four-toed foot. Sun and Jin remain on the boat while Sayid searches the Others' camp. Moments later, the three experience a deafening sound as the island is engulfed in a violet glow.

==== Season three ====
Sun is still on board the boat with Jin and Sayid, and eventually arrive at the pier. Sayid informs Sun of his plan to kidnap two of the Others, and asks her to lie to Jin. However, Jin reveals to Sun that he understands more English than she thinks. Sun hides in the boat that night while the other two wait outside. However, the Others head directly to the boat via sea, and Sun encounters Colleen. Startled by the boat's motor, Sun shoots Colleen, fatally injuring her. Sun manages to escape, narrowly avoiding Tom's gunfire. She makes it to shore, where she, Jin and Sayid return to the beach. Sun cares for Aaron one day while Claire goes for a swim, and is oblivious that she is drowning. Later, Sun attempts to help Jin speak English, by refusing to speak to him in Korean.

Later, she and Jin help Claire in catching a bird. When Desmond thwarts their plans, Sun encourages Claire to investigate. The next day, Sun is involved in the investigation of the apparent deaths of Nikki and Paulo. At first, she suspects food poisoning, but later blames the Others, referencing the time she was almost kidnapped. She learns that it was merely a staged act, planned by Sawyer. She threatens that the next grave dug will be his if Jin finds out, and slaps him. She also returns the diamonds he gave her, branding them as worthless on the island. Since then, Sun refuses to speak directly to Sawyer. After Juliet migrates to the camp, Sun demands to know about pregnancy on the island, and is shocked to learn that women die during pregnancy. Juliet takes Sun to the Staff station, where she uses the medical equipment to determine a date of conception; Sun learns that she conceived on the island, making Jin the father, but leaving Sun with less than two months to live before her second trimester.

Sun's trust in Juliet is broken when, during a camp meeting one night, Juliet's recorder is played, revealing a message informing Ben of Sun's pregnancy. She tells Jin that the baby is healthy, but never tells him about her fate. When Karl arrives to warn them of the Others' imminent arrival, Sun travels with the majority of the camp to the radio tower, while Jin stays behind. That night, she watches Jack's plan backfire, and grows concerned over the fate of her husband. Later, however, she and Rose are relieved to hear that their husbands are alive. She watches as Jack makes contact with Naomi's freighter.

==== Season four ====
Following Jack's success in contacting the freighter, Sun and Claire tend to Aaron shortly before heading back to the beach with the majority of the group. She is reunited with Jin at the crash site of the airplane cockpit. After learning of Charlie's death and Locke's plan to return to the barracks, Sun and Jin remain with Jack and return to the beach, awaiting apparent rescue. However Sun grows suspicious about the motives of their rescuers, and decides to leave with Jin. However, when Juliet finds out, in hopes of saving Sun's life, she reveals Sun's illness to Jin, and also tells him about her affair. Jin walks away from Sun, and Sun fears he is leaving her. Sun confronts Juliet, who reminds her that she has to get off the island in three weeks, or else she is dead. Jin later forgives Sun, and she decides she does not want to go with Locke.

When Sayid returns to begin ferrying people back to the freighter, Juliet states Sun should be the first to go as she is pregnant and as Aaron is in her care. When they reach the boat, Sun is shocked to see Michael; their conversation is cut short when masses of C4 are found. Jin tells Sun to go back on deck where she looks on nervously. In the season finale, Sun manages to get on the helicopter piloted by Lapidus, where the rest of the Oceanic Six are already seated. Sun, however, refuses to leave Jin behind, who is still attempting to postpone the blast. Amid chaos, Sun is forced onto the helicopter, and as it becomes airborne, she sees Jin running on deck, waving his hands frantically. Sun pleads with Lapidus to land, but he refuses, since they are low on fuel. The freighter explodes via the strapped bomb monitor on Keamy, whom Ben kills. Sun screams in agony. Jack tells her Jin is gone, and Sun falls into an extended state of shock. The helicopter tries to land back on the Island, but Ben and Locke make it disappear. The six survivors of Oceanic 815, Lapidus, and Desmond take refuge on a raft, and soon they are spotted by Penelope Widmore's rescue ship. The Oceanic Six spend a week on the ship, before heading off to Sumba.

==== After the Island ====
Sun becomes one of the Oceanic Six, one of the six publicly known survivors of Flight 815. As part of the cover-up story, Sun reveals that Jin never made it off the plane after it crashed. Shortly after arriving home in Korea, Sun buys a majority share of her father's company with part of the Oceanic settlement that she received, and tells him that she holds him as one of two people responsible for Jin's death (the second person being Ben, as revealed in Season 5.) Several months later, Sun goes into labor and gives birth to a healthy baby girl. She names her daughter Ji Yeon, due to Jin's request on the island. She is later visited by Hurley, and the two visit Jin's grave, where Sun says that she misses him and was calling for him during labor, knowing that he wasn't there.

A few years later, Sun travels to London to meet with Charles Widmore. She tells him that she knows he is looking for the island, and that the Oceanic Six are lying. She gives Widmore her business card and tells him to contact her when he is ready to work with her before walking away.

=== Season five ===
Sun's quest for vengeance led her from Korea to Los Angeles, where a chance encounter with Charles Widmore turned contentious. Widmore, taken aback by Sun's audacity, demanded to know her motivations. Sun's response was chilling: their sole commonality was a burning desire to eliminate Benjamin Linus. Later, Sun reunited with Kate, absolving her of guilt for prioritizing escape over searching for Jin. Kate, now entrusted with safeguarding Aaron, asked Sun to watch over him while she confronted her past. During her babysitting stint, Sun received a mysterious package containing chocolates and a firearm – an ominous portent. As Kate navigated her complicated past, Sun trailed her to a marina. From the shadows of her car, Sun observed Kate, Hurley and the others deliberating over Aaron's fate. With resolve, Sun grasped the gun and slipped away. A pivotal confrontation with Ben revealed Jin's astonishing survival on the island. Ben produced Jin's wedding ring as proof – Locke had safeguarded it to prevent Sun's return, shielding her from danger. Sun joined forces with Ben and Jack to orchestrate their island homecoming. Under the enigmatic Ms. Hawking's guidance, they discovered an ancient "island tracker" machine pinpointing a narrow window between L.A. and Guam. Boarding a fateful flight with Jack, Kate, Hurley, Sayid and Ben, Sun was enveloped by an ethereal glow. The plane vanished, leaving fate uncertain – had they bridged time and space to reclaim their island destiny?

==== Return to the Island ====
Sun, however, landed, in the year 2007, on Hydra Island near the main Island along with the majority of the 316 passengers (including Ben, Lapidus, and Locke). When Ben moves into the jungle in attempt to return to the main Island, she follows him and is in turn followed by Lapidus. Sun knocks Ben out with a paddle when they reach a pair of canoes and she and Lapidus then continue to the Island. They find the Barracks empty, save for Christian. When Sun asks where Jin is, Christian informs her that he is on the Island, but in the year 1977.

After meeting the supposedly resurrected John Locke, she follows him to the Others' camp. The man posing as Locke tells her that if there is a way to reunite her with her husband, he will find it. When Sun is not present, however, the fake Locke tells Ben that he has no interest in reuniting Sun and Jin. When the Others pass through the old beach camp, Sun finds Charlie's ring inside Aaron's old cradle. She is later present at the Statue remnants when Other Ilana arrives with her people and proves the resurrected Locke to be an impostor by revealing the body of the real John Locke.

=== Season six ===
After the fake Locke, revealed to be the Island's Smoke Monster and more formally the Man in Black, kidnaps Richard and the Others gathered at the Statue depart for the Temple, Sun requests that those still at the statue (herself, Ilana, Ben and Frank) bury Locke. They take his body to the graveyard of 815 survivors near the beach and bury it. After this, the four head to the Temple, where they arrive in the middle of the Smoke Monster's massacre of the Others who remain there, and meet up with Miles. They escape through a passageway and head for the beach.

At the beach, Hurley, Jack, and Richard arrive shortly after. As they all decide what to do next, Sun grows impatient, and retreats to her garden for alone time. However, the Man in Black appears to her and insists that she follow him, since he has Jin. Sun runs off, however, she bumps her head on a low branch and falls unconscious. Upon awakening, she realizes she can no longer speak English; Jack assures her it is because of temporary expressive aphasia. They all decide to destroy the Ajira Airways plane to prevent the Man in Black from escaping, but after a series of disagreements between Richard and Hurley, the group split; Ben, Miles, and Richard will search for more explosives, while the rest will go talk with the Man in Black.

Jack, Hurley, Sun, and Lapidus then run off to join Sawyer and Kate at the docks, hoping to abandon the Man in Black and seek refuge at Hydra Island with Charles Widmore's people. Claire later joins them, but Jack leaves because he wants to stay on the Island, per Jacob's request. Upon arriving there, Sun sees Jin and finally reunites, breaking her aphasia. However, Widmore's people throw them into cages, Widmore claiming this is for their own good. That night, the Man in Black, as the Smoke Monster, attack the base, and Jack frees them. Meeting with Sayid, they make their way to the Ajira flight, but the Man in Black claims that if they are to escape the Island, they should take Widmore's submarine. At the dock, however, Widmore's men engage in a gunfight with them, forcing the submarine to leave Claire and the Man in Black behind. Inside the sub, Jack discovers C-4 in his pack, realizing the Man in Black set them up. While Sawyer wants to disable it, Jack assures that it will be alright, since the Man in Black cannot kill them unless they tamper with the bomb themselves. Sawyer does so, not trusting Jack, but increases the timer. Sayid runs off with the bomb in a suicidal move, trying to save some of the others; it detonates, flooding the sub. Sun is pinned to the wall by fragments, and Jin desperately tries to free her. As the submarine slowly floods, Sun begs Jin to leave her, but he insists on staying, telling her in Korean that they will never be apart again. They share one final passionate kiss and embrace before they drown, holding hands. Shortly after she died, Jack, Kate and Hurley all cried over her and Jin's deaths.

== Development ==
Kim auditioned for the role of Kate however, at her audition, she explained she spoke fluent Korean, having been raised in South Korea, where she had starred in several movies. The producers liked her so much they created Sun just for her. The character was planned to be someone who could not speak English but, after examining her relationship with her husband, the audience would learn she does, in fact, speak it.
