= Michael Dawson (Lost) =

Fictional character of the TV series Lost

- Lost character
- Harold Perrineau as Michael Dawson
- First appearance: "Pilot (Part 1)"
- Last appearance: "Everybody Loves Hugo"
- Created by: Jeffrey Lieber; J. J. Abrams; Damon Lindelof
- Portrayed by: Harold Perrineau
- Centric episode(s): "Special" "Exodus, Part 2" "Adrift" "Three Minutes" "Meet Kevin Johnson"

In-universe information
- Alias: Kevin Johnson
- Species: Human
- Gender: Male
- Occupation: Construction worker, former artist, janitor
- Children: Walt Lloyd
- Nationality: American
- Former residence: New York City, New York, United States

Michael Dawson is a fictional character played by Harold Perrineau on the ABC television series Lost. Michael is one of the survivors of Oceanic Flight 815 who crashes on the show's island. After losing a custody battle with Susan Lloyd (Tamara Taylor), Michael does not see his son Walt (Malcolm David Kelley) for almost ten years. They reunite when she dies, but on their journey home, their plane crashes on a mysterious island in the South Pacific. Here Walt is kidnapped by the Island's previous inhabitants, the Others, and Michael spends his time trying to retrieve him. He is eventually successful, and they leave the Island together, but the guilt over the murders he had to commit to achieve this leads him to an estrangement with his son and a suicide attempt. He returns to the Island on a freighter, but is killed when a bomb on it explodes. Michael reappears as a ghost, and apologizes to Hurley for killing Libby (Cynthia Watros).

Although initially skeptical about the role, Perrineau took it after Lost creator J. J. Abrams told him more about it. Much of the first season arc for Michael was rewritten; he was originally going to be part of a love triangle with Korean couple Sun (Yunjin Kim) and Jin (Daniel Dae Kim), but positive fan reaction to the couple meant this storyline was dropped. After Michael leaves the Island in season two, Perrineau knew he would return to Lost at some point; he felt there was more to tell of Michael's story. Reception for the character has been mixed, though Perrineau's acting was largely praised.

While credited for the entire season, Perrineau's character does not return until his cameo in the fourth season episode "Ji Yeon". While Perrineau signed a multi-season return deal, the character was killed off after five further appearances in the season. Perrineau described the storyline as a "weird stereotype" of a Black father abandoning his son that he deemed uninteresting and admitted to being hesitant about signing on had he known the storyline would have panned out the way it did. In retrospect, Lindelof later expressed regret about the direction of the character's arc in a 2020 podcast interview, defining Michael solely as Walt's father, and how a lack of diversity in the writer's room affected the direction of the character.

== Arc ==
Much of Michael's life before the plane crash is shown in flashbacks during "Special". Susan Lloyd leaves Michael after their son Walt is born, and travels to Amsterdam with Walt. Later, Susan tells him that she intends to get married. Michael becomes enraged, and is hit by a car, leaving him hospitalized for months. Susan tracks him down at the hospital and tries to convince him to give up his parental rights, so that her new husband can adopt Walt. Michael refuses, but in the resulting custody battle Susan convinces him that it is the best decision for Walt. Several years later, Susan dies, and her husband asks Michael to take custody of Walt, who is now living in Australia. Michael agrees, but just before the return flight, calls his mother and asks if she can take Walt instead.

Their plane crashes on an island in the South Pacific; Michael, Walt and Walt's Labrador Vincent are among the survivors. After Vincent runs into the jungle, Michael searches for him, but to no avail; it is later that Locke (Terry O'Quinn) returns Vincent to Michael. Despite this gesture, Michael is skeptical about Locke, and does not want Walt spending time with him. After Michael is attacked by a Korean survivor, Jin, over a gold watch Michael has started wearing, Jin's wife Sun approaches him to explain that it is her father's watch, and in doing so reveals that she speaks English. Michael begins constructing a raft, in hope that he and Walt can escape the Island. After witnessing his completed raft burned down, Michael blames Jin, but later Walt confesses that it was him. Although Walt did not want to leave the Island, he has now changed his mind. Michael and Jin bond after Sun reveals her ability to speak English, and the two men begin work on a second raft. They offer the final space on board to Sawyer (Josh Holloway). In the season finale "Exodus", Michael sets sail with Jin, Sawyer and Walt, and not far from the Island, they encounter a small fishing boat. The occupants of the fishing boat are the Others, who have long inhabited the Island. They kidnap Walt and destroy the raft.

At the beginning of season two, Michael and Sawyer are stranded in the middle of the ocean, with Jin missing. They wash ashore and discover Jin, then are knocked unconscious by one of the survivors from the tail section of the plane. After convincing the tail section survivors that they were on the same plane, they all return to the beach camp of the fuselage survivors. Later, Michael offers to take a shift in the hatch that the survivors have found. Here, he begins receiving computer messages from someone who he thinks is Walt, who gives him directions to where he is being held. Michael ventures off in search of him, but moments after leaving the camp, two of the Others kidnap him and hold him hostage. Michael is told to retrieve their leader, who is held captive in the hatch, then bring Sawyer, Kate (Evangeline Lilly), Jack (Matthew Fox) and Hurley (Jorge Garcia) to them, and they will return Walt and let them leave the Island. In order to free their leader, Ben (Michael Emerson), Michael convinces Ana Lucia (Michelle Rodriguez), who is guarding Ben, that he will kill Ben on her behalf, but instead kills her when she hands over the gun and the combination to the armory. When Libby (Cynthia Watros) walks in on them, a startled Michael shoots her twice. He succeeds in bringing the four requested survivors to the Others, so Ben reunites him with Walt. Michael and Walt are given a boat and coordinates to freedom, and they sail away from the Island.

A flashback during "Meet Kevin Johnson" reveals that they manage to return to New York City, where Michael hands Walt over to Walt's grandmother. Michael then attempts suicide, unable to cope with the guilt of his murders. Tom (M. C. Gainey), one of the Others, arrives, and tells Michael he can redeem himself by saving the other survivors from an imminent threat. Tom gives Michael a passport with the new name of "Kevin Johnson" in order to infiltrate a freighter that is trying to find the Island. On the freighter he receives a call from Ben, who instructs him to send him information on all the crew, then to sabotage the radio room and the boat engines. In his first season four appearance, Michael meets Sayid (Naveen Andrews) and Desmond (Henry Ian Cusick), who have managed to get from the Island to the freighter. They tell the freighter's captain of Michael's true identity, who orders him to repair the engines. During the season finale, Michael and Jin attempt to disarm a bomb planted on the freighter. Michael slows the bomb's detonation with liquid nitrogen, then tells Jin to leave, when he is almost out of nitrogen. When the supply of nitrogen runs out, Christian Shephard (John Terry) appears to Michael and tells him he can go now. The bomb detonates, and Michael is killed in the explosion, having achieved the redemption he had been seeking. Michael reappears halfway through the sixth season as a ghost that only Hurley can see. He explains that the whispers on the island are the voices of those who have died on the island. As Hurley turns to depart, Michael stops him and apologizes for the pain he caused for both him and Libby.

== Characteristics ==
During season two, Perrineau stated "[Michael]'s nicer than I expected him to be. Or, he is nicer so far than I expected him to be ... I try to take characters that I think are challenging and a little complicated and hopefully really smart and thoughtful and compassionate. I think Michael is all those things. He seems to have a lot of bad luck." He defends Michael's behavior in season two, saying "[Michael] keeps stepping into more trouble than he actually asked for". Cynthia Littleton of Variety described Michael as "one of the most interesting of the Oceanic 815-ers: flawed, tortured, hard to read, volatile, fighting his innate talents, his own worst enemy, at times, and at others, a totally stand-up guy." IGN's Chris Carabott calls Michael a "natural" father. Michael is known for frequently shouting "Walt!", "Where's my son!" and "Have you seen my boy?".

== Development ==
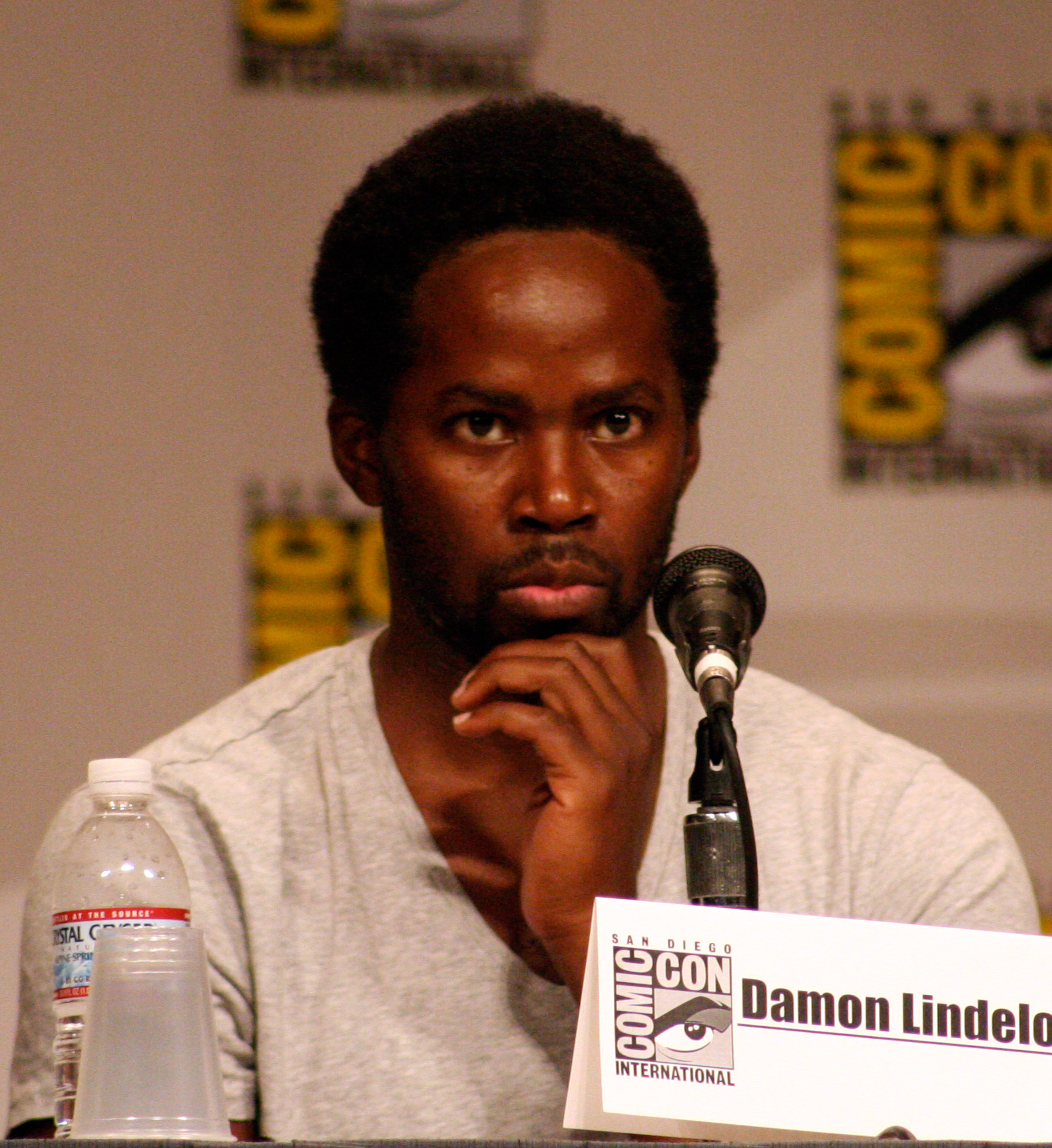
Perrineau during Lost's slot at Comic-Con 2007.

When the producers were auditioning actors for roles in Lost, Harold Perrineau was in the area. The producers called it a "natural move" to have him audition. Although initially skeptical about the show, he took the role when Lost creator J. J. Abrams explained more about it. Perrineau was attracted to the role because "[Michael]'s a guy that's in a lot of conflict and we're not exactly sure why". In season one, Michael was going to be part of a love triangle with Sun and Jin, however this was dropped after positive fan reaction to Sun and Jin's relationship. The storyline is revisited in the Missing Pieces mobisode "Buried Secrets", which shows Michael and Sun almost kissing. Michael and Jin were going to be enemies throughout all of the season, but the producers felt Perrineau and Daniel Dae Kim had good chemistry, so the storyline was changed to them becoming friends. Perrineau called filming the first season "one of [his] best years as a working actor".

Lost writer Elizabeth Sarnoff explained that Michael's storyline in season two is about "what a father will do to save his son"; she noted "there's nothing worse than what he does". The second episode of season two was originally going to be Sawyer centric, however this was rewritten "at the proverbial last minute" and changed to a Michael centric episode. Perrineau received swimming lessons in preparation for this episode. Perrineau was unaware that his character had been captured by the Others until he was told Michael was going to kill Ana Lucia and Libby. Perrineau described shooting the scenes in "Two for the Road" where Michael murders Ana Lucia and Libby as a "tough day". The last scene shot of season two was Michael and Walt sailing away from the Island. As it was a long camera shot, Perrineau had to sail the boat so far from the pier, that by the time he returned, all the equipment had already been packed away. He said, "It felt fitting, actually. Like; that's it". Perrineau knew he would be back one day, but as the producers did not reveal any details to him, he did not know when. He was the first actor that left the show as "part of a grander design to come back", and the only one until Emilie de Ravin.

After leaving the Island in the second-season finale "Live Together, Die Alone", Michael was supposed to return in the season three finale, but Perrineau was filming the pilot of Demons, so was unable to return. Instead he returned in the seventh episode of season four, "Ji Yeon". His return was meant to be announced during Lost's slot at the 2007 Comic-Con International, however there were complaints at the Television Critics Association Press Tour when ABC's President of Entertainment Stephen McPherson commented that "some big announcements" would be made at the Lost panel. Some journalists felt that any announcements should be made to them at the press meeting, rather than at a fan convention. After numerous reporters asked about what would be announced, Lost producer Damon Lindelof was contacted, and he gave permission for McPherson to say Harold Perrineau would be returning to Lost. At Comic-Con, Lindelof confirmed Perrineau would be back as a cast member, not just for a flashback. Lost producer Carlton Cuse said "Michael's story is for us one of the most becoming storylines on the show because here's a character who ... undertook some very extreme actions in order to basically get his son off the Island, and then when he sailed off in that boat I think everyone was very curious about what happened to him, what is his fate ... we really feel that Michael's story will be a really compelling part of the season." Perrineau was disappointed that he was brought back to the show only to be killed, and that Michael does not get a chance to reunite with his son, Walt, saying, "there are all these questions about how [the writers] respond to black people on the show ... Walt just winds up being another fatherless child. It plays into a really big, weird stereotype and, being a black person myself, that wasn't so interesting." Cuse responded "We pride ourselves on having a very racially diverse cast. It's painful when any actor's storyline ends on the show. Harold is a fantastic actor whose presence added enormously to Lost". Perrineau later said he should have thought before making a racial comment, and although he felt like that, he never discussed the matter with the producers. Perrineau said that although he would be happy to return to Lost, he would have to know what the storyline would be.

== Reception ==
Michael's first centric episode, "Special", was well received by critics. Chris Carabott of IGN said "Michael's flashback is a heart wrenching look at the relationship, or lack-there-of, between him and his son Walt." He added "As Michael's life crumble around him, it's Harold Perrineau's brilliant performance that really shines through." Kirthana Ramisetti from Entertainment Weekly called it the best episode since "Walkabout" because of Michael's character development. She said "One of my favorite scenes of the entire season ... was Michael and Walt bonding over the letters and the drawing of the sunburned penguin. It was moving to see these two finally relating to each other as father and son after everything they've been through."

Michael's first centric episode in season two was less well received. Mac Slocum of Filmfodder.com said "it wasn't all that interesting". Entertainment Weekly's Jeff Jensen called the flashbacks "among the poorest and most clumsily integrated flashbacks we've seen so far", as he felt nothing new was learned. He did not like Michael's on-Island storyline either, noting he "got the sense that the actors and directors weren't quite sure what to make of these scenes". Three episodes later, Jensen thought Michael's "whiny dad act" became "increasingly tedious". When Michael murdered Ana Lucia and Libby in "Two for the Road", Slocum called it the "single biggest shocker in Lost history". C. K. Sample of AOL's TV Squad wrote that although he suspected that Ana Lucia and Libby were going to die, he thought what "was amazing was who shot them". Zap2it's Amy Amatangelo described the double murder as "a brilliant move", because "one of their own [became] one of them". She added it was "one of [the second] season's most jaw-dropping moments". According to Perrineau, it made fans "pissed off" with Michael. Jensen praised Perrineau's acting, saying "Michael's bloody betrayal is hard to swallow, but Harold Perrineau sells it". Many reviewers joked about how frequently Michael shouts "Walt!", such as Alan Sepinwall of The Star-Ledger, Erin Martell of AOL's TV Squad, and Joshua Rich of Entertainment Weekly. Perrineau co-won the 2005 Screen Actors Guild Award for "Best Ensemble – Drama Series.

Joshua Rich from Entertainment Weekly had mixed views on the prospect of Michael returning in season four, because although Perrineau was one of his "favorite" actors, he liked how peaceful the series had become without Michael constantly screaming "Walt!". IGN's Chris Carabott called Michael's return "the worst kept secret in Lost history", but still found his reveal "exciting". Alan Sepinwall of The Star-Ledger found "a fine performance from Mr. Perrineau" in "Meet Kevin Johnson". Sepinwall wrote that Michael's "struggle to deal with the guilt from his Faustian bargain to save Walt was another moving example of how the writers this season are really trying to build on the emotional impact of everything that's happened before." Cynthia Littleton of Variety was "really happy" to see Michael again, and wrote "Perrineau plays it just right most of the time—no hysterics or scenery-chewing, just a man trying to do the right thing, most of the time." Digital Spy's Ben Rawson-Jones commented that "[Michael's] suicidal plight was well conveyed and there were plenty of shocks and thrills along the way". Before the fourth season finale aired, Entertainment Weekly's Jeff Jensen ranked Michael being unable to commit suicide as the thirteenth best moment of the season, but did add "This story line didn't match the hype". Oscar Dahl from BuddyTV called Michael's death "the culmination of a fairly lackluster story arc".
