= Shannon Rutherford =

Character from the American mystery fiction television series Lost

- Lost character
- Maggie Grace as Shannon Rutherford
- First appearance: "Pilot (Part 1)"
- Last appearance: "The End"
- Created by: Jeffrey Lieber; J. J. Abrams; Damon Lindelof
- Portrayed by: Maggie Grace
- Centric episode(s): Individual: "Abandoned"; Shared: "Exodus, Part 1"

In-universe information
- Full name: Shannon Rutherford
- Species: Human
- Gender: Female
- Occupation: Ballet instructor Extortionist
- Nationality: American
- Former residence: Los Angeles, California, US

Shannon Rutherford is a fictional character played by Maggie Grace on the ABC drama television series Lost, which chronicled the lives of the survivors of a plane crash in the South Pacific. Shannon was introduced in the pilot episode as the stepsister of fellow crash survivor Boone Carlyle (Ian Somerhalder). She was a series regular until her funeral in "What Kate Did". For most of her time on the Island, she was unhelpful and spent much of her time sunbathing. She formed a relationship with another survivor from the plane crash, Sayid Jarrah (Naveen Andrews). Shannon was accidentally shot and killed by Ana Lucia Cortez, who mistakes her for an Other.

During the casting process, she was compared to Paris Hilton. Naveen Andrews, who played the character Sayid on the show, had the idea of encouraging the writers to write a romantic relationship between his character and Shannon into the story. Critics found her to be a largely unsympathetic character until only shortly before her death. Nonetheless, Grace received a Teen Choice Award nomination for her role as Shannon.

== Appearances ==
=== Prior to the crash ===
When Shannon is eight, her father marries Sabrina Carlyle (Lindsay Frost), and she spends much of her adolescence with her stepbrother Boone. She studies ballet and, as she gets older, teaches dance classes to young girls. When she is eighteen, Shannon's father dies in a car crash. He did not have a will prepared, so all of his money and property goes to his wife. Sabrina refuses to help Shannon financially, despite Shannon winning a prestigious yet non-paying internship to the Martha Graham Dance Company in New York. Unable to come up with the money herself, Shannon moves to France for a short time to work as an au pair. Shannon later forms a plan to con her stepbrother, Boone Carlyle, into giving her some of the inheritance she rightly deserved. Playing on her knowledge of Boone's love for her, she makes it appear her boyfriend Brian abuses her. Boone pays Brian to leave her, and Shannon plans to secretly take half the money. During one con in Sydney, her "abusive boyfriend" ruins Shannon's ruse after Boone cuts him a check. Boone storms off to his hotel room and plans to return to the States. When Shannon's boyfriend takes off with all of the money, Shannon goes to Boone's hotel room in Sydney, drunk, and Boone allows her to seduce him. After they have sex, Shannon tells Boone things will go back to the way they had been before. He expresses anger because, as always, they both know she is in control of their situation and relationship. The following morning at the Sydney airport, Sayid Jarrah approaches Shannon, asking her to watch his bag for him. She deftly obliges, but soon leaves it unattended. Before the doomed Flight 815 takes off, Shannon rummages through her hand luggage for her asthma inhaler, which Boone casually hands to her. Six hours into the flight, only moments before the crash, Shannon and Boone are momentarily seen as Charlie Pace stumbles through their row.

=== After the crash ===
Upon landing on the Island, she decides to join Sayid on a hike to transmit a distress signal, after she and Boone have an argument about her selfishness. When they discover a French looped signal already being transmitted, Shannon's knowledge of the language is used to translate it. Later, Shannon has an asthma attack, but her inhalers are nowhere to be found. Sun (Yunjin Kim) cures her, by using eucalyptus plants to help her breathing. Because of her selfish and manipulative behavior, Boone brands Shannon useless. Sayid enlists her to help translate the maps belonging to the French woman who made the radio transmission, Danielle Rousseau (Mira Furlan). Shannon and Sayid soon form a romantic relationship. After returning from a romantic night along the beach with Sayid, she learns Boone has died after falling from a great height. At his funeral, Shannon does not speak, but allows Sayid to talk instead. Shannon holds Locke (Terry O'Quinn) responsible for Boone's death, and asks Sayid to take action. When he refuses, she steals the key to the gun case from Jack Shephard (Matthew Fox) and holds Locke at gunpoint in the jungle. When Rousseau arrives on the beach one morning to warn the camp of the Others' imminent arrival, Shannon prepares to migrate to the caves with the rest of the group. Before leaving on the raft the survivors have built, Walt Lloyd (Malcolm David Kelley) gives Shannon guardianship of his dog, Vincent, as a means to help her recover from her loss.

At the start of season two, Shannon loses Vincent in the jungle. While searching for him, she is shocked to find Walt standing before her, dripping wet. However, when Sayid finds her, Walt disappears. Over the next few days, Sayid builds Shannon a shelter on the beach. He brings her to it and they soon decide to sleep together for the first time. Sayid leaves to get a bottle of water for Shannon and in his absence, Shannon again sees a vision of Walt, standing in the shelter with her. Sayid brushes off her experience as a dream. She uses Vincent to try to find Walt, only for him to lead her to Boone's grave. After a while, she takes Vincent into the jungle again, with Sayid in pursuit. As it starts to rain, Sayid and Shannon admit their feelings for each other before both seeing Walt. Shannon runs after him, only to be accidentally shot by Ana Lucia (Michelle Rodriguez), who mistakes her for an Other. She dies moments later in Sayid's arms. Shannon's death not only left Sayid heartbroken, but also caused a rift between the survivors and the Tailies. Throughout the rest of the season, Ana Lucia is shown to be guilt-ridden over killing Shannon.

During season six the afterlife experienced by the survivors is shown as an alternate timeline where the plane never crashed. Boone is seen on the plane traveling alone and explains he went to save Shannon from a bad relationship, but she did not want to come with him. In the series finale "The End" Boone is being attacked by someone outside a local bar, with Hurley and Sayid watching from afar. Shannon tries to defend him but is overpowered. Sayid gets out of the car and knocks the attacker unconscious. He gets down to help Shannon, and they remember their lives on the island and realize they are in the afterlife. Later that night she is reunited with the other passengers of Oceanic 815 and they all "move on" together.

== Personality ==
During the casting process, Shannon was compared to Paris Hilton, and Lost producer Damon Lindelof described her as a "bitch. She is like a typical spoiled daddy's girl who gets whatever she wants and is not responsible to the slightest bit." Eirik Knutzen of The Repository found Shannon to be "a self-centered twit," and she was also called a "spoiled daddy's girl." Boone describes her as a "self-centered little bitch." On her first night on the Island, Shannon is confident they will be rescued, refusing to help the others organize the luggage. She does not care Rose (L. Scott Caldwell) has lost her husband, and spends much of her time sunbathing. She manipulates Charlie (Dominic Monaghan) into catching a fish for her, after which Boone apologizes on behalf of Shannon for "using this poor guy like [she] use[s] everyone else." In "Whatever the Case May Be," Boone says to Shannon, "Don't you see the way they look at us around here? They don't take us seriously. We're a joke. I'm trying to contribute something. You're just – you're useless." This motivates her to help Sayid translate maps he obtained from Rousseau.

== Development ==
The producers were looking for someone who had a "Paris Hilton quality" to play Shannon, but she could not just be shallow, as the storyline would require more than that. A lot of women auditioned before the producers finally settled on Maggie Grace. She was written to be unlikable in the first season as the producers needed a character they could use to create opposition and conflict. The producers thought it would be interesting for there to be more to Shannon and Boone's relationship than just Boone's possessive brotherly interest. They came up with the idea for them to be unrelated stepsiblings, who have a romantic encounter, which became the twist for their backstory. When Boone is killed at the end of season one, it forces Shannon into a more adult existence on the Island. Grace noted Boone is "the only person that ever really knew and loved Shannon, in spite of herself. Of course, losing him, especially with so much left unsaid and unresolved, will change her irrevocably." This freed her up to develop her relationship with Sayid. Naveen Andrews, who plays Sayid, came up with the idea for Shannon and Sayid relationship. He thought, "What would really shock Middle-America? What if Sayid was to have a relationship with a woman that looked like Miss America? The most unlikely pairing… to come completely from left field." This pairing made Shannon "less flighty... more of a person to be reckoned with." According to Lost producer Carlton Cuse, "The relationships [the audience] expect on the show are not necessarily the ones that we [the producers] necessarily are going to give you, but we want to try to find ways in which characters that you don't expect to kind of connect to one another to connect in ways that are kind of surprising."

Shannon's flashbacks in "Abandoned" were used to allow the audience to get to a "really emotional level with the character, [to] finally understand ... why she was the way she was." Her death was planned before the start of season two, as the producers wanted the survivors in the tail section of the plane and the survivors of the fuselage to be forced to come together under difficult circumstances. Her death was also used to "spin Sayid off in another direction." Damon Lindelof commented "It's sort of understood on Lost that that's what you sign up for. There's going to be constant character turnover, because the stakes on the Island are life-or-death." Lindelof felt an "intense, emotional sense of loss" when watching her death. In her post-death appearance in "Collision," Maggie Grace was credited as "special guest star." She received the same billing when she returned in season three, appearing in Nikki and Paulo's flashbacks. Carlton Cuse noted "it was really fun for us to actually have Boone and Shannon reemerge in the stories." Shannon was originally in "LA X", the season premiere for the sixth and final season, but had to be written out as Grace was unavailable. The producers eventually arranged for Grace to appear in "The End".

== Reception ==
Chris Carabott from IGN was critical of both Shannon and her relationship with Boone before the plane crash, commenting "Shannon's ability to 'sort-of' understand French and Boone's lifeguard training have had little impact and as characters they bring very little to the table. There are also too many more intriguing storylines and characters around them that deserve attention." On their relationship he added, "except for the final act, when they finally succumb to their lust for one another ... There's nothing exciting here or anything that will ultimately be built upon in the Lost universe." In a later review, for the episode following Boone's death, he commented "[Boone and Shannon] were both left with very little to do this season. Especially Shannon, whose high point of usefulness was deciphering Rousseau's documents for Sayid. Well, Maggie Grace is given an opportunity to shine and she does an acceptable job as the distraught sibling who is now looking for someone to blame for Boone's death. We finally get to see some real depth to Shannon's character and her quest for vengeance is believable." According to Melanie McFarland of the Seattle Post-Intelligencer, Shannon is "the least deserving of sympathy of all the previously known survivors."

C. K. Sample, III, from AOL's TV Squad, joked, "Boone's mother is the devil. How else to make us sympathize with Shannon right before killing her off of the show." Virginia Rohan of The Seattle Times thought the "death of troubled Shannon, just as she was becoming more likable and had found love with Sayid, was sadder than the first-season death of her stepbrother, Boone. Still, it would grieve me far more to lose Jack, Kate, Sawyer, Locke, Sun or Jin." Maureen Ryan of the Chicago Tribune felt fans echoed this view, describing their reaction as "muted," as they were more angry at Ana Lucia for shooting Shannon. Maggie Grace co-won the 2005 Screen Actors Guild Award for "Best Ensemble - Drama Series. She was also nominated for the Teen Choice Award for "Choice TV Breakout Performance - Female," but lost out to Desperate Housewives' Eva Longoria.
