= Jin-Soo Kwon =

Fictional character of the TV series Lost

Kwon Jin-Soo (Jin)
- Lost character
- Daniel Dae Kim as Jin
- First appearance: "Pilot (Part 1)"
- Last appearance: "The End"
- Created by: Jeffrey Lieber; J. J. Abrams; Damon Lindelof
- Portrayed by: Daniel Dae Kim
- Centric episode(s): "…In Translation" "...And Found" "The Glass Ballerina" "Ji Yeon" "This Place Is Death" "The Package"

In-universe information
- Full name: Jin-Soo Kwon
- Species: Human
- Gender: Male
- Occupation: Doorman/business assistant
- Spouse: Sun-Hwa Kwon
- Children: Ji Yeon Kwon
- Nationality: South Korean
- Former residence: Namhae, South Korea

Korean name
- Hangul: 권진수
- RR: Gwon Jinsu
- MR: Kwŏn Chinsu

Jin-Soo Kwon, better known as "Jin," is a fictional character on the ABC television series Lost played by Daniel Dae Kim.

== Character biography ==
=== Prior to the crash ===
Jin-Soo Kwon was born on 27 November 1974 in Namhae, South Korea, to a poor fisherman and a prostitute, the latter of which abandoned Jin and his father during his infancy. Jin had since been told that his mother died when he was young. Even though he was not sure about being Jin's father, the fisherman raised Jin, knowing that no one else would. As an adult, Jin attempted to follow his dreams of owning his own restaurant and hotel, and applied for a job at Seoul Gateway Hotel. Jin's heritage is recognized by the owner who employs him as a doorman, under strict instructions to keep "people like him" out of the hotel. When Jin allowed a disheveled man's son to use the hotel toilets, the owner rebuked him, prompting Jin to quit on the spot. Shortly after leaving, Jin literally bumped into Sun Paik (Yunjin Kim). After finding work as a waiter elsewhere, Jin visited Sun's father to ask for her hand in marriage. Jin disowned his heritage in order to gain Mr. Paik's respect, and in doing so was given a job as a floor manager in one of his factories. Sun and Jin were wed, and at their wedding reception, unknowingly spoke with Jacob, who congratulated them and told them (in fluent Korean, to the amusement of the couple) to never take each other, or their love, for granted. Two months after marrying Sun, Jin was assigned to present an associate with a stuffed panda to congratulate a newborn, a task in which Jin was faced with various obstructions. Later Jin was promoted to working as an "enforcer" for Mr. Paik, who had no qualms about the use of bribery, blackmail, extortion, and murder to succeed.

While Jin was unaware as to the reason of his sudden promotion, it put a strain on his relationship with Sun. Jin's first assignment was to "convince" a government official to overlook the violating environmental regulations caused by one of Paik's factories. Jin gave the official's puppy to Sun as a gift, but on the second visit, Jin violently beat him to prevent a hitman from killing him. Jin returned home covered in blood, but refrained from telling Sun about the work her father ordered him to do. Despite their problems, Jin and Sun tried to conceive children. However; after a visit with a fertility doctor, Jin grew angry upon learning that Sun could not conceive, and accused her of knowing all along. The doctor later admitted to Sun that the opposite was true, that Jin was the one who was sterile. The doctor was afraid to reveal this to Jin for fear of retribution, as he knew of Jin's work for Mr. Paik. Later, Paik ordered Jin to kill Jae Lee, though he did not reveal to Jin the reason (he was having an affair with Sun). Following orders, Jin confronted Jae Lee at his hotel room and violently beat him. Instead of killing him; however, Jin told him to leave the country and never return. Upon returning to his car, Jin was startled when Jae Lee landed on his car after jumping from his hotel room as a supposed act of suicide. Later, Jin was assigned on a secret mission to deliver watches to two of Mr. Paik's associates in Sydney and Los Angeles. Jin took Sun with him, telling her that it was a vacation. Before leaving Korea, Jin visited his estranged father, much to his delight. Jin told his father about the turmoil that had plagued his life since being employed by Mr. Paik. Jin's father told him to remain in the United States upon arrival and never return. Jin decided to follow through with this plan. After checking in at the airport in Sydney, Jin used the restrooms after Sun accidentally spilled coffee on him. As Jin was washing his hands, he was approached by one of Mr. Paik's associates (a Caucasian who shocked Jin by speaking Korean to him), who revealed he knew Jin's hidden agenda, and warned him to deliver the watches or risk losing Sun. Jin then moved on to board the doomed flight.

=== After the crash ===
==== Season one ====
Upon landing on the island, Jin becomes overprotective of Sun, and forbids her from consorting with the other survivors. Whenever she is approached, Jin scolds her for her immodest appearance (most notably when her top button is undone). While the two remain isolated from the others, Jin prepares sea urchin and offers it to the survivors, the only one to turn him down being Hurley (Jorge Garcia). Jin spends most of his time fishing, whilst also keeping a watchful eye over his wife. One morning, Jin assaults Michael (Harold Perrineau, Jr.) and attempts to kill him in front of his son, Walt (Malcolm David Kelley). Jin is handcuffed to the wreckage as a result, released only after Michael cuts him free and returns his gold watch to him. (For this reason, Jin continues to wear one handcuff around his wrist, until it is cut off partway into the second season). Later, Jin and Sun move into the caves. When Jack (Matthew Fox) is caught in a cave in, Jin contributes in moving the rubble aside. He soon frowns upon Sun wearing revealing clothes, and even more so when she helps Shannon (Maggie Grace) overcome her asthma.

Later, Jin grabs Sun and yells at her when she decides to go bathing. It is only after Michael intervenes that Jin suspects something going on between the two. That night, Michael's raft is burned down. Jin helps in stopping the flames, but flees to the caves when his hands are scorched. Regardless, Michael blames Jin for the arson attack, and he and Sawyer (Josh Holloway) take their anger out on him by beating him in front of the whole camp. It is only after Sun, revealing her secret to Jin, begs them to stop that Jin is released. He returns to the caves to collect his belongings, blanking out Sun, and joins Michael in building a second raft. Over time, the two begin bonding, eventually becoming mutual friends. Jin stops building the raft only when he hears the distress calls from Kate (Evangeline Lilly) and Claire (Emilie de Ravin) in the jungle, where he must help in delivering the baby.

On the day that the raft sets sail, Sun approaches Jin and gives him a phrasebook she had written for him. Jin apologizes for his actions, and vows to find rescue for her. The two reconcile before departing. Out at sea, Jin helps to maintain the raft's condition. When they encounter the Others that night, Jin dives into the water in an attempt to save Sawyer.

==== Season two ====
Upon the raft's destruction, Jin washes ashore, being discovered by Libby (Cynthia Watros) and Cindy (Kimberley Joseph). He is taken into the jungle and tied to a tree. Jin breaks free and flees to the beach, encountering Michael and Sawyer. Believing the people to be Others, he attempts to warn the two, until the three are beaten unconscious by Mr. Eko (Adewale Akinnuoye-Agbaje) and thrown into a pit. Upon being released, and their situation mutual, the tail-section survivors lead Jin, Michael and Sawyer back to the Arrow station. Before heading off to migrate with the fuselage camp, Jin offers his expertise by catching fish with Ana Lucia (Michelle Rodriguez) and Bernard (Sam Anderson). When Michael disappears in the jungle, Jin and Mr. Eko run after him, narrowly avoiding an encounter with the Others. The three catch up to the rest of the group, traveling up until Ana Lucia shoots Shannon. Jin is forced to remain behind with Libby and Bernard, until they are given the go-ahead to move on, and being reunited with Sun. The two attend Shannon's funeral.

When Jin learns that Michael has gone off to search for Walt, Jin attempts to join the search party, but Sun forbids him to leave her again. Later, Jin grows concerned for his wife when she falls victim to a failed kidnap attempt. Jack and Jin intend to exact revenge on the Others, only for Sawyer to reveal that they had fallen for his long con. Still worried, Jin forbids Sun from tending to her garden, tearing it up in the process. Later, Jin realizes how much he needs her, and attempts to repair the garden. It is then that Sun informs him of her pregnancy, and that it was he who is infertile. Jin considers this a miracle and rejoices. Jin later volunteers to help Bernard build a giant S.O.S. sign in the beach. He is the last person remaining when he decides to quit.

When Michael leads Jack, Kate, Sawyer and Hurley to the Others' camp, Sayid (Naveen Andrews) asks Jin to accompany him to the camp via Desmond's (Henry Ian Cusick) boat, to which he accepts only when Sun also insists on going. As they sail to the Other's camp, they pass a strange statue of a four-toed foot. They arrive at the camp, which turns out to be fake. Before setting off, Jin is deafened by a high-pitched noise as the island is engulfed in a strange violet glow.

==== Season three ====
Jin is still on board the boat with Sun and Sayid, and suggests they return to the beach, only to be overruled by Sun and Sayid. They arrive at the pier, where Sayid starts a signal fire. Jin, knowing about Sayid's plan, demands to be given a gun whilst telling Sun that he understands more English than she thinks. That night, Jin and Sayid wait by the end of the pier for the Others to arrive; they are startled to find that they have instead arrived by sea and have gone directly for the boat, where Sun is hiding. Jin dives into the water as the boat sails away, and is reunited with Sun once again when she escapes. The three return to the beach soon after. Days after returning, Sun starts speaking to Jin in English, in an attempt to help him learn. Jin is stubborn, and is left to help Hurley overturn a van in the jungle. When Sawyer arrives, he teaches Jin three phrases that he describes as "what women want to hear" (which are, incidentally, "I'm sorry", "You were right" and "Those pants don't make you look fat.") Hurley and Charlie (Dominic Monaghan) get the van running, and the four enjoy a joyriding session before returning to the beach, filled with hope.

Jin finds himself involved in the investigation over the apparent deaths of survivors Nikki and Paulo (Kiele Sanchez and Rodrigo Santoro). Jin, Hurley and Sawyer find Paulo lying in the jungle. After a brief examination of the surroundings, Jin concludes that the "Monster" had killed him. Later, he attends the funeral, unaware that Nikki has opened her eyes moments before being buried. Upon Jack, Kate and Sayid returning to the beach with Juliet (Elizabeth Mitchell) in tow, Jin shares the same disliking to her as the rest of the camp. Later, Jin joins Hurley, Charlie and Desmond on a trek into the jungle. They witness the bailing of a helicopter pilot that night, and head inland to find them, encountering several pieces of luggage on the way. Jin and Hurley find her hanging from a tree, and the four cut her loose. When Mikhail (Andrew Divoff) arrives, Jin chases after him and catches him. After helping Naomi (Marsha Thomason), Jin pursues Mikhail once again when he steals her satellite phone. The four take her back to the camp and hide her in Hurley's tent. After she speaks to the camp that night, Juliet's recorder is played to the group, mentioning Sun's pregnancy. Jin asks Sun about Juliet's message, to which he learns of a healthy fetus. When Karl (Blake Bashoff) arrives to warn them of the Others' imminent arrival, Jin volunteers to stay behind and detonate the dynamite inside the targeted tents, along with Sayid and Bernard. That night, Jin's inaccuracy causes the plan to backfire, and three are taken hostage by the surviving Others. The next day, Jin is held at gunpoint in order for the Others to extract the camp's initial plan from Bernard. The three are saved when Hurley, Sawyer and Juliet arrive on the beach and eliminate the Others.

==== Season four ====
Shortly after confirmation that Jack has made contact with the freighter, Jin watches and listens as Desmond delivers Charlie's warning, and ventures into the jungle to meet up with the rest of the camp. After reuniting with Sun, Jin decides to return to the beach with Jack rather than join Locke (Terry O'Quinn) at the barracks. Jin and Sun discuss what they will name their baby, and Jin suggest Ji Yeon. Sun insists it's too early. After a conversation with Kate, Sun decides to head to Locke's camp. In hopes of stopping this Juliet reveals Sun's medical condition, and the affair she had to Jin. Although angry at first, Jin realizes that he was not supportive of Sun and that he pushed her away, so he forgives her and promises that he will never leave her. Later, Sayid returns with the speedboat to take people to the boat. Jin and Sun go with the first group, taking Aaron with them. On the boat, they encounter Michael for the first time since he left the island. Upon discovering a bomb on the boat, Jin, Michael and Desmond attempt to disarm it. While their attempts manage to stall the bomb's detonation, Jin is left on the boat during the bomb's detonation. The freighter explodes and sinks beneath the ocean leading to Sun and the rest of the Oceanic Six believing him to have died in the explosion.

At the Oceanic 6 conference when a Korean reporter asks Sun if Jin survived the crash, Sun looks very somber and pauses for a minute before replying that he did not. Sun later buys a controlling share of her father's company as retribution for, in her view, his hand in Jin's death. Sun names her daughter Ji Yeon as Jin had asked.

Jin's grave in Korea lists the date of the plane crash (Sept 22, 2004) as the date of his death.

==== Season five ====
In the fourth episode of the season, after another shift in time, Jin is found unconscious floating on some debris from the freighter by a group of people in a life raft, who turn out to be a young and pregnant Danielle Rousseau (Young: Melissa Farman; Older: Mira Furlan) along with her research team. After realizing who Danielle Rousseau is, Jin is shocked to realize he has traveled back in time to 1988.

Jin travels with Danielle's group and leads them to the radio tower. On their way, the smoke monster appears in the middle of the jungle and kills a female member of her group called Nadine. The leader of the group, Montard is dragged down beneath the wall of the temple by the monster. The rest of the group decide to go rescue Montard, but Jin tells Danielle to stay. Suddenly, Jin is torn away through time in front of Danielle and reappears later, she kills the last of her group's survivors because she believes that they had become sick and "changed". She tries to kill Jin but he escapes. Another time jump allows him to meet up with Sawyer, Locke, Juliet, Faraday (Jeremy Davies), Miles (Ken Leung) and Charlotte (Rebecca Mader).

Jin assists the group with Locke's plan to leave the island and return with the escapees. Threatening his seeming escape via a rope down a well, he makes him promise not to bring Sun back.

===== 1970s =====
Soon after Locke is separated from the group Jin, Sawyer, Juliet and Miles get sent to an ancient time, in which a gigantic statue is seen standing far away from them. After Locke moves the Island by turning the frozen wheel, they get transported to 1974. They then head back to Daniel who informs them that the violent shifts through time had killed Charlotte but that they now had also stopped and wherever they are now they were there to stay. Jin and the others then rescue a woman from the DHARMA Initiative called Amy from two Others and they then move into the barracks with other DHARMA members. They are welcomed to stay there.

Three years later, in 1977, Jin along with Sawyer (under the alias James LaFleur), Juliet, and Miles are all shown to be still there. Jin can now speak fluent English, as is shown in his conversation with Sawyer where he both understands and replies to Sawyer regarding John's quest to bring the others back. Jin's job is to search for Locke and their friends. For the three years there were no signs. But one morning, Jin drives across a waterfall and discovers Jack, Kate and Hurley and he drives all three of them to meet Sawyer.

While on a perimeter check he notices the men fleeing into the bushes. He steps out of his vehicle to acknowledge little Ben (Young: Sterling Beaumon; Old: Michael Emerson), who is a reluctant member of DHARMA, and fugitive Sayid. Sayid says that LaFleur gave him the opportunity to run. As Jin calls LaFleur to confirm this Sayid attacks Jin and knocks him unconscious. Sayid leaves him and Ben behind after shooting Ben in the chest with Jin's sidearm. Jin later gains consciousness and brings Ben to the DHARMA infirmary.

Later, Sawyer holds a meeting to decide what to do after their presence in the Dharma Initiative becomes risky. Eventually, the survivors decide to leave the DHARMA Initiative and start all over at the beach. However, their plan is foiled when Sawyer and Juliet are caught.

Jin, Hurley, and Miles aid Jack and Sayid in taking them to the Swan Station construction site via DHARMA van, where they plan to detonate the electromagnetic pocket and prevent Oceanic 815 from ever crashing twenty-seven years from now. Jin is tending to a critically injured Sayid, who was shot by Ben's father (Jon Gries), when Juliet manages to detonate the hydrogen bomb, leaving all of their fate unknown.

==== Season six ====
Jin and his friends jump back through time to 2007, still on the Island, after the explosion. He joins Hurley, Jack, Miles, Kate, Sawyer and Sayid in the Temple, the Others' home, to stay protected from the Man in Black/Smoke Monster, but he wants to leave in order to find his wife who he has been told is also on the Island. When Sawyer leaves, he joins Kate and two Others to go look for him; after Kate knocks out the guards to leave the Temple forever, he decides to do the same in order to find Sun. However, the two Others attack him and while running away from them, he gets caught in an old bear trap, which happens to be Claire's. She kills the two Others.

Jin is brought to Claire's home, a hut, where he is treated by Claire. He asks her of her survival on the Island for the past three years, growing suspicious of her. He then is greeted by the Man in Black, masquerading as Locke, whom Claire states is her "friend." While still too hurt to walk and obviously a prisoner, Claire looks at Jin as a friend and even talks to the Man in Black about Jin as an ally to their cause to kill the Others.

Jin is skeptical of the Man in Black and believes he is not Locke. When James, having been captured by the Man in Black, joins him, Jin tells his friend he wants to find Sun first, to which Sawyer agrees. However, Jin has no choice but to follow the Man in Black's group as they journey across the Island. Sawyer and the Man in Black tell him that he is a possible "candidate" of Jacob's (the leader of the Island and enemy of the Man in Black), meaning he may be chosen to watch the Island after Jacob's death. However, he is unaware of the Man in Black's intention to kill him, since he is a candidate. Late one night, while the Man in Black is off retrieving Sun (as she may be a candidate as well), Jin and the others are attacked by Charles Widmore's team. Tranquilized, Jin is brought over to the second Island where Widmore's submarine is docked. Jin wakes up inside a DHARMA Initiative complex and meets Zoe (Sheila Kelley), who eagerly asks him about his hand-drawn map of the electromagnetism pockets, which he drew back in 1977. However, he demands to see Widmore.

Widmore greets Jin and hands him Sun's digital camera. On it, Jin tearfully views photographs of his daughter, seeing his girl for the first time. Widmore then explains to him that everyone will cease to exist should the Man in Black leave the Island, and that he himself is here to prevent that from happening. Jin asks how will he accomplish this, to which Widmore replies that they should see a "package."

When Sawyer's group (which consists of Sawyer, Sun, Claire, Kate, Hurley and Frank Lapidus (Jeff Fahey), the helicopter pilot who appeared in seasons four and five) arrives, he finally reunites with his long-lost love, only for their reunion to be short-lived, when Widmore and Zoe decide to arrest Sawyer's group and Jin.

The group is then thrown into the polar bear cages at the Hydra, but are rescued by the Man in Black, Sayid and Jack. Jin and some of the group enter Widmore's submarine to escape the island, leaving The Man in Black and Claire behind. A bomb is then revealed to be inside Jack's bag, which causes Sayid to run away from the group and explode with the bomb, causing water to gush in and sink the submarine. Sun becomes trapped under wreckage caused by the blast, so Sawyer, Jin and Jack try to free her, but they realize she cannot be removed. Another collision causes Sawyer to get knocked unconscious, causing Jin to plead with Jack to save Sawyer. Despite Sun's pleas for Jin to save himself, he decides to stay with her, they both drown.

=== Afterlife / Flash-sideways ===
In the afterlife, Jin works at Mr. Paik's company, and that is where he met Sun, eventually having an affair. Jin is assigned to deliver a watch and a wad of cash to deliver in a meeting. Jin is on Oceanic Airlines Flight 815, and Sun accompanies him. At Los Angeles International Airport, he fails to declare the cash at customs, since he couldn't understand English and does not know how to claim it. He misses the meeting in the process. Jin and Sun then go back to their hotel, and they both make out in Sun's room. The next morning, two men named Martin Keamy (Kevin Durand) and Omar (Anthony Azizi) arrive to get the watch and the money. Since Keamy and Omar cannot understand them, they consult the help of translator Mikhail Bakunin, in which they explain the situation to the three. Sun and Mikhail go to the bank to get more money, and Keamy and Omar trap Jin in the freezer. When Sayid arrives, he kills Keamy and his men (including Omar), and help Jin escape. When Sun and Mikhail arrive, Jin kills Mikhail, but injures Sun in the process. Sun then confesses that she is pregnant. Sun eventually recovers at the hospital, and the baby is safe. When Juliet, their doctor does an ultrasound on their baby, they remember moments from the original timeline, and they perfectly speak English and call their baby "Ji Yeon." They then unite with their friends from the original timeline in a church to move on.

== Development ==
Daniel Dae Kim described his audition as a "really interesting experience". He found it especially hard as it was his first time acting in Korean, and he hadn’t spoken in it regularly since being in high school, when he would talk to his parents.

Jin is the only major character who could not speak English before arriving on the island (though he does speak it in one of Hurley's dream sequences), and has been receiving tutelage from Sun and Sawyer. Ironically, Daniel Dae Kim has the opposite problem: though he was born in South Korea, he speaks English as his native language (having been raised in Pennsylvania) and had to get tutoring in Korean to prepare for the role. Despite Jin's inability to speak English, he can understand it better than most characters think, deducing that Sun and Sayid are lying to him in "The Glass Ballerina". He manages only rudimentary English by the end of season three, but by the end of season four, he can understand most of what is said to him, and can speak English with minimal difficulty. Furthermore, after living for three years on the island, as shown in the episode "LaFleur", he speaks English fluently, albeit with an accent.

Military service for a minimum of twenty-one months is compulsory in South Korea. This, in addition to Jin's mob experience, may explain his familiarity with handguns as seen in "The Glass Ballerina" and "Through the Looking Glass."

== Character naming ==
Similarly to the Chinese and Japanese naming system, the convention in the Korean naming system is to put the family name first in the person's name. Therefore, Jin's name should technically be Kwon Jin-Soo (권진수), rather than Jin-Soo Kwon. However, when his name is spoken in the Korean flashbacks, it is said in the Korean manner.
