= Boone Carlyle =

Fictional character from the American television series Lost

- Lost character
- Ian Somerhalder as Boone Carlyle
- First appearance: "Pilot (Part 1)"
- Last appearance: "The End"
- Created by: Jeffrey Lieber; J. J. Abrams; Damon Lindelof
- Portrayed by: Ian Somerhalder
- Centric episode(s): "Hearts and Minds"

In-universe information
- Full name: Boone Carlyle
- Species: Human
- Gender: Male
- Occupation: COO of a wedding company, lifeguard
- Relatives: Shannon Rutherford (Stepsister)
- Nationality: American
- Former residence: Malibu, California, United States

Boone Carlyle is a fictional character played by Ian Somerhalder on the ABC drama television series Lost, which chronicles the lives of the survivors of a plane crash in the south Pacific. Boone is introduced in the pilot episode as the stepbrother of fellow crash survivor Shannon Rutherford. He tries to contribute as much as he can to the safety of the castaways and eventually becomes John Locke's protégé.

Unlike many other characters of the first season, who were rewritten based on their actors, Boone was largely the same through production. Somerhalder did not want to shoot a pilot; however, he jumped at the opportunity once he found out he would be working with co-creator/executive producer J. J. Abrams. The character was generally well received by critics and fans; USA Today described Boone as a "callow, privileged young man striving for maturity."

== Appearances ==
=== Before the crash ===
Boone is born in October 1981, the son of wealthy Sabrina Carlyle, the head of a wedding company. When Boone is ten years old, Sabrina marries Adam Rutherford, who has an eight-year-old daughter named Shannon. When Boone is twenty years old, he becomes the chief operating officer of his mother's business in New York City. Boone harbors a fondness for his stepsister, which develops into a romantic attraction. When Boone learns of Shannon's financial difficulties after her father's death, he offers to give her money, but she does not accept. Boone "rescues" Shannon several times from abusive relationships by paying the boyfriends to leave her. One such rescue attempt leads Boone to Sydney, Australia in September 2004, where he learns the relationships are actually scams concocted by Shannon to get his money and attention. Boone is deeply hurt by the deception. Boone and Shannon have sex after her Australian boyfriend runs away with her money. The next day, they board Oceanic Airlines Flight 815 to return to the United States.

=== On the island ===
Boone unsuccessfully tries to perform CPR on an unconscious Rose Henderson, which he claims to have learned when he was a lifeguard. Boone maintains a generally helpful attitude and remains protective of Shannon (his sister), although he criticizes her for her affectedness. His protective attitude combines with jealousy when she develops feelings for Sayid Jarrah, and Boone unsuccessfully attempts to discourage the relationship.

Boone is drawn to the hunting and survival skills of John Locke, a fellow castaway. He becomes Locke's apprentice and begins to distance himself from the other survivors. Boone and Locke find a metal hatch while tracking the kidnapped Claire Littleton and Charlie Pace. The two excavate the hatch, keeping its existence a secret from the other survivors. Locke subjects Boone to a hallucinatory exercise on their twenty-fourth day on the island, allowing Boone to resolve his feelings for Shannon, in which Boone sees Shannon after she is killed by the monster. Forty-one days after the crash, Boone and Locke discover a heroin runner's Beechcraft plane stuck high in a tree canopy. Boone climbs up into the aircraft and finds a working radio in the cockpit, which he uses to transmit a mayday signal. He receives a response to his message from a man, later revealed to be Bernard Nadler of the tail-section survivors, but the aircraft unbalances and falls nose-first to the ground. Boone sustains severe injuries and, despite Jack's attempts to treat him, dies on November 2, 2004. Boone tries to pass a message to Shannon through Jack, but dies before he is able to finish the sentence. Somerhalder said the news of his character's death—the first death of a major character on the series—was "pretty devastating."

Almost four weeks later, Locke experiences a self-induced hallucination, in which a longer-haired Boone appears and pushes Locke around in a wheelchair in an imaginary Sydney International Airport, with the other survivors present but acting in different roles. Boone tells Locke someone in the airport is in serious danger. Close to the end of the hallucination, Locke finds Eko's stick covered in blood and Boone appears bloody and injured. He tells Locke, "They've got him. You don't have much time." In the Oceanic Six's cover story, Boone survived the initial crash but soon died of internal injuries.

=== In the alternate timeline ===
In the alternate timeline, Shannon does not go back with Boone. In "LA X", Boone goes back alone on Flight 815 and sits beside Locke, who tells him about going on a walkabout in Australia. In a parallel with the island timeline, Boone tells Locke that if they crashed, he would follow him. Once the plane lands, Boone shakes Locke's hand and exits the plane. Boone reappears in the final episode of Lost. In "The End", we see Hurley and Sayid talking in a car on a dark street, then witnessing a thug beating up Boone outside a bar. Shannon shouts, "Leave my brother alone," and Sayid gets out of the car to intervene. His and Shannon's memories are restored the moment they touch. Boone, having conspired with Hurley to bring Shannon and Sayid together, wanders over to the car. He jokes with Hurley about how he had to take a beating and adds sarcastically, "Thanks for taking your time." He also comments how difficult it was to get Shannon to return from Australia with him, but he and Hurley agree the effort was worth it to have her and Sayid's memories restored. Boone is one of the first people Jack greets in the church where everyone reunites to move on to the afterlife together.

== Characteristics ==
USA Today described Boone as "a callow young man who had been toughened by island challenges." Variety called him "hot-headed", while Entertainment Weekly wrote he was "even-tempered". Boone's quick decisions with good intentions are often rash. On his sixth day on the island, Joanna Miller drowns. As soon as he finds out she is drowning, he immediately tries to save her, although he does not succeed and almost becomes a casualty himself. While trying to take on a leadership role, Boone steals the camp's water; however, his plan backfires and the survivors turn on him. When Boone suspects Sawyer has Shannon's medicine, he attempts to steal it. Aside from Shannon, he is closest to John Locke, who acts as a father figure and mentor to the younger, inexperienced Boone and who, unlike others including Shannon, tries to help him do his part on the island. Boone similarly is one of the few to trust Locke's guidance and make Locke feel like the hero he has always wanted to be. Boone reflects aspects of Locke's personality, such as his desire to have a unique purpose and his willingness to believe in the unlikely.

Boone always offers to help his fellow survivors: joining the party trying to send a radio distress call on the second day, helping Sayid triangulate Danielle Rousseau's distress signal on the eighth day, searching for the abducted Claire Littleton on the sixteenth day, and standing guard for the return of Ethan Rom on the twenty-eighth day. IGN wrote that he "appeared to be both integral and counterproductive to their survival" and to be "a pure and honest guy who tried to help people on the island and attempted to carry his own weight among the seemingly-unscathed survivors of Oceanic Flight 815."

== Development ==
Unlike many other characters of the first season, who were rewritten based on their actors, Boone was largely the same through production. He was originally going to be named Boone Anthony Markham V, going by the nickname "Five." In the script for the pilot, the writers ran a search and replace to change Boone's name so when Jack counted to five, the script read, "One, two, three, four, Boone." Somerhalder did not want to shoot a pilot; however, he jumped at the opportunity once he found out he would be working with co-creator/executive producer J. J. Abrams. Somerhalder was paid between $20,000 and $40,000 an episode, initially received the third highest billing in the credits, before the producers decided to list the main cast alphabetically.

Boone appears in a total of twenty-five episodes, and his voice is heard in a twenty-sixth episode. He physically appears in three episodes after the first season with the credit of "special guest star." He returns for the flashbacks of Shannon, Nikki Fernandez and Paulo and Locke's hallucination. In Nikki's third season flashback, the producers did not ask Somerhalder to cut his hair for two days of work and had him wear a wig, making his hair noticeably longer than it should have been. There is some confusion over the spelling of Boone's last name: while "Carlyle" appears on Boone's checkbook and grave, "Carlisle" appears on the subtitles for "Hearts and Minds."

In the original outline of the eleventh episode, Locke was to be accompanied by two guest characters to search for Claire and discover the Hatch. In the final product, Boone accompanies Locke, a choice leading to Boone's death. While the executive producers have stated Somerhalder took the news of his character's death professionally, Somerhalder has said he found it "pretty devastating." Boone's death is notable as the first death of a major character on the series. According to executive producers Damon Lindelof and Carlton Cuse, Boone's death made sense from a story perspective to fuel the rivalry between Jack and Locke and lead to the events in the season finale. Following Somerhalder's departure from the show, ABC signed him to another one-year contract. Somerhalder stated being a part of Lost was "the greatest experience" of "the greatest year of his life."

== Reception ==
BuddyTV called Boone a fan "favorite." After three episodes had aired, an article in USA Today called Somerhalder "camera-friendly." A poll was run by ComingSoon.net in spring 2005 on the favorite of the fourteen main Lost characters, in which Boone placed seventh with 4.3% of over 2000 votes. After his death, a TV Guide critic wrote she misses Boone's "very pretty eyes." IGN ranked Boone as the tenth best character of the first three seasons of Lost.

Somerhalder co-won the 2005 Screen Actors Guild Award for "Best Ensemble – Drama Series". He was also nominated in the category of "TV: Choice Breakout Performance – Male" in the 2005 Teen Choice Awards, but lost to Desperate Housewives' Jesse Metcalfe. While starring on Lost, Somerhalder was voted one of "20 Teens Who Will Change the World" by Teen People, despite being 26 years old at the time. Teen People also called him "the next Johnny Depp." He placed ninth on TV Guide's "Top Ten Hunks" list.
