= Two for the Road (Lost) =

- Lost episode
- Michael Dawson (Harold Perrineau) after shooting Ana Lucia (Michelle Rodriguez) and Libby (Cynthia Watros).
- Episode no.: Season 2 Episode 20
- Directed by: Paul Edwards
- Written by: Elizabeth Sarnoff; Christina M. Kim
- Production code: 220
- Original air date: May 3, 2006
- Running time: 43 minutes

Guest appearances
- John Terry as Christian Shephard; Rachel Ticotin as Teresa Cortez; Gabrielle Fitzpatrick as Lindsey Littleton; Michael Emerson as Henry Gale

Episode chronology
← Previous "S.O.S."	Next → "?"
- Lost season 2

"Two for the Road" is the 20th episode of the second season of the American drama television series Lost, and the show's 45th episode overall. The episode was written by supervising producer Elizabeth Sarnoff and producer Christina M. Kim, and directed by Paul Edwards. It first aired in the United States on May 3, 2006, on the American Broadcasting Company. In the episode, flashbacks reveal more about Ana Lucia's past, while in present time, Ana Lucia tries to get a gun to kill Henry, and Michael returns to the rest of the survivors.

"Two for the Road" was generally well-received by critics who were shocked that Ana Lucia and Libby were killed off. The actresses Michelle Rodriguez and Cynthia Watros had widely publicized drunk driving charges several months before the airing of the episode, but the producers later claimed in several interviews that the deaths had been planned for over a year. The episode was watched by 15.03 million American viewers, which represented a decrease compared to the previous year's rating. Sarnoff and Kim were nominated for the Writers Guild of America (WGA) Award for Best Episodic Drama for writing the episode.

== Plot ==
=== Flashbacks ===
Flashbacks begin directly after Ana Lucia Cortez (Michelle Rodriguez) shooting Jason (Aaron Gold) in "Collision". Upon arriving at the police station the following day, Ana Lucia's mother Teresa Cortez (Rachel Ticotin) is suspicious of her daughter and questions her, causing Ana Lucia to quit the police department. While working at an airport, she meets Christian Shephard (John Terry) who hires her as a bodyguard for his trip to Australia. One night, Ana Lucia and a drunk Christian go to a home, where Christian demands to see his daughter from a blonde woman (Gabrielle Fitzpatrick). After seeing that the argument is getting out of control, Ana intervenes and pulls Christian back into the car. Ana Lucia eventually gets tired of Christian's antics and leaves him at a bar, where they briefly encounter Sawyer when Christian opens his car door. Ana goes to the airport, about to board Flight 815 and calls her mother, apologizing and telling her that she wishes to make things right. Teresa says she will be waiting for Ana Lucia in Los Angeles.

=== On the Island ===
In the present, Ana Lucia starts questioning Henry Gale in the hatch, but suddenly he attacks her, and is only stopped when John Locke (Terry O'Quinn) knocks him unconscious. Locke asks Henry why he attacked Ana Lucia, but has never tried to hurt him. Henry says that Locke is "one of the good ones". Although Libby (Cynthia Watros) advises Ana Lucia not to try to get revenge on Henry, she is determined and asks James "Sawyer" Ford (Josh Holloway) for a gun, but is rejected. Ana Lucia returns and after Sawyer still refuses to give her a gun, she has sex with him, and is able to distract him long enough to steal the gun. Jack Shephard (Matthew Fox) and Kate Austen (Evangeline Lilly) return with Michael Dawson (Harold Perrineau). Michael wakes up and tells everyone in the hatch that he tracked the Others down and found out that they are living worse off than the survivors. He also says that once he is healthy, he will organize a rescue mission to reclaim his son Walt Lloyd (Malcolm David Kelley). After Locke and Jack begin to plan a rescue mission for Walt, they realize that they need more guns, and go to Sawyer, who realizes that Ana Lucia has stolen his. Elsewhere, Hugo "Hurley" Reyes (Jorge Garcia) has planned a romantic picnic for himself and Libby, but Hurley gets lost and leads them back to the survivors' beach. There, he realizes that he forgot to pack a blanket and Libby offers to go back to the hatch to retrieve one. She also suggests that Hurley ask Rose and Bernard for some wine for the picnic, a suggestion that Hurley is delighted to hear. Meanwhile, back in the hatch, Michael asks Ana Lucia what is going on and she explains a few things: Sawyer has all the guns, Jack, Locke, and Kate left to get the guns, and they currently have one of the Others, Henry, in captivity inside the armory. She mentions that Henry tried to kill her earlier in the day and that although she was about to kill Henry, she was not able to pull the trigger. Michael offers to do it, but after she hands him the gun he turns around and shoots her dead. Libby walks in with the blankets and startles Michael causing him to shoot her too. Michael then walks into the armory where Henry is being held. Instead of shooting Henry, Michael shoots himself in the arm.

== Production ==
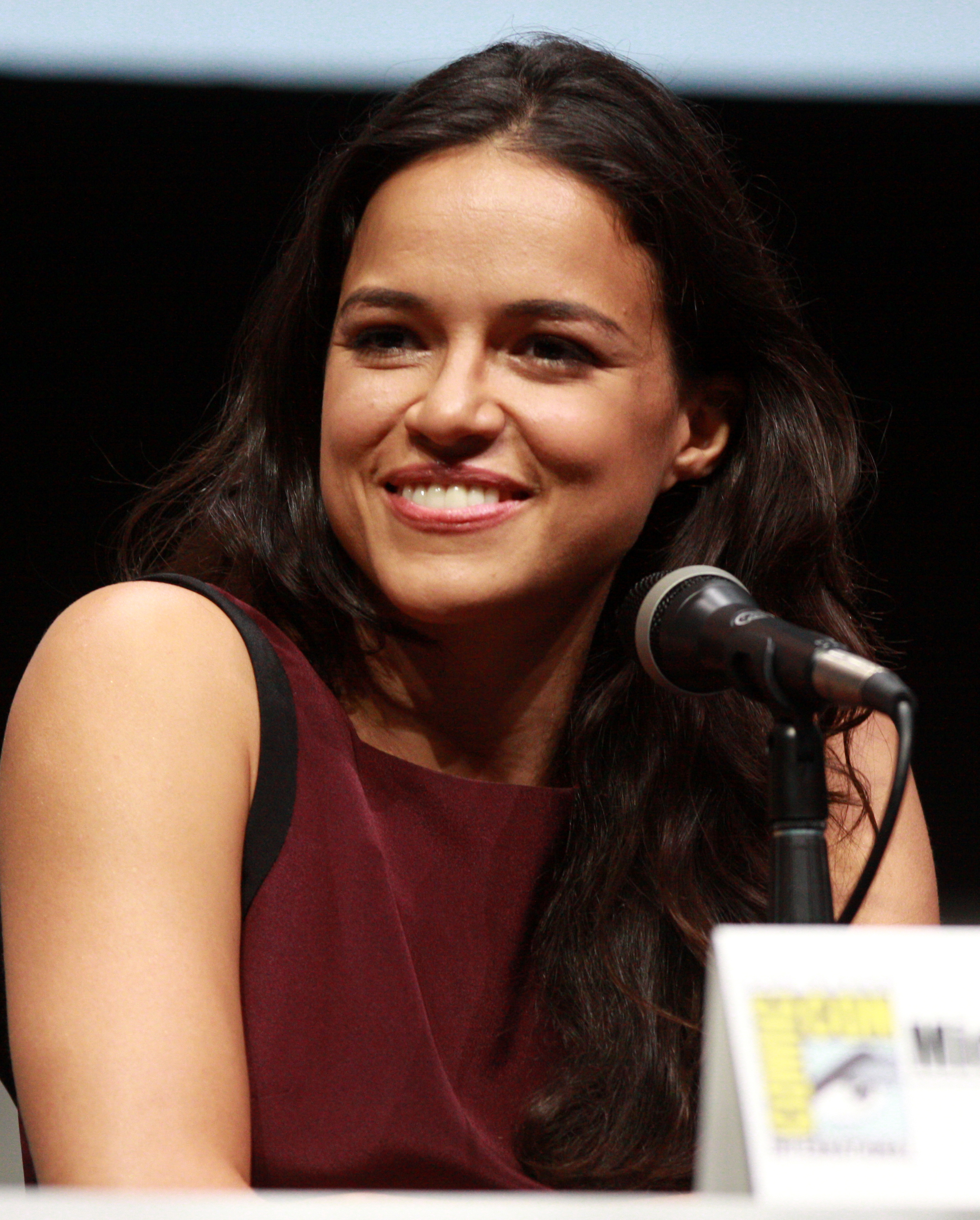
Producers denied rumors that Ana Lucia was killed off because of Michelle Rodriguez's behavior.

=== Filming ===
"Two for the Road" was the second episode of the series directed by Paul Edwards. Edwards had previously directed the episode "What Kate Did".

Numerous locations on Oahu were used as filming locations for the episode. The rooftop on Dole Cannery was filmed as the Los Angeles Police Department rooftop. The kitchen of Hawaii Convention Center was altered so that the Lost cast and crew could use it as a morgue, the Convention Center was also used for the airport scenes. The bar that Christian Shephard went to in the flashbacks is actually the Fisherman's Wharf restaurant at Kewalo Basin Harbor. The scene at Ana Lucia's hotel room was filmed at the Renaissance Ilikai Waikiki Hotel. The scenes on the beach were shot at Oahu's Papa'iloa Beach as usual.

=== Casting ===
The deaths of Ana Lucia and Libby caused speculation that they were killed off due to the DUIs that actresses Michelle Rodriguez and Cynthia Watros received within fifteen minutes of each other on December 1, 2005. Watros pleaded guilty, was fined $370, and had her license suspended for 90 days. Rodriguez initially pleaded innocent, but in April 2006 pleaded guilty, and was sentenced to five days in Oahu correctional facility in May (she ended up serving only 65 hours due to jail overcrowding).

In February 2006, US Weekly claimed that an insider told them that the Lost producers were frustrated with Rodriguez's behavior and were going to kill her character off. In 2023, Maureen Ryan reported various allegations of co-showrunners Damon Lindelof and Carlton Cuse fostering a toxic work environment. Several sources, including a member of the writing staff for the second season, corroborated claims of Rodriguez's firing due to her December 2005 arrest. The writers' room also hung up the actresses' mugshots on the walls to mock their circumstances.

After "Two for the Road" initially aired in May 2006, writers Damon Lindelof and Carlton Cuse told TV Guide that when talking to Rodriguez about the part of Ana Lucia, she said that she would be interested, but only for a year. After sitting down with her, the two were very impressed with her energy, and decided to adjust their plan to make her character only last one season. Later, in a 2020 podcast, Lindelof amended this and revealed Rodriguez expressed interest in continuing the role beyond her one-season deal midway through the season (shortly following the DUI charges), but he informed her they had already planned her death storyline. However, in a December 2006 interview, Rodriguez previously stated she was informed two weeks before they shot the episode that her character was being killed off. She remarked how hard it was to keep it from the cast who were discussing their storylines next season for the two week interval.

Lindelof made a claim of recalling that after they found out both Rodriguez and Watros got DUIs, he expressed concern that it would look like killing Ana and Libby was the producers attempt to say "Don't drive drunk!", and even considered re-writing the script so it wouldn't seem that way, but the producers decided just to keep it like it was. Lindelof also denied rumors that Rodriguez was killed off because she was hard to deal with, saying that Michelle was "totally professional and got along well with all the other actors". According to Lindelof and Cuse, Watros was very sad about Libby being killed off, and the producers felt bad for her, so they helped her get in a pilot for a show on CBS called My Ex-Life, although it was not picked up by the network.

=== Writing ===
The episode was written by Elizabeth Sarnoff and Christina M. Kim, the third episode that the two had written together. In an early version of the script, Ana Lucia and Kate share an awkward but friendly scene. This was appropriated from a deleted scene between Libby and Claire (Emilie de Ravin). The concept was scrapped yet again. It was eventually able to be re-worked as an interaction between Kate and Alex Rousseau (Tania Raymonde) regarding Alex's dress in the third season episode, "The Glass Ballerina".

Audience reception to Ana Lucia was unfavorable so they justified killing Libby alongside Ana Lucia to elicit sympathy. However, Rodriguez's character was designed from the beginning as a "love-to-hate character", as Cuse remarked in a November 2005 podcast. Lindelof further described the character's intentional role as a "persona non grata in our society for some time to come" as a result of Shannon (Maggie Grace)'s death and becoming integrated into the fuselage camp.

By the time they chose to write Rodriguez's character off, the producers had also scrapped plans for her character's romantic storyline with Jack (Matthew Fox) as part of a love rectangle with Kate and Sawyer. They attempted to rework the storyline with Juliet (Elizabeth Mitchell), though after "The Other Woman", Lindelof felt the relationship was contrived and ended it as well.

The producers initially planned to bring Watros back as a recurring guest star, to tell Libby's story in a mysterious, posthumous way. However, after fulfilling her contractual obligations, Watros did not recur in subsequent seasons. The resolution to her storyline was scrapped in the fourth season due to the 2007–08 Writers Guild of America strike, where she was initially scheduled to make two further appearances after one guest stint as an apparition. Purported scheduling conflicts also prevented her return in the fifth season.

Watros was available for and returned for the sixth and final season for two episodes (the equivalent of the remaining episodes she was initially contracted to return for in Season 4 before the strike). Albeit, her role reprisal was in non-standard form. Due to the "alternate timeline" premise of the sixth season (later revealed to be the characters' "bardo" awakenings), the flashback format had been discarded, which meant her character's backstory was never resolved following Libby's death, after being shot in "Two for the Road".

== Reception ==
"Two for the Road" was viewed by 15.03 million American viewers, which was 1.5 million fewer than the ratings compared to the previous year. The episode received generally positive reviews from critics. TV Squad's C. K. Sample wrote that "Two for the Road" was "a great episode that I thoroughly enjoyed", although he did feel "badly for Sawyer and Hugo". Sample also wrote that although he suspected that Ana-Lucia and Libby were going to die, he thought what "was amazing was who shot them". Mac Slocum of Filmfodder.com wrote that the episode contained the "Biggest ... twist ... ever." Slocum went on to say that if you had not seen the episode, "whoooeee [sic] are you in for a treat", and called the two murders "a doozy". Slocum called Ana Lucia "a drama queen". He also felt that Libby's death was "one of the most tragic things we've seen", and said that it was "equivalent to a nuclear weapon wiping out all the characters in the M*A*S*H finale. Television Without Pity graded the episode with a B+. Supervising producer Elizabeth Sarnoff and producer Christina M. Kim were nominated for the Writers Guild of America (WGA) Award for Best Episodic Drama at the February 2007 ceremony for writing the episode.
