= Three Minutes =

- Lost episode
- Episode no.: Season 2 Episode 22
- Directed by: Stephen Williams
- Written by: Edward Kitsis; Adam Horowitz
- Production code: 222
- Original air date: May 17, 2006
- Running time: 44 minutes

Guest appearances
- M. C. Gainey as Other; Michael Bowen as Danny Pickett; April Grace as Ms. Klugh; Tania Raymonde as Alex; Teddy Wells as Ivan; Dustin Geiger as Matthew

Episode chronology
← Previous "?"	Next → "Live Together, Die Alone"
- Lost season 2

"Three Minutes" is the 47th episode of Lost. It is the 22nd episode of the second season. The episode was directed by Stephen Williams, and written by Edward Kitsis and Adam Horowitz. It first aired May 17, 2006, on ABC. The emotionally conflicted character of Michael Dawson is featured in the episode's flashbacks. It also marks a transition for Mr. Eko, from his project of building a church, to his self-appointed role of entering the numbers in the computer.

== Plot ==
=== Flashbacks ===
Thirteen days ago, Michael asks Locke for a gun. Though Locke cooperates, Michael knocks him unconscious, and then heads to the computer to receive directions on how to find his son, Walt. Jack arrives unexpectedly; Michael confronts him and locks both him and Locke in the armory, before setting off to rescue Walt. En route he is captured by the Others and is taken to another location. He is then greeted by Mr. Friendly and various Others, shortly before the former's encounter with the survivors in "The Hunting Party". When alone with Michael, Alex tells him that Mr. Friendly is just sending them a message to scare them. She then asks Michael about Claire and her baby. Michael is dragged to the Others' camp, where they appear to live in makeshift tents. A woman identifying herself as "Ms. Klugh" asks questions about Walt's childhood. She eventually explains that she wants Michael to return to his camp to free Henry Gale. Michael demands to see Walt, and she agrees, giving him three minutes to talk. Michael is then reunited with his son. Walt informs Michael that they make him take "tests", and he cautions Michael that the Others are "not who they say they are". Ms. Klugh threatens Walt by telling him that he will be sent to "The Room" if he says anything revealing, and Walt is subsequently taken away after throwing himself at Michael, begging him to save him. Ms. Klugh tells Michael that he and Walt will be set free if he brings four people from his own camp to the Others. She gives him a slip of paper, which contains the names: Jack, Kate, "James Ford" (Sawyer), and Hurley. She states that Michael must bring his companions back if he is ever to see Walt again. Michael agrees, but also demands that he and Walt are given the boat in return.

=== On the island ===
Michael debates with the other survivors as to who should accompany him to the Others' camp. He does not tell them about his instructions, but insists on limiting the number to the names that were on the paper. When Sawyer informs Michael that he has recruited Sayid, Michael protests and directly tells Sayid that he is not coming. Michael also fails to convince Hurley to go, despite reminding him that Libby was killed. Sayid suspects that Michael has been "compromised" by the Others, and decides to work on a new plan with Jack to try to regain an advantage. On the beach, Charlie brings a DHARMA kit, containing a vaccine and a pneumatic injector, to Claire for her and Aaron to use. Later, Charlie struggles to construct the church, as Vincent approaches with a Virgin Mary statue, which contains heroin. Charlie follows Vincent back to Sawyer's hidden stash and discovers the other statues. Charlie decides to throw all of them into the ocean and Locke observes that Charlie has overcome his demons. During the funeral for Libby and Ana Lucia, while the survivors stand around their graves, Locke cuts away his splints and starts walking without crutches again. After saying a few words about Libby, Hurley tells a visibly relieved Michael that he is going to join his expedition to the Others' camp. At this point, the funeral is interrupted by Sun suddenly spotting a boat coming towards the island.

== Reception ==
14.67 million Americans watched the episode live. IGN ranked it as the 60th best episode, and noted that it was one of the few that took place entirely on the island, including the flashbacks.
