= A Tale of Two Cities (Lost) =

- Lost episode
- Episode no.: Season 3 Episode 1
- Directed by: Jack Bender
- Story by: Damon Lindelof
- Teleplay by: J. J. Abrams; Damon Lindelof
- Production code: 301
- Original air date: October 4, 2006
- Running time: 43 minutes

Guest appearances
- Julie Adams as Amelia; Blake Bashoff as Karl; Brett Cullen as Goodwin; M. C. Gainey as Tom Friendly; William Mapother as Ethan Rom; John Terry as Christian Shephard; Julie Bowen as Sarah; Stephen Semel as Adam; Alexandra Morgan as Moderator; Julie Ow as Nurse; Sonya Seng as Receptionist

Episode chronology
← Previous "Live Together, Die Alone"	Next → "The Glass Ballerina"
- Lost season 3

"A Tale of Two Cities" is the third season premiere, and 50th episode overall, of the American Broadcasting Company (ABC)'s serial drama television series Lost. The episode was written by co-creators/executive producers J. J. Abrams and Damon Lindelof, based on a story by Lindelof and directed by executive producer Jack Bender. The episode begins with the introduction of Juliet Burke (Elizabeth Mitchell) and The Barracks. The character of Jack Shephard (Matthew Fox) is featured in the episode's flashbacks. This is the only episode of the series other than the pilot to have been co-written by J. J. Abrams.

When the episode first aired on October 4, 2006, in the United States, it was watched by an average of 19 million American viewers, making it the fourth most watched episode of the week. It premiered to generally positive reviews, with many praising Mitchell's new character.

== Plot ==
=== Flashbacks ===
A woman (Juliet Burke; Elizabeth Mitchell) prepares for a book club meeting in a modern suburban home. The club is in a heated discussion of Stephen King's Carrie, when they are interrupted by what sounds like an earthquake. The group leaves Juliet's house and Ben Linus (Michael Emerson), previously known as "Henry Gale" to the survivors, appears along with Ethan Rom (William Mapother), looking up to watch Oceanic Flight 815 break apart in mid-air. Ben quickly orders Goodwin (Brett Cullen) and Ethan to join the survivors, stay undercover, and provide "lists in three days." The camera zooms out to reveal that the suburb is actually on the Island and is inhabited by The Others, while in the background the smoke trail of the midsection and tail section of Flight 815 can be seen.

In Jack's flashbacks, Jack is going through a divorce from his wife Sarah (Julie Bowen). He demands to know who she has been dating, but she refuses to tell him, so he spies on her and steals her cell phone. He proceeds to call every number in her phone, and his father Christian Shephard's (John Terry) cell phone rings. After following Christian to an Alcoholics Anonymous meeting, Jack accuses him of sleeping with his wife and physically attacks him. After Jack is arrested, Sarah pays his bail. She tells him she only spoke to Christian to get help for Jack, and also tells Jack that now he has "something to fix." She then leaves with an unidentified man, revealing Christian was never the other man.

=== On the Island ===
Back in the present, Kate Austen (Evangeline Lilly) wakes up on the floor of a locker room. Tom (M. C. Gainey) allows her to have a shower and afterwards, forces her to change into a dress, after which she is led to an elegant breakfast on the beach with Ben, who tells her to put on handcuffs before she can eat. She asks him why he is doing this, and he tells her that he wanted to give her something pleasant to remember, as the next two weeks will be "very unpleasant". James "Sawyer" Ford (Josh Holloway) wakes up in a cage in the jungle. A teenager, Karl (Blake Bashoff), in a nearby cage initially ignores Sawyer but then later expresses interest in Sawyer's camp and unlocks his cage then Sawyer's. However, they are both caught and Tom makes Karl, who is now beaten and bloody, apologize to Sawyer before taking the teen away. Sawyer figures out the mechanical puzzle in his cage required to receive food, though Tom says it "only took the bears two hours." Kate is then put in Karl's (now empty) cage.

Jack wakes up in a cell in the Hydra Station, where Juliet gently interrogates him. At one point Jack attacks her and attempts to escape, holding an improvised weapon at her throat. He orders her to open a door, but she refuses to comply, claiming that doing so would kill them both. Ben appears and agrees that opening the door will kill them all. Jack throws Juliet away, and then opens the door. As Ben dashes back through the door he came in, water starts rushing into the hallway. Juliet helps Jack struggle into an adjoining room, tells him to push a button which she had previously mentioned was for emergencies. He does so and she knocks him unconscious. When he awakes, she shows Jack a file which she says contains documents about his entire life. Juliet asks Jack if he has any questions about Sarah. After a pause, he asks, "Is she happy?" Juliet replies yes, and walks outside, and Ben congratulates her on a job well done.

== Production ==
=== Casting ===
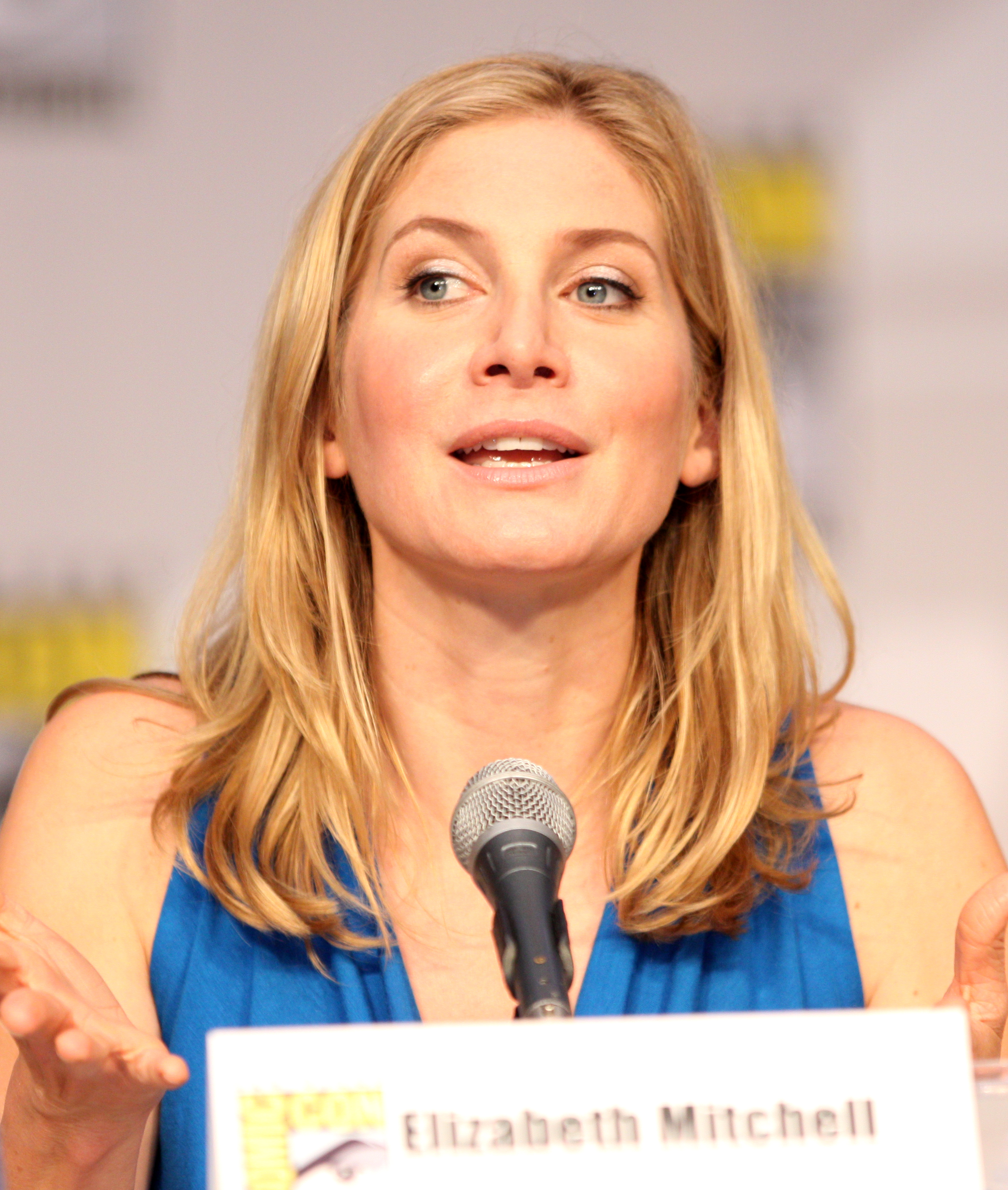
Actress Elizabeth Mitchell made her first appearance in the episode.

"A Tale of Two Cities" was the first episode to feature the character of Juliet. The actress who plays her, Elizabeth Mitchell, was cast in late July 2006 as a new series regular, who was meant to be a possible love interest for Jack. Mitchell has commented her first or second day of shooting was the opening sequence, when the Others watched Oceanic 815 fall out of the sky. When she first met actor Matthew Fox they briefly introduced themselves, but most of their initial conversation was in regard to the script and their characters. Mitchell found this helpful while shooting the premiere's scenes, since then they knew the other as their characters, and not as Matthew and Elizabeth. The scene in which Jack yells at Juliet, and she responds "No Jack, I think you're stubborn", was used as her audition scene. One of the Others, Amelia, was played by Julie Adams, who was the protagonist in Creature from the Black Lagoon.

Previous guest actors William Mapother, Julie Bowen, M. C. Gainey, Brett Cullen, and John Terry made brief appearances in the episode. The premiere marked the first appearances of recurring guest actor Blake Bashoff. In addition to Mitchell's new billing, only four other characters of star billing appeared in the episode: Michael Emerson, depicting Ben Linus, was promoted to a main character for the third season; the other three were Matthew Fox playing Jack Shephard, Evangeline Lilly as Kate Austen and Josh Holloway as Sawyer. Henry Ian Cusick was also promoted to a main character as Desmond Hume, along with new characters Nikki and Paulo, played by Kiele Sanchez and Rodrigo Santoro respectively. Malcolm David Kelley (Walt Lloyd), Harold Perrineau (Michael Dawson), Michelle Rodriguez (Ana Lucia Cortez), and Cynthia Watros (Libby) were no longer credited as main characters after each of their characters were written out at the end of the previous season.

=== Writing ===
Co-creators and executive producers Damon Lindelof and J. J. Abrams wrote the premiere's teleplay based upon a story by Lindelof. The episode was Abrams' first Lost writing credit since the pilot. They laid out the third season with the idea of "us versus them"; Carlton Cuse, a showrunner, explained, "And who is us? And who is them? I mean I think we all tend to objectify people who we don't know much about and I think that's the audience's view of The Others right now -- they are bad, they are the malevolent force on the island. But over the course of the stories we're going to be telling this season on the show we expect the audience's view of The Others to change a lot."

The opening sequence of the episode was meant to replicate the same idea of season 2's premiere "Man of Science, Man of Faith", where what seems to be a flashback is instead set on a new part of the island. Director Jack Bender questioned what Jack's goal was when he pulled on the chain, but Lindelof told him not to worry, because "Fox will sell it, and he did". Lindelof described when Jack attacks his father at the AA meeting as "pot-committed... it basically means you put so much money on the bluff, you can't fold your cards". The scene with Kate in a dress was inspired by Raiders of the Lost Ark, where Belloq gives a dress for Marion Ravenwood to wear, and was intended to make "tom-boyish" Kate feel vulnerable. The title, inspired by Charles Dickens' eponymous novel, refers to the reveal of another "city" on the island with the place where the Others live, in addition to the castaways' beach camp. The episode has only three characters of the second season's main cast, Jack, Kate and Sawyer. Lindelof later described this limited scope as "a mistake, when the audience is away from the show for that long, they want to see everybody", causing the following season openers to have scenes with most of the main characters.

In the episode, Tom tells Kate that she is not his type. This comment resulted in online discussion in regard to Tom's sexual orientation, and Lindelof and Cuse hinted that a Lost character would later be outed. Gainey joked, "if [Kate's] not your type, you're gay", and began playing the character as such. After the broadcast of "Meet Kevin Johnson", Lindelof and Cuse confirmed that the line from the third-season premiere is an allusion to Tom's sexuality, but felt that it needed to be explicitly confirmed in the show, although Lindelof noted that the confirmation scene in "Meet Kevin Johnson" "was not subtle, to say the least". The beginning of the episode featured a scene where Juliet and Amelia discuss Ben's feelings for Juliet, which was shot but deleted. This scene was later made into the twelfth "Lost: Missing Pieces" mobisode, "The Envelope".

=== Filming ===
The exterior of the Hydra was shot in an abandoned theme park, which art director Andrew Murdock thought it fit as a location for the "kind of blocky, 80's-style architecture", where everything was "aged, industrial, and a little bit larger, and a little bit unusual". The opening sequence features Petula Clark's "Downtown", a song that would later be used in another third-season episode featuring Juliet. Another song heard in the premiere, "Moonlight Serenade by Glenn Miller, was first used in the season two episode "The Long Con". Lindelof has stated the songs they choose for Lost were often inspired from his childhood, when his mother would vacuum to music on Sundays.

== Reception ==
On its original broadcast in the United States on ABC, the premiere was watched by an estimated 18.82 million viewers, making it the most watched episode of the night and the fourth most watched of the week. "A Tale of Two Cities" had four million less viewers than the previous season premiere. In Canada, the episode was watched by 1.972 million viewers on CTV, easily winning its timeslot. In the United Kingdom, "A Tale of Two Cities" was broadcast on November 22 along with follow-up "The Glass Ballerina" in Lost's first broadcast after changing to Sky1. With 1.549 million viewers, it was most watched program of the week on the non-terrestrial channels.

IGN's Chris Carabott rated the premiere 9/10, calling the "peek into the life of The Others... exceptionally done" and the non-appearance of the other survivors "a smart move". Carabott also praised Jack's flashbacks, writing "Previously, Jack has been written as the white knight and reluctant hero who everyone looked to in their time of need. The more chinks they show in Jack's armor, the better - the more human he becomes." He called "Juliet... a promising new character who will hopefully add a new dimension to The Others this season" and concluded his review by calling the episode "a solid season opener". Robert Bianco from USA Today praised the opening scene and called the episode "a fine start for a great series" but with reservations. Bianco wished Jack would "win one again for the team", and was fearful that Lost could eventually become like Alias, "a series that became so entranced by its puzzle and its villains that it let the main characters vanish behind them".

On a list of Lost episodes, the Los Angeles Times ranked "A Tale of Two Cities" number 66 out of 113 episodes, explaining it was "Not bad. The introduction of Juliet is a killer, and Jack raging against the Others is fun. But many of the big revelations -- Ben's name, for example -- aren't very well handled." On a similar list, IGN ranked the episode at number 38; they called the opening "one of the show's characteristic fake-outs", and Jack's flashbacks "not nearly as interesting as his first encounters with Juliet".

Matthew Fox submitted this episode for consideration for Outstanding Lead Actor in a Drama Series for the 59th Primetime Emmy Awards.
