= Further Instructions =

- Lost episode
- Episode no.: Season 3 Episode 3
- Directed by: Stephen Williams
- Written by: Carlton Cuse; Elizabeth Sarnoff
- Production code: 302
- Original air date: October 18, 2006
- Running time: 41 minutes

Guest appearances
- Ian Somerhalder as Boone Carlyle; Chris Mulkey as Mike; Virginia Morris as Jan; Justin Chatwin as Eddie Colburn; Joel Himelhoch as Sheriff Williams; Dion Donahue as Kim

Episode chronology
← Previous "The Glass Ballerina"	Next → "Every Man for Himself"
- Lost season 3

"Further Instructions" is the third episode of the third season of the American science fiction television series Lost. It first aired on October 18, 2006, on the American Broadcasting Company (ABC), making it the 52nd episode of the series. The episode was written by showrunner Carlton Cuse and supervising producer Elizabeth Sarnoff and was directed by Stephen Williams.

The series follows the survivors of the crash of a commercial passenger jet flying between Sydney and Los Angeles, on a mysterious tropical island somewhere in the South Pacific Ocean. In this episode, John Locke (Terry O'Quinn) recovers from the Hatch implosion and rescues Mr. Eko (Adewale Akinnuoye-Agbaje) from a polar bear. Locke is featured in the episode's flashbacks.

The episode featured the return of previous main cast member Ian Somerhalder. It also introduced the characters of Nikki and Paulo (Kiele Sanchez and Rodrigo Santoro), who were added in the wake of some criticism that the series focused too much on the same fifteen survivors. An estimated 16.31 million Americans watched the episode upon its original broadcast. "Further Instructions" received mixed to positive reviews from television critics.

== Plot ==
=== Flashbacks ===
Locke is a member of a commune in Humboldt County, California. He considers its members his new family. One day Locke picks up a young hitchhiker, named Eddie Colburn (Justin Chatwin), who tells him he is leaving home. Eddie joins the commune, but after six weeks, he asks Locke why he is never allowed to know what is going on in a greenhouse (into which he sees an exceptional amount of fertilizer going). Eddie expresses his discontent with being kept out of the secret and affirms to Locke his desire to be in on "whatever you guys are trying to blow up". Locke laughs and says he will talk to the commune leaders, Mike (Chris Mulkey) and Jan (Virginia Morris).

Upon entering the greenhouse some time later, in which marijuana is grown, Locke finds Mike and Jan in the midst of a frantic preparation to flee. They blame Locke for bringing Eddie, whom they have discovered is an undercover police officer. Locke promises to fix the situation. He takes Eddie hunting and holds Eddie at gunpoint. Eddie says that Locke was chosen because his psych profile said he would be "amenable for coercion". Eddie walks away, stating that Locke will not shoot him because he is "a good man," though Locke insists that he is a hunter, not a farmer.

=== On the Island ===
John Locke wakes up in the jungle and sees a naked Desmond Hume (Henry Ian Cusick) run by, but Locke cannot speak. Mr. Eko's (Adewale Akinnuoye-Agbaje) stick falls from above nearly hitting him. In the frame of Eko's church, he builds a sweat lodge and convinces Charlie Pace (Dominic Monaghan) to stand guard. Locke takes a hallucinogenic drug and enters the lodge in order to "speak with the Island". There, Boone Carlyle (Ian Somerhalder) appears to help him "find [his] way again, so that [he] can bring the family back together". Locke (mutely) apologizes for the day Boone died, and he accepts the apology, however, in a taunting and seemingly sarcastic manner. Locke's hallucination takes him to Sydney airport. Boone wheels Locke through the airport where he tells him someone is "in serious danger". Locke sees his fellow survivors, and is told by Boone that he must "clean up [his] own mess". Locke finds Eko's stick covered in blood and Boone tells him "they have him, you don't have much time". Upon exiting the sweat lodge he sees a flash of a polar bear. He recovers his ability to speak and tells Charlie that he is going to save Eko.

Locke and Charlie track Eko, whom Locke believes has been captured by a polar bear. They pause at a large pit in the ground where the hatch imploded. They encounter Hugo "Hurley" Reyes (Jorge Garcia), who tells them that Jack, Kate, and Sawyer were kidnapped by the Others, and that "Henry Gale" is their leader. While continuing back to the camp alone, Hurley finds Desmond naked and lends him a tie-dyed t-shirt. Desmond says the electromagnetic anomaly may have been destroyed, and Hurley questions why Desmond was not destroyed. Desmond mentions Locke's speech and his plan to save Jack Shephard, Kate Austen, and James "Sawyer" Ford. However, Hurley responds, "What speech?", as Locke has yet to give any such speech. Desmond seems confused, and drops the whole matter.

Locke finds the polar bear's cave and rescues Eko from the polar bear. While Charlie fetches water from a stream, Locke apologizes to an unconscious Eko for his lack of faith. Eko appears to briefly awaken and tells Locke that he must rescue Jack, Kate and Sawyer. Upon arriving at camp, Hurley informs the camp that Jack and the others have been captured. As an explanation, Locke announces to the survivors that he plans to rescue Jack, Kate, and Sawyer, as Desmond indicated to Hurley earlier. Hurley mentions to Charlie a sense of déjà vu.

== Production ==
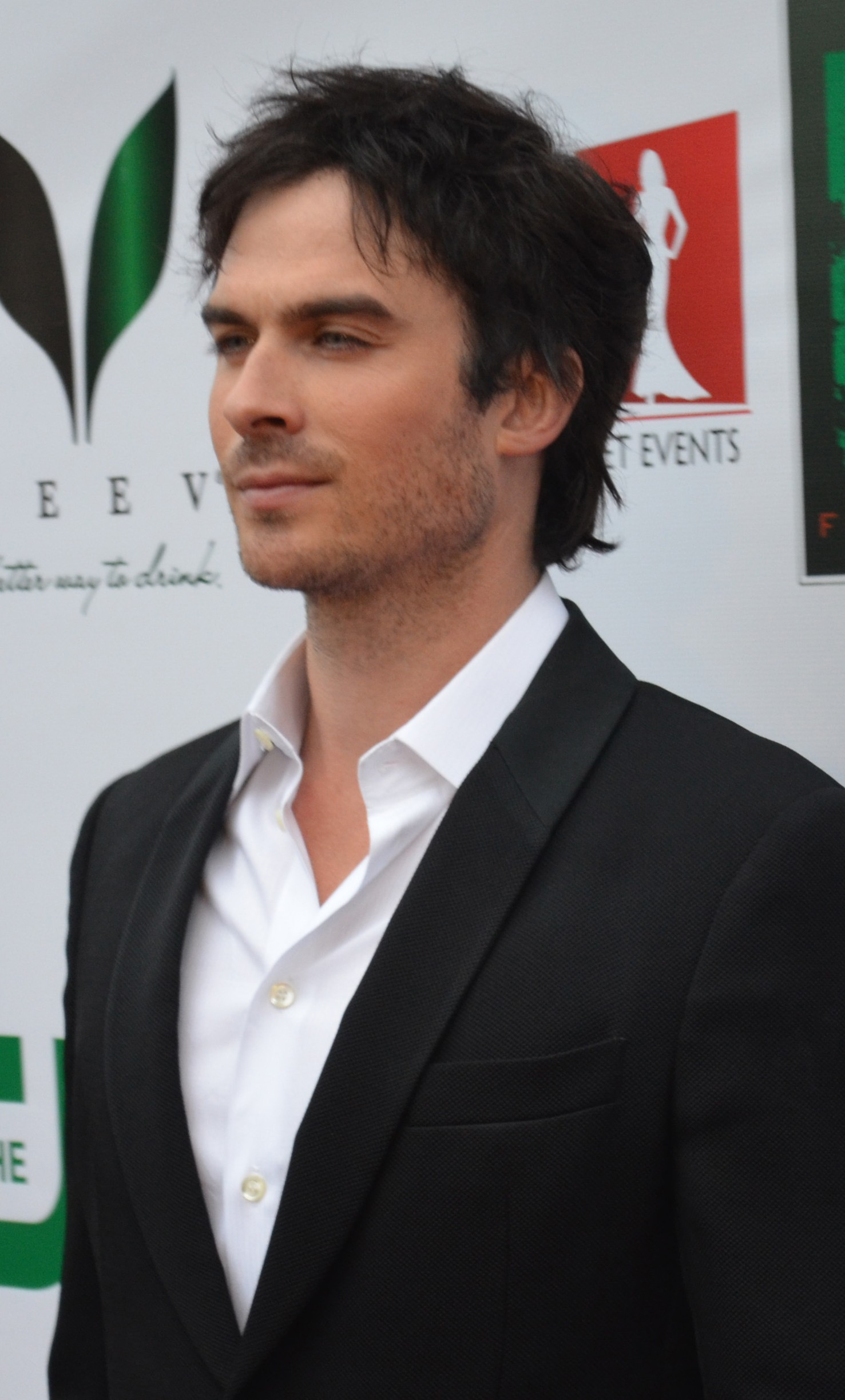
Actor Ian Somerhalder guest starred in "Further Instructions", his first appearance since the second season episode "Abandoned".

"Further Instructions" was written by showrunner Carlton Cuse and supervising producer Elizabeth Sarnoff; Stephen Williams served as the director. As the third episode of the season, "Further Instructions" was the first episode to feature the fate of the main cast camped on the beach, as well as the first to begin resolving the Hatch storyline from the season two finale. Leading up to the third season's broadcast, ABC attempted to reveal as few details as possible to the public. Ian Somerhalder's return was one piece of information that press releases included. Somerhalder, a former series regular, was credited as a guest actor to play his character Boone Carlyle in Locke's hallucinations, as his character died during the first season. Guest star Justin Chatwin made his first and only appearance in the episode. Other guest stars included Virginia Morris and Chris Mulkey as the commune leaders Jan and Milke, and Dion Donahue as Kim. The polar bear was mostly depicted by having stuntman Jonathan Arthur inside a bear suit.

Kiele Sanchez and Rodrigo Santoro make their first appearances as Nikki and Paulo in this episode. Prior to the third season, the producers of the show were often asked what the rest of the plane-crash survivors were doing because the show only focused on approximately fifteen of the survivors, and the characters of Nikki and Paulo were created in response. Reaction to the characters was generally negative because of their abrupt introduction onto the show. Nikki and Paulo's original introduction onto the show was deleted for time from the final cut of the episode. They were supposed to be accidentally found by Claire Littleton in Jack's tent having sex in the middle of the episode. They were instead introduced at the end of the episode when Locke makes a speech. The deleted scene was included on the third season DVD. The DVD also contained another deleted scene of Locke returning to the commune and seeing Mike and Jan getting arrested.

== Cultural references ==
Hurley worries that the Hatch implosion turned Desmond into the Hulk, a Marvel Comics character who turned large and green upon being exposed to Gamma rays. The Bible verses seen on Mr. Eko's stick include Romans 6:12, which says "Do not obey the lusts of sin" and John 3:5, which says "Jesus answered, 'I tell you the truth, no one can enter the kingdom of God unless he is born of water and the Spirit'." Hurley's numbers are also partially visible. Dominic Monaghan as his character Charlie, says, while trying to figure out who Locke needs to speak to: "Trees? Yea I heard they are wonderful conversationalists", a reference to Monaghan's work in The Lord of the Rings, in which he talks to Ents, tree- like beings.

== Reception ==
"Further Instructions" was originally scheduled to air October 11, 2006 as the second episode of the show's third season, but swapped with another Lost episode, "The Glass Ballerina". Upon its original broadcast on October 18, 2006 in the United States on the American Broadcasting Company (ABC), "Further Instructions" was watched live by an estimated 16.31 million viewers. In the 18-49 demographic, Lost received a 6.5/16 ratings share, helping ABC place first for the night when compared to the other major networks.

The episode has received mixed to positive reviews from television critics. Chris Carabott of IGN wrote that "Further Instructions" was "an entertaining hour of television. The episode certainly offers its fair share of excitement, but as with any typical Lost episode we are presented with more questions than answers". Carabott also called it an improvement over the preceding episode, "The Glass Ballerina." Andrew Dignan of Slant Magazine expressed relief in having Locke "back to the way we fondly remember him--as a wide-eyed, knife-wielding, face-smeared madman", but disliked his flashbacks, calling them a "largely under-developed affair". Dignan was also pleased to have Hurley back at the camp and referred to him as "someone [who] will keep the show grounded", but concluded his review by unhappily noting the sudden emergence of Nikki and Paulo as "a colossal misjudgment on the producers' part" and "a dangerous precedent that bears keeping an eye on."

Writing for Entertainment Weekly, Christine Fenno believed the episode had "false starts" but still "enjoyed the trippy places the writers took us." While disliking the initial scenes with Charlie and Locke, Fenno thought the episode "found its groove" after Locke entered into the trance, and called the final scene between Eddie and Locke the episode's "strongest moment." The Record gave a negative review, noting that "Unfortunately, 'Instructions' seemed devoid of everything that made 'The Glass Ballerina' hum. It was disjointed, it was graceless, and it seemed filled with gaping holes and not terribly helpful information." In a 2008 review, Ryan McGee of Zap2It gave the episode another negative review and considered it the weakest of the season's first three episodes. He explained that after watching it for a second time, it "just feels off to me in hindsight. Maybe it's the lack of forward movement, maybe it's the lackluster flashback, maybe because the central plot is rendered moot in just two more episodes...I can't quite say."
