= Every Man for Himself (Lost) =

- Lost episode
- Episode no.: Season 3 Episode 4
- Directed by: Stephen Williams
- Written by: Edward Kitsis; Adam Horowitz
- Cinematography by: Cort Fey
- Editing by: Mark J. Goldman
- Production code: 304
- Original air date: October 25, 2006
- Running time: 43 minutes

Guest appearances
- Michael Bowen as Danny Pickett; M. C. Gainey as Tom Friendly; Kim Dickens as Cassidy Phillips; Ian Gomez as Munson; Paula Malcomson as Colleen Pickett; Bill Duke as Warden Harris; Dorian Burns as Corrections officer; Dustin Geiger as Matthew; Ariston Green as Jason; Hunter Quinn as Prison tough; Peter Ruocco as Agent Freedman; Christina Simpkins as Munson's wife

Episode chronology
← Previous "Further Instructions"	Next → "The Cost of Living"
- Lost season 3

"Every Man for Himself" is the fourth episode of the third season of the American drama television series Lost, and the 53rd episode overall. It was directed by Stephen Williams and written by Edward Kitsis and Adam Horowitz. It first aired on ABC in the United States on October 25, 2006. The character of Sawyer (Josh Holloway) is featured in the episode's flashbacks; on the island, his rebellious attitude causes Ben Linus (Michael Emerson) and the Others to conjure a plan to keep him in check.

"Every Man for Himself" was intended to show how Ben was a character that could manipulate even the best confidence man on the island, and if Sawyer could care for another person, as Kate Austen (Evangeline Lilly) is making her attempts to escape captivity. When the episode first aired, it was watched by 17.09 million American viewers. Reviews were polarized; some critics praised the writing and the cliffhanger ending, while others deemed the episode repetitive and the "outright stinker" of season 3's early episodes.

== Plot ==
=== Flashbacks ===
Sawyer is in prison, trying to befriend Munson (Ian Gomez), a man who has hidden ten million dollars. He warns Munson that the warden (Bill Duke) is trying to con him out of his money. Eventually, Munson, worried that his wife will find where he has hidden the money, enlists Sawyer's help in moving the stash. Sawyer then reveals this information to the warden in exchange for a reduced sentence and a part of the money, which he puts in a bank account for Clementine Phillips, a baby that previous con victim Cassidy Phillips (Kim Dickens) has told him is his daughter. The warden sarcastically congratulates Sawyer on lying and cheating his way out of prison.

=== At Hydra Island ===
As Kate Austen (Evangeline Lilly) and Sawyer watch, the Others carry a critically injured Colleen (Paula Malcomson), who was shot by Sun-Hwa Kwon (Yunjin Kim) the night before. Sawyer realizes that the injury was inflicted by someone back at camp, and then devises a plan to break out from the cage; he intends to electrocute an off-guard Danny Pickett (Michael Bowen) using a puddle he created outside his cage. However, Ben Linus (Michael Emerson) overhears him via surveillance and switches off the electricity prior to visiting him. When Sawyer attempts to carry out his plan, Ben knocks him unconscious and has him carried into the Hydra station.

Sawyer wakes up to find himself strapped to a table, where Ben, Tom (M. C. Gainey) and two other Others watch over him. Sawyer is gagged before having a large hypodermic needle inserted into his chest. When Sawyer awakens, Ben and Tom come in, Tom carrying a rabbit in a cage; he shakes the cage vigorously, causing the rabbit to suddenly collapse, presumably dead. Ben informs Sawyer that they fitted him, like the rabbit, with a modified pacemaker; should his heart rate reach 140, his heart would explode. Ben threatens to implant one in Kate if Sawyer should tell her of his ordeal.

Meanwhile, Juliet Burke (Elizabeth Mitchell) begs Jack Shephard (Matthew Fox) to help operate on Colleen. Upon arriving at the operating theatre, Jack notices some x-rays, but Juliet informs him that they are not Colleen's. During the surgery, Jack tries to save Colleen, but she eventually dies. Later, Jack informs Juliet that there was nothing they could do with Colleen, and then asks about the x-rays, which Jack knows belong to a 40-year-old man with a very large spinal tumor, and asks whom he is there to save.

Danny, aware that the Oceanic Flight 815 survivors are responsible, takes his anger out on Sawyer by violently beating him; Sawyer refrains from fighting back. Kate pleads with him to stop; Danny ceases only after Kate admits to loving Sawyer. Afterwards, Kate notices a gap in her cage, and manages to climb through. She tries to free Sawyer, but he bitterly refuses, remembering Karl's escape and bloody capture. Kate returns to her cage, insisting that she would not abandon him, and tells Sawyer that she lied about loving him so that Danny would stop.

The next day, Ben takes Sawyer for a walk to high ground. Sawyer learns that he has no pacemaker; it was merely a con to prevent Sawyer from leaving, and Ben shows him the same rabbit from the day before, which had been merely sedated. Ben reveals to Sawyer that they are on a completely different island approximately twice the size of Alcatraz that overlooks the main island; escape is impossible. Upon asking why he was conned, Ben tells Sawyer that in order to gain a con artist's respect, he must be conned himself.

=== At the beach ===
Desmond Hume (Henry Ian Cusick) offers to fix Claire Littleton's (Emilie de Ravin) roof, but takes it back after Charlie Pace (Dominic Monaghan) offers to do this himself. Desmond then uses one of Paulo's (Rodrigo Santoro) golf clubs to build a lightning rod next to Claire's hut. As a storm brews, waking up Aaron, lightning strikes the golf club instead of Claire's hut. Charlie looks on in amazement, as, again, Desmond seemed to have had a glimpse of the future.

== Production ==
Leading up to the episode's broadcast, showrunner Damon Lindelof asked in an interview, "Until now, Sawyer's been the No. 1 con man on the island. What happens when he meets his match?" Fellow showrunner Carlton Cuse added "Is he willing to put himself out there emotionally for another human being?". Evangeline Lilly described the scene where Kate declines to escape as a major moment to the character, saying that "due to this hillbilly she's capable of returning to her cage." Josh Holloway agreed, declaring that the episode revealed to Sawyer that "not everyone is evil". The flashbacks were shot in an actual penitentiary, the Halawa Correctional Facility, which had been previously used for the prison where Desmond was incarcerated in "Live Together, Die Alone". While some of the interns were portrayed by extras with soy ink tattoos, bikers with actual body paint were also used.

Referring to the scene in which Ben seemingly fits Sawyer with a lethal pacemaker, Michael Emerson comments

Sadistic may be the word, but he doesn't seem to take much relish in it. He's just sort of detached, he looks at it coldly. I sometimes feel like everything to him is a sort of scientific experiment and he is interested in a dispassionate way in how the experiment runs its course. I think some day if we ever find out what his parentage is, that his parents were people of science.

He also described the events as a demonstration that "Ben has more cards than you think; ... he's a step or two ahead, one layer or two deeper than anyone else who is playing the game". The rabbit was a reference to Stephen King's On Writing, where King uses a rabbit in a cage with the number 8 written on its back as an example for the connection between reader and writer. Emerson said that part of the appeal of the scene was that "bunnies look so innocent, and the audience feels so tenderly about them you can feel nothing but beastly being mean to them". But Emerson added the rabbit in the scene had problems reacting to his attempts to scare him – "it was unfazed, it barely blinked". When asked in an interview whether she got sick of shooting on the Hydra holding cell set, Elizabeth Mitchell responded

I guess so. It was creepy because it was supposed to be underwater, so it was a little bit dingy but kind of great at the same time ... what I will miss is just being one on one with another actor. And then also one on two obviously when it was Michael [Emerson] because the three of us, it was almost like being on stage. We were able to really work off of each other and I thought you don't usually get that in a TV show.

== Reception ==
This episode attracted 17.087 million American viewers, standing as the seventh most watched program of the week.

IGN's Chris Carabott said that "now that Lost has finally wrapped up most of the loose ends from season two, the episode can shift focus to this season's mysteries." He also felt the episode "offers a healthy mix of plot and character development with a fair share of revelations thrown in for good measure." Christine Fenno of Entertainment Weekly declared herself "sold on the adrenaline-rush direction the show has taken", with praise to the flashbacks and the cliffhanger involving the reveal of the second island. Lost critic Andrew Dignan described "Every Man for Himself" as "quite the exhilarating episode, packing in enough thrills to make the 42-minutes fly by" in Slant Magazine. Ryan Mcgee of Zap2it considered "watching the con man get conned was brutally satisfying", saying that Sawyer "[ran] the whole gamut of emotions", and felt Colleen's death and the reveal of Ben's tumor "were good things, as people were already impatient by the glacial-like pace of Season 3." Writing for AOL TV, Jonathan Toomey considered "Every Man for Himself" as "an interesting episode" which set up many new elements, and while Toomey called the flashback "a little dry and 100% predictable", he liked how it related to the other events in the story "right up to the title". Mac Slocum of Filmfodder.com praised the episode for returning to the mythology, as he considered the previous episode lacked "the slack-jawed wonder I'm so accustomed to experiencing with this show". Daniel MacEachern of Television Without Pity gave the episode a grade of B−.

IGN ranked "Every Man for Himself" 70th out of all episodes of Lost, saying that it "offered plenty of food for thought." On the other hand, a similar list by Los Angeles Times ranked the episode as the tenth worst of the series, describing it as the "only outright stinker" of early season 3. Alan Sepinwall heavily criticized the episode for the repetitive and uninteresting storyline with the Others, though he praised Emerson's performance as Ben. Michael Emerson and Josh Holloway submitted this episode for consideration on their own behalf respectively in the category of "Outstanding Supporting Actor in a Drama Series" at the 2007 Emmy Awards, but neither was nominated.
