= The Other 48 Days =

- Lost episode
- Episode no.: Season 2 Episode 7
- Directed by: Eric Laneuville
- Written by: Damon Lindelof; Carlton Cuse
- Cinematography by: Michael Bonvillain
- Editing by: Mark J. Goldman
- Production code: 207
- Original air date: November 16, 2005
- Running time: 46 minutes

Guest appearances
- Sam Anderson as Bernard Nadler; Kimberley Joseph as Cindy Chandler; Brett Cullen as Goodwin; Josh Randall as Nathan; Glenn Lehmann as Donald; Kiersten Havelock as Emma; Mickey Graue as Zack; Jon T. Sakata as Man

Episode chronology
← Previous "Abandoned"	Next → "Collision"
- Lost season 2

"The Other 48 Days" is the seventh episode of the second season of the American drama television series Lost, and the 32nd episode overall. The episode was directed by Eric Laneuville, and written by executive producers Damon Lindelof and Carlton Cuse. It first aired on ABC in the United States on November 16, 2005.

Unlike in previous episodes, where the flashbacks focused on events leading up to the crash, "The Other 48 Days" centers around the backstory of the tail-section characters, showing the events leading up to "Abandoned". The episode was seen by an estimated 21.87 million American household viewers.

== Plot ==
After the tail section of the plane crashes into the water off the beach, the survivors swim ashore. Mr. Eko pulls a young girl (Emma) out of the water, and Ana Lucia Cortez performs CPR on her, saving her life. Ana and Eko then go to aid more people, leaving the girl and her brother in the care of Cindy Chandler. Libby helps a man, later to be identified as Donald, by setting his broken leg. A man runs out of the jungle asking for help, saying there's someone alive in the jungle. The man, "Goodwin", brings Ana to Bernard, who is still belted into his airplane seat, stuck up in a tree. Ana coaxes him to grab the tree branch, just before the seat crashes to the ground. Back on the beach, Goodwin, who claims to be in the Peace Corps, builds a signal fire.

That night, three of the adults are taken and Eko kills two of the "Others" with a rock when they try to take him. From that night on, he refuses to speak. Despite this incident, nobody organizes shifts to guard the group.

Three survivors die from injuries on the second through fourth day. A survivor who identifies himself as Nathan suggests staying on the beach, and the group does so. On the fifth day, Donald dies from the leg injury and is buried. On the twelfth day, the Others take nine more, including Emma and her brother Zack; Zack is shown holding a teddy bear in this episode, and this shows that he is the boy Mr. Eko and Jin saw when they hid from the Others in ...And Found (they observed that same teddy bear). Ana manages to kill another one, who is discovered to be carrying an antique United States Army knife and a list of the nine to be taken, along with their descriptions. While trying to sort out what happened, the notion of an infiltrator in their midst is discussed, as well as a proposal to leave the beach.

The survivors opt to head into the jungle. They make a camp near a source of fresh water and fruit trees. Ana digs a pit, which she turns into a cage. As soon as it is done, she knocks Nathan unconscious and throws him into the pit. She interrogates him, believing he is one of those who took the children, due to his unexplained absences and how nobody remembered seeing him on the plane. When asked where he came from, he replies Canada (the same country that Ethan Rom claimed to hail from). She begins starving him, demanding to know the location of the children, but Mr. Eko feeds him when she is not looking. Ana tells Goodwin she intends to start torturing Nathan the next day. That night, Goodwin frees Nathan, warning him of Ana's plan; when Nathan turns to leave, Goodwin breaks his neck, revealing to the viewers that he is the infiltrator.

The survivors move again and find a bunker marked by a DHARMA Initiative logo, with an arrow in the center. Inside a box they find a glass eye, a Bible and a radio. Goodwin and Ana go to higher ground to try to pick up a signal. While there, Ana reveals that she suspected that Goodwin is one of the Others, because on the first day, he ran out of the jungle with his clothes completely dry, ten minutes after the plane crashed into the water. Goodwin admits he killed Nathan, saying that he thought that if Ana tortured him and he didn't say anything, than Ana might view Nathan as innocent, and thus he'd no longer be a scapegoat. Goodwin comments that those taken were "good people", and that Nathan was not on the list because he was "not a good person", and states that the children are fine but doesn't elaborate on where they or any of the other captives are. The two fight; when they roll down a hill, Ana impales him on a sharpened stick (Goodwin's impaled body was seen by Jin and Eko two episodes earlier and when Jin asked if he was killed by the Others, Eko misunderstands him as asking if he was one of the Others).

Ana returns to the survivors and tells them, "We're safe here now". On the forty-first day, Bernard picks up Boone on the radio, and responds to Boone's "We're the survivors of the crash of Oceanic Flight 815" with "We're the survivors of flight 815." This shows the truth behind what Boone was hearing when he originally made the transmission in a previous episode from the first season. Before any further conversation can take place, Ana turns off the radio, dismissing the transmission as another trick by the Others. Bernard asks how they would know their flight number, but Ana points out that they would know since Goodwin knew, and tells them to accept that this is their new life now. She goes off by herself to cry, and Eko tells her everything will be all right. She tells him it took him forty days to speak; he tells her it took her forty days to cry.

Soon after, Cindy and Libby find Jin washed up on the shore. After pulling him from the water, they tie him up and blindfold him while they try to find out who he is. As Eko and Ana Lucia argue, Jin breaks free and runs to the beach.

The remainder of the episode is shown as a montage of the events already seen in the episodes "Orientation" through "Abandoned", including the tail-section survivors' acceptance of Jin, Sawyer and Michael, the trek to the midsection's camp, Sawyer falling ill, Cindy listening to the forest's whispers just before she is "taken", and the shooting of Shannon by Ana Lucia.

== Reception ==
The episode gained 21.87 million American viewers when it first aired.
