= The Brig (Lost) =

- Lost episode
- Sawyer strangles Anthony Cooper after he rips up Sawyer's letter written to him for causing his parents' deaths.
- Episode no.: Season 3 Episode 19
- Directed by: Eric Laneuville
- Written by: Damon Lindelof; Carlton Cuse
- Production code: 319
- Original air date: May 2, 2007
- Running time: 42 minutes

Guest appearances
- Nestor Carbonell as Richard Alpert; Mira Furlan as Danielle Rousseau; M. C. Gainey as Tom Friendly; Kevin Tighe as Anthony Cooper; Marsha Thomason as Naomi Dorrit; Kimberley Joseph as Cindy Chandler

Episode chronology
← Previous "D.O.C."	Next → "The Man Behind the Curtain"
- Lost season 3

"The Brig" is the 19th episode of the 3rd season of Lost, and the 68th episode overall. It aired on May 2, 2007. The episode was written by Damon Lindelof and Carlton Cuse and directed by Eric Laneuville. The character of John Locke (Terry O'Quinn) is featured in the episode's flashbacks, focusing on his time with The Others.

== Plot ==
=== Flashbacks ===
Flashbacks show the past eight days from Locke's perspective. Locke asks Ben and Tom why his father, Anthony Cooper (Kevin Tighe), is on the island and, when he ungags him, Cooper viciously bites him. As the Others leave, Locke follows. A few days later, Locke and the rest of the Others set up camp in a clearing in the middle of the jungle. As Locke helps Cindy Chandler (Kimberley Joseph) put up her tent, she tells him that the Others are excited that he's here with them. Ben summons Locke that night and tells him that he must kill Cooper in order to become one of them.

The Others have gathered to watch, but Locke is unable to kill Cooper, despite his father's contemptuous taunting of him. The next morning, while Locke is on a hillside overlooking the camp, Richard Alpert (Nestor Carbonell) joins him, telling him that Ben knew Locke wasn't going to kill his own father, and wanted to embarrass him. Richard tells Locke that if he won't kill Cooper, then someone else should, and hands him a file on Sawyer. The next day, Locke wakes to find that the Others have packed up and are ready to move on. Ben tells him they will leave a trail for him, that he must stay behind with Cooper and "clean up his mess", and that if he doesn't bring his father's body with him, then not to bother following.

=== In the Jungle/In the Black Rock ===
Kate Austen (Evangeline Lilly) wakes up during the night next to James "Sawyer" Ford (Josh Holloway), she explains she can only sleep in her own tent. She kisses him goodnight and leaves. Sawyer slips a handgun into his waistband and steps outside to urinate. He briefly converses with Hugo "Hurley" Reyes (Jorge Garcia) and Jin-Soo Kwon (Daniel Dae Kim), who are standing outside a tent. Inside the jungle, Sawyer is confronted by Locke, who has been gone for a week. Locke tells him that he has infiltrated the Others' camp and has taken their leader, Ben Linus (Michael Emerson), hostage, and needs Sawyer to kill him. Sawyer questions why Locke would come to him, and Locke explains that, thanks to the files the Others have on all of the Flight 815 survivors, he knows that Sawyer killed a man (Jeff Perry) in Sydney (this scene was shown in an episode from season one). Locke turns and leaves, and Sawyer reluctantly follows, barefooted.

As Locke and Sawyer trek through the jungle, Locke proceeds to reel off certain points of Sawyer's life, provoking Sawyer to attack him and threaten him with a knife. Locke admits that he cannot bring himself to kill Ben, whereas Sawyer reveals that he killed the wrong person by mistake and he didn't mean to kill the man he killed. Locke leads Sawyer to the Black Rock, the derelict slave ship seen in a previous episode, taking him inside to the brig where a man sits chained, gagged and hooded. Locke locks Sawyer in the brig with the prisoner, ignoring Sawyer's enraged pleas to unlock the door. Danielle Rousseau (Mira Furlan) enters the Black Rock and is surprised to see Locke. She explains she is looking for dynamite. Locke does not give an explanation for his presence or for Sawyer's banging on the door, but he does point her to the dynamite; she takes a crate and leaves. In the brig, Sawyer threatens to shoot Locke through the door if he won't open it, but Locke tells him that if his gun had bullets he would have threatened him with it, and not a knife, in the jungle.

An angered Sawyer removes the prisoner's hood and is startled to see it is not Ben, but in fact Cooper. Both are equally confused, but Cooper explains that he was involved in a car collision and the last thing he remembers is being lifted into the ambulance as the paramedics placed an I.V. needle in him. In accordance with what island newcomer Naomi claims, Cooper comments that Oceanic Flight 815 crashed in the middle of the ocean killing all those onboard, meaning that Locke is supposed to be dead; Cooper has surmised that he is in Hell, given that he is now seeing his supposedly dead son. Cooper explains to Sawyer that he is Locke's father, and that he conned Locke out of a kidney and pushed him out an eighth story window because he was a "nuisance". Suspicious, Sawyer asks the prisoner for his name. Cooper tells him a con man has many names, and begins to list his, including Tom Sawyer.

Upon questioning by Sawyer, Cooper reveals that he has been to Jasper, Alabama (apparently Sawyer's home town). Sawyer realizes Cooper is the "Sawyer" that he has been seeking all his life; Cooper is the man who conned Sawyer's mother out of her life savings, which caused Sawyer's father to kill Sawyer's mother before committing suicide. Sawyer orders Cooper to read the letter he wrote as a young boy; after reading the beginning, Cooper admits he took Sawyer's mother's money out of her own request, and tries to convince Sawyer that it is completely Sawyer's dad's fault for what he did to Sawyer's mother and himself. Enraged, Sawyer demands Cooper finish reading, but he tears the letter to pieces. Sawyer then chokes Cooper to death with his chains. Locke frees Sawyer, who vomits outside. Locke tells him that Juliet is a spy for the Others who know Sun is pregnant, and are planning to raid the camp in three days; Locke gives him her tape recorder as proof to present to the other survivors. He tells Sawyer he is not returning with him, because he is on his own journey now. Sawyer asks Locke if his father threw him out of a window and if John was a cripple. John answers "Not any more".

As the episode ends, Locke throws over his shoulder a sack with his father inside and heads into the jungle.

=== On the Beach ===
Charlie Pace (Dominic Monaghan) encounters Jack Shephard (Matthew Fox) when he goes into the kitchen tent to collect food for Naomi Dorrit (Marsha Thomason), whose presence in the camp remains unknown to all except Charlie, Hurley, Jin and Desmond Hume (Henry Ian Cusick). Charlie explains that the camping trip with Desmond, Jin and Hurley was "male bonding". Jack tells Charlie that if they plan another one to count him in. Back in the tent, Jin gives Naomi the food while Desmond questions whether Jack's loyalties lie with the survivors or with the Others, namely Juliet Burke (Elizabeth Mitchell). Because Naomi still needs medical attention, the four men decide to let Sayid Jarrah (Naveen Andrews) in on their secret.

On the beach, Sayid tells Charlie he admires his decision not to tell Jack about Naomi. Sayid questions Naomi. She explains that Penelope Widmore (Sonya Walger) hired her to search for Desmond, though she has not met her. She also repeats that the wreckage of Flight 815 was found off the shore of Bali, four miles underwater, and ROVs revealed that all passengers on board were dead. While searching for Desmond, she received coordinates which took her to the middle of the ocean. However, on her return to the search vessel, the island mysteriously appeared out of cloud cover, and her helicopter lost power as she managed to bail out. Sayid doubts her story and asks for the whereabouts of her helicopter. Naomi, apparently offended, gives Sayid her satellite phone and quips that she will not rescue him.

Back on the beach, Sayid and Hurley try to fix Naomi's radio. Sayid says the technology is more advanced than any he has ever seen. He manages to fix it but the signal is blocked. The noise of the static attracts a curious Kate. At first, Sayid is reluctant, but seeing no other choice, he tells Kate about Naomi, and asks her not to tell Jack. Kate, however, goes straight to Jack who is sitting with Juliet on the beach. She asks to speak privately to him but he says that whatever she has to say can be said in front of Juliet. Kate tells them about Naomi and that he wasn't told because no one on the beach trusts him anymore. Jack and Juliet then debate whether or not to tell Kate something. Juliet wants to, but Jack replies, "Not yet".

== Reception ==
12.33 million American viewers watched this episode.

== Awards ==
Kevin Tighe submitted this episode for consideration in the category of "Outstanding Guest Actor in a Drama Series" on his behalf for the 2007 Emmy Awards.
