= ...And Found =

- Lost episode
- Episode no.: Season 2 Episode 5
- Directed by: Stephen Williams
- Written by: Carlton Cuse; Damon Lindelof
- Production code: 205
- Original air date: October 19, 2005
- Running time: 42 minutes

Guest appearances
- Sam Anderson as Bernard Nadler; Tony Lee as Jae Lee; June Kyoko Lu as Mrs. Paik; Kimberley Joseph as Cindy Chandler; Rain Chung as Mr. Kim; Kim Kim as Mrs. Shin; Robert Dahey as Poor man; Josiah D. Lee as Tai Soo; Tomiko Okhee Lee as Mrs. Lee

Episode chronology
← Previous "Everybody Hates Hugo"	Next → "Abandoned"
- Lost season 2

"...And Found" is the fifth episode of the second season of Lost, and the 30th episode overall. The episode was directed by Stephen Williams, and written by Carlton Cuse and Damon Lindelof. It first aired on October 19, 2005, on ABC.

Sun-Hwa Kwon (Yunjin Kim) searches for her missing wedding ring; meanwhile, Michael Dawson (Harold Perrineau) conducts a solitary search for his kidnapped son. The characters of Sun and Jin-Soo Kwon (Daniel Dae Kim) are featured in the episode's flashbacks.

== Plot ==
=== Flashbacks ===
Sun is in South Korea, set up on a date by a matchmaker, and finds her prospective suitor, Jae Lee, to be wealthy, educated, and charming. Meanwhile, Jin is preparing for an important job interview at a hotel. His roommate, using what appears to be the I Ching, tells him that Jin will find love soon, adding cryptically that its color will be orange. Jin's interviewer, Mr. Kim, berates Jin as a bumpkin villager who stinks of fish, but then hires him as a doorman anyway, with a stern warning that Jin is not to open the door to anyone like himself. Sun and Jae continue to hit it off, and the pair schedule a meeting at the hotel where Jin is working and which Jae's family owns. Sun heads for the entrance of the hotel, but Jin fails to see her because he is bowing as he opens the door for her. Inside, Jae suddenly reveals that he plans to marry a woman he met in America, and has been seeing Sun only to placate his parents. Although she is obviously disappointed, Sun wishes him well and leaves. A poorly dressed father with a young boy approaches the hotel, and asks Jin for permission to enter, as the boy urgently has to go to the bathroom. Jin reluctantly lets the pair inside, but Mr. Kim observes this, and gives him a stern dressing-down, again insulting his background. Jin quits on the spot. Later, wandering along a bridge, Jin passes a woman in an orange dress. Looking back wistfully, he shakes his head in amusement, and turns around. He collides directly with Sun, thus meeting his future wife for the first time.

=== On the island ===
==== On the beach ====
At the beach, Sun has discovered that she has lost her wedding ring. Jack Shephard (Matthew Fox) offers to help Sun look for the ring, which Sun declines. Later, when Sun is angrily tearing apart her garden, John Locke (Terry O'Quinn) arrives. Sun states that she does not remember ever seeing him angry. Locke laughs and replies that he used to be angry often. Sun asks him why he no longer becomes angry, and he replies that he is not lost any more. Sun asks him how he found himself. Locke answers, "The same way anything lost gets found: I stopped looking."

When Kate Austen (Evangeline Lilly) tries to console her, Sun reveals that the message bottle had been recovered, and tells her that she has buried it. Upon digging up the bottle, Kate becomes upset and frantically attempts to read all of the messages. Sun stops her and says that the messages are private. Kate tells Sun that she never said goodbye to James "Sawyer" Ford (Josh Holloway). Kate then glances at the sand and tells Sun to look down – Sun finds her wedding ring lying in the sand.

==== On the other side of the island ====
Jin, Michael, Sawyer and the survivors of the tail section, Ana Lucia Cortez (Michelle Rodriguez), Mr. Eko (Adewale Akinnuoye-Agbaje), Libby Smith (Cynthia Watros), Bernard Nadler (Sam Anderson) and Cindy Chandler (Kimberley Joseph) decide to trek back to the safer side of the island. Michael, however, abruptly leaves to look for Walt (Malcolm David Kelley). Jin and Eko set off after Michael while the remaining survivors head for the other side of the island.

As they track Michael, Jin encounters a charging wild boar, and rolls down an escarpment. When he lands, he sees the body of another survivor (Brett Cullen), with a weapon still protruding from his chest. Eko informs Jin the man's name was "Goodwin." Jin then says "Others?" and Eko nods.

Eko picks up fresh tracks and tells Jin that it must be Michael. Moments later, Eko senses someone coming. As he and Jin hide, they see a procession of people go by in silence. The Others are seen only from the thighs down, all barefoot, all muddy, and the last is carrying a brown teddy bear on a cord. Later, the two find Michael. Eko successfully convinces him to go back, saying that the Others will not be found unless they want to be.

== Reception ==
The episode gained 21.38 million American viewers.
