= Collision (Lost) =

- Lost episode
- Episode no.: Season 2 Episode 8
- Directed by: Stephen Williams
- Written by: Javier Grillo-Marxuach; Leonard Dick
- Production code: 208
- Original air date: November 23, 2005
- Running time: 42 minutes

Guest appearances
- L. Scott Caldwell as Rose Nadler; Sam Anderson as Bernard Nadler; Rachel Ticotin as Teresa Cortez; Michael Cudlitz as "Big Mike" Walton; Maggie Grace as Shannon Rutherford; Rick Overton as Matthew Reed; Jeanna Garcia as Shawna; Mark Gilbert as Detective Raggs; Aaron Gold as Jason McCormack; Matt Moore as Travis; Rand Wilson as Assistant D.A.

Episode chronology
← Previous "The Other 48 Days"	Next → "What Kate Did"
- Lost season 2

"Collision" is the 33rd episode of Lost and the eighth episode of the second season. The episode was directed by Stephen Williams, and written by Javier Grillo-Marxuach and Leonard Dick. It first aired on November 23, 2005, on ABC. The character of Ana Lucia Cortez is featured in the episode's flashbacks.

== Plot ==
=== Flashbacks ===
Ana Lucia is a police officer in the Los Angeles Police Department, who was shot by a burglary suspect. After recovering, she has trouble dealing with the stress of the job. When she learns that the suspect who shot her, Jason McCormick, has been caught and has confessed, and all she needs to do is identify him, she takes a look, but says, "It's not him," and he is released. She then follows him herself, and confronts him in an empty parking lot. When she calls his name, he asks, "I know you?" at which point she states, "I was pregnant," shoots him three times in the chest and then proceeds to shoot him three times again in the head.

=== On the Island ===
Realizing that Ana Lucia has shot Shannon, Sayid pulls his gun on her, but Eko knocks him down and struggles with him. During the fight, Ana Lucia knocks Sayid unconscious, and then forces Libby to tie him up with vines from Sawyer's stretcher. Eko then carries Sawyer to find medical attention from the main group of survivors.

When the other tail-section survivors force Ana Lucia to tell them her plan to resolve the situation, she tells them that Michael must go back to the camp and return with ammunition, a pack, clothing, and food for Ana Lucia, who plans to survive on the island on her own. Michael leaves for the midsection survivor camp.

Back at the hatch, after Jack brings down Sawyer's temperature using the hatch's shower, he tries to get Sawyer to swallow medication. When he can't do it, Kate offers to help. She embraces Sawyer and whispers on his ear slowly telling him he has to swallow the medicine to get better. Sawyer then swallows the pill.

When Jack and Locke learn about what happened to Shannon and Sayid, they angrily demand that Eko guide them to the location, but Eko refuses, saying that, "Ana Lucia made a mistake," and Jack recognizes her name as someone he had been conversing with before boarding Oceanic Flight 815. Michael returns and informs Jack about Ana Lucia's demands and Mr. Eko agrees to take Jack, only, back to Ana Lucia, as long as he agrees not to take any guns.

After the other tail-section survivors, Libby and Bernard, leave Ana Lucia and follow Jin back to camp, Ana Lucia interrogates Sayid, asking him apparently odd questions such as whether or not he has any children. He asks her if she is going to kill him. Clearly experiencing mental anguish, he says perhaps she should kill him. Ana in response, relates her story, saying that when she was shot, all she heard was a pop and that by the time she hit the ground she thought she was dead. She tells him that she feels dead. When Sayid asks her what happened to the man who shot her, she says that nothing happened to him, and that he was never found. She then frees Sayid with Eko's machete, drops her weapon, and dares Sayid to take his revenge. But Sayid refuses, saying, "What good would it be to kill you, if we're both already dead?" and walks over to Shannon's body.

Eventually, the rest of the tail-section survivors and Jin make it back to the camp, where Bernard and Rose as well as Jin and Sun are finally reunited. The episode ends with Sayid carrying Shannon's body back to camp, and Ana Lucia and Jack, the two leaders of the survivor camps, facing each other for the first time after the crash.

== Development ==
Maggie Grace (Shannon) is no longer credited with the starring cast and is now credited as a "special guest star" when she appears.

== Reception ==
19.29 million American viewers watched the episode live.
