= Abandoned (Lost) =

- Lost episode
- Episode no.: Season 2 Episode 6
- Directed by: Adam Davidson
- Written by: Elizabeth Sarnoff
- Production code: 206
- Original air date: November 9, 2005
- Running time: 42 minutes

Guest appearances
- L. Scott Caldwell as Rose Nadler; Sam Anderson as Bernard Nadler; Lindsay Frost as Sabrina Carlyle; Francois Guetary as Philippe; Ian Somerhalder as Boone Carlyle; Kimberley Joseph as Cindy Chandler; Ashleigh Ann Wood as Nora; Michael Cowell as Doctor; David Ely as Intern; Maree Miller as Sophie

Episode chronology
← Previous "...And Found"	Next → "The Other 48 Days"
- Lost season 2

"Abandoned" is the 31st episode of the television series Lost, and is the sixth episode of the second season. The episode was directed by Adam Davidson and written by Elizabeth Sarnoff. It first aired on November 9, 2005, on ABC. The character of Shannon Rutherford (Maggie Grace) is featured in the episode's flashbacks.

== Plot ==
=== Flashbacks ===
Shannon is teaching ballet. She receives a call that her father has been in an accident and goes to the hospital, where she finds that he has died in a car crash. Shannon's father is the "Adam Rutherford" struck by the SUV driven by Jack's future wife, Sarah, in "Man of Science, Man of Faith". Also there, rushing to perform surgery on Sarah, Jack is seen, but he does not speak or play an important role in the episode. At the funeral, her stepbrother Boone Carlyle (Ian Somerhalder) arrives to console her. Later, when Shannon wins a dance internship in New York City, she finds she cannot go because her stepmother, Sabrina (Lindsay Frost), will not allow her to use any of her father's money. She pleads with her stepmother, who rebuffs her, suggesting her dream of becoming a dancer is just a passing whim, and that Shannon needs to make her own way. Boone attempts to help, but is unsuccessful in convincing his mother. When Shannon asks if she can stay in New York with him, he tells her that he is leaving the city to take a job working for his mother. He offers her money, but she angrily rejects it, telling him that if he doesn't believe she can make it on her own, she doesn't want his help.

=== On the Island ===
On the far side of the Island, Eko (Adewale Akinnuoye-Agbaje), Jin Kwon (Daniel Dae Kim) and Michael Dawson (Harold Perrineau) reunite with Ana Lucia Cortez (Michelle Rodriguez), James "Sawyer" Ford (Josh Holloway), Bernard Nadler (Sam Anderson), Libby Smith (Cynthia Watros) and Cindy Chandler (Kimberley Joseph). The eight leave for the camp made by the survivors of the midsection of the plane. Along the way, Sawyer collapses from infection; when Michael goes to assist him, Sawyer tells him to leave him behind and that if their positions were reversed, he would leave Michael. The survivors make a stretcher and carry Sawyer, though their journey will be considerably slowed. After an arduous battle to carry him up a hill, they look around and notice that Cindy has vanished. Immediately after, the seven hear whispering coming from all around.

Sayid and Shannon make love. Shannon is then horrified when she sees Walt standing in the tent saturated from head to toe. Shannon tells Sayid and he doesn't believe her, saying that it was probably just a bad dream. Shannon is convinced it's her destiny to find Walt, as she thinks he is all alone. Shannon leads Vincent the dog to Michael and Walt Lloyd's (Malcolm David Kelley) tent and shows him some of Walt's clothes, then follows as the dog searches for his master. Vincent leads Shannon to Boone's makeshift grave, where she stops to reflect. Sayid Jarrah (Naveen Andrews) finds her and asks what she is doing. She tells him she's going to find Walt and gets up to continue following Vincent. Sayid comes along, protesting. Shannon yells at Sayid, telling him that he does not believe in her and is going to abandon her.

Sayid tells her that he loves her and will never leave her. The pair embrace, then suddenly hear whispering; they look up and see Walt, who gestures them to remain silent. Shannon dashes after Walt and Sayid follows her until he trips. A gunshot is heard and Shannon is seen staggering back towards Sayid, who catches her as she collapses, bleeding from the torso. The camera pans back to reveal Ana Lucia with a smoking gun, and the episode ends with a view of a devastated Sayid holding Shannon's body.

== Production ==
Malcolm David Kelley (Walt) is credited with the starring cast for this episode. This episode marks main character Shannon Rutherford's death. She was the first main character to die in this season and second main character overall. Despite this, Maggie Grace is still credited as a series regular in the next episode and a special guest star onwards.

== Reception ==
Approximately 20,010,000 viewers watched the episode when it first aired. Virginia Rohan of The Seattle Times thought the "death of troubled Shannon, just as she was becoming more likable and had found love with Sayid, was sadder than the first-season death of her stepbrother, Boone. Still, it would grieve me far more to lose Jack, Kate, Sawyer, Locke, Sun or Jin". Maureen Ryan of the Chicago Tribune felt fans echoed this view, describing their reaction as "muted", as they were more angry at Ana Lucia for shooting Shannon. IGN ranked Shannon's death as the show's fifth-best death.
