= The Glass Ballerina =

- Lost episode
- A shocked Jin inspects Jae Lee, the dead man that just fell on his car.
- Episode no.: Season 3 Episode 2
- Directed by: Paul Edwards
- Written by: Jeff Pinkner; Drew Goddard
- Production code: 303
- Original air date: October 11, 2006
- Running time: 43 minutes

Guest appearances
- M. C. Gainey as Tom; Tania Raymonde as Alex; Michael Bowen as Danny Pickett; Tony Lee as Jae Lee; Byron Chung as Woo-Jung Paik; Paula Malcomson as Colleen Pickett; Joah Buley as Luke; Sophie Kim as Young Sun Paik; Tomiko Okhee Lee as Mrs. Lee; Teddy Wells as Ivan

Episode chronology
← Previous "A Tale of Two Cities"	Next → "Further Instructions"
- Lost season 3

"The Glass Ballerina" is the second episode of the third season of the TV series Lost, and the 51st episode overall. The episode was written by Jeff Pinkner and Drew Goddard and directed by Paul Edwards, and premiered on October 11, 2006, on ABC. The characters of Sun and Jin are featured in the episode's flashbacks; on the Island, they and Sayid attempt to discover the whereabouts of Jack, Kate, and Sawyer.

The episode was watched by an estimated 16.890 million viewers in the United States. It received mixed reviews, as multiple reviewers believed it was inferior to the previous week's season premiere; one stated the storyline caused the series to "take a step back [because it] delivers nothing new or substantial".

== Plot summary ==
=== Flashbacks ===
A young Sun-Hwa Kwon (Sophie Kim) breaks a glass ballerina and blames it on the maid, despite her father, Mr. Paik (Byron Chung), warning her the maid would be fired.

Later, Sun as an adult (Yunjin Kim) is shown having an affair with Jae Lee (Tony Lee), who attempts to give her a pearl necklace. She refuses, afraid that her husband would see it. Then, to her shame, Mr. Paik barges in and finds them in bed together. Mr. Paik later summons Sun's husband, Jin (Daniel Dae Kim), saying that Jae has been stealing from him, and telling Jin to put an end to it (implying that he is to be killed). But when Jin ambushes and beats up Jae, he still cannot bring himself to commit murder, and instead orders Jae to leave the country. However, as Jin gets into his car, Jae's body suddenly lands on his windshield. Jae's corpse hand is clutching the pearl necklace, implying that he jumped from the window. At Jae's funeral, Sun runs into her father. She asks if he would ever tell Jin about the affair, but he says that it was not his place to tell Jin.

=== On the island ===
On the sailboat, Sun, Jin-Soo Kwon (Daniel Dae Kim), and Sayid Jarrah (Naveen Andrews) argue about what to do because Jack Shephard's (Matthew Fox) party has not shown up; Sun goes against her husband's wishes and agrees with Sayid to sail to a new location. They find the Others' dock and come ashore to build a signal fire to try and lure the Others into an ambush. Meanwhile among the Others, Ben Linus (Michael Emerson) orders Colleen (Paula Malcomson) to put together a team and capture Sayid's boat. Her team avoids Sayid and Jin, and instead sneaks aboard the boat, where they encounter Sun below deck. Sun accidentally shoots Colleen in the abdomen and narrowly manages to escape overboard.

Kate Austen (Evangeline Lilly) and James "Sawyer" Ford (Josh Holloway) are forced to work in a quarry, digging and carrying rocks. Alex (Tania Raymonde) secretly asks Kate about Karl (Blake Bashoff). Sawyer creates a distraction by kissing Kate passionately, and steals a rifle, but is forced to relinquish it when Juliet Burke (Elizabeth Mitchell) threatens to shoot Kate. Back in their cages, Sawyer tells Kate what he learned about the fighting abilities of the various Others. He says that Juliet would have shot her without a problem and criticizes the other Others. They start discussing plans to escape, not knowing Ben is monitoring their conversation via security cameras.

Ben then visits Jack, telling him his real name, and that he has lived on the island all his life. He offers that if Jack cooperates, he can be sent home. Jack believes the Others are also stranded just as he is, but Ben informs him of the exact time and date of his plane crash and that 69 days have since passed (making the date November 29, 2004) and insists that they are in contact with the outside world. He shows this by citing various current events, such as the re-election of George W. Bush to the American presidency, the sudden death of Christopher Reeve and that the Boston Red Sox have won the 2004 World Series. Once Ben tells him about the Red Sox, Jack starts laughing and says that proves he is lying. Ben then proves it by playing a recording of the final play in the game as Jack watches in shock.

== Production ==
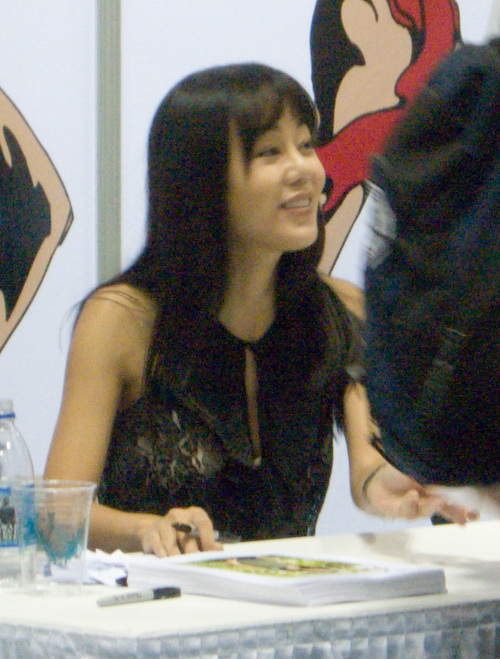
"The Glass Ballerina" featured flashbacks from Sun, played by Yunjin Kim (pictured).

Executive producer Jeff Pinkner and supervising producer Drew Goddard co-wrote "The Glass Ballerina", while cinematographer Paul Edwards served as the director. It featured recurring stars Byron Chung, Tony Lee, Michael Bowen, and Tomiko Okhee Lee, as well as the first of two appearances by guest actress Paula Malcomson. Though her character Colleen Pickett is shot in the episode, she does not die until the season's fourth episode, "Every Man for Himself".

Leading up to the premiere of the new season, showrunners Carlton Cuse and Damon Lindelof foreshadowed the episode's adultery storyline in an interview; Cuse mentioned, "How truthful has [Sun] been with Jin about her past?", to which Lindelof added, "And related to that, is the baby his?". Previously, a season two episode had seemed to confirm that Jin was infertile, leading to ramped up speculation online that Sun was pregnant by her lover Jae Lee. A later episode in the third season would resolve this storyline, showing that Jin was cured of his infertility and is the father of their baby. Sun's deception over the affair would later be resolved in the season four episode "Ji Yeon", when Juliet tells Jin about Sun and Jae Lee.

Actor Daniel Dae Kim enjoyed the fight scene between him and guest actor Tony Lee, commenting that "I really appreciate the fact that [Jin]'s just a down-and-dirty street fighter. I think his style of fighting fits his character". He continued "it was great to see a different layer to Sun's character. Because previously she had always been the good wife, and Jin was the bad husband". Actress Yunjin Kim added that "now we know that [Sun]'s not what she's been advertised to be for the last two seasons, but actually she has a lot of secrets."

== Reception ==
It was originally scheduled to air on October 18, 2006, but was swapped with the episode "Further Instructions" and broadcast one week earlier. When "The Glass Ballerina" first aired, it was the seventh most watched episode of the week in the United States, with 16.890 million viewers and a 6.9 rating in the key demographic of adults ages 18–49.

The problem with "The Glass Ballerina" is that the episode is ultimately boring. The narrative offers very little excitement or anything that will further advance the overall story. Just as things start to get interesting towards the end of the episode - it's over. Yes, it's sad that Jin and Sun have suffered through some painful relationship problems, but if it's not going to have a direct impact on events, there is no reason it should be in the episode. The biggest complaint that Lost garners from its audience is that the show utilizes plenty of filler and very little substance. An episode like this reinforces that argument.

— IGN reviewer Chris Carabott

Lost critic Andrew Dignan of Slant Magazine noted that like the season premiere, the episode "mostly serves to add uncomfortable wrinkles to one of the show's saints, going so far as to make the consistently sympathetic Sun quite unlikable." He added "While I... question the need for the flashbacks, I must confess to finding this particular episode more wonderfully twisted than usual." Jeff Jensen of Entertainment Weekly wrote "Last week's Jin/Sun episode was something of a disappointment, not because it was a bad episode of Lost, per se (I would give it a solid B), but because it wasn't as good as the exhilarating season premiere (which I would give an A+)."

IGN's Chris Carabott rated the episode 6.8/10, explaining that after the premiere's "exciting, new direction" of an episode, "The Glass Ballerina" helped Lost "take a step back [as it] delivers nothing new or substantial". He felt the flashbacks were repetitive and "a lot more like filler than the basis for compelling television", but praised the final scene between Jack and Ben as "the only compelling scene in the whole episode". On a list ranking all the Lost episodes, the Los Angeles Times ranked "The Glass Ballerina" 80 out of 110 episodes, explaining "A good flashback (to Sun and her pre-island lover) and a terrific last scene -- wherein Jack learns the Sox won the Series -- can't make up for a listless on-island plot." On a similar list, IGN rated the episode 106 out of 113 episodes, writing "it felt appropriate for Lost's third season to begin with an episode only featuring Jack, Sawyer and Kate, since their abduction by the Others was a big part of Season 2's conclusion. But having episode two of the season also focus so much on these three, with almost no plot momentum, was frustrating and rather uninteresting. Meanwhile, we do pick up with Sayid, Sun and Jin, but it's really only for yet another 'Sun and Jin have had a lot of big issues in their marriage' flashback – a topic we were well familiar with at this point."

Daniel Dae Kim and Yunjin Kim each submitted this episode for consideration on their own behalf for Outstanding Supporting Actor in a Drama Series and Outstanding Supporting Actress in a Drama Series respectively for the 59th Primetime Emmy Awards.
