= ? (Lost) =

- Lost episode
- Episode no.: Season 2 Episode 21
- Directed by: Deran Sarafian
- Written by: Damon Lindelof; Carlton Cuse
- Production code: 221
- Original air date: May 10, 2006
- Running time: 45 minutes

Guest appearances
- Nick Jameson as Richard Malkin; Adetokumboh M'Cormack as Yemi; Oliver Muirhead as Eko's monsignor; Melissa Bickerton as Joyce Malkin; Brooke Mikey Anderson as Charlotte Malkin; Peter Lavin as Caldwell; Felix Williamson as Dr. Ian McVay; François Chau as Dr. Mark Wickmund

Episode chronology
← Previous "Two for the Road"	Next → "Three Minutes"
- Lost season 2

"?", typically pronounced "Question Mark", is the 46th episode of Lost and the 21st episode of the second season. The episode was directed by Deran Sarafian, and written by Damon Lindelof and Carlton Cuse. It first aired on May 10, 2006, on ABC. The character of Mr. Eko is featured in the episode's flashbacks.

== Plot ==
=== Flashbacks ===
Eko is a priest in Australia. An associate gives him a counterfeit passport before he is sent to investigate a miracle of a drowned young girl named Charlotte, coming back to life on the autopsy table. At first, it appears that the miracle is genuine. Eko then consults the girl's father, Richard Malkin, the psychic that Claire visited in "Raised by Another". Malkin claims that the girl survived naturally (probably thanks to the mammalian diving reflex, which is more pronounced in young individuals), and that Charlotte and her mother are simply pretending that there was a miracle because they resent the fact that he is a fraudulent psychic. Eko reports that a miracle did not take place.

In the final flashback, Eko, about to board Flight 815, is confronted by Charlotte at the airport, who tells him that she saw Yemi while she was between the worlds and that his brother is proud of him. Angered, Eko starts to yell at Charlotte, who is interrupted by Libby, asking if everything was all right. Charlotte tells Eko that he'll see Yemi again.

=== On the Island ===
In a dream, Mr. Eko is chopping wood with his axe on the beach. He has visions of Ana Lucia and his brother, Yemi, saying that he must help John, who has "lost his way", by having John take him "to the question mark".

Michael (who had just freed Henry after shooting Ana-Lucia, Libby, and his own arm) stumbles out of the hatch, claiming that he has been shot in the arm by a person unknown to him (knowing they would think it was Henry). Sawyer, Kate, and Jack discover the shooting victims — Ana-Lucia is dead, and Libby is near death. When Michael realises that Libby is still alive, he is fearful that she will reveal the truth of what actually happened; Jack asks Sawyer for the heroin to 'make Libby comfortable'. He also asks Kate to go with Sawyer, giving him the choice of disclosing the location of the guns, or allowing Libby to die painfully. Sawyer resentfully agrees, and the guns turn out to be in a secret compartment inside his tent.

Eko offers to track down Henry Gale, with the assistance of Locke, but after they have left he reveals that his real goal is to force Locke to take him to the question mark, where they discover the burnt plane containing Yemi. They camp at the site, and Locke has a dream in which Yemi is on top of the nearby cliff. After he wakes up, Eko climbs the cliff and from the top looks down and is able to see a giant question mark etched in the grass adjacent to the plane. He climbs back down, and with Locke's help pushes aside the plane to find a hatch hidden underneath.

Inside the hatch, there are chairs, TV monitors, and pneumatic tubes. Locke places his map in one of the tubes and it is swept away. Locke also finds another computer terminal with a command prompt: ">: PRINT LOG? Y/N". Locke inputs Y, and a nearby dot-matrix printer begins to print out what appears to be an extensive list of timestamps. Eko also finds another Orientation movie of the Dharma Initiative from 1980, narrated by Dr. Marvin Candle, now going by the name of "Mark Wickmund", where it is revealed that the hatch they are in is "Station 5: The Pearl", and it was made to observe the other station(s) and record how the subjects react to things of great importance. Wickmund reveals that those in the other hatches are undergoing a psychological experiment and the pneumatic tubes are used to send information back to the DHARMA Initiative. Locke thinks that he has been played a fool, and does not believe the button to have any use. However, Mr. Eko believes that pushing the button is highly important, and he will continue to do so if Locke stops.

At the Swan, Hurley requests to speak to Libby, and he tearfully apologizes to her for forgetting the blankets. In her dying breath, she says, "Michael!", with a look of terror in her eyes. Jack, mistaking her horror as fear for Michael's safety, assures her that Michael is fine. Hurley starts to cry, as does Kate; Sawyer hugs Kate and she cries in his arms. Locke and Mr. Eko are seen making their way back to The Swan, as the timer starts to sound, the numbers needing to be entered into the computer; the episode ends with Michael in the armory, looking gravely toward the doorway, his plan unfolding.

== Production ==
This episode marks main character Libby's death, originally thought to be dead in the previous episode. She was the fourth main character to die in the series thus far (the others being Boone Carlyle (played by Ian Somerhalder), Shannon Rutherford (played by Maggie Grace) and Ana Lucia Cortez (played by Michelle Rodriguez)). Cynthia Watros remains credited as a series regular until the end of the season.

Darren Aronofsky was scheduled to direct the episode, but declined after his partner Rachel Weisz got pregnant, being replaced by Deran Sarafian. Writers Damon Lindelof and Carlton Cuse called the episode "a great opportunity for us to finally put Locke and Mr. Eko together, sort of a philosophical battle of faith and will that we've been hinting at all season long."

== Reception ==
16.35 million American viewers watched the episode live.
