= Libby (Lost) =

Fictional character of the TV series Lost

- Lost character
- Cynthia Watros as Libby in 2005.
- First appearance: "Adrift" (stand-in) "Everybody Hates Hugo" (portrayed by Watros)
- Last appearance: "The End"
- Created by: J. J. Abrams; Damon Lindelof
- Portrayed by: Cynthia Watros
- Centric episode(s): Individual: None; Shared: "The Other 48 Days" "Dave"

In-universe information
- Full name: Elizabeth
- Species: Human
- Gender: Female
- Occupation: Clinical psychologist
- Nationality: American
- Former residence: Newport Beach, California, United States

Libby is a fictional character on the ABC drama television series Lost, which chronicles the lives of over forty people after their plane crashes on a remote island somewhere in the South Pacific. She is played by American actress Cynthia Watros. The character is introduced as a member of the tail section survivors in the second season episode "Everybody Hates Hugo", together with Bernard, and she ends her role as a living character in the episode "?".

After one posthumous flashback appearance in the Season 2 finale “Live Together, Die Alone”, she makes three further non-standard appearances as an apparition and bardo-like entity. Her backstory remains unresolved. Watros was intended to appear in two further episodes in the fourth season designed to resolve her character's backstory (after cameoing as a ghost). Due to the 2007–08 Writers Guild Strike, those appearances were postponed to the sixth and final season, albeit in a different format.

Reception towards the character is generally positive, especially after her death. Her given name, Elizabeth, was revealed in the season 2 episode “Live Together, Die Alone”. A 2009 San Diego Comic-Con panel video listed her surname as "Smith", though this is never mentioned on-screen.

She is one of four main characters to never receive a flashback centric episode dedicated to the character (the others being Ilana Verdansky, Frank Lapidus, and Charlotte Lewis), though the character has a brief flashback at the end of the episode "Dave" shown from her point of view.

== Prior to the crash ==
Little is known about Libby's life prior to the island. She states in "The Other 48 Days" that she visited Vermont, where she broke her leg in a skiing accident, and she attended medical school for a year before dropping out to become a clinical psychologist.

As shown in "Live Together, Die Alone", she meets Desmond (played by Henry Ian Cusick) at a café before she arrives on the island. There, she tells him that she is from Newport Beach, California, and when she learns about his intention to join a sailing race, she decides to donate her sailboat Elizabeth, a gift given to her and named after her by her late husband David. She also stayed in the Santa Rosa Mental Institution, a place whose patients include Hurley (Jorge Garcia), as well as Emily Locke, John Locke's (Terry O'Quinn) mother. Prior to boarding the Oceanic flight, she intervenes during an argument between Mr. Eko (Adewale Akinnuoye-Agbaje) and Charlotte Malkin (Brooke Mikey Anderson) in "?".

== After the crash ==
Libby ends up in the tail-section with another twenty-one survivors. She immediately tries to help the injured, such as Donald (Glenn Lehmann), due to her background with medicine. Some, however, including Donald, die a few days later. The Others invade their camp and kidnap all the remaining survivors except her and six others: Ana Lucia (Michelle Rodriguez), Mr. Eko, Bernard (Sam Anderson), Cindy (Kimberley Joseph), Nathan (Josh Randall), and Goodwin (Brett Cullen). Paranoia soon afflicts Libby and the remaining tail-section survivors causing them to speculate Nathan is not part of the flight and is an Other, which leads to his death. Eventually, she and the remaining survivors make their way to The Arrow, where they find a radio allowing them to make a brief contact with Boone (Ian Somerhalder). Goodwin, the real Other, tries to steal this radio, but Ana Lucia stops and kills him in self defense. Her group stays in The Arrow until Jin (Daniel Dae Kim), Michael (Harold Perrineau), and Sawyer (Josh Holloway) arrive there in "Everybody Hates Hugo", when her group learns about other survivors.

Libby's group soon decides to leave and join the main group of survivors. Before their journey, however, Ana Lucia orders her and Michael to get some fruit ("...And Found"). Soon, Michael finds out, through her, where the Others are and decides to leave her in search for his son, Walt (Malcolm David Kelley). Mr. Eko and Jin find Michael, leading him back to Libby and the group and allowing them to start their journey. During their trek in "Abandoned", numerous tragedies occur, including the disappearance of Cindy and the death of Shannon (Maggie Grace). Once she joins the main camp, she and Hurley start to become romantically involved, especially when she tells him that she remembers when he stepped on her foot in the plane. Aside from Hurley, Libby also becomes friends with Claire (Emilie de Ravin), whom she helps in unlocking the memories of Claire's kidnapping in "Maternity Leave". She also tries to help out with Bernard's S.O.S. but loses interest. In "Dave", Libby helps Hurley solve his food addiction, but this fails when a food pallet coincidentally "falls from the sky" during a supply drop. Sensing something is wrong, she confronts him and eventually ends up on a cliff, where Hurley is about to jump. She tries to stop him, which leads to her professing her feelings for him.

As their relationship grows, Hurley decides to plan dates. In "Two for the Road", he secretly plans a picnic for her but eventually confesses when he is caught with food. Once they arrive at the beach, he tells her that he forgot drinks and blankets, so she tells him to get Rose (L. Scott Caldwell) and Bernard's bottle of wine while she gets the blankets. This turns out to be a fatal mistake for her, because she is accidentally shot by Michael while getting them. Hours later, Libby is found unconscious alongside a dead Ana Lucia and an injured Michael, while "Henry Gale" (Michael Emerson) is found to have fled. Jack (Matthew Fox) tries to save her but fails, so he decides to ease her pain with heroin. Once Jack has injected the drug, she stirs and says "Michael" but says nothing more. Jack assumes it is out of concern and tells her Michael is okay, but then she makes one last gasp and passes, dying with Hurley at her bedside. She is buried beside Ana Lucia, coincidentally during the reappearance of Desmond aboard the Elizabeth. Two weeks later, Hurley visits Libby's grave and expresses how much he misses her before leaving a flower.

Off the island, Libby's presence continues to haunt Michael after her death. In one scene in "Meet Kevin Johnson", she appears to Michael in the hospital as a nurse with blankets on her stomach, representing the position she was in when she was shot. This turns out to be a dream. She even follows him in the freighter Kahana, where she tries to trick Michael into not pushing a button, which he pushes anyway. In an extended version of the Oceanic Six press conference, they say Libby was one of the eight initial survivors, but died during the first week.

== Afterlife ==
Libby is in the mental institution in the alternate timeline. One day, she sees a Mr. Cluck's commercial with Hurley in it, and memories of her past life on the Island come flooding back to her. Later, at a Mexican restaurant, Libby sees Hurley and tells him she thinks they may be connected and be soul mates. Hurley later tracks her down, and she tells him of her visions and the fact in those visions Hurley was also in the mental institution. Hurley then invites her on a date. On the date they kiss and Hurley's memories of the Island come flooding back to him, and he assures Libby she is not crazy. When the alternate time line is revealed to be a meeting place before the afterlife Libby reunites with many of the other characters in a church. She sits beside Hurley as they move on together into the afterlife.

== Personality ==
Libby is a mysterious character, seated at the tail-section of the plane. Her character was written to be in her late forties to early fifties, easy on the eyes, amicably maladjusted, and a compulsive liar so good at what she does, most people will not know she is not what she seems. Damon Lindelof was quoted in Variety as saying the character "is going to bring a flavor to the show that doesn't exist right now. She's not as intense as some of the other characters. She's that person you want in the trenches with you who can take lemons and make lemonade."

Libby is seen by some as a beautiful blonde "Tailie" and Hurley's true love. She is often described as mysterious, especially since much of her backstory is yet to be revealed. IGN has described her as a "loose end" in the storyline due to the contradictions between what she tells other characters and the flashbacks viewers see about her, such as her profession as a clinical psychologist and her stay at a mental institution.

On the show, she is often seen as helpful to other people, such as Donald, Jin, Claire, Bernard, and Desmond. One example of her exhibiting this virtue is when she assists Hurley in resolving his mental problems. Characters described her as a "shrink" or as a "mega cute blonde chick" due to her profession and appearance. Sawyer, meanwhile, has used the nickname "Moonbeam" on her due to her upbeat hippie-like personality.

== Development ==
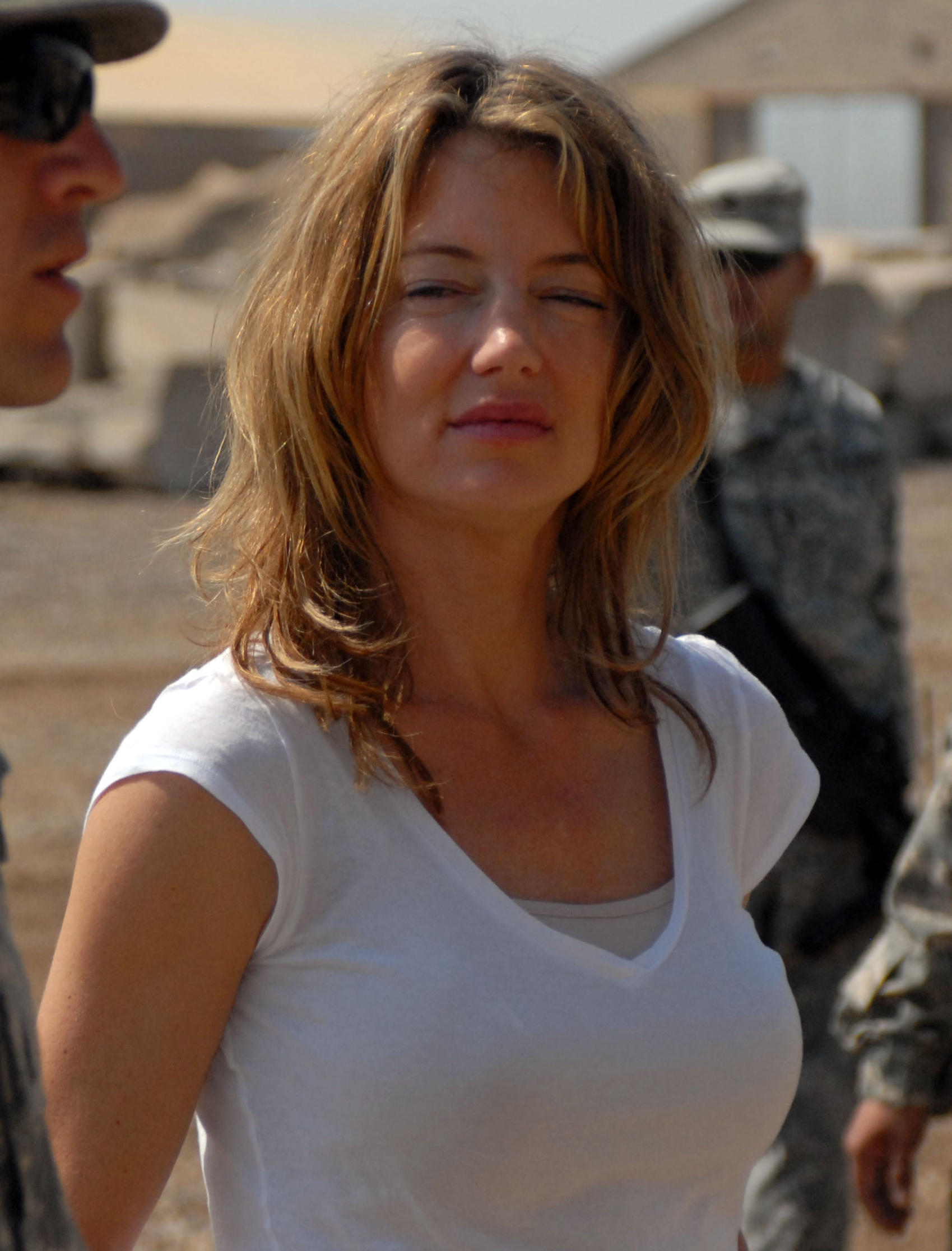
Cynthia Watros did not think she was going to be cast as Libby.

American actress Cynthia Watros portrays Libby in about twenty-one episodes of the series. Veteran actress Jennifer Jason Leigh was approached to play the character, but Watros ended up playing the role instead. During her audition, Watros did not think she would be cast. When she learned she had awarded the role, she was excited since she was a fan of the show and moved with her twin daughters from Los Angeles to Hawaii where Lost is filmed.

The producers claimed Libby was not going to be killed off, but since Ana Lucia Cortez was considered an unpopular character, the producers thought her death would not generate enough sympathy from fans. They decided Libby, who was well liked, should also be killed for emotional impact. Additionally, the producers and writers ran out of ideas for a compelling storyline for the character. According to Carlton Cuse and Damon Lindelof, the writers did try to develop her story through her romance with Hurley but they ran out of possible avenues. The writers also thought her story was not as dramatic when juxtaposed with the other characters.

Midway through the second season, Watros and Michelle Rodriguez were arrested for driving under the influence in Kailua, Hawaii, in two separate incidents on the same night. This led fans to speculate this was the cause of the two characters' deaths in the episode "Two for the Road". The producers denied this claim, and Rodriguez confirmed the producers' comments and denied the relation between their arrests and their characters' deaths. Watros took the news of the death of her character badly and was sad about the decision. The producers felt sorry for her and tried to help her get a new job. She was cast in a pilot for a show on CBS called My Ex-Life, although it was not picked up by the network.

Libby is one of the few main characters not to have a centric episode detailing her life before the crash. The writers said a reason for killing the character was so they could explore her backstory in a mysterious and posthumous way. The producers intended to explore Libby's backstory through flashbacks in the show's third and fourth seasons, respectively. Her character did not appear in season 3 and her season 4 appearance did not provide insight into her past. In September 2008, the writers stated her backstory would probably be explored in the fifth season; however, Lindelof revealed in May 2009 that her story would not be explored any further, saying, "I have learned that if you kill someone off the show, they are less likely to cooperate with you". The producers said Watros was busy with other commitments, and they could not reveal Libby's story without her.

It is revealed in a deleted scene that Libby had been married three times prior to the plane crash and she specializes in marriage counseling. Theories about unknown aspects of her life exist, including assumptions she was once a DHARMA Initiative employee, an Other, a person planted by Desmond's flashback characters Mrs. Hawking and Brother Campbell. Her surname was not given during the show's run, but was later revealed as Smith during Comic-Con 2009 in an in memoriam clip show of Lost's major death scenes.

The producers brought the character back to the show in the second half of the final season. About the return of Libby, Cuse stated, "Finally, all of your questions [about Libby] will be answered", however, Lindelof jokingly responded, "No, they will not". Watros said about the reunion with Hurley and Libby in season six: "[It was] so sweet and honest. And I think, hopefully, when people see our scenes that they’ll get that feeling, too. [Libby and Hurley] are so incredibly real with each other. I was really grateful that I got to play those scenes and Libby got to sort of express herself in ways that she hasn't been able to."

== Reception ==
Libby is a well-liked character. After her death, her popularity increased due to the added mystery to her character. In a poll conducted by BuddyTV about five characters seldom seen on the show, she received the highest votes. Meanwhile, her romantic fling with Hurley was described by Entertainment Weekly as "well-played" and "charming". Cynthia Watros co-won the 2005 Screen Actors Guild Award for "Best Ensemble – Drama Series. When she returned to the show in 2008, Watros was praised by the producers who said she "is a smart and engaging actor".
