= Kimberley Joseph =

Canadian Australian actress

- Born: Kimberley Hawryluk; August 30, 1973 (age 53); Vancouver, British Columbia, Canada
- Occupations: Actress, photographer, former television presenter
- Years active: 1992–present

Kimberley Joseph (born August 30, 1973) is a Canadian Australian actress who is based in the United States. Joseph was born in Canada, brought up on the Gold Coast in Australia and educated in Switzerland. After returning to Australia, she began a degree at Bond University but dropped out at the age of 19 when she was cast in the soap opera Paradise Beach. She had no formal acting training but appeared in the soap for the 18 months it was produced. After Paradise Beach ended, she had casual work on Hey Hey It's Saturday before co-hosting the popular Seven Network series Gladiators.

After three series of Gladiators, Joseph was eager to return to acting, so took the role of villain Joanne Brennan in Home and Away from 1995 to 1996. In 1999, she moved to the United States to study acting at the Atlantic Theater Company in New York City, then spent 18 months unsuccessfully auditioning for roles in Los Angeles. In 2001, she was cast as Jo Ellison in the British television series Cold Feet. She appeared in the fourth and fifth series and returned to Australia two days after filming the final episode in 2002. In 2004, she appeared in a major recurring role as Dr. Grace Connelly in six episodes of the Australian soap opera All Saints. She returned to America after filming All Saints, where she got a small role as flight attendant Cindy Chandler in the pilot episode of Lost. The role was supposed to be a one-off in the pilot but a producer liked Joseph and the character, so brought her back for a recurring role in the second, third and sixth seasons. Away from acting, Joseph has been involved in efforts to highlight the effects of Soviet nuclear testing in Kazakhstan, including directing a short film.

== Early life ==
Kimberley Joseph was born on August 30, 1973, in Vancouver, British Columbia, Canada, to Joe and Wendy. Joe, a Canadian businessman, met Wendy, an Australian flight attendant, while she was in Canada. When Kimberley was three years old, the family moved to Australia's Gold Coast, where she attended St Hilda's School for the next nine years. The family travelled extensively in Europe, and Kimberley attended a private school in Montreux, Switzerland, for four years. While there, she learned to speak French and Spanish. When she returned to Australia, she started a degree in arts and commerce at Bond University, though did not complete it.

== Career ==
At the age of 19, Joseph dropped out of University after getting the part of Cassie Barsby in the soap opera Paradise Beach. Like many of the cast, she had no formal acting training, though she turned this to her advantage with "exuberance and energy". Joseph gained acting experience and friendships with Raelee Hill, Megan Connolly, and Isla Fisher, though the series was cancelled after only 18 months. After Paradise Beach ended, she began appearing in the Nine Network variety show Hey Hey It's Saturday. Joseph had no contract with Nine, and was making the appearances as a favour to her friend, host Daryl Somers. Nine Network executives wanted to make her a regular on the show and began using her in publicity material. However, rival network Seven offered her a contract to co-host Gladiators before Nine could make her Hey Hey contract permanent. Her defection to Seven in 1995 caused a small scandal. She described hosting Gladiators as "tough and scary" on account of the live audience. She appeared for three seasons and some international specials before taking the role of Joanne Brennan in Home and Away in an effort to get away from presenting. The character, a secretary who dealt drugs to school children, appeared from 1995 to 1996. She left the soap with the possibility of returning to the character later. Alongside her role in Home and Away, she appeared in a play with Geoffrey Hughes.

Until 1999, she continued working as a "jobbing actress", making appearances in Hercules: The Legendary Journeys and Sale of the Century, and Tales of the South Seas. Eager to move away from soap opera acting, Joseph moved to the United States to study acting with the Atlantic Theater Company in New York City. She then moved to Los Angeles, where she spent 18 months living off her savings trying to get auditions. In those 18 months, her only jobs were a single commercial and a job interviewing LA-based film actors for Australian television. In 2001, her lawyer informed her that she would have to travel to Sydney to be interviewed for her green card. On the day she was due to fly back to Australia, her agent informed her of an audition for the British television series Cold Feet, whose producer was looking for an Australian actress to become a new main cast member. Two weeks later she had moved to Manchester, England and was doing script read-throughs with the rest of the cast. Her character, Jo Ellison, appeared in all episodes of the fourth and fifth series. Two days after filming the final episode in 2002, Joseph left Britain and returned to Australia.

In 2004, she appeared on Australian television for the first time since 1999, playing Dr. Grace Connelly in six episodes of All Saints. The day after she completed filming of her scenes, she returned to Los Angeles for the pilot season. She got a small part as a flight attendant in the pilot episode of Lost. Joseph's scenes, on an airplane set, were filmed over two and a half days in Los Angeles. An early script draft of the pilot called for her character to be seen dead on a beach, though subsequent rewrites removed the scene. A producer liked Joseph and her character, and planned to bring both back to the series at a later date. She returned at the beginning of the second season, when it was revealed that her character, given the name Cindy Chandler, had survived the plane crash in the pilot episode along with other passengers from the tail section of the plane. Despite being asked not to change her appearance too much after the pilot, Joseph had her hair cut, so in her first few episodes of the second season she had to "go through the whole debacle of putting a Rambo scarf around [her] head, which just looked ridiculous." Her episodes for season two were filmed over five weeks and were broadcast in 2005. Her character was abducted in the middle of an episode and was not seen again until in the third season, when Joseph reprised the role for two episodes and the whereabouts of her character are revealed. Joseph resumed the role for the sixth and final season in 2010.

Joseph also filmed minor roles in two Ron Howard films; in Frost/Nixon (2008), she portrayed tennis champion Evonne Goolagong, and she had a minor role in Angels & Demons (2009). Although of a different ethnicity to Goolagong, she was cast in Frost/Nixon because she had the "right look". Both of her scenes were cut from the films before release.

In 2011, Joseph appeared in television commercials for HughesNet, the satellite-based Internet Service Provider.

In 2013, Joseph appeared in Linkin Park's music video for their single Castle of Glass. Joseph played the bereaved wife of a deceased Navy SEAL.

In 2016, Kimberley ‘Hawryluk’ appears on Series 1 Episode 4 of “Restored” as Decorator to Restoration Expert Brett Waterman, who restores an 1895 Victorian farmhouse in Redlands, CA, USA.

== Personal life ==
Joseph lives in Los Angeles, where she is based for acting. She has been involved in Aid International projects highlighting the effects of Soviet nuclear testing in Semey, Kazakhstan. In 2003 she visited the area with Scottish MEP Struan Stevenson, where she photographed victims of radiation poisoning. The photographs were displayed in the Scottish Parliament building in 2004 and published in Stevenson's book Crying Forever in 2006. She returned to the area with Stevenson in July 2008 and has developing a documentary film to attract international attention to the area. The 13-minute film, entitled When the Dust Settles, premiered on 12 November 2009 at the Birch Carroll & Coyle cinema in Southport, Queensland.

Joseph and partner Scott Chrisman have a son, born in 2013.

== Filmography ==
Year	Title	Role	Description
1992	Paradise Beach	Cassie Barsby	Television series
1995–1996	Home and Away	Joanne Brennan	Television series
1997–1999	Hercules: The Legendary Journeys	Nemesis	2 episodes of television series: "Two Men and a Baby" (1997); "Full Circle" (1999)
1998–1999	Tales of the South Seas	Clare Devon	1 season of television series
1999	Water Rats	Mary Worth	1 episode of television series: "Dangerous Encounters"
2000	Murder Call	Andrea Thatcher	1 episode of television series: "Scent of Evil"
2001–2003	Cold Feet	Jo Ellison	2 seasons of television series
2004	Go Big	Sophie Duvet	Feature film
2004	All Saints	Dr. Grace Connelly	7 episodes of television series: "Feet of Clay"; "Pecking Order"; "Luck of the Draw"; "Consequences"; "When Worlds Collide"; "Mind Over Matter"; "Falling from Grace"
2004–2010	Lost	Cindy Chandler	13 episodes of television series: "Pilot, Part 1" (2004); "Pilot, Part 2" (2004); "Everybody Hates Hugo" (2005); "...And Found" (2005); "Abandoned" (2005); "The Other 48 Days" (2005); "Stranger in a Strange Land" (2007); "The Brig" (2007); "LA X, Part 1" (2010); "LA X, Part 2" (2010); "Sundown" (2010); "Recon" (2010); "The Last Recruit" (2010)
2005	Fight Night	Tracey	Feature film
2022–present	Rock Island Mysteries	Emily Young	Television series Recurring role

As host

- Gladiators (1995–1996)
- Gladiators: The Ashes 1 (1995–1996)
- International Gladiators 2 (1996)

As director

- When the Dust Settles (2009; documentary short)

Preceded by N/A	Co-host of Gladiators (with Aaron Pedersen and Mike Hammond); 1995-1997	Succeeded by Zoe Naylor (2008 revival)
