= Tom Friendly =

Character from the American TV show Lost

- Lost character
- First appearance: "Exodus: Part 2"
- Last appearance: "Meet Kevin Johnson"
- Portrayed by: M. C. Gainey

In-universe information
- Gender: Male

Tom Friendly, often referred to as Tom, Mr. Friendly, or Zeke by Sawyer is a fictional character portrayed by M. C. Gainey on the American Broadcasting Company (ABC) television series Lost. The series follows the lives of around forty survivors from the crash of Oceanic Flight 815. The survivors find themselves on a mysterious tropical island, and interact with a group they dub the Others, who appear to have lived on the Island long before the crash. Tom is an influential member of the Others, introduced in the season one finale "Exodus: Part 2", where he kidnaps one of the survivors. The character makes another fifteen appearances before being killed in the season three finale "Through the Looking Glass". Tom appears twice in season four in the flashbacks of other characters. Gainey was initially credited as playing "bearded man" and then as "Mr. Friendly" throughout season two before the character was given a first name. In a montage of deceased characters shown at Comic-Con in 2009, the Lost producers present the character's full name as "Tom Friendly".

Gainey accepted the role despite knowing nothing about it; his sole motivation was a chance to work again with Lost producer Carlton Cuse. Speculation over Tom's sexuality arose when he commented to Kate that she was "not [his] type". Gainey began playing the character as such, and in season four Tom is shown kissing another man on the cheek. Lost producer Damon Lindelof commented that this revelation was "not subtle, to say the least". Tom was received positively by critics, particularly in his first appearance.

== Arc ==
In a flashback during "The Other Woman", set around three years before the crash of Oceanic Flight 815, Tom has a brief conversation with newly recruited Other Juliet Burke (Elizabeth Mitchell), where he mentions he is a patient of therapist Harper Stanhope (Andrea Roth). Shown in flashbacks during "Maternity Leave", when Claire Littleton (Emilie de Ravin) is kidnapped by the Others a few weeks after the plane crash, Tom oversees Ethan Rom's (William Mapother) progress at the Others' medical station. He criticizes Ethan for kidnapping Claire before making "the list". After forty-four days on the Island, the survivors finish building a raft, with Michael Dawson (Harold Perrineau), his ten-year-old son Walt Lloyd (Malcolm David Kelley), James "Sawyer" Ford (Josh Holloway) and Jin-Soo Kwon (Daniel Dae Kim) volunteering to sail it. Tom makes his first appearance in "Exodus: Part 2", where he arrives in a motorboat, wearing a fake beard and old clothes, with a crew of Others who kidnap Walt and destroy the raft. When Michael goes searching for the Others in the jungle, Tom captures him, and then confronts the other survivors who are looking for Michael. Tom warns them not to come any closer to the Others and then leaves with Michael in tow. A deal is made for Michael to bring Jack Shephard (Matthew Fox), Kate Austen (Evangeline Lilly), Sawyer and Hugo "Hurley" Reyes (Jorge Garcia) to the Others in exchange for Walt. In the second season finale "Live Together, Die Alone", Michael successfully leads Jack, Kate, Sawyer and Hurley to the ambush point; various Others including Tom sedate them and take them to a pier. There, Tom knocks Jack, Kate and Sawyer unconscious and transports them to a small island nearby.

In season three, Tom supervises an operation on Ben Linus (Michael Emerson), the leader of the Others, which Jack is performing, and is coerced into letting Kate and Sawyer escape. He loses trust in Juliet, believing her to be plotting against Ben, and expresses his views to the Others' sheriff, before returning to the Island. Shown in a flashback during season four, Tom leaves the Island and tracks down Michael in Manhattan, where Michael is trying to kill himself. He tells Michael that the Island will not let him die and gives him the address of his hotel penthouse. There, Tom convinces Michael to work for Ben, and instructs him to get a job as a janitor on board a freighter that is about to set sail from Fiji. When Michael arrives at the port Tom tells him to wait a day or two before activating an explosive device, to kill all the freighter crew, preventing them from reaching the Island. He returns to the barracks and is seen playing football with Jack. Shortly after this, he and the Others abandon the barracks, making camp in the jungle en route to the temple. Tom is shocked when Ben agrees to take one of the survivors, John Locke (Terry O'Quinn), to see Jacob, Ben's superior. His faith in Ben's leadership is shaken, and he ignores Ben's calls to intervene when Locke begins to beat another Other, Mikhail Bakunin (Andrew Divoff). When Ben returns from Jacob, he orders a raid on the survivors' beach camp that night; Tom is part of the party sent. In "Through the Looking Glass", the season three finale, Jin, Sayid Jarrah (Naveen Andrews) and Bernard Nadler (Sam Anderson) are captured by the party, and Ben radios Tom to shoot them. This prearranged code is the signal for Tom to shoot three bullets into the ground, only pretending to kill the hostages, to mislead the rest of the survivors, who have been met by Ben. Afterwards Tom expresses regret at not finishing the hostages, as they killed seven of the Others. The arrival of Hurley in a van, along with Sawyer and Juliet, sees the rest of the attack party killed. Tom admits defeat and surrenders, but Sawyer shoots him in his heart, claiming his life as payment for taking Walt off of the raft. Juliet later buries Tom near the jungle along with his team of deceased Others.

== Characteristics ==
Tom wearing his fake beard in "Three Minutes"

When Tom is introduced in the first season finale, he wears a fake beard and old clothes. He continues to appear under this guise throughout the second season, only revealing his beard to be fake in the finale. M. C. Gainey, the actor who portrays Tom, was only informed that his character's beard was fake near the end of season two. The producers describe Tom as "friendly", earning him the nickname "Mr. Friendly". One critic has described him as "sarcastic" and "bright". Tom's dislike of blood causes him to struggle while supervising Ben's operation, which Emerson believes makes him "cuddly". Gainey does not think he is very similar to Tom, commenting, "He seems to be very loyal and I'm a very loyal person so I have that in common, but other than that, I don't really know what he's about. He seems much more socially awkward than I am." After Tom was revealed to be gay during season four, M. C. Gainey stated that "anytime you've got a group of people, somebody's got to be marching to a different drummer - that would be Tom Friendly."

== Development ==
M. C. Gainey first met Lost producer Carlton Cuse while working on The Adventures of Brisco County, Jr. The opportunity to work with Cuse again was motivation enough to take the part of Tom, even without a script or description of the character. Gainey watches every episode of the series, but admits to not knowing what is happening much of the time. In his first appearance, in the season one finale "Exodus: Part 2", Gainey was credited as "bearded man", and was lovingly called "Gay Tom" in season 4. then in his season two appearances as "Mr. Friendly". In the Official Lost Podcast, Damon Lindelof confirmed Mr. Friendly is not his real name, but is how the producers refer to him internally, because "he's so friendly"; however, his surname was later suggested to actually be Friendly during Comic-Con 2009. He is nicknamed "Zeke" by Sawyer in "The Hunting Party", which led to some critics using this name for him. In the season two finale "Live Together, Die Alone", his name is revealed to be Tom. On his character's death, Gainey noted that "just because they kill you on this show, don't mean they don't need you anymore 'cause everybody's got a past."

In the third season premiere "A Tale of Two Cities", Tom tells Kate that she is not his type. This comment resulted in online discussion in regard to Tom's sexual orientation, and Lindelof and Cuse hinted that a Lost character would later be outed. Gainey joked, "if [Kate's] not your type, you're gay", and began playing the character as such. He tried to subtly flirt with Jack, claiming that this attraction "got [him] through the first half of the season." In the fourth season episode "Meet Kevin Johnson", Tom is seen kissing his New York lover Arturo (Francesco Simone). After the broadcast of "Meet Kevin Johnson", Lindelof and Cuse confirmed that the line from the third season premiere is an allusion to Tom's sexuality, but felt that it needed to be explicitly confirmed in the show, although Lindelof noted that the confirmation scene in "Meet Kevin Johnson" "was not subtle, to say the least". Lost writer Edward Kitsis stated that "It was great to see [Tom] and realize that... he is a true gentleman."

== Reception ==
Chris Carabott from IGN "loved" Tom's first appearance because "It's a great scene and our first introduction to The Others besides Ethan's infiltration of the camp." Gainey found the fan reaction to his first appearance "really tough", because "everywhere [he] went people would just give [him] dirty looks and they were like 'What are you going to do with that boy?'", but he noted this gradually improved after his appearances in season two. Erin Martell from AOL's TV Squad listed Tom in her five "most entertaining guest roles" from the first three seasons, commenting "I am counting his first episode as my favorite. For my money, there was nothing more disturbing than when Gainey showed up out of the blue and uttered the words, 'We're gonna have to take the boy.' I could not get that scene out of my head for days after 'Exodus' aired. Ben has made Tom seem relatively less menacing over time, but I have a feeling that the terrifying, bearded sea captain is still in there somewhere." In her review of the season four episode "The Other Woman", Nikki Stafford of Wizard called the return of her "favorite Other" (Tom) a "highlight". Following his posthumous flashback appearance in "Meet Kevin Johnson", Martell said "Now I feel even worse about his death. He wasn't just one of Ben's scary, Walt-napping minions. He had a heart." Tim Goodman from the San Francisco Chronicle thought the revelation that Tom is gay was a "unique and funny twist". Jay Glatfelter of The Huffington Post noted this revelation "seemed a little oddly placed, kind of like 'Let's make one of our characters gay just for the heck of it' but still it's cool that the show has a perfectly normal (well for an 'Other') not over-the-top gay character."
