= Ana Lucia Cortez =

Fictional character of the TV series Lost

- Lost character
- Michelle Rodriguez as Ana Lucia Cortez in 2005.
- First appearance: "Exodus" (2005)
- Last appearance: "What They Died For" (2010)
- Created by: J. J. Abrams; Damon Lindelof
- Portrayed by: Michelle Rodriguez
- Centric episode(s): "The Other 48 Days" "Collision" "Two for the Road"

In-universe information
- Full name: Ana Lucia Cortez
- Species: Human
- Gender: Female
- Occupation: Police officer in the LAPD; Airport security guard
- Nationality: American
- Former residence: Los Angeles, California, USA

Ana Lucia Cortez is a fictional character on the ABC television series Lost, played by Michelle Rodriguez. Ana Lucia made her first appearance as a guest star in the first season finale, and became part of the main cast for season two. After Oceanic Flight 815 splits in mid-air, the tail section and fuselage crash on opposite sides of a mysterious island. Ana Lucia becomes the leader of the tail section. Flashbacks in her two centric episodes, "Collision" and "Two for the Road", show her life as a police officer before the crash. She is shot and killed by Michael Dawson.

== Arc ==
Prior to the crash, Ana Lucia Cortez is an officer in the Los Angeles Police Department who becomes pregnant, but loses the baby after being shot by a suspect at a burglary scene. She spends several months in physical and psychological therapy, and when the suspect is arrested, she refuses to identify him. After his release, she kills him outside a bar. Ana Lucia decides to leave the force and eventually finds work as an airport security guard. She meets Christian Shephard (John Terry) at the airport bar, who asks her to accompany him to Sydney as a bodyguard, however in Sydney the two part ways. Ana Lucia buys a ticket on Oceanic Flight 815 to return to Los Angeles. In a brief flashback in the first season finale, she flirts with Jack Shephard (Matthew Fox) at a bar at the airport, unaware he is Christian's son. The pair arrange to continue their conversation during the flight. During the flight the plane splits in half, with the two parts crashing on different sides of an island; Ana Lucia is one of the tail section survivors.

The story of how the tail section survivors cope during their first forty-eight days on the Island is shown in "The Other 48 Days". After landing in the ocean, Ana Lucia does her best to help everyone in need. That night, some of the survivors are kidnapped by the Others, the mysterious inhabitants of the Island, then a few nights later, nine more are taken. During the second raid, Ana Lucia kills one of the Others and finds a list on him, which has descriptions of the victims. Suspecting fellow survivor Nathan (Josh Randall) as a traitor, she moves everyone inland, digs a pit and throws him in it until he confesses. Four nights later, Goodwin (Brett Cullen) tricks Nathan and kills him. The small group heads further inland, discovering a bunker known as the Arrow. Ana Lucia and Goodwin trek atop a hill, where she tells Goodwin she has worked out he is the real traitor. After a struggle, she impales him on a broken stick, then returns to the group and tells them they are safe. Fellow tail section survivors Libby (Cynthia Watros) and Cindy (Kimberley Joseph) bring Jin (Daniel Dae Kim) to her after discovering him washed up on shore. He breaks free, so Ana Lucia follows and finds Michael (Harold Perrineau) and Sawyer (Josh Holloway). Jin, Michael and Sawyer are thrown into the pit, and Ana Lucia follows, pretending to have also been captured. Once she believes they are fellow 815 survivors she releases them, and they travel to the camp of the other survivors. When they near the camp, Ana Lucia mistakes Shannon (Maggie Grace) for an Other and fatally shoots her. The on-island events of "Collision" show her guilt after Shannon's death. She has Shannon's lover Sayid (Naveen Andrews) tied up and refuses to let the group move on. After some reasoning from Libby, she reluctantly lets them go. She is invited into a bunker the fuselage survivors found to interrogate a man claiming to be Henry Gale (Michael Emerson), and manages to receive a map to his crashed balloon. She takes Sayid and Charlie (Dominic Monaghan) with her, and eventually discovers the crash site, and the body of the real Henry Gale. In her second centric episode, "Two for the Road", Ana Lucia attempts to speak to Henry again, but she is assaulted by him and nearly killed. Seeking revenge, she seduces Sawyer and steals his gun. She returns to the hatch and attempts to kill Henry, but is unable to bring herself to do it. She confides in Michael, who offers to kill him on her behalf.

But when Ana hands him the gun, he shoots her in the heart, killing her. She is buried next to Libby, who was also killed by Michael – tasks the Others require of him in his effort to free his son from them. After Ana's death, she makes three further appearances; in a dream to Mr. Eko (Adewale Akinnuoye-Agbaje) in "?", as a vision that Hurley (Jorge Garcia) has in "The Lie", and in a flash sideways in "What They Died For".

== Personality ==
Ana Lucia was described by Melanie McFarland of the Seattle Post-Intelligencer as "demanding", "hostile" and a "bully". She called Ana Lucia a "brooding, broken ex-cop" with a "perpetual scowl". McFarland described the character as someone with a "take-charge nature", and an "inability to be reasoned away from her dictatorial decisions". Anna Johns from AOL's TV Squad felt Ana Lucia is "abrasive and lacking common sense or civility". C. K. Sample, also from TV Squad, thought Ana Lucia was "angry", "power mad" and a "total nut job". According to supervising producer Leonard Dick, "Ana Lucia is somebody who does not want to be a victim. She was a victim once and she swore to herself she would never be a victim again". Rodriguez described the character as "very intuitive", adding "I like that the character is pretty much always aware and suspicious". She is "street smart" and has a "speak-her-mind quality".

== Development ==
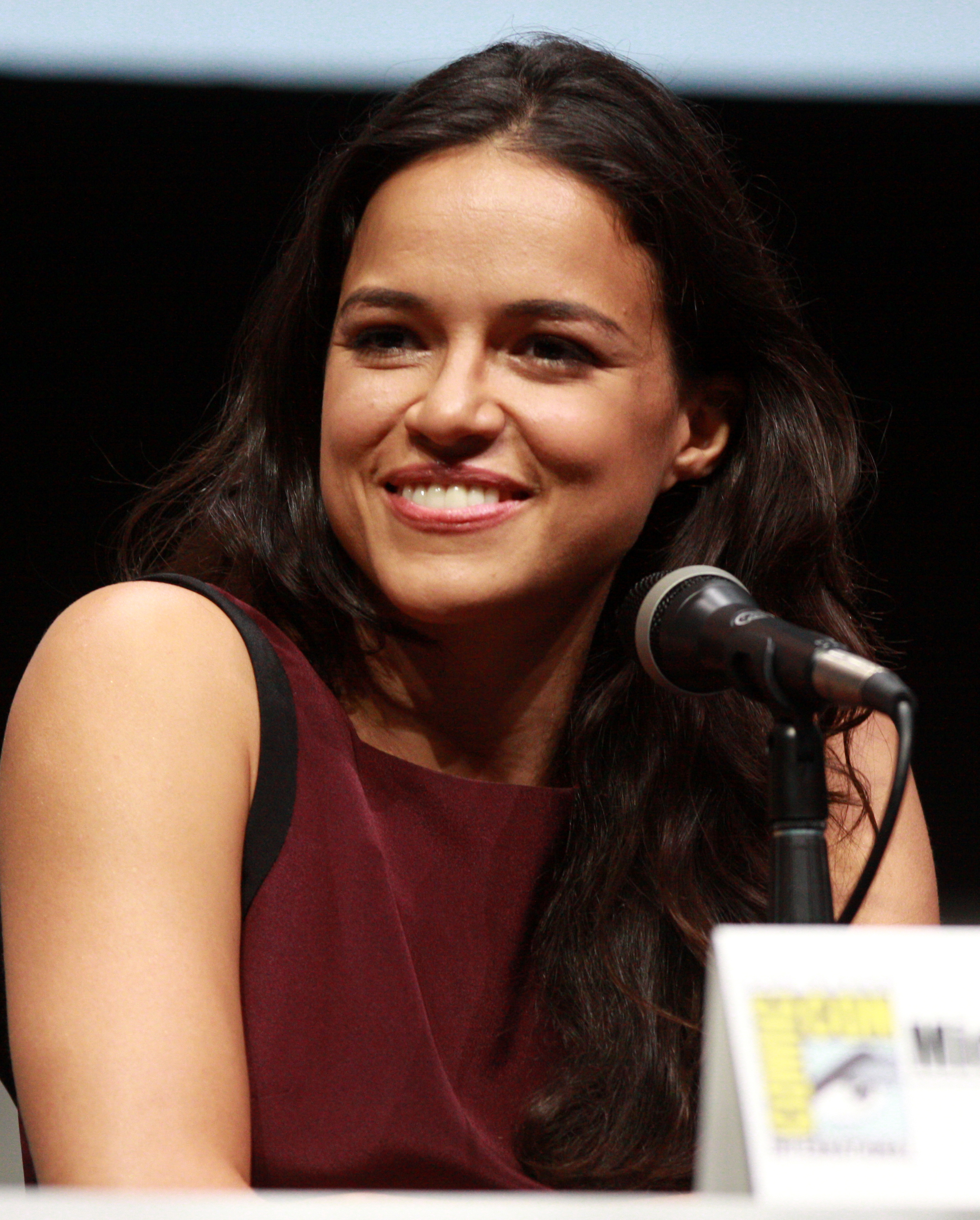
Rodriguez joined the cast at the end of the first season.

=== Casting ===
In February 2005, Lost producers began looking for a Latina woman in her mid-thirties who would be the leader of the tail section, and a romantic interest for Jack. The agent of Michelle Rodriguez (who was 26 at the time) called the producers, informing them Rodriguez was interested in the role. She said she was potentially interested in doing television, and felt she had been typecast in tough female roles, so she wanted this role to be different.

=== Characterization ===
Ana Lucia was planned to start as a tough character, because that is what the audience would expect, then the layers of the character would be gradually peeled back. Rodriguez described Ana Lucia as an "animalistic type creature... tamed by the Island." They reconstructed the character slightly to fit what they liked about Rodriguez, such as making her more "street smart" with a "speak-her-mind quality." Ana Lucia made her first appearance in the penultimate episode of season one, in order to set up her character becoming part of the cast in the next season.

All Rodriguez was told about her character was both she and her mother were in the police force. Ana Lucia's style of leadership deliberately contrasts Jack's; Jack is a reluctant leader, whereas Ana Lucia quickly takes charge on her own. In her early appearances, Ana Lucia is shown to be very tough, so the flashbacks in "Collision", where it is revealed she lost her baby, were used to show a softer side to her.

Rodriguez's character was designed from the beginning as a "love-to-hate character", as Cuse remarked in a November 2005 podcast. Lindelof further described the character's intentional role as a "persona non grata in our society for some time to come" as a result of Shannon (Maggie Grace)'s death and becoming integrated into the fuselage camp. Cuse harkened the intentions behind her arc as a mirror to Sawyer (Josh Holloway)'s in the first season, with Cuse stating, "...we sort of set up an expectation for the character, and then we like to try to challenge whatever that first expectation that you have for that character by giving you more information that maybe helps you come to a different conclusion."

The producers planned for her character to develop a romantic storyline with Jack (Matthew Fox) as part of a "love rectangle" with Kate and Sawyer. They also planned for a romantic storyline with the "most unexpected" person on The Island prior to this. In a February 2006 GQ interview, Fox described the Jack-Ana Lucia coupling as potentially going into a darker direction, such as committing killing sprees in the same vein as the film Natural Born Killers (1994) or Bonnie and Clyde.

They attempted to rework the storyline with Juliet (Elizabeth Mitchell, though after "The Other Woman", Lindelof felt the relationship was contrived and ended it as well.

=== Exit ===
After the character was killed off, producers Damon Lindelof and Carlton Cuse claimed that Rodriguez was only interested in one season during their first meeting with her (alongside co-creator J. J. Abrams) because she was a "nomadic spirit", but would like to do one "kickass arc" as she called it. The producers liked her energy, and in turn, they remarked upon agreeing with the plan to kill Ana Lucia off at the end of the season. Rodriguez, however, stated they actually wanted to give the storyline "some time", until the middle of the third season, but she was "ready to go". Although she also corroborated remarks that she initially planned on doing one year as well.

Later, in a 2020 podcast, Lindelof amended this and revealed Rodriguez expressed interest in continuing the role beyond her one-season deal midway through the season (shortly following the DUI charges), but he informed her they had already planned her death storyline. Previously, in a December 2006 interview however, Rodriguez stated she was informed two weeks before they shot the episode that her character was being killed off. She remarked how hard it was to keep it from the cast who were discussing their storylines next season for the two week interval.

When it came time to kill off Ana Lucia, the producers also claimed the character of Libby was killed at the same time to generate emotional impact. This happened amidst rumours that the characters were killed off because both actresses in question had been arrested for DUI while filming on location in Oahu. The producers denied that Ana Lucia was killed off because of Rodriguez's behaviour on set, saying although they had no interaction with her, they had been told she had been professional. Rodriguez felt comfortable on the series, but was happy to leave as she felt this would help her grow personally, and become a woman. She had mixed feelings about leaving Hawaii, where Lost is filmed; her allergies were hard to deal with, but she loved the scenery.

== Reception ==
"I was pissed off, I just signed on to the show, and everybody's going to hate me! What am I — the bad guy now?"

— Actress Michelle Rodriguez, who plays Ana Lucia, on the subject of her character killing Shannon Rutherford.

Melanie McFarland from Seattle Post-Intelligencer described Ana Lucia as "one of the most intensely hated characters on television [in the] fall [of 2005]", due to her being "hostile" and a "bully". She added Ana Lucia murdering Shannon, "the least deserving of sympathy of all the previously known survivors", made fans hate Ana Lucia even more. McFarland found this makes "the creation of her character, and Rodriguez's hire, strokes of brilliant writing and casting on the part of Lost producers J.J. Abrams and Damon Lindelof", and described her as a "hero stewed in pathos". Anna Johns from TV Squad was unhappy at the prospect of Ana Lucia's death, feeling Ana Lucia was important because she was a "love to hate" character, she disrupted the Jack-Kate-Sawyer love triangle, and created conflicts, which make the show interesting. Amy Amatangelo from Zap2it admitted she "enjoyed kind of loathing Ana Lucia". In a later article, she described Ana Lucia's death as "a brilliant move", because "one of their own become one of them". She added "nobody liked the Ana Lucia character anyway", but that did not stop it being "one of [the second] season's most jaw-dropping moments". Alan Stanley Blair from SyFy Portal "cheered when she was shot". Ana Lucia's death was second in IGN's list of the top ten Lost deaths, as she made an "immediate impact on the series" with an "unexpected end". On the second season DVD, supervising producer Leonard Dick says "Michelle brought real strength, a dynamic element, to the role". In 2006, Michelle Rodriguez co-won the Screen Actors Guild Award for Outstanding Performance by an Ensemble in a Drama Series with the cast of Lost. She also won an ALMA Award for Outstanding Supporting Actress in a Television Series.
