= Cinema Audio Society Award for Outstanding Achievement in Sound Mixing for Television Series – One Hour =

Annual US television award

- Country: United States
- Presented by: Cinema Audio Society
- Currently held by: Phillip W. Palmer, Larry Benjamin, Kevin Valentine, Chris Navarro, Stacey Michaels – Better Call Saul (2022)

The Cinema Audio Society Award for Outstanding Achievement in Sound Mixing for Television Series – One Hour is an annual award given by the Cinema Audio Society to live action motion picture sound mixer for their outstanding achievements in sound mixing. The award came to its current title in 2013, when one hour and half hour series were separated into two categories. Before this, the category was labeled Outstanding Achievement in Sound Mixing for Television Series, and was given annually starting in 1994, for series' episodes aired the previous year.

== Winners and nominees ==
=== 1990s ===
Outstanding Achievement in Sound Mixing for Television Pictures

| Year | Program | Episode(s) | Nominees | Network |
|---|---|---|---|---|
| 1993 (1st) | Star Trek: The Next Generation | "Descent, Parts 1 & 2" | Alan Bernard (production mixer); Chris Haire, Doug Davey, Richard L. Morrison (re-recording mixers) | Syndicated |
| 1993 (1st) | Lois & Clark: The New Adventures of Superman | "Pilot" | Kenn Fuller (production mixer); David E. Fluhr, John Asman, Melissa Sherwood Hofmann (re-recording mixers) | ABC |
| 1993 (1st) | NYPD Blue | "Pilot" | Mark Server (production mixer); Robert Appere, Kenneth R. Burton, Gary D. Rogers, Dan Hiland (re-recording mixera) | ABC |
| 1993 (1st) | Northern Exposure | "Kaddish for Uncle Manny" | Robert Marts (production mixer); R. Russell Smith, Greg Orloff, Anthony D'Amico (re-recording mixers) | CBS |
| 1993 (1st) | Return to Lonesome Dove | "The Vision" | Clark King, Donald F. Johnson (production mixers); Thomas J. Huth, Sam Black, David M. Weishaar (re-recording mixers) | CBS |
| 1994 (2nd) | NYPD Blue | "Simone Says" | Joe Kenworthy (production mixer); Robert Appere, Kenneth R. Burton (re-recording mixers) | ABC |
| 1994 (2nd) | ER | "Blizzard" | Russell C. Fager (production mixer); Allen L. Stone, Franklin Jones Jr., Michael Jiron (re-recording mixers) | NBC |
| 1994 (2nd) | Lois & Clark: The New Adventures of Superman | "Wall of Sound" | Kenn Fuller (production mixer); Dan Hiland, Joseph D. Citarella (re-recording mixers) | ABC |
| 1994 (2nd) | Northern Exposure | "Fish Story" | Robert Marts, Glenn Micallef (production mixers); R. Russell Smith, Greg Orloff, Anthony D'Amico (re-recording mixers) | CBS |
| 1994 (2nd) | Star Trek: The Next Generation | "Genesis" | Alan Bernard (production mixer); Chris Haire, Doug Davey, Richard L. Morrison (re-recording mixers) | Syndicated |
| 1995 (3rd) | ER | "Hell and High Water" | Will Yarbrough (production mixer); Allen L. Stone, Franklin Jones Jr., Michael Jiron (re-recording mixers) | NBC |
| 1995 (3rd) | American Gothic | "Damned If You Don't" | Richard Van Dyke (production mixer); David E. Fluhr, John Asman, Sam Black (re-recording mixers) | CBS |
| 1995 (3rd) | Murder One | "Chapter Three" | Susan Moore-Chong (production mixer); Robert Appere, Kenneth R. Burton (re-recording mixers) | ABC |
| 1995 (3rd) | NYPD Blue | "Heavin' Can Wait" | Joe Kenworthy (production mixer); Robert Appere, Kenneth R. Burton (re-recording mixers) | ABC |
| 1995 (3rd) | The X-Files | "Humbug" | Michael T. Williamson (production mixer); Marti D. Humphrey, Gary D. Rogers (re-recording mixers) | Fox |
| 1996 (4th) | NYPD Blue | "Unembraceable You" | Joe Kenworthy (production mixer); Robert Appere, Kenneth R. Burton (re-recording mixers) | ABC |
| 1996 (4th) | Babylon 5 | "Severed Dreams" | Linda Coffey (production mixer); Terry O'Bright, Keith Rogers (re-recording mixers) | PTEN |
| 1996 (4th) | Chicago Hope | "Quiet Riot" | Russell C. Fager (production mixer); Greg Orloff, R. Russell Smith (re-recording mixers) | CBS |
| 1996 (4th) | ER | "Fear of Flying" | Lowell Harris (production mixer); Allen L. Stone, Franklin Jones Jr., Michael Jiron (re-recording mixers) | NBC |
| 1996 (4th) | The X-Files | "Tunguska" | Michael T. Williamson (production mixer); David John West, Nello Torri, Doug E. Turner (re-recording mixers) | Fox |
| 1997 (5th) | Chicago Hope | "Brain Salad Surgery" | Russell C. Fager (production mixer); R. Russell Smith, William Freesh (re-recording mixers) | CBS |
| 1997 (5th) | NYPD Blue | "Dead Man Talking" | Joe Kenworthy (production mixer); Robert Appere, Kenneth R. Burton (re-recording mixers) | ABC |
| 1997 (5th) | Star Trek: Voyager | "Future's End" | Alan Bernard (production mixer); Chris Haire, Doug Davey, Richard L. Morrison (re-recording mixers) | UPN |
| 1997 (5th) | Nash Bridges | "Sniper" | Agamemnon Andrianos (production mixer); Sherry Klein, Robert Edmondson, Joel Fein (re-recording mixer) | CBS |
| 1997 (5th) | The X-Files | "The Post-Modern Prometheus" | Michael T. Williamson (production mixer); David John West, Harry Andronis, Kurt Kassulke (re-recording mixers) | Fox |
| 1998 (6th) | Buffy the Vampire Slayer | "Lovers Walk" | David Yaffe (production mixer); Kevin Patrick Burns, Todd Orr, Ron Evans (re-recording mixers) | The WB |
| 1998 (6th) | Ally McBeal | "Making Spirits Bright" | Paul Lewis (production mixer); Nello Torri, Peter Kelsey (re-recording mixer) | Fox |
| 1998 (6th) | Chicago Hope | "One Hundred and One Damnations" | Russell C. Fager (production mixer); R. Russell Smith, William Freesh (re-recording mixers) | CBS |
| 1998 (6th) | JAG | "Gypsy Eyes" | Sean Rush (production mixer); Tim Philben, Ross Davis, Grover B. Helsley (re-recording mixer) | CBS |
| 1998 (6th) | ER | "Exodus" | Lowell Harris (production mixer); Allen L. Stone, Franklin Jones Jr., Michael Jiron (re-recording mixers) | NBC |
| 1998 (6th) | NYPD Blue | "Hearts and Souls" | Joe Kenworthy (production mixer); Elmo Ponsdomenech, J. Stanley Johnston (re-recording mixers) | ABC |
| 1999 (7th) | The Sopranos | "I Dream of Jeannie Cusamano" | Mathew Price (production mixer); Adam Sawelson, Todd Orr, Ron Evans (re-recording mixers) | HBO |
| 1999 (7th) | ER | "The Storm (Part II)" | Marc A. Gilmartin (production mixer); Allen L. Stone, Dave Concors, Michael Jiron (re-recording mixer) | NBC |
| 1999 (7th) | The West Wing | "In Excelsis Deo" | Kenneth B. Ross (production mixer); Gary D. Rogers, Dan Hiland (re-recording mixers) | NBC |
| 1999 (7th) | Star Trek: Voyager | "Equinox, Part I" | Alan Bernard (production mixer); Chris Haire, Doug Davey, Richard L. Morrison (re-recording mixers) | UPN |
| 1999 (7th) | The X-Files | "The Unnatural" | Steve Cantamessa (production mixer); David John West, Harry Andronis, Kurt Kassulke (re-recording mixers) | Fox |

=== 2000s ===
| Year | Program | Episode(s) | Nominees | Network |
|---|---|---|---|---|
| 2000 (8th) | The West Wing | "In the Shadow of Two Gunmen, Parts I & II" | Mark Weingarten (production mixer); Gary D. Rogers, Dan Hiland (re-recording mixers) | NBC |
| 2000 (8th) | CSI: Crime Scene Investigation | "Crate 'n Burial" | Michael Fowler (production mixer); Larry Benjamin, Ross Davis, Grover B. Helsley (re-recording mixers) | CBS |
| 2000 (8th) | Law & Order | "Standoff" | Richard Murphy (production mixer); Bill Nicholson, Thomas Meloeny (re-recording mixers) | NBC |
| 2000 (8th) | Star Trek: Voyager | "Unimatrix Zero" | Alan Bernard (production mixer); Chris Haire, Doug Davey, Richard L. Morrison (re-recording mixers) | UPN |
| 2000 (8th) | The Sopranos | "Commendatori" | Mathew Price (production mixer); Todd Orr, Kevin Patrick Burns, (re-recording mixers) | HBO |
| 2001 (9th) | Six Feet Under | "Pilot" | Richard Van Dyke (production mixer); Peter Reale, Roberta Doheny (re-recording mixers) | HBO |
| 2001 (9th) | CSI: Crime Scene Investigation | "Caged" | Michael Fowler (production mixer); Yuri Reese, William Smith (re-recording mixers) | CBS |
| 2001 (9th) | Law & Order | "Soldier of Fortune" | Richard Murphy (production mixer); Bill Nicholson, Thomas Meloeny (re-recording mixers) | NBC |
| 2001 (9th) | NYPD Blue | "Johnny Got His Gold" | Joe Kenworthy (production mixer); Pete Elia, J. Stanley Johnston (re-recording mixers) | ABC |
| 2001 (9th) | The Sopranos | "Pine Barrens" | Mathew Price (production mixer); Todd Orr, Kevin Patrick Burns, Fred Tator (re-recording mixers) | HBO |
| 2002 (10th) | The West Wing | "Posse Comitatus" | Patrick Hanson (production mixer); Gary D. Rogers, Dan Hiland (re-recording mixers) | NBC |
| 2002 (10th) | 24 | "11:00 p.m. – 12:00 a.m." | William Gocke (production mixer); Mike Olman, Kenneth Kobett (re-recording mixers) | Fox |
| 2002 (10th) | The X-Files | "The Truth" | Steve Cantamessa (production mixer); David John West, Harry Andronis, Brian Harman (re-recording mixers) | Fox |
| 2002 (10th) | Alias | "Cipher" | Douglas Axtell (production mixer); Robert Appere, Ed Carr (re-recording mixers) | ABC |
| 2002 (10th) | CSI: Crime Scene Investigation | "Fight Night" | Michael Fowler (production mixer); Yuri Reese, William Smith (re-recording mixers) | CBS |
| 2002 (10th) | Six Feet Under | "The Last Time" | Steven A. Morrow (production mixer); Peter Reale, Roberta Doheny (re-recording mixers) | HBO |
| 2003 (11th) | 24 | "Day 3: 5:00 p.m. - 6:00 p.m." | William Gocke (production mixer); Mike Olman, Kenneth Kobett (re-recording mixers) | Fox |
| 2003 (11th) | Alias | "Succession" | Douglas Axtell (production mixer); Robert Appere, Ed Carr (re-recording mixers) | ABC |
| 2003 (11th) | NYPD Blue | "Shear Stupidity" | Joe Kenworthy (production mixer); Pete Elia, Kurt Kassulke (re-recording mixers) | ABC |
| 2003 (11th) | Six Feet Under | "I'm Sorry, I'm Lost" | Bo Harwood (production mixer); Elmo Ponsdomenech, Joe Earle (re-recording mixers) | HBO |
| 2003 (11th) | CSI: Crime Scene Investigation | "Grissom Versus the Volcano" | Michael Fowler (production mixer); Yuri Reese, William Smith (re-recording mixers) | CBS |
| 2004 (12th) | Deadwood | "Deadwood" | Geoffrey Patterson (production mixer); William Freesh, R. Russell Smith (re-recording mixers) | HBO |
| 2004 (12th) | 24 | "Day 3: 6:00 a.m. - 7:00 a.m." | William Gocke (production mixer); Mike Olman, Kenneth Kobett (re-recording mixers) | Fox |
| 2004 (12th) | The Sopranos | "Irregular Around the Margins" | Mathew Price (production mixer); Todd Orr, Kevin Patrick Burns (re-recording mixers) | HBO |
| 2004 (12th) | Alias | "Unveiled" | Douglas Axtell (production mixer); Robert Appere, Ed Carr (re-recording mixers) | ABC |
| 2004 (12th) | Lost | "Pilot (Part 1)" | David Yaffe (production mixer); Scott Weber, Frank Morrone (re-recording mixers) | ABC |
| 2005 (13th) | Deadwood | "A Lie Agreed Upon (Part I)" | Geoffrey Patterson (production mixer); William Freesh, R. Russell Smith (re-recording mixers) | HBO |
| 2005 (13th) | 24 | "Day 4: 6:00 a.m. - 7:00 a.m." | William Gocke (production mixer); Mike Olman, Kenneth Kobett (re-recording mixers) | Fox |
| 2005 (13th) | CSI: Crime Scene Investigation | "Grave Danger: Part 2" | Michael Fowler (production mixer); Yuri Reese, William Smith (re-recording mixers) | CBS |
| 2005 (13th) | Rome | "The Spoils" | Maurizio Argentieri (production mixer); William Freesh, R. Russell Smith (re-recording mixers) | HBO |
| 2005 (13th) | The West Wing | "2162 Votes" | Patrick Hanson (production mixer); Gary D. Rogers, Dan Hiland (re-recording mixers) | NBC |
| 2006 (14th) | Deadwood | "A Two-Headed Beast" | Geoffrey Patterson (production mixer); William Freesh, R. Russell Smith (re-recording mixers) | HBO |
| 2006 (14th) | 24 | "Day 5: 7:00 a.m. - 8:00 a.m." | William Gocke (production mixer); Mike Olman, Kenneth Kobett (re-recording mixers) | Fox |
| 2006 (14th) | Heroes | "Genesis" | Kenn Fuller (production mixer); Gerry Lentz, Richard Weingart (re-recording mixers) | NBC |
| 2006 (14th) | Lost | "I Do" | Robert J. Anderson Jr. (production mixer); Scott Weber, Frank Morrone (re-recording mixers) | ABC |
| 2006 (14th) | The Sopranos | "Members Only" | Mathew Price (production mixer); Todd Orr, Kevin Patrick Burns (re-recording mixers) | HBO |
| 2007 (15th) | CSI: Crime Scene Investigation | "Living Doll" | Michael Fowler (production mixer); Yuri Reese, William Smith (re-recording mixers) | CBS |
| 2007 (15th) | 24 | "Day 6: 10:00 p.m. – 11:00 p.m." | William Gocke (production mixer); Mike Olman, Kenneth Kobett (re-recording mixers) | Fox |
| 2007 (15th) | Jericho | "Why We Fight" | Phillip W. Palmer (production mixer); Sherry Klein, Fred Tator (re-recording mixers) | CBS |
| 2007 (15th) | Scrubs | "My Musical" | Joe Foglia (production mixer); John W. Cook II, Peter Nusbaum (re-recording mixerS) | NBC |
| 2007 (15th) | The Sopranos | "The Blue Comet" | Mathew Price (production mixer); Todd Orr, Kevin Patrick Burns (re-recording mixers) | HBO |
| 2008 (16th) | 24 | "Redemption" | William Gocke (production mixer); Mike Olman, Kenneth Kobett (re-recording mixers) | Fox |
| 2008 (16th) | Dexter | "Turning Biminese" | Roger Pietschmann (production mixer); Elmo Ponsdomenech, Kevin Roache (re-recording mixers) | Showtime |
| 2008 (16th) | House | "Last Resort" | Von Varga (production mixer); Gerry Lentz, Richard Weingart (re-recording mixers) | Fox |
| 2008 (16th) | Lost | "Meet Kevin Johnson" | Robert J. Anderson Jr. (production mixer); Scott Weber, Frank Morrone (re-recording mixers) | ABC |
| 2008 (16th) | Mad Men | "The Jet Set" | Peter Bentley (production mixer); Ken Teaney, Geoffrey G. Rubay (re-recording mixers) | AMC |
| 2009 (17th) | Mad Men | "Guy Walks Into an Advertising Agency" | Peter Bentley (production mixer); Ken Teaney, Geoffrey G. Rubay (re-recording mixers) | AMC |
| 2009 (17th) | 24 | "Day 7: 10:00 p.m. - 11:00 p.m." | William Gocke (production mixer); Mike Olman, Kenneth Kobett (re-recording mixers) | Fox |
| 2009 (17th) | Glee | "Wheels" | Phillip W. Palmer (production mixer); Joe Earle, Doug Andham (re-recording mixers) | Fox |
| 2009 (17th) | Battlestar Galactica | "Daybreak, Part 2" | Rick Bal (production mixer); Mike Olman, Kenneth Kobett (re-recording mixers) | Sci-Fi |
| 2009 (17th) | Desperate Housewives | "Boom Crunch" | Agamemnon Andrianos (production mixer); Mike Olman, Kenneth Kobett (re-recording mixers) | ABC |

=== 2010s ===
| Year | Program | Episode(s) | Nominees | Network |
|---|---|---|---|---|
| 2010 (18th) | Boardwalk Empire | "A Return to Normalcy" | Frank Stettner (production mixer), Tom Fleischman (re-recording mixer) | HBO |
| 2010 (18th) | 24 | "Day 8: 3:00 p.m. - 4:00 p.m." | William Gocke (production mixer); Mike Olman, Kenneth Kobett (re-recording mixers) | Fox |
| 2010 (18th) | Glee | "The Power of Madonna" | Phillip W. Palmer (production mixer); Joe Earle, Doug Andham (re-recording mixers) | Fox |
| 2010 (18th) | Dexter | "Take It!" | Greg Agalsoff (production mixer); Pete Elia, Kevin Roache (re-recording mixers) | Showtime |
| 2010 (18th) | Modern Family | "Chirp" | Stephen Tibbo (production mixer), Dean Okrand (re-recording mixer) | ABC |
| 2011 (19th) | Boardwalk Empire | "To the Lost" | Frank Stettner (production mixer), Tom Fleischman (re-recording mixer) | HBO |
| 2011 (19th) | Breaking Bad | "Face Off" | Darryl L. Frank (production mixer); Jeffrey Perkins, Eric Justen (re-recording mixers) | AMC |
| 2011 (19th) | The Walking Dead | "What Lies Ahead" | Bartek Swiatek (production mixer); Gary D. Rogers, Dan Hiland (re-recording mixers) | AMC |
| 2011 (19th) | Dexter | "Just Let Go" | Greg Agalsoff (production mixer); Pete Elia, Kevin Roache (re-recording mixers) | Showtime |
| 2011 (19th) | Game of Thrones | "Baelor" | Ronan Hill (production mixer), Mark Taylor (re-recording mixer) | HBO |

Outstanding Achievement in Sound Mixing for Television Series – One Hour

| Year | Program | Episode(s) | Nominees | Network |
|---|---|---|---|---|
| 2012 (20th) | Homeland | "Beirut Is Back" | Larry Long (production mixer); Nello Torri, Alan Decker (re-recording mixers); Paul Drenning (adr mixer); Shawn Kennelly (foley mixer) | Showtime |
| 2012 (20th) | Boardwalk Empire | "The Milkmaid's Lot" | Frank Stettner (production mixer), Tom Fleischman (re-recording mixer) | HBO |
| 2012 (20th) | Game of Thrones | "Blackwater" | Ronan Hill (production mixer); Onnalee Blank, Mathew Waters (re-recording mixers); Brett Voss (foley mixer) | HBO |
| 2012 (20th) | Breaking Bad | "Dead Freight" | Darryl L. Frank (production mixer); Jeffrey Perkins, Eric Justen (re-recording mixers); Eric Gotthelf (adr mixer); Stacey Michaels (foley mixer) | AMC |
| 2012 (20th) | Mad Men | "Commissions and Fees" | Peter Bentley (production mixer); Ken Teaney, Alec St. John (re-recording mixers) | AMC |
| 2013 (21st) | Game of Thrones | "The Rains of Castamere" | Ronan Hill, Richard Dyer (production mixers); Onnalee Blank, Mathew Waters (re-recording mixers); Brett Voss (foley mixer) | HBO |
| 2013 (21st) | Homeland | "Good Night" | Larry Long (production mixer); Nello Torri, Alan Decker (re-recording mixers); Mark DeSimone, Paul Drenning (adr mixers); Shawn Kennelly (foley mixer) | Showtime |
| 2013 (21st) | Boardwalk Empire | "Erlkönig" | Frank Stettner (production mixer), Tom Fleischman (re-recording mixer), Mark DeSimone (adr mixer), George Lara (foley mixer) | HBO |
| 2013 (21st) | Breaking Bad | "Felina" | Darryl L. Frank (production mixer); Jeffrey Perkins, Eric Justen (re-recording mixers); Eric Gotthelf (adr mixer); Stacey Michaels (foley mixer) | AMC |
| 2013 (21st) | The Walking Dead | "Home" | Michael P. Clark (production mixer); Gary D. Rogers, Dan Hiland (re-recording mixers); Greg Crawford, Eric Gotthelf (adr mixers); Stacey Michaels (foley mixer) | AMC |
| 2014 (22nd) | Game of Thrones | "The Children" | Ronan Hill, Richard Dyer (production mixers); Onnalee Blank, Mathew Waters (re-recording mixers); Brett Voss (foley mixer) | HBO |
| 2014 (22nd) | Homeland | "Redux" | Diethard Keck (production mixer); Nello Torri, Alan Decker (re-recording mixers); Stephen Webster (adr mixer); Shawn Kennelly (foley mixer) | Showtime |
| 2014 (22nd) | Boardwalk Empire | "Friendless Child" | Frank Stettner (production mixer), Tom Fleischman (re-recording mixer), Mark DeSimone (adr mixer), George Lara (foley mixer) | HBO |
| 2014 (22nd) | True Detective | "Who Goes There" | Geoffrey Patterson (production mixer), Martin Czembor (re-recording mixer), Bobby Johanson (adr mixer), Matt Haasch (foley mixer) | HBO |
| 2014 (22nd) | The Walking Dead | "No Sanctuary" | Michael P. Clark (production mixer); Gary D. Rogers, Dan Hiland (re-recording mixers) | AMC |
| 2015 (23rd) | Game of Thrones | "Hardhome" | Ronan Hill, Richard Dyer (production mixers); Onnalee Blank, Mathew Waters (re-recording mixers); Brett Voss (foley mixer) | HBO |
| 2015 (23rd) | Better Call Saul | "Marco" | Phillip W. Palmer (production mixer); Larry B. Benjamin, Kevin Valentine (re-recording mixers); Matt Hovland (adr mixer); David Torres (foley mixer) | AMC |
| 2015 (23rd) | The Walking Dead | "First Time Again" | Michael P. Clark (production mixer); Gary D. Rogers, Dan Hiland (re-recording mixers); Eric Gotthelf (adr mixer) | AMC |
| 2015 (23rd) | Homeland | "The Tradition of Hospitality" | Ed Cantú (production mixer); Nello Torri, Alan Decker (re-recording mixers); Paul Drenning (adr mixer); Shawn Kennelly (foley mixer) | Showtime |
| 2015 (23rd) | House of Cards | "Chapter 27" | Lorenzo Millan (production mixer); Nathan Nance, Scott R. Lewis (re-recording mixers); Corey Tyler (foley mixer) | Netflix |
| 2016 (24th) | Game of Thrones | "Battle of the Bastards" | Ronan Hill, Richard Dyer (production mixers); Onnalee Blank, Mathew Waters (re-recording mixers); Brett Voss (foley mixer) | HBO |
| 2016 (24th) | Better Call Saul | "Klick" | Phillip W. Palmer (production mixer); Larry B. Benjamin, Kevin Valentine (re-recording mixers); Matt Hovland (adr mixer); David Torres (foley mixer) | AMC |
| 2016 (24th) | Mr. Robot | "eps2.8_h1dden-pr0cess.axx" | William Sarokin (production mixer); John W. Cook II, William Freesh (re-recording mixers); Beauxregard Neylon, Paul Drenning (adr mixers); Mike Marino (foley mixer) | USA |
| 2016 (24th) | Westworld | "The Original" | John Pritchett (production mixer); Keith Rogers, Scott Weber (re-recording mixers); Mark Kondracki (adr mixer); Geordy Sincavage, Ryan M. Wassil (foley mixers) | HBO |
| 2016 (24th) | Stranger Things | "Chapter Seven: The Bath Tub" | Chris Durfy (production mixer); Joe Barnett, Adam Jenkins (re-recording mixers); Judah Getz (adr mixer); John Guentner (foley mixer) | Netflix |
| 2017 (25th) | Game of Thrones | "Beyond the Wall" | Ronan Hill, Richard Dyer (production mixers); Onnalee Blank, Mathew Waters (re-recording mixers); Brett Voss (foley mixer) | HBO |
| 2017 (25th) | Better Call Saul | "Lantern" | Phillip W. Palmer (production mixer); Larry B. Benjamin, Kevin Valentine (re-recording mixers); Matt Hovland (adr mixer); David Torres (foley mixer) | AMC |
| 2017 (25th) | The Crown | "Misadventure" | Chris Ashworth (production mixer); Stuart Hilliker, Martin Jensen, Lee Walpole (re-recording mixers); Rory de Carteret (adr mixer); Philip Clements (foley mixer) | Netflix |
| 2017 (25th) | Stranger Things | "Chapter Eight: The Mind Flayer" | Michael P. Clark (production mixer); Joe Barnett, Adam Jenkins (re-recording mixers); Bill Higley (adr mixer); Antony Zeller (foley mixer) | Netflix |
| 2017 (25th) | The Handmaid's Tale | "Offred" | John J. Thomson (production mixer); Lou Solakofski, Joe Morrow (re-recording mixers); Scott Smith (scoring mixer); Don White (foley mixer) | Hulu |
| 2018 (26th) | The Marvelous Mrs. Maisel | "Vote for Kennedy, Vote for Kennedy" | Mathew Price (production mixer), Ron Bochar (re-recording mixer), Stewart Lerman (scoring mixer), David Boulton (adr mixer), George Lara (foley mixer) | Amazon |
| 2018 (26th) | Better Call Saul | "Talk" | Phillip W. Palmer (production mixer); Larry B. Benjamin, Kevin Valentine (re-recording mixers); Chris Navarro (adr mixer); Stacey Michaels (foley mixer) | AMC |
| 2018 (26th) | Westworld | "The Passenger" | Geoffrey Patterson, Roger V. Stevenson (production mixers); Keith Rogers, Andy King (re-recording mixers); Michael Botha (adr mixer); Geordy Sincavage (foley mixer) | HBO |
| 2018 (26th) | The Handmaid's Tale | "Holly" | Sylvain Arseneault (production mixer); Joe Morrow, Lou Solakofski (re-recording mixers); Scott Smith, Adam Taylor (scoring mixers); Mark DeSimone (adr mixer); Jack Heeren (foley mixer) | Hulu |
| 2018 (26th) | Ozark | "The Badger" | Felipe Borrero (production mixer); Larry B. Benjamin, Kevin Valentine (re-recording mixers); Phil McGowan (scoring mixer); Matt Hovland (adr mixer); David Torres (foley mixer) | Netflix |
| 2019 (27th) | Game of Thrones | "The Bells" | Daniel Crowley, Ronan Hill, Simon Kerr (production mixers); Onnalee Blank, Matthew Waters (re-recording mixers); Brett Voss (foley mixer) | HBO |
| 2019 (27th) | The Handmaid's Tale | "Heroic" | Sylvain Arseneault (production mixer); Joe Morrow, Lou Solakofski (re-recording mixers); Scott Smith, Adam Taylor (scoring mixers); Andrea Rusch (adr mixer); Kevin Schultz (foley mixer) | Hulu |
| 2019 (27th) | Peaky Blinders | "Mr. Jones" | Stu Wright (production mixer); Nigel Heath, Brad Rees (re-recording mixers); Jimmy Robertson (scoring mixer); Oliver Brierley (adr mixer); Ciaran Smith (foley mixer) | Netflix |
| 2019 (27th) | Stranger Things | "Chapter Eight: The Battle of Starcourt" | Michael Rayle (production mixer); Will Files, Mark Paterson (re-recording mixers); Hector Carlos Ramirez (scoring mixer); Bill Higley (adr mixer); Peter Persuad (foley mixer) | Netflix |
| 2019 (27th) | Tom Clancy's Jack Ryan | "Persona Non Grata" | Michael Barosky (production mixer); Daniel Leahy, Steve Pederson (re-recording mixers); Benjamin Darier (adr mixer); Brett Voss (foley mixer) | Amazon |

=== 2020s ===
| Year | Program | Episode(s) | Nominees | Network |
|---|---|---|---|---|
| 2020 (28th) | The Marvelous Mrs. Maisel | "A Jewish Girl Walks Into the Apollo..." | Mathew Price (production mixer), Ron Bochar (re-recording mixer), Stewart Lerman (scoring mixer), David Boulton (adr mixer), George Lara (foley mixer) | Amazon |
| 2020 (28th) | Better Call Saul | "Bagman" | Phillip W. Palmer (production mixer); Larry B. Benjamin, Kevin Valentine (re-recording mixers); Chris Navarro (adr mixer); Stacey Michaels (foley mixer) | AMC |
| 2020 (28th) | The Crown | "Gold Stick" | Chris Ashworth (production mixer); Stuart Hilliker, Martin Jensen, Lee Walpole (re-recording mixers); Gibran Farrah (adr mixer); Catherine Thomas (foley mixer) | Netflix |
| 2020 (28th) | Ozark | "All In" | Felipe Borrero (production mixer); Larry B. Benjamin, Kevin Valentine (re-recording mixers); Phil McGowan (scoring mixer); Chris Navarro (adr mixer); Amy Barber (foley mixer) | Netflix |
| 2020 (28th) | Westworld | "The Mother of Exiles" | Geoffrey Patterson (production mixer); Benjamin L. Cook, Keith Rogers (re-recording mixers); Ramin Djawadi (scoring mixer) | HBO |
| 2021 (28th) | Yellowstone | "Half the Money" | Andrejs Prokopenko (production mixer); Samuel Ejnes, Diego Gat (re-recording mixers); Michael Miller, Chris Navarro (adr mixers) | Paramount Network |
| 2021 (28th) | The Morning Show | "My Least Favorite Year" | William B. Kaplan (production mixer); Jason Gaya, Elmo Ponsdomenech (re-recording mixers); Carter Burwell (scoring mixer); Brian Smith (adr mixer); James Howe (adr mixer) | Apple TV+ |
| 2021 (28th) | Squid Game | "VIPS" | Serge Perron, Park Hyeon-soo (re-recording mixers); Cameron Sloan (adr mixer) | Netflix |
| 2021 (28th) | Succession | "Secession" | Ken Ishii (production mixer); Andy Kris, Nicholas Renbeck (re-recording mixers); Tommy Vicari (scoring mixer); Mark DeSimone (adr mixer); Micah Blaichman (foley mixer) | HBO |
| 2021 (28th) | The White Lotus | "The Lotus-Eaters" | Walter Anderson (production mixer); Ryan Collins, Christian Minkler (re-recording mixers); Jeffrey Roy (adr mixer); Randy Wilson (foley mixer) | HBO |
| 2022 (30th) | Better Call Saul | "Saul Gone" | Phillip W. Palmer (production mixer); Larry Benjamin, Kevin Valentine (re-recording mixers); Chris Navarro (adr mixer); Stacey Michaels (foley mixer) | AMC |
| 2022 (30th) | Ozark | "A Hard Way to Go" | Akira Fukasawa (production mixer); Larry Benjamin, Kevin Valentine (re-recording mixers); Phil McGowan (scoring mixer); Amy Barber (foley mixer) | Netflix |
| 2022 (30th) | Stranger Things | "Chapter Seven: The Massacre at Hawkins Lab" | Michael P. Clark (production mixer); Mark Paterson, William Files, Craig Henighan (re-recording mixers); Hector Carlos Ramirez (scoring mixer); Jeffery Roy (adr mixer); Peter Persaud (foley mixer) | Netflix |
| 2022 (30th) | Severance | "The We We Are" | Bryan Dembinski (production mixer); Bob Chefalas (re-recording mixer); Chris Fogel (scoring mixer); George A. Lara (foley mixer) | Apple TV+ |
| 2022 (30th) | The White Lotus | "Ciao" | Angelo Bonanni (production mixer); Christian P. Minkler, Ryan Collins (re-recording mixers); Debra R. Winsberg (adr mixer); Michael Head (foley mixer) | HBO |
| 2023 (31st) | The Crown | "Gunpowder" | Chris Ashworth (production mixer); Stuart Hilliker, Lee Walpole, Martin Jensen (re-recording mixers); Ben Tisdall (adr mixer); Anna Wright (foley mixer) | Netflix |
| 2023 (31st) | The Last of Us | "When You're Lost in the Darkness" | Michael Playfair (production mixer); Marc Fishman, Kevin Roache (re-recording mixers); Randy Wilson (foley mixer) | HBO |
| 2023 (31st) | The Marvelous Mrs. Maisel | "The Testi-Roastial" | Mathew Price (production mixer), Ron Bochar (re-recording mixer), Stewart Lerman (scoring mixer), George A. Lara (foley mixer) | Prime Video |
| 2023 (31st) | Succession | "Connor's Wedding" | Ken Ishii (production mixer); Andy Kris, Nicholas Renbeck (re-recording mixers); Thomas Vicari (scoring mixer); Mark DeSimone (adr mixer); Micah Blaichman (foley mixer) | HBO |
| 2023 (31st) | Ted Lasso | "So Long, Farewell" | David Lascelles (production mixer); Ryan Kennedy, Sean Byrne (re-recording mixers); Jordan McClain (foley mixer) | Apple TV+ |
| Fallout | "The End" ~~ Tod A. Maitland (production sound mixer), Steve Bucino, Keith Rogers (re-recording mixers), Mike Marino (foley mixer) | Prime Video | | |
| Shōgun | "Broken to the Fist" | Michael Williamson (production sound mixer), Steve Pederson, Greg P. Russell (re-recording mixers), Takashi Akaku (adr mixer), Arno Stephanian (foley mixer) | FX | |
| Slow Horses | "Hello Goodbye" | Andrew Sissons (production sound mixer), Martin Jensen (re-recording mixer) | Apple TV+ | |
| True Detective: Night Country | "Part 6" | Skuli Helgi Sigurgislason (production sound mixer), Howard Bargoff, Mark Timms (re-recording mixers), Goetz Botzenhardt (scoring mixer), Nick Kray (adr mixer), Keith Partridge (foley mixer) | (HBO | |
| Yellowstone ~| "Life is a Promise" | Andrejs Prokopenko (production sound mixer), Brad Zoern, Josh Sieh, David S. DiPietro (re-recording mixers) | Paramount Network | | |

== Programs with multiple awards ==
6 awards

- Game of Thrones (HBO)

3 awards

- Deadwood (HBO)

2 awards

- 24 (Fox)
- Boardwalk Empire (HBO)
- NYPD Blue (ABC)
- The West Wing (NBC)

== Programs with multiple nominations ==
9 nominations

- 24 (Fox)

8 nominations

- Game of Thrones (HBO)
- NYPD Blue (ABC)

6 nominations

- Better Call Saul (AMC)
- CSI: Crime Scene Investigation (CBS)
- The Sopranos (HBO)

5 nominations

- Boardwalk Empire (HBO)
- ER (NBC)
- The X-Files (Fox)

4 nominations

- Homeland (Showtime)
- Stranger Things (Netflix)
- The Walking Dead (AMC)
- The West Wing (NBC)

3 nominations

- Alias (ABC)
- Breaking Bad (AMC)
- Chicago Hope (CBS)
- The Crown (Netflix)
- Deadwood (HBO)
- Dexter (Showtime)
- The Handmaid's Tale (Hulu)
- Lost (ABC)
- Mad Men (AMC)
- The Marvelous Mrs. Maisel (Amazon)
- Ozark (Netflix)
- Six Feet Under (HBO)
- Star Trek: Voyager (UPN)
- Ted Lasso (Apple TV+)
- Westworld (HBO)

2 nominations

- Glee (Fox)
- Law & Order (NBC)
- Lois & Clark: The New Adventures of Superman (ABC)
- Star Trek: The Next Generation (Syndicated)
- Succession (HBO)
- The White Lotus (HBO)

== See also ==
- Primetime Emmy Award for Outstanding Sound Mixing for a Comedy or Drama Series (One-Hour)
