= List of awards and nominations received by Lost =

Awards and nominations received by Lost
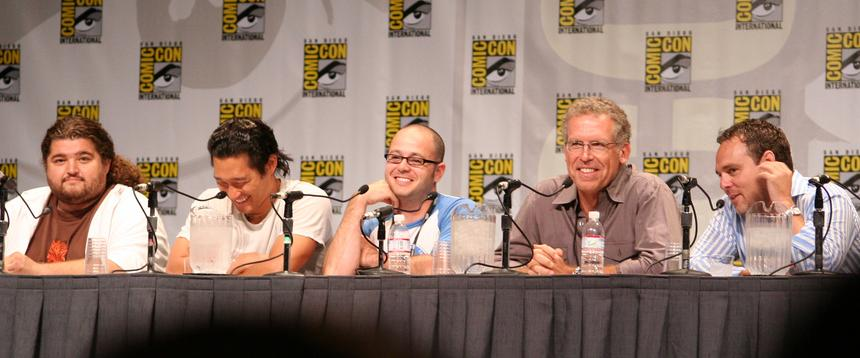
- From left to right: ALMA Award-winning actor Jorge Garcia, Daniel Dae Kim, and Primetime Emmy Award-winning executive producers Damon Lindelof, Carlton Cuse and Bryan Burk
Awards and nominations
Award	Wins	Nominations
ALMA Awards	3	7
American Cinema Editors Awards	1	5
American Film Institute Awards	3	—
American Society of Cinematographers Awards	0	1
Art Directors Guild Awards	0	3
Artios Awards	1	4
ASCAP Film and Television Music Awards	3	—
BAFTA TV Awards	0	2
BMI Film & TV Awards	1	—
Cinema Audio Society Awards	0	3
Directors Guild of America Awards	0	6
Family Television Awards	2	—
Golden Globe Awards	1	7
Golden Reel Awards	5	13
Hugo Awards	0	2
Imagen Awards	0	7
International Horror Guild Awards	1	1
JC Penney Asian Excellence Awards	0	1
NAACP Image Awards	1	2
National Television Awards	0	3
Peabody Award	1	—
People's Choice Awards	0	4
Primetime Emmy Awards	11	54
Prism Awards	1	4
Producers Guild of America Awards	1	6
Satellite Awards	1	8
Saturn Awards	13	54
Screen Actors Guild Awards	1	2
TCA Awards	4	17
Teen Choice Awards	0	33
Visual Effects Society Awards	2	4
Women's Image Network Awards	0	2
Writers Guild of America Awards	1	7
Young Artist Awards	1	6

Totals (Note: Certain award groups do not simply award one winner. They acknowledge several different recipients, have runners-up, and have third place. Since this is a specific recognition and is different from losing an award, runner-up mentions are considered wins in this award tally. For simplification and to avoid errors, each award in this list has been presumed to have had a prior nomination.)
- Wins: 59
- Nominations: 268

Lost is an American drama series that aired on ABC from September 22, 2004, until May 23, 2010. It was nominated for numerous awards, including 54 Primetime Emmy Awards (11 wins), 54 Saturn Awards (13 wins), 33 Teen Choice Awards, 17 TCA Awards (4 wins), 13 Golden Reel Awards (5 wins), 8 Satellite Awards (1 win), 7 Golden Globe Awards (1 win), 7 Writers Guild of America Awards (1 win), 6 Directors Guild of America Awards, 6 Producers Guild of America Awards (1 win), 4 People's Choice Awards, 2 BAFTA TV Awards, 2 NAACP Image Awards (1 win), and 2 Screen Actors Guild Awards (1 win). Amongst the wins for the series are the Primetime Emmy Award for Outstanding Drama Series (1 win), Golden Globe Award for Best Television Series – Drama (1 win), Screen Actors Guild Award for Outstanding Performance by an Ensemble in a Drama Series (1 win), Saturn Award for Best Network Television Series (5 wins), TCA Award for Outstanding Achievement in Drama (3 wins), and Peabody Award (1 win).

The series has an ensemble cast and several different Lost actors have received acting award nominations. Michael Emerson and Terry O'Quinn are the only actors to win Primetime Emmy Awards. Matthew Fox has been nominated for 19 individual awards (winning three), the most of any cast member; Evangeline Lilly is second with 16 and Emerson is third with 13 (winning two). "Pilot" is the most nominated episode of the series, receiving nominations from fifteen different associations; the episode won eight awards, including four Primetime Emmy Awards. The third-season finale, "Through the Looking Glass", is the second most nominated episode with nine while "The End" received the most Primetime Emmy Award nominations with eight, winning one.

== Emmy Awards ==
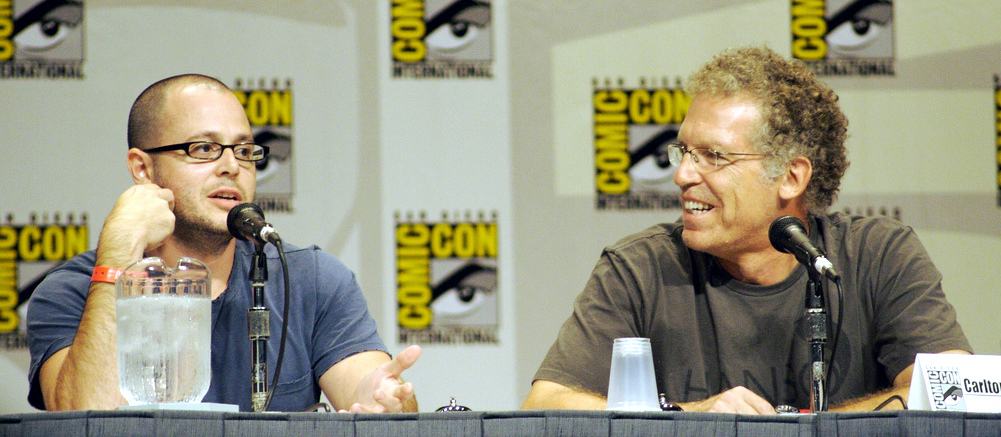
From left to right: Executive producers Damon Lindelof and Carlton Cuse were both nominated together four times for Outstanding Writing for a Drama Series in 2006, 2007, 2009, and 2010

In 2005, Lost was nominated for twelve Primetime Emmy Awards and won six, including Outstanding Drama Series, which was considered an unusual win since the Primetime Emmy Awards had rarely recognized science fiction or fantasy programs. It also won Outstanding Directing for a Drama Series for co-creator J. J. Abrams (for his direction on the pilot episode), Outstanding Casting for a Drama Series, and three additional awards for the pilot episode. The following year, the series was nominated for nine awards, but failed to win any. Despite winning for Outstanding Drama Series the previous year, Lost was not nominated in 2006. This was referenced in host Conan O'Brien's opening segment at the 58th Primetime Emmy Awards; he lands on a beach and encounters Jorge Garcia. O'Brien jumps into a hatch and invites Garcia to come along to the ceremony, but Garcia tells him that they "weren't exactly invited", to which O'Brien responds by saying "Really? But you won last year! Nothing makes sense anymore!" In 2007, the series was nominated for six awards, but again failed to gain a nomination for Outstanding Drama Series. Additionally, Terry O'Quinn became the first Lost actor to win a Primetime Emmy Award, picking up the award for Outstanding Supporting Actor in a Drama Series for his performance as John Locke in "The Man from Tallahassee" (season 3, episode 13). In 2008, the series received eight nominations, including Outstanding Drama Series after being snubbed the two previous years; the season only won Outstanding Sound Mixing for a Comedy or Drama Series (One-Hour) for "Meet Kevin Johnson" (season 4, episode 8). In 2009, the series received six nominations and won two; Michael Emerson became the second actor from Lost to win a Primetime Emmy Award, winning for Outstanding Supporting Actor in a Drama Series for his performance as Ben Linus in "Dead Is Dead" (season 5, episode 12). The website DharmaWantsYou.com won a special award for Outstanding Creative Achievement in Interactive Media – Fiction. In 2010, the sixth and final season of Lost received thirteen nominations, including a fourth and final nomination for Outstanding Drama Series, which it lost to season 3 of Mad Men, as in the two previous years. The season only won Outstanding Single-Camera Picture Editing for a Drama Series for the finale.

=== Primetime Emmy Awards ===
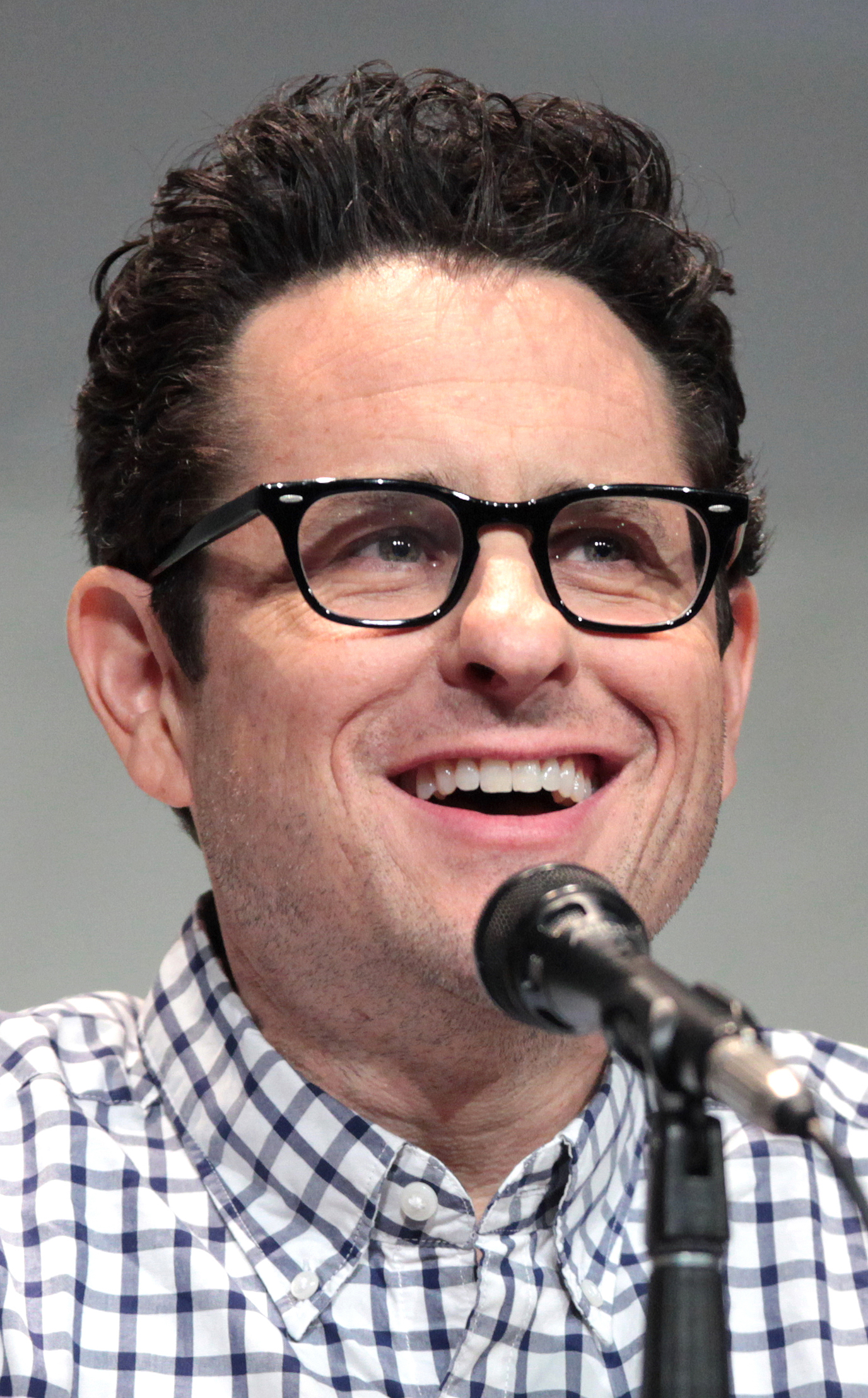
Co-creator and executive producer J. J. Abrams won Outstanding Directing for a Drama Series for directing the pilot episode in 2005

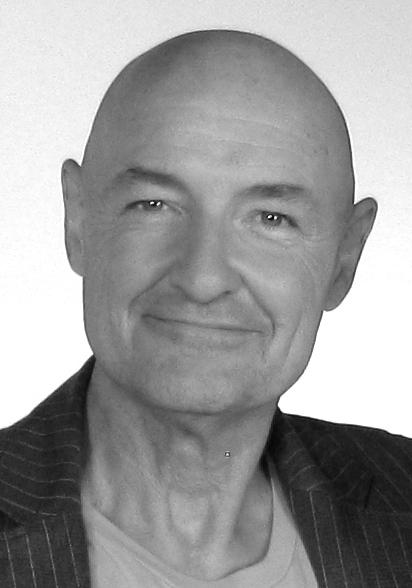
Terry O'Quinn won Outstanding Supporting Actor in a Drama Series for his performance as John Locke in 2007

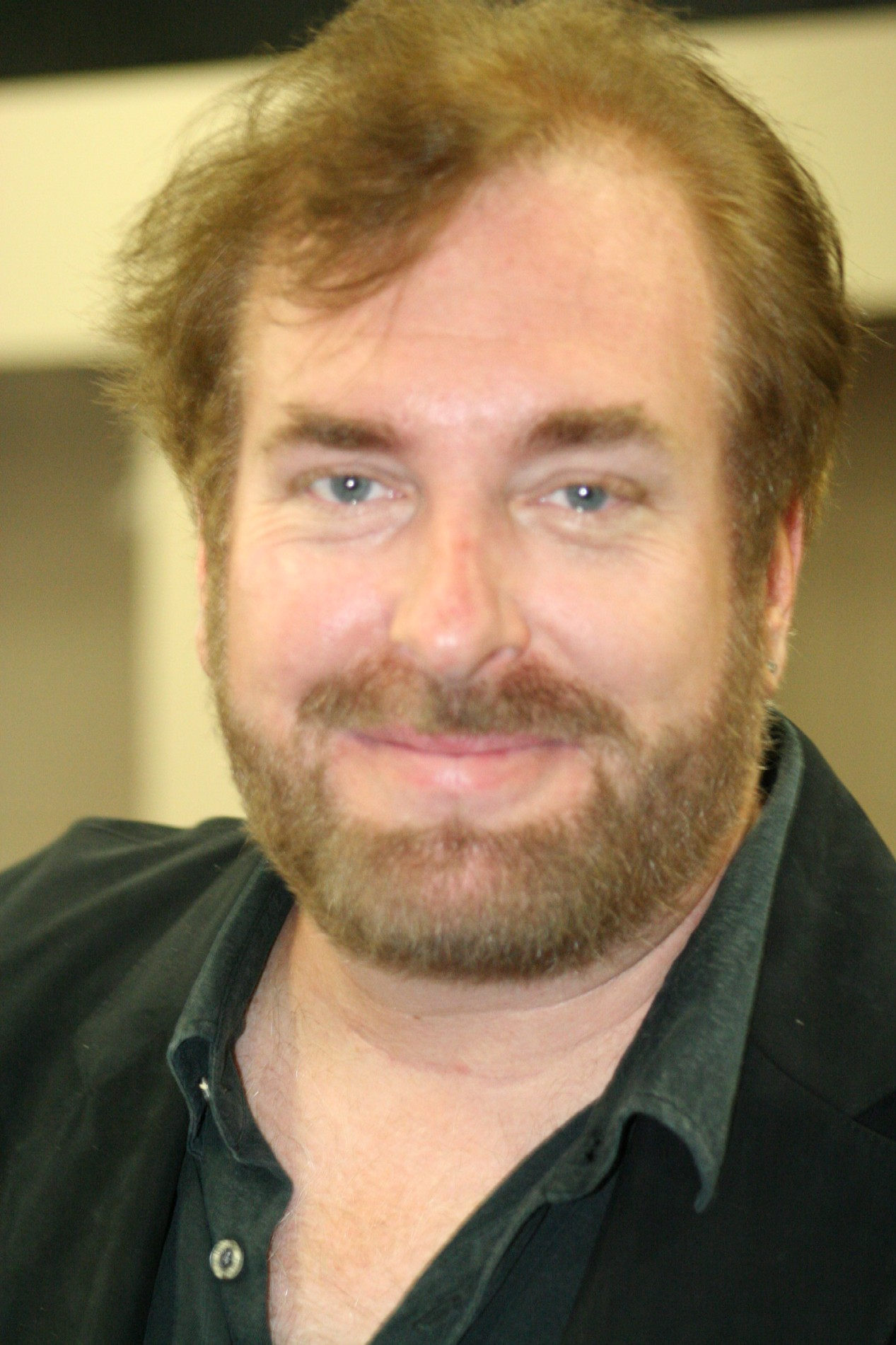
David Fury was nominated for Outstanding Writing for a Drama Series for "Walkabout" in 2005

Year	Category	Nominee(s)	Episode(s)	Result
2005	Outstanding Drama Series	J. J. Abrams, Jesse Alexander, Jack Bender, Bryan Burk, Sarah Caplan, Carlton Cuse, Leonard Dick, David Fury, Javier Grillo-Marxuach, Jean Higgins, and Damon Lindelof		Won
2005	Outstanding Directing for a Drama Series	J. J. Abrams	"Pilot"	Won
2005	Outstanding Supporting Actor in a Drama Series	Naveen Andrews as Sayid Jarrah	"Solitary" + "The Greater Good"	Nominated
2005	Outstanding Supporting Actor in a Drama Series	Terry O'Quinn as John Locke	"Walkabout" + "The Moth"	Nominated
2005	Outstanding Writing for a Drama Series	J. J. Abrams, Damon Lindelof, and Jeffrey Lieber	"Pilot"	Nominated
2005	Outstanding Writing for a Drama Series	David Fury	"Walkabout"	Nominated
2006	Outstanding Directing for a Drama Series	Jack Bender	"Live Together, Die Alone"	Nominated
2006	Outstanding Writing for a Drama Series	Damon Lindelof and Carlton Cuse	"The 23rd Psalm"	Nominated
2007	Outstanding Directing for a Drama Series	Jack Bender	"Through the Looking Glass"	Nominated
2007	Outstanding Supporting Actor in a Drama Series	Michael Emerson as Ben Linus	"The Man Behind the Curtain"	Nominated
2007	Outstanding Supporting Actor in a Drama Series	Terry O'Quinn as John Locke	"The Man from Tallahassee"	Won
2007	Outstanding Writing for a Drama Series	Damon Lindelof and Carlton Cuse	"Through the Looking Glass"	Nominated
2008	Outstanding Drama Series	J. J. Abrams, Jack Bender, Bryan Burk, Pat Churchill, Carlton Cuse, Ra'uf Glasgow, Drew Goddard, Jean Higgins, Adam Horowitz, Edward Kitsis, Damon Lindelof, Elizabeth Sarnoff, and Stephen Williams		Nominated
2008	Outstanding Supporting Actor in a Drama Series	Michael Emerson as Ben Linus	"The Shape of Things to Come"	Nominated
2009	Outstanding Drama Series	J. J. Abrams, Jack Bender, Bryan Burk, Pat Churchill, Carlton Cuse, Ra'uf Glasgow, Jean Higgins, Adam Horowitz, Edward Kitsis, Damon Lindelof, Elizabeth Sarnoff, Brian K. Vaughan, Stephen Williams, and Paul Zbyszewski		Nominated
2009	Outstanding Supporting Actor in a Drama Series	Michael Emerson as Ben Linus	"Dead Is Dead"	Won
2009	Outstanding Writing for a Drama Series	Damon Lindelof and Carlton Cuse	"The Incident"	Nominated
2010	Outstanding Drama Series	J. J. Abrams, Jack Bender, Bryan Burk, Carlton Cuse, Ra'uf Glasgow, Jean Higgins, Adam Horowitz, Melinda Hsu Taylor, Edward Kitsis, Damon Lindelof, Elizabeth Sarnoff, and Paul Zbyszewski		Nominated
2010	Outstanding Directing for a Drama Series	Jack Bender	"The End"	Nominated
2010	Outstanding Lead Actor in a Drama Series	Matthew Fox as Jack Shephard	"The End"	Nominated
2010	Outstanding Supporting Actor in a Drama Series	Michael Emerson as Ben Linus	"Dr. Linus"	Nominated
2010	Outstanding Supporting Actor in a Drama Series	Terry O'Quinn as John Locke / The Man in Black	"The Substitute"	Nominated
2010	Outstanding Writing for a Drama Series	Damon Lindelof and Carlton Cuse	"The End"	Nominated
2010	Outstanding Guest Actress in a Drama Series	Elizabeth Mitchell as Juliet Burke	"The End"	Nominated

=== Creative Arts Emmy Awards ===
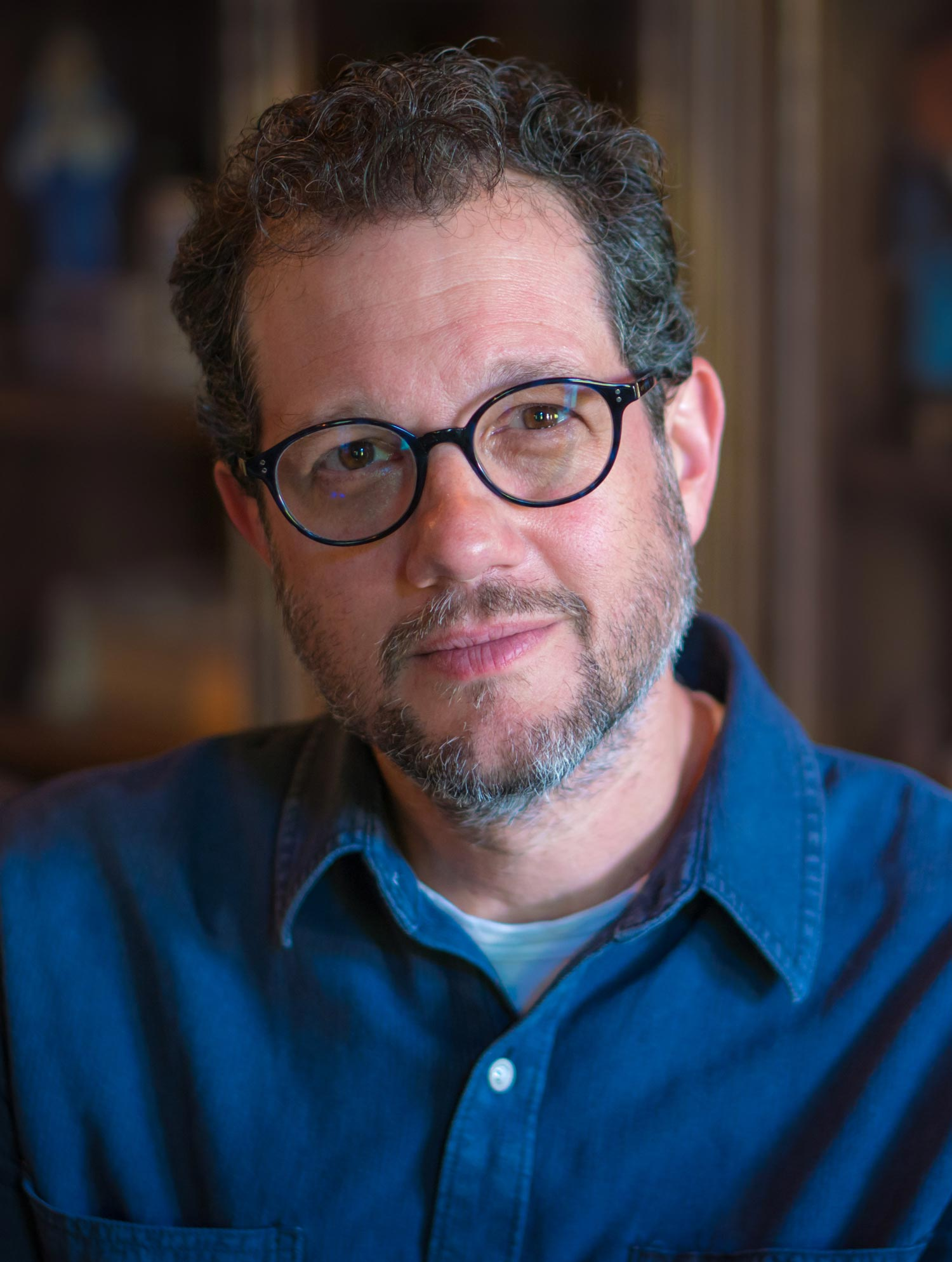
Michael Giacchino was nominated thrice for Outstanding Music Composition for a Series (Dramatic Underscore), winning once in 2005

Year	Category	Nominee(s)	Episode(s)	Result
2005	Outstanding Casting for a Drama Series	Veronica Collins Rooney, Mandy Sherman, April Webster, and Alyssa Weisberg		Won
2005	Outstanding Music Composition for a Series (Dramatic Underscore)	Michael Giacchino	"Pilot"	Won
2005	Outstanding Single-Camera Picture Editing for a Drama Series	Mary Jo Markey	"Pilot"	Won
2005	Outstanding Sound Editing for a Series	Troy Allen, Patrick Cabral, Stephen M. Davis, Thomas DeGorter, Marc Glassman, Trevor Jolly, Maciek Malish, Paul Menichini, Cynthia Merrill, Chris Reeves, Gabrielle Reeves, and Roland Thai	"Pilot"	Nominated
2005	Outstanding Single-Camera Sound Mixing for a Series	Michael C. Moore, Frank Morrone, and Scott Weber	"Outlaws"	Nominated
2005	Outstanding Special Visual Effects for a Series	Laurent M. Abecassis, Archie Ahuna, Kevin Blank, Steve Fong, Benoit Girard, Kevin Kutchaver, Jonathan Spencer Levy, Bob Lloyd, and Mitch Suskin	"Pilot"	Won
2006	Outstanding Casting for a Drama Series	Veronica Collins Rooney, Mandy Sherman, and April Webster		Nominated
2006	Outstanding Cinematography for a Single-Camera Series	Michael Bonvillain	"Man of Science, Man of Faith"	Nominated
2006	Outstanding Guest Actor in a Drama Series	Henry Ian Cusick as Desmond Hume	"Live Together, Die Alone"	Nominated
2006	Outstanding Single-Camera Picture Editing for a Drama Series	Sarah Boyd	"One of Them"	Nominated
2006	Outstanding Single-Camera Picture Editing for a Drama Series	Sue Blainey, Sarah Boyd, and Stephen Semel	"Live Together, Die Alone"	Nominated
2006	Outstanding Single-Camera Sound Mixing for a Series	Frank Morrone, Sean Rush, Scott Weber, and David Yaffe	"Live Together, Die Alone"	Nominated
2006	Outstanding Special Visual Effects for a Series	Archie Ahuna, Kevin Blank, Scott Dewis, Steve Fong, Kevin Kutchaver, Jonathan Spencer Levy, Bob Lloyd, Mitch Suskin, and Jay Worth	"Live Together, Die Alone"	Nominated
2007	Outstanding Single-Camera Picture Editing for a Drama Series	Mark J. Goldman, Christopher Nelson, Stephen Semel, and Henk Van Eeghen	"Through the Looking Glass"	Nominated
2007	Outstanding Sound Editing for a Series	Thomas DeGorter, Paula Fairfield, Jay Keiser, Alex Levy, Maciek Malish, Cynthia Merrill, Carla Murray, Doug Reed, Joe Schultz, and Geordy Sincavage	"A Tale of Two Cities"	Nominated
2008	Outstanding Cinematography for a Single-Camera Series (One-Hour)	John S. Bartley	"The Constant"	Nominated
2008	Outstanding Music Composition for a Series (Original Dramatic Score)	Michael Giacchino	"The Constant"	Nominated
2008	Outstanding Single-Camera Picture Editing for a Drama Series	Robert Florio, Mark J. Goldman, Stephen Semel, and Henk Van Eeghen	"There's No Place Like Home", Parts 2 & 3	Nominated
2008	Outstanding Sound Editing for a Series	Jim Bailey, Thomas DeGorter, Paula Fairfield, Jay Keiser, Alex Levy, Maciek Malish, Cynthia Merril, Carla Murray, and Joseph Schultz	"The Shape of Things to Come"	Nominated
2008	Outstanding Sound Mixing for a Comedy or Drama Series (One-Hour)	Robert J. Anderson Jr., Frank Morrone, and Scott Weber	"Meet Kevin Johnson"	Won
2008	Outstanding Special Class – Short-Format Live-Action Entertainment Program	Damon Lindelof, Carlton Cuse, and Barry Jossen	Lost: Missing Pieces	Nominated
2009	Outstanding Creative Achievement in Interactive Media – Fiction	The Dharma Initiative • DharmaWantsYou.com		Won
2009	Outstanding Single-Camera Picture Editing for a Drama Series	Mark J. Goldman, Christopher Nelson, and Stephen Semel	"The Incident"	Nominated
2009	Outstanding Sound Mixing for a Comedy or Drama Series (One-Hour)	Robert J. Anderson Jr., Ken King, Frank Morrone, and Scott Weber	"The Incident"	Nominated
2010	Outstanding Art Direction for a Single-Camera Series	Zack Grobler, Matthew C. Jacobs, and Carol Bayne Kelley	"Ab Aeterno"	Nominated
2010	Outstanding Guest Actress in a Drama Series	Elizabeth Mitchell as Juliet Burke	"The End"	Nominated
2010	Outstanding Music Composition for a Series (Original Dramatic Score)	Michael Giacchino	"The End"	Nominated
2010	Outstanding Single-Camera Picture Editing for a Drama Series	Mark J. Goldman, Christopher Nelson, Stephen Semel, and Henk Van Eeghen	"The End"	Won
2010	Outstanding Sound Editing for a Series	Mark Allen, James Bailey, Adam DeCoster, Thomas DeGorter, Paula Fairfield, Jay Keiser, Robert Kellough, Alex Levy, Maciek Malish, Carla Murray, Chris Reeves, Gabrielle Reeves, Joe Schultz, and Geordy Sincavage	"The End"	Nominated
2010	Outstanding Sound Mixing for a Comedy or Drama Series (One-Hour)	Robert J. Anderson Jr., Ken King, Frank Morrone, and Scott Weber	"The End"	Nominated
2010	Outstanding Special Class Program	Ted Bramble, Agnes Chu, Greg Nations, and Christopher J. Powers	Mysteries of the Universe – The Dharma Initiative	Nominated

== Directors Guild of America Awards ==
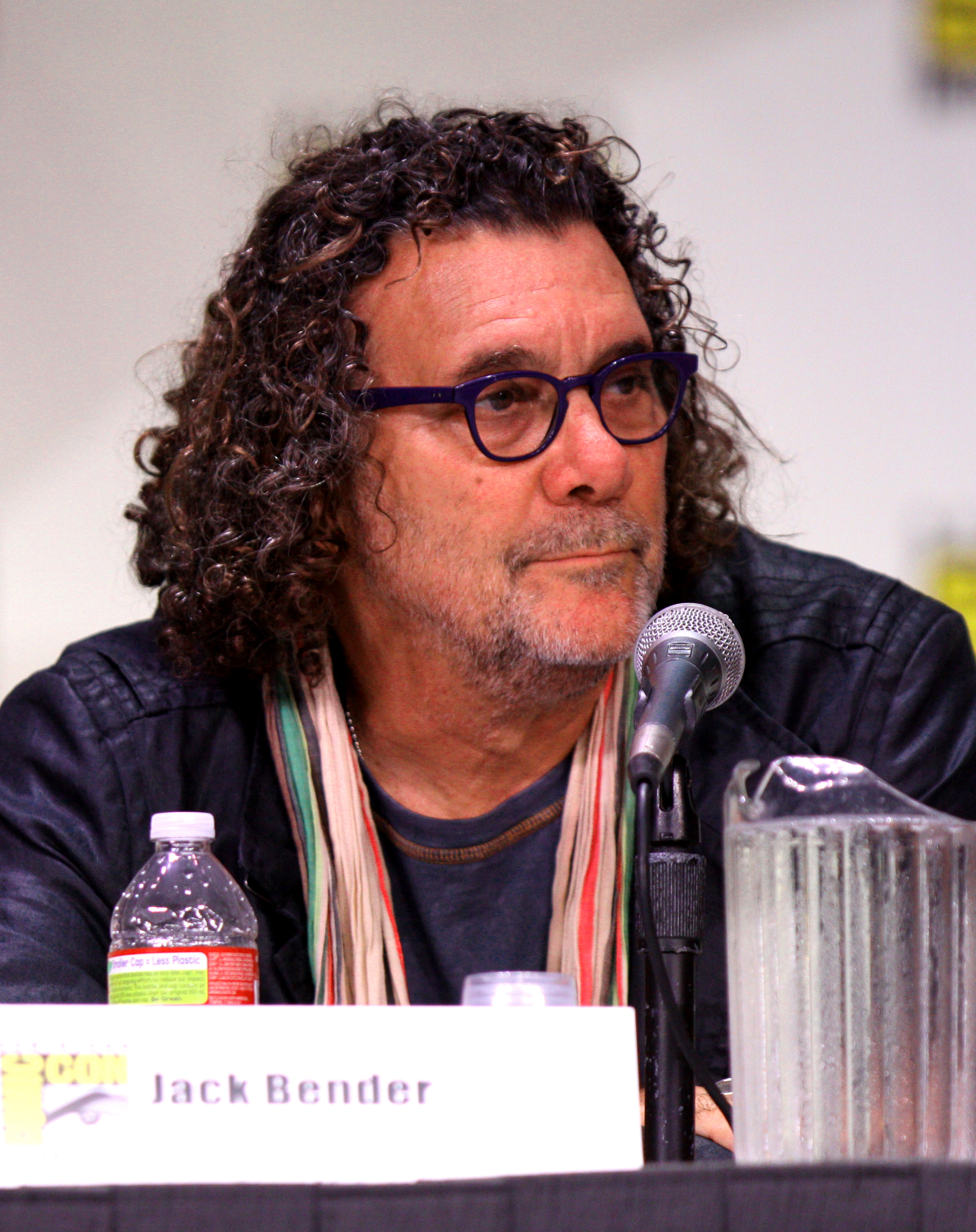
Executive producer and lead director Jack Bender has been nominated four times, including one for his direction on "The End"

The Directors Guild of America Awards are issued annually by the Directors Guild of America. Lost has been nominated six times for Outstanding Directorial Achievement in Dramatic Series, but failed to win any.

Year	Category	Nominee	Episode	Result
2005	Outstanding Directorial Achievement in Dramatic Series	J. J. Abrams	"Pilot"	Nominated
2008	Outstanding Directorial Achievement in Dramatic Series	Eric Laneuville	"The Brig"	Nominated
2008	Outstanding Directorial Achievement in Dramatic Series	Jack Bender	"Through the Looking Glass"	Nominated
2009	Outstanding Directorial Achievement in Dramatic Series	Jack Bender	"The Constant"	Nominated
2010	Outstanding Directorial Achievement in Dramatic Series	Jack Bender	"The Incident"	Nominated
2011	Outstanding Directorial Achievement in Dramatic Series	Jack Bender	"The End"	Nominated

== Golden Globe Awards ==
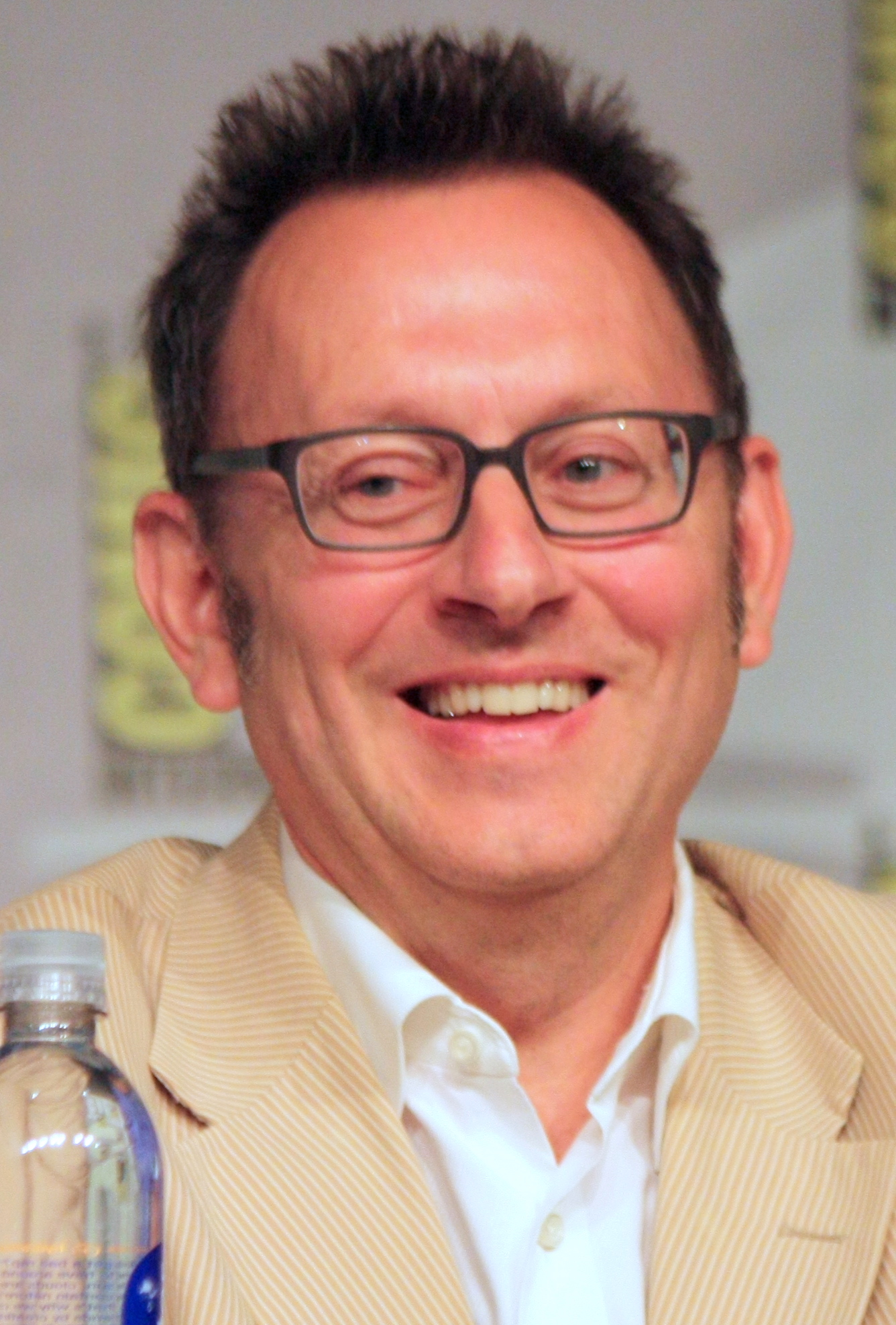
Michael Emerson was nominated for Best Actor in a Supporting Role in a Series, Miniseries, or Motion Picture Made for Television in 2010

Lost was nominated for Best Television Series – Drama at the Hollywood Foreign Press Association's annual Golden Globe Awards three straight years in 2005, 2006 and 2007, winning in 2006. Naveen Andrews, Michael Emerson, Matthew Fox, and Evangeline Lilly have all received nominations for acting.

Year	Category	Nominee	Result
2005	Best Television Series – Drama		Nominated
2006	Best Television Series – Drama		Won
2006	Best Actor in a Television Series – Drama	Matthew Fox	Nominated
2006	Best Actor in a Supporting Role in a Series, Miniseries, or Motion Picture Made for Television	Naveen Andrews	Nominated
2007	Best Television Series – Drama		Nominated
2007	Best Actress in a Television Series – Drama	Evangeline Lilly	Nominated
2010	Best Actor in a Supporting Role in a Series, Miniseries, or Motion Picture Made for Television	Michael Emerson	Nominated

== Golden Reel Awards ==
The Golden Reel Awards are presented annually by the Motion Picture Sound Editors. Lost has been nominated in various categories thirteen times, winning five.

Year	Category	Nominee(s)	Episode	Result
2005	Best Sound Editing in Television Short Form – Dialogue & ADR	Thomas DeGorter, Trevor Jolly, Christopher B. Reeves, Gabrielle Gilbert Reeves, and Troy Allen	"Pilot", Part 1	Won
2005	Best Sound Editing in Television Short Form – Sound Effects & Foley	Thomas DeGorter, Trevor Jolly, Paul Menichini, Roland N. Thai, and Marc Glassman	"Pilot", Part 1	Won
2006	Best Sound Editing in Television Short Form – Dialogue and Automated Dialogue Replacement	Thomas DeGorter, Trevor Jolly, Maciek Malish, and Jay Keiser	"The Other 48 Days"	Nominated
2007	Best Sound Editing in Sound Effects and Foley for Television – Short Form	Thomas DeGorter, Paula Fairfield, Carla Murray, Cynthia Merrill, and Doug Reed	"A Tale of Two Cities"	Won
2007	Best Sound Editing in Television: Short Form – Dialogue and Automated Dialogue Replacement	Thomas DeGorter, Jay Keiser, and Maciek Malish	"Further Instructions"	Nominated
2008	Best Sound Editing – Dialogue and ADR for Long Form Television	Thomas DeGorter, Maciek Malish, Jay Keiser, Christopher B. Reeves, Gabrielle Gilbert Reeves, Thomas A. Harris, and Scott Weber	"Through the Looking Glass"	Nominated
2008	Best Sound Editing – Sound Effects and Foley for Long Form Television	Thomas DeGorter, Paula Fairfield, Carla Murray, Joseph Schultz, Geordy Sincavage, Scott Weber, Cynthia Merrill, and Doug Reed	"Through the Looking Glass"	Nominated
2008	Best Sound Editing – Dialogue and ADR for Short Form Television	Thomas DeGorter, Maciek Malish, Jay Keiser, and Scott Weber	"Greatest Hits"	Nominated
2008	Best Sound Editing – Sound Effects and Foley for Short Form Television	Thomas DeGorter, Paula Fairfield, Carla Murray, Joseph Schultz, Geordy Sincavage, Scott Weber, Cynthia Merrill, and Doug Reed	"Left Behind"	Won
2009	Best Sound Editing – Short Form Dialogue and ADR in Television	Thomas DeGorter, Maciek Malish, and Jay Keiser	"Confirmed Dead"	Won
2009	Best Sound Editing – Short Form Sound Effects and Foley in Television	Thomas DeGorter, Paula Fairfield, Carla Murray, Joseph Schultz, Geordy Sincavage, Cynthia Merrill, and James Bailey	"The Shape of Things to Come"	Nominated
2010	Best Sound Editing – Short Form Dialogue and ADR in Television	Thomas DeGorter, Maciek Malish, and Jay Keiser	"The Little Prince"	Nominated
2011	Best Sound Editing – Short Form Sound Effects and Foley in Television	Thomas DeGorter, Paula Fairfield, Carla Murray, James Bailey, Adam DeCoster, Joseph Schultz, and Geordy Sincavage	"Ab Aeterno"	Nominated

== Satellite Awards ==
The Satellite Awards, originally known as the Golden Satellite Awards, are annually given by the International Press Academy, which is commonly noted in entertainment industry journals and blogs. Lost has won one award, which went to Matthew Fox for Best Actor in a Series – Drama in 2005.

Year	Category	Nominee	Result
2005 (1)	Best Television Series – Drama		Nominated
2005 (1)	Best Actor in a Series – Drama	Matthew Fox	Won
2005 (1)	Best Actress in a Series – Drama	Evangeline Lilly	Nominated
2005 (2)	Best Television Series – Drama		Nominated
2005 (2)	Best DVD Release of a TV Show	Lost – The Complete First Season	Nominated
2006	Best Actor in a Supporting Role in a Series, Mini-Series, or Motion Picture Made for Television	Michael Emerson	Nominated
2007	Best Actor in a Supporting Role in a Series, Mini-Series, or Motion Picture Made for Television	Michael Emerson	Nominated
2007	Best DVD Release of a TV Show	Lost – The Complete Third Season	Nominated

== Saturn Awards ==
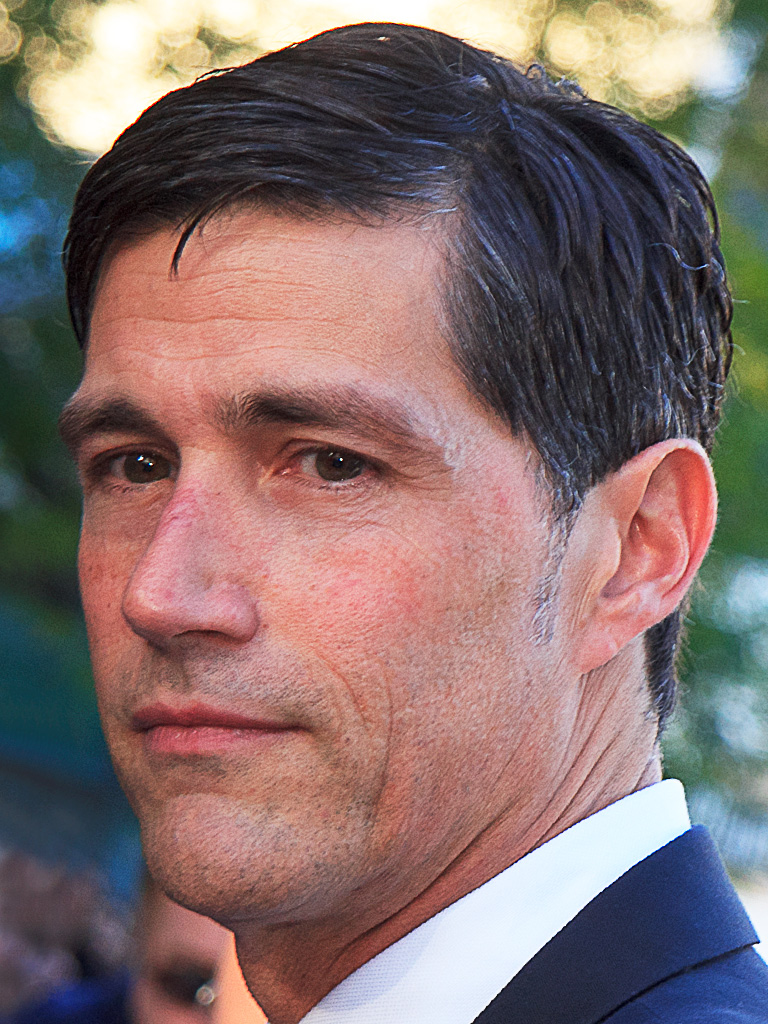
Matthew Fox has been nominated seven times for Best Actor on Television, winning twice (2006, 2008)

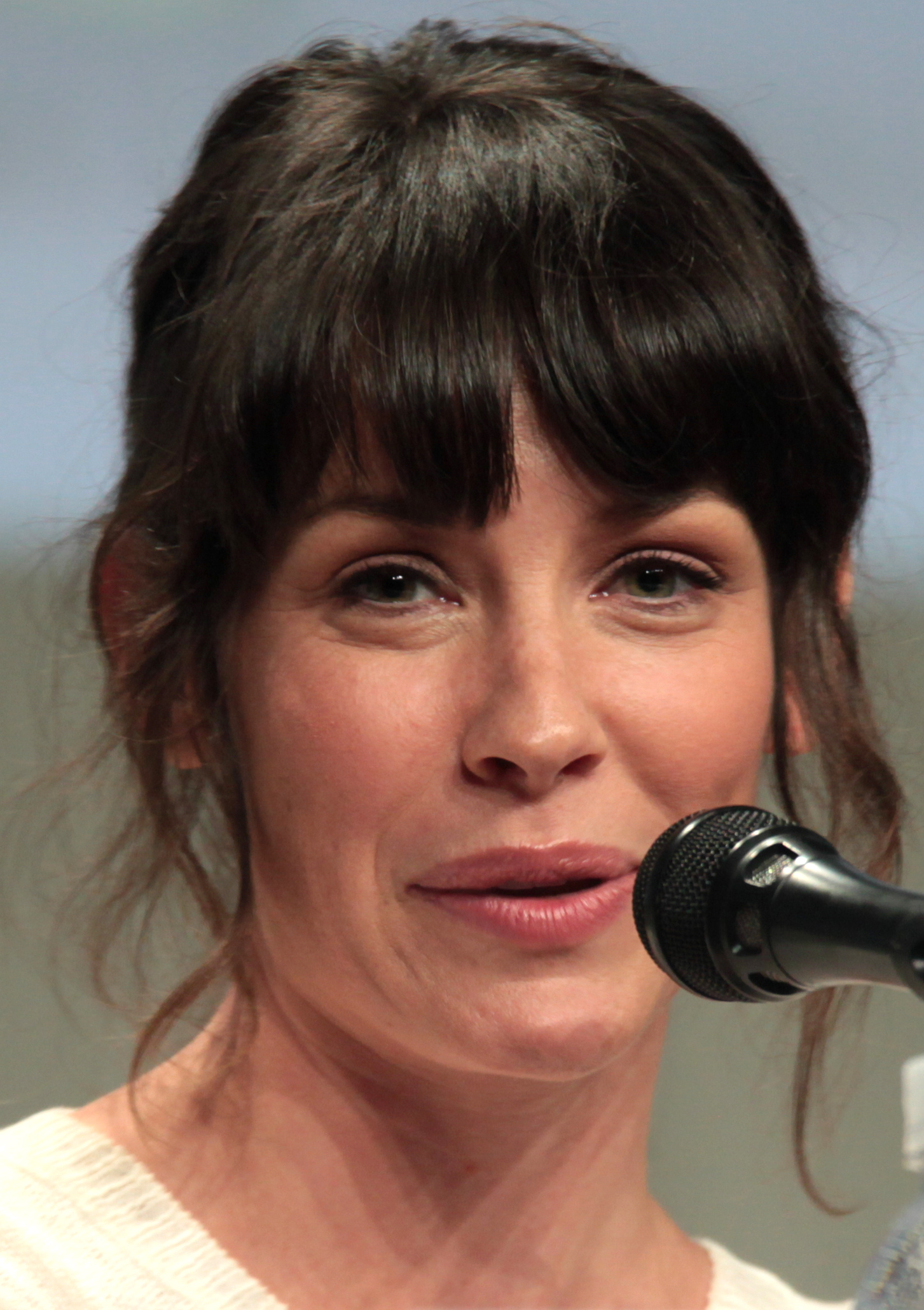
Evangeline Lilly has been nominated six times for Best Actress on Television (2005–2010)

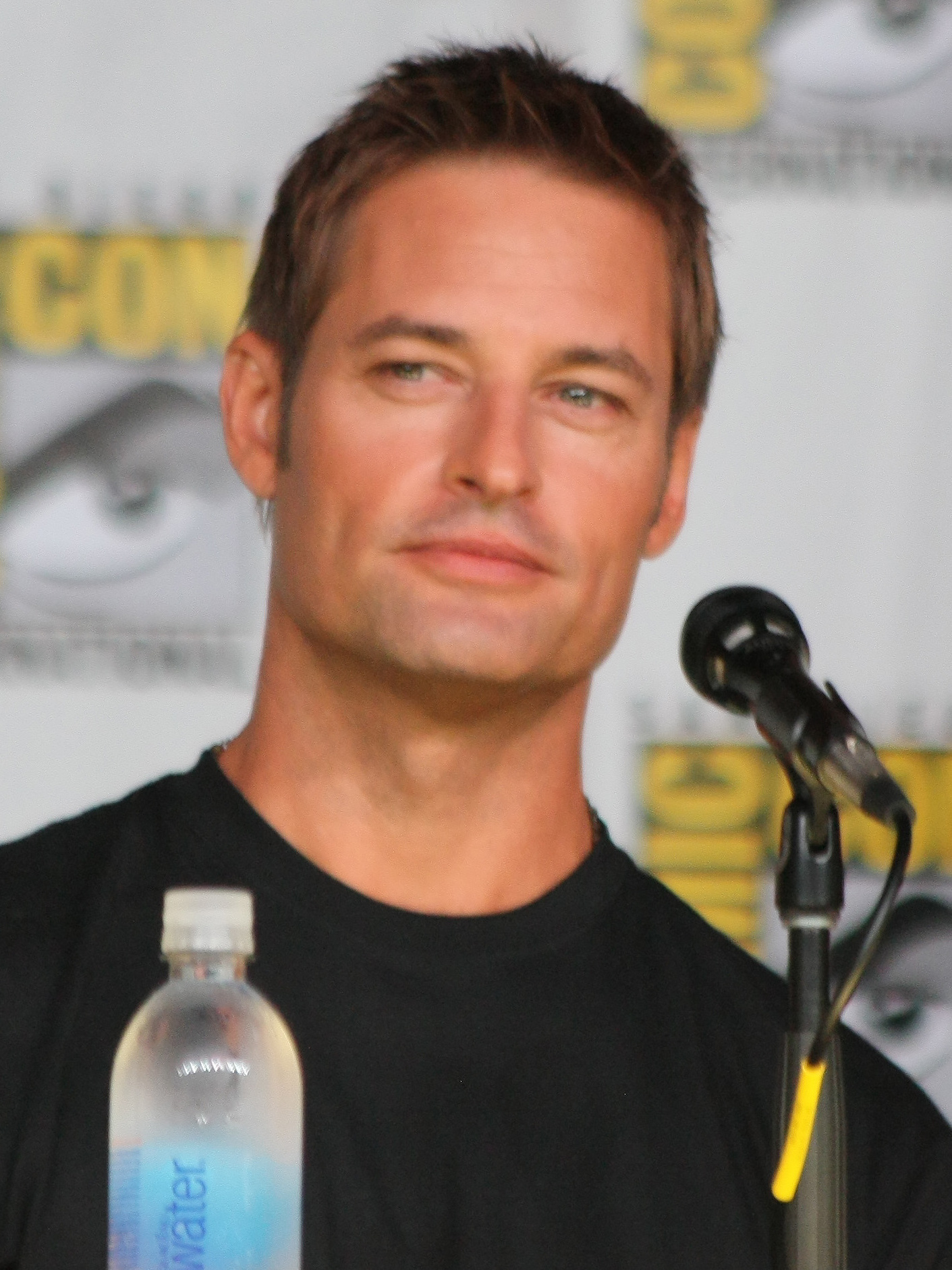
Josh Holloway has been nominated four times, winning only once for Best Actor on Television (2010)

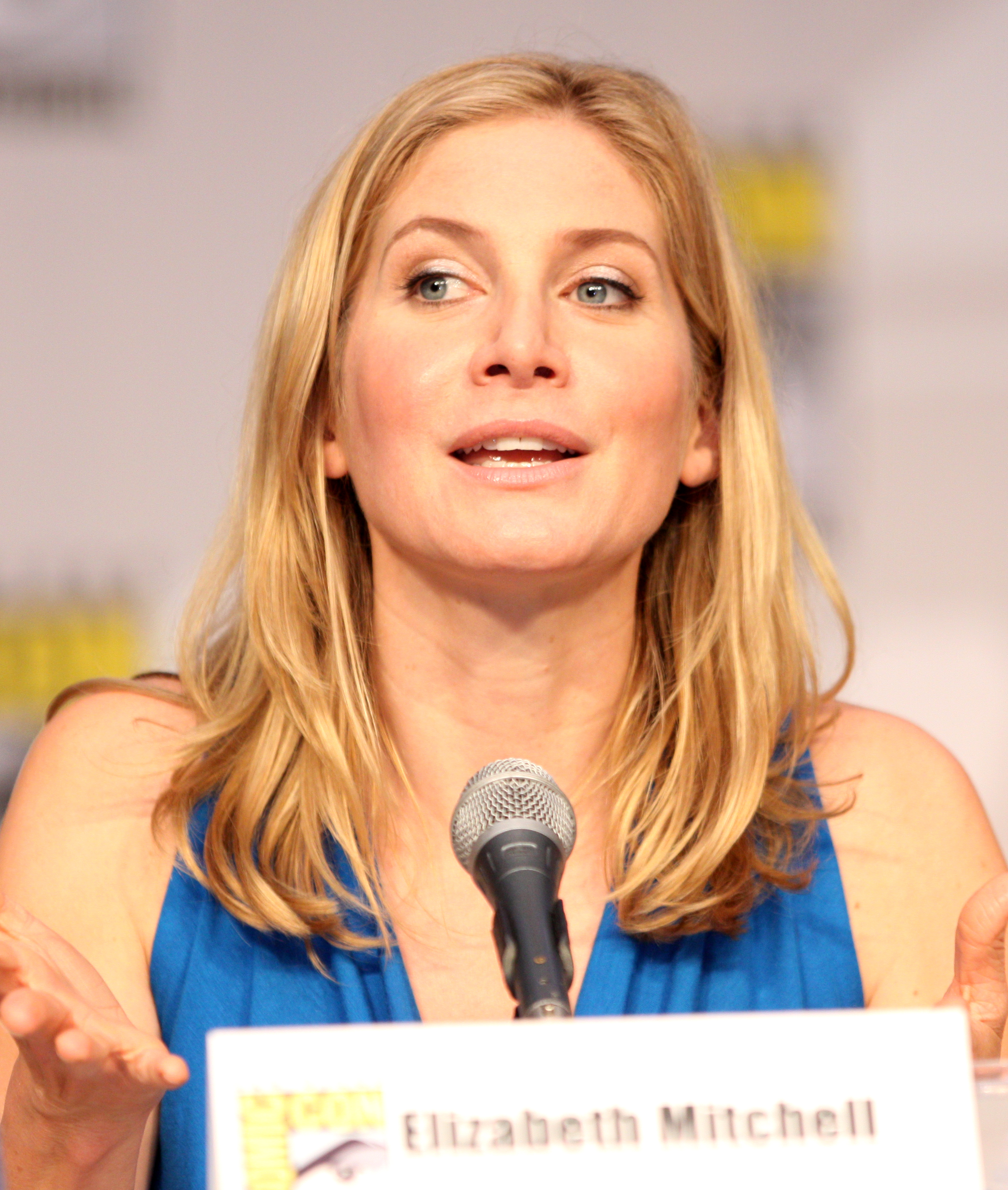
Elizabeth Mitchell has been nominated four times, winning only once for Best Supporting Actress on Television (2008)

The Saturn Awards are presented annually by the Academy of Science Fiction, Fantasy and Horror Films, which honors science fiction, fantasy and horror in film, television, and home video. Lost has been nominated for 54 awards and has won 13, including five wins for Best Network Television Series (2005–2006, 2008–2010) and acting wins for Michael Emerson (2008), Matthew Fox (2006, 2008), Josh Holloway (2010), Elizabeth Mitchell (2008), and Terry O'Quinn (2005).

Year	Category	Nominee	Result
2005	Best Network Television Series		Won
2005	Best Actor on Television	Matthew Fox	Nominated
2005	Best Actress on Television	Evangeline Lilly	Nominated
2005	Best Supporting Actor on Television	Dominic Monaghan	Nominated
2005	Best Supporting Actor on Television	Terry O'Quinn	Won
2006	Best Network Television Series		Won
2006	Best Actor on Television	Matthew Fox	Won
2006	Best Actress on Television	Evangeline Lilly	Nominated
2006	Best Supporting Actor on Television	Adewale Akinnuoye-Agbaje	Nominated
2006	Best Supporting Actor on Television	Terry O'Quinn	Nominated
2006	Best Supporting Actress on Television	Michelle Rodriguez	Nominated
2006	Best DVD Television Release	Lost – The Complete First Season	Won
2007	Best Network Television Series		Nominated
2007	Best Actor on Television	Matthew Fox	Nominated
2007	Best Actress on Television	Evangeline Lilly	Nominated
2007	Best Supporting Actor on Television	Michael Emerson	Nominated
2007	Best Supporting Actor on Television	Josh Holloway	Nominated
2007	Best Supporting Actress on Television	Elizabeth Mitchell	Nominated
2007	Best DVD Television Release	Lost – The Complete Second Season	Nominated
2008	Best Network Television Series		Won
2008	Best Actor on Television	Matthew Fox	Won
2008	Best Actress on Television	Evangeline Lilly	Nominated
2008	Best Supporting Actor on Television	Michael Emerson	Won
2008	Best Supporting Actor on Television	Josh Holloway	Nominated
2008	Best Supporting Actor on Television	Terry O'Quinn	Nominated
2008	Best Supporting Actress on Television	Elizabeth Mitchell	Won (Note: Tied with Summer Glau for Terminator: The Sarah Connor Chronicles)
2008	Best DVD Television Release	Lost – The Complete Third Season	Nominated
2009	Best Network Television Series		Won
2009	Best Actor on Television	Matthew Fox	Nominated
2009	Best Actress on Television	Evangeline Lilly	Nominated
2009	Best Supporting Actor on Television	Henry Ian Cusick	Nominated
2009	Best Supporting Actor on Television	Michael Emerson	Nominated
2009	Best Supporting Actor on Television	Josh Holloway	Nominated
2009	Best Supporting Actress on Television	Yunjin Kim	Nominated
2009	Best Supporting Actress on Television	Elizabeth Mitchell	Nominated
2009	Best Guest Starring Role on Television	Alan Dale	Nominated
2009	Best Guest Starring Role on Television	Kevin Durand	Nominated
2009	Best Guest Starring Role on Television	Sonya Walger	Nominated
2009	Best DVD Television Release	Lost – The Complete Fourth Season	Nominated
2010	Best Network Television Series		Won
2010	Best Actor on Television	Matthew Fox	Nominated
2010	Best Actor on Television	Josh Holloway	Won
2010	Best Actress on Television	Evangeline Lilly	Nominated
2010	Best Supporting Actor on Television	Jeremy Davies	Nominated
2010	Best Supporting Actor on Television	Michael Emerson	Nominated
2010	Best Supporting Actress on Television	Elizabeth Mitchell	Nominated
2010	Best Guest Starring Role on Television	Mark Pellegrino	Nominated
2010	Best DVD Television Release	Lost – The Complete Fifth Season	Won
2011	Best Network Television Series		Nominated
2011	Best Actor on Television	Matthew Fox	Nominated
2011	Best Supporting Actor on Television	Michael Emerson	Nominated
2011	Best Supporting Actor on Television	Terry O'Quinn	Nominated
2011	Best Guest Starring Role on Television	John Terry	Nominated
2011	Best DVD/Blu-Ray Television Release	Lost – The Complete Sixth and Final Season	Nominated

== TCA Awards ==
The TCA Awards are presented annually by the Television Critics Association in recognition of excellence in television. Lost has won four: Outstanding New Program in 2005 and Outstanding Achievement in Drama in 2005, 2006, and 2010.

Year	Category	Nominee	Result
2005	Outstanding New Program		Won
2005	Outstanding Achievement in Drama		Won
2005	Program of the Year		Nominated
2005	Individual Achievement in Drama	Matthew Fox	Nominated
2006	Outstanding Achievement in Drama		Won
2006	Program of the Year		Nominated
2007	Outstanding Achievement in Drama		Nominated
2008	Program of the Year		Nominated
2008	Outstanding Achievement in Drama		Nominated
2009	Program of the Year		Nominated
2009	Outstanding Achievement in Drama		Nominated
2010	Program of the Year		Nominated
2010	Outstanding Achievement in Drama		Won (Note: Tied with Breaking Bad)
2010	TCA Heritage Award		Nominated
2012	TCA Heritage Award		Nominated
2013	TCA Heritage Award		Nominated
2014	TCA Heritage Award		Nominated

== Teen Choice Awards ==
The Teen Choice Awards are voted on by teenagers. Lost has been nominated for 33 awards, but has never won a single award. Evangeline Lilly has been nominated for eight awards and Matthew Fox has been nominated for seven, while Jorge Garcia and Josh Holloway have each been nominated for four.

Year	Category	Nominee(s)	Result
2005	Choice TV Actor: Drama	Matthew Fox	Nominated
2005	Choice TV Actress: Drama	Evangeline Lilly	Nominated
2005	Choice TV: Breakout Actress	Maggie Grace	Nominated
2005	Choice TV: Breakout Actress	Evangeline Lilly	Nominated
2005	Choice TV: Breakout Actor	Jorge Garcia	Nominated
2005	Choice TV: Breakout Actor	Josh Holloway	Nominated
2005	Choice TV: Breakout Actor	Ian Somerhalder	Nominated
2005	Choice TV: Breakout Show		Nominated
2005	Choice TV: Chemistry	Matthew Fox and Evangeline Lilly	Nominated
2005	Choice TV Show: Drama		Nominated
2005	Choice TV: Sidekick	Jorge Garcia	Nominated
2006	Choice TV Actor: Drama	Matthew Fox	Nominated
2006	Choice TV Actress: Drama	Evangeline Lilly	Nominated
2006	Choice TV: Chemistry	Matthew Fox, Evangeline Lilly, and Josh Holloway	Nominated
2006	Choice TV Show: Drama		Nominated
2006	Choice TV: Sidekick	Jorge Garcia	Nominated
2007	Choice TV Actor: Drama	Matthew Fox	Nominated
2007	Choice TV Actress: Drama	Evangeline Lilly	Nominated
2007	Choice TV Show: Drama		Nominated
2007	Choice TV: Sidekick	Jorge Garcia	Nominated
2007	Choice TV: Villain	Michael Emerson	Nominated
2008	Choice TV Show: Action		Nominated
2008	Choice TV Actor: Action	Matthew Fox	Nominated
2008	Choice TV Actor: Action	Josh Holloway	Nominated
2008	Choice TV Actress: Action	Evangeline Lilly	Nominated
2009	Choice TV Show: Action		Nominated
2009	Choice TV Actor: Action	Matthew Fox	Nominated
2009	Choice TV Actor: Action	Josh Holloway	Nominated
2010	Choice TV Show: Fantasy/Sci-Fi		Nominated
2010	Choice TV Actor: Fantasy/Sci-Fi	Josh Holloway	Nominated
2010	Choice TV Actress: Fantasy/Sci-Fi	Evangeline Lilly	Nominated
2010	Choice TV: Villain	Terry O'Quinn	Nominated

== Writers Guild of America Awards ==
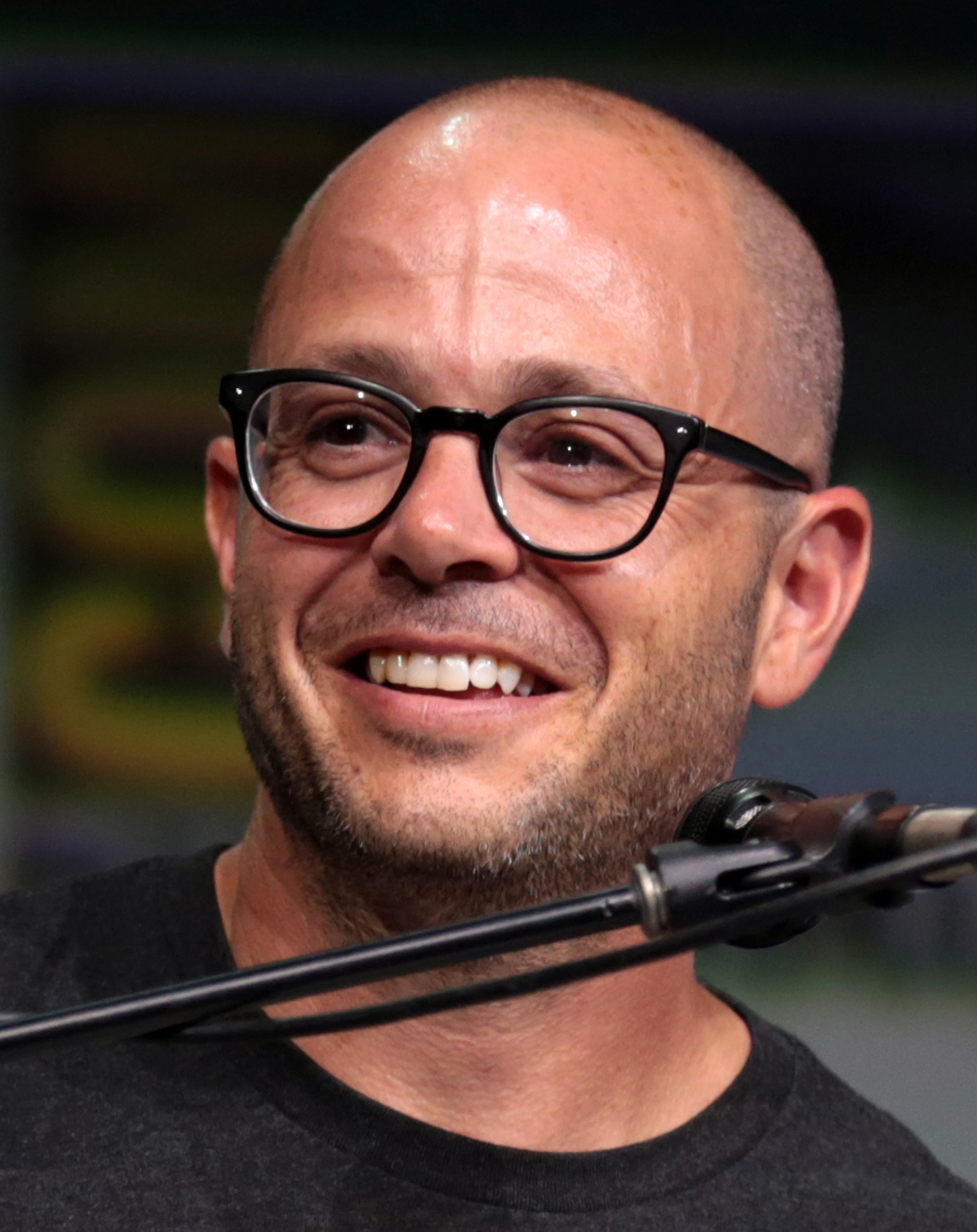
Co-creator and executive producer Damon Lindelof has been nominated for six Writers Guild of America Awards, winning once in 2006

The Writers Guild of America Awards are presented annually by the Writers Guild of America. Lost has been nominated four times for Dramatic Series, winning in 2006. The duos of Elizabeth Sarnoff & Christina M. Kim, Damon Lindelof & Drew Goddard, and Lindelof & Carlton Cuse have all received individual nominations.

Year	Category	Nominee(s)	Result
2006	Dramatic Series	J. J. Abrams, Kim Clements, Carlton Cuse, Leonard Dick, Paul Dini, Brent Fletcher, David Fury, Drew Goddard, Javier Grillo-Marxuach, Adam Horowitz, Jennifer M. Johnson, Christina M. Kim, Edward Kitsis, Jeffrey Lieber, Damon Lindelof, Lynne E. Litt, Monica Macer, Steven Maeda, Elizabeth Sarnoff, Janet Tamaro, Christian Taylor, and Craig Wright	Won
2007	Dramatic Series	J. J. Abrams, Carlton Cuse, Leonard Dick, Drew Goddard, Javier Grillo-Marxuach, Adam Horowitz, Dawn Lambertsen Kelly, Christina M. Kim, Edward Kitsis, Damon Lindelof, Steven Maeda, Monica Owusu-Breen, Jeff Pinkner, Matt Ragghianti, Elizabeth Sarnoff, and Alison Schapker	Nominated
2007	Episodic Drama	Elizabeth Sarnoff and Christina M. Kim for "Two for the Road"	Nominated
2008	Episodic Drama	Damon Lindelof and Drew Goddard for "Flashes Before Your Eyes"	Nominated
2009	Dramatic Series	Carlton Cuse, Drew Goddard, Adam Horowitz, Christina M. Kim, Edward Kitsis, Damon Lindelof, Greg Nations, Kyle Pennington, Elizabeth Sarnoff, and Brian K. Vaughan	Nominated
2010	Dramatic Series	Carlton Cuse, Adam Horowitz, Melinda Hsu Taylor, Edward Kitsis, Damon Lindelof, Greg Nations, Kyle Pennington, Elizabeth Sarnoff, Brian K. Vaughan, and Paul Zbyszewski	Nominated
2011	Episodic Drama	Damon Lindelof and Carlton Cuse for "The End"	Nominated

== Other awards ==
In 2005, the series and its ensemble were named "Entertainers of the Year" by Entertainment Weekly. In 2008, cast members Yunjin Kim and Daniel Dae Kim placed seventeenth on the list of the "25 Entertainers of the Year". Lost has had success at various guild and society awards, having been nominated for awards at a dozen ceremonies and winning eight. In 2007, Jack Bender, Carlton Cuse and Damon Lindelof won the Golden Nymph Award for Best Drama Series at the Monte-Carlo Television Festival. On April 1, 2009, it was announced that Lost had won a Peabody Award for "rewrit[ing] the rules of television fiction".

Year	Award	Category	Nominee(s) / Work	Result
2006	ALMA Awards	Outstanding Supporting Actress in a Television Series	Michelle Rodriguez	Won
2006	ALMA Awards	Outstanding Supporting Actor in a Television Series	Jorge Garcia	Won
2007	ALMA Awards	Outstanding Supporting Actor in a Television Series, Miniseries, or Television Movie	Jorge Garcia	Nominated
2008	ALMA Awards	Outstanding Supporting Actor in a Drama Television Series	Jorge Garcia	Won
2009	ALMA Awards	Outstanding Actor in a Drama Series	Jorge Garcia	Nominated
2009	ALMA Awards	Outstanding Actor in a Drama Series	Néstor Carbonell	Nominated
2009	ALMA Awards	Outstanding Actress in a Drama Series	Michelle Rodriguez	Nominated
2006	American Cinema Editors Awards	Best Edited One-Hour Series for Commercial Television	Stephen Semel for "Outlaws"	Won
2007	American Cinema Editors Awards	Best Edited Miniseries or Motion Picture for Commercial Television	Sue Blainey, Sarah Boyd, and Stephen Semel for "Live Together, Die Alone"	Nominated
2008	American Cinema Editors Awards	Best Edited Miniseries or Motion Picture for Commercial Television	Mark J. Goldman, Christopher Nelson, Stephen Semel, and Henk Van Eeghen for "Through the Looking Glass"	Nominated
2009	American Cinema Editors Awards	Best Edited Miniseries or Motion Picture for Commercial Television	Robert Florio, Mark J. Goldman, Stephen Semel, and Henk Van Eeghen for "There's No Place Like Home"	Nominated
2010	American Cinema Editors Awards	Best Edited One-Hour Series for Commercial Television	Christopher Nelson for "The Life and Death of Jeremy Bentham"	Nominated
2004	American Film Institute Awards	TV Program of the Year	Season 1, Part 1	Won
2005	American Film Institute Awards	TV Program of the Year	Season 1, Part 2 + Season 2, Part 1	Won
2008	American Film Institute Awards	TV Program of the Year	Season 4	Won
2005	American Society of Cinematographers Awards	Outstanding Achievement in Cinematography in Movies of the Week/Mini-Series/Pilot	Larry Fong for "Pilot"	Nominated
2005	Art Directors Guild Awards	Excellence in Production Design for a One-Hour Period or Fantasy Single-Camera Series	Christina Wilson, Mark Worthington, and Ray Yamagata for "Pilot"	Nominated
2006	Art Directors Guild Awards	Excellence in Production Design for a One-Hour Period or Fantasy Single-Camera Series	William F. Matthews and Jim H. Spencer for "Orientation"	Nominated
2008	Art Directors Guild Awards	Excellence in Production Design for a One-Hour Period or Fantasy Single-Camera Series	Scott Cobb, Zack Grobler, and Andrew Murdock for "Through the Looking Glass"	Nominated
2005	Artios Awards	Best Dramatic Pilot Casting	April Webster	Won
2005	Artios Awards	Best Dramatic Episodic Casting	April Webster and Mandy Sherman	Nominated
2006	Artios Awards	Best Dramatic Episodic Casting	Veronica Collins Rooney, Mandy Sherman, and April Webster	Nominated
2008	Artios Awards	Outstanding Achievement in Casting – Television Series – Drama	Veronica Collins Rooney and April Webster	Nominated
2005	ASCAP Film and Television Music Awards	Top Television Series	J. J. Abrams and Michael Giacchino	Won
2006	ASCAP Film and Television Music Awards	Top Television Series	J. J. Abrams and Michael Giacchino	Won
2009	ASCAP Film and Television Music Awards	Top Television Series	J. J. Abrams and Michael Giacchino	Won
2006	BAFTA TV Awards	New Media Developer	Tracy Blacher, Mark Limb, and Janine Smith for "Lost Untold"	Nominated
2007	BAFTA TV Awards	Best International	J. J. Abrams, Jack Bender, Carlton Cuse, and Damon Lindelof	Nominated
2005	BMI Film & TV Awards	BMI TV Music Award	Michael Giacchino	Won
2005	Cinema Audio Society Awards	Outstanding Achievement in Sound Mixing for Television Series – One Hour	Frank Morrone, Scott Weber, and David Yaffe for "Pilot"	Nominated
2007	Cinema Audio Society Awards	Outstanding Achievement in Sound Mixing for Television Series – One Hour	Robert J. Anderson Jr., Frank Morrone, and Scott Weber for "I Do"	Nominated
2009	Cinema Audio Society Awards	Outstanding Achievement in Sound Mixing for Television Series – One Hour	Robert J. Anderson Jr., Frank Morrone, and Scott Weber for "Meet Kevin Johnson"	Nominated
2004	Family Television Awards	Best Drama		Won
2005	Family Television Awards	Best New Series		Won
2004	Hugo Awards	Best Dramatic Presentation – Short Form	"Pilot"	Nominated
2009	Hugo Awards	Best Dramatic Presentation – Short Form	"The Constant"	Nominated
2007	Imagen Awards	Best Primetime Television Program		Nominated
2007	Imagen Awards	Best Supporting Actor – Television	Jorge Garcia	Nominated
2009	Imagen Awards	Best Primetime Television Program		Nominated
2009	Imagen Awards	Best Supporting Actor – Television	Jorge Garcia	Nominated
2010	Imagen Awards	Best Primetime Television Program		Nominated
2010	Imagen Awards	Best Actor – Television	Néstor Carbonell	Nominated
2010	Imagen Awards	Best Actor – Television	Jorge Garcia	Nominated
2005	International Horror Guild Awards	Best Television		Won
2008	JC Penney Asian Excellence Awards	Outstanding Television Actress	Yunjin Kim	Nominated
2006	NAACP Image Awards	Outstanding Drama Series		Nominated
2007	NAACP Image Awards	Outstanding Directing in a Drama Series	Karen Gaviola for "The Whole Truth"	Won
2006	National Television Awards	Most Popular Actor	Matthew Fox	Nominated
2006	National Television Awards	Most Popular Actress	Evangeline Lilly	Nominated
2006	National Television Awards	Most Popular Drama		Nominated
2009	Peabody Award		Season 5	Won
2005	People's Choice Awards	Favorite New Television Drama		Nominated
2009	People's Choice Awards	Favorite TV Drama		Nominated
2009	People's Choice Awards	Favorite TV Drama Actor	Matthew Fox	Nominated
2009	People's Choice Awards	Favorite Sci-Fi/Fantasy Show		Nominated
2005	Prism Awards	TV Drama Series Multi-Episode Storyline	"Pilot", "House of the Rising Sun", and "The Moth"	Won (Note: Tied with Queer as Folk)
2005	Prism Awards	Performance in a Drama Series Storyline	Dominic Monaghan	Nominated
2008	Prism Awards	Performance in a Drama Series Episode	Matthew Fox	Nominated
2008	Prism Awards	Drama Episode	"Through the Looking Glass"	Nominated
2006	Producers Guild of America Awards	Outstanding Producer of Episodic Television – Drama	J. J. Abrams, Jack Bender, Bryan Burk, Carlton Cuse, Jean Higgins, and Damon Lindelof	Won
2007	Producers Guild of America Awards	Outstanding Producer of Episodic Television – Drama	J. J. Abrams, Jack Bender, Bryan Burk, Carlton Cuse, Jean Higgins, Adam Horowitz, Edward Kitsis, Damon Lindelof, and Elizabeth Sarnoff	Nominated
2008	Producers Guild of America Awards	Outstanding Producer of Episodic Television – Drama	J. J. Abrams, Jack Bender, Bryan Burk, Carlton Cuse, Jean Higgins, Adam Horowitz, Edward Kitsis, Damon Lindelof, and Elizabeth Sarnoff	Nominated
2009	Producers Guild of America Awards	Outstanding Producer of Episodic Television – Drama	Jack Bender, Carlton Cuse, Ra'uf Glasgow, Drew Goddard, Jean Higgins, Adam Horowitz, Edward Kitsis, Damon Lindelof, Elizabeth Sarnoff, and Stephen Williams	Nominated
2010	Producers Guild of America Awards	Outstanding Producer of Episodic Television – Drama	Jack Bender, Carlton Cuse, Ra'uf Glasgow, Jean Higgins, Adam Horowitz, Edward Kitsis, Damon Lindelof, Elizabeth Sarnoff, Stephen Williams, and Paul Zbyszewski	Nominated
2011	Producers Guild of America Awards	Outstanding Producer of Episodic Television – Drama	Jack Bender, Bryan Burk, Carlton Cuse, Ra'uf Glasgow, Jean Higgins, Adam Horowitz, Edward Kitsis, Damon Lindelof, Elizabeth Sarnoff, and Paul Zbyszewski	Nominated
2006	Screen Actors Guild Awards	Outstanding Performance by an Ensemble in a Drama Series	Adewale Akinnuoye-Agbaje, Naveen Andrews, Emilie de Ravin, Matthew Fox, Jorge Garcia, Maggie Grace, Josh Holloway, Malcolm David Kelley, Daniel Dae Kim, Yunjin Kim, Evangeline Lilly, Dominic Monaghan, Terry O'Quinn, Harold Perrineau, Michelle Rodriguez, Ian Somerhalder, and Cynthia Watros	Won
2008	Screen Actors Guild Awards	Outstanding Performance by a Stunt Ensemble in a Television Series	Heather Arthur, Shauna Duggins, David Hugghins, Michael Hugghins, John Medlen, Mike Rufino, and Ronn Surels	Nominated
2005	Visual Effects Society Awards	Outstanding Supporting Visual Effects in a Broadcast Program	Kevin Blank, Benoit Girard, Jerome Morin, and Mitch Suskin for "Pilot", Part 2	Won
2006	Visual Effects Society Awards	Outstanding Supporting Visual Effects in a Broadcast Program	Kevin Blank, Eric Chauvin, Mitchell Ferm, and John Teska for "Exodus", Part 2	Won
2010	Visual Effects Society Awards	Outstanding Supporting Visual Effects in a Broadcast Program	Eric Hance, Samantha Mabie-Tuinstra, Sean M. Scott, and Mitch Suskin for "The Incident"	Nominated
2011	Visual Effects Society Awards	Outstanding Supporting Visual Effects in a Broadcast Program	Adam Avitabile, Michael Capton, Michael Degtjarewsky, and Melinka Thompson-Godoy	Nominated
2005	Women's Image Network Awards	Actor in Drama Series	Josh Holloway for "Whatever the Case May Be"	Nominated
2005	Women's Image Network Awards	Actress in Drama Series	Evangeline Lilly for "Whatever the Case May Be"	Nominated
2005	Young Artist Awards	Best Performance in a TV Series (Comedy or Drama) – Leading Young Actor	Malcolm David Kelley	Nominated
2006	Young Artist Awards	Best Performance in a TV Series (Drama) – Supporting Young Actor	Malcolm David Kelley	Won
2007	Young Artist Awards	Best Performance in a TV Series (Comedy or Drama) – Guest Starring Young Actor	Kolawole Obileye Jr.	Nominated
2010	Young Artist Awards	Best Performance in a TV Series – Guest Starring Young Actress	Savannah Lathem	Nominated
2010	Young Artist Awards	Best Performance in a TV Series – Recurring Young Actor 13 and Under	Sterling Beaumon	Nominated
2011	Young Artist Awards	Best Performance in a TV Series – Recurring Young Actor	Dylan Minnette	Nominated
