= Frank Morrone =

Frank Morrone CAS
- Occupation: Re-recording mixer
- Organization(s): AMPAS, ATAS, MPEG, MPSE, CAS
- Known for: TV, Film, Soundtrack, Music
- Notable work: Lost,Sleepy Hollow,When We Were Kings,The Kennedys,Ransom
- Board member of: ATAS, MPEG, MPSE, CAS (past & present)
- Awards: Emmy, Golden Reel, Gemini, Satellite, CAS (nom)

Frank Morrone is an independent re-recording mixer who has worked extensively in both film and television. His award winning work includes Emmy Awards for the ABC hit LOST and the mini-series The Kennedys as well as a best sound Satellite Award for Tim Burton's Sleepy Hollow.

He has served as a Governor for the Academy of Television Arts & Sciences and as President of the Motion Picture Sound Editors. He has also been elected to the Motion Picture Editors Guild board of directors to represent re-recording mixers and served as Vice President of the Motion Picture Sound Editors from 2005 to 2013. In addition to these associations, he is a member of the Academy of Motion Picture Arts and Sciences, NARAS, SOCAN, Academy of Canadian Cinema & Television and the Cinema Audio Society where he has served on the board of directors.

== Career ==
He began his career mixing music for film scores as well as jazz, rock and country albums. His music projects include Amin Bhatia’s 5.1 mix The Interstellar Suite, Sunny Days Again: The Best of Lighthouse remix and A Christmas Story soundtrack. He has received a platinum album for his contributions to the Camp Rock soundtrack. From music mixing, he transitioned to film and television post production initially editing music and dialogue and then moving in to re-recording mixing. In 1995, he accepted a position at Todd AO New York mixing film and television, where he also lectured for NYU Film School. He moved to Los Angeles in 2004 to work with JJ Abrams on Lost, and has since mixed several projects for Sony and Disney as well as freelance projects for several other studios. He has written articles for industry publications including Mix Magazine and Canadian Musician. He has collaborated on product development with Digidesign, McDSP and M-Audio and lectures at well-known colleges across North America for Avid such as USC, Full Sail and Tribeca Flashpoint. He has been elected to serve on several key industry organization Boards of Directors including ATAS, MPEG, MPSE and CAS.

== Awards and nominations ==
Emmy Awards
2012 – Person of Interest – Pilot (Nominated)
2011 – The Kennedys: Lancer And Lace (Won)
2010 – Lost: The End (Nominated)
2009 – Lost: The Incident (Nominated)
2008 – Lost: Meet Kevin Johnson (Won)
2006 – Lost: Live Together, Die Alone (Nominated)
2005 – Lost: Outlaws (Nominated)

Cinema Audio Society Awards
2012 – The Kennedys (Nominated)
2009 – Lost (Nominated)
2007 – Lost (Nominated)
2005 – Lost (Nominated)

MPSE Golden Reel Awards
2010 – Wizards of Waverly Place: The Movie (Nominated)
1987 – Captain Power and the Soldiers of the Future (Won)
1987 – Ford the Man & the Machine (Won)

Gemini Awards
2011 – The Kennedys (Nominated)
1989 – Glory Enough for All (Won)
1987 – Ford the Man and the Machine (Nominated)

Satellite Award
1999 – Sleepy Hollow (Won)

TEC Awards
2008 – Lost (Nominated)
2007 – Lost (Nominated)
2006 – Lost (Nominated)
2005 – Lost (Nominated)

== Selected credits ==
=== Television ===
Last Resort – 2012 – Shawn Ryan / Karl J Gajdusek
Raising Hope – 2012 – Greg Garcia (producer)
Copper – 2012–2013 – Barry Levinson/ Tom Fontana / BBC
The Killing Game – 2011 – Bobby Roth/ Anne Carlucci/Lifetime
Boss – 2011 – Kelsey Grammer/Gus Van Sant /Farhad Safinia
Alcatraz (pilot) – 2011 – J. J. Abrams// Bad Robot
Person of Interest (pilot) – 2011 – J. J. Abrams// Bad Robot
Once Upon a Time (pilot) – 2011 – Adam Horowitz (screenwriter)/Edward Kitsis
The Kennedys – 2011 – Jon Cassar/ Joel Surnow
Undercovers – 2010 – J. J. Abrams//Bad Robot
Lost – 2004–2010 – J. J. Abrams/ABC/Touchstone TV
The Day of the Triffids – 2009 – Nick Copus/BBC
Wizards of Waverly Place: The Movie – 2009 – Lev L. Spiro/ Disney Channel
Princess Protection Program – 2009 – Allison Liddi-Brown/ Disney Channel
The Cheetah Girls: One World – 2008 – Paul Hoen/ Disney Channel
Camp Rock – 2008 – Matthew Diamond/ Disney Channel
Snow 2: Brain Freeze – 2008 – Mark Rosman/ABC Family Channel
The L Word (season 5) – 2008 – Ilene Chaiken/Showtime
Tyrannosaurus Azteca – 2007 – Brian Trenchard-Smith
What About Brian (Pilot) – 2006 – Dana Stevens/J. J. AbramsABC/Touchstone
Queens Supreme – 2003 – Tim Robbins / CBS
Miss America – 2002 – Lisa Ades
Fling – 2001 – Glenn Gordon Caron
100 Center Street (33 eps) – 2001 – Sidney Lumet
First Person – 2001 – Errol Morris
Shades of Dust – 2001 – Danny Aiello III
The Independent – 2000 – Steve Kessler/Jerry Weintraub
Wonderland – 2000 – Peter Berg/John David Coles/Brian Grazer
Sex and the City (seasons 1–2) – 1998–99 – Darren Star/ HBO
Dellaventura – 1997–98 – Danny Aiello / CBS
Bye, Bye Birdie – 1995 – Robert Halmi Sr/Gene Saks/Boyce Harmon
Derby – 1995 – Bob Clark
Mysterious Island – 1995 – Alliance Films/Atlantis
Tek War – 1994–96 – William Shatner/Alliance
It Runs in the Family – 1994 – Bob Clark/ MGM
Destiny Ridge – 1993 – Anne Marie La Traverse/Atlantis Films
The American Clock – 1993 – Bob Clark
Scales of Justice – 1992 – George Jonas/CBC
Kung Fu: The Legend Continues – 1992 – David Carradine, Michael Sloan/USA Ntwk
War of the Worlds – 1990 – Frank Mancuso Jr./Greg Strangis/Paramount
My Secret Identity – 1988–91 – Brian Levant/Fred Fox Jr/Paramount
Dracula – Allan Eastman/Wendy Grean/Paragon
Small Sacrifices – 1989 – David Greene
The Jim Henson Hour – 1989–92 – Jim Henson
Glory Enough for All – 1988 – Eric Till/Gordon Hench/Gemstone Prod.
Captain Power and the Soldiers of the Future – 1987–88 – Gary Goddard/Landmark Ent
Ford: The Man and The Machine – 1987 – Allan Eastman

=== Feature films ===
Justin Bieber – Believe – 2013 – Jon Chu
Strangely in Love – 2012 – Amin Matalqa
Small Time – 2012 – Joel Surnow
Happy & Bleeding – 2012 – Christian Charles/ Anne Estonilo
The Killing Game – 2011 – Bobby Roth/ Anne Carlucci/Lifetime
The United – 2011 – Amin Matalqa/Walt Disney Pictures
Never Back Down 2: The Beatdown – 2011 – Michael Jai White
Gnomeo & Juliet (temp) – 2011 – Kelly Asbury
Sideways – 2010 – Cellin Gluck
Morning Light – 2008 – Mark Monroe / Roy E. Disney
Murder Dot Com – 2008 – Rex Piano/ Regent Films
Tyrannosaurus Azteca – 2007 – Brian Trenchard-Smith
Saving Luna – 2007 – Suzanne Chisholm/Michael Parfit
Full of It – 2007 – Christian Charles
Partition – 2007 – Vic Sarin
Love on the Side – 2004 – Vic Sarin
A Hole in One – 2004 – Richard Ledes
Slowly Silently – 2003 – Jinoh Park
Jersey Guy – 2003 – Elia Zois
Rhythm of the Saints – 2003 – Sarah Rogacki
Miss America – 2002 – Lisa Ades
Comedian – 2002 – Christian Charles / Jerry Seinfeld
First Person – 2001 – Errol Morris
Shades of Dust – 2001 – Danny Aiello III
The Independent – 2000 – Steve Kessler/Jerry Weintraub
Lost Souls – 2000 – Janusz Kamiński / Meg Ryan
Shaft – 2000 – Scott Rudin / Paramount
Up at the Villa – 2000 – Philip Haas
Ricky Six – 2000 – Peter Filardi
Sleepy Hollow – 1999 – Tim Burton
Mr. Death: The Rise and Fall of Fred A. Leuchter, Jr. – 1999 – Errol Morris
Fever – 1999 – Alex Winter
EDtv – 1999 – Ron Howard / Universal
Inventing the Abbotts – 1997 – Pat O’Connor/Fox
Under the Bridge – 1997 – Charles Weinstein
Childhoods End – 1997 – Jeff Lipsky
Ransom – 1996 – Ron Howard / Touchstone
Dear Diary – 1996 – David Frankel, Barry Jossen/DreamWorks
When We Were Kings – 1996 – Leon Gast/Taylor Hackford
The Daytrippers – 1996 – Greg Mottola
It Runs in the Family – 1994 – Bob Clark/ MGM
Paris France – 1993 – Jerry Ciccoritti/Alliance
Dieppe – 1993 John N. Smith – Foley mixer
Black Robe – 1991 – Bruce Beresford – ADR recordist

=== Music ===
The Interstellar Suite – 2012 – Amin Bhatia 5.1 mix
Sunny Days Again: The Best of Lighthouse – 1999 – Lighthouse remix
Tears Are Not Enough documentary – 1985 – music editor
A Christmas Story – Music from the Motion Picture – 1983 – recording & mixing engineer
A Christmas Story – 1983 – music engineer
My Bloody Valentine – 1981 – music engineer
Jack London's Tales of the Klondike – 1981 – music engineer
Being Different – 1981 – music engineer
You've Got To Be A Kid To Get In – Free Rose Corporation – 1981 – music engineer
The Entertainer – Artie MacLaren – 1980 – music engineer
Catherine McKinnon (self titled album) – Catherine McKinnon – 1980 – music engineer
The Kidnapping of the President – 1980 – music engineer
Prom Night – 1980 – music engineer
Murder by Decree – 1979 – music engineer

== Affiliations ==
- Academy of Television Arts and Sciences
- Academy of Motion Picture Arts and Sciences
- Cinema Audio Society
- Motion Picture Editors Guild
- Motion Picture Sound Editors
- Academy of Canadian Cinema and Television
- NARAS
- SOCAN
