= Patricia Churchill =

American film and television producer

Patricia Churchill is an American film and television producer. She has twice been nominated for the Emmy Award for best drama series for her work on the series Lost.

== Career ==
Higgins was hired as a producer for the third season of Lost in 2006. She remained a producer until the close of the fifth season in 2009. Higgins and the other producers were nominated for an Emmy Award for best drama series for her work on the fourth season at the September 2008 ceremony. They were nominated for the same award for the fifth season at the September 2009 ceremony.
