= Martin Jensen (sound engineer) =

Sound engineer

- Occupation: Sound engineer
- Years active: 2000-present

Martin Jensen is a sound engineer. He was nominated for an Academy Award in the category Best Sound Mixing for the film The King's Speech. He has worked on nearly 90 films and television shows since his start in 1990.

== Selected filmography ==
- Atonement (2007)
- The King's Speech (2010)
