= Jeffrey Perkins =

American sound engineer

- Occupation: Sound engineer
- Years active: 1984-present

Jeffrey Perkins is an American sound engineer. He won an Academy Award for Best Sound for the film Dances with Wolves. He has worked on more than 120 films since 1984.

== Selected filmography ==
- Dances with Wolves (1990)
- FernGully: The Last Rainforest (1992)
- The Santa Clause (1994)
- Gordy (1995)
- See Spot Run (2001)
