= Cinema Audio Society Awards 2008 =

Audio awards

45th CAS Awards

February 14, 2009

Theatrical Releases:
Slumdog Millionaire

The 45th Cinema Audio Society Awards, which were held on February 14, 2009, honored the outstanding achievements in sound mixing in film and television of 2008.

== Winners and nominees ==
=== Film ===
- Slumdog Millionaire
  - The Dark Knight
  - Iron Man
  - Quantum of Solace
  - WALL-E

=== Television ===
==== Series ====
- 24: Redemption
  - Dexter (Episode: "Turning Biminese")
  - House (Episode: "Lost Resort")
  - Lost (Episode: "Meet Kevin Johnson")
  - Mad Men (Episode: "The Jet Set")

==== Miniseries or Television Film ====
- John Adams (Episode: "Join or Die")
  - Generation Kill (Episode: "A Burning Dog")
  - John Adams (Episode: "Don't Tread on Me")
  - John Adams (Episode: "Independence")
  - Recount
