= Meet Kevin Johnson =

- Lost episode
- Episode no.: Season 4 Episode 8
- Directed by: Stephen Williams
- Written by: Elizabeth Sarnoff; Brian K. Vaughan
- Production code: 408
- Original air date: March 20, 2008
- Running time: 42 minutes

Guest appearances
- Cynthia Watros as Libby Smith; M.C. Gainey as Tom Friendly; Mira Furlan as Danielle Rousseau; Tania Raymonde as Alex; Blake Bashoff as Karl Martin; Marsha Thomason as Naomi Dorrit; Jeff Fahey as Frank Lapidus; Kevin Durand as Martin Keamy; Anthony Azizi as Omar; Fisher Stevens as George Minkowski; Grant Bowler as Captain Gault; Jill Kuramoto as Female anchor; Galyn Görg as Nurse; Starletta DuPois as Michael's mother; William P. Ogilivie as Gus; Francesco Simone as Arturo; James Locke as Jeff; Malcolm David Kelley as Walt Lloyd (uncredited)

Episode chronology
← Previous "Ji Yeon"	Next → "The Shape of Things to Come"
- Lost season 4

"Meet Kevin Johnson" is the eighth episode of the fourth season of the American science fiction drama television series Lost. It was written in October and November 2007 by supervising producer Elizabeth Sarnoff and co-producer Brian K. Vaughan, and filmed that November. The episode was directed by co-executive producer Stephen Williams. "Meet Kevin Johnson" first aired March 20, 2008, on American Broadcasting Company (ABC) in the United States and on CTV in Canada with a running time of 42 minutes.

In the second-season finale, after 67 days of being stranded on a mysterious and mystical tropical island, Oceanic Airlines 815 crash survivor Michael Dawson (played by Harold Perrineau) successfully negotiates his escape via motorboat with the island's dangerous original inhabitants, whom the survivors refer to as the "Others". One month later in the episode before "Meet Kevin Johnson", Michael reappears on a freighter offshore of the island, undercover with the alias "Kevin Johnson". Most of the narrative of "Meet Kevin Johnson" consists of a continuous flashback—the third longest in the show's history after "Across the Sea" and "The Other 48 Days"—showing what happened to Michael in the month that he spent away in New York and on the freighter, primarily his recruitment aboard the freighter Kahana as a spy for the Others.

The writers completed "Meet Kevin Johnson", the eighth of 16 ordered scripts, on the same day that the 2007–2008 Writers Guild of America strike action began. Post-production finished weeks later without input from the show's writers. ABC pledged to air the completed eight episodes regardless of the strike's resolution, but the writers felt that the episode's cliffhanger was unsuitable as a potential season finale. ABC ultimately overruled their opposition.

"Meet Kevin Johnson" was watched by 13 million Americans and was met with mixed reactions. A major discussion point was the episode's climax, which was criticized for its placement in the story and its focus on secondary characters. Although critics responded well to Michael's emotional journey, they complained that his physical journey seemed to conflict with Lost's timeline that had been laid out in previous episodes. The episode was honored with the fourth season's sole Primetime Emmy Award for its achievement in sound mixing.

== Plot ==
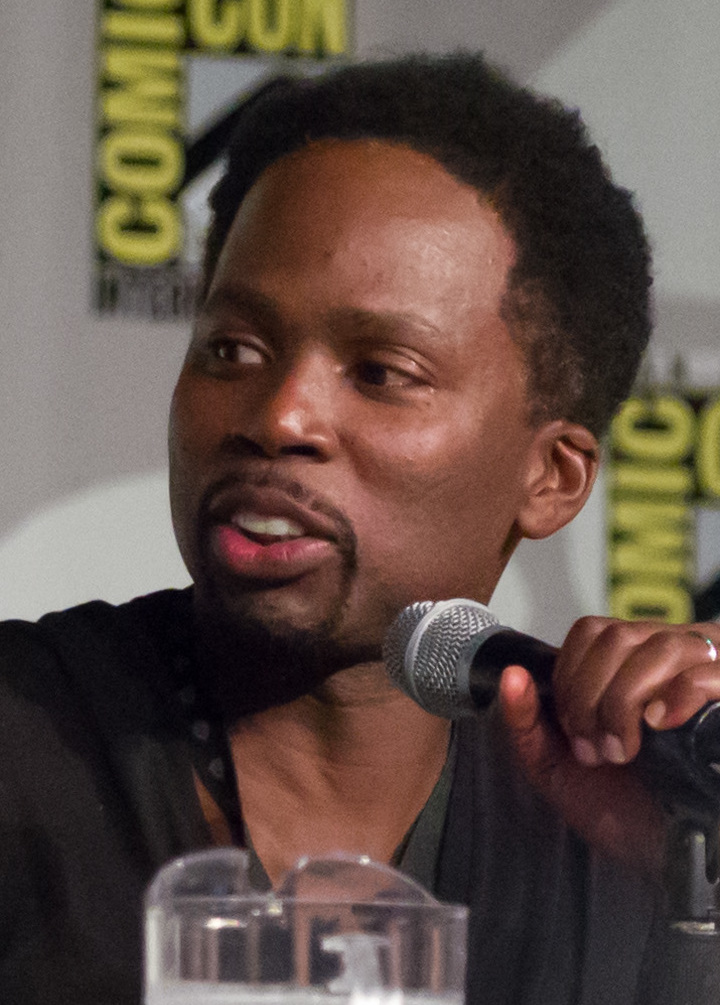
Harold Parrineau plays Michael, the central character of the episode.

The episode's opening is set on December 26, 2004, over three months after the crash of Oceanic 815. Sayid and Desmond are on the freighter Kahana, moored offshore of the island where the plane crashed. The freighter is owned by Charles Widmore (Alan Dale), who is intent on extracting the Others' leader Ben Linus (Michael Emerson). Captain Gault (Grant Bowler) stops two crewmembers from deserting the freighter in a raft. He publicly beats them and shouts that this is to save their lives, reminding the crew of what happened to George Minkowski (Fisher Stevens) when he left the boat. The next morning, Sayid Jarrah (Naveen Andrews) confronts Michael about his motivations, and the narrative shifts into an uninterrupted flashback of Michael's life after escaping from the island.

Michael and his son Walt Lloyd (Malcolm David Kelley) return to New York. Overcome with guilt, Michael confesses that he murdered Ana Lucia Cortez (Michelle Rodriguez) and Libby (Cynthia Watros) as part of his rescue of Walt from the Others' captivity. Michael becomes estranged from Walt, who goes to live with Michael's mother (Starletta DuPois). Michael is haunted by apparitions and nightmares of Libby. Michael attempts to kill himself twice, but is unsuccessful. That night, Michael is confronted by Tom (M.C. Gainey), the Other who abducted Walt. Tom explains that Widmore staged the wreckage of Flight 815 found in the ocean and is determined to find the island. He also explains that the island will not allow Michael to kill himself, and tasks Michael with infiltrating the freighter Kahana to kill everyone on board. Michael agrees to this and boards the freighter from Fiji. Michael becomes acquainted with the crew and hesitates to sabotage their mission until he finds Martin Keamy (Kevin Durand) and his associates target-practicing with machine guns. After Michael tries to detonate a provided bomb only to discover that it is a fake, Ben contacts Michael by radio and explains that the trick illustrated his stance against killing innocent people in his war against Widmore. The flashback ends and Sayid, appalled by Michael's association with Ben, exposes his duplicity to Gault.

On the island in the Others' abandoned Barracks where some of the survivors have taken residence, 815 survivor John Locke (Terry O'Quinn) meets with his faction to discuss the freighter and Ben reveals that Michael is spying for him there. Ben later urges his adopted daughter Alex (Tania Raymonde) to flee to the Others' sanctuary at the "Temple" for safety; she is accompanied by her biological mother Danielle Rousseau (Mira Furlan) and boyfriend Karl (Blake Bashoff). On their way, Karl and Rousseau are shot dead by hidden assailants and Alex surrenders.

== Production ==
=== Casting ===
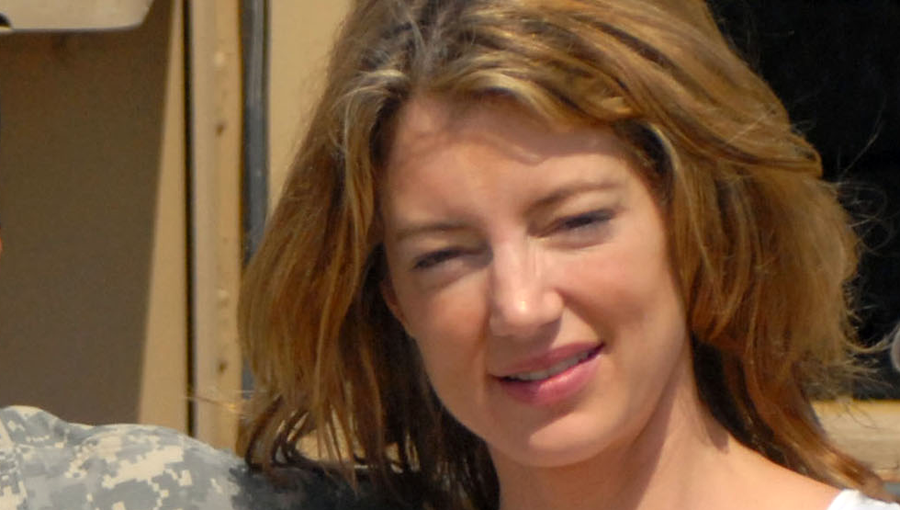
Cynthia Watros, who plays Libby, left the show in the second-season finale and returned as a guest star in this episode.

"Meet Kevin Johnson" features the first appearance of Cynthia Watros as Libby in Lost since the second-season finale. After her character's death in the second season, Watros became the first main cast member never to play the central role in a Lost episode. Several members of production stated that the character's backstory would be explained in later episodes, but this was continually postponed. Watros made a couple of appearances via hallucinations in Michael's flashbacks in "Meet Kevin Johnson". The writers asserted that while they had yet to shed light on the character's past, they would finally in their fifth year. When Watros returned to Lost for "Meet Kevin Johnson", she did not receive the "special guest star" credit, as was customary for former main cast members of Lost. She was instead billed simply as a guest star, although her name appeared with that of frequent guest star M.C. Gainey ahead of the remainder of the episode's guest cast, who were listed alphabetically on-screen. Damon Lindelof said that "it was sort of like a walk down memory lane for the dead", as the episode included several characters who died earlier on the show.

First-season regular cast member Malcolm David Kelley returned in an uncredited cameo for a single scene as Michael's ten-year-old son Walt without dialogue and from a distance. Fifteen-year-old Kelley said make-up was applied to him in an effort for him to look younger; Damon Lindelof and Carlton Cuse later clarified that footage of Kelley from production on the first season was composited into the shot. Because Kelley was so obscured and his name did not appear in the cast list, television critics were convinced that Walt had been recast.

Having appeared in six episodes of the third season and the first two of the fourth season, Blake Bashoff was cast as Moritz Stiefel in the Broadway production of Spring Awakening. He warned Damon Lindelof and Carlton Cuse that he would be unable to shoot Lost for at least six months beginning in December 2007, as he rehearsed for and performed in the production. The producers decided to that the character would die in this episode. The cliffhanger of "Meet Kevin Johnson" sees Karl shot dead by unseen killers in the jungle. Two episodes later, the character Miles Straume (Ken Leung) finds Karl partially buried in the jungle dirt, but this corpse is portrayed by a body double.

=== Writing ===
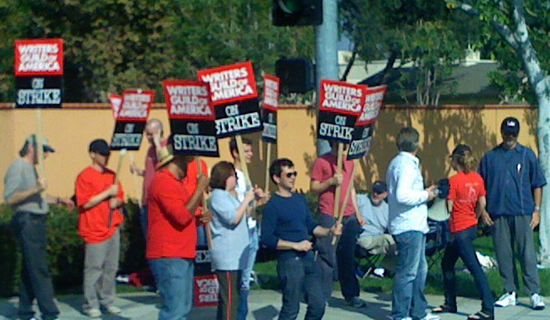
WGA members protest by the lot of Disney, the company that owns ABC.

The Writers Guild of America went on strike on November 4, 2007—the day that the writers finished editing the final draft of the script of "Meet Kevin Johnson". The writers wanted to hold the eight episodes until they were able to produce more of the season because the eighth episode has a "very cool" yet inconclusive cliffhanger that was not written to end the season; they compared it to "the end of an exciting book chapter [but] not the end of the novel." ABC decided that the eight episodes would be aired from January to March, regardless of whether anymore episodes were produced in the 2007–2008 season. After the strike's end on February 12, 2008, the writers pleaded with ABC to air "Meet Kevin Johnson" on April 17 with the second pod of episodes, due to "the eighth episode [being] non-traditional and the start of something new". ABC prioritized scheduling Grey's Anatomy, Ugly Betty and Lost's returns all for April 24.

Despite the struggles with the strike, the producers and writers were satisfied with the plot of the episode. Instead of being intercut with scenes from the main ongoing plot, the flashbacks of "Meet Kevin Johnson" are presented continuously and are only bookended by present-day scenes. This is the second episode to do this after "Flashes Before Your Eyes" from the third season. The flashback portion of "Meet Kevin Johnson" is the longest in Lost history, which was unintentional. When asked why Michael's alias was not an allusion to a literary or historical figure, as with other Lost characters, Damon Lindelof explained that the Others would not have picked a famous person as an alias, as that would cause others to be suspicious of the character. Lindelof also said that it was a coincidence that "Kevin Johnson" was also the name of an American basketball player.

In "Meet Kevin Johnson", Michael visits Tom's penthouse suite, where Tom introduces his partner Arturo (Francesco Simone), revealing that he is homosexual (and becomes Lost's only gay character). Online speculation about Tom's sexual orientation began after the broadcast of the third-season premiere, in which Tom tells Kate Austen (Evangeline Lilly) that she is "not [his] type". A few weeks later, the writers hinted that a character would eventually be revealed as gay. In response to the internet community's suspicions, actor M.C. Gainey began to play the character as such, subtly trying to flirt with Jack Shephard (Matthew Fox) and later claiming that this attraction "got [him] through the first half of the season." Following the broadcast of "Meet Kevin Johnson", Lindelof and Cuse confirmed that the line from the third-season premiere is an allusion to Tom's sexuality, but felt that it needed to be explicitly confirmed in the show.

Tom establishes that the island has some control over whether characters can die, as demonstrated when Michael attempts suicide three times. Cuse has said that "There is a raging debate on the show about what constitutes free will and what constitutes destiny and Michael's story was sort of a[n] argument on the destiny side of that equation. He had more destiny to fulfil with that island than he anticipated and maybe the audience anticipated." Elizabeth Sarnoff stated that "the island doesn't let you go until it's done with you and I think that the rest of our characters are going to feel the reverberations of that, as well."

=== Filming ===
Shooting commenced in early November and concluded on November 27, 2007. The strike suspended the script for the next episode and freed the cast and crew from an immediate deadline, with the result that more time was spent on filming "Meet Kevin Johnson" than the average Lost episode. Shooting did not customarily overlap with the surrounding episodes, although it was produced simultaneously with the Lost: Missing Pieces mobisodes directed by executive producer Jack Bender and one scene from the season premiere overseen by co-executive producer Jean Higgins.

The exterior freighter scenes were filmed on an actual freighter, while interior scenes were filmed both on sets and in the freighter. The production crew had intended for the engine room scene where Michael goes to detonate the bomb and sees Libby to be shot in the freighter's engine room; instead, they built a new engine room set based on that inside the freighter. It was extremely hot on the set at around 105 °F (41 °C) and the crew was unable to install air conditioning. Sculptor Jim Van Houten created twin twenty four foot (seven meter) marine engines for the set, primarily from urethane foam.

One New York flashback was filmed on the same Honolulu, Hawaii, street that had been used by set decorator Carol Bayne Kelley as Berlin, Germany in the fourth season's "The Economist" and London, England in the third season's "Flashes Before Your Eyes". The cliffhanger, in which Alex, Karl and Rousseau are in the jungle, was shot at Dillingham Ranch on the northwest tip of Oahu near the beach where the pilot and other early episodes were primarily filmed. The scene originally ended with "snipers emerging through the jungle in these incredible, elaborate, jungle camouflage uniforms"; however, this was cut in post-production. Elements of this would be re-shot and used in the next episode when the snipers are identified.

=== Editing ===
Despite picketing on most days with his fellow Lost writers, Carlton Cuse, a member of the WGA negotiating committee, continued to oversee post-production in late November. When negotiations between the Guild and the Alliance of Motion Picture and Television Producers broke down in early December, he boycotted his producing duties on the show until the strike was resolved.

In addition to Michael Giacchino's original score, "Meet Kevin Johnson" contained popular music diegetically. The song playing on Michael's car radio during his first suicide attempt is "It's Getting Better", performed by "Mama" Cass Elliot. The song is heard again, fleetingly, during Michael's vision of Libby in the ship's engine room. Elliot's rendition of the song was released as a single in 1969 and was included on her album Bubblegum, Lemonade, and... Something for Mama later the same year. Lost previously played Elliot's "Make Your Own Kind of Music" throughout the second season.

== Reception ==
=== Ratings ===
Dubbed "the most anticipated Lost [episode] of the season" by Verne Gay of Newsday due to Michael's flashbacks, "Meet Kevin Johnson" was watched live or recorded and watched within five hours of broadcast by 11.461 million viewers in the United States. Despite ranking ninth for the week in television programs with the most viewers, "Meet Kevin Johnson" set a new record as the lowest-rated episode in Lost's history, although this title was taken two episodes later with the broadcast of "Something Nice Back Home". "Meet Kevin Johnson" achieved a fifth-place 4.6/12 in the coveted adults aged eighteen to forty-nine demographic for the week. Including those who watched within seven days of broadcast, the episode was watched by a total of 13.386 million American viewers. 1.421 million Canadians watched "Meet Kevin Johnson", making Lost the eighth most-viewed show of the week. The episode brought in 618,000 viewers in Australia, placing it as the twenty-fourth most watched show of the night.

=== Critical response ===
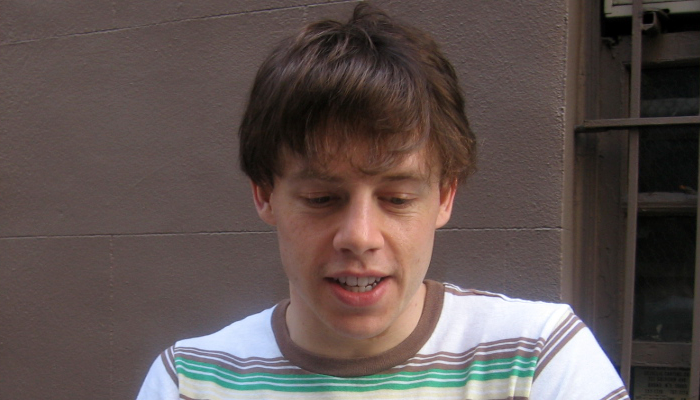
Actor Blake Bashoff, who plays Karl, left Lost for Broadway theater.

Critics and fans alike criticized the writers' seeming disregard for the Lost timeline. Based on the actions and whereabouts of characters in the third season, fans could deduce when parts of Michael's flashbacks occurred in relation to events on the island, and critics pointed out that the chronology was inconsistent with events in the third season and an earlier episode of the same season. This episode's negative critiques on fan message boards was highlighted by Lindelof as a reason why he avoids them, and said in defense of the script that "it's television."

The episode's plot received mixed reviews from critics. Digital Spy's Ben Rawson-Jones lauded the lack of interruption to the flashback and praised the writing of the episode, while TV Squad's Erin Martell was unsatisfied with the flashback and the exclusion of Walt from the plot, wondering how the characters explained their absence in the real world. Steve Heisler, writing for Time Out, felt the story was predictable, while John Kubicek, writing for BuddyTV, commented that the flashback did not reveal much new information to the audience. Oscar Dahl at BuddyTV ranked it as the second worst episode of the season.

Some critics acclaimed Michael's character development and emotional struggles. Dan Compora of SyFy Portal enjoyed seeing dead characters in flashbacks and commended Perrineau's performance and character's story, while criticizing the underutilization of the rest of the main cast. Glatfelter had mixed feelings for the revelation of Tom's sexual orientation, while the San Francisco Chronicle's Tim Goodman referred to "Gay Tom" as "a unique and funny twist".

The cliffhanger, in which Rousseau and Karl are killed and Alex calls out in desperation that she is Ben's daughter, gained a mixed response. IGN's Chris Carabott called the scene "completely out of place" and Rawson-Jones said that the fate of the three characters was not interesting to the audience. Jay Glatfelter of The Huffington Post deemed the cliffhanger "a shocker". while Entertainment Weekly's Jeff Jensen felt that network executives were partially to blame for going against the wish of the show's creative team to broadcast "Meet Kevin Johnson" as a midseason premiere as opposed to a midseason finale.

In retrospectives of the show, reviewers had various opinions on the episode's plot. Josh Wigler twice ranked the episode as one of the worst of the series, citing a convoluted storyline, and Jacob Stolworthy, writing in The Independent, also ranked the episode as one of the weakest of the series and criticized the large amount of plot in the episode. The episode was ranked 44th out of 113 episodes by the IGN staff, who praised how the episode presented Michael's time off the island.

=== Awards ===
The Academy of Television Arts & Sciences gave sound production mixer Robert "Bobby" Anderson and re-recording mixers Frank Morrone and Scott Weber the Primetime Emmy Award for Outstanding Sound Mixing for a Comedy or Drama Series (One-Hour) for their work on this episode. It was Lost's only Primetime Emmy Award win in 2008. Anderson discussed his job for an Easter egg featurette on the DVD and Blu-ray releases of Lost: The Complete Fourth Season – The Expanded Experience. Lost was sometimes filmed just two hundred yards (180 metres) from the Kamehameha Highway and the traffic noise drowned out filmed dialogue, as did the ocean waves, so Anderson had the actors loop their relatively quiet lines on an automated dialogue replacement (ADR) sound stage.
