= The Cost of Living (Lost) =

- Lost episode
- Episode no.: Season 3 Episode 5
- Directed by: Jack Bender
- Written by: Alison Schapker; Monica Owusu-Breen
- Production code: 305
- Original air date: November 1, 2006
- Running time: 43 minutes

Guest appearances
- Michael Bowen as Danny Pickett; Adetokumboh M'Cormack as Yemi; Andrew Divoff as Mikhail Bakunin; Hakeem Kae-Kazim as Emeka; Muna Otaru as Amina; Aisha Hinds as Nun; Jermaine "Scooter" Smith as Daniel; Lawrence Jones as Soldier; Michael Robinson as Trader; Ariston Green as Jason; Kolawole Obileye Jr. as Young Eko; Olalekan Obileye as Young Yemi

Episode chronology
← Previous "Every Man for Himself"	Next → "I Do"
- Lost season 3

"The Cost of Living" is the 5th episode of the third season of Lost, and the 54th episode overall. It aired on November 1, 2006, in the US, averaging 16.07 million viewers, and on December 5, 2006, in the UK, being watched by 1.15 million viewers. The episode was written by Monica Owusu-Breen and Alison Schapker and directed by Jack Bender. The plot centers on the character of Mr. Eko (Adewale Akinnuoye-Agbaje), who in flashbacks shows how he became a priest replacing his dead brother Yemi (Adetokumboh M'Cormack), and in the present day events is haunted by visions of Yemi while other castaways decide to visit a Dharma Initiative station.

The episode was written to finish Eko's character arc as Akinnuoye-Agbaje had requested to leave the show while finishing the second season. Reviewers subsequently praised "The Cost of Living" while considering that the departure of Eko made Lost lose one of its best characters.

== Plot ==
=== Flashbacks ===
Shortly after the death of his brother Yemi, Eko is driven back to Yemi's village. Inside the church, Eko announces to the altar boy Daniel and his mother Amina that he will be taking his brother's place at the church. When Amina also inquires about Yemi's upcoming trip to London, a surprised Eko states that he would also replace him there.

Some time later, after Eko has become established in his new role as priest, he is confronted by militiamen, who Amina reveals that had a deal with Yemi to get most of the clinic's vaccines. Eko soon develops a plan to sell the vaccine on the black market before he leaves the country that coming weekend.

As the militiamen learn of Eko's deal, they attack him inside the church, but end up getting killed. The villagers respond by closing the church as they felt it was desecrated. Amina calls out Eko, saying she had been aware of the vaccine deal, and advises him to repent and make his peace with God, telling Eko that he "owes" Yemi one church (thus revealing why Eko built the church with Charlie.)

=== On the Island ===
A delirious Eko has a vision of his brother Yemi (Adetokumboh M'Cormack) holding a cigarette lighter, who says it was Eko's time to confess his sins and, he knew where to find him. Afterwards, Eko's shelter catches fire, and Eko is rescued by Charlie Pace (Dominic Monaghan) and Hugo "Hurley" Reyes (Jorge Garcia). As John Locke (Terry O'Quinn) arrives to ask what happened, Eko has vanished.

The next morning, Locke suggests to Desmond Hume (Henry Ian Cusick) that he visit the Pearl station. Joined by Charlie, Sayid Jarrah (Naveen Andrews), Nikki and Paulo (Kiele Sanchez and Rodrigo Santoro), the group finds Eko on their way to the Pearl. Upon arrival, Eko does not find Yemi's body on the airplane atop the entrance, and decides to remain outside while Locke and the others enter the hatch. Inside the Pearl, Sayid tinkers first with the communication lines and, following a suggestion from Nikki, the monitors. Then one of the screens gets a live video feed of what appears to be another hatch, revealing a man with an eyepatch (Andrew Divoff) who then turns off the camera.

Meanwhile, outside the Pearl, Eko sees Yemi and follows him into an open field, where Yemi tells him it is time for Eko to confess his sins. Eko says he has not sinned, having not chosen the life he was given and that Eko had only done what he needed to do to survive. An angry-looking Yemi replies, "You speak to me as if I were your brother" as he retreats into the jungle. Eko follows him asking "Who are you?!", and then finds the smoke monster. An arm of smoke attacks Eko, beating him into trees before he is slammed into the ground. Locke and the others rush out of the station to find a bloodied Eko. Locke approaches Eko, who whispers his dying words into Locke's ears. Sayid asks what he said, and Locke replies, "We're next."

=== On Hydra Island ===
At The Hydra, Jack is invited by Ben Linus (Michael Emerson) to attend a memorial service being held for Colleen. On the way, Jack asks about the symptoms of Ben's spinal tumor, particularly pointing out that it will kill him. Ben professes not to know what Jack is talking about. Privately, Ben asks Juliet Burke (Elizabeth Mitchell) why she showed his X-rays to Jack. Juliet replies that she never told Jack whose X-rays they were, and remarks that Ben must have inadvertently confirmed Jack's guess.

The following day, Ben tells Jack that they had a perfect plan to convince Jack to operate on Ben's spine, but it failed when Jack saw the X-rays. Afterwards, Juliet brings to Jack's cell a movie, which consists of Juliet speaking through cue cards. As Juliet discusses how the surgery will proceed, on the tape she tells Jack that Ben is a liar and very dangerous, and thus the surgery should be intentionally botched to kill Ben, and that she will protect Jack if he does so.

== Production ==
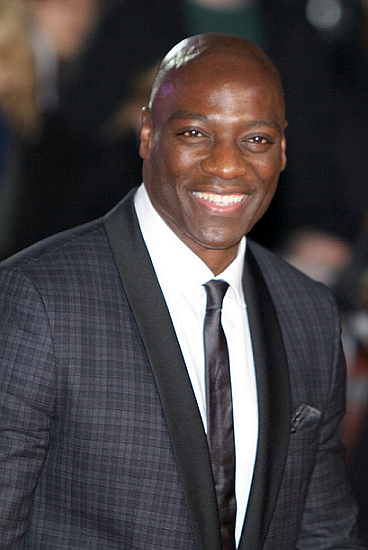
Adewale Akinnuoye-Agbaje and the producers agreed to finish Mr. Eko's character arc in early season 3.

Adewale Akinnuoye-Agbaje signed to Lost on a one-year contract, as he did not want to make a long-term commitment to the series. As Michelle Rodriguez signed under similar conditions that led to her character Ana-Lucia Cortez only appearing in the show's second season, show runners Damon Lindelof and Carlton Cuse negotiated with Akinnuoye-Agbaje to make his character, Mr. Eko, to appear in the third season as well, adding some space between the two character deaths to develop Eko's closure better. As filming of season 2 ended, conversations between the actor and the writers ended setting Eko's departure during the first six episodes, prior to mid-season break, with "a shocking and emotional death". To make sure the sequence was "big and impressive", effects supervisor Kevin Blank decided to set the death at the Jackass Ginger in Kalihi, a large space that allowed to make the Smoke Monster "flip him around in weird physical positions". A stunt double was dragged through cables, and along with the digital monster and wire removal, fast editing made the scene akin to "a magician's trick", in Blank's opinion. The episode was written by Monica Owusu-Breen and Alison Schapker, who had previously worked in another series by Lost production company Bad Robot Productions, Alias.

Cuse and Lindelof stated that Nikki and Paulo served as a red herring as rumors were raised of an incoming character death, and the fanbase would expect this to happen to the newcomers "who were sort of just there all along" instead of a prominent and popular character as Eko. Juliet's message to Jack is an homage to Bob Dylan's video for "Subterranean Homesick Blues", where the musician flips cue cards while looking at the camera.

== Reception ==
This episode attracted 16.07 million American viewers in its original broadcast on November 1, 2006, standing as the tenth most watched program of the week. In the United Kingdom, the episode had 1.247 million viewers, ranking third in multichannel shows after Ford Super Sunday and The Simpsons. In Canada, "The Cost of Living" had 1.15 million viewers, ranking as the 26th highest-rated program of the week.

Reviews were positive, though most critics found that the character of Eko was killed too soon in the show. Writing for Zap2it, Rick Porter said that while "The Cost of Living" was the best episode of season 3 thus far with "an illuminating flashback, some heavy island juju and a nice mix of the campers and the Others", the death of Eko removed from Lost "one of its most compelling characters and best actors, which just flat-out sucks." Kristin dos Santos of E! Online called Mr. Eko "the best character of the show", and was therefore very disappointed with his death. Christine Fenno of Entertainment Weekly stated that she would miss Adewale Akinnuoye-Agbaje, and found Juliet's message to be the best part of the episode, that like the rest of season three "answered a few questions (whose tumor?), raised a few questions (who's the eye-patch guy?), and ignored many long-standing questions (how did Yemi and Eko crash on the same island?)."

IGN's Chris Carabott ranked the episode 9.3 out of 10, saying it was "one of the series' best efforts" exploring the series' mythology and providing new paths, while also featuring Eko in "one of the most refreshing flashbacks that the series has produced thus far" and "a shocking confrontation" with the Smoke Monster. The reviewer still complained about Nikki and Paulo's participation, considering them "poorly developed" and giving "the sense that they are being shoehorned in". The website later ranked "The Cost of Living" as the 25th best episode of the series, saying that while early Season 3 "might have dragged a bit", "The Cost of Living" "saw the excitement and drama ramp up considerably. The only thing marring this otherwise excellent episode was the presence of Nikki and Paolo." On the other hand, a similar list by the Los Angeles Times ranked it 96th, considering that despite being "actually a pretty good piece of TV", the episode was "just marred by the fact that the show was forced into killing Mr. Eko, a character whose story was far from over."
