= Mr. Eko =

Fictional character of the TV series Lost

- Lost character
- Adewale Akinnuoye-Agbaje as Mr. Eko
- First appearance: "Adrift"
- Last appearance: "I Do"
- Created by: J. J. Abrams; Damon Lindelof
- Portrayed by: Adewale Akinnuoye-Agbaje
- Centric episode(s): "The 23rd Psalm" "?" "The Cost of Living"

In-universe information
- Full name: Mr. Eko (last name unknown)
- Gender: Male
- Occupation: Roman Catholic Priest; Former drug lord
- Relatives: Yemi (brother)
- Nationality: Nigerian
- Former residence: Nigeria

Mr. Eko is a fictional character played by Adewale Akinnuoye-Agbaje on the ABC television series Lost. He is introduced in the second season episode "Adrift" as one of the plane-crash survivors from the tail section. Flashbacks reveal that he became the leader of a gang of guerrillas to save his brother when he lived in Nigeria. He assumed his brother's identity and became a priest after his brother was killed in a failed drug smuggling operation; Eko was ostracized, and left Nigeria to become a priest in Australia. After investigating the alleged miracle of a girl who came back to life after drowning in Australia in 2004, Eko boarded Oceanic Airlines Flight 815. The plane crashed and left Eko, along with a few other survivors, on a deserted island.

Lost creators Damon Lindelof and Carlton Cuse were fans of Akinnuoye-Agbaje's work on HBO's Oz, and asked him to portray the character. Although Akinnuoye-Agbaje was not interested in joining the cast, he was persuaded by Cuse and Lindelof, but for a shorter period than they had in mind. Akinnuoye-Agbaje had a lot of influence on his character, changing the character's name and making adjustments to Eko's personality. After appearing on the show for one season, Akinnuoye-Agbaje asked Cuse and Lindelof to write his character out of the show because he did not feel at home in Hawaii. They decided a "shocking and emotional death" would be the best way for the character to depart: after seeing his brother on the island, Eko chases him until he stumbles upon the smoke monster, which brutally murders him.

Mr. Eko received many positive responses from critics and fans, who were disappointed that the character was killed after one season. A toy figure of Mr. Eko was included in a second series of Lost toy figures distributed by McFarlane Toys.

== Appearances ==
=== Prior to the crash ===
From Nigeria, Mr. Eko grew up always looking after his younger brother, Yemi (Adetokumboh M'Cormack), with whom he lived in a small village. As revealed in "The 23rd Psalm", one day, when Eko is playing with the local children, a gang of guerrillas raids the village in search of young recruits. When Yemi refuses to shoot an elderly man, Eko steps in and shoots him himself, sparing Yemi from the same fate. Impressed by his actions, the guerrillas take Eko away with them and draw him away from his religious lifestyle and into the criminal life, where Eko adopted the title "Mr." He grows up to be a fearless drug lord and a vicious leader of a guerrilla group, while his brother becomes an honoured priest. Years after his abduction, Eko returns to his home village to ask Yemi to help him smuggle heroin, which Eko has hidden in a large number of Virgin Mary statues and intends to fly out of the country. Yemi refuses until Eko threatens his associates will burn the church down if he does not sign documents that allow him and his henchmen to appear as priests.

As Eko and his men assemble at the airfield on the day the shipment is ready to be smuggled, it is revealed Yemi has tipped off the military and now tries to convince Eko not to go through with his plans. When the military arrives, Yemi is killed in the ensuing gun battle and Eko is kicked off the plane. After the plane leaves, Eko is mistaken for Yemi and released back to his village. Feeling guilty over Yemi's death, Eko assumes his role as the village priest. One day, Eko encounters a gang of guerrillas who made a deal with Yemi: they'll take 80% of the vaccines delivered to the village in exchange for the village's safety. Soon afterward, the guerrillas arrive at the church and attempt to cut off Eko's hands. However, Eko fights back and kills them, much to the shock of the village. The church is thus boarded up and Eko is ostracized until he leaves for London.

After leaving England, Eko assumes his brother's identity, serving as a priest in Australia under the name Father Tunde. A monsignor asks him to investigate a reported miracle of a young lady who has come back to life after drowning. The girl's father, Richard Malkin, dismisses the miracle as an act of incompetence by the undertaker, claiming the girl was suffering from severe hypothermia and the doctor misdiagnosed her as a result. Eko soon prepares to board Oceanic Airlines Flight 815; shortly after buying a ticket, he encounters the girl whom the investigation is about. She tells Eko she saw Yemi as she was "between places", and his brother had a message for him to have faith.

=== After the crash ===
After the crash, Eko lands with the tail-section survivors in the ocean, a short distance from the beach. On the group's first night on the island, the Others kidnap a few of the survivors. Eko kills two of them while resisting a kidnap attempt; feeling guilty, Eko remains mute for the following forty days. In "Adrift", Eko beats Jin-Soo Kwon (Daniel Dae Kim), James "Sawyer" Ford (Josh Holloway), and Michael Dawson (Harold Perrineau) unconscious when they arrive on their beach and hauls them into a pit. When their innocence is proven, Eko and the tail-section survivors head to the camp of the other fuselage survivors. After their arrival in "What Kate Did", John Locke (Terry O'Quinn) shows Eko an orientation video from the DHARMA Initiative. Eko watches it and fits in with the remaining fuselage survivors.

In "The 23rd Psalm", Eko discovers a Virgin Mary statue in Charlie Pace's (Dominic Monaghan) possession and he demands to be taken to the Beechcraft where it came from, knowing his brother's body is there. Eko and Charlie decide to burn the plane along with all the heroin-filled statues. On his fiftieth day on the island, Eko baptizes baby Aaron and his mother Claire Littleton (Emilie De Ravin). As he discovers the survivors hold one of the others named "Henry Gale" (Michael Emerson) captured in the Swan hatch, he requests to speak to him. Eko confesses to him about killing two people on the first night of the crash and expresses his condolences before leaving. Following his confession, Eko starts building a church down the beach with Charlie's help. However, after Ana Lucia Cortez (Michelle Rodriguez) and Yemi tell him to help Locke in a dream in "?", Eko abandons the church and ventures into the jungle with Locke, claiming to hunt down the escaped "Henry Gale". Eko manages to coax Locke into taking him to the "?" he drew on a map, resulting in the discovery of the Pearl station. After watching the station's orientation video, Eko vows to continue pushing the button in the hatch, despite Locke's protests. In the season 2 finale "Live Together, Die Alone", Locke and Desmond Hume (Henry Ian Cusick) initiate a lockdown and lock Eko out of the computer room. Desperate not to let the timer run out, Eko goes to the stash of dynamite from the Black Rock, a ship which wrecked on the island before the plane. Eko's attempt to blow open the blast door has no effect except to knock him unconscious, and he is thus unable to prevent the timer's reaching zero. As a result, the station implodes.

Although Eko survives the implosion, he is dragged away by a polar bear. Locke and Charlie later rescue him and pull him to safety. In "The Cost of Living", Eko awakens to find Yemi in his tent, telling him he needs to confess before finding his tent is on fire. Searching for Yemi, he soon decides to follow Locke, Desmond, Sayid Jarrah (Naveen Andrews), Nikki and Paulo (Kiele Sanchez, and Rodrigo Santoro) to the Pearl station. While waiting outside, he sees Yemi again, and follows the apparition to give his confession. Upon learning it is merely a deception, Eko grows angry and chases Yemi into the jungle, where he confronts the "Monster". After being thrown about by the Monster, Eko is finally thrown to the ground. Fatally wounded, he whispers "I saw the Devil" to Locke before dying, although Locke, for whatever reason, decides to tell Sayid he said, "We're next." As he dies, we see an image of Eko and Yemi as happy children, walking into the distance. In one of the flashforwards in the final episode of the fourth season, Hurley is seen sitting at a table with a chessboard on it across from a seemingly empty seat. Before he leaves, Hurley says: "Checkmate, Mr. Eko."

== Personality ==
When creating the character, the producers envisioned Mr. Eko as "the one character who comes to terms with living on the island, and not being consumed with trying to get off". Being introduced as a "tailie", a person on the tail section of the plane, Eko is a mysterious and complex character. MSNBC said the character is "always fighting a battle, an internal struggle as to whether the life he led was worthy of pride or shame". Portrayer Adewale Akinnuoye-Agbaje explained Mr. Eko's dedication to pushing the button in the hatch with seeing the hatch as the answer to the mystery of life. Described as a "natural leader", Mr. Eko is a "strong, silent type, a man of few words". Jon Bonné of MSNBC said, he is "a dude you don't mess with". When Akinnuoye-Agbaje was at a bank in Hawaii, a fan said his character was a criminal pretending to be a priest, to which Akinnuoye-Agbaje replied: "No, actually, I'm a priest pretending to be a criminal."

== Development ==
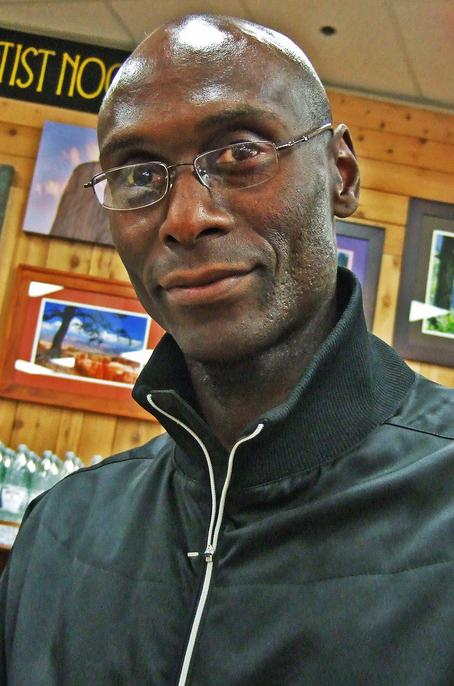
Lance Reddick was the producers' initial choice to play the character but was unavailable as he was filming The Wire.

What you see on the screen now is something quite different from what was originally talked about. As I understood it, from what we discussed with the creators, he was actually quite a passive character. The name that we initially came up with was 'Emeka', and I changed the name to 'Eko', because it is Yoruba, which is the tribe that I come from, and I added the 'Mr.'... I've had some difficulty trying to establish the character with the writers. Y'know, because we were trying to marry what they wanted to do with the show and feelings that I wanted to see come out in the character...'The 23rd Psalm', perhaps, was a bonding point for me as an actor with the writers, so it really was a formulation of a trust between us. Because when I saw that episode, I realized that I actually knew where I was coming from.

— Adewale Akinnuoye-Agbaje on the developments of Eko's character.

The character of Mr. Eko was created to explore the spiritual element of the show, and to add an African character, which the producers thought would provide "cultural variety" to the cast. Lost creators Damon Lindelof and Carlton Cuse's first choice for the actor to portray Eko was Lance Reddick, after they had seen him as Cedric Daniels on HBO's The Wire. However, after it was made clear Reddick was unavailable due to the filming schedule of The Wire, Cuse and Lindelof decided to contact Akinnuoye-Agbaje, because they were big fans of his work on the HBO prison drama Oz. At the time, Akinnuoye-Agbaje was filming Get Rich or Die Tryin' and, being unfamiliar with Lost, had no intention of joining the cast. While the producers succeeded in persuading Akinnuoye-Agbaje to take the role, he did not want to make a long-term commitment to the show and was therefore only hired for a short period of time. Akinnuoye-Agbaje accepted the part mostly because it was an opportunity to play a character with a different faith than his Buddhism, and because he enjoyed the idea of being on a deserted island (he had lived on a deserted island four years prior to being cast on the show). Two weeks after he was hired, Akinnuoye-Agbaje moved to Oahu, Hawaii, where filming took place.

While Mr. Eko was created as a more passive character, the idea changed when the producers first saw Akinnuoye-Agbaje play the character. Akinnuoye-Agbaje explained: "once they saw me on the screen without a shirt, all 6 foot 2 and using a stick beating three guys up, they knew this guy wasn't going to be just a passive priest". Eventually, Cuse and Lindelof decided to combine their original idea for the character with Akinnuoye-Agbaje's character on Oz. Originally, the character was named "Emeka", and later "Omecca", but after Akinnuoye-Agbaje was cast, the name was changed to "Eko", in order to be consistent with Akinnuoye-Agbaje's own Nigerian tribal lineage. Eko refers to the City of Legos (Lagos) in Nigeria, coming from Eleko, Lord of Lagos. Adding "Mr." in front of the character's name was also a suggestion made by Akinnuoye-Agbaje. While at first Cuse and Lindelof thought this was "the silliest thing in the world", they changed their minds after repeating the name a few times, realizing there "was something really cool about it". The character first appeared in "Adrift", where he was only shown briefly, knocking down three of the show's main characters with a stick. Akinnuoye-Agbaje was given the stick and told to "knock those three guys out". Akinnuoye-Agbaje felt "there's no better way to make an entrance". The religious scripture on the stick was a suggestion of Akinnuoye-Agbaje.

After he had been on the show for one season, Akinnuoye-Agbaje felt uncomfortable living in Hawaii and wanted to return to his residence in London, England. He discussed Mr. Eko's departure with Lindelof and Cuse, and the three decided the character would die somewhere in the first six episodes of the third season. They also found a "shocking and emotional death" would be the best way to write the character off the show. Akinnuoye-Agbaje felt Eko's death in "The Cost of Living" made the character "complete", commenting: "The Cost of Living" was "such a well-written episode that I knew I would be able to sew him up in a season", although Cuse later said he would have preferred the character to remain on the show a little longer. In 2008, Cuse and Lindelof made hints there were possibilities of the character's returning. However, despite Akinnuoye-Agbaje's wishes to return for the sixth season, the producers stated he would not be returning. The actor was eventually offered a guest role in the series finale, but turned it down due to salary disagreements.

== Reception ==
Overall, the character was positively received. The first week he was on the show, Akinnuoye-Agbaje received a lot of fanmail, much to his surprise. Craig Berman of MSNBC called Mr. Eko "one of the most creatively complex characters on the island". The Los Angeles Times depicted him as "the island's favorite 'tailie'". IGN named him the third best character from the first three seasons of Lost, behind Hurley and Locke. Akinnuoye-Agbaje's performance was praised by critics; Tim Goodman of the San Francisco Chronicle said he was "probably the best actor in the cast". In 2006, Akinnuoye-Agbaje shared the Screen Actors Guild Award for Outstanding Performance by an Ensemble in a Drama Series with the cast of Lost; they were also named "Entertainers of the Year" by Entertainment Weekly. He was also nominated for a Saturn Award for Best Supporting Actor on Television in 2005, but lost the award to Masi Oka of Heroes.

Generally, critics and fans were disappointed Mr. Eko was killed after being on the show for only one season. Kristin Dos Santos of E! called Mr. Eko "the best character of the show", and was therefore very disappointed with his death. In response to Mr. Eko's death, Christine Fenno of Entertainment Weekly stated "I'll miss Adewale Akinnuoye-Agbaje—his acting was up there with Terry O'Quinn's, Elizabeth Mitchell's, and Michael Emerson's. I guess he was the sacrifice the island demanded". Writing for Zap2it, Rick Porter said that his death "sucked hard, and loud, and long". IGN listed Eko's death as number one on its list of "Top 10 Lost Deaths".
