= The 23rd Psalm =

- Lost episode
- Episode no.: Season 2 Episode 10
- Directed by: Matt Earl Beesley
- Written by: Carlton Cuse; Damon Lindelof
- Production code: 210
- Original air date: January 11, 2006
- Running time: 43 minutes

Guest appearances
- Adetokumboh M'Cormack as Yemi; Kolawole Obileye Jr. as Young Eko; Olekan Obileye as Young Yemi; Pierre Olivier as Olu; Ronald Revels as Goldie; John Bryan as Thug captain; Lawrence Jones as Soldier; Moumen El Hajji as Moroccan; Achraf Marzouki as Moroccan; Ellis St. Rose as Priest; Cynthia Charles as Woman

Episode chronology
← Previous "What Kate Did"	Next → "The Hunting Party"
- Lost season 2

"The 23rd Psalm" is the tenth episode of the second season of Lost, and the 35th episode overall. The episode was directed by Matt Earl Beesley and written by Carlton Cuse and Damon Lindelof. It first aired on January 11, 2006, on ABC, and was watched by an average of 20.56 million American viewers. The episode is centered on the character of Mr. Eko (Adewale Akinnuoye-Agbaje), who in flashbacks is revealed to be a former warlord in Nigeria, and in the present-day events goes with Charlie Pace (Dominic Monaghan) to the Nigerian airplane which had crashed on the island.

The episode has an overall theme of redemption, and was written by drawing inspiration from "Deus Ex Machina", the episode where the Nigerian airplane was first introduced. Reviews for "The 23rd Psalm" were positive, praising the flashback and Akinnuoye-Agbaje's performance as Eko. The episode's script was later nominated for an Emmy Award.

== Plot ==
=== Flashbacks ===
Nigerian guerrillas arrive at a small village, grab a young boy named Yemi and try to force him to shoot an old man. The boy hesitates and his older brother, Eko, takes the gun and shoots the man himself, thus saving his brother from the act. The guerrillas are pleased with this, and force him to join their group, tearing his Christian cross from his neck, which is then taken by Yemi.

Years later, Eko has become a powerful warlord. He meets with a drug dealer who is trying to get his heroin out of the country. Eko offers to do him a "favor," buying the drugs at a low price and spiriting them out of the country. The drug runner agrees, but is killed after saying that he believed Eko had no soul. Later, Eko visits the church of his hometown, where Yemi has become a priest. Eko asks him for a plane, because only United Nations relief and missionary aircraft are allowed to fly out of Nigeria, saying he will fly the drugs away from the Nigerians and give his brother money for a polio vaccine. Yemi refuses to help. Later, Eko approaches his brother again, asking simply for Yemi to sign ordination papers that make Eko and two associates priests so that they can arrange the flight themselves. His brother refuses, but reluctantly signs after Eko says that his two friends will burn the church to the ground if Yemi does not collaborate. Eko also buys Virgin Mary statues to hide the heroin within.

Dressed as priests, Eko and two associates are loading drugs onto a Beechcraft airplane, when Yemi drives up and tells him not to leave. The Nigerian military arrives shortly thereafter, killing a henchman and shooting Yemi. Eko loads his brother onto the plane, but the pilot, who has a gold tooth, prevents Eko from boarding and flies away. Then the military approach and, mistaking Eko for a real priest, ask Eko, "Are you alright, Father?"

=== On the Island ===
On the island, Claire Littleton (Emilie de Ravin) watches Eko whittling scripture into the head of his club, and mentions that Charlie Pace (Dominic Monaghan) carries a Virgin Mary statue. Eko immediately demands to see the statue, which he breaks open and shows Claire the heroin inside. Eko then goes to Charlie, demanding him to take him to the plane.

Meanwhile, Locke teaches Michael Dawson (Harold Perrineau) how to use a gun, and Michael then asks Kate Austen (Evangeline Lilly) to have her shift at the hatch computer. At the computer, Michael continues his conversation with his son Walt (Malcolm David Kelley), which is interrupted by the arrival of Jack Shephard (Matthew Fox), who remains unaware of it.

On the way to the Beechcraft, Eko and Charlie find a parachute in a tree, which leads to the corpse of a Nigerian man dressed as a priest that Boone Carlyle (Ian Somerhalder) and John Locke (Terry O'Quinn) had previously found. When Eko sees the dead man's gold tooth, he tells Charlie that the man "saved his life." Charlie loses his way, and Mr. Eko tells him to climb a tree. As he is above the tree, trees are uprooted as a cloud of free-moving black smoke emerges from the jungle. It confronts Mr. Eko whilst flashing images to him of his past. Mr. Eko stands his ground, despite Charlie telling him to run, and stares at the smoke before it pulls back and disappears. (This scene is significant because it marks the first appearance of the smoke monster in the second season, and it is the first time a clear shot of it is given; apart from very brief glimpses in the season one finale, the monster went unseen throughout the entire first season.)

Eko and Charlie then find the plane and inside it Eko finds another corpse which Eko recognizes as Yemi. After taking the cross from Yemi's body, Eko tells Charlie that it is his brother, gives Charlie a Virgin Mary statue "for the one [he] broke" and sets the plane on fire. Charlie asks Eko if he is a priest himself, and as Eko puts the cross around his neck he replies "Yes, I am." The two then recite Psalm 23 from the Old Testament as the plane burns.

After arriving at the camp, Charlie apologizes to Claire, but Claire tells him to leave her and her son alone. Charlie then goes into the jungle and opens a hiding place where he is keeping Virgin Mary statues to put the one Eko gave him.

== Production ==
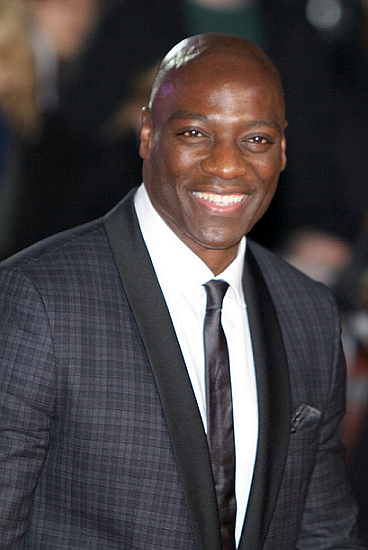
Adewale Akinnuoye-Agbaje plays Mr. Eko, the central character of this episode.

During the production of "Deus Ex Machina", which introduced the Nigerian airplane, a corpse dressed as a priest with a gun, and Virgin Mary statues filled with heroin, the Lost writers decided that the story of the Beechcraft would coincide with one of the characters' flashbacks. They decided to use one of the tail section characters to be introduced in season 2, "essentially a bad guy who was forced to disguise himself as a priest, and how would that come about, and could he now be presenting himself as a priest". Since Eko and Locke are both spiritual leaders on the island - but with Locke having a "paganistic, ritualistic appreciation" for the island's powers and Eko, "pure religious faith" - writers Carlton Cuse and Damon Lindelof decided to write in this episode parallels with "Deus Ex Machina", where Locke and Boone find the Beechcraft. The biggest similarity is Charlie unwillingly become Eko's "acolyte", just like Boone was being Locke's follower in their expedition to the airplane.

The main theme of "The 23rd Psalm" was redemption, which both Eko and Charlie are seeking, with Eko eventually getting his upon finding his brother. Charlie was chosen to be Eko's companion because the character did not have much screentime up to that point in the season, and the writers found similarities between Charlie and Eko, such as both having difficult relationships with their brothers. The writers accidentally transcribed Psalm 23 wrong, with "the shadow of the valley of death" instead of "the valley of the shadow of death," but decided to keep the mistake, feeling it was appropriate as Eko was never a proper priest.

The flashbacks had the intent of showing that Eko was the opposite of his religious brother, but eventually ended up similar to Yemi. Nigeria's depiction was described by art director Bill Matthews as a "very dusty-dirty brown kind of Nigerian-earth look", with touches such as vendors on the street, and a square where children play soccer. The interior of the church was an actual location in Haleiwa, and a facade was built on the set to match it. While editing, the producers decided to separate a part of the final scene involving the airplane getting attacked and taking off, where a soldier confuses Eko for a priest, to juxtapose with Eko's spiritual epiphany on the island and set up his next flashback on "?", where he is a priest in Australia. As the casting team was having trouble finding a Moroccan to play the drug dealer, set caterer Moumen El Hajji was selected for the role.

As the Monster had not yet appeared in the second season, the producers decided to expand on his mythology in "The 23rd Psalm", as they thought Eko was a good character to confront the Monster because of his spirituality and "self-awareness". Visual effects supervisor Kevin Blank suggested on adding imagery representing Eko's past on the smoke, such as a cross and the man he shoots at the opening scene.

== Reception ==
The original broadcast of "The 23rd Psalm" was on January 11, 2006 on ABC, being preceded by a clip show titled "Lost: Revelations". It was watched by approximately 20.56 million American viewers, being third in the weekly audience ranking, behind the AFC playoffs and Desperate Housewives.

Reviews for "The 23rd Psalm" were mostly positive. Entertainment Weekly's Jeff Jensen gave the episode an A, describing it as a "wonderfully strange parable about redemption and fate". Mac Slocum of Filmfodder.com considered the episode a worthy return after the two-month break, saying that Eko's "simple looks and simple phrases pummel the screen with gravitas and charisma". Ryan Mcgee of Zap2it considered highlights of the episode the scene with the Monster, and the flashback, which in his opinion "[did] so great a job at explaining an entire character so succinctly". IGN's Chris Carabott gave the episode an 8.3 out of 10, praising the development of Eko's character and the flashback.

Writers Carlton Cuse and Damon Lindelof's script for "The 23rd Psalm" was nominated for a Primetime Emmy Award for Outstanding Writing for a Drama Series. IGN ranked "The 23rd Psalm" 40th out of the 115 Lost episodes, calling the flashback "one of most action-packed and ambitious on the series". A similar list by Los Angeles Times ranked the episode at 49th, describing it as "a great first chapter that sadly never got a worthy follow-up."
