= I Do (Lost) =

- Lost episode
- Kate and Sawyer kiss in their cage.
- Episode no.: Season 3 Episode 6
- Directed by: Tucker Gates
- Written by: Damon Lindelof; Carlton Cuse
- Production code: 306
- Original air date: November 8, 2006
- Running time: 43 minutes

Guest appearances
- Nathan Fillion as Kevin Callis; Michael Bowen as Danny Pickett; M. C. Gainey as Tom Friendly; Tania Raymonde as Alex; Fredric Lane as Marshal Edward Mars; Ariston Green as Jason; Eden-Lee Murray as Suzanne Callis; Mark Dillen Stitham as Minister; Michael Vendrell as Guy; Teddy Wells as Ivan

Episode chronology
| ← Previous "The Cost of Living" | Next → "Not in Portland" |
- Lost season 3

"I Do" is the sixth episode of the third season of Lost, and the 55th episode overall. It aired on November 8, 2006, on ABC. The episode was written by Damon Lindelof and Carlton Cuse and directed by Tucker Gates. The character of Kate Austen (Evangeline Lilly) is featured in the episode's flashbacks, where her brief marriage to a police officer, Kevin Callis (Nathan Fillion), is shown. In the present events, Jack Shephard (Matthew Fox) considers whether or not to perform surgery on Ben Linus (Michael Emerson), and is motivated by Kate's claims that if he does not comply, Sawyer (Josh Holloway) will be killed.

This was the last episode to air before a 13-week hiatus, so it was written so that it would fit as a "mini-season finale", and also had a major theme in the contrast between Kate's relationships with Kevin and Sawyer. "I Do" gained mostly positive reviews, with much praise for the cliffhanger ending, and had 17.15 million American viewers upon release.

== Plot ==
=== Flashbacks ===
While on the run from the law, Kate goes to Miami, where under the name "Monica" she meets and marries a police officer, Kevin Callis (Nathan Fillion), even getting from his mother, Suzanne, a gold locket that had been passed down on the female side of the family (Suzanne never had any daughters). A while after the ceremony, Kate calls U.S. Marshal Edward Mars (Fredric Lane), saying she does not want to run anymore and pleads for him to stop chasing her. Mars guesses that Kate has gotten involved with a man, and tells her that if Kate can really settle down, he will stop chasing her, but that they both know it is unlikely that Kate will ever stop running. Later, Kate shows signs of relief after getting a negative pregnancy test, and decides to reveal the truth about her life to her husband. She drugs Kevin, places her mother-in-law's locket in his hands, and leaves.

=== In the Jungle ===
In the jungle, John Locke (Terry O'Quinn) tells Nikki Fernandez (Kiele Sanchez), Paulo (Rodrigo Santoro), Sayid Jarrah (Naveen Andrews), and Desmond Hume (Henry Ian Cusick) that Mr. Eko (Adewale Akinnuoye-Agbaje) was killed by an animal, and decides to bury Eko where he died, thinking the other castaways have seen "too many funerals" recently. As Locke leaves to get shovels as well as Eko's stick (he believes it'd be inappropriate to bury him without it), Sayid follows him and asks what really killed Eko. Locke says that the survivors call it "The Monster", and further speculates that The Monster may be what brought them there and that Eko died for a reason, he just does not know what it is yet. During the burial, Locke sees a message on Eko's stick: "Lift up your eyes and look north, John 3:05".

=== On the Island ===
On Hydra Island, Jack Shephard (Matthew Fox) says that Ben Linus's (Michael Emerson) tumor will become inoperable in a week, but adds he is not going to operate on Ben because he does not trust the Others' promise of freeing him, Kate and Sawyer (Josh Holloway). Trying to convince him otherwise, Juliet Burke (Elizabeth Mitchell) brings Kate to talk to Jack, telling her that it is the only way to prevent Danny Pickett (Michael Bowen) from killing Sawyer. When Kate tells him this, Jack gets angry and refuses.

After Kate returns to her cage, she has an argument with Sawyer, climbs out of her cage, and breaks open Sawyer's, saying if he does not want Jack to save his life, he is going to save his own. Sawyer then tells her that they cannot run because they are on another island, something he did not tell her "because I wanted you to believe that we had a damn chance." Kate and Sawyer then have sex, unknowingly in full view of the cameras. At the Hydra station, Jack finds his door unlocked and unguarded, and outside reaches a surveillance room, where he sees Kate and Sawyer cuddling together on a monitor. Ben appears behind him, and after a brief exchange Jack decides to do the surgery, but wants Ben to keep his promise to let Jack off the island. Ben agrees when he says "done".

As Jack begins the operation, Pickett goes with another man to Sawyer's cage, ready to execute Sawyer as he holds Sawyer's group of survivors responsible for his wife Colleen's death (Colleen was shot by Sun earlier). Sawyer surrenders once Kate is held at gunpoint, but before Pickett can shoot Sawyer, he gets a call from Tom (M. C. Gainey). Jack has sabotaged the operation by cutting Ben's kidney sack; Jack states that if he does not sew up his incision within an hour, Ben will die. Holding Ben hostage, Jack demands to speak with Kate. Pickett holds off on executing Sawyer and gives Kate the walkie-talkie; Jack tells her to run, directing her to call him on the radio when she is safe, but Kate doesn't want to leave without him.

== Production ==
"It's actually more difficult for her to stay in that house and cook breakfast and be a little housewife, than it is for her to break rocks and work in a quarry and sleep in a cage."

— Evangeline Lilly

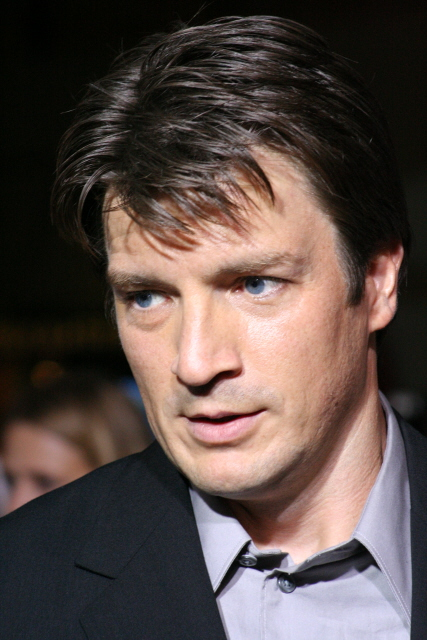
Nathan Fillion played Kevin Callis.

Show runners Damon Lindelof and Carlton Cuse wrote "I Do" as a "mini-season finale", as it was the last episode before mid-season hiatus, and would end in a cliffhanger. It also served as a climax and beginning of a closure of Jack, Kate, and Sawyer's captivity on Hydra Island, with the writers saying that afterwards there would be a return to the beach and the six-episode block would be "more palatable" and make more sense, comparing them to the first seven episodes of season 2 where the tail section survivors are introduced. Executive producer Bryan Burk also said the pre-hiatus episodes were "our season 2.5. Like, this is kind of like wrapping up a lot of where we were last year", considering season three would really begin in the seventh episode.

A main theme of the episode is Kate's inability to commit to other people, always running from difficult emotional situations, and having barriers between her and her interests – physical, as in Sawyer's cage or Jack's aquarium, or metaphorical, as in her inability to settle down as Kevin's wife. Kate's marriage, which was first alluded to in the season one episode "Outlaws", is meant to be a contrast with her relationship with Sawyer in the realtime events – Kate and Kevin is a heartfelt and passionate relationship where Kate tries to get involved but her lifestyle ends up making the marriage fail, whereas with Sawyer both are afraid of intimacy and connection yet still end up together.

Nathan Fillion was cast as Kevin because the producers thought he fit as "someone to believe that Kate had actually married and settled down with" for being "really good and kinda fun and intelligent", and also because Cuse and Lindelof were fans of Fillion's work on Firefly. Fillion said that he was a Lost fan and described his experience working at the show as "a dream".

== Reception ==
=== Ratings ===
17.15 million American viewers watched this episode live, standing as the ninth most-seen program of the week. It also had 1.1 million viewers in the United Kingdom.

=== Critical reception ===
Chris Carabott of IGN gave a 9.3 out of 10 to "I Do". He felt it ended with a great cliffhanger. Carabott complimented Locke's scenes as "short but nonetheless powerful" and praised Matthew Fox's acting, saying he "steals the show with one of his best performances to date". Writing for Entertainment Weekly, Christine Fenno thought that the flashbacks were "full of fun details", although the events on the island were more exciting. Jonathan Toomey of AOL's TV Squad and BuddyTV's Oscar Dahl thought it was a worthy mid-season finale. Toomey liked that the romantic scenes between Kate and Sawyer created great tension and Dahl had a good reaction to the cliffhanger which "set up incredible possibilities for the rest of the season". Not all reviews were positive, with Slant Magazine's critic Andrew Dignan feeling it was "lacking both the immediacy and urgency that keeps viewers clamoring for months on end", and being critical of the writing, particularly on most of the essential plot elements occurring in the final minutes.

"I Do" was selected as one of the "25 Sexiest TV Shows on DVD" by Entertainment Weekly. IGN ranked the episode 28th out of the 115 Lost episodes, describing it as a "turning point episode of the third season." On the other hand, a similar list by Los Angeles Times ranked "I Do" as the 91st, saying it "mostly botched" the plot point of Kate's wedding despite Nathan Fillion's presence, and feeling it was an episode that "probably shouldn't have had to have as much pressure on it as it did (acting as a mini-cliffhanger in early Season 3)".

Evangeline Lilly submitted this episode for consideration for Outstanding Lead Actress in a Drama Series for the 59th Primetime Emmy Awards.
