= Exposé (Lost) =

- Lost episode
- Episode no.: Season 3 Episode 14
- Directed by: Stephen Williams
- Written by: Edward Kitsis; Adam Horowitz
- Production code: 314
- Original air date: March 28, 2007
- Running time: 43 minutes

Guest appearances
- Maggie Grace as Shannon Rutherford; Ian Somerhalder as Boone Carlyle; Billy Dee Williams as himself; William Mapother as Ethan Rom; Daniel Roebuck as Dr. Leslie Arzt; Jacob Witkin as Howard Zuckerman

Episode chronology
← Previous "The Man from Tallahassee"	Next → "Left Behind"
- Lost season 3

"Exposé" is the 14th episode of the 3rd season and 63rd episode overall of the American Broadcasting Company (ABC)'s serial drama television series Lost. It aired on ABC in the United States and on CTV in Canada on March 28, 2007. The episode was written by Edward Kitsis and Adam Horowitz and directed by Stephen Williams.

The episode's story focuses on couple Nikki Fernandez (Kiele Sanchez) and Paulo (Rodrigo Santoro). The flashbacks reveal their lives before arriving on the island, and what they have been doing between day one and day eighty-one. Boone Carlyle (Ian Somerhalder) returned for the fifth time since his death late in the first season. Furthermore, Ethan (William Mapother) and Dr. Arzt (Daniel Roebuck) reprised their guest roles in flashbacks. The episode got a mixed response from critics and fans, with positive reception considering it an entertaining send-off to two unpopular characters, but negative reviews deemed it unnecessary. Retrospective reviews have been more positive especially for the ending.

== Plot ==
=== Flashbacks ===
The flashbacks begin with Nikki Fernandez (Kiele Sanchez) acting in a popular, Charlie's Angels-like TV show Exposé filmed in Sydney, in which she is a guest star. She is also having an affair with the septuagenarian executive producer, Howard L. Zuckerman, who is very wealthy, while Paulo (Rodrigo Santoro) works as his chef. Paulo kills Zuckerman by poisoning his food, and the couple steals his diamonds, which are worth $8 million. The couple plan on returning to the United States on Oceanic Flight 815, encountering Boone Carlyle (Ian Somerhalder) and Shannon Rutherford (Maggie Grace) at the airport. Upon surviving the plane crash, Nikki and Paulo realize that they have lost the bag with the diamonds. Nikki consults Dr. Leslie Arzt (Daniel Roebuck), who tells her of a spider with the ability to paralyze people. He also gives her a trajectory map which leads them to The Pearl and the Nigerian plane; they explore neither. When Kate Austen (Evangeline Lilly) mentions that she found luggage from the plane in a lake, Paulo finds the diamonds, but does not tell Nikki. Instead, he hides them in the toilet at The Pearl and overhears a conversation between Juliet Burke (Elizabeth Mitchell) and Ben Linus (Michael Emerson). The two accidentally leave behind a walkie-talkie that Paulo takes. Later, when Sayid Jarrah (Naveen Andrews), John Locke (Terry O'Quinn), Desmond Hume (Henry Ian Cusick), Nikki and Paulo visit The Pearl, Paulo retrieves the diamonds by pretending to use the bathroom. Nikki figures out that Paulo has found the diamonds without telling her and decides to lure him into a trap. When he denies that he has the diamonds, she unleashes one of the paralyzing spiders on him. She finds the diamonds and Paulo apologizes, claiming that he did it so that she would not end their relationship. Nikki hears The Monster's chittering sounds which distract her long enough for the pheromones of the female spider to attract a group of the male spiders of the same species and she is bitten on her leg. She buries the diamonds and sprints to the beach.

=== On the beach ===
Nikki then runs onto the beach, before collapsing where Hugo "Hurley" Reyes (Jorge Garcia) and James "Sawyer" Ford (Josh Holloway) are playing ping pong. As Hurley and Sawyer rush to her, she says something barely audible. She is soon pronounced dead. Hurley and Sawyer try to recount what Nikki said before she died and come to the conclusion that she said, "Paulo lies", although she actually said "paralyzed". Sawyer and Hurley begin an investigation and find Paulo lying lifeless in the jungle. Sawyer finds a walkie talkie in Nikki and Paulo's tent, and concludes they were working with the Others, due to the similarity. Hurley does not think the Others are near their camp, but Sun-Hwa Kwon (Yunjin Kim) reminds them that she was abducted nearby (unaware that it was Charlie who grabbed her). Sawyer tries to calm them down and says he will do a perimeter sweep. Meanwhile, Charlie Pace (Dominic Monaghan), who feels guilty, confesses to Sun that it was he who attempted to kidnap her. She says nothing and walks away. Sawyer returns, having found the diamonds, and the other survivors accuse him of being the killer because Desmond saw him arguing with Nikki just that morning. He gives the diamonds to Sun, but she later confronts him about kidnapping her and returns the diamonds because "they're worthless here." The survivors then hold a funeral for Nikki and Paulo, where Sawyer pours the pouch of diamonds into the grave. Nikki's eyelids open just as Hurley and Sawyer are filling the grave, burying her and Paulo alive.

== Production ==
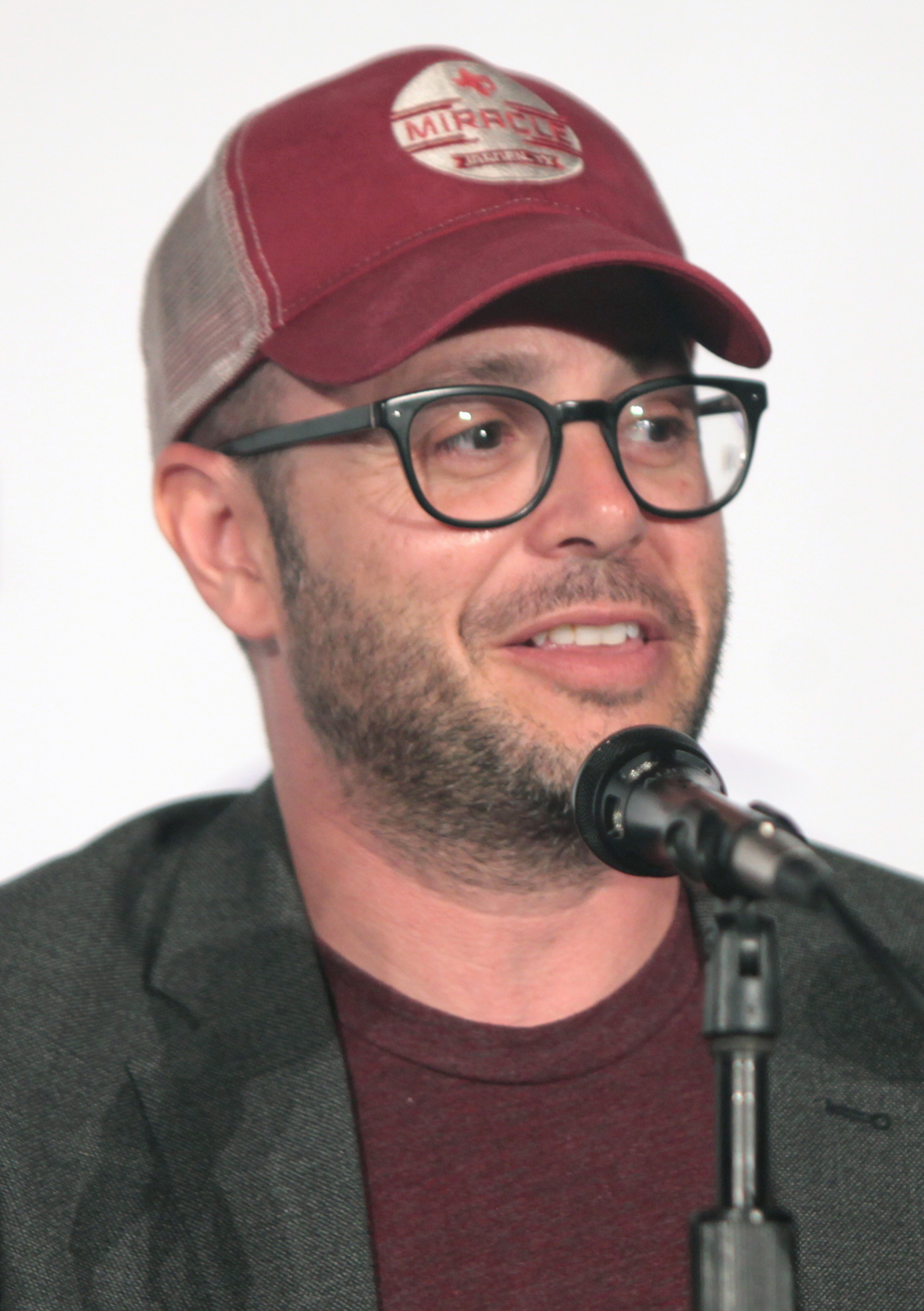
Damon Lindelof admitted that Nikki and Paulo were killed off due to being unpopular.

"Exposé" was the fourteenth episode of the series directed by Stephen Williams, and the ninth written by the screenwriting duo Edward Kitsis and Adam Horowitz. Kitsis and Horowitz intended to make the episode an homage to film noir, with two con artists who did the "perfect crime", that eventually goes wrong due to them getting stranded on the island. A reference to the genre was added by having Sawyer read Agatha Christie's Evil Under the Sun. A recurring theme is Nikki and Paulo's selfishness, which eventually leads to their deaths due to them being greedy and "too focused on their own petty needs to really care about anyone else".

The flashbacks of "Exposé" would show how Nikki and Paulo were always on the island by making them appear in important previous events. The scene set after the crash mixes actual scenes and unused footage of the pilot episode, along with new footage shot in the original location of Mokulēʻia beach. Since not all pieces of the wreckage were found, a few were added with greenscreen effects. The scene with Jack's speech intersperses new scenes with footage from "White Rabbit". Other continuity nods were considered, such as Paulo finding Shannon's inhaler from "Confidence Man", Nikki seeing Boone and Locke carrying shovels to excavate the hatch, and a filmed, but deleted scene where Nikki sees the sky turning purple.

During season one, the writers had the idea of introducing a character who was an actress and also created the outline of the fictional show where she would work, Exposé. The "long, daunting hours" on the writer's room would sometimes lead to creating episodes of the fictional show, with ten being done when the Nikki-centered episode was written. Originally, there was going to be an entire flashback episode in which Nikki was going to be a crime-fighting stripper, only to have it revealed that she was actually an actress. The idea was shortened to just one flashback spot. The role of Mr. LaShade was written with Billy Dee Williams in mind and, when he was cast, the color scheme of LaShade's hat was chosen in reference to his costume worn in his famed role as Lando Calrissian.

Nikki and Paulo were killed off due to being disliked by much of Lost's fan base. Show runner Damon Lindelof admitted that the couple were "universally despised" by fans. Lindelof explained that "back when we (the producers) had more good faith with the audience, we could have gotten away with these shenanigans. Given the backlash against them, we had to clean up the mess." The decision to kill them off in one flashback episode was decided by the producers in December 2006. It was also stated by Lindelof and fellow show runners Carlton Cuse that despite Nikki and Paulo's bad reception, they felt the episode was necessary to explain their original plan of introducing former background characters to the main cast. Lindelof suggested having the characters be buried alive. Although actress Kiele Sanchez said that she was not bothered by the general dislike of her character, she was very nervous during the burial scene, because she has claustrophobia. Speculation about the duo's deaths began months before the actual episode aired. Santoro said in an interview with Brazilian Rolling Stone that his character was going to die in the middle of the third season. Another clue about the deaths came when it was announced that Sanchez was signed on to film a fall 2007 pilot for the ABC show, Football Wives.

Later Sanchez said she was “happy“ with the episode:

“I thought that it was really awesome, and I felt lucky. It was a good death. And I love that it was done by the heroes of the show. They're burying two people who are actually alive.“

== Reception ==
"Exposé" had 11.25 million viewers upon its first US broadcast, being ABC's third most watched show of the week – behind the performance show and results of Dancing with the Stars – and placing Lost at the eighteenth spot on the overall weekly ranking. It also attracted 1.089 million viewers in Canada, being the fourth most watched show of the night, and 961,000 viewers in the United Kingdom, being Sky One's most watched show of the week.

"Exposé" received mixed reviews. Lindelof admitted that the episode "created a varying degree of fan reaction", with some fans even describing it as "filler". But Cuse defended "Exposé", saying it was "a little bit more of an anthology episode for the show", and that he felt that "it's unrealistic, in a show that is now 72 episodes in, that every episode is gonna be, you know, chock full of plot momentum. I think it's entirely reasonable, and we sort of by necessity have to have episodes that aren't super-narratively, you know, propelled." Daniel of TMZ.com said that the episode "was a complete waste of time", and that although he "wanted Nikki and Paulo to die", he did not think their deaths warranted an entire episode. Entertainment Weekly's Jeff Jensen wrote that although he liked the cameo appearance of Billy Dee Williams, he did not think "Exposé" "will do much to change anyone's minds" about Nikki and Paulo, who were already unpopular characters. Brooke Tarnoff, a writer for UGO.com, wrote that she was "embarrassed" for Lost. New York Magazine put "Exposé" at the top of its list of "Twenty Most Pointless Lost Episodes". However, TV Guide's Matt Roush very much praised the episode for "weaving flashbacks that appeared to be posthumous but really weren't while providing clever new angles on classic Lost moments from previous seasons", Roush went on to say that "Exposé" was "a welcome reminder that sometimes these producers really do seem to know what they're doing after all." Chris Carabott of IGN also gave a positive review, stating that while Nikki and Paulo had no real impact on the overall storyline, "their ultimate end made for an entertaining hour of television". The IGN staff later ranked "Exposé" 58th out of the 113 Lost episodes, describing it as "one of the series' darkest and most fun episodes".
