= What Kate Did =

- Lost episode
- Episode no.: Season 2 Episode 9
- Directed by: Paul Edwards
- Written by: Steven Maeda; Craig Wright
- Production code: 209
- Original air date: November 30, 2005
- Running time: 46 minutes

Guest appearances
- L. Scott Caldwell as Rose Nadler; Sam Anderson as Bernard Nadler; Fredric Lehne as Marshal Edward Mars; Beth Broderick as Diane Janssen; Lindsey Ginter as Sam Austen; James Horan as Wayne Janssen; J. Edward Sclafani as Ticket agent; François Chau as Dr. Marvin Candle

Episode chronology
← Previous "Collision"	Next → "The 23rd Psalm"
- Lost season 2

"What Kate Did" is the 34th episode of Lost. It is the ninth episode of the second season. The episode was directed by Paul Edwards, and written by Steven Maeda and Craig Wright. It first aired on November 30, 2005, on ABC. The character of Kate Austen (Evangeline Lilly) is featured in the episode's flashbacks.

== Plot ==
=== Flashbacks ===
Kate Austen kills her alcoholic stepfather, Wayne Jansen, by blowing up his house. Kate confronts her mother, Diane Austen. Kate reveals that she took out an insurance policy under Diane's name. Later, Kate attempts to buy a ticket to Tallahassee, when she is arrested by United States Marshal Edward Mars, revealing that her mother had turned her in. On a country highway during a rainy night, Mars is driving a handcuffed Kate to her arraignment in Iowa. Suddenly, a black horse passes in front of the car, causing Mars to crash the car. With Mars momentarily stunned by the opening of the driver's airbag, Kate grabs the handcuff keys and escapes. Kate then visits a U.S. Army recruiting station and meets her father, Sergeant Major Sam Austen. As Kate approaches his desk, Sayid's arrest in the airport is shown on a television in the background. Kate tells Sam that she recently discovered that Wayne was her biological father. Sam reveals that he had known this all along but had hidden the truth because he feared Kate would kill Wayne if she ever found out. He informs Kate that he must call the authorities but agrees to give her a one-hour head start.

=== On the island ===
In the Swan Station, Jack watches over Sawyer. Meanwhile, Kate is collecting fruit in the jungle. She is shocked to see a black horse standing in the undergrowth. She returns to the hatch to attend to Sawyer and the computer so that Jack can attend Shannon's funeral. At the funeral, Sayid tries to say a few words, but can only declare that he loved her before walking away. At the hatch, Kate tells an unconscious Sawyer that she saw a horse outside. Suddenly, Sawyer grabs her by the neck and says, "You killed me. Why did you kill me?" Jack and Locke later return to the hatch to find the alarm blaring, Sawyer on the floor, and Kate nowhere to be seen.

In Swan Station, Michael asks Locke about the blast door in the ceiling, which Locke admits he had not noticed. Jack tracks Kate down and accosts her for leaving Swan Station. In the ensuing confrontation, Kate suddenly kisses Jack, however, she immediately runs away.

Locke shows the DHARMA Initiative "Orientation" film of Swan Station to Michael and Eko and then explains that he has set up two-person shifts every six hours to enter the code. Sayid discovers Kate sitting at Shannon's grave. She apologizes for missing the funeral and confesses that she thinks she is going crazy, to which Sayid replies that he saw Walt in the jungle just before Shannon was shot and asks if that makes him crazy too.

At Swan Station, Michael asks to inspect the equipment, and Locke agrees. Later, Eko calls Locke aside and, after leading in with a story about Josiah and the book found during Josiah's rule, reveals a hollowed-out Bible which contains a small reel of film, which was found by the tail-section survivors in the DHARMA Arrow Station. Locke unrolls part of the reel and recognizes Dr. Marvin Candle.

Back in the hatch, Kate, believing that Wayne's ghost has somehow possessed Sawyer's body, confesses aloud that she killed him after finding out that he was her biological father. It was too much to bear for her to know that the man who she hated would always be a 'part of her'. Following Kate's confession, Sawyer awakes as his normal self, and his comments reveal he has heard the whole conversation. She shows Sawyer around the hatch before taking him outside. As the two talk, the black horse reappears. Sawyer reveals he can see the horse as well. Kate approaches and pets it, and after a moment, the horse walks back into the jungle.

Eko and Locke splice the film from the book back into the main film reel. They watch the missing section of the film, in which Dr. Candle expands on his warning that the computer is to be used only to enter the code. He explains that while the isolation of the SWAN may tempt one to use the computer to communicate with the outside world, such action could lead to another "incident." While examining the computer equipment Michael hears a strange beeping from the computer. The phrase 'Hello?' appears, the computer seems to be receiving messages. When asked what his name is, Michael types his name on the screen, and there is a delayed response. The computer then responds 'Dad?'

== Development ==
Hurley comments that he did not expect Rose's husband to be white, before Jack quickly changes the subject. The producers felt it was important to address that they are an interracial couple, and that Hurley was saying what the audience would be thinking. Caldwell agreed with them and thought it would be odd if the issue was not addressed. Anderson also was glad that Hurley brought up the issue, and liked that Jack did not pay any attention.

== Reception ==
The episode gained 21.54 million American viewers in its first airing.
