= Nikki and Paulo =

Lost characters

- Lost characters
- Nikki and Paulo on Day 72
- First appearance: "Further Instructions"
- Last appearance: "Exposé"
- Portrayed by: Kiele Sanchez; Rodrigo Santoro
- Centric episode(s): "Exposé"

In-universe information
- Full name: Nikki Fernandez & Paulo (surname unknown)
- Gender: Female (Nikki); Male (Paulo)
- Occupation: Con artists / actress and Chef
- Former residence: Los Angeles and Brazil

Nikki Fernandez and Paulo (/ˈpaʊloʊ/ POW-loh) are fictional characters on the ABC drama television series Lost, which chronicles the adventures of over forty people after their plane crashes on a remote island somewhere in the South Pacific. American actress Kiele Sanchez and Brazilian actor Rodrigo Santoro play two survivors of the crash of Oceanic Flight 815.

The couple is introduced early in the third season. The producers of the show were often asked what the rest of the plane-crash survivors were doing because the show only focuses on approximately fifteen of the survivors, and the characters of Nikki and Paulo were created in response. Reaction to the characters was generally negative, with showrunner Damon Lindelof acknowledging the couple were "universally despised" by fans. As a result of this, the couple was killed off later in the same season when they are accidentally buried alive.

== Appearances ==
Originally from Brazil, Paulo is a con artist working with his American girlfriend Nikki, an actress. Paulo works as a chef for a wealthy television executive in Sydney. Nikki guest stars on the executive's show and also seduces him, which makes Paulo uncomfortable. Paulo murders the executive by poisoning his food, allowing him and Nikki to steal his bag of diamonds, which are worth $8 million. Three days later, on September 22, 2004, Nikki and Paulo board Oceanic Flight 815 to return to Nikki's home in Los Angeles.

They lose the diamonds in the plane crash and spend much of their time on the island searching for them. Paulo suspects they are the only reason for their relationship, and thus does not tell Nikki when he finds them on their thirty-third day after the crash. One day while looking in the jungle, they come across the DHARMA Initiative's Pearl Station, a scientific research station built in the early 1980s. Nikki is uninterested, but Paulo later returns by himself on his forty-ninth day on the island, hiding the diamonds in the toilet. While in the washroom, Paulo overhears two of the mysterious and dangerous island inhabitants known as the Others speak of capturing some of Paulo's fellow survivors; however, he keeps this information to himself.

On their seventy-second day on the island, Nikki and Paulo join Locke when he ventures back to the Pearl Station, hoping to communicate with the Others. Paulo returns to the toilet to retrieve the diamonds, storing them in his underwear thereafter. As they leave, the group witnesses Mr. Eko's death and burial not far from The Pearl. Eighty-one days after the crash, Nikki finds out about Paulo hiding the diamonds from her. Furious, she releases a venomous spider on him that causes Paulo to be paralyzed for the next eight hours. As he is entering the state of paralysis, Paulo admits he only kept the diamonds from her because he thought she would leave him after she got them. To Nikki's dismay, the death of the venomous spider only attracted more spiders which bite Nikki, so she is also temporarily paralyzed. The pair are mistaken for dead after being discovered by the survivors. Nikki and Paulo are then buried alive by James "Sawyer" Ford and Hugo "Hurley" Reyes after tossing the diamonds in the grave with them as they consider them to be of no value on the island. Much later, Miles Straume − a psychic who can read people's thoughts from their time of death − indicates he knows about the diamonds.

== Characteristics ==
Paulo was written to be unlikable, with the hope he would redeem himself when his backstory was revealed in his final episode. Paulo either resents or is indifferent toward the often heroic actions of some of the survivors, spending much of his time golfing. He complains to Nikki about not being included; however, he does little to help out around the camp and does not try to improve his status in the survivors' hierarchy. When he does get chances to participate in treks, for example, when Hurley finds a car, Paulo is uninterested and discourages Nikki from joining Hurley on his adventure. Nikki tries to participate, tending to a wounded Mr. Eko and volunteering to go with Locke to the Pearl station, much to the surprise of Paulo. Paulo accompanies her, and he exhibits constant sarcastic behavior in the Pearl.

Nikki is manipulative of Paulo and appears to care more about the diamonds than her relationship. After the crash, Paulo becomes suspicious Nikki is just using him to get the diamonds. The first thing she asks him after the crash is the whereabouts of the diamonds and avoids answering Paulo when he asks if they would still be together if she did not need him to help find the diamonds. Paulo does what Nikki tells him to because of his fear of losing her, which results in their deaths.

== Creation ==
At the end of the first season, the writers had the idea one of the background survivors would emerge and receive an on-island flashback episode to help answer the question, "What the hell is going on with the other 35 people who nothing ever happens to?" The first of those was Leslie Arzt, only for him to explode a few episodes later. The writers originally conceived of only a woman, who was previously an actress, would be introduced into the main storyline, but the idea later changed to include her boyfriend as well. Nikki and Paulo were also originally set "to have anchored a winking arc of stories". However the writers instead decided to tell their story in one episode and quickly remove the characters, due to complaints about the characters and the third season's decline in viewership. It also became a running gag that Sawyer did not know who Nikki and Paulo were, calling them "Nina" and "Pablo" and asking "who the hell [they were]". Lindelof later stated, "We had the feeling with Nikki and Paulo that it wasn't right about a month before the fans started reacting. We were already starting to think, 'Maybe our instinct here has been wrong.'"

Nikki and Paulo's original introduction onto the show was deleted for time from the final cut of the episode "Further Instructions". They were supposed to be accidentally found by Claire Littleton in Jack's tent having sex in the middle of the episode. They were instead introduced at the end of the episode when Locke makes a speech.

== Casting ==
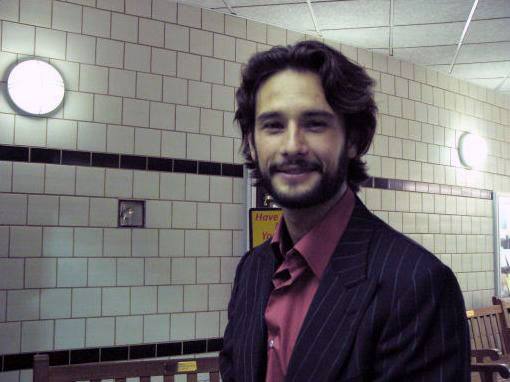
Santoro in New York City in May 2004

Half-French, half-Puerto Rican Kiele Michelle Sanchez portrayed Nikki in six episodes of the third season of Lost. She had trouble filming her burial scene due to her claustrophobia. Rodrigo Santoro, who has been called "the Brazilian Tom Cruise" and "the Brazilian Russell Crowe", was cast in his first major American television role as Paulo on Lost. Appearing in a total of seven episodes, Santoro was reportedly paid "between $2634 and $6427 a week". Lindelof called Santoro "talented" and "perfect for Lost because he's a face that the American audience is not familiar with", despite being an award-winning actor in his home country of Brazil. Part of the reason Santoro was cast over other actors was because his physique was deemed attractive; however, the writers said that they were not interested in writing for his character with that in mind, nor did he want them to. Santoro has stated he enjoyed working with Sanchez and hoped to return to work on Lost.

== Reception ==
Reaction to the "devious, but doomed" characters was more negative than for other Lost characters. One Entertainment Weekly journalist gave Paulo the nickname "Paulo Poops-a-Lot", referencing scenes from the episodes "The Cost of Living" and "Enter 77". America Online's TV Squad criticized the writing for the characters, and the characters were called "incredibly annoying" by Maclean's magazine. Television Without Pity called Paulo "walking collateral damage". TV Guide wrote they were "too darn perfect-looking to be believable as humans". Entertainment Weekly included them in their list of the "21 Most Annoying TV Characters Ever", commenting "no one could have predicted how grating the pair's whiny inanity would become."

When rumors circulated on the Internet and were mentioned in ABC commercials that the characters were going to die, some viewers hoped for a "double murder" of Nikki and Paulo and rejoiced when their wish was granted. Over three months before the episode aired on television, Santoro stated in an interview with Brazilian Rolling Stone that his character would die in the middle of the third season. It was also announced that Sanchez had signed on to film a fall 2007 pilot for another ABC show, Football Wives, and thus, it would have been unlikely for her to continue to act as a "murderous femme fatale".
