= Adetokumboh M'Cormack =

Sierra Leonean actor

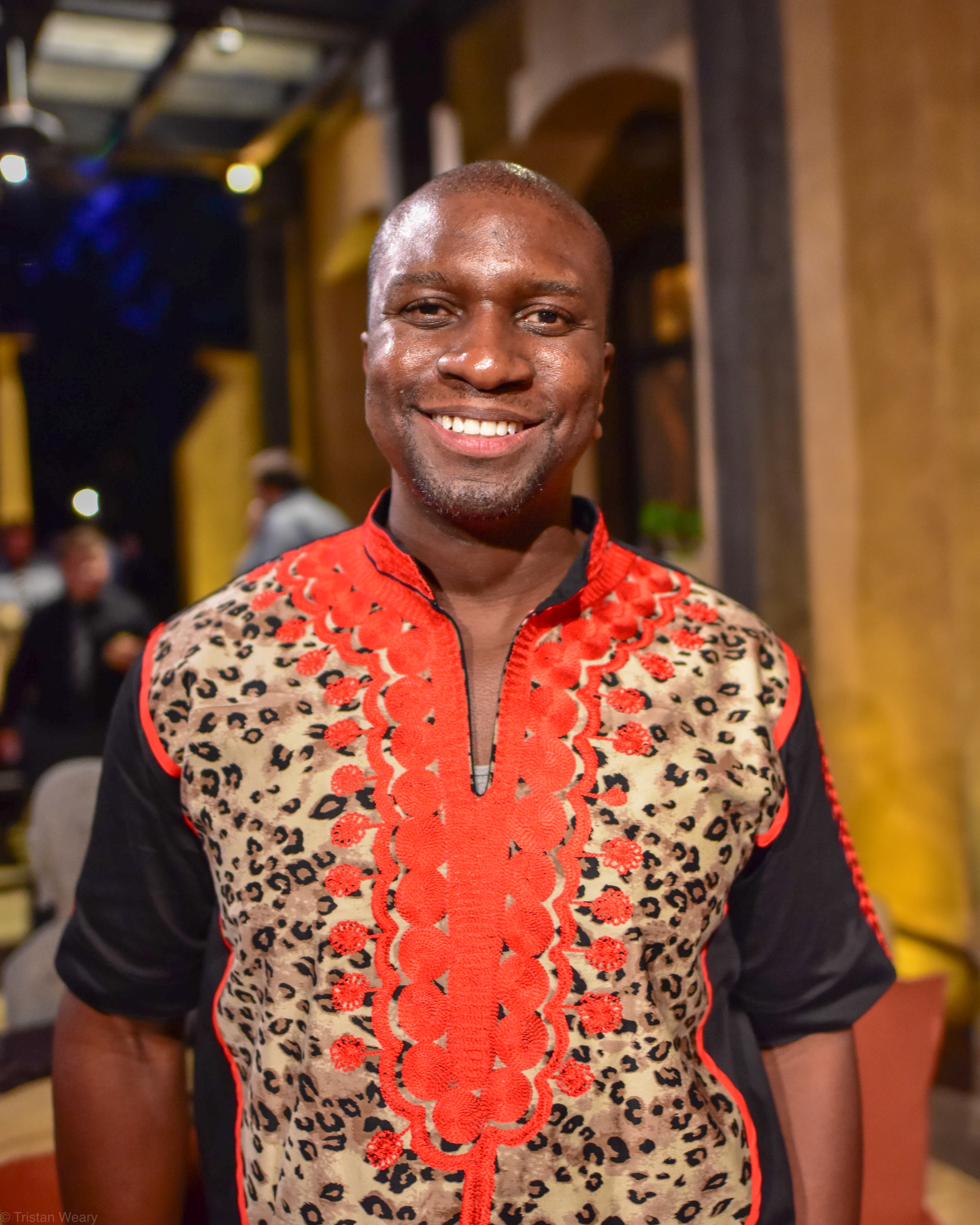
- M'Cormack in 2018
- Born: 27 February 1982 (age 44); Freetown, Sierra Leone
- Education: State University of New York, Purchase (BFA)
- Occupation: Actor
- Years active: 1995–present

Frederick Adetokumboh M'Cormack (born February 27, 1982), sometimes credited as Ade McCormack, Frederick McCormack, or Adetokumoh McCormack, is a Sierra Leonean actor, known for his roles in the television series Lost, Heroes, Castlevania, and X-Men '97.

== Personal life ==
M'Cormack was born in Freetown to Sierra Leone Creole parents. He lived in Nigeria and Kenya before attending SUNY Purchase in New York. He currently resides in Los Angeles.

== Career ==
He has appeared in numerous TV-series, and he portrayed a recurring character on Lost as Mr. Eko's deceased brother, Yemi. He also portrays the recurring role of Tuko on Heroes. He played Zeze Eto'o in 24 during season 7, episodes 4 and 5, and the recurring antagonist Isaac on Castlevania.

His first feature film was the Academy award-nominated Blood Diamond (2006).

== Filmography ==
=== Film ===
Year	Title	Role	Notes
2006	Blood Diamond	R.U.F. Trainer	
2011	Battle: Los Angeles	"Doc"	
2013	Beyond the Mask	Joshua Brand	
2014	Captain America: The Winter Soldier	French Radio Pirate	

=== Television ===
Year	Title	Role	Notes
1995	The Great Elephant Escape	Jomo Batiany	
2005	Whiskey Echo	Simon Mabor	
2006	Lost	Yemi	3 episodes
2006	The Unit	Ammanuel	Episode: "Unannounced"
2006–2007	Gilmore Girls	Philip	3 episodes
2007	Without a Trace	Isaac Garang	Episode: "Lost Boy"
2007	Heroes	Tuko	4 episodes
2009	24	Zeze Eto'o	2 episodes
2015	NCIS	Matthew Rousseau	3 episodes
2018–2021	Castlevania	Isaac (voice)	18 episodes
2020	Fast & Furious Spy Racers	Anir (voice)	2 episodes
2020–2025	Blood of Zeus	Kofi (voice)	14 episodes
2021	A Tale Dark & Grimm	Lord Meister, Furur, Skeptical Hunter (voice)	5 episodes
2024–2026	X-Men '97	Young En Sabah Nur (voice)	3 episodes

=== Video games ===
Year	Title	Role	Notes
2010	Remington Super Slam Hunting: Africa	Announcer	
2016	Uncharted 4: A Thief's End	Shoreline Mercenaries	
