= Lost (TV series) =

American television series (2004–2010)

- Genre: Adventure; Drama; Mystery; Science fiction; Supernatural; Survival; Thriller
- Created by: Jeffrey Lieber; J. J. Abrams; Damon Lindelof
- Showrunners: Damon Lindelof; Carlton Cuse
- Starring: Various: Naveen Andrews; Emilie de Ravin; Matthew Fox; Jorge Garcia; Maggie Grace; Josh Holloway; Malcolm David Kelley; Daniel Dae Kim; Yunjin Kim; Evangeline Lilly; Dominic Monaghan; Terry O'Quinn; Harold Perrineau; Ian Somerhalder; Adewale Akinnuoye-Agbaje; Michelle Rodriguez; Cynthia Watros; Henry Ian Cusick; Michael Emerson; Elizabeth Mitchell; Kiele Sanchez; Rodrigo Santoro; Jeremy Davies; Ken Leung; Rebecca Mader; Néstor Carbonell; Jeff Fahey; Zuleikha Robinson; Sam Anderson; L. Scott Caldwell; François Chau; Fionnula Flanagan; John Terry; Sonya Walger
- Composer: Michael Giacchino
- Country of origin: United States
- Original language: English
- No. of seasons: 6
- No. of episodes: 121 (list of episodes)

Production
- Executive producers: Various: J. J. Abrams; Damon Lindelof; Bryan Burk; Carlton Cuse; Jack Bender; Jeff Pinkner; Stephen Williams; Edward Kitsis; Adam Horowitz; Jean Higgins; Elizabeth Sarnoff
- Production locations: Oahu, Hawaii
- Camera setup: Single-camera
- Running time: 38–53 minutes
- Production companies: Grass Skirt Productions; Bad Robot; ABC Studios (Note: Credited as Touchstone Television for seasons 1–3)

Original release
- Network: ABC
- Release: September 22, 2004 – May 23, 2010

Lost is an American television series created by Jeffrey Lieber, J. J. Abrams, and Damon Lindelof. Its 121 episodes aired on ABC over six seasons between 2004 and 2010. It follows the survivors of an airline crash who are stranded on a mysterious island in the South Pacific Ocean. Episodes typically feature a primary storyline set on the island, with flashback or flashforward sequences which provide additional insight into the involved characters. The series features an ensemble cast, including Naveen Andrews, Emilie de Ravin, Matthew Fox, Jorge Garcia, Josh Holloway, Daniel Dae Kim, Yunjin Kim, Evangeline Lilly, Dominic Monaghan, Terry O'Quinn, Harold Perrineau, Henry Ian Cusick, Michael Emerson, and Elizabeth Mitchell.

Lindelof and Carlton Cuse served as showrunners and were executive producers along with Abrams and Bryan Burk. Inspired by the 2000 film Cast Away, the show is told in a heavily serialized manner. Due to its large ensemble cast and the cost of filming primarily on location in Oahu, Hawaii, the series was one of the most expensive on television, with the pilot alone costing over $14 million. The fictional universe and mythology of Lost were expanded upon by a number of related media—most importantly a series of mini-episodes, called Missing Pieces, and a 12-minute epilogue called "The New Man in Charge".

Lost has been ranked by multiple publications as one of the greatest television series of all time. (Note: Attributed to multiple references:) The first season had an estimated average of 16 million viewers per episode, while the sixth and final season averaged over 11 million U.S. viewers per episode. The series finale received a polarized reaction from both fans and television critics. Lost was the recipient of hundreds of industry award nominations throughout its run and won many of these awards, including the Primetime Emmy Award for Outstanding Drama Series (2005), Best American Import at the British Academy Television Awards (2005), the Golden Globe Award for Best Television Series – Drama (2006) and the Screen Actors Guild Award for Outstanding Performance by an Ensemble in a Drama Series.

== Series overview ==
Season	Episodes	Originally released		Avg. viewers (millions)	Rank
Season	Episodes	First released	Last released	Avg. viewers (millions)	Rank
1	25	September 22, 2004	May 25, 2005	15.69	15
2	24	September 21, 2005	May 24, 2006	15.50	15
3	23	October 4, 2006	May 23, 2007	17.84	10
4	14	January 31, 2008	May 29, 2008	13.40	17
5	17	January 21, 2009	May 13, 2009	10.94	28
6	18	February 2, 2010	May 23, 2010	10.08	31

=== Season 1 ===
Season 1 begins with the aftermath of a plane crash, which leaves the surviving passengers of Oceanic Airlines Flight 815 on what seems to be an uninhabited tropical island. Spinal surgeon Jack Shephard becomes their leader. Their survival is threatened by a number of mysterious entities, including polar bears, an unseen creature that roams the jungle (the "Smoke Monster"), and the island's malevolent inhabitants, known as "The Others". They encounter a French woman named Danielle Rousseau, who was shipwrecked on the island 16 years before the crash and is desperate for news of her daughter, Alex. They also find a mysterious metal hatch buried in the ground. While two survivors, Locke and Boone, try to open the hatch, Michael, Jin, Walt, and Sawyer attempt to leave on a raft that they have built. Meanwhile, flashbacks center on details of the individual survivors' lives prior to the plane crash.

=== Season 2 ===
Season 2 follows the growing conflict between the survivors and the Others. The four survivors on the raft are ambushed by the Others, and they take Michael's son Walt. The survivors are forced to return to the island, where they find the tail-section survivors (the "Tailies"). A power struggle between Jack and Locke over control of the guns and medicine located in the hatch develops and is resolved by Sawyer when he gains control of them. The hatch is revealed to be a research station built 30 years earlier by the DHARMA Initiative, a scientific research project that involved conducting experiments on the island. A man named Desmond Hume had been living in the hatch for three years, activating a computer program every 108 minutes to prevent an unknown catastrophic event from occurring. To recover his son, Michael betrays the survivors, and Jack, Sawyer, and Kate are captured. Michael is given a boat and leaves the island with his son, while Locke destroys the computer in the hatch, resulting in an electromagnetic discharge. This causes the island to be detected by scientists working for Penny Widmore, and it is revealed that a similar event caused the breakup of the plane.

=== Season 3 ===
In season 3, the crash survivors learn more about the Others and their long history on the mysterious island, along with the fate of the Dharma Initiative. The leader of the Others, Ben Linus, is introduced and defections from both sides pave the way for conflict between the two. Time travel elements also begin to appear in the series, as Desmond is forced to turn the fail-safe key in the hatch to stop the electromagnetic event, and this sends his mind eight years in the past. When he returns to the present, he is able to see the future. Kate and Sawyer escape the Others, while Jack stays after Ben promises that Jack will be able to leave the island in a submarine if he operates on Ben, who has cancer. Jack does, but the submarine is destroyed by Locke. Jack is left behind with Juliet, an Other, who also seeks to leave the island, while Locke joins the Others. A helicopter carrying Naomi crashes near the island. Naomi says her freighter, Kahana, is eighty miles offshore and was sent by Penny, Desmond's ex-girlfriend. Desmond has a vision in which Charlie will drown after shutting down a signal that prevents communication with the outside world. His vision comes true, but Charlie speaks with Penny, who says she does not know Naomi. Before drowning, Charlie writes "Not Penny's boat" on his hand so that Desmond can warn the other survivors. Meanwhile, the survivors make contact with a rescue team aboard the freighter. In the season finale, apparent flashbacks show a depressed Jack going to an unknown person's funeral. In the final scene, these are revealed to be "flashforwards", and Kate and Jack are revealed to have escaped the island, but Jack believes that they "have to go back".

=== Season 4 ===
Season 4 focuses on the survivors dealing with the arrival of people from the freighter, who have been sent to the island to reclaim it from Ben. "Flashforwards" continue, in which it is seen how six survivors, dubbed the "Oceanic Six", live their lives after escaping the island. The "Oceanic Six" are Jack, Kate, Hurley, Sayid, Sun, and Aaron. In the present, four members of the freighter arrive and team up with the survivors to escape the island, since the crew of the freighter have orders to kill everyone who stays. Meanwhile, Ben travels with Locke to see Jacob, the island's leader. Locke enters his cabin but finds Jack's dead father, Christian, who says he can speak on Jacob's behalf, and orders Locke to "move" the island. Ben takes Locke to an underground station in which time travel was researched. Locke becomes the new leader of the Others, while Ben moves the island by turning a frozen wheel, after which he is transported to the Sahara. The six survivors escape in a helicopter as they watch the island disappear and are subsequently rescued by Penny. It is then that Desmond and Penny reunite. In the season's finale, it is revealed that the funeral Jack went to in the "flashforward" was that of Locke, who had been seeking out the Oceanic Six in his efforts to convince them to return to the island.

=== Season 5 ===
Season 5 follows two timelines. The first timeline takes place on the island where the survivors who were left behind erratically jump forward and backward through time. In one of these time periods, Locke speaks with Richard Alpert, one of the Others, who says that to save the island, he must bring everyone back. Locke goes to the same underground station Ben went to. After moving the island himself, Locke is transported to the Sahara in 2007, as the time shifts on the island stop and the survivors are stranded with the DHARMA Initiative in 1974. In 2007, Locke contacts the Oceanic Six but fails to convince them to return. Locke tells Jack his father is alive on the island. This causes Jack to start taking flights every week, hoping to crash back on the island. Ben finds Locke and kills him. After Locke's death, the Oceanic Six are told to board Ajira Airways Flight 316 to return to the island and in order to go back, they have to take Locke's body in the plane. They take the flight, but some land in 1977, where they meet with the other survivors who are now part of the DHARMA Initiative, and others land in 2007. The survivors in 1977 are told by Daniel Faraday that if they detonate a hydrogen bomb at the Swan construction site, the electromagnetic energy below it will be destroyed; as a result, the hatch would never be built, and the plane would not crash. In 2007, Locke apparently comes back to life. He instructs Richard to speak with a time-traveling Locke and tell him that he must bring everyone back to the island. After this, he goes to speak with Jacob. The season finale reveals that Locke is still dead and another entity has taken over his form to manipulate Ben into killing Jacob. In 1977, Juliet detonates the fission core taken from the hydrogen bomb.

=== Season 6 ===
Season 6, the final season, also follows two timelines. In the first timeline, the survivors are sent to the present day, as the death of Jacob allows his brother, the Man in Black (the original form of the Smoke Monster) to take over the island. Having assumed the form of Locke, the Smoke Monster seeks to escape the island and forces a final war between the forces of good and evil.

The second timeline, called the "flash-sideways" narrative, follows the lives of the main characters in a setting where Oceanic 815 never crashed. In the final episodes, a flashback to the distant past shows the origins of the island's power and of the conflict between Jacob and the Man in Black, who are revealed to be twin brothers, with Jacob desperate to keep his brother from leaving the island after he is transmogrified by the power of the island and becomes the Smoke Monster.

Jacob's machinations are revealed: everyone was pushed by fate and his manipulation to be on the Oceanic flight as many of the members of the flight were deemed "candidates" by Jacob to be the new protector of the island after his death. The Man in Black's mission since the beginning was to kill all of the candidates, thereby allowing him to leave the island once and for all. The ghost of Jacob appears to the surviving candidates, and Jack is appointed as the new protector. Jack catches up with the Man in Black, who says that he wants to go to the "Heart of the Island" to turn it off and finally leave the island. They reach the place, but after doing this, the Man in Black becomes mortal. The Man in Black is killed by Jack and Kate, but Jack is seriously injured in the process. Hurley becomes the new protector of the island. Several of the survivors die in the conflict or stay on the island, and the remaining escape in the Ajira plane once and for all. Jack returns to the "Heart of the Island" and turns it on again, saving it. Hurley, as the new protector, asks Ben to help him in his new job, which he agrees to do. Having saved the island, Jack dies peacefully in the same place in which he woke up when he arrived on the island.

The series finale reveals that the flash-sideways timeline is actually a form of purgatory in the afterlife, where some of the survivors and other characters from the island are reunited after death. In the last scene, the survivors are all reunited in a church where they "move on" together.

=== Mythology and interpretations ===
Episodes of Lost include a number of mysterious elements ascribed to science fiction or supernatural phenomena. The creators of the series refer to these elements as composing the mythology of the series, and they formed the basis of fan speculation. The show's mythological elements include a "Smoke Monster" that roams the island, a mysterious group of inhabitants whom the survivors called "The Others" or "Natives", a scientific organization called the Dharma Initiative that placed several research stations on the island, a sequence of numbers that frequently appears in the lives of the characters in the past, present, and future, and personal connections (synchronicity) between the characters of which they are often unaware.

At the heart of the series is a complex and cryptic storyline, which spawned numerous questions and discussions among viewers. Encouraged by Lost's writers and stars, who often interacted with fans online, viewers and TV critics alike took to widespread theorizing in an attempt to unravel the mysteries. Theories mainly concerned the nature of the island, the origins of the "Monster" and the "Others", the meaning of the numbers, and the reasons for both the crash and the survival of some passengers. Several of the more common fan theories were discussed and rejected by the show's creators, the most common being that the survivors of Oceanic flight 815 are dead and in purgatory. Lindelof rejected speculation that spaceships or aliens influenced the events on the island or that everything seen was a fictional reality taking place in someone's mind. Carlton Cuse dismissed the theory that the island was a reality TV show and the castaways unwitting housemates, and Lindelof many times denied the theory that the "Monster" was a nanobot cloud similar to the one featured in Michael Crichton's novel Prey (which happened to share the protagonist's name, Jack).

==== Recurring elements ====
There are several recurring elements and motifs on Lost, which generally have no direct effect on the story itself but expand the show's literary and philosophical subtext. These elements include frequent appearances of black and white, which reflect the dualism within characters and situations; as well as rebellion in almost all characters, especially Kate; dysfunctional family situations (especially ones that revolve around the fathers of many characters), as portrayed in the lives of nearly all the main characters; apocalyptic references, including Desmond's pushing the button to forestall the end of the world; coincidence versus fate, revealed most apparently through the juxtaposition of the characters Locke and Mr. Eko; conflict between science and faith, embodied by the leadership tug-of-war between Jack and Locke and their stark disagreements on subjects such as the hatch, the button, and leaving the island; the struggle between good and evil, shown by the relationship between Jacob and the Man in Black, several times by Locke using symbols such as his backgammon set, also the white and black rocks that the Man in Black referred to as an "inside joke"; and references to numerous works of literature, including mentions and discussions of particular novels. One notable reference to a novel is John Steinbeck's Of Mice and Men, usually when Sawyer is seen reading it or referencing it. There are also many allusions in characters' names to famous historical thinkers and writers, such as Ben Linus (after chemist Linus Pauling), John Locke (after the philosopher) and his alias Jeremy Bentham (after the philosopher), Danielle Rousseau (after philosopher Jean-Jacques Rousseau), Desmond David Hume (after philosopher David Hume), Juliet's ex-husband (after philosopher Edmund Burke), Mikhail Bakunin (after the anarchist philosopher), Daniel Faraday (after physicist Michael Faraday), Eloise Hawking (after physicist Stephen Hawking), George Minkowski (after mathematician Hermann Minkowski), Richard Alpert (the birth name of spiritual teacher Ram Dass), Boone Carlyle (after pioneer Daniel Boone and philosopher Thomas Carlyle), and Charlotte Staples Lewis (after author Clive Staples (C.S.) Lewis).

== Cast and characters ==
From left to right: Faraday, Boone, Miles, Michael, Ana Lucia, Charlotte, Frank, Shannon, Desmond, Eko, Kate, Jack, Sawyer, Locke, Ben, Sayid, Libby, Sun, Jin, Claire, Hurley, Juliet, Charlie, Richard, Bernard, Rose, and Vincent

Of the 324 people on board Oceanic Flight 815, there are 70 initial survivors (as well as one dog) spread across the three sections of the plane crash. Although a large cast made Lost more expensive to produce, the writers benefited from added flexibility in story decisions. According to series executive producer Bryan Burk, "You can have more interactions between characters and create more diverse characters, more back stories, more love triangles."

Lost was planned as a multicultural show with an international cast. The initial season had 14 regular speaking roles that received star billing; though most of these actors remained on the show for the duration of its run (including flashbacks and alternate timelines), no single actor appeared in all 121 episodes. Matthew Fox played the protagonist, a troubled surgeon named Jack Shephard. Evangeline Lilly portrayed fugitive Kate Austen. Jorge Garcia played Hugo "Hurley" Reyes, an unlucky lottery winner. Josh Holloway played a con man, James "Sawyer" Ford. Ian Somerhalder played Boone Carlyle, chief operating officer of his mother's wedding business, and Maggie Grace played his stepsister Shannon Rutherford, a former dance teacher. Harold Perrineau portrayed construction worker and aspiring artist Michael Dawson, while Malcolm David Kelley played his young son, Walt Lloyd. Terry O'Quinn played the mysterious John Locke. Naveen Andrews portrayed former Iraqi Republican Guard Sayid Jarrah. Emilie de Ravin played a young Australian mother-to-be, Claire Littleton. Yunjin Kim played Sun-Hwa Kwon, the daughter of a powerful and incredibly wealthy Korean businessman and mobster, with Daniel Dae Kim as her husband and father's enforcer Jin-Soo Kwon. Dominic Monaghan played English ex-rock star and drug addict Charlie Pace.

=== Seasons 1 and 2 ===
During the first two seasons, some characters were written out, while new characters with new stories were added. Boone Carlyle was written out near the end of season one, and Walt became an intermittent character, making occasional appearances throughout season two after he is captured by The Others in the season one finale. Shannon's departure eight episodes into season two made way for newcomers Mr. Eko, a former Nigerian militia leader and fake Catholic priest played by Adewale Akinnuoye-Agbaje; Ana Lucia Cortez, an airport TSA guard and former LAPD police officer played by Michelle Rodriguez; and Libby Smith, a purported clinical psychologist and formerly mentally ill woman portrayed by Cynthia Watros. Ana Lucia and Libby were written out of the series toward the end of season two after being shot by Michael, who then left the island along with his son.

=== Seasons 3 and 4 ===
In season three, two actors were promoted from recurring to starring roles: Henry Ian Cusick as former Scottish soldier Desmond Hume; and Michael Emerson as the manipulative leader of the Others, Ben Linus. In addition, three new actors joined the regular cast: Elizabeth Mitchell, as fertility doctor and Other Juliet Burke; and Kiele Sanchez and Rodrigo Santoro as background survivor couple Nikki Fernandez and Paulo. Several characters died in the season: Eko was killed off when Akinnuoye-Agbaje did not wish to continue on the show, Nikki and Paulo were buried alive mid-season after poor fan response, and in the third-season finale, Charlie dies a hero.

In season four, Harold Perrineau rejoined the main cast to reprise the role of Michael, now suicidal and on a desperate redemptive journey to atone for his previous crimes. Along with Perrineau, additional new actors—Jeremy Davies as Daniel Faraday, a nervous physicist who takes a scientific interest in the island; Ken Leung as Miles Straume, a sarcastic supposed ghost whisperer; and Rebecca Mader as Charlotte Staples Lewis, a hard-headed and determined anthropologist and successful academic—joined the cast. Michael was written out in the fourth-season finale. Claire, who mysteriously disappears with her dead father near the end of the season, did not return as a series regular for the fifth season but returned for the sixth and final season.

=== Seasons 5 and 6 ===
In season five, no new characters joined the main cast. Charlotte exited the series in episode five, and Daniel exited in the third to last episode. In season six, Juliet exited in the first episode and three previously recurring characters were upgraded to starring status: Néstor Carbonell as the mysterious, ageless Other Richard Alpert; Jeff Fahey as the pilot Frank Lapidus; and Zuleikha Robinson as Ajira Airways Flight 316 survivor Ilana Verdansky. Former cast members Ian Somerhalder, Dominic Monaghan, Rebecca Mader, Jeremy Davies, Elizabeth Mitchell, Maggie Grace, Michelle Rodriguez, Harold Perrineau, and Cynthia Watros made return appearances.

=== Supporting characters ===
Numerous supporting characters were given expansive and recurring appearances in the progressive storyline. Danielle Rousseau (Mira Furlan)—a French member of an earlier scientific expedition to the island, first encountered as a voice recording in the pilot episode—appears throughout the series. She is searching for her daughter, who later turns up in the form of Alex Rousseau (Tania Raymonde). Alex has been kidnapped by Ben Linus and brought to the Others where she was raised. Cindy (Kimberley Joseph), an Oceanic flight attendant who first appeared in the pilot, survived the crash and, subsequently, became one of the Others.

In the second season, married couple Rose Nadler (L. Scott Caldwell) and Bernard Nadler (Sam Anderson), separated on opposite sides of the island (she with the main characters, he with the tail section survivors), were featured in a flashback episode after being reunited. The second season also introduces Dr. Pierre Chang (Francois Chau), a member of the mysterious Dharma Initiative who appears in the orientation films for its numerous stations located throughout the island. Corporate magnate Charles Widmore (Alan Dale) has connections to both Ben and Desmond. Desmond is in love with Widmore's daughter Penelope "Penny" Widmore (Sonya Walger).

Eloise Hawking (Fionnula Flanagan), introduced in the third season, is Daniel Faraday's mother and also has connections with Desmond. The introduction of the Others featured Tom Friendly (M. C. Gainey), and Ethan Rom (William Mapother), all of whom have been shown in both flashbacks and the ongoing story. Jack's father Christian Shephard (John Terry) has appeared in multiple flashbacks of various characters. In the third season, Naomi Dorrit (Marsha Thomason), the team leader of a group hired by Widmore to find Ben Linus, parachutes onto the island. One member of her team includes the ruthless mercenary Martin Keamy (Kevin Durand).

In the finale episode "The End", recurring guest stars Sam Anderson; L. Scott Caldwell; Francois Chau; Fionnula Flanagan; Sonya Walger; and John Terry were credited under the "starring" rubric alongside the principal cast. The mysterious black smoke cloud-like entity, known as "the Monster", appeared in human form during season five and six as a middle-aged man dressed in black robes, who was played by Titus Welliver, and in season six, it appears in the form of John Locke played by O'Quinn in a dual role. His rival, Jacob, was played by Mark Pellegrino.

== Production ==
Official production logo, initially used before the airing of the series.

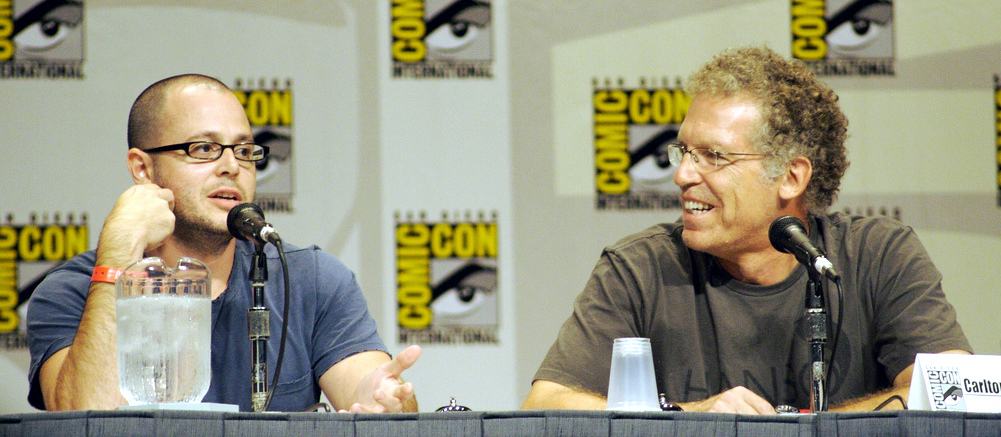
Damon Lindelof (left) co-created the series and served as an executive producer and showrunner alongside Carlton Cuse (right).

Lost was produced by ABC Studios, Bad Robot, and Grass Skirt Productions. Throughout its run, the executive producers of the series were Damon Lindelof, J. J. Abrams, Bryan Burk, Carlton Cuse, Jack Bender, Jeff Pinkner, Edward Kitsis, Adam Horowitz, Jean Higgins, and Elizabeth Sarnoff, with Lindelof and Cuse serving as showrunners.

=== Conception ===
The series was conceived by Lloyd Braun, head of ABC at the time, while he was on vacation in Hawaii during 2003, as a television adaptation of the 2000 Tom Hanks film Cast Away, crossed with elements of the popular reality show Survivor. Braun later pitched his ideas for Cast Away – The Series at the network's gathering of executives at the Disney's Grand Californian Hotel & Spa in Anaheim, California, describing the concept as "parts Cast Away, Survivor, and Gilligan's Island, with a Lord of the Flies element." Many found the idea laughable, but senior vice president Thom Sherman saw potential and decided to order an initial script from Spelling Television. Spelling producer Ted Gold turned to writer Jeffrey Lieber, who presented a pitch to ABC in September 2003 titled Nowhere, which Sherman approved. Unhappy with the eventual script by Lieber and a subsequent rewrite, in January 2004, Braun contacted J. J. Abrams, who had developed the TV series Alias for ABC, to write a new pilot script. Lieber would later receive a story credit for the Lost pilot and, subsequently, shared the "created by" credit with Abrams and Lindelof, after a request for arbitration at the Writers Guild of America. The one inviolable edict Braun made to Abrams was that the show's title must be Lost, having conceived of the title and being angry at its change to Nowhere by Lieber.

Although initially hesitant, Abrams warmed to the idea on the condition that the series would have a supernatural angle to it and if he had a writing partner. ABC executive Heather Kadin sent him Damon Lindelof, who had long intended to meet Abrams as he wished to write for Alias. Together, Abrams and Lindelof created the series' style and characters and also wrote a series bible that conceived and detailed the major mythological ideas and plot points for an ideal four-to-five-season run for the show. The novel idea of a story arc spanning several years was inspired by Babylon 5. Because ABC felt that Alias was too serialized, Lindelof and Abrams assured the network in the bible that the show would be self-contained: "We promise ... that [each episode] requires NO knowledge of the episode(s) that preceded it ... there is no 'Ultimate Mystery' which requires solving." While such statements contradicted their true plans, the ruse succeeded in persuading ABC to purchase the show. The game Myst, also set in a tropical island, was noted as an influence by Lindelof, as in its narrative, "No one told you what the rules were. You just had to walk around and explore these environments and gradually a story was told."

Abrams created the sound opening of the show and its title card, which were inspired by The Twilight Zone. He withdrew from production of Lost partway through the first season to direct Mission: Impossible III, leaving Lindelof and new executive producer Carlton Cuse to develop much of the overall mythology of the series themselves. However, Abrams briefly returned to help co-write the third-season premiere along with Lindelof. The development of the show was constrained by tight deadlines, as it had been commissioned late in the 2004 season's development cycle. Despite the short schedule, the creative team remained flexible enough to modify or create characters to fit actors they wished to cast.

Lost's two-part pilot episode was the most expensive pilot in ABC history, reportedly costing between US$10 and $14 million, compared to the $4 million average cost of an hour-long pilot at the time. The world premiere of the Lost pilot occurred on July 24, 2004, at San Diego Comic-Con. ABC's parent company Disney fired Braun before Lost's broadcast debut, partly because of low ratings at the network and also because he had greenlit such an expensive and risky project. (Note: Braun later joined Lost as the voice who says "Previously, on Lost" at the beginning of each episode.) Lost had its broadcast debut on September 22, 2004, and became one of the biggest critical and commercial successes of the 2004 television season. Along with the other new shows Desperate Housewives and Grey's Anatomy, Lost helped to reverse the flagging fortunes of ABC, and its great success likely caused the network to ignore that it almost immediately broke promises made by Lindelof and Abrams about the show's plot.

=== Casting ===
Many of the first season roles were a result of the executive producers' liking of various actors. The main character Jack was going to die in the pilot, and the role was planned for Michael Keaton. However, ABC executives were adamant that Jack live. Before it was decided that Jack would live, Kate was to emerge as the leader of the survivors; she was conceived as a middle-aged businesswoman whose husband had apparently died in the crash, a role later fulfilled by the recurring character Rose. Dominic Monaghan auditioned for the role of Sawyer, who at the time was supposed to be a slick suit-wearing city con man. The producers enjoyed Monaghan's performance and changed the character of Charlie, a washed-up former rock star, to fit him. Jorge Garcia also auditioned for Sawyer, and the part of Hurley was written for him. When Josh Holloway auditioned for Sawyer, the producers liked the edge he brought to the character (he reportedly kicked a chair when he forgot his lines and got angry in the audition) and his southern accent, so they changed Sawyer to fit Holloway's acting. Yunjin Kim auditioned for Kate, but the producers wrote the character of Sun for her and the character of Jin, portrayed by Daniel Dae Kim, to be her husband. Sayid, played by Naveen Andrews, was also not in the original script. Locke and Michael were written with their actors in mind. Emilie de Ravin, who played Claire, was cast in what was supposed to be a recurring role. In the second season, Michael Emerson was contracted to play Ben ("Henry Gale") for three episodes. His role was extended to eight episodes because of his acting skills and eventually, for the whole of season three and later seasons.

=== Filming ===
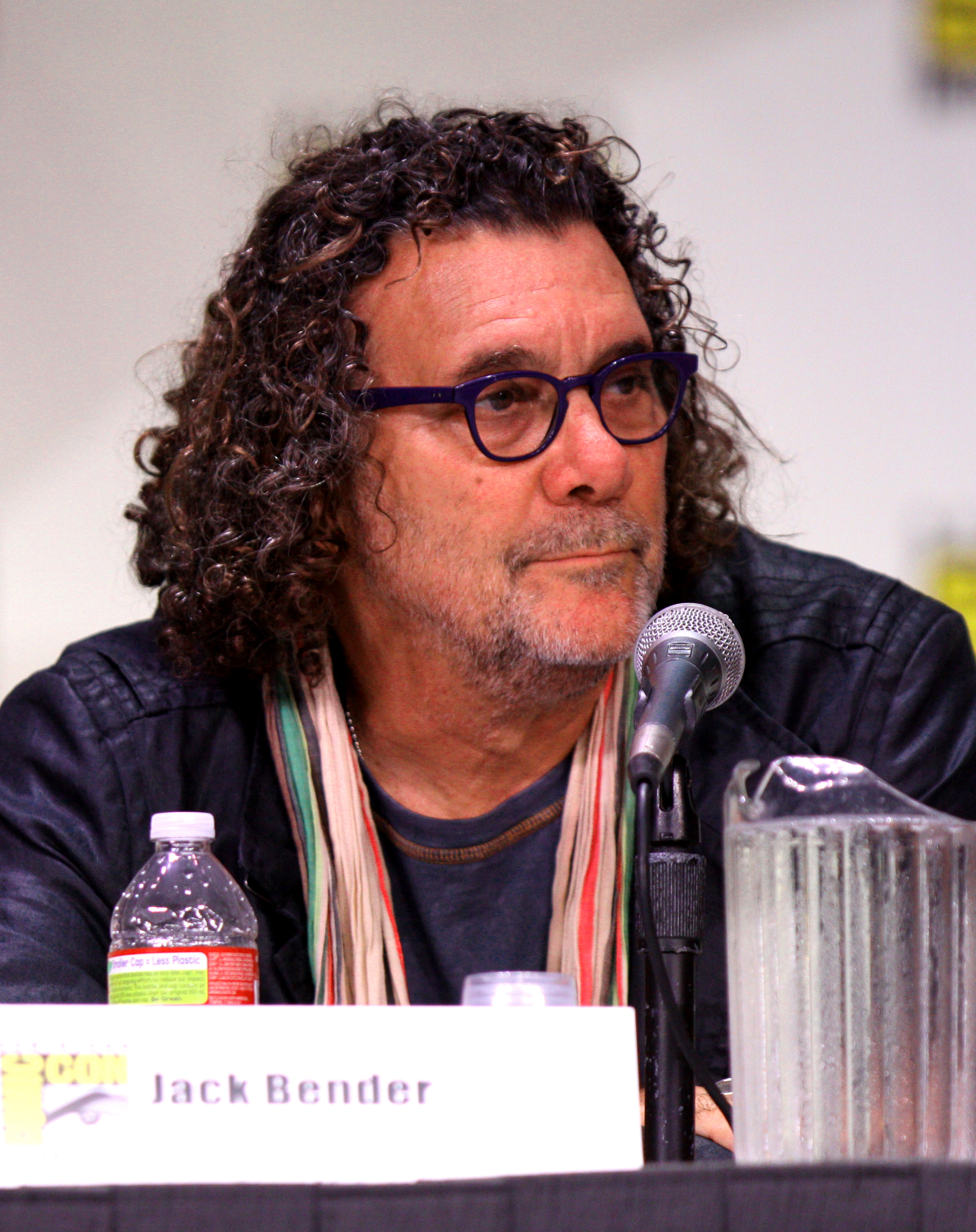
Jack Bender directed the most episodes of the series and also served as an executive producer.

Lost was filmed on Panavision 35 mm cameras almost entirely on the Hawaiian island of Oahu, given the easily accessible, wide diversity of filming locations. The original island scenes for the pilot were filmed at Mokulē'ia Beach, near the northwest tip of the island. Later beach scenes take place in secluded spots of the famous North Shore. Cave scenes in the first season were filmed on a sound stage built at a Xerox parts warehouse, which had been empty since an employee mass shooting took place there in 1999. In 2006, the sound-stage and production offices moved to the Hawaii Film Office-operated Hawaii Film Studio, where the sets depicting Season 2's "Swan Station" and Season 3's "Hydra Station" interiors were built.

Various urban areas in and around Honolulu are used as stand-ins for locations around the world, including California, New York, Iowa, Miami, South Korea, Iraq, Nigeria, United Kingdom, Paris, Thailand, Berlin, Maldives, and Australia. For example, scenes set in a Sydney Airport were filmed at the Hawaii Convention Center, while a World War II-era bunker was used as both an Iraqi Republican Guard installation and a Dharma Initiative research station. Scenes set in Germany during the winter were filmed on Merchant St., with crushed ice scattered everywhere to create snow and Russian store and automobile signs on the street. Several scenes in the Season 3 finale, "Through the Looking Glass", were shot in Los Angeles, including a hospital set borrowed from Grey's Anatomy. Two scenes during season four were filmed in London, because Alan Dale, who portrays Widmore, was at the time performing in the musical Spamalot and was unable to travel to Hawaii. Extensive archives of filming locations are tracked at a repository at the Lost Virtual Tour.

=== Promotion ===
During its six years of broadcasting, Lost developed an extensive collection of promotional tools, ranging from the traditional promotions of the TV show made by the channel to the creation of alternate reality games, such as the Lost Experience. Lost showed innovation in the use of new advertising strategies in the sector and the transformation of the conventional devices used previously.

=== Music ===
Lost features an orchestral score performed by the Hollywood Studio Symphony Orchestra and composed by Michael Giacchino, incorporating many recurring themes for subjects, such as events, locations, and characters. Giacchino achieved some of the sounds for the score using unusual instruments, such as striking suspended pieces of the plane's fuselage. On March 21, 2006, the record label Varèse Sarabande released the original television soundtrack for Lost's first season. The soundtrack included select full-length versions of the most popular themes of the season and the main title, which was composed by series creator J. J. Abrams. Varèse Sarabande released a soundtrack featuring music from season 2 of Lost on October 3, 2006. The soundtrack for season 3 was released on May 6, 2008; the soundtrack for season 4 was released on May 11, 2009; the soundtrack for season 5 was released on May 11, 2010; and the soundtrack for the final season was released on September 14, 2010. A final soundtrack, featuring music from series finale, was released on October 11, 2010.

The series uses pop culture songs sparingly, and has a mainly orchestral score (consisting usually of divided strings, percussion, harp, and three trombones). When it features pop songs, they often originate from a diegetic source. Examples include the various songs played on Hurley's portable CD player throughout the first season (until its batteries died in the episode "...In Translation", which featured Damien Rice's "Delicate") or the use of the record player in the second season, which included Cass Elliot's "Make Your Own Kind of Music" and Petula Clark's "Downtown" in the second and third-season premieres respectively. Two episodes show Charlie on a street corner playing guitar and singing the Oasis song "Wonderwall". In the third season's finale, Jack drives down the street listening to Nirvana's "Scentless Apprentice", right before he arrives to the Hoffs/Drawlar Funeral Parlor, and in the parallel scene in the fourth season's finale, he arrives listening to "Gouge Away" by Pixies. The third season also used Three Dog Night's "Shambala" on two occasions in the van. The only two pop songs that have ever been used without an on-screen source (i.e., non-diegetic) are Ann-Margret's "Slowly", in the episode "I Do" and "I Shall Not Walk Alone", written by Ben Harper and covered by The Blind Boys of Alabama in the episode "Confidence Man". Alternate music is used in several international broadcasts. For example, in the Japanese broadcast of Lost, the theme song used varies by season: season one uses "Here I Am" by Chemistry, season two uses "Losin'" by Yuna Ito, and season three uses "Lonely Girl" by Crystal Kay.

=== Allegations of toxic work environment ===
In May 2023, Maureen Ryan's book Burn It Down: Power, Complicity and a Call For Change in Hollywood cited claims made by cast member Harold Perrineau and writers Monica Owusu-Breen and Melinda Hsu Taylor of an alleged toxic and racist environment fostered by Lindelof and Cuse. Perrineau said he was fired by Lindelof after he asked about his character's death. In response to the allegations, Lindelof stated "my level of fundamental inexperience as a manager and a boss, my role as someone who was supposed to model a climate of creative danger and risk-taking but provide safety and comfort inside of the creative process—I failed in that endeavor". Recurring cast member Mira Furlan also recalled an abusive on-set experience in her memoir. She regarded the entire cast as complicit, with the exception of one main actress.

== Reception and impact ==
=== Critical reception ===
Critical response of Lost
Season	Rotten Tomatoes	Metacritic
1	96% (46 reviews)	86 (27 reviews)
2	100% (17 reviews)	—N/a
3	75% (20 reviews)	—N/a
4	89% (27 reviews)	87 (12 reviews)
5	92% (24 reviews)	78 (17 reviews)
6	69% (35 reviews)	—N/a

Lost has been described by numerous critics as being among the greatest television series of all time. Bill Carter, television reporter of The New York Times, defined Lost as "the show with perhaps the most compelling continuing story line in television history." Entertainment Weekly put the show on its end-of-the-decade, "best-of" list, saying, "Name another network drama that can so wondrously turn a ? into a !" In 2012, Entertainment Weekly also listed the show at #10 in the "25 Best Cult TV Shows from the Past 25 Years", with a hot-and-cold description: "Lost was initially celebrated as a moving character-driven drama with a broad humanistic worldview that also presented itself as dramatic cryptography that demanded to be solved. The appeal narrowed as seasons progressed and the mythology became more complex, culminating in a still-debated finale that was deeply meaningful to some and dissatisfying poppycock to others." In 2007, TV Guide ranked Lost as the #5 cult show. In 2013, TV Guide ranked it as the #5 sci-fi show and the #36 best series of all time. In September 2019, The Guardian ranked the show 71st on its list of the 100 best TV shows of the 21st century.

==== Season 1 ====
The first season received critical acclaim. USA Today said a "totally original, fabulously enjoyable lost-at-sea series", Lost had taken "an outlandish Saturday-serial setup and imbued it with real characters and honest emotions, without sacrificing any of the old-fashioned fun." The Los Angeles Times praised the production values and said "it knows the buttons it wants to push (fear of flying, fear of abandonment, fear of the unknown) and pushes them, repeatedly, like a kid playing a video game." IGN noted that the first season "succeeded first and foremost in character development." Lost season one was ranked number one in the "Best of 2005 TV Coverage: Critic Top Ten Lists" by Matthew Gilbert of The Boston Globe, Tom Gliatto of People Weekly, Charlie McCollum of the San Jose Mercury News, and Robert Bianco of USA Today.

==== Season 2 ====
The second season received favorable reviews, but it was noted that the season "stumbled with some storylines going nowhere and some characters underutilized." IGN also noted the addition of Desmond Hume as a standout new character. The San Francisco Chronicle called Season 2 an "extended, mostly unsatisfying foray into deeper mythology with very little payoff." After winning "Best Drama Series" for season one, Lost was snubbed by the Emmy Awards in Season 2. Near the end of Lost's second season, USA Today listed the most popular fan theories during Season 2—the island as a psychological experiment, that the hatch had electromagnetic properties, string theory of time, and that everyone on the island had developed a "collective consciousness" that allowed them to appear in each other's past. One fan interview by USA Today said that "Real suspense comes from answers, not questions. Suspense comes not from wondering what's going on but from wondering what happens next. If you withhold answers, it becomes impossible to satisfy."

==== Season 3 ====
The first block of episodes of the third season was criticized for raising too many mysteries and not providing enough answers. Complaints were also made about the limited screen time for many of the main characters in the first block. Locke, played by Terry O'Quinn, who had tied for the highest second-season episode count, appeared in only 13 of 23 episodes in the third season—only two more than guest star M.C. Gainey, who played Tom. Reaction to two new characters, Nikki and Paulo, was generally negative, and Lindelof even acknowledged that the couple was "universally despised" by fans. The decision to split the season and the American time-slot switch after the hiatus were also criticized. Cuse acknowledged that, "No one was happy with the six-episode run." The second block of episodes was critically acclaimed, however, with the crew dealing with problems from the first block. More answers were written into the show, and Nikki and Paulo were killed off. It was also announced that the series would end three seasons after the third season, which Cuse hoped would tell the audience that the writers knew where the story was going.

==== Season 4 ====
Metacritic gave season four a weighted average of 87 based on 12 critical reviews, For the first time since season one, Lost received an Emmy nomination for 'Outstanding Drama Series'. Tim Goodman of the San Francisco Chronicle said that the Season 4 episodes were "roller coasters of fast action and revelation" and that series was "back on track." In a survey conducted by TVWeek of professional critics, Lost was voted the best show on television in the first half of 2008 "by a wide margin", apparently "crack[ing] the top five on nearly every critic's submission" and receiving "nothing but praise." The New York Times said the show reveled in critiques of capitalism, using the fictional Mittelos Bioscience and the "malevolent British industrialist" character of Charles Widmore as examples. The critic also said that the show was "in the dark business of exploring just how futile the modern search for peace, knowledge, recovery or profit really is." The critic did go on to say that the series was not as "philosophically refined" as The Sopranos or The Wire but that it "has maximized the potential of narrative uncertainty and made it a beguiling constant."

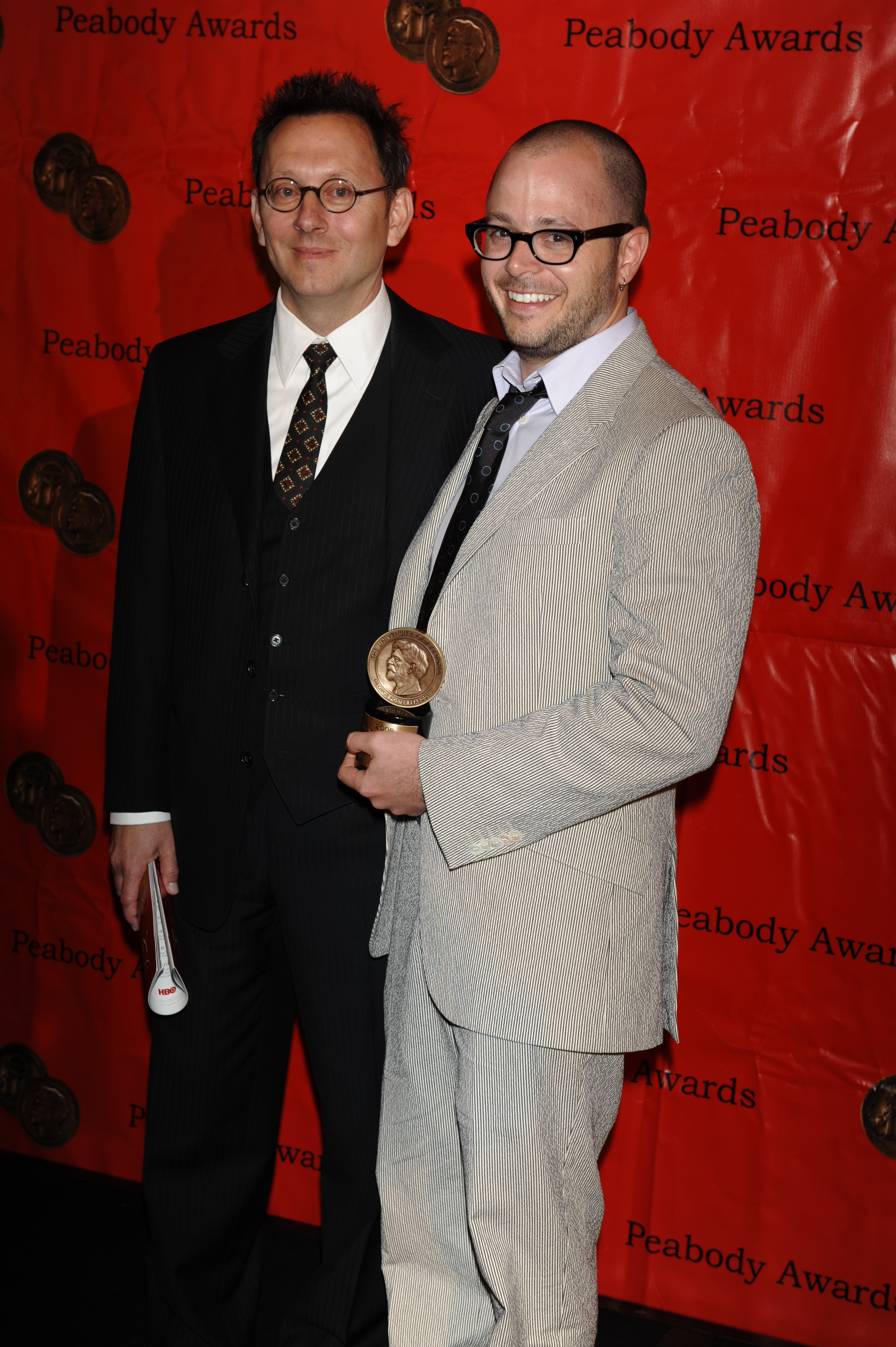
Michael Emerson and Damon Lindelof at the 68th Annual Peabody Awards for Lost

==== Season 5 ====
The fifth season once again received mostly positive critical reception. Season 5 was given a weighted average of 78 out of 100 by Metacritic. Variety said that "The ABC series remains one of primetime's most uncompromising efforts, and this year's latest wrinkle on flashbacks, flash-forwards and island-disappearing flashes of light does nothing to alter that perception." Alan Sepinwall of The Star-Ledger said that season 5 may finally be "a day of reckoning between those viewers who embrace the show's science-fiction trappings, and those who prefer not to think about them." Sepinwall also related that "I loved every minute. But I'm also a geek who read Ray Bradbury and Isaac Asimov growing up."

Heather Havrilesky of Salon.com criticized the use of time travel, saying that "when a narrator brings magic or time travel or an act of God into the picture, then uses it without restraint, the story loses its anchor to real life." The critic also asked "Why does it matter what Locke and Richard Alpert and Daniel Faraday or anyone else does, when they all seem as clueless and unfettered from reality as we are as viewers? How can these characters have any concrete agenda or strategic approach or philosophical perspective on anything when the rug is pulled out from under them by another Act of God every few seconds?"

The New York Times also commented that "what has been most dispiriting about the current season is the show's willingness to abandon many of the larger and more compelling themes that grounded the elaborate plot: the struggles between faith and reason; the indictments of extreme capitalism, the futility of recovery. All that remains is the reductively limned battle between fate and free will largely playing out, now, in Jack Shephard's belief that returning to the island is his Destiny." The A.V. Club said of the fifth-season finale, "Me? I found the ending frustrating, but in a good way. This finale was entertaining as all get-out to me, and despite the occasional groaner moment, I think this may be Lost's most purposeful, surprising finale."

==== Season 6 ====
Season six opened to much hype and curiosity. The A.V. Club asked, "I'm guessing that one of the biggest fears of Lost fans as we ride out this sixth and final season—bumps and all—is that we're going to come to the end and find a big nothing in return for all we've invested in these characters. We don't just need answers, we need justifications. Why has whatever happened, happened? Who has called this particular meeting to order, and does it really matter who showed up?" The episodes "The Substitute", "Dr. Linus", "Ab Aeterno", "Happily Ever After", "The Candidate", and "What They Died For" opened to highly positive critical reception while the third-to-last episode "Across the Sea" was the episode with the most polarized reception of the season. The time spent at the Others' temple was criticized. E! Online described the show as "lightning in a bottle" and picked it as "Top TV Drama of 2010".

==== Series finale ====
The series finale opened to highly polarized critical and fan reception. "The End" received "generally favorable reviews" with a Metacritic score of 74 out of 100 based on 31 critic reviews. IGN reviewer Chris Carbot gave the finale a 10 out of 10, tying it with the initial review of "Pilot, Part 1", "Through the Looking Glass", "The Constant", and "There's No Place Like Home, Parts 2 & 3" as the best-reviewed episode of Lost. He described it as "one of the most enthralling, entertaining and satisfying conclusions I could have hoped for." Carbot also noted that the discussions about the episode may never end, saying "Lost may be gone, but it will hardly be forgotten." Eric Deggans of the St. Petersburg Times also gave the finale a perfect score, stating "Sunday's show was an emotional, funny, expertly measured reminder of what Lost has really centered on since its first moments on the prime time TV landscape: faith, hope, romance and the power of redemption through belief in the best of what moves mankind." Robert Bianco of USA Today rated the episode perfect as well, deeming the finale "can stand with the best any series has produced." Hal Boedeker of Orlando Sentinel cited the finale being "a stunner."

The Guardian and The Daily Telegraph both reported that "The End" had received negative reviews and disappointed its viewers. Alan Sepinwall of Star-Ledger was less enthusiastic of the finale, stating "I'm still wrestling with my feelings about 'The End'... I thought most of it worked like gangbusters. ... But as someone who did spend at least part of the last six years dwelling on the questions that were unanswered—be they little things like the outrigger shootout or why The Others left Dharma in charge of the Swan station after the purge, or bigger ones like Walt—I can't say I found 'The End' wholly satisfying, either as closure for this season or the series. ... There are narrative dead ends in every season of 'Lost,' but it felt like season six had more than usual." Mike Hale of The New York Times gave "The End" a mixed review, as the episode showed that the series was "shaky on the big picture—on organizing the welter of mythic-religious-philosophical material it insisted on incorporating into its plot—but highly skilled at the small one, the moment to moment business of telling an exciting story. Rendered insignificant ... were the particulars of what they had done on the island." David Zurawik of the Baltimore Sun gave the episode a highly negative review, writing "If this is supposed to be such a smart and wise show, unlike anything else on network TV (blah, blah, blah), why such a wimpy, phony, quasi-religious, white-light, huggy-bear ending. ... Once Jack stepped into the church it looked like he was walking into a Hollywood wrap party without food or music—just a bunch of actors grinning idiotically for 10 minutes and hugging one another."

=== Ratings ===
Lost aired on the American Broadcasting Company (ABC) from September 22, 2004, to May 23, 2010. The pilot episode had 18.6 million viewers, easily winning its 9:00 pm timeslot, and giving ABC its strongest ratings since 2000, when Who Wants to Be a Millionaire? was initially aired—beaten only the following month by the premiere of Desperate Housewives. According to Variety, "ABC sure could use a breakout drama success, as it hasn't had a real hit since The Practice. Lost represents the network's best start for a drama with 18- to 49-year-olds since Once and Again in 1999, and in total viewers since Murder One in 1995."

For its first season, Lost averaged 16 million viewers, ranking 14th in viewership among prime-time shows and 15th among the eighteen to forty-nine-year-old demographic. Its second season fared equally well: again, Lost ranked 14th in viewership, with an average of 15.5 million viewers. However, it improved its rating with 18- to 49-year-olds, ranking eighth. The second-season premiere was even more viewed than the first, pulling in over 23 million viewers and setting a series record. The third-season premiere brought in 18.8 million viewers. The seventh episode of the season, back from a three-month hiatus, saw a drop to 14.5 million. Over the course of the spring season, ratings would plunge to as low as 11 million viewers before recovering to near 14 million for the season finale. The ratings drop was partially explained when Nielsen released DVR ratings, showing Lost as the most recorded series on television. However, despite overall ratings losses, Lost still won its hour in the crucial 18–49 demographic and put out the highest 18–49 numbers in the 10:00 p.m. time slot ahead of any show on any network that season. The fourth-season premiere saw an increase from the previous episode to 16.1 million viewers, though by the eighth episode, viewers had decreased to a series low of 11.461 million. A survey of 20 countries by Informa Telecoms and Media in 2006 concluded that Lost was the second most popular TV show in those countries, after CSI: Miami. The sixth-season premiere was the first to climb in the ratings year-over-year since the second season, drawing 12.1 million viewers.

Lost : U.S. viewers per episode (millions)

Season	Episode number																									Average
Season	1	2	3	4	5	6	7	8	9	10	11	12	13	14	15	16	17	18	19	20	21	22	23	24	25	Average
1	18.65	17.00	16.54	18.16	16.82	16.83	18.73	18.44	17.64	17.15	18.88	21.59	20.81	19.69	19.48	17.88	19.49	18.85	17.75	17.12	17.20	17.10	18.62	20.71	20.71	18.39
2	23.47	23.17	22.38	21.67	21.38	20.01	21.87	19.29	21.54	20.56	19.13	19.05	18.74	18.20	16.43	16.06	16.21	16.38	15.68	15.56	16.35	14.67	17.84	17.84	–	18.90
3	18.82	16.89	16.31	17.09	16.07	17.15	14.49	12.84	12.95	12.78	12.45	12.48	12.22	11.52	11.66	12.09	12.08	11.86	12.33	12.11	12.32	13.86	13.86	–		13.75
4	16.14	15.29	13.76	13.65	12.89	13.01	12.08	11.46	12.08	10.73	10.78	10.96	12.30	12.30	–											12.67
5	11.35	11.35	11.23	11.01	9.82	11.41	10.05	10.65	9.40	9.04	9.57	8.57	9.23	9.04	8.70	9.43	9.43	–								9.96
6	12.09	12.09	11.05	9.82	9.95	9.29	9.49	8.87	9.31	10.13	9.55	9.48	9.53	9.59	10.32	10.47	13.57	13.57	–							10.85

Audience measurement performed by Nielsen Media Research

Lost gained renewed popularity after becoming available on streaming platforms like Hulu and Netflix. Nielsen Media Research, which records streaming viewership on U.S. television screens, estimated that the series was watched for 678 million minutes from July 29 to August 4, 2024. It later accumulated 1.03 billion minutes of watch time from October 21–27, 2024.

=== Awards and nominations ===
Capping its successful first season, Lost won the Emmy Award for Outstanding Drama Series and J. J. Abrams was awarded an Emmy in September 2005 for his work as the director of "Pilot". Terry O'Quinn and Naveen Andrews were nominated in the Outstanding Supporting Actor in a Drama Series category. Lost swept the guild awards in 2005, winning the Writers Guild of America Awards 2005 for Outstanding Achievement in Writing for a Dramatic Television Series, the 2005 Producers Guild Award for Best Production, the 2005 Director's Guild Award for Best Direction of a Dramatic Television Program, and the 2005 Screen Actors Guild Awards for Best Ensemble Cast.

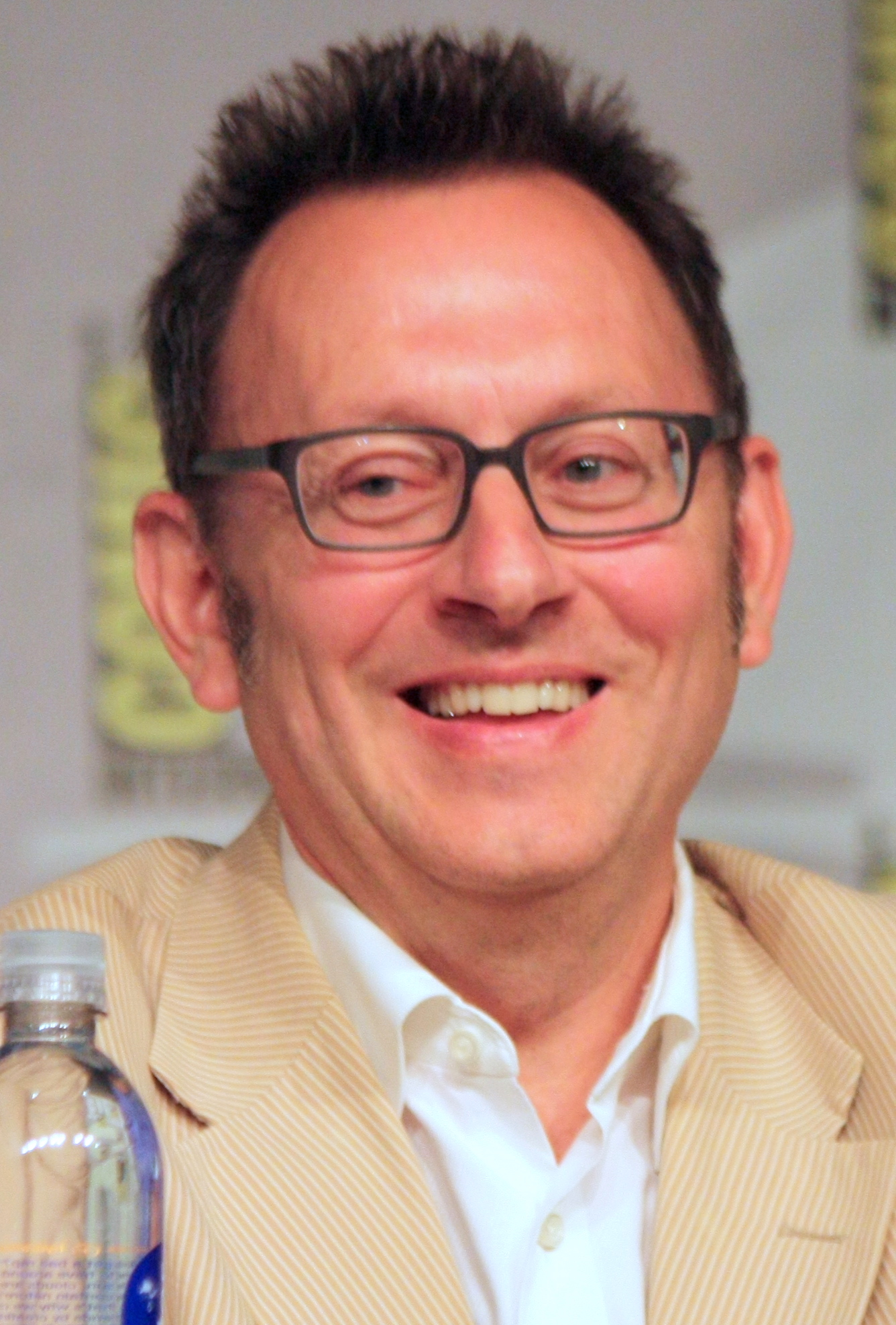
For his portrayal of Ben Linus, Michael Emerson received many awards and nominations, including winning a Primetime Emmy Award for Outstanding Supporting Actor in a Drama Series in 2009.

It was nominated for a Golden Globe Award for Best Television Drama Series three times (2005–2007), and it won the award in 2006. In 2006, Matthew Fox and Naveen Andrews received Golden Globe nominations for Best Lead Actor in a Drama Series and Best Supporting Actor respectively, and in 2007, Evangeline Lilly received a nomination for Best Actress in a Television Drama Series. Lost was nominated for the 2005 British Academy of Film and Television Award for Best International. In 2006, Jorge Garcia and Michelle Rodriguez took home ALMA Awards for Best Supporting Actor and Actress, respectively, in a Television Series. It won the Saturn Award for Best Television Series in both 2005 and 2006. In 2005, Terry O'Quinn won a Saturn Award for Best Supporting Actor in a television series, and in 2006, Matthew Fox won for Best Lead Actor. Lost won consecutive Television Critics Association Awards for Outstanding Achievement in Drama, for both its first and second seasons. Consecutively as well, it won in 2005 and 2006 the Visual Effects Society Award for Outstanding Supporting Visual Effects in a Broadcast Program. Malcolm David Kelley won a Young Artist Award for his performance as Walt in 2006.

In 2005, Lost was voted Entertainment Weekly's Entertainer of the Year. The show won a 2005 Prism Award for Charlie's drug storyline in the episodes "Pilot", "House of the Rising Sun", and "The Moth". In 2007, Lost was listed as one of Time magazine's "100 Best TV Shows of All-TIME". The series was nominated for but did not win a Writers Guild Award and Producers Guild Award again in 2007. In June 2007, Lost beat out over 20 nominated television shows from countries all over the globe to win the Best Drama award at the Monte Carlo Television Festival. In September 2007, both Michael Emerson and Terry O'Quinn were nominated for an Emmy Award for Outstanding Supporting Actor in a Drama Series, the award going to O'Quinn. Lost was again nominated for Outstanding Drama Series at the 60th Primetime Emmy Awards in 2008. The show also garnered seven other Emmy nominations, including Outstanding Supporting Actor in a Drama Series for Michael Emerson. It won a Peabody Award in 2008. In 2009, Lost was again nominated for Outstanding Drama Series, as well Outstanding Supporting Actor in a Drama Series for Michael Emerson at the 61st Primetime Emmy Awards, of which the latter won.

In 2010, the sixth and final season was nominated for twelve Emmy Awards at the 62nd Primetime Emmy Awards, including Outstanding Drama Series; Outstanding Writing for a Drama Series, for Carlton Cuse and Damon Lindelof for the show's series finale, "The End"; Outstanding Lead Actor in a Drama Series, for Matthew Fox; Outstanding Supporting Actor in a Drama Series, for Michael Emerson and Terry O'Quinn; and Outstanding Guest Actress in a Drama Series, for Elizabeth Mitchell. It won only one Emmy (Outstanding Single-Camera Picture Editing) out of its twelve nominations for a series total of 11 wins and 55 nominations in its six-year run.

In 2010, Kristin dos Santos of E! Online ranked Lost the best television series of the past twenty years. In 2013, the Writers Guild of America ranked Lost No. 27 in its list of the 101 Best Written TV Series of All Time. In 2014, the series was nominated for the TCA Heritage Award. In 2016, Rolling Stone ranked it the fourteenth best science fiction television show ever.

=== Fandom and popular culture ===
As a mainstream cult television show, Lost has generated a dedicated international fan community. Lost fans, sometimes dubbed Lostaways or Losties, have gathered at San Diego Comic-Con and conventions organized by ABC but have also been active in developing fan websites, including Lostpedia and forums dedicated to the program and its related incarnations. The show's fansites have focused on speculation and theorizing about the island's mysteries, as well producing fan fiction and videos, compiling episode transcripts, shipping characters, and collecting memorabilia.

Anticipating fan interest and trying to keep its audience engrossed, ABC embarked on various cross-media endeavors, often using new media. Fans of Lost have been able to explore ABC-produced tie-in websites, tie-in novels, an official forum sponsored by the creative team behind Lost ("The Fuselage"), "mobisodes", podcasts by the producers, an official magazine, and an alternate reality game (ARG) "The Lost Experience." An official fanclub was launched in the summer of 2005 through Creation Entertainment.

Due to the show's popularity, references to it and elements from its story have appeared in parody and popular culture usage. These include appearances on television, such as on the series Fringe, Will & Grace, Curb Your Enthusiasm, 30 Rock, Scrubs, Modern Family, Orange Is the New Black, Community, The Office, Family Guy, American Dad!, The Simpsons, Futurama, Late Night with Jimmy Fallon (under the sketch parody title "Late"), and The Venture Bros.. Lost is also featured as an Easter egg in several video games, including Dead Island, Half-Life 2: Episode Two, Fallout 3, World of Warcraft, Just Cause 2, Batman: Arkham City, Grand Theft Auto V, and Singularity. Similarly, several songs have been published whose themes and titles were derived from the series, such as Moneen ("Don't Ever Tell Locke What He Can't Do"), Veil of Maya ("Namaste"), Cosmo Jarvis ("Lost"), Senses Fail ("Lost and Found" and "All the Best Cowboys Have Daddy Issues"), Gatsbys American Dream ("You All Everybody" and "Station 5: The Pearl"), and Punchline ("Roller Coaster Smoke"). Weezer named their eighth studio album Hurley after the character, with a photo of actor Jorge Garcia on the cover.

After the episode "Numbers" aired on March 2, 2005, numerous people used the eponymous figures (4, 8, 15, 16, 23, and 42) as lottery entries. According to the Pittsburgh Tribune-Review, within three days, the numbers were tried over 500 times by local players. By October 2005, thousands had tried them for the multi-state Powerball lottery. A study of the Quebec Lottery showed that the sequence was the third most popular choice of numbers for lottery players, behind only the arithmetic sequences 1–2–3–4–5–6 and 7–14–21–28–35–42. The issue came to attention after a Mega Millions drawing for a near-record US$380,000,000 jackpot on January 4, 2011, drew a series of numbers in which the three lowest numbers (4–8–15) and the mega ball (42) matched four of the six numbers. The No. 42 is also the "Mega Number" in Hurley's "Mega Lotto" ticket. The players who played Hurley's exact combination won $150 each (or $118 in California).

=== Influence ===
Lost has been cited as a key influence on several of its contemporaries. The ABC series FlashForward was heavily compared to Lost, because of its similar use of nonlinear narrative and mysteries. The NBC series Heroes drew comparisons to Lost during its run, because of some similarities such as its ensemble cast. Damon Lindelof was involved in the early stages of the creative process of Heroes, as he was friends with Heroes creator Tim Kring. Ever since its premiere, The 100 has been compared to Lost because of its similar setting and the importance of survival in its story. The TBS comedy Wrecked has been defined as a parody of Lost, because of its very similar premise and multiple references to the drama.

Adam Horowitz and Edward Kitsis, former writers of Lost, created the fantasy series Once Upon a Time, which has also been compared to Lost. Even though their series started after Lost ended, they conceived it in 2004. Damon Lindelof was involved in the development of their series. Despite the comparisons and similarities to Lost, the writers intended the shows to be very different from each other. To them, Lost concerned itself with redemption, while Once Upon a Time is about hope. As a nod to the ties between the production teams of Once Upon a Time and Lost, the former show contains allusions to Lost. For example, many items found in the Lost universe, such as Apollo candy bars, Oceanic Airlines, Ajira Airways, the TV series Exposé and MacCutcheon Whisky can be seen in Once Upon a Time.

Both during and after Lost's run on ABC, its success led to dozens of new shows attempting to enter the same "mystery-driven sci-fi" genre as networks sought to cater to viewers' evolved affinity and demonstrated loyalty to this specific subset of drama. In 2018, NBC introduced Manifest, a show about the mysterious disappearance of a commercial passenger jet. While the show's preview and pilot alone sparked media coverage highlighting the show's central mystery to be seemingly the same as that of Lost, subsequent seasons have furthered controversy around the extent of key similarities. Noted parallels include the passengers' collective experience of displacement in spacetime, the acquisition of supernatural abilities and medical phenomena post-disappearance, the use of flashback/flashforward sequences to expose dark secrets harbored by passengers, the revelation of unusually high levels of interconnectedness between the lives of passengers, the polarized beliefs held by passengers regarding science versus faith as a means to explain their shared experience in different ways. Season 4 of Manifest reveals a plot twist suggesting the passengers were in some way chosen, prompting critics to point out this same key plot twist introducing predestination was featured in Lost.

=== Getting Lost ===
An independent documentary film about the development and cultural impact of Lost titled Getting Lost premiered on September 22, 2024, which marked the 20th anniversary of the original series' premiere. The film is directed by Taylor Morden and features interviews with the cast and crew of the show, along with members of the fan community. It also addresses the allegations of a toxic work environment that were revealed in 2023 during the film's production.

Canadian movie theater chain Cineplex held screenings of Getting Lost in theaters on November 3 and 6, 2024.

== Distribution ==
=== Online ===
In addition to traditional terrestrial and satellite television, Lost is available from various online subscription services, including Amazon Prime Video, Hulu, on Disney+ outside of the US via Star and on Netflix. It was one of the first series issued through Apple's iTunes Store beginning in October 2005. On August 29, 2007, Lost became one of the first TV programs available for download in the UK iTunes Store.

In April 2006, Disney announced that Lost would be available for free online in streaming format, with advertising, on ABC's website, as part of a two-month experiment of future distribution strategies. The trial, which ran from May to June 2006, caused a stir among network affiliates who were afraid of being cut out of advertising revenue. The streaming of Lost episodes direct from ABC's website was only available to viewers in the United States due to international licensing agreements. In 2009, Lost was named the most-watched show on the Internet based on viewers of episodes on ABC's website. The Nielsen Company reported that 1.425 million unique viewers have watched at least one episode on ABC's website.

=== Home media ===
The first season of Lost was released under the title Lost: The Complete First Season as a widescreen seven-disc Region 1 DVD box set on September 6, 2005, two weeks before the premiere of the second season. It was distributed by Buena Vista Home Entertainment. In addition to all the episodes that had been aired, it included several DVD extras, such as episode commentaries, behind-the-scenes footage and making-of features as well as deleted scenes, deleted flashback scenarios, and a blooper reel. The same set was released on November 30, 2005, in Region 4. The season was first released split into two parts: the first twelve episodes of season 1 were available as a widescreen four-disc Region 2 DVD box set on October 31, 2005, while the remaining thirteen episodes of season 1 were released on January 16, 2006. The DVD features available on the Region 1 release were likewise split over the two box sets. The first two seasons were released separately on Blu-ray Disc on June 16, 2009.

The second season was released under the title Lost: The Complete Second Season – The Extended Experience as a widescreen seven-disc Region 1 DVD box set on September 5, 2006. The sets include several DVD extras, including behind the scenes footage, deleted scenes, and a "Lost Connections" chart, which shows how all of the characters on the island are inter-connected. Again, the season was initially delivered in two sets for Region 2: the first twelve episodes were released as a widescreen four-disc DVD box set on July 17, 2006, while the remaining episodes of season 2 were released as a four-disc DVD box set on October 2, 2006. The set was released in Region 4 on October 4, 2006.

The third season was released under the title Lost: The Complete Third Season – The Unexplored Experience on DVD and Blu-ray in Region 1 on December 11, 2007. As with seasons 1 and 2, the third season release includes audio commentaries with the cast and crew, bonus featurettes, deleted scenes, and bloopers. The third season was released in Region 2 solely on DVD on October 22, 2007, though this time, only as a complete set, unlike previous seasons.

The fourth season was released as Lost: The Complete Fourth Season – The Expanded Experience in Region 1 on December 9, 2008, on both DVD and Blu-ray Disc. It was released on DVD in Region 2 on October 20, 2008. The set includes audio commentaries, deleted scenes, bloopers, and bonus featurettes.

The first three seasons of Lost have sold successfully on DVD. The season 1 box set entered the DVD sales chart at number two in September 2005, and the season 2 box set entered the DVD sales chart at the number one position in its first week of release in September 2006, believed to be the second TV-DVD ever to enter the chart at the top spot. The season 3 box set sold over 1,000,000 copies in three weeks.

Both the season 6 box set and the complete series collection contained a 12-minute epilogue-like bonus feature called "The New Man in Charge". The season 6 DVD set entered the DVD sales chart at the number one position in its first week of release in September 2010 boasting strong sales in the DVD and Blu-ray format for the regular season set as well as for the series box set.

== Other media ==
The characters and setting of Lost have appeared in several official tie-ins outside of the television broadcast, including in print, on the Internet, and in short videos for mobile phones. Three novelizations have been released by Hyperion Books, a publisher owned by Disney, ABC's parent company. They are Endangered Species (ISBN 0-7868-9090-8) and Secret Identity (ISBN 0-7868-9091-6) both by Cathy Hapka and Signs of Life (ISBN 0-7868-9092-4) by Frank Thompson. Additionally, Hyperion published a metafictional book titled Bad Twin (ISBN 1-4013-0276-9), written by Laurence Shames, and credited to fictitious author "Gary Troup", who ABC's marketing department claimed was a passenger on Oceanic Flight 815.

Several unofficial books relating to the show have also been published. Finding Lost: The Unofficial Guide (ISBN 1-55022-743-2) by Nikki Stafford and published by ECW Press is a book detailing the show for fans and those new to the show. What Can Be Found in Lost? (ISBN 0-7369-2121-4) by John Ankerberg and Dillon Burrough, published by Harvest House is the first book dedicated to an investigation of the spiritual themes of the series from a Christian perspective. Living Lost: Why We're All Stuck on the Island (ISBN 1-891053-02-7) by J. Wood, published by the Garett County Press, is the first work of cultural criticism based on the series. The book explores the show's strange engagement with the contemporary experiences of war, (mis)information, and terrorism and argues that the audience functions as a character in the narrative. The author also writes a blog column during the second part of the third season for Powell's Books. Each post discusses the previous episode's literary, historical, philosophical, and narrative connections.

The show's networks and producers have made extensive use of the Internet in expanding the background of the story. For example, during the first season, a fictional diary by an unseen survivor called "Janelle Granger" was presented on the ABC web site for the series. Likewise, a tie-in website about the fictional Oceanic Airlines appeared during the first season, which included several Easter eggs and clues about the show. Another tie-in website was launched after the airing of "Orientation" about the Hanso Foundation. In the UK, the interactive back-stories of several characters were included in "Lost Untold", a section of Channel 4's Lost website. Similarly, beginning in November 2005, ABC produced an official podcast, hosted by series writers and executive producers Damon Lindelof and Carlton Cuse. The podcast typically features a discussion about the weekly episode, interviews with cast members, and questions from viewers. Sky1 also hosted a podcast presented by Iain Lee on their website, which analyzed each episode after it aired in the United Kingdom.

The foray into the online realm culminated in the Lost Experience, an Internet-based alternate reality game produced by Channel 7 (Australia), ABC (America), and Channel Four (UK), which began in early May 2006. The game presents a five-phase parallel storyline, primarily involving the Hanso Foundation.

Short mini-episodes ("mobisodes") called the Lost Video Diaries were scheduled for viewing by Verizon Wireless subscribers via its V-Cast system but were delayed by contract disputes. The mobisodes were renamed Lost: Missing Pieces and aired from November 7, 2007, to January 28, 2008.

=== Licensed merchandise ===
In addition to tie-in novels, several other products based on the series, such as toys and games, have been licensed for release. A video game, Lost: Via Domus, was released to average reviews, developed by Ubisoft, for game consoles and home computers, while Gameloft released Lost: The Mobile Game for mobile phones and iPods. Cardinal Games released a Lost board game on August 7, 2006. TDC Games created a series of four 1000-piece jigsaw puzzles ("The Hatch", "The Numbers", "The Others", and "Before the Crash"), which, when put together, reveal embedded clues to the overall mythology of Lost. Inkworks has published three sets of Lost trading cards, Season One, Season Two, and Revelations. In May 2006, McFarlane Toys announced recurring lines of character action figures and released the first series in November 2006, with the second series being released July 2007. Furthermore, ABC sold a myriad of Lost merchandise in their online store, including clothing, jewelry, and other collectibles. In October 2010, DK Publishing released a 400-page reference titled The Lost Encyclopedia, written by Tara Bennett and Paul Terry. The book compiled information from the TV show producers "writers bible", listing nearly every character, chronological event, location, and plot detail of the series, filling in the gaps for die-hard fans.
