= List of Nancy Drew (2019 TV series) episodes =

Nancy Drew is an American mystery drama television series based on the series of mystery novels about the titular character, that premiered on October 9, 2019. The series was adapted for The CW by Noga Landau, Josh Schwartz and Stephanie Savage, and is produced by CBS Studios, in association with Fake Empire. On March 22, 2022, The CW renewed the series for a fourth and final season which premiered on May 31, 2023. The series ended on August 23, 2023.

During the course of the series, 62 episodes of Nancy Drew aired over four seasons, between October 9, 2019, and August 23, 2023.

== Series overview ==
Season	Episodes	Originally released	
Season	Episodes	First released	Last released
1	18	October 9, 2019	April 15, 2020
2	18	January 20, 2021	June 2, 2021
3	13	October 8, 2021	January 28, 2022
4	13	May 31, 2023	August 23, 2023

== Episodes ==
=== Season 1 (2019–20) ===
No. overall	No. in season	Title	Directed by	Written by	Original release date	U.S. viewers (millions)
1	1	"Pilot"	Larry Teng	Teleplay by : Noga Landau & Josh Schwartz & Stephanie Savage; Television Story by : Noga Landau	October 9, 2019	1.18
In the fictional town of Horseshoe Bay, Maine, retired teenage detective Nancy Drew is spending her gap year working as a waitress at The Bayside Claw while she deals with the grief of her mother Katherine's death. All that changes when one night, she and her co-workers George, Bess, and Ace discover the body of Tiffany Hudson, wife of local businessman Ryan Hudson. When the police chief tries to pin the murder on Nancy, whom he's despised for years, she breaks into Ryan's house looking for evidence and finds a locket hidden in a secret compartment. The locket contains a reference to Lucy Sable, a girl who was killed nineteen years ago; Nancy, Bess, and George hire a medium to contact Lucy's spirit and receive a cryptic message to "find the dress". Nancy discovers that her father is secretly dating a cop, Karen Hart, and that her boyfriend Nick served time after Tiffany testified against him in court. She decides to try and figure out who killed Tiffany, with Bess, George, and Nick among her potential suspects. That night, while investigating in the attic, she finds Lucy's bloodstained dress in a locked chest.
2	2	"The Secret of the Old Morgue"	Larry Teng	Noga Landau	October 16, 2019	0.80
In an effort to improve his public image, Ryan takes part in the town's annual Seawater Festival, in which a bucket of seawater is placed outside to determine whether someone will die in the coming year. Nancy learns that the Hudson family has arranged for Tiffany's body to be moved out of town, so she decides to break into the morgue and take some blood to be analyzed. She also spies on George, learning of her secret relationship with Ryan. George angrily refuses to help, blaming Nancy for her reputation as a "slut" in high school. Bess and Ace pretend to have car trouble to delay Ryan's transporter Lisbeth, who hits it off with Bess. Nancy retrieves the blood and some evidence connected to Lucy's case, but accidentally trips the alarm; George suddenly arrives and hides the goods while Nancy is arrested. Carson agrees to represent Ryan in order to afford his daughter's bail. He tells her that Nick couldn't have known Tiffany's identity since she testified behind a screen. Later that night, he secretly burns Lucy's dress on the beach. George discovers that her bucket of seawater has turned to blood, a warning that death is soon to follow.
3	3	"The Curse of the Dark Storm"	John Kretchmer	Jesse Stern & Lisa Bao	October 23, 2019	0.81
Nancy discovers evidence of a secret friendship between Tiffany and Nick. He explains that she had been visiting him every week up until his release and left him an old clock in Nancy's mother's roadster. Karen informs Nancy that the charges against her will be dropped if she helps build a case against Nick. George is nearly killed by several "accidents", and receives a visit from a woman named Rita who turns out to have died several decades earlier. Nick and Nancy follow Tiffany's clues to Lilac Inn, and find a hidden vault containing a lockbox. Carson finds a print on Nancy's shoe matching one she left behind at the inn. Nancy reveals the details of Tiffany's relationship to Karen so that Nick will not be treated as a suspect. Nick confesses to the group that he really did kill someone by accident, and finds $5 million in bearer bonds in the lockbox, money that Nancy believes Tiffany left for him. Ace calls her to pick up Bess, who turns out to be living in a van by herself. Nancy invites her to move in, and while helping her pack, she finds Tiffany's diamond ring in Bess' coat pocket.
4	4	"The Haunted Ring"	Larry Teng	Céline Geiger	October 30, 2019	0.69
Looking into Bess' past, Nancy finds a passport under the name "Bess Turani" with her picture. Bess turns out to be an English girl who believes the Marvins are her biological relatives, but isn't entirely sure. On the day of Tiffany's funeral, a ghost attacks Bess in the Claw's walk-in, prompting the girls to turn to George's clairvoyant mother Victoria who explains how to perform a ritual that will seal Tiffany's ghost away for good. Tiffany's sister, Laura Tandy, arrives in town seeking to learn the truth behind her death and recruits Ace, her ex-boyfriend, to help. At the funeral, George manages to only complete part of the ritual due to Bess wandering away from her post. Laura upstages Ryan's father Everett's eulogy by playing Tiffany's last 911 call and announcing her intentions to seek justice. Carson subsequently informs the media that Tiffany's autopsy report is inconclusive, angering Ryan. That night, Ned learns from a hidden camera that Laura broke into his garage, and Nancy follows a clue left by a ghost to Keene High School, turning up a photo of Lucy with Karen. The ritual's failure leads to Tiffany's spirit possessing George's body.
5	5	"The Case of the Wayward Spirit"	Claudia Yarmy	Melinda Hsu Taylor & Katherine DiSavino	November 6, 2019	0.62
Under the influence of Tiffany's spirit, George's behavior becomes increasingly unpredictable. Victoria warns the group that unless a ritual of exorcism is performed, she will eventually consume George's life force, erasing her forever. Local developer Owen Marvin hires the Bayside Claw to provide catering services to a local charity gala, but Bess asks Nick to go in her place to avoid having to deal with her family. While at the gala, Nancy runs into Karen, who reveals Lucy died a year after abruptly ending their friendship. Ryan has an argument with Owen, which George witnesses; Tiffany takes over, steals a dress and knife, and goes to confront him. Victoria and Bess arrive, and despite Laura disrupting the ritual, are able to banish her. Ace and Nick force Laura to return the flash drive she stole. Using a code word given to him by Tiffany in her final moments, Nick breaks the password on the drive and finds a mountain of evidence compiled against the Hudsons, including a possible connection to Owen. Owen helps Nancy find a time capsule buried by Lucy's high school class, including a video of her with a teenaged Ryan.
6	6	"The Mystery of Blackwood Lodge"	Amanda Row	Alex Taub & Andrea Thornton Bolden	November 13, 2019	0.73
A desperate Ryan comes to Nancy for help. In exchange for agreeing to steal a collection of priceless Roman coins for him from an auction at the Velvet Masque club, Nancy forces Ryan to escort her inside the club, normally off-limits to locals. Bess and Lisbeth have their first date, but when Lisbeth leaves early, Bess is devastated. To cheer her up, George brings her along on a mission with Nick to infiltrate the club; the two had earlier deduced that the coins were linked to the sinking of a cargo ship that killed Owen's uncle and plan to steal them to expose the Hudsons for their alleged involvement. Owen seeks the coins for the same reason and manages to get the group kicked out before winning the auction. Nancy discovers that Ryan's parents had Carson, their family's personal attorney in 1999, get rid of Lucy to keep her away from their son and to cover up her discovery of an affair between Owen's uncle and Ryan's mother, Celia Hudson. Lisbeth gives Bess a make-up date, and they kiss. Nancy reveals to Owen that she swiped the coins and declines his offer of dinner, unaware that Nick suspects she is going behind his back.
7	7	"The Tale of the Fallen Sea Queen"	Rebecca Rodriguez	Erika Harrison & Katie Schwartz	November 20, 2019	0.73
Victoria warns the group to dispose of the coins, as they attract evil spirits. Instead, Nancy decides to use them in a séance to contact Lucy's spirit so she can finally answer several long-simmering questions. Laura openly accuses Chief McGinnis of covering up Tiffany's death, forcing him to hand the case over to state authorities. Ace begins to suspect that Laura may be Tiffany's killer after learning that she stands to inherit her sister's money, but Nancy discovers his secret arrangement with McGinnis, shattering their trust. Nancy's contact informs her that the evidence she sent to him for analysis has disappeared, so she tracks down Lucy's half-brother to obtain the only other item that can be used to summon her, a bracelet she wore before her death. Victoria is too drunk to help, so the group conducts the séance themselves, destroying the coins in the process. Nick breaks up with Nancy afterwards for pushing him away. An unknown spirit is shown communicating with George's younger sister Ted. Ace leaves town with Laura and gets in a serious car accident, while Nancy deals with her growing fear that her father killed Lucy.
8	8	"The Path of Shadows"	Alexis Ostrander	Jesse Stern	December 4, 2019	0.68
Ace is brought to the hospital and falls into a coma. Nancy speaks to Chief McGinnis, and after revealing all of her and her friends' interactions with the spirit world, learns that Ace's spirit has separated from his body due to the trauma of the crash. McGinnis gathers Nancy, George, and Carson to form a spirit circle and send George to the spirit world. Based on Nancy's deduction that someone intentionally tampered with Laura's car to trigger the crash, Nick and Bess confront Lisbeth, who they think may be responsible. Lisbeth then comes clean: she is actually an undercover state police officer investigating the Hudsons. George is unable to find Ace's spirit due to the negative energy between Nancy and Carson, so Nancy clears it by making him promise to reveal everything once the ceremony is finished. George finds Ace's spirit in the form of a young boy, but he remains in a coma. Nancy uses a clue George found to expose Officer Rawley, the dirty cop responsible for the accident. Nancy and Lisbeth stage a confrontation so Lisbeth can maintain her cover. When George goes to pick up Ted from the diner, she finds her missing.
9	9	"The Hidden Staircase"	Shannon Kohli	Melinda Hsu Taylor	December 11, 2019	0.74
Ted's disappearance reveals similarities between her abduction and that of Rose Turnbull, the girl Nancy rescued in her first case as a 12-year old detective. Based on this, Nancy suspects that whoever took Ted is tied to Nathan Gomber, Rose's abductor. Nancy and Carson visit Gomber's old warehouse while George and Nick work on deciphering a note passed by Gomber to his only visitor, Moira Baker. Nancy realizes that there are gaps in her memory from the night she found Rose--the result, she believes, of an entity called Simon who was manipulating Gomber. George finds a location for Moira's antique store and breaks in with Nick at the same time that Nancy finds the shrine Gomber built for Simon and burns it; Moira is caught and Ted is located by Nick. When Nancy goes to see Gomber one last time, he says that his business with Simon is far from over. Bess reveals her secret to Owen. Karen finds Nancy's journal, and informs Chief McGinnis, who has the knife from Lucy's death tested. The fingerprints on it are found to match Carson's, and he is arrested and charged with her murder.
10	10	"The Mark of the Poisoner's Pearl"	Sydney Freeland	Katherine DiSavino & Lisa Bao	January 15, 2020	0.66
Nancy receives word from a contact that Tiffany was killed with a rare type of poison. Owen meets Bess and confirms that they are first cousins, making her a biological Marvin. He asks her for the burial coins as part of a plan to expose Everett Hudson for murdering their uncle, but when Nick explains that they were destroyed, Bess concocts a scheme to use Ryan, who is increasingly estranged from his family, as a means to find other potential evidence. Nancy's investigation leads her to an old case involving a serial poisoner from nearly seventeen years earlier. Ace takes her to his father, who worked on the case and gives Nancy clues indicating that the killer is still in Horseshoe Bay. Nancy makes a video daring the killer to come after her; the killer then lures her into a makeshift gas chamber from which Nick and George rescue her only seconds before death. Ryan decides to take matters into his own hands out of fear that his family will go after the Marvins. Ace turns the killer over to the police, and Nancy decides to call her father for the first time in two weeks, with Lucy's ghost looking on.
11	11	"The Phantom of Bonny Scot"	Ramsey Nickell	Andrea Thornton Bolden & Katie Schwartz	January 22, 2020	0.54
Everett and Nancy make a deal: If she sabotages Owen's efforts to expose his family's wrongdoing, he'll help get her father released from custody. George's friend Dawn informs her that the Bayside Claw is being put on the market, meaning she'll lose the only place she truly considers home unless she can come up with some quick money. Bess decides to embrace her British heritage for her first lunch with Diana Marvin; impressed, Diana asks her to join the Marvin corporate empire by meeting with a potential new partner, Amaya Alston. Owen introduces Nancy to Bashiir, the only survivor of the Bonny Scot. She discovers that Bashiir is haunted by his survivor's guilt, but is unwilling to come forward out of fear of deportation. With Owen's help, Nancy arranges a sting led by Lisbeth to take Everett into custody. She also finds files in the Hudson family mansion suggesting that Lucy's mother had something to do with her death. Nick tells George he'll use some of his bonds to buy the Claw, with her as co-owner. Owen makes arrangements to help Bashiir. Celia Hudson contacts someone at the state prison, ordering them to kill Carson.
12	12	"The Lady of Larkspur Lane"	Greg Beeman	Erika Harrison	January 29, 2020	0.63
Nancy takes George and Nick on an attempt to break into Larkspur Lane, the local asylum where Lucy's mother Patrice has been living since her death. There, they discover an infestation of strange mold, swarms of bugs, and a man named Sal who claims that the building is haunted by the spirits of the family who died there in the 1870s. Carson is nearly stabbed in prison before Ace is able to fake a transfer request; he takes Carson to his own home and contacts Karen for help when the police show up. Bess impresses Amaya with her wit and clever observations. With no evidence to prove Carson's life is in danger, Bess cuts a deal with Ryan, offering to grant him a favor from the Marvin family in exchange. Ryan's evidence, coupled with a call from Amaya, is enough to get Carson released from jail before he's tried. Nancy finds Patrice, who shows signs of dementia and tells her to find "the thin man's book". Sal directs her to the Whisper Box, where the family's possessions are kept, but then pulls the fire alarm. Nancy is left trapped inside the Whisper Box and falls into a deep sleep, waking up in a fantasy world where her mother is alive.
13	13	"The Whisper Box"	Larry Teng	Noga Landau & Alex Taub	February 5, 2020	0.62
With Sal's help, Nick and the others break into the asylum and try to communicate with an unconscious Nancy. Realizing that she's trapped in a fantasy, Nancy recruits the imaginary versions of her friends to help find a way out. From Ryan, they receive a puzzle that Nancy supposedly set up for herself, which leads to a graveyard and a mysterious key. The key turns out, however, to be a red herring; Nancy discovers that the real way out is through a letter written by her late mother. Despite being tempted to stay and make up for all of her life's regrets, she decides to give it up and returns to the real world. The group escapes as the asylum burns down, and Nancy is reunited with her father. Having found a keycard, she visits the local Historical Society and learns that it opens a lockbox placed there by Tiffany. Inside, she finds a recording of a video made several months earlier, where Tiffany reveals that someone has been following her before a ghost suddenly appears and the video is cut short. Nancy realizes that Tiffany was likely killed for trying to uncover who murdered Lucy Sable.
14	14	"The Sign of the Uninvited Guest"	Amanda Row	Katherine DiSavino	February 26, 2020	0.59
Patrice breaks into the Claw, and her son Joshua, Lucy's brother, comes by to pick her up. Laura returns to collect her inheritance, and asks Ace to move with her to Paris. Nancy moves ahead with her plan to find out who really killed Lucy by having Ace hack her old email account, which turns up messages between her and Ryan that reveal they were supposed to meet the night she died. Bess becomes concerned that Amaya has a romantic interest in her, which George tells her to break off. Nancy brings the group, Laura, Karen, and Ryan to the diner, where she has them reenact the events leading up to Tiffany's murder. The reenactment leads to a major breakthrough: a poisoned salad that was prepared for Ryan was instead served to Tiffany. Nancy takes this as evidence that the murder was revenge for Ryan killing Lucy; Ryan flees after he sees Lucy's ghost. Nancy visits Joshua to check Lucy's old computer, but quickly deduces he poisoned the salad. When he tries to kill her, he accidentally electrocutes himself. Ace ends things with Laura before she leaves. When the police arrive, Joshua is gone.
15	15	"The Terror of Horseshoe Bay"	Katie Eastridge	Jen Vestuto & Melissa Marlette	March 4, 2020	0.61
As the police gear up to find Joshua, Nancy learns she has one day left before her father's evidentiary hearing. She and Owen speak to Ryan's old roommate for information on him and Lucy. Nick and Ace visit Ace's father, who has come out of retirement to rejoin the force, and learn that the poison used to kill Tiffany was stolen from police evidence. Nancy correctly deduces that Joshua had an accomplice: Karen. Despite her arrest, however, Carson informs her he needs actual physical evidence to clear his name. Owen, George, and Bess go the Historical Society and conduct research on the Aglaeca, a spirit that supposedly grants the heart's desire of whoever summons it, but for a price. The group performs the summoning ritual, and the Aglaeca grants Nancy's wish by delivering her Lucy's bones. In return, it attempts to claim Owen's life, forcing George to break the summoning wreath. Ace stashes the bones, Nick accepts George's offer to spend the night at her home, and Owen and Nancy sleep together. The next day, Nancy coughs up the torn wreath, indicating that the Aglaeca is displeased with her refusal to honor the deal.
16	16	"The Haunting of Nancy Drew"	Ruben Garcia	Noga Landau & Katie Schwartz	March 11, 2020	0.67
Nancy brings in her forensic scientist friend to analyze Lucy's bones while she continues her search for the evidence to clear Carson's name. During the tests, Det. Abe Tamura, Karen's replacement on the force, arrives with a warrant to search the diner. Nick and George manage to hide the bones in time, but the experience causes friction between them. Nancy picks up Ryan and takes him along with her as she questions several witnesses, including Everett and Karen, to try and piece together Lucy's final hours. They visit her childhood home and find her diary hidden in the walls. When Nancy has to testify at her father's trial, she reveals the truth: Lucy committed suicide out of despair when Everett forced her to end things with Ryan. Carson is cleared of all charges. While cleaning the diner, George and Nick give into their feelings and kiss. Bess finds one of the bones is missing, unaware that Det. Tamura found it. The scientist gives Nancy a revelation that she confirms with her father: Lucy killed herself only after giving him and his wife the baby she had with Ryan to raise as their own; Nancy is Lucy and Ryan's biological daughter.
17	17	"The Girl in the Locket"	Larry Teng	Melinda Hsu Taylor & Lisa Bao	April 8, 2020	0.55
The Aglaeca continues to inflict terrifying visions on the group, and Victoria informs them that they must perform another ritual to free themselves from its curse. The only problem is that for the ritual to work, Nancy must offer her both her blood and that of a blood relative. She tries to get Ryan to help by agreeing to assist him in his effort to learn about his missing child. However, when Ryan admits he doesn't want to help Owen, Nancy barrages him with insults and he angrily drives off without her. At Diana Marvin's birthday party, Bess is told that she will be expected to extract information from Lisbeth about her police work in exchange for her family's approval of their relationship. Ryan deduces the truth and confronts Nancy; she confesses that she doesn't want him to be her father. Ryan nevertheless holds up his end of the bargain and takes part in the ritual. Unfortunately, the visions only get worse. Nancy suggests, and Victoria confirms, that the Aglaeca was once a human who was wrongfully executed, and is now enraged and desires blood. When the group realizes Owen is missing, they find his bloody corpse in a bathtub.
18	18	"The Clue in the Captain's Painting"	Ramsey Nickell	Erika Harrison & Jesse Stern	April 15, 2020	0.49
Nancy and the Drew Crew throw themselves into solving Owen's murder, believing that the Aglaeca will soon come for them as well. When a séance intended to call Owen's spirit fails, Nancy and Ace visit the Historical Society and learn that the Aglaeca only comes after its victims in groups, meaning Owen was killed by a living human. Bess continues to struggle with both her love for Lisbeth and her desire to please her family by spying on her girlfriend. George finds she can't be intimate with Nick and confronts Ryan, making it clear that she blames him for taking advantage of her and twisting her idea of what love is. Lisbeth shares some evidence with Nancy that allows her to deduce that Joshua, her biological uncle, is Owen's murderer. She visits her grandmother and discovers that Joshua has been hiding in the nursing home; before he kills her, she reveals herself as his niece, causing him to slip and nearly fall to his death before Ace pulls him up. George finally decides that she can allow herself to be intimate again. The Aglaeca sends each of the Drew Crew a vision of how they will die: George and Nick drown, Ace is impaled on a meat hook, Bess burns to death, and Nancy dies the same way her birth mother did by falling off the cliff where she took her own life.

=== Season 2 (2021) ===
No. overall	No. in season	Title	Directed by	Written by	Original release date	U.S. viewers (millions)
19	1	"The Search for the Midnight Wraith"	Larry Teng	Noga Landau & Melinda Hsu Taylor	January 20, 2021	0.50
As the Drew Crew strategizes over how to deal with the Aglaeca's curse, Bess announces a reward for anyone who can provide information. At the same time, a girl named Amanda is found badly injured by the police, and Nancy comes under suspicion after Amanda mentions her name. The gang learns that Amanda and her brother Gil are in possession of a hand mirror stolen from the Hudson family that was used in the first summoning of the Aglaeca, and want to sell it to them. However, Gil has gone missing, allegedly at the hands of a forest-dwelling spirit known as the Gorham Wraith. The Drew Crew are able to find Gil (after an unpleasant run-in with Everett Hudson), but the Wraith traps them. Nancy discovers that it fears fire and burns it out of existence with a lighter. The police arrest her for possession of stolen property, but Ryan bails her out by claiming the mirror was a gift. By breaking the mirror's glass, the Drew Crew finds a message hidden underneath that reveals the key to defeating the Aglaeca can be found in a sea shanty.
20	2	"The Reunion of Lost Souls"	Eduardo Sanchez	Andrea Thornton Bolden	January 27, 2021	0.40
A historian informs the Drew Crew that the only preserved recording of the sea shanty is an old 45 vinyl record, last owned by Johnny Mac, a drunk killed in a hit-and-run in 1975. The group's pursuit of the record unintentionally attracts Johnny's vengeful spirit; he starts ambushing and attacking Nick, calling him "Buddy". Complicating matters further is the sudden arrival of Nick's mother Millie, who wants her son to return to his family home in Miami and questions his relationship with George. Nancy connects Mac to a group of other young men and women who made a deal with the Aglaeca back in the 70s, only to die in freak accidents on the same day. The Crew finds the record hidden in an old jukebox, and by playing it are able to banish Johnny's spirit before he kills Nick. George and Nick reconcile with Millie, who agrees to let her son stay in Maine. An analysis of the record reveals that the Aglaeca once named Odette Le Mar was the lover of Bess's ancestor, Douglas Marvin, who may have had a hand in her death.
21	3	"The Secret of Solitary Scribe"	Rachel Raimist	Alex Taub	February 3, 2021	0.46
Bess conducts research suggesting that it may be possible to undo the Aglaeca's curse by returning Lucy's bones to the sea. Nancy and Carson track down AJ Crane, a reclusive author of horror novels who happens to be the only survivor of the 1975 incident. Crane refuses to help, so Nancy steals a talisman hanging outside his house and has Hannah Gruen of the Historical Society identify it as a powerful charm that attracts malevolent spirits. Crane is arrested when he breaks into Nancy's house to retrieve it. Despite previously opposing Bess's idea of returning the bones, Nancy changes her mind, but the Aglaeca rejects the bones. Crane escapes custody and tries to burn Gruen alive, revealing that the deal he made was to save her life in 1975. Nancy talks him down and Crane, resigned to his fate, leaves to die in a tragic accident. The Crew ransack his house for tools to fight the Aglaeca. Nick and George sleep together for the first time. Nancy, Carson, and Ryan secretly bury Lucy's bones in the woods.
22	4	"The Fate of the Buried Treasure"	Larry Teng	Céline Geiger	February 10, 2021	0.46
With the deadline for the Aglaeca's revenge approaching fast, Nancy has Ace take Carson and Ryan to purchase a sacred dybbuk box which can supposedly trap the spirit. On the way back, Carson encourages Ryan to connect with his daughter. Nancy and Bess track down a necklace that once belonged to the Algeaca when it was alive, which was given by Douglas Marvin to his second wife, Agnes. Although Agnes was believed to have gone insane, Nancy learns that she was imprisoned by her husband when she learned the truth about his crime. The necklace is found based on a cypher Agnes wrote before her death, along with incriminating letters. George and Bess both struggle with the implications of their impending deaths, and both are forced to make peace with their fears. The Algeaca destroys the dybbuk box and rejects Nancy's heartfelt plea to spare them if they get justice for her death. With no other options, the Drew Crew decide that the only hope they have of cheating death is to kill the Aglaeca.
23	5	"The Drowned Woman"	Larry Teng	Noga Landau & Melinda Hsu Taylor	February 17, 2021	0.43
One day before their deaths, the Drew Crew plan to use themselves as bait to kill the Aglaeca, weaponizing the sand from their portents. Desperate, Nancy turns to Hannah at the Historical Society, where a worried Carson and Ryan follow her. Nancy finds sand from Ryan's car and divides it for the Drew Crew. Despite surviving, the angered spirit sends a new death vision. Out of options, they spend their final hours resolving unfinished business; Ace contacts his brother in witness protection, Nick gives Tiffany's flash drive to Ryan to take down his family and Nancy forgives Carson. His words help Nancy realize to appeal to who the Aglaeca once was; Odette. The Drew Crew recites the love letters she wrote to an English woman which returns the Aglaeca back to Odette, until an explosion happens; leaving George impaled by a harpoon. She dies in Nick's arms and a distraught Nancy steals a shroud from Hannah that can resurrect her. She opens up the lock boxes and Hannah warns her about the consequences. The shroud revives George and they celebrate, until George realizes Odette is still present and Nancy discovers the lock boxes she opened unleashed more spirits into town.
24	6	"The Riddle of the Broken Doll"	Larry Teng	Erika Harrison & Andrea Thornton Bolden	February 24, 2021	0.53
Two weeks after the Aglacea, Nancy encounters a corpse whose body parts are sewn together at the morgue she's working at for community service. Detective Tamura dismisses her and she returns home to find the body. The Drew Crew arrive, performing an autopsy and find insects inside. The coroner Connor and his son Leo arrive to retrieve it until Nancy realizes the corpse is alive. After rescuing them, Hannah Gruen discovers that it's a lamia, which preys on humans from a lock box key at the house the body was found in. The box belonged to one of the Women in White, who performed a ritual to separate the lamia from its vessel after twelve children were killed. Since Nancy broke the security system at the Historical Society, the lamia was freed. The Drew Crew determines its victims are the lamia's weakness when Charles, the ghost of a victim, inhabits Leo's toy. The lamia bewitches George's sisters until Nancy performs the ritual aided by the spirits of the twelve children, defeating the lamia. Connor covers up the truth from Tamura, Nancy agrees to be Carson's investigator and George discovers Odette is possessing her.
25	7	"The Legend of the Murder Hotel"	Roxanne Benjamin	Katherine DiSavino	March 10, 2021	0.52
Three volleyball players haze their new recruit, Jen, by sending her into a haunted room in Breaker Hotel. When Jen disappears, they ask Nancy for help. Nancy learns about the room's supernatural origins. George fails trying to exorcise Odette. Nick's worrying Ryan possibly let Everett know he's onto him, leading Ryan to turn to Carson. If Everett finds out, he'd be cut off and leave the company to Nancy. Ryan fears Everett will kill her before she dismantles the company. George, Bess and Nancy find a secret door in the room, deducing Jen must've escaped, realizing the haunted room is fake. Ace asks Amanda Bobbsey, working at the hotel, for camera footage of the door. The girls watch Jen climbing out and George as Odette helping her, revealing her possession. They track her down during the disappearance and Nancy finds Jen at a bus station, convincing her to return after expressing their own identity crises. Nancy almost fills out a college application to Columbia, George asks Bess to keep Odette possessing her from Nick, Ryan accepts a job from Everett to keep Nancy safe. Ace flirts with Amanda but encounters a man claiming to be Bess's husband searching for her.
26	8	"The Quest for the Spider Sapphire"	Roxanne Benjamin	Lisa Bao	March 17, 2021	0.41
One year ago in Manchester, Bess escapes a man, Stephen, by planting counterfeit money on him and alerting airport security, arresting him. She flees to Horseshoe Bay. Present day she prepares for the Marvin Hunt & Roast until Ace confronts her over her marriage to Stephen, at the hotel searching for her. George and Nancy search for the previous owner of the shroud that saved her, R. Jenkins. Ryan readies for perceptive reporter Valentina Samuels's interview. Stephen threatens to tell Diana Marvin about Bess's criminal past unless she steals an heirloom, the Spider Sapphire. Bess comes clean to Diana Marvin and reassures her place in the family. Nick introduces Grant, the new cook for Ace to show around. George and Nancy discover that Jenkins died the same night George was resurrected. If someone uses the shroud again, George will die. It also puts nearby spirits into the survivor; explaining Odette inhabiting George. They get kidnapped by Stephen, pressuring Bess to choose between her friends and the Marvins. Bess steals the sapphire for Stephen. Ace and Nick rescue the girls. Diana exiles Bess, knowing she stole the sapphire. Stephen planted it back, knowing Bess would be abandoned again, just like her mother did. The Drew Crew forgive and comfort her. Nancy deduces that if Jenkins went clinically insane with the spirits, the same thing will happen to George with Odette. Valentina decides to stay, suspicious of Ryan. George finally reveals Odette's possession to Nick and at the Claw, the lockers are found broken into; the shroud missing.
27	9	"The Bargain of the Blood Shroud"	Amanda Row	Alex Taub	March 24, 2021	0.42
Carson tries to help Bess out of her funk from being exiled out of the Marvins while Ace joins Nancy, Nick and George to figure out who might've taken the shroud. They find out Gil took it after Amanda told him learning from Ace. Gil reveals he will use the shroud on a comatose Eddie Collins who he believes killed his mother, Rosemary and does not care that George will die if he uses it. Nancy makes a deal that she will solve Rosemary's murder without the shroud if he gives it to her. Gil agrees but gives her until six o'clock. Ace gives Nick and George a list of hiding spots the shroud might be in from Amanda. They find the Bobbsey's baby book and the numbers of Amanda and Gil's baby weights. At Collins' house, Nancy and Gil discover a basement filled with paintings of his mother. Gil, convinced Collins was obsessed with her, leaves to get the shroud while Nancy notices a ghost in the background of the paintings and a key to a locked box. Nancy and Ace head to an art gallery, finding out that the ghost in the painting is the same one carved into a tree near where Rosemary was last seen. Under the painting is another painting of what Rosemary would look like today and the numbers in the signature match Amanda and Gil's baby weights, which Nancy reveals to Gil when she finds him at Collins' house ready to use the shroud. Rosemary was in Eddie's group therapy and he allowed her to paint in his house to calm her from the monster she was convinced was following her, which she depicted in her paintings. Finding out she's still alive, Gil gives the shroud back and Nick shares his doubts about managing Odette in George's body with Bess and find George missing. They find her at the edge of a cliff as Odette and Nick and Bess convince her they will find a way to make it work and Odette reluctantly agrees and returns as George. Ace warns Nancy about Gil, not trusting him and Nancy points out the irony of him dating his twin sister. Ace tells Amanda where to find her mother in Santa Fe and they kiss, until Ace gets a text from his half-brother from witness protection.
28	10	"The Spell of the Burning Bride"	Amanda Row	Jesse Stern	March 31, 2021	0.38
When a bouquet from a flower shop is stolen, Nancy and Tamura work together, deducing that the thief is responsible for three break ins and only takes one thing from each location. Ryan has an interview with Valentina Samuels, who takes a straw from Nancy's drink for a DNA sample. George allows Odette to take control and let her experience life and she asks Bess to be her chaperone ice skating with Ace. Nancy researches the gown the thief is wearing, holding suppressed lust and whoever wears it is possessed by the last ghost who wore it, a murderous bride. Nick discovers it's someone helping him install a security system at the Historical Society. At the interview photoshoot with Celia, Valentina gets a hair sample from Ryan. Ace confides in Bess that his mother doesn't know his father was guarding a woman in witness protection, his half-brother's mother and Bess confesses she deflected her attraction towards Odette by drinking, getting them arrested. Nancy, Ace and Tamura save Nick and Nancy destroys the dress, releasing the lust onto her, driving her to become aroused by Ace, Nick, Gil and Tamura. They trap her and give her an antidote but she escapes, sharing a moment with Tamura. When the spell is broken, she maintains professionalism with him but hooks up with Gil. When Ace arrives to meet his brother, he doesn't come but leaves a box with a photo of their dad. Valentina meets Celia, who was paying her to investigate Ryan and reveals to her Nancy is her granddaughter, their samples matching.
29	11	"The Scourge of the Forgotten Rune"	Kristin Lehman	Katie Schwartz	April 7, 2021	0.63
Nick wakes up with no memories and tries to determine the reason behind his amnesia with the Drew Crew. They figure out where Nick was at the Historical Society before his memory loss where a tour guide, Aristotle was murdered. Bess advises Ace to ask his father about his brother. They find Nick's truck with the engine connected to a device that erases and returns memories. When they turn it on for Nick to remember, he gets them to leave when a creature stalks him before he turns the device on again. Nancy uses the device on Celia Hudson to prevent telling her husband Everett that she is their granddaughter. They deduce that Aristotle accidentally unleashed a god that murders everyone that knows its name. When they all find out its name, the monster goes after them and they erase all of their memories. They head back to the Claw where past versions of themselves left them information to defeat the monster. They repeatedly try and fail. The substance that erases their memory is running out, prompting them to make one final attempt and discover that the entity is less powerful when more people know its name. They restore their memories and Bess spreads its name "Grimathorn" through social media and Nick realizes Aristotle came to him for help until he was killed by the Grimathorn and he fled to erase his memory. Nick and George lure the monster away until it grows weaker into an idol and they lock it in an archive box. Nancy restores Celia's memories and asks to get Everett to trust her. Nick has been cleared of murder charges. Nick and George move into Carson's old loft and they celebrate. Grant, the new kitchen cook, shows up and tells Ace that he is his brother.
30	12	"The Trail of the Missing Witness"	Kristin Lehman	Jen Vestuto & Melissa Marlette	April 14, 2021	0.61
Grant reveals to Ace that his mother is being targeted within Wit-Sec by her former associate Daniel West. To save her, Nancy helps retrieve the evidence and exchange it with West for Ace who had been kidnapped by him. Nancy makes a deal with Celia to recover the evidence from West in exchange of retracting her statement against Everett. Meanwhile Odette has been writing love letters to Bess, who responds to them. George finds out that her sisters have met Odette. During the food festival, Nick tries to get evidence against Everett from a mole in the company, which show all contracts and statements to be in Ryan's name, who is clueless about them. The Bayside Claw wins the Chowder Bowl. Grant gets to briefly meet his father before being relocated by Wit-Sec.
31	13	"The Beacon of Moonstone Island"	Ruben Garcia	Céline Geiger	April 28, 2021	0.47
Nancy's reputation is on the line since she retracted her account of Everett Hudson and the Bonny Scot. In order to repair it, she takes on one of her father's cases and visits an abandoned island with Ace and Amanda Bobbsey, where they find a girl who's been missing for five years. Meanwhile, George is upset at Odette for messing with her things, so in revenge, she decides to hide Odette's love letters. Nick decides to open his building as a Youth Centre and Odette and Bess decide to carry on as friends.
32	14	"The Siege of the Unseen Specter"	Ramsey Nickell	Andrea Thornton Bolden & Lisa Bao	May 5, 2021	0.44
The night of her birthday Nancy is arrested for lying to law enforcement since she withdrew her testimony against Everett Hudson. George, Bess and Ace summon George's ancestor, her great aunt Mei who takes over Ace's body, to find Odette's past lover, Mary, among ghosts. They discover Mary moved on and isn't waiting for Odette. The police station is put on lockdown by a hacker called the Arbiter who wants justice for a dead black girl, Dolores Barrett. Nancy with the help of Nick, there for a meeting with Ryan for his youth center, goes over Dolores's last moments alive and makes a terrible discovery: Brandon Schmidt, a reporter, was having an affair with Dolores and harassed her the night she died, after that Mitzi called the police on her because of racism, Council Fraser, then police man, arrested her and assaulted her hitting her head, and Officer Hampton left her to die by brain hemorrhage in her cell, after Fraser threatened not help her. Nancy finally discovers the Arbiter was Reverend Carter. In the last scene the Drew Crew gathers at Nancy's house for her birthday but Nancy goes to her room and, while crying feeling guilty for withdrawing her statement, she decides to bring justice to Everett Hudson
33	15	"The Celestial Visitor"	Ruben Garcia	Melinda Hsu Taylor & Noga Landau & Cameron Johnson	May 12, 2021	0.46
A young and rich inventor, Tom Swift, seeks Nancy's help to find a meteorite that crashed into Horshoe Bay in 1929 and is now causing many catastrophes in town due to a comet passing by earth. The meteorite is kept in Icarus Hall, the property purchased by the "Icarans", a fraternal organization made of men who ended up murdering each other after inhaling a smoke, created by the Women in White. Nancy is invited by Celia to a party in Everett's honor, to introduce herself as his granddaughter. Finally, Ryan finds out about Val's actions, and Nick and George have a serious talk about showing each other in public This episode is a backdoor pilot for the spinoff series Tom Swift.
34	16	"The Purloined Keys"	Jeff W. Byrd	Jesse Stern & Katherine DiSavino	May 19, 2021	0.41
Everett asks Nancy to find out to whom Howard leaked information about him. Nick, Ryan and Val, though, find Howard dead in his hotel room and go visiting Bertram Bobbsey in prison to find out about where Everett hides "The Black Crown Tape", in which there's clear evidence of a murder Everett committed, the existence of which Howard was aware of. Ryan and Val fall into Everett's trap and are discovered to be the ones Howard leaked the information to, so Val has to leave town while Ryan decides to stay behind and fight his dad. At the party in Everett's honor Nancy discovers Celia's dead body, realizing just then that all day she had been talking with her ghost. Nancy thus gets into Everett's car, tasers him and kidnaps him. Finally Carson discovers deep scratches on Nancy's body in a distorted picture he took of her right before the party
35	17	"The Judgement of the Perilous Captive"	Jeff W. Byrd	Erika Harrison	May 26, 2021	0.39
36	18	"The Echo of Lost Tears"	Amanda Row	Noga Landau & Katie Schwartz	June 2, 2021	0.49
After unsuccessfully trying all night to get rid of the Wraith, the Drew Crew performs a ritual to discover when and how the entity was created. They go to New York to find the machine Temperance Hudson used and Nancy goes inside her own subconscious. There she has to pass some tests involving the most traumatized versions of herself: 12-year-old Nancy, Grieving Nancy, Dark Nancy and Newborn Nancy. In the end she manages to defeat the Wraith and survive. Meanwhile, Ryan gives up his rights as Nancy's father in Carson's favor and goes to live with them after Everett cuts him off; Nancy decides to announce the world she's a Hudson and take over Hudson Enterprises to give reparations to Everett's victims; Odette decides to never show up again and says goodbye to Bess; George asks Nick to marry her and Nancy goes to Ace's house to talk to him about her feelings for him but finds out he's on a road trip with Amanda. Finally, Temperance Hudson restores her youth using Nancy's blood

=== Season 3 (2021–22) ===
No. overall	No. in season	Title	Directed by	Written by	Original release date	U.S. viewers (millions)
37	1	"The Warning of the Frozen Heart"	Amanda Row	Noga Landau & Melinda Hsu Taylor	October 8, 2021	0.42
Nancy is looking forward to heading to Columbia but before she could learn about it, she finds a dead body on Hudson property. The dead body has a frozen heart. Ned and George get engaged before a new dead body with the same MO is found. Nancy is denied entrance into Columbia so she pours herself into her community by applying for community liaison. After the second murder, she is given the position.
38	2	"The Journey of the Dangerous Mind"	Amanda Row	Celine Geiger & Andrea Thornton Bolden	October 15, 2021	0.33
After the reveal that Temperance is in town, Nancy begins her first day as the community liaison to the police while investigating the crime with the help of her friends. In the course of the investigation, Nancy learns from Connor, the coroner, that the kills were different as the way the hearts were frozen. This causes Nick and Ace to learn that the killer must've used Argon gas to freeze the hearts. While her friends learned that information, Nancy arrives for her first day and learns that her position gives her a small table without a chair and meets the FBI consultant Agent Park. Temperance then arrives and offers Nancy her help which has her taking Nancy into her memory of the dead body by her car to find some information. After figuring out that it was a man with three fingers wearing a hat, similar to what she had seen previously at Temperance's home, she learns from Park that the M.O. was similar to a previous case. After the information tracks to a man named Richard Trott, Nancy headed to the real address and ends up stepping accidentally on an explosive. She is later saved by Park but this results in the evidence she found being made inadmissible. George spends the day looking for her missing ring, hiding the fact from Nick with the help of her sisters.
39	3	"The Testimony of the Executed Man"	Shannon Kohli	Jesse Stern	October 22, 2021	0.34
On the trail of the Frozen Hearts killer, Nancy and her friends follow a surprising lead from a podcaster at an annual convention for amateur sleuths, where they also find themselves unraveling ghostly clues about a homicide from the 1950s. At the convention, George learns that her sister made a site dedicated to her and she has fans. Ace is possessed by a dead ghost after keeping an item from a clue box.
40	4	"The Demon of Piper Beach"	Clara Aranovich	Erika Harrison & Katharine DiSavino	October 29, 2021	0.34
A new monster, The Sandman, is causing nightmares and sleepwalking that become dangerous and violent. Nancy, Ace, Nick and George risk dying in their sleep but Bess, despite being upset with the others for always dismissing her and never trusting her, saves them through a lucid dream, with Temperance's advice and Ryan's help. Finally, George decides to confront her estranged father, Nick hires Ryan at the youth center, Bess decides to form a new union of Women in White, Nancy's feelings for Ace become stronger after her dream about him, and Carson discovers Ace's involvement with Mr Bobbsey. In the end a new murder happens, revealing there's a second Frozen Heart Killer.
41	5	"The Vision of the Birchwood Prisoner"	Ruben Garcia	Melinda Hsu Taylor & Leilani Terrell	November 5, 2021	0.30
Nancy asks Temperance for help to get into Trott's memories and find details about the FHK: they discover a supernatural entity is behind the murders, but that results in Trott having a stroke. George has a deep talk with her long lost father but it leads to her and Nick having a fight. Ace gets into trouble after his involvement with Bobbsey and the police gets involved, which leads to his dad kicking him out of the house. Finally, Ace goes to live with Nick and Nancy fills the team in with her latest discoveries.
42	6	"The Myth of the Ensnared Hunter"	Ruben Garcia	Lisa Bao	November 12, 2021	0.33
The Drew Crew goes on the hunt for an underground prison that may hold answers to the Frozen Hearts killings - all while following a lead on a relic that could cure George of the paranormal affliction that's shortening her lifespan. Ace tries to enlist Amanda Bobbsey in bringing her father to justice.
43	7	"The Gambit of the Tangled Souls"	Larry Teng	Jen Vestuto & Melissa Marlette	November 19, 2021	0.35
When Ryan and Carson enter Bobbsey's storage locker to find a device to help George, they accidentally enhale a powder that causes them to act like teens. Meanwhile Bess has to cancel a date to help George and Odette. Afterwards, Carson approaches D.A. Jean Rosario and tells her about his feelings.
44	8	"The Burning of the Sorrows"	Larry Teng	Katie Schwartz	December 3, 2021	0.28
Ace and Ryan team up at the historical society for a haunting. In the woods near Temperance's home, Nancy, Bess, and Agent Park team up to try trapping the copperhead and end up unleashing an entity that feeds on people's sorrows. Nancy bonds with Agent Park as Temperance reveals about her daughter Charity and her husband.
45	9	"The Voices in the Frost"	Scott Wolf	Katherine DiSavino	December 10, 2021	0.29
Nancy and Agent Park team up to figure out where the last two pieces of Charity's soul is, heading to the Historical Society to talk to Charity's ghost. Ace realizes that he has feelings for Nancy. Bess begins snooping into Temprance after helping an old friend of Nick's. In the end Ace learns that Hannah is the one behind the phantom knocks due to the key they found.
46	10	"The Confession of the Long Night"	Jesse Ellis	Andrea Thornton Bolden	January 7, 2022	0.45
As Ace and Hannah are trapped in a parallel world, Ace wants to approach Nancy for help. Nancy and Agent Park begin to look into the connected relatives between the murder victims. Nick and George find a dead body behind the youth center. Ryan meets with an old friend at the Yacht club who is possibly connected to the dead body. Temperance hosts a ball where Bess wants to find out her true motives but it backfires on her.
47	11	"The Spellbound Juror"	Larry Teng	Céline Geiger	January 14, 2022	0.40
The Drew Team tries to figure out which of the remaining Gettysburg survivors might possibly house a piece of Charity's soul. Carson and A.D Rosario's case goes to court, with George lending a helping hand to gather evidence. Ace struggles with deciding to tell Nancy his true feelings, with Bess's encouragement. Nick spends the day in court as a juror for Carson's case, discovering the next victim of the Copperhead might be a juror. Ryan and Nancy discover new findings that reveal Temperance's real evil plans. Nancy and the Drew Team manage to figure out the next potential victim, saving him from the Copperhead. Ace finally tells Nancy he has feelings for her. Temperance kidnaps the victim.
48	12	"The Witch Tree Symbol"	Larry Teng	Erika Harrison	January 21, 2022	0.47
Beginning in a flashback from 1971, it shows the children of Fernwood orphanage and what really happened back in the past and how they disappeared. Back to the present, the Drew Team continue to investigate Temperance's master plan and how to defeat her. Nick and Bess deal with a critical situation regarding the Youth Center's kids, revealing what Nick has known for weeks: that the kids have been hexed by Temperance. Ace, Nancy and Agent Park discover Temperance's antler bones with engravings and figure out Temperance's plan. The team discovers that Ace is the last victim that houses Charity's soul.
49	13	"The Ransom of the Forsaken Soul"	Larry Teng	Noga Landau & Alex Taub	January 28, 2022	0.35
The Drew team decides to make a trade with Temperance in order to save Ace's life.

=== Season 4 (2023) ===
No. overall	No. in season	Title	Directed by	Written by	Original release date	U.S. viewers (millions)
50	1	"The Dilemma of the Lover's Curse"	Amanda Row	Noga Landau	May 31, 2023	0.39
Five weeks later, Nancy Drew Investigations is in full swing but Nancy still hasn't solved the mystery of the cemetery's missing bodies. Nancy confides in her dads about the curse Temperance put on Ace. Bess is embracing her role as the new Director of the Historical Society. Nancy and Ace make amends as Ace is arrested for stealing the bodies from the cemetery. A severed arm was recovered from Ace's parents' back yard. While out investigating, Nancy and Ned see a dead body rise from the dirt and walk away. The Glasses blackmail Ryan for an introduction to Bess with the hopes of monetizing some of the Historical Society's relics; which she declines. George ID's the owner of the severed arm as a rich, troubled girl named India. Nancy investigates the yacht where she was living and finds a notebook with scribbles. Ryan recognizes them and tells Nancy the scribbles are an outline of Horseshoe Bay. Nancy theorizes that the bodies are moving via the town lines. The Glasses sabotage Ryan's car and steal Bess's shipment. At the Lovers Ball, Nancy runs into Ace, who has made bail. They almost kiss and the glass in Nancy's hand breaks; another warning of Temperance's curse. The Drew Crew finds all the missing bodies as they converge in a clearing that intersects the town lines. The bodies all vomit blood and collapse, in front of the new Police Chief, who exonerates Ace. Later, the blood from the bodies move toward a Horseshoe Bay water reservoir. Ace confronts Nancy about her odd behavior and she finally admits to him they are cursed.
51	2	"The Maiden's Rage"	S. Lily Hui	Katie Schwartz & Leilani Terrell	June 7, 2023	0.47
Ace questions Nancy about the curse but she is reluctant to find a cure. Ned starts online dating. George's boss, Judge Abbott, collapses after drinking water she poured him. Before he collapses, Judge Abbott attempts to destroy a file and tells George to "avoid Magpie Lake." When investigating, some of the water gets on Nancy, who has a reaction of acting like a "bro." Nancy and Ace investigate Logan Rhodes, the subject of the case file Judge Abbott was trying to destroy. Logan reveals that "Magpie Lake" is actually the girl whose house Logan was trying to break into and that she fell and severely hit her head not too long later. They discover that a statue that used to belong to Maggie was found in Judge Abbott's office. Nancy feels like Ace rejects her and she attacks him. Desperate for a cure, Nancy asks Tristan for help obtaining a relic that his parents have that will cure her. After the relic works, Nancy vomits the same blood substance the dead bodies vomited before collapsing in the clearing. The Drew Crew theorizes the water has been tainted with a mind altering substance and Judge Abbott was purposely dosed as a result of his involvement in Logan Rhodes' case. Ace and Nancy interrogate Logan trying to get him to confess to attacking Maggie but are unsuccessful. Before leaving, they dose his water with the mind altering substance. Logan confesses that Judge Abbott covered up the truth by altering Maggie's medical records. Judge Abbott urges George to "leave it alone" which she declines to do. Nancy apologizes to Ace and tells him about the month she lived with him in Temperance's vision. George realizes there is something in the water in Horseshoe Bay.
52	3	"The Danger of the Hopeful Sigil"	Jem Garrard	Céline Geiger & Lauren Glover	June 14, 2023	0.40
Jessie and Birdie perform a ritual with a doll in front of a boy, Avery, to prove the supernatural exists. Avery, a skeptic, is possessed by a demon as a result. Earlier that day, Ace and Nancy borrow the doll from Darleen to use it to break the love curse. During a school field trip to the Historical Society, Jessie and Birdie try to convince the others that the supernatural exists but Bess shuts them down in front of their classmates, including Avery. The girls end up finding the doll and decide to do the ritual to prove they're right. After things go awry, they call Nancy for help. The Drew Crew is able to lure Avery to the Historical Society with the hopes of exorcising the demon but he abducts Jessie and Birdie instead. Finding all three possessed kids in the woods, the Drew Crew performs a ritual that exorcises the demon and consequently, breaks the doll, rendering it useless for breaking the love curse. However, Nancy discovers there is another doll and the Drew Crew gather everything they need for the ritual. The ritual is unsuccessful as they realize Temperance had already planned for it. Nick tries convincing the town council not to use the town's water source and use a neighboring town's reservoirs instead but the council decides against it. Ace tells Nancy that he would rather be friends instead of losing her to the curse and Nancy is heartbroken.
53	4	"The Return of the Killer's Hook"	Pascal Verschooris	Jen Vestuto & Melissa Marlette	June 21, 2023	0.36
After hearing screaming in the woods, Nancy stumbles onto a movie set. Laci, the podcaster Nancy met at DetectiveCon, is directing a remake of a slasher movie called Long Hook, which was originally set in Horseshoe Bay. Laci reveals the movie has been set back due to a variety of strange, unexplained occurrences. Nancy offers to investigate but Laci declines. However, after another unexplained occurrence on set, Laci allows Nancy to investigate. Nancy suspects Jim Stanley, the director of the original Long Hook, but after she learns he died almost thirty years ago, she suspects his ghost is haunting the set. While filming her scene in the movie, Bess is injured by a real hook, not a prop, further reinforcing Nancy's suspicion of Jim Stanley's ghost. Bess and Nancy perform a ritual to get rid of the ghost but immediately after, Laci is almost killed so Chief Lovett decides to halt filming until further notice. Nancy returns to set and realizes that the crew has been drinking the tainted water. Nancy suspects that Councilwoman Bree, a PA on the original movie, was somehow involved in Jim Stanley's death. Bree reveals the crew was tortured on set by Jim Stanley so they decided to get back at him by playing a prank on him but he accidentally drowned in a bathtub and died. Bree tells George and Nick that she could have saved Jim but she hated him so much that she didn't. The current film's crew, influenced by the water, attack Laci. Bess and Nancy are able to "pump the stomachs" of the crew and the effects of the water are reversed. Bree says that after Jim's death, she went to her father for help, who told her he visited the Black Door. After hearing Bree's story, the Drew Crew asks her to resign from Town Council and she reluctantly agrees. Laci survives her attack and resumes production on her movie. Ace finds out that Bree's father and Judge Abbott were friends, and both were involved in cover-ups.
54	5	"The Oracle of the Whispering Remains"	Scott Wolf	Lisa Bao & Lauriel Harte Marger	June 28, 2023	0.37
The Drew Crew starts investigating the eight bodies that were resurrected from the cemetery and Nancy finds a tooth with an occult symbol. George calls her father, Edwin Chen, for help. He tells them each mouth had 3 teeth with 3 different symbols on them and he's seen these symbols before in a back room in Clifton University. Nancy breaks in and finds the teeth on skulls that are over 500 years old. She discovers a photo of a decoder that reveals the engraving is Welsh and translates to - "that which killed us" and it was stolen years ago. They hire a relic hunter, which turns out to be Ryan, to recover the relic, called a Roundel. Despite Nancy's reluctance to involve her father, Ryan sets up a meeting with the current owner. Ace and Nick recruit Bess to help turn the water of Horseshoe Bay red so that people will not drink it and it works. Bess throws a Singles Ball as a fundraiser to help pay for George's college bills. George's father, Edwin, gives her a check for $30,000 to help with college which she decides to use to start a college fund for her sisters. Ryan meets the owner of the Roundel and they bond over a shared hatred of the Glasses. Nancy, George and Bess try using the Roundel but are seemingly unsuccessful. Later, the Roundel opens, revealing a compass inside that is pointing north. The Drew Crew follow the compass and see a creature emerge from the ground, and run off.
55	6	"The Web of Yesterdays"	Larry Teng	Alex Taub & Tiffany Patterson	July 5, 2023	0.38
Bess receives a cease and desist letter from a group called the Families for Truth and History. Nancy attends Career Day at the high school and ends up being transported to 1972 with Tristan. Tristan and Nancy are in different bodies, visible only to others, and are called Bobby and Stacey by the others in 1972. They decide to attend a party at Nancy's house but get nowhere so they try the Historical Society, only to find it hasn't been built yet. Elsewhere, Ace and Nick search for the missing ferret while George and Bess deal with the cease and desist letter. Finding the portal that takes them back, Tristan and Nancy attempt to go through but they are separated and only Tristan returns back to the present, leaving Nancy in 1972. Tristan enlists the Drew Crew to help Nancy. Bess shares that what they experienced is called a Ghost Web and is likely created by something to hunt. Bess and Tristan find an old newspaper article that reveals Stacey died at the prom in 1972. Bess opens a portal for Tristan to return to bring Nancy back and he successfully returns with her to the present. Later, Nancy starts vomiting blood and they theorize the Ghost Spider has laid eggs inside Nancy, which they are able to remove before it hatches. However, the sac bursts on the table and the spiders form together into one giant spider which Ace, with the help of Nick, manages to kill. George is arrested for breaking and entering but her charges are dismissed after Bess takes the blame for her. Ace finally catches the missing ferret. Tristan shows up at Nancy's house in a tux and they dance unaware that Ace is watching. Ace releases the ferret in the woods behind Nancy's house.
56	7	"The Reaping of Hollow Oak"	Adrian Diepold	Katie Schwartz & Hayley Muñoz	July 12, 2023	0.39
Bess leads a seance to talk to Bree's father, Ron, to ask him where the Black Door is but is unsuccessful. Suddenly, the game they were using to connect with Ron comes alive and they are all forced to play. Bess has to leave the game to give her statement at the police station. Nancy is furious when she figures out that Ace had the ferret and let it go. On George's turn, she must pass to the next player, which is Bess. Nick gets the station with the dice in time for Bess to roll but she is killed in the game and is eliminated. Ryan blackmails Chief Lovett into allowing Bess back into the Historical Society. Ace, Nancy and George eliminate themselves on purpose, which leaves Nick to fight the Grims alone. In the middle of the fight, Jade shows up and Nick explains his involvement in the supernatural to her. With her help, Nick defeats the Grim and takes the soul globe. Using the token they earned in the game to get the soul globe to work, they free the souls but can't connect with Ron. Nancy and Ace decide to give each other some space since they can't be together. Jade tells Nick that she is happy that he was finally open with her and they kiss. Bess receives a threat from the FFTH. Ron's ghost comes through and tells Nancy the Black Door is at Town Hall.
57	8	"The Crooked Bannister"	Larry Teng	Teleplay by : Jen Vestuto & Melissa Marlett; Story by : Sara Pearce	July 19, 2023	0.37
It's the anniversary of Nancy's mom's passing. Nancy is unable to find a black door at Town Hall. Nick decides to run for the open seat on the Town Council. Ace finds a police report where the suspect mentions the Black Door. Bess opens a box filled with relics and the Drew Crew all swap bodies. Ace and Nancy talk to Ace's dad about Jack Rea, the man who mentions the Black Door. Ace's dad reveals he arrested Rea at the Yacht Club so that is where they head to next. Nick (as George) goes on a study date with one of George's law classmates. George (as Bess) has to perform a ritual and Bess (as Nick) lobbies for a seat on Town Council. Ryan finds the other half of the relic needed for the Drew Crew to be returned to their bodies and it works. Nancy returns to the Yacht Club and finds the Black Door. Inside, there's a staircase that leads to a room with books and dead bodies. When Nancy reads an inscription on a mirror, the bodies all "come to life." The Drew Crew find out the monster is called the Sin Eater and is being protected by people aware of its existence. Nancy invites her friends over to celebrate her mom. Nick decides to turn down the spot on the Town Council and proposes a satellite location of the Historical Society that operates in secret to appease the FFTH.
58	9	"The Memory of the Stolen Soul"	Robin Givens	Lisa Bao & Tiffany Patterson	July 26, 2023	0.34
The Drew Crew think that if they can retrieve the first sin the mirror ever consumed, they can destroy the Sin Eater. Nancy and Nick try to see the first sin in the mirror but instead, see the founders of Horseshoe Bay and the creation of the Sin Eater. Bess decides to reveal the true mural in the court house which details an assault by the founders on the native people of Horseshoe Bay. Ace makes contact with a ghost haunting the morgue. Bess is cleared of all charges but is removed as Keeper of the Historical Society, which is turned over to Callie, the leader of FTTH. George breaks a coffee cup on purpose and confesses her "sin" to the mirror. Bess and Nick discover the Sin Eater is a person, not a monster as they originally thought. Nancy shoots the Sin Eater, who is Tristan.
59	10	"The Ballad of Lives Foregone"	Kristin Lehman	Lauriel Harte Marger & Hayley Muñoz	August 2, 2023	0.37
Tristan is severely wounded from Nancy's arrow but the Drew Crew try to save him. The Glasses tell the others they have been trying to find a cure for Tristan and that he is the reason they got into the relic trade to begin with. To cure Tristan, they need to find the last sin he consumed. Looking for a clue, Ryan and Shelby (Mrs. Glass) find a camera in the Black Door's room which leads them to an abandoned cabin with pictures of all the sinners. Nancy, Nick and Tristan go back into Tristan's memory to see if they can figure out the last sin but he comes back as one of his past lives, India, and continues to cycle through different lives/personalities. George, Carson and Jonas (Mr. Glass) locate and secure what they think is the last sin but it's not the right one. Nancy goes back into Tristan's subconscious to find the right one, which she does and Tristan is saved. Ace and Bess, with the help of the ghost haunting the morgue, help save the life of a hiker in the woods. The Glasses drug and kidnap Nancy since she was the last sinner and can be sacrificed to save Tristan.
60	11	"The Sinner's Sacrifice"	Melinda Hsu Taylor	Alex Taub & Leilani Terrell	August 9, 2023	0.39
Nancy begs Jonas to allow her to see her last sin since she can't remember it. Fully aware of what is going on with the Glasses, Ryan rescues Nancy. Ace spends more time with the ghost haunting the morgue. Judge Abbott visits George at work asking for her forgiveness and tells her that he will offer a sin to the Sin Eater to be the sacrifice. Shelby reveals to Nancy that she has a paralytic implant inside her body and that Nancy is expected to show up for the ritual or it will be used. Nancy attempts to connect with the ghost from the morgue so she can see her sin but is stopped by Ace. Jean tells Carson that she is pregnant. George stops Judge Abbott from sacrificing himself. Nancy gets a message from Tristan asking to meet, but it's really his parents, who trap her for the ritual. With the help of Callie, Nancy is rescued before the Sin Eater/Tristan kills her. Bess removes the paralytic implant from Nancy. Ace grows even closer to the ghost. Nancy continues to struggle with not knowing what she did and thinks that she, Ace and the ghost are all connected.
61	12	"The Heartbreak of Truth"	Kristin Lehman	Celine Geiger	August 16, 2023	0.40
Nick is contemplating selling The Claw but George is against it. Nancy and Ace meet with a fisherman who tells them that he saw a boat catch fire the same night Ace was night fishing with his dad. Ace finds out the ghost's name is Alice and that she worked as a boat captain. Tristan and the Drew Crew destroy the mummy that calls to the Sin Eater to eat sins, hoping that will stop Tristan from having to transform. The town celebrates Beltane despite the Chief's objections. George tells Nick that she's ready to sell The Claw to help pay for law school. Nancy and Ace finally see their sin - a fire started on the boat, trapping Alice, while at the same time, Ace's dad falls overboard. Ace chooses to save his dad instead of Alice. After, Ace calls Nancy and thinking that she is helping Ace, she goes to the Sin Eater. When Ace finds out what Nancy did, he is enraged. Ace tells Alice the truth and she crosses over. Red asks Ryan leave with her and when he says no, she decides to stay with him. Callie uses the sin water as an aerosol to infect the town.
62	13	"The Light Between Lives"	Amanda Row	Noga Landau & Melinda Hsu Taylor & Lauren Glover	August 23, 2023	0.35
The Drew Crew take refuge in the Historical Society and work on figuring out how to help the town. They try to do a ritual but Nancy is affected. They theorize that Nancy and Tristan's souls are entangled from their past lives, which is why the ritual doesn't work. Bess performs the disentanglement ritual as some of the townspeople set fire to the Historical Society. Tristan is able to channel his soul's energy to cure the town and has been cured himself. Bess tells Nancy and Ace that their souls were damaged during the ritual so they will not be able to reincarnate; this life will be their last one. George shares with the others that she is going to law school in Seattle, Nick accepted an engineering position in Atlanta and is moving there with Jade, and Bess plans on traveling the world to replenish the lost artifacts from the Historical Society's fire. Nancy plans on tracking down all the sins she's spread throughout the country as a way to make amends while Ace plans on going to college to major in pre-med to become a medical examiner. The death curse was broken during the ritual so Ace and Nancy can finally be together. The Drew Crew come together at The Claw to say one last goodbye.

== Ratings ==
=== Season 1 ===
Viewership and ratings per episode of List of Nancy Drew (2019 TV series) episodes
No.	Title	Air date	Rating/share (18–49)	Viewers (millions)	DVR (18–49)	DVR viewers (millions)	Total (18–49)	Total viewers (millions)
1	"Pilot"	October 9, 2019	0.3/2	1.18	0.3	0.97	0.6	2.14
2	"The Secret of the Old Morgue"	October 16, 2019	0.2/1	0.80	0.2	0.73	0.4	1.53
3	"The Curse of the Dark Storm"	October 23, 2019	0.2/1	0.81	0.2	0.64	0.4	1.45
4	"The Haunted Ring"	October 30, 2019	0.1/1	0.69	0.3	0.68	0.4	1.36
5	"The Case of the Wayward Spirit"	November 6, 2019	0.1/1	0.62	0.3	0.58	0.4	1.20
6	"The Mystery of Blackwood Lodge"	November 13, 2019	0.2/1	0.73	0.2	0.63	0.4	1.36
7	"The Tale of the Fallen Sea Queen"	November 20, 2019	0.2/1	0.73	0.2	0.55	0.4	1.28
8	"The Path of Shadows"	December 4, 2019	0.2/1	0.68	0.2	0.55	0.4	1.23
9	"The Hidden Staircase"	December 11, 2019	0.1/1	0.74	0.2	0.50	0.3	1.24
10	"The Mark of the Poisoner's Pearl"	January 15, 2020	0.1/1	0.66	0.1	0.52	0.2	1.18
11	"The Phantom of Bonny Scot"	January 22, 2020	0.1/1	0.54	0.1	0.50	0.2	1.04
12	"The Lady of Larkspur Lane"	January 29, 2020	0.1/1	0.63	0.1	0.50	0.2	1.13
13	"The Whisper Box"	February 5, 2020	0.1	0.62	0.2	0.46	0.3	1.08
14	"The Sign of the Uninvited Guest"	February 26, 2020	0.1	0.59	0.1	0.49	0.2	1.08
15	"The Terror of Horseshoe Bay"	March 4, 2020	0.1	0.61	0.2	0.56	0.3	1.17
16	"The Haunting of Nancy Drew"	March 11, 2020	0.1	0.67	0.2	0.47	0.3	1.14
17	"The Girl in the Locket"	April 8, 2020	0.1	0.55	0.1	0.38	0.2	0.93
18	"The Clue in the Captain's Painting"	April 15, 2020	0.1	0.49	0.1	0.45	0.2	0.94

=== Season 2 ===
Viewership and ratings per episode of List of Nancy Drew (2019 TV series) episodes
No.	Title	Air date	Rating (18–49)	Viewers (millions)	DVR (18–49)	DVR viewers (millions)	Total (18–49)	Total viewers (millions)
1	"The Search for the Midnight Wraith"	January 20, 2021	0.1	0.50	0.1	0.27	0.2	0.77 (Note: Live+7 ratings were not available, so Live+3 ratings have been used instead.)
2	"The Reunion of Lost Souls"	January 27, 2021	0.1	0.40	—N/a	—N/a	—N/a	—N/a
3	"The Secret of Solitary Scribe"	February 3, 2021	0.1	0.46	0.1	0.34	0.2	0.80
4	"The Fate of the Buried Treasure"	February 10, 2021	0.1	0.46	—N/a	—N/a	—N/a	—N/a
5	"The Drowned Woman"	February 17, 2021	0.1	0.43	—N/a	—N/a	—N/a	—N/a
6	"The Riddle of the Broken Doll"	February 24, 2021	0.1	0.53	—N/a	—N/a	—N/a	—N/a
7	"The Legend of the Murder Hotel"	March 10, 2021	0.1	0.52	—N/a	—N/a	—N/a	—N/a
8	"The Quest for the Spider Sapphire"	March 17, 2021	0.1	0.41	—N/a	—N/a	—N/a	—N/a
9	"The Bargain of the Blood Shroud"	March 24, 2021	0.1	0.42	—N/a	—N/a	—N/a	—N/a
10	"The Spell of the Burning Bride"	March 31, 2021	0.1	0.38	0.1	0.23	0.2	0.60
11	"The Scourge of the Forgotten Rune"	April 7, 2021	0.1	0.63	0.1	0.38	0.2	1.01
12	"The Trail of the Missing Witness"	April 14, 2021	0.1	0.61	0.1	0.42	0.2	1.03
13	"The Beacon of Moonstone Island"	April 28, 2021	0.1	0.47	0.1	0.37	0.2	0.86
14	"The Siege of the Unseen Specter"	May 5, 2021	0.1	0.44	0.1	0.38	0.2	0.82
15	"The Celestial Visitor"	May 12, 2021	0.1	0.46	0.1	0.41	0.2	0.87
16	"The Purloined Keys"	May 19, 2021	0.1	0.41	0.1	0.42	0.2	0.82
17	"The Judgement of the Perilous Captive"	May 26, 2021	0.1	0.39	0.1	0.43	0.2	0.82
18	"The Echo of Lost Tears"	June 2, 2021	0.1	0.49	0.1	0.51	0.2	0.99

=== Season 3 ===
Viewership and ratings per episode of List of Nancy Drew (2019 TV series) episodes
No.	Title	Air date	Rating (18–49)	Viewers (millions)	DVR (18–49)	DVR viewers (millions)	Total (18–49)	Total viewers (millions)
1	"The Warning of the Frozen Heart"	October 8, 2021	0.1	0.42	—N/a	—N/a	—N/a	—N/a
2	"The Journey of the Dangerous Mind"	October 15, 2021	0.1	0.33	—N/a	—N/a	—N/a	—N/a
3	"The Testimony of the Executed Man"	October 22, 2021	0.1	0.34	0.1	0.29	0.1	0.63
4	"The Demon of Piper Beach"	October 29, 2021	0.1	0.34	—N/a	—N/a	—N/a	—N/a
5	"The Vision of the Birchwood Prisoner"	November 5, 2021	0.0	0.30	—N/a	—N/a	—N/a	—N/a
6	"The Myth of the Ensnared Hunter"	November 12, 2021	0.0	0.33	—N/a	—N/a	—N/a	—N/a
7	"The Gambit of the Tangled Souls"	November 19, 2021	0.0	0.35	—N/a	—N/a	—N/a	—N/a
8	"The Burning of the Sorrows"	December 3, 2021	0.0	0.28	0.1	0.40	0.1	0.68
9	"The Voices in the Frost"	December 10, 2021	0.1	0.29	0.1	0.38	0.2	0.67

No DVR ratings are available after the ninth episode, or for the fourth season.
