= Skyline High School (Arizona) =

Public secondary school in Mesa, Maricopa County, Arizona

- Home of the Coyotes

Location
- 845 S. Crismon Rd. Mesa, Arizona 85208; United States

Information
- Type: Public secondary (U.S.)
- Motto: Creating a legacy of excellence
- Established: 1999
- School district: Mesa Public Schools
- NCES District ID: 0404970
- NCES School ID: 040497001830
- Principal: Gregory Mendez
- Teaching staff: 125.70 (FTE)
- Grades: 9-12
- Enrollment: 2,127 (2023-2024)
- Student to teacher ratio: 16.92
- Colors: Forest Green and Vegas Gold
- Mascot: Coyote
- Yearbook: Skybound
- Website: mpsaz.org/skyline
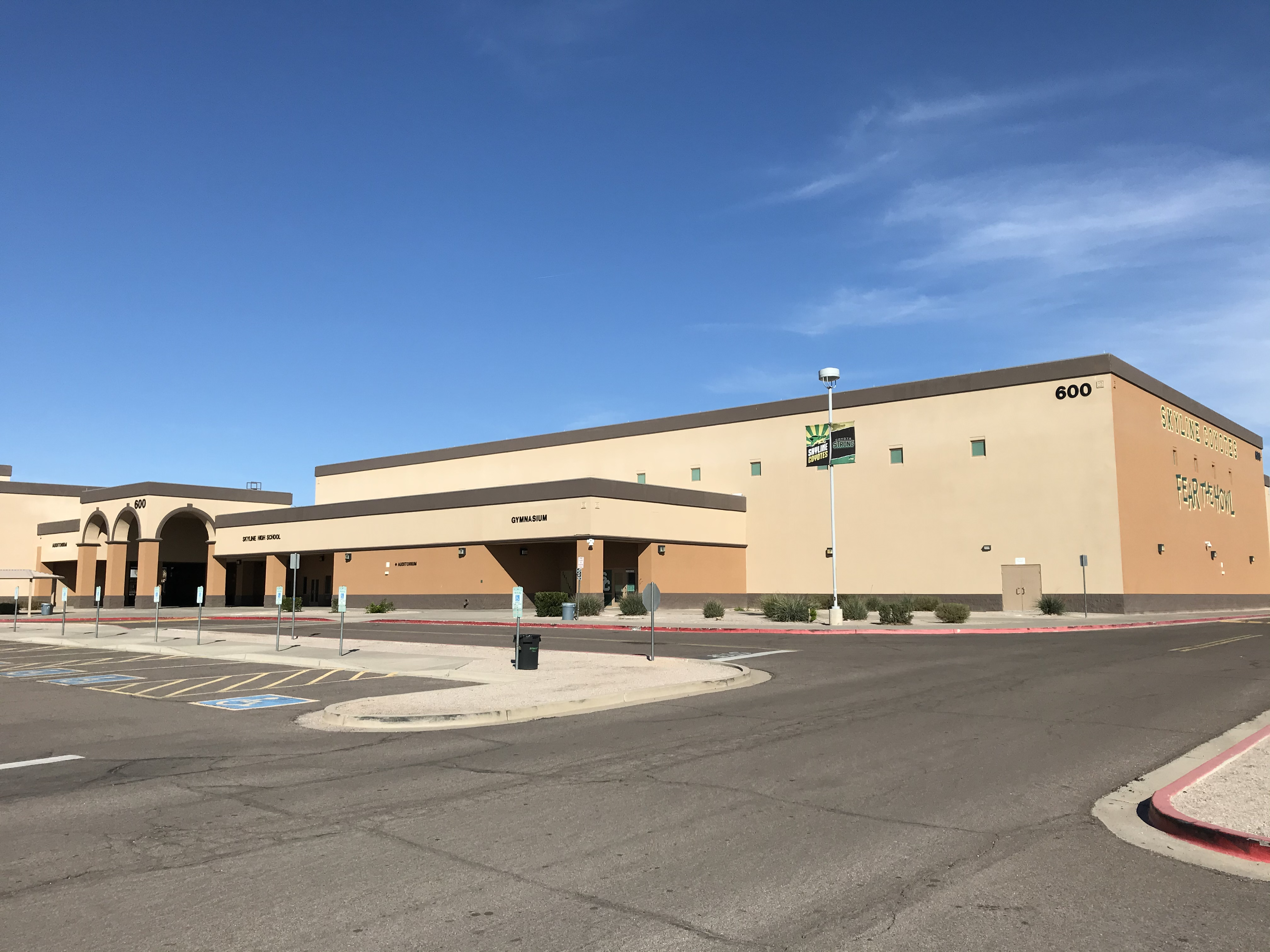
- Skyline High School

Skyline High School is a public high school in the eastern part of Mesa, Arizona. Skyline is the youngest of the six high schools located in the Mesa Unified School District. Skyline opened in 1999 and houses students in grades 9–12. Skyline High School is a four-year, public, comprehensive high school with an estimated enrollment of 2,400 students. The school is accredited by the North Central Association.

== Demographics ==
During the 2023-2024 school year, the demographic break of the 2,127 students enrolled was:

- Male – 52.3%
- Female – 47.7%
- Native American/Alaskan – 2.9%
- Asian – 1.2%
- Black – 3.9%
- Hispanic – 53.4%
- Native Hawaiian/Pacific Islander – 0.6%
- White – 35.6%
- Multiracial – 2.4%

== Athletics ==
- Badminton
- Baseball
- Cross Country
- Soccer
- Softball
- B/G Tennis
- B/G Golf
- B/G Track and Field
- B/G Volleyball
- B/G Basketball
- B/G Soccer
- Wrestling
- Swim and Dive
- Cheer
- JROTC
- Pom

== Basketball ==
Year	Coach	Record (League)	Playoffs
2004	Michael Wirth	4–20 (0–13)	No Appearance
2005	Mike Parillo	4–21 (0–3)	NA
2006	M. Wirth	6–21 (2–8)	at Red Mountain (L) 76–64
2007	M. Wirth	12–26 (1–7)	at Horizon (L) 73–49
2008	M. Wirth	17–12 (3–5)	NA
2009	M. Wirth	14–14 (4–8)	NA
2010	M. Wirth	11–14 (3–9)	NA
2011	M. Wirth	7–18 (0–14)	NA
2012	M. Wirth	7–17 (0–13)	NA
2013	Matthew Johnson	8–17 (1–11)	NA
2014	M. Johnson	12–14 (3–9)	NA
2015	James Capriotti	3–22 (1–7)	NA
2016	J. Capriotti	12–14 (2–8)	NA
2017	J. Capriotti	14–13 (4–6)	NA
2018	J. Capriotti	19–8 (7–3)	at Perry (L) 74–71 (OT)
2019	J. Capriotti	27–3 (10–0)	vs. Corona del Sol (W) 81–53 vs. Perry (W) 43–41 at Desert Vista (L) 63–44
2020	Mitch Armour	4–13 (3–7)	N/A
2021	M. Armour	1-22 (1-10)	N/A
2022	Cory Hoff	6-20 (1-9)	N/A
2023	Angel Ung	2-5 (0-0)	N/A

== Football ==
Year	Coach	Record (Section)	Playoffs
2004	Pete Jonovich	3–7 (0–6)	No Appearance
2005	P. Jonovich	3–7 (0–5)	NA
2006	P. Jonovich	2–10 (1–4)	NA
2007	P. Jonovich	7-4 (2–2)	vs. Westview (L) 35–23
2008	P. Jonovich	8–4–1 (2–2)	vs. La Joya Community (L) 50–28 vs. Marcos de Niza (L) 38–3
2009	P. Jonovich	2–9 (0–6)	NA
2010	P. Jonovich	1–10 (1–5)	NA
2011	P. Jonovich	3–7 (0–4)	NA
2012	Angelo Paffumi	5–5 (2–3)	NA
2013	A. Paffumi	6–5 (1–4)	vs. Chandler (L) 55–16
2014	A. Paffumi	11–2 (5–1)	vs. Boulder Creek (W) 28–12 vs. Hamilton (L) 21–14
2015	A. Paffumi	12–1 (5–0)	vs. Sahuaro (W) 15–10 vs. Mesa (W) 30–7 vs. Marcos de Niza (L) 44–37
2016	A. Paffumi	9–2 (5–0)	vs. Red Mountain (L) 16–13
2017	A. Paffumi	6–5 (4–1)	vs. Hamilton (L) 49–27
2018	A. Paffumi	5–5 (4–1)	N/A
2019	George Hawthorne	2–8 (2–3)	N/A
2020	G. Hawthorne	2–6 (1–3)	N/A
2021	G. Hawthorne	1-9 (1-4)	N/A
2022	Adam Schiermyer	5-5 (0-5)	N/A
2023	A. Schiermyer	5-5 (2-3)	N/A

Awards:

- All-Region Champions: 4x
- All-City Champions: 3x
- Coach of the Year (Angelo Paffumi): 3x

== Feeder Schools ==
Junior high schools that feed into Skyline High School (and the elementary schools that feed into the junior high schools):

(Note: Some elementary schools feed into more than one junior high)

Fremont Junior High:

- Falcon Hill Elementary School
- Jefferson Elementary School
- Las Sendas Elementary School
- James Madison Elementary School
- Salk Elementary School
- William Howard Taft Elementary School
- Wilson Elementary School
- Zaharis Elementary School

Smith Junior High:

- Brinton Elementary School
- Patterson Elementary School
- Sousa Elementary School
- Stevenson Elementary School
- William Howard Taft Elementary School
- Zaharis Elementary School

== Notable alumni ==
- Kennedy McMann (2014) – Singer and Actress who starred in the CW's Nancy Drew. She has also appeared in Law & Order: Special Victims Unit and Gone.
- Braedon Bowman – Tight end who is currently a free agent. Formerly of the Los Angeles Chargers, New Orleans Saints, NY Jets, Jacksonville Jaquars and Birmingham Iron. Junior-College All American while attending Scottsdale Junior College & later attended, played & graduated from University of South Alabama.
