= Tom Swift (TV series) =

2022 American drama television series

- Genre: Mystery; Drama
- Based on: Tom Swift by Victor Appleton
- Developed by: Melinda Hsu Taylor & Noga Landau & Cameron Johnson
- Starring: Tian Richards; Ashleigh Murray; Marquise Vilsón; Albert Mwangi; April Parker Jones
- Music by: Matthew Head
- Country of origin: United States
- Original language: English
- No. of seasons: 1
- No. of episodes: 10

Production
- Executive producers: Anton Cropper; Lis Rowinski; Cameron Johnson; Noga Landau; Melinda Hsu Taylor; Stephanie Savage; Josh Schwartz
- Producers: Jonathan C. Brody; Kristin Killey
- Cinematography: Glenn Brown; Michael Blundell; Hollis Meminger
- Editors: Meghan Robertson; Hector Carrillo; Saleem Aziz; Brian H. Merrick
- Production companies: Furious Productions; Fake Empire; CBS Studios

Original release
- Network: The CW
- Release: May 31 – August 2, 2022

Related
- Nancy Drew

Tom Swift is an American mystery drama television series based on the series of science fiction novels about the titular character. A spinoff of Nancy Drew, the series was adapted for the CW by Melinda Hsu Taylor, Noga Landau and Cameron Johnson and is produced by CBS Studios, in association with Fake Empire.

In October 2020, the series development was announced by the CW, with the character set to make his debut in an episode of Nancy Drew. The backdoor pilot, "The Celestial Visitor", which aired on May 12, 2021, introduced the titular character, played by Tian Richards, and his artificial intelligence assistant, Barclay, voiced by LeVar Burton. It was later given a straight-to-series order in August 2021. The series also stars Ashleigh Murray, Marquise Vilsón, Albert Mwangi, and April Parker Jones.

The series debuted on May 31, 2022, to mixed reviews. In June 2022, after broadcasting the fifth episode, it was canceled by the CW, although, the network still broadcast the remaining episodes, with the series finale airing on August 2, 2022.

== Cast and characters ==
=== Main ===
- Tian Richards as Tom Swift, a young, billionaire inventor
- Ashleigh Murray as Zenzi Fullerton, Tom's cousin and best friend
- Marquise Vilsón as Isaac Vega, Tom's bodyguard
- Albert Mwangi as Rowan, a Congressman's security detail
- April Parker Jones as Lorraine Swift, Tom's mother

=== Recurring ===
- LeVar Burton as voice of Barclay, an artificial intelligence
- Brittany Ishibashi as Claire Cormier
- Ward Horton as Congressman Nathan Eskol, a friend of the Swift family
- Donovin Miller as Lino, Tom's adoptive brother
- Christopher B. Duncan as Barton Swift, Tom's father
- Hayward Leach as Justin Chase
- Elizabeth Cappuccino as Susannah Robb

== Episodes ==
=== Pilot (2021) ===
"No. overall" and "No. in season" for the pilot dictate the airing and location of the episode within the parent series.

| No. overall | No. in season | Title | Directed by | Written by | Original release date | US viewers (millions) |
|---|---|---|---|---|---|---|
| 33 | 15 | "The Celestial Visitor" | Ruben Garcia | Melinda Hsu Taylor & Noga Landau & Cameron Johnson | May 12, 2021 | 0.46 |
A young and rich inventor, Tom Swift, seeks Nancy Drew's help to find a meteorite that crashed into Horseshoe Bay in 1929 and is now causing many catastrophes in town due to a comet passing by earth. The meteorite is kept in Icarus Hall, the property purchased by the "Icarans", a fraternal organization made of men who ended up murdering each other after inhaling a smoke, created by the Women in White.

=== Series (2022) ===
| No. | Title | Directed by | Written by | Original release date | U.S. viewers (millions) |
|---|---|---|---|---|---|
| 1 | "...And the Liftoff to Saturn" | Anton Cropper | Melinda Hsu Taylor & Noga Landau & Cameron Johnson | May 31, 2022 | 0.44 |
| 2 | "...And the 4b Curl" | Michael Allowitz | Cameron Johnson | June 7, 2022 | 0.34 |
| 3 | "...And Nine Inches of Danger" | Jeff Byrd | Brad Marques & Fola Goke-Pariola | June 14, 2022 | 0.29 |
| 4 | "...And The Chocolate Cowboys" | Clara Aranovich | Teresa Huang & Sydney Baloue | June 21, 2022 | 0.37 |
| 5 | "...And The Crashed Cotillion" | Ruben Garcia | Michael Poisson & Brittany Northcross | June 28, 2022 | 0.34 |
| 6 | "...And The Benefits of Bondage" | Bille Woodruff | Erika Harrison & Eric Anthony Glover | July 5, 2022 | 0.30 |
| 7 | "...And The Book of Isaac" | Ruba Nadda | Teleplay by : Melinda Hsu Taylor; Story by : Elliott Feliciano & Kahlil Maskati | July 12, 2022 | 0.25 |
| 8 | "...And His Two Men and a Baby" | J. Miller Tobin | Teresa Huang & Bradley Marques | July 19, 2022 | 0.28 |
| 9 | "...And the Night to Remember" | Andi Behring | Erika Harrison | July 26, 2022 | 0.28 |
| 10 | "...And the Cost of Forgiveness" | Rose Troche | Cameron Johnson & Michael Poisson | August 2, 2022 | 0.24 |

== Production ==
=== Development ===
On October 28, 2020, it was announced that The CW was developing a spin-off from their Nancy Drew series titled Tom Swift. The series is based on the book series of the same name and is created and executive produced by Melinda Hsu Taylor, Noga Landau, and Cameron Johnson. The show is set in the "Drew-niverse". On February 8, 2021, it was announced that Ruben Garcia will be directing the pilot episode. On August 30, 2021, The CW had given the production a straight-to-series order and it was expected to debut during the 2021–22 television season. Josh Schwartz, Stephanie Savage, and Lis Rowinski were also added as executive producers.

Lead actor Richards said of the adaptation, "The original Tom Swift was great for his time and what he represented. At the time, that was the face of young boys, All-American kids full of possibilities. But in 2021, that can look so different. It can look like someone like me—a Black guy who is chocolate, who is queer, who is all those things that we're told aren't the normal or the status quo." He added, "We're going to dive into so many sectors of identity. We're going to talk about Blackness—and a different kind of Blackness than we're used to seeing, which is the Black elite, the 1 percent, the billionaires. We're also going to talk about a queer boy's journey into becoming a queer man. Not only self-acceptance, but acceptance as a whole, having the community and people around you."

The series started filming in Atlanta in late-January 2022, which was completed between late April-early May. It premiered on The CW on May 31, 2022. On June 30, 2022, the series was canceled after one season due to low viewership, although it was allowed to have the rest of the episodes for the season aired on The CW. The series finale aired on August 2, 2022.

=== Casting ===
On January 26, 2021, Tian Richards was cast in the title role of Tom Swift. On May 11, 2021, LeVar Burton joined the main cast to voice an artificial intelligence named Barclay. Richards and Burton both appear as their respective characters in the May 2021 Nancy Drew episode "The Celestial Visitor". In February 2022, Ashleigh Murray, Marquise Vilsón, April Parker Jones, and Albert Mwangi joined the cast in starring roles. On March 8, 2022, Ward Horton was cast in a recurring role.

== Reception ==
=== Critical response ===
Caroline Framke, writing for Variety, said "When the show leans into this more personal conflict, thus allowing Richards to deepen his performance and character, it works. Outside its flawed hero, though, “Tom Swift” suffers from a surprising lack of imagination given all the ostensibly impressive innovation at the heart of the Swift empire" but said the series should be given a chance to recover from a "shaky launch".

The review aggregator website Rotten Tomatoes reported a 60% approval rating with an average rating of 8/10, based on 5 critic reviews.

=== Ratings ===
Viewership and ratings per episode of Tom Swift
| No. | Title | Air date | Rating (18–49) | Viewers (millions) |
|---|---|---|---|---|
| 1 | "...And the Liftoff to Saturn" | May 31, 2022 | 0.1 | 0.44 |
| 2 | "...And the 4b Curl" | June 7, 2022 | 0.1 | 0.34 |
| 3 | "...And Nine Inches of Danger" | June 14, 2022 | 0.1 | 0.29 |
| 4 | "...And the Chocolate Cowboys" | June 21, 2022 | 0.0 | 0.37 |
| 5 | "...And the Crashed Cotillion" | June 28, 2022 | 0.1 | 0.34 |
| 6 | "..And the Benefits of Bondage" | July 5, 2022 | 0.0 | 0.30 |
| 7 | "...And the Book of Isaac" | July 12, 2022 | 0.0 | 0.25 |
| 8 | "...And His Two Men and a Baby" | July 19, 2022 | 0.0 | 0.28 |
| 9 | "...And the Night to Remember" | July 26, 2022 | 0.1 | 0.28 |
| 10 | "...And the Cost of Forgiveness" | August 2, 2022 | 0.0 | 0.24 |

=== Cancellation ===
On June 30, 2022, The CW canceled Tom Swift after one season. The series averaged a 0.05 rating in the 18-49 demographic and 355,000 viewers in live+same day ratings, the lowest viewership among The CW's 2021-22 scripted series. Following the cancellation announcement, CBS Studios indicated plans to shop the series to other networks and attempted to extend the cast's options, though no other network picked up the series. The remaining four episodes of the season aired on The CW through August 2, 2022.

The cancellation of Tom Swift was part of a broader wave of cancellations at The CW during the 2022 transition period ahead of Nexstar Media Group's acquisition of 75% of the network, which was finalized in August 2022. In 2022, The CW cancelled ten shows—three times the average number of 3.3 shows the network had cancelled annually over the previous decade. Nearly all of the cancelled series, including Tom Swift, Batwoman, 4400, Kung Fu, Legends of Tomorrow, Legacies, and Charmed, featured one or more main LGBTQ characters. Following the cancellations and ownership transition, GLAAD's 2023-24 report noted that The CW's percentage of LGBTQ series regulars dropped significantly for the first time in seven years, with the organization stating that "after Nexstar purchased The CW in 2022, nearly all original programming was canceled, and the company intended to cut costs and appeal to an older demographic, thus shuttering many shows featuring young LGBTQ people." At the time of the cancellations, CW chairman Mark Pedowitz stated that "content was never a factor in deciding not to move forward with a show," attributing the decisions to financial and strategic considerations during the network's transition.
