= Kennedy McMann =

American actress

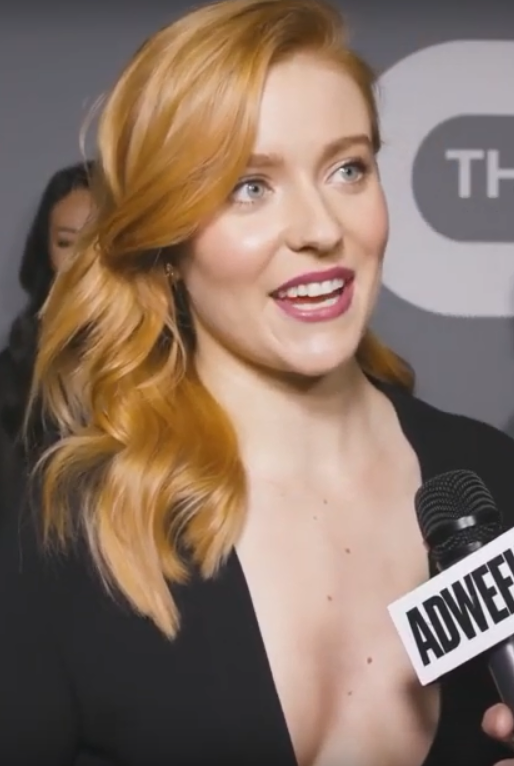
- McMann at The CW Upfront 2019
- Born: Kennedy Paige McMann; October 30, 1996 (age 30); Holland, Michigan, U.S.
- Education: Carnegie Mellon University (BFA)
- Occupation: Actress
- Years active: 2017–present
- Notable work: Nancy Drew
- Spouse: Sam McInerney (m. 2020)
- Children: 1
- Mother: Lisa McMann

Kennedy Paige McMann (born October 30, 1996) is an American actress. She is best known for her portrayal of the character Nancy Drew in the CW television series of the same name (2019–2023).

== Early life ==
McMann was born Kennedy Paige McMann on October 30, 1996 in Holland, Michigan, the daughter of Matthew and author Lisa McMann (née Gort). She moved with her family to Arizona during her mid-elementary school years. She has an older brother named Kilian (b. 1993). She graduated in 2014 from Skyline High School where she was named one of Mesa Public Schools' five inaugural Students of the Month honorees during her senior year on November 12, 2013. McMann earned a Bachelor of Fine Arts in Acting from Carnegie Mellon University in 2018.

== Career ==
In February 2019, McMann was signed as the titular character in the CW's television adaptation of Nancy Drew. The series premiered in October 2019, and was renewed for a second season in January 2020. After four seasons, the series ended in August 2023.

In March 2023, McMann appeared as Joni DeGroot — a lawyer who has obsessive compulsive disorder — in the Good Doctor episode "The Good Lawyer." The character was planned to be spun off into her own series, but ABC decided in November not to proceed with the project.

McMann has also made guest appearances on Law & Order: Special Victims Unit and Tell Me Lies.

== Personal life ==
McMann married her longtime boyfriend Sam McInerney in 2020. They met as fellow students at Carnegie Mellon University. On November 14, 2025, McMann announced on Instagram she is expecting the couple's first child.

McMann has had obsessive–compulsive disorder since she was a child.

== Filmography ==
Television
Year	Title	Role	Notes
2017	Gone	Sara Moreland	Episode: "Family Photo"
2018	Law & Order: Special Victims Unit	Carol Solomon	Episode: "Revenge"
2019–23	Nancy Drew	Nancy Drew	Main role
2020	This Is Not A Love Letter		Short film
2022	Tell Me Lies	Georgia	2 episodes
2022	World's Funniest Animals	Self	Episode 305
2023	The Good Doctor	Joni DeGroot	Episode: "The Good Lawyer"
2026	The Terror: Devil in Silver	Young Dorry	Episode: "Vermillion"
2026	Cupertino	Celeste Malone	Episode: “Celeste” Season 1, Episode 5

Film
Year	Title	Role	Notes
2024	Brewmance	Amber	Post-production
