= Maddison Jaizani =

English actress

- Born: Maddison Sunshine Al-Jaizani; 3 June 1995 (age 31); Kensington and Chelsea, London, England
- Education: Sir John Deane's College; Bury College
- Occupations: Actress; model
- Years active: 2014–present
- Known for: Nancy Drew; Into the Badlands; Versailles

Maddison Sunshine Al-Jaizani (born 3 June 1995) is an English actress and model. She is known for her roles as Sophie de Clermont in the Canal+ series Versailles (2015–2018), Odessa in the AMC series Into the Badlands (2017–2019), and Bess Marvin in the CW series Nancy Drew (2019–2023).

== Early life ==
Jaizani was born in London to an English mother and an Iraqi father and grew up in Sale, Greater Manchester. She attended Sir John Deane's College for sixth form. She completed a BTEC Extended Diploma in performing arts at Bury College in 2014.

== Career ==
Jaizani made her television debut as teenage Leila (played by Moran Atias as an adult) in the 2014 episode "State of Emergency" of the FX political drama Tyrant. From 2015 to 2018, Jaizani starred as Sophie de Clermont, later Duchesse de Cassel, in the Canal+ and BBC Two historical drama Versailles. She had a recurring role as Odessa in latter two seasons of the AMC series Into the Badlands. In March 2019, Jaizani was cast as Bess in The CW mystery series Nancy Drew.

In 2020, Jaizani signed with Elite Model Management.

== Filmography ==
Television roles
Year	Title	Role	Notes
2014	Tyrant	Teenage Leila	Episode: "State of Emergency"
2015–2018	Versailles	Sophie de Clermont	Main role
2017–2019	Into the Badlands	Odessa	Recurring role (seasons 2–3)
2019–2023	Nancy Drew	Bess Marvin	Main role
