= Pure Genius =

2016 American medical drama television series

- Genre: Medical drama
- Created by: Jason Katims; Sarah Watson
- Starring: Augustus Prew; Dermot Mulroney; Odette Annable; Brenda Song; Reshma Shetty; Aaron Jennings; Ward Horton
- Composer: Will Bates
- Country of origin: United States
- Original language: English
- No. of seasons: 1
- No. of episodes: 13

Production
- Executive producers: Sarah Watson; David Semel; Michelle Lee; Jason Katims
- Producer: Patrick Ward
- Running time: 45 minutes
- Production companies: True Jack Productions; CBS Television Studios; Universal Television

Original release
- Network: CBS
- Release: October 27, 2016 – January 26, 2017

Pure Genius (originally titled Bunker Hill) is an American medical drama television series created by Jason Katims that aired on CBS from October 27, 2016 to January 26, 2017. The series stars Augustus Prew as James Bell, who is a Silicon Valley tech billionaire, and Dermot Mulroney as Dr. Walter Wallace. It was produced by True Jack Production, CBS Television Studios and Universal Television. In May 2017, CBS cancelled the series after one season due to negative reviews from critics and lack of an audience.

== Premise ==
James Bell is a Silicon Valley billionaire who dreams of building a hospital with ultimate cutting-edge technology to treat rare and incurable diseases. He partners with a maverick surgeon, Dr. Walter Wallace, who leads the effort in clearing out the bureaucracy of medicine, and focus on forward thinking, advancing technology, and saving lives—at no cost to the patient.

== Cast and characters ==
- Augustus Prew as James Bell, a Silicon Valley tech billionaire who opens Bunker Hill. He originally kept it secret that the hospital was founded to develop treatments for his impending hereditary mental disorder. Though James keeps the research going, he devotes his energy to every rare case the hospital gets.
- Dermot Mulroney as Dr. Walter Wallace, a triple board-certified and renowned surgeon, who also serves as the Bunker Hill's Chief of Staff.
- Odette Annable as Dr. Zoe Brockett, a double board-certified physician in Paediatrics and Internal Medicine
- Reshma Shetty as Dr. Talaikha Channarayapatra, neurosurgeon
- Brenda Song as Angie Cheng, Bunker Hill's Chief Biomedical Engineer
- Aaron Jennings as Dr. Malik Verlaine, head of the Ehub which performs remote monitoring of patients
- Ward Horton as Dr. Scott Strauss, an Ivy League–educated neurologist and Catholic priest

== Episodes ==
No.	Title	Directed by	Written by	Original release date	Prod. code	U.S. viewers (millions)
1	"Pilot"	David Semel	Jason Katims and Sarah Watson	October 27, 2016	101	6.23
Dr. Wallace gets fired for performing a non-FDA-approved procedure on an eight-year-old patient who did not survive. He is invited to join Bunker Hill and has his body 3D scanned to be immortalized as an action figure. James gives him the quick tour. Margo comes in for help with her unborn child, as her cancer is growing too rapidly. They need to keep her alive until her fetus becomes viable at 20 weeks so they can remove the tumor and save the mother without forfeiting the child's life. Wallace practices the delicate surgery on 3D models of the tumor. The baby and mother both survive, with the child one of the youngest on record at 146 days old. A 15-year-old girl, Krissy Ramirez, is in a coma; Dr. Channarayapatra gets her transferred to Bunker Hill and they use a cutting edge brain-to-brain mind reading system to communicate with her. Her father talks to her and she sends a message back through the helmet. James has tested positive for Gerstmann–Sträussler–Scheinker syndrome (GSS), which is why he built Bunker Hill and why he wants to study a GSS patient, Louis Keating.
2	"It's Your Friendly Neighborhood Spider Silk Surgery"	Richard J. Lewis	Jon Cowan	November 3, 2016	103	5.37
A boy's legs get crushed under a car while he is playing in the street. The team needs to devise a way to repair them to avoid amputation. Since they would need over 100 screws to repair the legs, Malik wants to use spider silk screws and webbing to repair them, but Zoe feels the best option is to amputate. A woman with liver disease comes into Bunker Hill. The team works out a plan to find a donor: her dad. However, his liver is damaged from a history of alcohol abuse. James suggests the use of macrophages to repair the liver so that it can be used. Zoe wants to get a park for the neighborhood where the boy got hurt and asks James for help. During the park set-up, James tells Zoe he actually bought six lots, not just one.
3	"You Must Remember This"	Jessica Yu	Yahlin Chang	November 10, 2016	106	5.39
A police officer who was the victim of a car accident is admitted with memory regression—he now thinks he is a kid. They do a brain scan to try and find his adult memories, including those of his wife. After James maps his memories, they manage to find most of them except those of the wife. Later, when they are sitting on a park bench, the memories of his wife start returning. An overweight patient is admitted; she needs an MRI, but the only one large enough is at the zoo. They find a tumor that causes her to want to eat. They need to operate, but she needs to lose 40–50 pounds before they can safely perform the surgery. The staff creates a custom diet plan connected to an app that counts calories and a neural inhibitor that will tell her when to feel full.
4	"Not Your Grandmother's Robotic Surgery"	Mark Piznarski	Jason Katims	November 17, 2016	102	5.48
James brings his third grade teacher in for meniscus tear surgery and wants Wallace to use robotics. They find a cystic mass and the resulting biopsy shows stage 4 kidney cancer that has metastasized throughout her body. To fully remove the cancer, they would need to perform four operations, but her body wouldn't be able to handle the stress. The team creates a special computer-controlled robotic surgeon that will perform all four surgeries at once. A blind military veteran comes in who has constant pain, so Brockett and Channarayapatra implant a device to stop the pain. Once they turn it on, the patient sees a flash of light, which leads them to devise a way for him to see. He does not want the operation, so Brockett flies in his best friend who was injured in the same attack and he convinces him to go ahead.
5	"Fire and Ice"	Norberto Barba	Julia Brownell	November 24, 2016	104	4.77
James convinces a hockey player with a severe spinal injury to undergo risky surgery that could enable him to walk again.
6	"Bunker Hill, We Have a Problem"	Dylan K. Massin	Meredith Averill	December 1, 2016	105	4.76
Walter and the Bunker Hill surgeons must perfect a revolutionary remote surgery when someone on the International Space Station needs an emergency procedure. Also, the team uses social media to locate the source of an E. coli outbreak in town and Zoe and Malik's flirtation heats up.
7	"A Bunker Hill Christmas"	Michael Engler	Jason Katims	December 8, 2016	107	5.62
When a young leukemia patient comes to Bunker Hill in need of a miracle, James hopes a new T cell cancer treatment will save her life, as her optimism inspires him to become a better person. Also, Malik and Zoe agree to go on a date just as James confesses his feelings to her and Julianna's Christmas visit with Walter uncovers the strain in their long-distance marriage.
8	"Around the World in Eight Kidneys"	Dylan K. Massin	Denise Hahn	December 15, 2016	108	5.50
James and the surgeons of Bunker Hill try to make medical history with an organ transplant chain of 16 surgeries with donors and patients from all over the world.
9	"Grace"	Rosemary Rodriguez	Andrew Hinderaker	January 1, 2017	109	5.46
James uses a radical anti-viral treatment on a man plagued by a drug-resistant variety of HIV; James connects with Keating's nurse. Walter takes on Allie, his daughter's partner after a rare infection gets in a cut on her foot.
10	"Hero Worship"	Michael Weaver	Ted Sullivan	January 5, 2017	110	5.24
After the discovery of a region plagued by a respiratory epidemic leads James to meet his childhood hero, he soon discovers why you should never meet your heroes, as the man he once loved displays a lack of morality. Meanwhile, Dr Brockett and Dr Horton attempt to help a teenage boy suffering from a psychosomatic illness.
11	"Touch and Go"	Patrick Norris	Meredith Averill	January 12, 2017	111	5.15
James and Zoe attempt experimental treatments on a girl with a rare skin disorder, trying to heal her in time for her prom; James ponders an experimental cure for Louis Keating's progressing GSS; Malik is envious of James and Zoe's special connection.
12	"I Got This"	Michael Weaver	Julia Brownell	January 19, 2017	112	5.27
Talaikha and Malik treat a famous singer with laryngeal cancer; Angie tricks her mother into seeing Scott as a patient because she thinks her herbalist superstitions aren't enough; James is concerned over the outcome of Louis Keating's GSS trial.
13	"Lift Me Up"	Norberto Barba	Jon Cowan	January 26, 2017	113	5.20
Angie tries to target her mother's cancer using a new technology; Walter, Malik, and Zoe use suspended animation to stop a man's internal bleeding; Julianna discovers that James used the unapproved GSS medicine on Louis Keating.

== Production ==
=== Development ===
On January 22, 2016, it was announced that CBS had given the pilot order known as Bunker Hill. The episode was written and authored by Jason Katims who was expected to be an executive producer, alongside Sarah Watson, David Semel and Michelle Lee. Production companies involved with the pilot include True Jack Productions, CBS Television Studios and Universal Television. The show was ordered at the CBS upfronts 2016 to air in the network's 2016–17 TV schedule and was officially picked up on May 13, 2016. A few days later, it was announced that it would premiere by October 27, 2016 and air on Thursdays at 10:00 P.M. On August 10, 2016, it was announced that the series name was changed from Bunker Hill to Pure Genius.

On November 21, 2016, CBS announced that it would not order more episodes than the 13 episodes commissioned. The production for the first season wrapped on December 15, 2016, and the remaining commissioned episodes were broadcast for the remainder of its run.

On May 17, 2017, Pure Genius was cancelled after one season by CBS.

=== Casting ===
In February 2016, it was announced that Brenda Song, Dermot Mulroney, Reshma Shetty and Ward Horton had been cast in the pilot's leading roles. Although the pilot was ordered, in March 2016 it was reported that Aaron Jennings and Odette Annable had joined the cast.

== Reception ==
=== Critical reception ===
Pure Genius has received generally negative reviews from television critics. Review aggregator website Rotten Tomatoes reported a 26% rating based on reviews from 23 critics. The website's consensus reads, "Pure Genius is weighed down by stereotypical doctor drama trappings, suffocating its chances of bringing anything compelling and entertaining to the genre." Metacritic reported a score of 43 out of 100 based on 19 reviews, indicating "mixed or average reviews".

Willa Paskin of Slate described the show as "idiotic tech propaganda that’s about one-tenth as curious about the issues it raises as it should be." They characterized the show as featuring implausible science and technologies where workers have no regard for patient privacy, and James as a contemptuous CEO-type character who is consistently more confident than Bunker Hill's medical professionals.

=== Ratings ===
Viewership and ratings per episode of Pure Genius
No.	Title	Air date	Rating/share (18–49)	Viewers (millions)	DVR (18–49)	DVR viewers (millions)	Total (18–49)	Total viewers (millions)
1	"Pilot"	October 27, 2016	1.0/4	6.23	—N/a	—N/a	—N/a	—N/a
2	"It's Your Friendly Neighborhood Spider Silk Surgery"	November 3, 2016	0.9/3	5.37	TBD	TBD	TBD	TBD
3	"You Must Remember This"	November 10, 2016	0.9/3	5.39	0.6	2.59	1.5	7.98
4	"Not Your Grandmother's Robotic Surgery"	November 17, 2016	0.9/3	5.48	TBD	TBD	TBD	TBD
5	"Fire and Ice"	November 24, 2016	0.8/3	4.77	TBD	TBD	TBD	TBD
6	"Bunker Hill, We Have a Problem"	December 1, 2016	0.8/3	4.76	0.5	2.49	1.3	7.25
7	"A Bunker Hill Christmas"	December 8, 2016	1.0/3	5.62	—N/a	2.53	—N/a	8.16
8	"Around the World in Eight Kidneys"	December 15, 2016	0.9/3	5.50	TBD	TBD	TBD	TBD
9	"Grace"	January 1, 2017	0.7/2	5.46	TBD	TBD	TBD	TBD
10	"Hero Worship"	January 5, 2017	0.8/3	5.24	TBD	TBD	TBD	TBD
11	"Touch and Go"	January 12, 2017	0.9/3	5.15	TBD	TBD	TBD	TBD
12	"I Got This"	January 19, 2017	0.8/3	5.27	TBD	TBD	TBD	TBD
13	"Lift Me Up"	January 26, 2017	0.7/3	5.20	TBD	TBD	TBD	TBD
