= Nancy Drew (2019 TV series) =

American mystery drama television series (2019–2023)

- Genre: Mystery; Drama
- Based on: Nancy Drew by Edward Stratemeyer
- Developed by: Noga Landau; Josh Schwartz; Stephanie Savage
- Showrunners: Noga Landau; Melinda Hsu Taylor
- Starring: Kennedy McMann; Leah Lewis; Maddison Jaizani; Tunji Kasim; Alex Saxon; Alvina August; Riley Smith; Scott Wolf
- Music by: Siddhartha Khosla; Jeff Garber
- Country of origin: United States
- Original language: English
- No. of seasons: 4
- No. of episodes: 62 (list of episodes)

Production
- Executive producers: Lis Rowinski; Noga Landau; Melinda Hsu Taylor; Stephanie Savage; Josh Schwartz; S. Lily Hui; Larry Teng; Alex Taub
- Production locations: Vancouver, British Columbia
- Cinematography: John S. Bartley; Barry Donlevy; Shamus Whiting-Hewlett; Ryan Purcell; Andrew MacLeod; Bruce Worrall; Nick Thomas
- Editors: Jesse Ellis; Marc Pattavina; Hector Carrillo; L. Schroeder; Meghan Robertson; Scott Melendez; Erin Willetts; Brian H. Merrick
- Camera setup: Single-camera
- Running time: 40–44 minutes
- Production companies: Warm Bloody Sunday Productions; Furious Productions; Fake Empire; CBS Studios (Note: Credited as CBS Television Studios for season 1)

Original release
- Network: The CW
- Release: October 9, 2019 – August 23, 2023

Related
- Tom Swift

Nancy Drew is an American mystery drama television series based on the series of mystery novels about the titular character. The series was adapted for the CW by Noga Landau, Josh Schwartz, and Stephanie Savage and is produced by CBS Studios, in association with Fake Empire.

It is the third Nancy Drew television series, following The Hardy Boys/Nancy Drew Mysteries (1977–1979) and a 1995 Canadian-American version. Development for a new television series started in 2015 when CBS ordered a television pilot revolving around an adult Nancy but later passed on the project. It was later redeveloped for NBC until 2018, when the project moved to the CW where the series was ordered for a pilot. It was given a series order in May 2019.

The series is narrated and led by the amateur sleuth Nancy Drew, played by Kennedy McMann, and features an ensemble cast with reimagined versions of the characters from the books: Leah Lewis as George Fan, Maddison Jaizani as Bess Marvin, Tunji Kasim as Ned Nickerson, and Alex Saxon as Ace. It also stars Scott Wolf as Carson Drew and Alvina August and Riley Smith as new characters invented for the series.

The series debuted on October 9, 2019, to mixed reviews. In March 2022, it was renewed for a fourth and final season which premiered on May 31, 2023. The series finale aired on August 23, 2023. The series also spawned a spinoff, Tom Swift, which premiered in 2022 on the CW and ran for one season.

== Premise ==
After putting off applying to Columbia University to deal with the loss of her mother, eighteen-year-old Nancy Drew gets entangled in the investigation of town socialite Tiffany Hudson's murder. She and the employees of the Claw, the restaurant at which she works — prickly manager George Fan, worldly and polished waitress Bess Marvin, laidback dishwasher Ace, and mechanic Ned "Nick" Nickerson, whom she is having a no-strings-attached fling with — reluctantly ally to clear their names of suspicion. With secrets they're all determined to keep hidden, not only is Nancy determined to unveil them in order to trust them, she unearths a connection to Tiffany's homicide to a decade-long cold case turned urban legend.

== Cast and characters ==
Nancy Drew and her friends working a case as of Season 3. From left to right: George, Bess, Nick, Nancy, and Ace

=== Main ===
- Kennedy McMann as Nancy Drew, a brilliant former teenage detective whose sense of self used to come from solving mysteries, but who finds herself reluctantly drawn into a homicide case connecting to her family. This leads her to resume her old career with the assistance of a group of close friends, the Drew Crew. By the end of season 1, she discovers that the Drews are not her biological parents and that she is really a member of the wealthy, corrupt Hudson family. In the beginning of season 2, due to her vulnerable state, she is possessed by the Wraith, created by her ancestor Temperance Hudson, and has been draining her, leading her to have a more reckless and darker behavior, unbeknownst to everyone. The Drew Crew successfully gets rid of the Wraith and Nancy comes to terms with her growing feelings for Ace, though using the device that saved her catches the attention of Temperance Hudson, a witch from the Hudson family line that was exiled from Horseshoe Bay and is determined to get her revenge. By the end of season 3, she opens up an investigation agency to solve cases and mysteries that occur in the town.
- Leah Lewis as Georgia "George" Li-Yun Fan, Nancy's old nemesis from high school and the manager at the local diner, The Bayside Claw, which she later buys with the help of Nick. She later becomes Nick's love interest. In season 2, she succumbs to fatal injuries caused by the Aglacea until Nancy resurrects her with a mystical shroud from the Historical Society. It's revealed that the shroud attracted Odette Lamar, the spirit before she became the Aglacea, and put it in her body. Both struggle to control George's body but come to terms with the situation until they realize that the longer Odette remains in her body, the shorter George's lifespan becomes. In season 3, Nancy, Bess, and George successfully bring Odette's spirit out of her body and put her soul to rest using a soul splitter. By the end of season 3, she begins to pursue becoming a lawyer.
  - Lewis also portrays Odette Lamar (season 2), a formerly vengeful spirit in George's body.
- Maddison Jaizani as Bess Turani Marvin, a rich city girl with a mysterious past who works as a waitress with Nancy at the Bayside Claw and is also part of the Drew Crew. After running away from her con artist partner, Stephen, in England, she was an au pair in New Hampshire before being fired for getting caught stealing from the family. She later moves to Horseshoe Bay in search of her biological family, the notoriously wealthy Marvins. After Owen Marvin confirms their relation, the family takes her in. When Stephen returns and gets his revenge by planting a precious Marvin relic he stole on Bess to frame her, the Marvins exile her. She later lives with the Drew family and begins to learn magic from Temperance Hudson, becoming a witch, and Hannah Gruen, the former sole keeper of the Horseshoe Bay Historical Society allows her to take over alongside her new girlfriend, Addy Socotomah.
- Tunji Kasim as Ned "Nick" Nickerson, a former teenage convict and football player who now runs an auto repair shop. He is Nancy's ex-boyfriend and part of the Drew Crew. He later becomes George's love interest. He formerly resided in Florida before he was convicted of manslaughter, though it was in self defense against someone who was making advances towards his friend. He was represented by Nancy's father, Carson and his social worker was Nancy's mother, Katherine Drew. The key witness of the incident was Tiffany Hudson but after realizing her testimony was false, she apologized and they befriended one another during her visits. He was released from juvenile prison and moved to Horseshoe Bay, hoping for a fresh start and to keep in contact with Tiffany. In the beginning of season 3, he successfully opens up a youth center dedicated to giving struggling children of Horseshoe Bay a healthy environment to grow up in alongside George and Addy Socotomah, a STEM counselor who later becomes Bess's girlfriend. By the end of season 3, after considering moving back to Florida, he decides to stay in Horseshoe Bay and try and prioritize on his mental health and process his trauma from being imprisoned.
- Alex Saxon as Ace Hardy, the zen and amiable dishwasher/cook at The Bayside Claw with a secret to hide. He uses his computer hacking skills to assist the Drew Crew. He later becomes Nancy's love interest. He can speak sign language due to his former police officer father Thom being deaf after a car accident. It's later revealed that he was working with Chief McGinnis, the police chief by feeding him information on the others. This is due to McGinnis finding out that he tried to hack into a database to find someone in witness protection and struck a deal in order to keep him out of prison and because he is friends with his father, Thom. In season 2, the witness Ace sought is revealed to be Grant, his half-brother who is in witness protection due to his mother helping take down a company that was laundering money and was threatened by a former associate involved with a secret cult, the Road Back. By the end of season 3, he starts working at the morgue with Connor, the coroner from Season 2 that the Drew Crew helped by saving his son
- Alvina August as Karen Hart (season 1, eps. 1-16), (Note: In season one, Alvina August is credited as a series regular through "The Haunting of Nancy Drew"; however, from the next episode onward, August does not appear.) an investigator with the Horseshoe Bay police department who is dating Nancy's father Carson, but is later fired and arrested for interfering with a police investigation.
- Riley Smith as Ryan Hudson, a handsome and affluent socialite who is the husband of murder victim Tiffany Hudson. He also had an affair with George in season 1. He repeatedly crosses paths with Nancy in his quest to usurp control of his family's fortune from his parents, who treat him as a failure. In the end of season 1, it is revealed that he is Nancy Drew's biological father and that her mother was Lucy Sable. He later moves into the Drew residence as part of an agreement between him and Carson in exchange for him signing a document backdated to the night of Nancy's birth to protect Carson from kidnapping charges.
- Scott Wolf as Carson Drew, a criminal defense attorney and Nancy's widowed father, whose attempts to connect with Nancy since her mother's death have failed. Carson and his wife Katherine had secretly adopted Nancy in keeping with her biological mother's wishes.

=== Recurring ===
- Ariah Lee as Ted Fan, the second-youngest Fan daughter one of George's younger sisters
- Anthony Natale as Thom, Ace's father and the former Captain of the Horseshoe Bay police. He is deaf and communicates with sign language.
- Katie Findlay as Lisbeth (seasons 1–2), a woman working for the Hudson family and Bess's love interest. She is secretly an officer with the state police.
- Teryl Rothery as Celia Hudson (seasons 1–2), Ryan's mother and Everett's wife. At the beginning of season 2 she learns about her granddaughter being Nancy Drew and they form an unexpected bond.
- Martin Donovan (season 1) / Andrew Airlie (season 2) as Everett Hudson (seasons 1–2), Ryan's father and Celia's husband. He is a powerful member of the Hudson family.
- Judith Maxie as Diana Marvin (seasons 1–2), Bess's rich aunt who manipulates her niece into doing questionable things for the good of the family and a descendant of one of the founding fathers of Horseshoe Bay
- Liza Lapira as Victoria Fan (season 1), George's alcoholic mother who is a clairvoyant and sees ghosts
- Adam Beach as Chief E. O. McGinnis (season 1), the Horseshoe Bay sheriff and Karen's boss. He isn't fond of Nancy's knack for interfering with police investigations, but occasionally helps her anyway. He eventually leaves Horseshoe Bay to take a job in a different town after facing allegations of incompetence in the investigation of Lucy Sable's death.
- Stephanie Van Dyck as the ghost of Lucy Sable (season 1), a girl killed 19 years ago who is revealed to be Nancy Drew's biological mother at the end of season 1.
  - In season 1, Lizzie Boys portrays Lucy alive in four episodes.
- Sinead Curry as Tiffany Hudson (season 1), Ryan's wife who is murdered at the start of Season 1. Nancy's investigation reveals that she was killed by Lucy's half-brother.
- Sara Canning as Katherine Drew (season 1), Nancy's adoptive mother who died of pancreatic cancer a year earlier.
- Miles Gaston Villanueva as Owen Marvin (season 1), a socialite and part of the Marvin clan with ties to the Hudsons and a potential ally and former love interest to Nancy. He dies as a result of refusing to call Nancy upstairs at the birthday party that Bess organizes for Aunt Diana. We later find out Owen's death was because of Joshua and not the Aglaeca.
- Stevie Lynn Jones as Laura Tandy (season 1), Tiffany's sister who suspects her sister was murdered and pushes for further investigation, even drawing Ace, her ex-boyfriend, in to help. At the end of Season 1, she leaves to start a new life in Paris after finally ending things with Ace.
- Kenneth Mitchell as Joshua Dodd (season 1), Lucy Sable's half-brother
- Zoriah Wong as Charlie Fan (season 2–4; guest season 1), the youngest Fan daughter and one of George's younger sisters
- Geraldine Chiu as Jesse Fan (season 2–4), the second-oldest Fan daughter and one of George's younger sisters
- Carmen Moore as Hannah Gruen (season 2; guest seasons 1 and 3), a woman who works at the Historical Society
- Aadila Dosani as Amanda Bobbsey (season 2; guest season 3), Gil's twin sister and Ace's former love interest
- Ryan-James Hatanaka as Detective Abe Tamura (season 2), a new detective at Horseshoe Bay who inherits Karen Hart's cases. He encounters Nancy constantly and clashes due to their differing opinions on the supernatural
- Anja Savcic as Odette Lamar (season 2), the executed French heiress turned vengeful sea spirit before inhabiting George's body
- Praneet Akilla as Gil Bobbsey (season 2), Amanda's twin brother and Nancy's former love interest
- Shannon Kook as Grant (season 2), the new line cook at The Bayside Claw and Ace's half-brother
- Rukiya Bernard as Valentina Samuels (season 2), a reporter hired to write puff pieces about the Hudson family
- Bo Martynowska as Temperance Hudson (season 3; guest season 2), Nancy's immortal ancestor and a former member of the Women in White who practices witchcraft
- Erica Cerra as Jean Rosario (season 3; guest seasons 2, 4), a district attorney that later becomes Carson's love interest
- John Harlan Kim as Agent Park (season 3), an FBI agent that briefly dates Nancy
- Rachel Colwell as Addy Soctomah (seasons 3–4), a STEM counselor working for Ned's youth center and Bess's love interest
- Olivia Taylor Dudley as Charity Hudson-Dow (season 3), Temperance's deceased daughter.
  - Dudley also portrays Temperance Hudson, after the latter took her daughter's face.
- Henry Zaga as Tristan Glass (season 4), the Bayside Claw's lobster guy and Nancy's love interest
- Erin Cummings as Chief Lovette (season 4), the new Sheriff of Horseshoe Bay.

=== Guest ===
- Pamela Sue Martin as Harriet Grosset (season 1), a medium. Martin previously played the role of Nancy Drew in the 1977 series The Hardy Boys/Nancy Drew Mysteries
- Zibby Allen as Rita Howell (seasons 1–2), a ghost and victim of the Aglaeca
- Cecilia Grace Deacon as Autumn Curtis (seasons 1–2), a ghost Nancy met outside Claire's house
- Jaime M. Callica as Perry Barber (seasons 1–2), a ghost Nancy met outside Claire's house
- Luke Baines as John MacDonald (seasons 1–2), a ghost who believed Nick to be his deceased best friend
- Nicole Oliver as Rebecca (seasons 2–3), Ace's mother
- Tian Richards as Tom Swift (season 2), a billionaire inventor
- LeVar Burton as Barclay (season 2), Tom's AI companion
- Jeryl Prescott Gallien as Millicent Nickerson (season 2), Nick's mother

== Episodes ==
Season	Episodes	Originally released	
Season	Episodes	First released	Last released
1	18	October 9, 2019	April 15, 2020
2	18	January 20, 2021	June 2, 2021
3	13	October 8, 2021	January 28, 2022
4	13	May 31, 2023	August 23, 2023

== Production ==
=== Development ===
In September 2018, the CW announced that Josh Schwartz and Stephanie Savage were developing a new Nancy Drew series. The CW announced that the project was picked up for series on May 7, 2019. On May 16, 2019, the CW released the first official trailer for the series. On October 25, 2019, the series was picked up for a full season of 22 episodes. On January 7, 2020, the series was renewed for a second season. On February 3, 2021, the CW renewed the series for a third season. On March 22, 2022, the CW renewed the series for a fourth season. It announced later in October 2022 that the fourth season would be the final season of the show.

=== Casting ===
In early 2019, the pilot was cast with Kennedy McMann as the title character, Tunji Kasim as Ned "Nick" Nickerson, Alex Saxon as Ace, Leah Lewis as George, Maddison Jaizani as Bess, and Freddie Prinze Jr. as Nancy's father, Carson Drew. Pamela Sue Martin, who played Nancy Drew in the 1970s series The Hardy Boys/Nancy Drew Mysteries, was cast as Harriet Grosset for the pilot in April 2019. On May 9, 2019, it was announced that Scott Wolf had replaced Prinze in the role of Carson Drew. Riley Smith joined cast as Ryan Hudson on May 16, 2019. On October 28, 2019, Miles Gaston Villanueva was cast in a recurring role.

In December 2020, Aadila Dosani was cast in a recurring role for the second season as Amanda Bobbsey. Her twin brother, Gil Bobbsey, is portrayed by Praneet Akilla.

=== Filming ===
Principal photography for the first season began on July 22, 2019, and was expected to end on April 7, 2020, in Vancouver, British Columbia. On March 12, 2020, production was halted until further notice due to the COVID-19 pandemic. However, on April 14, 2020, it was revealed that episode 18 would serve as the season one finale. The second season began filming on September 29, 2020. However, due to COVID-19 testing, filming was stopped shortly after and resumed a week later. Production of the second season ended on April 29, 2021. The third season began production on July 13, 2021, and concluded on December 9, 2021. Filming for the fourth season began on July 19, 2022, and concluded on December 15, 2022.

== Broadcast ==
Nancy Drew premiered on The CW in the United States on Wednesday, October 9, 2019, with the season 4 premiere of Riverdale as its lead-in. The second season premiered on January 20, 2021. The third season premiered on October 8, 2021. The fourth and final season premiered on May 31, 2023, and the series finale aired on August 23, 2023. In Canada, Nancy Drew was televised on the W Network and in Malaysia, Nancy Drew was televised on the PRIMEtime.

HBO Max and CBS All Access acquired the streaming rights to the series in the United States, with seasons available on their platforms several days after the season finale airs.

== Reception ==
=== Critical response ===
On review aggregator Rotten Tomatoes, Nancy Drew holds an approval rating of 53% based on 30 reviews, with an average rating of 7.3/10. The website's critical consensus reads, "An appealing aesthetic and promising ensemble can't quite manage to liven up Nancy Drew, an overly broody and unfortunately bland mystery that follows too closely in the footsteps of the shows it aspires to be." On Metacritic, it has a weighted average score of 55 out of 100, based on 12 critics, indicating "mixed or average reviews".

=== Ratings ===
Viewership and ratings per season of Nancy Drew
Season	Timeslot (ET)	Episodes	First aired		Last aired		TV season	Viewership rank	Avg. viewers (millions)
Season	Timeslot (ET)	Episodes	Date	Viewers (millions)	Date	Viewers (millions)	TV season	Viewership rank	Avg. viewers (millions)
1	Wednesday 9:00 p.m.	18	October 9, 2019	1.18	April 15, 2020	0.49	2019–20	126	1.25
2	Wednesday 9:00 p.m.	18	January 20, 2021	0.50	June 2, 2021	0.49	2020–21	148	0.86
3	Friday 9:00 p.m.	13	October 8, 2021	0.42	January 28, 2022	0.35	2021–22	131	0.74
4	Wednesday 8:00 p.m.	13	May 31, 2023	0.39	August 23, 2023	0.35	2022–23	TBD	0.38

== Tie-in novels ==
On March 31, 2020, the first tie-in novel for the show was published. Entitled Nancy Drew: The Curse it was written by Micol Ostow and served as a prequel to the show's events.

== Spin-off ==
On October 28, 2020, it was announced that The CW was developing a spin-off titled Tom Swift. The series was based on the book series of the same name and was created by Melinda Hsu Taylor, Noga Landau, and Cameron Johnson. On January 26, 2021, Tian Richards was cast in the titular role. On February 8, 2021, it was announced that Ruben Garcia would be directing the pilot episode. On May 11, 2021, LeVar Burton joined the main cast to voice an AI named Barclay. On August 30, 2021, Tom Swift was ordered straight-to-series and was expected to debut during the 2021–22 television season. In February 2022, Ashleigh Murray joined the cast as Zenzi Fullington. Later that month, Marquise Vilsón, April Parker Jones, and Albert Mwangi joined the regular cast in the roles of Isaac Vega, Lorraine Swift, and Rowan, respectively. In March 2022, Ward Horton was cast in a recurring role. Tom Swift premiered on May 31, 2022 and was cancelled after one season.
