= Ward Horton =

American actor (born 1976)

- Born: Ward Kirby Horton; January 14, 1976 (age 50); Morristown, New Jersey, U.S.
- Education: Durham Academy
- Alma mater: Wake Forest University
- Occupation: Actor
- Years active: 2000–present
- Spouse: Alexa Horton (m. 2000)
- Children: 2

Ward Kirby Horton (born January 14, 1976) is an American actor. He is known for playing John Form in Annabelle. In the fall of 2018, he played Ed in a Broadway revival of Torch Song Trilogy. Horton appeared in the HBO show The Gilded Age as Charles Fane.

== Filmography ==
=== Film ===
Year	Title	Role	Notes
2000	Clowns	Russell	
2003	The Pink House	Stoner	
2004	13 Going on 30	Featured extra	Uncredited
2005	Four Eyed Monsters	Studio Vermont artist	
2006	Dress Rehearsal	Kyle Zanner	
2006	East Broadway	Banker	
2006	Nail Polish	Julian	
2006	We Fight to Be Free	Richard Chamberlayne	Short film
2009	I Hate Valentine's Day	Mark	
2009	Veronika Decides to Die	PR guy	
2009	The Mighty Macs	Frankie Sharkey	
2012	Letting Go	Jonathan	
2013	The Wolf of Wall Street	Rothschild Broker	
2014	Annabelle	John Form	
2015	Alto	FBI Agent Laughlin	
2016	Bakery in Brooklyn	Paul	
2017	Midnighters	Smith	
2017	Annabelle: Creation	John Form	
2018	Marcy	Jim	
2019	Ford v Ferrari	Test Driver - Burt	
2024	Which Brings Me to You	Mark	
2024	Psycho Therapy	David	
2025	Atrabilious	Miles Zimmerman	

=== Television ===
Year	Title	Role	Notes
2004	Guiding Light	Oliver	Unknown episodes
2004	Law & Order: Special Victims Unit	Alan Richter	Episode: "Weak"
2004	Hope & Faith	Cute frat guy	Episode: "Do I Look Frat in This?"
2006	All My Children	Yacht club manager	2 episodes
2007	Law & Order	Mike Gorman	Episode: "Church"
2007	Day Break	Concierge	Episode: "What If He's Not Alone?"
2007	Gossip Girl	Edward Abbot	Episode: "The Handmaiden's Tale"
2009	Law & Order	Josh Barton	Episode: "Just a Girl in the World"
2009	Fringe	Mustang man	Episode: "Midnight"
2009	CSI: Miami	Toastmaster	Episode: "Kill Clause"
2010	Mercy	Will Hamilton	Episode: "We All Saw This Coming"
2011	Body of Proof	James Savage	Episode: "Second Chances"
2012	White Collar	Robert Withrow	Episode: "Stealing Home"
2012	Elementary	Soap opera actor	Episode: "Pilot"
2013	Royal Pains	Brandon	Episode: "Vertigo"
2013	One Life to Live	Dean Trayger	14 episodes
2016–2017	Pure Genius	Dr. Scott Strauss	Main role, 13 episodes
2019	The Good Fight	Gordon	Episode: "The One Where a Nazi Gets Punched"
2020	FBI: Most Wanted	Robbie Pierce	Episode: "Ride or Die"
2021	Prodigal Son	Dr. Flynt Donahue	Episode: "Face Value"
2021	Younger	Brett Watkins	2 episodes
2021	New Amsterdam	FBI Agent Aiden Maldonado	Episode: "Paid in Full"
2022	The Equalizer	Roger Nardoni	Episode: "Legacy"
2022	Tom Swift	Nathan Eskol	Recurring
2022–2023	The Gilded Age	Charles Fane	14 episodes
2025-2026	The Night Agent	U.S. President Richard Hagan	Main role (season 3); guest (season 2)

== Theatre ==
Year	Title	Role	Notes
2018	Torch Song	Ed	Broadway revival

== Awards and nominations ==
Year	Association	Category	Project	Result	Ref.
2023	Screen Actors Guild Awards	Outstanding Ensemble in a Drama Series	The Gilded Age	Nominated	
