= Fake Empire (company) =

American film and television production company

- The first Fake Empire logo to be used as seen on the Gossip Girl TV series, featuring key elements of the show
- Type: Private
- Industry: Film industry
- Genre: Production company
- Founded: 2003; 23 years ago, in Los Angeles, California, U.S. (as College Hill Pictures)
- Founders: Josh Schwartz; Stephanie Savage
- Headquarters: Los Angeles, California, U.S.
- Key people: Josh Schwartz; Stephanie Savage
- Products: Films; Television series
- Website: fakeempire.com

Fake Empire is the production company that was formed in 2010 by Josh Schwartz and Stephanie Savage to develop and produce television series and feature films. Their most notable productions include the series Gossip Girl (developed by Schwartz and Savage), Chuck (co-created by Schwartz and Chris Fedak), Hart of Dixie (created by Leila Gerstein and produced by Schwartz, Savage, and their producing partner Len Goldstein), The Carrie Diaries (developed by Amy B. Harris and produced by Schwartz and Savage), Dynasty (developed by Sallie Patrick, Schwartz, and Savage), Marvel's Runaways (created for television by Schwartz and Savage), and The CW shows Nancy Drew and Tom Swift. The company was formed to focus on television projects and produce films, with the intent of branching out into online series, music and books. Schwartz formerly operated under the banner of College Hill Pictures, Inc., which folded in the making of Fake Empire. In 2010, the company developed a first look deal with Paramount. In 2013, Fake Empire was moved from Warners to ABC, which was followed by a deal with Universal in 2014.

Both the film and television divisions of the company are overseen by Lis Rowinski.

== Productions ==
The following tables lists the production credit of Fake Empire, and its previous incarnation, College Hill Pictures, Inc.

=== Films ===
| Title | Year | Director | Note |
|---|---|---|---|
| Fun Size | 2012 | Josh Schwartz | With Nickelodeon Movies and Anonymous Content; Distributed by Paramount Pictures |
| Endless Love | 2014 | Shana Feste | With Bluegrass Films; Distributed by Universal Pictures |

=== TV movies ===
| Title | Year | Director | Network | Note |
|---|---|---|---|---|
| No Cameras Allowed | 2014 | James Marcus Haney | MTV | With Union Entertainment |

=== TV series ===
| Title | Year | Network | Note |
|---|---|---|---|
| The O.C. | 2003–2007 | Fox | With Wonderland Sound and Vision, Warner Bros. Television and Hypnotic (season 1) |
| Gossip Girl | 2007–2012 | The CW | With Alloy Entertainment, CBS Television Studios and Warner Bros. Television |
| Chuck | 2007–2012 | NBC | With Wonderland Sound and Vision and Warner Bros. Television |
| Hart of Dixie | 2011–2015 | The CW | With CBS Television Studios, Warner Bros. Television and Dogarooski Productions (season 4) |
| The Carrie Diaries | 2013–2014 | The CW | With A.B. Baby Productions and Warner Bros. Television |
| Cult | 2013 | The CW | With Rockne S. O'Bannon Television, CBS Television Studios and Warner Bros. Television |
| The Astronaut Wives Club | 2015 | ABC | With Groundswell Productions and ABC Studios |
| Dynasty | 2017–2022 | The CW | With Richard and Esther Shapiro Productions, Rabbit Ears, Inc. and CBS Studios |
| Runaways | 2017–2019 | Hulu | With ABC Signature Studios and Marvel Television |
| Nancy Drew | 2019–2023 | The CW | With Warm Bloody Sunday Productions, Furious Productions and CBS Studios |
| Looking for Alaska | 2019 | Hulu | With Temple Hill Productions and Paramount Television Studios |
| Gossip Girl | 2021–2023 | HBO Max | With Alloy Entertainment, Random Acts Productions, CBS Studios and Warner Bros. Television Studios |
| Tom Swift | 2022 | The CW | With Furious Productions and CBS Studios |
| City on Fire | 2023 | Apple TV+ | With Apple Studios |
| Sterling Point | 2026 | Amazon Prime Video | With LuckyChap, and Amazon MGM Studios |

=== Web series ===
| Title | Year | Website | Note |
|---|---|---|---|
| Rockville, CA | 2009 | The WB | With Expanded Entertainment and Warner Horizon Television |
| Gossip Girl: Chasing Dorota | 2009 | The CW | With Alloy Entertainment, CBS Television Studios and Warner Bros. Television |
