= Larry Teng =

American tv director, producer (born 1977)

- Born: June 12, 1977 (age 49); Queens, New York, U.S.
- Occupations: Television director, television producer
- Years active: 2000–present
- Spouse: Lesley Boone (m. 2005; div. 2013)
- Children: 2

Larry Teng (born June 12, 1977) is an American television director and producer. He is known for his work on Medium, Graceland, Supergirl, Animal Kingdom, Nancy Drew, NCIS: Hawai'i, Walker: Independence and Criminal Minds.

== Education ==
In 1999, Teng graduated with a degree in film from Ithaca College.

== Career ==
Teng has directed and produced for the television series Medium from 2007 to the series end in 2011. He also served as music and post-production supervisor on Ed. His other television directing credits include Hawaii Five-0, Warehouse 13, Person of Interest, Criminal Minds, Supergirl, Common Law, NCIS: Los Angeles, and Elementary. More recently, he signed an overall deal with CBS Studios. He directed the CW pilot of Walker: Independence for CBS Studios.

== Credits ==
Film

Year	Title	Credited as		
Year	Title	Director	Producer	Notes
2019	Ms. Purple	No	Yes	Co-executive producer
2023	Cupcakes	No	Yes	Short film

Television

Year	Title	Credited as		
Year	Title	Director	Producer	Notes
2002–2004	Ed	No	Yes	3 episodes
2005–2011	Medium	Yes	Yes	Directed 7 episodes
2008	The Meant to Be's	No	Yes	TV movie
2012	Person of Interest	Yes	No	Episode: "Baby Blue"
2012	Common Law	Yes	No	Episode: "Performance Anxiety"
2011–2015	Hawaii Five-0	Yes	No	11 episodes
2011–2016	Criminal Minds	Yes	No	10 episodes
2013–2015	NCIS: Los Angeles	Yes	No	5 episodes
2013	Blue Bloods	Yes	No	Episode: "Protest Too Much"
2013–2016	Elementary	Yes	No	7 episodes
2013	Warehouse 13	Yes	No	Episode: "Parks and Rehabilitation"
2013	Burn Notice	Yes	No	Episode: "Psychological Warfare"
2013	Almost Human	Yes	No	Episode: "Are You Receiving?"
2014	Arrow	Yes	No	Episode: "Suicide Squad"
2014–2015	Graceland	Yes	Yes	Directed 5 episodes, co-executive producer
2014	Matador	Yes	No	Episode: "Misanthropology"
2014	Sleepy Hollow	Yes	No	Episode: "The Weeping Lady"
2015–2017	Supergirl	Yes	Yes	Directed 6 episodes, co-executive producer
2016	Criminal Minds: Beyond Borders	Yes	No	Episode: "Whispering Death"
2016	Quantico	Yes	No	Episode: "Yes"
2016–2018	Animal Kingdom	Yes	Yes	Directed 4 episodes, co-executive producer
2016–2018	Lethal Weapon	Yes	No	3 episodes
2017	Bull	Yes	No	Episode: "Dressed to Kill"
2017	Training Day	Yes	No	Episode: "Sunset"
2017–2020	SEAL Team	Yes	No	5 episodes
2017–2018	The Good Doctor	Yes	No	2 episodes, co-executive producer
2017–2018	The Walking Dead	Yes	No	2 episodes
2018–2024	S.W.A.T.	Yes	No	5 episodes
2018–2019	Runaways	Yes	No	2 episodes
2019	Doom Patrol	Yes	No	Episode: "Paw Patrol"
2019	Jessica Jones	Yes	No	Episode: "A.K.A. The Double Half-Wappinger"
2019–2023	Nancy Drew	Yes	Yes	Directed 16 episodes, executive producer
2021–2024	NCIS: Hawai'i	Yes	Yes	Directed 6 episodes, showrunner (Season 1)/executive producer
2022–2023	Walker: Independence	Yes	Yes	Directed 3 episodes, executive producer
2023	So Help Me Todd	Yes	No	Episode: "86'd"
2024-2027	Tracker	Yes	No	3 episodes
2025-2026	Watson	Yes	Yes	Directed 7 episodes
2026	Star Trek: Starfleet Academy	Yes	No	Directed 2 episodes

== Personal life ==
In 2005, Teng married actress Lesley Boone. They divorced in 2013. Larry is a graduate of Herricks High School in New Hyde Park, New York.
