= Melinda Hsu Taylor =

American television writer and producer

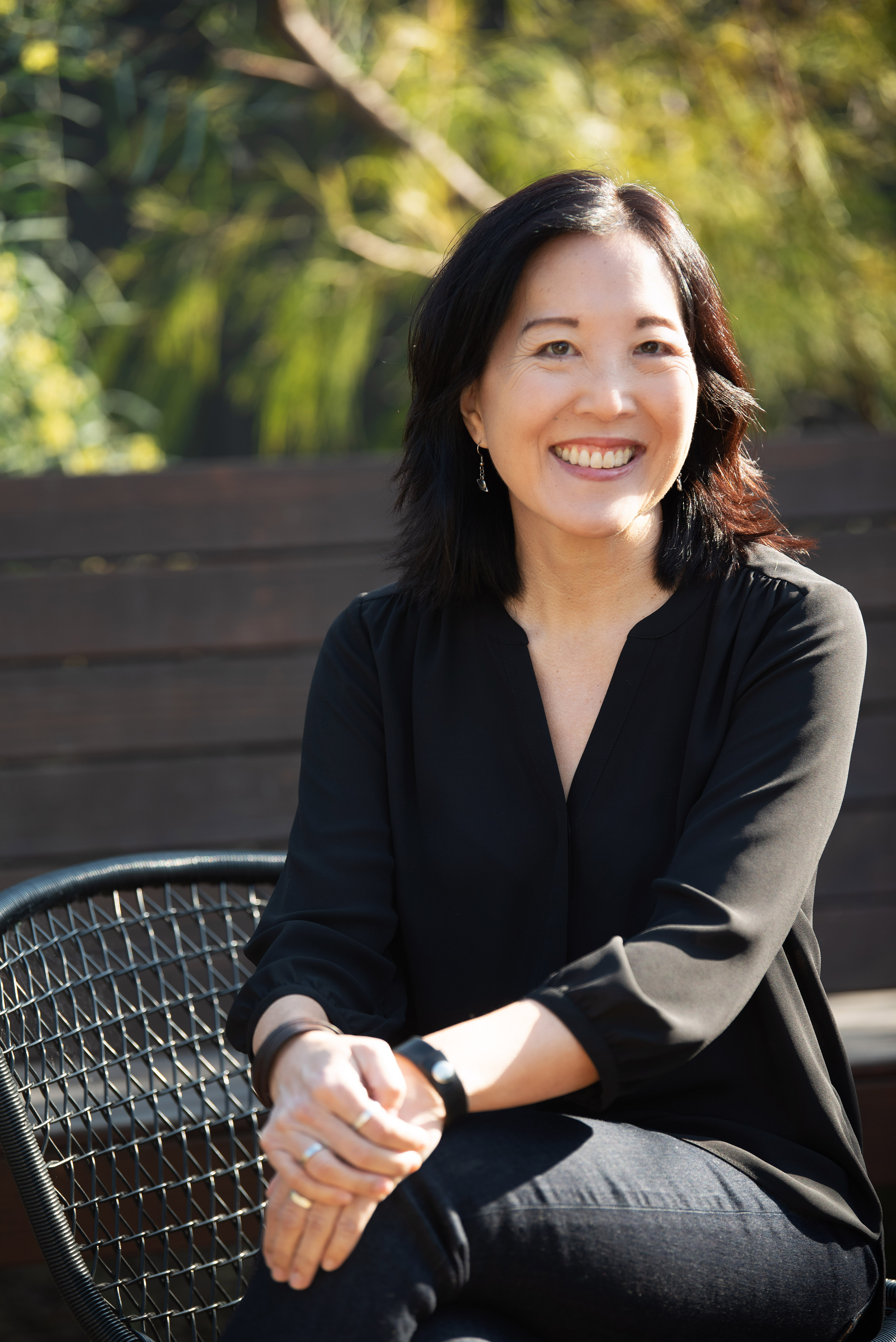
Melinda Hsu in 2023

Melinda Hsu (a.k.a. Melinda Hsu-Taylor) is an American television writer and producer, co-creator and showrunner of Tom Swift and showrunner of Nancy Drew for the CW Network.

Hsu is well known for her work on the ABC series Lost. She was nominated for the Writers Guild of America Award for best drama series for her work on the fifth season of Lost, as well as a 2010 Primetime Emmy Award for the series' sixth and final season. She has also worked as a writer on Medium, Vanished, Women's Murder Club, Falling Skies, Touch, The Vampire Diaries, The Gifted and Nancy Drew.

== Career ==
Melinda Hsu graduated from Harvard College and then earned a MFA in Film from Columbia University. Prior to her work as a staff writer on Still Life (a one-hour drama for the FOX network), she worked as a story analyst for producers, agents, and writers nationwide.

She began working in television as a writer for the first season of Medium in 2005. She wrote the episodes "Jump Start" and "Being Mrs. O'Leary's Cow". She became a story editor for the second season later in 2005 and wrote the episode "Dead Aim". She left the series at the end of the second season in 2006 having written three episodes.

She became an executive story editor for the series Vanished in 2006 and wrote the episode "The New World". Vanished was canceled after thirteen episodes. Hsu moved on to become an executive story editor and writer for the series Women's Murder Club in 2007. She co-wrote the story and the teleplay for the episode "The Past Comes Back to Haunt You" (story with Sherry Carnes, teleplay with Robert Nathan) and wrote the episode "And the Truth Will (Sometimes) Set You Free". The series was cancelled after the first season.

Following her work on the animated series Star Wars: The Clone Wars, Hsu was hired as a co-producer and writer for the fifth season of Lost in 2009. She co-wrote the episodes "The Little Prince" (with producer Brian K. Vaughn) and "Some Like It Hoth" (with Greggory Nations). The writing staff was nominated for the Writers Guild of America Award for best drama series at the February 2010 ceremony for their work on the fifth season. Hsu was promoted to producer for the sixth and final season. She co-wrote the episodes "The Substitute" (with executive producer Elizabeth Sarnoff) and "Ab Aeterno" (with Nations).

After writing for Falling Skies and Touch as a Supervising Producer, she joined the writing staff of The Vampire Diaries. She was an Executive Producer on The Vampire Diaries and Executive Producer on The Gifted as well as the showrunner of Nancy Drew and co-creator and showrunner of Tom Swift, both on the CW.
