= 61st Writers Guild of America Awards =

61st WGA Awards
- Date: February 7, 2009
- Organized by: Writers Guild of America, East; Writers Guild of America, West

The 61st Writers Guild of America Awards honored the best film, television, and video game writers of 2008. Winners were announced on February 7, 2009.

== Nominees ==
Names in bold denote the winners.

=== Film ===
==== Best Adapted Screenplay ====
- The Curious Case of Benjamin Button – Eric Roth (screenplay), Eric Roth and Robin Swicord (story); F. Scott Fitzgerald (author)
- The Dark Knight – Jonathan and Christopher Nolan (screenplay), Christopher Nolan and David S. Goyer (story); Bob Kane and Bill Finger (creators)
- Doubt – John Patrick Shanley (screenplay and playwright)
- Frost/Nixon – Peter Morgan (screenplay and playwright)
- **Slumdog Millionaire – Simon Beaufoy (screenplay); Vikas Swarup (author)** †

==== Best Original Screenplay ====
- Burn After Reading – Joel Coen and Ethan Coen
- **Milk – Dustin Lance Black** †
- Vicky Cristina Barcelona – Woody Allen
- The Visitor – Tom McCarthy
- The Wrestler – Robert Siegel

==== Best Documentary Feature Screenplay ====
- Boogie Man: The Lee Atwater Story - Stefan Forbes and Noland Walker
- Chicago 10 - Brett Morgen
- Fuel - Johnny O'Hara
- Gonzo: The Life and Work of Dr. Hunter S. Thompson - Alex Gibney; from the words of Hunter S. Thompson
- **Waltz with Bashir - Ari Folman**

=== Television ===
==== Dramatic Series ====
Title	Writers	Network
Dexter	Scott Buck, Daniel Cerone, Charles H. Eglee, Drew Greenberg, Adam E. Fierro, Lauren Gussis, Clyde Phillips, Scott Reynolds, Melissa Rosenberg, and Timothy Schlattman	Showtime
Friday Night Lights	Bridget Carpenter, Kerry Ehrin, Brent Fletcher, Jason Gavin, Carter Harris, Elizabeth Heldens, David Hudgins, Jason Katims, Patrick Massett, Aaron Rahsaan Thomas, and John Zinman	NBC
Lost	Carlton Cuse, Drew Goddard, Adam Horowitz, Christina M. Kim, Edward Kitsis, Damon L. Lindelof, Greggory Nations, Kyle Pennington, Elizabeth Sarnoff, and Brian K. Vaughan	ABC
**Mad Men**	**Lisa Albert, Jane Anderson, Rick Cleveland, David Isaacs, Andre Jacquemetton, Maria Jacquemetton, Marti Noxon, Robin Veith, and Matthew Weiner**	AMC
The Wire	Ed Burns, Chris Collins, Dennis Lehane, David Mills, George Pelecanos, Richard Price, David Simon, and William F. Zorzi	HBO

==== Comedy Series ====
Title	Writers	Network
**30 Rock**	**Jack Burditt, Kay Cannon, Robert Carlock, Tina Fey, Donald Glover, Andrew Guest, Matt Hubbard, Jon Pollack, John Riggi, Tami Sagher, and Ron Weiner**	NBC
Entourage	Doug Ellin, Jeremy Miller, Ally Musika, Steve Pink, and Rob Weiss	HBO
The Office	Steve Carell, Jennifer Celotta, Greg Daniels, Lee Eisenberg, Brent Forrester, Dan Goor , Charlie Grandy , Mindy Kaling, Ryan Koh, Lester Lewis, Paul Lieberstein, Warren Lieberstein , B. J. Novak, Michael Schur, Aaron Shure, Gene Stupnitsky, and Halsted Sullivan	NBC
The Simpsons	J. Stewart Burns, Daniel Chun, Joel H. Cohen, Kevin Curran, John Frink, Tom Gammill, Stephanie Gillis, Dan Greaney, Reid Harrison, Al Jean, Billy Kimball, Tim Long, Ian Maxtone-Graham, Bill Odenkirk, Carolyn Omine, Don Payne, Michael Price, Max Pross, Mike Reiss, Mike Scully, Matt Selman, Matt Warburton, Jeff Westbrook, Marc Wilmore, and William Wright	Fox
Weeds	Roberto Benabib, Mark A. Burley, Ron Fitzgerald, David Holstein, Rolin Jones, Brendan Kelly, Jenji Kohan, Victoria Morrow, and Matthew Salsberg	Showtime

==== New Series ====
Title	Writers	Network
Breaking Bad	Vince Gilligan, Peter Gould, Patty Lin, and George Mastras	AMC
Fringe	J. J. Abrams, Jason Cahill, Julia Cho, David H. Goodman, Felicia Henderson, Brad Caleb Kane, Alex Kurtzman, Darin Morgan, J. R. Orci, Roberto Orci, Jeff Pinkner, and Zack Whedon	Fox
**In Treatment**	**Rodrigo García, Bryan Goluboff, Davey Holmes, William Meritt Johnson, Amy Lippman, and Sarah Treem**	HBO
Life On Mars	Josh Appelbaum, Andre Nemec, Scott Rosenberg, Becky Hartman Edwards, David Wilcox, Adele Lim, Bryan Oh, Tracy McMillan, Sonny Postiglione, Phil M. Rosenberg, and Meredith Averill	ABC
True Blood	Alan Ball, Brian Buckner, Raelle Tucker, Alexander Woo, Nancy Oliver, and Chris Offutt	HBO

==== Episodic Drama ====
Title	Series	Writers	Network
"Don't Ever Change"	House	Doris Egan & Leonard Dick	Fox
"Double Booked"	Burn Notice	Craig O'Neill & Jason Tracey	USA
"Gray Matter"	Breaking Bad	Patty Lin	AMC
**"Pilot"**	**Breaking Bad**	**Vince Gilligan**	AMC
"Pilot"	Eli Stone	Greg Berlanti & Marc Guggenheim	ABC
"There's Something About Harry"	Dexter	Scott Reynolds	Showtime

==== Episodic Comedy ====
Title	Series	Writers	Network
"Believe in the Stars"	30 Rock	Robert Carlock	NBC
"Cooter"	30 Rock	Tina Fey	NBC
"Crime Aid"	The Office	Charlie Grandy	NBC
"Crush'd"	Ugly Betty	Tracy Poust & Jon Kinnally	ABC
**"Succession"**	**30 Rock**	**Andrew Guest & John Riggi**	NBC
"Vote for This and I Promise to Do Something Crazy at the Emmys"	My Name Is Earl	Greg Garcia	NBC

==== Long Form - Original ====
Title	Writers	Network
An American Crime	Tommy O'Haver & Irene Turner	Showtime
Pilot (Fringe)	J. J. Abrams, Alex Kurtzman & Roberto Orci	Fox
**Recount**	**Danny Strong**	HBO

==== Long Form - Adaptation ====
Title	Writers	Network
Generation Kill	"Stay Frosty" - Teleplay by Ed Burns, Story by David Simon & Ed Burns, Based on the book by Evan Wright "Bomb in the Garden" - Teleplay by David Simon, Story by David Simon & Ed Burns, Based on the book by Evan Wright	HBO
**John Adams**	"Join or Die" & "Independence" - Teleplay by **Kirk Ellis**; Based on the book by David McCullough)	HBO
The Memory Keeper's Daughter	Teleplay by John Pielmeier; Based on the book by Kim Edwards	Lifetime

==== Animation ====
Title	Series	Writers	Network
**"Apocalypse Cow"**	**The Simpsons**	**Jeff Westbrook**	Fox
"The Debarted"	The Simpsons	Joel H. Cohen	FOX
"E Pluribus Wiggum"	The Simpsons	Michael Price	FOX
"Homer and Lisa Exchange Cross Words"	The Simpsons	Tim Long	FOX
"Life: A Loser's Manual"	King of the Hill	Dan McGrath	FOX
"Strangeness on a Train"	King of the Hill	Jim Dauterive	FOX

==== Comedy/Variety (Including Talk) Series ====
Title	Writers	Network
Late Night with Conan O'Brien	Writers Mike Sweeney, Chris Albers, Jose Arroyo, Dan Cronin, Kevin Dorff, Daniel J. Goor, Michael Gordon, Berkley Johnson, Brian Kiley, Michael Koman, Brian McCann, Guy Nicolucci, Conan O'Brien, Matt O'Brien, Robert Smigel, Brian Stack, and Andrew Weinberg	NBC
Late Show with David Letterman	Head Writers Eric Stangel, Justin Stangel, Writers Michael Barrie, Jim Mulholland, Steve Young, Tom Ruprecht, Lee Ellenberg, Matt Roberts, Jeremy Weiner, Joe Grossman, Bill Scheft, Bob Borden, Frank Sebastiano, and David Letterman	CBS
Real Time with Bill Maher	Written by Scott Carter, Adam Felber, Matt Gunn, Brian Jacobsmeyer, Jay Jaroch, Chris Kelly, Bill Maher, Billy Martin, and Danny Vermont	HBO
**Saturday Night Live**	**Head Writers Seth Meyers, Paula Pell, Andrew Steele, Writers Doug Abeles, James Anderson, Alex Baze, James Downey, Charlie Grandy, Steve Higgins, Colin Jost, Erik Kenward, Rob Klein, John Lutz, Lorne Michaels, John Mulaney, Simon Rich, Marika Sawyer, Akiva Schaffer, Robert Smigel, John Solomon, Emily Spivey, Kent Sublette, Jorma Taccone, Bryan Tucker, Additional Sketches by Robert Carlock**	NBC
The Colbert Report	Head Writers Allison Silverman, Tom Purcell, and Rich Dahm, Writers Bryan Adams, Michael Brumm, Stephen Colbert, Rob Dubbin, Glenn Eichler, Peter Grosz, Peter Gwinn, Barry Julien, Laura Krafft, Jay Katsir, Frank Lesser, and Meredith Scardino	Comedy Central
The Daily Show with Jon Stewart	Head Writer Steve Bodow, Writers Rory Albanese, Rachel Axler, Kevin Bleyer, Rich Blomquist, Tim Carvell, Wyatt Cenac, J.R. Havlan, DJ Javerbaum, Rob Kutner, Josh Lieb, Sam Means, John Oliver, Jason Ross and Jon Stewart	Comedy Central

==== Comedy/Variety – Music, Awards, Tributes – Specials ====
Title	Writers	Network
2008 Film Independent Spirit Awards	**Written by Billy Kimball, Aaron Lee, Jennifer Celotta, and Rainn Wilson**	IFC/AMC
Jimmy Kimmel's Big Night of Stars	Written by Jimmy Kimmel, Gary Greenberg, Molly McNearney, Bryan Paulk, Ned Rice, Jon Bines, Will Burke, Rick Rosner, Jake Lentz, Sal Iacono, and Tony Barbieri	ABC

==== Daytime Serials ====
Title	Writers	Network
**As the World Turns**	**Written by Jean Passanante, Leah Laiman, Courtney Simon, Lisa Connor, David A. Levinson, Peter Brash, Richard Culliton, Susan Dansby, Cheryl Davis, and Leslie Nipkow**	CBS Daytime
One Life to Live	Written by Ron Carlivati, Carolyn Culliton, Elizabeth Page, Aida Croal, Shelly Altman, Janet Iacobuzio, Chris Van Etten, Anna Theresa Cascio	ABC Daytime

==== Children's ====
===== Episodic & Specials =====
Title	Series	Writers	Network
"Elmo's Christmas Countdown"	Sesame Workshop	Written by Joey Mazzarino	ABC
"Spencer's 18th Birthday"	South of Nowhere	Written by Arika Lisanne Mittman	The N
"The Un-Party"	Imagination Movers	Written by Scott C. Gray & Rick Gitelson	Disney Channel

===== Long Form or Special =====
Title	Series	Writers	Network
"Polar Bears"	The Naked Brothers Band	Written by Polly Draper	Nickelodeon

==== Documentary ====
===== Current events =====
Title	Series	Writers	Network
"Bush's War: Part One"	Frontline	Written by Michael Kirk	PBS
Depression: Out of the Shadows		Written by Larkin McPhee	PBS
"Judgment Day: Intelligent Design on Trial"	NOVA	Written by Joseph McMaster	PBS
"Rules of Engagement"	Frontline	Written by Arun Rath	PBS
"The Medicated Child"	Frontline	Written by Marcela Gaviria	PBS

===== Other than current events =====
Title	Series	Writers	Network
Andrew Jackson: Good, Evil, and the Presidency		Written by Carl Byker	PBS
"Kit Carson"	American Experience	Written by Michelle Ferrari	PBS
"Secrets of the Parthenon"	NOVA	Written by Gary Glassman	PBS
Episode Two: "The Best of Times, The Worst of Times (1924-1945),"	The Jewish Americans	Written by David Grubin	PBS
The Truth about Cancer		Written by Linda Garmon	PBS

==== News ====
===== Regularly scheduled, bulletin, or breaking report =====
Title	Series	Writers	Network
ABC Weekend News		Joel Siegel, Karen Mooney, and David Muir	ABC
"Up to the Minute"	CBS News	Matt Nelko	CBS

===== Analysis, feature, or commentary =====
Title	Series	Writers	Network
"Exonerated"	60 Minutes	Tom Anderson and Jenny Dubin	CBS
"Show Me the Love: Amazing Pen Pal Connection"	Good Morning America	Raquel Hecker	ABC
"The Warren Buffett Challenge: Are the Rich Taxed Enough?"	Good Morning America	Lisa Ferri	ABC
"Yankee Stadium and the New Gilded Age"	Bill Moyers Journal	Bill Moyers & Michael Winship	PBS

=== Video games ===
==== Videogame Writing ====
- **Star Wars: The Force Unleashed - Haden Blackman, Shawn Pitman, John Stafford and Cameron Suey**
- Command & Conquer: Red Alert 3 - Writer Haris Orkin, story producer Mical Pedriana
- Dangerous High School Girls in Trouble! - Writing Keith Nemitz, additional writing Adrianne Ambrose
- Fallout 3 - Lead Writer Emil Pagliarulo, quest writing Erik J. Caponi, Brian Chapin, Jon Paul Duvall, Kurt Kuhlmann, Alan Nanes, Bruce Nesmith and Fred Zeleny, additional quest writing Nate Ellis, William Killeen, Mark Nelson and Justin McSweeney
- Tomb Raider: Underworld - Story Eric Lindstrom and Toby Gard, screenplay Eric Lindstrom

== Paul Selwin Civil Rights Award ==
- Dustin Lance Black, "to the member whose script best embodies the spirit of constitutional and civil rights and liberties."
