= Stranger in a Strange Land (Lost) =

- Lost episode
- Episode no.: Season 3 Episode 9
- Directed by: Paris Barclay
- Written by: Elizabeth Sarnoff; Christina M. Kim
- Production code: 309
- Original air date: February 21, 2007
- Running time: 43 minutes

Guest appearances
- Bai Ling as Achara; M. C. Gainey as Tom Friendly; Tania Raymonde as Alex; Blake Bashoff as Karl; Diana Scarwid as Isabel; Kimberley Joseph as Cindy Chandler; James Huang as Chet; Siwathep Sunapo as Thai man; Shannon Chanhthanam as Boy; Mickey Graue as Zack; Kiersten Havelock as Emma

Episode chronology
← Previous "Flashes Before Your Eyes"	Next → "Tricia Tanaka Is Dead"
- Lost season 3

"Stranger in a Strange Land" is the ninth episode of the third season of the American drama television series Lost, and the show's 58th episode overall. The episode was written by Elizabeth Sarnoff and Christina M. Kim, and directed by Paris Barclay. It first aired in the United States on February 21, 2007, on ABC.

In the episode, Kate Austen (Evangeline Lilly), Karl (Blake Bashoff), and James "Sawyer" Ford (Josh Holloway) continue to journey back to the beach camp, while Jack Shephard (Matthew Fox) and Alex (Tania Raymonde) must save Juliet Burke (Elizabeth Mitchell) from execution. Flashbacks reveal the origin of Jack's tattoos.

== Plot ==
=== Flashbacks ===
In flashbacks, Jack is in Phuket, Thailand, where he meets a local woman named Achara (Bai Ling); the two soon enter into a relationship. After finding out that she works in a tattoo parlor and claims to be able to see who people really are, Jack demands that she give him a tattoo. Achara is hesitant to give him a tattoo, but she does so anyway and tells him there will be consequences. The next morning, he is beaten up by her brother and other locals and told to leave.

=== On the Island ===
Sawyer and Kate begin the episode on Alex's canoe with an unconscious Karl, paddling away from Hydra island. Kate suggests returning for Jack; however, Sawyer refuses. Kate and Sawyer land on the main island and question Karl about the Others. Karl reveals that the Others work on the Hydra island, but live on the main island. The next morning, Sawyer finds Karl crying in the jungle. Karl says that he is crying because he misses Alex. Sawyer asks Karl if he is in love, which Karl affirms to be true. Sawyer tells him that love is worth the risks of getting caught by the Others and lets Karl go into the jungle to find Alex.

Jack is put into the bear cage, and notices a handcuffed Juliet being led to his old prison. She visits him later and asks Jack to treat Ben's back, which has become infected following the surgery, but Jack refuses. She also explains that she is in trouble with the Others for killing Pickett. Later, Isabel (Diana Scarwid), the Others' "sheriff," arrives at the cage and discusses Jack's tattoo with him, as she can read the Chinese. Isabel brings him to a room where Juliet is being held and asks him whether Juliet told him to kill Ben or not. Jack lies and says she did not and is brought back to his cage. Once back, he is visited by Cindy Chandler (Kimberley Joseph) and the previously kidnapped members of the tail-section. Cindy starts to ask Jack questions, saying they are here to "watch", but he angrily sends her away. Alex visits Jack later and tells him that the Others are planning to execute Juliet. Alex helps him escape from his cage, and they go to Ben Linus (Michael Emerson), who writes a note, sparing Juliet, in return for Jack's continuing to be Ben's doctor. The two then go to a trial the Others are holding for Juliet, and Alex gives Isabel Ben's note, which says Juliet is not to be executed, but is to be marked instead (with an 8-point asterisk at the base of her spine). When Juliet later asks Jack why he helped her, he replies that it is because Ben said he would let both of them off the island and he wants to make that happen by working together. At the end of the episode, Jack and the Others travel back to the main island on a boat. Just before leaving, Isabel translates Jack's tattoo, "He walks amongst us, but he is not one of us". Jack replies, "That's what they say, that's not what they mean."

== Production ==
"Stranger in a Strange Land" was the first episode of the series directed by Paris Barclay. Barclay had previously won two Emmy Awards for directing episodes of NYPD Blue. The episode was written by Elizabeth Sarnoff and Christina M. Kim, the pair had previously worked together on the second season episodes "The Hunting Party", "The Whole Truth", and "Two for the Road".

Although Jack had tattoos on his arm the entire series, their origin had never been explained. Matthew Fox received the tattoos before Lost was even created. The producers considered putting make-up over them, but instead, decided just to keep them and fit it in with the plot. According to Assistant Professor Xinping Zhu of Northeastern University, the tattoo is made up of four Chinese characters from a poem written by Mao Zedong in 1925. Fox's tattoo translates to "Eagles high up, cleaving the space". (In this episode however, one of "the Others" tells Jack that his tattoo translates as: "He walks among us, but he is not one of us." Jack replies, "That's what they say, that's not what they mean.") The number 5 can also be seen on Fox's forearm; he got that tattoo while working on Party of Five, along with another cast member. In an interview, Fox said that for him, getting a tattoo was a "pretty intense experience", and something he would not do in the "spur of the moment". He thought Jack having tattoos was a "really cool idea". Since Fox used tattoos to represent memories or meaningful events in his life, the writers took a similar approach when dealing with Jack's tattoos.

"Stranger in a Strange Land" was shot in various places on the island of Oahu. The scenes with Kate, Sawyer, and Karl on the canoe were shot in Kāne'ohe Bay, while the flashback beach scenes were filmed on Waimanalo Beach. The shots of Jack in a cage were done in Oahu's Paradise Park. The Others' tank and operating room are located in a film studio on the island. Bai Ling, who played Achara, recalled that when shooting the sex scene between her character and Jack, she was "kind of nervous" because she did not know Fox very well. Ling recalls that "we (she and Fox) both had a mutual understanding to just go for it. Sometimes I'm on top of him, sometimes he's on top of me."

== Reception ==
"Stranger in a Strange Land" was watched by 12.95 million Americans, ranking Lost as the 21st most watched program of the week. This was an increase in viewers from the previous episode, making Lost the number one scripted television series in the adults 18-49 category for the third consecutive week. The episode garnered more viewers than other television series' showing at the same time on other networks, including Criminal Minds and CSI: NY. The ratings, however, were a decrease compared to the same time the previous year, when the episode "One of Them" garnered 18.20 million Americans.

"Stranger in a Strange Land" garnered many negative reviews from critics. Chris Carabott, a writer for IGN, wrote that "the episode was "nothing more than a transition episode". Carabott felt that although it was "a necessary evil in episodic television like Lost", it did not "excuse the poor execution and uninteresting story". IGN later chose it as the worst episode of the series, describing it as "pointless and boring". Cinemablend.com's Josh Spiegel claimed that the episode "was the first rough patch of an otherwise very good third season." Spiegel went on to write that although previews for "Stranger in a Strange Land" promised that three questions would be answered, they were not the mysteries he had been worried about. Mac Slocum of Filmfodder.com was upset about the "overblown marketing" which failed to deliver the answers that he wanted.

"Stranger in a Strange Land" is widely considered amongst Lost fans as the worst episode of the series, and was even recognized as such by show runner Damon Lindelof in an interview. It was part of the inspiration to set an end date for the series.
