= Maternity Leave (Lost) =

- Lost episode
- Episode no.: Season 2 Episode 15
- Directed by: Jack Bender
- Written by: Dawn Lambertsen Kelly; Matt Ragghianti
- Cinematography by: Michael Bonvillain
- Editing by: Stephen Semel
- Production code: 215
- Original air date: March 1, 2006
- Running time: 45 minutes

Guest appearances
- Michael Emerson as Henry Gale; Mira Furlan as Danielle Rousseau; M. C. Gainey as Other; William Mapother as Ethan Rom; Tania Raymonde as Alex

Episode chronology
← Previous "One of Them"	Next → "The Whole Truth"
- Lost season 2

"Maternity Leave" is the 15th episode of the second season of the American drama television series Lost, and the 40th episode overall. The episode was directed by Jack Bender, and written by Dawn Lambertsen Kelly and Matt Ragghianti. It first aired on ABC in the United States on March 1, 2006. The character of Claire Littleton (Emilie de Ravin) is featured in the episode's flashbacks, revealing what happened when she was kidnapped by Ethan, an Other.

"Maternity Leave" was seen by an estimated 16.43 million American household viewers. It received mixed-to-positive reviews from critics, with praise for the mysteries further revealed in the episode, while its rote plot development was criticized.

== Plot ==
Aaron becomes ill with a rash and fever, and Claire sets off in the night to find Jack Shephard (Matthew Fox). John Locke (Terry O'Quinn) intercedes and goes instead of her. While Locke is gone, Danielle Rousseau (Mira Furlan) appears and tells Claire that Aaron is "infected."

Claire then remembers being injected with a needle while pregnant. Kate Austen (Evangeline Lilly) sends Rousseau away, though Claire is now convinced that something is seriously wrong with Aaron.

Jack assures Claire that Aaron is fine and the fever will break, but she is unsure. Claire speaks to Libby (Cynthia Watros), who helps her recall memories from the two weeks when she was abducted by an Other named Ethan (William Mapother). Claire remembers what resembles a doctor's office and Ethan giving her injections. She was confused (apparently drugged) during this entire ordeal, and believed that she was still in Australia and about to leave for the United States.

Claire enlists Kate to help her reach Rousseau, and to find a vaccine she remembered from her memories, believing that it is the cure for Aaron's ailment. Claire later remembers Ethan giving her injections before leading her to a baby room.

She also remembers Ethan talking to an other (M. C. Gainey). The other is unhappy that Claire was brought to the facility, as "the list" had not been prepared. He also mentions that a higher authority will not be pleased. Ethan responds that the survivors had a passenger manifest and knew that he was not on the plane.

Claire and Kate find Rousseau, who takes them to the place where she found Claire the night of Claire's return to the camp. There, Claire wants Rousseau to take her to the room with the vaccine and grows accusatory of Rousseau aiding her abduction when Rousseau claims she does not know where the room is.

Claire then notices a stump in the jungle that triggers another memory; she remembers Ethan talking about leaving the baby with his group when they had a walk out of the facility. Ethan says that she does have a choice in the matter. Ethan gives Claire water from a canteen, and she complains of the sour taste. Ethan says that Claire's baby is one of the "good ones."

Investigating further, the three women find a concealed bunker with the DHARMA logo on it. Unlike the swan symbol in the DHARMA logo on the Facility 3 bunker, the symbol on this bunker is a caduceus. Inside, all but one of the lights are out and the bunker appears to be abandoned. Claire reaches rooms familiar to her memories, finds a bootie she crocheted during her time there and puts it in her pack. Investigating another part of the bunker, Kate discovers a set of lockers. Upon opening one, she finds tattered clothes, a box containing makeup, theatrical glue, and a beard — all parts of the disguise worn by the other in her previous encounter with him.

Claire locates the refrigerator where the vaccine was stored; it is now empty. She has a flashback of a teenaged girl (Tania Raymonde) who rescues her from the bunker, saying that the Others plan to take the baby and kill Claire.

Back in the jungle, Claire remembers that Rousseau aided her escape, and was not part of the group that kidnapped her. Claire tells Rousseau of the girl with blue eyes that helped her escape, implying it might be Rousseau’s daughter, Alexandra. Rousseau, on the verge of tears, warns Claire that if Aaron is infected, she knows what she will have to do. Claire and Kate return to camp, where Jack reveals that Aaron's fever has subsided. Claire then takes out the bootie and gives it to Aaron.

Meanwhile, Jack and Locke try to decide what to do about Henry Gale (Michael Emerson). Locke gives Henry a copy of the Fyodor Dostoyevsky novel The Brothers Karamazov. Later, Locke tells Jack that Ernest Hemingway wanted to be the greatest writer in the world, but felt that he could never escape being in the shadow of Dostoyevsky.

Mr. Eko (Adewale Akinnuoye-Agbaje) visits the bunker during this time and figures out what is going on. He asks Jack to let him see the prisoner, alone. Jack agrees after Eko threatens to tell the rest of the camp about Henry. Eko tells Henry about the two men he killed when they tried to abduct him from his camp. Eko then threateningly takes out his knife, cuts two knots out of his beard, and leaves.

Locke brings dinner to Henry, who strikes up a conversation about Hemingway and Dostoyevsky. Henry heard the talk about the authors through the walls. Henry asks Locke which of the authors he relates to more, but Locke does not have an answer. He then asks why Locke lets Jack call the shots, but Locke insists that he and Jack make decisions together. Locke locks up Henry and returns to the bunker's kitchen, where he loses his temper and violently sweeps the dishes off the counter (which can be heard by Henry).

== Production ==
Tania Raymonde was told her character would be called "Jessica" when first cast in the role, and her character was promoted as a survivor who would be introduced in "Maternity Leave'. Cast members often read fake lines with a different name in their audition to limit potential spoilers from leaking. In her first appearance, Raymonde was credited as "young girl", preventing viewers knowing in advance that Alex would be introduced.

== Reception ==
16.43 million American viewers watched "Maternity Leave" live.

Writing in 2008 for IGN, Chris Carabott gave the episode a grade of 7.5 out of 10 and commended the further revelations about the Others, though he pointed out that it is still slight enough that casual viewers could understandably be frustrated. Alan Sepinwall considered "Maternity Leave" a notable improvement over the previous episode, "One of Them", stating that the former had "[m]ystery revelations that were actually useful". Daniel MacEachern of Television Without Pity gave the episode a B+.

However, in another IGN article in 2014, Eric Goldman ranked "Maternity Leave" as 95th out of all the episodes of Lost, emphasizing the routine quality of the plot with the onomatopoeic "Zzzzzz", which indicates snoring.
