= Greggory Nations =

American screenwriter

Greggory "Gregg" Nations is an American television writer and script coordinator. He wrote several episodes for The District and Nash Bridges with Carlton Cuse. Nations is a co-producer of the television show Lost, and created its Bible after re-reading the scripts and creating a timeline.

He was nominated for a Writers Guild of America Award for Best Dramatic Series at the February 2009 ceremony for his work on the fourth season of Lost. The writing staff was nominated for the award again at the February 2010 ceremony for their work on the fifth season.

== Lost episodes ==
- "Eggtown" (Season 4, Episode 4) with Elizabeth Sarnoff
- Lafleur (saison 5, épisode 8)
- "Some Like It Hoth" (Season 5, Episode 13) with Melinda Hsu Taylor
- "Ab Aeterno" (Season 6, Episode 9) with Melinda Hsu Taylor
