= One of Us (Lost) =

- Lost episode
- Episode no.: Season 3 Episode 16
- Directed by: Jack Bender
- Written by: Carlton Cuse; Drew Goddard
- Production code: 316
- Original air date: April 11, 2007
- Running time: 43 minutes

Guest appearances
- Nestor Carbonell as Richard Alpert; Brett Cullen as Goodwin; Andrew Divoff as Mikhail Bakunin; William Mapother as Ethan Rom; Robin Weigert as Rachel Carlson; Kristen Gregg as Cindy Keiker; Joah Buley as Luke; Tyrone Howard as Airport guard

Episode chronology
← Previous "Left Behind"	Next → "Catch-22"
- Lost season 3

"One of Us" is the 16th episode of the third season of Lost. It aired on April 11, 2007, making it the 65th episode of the series. The episode was written by Carlton Cuse and Drew Goddard and directed by Jack Bender. The title of the episode is not only a reference to the season two episode titled "One of Them", it is also a major theme of the episode, as Jack tries to convince the other flight survivors that Juliet is "one of us", rather than an Other.

The character of Dr. Juliet Burke (Elizabeth Mitchell) is featured in the episode's flashbacks, which reveal how Juliet got on the Island and why she went to the island in the first place. While on the island, Jack Shephard (Matthew Fox), Kate Austen (Evangeline Lilly), Sayid Jarrah (Naveen Andrews) and Juliet trek back to the beach camp, and Claire Littleton (Emilie de Ravin) is struck by a mysterious illness. Andrew Divoff, William Mapother, Brett Cullen and Nestor Carbonell again reprise their recurring roles as Others; Mikhail Bakunin, Ethan Rom, Goodwin and Richard Alpert. The Island events in this episode take place between December 13 and December 15, 2004.

== Plot ==
=== Flashbacks ===
On September 22, 2001, Juliet arrives at an airport with her sister, where Richard Alpert and Ethan Rom are there to escort her the rest of the way. Juliet says good-bye to her sister, Rachel, promising to be back before her baby is born. In the airport terminal, Alpert pours sedative into a glass of orange juice and gives it to Juliet to drink, explaining that the trip is very intense. Juliet is wary of drinking the juice, even though she is okay with the other circumstances surrounding the trip. Alpert interrupts and tells her the place she is going is very special and that she has a gift with which she is supposed to do something significant. Juliet drinks the orange juice and passes out. She wakes up in a submarine with her arms and waist strapped down for safety.

She then moves out onto a dock, where she meets Ben Linus. Juliet is shown operating with Ethan and Goodwin (Brett Cullen) on a pregnant patient, Sabine, who dies; she is comforted by Goodwin. Juliet meets with Ben, and explains her theory that the problems with pregnant women happen at conception. She wants to test this theory by having a woman conceive off the island, but Ben refuses to let anyone off the island. When Juliet tells him that nothing else can be done and asks to go home and be with her sister, Ben informs Juliet that her sister's cancer has come back. He offers her a choice: either Juliet can go home and be with her sister as she dies, or she can stay and he will have Jacob cure her sister's cancer.

Almost 3 years later, Juliet is in bed after sleeping with Goodwin. Afterwards, she is given x-rays of Ben's back, and when she determines that Ben has a tumor, she confronts him and accuses him of lying about curing Rachel. He denies lying to her and refuses to let her go home. The next day, immediately after Flight 815 crashes, Ben takes Juliet to the Flame Station to see Mikhail. Ben tells Mikhail that he wants information on all of the passengers of the plane, then asks him to bring up a live feed. On the screen a newspaper is shown with the current date, September 22, 2004, followed by a shot of Rachel playing with her child (Rachel named her son Julian, presumably after Juliet) in a playground, and Ben explains that her cancer is in complete remission.

The final flashback is Juliet's remembering of Ben and herself discussing their plans immediately before the events of "Left Behind". Ben tells her to handcuff herself to Kate and say she was left behind. She is also told that Claire's "implant" has been "activated" and that this will make Claire ill. Juliet is to use drugs left at the drop point to cure her and earn the trust of the survivors; Ben gives her a gas mask and leaves.

=== On the Island ===
Jack Shephard, Kate Austen, Sayid Jarrah and Juliet Burke move back to the beach camp. As they stop for the night, Jack explains to Kate the deal he made with Ben Linus (Michael Emerson). Sayid attempts to interrogate Juliet, but Jack intervenes and defends her. At the beach camp, Charlie Pace (Dominic Monaghan) hears Claire Littleton's baby, Aaron, crying and wakes up Claire. Claire says she is not feeling well, so Charlie offers to take care of Aaron. James "Sawyer" Ford (Josh Holloway) sees Jack, Kate, and Sayid returning. Though happy about their return, he expresses his displeasure at seeing Juliet.

Hugo "Hurley" Reyes (Jorge Garcia) engages Juliet in casual conversation. Juliet guesses that Hurley was sent to keep an eye on her. He tells her the last Other who came over, Ethan, was killed and buried nearby.

That night, Jack tells everyone that he trusts Juliet and that should be enough, but Sayid disagrees. Jack continues to explain that John Locke blew up the submarine that was to take him home. Claire suddenly collapses with blood gushing from her face. Juliet takes Jack and Kate aside and tells them she knows what's wrong with Claire because she did it to her. At the camp, Juliet explains that Claire's immune system has turned against her due to a latent reaction to medication in her bloodstream. The medication was designed by Juliet to keep Claire alive during her pregnancy. She was brought to the island to find out why women couldn't have children. The mother's body treats the pregnancy as a foreign invader and the immune system attacks; every pregnant woman on the island has died. Claire was the first to survive even though she showed some of the symptoms.

Juliet explains that Ethan kept a stash of the serum at a nearby drop point. She goes out into the jungle and retrieves the serum, but Sayid and Sawyer have followed her, and they want answers. Juliet tells them there is no time, and realizing they are not going to budge, she stands up to them and says she finds it interesting that they are the camp's moral police, considering their violent pasts. She takes the serum back to the beach and gives it to Jack. He warns her that if anything happens to Claire, he will not be able to protect her against the will of the survivors any longer and she would be alone, to which Juliet states that she already is. At the camp, Claire wakes up. She is feeling and looking much better. Juliet is now on the path to being trusted by the survivors. Jack brings her supplies to set up her tent area and tells her eventually everyone will need answers. Juliet asks why Jack trusts her and does not ask for answers. He says because when the submarine exploded, he saw in her eyes that she wanted to get off this island more than anything. That makes her "one of us". Later, while setting up her shelter and remembering her last conversation with Ben, Juliet looks around the camp and ties a final double knot as Jack smiles at her.

== Production ==
"One of Us" was the nineteenth episode directed by Jack Bender. It was written by Carlton Cuse and Drew Goddard; the pair had never before collaborated on an episode.

As usual, the scenes on the beach (the survivors camp) were shot at Oahu's Papa'iloa Beach, while the island scenes were actually filmed at the Waialua Mauka Ranches. The Mittelos secure building exterior scenes were shot at the Honolulu Advertiser Production and Distribution Building. Most of the scenes displaying the Others' camp were shot at the Hawaii Film Studio, with the exception of the barracks which were filmed at YMCA Camp Erdman. The inside of the submarine was filmed inside the USS Bowfin at the USS Arizona Memorial in Pearl Harbor, Hawaii.

The song "Downtown" by Petula Clark appears in flashbacks. It had previously appeared in the season 3 premier, "A Tale of Two Cities".

== Reception ==
"One of Us" was watched by 12.09 million Americans, ranking Lost as the twentieth most watched program of the week. Lost defeated CBS' CSI: NY by 53% among adults 18-49, the largest ever margin of victory for Lost over CSI: NY in original episodes. The ratings were also an increase over the previous episode, and improved the timeslot by 5.7 million viewers over the same night last year. Lost was the fifth most watched program for the week in the key adults 18-49 demographic, achieving 5.2 million viewers. In the United Kingdom, the episode attracted 1.09 million viewers, and was the second most watched program of the week on the non-terrestrial channels, beaten only by Live FA Cup Football.

Reviewer Chris Carabott of IGN rated the episode with an 8.7 out of 10, commenting that "One of Us" was "yet another solid effort from long-time Lost director Jack Bender who deserves credit for bringing us some of the best episodes the series has to offer. Bender has helmed "Walkabout", "Man of Science, Man of Faith" and this season's best "The Man from Tallahassee" just to name a few".

Mitchell submitted this episode for consideration for Outstanding Supporting Actress in a Drama Series at the 59th Primetime Emmy Awards.
