= Ragghianti =

Ragghianti is a surname. Notable people with the surname include:

- Carlo Ludovico Ragghianti (1910–1987), Italian art critic, historian, philosopher of art and politician
- Marie Ragghianti (born 1942), American parole board administrator
- Matt Ragghianti, American television writer
