= Some Like It Hoth =

- Lost episode
- Miles Straume and Hugo "Hurley" Reyes discuss rewriting The Empire Strikes Back.
- Episode no.: Season 5 Episode 13
- Directed by: Jack Bender
- Written by: Melinda Hsu Taylor; Greggory Nations
- Production code: 513
- Original air date: April 15, 2009
- Running time: 43 minutes

Guest appearances
- François Chau as Dr. Pierre Chang; Marsha Thomason as Naomi Dorrit; Doug Hutchison as Horace Goodspeed; Patrick Fischler as Phil; Jon Gries as Roger Linus; Eric Lange as Stuart Radzinsky; Leslie Ishii as Lara Chang; Brad William Henke as Bram; Dean Norris as Howard Gray; Tim DeZarn as Trevor; Lance Ho as Young Miles Straume; Linda Rose Herman as Evelyn; Simon Elbing as Glenn; Cody Gomes as Worker

Episode chronology
← Previous "Dead Is Dead"	Next → "The Variable"
- Lost season 5

"Some Like It Hoth" is the 13th television episode of the fifth season of ABC's Lost. The 99th episode of the show overall, "Some Like It Hoth" aired on April 15, 2009, on ABC in the United States. The episode was written by co-producer Melinda Hsu Taylor and "Eggtown" writer Greggory Nations and directed by Jack Bender. The title is a reference to the 1959 film Some Like It Hot and the fictional planet Hoth in the Star Wars universe.

In 1977, Miles Straume (Ken Leung) and Hugo "Hurley" Reyes (Jorge Garcia) deliver a package to a top Dharma official. Meanwhile, a security breach is being suspected after young Ben has disappeared. In flashbacks, Miles is recruited by Naomi Dorrit (Marsha Thomason) to go to the island.

== Plot ==
=== Flashbacks ===
As a child, Miles discovers that he can hear the voices of dead people, so long as their bodies are nearby. When his mother, Lara (Leslie Ishii), is dying of cancer years later, Miles questions her about his father. She says that his father died when Miles was still a baby and that he never cared about her or Miles. Miles is later employed by a man (Dean Norris) to speak with his dead son. Since the boy's body was cremated, Miles lies and says that the boy knew his father loved him. Miles is eventually approached by Naomi Dorrit (Marsha Thomason) who, after ascertaining that he is not a fraud, offers him $1.6 million to go to the island on the freighter. He agrees; however, he is later kidnapped by people who claim that the owner of the freighter, Charles Widmore (Alan Dale), is on the "wrong team." Miles says he will not go to the island if they can provide him double the money ($3.2 million, the amount Miles asks for in "Eggtown"). Their leader, Bram (Brad William Henke), who is later a passenger on Ajira Airways Flight 316, asks Miles the question, "What lies in the shadow of the statue?" Miles cannot answer, so he tells Miles that he will not be ready to go to the island until he can. They then let Miles go. Miles later returns the money he was paid by the dead son's father, admitting that he lied and saying that the man should have told his son that he loved him before he died.

=== 1977 ===
Following the events of "Whatever Happened, Happened", Kate Austen (Evangeline Lilly) and James "Sawyer" Ford (Josh Holloway) return from bringing a young Ben Linus (Sterling Beaumon) to the island's native population, known as the Others. Kate returns to the infirmary where Juliet Burke (Elizabeth Mitchell) had been treating Ben for a gunshot wound. Ben's father, Roger (Jon Gries), arrives and notices that Ben has gone missing. Kate later approaches Roger, who has been drinking, and says that everything will be okay. He grows suspicious of her and demands to know what happened to Ben. He later tells Jack Shephard (Matthew Fox) of his suspicions, leading Jack to tell Sawyer and Juliet. After dismissing Jack, Sawyer is confronted by Phil (Patrick Fischler), who has seen the security video of Sawyer taking Ben. Sawyer knocks Phil unconscious and tells Juliet to get rope to tie him up.

Miles Straume (Ken Leung), meanwhile, is sent by Horace Goodspeed (Doug Hutchison), the Dharma Initiative's leader on the island, to the construction site of the Swan Station to retrieve a dead body and bring it to Dr. Pierre Chang (François Chau), Miles's father, at the Orchid Station. Before he can bring the body to Dr. Chang, Hugo "Hurley" Reyes tries to take the van containing the body, in order to deliver food to the Orchid Station. Since they are both going to the same place and there are no other vans available, Miles reluctantly agrees to let Hurley accompany him. En route, Hurley finds the body and realizes that Miles can communicate with dead people, an ability Hurley also possesses. After discussing the differences between their abilities, they arrive at the Orchid Station, where Miles transfers the body to Dr. Chang, who, after disposing of it, requires a ride to the construction site. After dropping him off, Miles discovers that Hurley is writing the screenplay for the 1980 film The Empire Strikes Back, from memory, in order to give it to George Lucas. Hurley compares Miles's relationship with his father to the relationship between Luke Skywalker and Darth Vader, as well to the relationship between Hurley and his father. Hurley says that the best thing he ever did was forgive his father for abandoning him and suggests Miles do the same. Miles goes to Dr. Chang's house and observes him interacting with his three-month-old self. However, Dr. Chang is on his way out and takes the older Miles to the dock, where a submarine is arriving with Dharma scientists, among whom is Daniel Faraday (Jeremy Davies). Recognizing Miles, Faraday mentions that it has been a while since they have seen each other.
