= 59th Writers Guild of America Awards =

59th WGA Awards
- Date: February 11, 2007
- Organized by: Writers Guild of America, East and the Writers Guild of America, West

Highlights
- Best Adapted Screenplay: The Departed

The 59th Writers Guild of America Awards honored the best film and television writers of 2006.

== Winners and nominees ==
=== Film ===
==== Best Adapted Screenplay ====
The Departed - William Monahan †

- Borat: Cultural Learnings of America for Make Benefit Glorious Nation of Kazakhstan - Sacha Baron Cohen, Anthony Hines, Peter Baynham and Dan Mazer
- The Devil Wears Prada - Aline Brosh McKenna
- Little Children - Todd Field and Tom Perrotta
- Thank You for Smoking - Jason Reitman

==== Best Original Screenplay ====
Little Miss Sunshine - Michael Arndt †

- Babel - Guillermo Arriaga
- The Queen - Peter Morgan
- Stranger than Fiction - Zach Helm
- United 93 - Paul Greengrass

==== Best Adapted Documentary Feature Screenplay ====
Deliver Us from Evil – Amy J. Berg

- The Heart of the Game – Ward Serrill
- Once in a Lifetime: The Extraordinary Story of the New York Cosmos – Mark Monroe; story by Mark Monroe and John Dower
- Who Killed The Electric Car? – Chris Paine
- Why We Fight – Eugene Jarecki

=== Television ===
==== Dramatic Series ====
The Sopranos - Mitchell Burgess, David Chase, Diane Frolov, Robin Green, Andrew Schneider, Matthew Weiner, Terence Winter

- 24 - Robert Cochran, Manny Coto, Duppy Demetrius, David Ehrman, David Fury, Howard Gordon, Evan Katz, Stephen Kronish, Michael Loceff, Matt Michnovetz, Steve Mitchell, Sam Montgomery, Nicole Ranadive, Joel Surnow, Craig W. Van Sickle
- Deadwood - W. Earl Brown, Regina Corrado, Alix Lambert, Ted Mann, Bernadette McNamara, David Milch, Kem Nunn, Nick Towne, Zack Whedon
- Grey's Anatomy - Debora Cahn, Zoanne A. Clack, Allan Heinberg, Elizabeth Klaviter, Kip Koenig, Stacy McKee, Carolina Paiz, James D. Parriott, Tony Phelan, Joan Rater, Shonda Rhimes, Blythe Robe, Mimi Schmir, Gabrielle Stanton, Krista Vernoff, Harry Werksman, Mark Wilding
- Lost - J. J. Abrams, Monica Owusu-Breen, Carlton Cuse, Leonard Dick, Drew Goddard, Javier Grillo-Marxuach, Adam Horowitz, Dawn Lambertsen Kelly, Christina M. Kim, Edward Kitsis, Damon Lindelof, Steven Maeda, Jeff Pinkner, Matt Ragghianti, Elizabeth Sarnoff, Alison Schapker

==== Episodic Drama ====
"Pilot" - Big Love - Mark V. Olsen and Will Scheffer

- "Election Day Part II" - The West Wing - Eli Attie and John Wells
- "Occupation"/"Precipice" - Battlestar Galactica - Ronald D. Moore
- "Two for the Road" - Lost - Elizabeth Sarnoff and Christina M. Kim
- "The End of the Whole Mess" - Nightmares and Dreamscapes: From the Stories of Stephen King - Stephen King
- "Pilot" - Studio 60 on the Sunset Strip - Aaron Sorkin

==== Comedy Series ====
The Office - Steve Carell, Jennifer Celotta, Greg Daniels, Lee Eisenberg, Brent Forrester, Ricky Gervais, Mindy Kaling, Paul Lieberstein, Stephen Merchant, B. J. Novak, Michael Schur, Gene Stupnitsky

- 30 Rock - Brett Baer, Jack Burditt, Kay Cannon, Robert Carlock, Tina Fey, Dave Finkel, Daisy Gardner, Donald Glover, Matt Hubbard, John Riggi
- Arrested Development - Richard Day, Karey Dornetto, Jake Farrow, Mitchell Hurwitz, Sam Laybourne, Dean Lorey, Tom Saunders, Maria Semple, Chuck Tatham, Jim Vallely, Ron Weiner
- Curb Your Enthusiasm - Larry David
- Entourage - Marc Abrams, Lisa Alden, Michael Benson, Brian Burns, Doug Ellin, Rob Weiss

==== Episodic Comedy ====
"Casino Night" - The Office - Steve Carell

- "It Takes Two" - Desperate Housewives - Kevin Murphy & Jenna Bans
- "Don't Look at Me" - Desperate Housewives - Josh Senter
- "Bomb Shelter" - Malcolm in the Middle - Rob Ulin
- "The Coup" - The Office - Paul Lieberstein
- "Jump for Joy" - My Name Is Earl - Vali Chandrasekaran

==== New Series ====
Ugly Betty - Veronica Becker, Oliver Goldstick, Silvio Horta, Sarah Kucserka, Sheila Lawrence, Cameron Litvack, Myra Jo Martino, Jim D. Parriott, Marco Pennette, Dailyn Rodriguez, Don Todd

- 30 Rock - Brett Baer, Jack Burditt, Kay Cannon, Robert Carlock, Tina Fey, Dave Finkel, Daisy Gardner, Donald Glover, Matt Hubbard, John Riggi
- Friday Night Lights - Peter Berg, Bridget Carpenter, Kerry Ehrin, Carter Harris, Elizabeth Heldens, David Hudgins, Jason Katims, Patrick Massett, Andy Miller, Aaron Rahsaan Thomas, John Zinman
- Heroes - Jesse Alexander, Adam Armus, Natalie Chaidez, Aron Eli Coleite, Kay Foster, Bryan Fuller, Michael J. Green, Chuck Kim, Tim Kring, Jeph Loeb, Joe Pokaski
- Studio 60 on the Sunset Strip - Eli Attie, Christina Kiang Booth, Jessica Brickman, Dana Calvo, Mark Goffman, David Handelman, Cinque Henderson, Mark McKinney, Melissa Myers, Aaron Sorkin, Amy Turner

==== Long Form - Original ====
Flight 93 - Nevin Schreiner

==== Daytime Serials ====
As the World Turns
