= Left Behind (Lost) =

- Lost episode
- Episode no.: Season 3 Episode 15
- Directed by: Karen Gaviola
- Written by: Damon Lindelof; Elizabeth Sarnoff
- Production code: 315
- Original air date: April 4, 2007
- Running time: 42 minutes

Guest appearances
- Kim Dickens as Cassidy Phillips; Beth Broderick as Diane Janssen; Fredric Lane as Marshal Edward Mars; Shawn Lathrop as Agent; Andrew Meader as Johnny; Bill Ogilvie as Man

Episode chronology
← Previous "Exposé"	Next → "One of Us"
- Lost season 3

"Left Behind" is the 15th episode of the 3rd season of Lost. It was aired on April 4, 2007, making it the 64th episode of the series. The episode was written by Damon Lindelof and Elizabeth Sarnoff and directed by Karen Gaviola. The character of Kate is featured in the episode's flashbacks.

== Plot ==
=== Flashbacks ===
In a flashback to Iowa, Kate's car breaks down and is towed into a service station. She overhears a man and a woman arguing. The woman is Cassidy, whom Sawyer trained to be a grifter and all of whose money he stole in the flashbacks of a previous episode. She is working the jewelry con on the man. He thinks the necklaces are fake and wants to call the police, but Kate tells him that her father was a jeweler and that the jewelry is not fake, dissuading the man from calling. Cassidy asks Kate why she didn't want the police to be called; later, over drinks at a bar, Kate explains that her stepfather was a bad man, so she killed him, escaped from the US marshal who arrested her, and now is back in Iowa to talk to her mother. Cassidy offers to help. She says she was conned and embarrassed by a "bad guy" as well (referring to Sawyer) and that one of them deserves something good.

Back in Iowa, Kate knocks on her mother's door. Diane opens the door, but before she can say anything, cops surround Kate and cuff her. Marshal Mars walks out only to realize that it is not Kate; it is Cassidy dressed as Kate, who claims to be just selling Bibles. Watching through binoculars from down the street is the real Kate, and she realizes just what she is up against - the police are paying very close watch to her mom so she will have a hard time securing contact with her. Later at the motel, Kate reveals that her mother gave her up to the police, despite Kate taking out an insurance policy on the home before buying it to set her mother up for life. Kate wants to know why her mom betrayed her and chose her abusive husband over her.

Cassidy goes to the restaurant where Kate's mom works and 'accidentally' dumps a bowl of chili on her. Diane goes to the bathroom to clean up; Kate is waiting there for her. Diane tells Kate that she killed the man she loved, and she asserts that she didn't choose that she loved him. Kate replies that Wayne abused her, but Diane simply snaps back that she didn't kill Wayne for anyone but herself. Diane promises not to contact the police, but says she will if she sees Kate again. Kate begins to tear up, emotional.

In a flashback to Iowa, Cassidy drops Kate off at the service station. Cassidy tells her she is pregnant, by the same man who conned her (Sawyer). She wants him dead, yet she still loves him. Kate says to call the cops and have him locked up. Cassidy asks if Kate would forgive her mom for calling the cops. Kate says no, but that this guy has it coming.

=== At the Barracks/In the jungle ===
Kate is held captive by The Others and still handcuffed. When Juliet comes to bring her food, Kate attempts to attack her, but Juliet quickly overpowers her. Soon after, Locke comes in to say that he is abandoning her and leaving with the Others. Locke tells her he does not want to go home; he explains that he made a strong case for her but then they told him who she was and what she had done, he knew that they would likely not forgive her.

Back at the barracks, Kate hears noises outside, looks through the screen and sees the Others packing to leave. They all put on gas masks, then the door to the recreation center flies open, someone tosses in a canister and slams the door shut. The canister pops open and gas starts fuming out, knocking her out cold. She wakes up in the jungle, handcuffed to Juliet. Kate takes Juliet's knife and tries unsuccessfully to unlock the handcuffs. Kate says they are going back for her friends.

As Kate follows a trail leading to the barracks, they end up getting into a fight about Jack, and Kate dislocates Juliet's shoulder. Juliet's yell of pain attracts the smoke monster, and they quickly run into the roots of a banyan tree for cover. The Monster roils up in front of them, and Juliet's face is lit up by a series of bright flashes of light. The monster then retreats, leaving Juliet terrified. She claims to have never seen the monster before.

Juliet reveals that Jack told Kate not to come back for him, not because he does not want Kate to be harmed, but because she broke his heart. Then, as Kate calms Juliet down, Juliet asks Kate to put her shoulder back in place, and after doing so, they fall asleep.

Kate and Juliet continue to the barracks; however, the monster returns. They take off running, and come upon the pylons. Kate jerks Juliet to a stop and says they cannot go through them. Juliet reaches into her back pocket, takes out a key, and unlocks the cuffs. She then runs to a pylon, enters an access code on a key pad, and they run across the barrier. Juliet jams the setting into the red zone, enabling the previously disabled pylons to send a powerful sonic wave to anything that tries to pass between them. The monster zooms in and bounces off the barrier. It roils and rises, making awful noises, and is unable to pass through the fence. Then it quickly flies away.

Kate asks about the key. Juliet says she was left behind, too, and by people she knew and trusted. She hoped that if Kate thought they were in it together, Kate would not leave her behind in the jungle like they did. Kate unlocks her cuff, and they continue on and reach the barracks. Everyone appears to be gone. Juliet goes to look for Sayid, and Kate goes to get Jack, finding him unconscious on the floor of his house. Kate wakes him up and tells him the Others left because of her. She apologizes and cries for messing up his plans to go home, he ignores her and asks where Juliet is. Kate pulls back emotionally, telling him that they left her, too. They join Juliet and Sayid. Jack suggests taking what they can find and starting back before dark. Sayid objects to Juliet coming with them, but Jack is insistent. Kate and Sayid trade looks, both worried about this new development, and head out.

=== At the beach ===
Back at the beach, Hurley tells Sawyer that after the Nikki and Paulo situation with the diamonds, the camp is going to vote on whether or not to "banish" him. Hurley says there are benefits to living as part of a society and suggests he make amends to fix things.

Sawyer tells Hurley he is ready to make amends. He apologizes to Hurley for calling him all those names, is nice to Claire and gives her a blanket for the baby and tells her that Aaron looks less wrinkled since the last time Sawyer saw him, and partners with Desmond to hunt for boar and provide food for the camp. Later, Sawyer roasts the boar and everyone eats. Charlie tells Sawyer he had not heard about any vote, and Sawyer realizes he was conned by Hurley into being nice. Hurley explains that with Jack, Locke, Kate and Sayid gone, Sawyer is all they have, and is the de facto leader. Sawyer dislikes this idea, but Hurley insists that while Jack didn't like it either, it didn't change the fact that all eyes were on him. Sawyer sees how happy he made people and attempts to keep the good vibes going, even offering to hold Aaron for Claire.

== Cast notes ==
Kiele Sanchez (Nikki Fernandez) and Rodrigo Santoro (Paulo) are no longer credited with the starring cast.
