= Eggtown =

- Lost episode
- Ben reads VALIS and eats eggs
- Episode no.: Season 4 Episode 4
- Directed by: Stephen Williams
- Written by: Elizabeth Sarnoff; Greggory Nations
- Production code: 404
- Original air date: February 21, 2008
- Running time: 43 minutes

Guest appearances
- Shawn Doyle as Duncan Forrester; Susan Gibney as Melissa Dunbrook; Beth Broderick as Diane Janssen; Zoë Bell as Regina; Traber Burns as Judge Arthur Galzethon; Fred Q. Collins as Pearson; Tania Kahale as Veronica; William Blanchette as Aaron

Episode chronology
| ← Previous "The Economist" | Next → "The Constant" |
- Lost season 4

"Eggtown" is the fourth episode of the fourth season and 76th episode overall of the ABC's serial drama television series Lost. It was aired on February 21, 2008, on ABC in the United States and on CTV in Canada. It was written by supervising producer Elizabeth Sarnoff and script coordinator Greggory Nations and directed by co-executive producer Stephen Williams. This is the first episode written by Nations.

The episode's island plot takes place in late December 2004, 90-plus days after the crash of Oceanic Airlines Flight 815. Flashforwards show Kate Austen (played by Evangeline Lilly) on trial for her numerous pre-island crimes, after her escape from the island. "Eggtown" was watched by 15 million people and received mixed reviews from critics. The cliffhanger was generally praised, but the slow pace was criticized.

== Plot ==
John Locke (Terry O'Quinn) is keeping Ben Linus (Michael Emerson) prisoner in the basement of the house that he has claimed in the Barracks. He prepares breakfast for him, including the two remaining eggs which he fries along with some fresh melon, but Ben taunts him and Locke becomes frustrated. Kate cuts a deal with Locke's prisoner Miles Straume (Ken Leung): he will tell her what he knows about her if he can speak to Ben for a minute. Miles wants to extort $3.2 million from Ben and in return, Miles promises to lie to his employer claiming Ben is dead. Miles gives Ben a week to produce the cash. Before Locke finds them, Miles reveals that he knows all about Kate's past. Locke banishes Kate from the Barracks and goes to a lake house where Miles is being held captive. Locke puts a grenade in Miles's mouth so that if he ceases to bite, he will die. Kate sleeps with James "Sawyer" Ford (Josh Holloway) but does not have sex with him. Before Kate leaves for the camp at the beach, she slaps Sawyer across the face after he suggests that she is just pretending to be mad as an excuse to go back to Jack Shephard (Matthew Fox) and continue their love triangle.

Meanwhile, Jack returns to the survivors' beach camp with Juliet Burke (Elizabeth Mitchell) and newcomers Daniel Faraday (Jeremy Davies) and Charlotte Lewis (Rebecca Mader). Jack and Juliet grow increasingly uneasy over a series of unsuccessful attempts to contact the freighter by satellite phone and verify that Desmond Hume (Henry Ian Cusick), Sayid Jarrah (Naveen Andrews) and Frank Lapidus (Jeff Fahey), who departed for the freighter by helicopter the previous evening, have arrived safely. That evening, as Charlotte tests Daniel's memory using playing cards (Daniel successfully remembers two out of three cards, and Charlotte remarks that this is "progress"), Jack and Juliet ask if there is another phone number they could try. Charlotte dials an emergency number and speaks to Regina (Zoë Bell), who reports that the helicopter never arrived.

After leaving the island, Kate is famous as one of the Oceanic Six. She is tried for her numerous crimes committed before the crash and pleads not guilty. Because Kate is opposed to bringing her son into the trial, Jack is called in as a character witness. He lies in his testimony, saying that Flight 815 crashed in the water, eight survived the crash, but two have since died and Kate was primarily responsible for the Oceanic Six's survival. Kate speaks with her mother Diane Janssen (Beth Broderick) for the first time in four years. Diane is no longer angry at Kate because her perspective changed when she thought that Kate had died in the plane crash. When Diane, the prosecution's star witness, no longer wants to testify against her daughter, the District Attorney makes a plea deal: Kate gets ten years probation, but must stay in the state of California. Jack meets Kate in the parking garage. He admits that he still loves her (in contrast to his false testimony under oath on her behalf) and asks to go out for coffee with her. Kate responds that they cannot go out until he is willing to visit her baby. It is then revealed that Kate is raising Claire Littleton's (Emilie de Ravin) son Aaron (William Blanchette) as her own.

== Production ==
Greggory "Gregg" Nations worked as the script coordinator for the late 1990s CBS television series Nash Bridges. Lost's show runners Damon Lindelof and Carlton Cuse—the former was a writer and the latter was the show runner for Nash Bridges—hired Nations to serve as Lost's script coordinator in the 2005 alongside pre-production of the second season. Nations rewatched every episode and created a series "Bible" and timeline. Nations made his direct Lost writing debut with "Eggtown". Nations would be promoted to a coproducer for the show's fifth season.

Lindelof and Cuse hyped in September 2007 that "Eggtown" would conclude Kate's potential pregnancy. After having sex a few times in the third season, Kate and Sawyer begin to wonder if Kate is pregnant. In "Eggtown", Kate exclaims to Sawyer that she is not pregnant and Sawyer rejoices, causing Kate to become angry with him and leave the Barracks. Evangeline Lilly was excited by Kate's new connection to Aaron. Lilly has said that if she could choose to play another Lost character, it would be Claire because of Aaron. Now she gets to have Aaron while portraying Kate. She also enjoyed Kate having more responsibility because it puts her in a different situation from previous seasons.

The word "Eggtown" is not directly referenced in the episode, resulting in online speculation and confusion. According to Lindelof and Cuse, it has been "the most questioned title of the show". Jeff Jensen of Entertainment Weekly suggested that the title was a reference to the ancient cosmic egg concept or the chicken or the egg causality dilemma, while John Kubicek of BuddyTV guessed that it was a shout-out to the children's book and film called The Easter Egg Adventure, which depicts roosters attempting to steal Easter eggs from the animals of a place called Egg Town or that it was an allusion to the Great Depression slang term, which was used in the 1930s when describing a bad deal. Lindelof and Cuse confirmed that the episode was primarily named as such because Locke fries eggs for Ben's breakfast and secondarily because the story deals with Kate's possible pregnancy.

"Eggtown" continues Lost's pattern of featuring numerous literary references, which may allude to a favourite book of the writers or a story similar to that of a character. Locke gives Ben Philip K. Dick's VALIS, a 1981 science fiction novel about a gnostic vision of one aspect of God. Sawyer reads The Invention of Morel, a 1940 science fiction novel by Argentine writer Adolfo Bioy Casares about a fugitive who hides on a deserted Pacific island where the people are only images and do not exist.

Hurley also asks James if he would like to watch Xanadu or a fictional film called Satan's Doom but James replies saying that he is reading a book. Hurley then plays Xanadu and we hear the film's title song.

== Reception ==
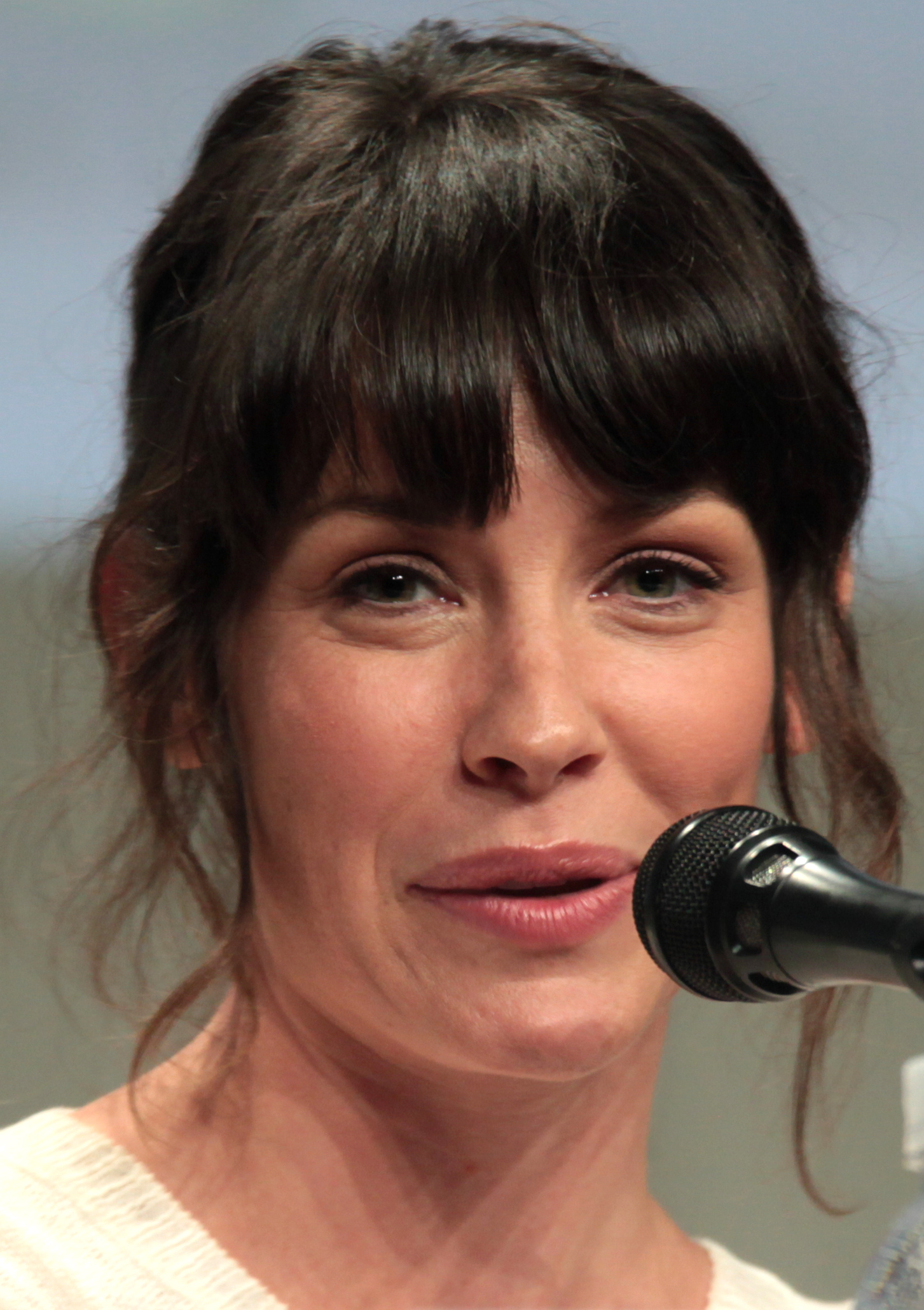
Evangeline Lilly's lead performance was praised by Robert Bianco of USA Today, but criticized by Diane Werts of Newsday.

"Eggtown" was watched by 13.647 million American viewers, ranking Lost seventh of the week in Nielsen ratings. The episode was watched by a total of 15.438 million viewers, including those who watched within seven days of broadcast, making it the most recorded show of the week; this number went toward the year-end season average. It received at least 5.7/13 in the key adults 18–49 demographic. The Canadian broadcast was seen by 1.615 million people, making it the ninth most watched show of the week. In the United Kingdom, Lost brought in 1.1 million viewers. Amidst speculation that Lost would be pulled from the schedule, 780,000 Australians tuned in to "Eggtown" and made it the nineteenth most watched show of the night. Nevertheless, it was in the top ten programs of the night in each of the key adults 25–54, 18–49 and 16–39 demographics.

Robert Bianco of USA Today praised Lilly's performance, saying that it was almost worthy of a Primetime Emmy Award nomination. TV Guide's Michael Ausiello dubbed "Eggtown" the best episode of the first four episodes of the fourth season. Nikki Stafford of Wizard described it as a "great episode" and observed that it features "the first conversation between Jin and Sun [of the] season. Interesting that last season so many fans were up in arms for the [early third season] because we didn't get to see enough of the other characters, and this season we're seeing even less of the others, yet no one is complaining. Looks like the writers finally found the right balance." Entertainment Weekly's Jeff Jensen thought that the episode "was all about moving all the simmering subplots forward so the next episodes can drive them home". Kristin Dos Santos of E! called the episode's final plot twist "fantastic" and "unexpected". Digital Spy's Ben Rawson-Jones called it the best of the first four episodes of the season with four out of five stars, saying that "the courtroom scenes were very well executed, with a marked difference in the characterisation of Jack [who] has become known as the trustworthy, honest type since Oceanic Flight 815 crashed, so his blatant lies about the island under oath were definitely dramatic." Erin Martell of AOL's TV Squad reviewed "Eggtown" positively, writing that it "not many shows could mix topics like blackmail, grenades, and motherhood into one episode, but Lost pulled it off." Jon Lachonis of UGO claimed that Lost "again blew everybody's minds" with "Eggtown". BuddyTV's Oscar Dahl commented that "those last few [flash]forward scenes were genius. The writers really out-did themselves." Jay Glatfelter of The Huffington Post thought that "Eggtown" "effectively kept up the frantic pace that this season has set, answering some really good questions while effectively bringing up new ones."

Patrick Day of the Los Angeles Times found "Eggtown" to be set at a slower pace than other episodes of the season and said that "the witness stand as forum for revelation … holds no appeal for me." Newsday's Diane Werts had mixed feelings about "Eggtown". She criticized the lack of plot twists, stating that "that last-second 'reveal' of [Kate raising Aaron] turned out to be a bit of a dud". Werts also critiqued the execution and acting, calling the trial "blandly delivered" and Lilly and Fox "expressionless". Alan Sepinwall of The Star-Ledger dubbed "Eggtown" "the weakest episode of the season", partially because he also was unimpressed with the lack of plot twists and does not find Kate to be a compelling character. The San Diego Union-Tribune's Karla Peterson gave a mixed review, writing that "last night's Lost was not amazing, until it slammed us upside the head with a plot curveball that left us unable to remember whatever doubts we may have had, say, one minute before." Daniel of TMZ gave the episode a "D", partially because the twist ending had been spoiled for him. IGN's Chris Carabott rated it the worst of the first four by scoring it as a 7.6/10. He wrote that the flashforward was "out of place" and that the "final revelation was shocking … but Lost can't survive on shock value alone." Daniel MacEachern of Television Without Pity gave the episode a "B", the lowest grade for a fourth season episode from the website.
