= The Whole Truth (Lost) =

- Lost episode
- Episode no.: Season 2 Episode 16
- Directed by: Karen Gaviola
- Written by: Elizabeth Sarnoff; Christina M. Kim
- Production code: 216
- Original air date: March 22, 2006
- Running time: 43 minutes

Guest appearances
- L. Scott Caldwell as Rose Nadler; Sam Anderson as Bernard Nadler; Tony Lee as Jae Lee; Michael Emerson as Henry Gale; Greg Joung Paik as Dr. Je-Gyu Kim

Episode chronology
← Previous "Maternity Leave"	Next → "Lockdown"
- Lost season 2

"The Whole Truth" is the 41st episode of Lost. It is the 16th episode of the second season. The episode was directed by Karen Gaviola, and written by Elizabeth Sarnoff and Christina M. Kim. It first aired on March 22, 2006, on ABC. The character of Sun Kwon (Yunjin Kim) is featured in the episode's flashbacks, which revolve around her and Jin Kwon's (Daniel Dae Kim) fertility problems.

== Plot ==
=== Flashbacks ===
In their apartment, Sun and Jin are about to have sex, when Jin asks Sun if she took her temperature, ruining the mood. As they have been trying for a year to conceive, he thinks she should see a fertility doctor. Sun asks why he wants a baby he will never see. Jin says he is sorry for the things Sun's father makes him do and that a baby would change everything. The doctor, however, advises them that Sun cannot conceive due to advanced endometriosis.

Sun enters a hotel room to meet Jae Lee, her suitor from before meeting Jin. Sun is regularly meeting Jae to learn English and seek advice on her relationship. She tells Jae that she was glad to learn about her infertility. Sun is learning English to leave Jin for America. Having feelings for her, Jae tries to convince her to stay.

Sun is walking her dog when the doctor drives by and confesses that it is actually Jin who cannot have children. He previously lied, fearing that Jin would burn down his practice if he found out the truth.

=== On the island ===
An angry Jin tries to take Sun away from her garden and back to the beach, given her previous abduction from the garden. They have an argument and Jin pulls out all of the plants. She runs to the beach and, in pain, meets Bernard and Rose, who are having an argument of their own. She later asks Sawyer for a pregnancy test, which turns out to be manufactured by Widmore Labs.

Locke convinces Ana Lucia that given her police training and encounters with the Others, she should interrogate Henry Gale. He repeats the balloon story and draws a map to the balloon, where he had buried his wife. Ana Lucia promises to keep him alive if the map confirms his story. Together with Sayid and Charlie, she goes in search for the balloon. Ana Lucia realizes that Charlie carries a concealed gun, and asks him to give it to someone who knows how to use it. Charlie reluctantly gives the gun to Sayid.

While waiting for her pregnancy test results to show up, Sun asks if Kate has ever taken a test; Kate replies that she has. When the test turns up positive, Sun does not seem thrilled. She asks if it is accurate and they go to Jack to find out. He says those tests are very accurate. Sun asks Jack to not tell anybody.

Ana Lucia joins Sayid by a campfire and apologizes for what she did. Sayid says it was not her fault, and explains that he holds the Others responsible for Shannon's death; he comments that once they find out if Henry is one of them, something will have to be done.

The next morning, Sawyer tells Bernard that Sun is pregnant in front of Jin. However, Jin cannot understand them.

Jin replants the plants he pulled out. He apologizes and Sun admits that she is pregnant. He is overjoyed, but Sun reveals he is the one who cannot have children, not her. He asks Sun how she can be pregnant and she promises she did not cheat. He then helps Sun rebuild her garden. Sun asks if she can stay and work in her garden as Jin wants to return to the beach. Jin bends down and kisses Sun. He tells her he loves her in English.

Jack takes Henry out of his "prison." Henry eats some cereal. He says he figures it is his reward for drawing the map. Locke and Jack are caught off guard since they did not know about the map. Henry then mentions that if he were one of the Others, he would have probably led Ana Lucia, Sayid, and Charlie to a trap, where the Others would take them hostage and trade them for him.

== Production ==
Michael Emerson, who portrays Henry Gale, was originally contracted to appear in just three episodes of Lost, making his first appearance in "One of Them". The producers were so impressed by him that they contracted him for a further five episodes, citing the scene at the end of this episode where Henry asks for milk as the moment they knew he was a "keeper". He was then made a part of the regular cast from the third season.

== Reception ==
15.30 million American viewers viewed this episode.
