= Elizabeth Sarnoff =

American television writer and producer

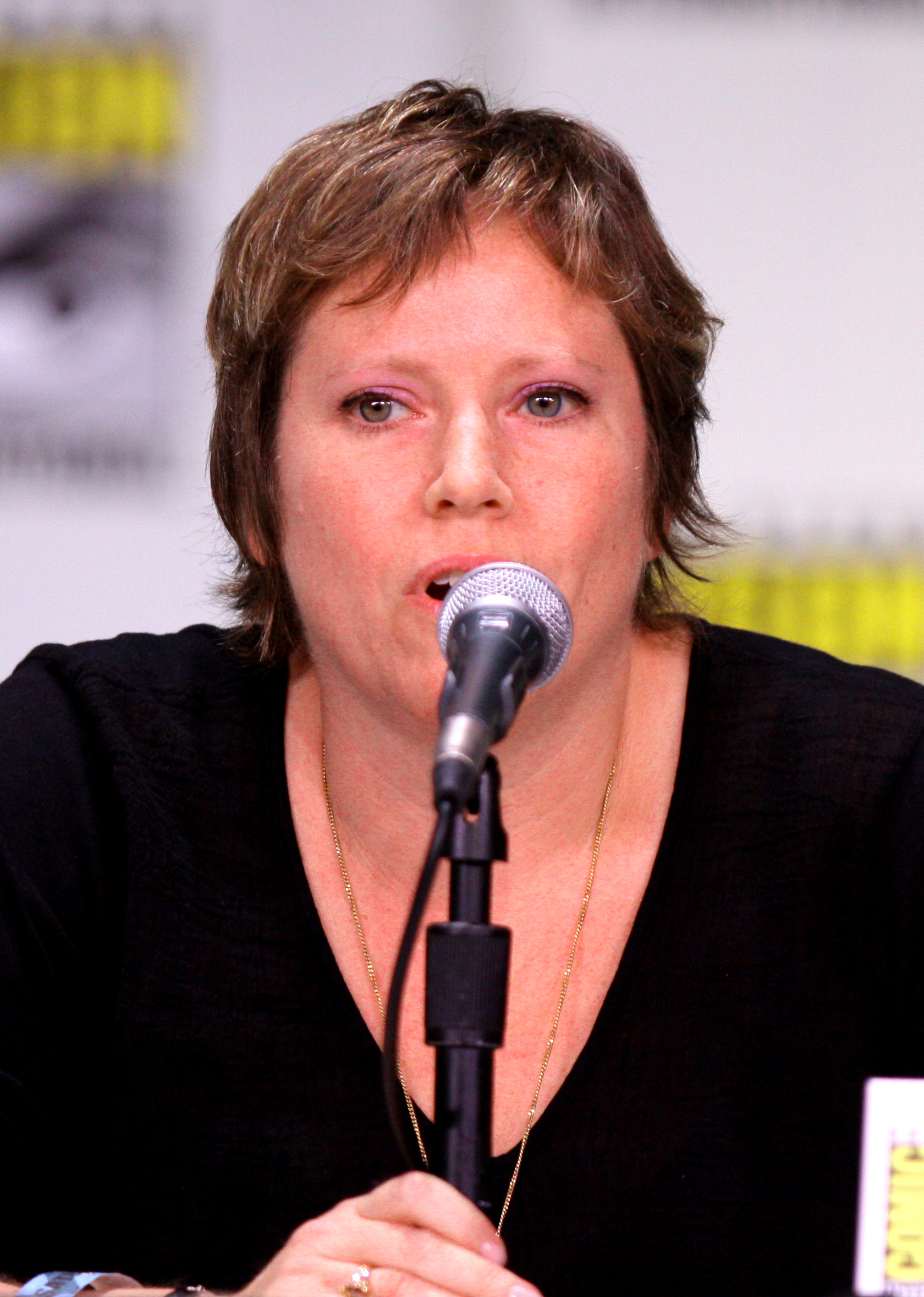
- Sarnoff at the 2011 San Diego Comic-Con
- Occupations: Screenwriter, producer
- Writing career
- Notable works: Deadwood, Lost, Alcatraz

Elizabeth Sarnoff is an American television writer and producer.

She has written episodes of NYPD Blue, Crossing Jordan, Deadwood, Lost and Barry. She was the co-creator of the Fox crime/mystery series Alcatraz.

== Career ==
Sarnoff joined the crew of Deadwood as an executive story editor and writer for the first season in 2004. Sarnoff wrote the episodes "Here Was a Man" and "Suffer the Little Children". She was promoted to producer for the second season in 2005. She wrote the episodes "New Money" and "Amalgamation and Capital". Sarnoff and the writing staff were nominated for the Writers Guild of America (WGA) Award for Best Dramatic Series at the February 2006 ceremony for their work on the second season.

She joined the crew of Lost as a producer and writer for the series second season in fall 2005. Sarnoff and the Lost writing staff won the WGA Award for Best Dramatic Series at the February 2006 ceremony for their work on the first and second seasons. She was promoted to supervising producer for the third season in 2006. Sarnoff and her co-writer Christina M. Kim were nominated for the WGA award for Best Episodic Drama at the February 2007 ceremony for their work on the second season episode "Two for the Road". The writing staff were again nominated for the WGA Award for Best Dramatic Series at the February 2007 ceremony for their work on the second and third seasons. She remained a supervising producer and regular writer for the series fourth season in 2008. She was nominated for the WGA Award for Best Dramatic Series at the February 2009 ceremony for her work on the fourth season of Lost. She was promoted to co-executive producer for the fifth season in 2009. The writing staff was nominated for the award again at the February 2010 ceremony for their work on the fifth season. She was promoted to executive producer for the series sixth and final season in 2010.

In 2011, Sarnoff, along with Steven Lilien and Bryan Wynbrandt, co-created the FOX series Alcatraz. She has since worked on series such as Crossbones, Marco Polo and Barry.

== Trivia ==
Her name was used for a character in Fringe episode "The Cure". Like Lost, Fringe was co-created by J. J. Abrams and produced by Bad Robot.

She graduated from New York University Tisch School of the Arts in 1991, with a BFA degree in drama.

She's openly gay.

== Deadwood episodes ==
- "Here Was a Man" (Season 1, Episode 4)
- "Suffer the Little Children" (Season 1, Episode 8)
- "New Money" (Season 2, Episode 3)
- "Amalgamation and Capital" (Season 2, Episode 8)

== Lost episodes ==
- "Abandoned" (Season 2, Episode 6)
- "The Hunting Party" (Season 2, Episode 11) with Christina M. Kim
- "The Whole Truth" (Season 2, Episode 16) with Christina M. Kim
- "Two for the Road" (Season 2, Episode 20) with Christina M. Kim
- "Further Instructions" (Season 3, Episode 3) with Carlton Cuse
- "Stranger in a Strange Land" (Season 3, Episode 9) with Christina M. Kim
- "Left Behind" (Season 3, Episode 15) with Damon Lindelof
- "The Man Behind the Curtain" (Season 3, Episode 20) with Drew Goddard
- "Eggtown" (Season 4, Episode 4) with Greggory Nations
- "Meet Kevin Johnson" (Season 4, Episode 8) with Brian K. Vaughan
- "Cabin Fever" (Season 4, Episode 11) with Kyle Pennington
- "Jughead" (Season 5, Episode 3) with Paul Zbyszewski
- "LaFleur" (Season 5, Episode 8) with Kyle Pennington
- "Dead is Dead" (Season 5, Episode 12) with Brian K. Vaughan
- "Follow the Leader" (Season 5, Episode 15) with Paul Zbyszewski
- "The Substitute" (Season 6, Episode 4) with Melinda Hsu Taylor
- "Recon" (Season 6, Episode 8) with Jim Galasso
- "The Candidate" (Season 6, Episode 14) with Jim Galasso
- "What They Died For" (Season 6, Episode 16) with Adam Horowitz and Edward Kitsis

== Alcatraz episodes ==
- "Pilot" 01.01 (with Steven Lilien and Bryan Wynbrandt)

== Salem episodes ==
- "In Lies" 01.03
- "Vain" 01.05
- "Children, Be Afraid" 01.09

== Crossbones episodes ==
- "Antoinette" 01.04

== Marco Polo episodes ==
- "Measure Against the Linchpin" 01.03
- "Whitehorse" 01.08
- "The Fellowship" 01.10

== Barry episodes ==
- "Chapter Seven: Loud, Fast, and Keep Going" 01.07
- "The Audition" 02.07
- "candy asses" 03.07
- "a nice meal" 04.07
