= Christina M. Kim =

American television writer

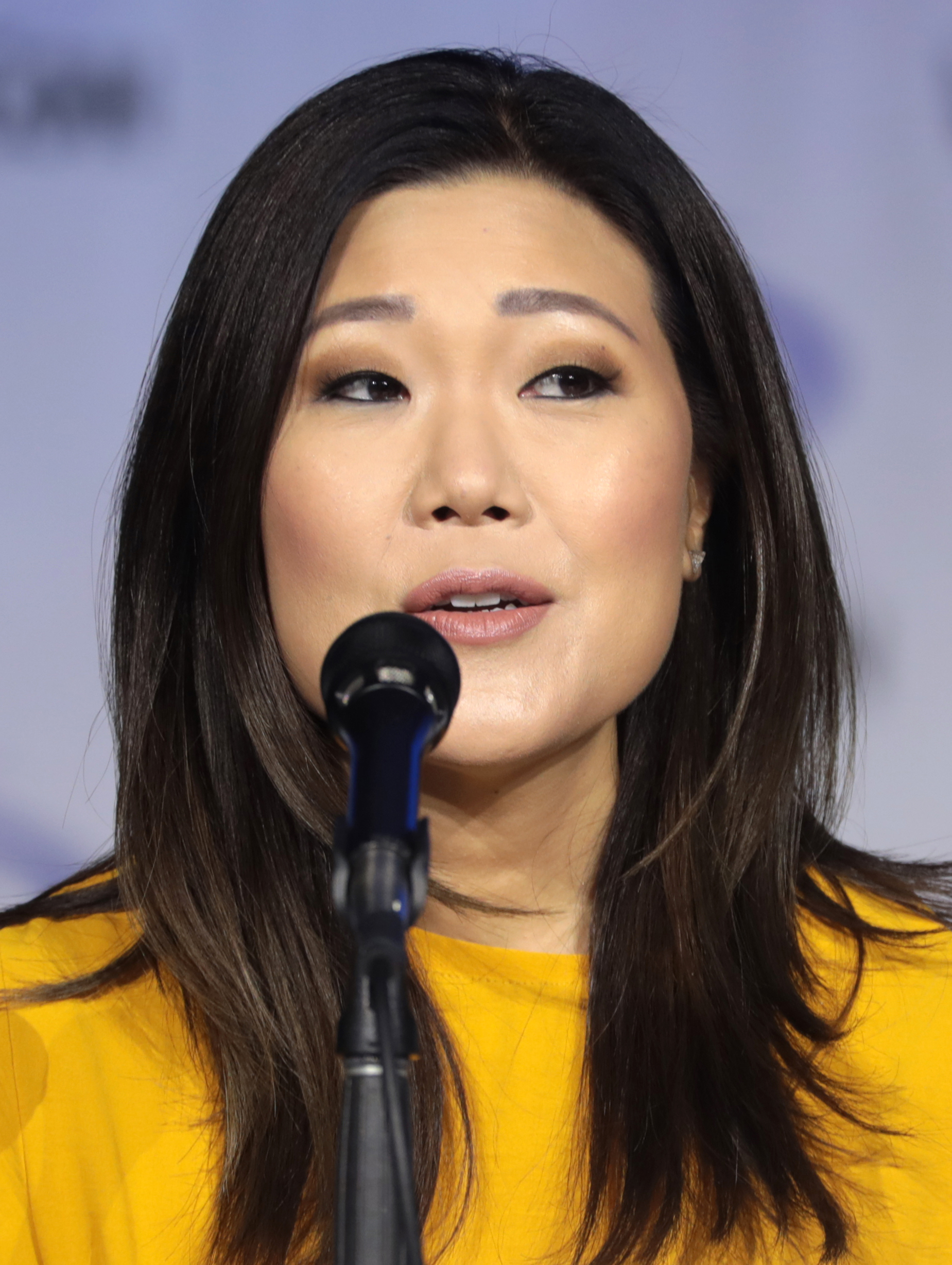
- Kim at the 2022 WonderCon
- Native name: 김수진
- Occupation: Screenwriter

Christina M. Kim (Korean: 김수진) is an American television writer. In the 2005-06 television season, she joined the writing staff of Lost for the series' second season. The staff won the Writers Guild of America (WGA) Award for Best Dramatic Series at the February 2006 ceremony for their work on the second season.

She became a story editor and co-writer for the third season in 2006. Kim and co-writer Elizabeth Sarnoff were nominated for the WGA award for Best Episodic Drama at the February 2007 ceremony for their work on the second season episode "Two for the Road". The writing staff were again nominated for the WGA Award for Best Dramatic Series at the February 2007 ceremony for their work on the second and third seasons.

She was promoted to executive story editor for the fourth season. She was again nominated for the WGA Award for Best Dramatic Series at the February 2009 ceremony for her work on the fourth season.

From 2010-12, Kim produced and wrote episodes for the CBS procedural hit NCIS Los Angeles.

In 2019, Kim's script for The CW's modern reboot of Kung Fu was ordered to pilot and picked up to series in 2020 despite production being temporarily shut down by COVID-19 pandemic. On May 3, 2021, Kung Fu was renewed by The CW for a highly anticipated second season.

== Episodes written ==
=== Hawaii: Five-0 ===
- 4.04 - A ia la aku 2013
- 4.18 - Ho i Hou 2014

=== NCIS Los Angeles ===
- 3.22 - Neighborhood Watch 2012
- 3.06 - Lone Wolf 2011
- 2.20 - The Job 2011
- 2.14 - Lockup 2011
- 2.07 - Anonymous 2010

=== Lost ===
- 2.11 - "The Hunting Party" – January 18, 2006 (with Elizabeth Sarnoff)
- 2.16 - "The Whole Truth" – March 22, 2006 (with Elizabeth Sarnoff)
- 2.20 - "Two for the Road" – May 3, 2006 (with Elizabeth Sarnoff)
- 3.09 - "Stranger in a Strange Land" – February 21, 2007 (with Elizabeth Sarnoff)
- 3.12 - "Par Avion" – March 14, 2007 (with Jordan Rosenberg)
- 4.06 - "The Other Woman" – March 6, 2008 (with Drew Goddard)
