= Kim Edwards =

American author and educator

- Born: May 4, 1958 (age 68); Killeen, Texas, U.S.
- Education: Colgate University; Iowa Writers' Workshop
- Occupation: Author
- Writing career
- Notable work: The Memory Keeper's Daughter
- Website: kimedwardsbooks.com

Kim Edwards (born May 4, 1958) is an American author and educator. She is the author of a story collection, The Secrets of a Fire King, and her first novel, The Memory Keeper's Daughter, won several awards and became a bestseller.

== Early life and education ==
Kim Edwards was born on May 4, 1958 in Killeen, Texas. When she was two months old, her family moved to upstate New York, where she was raised.

Edwards began college at Cayuga Community College. She transferred to Colgate University in 1979, and graduated with a bachelor's degree in 1981. In 1983, Edwards received a master's degree from the university of Iowa Writers' Workshop. Edwards earned a second Master of Arts degree in linguistics, also from the University of Iowa, in 1987.

== Career ==
Edwards wrote the short story collection, The Secrets of a Fire King (1997), which was an alternate for the 1998 PEN/Hemingway Award, and has won both a Whiting Award and the Nelson Algren Award.

Edwards' 2005 novel, The Memory Keeper's Daughter, was named the 2006 Book of the Year by USA Today. Her most recent novel, The Lake of Dreams, New York Times Best Seller, was published in January 2011.

Her second novel, The Lake of Dreams, an Independent Booksellers pick, was also an international best seller.

As of 2010, Edwards was teaching writing at the University of Kentucky.

== Recognition and awards ==
The Secrets of a Fire King, which was a finalist for the PEN/Hemingway Award; her stories have been published in The Paris Review, Story, Ploughshares, Zoetrope, and many other periodicals. She has received many awards for the short story as well, including a Pushcart Prize, the National Magazine Award, the Nelson Algren Award, and inclusion in both The Best American Short Stories and the Symphony Space program 'Selected Shorts'.

She is the recipient of a Whiting Writers' Award, as well as grants from the Pennsylvania and Kentucky Arts Councils, the Kentucky Foundation for Women, and the National Endowment for the Arts.

The Memory Keeper's Daughter, her first novel, was a Barnes and Noble Discover Award pick and became a word-of-mouth best-seller, spending 122 consecutive weeks on the New York Times Best Seller list, 20 of those weeks at #1. The Memory Keeper's Daughter won the Kentucky Literary Award and the British Book Award, and was chosen as Book of the Year for 2006 by USA Today.

== Personal life ==
Edwards married Thomas Clayton in 1987, and they have two daughters together.

== Works ==
=== Books ===
- The Secrets of a Fire King. WW Norton. 1997. ISBN 978-0-39304-026-5.
  - "The Great Chain of Being," Originally Published in The Paris Review, Issue 120, Fall 1991
- The Memory Keeper's Daughter. Viking Adult. 2005. ISBN 978-0-67003-416-1. "9780670034161."
- The Lake of Dreams. Viking. 2011. ISBN 978-0-67002-217-5.

=== Short stories ===
- "Paradise". Ploughshares. Emerson College. Fall 1990.
- "Aristotle's Lantern". Zoetrope: All-Story. 6 (1). Spring 2002. Archived from the original on September 8, 2015.
- "In the Garden". Ploughshares. Emerson College. Fall 2003.
