= Bible (screenwriting) =

Screenwriter's reference document used for information on a series

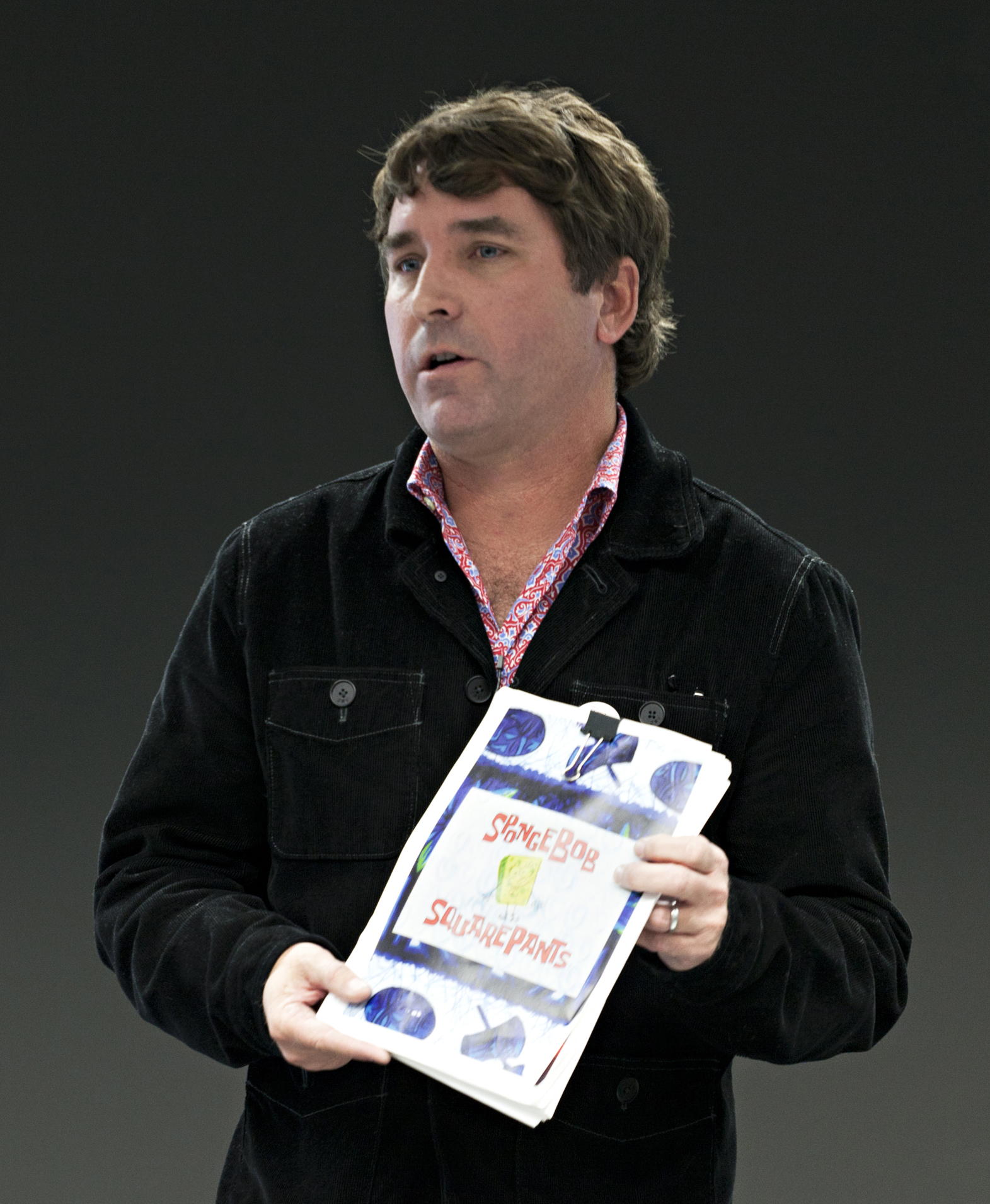
Cartoonist Stephen Hillenburg holding the bible of the animated series SpongeBob SquarePants

A bible, also known as a show bible or pitch bible, is a reference document used by screenwriters for information on characters, settings, and other elements of a television, film or video game project. The document describes and outlines core concepts of the project in an attempt to provide consistency on key details, character development, and an accurate continuity or timeline, and may also be used as part of a sales pitch when planning a new project.

== Types ==
Bibles are updated with information on the characters after the information has been established on screen, scripts, or writer's notes. For example, the Frasier show bible was "scrupulously maintained", and anything established on air was included in the bible: "the name of Frasier's mother, Niles' favorite professor, Martin's favorite bar...even a list of Maris' [dozens of] food allergies". The updated bible then serves as a resource for writers to keep everything within the series consistent.

Other bibles are used as sales documents to help a television network or studio understand a series, and are sometimes given to new writers when they join the writing staff for the same reason. These types of bibles discuss the backstories of the main characters and the history of the series' fictional universe.

Television series often rely on writers' assistants and script coordinators to serve as "walking bibles" in remembering details about a series.

== Writers Guild of America ==
In the United States, writing the bible of a produced series earns that writer the 24 units of required credit necessary to qualify for membership in the Writers Guild of America.

== See also ==
- Canon (fiction)
- Prompt-book
- Institutional memory
