= Dangerous High School Girls in Trouble! =

2008 video game

- Publisher: Mousechief
- Designer: Keith Nemitz
- Platforms: Windows, Mac OS X
- Release: 2008
- Genre: Puzzle
- Mode: Single-player

Dangerous High School Girls in Trouble! is a casual video game by American independent developer Mousechief. After a series of beta releases and demos in 2007 and 2008, the finished title was released in mid-2008, with versions for both Windows and Mac OS X.

The game is set in 1920s Brigiton, a fictional community in small-town America, and involves the player guiding the activities of a group of high school girls as they explore its intrigues. Highlighting social rebellion in an era where women had only limited freedom, the title's motto declares "This is the game where good girls get better by being bad!".

== Gameplay ==
Dangerous High School Girls in Trouble! begins with the player selecting one of twelve different girls to be the "queen" (leader) of the "gang". Afterwards, basic gameplay mechanics are revealed as the player recruits three additional girls to assist her. Each girl has different scores in four different attributes: Popularity, Rebellion, Glamor, and Savvy. The game makes heavy use of the suits from a traditional deck of playing cards, representing each in-game attribute as one of the suits.

The four attributes correspond to ability in four different actions which the girls can use when interacting with others. In turn, each of the four actions, "Taunt", "Expose", "Fib", and "Gambit", has a unique mini-game associated with it. After a given girl wins a certain number of mini-games, the player is able to increase one of her attributes. In contrast, losing a mini-game can result in a girl being unavailable for a period of time, or possibly even exiled from the player's gang. Often a girl lost from the gang can be recruited again later, or a substitute can be found. However, the presence of a boyfriend can protect a given girl from being banished even temporarily. Boyfriends are typically obtained through a separate "Flirt" mini-game, which makes use of all four of a girl's attributes together. When a girl who has a boyfriend receives a penalty serious enough to leave the gang, the boyfriend instead sacrifices himself to save her.

In-game navigation involves selecting different locations on a stylized game board. The girls then travel to that location and interact with one of the individuals who is revealed to currently be present. While in some cases, the girls simply converse ("Parley") with the person, in general, the girls seek to manipulate individuals in order to obtain information or to "get away" with something. This is done by selecting an action suggested by one of the girls (e.g. "Expose" to try to reveal the truth), and then playing the corresponding mini-game. Success often advances the game plot, but can also result in other benefits, such as temporary ability bonuses. In certain cases, the choice of mini-game can affect the story. For example, taunting a teacher is usually not a good choice, as even if the player wins the "Taunt" game, the outcome may be unfavorable and may result in the loss of a girl from the gang.

== Development ==
In a November 2006 interview with Gamasutra, Keith Nemitz, the game's designer, revealed that the game had been actively in production for ten months, with an estimated six more months until completion. However, based on the game's eventual final release date, this proved to be entirely too optimistic. The inspiration for the game came from an evening of Nemitz playing an unspecified card game that attempted to distill the key features of a role-playing game down into a simpler card game. Nemitz explained, "The card game reduced entire battles down to a single dice roll, but it was really fun! The bigger idea struck me later, that you could swap out combat in RPGs with different kinds of conflict resolution mechanisms".

Describing the look and feel of the title, Nemitz noted that the user interface metaphor was that of a 1920s parlour game. David Cherry, the lead artist, deliberately made elements look worn or faded with time. In terms of trying to capture as many potential players as possible, Nemitz commented, "Our expectation is to offer a game that will tempt both experienced, casual gamers, and core gamers who like variety and novelty in their games. It is definitely a light-hearted experience, a sit-back, relax and laugh experience. The challenges should never frustrate a player, but some solutions can be very difficult".

== Reception ==
Noting that Dangerous High School Girls in Trouble! was difficult to describe, the game reviewers at "Game Tunnel" complimented the game's style and uniqueness, as well as its engrossing story. The average review score from the panel was an 8.3 out of 10, resulting in it automatically being granted a "Gold Award". The reviewer at "Jay Is Games" echoed these comments, similarly praising the game's uniqueness and the sheer quantity of story, although lamenting the need to manually scroll the game board. Despite such minor flaws, the title was still highly recommended.

Dangerous High School Girls in Trouble! was awarded a $3000 (USD) prize for "Most Innovative Game" by the Casual Games Association, and was also selected as a finalist for the 2008 IndieCade Festival of Independent Games. It was entered into the 2007 Independent Games Festival in the "Open" category, but owing to its lengthy development time, was submitted again for the 2008 Independent Games Festival as well.

At the end of 2008 GameTunnel awarded it Adventure Game of the Year, Innovative Game of the Year, and #4 in their top ten games of the year.

On January 12, 2009, the Writers Guild of America nominated it for Best Writing in a Videogame. The other nominees were Command & Conquer: Red Alert 3, Fallout 3, Star Wars: The Force Unleashed, and Tomb Raider: Underworld.

On January 29, 2009, Casual Gameplay (also Jay is Games) awarded it with Best Tabletop styled downloadable computer game. In the category, it won both the editor's award and the audience award.
