= The Memory Keeper's Daughter =

2005 novel by Kim Edwards

- Author: Kim Edwards
- Language: English
- Genre: Novel
- Publisher: Viking Press (2005); Penguin Books Doubleday Dell Publishing Group
- Publication date: 2005
- Publication place: United States
- Media type: Print (hardback & paperback)
- Pages: 401 p. (paperback edition)
- ISBN: 0-14-303714-5 (paperback edition)
- OCLC: 69010346

The Memory Keeper's Daughter is a novel by American author Kim Edwards that tells the story of a man who gives away his newborn daughter, who has Down syndrome, to one of the nurses to take to an institution, but after seeing the conditions there, she instead takes her home to raise her. Published by Viking Press in June 2005, the novel garnered great interest via word of mouth in the summer of 2006 and placed on the New York Times Paperback Bestsellers List. The novel was adapted into a television film and premiered on Lifetime Television on April 12, 2008.

== Plot ==
=== March 6, 1964 ===
In early March 1964, Dr. David Henry is forced to deliver his wife Norah's twins with the help of a nurse, Caroline Gill. Their first child, a boy they name Paul, is born a healthy perfect child, but when the second baby is born, Phoebe, David notices she has Down syndrome. David, recalling the possibility of a heart defect and early death (which his younger sister June had, dying at the young age of 12) wants to spare his family this grief and decides that the baby girl will be placed in an institution.

Caroline was given the baby to take to the institution, but simply didn't like the conditions. She decides to keep and raise Phoebe herself. While Caroline is at the store, her car runs out of gas and she is stranded in the snow with Phoebe. She is picked up by a truck driver, Al Simpson, who drives them to Caroline's home. Meanwhile, David tells Norah that their daughter died at birth. After hearing that Caroline had kept Phoebe rather than take her to the institution, David bids her to do what she thinks is right. Caroline leaves for Pittsburgh to make a fresh start with Phoebe.

=== 1965 ===
The "death" of their daughter has caused a rift in David and Norah's marriage. They move to a new home but continue to find it difficult to romantically connect. Meanwhile, Caroline begins working for Dorothy "Doro" March as a private nurse for her father, Leo. Caroline claims that Phoebe is her daughter and tells a half-true story of running away from Phoebe's father because he wanted to institutionalize Phoebe.

Caroline sends letters and pictures of Phoebe to David. David sends money to Caroline and makes a half-hearted attempt to find out where Caroline and Phoebe live. Meanwhile, Al, the truck driver who assisted Caroline on the night of Phoebe's birth, discovers her whereabouts. He and Caroline begin regular visits, and romance begins to bloom between them.

=== 1970 ===
Six years later, the distance between the Henrys has increased. David is now an aspiring photographer with his own darkroom, where he keeps Phoebe's pictures and Caroline's letters locked away. He immerses himself in his work and basically leaves the family, only coming back into their lives to complain about Paul. Norah drinks secretly and becomes overprotective of Paul.

In Pittsburgh, Phoebe is growing up a healthy child despite David's negative predictions at her birth about her mental disabilities. Caroline and the Upside Down Society, a group of other parents of children with Down syndrome, petition the school system to mainstream their children in public school.

Al still visits Caroline and has proposed to her twice. She continues to decline, although out of doubts for his fatherly love for Phoebe rather than his romantic intentions toward her. Phoebe is stung by a bee while at play and has a serious allergic reaction. Al helps Caroline take her to the hospital and steps in when a nurse's comment about Phoebe's condition outrages Caroline. Caroline realizes his genuine love for her and fatherly intentions for Phoebe. She tells Al she wants to marry him.

=== 1977 ===
Paul and Phoebe are now thirteen, and Caroline and Al have been married five years. David sends Caroline a letter, asking her to let him meet Phoebe and allow her to know her twin brother, Paul. Caroline decides not to contact David again, worried he might unknowingly hurt Phoebe.

Paul is becoming an accomplished guitarist and dreams of attending Juilliard. David and Norah live almost completely separate lives and differ on what Paul should do when he's older. Norah simply wants her son to be happy, while David pushes Paul to follow a career path that will guarantee stability, money, and success.

While on vacation in Aruba, Norah has a love affair with Howard, who is also married with children at home. David blames the affair on himself and continues to spend more and more time in his darkroom with his photographs of Phoebe.

=== 1989 ===
Paul and Phoebe are now twenty-five. Norah and David are divorced and Paul is traveling and studying music in France with his girlfriend. Phoebe is in love with Robert, who also has Down syndrome, and wants to get married and live in a group home, but Caroline is scared to let Phoebe live an independent life.

David considers making a confession to Norah about Phoebe but can't bear to go through with it. Soon afterward, he dies from a heart attack. Later, when Norah sorts through David's collection of photographs, she begins to understand him in a way she never did when they were married. Caroline comes to visit Norah and explains that Phoebe never died at all and is living with her. Norah and Paul later visit Pittsburgh and meet Phoebe for the first time. Paul drives Phoebe to their late father's grave. Paul thinks of what his twin sister might have been like if she had not been born with Down syndrome.

== Film adaptation ==
A television film adaptation directed by Mick Jackson premiered on Lifetime Television on April 12, 2008. The film's cast includes Dermot Mulroney as David, Gretchen Mol as Norah, and Emily Watson as Caroline. The adolescent and adult Phoebe is played by Krystal Hope Nausbaum, an actress with Down syndrome. The movie eliminates the characters of Doro, her father Leo, Rosemary and her son Jack. Portions of the movie were shot in Windsor, Nova Scotia.

On its premiere, 5.82 million viewers watched the film and it received a 4.0 household rating. The movie was also the most watched show on cable for the week of April 7–13, 2008. It was released to DVD in October 2008.
