= Gary Glassman =

American filmmaker

Gary Glassman is a documentary filmmaker based in Rhode Island. His company, Providence Pictures, produces films for NOVA, Discovery Channel, History Channel, BBC, and other television networks and programs.

== Early life and education ==
Glassman became interested in film and entertainment at a young age. After spending three years with a European circus, he completed an MFA program in directing at UCLA. He was attracted to documentary filmmaking because "People have amazing stories, and the world's accumulated knowledge is so rich."

== Career ==
His first documentary, Prisoners, is in the permanent collection of the Museum of Modern Art in New York and the Centre Pompidou in Paris.

Glassman started Providence Pictures in 1996, moving to Rhode Island from Paris when his wife took a job at Providence College. Since then, he has become active in the promotion of the city as a center for digital media and other creative industries, including starting the Digital City project in 2013, with Renee Hobbs, founder of the University of Rhode Island Harrington School of Communication and Media.

Glassman's The Bible's Buried Secrets, a 2008 feature on the science series NOVA on PBS, attracted some controversy for its provocative ideas, including the idea of God having a wife. According to the Christian Post, Biblical scholar William G. Dever said some bible literalists may call the film "shocking" but he said the film was the best documentary ever made on the origins of the Israelites and the writing of the first five books of the Bible, and contrasted it positively with several other similar films he was involved with, which he considered to be dishonest. The American Family Association protested the film, urging Congress to stop providing funding to PBS.

Glassman won the 2009 Writers Guild of America Award for best documentary on a subject other than current events for Secrets of the Parthenon, produced for PBS's Nova.

Glassman and Providence Pictures went to the Colosseum in Rome to install a replica of the wooden elevator used by the Romans to move animals into the center of the arena, and produced the documentary Colosseum: Roman Death Trap about the project. It was one of a series of documentaries the company did for NOVA called "Building Wonders".

One of his favorite of his films is Secret of Photo 51, about Rosalind Franklin's importance in the discovery of the DNA double helix that Watson & Crick took credit for.
