= Dawn Lambertsen Kelly =

Dawn Lambertsen Kelly, aka Dawn Kelly, is an American television writer and writer's assistant. She wrote an episode of the second series of Lost, and was also a writer's assistant on the show. The Lost writing staff were nominated for the Writers Guild of America (WGA) Award for Best Dramatic Series at the February 2007 ceremony for their work on the second and third seasons. She has also been a writer's assistant for Antoine Fuqua, and has collaborated with him on four of his films.
