= Leslie Nipkow =

American essayist, television writer, playwright, and actress

Leslie Nipkow is an American essayist, television writer, playwright, and actress.

== Positions held ==
Guarding Erica

- performer/playwright (published in Vintage Books anthology: Talk to Me: Monologue Plays)

As the World Turns (hired by Jean Passanante)

- Script Writer: September 4, 2007 - January 24, 2008; April 18, 2008 - July 31, 2008; November 13, 2008 - January 7, 2009; July 24, 2009 - September 17, 2010, end of series

One Life to Live (hired by Gary Tomlin)

- Script Writer: 2000 - September 19, 2005
- Occasional Script Writer: September 20, 2005 - August 17, 2007
- Script Editor: September 20, 2005 - October 3, 2007

== Awards and nominations ==
Daytime Emmy Award

- Winner, 2008, Best Writing, One Life to Live
- Nomination, 2011, Best Writing, As the World Turns
- Nomination, 2010, Best Writing, As the World Turns
- Nomination, 2006, Best Writing, One Life to Live
- Nomination, 2002, Best Writing, One Life to Live

Writers Guild of America Award

- Winner, 2011, Best Writing, As the World Turns
- Winner, 2009, Best Writing, As the World Turns
- Nomination, 2010, Best Writing, As the World Turns
- Nomination, 2005, Best Writing, One Life to Live
- Nomination, 2003, Best Writing, One Life to Live
