= The Hunting Party (Lost) =

- Lost episode
- Episode no.: Season 2 Episode 11
- Directed by: Stephen Williams
- Written by: Elizabeth Sarnoff; Christina M. Kim
- Production code: 211
- Original air date: January 18, 2006
- Running time: 43 minutes

Guest appearances
- John Terry as Christian Shephard; M. C. Gainey as Other; Monica Dean as Gabriela Busoni; Ronald Guttman as Angelo Busoni; Julie Bowen as Sarah

Episode chronology
← Previous "The 23rd Psalm"	Next → "Fire + Water"
- Lost season 2

"The Hunting Party" is the 36th episode of Lost. It is the 11th episode of the second season. The episode was directed by Stephen Williams, and written by Elizabeth Sarnoff, and Christina M. Kim. It first aired on January 18, 2006, on ABC. The character of Jack Shephard is featured in the episode's flashbacks.

== Plot ==
=== Flashbacks ===
Jack Shephard and his father, Christian, discuss the effectiveness of surgery on an Italian man, Angelo Busoni, with a spinal tumor. Christian advises against the surgery. However, Angelo's daughter, Gabriela, tells Christian, "We didn't come for you." She and Angelo had read about the miraculous recovery of Sarah, Jack's wife, and hope that Jack can work another miracle. Jack agrees to operate, despite Christian's disapproval. After one long night, Jack returns home to Sarah, who says that she has taken a pregnancy test after being late for her period; the test is negative. Later, when Gabriela is in Jack's office, signing release forms, Jack warns her of the risks of surgery, but she decides to proceed. Christian walks in on them as they share a quiet moment. When Gabriela leaves, Christian warns Jack about the dangers of getting too close to his patients. The surgery is not successful and Angelo dies on the operating table due to heart failure. Jack tells Christian that he will break the news to Gabriela. Christian replies that he has already told her and she has left the hospital. Jack finds Gabriela in the parking lot, crying over Angelo's death. He tries to console her, and the two end up kissing. Jack pulls away and leaves, telling Gabriela that "[he] can't". At home, Jack confesses to Sarah that he kissed another woman, but promises that he will change. As he holds her, Sarah pulls away and admits that she has met someone else and she is leaving him. Her things are already packed. "You will always need something to fix", she says before leaving.

=== On the Island ===
Jack discovers Locke, who is unconscious in the hatch's gun cache. Michael then enters with rifle pointed at Jack, announcing that he is going into the jungle to retrieve his son, Walt, who has been taken by the Others. Jack tries to reason with him, and volunteers to assist Michael in his task. However, Michael refuses to listen, saying that he must go alone. Jack asks Michael if he would really shoot him, to which Michael replies, "No, but I'll shoot that computer." Michael adds that the computer is "not what you think it is." Jack backs down, and Michael leaves after locking him with Locke in the gun closet.

After being freed by Kate and Sawyer, who show up to get Sawyer's bandages changed, Jack intends to go after Michael. Locke and Sawyer volunteer to accompany him, and Jack refuses Kate's request to come as well, explaining that she must stay to take care of the button.

While searching for Michael, Locke reveals that he is aware of Sawyer's real name, James Ford, since Hurley gave him the passenger manifest. Locke asks why Sawyer chose that name, but Sawyer refuses to answer. Gunshots are then heard. Jack, Sawyer, and Locke continue hiking towards the source of the shots. They find shell casings from Michael's gun.

That night, while Jack and Locke argue about whether to turn back or keep searching, they are met by the bearded boat captain who previously kidnapped Walt. (Note: In the episode "Exodus".) The man calls them by name and knows personal details about them. He says Walt is fine and Michael will not find him. The man adds, "This is not your island, this is our island, and the only reason you're living on it is because we let you live on it", and scolds them for "opening doors that they shouldn't be opening". He tells them to leave their weapons and go back, and that the Others will then leave them in peace. Jack refuses, believing the man is bluffing and that there are not that many "Others". The man calls out to his unseen companions, and a dozen torches ignite, surrounding Jack, Locke and Sawyer. The bearded man then calls for "Alex" to "bring her out". A bound-and-gagged Kate is brought forth, and the man puts a gun to her neck. It is revealed that Kate was captured while secretly trailing Jack, Sawyer, and Locke. Jack relents, and lays his weapons down. Locke and Sawyer follow. Kate is let go, and the Others leave, threatening to return if the castaways "cross the line."

In the bunker, Hurley and Charlie go through the LP record collection, finding one by a group named Geronimo Jackson. Hurley then asks Charlie what chances he has with Libby, though Charlie is preoccupied thinking about Claire. On the beach, Jin and Sun confess to each other that neither wants to be told what to do.

Upon returning to camp, Jack refuses to hear Kate's apology. Sawyer consoles her, saying he would have done the same thing if Jack had told him to stay behind. Jack later speaks to Ana Lucia on the beach. He questions her about her past as a police officer and asks "How long would it take to train an army?".

== Reception ==
19.13 million viewers watched the episode's first United States airing. The LA Times liked the Jack flashback and "that cool moment when the Others light their torches", but disliked the progress of the story and the cliffhanger that "never went anywhere."
