= Matt Ragghianti =

Matt "Raggs" Ragghianti is an American television writer and writer's assistant. He wrote an episode of the second season of Lost and was a writer's assistant during the first two seasons of the show. The Lost writing staff were nominated for the Writers Guild of America (WGA) Award for Best Dramatic Series at the February 2007 ceremony for their work on the second and third seasons.
