= Script coordinator =

Role in a film/TV crew who produces script drafts

A script coordinator is a role in the production of a film or television series. The script coordinator is responsible for producing each draft of the script and annotating it for ease of use for the production team.

On a television series the script coordinator is responsible for liaising between the writing and production departments. The writers deliver the first draft of a script to the script coordinator who prepares it for the production team and handles any clearance issues. Clearance refers to the need to check the script for potential legal problems and ensure that all names are cleared by the legal department.

The script coordinator must check the draft for proper formatting, spelling, punctuation and continuity before releasing the draft. Once a script has been released, other members of the production team offer notes to the writers necessitating revisions to the script. The process of how widely each draft is released (e.g. just to the writers, then to the writers and producers and then to the network) varies from show to show.

With each round of revisions the script coordinator must ensure that the changes are clearly marked, re-issue the script and again check the script for errors. Many script coordinators are also responsible for foreign language translations and compiling a show bible that tracks plot points and character introductions as a reference tool.

A script coordinator is a distinct role from script supervisor. A script supervisor is responsible for on-set annotation of the script for editing purposes rather than pre-production coordination of the script to facilitate production. A script coordinator is considered a junior role in the writing staff and becoming a full-time screenwriter is typically a common promotion from being a script coordinator.
