= One of Them =

- Lost episode
- Episode no.: Season 2 Episode 14
- Directed by: Stephen Williams
- Written by: Damon Lindelof; Carlton Cuse
- Production code: 214
- Original air date: February 15, 2006
- Running time: 44 minutes

Guest appearances
- Michael Emerson as Henry Gale; Clancy Brown as Kelvin Inman; Mira Furlan as Danielle Rousseau; Lindsey Ginter as Sam Austen; Marc Casabani as Tariq; Theo Rossi as Sgt. Tony Buccelli; Thomas Mehary as U.S. soldier; Kamari Borden as U.S. soldier

Episode chronology
← Previous "The Long Con"	Next → "Maternity Leave"
- Lost season 2

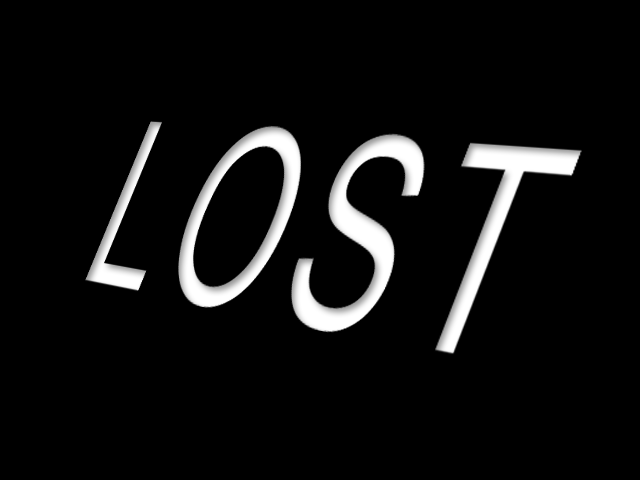
The LOST logo

"One of Them" is the 39th episode of Lost and the 14th episode of the second season. The episode was directed by Stephen Williams, and written by Damon Lindelof and Carlton Cuse. It first aired on February 15, 2006, on ABC. The character of Sayid Jarrah (Naveen Andrews) is featured in the episode's flashbacks. In the episode, the survivors meet and interrogate Henry Gale (Michael Emerson), a man whom they believe to be an "Other".

== Plot ==
=== Flashback ===
The 1991 Allied invasion of Iraq is under way. Sayid, an Iraqi soldier, burns documents with fellow soldiers. Some are resisting, and as Sayid's commanding officer Tariq orders them to continue, American troops burst in. Sayid tries to lie, saying that their commanding officer has abandoned them. However, the American soldier, Sam Austen (Lindsey Ginter) (who is also Kate's father) does not believe him.

Sayid is held captive by the Americans, who have found Tariq. Two higher-ranked military men ask Sayid to act as a translator, and he attempts to get his CO to reveal the location of a captive American pilot. Speaking in their own language, which the Americans cannot understand, Sayid's CO orders him to grab the American's gun and kill as many as he can. However, Sayid refuses. Austen knows they cannot get the information and call in the next man; American DIA agent Kelvin Inman (Clancy Brown) orders Sayid to torture the Iraqi officer; at first, Sayid refuses this too, but agrees after the agent shows a video of Sayid's family being gassed on the officer's orders. While interrogating the officer, Sayid learns that it is too late, and that the pilot had been executed anyway. Sayid is eventually released by the Americans, who are pulling out.

In the truck, Austen asks Sayid if he has a wife or kids, to which he shakes his head. Inman says that the day will come when Sayid needs information from someone — and that he will have the means to get it. He can speak Arabic, much to Sayid's shock. However, Sayid vows never to torture again. Before he leaves, Inman gives him several hundred American dollars for a "bus ride back to Ramadi".

=== On the island ===
Ana Lucia Cortez (Michelle Rodriguez) takes Sayid into the jungle, and he tells her to go back after seeing Danielle Rousseau (Mira Furlan), who was looking for him. Danielle asks Sayid to follow her, but he does not trust her, since she previously stole Claire's baby. She gives him her gun as a symbol of trust.

Danielle takes Sayid to a man she captured. Danielle tells Sayid not to let him go, because she thinks he is "one of them". The man identifies himself as Henry Gale (a reference to Dorothy Gale's Uncle Henry in The Wizard of Oz) from Minnesota. Ignoring Danielle's warning, Sayid frees the man, who attempts to flee until she shoots him in the back with a crossbow.

Sayid brings him to the hatch and tells John Locke (Terry O'Quinn) that he needs to talk to Henry. Henry claims he and his wife were in a hot air balloon that crashed on the island about four months before. Jack Shephard (Matthew Fox) interrupts and notices Henry's injury. Sayid explains that it was not treated because they want to learn as much as they can about Henry while he is still wounded. Jack intervenes and removes the arrow. Sayid tells Jack not to untie Henry. Sayid asks Locke to change the combination in the armory, so he can find out more by torturing Henry in a secure room. Sayid tells Jack to put him in the armory so no one else will see him.

There, Sayid interrogates Henry, who says he was rich because he owned a company that mined for non-metallic minerals. He supposedly met his wife at the University of Minnesota. After crashing on the island, Henry claims that his wife got sick three weeks earlier, starting with a fever, degrading to delirium and ultimately resulting in her death. He also says he dug his wife's grave near where they crashed. Sayid starts questioning more ferociously, threatening to break Henry's finger.

Meanwhile, James "Sawyer" Ford (Josh Holloway) cannot sleep due to a chirping noise coming from the jungle. He asks Jin Kwon (Daniel Dae Kim) to help him find the source of the noise. Jin ignores him instead, so Sawyer goes into the jungle alone, and eventually discovers Hugo "Hurley" Reyes (Jorge Garcia) eating from a hidden stash of food from the hatch. Hurley says that the noise is coming from a tree frog. Sawyer blackmails Hurley, saying he will not tell anyone else about the secret stash, if Hurley helps him track the frog. While searching though, Sawyer mocks Hurley for his weight. Hurley decides to return to the beach alone, saying that though he stole food, people still like him, unlike Sawyer. Sawyer apologizes and convinces Hurley to carry on. They eventually find the frog. Hurley offers to release the frog two beaches away, but Sawyer kills it instead.

In response to Sayid's questioning, Henry cannot recount the specific details of burying his wife. Sayid believes he is lying, stating he would know every last detail about digging his wife's grave. Henry then realizes that Sayid had lost someone close to him on the island. Sayid beats him as Jack and Locke listen from outside. Jack takes action by holding Locke, preventing him from entering the numbers at the appointed time, telling him he will only let Locke go if he opens the door. The timer goes below a minute and Locke complies by unlocking the armory and then dashing for the computer. By the time he unlocks the door, there were only ten seconds left. He begins typing the code. As the timer passes zero, the numbers flip over to symbols. Two are Egyptian hieroglyphs, two are unknown characters and another square does not stop turning. The Symbols are accompanied with the sound of a machine "spooling up" like a jet engine turbine. Locke hits the 'Execute' button, the timer resets to 108 and the sound dies down. Meanwhile, in the armory, Jack stops an enraged Sayid. They lock a bloodied Henry back in the armory.

Sayid thinks Henry is an "Other" because he feels no guilt about torturing him. On the beach, he tells Charlie that Jack and Locke will never understand that feeling, because they have forgotten what the Others have done to them. Stating that the Others are merciless, he asks Charlie if he remembers how they hanged him from the tree and kidnapped Claire.

== Production ==
In 2001, American actor Michael Emerson won an Emmy award for his guest appearance as serial killer William Hinks on The Practice. The Lost producers liked his work on The Practice, so they were keen to cast Emerson in the role of "Henry Gale", as they thought he would fit the character well. Emerson was originally contracted to appear in just three episodes of Lost, making his first appearance midway through the second season, in this episode. The producers later contracted him for another five episodes, and he would later be made a part of the main cast in the third season.

== Reception ==
18.20 million viewers watched this episode.
