= Gil Bellows on screen and stage =

Gil Bellows
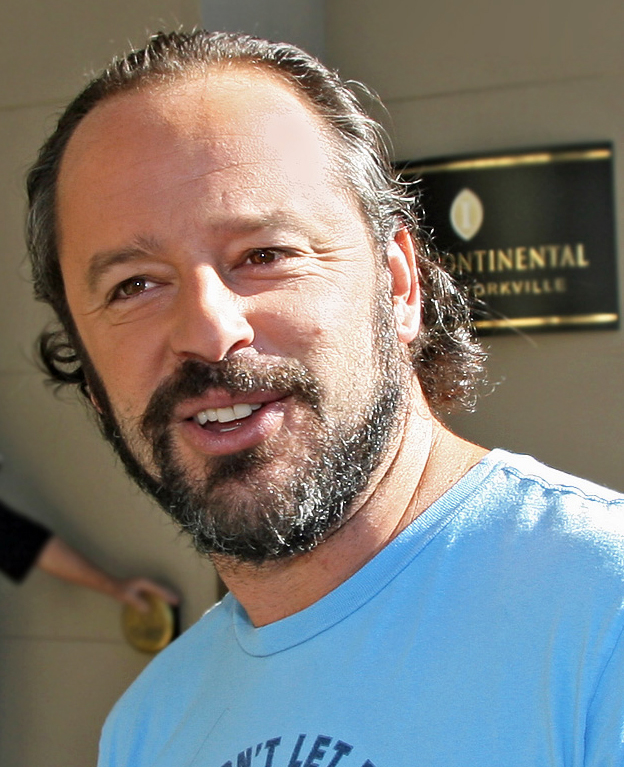
- Bellows in 2012
- Born: June 28, 1967 (age 59); Vancouver, British Columbia, Canada
- Occupation: Actor
- Years active: 1988–present

Gil Bellows (born June 28, 1967) is a Canadian actor, producer, screenwriter, and director. Upon graduating from the American Academy of Dramatic Arts, he began acting in films and television. Bellows also earned critical acclaim for his stage performances in The Snake and the Vein (1990-1992) and Flaubert's Latest (1992). For his first starring role in Love and a .45 (1994), his acting received positive reviews. Bellows gained wide attention for his performance as Tommy, a pivotal role in The Shawshank Redemption (1994). The film was nominated for seven Academy Awards including “Best Picture” and is considered by many to be one of the greatest films ever made.

On television, Bellows is best known for playing Billy Thomas, the romantic lead in the popular Fox ’s legal dramedy series Ally McBeal (1997–2002). His performance earned him a Screen Actors Guild Award, and when his character finally united with the title character, the show reached a record-breaking audience of nearly 17 million viewers.

Throughout his career Bellows, has continued to work in both film and television. His film credits include The Weather Man (2005), House at the End of the Street (2012), and Scary Stories to Tell in the Dark (2019). On television, he has had recurring roles in Smallville (2010), American Gods (2021), Chucky (2023-2024), and more.

As a producer, Bellows has several notable accomplishments, including Mick Jackson’s HBO biographical drama Temple Grandin (2010), which earned him both a Primetime Emmy Award and a Peabody Award. He produced, starred in, co-wrote, and co-directed the film 3 Days in Havana (2013), and also produced the Amazon Prime Video series Patriot (2015–2017), where he received story credits as well.

== Stage works ==
- A Snake in the Vein (1990–1992)
- Flaubert's Latest (1992)
- The best of schools (circa early 1990s)
- 24-Hour Play (2002)
- Great Writers Series: The Ox-Bow Incident (2004)

== Films ==
Year	Title	Role	Producer	Notes	Ref.
1989	The First Season	Ronne			
1994	Love and a .45	Watty Watts			
1994	The Shawshank Redemption	Tommy Williams			
1995	Miami Rhapsody	Matt			
1995	Black Day Blue Night	Hitchhiker Dodge			
1996	The Substance of Fire	Val Chenard			
1997	Snow White: A Tale of Terror	Will			
1997	Witch Way Love	Michael			
1997	White Lies	Punk Guy			
1997	The Assistant	Frank Alpine			
1997	Dinner at Fred's	Richard			
1998	Say You'll Be Mine	Mason			
1998	Judas Kiss	Lizard Browning			
2000	Beautiful Joe	Elton			
2000	Chasing Sleep	Detective Derm			
2003	Fast Food High	Dale White			
2003	Blind Horizon	Dr. Theodore Conway			
2004	EMR	Paramedic			
2004	How's My Driving	Jimmy		Short film	
2004	Childstar	Isaac			
2004	Pursued	Ben Keats			
2005	Keep Your Distance	David Dailey			
2005	Sweet Land		Co-producer	Producer only	
2005	The Weather Man	Don			
2008	The Promotion	Mitch			
2008	Kill Kill Faster Faster	Joe	Producer		
2008	Black Crescent Moon	Sam			
2008	Passchendaele	Royster			
2008	Toronto Stories	Henry			
2010	Happenchance	Stan		Short film	
2010	Unthinkable	Agent Vincent			
2010	A Night for Dying Tigers	Jack			
2010	Hunt to Kill	Banks			
2010	Neighbors	Vern		Short film	
2011	The Year Dolly Parton Was My Mom	Phil			
2011	Girl Walks into a Bar	Emmit			
2011	The Maiden Danced to Death	Fred			
2012	The Samaritan	Bartender Bill			
2012	House at the End of the Street	Officer Bill Weaver			
2013	Mad Ship	Archie Cameron			
2013	Louis Cyr	Richard Kyle Fox			
2013	Parkland	David Powers			
2013	3 Days in Havana	Jack Petty	Producer	Also co-director and co-writer	
2014	Extraterrestrial	Sheriff Murphy			
2014	Leading Lady	Daniel Taylor			
2014	The Calling	Detective Ray Green			
2014	Kill the Messenger	DEA Agent Miller			
2015	Girl on the Edge	Jake Green			
2015	Weepah Way for Now	John			
2015	Life on the Line	Pok' Chop			
2015	Business Ethics	Zachary Cranston	Executive producer	Short film	
2016	Dead Draw	Harrison			
2016	She Has a Name	Alex			
2017	Blood Honey	Marvin Heath			
2017	ADDicted	Professor Jeff Mueller			
2019	Run This Town	Detective Lowey			
2019	Nation's Fire	Josip Aleksander			
2019	Scary Stories to Tell in the Dark	Chief Turner			
2019	Business Ethics	Edwin Murk	Executive producer		
2019	Drowning	Frank			
2020	Two Deaths of Henry Baker	Henry Baker / Sam Bird			
2021	Awake	Dr. Katz			
2026	Voicemails for Isabelle	Jill and Isabelle's Dad			
2026	How We Stand				
2027	The Exorcist: Martyrs †	Peter Nicks		Post-production	

== Television ==
Year	Title	Role	Producer	Notes	Ref.
1991	Law & Order	Howard Metzler		Episode: "The Violence of Summer"	
1992	Flying Blind	Gerard		Episode: "Single White Eurotrash"	
1993	Going to Extremes	Ben		2 episodes	
1995	Silver Strand	Brian Del Piso		TV movie	
1996	Radiant City	Bert Kramer		TV movie	
1997–2002	Ally McBeal	Billy Thomas		68 episodes	
1998	The Practice	Billy Thomas		Episode: "Axe Murderer"	
1999	Ally	Billy Thomas		13 episodes	
2000	The Courage to Love	Dr. Gerard Gaultier		TV movie	
2001	Night Visions	Keith Miller		Episode: "Dead Air/Renovation"	
2001	Mermaid Chronicles Part 1: She Creature	Miles		TV movie	
2001–2002	The Agency	Matt Callan		23 episodes	
2002	Whitewash: The Clarence Bradley Story	Mike De Guerin		TV movie	
2002	Second String	Dan Heller		TV movie	
2003	1st to Die	Chris Raleigh		TV movie	
2003	The Twilight Zone	Maj. Rob Malone		Episode: "Homecoming"	
2004	Karen Sisco	Special Agent Donny Pepper		Episode: "Dog Day Sisco"	
2004	Zeyda and the Hitman	Jeff Klein		TV movie	
2004	Cooking Lessons	Professor Mocha		TV movie	
2004	A Bear Named Winnie	Colonel Barret		TV movie	
2005	Terminal City	Ari Sampson		10 episodes	
2006	Final Days of Planet Earth	Lloyd Walker		TV movie	
2008	The Cleaner	Mickey Efros		Episode: "Pilot"	
2008	Infected	Ben Mosher		TV movie	
2008	24: Redemption	Frank Tramell		TV movie	
2010	Smallville	Maxwell Lord		2 episodes	
2010	FlashForward	Timothy		3 episodes	
2010	Goblin	Neil Perkins		TV movie	
2010	Criminal Minds	Jeff Joyce		Episode: "JJ"	
2010	Temple Grandin		Executive Producer	Producer only	
2010–2012	True Justice	Nikoli Putin		4 episodes	
2011	Sanctuary	Caleb		2 episodes	
2011	Trading Christmas	Ray Johnson		TV movie	
2012	Boss	Vacarro		2 episodes	
2012	Vegas	George Grady		3 episodes	
2013	Delete	Lt. General Michael Overson		2 episodes	
2014	CSI: Crime Scene Investigation	Lee Berman		Episode: "Kitty"	
2014	Falling Skies	Nick Phillips		Episode: "Mind Wars"	
2014	Bones	Mason Barnes		Episode: "The Money Maker on the Merry-Go-Round"	
2014	Ascension	Harris Enzmann		3 episodes	
2015–2018	Patriot	Lawrence Lacroix	Executive producer	14 episodes - Also story writer	
2016	11.22.63	FBI Agent James P. Hosty		2 episodes	
2016	Eyewitness	Gabe Caldwell		10 episodes	
2017	Between Us	Matt		TV short	
2018	The Detectives	Det. Peter Baker		Episode: "Nine Shots"	
2019	The Handmaid's Tale	Doctor		Episode: "Heroic"	
2019	Suits	Dan Foley		Episode: "Windmills"	
2019	Jett	Evans		9 episodes	
2020	Cherish the Day	Therapist		Episode: "Synopsis"	
2020	The Twilight Zone	Dick Warren		Episode: "You Might Also Like"	
2020	Love in the Time of Corona	Paul		4 episodes	
2021	American Gods	Bill Sanders		3 episodes	
2022	Women of the Movement	Gerald Chatham		4 episodes	
2023–2024	Chucky	Warren Pryce		6 episodes	
2024	Alert: Missing Persons Unit	Inspector Hollis Braun		6 episodes	
2025	Law & Order Toronto: Criminal Intent	CSIS Toronto Region Director Tom			
