= Sebastian Gutiérrez (director) =

Venezuelan film director and screenwriter

- Born: September 10, 1974 (age 52); Caracas, Venezuela
- Occupations: Film director, screenwriter, film producer
- Years active: 1994–present
- Partner(s): Carla Gugino (1996–present)

Sebastián Gutiérrez (born September 10, 1974) is a Venezuelan film director, screenwriter and film producer. He wrote the screenplays to the films Gothika, Snakes on a Plane, The Eye and The Big Bounce, and wrote and directed two independent ensemble comedies, Women in Trouble and Elektra Luxx.

Gutiérrez has also won the Critics' Award at the Festival du Film Policier de Cognac for his directorial debut Judas Kiss.

In 2019, the Cinemax series Jett he created premiered, and he also wrote, directed as well as executive produced all of its episodes.

== Career ==
Gutiérrez wrote and directed one of the first motion pictures made expressly for internet distribution, the ensemble crime comedy Girl Walks into a Bar, starring Carla Gugino, Rosario Dawson, Robert Forster, Danny DeVito, Josh Hartnett and Alexis Bledel, among others. Gutiérrez cowrote a song for the film, "Only Bad Can Come", with composer Grant Lee Phillips.

As a screenwriter, he has written Gothika, Snakes on a Plane, The Eye, The Big Bounce and Hotel Noir.

He has written and directed two independent female-driven ensemble comedies, Women in Trouble and Elektra Luxx, revolving around a group of Los Angeles women. The two movies are part of a trilogy with the third movie already announced, Women In Ecstasy. Carla Gugino stars as the namesake character Elektra Luxx, a recently retired porn star trying to figure out how to lead a "normal" life, along with Connie Britton, Julianne Moore, Joseph Gordon-Levitt, Josh Brolin, Simon Baker, Emmanuelle Chriqui and Adrianne Palicki.

He is also the creator of the Cinemax crime drama TV series Jett, as well as the writer, director and executive producer of all of its episodes, which debuted in 2019 and stars Carla Gugino as the title character, a skilled ex-professional thief named Daisy "Jett" Kowalski.

== Recurring actors ==
Gutiérrez usually works with a revolving company of actors which include:

- Carla Gugino, who plays the lead in many of Gutierrez's films (Judas Kiss, She Creature, Women in Trouble, Elektra Luxx, Girl Walks into a Bar, Hotel Noir, Elizabeth Harvest, Jett, Leopard Skin)
- Robert Forster plays roles in Rise: Blood Hunter, Girl Walks into a Bar, Hotel Noir
- Joseph Gordon-Levitt has roles in Women in Trouble, Elektra Luxx
- Simon Baker stars in Judas Kiss, Women in Trouble
- Danny DeVito stars in Girl Walks into a Bar, Hotel Noir
- Gil Bellows plays roles in Judas Kiss, She Creature, Girl Walks into a Bar, Jett
- Emmanuelle Chriqui stars in Women in Trouble, Elektra Luxx, Girl Walks into a Bar
- Rosario Dawson stars in Girl Walks into a Bar, Hotel Noir
- Gaite Jansen stars in Jett, Leopard Skin
- Gentry White has roles in Jett, Leopard Skin
- Rufus Sewell stars in She Creature, Hotel Noir

== Personal life ==
In 1996, Gutiérrez began a relationship with his collaborator, actress Carla Gugino. Gugino stated in 2009 that they had no plans to marry: "Marriage isn't important for us. We like being boyfriend and girlfriend; there's something sexy and fun about that. We're very much about, 'There's nothing holding us here other than our desire to be together.'"

== Filmography ==
=== Film ===
Year	Title	Director	Writer	Producer
1998	Judas Kiss	Yes	Yes	No
2003	Gothika	No	Yes	No
2004	The Big Bounce	No	Yes	No
2006	Snakes on a Plane	No	Yes	No
2007	Rise: Blood Hunter	Yes	Yes	No
2008	The Eye	No	Yes	No
2009	Women in Trouble	Yes	Yes	Yes
2009	Master of None	Yes	Yes	Yes
2010	Tell-Tale	No	Yes	No
2010	Elektra Luxx	Yes	Yes	Yes
2011	Girl Walks into a Bar	Yes	Yes	Yes
2012	Hotel Noir	Yes	Yes	Yes
2018	Elizabeth Harvest	Yes	Yes	No

Executive producer

- 3 Days in Havana (2013)

Acting roles

Year	Title	Role
1994	The Upstairs Neighbor	Eric
1995	Toughguy	Eric Espinoza
1996	Wedding Bell Blues	Gustavo

=== Television ===
Year	Title	Director	Writer	Executive Producer	Notes
2001	She Creature	Yes	Yes	No	TV movie
2004	Karen Sisco	No	Yes	No	Episode "Dog Day Sisco" (Unaired)
2019	Jett	Yes	Yes	Yes	9 episodes
2022	Leopard Skin	Yes	Yes	Yes	8 episodes

== Awards and nominations ==
- Won – 1999 Critics Award for Judas Kiss // Cognac Festival du Film Policier, France
- Nominated – 1999 Grand Prix for Judas Kiss // Paris Film Festival, France
