= Cameron Richardson =

American actress, model and producer (born 1979)

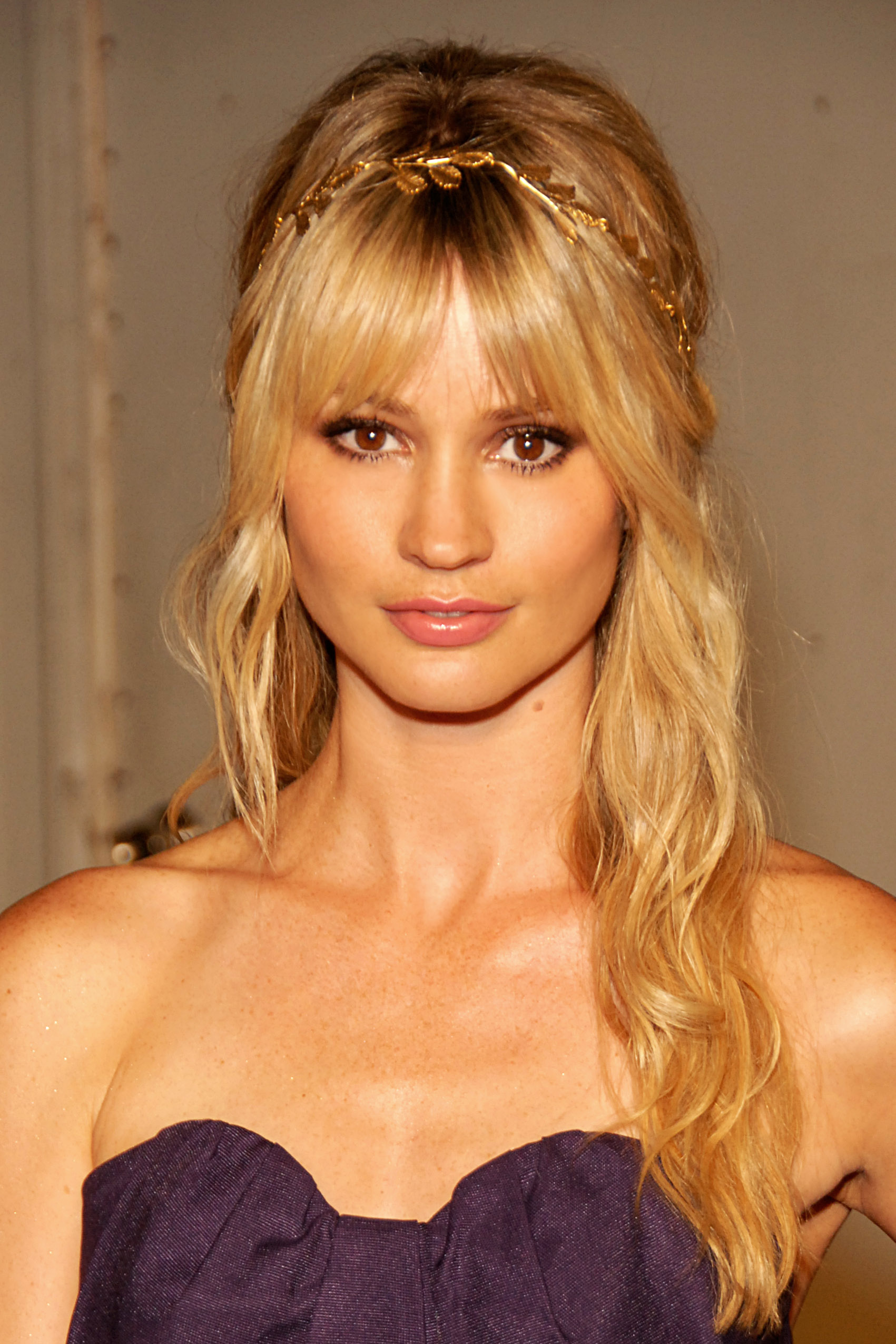
- Richardson in 2009
- Born: September 11, 1979 (age 47); Baton Rouge, Louisiana, U.S.
- Occupations: Actress, model, producer
- Years active: 1994–present
- Spouse: Louis Leterrier (m. 2021)
- Children: 3
- Modeling information
- Height: 5 ft 8 in (1.73 m)
- Hair color: Blonde
- Eye color: Brown

Cameron Richardson (born September 11, 1979) is an American actress, model and producer best known for playing Chloe Carter on the CBS television miniseries Harper's Island in 2009.

== Early life ==
Born on September 11, 1979, in Baton Rouge, Louisiana, Richardson grew up in New Jersey. She graduated from Old Bridge High School in Old Bridge Township, New Jersey. She moved to New York City to pursue modeling, and her agents suggested acting. Richardson was called Cam-Bones because she was thin.

== Career ==
=== Modeling ===
Richardson modeled for Mademoiselle, Interview, Cosmopolitan, and other fashion magazines. She appeared on the cover of Ocean Drive in 2006. She was cover model for the January–February 2008 issue of Women's Health Magazine. She has modeled clothes for American Eagle Outfitters, GAP, Lucky Brand Jeans, Chic Jeans, and Roxy amongst others. She advertised Dasani bottled water from The Coca-Cola Company. As of 2010, she can be seen modeling for Forever 21's maternity line.

Richardson appeared in a 2004 advertising campaign for burger chain Carl's Jr./Hardee's in which she ate a Western style burger while riding a mechanical bull to the tune of "Slow Ride" by Foghat.

=== Acting ===
Richardson guest starred on the FOX television show House (2006; S02 E13; "Skin Deep"). She played 15-year-old supermodel Alex, having herself been a model before getting into acting. She is known for her role as Paula Hargrove in the Fox series Point Pleasant (2005). She also guest starred on the HBO television show Entourage in the episodes "Strange Days", "Dog Day Afternoon, and "The Big Bang", in which she played a waitress named Lindsay who has a tryst in the coat room with character Vincent Chase during a silent auction.

Richardson appeared in the film Alvin and the Chipmunks (2007).

In 2009, Richardson was a series regular on Harper's Island, a murder mystery television series. Promotions for the series describe her character Chloe as The Flirt.

In 2012, Richardson appeared in an episode of CSI: Crime Scene Investigation entitled "Malice in Wonderland".

In 2013, Cameron Richardson played the role of Cheryl, Kev's (ex-)wife, on the show Shameless (season 3).

=== Music videos ===
In 2002, Richardson appeared in the music video for the Incubus song "Are You In?"

In 2011, she appeared in the videos of the country song "I Don't Want This Night to End" and "Drunk On You" with Luke Bryan.

In 2014, Richardson appeared in the music video of the song "Wanted Man" by The Last Internationale.

== Awards ==
Richardson was ranked #76 in Stuff magazine's "102 Sexiest Women In The World" (2002). She was named #52 on the Maxim "Hot 100 of 2005" list, and modeled for the cover of the Hot 100 supplement.

She appeared on the list until 2009 when she ranked #76.

== Filmography ==
=== Film ===
Year	Title	Role	Notes
2002	Frank McKlusky, C.I.	Sharon Webber	
2003	National Lampoon's Barely Legal	Rachael Unger	
2003	National Lampoon Presents Dorm Daze	Adrienne	
2005	The Good Humor Man	Wendy	
2005	Supercross	Piper Cole	
2006	Open Water 2: Adrift	Michelle	
2007	Rise: Blood Hunter	Collette	
2007	Alvin and the Chipmunks	Claire Wilson	
2008	I Heart Veronica Martin	Veronica Martin	Short film
2008	Familiar Strangers	Erin Worthington	
2009	Women in Trouble	Darby	
2010	Wreckage	Kate	
2010	Hard Breakers	Alexis Bell	
2011	4.2.3.	Eva	Short film
2012	Hotel Noir	Maureen Chapman	
2012	Vanished	Alex	Short film
2012	Last Call	Kiki	Short film
2012	For A Single Moment	Sarah Lane	
2013	Holy Ghost People	Sister Sheila	
2013	The Jogger	Carol	
2014	10.0 Earthquake	Emily	
2014	The Last Beat	Valerie Eason	
2015	Something About Her	Kristen	
2015	The Evil Gene	Dr. Dana Ehrhart	
2016	Get a Job	Tara	
2017	Hickok	Mattie	
2017	Flashburn	Kalie Jorgensen	
2017	Dead Ant	Love	
2021	Something About Her	Kristen	

=== Television ===
Year	Title	Role	Notes
2000–2001	Cover Me	Celeste Arno	Main role (24 episodes)
2003–2004	Skin	Darlene	Recurring role (5 episodes)
2005–2006	Point Pleasant	Paula Hargrove	Regular role (13 episodes)
2006	If You Lived Here, You'd Be Home Now	Amy	TV film
2006	House	Alex	Episode: "Skin Deep"
2006	Entourage	Waitress	Episode: "Strange Days"
2007	Entourage	Lindsay	Episode: "Dog Day Afternoon"
2008	12 Miles of Bad Road	McKenna Shakespeare Hall	Recurring role (6 episodes)
2009	Harper's Island	Chloe Carter	Main cast (10 episodes)
2011	Entourage	Lindsay	Episode: "The Big Bang"
2011	The Indestructible Jimmy Brown	Alison	TV film
2012	CSI: Crime Scene Investigation	Emily Hartley	Episode: "Malice in Wonderland"
2013	Shameless	Cheryl	Episodes: "The American Dream", "May I Trim Your Hedges?"
2014	Murder in the First	Hannah Harkins	Episodes: "Who's Your Daddy", "Suck My Alibi", "Win Some, Lose Some"
2014	The Lottery	Tracy Williams	Episodes: "Genie", "Crystal City"
2019	Vida	Instagram girlfriend	Episode 2.4
