= Girl Walks into a Bar =

- Theatrical poster
- Directed by: Sebastián Gutiérrez
- Written by: Sebastián Gutiérrez
- Produced by: Steve Bing; Richard Rosenblatt; Sebastián Gutiérrez; Zach Schwartz
- Starring: Carla Gugino; Zachary Quinto; Josh Hartnett; Danny DeVito; Rosario Dawson; Emmanuelle Chriqui; Robert Forster
- Cinematography: Cale Finot
- Edited by: Lisa Bromwell
- Music by: Grant Lee Phillips
- Production companies: Lexus; Shangri-La Entertainment; Jersey Films
- Distributed by: YouTube (internet); Wrekin Hill Entertainment (DVD)
- Release dates: March 7, 2011 (Los Angeles); March 11, 2011 (internet); August 14, 2012 (DVD)
- Running time: 80 minutes
- Country: United States
- Language: English
- Budget: $1 million

Girl Walks into a Bar is a 2011 multiple story line ensemble comedy film produced exclusively for Internet distribution. It was written and directed by Sebastián Gutiérrez, like the anthology style of Gutiérrez's Women in Trouble, and follows a group of apparent strangers in interlocking stories taking place in ten different bars during the course of one evening throughout Los Angeles.

Girl Walks into a Bar premiered at The ArcLight Hollywood Cinemas on March 7, 2011, in Los Angeles and screened as an official selection of the Spotlight Premieres section at the South by Southwest Film Conference and Festival 2011 in Austin. The film is available in the United States to watch for free on Shangri-La Entertainment's YouTube channel, with each segment uploaded as an individual video due to YouTube restricting uploads to under 10 minutes at the time.

== Plot ==
An undercover ex-cop named Francine Driver (Carla Gugino), who poses as a hitman, meets a dentist – Nick (Zachary Quinto) – in a Los Angeles bar. Nick wants his wife Karen (Lauren Lee Smith) dead. He does not have the upfront payment of $20,000, but he promises he can get it for her before the night is over. When he leaves, Francine meets a young man named Henry (Aaron Tveit), a photographer who charms her before stealing her wallet and running off into the night. Her wallet contains the device used to record her conversation with Nick, and the evidence is incriminating.

This begins Francine's frantic search through the bars and clubs of Los Angeles. As she journeys, a number of characters are introduced. There is Henry's sister, Teresa (Emmanuelle Chriqui), an exotic dancer. There is Teresa and Henry's father, Dodge (Robert Forster), an ex-con who gives his son the most baffling of advice and has a strange fixation on bones. There is Nick's patient, Aldo (Danny DeVito), a gangster who can get Nick his money ... but only by roping him into participating in a heist. There is a bartender named Camilla (Amber Valletta), who is having relationship problems with her divorced upstairs neighbor. There is June (Rosario Dawson), a hatcheck girl for an exclusive nude ping pong club. There is Francine's superior, Sam Salazar (Josh Hartnett), who is always addressed as Officer but is actually a detective. Then there is Francine's ex-husband, Emmit (Gil Bellows), who has something Francine wants.

== Cast ==
- Carla Gugino as Francine Driver
- Emmanuelle Chriqui as Teresa
- Josh Hartnett as Sam Salazar
- Danny DeVito as Aldo
- Rosario Dawson as June
- Zachary Quinto as Nick
- Robert Forster as Dodge
- Aaron Tveit as Henry
- Amber Valletta as Camilla
- Gil Bellows as Emmit
- Kevin Zegers as Billy
- Alexis Bledel as Kim
- Michelle Ryan as Loretta
- Xander Berkeley as Moe
- Lauren Lee Smith as Karen

== Production ==
Girl Walks into a Bar is produced by Gutiérrez's Gato Negro Films and co-produced by Steve Bing's and Zach Schwartz's Shangri-La Entertainment. Principal photography took place in Los Angeles in March 2010. The film was shot in eleven days with a Canon 7D high-definition camera. Inspired by a scene from Gutiérrez's Elektra Luxx, it is a kind of Robert Altman-esque Short Cuts. Sebastián Gutiérrez claimed at the South by Southwest Film Festival premiere of Elektra Luxx that Girl Walks Into a Bar is the first major motion picture with a cast of notable stars created exclusively for Web distribution. Quoted in an official press release, Gutiérrez revealed "We want to prove that Web distribution is a viable medium for theatrical quality movies which rely on story, characters and dialogue as opposed to special effects. For many reasons the theatrical indie landscape has changed drastically in the last few years, leaving many potential breakout hits without an audience. We are excited to break the rules of feature films by letting people watch our movie for free online." Locomotive Distribution is handling worldwide sales.

== Release ==
Shangri-La Entertainment entered into an agreement with YouTube and Lexus to present Girl Walks into a Bar free, exclusively in the YouTube Screening Room, a platform designed to showcase top films from around the world, premiering March 11, 2011, and viewable only by visitors from the United States. The presentation marks the first time a major motion picture was created exclusively for Web distribution. "With Girl Walks into a Bar, the cast and crew came together to create something different – a high quality, really fun character-driven film that we could present to audiences for free using a new distribution model," said Gutierrez. "We found great partners in Lexus and YouTube to support the film while providing us with the stage to draw the largest audience possible." The film has since been removed, but it is still available to watch in 10 parts on Shangri-La Entertainment's YouTube channel.

Although it was intended for worldwide distribution, the film was blocked from the United Kingdom, Canada and the rest of the world on copyright grounds. In 2019 it was, however, noted that viewers in the UK could watch it on YouTube. Girl Walks into a Bar marks Lexus's first entry into film presentation. It was released on DVD on August 14, 2012.
