= Adrianne Palicki =

American actress and model (born 1983)

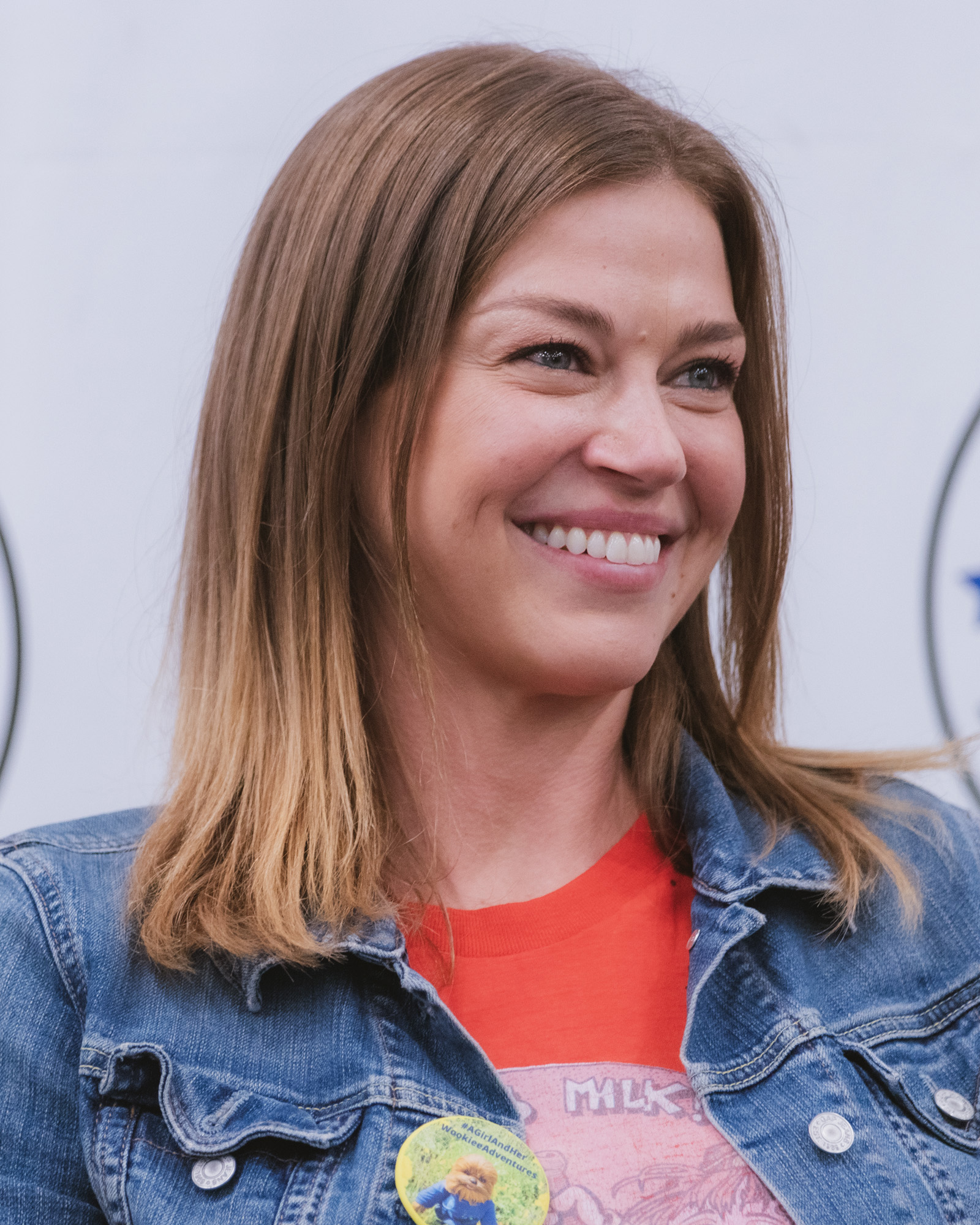
- Palicki in 2024
- Born: May 6, 1983 (age 43); Toledo, Ohio, U.S.
- Occupations: Actress; model
- Years active: 2003–present
- Spouse: Scott Grimes (m. 2019; div. 2020)

Adrianne Palicki (/pəˈliːki/ pə-LEE-kee) (born May 6, 1983) is an American actress and model. She is best known for her starring roles as Tyra Collette in the NBC sports drama series Friday Night Lights (2006–2011), as Bobbi Morse in the ABC superhero drama series Agents of S.H.I.E.L.D. (2014–2016), and as Commander Kelly Grayson in the Fox/Hulu science fiction comedy-drama series The Orville (2017–2022).

Palicki also had supporting roles in the films Legion (2010), Red Dawn (2012), G.I. Joe: Retaliation (2013), and John Wick (2014).

== Early life ==
Palicki was born in Toledo, Ohio, the daughter of Jeffrey Arthur and Nancy Lee (née French) Palicki. She has an older brother, Eric, a comic book writer who influenced her interest in comics.

== Career ==
Palicki appeared as Kara/Lindsay Harrison in the season 3 finale of Smallville in 2004. The same year she played Judy Robinson in John Woo's unsold pilot The Robinsons: Lost in Space. In 2005, she appeared in Supernatural as Jessica Moore, Sam Winchester's doomed girlfriend who is killed by a demon in its pilot episode. The character reappears in the Supernatural season 2 episode, "What Is and What Should Never Be", and the season 5 episode "Free to Be You and Me". In 2006, Palicki also appeared in The WB pilot Aquaman as the evil Nadia. The pilot was not picked up for series by The CW network, a result of The WB and UPN network merger, which occurred while the pilot was being filmed.

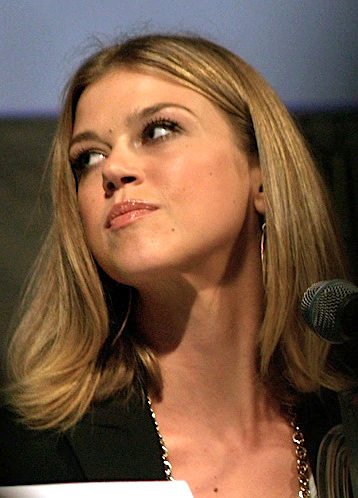
Palicki in 2009

Palicki was a series regular on the first three seasons of NBC's drama series Friday Night Lights from 2006 to 2009, portraying Tyra Collette. In early 2011, she returned for the final two episodes of the series.

She made an appearance in the will.i.am music video "We Are the Ones" in support of 2008 presidential hopeful Barack Obama. In 2010, Palicki joined the FOX television drama Lone Star, which was cancelled after two episodes, despite good reviews. In 2011, Palicki portrayed Wonder Woman in a television pilot produced by David E. Kelley for NBC. The pilot was not picked up to series. She played the recurring role of Dr. Samantha Lake in season one of the sitcom About a Boy in 2014, reuniting with Friday Night Lights showrunner Jason Katims.

Palicki starred in Legion (2010), and co-starred in G.I. Joe: Retaliation (2013) in the lead female role of Lady Jaye. She also appeared in supporting roles in Red Dawn (2012) and John Wick (2014). Although initially signed on to star in Jamie Babbit's 2012 horror film Breaking the Girls, due to production delays and scheduling conflicts, she does not appear in the film.

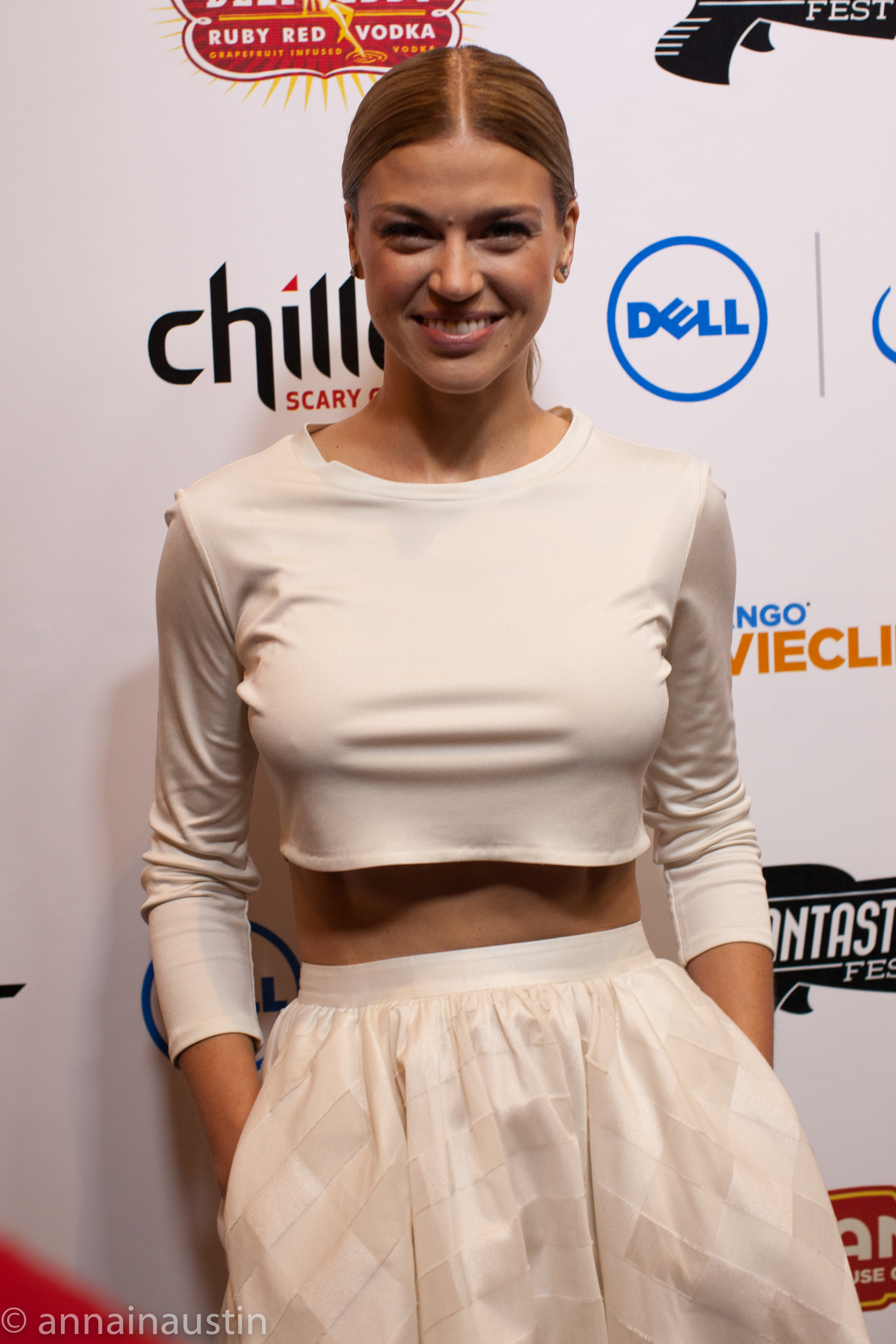
Palicki in 2014

In August 2014, Palicki joined Agents of S.H.I.E.L.D. in a recurring role as Bobbi Morse. She became one of the principal cast after the midseason break of season 2, continuing until her character was written out of the series near the end of season 3. ABC ordered a pilot episode for a spin-off, Marvel's Most Wanted, featuring her character in the lead role, but did not develop it as a series.

In July 2016, Palicki was cast as Kelly Grayson in The Orville, a science fiction comedy-drama series created by Seth MacFarlane, who also stars in it as Captain Mercer, her character's ex-husband. The series premiered on September 10, 2017, and two seasons have aired on FOX. A third season began in June 2022 on Hulu.

In 2016, Palicki and her brother, Eric, collaborated on writing their first comic book, titled No Angel, published by Black Mask Studios. The first issue was released November 30, 2016.

In 2023, Palicki starred in the Hulu Original film Quasi, released on April 20, 2023.

== Personal life ==
Palicki has celiac disease. In September 2014, her representative confirmed that she was engaged to stuntman Jackson Spidell, whom she met on the set of John Wick. At San Diego Comic-Con in 2018, it was revealed that she was dating The Orville co-star Scott Grimes. The two announced their engagement in January 2019 and married on May 19, 2019, in Austin, Texas. She filed for divorce two months later on July 22, 2019. In mid-November of that year, a judge granted Palicki's request to dismiss the filing. Palicki filed for divorce for the second time on July 16, 2020.

== Filmography ==
=== Film ===
Year	Film	Role	Director	Notes
2003	Rewrite	The Pretty Girl	Tom Lisowski	Short film
2003	Getting Rachel Back	Rachel	Tom Lisowski	Short film
2005	Popstar	Whitney Addison	Richard Gabai	
2006	Seven Mummies	Isabelle	Nick Quested	
2009	Women in Trouble	Holly Rocket	Sebastian Gutierrez	
2010	Legion	Charlie	Scott Stewart	
2010	Elektra Luxx	Holly Rocket	Sebastian Guiterrez	
2011	Waves	Girlfriend	Thor Gold	Short film
2012	Red Dawn	Toni Walsh	Dan Bradley	
2013	G.I. Joe: Retaliation	Jaye Burnett / Lady Jaye	Jon M. Chu	
2013	Coffee Town	Becca	Brad Copeland	
2014	Dr. Cabbie	Natalie Wilman	Jean-François Pouliot	
2014	John Wick	Ms. Perkins	Chad Stahelski	
2015	Baby, Baby, Baby	Sunny	Brian Klugman	Direct-to-video
2017	S.W.A.T.: Under Siege	Ellen Dwyer	Tony Giglio	Direct-to-video
2017	It's Supposed to be Easy	Kris	Keith Ewell	Short film
2021	With/In: Volume 2	TBA	Sebastian Gutierrez	segment: "Twenty Questions"
2023	Thoughts and Prayers	Senator Barnes	Evan Miller	Short film, also producer
2023	Quasi	Queen Catherine	Kevin Heffernan	Hulu exclusive
2024	Texas Cult House	Brittany	Julia Barnett	
2025	Due West	The Woman	Evan Miller	Also producer
2025	The Long Shot	Samantha Lambert	Austin Nichols	
2026	The Wolf and the Lamb	Liz	Michael Schilf	
TBA	Remote	Jules	Steven DeGennaro	

=== Television ===
Year	Title	Role	Notes
2004	Smallville	Kara, Lindsay Harrison	Episode: "Covenant"
2004	Quintuplets	Jessica Geiger	Episode: "Love, Lies and Lullabies"
2004	CSI: Crime Scene Investigation	Miranda	Episode: "Formalities"
2004	The Robinsons: Lost in Space	Judy Robinson	Unsold pilot
2005	North Shore	Lisa Ruddnick	2 episodes
2005–2009	Supernatural	Jessica Moore	Guest role (seasons 1-2, 5); 4 episodes
2006	South Beach	Brianna	8 episodes
2006	Aquaman	Nadia	Unsold pilot
2006–2011	Friday Night Lights	Tyra Collette	52 episodes
2007	Winter Tales	Mistletoe Girl	3 episodes
2007–2019	Robot Chicken	Various characters	Voice, 8 episodes
2008	Robot Chicken: Star Wars Episode II	Padmé Amidala, Jessica, Lexi	Voice, television special
2009	CSI: Miami	Marisa Dixon	Episode: "Dead on Arrival"
2009	Titan Maximum	Clare	Voice, 4 episodes
2010	Family Guy	Tiffani Thiessen	Voice, episode: "Big Man on Hippocampus"
2010	Lone Star	Cat Thatcher	5 episodes
2010	Robot Chicken: Star Wars Episode III	Padmé Amidala, Jessica, Woman	Voice, television special
2011	Criminal Minds	Sydney Manning	Episode: "The Thirteenth Step"
2011	Wonder Woman	Diana Prince / Diana Themyscira / Wonder Woman	Unsold pilot
2014	From Dusk till Dawn: The Series	Vanessa Styles	2 episodes
2014	Drunk History	Kate Warne	Episode: "Baltimore"
2014	About a Boy	Dr. Samantha Lake	10 episodes
2014	This Is Why You're Single	Maria	Television film
2014–2016	Agents of S.H.I.E.L.D.	Bobbi Morse	Main cast; 31 episodes
2015	Agents of S.H.I.E.L.D.: Double Agent	Herself	"Searching for Secrets"
2016	Marvel's Most Wanted	Bobbi Morse	Unsold pilot
2017–2022	The Orville	Commander Kelly Grayson	Main cast; 36 episodes Nominated – Saturn Award for Best Actress on Television (2017 and 2018/2019)
2024	A Christmas in New Hope	Shannon	Television film
2025	Doctor Odyssey	Dr. Brooke Lane	2 episodes

=== Music videos ===
Year	Title	Artist(s)	Role	Notes
2008	"We Are the Ones"	will.i.am	Herself	
2016	"Where's the Love?"	The Black Eyed Peas (featuring The World)	Herself	
