= Rise: Blood Hunter =

- Theatrical release poster
- Directed by: Sebastian Gutiérrez
- Written by: Sebastian Gutiérrez
- Produced by: Greg Shapiro
- Starring: Lucy Liu; Michael Chiklis; Carla Gugino; Margo Harshman
- Cinematography: John Toll
- Edited by: Lisa Bromwell; Robb Sullivan
- Music by: Nathan Barr
- Production companies: Ghost House Pictures; Mandate Pictures
- Distributed by: Destination Films; Samuel Goldwyn Films
- Release date: July 6, 2007
- Running time: 94 minutes (theatrical cut); 122 min (extended cut)
- Country: United States
- Language: English
- Box office: $2.8 million

Rise: Blood Hunter is a 2007 American action horror film written and directed by Sebastian Gutiérrez. The film, starring Lucy Liu and Michael Chiklis, is about a reporter (Liu) who wakes up in a morgue to discover she is now a vampire. She vows revenge against the vampire cult responsible for her situation and hunts them down one by one. Chiklis plays a haunted police detective whose daughter is victimized by the same group and seeks answers for her gruesome death.

The film was poorly received by critics. It was the final live-action film role for actor Mako, and was released nearly a year after his death.

== Plot ==
Reporter Sadie Blake has just published a notable article featuring a secret Gothic party scene. The night following the publication, one of Sadie's sources, Tricia Rawlins, is invited by her friend Kaitlyn to an isolated house in which such a party is to take place. Tricia is reluctant to enter with the curfew set by her strict father, so Kaitlyn goes in alone. When she does not return, Tricia becomes worried and enters the house as well. To her horror, she finds Kaitlyn in the basement with two vampires hanging onto her and drinking her blood. She tries to hide, but the vampires find her quickly.

The next day, Sadie learns of the girls' deaths and decides to investigate the matter. She soon attracts the interest of the vampire cult, and she is eventually kidnapped, raped and murdered by them. To her surprise, Sadie abruptly awakes inside the cold box of a morgue. She escapes, but in the course of the following hours she finds to her horror that she has turned into a vampire herself. After wandering the streets, she ends up in a homeless shelter, where she soon gives in to temptation, killing an old sick man and drinking his blood. She then runs out of the shelter when a young girl notices her, causing her to break down. She attempts suicide by throwing herself off a bridge, but is found and taken in by fellow vampire Arturo, who is less bloodthirsty and more benevolent than his brethren. Though his true motives are unclear — a power struggle between Arturo and the leader of Sadie's killers, Bishop, is mentioned — he helps Sadie to cope with her new condition and trains her to fight when she announces her intent to get revenge on her murderers.

Sadie tracks the vampires across the state, killing them one by one, while at the same time fighting the urge to consume blood from human victims. She soon crosses paths with Detective Clyde Rawlins, Tricia's father, who has taken it upon himself to avenge his daughter's death despite the objections of his superiors and colleagues. At first he takes Sadie for an enemy, but in time he recognizes that she is not of the same breed as Tricia's killers, and they team up in their pursuit of Bishop, the last survivor of the band. They track him to an abandoned stable complex, where they find not only Bishop but also Tricia, now a vampire, who openly voices her resentment and anger for her father. A hard fight ensues in which the evil vampires temporarily gain the upper hand. Along with two other women, Sadie is stripped naked and suspended by her ankles, with her wrists bound behind her back, to slowly drip blood. She is saved by Rawlins, and the two of them turn the tables against their enemies.

After Tricia and Bishop are killed, Sadie asks Rawlins to kill her too. She cannot bear the thought of having to give in to her bloodthirst and that she, since she is already dead, can never see her mother and sister again. Reluctantly, Rawlins grants her request and stabs her with a silver crossbow bolt. Once again, Sadie's body ends up in the morgue, but we see her come back to "life" again once more as the end credits begin to roll.

== Cast ==
- Lucy Liu as Sadie Blake
- Michael Chiklis as Detective Clyde Rawlins
- Carla Gugino as Eve
- James D'Arcy as Bishop
- Margo Harshman as Tricia Rawlins
- Robert Forster as Lloyd
- Mako Iwamatsu as Poe
- Allan Rich as Harrison
- Holt McCallany as Rourke
- Julio Oscar Mechoso as Arturo
- Samaire Armstrong as Jenny
- Elden Henson as Taylor
- Paul Cassell as Detective Easton
- Simon Rex as Hank
- Cameron Goodman as Kaitlyn
- Cameron Richardson as Colette / Frannie
- Marilyn Manson as The Bartender
- Nick Lachey as Dwayne

== Production ==
"This movie came to me because I like vampire movies; I just couldn't remember the last vampire movie that I really liked," offered Gutierrez. "I love the myth of the vampires which exists in every culture, but for me, the moment that there are fangs or garlic, it becomes really campy and no longer scary," he continued. "So the idea was really to do something sort of film noir-like with a female protagonist and introduce the concept of vampires into that. As a result, we have a movie that is basically a thriller about a cult—it happens to be a cult of vampires," Writer/Director Sebastian Gutierrez explained.

Lucy Liu immediately agreed to play the lead character of Sadie. She admitted: "I first read the script at 3:00am in the morning and so I understood the project from that perspective, what it needed and what the character was about. It wasn't strictly horror—it has an incredible emotional undercurrent, that and it had a thriller, noir quality about it." She continued, "I met Sebastian a couple of days later and we hit it off. It's hard to explain, but sometimes you just connect with things; this script and Sebastian were things that I connected with." Gutierrez stated it was not a film just about revenge, "Rise is a serial killer movie in which our protagonist is the serial killer, and we, the audience, want her to commit the killings. If it was just a straight revenge tale, it becomes more of an action movie—I am interested in the emotional moments." He added, "At the heart of the story there is this emotional core. It's very sad—Sadie's been killed. It's the worst thing that could possibly happen to you. She is trying to understand it, put an end to those that wronged her, and die again. There is this sense of dread, of the wrong that has already happened and you can't correct it—you just learn to understand it—or not." "Sadie has become something that she doesn't want to be and she struggles with that for the entire film and tries to do the right thing under those circumstances which you know is a pretty tough thing for her to go through." Liu continued, "Sadie wants to be alive again, but she can't have that. What is her option? What is her choice? She tries to kill herself — but no, that's not going to work, so she chooses this path. It's a story where people die for a reason." As 'Sadie,' a reporter who transforms herself into a killer once she realizes it's the only way she can avenge her murderers, Liu revealed, "She's a normal person that's caught up in this insane situation. She comes on really strong, and then as we watch the movie, we see that she's completely unraveled and must become a soldier and warrior."

Actor Michael Chiklis signed on to play her co-star: "He's different than any other cop that I've played; he's perhaps the most damaged—he's lost everything that mattered to him—his daughter—to these monsters. He's really hurting and damaged, and wants to exact revenge on those responsible for his daughter's death." Chiklis admitted: "My character is very much in a vigilante mode in this film. Yet in connecting with this girl 'Sadie,' there's this undercurrent of hope and even if he's beyond hope, as damaged as he is, he finds hope with her since she's even more damaged than him. Their mistrusting relationship turns into a strange partnership, to almost a relationship where there's this odd, for want of a better word, sort of love between them." Talking about the script, he remembered, "I really responded to the script, but meeting Sebastian was sort of the nail in the coffin as it were. He struck me as a guy who really loves the cinema and is knowledgeable about it. He really made me feel like he was going to make a very good picture." Chiklis, who had never appeared in a horror film, continued, "What really appealed to me is that the word 'vampire' is never used in the film. Sebastian made it clear that there was never going to be the biting of the neck shot—that conventional vampire movie thing. Instead, it's going to be something very unusual—what we're going for is a true noir—and that appealed to me greatly."

Actress Carla Gugino who plays the secondary villain is also Gutierrez's girlfriend and has starred in a range of his other films, admitted: "It's always exciting to be on any project where the director has a really strong vision. And with this movie, we have a phenomenal director of photography, John Toll, and an amazing group of actors, so there is a great level of collaboration." She also stated: "I think this is an incredibly entertaining movie. It's sexy, it's thrilling and there is also a lot of pathos. There's guilt and redemption—some very major issues in life are in this movie." When speaking of Academy Award-winning Cinematographer John Toll, Chiklis agreed: "John Toll is a legend. He's perhaps one of the best three cinematographers alive right now and certainly one of my favorites. I honestly wanted to work with him, too, so that just finished it for me—I was like 'I'm in!'" Chiklis added: "The appeal of a true noir is that the classic look is from the shadows. This movie isn't about special effects—this is about actors and cameras. This is about light and dark and creepy things in the shadows. Any artist that's in the film business loves films that are shot this way." British actor James D'Arcy, who was cast as the villainous leader of the cult, said: "I think it's a film noir that lives in this strange heightened reality. I hesitate to say that it's a horror film or a vampire film because I don't think it does justice what Sebastian has written. There's a much stronger undercurrent than those terms would suggest passing through the film. I'm hoping we're making that is emotional and very real." He complimented the director, saying: "Sebastian has done a fantastic job creating this world where he's avoiding as many of the clichés as possible. We never call anybody a vampire, there are no teeth, nobody sleeps in coffins."

Many actors and actresses had cameos in the film, including Robert Forster who appeared briefly at the very beginning of the movie, Cameron Richardson joined him in the scene, Samaire Armstrong appeared as Jenny, one of Bishop's victims, and Nick Lachey. Gutierrez commented: "Nick is very funny as Dwayne in this sort of endearing, not so bright, not the sharpest tool in the shed, kind of guy. "Another actor in a cameo is Goth icon, Marilyn Manson, who doesn't play a vampire as many of his fans first thought, but rather acts as a bartender. Manson said: "I thought it would be ironic to be in a vampire movie and not be a vampire." A film buff himself, he added: "When I read the script, I thought it was great. The genre is handled in a way that's clever and new." Gutierrez commented: "I think it was really fun for Manson to play somebody that is not one of the weirdoes of the movie—he's actually a regular guy. I'm not sure if his fans will recognize him since he's not in his full makeup, but he's playing a character and he's really good at playing a character." As for his look in the film, Manson revealed: "I had just finished my tour in Russia and had grown a beard, so when I called the production and told them, they were very excited because it would be something different. Plus, I wanted to be something different, not what people expect. I take off the lipstick, too."

== Reception ==
Rise: Blood Hunter premiered at the Tribeca Film Festival on April 28, 2007, and had limited theatrical release beginning on June 1, 2007.

The film was poorly received by critics. The film holds a 33% approval rating Rotten Tomatoes, based on 15 reviews with an average rating of 4.5 out of 10.

== See also ==
- Blade
- Vampire film
