= Carla Gugino =

American actress (born 1971)

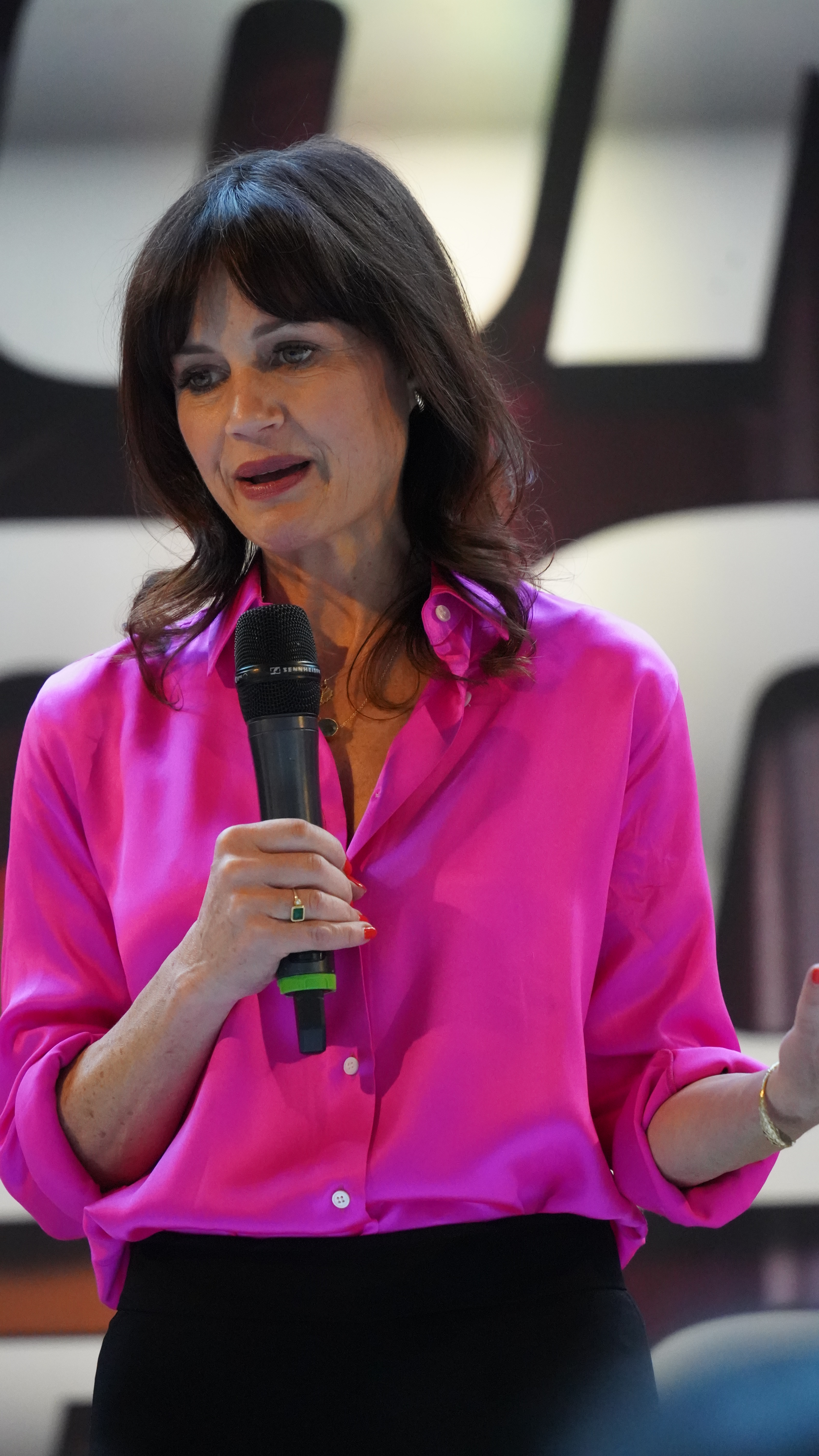
- Gugino in 2025
- Born: August 29, 1971 (age 55); Sarasota, Florida, U.S.
- Occupation: Actress
- Years active: 1988–present
- Partner: Sebastián Gutiérrez (1996–present)
- Relatives: Carol Merrill (aunt)

Carla Gugino (/ɡʊˈdʒiːnoʊ/ guu-JEE-noh; born August 29, 1971) is an American actress. After early roles in the films Troop Beverly Hills (1989), This Boy's Life (1993), Son in Law (1993), and Snake Eyes (1998), Gugino received wider recognition for her starring roles in the Spy Kids trilogy (2001–2003), Sin City (2005), Night at the Museum (2006), American Gangster (2007), Righteous Kill (2008), Race to Witch Mountain (2009), Sally Jupiter in Watchmen (2009), Sucker Punch (2011), Mr. Popper's Penguins (2011), San Andreas (2015), Gunpowder Milkshake (2021), and Lisa Frankenstein (2024).

In television, Gugino starred in the crime drama series Karen Sisco (2003), the science fiction series Threshold (2005–2006), and the crime drama series Jett (2019). She is a frequent collaborator of filmmaker Mike Flanagan, having starred in his supernatural horror miniseries The Haunting of Hill House (2018), The Haunting of Bly Manor (2020), and The Fall of the House of Usher (2023), as well as the psychological horror thriller film Gerald's Game (2017) and the upcoming supernatural horror The Exorcist: Martyrs (2027).

== Early life ==
Gugino was born on August 29, 1971, in Sarasota, Florida, to Carl Gugino (1928-2025), an orthodontist of Italian descent, and Susan (née Burgess), of English and Irish descent described as "Bohemian". After her parents separated when she was two, she traveled between the Sarasota home of her father and half-brother Carl Jr.'s, and the California home of her mother.

My father and my mother separated when I was two. With my father, I lived in (Sarasota) Florida, where we had a swimming pool, a tennis court, the whole deal. My mom wanted to take me out of the hubbub. She put up a real Indian tepee in Paradise, California, and we lived there for six months. We also lived in a van in Big Sur for a while.

She has said of her upbringing, "I lived in a tepee in northern California and a van in Big Sur. With my dad, I lived in a beautiful house with a swimming pool and a tennis court and went to Europe for the summers. So I feel like I lived two childhoods." She worked as a teenage fashion model, including work for the Elite agency, and took acting classes (with Gene Bua) at the suggestion of her aunt, former Let's Make a Deal show assistant and prize model Carol Merrill. She eventually came to support herself, and with her parents' approval, was legally emancipated by the time she was 16.

== Career ==
Gugino's television work during the late 1980s and early 1990s included appearances on Good Morning, Miss Bliss, Saved by the Bell, Who's the Boss?, ALF, Doogie Howser, M.D., The Wonder Years, Webster and a recurring role on Falcon Crest. In film, Gugino appeared in the Shelley Long film Troop Beverly Hills (1989), and she co-starred with Pauly Shore in the romantic comedy Son in Law (1993). Gugino made her stage debut in 1993 as Curly's wife in Geva Theatre's production of Of Mice and Men in Rochester, New York. She later recalled that the role earned her membership in the Actor's Equity Association. She appeared in the video to Bon Jovi's 1994 song "Always".

In 1995, Gugino appeared as Nan St. George (later the Duchess of Trevenick) with Greg Wise and James Frain in the BBC miniseries The Buccaneers, an adaptation of Edith Wharton's last novel. She played Ashley Schaeffer, Michael J. Fox's character's love interest, during the first season of the sitcom Spin City in 1996. She played opposite Nicolas Cage in Brian De Palma's Snake Eyes, and in Judas Kiss, which she also co-produced. She appeared as Dr. Gina Simon during the final season of the television medical drama Chicago Hope (1999–2000).

In 2001, she appeared as family matriarch Ingrid Cortez in the first Spy Kids film (as well as the film's two sequels in 2002 and 2003). That same year she appeared as Jet Li's love interest in the martial arts action thriller The One.

She starred in two short-lived TV series: ABC's Elmore Leonard crime drama Karen Sisco in 2003, and CBS' science fiction series Threshold in 2005. That same year, Gugino appeared as Lucille in the feature film adaptation of Frank Miller's graphic novel Sin City. The following year, she appeared in the film Night at the Museum as Ben Stiller's love interest.

Gugino made her Broadway debut in the Roundabout Theatre Company production of Arthur Miller's play, After the Fall opposite Peter Krause. In late 2006, she appeared in an Off-Broadway production of Tennessee Williams' Suddenly Last Summer opposite Blythe Danner.

Gugino appeared as Amanda, Vincent Chase's agent, in a dozen episodes of the cable television series Entourage. Gugino appeared in the May 2007 issue of Allure. That same year she appeared in the action-horror film Rise: Blood Hunter and the feature film American Gangster. The following year, she played the female lead in the thriller Righteous Kill, opposite Robert De Niro and Al Pacino.

In 2009, Gugino starred as Abby in Eugene O'Neill's Desire Under the Elms at the Goodman Theater in Chicago, Illinois. Charles Isherwood of The New York Times praised Gugino's performance, saying, "Ms. Gugino displays a depth and range of expression that I cannot imagine any other actress achieving with such blazing honesty and wrenching truth. She is simply magnificent." During the first three months of 2009, three feature films premiered featuring Gugino: the thriller The Unborn, the film Watchmen, in which she played Sally Jupiter, and the adventure remake Race to Witch Mountain, in which she starred opposite Dwayne Johnson. That April, she received an Outer Critics Circle Award nomination for Outstanding Actress in a Play for her performance in Desire Under the Elms. Later, in November of that year, she played a pornographic actress in the comedy film Women in Trouble, which spawned a sequel in 2010, Elektra Luxx, titled after her character.

In 2011, Gugino appeared as Madame Vera Gorsky in Zack Snyder's action-fantasy film Sucker Punch alongside Abbie Cornish and Emily Browning. Gugino sang a duet with co-star Oscar Isaac, which appeared in the end credits and in the film's soundtrack. She also guest starred on the fourth season of Californication as Abby Rhodes, Hank Moody's attorney and love interest.

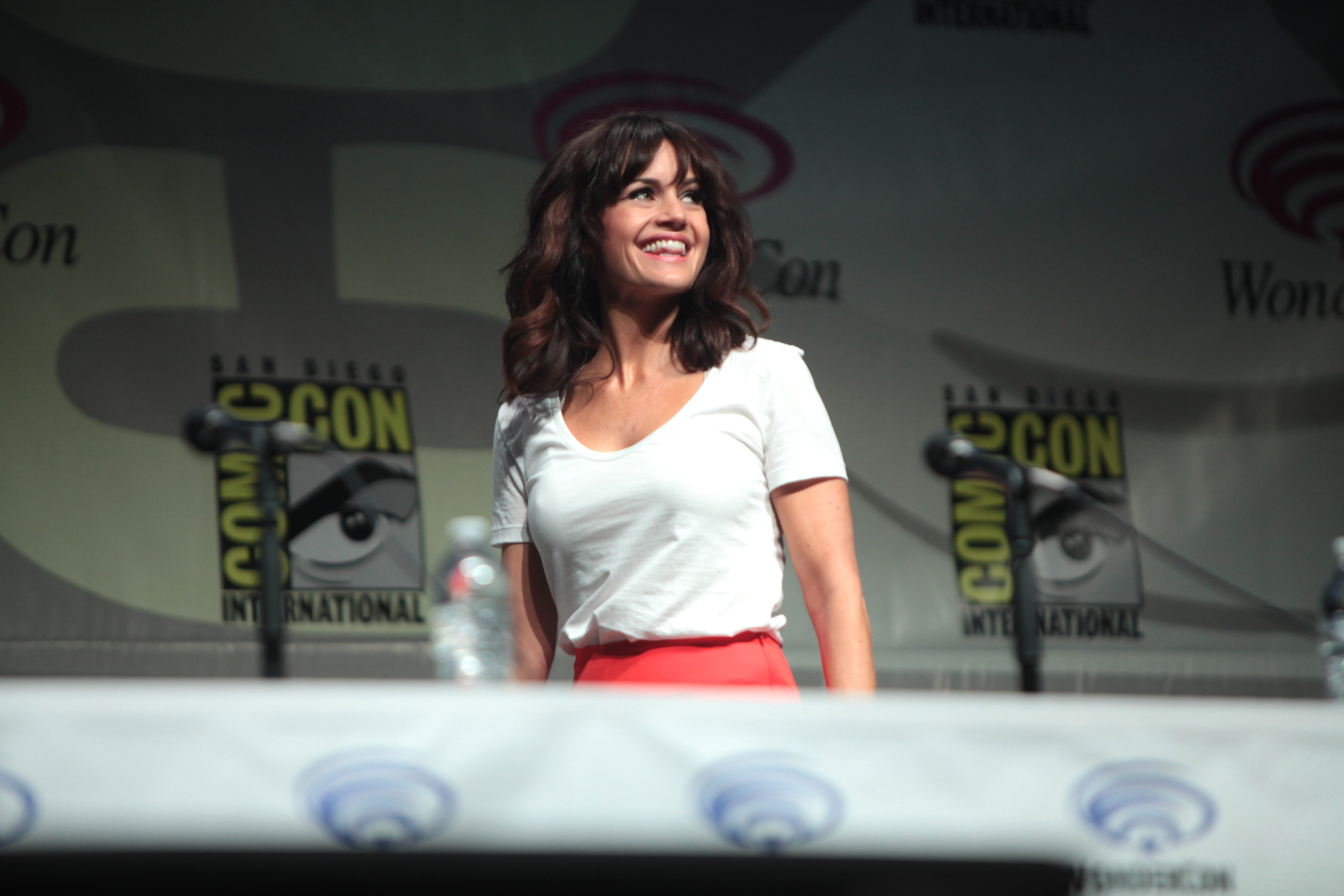
Gugino at WonderCon 2015

In 2012, Gugino had a lead role as Susan Berg, a Washington, D.C., investigative reporter, on the USA Network's miniseries Political Animals. In 2015, she had a lead role in the disaster film San Andreas, in which she once again starred opposite Dwayne Johnson.

In 2020, Gugino played Carol in Alice Birch's Anatomy of a Suicide at the Atlantic Theater Company.

== Personal life ==
In 1996, Gugino began a relationship with her collaborator, Sebastián Gutiérrez. Gugino stated in 2009 that they had no plans to marry: "Marriage isn't important for us. We like being boyfriend and girlfriend; there's something sexy and fun about that. We're very much about, 'There’s nothing holding us here other than our desire to be together.'"

== Filmography ==
Key
†	Denotes works that have not yet been released

=== Film ===
Year	Title	Role	Notes
1989	Troop Beverly Hills	Chica Barnfell	
1990	Welcome Home, Roxy Carmichael	Young Roxy	
1993	This Boy's Life	Norma	
1993	Red Hot	Valentina	
1993	Son in Law	Rebecca Warner	
1995	Miami Rhapsody	Leslie	
1996	Homeward Bound II: Lost in San Francisco	Delilah	Voice
1996	The War at Home	Melissa	
1996	Wedding Bell Blues	Violet	
1996	Michael	Bride	
1997	Lovelife	Amy	
1998	Jaded	Megan 'Meg' Harris	
1998	Snake Eyes	Julia Costello	
1998	Judas Kiss	Coco Chavez	
2001	Spy Kids	Ingrid Cortez	
2001	The Center of the World	Jerri	
2001	The Jimmy Show	Annie O'Brien	
2001	The One	T.K. / Massie Walsh	
2002	Spy Kids 2: The Island of Lost Dreams	Ingrid Cortez	
2003	The Singing Detective	Betty Dark / Hooker	
2003	Spy Kids 3-D: Game Over	Ingrid Cortez	
2005	The Life Coach	Carla	
2005	Sin City	Lucille	
2006	Even Money	Veronica	
2006	Night at the Museum	Rebecca	
2007	The Lookout	Janet	
2007	Rise: Blood Hunter	Eve	
2007	American Gangster	Laurie Roberts	
2008	Righteous Kill	Karen Corelli	
2009	The Unborn	Janet Beldon	
2009	Sparks	Robin	Short film
2009	Watchmen	Sally Jupiter / Silk Spectre	
2009	Race to Witch Mountain	Dr. Alex Friedman	
2009	The Mighty Macs	Cathy Rush	
2009	Women in Trouble	Elektra Luxx	
2009	Under the Hood	Sally Jupiter / Silk Spectre	Short film
2009	Apocrypha	Woman	Short film
2010	Elektra Luxx	Elektra Luxx / Celia	Credited as "Taryn Gugino"
2010	Tell-Tale	Femme Fatale	Short film
2010	Every Day	Robin	
2010	Faster	Cicero	
2011	I Melt with You	Officer Boyde	
2011	Girl Walks into a Bar	Francine Driver	
2011	Sucker Punch	Dr. Vera Gorski	
2011	Mr. Popper's Penguins	Amanda	
2011	New Year's Eve	Dr. Morriset	Segment: "Maternity Ward"
2012	Hotel Noir	Hanna Click	
2013	By Virtue Fall	Actress	
2013	Man of Steel	Kelor	Voice
2014	Match	Lisa Davis	
2015	San Andreas	Emma Gaines	
2016	Batman v Superman: Dawn of Justice	Ship	Voice
2016	Wolves	Jenny Keller	
2016	Bling	Catherine	Voice
2017	The Space Between Us	Kendra Wyndham	
2017	Gerald's Game	Jessie	
2018	Elizabeth Harvest	Claire	
2021	Zack Snyder's Justice League	Ship	Voice
2021	With/In: Volume 2	Writer	Segment: "20 Questions"
2021	Gunpowder Milkshake	Madeleine	
2024	Orion and the Dark	Orion's Mom	Voice
2024	Lisa Frankenstein	Janet Swallows	
2024	Veo Veo a Family	Sandra	Short film
2024	The Friend	Elaine	
2025	Heads of State	Elizabeth Kirk	
2026	Lockbox	Ellen Hershbergen	
2026	The Further Mis-Adventures of Cliff Booth	Toni Peters	
2027	The Exorcist: Martyrs †	TBA	Post-production
TBA	Vivien & the Florist †	Vivien Leigh	Post-production
TBA	Fog City †	Inez Brown Burns	Filming

=== Television ===
Year	Title	Role	Notes
1988	Webster	Heather	Episode: "Homecoming"
1988	Good Morning, Miss Bliss	Karen	Episode: "Summer Love"
1988	Who's the Boss?	Jane	Episode: "Prom Night II"
1989	ALF	Laura	Episode: "Standing in the Shadows of Love"
1989–1990	Falcon Crest	Sydney St. James	11 episodes
1990	American Dreamer	Young Jessica	Miniseries
1990	Ferris Bueller	Ann Peyson	Episode: "Stand-In Deliver"
1991	Doogie Howser, M.D.	Sara Newman	Episode: "Planet of the Dateless"
1991	The Wonder Years	Sandy	Episode: "Triangle"
1992	Quantum Leap	Michelle Temple Cutter	Episode: "Ghost Ship – August 13, 1956"
1992	Davis Rules	Kathi	2 episodes
1992	Murder Without Motive: The Edmund Perry Story	Allison Connors	Television film
1992	A Private Matter	Mary Beth	Television film
1994	Rebel Highway	Leann Morris	1 episode
1994	Motorcycle Gang	Leann Morris	Television film
1995	The Buccaneers	Nan St. George	Miniseries
1996, 1998	Spin City	Ashley Schaeffer	13 episodes
1999	Hotel Alexandria	Unknown	Miniseries
1999	Bonne Nuit	Carol Reeves	Television film
1999	A Season for Miracles	Emilie Thompson	Television film
1999–2000	Chicago Hope	Dr. Gina Simon	23 episodes
2001	She Creature	Lily	Television film
2003–2004	Karen Sisco	Karen Sisco	10 episodes
2005–2006	Threshold	Dr. Molly Anne Caffrey	13 episodes
2007–2010	Entourage	Amanda Daniels	12 episodes
2011	Californication	Abby Rhodes	10 episodes
2011	Hide	D.D. Warren	Television film
2012	Justified	A.D. Karen Goodall	Episode: "Cut Ties"
2012	Political Animals	Susan Berg	Miniseries
2012	New Girl	Emma	3 episodes
2015–2016	Wayward Pines	Kate Hewson	11 episodes
2015	The Brink	Joanne "Jo" Larson	Miniseries
2016	Roadies	Shelli Anderson	Miniseries
2017	Nashville	Virginia	Episode: "If Tomorrow Never Comes"
2018	Robot Chicken	Joyce Byers / Meg Altman	Voice, episode: "Mr. Mozzarella's Hamburger Skateboard Depot"
2018	The Haunting of Hill House	Olivia Crain	Miniseries
2019	Jett	Daisy "Jett" Kowalski	Miniseries
2020	Manhunt: Deadly Games	Kathy Scruggs	6 episodes
2020	The Haunting of Bly Manor	The Storyteller / Older Jamie	Miniseries
2021	Midnight Mass	Judge	Miniseries
2021	Leopard Skin	Alba Fontana	Miniseries
2023	The Fall of the House of Usher	Verna	Miniseries
2024	Rock Paper Scissors	Officer Wishowski	Episode: "Birthday Police"
2024	The Girls on the Bus	Grace Gordon Greene	Main role
2025	Big City Greens	Debbie Upton	Episode: "Charity Case"
2026	Carrie	Adult Caller	Episode: "First Period"

=== Music videos ===
Year	Title	Artist(s)	Role
1994	"Always"	Bon Jovi	Herself
2016	"Where's the Love?"	Black Eyed Peas (featuring The World)	Herself

== Accolades ==
In 2009, Gugino was honored by the National Italian American Foundation (NIAF). During the Foundation's 34th Anniversary Gala in Washington, D.C., she received NIAF's Special Achievement Award for Entertainment, presented by her close friend, actress Connie Britton.

Year	Award	Category	Work	Result
1999	Blockbuster Entertainment Awards	Favorite Supporting Actress – Suspense	Snake Eyes	Nominated
2005	Golden Schmoes Awards	Best T&A of the Year	Sin City	Nominated
2006	GoldDerby Awards	Best Ensemble Cast (with cast)	Sin City	Nominated
2007	Capri Hollywood International Film Festival Awards	Capri Italian American Award	—N/a	Won
2007	Online Film & Television Association Awards	Best Guest Actress in a Comedy Series	Entourage	Nominated
2008	Screen Actors Guild Awards	Outstanding Performance by a Cast in a Motion Picture	American Gangster	Nominated
2009	Scream Awards	Best Supporting Actress	Watchmen	Nominated
2011	Teen Choice Awards	Choice Movie Actress – Action	Faster	Nominated
2015	Los Angeles Independent Film Festival Awards	Best Actress	Tell-Tale	Nominated
2017	Fright Meter Awards	Best Actress	Gerald's Game	Won
2019	Saturn Awards	Best Actress in a Streaming Presentation	The Haunting of Hill House	Nominated
2024	Astra TV Awards	Best Actress in a Limited Series or Television Movie	The Fall of the House of Usher	Nominated
2024	Critics' Choice Television Awards	Best Actress in a Movie/Miniseries	The Fall of the House of Usher	Nominated
2024	Critics' Choice Super Awards	Best Actress in a Horror Series, Limited Series or Made-for-TV Movie	The Fall of the House of Usher	Nominated
2024	Critics' Choice Super Awards	Best Villain in a Series	The Fall of the House of Usher	Nominated
