= Hard Breakers =

- Directed by: Leah Sturgis
- Written by: Leah Sturgis; Elaine Fogg
- Starring: Sophie Monk; Cameron Richardson; Tom Arnold; Tia Carrere; Chris Kattan
- Distributed by: Freestyle Releasing
- Release date: May 20, 2011
- Running time: 98 minutes
- Country: United States
- Language: English

Hard Breakers is a 2011 American comedy film directed by Leah Sturgis and starring Sophie Monk, Cameron Richardson, Tom Arnold, Tia Carrere and Chris Kattan.

== Cast ==
- Cameron Richardson
- Sophie Monk
- Tia Carrere
- Tom Arnold
- Chris Kattan
- Mircea Monroe
- Alexis Arquette

== Release ==
The film was released in select theaters on May 20, 2011.

== Reception ==
The film has a 14% rating on Rotten Tomatoes. Paul Schrodt of Slant Magazine awarded the film two stars out of four.
