= Naked Eye (magazine) =

Naked Eye Magazine
- Frequency: Quarterly
- Publisher: Brand U Media
- Founded: 1999
- Final issue: 2010
- Country: Canada
- Based in: Montreal
- Language: English

Naked Eye Magazine was a Canadian entertainment and lifestyle publication distributed by Brand U Media on a quarterly, and then biannual basis. The magazine was published between 1999 and 2010 with interruptions.

== Overview ==
Naked Eye magazine's publicly stated primary mandate was to "celebrate Canadian culture by covering national talent with a global perspective". The magazine focused on both Canadian and international celebrities and trends.

The magazine originally launched in Montreal, Quebec, under XMMA promoter and publisher (and then editor) Burton Rice in 1999 but folded in under a year. It was relaunched as a quarterly in Fall 2007 then was published biannually for its last two issues in 2010.

The target reader group of the magazine was people aged between 18 and 35.

== Previously featured celebrities ==
Naked Eye had a policy of only featuring Canadians on its cover.

Originally, cover subjects were limited to actors and musicians, though towards the last issues this expanded to subjects including an ultimate fighter and a latex fetish model.

Fall 2007: Ryan Reynolds
Winter 2008: Pamela Anderson
Spring 2008: Feist
Summer 2008: The Kids in the Hall
Fall 2008: Emmanuelle Chriqui
Winter 2009: Rachelle Lefevre
Spring 2009: Bianca Beauchamp
Summer 2009: Georges St-Pierre
Fall 2009: Nelly Furtado
Issue #10: Lights (musician)
Issue #11: Malin Åkerman
