= Elizabeth Harvest =

2018 film directed by Sebastian Gutierrez

- Original theatrical poster
- Directed by: Sebastian Gutiérrez
- Written by: Sebastian Gutiérrez
- Based on: "Bluebeard" by Charles Perrault
- Produced by: Brian Kavanaugh-Jones; Leon Clarance; Fred Berger; Sebastian Gutiérrez
- Starring: Abbey Lee; Ciarán Hinds; Carla Gugino; Matthew Beard; Dylan Baker
- Cinematography: Cale Finot
- Edited by: Matt Mayer
- Music by: Rachel Zeffira
- Production companies: Automatik; Rep 12; Motion Picture Capital; Voltage Pictures
- Distributed by: IFC Films
- Release dates: March 10, 2018 (SXSW); August 10, 2018 (United States)
- Running time: 105 minutes
- Country: United States
- Language: English

Elizabeth Harvest is a 2018 American science fiction horror thriller film written and directed by Sebastian Gutiérrez and starring Abbey Lee, Ciarán Hinds, Carla Gugino, Matthew Beard, and Dylan Baker. The film follows a young woman who discovers that her new husband, a wealthy scientist, is hiding dark secrets. It is based on the French folktale "Bluebeard" by Charles Perrault.

The film premiered at South by Southwest on March 10, 2018, and was released in the United States on August 10, 2018.

== Plot ==
Elizabeth, a new bride, is brought home on her wedding day by her husband Dr. Henry Kellenberg. Henry's house is palatial and only two other people live there; the housekeeper Claire, and Henry's adult son Oliver, who is blind. Henry shows Elizabeth around the house, telling her that she can enter any room except one, which is located in the basement.

After Henry leaves for work each day, Elizabeth is left to her own devices. Initially her new clothing and jewellery, and the various luxuries provided by her new home are sufficient to entertain her. But eventually her curiosity gets the better of her and she explores the forbidden room, where she discovers clones of herself. She runs out of the room in a panic, leaving the door open. When Henry returns, he quickly discovers her deceit and brutally murders Elizabeth. Claire and Oliver help him to dispose of her corpse in a shallow grave in the grounds.

Six weeks later, another "Elizabeth" is traveling home with Henry after their wedding, exactly as before. The new Elizabeth goes through the same experiences, also discovering the room with the clones, except she manages to kill Henry before he can kill her. When Oliver and Claire find out what has happened and that Henry is dead, Claire has a heart attack and is taken to the hospital.

Oliver imprisons Elizabeth and asks her to read Claire's journal to him; he tells her that he will not release her until she does. The journal reveals that the original Elizabeth was Henry's wife, but she died of a rare medical condition. Unable to bear her loss, Henry decided to create clones of her, and hired Claire (a biologist) to help perfect them. The initial attempts were abortive, but eventually they succeeded. From the journal, it is learned that Henry and Claire have awoken six clones in total, including the current "Elizabeth" who is actually the fifth. The journal also reveals Claire's suspicions that Oliver is actually a clone of Henry, and that when she confronted Henry with this revelation he did not deny it.

When Elizabeth tells Oliver this, he states that Henry blinded him out of jealousy when he was a child, not liking Oliver's growing friendship with one of the other child clones, and after he had confronted Henry about molesting one of them.

Elizabeth attacks Oliver and tries to escape, but suddenly a new (sixth and final) clone appears, holding a shotgun. Confused and disoriented, the new clone shoots and kills Oliver. Elizabeth is also fatally wounded by the new clone, but before she dies she tells the clone to read Claire's journal.

The new (and final) Elizabeth reads the journal which tells how Henry and Claire initially met, and details their work together on the cloning experiments. They had a brief intimate relationship at this time, but later Claire discovered that Henry simply wished to relive his wedding night with each new cloned Elizabeth, prior to murdering them, which horrified Claire.

Recovered from her heart attack, Claire returns to the house from the hospital. The last Elizabeth clone gives her the journal, and tells Claire to put her research to better use. Then Elizabeth leaves to start life on her own.

== Cast ==
- Abbey Lee as Elizabeth
- Matthew Beard as Oliver
- Carla Gugino as Claire
- Ciarán Hinds as Henry
- Dylan Baker as Logan

== Production ==
=== Development ===
Writer-director Sebastian Gutiérrez had wanted to make a science fiction adaptation of the Charles Perrault's "Bluebeard" for around a decade prior to making the film, but struggled to find financing.

=== Casting ===
On casting Abbey Lee in the title role, Guitiérrez said: "If you have been a successful model, you have survived in an industry that is one of the few industries that are trickier for women than Hollywood. Abbey has all of that life experience, which is really helpful for this character, which is a character who both has to be sort of alien-like and yet desirable and sort of has this conked-on-the-head quality. Her fight or flight instincts are going to kick in and she’s going to show she’s a survivor, so Abbey was from the moment we sat down, really clear on how she would create subtle differences between the different versions of this person she was playing."

=== Filming ===
Filming of Elizabeth Harvest began in April 2017 in Colombia.

== Release ==
The film was given a limited theatrical release in the United States on August 10, 2018, by IFC Films, and was made available via video on demand the same day.

=== Home media ===
Shout! Factory released the film on Blu-ray on December 4, 2018.

== Reception ==
On the review aggregator website Rotten Tomatoes, 52% of 21 critics' reviews are positive. Metacritic, which uses a weighted average, assigned the film a score of 54 out of 100, based on 10 critics, indicating "mixed or average" reviews.

Joe Leydon of Variety praised the performances of Gugino and Lee. Frank Scheck of The Hollywood Reporter praised the film's visuals and cinematography, but felt its screenplay faltered after the first act, noting that "the storyline becomes so convoluted that it doesn’t live up to the intriguing setup. Most of the film’s second half is consumed by plodding exposition that is not exactly handled in imaginative fashion. That is unless you consider it imaginative for a principal character to be locked in a room and forced to read a journal that reveals all."

Reviewing for RogerEbert.com, Sheila O'Malley gave the movie two stars, criticizing the movie for its slow pace. Ben Kenigsberg of The New York Times wrote of the film: "Mr. Gutierrez keeps the viewer in the same state of confusion as Elizabeth, but each surprise, paradoxically, makes the movie less and less surprising as a whole. And Elizabeth Harvest is just stylish enough—from its elaborately patterned lighting and décor to suspense sequences staged in Brian De Palma-esque split screen—to make you wish a more sure-footed stylist had made it."
