= Shangri-La Entertainment =

American film production company

Shangri-La Entertainment LLC
- Type: Private
- Industry: Film
- Founded: 2000; 26 years ago
- Founder: Steve Bing; Adam Rifkin
- Defunct: 2020; 5 years ago
- Headquarters: Los Angeles, California, U.S.
- Parent: Shangri-La Business Group

Shangri-La Entertainment LLC was an American film production company established in 2000 by Steve Bing and Adam Rifkin, which was based in Los Angeles, California. It was owned by the Shangri-La Business Group, an organization with interests in property, construction, film, and music.

== Filmography ==
- Night at the Golden Eagle (2001)
- Without Charlie (2001)
- The Big Bounce (2004)
- The Polar Express (2004)
- Sierra Leone's Refugee All Stars (2005)
- Looking for Comedy in the Muslim World (2005)
- Neil Young: Heart of Gold (2006)
- For Your Consideration (2006)
- Beowulf (2007)
- Pete Seeger: The Power of Song (2007)
- CSNY/Déjà Vu (2008)
- Shine a Light (2008)
- Youth in Revolt (2009)
- Girl Walks into a Bar (2011)
- Marley (2012)
- Hotel Noir (2012)
- Rock the Kasbah (2015)
- Rules Don't Apply (2016)
- Kingsman: The Golden Circle (2017)
- Jerry Lee Lewis: Trouble in Mind (2022)
