= Emmanuelle Chriqui =

Canadian and American actress (born 1975)

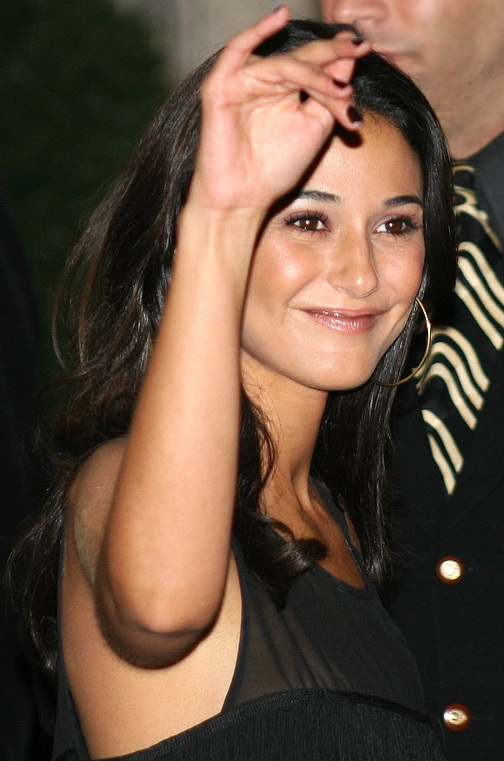
- Chriqui in 2008
- Born: Emmanuelle Sophie Anne Chriqui; 10 December 1975 (age 50); Montreal, Quebec, Canada
- Citizenship: Canada; U.S. (from 2017)
- Occupation: Actress
- Years active: 1986–present
- Partner: Sam Trammell (2020–present)

Emmanuelle Sophie Anne Chriqui (/ˈʃriːki/ SHREE-kee; born 10 December 1975) is a Canadian and American actress. She is known for playing Sloan McQuewick on HBO's Entourage (2004–11), Claire Bonner in Snow Day (2000), Dalia in You Don't Mess with the Zohan (2008), Lorelei Martins on CBS's The Mentalist (2013–15), and Lana Lang on The CW's Superman & Lois (2021–2024).

== Early life ==
Chriqui was born in Montreal, Quebec, the daughter of Moroccan Jewish parents. Her mother, Liliane, was born in Casablanca, and her father, Albert, in Rabat. Her family practiced Orthodox Judaism.

Chriqui has an older brother, Serge, and an older sister, Laurence. When she was almost two, her family moved to Toronto, Ontario. She grew up in Markham, Ontario, a suburb northeast of the city. Her mother, an aesthetician who once told Emmanuelle she would become an actress, died when Chriqui was sixteen years old.

When Chriqui was a child, her brother began paying for her to take acting classes. She attended the drama program at Unionville High School, after having studied in high school in Paris and having done two years of comedy studies at the Perimony school (Paris, France), she decided to pursue a career in acting.

== Career ==
Chriqui began acting while a 10-year-old in a McDonald's commercial. She moved to Vancouver in the mid-1990s, guest-starring in series such as Are You Afraid of the Dark?, Forever Knight, Once a Thief, and Psi Factor: Chronicles of the Paranormal. Her first Hollywood role was as a supporting character in Detroit Rock City (1999). She had a larger role in Chris Koch's teen comedy Snow Day (2000) portraying Claire Bonner, and then appeared in several other Hollywood films, such as 100 Girls, Wrong Turn, On the Line, and In the Mix. She played Eve in the 2005 comedy National Lampoon's Adam & Eve, and played Adam Sandler's love interest Dalia in the 2008 film You Don't Mess with the Zohan.

Chriqui was nominated for a Best Actress DVD Exclusive Award for her performance in 100 Girls and was nominated, with Lance Bass, for a Choice Liplock Teen Choice Award in On the Line. In April 2008, she won the Standout Performance Trophy at the Young Hollywood Awards.

Chriqui also starred in several music videos including Hinder's "Lips of an Angel", Zac Brown Band's "Whatever It Is", and Charles Perry's "I Could Be the Best Time of Your Life". She threw out the ceremonial first pitch at a Los Angeles Dodgers game on 8 June 2008. Chriqui was on the cover of the Autumn 2008 issue of Naked Eye.

She appeared in the 2008 film Cadillac Records as Revetta Chess, where she performed with Beyoncé Knowles. Chriqui was seen in 2009 as one of several women whose lives interconnect in the comedy Women in Trouble and appeared in its 2010 sequel Elektra Luxx.

From the second season to the end of the show's original run, Chriqui played Sloan McQuewick in the hit HBO series Entourage. She reprised the role for the 2015 film of the show. In 2010, Chriqui joined Showtime's series, The Borgias. She topped AskMen's "Most Desirable Women" list in the same year. She also voiced Cheetara in the ThunderCats 2011 animated series, and Numbers in the Activision video game Call of Duty: Black Ops. In 2019, she played Madison in the Netflix film The Knight Before Christmas, opposite Vanessa Hudgens.

In April 2020, Chriqui was cast as Lana Lang in the CW action-superhero series Superman & Lois, and also portrayed her Bizarro counterpart Lana-Rho in the second season.

== Personal life ==
In September 2017, Chriqui became a U.S. citizen. Chriqui practices Transcendental Meditation.

She has been in a relationship with actor Sam Trammell since 2020.

Following the 2023 Hamas-led attack on Israel, Chriqui denounced Hamas and declared that she would "stand with Israel today and always." On 12 October, she signed an open letter by Creative Community for Peace denouncing the attacks and calling for the return of kidnapped Israelis. On 14 February 2024, Chriqui signed another letter by the organization that criticized attempts to remove Israel from Eurovision 2024 due to the Gaza war.

Chriqui lights Shabbat candles each Friday night and has said that she arranges her contracts so that she does not work on Rosh Hashanah or Yom Kippur.

== Filmography ==
=== Film ===
Year	Title	Role	Notes
1995	The Donor	Patty	
1999	Detroit Rock City	Barbara	
2000	Snow Day	Claire Bonner	
2000	Ricky 6	Lee	
2000	100 Girls	Patty	
2001	On the Line	Abbey	
2003	Wrong Turn	Carly Numan	
2003	Rick	Duke's Long Suffering Wife	
2005	Candy Paint	Angela Martinez	Short film
2005	The Crow: Wicked Prayer	Lilly	
2005	Waiting...	Tyla	
2005	National Lampoon's Adam and Eve	Eve	
2005	In the Mix	Dolly Pacelli	
2006	Waltzing Anna	Nurse Jill	
2006	Deceipt	Emily	
2007	After Sex	Jordy	
2008	August	Morela Sterling	
2008	You Don't Mess with the Zohan	Dalia Hakbarah	
2008	Tortured	Becky	Direct-to-video
2008	Cadillac Records	Revetta Chess	
2009	Women in Trouble	Bambi	
2009	Saint John of Las Vegas	Tasty D Lite	
2009	Taking Chances	Lucy Shanks	
2009	Tom Cool	Chriqui	
2010	13	Aileen	
2010	Elektra Luxx	Bambi Lindberg	
2011	Girl Walks into a Bar	Teresa	
2011	5 Days of War	Tatia Meddevi	
2013	Three Night Stand	Robyn	
2014	Situation amoureuse: C'est complique	Vanessa	
2014	Fort Bliss	Alma	
2014	A Short History of Decay	Erika Bryce	
2015	Entourage	Sloan McQuewick	
2015	The Steps	Marla	
2015	Killing Jesus	Herodias	
2018	Omphalos	Alise Spiegelman	
2018	Super Troopers 2	Genevieve Aubois	
2018	Hospitality	Donna	
2019	The Knight Before Christmas	Madison	
2021	Die in a Gunfight	Barbie	
2022	Cosmic Dawn	Natalie	
2024	A Love Like This	Leah	Also producer
2025	Joy to the World	Joy Edwards	

=== Television ===
Year	Title	Role	Notes
1995	Kung Fu: The Legend Continues	Bumper	Episode: "The Return of Sing Ling"
1995	Harrison Bergeron	Jeannie	TV film
1995	Forever Knight	Jude Deshnell	Episode: "Black Buddha: Part 2"
1996	Traders	Samira	Episode: "The Natari Affair"
1996	Are You Afraid of the Dark?	Amanda	Episode: "The Tale of the Night Shift"
1997	Psi Factor	Melissa	Episode: "The Undead/The Stalker"
1997	Exhibit A: Secrets of Forensic Science	Rachel	Episode: "Sex Fiend"
1997	Unwed Father	Kayla	TV film
1997	The Adventures of Sinbad	Serendib	Episode: "Little Miss Magic"
1997–1998	Vampire Princess Miyu	Hisae Aoki	Voice, English dub
1998	Principal Takes a Holiday	Roxanne	TV film
1998	Shattered Hearts: A Moment of Truth Movie	Cindy	TV film
1998	Alien Abduction: Incident in Lake County	Renee	TV film
1998	Greener Fields	Megan	TV film
1998	Futuresport	Gina Gonzales	TV film
1998	Police Academy: The Series	Charlotte Ockleman	Episode: "Mr. I.Q."
2003	Jake 2.0	Theresa Carano	Episode: "Arms and the Girl"
2005	The O.C.	Jodie	2 episodes
2005	Unscripted	Emmanuelle	3 episodes
2005–2011	Entourage	Sloan McQuewick	Recurring role
2006	Deceit	Emily	TV film
2008–2009	Robot Chicken	Invisible Woman, Mokey Fraggle, Girl, Blackberry Pie, Check-Out Lady, Woman	Voice, 2 episodes
2011	Kick Buttowski: Suburban Daredevil	Kelly	Voice, episode: "Love Stinks!"
2011	The Borgias	Sancha of Aragon	3 episodes
2011–2012	Thundercats	Cheetara	Voice, main role
2012–2013	Tron: Uprising	Paige	Voice, main role
2012–2013	The Mentalist	Lorelei Martins	Recurring role
2013	The Ordained	Sam	TV film
2013–2014	Beware the Batman	Sapphire Stagg	Voice, 2 episodes
2013–2014	Cleaners	Veronica	Regular role; also executive producer
2014	Men at Work	Sasha	Episode: "I Take Thee, Gibbs"
2015	Killing Jesus	Herodias	Miniseries
2015	Murder in the First	Raphaelle 'Raffi' Veracruz	Main role
2016–2017	Shut Eye	Gina	Main role
2019	The Passage	Dr. Lila Kyle	Main role
2021–2024	Superman & Lois	Lana Lang, Lana-Rho	Main role
2026	Lincoln Lawyer	Jeanine Ferrigno	Season 4

=== Music videos ===
Year	Title	Artist(s)
2000	"Another Dumb Blonde"	Hoku
2006	"Lips of an Angel"	Hinder
2009	"Whatever It Is"	Zac Brown Band
2011	"I Could Be The Best Time of Your Life"	Charles Perry
2016	"Where's the Love"	The Black Eyed Peas featuring The World

=== Video games ===
Year	Title	Role	Notes
2010	Call of Duty: Black Ops	Numbers	Voice over and a short live action appearance
