= Hotel Noir =

- Directed by: Sebastian Gutiérrez
- Written by: Sebastian Gutiérrez
- Produced by: Steve Bing; Sebastian Gutiérrez; Zach Schwartz
- Starring: Rufus Sewell; Malin Akerman; Carla Gugino; Danny DeVito; Rosario Dawson; Kevin Connolly; Robert Forster; Mandy Moore
- Cinematography: Cale Finot
- Edited by: Lisa Bromwell; John Wesley Whitton
- Music by: Robin Hannibal; Mathieu Schreyer
- Production companies: Gato Negro Films; Shangri-La Entertainment
- Release date: October 9, 2012
- Running time: 97 minutes
- Country: United States
- Language: English

Hotel Noir is a 2012 American crime film written and directed by Sebastian Gutiérrez. The film stars Carla Gugino and Rufus Sewell. The film was shot in color and processed as black and white. It was released via video on demand on October 9, 2012 in the United States. In 2016, the film was re-released in color and retitled to City of Sin.

== Plot ==
Los Angeles, 1958: a detective holes up in a downtown hotel awaiting killers to come get him. During the course of one night he will meet various occupants of the hotel and the truth of how he came to be in his present situation will be revealed.

== Cast ==
- Rufus Sewell as Felix
- Malin Akerman as Swedish Mary
- Carla Gugino as Hanna Click
- Danny DeVito as Eugene Portland
- Rosario Dawson as Sevilla
- Kevin Connolly as Vance
- Robert Forster as Jim Logan
- Mandy Moore as Evangeline Lundy
- Michael B. Jordan as Leon

== Production ==
Hotel Noir "was filmed entirely inside the old Biltmore Hotel in downtown Los Angeles in 15 days for less than $300,000".

== Release ==
Through a Kickstarter campaign, the film received funding for an independently released theatrical run as well as through Video On Demand.

On 25 September 2012, the film had a Los Angeles County Museum of Art screening. On 27 September 2012, the film premiered in Los Angeles.

On 9 October 2012, it was released in the United States through Video On Demand services.

On 12 October 2012, the film screened at the Warsaw Film Festival in Poland, and received international home releases in Germany and Australia. On 12 October 2012, it opened at the Cinema Village in New York. Following this, the film received various runs in select cities nationwide through a partnership with Gathr Films.

In May 2012, Locomotive Entertainment (Colleen Seldin, Simon Barnes, Mili Cumic) offered Hotel Noir for international distribution during the 2012 Cannes Film Festival.

On 10 January 2013, Kickstarter backers for the film began receiving their exclusive DVD/BR releases. A limited-run soundtrack was also released.

In late 2016, the United States distribution rights to the film were picked up by Sony Pictures Home Entertainment, which re-released the film in color on January 3, 2017 under the title City of Sin.

== See also ==
- The Killers (Hemingway short story)
- The Killers (1946 film)
- The Killers (1956 film)
- The Killers (1964 film)
