= Gil Bellows =

Canadian actor (born 1967)

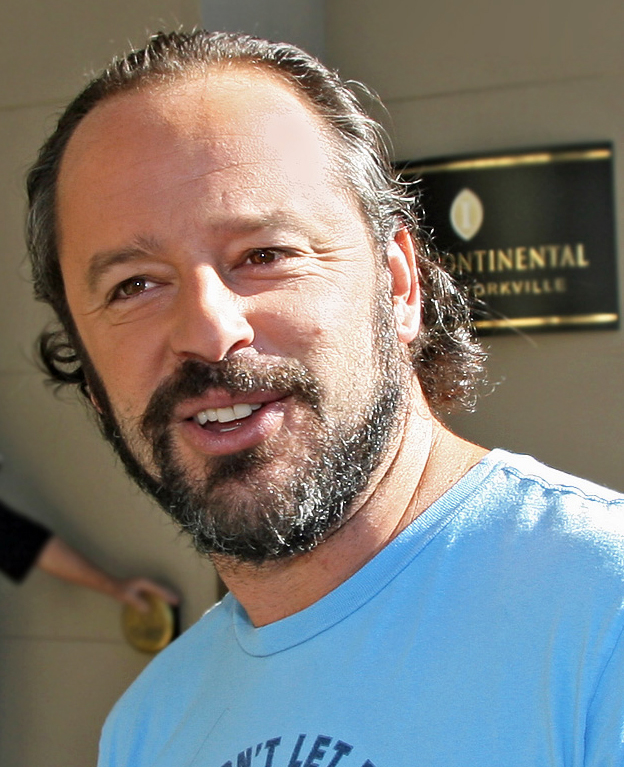
- Bellows at the 2008 Toronto International Film Festival
- Born: June 28, 1967 (age 59); Vancouver, British Columbia, Canada
- Occupation: Actor
- Years active: 1988–present
- Spouse: Rya Kihlstedt (m. 1994; div. 2023)
- Children: 2

Gil Bellows (born June 28, 1967) is a Canadian actor, producer, screenwriter, and director. Upon graduating from the American Academy of Dramatic Arts, he began acting in films and television. Bellows also earned critical acclaim for his stage performances in The Snake and the Vein (1990–1992), Flaubert's Latest (1992), and his first starring role in Love and a .45 (1994). Bellows gained widespread recognition for his pivotal role as Tommy in The Shawshank Redemption (1994). The film, nominated for seven Academy Awards, including Best Picture, is often regarded as one of the greatest ever made.

On television, Bellows is best known for playing Billy Thomas, the romantic lead in the popular Fox’s legal dramedy series Ally McBeal (1997–2002). His performance earned him a Screen Actors Guild Award, and when his character finally united with the title character, the show reached a record-breaking audience of nearly 17 million viewers.

Throughout his career Bellows has continued to work in both film and television. His film credits include The Weather Man (2005), House at the End of the Street (2012), and Scary Stories to Tell in the Dark (2019). On television, he has had recurring roles in Smallville (2010), American Gods (2021), Chucky (2023–2024), and more.

As a producer, Bellows has several notable accomplishments, including Mick Jackson’s HBO biographical drama Temple Grandin (2010), which earned him both a Primetime Emmy Award and a Peabody Award. He produced, starred in, co-wrote, and co-directed the film 3 Days in Havana (2013), and also produced the Amazon Prime Video series Patriot (2015–2017), where he received story credits as well.

== Early life ==
Bellows was born in Vancouver, British Columbia, and attended Magee Secondary School with fellow future actor Carrie-Anne Moss. After graduation, he pursued a career in acting, studying at the American Academy of Dramatic Arts in Los Angeles, California.

== Career ==
=== 1990–1994: Rise to prominence ===
Bellows moved to New York after graduating from the American Academy of Dramatic Arts in Los Angeles. Six months later, after many rejections, he was considering returning to Vancouver, British Columbia, when things picked up. In 1990, he earned notice for his performance in a one-act play by Alan Bowne, A Snake in the Vein, with The New York Times writing: "Mr. Bellows is physically magnetic as the boy who believes he is tougher than he is and whose sense of bravado is so pathetically susceptible to manipulation."

In 1989, Bellows acted in the film The First Season. Film critic Elizabeth Aird of The Vancouver Sun mentioned Bellows as one who stood out in the supporting cast.

In 1991, Bellows made his television debut in the Law & Order episode "The Violence of Summer".

In 1992, Bellows played a young gardener in the play Flaubert's Latest. Critic William A. Raily of The Jersey Journal applauded his performance. Also that year Bellows continued to receive good reviews for a A Snake in the Vein, The Daily News published "over-the-top performances (Charles Cragin and Gil Bellows), make for riveting albeit shocking drama." Also in that year he acted in an episode of Flying Blind.

In 1993, he acted in two episodes of Going to Extremes.

In 1994, Bellows played the pivotal role of Tommy in Frank Darabont's The Shawshank Redemption starring Tim Robbins and Morgan Freeman. After a long cross-country search, casting director Deborah Aquino chose Bellows, then 27, to play the role of Tommy, after Brad Pitt, who had been initially cast, withdrew because of a scheduling conflict caused by his sudden rise to fame. Aquino explained "We must have seen every young man in that age range in Chicago, New York and L.A. -- name actors and no-name actors." When he was cast, Bellows was working as a doorman. Director Frank Darabont said "Gil brought this quality of ingenuousness to Tommy that I find quite believable. Even though Tommy's kind of a hardened kid, there's a naïveté to him, and Gil's got a sweetness that comes through." Freeman was surprised that Bellows was a fairly new actor, and said he "relaxed right into it." Bellows said "I really wanted to play Tommy, and I was really hoping the audition wouldn't come down to a name criterion, or l wouldn't have had a hope." The film was nominated for seven Academy Awards including "Best Picture". It is often considered as one of greatest films of all time.

Also that year, he played his first lead role as Watty Watt, a holdup artist on the run in the indie crime drama Love and a .45 with Renée Zellweger. Of his character, Bellows said "I loved him from the moment I read the first page of the script, in spite of his profession, he is really a noble character. "I think he does know the difference between good and bad, right and wrong. By and large his justifications are those I would embrace in my own life - other than armed robbery." While the film received mixed to positive reviews, the quality of Bellows's acting was universally praised, Neil Davidson in the Red Deer Advocate wrote that Bellows played his role "to perfection."

=== 1995–2010: Subsequent success ===
In 1995, Bellows played one of the leads in J. S. Cardone's crime thriller Black Day Blue Night, alongside Michelle Forbes and Mia Sara. The reviews the film highlighted its strengths as a well-executed, low-budget noir with engaging performances. Greg Evans of Variety liked the film and of Bellows performance he said that it "outdistance the material." Also that year, he co-starred opposite Sarah Jessica Parker in the romantic comedy Miami Rhapsody directed by David Frankel. In his review of the film, Owen Gleiberman of Entertainment Weekly gave it an A− and wrote that "the cast is uniformly fetching." Finally in 1995, he played one of the leads in the television film The Silver Strand.

In 1996, Bellows acted in Daniel Sullivan's film adaptation of the stage play of The Substance of Fire. The film had an ensemble cast which included Ron Rifkin, Sarah Jessica Parker, Timothy Hutton, Tony Goldwyn, and more. Ella Taylor in her review for LA Weekly said of the cast that they were "so comfortable around one another that they breathe rich life into the often glib one-liners that are the hazard of theatrical dialogue." Also in 1996, Bellows appeared in Al Pacino's Looking for Richard. Of his appearance Bellows said "I have probably the smallest part, I was cast before Shawshank and I was a spearholder. But I got to sit in the loft and watch Al Pacino." Another role that year was in the television film Radiant City.

In 1997, Bellows played Billy Thomas, the former flame of the title character in Ally McBeal, opposite Calista Flockhart. Caryn James of The New York Times wrote of "the simmering heat” that he and Flockhart were able to generate. Of his character Bellows said "he's probably the most stable-acting of all the characters, but underneath I think he's the most tormented." The series was success for Fox Network. After two years, for the episode when the character of McBeal and Thomas finally unite the show reached a record number of viewership according to the Nielsen rating system of nearly 17 million viewers. On the success of the episode Bellows said "the relationship between Billy and Ally is a major component in the show. There are a lot of other characters on the show who can be considered flashier or more funny but I don't think there's a story line that's more compelling than Billy and Ally. I think their relationship anchors Ally as a human being as opposed to her character as a wacky figment of (producer David E.) Kelley's imagination. Billy allows her to explore human emotions that she probably wouldn't be exploring otherwise and I think everybody responds to romance in one way or another.” With the rest of the cast, he won and was nominated twice for "Outstanding Performance by an Ensemble in a Comedy Series" at the Screen Actors Guild Awards. During his tenure on the show he reprised his role in the spin-off series Ally (1999), and "Axe Murderer" a crossover episode with The Practice (1998). Bellows announced that he would be leaving the show in season 3, but would make guest appearances moving forward. Bellows explained that he felt "the show was starting to fall apart early in the third season" and that his character "started getting kooky. There were a lot of us -- and I loved working with that crew -- that found the script no longer made any sense." He spoke with the producer and the agreed that he "could leave in a way that suited the original spirit of the show, which was grounded with heart."

Also in 1997 Bellows acted in several movies these are Snow White: A Tale of Terror, Witch Way Love, The Assistant, White Lies, and Dinner at Fred's.

In 1998, Bellows acted in the films Judas Kiss, and Say You'll Be Mine.

In 2000, Bellows also appeared in the psychological thriller Chasing Sleep. Patrick Z. McGavin of the Chicago Tribune said that "Bellows does standout work as an intrepid detective." That year he also played roles in Beautiful Joe, and in the television film The Courage to Love.

In 2001, he portrayed CIA agent Matt Callan in the CBS primetime television series The Agency. At the end of the first season, Bellows was dissatisfied with the direction of the story,* and chose to leave the show after a mutual agreement with the producers. Without Bellows, The Agency was re-cast, but it was canceled by the end of the second season. Also in 2001, Bellows acted in one episode of Night Visions, and the made-for-TV film She Creature.

In 2002, Bellows played lead roles in the television films Whitewash: The Clarence Bradley Story, and Second String. On stage that year he participated to the 24-Hour Play event in which actors had 24 hours to write a play and perform it. The proceeds went to victims of the September 11 attacks.

In 2003, Bellows acted in the films Blind Horizon, and Fast Food High. On television he appeared in one episode of The Twilight Zone, and he had the lead in the television film 1st to Die.

In 2004, he appeared in the films EMR, Childstar, and Pursued. On television, he played roles in A Bear Named Winnie, Cooking Lessons, Zeyda and the Hitman, and one episode of Karen Sisco. On stage that year, Bellows took part in the Great Writers Series where actors read literary works of the American West on stage. His assignment was Walter Van Tilburg Clark's The Ox-Bow Incident.

2005 in films, Bellows played the lead in Keep Your Distance, co-produced Ali Selim's Sweet Land, and acted in Gore Verbinski's The Weather Man. On television he played one of the leads in the mini-series Terminal City. In it he plays the husband of a woman, played by Maria del Mar, diagnosed with breast cancer. Bellows believes that the part was "as good and complex a role as I ever had", on the part he said "it really spoke to me, I have children, I'm the grandson of a Holocaust survivor. These shows will get people to talk about the stuff that usually sits in the back of your head spinning before you go to sleep: What's going to happen if I lose you, or what happens if I go." Bellows explained that as they were shooting tragic moments "they're heavy scenes, and you're shaking, you're fighting the tears. You go outside and you'll see crew members in the same place, feeling the same way. One of them will talk about a spouse or relative." Alison Cunninghan in her praise of the mini-series in The Ottawa Citizen wrote "Bellows is exceptional. He turns in a stunning performance as a man who manages to anchor his family while he's close to imploding. Watching Bellows play such conflicting emotions, often within the same scene, is transfixing. His scenes with del Mar are gilded with the nuances and gestures that flourish between longtime friends and lovers." At the Gemini Awards, Bellows received a nomination for "Best Performance by an Actor in a Continuing Leading Dramatic Role".

In 2006, he acted in the television film Final Days of Planet Earth.

In 2008, he co-produced and played the lead in Kill Kill Faster Faster. Other films he acted in are The Promotion, Black Crescent Moon, Passchendaele, andToronto Stories. On television, Bellows also played a State Department Officer in 24: Redemption, a television film prequel to the seventh season of 24, he starred in the science-fiction film Infected, and one episode of The Cleaner.

In 2010, Bellows co-starred in the movie Unthinkable, A Night for Dying Tigers, and played the lead villain in Steve Austin's action film Hunt to Kill. On television that year, Bellows had a recurring role in FlashForward, True Justice, and appeared as Maxwell Lord on Smallville in the Season 9 episodes "Charade" and "Hostage". He also played roles in the television film Goblin, and one episode of Criminal Minds,

Also that year, as an executive producer, he released Mick Jackson’s HBO biographical drama Temple Grandin, which earned him both a Primetime Emmy Award for "Outstanding Made for Television Movie" and a Peabody Award. Bellows also received a nomination at the Producers Guild of America Awards for the "David L. Wolper Award for Outstanding Producer of Long-Form Television".

=== 2011–present: Current work ===
In 2011, he co-starred in the films The Year Dolly Parton Was My Mom, Girl Walks into a Bar, and The Maiden Danced to Death. On television he acted in two episodes of Sanctuary, and the television film Trading Christmas.

In 2012, he acted in Mark Tonderai's House at the End of the Street. The film went on to gross over $44 million worldwide. He also appeared in The Samaritan. On television, he had recurring roles in Boss and Vegas.

In 2013, Bellows acted in two episodes of the series Delete. He appeared in several motion pictures these are Mad Ship, Louis Cyr, and Parkland. He also co-directed, co-wrote, produced, and starred in 3 Days in Havana. Both the film and Bellows received a Leo Awards nomination for "Best Motion Picture".

In 2014, in films, Bellows acted in Extraterrestrial, Leading Lady, The Calling, and Kill the Messenger. On television, he acted in episodes of CSI: Crime Scene Investigation, Falling Skies, and Bones. He was part of the main cast in the miniseries Ascension, a retro space opera / murder mystery about the 600-person crew of the USS Ascension. Bellows plays a character who oversees its progress from a secret facility on Earth.

In 2015 he acted in the films Girl on the Edge, Weepah Way for Now, and Life on the Line. From 2015 to 2018, he had a recurring role as Lawrence Lacroix, on Patriot, the Amazon Prime Video series of which he was also the executive producer and received story credits. Critics praised the series as "dark, quirky, and often funny." Also filled with "moody pleasures will find themselves infiltrated by its scabrous humor and crackerjack dialogue."

In 2016, in films, he played roles in Dead Draw, and She Has a Name. On television he acted in two episodes of 11.22.63, portraying FBI agent James P. Hosty. Also that year, Bellows acted in the 10-episode mini-series police drama, Eyewitness. He plays Gabe Caldwell, a veterinarian and the husband of Sheriff Helen Torrance played by series lead Julianne Nicholson. David Wiegand of SFGate described it as "a competent procedural with well-drawn characters", and that Bellows and Nicholson gave "solid performances."

In 2017, Bellows acted in Blood Honey, and ADDicted.

In 2018, he acted in an episode of The Detectives.

In 2019, on television, Bellows guest-starred in episodes The Handmaid's Tale, Suits, and a recurring role in Jett. In films, he acted in Run This Town, Nation's Fire, and Drowning. He also had a major role in the André Øvredal's Scary Stories to Tell in the Dark. The film got many positive reviews. Clark Collis of Entertainment Weekly wrote that it was "blessed with some firm hands on the terror tiller and a winning cast, Scary Stories to Tell in the Dark is a handsome, and deliciously horrible, horror movie." It grossed $68.9 million in the United States and Canada, and $35.6 million in other territories, for a worldwide total of $104.5 million. For the film Business Ethics starring Larenz Tate, he played a role and served as an executive producer. The film won the Audience Choice Film Award at the 2019 Newark International Film Festival.

In 2020, he acted in episodes of The Twilight Zone, and Cherish the Day. He was in the main cast of the mini-series Love in the Time of Corona. Bellows also played the title role in Two Deaths of Henry Baker. At the 2020 Canadian Screen Awards he was nominated for "Best Lead Performer, TV Movie".

In 2021, Bellows appeared in several episodes of the series American Gods,, was part of the main cast of the mini-series V.C. Andrews' Landry Family, and the film Awake.

In 2022, Bellows played Gerald Chatham in the critically acclaimed mini-series Women of the Movement, based on the true story of Emmett Till.

In 2023, Bellows portrayed a recurring character in the third season of Chucky, a role he maintained until the series finale which aired in 2024.

In 2024, Bellows started playing a recurring character in season 2 of Alert: Missing Persons Unit.

== Personal life ==
Bellows was married to American actress Rya Kihlstedt, whom he met in the early 1990s. The couple have two adult children, a son and a daughter. The couple separated in 2021.

== Awards and nominations ==
Awards and nominations received by Ally McBeal
Award	Year	Category	Result	Ref.
Screen Actors Guild Awards	1998	Outstanding Performance by an Ensemble in a Comedy Series	Nominee	
Screen Actors Guild Awards	1999	Outstanding Performance by an Ensemble in a Comedy Series	Winner	
Screen Actors Guild Awards	2000	Outstanding Performance by an Ensemble in a Comedy Series	Nominee	
Gemini Awards	2006	Best Performance by an Actor in a Continuing Leading Dramatic Role	Nominee	
Peabody Award	2010		Winner	
Primetime Emmy Awards	2010	Outstanding Made for Television Movie	Winner	
Producers Guild of America Awards	2011	David L. Wolper Award for Outstanding Producer of Long-Form Television	Nominee	
Western Heritage Awards	2011	Film/Television, Television Feature Film	Winner	
Leo Awards	2014	Best Motion Picture	Nominee	
Canadian Screen Awards	2023	Best Lead Performer, TV Movie	Nominee	
