= Trading Christmas =

- Based on: Trading Christmas by Debbie Macomber
- Written by: Bruce Graham
- Directed by: Michael Scott
- Starring: Faith Ford; Tom Cavanagh; Gil Bellows; Gabrielle Miller; Emma Lahana; Andrew Francis
- Theme music composer: James Jandrisch
- Countries of origin: United States; Canada
- Original language: English

Production
- Producers: Harvey Kahn; Allen Lewis; Debbie Macomber; Caroline Moore; Michael Scott; Dan WIgutow
- Cinematography: Adam Sliwinski
- Editor: Alison Grace
- Production company: Trade Street Productions

Original release
- Network: Hallmark Channel
- Release: November 26, 2011

Trading Christmas is a 2011 Christmas film directed by Michael Scott and starring Faith Ford, Tom Cavanagh, Gil Bellows, Gabrielle Miller, Emma Lahana, and Andrew Francis. The film is based on the novel When Christmas Comes by author Debbie Macomber, who also serves as a producer. The film premiered on the Hallmark Channel on November 26, 2011.

== Plot ==
Three years after her husband's death, Emily Spengler, a 2nd grade teacher in the small Washington town of South Woodbourne, is preparing for the arrival of her daughter, Heather, who is a Boston College student. When Emily finds out that Heather wishes to do other things for Christmas, she calls her friend Faith Kerrigan, for advice. Faith is a divorced event planner based in San Francisco.

Meanwhile in Boston, Charles Johnson, an English professor and writer, is working on the finishing draft for his latest novel. Struggling to finish his book after missing several deadlines, his brother Ray, the owner of a software security company, suggests he go someplace to concentrate on his writing.

Meanwhile in Washington, Emily decides to surprise her daughter in Boston. Unfortunately, she is unaware that her daughter has already made plans to go with her boyfriend Jason, to Phoenix, Arizona, and stay at his grandparents' home.

Emily and Charles find each other on a house swapping website and trade houses for the week. He arrives in Washington to discover her home full of Christmas decor, despite his bad memories of Christmas. Emily arrives at Charles' in Boston only to discover her daughter had gone to Phoenix.

Meanwhile, Emily's friend Faith takes a plane and bus to surprise her in Washington, only to discover that Charles is there. As the next bus back to Seattle does not leave until Christmas, she stays at Emily's to Charles' dismay. Meanwhile in Boston, when Emily triggers the apartment alarm, Ray arrives with a police officer as Charles hadn't told him he had taken his advice. He offers to show Emily around and take her to dinner.

Over the course of the week Emily and Ray spend a lot of time together, revealing their past Christmas memories. In Washington, Charles struggles to finish his book, until Faith reads the draft, and makes suggestions. He is at first reluctant to take her advice, but eventually does, overcoming his writer's block to finish his novel.

Meanwhile in Arizona, Jason notices how homesick Heather is, so he buys plane tickets to Boston so she can spend Christmas with her mother. After Heather arrives in Boston, Ray gives Emily a pair of earrings as a Christmas present, and since Emily is leaving in a couple of days, decides it would be best to not make things more difficult.

On Christmas Day, Charles drives Faith to the bus station, only to stop the bus because he doesn't want her to spend Christmas on the bus. She is delighted and they kiss as the bus leaves without her. In Boston, Emily, Heather, and Jason arrive at Ray's apartment with a Christmas tree, and the four of them spend Christmas together. Emily learns that Ray finally sold his company, as he awaits the next chapter in his life.

One year passes, and it is revealed that Ray and Emily are married, living in South Woodbourne. They are visited for Christmas by Faith and Charles, who are also married and expecting a child, as well as Heather and Jason. The film ends with everyone celebrating Christmas together.

== Cast ==
- Faith Ford - Emily Spengler, a widow of 3 years and a 2nd grade teacher from South Woodbourne, Washington.
- Tom Cavanagh - Charles Johnson, a Boston College English professor and writer.
- Gil Bellows - Ray Johnson, Charles' brother, the owner of a software security company from Boston.
- Gabrielle Miller - Faith Kerrigan, a divorced event planner and Emily's best friend from San Francisco.
- Emma Lahana - Heather Spengler, Emily's daughter who attends Boston College.
- Andrew Francis - Jason, Heather's boyfriend who also attends Boston College.

== Reception ==
The New York Daily News said, "Measured against what Hallmark sets out to do, and against the heartwarming oasis Hallmark viewers expect, "Debbie Macomber's Trading Christmas" is just what the channel wants to place under our tree."

The Dove Foundation gave the "Dove Family Approved Seal to this film for ages 12 and up."

== See also ==
- List of Christmas films
