= She Creature =

2001 television film directed by Reno Wilson

- DVD cover
- Written by: Sebastian Gutierrez
- Directed by: Sebastian Gutierrez
- Starring: Rufus Sewell; Carla Gugino; Rya Kihlstedt; Jim Piddock; Reno Wilson; Mark Aiken
- Theme music composer: David Reynolds
- Country of origin: United States
- Original language: English

Production
- Producers: Lou Arkoff; Colleen Camp; Stan Winston
- Cinematography: Thomas L. Callaway
- Editor: Daniel Cahn
- Running time: 91 minutes
- Production companies: Columbia Tristar Home Video; Creature Features Productions, LLC.

Original release
- Network: Cinemax
- Release: October 4, 2001

She Creature (originally billed as Mermaid Chronicles Part 1: She Creature) is a 2001 made-for-television horror film, written and directed by Sebastian Gutierrez and starring Rufus Sewell, Carla Gugino and Rya Kihlstedt in leading roles. It is the first in a series of films made for Cinemax paying tribute to the films of American International Pictures. The films in this tribute series reused the titles of old American International Pictures films, in this case the 1956 film The She-Creature, but are not remakes of the earlier films. This film was shot in 18 days.

== Plot ==
In 1905 Ireland, two carnies, Angus Shaw and his infertile wife Lily, encounter a Mr. Woolrich during one of their shows. Having heard that a mermaid will be on show, he is relieved to find that it is just Lily impersonating one. They offer him a ride home, where he shows them documented sightings of merpeople and mermaids, explains that they can take human form during the full moon, and reveals to them an actual mermaid, who he captured back in his admiral days and who killed his wife. Woolrich warns Angus against using her as a freak show attraction.

Angus and his colleagues Bailey and Gifford break into Woolrich's home during the night but are caught. During the scuffle, Woolrich dies of a heart attack, allowing Angus and the crew to abduct the mermaid and smuggle her aboard their ship. Lily objects to this idea. During the voyage to America, the mermaid seems to take a liking to her.

One evening at sea, Lily is bothered by a drunken sailor, Miles, who was a client of hers during her time as a prostitute known as Mary Ann. At night, she suffers prophetic nightmares. The mermaid is found tangled in the ship's nets after she attempts to escape. As she is returned to her tank, she spits out Miles's ring, prompting Lily to realize that she killed and devoured him as a favor to her. She attempts to explain this to Angus, but he dismisses it. He admits that they abducted the mermaid rather than bought her and that they didn't mean to kill Woolrich.

The mermaid possesses Lily while she and Angus are making love, and Lily tries to kill him. Lily comes to her senses. Worried that the mermaid will do further harm, Lily attempts to free her, but is caught by Bailey who then is killed by the mermaid. Concerned for his wife's sanity, Angus locks her up in her room. Lily realizes she is pregnant, despite her infertility. She reads the late Mrs. Teresa Woolrich's diary, which confirms her worry that the mermaid grants fertility by possessing women during sexual intercourse. She escapes and encounters the terrified mermaid, now in human form due to the full moon. Lily comforts her, but they are caught by the crew just as she passes out. When she comes to, she explains to Angus that she is pregnant, but he dismisses this as a symptom of her sickness.

The crew angrily harass the mermaid before Angus intervenes. He and Gifford discuss the situation with Captain Dunn, who confesses that the mermaid made him do things against his will, then commits suicide. A storm closes in on them and they approach the mermaid's home, the Forbidden Islands. The crew realize that their captive took control of the ship and led them off course. The mermaid reveals her true monstrous form as the Queen of the Lair and her intention to feed the remaining crew to her people. The crew fight her but are all killed, though Lily is spared.

Two weeks later, Lily is rescued by the crew of a passing ship. Out of respect for the mermaid, she refuses to answer their questions. Lily lives peacefully with her daughter, whose eyes resemble those of the mermaid.

== Cast ==
- Rufus Sewell as Angus Shaw, an Irish traveling circus owner and conman who harbors a desire to use the mermaid as a freak show attraction.
- Carla Gugino as Lillian "Lily" Shaw, Angus' wife, who shares a psychic bond with the mermaid.
- Jim Piddock as Captain Dunn, owner of Marie Celeste ship.
- Reno Wilson as Bailey, Angus' Afro-Irish partner-in-crime; the mermaid's second victim.
- Mark Aiken as Gifford, Angus' other partner-in-crime.
- Fintan McKeown as Skelly, Captain Dunn's first mate.
- Aubrey Morris as Mr. Woolrich, an elderly retired marine commandant and the mermaid's initial owner; widower to Teresa Woolrich.
- Gil Bellows as Miles, one of the crew members; the mermaid's first victim.
- Rya Kihlstedt as the mermaid.
  - Hannah Sim as the Queen of the Lair, the mermaid's true monstrous form who intents to feed the entire crew to her congeners.
- Jon Sklaroff as Eddie, the Russian member of the crew.
- David Nott as the cook
- Dan Hildebrand as Christian
- Preston Maybank as the Navy Captain
- Brian Sieve as Officer Dixon
- Matthew Roseman as Officer Jenkins
- Gabriel Gutierrez as young O'Donnell
- Isabella Gutierrez as Miranda, Lily's human-mermaid hybrid daughter.

== Release ==
Released in the United States on October 4, 2001.

=== Home media ===
The film was released on DVD by Columbia Tristar both on January 1, and April 2, 2002. It was released by Lions Gate on April 18, 2006, as a part of a double-feature with another film in the series, The Day the World Ended. On June 1, 2010, it was released by Sony Pictures as a two-disk double-feature with Candy Stripers. Mill Creek released the film on February 25, 2014 and on June 7, 2016, as a part of two multi-feature movie packs.

== Reception ==
=== Critical reception ===
On review aggregator website Rotten Tomatoes the film has a score of 38% based on reviews from 8 critics, with an average rating of 4.7/10.

She Creature has received mixed reviews. Maitland McDonagh from TV Guide awarded the film 3/5 stars, calling it "surprisingly imaginative", commending the film's performances, creature design, and claustrophobic setting. Arrow in the Head gave the film a score of 7/10, opining that "The many astounding performances also contributed to make the fantastic premise even more engrossing... Add to that some solid special effects courtesy of Stan Winston Studios, gorgeous cinematography, a couple of intense scares, stylish directing and you get a very strong horror offering." David Nusair from ReelFilm Reviews awarded the film 1.5 out of 4 stars, calling it "cheesy". Nusair criticized the film's first hour as being "limp", writing, "all we really want out of this movie is a bad-ass mermaid killin' lots of folks. But we don't get that until the final 15 minutes."

== Awards ==
=== Winners ===
- Hollywood Makeup Artists and Hair Stylist Guild Award
  - Best Special Makeup Effects - Television Mini-Series/Movies of the Week : Myke Michaels, Richard Wetzel, Shane Mahan, Stephanie Coffey.

=== Nominees ===
- Fangoria Chainsaw Awards
  - Best Limited-Release/Direct-to-Video Film : She Creature.
  - Best Makeup/Creature FX : Stan Winston Studio
- Saturn Awards
  - Best Single Television Presentation : She Creature.

== See also ==
- The She-Creature
- The Last Voyage of the Demeter, a 2023 supernatural horror film with a similar plot.
- Mermaids in popular culture
