= Jett (TV series) =

American action crime drama television series

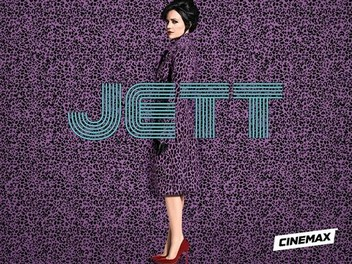
- Genre: Action; Crime drama
- Created by: Sebastian Gutierrez
- Written by: Sebastian Gutierrez
- Directed by: Sebastian Gutierrez
- Starring: Carla Gugino; Giancarlo Esposito; Elena Anaya; Michael Aronov; Gaite Jansen; Christopher Backus; Gil Bellows; Violet McGraw
- Composers: Johnny Klimek; Hans Hafner
- Country of origin: United States
- Original language: English
- No. of seasons: 1
- No. of episodes: 9

Production
- Executive producers: Sebastian Gutierrez; Carla Gugino; Mark Stern; Stuart Ford; Dana Brunetti
- Running time: 53 - 64 minutes
- Production companies: Fearless Media Group; Gato Negro Films

Original release
- Network: Cinemax
- Release: June 14 – August 9, 2019

Jett is an American action crime drama television series created by Sebastian Gutierrez. It stars Carla Gugino and premiered on June 14, 2019, on Cinemax. The drama ended with only 1 season and 9 episodes.

== Premise ==
Jett begins when "fresh out of prison, world-class thief Daisy "Jett" Kowalski is forced back into doing what she does best by dangerous and eccentric criminals determined to exploit her skills for their own ends."

== Cast and characters ==
=== Main ===
- Carla Gugino as Daisy "Jett" Kowalski, a skilled ex-thief.
- Giancarlo Esposito as Charlie Baudelaire, a cool-headed crime boss and Jett's associate/lover.
- Elena Anaya as Maria, a Spanish woman who helps raise Jett's daughter.
- Michael Aronov as Jack "Jackie" Dillon, an ex-criminal who is now a detective. He is also Jett's ex-husband.
- Gaite Jansen as Phoenix, a sweet-natured sex worker and friend of Jett.
- Gil Bellows as Evans, an employee of Miljan Bestic and ex-husband to Miljan's sister.
- Christopher Backus as Bennie, one of Charlie's henchmen.
- Gentry White as Charles Junior, Charlie's violent, unpredictable son.
- Jodie Turner-Smith as Josie Lambert, a detective who is Dillon's partner and his mistress.
- Violet McGraw as Alice, Jett's daughter.

=== Recurring ===
- Greg Bryk as Miljan Bestic, a Moldovan lawyer living in Cuba.
- Lucy Walters as Rosalie, a prison guard's wife who is kidnapped at Charlie Baudelaire's instructions.
- Mustafa Shakir as Rufus "Quinn" Quinton, Jett's ex-lover and a safe-cracker.
- David Aron Damane as Eddie McKay, Jett's old partner in crime
- Rainbow Francks as Carl, another of Charlie's henchmen.
- Shiloh Fernandez as Blair Howell, a former henchman to Frank Sweeney.
- Gregg Lowe as Robert "Bobby" Larcum, a real estate agent and Charles Junior's lover.
- Bruce Greenwood as Carlyle
- Gus Halper as Neal, Phoenix's half-brother.

== Episodes ==
No.	Title	Directed by	Written by	Original release date	US viewers (millions)
1	"Daisy"	Sebastian Gutierrez	Sebastian Gutierrez	June 14, 2019	0.120
2	"Charles Junior"	Sebastian Gutierrez	Sebastian Gutierrez	June 21, 2019	0.101
3	"Phoenix"	Sebastian Gutierrez	Sebastian Gutierrez	June 28, 2019	0.112
4	"Frank Sweeney"	Sebastian Gutierrez	Sebastian Gutierrez	July 5, 2019	0.125
5	"Bennie"	Sebastian Gutierrez	Sebastian Gutierrez	July 12, 2019	0.178
6	"Josie"	Sebastian Gutierrez	Sebastian Gutierrez	July 19, 2019	0.133
7	"Rosalie"	Sebastian Gutierrez	Sebastian Gutierrez	July 26, 2019	0.134
8	"Dillon"	Sebastian Gutierrez	Sebastian Gutierrez	August 2, 2019	0.109
9	"Miljan Bestic"	Sebastian Gutierrez	Sebastian Gutierrez	August 9, 2019	0.121

== Production ==
=== Development ===
On April 18, 2018, it was announced that Cinemax had given the production a straight-to-series order. The series was created by Sebastian Gutierrez who is also set to executive produce, write, and direct for the series. Other executive producers are set to include Mark Stern, Stuart Ford, and Dana Brunetti. Additionally, it was reported that Stacey Levin will serve as a co-executive producer and Kathy Landsberg as a line producer. Production companies involved with the series are expected to include Global Road Entertainment. On May 17, 2019, it was announced that the series will premiere on June 14, 2019.

On January 16, 2020, it was announced that Cinemax had ceased development of all original programming, and that the show was being shopped around to other networks for a potential second season. While there was no subsequent explicit announcement about Jett, by early 2021, Gugino and Gutierrez had started work on a different crime thriller for AGC Studios titled Leopard Skin which includes both White and Jansen in the cast.

=== Casting ===
Alongside the series order announcement, it was confirmed that Carla Gugino would star in the series as the titular character Jett. On June 19, 2018, it was announced that Giancarlo Esposito, Elena Anaya, Michael Aronov, Gaite Jansen, Christopher Backus, Gil Bellows, and Violet McGraw had been cast as series regulars and that Jodie Turner-Smith, Gentry White, Lucy Walters, and Mustafa Shakir were set for recurring roles. On August 29, 2018, it was reported that Chivonne Michelle had joined the cast in a recurring capacity.

=== Filming ===
Principal photography for the series began on June 11, 2018 and was scheduled to end November 16, 2018 in Toronto and Hamilton, Ontario, Canada.

== Critical response ==
On review aggregator Rotten Tomatoes, the series has an approval rating of 94% with an average rating of 7.5/10, based on 17 reviews. The website's critical consensus states, “Carla Gugino shines in JETT, a stylish – if overtly violent – noir that benefits from its willingness to crank its genre set-pieces up to eleven.” On Metacritic, it has a weighted average score of 65 out of 100, based on 4 critics, indicating “generally favorable reviews”.
