= Elektra Luxx =

2010 film by Sebastian Gutierrez

- Theatrical poster
- Directed by: Sebastian Gutierrez
- Written by: Sebastian Gutierrez
- Produced by: Sebastian Gutierrez
- Starring: Carla Gugino; Timothy Olyphant; Joseph Gordon-Levitt; Malin Åkerman; Adrianne Palicki; Emmanuelle Chriqui; Josh Brolin
- Cinematography: Cale Finot
- Edited by: Lisa Bromwell
- Production company: Gato Negro Films
- Distributed by: Myriad Pictures
- Release dates: March 14, 2010 (SXSW); March 11, 2011 (United States)
- Running time: 104 minutes
- Country: United States
- Language: English

Elektra Luxx is a 2010 comedy film produced, written and directed by Sebastian Gutierrez and starring Carla Gugino. The film is a sequel to the ensemble comedy Women in Trouble. The film premiered at the South by Southwest Film Festival in 2010, where it was acquired by Sony Pictures, and it was released to the rest of the country on March 11, 2011.

It was shown on UK TV on February 28, 2011.

== Plot ==
Pregnant porn star Elektra Luxx is trying to make a living teaching sex classes to housewives. But her life is thrown into disarray when a flight attendant with ties to Elektra's past approaches her for a favor. Chaos ensues as fiancés, private investigators, a twin sister and even the Virgin Mary force her to face up to an unexpected series of decisions and revelations in her life.

== Cast ==
- Carla Gugino as Elektra Luxx
- Timothy Olyphant as Dellwood Butterworth, private eye
- Joseph Gordon-Levitt as Bert (Roberto) Rodriguez, sex blogger, En Pelotas magazine
- Malin Åkerman as Trixie, checkout girl and friend of Bert's
- Adrianne Palicki as Holly Rocket, (former) adult film actress, Bambi's best friend
- Emmanuelle Chriqui as Bambi Lindberg, call girl, Holly's best friend / Lupita, Bambi's grandmother in Venezuela
- Emma Bell as Eleanore Linbrook, Elektra's neighbor & Rebecca's daughter
- Vincent Kartheiser as Jimmy, Eleanore's husband
- Marley Shelton as Cora, flight attendant
- Justin Kirk as Benjamin, Cora's fiancé
- Josh Brolin as Nick Chapel, (deceased) rock star
- Kathleen Quinlan as Mrs. Turner, one of Elektra's students / Rebecca Linbrook, writer
- Isabella Gutierrez as Charlotte, 13-year-old girl
- Amy Rosoff as Olive Rodriguez, Bert's sister
- Christine Lakin as Venus Azucar, porn star
- Melissa Ordway as Sabrina Capri, adult film actress
- Julianne Moore as the Virgin Mary (uncredited cameo)
- Rya Kihlstedt as Rita, barmaid from previous film (uncredited)
- Ermahn Ospina as Jimmy Cojones, adult film star
- Jake Hames as Thief #1, adult film actor
- Patrick Caberty as Thief #2, adult film actor
- Lucy Punch as Dolores, one of Elektra's students
- Susie Goliti as Maria, one of Elektra's students
- Matt Gerald as Michael Ortiz, man in restaurant with Bambi & Holly
- John Colella as George, man in restaurant with Bambi & Holly
- Gabriel Gutierrez as "The Walton Kid", Bert's cameraman in one scene
- Eric Stoltz as Dolores' fiancé (deleted scene)

== Sequel ==
Sebastian Gutierrez had planned a third installment tentatively titled Women in Ecstasy, which was to have featured Carla Gugino, Adrianne Palicki, Emmanuelle Chriqui, Joseph Gordon-Levitt, and several cast members returning from Women in Trouble.
