= Silver Strand (film) =

1995 film directed by George T. Miller

Silver Strand is a 1995 action/drama/romance film starring Nicollette Sheridan, Gil Bellows, Jennifer O'Neill, Jay O. Sanders, Tony Plana and Wolfgang Bodison. It was directed by George Miller and written by Douglas Day Stewart. The story follows Class 195 through United States Navy SEAL selection and training known as Basic Underwater Demolition/SEAL (BUD/S). Brian Del Piso (Gil Bellows) falls for the wife of his commanding officer, Lucas Hughes (Jay O. Sanders). Michelle Hughes (Nicollette Sheridan) was a Navy brat and is now Lucas wife.
