= Judas Kiss (1998 film) =

1998 film by Sebastian Gutierrez

- Theatrical release poster
- Directed by: Sebastian Gutierrez
- Written by: Sebastian Gutierrez; Deanna Fuller
- Produced by: Elaine Dysinger; Carla Gugino; Beau Flynn; Daniel Rappaport
- Starring: Simon Baker-Denny; Gil Bellows; Carla Gugino; Alan Rickman; Til Schweiger; Emma Thompson; Hal Holbrook
- Cinematography: James Chressanthis
- Edited by: Howard Smith
- Music by: Christopher Young
- Distributed by: Bandeira Entertainment
- Release date: September 16, 1998 (Toronto)
- Running time: 98 minutes
- Country: United States
- Language: English
- Budget: $4.5 million

Judas Kiss is a 1998 American crime thriller film co-written and directed by Sebastian Gutierrez, starring Alan Rickman, Emma Thompson, Roscoe Lee Browne, Carla Gugino, Simon Baker-Denny, Gil Bellows, Richard Riehle, and Til Schweiger.

The film premiered at the 1998 Toronto International Film Festival and won the Critics Award at the 1999 Cognac Festival du Film Policier.

== Plot ==
Coco Chavez and Junior Armstrong are two small-time criminals who make money at blackmail and sex scams. They attempt to break into the big time by kidnapping a computer genius and holding him for a $4 million ransom. To help them, they enlist Lizard Browning and Ruben Rubenbauer who provide firepower and technology. However, during the kidnapping, they accidentally kill the wife of Louisiana Senator Hornbeck.

Racked by guilt, Coco and the group are pursued by veteran Federal Bureau of Investigation agent Sadie Hawkins and grizzled New Orleans detective David Friedman. The two combative officers enjoy showing up one another during their investigation, as well as commiserating about their jobs and personal foibles. Coco and Junior also have to deal with henchmen hired by the Senator to get revenge on the group.

As the plot unfolds, it appears that the murder may not have been entirely accidental. Detective Friedman's suspicions are raised when Senator Hornbeck threatens the detectives instead of offering assistance. On the cusp of getting away with a nearly flawless crime, the group faces betrayal from within.

== Cast ==
- Alan Rickman as Detective David Friedman
- Emma Thompson as FBI Agent Sadie Hawkins
- Roscoe Lee Browne as Chief Bleeker
- Carla Gugino as Coco Chavez
- Gil Bellows as Lizard Browning
- Simon Baker-Denny as Junior Armstrong
- Til Schweiger as Ruben Rubenbauer
- Richard Riehle as Security Guard
- Philip Baker Hall as Pobby Malavero
- Hal Holbrook as Senator Rupert Hornbeck
- Joey Slotnick as Walters
- Jack Conley as Detective Matty Grimes
- Lisa Eichhorn as Mary Ellen Floyd

== Production ==
The movie was produced by Bandeira Entertainment. The movie was filmed in Los Angeles, California and on location in New Orleans, Louisiana.

== Reception ==
On review aggregator website Rotten Tomatoes, the film holds an approval rating of 43% based on 7 reviews, with an average rating of 5.92/10.

Michael Dequina from Movie Report.com said, "The usual set of twists and double-crosses ensue, with nothing all-too-surprising (or funny; the attempts at humor mostly fall flat) to distinguish it from the winding paths of other similar films".

Derek Elley of Variety wrote "Judas Kiss is a wannabe film noir-cum-policier that's badly in need of a rewrite by James Ellroy".

== Awards and nominations ==
Cognac Festival du Film Policier

- Won: Critics Award (Sebastian Gutierrez)

Paris Film Festival

- Nominated: Grand Prix (Sebastian Gutierrez)

== Home video ==
The movie was distributed to home video on both VHS and DVD formats on September 21, 1999 by Sony Pictures. Both home video formats have a runtime of 98 minutes.
