= Women in Trouble =

2009 film by Sebastian Gutierrez

- Theatrical release poster
- Directed by: Sebastian Gutierrez
- Written by: Sebastian Gutierrez
- Produced by: Sebastian Gutierrez
- Starring: Simon Baker; Garcelle Beauvais-Nilon; Connie Britton; Josh Brolin; Emmanuelle Chriqui; Sarah Clarke; Joseph Gordon-Levitt; Carla Gugino; Caitlin Keats; Rya Kihlstedt; Adrianne Palicki; Cameron Richardson; Marley Shelton; Isabella Gutierrez
- Cinematography: Cale Finot
- Edited by: Lisa Bromwell; Michelle Tesoro
- Music by: Robyn Hitchcock
- Production company: Gato Negro Films
- Distributed by: Screen Media Films
- Release dates: March 15, 2009 (SXSW); November 13, 2009 (United States)
- Running time: 92 minutes
- Country: United States
- Language: English
- Budget: $50,000
- Box office: $18,000

Women in Trouble is a 2009 American sex comedy film written, produced, and directed by Sebastian Gutierrez and starring Carla Gugino, Connie Britton, Emmanuelle Chriqui, Marley Shelton, Adrianne Palicki, Simon Baker, and Josh Brolin. It was shot in 10 days for $50,000.

== Plot ==
The film focuses on six women in Los Angeles as their lives become intertwined in the course of 24 hours.

After learning that she is pregnant, porn star Elektra Luxx gets stuck in an elevator with Doris, sister to Addy. Addy has recently started taking her daughter (who is actually the biological daughter of Doris but due to drug abuse and Doris' at the time abusive boyfriend, she was raised by Addy) Charlotte, to see her therapist, Maxine, while secretly using the visits to sleep with Maxine's husband. Upon learning about the affair during a therapy session with Charlotte, Maxine rushes out and gets into her car. While backing out, she hits porn star Holly Rocket, a colleague of Elektra Luxx who had been fleeing with her friend, Bambi, from a job that had gone wrong. Meanwhile, flight attendant Cora finds herself the object of rock star Nick Chapel's affection on a flight to his band's upcoming show.

== Cast ==
- Carla Gugino as Elektra Luxx, an adult film superstar
- Adrianne Palicki as Holly Rocket, an adult film actress
- Connie Britton as Doris, Addy's sister
- Caitlin Keats as Addy Hunter, Doris' sister
- Isabella Gutierrez as Charlotte, Doris' 13-year-old daughter
- Marley Shelton as Cora, a flight attendant
- Garcelle Beauvais-Nilon as Maggie, a flight attendant
- Josh Brolin as Nick Chapel, a rock star who is a passenger on the airplane
- Emmanuelle Chriqui as Bambi, a call girl
- Rya Kihlstedt as Rita, a barmaid at Ruby's Caribbean, the lesbian bar, and Darby's roommate
- Cameron Richardson as Darby, a masseuse and Rita's roommate
- Sarah Clarke as Maxine McPherson, a therapist
- Simon Baker as Travis McPherson, Maxine's husband
- Xander Berkeley as Mr. Frost, one of the people talking to the therapist
- Elizabeth Berkley as Tracy, one of the people talking to the therapist
- Lauren Katz as Tara, one of the people talking to the therapist
- Paul Cassell as a Jay, one of the people talking to the therapist
- Ermahn Ospina as El Capitan, a character in the porn film
- Greg Lauren as fireman
- Samantha Shelton as singer at Ruby's Caribbean
- Antonio Graña as Jimbo, the mafioso muscle
- Joseph Gordon-Levitt as Bert Rodriguez, a "sex blogger"

== Production and sequel ==
The film was directed by Sebastian Gutierrez. Production began and ended in Los Angeles. The film premiered at the 2009 South by Southwest Film Festival. The film opened in the United States on November 13, 2009. A sequel, Elektra Luxx, was released on March 11, 2011. Gutierrez returns as the writer–director, and the cast includes Carla Gugino, Joseph Gordon-Levitt, Timothy Olyphant, Julianne Moore, and Justin Kirk. Gutierrez is planning on making a third installment, tentatively titled Women in Ecstasy, which was initially planned to be released in 2012.

== Critical reception ==
Women in Trouble polarized critics. On the review aggregator website Rotten Tomatoes, the film holds an approval rating of 29% based on 24 reviews, with an average rating of 4.2/10. The website's critics consensus reads, "Sebastian Gutierrez certainly has an eye for the beauty of the female form, but Women in Trouble lacks a compelling script or point of view to go with its curvaceous visual appeal." Metacritic, which uses a weighted average, assigned the film a score of 43 out of 100, based on 9 critics, indicating "mixed or average" reviews.

On the positive side, Joe Leydon of Variety gave it a rave review, calling it "[a] compulsively watchable mix of high camp and grand passions, soap opera and softcore sex. Very much in the deliriously lewd style of Pedro Almodóvar—who has co-written unproduced scripts with Gutierrez, and gets a shout-out in the closing credits—this exuberantly uninhibited indie has the anything-goes spirit of something tossed off in a single burst of collaborative energy". Kevin Thomas of the Los Angeles Times assessed, "Women in Trouble has sleeper written all over it and a sequel is already in the works". John DeFore writing for The Hollywood Reporter praised the direction: "Gutierrez's script can not supply female characters as believable as Almodovar's, but in the director's chair he gives his cast room to compensate with funny, self-aware performances".

At the other end of the spectrum, Melissa Anderson writing for The Village Voice said that "blue material mixes awkwardly with sob stories". Manohla Dargis of The New York Times was not amused, complaining that "[t]he amateurish production values might be pardoned if the clichés—the hard-core porn star with the soft heart, the therapist who needs to heal herself—inside the poorly lighted, badly shot images weren't so absurd and often insulting." Matthew Connolly of Slant Magazine gave it 1.5 out of 4 stars and said "At a particularly rundown corner of Almodóvar Boulevard and Tarantino Lane, you’ll find Women in Trouble".
