= Gerald Chatham =

American lawyer (1906-1956)

- Born: February 17, 1906; Hernando, Mississippi, U.S.
- Died: October 9, 1956 (aged 50); Sumner, Mississippi

Gerald Weissinger Chatham (February 17, 1906 – October 9, 1956) was an American lawyer, best known for acting as lead prosecutor in the Emmett Till case in 1955.

== Biography ==
Chatham was born in Hernando, Mississippi in 1906. He attended the University of Mississippi for both his undergraduate and law degrees. At the age of 35, he became District Attorney of Tallahatchie County and would hold that station until 1955, the year that he prosecuted J.W. Milam and Roy Bryant for the murder of Emmett Till. Chatham's family claims that the pressures of the trial harmed his health and ultimately led to a fatal heart attack a year after its completion. His son, Gerald Chatham Jr., who was 11 years old at the time of the trial, would later serve two terms as district attorney in the same district as his father.

== Emmett Till trial ==
Chatham was aided by Robert B. Smith III and James Hamilton Caldwell Jr. during the trial, which started on September 19, 1955. He understood the national attention that the case was attracting, but said that he was "not concerned with the pressure and agitation which the trial ... produced, either within or outside the state of Mississippi". Chatham arduously implored the 12 members of the all-white jury to look past prejudice to bring justice to the crime. Nevertheless, a not guilty verdict was delivered on September 23, after just 67 minutes of deliberation.
