= White Rabbit (Lost) =

- Lost episode
- A hallucination of Jack Shephard's dead father Christian turns around to look at him.
- Episode no.: Season 1 Episode 5
- Directed by: Kevin Hooks
- Written by: Christian Taylor
- Production code: 103
- Original air date: October 20, 2004
- Running time: 43 minutes

Guest appearances
- John Terry as Christian Shephard; Veronica Hamel as Margo Shephard; John O'Hara as Young Jack Shephard; Sev Palmer as Meathead; Andy Trask as Hotel manager; Geoff Heise as Doctor; Meilinda Soerjoko as Chrissy; Bryan Sato as Richard

Episode chronology
← Previous "Walkabout"	Next → "House of the Rising Sun"
- Lost season 1

"White Rabbit" is the fifth episode of the first season of Lost. The episode was directed by Kevin Hooks and written by Christian Taylor. It first aired on October 20, 2004, on ABC.

The episode is centered on the character of Jack Shephard (Matthew Fox), with flashbacks revealing his past, including his childhood and his trip to Australia looking for his missing father Christian Shephard. In present-day events, the plane crash survivors begin to struggle as they realize they are running out of fresh water. While Jack tries to solve the conflicts, he starts seeing Christian in the jungle, and chases the hallucination of his dead father.

The episode attracted an estimated 16.82 million live viewers. It received mostly positive reviews, and was listed as #49 on IGN's ranking of every episode of Lost. After the broadcast of "White Rabbit", ABC picked up Lost for a full season, adding an additional nine episodes to the thirteen that were already scheduled.

== Plot ==
=== Flashbacks ===
A young Jack Shephard opens his eye and sees a bully in his dilated pupil. Another bully assaults his best friend, Mark Silverman, by punching him repeatedly in his groin. The bully gives Jack one chance to leave, but Jack decides to stay with his friend and so the bully punches Jack in his eye. When Jack returns home his father, Christian Shephard, sees his son's beaten face, he tells him he should not be a hero because he's weak and "doesn't have what it takes."

In September 2004, Jack visits his mother, who tells him that his father has abruptly left for Australia, and asks Jack to bring him back. He initially refuses, but she guilts him into doing it by reminding him of what he did to his father. In Sydney, Jack is informed by the manager of the hotel Christian was staying at that he has not been there for several days, following an incident at a bar. Jack finds alcohol, pills, and Christian's wallet in his room.

In a morgue, Jack identifies Christian's body. The coroner tells him that his father suffered an alcohol-induced heart attack. Jack later argues with an Oceanic Airlines ticket agent, who says the documentation to put Christian's coffin aboard Flight 815 is incomplete. Jack, frustrated, explains that all the arrangements are set for the funeral once he arrives at LAX, and he needs to bury his father, because he needs it "to be over."

=== On the Island ===
Jack rescues Boone when Boone fails to save a drowning woman, Joanna. Later, Jack is approached by Hurley and Charlie about how to deal with their diminishing water supplies. At the same time, Boone confronts Jack for saving him and not Joanna, asking who made Jack their leader. Jack again sees the man in the suit from the previous episode and runs after him. Upon catching up, he recognizes the man as Christian before he disappears. Continuing to chase him, Jack trips and is left clinging to a branch over a cliff.

Back at the beach, Claire faints from dehydration, and Charlie is unable to find the water rations. Locke volunteers to look for water in the jungle. While searching, he discovers Jack and rescues him. The two talk, and Jack says he does not want to be the leader because he "doesn't have what it takes." Locke advises him to pursue his "hallucination" of his father, explaining his belief that everything on the Island happens for a reason.

At nightfall, Jack follows a sound he heard in the jungle, leading him to stumble upon a cave containing a spring of fresh water. He also finds some debris from the plane, including his father's coffin. He opens it, only to discover that it's empty, leading him to smash it in frustration.

Charlie catches Boone giving water to an unconscious Claire. Boone admits that he stole the water in an attempt to take responsibility for its rationing. A fight begins between him and some of the other survivors, but Jack returns and stops them. He gives a speech, telling them about the water he found and that they all need to cooperate to survive, because "if we can't live together, we're going to die alone."

== Production ==
"White Rabbit" aired on October 20, 2004. The episode was directed by Kevin Hooks and written by Christian Taylor. Taylor declared the underlying message was of "a man's journey to find out who he really is", in how solving Jack's conflicted relationship with his father gave him an excuse to reinvent himself and was "integrated into what Jack becomes in the context of the series". Showrunner Damon Lindelof was enthused about working with the episode, even if "it did not end with a big shocking twist or surprise" like predecessor "Walkabout". Lindelof was particularly positive about "this great scene between Jack and Locke in the woods," which still influenced the characters' later discussions about faith, such as in the fourth-season finale "There's No Place Like Home".

In the scene when Jack is dangling from the cliff, Matthew Fox performs the stunt himself, as he considered that relying on stunt doubles "always sort of inhibits the director's ability to shoot it in cool ways." Fox dangled from a thirty foot high cliff in front of a blue screen, that through digital extensions appeared to be hundreds of feet high. However, Fox's long time stunt actor, Steve Blalock, performed Jack's rolling down the mountain before grabbing the edge of the cliff, given Fox considered that "there are some things that I'm not gonna be able to do".

The episode is named after the White Rabbit from the tale Alice's Adventures in Wonderland, who leads the story's title character, Alice, deeper and deeper down a hole to a whimsical world called Wonderland, while meeting different characters. Just as Alice followed the White Rabbit deeper and deeper down the hole to Wonderland, Jack follows his father deeper and deeper into the jungle. Geoff Heise, who shows Jack his dead father at the morgue, is also in the Pilot episode as a survivor. It is unclear why this is so, and whether or not his portrayal of two seemingly unrelated characters has any symbolism. The episode marks the first appearance of actor John Terry, who plays Jack's father, Christian Shephard (the mysterious man who Jack chases in the jungle). In the previous episode, "Walkabout", Christian was played by a stand-in actor, as the character hadn't been cast yet; thus, only the back of his head was shown.

== Reception ==
"White Rabbit" first aired in the United States on October 20, 2004. An estimated 16.82 million viewers in America watched the episode on its first broadcast, and it finished second in its timeslot behind the 2004 Major League Baseball season playoffs. Among adults aged 18 to 49, the episode earned a ratings share of 6.3/16, finishing in fourteenth place for the week. Based upon the series' success, ABC picked up Lost for the full season soon after the broadcast of "White Rabbit", ordering another nine episodes beyond the thirteen it had already agreed upon.

The episode received mostly positive reviews. Emily VanDerWerff of The A.V. Club gave the episode an A−, writing that "The structure of 'White Rabbit' is kind of half-formed, in a way that strikes me as very similar to the structure of 'Tabula Rasa', but I think that feeling of everything having been tossed together at the last minute suits the episode in a way it didn't the earlier one." VanDerWerff also writes, "the more I think about this episode, the more I admire it for taking away Jack's agency." IGN reviewer Chris Carabott gave the episode a 7.9/10, writing that it "features one of the best flashbacks dedicated to Jack." Robin Pierson of The TV Critic gave "White Rabbit" a 72/100, praising on how the writers did another "character heavy" episode without "trying to cram unnecessary action." However, Pierson added that the cliff scene was clichéd, particularly as "we don't really believe that he will die, so it is an action movie scene which we probably didn't leave."

Ryan McGee of Zap2it described "White Rabbit" as "a worthy successor to 'Walkabout,' and one of the stronger Jack-centric eps the show ever produced." Lost Episode Guide for Others: An Unofficial Anthology by Robert Dougherty says the episode is a must-see; it is "our first in depth glimpse at Jack's character". Dan Snierson of Entertainment Weekly gave the episode a B+, complimenting the "tantalizing peek" into Jack's dysfunctional relationship with Christian, "producing both juicy questions and eerie revelations". IGN listed "White Rabbit" 49th on their ranking of every episode of Lost, describing the "live together, die alone" speech as iconic. A similar ranking of episodes by Emily VanDerWerff for the Los Angeles Times placed the episode at 82nd, feeling it was "more notable for the things it introduces – like the Monster impersonating dead people" than the plot.
