= All the Best Cowboys Have Daddy Issues =

- Lost episode
- Charlie Pace (Dominic Monaghan) hanging from a tree by his neck. Monaghan had to be harnessed to a cable for up to five hours during the shoot. Jack's later attempts to revive Charlie was commended by critics.
- Episode no.: Season 1 Episode 11
- Directed by: Stephen Williams
- Written by: Javier Grillo-Marxuach
- Production code: 109
- Original air date: December 8, 2004
- Running time: 42 minutes

Guest appearances
- William Mapother as Ethan Rom; John Terry as Christian Shephard; Michael Adamshick as Anesthesiologist; Jackie Maraya as Andrea; Matt Moore as Husband; Mark Stitham as Head doctor

Episode chronology
← Previous "Raised by Another"	Next → "Whatever the Case May Be"
- Lost season 1

"All the Best Cowboys Have Daddy Issues" is the eleventh episode of the American drama series first season of Lost. The episode was directed by Stephen Williams and written by Javier Grillo-Marxuach. It first aired on December 8, 2004, on the American Broadcasting Company (ABC). In the episode, flashbacks reveal Jack Shephard being responsible for his father's dismissal from a hospital after performing surgery while drunk. In the present, Jack and a team go searching for two fellow plane crash survivors after they are kidnapped by somebody who was not listed in the passenger manifest.

The flashbacks were inspired by Grillo-Marxuach's background as the son of a doctor, and the episode in general went through several changes in the writing stage, one of them being the creation of two new characters who help look for the missing survivors, who were then scrapped in favor of including regular character Boone Carlyle. "All the Best Cowboys Have Daddy Issues" was watched by 18.88 million Americans and was met with positive reviews from critics, with several reviewers commending the scene in which Jack saves Charlie Pace.

== Plot ==
=== Flashbacks ===
Jack Shephard (Matthew Fox) operates on a woman who flatlines, and despite his attempts to revive her, his father Christian Shephard (John Terry) forces him to stop and call the time of death. It is later revealed that it was actually Christian's operation; Jack was called in by a nurse after it becomes apparent that his father was performing the surgery under the influence of alcohol. Christian attempts to cover this up by making Jack sign a form detailing the surgery, albeit with his inebriation omitted from the report, stating that the hospital will revoke his medical license if alcohol is mentioned. However, later on at the board meeting, Jack learns that the woman died with an unborn baby, and that his father already knew that. Horrified, he confesses to the board that Christian was operating under the influence during the surgery, which impaired his judgment that led to the chain of events causing the woman's death.

=== On the Island ===
On Day 16, October 7, 2004, back at the caves, the camp has learned from Hugo "Hurley" Reyes (Jorge Garcia) that one survivor, Ethan Rom (William Mapother), is not listed in the passenger manifest. Furthermore, Charlie Pace (Dominic Monaghan) and Claire Littleton (Emilie de Ravin) are missing. Jack and John Locke (Terry O'Quinn) run through the jungle to find three distinct footprints, indicating that Ethan took Charlie and Claire. Locke decides to go back to gather a hunting party, but Jack continues alone. Locke returns with Kate Austen (Evangeline Lilly) and Boone Carlyle (Ian Somerhalder) and finds Jack. After they find a knuckle bandage left by Charlie as a clue, the party find two separate trails. Locke takes Boone in one direction, while Jack and Kate take the other.

It soon turns out that Jack and Kate are following the correct trail when they find more of Charlie's knuckle bandages. When it starts raining, Jack believes he hears Claire screaming. Jack tumbles down an embankment to find Ethan, who warns Jack he will kill one of his captives if he does not stop following Ethan. A fistfight ensues, but Ethan gains the upper hand and subdues Jack. When he regains consciousness, Jack continues on, eventually finding Charlie, who has been hanged by Ethan. Kate cuts him down, and Jack furiously performs CPR—despite Kate's pleas that he is dead. Jack does not give up and brings Charlie back to life.

Back at the caves at nightfall, Jack learns from Charlie that "they" only wanted Claire all along. In the meantime, Boone and Locke are still looking through the jungle. Boone decides to go back to the caves. As Locke throws him a flashlight, Boone drops it, and it lands on a metal surface embedded in the ground. Curious, the two proceed to remove the mud over it to find out what it is.

== Production ==
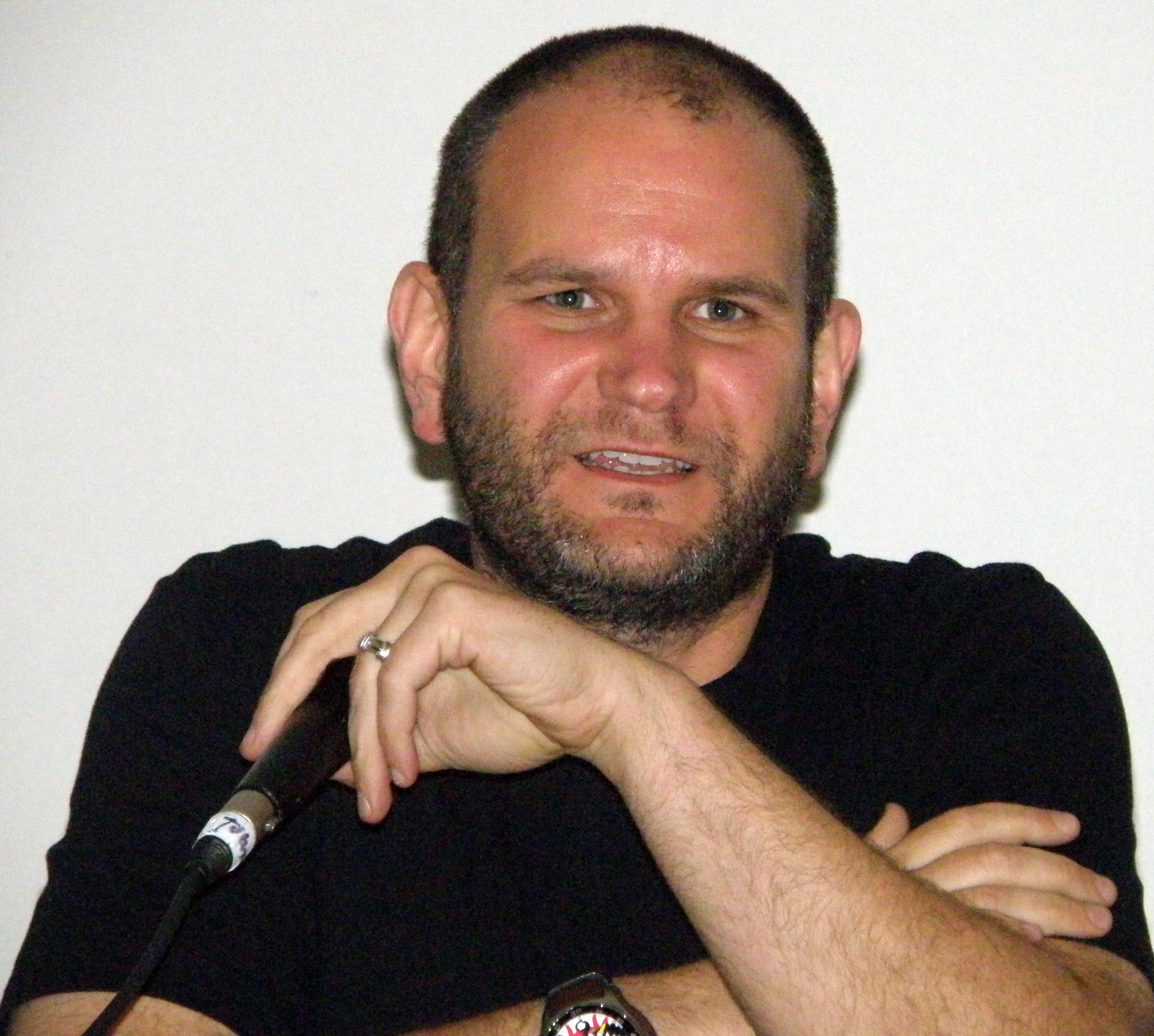
Javier Grillo-Marxuach wrote the episode.

"All the Best Cowboys Have Daddy Issues" was written by Javier Grillo-Marxuach. Throughout the writing process, the episode went through several changes. The working title for the episode was "What It Takes"; however, the writers deemed the title "lame." In writing Jack's flashback scenes, Grillo-Marxuach drew his inspiration on his own background as the son of a doctor. Two new minor characters, named Arthur and Sullivan, were originally created to accompany Locke. The idea was later scrapped in favor of including series regular Boone Carlyle." The idea behind the metal surface, which would be known as the hatch for the rest of the season, came when the producers were storyboarding the season. The hatch's discovery was to be introduced earlier into the episode, but was moved to the end to give the episode a cliffhanger.

With Jack and Kate's journey, in the original outline they were to come under a dart attack by the Others, the island's native inhabitants, however it was cut because executive producer Damon Lindelof deemed the attack too "cheesy." Grillo-Marxuach described the "hysterical CPR" as "the biggest cliché in the book," but added "the nine people who were writing for the show decided, maybe we earned that. It gave us the emotional payoff for the episode."

The fight scene between Jack and Ethan was performed by the actors themselves. The two were given the freedom to set up how their characters would fight each other. However, stunt coordinator Michael Vendrell wanted Ethan to be "as feral as possible; no school of combat, karate, kung-fu." Before filming the scene where Jack finds Charlie, episode director Stephen Williams scouted for a suitable location and found "what looked like a cathedral," because of the layout of trees behind where Charlie was hung. Monaghan had to be harnessed to a cable for roughly four to five hours. The actor described the scene; "they put me in the tree and I just hung there. I just hung limp. I tried to fall asleep, I tried to relax. When everything was going on, when they cut me down from the tree, when [Matthew Fox] was trying to revive me, when [Evangeline Lilly] was crying, I really didn't hear any of it. I just was in a semi-meditative state; however close that I could get with someone smacking me in the chest.

== Reception ==
"All the Best Cowboys Have Daddy Issues" received a 6.8 in the ages 18–49 demographic in the Nielsen ratings. The episode was watched by 18.88 million viewers, the sixth largest audience in American television the week it aired. It was also an improvement of over 1.7 million over the previous episode, "Raised by Another". In the United Kingdom, the episode was seen by 3.76 million viewers. It was the second highest-rated series to air on Channel 4 for the week.

Critical reactions of the episode were positive. Chris Carabott of IGN rated the episode 9 out of 10, calling it "a swift return to form" with "plenty of striking and emotional moments" that made it one of the better episodes of the first season. Carabott commented on the flashbacks; "We don't necessarily learn anything new about Jack from a personality standpoint," but Fox did "an exceptional job of conveying Jack's heartbreak as he reveals that his father operated on a woman while under the influence of alcohol." He enjoyed Jack and Ethan's encounter, calling it "chilling." Carabott also praised the scene where Jack tries to save Charlie; "I remember believing that they had killed off Charlie on my initial viewing and even though I knew the outcome this time, it was still a hard scene to watch," adding "after Jack finally manages to resuscitate him, you have to feel for Charlie because you know that he's disappointed in himself for letting Claire down." Another IGN article ranked "All the Best Cowboys Have Daddy Issues" the 33rd best Lost episode.

Emily VanDerWerff of the Los Angeles Times rated the episode the 79th of all Lost episodes (apart from the series finale), described the episode as "thrilling," but opined that the show since "has done similar things much better." Whitney Pastorek of Entertainment Weekly did not care for Jack's flashbacks, but commended the scene in which Jack saved Charlie, stating "even though I knew he was going to go back to the CPR and save Charlie's life, I started crying. This is how you identify good TV: When you know what's going to happen and you still get swept up in it all."
