= Raised by Another =

- Lost episode
- Claire does a second psychic reading with Richard Malkin, who advises her to get on Oceanic 815 to Los Angeles to give her baby up for adoption
- Episode no.: Season 1 Episode 10
- Directed by: Marita Grabiak
- Written by: Lynne E. Litt
- Production code: 107
- Original air date: December 1, 2004
- Running time: 42 minutes

Guest appearances
- William Mapother as Ethan Rom; Nick Jameson as Richard Malkin; Keir O'Donnell as Thomas; Jenny Chang as Rachel; Lisa Fraser as Arlene Stewart; Barry Whitfield as Mr. Slavitt

Episode chronology
← Previous "Solitary"	Next → "All the Best Cowboys Have Daddy Issues"
- Lost season 1

"Raised by Another" is the tenth episode of the first season of the American drama series Lost. It first aired on December 1, 2004, on the American Broadcasting Company (ABC). Directed by Marita Grabiak and written by Lynne E. Litt, the episode was the first to reveal the backstory of Claire Littleton (Emilie de Ravin). It also represented a shift from previous Lost backstories by being one of the first to emphasise the series' mythology – a decision that made the network nervous at the time.

In this episode, flashbacks depict the story behind Claire's pregnancy. Rejected by her boyfriend when he refused to raise their child, Claire decides to go to an adoption agency out of a belief that she will struggle to raise it alone. Claire visits a psychic (Nick Jameson) who warns her of a dangerous future for her unborn child if she does not raise it. In the present, Claire experiences terrifying nightmares and begins to suspect that somebody is trying to harm her unborn child. In response, Hurley (Jorge Garcia) decides to start a census of all of the survivors.

"Raised by Another" marks the revelation that Ethan (William Mapother) is not among the remaining survivors of Oceanic Flight 815 and is instead an outsider, revealed to be one of the Others alluded to in the previous episode. The final scene involving Claire and Charlie (Dominic Monaghan) being approached by Ethan was lauded by television commentators.

== Plot ==
=== Flashbacks ===
Claire Littleton takes a pregnancy test with the assistance of her boyfriend, Thomas (Keir O'Donnell), and it is positive. Thomas reassures her that everything will be fine and that they will be good parents. Claire goes to a psychic, Richard Malkin (Nick Jameson), who knows she is pregnant. After touching her hand, he has a supposed vision and becomes upset, but refuses to tell Claire what he "saw". Later, Thomas tells Claire he is leaving, saying that he is not ready for the responsibility of a child.

Claire returns to the psychic and asks him for another reading. Richard knows that Thomas left her and says that Claire must raise the baby, as, if anyone else parents it, the baby will be in danger. Though the psychic repeatedly tells Claire not to give the child away, she tells him that she's going to an adoptive services agency. Claire is about to sign papers so that a couple can adopt her baby, but none of the pens she tries work. After Claire thinks, she leaves the adoption agency and goes to the psychic. He gives her $6,000 and a ticket on Oceanic Flight 815, explaining that a couple in Los Angeles would adopt the baby and give her an additional $6,000. Initially Claire is skeptical about giving her child to complete strangers in Los Angeles, but Richard assures her that "they're not strangers" and that they are "good people." Even though Claire initially finds this change of heart suspicious, she accepts.

=== On the Island ===
It is Day 15, October 6, 2004, and Claire wakes up from nightmares two nights in a row, screaming. In the first, Claire wakes to find herself no longer pregnant, as she walks into the forest and encounters John Locke (Terry O'Quinn) at a table, playing cards. She asks him why he is there, but Locke interrupts, telling her "He was your responsibility, but you gave him away, Claire. Everyone pays the price now." Locke looks up with one white and one black eye. She hears crying and finds a baby crib. After unfolding several layers of material she dips her hands into a pool of blood and then wakes screaming; she has injured her hands by digging her nails deeply into her palms. In the second dream, someone holds Claire down and injects something into her stomach, though she has no wound.

Claire's attack persuades Hugo "Hurley" Reyes (Jorge Garcia) to take a census of the survivors to have a clear idea of who actually resides on the island. The next day, while conducting his census, Hurley talks to Ethan Rom (William Mapother), who seems concerned about giving his information to Hurley. Jack Shephard (Matthew Fox) suggests to Claire that she imagined the attack and offers her a sedative. Claire becomes upset that Jack does not believe her, deciding to leave the caves and move back to the beach.

Boone Carlyle (Ian Somerhalder) tells Hurley that James "Sawyer" Ford (Josh Holloway) has the flight manifest from the plane, and that could help him take the census. Sawyer uncharacteristically gives it to Hurley without any objection. While Charlie Pace (Dominic Monaghan) tries to help Claire move back to the beach, she starts having contractions. Charlie says he can deliver the baby, but after he accidentally confesses that he is a recovering drug addict, she yells at him to get Jack, which leaves her alone in the jungle. Charlie finds Ethan and tells him that Claire is in labor and to get Jack. Charlie goes back to comfort Claire, who tells him the story about the psychic. Charlie suggests that the psychic knew the flight was going to crash, and this was his way of forcing Claire to raise the baby by herself.

A badly wounded Sayid Jarrah (Naveen Andrews) returns to camp and tells the others about Danielle Rousseau (Mira Furlan), and that other people live on the island, besides the plane survivors. Locke looks on from the shadows with his arms crossed. Hurley reveals to Jack that one of the survivors is not listed on the flight manifest, which means that someone was already on the island when the plane crashed. Claire's contractions begin to stop. Claire and Charlie are then met by Ethan, who looks at them ominously.

== Production ==
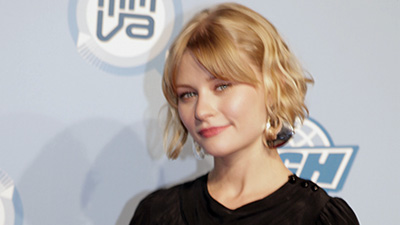
The episode featured Claire Littleton (Emilie de Ravin) in the episode's flashbacks for the first time.

"Raised by Another" was written by consulting producer Lynne E. Litt. It was the first to feature Claire's backstory before she arrived on the island. The episode's story was developed in September 2004, around the time that the series premiered on television. Series co-creator Damon Lindelof later recalled that when the network realized Lost was going to be popular, they read the plans for "Raised by Another" and warned the writers not to endanger its success.

The first season contained flashbacks of main characters to develop their back stories to viewers. This approach was changed for "Raised by Another", as the writers instead approached Claire's flashbacks as a way to reveal the island's mythology. According to Lindelof, "the network got really nervous, because that was a deep dive into mythology."

The episode's director, Marita Grabiak, had worked with Lost co-creator J. J. Abrams on the television series Alias. She met with him to discuss the episode's tone, and they also regularly talked over the phone once filming began. She explained, "He was involved in every aspect of the outline, the first draft, the second draft, just constant phone calls back and forth because, basically the challenge of that show was making the schedule."

Emilie de Ravin, an Australian actress, originally auditioned for the role of Shannon, speaking her dialogue with an American accent. Instead, they offered her the part of Claire; she accepted without reading the script, assuming it would just be a recurring role. While de Ravin had never been pregnant, she was able to learn of the experience from her two older sisters. She found the hot weather conditions in Hawaii difficult, later saying that "in many ways, the filming is actually like the drama. You endure the muggiest weather in the rainforest... You're really exposed to the elements." The actress admitted being "creeped out" by the premise of "Raised by Another", in which a psychic tricks Claire by sending her to the island to raise her baby.

== Reception ==
The build up to Ethan's reveal is exceptionally handled, with Jack doubting the authenticity of Claire's claims and Hurley creating a list of all the survivors so that they can keep track of who is who. The suspense builds and the final reveal is more than worth the wait as Sayid finally returns to the camp to inform the survivors that they are not alone. This occurs simultaneously with Hurley's discovery that Ethan Rom wasn't on the plane. It's a great conclusion that sets up the next episode and the latter half of the season perfectly.

— Chris Carabott, IGN

"Raised by Another" first aired on December 1, 2004, in the United States. An estimated 17.15 million viewers watched the episode live, meaning it finished in first place that night and in tenth place for the week among all major American networks. Among 18- to 49-year-old viewers, the episode earned a rating of 5.9/16 making it the eleventh highest of the week among that age demographic.

Writing for Entertainment Weekly, Whitney Pastorek called it "a decent episode made much, much better by its absolutely bloodcurdling final moments." Chris Carabott of IGN wrote in 2008 that while the episode was not the best of the first season, it was "noteworthy for its memorable reveal of the show's first Other." He praised the episode's suspenseful climax, with Ethan's revelation appearing alongside Sayid and Hurley warning them they are not alone. De Ravin's performance was seen as another highlight. Zap2it columnist Ryan McGee, also writing in 2008, praised the "stellar" episode for showing the first real antagonist of the series. McGee felt that Ethan's reveal helped Lost turn "sharply in introducing an on-Island, human threat for [the] survivors." He concluded that it was among the top five best episodes of the first season.

Emily VanDerWerff of the Los Angeles Times rated the episode 58th of all Lost episodes (apart from the series finale) and commented positively on the "nicely spooky flashback to the psychic who was way too into getting her on that plane to L.A." Rewatching the episode in 2014, Myles McNutt stated that "Solitary" and "Raised by Another" felt like "the first that go all-in on Lost as a serialized mystery," in part as Claire's story is the first to reveal a character's destined voyage to the island in the form of flashbacks. In 2014, MTV columnist Josh Wigler ranked it as the 76th-best Lost episode, stating that "Ethan Rom’s episode-closing reveal is one of the chilliest moments of early Lost."
