= Walkabout (Lost) =

- Lost episode
- John Locke is revealed to be paralyzed before crashing into the island. This plot twist is considered a defining moment of the show.
- Episode no.: Season 1 Episode 4
- Directed by: Jack Bender
- Written by: David Fury
- Cinematography by: Larry Fong
- Editing by: Stephen Semel
- Production code: 102
- Original air date: October 13, 2004
- Running time: 43 minutes

Guest appearances
- John Simon Jones as Travel agent; Billy Ray Gallion as Randy Nations; Stephen J. Rafferty as Warren; Bryan Sato as Richard

Episode chronology
← Previous "Tabula Rasa"	Next → "White Rabbit"
- Lost season 1

"Walkabout" is the fourth episode of the first season of the American drama television series Lost. The episode was directed by Jack Bender and written by David Fury. It first aired on ABC in the United States on October 13, 2004.

The episode centers on the character of John Locke (Terry O'Quinn), who in flashbacks is revealed, in one of the first plot twists of the show, to be paralyzed from the waist down as he attempts to join a walkabout tour. On the present day events, Locke leads a hunting mission after the wild boar in the jungle as the food supplies of the Oceanic 815 survivors starts to shorten, while other survivors decide to burn the plane's fuselage.

John Locke's backstory was conceived during the writing of the previous episode, "Tabula Rasa", and director Jack Bender decided to shoot the flashbacks in a way that enhanced the contrast between Locke's life before and after the crash. Problems involving the usage of real boar caused the producers to use computer-generated replacements and shots that suggested the animals' presence. "Walkabout" was watched by 18.16 million people and was reviewed positively, later being considered one of the show's best episodes.

== Plot ==
=== Flashbacks ===
In the aftermath of the crash of Flight 815, John Locke awakens on the beach. He lies on the ground dazed for a few moments, wiggling his toes, before Jack calls him over to help him lift some wreckage off another survivor.

Before the crash, Locke works a dull office job at a box company, where he is constantly belittled by his manager. He is planning on going on a walkabout in Australia, and has been training and studying for the trip for some time. He tells his plans to "Helen", a woman he is supposedly in a relationship with, on the phone. He invites her to come on the walkabout with him, but Helen is in fact a phone sex operator to whom he's grown attached. She breaks off the conversation.

Later, in Australia, one of the walkabout guides refuses to let Locke join, saying that he is too big of an insurance liability and had not properly informed them of his "condition". Locke insists that he's lived with his "condition" for four years and that this is his "destiny," but the guide denies him, telling him to go home. It is then revealed that Locke is paralyzed and cannot move his legs.

Locke's first awakening on the Island is shown once more, revealing that when he woke up, he realized he could walk again.

=== On the Island ===
In the night, boars raid the body-filled fuselage of the wrecked plane, causing Jack to decide it should be burned. The next day, the survivors discover that their food supply has run out. Locke reveals his case of hunting knives and suggests that they hunt the boars. He sets out, accompanied by Michael and Kate. Kate is also seeking to set up a makeshift antenna in the jungle at the behest of Sayid, who hopes to use it to help triangulate the French transmission they picked up two days before.

On the hunt, Michael is wounded by one of the boars. Kate helps him back to the beach while Locke presses on alone. Kate stops to climb a tree to place the antenna. However, before she can finish, she hears the sounds of the Monster, causing her to drop and break the equipment. The Monster heads for Locke, who stares at it in awe.

Jack checks in on Rose Nadler, whose husband Bernard was in the tail section of the plane when it crashed. Rose asserts that he is alive, and that the people who were sitting in the tail likely also think that the people in the middle section are dead. Michael and Kate return to camp, and when she goes to tell Jack about Locke, Jack sees a man in a suit walk into the jungle. Jack chases after him and Kate follows, but instead of the mysterious figure, they find Locke, who's carrying a dead boar.

That night, the fuselage is burned while Claire leads a memorial service for the dead using information she found in their passports, wallets, and luggage. Michael thanks Locke for hunting the boar and asks about the Monster, but Locke says that he did not see anything. Locke sees his wheelchair in the fire and smiles.

== Production ==
While writing "Tabula Rasa", Damon Lindelof suggested that John Locke was in a wheelchair before going to the island, and while the rest of the writing team initially reacted with shock, they embraced the idea. Lindelof wanted to embrace how "what you think these people are is actually entirely different", particularly since "Tabula Rasa" did not have many developments on Kate's backstory or why she was a fugitive, "the Locke thing was a huge, big, reveal". To enhance the plot twist, all the flashbacks were shot in a way that disguised the presence of a wheelchair. In the scene where Locke is sitting in his bed, the paralysis is alluded by the electromedical nerve stimulation machine on his nightstand. Lindelof also created a title for the episode, "Lord of the Files", a pun on Lord of the Flies and Locke's off-island occupation, but the writers had already settled on "Walkabout".

To enhance the contrast between Locke's pre and post-crash life, director Jack Bender decided to put very little green and blue imagery in the flashbacks since the two colors are the most present in the island – being the jungle and the sea, respectively. The flashbacks were also shot with fixed cameras and wider lenses, "Godfather-style", to display the bleakness and sterility of Locke's world, and objects such as vending machines were put to remind of the "things taken for granted" that the castaways lack on the island. The flashback scenes featuring the day of the crash (see above 'Flashbacks' section above) were shot in a way that looked similar to the ones from the pilot episode, with the only shot from the pilot being the one where Jack requests Locke's assistance.

The scenes featuring boar were originally planned to use actual, domesticated animals. Since bringing domesticated boar from continental United States was expensive, and the animals available in Hawaii did not look like wild boar and rarely moved (the script required them to run in most scenes), the producers decided to use computer-generated boar instead, along with reaction shots from the actors and first-person sequences from the animals' point of view. Instead of having a stunt double for Kate climbing the tree to place the antenna, Evangeline Lilly climbed the tree herself. The Australian office that hosts the travel agency was filmed in an empty retail space in downtown Honolulu.

The episode is the first to feature Christian Shephard, but he is not portrayed by John Terry, who had not been cast yet. Late into writing, the producers decided to start setting up Sayid's backstory by introducing the pictures of Nadia. The scenes where Sayid looks at the photos were reshot when production of "Solitary" began and Andrea Gabriel was selected for the role, as the original pictures depicted a different actress.

== Themes and analysis ==
Robert Dougherty writes that the episode possesses similar themes to "Tabula Rasa" – "Walkabout" is about "being able to overcome the past and start over." It presents the dichotomy seen in much of the series; while Jack is a man of science, Locke is a man of faith. Lindelof discussed that since Locke's healing was interpreted by the character as a religious experience, "this character had been presented as this very sort of mystical figure moving forward".

== Reception ==
"Walkabout" received a 6.5 in the ages 18–49 demographic in the Nielsen ratings. The episode was watched by 18.16 million viewers, an improvement of 1.6 million over the previous episode, "Tabula Rasa".

Reviews for the episode were positive. Chris Carabott of IGN in his "flashback reviews" gave "Walkabout" a 9.5/10, stating that "Terry O'Quinn puts in an exceptional performance", and commenting that showing Locke, who "seemed like a confident and resourceful man with a mysterious and intriguing past", to be a "shell of a human being that is trying desperately to find his place in the world" was "a perfect juxtaposition of the differences between Locke off and on the island". He also praised the supporting stories, claiming that "Matthew Fox does a great job of playing the uneasy leader" as Jack Shephard and that the Shannon-Charlie storyline "does supply a little comic relief". Ryan Mcgee of Zap2it described the revelation that Locke was a paraplegic as being "one of the show's signature moments", and commented that the episode "cemented the show as 'Must-See TV'" and was "a five-star effort."

Robin Pierson of The TV Critic gave the episode a rating of 86/100, saying that "Walkabout" is an episode "which seems to confirm all the promise of Lost's pilot episodes", and that the episode "both enhances and completely changes how we perceive both Locke and Lost." Dan Kawa of Television Without Pity rated the episode as a 'B'. Emily VanDerWerff of the Los Angeles Times said that 'Walkabout' is one of the most confident episodes a series has ever unveiled that early in its run" and that the episode "cemented more 'Lost' fans than just me, maybe more than any other episode."

David Fury was nominated for an Emmy Award for "Outstanding Writing in a Drama Series" for writing this episode. O'Quinn submitted his work in "Walkabout" and "The Moth" for the Emmy Award for Outstanding Supporting Actor in a Drama Series.

== Significance and legacy ==
"Walkabout" comprises a significant chapter in Lost's history, persuading viewers of the series' ability to exist in the long term. Viewers learned that the series would be full of surprises and mysteries, and Lindelof even considered it "a litmus test" for viewers, particularly regarding how after a twist like Locke's past, "the show isn't going to openly state what the implications of that are." Entertainment Weekly considered "Walkabout" to be the best episode of Season 1. IGN ranked "Walkabout" as the fifth best Lost episode ever, behind "The Life and Death of Jeremy Bentham", the Pilot, "Through the Looking Glass" and "The Constant". The episode was also featured in similar lists by the Los Angeles Times, TV Guide, National Post, and ABC2. Jason Snell of The Incomparable thought similarly, saying "Skippable? Are you kidding? If you could watch only one first-season episode of "Lost," this might be it."

The episode also shaped how O'Quinn viewed his character, as he was unaware that Locke would be paralyzed until reading the script. To the actor, "Walkabout and the fifth season episode "The Life and Death of Jeremy Bentham" are the two installments which "sort of (summarize) [Locke's] whole trip."
