= Larry Fong =

American cinematographer

- Born: Los Angeles, United States
- Years active: 1991–present

Larry Fong is an American cinematographer, known mostly for his collaboration with Zack Snyder.

== Early life and education ==
Fong showed interest and talent in art at a young age. His experience in photography and film was self-taught, beginning in junior high with short films shot on Super 8, cel animation, and stop motion projects.

He graduated from UCLA with a B.A. in Linguistics and Art Center College of Design in Pasadena, specializing in film and photography.

In addition of his merits as a cinematographer, Fong is also an accomplished magician and is a member of the Academy of Magical Arts.

== Career ==
He began his professional career filming music videos before working on independent films, TV pilots, commercials, and short films.

In 2004, he was hired to film the Lost pilot, for which he was nominated for an ASC Award.

In 2006, Fong worked on his first studio film, 300 (2006), directed by Zack Snyder, who he would later work on Watchmen (2009), Sucker Punch (2011) and Batman v Superman: Dawn of Justice (2016).

In 2011, he was accepted into the American Society of Cinematographers, and in 2012 he was accepted into the Academy of Motion Picture Arts and Sciences.

== Filmography ==
=== Film ===
Year	Title	Director	Notes
2000	Cost of Living	Stan Schofield	
2004	Cape of Good Hope	Mark Bamford	
2006	300	Zack Snyder	1st of 4 collaboration with Snyder
2009	Watchmen	Zack Snyder	
2011	Sucker Punch	Zack Snyder	
2011	Super 8	J. J. Abrams	
2013	Now You See Me	Louis Leterrier	With Mitchell Amundsen
2016	Batman v Superman: Dawn of Justice	Zack Snyder	
2017	Kong: Skull Island	Jordan Vogt-Roberts	
2018	The Predator	Shane Black	
2021	The Tomorrow War	Chris McKay	
2022	Chip 'n Dale: Rescue Rangers	Akiva Schaffer	
2022	Secret Headquarters	Henry Joost; Ariel Schulman	
2024	Damsel	Juan Carlos Fresnadillo	
2025	Death of a Unicorn	Alex Scharfman	
2026	Mike & Nick & Nick & Alice	BenDavid Grabinski	

Short film

Year	Title	Director
2000	Hero	Mark Bamford
2019	Battle at Big Rock	Colin Trevorrow
2023	An Electric State	Anthony Leonardi III

=== Television ===
Year	Title	Director	Episode(s)	Notes
1992	Red Shoe Diaries	Ted Kotcheff	"Accidents Happen"	
1992	Red Shoe Diaries	Ted Kotcheff	"Just Like That"	
1997	Sleepwalkers	David Nutter	"Pilot"	
2004	Lost	J. J. Abrams	"Pilot"	Nominated- ASC for Outstanding Cinematography in a Pilot Made for TV
2004	Lost	Jack Bender	"Tabula Rasa"	
2004	Lost	Jack Bender	"Walkabout"	
2004	Lost	Michael Zinberg	"House of the Rising Sun"	
2004	Lost	Tucker Gates	"Confidence Man"	
2004	Lost	Greg Yaitanes	"Solitary"	
2004	Lost	Jack Bender	"Whatever the Case May Be"	
2004	Lost	Greg Yaitanes	"Special"	
