= Eriq Ebouaney =

French actor (born 1967)

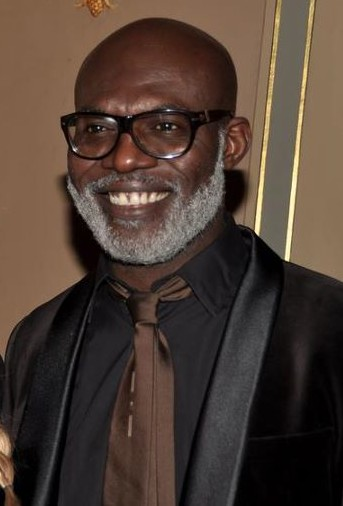
- Ebouaney at the 17th Lumière Awards in 2012
- Born: 3 October 1967 (age 58); Angers, Maine-et-Loire, France
- Occupation: Actor
- Years active: 1995–present

Eriq Ebouaney (born 3 October 1967) is a French actor. He is best known for his portrayal as the Congolese Prime Minister Patrice Lumumba in the 2000 film Lumumba, as "Blacktie" in Brian De Palma's Femme Fatale and as "Ice" in the 2008 action film Transporter 3 in which he starred opposite Jason Statham. Recently, Eriq appeared in the 2025 Indian-Malayalam film L2: Empuraan, playing the role of Kabuga.

== Early life ==
Ebouaney was born in Angers, France, the son of Cameroonian immigrants. As a child he didn't show any interest in acting and was set on becoming a businessman. However, at the age of 30, he joined a theatre company and left his job as a sales manager to become a professional actor.

== Career ==
He made his film debut in 1996 in the Cédric Klapisch directed film Chacun cherche son chat. He landed a leading role in the 2000 film Lumumba in which he portrayed Prime Minister Patrice Lumumba. The film was shot in Beira, Mozambique.

In 2002, he starred in Brian De Palma's Femme Fatale alongside Antonio Banderas. In 2004, he played the character of Jean Claude in Mark Bamford's debut feature Cape of Good Hope. In 2005 he starred in the award-winning Ridley Scott film, Kingdom of Heaven, in which he starred alongside Michael Sheen, Liam Neeson, Orlando Bloom, David Thewlis, Martin Hancockand Ghassan Massoud .

In 2006, he starred in The Front Line and La piste.

In 2008, he played a supporting role in the critically acclaimed Australian film Disgrace featuring American actor John Malkovich, a small role in the Italian film Bianco e nero and later was cast as "Ice" in Transporter 3, featuring British actor Jason Statham.

== Filmography ==
Year	Title	Role	Director	Notes
1995	Mon très cher frère	Ousmane	Raphaël Girardot	Short film
1996	When the Cat's Away	The cabinetmaker	Cédric Klapisch	
1997	XXL	Omar	Ariel Zeitoun	
1997	Seventh Heaven		Benoît Jacquot	
1997	Direct		Myriam Donasis	Short film
1998	Louise (Take 2)		Siegfried	
1998	La mort du chinois	Bekate	Jean-Louis Benoît	
1999	The Children of the Marshland		Jean Becker	
2000	Lumumba	Patrice Lumumba	Raoul Peck	Nominated - Black Reel Award for Outstanding Independent Film Actor
2000	Bàttu		Cheick Oumar Sissoko	
2001	My Wife Is an Actress	Club bouncer	Yvan Attal	
2001	Les Rois mages	Babar	Didier Bourdon & Bernard Campan	
2001	Lettre à Abou		Émilie Deleuze	Short film
2001	Villa mon rêve	Touré Dialo	Didier Grousset	Television film
2001	L'instit	Blaise	Antoine Lorenzi	Television; 1 episode
2002	Femme Fatale	Black Tie	Brian De Palma	
2002	A Map of the Heart	Strassenhändler	Dominik Graf	
2003	Le silence de la forêt	Gonaba	Bassek Ba Kobhio & Didier Ouenangare	
2003	Los Reyes Magos	Balthazar	Antonio Navarro	Voiceover
2003	Ciel d'asile	Patrice	Philippe Bérenger	Television film
2003	Les Cordier, juge et flic	Sissoko	Jean-Pierre Vergne	Television series; 1 episode
2004	Cape of Good Hope	Jean Claude	Mark Bamford	
2004	Crimson Rivers II: Angels of the Apocalypse	The cop	Olivier Dahan	
2004	Cause toujours !	The disinfection employee	Jeanne Labrune	
2004	San-Antonio	Jérémie Blanc	Frédéric Auburtin	
2004	Central nuit	St Jean	Franck Vestiel	Television series; 1 episode
2005	Kingdom of Heaven	Firuz	Ridley Scott	
2005	Paris-Dakar	The man	Caroline Jules	Short film
2005	Inspecteur Sori	Sori	Mamady Sidibé	Television film
2006	The Nativity Story	Balthazar	Catherine Hardwicke	
2006	La piste	Kadjiro	Éric Valli	
2006	The Front Line	Joe Yumba	David Gleeson	
2006	Cabaret Paradis	The commissioner	Shirley and Dino	
2006	Africa Paradis	M'Doula	Sylvestre Amoussou	
2007	Hitman	Bwana Ovie	Xavier Gens	
2007	Magic Paris	The man	Alice Winocour	Short film
2007	Reporters	Diallo	Suzanne Fenn & Ivan Strasburg	Television series; 1 episode
2008	35 Shots of Rum	Blanchard	Claire Denis	
2008	Disgrace	Petrus	Steve Jacobs	
2008	Transporter 3	Ice	Olivier Megaton	
2008	Black and White	Bertrand	Cristina Comencini	
2008	Ca$h	Letallec	Éric Besnard	
2008	Comme les autres	The social worker	Vincent Garenq	
2008	La dernière main	Marcellus	Thomas Le Hir & Djamal Mohamed	Short film
2008	Blood Money	Jonas Bergue	Martin Ngongo	Short film
2008	R.I.S, police scientifique	The Campus President	Christophe Barbier	Television series; 1 episode
2009	Thirst	Emmanuel Research Director	Park Chan-wook	
2009	La Horde	Adewale Markudi	Yannick Dahan & Benjamin Rocher	
2009	King Guillaume	The priest	Pierre-François Martin-Laval	
2009	Lignes de front	Mister the Beast	Jean-Christophe Klotz	
2009	Sous le fard	The vigil	Maud Ferrari	Short film
2009	Omar	Omar's father	Sébastien Gabriel	Short film
2009	Duty Calls	Client	Sébastien Cirade	Short film
2009	Julie Lescaut	Rémi Mertens	Alain Choquart & Thierry Petit	Television series; 3 episodes
2010	Thelma, Louise et Chantal	The real estate	Benoît Pétré	
2010	La ligne blanche	François	Olivier Torres	
2010	Le temps de la kermesse est terminé	Lieutenant Bado	Frédéric Chignac	
2010	Henry	Karanja	Alessandro Piva	
2010	600 kilos d'or pur	Melchior	Éric Besnard (2)	
2010	Fais danser la poussière	Souleyman	Christian Faure	Television film
2010	Carlos	Hassan Al-Turabi	Olivier Assayas	Television series
2011	Black Gold	Hassan Dakhil	Jean-Jacques Annaud	
2011	Case départ	Isidore	Lionel Steketee, Fabrice Eboué, ...	
2011	Implosion	Wilhelm	Sören Voigt	Television film
2012	Stalingrad Lovers	Jupiter	Fleur Albert	
2012	Italian Movies	Zahur	Matteo Pellegrini	
2012	Métal Hurlant Chronicles	Kaskoff	Guillaume Lubrano	Television series; 1 episode
2012	Clash	Abel Diop	Pascal Lahmani	Television series; 1 episode
2013	Dakar Trottoirs	Master	Hubert Laba Ndao	
2013	Le collier du Makoko		Henri-Joseph Koumba Bididi	
2013	Faim de vie		Jessica-Salomé Grunwald	Short film
2013	Aya of Yop City	Hyacinthe	Marguerite Abouet & Clément Oubrerie	Voiceover
2013	Jo	Amadou	Sheree Folkson, Charlotte Sieling, ...	Television series; 5 episodes
2014	3 Days to Kill	Jules	McG	
2014	Le Crocodile du Botswanga	Lieutenant Yaya	Lionel Steketee & Fabrice Eboué (2)	
2014	SMS	The big cop	Gabriel Julien-Laferrière	
2014	Paranoia Park	The guardian	Bruno Mercier	
2014	Ligne de protection	The judge	Virginie Kahn	Short film
2014	Death in Paradise	Theo Frazier	Robert Quinn	Television series; 1 episode
2014	Falco	Simon's father	Alexandre Laurent	Television series; 1 episode
2015	Boomerang	The psy	François Favrat	
2015	All Three of Us	Adama	Kheiron	
2015	Catherine ou les atomes d'une âme paumée	Doctor Daniel Koundé	Alix Véronèze	
2015	Maman(s)	Alioune	Maïmouna Doucouré	Short film
2015	Secteur IX B	The voice	Mathieu Kleyebe Abonnenc	Short film
2015	En Immersion	Kalach	Philippe Haïm	Television series
2016	Bastille Day	Baba	James Watkins	
2016	Le gang des Antillais	Politik	Jean-Claude Flamand-Barny	
2016	Zhong guo tui xiao yuan	Asaid	Tan Bing	
2016	419	Jay Jay	Eric Bartonio	
2016	Le Passé devant Nous	Michel	Nathalie Teirlinck	
2016	Ca va marcher	Eric	Guillaume Karoubi	Television series
2017	China Salesman	Sheik Asaid	Tan Bing	
2018	Belleville Cop	Ladji Toure	Rachid Bouchareb	
2019	Domino	Ezra Tarzi	Brian De Palma	
2020	Earth and Blood	Adama	Julien Leclercq	
2020	Rogue City	Stephan Jankovic	Olivier Marchal	
2023–2024	The Walking Dead: Daryl Dixon	Fallou Boukar		Television series; 9 episodes
2025	L2: Empuraan	Kabuga	Prithviraj Sukumaran	Indian film
