= Arctic blue =

Arctic blue may refer to:

- Arctic blue (Agriades glandon), a species of butterfly
- Arctic Blue, a 1993 movie by Peter Masterson
