= Cape of Good Hope (film) =

The Cape of Good Hope
- Directed by: Mark Bamford
- Written by: Mark Bamford; Suzanne Kay
- Starring: Debbie Brown; Eriq Ebouaney; Nthati Moshesh
- Cinematography: Larry Fong
- Release date: 2004
- Running time: 107 mins
- Countries: South Africa; United States
- Languages: Afrikaans; English; Xhosa

The Cape of Good Hope is a 2004 South African comedy drama film written and produced by Suzanne Kay and Mark Bamford under the direction of Mark Bamford. It was Mark Bamford's first feature film after his critically praised short, Hero (2001).

The film premiered at the Tribeca Film Festival and the Cannes Film Festival in 2004.

== Plot ==
Afrikaner Kate runs a Cape Town animal shelter, is involved with a married man, and is oblivious to the romantic attentions of Morne, a local veterinarian. The shelter's East Indian receptionist Sharifa is desperately struggling to have a child with her husband. Meanwhile, Congolese handyman Jean Claude finds himself torn between his growing love for a black South African single mother and his dreams of emigrating to Canada.

== Cast ==
- Debbie Brown as Kate
- Eriq Ebouaney as Jean Claude
- Nthati Moshesh as Lindiwe
- Morne Visser as Morne
- Quanita Adams as Sharifa
- David Isaacs as Habib
- Kamo Masilo as Thabo
- Nick Boraine as Stephen van Heern
- Gideon Emery as Miles

== Awards ==
- Austin Film Festival, 2004 – Won, Audience award: Best Narrative Feature-Undistributed; Mark Bamford
- Austin Film Festival, 2004 – Won, Feature Film Award: Best Narrative Feature; Mark Bamford
- National Board of Review, USA, 2005 – Won, Special Recognition: For Excellence on Filmmaking
- Image Awards, 2006 – Nominated, Image Award: Outstanding Independent or Foreign Film
