= La piste =

- French theatrical release poster
- Directed by: Éric Valli
- Written by: Philippe Lyon; Éric Valli
- Produced by: Cyril Colbeau-Justin; Jean-Baptiste Dupont
- Starring: Julian Sands; Eriq Ebouaney; Camille Summers
- Edited by: Hachdé
- Music by: Armand Amar
- Production companies: Gaumont; Les Films du Dauphin; France 3 Cinéma
- Distributed by: Gaumont Columbia TriStar Films
- Release date: 8 February 2006
- Running time: 90 minutes
- Country: France
- Language: French

La Piste (The Trail) is a 2006 French film starring Julian Sands and Camille Summers. The film was directed by French photographer and director Éric Valli.

== Plot ==
When her mother died, Grace returned to live in Africa with Gary, her geologist father, whom she had not seen much of since the divorce of her parents. One day he was advised not to fly due to bad weather. As he was excited by his forthcoming re-union with his daughter, he ignored the warning and took off. The plane crashed in the desert near the Skeleton Coast and Gary was captured by a band of guerrillas who were searching for diamond resources in the region. Police investigations were sluggish and Grace herself started an adventurous journey through the desert with a guide. Eriq Ebouaney enacted the role of the guide.

== Cast ==
- Eriq Ebouaney as Kadjiro
