= Jaded (film) =

- DVD cover
- Directed by: Caryn Krooth
- Screenplay by: Caryn Krooth; Wendy Olinger
- Produced by: Charles Block; Caryn Krooth; Wendy Olinger
- Starring: Carla Gugino; Rya Kihlstedt; Christopher McDonald; Anna Thomson
- Cinematography: Tom Hurwitz
- Edited by: Mary Morrisey
- Music by: Benedikt Brydern
- Production company: City Block Productions
- Release date: 1997
- Running time: 95 minutes
- Country: United States
- Language: English

Jaded is a 1997 American drama film directed by Caryn Krooth, and co-written with Wendy Olinger. It stars Carla Gugino, Rya Kihlstedt, Christopher McDonald, and Anna Thomson.

== Plot ==
Megan is naked and lying unconscious on a beach. Her body is covered in bruises. A woman jogging on the beach comes upon Megan, who turns so that more of her wounds are visible. Megan is transported to the hospital, where a nurse uses an instant camera to take photos. Detective Norwich enters the room and begins asking Megan questions, getting the names Pat and Alex as Megan's rapists, whom she met at Jack's Bar. Norwich goes out to the nurse's station where Assistant District Attorney Heller arrives. Norwich and Heller leave for Jack's Bar.

Norwich questions Jack, who says he did see Alex and Pat with Megan, and reveals that they left together at closing. He then informs Norwich and Heller that Pat and Alex are women.

Heller and Norwich confirm with Megan that Pat and Alex are women. Heller informs Megan she can't prosecute Alex and Pat for rape, stating that women aren't included in the definition of rape in the first degree. She then explains the legal definition attached to sodomy in the first degree, and that the penalty is the same, but they can't call what happened to Megan rape. Megan leaves the room and Norwich and Heller leave the house.

A flashback scene while Norwich and Heller are having lunch reveals that Norwich was at Jack's Bar and saw Pat and Alex dancing provocatively while Jack filmed them with a portable camera. Norwich and a uniform officer are next seen pulling up outside of a body piercing and tattoo parlor, where Pat and Alex work. Pat refuses to cooperate with the investigation.

Norwich takes a photo array to Megan for her to identify Alex and Pat. Norwich goes back to the parlor with uniform officers and arrests Pat and Alex.

When Pat and Alex arrive at defense attorney Carol Brocker's office, Alex has a noticeable black eye. When Carol asks how it happened, Alex claims she fell down the stairs. Carol says she will refuse their case if they continue to lie to her.

The beginning of the rape is then shown in a flashback sequence as Megan tells Heller what happened. Pat is shown hitting Megan several times. After Heller leaves Megan's house, the scene shifts back to Carol's office with Pat claiming Megan enjoyed the pain.

Heller meets with Louise Smith, who had previously accused Pat of assault but dropped the charges, trying to convince Louise to testify against Pat.

Heller and Norwich are talking about Kurt abusing Alex and discuss bringing in a psychiatrist to testify to the likelihood that Alex is also abusive. They arrive at Heller's car to find that someone has left a note on the windshield and a dead rat inside.

Carol goes to Jack's Bar to get his version of the evening and finds him negotiating a fee for something. When asked, he claims it is a property he owns. Jack states that Pat bought Megan a drink and Megan bought the next round, that they were pleased to spend time together. This is shown in flashbacks. Jack says Kurt was unhappy at seeing Alex and Pat together and may have followed the women to the beach.

Henry tells Carol that Megan doesn't seem to exist on paper, including not having filled out proper employment paperwork for her job. Carol asks Henry to check on the property that Jack claimed to own. Henry discovers there is no property, and that Megan's last name had been Geertskeel before she legally changed it.

Norwich takes a piece of evidence to have it examined and learns that it is a lens cap for a specific model of portable camera. She asks for a list of purchasers.

Carol calls Heller and asks for an in-person meeting to try to get the charges dropped. Heller agrees to meet the next day. Heller leaves her office that night to find another note on her windshield and all of her tires slashed. She immediately calls Norwich. They go to Heller's home where Norwich discovers that someone poured ammonia into Heller's coffee maker. Norwich calls the precinct to get an officer to come over and is told that the fingerprints on Heller's car both times belong to Kurt. He is also on the list of purchasers for the camera model.

Norwich goes to Kurt's house. Kurt tells Norwich the camera was stolen. Kurt begs them not to put Alex in jail as he's arrested.

At their meeting the next morning, Carol reveals to Heller that Megan's father murdered her mother. Carol uses this to argue that Heller's intent to have a psychiatrist testify about Alex's potential suppressed aggression would work against her. Heller refuses to drop the charges.

Heller calls Megan into her office. She accuses Megan of lying, of feeling guilty because she experimented with lesbian sex and choosing to accuse the women she was with of rape. Heller tells her this is what the defense will say.

Megan goes to speak to Louise, asking her whether she intends to claim Pat did nothing to her. Louise tells Megan about her experience with Pat, and that she didn't press charges because she herself is a lesbian and no jury would have ruled in her favor. That night, Megan has another flashback, but this time she recalls that someone else was present. Freddie and Megan go to Heller's office, where Heller is speaking with Norwich and tell them. Norwich reminds Heller about Jack having a video camera.

The next day, Norwich takes a team to Jack's Bar with a warrant, where she finds a tape in the VCR and watches it to find the rape recorded over a baseball game.

Megan states in a voiceover that the trial lasted four days. Pat and Alex are led away in handcuffs.

A text card ends the film, stating that many jurisdictions have changed rape legislation to read "person" instead of "man".

== Cast ==
In alphabetical order:

- Danny Aiello III as Kurt Arnold
- Richard Bright as Zack Brown
- Catherine Dent as Lisa Heller
- Frankie Faison as Henry Brocker
- Kevin Flood as Earl
- Ellen Greene as Louise Smith
- Carla Gugino as Megan 'Meg' Harris
- Rya Kihlstedt as Patricia 'Pat' Long
- Robert Knepper as Freddie
- Christopher McDonald as Jack Carlson
- Daniel McDonald as Bart
- Peter McRobbie as Dr. Mancuso
- Donna Mitchell as Joyce
- Chuck Pfeiffer as Dan Geertskeel
- Larry Pine as Judge Hayfield
- Anna Thomson as Alexandra 'Alex' Arnold
- Lorraine Toussaint as Carol Brocker
- Aida Turturro as Det. Helen Norwich
- Larry Weiss as police officer

== Release ==
Jaded screened at the 1997 Cannes Film Festival for the International Film Market, where it was listed as an erotic drama, distributed by Redwood Communications. It was also included in markets at MIPCOM in 1998, still with Redwood, and in 1999, distributed by Vision Films. Vision included it in its offerings at NATPE in 2000.

The film was released on home video on January 24, 1997, and on DVD January 18, 2000.

== Themes ==
The film notably addresses victim blaming in how the defense is presented in court. It also comments on the constraints of the legal definition of rape at the time.

== Critical reception ==
Jaded received largely negative responses from both critics and audiences. On Rotten Tomatoes, the film holds a 31% Popcornmeter score based on more than 1,000 audience ratings. Critical coverage of the film was limited; however, reviewer Christopher Null rated it 1.5 out of 5 stars, stating it was "ill-conceived," that the casting choices were odd, and denigrated it for the focus on the legal definition of rape.

Buzz McClain, writing for Video Business, stated that he found the film to be unfocused. McClain found some of the acting "distractingly mediocre" and said that some of the scenes did not retain the serious tenor of the film's subject. He also noted that the cover art of the home media suggested eroticism, which is absent from the film. A brief review from John McKay printed in The Hamilton Spectator compared it to television cop dramas. Like McClain, McKay did not enjoy the acting, and also commented on the promotional materials that visually compared the film to Wild Things. VideoHound rated it two and a half stars.

Film critic Alexandra Heller-Nicholas described Jaded as featuring an "evil" lesbian stereotype, a type of media portrayal of lesbians also seen in films including Sudden Impact (1983), Red Sonja (1985), and Girls Against Boys (2012). Film studies scholar Kelly Hankin noted that Jaded has a narrative connecting bisexual and lesbian women in bars to crime, like the films Basic Instinct (1992) and Mercy (2000), among others.

== See also ==
- Media portrayals of bisexuality
- List of feature films with bisexual characters
- List of feature films with lesbian characters
