= The Atticus Institute =

- Directed by: Chris Sparling
- Screenplay by: Chris Sparling
- Story by: Chris Sparling
- Produced by: Peter Safran
- Starring: William Mapother; Rya Kihlstedt; John Rubinstein
- Cinematography: Alex Vendler
- Edited by: Sam Bauer
- Distributed by: SND Groupe M6
- Release date: January 23, 2015
- Running time: 92 minutes
- Country: United States
- Language: English

The Atticus Institute is a 2015 American independent pseudo-documentary horror film written and directed by Chris Sparling about a paranormal research institute, which becomes home to the only U.S. government confirmed case of possession.

== Plot ==
The story of the film is presented in documentary format, with footage of the events punctuated by interviews with people related to them.

In the early 1970s, Dr. Henry West (William Mapother) founded the Atticus Institute in rural Pennsylvania, hoping to find evidence that proves supernatural abilities such as ESP are real. Despite the best work of West and his aides, however, every subject that comes to the institute seeming to display such abilities are ultimately proven to be frauds. The team is demoralized in their work by the time Judith Winstead (Rya Kihlstedt) is brought to the institute by her sister Margaret, who is troubled by her disturbing behavior. The tests immediately proves to be no challenge for Judith's incredible power, the team gradually introduces new tests that show her to possess even greater abilities than first imagined.

Judith's behavior grows more unstable as her abilities evolve, disturbing West's staff. Bizarre events begin to happen to the aides and their families outside of the institute, which they suspect Judith is somehow influencing, and many of them resign from their positions to escape from her. As the situation escalates, the team seeks help from the United States military; under the influence of military advisors, they conduct new tests that lead to Judith manifesting new abilities such as telekinesis and pyrokinesis. One day, Judith experiences a violent reaction to a spectral photography experiment, and when the images are checked, a cloud-like entity is observed temporarily leaving Judith's body during her convulsions. This leads the team to realize that Judith's powers are the result of demonic possession.

With this discovery, the military seizes full control of the institute under a pretext of national security, and the situation spirals completely out of control. Soon, the military decides that Judith's abilities can be utilized as a weapon against the Soviet Union in the Cold War, and they begin conducting increasingly inhumane experiments on Judith against West's objections. Using methods such as electroshock therapy, the military try to tame the demon and force it to cooperate in exercises such as identifying the location of enemy bases, ignoring the effects these tests have on Judith. As these experiments ultimately prove fruitless, the military decides to try removing the demon from Judith by having a priest perform an exorcism while a soldier is connected to Judith. The process shows promise at first, but Judith suddenly lashes out and gravely injures the priest, disconnecting the electrodes attached to her before passing out. As the staff try to reattach the electrodes, Judith experiences a violent seizure while the demon attacks West through the body of the soldier connected to her. An unseen force blasts through the facility, knocking out all present. As the cameras come back online, Judith is now free of the demon's control and restored to her true self, but still tied to a chair in an observation cell. She panics when she sees the carnage around her. The demon enters the room in West's body, having fully consumed his soul, and stands before Judith's cell as she pleads for help. West kills Judith by telekinetically bursting her heart, then calmly exits the room and disappears.

The film concludes with a note revealing that Judith's body was buried in an undisclosed location following an autopsy, and her case "remains the only instance of possession officially recognized by the United States government". Dr. West, having "disappeared on October 23, 1976" is revealed to have been declared legally dead in 1982 and his whereabouts unknown for over forty years.

== Release ==
The film was wide released on January 23, 2015.

== Reception ==
The Atticus Institute was poorly received by critics. On Rotten Tomatoes it has a score of 50%, based on reviews from 6 critics. Critics praised its original format but criticized the pacing of the movie and the lack of originality.
