= Brave New World (1998 film) =

1998 film by Leslie Libman

- Home video cover art
- Genre: Drama; Sci-fi
- Based on: Brave New World by Aldous Huxley
- Teleplay by: Dan Mazur; David Tausik
- Directed by: Leslie Libman; Larry Williams
- Starring: Peter Gallagher; Leonard Nimoy; Tim Guinee; Rya Kihlstedt; Sally Kirkland; Miguel Ferrer
- Music by: Daniel Licht
- Country of origin: United States
- Original language: English

Production
- Executive producer: Dan Wigutow
- Producer: Michael R. Joyce
- Cinematography: Ronald Víctor García
- Editor: Cindy Mollo
- Running time: 87 minutes
- Production companies: Dan Wigutow Productions; HOF Productions; Michael R. Joyce Productions; Studios USA Pictures

Original release
- Network: NBC
- Release: April 19, 1998

Brave New World is a 1998 television movie loosely based on the 1932 novel by Aldous Huxley. The film stars Peter Gallagher and Leonard Nimoy. It is an abridged version of the original story. The film aired on NBC on April 19, 1998.

== Plot ==
The movie loosely follows the plot of Huxley's novel, but adds a twist to the end.

Just as Bernard Marx is about to take over the job of Director of Hatcheries and Conditioning, replacing the disgraced previous director, Lenina informs him that she is pregnant with his child. She conceived it the night that John Savage fell to his death. She did not use her birth control that night. Bernard suggests that she say it was an accident and have an abortion, but she makes it clear that she will not, and so prefers banishment.

Bernard lets her go – secretly – and takes the job he has aspired to throughout his career, but he is soon unhappy, and no amount of Soma can change that. He has seen and learned to appreciate genuine emotions and human experiences thanks to knowing John, as has Lenina. As a result, Bernard follows Lenina into exile from society.

Director Mustapha Mond looks for Bernard at their scheduled meeting, and is handed a note. The messenger explains that Bernard got away from society by authorising a trip for himself. Mond laughs out loud to himself, indicating that he will not pursue them. The final scene shows a beach with Lenina and Bernard. They appear to be playing with their natural born daughter on the shore.

== Cast ==
- Peter Gallagher as Bernard Marx
- Rya Kihlstedt as Lenina Crowne
- Tim Guinee as John Cooper
- Sally Kirkland as Linda
- Leonard Nimoy as Mustapha Mond
- Miguel Ferrer as The Director of Hatcheries and Conditioning
- Daniel Dae Kim as Ingram
- Steven Schub as a Beta Clerk
- Aron Eisenberg as Male Panelist
- Tina Sanchez as a Beta Reporter

== Reception ==
The New York Times' Caryn James said:"The film fails to deal coherently with what is frightening about modern life and why". Radio Times's David Parkinson said: "the over-simplification of the premise...will disappoint admirers of the novel". City University of New York's Brittany Franklin finds the 1998 movie excludes the praise of Ford. The Ringer's Keith Phipps notes "Adapting it, on the other hand, proves far trickier. That’s partly because much of the novel is short on incident and long on ideas..." ScreenRant's Padraig Cotter says the 1998 TV movie has "a happy ending".
