= 3 Days in Havana =

- Film poster
- Directed by: Gil Bellows; Tony Pantages
- Written by: Gill Bellows; Tony Pantages
- Produced by: Sidney Chiu; Gill Bellows; Tony Pantages; Gordon Macdonald
- Starring: Gil Bellows; Greg Wise; Rya Kihlstedt; Christopher Heyerdahl; Don McKellar; Phyllida Law
- Cinematography: Pieter Stathis
- Edited by: Rob Neilson
- Music by: Keith Power
- Distributed by: Entertainment One
- Release date: 28 September 2013 (VIFF)
- Running time: 83 minutes
- Countries: Cuba; Canada
- Language: English

3 Days in Havana is a 2013 Cuban-Canadian comedy thriller written and directed by Gil Bellows and Tony Pantages. It stars Bellows as a Canadian businessman who becomes involved in an assassination plot in Cuba after befriending a hard-partying man played by Greg Wise. It premiered at the 2013 Vancouver International Film Festival and was released in Canada on 28 March 2014.

== Plot ==
In a warehouse, Anders questions a former associate, Benny, whom he accuses of selling out their boss, an international arms dealer named Libby. Benny confesses that he revealed Libby would be in Havana to a woman known as the Broker, and Anders kills him. A day later, Jack Petty meets Rita at an airport bar after their flight to Cuba is delayed. Jack says he is a Canadian insurance executive on his way to a conference, and Rita reveals that she has agreed to some kind of deal that she likens to human trafficking. After whispering the details to him, she hands Jack her hotel information. Afterward, Jack runs into an intense man, who he meets several more times, unnerving him.

Once in Cuba, Jack visits a fortune teller, who warns him of evil omens. At a bar, he runs into British citizen Harry Smith, who introduces himself as a travel guide writer. Harry insists on being Jack's guide and takes him on a tour through Havana's less tourist-oriented areas. At one point, Harry stops at gangster Pepe's house to pay a debt, warning Jack to stay quiet. Afterward, they visit a bar, where Jack becomes separated from Harry and nearly gets into a fight with two locals. Harry breaks it up by threatening them with a switchblade. Although wary of Harry's violent tendencies, Jack agrees to meet him for a party later that night. A flashback reveals Harry to be an assassin hired by the Broker, an elderly British woman, to kill Libby, who she says owes her money.

When Jack meets Harry in his hotel room, Harry is snorting cocaine. Jack awkwardly declines an offer of cocaine, and the two go to a club, where they meet two women, Day and Night, who they take back to Harry's hotel room. In the morning, Jack discovers the women have left, and Day has killed Harry. A mysterious man named Palmer arrives at Harry's hotel room and assumes Jack is an assassin he has hired; Jack plays along. When Palmer hands him a package that contains a pistol and information on his target, Jack goes to the Canadian embassy to report the situation. The consul, revealed to be Anders, leads Jack to believe he will be flown back to Canada but instead kidnaps him and brings him to the warehouse, where he tortures Jack for information.

Jack escapes when they leave to kill Palmer. Jack first turns to Pepe for help, but he barely leaves with his life. Jack hitchhikes to Rita's hotel. There, the intense man flirts with him, saying he admires how Jack is playing both sides against each other. Jack insists he is an innocent bystander and gets rid of the man by making an empty promise to visit his hotel room. Rita is surprised to see him but offers to help. As she kisses him, Anders' men break in and kidnap both. In the warehouse, Libby angrily asks Jack if he is the unluckiest man alive or a shrewd assassin who has engineered the entire plot. Though professing to be an insurance salesman, Jack demands they let Rita go. When Libby refuses, Jack grabs a pistol from one of the men holding him and kills all of Libby's henchmen, including Anders. Before killing Libby, Jack reveals himself as an assassin hired by the Broker. He whispers his true background to Rita, and then advises her to leave Cuba immediately.

== Cast ==
- Gil Bellows as Jack Petty
- Greg Wise as Harry Smith
- Rya Kihlstedt as Rita
- Christopher Heyerdahl as Anders
- Don McKellar as Pepe
- Phyllida Law as the Broker
- Michael Eklund as Intense Man
- Tygh Runyan as Palmer
- Lauren Lee Smith as Grace
- Kris Holden-Reid as Gordie
- Robin Dunne as Benny
- John Cassini as Libby
- Moneca Delain as Day
- Oluniké Adeliyi as Night

== Production ==
Writer-directors Bellows and Pantages met early in their careers as actors and agreed to make their own film. Twenty-five years passed before they followed through with their promise. The script was designed to put a character into a situation foreign to both him and audiences. Early on, an investor pulled out. Pantages, who had already invested all of his own money into the project, pushed forward. After writing a treatment, Bellows and Pantages sent it to ten screenwriter friends for feedback. Shooting took place in Vancouver and Havana.

== Release ==
3 Days in Havana premiered at the Vancouver International Film Festival on 28 September 2013. Entertainment One released it in Canada on 28 March 2014.

== Reception ==
Bruce Kirkland of the Toronto Sun called it "quirky and worth seeing", though not comparable to the work of its biggest influence, Alfred Hitchcock. Ken Eisner of the Georgia Straight wrote that the story is "sometimes clumsily told" and may test audiences' suspension of disbelief, but the cinematography makes up for it. Adam Nayman of The Globe and Mail rated it 2/4 stars and wrote that the film becomes less interesting after Wise's character Harry dies, as he is the most interesting character. Nayman also criticized the film's twist ending, calling it "at once unexpected and extremely unsatisfying", though he described the film as likeable for its pulpy atmosphere. Bruce Demara of The Toronto Star rated it 2/4 stars and called it a "tepid thriller" that it would have worked better if it were a spoof.

3 Days in Havana was nominated for Best Motion Picture, Best Cinematography, and Best Supporting Performance by a Male at the Leo Awards and won Best Cinematography.
