= Rya Kihlstedt =

American actress (born 1970)

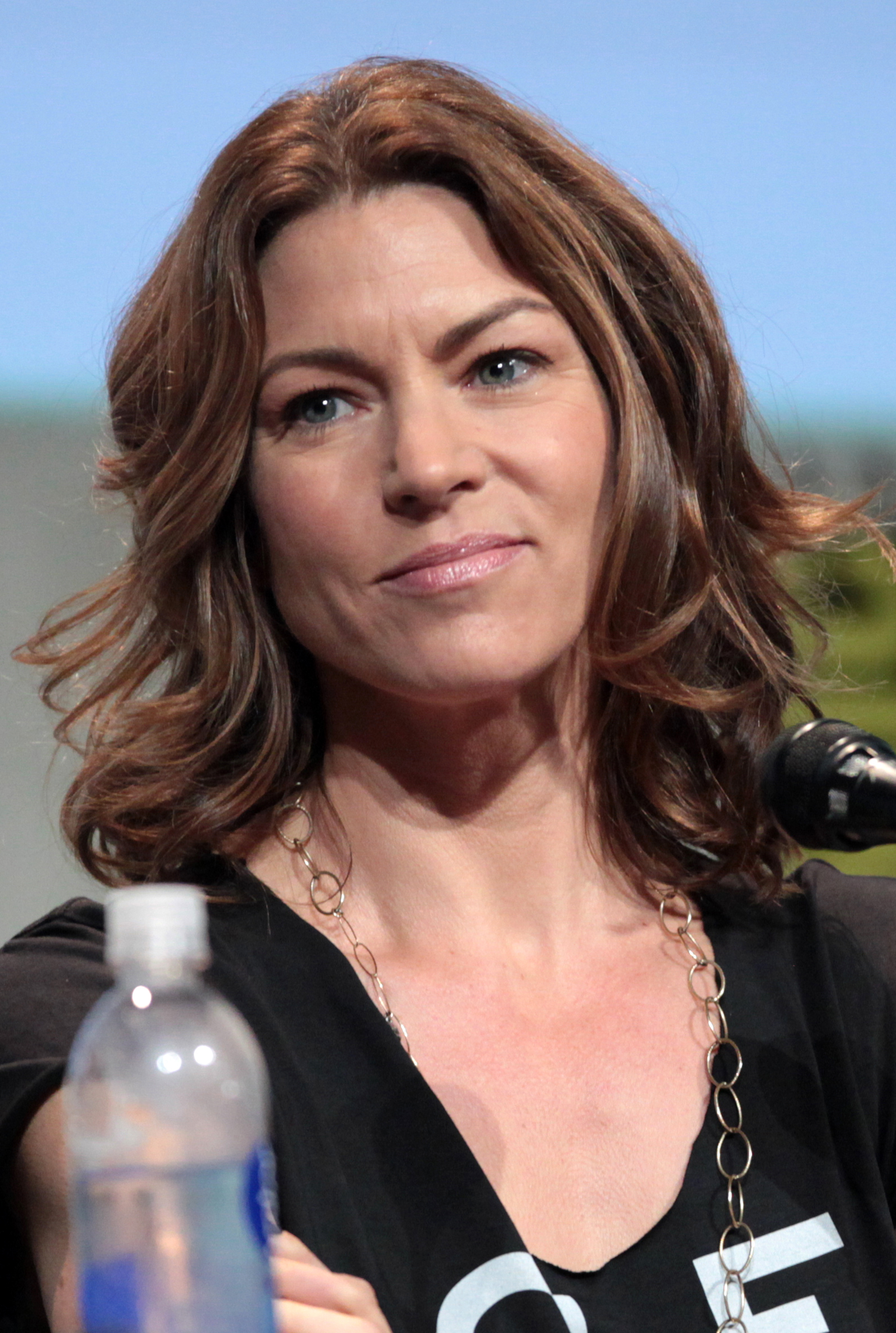
- Kihlstedt at the 2015 San Diego Comic-Con
- Born: July 23, 1970 (age 56)
- Education: Skidmore College
- Occupation: Actress
- Years active: 1993–2001, 2009–present
- Spouse: Gil Bellows (m. 1994; div. 2023)
- Children: 2
- Relatives: Carla Kihlstedt (sister)

Rya Kihlstedt (born July 23, 1970) is an American actress. She starred in the 1997 comedy film Home Alone 3 as Alice Ribbons. Kihlstedt would go on to appear in the films Deep Impact (1998), Women in Trouble (2009) and The Atticus Institute (2015). On television, she had recurring roles as Dr. Michelle Ross in the Showtime crime drama Dexter and as Marilyn Rhodes in the ABC musical drama Nashville. In 2015, Kihlstedt starred in the NBC miniseries Heroes Reborn, in 2022 in Superman & Lois as Ally Allston, as well as the Fourth Sister in Obi-Wan Kenobi, a role she later voiced in Tales of the Empire in 2024.

== Early life ==
Kihlstedt is a graduate of Skidmore College.

== Career ==
Kihlstedt made her film debut starring opposite Rutger Hauer in the 1993 action thriller film Arctic Blue. In 1995, she appeared in the ABC miniseries Heaven & Hell: North & South, Book III and in 1995 played Lizzie Elmsworth in the BBC adaptation of Edith Wharton's last novel, The Buccaneers. In 1997, Kihlstedt starred as Alice Ribbons, one of the criminals in the family comedy film Home Alone 3. The following year, she appeared in the science-fiction film Deep Impact, and co-starred opposite Carla Gugino in the independent film Jaded. Also in 1998, Kihlstedt starred with Peter Gallagher in the television film Brave New World loosely based on Aldous Huxley's 1932 novel of the same name.

Kihlstedt took a ten-year break from acting as she focused on motherhood and raising her two children. In 2009, she returned to screen appearing opposite her friend Carla Gugino in the comedy film Women in Trouble, and its sequel, Elektra Luxx. Kihlstedt guest-starred in a number of television series, including Covert Affairs, Criminal Minds, NCIS, CSI: Crime Scene Investigation, and Drop Dead Diva. In 2011, she had a recurring role in the Showtime crime drama series Dexter as Dr. Michelle Ross. From 2012 to 2013, she played Marilyn Rhodes, a powerful record producer in the ABC musical drama Nashville. Also in 2013, she starred in the comedy film 3 Days in Havana directed by her husband Gil Bellows.

In 2015, Kihlstedt played the leading role in the independent horror film The Atticus Institute. From 2015 to 2016, she starred as Erica Kravid in the NBC science fiction miniseries Heroes Reborn. Also in 2015, Kihlstedt was cast as Tig Notaro's mother Caroline in the Amazon Video original comedy series One Mississippi. Kihlstedt later appeared in Once Upon a Time, Ray Donovan, Agents of S.H.I.E.L.D. and NBC 2017 miniseries Law & Order True Crime. From 2018 to 2019, she had a recurring role as Julia Wagner in the CW series Charmed. In 2019, she had a recurring role opposite Carla Gugino in her series Jett, and played Kate Laswell in the video game Call of Duty: Modern Warfare. Also in 2019, Kihlstedt starred in the season three of the Canadian crime drama Cardinal, for which she received Canadian Screen Award nomination.

In 2020, Kihlstedt starred in the Hulu limited series, A Teacher. In 2022, Kihlstedt recurred in Superman & Lois as Ally Allston, the main villain of the second season and also played the Fourth Sister in Obi-Wan Kenobi. She later voiced the character in Tales of the Empire in 2024.

== Personal life ==
In 1994, Kihlstedt married actor Gil Bellows. They have two children, a daughter and a son. They separated in 2021. She is the sister of Oakland-based violinist Carla Kihlstedt, who has been a member of bands such as Charming Hostess, Sleepytime Gorilla Museum, and Tin Hat.

== Filmography ==
Key
†	Denotes films that have not yet been released

=== Film ===
Year	Title	Role	Notes
1993	Arctic Blue	Anne Marie	
1997	Hudson River Blues	Laura	
1997	Home Alone 3	Alice Ribbons	
1998	Deep Impact	Chloe	
1998	Jaded	Patricia "Pat" Long	
1999	Frontline	Catherine	
1999	Say You'll Be Mine	Katherine	
2009	Women in Trouble	Rita	
2010	Elektra Luxx	Rita	Uncredited
2012	Intelligence	Jaye Gardner	Short film
2013	3 Days in Havana	Rita	
2014	Sticks	Deirdre	Short film
2015	The Atticus Institute	Judith Winstead	
2015	The Squeeze	Beth	
2016	Judi	Judi	Short film
2016	Her Last Will	Maggie	
2018	The Empty House	Marie	Short film
2018	After Everything	Rebecca	
2019	The Untold Story	Roxy	
2019	Rattlesnakes	Esther Jarret	
2020	The Nowhere Inn	Holly	
2021	The Ultimate Playlist of Noise	Alyssa	
2025	Final Destination Bloodlines	Darlene Campbell	

=== Television ===
Year	Title	Role	Notes
1993	TriBeCa	Leah Woodward	Episode: "The Loft"
1994	The Second Greatest Story Ever Told	Arleen	Television film
1994	seaQuest DSV	Jessie	Episode: "Greed for a Pirate's Dream"
1994	Heaven & Hell: North & South, Book III	Willa	TV miniseries
1995	The Buccaneers	Lizzy Elmsworth	TV miniseries
1995	Alchemy	Louisa	Television film
1996	Swift Justice	Diane Rivers	Episode: "Retribution"
1996	Early Edition	Marcia Roberts Hobson	3 episodes
1998	Brave New World	Lenina Crowne	Television film
2000	CSI: Crime Scene Investigation	Carolyn	Episode: "Long Road Home"
2001	She Creature	Mermaid	Television film
2010	Covert Affairs	Helen Newman	Episode: "Walter's Walk"
2010	Criminal Minds	Patty Joyce	Episode: "JJ"
2011	NCIS	Linda Idleton	Episode: "Sins of the Father"
2011	Dexter	Dr. Michelle Ross	7 episodes Nominated – Screen Actors Guild Award for Outstanding Performance by an Ensemble in a Drama Series (2012)
2011	Connie Banks the Actor	Karen	Television film
2012–13	Nashville	Marilyn Rhodes	8 episodes
2014	CSI: Crime Scene Investigation	Carolyn Logan	Episode: "Love for Sale"
2014	Drop Dead Diva	Mayor Ellie Chapin	Episode: "Sister Act"
2014	Perception	Elena Douglas	Episode: "Possession"
2014	Masters of Sex	Tatti Greathouse	Episodes: "Parallax" and "Dirty Jobs"
2015–16	Heroes Reborn	Erica Kravid	Series regular, 13 episodes
2015–16	One Mississippi	Caroline	6 episodes
2016	Once Upon a Time	Cleo Fox	Episode: "Firebird"
2016	Ray Donovan	Jeannie	2 episodes
2017	Law & Order True Crime	Cindy Erdelyi	3 episodes
2017	Agents of S.H.I.E.L.D.	Lady Basha	2 episodes
2018–20	The Bold Type	Babs Brady	3 episodes
2018–19	Charmed	Dr. Julia Wagner	9 episodes
2019	Cardinal	Sharlene 'Mama' Winston	6 episodes Nominated — Canadian Screen Award for Best Guest Performance, Drama Series
2019	Secrets in a Small Town (a.k.a. Nowhere to be Found)	Ruth "Coach" Simmons	Television film
2019	Jett	Helen	3 episodes
2019	Yellowstone	Sam	Episodes: "Resurrection Day" and "A Thundering"
2020	Grey's Anatomy	Claire	Episode: "Love of My Life"
2020	Love in the Time of Corona	Sarah	Main role
2020	A Teacher	Sandy Walker	Recurring role
2022	Superman & Lois	Ally Allston, Bizarro Ally Allston	Recurring role, 12 episodes
2022	Obi-Wan Kenobi	Lyn Rakish / The Fourth Sister	Disney+ limited series; 3 episodes
2023	Orphan Black: Echoes	Eleanor Miller and print-out Eleanor	Main role
2023	Your Honor	Donetta	2 episodes
2024	Star Wars: Tales of the Empire	Lyn Rakish / The Fourth Sister	Voice, 3 episodes
2026	Paradise	Dakota	2 episodes
2026	9-1-1	LAFD Chief Walker	Episode: "Where There's Smoke"

=== Video games ===
Year	Title	Role	Notes
2019	Call of Duty: Modern Warfare	Kate Laswell	
2022	Call of Duty: Modern Warfare II	Kate Laswell	
2023	Call of Duty: Warzone 2.0	Kate Laswell	DMZ mode, voice only
2023	Call of Duty: Modern Warfare III	Kate Laswell	
2026	Call of Duty: Modern Warfare 4	Kate Laswell	
