= There Goes the Bride (1980 film) =

1980 British comedy film

- Directed by: Terry Marcel
- Written by: John Chapman; Ray Cooney
- Starring: Tom Smothers; Twiggy; Phil Silvers; Broderick Crawford; Sylvia Syms; Martin Balsam
- Release date: July 1980 (United Kingdom)
- Running time: 88 minutes
- Country: United Kingdom
- Language: English

There Goes the Bride is a 1980 British comedy film directed by Terry Marcel and starring Tom Smothers, Twiggy, Phil Silvers, Broderick Crawford, Sylvia Syms and Martin Balsam. It is based upon the 1973 play of the same name written by John Chapman and Ray Cooney.

== Plot ==
Adman Timothy Westerby (Smothers) throws his daughter's wedding day into chaos when he repeatedly hallucinates that he is seeing his "dream girl" (Twiggy), and refuses to leave her side.

On the rare occasions Westerby is coherent, the distraught bride (Fuller) has locked herself in her room, further delaying things.

Since Westerby is the only one who can see his "dreamgirl", this creates confusion with his wife (Syms) and father-in-law-to-be (Balsam), the latter of whom is a hot-tempered Texan prone to gun-toting tantrums.

Also, an important client (Backus) is expecting a new ad slogan for an important account starting yesterday, but Westerby is in no condition to deliver it.

The events of the film are dictated to a psychiatrist (Silvers) by a distraught patient (Stark), who was the wedding caterer and bewildered witness.

== Cast ==
- Tom Smothers – Timothy Westerby
- Twiggy – Polly Perkins
- Martin Balsam – Elmer Babcock
- Sylvia Syms – Ursula Westerby
- Michael Witney – Bill Shorter
- Phil Silvers – Psychiatrist
- Broderick Crawford – Petrol station attendant
- Jim Backus – Mr Perkins
- Hermione Baddeley – Daphne Drimond
- Graham Stark – Bernardo Rossi
- Geoffrey Sumner – Gerald Drimond
- Toria Fuller – Judy Westerby
- John Terry – Nicholas Babcock
- Pedro Gonzalez Gonzalez – Mr Ramirez
- Steve Franken – Church organist
