= Tabula Rasa (Lost) =

- Lost episode
- Kate is held at gunpoint by Marshal Edward Mars after being captured by him again
- Episode no.: Season 1 Episode 3
- Directed by: Jack Bender
- Written by: Damon Lindelof
- Cinematography by: Larry Fong
- Editing by: Mary Jo Markey
- Production code: 101
- Original air date: October 6, 2004
- Running time: 43 minutes

Guest appearances
- Fredric Lane as Marshal Mars; Nick Tate as Ray Mullen

Episode chronology
← Previous "Pilot"	Next → "Walkabout"
- Lost season 1

"Tabula Rasa" (Latin for "blank slate") is the third episode of the first season of Lost. It was directed by Jack Bender and written by Damon Lindelof. It first aired on October 6, 2004, on ABC.

The character of Kate Austen (Evangeline Lilly) is featured in the episode's flashbacks, showing how she got captured in Australia by the US Marshal Edward Mars (Fredric Lane). In the present day events, Jack Shephard (Matthew Fox) and Hugo "Hurley" Reyes (Jorge Garcia) learn that Kate is a convict and fugitive while Jack is trying to save the marshal from the injuries he sustained during the Oceanic Flight 815 plane crash.

The episode when broadcast in the United States was viewed by 16.54 million people and received mixed reviews from critics. It is the first episode to feature a 'Previously on Lost' segment, a clip shown at the beginning of each episode summarizing the recent events of the show. The episode receives its name from the philosophical idea of tabula rasa, meaning blank slate, a concept which is brought in one of the episode's final lines, when Jack tells Kate that all of the Flight 815 survivors should be allowed to restart with a new life.

== Plot ==
=== Flashbacks ===
Kate, sleeping in an Australian barn, is awakened by the farmer, Ray Mullen. She introduces herself as "Annie", a backpacking graduate, and Mullen gives her a job on the farm. When she later decides to leave, Ray offers her a ride to the train station. On the way, Kate notices a black car following them, and Ray reveals that he learned Kate is a fugitive, and has decided to deliver her to the authorities for the reward. As US Marshal Edward Mars closes in, Kate jerks the wheel and causes them to crash. Kate has a chance to flee, but stays to pull Ray from the burning vehicle, after which Mars captures her.

=== On the Island ===
Kate, Sayid, Charlie, Sawyer, Boone, and Shannon make camp as night falls. They decide not to tell the other survivors about the French transmission they heard on the transceiver, fearing that the news will cause panic among the other survivors. When an argument breaks out over the gun Sawyer took from Mars, the group agrees to have Kate keep it. Meanwhile, at the beach, Hurley sees Kate's mugshot, which Jack retrieved from Mars.

The next day, the party returns. Kate secretly tells Jack about the distress signal. Mars's condition worsens and Kate visits him in the makeshift medical tent while Jack searches the fuselage for antibiotics. Mars awakens and grabs her by the throat before going into shock. Kate asks Jack to euthanize him, but Jack refuses, saying that he saw her mugshot and that he is "not a murderer". Elsewhere, Michael gets bothered by Walt talking with the enigmatic John Locke, and instructs him to stay away from the man.

Mars's pain worsens, disturbing the survivors. Eventually he requests to see Kate alone, and asks her what favor she wanted on the plane before he was knocked unconscious during the crash. She says she wanted to make sure Ray got his reward for turning her in. As Kate leaves, Sawyer enters, and a gunshot is heard. Jack is furious, but Sawyer asserts that Mars asked for it. However, Mars is still alive; Jack determines that Sawyer's shot missed his heart and pierced his lung. Jack suffocates Mars to put an end to his pain.

The next day, Locke finds Walt's missing dog, Vincent, using a dog whistle that he carved. He brings Vincent to Michael, saying that as Walt's father, he should be the one to reunite them. Kate offers to tell Jack what her crime was. He declines, stating that their past lives are not important right now, and all of the survivors should be allowed a fresh start.

== Production ==
During production of the pilot episode of Lost, creators J. J. Abrams and Damon Lindelof got along with a team of four writers—Javier Grillo-Marxuach, Paul Dini, Jennifer M. Johnson and Christian Taylor—to elaborate ideas on how the show could continue. The resulting "Writer's Guide" plus a positive reaction to the pilot made ABC pick up the show. The season one writing begun in May 2004, with the first episode being centered on Kate and following the guidelines of a self-contained script grounded in reality. The script, credited to Lindelof, was finished by June. It was the first episode directed by Jack Bender, who came to the show following an invitation by Abrams. The episode is named "Tabula Rasa" after the Latin term meaning "blank slate", a concept attributed to the philosopher John Locke regarding how he believed humans are born without built-in mental content, then filled through their life experiences. Said concept is echoed by the final line of the episode, where Jack suggests the crash made the survivors into blank slates that could restart.

Both Joe Purdy's "Wash Away (Reprise)" and Patsy Cline's "Leavin' on Your Mind" are featured in this episode. Josh Holloway, who portrays Sawyer, asked showrunner Carlton Cuse how Sawyer could have possibly missed in his attempt to euthanize the Marshal. Cuse notes that the writers thought this to be unlikely as well and discussed the concept of making Sawyer hyperopic, leading to him receiving a pair of glasses in "Deus Ex Machina". This is the first episode of Lost to feature a "Previously on Lost..." introduction, which is a short recap of the most recent episodes to refresh the viewer's memory. The voice of the introduction was provided by Lloyd Braun, the ABC president who created the Lost pitch and had been fired during the pilot's production.

== Reception ==
16.54 million people tuned into this episode, ranking Lost as the ninth highest rating of the week.

Chris Carabott of IGN gave the episode a 7.7, praising the performances by the actors and how well characters were contrasted. The TV Critic gave the episode a rating of 63/100, saying that its "good intrigue from the writers because we want to know more about Kate and what she did", while also stating that the "lack of action may affect some who are hooked on 24's style of relentless developments and tension." Josh Wolk rated "Tabula Rasa" a B+, saying that "Kate's story is intriguing, though she's still not quite believable as a fugitive badass."

Robert Dougherty, author of Lost Episode Guide for Others: An Unofficial Anthology, said that the episode is "important in establishing Kate's past life", but that "it isn't that important in the grand scheme of the Lost design." Ryan Mcgee of Zap2it called the episode a "slight letdown in comparison to the pilot episode", but arguing that "most episodes fall short of the pilot's brilliance" and that the use of flashbacks "demonstrated [Lost] would be a character-based drama, a move that solidified its audience and let [its viewers] gradually know the many people that crash landed on the Island." Dan Kawa of Television Without Pity gave the episode a C+.
