= Arctic Blue =

- Directed by: Peter Masterson
- Written by: Ross LaManna
- Produced by: Rick Stevenson, Rutger Hauer, John Flock, Paul L. Newman
- Starring: Rutger Hauer; Dylan Walsh; Rya Kihlstedt; John Cuthbert; Kevin Cooney
- Cinematography: Thomas Burstyn, CSC
- Edited by: George Appleby
- Music by: Peter Melnick
- Distributed by: Columbia Tri Star, Arctic Blue Inc.
- Release date: 1993
- Running time: 95 minutes
- Country: United States
- Language: English
- Budget: US$ 6,000,000

Arctic Blue is a 1993 action thriller film directed by Peter Masterson and starring Rutger Hauer, Dylan Walsh, Rya Kihlstedt, and John Cuthbert.

== Premise ==
Eric Desmond is an amateur marshal in the wilderness of Alaska who has to deal with a homicidal trapper Ben Corbett, his fellow trappers and a greedy politician.

== Cast ==
- Rutger Hauer as Ben Corbett
- Dylan Walsh as Eric Desmond
- Rya Kihlstedt as Anne Marie
- John Cuthbert as Lemalle
- John Bear Curtis as Mitchell
- Bill Croft as Bob 'Viking' Corbett
- Richard Bradford as Sam Wilder
- Kevin Cooney as Leo Meyerling
- Michael Lawrenchuk as Earl Kenai
- Steven E. Miller as Arthur Neff
- Gunargie O'Sullivan as Dixie

== VHS and DVD releases ==
The film was released on VHS in the U.S. on September 19, 1995 from Columbia TriStar Home Video. It was released on DVD in the U.S. in 2001.

== See also ==
- 3:10 to Yuma (1957 film), the first film adaptation directed by Delmer Daves and starring Glenn Ford (as Wade), Van Heflin (as Evans), and Felicia Farr (as Emmy).
