= Hero (2000 film) =

- Directed by: Mark Bamford
- Written by: Mark Bamford; Suzanne Kay Bamford
- Produced by: Suzanne Kay Bamford
- Cinematography: Larry Fong
- Edited by: Robert A. Ferretti
- Music by: Alex Wurman
- Production company: Wonder View Films
- Distributed by: Atom Films
- Release date: 1 January 2000
- Running time: 15 min.
- Country: USA
- Language: English

Hero (2000) is a short subject film directed and written by Mark Bamford. His wife Suzanne Kay Bamford wrote and produced the film. Hero played at international film festivals and subsequently sold worldwide for television. It was filmed in Kinderhook, New York, United States.

== Summary ==
Set during the Second World War, an American sergeant faces the dilemma of helping a German woman in difficult circumstances. A reminder of how human nature can break through the boundaries of hatred.

== Cast ==
- Alan Gelfant as Sgt. Warshaw
- Julianne Nicholson as Young German Woman
- Tom Tate as the Dead Nazi

== Awards ==
- In 2001 won the Atom Films award - Director to Watch
