= Solitary (Lost) =

- Lost episode
- Sayid and Danielle Rousseau have a stand-off in the jungle after Sayid leaves Rousseau’s confinement
- Episode no.: Season 1 Episode 9
- Directed by: Greg Yaitanes
- Written by: David Fury
- Production code: 108
- Original air date: November 17, 2004
- Running time: 43 minutes

Guest appearances
- William Mapother as Ethan Rom; Mira Furlan as Danielle Rousseau; Andrea Gabriel as Nadia Jazeem; Scott Paulin as Sullivan; Navid Negahban as Omar; Xavier Alaniz as Falah

Episode chronology
| ← Previous "Confidence Man" | Next → "Raised by Another" |
- Lost season 1

"Solitary" is the ninth episode of the first season of Lost, an American television drama series following the survivors of a plane crash stranded on a tropical island. The episode was directed by Greg Yaitanes and written by David Fury. It first aired on November 17, 2004, on the American Broadcasting Company (ABC). Sayid Jarrah (Naveen Andrews) is captured by a mysterious French person, who is later revealed to be Danielle Rousseau (Mira Furlan), a woman who shipwrecked on the island sixteen years before the crash of Oceanic Flight 815 and was alone for almost the entire time. At the island's camp, Hugo "Hurley" Reyes (Jorge Garcia) creates a golf course in an attempt to relieve the survivors' stress and worry. In flashbacks, Sayid meets a childhood friend, but must interrogate her.

"Solitary" marked the introduction of mythology into Lost, and also solved the first mystery of the series: the origin of the transmission heard in part two of the pilot episode. It also introduced Danielle Rousseau, who would be in a total of 22 episodes through the show. The episode's initial broadcast in the United States attracted 17.64 million viewers. It has had a generally positive reception by critics.

== Plot ==
=== Flashbacks ===
Sayid is torturing a Shiite prisoner suspected of bombing "the Party's" headquarters. When he steps outside, he sees a new prisoner who he recognizes. He is then instructed to torture her until she answers his questions. Sayid discovers that the woman is Nadia (Andrea Gabriel), a childhood friend. She reveals that she has been tortured before, and nothing Sayid does will persuade her to talk. Omar (Navid Negahban), Sayid's friend and superior officer, tells him to execute Nadia. Sayid cuffs Nadia and puts a hood over her head. When he and Nadia are alone he frees her and tells her how to escape. Omar finds them but Sayid fatally shoots him. Nadia thinks that Sayid will have to escape with her now, but he instead shoots himself in the leg and tells her to leave as reinforcements arrive, making it appear as if Nadia shot Sayid and the other officer to escape.

=== On the island ===
On Day 12—October 3, 2004—Sayid finds a peculiar cable running out of the ocean and into the jungle. While following it, he is caught in a trap. Sayid is suspended upside down, held by a rope, and recites the Shahadah. A mysterious French woman (Mira Furlan) cuts him down and ties him to a bed in a bunker. She asks where Alex is, but when Sayid says he does not know, she uses batteries and a cable to shock him. Sayid tells his torturer about the plane crash and the French transmission the survivors heard when they first crashed on the island. The torturer then identifies herself as Danielle Rousseau, the woman who sent out the transmission. Danielle finds a picture of a woman among Sayid's possessions, and Sayid identifies the subject as Nadia.

The next day, many survivors in the island's camp are stressed, including Sullivan (Scott Paulin), who is diagnosed with hives by Jack Shephard (Matthew Fox). John Locke (Terry O'Quinn) and his new hunting companion, Ethan Rom (William Mapother), give some newly found luggage to Hurley; he looks through it and finds golf clubs. The next morning, Hurley builds a golf course to improve morale amongst the survivors. Jack, Charlie, and Michael decide to join him, and eventually around twenty people, including Kate and Sawyer, arrive to participate.

Rousseau asks Sayid about Nadia, and he says that she is dead because of him. Rousseau shows Sayid a broken music box given to her as a gift, and he tells her he can fix it. Rousseau reveals that she was part of a science team, and they were shipwrecked on the island about three days after leaving Tahiti. She identifies the "Others" as the carriers of a sickness that her companions caught, and says that the Others whisper in the jungle, although she has never seen them. Sayid does not believe her, but continues to fix the music box. After finishing the repairs, much to Rousseau's joy, he asks her to let him go. The duo hear a growl outside, and Rousseau pursues it, leaving Sayid alone.

Sayid escapes from Rousseau's bunker while she is gone, grabbing a rifle, maps and notes she has made about the island. Rousseau finds him and they have a standoff; he tries to fire the rifle, but no bullet discharges. Rousseau says she removed the firing pin, and Robert, her former lover, made the same mistake before she killed him. She reveals that it was she who killed her team, aiming to stop the disease from reaching the outside world. Sayid talks Rousseau into letting him go, but, before leaving, asks about Alex. Rousseau says that Alex was her child. While trying to find his way back to camp, Sayid hears the whispering of which Rousseau had spoken.

== Production ==
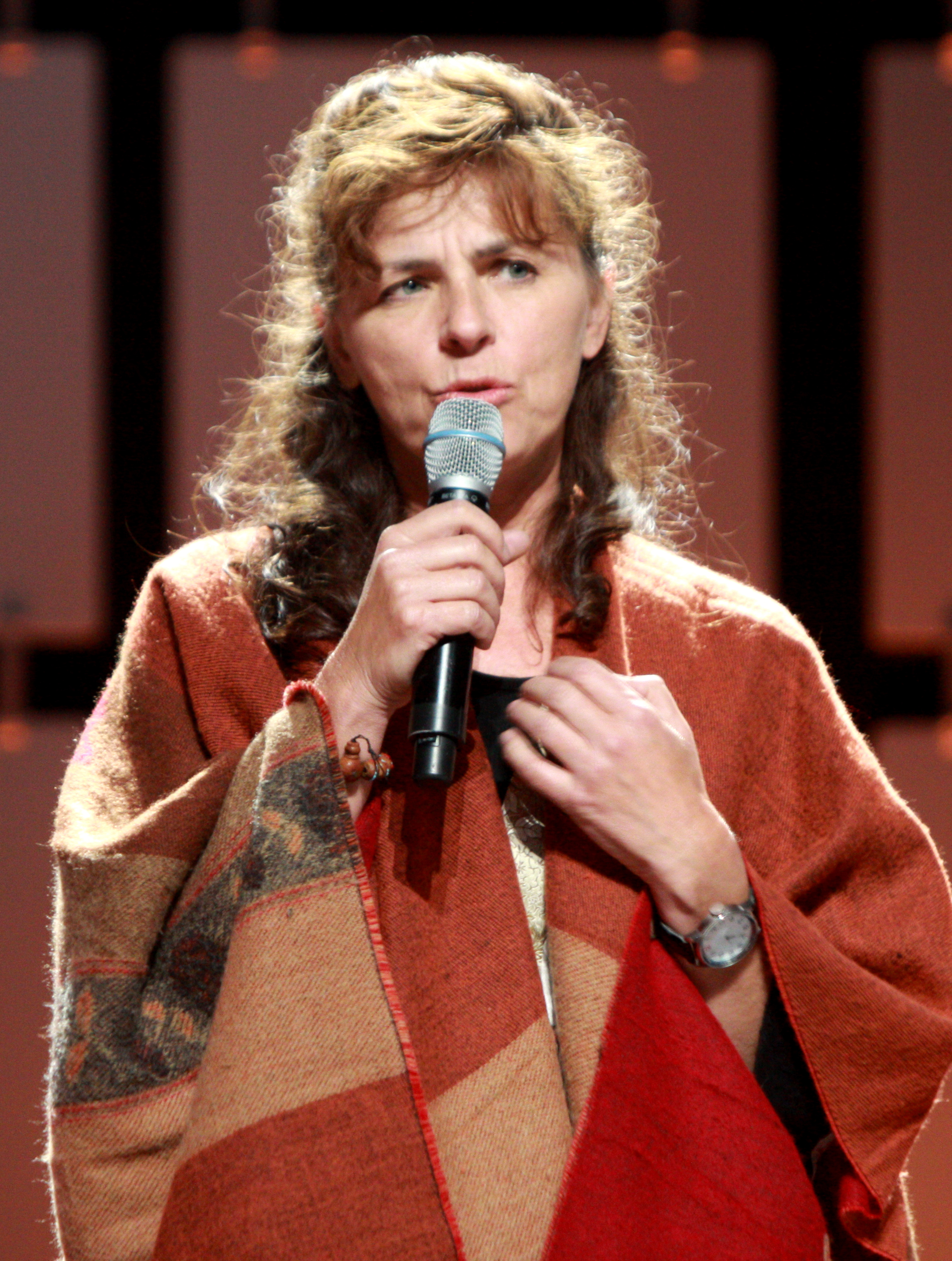
"Solitary" marked the debut of Mira Furlan as Danielle Rousseau.

The episode was written by David Fury and directed by Greg Yaitanes. According to series co-creator Damon Lindelof, discussion of both "Solitary" and the following episode, "Raised by Another", began in September 2004, when Lost debuted on television. The production team had fallen behind schedule, so Fury worked on "Solitary" while others went to a separate room to discuss "Raised by Another", with writer Carlton Cuse "bouncing between the two universes". Although production codes generally go in ascending order, "Solitary" had production code 107, while "Raised by Another" had production code 106. This was because, despite the broadcast dates, "Raised by Another" was written before "Solitary". The episodes were edited so that Sayid would return at the end of "Raised by Another". "Solitary" and "Raised by Another" were the first to orient the series in a "weird and mythological" direction, according to Lindelof. In "Solitary", the series solved its first mystery by revealing the origin of the French voice heard earlier. This reveal occurred despite the network encouraging the producers to wait until the finale to show Rousseau.

The episode was the first to feature flashbacks with Sayid, an Arab character. The producers knew they had to tread carefully with the character due to possible prejudices against Arabs. The actor, Naveen Andrews, said, "we were all pretty nervous, in the sense that we all felt we owed a real obligation, not just to Iraqis but the entire Arab world about how this character would be played." In an early draft of "Solitary", Rousseau told Sayid that she and her research team were studying time. When ABC saw this draft, they asked the producers to remove this line, explaining that they did not want the show to venture into science fiction during the first season. The character of Sullivan, to whose medical woes Jack tended, was created to make the rest of the survivors think that Rousseau's team was killed by an illness. The idea for Hurley's golf course came from script coordinator Brent Fletcher; it was based on a miniature golf course he created in the offices for the television show Angel.

== Reception ==
"Solitary" first aired in the United States on November 17, 2004. An estimated 17.64 million American viewers watched the episode on ABC, a decrease from 18.44 million viewers in the previous episode, "Confidence Man". In a review of the episode, Chris Carabott of IGN commented that Rousseau appeared to be more emotionally fragile than in later seasons, and was like a "loose cannon". Carabott found that as the series progressed and the mystery around the character was lessened, Rousseau was unable to deliver the same impact she made in her first appearance. Myles McNutt of The A.V. Club commended Mira Furlan's performance, writing, "[Rousseau is] an unreliable historian of the island in the best way. Rousseau has been on this island for over sixteen years, and it shows in her ramshackle bunker, her unkempt appearance, and the fact she tortures Sayid for information before even asking him a cursory question about his identity."

In a ranking of every episode of Lost (excluding the finale) for the Los Angeles Times, Emily VanDerWerff ranked "Solitary" as the show's 45th best episode, and called it underrated. In a similar list, IGN staff ranked the episode as Lost's 51st best, and observed that "despite [Sayid's] dark past, it was hard not to love the character even more after this episode." MTV ranked the episode the 32nd best of the series. Writing for Zap2it in 2008, Ryan McGee said he particularly enjoyed the episode and deemed it one of his top ten favorite episodes that had aired up to that point. McGee explained that "Solitary" contains "a lot of enclosed encounters between two people, set against a gorgeously shot B story that warms the heart."
