= Ethan Rom =

Lost character

Ethan Goodspeed
- Lost character
- First appearance: "Solitary"
- Last appearance: "What Kate Does"
- Portrayed by: William Mapother; Devon Gearhart (boy)

In-universe information
- Gender: Male
- Occupation: Surgeon of the Others
- Relatives: Horace Goodspeed (Father); Amy Goodspeed (Mother)
- Former residence: The Island

Ethan Rom is a fictional character portrayed by William Mapother on the ABC television show Lost. Introduced in the first season as the main antagonist, Ethan is the surgeon for the antagonistic and mysterious group known as the "Others". He infiltrated the fuselage survivors, posing as one of them until they discovered his true identity. He then kidnapped Charlie Pace and the pregnant Claire Littleton, attempting to dispose of the former soon after. Ethan is one of the few characters to have more episode appearances while his character was dead rather than alive. Ethan is one of few people known to have been born on the island, as seen in the ninth episode of the fifth season, "Namaste".

== Character biography ==
=== Before the crash ===
Ethan was born on the island in 1977 to Horace Goodspeed and Amy of the Dharma Initiative. By the time he was 11 (1988), Ethan had joined the Others and assisted Ben in kidnapping baby Alex from Danielle Rousseau. Ethan claims to have lived in Ontario, Canada, for some time but this was part of his alibi to the Flight 815 survivors. Ethan worked as a surgeon for the Others. Prior to the crash of Oceanic Flight 815, Ethan encounters a time traveling John Locke the day the drug smugglers' plane crash landed on the island. Ethan shoots him in the leg and nearly kills John before a time jump moves John forward in time. Ethan doesn't seem to recall the encounter in the present. Around three years before the crash, he travels from the island to Florida by submarine to recruit Juliet Burke, with the help of Richard Alpert. Ethan's wife dies in childbirth and his baby also does not survive.

=== After the crash ===
When Oceanic Flight 815 crashes on the island on September 22, 2004, Ethan is sent by his superior Ben Linus to pose as a fuselage survivor and make a list of the survivors. Ethan generally keeps to himself. He takes blood samples to determine if Claire is encountering pregnancy issues and goes on hunting trips with John Locke. When Hugo "Hurley" Reyes asks information of Ethan for a census, Ethan lies, saying his last name is "Rom" and that he is from Ontario. Knowing that he will be exposed before he can complete a list of the survivors, Ethan kidnaps Charlie Pace and the pregnant Claire Littleton for scientific research. Ethan finds the survivors' leader, Jack Shephard, following him and beats him up. He warns Jack that he will kill either Claire or Charlie if Jack continues to follow him. Charlie is later found hanging from a tree, and Jack is able to resuscitate him.

Ethan examines Claire in a Dharma Initiative station called The Staff. He asks her questions about her pregnancy and injects her with Juliet's serum. Ethan inserts a remote-activated implant that is later used to trigger nausea and bleeding. He drugs her and tries to convince her to give up her child to him and the Others, stating that they are "good people". During this segment, Ethan is accosted by Tom, who is visibly upset with Ethan for failing to complete his list, which seems to be very important to the Others. As Ethan is preparing to perform a Caesarean section on Claire, Alex frees her, and Ethan leads an unsuccessful search party.

Having lost Claire, Ethan attempts to get her back by telling Charlie he will kill one survivor for each night Claire is not returned to him. Scott Jackson is killed the next morning. The survivors assume he was killed by Ethan. The next day, Claire offers to use herself as bait to lure Ethan out of the jungle. When Ethan arrives to take Claire, Locke, Jack, Kate, Sayid, and Sawyer run in and tackle him down. Before they are able to extract any answers from him, Charlie shoots Ethan six times, killing him.

=== Alternate timeline ===
In the episode "What Kate Does", Ethan is shown to have survived the destruction of the Island and is a doctor in Los Angeles, under his real name, Ethan Goodspeed. His life in the absence of the island has not been elaborated upon.

== Casting ==
William Mapother did not audition for the part; he was chosen by co-creator/executive producer J. J. Abrams—who recognized him from the film, In the Bedroom—on September 22, 2004, the day that Lost premiered. Mapother was originally contracted for two episodes. His contract was extended to a total of four episodes in the first season. Mapother has since appeared in the flashbacks of five episodes throughout the second, third, and fifth seasons, for a total of ten episodes. Ethan also appears in the Lost: Missing Pieces mobisode titled "Jack, Meet Ethan. Ethan? Jack". As Mapother points out, Ethan has now appeared in more episodes after his death than he did when he was alive. Mapother described playing Ethan as "fun". The character's name is an anagram of "Other Man" and "More Than." Mapother is a fan of Lost and has never missed an episode. Devon Gearhart portrays Ethan as a child in "Dead Is Dead".

== Characterization ==
In the first season, Ethan was portrayed as a "brooding villain", "cold and evil" and "creepy" and after as a "swell, neighborly guy". Mapother felt that he was not evil and that Ethan had his reasons for acting the way that he did.

== Reception ==
IGN concluded that Ethan's death was the most frustrating on Lost because Ethan could have provided answers to the island's many mysteries.
