= Mark Bamford (film director) =

American film director and screenwriter

- Born: Louisville, Kentucky, United States
- Occupations: Film director, screenwriter
- Children: 2

Mark Bamford is an American film director and screenwriter.

Bamford was born in Louisville, Kentucky, but raised mostly in New York. He graduated from New York University in 1989 with a double major in French Literature and Linguistics and a minor in Anthropology. After working for several years in Los Angeles as a freelance screenwriter, Bamford wrote and directed the award-winning 2000 short film Hero, which won him the Atom Films "Director to Watch" Award in 2001. Hero aired in the United States on PBS. Cape of Good Hope (2004) is his only feature film.

Bamford was married to his co-writer and producer Suzanne Kay until they divorced in 2016. They have two children together. In 2004, Bamford and his family moved to Cape Town, South Africa. He currently lives in New York City. He is a Baháʼí.
