= Claire Littleton =

Fictional character of the TV series Lost

- Lost character
- Emilie de Ravin as Claire Littleton
- First appearance: "Pilot (Part 1)"
- Last appearance: "The End"
- Created by: Jeffrey Lieber; J. J. Abrams; Damon Lindelof
- Portrayed by: Emilie de Ravin
- Centric episode(s): Individual: "Raised by Another" "Maternity Leave" "Par Avion"; Shared: "The Last Recruit" "The End"

In-universe information
- Species: Human
- Gender: Female
- Occupation: Tattoo artist (formerly)
- Children: Aaron Littleton
- Relatives: Carole Littleton (mother); Christian Shephard (father); Jack Shephard (half-brother); Lindsey Littleton (aunt); Ray Shephard (grandfather)
- Nationality: Australian

Claire Littleton is a fictional character played by Emilie de Ravin on the ABC drama television series Lost, which chronicles the lives of the survivors of a plane crash in the South Pacific. Claire is introduced in the pilot episode as a pregnant crash survivor. She is a series regular until her disappearance in the fourth season finale. The character returned as a regular in the sixth season.

== Character biography ==
=== Before the Crash ===
Claire was raised in Sydney by her mother, Carole (Susan Duerden), who told her that her father had died. When she is a teenager, she and her mother are involved in a car accident which leaves Carole in a coma. Christian Shephard (John Terry) pays for Carole's medical care and reveals himself as Claire's father. When he suggests that Claire turn off her mother's life support, she is angry and leaves without learning his name. Years later, Claire becomes pregnant by her then-boyfriend, Thomas (Keir O'Donnell). He convinces her to keep the baby but leaves her a few months later. Claire considers giving the child up for adoption. She then visits a psychic, Richard Malkin (Nick Jameson), who insists she raise the child herself, because "danger surrounds this baby." Scared by his vehemence, Claire says she plans to have the baby adopted. Claire begins to sign the document to finalize the adoption, but the pen runs out of ink; the lawyer hands her another and it too fails to work. Before she tries a third pen, Claire changes her mind and leaves the room. She visits Malkin a second time, and he tells her about a couple living in Los Angeles who are interested in adopting her baby. He gives Claire a ticket for Oceanic Flight 815, which is to leave the next day, insisting it has to be that flight — and that flight only — that she must take. Weeks later, Claire believes Malkin foresaw the plane crash, meaning she would have to raise her child herself.

=== After the crash ===
==== Season 1 ====
Claire panics as she hasn't felt the baby move after the crash and is helped by Jack Shephard (Matthew Fox). She passes out from dehydration but when Jack tells them about some caves and a freshwater stream, Claire stays on the beach, claiming the move into the caves would be accepting their fate as long-term inhabitants.

She bonds with survivor Charlie Pace (Dominic Monaghan). They grow closer and Charlie persuades her to move to the caves, where Claire has nightmares. She insists someone is trying to interfere with or hurt her unborn child, but Jack insists her nightmares are stress-related and tries to give her sedatives. Annoyed, Claire leaves the caves with Charlie but returns, wanting Jack there when she gives birth. On the way back, she and Charlie are kidnapped by Ethan Rom (William Mapother). Charlie is rescued, but Claire remained missing for nearly two weeks. John Locke (Terry O'Quinn) and Boone Carlyle (Ian Somerhalder) find Claire when she returns to the caves, suffering from amnesia. Ethan, however, demands Claire is returned to him, saying he will kill one survivor a day until he gets her back. The survivors keep this from Claire but she notices them treating her differently, and eventually, when Claire demands an explanation, Shannon Rutherford (Maggie Grace) tells her about Ethan's threats. Against Charlie's wishes, Claire agrees to be bait to capture Ethan, and Charlie kills him. Later he tells Jack that he wasn't going to let Ethan anywhere near Claire again, and that he deserved to die.

Later, Locke seeks Claire's help in making a cradle for her baby as a birthday gift. Days later, Claire gives birth, assisted by Kate Austen (Evangeline Lilly), Jin-Soo Kwon (Daniel Dae Kim) and Charlie. Claire is initially unable to calm him but the Southern accent of James "Sawyer" Ford (Josh Holloway) solves the problem. Initially, Claire doesn't name the baby, but after Rousseau kidnaps him, she names him Aaron and begs Charlie and Sayid Jarrah (Naveen Andrews) to bring him back. She waits at the caves with Sun-Hwa Kwon (Yunjin Kim) and Shannon until Charlie and Sayid return with him.

==== Season 2 ====
Claire continues to struggle with her amnesia, and is annoyed by Charlie's attempts to play an almost fatherly role to Aaron. She unburdens herself to Locke, and jokes Charlie could be a religious freak with his Virgin Mary statues. The statues were found in the wreckage of a plane crash, each filled with heroin. Later, Claire is confronted by Mr. Eko (Adewale Akinnuoye-Agbaje), who tells her what was in the statues. Remembering Charlie mentioning his former drug addiction, she forbids him to approach her or Aaron. When Charlie steals Aaron, wanting to baptize him, Claire slaps him but later requests Eko baptize her and her son.

Later, Aaron falls ill, prompting Claire to seek Libby Smith's (Cynthia Watros) expertise to help her unblock her repressed memories in order to find a cure. Remembering where Ethan took her, she and Kate head into the jungle to search for Danielle Rousseau (Mira Furlan). They return to the Dharma station, but find it abandoned. Before leaving, Claire tells Rousseau her daughter, Alex (Tania Raymonde), helped her and is still alive. Upon returning to the beach, Aaron is well and Claire has recovered all the lost memories from after her abduction by Ethan. Charlie later approaches Claire, and gives her some vaccine for her and Aaron, which she accepts. While at Ana Lucia Cortez (Michelle Rodriguez) and Libby's funeral, Claire clasps Charlie's hand and later kisses him.

==== Season 3 ====
Days later, Claire sees a flock of gulls flying overhead. She believes if she can catch one, they could send a distress message to the outside world. She asks Sun and Jin to help build a net to catch one of the birds, but Desmond Hume (Henry Ian Cusick) thwarts their attempt when he scares the birds away with gunfire. Angry with him and Charlie, she follows Desmond to a rocky cliff, where he gives her a bird and learns of Desmond's visions of Charlie's death. She comforts Charlie, and the two attach a note to the bird before releasing it. Later, Claire suddenly falls violently ill, due to the now activated implant Ethan put in her during her abduction. Juliet Burke (Elizabeth Mitchell) cures the illness as a means of earning the survivors' trust.

When Naomi Dorrit (Marsha Thomason) addresses the camp about the world's perspective of their predicament, Claire expresses outrage they are considered dead. Later, when Karl (Blake Bashoff) arrives the next day with news of the Others' impending arrival, Claire goes with the rest of the camp to the radio tower. Soon after, Claire is delighted to hear Charlie has disabled the jamming device blocking all outgoing signals, but is worried he has not returned to shore.

==== Season 4 ====
Claire and Sun tend to Aaron before heading back to the beach, following Jack's success in contacting the freighter. However, upon the two groups meeting by the cockpit, Claire learns of Charlie's death and his final warning. With this in mind, Claire decides to join Locke and move into the barracks, along with Hurley, Sawyer and three other unarmed castaways. Along the way, she and the rest of Locke's group encounter Charlotte Lewis (Rebecca Mader), who had parachuted onto the island. Claire is asleep when the barracks fall under attack. One of Martin Keamy's (Kevin Durand) men shoots an RPG at Claire's house, which explodes, but she is rescued by Sawyer. Upon safely leaving the barracks and its attackers, Claire, Sawyer and Miles Straume (Ken Leung) return to the beach. Several times during the journey, Miles stares at Claire strangely, prompting Sawyer to issue an impromptu 'restraining order'. She falls asleep in their camp that night and wakes to find her father, Christian, holding Aaron, and proceeds to follow him, leaving Aaron under a tree in the process. Later, when Locke enters Jacob's cabin, he finds Claire sitting there with Christian, claiming she and Aaron are fine where they are. Before Locke leaves, Christian cautions him Claire's whereabouts should remain a secret.

Aaron is one of the rescued Oceanic Six, and the general public are told he is Kate's son, while Claire is listed as among the passengers who did not survive the plane crash. At Christian Shephard's memorial service, Carole Littleton, who has recovered from her coma, tells Jack she and Christian had a relationship which produced Claire, revealing her to be Jack's half-sister. Eventually, before departing to return to the island, Kate reveals to Carole that Aaron is Claire's son. Kate tells Carole that she is going back to try to find Claire, and leaves Aaron with his grandmother.

==== Season 6 ====
On the Island, Dogen (Hiroyuki Sanada) tells Jack that Claire has been consumed by the same "infection" that threatens Sayid. At about the same time, Jin is attacked by men from the temple, and then rescued by Claire, who has adapted to an existence on the Island like Rousseau's. She tells Jin about a friend she now has on the island, the fake John Locke — of whose falsity she is aware. Claire reveals that she's been searching for Aaron and believes the people in the Temple have him. Observing Claire's erratic behavior, Jin decides not to convince her otherwise. She therefore plans to invade the temple to find her son.

The Man in Black then sends Claire to the Temple as an emissary for him to communicate with the Others' leader, Dogen. However, Dogen orders the Others to take Claire captive, so they put her in a large pit within the Temple. When Kate returns, she demands to see Claire and finds her there, singing "Catch a Falling Star". Kate reveals to Claire that she took and raised Aaron, but Claire is not happy about it. After the Monster's attack on the Temple, the pair escape and join the Man in Black and his new group of defected Others.

As the Man in Black's party continues their journey, Claire attacks Kate. Their leader intervenes, stopping Claire violently. Claire later apologizes to Kate and thanks her for saving Aaron. Claire questions the Man in Black's intentions for her, expressing her fear that he doesn't need her to be on the plane on which he plans to escape. The Man in Black reassures her that he wants her to be reunited with her child. When asked about Kate, the Man in Black reveals that she is simply a means to an end. Claire later turns against and flees from the Man in Black after he allows Jin, Sun and Sayid to die on Charles Widmore's (Alan Dale) submarine. She becomes fearful of him and is hostile towards Richard Alpert (Nestor Carbonell), Miles and Frank Lapidus (Jeff Fahey) when she believes that they have been sent to kill her. They fail to convince her to accompany them off the Island as it collapses, owing to Desmond accidentally extinguishing the light in the source of the Island. When Kate and Sawyer arrive on Hydra Island and find her, Claire admits to shame of what she has become, and believes that Aaron is better off without her. Kate assures Claire that her worries are normal, and promises to help her. The trio board the plane with Richard, Frank and Miles and fly home.

=== Afterlife ===
Claire is the passenger in a taxi Kate Austen hijacks at gunpoint in order to escape Edward Mars (Fredric Lehne). When the driver runs from the taxi and Kate takes over as driver, she forces Claire to exit the vehicle and leave her belongings behind. Kate later regrets this and gives Claire a ride to the house of the couple who are adopting her baby. Claire asks Kate to come in with her, and finds out the couple has split up and the wife does not feel she can raise Claire's child alone. Claire then starts experiencing contractions and Kate brings her to the hospital, where she is treated by Dr. Goodspeed (Ethan Rom). He tells her at 36 weeks she could deliver a healthy baby; however, because she does not feel she is ready, she chooses to be treated with drugs stabilizing her. When the baby's heartbeat momentarily cannot be found, Claire instinctively calls her child "Aaron." In thanks for her assistance, Claire covers for Kate and gives her a credit card, enabling her to escape.

Later, Desmond uses their acquaintance from the plane to send Claire to his lawyer, Ilana Verdansky, for adoption advice, knowing that Verdansky is executing Christian Shephard's last will and testament and is already looking for Claire, a named beneficiary. Jack Shephard and his mother also learn of Claire's existence through the will. When Jack and Claire meet, he immediately accepts her as family and brings her to stay with him and his son David (Dylan Minnette).

Later on, Claire attends a concert with David. Desmond has brought Kate there, and Charlie's band Driveshaft is performing that night. Claire locks eyes with Charlie, and they both feel the first stirrings of recognition. She then goes into labour and gives birth backstage, being helped by Kate, just as before on the island. This reawakens Claire's and Kate's memories of the island. After this, Charlie also remembers their lives on the island, and he and Claire have an emotional reunion. They are later seen at the church with everybody else as Christian opens the doors and allows them to move on.

== Development ==
The producers thought it was essential an Australian was cast for the part of Claire, as it was always planned to be a multi-cultural show, and the Oceanic 815 was leaving from Sydney. Emilie de Ravin was working in Edmonton, so she was unable to go to the auditions, which were being held in Los Angeles. From a video she sent to the producers, they were able to tell de Ravin had the youth and sweetness required for the role, but also looked as though she had some life experience.

Emilie de Ravin, an Australian actress, originally auditioned for the role of Shannon, speaking her dialogue with an American accent. Instead, they offered her the part of Claire; she accepted without reading the script, assuming it would just be a recurring role. While de Ravin had never been pregnant, she was able to learn of the experience from her two older sisters. She found the hot weather conditions in Hawaii difficult, later saying that "in many ways, the filming is actually like the drama. You endure the muggiest weather in the rainforest... You're really exposed to the elements." The actress admitted being "creeped out" by the premise of "Raised by Another", in which a psychic tricks Claire by sending her to the island to raise her baby.

Emilie de Ravin did not return as a series regular for the fifth season, but had a "holding contract" and returned as a regular in the sixth season.
