= Christian Shephard =

Fictional character of the TV series Lost

- Lost character
- John Terry as Christian Shephard
- First appearance: "Walkabout"
- Last appearance: "The End"
- Created by: J. J. Abrams; Damon Lindelof
- Portrayed by: John Terry

In-universe information
- Full name: Dr. Christian Shephard
- Species: Human
- Gender: Male
- Occupation: Chief of surgery
- Spouse: Margo Shephard
- Children: Jack Shephard; Claire Littleton
- Relatives: Aaron Littleton (grandson)
- Nationality: American
- Former residence: California, United States

Dr. Christian Shephard is a fictional character on the ABC television series Lost played by John Terry. He is the father of lead characters Jack Shephard (Matthew Fox), who becomes the de facto leader of the survivors of Oceanic 815 after it crashes on an island, and Claire Littleton (Emilie de Ravin), another of the survivors on the Island. Christian died of an alcohol-induced heart attack days before the flight, leading to much of his story being told through flashbacks. In the fourth season and fifth season he is again featured on the Island several times, seemingly acting as a messenger for the leader of the Others, Jacob (Mark Pellegrino). In the sixth season, the Man in Black (Titus Welliver/Terry O'Quinn) admitted that he had "impersonated" Christian during the first week after the crash of Flight 815.

Christian is introduced in the fourth episode of the series, and goes on to feature in thirteen more, including a pivotal scene in the series finale, as well as two webisodes. He is an example of two of the main themes in Lost: father issues and character crossovers.

== Character biography ==
=== Before the crash ===
Initially, Christian is the chief of surgery at St. Sebastian Hospital. He is a recovering alcoholic. He marries Margo (Veronica Hamel), and the two have one child together, Jack. When Jack comes home following a bullying incident, Christian discourages Jack from trying to be heroic, saying that he "doesn't have what it takes." Years later, Christian meets Carole Littleton (Susan Duerden), a woman from Sydney, Australia. The two have a brief relationship before she returned to her home country, and later she gives birth to Christian's daughter, Claire (Emilie de Ravin). Christian would often fly over to visit, supporting the two the best he could. Carole and her sister, Lindsey (Gabrielle Fitzpatrick), do not approve of him juggling time between two families, which leads to Christian being told he is no longer allowed to visit.

Jack grows up to be a doctor, working at the same hospital as Christian. Christian tries to coach Jack on his poor bedside manner, most notably when Sarah (Julie Bowen) is brought in with severe injuries to her spine; he states that "false hope is still hope." Jack and Sarah grow close and eventually marry.

When he learns Carole has been in a car accident, Christian travels to Australia and pays for the medical treatment to keep her alive. While at the hospital, he introduces himself to Claire for the first time, much to Lindsay's resentment. Christian takes Claire out for coffee and tells her of his other family. Claire doesn't react well and walks out on him, so he returns to Los Angeles.

After Jack and Sarah's marriage fails, Jack finds Christian's number on her phone bill, and assumes he is the man Sarah was now seeing, confronting him at an AA meeting. After being assaulted, Christian slips back into alcoholism after being sober for fifty days. Later, Christian operates on a woman while under the influence, and is exposed by Jack, ending his career. At an airport bar, Christian meets Ana Lucia Cortez (Michelle Rodriguez). The two agree to travel to Australia together under different aliases; Ana Lucia names him "Tom", and Christian calls her "Sarah". Once in Australia, Christian asks Ana Lucia to serve as his bodyguard. The two drive to Lindsey's house, where he angrily demanded to see his daughter. After almost becoming violent, Christian is restrained and driven away. He is dropped off outside a bar, where he meets James "Sawyer" Ford (Josh Holloway). The two drink together, when Christian admits his mistakes, and that he isn't able to call his son and apologize.

Christian later suffers a severe heart attack and dies in an alley. His body is discovered and placed in a morgue, where he is identified by Jack. A funeral service was arranged back in LA, but Jack has trouble clearing Christian's coffin onto the doomed plane.

=== After the crash ===
After the plane crashes, Vincent, the dog that was on the plane, wanders through the jungle. Christian orders Vincent to go wake Jack, since there is work to do. The first few days on the island, Jack sees his father on the island and is certain that he's hallucinating from fatigue. Locke (Terry O'Quinn), a fellow crash survivor, refers to Jack's hallucinations as the "white rabbit" and convinces him to follow them. Jack does so and subsequently is led to a set of caves where he finds his father's coffin. Christian's body is nowhere to be found. Months later, when Hurley (Jorge Garcia) stumbles upon Jacob's cabin in the jungle he looks through the window and observes Christian in a rocking chair. Another person inside the cabin peeps through the window at Hurley, scaring him and causing him to run away.

When Claire wakes up one night while returning to the beach with Miles Straume (Ken Leung) and Sawyer, she sees Christian rocking his grandson, Aaron. Claire recognizes him as her father, and he then leads her into the jungle. Miles witnesses the encounter while Sawyer sleeps through it. Miles informs Sawyer of the encounter in the morning, and Sawyer finds Aaron lying on a nearby tree stump with Claire and Christian nowhere to be found. Locke encounters Christian acting as an intermediary for the invisible Jacob in his cabin. He tells Locke that the people from the freighter are already on their way back to the island and the only way to keep it safe is to have the island moved. Claire is also present, but Christian tells Locke to keep her whereabouts to himself.

On the freighter, now fated to explode thanks to a failsafe bomb Michael Dawson is keeping temporarily frozen, Christian appears to Michael moments before the C-4 explodes. He simply says, "You can go now, Michael." The bomb then explodes and Michael is killed.

Some time later, after Jack has escaped from the Island, he sees Christian late one night in the lobby of his hospital. Due to the sudden fright, Jack has a fellow doctor prescribe him medication to deal with the "hallucinations." Jack is continually visited by Christian, causing a mental breakdown.

Meanwhile, on the island, Christian once again appears to Locke as he is attempting to reach the wheel that Ben used to move the island. This encounter took place at a time where the ancient well that led to the wheel had not been built yet, and where the giant statue was still standing. Christian criticizes Locke for not moving the island himself, as per Christian's instructions. He also concurs with Richard Alpert's assessment that Locke would "have to die." Christian gives Locke additional instructions on what to do when he moves the wheel, including how to contact Eloise Hawking. Christian tells Locke to "say hello to [his] son" for him; though he doesn't give Locke a name, Locke deduces that Christian was referring to Jack and passes the message on, upsetting Jack.

In "Namaste", Christian appears to Sun and Lapidus after they have crashed on the island circa 2007 in the Barracks. He informs Sun that Jin is on the island, but that Jin is existing in 1977, and they have a long journey ahead of them. During this encounter, Christian's appearance was preceded by both the "Whispers" and by the Smoke Monster. When Sun and Lapidus tell Ben Linus that they were told to wait at the Barracks by Christian, Ben has an alarmed look on his face, but does not elaborate.

In the episode "The Last Recruit," the Man in Black reveals to Jack that he had been impersonating as his father in a similar way to how he now impersonates Locke and how he impersonated Mr. Eko's brother, Yemi, revealing that at least some, if not all of Christian's appearances on the island post-death were the Man in Black.

=== Afterlife ===
In the series finale, Jack meets Christian again in what is believed to be an alternate timeline in which Oceanic flight 815 never crashed, and in which many characters regain memories of their original island lives. However, in one of the show's final scenes, Jack encounters his father in a church, where he realizes that everyone in the "alternate timeline" is actually dead, in an afterlife constructed by the survivors in an unknown fashion so they could be with the people most important to them before "moving on" together. Jack finally makes amends with his father and, as the various characters seat themselves in the church pews, Christian exits through the front door, filling the room with a bright light.

== Characteristics ==
Whilst living, Christian is a quick tempered alcoholic. He is hard on his son, but is keen to be a better father to Jack than his father (Ray Shephard) was to him. A common theme throughout Lost is father issues. Jack's difficulties getting on with his father are the first instance of this, with many other characters such as Locke, Hurley and Kate also having difficult relationships with their dads. Christian further exemplifies this theme with his poor relationship with his daughter, Claire, where he was barely present in her upbringing. The connection between characters before the plane crash is another frequently occurring theme. Christian is present in flashbacks of Jack, Sawyer, Ana Lucia and Claire. Ben Rawson-Jones from Digital Spy describes Christian as "flawed character with both wisdom and regret".

After his death and reappearance on the island, Christian becomes a very mysterious figure, acting as a messenger for the even more mysterious Jacob. Christian is able to appear anywhere, both on and off the island, at will, and intervenes several times to stop Michael's suicide attempts. He was also able to defy time, in appearing to Locke at the bottom of what would someday be the Orchid Station, at a time when even the ancient well had not been built, the Statue was still standing, and before the original Christian had even died. Christian's posthumous appearances have prompted much speculation from critics. One reviewer calls Christian's appearance a vision. Erin Martell of TV Squad pondered that Christian's appearance is "like the Yemi apparition that turned into the Smoke Monster". Alan Sepinwall notes Christian holds Aaron, thus making him corporeal, but wondered about the significance of Miles seeing him.

In a review of the season finale he considers Christian "may be the walking dead". The first apparition of Christian had him wearing a clean suit, and having very well kept hair, whereas in his most recent apparition, Christian is wearing pants and a tattered looking shirt, as well as having stubble and untidy hair. This could suggest that he is alive in some sense, though it is unclear. Oscar Dahl commented "I still don't think that Jacob is Christian Shepherd [sic] or anything like that" Entertainment Weekly's Jeff Jensen calls him "Ghost Dad". Chris Carabott "expect[s] th[is] mystery will last until the final season". Lost producers Damon Lindelof and Carlton Cuse have confirmed Christian is dead, stating "In terms of actually physically corporally in existence... he's dead". They have also described Christian as one of three characters that are considered "undead", with Mr. Eko's brother Yemi and Kate's horse as the others. They elaborate that Yemi's post-death appearances are incarnations of the monster.

== Development ==
American John Terry previously appeared in ER, 24 and Las Vegas. His early appearances in Lost are mostly in flashbacks of various characters. He begins to feature more prominently on the island throughout the fourth season.

== Reception ==
Chris Carabott of IGN gave his highest rating, 9/10, to the webisode featuring Christian telling Vincent to wake Jack, describing it as "a shocking new look at ... Christian Shephard", whereas Oscar Dahl from BuddyTV found the presence of a "supposed-to-be-dead Christian" confusing. Christian's first appearance in Jacob's cabin gave Jeff Jensen of Entertainment Weekly "the chills". Digital Spy's Ben Rawson-Jones described it as "a pleasure" when Christian returned in the second half of season 4, adding "John Terry is superb".
