= John Terry (actor) =

American actor (born 1950)

- Born: January 25, 1950 (age 76); Vero Beach, Florida, U.S.
- Occupation: Actor
- Years active: 1978–2013
- Children: Hanna Terry

John Terry (born January 25, 1950) is an American retired film, television and stage actor. He is perhaps best known for his role as Christian Shephard in the TV series Lost, as Larry McCoy in the TV series Las Vegas and for portraying Slim in Of Mice and Men (1992). His daughter is professional association football player Hanna Terry.

== Early life ==
Terry was born in Vero Beach, Florida, where he attended Vero Beach High School. He was also educated at the prestigious Loomis Chaffee prep school in Windsor, Connecticut, and began a career building original custom log homes in North Carolina. He played roles in local theater before moving to Alaska where he founded a river rafting company. But his interest in acting did not diminish. At age 30 he moved to New York City and became a full-time actor.

== Career ==
Terry's debut role was as the title character in the 1980 fantasy film Hawk the Slayer, followed by roles in films such as There Goes the Bride (1980), Tuxedo Warrior (1982) and the action sequel Wild Geese II (1985), as Barbara Carrera's brother. His career then took a major upswing as he was assigned the roles of Lieutenant Lockhart in Stanley Kubrick's Full Metal Jacket (1987) and Felix Leiter in the James Bond film The Living Daylights (1987). Nothing as prominent followed immediately, though he received good notices for his role as a traumatized Vietnam veteran in Norman Jewison's In Country (1989). Terry subsequently played the lead in a well-regarded but short-lived TV series Against the Grain. Terry played Slim in the 1992 film adaptation of Of Mice and Men and also appeared in The Resurrected (1992), an adaption of the H. P. Lovecraft novella The Case of Charles Dexter Ward.

He found new success on television. He appeared in the first episodes of ER playing Dr. Div Cvetic, the love interest of Dr. Lewis, who disappeared after a nervous breakdown. He later played a recurring role in season two of Fox's real-time thriller 24, as Bob Warner, the father of both the love interest of hero Jack Bauer and of another daughter whose fiancé is suspected of being a terrorist.

After a brief stint on NBC's Las Vegas, he was cast as Christian Shephard, the father of Jack Shephard and Claire Littleton on ABC's Lost. Terry reprised his role as Shephard on several occasions in flashbacks before appearing frequently in real time on the island as an incarnation of "the man in black". He had a guest role in a 2006 episode of Law & Order, as well as the part of older Jacob Wheeler in Steven Spielberg's Into the West mini series, which was nominated for 16 Emmy Awards in 2006. He also appeared in David Fincher's Zodiac, Matthew McConaughey's Surfer, Dude, and the horror thriller Nine Dead.

== Filmography ==
=== Film ===
Year	Title	Role	Notes
1980	There Goes the Bride	Nicholas Babcock	
1980	Hawk the Slayer	Hawk	
1985	Wild Geese II	Michael	
1987	Full Metal Jacket	Lt. Lockhart	
1987	The Living Daylights	Felix Leiter	
1989	In Country	Tom	
1991	The Resurrected	John March	
1992	Of Mice and Men	Slim	
1993	A Dangerous Woman	Steve	
1994	Iron Will	Jack Stoneman	
1994	Reflections on a Crime	James	
1995	The Big Green	Edwin V. Douglas	
1998	Heartwood	Joe Orsini	
2007	Zodiac	Charles Thieriot	
2008	Surfer, Dude	Mercer Martin	
2009	The Way of War	Secretary of Defence	
2009	Nine Dead	Shooter	

=== Television ===
Year	Title	Role	Notes
1978	Forever Fernwood	Gerald McMahon	1 episode
1978	Soap	Foreman	1 episode
1979	Lou Grant	Dr. Lockwood	1 episode
1983	The Scarlet and the Black	Lt. Harry Barnett	Television film
1983	Philip Marlowe, Private Eye	George Dial	1 episode
1985	Dempsey and Makepeace	Arnold Sims	1 episode
1987	ScreenPlay	Shannon	1 episode
1990	A Killing in a Small Town	Stan Blankenship	Television film
1993	Miracle Child	Buck Sanders	Television film
1993	Against the Grain	Ed Clemons	Main role, 8 episodes
1994–1995	ER	Dr. David Cvetic	Recurring role, 8 episodes
1996	A Mother's Instinct	Carl Gibbins/Gilbaine	Television film
1996	Second Noah	Travis Beckett	1 episode
1998	Bad As I Wanna Be: The Dennis Rodman Story	James Rich	Television film
1998	A Change of Heart	Dr. Jim Marshall	Television film
1999	Blue Valley Songbird	Hank	Television film
2002–2003	24	Bob Warner	Recurring role, 12 episodes
2003–2004	Las Vegas	Larry McCoy	4 episodes
2004–2010	Lost	Dr. Christian Shephard	Recurring role, 19 episodes
2005	Dynasty: The Making of a Guilty Pleasure	Vince Peterson	Television film
2005	Into the West	Older Jacob Wheeler	Miniseries, 4 episodes
2007–2008	Wildfire	Jesse Ritter	Recurring role, 5 episodes
2006	Law & Order	Sherman Loomis	1 episode
2009	CSI: NY	McCanna Taylor	1 episode
2009	CSI: Miami	Dean Collins	1 episode
2009–2010	Trauma	Dr. Lyndon Carnahan	Recurring role, 7 episodes
2010–2011	Brothers & Sisters	Dr. Karl West	Recurring role, 5 episodes
2011	Charlie's Angels	Victor Sampson	2 episodes

Preceded by Bernie Casey non-Eon production	Felix Leiter actor 1987	Succeeded by David Hedison
