= William Mapother =

American actor (born 1965)

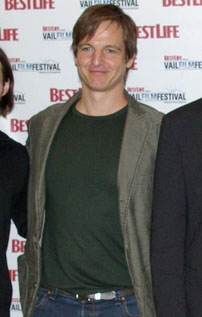
- Mapother in 2014
- Born: William Reibert Mapother Jr. April 17, 1965 (age 61); Louisville, Kentucky, U.S.
- Education: University of Notre Dame
- Occupation: Actor
- Years active: 1988–present
- Relatives: Tom Cruise (cousin)
- Website: williammapother.com

William Reibert Mapother Jr. (/ˈmeɪpɒθər/; born April 17, 1965) is an American actor, known for his role as Ethan Rom on the television series Lost and starring in the film In the Bedroom. He is also known for the film Another Earth.

== Early life and education ==
Mapother was born in Louisville, Kentucky, the son of Louisa (née Riehm) and William Reibert Mapother Sr. His father was an attorney and served as a judge in Louisville between 1967 and 1970. Mapother and Tom Cruise are first cousins; their fathers are brothers. Mapother graduated from St. Xavier High School and the University of Notre Dame.

== Career ==
Mapother has become widely known as a character actor, and sometimes plays scary or otherwise dark characters. He played a pivotal role in Todd Field's In the Bedroom, and is perhaps best known as Ethan Rom in the TV show Lost, which he played for 11 episodes during the life of the series.

Mapother has also had considerable roles in a series of independent films, such as The Lather Effect, Moola, Hurt, and Another Earth. Mapother starred in The Burrowers as a Native American fighter who joins a posse to help find missing white settlers.

In September 2007, he was elected to a three-year term on the National Board of Directors for the Screen Actors Guild.

He has provided the motion capture work for Agent 47, the main character in the 2012 video game Hitman: Absolution and also provided the voice before series veteran David Bateson was recast. In 2014, he played the lead in the paranormal horror film The Atticus Institute.

== Awards ==
William Mapother received a nomination for a Gotham Award for the film In the Bedroom in 2001.

== Filmography ==
=== Film ===
Year	Title	Role	Notes
1989	Born on the Fourth of July	Platoon Member – Vietnam	
1998	Without Limits	Bob Peters	
1998	Trickle	Josh Riddell	
1998	The Unknown Cyclist	By-Stander	
1999	Magnolia	WDKK Show Director's Assistant	
2000	Mission: Impossible 2	Wallis	
2000	Almost Famous	Bartender	Scenes deleted
2001	In the Bedroom	Richard Strout	
2001	Swordfish	Gabriel's Crew	
2002	Minority Report	Hotel Clerk	
2002	Self Storage	Graham	
2003	The Kiss	Peter	
2004	Suspect Zero	Bill Grieves	
2004	The Grudge	Matthew Williams	
2005	Lords of Dogtown	Donnie	
2005	The Zodiac	Dale Coverling	
2005	Chloe	Doctor	
2006	Ask The Dust	Bill	
2006	The Lather Effect	Jack	
2006	World Trade Center	Jason Thomas	
2007	Moola	Bob	
2007	Moving McAllister	Bob	
2008	The Burrowers	Will Parcher	
2008	Hurt	Darryl Coltrane	
2010	A Warrior's Heart	David Milligan	
2011	Another Earth	John Burroughs	
2011	Citizen Gangster	Detective Rhys	
2012	FDR: American Badass!	Dr. Ellington	
2013	Underdogs	Bill Burkett	
2014	I Origins	Darryl	
2015	The Atticus Institute	Dr. Henry West	
2015	Blackhat	Rich Donahue	
2016	Tell Me How I Die	Dr. Jerrems	
2024	Outlaw Posse	Angel	
2026	The Leader	Reverend Applewhite	

=== Television ===
Year	Title	Role	Notes
2002	CSI: Crime Scene Investigation	Douglas Sampson	Episode: "Snuff"
2002	The Pennsylvania Miners' Story	John 'Flathead' Phillippi	TV movie
2002	Touched by an Angel	Eddie	2 episodes
2003	Law & Order: Special Victims Unit	Luke Edmunds	Episode: "Rotten"
2004	Line of Fire	Larry	2 episodes
2004	CSI: Miami	Pete Keller	Episode: 'Lost Son"
2004	NCIS	Kyle Grayson	Episode: "See No Evil"
2004	Crossing Jordan	Henry Bishop	Episode: "Death Goes On"
2004–2010	Lost	Ethan Rom	11 episodes
2005	The Inside	Ronald Ewing	Episode: "Skin and Bone"
2005	Threshold	Gunneson	2 episodes
2006	Robot Chicken	Alien Bully / Leprechaun #2	2 episodes
2007	K-Ville	Gordon Wix	Episode: "Pilot"
2007	Viva Laughlin	Sweet Lenny Collins	Episode: "What a Whale Wants"
2007	WordGirl	Guy Rich (voice)	Episode: "The Young and the Meatless/Mr. Big's Colossal Mini-Golf"
2008	Skip Tracer	Henry Hargrove Jr.	TV movie
2008	Lost: Missing Pieces	Ethan Rom	Episode: "Jack, Meet Ethan. Ethan? Jack."
2008	Criminal Minds	Ian Corbin	Episode: "Paradise"
2009	Prison Break	FBI Agent Chris Franco	2 episodes
2010	Human Target	Sam Fisher	Episode "Sanctuary"
2010	I Heart Vampires	William	2 episodes
2010	Law & Order: Criminal Intent	John Silvestri	Episode: "Love on Ice"
2011–2014	The Mentalist	Richard Haibach	4 episodes
2012	Burn Notice	Garret Hartley	Episode: "Shock Wave"
2012	Justified	Delroy Baker	2 episodes
2012	American Horror Story	Misogynist Driver	Episode: "Dark Cousin"
2013	Mad Men	Randall Walsh	Episode: "The Flood"
2013	Castle	Carl Matthews	Episode: "The Disciple"
2014	Hawaii Five-0	Eric Porter	Episode: "Ka Makuakaneka"
2015	Constantine	Jacob Shaw	Episode: "A Whole World Out There"
2015	Grimm	Dwight Eleazar	Episode: "The Believer"
2016	Supergirl	Rudy Jones / The Parasite	Episode: "Changing"
2017	MacGyver	Daniel Horn	Episode: "Hole Puncher"
2018	The Blacklist	Bill	Episode: "Ruin"
2020	9-1-1: Lone Star	Bruce Ackerman	Episode: "Monster Inside"
2021	FBI Most Wanted	Travis Russel	Episode: "Winner"

=== Video games ===
Year	Title	Role	Notes
2010	Fallout: New Vegas	Colonel James Hsu	
2012	Hitman: Absolution	Agent 47	Motion capture
2016	Hitman	Dino Bosco	

== See also ==
- List of people from the Louisville metropolitan area
