= YoungStar Award =

Former American film award

- Awarded for: Excellence of young performers in film, television, stage, and music.
- Country: United States of America
- Presented by: The Hollywood Reporter
- First award: 1995
- Final award: 2000

The YoungStar Awards, presented by The Hollywood Reporter, honored young American actors and actresses from ages 6–18 in their work in film, television, stage and music. Winners were chosen via a poll of 3,500 entertainment industry insiders who read The Hollywood Reporter. The awards ceremony was held from 1995 until 2000; there was no ceremony in 1996.

== First Annual YoungStar Awards ==
The First Annual YoungStar Awards were held in 1995.

=== Best Performance by a Young Actor in a Comedy Film ===
- Joseph Gordon-Levitt as Roger Bomman, Angels in the Outfield - Won
- Joaquin Phoenix as Jimmy Emmett, To Die For
- Macaulay Culkin as Richie, Richie Rich
- Thomas Ian Nicholas as Calvin Fuller, A Kid in King Arthur's Court
- Eric Lloyd as Charlie, The Santa Clause

=== Best Performance by a Young Actress in a Comedy film ===
- Christina Ricci as Kat, Casper- Won
- Alicia Silverstone as Cher, Clueless
- Reese Witherspoon as Wendy, S.F.W.
- Brittany Ashton Holmes as Darla, The Little Rascals
- Eliza Dushku as Emma, Bye Bye Love

=== Best Performance by a Young Actress in a Drama Film ===
- Kirsten Dunst as Claudia, Interview with the Vampire -Won
- Natalie Portman as Matilda, Leon (1994 film)
- Liesel Pritzker Simmons as Sara, A Little Princess (1995 film)
- Angelina Jolie as Kate, Hackers (film)
- Kate Winslet as Juliet, Heavenly Creatures

=== Best Performance by a Young Actor in a Drama Film ===
- Brad Renfro as Erick, The Cure - Won
- Elijah Wood as Stu Simmons, The War
- Mark-Paul Gosselaar as D.J., Twisted Love (1995)
- Leonardo DiCaprio as Jimmy Carrol, The Basketball Diaries (film)
- Joseph Mazzello as Roarke, The River Wild

=== Best Young Actor in a Comedy TV Series ===
- Jonathan Taylor Thomas as Randy Taylor, Home Improvement - Won
- Benjamin Salisbury as Brighton Sheffield, The Nanny
- Mark-Paul Gosselaar as Zack Morris, Saved by the Bell: The College Years
- Joey Lawrence as Joey Russo, Blossom (American TV series)
- Rider Strong as Eric Matthews, Boy Meets World

=== Best Young Actress in a Comedy TV Series ===
- Madeline Zima as Grace Sheffield, The Nanny - Won
- Nicholle Tom as Maggie Sheffield, The Nanny
- Mayim Bialik as Blossom Russo, Blossom (American TV series)
- Melissa Joan Hart as Clarissa, Clarissa Explains It All
- Jodie Sweetin as Stephanie, Full House

=== Best Performance by a Young Actor in a Drama TV Series ===
- Joey Zimmerman as Ulysses Adair, Earth 2 (TV series)- Won
- Adam Wylie as Zachary, Picket Fences
- Breckin Meyer as Mike, The Home Court
- Devon Gummersall as Brian, My So-Called Life
- Merlin Santana as Marcus, Under One Roof (1995 TV series)

=== Best Performance by a Young Actress in a Drama TV Series ===
- Lacey Chabert as Claudia Salinger, Party of Five- Won
- J. Madison Wright Morris as True, Earth 2 (TV series)
- Vinessa Shaw as Cassidy, McKenna (TV series)
- Lisa Wilhoit as Danielle, My So-Called Life
- Haylie Johnson as Becky, Dr. Quinn, Medicine Woman

=== Best Performance by a Young Actor in a Miniseries/Made-for-TV Movie ===
- Joseph Gordon-Levitt as Matt Cunningham, The Great Elephant Escape - Won
- Mark-Paul Gosselaar as Zack Morris, Saved by the Bell: Wedding in Las Vegas
- Mario Lopez as A.C. Slater, Saved by the Bell: Wedding in Las Vegas
- Ryan Phillippe as Tom Readman, Deadly Invasion: The Killer Bee Nightmare
- Jonathan Brandis as Prince Wenceslas, Good King Wenceslas

=== Best Performance by a Young Actress in a Miniseries/Made-for-TV Movie ===
- Tiffani Thiessen as Kelly Kapowski, Saved by the Bell: Wedding in Las Vegas - Won
- Hilary Swank as Patty, Cries Unheard: The Donna Yaklich Story
- Mara Wilson as Barbara, A Time to Heal (film)
- Kellie Martin as Angela Delvecchio, Death of a Cheerleader
- Elisabeth Moss as Anna, Escape to Witch Mountain (1995 film)

=== Best Young Ensemble Cast - Television ===
- Saved by the Bell: The College Years Cast - Won
- Boy Meets World Cast
- Full House Cast
- Home Improvement (TV series) Cast
- The Nanny Cast

=== Best Young Voice Over Talent ===
- Christian Bale as Thomas, Pocahontas (1995 film) - Won
- Jonathan Taylor Thomas as Simba, The Lion King
- John Morris (voice actor) as Andy, Toy Story
- Benjamin Diskin as Junior, Problem Child (TV series)
- Bradley Pierce as Miles 'Tails' Prower, Sonic the Hedgehog (TV series)

== Second Annual YoungStar Awards ==
The Second Annual YoungStar Awards were held in 1997.

Winners are in bold.

=== Best Young Actor in a Comedy Film ===
- **Alex D. Linz** as Sammy, One Fine Day
- Brad Renfro as Huckleberry "Huck" Finn, Tom and Huck
- Jonathan Taylor Thomas as Thomas "Tom" Sawyer, Tom and Huck
- Elijah Wood as Sandy Ricks, Flipper
- Adam Zolotin as Louie Durante, Jack

=== Best Young Actress in a Comedy Film ===
- **Mara Wilson** as Matilda Wormwood, Matilda
- Rachael Leigh Cook as Becky Thatcher, Tom and Huck
- Gaby Hoffmann as Lane Dandridge, Everyone Says I Love You
- Natalie Portman as Laura Dandridge, Everyone Says I Love You
- Mae Whitman as Maggie Taylor, One Fine Day

=== Best Young Actor in a Comedy TV Series ===
- **Joseph Gordon-Levitt** as Tommy Solomon, 3rd Rock from the Sun
- Michael Fishman as D.J. Conner, Roseanne
- Marcus T. Paulk as Myles Mitchell, Moesha
- Benjamin Salisbury as Brighton Sheffield, The Nanny
- Jonathan Taylor Thomas as Randy Taylor, Home Improvement

=== Best Young Actress in a Comedy TV Series ===
- **Tatyana Ali** as Ashley Banks, The Fresh Prince of Bel-Air
- Kaitlin Cullum as Libby, Grace Under Fire
- Melissa Joan Hart as Sabrina Spellman, Sabrina, the Teenage Witch
- Brandy Norwood as Moesha Mitchell, Moesha
- Madeline Zima as Grace Sheffield, The Nanny

=== Best Young Actor in a Drama Film ===
- **Lucas Black** as Frank Wheatley, Sling Blade
- Jonathan Lipnicki as Ray Boyd, Jerry Maguire
- Joseph Gordon-Levitt as Oliver Laird, The Juror
- Joseph Perrino as Young Lorenzo "Shakes" Carcaterra, Sleepers
- Brad Renfro as Young Michael Sullivan, Sleepers

=== Best Young Actress in a Drama Film ===
- **Claire Danes** as Juliet, Romeo + Juliet
- Rae'Ven Larrymore Kelly as Tonya Hailey, A Time to Kill
- Anna Paquin as Amy Alden, Fly Away Home
- Natalie Portman as Lauren Gustafson, Heat
- Liv Tyler as Lucy Harmon, Stealing Beauty

=== Best Young Actor in a Drama TV Series ===
- **Adam Wylie** as Zach, Picket Fences
- Lucas Black as Caleb Temple, American Gothic
- David Gallagher as Simon Camden, 7th Heaven
- Cirroc Lofton as Jake Sisko, Star Trek: Deep Space Nine
- Ryan Merriman as Young Jarod, The Pretender
- Michael Yarmush as Arthur Read, Arthur (TV series)

=== Best Young Actress in a Drama TV Series ===
- **Lacey Chabert** as Claudia, Party of Five
- Jessica Bowman as Colleen Cooper, Dr. Quinn, Medicine Woman
- Kirsten Dunst as Charlie Chiemingo, ER
- Ashley Johnson as Katherine 'Kate' Moloney, Moloney
- Jennifer Love Hewitt as Sarah Reeves Merrin, Party of Five

=== Best Young Actor in a Daytime TV Program ===
- **Jonathan Jackson** as Lucky Spencer, General Hospital
- Justin Cooper as Lucas Jones, General Hospital
- Steven Hartman as Rick Forrester, The Bold and the Beautiful
- Tommy J. Michaels as Tim Dillon, All My Children
- Nicholas Pappone as Phillip Chancellor IV, The Young and the Restless

=== Best Young Actress in a Daytime TV Program ===
- Kimberly McCullough as Robin Scorpio, General Hospital
- **Kimberly J. Brown** as Marah Lewis, Guiding Light
- Gina Gallagher as Bianca Montgomery, All My Children
- Erin Torpey as Jessica Buchanan, One Life to Live
- Ashley Williams as Danielle Andropoulos, As the World Turns

=== Best Young Actor in a Mini-Series/Made for TV Film ===
- **Haley Joel Osment** as Davis, Last Stand at Saber River
- Fred Savage as Bobby Tennison, No One Would Tell (1996 film)
- Bug Hall as Eddie Munster, The Munsters' Scary Little Christmas
- Mark-Paul Gosselaar as Scott, She Cried No
- Ryan Reynolds as Bobby Rupp, In Cold Blood (miniseries)
- Erik von Detten as Billy Jackson, Christmas Every Day

=== Best Young Actress in a Mini-Series/Made for TV Film ===
- **Kirsten Dunst** as Sara, The Siege at Ruby Ridge
- Hedy Burress as Linda Barrows, If These Walls Could Talk
- Ashley Johnson as Annie Warbucks, Annie: A Royal Adventure!
- Jena Malone as Ruth Anne 'Bone' Boatwright, Bastard Out of Carolina
- Candace Cameron Bure as Melissa Connell, She Cried No
- Nicholle Tom as Amy Dustin, For My Daughter's Honor

=== Best Young Actor in a Saturday Morning TV Program ===
- **Luke Tarsitano** as Fudge, Fudge
- Michael Galeota as Bailey Kipper, Bailey Kipper's P.O.V.
- Ben Gould as Nicky Farina, Saved by the Bell: The New Class
- Richard Lee Jackson as Ryan Parker, Saved by the Bell: The New Class
- Kyle Labine as Evan Ross, Goosebumps

=== Best Young Actress in a Saturday Morning TV Program ===
- **Megan Parlen** as Mary Beth Pepperton, Hang Time
- Samantha Esteban as Maria, Saved by the Bell: The New Class
- Shannon Chandler as Josephine "Jo" McCormick, Big Bad Beetleborgs
- Sarah Lancaster as Rachel Meyers, Saved by the Bell: The New Class
- Elizabeth Lund as Heather, Big Bad Beetleborgs

=== Best Young Recording Artist ===
- **LeAnn Rimes**, Blue

== Third Annual YoungStar Awards ==
The Third Annual YoungStar Awards were held on November 8, 1998 at Universal Studios. The awards were hosted by Malcolm-Jamal Warner.

Winners are in bold.

=== Best Young Actor in a Comedy Film ===
- Cameron Finley as Beaver, Leave it to Beaver
- **Jesse James** as Spencer, As Good as It Gets
- Alex D. Linz as Alex Pruitt, Home Alone 3
- Gregory Smith as Alan, Small Soldiers
- Kevin Zegers as Josh, Air Bud

=== Best Young Actress in a Comedy Film ===
- Hallie Eisenberg as Marie, Paulie
- Hatty Jones as Madeline, Madeline
- Lindsay Lohan as Hallie & Ann, The Parent Trap
- **Christina Ricci** as Dede Truitt, The Opposite of Sex
- Mara Wilson as Anabel, A Simple Wish

=== Best Young Actor in a Comedy TV Series ===
- **Joseph Gordon-Levitt** as Tommy Solomon, 3rd Rock from the Sun
- Brandon Hammond as Matty, The Gregory Hines Show
- Jonathan Lipnicki as Alex, Meego
- Tahj Mowry as T.J. Henderson, Smart Guy
- Ben Savage as Cory Matthews, Boy Meets World
- Jonathan Taylor Thomas as Randy Taylor, Home Improvement

=== Best Young Actress in a Comedy TV Series ===
- Kaitlin Cullum as Libby, Grace Under Fire
- **Danielle Fishel as Topanga Lawrence, Boy Meets World**
- Larisa Oleynik as Alex, The Secret World of Alex Mack
- Madylin Sweeten as Ally, Everybody Loves Raymond
- Emily Mae Young as Lilly, Step by Step

=== Best Young Actor in a Drama Film ===
- Cameron Finley as Travis, Hope Floats
- Brandon Hammond as Ahmad Chadway, Soul Food
- Eamonn Owens as Francie, The Butcher Boy
- Jamyang Jamtsho Wangchuk as Dalai Lama, Seven Years in Tibet
- **Elijah Wood** as Leo, Deep Impact

=== Best Young Actress in a Drama Film ===
- Meagan Good as Cisely Batiste, Eve's Bayou
- **Scarlett Johansson** as Grace, The Horse Whisperer
- Christina Ricci as Wendy, The Ice Storm
- Jurnee Smollett as Eve Batiste, Eve's Bayou
- Mae Whitman as Bernice, Hope Floats

=== Best Young Actor in a Drama TV Series ===
- Andrew and Steven Cavarno as Owen, Party of Five
- **David Gallagher** as Simon Camden, 7th Heaven
- George O. Gore II as Gregory "G" Williams, New York Undercover
- Ross Malinger as Roland, Party of Five
- Austin O'Brien as Joshua Greene, Promised Land
- Michael Yarmush as Eric, My Life as a Dog

=== Best Young Actress in a Drama TV Series ===
- Jessica Biel as Mary Camden, 7th Heaven
- **Lacey Chabert** as Claudia, Party of Five
- Erika Christensen as Romy, Nothing Sacred
- Beverley Mitchell as Lucy Camden, 7th Heaven
- Caitlin Wachs as Chloe, Profiler
- Michelle Williams as Jen Lindley, Dawson's Creek

=== Best Young Actor in a Daytime TV Program ===
- **Jonathan Jackson** as Lucky Spencer, General Hospital
- Sean Marquette as Jamie Martin, All My Children
- Nicholas Pappone as Phillip Chancellor IV, The Young and the Restless
- Tyrone Savage as young Isaac Newton, The Inventor Specials: Newton
- Jeffery Wood as Jimmy Harrison, Sunset Beach

=== Best Young Actress in a Daytime TV Program ===
- Jessica Alba as Maya Graham, Flipper
- Camryn Grimes as Cassie Newman, The Young and the Restless
- Alexas Manta as Amanda, As the World Turns
- **Robyn Richards** as Maxie Jones, General Hospital
- Erin Torpey as Jessica Buchanan, One Life to Live

=== Best Young Actor in a Mini-Series/Made for TV Film ===
- Seth Adkins as Robbie, ...First Do No Harm
- Zachery Ty Bryan as John Scaduto, Principal Takes a Holiday
- Matthew Lawrence as Jesse, Angels in the Endzone
- Frankie Muniz as young Sammy, What the Deaf Man Heard
- **Elijah Wood** as the Artful Dodger, Oliver Twist

=== Best Young Actress in a Mini-Series/Made for TV Film ===
- **Kirsten Dunst** as Tina, Fifteen and Pregnant
- Tina Majorino as Avocet Abigail, Before Women Had Wings
- Jena Malone as Lily, Hope
- Chaz Monet as Ruby, Ruby Bridges

=== Best Young Actor in a Saturday Morning TV Program ===
- **Ben Gould** as Nicky Farina, Saved by the Bell: The New Class
- Phillip Van Dyke as Ned, 20,000 Leagues Under the Sea
- Scott Whyte as Chris, City Guys

=== Best Young Actress in a Saturday Morning TV Program ===
- **Samantha Esteban** as Maria, Saved by the Bell: The New Class
- Erica Luttrell as Emilie Robeson, The New Ghostwriter Mysteries
- Lindsey McKeon as Katie Peterson, Saved by the Bell: The New Class
- Megan Parlen as Mary Beth Pepperton, Hang Time
- Charlotte Sullivan as Camella Gorik, The New Ghostwriter Mysteries

=== Best Young Recording Artist or Musical Group ===
- Hanson, Middle of Nowhere
- Jonny Lang, Jonny Lang in Concert
- Monica, The Boy Is Mine
- LeAnn Rimes, LeAnn Rimes in Concert
- Usher, Usher

== Fourth Annual YoungStar Awards ==
The Fourth Annual YoungStar Awards were held on November 7, 1999 at Universal Studios' Panasonic Theatre. The awards were hosted by Melissa Joan Hart and Donny Osmond. Proceeds benefited APLA's Skills for Teen AIDS Risk Reduction (S.T.A.R.R.) Program.

The show included a musical performance by Renee Olstead.

Winners are in bold.

=== Best Young Actor in a Comedy Film ===
- Dylan and Cole Sprouse as Julian, Big Daddy
- Eli Marienthal as Ricky Abramowitz, Slums of Beverly Hills
- Joseph Gordon-Levitt as Cameron, 10 Things I Hate About You
- **Jason Schwartzman** as Max Fisher, Rushmore
- Mason Gamble as Dirk, Rushmore

=== Best Young Actress in a Comedy Film ===
- **Rachael Leigh Cook** as Laney Boggs, She's All That
- Jessica Campbell as Tammy Metzler, Election
- Larisa Oleynik as Bianca Stratford, 10 Things I Hate About You
- Julia Stiles as Katarina, 10 Things I Hate About You
- Leelee Sobieski as Aldys, Never Been Kissed

=== Best Young Actor in a Comedy TV Series ===
- **Zachery Ty Bryan** as Brad Taylor, Home Improvement
- Benjamin Salisbury as Brighton Sheffield, The Nanny
- Michael Galeota as Nick, The Jersey
- Eric Lloyd as Little John, Jesse
- Justin Berfield as Ross, Unhappily Ever After

=== Best Young Actress in a Comedy TV Series ===
- Madeline Zima as Grace Sheffield, The Nanny
- Madylin Sweeten as Ally, Everybody Loves Raymond
- Larisa Oleynik as Alissa Strudwick, 3rd Rock from the Sun
- **Mila Kunis** as Jackie Burkhart, That '70s Show
- Azura Skye as Jane, Zoe, Duncan, Jack and Jane

=== Best Young Actor in a Drama Film ===
- Jonathan Jackson as Vincent, The Deep End of the Ocean
- **Joseph Mazzello** as John, Simon Birch
- Jake Gyllenhaal as Homer Hickman, October Sky
- Chris Owen as Quentin, October Sky
- Jake Lloyd as Anakin Skywalker, Star Wars: Episode I – The Phantom Menace
- Ryan Merriman as Sam, The Deep End of the Ocean

=== Best Young Actress in a Drama Film ===
- **Jena Malone** as Anna, Stepmom
- Natalie Portman as Queen Amidala, Star Wars: Episode I – The Phantom Menace
- Anna Paquin as Alison, A Walk on the Moon
- Heather Matarazzo as Grace O'Shea, 54
- Mika Boorem as Natalie, Jack Frost

=== Best Young Actor in a Drama TV Series ===
- Austin O'Brien as Joshua Greene, Promised Land
- **Robert Iler** as Anthony Soprano, Jr., The Sopranos
- Ryan Merriman as Young Jarod, The Pretender
- Marcus T. Paulk as Myles Mitchell, Moesha
- David Gallagher as Simon Camden, 7th Heaven

=== Best Young Actress in a Drama TV Series ===
- Mae Whitman as Sara, Chicago Hope
- Lacey Chabert as Claudia, Party of Five
- **Jamie Lynn Sigler** as Meadow Soprano, The Sopranos
- Sarah Rayne as Lexy Logan, Legacy
- Michelle Williams as Jen Lindley, Dawson's Creek

=== Best Young Actor in a Daytime TV Program ===
- **Jonathan Jackson** as Lucky Spencer, General Hospital
- Logan O'Brien as Lucas Jones, General Hospital
- Nicholas Pappone as Phillip Chancellor IV, The Young and the Restless
- Craig Lawlor as Adam Hughes, As the World Turns
- Joseph Cross as Casey Hughes, As the World Turns

=== Best Young Actress in a Daytime TV Program ===
- **Amber Tamblyn** as Emily Quartermaine, General Hospital
- Carly Schroeder as Serena Baldwin, Port Charles
- Erin Torpey as Jessica Buchanan, One Life to Live
- Ashley Cafagna as Kimberly Fairchild, The Bold and the Beautiful

=== Best Young Actor in a Mini-Series/Made for TV Film ===
- Adam Wylie as Jack, Michael Landon, the Father I Knew
- Adam Wylie as Charles, Balloon Farm
- **Haley Joel Osment** as Bobby, Cab to Canada
- Andrew Ducote as Brandon, Judgement Day: The Ellie Nesler Story
- Phillip Van Dyke as Luke, Halloweentown
- Ryan Merriman as Ben, Smart House

=== Best Young Actress in a Mini-Series/Made for TV Film ===
- **Leelee Sobieski** as Joan of Arc, Joan of Arc
- Evan Rachel Wood as Robin Garr, Down Will Come Baby
- Raven-Symoné as Nebula, Zenon: Girl of the 21st Century
- Tina Majorino as Alice, Alice in Wonderland
- Dominique Swain as Lolita, Lolita

=== Best Young Actor in a Saturday Morning TV Program ===
- **Brandon Baker** as Cray Blake, One World
- Tom Wade Huntington as Tony, Saved by the Bell: The New Class

=== Best Young Actress in a Saturday Morning TV Program ===
- Alisa Reyes as Marci Blake, One World
- Ashley Cafagna as Liz Miller, Saved by the Bell: The New Class
- **Lindsey McKeon** as Katie Peterson, Saved by the Bell: The New Class
- Megan Parlen as Mary Beth Pepperton, Hang Time

=== Best Young Recording Artist or Musical Group ===
- Hanson, Live from Albertane
- **Britney Spears**, ...Baby One More Time (album)
- Christina Aguilera, Christina Aguilera (album)
- Jonny Lang, Wander This World

=== Best Performance in a Voice Over Talent ===
- Rickey D'Shon Collins, voice of Vince, Recess
- Mae Whitman, voice of Little Susie, Johnny Bravo
- Adam Wylie, voice of Louis, The King and I
- Sam Gifaldi, various voices, Hey Arnold!
- **Myles Jeffrey**, voice of Easy, Babe: Pig in the City
- Michael Yarmush, the original voice of **Arthur Read**

== Fifth Annual YoungStar Awards ==
The Fifth Annual YoungStar Awards were held on November 19, 2000 at the Wilshire Theatre in Beverly Hills. A celebratory dinner followed the event at Le Meridian Hotel. The event was produced by Dick Clark, Robert J. Dowling, Dawn Allen, Al Schwartz and Ken Shapiro. The awards were hosted by Mo'Nique, and presenters included B.B. Good, Amanda Bynes, Jane Kaczmarek, Bryan Cranston, and Michelle Trachtenberg. There were performances by No Authority, Rachael Lampa, Youth Asylum and Alecia Elliott. A portion of the proceeds went to the Starlight Children's Foundation.

Winners are listed in bold.

=== Best Young Actor in a Comedy Film ===
- **Jonathan Lipnicki** as George Little, Stuart Little
- Spencer Breslin as Rusty Duritz, Disney's The Kid
- Sam Huntington as Jeremiah 'Jam' Bruce, Detroit Rock City
- Malcolm Stumpf as Sam, The Next Best Thing
- Mark Webber as Hal Brandston, Snow Day

=== Best Young Actress in a Comedy Film ===
- Kirsten Dunst as Betsy Jobs, Dick
- **Natalie Portman** as Novalee Nation, Where the Heart Is
- Hallie Eisenberg as Young Little Miss Amanda Martin, Bicentennial Man
- Michelle Trachtenberg as Penny, Inspector Gadget
- Mara Wilson as Lily Stone, Thomas and the Magic Railroad

=== Best Young Actor in a Comedy TV Series ===
- **Frankie Muniz** as Malcolm, Malcolm in the Middle
- John Francis Daley as Sam Weir, Freaks and Geeks
- Shia LaBeouf as Louis Anthony Stevens, Even Stevens
- Taran Noah Smith as Mark, Home Improvement (TV series)
- Eric Lloyd as Little John, Jesse

=== Best Young Actress in a Comedy TV Series ===
- Amanda Bynes, The Amanda Show
- **Mila Kunis** as Jackie Burkhart, That '70s Show
- Danielle Fishel as Topanga Lawrence, Boy Meets World
- Sarah Hagan as Millie Kentner, Freaks and Geeks
- Alexa Vega as Wendy Stiles, Ladies Man

=== Best Young Actor in a Drama Film ===
- Frankie Muniz as Willie Morris, My Dog Skip
- **Haley Joel Osment** as Cole Sear, The Sixth Sense
- Michael Angarano as Nick, Music of the Heart
- Lucas Black as Peter Joseph Bullis, Crazy in Alabama
- Trevor Morgan as Nathan Martin, The Patriot

=== Best Young Actress in a Drama Film ===
- Kirsten Dunst as Lux Lisbon, The Virgin Suicides
- **Thora Birch** as Jane Burnham, American Beauty
- Kimberly J. Brown as Ava Walker, Tumbleweeds
- Jena Malone as Heather Aubrey, For Love of the Game
- Anne Suzuki as Young Hatsue Imada, Snow Falling on Cedars

=== Best Young Actor in a Drama TV Series ===
- **Robert Iler** as Anthony Soprano, Jr., The Sopranos
- Vincent Berry as Atticus Finch Henderson, Manhattan, AZ
- David Gallagher as Simon Camden, 7th Heaven
- Eric Lively as Carey Bell, So Weird
- Ryan Merriman as Young Jarod, The Pretender

=== Best Young Actress in a Drama TV Series ===
- Heather Matarazzo as Heather Wiseman, Now and Again
- **Jamie Lynn Sigler** as Meadow Soprano, The Sopranos
- Lacey Chabert as Claudia, Party of Five
- Cara DeLizia as Fiona 'Fi' Phillips, So Weird
- Evan Rachel Wood as Jessie Sammler, Once and Again

=== Best Young Actor in a Daytime TV Program ===
- **Josh Ryan Evans** as Timmy Lenox, Passions
- Jonathan Jackson as Lucky Spencer, General Hospital
- Billy Kay as Shayne Lewis, Guiding Light
- Justin Torkildsen as Rick Forrester, The Bold and the Beautiful
- Paul Wesley as Max Nickerson, Guiding Light

=== Best Young Actress in a Daytime TV Program ===
- **Amber Tamblyn** as Emily Quartermaine, General Hospital
- Ashley Tesoro as Kimberly Fairchild, The Bold and the Beautiful
- Camryn Grimes as Cassie Newman, The Young and the Restless
- Hayden Panettiere as Lizzie Spaulding, Guiding Light
- Mary Elizabeth Winstead as Jessica Bennett, Passions

=== Best Young Actor in a Mini-Series/Made for TV Film ===
- **Seth Adkins** as Pinocchio, Geppetto
- Blake Heron as Matt Kur, Cheaters
- Shawn Pyfrom as Danny Bonaduce, Come On Get Happy: The Partridge Family Story
- Will Rothhaar as Kip, An American Daughter
- Michal Suchánek as Danny Thorell, Aftershock: Earthquake in New York

=== Best Young Actress in a Mini-Series/Made for TV Film ===
- **Alicia Morton** as Annie, Annie
- Kaitlin Cullum as Eve Plumb, Growing Up Brady
- Kaley Cuoco as Maureen McCormick, Growing Up Brady
- Rae'Ven Larrymore Kelly as Dora Charles, Freedom Song
- Emily Mae Young, Santa and Pete

=== Best Young Actor in a Saturday Morning TV Program ===
- **Ben Gould** as Nicky Farina, Saved by the Bell: The New Class
- Brandon Baker as Cray Blake, One World
- Jon Lee, Miami 7

=== Best Young Actress in a Saturday Morning TV Program ===
- **Alisa Reyes** as Marci Blake, One World
- Lindsey McKeon as Katie Peterson, Saved by the Bell: The New Class
- Ashley Tesoro as Liz Miller, Saved by the Bell: The New Class

=== Best Young Recording Artist or Musical Group ===
- **Charlotte Church**, Voice of an Angel
- Billy Gilman, One Voice
- Hoku, Hoku
- Rachael Lampa, Live For You
- Mandy Moore, I Wanna Be With You

=== Best Performance in a Voice Over Talent ===
- **Eli Marienthal**, voice of Hogarth Hughes, The Iron Giant
- Lacey Chabert, voice of Eliza Thornberry, The Wild Thornberrys
- Spencer Klein, voice of Arnold, Hey Arnold!
- Hayden Panettiere, voice of Suri, Dinosaur
- Francesca Smith, voice of Helga Pataki, Hey Arnold!

=== Best Television Ensemble Cast ===
- **Frankie Muniz**, Justin Berfield, Erik Per Sullivan, Christopher Masterson and Craig Lamar Traylor, Malcolm in the Middle
- David Gallagher, Jessica Biel, Beverley Mitchell and Mackenzie Rosman, 7th Heaven
- Patrick Levis, Eric Lively, Cara DeLizia and Erik von Detten, So Weird
- Cameron Richardson, Antoinette Picatto and Michael Angarano, Cover Me
- John Francis Daley, Samm Levine, Martin Starr, Natasha Melnick and Sarah Hagan, Freaks and Geeks

=== Best Stage Performance by a Young Actor ===
- **Bix Bettwy** as Boy in Shakespeare's Henry V at San Diego's Old Globe Theatre

=== Best Stage Performance by a Young Actress ===
- **Emily Hong** as multiple roles in Broken Hearts at Los Angeles' Cornerstone Theater

=== YoungStar Starlight Award ===
- **Christina Aguilera**
