= 7th Blockbuster Entertainment Awards =

- Sponsored by: Blockbuster LLC
- Date: April 10, 2001
- Location: Shrine Auditorium
- Country: USA
- Presented by: Blockbuster Awards

Highlights
- Family Favorite Film: Chicken Run
- Favorite CD: No Strings Attached
- Favorite Video Game: Driver 2: The Wheelman Is Back

Television/radio coverage
- Network: Fox
- Viewership: 4.5 million
- Produced by: Angela Fairhurst; Michael Levitt
- Directed by: Bruce Gowers

The 7th Blockbuster Entertainment Awards were held on April 10, 2001 at the Shrine Auditorium in Los Angeles. This was the final Blockbuster Entertainment Awards ceremony. Below is a complete list of nominees and winners. Winners are highlighted in bold.

== Film ==
=== Favorite Actor - Drama ===
- **Mel Gibson**, The Patriot
- George Clooney, The Perfect Storm
- Tom Hanks, Cast Away
- Denzel Washington, Remember the Titans
- Michael Douglas, Traffic

=== Favorite Actor - Drama/Romance ===
- **Ben Affleck**, Bounce
- Kevin Spacey, Pay it Forward
- Will Smith, The Legend of Bagger Vance
- Billy Crudup, Almost Famous
- Matt Damon, All the Pretty Horses

=== Favorite Actor - Comedy/Romance ===
- **Nicolas Cage**, The Family Man
- Jim Carrey, Me, Myself & Irene
- Robert de Niro, Meet the Parents
- Ben Stiller, Meet the Parents
- Mel Gibson, What Women Want

=== Favorite Actor - Comedy ===
- **Jim Carrey**, How the Grinch Stole Christmas
- Martin Lawrence, Big Momma's House
- Eddie Murphy, Nutty Professor II: The Klumps
- Marlon Wayans, Scary Movie
- Shawn Wayans, Scary Movie

=== Favorite Actor - Horror ===
- **David Arquette**, Scream 3
- Devon Sawa, Final Destination
- Vin Diesel, Pitch Black

=== Favorite Actor - Action ===
- **Russell Crowe**, Gladiator
- Nicolas Cage, Gone in Sixty Seconds
- Tom Cruise, Mission: Impossible 2
- Samuel L. Jackson, Shaft
- Matthew McConaughey, U-571

=== Favorite Actor - Suspense ===
- **Harrison Ford**, What Lies Beneath
- Dennis Quaid, Frequency
- Russell Crowe, Proof of Life
- Samuel L. Jackson, Unbreakable
- Bruce Willis, Unbreakable

=== Favorite Actor - Science Fiction ===
- **Kevin Bacon**, Hollow Man
- Patrick Stewart, X-Men
- Vince Vaughn, The Cell

=== Favorite Actress - Drama ===
- **Julia Roberts**, Erin Brockovich
- Joan Allen, The Contender
- Kate Winslet, Quills

=== Favorite Actress - Drama/Romance ===
- **Gwyneth Paltrow**, Bounce
- Penélope Cruz, All the Pretty Horses
- Charlize Theron, The Legend of Bagger Vance
- Helen Hunt, Pay It Forward

=== Favorite Actress - Comedy/Romance ===
- **Helen Hunt**, What Women Want
- Téa Leoni, The Family Man
- Jenna Elfman, Keeping the Faith
- Renée Zellweger, Me, Myself & Irene

=== Favorite Actress - Comedy ===
- **Sandra Bullock**, Miss Congeniality
- Kirsten Dunst, Bring It On
- Janet Jackson, Nutty Professor II: The Klumps
- Nia Long, Big Momma's House

=== Favorite Actress - Horror ===
- **Neve Campbell**, Scream 3
- Ali Larter, Final Destination
- Courteney Cox, Scream 3

=== Favorite Actress - Suspense ===
- **Michelle Pfeiffer**, What Lies Beneath
- Kim Basinger, Bless the Child
- Meg Ryan, Proof of Life

=== Favorite Actress - Science Fiction ===
- **Jennifer Lopez**, The Cell
- Anna Paquin, X-Men
- Elisabeth Shue, Hollow Man

=== Favorite Actress - Action ===
- **Angelina Jolie**, Gone in Sixty Seconds
- Robin Tunney, Vertical Limit
- Vanessa Williams, Shaft

=== Favorite Supporting Actor - Comedy/Romance ===
- **Jack Black**, High Fidelity
- Michael Bowman, Me, Myself & Irene
- Don Cheadle, The Family Man
- Michael Clarke Duncan, The Whole Nine Yards
- Mark Feuerstein, What Women Want

=== Favorite Supporting Actor - Drama/Romance ===
- **Haley Joel Osment**, Pay It Forward
- Philip Seymour Hoffman, Almost Famous
- Jason Lee, Almost Famous

=== Favorite Supporting Actor - Action ===
- **Bill Murray**, Charlie's Angels
- Djimon Hounsou, Gladiator
- Harvey Keitel, U-571

=== Favorite Supporting Actor - Suspense ===
- **Andre Braugher**, Frequency
- David Caruso, Proof of Life
- Spencer Treat Clark, Unbreakable

=== Favorite Supporting Actor - Drama ===
- **Benicio Del Toro**, Traffic
- Albert Finney, Erin Brockovich
- Wood Harris, Remember the Titans
- Mark Wahlberg, The Perfect Storm

=== Favorite Supporting Actor - Science Fiction ===
- **James Marsden**, X-Men
- Vincent D'Onofrio, The Cell
- Josh Brolin, Hollow Man

=== Favorite Supporting Actor - Comedy ===
- **Benjamin Bratt**, Miss Congeniality
- Paul Giamatti, Big Momma's House
- Tom Green, Road Trip
- Jeffrey Tambor, How the Grinch Stole Christmas
- Owen Wilson, Meet the Parents

=== Favorite Supporting Actress - Comedy/Romance ===
- **Maria Bello**, Coyote Ugly
- Amanda Peet, The Whole Nine Yards
- Marisa Tomei, What Women Want

=== Favorite Supporting Actress - Suspense ===
- **Christina Ricci**, Bless the Child
- Pamela Reed, Proof of Life
- Robin Wright, Unbreakable
- Diana Scarwid, What Lies Beneath

=== Favorite Supporting Actress - Science Fiction ===
- **Rebecca Romijn**, X-Men
- Kim Dickens, Hollow Man
- Famke Janssen, X-Men

=== Favorite Supporting Actress - Drama/Romance ===
- **Frances McDormand**, Almost Famous
- Fairuza Balk, Almost Famous
- Caroline Aaron, Bounce

=== Favorite Supporting Actress - Comedy ===
- **Cheri Oteri**, Scary Movie
- Christine Baranski, How the Grinch Stole Christmas
- Molly Shannon, How the Grinch Stole Christmas
- Blythe Danner, Meet the Parents
- Candice Bergen, Miss Congeniality

=== Favorite Supporting Actress - Drama ===
- **Helen Hunt**, Cast Away
- Marg Helgenberger, Erin Brockovich
- Diane Lane, The Perfect Storm
- Catherine Zeta-Jones, Traffic

=== Favorite Supporting Actress - Action ===
- **Lucy Liu**, Shanghai Noon
- Connie Nielsen, Gladiator
- Toni Collette, Shaft

=== Favorite Action Team ===
- **Drew Barrymore, Cameron Diaz, Lucy Liu**, Charlie's Angels
- Jackie Chan, Owen Wilson, Shanghai Noon
- Clint Eastwood, James Garner, Tommy Lee Jones, Donald Sutherland, Space Cowboys
- Yun-Fat Chow, Michelle Yeoh, Crouching Tiger, Hidden Dragon

=== Favorite Male - Newcomer ===
- **Heath Ledger**, The Patriot
- Patrick Fugit, Almost Famous
- Jim Caviezel, Frequency
- Hugh Jackman, X-Men

=== Favorite Female - Newcomer ===
- **Kate Hudson**, Almost Famous
- Taylor Momsen, How the Grinch Stole Christmas
- Thandie Newton, Mission: Impossible 2
- Piper Perabo, Coyote Ugly
- Teri Polo, Meet the Parents

=== Favorite Villain ===
- **Joaquin Phoenix**, Gladiator
- Dougray Scott, Mission: Impossible 2
- Jason Isaacs, The Patriot
- Ian McKellen, X-Men

=== Favorite Family Film ===
- **Chicken Run**
- Dinosaur
- Rugrats in Paris: The Movie
- The Emperor's New Groove

=== World Artist Award ===
- **Warren Beatty**

== Music ==
=== Favorite Female Artist of the Year ===
- **Christina Aguilera**, Christina Aguilera
- Toni Braxton, The Heat
- Faith Hill, Breathe
- Madonna, Music
- Britney Spears, Oops!... I Did It Again

=== Favorite Male Artist of the Year ===
- **Eminem**, The Marshall Mathers LP
- Dr. Dre, Dr. Dre 2001
- Ricky Martin, Sound Loaded
- Kid Rock, The History of Rock
- Sting, Brand New Day

=== Favorite Group of the Year ===
- **Destiny's Child**, The Writing's on the Wall
- Backstreet Boys, Black & Blue
- Creed, Human Clay
- 'NSYNC, No Strings Attached
- Santana, Supernatural

=== Favorite Artist — Rap ===
- **Eminem**, The Marshall Mathers LP
- DMX, ... And Then There Was X
- Dr. Dre, Dr. Dre 2001
- Jay-Z, The Dynasty: Roc La Familia
- Outkast, Stankonia

=== Favorite Female Artist — Country ===
- **Faith Hill**, Breathe
- Reba McEntire, So Good Together
- Jo Dee Messina, Burn
- Lee Ann Womack, I Hope You Dance

=== Favorite Male Artist — Country ===
- **Tim McGraw**, Greatest Hits
- Kenny Chesney, Greatest Hits
- Toby Keith, How Do You Like Me Now
- George Strait, Latest Greatest Straitest Hits

=== Favorite Duo or Group — Country ===
- **Dixie Chicks**, Fly
- Lonestar, Lonely Grill
- SheDaisy, The Whole SHeBANG

=== Favorite Female Artist — R&B ===
- **Toni Braxton**, Heat
- Whitney Houston, Whitney: The Greatest Hits
- Sade, Lovers Rock

=== Favorite Male Artist — R&B ===
- **Joe**, My Name Is Joe
- D'Angelo, Voodoo
- R. Kelly, TP-2.com

=== Favorite Group — R&B ===
- **Destiny's Child**, The Writing's on the Wall
- Jagged Edge, J.E. Heartbreak
- Next, Welcome II Nextasy

=== Favorite Artist — Rock ===
- **Lenny Kravitz**, Greatest Hits
- Don Henley, Inside Job
- Kid Rock, The History of Rock
- Sting, Brand New Day

=== Favorite Group — Rock ===
- **Limp Bizkit**, Chocolate Starfish and the Hot Dog Flavored Water
- Bon Jovi, Crush
- Creed, Human Clay
- Red Hot Chili Peppers, Californication
- Santana, Supernatural

=== Favorite Female — New Artist ===
- **Pink**, Can't Take Me Home
- Dido, No Angel
- Macy Gray, On How Life Is
- Mandy Moore, So Real and I Wanna Be With You
- Jessica Simpson, Sweet Kisses

=== Favorite Male — New Artist ===
- **Nelly**, Country Grammar
- Billy Gilman, One Voice
- Sisqó, Unleash the Dragon

=== Favorite Group — New Artist ===
- **3 Doors Down**, The Better Life
- Baha Men, Who Let the Dogs Out
- Papa Roach, Infest

=== Favorite CD ===
- **'NSYNC**, **No Strings Attached**
- Creed, Human Clay
- Eminem, The Marshall Mathers LP
- Santana, Supernatural
- Britney Spears, Oops! ... I Did It Again

=== Favorite Artist — Latino ===
- **Christina Aguilera**, Mi Reflejo
- Marc Anthony, Desde un Principio: From the Beginning
- Gloria Estefan, Alma Caribeña
- Ricky Martin, Sound Loaded
- Shakira, MTV Unplugged

=== Favorite Group — Latino ===
- **Son by Four**, Son by Four
- A.B. Quintanilla y Los Kumbia Kings, Amor, Familia y Respeto
- Los Temerarios, En La Madrugada Se Fue

=== Favorite Single ===
- **NSYNC, "Bye Bye Bye"**
- Creed, "Higher"
- Destiny's Child, "Say My Name"
- Faith Hill, "Breathe"
- Madonna, "Music"

=== Favorite Soundtrack ===
- **Charlie's Angels**
- Coyote Ugly
- Mission: Impossible 2
- Nutty Professor II: The Klumps
- Romeo Must Die

=== Favorite Song From a Movie ===
- **LeAnn Rimes**, **"Can't Fight the Moonlight"** (Coyote Ugly)
- Destiny's Child, "Independent Woman Part 1" (Charlie's Angels)
- Janet Jackson, "Doesn't Really Matter" (Nutty Professor II: The Klumps)
- Marc Anthony, "You Sang to Me" (Runaway Bride)
- Hoku, "Another Dumb Blonde" (Snow Day)

=== Favorite Female Artist — Pop ===
- **Britney Spears**, Oops! ... I Did It Again
- Christina Aguilera, Christina Aguilera
- Celine Dion, All the Way... A Decade of Song
- Faith Hill, Breathe
- Madonna, Music

=== Favorite Male Artist — Pop ===
- **Ricky Martin**, Sound Loaded
- Marc Anthony, Marc Anthony
- Enrique Iglesias, Enrique
- Lenny Kravitz, Greatest Hits
- Sting, Brand New Day

=== Favorite Group — Pop ===
- **'NSYNC**, No Strings Attached
- 98 Degrees, Revelation
- Backstreet Boys, Black & Blue
- Destiny's Child, The Writing's on the Wall
- Savage Garden, Affirmation

== Video games ==
=== Favorite Video Game ===
- **Driver 2: The Wheelman Is Back**

=== Favorite PlayStation Game ===
- **Tony Hawk's Pro Skater 2**

=== Favorite PlayStation 2 Game ===
- **Madden NFL 2001**

=== Favorite N64 Game ===
- **Mario Party 2**

=== Favorite Dreamcast Game ===
- **Tony Hawk's Pro Skater 2**

=== Favorite Game Boy Game ===
- **Tony Hawk's Pro Skater 2**
