= List of The Bold and the Beautiful characters introduced in the 1990s =

The Bold and the Beautiful is a long-running American soap opera which has aired on CBS Daytime since March 23, 1987, and is the most-watched soap opera worldwide.

The following section comprises past and current characters that have appeared on the show that debuted between 1990 and 1999.

== Julie Delorean ==
Julie Delorea was portrayed by Jane A. Rogers from 1990 to 1992.

== Ben Maclaine ==
Ben Maclaine was portrayed by John Brandon from 1990 to 1991.

== Helen Maclaine ==
Helen Maclaine was portrayed by actress Tippi Hedren from 1990 to 1991.

== Charlie Maclaine ==
Charlie Maclaine was portrayed by Chuck Walling from 1990 to 1991.

== Jake Maclaine ==
Jake Maclaine was portrayed by Todd McKee from 1990 to 1992. The character returned to the show from 2007 to 2013, and again from 2015 to 2016, last appearing on November 28, 2016. He also reappeared from November 8, 2018. He then appeared in 3 episode between November 6–15, 2019.

Jake was introduced as the brother of Margo Maclaine Lynley (Lauren Koslow).

== Pierre Jourdan ==
Pierre Jourdan was portrayed by Robert Clary from 1990 to 1992.

== Blake Hayes ==
Blake Hayes was portrayed by Peter Brown from 1991 to 1992.

== C. J. Garrison ==
C. J. Garrison
- The Bold and the Beautiful character
- Portrayed by: Michelle Heap (1991); Tyler and Jacob DeHaven (1991–93); Taylor Joseph Robinson (1993–94); Kevin and Christopher Graves (1994–95); Kyle Sabihy (1995–97); Mick Cain (1997–2017)
- Duration: 1991–2004; 2007; 2010; 2017
- First appearance: October 29, 1991
- Last appearance: September 13, 2017
- Created by: William J. Bell
In-universe information
- Other names: Clarke Garrison, Jr.
- Occupation: Owner of Insomnia Café chain
- Parents: Clarke Garrison; Sally Spectra
- Half-brothers: Mark MacClaine
- Half-sisters: Macy Alexander; Darla Einstein (adoptive)
- Spouse: Becky Moore
- Aunts: Shirley Spectra
- Nieces: Alexandria Forrester
- Other relatives: Sally Spectra; Coco Spectra

C. J. Garrison is a fictional character in the American soap opera The Bold and the Beautiful, portrayed by Mick Cain from December 1997 to January 2001, July 2002 to August 2003, returning briefly in 2004, 2007, 2010 and 2017. Speaking about his 2010 return, which aired on December 21 and 22 of that year, Cain told CBS Soaps In Depth "It's funny — every time I think I've seen the last of C.J., Bradley Bell gives me a call with a little something for me. It's such a cool thing to jump back in there and see everyone".

Clarke Jr. was born to Sally Spectra (played by Darlene Conley) and Clarke Garrison (Daniel McVicar). Not long after C.J.'s birth, Clarke left town. C.J. grew into a disobedient child in his early teens, having a cynical view on the world and starting a food fight with Brooke Logan Forrester (Katherine Kelly Lang) and Eric Forrester's (John McCook) son, Rick, who was close to C.J.'s age. His father returned in 1996 and C.J. was initially resentful of Clarke until Clarke rescued him from kidnappers.

In December 1997, C.J. and Rick (Jacob Young) were closer to friends than enemies. They both pursued Rick's babysitter, seductress Amber Moore (Adrienne Frantz), which led to a drag race that nearly killed Rick. CJ spent most of 1998 and 1999 as Amber's shoulder to cry on as she became pregnant and married Rick. He also developed a crush on Kimberly Fairchild (Ashley Tesoro). They went on a few dates but she was more interested in Rick (now Justin Torkildsen).

Around this time, Forrester Creations and Spectra Fashions were in a heated conflict over the latest fashion show. C.J. planned to sabotage the model wearing Forrester's final outfit of the night, the showstopper. Unbeknownst to him, this was Kimberly. The lower half of her dress was ripped off by a nail, leaving her in her panties in front of dozens of the press. C.J. was guilt-ridden, but the truth never came out.

Amber was in the middle of a very complicated web of lies about the paternity of her son. The baby's natural mother, her cousin Becky Moore (Marissa Tait), had just arrived in town. To keep her busy, Amber set her up with C.J. On that first date, they made out, but it never amounted to anything.

Months later, Becky had shed her white trash roots for a makeover, as well as getting her son back from Amber, C.J. spent a great deal of time with her. They fell in love quickly, their relationship helping C.J. make the final transition from wisecracking boy to mature, thoughtful man. Unfortunately, Becky was dying of pancreatic cancer. Amber tried to keep the cancer a secret from Becky and everyone else, but broke down and eventually told C.J. Instead of telling her, he proposed marriage, wanting to make her final weeks happy. Becky learned of her cancer minutes before the wedding, but married CJ anyway. She died soon after, at peace, surrounded by her family and friends. Becky wanted C.J. to raise her son, Eric Jr., with Amber. C.J. and Amber shared an apartment. Around this time, C.J.'s sister Macy (Bobbie Eakes) died in a car explosion; he blamed Thorne for her death. Macy left her brother her coffee house, Insomnia.

Shortly after Macy's death, Amber had a party at their apartment and she and C.J. were mistakenly arrested for drug possession. Child Protective Services took the baby away, letting the child live with Rick. The Forresters got a court order to force Amber and Eric Jr. to move moved in with them. Amber persuaded them to let C.J. move in as well. C.J. won temporary custody, allowing the three to move back to their old apartment. He and Amber made plans to marry, since he had fallen in love with her and she admitted to having feelings for him.

The Forresters were desperate to stop the wedding so Rick could be with Amber and raise Eric Jr. They managed to track down Deacon Sharpe (Sean Kanan), Eric Jr.'s biological father, who then interrupted the ceremony to announce that Eric Jr. was his son.

While C.J. believed he and Amber still had a future together, Rick and Stephanie (Susan Flannery) repeatedly urged Amber to realize her best chance for custody was with Rick, that she still had feelings for Rick. Finally, a few weeks later, Amber agreed to move back in with Rick. She told C.J. before a surprise romantic dinner he'd planned for them at Insomnia. C.J. was devastated. With Eric Jr. already being fought over by two fathers, C.J. was forgotten about, and immediately faded into the background.

C.J. came back to town in Spring 2002, with a huge chip on his shoulder for everyone, especially the Forresters. He also began running the coffee shop, Insomnia, again. He was very mean to Bridget Forrester (then played by Jennifer Finnigan), his old friend, when she came into Insomnia looking for a job. Bridget eventually wore C.J. down until he became nice to her and he eventually offered her a place to stay, in the apartment right next to his.

Bridget and C.J. began dating, but not seriously. CJ was very supportive when Bridget started pre-med training. It was there she met Dr. Mark MacClaine (Michael Dietz), her med school mentor. C.J. immediately became jealous of Mark, sensing that Mark had intentions regarding Bridget. After a few months, Mark resigned as Bridget's mentor and began to date her. C.J. was furious to learn from Clarke that Mark was his long-lost half brother.

C.J. again faded into the background, returning briefly in 2004 for his friend Darla's (Schae Harrison) wedding in June and to lend some relationship advice to old friend Amber Moore in September.

In February 2007, C.J. returned to Los Angeles to MC a karaoke night at his café Insomnia and visit his mother Sally, who was not well. Evidently by that time he had resolved his differences with Rick (now played by Kyle Lowder), as the two were friendly toward one another. Later that year, C.J. and his father Clarke, assisted Sally sell Spectra Fashions to Jacqueline Marone. It was revealed that the company now running Spectra had filed for bankruptcy and the title had reverted to Sally, who was now living in France, not wishing to return to Los Angeles. Jackie renamed the company "M. Fashions", hiring Clarke as head designer and returning it to a knock-off firm.

In December 2010, C.J. returns to L.A., revealing that he now resides in San Francisco. C.J. had returned to close down his Insomnia café as the distance from San Francisco to Los Angeles was proving difficult. He stated his mother was sailing around the Caribbean Islands with a number of body builders and there was no longer reason for him to visit Los Angeles. Stephanie Forrester purchased Insomnia from C.J. and asked friend Dayzee Leigh if she'd like to run the café and offer employment to the homeless.

In February 2017, C.J. returns to L.A., revealing that he bought Spectra Fashions back from Jackie Marone at some point between 2012 and 2017. Wanting to sell his family's company to publishing billionaire Bill Spencer, Jr., C.J. is persuaded by his younger cousin, namesake Sally Spectra, to allow her to revive the business. C.J. was unhappy when the new Sally took a page out of his mother's playbooks, and had stolen designs from Forrester Creations. C.J. continues to refuse offers from Bill to sell the building to him.

== Adam Banks ==
Adam Banks is a homeless man who formed a friendship with Stephanie Forrester. He was portrayed by Rod Loomis from 1991 to 1992.

== Zachary "Zach" Hamilton ==
Zachary "Zach" Hamilton was portrayed by Michael Watson in 1992. He aired from May 22, 1992 (episode 1294) to December 9, 1992 (episode 1434).

Zach is introduced as a man with a past connection to Taylor Hayes (Hunter Tylo), who is later revealed to be his sister.

== Sly Donovan ==
Irving "Sly" Donovan was portrayed by Brent Jasmer from May 28, 1992 (episode 1298) to October 16, 1996 (episode 2399).

Sly is introduced as a bartender at a new Malibu hotspot that was opened up by The Beach Club and as a friend to Zach Hamilton.

== Jay Garvin ==
Jay Garvin was portrayed by Brett Stimely from September 21, 1992 (episode 1378) to June 3, 1994 (episode 1809).

Jay is introduced as a psychiatrist who works in the same building as Taylor Forrester (Hunter Tylo) and is recommended by her to Sheila Carter (Kimberlin Brown) when Sheila requests counseling. Jay was killed off during a struggle with Sheila, which resulted in him falling off a balcony.

== Keith Anderson ==
Keith Anderson was portrayed by Ken LaRon on a recurring basis from January 8, 1993 (episode 1454) to April 6, 1995 (episode 2011).

Keith is introduced as a bartender who works for Sly Donovan at The Bikini Bar.

== Mike Guthrie ==
Mike Guthrie was portrayed by Ken Hanes from January 18, 1993 (episode 1460) to 1998. The character returned to the show in 2010 and 2022. Guthrie reprised the role beginning January 4, 2023. He returned later again that year, with Hanes revealing in that he was anxious about what was "coming next", saying, "Coming back, you know, it's been exactly that same thing: just great, great fun."

== Steve Crown ==
Steve Crown was portrayed by Perry Stephens from April 9, 1993 (episode 1516) to July 12, 1993 (episode 1582).

Steve is introduced as a patent attorney hired by Forrester Creations to handle the legal affairs for a patent application of the BeLieF formula developed by Brooke Logan.

== Connor Davis ==
Connor Davis was portrayed by Scott Thompson Baker from April 19, 1993 (episode 1522) to 1998. The character returned to the show from 2000 to 2002 and 2005.

== Kevin Anderson ==
Kevin Anderson was portrayed by Keith Jones on a recurring basis from May 12, 1993 (episode 1539) to April 6, 1995 (episode 2011).

Kevin is introduced as the mentally disabled younger brother of Keith Anderson seeking employment at The Bikini Bar with Keith's help.

== James Warwick ==
Dr. James Warwick
- The Bold and the Beautiful character
- Portrayed by: Ian Buchanan
- Duration: 1993–99, 2004, 2007–11, 2017
- First appearance: September 30, 1993
- Last appearance: August 29, 2017
- Created by: Bradley Bell
- Introduced by: William J. Bell; Lee Phillip Bell
- Crossover appearances: The Young and the Restless
In-universe information
- Occupation: Psychiatrist
- Parents: Damon Warwick; Mary Warwick
- Wife: Maggie Forrester (1996–97); Sheila Carter (1997–98)
- Daughters: Mary Carter Warwick

James Warwick was portrayed by Ian Buchanan from September 30, 1993 (episode 1638) to 1999, followed by recurring appearances during 2004, between 2007 and 2011 and in 2017. His character also appeared on The Young and the Restless in crossover events on February 24, 1995 and April 7, 1995.

James is a world-renowned psychiatrist and arrives in Los Angeles in 1993 as Taylor Hayes's (Hunter Tylo) former professor. During a snowstorm, they are trapped and nearly die, and end up having sex to stay alive, while Taylor is married to Ridge Forrester (Ron Moss). During this time, James had been engaged to Taylor's rival Brooke Logan (Katherine Kelly Lang). James goes on to date Lauren Fenmore (Tracey E. Bregman) but later falls in love with Maggie Forrester and marries her. However, Sheila Carter (Kimberlin Brown) blackmails him into an affair. He divorces Maggie and Sheila becomes pregnant with their daughter. He reunites with Maggie but Sheila blackmails him into marriage. He marries her and they begin raising their child, Mary Carter Warwick, together. James divorces Sheila and takes Mary away from her, but Sheila later kidnaps Mary. James searches for them and leaves town in 1999.

In October 2002, a teenage Mary, who Sheila renamed Erica Lovejoy, is released into James' custody off-screen after Erica is taken to the police station for questioning following Sheila's abduction of Amber Forrester.

James returns in 2007 helping Taylor and leaves in 2008. James returns in 2009, resuming his former position while helping Taylor get treatment for her son, Thomas Forrester (Drew Tyler Bell) while also helping Jackie Marone (Lesley-Anne Down). James also befriends Brooke's sister Donna Logan (Jennifer Gareis) and gives treatment to her other sister and his former friend Katie Logan (Heather Tom). James leaves town in 2010, but returns in 2011 helping Brooke come to terms with seemingly having sex with her stepson and cheating on Ridge, though it later transpires that Brooke did not do so.

In 2017, James is summoned to Los Angeles by Eric Forrester (John McCook), who requested that James examine an allegedly rehabilitated Sheila after she had been injured in a catfight with Eric’s then-current wife Quinn Fuller (Rena Sofer). Before James could present an honest report to Eric, Sheila blackmailed him with evidence of his addiction to painkillers that she had discovered through their daughter, Mary. James reluctantly lied to both Eric and Brooke about Sheila’s alleged recovery and again left town.

== Anthony Armando ==
Anthony Armando was portrayed by Michael Sabatino from October 15, 1993 (episode 1649) to July 28, 1995 (episode 2091).

Anthony is introduced as a customer of a restaurant and bar, named the Taxi, who takes an interest in Macy Alexander.

== Damon Warwick ==
Damon Warwick was portrayed by James Doohan from December 9, 1993 (episode 1687) to January 7, 1994 (episode 1708); from August 19, 1996 (episode 2359) to September 12, 1996 (episode 2375); from December 5, 1996 (episode 2434) to December 9, 1996 (episode 2436); and from November 18, 1997 (episode 2675) to November 24, 1997 (episode 2679).

Damon is introduced as the father of James Warwick.

== Dylan Shaw ==
Dylan Shaw was portrayed by Dylan Neal from May 16, 1994 (episode 1795) to December 9, 1996 (episode 2436).

Dylan is introduced as a candidate for the summer intern position at Forrester Creations.

Dylan, a UCLA college freshman on a baseball scholarship as a pitcher with a double major in International Marketing and Art, is interviewed by Eric Forrester for a summer intern position at Forrester Creations. Dylan is eager to increase his chances of being offered the position after Eric informs him that other applicants will also be interviewed.

Dylan has a second interview with Ridge Forrester. Eric and Ridge are both impressed with him. Ridge later offers Dylan the job, and he accepts.

Eric shows Dylan where he will be working in Forrester and informs him of the job he will be doing. Eric also tells him that dating the Forrester models is off limits.

Ivana Vanderveld, a Forrester model who is aware of Eric’s dating rule, begins flirting with Dylan shortly after his start of employment.

== Jessica Forrester ==
Jessica Forrester was portrayed by Maitland Ward from May 18, 1994 (episode 1797) to December 9, 1996 (episode 2436).

Jessica is introduced as the 16-year old niece of Eric Forrester (John McCook) and stays with his former wife, Stephanie (Susan Flannery) during her parents' divorce. She begins dating Dylan Shaw (Dylan Neal) but the relationship ends when he is charged with statuary rape, although he is found not guilty. Dylan then begins dating Jessica's mother, Maggie (Barbara Crampton), but she breaks up with him when she realizes that Jessica is in love with him. Jessica begins dating Sly Donovan (Brent Jasmer), who wants to get her pregnant so that he can get some of her family's money. Sly rapes her when she breaks up with him in order to be with Dylan again. Jessica then leaves with her mother to study in London.

A writer from Soaps She Knows called her an "attractive Forrester female" and hoped that Ward will return and "grace our screens again!"

== Ivana Vanderveld ==
Ivana Vanderveld was portrayed by Monika Schnarre from June 2, 1994 (episode 1808) to April 7, 1995 (episode 2012).

Ivana is introduced as a model of Forrester Creations.

Ridge Forrester inspects a dress that Ivana models and has Dylan Shaw, the new intern at Forrester Creations, take notes of the modifications Ridge wants for the dress. Ivana speaks up about another problem with the dress. Ridge inspects it and determines that she saved the company from a major recall by speaking up.

After the inspection, Ivana flirts with Dylan and asks him out on a coffee date, although they are both aware of Eric Forrester’s rule that dating the models is off limits to Dylan.

== Megan Conley ==
Megan Conley was portrayed by Maeve Quinlan from March 3, 1995 to 2006.

Megan is introduced as an employee of Forrester Creations.

An explosion occurs in the lab at Forrester Creations with Ridge Forrester inside, and Megan is first seen running behind Mike Guthrie and another employee to investigate. They find a fire inside the lab, and the third employee grabs a fire extinguisher and begins putting it out. Mike and Megan call out to see if anyone is in the lab. She warns the third employee not to touch anything due to the chemicals. Mike finds Ridge on the floor. They all begin pulling debris off of and away from Ridge. Mike instructs Megan to call 911. She begins to panic, and when Mike realizes this, he orders her to move. She eventually finds a phone on the wall corridor outside of the lab and calls 911 to report the explosion and ask for an ambulance for Ridge. Megan tries to assist the company nurse until Brooke Forrester and Jessica Forrester enter the lab after being notified of the explosion. Megan moves away to allow Brooke some room with Ridge. Megan watches as the paramedics arrive and begin to treat Ridge.

Megan is next seen again in May 1995 leaving something in Sheila Carter’s office. Mike walks in looking for Sheila, who has stepped out. Megan asks Mike about his recent date, and he says the suit he borrowed from her didn’t exactly do the job. Sheila returns and hastily asks Megan to leave.

Megan is seen later in the month in Sheila’s office going through a clothes rack when Mike enters looking for Sheila. Megan inquires about Mike, and he mentions a friend in trouble without saying Sheila’s name. Megan says she knows a good psychiatrist, but Mike says it was a psychiatrist who got the friend in trouble in the first place. He tells Megan that the friend is about to blow it for herself, which could have repercussions on him. Megan doesn’t understand, and he tells her she doesn’t want to know. She wishes him good luck and departs the office.

Later, Megan is being dragged by Mike into Sheila’s office. Mike asks Megan to play dumb if anyone asks her questions about him and Sheila knowing each other. He tells Megan that Stephanie Forrester came down on him, and it looks like things are about to go south for Sheila. He has no intentions of going down with her. He tells Megan that the two of them were involved in something bad. He denies breaking the law when she asks. Mike begs Megan not to say anything about him and Sheila, and she agrees. She suggests that Mike go home and rest with the obvious stress he’s under. He tells her he won’t forget her doing this for him and departs.

Days go by, and Megan walks into Sheila’s office with a clothes rack, where Mike is panicking after realizing that Sheila has stolen his gun. Megan mentions seeing many law officers earlier in the Forrester Creations parking lot. He asks her where the officers went, and she replies that they left with the Forresters. Mike begins panicking again and says he can’t be responsible for what Sheila does. Megan realizes all the excitement is about Sheila. He tells her that Sheila stole his gun. When she asks why, he tells her she isn’t exactly of sound mind. He flips back and forth saying Sheila is and isn’t his friend. He doesn’t approve of what she does. Megan asks who Sheila is mad at if it’s not him, and he tells her just about everyone else.

== Maggie Forrester ==
Maggie Forrester was portrayed by Barbara Crampton from June 14, 1995 (episode 2059) to April 14, 1998 (episode 2774).

Maggie is introduced as the mother of Jessica Forrester and ex-sister-in-law of Eric Forrester.

== Michael Lai ==
Michael Lai was portrayed by Lindsay Price from June 23, 1995 (episode 2066) to July 16, 1997 (episode 2588).

Michael is introduced as the new roommate of Dylan Shaw and as being 18 years old.

== Jasmine Malone ==
Jasmine Malone was portrayed by Lark Voorhies from July 5, 1995 (episode 2074) to October 16, 1996 (episode 2399). She was a fashion design intern for Forrester Creations. Voorhies was a regular in the role, which she reportedly quit as it conflicted with her religion.

== Brian Carey ==
Brian Carey was portrayed by Kin Shriner from October 26, 1995 (episode 2151) to March 11, 1996 (episode 2246).

== Sarah Rishmond ==
Sarah Rishmond was portrayed by Ellen Wheeler from October 26, 1995 (episode 2151) to December 18, 1995 (episode 2187).

== Grant Chambers ==
Grant Chambers was portrayed by Charles Grant from April 12, 1996 (episode 2268) to 1998.

A writer from Soap Opera Digest called Grant "a talented and very ambitious fashion designer". A writer from the same magazine believed that Grant was Brooke's "worst" love interest, noting that Brooke would come to "regret marrying Grant to spite Ridge in 1997" due to his manipulation and lies.

== Alicia Cortéz ==
Alicia Cortéz was portrayed by Ivonne Coll from 1996 to 1997.

== Claudia Cortéz ==
Claudia Cortéz was portrayed by Lilly Melgar from 1996 to 1997.

== Enrique Alvarez ==
Enrique Alvarez was portrayed by George Alvarez from 1996 to 1997.

== Hunter Jones ==
Hunter Jones was portrayed by Tristan Rogers in 1997.

== Erica Lovejoy ==
Erica Lovejoy
- The Bold and the Beautiful character
- Portrayed by: Amber and Jade Collins (1997); Jacob and Lucas Barnes (1997); Jessica and Sarah Haas (1998); Courtnee Draper (2002)
- Duration: 1997–98, 2002
- First appearance: 1997
- Last appearance: October 18, 2002
In-universe information
- Father: James Warwick
- Mother: Sheila Carter
- Half-brothers: Ryder Callahan; John Finnegan
- Half-sisters: Daisy Carter; Diana Carter
- Grandfathers: Damon Warwick
- Grandmothers: Molly Carter; Mary Warwick
- Aunts: Sarah Smythe
- Nephews: Hayes Finnegan
- Nieces: Luna Nozawa; Lucy Romalotti

Erica Lovejoy, whose birth name was Mary Carter Warwick, was portrayed by a series of child actors in 1997 and 1998. Courtnee Draper portrayed the character from April 17, 2002 (episode 3777) to October 18, 2002 (episode 3906).

Mary is introduced as the daughter of Sheila Carter and James Warwick. Sheila kidnaps Mary and leaves Los Angeles in 1998. She changes Mary's name to Erica Lovejoy during the time she is gone. When a teenage Erica is introduced in April 2002, she is living in Mystic, Connecticut. Erica is a huge fan of Amber Moore during the time and decides to leave Mystic and move to Los Angeles to meet and befriend Amber. Her mother is asleep when she sneaks out of her home and flies to Los Angeles. Amber is grieving the loss of her baby with Rick Forrester while she is in the hospital when Erica arrives to offer her condolences and to help Amber get through this difficult time. Erica rents an apartment from Ziggy Deadmarsh and meets Zende Forrester Dominguez at the school he attends. She eventually becomes the babysitter for Eric Forrester III, the adoptive son of Rick and Amber and biological son of Deacon Sharpe and Becky Moore. Erica develops a crush on Rick during this time.

In May 2002, it is revealed that Sheila is Erica's mother when Sheila returns to Los Angeles, finds Erica, and is determined to take her back to Mystic. Erica is unaware that Sheila knows the Forrester family and was once married to Eric Forrester. She is also unaware that Sheila kidnapped her as a baby and that she was renamed from Mary to Erica in tribute to her mother's continued love for Eric. Erica also doesn't yet know who her father is.

== Bradley Baker ==
Bradley Baker is a police chief of Los Angeles. He is always involved with Forrester, Logan and Spencer families when one of them have an accident. He has a son, Charlie. Baker is portrayed by Dan Martin.

In 2025, Diane Brounstein and Mara Levinsky from Soap Opera Digest called the character the "hardest-working cop in Los Angeles".

== Pierce Peterson ==
Pierce Peterson was portrayed by Paul Satterfield from July 8, 1998 (episode 2835) to April 7, 1999 (episode 3019).

Pierce is introduced as a psychiatrist and motivational speaker who is interested in meeting with Taylor Forrester for an associate position within his company.

== Adam Alexander ==
Adam Alexander is the former lover of Sally Spectra, and the father of Macy Alexander and Kimberly Fairchild. He was portrayed by Michael Swan from 1998 to 2003.

== Rebecca "Becky" Moore ==
Becky Moore is the cousin of Amber Moore. She was portrayed by Marissa Tait from 1999 to 2000.

== Tawny Moore ==
Tawny Moore is the mother of Amber Moore and April Knight. She was portrayed by Andrea Evans from March 29, 1999, to June 9, 2000 (episode 3320), and again from 2010 to 2011. The character also appeared on The Young and the Restless in a crossover event on May 12, 2010.

A writer from Soap Opera Digest called Tawny "manipulative" and believed that the Moore family was one of the most memorable on The Bold and the Beautiful.

== Giovanni Lorenzano ==
Giovanni Lorenzano was portrayed by Victor Alfieri from 1999 to 2000, and again in 2004 and 2009.
