= Mystery Monsters =

1997 movie directed by Charles Band

- Directed by: Charles Band (as Robert Talbot)
- Written by: Neal Marshall Stevens (as Benjamin Carr)
- Starring: Ashley Cafagna-Tesoro; Tim Redwine
- Cinematography: James Lawrence Spencer
- Edited by: Andy Horvitch
- Music by: Richard Kosinski
- Distributed by: PulsePounders!
- Release date: July 29, 1997
- Running time: 81 minutes
- Country: United States
- Language: English

Mystery Monsters is a 1997 film directed by Charles Band and starring Ashley Cafagna-Tesoro and Tim Redwine.

== Plot ==
Tommy has just joined the cast of the top-rated kids' show, "Captain Mike's Mystery Monsters," and is anxious to find out just how the special effects crew gets the monsters to work. Imagine his surprise when he discovers they're not special effects at all! Complicating the situation, the monsters' previous owner, evil Queen Mara, has returned to Earth to reclaim her property and take revenge on Captain Mike for stealing them.

== DVD release ==
The film was released on DVD by Full Moon Features in April 2012 under the title of "Goobers!".
