= Christian Youth Theater =

American theater arts education program

CYT National Logo

Christian Youth Theater (CYT) is an American after-school theater arts education program for children ages 4–18. It offers classes in drama, dance, and singing and performs 3–9 productions a year, in a collection of branches around the country. Many branches have summer touring groups, including improvisational theatre teams. CYT is an arts educational nonprofit organization and not affiliated with any church, nor are participants required to be members of any particular church, denomination, or religion, although participants are expected to adhere to certain behavioral requirements while participating, such as refraining from use of illegal drugs, alcohol, and tobacco products. Branches sometimes provide programming for both adults and children under the name Christian Community Theater.

CYT groups have performed musicals such as Beauty and the Beast, Peter Pan, Cinderella, Sleeping Beauty, Annie, The Music Man, and Les Miserables: School Edition. The group also performs original musicals, some of them musical versions of drama, including musical versions of A Little Princess. The group has also adapted stories such as "Pocahontas", "Alice in Wonderland", and "The Jungle Book" into original musicals.

Classes are offered each session at each branch, as well as summer camps throughout the summer. Classes are typically 10 weeks long during the fall, winter, and spring sessions. More specialized topics are often covered such as improvisational theatre, theatrical makeup, set construction, accents and dialects, stunts, special effects and theatre criticism.

In CYT, at least one parent of each cast member is typically expected to serve on a committee. These committees perform tasks such as building sets and props, supervising the backstage crew, and supervising the lights/sound technical team in the booth (which is composed of both adult committee members and non-adults, typically with a minimum age of 10). Children from 8–18 participate in character/acting roles on stage in each production.

== Mission statement ==
CYT's mission is to "develop[] character and creativity through quality theater arts training that brings families and communities together while reflecting Jesus."

== History ==
Christian Community Theater was founded by Paul and Sheryl Russell and Marjorie Blyth in San Diego, California. CYT was later founded in 1981 as an after-school performing arts program.

Today, there are 22 CYT branches across the United States: Austin, Texas (est. 2015); Baton Rouge, Louisiana (2013); Spokane, Washington (1998); Lake Charles, Louisiana (2017); Colorado Springs, Colorado (2020); Dallas, Texas (2016); Sacramento, California (2012); Atlanta, Georgia (2003); Vancouver, Washington (2013); Houston, Texas (2006); Nashville, Tennessee (2012); Fredericksburg, Virginia (2006); Chicago, Illinois (1997); Tucson, Arizona (2005); Phoenix, Arizona (2006); Coeur d'Alene, Idaho (2007); San Antonio, Texas (2011); San Diego, California (1980); Santa Cruz, California (2011); Livermore, California (2014); Clearwater, Florida (2024); and Lafayette, Louisiana (2009) CYT has grown to be the largest youth theater training program in the nation, training thousands of students each year.

== Reports of child sexual abuse ==
In July 2020, multiple students from the San Diego branch came forward with allegations of sexual abuse by CYT teachers. The students also claimed that they were ignored by the Russell family when they brought the allegations to them in the mid-2000s. The San Diego branch closed for a time, before restarting production less than a year later, with Russell family still in leadership positions.

CYT San Diego issued a statement saying "the Russells will no longer serve in leadership roles for CYT San Diego." As of April 2022, Janie Russell Cox, the daughter of founders Paul and Sheryl, is still listed as CYT San Diego's Artistic Director and regularly directing plays. Although she has dropped the last name "Russell" in response.

In October 2021 two former employees were charged with sexually abusing underage girls. Brad Christian Davis, 40, is charged with sexual penetration by a foreign object. A criminal complaint shows the crime, a felony, is alleged to have occurred in 2011. The alleged victim was a 16-year-old girl, while Davis would have been 29 or 30 at the time. David Franklin Hott, 34, is accused of committing lewd and lascivious acts upon a 13-year-old girl in 2007, when he would have been 19 or 20 years old. He faces two felonies. Both men pleaded in February 2022, not guilty.

In March 2022 another lawsuit was filed on behalf of six plaintiffs detailing the abuse of at least 10 children between 1991 and 2011, and that Christian Youth Theater's culture "normalized grooming behaviors in which adults were able to target children, gain their trust, and slowly and incrementally push the boundaries further to the point of sexual abuse." It also alleges that Paul and Sheryl Russell, who founded Christian Youth Theater in 1981 and grew it into one of the nation's largest youth theater organizations, knew about the abuse as early as 1992, yet failed to act. It claims that Paul Russell, who remained the leader of the program until 2017, "engaged in negligent conduct in order to cover up child sexual abuse, including failing to report (to law enforcement), denying the reports of children, misinforming parents as to the nature of their children's abuse, and failing to advise parents of the existence of alleged child abusers within the organization."

== Notable alumni ==
- Jason Russell co-founder of Invisible Children, Inc.
- Michelle Williams, film actress
- Ryan Hanson, actor, Veronica Mars
- Ryn Weaver, singer
- Ashley Tesoro, Film & TV actress, singer
- Cami Bradley, singer, America's Got Talent finalist
- Denyse Tontz, Film & TV actress, singer
- Melissa Disney, voice actress, As Told By Ginger
- Joshua Bassett, actor and singer, High School Musical: The Musical: The Series
- Grace Kinstler, American Idol contestant
- Charnette Batey, Hamilton cast member
