= Y2K (1999 film) =

1999 American TV movie directed by Dick Lowry

- Genre: Sci-Fi; Thriller
- Written by: Thomas Hines; Jonathan Fernandez
- Directed by: Dick Lowry
- Starring: Ken Olin; Kate Vernon; Lauren Tom; Joe Morton; Zack Ward
- Music by: Brad Fiedel
- Country of origin: United States
- Original language: English

Production
- Executive producers: Patrick Caddell; David Israel
- Producer: Michael R. Joyce
- Cinematography: David Geddes
- Editor: Stephen Lovejoy
- Production companies: BIg Productions; Michael R. Joyce Productions; NBC Studios; HBO Pictures

Original release
- Network: NBC
- Release: November 21, 1999

Y2K (also known as Countdown to Chaos and Y2K: The Movie) is a 1999 American made-for-television science fiction-thriller film directed by Dick Lowry and starring Ken Olin and Kate Vernon. The film takes a fictional look at the societal problems that could ensue from widespread computer shutdowns caused by the Year 2000 problem, also known as the Y2K problem or the Millennium bug. The film premiered November 21, 1999 on NBC.

The film's airing sparked a controversy after some utility and banking industry trade associations, including the Edison Electric Institute, asked TV stations not to air the film. Before the film aired, executive producer David Israel called the concerns "silly". "My guess is some of the things we say are going to happen might happen, and some we say might won't," he told Variety in November 1999. "It's not like Y2K is a big secret." The film was preceded by a disclaimer stating: "This program does not suggest or imply that any of these events could actually occur."

It was harshly criticized by critics as well as the technology press.

== Background ==
Executive producer David Israel and his partner, Patrick Caddell, developed the idea of making a Y2K disaster film in summer 1998. Israel told the Los Angeles Times: "Frankly, I was astonished that nobody else pitched it. When we were able to clear the title 'Y2K,' I was flabbergasted. I was surprised we are the only fictional thing that got made."

Another Y2K-themed film with the same title and starring Louis Gossett Jr., Sarah Chalke and Malcolm McDowell was produced and released straight to video in 1999.

== Plot ==
Nick Cromwell is an MIT-trained "Y2K troubleshooter", the son of a NASA problem-solver. As midnight on January 1, 2000 arrives in the Eastern Time Zone and computers shut down because of the bug, the entire Atlantic Seaboard goes dark and Cromwell assists a plane to land in Washington, DC, without runway lights. Word then arrives of a nuclear power plant in Sweden suffering a meltdown and killing all the workers, so he takes a supersonic jet back to his hometown of Seattle to avert disaster at the similar power plant there. Everyone within a 10-mile radius of the plant is ordered to evacuate, including Cromwell's wife, Alix, a physician who is delivering a millennium baby. But the Cromwells' 16-year-old daughter Kelly has disobeyed her mother's order to stay home with her younger brother, so Alix begins searching the city for her.

Other Y2K-related disasters around the country shown in the film include a Navy F-18 crashing; a patient dying in surgery when a hospital's backup generators fail; computers unlocking all doors in a Texas prison; and Jay Leno continuing to broadcast The Tonight Show With Jay Leno.

== Cast ==
- Ken Olin as Nick Cromwell
- Joe Morton as Martin Lowell
- Kate Vernon as Alix Cromwell
- Lauren Tom as Ann Lee
- Zack Ward as Rick Rothmans
- Rex Linn as Nuclear plant foreman
- Jay Leno as himself
- Inday Ba
- Jane McGregor as Kelly Cromwell
- Ronny Cox as Benjamin Cromwell
- Michal Suchánek as Donny Cromwell
- Terence Kelly as Roy Jenkins

== Reception ==
The film received negative reviews from many critics. Writing for Variety, Ray Richmond called it a "ridiculous sweeps-ploitation thriller". Wired wrote that the film had a "hackneyed approach to storytelling" and was "a rather pedestrian action movie", while the Washington Post's Tom Shales dismissed the film for being insufficient as a thriller, noting that "it never quickens the pulse or sets the senses on edge the way a thriller ought to do. It merely catalogues random catastrophes that could possibly maybe might occur at midnight when we leave the miserable 1900s behind and plunge headlong into the 2000s." ZDNet's Mitch Ratcliffe called it "indescribably silly".

Several media outlets also took aim at the film for its technical inaccuracies, including ZDNet, which highlighted more than 25 "myths" from the film, and Computerworld, which printed a "Fact or Fiction?" rundown.
