= Chuck Walling =

American stage and television actor

- Born: Charles Walling Jr. July 2, 1929; Tulsa, Oklahoma, U.S.
- Died: April 4, 2019 (aged 89)
- Occupations: Stage and television actor

Charles Walling Jr. (July 2, 1929 – April 4, 2019) was an American stage and television actor. He was best known for playing Charlie Maclaine in the American soap opera television series The Bold and the Beautiful.

== Life and career ==
Walling was born in Tulsa, Oklahoma, the son of Charles Sr. and Gladys Walling. He attended North Hollywood High School, graduating in 1947. After graduating, he served in the United States Navy during the Korean War, which after his discharge, he attended California Polytechnic State University, San Luis Obispo. He also studied at the Pasadena Playhouse, graduating in 1957. He performed on stage, and began his screen career in 1987, appearing in the NBC action adventure television series The A-Team. In the same year, he appeared in the television programs Jake and the Fatman and The Golden Girls.

Later in his career, Walling guest-starred in television programs including Dynasty, Highway to Heaven, Quantum Leap, Major Dad, Santa Barbara and Hunter. From 1990 to 1991, he played Charlie Maclaine, the brother of Ben Maclaine (John Brandon) in the CBS soap opera television series The Bold and the Beautiful. He also played Benny Lowman in the NBC soap opera television series Days of Our Lives.

== Death ==
Walling died on April 4, 2019, at the age of 89.
