= Perry Stephens =

American actor

- Born: Perry Stephens Moody; February 14, 1958; Frankfurt, Germany
- Died: September 8, 2005 (aged 47); Santa Monica, California
- Occupation: Actor

Perry Stephens (February 14, 1958 – September 8, 2005), born Perry Stephens Moody in Frankfurt, Germany, was an American actor known primarily for his roles on daytime soap operas, including the role of Jack Forbes on Loving from 1983 to 1990 and Steve Crown on The Bold and the Beautiful in 1993. He also starred as John F. Kennedy in From Norma Jean to Marilyn, a television biopic of Marilyn Monroe, and played smarmy studio publicity agent Jack Sweeney on AMC's comic series about a 1930s movie studio, The Lot. In 1993, he starred in the role of the journalist anti-mafia Perry on the Italian-Argentine telenovela Micaela.

Stephens grew up in Decatur, Alabama. While attending Decatur High School he got his first taste of acting as Curly in Rodgers and Hammerstein's OKLAHOMA! in 1976. He attended Samford University in Birmingham and continued to do college and community plays along with singing in choir and a barbershop quartet. After college he and went on to perform in musical theater at Opryland Musical Theme Park in Nashville early in his career.

In addition to appearing in several movies, Stephens was a guest on a number of popular television shows, including L.A. Heat, Wings and Family Matters, as well as a 1996 cameo on the hit show Frasier as Stan the bartender. In the fall of 1997, He played Mr. Anderson, Scott Whyte's father on City Guys in which he appeared for three seasons. In 2001, Stephens returned to the stage in the play Judah Ben-Hur.

Stephens was also a talented singer and was successful in several countries, among them South Africa.

Stephens died of liver failure at age 47 on September 8, 2005 in Santa Monica, California.
