= Noah (1998 film) =

- VHS Cover
- Written by: Juliet Giglio; Keith Giglio; Charles F. Bohl
- Directed by: Ken Kwapis
- Starring: Tony Danza; Wallace Shawn; Jane Sibbett
- Music by: Van Dyke Parks
- Country of origin: United States
- Original language: English

Production
- Producer: Steven North
- Cinematography: Ron Orieux; Brian Whittred
- Running time: 120 minutes
- Production companies: Noah Productions Ltd. Walt Disney Television

Original release
- Network: ABC
- Release: October 11, 1998

Disney's Noah is a 1998 television film directed by Ken Kwapis. The movie premiered on ABC on October 11, 1998, as part of The Wonderful World of Disney and stars Tony Danza as a modern-day jaded contractor who undergoes a remarkable transformation while building an ark like Noah's. It also stars Wallace Shawn and Jane Sibbett.

== Plot ==
In order to save his family and home town, contractor Norman Waters (Tony Danza) is tasked by an angel named Zach (Wallace Shawn) to rebuild Noah's Ark in 40 days to prepare for a great massive flood.

== Cast ==
- Tony Danza as Norman Waters
- Wallace Shawn as Zach
- Jane Sibbett as Angela
- Chris Marquette as Daniel Waters
- Jesse Moss as Levon Waters
- Michal Suchánek as Benny Waters
- Lloyd Berry as Noah
- Kevin McNulty as Norman's boss
- Nicola Cavendish as Penelope the restaurant owner
- Paul Coeur as Ray the bribe taking Inspector
- Jane McGregor as Kathy Simmons Levon's girlfriend
- Joe Norman Shaw as Aris Norman's competitor
- Jaia Talisman as Cute woman (as Anita Matthys) Aris’ girlfriend
- Melanie Merkosky as Cheerleader #1
- Lisa Christie as Telephone Girl #3
- Kyla Wise as Elevator Girl (as Kyla Anderson)
- Linda Red Hawk: Yoga Teacher

== Reception ==
In reviewing films influenced by the tale of Noah's Ark, Dan Craft of The Pantagraph called Noah a "dire Disney Channel offering".
