= Demon in the Bottle =

- Australian VHS Artwork
- Directed by: Randall William Cook
- Written by: Randall Fontana & Joe Grutzik (Story) and Timothy Michaels & Randall William Cook (Screenplay)
- Produced by: Oana Paunescu; Vlad Paunescu
- Starring: Ashley Tesoro; Michael Malota; Rahi Azizi; Michael Dubrow; Michael Walters; Franklin A. Vallette; Randall William Cook
- Cinematography: Adolfo Bartoli
- Edited by: Steven Nielson
- Music by: John W. Morgan
- Production companies: Castel Film Romania; Full Moon Entertainment
- Distributed by: Disney Channel
- Release date: March 1, 1996 (United States)
- Running time: 85 minutes
- Countries: United States; Romania
- Language: English

Demon in the Bottle is a 1996 American-Romanian adventure-fantasy film, co-written and directed by Randall William Cook and starred by Ashley Tesoro, Michael Malota and Rahi Azizi.

== Plot ==
After accidentally falling into a secret cave, four kids find a treasure guarded by a demon in a bottle. They inadvertently release the ancient creature and have to find a way to return it to the bottle and spare their own lives.

== Cast ==
- Ashley Tesoro as Amanda
- Michael Malota as Russell
- Rahi Azizi as Freddy
- Michael Dubrow as Marvin
- Michael Walters as Creature / Cannonball Catcher
- Franklin A. Vallette as Bald Pirate
- Randall William Cook as Pirate Captain / Mr. Lambert / Voice of the Guardian
