= David Israel =

American sportswriter (born 1951)

David Israel (born March 17, 1951, in New York City, New York) is an American television producer, writer, former sportswriter and general columnist. A 1973 graduate of Northwestern University's Medill School of Journalism, Israel wrote for the Chicago Daily News, Washington Star, the Chicago Tribune (for which he wrote a nationally syndicated column) and the Los Angeles Herald-Examiner. He is known for violating the "old bylaw" of neutrality in journalism when he announced at the 1980 Lake Placid Olympics hockey game at which the American team eventually beat the Soviets, "Gentlemen, there will be cheering in the press box." He was right.

Israel went on to a career in Hollywood as producer and writer of hour-long television dramas and made-for-television movies and mini-series. His credits include co-executive producer/writer of Tremors: The Series, Midnight Caller and The Untouchables, writer/producer of A Comedy Salute to Baseball Starring Billy Crystal, and a writer on the baseball-themed series Bay City Blues. He also executive produced The Port Chicago Mutiny, Pandora's Clock, House of Frankenstein. and Y2K (TV movie).

In 2000, Don Ohlmeyer hired Israel as coordinating producer to help him retool ABC's Monday Night Football. In a controversial move, they hired comedian Dennis Miller to join Al Michaels and Dan Fouts in the broadcast booth.

In 1984, Israel served as Director, Officer of the President for the Los Angeles Olympic Organizing Committee. In 2004, Governor of California Arnold Schwarzenegger, a personal friend, appointed Israel, a Democrat, to the California Science Center Board. He was president of the Los Angeles Coliseum Commission, having served on the Commission since 2005. In 2008, Schwarzenegger appointed him to the California Horse Racing Board where he served as Chair. As a sports columnist, Israel wrote about the Triple Crown triumphs of "Seattle Slew" and "Affirmed," and about the Preakness and Belmont Stakes.
