= The Lot (TV series) =

1999-2001 American dramedy series

- Created by: Rick Mitz
- Starring: Rue McClanahan; Holland Taylor; Linda Cardellini (season 1); Jonathan Frakes
- Composer: Nicholas Pike
- Country of origin: United States
- Original language: English
- No. of seasons: 2
- No. of episodes: 17

Production
- Executive producers: Marc Juris; Paula Connelly Skorka; Rick Mitz
- Running time: 30 minutes
- Production company: It's Mitz Productions

Original release
- Network: AMC
- Release: August 19, 1999 – April 22, 2001

The Lot is an American comedy-drama television series that aired for two seasons on AMC from 1999 to 2001. It profiled the fictional studio Sylver Screen Pictures during the 1930s and the pursuits of its classic stars (such as Barbara Stanwyck, Greta Garbo and Shirley Temple). The show was not met with popular success but Jeffrey Tambor, Rue McClanahan, Linda Cardellini and Michael York all had notable recurring roles.

The two seasons had two different plotlines. The first season (four episodes) detailed the rise and fall of young starlet June Parker (Linda Cardellini). Cardellini left to star in Freaks and Geeks, forcing a premature end to the first season. The second season (thirteen episodes) revolved around a new main character.

== Cast ==
- Sara Botsford as Norma St. Claire, an aging actress and faded star
- Allen Garfield as Harry Sylver (season 1), owner of Sylver Studios
- Linda Cardellini as June Parker (season 1), a rising starlet
- Steven Petrarca as Charlie Patterson, a young screenwriter
- Stephanie Faracy as Mary Parker, a makeup artist, mother to June, and Norma's friend
- Francois Giroday as Fabian, a closeted designer
- Holland Taylor as Letitia DeVine, a high-powered Hollywood gossip columnist
- Perry Stephens as Jack Sweeney, an unscrupulous studio publicist
- Jonathan Frakes as Roland White, a playboy movie mogul

== Episodes ==
=== Season 1 (1999) ===
No. overall	No. in season	Title	Directed by	Written by	Original release date
1	1	"It"	Guy Ferland	Rick Mitz	August 19, 1999
2	2	"Overnight Star"	Guy Ferland	Story by : Rick Mitz & Barbara Romen; Teleplay by : Rick Mitz	August 19, 1999
3	3	"Stardom"	Guy Ferland	Rick Mitz & Barbara Romen	August 20, 1999
4	4	"Happy Landing"	Guy Ferland	Rick Mitz & Barbara Romen	August 20, 1999

=== Season 2 (2001) ===
No. overall	No. in season	Title	Directed by	Written by	Original release date
5	1	"A New Mogul in Town"	Doug Wager	Rick Mitz	January 7, 2001
6	2	"Hooked on Hollywood"	Doug Wager	Susan Rice	January 14, 2001
7	3	"The Portable Libby Wilson"	Sharon Hall	Steven Peros	January 21, 2001
8	4	"Detox"	Sharon Hall	Hall Powell & Steven Peros	January 28, 2001
9	5	"The Accident"	Jonathan Schmock	Colleen O'Dwyer	February 4, 2001
10	6	"Nebraska Johnston"	Sharon Hall	Lori Lakin	February 11, 2001
11	7	"Daddy Dearest"	Turi Meyer	Jay Wolpert	February 25, 2001
12	8	"Stiffed"	Turi Meyer	Jay Wolpert	March 4, 2001
13	9	"Danny Matthews Takes a Wife"	Doug Wager	Rick Mitz	March 18, 2001
14	10	"The Mob Scene"	Turi Meyer	Dustin Hughes, Rick Mitz, & Barbara Romen	March 25, 2001
15	11	"Oscar's Wild"	Sharon Hall	Kim Powers	April 1, 2001
16	12	"Kids"	Turi Meyer	Rob Dames & Lenny Ripps	April 8, 2001
17	13	"Property of Silver Screen"	Unknown	Unknown	April 22, 2001

== Historical references ==
The characters of Priscilla Tremaine (Rue McClanahan) and Letitia DeVine (Holland Taylor) were based on gossip columnists Hedda Hopper and Louella Parsons, respectively. A running end-credits gag had Letitia DeVine reporting ironic news items about period stars on her radio show, then insulting them sotto voce when the broadcast was over. Roland White (Jonathan Frakes) is based on millionaire aeronautical engineer and movie mogul Howard Hughes, who was known for his relationships with redheaded Hollywood starlets.

A movie being made by Sylver Studios refers to The Moon Is Blue, a movie famously censored for having Maggie McNamara say the word "virgin" in one of her lines.

Sylver Studios was a stand-in for Samuel Goldwyn Productions. The title The Lot also refers to the famed Pickford-Fairbanks Studios lot in Hollywood, California, which rented out production space to multiple film studios.

== Critical reception ==
Hal Boedeker of the Orlando Sentinel called The Lot "an acid satire on the Golden Age of Hollywood" that is "a clever blend of humor and Tinseltown lore". He added, "The Lot has been made with flair and affection, but it also has a clear-eyed view of Hollywood folly, ambition and back-biting. It's like Singin' in the Rain without the music and without the love." Cardellini received praise for her performance as June Parker.

In Variety, Ray Richmond wrote, "The fact that 'The Lot' is cartoonishly overacted adds juice to the show’s camp irreverence, whether or not the scenery-chewing is intentional. Regardless, its creator-writer-exec producer Rick Mitz has clear affection for — and a sure grasp of — his subject."

== Awards and nominations ==
Award	Year	Category	Nominee	Result	Ref.
Costume Designers Guild Awards	2002	Excellence in Costume Design for Television – Period/Fantasy	Jean-Pierre Dorléac	Nominated	
Casting Society of America Awards	2001	Best Casting for TV – Comedy Episodic	Deborah Barylski, Pat McCorkle	Nominated	
Emmy Awards	2001	Outstanding Costumes for a Series	Jean-Pierre Dorléac, Gilberto Mello	Won	
Emmy Awards	2001	Outstanding Guest Actor in a Comedy Series	Michael York	Nominated	
Emmy Awards	2001	Outstanding Hairstyling for a Series	Cheri Ruff, Carl Bailey, Stephen Elsbree	Nominated	
Emmy Awards	2000	Outstanding Guest Actress in a Comedy Series	Holland Taylor	Nominated	
