= Hoku (album) =

Studio album by Hoku
- Released: May 2, 2000 (United States)
- Recorded: 1999–2000
- Genres: Bubblegum pop; teen pop; Europop
- Length: 40:34
- Label: Geffen
- Producers: Antonina Armato (tracks 1–10), Tim James (additional production: 1 and 3), Hoku (track 11)

Hoku chronology
Hoku (2000)	Listen Up (2008)

Hoku is the debut album by Hoku, released on May 2, 2000. The album attained modest commercial success, peaking at number 151 on the US Billboard 200 album chart and within the top 10 of the Heatseekers Albums chart. The album had sold more than 230,000 copies in the United States within three years of its release. The album elicited generally favorable reviews from critics, who praised the album's lightheartedness and compared Hoku's music to that of Jewel and Liz Phair, although some took issue with the lyrics.

The album spawned two singles. The lead single, "Another Dumb Blonde", was featured in the motion picture Snow Day and became a top 40 hit on the Billboard Hot 100. Follow-up single "How Do I Feel (The Burrito Song)" was less successful, failing to chart but yielding positive feedback from critics. Hoku remains Hoku's only full-length, major label album to date, and one of only two releases (the other being her 2008 EP Listen Up).

== Composition ==
Hoku's debut album is generally classified as 2000's bubblegum pop, teen pop or Europop. The lyrics of lead single "Another Dumb Blonde" discuss the fact that Hoku's boyfriend "isn't after her heart or mind". The lyrics were noted for being "innocent", with many noting that the songs bear little resemblance to those of Britney Spears or Christina Aguilera. On "How Do I Feel (The Burrito Song)", Hoku describes her crush on a boy eating a burrito at a Mexican food stand with another girl described as "some brunette". Hoku was involved in writing two of the songs on the album: "We Will Follow the Sun", which she co-wrote with Antonina Armato and Ron Harris, and "You First Believed", which she wrote alone.

== Reception ==
=== Critical ===
Professional ratings
Review scores
Source	Rating
AllMusic	3/5 stars
New Straits Times	2/5 stars
Spin	7/10
The Vancouver Sun	2.5/5 stars

Upon its release, the album elicited generally favorable reviews from music critics. Stephen Thomas Erlewine, for AllMusic, deemed Hoku an "Album Pick", writing that it "never tries to sound wiser than its years and it never seems to pander to commercial concerns. Sure, it's commercial -- that's what teen pop is all about -- but never once do the record makers decide to push Hoku as a nymphet," comparing her to Jewel and concluding that the album is a "winning debut". A review in Spin, penned by Joshua Glover, gave the album a score of seven out of 10 and commenting that "the album's as empty as a Buddhist monk and way more fun," criticizing "You First Believed" as "craptastic" but singling out "How Do I Feel (The Burrito Song)" as a highlight and likening the Vocoder on "Another Dumb Blonde" to that on Liz Phair's Exile in Guyville.

=== Commercial ===
Upon its release, the album attained modest commercial success in the United States. On the US Billboard 200 album chart dated May 20, 2000, the album debuted at number 151, its peak. That week, the album also debuted on the Billboard Heatseekers Albums chart, at number 8. The following week, the album fell to number 181 on the Billboard 200, and number 12 on the Heatseekers Albums chart. Five months later, on the Billboard 200 chart dated November 4, 2000, the album re-entered at number 197, for its third and final week on the chart. The album spent a total of 30 weeks on the Heatseekers Albums chart. As of 2003, three years after its release, the album has sold 235,000 copies in the United States, according to Billboard.

The album remains Hoku's only album to chart on the Billboard 200. It is also her only full-length album release, and one of only two multi-song releases, the other being her 2008 EP Listen Up.

== Singles ==
"Another Dumb Blonde" was released as the album's lead single on January 18, 2000. It was featured on the soundtrack for the children's motion picture Snow Day, and peaked at number 27 on the Billboard Hot 100, thereby giving her a higher peak on that chart than her father, Don Ho, had ever achieved (his highest-peaking single, "Tiny Bubble", only reached number 57). The single elicited favorable reviews from critics: Billboard praised "Another Dumb Blonde" as "refreshingly zesty" and commended the song for not being "overly cutesy." Erlewine commended the song as "exuberant and slyly clever", adding that it "would be good enough for most dance-pop divas", naming the song a highlight of Hoku. Glover commented that the song "has Temporary Parking on the pop charts written all over it, Next Stop One-Hit Wonderland," but called the song a "boppy smash". The music video, which depicted Hoku on the beach and in the snow, went into rotation on MTV, on which it became a top 10 hit.

Follow-up single "How Do I Feel (The Burrito Song)" was less successful commercially, failing to enter the Billboard Hot 100 and the Mainstream Top 40 charts. However, it received play on Power Play Music Video Television. Critics were favorable in their assessments of the song, with many opining that it was hit-worthy. Glover called it "an indie-type meditation [...] laid over jump-stop guitar and a bubblelicious Disneybeat."

== Track listing ==
1. "Another Dumb Blonde" – 3:53 (Antonina Armato, Tim James)
2. "What You Need" – 3:40 (Soulshock and Karlin, Peter Biker, Armato)
3. "How Do I Feel (The Burrito Song)" – 2:56 (Armato, James)
4. "Just Enough" – 3:47 (Rodney Jerkins, Armato)
5. "Oxygen" – 3:28 (Armato)
6. "Nothing in This World" – 4:06 (Armato, Andy Hill)
7. "In the First Place" – 3:52 (Armato, James)
8. "Every Time" – 3:55 (Armato)
9. "I'm Scared" (featuring Tim James) – 4:04 (Armato, James)
10. "We Will Follow the Sun" – 3:22 (Hoku, Armato, Ron Harris)
11. "You First Believed" – 3:31 (Hoku)

== Charts ==
Chart (2000)	Peak position
US Billboard 200	151
US Heatseekers Albums (Billboard)	8
