= John Brandon (actor) =

American film, stage and television actor (1929–2014)

- Brandon in Scarface (1983)
- Born: John Edward Barandon; June 21, 1929; Rego Park, New York, U.S.
- Died: August 25, 2014 (aged 85); Middle Village, New York, U.S.
- Occupation: Actor
- Years active: 1960–2007
- Spouse: Irene Brandon (died 1995)

John Edward Barandon (June 21, 1929 – August 25, 2014) was an American film, stage and television actor. He was best known for playing the recurring role of William Handler, the corrupted police captain in the final season of the American soap opera television series Dynasty.

== Life and career ==
Brandon was born in Rego Park, New York, the son of John Thomas and Sarah Barandon. He served in the United States Army during the Korean War, which after his discharge, he emigrated to the United Kingdom. He began his screen career in 1960, appearing in the BBC anthology television series BBC Sunday-Night Play. In the same year, he appeared in ITV Television Playhouse. In 1966, he appeared in his first credited film Arrivederci, Baby!, playing a radio engineer.

Later in his career, Brandon guest-starred in numerous television programs including Gunsmoke, Archie Bunker's Place, Three's Company, Fantasy Island, Diff'rent Strokes, The Hardy Boys/Nancy Drew Mysteries, Man in a Suitcase, Frasier, All in the Family, Hazel, Little House on the Prairie, Private Practice, Murder, She Wrote, Eight Is Enough, Doctor Who, Cagney & Lacey and The Greatest American Hero. He played the recurring role of William Handler, the corrupted police captain in the final season of the ABC soap opera television series Dynasty, and from 1990 to 1991, he played Ben Maclaine, the husband of Helen Maclaine (Tippi Hedren), and the brother of Charlie Maclaine (Chuck Walling) in the CBS soap opera television series The Bold and the Beautiful. He also played Ken Mahoney in the NBC soap opera television series Days of Our Lives. He also appeared in films such as Scarface, The Adventures of Rocky and Bullwinkle, The Brink's Job, Saved by the Bell: Wedding in Las Vegas, Racing with the Moon, The Broken Hearts Club and Battle Beneath the Earth.

Brandon retired from acting in 2007, last appearing in the ABC medical drama television series Private Practice.

== Death ==
Brandon died on August 25, 2014, in Middle Village, New York, at the age of 85. He was buried at St. John Cemetery.
