= Michal Suchánek =

Canadian actor (born 1965)

- Born: 27 October 1987 (age 37); Czechoslovakia
- Occupation: Actor
- Years active: 1996 - 2008

Michal Suchánek (born 27 October 1987) is a Canadian actor, born in the former Czechoslovakia.

== Biography ==
Suchánek debuted in his first role in The Nutcracker.

He has also appeared on TV movies and programs, such as Sleepwalkers, X-Files, Hope Island, Zalinda's Story, Dirty Little Secret, Noah, Unconditional Love (TV), Y2K, and Pelts. He appeared in HBO's Edison: The Wizard of Light for which he received an Emmy nomination.

He was nominated for a Young Artist Award in connection with his performance in Aftershock: Earthquake in New York, mini-series.

== Filmography ==
- The Andromeda Strain (2008) (TV) .... Lance Stone
- Aliens vs. Predator: Requiem (2007) .... Nick
- Masters of Horror: Pelts (2006) .... Larry Jameson
- Various Positions (2002) .... Tzvi Szchevisky
- Big Brother Trouble (2000) .... Mitch Dobson
- Y2K (1999) (TV) .... Donny Cromwell
- Aftershock: Earthquake in New York (1999) (TV) .... Danny Thorell
- Dudley Do-Right (1999) .... Ten Year Old Boy
- A Murder on Shadow Mountain (1999) (TV) .... Kurt Traynor
- Noah (1998) (TV) .... Benny Waters
- Dirty Little Secret (1998) (TV) .... Charlie Ramer
- Edison: The Wizard of Light (1998) (TV) .... Young Jack Maloney
