= Aftershock: Earthquake in New York =

1999 miniseries directed by Mikael Salomon

- DVD cover
- Based on: Aftershock by Chuck Scarborough
- Teleplay by: Paul Eric Myers; David Stevens; Loren Boothby
- Directed by: Mikael Salomon
- Starring: Tom Skerritt; Sharon Lawrence; Charles S. Dutton; Lisa Nicole Carson; Jennifer Garner; Rachel Ticotin; Frederick Weller
- Theme music composer: Irwin Fisch
- Countries of origin: United States; Germany
- Original language: English
- No. of episodes: 2

Production
- Cinematography: David R. Hardberger; Jon Joffin
- Editor: Christopher Rouse
- Running time: 170 minutes

Original release
- Network: CBS
- Release: November 14 – November 16, 1999

Aftershock: Earthquake in New York is a 1999 miniseries that was broadcast in the United States on CBS in two parts, with the first part aired on November 14 and the second on November 16. It was released to VHS in 2000, and on DVD in 2001. It is based on a book written by Chuck Scarborough. Starring Charles S. Dutton, Sharon Lawrence, Tom Skerritt, Lisa Nicole Carson, Jennifer Garner, Rachel Ticotin and Frederick Weller. Under the direction of Mikael Salomon, the miniseries follows five groups of people in the aftermath of a large earthquake destroying New York City.

It was nominated for an Emmy Award for its special effects. While critics praised the special effects and cast, they panned the film for its implausible scenario, predictability, and lack of realism.

== Plot ==
While Dori Thorell (Sharon Lawrence) and her 9-year-old son, Danny (Michal Suchánek), eat breakfast, Sam Thorell (Garwin Sanford) calls from his business trip. Ballerina Diane Agostini (Jennifer Garner) is on the phone with her father when a blender shakes off the counter. Dismissing it, she ends the call and rushes off to a rehearsal session at the New York City Ballet. She is scolded for being late. Public defender Evie Lincoln (Lisa Nicole Carson) talks with her client Joshua Bingham (JR Bourne) about his case. That evening, tremors cause a gas leak at Diane's apartment complex. Though the electricity is still on in the evacuated building, Fire Chief Thomas Ahearn (Tom Skerritt) sends his crew inside. The building explodes, killing several men. At a party at Gracie Mansion, Evie's grandmother Emily Lincoln (Cicely Tyson) chastises her for being late. Her father, Mayor Bruce Lincoln (Charles S. Dutton), coerces her into going to a job interview at a big law firm.

The next day, Ahearn drops his daughter, Christine, off at high school. She expresses annoyance at his quitting to get "revenge" against the "stupid" mayor over budgeting issues. At the courthouse, Joshua is found not guilty of murdering his invalid wife. Diane meets her father for lunch to get money. When she leaves, she catches a cab driven by recent Russian immigrant Nikolai Karvoski (Fred Weller). A massive earthquake hits the city, toppling many buildings and structures. Nikolai's cab is smashed by falling debris, forcing Nikolai and Diane to flee down the street. A gas main explodes as the sidewalk pushes up between them. Diane saves his life after he falls and catches on fire. In the subway tunnel, the train Evie and Joshua are riding derails after the tunnel collapses. After the earthquake stops, Diane, accompanied by Nikolai, goes back to the restaurant and finds her father fatally injured. He dies after telling her he is proud of her. In the subway, Joshua wants to leave the badly injured driver and any other survivors to get out, but before he can convince Evie and the others to leave they hear someone calling for help.

Chief Ahearn returns to his fire station to find the building partially collapsed. With the central dispatch system down, he contacts Jillian Parnell (Erika Eleniak-Goglia), a reporter for WCBS-TV, who is flying over the city, to get an update on the situation. Both 1 Police Plaza and City Hall have collapsed, and he asks them to come pick him up. At the church, an injured Emily wakes up to find a teenage boy (Ray J) that she helped get a job there is searching her wallet, but moves to try to find a way out after seeing she is still alive. Despite her protests, Nikolai initially remains with Diane as she tries to find her mother, but they eventually part ways. Ahearn sees that his daughter's school has collapsed, but continues on to Central Park where a temporary camp is being set up. He finds the Mayor and they agree to ignore Ahearn's resignation and put aside their differences to help the citizens of their city. A large break in the sewer is causing hundreds of gallons of water to begin flooding into the subway system.

Ahearn goes to his daughter's school after learning there are survivors. Christine is among the three survivors, but she dies during an aftershock before they can free her. At the church, Emily learns that the boy has no name, just a street name. She asks him to take the name of her late son, Clayton, who died as a baby. Shortly after, he is able to escape through a break in the ceiling and get help. Dori arrives at Danny's school where she learns he is stuck on the top floor and rescue efforts are failing. Sam arrives as Dori prepares to scale the building to save their son. Diane finds looters in her mother's apartment, but Nikolai arrives and finds a note saying her mother is at a friends. The mayor arrives at the hospital where he learns his mother is dead. He thanks Clayton for trying to help her and asks Ahearn to try to help the boy, who is despondent over not being able to save her.

In the subway, Joshua, Evie, and one other survivor, Allen (Roger R. Cross), break from the others and find a ladder out. Joshua climbs up, followed by Evie. As Allen is climbing, Joshua breaks the ladder. He confirms Evie's growing suspicions that he did kill his wife and attacks her. When he hears someone coming, he tries to escape up another ladder but an aftershock breaks it and he is killed. Evie points her rescuers to where the other survivors are waiting. Dori successfully climbs the school, where Danny has to jump into her arms. The cable breaks, but they land safely on an inflated mat below and are reunited with Sam.

A year later, the city is shown still being rebuilt; Mayor Lincoln and Ahearn are now close friends; Dori and Sam are shown teaching Danny how to rock-climb; and Diane is a prima ballerina and married to Nikolai.

== Production ==
The film is based on a novel written by New York City news anchorman Chuck Scarborough. He wrote the book to note that while a quake of the size in his story is extremely unlikely in the Big Apple, it is technically not impossible and preparation should not be completely absent from local disaster plans.

Aftershock: Earthquake in New York cost RHI Entertainment (formerly Hallmark) $20 million dollars to produce. It was filmed in Vancouver, Canada, with digital effects and models used to simulate New York City. In the film, the Statue of Liberty is destroyed by the earthquake, an effect that required the special effects team to construct a 24-foot-tall fiberglass model. It took six weeks to complete the model, then on the first shoot, the model fell in the wrong direction and had to be recreated. Model trains were used to produce most of the subway-derailments. For the subway car's final tipping scene, the actors were harnessed into a life-sized subway car which was rigged to tip over on command. Actress Lisa Nicole Carson quipped that the harness was "like something you'd find in an S&M store".

As part of her preparation for the role of Diane Agostini, actress Jennifer Garner had to have her ears pierced especially for the very first time at the age of 27. After filming was completed, she then stopped wearing earrings and allowed the piercings to close up again.

== Release ==
Aftershock: Earthquake in New York was initially aired in the United States in 1999 on CBS as a two-part, four-hour miniseries. The first part aired Sunday, November 14, and the second followed on Tuesday, November 16. It was released to VHS format by Hallmark Entertainment on October 17, 2000; and on Region 1 DVD by Artisan Entertainment on February 20, 2001.

The miniseries aired in Germany as Aftershock - Das große Beben. It was released, under the title New York - Der Jüngste Tag, in a two-tape VHS format and a single disc DVD by WVG Medien in April 2001.

== Reception ==
In 2000, Aftershock: Earthquake in New York was nominated for the Emmy Award for Outstanding Special Visual Effects. Michal Suchánek was nominated for a 1999 Young Artist Award in the "Best Performance in a TV Movie or Pilot - Young Actor Age Ten or Under" category.

Sight & Sound's Danny Leigh felt the film was "predictabl[y] histrionic", excessively long, and "geologically improbabl[e]". Ray Richmond of Variety found the film to be "roundly insipid" and a "mope opera that follows such a well-trod crisis path that viewers can set their watches by". Though he highly praised the film's special effects as being "sharp and impactful without being at all obtrusive", and noted the film had a talented cast, he panned the story for being unrealistic and lacking genuineness. The New York Times Ron Wertheimer felt the numerous subplots left the film feeling fragmented and confusing, and that it presented New York in an unrealistic light, even before the earthquake hits. Noting that the film has "hints of heartfelt drama, flashes of compelling characters, [and] echoes of true connection," he felt some of the film's best moments came in its smaller scenes. He criticized Lawrence's performance, but praised Dutton and Skerrit's, particularly their interactions together, stating "their scenes provide a strong argument for letting television drama do what it does best: focus on the details of human interaction."

Tom Shales of The Washington Post gave the film a more positive review, calling it "one of the best disaster movies ever made for television" and a "fabulously entertaining ordeal". He praised the characters for being sympathetic, the actors for portraying them well, and director Salomon for his skill in building the film's suspense.

== See also ==
- Earthquake activity in the New York City area
