= Another Dumb Blonde =

2000 single by Hoku

Single by Hoku

from the album Snow Day: Music from the Motion Picture and Hoku
- Released: February 15, 2000
- Genre: Dance-pop
- Length: 3:53
- Label: Geffen
- Songwriters: Antonina Armato; Tim James
- Producer: Antonina Armato

Hoku singles chronology
"Another Dumb Blonde" (2000)	"How Do I Feel (The Burrito Song)" (2000)

"Another Dumb Blonde" is a song by American singer Hoku, released as her debut single on February 15, 2000. It was originally included on the soundtrack to the 2000 Nickelodeon theatrical film Snow Day, and was released as a single from the soundtrack by Geffen Records. It was later included on Hoku's eponymous debut album. The song reached number 27 on the US Billboard Hot 100 and number 47 in New Zealand.

== Chart performance ==
"Another Dumb Blonde" peaked at number 27 on the US Billboard Hot 100, becoming Hoku's first and only song to reach the top 40. It sold 600,000 copies domestically, making it the 14th-best-selling commercial single of 2000.

== Music video ==
Directed by Tryan George, the video focuses on Hoku emailing a video to her ex-boyfriend telling him that she's not interested in him anymore. She shoots the video with her friends and new boyfriend at a beach party. Actors Mark Webber, Schuyler Fisk and Emmanuelle Chriqui (from Snow Day) appear in the video. Intercut in the video are scenes of Hoku and some dancers dancing behind a winter mountain background and scenes from the film that focus on the romantic subplot.

== Charts ==
=== Weekly charts ===
Weekly chart performance for "Another Dumb Blonde"
Chart (2000)	Peak position
New Zealand (Recorded Music NZ)	47
US Billboard Hot 100	27
US Pop Airplay (Billboard)	29

=== Decade-end charts ===
Decade-end chart performance for "Another Dumb Blonde"
Chart (2000–2009)	Position
US Hot Singles Sales (Billboard)	26
