= Hoku =

American singer (born 1981)

- Born: Hoku Christian Ho; June 10, 1981 (age 45); Oahu, Hawaii, U.S.
- Other name: Hoku Ho Clements
- Education: La Pietra
- Occupations: Singer, actress
- Years active: 1999–present
- Spouse: Jeremy Clements (m. 1999)
- Children: 3
- Parents: Don Ho; Patricia Swallie Choy
- Musical career
- Genres: Bubblegum pop; teen pop; Europop; Christian
- Labels: Geffen; Interscope; Ola Vista
- Website: hokumusic.com

Hoku Ho Clements (born June 10, 1981) is an American singer and actress. She is best known for her 2000 single "Another Dumb Blonde", from the soundtrack and film Snow Day, which peaked at number 27 on the Billboard Hot 100, as well as the single "Perfect Day", which appeared on the soundtrack of the hit comedy film Legally Blonde and was added to Contemporary hit radio in June 2001.

== Early life ==
Hoku was born Hoku Christian Ho on June 10, 1981, on the island of Oahu (the most populous of the Hawaiian Islands), the daughter of entertainer Don Ho and Patricia Swallie. Her given name, Hoku, is the Hawaiian word for star. Her father was hapa, of Native Hawaiian, Chinese, Portuguese, German, and Dutch descent. She has one full sibling, a younger sister named Kaimana, and eight half-siblings. For a time, Clements lived in the affluent Honolulu neighborhood of Diamond Head, with Don, Patricia, Kaimana, Don's ex-girlfriend Elizabeth Guevara, and Don and Elizabeth's two daughters.

Hoku frequently performed with her father, who taught her how to write songs, as a child. She was initially unaware of her father's fame, learning from people's reactions after realizing who her father was. "I thought everyone's parents had shows at night," she said. She graduated from La Pietra.

== Career ==
Hoku credits her father for her discovery. "People helped me a lot, because of who my dad was," she said. She caught the attention of songwriter and producer Antonina Armato, who encouraged her to move to Los Angeles to meet with other producers. "She has a pure voice," Armato said. "I don't have to doctor it and use all the tricks of the studio." Hoku was attending Point Loma Nazarene University in San Diego, dropping her last name when she moved from Hawaii, when she was offered a recording contract from Interscope Records. Armato assisted Hoku in securing the deal, and Ho insisted that he and his lawyers review it before she signed. "I didn't want her signing something that wasn't good," he said.

Hoku's debut single, "Another Dumb Blonde" (the theme song to the 2000 film Snow Day), was released on January 18, 2000. A day after its music video premiered on MTV, it was the network's tenth most-requested video. The song was a top ten sales hit in the United States and peaked at number 27 on the Billboard Hot 100, additionally charting at number 47 in New Zealand. Shocked by the single's success, Hoku dropped out of Point Loma Nazarene and began recording her first album Hoku (2000). The album was released on April 18, 2000, by Geffen and Interscope Records and peaked at number 151 on the Billboard 200.

Hoku had planned to work on a second album for Interscope after the March 2001 release of her single "Perfect Day" to radio, a track which appeared on the soundtrack of the hit comedy film Legally Blonde, and served as the film's theme song and was officially added to Contemporary hit radio in June 2001. The song marked a transition from her earlier bubblegum teen pop sound toward a more guitar-driven, pop-rock sound. "No one really knew that Legally Blonde was going to be what it was, Literally, [my label heads] were like, 'This movie's not going to become anything.' And then the next thing you know, it's like, this iconic movie. And my song opens it!" Hoku said in an interview with Billboard. "Sitting in the premiere and hearing my song open the movie, and everyone's cheering – it felt like, 'I've really arrived now, folks.'" Despite these successes, she struggled to find a niche in the pop music industry and left her label, disagreeing with them regarding her image and marketing, which she felt clashed with her Pentecostal Christian upbringing. After leaving her record label and shelving her sophomore album, Hoku auditioned for the role of Lorraine Baker in the 2003 remake of Cheaper by the Dozen (2003 film), but she lost the role to Hilary Duff. She wrote and funded an EP, Listen Up, which was released on August 1, 2008, through the singer's own Ola Vista Records. She opened for Gwen Stefani's Neal S. Blaisdell Center shows of The Sweet Escape Tour later that month. In March 2018, she decided to return to her music and release an EP titled Called by Name. Unlike her previous works, this is her first Christian EP.

In September 2019, Ho performed at The Mission North Shore Church in Haleʻiwa, Hawaii.

== Musical style and artistry ==
Jason Lynch of People has called bubblegum pop Hoku's speciality. Hoku's AllMusic page lists her musical styles as teen pop and Europop. She has been frequently compared to fellow pop singers Christina Aguilera and Britney Spears, however, Charlotte Dillon of AllMusic has noted Hoku's distinct style, attributing it to the singer's Christian faith. "It's not very comfortable for me to be a sex symbol, especially because of my faith," Hoku has said. "That's why I enjoy being involved with the younger kids, because they relate to me being the girl next door." In his review of Hoku, Stephen Thomas Erlewine wrote, "Sure, it's commercial – that's what teen pop is all about – but never once do the record makers decide to push Hoku as a nymphet. Her songs are never sexual the way those of Britney Spears and Christina Aguilera surely are." Erlewine also noted that her young-sounding voice made it appropriate that her music was "targeted toward middle-school daydreams and junior-high dances".

== Personal life ==
Hoku became a Christian after first attending church in 1995 and she has said nothing means more to her than music outside of her family and faith. In 1999, shortly after her 18th birthday, she married 21-year-old Jeremy Clements, who she started dating while she was in high school. The couple eloped "for personal reasons", according to Hoku, later saying that she was scared to tell her father because of his harsh attitude towards boys she previously dated and how young she was at the time. Hoku and her husband Jeremy have three children and served as Arts and Worship Architects at Branches Church in Dana Point, California from 2010-2019.

== Discography ==
=== Studio albums ===
Title	Album details	Peak chart positions	
Title	Album details	US	US Heat
Hoku	Released: April 18, 2000; Label: Geffen, Interscope; Formats: CD, cassette, digital download	151	8

=== EPs ===
Title	Album details
Listen Up	Released: August 1, 2008; Label: Ola Vista; Formats: CD, digital download; Track listing: 1. "If You Don't Want My Love" – 3:27; 2. "Saturday Morning" – 3:33; 3. "Closer" – 3:36; 4. "All I Need" – 3:19; 5. "Listen Up" – 3:39
Called by Name	Released March 25, 2018; Label: HokuMusic.com; Format: Digital download; Track listing: 1. "Called by Name" – 4:00; 2. "I See You Now" – 3:57; 3. "You" – 3:45; 4. "Your Will Be Done" – 4:48; 5. "Many Oceans" – 5:16

=== Singles ===
Title	Year	Peak chart positions			Album
Title	Year	US	US Pop	NZ	Album
"Another Dumb Blonde"	2000	27	29	47	Hoku and Snow Day: Music from the Motion Picture
"Perfect Day"	2001	—	—	—	Legally Blonde: Original Motion Picture Soundtrack
"O Holy Night (Hallelujah)"	2017	—	—	—	
"The World Slept On"	2019	—	—	—	
"Greater"	2020	—	—	—	
"—" denotes a recording that did not chart or was not released in that territory.

=== Music videos ===
- "Another Dumb Blonde" (2000)
- "How Do I Feel" (2000)
- "Perfect Day" (2001)

== Filmography ==
=== Film ===
Year	Movie	Role
2002	Nancy Drew	Bitsy
2003	Arizona Summer	Shawn

=== Television ===
Year	Show	Note
2000	98 Degrees and Hoku in Concert	Disney Channel in Concert
2000	Hollywood Squares	As herself - Panelist on September 5, 2000 - Teen People Week!
2000	In a Heartbeat	As herself in Episode 1.9 (October 14, 2000) "A Night to Remember."
2001	World Music Awards	As a performer.
2007	NightTime With Andy Bumatai	As herself, Late night talk show guest.
