= Snow Day (2000 film) =

2000 American comedy film by Chris Koch

- Theatrical release poster
- Directed by: Chris Koch
- Written by: Will McRobb; Chris Viscardi
- Produced by: Albie Hecht; Julia Pistor
- Starring: Chris Elliott; Mark Webber; Jean Smart; Chevy Chase
- Cinematography: Robbie Greenberg
- Edited by: David Finfer
- Music by: Steve Bartek
- Production company: Nickelodeon Movies
- Distributed by: Paramount Pictures
- Release dates: January 29, 2000 (Paramount Theatre); February 11, 2000 (United States)
- Running time: 89 minutes
- Country: United States
- Language: English
- Budget: $13 million
- Box office: $62.5 million

Snow Day is a 2000 American comedy film directed by Chris Koch, written by Will McRobb and Chris Viscardi, and produced by Paramount Pictures and Nickelodeon Movies. It was originally conceived as a follow-up to The Adventures of Pete & Pete, but it was eventually rewritten to be independent of the show instead. It stars Chris Elliott, Mark Webber, Jean Smart, and Chevy Chase with supporting roles by Schuyler Fisk, Pam Grier, Zena Grey, Josh Peck, Emmanuelle Chriqui, and David Paetkau. The film premiered on January 29, 2000, and was theatrically released on February 11, 2000. It takes place during the events of a record snow day in upstate New York, depicting various subplots including a group of kids planning to thwart a snowplow driver in an attempt to get a second snow day. This is the first of two films to star both Peck and Grey, the other being Max Keeble's Big Move, released the following year.

Snow Day was met with generally negative reviews but was a box office success. The soundtrack single "Another Dumb Blonde", by Hoku, was her only chart hit, peaking at #27 on the Billboard Hot 100. The film was released on home video on October 3, 2000, and re-released on DVD on September 26, 2017.

A musical remake was released on December 16, 2022, on Paramount+.

== Plot ==
Despite an unusually warm season, a snow storm descends upon Syracuse, New York, leaving the Brandston family's neighborhood covered in a blanket of snow. Tom, the local weatherman and father of Hal, Natalie, and Randy who works for Channel 6, is involved in a rivalry with Chad Symmonz, a weatherman from another station. Even though Tom predicted the previous night's snowstorm first, Chad is taking credit for the news. His wife Laura is a workaholic, but cannot make it into work as she and youngest son Randy are severely snowed in. Stuck at home with Randy, she eventually takes her mind off work and lets loose with her son in the snow. Principal Ken Weaver is targeted by snowballs.

Meanwhile, Hal plans to spend the day trying to win over his crush Claire Bonner, the school's most popular girl who has just broken up with her loud jock boyfriend Chuck, after Hal found Claire's sperm whale anklet in the swimming pool. His best friend Lane Leonard expresses disbelief at his plan, reasoning to him that love is about finding someone you can stand to be around for more than ten minutes at a time, but she agrees to accompany him on his mission. Hal tries everything from reaching out to Claire live on his dad's news station and facing off with Chuck in a snowmobile chase.

Natalie plans to use the magic of the snow day to take on her archenemy Snowplowman, a local villain who is said to run over kids and plow the streets so efficiently that there has never been a second snow day in years. With her friends Chet Felker and Wayne Alworth, Natalie tricks Snowplowman into thinking Wayne is dead in the street. The diversion works as Snowplowman leaves the plow to investigate, and she sneaks inside the plow. Natalie is attacked by his bird Trudy, so she kidnaps the violent creature. Snowplowman retaliates by grabbing Wayne. Snowplowman agrees to swap with Natalie. She will get Wayne back and a second snow day in exchange for the bird. However, Snowplowman goes back on his word following the exchange and continues on his route to plow the snow. Natalie is about to give up when she devises a plan. Tom is able to prove Chad is a fraud when he's unable to answer basic meteorology questions on air, proving he discovered the storm first. With Chad exposed and fleeing, Tom wins back his status.

When Hal shows no signs of giving up, he ropes Lane into attracting Claire to a snow art of a sperm whale where he finds out that she actually likes zebras. After Hal dodges Chuck's group, Lane gets angry with him and admits she hasn't done what she wants to do for the snow day. When Hal asks what is it, she kisses him and leaves. He later meets up with Claire at the school's pool where she kisses him, but Hal realizes that he doesn't have feelings for Claire and he has stronger feelings for Lane. Claire encourages Hal to go after her.

Later that night, Natalie faces off with Snowplowman alone. He taunts her, but she reveals an army of kids have united to stop him. The kids tie him to a street sign and commandeer his plow, restoring the snow onto the roads.

In search of Lane, Hal is attacked by Chuck. A fight ensues, but Hal is saved when Natalie and friends plow Chuck away into a snow bank with the plow. Hal is impressed with Natalie's accomplishment of her mission and says he wants to spend the soon-to-be second snow day with her.

Hal finds Lane at the local skating rink and apologizes to her. He repeats her line about true love being about finding someone you can stand to be around for ten minutes, and then asks her "You got ten minutes?" They kiss. The Brandstons, Lane, and Claire have found new paths in their lives. As for Principal Weaver, he made it inside his house only for his unseen assailants to pelt him with snowballs.

== Cast ==
- Zena Grey as Natalie Brandston, a young girl out to preserve the snow day that happens to Syracuse.
- Mark Webber as Hal Brandston, the older brother of Natalie and Randy. He serves as the narrator of the film.
- Chevy Chase as Tom Brandston, the father of Natalie, Hal, and Randy who works as a weather man at Channel 6.
- Jean Smart as Laura Brandston, the mother of Natalie, Hal, and Randy.
- Chris Elliott as Roger Stubblefield / Snowplowman, a mean snowplow driver who has a reputation of eliminating snow days.
- Jade Yorker as Chet Felker, a friend of Natalie.
- Josh Peck as Wayne Alworth, an other friend of Natalie.
- Schuyler Fisk as Lane Leonard, the best friend of Hal who harbors feelings for him.
- Emmanuelle Chriqui as Claire Bonner, a popular teenager and expert diver who is Hal's love interest.
- David Paetkau as Chuck Wheeler, Claire's on-off boyfriend.
- Iggy Pop as Mr. Zellweger, a boring disc jockey.
- Pam Grier as Tina, the boss of Tom at Channel 6.
- John Schneider as Chad Symmonz, a weather man who is Tom's rival.
- Damian Young as Principal Ken Weaver, the principal of Natalie's school who becomes a target of snowballs on snow days which becomes a running gag throughout the film.
- Connor Matheus as Randy Brandston, the younger brother of Natalie and Hal.
- Kea Wong as Paula
- Carly Pope as Fawn
- Rozonda Thomas as Mona
- Katharine Isabelle as Marla
- Tim Paleniuk as Mailman

== Production ==
In February 1999, it was announced that Nickelodeon would produce Snow Day for Paramount Pictures. It was mostly filmed in Edmonton, Alberta, Canada. Filming commenced on February 16, 1999, and wrapped up on May 13, 1999.

== Reception ==
=== Box office ===
The film opened at number three at the North American box office, making US$14.3 million in its first weekend, behind The Beach and Scream 3, the latter of which was on its second week at the top spot. Snow Day was a box office success, earning $60,020,107 in its domestic run, and $62,464,731 worldwide.

=== Critical response ===
Review aggregation website Rotten Tomatoes reports the film holds an approval rating of 30% based on 66 reviews, with an average score of 4.26/10. The site's critical consensus reads, "Weak assembly of characters and story lines made this movie forgettable and silly." Metacritic gives it a weighted average score of 34 out of 100, based on reviews from 22 critics, indicating "generally unfavorable reviews". Audiences polled by CinemaScore gave the film an average grade of "B−" on an A+ to F scale.

In a comparison to 1983's A Christmas Story, Roger Ebert of the Chicago Sun-Times gave Snow Day 1.5 stars, calling it "an uninspired assembly of characters and story lines that interrupt one another until the battle against Snowplow Man takes over just when we're hoping he will disappear from the movie and set free the teenage romance trapped inside it." Aside from the film itself, Ebert also wrote, "What a thoughtless place is Hollywood, and what talent it must feel free to waste", in reference to Pam Grier being given another "lousy role" after her "wonderful performance" in Jackie Brown (1997). Entertainment Weekly's Owen Gleiberman wrote "Even Snow Day's winter wonderland looks fake," and gave it an F grade.

=== Accolades ===
Year	Award	Category	Recipients	Result
2000	YoungStar Awards	Best Young Actor/Performance in a Motion Picture Comedy	Mark Webber	Nominated
2001	Young Artist Awards	Best Family Feature Film – Comedy		Nominated
2001	Young Artist Awards	Best Performance in a Feature Film – Young Actor Age Ten or Under	Connor Matheus	Nominated
2001	Blockbuster Entertainment Awards	Favorite Song from a Movie (Internet Only)	Another Dumb Blonde performed by Hoku	Nominated

== Soundtrack ==
The film's soundtrack peaked at number 183 on the Billboard 200 chart.

Snow Day: Music from the Motion Picture

Soundtrack album by Various artists
- Released: February 8, 2000
- Recorded: 1999
- Length: 41:16
- Label: Geffen Records
- Producer: Various artists

Singles from Snow Day: Music from the Motion Picture
- 1. "Another Dumb Blonde" Released: January 18, 2000

Professional ratings
Review scores
Source	Rating
AllMusic	3/5 stars

No.	Title	Writer(s)	Performed by	Length
1.	"Another Dumb Blonde"	Antonina Armato, Tim James	Hoku	3:49
2.	"My Heart's Saying Now"	Paul Barry, Mark Taylor	Jordan Knight	3:50
3.	"The Reason Why"	Arnthor Birgisson, Patrick Tucker	LFO	3:46
4.	"Still"	Dave Deviller, Sean Hosein, Justin Jeffre, Drew Lachey, Nick Lachey, Jeff Timmons	98 Degrees	4:00
5.	"Picture of You"	Andrew Watkins, Paul Wilson, Eliot Kennedy, Ronan Keating	Boyzone	3:25
6.	"Lifetime Affair"	Danny O'Donoghue, Terry Daly, Wanya Morris, Mark Sheehan	Mytown	4:35
7.	"There She Goes"	Lee Mavers	Sixpence None the Richer	2:41
8.	"Come On Come On"	Greg Camp, Steve Harwell	Smash Mouth	2:32
9.	"Say You Love Me (Radio Edit)"	Sherree Ford-Payne, Rhett Lawrence, BeBe Winans	Dina Carroll	3:13
10.	"Wasting My Life"	Ariel Rechtshaid	The Hippos	2:39
11.	"Noise Brigade"	Dicky Barrett, Dennis Brockenborough, Joe Gittleman	The Mighty Mighty Bosstones	2:14
12.	"Waiting for a Girl Like You"	Lou Gramm, Mick Jones	Foreigner	4:32
Total length:				41:16

The following songs were included in the film but not featured on the soundtrack:

- Al Martino – "Love Letters", "Fascination" and "To Each His Own"
- Irving Berlin – "Heat Wave"
- Smash Mouth – "Satellite"
- Ernest Gold – "The Big W"
- Simon Chardiet – "Drag Blob"
- The Wiseguys – "Ooh La La"
- Schuyler Fisk – "It's Not Her"
- The Brian Setzer Orchestra – "Switchblade 327"

== Musical remake ==
On March 1, 2022, it was announced that a remake of the film had gone into production in Montreal. Reimagined as a musical, it stars Ky Baldwin, Jerry Trainor, Laura Bell Bundy, Rob Huebel, Michaela Russell, Shelby Simmons, and Fabi Aguirre. It was released on Nickelodeon and Paramount+ on December 16 of that same year. In June 2023, the film was removed from the service.
