= Ashley Tesoro =

American actress and singer (born 1983)

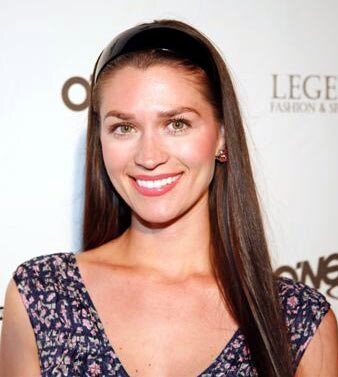
- Tesoro in 2023

Background information
- Born: Ashley Lyn Cafagna; February 15, 1983 (age 43); Iowa City, Iowa, U.S.
- Genres: Christian, gospel, country
- Occupations: Actress, singer, model
- Years active: 1994–present
- Label: Tesoro Records (2007–present)
- Website: ashleytesoro.tv

Ashley Tesoro (born Ashley Lyn Cafagna; February 15, 1983) is an American actress and singer. She is known for Mrs. Universe 23-24 and Mrs. Nevada Universe 2023. Tesoro is also known for her starring roles in NBC's Saved by the Bell: The New Class (as Liz Miller) and CBS's The Bold and the Beautiful (as Kimberly Fairchild). In 2007, she released a self-titled country music EP. In 2010 she released a country gospel EP titled Oh You Angel. In 2012, she released a gospel EP titled Simply Worship.

== Early life ==
Ashley Lyn Cafagna was born in Iowa City, Iowa, the first of three children. She was raised in Escondido, California. At the age of six, she began entering beauty pageants, and won several local pageants from ages six through eight. She was crowned "Little Miss California" at the age of eight. She then started acting in a theater company called Christian Youth Theater. At the age of ten she entered a local talent contest in San Diego, California. After a long process of acting, modeling, and interviews, she took first place out of three hundred contestants. Her win placed her with an acting agent and manager.

== Career ==
=== Acting ===
As a television actress Ashley Tesoro has appeared in NBC's Saved by the Bell: The New Class (as Liz Miller) for three seasons and CBS's The Bold and the Beautiful (as Kimberly Fairchild) for three years. She has had other roles in 7th Heaven, Valley of the Dolls, Hey Arnold!, CBS Morning News, and has been a guest host for E!. She has presented the Daytime Emmy Awards, the Soap Opera Digest Awards, and was awarded "Best Newcomer on a Daytime Television Show" in Australia. She was also named one of the "Fifty most Beautiful People" on television by Soap Opera Digest and Soap Opera Weekly. She has also starred in eight films during her career, including; The Skulls II, Lord of Illusions playing Famke Janssen's younger self, and Mr. Murder with Stephen Baldwin, Thomas Haden Church, and James Coburn.

=== Modeling ===
As a model Ashley Tesoro has worked for companies such as Radiosa Gowns, Levi's and Tommy Hilfiger. She has starred in commercial ads, and has been featured on the cover of magazines such as; Teen (Teen Beauty Guide), Soap Opera Digest, Soap Opera Weekly, CBS Soaps In Depth, and Cross Point.

=== Music ===
While starring on The Bold and the Beautiful, executive-producer Bradley Bell incorporated singing into her character of Kimberly Fairchild. She recorded several original songs and music videos for the show. One of these songs was premiered on KIIS-FM's Valentine Show. In 2007, Ashley Tesoro made her country music debut with a self-titled EP on Tesoro Records. The album was produced by Ron Aniello, mixed by Mike Shipley, and mastered by Joe Gastwirt. Larry Eagle, drummer and percussionist on Bruce Springsteen's We Shall Overcome: The Seeger Sessions, played drums on two of the EP's tracks. In 2010, she released her second EP on Tesoro Records titled Oh You Angel. This country gospel album was produced by Ron Aniello, mixed by Clif Norrell, and mastered by Joe Gastwirt. In August 2010, Ashley Tesoro opened for Jackson Browne at a private event in Santa Barbara, California. Supported by the Abiders she performed the song "Heaven Let Me Know" from her EP Oh You Angel. In 2012, she released her third EP on Tesoro Records titled Simply Worship. This A cappella and acoustic gospel album was produced by Ron Aniello and mixed and mastered by Alec Dixon.

== Personal life ==
Tesoro graduated "with honors" from the University of Phoenix. She earned degrees in psychology and communication/culture & communication.

Ashley Tesoro grew up singing in church and performing in the theater company Christian Youth Theater. She and her husband Anthony are both Christian ministers, and run the Tesoro Ministry Foundation, a non-profit charity-ministry foundation founded by Anthony in 2000. She is the co-writer of Life Is For Living; a Christian ministry and lifestyle blog, and the co-host of Life Is For Living TV a Christian ministry and lifestyle web series.

Ashley enjoys training in the martial arts and has earned red belts in Combat Karate and American Tang Soo Do from her husband Anthony Tesoro who is a lifelong martial artist and former karate instructor. She has trained in boxing, kickboxing, Karate, Tang Soo Do, and grappling.

=== Marriage and family ===
On September 30, 2001, Ashley Cafagna married Anthony Tesoro, a Christian minister. Anthony formerly worked on Wall Street for Paine Webber and then Jones Institutional Trading Services before entering the non-profit sector and founding ministry/charity organization the Tesoro Ministry Foundation, Inc. in 2000. In 2005, Ashley and her husband Anthony founded Tesoro Entertainment, a production company; and in 2007, they launched Tesoro Entertainment's music label division, Tesoro Records; with the Christian music sub-label Sacred Music launching in 2012. Their daughter, Gabriella Lyn, was born on November 18, 2013; and their son Anthony John, was born December 24, 2015.

== Discography ==
=== Albums ===
Year	Name	Label	Producer	Executive producer
2012	Simply Worship EP	Tesoro Records	Ron Aniello	Anthony Tesoro
2010	Oh You Angel EP	Tesoro Records	Ron Aniello	Anthony Tesoro
2007	Ashley Tesoro EP	Tesoro Records	Ron Aniello	Anthony Tesoro

=== Singles ===
Year	Name	Label	Producer	Executive producer	Other info
1999	Evermore	No Limit	Erik Hicks	Bradley Bell	Debuted on KIIS-FM 7/16/99

=== Music videos ===
Year	Song name	Label	Location	Video producer	Other info
2012	I'll Stand By You	Tesoro Records	Santa Barbara, CA	Anthony Tesoro	
2012	Blessed Assurance	Tesoro Records	Santa Barbara, CA	Anthony Tesoro	
2012	Come Just as You Are	Tesoro Records	Santa Barbara, CA	Anthony Tesoro	
2012	I'd Rather Have Jesus	Tesoro Records	Santa Barbara, CA	Anthony Tesoro	
2012	As the Deer	Tesoro Records	Santa Barbara, CA	Anthony Tesoro	
2012	Amazing Grace	Tesoro Records	Santa Barbara, CA	Anthony Tesoro	
1999	Evermore	No Limit	Los Angeles; CA	Bell-Phillips/CBS	Debuted on the Bold & Beautiful Friday, 7/16/99

== Filmography ==
=== Film ===
Year	Title	Role	Notes
1994	Lost Island	Shelley	
1995	Lord of Illusions	Dorothea Swann (young)	
1996	Demon in the Bottle	Amanda	
1997	Mystery Monsters	Susie	
1997	The Midas Touch	Hannah	Direct-to-video film
1998	The Werewolf Reborn!	Eleanore Crane	
2002	The Skulls II	Ali	Direct-to-video film

=== Television ===
Year	Title	Role	Notes
1994	Valley of the Dolls	Young Anne	Episode 1.29
1997	7th Heaven	Joanne	Episode: "I Hate You"
1997	Hey Arnold!	Older Girl on Bus	Voice role; episode: "Eating Contest/Rhonda's Glasses"
1997–2000	Saved by the Bell: The New Class	Liz Miller	Main role (seasons 5–7)
1998	Mr. Murder	Autograph Girl at Airport	Television miniseries
1998–2001	The Bold and the Beautiful	Kimberly Fairchild	Regular role

== Honors and awards ==
=== Honors ===
- The Honorable Order of Kentucky Colonels
  - 2009 - Honorary Kentucky Colonel for service and contributions to the global community - honoree
- Soap Opera Digest
  - 1999 - Soap Opera's 50 Most Beautiful People - recipient
- Soap Opera Weekly
  - 1999 - Soap Opera's 50 Most Beautiful People - recipient

=== Awards ===
- Young Artist Awards
  - 2002 - Best Performance in a TV Drama Series - Leading Young Actress for The Bold and the Beautiful - nominated
  - 2001 - Best Performance in a Daytime TV Series - Young Actress for The Bold and the Beautiful - nominated
  - 2000 - Best Performance in a TV Comedy Series - Supporting Young Actress for Saved by the Bell: The New Class - nominated
- YoungStar Awards (The Hollywood Reporter's Annual YoungStar Awards)
  - 2000 - Best Young Actress/Performance in a Saturday Morning TV Series for Saved by the Bell: The New Class - nominated
  - 2000 - Best Young Actress/Performance in a Daytime TV Series for The Bold and the Beautiful - nominated
  - 1999 - Best Performance by a Young Actress in a Saturday Morning TV Program for Saved by the Bell: The New Class - nominated
  - 1999 - Best Performance by a Young Actress in a Daytime TV Program for The Bold and the Beautiful - nominated
- Inside Soap Awards
  - 1999 - Best Newcomer for The Bold and the Beautiful - winner
