= Kimberly Fairchild =

- The Bold and the Beautiful character
- Portrayed by: Ashley Tesoro
- Duration: 1998–2001
- First appearance: November 23, 1998
- Last appearance: January 26, 2001
- Introduced by: Bradley Bell
In-universe information
- Occupation: Model
- Father: Adam Alexander
- Half-sisters: Macy Alexander

Kimberly Fairchild is a fictional character from the CBS Daytime soap opera, The Bold and the Beautiful. She was portrayed by Ashley Tesoro from 1998 to 2001.

== Casting ==
Ashley Tesoro joined The Bold and the Beautiful as Kimberly in 1998, when she was 15-years-old. The character was introduced as the "good girl" love interest of Rick Forrester (Jacob Young). Tesoro left the soap at the end of her contract when she was 18. Following her departure, Tesoro received offers to appear in other soap operas.

Tesoro was often asked about returning to The Bold and the Beautiful, and at one point had a meeting with Bradley Bell about it. Tesoro revealed that after speaking to Young and Bell about how to bring the character back, it did not come to fruition due to creative differences, explaining, "Kimberly was a pure and wholesome character, but eventually she turned a little dark. I think there has to be some character who stands for integrity and I don't see a lot of that on the show anymore. I'm not saying let's make her a Christian minister, but maybe she could come back having done some kind of philanthropy. I wanted to bring her back to her roots and said, 'If you want a good, wholesome character, bring me back, but I can't be parading around in lingerie and doing salacious love scenes. It has to be done a certain way.' So, we were discussing it, and I was open and they were open. But, I don't think it was something they wanted to embrace and it didn't come together. I have a great respect for Brad and Jacob and still have very good working relationships with both of them".

== Storylines ==
Kimberly Fairchild is the daughter of Myles Fairchild. Her mother died, and she and Myles moved to Los Angeles from Nantucket (where she was born and raised) into James and Maggie Warwick's old home. They were introduced to society at a party at Brooke Logan's home where Kimberly was immediately smitten with Rick. She enrolled in Meadow Woods High School, like Rick, and it wasn't long before the two were study buddies.

Kimberly fell for Rick, who seemed to share her views on waiting for the right person before going 'all the way'. She was confused when she met Amber, who warned her to keep away from Rick. Kimberly was devastated to learn that Rick had a girlfriend. Kimberly's resistance didn't last long. She was soon back in the thick of things with Rick. After Amber warned her to stop chasing Rick again, Kimberly decided to pull out all the stops to destroy Rick and Amber's relationship. Kimberly was encouraged when Brooke explained that Amber was a gold-digger and a tramp and Eric begged for her help in breaking up Rick and Amber. She soon began dating C.J. casually as a way of staying close to Rick. Although Kimberly toyed with the idea of leaving town, she eventually decided that it was far more important to be there for Rick.

When Amber nearly lost the baby after another fight with Kimberly, Kimberly told Rick that she couldn't continue to cause problems for Amber and hurt the baby. She secured a promise from Amber that she would do her best to make Rick happy, but Kimberly's best intentions nearly fell by the wayside when Amber missed the wedding rehearsal and Kimberly had to stand in for her. Kimberly was heartbroken as she watched Rick and Amber exchange their vows.

When Kimberly learned Macy was her sister, Kimberly was devastated that her father had a life that didn't include her. She ran away, staying with her friend Alexis until Rick convinced her to go home. Once Kimberly learned that there was a possibility that Amber's baby may not be Rick's, she was more determined than ever to pursue a future with him. C.J. tried to warn her against the idea and she promised that if the baby was Rick's she'd walk away. She was beginning to accept Macy as her sister and the two were growing closer. Once Rick announced that he forgave Amber even though the baby could have been Raymond's, Kimberly accepted dates from C.J., and even kissed C.J. in an attempt to make Rick jealous. Her suspicion of Amber grew and she found it impossible to stay away from Rick.

Kimberly was thrilled when Brooke chose her to be Forrester's newest model. While modeling the show-stopper, the back of the dress was caught on a hook on the runway. When the back ripped off, Kimberly was left utterly humiliated. This began a war between the Spectras and the Forresters. The Spectras were convinced the Forresters did it to humiliate Kimberly while the Forresters were convinced the Spectras did it to ruin the show. The incident was soon overshadowed when Macy and Thorne broke up over it, and Kimberly began to resent Brooke, who she felt seduced Thorne to destroy his relationship with her sister. After finally putting C.J. off once and for all, Kimberly returned to pursuing Rick, even encouraging him to divorce Amber so they could be together. When she saw how Amber didn't want Becky near the baby, she pushed Rick to find out why. Despite her disapproval of what Brooke did to her half-sister, Kimberly accepted a modeling position with Forrester when Brooke offered it as they both knew it was Brooke's way of trying to come between Rick and Amber.

Kimberly then met Giovanni, a new Forrester photographer, who was quite taken with her. She shared a few kisses with Giovanni but was unable to forget Rick. When she got a phone call from a 'reporter' asking a lot of pointed questions about Rick and Amber's marriage, she was more determined than ever to be with Rick. After sharing a few kisses with the married Rick, Kimberly left for Paris to meet Becky, determined to use her to bring an end to Rick and Amber. She told Becky that Amber and Rick's marriage was a complete mistake and that she was the only woman Rick loved. After returning to the U.S., she confronted Amber, only to have her mother Tawny pull a gun on her.

Rick finally admitted to Kimberly that he loved her but asked her to accept his marriage to Amber. She refused and pushed Becky to expose whatever dirt she had on Amber. Kimberly continued to pursue Rick, and he admitted that he wasn't in love with Amber. After months of nothing happening, Kimberly realized she wasn't going to get what she wanted so she quit modeling and told Rick to move on with Amber. She sought comfort with Giovanni and allowed him to show her around Venice.

Kimberly returned to L.A. to find that Amber and Rick's marriage was as good as over. Amber's secret (that her child had died and Little Eric was really Becky's son) was out, and Rick wanted to pursue a real relationship with Kimberly. Rick was a great comfort to her when Adam had to leave Los Angeles without saying goodbye to her. Although his marriage was over, Kimberly still wasn't willing to sleep with Rick. She planned to remain a virgin until her wedding night. She and Rick began to date, and it wasn't long before Kimberly realized that Amber was working as a waitress. Kimberly taunted Amber and was thrilled when she nearly got Amber fired from her job. She began feeling jealous of even chance encounters between Rick and Amber, and when she realized that Rick supported Brooke and Thorne's relationship even though Thorne was married to her half-sister, she called things off. When she realized Macy was drinking again, she wasn't sure what to do, and went to Sally for help. She was shocked when Macy admitted to her that Thorne wanted a divorce, and Brooke bore the brunt of her frustrations. When Macy died in a car accident after Brooke tried to deliver divorce papers to her up at Big Bear, Kimberly was devastated, and blamed Brooke.

In her grief, Kimberly began getting closer and closer to Thorne. She appreciated his being there for her, and begged him not to marry Brooke right after Macy's death. She soon became attracted to Thorne, and she tries to seduce him away from Brooke. Kimberly kisses Thorne backstage at a fashion show, and Bridget (who also opposed Brooke's relationship with Thorne, and she teamed up with Kimberly to separate them) raises the curtain so the public see. Kimberly also takes advantage of an inebriated Thorne by lying that they'd had sex. Kimberly tries to kill Brooke twice: one by pushing her out of the window and second by rigging a photographer's light to fall on her. Kimberly brushed the try of Rick to get close to her again, and she asks Giovanni (who showed interest in Brooke) to help her to keep Thorne and Brooke separated. Giovanni agree, but their actions was fail. After watching Thorne and Brooke exchange their vows, Kimberly went back to the beach house Macy left to her. Adam showed up one day to take her away from Los Angeles.

== Reception ==
A writer from Soaps She Knows called Kimberly "beautiful".
