= National Lampoon Presents Dorm Daze =

- Theatrical release poster
- Directed by: David Hillenbrand; Scott Hillenbrand
- Written by: Patrick Casey; Worm Miller
- Produced by: David Hillenbrand; Scott Hillenbrand; Sanford Hampton
- Starring: Tatyana Ali; Boti Bliss; James DeBello; Marieh Delfino; Tony Denman; Danielle Fishel; Courtney Gains; Edwin Hodge; Jennifer Lyons; Chris Owen; Patrick Renna; Cameron Richardson; Randy Spelling
- Cinematography: Philip D. Schwartz
- Edited by: Dave O'Brien
- Music by: David Hillenbrand
- Distributed by: Showcase Entertainment
- Release date: September 26, 2003
- Running time: 96 minutes
- Country: United States
- Language: English
- Box office: $436,365

National Lampoon Presents Dorm Daze is a 2003 American comedy film directed by David and Scott Hillenbrand and written by Patrick Casey and Worm Miller. The film showcases many new and largely then-unknown actors and actresses, including Tony Denman, Tatyana Ali, Patrick Renna, Chris Owen, Marie-Noelle Marquis, Danielle Fishel, and Cameron Richardson.

== Plot ==
At Billingsley University, students in the McMartin Hall dorm prepare for Christmas break. Styles hires a prostitute named Dominique to take the virginity of his younger brother Booker, who is faithful to his girlfriend Rachel. Meanwhile, Gerri receives an unexpected handbag containing $30,000 and a note from the sender, Lorenzo, implying it is payment for a job. After calling Lorenzo, she realizes he believes she is professional criminal Britney "The Snake". He insists on meeting her to plan a new heist. Wang is expecting a French exchange student—also named Dominique—but asks friends to watch over her until he returns. Pete lets his friend Cliff stay to recover from a breakup. To avoid interacting with the others, Cliff pretends to only speak French.

Adrienne avoids the nerdy Newmar, whom she drunkenly kissed the previous night, as she is secretly in love with Foosball, unaware he is gay. Student Dominique arrives, and Styles, assuming she is the prostitute, tries to force her and Booker together. At the same time, Foosball meets prostitute Dominique and assumes she is the exchange student; she plays along, assuming it is part of his fantasy. She eventually realizes the mistake but continues the act after Marla and Lynn threaten to call the police on student Dominique for prostitution.

Claire overhears Tony practicing a dramatic play with Adrienne and believes they are having an affair. Attempts to confront Adrienne fail because Adrienne is avoiding her after she lost Claire's cherished handbag, which resembles Gerri's cash-filled one. Gerri tells Adrienne about the cash in front of Cliff, believing he cannot understand them. Marla and Lynn then pair Cliff with prostitute Dominique, believing they are both French. Upon learning she is the prostitute, Cliff recruits her to help steal the money. Meanwhile, Claire confronts Adrienne about the supposed affair, while Adrienne believes Claire is talking about the lost handbag.

Later, Adrienne writes a letter confessing her feelings to Foosball, Newmar writes a love letter to Adrienne, and Cliff writes a note to Gerri demanding the handbag. The letters are accidentally switched: Newmar's letter reaches Foosball, who gently rejects him; Cliff's demand letter reaches Adrienne, who believes Claire wrote it; and Adrienne's confession ends up in Tony's room after Gerri writes a number on the back of it for him, convincing Claire of their affair. Adrienne then learns Foosball is gay and misreads Newmar's letter as a coming-out confession.

Gerri entrusts Adrienne with the handbag, but, believing it is hers, Claire steals and gives it to Tony. Prostitute Dominique attempts to steal it from Tony, but it is accidentally thrown down the stairs and taken by Styles when he notices the cash. She seduces Styles, handcuffs him, transfers the cash into her own handbag, and tosses it out the window, only for Wang to find and bring it to Newmar, who believes it is the one for which Adrienne is searching.

Police arrive and arrest Lorenzo, who is a wanted criminal, and prostitute Dominique after student Dominique presents her passport. Claire and Tony reconcile after the misunderstandings are cleared. The restrained Styles, having contemplated his mistakes, confesses to Booker that he is a virgin, only for Booker to reveal he and Rachel have now had sex.

Newmar gives the handbag to Adrienne, and confesses his letter was meant for her. They begin a relationship and decide to keep the money. Wang then receives a call revealing the real student Dominique has arrived after being robbed earlier. Outside, "student Dominique" removes her mask—revealing she is "The Snake"—and begins pursuing Adrienne and Newmar.

== Cast ==
- Tatyana Ali as Claire
- Boti Bliss as Dominique the Hooker
- James DeBello as Cliff Richards
- Marieh Delfino as Gerri Farber
- Tony Denman as Newmar
- Danielle Fishel as Marla
- Courtney Gains as Lorenzo Rozati
- Edwin Hodge as Tony
- Jennifer Lyons as Lynne
- Chris Owen as Booker McFee
- Patrick Renna as Styles McFee
- Cameron Richardson as Adrienne
- Randy Spelling as Foosball
- Gable Carr as Rachel
- Patrick Cavanaugh as Pete
- Gregory Hinton as Ted
- Paul Hansen Kim as Wang
- Marie-Noelle Marquis as Dominique the Student
- Worm Miller as Brady the R.A.
- Katie Lohmann as Dream Girl
- Patrick Casey as Student On Tour

== Production ==
The film was shot on location in California. The three major locations in California used for filming were: Los Angeles, San Diego (including Balboa Park), and Castaic.

== Release ==
=== Box office ===
Dorm Daze opened in a limited release on September 26, 2003, and earned $27,712 in its opening weekend, ranking number 66 in the domestic box office. At the end of its run, closing on October 17, the film had grossed $56,127. Overseas, in Russia, the film fared slightly better, earning $380,238. Worldwide, the film grossed $436,365.

=== Critical reception ===
On Rotten Tomatoes the film holds a 0% rating based on reviews from 7 critics.

Dorm Daze has developed a following of adolescent teenagers in the years since its release. In response, an unrated version was eventually released.

=== Home media ===
The film was released on DVD August 10, 2004 and debuted at number twelve on the DVD rental charts bringing in 2.13 million dollars its first week.

== Sequel ==
A sequel titled National Lampoon's Dorm Daze 2: College @ Sea was released on DVD September 5, 2006. Several of the principal actors returned for the sequel including Tony Denman, Danielle Fishel and Chris Owen.

A second sequel was produced, but was reworked to be a standalone film before being released as Transylmania on December 4, 2009.
