= Special Studies Film II =

- Directed by: Matt Sell
- Written by: Matt Sell
- Produced by: Matt Sell
- Starring: Sean Hall; Worm Miller
- Music by: Sean Hall; Jack Shreck
- Distributed by: Sub Rosa
- Release date: 2003
- Language: English

Special Studies Film II is a 2003 short film starring Sean Hall and Worm Miller that appears before the feature Hey, Stop Stabbing Me!. It was written, directed, and shot by Matt Sell. The film is sometimes referred to by the titles Special Studies I Film II and Killer Doll. The music heard during the film is the theme music to Hey, Stop Stabbing Me! composed by one of the stars Sean Hall, along with fellow actor and musician Jack Shreck.

The film was shot on location in Bloomington, Minnesota near Bush Lake on 16mm color negative film.

== Plot ==
Special Studies Film II is a short film about two men (Hall and Miller) who discover a doll in the woods. The men have been drinking alcohol and start to laugh at the doll. The doll sits up and proceeds to murder the men.
