= Malonga =

Malonga is a surname. Notable people with the surname include:

- Chris Malonga (born 1987), French-born Congolese footballer
- Désirée Malonga (born 1981), Romanian actress and model
- Destin Onka Malonga (born 1988), Congolese footballer
- Dominique Malonga (born 1989), French-born Congolese footballer
- Dominique Malonga (basketball) (born 2005), French basketball player
- Jean Malonga (1907–1985), Republic of the Congo writer and politician
