= Boti (given name) =

Boti is a given name. Notable people with the name include:

- Boti Bliss (born 1975), American actress
- Boti Goa (born 1989), Ivorian footballer
