= Tom Alexander (actor) =

American writer/composer/voice actor

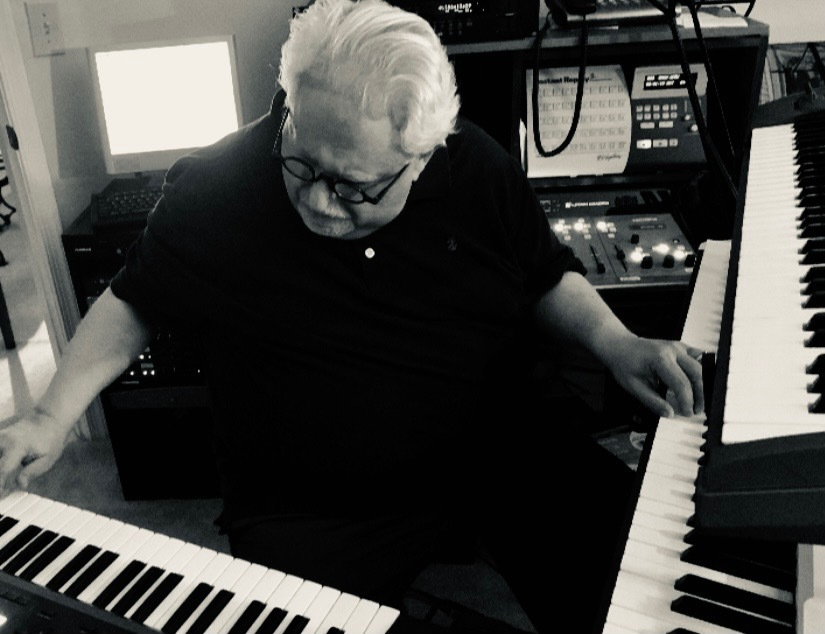

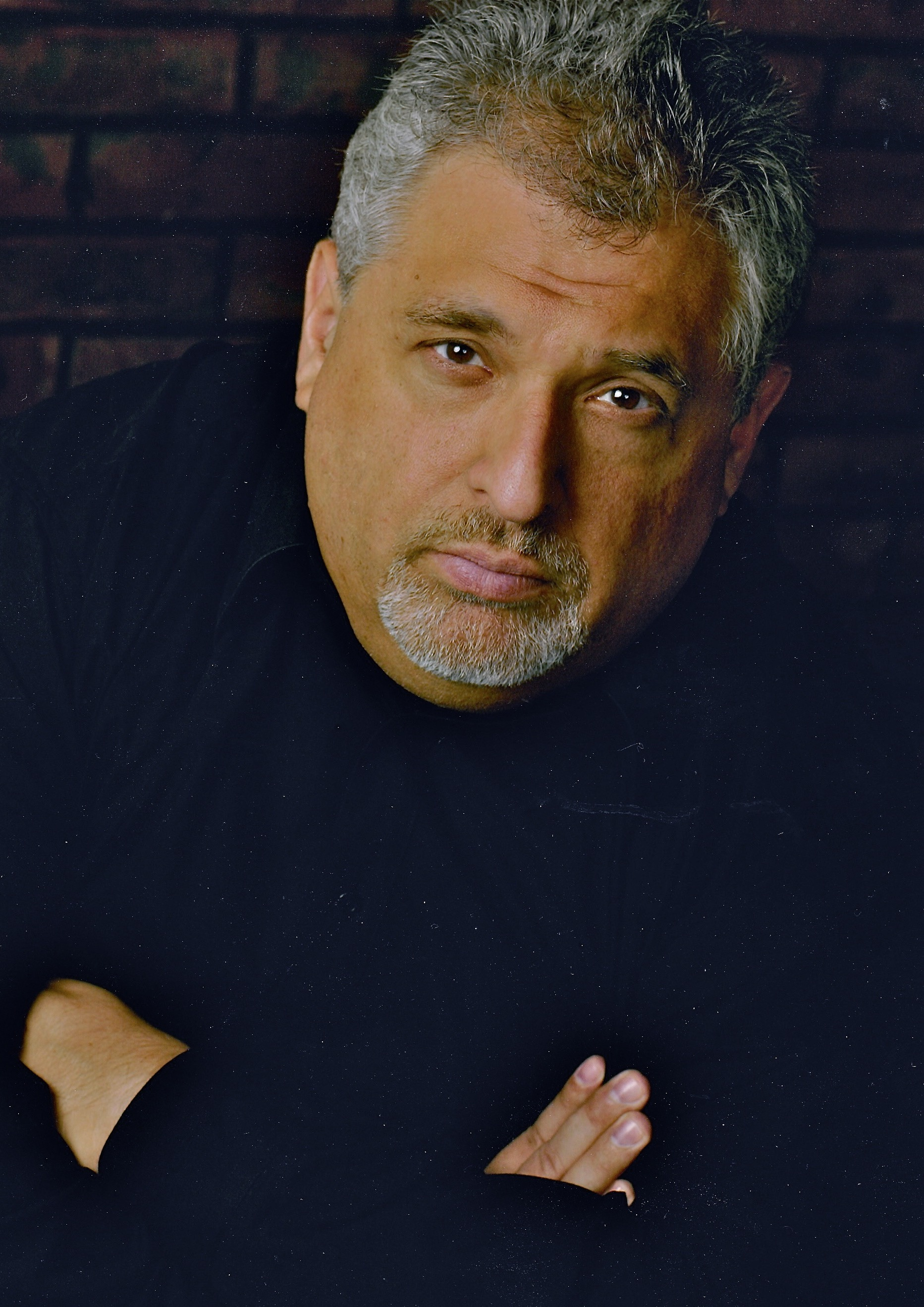
Tom Alexander circa 2012

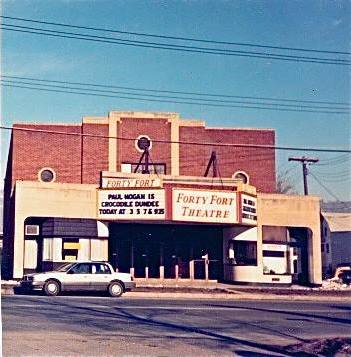
Exterior of the Forty Fort Theatre in 1987

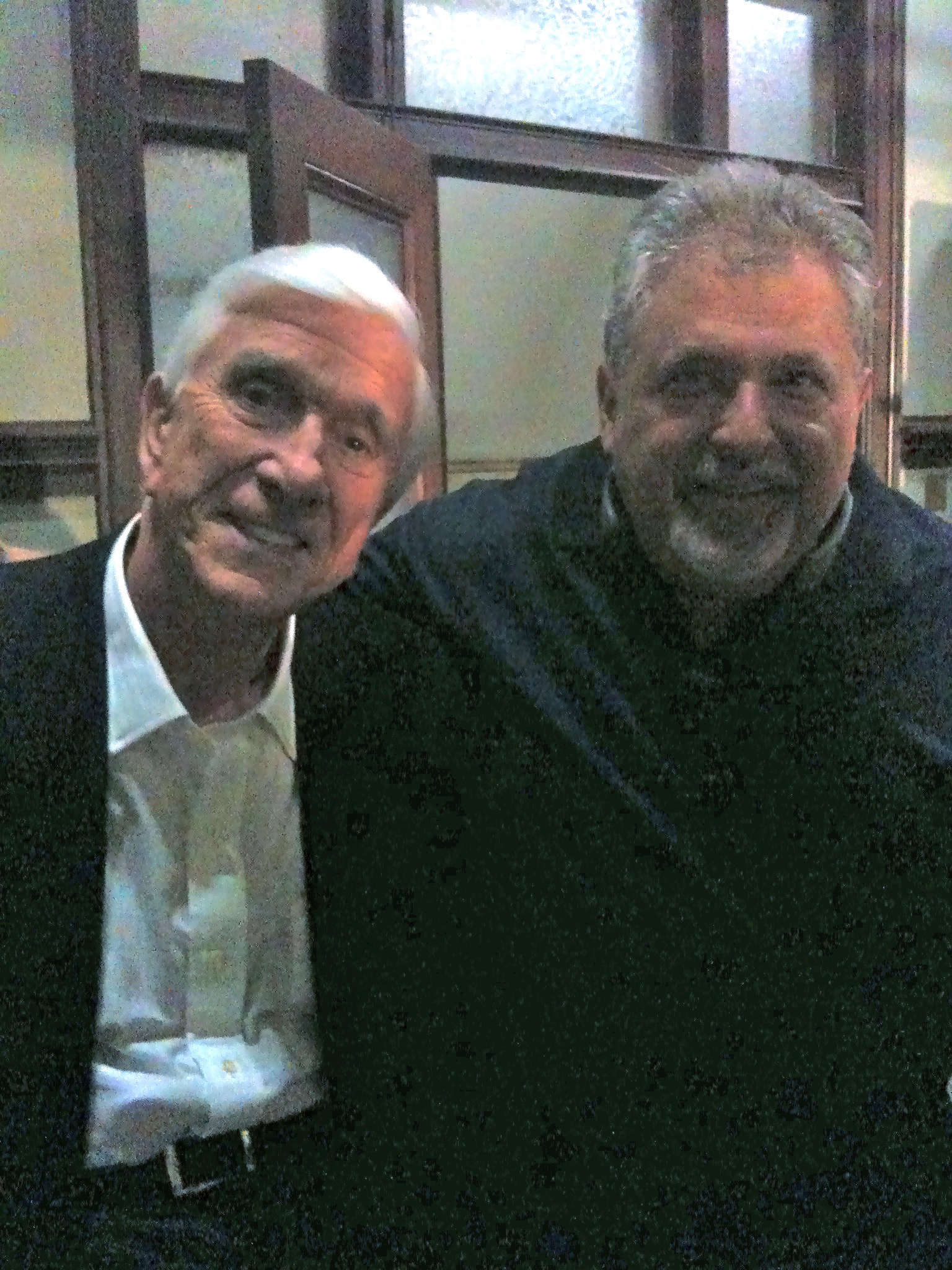
Tom Alexander with actor Leslie Nielsen on the set of Stonerville

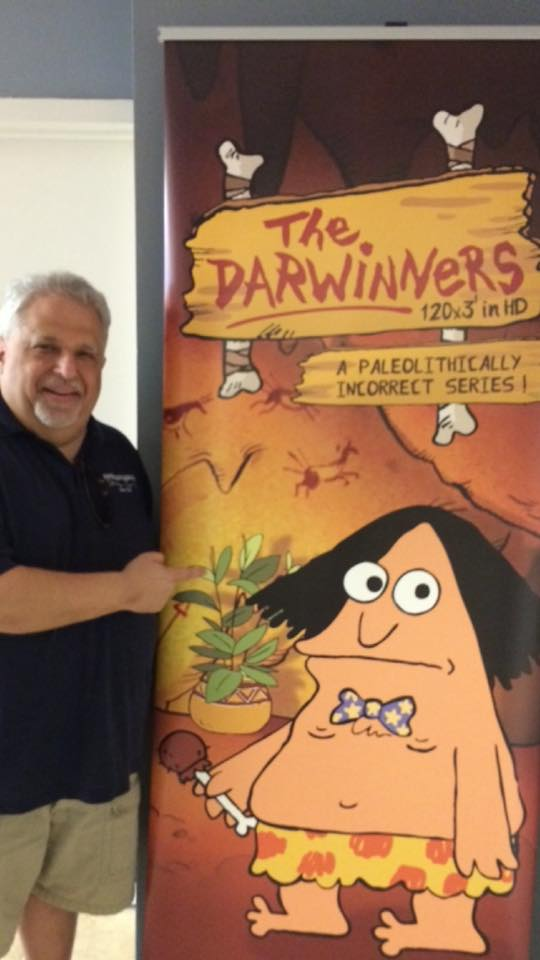
Tom Alexander with the Darwinners production poster in 2015

Thomas Christopher Peter Alexander is a Greek-American writer, broadcaster/podcaster, composer, and voice actor. He is a member of the Screen Actors Guild.

Tom was the Executive Editor and Co-Founder of the sports satire website The Sportsman's Daily, founded in 2006. The site included articles and radio content. It ceased operations in 2017.

== Career ==
Since he was a young boy, Alexander worked as a ticket taker, concession stand worker, projectionist, and assistant manager at his family's movie theatre in Forty Fort, PA. When the theatre closed, he pursued radio as a career. His first full-time radio job was as a nighttime board operator and host of "The Movie Guy," a call-in show about the latest movies, at WARD-AM in Pittston, Pennsylvania beginning in August 1989. During this time he also honed his comedy writing skills on the "Daniels and Webster" radio show at WEZX in Scranton. In 1992 he took a job as copywriter and voiceover artist at WKRZ-FM in Wilkes-Barre.

In November 1996, he accepted a job as Head Writer/Musical Director of “The Drive” with Scott Kaplan and Sid Rosenberg, a nationally syndicated sports-comedy hybrid radio show broadcast from CBS Interactive (then CBS Sportsline) in Fort Lauderdale, Florida. He wrote most of the show's sketches, voiced multiple characters, and wrote and performed the show's song parodies. He remained with the show for three years.

In 1999 he took the position of Creative Director at WAFN Radio in Miami.

In 2002, he formed Alexander Productions, where he focused on script writing for radio, TV, and film as well as voiceover work and musical imaging. In 2004, he co-hosted a baseball radio show called "Diamond Talk" with Marc James on WFLL in Miami. In 2005 and 2006 he was hired as the piano-playing sidekick to a talking beverage bottle in a series of popular TV and radio spots for Mike's Hard Lemonade. The commercials were produced in Miami, Austin, Mexico City, San Francisco, and the Playboy Mansion in Los Angeles.

In 2008, he co-wrote the frat-boy comedy Stonerville, starring Patrick Cavanaugh, Brian Guest, Pauly Shore, Phil Morris, and Leslie Nielsen. The film went into production the following year and was released in January 2011. It was Nielsen's final screen appearance. Alexander appeared in the film as a British sophisticate and as “Robert De Niro’s cousin” Giuseppe.

He has written or co-written several screenplays including Rehab in Vegas, and the sequel to Stonerville.

In September 2012, he revived his Silver Microphone award-winning radio essay series From the Bleachers for Yahoo! Sports Radio.

In 2014, he began voicing the character of Blog, the neurotic head of a caveman family, in the English-language version of the animated comedy series The Darwinners.

He is currently writing a book on his family's 80-year history in the cinema industry, which also touches on his personal memories in the business, called Making Concessions: One Family's Life From the Other Side of the Silver Screen.

In 2019, he began work on the screenplay for a horror project entitled, "Zathina". The project was co-written with his son, Peter, who is set to direct the film in 2025. He also produces and hosts several podcasts with topics ranging from business and entertainment to music and sports.

== Music ==
Alexander was interested in piano at an early age and took lessons beginning at age nine. He found formal music studies tedious and realized he was relying more on his ear. He soon quit formal studies. His father's youngest brother, Taki, a jazz pianist, was an early major influence, but Tom claims he is basically self-taught. After playing in rock and blues bands in high school and college, he discovered jazz, and in particular fusion and art rock. Being influenced especially by the music of Chick Corea, Herbie Hancock, Josef Zawinul, Pat Metheny, and John McLaughlin, Alexander began forming his own fusion groups by the mid 1980s and recorded several original compositions on public radio as well as performing them in live settings through the mid 1990s.

In 1993, he co-founded the fusion groups World Is and Marketplace with drummer and fellow broadcaster Andrew Morrell.

In 1995 he co-wrote the score for the motion picture Philly Flash.

As Musical Director of the nationally syndicated “The Drive” radio show for CBS Interactive (1996–99), he wrote the show's theme song as well as countless song parodies. In 1999, he composed the theme for Football Playbook for Ion (then PAX) Television.

In 2001, he self-produced a solo piano CD called What's Ahead? It was featured prominently during an interview on Weekend Edition Sunday with Liane Hansen on NPR Radio on Father's Day, June 17, of that year. On January 22, 2021, a 20th Anniversary Edition of What's Ahead? was released across multiple digital platforms.

In 2004, he produced the more fusion oriented Flying Against the Time Zones.

In 2005 and 2006, he co-composed and performed much of the music on a series of television and radio ads for Mike's Hard Lemonade. He also wrote incidental music for the film Stonerville (2011).

Though his work is largely instrumental, he has composed several songs with lyrics including "Share Some Strength," "Mark the Time," "Make December Stay," "Sleigh in the Sky" and others, some of which have been performed by other artists including New York-based jazz pianist, John di Martino.

He composes and performs with his fusion group, Earth Code, which he co-founded in the early 2000s with drummer, Tommy G. Lee. The band functions primarily as a trio with keyboards, drums and electric bass. The group has had several bassists over the years including Yngwie Malmsteen's touring bassist, Emilio Martinez. Guitarists often join the group in live performances and on recordings. Earth Code's first album, Tones From the Middle Distance, was released on April 2, 2018. Earth Code's second album, Idiom, was released on February 24, 2023.

Beginning in 2023, he began performing a series of concerts with Grammy-nominated lute virtuoso, Vasilis Kostas. The duo performs as Echoes of Greece and describe the music as a fusion of original Greek traditional music, jazz, world and cinematic.

Quiescence: A Collection of Ballads, is a compilation album of primarily solo piano originals, and was released in November of 2023. Quiescence Vol. 2: A Collection of Ballads was released in February, 2024. His latest solo studio album, Dreams In Blue (Original Soundtrack Studio Recordings from the Films: The Centenarian, Walkin’ the Way & The Last Weekend) released in October 2020. The music was composed entirely to accompany the films of his son, writer/director Peter Alexander. The album features Emilio Martinez on bass and guitar. Martinez also engineered and co-produced the recording with Alexander. Vocalist Kayla Smith appears on several tracks as well as vocalist/guitarist, Lucas Blando.

Overbrook Avenue, primarily made up of original compositions, was released in December 2016. Alexander played piano and keyboards on the recording, and special guest John Fifield is featured on guitar. A solo project, "Cinemusique: A Tribute to 12 Great Film Directors" was released in December 2021.
