= 100 Girls =

2000 comedy film directed by Michael Davis

- Promotional poster
- Directed by: Michael Davis
- Screenplay by: Michael Davis
- Produced by: Ehud Bleiberg; Richard Finney; Yitzhak Ginsberg; Terence Michael
- Starring: Jonathan Tucker; Emmanuelle Chriqui; James DeBello; Katherine Heigl; Larisa Oleynik; Jaime Pressly; Marissa Ribisi
- Cinematography: James Lawrence Spencer
- Edited by: Kevin D. Ross
- Music by: Kevin Bassinson
- Production companies: Dream Entertainment; Michael/Finney Productions
- Distributed by: Lionsgate
- Release dates: September 1, 2000 (Italy); September 25, 2001 (United States)
- Running time: 94 minutes
- Country: United States
- Language: English

100 Girls is a 2000 American romantic sex comedy film written and directed by Michael Davis, and starring Jonathan Tucker, Emmanuelle Chriqui, James DeBello, Katherine Heigl, Larisa Oleynik, Jaime Pressly, and Marissa Ribisi. It tells the story of a college student's efforts to find a mystery girl with whom he had sex in an elevator during a blackout. It was released direct-to-video on September 25, 2001.

== Plot ==
After leaving a party at a women's dormitory, Matthew is trapped in an elevator with an unknown, and unseen, woman when the power goes out. They have sex in the dark and when Matthew wakes up in the elevator the morning after, he finds himself alone with a pair of her panties.

On a mission to find his mystery maiden by looking for a matching bra for the panties, Matthew becomes the maintenance man of the "Virgin Vault", an all-female dormitory. This allows him to investigate without drawing suspicion. His roommate Rod keeps telling him to give up and introduces him to the "penile power", which involves the use of weights attached to his penis as a means of increasing the organ's size. He does this and insults women to make himself feel better about the problem he has with his manhood; he has hypospadias.

Early on, Matthew watches as a woman named Patty and her boyfriend Crick fight. Crick is the epitome of the macho man stereotype, with his big pectorals, conceited attitude, and abusiveness. Matthew tries to save Patty but is hurt by Crick. Crick leaves, and Patty tries to help Matthew, but Matthew cannot help but think of Patty's reputation as a "slut".

While searching one room, Matthew finds himself trapped in the bathroom when the occupant returns. Matthew is attacked by Wendy until she recognizes him as a high school classmate. Wendy decides to help Matthew in his quest to find his mystery maiden, hoping that, in the process, she may find one of her own, as she is a closeted lesbian.

Matthew is nervous about talking to girls. Arlene and his teacher Ms. Stern disparage Matthew, asserting that women are more dominant than men and that women, rather than men, should be in command. Rod tells Matthew that he is a chicken and should just give up on girls, while Matthew tells him that he has never been able to speak to girls, especially Cynthia.

Matthew puts an advertisement in the school newspaper asking the girl he is seeking to meet him in the basement on a Thursday night. He sits in the dark every Thursday night, waiting for her to show up. The door opens one night, and he thinks it is her, but it is Wendy, coming to check up on him. Finally, the mystery maiden does show up, only to tell him to stop looking for her.

Despite this, Matthew is not deterred, and disguises himself in drag, as Francesca, as a means to continue his search. In drag, he can talk to Cynthia without being intimidated by her good looks. She then gets injured after two students accidentally drop a couch on her. Rod flirts with Francesca and later brags to Matthew that he had sex with her. This makes Matthew so angry that he adds another weight onto Rod's "penile power" device, hurting him. Crick makes a pass at Matthew in drag while he fights with Patty. Matthew bites off part of Crick's tongue. As a result, Crick is unable to speak without lisping.

With the end of the semester nearing, desperation sets in, so Matthew appeals to his mystery maiden by proclaiming his love for her to the whole dormitory. He finally determines his mystery maiden is Patty. She initially rejects him because she thought that he would see her only as a slut. Crick sees that Matthew wants Patty, but Matthew has him arrested for sexually assaulting him (when he was dressed as Francesca).

Matthew introduces Rod and Dora and hooks Wendy up with Arlene. Cynthia shows off her newly found martial arts abilities that she discovered as a way to cope with frustration following her injury, and Ms. Stern learns a valuable lesson on gender equality, as Matthew stands up to her in front of the class, to an ovation. Finally, Matthew proclaims his love to Patty, who sees his loving eyes, and they kiss.

== Cast ==
- Jonathan Tucker as Matthew
- Emmanuelle Chriqui as Patty
- James DeBello as Rod, Matt's Roommate
- Katherine Heigl as Arlene
- Larisa Oleynik as Wendy
- Jaime Pressly as Cynthia
- Marissa Ribisi as Dora
- Johnny Green as Crick
- Aimee Graham as Ms. Stern
- Ange Billman as Dana
- Kristina Anapau as Sasha
- Rainbeau Mars as Maureen
- Monica Huarte as Janeite #1
- Reilly McLaren as Janeite #2
- Kristin Herold as Barbara
- Anya Marina as Rhonda
- Josephine Angelini as Michelle
- Julieanne Steger as Penny
- Ivana Bozilovic as Rene
- Eric Szmanda as Sam
- Jennifer Ko as Crystal
- Alex Duda as Ronald

== Reception ==
=== Critical response ===
On the review aggregator website Rotten Tomatoes, 60% of 5 critics' reviews are positive, with an average rating of 5.9/10.

Christopher Null of Reel.com gave it 2.5/4 and described the film as "One hell of an oddity" David Nusair of Reel Film gave the film 2.5/4, and comparing it to films like Scary Movie concluded "...you could certainly do worse."

=== Accolades ===
Award/association	Year	Category	Recipient(s) and nominee(s)	Result	Ref.
Video Premiere Awards	2001	Best Live-Action Video Premiere Movie	100 Girls	Won	
Video Premiere Awards	2001	Best Actress	Emmanuelle Chriqui	Nominated	
Video Premiere Awards	2001	Best Original Score	Kevin Bassinson	Nominated	
Video Premiere Awards	2001	Best Editing	Kevin D. Ross	Won	

== See also ==
- 100 Women (2002), a thematic sequel by the same writer/director. It had a short, limited release in theaters as Girl Fever before being released on DVD and movie channels as 100 Women.
