= Demon Island =

- Directed by: David Hillenbrand and Scott Hillenbrand
- Written by: David Hillenbrand and Scott Hillenbrand
- Produced by: Nicholas Brendon, Reid Burns, Sanford Hampton, David Hillenbrand, Scott Hillenbrand, Albert Miniaci, and Lance Matthew Olsen
- Starring: Nicholas Brendon; Jaime Pressly; Eugene Byrd
- Cinematography: Philip D. Schwartz
- Edited by: Guy W. Cearley
- Music by: David Hillenbrand
- Distributed by: First Look Home Entertainment
- Release date: June 14, 2002
- Running time: 85 minutes
- Language: English

Demon Island, also called Piñata: Survival Island, is a 2002 horror film that stars Nicholas Brendon and Jaime Pressly.

== Plot ==
A small, isolated tribe is cursed by spirits for their sins. One of the tribesmen crafts a clay piñata which the tribe put their evil into, and then sends the object afloat in the ocean.

A group of college students sail to a remote island for an annual Cinco de Mayo treasure hunt. There, every fraternity boy is handcuffed to a random sorority girl. Each couple is instructed to collect as many pairs of strewn underwear on the island as possible. The couple that collects the most underwear and presents them to judges Monica and Paul will receive $20,000. The groups consist of Jake and Julie, Doug and Carmen, Bob and Lisa, Larry and Connie, and Kyle and Tina. As the hunt starts, the pairs eagerly retrieve underwear, apart from Kyle and Tina who have just broken up with each other. Bob and Lisa find the piñata, accidentally bringing the object to life. It proceeds to beat Bob to death with a branch while Lisa runs away.

Kyle and Tina decide to forget about the break-up and join in the game. Lisa warns Larry and Connie of the piñata, but neither of them believe her and continue on their search. They pick up a shovel and get a bunch of underwear from a secret stash. The piñata picks up the shovel and crushes Connie's head before turning on Larry. Lisa goes to the camp and tells Paul and Monica about what she saw. The judges, unsure about whether they should believe her or not, go to look for Bob. While they do so, Jake and Julie see the piñata, and when Jake goes to open it, the piñata grabs him and rips out his testicles while it beats Julie to death. Paul is later killed, as Kyle and Tina reconcile. A new group of Kyle, Tina, Doug, Carmen, and Lisa now leaves when they see Bob ripped in half on a tree. Doug is hanged by the piñata. As Carmen and Lisa go back, Lisa takes a bathroom break right before Carmen gets her head chopped off. Monica finds Kyle and Tina. Lisa makes it to the camp and thinks Larry and Connie are in there just before she is killed by the piñata. Kyle, Tina and Monica kill the piñata by blowing it up by a Molotov cocktail.

== Cast ==
- Nicholas Brendon as Kyle
- Jaime Pressly as Tina
- Eugene Byrd as Doug
- Casey Fallo as Monica
- Lara Wickes as Lisa
- Garrett Wang as Paul
- Julia Mendoza as Carmen
- Daphne Duplaix as Julie
- Nate Richert as Jake
- Aeryk Egan as Larry
- Tressa DiFiglia as Connie
- Robert Tena as Bob
- Ed Gale as Piñata

== Production ==
Originally, the piñata monster was played by an actor in a rubber suit, and the film contained no computer effects. After the final cut, computer effects were added to make the monster more frightening.

== Reception ==
Bruce Eder of Allmovie praised the film's evoking of numerous horror films from past decades, and said, "The plot is clever, turning logic on its head in grisly fashion and twisting around some of the conventions of the modern horror genre." Additionally praising the inventive deaths, "nutty lightheartedness", and set design, he concluded, "Piñata: Survival Island ... is not a great movie, just a better, cleverer movie than one would expect from this genre at this late date and also a great deal of fun." Felix Vasquez of Cinema Crazed regarded it as a guilty pleasure which seems deliberately ridiculous. He commented, "Sure, this is an age old formula, but I’ve never seen it put to such use before. There’s nothing but fun in this film and you can’t help laugh at the horrendous acting by the cast ..." Barbara Kingsolver's 2022 novel Demon Copperhead makes lighthearted reference to the film, in chapter 40, when the protagonist sees it at a drive in.
