= National Lampoon's Dorm Daze 2: College @ Sea =

- Directed by: David Hillenbrand; Scott Hillenbrand
- Written by: Patrick Casey; Worm Miller
- Produced by: David Hillenbrand; Scott Hillenbrand; Sanford Hampton
- Starring: James DeBello; Marieh Delfino; Tony Denman; Larry Drake; Danielle Fishel; Vida Guerra; Jennifer Lyons; Richard Riehle; Chris Owen; Charles Shaughnessy; Justin Whalin
- Cinematography: Philip D. Schwartz
- Edited by: Dave O'Brien
- Music by: David Hillenbrand
- Production companies: Hill & Brand Entertainment; Open Sky Entertainment
- Distributed by: Lionsgate
- Release date: September 5, 2006
- Running time: 100 minutes
- Country: United States
- Language: English

National Lampoon's Dorm Daze 2: College @ Sea is a 2006 American comedy film and the sequel to National Lampoon Presents Dorm Daze (2003). Chris Owen and Danielle Fishel reprised their roles from the original along with Tony Denman, James DeBello, Patrick Cavanaugh, Marieh Delfino, Jennifer Lyons, and Gable Carr. Added to the ensemble are Vida Guerra, Charles Shaughnessy, Richard Riehle, Jasmin St. Claire, Oren Skoog and Justin Whalin. The film was directed by brothers David and Scott Hillenbrand and written by long-time collaborators Patrick Casey and Worm Miller.

The music of UK Swing Band Dominic Halpin and the Honey B's is featured in this film along with a score composed by David Hillenbrand.

== Plot ==
One year after the events of Dorm Daze, the Billingsley University sophomores join a Semester-at-Sea Caribbean cruise, where they will perform a murder-mystery play written by Robin for a competition. Booker breaks up with Rachel to pursue other women, only to discover she has already signed up for the trip. Rusty is determined to lose his virginity, while Marla and Lynn have embraced "born-again virgin" status following court-ordered rehab. Pete, now a struggling stoner after losing his financial aid because of Cliff's actions, competes against the successful Gerri for a student grant. Dante, who is obsessed with Robin, learns she is having an affair with her professor, Rex Cavendish.

Aboard the ship, Cavendish gives a lecture about the Pharaoh's Heart, a $20 million diamond he secretly stole. During a night ashore, Pete and Wang impulsively buy a kleptomaniac monkey, Choo Choo. Back on the ship, Cavendish unwittingly avoids an attempted poisoning by an unseen killer, though Choo Choo steals the vial of poison. When Cavendish tries to flee the ship with the diamond, he and the killer scuffle: Cavendish falls to his death, and the diamond disappears into the lower decks. Rusty and Foosball find Cavendish's body, mistake him for being drunk, and accidentally cause him to be sent overboard.

The following morning, after a drunken hookup with Stukas, Gerri runs into the dean while sneaking back to her room naked, giving Pete the advantage for the grant. Rusty tries to get her drunk again to seduce her, then stumbles blindly into the women's showers after Marla splashes him with alcohol, ultimately ending up dangling naked outside Newmar's window and publicly ruining Newmar's chance to have sex with his devout girlfriend Violet, finally. Embarrassed, Violet quits the play, and Rachel takes her role.

During rehearsals, Rachel and Booker reconcile. Choo Choo uncovers the real diamond and drops it onstage, where it becomes mixed with a chest of prop glass gems. Rusty later realizes that Mrs. Bunkley, the captain's wife, is a former porn actress, and blackmails her for sex, arranging to return during the play. Before the play, Pete spikes Gerri's drink to sabotage her, while Dante, hoping to ruin Robin's work, drugs Stukas with what he believes is a hallucinogen, unaware that Choo Choo has replaced it with the poison.

During the play, Stukas collapses and dies onstage, causing Gerri to drink heavily, though the others assume he is acting. Lynn drops a diamond, which does not break, prompting Pete and Marla to realize it is the Pharaoh's Heart and to chase after it. Rachel and Booker improvise to cover for the missing cast members. Rusty's meeting with Mrs. Bunkley is interrupted by Captain Bunkley, who discovers the room full of naked men. The men flee, chased by the enraged captain.

The play descends into chaos before the naked men run across the stage, followed by the captain, who spots Pete with the diamond. Revealing himself as the killer, the captain explains that he wants the gem for his wife, but he is killed when a loose stage light falls on him. The audience cheers, assuming the events are part of the show.

As the ship returns home, the dean disqualifies Pete and Gerri from the grant for misconduct. Although the troupe wins the competition, he denies Robin the award since the play performed was not her script, while Dante faces potential prosecution for unintentionally killing Stukas. When the diamond drops and shatters, the students realise it is another fake. Rusty joins a queue of men waiting to have sex with Mrs. Bunkley, while Violet takes pity on Newmar and has sex with him. Elsewhere, Choo Choo triumphantly keeps the real diamond.

== Cast ==
- Charles Shaughnessy as Professor Rexford "Rex" Cavendish
- Oren Skoog as Rusty Daugerdaus
- Vida Guerra as Violet
- James DeBello as Cliff Richards
- Marieh Delfino as Gerri Farber
- Patrick Cavanaugh as Peter Michael "Pete" Hanson
- Tony Denman as Newmar
- Nicolas Shake as Dante
- Jeremy Howard as Eli
- Justin Whalin as Foosball
- Chris Owen as Booker McFee
- Danielle Fishel as Marla
- Jennifer Lyons as Lynne
- Worm Miller as Brady
- Paul Hansen Kim as Wang
- Kip Martin as Stukas
- Gable Carr as Rachel
- Richard Riehle as Captain Bunkley
- Jasmin St. Clair as Mrs. Bunkley / Summer Solstice
- Larry Drake as Dean Dryer
- China Jesusita Shavers as Robin Daniels
- Patrick Casey as Mike
- Kinna McInroe as Olga
- Dr. Joyce Brothers as Celebrity judge
- Ted Lange as Celebrity judge
- Kato Kaelin as Celebrity judge
- Travis Van Winkle as Frat guy

== Production ==
The film was shot on location in California, primarily aboard the Queen Mary, docked in the Port of Long Beach.

== Release ==
The film had its premiere screening at the Directors Guild of America Building in Hollywood on June 14, 2006.

== Home media ==
The film was released on DVD September 5, 2006. It debuted at number 28 on the U.S. rental box office charts bringing in $790,000 in its first five days.

== Sequel ==
A third film was planned but was reworked into what became Transylmania, released in 2009.
