= Fortress (2012 film) =

- Release poster
- Directed by: Michael R. Phillips
- Screenplay by: Adam Klein
- Produced by: Julian Moss; Jason McKinley; Brian Thompson; Jerry Buteyn; Adam Klein
- Starring: Bug Hall; Donnie Jeffcoat; Sean McGowan; Joseph Williamson
- Cinematography: Jason Newfield
- Edited by: Paul Kavadias
- Music by: Christopher Ward
- Production companies: Bayou Pictures; Diamondback 99
- Distributed by: Bayou Pictures
- Release date: July 31, 2012
- Running time: 105 minutes
- Country: United States
- Language: English
- Budget: $325,000
- Box office: $10,000,000

Fortress (aka Flying Fortress) is a 2012 American war film directed by Michael R. Phillips and stars Bug Hall, Donnie Jeffcoat, Sean McGowan and Joseph Williamson. (Note: A film with a similar title to the European title is Flying Fortress (1942), a British black-and-white war film released by Warner Bros. Pictures,) The film was released by Bayou Pictures and although initially intended for wider release, was a direct-to-video release on July 31, 2012 made by Monarch Video. Fortress takes its name from the iconic Boeing B-17 Flying Fortress World War II bomber that was the centerpiece of the aerial battle in Europe.

Fortress follows the crew of the B-17 Flying Fortress bomber, named Lucky Lass and its crew as they fly in the campaign against Italy during World War II. The opening title sequence in Fortress provides a background on the Mediterranean Theater of Operations and a plan to strike the Italian capital of Rome on July 19, 1943.

== Plot ==
The B-17F Lucky Lass, part of the United States Army Air Forces (USAAF) 99th Bombardment Group (Heavy) (the "Diamondbacks") from the 12th Air Force is stationed at Navrin, Algeria in 1943. The opening reveals air crews are expected to complete 25 combat missions before rotation home, but the odds of surviving 25 missions are 2 in 10. During a raid on Gerbini, Italy, with her Irish-American crew, the Lucky Lass is heavily damaged and the pilot "Pops" (Jamie Martz), and both waist gunners, Jake (Anthony Ocasio) and Joe (Steve Holm) are killed.

Wally (Donnie Jeffcoat) becomes the Lass' aircraft commander, Co-pilot Michael Schmidt (Bug Hall) reports to Wally, and two new waist gunners, Tom (Jeremy Ray Valdez) and Oliver (Tony Elias), are assigned. The replacements are introduced to the alcohol still that flight engineer Burt (Chris Owen) has jury-rigged, explaining the Army adds ethanol to boost the octane rating of aviation fuel, so they are cooking the fuel to distill out the alcohol. When maintenance chief Sergeant Caparelli (Howard Gibson) reports their aircraft fit to fly, the crew throws a party/wake to celebrate their return to flight status and mourn their losses. Michael appears standoffish, refusing to drink or eat the local cuisine, and Wally takes him aside to advise him to try harder to fit in.

During a "milk run" an already hungover Wally succumbs to ptomaine poisoning. Michael takes over and loses sight of the rest of the squadron in the clouds, going off course over heavy flak defences. Michael returns the crew safely and tells Wally he's going to apply for a transfer. Wally convinces him he can win the crew's confidence, and on the next mission lets Michael take the pilot's seat. Shortly after takeoff, the engines begin losing power and the Lass is forced to abort another milk run to Messina. The crew blames Michael for costing them credit for two easy missions, and when the still is destroyed in a fiery explosion, Michael is branded a jinx. However, the squadron returns heavily shot up and Wally assures Michael that aborting the mission had perhaps saved their lives.

Lucky Lass is grounded and some of crew reassigned for the next mission. Charlie (Manu Intiraymi), Eddie (Joseph Williamson) and Michael are not assigned. Michael feels guilty but the crew feels his presence will encourage Caparelli to fix the plane properly. Caparelli is loath to order his men to work in intense daytime heat and reports to Michael they can't find mechanical problems. Michael dresses Caparelli down and orders him to inspect the Lass again, in particular the oil pumps. Caparelli reluctantly obeys and discovers the oil lines fouled with sand. Eddie also pleads with Michael to intervene with Colonel Shay (John Laughlin) after Charlie was caught stealing liquor from the officers' club by the quartermaster, Monroe (Matt Biedel), to make good a promise to Al (Tim Hade) to celebratie his safe return. At his summary court-martial Michael arrives just as the colonel asks Charlie if there are any mitigating factors. Michael explains the Lass' mechanical problems and claims he ordered Charlie to get alcohol to use as a solvent to clean the oil lines. He accepts blame for not being explicit enough in his order to Charlie. The charges are dismissed, the colonel dresses him down and tells Monroe not to waste his time with non-operational matters. The colonel asks Charlie why he only grabbed Scotch whiskey, to be told the Lass is an Irish bomber with discriminating taste. The crew celebrates Charlie's exoneration and declare Michael an honorary Irishman, christening him, "O'Schmidt".

The Lass flies again on a mission to Rome. Burt is blinded by shrapnel on the bomb run but manage to release their bombs over the target. Making a turn for home, a B-17 flying above them is hit and despite evasive action, the doomed bomber's wing clips the Lass' right horizontal stabilizer, causing them to go into an uncontrolled climb until they stall and then spin. The plane loses altitude rapidly as Michael and Wally struggle to regain control. They pull up very low over Rome under heavy ground fire and Wally is killed by flak that destroys one of their engines. Tom is killed when he checks on a wounded Oliver in the waist. Michael asks Archie (Sean McGowan) to come to the cockpit to help him fly, since the navigator was once in flight school. The Lucky Lass makes a run for a British airbase at Malta.

Michael asks Al in the ball turret about their situation and is told despite the knocked-out engines and other damage, the B-17 is flying well. The damaged port landing gear falls away as it's being lowered, and Michael orders everyone to bail out, not realizing Archie is wounded. He leaves the cockpit with Archie at the controls to help the crew bail out. Archie opens the bomb bay doors and makes his way back to Michael as the last of the crew exits the plane. Michael is horrified to see Archie covered in blood and in excruciating pain and noticies Archie's parachute has been destroyed. Michael says they can land the aircraft on the water or both jump together using his parachute. Archie nods, but he then tells Michael to "take care of the boys" and pushes Michael out. Archie takes control of the B-17 and climbs until the airplane disintegrates.

At Narvin, a new replacement checks in with Michael, now the flight commander of a new bomber.

== Cast ==
- Bug Hall as 2nd Lt Michael Schmidt, (co-pilot), (pilot/aircraft commander)
- Donnie Jeffcoat as 1st Lt Wally McAllister, (co-pilot), later, (pilot/aircraft commander)
- Sean McGowan as 2nd Lt Archie Mason, (navigator)
- Chris Owen as Burt, (top turret gunner/flight engineer)
- Edward Finlay as 2nd Lt F. "Philly" Phelps, (bombardier)
- Manu Intiraymi as Sgt Charlie O'Hara, (radio operator)
- John Laughlin as Col Shay, base commander
- Howard Gibson as Sgt "Cap" Caparelli, crew chief
- Joseph Williamson as Eddie, (tail gunner)
- Tony Elias as Sgt Oliver Giscard, (waist gunner)
- Tim Hade as Al, (ventral ball turret gunner)
- Jeremy Ray Valdez as Sgt Tom Martinez, (waist gunner)
- Jamie Martz as 1st Lt L. "Pops" O'Connor, (pilot/aircraft commander)
- Mark Doerr as briefing officer
- Matt Biedel as 1st Lt Monroe, quartermaster
- Anthony Ocasio as Jake, (waist gunner)
- Steve Holm as Joe, (waist gunner)
- Bobby Naderi as Ziri
- Drew Van Acker as 2nd Lt Bob Tremaine, (co-pilot)

== Production ==
In the closing credits, Fortress filmmakers make the sardonic declaration, "No B-17s were hurt in the making of this film." The statement was accurate as the low budget feature could not afford to use actual surviving B-17s, either in private collections or in museums. With principal photography undertaken in 2011, Radical 3D was responsible for the authentic computer-generated imagery (CGI) film effects. The company's involvement with Lucasfilm, Fox Television, IMAX, Warner Brothers and Disney was in feature work, including the similar productions, George Lucas’s Red Tails (2012) and the Tom Hanks production of Beyond All Boundaries (2009) (for which effects have been nominated for a VES award).

Radical 3D was also involved in television projects for Discovery Channel, History Channel and National Geographic Channel including 24 and Dogfights (premiered in 2006), the highest rated series on the History Channel during its first season.

For Fortress, a full-scale interior mock-up was made, recreating the fuselage from tail to cockpit. The principal exterior visual effects began with a CGI rendition that had a unique origin. The producers acquired a 1:28 scale Guillow’s B-17 Balsa wood "flying" model and scaled it up, producing, in effect, a 1:1 B-17 scale model. The upper fuselage, above the “side keels” was placed on a wooden ladder frame, which rested, in turn, on scrap tires. Manipulating the setup, the fuselage was jostled to simulate turbulence and make the actors react to the motion of the aircraft.

Location photography for the Algerian scenes in Fortress took place at Rocking Horse Ranch, Ramona, California in 2011. Other studio work was completed at Radical 3D facilities in Culver City, California.

=== Historical context ===
Fortress depicted accurately the bombing of Rome in World War II in 1943, primarily by Allied aircraft, before the city was freed by the Allies on June 4, 1944. Pope Pius XII was initially unsuccessful in attempting to have Rome declared an open city, although negotiations took place with President Roosevelt via Cardinal Francis Spellman. (Note: Rome was eventually declared an open city on August 14, 1943 (a day after the last Allied bombing) by the defending forces.)

The first Allied bombardment occurred on July 19, 1943 and was carried out by 500 American bombers (a mix of B-17 and B-24 bombers). A total of 1,168 tons of bombs resulted in the entire working class district of San Lorenzo being destroyed with 3,000 Italian civilians killed in the raids over five residential/railway districts. The military targets were few, the largest Stazione Termini contained a marshalling yard, railways and industries that manufactured steel, textile products and glass. In the 110,000 sorties that comprised the Allied Rome air campaign, 600 aircraft were lost and 3,600 air crew members died; 60,000 tons of bombs were dropped in the 78 days before Rome was captured.

The producers gave "very special thanks" to the Planes of Fame Air Museum, Chino, California and also credited 21 technical advisors including staff at the Yanks Air Museum, also in Chino.

== Reception ==
Due to its direct-to-video release, Fortress was not critically reviewed, however, Danny Shamon reviewed the video in 2011, identifying the film elements that were effective, "For a low budget film I thought the aerial combat and filming were fantastic. I liked the sets, and it is obvious that some time was taken on the outfits, and items used during this time period.". Reviewer Ray Nyland noted: " 'Fortress is a low budget film that delivers. The air action sequences are loud, frenetic and exciting with some genuine heart in mouth moments. The camera shakes as the B-17 ploughs through heavy flak, and German fighters flash and spin past, all the time accompanied by explosions and machinegun fire that resonates around the speakers. Most of the model and CGI work of the air battles are neatly done, and believable ..."

== See also ==
- Strategic bombing during World War II
