= List of films with a 0% rating on Rotten Tomatoes =

A list of 0% rated films from the Rotten Tomatoes website

Rotten Tomatoes logo

On the film review aggregation website Rotten Tomatoes, films that every surveyed critic considered poor have a 0% rating. As of November 2026, only 46 films with either a critic's consensus or at least 20 reviews have received this rating.

The Ringer, analyzing films' Rotten Tomatoes scores compared to change in profit margin, estimated that a film with a 0% rating "would be expected to lose about $25 million relative to its budget".

As with films with a 100% rating on Rotten Tomatoes being vulnerable to losing that status if it receives at least one negative review, a film with a 0% rating can have its rating raised when it receives at least one positive review. The poorly-received 2017 animated film The Emoji Movie initially had a 0% rating with at least 28 reviews, but later received a review from Common Sense Media that Rotten Tomatoes deemed positive, raising its rating to 3%. As of November 2026, The Emoji Movie has a 6% rating with 123 negative reviews and eight positive reviews.

== List ==
Year	Film	No. of reviews	Ref
1984	Bolero	23	
1987	Police Academy 4: Citizens on Patrol	19	
1989	Wired	25	
1991	Highlander II: The Quickening	22	
1991	Return to the Blue Lagoon	30	
1992	Folks!	19	
1993	Look Who's Talking Now!	23	
1994	Wagons East!	27	
1994	Highlander III: The Sorcerer	17	
1999	Simon Sez	19	
2000	3 Strikes	28	
2002	Ballistic: Ecks vs. Sever	116	
2002	Killing Me Softly	17	
2002	Merci Docteur Rey	20	
2002	Pinocchio	53	
2002	Derailed	5	
2003	National Lampoon's Gold Diggers	40	
2004	Superbabies: Baby Geniuses 2	46	
2005	Constellation	19	
2005	King's Ransom	43	
2007	Redline	26	
2007	Scar	12	
2008	One Missed Call	78	
2009	Homecoming	23	
2009	Stolen	21	
2009	Transylmania	19	
2010	The Nutcracker in 3D	32	
2011	Beneath the Darkness	21	
2012	Dark Tide	19	
2012	A Thousand Words	57	
2014	Left Behind	69	
2015	The Ridiculous 6	36	
2016	Cabin Fever	30	
2016	Dark Crimes	36	
2016	The Disappointments Room	27	
2016	Max Steel	21	
2016	Precious Cargo	22	
2017	Stratton	35	
2018	Gotti	56	
2018	London Fields	35	
2019	The Queen's Corgi	20	
2020	John Henry	20	
2020	The Last Days of American Crime	41	
2020	Hard Kill	20	
2024	Armor	24	
2025	Alarum	22	

== See also ==
- Lists of films considered the worst
