= Ted Bundy (film) =

2002 American serial killer film directed by Matthew Bright

- Film poster
- Directed by: Matthew Bright
- Written by: Matthew Bright; Stephen Johnston
- Based on: Ted Bundy
- Produced by: Hamish McAlpine; Michael Muscal
- Starring: Michael Reilly Burke; Boti Bliss
- Cinematography: Sonja Rom
- Edited by: Paul Heiman
- Music by: Kennard Ramsey
- Production companies: First Look Media; Tartan Films; Two Left Shoes Films
- Distributed by: First Look Media; Tartan Films; Overseas Film Group (International)
- Release dates: July 26, 2002 (München Fantasy Filmfest); September 13, 2002 (United States)
- Running time: 99 minutes
- Countries: United States; United Kingdom
- Language: English
- Box office: $68,716

Ted Bundy is a 2002 independent biographical crime-thriller film that was written and directed by Matthew Bright, and co-written by Stephen Johnston. The film, which had a limited theatrical release, is a sardonic dramatization of the sexual homicides of Ted Bundy, an American serial killer and necrophiliac who murdered and raped dozens of women and girls in the United States during the 1970s. It stars Michael Reilly Burke as Bundy and Boti Bliss as Bundy's girlfriend, Lee.

== Plot ==
In 1974, Theodore "Ted" Robert Bundy is a student at the Seattle University School of Law who has a long-term girlfriend, Lee, and works part-time at a crisis center nearing campus. Oblivious to his family and friends, however, Ted is a sadistic sociopath who engages in stalking, voyeurism, and petty theft. Ted builds up the courage to commit his first lust murder, killing one of his hotline callers and violating her corpse. He then habitually breaks into the homes of his young, female victims, or lures them to his car by faking disabilities or by impersonating a police officer. Ted then incapacitates and abducts his victims, drives them to a strategic location where escape is impossible, and rapes and murders them. Ted eludes the authorities because he has extensive knowledge of law enforcement and legal tactics from school, including his ability to avoid fitting offender profiles. Law enforcement authorities, however, have Ted's facial composites and have learned his nickname from witnesses.

In 1975, at Murray, Utah, Ted catches 18-year-old Tina Gabler, however, she escapes from his moving car and is rescued by another driver. Two months later, based on Tina's description of his car, a Utah Highway Patrol officer stops and arrests Ted. In Ted's trunk, the state police find his rape kit. Tina testifies against Ted at his trial, where he is convicted of kidnapping. Authorities are alerted about Ted; they investigate his further and soon determine he is the serial killer they are looking for. Ted tells Lee charges are being brought against him for multiple murders, but says investigators lack hard evidence and that he will never be convicted. At this point, Lee realizes Ted is guilty and ends their relationship.

In 1977, Ted represents himself at his trial and is granted access to the Pitkin County Courthouse's law library. He promptly escapes by jumping from an upper-story window. Six days later, after attempting auto theft at Aspen Mountain, Ted is arrested and returned to prison. Months later, Ted again escapes and becomes one of the FBI Ten Most Wanted Fugitives. The following year, Ted settles in Tallahassee, Florida, and continues his murder spree. He assaults four women in Florida State University's Chi Omega sorority house and kills two of them. Over a month later, Ted rapes and murders 12-year-old Suzanne Bruster. Ted is arrested soon afterward and beaten by a Pensacola police officer.

Ted is tried at Dade County Circuit Court and is sentenced to death in the electric chair at Florida State Prison. Over the next 10 years, Ted makes several appeals that hinder his death penalty from being processed and to have his sentence commuted, but loses every single one. On the day of his execution in 1989, prison guards abuse and drag the reviled Bundy from his cell into the death chamber. He is executed in front of his victims' families; the executioner is revealed to be a young woman. As Lee watches news coverage of the execution with her husband, she wonders: "Who was Ted Bundy"?

== Cast ==
- Michael Reilly Burke as Ted Bundy
- Boti Bliss as Lee (based on Elizabeth Kloepfer)
- Julianna McCarthy as Professor
- Jennifer Tisdale as Pretty Girl
- Steffani Brass as Julie
- Tricia Dickson as Barbara Vincennes
- Meadow Sisto as Suzanne Welch
- Eric Da Re as Male Partygoer
- Deborah Offner as Beverly (based on Ann Rule)
- Zarah Little as Patricia Garber
- Alison West as Shawn Randall
- Matt Hoffman as Arnie
- Renee Intlekofer as Miriam Cutler
- Diana Kauffman as Wendy Fitz
- Tiffany Shepis as Tina Gabler (based on Carol DaRonch and Rhonda Stapley)
- Katrina Miller as Gilcrest (based on Nancy Wilcox and Debra Kent)
- Rachael Rowan Hastings as Terry Bell (based on Caryn Eileen Campbell)
- Tom Savini as Salt Lake City Detective
- Gary H. Walton as Randy
- Marina Black as Kate
- Alexa Jago as Betty (based on Carole Ann Boone)
- Carol Mansell as Mrs. Myers
- Rachael MacKenna as Vicky Cassidy
- Bridget Butler as Lara Davidson
- Holly Towne as Lopez
- Phoebe Dollar as Richardson
- Natasha Goodman as Moore
- J-ray Lieberman as Suzanne Bruster (based on Kimberly Leach)
- David Schroeder as Florida Prison Warden
- Joe McDougall as Florida Guard Joe
- Wayne Morse as Florida Guard Bob
- Steve Whelan as Florida Guard Wesley
- Danielle Parris as Florida Executioner
- Jesse Rutherford as I'm Ted Kid
- Alexa Nikolas as I'm Ted Kid
- Tracey Walter as Randy Myers

== Release ==
Ted Bundy had a limited theatrical release in US cities including New York City and Los Angeles in September 2002. In America, it grossed $1,710 on its opening weekend and $6,073 in total, and internationally it grossed $62,643 for a total of $68,716.

=== Home media ===
On October 1, 2002, Overseas Filmgroup/First Look Media releasedTed Bundy on DVD in the US, and Tartan Video released it in the UK in November 2003 under the title Bundy. The film was released on Blu-ray for the first time by the home-video company Vinegar Syndrome on January 31, 2023.

== Reception ==
On the review aggregator website Rotten Tomatoes, Ted Bundy holds an approval rating of 41% based on twenty-two reviews, with an average rating of 5/10. The website's critical consensus reads: "Ted Bundy wastes an impressive performance from Michael Reilly Burke on an exploitative film devoid of any social context or depth". Metacritic assigned the film a weighted average score of 37 out of 100, based on eleven critics, indicating "generally unfavorable" reviews.

Chauncey Gardner of Ain't It Cool News was critical of the film's "really offensive" final scene but otherwise praised it, writing: "It's the movie American Psycho wanted to be, a balls out, no punches pulled examination of a sick and twisted soul". Maitland McDonagh of TV Guide gave the film a score of 3/5, said Matthew Bright does not glamorize or fetishize Bundy or his crimes, and praised Burke's acting, calling it "dead on" and a performance that "evokes "the subtle wrongness beneath the facade that gripped the public imagination". Derek Elley of Variety also praised the "pulpy" and humorously macabre film, deeming it a "quality low-budgeter" that feels like a "disturbingly stygian comedy-drama" with a "sine qua non performance" by Burke.

The Christian Science Monitor gave Ted Bundy a score of 2/4, calling it a "melodrama" and writing: "It's grisly going, but no more exploitative than a lot of mainstream TV reporting about violent crime". Marrit Ingman of The Austin Chronicle gave Ted Bundy a score of 1/5, having found its disquieting atmosphere and commentary on 1970s society are undermined by its "muddled" nature, concluding the film "is never really sure what to say about its subject". Similarly, Neil Smith of the BBC lambasted the film, giving it a score of 2/5and calling an "orgy of gratuitous violence" in which "[w]e learn next to nothing about what made Bundy tick, and leave no closer to understanding how such aberrations occur".

Peter Bradshaw of The Guardian found the film to be plodding and "drearily pointless", and wrote: "This picture is arguably more honest than sexy star vehicles like Red Dragon. That doesn't stop it from being unrewarding, unpleasant and very, very boring." David Chute of LA Weekly was critical of the film's tone, stating: "It's possible that something hip and transgressive was being attempted here that stubbornly refused to gel, but the result is more puzzling than unsettling". Mike D'Angelo of Time Out was largely dismissive of the film, saying there is "too much exploitation and too little art", and that: "The sight of ordinary-looking people committing unspeakably vicious acts no longer carries an inherent charge, and Ted Bundy offers little else".

Jack Mathews of the New York Daily News called Ted Bundy "revolting exploitation" and stated: "If the goal of this biographical horror film about one of America's sickest serial killers was to be as loathsome as its subject, mission accomplished". Megan Turner of New York Post deemed the film a "trashy, exploitative, thoroughly unpleasant experience" that is "tone-deaf" and "more than a little misogynistic". In a review written for The Village Voice, Michael Atkinson said the film "never digs very deep" and concluded: "In the end, Ted Bundy' only justification is the director's common but unexplored fascination with the frustrated maniac; there's no larger point, and little social context. Badlands this ain't."

Michael Reilly Burke and Boti Bliss were nominated for Best Actor and Best Supporting Actress, respectively, at the 2003 Fangoria Chainsaw Awards.

== See also ==
- The Deliberate Stranger, a 1980 book about Ted Bundy, later adapted into a TV-movie starring Mark Harmon as Bundy
- Bundy: An American Icon, a 2009 film about Ted Bundy
- Extremely Wicked, Shockingly Evil and Vile, a 2019 film about Ted Bundy
- No Man of God, a 2021 film about Ted Bundy
- Ted Bundy: American Boogeyman, a 2021 film about Ted Bundy
