= Alexandra Cheron =

American actress and model

- Born: Alexandra Beauvoir Cheron Tavárez; January 16, 1983; San Francisco de Macorís, Dominican Republic
- Died: May 21, 2011 (aged 28); Santo Domingo, Dominican Republic
- Occupation: Actress/model
- Years active: 2005–2011

Alexandra Beauvoir Cheron Tavárez (January 16, 1983 – May 21, 2011) was a Dominican-American actress, model, businesswoman, and socialite.

Tavárez was born in the Dominican Republic. Her father was an accountant from Haiti and her mother an ambassador in the United States for the Dominican Republic. Alexandra grew up in Haiti until 1999, when she moved to Florida.

== Selected filmography ==
- Miami Vice as Nurse (2006)
- After Sex as Jennifer (2007)
- Redline as Model (2007)
- A Raisin in the Sun as Anna (2008)
- This Is Not A Test as Woman at the Counter (2008)
- The Game as Rebecca (2 episodes, 2007–2008)
- Fast & Furious as Sylvia (2009)
- Mama, I Want to Sing! as Kimberly (2011)
