= Stonerville =

- DVD cover
- Directed by: Bill Corcoran
- Written by: Tom Alexander; Kevin Sepe
- Produced by: Kevin Sepe
- Starring: Patrick Cavanaugh; Brian Guest; Pauly Shore
- Edited by: John Coniglio
- Production company: BD Garden
- Distributed by: Screen Media Films
- Release date: January 11, 2011
- Running time: 88 minutes
- Country: United States
- Language: English
- Budget: $400,000

Stonerville is a 2011 American stoner comedy film. Leslie Nielsen played a character simply named Producer, which was his final role before he died. The film was directed by Bill Corcoran. It was written by Kevin Sepe and Tom Alexander.

== Plot ==
Troy "Slam" Slamsky is a viral video guru who is a huge hit on Mespacetube.com. His nagging girlfriend Miranda wants him to take his skills and growing fan base into the real world and get a job in advertising. She is tired of living in their less than modest apartment, and sees Slam's talent as the ticket out. Slam is only interested in making his short movies, getting stoned with his best friend Harlan "Harley" Lovecraft, and someday visiting Cleveland. After a series of disagreements and the discovery that Miranda is two-timing Slam with rich snob Tyler, Slam is suddenly on his own.

He soon encounters the gorgeous Erica. She is a huge fan of Slam and his work. It isn't long before the two are an item. She connects him with her uncle, Johnny Scarano, a gentleman's club owner with mob ties. Slam and Harley go on a full-fledged commercial shooting spree hyping Scarano's club. Slam is suddenly in the money and very much in love with Erica. Slam's produced videos, as well as the ones playing in his mind, are revealed in comedy sketches that are interjected throughout the film.

== Cast ==
- Patrick Cavanaugh as Troy "Slam" Slamsky
- Joey Diaz as Johnny Scarano
- Cameron Goodman as Miranda
- Brian Guest as Harlan "Harley" Lovecraft
- Alex Mauriello as Erica
- Phil Morris as Clay Redding
- Leslie Nielsen as Producer
- Bob Rumnock as Peter Downing, British Man #2
- Pauly Shore as Rod Hardbone
- Preston Vanderslice as Tyler
