= James DeBello =

American actor (born 1980)

- Born: June 9, 1980 (age 45); Hartford, Connecticut
- Occupation: Actor
- Years active: 1997–present

James DeBello (born June 9, 1980) is an American actor. After making his film debut in American Pie (1999), he gained recognition for his starring role in the teen comedy film Detroit Rock City (1999).

In the 2000s, DeBello had starring roles in the films Crime + Punishment in Suburbia (2000), 100 Girls (2000), Cabin Fever (2002), National Lampoon Presents Dorm Daze (2003), National Lampoon's Dorm Daze 2 (2006), and Transylmania (2009). He had supporting roles in the films Swimfan (2002) and After Sex (2007). In the 2010s, DeBello starred in the film The Penthouse (2010) and had a supporting role in the film The FP (2011).

== Early life ==
DeBello was born in Hartford, Connecticut on June 9, 1980. At the age of 16, he moved to Los Angeles and began acting after being discovered by an agent.

== Career ==
DeBello's first credit was a guest role on the medical drama ER in 1997. He had a minor role in the 1999 comedy film American Pie, in which he played a character named "enthusiastic guy." He then appeared in the teen comedy film Detroit Rock City alongside Edward Furlong. In 2002, DeBello played the character Christopher in the psychological thriller film Swimfan. Later that year, he played the character Bert in Eli Roth's directorial debut Cabin Fever. At the casting audition, DeBello refused to stand up when asked by Roth. Roth stated that "just the look he gave me and the way he rolled his eyes told me he was the right guy for the part of Bert." He played Cliff Richards in the comedy film National Lampoon Presents Dorm Daze, and in 2006 reprised the role in Dorm Daze 2.

In 2004, DeBello was arrested after a drunken brawl at a nightclub for allegedly hitting a woman with a plaster cast on his right hand. He was released on suspicion of misdemeanor battery. In 2017, it was reported that DeBello was an AirBNB host for one of Paul Manafort's New York City Apartments shortly after the latter's indictment.

== Filmography ==
=== Film ===
Year	Title	Role	Notes
1999	American Pie	Enthusiastic Guy	
1999	Detroit Rock City	Trip	
1999	Here Lies Lonely	Kenny	
2000	Crime + Punishment in Suburbia	Jimmy	
2000	100 Girls	Rod	
2001	Scary Movie 2	Tommy	
2001	Going Greek	Angry Pledgee	Uncredited
2002	Swimfan	Christopher Dante	
2002	Cabin Fever	Bert	
2002	Nightstalker	Police Officer	Uncredited
2003	Dorm Daze	Cliff Richards	
2003	Red Zone	The Rocker	
2004	Cabin Fever: Family Friendly Version	Bert	Short
2004	Walk Into a Bar	Lead	Short
2004	The Hillz	Craig	
2005	Adam and Eve	Coffee Shop Employee	Uncredited
2006	Steel City	Maria's Brother	
2006	Dorm Daze 2	Cliff Richards	
2006	Rocker	Jackson	
2007	After Sex	Bob	
2007	The FP	Beat Box Busta Bill	Short
2007	Kush	Animal	
2009	Transylmania	Cliff	
2009	No Time to Fear	Jake	
2009	Henry John and the Little Bug	Joseph	Short
2010	The Penthouse	Heath	
2010	10 Years Later	Garrett Hoss	
2011	The FP	Beat Box Busta Bill	
2011	Shooting for Something Else	Ray	Short
2011	Cornered	David	
2012	Random Acts of Violence	Carl	
2013	The Chronicles of Elijah Sincere	Ed Noble	Short
2013	Matanza	Derek	Short
2016	Urge	Gambler	
2017	Sex Guaranteed	Steve	
2019	First Person: A Film About Love	Richard	
2019	Clinton Road	Begory	
2019	Masked Mutilator	Young Steve Carson	
2021	Projections	Rocco	Short
2024	60 Minutes to Kill	David Lynch	Upcoming

=== Television ===
Year	Title	Role	Notes
1997	ER	Danny Seeff	Episode: Ground Zero
1996-1998	Sports Theater with Shaquille O'Neil	Ryan Hull	2 Episodes
1999	The '60s	O'Doud	(Miniseries) 2 Episodes
2002	My Guide to Becoming a Rock Star	Danny Whittaker	Episode: Pilot
2006	American Dad!	A.J.	Episode: With Friends like Steve's
2008	Ghouls	Thomas	Television Movie
