= Tony Denman =

American actor

- Born: October 22, 1979 (age 46); Minneapolis, Minnesota
- Occupation: Actor
- Years active: 1994–present
- Spouse: Sarah-Jane Potts (m. 2002; div. 2009)

Anthony Richard Denman (born October 22, 1979) is an American actor. His first role was in the film Little Big League.

His breakthrough part was in the film Fargo, which he says he is still recognized for. After appearing in Fargo, he starred in various National Lampoon films and had small roles on various television series.

He currently lives in Minnesota.

== Filmography ==
=== Film ===
Year	Title	Role	Notes
1994	Little Big League	Phil	
1995	Angus	Kid	
1996	Fargo	Scotty Lundegaard	
1999	Go	Track Suit Guy	
2000	Blast	Corn	
2000	Poor White Trash	Michael Bronco	
2002	Sorority Boys	Jimmy	
2002	Dead Above Ground	Bobby 'Monster' Mooley	
2003	National Lampoon's Barely Legal	Fred	
2003	National Lampoon Presents Dorm Daze	Newmar	
2006	National Lampoon's Dorm Daze 2	Newmar	
2006	Caffeine	Customer #2	
2009	Transylmania	Newmar	
2018	Madhouse Mecca	Jarrod	
2020	For The Love of Jessee	Sean Frazier	
2023	Abroad	Denny	

=== Television ===
Year	Title	Role	Notes
1997	7th Heaven	Guy	Episode: "See You in September"
1999	Angel	Rieff	Episode: "Hero"
1999–2000	Good vs Evil	Ben Smythe	10 episodes
2000	Seven Days	Young Frank Parker	Episode: "Buried Alive"
2001	Touched by an Angel	Ryan Dempsey	Episode: "I Am An Angel"
2001	Wolf Girl	Cory	Television film
2002	Judging Amy	Tim Laurence	Episode: "Thursday's Child"
2003, 2004	King of the Hill	Jeremy / Sterno / Benji	2 episodes
2012	Naughty or Nice	The Cashier	Television film
2013	Nixon's The One	Steve Bull	2 episodes
2015	My Crazy Ex	Louie	Episode: "Look Who's Stalking"
2017	Casual	Smoking Guy	Episode: "Things to Do In Burbank When You're Dead"
2018	The 33rd: Sci-Fi Anthology	Marvin	Episode: "Fear Itself"
