= Patrick Cavanaugh =

American actor

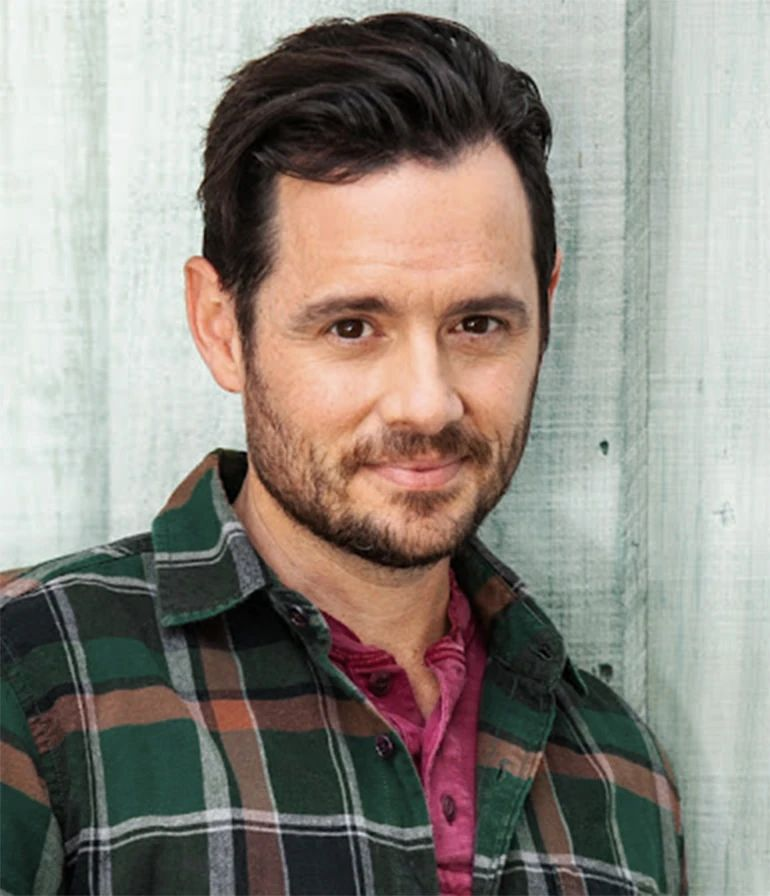
- Education: Arizona State University (BA)
- Occupation: Actor
- Years active: 1999–present
- Website: www.patrickcavanaugh.com

Patrick Cavanaugh is an American actor.

== Early life and education ==
Cavanaugh was raised in Vallejo, California; his parents divorced when he was young. Cavanaugh started performing as a child and did a Young Actor's Workshop at a local community college. Cavanaugh attended Diablo Valley College before transferring to Arizona State University, where he majored in theatre. Cavanaugh was on the ASU improv team.

Cavanaugh is a faculty member of John Rosenfeld Studios in West Hollywood.

Cavanaugh played Pete in the film National Lampoon Presents Dorm Daze, returning as one of the leads in National Lampoon's Dorm Daze 2. Cavanaugh had the recurring role of Smitty Smith, a young, aspiring copywriter, in the AMC series Mad Men and played in the horror comedy movie Transylmania. He also provided the voice for the character Damian Wayne in the animated television series, Batman: The Brave and the Bold.

== Filmography ==
=== Film ===
Year	Title	Role	Notes
2000	Bloody Murder	Tobe	Direct-to-video
2003	Dorm Daze	Pete	
2004	Gamebox 1.0	Peter	
2006	Dorm Daze 2	Peter Hanson	Direct-to-video
2006	The Holiday	Young Man at WGA	
2009	Transylmania	Pete	
2010	Feed the Fish	Hamish the Paramedic	
2011	Stonerville	Slam	
2012	Congratulations	David	
2015	Justice League: Throne of Atlantis	Jimmy Olsen	Voice, direct-to-video
2015	Wingman Inc.	Hubert	
2018	The Honor List	Principal Logan	
2018	Wally Got Wasted	Mitch	
2019	Hosea	Andrew	
2023	Abruptio	Dennis	Voice
2023	The Musical: Welcome to the Night of Your Life	Rodney	

=== Television ===
Year	Title	Role	Notes
2001	Six Feet Under	Mike Cooper	Episode: "The Trip"
2002	Frasier	Ryan	Episode: "Juvenilia"
2002	Felicity	Student #1	Episode: "Future Shock"
2002	The Shield	Kirk	Episode: "Blowback"
2004	The King of Queens	Eric	Episode: "Lost Vegas"
2005	Las Vegas	Randol James Jr.	Episode: "Everything Old Is You Again"
2007	Ugly Betty	Morgue Doctor	2 episodes
2008	In Treatment	Pizza Delivery Guy	Episode: "Sophie: Week Six"
2008–2009	Ctrl+Alt+Del	Ethan	12 episodes
2008–2010	Mad Men	Smitty Smith	12 episodes
2009	Lie to Me	Garret Craywood	Episode: "Love Always"
2010	The Mentalist	David Herren	Episode: "The Blood on His Hands"
2010	Batman: The Brave and the Bold	Damian Wayne	Voice, episode: "The Knights of Tomorrow!"
2011	Love Bites	Owen	Episode: "Modern Plagues"
2011	ThunderCats	Emrick	Voice, episode: "Song of the Petalars"
2011–2012	Ben 10: Ultimate Alien	Winston	Voice, 3 episodes
2012	Bathroomies	Patrick	12 episodes
2013	Grey's Anatomy	Vince Cruse	Episode: "Can't Fight This Feeling"
2013	Melissa & Joey	Kyle	Episode: "Family Feud"
2015	NCIS: Los Angeles	Doug Offerman	Episode: "Blaze of Glory"
2015	CSI: Cyber	Craig Tipton	Episode: "Selfie 2.0"
2016	The Inspectors	Dennis Gaanz	Episode: "No Good Deeds"
2016–2017	Agents of S.H.I.E.L.D.	Burrows	12 episodes
2019	Modern Family	Emcee	Episode: "Stand by Your Man"

=== Video games ===
Year	Title	Role
2008	Dead Space	Additional voices
2010	Command & Conquer 4: Tiberian Twilight	Additional voices
2010	Crackdown 2	Additional voices
2010	Tom Clancy's H.A.W.X 2	Ringo
2010	The 3rd Birthday	Blank
2011	Dead Space 2	Additional voices
2011	L.A. Noire	Stuart Barnes
2013	Aliens: Colonial Marines	Adam Gregor Ethan
2014	Murdered: Soul Suspect	Additional voices
2015	Final Fantasy Type-0 HD	Additional voices
