= National Lampoon's Gold Diggers =

- Theatrical release poster
- Directed by: Gary Preisler
- Screenplay by: Gary Preisler
- Story by: Michael Canale
- Produced by: Don Ashley; Amy Greenspun; Gary Preisler
- Starring: Will Friedle; Chris Owen; Louise Lasser; Renée Taylor; Nikki Ziering
- Cinematography: Thomas L. Callaway
- Edited by: Robert Brakey
- Music by: Christopher Horvath
- Production companies: Delfino Entertainment; National Lampoon Productions; Voyage Entertainment
- Distributed by: P&A Distributors
- Release dates: June 15, 2003 (CineVegas); September 17, 2004 (United States)
- Running time: 90 minutes
- Country: United States
- Language: English
- Box office: $829,140

National Lampoon's Gold Diggers (also known as National Lampoon's Lady Killers) is a 2003 American black comedy film written and directed by Gary Preisler. It features two friends (Will Friedle and Chris Owen) who marry two elderly sisters (Louise Lasser and Renée Taylor) so they can inherit their fortunes when they die.

== Plot ==
Two dimwitted friends try to get rich through small crimes, including an unsuccessful attempt to mug two elderly women. They agree to get married, the women scheme to kill them off and collect on a life insurance policy, the men think the elderly women will die and leave them a big inheritance.

== Cast ==
- Will Friedle as Calvin Menhoffer
- Chris Owen as Leonard Smallwood
- Louise Lasser as Doris Mundt
- Renée Taylor as Betty Mundt
- Nikki Ziering as Charlene
- Rudy De Luca as Uncle Walt
- John Ong as Mr. Woo
- J.J. Cole as Minster
- Carmen Twillie as Gospel Singer
- Gabriel Bologna as Jail Guard
- Rena Riffel as Fantasy Girl
- Saskia as The Bean Machine

== Reception ==
=== Box office ===
The film was considered a dismal failure, with a theatrical run of only 1 week, and earning less than $400,000 as opening weekend receipts (less than $400 per theater).

=== Critical response ===
The film received overwhelmingly negative reviews. On review aggregator website Rotten Tomatoes, the film has a rare approval rating of 0% based on 40 reviews, with an average rating of 2.2/10. The site's critical consensus reads: "It aspires to Farrelly-level offensiveness, but the PG-13 rating and a dearth of decent gags renders Gold Diggers tame, toothless, and dull." The film was included on the site's Worst of the Worst list of movies of the decade (2000–09). According to film review website Metacritic, which compiles and averages critics' review scores, the film is the 11th worst reviewed film of all time. It also holds a score of 6 out 100 based on reviews from 14 critics, indicating "overwhelming dislike".

Janice Page of the Boston Globe panned the film, and wrote: "Put it this way: National Lampoon's Gold Diggers makes "The Anna Nicole Show" look sophisticated. Page continued "Not only is there nothing thoughtful or interesting about this latest ultra-crass contribution to the Lampoon shelf, there's not even anything very funny." Luke Sader of The Hollywood Reporter called it "Cheap-looking, broad and ultimately unnecessary comedy." Justin Chang of Variety described it as "By turns pointless and pointlessly mean-spirited."

== Home media ==
An unrated DVD was released in 2005. National Lampoon's Gold Diggers brought in $1.29 million during its first week on the rental market.

== See also ==
- List of films with a 0% rating on Rotten Tomatoes
