= Vida Guerra =

Cuban-American glamour model (born 1974)

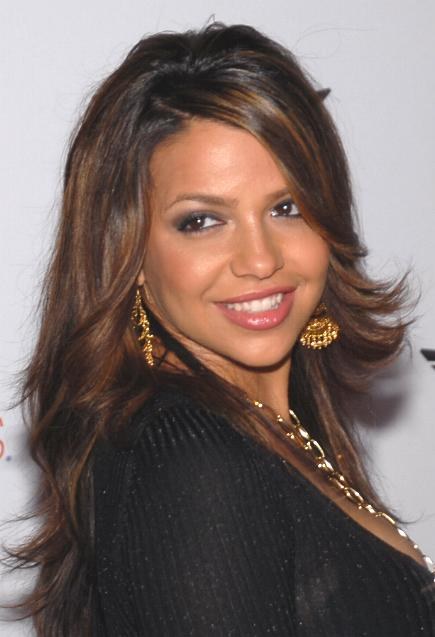
- Guerra at the 2007 American Music Awards after-party in 2007
- Born: March 19, 1974 (age 52); Havana, Cuba
- Years active: 1995–present
- Modeling information
- Hair color: Brown
- Eye color: Brown

Vida Guerra (born March 19, 1974) is a Cuban-born American glamour model and actress. Her first notable appearance was in the American edition of FHM magazine in December 2002; since then, she has modeled for many other men's magazines.

== Early life ==
Vida Guerra was born on March 19, 1974, in Havana, Cuba, and while still a child, migrated with her family to the United States, moving to Perth Amboy, New Jersey. While growing up, she entered several fashion shows modeling swim wear, and has appeared in music videos.

== Career ==
Guerra's first national exposure came when she appeared in a lingerie spread for FHM in December 2002. The magazine later reported that following its publication, almost one third of received mail was from readers demanding more photos of her. She was called back for more photo shoots and became "FHM's Model of the Year" in 2004. Since then, she has been featured in many magazines, including DUB, Smooth, Escape, and Open Your Eyes, often as the cover girl.

Guerra has made multiple appearances on several Spanish language television programs such as entertainment gossip show El Gordo y la Flaca (The Fat guy and The Skinny girl). She has also become a staple in music videos, appearing in "Shake Ya Tailfeather" (Nelly, P. Diddy and Murphy Lee, from the Bad Boys II soundtrack, 2003) and "The New Workout Plan" (Kanye West, 2004), in "Obsession (No Es Amor)" (Frankie J featuring Baby Bash, 2005) among others. In addition, Guerra has appeared in a commercial for Burger King's TenderCrisp Bacon Cheddar Ranch, a couple of sketches on Chappelle's Show (including "R. Kelly's '(I Wanna) Piss on You' Music Video", which spoofed the R. Kelly sex tape), and the film National Lampoon's Dorm Daze 2: College @ Sea.

In April 2005, Guerra's camera phone was allegedly hacked. Dozens of photos, including nude pictures, were widely disseminated on the Internet. Guerra said the nude images were of another woman, and that they had been mixed with genuine, non-nude camera-phone images of her to create the false appearance that she was the naked woman pictured.

Guerra was voted Number 26 in "FHM's Top 100 Sexiest Females" of 2005 and has twice been named the winner of the magazine's "Best Butt Award". She has produced her own swimsuit calendars (and accompanying "behind the scenes" DVDs) and a 2006 DVD titled Vida Guerra: Exposed.

The July 2006 issue of Playboy featured the first formal nude photos of Guerra. Part of her motivation for posing for the magazine, she said, was the camera phone incident; she wanted people to see what she really looked like naked.

The first song from Guerra's debut album, "You Got Me", was leaked to the Internet on November 2, 2006.

In a July 2008 interview on The Jace Hall Show, she spoke about her show Livin' the Low Life, stating that "I didn't like it [lowrider cars] at first, I mean, they were cool, but now that I did the first season I'm actually gonna get one."

She also appeared in the "FHM sexiest woman of the year 2017", ranked at 89th position.

== Personal life ==
Guerra is a vegetarian. Regarding vegetarianism, she has stated "I feel really healthy, and it works on so many different levels, including the condition of my skin". In 2011, she appeared nude in a campaign for People for the Ethical Treatment of Animals (PETA), in support of vegetarianism.

== Filmography ==
=== Film ===
Year	Title	Role	Notes
2003	Writer's Block	Muse	Short
2005	Fake Preacher	Marsha	Video
2006	Dorm Daze 2	Violet	Video
2010	Sardines	Samantha	Short
2010	Lean Like a Cholo	Daisy	
2011	Going Down There	Angela	Short
2012	Filly Brown	Wyatt's Groupie	
2012	Y: The Last Man Rising	Roxy	Short
2013	Not Another Celebrity Movie	Rosalita	
2013	Blood Shed	Khara	
2015	American Justice	Officer Alexa	
2015	Mercy for Angels	Tracy	
2015	Tamales and Gumbo	Gloria	
2016	Hauntsville	El Vida	
2017	CHiPs	Ann	
2017	Perceptions	Sarah	Short
2018	Compton's Finest	Maria	
2023	Bomb Pizza	Nurse	

=== Television ===
Year	Title	Role	Notes
2003–04	Chappelle's Show	Dancer/Stripper	Guest Cast: Season 1–2
2005	Unique Whips	Herself	Episode: "Beauty & the Beemer"
2005	The Drop	Herself	Episode: "Episode #3.13"
2008	Dog Whisperer with Cesar Millan	Herself	Episode: "100th Episode Celebration"
2008	Hacienda Heights	Bella	Episode: "Episode #2.10"
2010	Eastbound & Down	-	Episode: "Chapter 9"
2012	Chiquis 'n Control	Herself	Episode: "Love Is in the Stars"
2014	Edwing D'Angelo: Life Is a Runway	Herself	Episode: "Edwing D'Angelo: Episode IV - Finding Vida Guerra"

== See also ==
- Hip-hop models
