= Detroit Rock City (film) =

1999 film by Adam Rifkin

- Theatrical release poster by Phil Roberts
- Directed by: Adam Rifkin
- Written by: Carl V. Dupré
- Produced by: Barry Levine; Gene Simmons
- Starring: Edward Furlong; Giuseppe Andrews; James DeBello; Sam Huntington; Gene Simmons; Paul Stanley; Ace Frehley; Peter Criss; Natasha Lyonne; Lin Shaye
- Cinematography: John R. Leonetti
- Edited by: Mark Goldblatt; Peter Schink
- Music by: J. Peter Robinson
- Production companies: Base-12 Productions; Takoma Entertainment Group; KISS Nation
- Distributed by: New Line Cinema
- Release date: August 13, 1999
- Running time: 94 minutes
- Countries: United States; Canada
- Language: English
- Budget: $17 million
- Box office: $5.8 million

Detroit Rock City is a 1999 teen comedy film directed by Adam Rifkin and written by Carl V. Dupré. It tells of four teenage boys in a Kiss tribute band who try to see their idols in a concert in Detroit in 1978. It took its title from the Kiss song of the same name. The film stars Edward Furlong, Giuseppe Andrews, James DeBello, Sam Huntington, the members of Kiss (Gene Simmons, Paul Stanley, Ace Frehley and Peter Criss), Natasha Lyonne, and Lin Shaye. It was an international co-production film between the United States and Canada.

The film was primarily shot in Canada, such as at Cedarbrae Collegiate Institute in Toronto and Copps Coliseum in Hamilton, but also at Fox Theatre in Detroit, Michigan, United States. The film received mixed reviews from critics and grossed approximately $6 million against a $17 million budget. It is a 1970s nostalgia film.

== Plot ==
In October 1978 in Cleveland, Ohio, four rebellious teenage boys – Hawk, Lex, Trip Verudie, and Jeremiah "Jam" Bruce – play in Kiss cover band "Mystery" and prepare to see their idols in concert in Detroit, Michigan the following night. Their hopes are dashed when Jam's religiously conservative mother finds their tickets, humiliates Jam over the school intercom, and burns the tickets before having Jam transferred to a Catholic boarding school.

After Trip skips class and wins tickets and backstage passes from a radio contest in Detroit, the boys ditch school and, with Hawk disguised as pizza deliveryman, rescued Jam from the boarding school by drugging Father Phillip McNulty using a pizza topped with hallucinogenic mushrooms before setting off for Detroit in the Volvo of Lex's mother to collect the tickets. En route, they get into a road rage incident with disco fanatics Kenny and Bobby after Trip throws a slice of pizza on their windshield. When Kenny runs them off the road and destroys their Kiss 8-track, the quartet beat up the duo, tie them and their female colleague to a railguard, give them Kiss face paint, send their Trans Am into the creek, and continue their journey before picking up Kenny's girlfriend, Christine, after she dumped him.

In Detroit, the boys discover that Trip did not stay on the phone long enough to give the radio station his information, resulting in the tickets being given to the next caller. While exiting the building, they find the Volvo missing and assumed Christine stole it. The four split up to find Kiss tickets and the Volvo, planning to regroup in 105 minutes. Hawk sees a scalper who suggests that he enter a male stripping contest to raise money for tickets. He gets drunk and loses the contest after vomiting and falling off stage, but is paid by the company and has sex with Amanda Finch, an older woman. He later locates the scalper, only to discover that his tickets are sold out. Trip goes to a convenience store, hoping to mug a younger child for his ticket, but the boy's older athletic brother, Chongo, and his friends confront and extort him for $200. He then plans to rob the store with a Stretch Armstrong doll he stole from some kids, disguised as a gun, but ends up receiving $150 and a kiss from the female clerk after thwarting a genuine robbery attempt. Trip gives the money to Chongo's gang, who assault him for coming up short and steals his wallet.

Lex sneaks backstage with the concert loading crew but is caught and tossed over a fence where he tames a group of vicious dogs with a Frisbee, then saves Christine and the Volvo from two car thieves (who are responsible for stealing the car) at a nearby chop shop. Jam encounters his mother at an anti-Kiss rally. She takes his drumsticks before dragging him to a nearby Cathedral for confession with a perverted priest who is more interested in salacious conversation than an actual confession. He is then greeted by classmate Beth Bumstein, who is moving to Ann Arbor. After admitting their feelings for each other, they have sex in the confession booth before parting ways, agreeing to maintain contact with each other, while Beth gives Jam a custom made shirt with his bands "Mystery" logo. Jam, imbued with new confidence, returns to the rally and criticizes his mother's domineering ways and hypocrisy, saying that her extreme religious views and controlling attitude have only caused him to rebel. He ultimately breaks her spirit by labelling her as a lousy mother and proclaiming to her and the rally attendees that he lost his virginity in a confessional booth. He then demands his drumsticks back, one of which she broke in half. She complies and accepts his life choice.

When the boys meet empty-handed, Jam suggests beating each other up to imply having been mugged for their tickets. Upon their arrival at Cobo Hall, the guards initially doubt the boys' claims, until Trip points out Chongo's gang, who are just entering, as their assailants. When the guards search them, they find Trip's wallet with his Kiss Army picture ID and money, then confiscate Chongo's tickets, and give them to the boys before taking him, his little brother, and his friends into custody. The quartet enters the concert hall as Kiss plays their song "Detroit Rock City". Peter Criss eventually throws a drumstick, which Jam catches.

== Cast ==
- Edward Furlong as Hawk, one of the 4 boys and the frontman for Mystery
- Sam Huntington as Jeremiah "Jam" Bruce, one of the 4 boys and the drummer for Mystery
- Giuseppe Andrews as Lex, one of the 4 boys and the bassist for Mystery
- James DeBello as Trip Verudie, one of the 4 boys and the guitarist for Mystery
- Lin Shaye as Mrs. Bruce, Jam's deeply religious mother with a strict stance against KISS
- Melanie Lynskey as Beth Bumstein, a classmate crushing for Jam who was moving away from Cleveland
- Natasha Lyonne as Christine, a young woman heading to a disco in Detroit
- Miles Dougal as Elvis, the school security guard
- Emmanuelle Chriqui as Barbara, a disco stella accompanying Kenny, Bobby, and Christine
- Shannon Tweed as Amanda Finch, an older lady at the strip club who paid for some "time" with Hawk
- Nick Scotti as Kenny, a disco fanatic whom Mystery sparked ire against
- David Quane as Bobby, Kenny's disco buddy
- Joe Flaherty as Father Phillip McNulty, the headmaster of a Catholic Boarding School that Jam was sent to
- Matthew G. Taylor as Chongo, a brutish Jock who came to the defense of his little brother after Trip tried to mug him
- Robert Smith as Simple Simon, the DJ in Detroit
- Ron Jeremy as Strip Club MC
- Julian Richings as Ticket Taker

== Release ==
=== Box office ===
Detroit Rock City opened in 1,802 theaters on August 13, 1999, and earned $2,005,512 in its opening weekend, ranking number 13 in the domestic box office. By the end of its run, it had grossed only $4,217,115 with an additional $1,608,199 from international sales, bringing its worldwide total gross to $5,825,314. Against an estimated $17 million budget, it was a box office bomb.

=== Critical reception ===
Detroit Rock City received mixed reviews from critics. Review aggregator website Rotten Tomatoes shows that out of 43 reviews, it has a 51% rating. The website's critics consensus reads, "Silly plot, over-the-top directing style." On Metacritic, it has a 33/100 rating based on 18 critics, indicating "generally unfavorable" reviews.

In The New York Times, critic Janet Maslin wrote:

With one of the worst films in recent years already to his credit ("The Dark Backward," the 1991 movie in which Judd Nelson grew a third arm between his shoulder blades), the director Adam Rifkin aims for two with this weary promotional comedy. The cast, which also includes Natasha Lyonne as a disco bimbo, never has much chance to shine. And the main attraction is kept all too understandably under wraps. Though Kiss members get prominent acting credits (and the band's Gene Simmons is a producer), they're in the film for only a couple of heavily edited minutes onstage.

=== Home media ===
Detroit Rock City was released via VHS and DVD on December 21, 1999. DVD special features include four audio commentaries (director Rifkin, selected cast and crew members, and all four original Kiss members), deleted scenes, multi-angle views of the Kiss concert, an instructional segment featuring a step-by-step guitar lesson for "Rock and Roll All Nite", original screen test footage, and DVD-ROM features.

In December 2007, the film was re-released on DVD as an exclusive bonus fifth disc contained within Kissology Volume Three: 1992–2000. It was only available with initial pre-orders sold during VH1 Classic's 24 Hours of Kissmas weekend marathon.

The film was released on Blu-ray in April 2015, containing additional special features, not in the original DVD release.

Toy Robot Video will release the film on 4K UHD on December 15, 2026.

== Soundtrack ==
Detroit Rock City: Music from the Motion Picture

Soundtrack album by various artists
- Released: August 3, 1999
- Genres: Hard rock, heavy metal, glam rock, power pop
- Length: 57:46
- Label: Mercury Records
- Producer: Various artists

Singles from Detroit Rock City: Music from the Motion Picture
- 1. "Cat Scratch Fever" Released: 1999

Professional ratings
Review scores
Source	Rating
AllMusic	3/5 stars

The soundtrack was released on August 3, 1999, by Mercury Records. The album features a mix of classic rock songs and covers of classic rock songs by contemporary artists. It also features a new song by Kiss titled "Nothing Can Keep Me From You".

=== Track listing ===
No.	Title	Writer(s)	Performed by	Length
1.	"The Boys Are Back in Town" (Thin Lizzy cover)	Phil Lynott	Everclear	4:05
2.	"Shout It Out Loud"	Paul Stanley, Gene Simmons, Bob Ezrin	Kiss	2:47
3.	"Runnin’ With the Devil"	David Lee Roth, Eddie Van Halen, Michael Anthony, Alex Van Halen	Van Halen	3:34
4.	"Cat Scratch Fever" (Ted Nugent cover)	Nugent	Pantera	3:48
5.	"Iron Man"	Ozzy Osbourne, Tony Iommi, Geezer Butler, Bill Ward	Black Sabbath	5:54
6.	"Highway to Hell" (AC/DC cover)	Bon Scott, Angus Young, Malcolm Young	Marilyn Manson	3:46
7.	"20th Century Boy" (T. Rex cover)	Marc Bolan	Drain STH	4:28
8.	"Detroit Rock City"	Paul Stanley, Bob Ezrin	Kiss	3:35
9.	"Jailbreak"	Phil Lynott	Thin Lizzy	4:00
10.	"Surrender" (live)	Rick Nielsen	Cheap Trick	4:22
11.	"Rebel Rebel"	David Bowie	David Bowie	4:25
12.	"Strutter" (Kiss cover)	Paul Stanley, Gene Simmons	The Donnas	2:57
13.	"School Days"	Joan Jett, Kim Fowley	The Runaways	2:51
14.	"Little Willy"	Nicky Chinn, Mike Chapman	The Sweet	3:10
15.	"Nothing Can Keep Me From You"	Diane Warren	Kiss	4:04

== See also ==
- List of American films of 1999
