= Nate Richert =

American actor (born 1978)

- Born: Nathaniel Eric Richert; April 28, 1978 (age 48); St. Paul, Minnesota, U.S.
- Occupations: Actor; director; musician; songwriter
- Years active: 1996–present
- Spouse: Malorie Felt (m. 2019; div. 2023)
- Musical career
- Genres: Folk
- Instruments: Vocals; guitar; banjo; drums; harmonica
- Website: Nate Richert Music

Nate Richert (born April 28, 1978) is an American actor, director, musician and songwriter, best known as Harvey Dwight Kinkle in Sabrina the Teenage Witch (1996–2003).

== Career ==
Richert is best known for his seven-year role as Harvey Dwight Kinkle, the love interest and boyfriend of the title character on the live-action television series of Sabrina the Teenage Witch opposite Melissa Joan Hart.

He also appeared in several other television series, including Fantasy Island as Josh Stevens, Touched by an Angel as Matt Fleming, Lovely & Amazing as Other teenage boy, and in Piñata: Survival Island as Jake. Richert also had a starring role in the film Gamebox 1.0 as Charlie Colburn.

Richert also works as a director, musician and songwriter.

Richert made a brief return to acting in the television series Home Work.

== Personal life ==
Richert was born in St. Paul, Minnesota, on April 28, 1978 to parents Wayne and Lisa. Richert eloped and married Malorie Felt on August 11, 2019.

In August 2023, they jointly filed for divorce.

== Filmography ==
=== Film ===
Year	Title	Role	Notes
2001	Lovely & Amazing	Other teenage boy	
2003	Piñata: Survival Island	Jake	
2004	Gamebox 1.0	Charlie	
2004	The Sure Hand of God	Perry Trotter	
2006	H-e-n-r-y	Henry	Short film

=== Television ===
Year	Title	Role	Notes
1996–2003	Sabrina the Teenage Witch	Harvey Dwight Kinkle	Main Role (seasons 1-4 & 6-7); Recurring Role (season 5); 123 episodes
1998	The Tony Danza Show	Jason	Episode: "Mini-pause"
1998	Fantasy Island	Josh Stevens	Episode: "Dreams"
1999	Beggars and Choosers		Episode: "Touched by an Angel"
2000	Touched by an Angel	Matt Fleming	Episode: "Quality Time"
2020	Home Work	He Wasn't Kidnapped	Episode: "It's a Feature"

=== Video games ===
Year	Title	Role	Notes
1999	Sabrina, the Teenage Witch: Spellbound	Harvey Dwight Kinkle	

== Discography ==
- Tone Control (2004)
- Halogen Moon (2012)
- Broken Bottles (2012)
