= After Sex (2007 film) =

2007 film by Eric Amadio

- DVD cover
- Directed by: Eric Amadio
- Written by: Eric Amadio
- Produced by: Eric Amadio; Emilio Diez Barroso; Darlene Caamaño Loquet
- Starring: Mila Kunis; Jane Seymour; Emmanuelle Chriqui; Marc Blucas; Taryn Manning; Zoe Saldaña; Noel Fisher; Dave Franco
- Cinematography: Todd Hickey
- Edited by: Suzanne Hines; Marcos Soriano
- Music by: Stephen Light
- Distributed by: Anchor Bay Entertainment
- Release dates: September 26, 2007 (Calgary Festival); February 19, 2008 (United States)
- Running time: 77 minutes
- Country: United States
- Language: English
- Budget: $825,000 (estimated)

After Sex is a 2007 American romantic comedy-drama film written and directed by Eric Amadio. The plot revolves around several couples having conversations after having sex. It looks at the complexity of modern-day relationships told through eight separate couples. Through dialogue and compromising situations, the film goes from the beginning of a relationship to the aftermath of one and examines every stage in between.

The film had its world premiere at the Calgary International Film Festival on September 26, 2007, and was released in the United States on DVD on February 19, 2008, by Anchor Bay Entertainment.

== Plot ==
1. Christopher and Leslie are a couple in their mid to late 20s who have no-strings-attached sex regularly. After another get-together, they debate and argue over the meaning of their relationship and the nature of sex vs. love, with each of them claiming that the other is the only one developing feelings before both finally say "I love you" to each other.
2. Freddy and Jay are a pair of college guys who, after having sex, argue over Jay refusing to admit that he is gay until Freddy tells him about his teenage years of hiding his homosexuality out of fear of being shunned, and tells Jay that he cannot be honest with others about his sexual orientation before he is honest with himself.
3. Kristy and Sam are a teenage couple, both of whom have just had sex for the first time in Kristy's bedroom, and after some small talk, Sam has to hide when Kristy's mother, Janet, shows up for a talk about sex with Kristy.
4. Nikki and Kat are two college roommates who are in a casual sexual relationship where Nikki allows Kat to perform oral sex on her, but insists that she is not a lesbian and only likes the oral sex because Kat performs it better than a guy. During their visit to the campus library, Kat admits to Nikki that she really is a lesbian, but is comfortable with hiding the fact from her strict parents.
5. Trudy and Gene are middle-aged, interracial couple who have sex in a nature park, and during the walk back, talk about how they first met at an orgy during the "sexual revolution" of the 1970s and about their children who seem not to understand their active sexual lifestyle.
6. Neil and Bob are a closeted 30-something gay couple who have sex in Neil's apartment. Afterwards, Neil drives Bob home to his house, where during the drive, they discuss their roles as gay men in a relationship and who is the "butch" and the "bitch", since they both have different backgrounds and careers. The next day, Neil is revealed as the lead singer in a hair metal band, and Bob is a high school football coach.
7. David and Jordy are a former couple who have met at a cheap motel for sex where David defends his infidelity and womanizing as the person that he is, while Jordy cannot seem to let go of her ex, despite her knowledge of his unapologetic cheating.
8. Marco and Alanna are two strangers who have sex after meeting at a nightclub; later, they arrive in Marco's loft, where they learn more about each other, but Marco is soon disturbed by the dull-witted Alanna's admission of being a high-priced escort and of her love for sex with strangers for money.

== Cast ==
Actor	Character	Notes
Marc Blucas	Christopher	Couple #1
Charity Shea	Leslie	Couple #1
Tanc Sade	Freddy	Couple #2
Noel Fisher	Jay	Couple #2
Natalie Marston	Kristy	Couple #3
Dave Franco	Sam	Couple #3
Mila Kunis	Nikki	Couple #4
Zoe Saldaña	Kat	Couple #4
Jeanette O'Connor	Trudy	Couple #5
John Witherspoon	Gene	Couple #5
Timm Sharp	Neil	Couple #6
James DeBello	Bob	Couple #6
Keir O'Donnell	David	Couple #7
Emmanuelle Chriqui	Jordy	Couple #7
Jose Pablo Cantillo	Marco	Couple #8
Taryn Manning	Alanna	Couple #8
Jane Seymour	Janet	
Mariah Bruna	Raya	
Alexandra Cheron	Jennifer	
