= Shotgun Wedding (2013 film) =

- VOD film poster
- Directed by: Danny Roew
- Written by: Patrick Casey; Worm Miller
- Starring: Mike Damus; Kim Shaw; Joel McKinnon Miller; Elana Krausz
- Production company: Fox Digital Studio
- Distributed by: Netflix
- Release date: April 1, 2013
- Running time: 92 minutes
- Country: United States
- Language: English
- Budget: $9.9 million

Shotgun Wedding is a 2013 American black comedy found footage film directed by Danny Roew and starring Mike Damus, Kim Shaw, and Joel McKinnon Miller. Produced by Fox Digital Studio, it premiered on Netflix on April 1, 2013.

== Plot ==
While drunk, groom-to-be Robert 'accidentally' shoots the maid of honor of his fiancé in the face during a skeet-shooting event. His scheming mother does whatever is needed to ensure the wedding will occur, even conspiring with her ex-husband or kidnapping the maid of honor.

== Cast ==
- Mike Damus as Robert
- Kim Shaw as Rosemary Milton
- Joel McKinnon Miller as Hank Fletcher
- Elana Krausz as Barbara Milton
- Kevin Christy as Ted
