= Chris Owen (actor) =

American actor (born 1980)

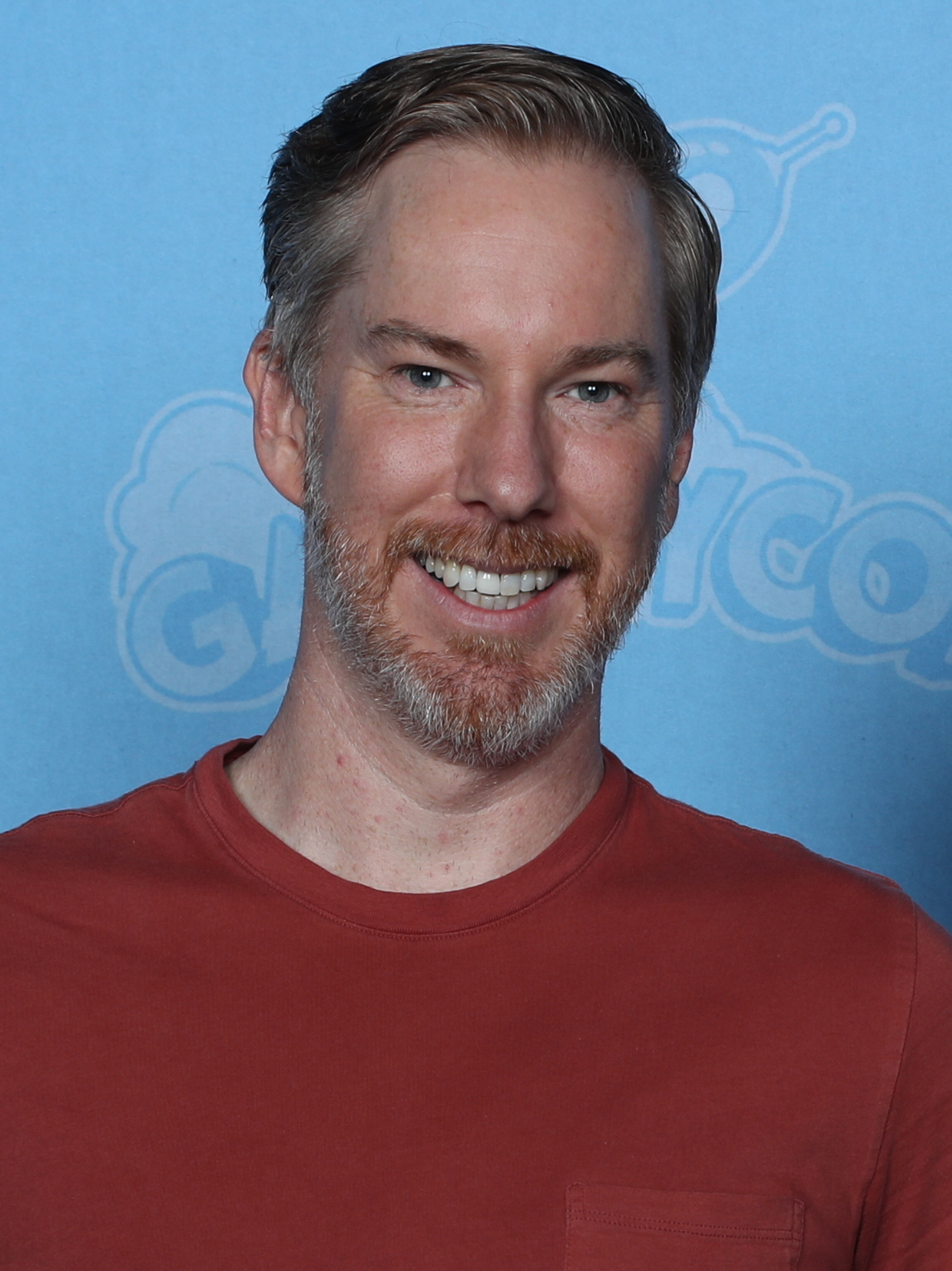
- Owen in 2021
- Born: September 25, 1980 (age 46); Royal Oak, Michigan, U.S.
- Occupation: Actor
- Years active: 1991–present

Chris Owen (born September 25, 1980) is an American actor. He is best known for his supporting role as Chuck "Sherminator" Sherman in the American Pie franchise (1999–2012), appearing in American Pie, American Pie 2, American Pie Presents: Band Camp and American Reunion. Owen has also appeared in multiple National Lampoon films, including starring as the co-lead in National Lampoon's Gold Diggers (2003).

For his supporting role in October Sky (1999), Owen was nominated for the YoungStar Award for Best Performance by a Young Actor in a Drama Film. He has also had supporting roles in the comedy films Angus (1995), Black Sheep (1996), and Ready to Rumble (2000), and the drama films Dear Wendy (2005), The Mist (2007), and Fortress (2012).

== Life and career ==
Owen was born in Royal Oak, Michigan. He began acting as early as age ten, with his first recorded film credit in Le peloton d'exécution (1991), a French-Canadian film. After that, he appeared in numerous films of the 1990s, like Major Payne, Black Sheep, Can't Hardly Wait, She's All That, October Sky and the 1995 film Angus, the first of five films with longtime friend and collaborator Charlie Talbert.

In 1999, Owen appeared in the hit comedy film American Pie as Chuck Sherman, a teenager that boasts himself of being a "ladies man" and goes by "The Sherminator". Owen reprised his role in most of the sequels of the American Pie franchise, including one of the straight-to-DVD spin-offs called American Pie Presents: Band Camp. Aside from Eugene Levy, he is the only actor from the theatrical features to appear in the American Pie Presents direct-to-video spin-off series.

Along with his appearances in the American Pie and National Lampoon franchises, Owen has appeared in TV shows like 7th Heaven, Monk and The Mentalist.

In 2014, a New York Daily News article reported Owen was working as a waiter at a sushi restaurant in Santa Monica, California. In the article, Owen says that "life doesn’t always go the way you planned. I love acting and this job lets me stay in the fight." Since that article was published, Owen has appeared in several films, including a supporting role in The Last Sharknado: It's About Time, as well as a guest spot on Criminal Minds.

During his career, Owen also appeared in the music videos of Something Corporate's song "If You C Jordan" and Dimitri Vegas & Like Mike's song "Mammoth" with Moguai.

== Filmography ==
=== Film ===
| Title | Year | Role | Notes |
|---|---|---|---|
| Le peloton d'exécution | 1991 | Jorge Zebrowski | Television film |
| My Summer Story | 1994 | “Scut” Farkus | Originally released in theaters as It Runs in the Family |
| Major Payne | 1995 | Cadet Wuliger | |
| Angus | 1995 | Troy Wedberg | |
| Black Sheep | 1996 | Hal | |
| The Ride | 1997 | Steve | |
| Veronica's Video | 1997 | Kid Customer | Television film Short film |
| Can't Hardly Wait | 1998 | Klepto Kid | |
| She's All That | 1999 | Derek Funkhouser Rutley | |
| October Sky | 1999 | Quentin Wilson | Nominated – YoungStar Award for Best Performance by a Young Actor in a Drama Film |
| American Pie | 1999 | Chuck "Sherminator" Sherman | |
| Ready to Rumble | 2000 | Isaac | |
| Going Greek | 2001 | Davis | |
| American Pie 2 | 2001 | Chuck "Sherminator" Sherman | |
| Van Wilder | 2002 | Suicidal Freshman | Also known as National Lampoon's Van Wilder |
| A Midsummer Night's Rave | 2002 | Frankie | |
| National Lampoon's Gold Diggers | 2003 | Leonard Smallwood | Also known as National Lampoon's Lady Killers |
| National Lampoon Presents Dorm Daze | 2003 | Booker McFee | Also known as Dorm Daze |
| Hidalgo | 2004 | First Soldier | |
| Dear Wendy | 2005 | Huey | |
| Old Man Music | 2005 | Teenager #1 | Short film |
| American Pie Presents: Band Camp | 2005 | Chuck "Sherminator" Sherman | |
| National Lampoon's Dorm Daze 2: College @ Sea | 2006 | Booker McFee | Also known as Dorm Daze 2 |
| The Mist | 2007 | Norm | |
| Just Add Water | 2008 | Will | |
| Super Capers | 2008 | Igniter Boy | |
| The Life of Lucky Cucumber | 2009 | Rodney Machado | |
| Hit List | 2011 | Wick | |
| Expired | 2011 | Nelson | Short film |
| Fortress | 2012 | Burt | |
| American Reunion | 2012 | Chuck "Sherminator" Sherman | |
| Pretty Bad Actress | 2012 | Officer Young | |
| Undead: A Love Story | 2012 | Chad | Short film |
| Bachelors | 2015 | Floyd | |
| All That Jam | 2016 | Matthew | |
| The Last Sharknado: It's About Time | 2018 | 30 Year Old Gil | |
| Joy & Hope | 2020 | Matt Clark | Television film |
| A Cape Cod Christmas | 2021 | Tom | Television film |
| Off-Time | 2022 | Ross the Cashier | |
| The Epidemic | 2024 | Josh | |
| Money Game | 2024 | Coughlin | |

=== Television ===
| Title | Year | Role | Notes |
|---|---|---|---|
| Picket Fences | 1993 | Milton Lebeck | Episode: "Frog Man" |
| Boy Meets World | 1993 | Ned | Episode: "Cory's Alternative Friends" |
| VR.5 | 1995 | Harassing Boy | Episode: "Pilot" |
| The Faculty | 1996 | Petey | Episode: "Spirit Day" |
| 7th Heaven | 1996–1997 | Sam | 2 episodes |
| Social Studies | 1997 | Collin McGuirk | |
| Sister, Sister | 1997 | Neil Hawkins | Episode: "Inherit the Twin" |
| Meego | 1997 | Tod Johnson | Episode: "It's Good to be King" |
| Good vs. Evil | 1999 | Trekkie | Episode: "Men Are from Mars, Women Are Evil" |
| Brutally Normal | 2000 | Corey | Episode: "Mouth Full of Warm Roses" |
| Cover Me | 2001 | Agent Mace | 2 episodes |
| Everwood | 2003 | Pierson | Episode: "Snow Job" |
| Monk | 2003 | Trainee | Episode: "Mr. Monk and the 12th Man" |
| Without a Trace | 2004 | Trent Barker | Episode: "In the Dark" |
| Brothers & Sisters | 2006 | Taylor the Clerk | Episode: "An Act of Will" |
| The Mentalist | 2011 | Nick aka Megafan8 | Episode: "The Redshirt" |
| Criminal Minds | 2016 | Kevin Decker | Episode: "Scarecrow" |
| Hand of God | 2017 | Mike Kastelein | 2 episodes |

=== Video Games ===
| Title | Year | Role | Notes |
|---|---|---|---|
| The Adventures Of Pinocchio | 1996 | Candlewick | |
