= Josh Miller and Patrick Casey =

American filmmaker (born 1978)

- Born: September 23, 1978 (age 47) December 19, 1978 (age 47); Minneapolis, Minnesota
- Other name: Worm Miller
- Occupations: Filmmaker, podcaster, actor
- Years active: 2000–present

Joshua Miller (born September 23, 1978), sometimes credited under the alias Worm Miller, is an American filmmaker, podcaster, and actor. He often collaborates with his high school friend Patrick ''Pat'' Casey (born December 19, 1978), an American screenwriter, producer, and actor. They are best known for creating the Fox animated series Golan the Insatiable and writing Sonic the Hedgehog (film series), as well as directing the horror-comedy Hey, Stop Stabbing Me!. Miller is the host and co-founder of the long-running Los Angeles–based horror screening series Friday Night Frights. Miller was a frequent contributor to the now-defunct cinema website CHUD.com, contributing reviews, criticism, and interviewing filmmakers, writers, and actors such as Zach Braff, Charlie Day, and Don Cheadle.

== Filmography ==
=== Film ===
Writer

Year	Title	Notes
2003	National Lampoon Presents Dorm Daze	
2003	Hey, Stop Stabbing Me!	Also director and editor (Miller); also producers
2004	Gamebox 1.0	
2006	National Lampoon's Dorm Daze 2	
2009	Transylmania	
2013	Shotgun Wedding	Also additional second unit director (Miller)
2020	Sonic the Hedgehog	
2022	Sonic the Hedgehog 2	
2022	Violent Night	
2024	Sonic the Hedgehog 3	
2026	Violent Night 2	
2027	Sonic the Hedgehog 4	

Acting roles (Miller)

Year	Title	Role	Notes
2003	National Lampoon Presents Dorm Daze	Brady the R.A.	
2003	Hey, Stop Stabbing Me!	Icky, Perkutzitwuzzel	
2003	Special Studies Film II	Man 2	Short film
2006	National Lampoon's Dorm Daze 2	Brady	
2007	Battle for Terra	Tuki	Voice role
2009	Transylmania	Brady	
2013	Shotgun Wedding	Neil	

Acting roles (Casey)

Year	Title	Role
2003	National Lampoon Presents Dorm Daze	Student on Tour
2003	Hey, Stop Stabbing Me!	Herman Schumacher
2006	National Lampoon's Dorm Daze 2	Mike
2009	Transylmania	Mike
2013	Shotgun Wedding	Cooper

=== Television ===
Year	Title	Directors	Writers	Executive Producers	Notes
2013	Bad Samaritans	No	Miller	No	3 episodes
2013–2015	Golan the Insatiable	No	Yes	Yes	Wrote 9 episodes Creator (Miller); Also actor playing various roles (Miller)
2016	12 Deadly Days	Miller	Yes	Yes	Directed 1 episode Wrote 4 episodes
2019	Into the Dark	No	Yes	No	Episode "School Spirit"

Executive consultants

- Powerless (2017) (10 episodes)

== Publications ==
- The Very Hungry Parasite: It's Not What You're Eating, It's What's Eating You (A Bathroom Companion for Adults). Ulysses Press. 2007. ISBN 978-1612432328.
- Miller, Joshua; Casey, Patrick; Correll, Gemma (2014). Oh, the Places You'll Eff Up: A Parody for Your Twenties. Berkeley: Ulysses Press. ISBN 978-1612432915.
- A Zombie's History of the United States: From the Massacre at Plymouth Rock to the CIA's Secret War on the Undead. Ulysses Press. 2010. ISBN 978-1569759196.
- Casey, Patrick; Miller, Josh (2011). The World Reduced to Infographics: From Hollywood's Life Lessons and Doomed Cities of the U.S. to Sociopathic Cats and What Your Drink Order Says About You. New York: Ulysses Press. ISBN 978-1569759899.
- Casey, Patrick (2012). Mason Queensbury in the Parlour of the Occult. Patrick Casey. ISBN 978-1301038954.
- Never Have I Ever: 1,000 Secrets for the World's Most Revealing Game. With Kourtney Jason. Ulysses Press. 2012. ISBN 978-1612431413.
- The United States of Awesome: Fun, Fascinating and Bizarre Trivia about the Greatest Country in the Universe. Ulysses Press. 2012. ISBN 978-1612431130.
