= Nikki Ziering =

American model and actress (born 1971)

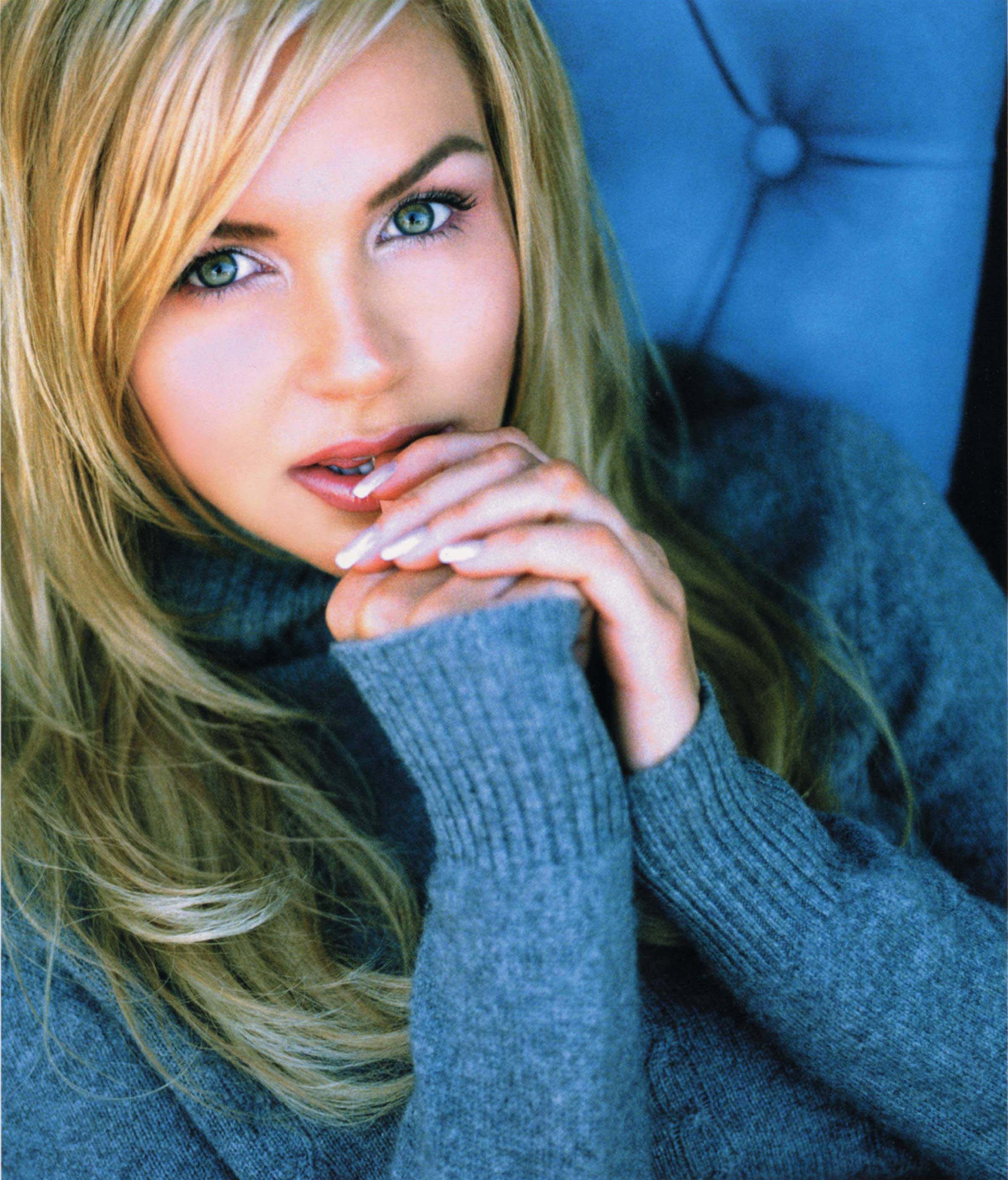

Playboy centerfold appearance
- September 1997
- Preceded by: Kalin Olson
- Succeeded by: Layla Harvest Roberts

Personal details
- Born: Natalie Schieler; August 9, 1971 (age 55) Norwalk, California, U.S.
- Height: 5 ft 8 in (1.73 m)

Natalie "Nikki" Ziering (née Schieler; born August 9, 1971) is an American model and actress. Ziering was Playboy's Playmate of the Month for September 1997.

== Early life ==
Natalie Schieler was born in Norwalk, California. She is of Norwegian and German descent.

== Career ==
Schieler (ex-wife of actor Ian Ziering) was Playboy's Playmate of the Month for September 1997. She appeared on the cover twice, first in August 1997, then in July 2003, along with a feature pictorial. Prior to Playboy, Schieler was a swimwear model usually modeling for Venus Swimwear and Frederick's of Hollywood. She appeared on The Price Is Right as a model from 1999 to 2002.

Her television work includes the reality television series Celebrity Love Island, I'm a Celebrity...Get Me Out of Here!, Celebrity Boot Camp, Celebrity Paranormal Project, and Hulk Hogan's Celebrity Championship Wrestling; being a sideline reporter for the CBS tournament blackjack series Ultimate Blackjack Tour; and co-hosting the comedy show The Grill with Vernon Kay. She has also appeared on The Howard Stern Show, and she was the team captain of the 2004 Los Angeles Temptation squad for the Lingerie Bowl. Her work in film includes American Wedding, National Lampoon's Spring Break, and National Lampoon's Gold Diggers.

== Personal life ==
Schieler converted to Judaism before marrying actor Ian Ziering on July 4, 1997. They divorced in 2002.

With then-boyfriend Rick Reynolds, she has a daughter, Tatum Ella Reynolds, (b. March 27, 2009).

== Partial filmography ==
- Austin Powers in Goldmember (2002)
- Serving Sara (2002)
- American Wedding (2003)
- National Lampoon's Gold Diggers (2003)
- Standing Still (2005)
- National Lampoon's Spring Break (2007)
- Crazy Girls Undercover (2008)
- American High School (2009)

Jami Ferrell	Kimber West	Jennifer Miriam	Kelly Monaco	Lynn Thomas	Carrie Stevens
Daphnée Duplaix	Kalin Olson	Nikki Ziering	Layla Roberts	Inga Drozdova	Karen McDougal
