= Gamebox 1.0 =

- Directed by: David Hillenbrand; Scott Hillenbrand
- Written by: Patrick Casey; Worm Miller; David Hillenbrand; Scott Hillenbrand
- Produced by: Shauna Shapiro Jackson; Bruce Livingston; Rick Tucker; John Coven; Ashley R. Friedman; David Hillenbrand; Scott Hillenbrand; David A. Jackson; Albert Miniaci
- Starring: Nate Richert; Danielle Fishel; Patrick Kilpatrick; Patrick Renna
- Distributed by: Lionsgate
- Release date: 2004
- Running time: 83 minutes
- Language: English

Gamebox 1.0 is a 2004 film starring Nate Richert and Danielle Fishel, about a video game that traps the player inside it when played. It was directed by the brothers David and Scott Hillenbrand, who wrote the screenplay with Patrick Casey and Worm Miller. It was released on DVD in the United States on April 10, 2007.

== Plot ==
Charlie Colburn (Nate Richert) is a video game tester with a troubled past. One day, he receives a new console to test in the mail. This system, the Gamebox 1.0, is like no other system he's seen before: by tapping into the cerebral cortex of the brain, it literally immerses the player in a virtual reality world, killing them if they lose. The game draws on his memories, so the heroine is modeled after his dead girlfriend (Danielle Fishel), and the villain is the dirty cop (Patrick Kilpatrick) who murdered her. He has to play through three different games to win: Crime Spree, Zombie Land and Alien Planet.

== Production ==
Filming for Gamebox 1.0 used primarily chroma key compositing, as much of the film took place in a game world. In an interview with the Daily Bruin, Fishel noted that this required that she and the other actors rely on each other and their own imaginations since "[they] spent four weeks, 14 to 18-hour days surrounded by neon green paint."

== Release ==
Gamebox 1.0 premiered in 2004. It was released to DVD on April 10, 2007 through Lionsgate.

== Reception ==
Rick Bentley reviewed Gamebox 1.0 for The Fresno Bee, rating it a D+ and stating "There are only two words to describe the lousy graphics, bad acting and stupid story in "Gamebox 1.0": game over." Scott Weinberg also reviewed the film for DVD Talk, writing to "ignore the DVD cover. This is not a horror flick. But if you're a hardcore video game junkie and you've got a soft spot for scrappy little indie flicks, I'd call Gamebox 1.0 worthy of the rental fee."
