= Transylmania =

- Theatrical release poster
- Directed by: David Hillenbrand; Scott Hillenbrand
- Written by: Patrick Casey; Worm Miller
- Produced by: Radu Badica; Viorel Sergovici; Kim Swartz; Sanford Hampton; Jor Van Kline
- Starring: Patrick Cavanaugh; James DeBello; Tony Denman; Musetta Vander; Jennifer Lyons; Oren Skoog; Paul H. Kim; David Steinberg; Irena A. Hoffman
- Distributed by: Full Circle
- Release date: December 4, 2009
- Running time: 92 minutes
- Country: United States
- Language: English
- Box office: $408,229

Transylmania is a 2009 American comedy horror film directed by David and Scott Hillenbrand, and co-written by Patrick Casey and Worm Miller.

Released theatrically on December 4, 2009, Transylmania was universally panned by critics, and set a box office record for the worst opening for a film playing in over 1,000 theaters, ultimately grossing $408,229 worldwide, making it a box-office bomb.

== Plot ==
16th-century Romania is terrorized by vampire king Radu and his lover, the evil sorceress Stephenia. Vampire hunter Victor van Sloan tricks Stephenia into opening an enchanted music box, which sucks in her soul. Escaping out a window into daylight, Van Sloan falls to his death thanks to his moronic son's accidentally moving the hay cart which had been positioned to soften his landing. The music box is washed away in the river, leading Radu to begin a centuries-long search for it.

In the present, several American college students are convinced by their friend Rusty (who bears an uncanny resemblance to Radu) to spend a semester in Romania at Razvan University, which was formerly Radu's castle; his true reason is to meet his computer girlfriend Draguta. At the university, they meet the diminutive dean Floca and self-defense teacher Teodora, Van Sloan's descendant who has been tasked with preventing Radu from getting the music box. Radu returns to the castle that night and begins collecting blood as part of a ceremony to revive Stephenia. Unfortunately, a truly dumb blonde now owns the music box and accidentally lets her blood fall on the gem inside it; as a result, Stephenia can now take possession of her body when the music box is open. Rusty learns that Draguta is the dean's hunchback daughter; he is forced into a relationship with Draguta by Floca after finding her previous boyfriend locked in a torture room for simply standing her up. The other students discover that Floca kidnapped girls from the university for experiments to remove their heads for a body swap, to give Draguta a normal body. They take the still-living head of their friend just as Floca returns with Draguta for the procedure.

At the same time, Teodora has mistaken Rusty for Radu, due to the costume he chose for a vampire-themed party that he missed due to accidentally being given drugs that made him woozy. Rusty is accidentally taken by Radu's minions to enact the ritual to revive Stephenia; however, as this would require ripping out the heart of her host, Rusty is forced to shut the music box and listen to his friend's idiotic ramblings of how she thinks aliens are controlling her. Assaulted by her boyfriend, Rusty gives up on trying to help as his friends are too stupid to listen. Rusty spots Radu and pretends to be a reflection through a frame used for pictures to buy time to hide; Teodora ends up finding the wrong one, but is forced to eliminate Radu's minions.

Rusty attempts hiding in the dance hall, but is confronted by Teodora; he attempts reasoning, but she is too stubborn to believe "vampire lies". The real Radu arrives along with Stephenia, causing a stressful back and forth. With Rusty and Radu side-by-side, Teodora and Stephenia realize they were both wrong. Unfortunately, campus security men arrest Teodora, leaving Radu's execution to Cliff, a moron who's been attempting to pick up chicks by pretending to be a vampire hunter, who can't tell the two apart despite the obvious difference in their voices. The crossbow fires accidentally, hitting Radu in the heart and reducing him to ash; Teodora smashes the music box, which causes Stephenia's corpse to dissolve, and free her host.

A time skip reveals Cliff became a Razvan professor, printing a fabrication about how Radu was defeated. He also explains the fates of his friends, while some have great careers, other are not so fortunate. In the case of Rusty, though he is now married to the attractive Draguta, their child is highly deformed despite her different body (it has dean Floca's pointed hair, goatee, and Draguta's hump). Dean Floca was also arrested for his crimes. As for Teodora, she moved to America as there was no longer anything to hunt in Romania; she became a cop, but has trouble telling deformed people apart from actual monsters.

== Cast ==
- Patrick Cavanaugh as Pete
- Tony Denman as Newmar
- Paul H. Kim as Wang
- Jennifer Lyons as Lynne
- Oren Skoog as Rusty / Radu
- David Steinberg as Dean Floca
- Musetta Vander as Teodora van Sloan
- Irena A. Hoffman as Draguta Floca
- Natalie Garza as Lia
- Nicole Garza as Danni
- Ali Adawiya as Night club owner
- James DeBello as Cliff
- Ashley Barron as Pretty Girl
- Adriana Butoi as Asha
- Colin Campbell as Siegfried Fischbacher
- Patrick Casey as Mike
- Kommerina DeYoung as Romanian stripper
- Carey Embry as Laverne
- Jessica Mei Gershen as Contortionist
- Mandinga
- Elena-Cristina Marchisano as Carrie
- Désirée Malonga as Niobe
- Worm Miller as Brady
- Bonnie Morgan as Woman Contortionist
- Jonathan Perkins
- Claudiu Trandafir as Van Sloan
- Paul Zies as Bearded Guy
- Brett Gipson as 3-legged Yoga Student
- Annette Charles as Administrator

== Release ==
The film premiered at American Film Market in November 2008, and was screened at the European Film Market in February 2009. Unlike the straight-to-DVD release of National Lampoon's Dorm Daze 2, the film had a theatrical release on December 4, 2009, opening in 1,007 theaters. The DVD was released on April 27, 2010, by Sony Pictures Home Entertainment.

== Production ==
The movie was entirely shot in Corvin Castle, Romania in 2007 and the Vgp Effects & Design was created by Vincent Guastini.

== Reception ==
=== Critical ===
On the review aggregator website Rotten Tomatoes, 0% of 19 critics' reviews are positive, with an average rating of 2.0/10. The website's consensus reads: "Never aiming higher than threadbare jokes and offensive attempts at politically incorrect humor, Transylmania is a vampire comedy that truly sucks." Metacritic, which uses a weighted average, assigned the film a score of 8 out of 100, based on 10 critics, indicating "overwhelming dislike".

Tom Russo for The Boston Globe called it "woefully dim-witted". Steven Hyden for The A.V. Club called it "such a colossal comedic misfire that it makes the execrable Scary Movie films look like masterworks of Preston Sturges-esque genius by comparison". Frank Scheck for The Hollywood Reporter called it a "lame vampire spoof" that "has no bite". Adam Markovitz for Entertainment Weekly called it "a no-stars, no-plot, no-point vampire spoof about a group of coeds studying abroad in a haunted castle, Transylmania boasts the kind of acting and direction usually relegated to the adult section of your local video store". Mike Hale of The New York Times wrote that Transylmania is "destined to spend a short and painful life in theaters and then join the ranks of the DVD and late-night-cable undead". Robert Able of the Los Angeles Times wrote that "if your idea of a good time is laughing with repulsion at a humpbacked Romanian nympho with a torture-loving midget dad, or tittering every time a bong appears, a darkened theater awaits you". Brian Orndorf said that "I surveyed the crowd at the screening I attended, feeling the chill in the air as seven strangers sat in stone-cold silence – not a single laugh from anyone. The eighth moviegoer? Fast asleep five minutes in. I've never envied a person more".

It is listed in position 33 of Rotten Tomatoes' "100 Worst Movies of All Time".

=== Box office ===
The film was a major box office disaster and had an extremely poor opening, at #21 with only $263,941 from 1,007 theaters, making it the 3rd worst movie opening since 1982 for films which opened in more than 600 theaters, and the worst ever at the time for films opening in over 1,000 theaters.

=== 2012 lawsuit ===
David and Scott Hillenbrand were sued by their financial backers for financial recovery in 2012. Kim Swartz, an attorney at Mitchell Silberberg representing the Hillenbrands, says in response, "This is a completely meritless lawsuit. The plaintiffs saw the finished film numerous times before they chose to invest. In any event, David and Scott Hillenbrand and their team of top professionals did everything they could to try to get their investors a return on their investment, even to the Hillenbrands' own financial detriment, and, as stated in the Complaint, in spite of the plaintiffs' failure to provide the agreed upon P&A funds in a timely manner. The Hillenbrands look forward to having the plaintiffs' completely meritless claims dismissed and to prosecuting their own claims."

In August 2012, the Hillenbrands' production company, Hill & Brand Productions 7 LLC, counter-sued Third Eye Capital Corporation and Strative Capital LTD for fraud and breach of contract seeking damages of no less than $107,000,000.00 and alleging a scheme to defraud Hill & Brand Productions 7 LLC, and to exploit the name and reputation of the Hillenbrands for their own financial gain.

== See also ==
- List of films with a 0% rating on Rotten Tomatoes
- Vampire film
