= Hey, Stop Stabbing Me! =

- Directed by: Worm Miller
- Written by: Patrick Casey; Worm Miller
- Produced by: Patrick Casey; Worm Miller
- Starring: Patrick Casey; Andy "Hippa" Kriss; Maria A. Morales; N. David Prestwood; Jack Shreck; Sean Hall; Worm Miller
- Music by: Sean Hall; Jack Shreck
- Distributed by: Sub Rosa
- Release date: 2003
- Running time: 90 minutes
- Country: United States
- Language: English

Hey, Stop Stabbing Me! is a 2003 American comedy horror film starring Patrick Casey and directed by Worm Miller; Miller and Casey also co-wrote the script. The duo went on to write Golan the Insatiable for Fox's Animation Domination HD programming block.

The film was shot on location in Bloomington, Minnesota.

== Plot ==
Hey, Stop Stabbing Me! is the story of Herman Schumacher (Patrick Casey) and his new post-collegiate life. After school ends Herman finds life a lot harder than he thought. He needs to find a place to live, a job, and new friends. The first two are solved surprisingly easy when he unknowingly moves into a house with a serial killer to fill one of the many vacancies and then gets a job as a "World Historian" which mainly consists of digging holes in an empty field.
