= Boti Bliss =

American actress

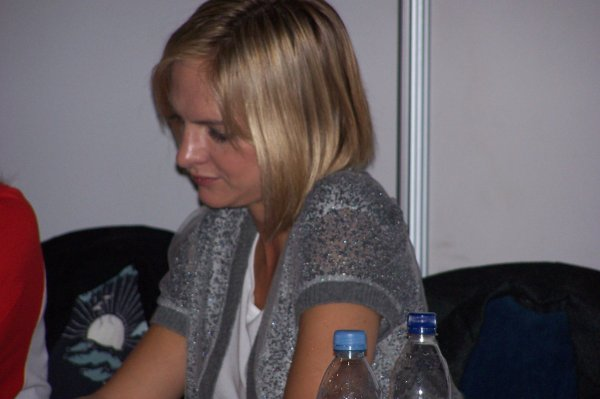
- Bliss in 2006
- Born: Boti Ann Bliss; October 23, 1975 (age 50); United States
- Occupation: Film/television actress
- Years active: 1994–present
- Spouse: Blair Hayes (m. 2010)

Boti Ann Bliss (/ˈboʊti/ BOH-ti; born October 23, 1975) is an American film and television actress. Notable roles include her semi-recurring role as Maxine Valera in the television crime drama CSI: Miami. Her other roles include the 2002 film Ted Bundy and 2003 film National Lampoon Presents Dorm Daze.

== Personal life ==
Bliss had an unusual childhood, growing up along with her brother and three sisters in a teepee outside Aspen, Colorado, with her stepfather and her mother, who knitted and sold custom sweaters.

She married film director Blair Hayes in 2010. She gave birth to a boy, Ashby Buck, on March 15, 2011.

== Filmography ==
=== Film ===
Year	Title	Role	Notes
1998	Broken and Bleeding	Moira	
1999	Warlock III: The End of Innocence	Robin	Direct to video
2000	Dumped	June	Direct to video
2001	Bubble Boy	Cashier	
2001	Panic	Zoe	
2002	Ted Bundy	Lee	
2003	Power Play	Sara Rose	
2003	National Lampoon Presents Dorm Daze	Dominique	
2005	The Mostly Unfabulous Social Life of Ethan Green	Gretyl	
2008	Pulse 2: Afterlife	Marta	Direct to video
2010	Night Music	Tricia	
2012	Gabe the Cupid Dog	Sarah	
2014	Seeing Each Other	Julie	
2014	Lucky Dog	Amber	
2016	Dark Paradise	Tamara	Announced
2016	Albedo Absolute	Chloe	Short, completed
2021	Fourth Grade	Natasha	
TBD	Stage Kiss	Sonny	Post-production

=== Television ===
Year	Title	Role	Notes
1997	Cybill	Kyra	"All of Me"
1997	Cracker	Tina	"'Tis Pity She's a Whore"
1997	Nash Bridges	Lorraine Robbins	"Rampage"
1997	Pacific Blue	Amy Duke	"Runaway"
1998	The Magnificent Seven	Emily	"Working Girls"
1998	Love Boat: The Next Wave	Theresa	Episode: "Smooth Sailing"
1998	The Secret Lives of Men	Kim #1	"Phil's Problem"
1998	The Pretender	Sandi	"Parole"
1998-99	Nash Bridges	Angela Martin	"Resurrection", "Pump Action"
2000	Charmed	Abbey	"Once Upon a Time", "Sight Unseen"
2003-09	CSI: Miami	Maxine Valera	Recurring role
2010	The Young and the Restless	Lynn Jacobs	2 episodes
2010	The Perfect Teacher	Rachel	TV film
2011	The Perfect Roommate	Carrie Remington	TV film
2013	Merryland	Bethesda	TV film
2013	Bones	Judith Lanfranco	"The Dude in the Dam"
2014	Christmas Icetastrophe	Faye Ratchet	TV film
2015	Perception	Connie Meier	"Meat"
2015	Maron	Meg	"Professor of Desire"
2015	A Teacher's Obsession	Jane	TV film
2016	Roadside Stars	Julie	TV film
2016	Remote Paradise	Tamara	TV film
2019	Deadly Switch	Maribell	TV film

=== Video game ===
Year	Title	Role	Notes
2004	CSI: Miami	Maxine Valera (voice)	
