= Désirée Malonga =

Romanian actress and model

- Born: Désirée Parfait Malonga; September 26, 1981 (age 44); Bucharest, Romania
- Occupations: Actress, model
- Years active: 2003–present
- Notable work: Désirée McLoud on Trăzniți din NATO
- Children: 1

Désirée Parfait Malonga (born September 26, 1981) is a Romanian actress and model. Malonga is best known in Romania for playing Désirée McLoud on the hit Prima TV comedy series Trăsniți din NATO. Her mother is half Romanian and half Greek and her father who studied medicine in Romania is from the Republic of the Congo.

== Filmography ==
Film
Year	Title	Role
2004	Milionari de weekend	Kiki
2005	Hellraiser: Hellworld	Derrick's sexy dancer (as Désirée Malonga)
2009	Transylmania	Niobe

Television
Year	Title	Role
2003	Trăsniți din NATO	Désirée McLoud

== Personal life ==
Désirée is raising alone the daughter from her past boyfriend. In 2012, she married Florin Maftei.
