= Mali Finn =

American casting director (1938–2007)

- Born: Mary Alice Finn; March 8, 1938; Danville, Illinois, U.S.
- Died: November 28, 2007 (aged 69); Sonoma County, California, U.S.
- Education: University of Minnesota (BSc.Th.)
- Occupation: Casting director
- Children: 1

Mali Finn (born Mary Alice Mann; March 8, 1938 – November 28, 2007) was an American casting director. She cast numerous actors in successful films, including Edward Furlong, Brad Renfro, Leonardo DiCaprio, and Russell Crowe.

== Biography ==
Born as Mary Alice Mann on March 8, 1938, in Danville, Illinois, she later moved to Minneapolis, where she received a bachelor's degree in theater from the University of Minnesota. She was married to Don Finn, a theater director and professor of directing and acting at The Guthrie and California State University Fullerton, and had one child with him.

=== Career ===
In the early 1980s Finn was a beloved drama teacher at Holland High School in Holland, Michigan, where she challenged her students with difficult productions such as You Can't Take It with You. She also lectured in English Literature at Hope College in the early 70s. In 1981 the couple moved to Newport Beach, California, where Finn's career as a casting director began. She already had a handful of casting credits on her résumé, including The Untouchables (1987), when she established her own firm, Mali Finn Casting, in 1989. She boosted Leonardo DiCaprio's career by casting him in the James Cameron film Titanic (1997); she also cast Russell Crowe in L.A. Confidential (1997). Finn discovered actor Brad Renfro when he was ten years old and cast him in Joel Schumacher's The Client (1994).

Finn cast almost 90 movies and television series during her career. Director Curtis Hanson worked with her on four of his films: L.A. Confidential, Wonder Boys (2000), 8 Mile (2002), and Lucky You (2007).

She was featured prominently in the "Fame" episode of The Human Face, presented by John Cleese.

Finn won numerous awards for her work, including the Artios Award for Best Casting for both L.A. Confidential and the HBO movie 61* (2001); in addition, she was nominated for three Artios Awards for Titanic. She also won an Emmy Award for Outstanding Casting for a Miniseries, Movie, or Special for 61* and was nominated for another Emmy for Outstanding Individual Achievement in Casting for Indictment: The McMartin Trial (1995).

=== Death ===
Finn retired in 2006 due to melanoma, which was the cause of her death at age 69 on November 28, 2007, at her home in Sonoma County, California.

== Selected casting director credits ==
- 10,000 B.C (2008)
- Dirty Hands (2008)
- Lucky You (2007)
- The Number 23 (2007)
- The Assassination of Jesse James by the Coward Robert Ford (2007)
- Shooter (2007)
- Running with Scissors (2006)
- Seraphim Falls (2006)
- Walker Payne (2006)
- North Country (2005)
- Dark Water (2005)
- The Assassination of Richard Nixon (2004)
- Undertow (2004)
- Raising Helen (2004)
- The Girl Next Door (2004)
- The Big Bounce (2004)
- The Matrix Revolutions (2003)
- The Matrix Reloaded (2003)
- All the Real Girls (2003)
- Out of Time (2003)
- Phone Booth (2002)
- 8 Mile (2002)
- Never Get Outta the Boat (2002)
- K-19: The Widowmaker (2002)
- High Crimes (2002)
- Joy Ride (2001/I)
- 61* (2001) (TV)
- Tigerland (2000)
- The Weight of Water (2000)
- Running Mates (2000) (TV)
- Reindeer Games (2000)
- The Green Mile (1999)
- The Love Letter (1999)
- Best Laid Plans (1999)
- The Matrix (1999)
- 8MM (1999)
- Your Friends & Neighbors (1998)
- Titanic (1997)
- Batman & Robin (1997)
- L.A. Confidential (1997)
- Sunday (1997)
- The Chamber (1996)
- Foxfire (1996)
- A Time to Kill (1996)
- Eye for an Eye (1996)
- Batman Forever (1995)
- The Cure (1995)
- The Client (1994)
- True Lies (1994)
- The Air Up There (1994)
- House of Cards (1993)
- Super Mario Bros. (1993)
- That Night (1992)
- Hot Shots! (1991)
- Terminator 2: Judgment Day (1991)
- Welcome Home, Roxy Carmichael (1990)
- Pacific Heights (1990)
- Flatliners (1990)
- Split Decisions (1988)
- Lady in White (1988)
- The Untouchables (1987)
- Outrageous Fortune (1987) (as Mally Finn)
