= Collector (2008 film) =

- Directed by: Dempsey Tillman
- Screenplay by: Dempsey Tillman
- Produced by: V.W. Scheich
- Starring: Brad Renfro; Matthew Boylan
- Cinematography: John Garret, Thomas Scott Stanton
- Edited by: Dempsey Tillman
- Production company: IndieFlix
- Distributed by: IndieFlix
- Release date: January 1, 2008
- Running time: 14 minutes
- Country: United States
- Language: English
- Budget: $20,000

Collector is a 2008 American short thriller film written and directed by Dempsey Tillman. Shot on November 4–5, 2007, the 14-minute film starred Brad Renfro as a troubled young man struggling with hallucinations and the pressure of proving himself capable of being a father. It later gained attention as one of Renfro's final performances before his death in January 2008.

== Plot ==
Justin (Brad Renfro) hangs by a thread in a nightmarish world of desperation. A sharp-tongued visitor (Matthew Boylan) arrives at Justin's door and launches a relentless interrogation that forces him to the edge of sanity. With the clock ticking loudly on second chances, Justin must face his darkest fears before it is too late.

== Cast ==
- Brad Renfro as Justin
- Matthew Boylan as the Collector

== Production ==
The short film was shot on November 4–5, 2007, and was directed by Dempsey Tillman, who wrote it in 2006. The director stumbled onto Brad Renfro through a director of photography he was working with who was a neighbor of the young actor. The DP recommended Renfro, so Tillman rented The Client and some of his other films. Although he initially thought Renfro might have been too young for the role, he changed his mind after meeting him, stating, "Then I met with Brad, and he started talking and all this stuff came out, a whole lot of emotion and intensity. I was like, 'This guy is perfect'". According to Tillman, Renfro had demonstrated a strong personal connection to his character during rehearsals, recalling that the actor told him, "This story's really close to me. I have a kid that nobody knows about", which led the director to conclude, "I knew that's where he was drawing from for the character".

During production, Tillman also said Renfro surprised him by gathering the cast and leading a prayer before filming, and described him as "fantastic", adding that "he really sent the character to a place that I don't think that I really could have written all the tiny little nuances that he did", concluding, "He elevated everything that we did — that we tried to do, at least". The film later drew additional attention for featuring one of Brad Renfro's final performances before his death on January 15, 2008, in Los Angeles.

== Critical reception ==
AllMovie rated the film one out of five stars.

=== Accolades ===
Award	Category	Nominee(s)	Result	Ref.
Action On Film International Film Festival (2008)	Best Actor – Short	Brad Renfro	Won	
