= Natalie Wood filmography =

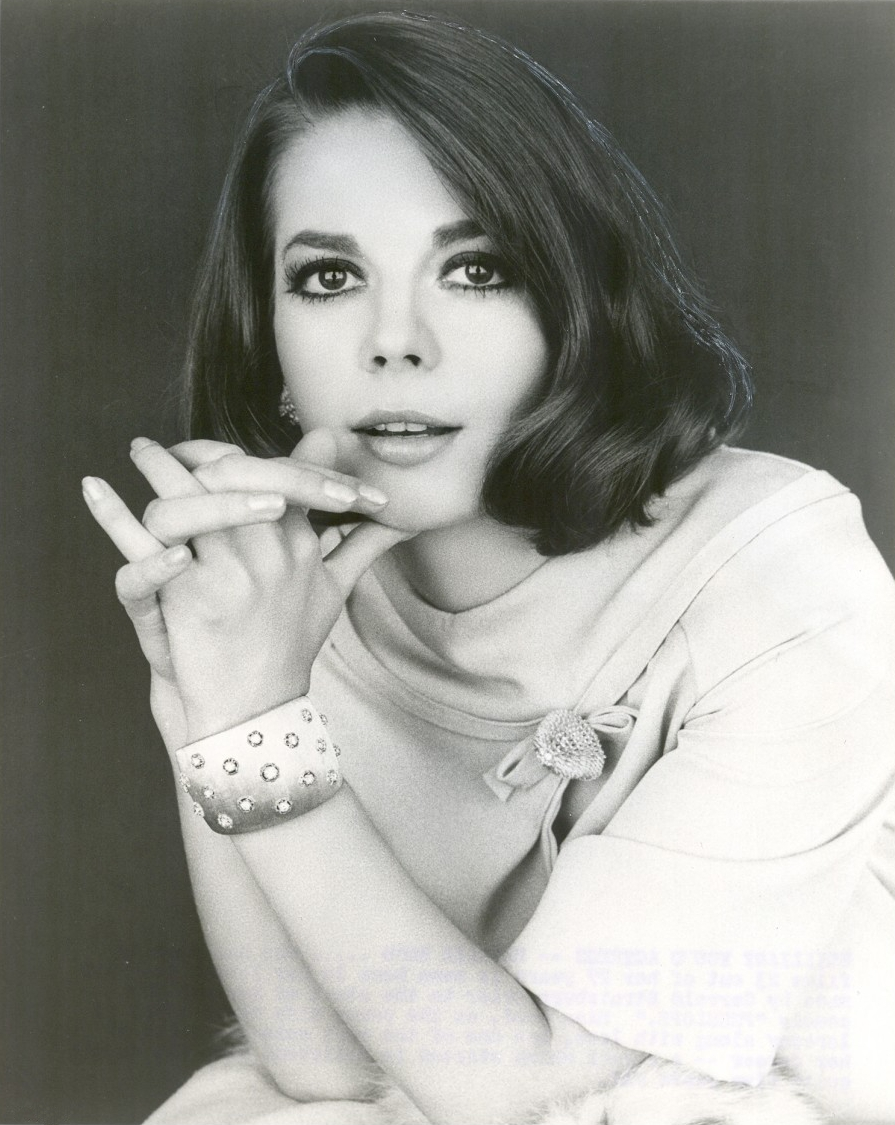
Publicity photo for the film Penelope (1966)

Natalie Wood (1938–1981) was an American actress who started her career as a child by appearing in films directed by Irving Pichel. Wood's first credited role was as an Austrian war refugee in the Pichel-directed Tomorrow Is Forever (1946) with Claudette Colbert and Orson Welles. The following year, she played a child who does not believe in Santa Claus in the Christmas comedy-drama Miracle on 34th Street (1947) opposite Maureen O'Hara, John Payne, and Edmund Gwenn.

Wood appeared as a regular cast member in the television sitcom The Pride of the Family (1953). Two years later, she starred as a recalcitrant teenager in Rebel Without a Cause with James Dean, for which she was nominated for the Academy Award for Best Supporting Actress, and received the Golden Globe Award for Most Promising Newcomer – Female. The following year, Wood appeared as a kidnapped girl in the John Ford-directed western The Searchers (1956) with John Wayne and Jeffrey Hunter. Two years later, she played a Jewish student in Marjorie Morningstar (1958) opposite Gene Kelly, and an American girl living in World War II France who is caught in a love triangle in Kings Go Forth (1958) with Frank Sinatra and Tony Curtis.

In 1961, Wood starred as a teenager struggling with sexual repression in the period drama Splendor in the Grass with Warren Beatty, and as Maria in the highly successful musical film West Side Story. For the former, she received a nomination for Best Actress at the Academy Awards, British Academy Film Awards, and Golden Globes. She followed West Side Story with another musical film Gypsy (1962), in which she played the title role of the burlesque entertainer Gypsy Rose Lee. She was nominated for the Golden Globe Award for Best Actress – Motion Picture Comedy or Musical. The following year, Wood portrayed a woman who becomes pregnant following a one-night stand in Love with the Proper Stranger (1963) with Steve McQueen. For her performance she garnered her second nomination for the Academy Award for Best Actress, and Golden Globe Award for Best Actress in a Motion Picture – Drama.

In 1969, she starred in the comedy Bob & Carol & Ted & Alice about two couples who decide to pursue an open relationship. Four years later, Wood appeared opposite Robert Wagner in the television film The Affair. She received the Golden Globe Award for Best Actress – Television Series Drama for her portrayal of an adulterous wife in the miniseries From Here to Eternity (1979). Two years later, she died of drowning during the filming of her last film Brainstorm, which was posthumously released in 1983.

== Film ==
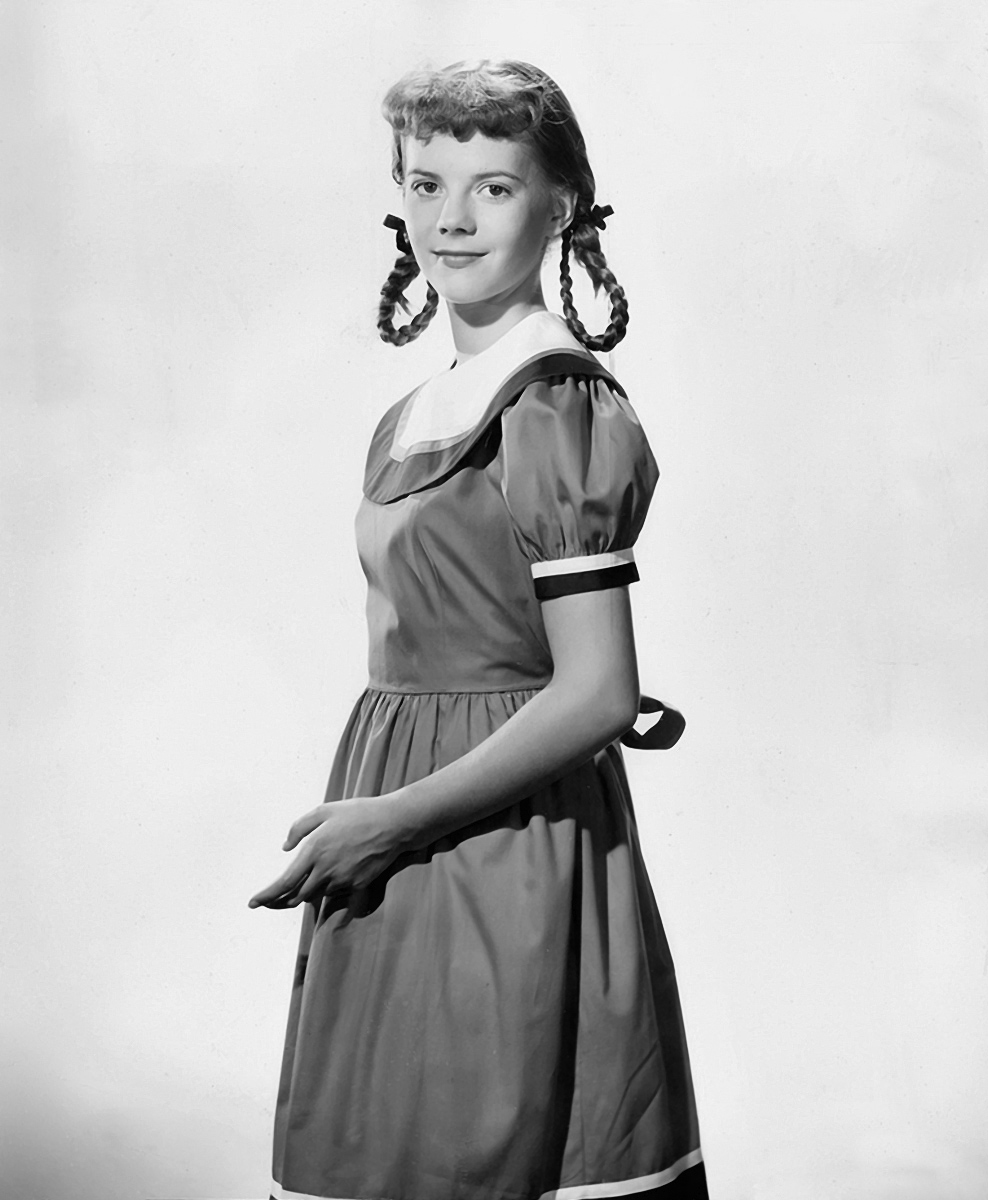
Wood in a 1951 publicity photo

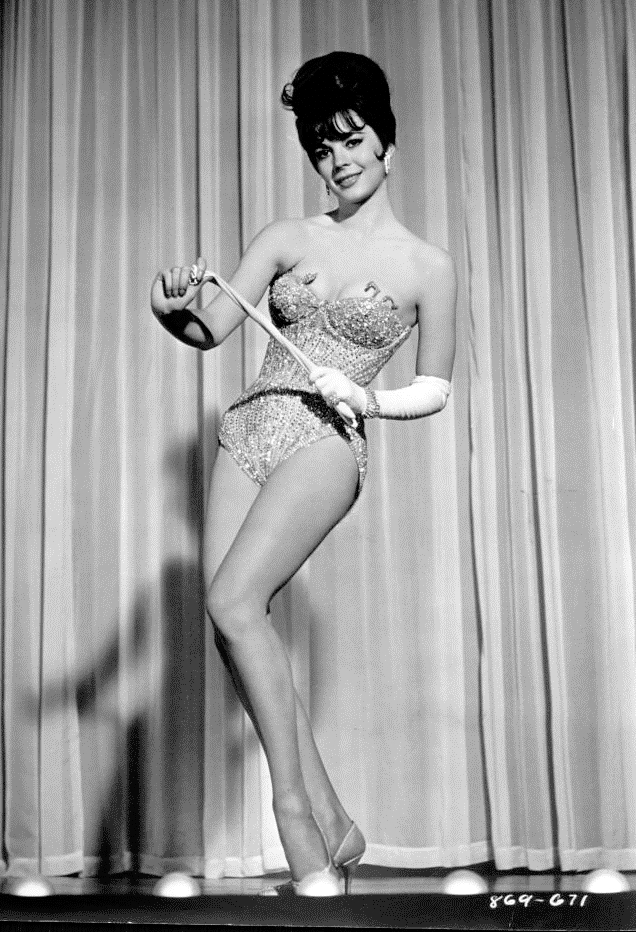
Wood in a publicity photo for Gypsy (1962)

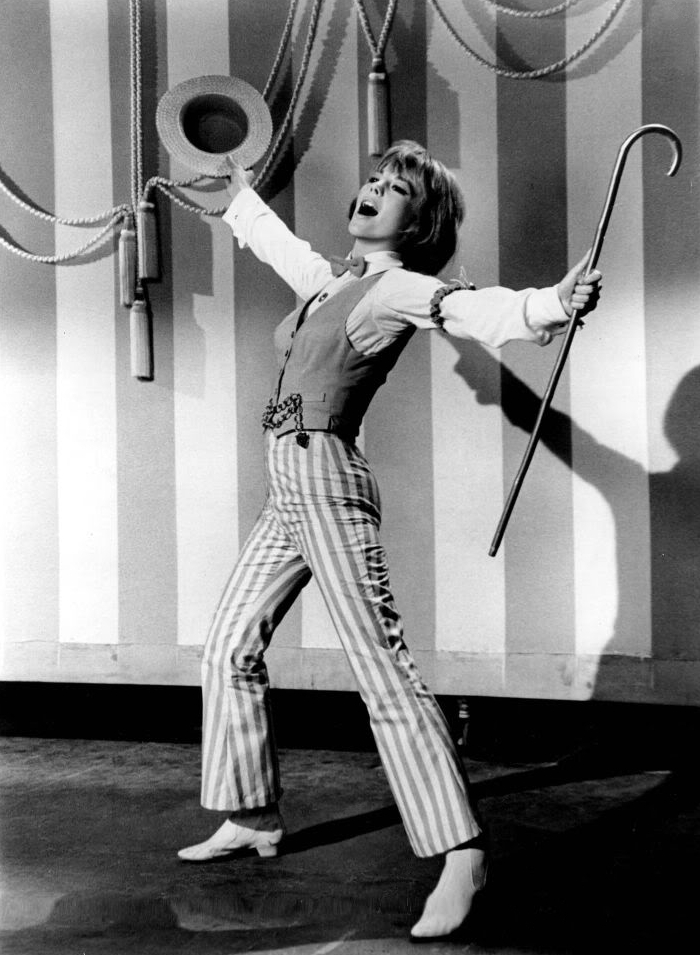
Wood in a publicity photo for Inside Daisy Clover (1965)

Natalie Wood's filmography
Year	Title	Role	Ref(s)
1943	The Moon Is Down	Carrie (Note: Uncredited role)	
1943	Happy Land	Little girl who drops ice cream cone	
1946	Tomorrow Is Forever	Margaret Ludwig	
1946	The Bride Wore Boots	Carol Warren	
1947	The Ghost and Mrs. Muir	Anna Muir (as a child)	
1947	Miracle on 34th Street	Susan Walker	
1947	Driftwood	Jenny Hollingsworth	
1948	Scudda Hoo! Scudda Hay!	Bean McGill	
1948	The Green Promise	Susan Matthews	
1949	Chicken Every Sunday	Ruth Hefferen	
1949	Father Was a Fullback	Ellen Cooper	
1950	No Sad Songs for Me	Polly Scott	
1950	Our Very Own	Penny	
1950	Never a Dull Moment	Nan	
1950	The Jackpot	Phyllis Lawrence	
1951	Dear Brat	Pauline	
1951	The Blue Veil	Stephanie Rawlins	
1952	The Rose Bowl Story	Sally Burke	
1952	Just for You	Barbara Blake	
1952	The Star	Gretchen	
1954	The Silver Chalice	Helena (as a child)	
1955	One Desire	Seely	
1955	Rebel Without a Cause	Judy	
1956	The Searchers	Debbie Edwards	
1956	A Cry in the Night	Liz Taggart	
1956	The Burning Hills	Maria Cristina Colton	
1956	The Girl He Left Behind	Susan Daniels	
1957	Bombers B-52	Lois Brennan	
1958	Marjorie Morningstar	Marjorie	
1958	Kings Go Forth	Monique Blair	
1960	Cash McCall	Lory Austen	
1960	All the Fine Young Cannibals	Sara "Salome" Davis	
1961	Splendor in the Grass	Wilma Dean Loomis	
1961	West Side Story	Maria	
1962	Gypsy	Gypsy Rose Lee	
1963	Love with the Proper Stranger	Angie Rossini	
1964	Sex and the Single Girl	Helen Gurley Brown	
1965	The Great Race	Maggie DuBois	
1965	Inside Daisy Clover	Daisy Clover	
1966	This Property Is Condemned	Alva Starr	
1966	Penelope	Penelope	
1969	Bob & Carol & Ted & Alice	Carol Sanders	
1972	The Candidate	Herself (Note: Cameo)	
1975	Peeper	Ellen Prendergast	
1979	Meteor	Tatiana Donskaya	
1980	The Last Married Couple in America	Mari Thomson	
1980	Willie & Phil	Herself	
1983	Brainstorm	Karen Brace	

== Television ==
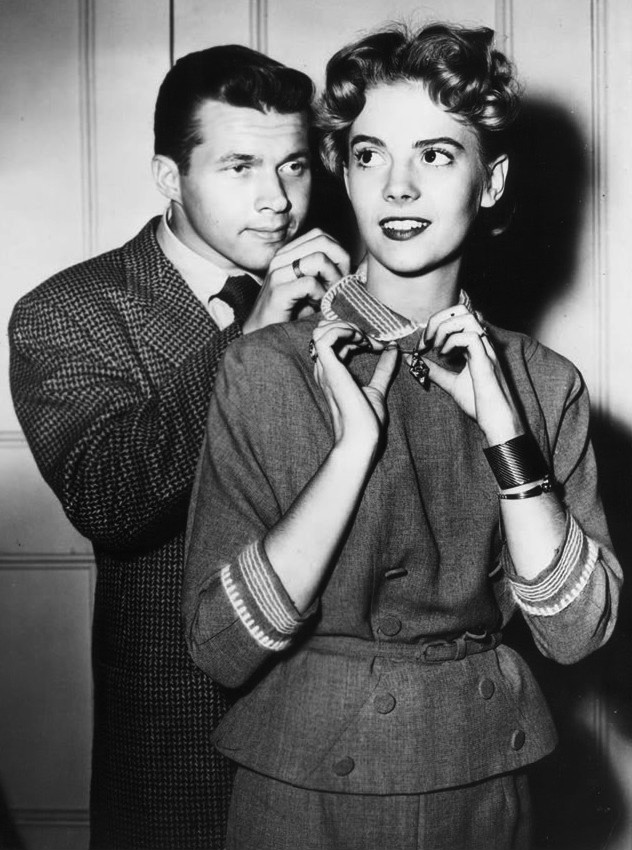
Wood and Tom Bernard in television series The Pride of the Family (1953–1954)

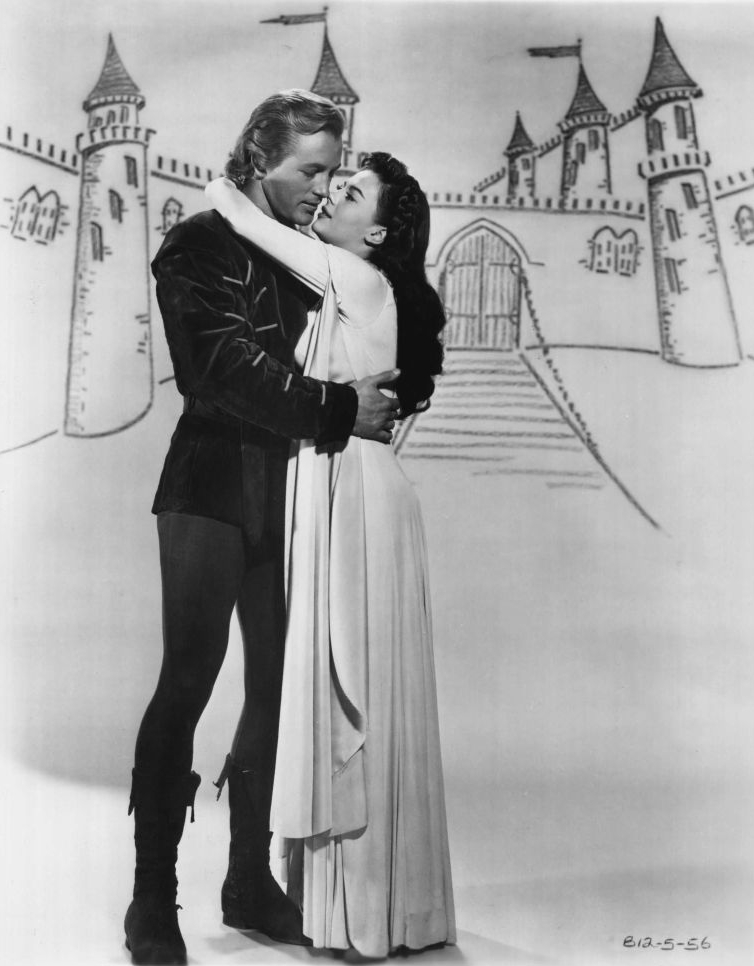
Wood and Jacques Sernas in "The Deadly Riddle" (1956)

Year(s)	Title	Role(s)	Notes	Ref(s)
1952	Chevron Theatre	Monica	Episode: "Playmates"	
1953–1954	The Pride of the Family	Ann Morrison	39 episodes	
1954	The Pepsi-Cola Playhouse	Monica	Episode: "Playmates"	
1954	The Public Defender	Renee Marchand	Episode: "Return of the Dead"	
1954	Studio 57	Sheila Mason	Episode: "The Plot Against Miss Pomeroy"	
1954 1955	General Electric Theater	Lucy / Polly Gookin	Episode: "I'm a Fool"; Episode: "Feathertop"	
1955	Four Star Playhouse	Louise	Episode: "The Wild Bunch"	
1955	Ford Television Theatre	Polly Ramsay	Episode: "Too Old for Dolls"	
1955	Max Liebman Spectaculars	Klara Sesseman	Episode: "Heidi"	
1955	Studio One	Jen Potter	Episode: "Miracle at Potter's Farm"	
1955 1956	Kings Row	Renee Gyllinson	Episode: "Wedding Gift"; Episode: "Carnival"	
1956	Warner Bros. Presents	Lady Marian	Episode: "The Deadly Riddle"	
1956	The Kaiser Aluminum Hour	Kathy Jo	Episode: "Carnival"	
1973	The Affair	Courtney Patterson	ABC Movie of the Week	
1976	Cat on a Hot Tin Roof	Maggie	Television film	
1978	Switch	Girl in the bubble bath	Episode: "The Cage"	
1979	From Here to Eternity	Karen Holmes	Miniseries	
1979	Hart to Hart	Movie Star	Episode: "Pilot"	
1979	The Cracker Factory	Cassie Barrett	Television film	
1980	The Memory of Eva Ryker	Eva / Claire Ryker	Television film	
1981	Peter Ustinov and Natalie Wood at The Hermitage	Herself	Documentary	
