= Brad Renfro =

American actor (1982–2008)

- Renfro in Sleepers (1996)
- Born: Brad Barron Renfro; July 25, 1982; Knoxville, Tennessee, U.S.
- Died: January 15, 2008 (aged 25); Los Angeles, California, U.S.
- Resting place: Red House Cemetery, Grainger County, Tennessee
- Occupation: Actor
- Years active: 1993–2008
- Children: 1

Brad Barron Renfro (July 25, 1982 – January 15, 2008) was an American actor. He made his film debut at age 11 with a starring role in The Client (1994). Renfro went on to appear in 21 feature films, winning several awards.

Prior to being cast in The Client, Renfro had no acting background and was living with his grandmother in a trailer park. Wanting to cast a "tough kid" who had the life experience to understand the character he would portray, director Joel Schumacher chose Renfro to play the role of Mark Sway. Renfro soon attracted a large fanbase, going on to star in The Cure, Tom and Huck, Sleepers, Apt Pupil, Bully and Ghost World.

Beginning in the late 1990s, Renfro experienced difficulties in his private life, including drug addiction and a series of arrests. He died at age 25 of acute heroin and morphine intoxication.

== Early life ==
Renfro was born on July 25, 1982, in Knoxville, Tennessee, the son of Angela Denise Olsen (née McCrory) and Mark Renfro, a factory worker. After his parents divorced, he was raised from the age of five by his paternal grandmother, Joanne Renfro. Renfro did not have a close relationship with his father.

== Career ==
At the age of 10, Renfro was discovered by Mali Finn, a casting director for Joel Schumacher. He was recommended to Finn by retired Knoxville police officer and local DARE program representative Dennis Bowman, who was captivated by Renfro's charm and street smarts. Renfro was cast by Finn in the lead role of Mark Sway in Joel Schumacher's film The Client because the author of the novel on which it was based, John Grisham, required that an established child actor not be cast and that an unknown from Tennessee be cast for the role. Renfro had no prior acting experience or training at the time. Finn had contacted various agencies that worked with youth; she wanted to cast a "tough" kid and settled on Renfro after looking at 5,000 such boys all over the United States. At the time, Renfro had been living in a trailer park outside Knoxville with his grandmother. "I wanted a kid who understood in the marrow of his psyche what it was like to grow up too soon," Schumacher later told The New York Times.

Renfro's casting was announced in May 1993, and The Client was filmed in the summer of that year. The Client became one of the top-grossing films of 1994. In 1995, Renfro won The Hollywood Reporter's "Young Star" award, and in 1996 was nominated as one of People magazine's "30 Under 30" list.

Renfro played Huckleberry Finn in 1995's Tom and Huck. He also won a second "Young Star" award, as well as a "Young Artist" award, for his performance in The Cure.

In 1996, Renfro appeared in Sleepers, which was based on the novel by Lorenzo Carcaterra. The film was directed by Barry Levinson and Renfro played the younger version of co-star Brad Pitt's character. The following year, Renfro starred in Telling Lies in America, directed by Guy Ferland.

In 1998, he starred in Apt Pupil, directed by Bryan Singer, for which he won the Best Actor award at Tokyo International Film Festival and was also nominated for a Saturn Award. The several films Renfro starred in that followed gained little attention, with the majority going straight to video. He played Leon S. Kennedy in a live-action ad for Resident Evil 2 directed by George A. Romero, which aired in Japan. He went on to act in other films, including 2001's Ghost World, Bully, Happy Campers, Tart; 2002's American Girl; and 2005's The Jacket. He also appeared in the 2006 Law & Order: Criminal Intent episode "Watch" and completed filming on the film The Informers.

Renfro appeared in the first version of the music video for the 10 Years song "Wasteland"; his cousin, Jesse Hasek, is the band's lead singer. He was also featured in the video for the N.E.R.D song "Provider", playing the part of a petty drug dealer.

== Personal life ==
Renfro had a son who was born in Japan in 2003 and was raised there by his mother, a Japanese citizen.

=== Substance abuse and criminal record ===
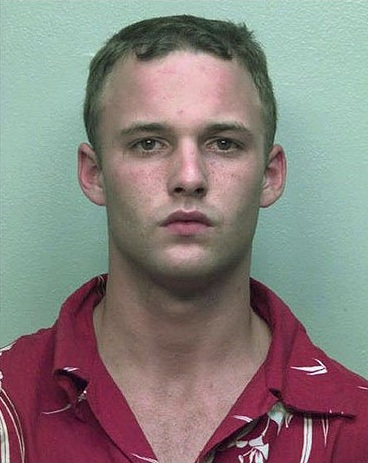
2000 mug shot

On June 3, 1998, Renfro, then 15, and his 19-year-old cousin were arrested near Knoxville and charged with drug possession. Renfro was carrying two small bags of cocaine in a cigarette box and a bag of marijuana in his sock. He entered into a plea bargain in which he agreed to random drug tests.

By the age of 18, Renfro had already been in drug rehabilitation more than once. On August 28, 2000, he and a friend attempted to steal a yacht from the Fort Lauderdale harbor. Renfro was charged with grand theft and criminal mischief; in January 2001, he was sentenced to two years' probation and ordered to pay investigative costs and yacht repair costs. By this time, his encounters with the law had given him a complicated reputation; while still seen as a teenage idol, he was also known for his drug abuse.

Renfro violated his probation in May 2001 when he was arrested for underage drinking. On January 14, 2002, he violated his probation again and was arrested on charges of public intoxication and driving without a valid license in Knoxville. He was placed into a three-month substance abuse treatment program as a result.

On November 24, 2005, Renfro was arrested in Los Angeles and charged with a misdemeanor count of driving under the influence and two counts of driving with a suspended license, leading to 10 days in jail and 18 months of alcohol education classes. He was arrested by LAPD officers on December 22, 2005, during an undercover drug sweep of Skid Row. Following that arrest, he was charged with attempted possession of heroin. A photograph showing him in handcuffs made the front page of the Los Angeles Times. Renfro admitted to a detective that he was using heroin and methadone. He pleaded guilty, was sentenced to three years' probation, and was fined $450. In May 2006, he spent 10 days in jail for driving while under the influence and attempted heroin possession.

In June 2007, Renfro was found to have violated his probation by failing to enroll in a long-term drug treatment program. A judge warned him that if he violated probation twice more he could be sentenced to a live-in rehabilitation program or to jail.

Following Renfro's death in January 2008, his cousin Jesse Hasek stated that Renfro and his son had visited him several days earlier and that Renfro had made positive changes in his life. According to Hasek, "He had hit rock bottom and had come way back up."

== Death ==
Renfro was found dead at age 25 on January 15, 2008, in his Los Angeles apartment. His body was returned to Tennessee with services held at Stevens Mortuary in North Knoxville on January 21, 2008. Renfro was buried on the same day at Red House Cemetery in Grainger County, Tennessee, near the city of Blaine. On February 8, 2008, the Los Angeles County Coroner's office ruled his death accidental, attributing it to acute heroin/morphine intoxication.

On February 1, 2008, 17 days after Renfro's death, his grandmother Joanne Renfro—who had accompanied him regularly during his early acting career—died at her home at the age of 76. Local officials stated that she died of natural causes.

== Legacy ==
Renfro was omitted from the "In Memoriam" tribute montage at the 80th Academy Awards in the year following his death. Perceived by the press as a "snub", his omission from the Oscars received widespread media coverage.

Renfro's roommate, Mark Foster of Foster the People, wrote a song about his death called "Downtown". The song was included on a deluxe edition of the band's 2011 debut album Torches.

In 2012, the art magazine The Thing Quarterly reported that actor James Franco had the name "Brad" tattooed on his right shoulder in memory of Renfro. Franco also produced a limited-edition series of switchblades bearing the words "Brad Renfro" and "Forever."

In 2018, 10 years after Renfro's death, and again the following year, the website BuzzFeed devoted a long article to recounting his rise and descent. The article discussed whether the film industry adequately protects the welfare of at-risk child actors. BuzzFeed found no evidence that laws or contractual provisions had been violated on Renfro's films, but suggested that the industry had failed the actor by not ensuring that he was appropriately supervised when he was off the movie set.

During Renfro's early career, his worldliness and self-confidence caused many adults who came into contact with him to believe that he was some years older than his actual age. Gemma Jackson, production designer on Tom and Huck, remembered Renfro as being 15 or 16 years of age during filming when he was actually 13. Jackson recounted to BuzzFeed that during production, Renfro had a girlfriend who was several years his senior. He developed an ardent following among adolescent girls; Peter Horton, director of The Cure, recalled that Renfro—who had just turned 12—received cards from girls in Stillwater, Minnesota, that contained sexually suggestive messages.

Renfro's apparent maturity was reflected in his onscreen portrayals. In his early roles, he was often sexualized and shown shirtless. In Apt Pupil, Renfro was shown showering. He also performed scenes with sexual and violent content.

== Filmography ==
=== Film ===
Year	Title	Role	Notes	Ref.
1994	The Client	Mark Sway		
1995	The Cure	Erik		
1995	Tom and Huck	Huckleberry Finn		
1996	Sleepers	Young Michael Sullivan		
1997	Telling Lies in America	Karchy "Chucky" Jonas		
1998	Apt Pupil	Todd Bowden		
1999	2 Little, 2 Late	Jimmy Walsh		
1999	Meter Man	Sal		
2000	Herschel Hopper: New York Rabbit	Tanner		
2000	Skipped Parts	Dothan Talbot		
2001	Bully	Marty Puccio	Also associate producer	
2001	Ghost World	Josh		
2001	Happy Campers	Wichita		
2001	Tart	William Sellers		
2001	The Theory of the Leisure Class	Billy		
2002	American Girl	Jay Grubb		
2002	Deuces Wild	Bobby		
2003	Citizen Tony	Thoren (voice)	Television film	
2003	The Job	Troy Riverside		
2004	Mummy an' the Armadillo	Wyatte	Also known as The Scare Hole	
2005	Hollywood Flies	Jamie		
2005	The Jacket	The Stranger		
2006	10th and Wolf	Vincent		
2008	Collector	Justin		
2008	The Informers	Jack	Posthumous release; final role; dedicated in memory	
2010	Never Sleep Again: The Elm Street Legacy	Himself	Archive footage	
2025	George A. Romero's Resident Evil	Himself	Archive footage	

=== Television ===
Year	Title	Role	Notes	Ref.
2000	Recess	(Voice)	Episode: "Germ Warfare"	
2000	Teacher's Pet	Miles (voice)	Episode: “Movin' on Pup/Escaping Dog Trick”	
2006	Law & Order: Criminal Intent	Duane Winslow	Episode: "Watch"	

=== Music videos ===
Year	Artist	Title	Ref.
1998	The Rolling Stones	"Gimme Shelter"	
2002	N.E.R.D	"Provider"	
2005	10 Years	"Wasteland'"	

== Awards and nominations ==
Year	Award	Category	Work	Results	Ref.
1995	Chicago Film Critics Association	Most Promising Actor	The Client	Nominated	
1995	YoungStar Awards	Best Performance by a Young Actor in a Drama Film	The Client	Won	
1995	Young Artist Awards	Best Performance by a Young Actor Starring in a Motion Picture	The Client	Won	
1996	YoungStar Awards	Best Performance by a Young Actor in a Comedy Film	Tom and Huck	Nominated	
1996	Young Artist Awards	Young Artist Award for Best Young Leading Actor in a Feature Film (shared with Joseph Mazzello)	The Cure	Nominated	
1997	YoungStar Awards	Best Performance by a Young Actor in a Drama Film	Sleepers	Nominated	
1998	Tokyo International Film Festival	Best Actor Award	Apt Pupil	Won	
1999	Academy of Science Fiction, Fantasy & Horror Films	Saturn Award for Best Performance by a Younger Actor	Apt Pupil	Nominated	
2001	New York International Independent Film Festival	Best Actor	The Theory of the Leisure Class	Won	
2004	Sedona International Film Festival	Director's Choice Award for Most Spirited Rising Performer	—	Won	
2004	Breckenridge Festival of Film	Best Ensemble Cast	Mummy an' the Armadillo	Won	
2008	Action On Film International Film Festival	Best Actor – Short	Collector	Won	

== See also ==
- List of people from Knoxville, Tennessee
- List of American former child actors
