= 17th Youth in Film Awards =

1996 US media awards ceremony

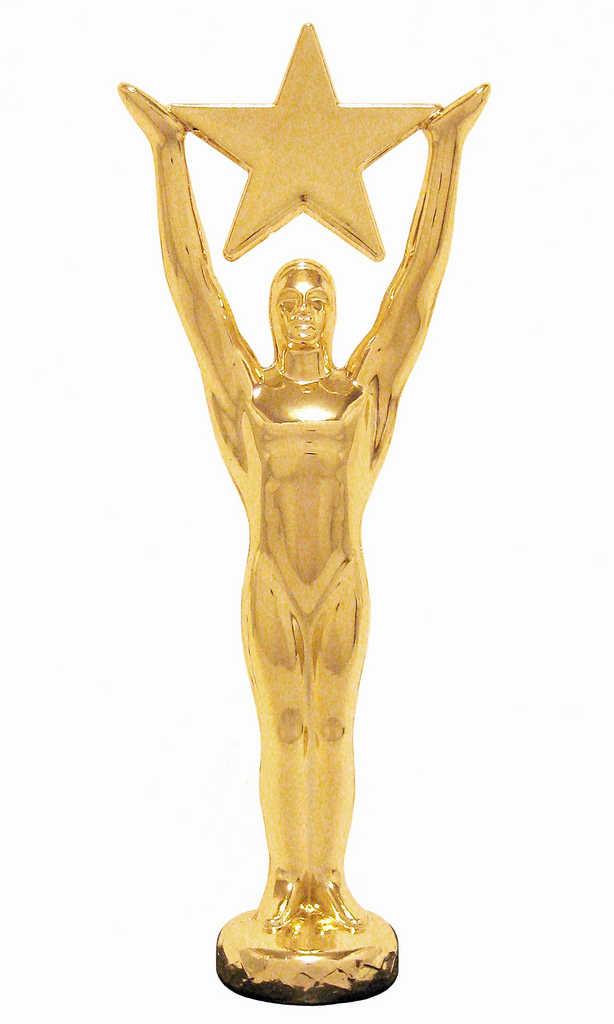
- Awarded for: Achievement in the 1994—1995 season
- Date: 1996
- Site: Hollywood, California
- Hosted by: Jennifer Love Hewitt

The 17th Youth in Film Awards ceremony (now known as the Young Artist Awards), presented by the Youth in Film Association, honored outstanding youth performers under the age of 21 in the fields of film, television and music for the 1994–1995 season, and took place in 1996 in Hollywood, California.

Established organization to establish an awards ceremony specifically set to recognize and award the contributions of performers under the age of 21 in the fields of film, television, theater and music.

== Categories ==
★ Bold indicates the winner in each category.

== Best Young Performer in a Feature Film ==
=== Best Young Leading Actor: Feature Film ===
★ Wil Horneff – Born to Be Wild

- Jerry Barone – Two Bits
- Jesse Bradford – Far From Home: The Adventures of Yellow Dog
- Brad Renfro & Joseph Mazzello – The Cure
- Hal Scardino – The Indian in the Cupboard
- Ryan Slater – The Amazing Panda Adventure
- Jonathan Taylor Thomas – Tom and Huck
- Leonardo DiCaprio - The Basketball Diaries

=== Best Young Leading Actress: Feature Film ===
★ Anna Chlumsky – Gold Diggers: The Secret of Bear Mountain

- Vanessa Lee Chester – A Little Princess
- Liesel Matthews – A Little Princess
- Christina Ricci – Casper
- Claire Danes – Home for the Holidays
- Kirsten Dunst – Jumanji
- Nicole Lund – Grizzly Mountain
- Alicia Silverstone – Clueless

=== Best Young Supporting Actor: Feature Film ===
★ Jonathan Hernandez – My Family

- Joseph Anderson – Mr. Holland's Opus
- Steve Cardenas – Mighty Morphin Power Rangers: The Movie
- Rishi Bhat – The Indian in the Cupboard
- Thomas Ian Nicholas – A Kid in King Arthur's Court

=== Best Young Supporting Actress: Feature Film ===
★ Kristy Young – Gordy

- Stacey Dash – Clueless
- Julia Devin – The Tie That Binds
- Brittany Murphy – Clueless
- Jean Marie Barnwell – Born to Be Wild
- Natalie Portman – Heat
- Sarah Wayne – Magic in the Water
- Yi Ding – The Amazing Panda Adventure

=== Best Performance by a Young Actor Under 10: Feature Film ===
★ Nicholas John Renner – Mr. Holland's Opus

- Jimmy Baker – Man of the House
- Dylan Haggerty – Grizzly Mountain
- Joshua Haines – Three Wishes
- Joel Palmer – Far From Home: The Adventures of Yellow Dog
- Andy Ryan – Paul McCall

=== Best Performance by a Young Actress Under 10: Feature Film ===
★ Scarlett Pomers – The Baby-Sitters Club

- Courtney Chase – Roommates
- Bethany Richards – Angus
- Ashley Olsen – It Takes Two
- Mary-Kate Olsen – It Takes Two

== Best Young Performer in a TV Special ==
=== Best Performance by a Young Actor: TV Special ===
★ Mike McCarthy – Deadly Whispers

- Robert Bishop – Family of Cops
- Geoffrey Scott Brown – Fast Forward
- Toran Caudell – Max Is Missing
- Noah Fleiss – A Mother's Prayer
- Victor Rajas – Max is Missing
- Shane Sweet – Indictment: The McMartin Trial

=== Best Performance by a Young Actress: TV Special ===
★ Sandee Van Dyke – The Judds

- Kyndra Joy Casper – The Great Mom Swap
- Robin Lynn Heath – The Stranger
- Ashley Johnson – Annie: A Royal Adventure!
- Laura Morgan – Love Can Build a Bridge

== Best Young Performer in a TV Series ==
=== Best Performance by a Young Actor: TV Drama Series ===
★ Shawn Toovey – Dr. Quinn, Medicine Woman

- Steven Hartman – The Bold and the Beautiful
- Jonathan Jackson – General Hospital
- Cirroc Lofton – Star Trek: Deep Space Nine
- Chaz Ryan – Days of Our Lives
- Kyle Sabihy – The Bold and the Beautiful
- Micheal Sullivan – Days of Our Lives
- Billy Tolson – Walker, Texas Ranger

=== Best Performance by a Young Actress: TV Drama Series ===
★ Jessica Bowman – Dr. Quinn, Medicine Woman

- Lacey Chabert – Party of Five
- Yvonne Zima – ER
- Erin Torpey – One Life to Live
- Heather Tom – The Young and the Restless
- Maitland Ward – The Young and the Restless
- Courtney Peldon – Renegade

=== Best Performance by a Young Actor: TV Comedy Series ===
★ Benjamin Salisbury – The Nanny

- Christopher Castile – Step by Step
- Zane Carney – Dave's World
- Will Estes – Kirk
- Frankie J. Galasso – Hudson Street
- Sam Gifaldi – Bless This House
- Richard Lee Jackson – Saved by the Bell: The New Class
- Matthew Lawrence – Brotherly Love
- Nick Scoullar – The Anti-Gravity Room
- Phillip Van Dyke – The Home Court
- Jake Richardson – Fudge
- Bobby E. McAdams II – Minor Adjustments

=== Best Performance by a Young Actress: TV Comedy Series ===
★ Nassira Nicola – Fudge

- Danielle Fishel – Boy Meets World
- Meghann Haldeman – The Home Court
- Ashley Johnson – Maybe This Time
- Sarah Lancaster – Saved by the Bell: The New Class
- Tia & Tamera Mowry – Sister, Sister
- Nicholle Tom – The Nanny
- Madeline Zima – The Nanny
- Lisa Rieffel – Women of the House
- Maia Campbell – In the House
- Natanya Ross – The Secret World of Alex Mack

=== Best Performance by a Young Actor: Guest Starring Role TV Series ===
★ Justin Thomson – Boy Meets World

- Anthony Jesse Cruz – Baywatch
- John Graas – Dr. Quinn, Medicine Woman
- Richard Lee Jackson – Star Trek: Deep Space Nine
- Lucky Luciano – The Tonight Show
- Chris J. Miller – Maybe This Time

=== Best Performance by a Young Actress: Guest Starring Role TV Series ===
★ Kim Cullum – Home Improvement

- Kyndra Joy Casper – NYPD Blue
- Erin J. Dean – Boy Meets World
- Yunoka Doyle – Touched by an Angel
- Lisa Rieffel – Brotherly Love
- Krista Sherre Selico – Sister, Sister
- Sabrina Wiener – Charlie Grace
- Lisa Wilhoit – Walker, Texas Ranger

=== Best Performance by a Young Actor Under 10: Television ===
★ Ross Bagley – The Fresh Prince of Bel-Air

- Spencer Treat Clark – Another World
- Andrew Ducote – Dave's World
- Andy Lawrence – Brotherly Love
- Jacob Loyst – Sisters
- Courtland Mead – Kirk
- Haley Joel Osment – The Jeff Foxworthy Show
- Jeffery Wood – In the House

=== Best Performance by a Young Actress Under 10: Television ===
★ Kaitlin Cullum – Grace Under Fire

- Brittany Holmes – Ellen
- Kylie Erica Mar – The Parent 'Hood
- Camille Winbush – Minor Adjustments
- Danielle Wiener – Diagnosis: Murder

== Best Young Performer in a Voiceover Role ==
=== Best Performance by a Young Actor: Voiceover Role ===
★ Malachi Pearson – Casper

- Josh Keaton – Todd Lincoln
- Chris Allport – The Donna Reed Show
- Roland Thomson – The Revolutionary War

=== Best Performance by a Young Actress: Voiceover Role ===
★ Sarah Freeman – Toy Story

- Rachel Miner – Orphan Train
- Danielle Wiener – This Is America, Charlie Brown
- Sabrina Wiener – Santo Bugito

== Best Young Ensemble Performance ==
=== Best Performances by a Young Ensemble: Feature Film or Video ===
★ The Baby-Sitters Club – Columbia Pictures/TriStar Pictures

- Now and Then – New Line Cinema
- Secret Adventures: Slam and Split – Taweel-Loos and Company
- The Brady Bunch Movie – Paramount Pictures

=== Best Performance by a Young Ensemble: Television ===
★ The Secret World of Alex Mack – Nickelodeon

- The Home Court – NBC
- Sweet Valley High – Saban
- Fudge – ABC
- Are You Afraid of the Dark? – Nickelodeon

== Best Young Entertainer: Acting and Singing ==
=== Best Professional Actress/Singer ===
★ Moriah Snyder

- Brittany Murphy
- Ivyann Schwan
- Jennifer Love Hewitt

=== Best Professional Actor/Singer ===
★ Chris Allport

- Frankie J. Galasso
- Josh Keaton
- Zachary McLemore

== Best Family Entertainment ==
=== Best Family Animation Production ===
★ Animaniacs – Warner Brothers

- The Adventures of Dudley the Dragon – Canadian TV
- Doug – Nickelodeon
- Siegfried and Roy – DIC
- This Is America, Charlie Brown – Lee Mendelson

=== Best Family Feature: Action-Adventure ===
★ Jumanji – TriStar

- The Amazing Panda Adventure – Warner Brothers
- Far from Home: The Adventures of Yellow Dog – 20th Century Fox
- Magic in the Water – Columbia-TriStar
- Gold Diggers: The Secret of Bear Mountain – Universal
- Grizzly Mountain – Hemdale

=== Best Family Feature: Musical or Comedy ===
★ Toy Story – Walt Disney

- Babe – Universal
- Balto – Universal
- Casper – Universal
- Clueless – Paramount
- Pocahontas – Walt Disney

=== Best Family Feature: Drama ===
★ Mr. Holland's Opus – Walt Disney

- Apollo 13 – Universal
- The Cure – Universal
- The Indian in the Cupboard – Paramount
- A Little Princess – Warner Brothers
- Two Bits – Miramax

== Youth In Film's Special Awards ==
=== The Jackie Coogan Award ===
==== Outstanding Contribution to Youth Through Motion Pictures ====
★ Christopher Reeve – For his Inspiration to Youth

=== The Michael Landon Award ===
==== Outstanding Contribution to Youth Through Television ====
★ Dr. Quinn, Medicine Woman – For Outstanding Family Television Series of the Year
Beth Sullivan – Executive Producer; Timothy Johnson – Producer; Chad Allen, Jessica Bowman, Shawn Toovey – Young Stars of the Series

=== Outstanding Contribution To Youth Through Entertainment ===
★ World Youth News – Kris Kollins and Mick Kollins

=== Community Service Award ===
★ Special Olympics World Games 1995 – Kids TV – New Haven, Connecticut
