= Desperate Choices: To Save My Child =

- Genre: Drama
- Written by: Sandra Jennings; Maggie Kleinman
- Directed by: Andy Tennant
- Starring: Joanna Kerns
- Music by: John M. Keane
- Country of origin: United States
- Original language: English

Production
- Executive producer: Andrew Adelson
- Cinematography: Peter Stein
- Editor: Debra Neil-Fisher (as Debra Neil)
- Running time: 100 mins.
- Production companies: ABC Productions (in association with); Andrew Adelson Company; Empty Chair Productions Inc.

Original release
- Network: NBC
- Release: October 5, 1992

Desperate Choices: To Save My Child is a 1992 television film directed by Andy Tennant. It stars Joanna Kerns and Bruce Davison. It was nominated for two Young Artist Awards in 1992. Desperate Choices: To Save My Child premiered on NBC on October 5, 1992. The film was retitled Solomon's Choice for home video and rebroadcast.

== Cast ==
- Joanna Kerns as Mel Robbins
- Bruce Davison as Richard Robbins
- Joseph Mazzello as Willy Robbins
- Jeremy Sisto as Josh Ryan
- Bruce McGill as Dan Ryan
- Reese Witherspoon as Cassie Robbins
- William Newman as Dr. Edwards
- Steven Gilborn as Dr. Andrews
- Rondi Reed as Dr. Brunell
