= The Amazing Panda Adventure =

- Theatrical release poster
- Directed by: Christopher Cain
- Screenplay by: Jeff Rothberg; Laurice Elehwany
- Story by: John Wilcox; Steven Alldredge
- Produced by: Lee Rich; John Wilcox; Gary Foster; Dylan Sellers
- Starring: Stephen Lang; Yi Ding; Ryan Slater
- Cinematography: Jack N. Green
- Edited by: Jack Hofstra
- Music by: William Ross
- Production companies: Gary Foster Productions; Lee Rich Productions; Warner Bros.
- Distributed by: Warner Bros.
- Release date: August 25, 1995 (United States)
- Running time: 84 minutes
- Countries: United States; China
- Languages: English; Chinese
- Box office: $7.5 million

The Amazing Panda Adventure is a 1995 American adventure film directed by Christopher Cain and starring Stephen Lang. It follows a 10-year-old American boy, played by Ryan Slater, who travels to China and has to take a panda cub to the reserve so it can reunite with its mother. The film was produced and distributed by Warner Bros. under their Family Entertainment label on August 25, 1995, and was preceded by the Looney Tunes short Carrotblanca in theaters.

== Plot ==
Panda rescuer Michael Tyler sends his son Ryan in America a plane ticket so that he can visit him in China, where he works with pandas. Ryan is not sure he wants to go, but his mother says he can just come back if he doesn't like it. In China, Michael and his two companions, Ling, a young girl and champion translator, and Chu, Ling's grandfather who is very experienced with giant pandas track down a mother panda and place a radio collar on her while her cub watches nearby. After they leave, she steps into a trap. Back at the reserve, Michael and the staff recognize from the radio signal that the panda is in danger. Just as Michael, Ling and Chu set out to visit the panda, Ryan arrives at the reserve. After some argument, Michael lets him come.

The poachers who set up the trap, Shong and Po, take the panda's cub and shoot Michael when he tries to intervene. Michael and the mother panda are returned to the reserve by helicopter, and Ling, Chu, and Ryan look for the poachers. They eventually discover their hideout near a waterfall, and free the panda cub before Chu, Ryan and Ling travel back to wait for the helicopter to arrive.

The poachers, upon discovering the cub is missing, shoot the bridge that Ryan and Ling are crossing, and the two of them and the panda cub are washed downstream, but manage to resurface further downriver. The two try to power the radio collar to alert the reserve of their location, but Ryan carelessly springs the battery into the water. They decide to move on and locate the Four Sisters mountain. After a while of venturing, Ryan tries to leave the cub in the forest, deciding that bringing it back to the reserve would result in him not seeing his father for further years, but afterwards relents, deciding that his actions would be a mistake. Ryan, Ling and the cub accidentally get washed downstream again; upon resurfacing, the pair realize that they are covered in leeches and are forced to remove all their clothing and wash themselves off in the lake. Ryan realizes that he can use the battery in his watch to power the radio collar and enable his father to locate them.

Attempting to make their way back to the reserve with the cub, they come upon a local Tibetan village that grants them hospitality for protecting the cub, with Ryan and Ling naming the cub "Johnny" after Ryan's friend back home in America. Johnny starts to become weaker and Ryan and Ling discover needs his mother's milk or else he won't survive, so they plan to leave the next day to get back to the reserve via the Four Sisters. However, Shong and Po also arrive the next day. The villagers help the trio escape the village. Upon finally reaching the Four Sisters, Ryan, Ling and Johnny climb the peaks, unaware of Po and Shong following them close behind. Ryan discovers that the trail is a dead end and they can go no further, Po and Shong catch up to them and they stage a fight. Michael arrives and subdues the poachers, and he, Chu, Ryan, Ling, Johnny with Po and Shong tied up, drive back to the reserve. The Chinese committee officials who were going to close the reserve see Ryan returning Johnny, who reunites with its mother and decide to let it remain open. Michael finally reflects over him not spending any time with Ryan and decide that they and Ling can do something big together later on, with the ending scene showing an older Johnny energetically running through a field a while later.

== Cast ==
- Stephen Lang as Dr. Michael Tyler
- Ryan Slater as Ryan Tyler
- Yi Ding as Ling
- Wang Fei as Grandfather Chu
- Zhou Jian Zhong as Po
- Yao Er Ga as Shong
- Isabella Hofmann as Beth Tyler
- Brian Wagner as Johnny

== Reception ==
On review aggregator website Rotten Tomatoes, the film holds an approval rating of 30% based on 11 reviews, and an average rating of 4.5/10.

Yi Ding was nominated for Best Young Supporting Actress in the 17th Youth in Film Awards for her performance as 'Ling' in the film.

== See also ==
- Penny Ling from Littlest Pet Shop.
- Born in China
