= Undrafted (film) =

2016 film directed by Joseph Mazzello

- Theatrical release poster
- Directed by: Joseph Mazzello
- Written by: Joseph Mazzello
- Produced by: Joseph Mazzello; Eric Fischer; Brianna Johnson
- Starring: Joseph Mazzello; Aaron Tveit; Tyler Hoechlin; Chace Crawford; Philip Winchester
- Cinematography: Adrian Correia
- Edited by: Sharon Rutter
- Production companies: Dead Fish Films; Parlay Pictures
- Distributed by: Vertical Entertainment
- Release date: July 15, 2016 (United States)
- Running time: 100 minutes
- Country: United States
- Language: English
- Box office: $5,777

Undrafted is a 2016 sports comedy-drama film. It is the directorial debut of Joseph Mazzello, who also wrote, co-produced and starred in the film. It also stars Aaron Tveit, Tyler Hoechlin, Chace Crawford and Philip Winchester. It is based on the true story of Mazzello's brother who missed out on the Major League Baseball draft. The film was released on July 15, 2016, by Vertical Entertainment.

The film was executive produced by Tony Romo, who was an undrafted free agent before being signed by the Dallas Cowboys of the National Football League.

== Plot ==
A summer league baseball team called the DBs (for Diamondbacks) is in the league semifinals. Maz, one of their players, decides to play despite the disappointment of finding out minutes earlier he was not drafted. The opposing team, the Bulldogs, have ringers so the DBs will have to play extra hard to win. The DBs manage to keep the Bulldogs from scoring until the final inning. Pitcher Dells loses his confidence and gives up several runs. The DBs must play perfectly in their final inning, and by some miracle, Maz becomes the hero of the game.

== Cast ==
- Joseph Mazzello as Pat Murray
- Aaron Tveit as John "Maz" Mazzello
- Tyler Hoechlin as Jonathan "Dells" Dellamonica
- Chace Crawford as Arthur Barone
- Philip Winchester as Fotch
- Jim Belushi as Joey
- Manny Montana as Zapata
- Matt Bush as David Stein
- Michael Fishman as Antonelli
- Duke Davis Roberts as Ty Dellamonica
- Matt Barr as Anthony
- Billy Gardell as Umpire Haze
- Ryan Pinkston as Jonathan Garvey
- Toby Hemingway as Palacco
- Jay Hayden as Vinnie
- David Del Rio as Tree
- Michael Consiglio as Dave Schwartz
- Justin Matthew Gallegos as Baseball Player
- Rick Iwasaki as a Baseball Player
- Zachary Scott Green as a Baseball Player

== Production ==
=== Pre-production ===
Mazzello wrote the screenplay based on events in his brother's life. "I watched for 15 years as my brother worked tirelessly to make his dream come true only to see it never happen and it was heartbreaking [...] During that time I saw the love he and his teammates had for each other and for the game; that is the heart of our story."

=== Filming ===
Principal photography took place in Dunsmore Park, La Crescenta-Montrose, California from September 2013 to October 8, 2013.

== Release ==
On June 2, 2014, Mazzello announced via Twitter that he had "finally finished editing my film". In February 2016, Vertical Entertainment acquired worldwide distribution rights to the film. The film was scheduled to be released on July 15, 2016.

=== Marketing ===
The first official poster was released on Mazzello's Twitter on February 17, 2015.

=== Reception ===
On Rotten Tomatoes, the film has a score of 14%, based on 7 reviews, with an average rating of 4.3/10. On Metacritic, there are three "unfavorable" reviews out of three, and the average rating is 31/100. Writing in the Hollywood Reporter, Frank Scheck stated "Undrafted never manages to make us care about its overgrown adolescent characters and whether or not they win the game. It’s a fatal flaw in a sports movie, even if several of the young actors demonstrate real athletic skills. Film critic Brian Orndorf described the movie as "an itchy valentine to the world of intramural baseball". Nivk Schager also panned the film in The Village Voice, writing "there’s no escaping the fact that the dugout-and-diamond shenanigans are consistently tedious." Steve Green wrote in Indiewire, " "Undrafted” tries to make a ragtag baseball team from a bevy of players with quirks dialed up so high they overwhelm every other aspect of the film," and concludes, "this is standard-issue sports fare that still seems intent on grafting unnecessary piles of story on top. Todd Jorgenson's review stated, "The errors outnumber the hits in this heartfelt ensemble drama," stating that the film was sunk by "an off-putting collection of characters who become tiresome, both on and off the field. Critic Frank Swietek wrote, "despite the best efforts of a game cast, the movie definitely comes across as a bush-league effort."

Michael Rechtshaffen gave Undrafted a mixed review in the Los Angeles Times, calling the film "an amiable if aimless ensemble comedy that's unable to overcome its amateur status...the greatest challenge being faced turns out to be not knowing what story to tell."

== See also ==
- List of baseball films
