= The Client (novel) =

1993 novel by John Grisham

- Author: John Grisham
- Publication date: 1993

The Client is a 1993 legal thriller novel written by American author John Grisham. It is set mostly in Memphis, Tennessee, and New Orleans, Louisiana. It is Grisham's fourth novel.

The titular client of the book is Mark Sway, an 11-year old who learns a secret that places him at the center of a conspiracy that crosses between politics, a corporation, and the mob. The novel was quite popular, spending over 40 weeks on The New York Times bestseller list.

== Plot ==
Boyd Boyette, a United States senator from Louisiana, goes missing. Because of his vocal opposition to a proposed major toxic landfill project by a company known to be Mafia-backed, murder is suspected. But no body can be found and Roy Foltrigg, United States Attorney in New Orleans, is desperate for a suspect. Barry "The Blade" Muldanno, a well-known thug and nephew of Johnny Sulari, acting boss of the New Orleans crime family is suspected. The FBI monitors Muldanno, hoping he'll lead them to the body.

Eleven-year-old Mark Sway, his younger brother Ricky, and their divorced mother Dianne live in a trailer park in Memphis. Mark and Ricky are smoking cigarettes in the woods near their home, when they encounter a man trying to commit suicide by piping exhaust fumes into his car. Trying to remove the hose, Mark is grabbed by the man and forced into the car. The man, under the influence of drugs and alcohol, reveals himself to be lawyer Jerome Clifford. Clifford tells Mark that he is about to kill himself to avoid being murdered by Muldanno, who has revealed to him the location of Boyette's body. Mark manages to escape, and Clifford then shoots himself.

Ricky becomes catatonic after witnessing the suicide and is hospitalized. Authorities—and the Mob—suspect that Clifford may have told Mark where the body is.

At the hospital, the FBI urgently want to talk to Mark. Street-smart beyond his years, he realizes that he will need a lawyer. By coincidence, he meets Regina "Reggie" Love, a lawyer specializing in child abuse cases, who agrees to represent him for a token retainer of one dollar. Reggie suspects that Mark has not told her the complete story, including the location of the body.

Two Mafia operatives, Bono and Pirini, are dispatched from New Orleans to Memphis to see what Mark knows; they hire local "security specialists," Nance and Sisson, to snoop at the hospital. Reggie represents Mark in an interview with the FBI, knowing that she does not have the full story. Roaming the hospital, Mark is cornered and threatened by Nance that he'll kill him if he talks.

Foltrigg, a glory-seeking lawyer with political aspirations, known as "Reverend Roy" because of his penchant for preaching to juries, arrives at the offices of George Ord, the United States attorney in Memphis, where he is less than welcome. Foltrigg and his staff plot methods to get Mark to reveal where the body is hidden, and also plot to get Reggie into court, hoping to pierce attorney-client confidentiality, assuming that Reggie actually knows the location of the body.

The FBI apply to Harry Roosevelt, a judge of the Juvenile Court, to arrange Mark's detention for his own protection. This is reluctantly approved by Roosevelt and Mark is arrested in the hospital room where Ricky is recovering.

Mark and Reggie appear before the judge, but, scared out of his wits, Mark "takes the Fifth" and refuses to reveal what he knows. He is returned to detention, and after faking a medical condition, is taken to the hospital, from which he escapes, eventually taking refuge with Reggie. The Sway family trailer is burned to the ground by Bono and Pirini; the family now have no home and little else.

Dianne loses her job in a minimum-wage sweatshop, but Reggie threatens the company president with a lawsuit, on condition that they keep sending her paycheck and fresh flowers to the hospital.

K. O. Lewis, Deputy Director of the FBI, is drawn into the case. He proposes a deal—if Mark reveals the location of the body, they will place the Sway family in the witness protection program.

Reggie and Mark drive to Clifford's house at the same time as Muldanno's accomplices. They start to dig up the body, which is buried under concrete in Clifford's boat shed, but a melee follows and they flee. Mark and Reggie discover the body and then also flee.

The deal is done and the Sway family agrees to enter witness protection. A special hospital is located to take Ricky; after his recovery, they will be moved elsewhere. As soon as the family flies off in an FBI plane, Reggie reveals the location of the body to the FBI.

== Critical reception ==
The Chicago Tribune wrote that "the pace is plodding and because the book never gathers any momentum, it seems painfully overlong." Kirkus Reviews wrote that the book "opens with a neat hook into the reader's jaw- -and the tension never wavers."

== Adaptations ==
The novel was adapted into a film in 1994, The Client. It was directed by Joel Schumacher and starred Susan Sarandon, Tommy Lee Jones, Mary-Louise Parker, and newcomer Brad Renfro. The film was released on July 20, 1994.

For her work in the film, Susan Sarandon was nominated for an Academy Award for Best Actress and won a BAFTA Award for Best Actress in a Leading Role. Renfro won for an YoungStar Awards and Young Artist Awards.

The film was very successful. It spawned a television series The Client, starring JoBeth Williams and John Heard. It ran for one season (1995–1996).
