= 61* =

2001 television film by Billy Crystal

- Promotional poster
- Genre: Biographical drama; Sports drama
- Written by: Hank Steinberg
- Directed by: Billy Crystal
- Starring: Thomas Jane; Barry Pepper
- Music by: Marc Shaiman
- Country of origin: United States
- Original language: English

Production
- Executive producers: Billy Crystal; Ross Greenburg
- Producer: Robert F. Colesberry
- Cinematography: Haskell Wexler
- Editor: Michael Jablow
- Running time: 129 minutes
- Production companies: HBO Films; Face Productions

Original release
- Network: HBO
- Release: April 28, 2001

61* is a 2001 American sports drama television film directed and co-executive produced by Billy Crystal and written by Hank Steinberg. It stars Barry Pepper as Roger Maris and Thomas Jane as Mickey Mantle on their quest to break Babe Ruth's 1927 single-season home run record of 60 during the 1961 season of the New York Yankees. The film first aired on HBO on April 28, 2001.

== Plot ==
In 1998, the family of the late Roger Maris goes to Busch Stadium to witness Mark McGwire of the St. Louis Cardinals break their father's record with a 62nd home run. Maris' widow, Pat, is hospitalized due to complications from arrhythmia and watches the game on television from a hospital bed.

Decades earlier in 1961, Maris is presented with the Most Valuable Player award for the 1960 baseball season, but Mickey Mantle remains the New York Yankees' superstar. Mantle starts off hot while Maris struggles. Maris suspects he may be traded, but new manager Ralph Houk has Mantle and Maris switch places in the Yankees' batting order to see if it helps. It does, and Maris begins to hit home runs at a record pace. Mantle keeps pace and it becomes clear that both "M&M Boys" will make a run at Babe Ruth's record of 60 homers in one season.

Mickey's life off the field is taking a toll on his playing. He drinks, enjoys the Manhattan nightlife and arrives at the ballpark hung over. More than once, pitcher Whitey Ford has to bail him out or sober him up. To keep Mantle out of trouble, Maris and teammate/roommate Bob Cerv invite him to move in with them in a modest home in Queens, with one condition: no women.

New York's fans and media pull for the popular and personable Mantle, a long-time Yankee. The quieter Maris is viewed as an outsider, aloof and unworthy. As the two men close in on the record, MLB Commissioner Ford Frick, who was Babe Ruth's ghostwriter, makes a decision: unless the record is broken in 154 games, as Ruth did in 1927, the new mark would be listed separately indicating it had been done in baseball's newly expanded 162-game season.

It appears Mantle is not going to make it; his health deteriorates and he plays in constant pain. Maris, meanwhile, is unaccustomed to such a high level of public scrutiny and is uncomfortable interacting with the media, who dissect and distort everything he says or does. The fans heckle Maris and even throw objects at him on the field. Soon he begins receiving hate mail and death threats. His wife lives far from New York, usually available only by phone. The stress becomes so intense that Maris' hair begins to fall out in clumps. The Yankees owner also tries to favor Mantle by asking Houk to switch Mantle and Maris in the batting order, but Houk refuses, because the redesigned lineup has been winning a higher percentage of games.

Chronic injury and alcohol abuse catch up with Mantle, and an ill-advised injection by a doctor infects his hip and lands him in a hospital bed. With Mantle gone from the lineup, the stage becomes set for Maris. He fails to break the record in the 154th game of the season, but he does finally hit his 61st home run during the final game of the season.

== Cast ==
- Barry Pepper as Roger Maris
- Thomas Jane as Mickey Mantle
- Richard Masur as Milt Kahn
- Bobby Hosea as Elston Howard
- Bruce McGill as Ralph Houk
- Chris Bauer as Bob Cerv
- Christopher McDonald as Mel Allen
- Jennifer Crystal Foley as Pat Maris ('61)
- Bob Gunton as Dan Topping
- Donald Moffat as Ford Frick
- Joe Grifasi as Phil Rizzuto
- Peter Jacobson as Artie Green
- Robert Joy as Bob Ficshel
- Michael Nouri as Joe DiMaggio
- Seymour Cassel as Sam Simon
- Anthony Michael Hall as Whitey Ford
- Renée Taylor as Claire Ruth
- Patricia Crowley as Pat Maris ('98)
- Domenick Lombardozzi as Moose Skowron

== Filming locations ==
Most of the baseball action scenes, including those set at Yankee Stadium, were actually filmed at Tiger Stadium in Detroit, Michigan. A combination of strategic photographing and post-production effects were used to enhance the illusion of the "classic" layout of Yankee Stadium. Tiger Stadium was credited as "playing" Yankee Stadium in the closing credits. Tiger Stadium also "played itself" as the home of the Tigers when the Yankees played them in Detroit.

The shots depicting Fenway Park and Baltimore's Memorial Stadium were shot at the Los Angeles Memorial Coliseum.

== Critical reception ==
On the review aggregator website Rotten Tomatoes, 86% of 28 critics' reviews are positive, with an average rating of 6.8/10.

At the 59th Golden Globe Awards, actor Barry Pepper was nominated for Best Actor – Miniseries or Television Film.

== Awards and nominations ==
Year	Award	Category	Nominee(s)	Result	Refs
2001	Primetime Emmy Awards	Outstanding Made for Television Movie	Billy Crystal, Ross Greenburg and Robert F. Colesberry	Nominated	
2001	Primetime Emmy Awards	Outstanding Lead Actor in a Miniseries or a Movie	Barry Pepper	Nominated	
2001	Primetime Emmy Awards	Outstanding Directing for a Miniseries, Movie or a Special	Billy Crystal	Nominated	
2001	Primetime Emmy Awards	Outstanding Writing for a Miniseries or a Movie	Hank Steinberg	Nominated	
2001	Primetime Emmy Awards	Outstanding Art Direction for a Miniseries, Movie or a Special	Rusty Smith, Denise Hudson and Anne D. McCulley	Nominated	
2001	Primetime Emmy Awards	Outstanding Casting for a Miniseries, Movie or Special	Mali Finn	Won	
2001	Primetime Emmy Awards	Outstanding Cinematography for a Miniseries or a Movie	Haskell Wexler	Nominated	
2001	Primetime Emmy Awards	OOutstanding Hairstyling for a Miniseries, Movie or a Special	William A. Farley, Hazel Catmull and Dino Ganziano	Nominated}	
2001	Primetime Emmy Awards	Outstanding Makeup for a Miniseries, Movie or a Special	Peter Montagna, Patricia Bunch and Mark Landon	Nominated	
2001	Primetime Emmy Awards	Outstanding Single Camera Picture Editing for a Miniseries, Movie or a Special	Michael Jablow	Nominated	
2001	Primetime Emmy Awards	Outstanding Sound Editing for a Miniseries, Movie or a Special	Robert Grieve, Scott M. Silvey, Meg Taylor, Wayne Griffin, Kimberly Harris, Stephanie Lowry, Richard Partlow and Ellen Heuer	Won	
2001	Primetime Emmy Awards	Outstanding Single Camera Sound Mixing for a Miniseries or a Movie	Jeff Wexler, Matthew Iadarola, Gary Gegan and Gary Coppola	Nominated	

== See also ==
- List of baseball films
