= The Theory of the Leisure Class (film) =

The Theory of Leisure Class
- DVD cover
- Directed by: Gabriel Niccolo Bologna
- Screenplay by: Amber Benson; Gabriel Bologna
- Produced by: Erika Brannan; Athena Ashburn; Jeff Rice
- Starring: Tuesday Knight; Michael Massee; Christopher McDonald; Brad Renfro; Athena Stensland
- Cinematography: Christopher Tufty
- Edited by: Michael Berenson
- Production companies: Garibaldi Productions; IQ Entertainment
- Distributed by: IQ Entertainment
- Release date: July 6, 2001
- Running time: 109 minutes
- Country: United States
- Language: English
- Budget: $300,000

The Theory of Leisure Class is an American independent thriller film directed by Gabriel Niccolo Bologna and starring Brad Renfro, Tuesday Knight, and Michael Massee. The film centers on a series of murders targeting children in a small-town setting and was screened in July 2001 as part of the New York International Independent Film and Video Festival in West Hollywood and Beverly Hills. Following a limited circulation, it was later released on DVD on April 29, 2003.

== Plot ==
The plot revolves around the discovery of murdered children's bodies by kids on a field trip, triggering a, sordid, investigation that reveals a web of local corruption.

== Cast ==
- Tuesday Knight as Callie
- Athena Ashburn as Julie Mathews
- Brad Renfro as Billy
- Christopher McDonald as Buddy Barnett
- Michael Massee as McMillon
- Julie Stensland as Mama J.
- Brooke Conrad as Maria
- Erika Brannan as Cindie McKenna
- John Furlong as Emmet Masterson
- Heather Rattray as Attorney

== Production ==
The film was shot in 1998.

== Release ==
The film was screened in July 2001 as part of the New York International Independent Film and Video Festival in West Hollywood and Beverly Hills. The VHS/DVD were released on April 29, 2003.

== Reception ==
Robert Koehler of Variety stated that the film delivers "its one unearned idea" only in the final moments, after this "strained piece of American trailer-trash surrealism" has already collapsed from "creative exhaustion", adding that the filmmaking "lacks control" even as it tries a "woozy deconstruction of film noir", and concluding that its commercial outlook was bleak, with the "best hope" being European markets, since "post-theatrical biz appears nil".

AllMovie rated the film one out of five stars, while DVD Movie Reviews rated it two out of four stars.

=== Accolades ===
Award	Category	Nominee(s)	Result	Ref.
New York International Independent Film Festival	Best Thriller	The Theory of Leisure Class	Won	
New York International Independent Film Festival	Best Screenplay	The Theory of Leisure Class	Won	
New York International Independent Film Festival	Best Supporting Actor	Brad Renfro	Won	
