= Off Season (2001 film) =

- Written by: Glenn Gers
- Directed by: Bruce Davison
- Starring: Sherilyn Fenn; Rory Culkin
- Music by: Daniel Licht
- Country of origin: United States
- Original language: English

Production
- Producer: Rose Lam
- Cinematography: Tony Westman
- Editor: Tatiana S. Riegel
- Running time: 94 minutes
- Production companies: Palm Avenue Pictures; Phoenix Pictures; Hallmark Entertainment

Original release
- Network: Showtime
- Release: December 16, 2001

Off Season is a 2001 American television film directed by Bruce Davison, and starring Sherilyn Fenn, Rory Culkin, Hume Cronyn, Adam Arkin, and Bruce Davison. It is about a presumably disturbed little boy (Culkin) who has been orphaned, and who comes to believe that a local guest (Cronyn) who is staying at the hotel at which the boy's aunt works is actually Santa Claus. The film premiered on Showtime on December 16, 2001.

== Plot ==
After the death of his parents in a car crash, Jackson Mayhew is sent to live with his aunt who works in a hotel. He comes across an elderly gentleman named Sam and tells his aunt and the other children that Sam is actually Santa Claus on vacation. Sam recommends a psychiatrist to help Jackson work through his grief and enlists Jackson to help him give away some presents to vacationing children at the hotel. A police officer eventually discovers that "Santa" is a con-artist wanted in several states for grand theft, fraud and other crimes. But eventually Patty discovers that the officer was an actor who was hired by Sam to pretend that he was a criminal. The story ends when Jackson pieces together that Sam had sent them to the psychiatrist who in turn took Patty to the dinner theater where she discovers the officer, who has become her love interest, that arrested Sam is an actor. Sam’s hat is found hanging on the coat rack in the empty psychiatrist’s office. The closing scene reveals Sam in a Santa hat driving his red convertible north to the mountains.
