= Bruce Davison =

American actor (b. 1946)

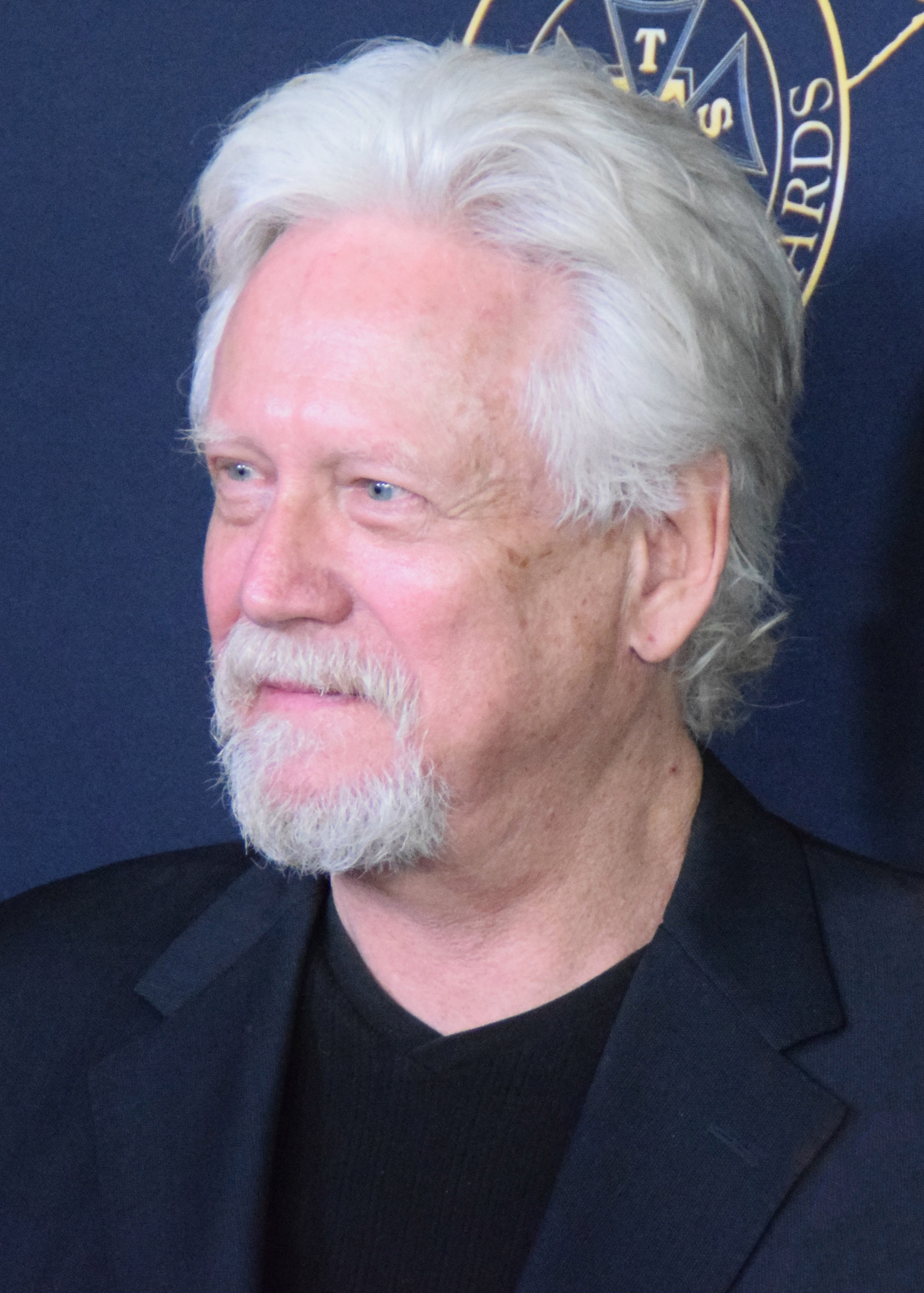
- Davison in 2015
- Born: June 28, 1946 (age 80); Philadelphia, Pennsylvania, U.S.
- Education: Pennsylvania State University, University Park (BA); New York University (MFA)
- Occupations: Actor; director
- Years active: 1968–present
- Spouses: Jess Walton (m. 1972; ann. 1973) Lisa Pelikan (m. 1986; div. 2006) Michele Correy (m. 2006)
- Children: 2

Bruce Davison (born June 28, 1946) is an American actor who has appeared in more than 270 films, television and stage productions since his debut in 1968. His breakthrough role was as Willard Stiles in the 1971 cult horror film Willard. He was nominated for the Academy Award for Best Supporting Actor, and won a Golden Globe Award and an Independent Spirit Award for his performance in Longtime Companion (1989).

Davison is also known for his roles as George Henderson on the television sitcom Harry and the Hendersons (1991–93), Captain Wyler on the crime drama series Hunter (1985–89), Howard Finnegan in Robert Altman's Short Cuts, Reverend Samuel Parris in the 1996 film adaptation of The Crucible, and as Senator Robert Kelly in the superhero films X-Men (2000) and X2 (2003). He is both a Daytime Emmy and a Primetime Emmy Award nominee.

== Early life ==
Davison was born in 1946 in Philadelphia, Pennsylvania. His parents divorced when he was three years old. He was raised by his mother and spent weekends with his father.

He graduated in 1964 from Marple Newtown Senior High School, entered Penn State as an art major, and then stumbled into acting when he accompanied a friend to an audition. He attended New York University's acting program, graduating in 1969.

== Career ==
Davison made his Broadway debut in Tiger at the Gates in 1968. He also appeared as John Merrick in The Elephant Man, and starred in The Glass Menagerie with Jessica Tandy. Davison was one of a quartet of newcomers, including Barbara Hershey, Richard Thomas, and Catherine Burns, when he made his film debut in Last Summer in 1969. In 1970, he played opposite Kim Darby in The Strawberry Statement, a film about peaceful student protest and its violent outcome. A year later he portrayed the title role in the 1971 version of Willard, based on the novel Ratman's Notebooks. He also appeared in Ulzana's Raid; Peege; Mame; Mother, Jugs & Speed; Short Eyes; The Lathe of Heaven and Six Degrees of Separation.

Davison was an uncredited extra in Steven Spielberg's Close Encounters of the Third Kind (1977). He recalled, "Steven Spielberg was a great friend, although I never got to work with him, except for playing an extra in Close Encounters of the Third Kind because we were friends. I got off the mothership as one of the pilots."

Davison has worked extensively in television. In 1973, he played the brother of a crippled Natalie Wood in the made-for-TV movie The Affair on ABC. In 1978, Davison appeared as Dean Torrence with Richard Hatch in the biopic Deadman's Curve (the story of 1960s pop duo Jan & Dean). The same year, he played the title role in the television film adaptation Summer of My German Soldier.

In 1981, he had the lead role in The Wave based on real events, starring as a history teacher who had conducted an experiment in Nazi philosophy on his own students.

Davison also starred in Tales from the Darkside (Season 1, Episode 8) and played the role of the father in the short-lived Harry and the Hendersons TV series.

In 1983, Davison was cast by Joseph Papp in the Public Theater/New York Shakespeare Festival production of King Richard III. Additional Off-Broadway credits include Love Letters, The Cocktail Hour and Paula Vogel's Pulitzer Prize-winning play How I Learned to Drive. He also played the role of Ruby in the 1985 comedy Spies Like Us, starring Dan Aykroyd and Chevy Chase.

In 1990, he portrayed a homosexual man whose lover is dying of AIDS in Longtime Companion. The role earned Davison a nomination for the Academy Award for Best Supporting Actor and a Golden Globe Award for Best Supporting Actor - Motion Picture. He concluded his Golden Globe acceptance speech with the hope that humankind would devote as much effort to the war on AIDS as its wars against each other. Davison appeared in other films addressing AIDS: in 1995's The Cure, he portrayed a physician sought by a young boy with AIDS in search of medical help. In 1996, Davison appeared in the film It's My Party, which chronicled the true events of a man dying with AIDS who decides to hold a farewell party for family and friends before taking his own life. Davison is a spokesperson for many AIDS-related groups and is a board member of the industry AIDS organization Hollywood Supports.

In Los Angeles, Davison has appeared on stage in Streamers and The Normal Heart, winning the Los Angeles Drama Critics Circle Award and Drama-Logue Award for his performances. Other theatre credits include The Caine Mutiny Court Martial (directed by Henry Fonda) and a stage adaptation of To Kill a Mockingbird.

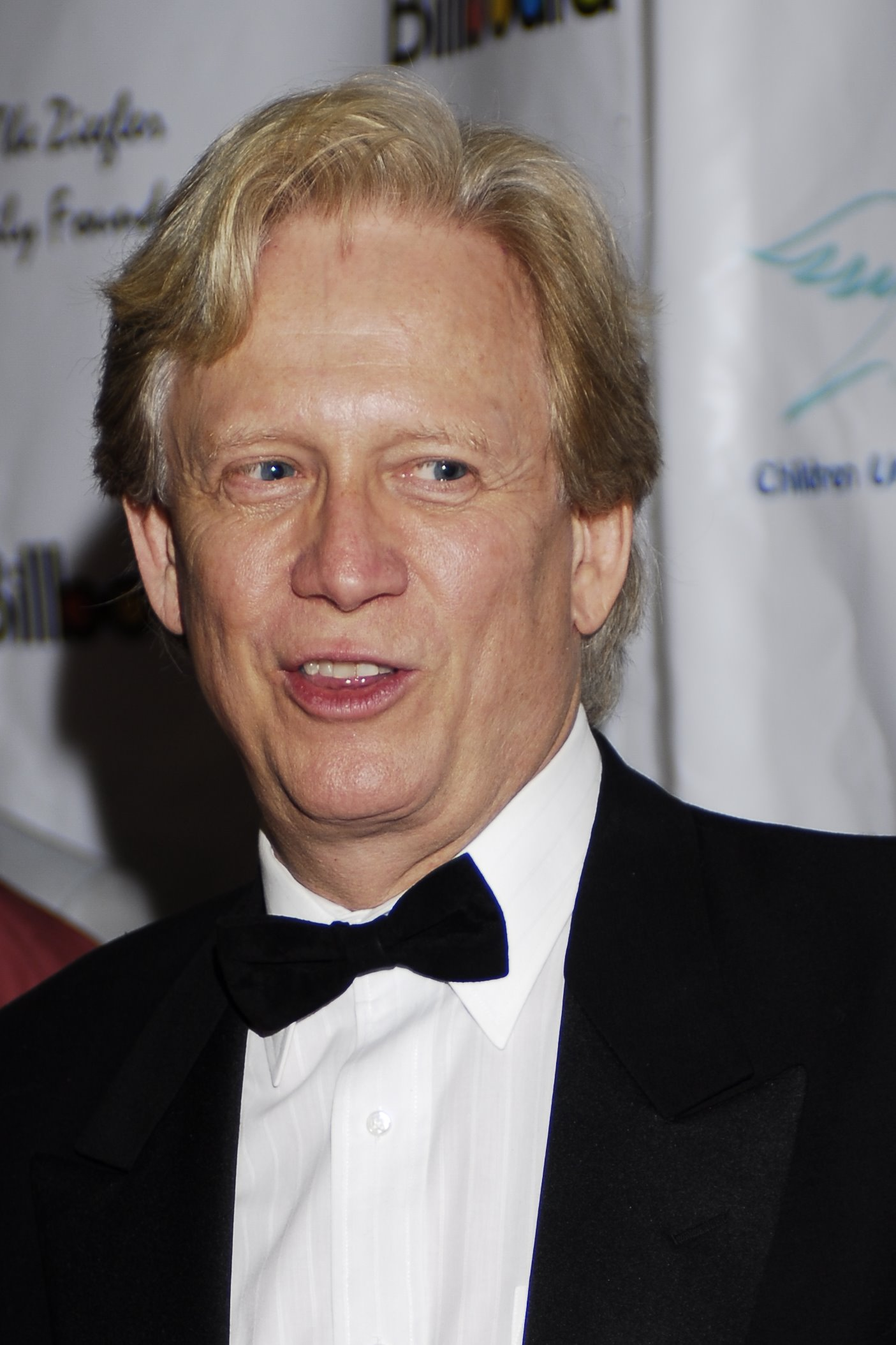
Davison at the 79th Annual Academy Awards Children Uniting Nations/Billboard after party, February 25, 2007

Davison had roles in Runaway Jury and Apt Pupil, as well as the X-Men film franchise as Robert Kelly in the first film and Mystique impersonating Kelly in X2. He was the fanatical Reverend Samuel Parris in Arthur Miller's screen adaptation of his play The Crucible. Davison also portrayed a rich philanthropist in the film Christmas Angel. Davison's many television credits include Hunter (in which he was a semi-regular for at least one season); Marcus Welby, M.D.; Love, American Style; The Waltons; Lou Grant; Murder, She Wrote; Designing Women; Seinfeld; Chicago Hope; Law & Order: Special Victims Unit; V: The Series; Star Trek: Voyager; Star Trek: Enterprise; Battlestar Galactica; Lost; CSI: Miami; Supernatural; Ghost Whisperer; Castle; Hawaii Five-0; the Stephen King mini-series Kingdom Hospital; and a recurring role on The Practice. He played Mark Davis, a therapist who was a love interest for Cybill Shepherd's character in a Season 1 episode ("Look Who's Stalking") of her sitcom Cybill. Davison also had the recurring role of defense attorney Doug Hellman in Close to Home.

In 2001, Davison directed the TV film Off Season, which starred Sherilyn Fenn, Rory Culkin, Hume Cronyn and Adam Arkin. In 2007, Davison returned to the big screen as the father of Eric O'Neill in Breach. Also in that year, Davison was cast in the role of Charles Graiman, a protege of Wilton Knight who was the creator of the Knight Industries Three Thousand, in NBC's revival of the television series Knight Rider.

Davison also played the role of Dr. Silberman, the psychiatrist who once tormented Sarah Connor, in the seventh episode of Terminator: The Sarah Connor Chronicles. He portrayed Nick Anderson (a secret Santa Claus) in the television film Christmas Angel in 2009. In May 2010, Davison was cast to portray art dealer Wilhelm Van Schlagel for several episodes on General Hospital to begin airing in July 2010.

In 2010, he starred in the television film Titanic II. In 2011, he starred as Police Chief Kirkhoven in the film Munger Road, and appeared in the Christmas film 3 Holiday Tails. In 2012, he appeared in Rob Zombie's The Lords of Salem. In addition, he played Secretary of State William H. Seward in the film Saving Lincoln.

He played the role of Rear Admiral Arthur Shepard, Lieutenant Grace Shepard's father, in the short-stint TV series Last Resort.

In 2016, Davison starred as Dr. Stanley Cole in the comedy/fantasy Abnormal Attraction.

On December 12, 2025, Bruce guest-starred in the "Heaven and Nature" episode of NCIS as Lester Burm.

== Personal life ==
From 1969 to 1971, Davison had an unpublicized affair with married actress Sondra Locke. In 2017, one year before Locke's death, Davison acknowledged their affair on the DVD commentary for Willard.

Davison has been married three times and has two children. He married actress Jess Walton on May 20, 1972, but the marriage was annulled in March 1973. He was engaged to actress Karen Austin. He has a son from his marriage to actress Lisa Pelikan. They were married from July 4, 1986 until their divorce in April 2006. Davison and Michele Correy married on April 30, 2006. They have a daughter, and reside in Woodland Hills, California.

== Filmography ==
=== Film ===
Year	Title	Role	Notes
1969	Last Summer	Dan	
1970	The Strawberry Statement	Simon	
1971	Willard	Willard Stiles	
1971	Been Down So Long It Looks Like Up to Me	Fitzgore	
1972	The Jerusalem File	David Armstrong	
1972	Ulzana's Raid	Lt. Garnett DeBuin	
1973	Peege	Greg	Short film
1974	Mame	Patrick Dennis	
1976	Grand Jury	Bobby Allen	
1976	Mother, Jugs & Speed	Leroy Watkins	
1977	Short Eyes	Clark Davis	
1977	The Gathering	George	
1978	Brass Target	Col. Robert Dawson	
1978	French Quarter	Kid Ross / Inspector Sordik	
1978	Summer of My German Soldier	Anton Friedrich Reiker	
1980	The Lathe of Heaven	George Orr	
1981	High Risk	Dan	
1983	Lies	Stuart Russell	
1984	Crimes of Passion	Donny Hopper	
1985	Spies Like Us	Ruby	
1986	The Ladies Club	Richard Harrison	
1987	The Misfit Brigade	Corporal Joseph Porta	
1989	Longtime Companion	David Elders	
1991	Steel and Lace	Albert Morton	
1993	Short Cuts	Howard Finnigan	
1993	Six Degrees of Separation	Larkin	
1995	Far from Home: The Adventures of Yellow Dog	John McCormick	
1995	Widow's Kiss	Justin	
1995	The Cure	Dr. Jensen	
1995	The Baby-Sitters Club	Watson Brewer	
1996	It's My Party	Rodney Bingham	
1996	Grace of My Heart	John Murray	
1996	The Crucible	Reverend Samuel Parris	
1997	Lovelife	Bruce	
1998	Paulie	Dr. Reingold	
1998	Apt Pupil	Richard Bowden	
1999	At First Sight	Dr. Charles Aaron	
2000	The King Is Alive	Ray	
2000	X-Men	Senator Robert Kelly	
2001	Crazy/Beautiful	Tom Oakley	
2001	Summer Catch	Rand Parrish	
2002	High Crimes	Brigadier General Bill Marks	
2002	Dahmer	Lionel Dahmer	
2003	X2	Senator Robert Kelly	
2003	Willard	Alfred Stiles	
2003	Runaway Jury	Durwood Cable	
2005	Hate Crime	Pastor Boyd	
2005	Going Shopping	Adam	
2005	8mm 2	Ambassador Harrington	
2006	The Dead Girl	Leah's Father	
2007	Breach	John O'Neill	
2009	The Line	Anthony	
2009	MegaFault	Dr. Mark Rhodes	
2009	Christmas Angel	Nick Anderson	
2009	A Golden Christmas	Rod Wright	
2010	Arctic Blast	Winslaw	
2010	Titanic II	James Maine	
2010	Camp Hell	Father Phineas McAllister	
2010	Justice League: Crisis on Two Earths	President Slade Wilson (voice)	Direct-to-video
2011	Munger Road	Chief Kirkhoven	
2011	3 Holiday Tails	Rod Wright	
2011	Earth's Final Hours	Rothman	
2011	Coffin	Garrison	
2011	Elwood	Congressman Barber	Short film
2012	Return of the Killer Shrews	Jerry Farrell	
2012	The Lords of Salem	Francis Matthias	
2013	Saving Lincoln	William H. Seward	
2013	Words and Pictures	Walt	
2014	Persecuted	Senator Donald Harrison	
2014	37	Psychic	
2015	Black Beauty	Grandpa	
2015	The Leisure Class	Edward	
2015	Oceanus: Act One	Commander Mitch Conrad	Short film
2016	The Curse of Sleeping Beauty	Richard Meyers	
2016	Get A Job	Lawrence Wilheimer	
2016	The Bronx Bull	D.A. Bonomi	
2017	9/11	Monohan	
2017	Yamasong: March of the Hollows	P'Torr The Exile (voice)	
2018	Insidious: The Last Key	Christian Rainer	
2018	Along Came the Devil	Reverend Michael	
2018	Abnormal Attraction	Dr. Cole	
2019	Itsy Bitsy	Walter	
2019	Wish Man	Frank Shankwitz Sr.	
2019	The Great Alaskan Race	Governor Bone	
2019	More Beautiful for Having Been Broken	Colin	
2020	We Still Say Grace	Harold	
2020	Influence	Walter Klein	
2021	The Manor	Roland	
2023	Condor's Nest	Gerhardt Schrude	
2023	Suitable Flesh	Ephraim Waite	
2026	Casa Grande		
2026	Godmother	Mr. Martinson	

=== Television ===
Year	Title	Role	Notes
1970	Medical Center	Mickey Peters	Episode: "A Duel with Doom"
1970	NBC Experiment in Television	Young Ishmael	Episode: "Moby Tick"
1970–79	Insight	Various roles	4 episodes
1971	Owen Marshall, Counselor at Law	Raymond 'Cowboy' Leatherberry	Episode: "A Pattern of Morality"
1972	Marcus Welby, M.D.	Donald Lorimer	Episode: "Love Is When They Say They Need You"
1973	Hec Ramsey	Josh Hollister	Episode: "The Mystery of Chalk Hill"
1973	Cops	Detective Dennis Till	Television film
1973	Love, American Style	David	Episode: "Love and the Secret Spouse"
1973	Break Up	Himself	Television special
1973	The Affair	Jamie Patterson	Television film
1974	Love Story	Jeffrey	Episode: "Time for Love"
1974	Ma and Pa	Frank	Television film
1974	The Lives of Benjamin Franklin	William Franklin	4 episodes
1974–78	Police Story	Clyde Griffiths, Victor Joe Vero	2 episodes
1975	The Waltons	Bob Hill	Episode: "The Shivaree"
1975	The Last Survivors	Michael Larsen	Television film
1976	Police Woman	Binns	Episode: "Bait"
1977	ABC Weekend Specials	Bruce	Episode: "Portrait of Grandpa Doc"
1977	The Gathering	George	Television film
1978	Deadman's Curve	Dean Torrence	Television film
1978	Summer of My German Soldier	Anton Reiker	Television film
1978	Mourning Becomes Electra	Orin Mannon	5 episodes
1979	Mind Over Murder	Jason	Television film
1979	The Gathering, Part II	George	Television film
1979	Lou Grant	Andrew Raines	2 episodes
1980	The Lathe of Heaven	George Orr	Television film
1981	The Wave	Ben Ross	Television film
1981	Incident at Crestridge	Clint Larsen	Television film
1982	The Astronauts	Technical Officer David Ackroyd	Television film
1983	Ghost Dancing	Calvin Oberst	Television film
1984	Tales from the Darkside	Richard Hagstrom	Episode: "The Word Processor of the Gods"
1985	V	John Langley	3 episodes
1985–89	Hunter	Captain/Deputy Chief Wyler	16 episodes
1987	Murder, She Wrote	David Carroll	Episode: "The Cemetery Vote"
1990	Designing Women	Reverend Eugene "Gene" Chapman	Episode: "Have Faith"
1991–93	Harry and the Hendersons	George Henderson	72 episodes
1992	Desperate Choices: To Save My Child	Richard Robbins	Television film
1992	Live! From Death Row	Laurence Dvorak	Television film
1993	A Mother's Revenge	Bill Sanders	Television film
1995	Down, Out & Dangerous	Brad Harrington	Television film
1995	The Outer Limits	Dr. McEnerney	Episode: "White Light Fever"
1995	Cybill	Mark Davis	Episode: "Look Who's Stalking"
1996	Star Trek: Voyager	Jareth	Episode: "Remember"
1996	After Jimmy	Ward "Sam" Stapp	Television film
1996	Hidden in America	Dr. Michael Millerton	Television film
1996–97	Seinfeld	Wyck	3 episodes
1998	Touched by an Angel	Jacob "Jake" Weiss	Episode: "Elijah"
1999	Vendetta	Thomas Semmes	Television film
1999–2000	Chicago Hope	Dr. Burt Peters	2 episodes
2000–01	The Practice	Scott Wallace	9 episodes
2001	Off Season	Dr. Zimmer	Television film (also director)
2002	Without a Trace	Paul Cartwright	Episode: "Pilot"
2002	Law & Order: Special Victims Unit	Dr. Graham Mandell	Episode: "Waste"
2002	Star Trek: Enterprise	Menos	Episode: "The Seventh"
2002	L.A. Law: The Movie	Lawrence Diebenkorn	Television film
2003	Out of the Ashes	Peter Schuman	Television film
2004	Kingdom Hospital	Dr. Stegman	13 episodes
2004	JAG	Dr. Morris Sperling	Episode: "The Man on the Bridge"
2005	Numb3rs	Robert Oliver	Episode: "Sacrifice"
2005	The Triangle	Stan Lathem	3 episodes
2005	Law & Order: Trial by Jury	Peter Betts	Episode: "Baby Boom"
2005–07	Close to Home	Attorney Doug Hellman	13 episodes
2006	CSI: Miami	Dane Daniels	Episode: "Dead Air"
2006–10	Lost	Dr. Douglas Brooks	2 episodes
2007	The L Word	Leonard Kroll	3 episodes
2007	Battlestar Galactica	Dr. Michael Robert	Episode: "The Woman King"
2008	The Librarian: Curse of the Judas Chalice	Professor Lazlo / Count Dracula	Television film
2008	Terminator: The Sarah Connor Chronicles	Dr. Peter Silberman	Episode: "The Demon Hand"
2008–09	Knight Rider	Dr. Charles Graiman	11 episodes
2009	Criminal Minds	Father Davison	Episode: "Demonology"
2009–10	Ghost Whisperer	Josh Bedford	5 episodes
2010	Psych	Walter Snowden	Episode: "Think Tank"
2010	General Hospital	Wilhelm von Schlagel	5 episodes
2011	Castle	Lou Karnacki	Episode: "Law & Murder"
2011	CSI: Crime Scene Investigation	Avery Tinsdale	Episode: "Father of the Bride"
2011	Hawaii Five-0	Steven Carver	Episode: "Ua Lawe Wale (Taken)"
2011	Childrens Hospital	Narrator	Episode: "Childrens Hospital: A Play in Three Acts"
2011	Covert Affairs	Max Langford	Episode: "Horse to Water"
2011–12	Drop Dead Diva	Judge Cyrus Maxwell	3 episodes
2012	Bigfoot	Sheriff Walt Gunderson	Television film (also director)
2012	Luck	Hartstone	2 episodes
2012	Don't Trust the B— in Apartment 23	Gabe Sharpe	Episode: "Whatever It Takes..."
2012–13	Last Resort	Admiral Arthur Shepard	6 episodes
2014	Those Who Kill	Howard Burgess	10 episodes
2014	The Legend of Korra	Zuko (voice)	6 episodes
2014	Sequestered	Mr. Firman	12 episodes
2014–16	Kingdom	Ron Prince	4 episodes
2015–18	The Fosters	Stuart Adams	5 episodes
2016	The Exorcist	Pope Sebastian	Episode: "Chapter Ten: Three Rooms"
2016	TripTank	Daytona Jack (voice)	Episode: "Buck Wild"
2017	Love Locks	Hugo Blanchet	Television film
2018	Mozart in the Jungle	Hesby	3 episodes
2018	Forgive Me	Archbishop	Episode: "With the Help of Your Grace To Sin No More"
2019	Creepshow	Avery "Whitey" Whitlock	Episode: "Night of the Paw/Times is Tough in Musky Holler"
2019	The Son	Roy Endicott	Episode: "Legend"
2019	Defrost: The Virtual Series	Michael Garrison	Television film
2019	Christmas at the Plaza	Reginald Brookwater	Television film
2020	The Gift of Christmas	Bob Rodgers	Television film
2022	Ozark	Sen. Randall Schafer	6 episodes
2022	The Lincoln Lawyer	Judge Walter Abrams	Episode: "The Brass Verdict"
2022–23	1923	Arthur	2 episodes
2023–25	Bosch: Legacy	James Rafferty	2 episodes

== Stage credits ==
Year	Title	Role	Venue	Notes
1968	Tiger at the Gates	Troilus	Vivian Beaumont Theater, New York City	
1969	A Home Away From	Gordon	South Village Theatre, New York City	
1979	As You Like It	Orlando	Long Beach Arena Theater, Long Beach	
1980	A Life in the Theatre	John	Matrix Theatre, Los Angeles	
1980	The Elephant Man	John Merrick	Booth Theatre, New York City	Replacement
1982	The Elephant Man	John Merrick	Westport Country Playhouse, Westport	
1983	Richard III	Duke of Clarence	Delacorte Theater, New York City	
1983–84	The Glass Menagerie	Tom Wingfield	Eugene O'Neill Theatre, New York City	
1985-86	The Normal Heart	Felix Turner	Las Palmas Theatre, Los Angeles	
1989	The Cocktail Hour	John	Promenade Theatre, New York City	
1989-90	Love Letters	Andrew Makepeace Ladd III	Promenade Theatre, New York City	
1989-90	Love Letters	Andrew Makepeace Ladd III	Edison Theatre, New York City	
1994	To Kill a Mockingbird	Atticus Finch	La Mirada Theatre for the Performing Arts, La Miranda	
1997	How I Learned to Drive	Peck	Century Center For The Performing Arts, New York City	
2005	Casablanca	Emil	Hollywood Pantages Theatre, Los Angeles	Staged reading
2010	California Suite		Skirball Cultural Center, Los Angeles	
2010	The Graduate		Skirball Cultural Center, Los Angeles	
2014	A Song at Twilight	Hugo Latymer	Pasadena Playhouse, Pasadena	
2016	Fuck My Life	Interviewer	Let Live Theatre, West Hollywood	
2018	Native Gardens	Frank Butley	Pasadena Playhouse, Pasadena	

== Awards and nominations ==
Institution	Year	Category	Work	Result
Academy Awards	1991	Best Supporting Actor	Longtime Companion	Nominated
Daytime Emmy Awards	2002	Outstanding Directing For A Children's Series	Off Season	Nominated
Film Independent Spirit Awards	1991	Best Supporting Male	Longtime Companion	Won
Golden Globes	1991	Best Supporting Actor – Motion Picture	Longtime Companion	Won
Golden Globes	1994	Special Ensemble Cast Award	Short Cuts	Won
Los Angeles Film Critics Association	1990	Best Supporting Actor	Longtime Companion	2nd place
National Society of Film Critics	1991	Best Supporting Actor	Longtime Companion	Won
New York Film Critics Circle	1990	Best Supporting Actor	Longtime Companion	Won
Primetime Emmy Awards	1998	Outstanding Guest Actor in a Drama Series	Touched by an Angel ("Elijah")	Nominated
Satellite Awards	2012	Honorary Award	—N/a	Won
Venice Film Festival	1993	Best Ensemble Cast	Short Cuts	Won
