= The Affair (1973 film) =

1973 film by Gilbert Cates

- Genre: Drama; Romance
- Written by: Barbara Turner
- Directed by: Gilbert Cates
- Starring: Natalie Wood; Robert Wagner; Bruce Davison; Jamie Smith-Jackson
- Music by: George Aliceson Tipton
- Country of origin: United States
- Original language: English

Production
- Executive producers: Aaron Spelling; Leonard Goldberg
- Cinematography: Gerald Hirschfeld
- Editor: Folmar Blangsted
- Running time: 74 minutes
- Production company: Spelling-Goldberg Productions
- Budget: $765,000

Original release
- Network: ABC
- Release: November 20, 1973

The Affair is a 1973 American TV movie directed by Gilbert Cates and starring Natalie Wood, Robert Wagner, Bruce Davison and Jamie Smith-Jackson.

The film starred Natalie Wood in her first appearance since Bob & Carol & Ted & Alice. Her co-star was Robert Wagner, her first husband whom she recently remarried.

== Plot ==
Courtney Patterson is a beautiful 32 year old songwriter who is physically disabled due to polio. Her condition has made her emotionally guarded, but when she meets Marcus Simon, a handsome older attorney, she cautiously moves towards romance. Although Courtney remains wary of intimacy, Marcus slowly wins her over. Unfortunately, her family is not supportive of their relationship, providing yet another obstacle that the couple must overcome.

Marcus Simon (Wagner) meets Courtney when he is briefly employed by the family to handle a legal matter for them. Both of them are timid about approaching romance - Courtney because of her medical condition; Marcus because his wife recently left him for another man and took their two sons with her. A family dinner establishes that there is some tension between Courtney's wealthy parents (Kent Smith, Frances Reid) and their two children. Courtney's younger brother (Davison) is an aspiring artist who disdains the family fortune and lives simply with his girlfriend Jennifer (Jackson).

Courtney and Marcus rent a luxury cottage and begin seeing each other regularly. Just as Courtney is getting used to the comfort of romance, Marcus attends the wedding of his ex-wife and is made fun of by the new groom for being "inadequate".

A jumpy Marcus calls off the relationship. Courtney makes a halfhearted attempt at suicide by slashing her wrists. Her brother looks after her - saying Marcus has been calling regularly and "He'll come if you want him to come".

The film ends with the question of their resuming their relationship unanswered.

== Cast ==
- Natalie Wood as Courtney Patterson
- Robert Wagner as Marcus Simon
- Bruce Davison as Jamie Patterson
- Jamie Smith-Jackson as Jennifer (as Jamie Smith Jackson)
- Pat Harrington Jr. as Frank (as Pat Harrington)
- Kent Smith as Mr. Patterson
- Paul Ryan as Bobbie
- Frances Reid as Mrs. Patterson
- Mark Roberts as Howard
- Anna Aries as Annie Simon
- Steve Riskas as Peter
- Brett Ericson as Evan
- Robert Stull as Michael
- Anna Karen as Willa
- Paul Pepper as Engineer
- Suzanne Taylor as Hostess (as Sue Taylor)
- Victoria Carroll as First Man's Wife
- Keith Walker as First Man
- Marland Proctor as Second Man

== Production ==
Wagner and Wood made the film for Spelling-Goldberg Productions, which offered them a development deal for a series in which they did not appear. The series ended up being Charlie's Angels.

It was originally called Love Song. The film's budget was twice the normal amount of the typical TV movie with Sir Lew Grade supplying the balance to enable the film to be released theatrically outside the US.

== Reception ==
The Los Angeles Times wrote "Natalie Wood turns in what is perhaps her finest performance to date."

Wagner and Wood had remarried (2nd time) shortly before shooting began. As "marrieds", this may explain how some daring-for-the-time bedroom scenes remained in the film.

== See also ==
- List of American films of 1973
