= Joseph Mazzello =

American actor (born 1983)

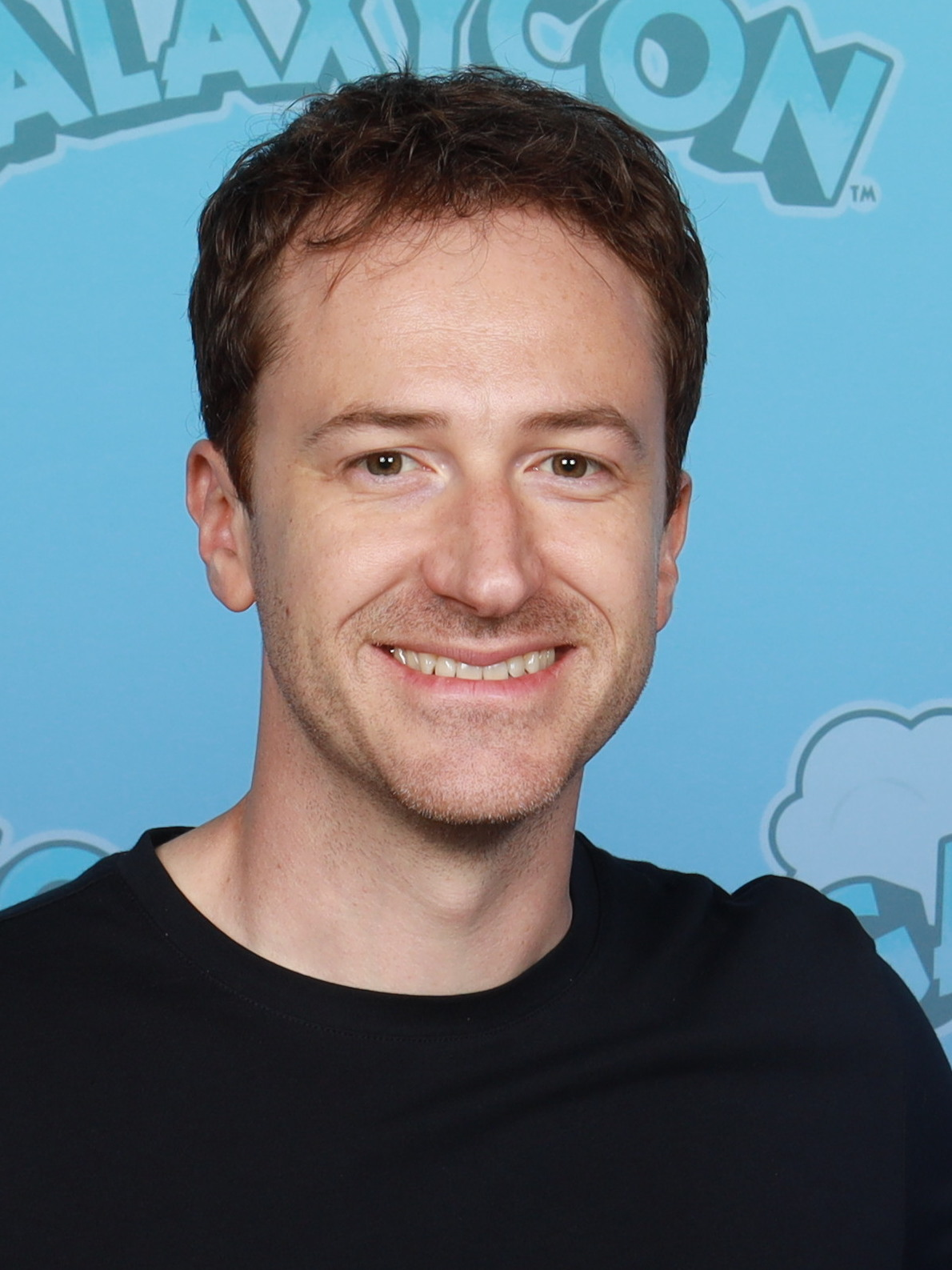
- Mazzello at GalaxyCon Raleigh in 2025
- Born: Joseph Francis Mazzello III; September 21, 1983 (age 43); Rhinebeck, New York, U.S.
- Other name: Joe Mazzello
- Education: University of Southern California
- Occupations: Actor; director; screenwriter
- Years active: 1990–present
- Website: josephmazzello.com

Joseph Francis Mazzello III (born September 21, 1983) is an American actor. He began his career as a child actor and played Tim Murphy in Jurassic Park and Roarke Hartman in The River Wild. As an adult, Mazzello is best known for his portrayal of real-life figures Eugene Sledge in the HBO miniseries The Pacific, Dustin Moskovitz in The Social Network, and John Deacon in the biopic Bohemian Rhapsody.

== Early life ==
Joseph Francis Mazzello III was born on September 21, 1983, in Rhinebeck, New York, and raised in Hyde Park, New York, the son of Virginia (née Strong) and Joseph Francis Mazzello Jr., who owned a dance studio. Mazzello went to the Catholic school Our Lady of Lourdes. He is an alumnus of the University of Southern California, entering the USC School of Cinematic Arts in 2001 following a recommendation letter from director Steven Spielberg. Mazzello paid for school with his salary from a small appearance in The Lost World: Jurassic Park (1997), something the actor jokingly referred to as his graduation present from Spielberg.

== Career ==
=== 1990–2000: Early career ===
Mazzello's first film appearance was a small role in the 1990 legal thriller Presumed Innocent, starring Harrison Ford. He then went on to appear in Radio Flyer, Jersey Girl and the TV film Desperate Choices: To Save My Child in 1992. In 1993, Mazzello got his first big breakthrough when he portrayed Tim Murphy in Steven Spielberg's Jurassic Park. His character in Jurassic Park is the grandson of John Hammond, played by Richard Attenborough. Later in the same year, Mazzello also co-starred in Richard Attenborough's film Shadowlands, and in The River Wild as Roarke Hartman.

In 1995, Mazzello had roles in The Cure and Three Wishes. Both films were critical and commercial failures. Mazzello continued his film career with lead roles in Star Kid in 1997, and in Simon Birch with Ian Michael Smith in 1998, which were also critical and commercial flops. He also provided voice-over work in the English dub of The Adventures of Buratino.

=== 2001–2009: Television debut and directorial debut ===
Mazzello's first film role in the 2000s was in 2001's Wooly Boys with Peter Fonda and Kris Kristofferson. In 2002, Mazzello made his television debut on Providence. He then appeared on CBS' hit shows CSI: Crime Scene Investigation and Without a Trace. Afterwards, he appeared in films Raising Helen (2004), The Hollow (2004), The Sensation of Sight (2006), and the short film Beyond All Boundaries (2009). In 2007, Mazzello made his directorial debut with the short film Matters of Life and Death.

=== 2010–present: Further work ===
In 2010, Mazzello played Dustin Moskovitz, one of the co-founders of Facebook, in the David Fincher-directed biographical drama film The Social Network. His performance was well-received by critics and he and the cast were nominated for several awards. During this, he played Eugene Sledge on the mini-series The Pacific. Between 2011 and 2012, Mazzello appeared in the short films Allison and First Kiss, and the A&E miniseries Coma.

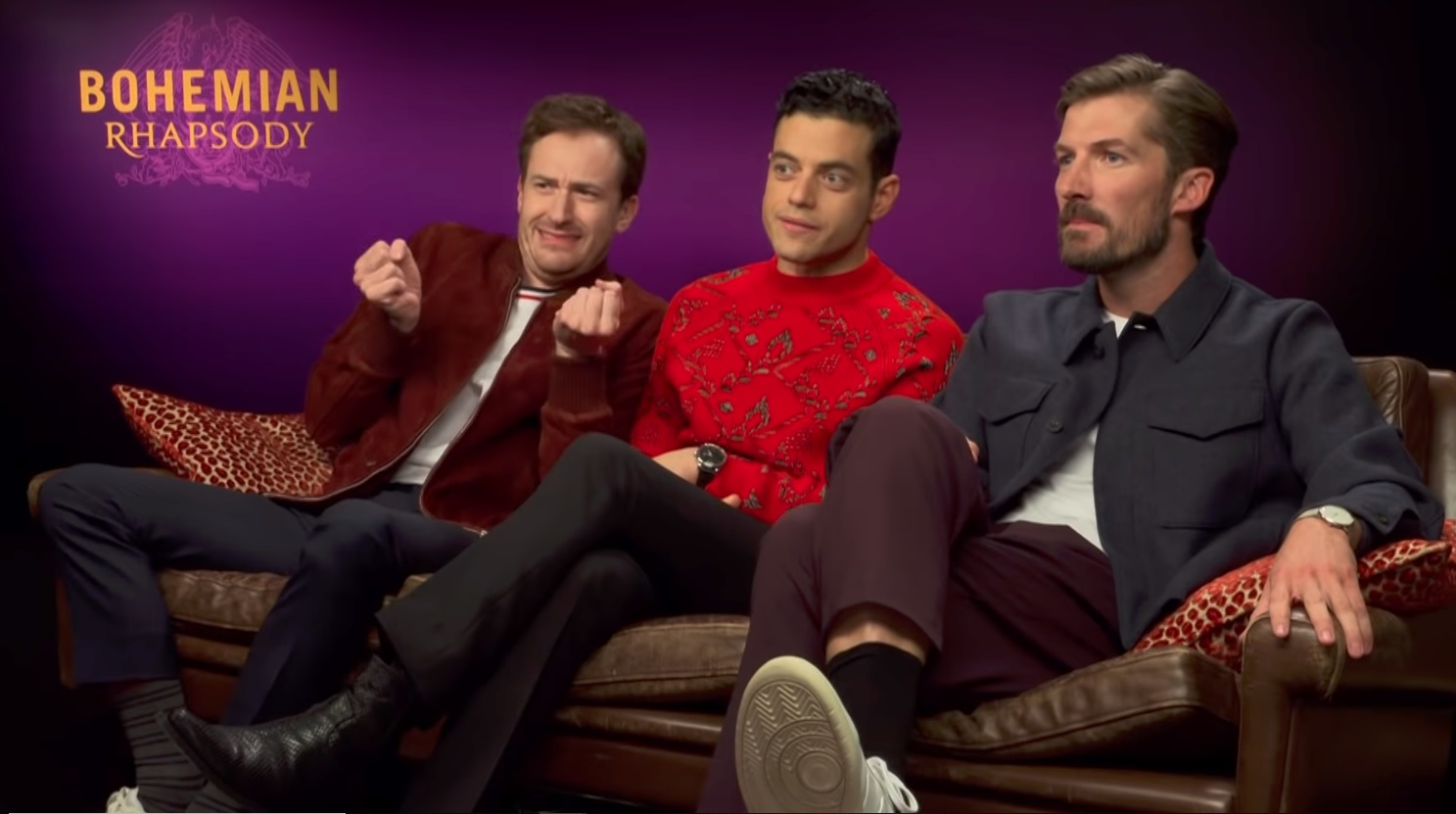
Mazzello (left) with Rami Malek and Gwilym Lee promoting Bohemian Rhapsody in 2018.

In 2013, Mazzello played a recurring role on the FX series Justified as Billy St. Cyr, and in the independent film Dear Sidewalk, directed by Jake Oelman. He also contributed to a brief supporting role in G.I. Joe: Retaliation as Mouse. In 2016, he made his feature film directoral debut in the sports comedy-drama Undrafted. He then portrayed John Deacon in the 2018 Queen biopic Bohemian Rhapsody, reuniting with his co-star from The Pacific, Rami Malek. From 2014 to 2021, Mazzello made appearances on television series such as Person of Interest, Elementary, and Impeachment: American Crime Story.

In 2026 he starred alongside Jon Voight (who played his father) in the Bryan Singer-directed film Monument. Film Threat opined: "Mazzello is superb, bringing warmth and understanding to a part that could’ve been boring in the wrong hands."

== Filmography ==
=== Film ===
Year	Title	Role	Notes
1990	Presumed Innocent	Wendell McGaffney	
1992	Radio Flyer	Bobby	
1992	Jersey Girl	Jason	
1993	Jurassic Park	Tim Murphy	
1993	Shadowlands	Douglas Gresham	
1994	The River Wild	Roarke Hartman	
1995	The Cure	Dexter	
1995	Three Wishes	Tom Holman	
1997	The Lost World: Jurassic Park	Tim Murphy	Cameo
1997	Star Kid	Spencer Griffith	
1998	Simon Birch	Joe Wenteworth	
1998	The New Adventures of Buratino	Buratino	Voice; English dub
2001	Wooly Boys	Charles	
2004	Raising Helen	Prom date Peter	
2004	The Hollow	Scott	
2006	The Sensation of Sight	Tripp	
2007	Matters of Life and Death	David Jennings	Short film; also director and writer
2009	Beyond All Boundaries	Eugene Sledge	Short film
2010	The Social Network	Dustin Moskovitz	
2011	Allison	Joe	Short film
2011	First Kiss	Derek	Short film
2013	G.I. Joe: Retaliation	Mouse	
2013	Dear Sidewalk	Gardner	
2016	Undrafted	Pat Murray	Also director, producer and writer
2018	Bohemian Rhapsody	John Deacon	
2023	Unexpected	Bob	
2026	Monument	Amnon Rechter	

=== Television ===
Year	Title	Role	Notes
1990	Unspeakable Acts	Jason Harrison	Television film
1992	Desperate Choices: To Save My Child	Willy Robbins	Television film
1995	A Father for Charlie	Charlie	Television film
2002	Providence	Tony	2 episodes
2003	CSI: Crime Scene Investigation	Justin Lamond	Episode: "One Hit Wonder"
2004	Without a Trace	Sean Stanley	Episode: "Legacy"
2010	The Pacific	Eugene Sledge	Miniseries; 10 episodes
2012	Coma	Geoffrey Fairweather	Miniseries; 2 episodes
2013	Justified	Billy St. Cyr	3 episodes
2014	Person of Interest	Daniel Casey	2 episodes
2016	Elementary	Griffin	Episode: "A Study in Charlotte"
2021	Impeachment: American Crime Story	Paul Begala	Recurring role

== Awards and nominations ==
Year	Association	Category	Nominated work	Result
1992	Young Artist Award	Best Young Actor Under 10 in a Motion Picture	Radio Flyer	Nominated
1992	Young Artist Award	Best Young Actor Under 10 in a Television Movie	Desperate Choices: To Save My Child	Nominated
1994	Saturn Award	Best Performance by a Younger Actor	Jurassic Park	Nominated
1994	Young Artist Award	Best Youth Actor Co-Starring in a Motion Picture: Drama	Jurassic Park	Won
1996	Young Artist Award	Best Young Leading Actor: Feature Film	The Cure	Nominated
1999	Young Artist Award	Best Performance in a Feature Film: Leading Young Actor	Simon Birch	Nominated
1999	YoungStar Award	Best Young Actor in a Drama Film	Simon Birch	Won
2010	Hollywood Film Awards	Best Cast	The Social Network	Won
2010	Phoenix Film Critics Society	Best Cast	The Social Network	Won
2010	San Diego Film Critics Society	Best Cast	The Social Network	Nominated
2010	Washington D.C. Area Film Critics Association	Best Ensemble	The Social Network	Nominated
2011	Central Ohio Film Critics Association	Best Ensemble	The Social Network	Nominated
2011	Critics' Choice Movie Awards	Best Acting Ensemble	The Social Network	Nominated
2011	Gold Derby Awards	Best Ensemble Cast	The Social Network	Nominated
2011	Palm Springs International Film Festival	Ensemble Cast	The Social Network	Won
2019	Screen Actors Guild Award	Outstanding Performance by a Cast in a Motion Picture	Bohemian Rhapsody	Nominated
