= The Cure (1995 film) =

1995 American drama film

- Theatrical release poster
- Directed by: Peter Horton
- Written by: Robert Kuhn
- Produced by: Mark Burg; Eric Eisner
- Starring: Joseph Mazzello; Brad Renfro; Diana Scarwid; Bruce Davison; Annabella Sciorra
- Cinematography: Andrew Dintenfass
- Edited by: Anthony Sherin
- Music by: Dave Grusin
- Production company: Island World
- Distributed by: Universal Pictures
- Release date: April 21, 1995
- Running time: 98 minutes
- Country: United States
- Language: English
- Budget: $10 million
- Box office: $2.57 million (US)

The Cure is a 1995 American drama film directed by Peter Horton and written by Robert Kuhn. The film stars Brad Renfro and Joseph Mazzello and follows an unlikely friendship between two boys, one of whom is suffering from AIDS. When the boys hear of a possible cure for the disease, they set out on a quest to find it.

The film was distributed by Universal Pictures and was released to theaters on April 21, 1995. It was not a box-office success, earning only $2.57 million. Although The Cure received mixed reviews from critics, the performances of Mazzello and Renfro received acclaim and both actors earned Young Artist Awards nominations.

Horton received the Audience Award at the Cinekid Festival and Renfro won an award for Best Performance in a Drama Film at the first annual YoungStar Awards. The film also received a Grammy Award nomination for its score by Dave Grusin.

== Plot ==
Erik is a thirteen-year-old loner who has just moved to a small town in Stillwater, Minnesota. Accompanying Erik is his newly divorced, emotionally abusive and neglectful workaholic mother, Gail. Erik and his eleven-year-old neighbor Dexter, who contracted HIV through a blood transfusion, become good friends despite initial mutual dislike and their differences, as Erik seeks the familial relationships he grew up without in Dexter and his mother Linda. Erik hides the friendship from his mother, knowing that she won't approve due to her own prejudice regarding AIDS.

Gail discovers the friendship one night after Linda comes over to ask Erik about something Dexter ate in the boys' quest to find a natural cure for his disease. She furiously warns Linda to keep Dexter away, but Linda encourages the friendship. When the boys read an article in a tabloid about a doctor in distant New Orleans who claims to have found a cure for AIDS, they set out on their own down the Mississippi River with the hope of finding a means of saving Dexter's life.

The boys take a boat down the river with a group of unkind adults who mistreat the pair. Eventually the boys steal their money and try to hitchhike the rest of the way. When the boatmen find out their money has been stolen, they locate the kids at a bus station and proceed to chase them until they reach a dead end of a dilapidated building. Erik draws a switchblade and one of the men draws a knife. Dexter suddenly grabs the knife from Erik and cuts his own hand. He threatens the boatman with his blood, saying that he has AIDS and could easily transfer the disease to him through the man's open wounds. This scares the men off. Dexter then realizes what he has done by directly exposing his blood to the outside environment. He suddenly feels sick, so Erik escorts him back to the bus station. Realizing that their journey must end if Dexter is to be treated, Erik resorts to calling Linda to have her pick the boys up when they reach Stillwater by bus.

Once they return, Dexter spends the rest of his time in the hospital. As his relationship with his mother has grown increasingly strained, Erik goes to stay with Linda who lets him visit Dexter. The boys joke and prank the doctors three times that Dexter has died, but when a third doctor arrives to check on him, Dexter has died for real. While driving Erik home, Linda notices a mother holding her young child while crossing the street. Reminded of her own son, she pulls over and breaks down crying. Erik apologizes to her, saying that he should have tried harder to find a cure. Linda, taken aback by his comment, embraces Erik, explaining that he was the happiest thing in Dexter's difficult life. Upon their arrival at home, a furious Gail confronts the pair. When Gail starts to hit Erik, Linda quickly intervenes, angrily and tearfully informs her of Dexter's death, and demands that she allow Erik to attend the funeral and never hit him again and threatens to kill her. Gail guiltily complies.

At Dexter's funeral, Erik places one of his shoes in the coffin and takes one of Dexter's to let sail down the river. This pays homage to an earlier moment in their trip when Dexter, who was having nightmares, was given one of Erik's sneakers to hold as a reminder that he's always by his side.

== Cast ==
- Joseph Mazzello as Dexter Evans
- Brad Renfro as Erik
- Diana Scarwid as Gail
- Bruce Davison as Dr. Stevens
- Annabella Sciorra as Linda Evans
- Nicky Katt as Pony
- Aeryk Egan as Tyler
- Renée Humphrey as Angle
- Peter Moore as Male Nurse
- Andrew Broder as Tyler's Friend #1
- Jeremy Howard as Tyler's Friend #2
- John Carroll Lynch as Skipper #1

== Production ==
=== Development ===
The script for the film was written in 1993 by Robert Kuhn. Although studio executives were initially skittish about the film's commercial prospects due to its subject matter, the script became a hot property when Steven Spielberg's production company Amblin Entertainment showed interest in buying it. A resulting bidding war ended with a million-dollar sale to Eric Eisner of Island Pictures.

Eisner sought out Martin Brest to direct the film, but Brest declined as he was unsure he could get the necessary performances out of young actors. Other directors who declined were Sydney Pollack, Rob Reiner and Paul Brickman. Universal Pictures, who had signed on to distribute the film, expressed concern that no director had yet come on board, so Eisner halved the film's initial $20 million budget and hired Peter Horton to direct.

While the script circulated through talent agencies for the casting process, some industry figures criticized the script's irresponsibility in its treatment of homosexuality and accused it of homophobia. Particular criticism was directed towards scenes in which neighborhood bullies insult Dexter, calling him gay slurs while no other characters attempt to neutralize the insults. Horton attempted to address this problem through the character of Jerry, a gay male nurse played by actor Peter Moore. Commenting on Jerry's character, journalist Jess Cagle opined, "Jerry's homosexuality is apparent only in a slight part of Moore's performance. The result is an effeminate character who is at best secretly gay, at worst an offensive stereotype."

=== Casting ===
Horton hoped to cast big stars to boost the film's box office returns and asked his ex-wife Michelle Pfeiffer and Meg Ryan to participate, both of whom declined. Horton was hesitant to work with children as he doubted the ability of young actors to express the emotional weight needed for the film, but was blown away by the auditions of both Joseph Mazzello and Brad Renfro. Mazzello had not met anyone with AIDS before, so Horton suggested he watch an HBO special about an Australian boy who died of the disease.

=== Filming ===
The film was shot over the summer of 1994 in Stillwater, Minnesota. Locations included the St. Croix River and Minnehaha Creek.

=== Soundtrack ===
The original soundtrack to the film was composed by Dave Grusin and released by GRP Records on May 9, 1995.

Tommy Morgan contributed to the musical harmony and Michael Fisher worked with percussion. The instruments used in the martial band of the track are: piano, electric bass, acoustic guitar, electric guitar, synthesizer, and alto flute. The song called "My Great Escape" was written and performed by Marc Cohn. However, this song has never been released in any medium outside of the film.

In a review for AllMusic, Jason Ankeny commented, "The music's gentle strings and playful woodwinds sweetly capture the innocence of childhood without trafficking in schmaltz...More important, he treats the film's subject matter...with admirable restraint, eschewing heart-tugging treacle in favor of light, organic melodies that celebrate life instead of mourning its loss."

== Reception ==
=== Box office ===
The Cure debuted in the number 13 spot in North American theaters and grossed $1.2 million during its opening weekend. Across 832 theaters in the US and Canada, the film's grosses totaled to $2,568,425. It performed better in Japan, grossing more than $4.5 million in its first three weeks of release with $1.73 million on opening weekend across 33 theatres.

=== Critical response ===
On the review aggregator website Rotten Tomatoes, 50% of 10 critics' reviews are positive. Audiences polled by CinemaScore gave the film an average grade of "A" on an A+ to F scale.

The performances of Renfro, Mazzello, and Sciorra were roundly praised. Lisa Schwarzbaum of Entertainment Weekly gave a positive review, stating "Mazzello is naturally captivating and Renfro especially, is a remarkably instinctive young actor...What makes us cry is not that Dexter has AIDS, but that Dexter and Erik have each other to the end, until death separates them. It is an odd feat to create a dramatic story that brings us to tears even without worrying about AIDS. 'The Cure' achieved this miracle." Peter Stack of The San Francisco Chronicle said Renfro and Mazzello's "performances are so warm and richly layered...in a loving, funny and wistful film that plays like a slightly torn Norman Rockwell illustration."

Kevin Thomas from the Los Angeles Times wrote, "[The film] works as a drama on friendship and its challenges" and commended Horton in drawing measured performances from his actors. Stephen Holden of The New York Times stated "it evokes with an intense clarity the particular blend of innocence, curiosity, terror and bravado that drives children to commit desperate acts."

Among the criticisms were that the film was predictable, implausible and manipulative. Thomas noted, "All told, 'The Cure' plays more like a movie made for TV than the big screen." Leonard Klady of Variety stated, "Director Peter Horton is more assured with his artists, particularly the central youngsters. The strength he brings to the material is in the development of their relationship," but lamented that "wholly preposterous plot turns take over, and [the] pic never recovers once the two boys decide to paddle down the Mississippi a la Huck Finn."

Another criticism was towards the film's softening of the physical ravages of AIDS, "[reducing] the symptoms to weakness, occasional fever and a few mild coughing fits." Schwarzbaum wrote, "A dying child is emotional blackmail; a child dying of AIDS is an emotional bludgeon, and a filmmaker would do well to keep the case very, very specific, rather than make the deterioration a poetic mystery."

Joey O'Bryan of The Austin Chronicle said, "There are some good, effective moments in The Cure, but far too often the film lapses into silly heart-tugging...[ultimately] the movie's good intentions are rarely realized, and the nice message of this family film (Kids with AIDS are people too!) is unfortunately delivered with a slight whiff of homophobia. Then subtract another half a star for the absurdly in-your-face Butterfinger product placement, and what you've got left is a competently acted, high concept, family entertainment, coming of age, AIDS tearjerker that occasionally doubles as a candy bar commercial."

=== Accolades ===
Award	Category	Nominee(s)	Result
Cinekid Festival	Audience Award	Peter Horton	Won
YoungStar Awards	Best Performance by a Young Actor in a Drama Film	Brad Renfro	Won
Grammy Awards	Best Instrumental Composition Written for a Motion Picture or for Television	Dave Grusin	Nominated
Young Artist Awards	Best Family Feature - Drama	The Cure	Nominated
Young Artist Awards	Best Young Leading Actor - Feature Film	Joseph Mazzello	Nominated
Young Artist Awards	Best Young Leading Actor - Feature Film	Brad Renfro	Nominated

== Home media ==
The Cure was released on VHS on October 24, 1995. It was then released on DVD on November 23, 2004 and also in Blu-ray on March 23, 2021, in Japan.

The film was released on Blu-ray in the United States via Mill Creek Entertainment, under their "Retro VHS Collection", on October 4, 2022.
