= Three Wishes (film) =

- Theatrical release poster
- Directed by: Martha Coolidge
- Screenplay by: Elizabeth Anderson
- Story by: Clifford Green; Ellen Green
- Produced by: Clifford Green; Ellen Green; Gary Lucchesi
- Starring: Patrick Swayze; Mary Elizabeth Mastrantonio; Joseph Mazzello; Seth Mumy; David Marshall Grant; Diane Venora; Michael O'Keefe
- Cinematography: Johnny E. Jensen
- Edited by: Steven Cohen
- Music by: Cynthia Millar
- Production company: Rysher Entertainment
- Distributed by: Savoy Pictures
- Release date: October 27, 1995 (United States)
- Running time: 115 minutes
- Country: United States
- Language: English
- Budget: $10 million
- Box office: $7,025,496

Three Wishes is a 1995 American fantasy drama film directed by Martha Coolidge and starring Patrick Swayze, Mary Elizabeth Mastrantonio and Joseph Mazzello.

Three Wishes was released by Savoy Pictures on October 27, 1995 in the United States. The film received negative reviews from critics, and grossed $7,025,496 against a $10 million budget.

== Plot ==
In the present, Tom Holman, a family man is beset with financial problems that make him emotionally distant from his family. While driving in his car with his wife and two daughters, he almost runs into a guy walking into a cemetery. Tom's vision of the man causes him to have a flashback to a similar incident in his early life.

In 1955, Jean Holman is a single mother caring for her two little boys, 11-year-old Tom and 5-year-old Gunny. Jean's husband is a soldier who was reported missing in action during the Korean War and is presumed dead. Tom, who deeply misses his father, feels left out of father-son activities (baseball and camping) in the community. Jean is concerned at Gunny's repeated complaints of stomach pains and his medical condition has gone undiagnosed. Further, while driving one day with Tom and Gunny, Jean accidentally runs into a drifter named Jack McCloud, breaking his leg. Feeling sorry for him, Jean invites Jack and his female dog Betty Jane to stay at her home until his leg has healed. After some initial difficulties in adapting to this new lifestyle, Jack soon finds himself loved by the family, who all want him to stay. Jack starts teaching baseball to Tom and the two of them develop a strong bond. Meanwhile, Gunny believes there is more to Jack and Betty Jane than meets the eye, and he is determined to find out what.

Gunny soon finds out Betty Jane is a genie, not merely a dog. Meanwhile, Jack's bond with the family gets closer and closer, and Tom comes to see Jack as a surrogate father. At the same time, Tom's baseball coach, Coach Schramka recognizes Jack as a former famous baseball player, who disappeared years ago during Second World War. Jack denies it. Phil sees Jack as a threat, a potential rival for the affections of Jean. Tom too comes to reject Jack after Jack decides to move away when he is healed, leaving Tom to feel abandoned by a father a second time. Jean also feels sad about Jack's decision but admits the impossibility of staying with Jack. After Jack says goodbye to Tom, Tom flees on his bike to a nearby hill. Suddenly, Tom changes his mind and heads back to the highway to find Jack getting into a truck before Tom can reach him.

On the 4th of July Party, the titular wishes are being fulfilled. Gunny realizes his wish to fly in the middle of the fireworks, unseen by the public congregated in the park. Tom's wish is fulfilled when his long-lost father is discovered alive, and he returns home after being freed from his imprisonment by the People's Republic of China.

Back to the present day, Tom enters the cemetery. Tom meets Jack again. He talks with Jack briefly, discovering that Jack's real wish wasn't that Tom's father would come back home, but that Tom would be happy with the family he had. Afterwards, Jack disappears, and a renewed Tom holds his wife close. Meanwhile, the camera focuses on a headstone that reveals Jack McCloud died on August 6, 1944.

== Cast ==
- Patrick Swayze as Jack McCloud
- Mary Elizabeth Mastrantonio as Jean Holman
- Joseph Mazzello as Tom Holman
  - Michael O'Keefe as Adult Tom Holman
- Seth Mumy as Gunny Holman
- Bill Mumy as Neighbor
- D. B. Sweeney (uncredited) as Jeffrey Holman
- David Marshall Grant as Phil
- Jay O. Sanders as Coach Schramka
- Diane Venora as Joyce
- Scott Patterson as Mr. Holman
- Neal McDonough as Policeman
- Jeff "Baby" Selman as a baseball player
- Jon "The Snake" Selman as worst baseball player

== Reception ==
On the review aggregator website Rotten Tomatoes, 13% of 15 critics' reviews are positive, with an average rating of 4.4/10.
