= The Client (1994 film) =

1994 film by Joel Schumacher

- Theatrical release poster
- Directed by: Joel Schumacher
- Screenplay by: Akiva Goldsman; Robert Getchell
- Based on: The Client by John Grisham
- Produced by: Arnon Milchan; Steven Reuther
- Starring: Susan Sarandon; Tommy Lee Jones; Brad Renfro; Mary-Louise Parker; Anthony LaPaglia; Anthony Edwards; Ossie Davis
- Cinematography: Tony Pierce-Roberts
- Edited by: Robert Brown
- Music by: Howard Shore
- Production companies: Regency Enterprises; Alcor Films
- Distributed by: Warner Bros.
- Release date: July 20, 1994
- Running time: 121 minutes
- Country: United States
- Language: English
- Budget: $45 million
- Box office: $117.6 million

The Client is a 1994 American Southern Gothic legal thriller film directed by Joel Schumacher, and starring Susan Sarandon, Tommy Lee Jones, Mary-Louise Parker, Anthony LaPaglia, Anthony Edwards, Ossie Davis, and introducing Brad Renfro in his film debut. It is based on the 1993 novel by John Grisham. It was filmed in Memphis, Tennessee.

The Client was theatrically released in the United States by Warner Bros. on July 20, 1994, and was a box-office hit, grossing $117.6 million against a $45 million budget. It received positive reviews from critics, with the performances of Sarandon, Jones and Renfro in particular earning high praise.

== Plot ==
Eleven-year-old Mark Sway and his little brother Ricky are smoking cigarettes in the woods near their Memphis trailer home when they encounter mob lawyer W. Jerome Clifford attempting suicide. Mark sneaks up to the back of Clifford's car to remove a hose from the exhaust pipe, which is funnelling carbon monoxide into the car.

Clifford discovers Mark and pulls him into the car to die with him. He tells the boy that he is about to kill himself to avoid being murdered by Barry "The Blade" Muldano, the nephew of notorious mob kingpin Johnny Sulari. Mark grabs a gun from the car seat, but Clifford takes it away from him. As he shoots the car window, Mark manages to escape with Ricky. Clifford chases them but stops at a cliff, puts the gun in his mouth, and pulls the trigger.

Ricky becomes catatonic after witnessing the suicide and is hospitalized at Saint Peter Charity Hospital. There, Mark sees the news of the incident on TV and starts shaking. Authorities – and the mob – realize that Clifford may have told Mark where Louisiana Senator Boyd Boyette, murdered by Muldano, is buried.

Mark meets Regina "Reggie" Love, a lawyer and recovering alcoholic, who agrees to represent him. They quickly run afoul of "Reverend" Roy Foltrigg, a celebrated and vain US Attorney who is using the case as a springboard for his political ambitions.

In the meantime, it is revealed that Sulari never authorized Muldano to kill the senator. Therefore, Sulari wants him to uncover how much Mark knows. Muldano is also ordered to move the senator's body, but he is unable to do so because it is buried in Clifford's boathouse and police are still on the property investigating the suicide.

Foltrigg continues to use legal tactics in an attempt to pressure Mark into revealing where the body is hidden. Sulari orders Muldano to kill the children and Reggie. He also orders the body to be moved once the investigation at Clifford's home is concluded. After Mark is threatened in a hospital elevator by Mafia member Paul Gronke, he is unable to talk to Foltrigg.

Mark and Reggie go to New Orleans to confirm that the body is on Clifford's property. Reggie intends to use this information to broker a deal with Foltrigg to get Ricky specialized medical care and place the family in the witness protection program. Reggie and Mark arrive at Clifford's house the same night as Muldano and his accomplices, who are in the process of digging up the body. A chaotic confrontation ensues when Mark and Reggie are discovered, but Muldano and his men quickly flee after Reggie triggers the neighbors' alarm. Foltrigg agrees to Reggie's demands in exchange for information about the body's location. Before the Sway family leaves to restart their lives under new identities, Mark and Reggie share a heartfelt goodbye.

While Muldano gets angry at his fellow mob members for messing up, Sulari becomes fed up with Muldano and sends him off to be killed. With the senator's body recovered, Foltrigg is a shoo-in for the media headlines he craves. He mentions that he intends to run for governor.

== Cast ==
- Susan Sarandon as Regina "Reggie" Love
- Tommy Lee Jones as U.S. Attorney Roy "Reverend Roy" Foltrigg
- Brad Renfro as Marcus "Mark" Sway
- Mary-Louise Parker as Dianne Sway
- Anthony LaPaglia as Barry "The Blade" Muldano
- J. T. Walsh as FBI Special Agent Jason McThune
- Anthony Edwards as Clint Von Hooser
- Ossie Davis as Judge Harry Roosevelt
- Will Patton as Sergeant Hardy
- Bradley Whitford as Assistant U.S. Attorney Thomas Fink
- Anthony Heald as FBI Agent Larry Trumann
- Kim Coates as Paul Gronke
- William H. Macy as Dr. Greenway
- Micole Mercurio as Momma Love
- David Speck as Richard "Ricky" Sway
- Kimberly Scott as Guard Doreen
- John Diehl as Jack Nance
- William Richert as Harry "Mac" Bono
- Ron Dean as Johnny "Uncle Johnny" Sulari
- William Sanderson as FBI Agent Wally Boxx
- Andy Stahl as FBI Agent Scheff
- Nat Robinson as FBI Agent Boch
- Tommy Cresswell as FBI Agent #3
- Walter Olkewicz as Jerome "Romey" Clifford
- Mark Cabus as Detective Nasser
- Dan Castellaneta as "Slick" Moeller
- Amy Hathaway as Karen
- Jo Harvey Allen as Claudette
- Will Zahrn as Gill Beale
- Macon McCalman as Ballatine
- John Fink as Lieutenant
- George Klein as Announcer

== Production ==
Joel Schumacher did not want a child actor for the role of Mark Sway, looking for a real kid with a real accent to do the role. 6,000 actors auditioned for the role before Brad Renfro was cast.

== Reception ==
=== Box office ===
The Client was a financial success, earning $92,115,211 at the North American domestic box office and an additional $25,500,000 internationally, for a worldwide total of $117,615,211.

=== Critical response ===
The Client received generally positive reviews. Rotten Tomatoes gave the film a score of 78% from 40 reviews. The site's consensus states: "The Client may not reinvent the tenets of the legal drama, but Joel Schumacher's sturdy directorial hand and a high-caliber cast bring John Grisham's page-turner to life with engrossing suspense." The film received a 65 rating on Metacritic. Audiences surveyed by CinemaScore gave the film a grade of "B+" on scale of A+ to F.

Roger Ebert gave the film two and a half out of four stars, and The New York Times called The Client a film "with a fast, no-nonsense pace and three winning performances...that most clearly echoes the simple, vigorous Grisham style".

=== Year-end lists ===
- 4th – Mack Bates, The Milwaukee Journal

=== Awards and honors ===
For her work in the film, Susan Sarandon was nominated for an Academy Award for Best Actress at the 67th Academy Awards and won a BAFTA Award for Best Actress in a Leading Role at the 48th British Academy Film Awards. For his work in the film, Renfro won a Young Artist Award for Best Leading Young Actor in a Feature Film at the 16th Youth in Film Awards and was nominated for a Chicago Film Critics Association Award for Most Promising Actor.

== Home media ==
The film was released on VHS and Laserdisc in 1994. It was released on DVD on December 17, 1997, and also on Blu-ray on November 6, 2012.

== Adaptations ==
The film spawned a TV series of the same name, starring JoBeth Williams and John Heard, while Ossie Davis reprises his role of Judge Harry Roosevelt. The show lasted one season (1995–1996).

== See also ==
- Trial film

== Notes ==
a. Spelled "Muldanno" in the original novel.
