= Holy Ghost People =

Holy Ghost People may refer to:

- Holy Ghost People (1967 film), a documentary by Peter Adair
- Holy Ghost People (2013 film), a film by Mitchell Altieri partially inspired by Adair's documentary film
