= Joe Egender =

American actor

- Born: 1976 or 1977 (age 48–49); Kansas City, Missouri, US
- Occupations: Actor; producer; screenwriter

Joe Egender (born 1976/77), is an American actor, producer, and screenwriter. He is best known for his collaborations with The Butcher Brothers, Holy Ghost People, and his television roles.

== Career ==
=== Film ===
Egender has made several films with The Butcher Brothers (Mitchell Altieri and Phil Flores). Their first collaboration was Lurking in Suburbia (2004); Don R. Lewis of Film Threat wrote of Egender's starring performance, "He reminds me of a less whiny Giovanni Ribisi and, mark my words, this performance will gain him some big roles." Egender had a cameo in their next film, The Hamiltons (2006), and a larger supporting role in The Violent Kind (2010). Scott Beggs of Film School Rejects called the performance "...a hell of a lot of fun... frenetic and interesting", and Matt Glasby of Total Film called it "gobsmacking overacting". Egender produced, co-wrote, and co-starred in Altieri's Holy Ghost People (2013). Egender said that he enjoyed the greater control over the film, which heightened his performance. Scott Weinberg of Fearnet wrote that Egender "steals numerous scenes". Besides his collaborations with Altieri and Flores, he also starred in Hunger (2009). In a negative review, Bill Gibron of DVD Talk called Egender's character deeply annoying but possibly a good performance if that were the intent. He had a supporting role in The Frankenstein Theory (2013). Describing Egender's performance, Truly Disturbing said Egender "makes a hairpin turn from being funny and kind of silly to being harrowing in an organic way". Patrick Naugle of DVD Verdict called his character an out-of-place "supporting character in a Jim Carrey film." In 2015, he co-starred in the horror-thriller film The Diabolical and starred in I Remember You.

=== Television ===
On television, Egender has starred in the TV film To My Future Assistant (2013) and was cast in a co-starring role in the miniseries Texas Rising (2015). He also had guest appearances on Alcatraz (2012) and American Horror Story: Asylum (2012). He was also in an episode of Hawaii Five-0 (2016). Egender is a co-creator of the 2019 Netflix TV documentary miniseries, Unnatural Selection.

=== Theater ===
In 2008, he starred in the play He Asked for It, a gay-themed story about AIDS. His performance brought best actor nominations from the Ovation Awards and Los Angeles Drama Critics Circle.

=== Other work ===
In the video game Dead Rising 3, Egender appears as Stitch.

== Personal life ==
Egender is from Kansas City, Missouri. He currently resides in Los Angeles, California. He volunteers for the Big Brothers Big Sisters of America.
