= Mackenzie Firgens =

American actress

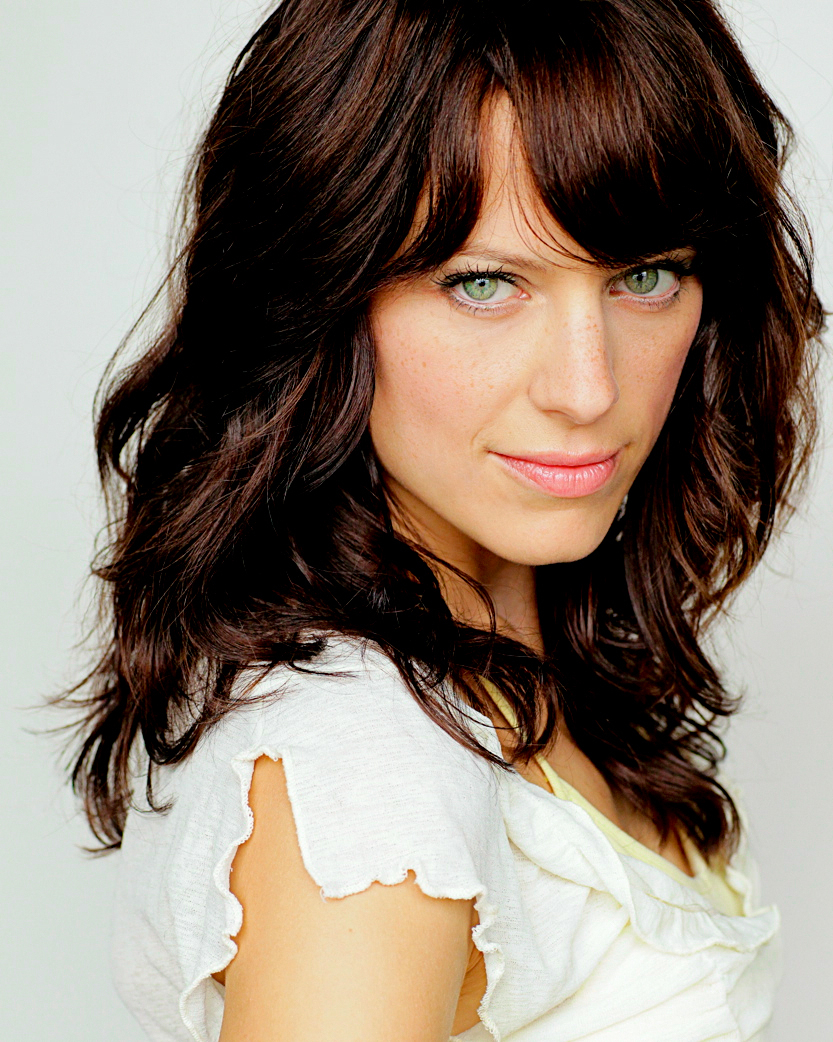
- Occupation: Actress
- Years active: 2000–present

Mackenzie Firgens is an American actress.

== Biography ==
Firgens made her feature film debut starring as Harmony in the underground hit Groove. Firgens played the role of April in the film version of the Broadway sensation Rent.

Firgens also starred in Quality of Life and appeared on the films Broken Arrows, Break, My Name Is Khan, and The Thompsons.

== Filmography ==
=== Film ===
Year	Title	Role	Notes
2000	Groove	Harmony Stitts	
2003	Cupids	Susan	Short film
2004	Quality of Life	Lisa	
2004	Life at Bay	Jenna	Short film
2005	Rent	April Ericsson	
2006	Sweet Insanity	Christina	
2006	Filter	Charlie Stokes	Short film
2006	Nail Polish	Missy	
2006	The Hamiltons	Darlene Hamilton	
2006	Carrier	Suzie	
2007	Broken Arrows	Abby	
2007	Revolution Summer	Hope	
2007	The Pink Conspiracy	Victoria	
2007	'Call My Name	Constance Summer Holiday	Short film
2008	The Book of Caleb	Cole	
2008	The Village Barbershop	Amy	
2008	Break	The Mysterious Brunette	
2008	Alien Encounter	Ashley	
2009	In Parallel	Angela	Short film
2010	Gerald	Helen	
2010	The Violent Kind	Trixie	
2012	Stitch in Time	Sunny	
2012	The Thompsons	Darlene Hamilton-Thompson	
2014	Preston Castle	Liz	
2015	Unlucky Stars	Samantha	
2016	My Movie Girl	Vivian	

=== Television ===
Year	Title	Role	Notes
2003	America's Most Wanted: America Fights Back	Kiara	Episode: "Dino and Troy Smith"
2008	James Gunn's PG Porn	Violet	Episodes: "Peanus", "A Very Peanus Christmas"
2008	Humanzee!	Penny	Episode: "Pilot"
2009	CSI: NY	Nurse	Episode: "Help"

== Awards ==
Firgens was nominated for the Best Actress award at the Down Beach Film Festival for her role as Helen in the film Gerald.
