= Greg Harrison =

American film director and editor (born 1969)

Greg Harrison (born May 4, 1969, in Michigan) is an American film director and editor.

He graduated from Michigan State University where he got his early film experience with MSU Telecasters.

He has directed films such as Groove (2000) and November (2004), both of which were produced by Danielle Renfrew.
