= Lurk =

Lurk, lurker, or lurking may refer to:

- Lurker, a person who often reads discussions on internet networks, but rarely contributes to them.
- Lurk, a single long pole held with both hands, used in telemark skiing
- Lurking variable, or a confounding variable, in statistics
- Lorelei, nicknamed "Lurking Rock", a rock on the eastern bank of the Rhine River near St. Goarshausen, Germany

== Entertainment ==
- The Lurker, 2019 American horror film
- Lurker (film), 2025 American psychological thriller film
- The Lurkers, 1970s English punk rock group
- Lurk (Dungeons & Dragons)
- Lurk, another name for a vampire in the Buffy the Vampire Slayer spin-off comic Fray
- Lurk, a character in the 1972 British comedy film Up the Front
- Lurk, another name for a myrddraal, a fictional shadowspawn species in the Wheel of Time series
- Lurk (TV series), 2009 Chinese TV series
- Lurking Unknown, a fictional Marvel Comics character
- The Lurkers, a 2004-2005 IDW Publishing comics series

== See also ==
- The Lurking Fear, a 1923 horror fiction short story by H. P. Lovecraft
- Lurking in Suburbia, a 2006 comedy film
- Idle (disambiguation)
