= November (2004 film) =

- Theatrical release poster
- Directed by: Greg Harrison
- Written by: Benjamin Brand; Greg Harrison
- Produced by: Jake Abraham; Danielle Renfrew; Gary Winick
- Starring: Courteney Cox
- Cinematography: Nancy Schreiber
- Edited by: Greg Harrison
- Music by: Lew Baldwin
- Production company: IFC Productions
- Distributed by: Sony Pictures Classics
- Release dates: January 18, 2004 (Sundance); July 22, 2005 (United States)
- Running time: 73 minutes
- Country: United States
- Language: English
- Budget: $1.5 million
- Box office: $192,186

November is a 2004 American psychological thriller film premiered at the 2004 Sundance Film Festival. It follows a photographer (Courteney Cox) whose life begins to unravel following a traumatic incident on November 7 that involved her boyfriend (James LeGros). The film co-stars Michael Ealy, Nora Dunn, Anne Archer, Nick Offerman and Matthew Carey.

The low-budget independent film was directed by Greg Harrison, written by Benjamin Brand and Harrison, and produced by Danielle Renfrew and Gary Winick. Sony Pictures Classics released it to theaters in the United States on July 22, 2005, and while its award-winning digital video photography was praised, many reviews criticized the film's story for being too ambiguous and derivative of other films. Critics have compared it to the work of filmmakers such as David Lynch and M. Night Shyamalan.

== Plot ==
On the evening of November 7, photographer Sophie Jacobs and her attorney boyfriend Hugh go to dinner at a Chinese restaurant. As they travel home afterward, Sophie develops a craving for "something sweet" and stops their car at a convenience store. While Hugh is in the store buying some chocolate for Sophie, an armed man arrives and holds up the store, shooting the store clerk, his son, and Hugh dead. He runs away as Sophie arrives.

Sophie sinks into a deep depression, and cannot bring herself to erase Hugh's voice from their apartment's answering machine. She consults her psychiatrist, Dr. Fayn, about persistent headaches that she has been suffering from since his death. She tells Dr. Fayn that the headaches started to occur before the incident at the convenience store, and that she had been having an affair with a co-worker, Jesse. After Hugh's death Sophie has dinner with her mother, Carol Jacobs, who accidentally knocks a glass over.

During a college photography class that she teaches, Sophie sets up a slide projector for the students to showcase their best photographs. One slide in the slide show depicts the exterior of the convenience store on the evening of November 7. Sophie contacts Officer Roberts, the head of the investigation into the shootings at the convenience store, who is as puzzled as she is as to who is responsible for the photos. Sophie's headaches continue, and she begins to hear strange noises coming from within her apartment building and mysterious voices on the phone. Later, Officer Roberts discovers that the photo of the convenience store was paid for with Sophie's credit card.

The film presents two more different versions of these events, and Sophie must figure out which is real before she loses grip on her sanity, and her life. The second version suggests that Sophie was present at the shootings and was only spared because the shooter ran out of bullets, and the third suggests both Sophie and Hugh were killed. In the words of Cox, her character "goes through three phases. First there's denial. Then she feels guilty and sad about the situation. Then she has to learn to accept it." According to Greg Harrison, the events in the film were Sophie's memories as she and Hugh lay dying on the floor of the convenience store: "Each movement of this memory was her process of coming to terms with the terrible trauma, which was that she was killed for absolutely no reason, and it was some random act of violence she couldn’t confront". He added he felt November was "open-ended" enough that he hoped viewers would "come up with the most beautiful stories themselves that are very different from how I saw it."

== Cast ==
- Courteney Cox as Sophie Jacobs
- James LeGros as Hugh
- Michael Ealy as Jesse
- Nora Dunn as Dr. Fayn
- Anne Archer as Carol Jacobs
- Nick Offerman as Officer Roberts
- Matthew Carey as Shooter

== Development ==
The film's script was written by Benjamin Brand, who had written and sold several unproduced screenplays to studios. Brand had served as an assistant to producer Danielle Renfrew on the film Groove (2000), which was directed by Greg Harrison. Brand, Renfrew and Harrison were friends and living in their hometown of San Francisco developing separate projects at "Major film studios#Mini-majors" studios which, according to Renfrew, were "wallowing in development hell". Brand saw a news story about a store robbery in which the robber had hidden the body of the cashier behind the counter and then impersonated the cashier as customers came in. Drawing from this story as well as from experiences in his own life (he had previously taught photography at the Academy of Art), Brand wrote a screenplay and presented it to Renfrew and Harrison. Both were impressed, and Harrison said it was "fascinating ... kind of an abstract exercise in narrative, which I thought was exciting and bold".

Brand and Harrison worked through several drafts of the script over the following six months. Harrison, who cited the death of a close friend as one of his personal inspirations for the film, focused on inserting more emotional elements into the script; in his words they were "trying to express the subjective experience of trauma". Once a draft was completed, the group began pitching the project to various production companies. Renfrew consciously chose to avoid taking the project to major Hollywood studios such as 20th Century Fox or Warner Bros. and instead opted for "smaller companies who were interested in doing something off of center". A breakthrough was achieved after a meeting with director Gary Winick, who had established a company in New York City called InDigEnt. The company specialized in backing low-budget films shot on digital video such as Personal Velocity (2002), Tadpole (2002) and Pieces of April (2003). Greg Harrison's debut film Groove had impressed executives at the company, and John Sloss of Cinetic Media said, "November is exactly the kind of sharp and invigorating material that has made InDigEnt what it is".

Before the development of the film, Harrison had cast actress Courteney Cox in a Garry Trudeau-scripted ensemble film being developed at Fox Searchlight. Cox was a comic actress widely known for her role on the television sitcom Friends and had participated in only a handful of more serious productions. While the Garry Trudeau project was intended as a comedy, Harrison said he felt Cox was "very capable of drama and was very willing and wanted to transcend her comedic persona". When the Trudeau project did not enter production, Harrison offered Cox the lead role for November without an audition: "Courteney's biggest challenge is redefining herself ... I knew I could bring something out of her that people haven't seen before", he said. Cox, who said she is more similar to her character in November than her Friends character, Monica Geller, said, "I wanted to make November because it's fascinating, confusing, ambiguous, eerie and makes you think. There aren't that many movies where you leave the theater and want to talk about them". She added, "it was trying to take you through a woman's experience of tragedy and through all the stages. I loved that".

== Filming ==
Harrison, Brand and Renfrew intended the film to be set and shot in San Francisco, but problems arose with their proposal. Cox had a commitment to Friends, which was in production in Los Angeles, and the film's production costs did not allow the entire production team to relocate to northern California for the duration for the shoot. The filmmakers were forced to shoot in Los Angeles, but Renfrew later expressed no regret in their decision: "We wanted the story to take place in an anonymous urban area. And I think we were successful in doing that".

Production finally began on May 19, 2003, and took place on Cox's days off from her Friends shooting schedule. Renfrew's Los Angeles home stood in for the apartment of Cox's character in the film. The budget did not allow the luxury of trailers, but with some persuading, neighbouring apartments were converted into staging areas. For her role Cox donned glasses with thick frames, and had her hair cut by seven inches and a grey streak dyed into it. Harrison said, "She's seen in the fashion world as glamorous, a pop icon from Friends, so how to dress her down, and also make her body feel different. I had her wear those clothes around the house to feel like a different person".

Smoke was pumped across the set to help create a blue color cast for scenes in the film's first act

The film's cinematographer was Nancy Schreiber, who had never before shot a film on Mini-DV. Harrison intended the shifts between chapters of the film—and Sophie's emotions—to be signalled visually, and he instructed Schreiber to employ different colour casts accordingly. For the opening robbery scenes (which recur throughout the film), Schreiber purchased two Panasonic AG-DVX100 cameras with white balance and color temperature controls. She used them with lighting gels and sodium street lamps that surrounded the real-life convenience store where the crew was shooting to make the image appear green. A similar process was used in the second movement of the narrative, which was bathed in orange to represent Sophie's despair, while white expressed "acceptance" in the film's third and final act. To help achieve a blue colour cast for the first phase of the film ("denial"), Schreiber surrounded the shooting locations with machines that pumped smoke across the set. Cinematographer and Sundance Film Festival judge Frederick Elmes commented of Schreiber's work, "She lit it and used colors in a way that the camera responded. And I don't think that's the kind of thing you do by accident. That's completely designed".

Harrison applauded the speed of Mini-DV for allowing such a short shoot: "We could shoot with multiple cameras at times, which helped us in our schedule". He also cited the advantages Mini-DV had in post-production, estimating that 75%–80% of the visual and sound design processing had been performed on desktop computers. November was shot in fifteen days on a budget of $150,000, and post-production costs were the same – a typical production model for films produced by InDiGent. Of the tight schedule and production costs, Harrison said, "I don't recommend shooting a movie that way and I don't want to do it again to be honest. It's really, really taxing".

Once shooting had wrapped, Harrison entered the editing room and constructed the film over the course of eighteen weeks, occasionally consulting colleagues such as Sarah Flack (editor of The Limey and Lost In Translation). Harrison, who had started out in the film industry as an editor, noted the strong involvement of key creative personnel throughout the pre-production, production and post-production stages, and called it "kind of a more holistic approach to post-production". He described the experience of editing the film alone (for the most part) as "brutal" and "exhausting", but he said he was satisfied with his work nonetheless. When asked about the film's seventy-three-minute running time, Renfrew said that Harrison "let the story and the film dictate the length as opposed to trying to force it to be any particular length".

== Release ==
November screened as an official selection at the 2004 Sundance Film Festival on January 18, 2004. Reviews of the Sundance screening were generally positive, with Guylaine Cadorette of Hollywood.com saying the film was "sure to garner buzz" outside of the fest, and Variety's Todd McCarthy writing that the film was "a stylistic tour de force dedicated more to constructing a cinematic puzzle than to providing dramatic satisfaction". Producers were reluctant to sell the picture to a distributor quickly, and gossip blogger Roger Friedman of Fox News commented that they "may have overplayed their hand in juggling offers".

The film was sold later that year to Sony Pictures Classics, which had handled Groove. The film’s theatrical release date was moved to the following summer after Courteney Cox, who was then pregnant, gave birth to her first child. In the meantime, the film was screened outside the United States at the Oslo International Film Festival on November 20, 2004.

On April 26, 2005, the film was screened at the San Francisco International Film Festival, whose organisers described it as an "homage to the mindbending thrillers of David Lynch ... Inspired by the perception-versus-reality mindgames of Mulholland Drive and the eerie psychological aesthetic of Nicolas Roeg's Don't Look Now". Audience response at its screening at the festival was generally positive, but critic Brandon Judell dismissed the film as "highly irritating and nonsensical," while Joanne Bealy said it was "a Mulholland Drive / David Lynch copycat ... even at 88 minutes, it was too long for me." The film screened at the Seattle International Film Festival on May 31, 2005 and the Los Angeles Film Festival on June 22, 2005.

== Reception ==
=== Box office ===
In its first weekend of release in the United States, November grossed $21,813 at eight theatres, and it debuted at number sixty-three on the box office chart. It peaked at number fifty-nine in its second weekend (aided by its expansion into nine more theatres) and generated $192,186 in ticket sales over twelve weeks. It was originally slated to enter wide release in late summer, but Sony Pictures Classics chose to expand the film into no more than 27 theaters (in its sixth week).

=== Critical response ===
Critical reviews of November were lukewarm. Greg Bellavia of Film Threat described the film as "Run Lola Run meets Pi with a splash of Seven ... As a thriller it seems awfully familiar and has trouble establishing a voice all its own", but added "Harrison and company manage to create one of the strangest romantic films out there and for their attempt at the offbeat deserve to be recognized." The New York Daily News was more negative in its summary of the film, labelling it a "convoluted and unsatisfying psychological drama." Mark Holcomb of The Village Voice said the film was "less compelling the more apparent its solution becomes. But before the foregone conclusion surfaces about halfway through, its disparate, unnerving components are mesmerizing." F. X. Feeney of the LA Weekly wrote, "it never becomes a mystery, like, say, Mulholland Drive, or even The Sixth Sense (despite the gimmicky magnitude of its final reveal)". while the Seattle Post-Intelligencer called it "a low-watt reworking of M. Night Shyamalan and David Lynch."

Scott Tobias of The A.V. Club wrote, "with each successive trip back to the scene, things only become murkier and less compelling, lost in pretentious symbolism and obvious visual signposts". Michael Sragow of the Baltimore Sun made a similar criticism, saying, "Benjamin Brand's script is a puzzle without a satisfying solution." Chicago Sun-Times critic Roger Ebert, who drew comparisons between the film's narrative and Elisabeth Kübler-Ross's five stages of dying model, argued "answers would be beside the point. Any other explanation, for example a speech by the psychiatrist or the cop explaining exactly what has really happened, would be contrivance. Better to allow November to descend into confusion and despair ... [it] does not bargain and does not explain." In Entertainment Weekly, Lisa Schwarzbaum identified the film as "an homage to the work of David Hockney: Just as Hockney assembles smaller, overlapped Polaroids that don't necessarily make sense into a big picture that does".

Marc Mohan of The Oregonian dismissed the film as "a post-Memento, mess-with-your-head thriller that thinks it's much cleverer than it is", but commented that Courteney Cox "doesn't embarrass herself" in her role, while The Hollywood Reporter felt that she was "as convincing as she could possibly be." Mark Holcomb, however, said Cox's demeanor "suggests impatience rather than depression," and F. X. Feeney thought "Cox’s performance is too muted to vitally illuminate this woman’s agony". Others such as Walter Addiego of the San Francisco Chronicle believed the film was a conscious decision on Cox's part to "establish movie credibility after the megasuccess of Friends".

Most praise in reviews was directed towards cinematographer Nancy Schreiber's work on the film. Tobias said the film "makes the most of its visual limitations", and Marc Savlov of the Austin Chronicle commented that it was "soaked to its noirish core in some fine cinematography." Kirk Honeycutt cited Schreiber as "the movie's real heroine, as she dramatically meshes the real with the surreal, creating different looks and emotions for each segment through light and color," while Jack Mathews wrote, "I suspect that it was her work—perhaps alone—that changed "November's" fate from a direct-to-video release to a brief first run in theaters."

On review aggregate website Rotten Tomatoes, November has an approval rating of 32% based on 79 reviews. The site’s critics consensus reads, "Murky and too artsy for its own good, November ends up being a case of style with little substance. On Metacritic, the film has a weighted average of 47 based on 26 reviews, indicating "mixed or average reviews".

== Awards and nominations ==
At the 2004 Sundance Film Festival, Nancy Schreiber won the award for Dramatic Excellence in Cinematography. Schreiber said the win was "quite a shock, since it was on mini-dv and we were up against films shot on film". Danielle Renfrew was nominated for the Producers Award at the 2004 Independent Spirit Awards for her work on November and Groove.
