= Quality of life (disambiguation) =

Quality of life is the degree to which an individual is healthy, comfortable, and able to participate in or enjoy life events.

Quality of Life may also refer to:

- Quality of life (healthcare), a measure of the overall effect of medical issues on a patient
- Quality of Life (film), a 2004 drama starring Lane Garrison
- "The Quality of Life" (Star Trek: The Next Generation), a TV episode
- "The Quality of Life" (Yes Minister), a TV episode
- "Quality of Life" (Billions), a TV episode
- "Quality of Life" (The Dead Zone), a TV episode
- The Quality of Life, a 2008 TV movie following the series Da Vinci's Inquest and Da Vinci's City Hall
- The Quality of Life, a 2007 play by Jane Anderson
- Quality of life (video games) (often abbreviated as QoL), features in a video game designed to make a game easier or smoother to play

== See also ==
- Quality-of-Life Index, a socioeconomic indicator created by the Economist Intelligence Unit
