= The Rage of the Stage Players =

American theatre group

The Rage of the Stage Players is an alternative, fringe theatre group based in south western Pennsylvania, USA. The group specializes in staging plays with mature themes.

== History ==
The Rage of the Stage Players was founded in 2001 by playwright James Michael Shoberg and wife Carrie L. Shoberg. The company has produced original plays based on familiar children's stories, legends and fairy tales, such as "Alice's Adventures in Wonderland", "Dracula", "Dorothy in Oz", "The Picture of Dorian Gray" and a stage adaptation of The Butcher Brothers movie, The Hamiltons.

In 2006, J.P. Patrick was awarded Best Actor for his performance in "The Hideous Face of Love", a play produced by The Rage of the Stage Players as part of the Pittsburgh New Works Festival.

In addition to the Shoberg’s, David Wooddell acts as a board member and their Marketing Director.
