= Luis Saguar =

American writer, professor and actor (1957-2009)

- Born: October 6, 1957; San Francisco, California, U.S
- Died: July 8, 2009 (aged 51); Daly City, California, U.S.
- Occupation: Actor
- Years active: 1991-2009
- Spouse: Nancy Landolina Saguar

Luis Saguar (October 6, 1957 – July 8, 2009) was an American writer, professor and actor in theater and films. Saguar played characters as diverse as wise elders, terrifying addicts, and strange sidekicks. He was also co-founder of Campo Santo, the theater company at the Intersection for the Arts. He is especially known for his work in 8mm, Fun with Dick and Jane and Flawless films, and his theater work in "Santos & Santos" (work directed by Octavio Solis), playing one of the corrupt lawyer brothers.

== Biography ==
Saguar was born in San Francisco, California, and was raised in Daly City, California. He had three siblings: Pablo Saguar, Frank Arambarri and Gloria Flore. During his adolescence, Saguar began using drugs, and at 15 was jailed for participating in a robbery. He turned his life around when he began his acting career at almost 30. In 2001, he published his work "Angulo Hotel", in which he spoke of living on the streets and explaining the risks of drugs and crime.

He played many different roles in theater, among which highlight their works in Shakespeare and Sartre. He acted on many stages in the Bay Area, Magic Theatre, American Conservatory Theater, Theatreworks USA, and ELTeatro Campesino. He also participated in 20 films (among them The Zodiac, and Fun with Dick and Jane), and many TV shows (among them The Shield, Nash Bridges and Midnight Caller). Saguar died on July 8, 2009, at Seton Medical Center in Daly City, at the age of 51.

== Personal life ==
He married Nancy Landolina and they had an only child, a daughter named Carmela.

== Filmography ==
=== Films ===
- 1999: 8mm - Manny
- 1999: Flawless - Mr. Z
- 2001: Echos of Enlightenment - Rabbi Don Carlos White Wolf
- 2002: The Three-Cornered Hat (Short) - Pirate
- 2004: Quality of Life - Pops
- 2004: Happily Even After - Casper
- 2004: Silver City - Vince Esparza
- 2005: Tweek City - Chucho
- 2005: The Zodiac - Sammy Karzoso (as Luis Sagua)
- 2005: Fun with Dick and Jane - Hector
- 2006: Read You Like a Book
- 2007: Coyote and the Ten Gallon Hat (Short) - Miguel
- 2008: Bottle Shock - Man #1 (as Louis Saguar)
- 2008: Pig Hunt - T.J.
- 2009: Everything Strange and New - Manny
- 2009: Night Fliers - Mr. Jordan
- 2009: The Mercy Man - Tattooed Guard
- 2011: Political Animals - Pedro

=== TV ===
- 1991: Midnight Caller - "Uninvited Guests" episode (1991): as Felipe Salazar
- 1992: America's Most Wanted - Stabler's Accomplice (segment "William Stabler Jr.") - Folsom Prison (1992): as Stabler's Accomplice (segment "William Stabler Jr.")
- 1996: Dalva
- 1996: Grand Avenue (TV film) - as a Bartender
- 1996-1999: Nash Bridges - "Smash and Grab" episode (1999): Lou Ortiz; "Apocalypse Nash" episode (1998): Enrique Piedra; "Hit Parade" episode (1996): as Frank LaPlante
- 2002: The Shield - "Two Days of Blood" episode (2002): as Pazi Arambula
- 2004: Karen Sisco - "He Was a Friend of Mine" episode (2004): as Cano
- 2006: The Evidence - "Pilot" (2006): as a hippie vendor
- 2006: Nip/Tuck - "Merrill Bobolit" (2006) ... as the Federal Correction Officer #1
- 2007: Day Break - "What If It's Him?" (2007) and "What If He's Free?" (2007)

=== Video game ===
- 1996: The Crystal Skull
