= In Search of Lovecraft =

- Directed by: David J. Hohl
- Written by: David J. Hohl
- Produced by: David J. Hohl; Michael Rosen
- Starring: Denise Amrikhas; Tytus Bergstrom; Jeff De Lucio-Brock
- Cinematography: Michael Rosen
- Edited by: David J. Hohl; Greg Whitlow
- Music by: Troy Sterling Nies
- Production company: HohloGraphic Productions
- Distributed by: Maxim Media International
- Release date: 2008
- Running time: 94 minutes
- Country: United States
- Language: English

In Search of Lovecraft is a 2008 American horror film that was directed and written by David J. Hohl. The film stars Renee Sweet as an unfulfilled reporter that comes face to face with nightmares from early 20th-century horror writer H. P. Lovecraft's work. It premiered at the 2008 H. P. Lovecraft Film Festival.

== Plot ==
The film is told through the perspective of Rebecca Marsh (Renee Sweet) a young reporter, dissatisfied with the boredom of her current occupation, who is sent to conduct a special Halloween program dedicated to H.P. Lovecraft, renowned horror writer, and worldbuilder. In her search, she discovers that not everyone believes his works are fiction, but instead that they are derived from prophetic dreams. These dreams provide insight into a superconscious resource, the akashic records, providing knowledge beyond his own experience. Rebecca's personality is initially skeptical, however, she and her assistant, Amber (Denise Amrikhas), find their beliefs are challenged when their lives are in danger. They discover that the various creatures, societies, and gods featured in Lovecraft's short stories do exist, and are now actively pursuing the two of them.

Rebecca and her crew enlist the help of an expert in the occult, Dr.D’Souza, who guides them as their discoveries lead the cult to mobilize against them. Eventually, as the cult becomes more active, D’Souza deems it necessary to call for the help of a witch, Keja. Both Dr.D’Souza and Keja assist them in fighting the forces of evil, who begin to pick off the crew one by one.

The cult are revealed to be minions of the Dark God Nyarlathotep, and are attempting to summon him into the real world. To defeat Nyarlathotep, Rebecca must discover the secret of The Haunter Of The Dark and obtain the Sacred Black Stone. By the end of the film, Rebecca is the sole survivor and her experience leaves her in an asylum.

== Cast ==
- Renee Sweet as Rebecca Marsh
- Denise Amrikhas as Amber Martin
- Tytus Bergstrom as Mike
- John D. Edge as Nyarlathotep
- Tony Grat as Hillbilly
- Noel Harris as News Editor
- Larry Laverty as Professor Sutton
- Saqib Mausoof as Dr. D'Souza
- Sue Ramsey as Sara
- Michael Andrew Reed as Homeless Bum
- Rachael Robbins as Keja
- Bonnie Steiger as Martha Whitmore
- Cameron Weston as Nigel Curwin

== Reception ==
HorrorNews.net gave the film a favorable review, writing "This is a nice representation of making what's due with what is on hand and not having to expense a lot of extra frills. The frills may have heightened the presentation but I think as an audience we get the gist of the direction enough to take in what is being served up. Hohl has created a decent supernatural thriller that holds up just fine in its low budget nature."

In contrast, Brutal as Hell heavily panned In Search of Lovecraft, as they felt that "If Howie were still alive, I think he’d sue the shit out of the filmmakers and possibly use the winnings to hire a hitman and have everyone involved in this travesty solidly whacked right the hell into the outer void of space and time. Word up, Hohl: try searching for Lovecraft a little harder, cuz you ain’t found him yet."

Bloody Good Horror gave the film a mixed review, contrasting the quality of the film, which they called "laughably acted and all around amateurish" against the effort put into its production, referring to it as "labors of love". The article finished by comparing the film to the then-upcoming film by Guillermo del Toro, which was also to be based on the Lovecraft mythos, "At the Mountains of Madness".
