= In the 1st Degree =

1995 video game

- Publisher: Broderbund
- Designers: Peter Adair; Haney Armstrong; Dexter Chow
- Platforms: Windows 3.x, Mac
- Release: EU: 1995; NA: August 31, 1995
- Genre: Adventure
- Mode: Single-player

In the 1st Degree is a legal drama adventure game released in 1995 by Broderbund. The player takes the role of a prosecutor attempting to convict an artist of grand theft and the first-degree murder of his business partner. This involves examining evidence, interviewing witnesses, and finally going to trial to secure a conviction. The program was developed by Peter Adair and Haney Armstrong of Adair and Armstrong.

The promotional tagline was "Someone's dead. Someone's lying. Can you prove Murder One?"

== Plot ==
James Tobin is a struggling artist in San Francisco who owns an art gallery with his business partner, Zachary Barnes. For some time, the gallery has been a lucrative business. However, after a new series of Tobin's paintings failed to sell, the gallery struggles financially. Tensions rise further when a burglary occurs at the gallery and Tobin's new series of paintings are stolen. During this time, unrelatedly, Barnes has a one-night stand with Tobin's girlfriend, Ruby Garcia. One morning a few weeks later, an incident occurs between Tobin and Barnes at the gallery and Tobin shoots Barnes dead.

Tobin claims that he killed Barnes in self-defense following an argument and a struggle. The police do not accept this claim and believe the killing to be an act of premeditation. They believe that the burglary several weeks before Barnes' death was carried out by Tobin himself, that he stole his own paintings to gain the insurance money to save the struggling gallery. Saying that Tobin killed Barnes not only to cover up his crime but also as an act of revenge for Barnes' affair with his girlfriend, the police arrest Tobin and charge him with grand theft and murder in the first degree.

Three months later, District Attorney Sterling Granger is summoned by Inspector Looper who provides him with substantial evidence with which he has to establish concrete proof that Tobin is guilty of the charges and present them in court, while trying to withstand doubts cast by Tobin's expert Defense Attorney Cynthia Charleston.

== Gameplay ==
The game is played through the eyes of San Francisco District Attorney Sterling Granger. The game begins with a video clip in which the homicide is announced on the news. After that, police detective Inspector Looper briefs the player on some of the facts of the case that have been discovered in her investigation. (Like all character interactions in this game, the briefing by Looper is full motion video, with the player having a first-person view.)

The player is then taken to Granger's office, where the player can choose to examine various evidence documents and photographs; view videos from Looper's interrogations of Tobin, Ruby, Barnes' wife Yvonne, or gallery employee Simon Lee; interview each of them (except Tobin) directly; or go to trial.

The main gameplay is the pre-trial interviewing and the direct or cross-examination of witnesses at trial. During interviews (and during the trial), the player is given a choice of questions to ask, each of which elicits a different response from the witness. Based on these questions and their responses, new questions become available. Only if the player asks the proper questions (and, sometimes, in the proper order) will the necessary information come out during the trial to secure a conviction against Tobin. (For example, if the player fails to make Ruby comfortable about discussing her affair with Barnes during the initial interview, she may deny ever having the affair when asked about it at trial.) In asking questions, the player also has to deal with the witnesses' different personality types and their relationships with Barnes, with Tobin, and with each other. (For example, Barnes' widow Yvonne, who works as the press secretary for San Francisco's mayor, speaks in a relatively calm and dignified manner, whereas Tobin's girlfriend Ruby is quick-tempered and can become very hostile.)

During the trial portion of the game, a video clip of a local newscast follows each witness' testimony. In those clips, reporters analyze the prosecutor's performance (and, thus, the player's performance) in the examination of that particular witness. The player's examination of a witness also can have an effect on the kinds of questions asked by Tobin's attorney and the witness' response to them.

Based on the player's overall performance, there are several possible outcomes to the game. The worst possible outcome is that the case is simply dismissed. The game may also end in Tobin's acquittal or with Tobin being convicted of lesser crimes (i.e. manslaughter or second-degree murder), with or without a grand theft conviction. The best possible outcome is a conviction for both grand theft and first-degree murder.

== Development ==
This game served as a departure from what Broderbund usually published, and was the first in their catalogue to tackle human drama and film-making in this way.

The San Francisco City Hall Courthouse was used for the courthouse setting, and the actors were filmed separately in front of a bluescreen. The shot was composited later using computer software.

San Francisco Assistant District AAl Giannini was a legal consultant during the script writing and filming.

== Reception ==
Reception

Review scores
Publication	Score
Computer Gaming World	4/5
GameSpot	7.6/10
PC Gamer (US)	82%
Macworld	4/5
NewMedia	"Awesome"
Computer Game Review	91/88/82
PC Games	B

Awards
Publication	Award
Codie award	Best Use of Live Actors in Multimedia 1996
ComputerLife Magazine	Best of Everything

GameSpot praised its " originality and accessibility". CD-Rom Today wrote "The interface is blessedly simple, the writing is snappy and realistic, and the acting is generally believable and only occasionally hammy. And the graphics are well-designed and rendered."

From Barbie to Mortal Kombat: Gender and Computer Games wrote that the game is less about solving the mystery about more about making a strong case. Often one may know the truth, but the witness hasn't yet been convinced to tell the truth on the stand. Therefore, the game is more about emotions and relationships, rather than facts.

In the 1st Degree was nominated for the Codie awards' 1996 "Best Adventure/Role Playing Software" prize, which ultimately went to Oregon Trail II. It was the second-place finalist for Computer Game Review's 1995 "Best FMV of the Year" award, which went to Phantasmagoria. The editors wrote, "In the 1st Degree was able to captivate the player with FMV sequences that looked as good as anything from a highly publicized murder trial of several months ago."

== Legacy ==
In 1995, In the 1st Degree was adapted into a novel of the same name by screenwriter Domenic Stansberry (under the pen name "Dominic Stone"), who had worked on the screenwriting for the game.
