= Lane Garrison =

American actor

- Occupation: Actor
- Years active: 1994-present
- Spouse: Mary Kaitlin Garrison (m. 2019)
- Children: 3

Lane Garrison is an American actor best known for the role of Tweener on the television series Prison Break. He appeared in the pilot episode of the El Rey network's series From Dusk till Dawn. He played Buck Barrow in the 2013 television miniseries Bonnie & Clyde. He starred opposite Kristen Stewart in the 2012 film Camp X-Ray.

== Early life ==
Garrison grew up in Richardson, Texas. Due to the troubled relationship with his mother, Garrison moved out at seventeen and turned to the family minister, Joe Simpson, who is also the manager and father of pop stars Jessica and Ashlee Simpson. Garrison lived with the Simpson family for a year. He graduated from J.J. Pearce High School in 1998, and at eighteen, he drove to Los Angeles with ambitions to become an actor. In 2005, he had a major break when he assumed the role of David "Tweener" Apolskis on the television series Prison Break.

== Legal history ==
In 2007, Garrison pleaded guilty to vehicular manslaughter, drunken driving and providing alcohol to a minor after a crash in December 2006 that killed 17-year-old Vahagn Setian, who had been a passenger in his car. Two 15-year-old girls, also passengers, were also injured in the crash. Then-26-year-old Garrison met Setian and the girls outside a liquor store then attended a high school party with them before jumping a curb and driving into a tree in Beverly Hills. He had cocaine in his system and his blood-alcohol level was more than twice the legal limit in California. He was sentenced to 40 months in jail on October 31, 2007. The actor was released from prison in April 2009, and served four years of parole. He was also ordered to pay $300,000 in restitution to the victims and their families.

In 2012, Garrison was accused of slapping his former girlfriend Ashley Mattingly at her apartment building in Los Angeles. Garrison pleaded no contest to the charge and in return avoided having to spend any more time behind bars. In 2013, he was sentenced to attend self-help classes, 52 Alcoholics Anonymous meetings and complete eight hours of community service.

== Personal life ==
On July 28, 2018, Garrison's daughter with fiancée Mary Kaitlin was born.

== Filmography ==
=== Film ===
| Year | Title | Role | Notes |
|---|---|---|---|
| 1999 | 4 Faces | | |
| 2004 | Quality Of Life | Heir | |
| 2007 | Shooter | Donnie Fenn | |
| 2007 | Crazy | Billy Garland | |
| 2008 | Graduation Day | Himself | Short film |
| 2009 | The Way We Weren't | | Short film |
| 2012 | Love Sex God | Himself | Documentary |
| 2013 | The Devil's In The Details | Trevor | |
| 2013 | Crime Share | Kyle | |
| 2014 | Camp X-Ray | Cpl. "Randy" Ransdell | |
| 2016 | Icebox | Officer Stephen | Short film |
| 2016 | 48 Hours to Live | Detective Childers | TV movie |
| 2017 | My Daddy's in Heaven | Adam Smith | TV movie |
| 2017 | Goldblooded | Lapis | Short film |
| 2018 | The Iron Orchard | Jim McNeely | |
| 2019 | The Divorce Party | Colin | |
| 2021 | 12 Mighty Orphans | Luther | Also writer |

=== Television ===
| Year | Title | Role | Notes |
|---|---|---|---|
| 1998 | The Dating Game | Himself | 1 episode |
| 2003 | Kingpin | Shanky Guy | 1 episode |
| 2005 | Night Stalker | Craig Boyler | 1 episode |
| 2005–2006 | Prison Break | David "Tweener" Apolskis | 14 episodes |
| 2011 | The Event | Sleeper #1 / Sleeper Guard | 3 episodes |
| 2013 | Bonnie and Clyde: Dead and Alive | Buck Barrow | Miniseries, 2 episodes |
| 2014 | From Dusk Till Dawn: The Series | Pete | 2 episodes |
| 2015 | Better Call Saul | Detective Hoffman | Episode: "Five-O" |
| 2015 | NCIS | Holt Perkins | 1 episode |
| 2015 | Messengers | Ronnie | Recurring, 4 episodes |
| 2015 | Major Crimes | Douglas Martin | 1 episode |
| 2016 | Roots | Frederick Murray | Miniseries, 1 episode |
| 2019 | Yellowstone | Ray | 3 episodes |
| 2023-present | Mayor of Kingstown | Carney | Recurring, 18 episodes |
