= Self/less =

2015 film by Tarsem

- Theatrical release poster
- Directed by: Tarsem Singh
- Written by: Alex Pastor; David Pastor
- Produced by: Ram Bergman; James D. Stern; Peter Schlessel
- Starring: Ryan Reynolds; Natalie Martinez; Matthew Goode; Victor Garber; Derek Luke; Ben Kingsley
- Cinematography: Brendan Galvin
- Edited by: Robert Duffy
- Music by: Antônio Pinto
- Production companies: Endgame Entertainment; FilmNation Entertainment; Ram Bergman Productions
- Distributed by: Focus Features (Note: Focus Features relaunched its Gramercy Pictures label for action, horror and science fiction movies. Self/less was to be released under the label, but the Gramercy branding was absent from the marketing materials despite the logo being credited in the film (both in the opening and closing). The revival of the Gramercy label would turn out to be short-lived.)
- Release date: July 10, 2015
- Running time: 117 minutes
- Country: United States
- Language: English
- Budget: $26 million
- Box office: $33.7 million

Self/less is a 2015 American science fiction action thriller film directed by Tarsem Singh, produced by Ram Bergman and James D. Stern and written by Alex and David Pastor. The film tells the story of a business tycoon and billionaire diagnosed with a terminal illness who manages to save his own life by transferring his consciousness into a new, younger body. The film stars Ryan Reynolds, Natalie Martinez, Matthew Goode, Victor Garber, Derek Luke, and Ben Kingsley. Many of the film's elements are similar to the 1966 film Seconds.

Self/less was originally set to release on September 26, 2014, but because of multiple setbacks and the absorption of its original distributor FilmDistrict, it was not released until July 10, 2015, by Focus Features. It was produced by Endgame Entertainment and was financed by FilmNation Entertainment. The film grossed $12 million in North America and a total of $33 million worldwide, against a $26 million production budget.

== Plot ==
Billionaire New Yorker Damian Hale is diagnosed with terminal cancer. He finds a business card directing him to Professor Albright, who informs him about a medical procedure called "shedding", in which one's consciousness is transferred into a new body. Damian agrees to the procedure and follows Albright's instructions to stage his own public death. Albright then transfers him into a new, younger body, and prescribes medication to alleviate the vivid hallucinations which he claims are side effects of the procedure.

Damian starts a new life in New Orleans under the incognito name of Edward Kidner and is quickly befriended by his neighbor Anton. He later forgets to take his medicine and has hallucinations of a woman and child. Damian (as Edward) questions Albright, who dismisses it, but accidentally mentions details of the hallucinations that Damian had not disclosed.

Albright then arranges for Damian to take a vacation in Hawaii, but Damian, convinced the hallucinations are a real memory, identifies a landmark he saw in his vision and heads to a farmhouse outside of St. Louis. There, he finds the woman, Madeline, who reacts to him as her apparently deceased husband Mark. Damian plays along as Mark, though he is shocked to learn that Mark may have sold himself to Albright, in order to pay for their daughter Anna's life-saving treatment. Damian and Madeline are suddenly attacked by Albright's men, including Anton. Damian fatally wounds Anton and kills his accomplices, then flees with Madeline to pick up Anna from school.

At a nearby motel, Damian then uses a laptop to research additional details regarding "shedding", and discovers that a man named Dr. Francis Jensen, now deceased, was the pioneer researcher in the field of transhumanism. In a video, Damian notices a tic Jensen shares with Albright, then sees Albright sitting next to Jensen, deducing that Jensen may have shed his consciousness into Albright's body.

Damian then finds Jensen's wife, Phyllis, in a nursing home, but she has Alzheimer's and remembers nothing. Damian lures Jensen (Albright) to the facility, where he reveals that the pills are meant to fully eliminate the original personalities of the bodies used in the shedding procedure, telling Damian that without the pills, Damian's consciousness will die, and Mark's will re-emerge.

Jensen later escapes when more killers arrive. Damian is almost overpowered, but Madeline wounds the attacker, who proves to be Anton in a new body. Anton reveals that he has shed multiple times. While Damian confiscates Anton's pills, Anton taunts Madeline to ask her "husband" why he cannot answer personal questions about their life.

Madeline then confronts "Mark" over his lack of knowledge of their personal details, causing Damian to reveal the entire story. He takes her and Anna to his old friend Martin O'Neill and convinces Martin to arrange for Madeline and Anna to flee to the Caribbean. When he and Madeline discover Anna playing with Martin's previously deceased child Tony, Martin admits that he allowed Tony to also use shedding and that Jensen's men are coming. Damian then reveals shedding's secret to Martin, who reacts in shock and disgust. Damian distracts Jensen's men while Martin helps the others to flee. Damian again fatally injures Anton, but the other thugs realize that Damian is alone and turn back, recapturing Madeline and Anna.

Damian then purposely stops taking his medicine to experience more of Mark's memories, which reveal that Jensen has a lab in an abandoned warehouse. Jensen captures him and starts to shed Anton into Mark's body. Damian, remembering that metal interferes with the process, hides a bullet casing in his mouth, causing the Shedding Machine to malfunction, preventing the transfer of Anton's consciousness. Masquerading as Anton, Damian then rescues the others. Although Jensen tries to claim that Damian needs him to survive, Martin was able to reverse-engineer the pills and give Damian the formula, allowing Damian to safely torch Jensen to death with a flamethrower. After killing Jensen, he has Martin complete Madeline and Anna's escape to the Caribbean.

Damian later visits his estranged daughter Claire but does not reveal his presence inside Mark, simply giving her a letter that reconciles Claire with her father. Damian then travels to the Caribbean and fully stops taking his medicine. The real Mark then slowly re-emerges and finds a video message from Damian thanking him for the time that he gave to him. The story concludes with Mark finally reuniting with his family.

== Cast ==
- Ryan Reynolds as Damian Hale/Mark Bitwell: Reynolds plays both Damian Hale (in Mark Bitwell's body) and Bitwell.
- Ben Kingsley as Damian Hale: A wealthy business man who has a terminal illness.
- Natalie Martinez as Madeline Bitwell: Wife of Mark Bitwell.
- Matthew Goode as Dr. Francis Jensen/Albright: The creator of the "shedding" process.
- Derek Luke as Anton, Damian's new friend.
- Victor Garber as Martin O'Neill, Damian's close friend
- Jaynee-Lynne Kinchen as Anna Bitwell, Mark's and Madeline's daughter
- Melora Hardin as Judy O'Neill, Martin's wife
- Michelle Dockery as Claire Hale, Damian's estranged daughter
- Sam Page as Carl
- Brendan McCarthy as Anton 2
- Thomas Francis Murphy as Dr. Jensen
- Sandra Ellis Lafferty as Phyllis Jensen
- Emily Tremaine as Mallory
- Teri Wyble as Andrea
- Mariana Vicente as Leah
- Dylan Lowe as Tony O'Neill

== Production ==
Endgame Entertainment and FilmDistrict financed the film, quickly putting it into development after the success of the two companies' science fiction movie Looper. FilmNation pre-sold the film at Cannes in 2013. It was the first film to completely sell out at the festival. The strong pre-sales limited the two financiers' exposure to the budget. FilmDistrict was set to distribute the film in the United States, but the company shut down and was absorbed into Universal's subsidiary Focus Features.

Principal photography began in October 2013 in New Orleans. Scenes were filmed at the Commander's Palace and the Howling Wolf. A sequence shortly after the film begins, depicting Hale in his elaborate Manhattan apartment, was shot in the three-story Trump Tower penthouse that served as Donald and Melania Trump's primary residence until 2017.

Antônio Pinto composed the film score. Dudu Aram was credited for additional music, as he had been on other scores by Pinto.

== Release ==
The film was originally set for release on September 26, 2014 by FilmDistrict but was later delayed to February 27, 2015, when Focus Features took over distribution to avoid competition with their own The Boxtrolls. On July 2, 2014, the feature's opening was rescheduled to April 17, 2015. On November 8, 2014, the studio once again postponed the release, to July 10, 2015. The first trailer was released on March 4, 2015.

== Reception ==
=== Box office ===
Self/less was released in North America, Sweden and Turkey on July 10, 2015. In North America, it opened in 2,353 theaters, earning $5.4 million in its opening weekend and ranking number eight at the domestic box office. In Turkey, the film opened in fifth place, making $135,191 from 208 screens, and stayed in the box office for six weeks, finishing with a total of $495,953. It opened in Italy on September 10, 2015, and finished in seventh place with a total of $353,291. Self/less would gross $12.3 million in North America and $21.4 million in other territories, for a total of $33.7 million against a production budget of $26 million.

=== Critical response ===
The review aggregator website Rotten Tomatoes reports a rating of 18% based on 142 reviews, and an average rating of 4.7/10. The site's consensus reads: "Self/less boasts a potential-packed premise, but does frustratingly little with it, settling for lackluster action at the expense of interesting ideas." On Metacritic, the film has a score of 34 out of 100, based on the reviews of 30 critics, indicating "generally unfavorable reviews". In CinemaScore polls, audiences gave Self/less an average grade of B+ on an A+ to F scale.

The IGN review by Josh Lasser awarded it a score of 5.0 out of 10, saying, "For someone with great visual command of the medium, Singh's latest is a disappointment."

== See also ==
- XChange
