= Cameron Johnson (actor) =

American actor (born 1999)

- Born: July 2, 1999 (age 26); Maurice, Louisiana, U.S.
- Occupation: Actor
- Years active: 2017–present

Cameron Johnson (born July 2, 1999) is an American actor. In 2020 he starred in the independent horror film Star Light. In 2020, he joined the cast of the NBC/Peacock soap opera, Days of Our Lives on a recurring basis as a recast of Theo Carver.

== Personal life ==
Johnson is the son of Eric Johnson and Phyllis Johnson (née Catalon). He has two brothers, Eric II and Myles. He grew up in Maurice, Louisiana but currently resides in Los Angeles, California. He attended North Vermilion High in his hometown and graduated in 2017.

== Career ==
Johnson made his television debut in an episode of the Fox sitcom The Mick in 2017 and also appeared in the television film The Wrong Crush. In 2018, he appeared in an episode of the Fox drama 9-1-1. In 2019, Johnson appeared in two episodes of the Hulu original series, Light as a Feather. In May 2020, Johnson starred opposite Scout Taylor-Compton in the independent horror film Star Light. On October 23, 2020, it was announced that Johnson had been cast in the role of Theo Carver on NBC's Days of Our Lives. Johnson made his debut on November 6, and departed on November 12. While he was only slated to appear in a handful of episodes, Johnson told Soap Opera Digest that he was definitely open to a return. In 2021, it was announced that Johnson was set to reprise the role in March 2021.

== Filmography ==
Year	Title	Role	Notes
2017	The Mick	Teenager #2	Episode: "The Mess" (2017)
2017	The Wrong Crus	Freddy	Television film
2018	9-1-1	Teenage Boy	Episode: "Hen Begins" (2018)
2019	Light as a Feather	Justin	2 Episodes Episode: "...Sick as a Dog (2019); Episode: "...Hungry Like a Wolf" (2019)
2020	Star Light	Dylan	Lead role
2020	Days of Our Lives	Theo Carver	Recurring role November 6 to November 12, 2020; March 10 to April 28, 2021; July 2 to August 19, 2021; October 28 to November 18, 2021; June 21 to July 1, 2022; June 19, 2023 to August 1, 2023
2021	Yes Day	Brad	Netflix original

== Awards and nominations ==
Year	Award	Category	Work	Result	Ref.
2020	National Black Film Festival	Best Actor	Star Light	Won	
