= April Fool's Day (2008 film) =

April Fools Day
- DVD cover
- Directed by: The Butcher Brothers
- Screenplay by: The Butcher Brothers; Mikey Wigart
- Story by: Danilo Bach
- Based on: April Fool's Day by Danilo Bach
- Produced by: Tara L. Craig; Frank Mancuso, Jr.
- Starring: Taylor Cole; Josh Henderson; Scout Taylor-Compton; Joe Egender; Jennifer Siebel
- Cinematography: Michael Maley
- Edited by: Raúl Dávalos
- Music by: James Stemple
- Production companies: Stage 6 Films; 360 Pictures
- Distributed by: Sony Pictures Home Entertainment
- Release date: March 25, 2008
- Running time: 91 minutes
- Country: United States
- Language: English

April Fool's Day is a 2008 American direct-to-video slasher film that is a remake of the 1986 film of the same name. It is directed by The Butcher Brothers, also known as Mitchell Altieri and Phil Flores. April Fool's Day is described by star Scout Taylor-Compton as "Mean Girls crossed with horror", and was released straight to DVD on March 25, 2008.

== Plot ==
On April 1, 2007, Desiree Cartier is hosting a party at her mansion for her actress friend Torrance Caldwell. Present for a pre-festivities toast are Blaine Cartier, Desiree's brother, who controls their joint inheritance (to Desiree's dislike), U.S. Senate candidate Peter Welling, Peter's "Miss Carolina" fiancée Barbie Reynolds, and the quintet's less wealthy videographer friend Ryan. With the party in full swing, Desiree's social nemesis and Ryan's not-so-secret crush Milan Hastings, arrives. Also present is chihuahua-toting society reporter Charles Lansford.

As another in her long string of April Fool's pranks, Desiree suggests Blaine get Milan tipsy on champagne and seduce her in his bedroom upstairs. Desiree and several of the others hover by the cracked-open bedroom door, prepared to videotape the affair with the camera Desiree lifted from Ryan. However, Milan has a seizure and falls off the balcony to her death. The group goes to court, and Blaine loses control of the family's fortune, which shifts to Desiree, but they are found innocent and Milan's death is considered a fatal prank.

One year later, Desiree, Blaine, Peter, Barbie, Torrance, and Ryan receive anonymous invitations to meet on Milan's grave at noon, April 1, 2008, with the cryptic P.S. "I have proof." Just after the entire sextet is back together, a messenger comes to the grave with a box containing a letter and a laptop computer. The letter says one of the six murdered Milan, and if that person does not confess, all of them will be dead by midnight. As a show of intent, the computer has footage of Charles drowning in his pool.

Everyone goes from the cemetery to the pool to confirm this mishap. Subsequently, an increasingly frantic Desiree sees one "suspect" after another "murdered" before her eyes (though the bodies keep disappearing). Barbie is electrocuted in a beauty pageant dressing room, Peter's campaign truck runs him down in a parking garage, Ryan's throat is slit in his apartment, and returning home, Desiree and Blaine discover even their long-time butler Wilford has been butchered in the kitchen.

After a brief separation from her brother, Desiree finds him tied to a chair. Worse yet, gun-wielding Torrance soon has Desiree tied inches away in another chair. After some back and forth, and Torrance fatally shooting Blaine in the chest, a chagrined Desiree finally admits it was she who spiked Milan's fatal drink, while allowing brother Blaine to become the "fall guy." At this point Blaine cannot contain a chuckle, and soon the whole crew of 2008 "victims" are surrounding a still-tied Desiree, telling her what a bitch she is, and how they have conspired to prove it to her. Special effects people from Torrance's Boogie Nights 2 set have equipped Blaine and the others with "squibs," and other cast members faked Desiree out by dressing as cops and "confirming" Ryan's murder as she and her brother were fleeing the scene.

To illustrate her end of the charade involving a revolver shooting blanks, Torrance pulls the trigger once more. Unfortunately for Desiree, this time the cartridge in the chamber is real, and the bullet blows off the top of her head. The next scene involves the same inquest-probate judge from a year earlier absolving Torrance of any guilt for Desiree's death, and confirming Blaine as sole heir of the family estate. The final scene shows Blaine driving off in what was Desiree's red Mercedes, a slowly building smirk on his face.

== Cast ==
- Taylor Cole as Desiree Cartier
- Josh Henderson as Blaine Cartier
- Scout Taylor-Compton as Torrance Caldwell
- Joe Egender as Ryan
- Jennifer Siebel as Barbie Reynolds
- Samuel Child as Peter Welling
- Joseph McKelheer as Charles Lansford
- Frank Aard as Wilford
- Sabrina Ann Aldridge as Milan Hastings
- Charles Black as Judge

== Production ==
April Fool's Day was directed by The Butcher Brothers, and the two also re-wrote the script for the remake of the 1986 film of the same name with Mikey Wigart. Picked up by Stage 6 Films for distribution, it was filmed in North Carolina under producers Tara L. Craig and Frank Mancuso Jr. Mancuso had also produced the original. Scout Taylor-Compton noted that the filmmakers planned to make April Fool's Day an R-rated film.

The film would retain most of the original's humor; however, Phil Flores said it is "pretty much contemporized, with off-beat humor, different settings -- something that would gel with today's audience". Mitchell Altieri noted that "it's kind of more a twisting and turning story" with "some really good scares".
