= Boshra Dastournezhad =

Iranian actress and model

- بشرا دستورنژاد
- Born: Boshra Dastournezhad Haghighi; April 7, 1985 (age 41); Shiraz, Iran
- Other name: Boshra
- Education: Baháʼí Institute for Higher Education
- Occupations: Actress, model
- Years active: 2009–present

Boshra Dastournezhad (née Boshra Dastournezhad Haghighi; born 1985) is an Iranian model and actress. She appeared in the 2006 film Radio Dreams.

== Early life ==
Boshra Dastournezhad Haghighi was born in 1985 in Shiraz into a family of Baháʼí faith, as the daughter of Mehran Dastournezhad Haghighi and Fariba Vesali. She is the granddaughter of Abdosamad Dastournezhad Haghighi and Parvin Samandari (Agah). At age 12, Dastournezhad started modeling for her aunt, Shabnam Dastournezhad Haghighi, a professional painter in Ottawa, which led her towards a career in modeling.

She studied children's literature and theatre at Baháʼí Institute for Higher Education (also known as BIHE University).

== Career ==
Dastournezhad started modeling professionally in Turkey in 2009. Since she has modeled for several local and national campaigns. In 2012, her modeling endeavors took her to the United States. While in the United States, she had several jobs that helped to propel her career.

In 2014, during a trip to Seattle, she was recorded reciting an original poem, "Oral B" in her native language of Persian. It was posted to Facebook and received over 16,000 shares, catching the attention of Marjaneh Moghimi, a prominent Iranian-American film producer. After a brief conversation, Dastournezhad was cast as "Maral" in the film Radio Dreams (2016), by film director Babak Jalali.

For her stage debut, she played the male character "Prince Manouchehr" in the play Zohreh and Manouchehr in Santa Monica, working alongside Shahrokh Moshkin Ghalam. Dastournezhad was a leading member in the play Khale Sooske (English: Auntie Cockroach), which travelled to Los Angeles and San Francisco.

== Reception ==
Writing in Variety, critic Catherine Bray called her performance "a standout among the supporting players, sketching the financially astute daughter of the station owner with Aubrey Plaza levels of deadpan misanthropy."

Neil Young of The Hollywood Reporter described the film as "Presenting a nuanced, intelligent and consistently droll take on hot-button subjects of immigration, identity and cultural assimilation..." and that it "stand[s] comparison with the finest radio-themed enterprises of the current century..."

Writing in Variety, critic Catherine Bray called the film a "quietly satisfying gem..." and a "deserving Tiger competition winner at Rotterdam...".

== Awards and nominations ==
Year	Award	Festival	Recipient	Result
2016	Tiger Award: Best Picture	45th International Film Festival Rotterdam (Netherlands)	Radio Dreams	Won
2016	Special Jury Mention	Seattle International Film Festival	Radio Dreams	Won
