= Larry Laverty =

American actor and photographer

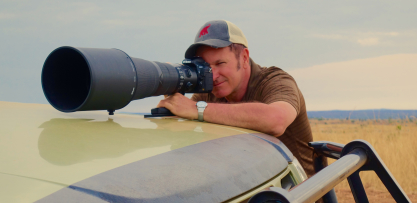
- Born: 1959 (age 66–67); Berkeley, California, U.S.
- Education: Boise State University; American Conservatory Theater
- Occupations: Actor; photographer
- Years active: 1986–present

Laurence Laverty (born 1959) is an American character actor. His film roles include playing Larry Davies in The Hamiltons (2006), as well as appearances in Dead Tone (2007) and in Gus Van Sant's Elephant (2003). Laverty made television guest appearances in Judging Amy, The Practice, Breaking Vegas, Nash Bridges, and MADtv. His performance on The Tonight Show led to a number of appearances on daytime soap operas including Days of Our Lives, Passions, Port Charles, and All My Children.

He is also a writer and photographer and, in 2019, published a book of photography entitled Power and Majesty: The Plight and Preservation of the African Elephant, which contains Larry's photographs from his observations of the elephants in Africa. The aim of the book is to raise awareness about and support wildlife conservation and animal welfare. In 2025, he followed up with his second book, this one observing the elephants in Asia, Magnetic: Humanity and the Asian Elephant.

== Early life ==
Laverty was born in 1959 in Berkeley, California, and grew up in nearby Oakland. His father was an engineer and a veteran of World War II, and his mother was a bookkeeper and historian. Laverty was an Eagle Scout, as well as a member of the Sierra Club and the Audubon Society. He graduated from Skyline High School in Oakland and then moved to Kuna, Idaho, to live on the family farm while he worked a variety of jobs. He earned two college degrees, in business administration and political science, from Boise State University, which included attending an acting class during his last year before graduating in 1985. He also undertook graduate studies at Johns Hopkins University.

== Career ==
Laverty performed on stage in a number of plays and musicals while studying acting with the American Conservatory Theater, The Groundlings, and The Second City. He spent 11 years living in Milwaukee, Wisconsin, in Calgary, Alberta, and in Butte, Montana, while he trained in the hopes of joining the U.S. Olympics team as a speedskater. In 1990, his second film appearance was in a minor role as a soldier in John Frankenheimer's The Fourth War.

Some of Laverty's earliest appearances in a lead role were in two early short films by Irish filmmaker Dermot Tynan, A Talk in the Dark and The Biscuit Eaters. Within the same year, he acted in a Canadian movie production, Icetime, with Canadian actor Jackson Davies.

Laverty has appeared in more than 100 films, including Gus Van Sant's Elephant (2003), What's Bugging Seth? (2005), Further North (2008), The Wylds (2010), Cut (2011), American Disciples (2011), Radio Dreams (2016), and The Control Group (2014). He was also a producer of several films including Kid (1993), which premiered at the Sundance Film Festival, Most of the Time (2016), and Gods In Shackles (2016).

Laverty has appeared in a number of horror films. He appeared in the 2007 film Dead Tone in a supporting role. The next year, he appeared in the Antony De Gennaro film Son of Terror and the Phillip Grasso film ChainSmoke. He has also appeared in a number of television roles including Days of Our Lives, Judging Amy, The Practice, and All My Children. In 2016, Laverty traveled to Ireland to work once again with Tynan in Most of the Time (2016). He starred in a lead role and was also co-producer of the short film.

== Photography and conservation ==
Laverty began photography at the age of 5. From 2010 to 2015, Laverty images were published in the MacArthur Metro, a newspaper serving Oakland, California, for which he also was a columnist. Beginning in 2015 onward, his images of wildlife in Africa were published by numerous international wildlife conservation organizations.

In 2017, he began taking part in speaking engagements that focused on the plight of the African elephant, engagements that revolved around the presentation of his images taken while spending six months in Africa. In 2019, he released a table-top book of images and observations on African elephants entitled Power and Majesty: The Plight and Preservation of the African Elephant. Larry followed that up with publication of a similar book on Asia's elephants Magnetic: Humanity and the Asian Elephant, published in 2025.

== Filmography ==
Laverty has appeared in more than 100 films and televisions series, including:

Film
| Year | Title | Role | Notes |
|---|---|---|---|
| 1990 | The Fourth War | Aide to Hackworth | Uncredited |
| 1991 | Icetime | Fred | Short film |
| 1992 | A Talk In The Dark | The Man | |
| 1993 | Made in America | Mechanic | Uncredited |
| 1998 | Mafia! | Dealer | Uncredited |
| 2002 | High Crimes | FBI SWAT Team Member | Uncredited |
| 2003 | Love Comes Softly | Funeral Man | Uncredited |
| 2003 | Elephant | Teacher #3 | |
| 2005 | What's Bugging Seth | Fred | |
| 2006 | The Hamiltons | Larry Davies | |
| 2007 | Dead Tone | Police officer | |
| 2008 | In Search of Lovecraft | Professor Sutton | |
| 2008 | The Sanguinarian | Ammiel | |
| 2008 | Natural Possession | Detective Al Cooper | |
| 2009 | Dog | Detective Robert Burns | |
| 2010 | The Adventures of Chris Fable | Iggy | |
| 2011 | The Family | Deputy Bobby Peterson | |
| 2012 | The Locals | Abel | |
| 2013 | Post Mortem, America 2021 | Ray | |
| 2014 | Man from Reno | Hotel Manager | Uncredited |
| 2014 | The Control Room | Agent Trapper | |
| 2016 | Most of the Time | Frank | Short film |
| 2017 | Branded | Salty | |
| 2017 | Radio Dreams | TV reporter | |
| 2024 | The family business | Deputy Bobby Peterson | |

Television
| Year | Title | Role | Notes |
|---|---|---|---|
| 1998 | Days of Our Lives | FBI Agent #2 | 1 episode |
| 1999 | Nash Bridges | Bystander #1 | 1 episode (uncredited) |
| 1997–1999 | Port Charles | Officer Howell / Waiter | 2 episodes |
| 2000 | MADtv | Co-pilot | 1 episode (season 5) |
| 2000 | Judging Amy | Mr. O'Neil | 1 episode |
| 2001 | Passions | Fisherman | 1 episode |
| 2002 | The Practice | Jury Foreman | 1 episode |
| 2003 | All My Children | BJ's Manager | 1 episode |
| 2003–2004 | The New Detectives | Family Member / Robert Brown | 2 episodes |
| 2005 | Breaking Vegas | Al Francesco | 1 episode |
