= Kabul Dreams =

Rock band from Afghanistan

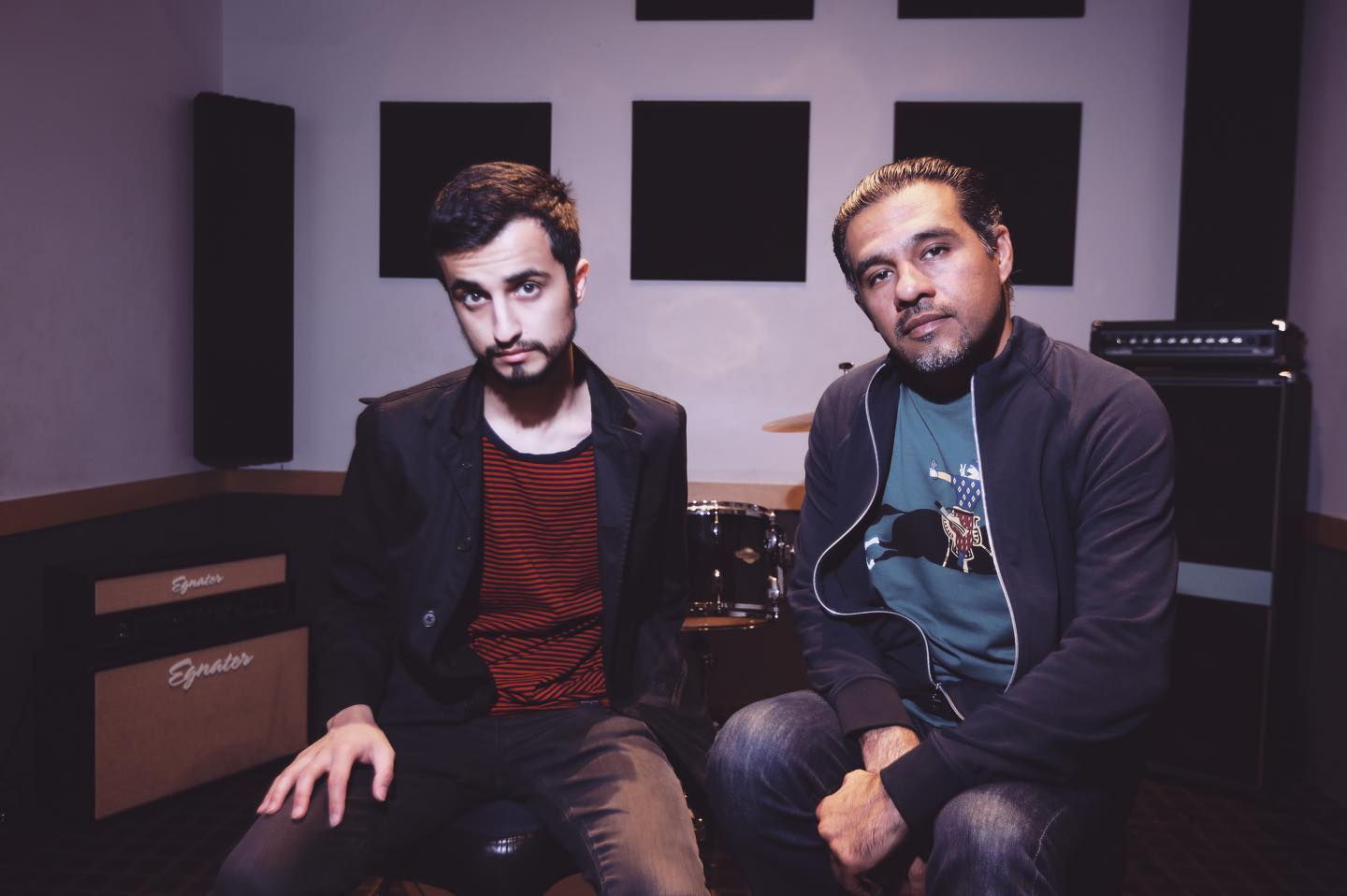
- Kabul Dreams band members Sulyman Qardash and Siddique Ahmed

Background information
- Origin: Kabul, Afghanistan
- Genres: Indie rock, rock and roll
- Years active: 2008–present
- Members: Sulyman Qardash; Siddique Ahmed
- Past members: Mojtaba Habibi Shandiz; Raby Adib; Jai Dhar
- Website: http://kabuldreams.com/

Kabul Dreams is a rock band from Afghanistan, established in 2008 in Kabul. The band consists of Sulyman Qardash (lead singer and guitarist) and Siddique Ahmed (bassist). The band is managed by Alykhan Kaba. Kabul Dreams has paved the way for a modest but growing rock scene in Afghanistan, rebuilding itself after decades of war. The band's motivation to perform came from their own love for music, but also from a public hunger for a new life after war – a life that included new music and art.

== History ==
All of the band members were born in Afghanistan, but they were displaced to neighboring countries as refugees during the Taliban reign – Sulyman Qardash in Uzbekistan, Siddique Ahmed in Pakistan, and Mojtaba Habibi Shandiz in Iran. After the fall of the Taliban regime, the band members returned to Afghanistan and met each other in Kabul. Since the bandmates originate from different regions, they do not share a common first language, and perform in English. Their musical influences include Sex Pistols, Metallica, Nirvana and Oasis.

In April 2013, Kabul Dreams released their first album, Plastic Words. The album was mixed by Grammy winner Alan Sanderson, who has previously worked with artists including Michael Jackson and The Rolling Stones.

In 2014, the band relocated to Oakland, California to grow their presence in the American music scene. While the band had experience performing in Europe and Asia, they made their North American debut that year at the high-profile arts festival, South by Southwest. They have played several more shows since then, located primarily in the Bay Area. In 2016, they partnered again with Alan Sanderson to release their second album, Megalomaniacs.

== Band members ==
Current members

- Sulyman Qardash - lead vocals, guitar (2008–present)
- Siddique Ahmed - bass (2008–present)

Former members

- Mojtaba Habibi Shandiz - drums (2008-2013)
- Raby Adib - drums (2013-2018)
- Jai Dhar - drums (2019-2022)

Timeline

== Discography ==
Plastic Words (2013)

Track Listing
No.	Title	Length
1	Crack in the Radio	1:53
2	Plastic Words	4:28
3	Can You Imagine	3:38
4	A Flower After Storm	2:59
5	Life is Rubbish Without You	3:10
6	Grip it	3:38
7	Air	2:49
8	I Wanna Runaway	2:11
9	Good Morning Freedom	3:15
10	Mirror	3:41
11	Speed of Love	3:15

Megalomaniacs (2017)

Track Listing
No.	Title	Length
1	Rush	1:53
2	Thousand Pieces	3:00
3	Brain Drain	3:28
4	Torn Apart	2:49
5	Ghost	3:23
6	Saturated Hope	2:51
7	Out of My Mind	3:44
8	Head Hurts	2:58
9	We Are Who We Are Not	2:54
10	Hyper Colors	2:53

With Love from Kabul Dreams (2019)

Track Listing
No.	Title	Length
1	Fasl	3:03
2	Parwaz Kon	3:16
3	Sarab	4:27

== Filmography ==
Radio Dreams (2016) – as themselves

Radio Dreams is a film about a Persian language radio station located in the Bay Area that tries to arrange a jam session between the Afghan rock band Kabul Dreams and the metal legends Metallica. The film is a fictional story, and features Metallica drummer Lars Ulrich.

In 2016, Radio Dreams won the Hivos Tiger Award at the International Film Festival Rotterdam. In 2017, the North American rights to the film were acquired by Matson Films in Los Angeles. It was slated for theatrical release in late April and May 2017.
