= Silver City (2004 film) =

- Theatrical release poster
- Directed by: John Sayles
- Screenplay by: John Sayles
- Produced by: Maggie Renzi
- Starring: Maria Bello; Thora Birch; David Clennon; Chris Cooper; Alma Delfina; Richard Dreyfuss; Miguel Ferrer; James Gammon; Daryl Hannah; Danny Huston; Kris Kristofferson; Sal Lopez; Michael Murphy; Mary Kay Place; Luis Saguar; Tim Roth; Ralph Waite; Billy Zane
- Cinematography: Haskell Wexler
- Edited by: John Sayles
- Music by: Mason Daring
- Production company: Anarchist's Convention Films
- Distributed by: Newmarket Films
- Release dates: May 13, 2004 (Cannes Film Market); September 17, 2004 (United States)
- Running time: 128 minutes
- Country: United States
- Language: English
- Box office: $1.3 million

Silver City is a 2004 American political satire comedy-drama film written and directed by John Sayles. Chris Cooper portrays an inept Republican gubernatorial candidate, a character that was noted for similarities to U.S. President George W. Bush. The film's large ensemble cast includes, among others, Richard Dreyfuss, Danny Huston, Michael Murphy, Maria Bello, Kris Kristofferson, Mary Kay Place, Thora Birch, Tim Roth, Billy Zane and Daryl Hannah.

The film is a "murder mystery [linked] to a political satire"; according to Sayles; it is "about electoral politics, but also about the press."

== Plot ==
Richard "Dicky" Pilager, the dim-witted scion of a powerful political dynasty, is running for Governor of Colorado. One day, while filming a campaign ad that shows him fishing at Arapahoe Lake, Pilager hooks a corpse on location. Chuck Raven, Pilager's campaign manager, hires Danny O'Brien, a former journalist who works as a private investigator, to examine the case. Raven urges O'Brien to find potential links between the body and Pilager's political enemies.

O'Brien's job is essentially to intimidate Pilager's opponents, and he has numerous revealing conversations with various people. He learns that business mogul Wes Benteen is using Pilager to promote his own agenda. The interviews also reveal further corruption: politicians, land developers, and mining companies are conspiring to ignore certain environmental issues. O'Brien also learns about illegal migrant workers, as well as a potentially damaging love affair.

== Cast ==
- Chris Cooper as Richard "Dicky" Pilager. Dicky Pilager is the son of an influential Colorado Senator. He was not successful in a mining enterprise, so he has decided to run for Governor of Colorado. His campaign is largely funded by family friend Wes Benteen.
- Danny Huston as Danny O'Brien. A private investigator, Danny was a reporter for the Mountain Monitor newspaper before getting fired for reporting a false story. Now working for Chuck Raven, he is to intimidate anyone who might be trying to sabotage the Pilager campaign.
- Richard Dreyfuss as Chuck Raven, a campaign manager for Pilager. A lifelong family friend, he is in charge of protecting the family name. He hires Danny O'Brien in a stratagem to ensure the campaign won't be tainted by political scandal.
- Kris Kristofferson as Wes Benteen. Benteen is the billionaire mogul who is funding the campaign. His businesses benefit the Pilager family in return for political favors. His companies produce meat and agricultural products and provide medical services. He also owns a major football team, the Prospectors. He finances half the campaign in order to secure land development rights.
- Maria Bello as Nora Allardyce, a reporter at the Mountain Monitor and Danny O'Brien's ex-wife.
- Mary Kay Place as Grace Seymour. Seymour runs a private investigation firm and is Danny O'Brien's boss. She is a longtime associate of Chuck Raven.
- David Clennon as Morton "Mort" Seymour, Grace's husband and a real estate developer. He is trying to gain influence with the Pilagers thru Chandler Tyson, in order to obtain approval of his Silver City project.
- Tim Roth as Mitch Paine. Paine is Danny O'Brien's friend, and a former reporter at the Mountain Monitor who was fired for the same reason as O'Brien. He runs an underground news website and is a source of information.
- Michael Murphy as Senator Judson Pilager, a powerful U.S. senator from Colorado and Dicky Pilager's father. He constantly bemoans his son's ineptness.
- Daryl Hannah as Madeline "Maddy" Pilager. Maddy is a free-spirited, black sheep daughter of the Pilager family. She is one of the people whom Danny must keep out of the public eye.
- Sal Lopez as Tony Guerra, a Mexican-American chef whom Danny enlists in an effort to learn about the dead man.
- Luis Saguar as Vince Esparza. Vince imports undocumented Mexicans for various, cheap labor tasks. He worked for Wes Benteen at one time.
- Miguel Ferrer as Cliff Castleton, an ultra right-wing radio commentator who has been at odds with Chuck Raven and the Pilagers for thirty years. He is also one of the people whom Danny is tasked to keep under control.
- Ralph Waite as Casey Lyle, a former mining safety inspector who was falsely caught up in a mining accident scandal. He is also "warned" by Danny.
- James Gammon as Sheriff Joe Skaggs, who Investigates the dead body found in the lake. His brother was being investigated by Danny in the story that got Danny fired.
- Billy Zane as Chandler Tyson, a land developer and lobbyist in Wes Benteen's and the Pilagers' pocket. Tyson is dating Nora Allardyce.
- Thora Birch as Karen Cross, Mitch's assistant at the website. Cross provides Danny with information.
- Maggie Roswell as Ellie Hastings, a member of the City Council.

== Reception ==
=== Box office and distribution ===
Silver City had a limited release in the United States, where it was marketed as a comedy about an "intellectually challenged, poorly spoken politician." Sayles commented on that marketing approach in an entertainment interview for CNN:

You basically give it to the company, and they advertise it the way that gets the most people in the theater. [When it plays in] other countries, [they] may emphasize the Chinatown aspects. The problem with all my movies, because they're complicated, is they don't boil down to two sentences, so you emphasize this part or that part of it.

The film played in 162 theaters at its widest and earned US$1.4 million at the box office in Canada and the United States. It also earned around $300,000 from both Ireland and the United Kingdom.

=== Critical response ===
Silver City had its world premiere at the Cannes Film Market during the Cannes Film Festival. Critics noted the similarities between the fictitious Dicky Pilager and the real George W. Bush, with some also seeing parallels between the fictitious campaign manager and the real Karl Rove.

Roger Ebert praised the film, but said it likely wouldn't change any votes in the 2004 election: "America is familiar with the way [George W. Bush] talks, and about half of us are comfortable with it. That's why Silver City may not change any votes. There is nothing in the movie's portrait of Pilager/Bush that has not already been absorbed and discounted by the electorate."

Ruthe Stein called the film "wildly uneven" with "dull" stretches: " . . but the movie comes alive when Cooper is in it, especially his scenes with Richard Dreyfuss as Dickie's savvy campaign manager."

Caryn James called the film's script and direction "exhilarating", characterizing the film as "a Bush-bashing work that is more than Bush-bashing" which "goes beyond election-year satire to reach broader themes of corporate power, campaign double talk and journalistic responsibility." She also called the film a "detective story with a half-dozen major characters and a twisty Chinatown plot that begins when the environmentally hostile Dickie is filming an environmentally friendly campaign ad and fishes a corpse out of a river."

The review aggregator website Rotten Tomatoes reported that 48% of critics gave the film a positive review, based on 128 reviews. The website's consensus reads, "Heavy-handed and often dull."
