= Radio Dreams =

- Radio Dreams promotional poster
- رویاهای رادیویی
- Directed by: Babak Jalali
- Written by: Babak Jalali, Aida Ahadiany
- Produced by: Marjaneh Moghimi
- Cinematography: Noaz Deshe
- Production company: Butimar
- Distributed by: Reel Suspects
- Release date: February 1, 2016 (Rotterdam)
- Running time: 91 minutes
- Countries: United States; Iran
- Languages: English, Persian
- Budget: US$ 300,000

Radio Dreams is a 2016 American film by Iranian-born film director Babak Jalali. Inspired by a group of real life Iranian Metallica fans, calling themselves the Persian Magnetic, and the realities of expatriate life of the Iranian diaspora in the United States.

The film Radio Dreams won the 2016 Tiger Award at the International Film Festival Rotterdam, and Jalali won the Best Director Award at Andrey Tarkovsky Film Festival in Russia. In 2016 the film was shown at the 32nd Warsaw Film Festival in the "Discoveries" section.

== Plot ==
Hamid Royani is the station manager at Pars-FM Radio, the Bay Area's premiere Persian language radio station. As everyone at Pars-FM looks forward to a continuously delayed jam session by Afghan rock band Kabul Dreams with metal legends Metallica, Royani despairs. As a respected man of the arts in his homeland, he must struggle against the commercial demands of the station's owners; erudite and eloquent in his own tongue, he must face the ups and downs of everyday life in a land where he can hardly speak the language.

== Cast ==
- Mohsen Namjoo as Hamid Royani
- Lars Ulrich as himself
- Boshra Dastournezhad as Maral Afshar
- Kabul Dreams (Sulyman Qardash, Siddique Ahmed, Raby Adib) as themselves
- Bella Warda as Sherbet
- Mohammad Talani as Reza Gerami
- Babak Mortazavi as Jamshid
- Mahmood Schricker as Morad
- Keyumars Hakim as Sohrab Afshar
- Leila Shahrestani as Leila Shahrestani
- Ali Tahbaz as Yashar
- Mansur Taeed as Dr. Jim Rakhshandeh
- Larry Laverty as TV reporter
- Kyle Kernan as wrestling coach
- Casimir Carothers as little drumming boy
- Fat Dog as guitar salesman
- Litz Plummer as opera singer

== Production ==
Marjaneh Moghimi, a producer of community documentaries, was looking to produce her first fictional feature and approached Babak Jalali to helm it. A personal friend of Mohsen Namjoo, Moghimi introduced him to Jalali; at the same time Kabul Dreams had just decided to relocate to the United States, and around these cast members the story was written. With a minimal budget of US$300,000, a virtue was made of necessity and the story that developed staged the action within the span of a day within the confines of a radio station. This setting in turn was to play a part in the lighting and camera setups used by cinematographer Noaz Deshe. The design of the film poster was made by design agency, Ceft and Company New York.

== Reception ==
Neil Young of The Hollywood Reporter described the film as, "presenting a nuanced, intelligent and consistently droll take on hot-button subjects of immigration, identity and cultural assimilation..." and that it "stand[s] comparison with the finest radio-themed enterprises of the current century..."

Writing in Variety, critic Catherine Bray called the film a "quietly satisfying gem..." and a "deserving Tiger competition winner at Rotterdam..."

== Awards and nominations ==
Year	Award	Category	Result	Recipient	Notes
2016	International Film Festival Rotterdam	Tiger Award	Won	Radio Dreams	
2016	Seattle International Film Festival	Special Jury Mention	Won	Radio Dreams	
2016	Durban International Film Festival	Best Actor: Mohsen Namjoo	Won	Radio Dreams	
2016	Andrey Tarkovsky International Film Festival	Best Director	Won	Radio Dreams	
2016	International Film Festival Rotterdam	Best Film	Won	Radio Dreams	

== See also ==
- White Shadow (film)
