= The Control Group (film) =

- Directed by: Peter Hurd
- Written by: Peter Hurd; Logan Gion
- Produced by: Peter Hurd; William J. Cox; Jon Leif Julsrud
- Starring: Brad Dourif; Ross Destiche; Jenna Enemy
- Cinematography: Jessica Gallant
- Music by: Anthony Bannach; Steve Yeaman
- Production companies: Point and Shoot Productions; Scatena & Rosner Films
- Distributed by: Wild Eye Releasing; Io Pictures Corporation
- Release dates: October 22, 2014 (Twin Cities Film Festival); February 21, 2017 (DVD)
- Running time: 81 minutes
- Country: United States
- Language: English

The Control Group is a 2014 American horror mystery film that first premiered at the Twin Cities Film Fest. The film is directed by Peter Hurd and showcases an ensemble cast led by Brad Dourif. The cast includes Ross Destiche, Jenna Enemy, Justen Jones, Emily Soto, Shane Phillip, Monique Candelaria, and Jerry G. Angelo. Filmed on location at the Fergus Falls State Hospital.

== Plot ==
Jack (Ross Destiche) wakes up in an old, abandoned mental institution. He is not alone; four other college students are in the same predicament. They soon realize they are part of a secret experiment conducted by the mysterious Dr. Broward (Brad Dourif).

As the group explores the institution, they encounter hallucinations and other side effects of a drug they've been unknowingly given. They split up, searching the large space for the "Blank Slate" files, which they believe hold the key to their predicament. Jack, with the help of the ghostly Anne, finds the files in a cabinet. The files reveal patient records, marked with the word "Wiped."

Meanwhile, Grant is captured by a group of plague doctor-like figures. He is subjected to a procedure that turns him into a zombie-like creature. He later reemerges, showing signs of both his former self and the creature he has become. The group learns from the files that the experiment they are part of is designed to store consciousness instead of wiping it. The last consciousness stored belongs to a dangerous patient known for horrific crimes. They realize that this consciousness is now in the machine they are connected to.

As they face the relentless threats of zombie-like creatures, the hospital's staff, and their own deteriorating sanity, several group members, including Vanessa and Corey, fall victim to the looming dangers. Heather (Monique Candelaria), another group member, is also killed in a gruesome encounter.

In the climax of the film, Jack and Dr. Broward confront each other in the depths of the asylum, housing a large faded vault. Inside lies a mottled skeleton, the remnants of the last patient subjected to the consciousness-storing procedure. They remove the wires from the skeleton, preparing to use the machine. Meanwhile, other survivors fight off agents working for Dr. Broward, sparking rebellion within the institution.

In a shocking turn, Grant, although subjected to the experiment, resists and retaliates against Dr. Broward, further adding to the chaos. The survivors finally manage to escape the hospital, leaving the unconscious Dr. Broward behind.

The fate of Grant, the last seen undergoing the same procedure as Dr. Broward, remains uncertain.

== Cast ==
- Brad Dourif as Dr. Broward
- Ross Destiche as Jack
- Jenna Enemy as Vanessa
- Justen Jones as Grant
- Emily Soto as Anne
- Shane Phillip as Corey
- Monique Candelaria as Heather
- Jerry G. Angelo as Hanson
- Kodi Lane as Jaime
- Larry Laverty as Agent Trapper
- Meisha Johnson as Nurse Lee
- Taso N. Stavrakis as Agent Torrez
- Luce Rains as The Patient
- Ian Pickett as Ian
- Denise Mauer as Mrs. Ramsay
- Dustin Severson as self
- Jamie Cooper as Crow

== Release ==
The film premiered at the Twin Cities Film Fest on October 22, 2014.

== Reception ==
John Townsend of Starburst rated the film 4 stars out of 10, calling it "What could have been an enjoyable, if largely formulaic genre film becomes an increasingly frustrating and tiresome experience as it progresses." Matt Boiselle of Dread Central rated the film 1.5 stars out of 5, writing that "Hurd sets up a nice premise, decent locale, and interesting government cover-up backstory, but it's ultimately dragged to its demise by a collection of bad acting stances." Mark L. Miller of Ain't It Cool News called it "an ambitious and well intentioned experiment that just isn't so successful at mixing subgenres and telling an engaging tale."
