= Everything Strange and New =

- Theatrical release poster
- Directed by: Frazer Bradshaw
- Written by: Frazer Bradshaw
- Produced by: A.D. Liano; Laura Techera Francia
- Starring: Jerry McDaniel; Beth Lisick; Luis Saguar; Rigo Chacon Jr.
- Cinematography: Frazer Bradshaw
- Edited by: Frazer Bradshaw; Jesse Spencer
- Music by: Dan Plonsey; Kent Sparling
- Production company: Lucky Hat Entertainment
- Distributed by: IndiePix Films
- Release date: February 25, 2011
- Running time: 84 minutes
- Country: United States
- Language: English

Everything Strange and New is a 2011 American independent film directed by San Francisco-based cinematographer Frazer Bradshaw and produced by A.D. Liano and Laura Techera Francia. It premiered at the 2009 Sundance Film Festival and was commercially released by IndiePix Films in 2011.

The Film won the FIPRESCI award presented by the International Federation of Film Critics and was nominated for both a Gotham Award and an Independent Spirit Award in 2011.

== Plot ==
Wayne is a carpenter and father stuck in an uninspiring marriage with a home mortgage that is underwater. In the wake of existential questions that propel Wayne in to deep thought, his divorced friend Leo offers no answers, but instead raises a complex emotional question of adulthood.

== Cast ==
- Jerry McDaniel as Wayne
- Beth Lisick as Renee
- Luis Saguar as Manny
- Rigo Chacon Jr. as Leo
- Diana Tenes as Manny's Wife
- Susie Wise as Sara

== Production ==
The cinematographer was San Francisco-based Frazer Bradshaw; it was produced by Laura Techera Francia and A.D Liano. The film was shot on location in Oakland, California and produced by Lucky Hat Entertainment.

== Awards ==
Everything Strange and New won the CineVision Award at the Munich International Film Festival and the Fipresci (International Federation of Film Critics) Award at the 2009 San Francisco Film Festival. The Film was also nominated for Best First Feature at the 26th Independent Spirit Awards in 2010 and for a Gotham Award in the categories of Best Breakthrough Director and Best Film Not Playing at a Theater Near You.
