= Word Is Out: Stories of Some of Our Lives =

1977 film by Peter Adair

Word Is Out
- Theatrical release poster
- Directed by: Mariposa Film Group; Peter Adair; Nancy Adair; Andrew Brown; Rob Epstein; Lucy Massie Phenix; Veronica Selver
- Produced by: Peter Adair; Andrew Brown; Rob Epstein; Lucy Massie Phenix; Veronica Selver
- Cinematography: Nancy Adair; Peter Adair; Andrew Brown; Rob Epstein; Lucy Massie Phenix; Veronica Selver
- Edited by: Nancy Adair; Peter Adair; Andrew Brown; Rob Epstein; Lucy Massie Phenix; Veronica Selver
- Music by: Trish Nugent; Buena Vista Band
- Distributed by: New Yorker Films
- Release date: November 1977
- Running time: 124 minutes (original); 133 minutes (2008 restored version)
- Language: English

Word Is Out: Stories of Some of Our Lives is a 1977 documentary film featuring interviews with 26 gay men and women. It was directed by six people collectively known as the Mariposa Film Group. Peter Adair conceived and produced the film, and was one of the directors. The film premiered in November 1977 at the Castro Theatre in San Francisco and went into limited national release in 1978. It also aired on many PBS stations in 1978.

The interviews from the film were transcribed into a book of the same title, which was published in October 1978.

In 2022, the film was selected for preservation in the United States National Film Registry by the Library of Congress as being "culturally, historically, or aesthetically significant".

== Film description ==
Word Is Out intercuts interviews with 26 people, who speak about their experiences as gay men and lesbians. The interviewees range in age from 18 to 77, in locations from San Francisco to New Mexico to Boston, in types from bee-hived housewife to student to conservative businessman to sultry drag queen, and in race from Caucasian to Hispanic, African-American, and Asian. Writer Elsa Gidlow, professor Sally Gearhart, inventor John Burnside, civil rights leader Harry Hay, actress Pat Bond, and avant-garde filmmaker Nathaniel Dorsky are among the people interviewed.

The interviewees describe their experiences of coming out; falling in and out of love; and struggling against prejudice, stereotypes, and discriminatory laws.

== Production ==
Word Is Out took five years, over 200 interviews, and six co-directors to make. Documentary filmmaker Peter Adair came up with the idea for the film. According to Adair:

In the 1970s when the modern gay movement was just beginning, our biggest problem was invisibility. Who homosexuals were was largely determined by straight people. It was bad enough that the public image of gay men and lesbians was defined largely by stereotypes — after all, I want other people to have an accurate picture of who I am. But these stereotypes created by outsiders largely defined our perceptions of who we thought we were. What a state of affairs. One's reference for "What was Gay?" was a few nasty images, and, if you were lucky, your immediate circle of queer friends.

Word Is Out, finished in 1977, was on its surface a very simple idea answering the simple question, "Who Are We?" For the film, I, and the five other principle [sic] people I worked with spent a year doing research interviews on videotape of 250 lesbians and gay men all across the country. In the end, twenty-two were chosen to tell their stories in the film.

The directors of the film, collectively known as the Mariposa Film Group, were Peter Adair, Nancy Adair, Andrew Brown, Rob Epstein, Lucy Massie Phenix, and Veronica Selver. An initial investment of $30,000 was raised from people who believed in the idea and wanted to see the film made, and assistants were hired and production began. The original number of interviewees was only eight people, but when the trial film was screened to test audiences, the response and interest generated indicated that a much larger and more diverse cross-section of interviewees was desirable. Several more years were then spent in filming the rest of the interviews, and intercutting them with each other to create the final product.

== Impact ==
"In 1978, Word Is Out: Stories of Some of Our Lives startled audiences across the country when it appeared in movie theaters and on PBS television. It was the first feature-length documentary about lesbian and gay identity made by gay filmmakers, and had a large and pioneering impact when it was released. The film became an icon of the emerging gay rights movement of the 1970s." "The silence of gay people on the screen has been broken," Vito Russo declared in The Advocate, a national gay magazine.

"When audiences saw the film, thousands wrote to the Mariposa Film Group's post office box number listed in the end credits to express how much the film meant to them — and many of them related how viewing the film saved their lives." "People who were alone and hopeless in Idaho, Utah and Kansas for the first time saw realistic and positive images of gay people on screen," said production assistant Janet Cole.

In the New York Times, David Dunlop wrote in 1996: "Understated though it was, Word Is Out had a remarkable impact, coming at a time when images of homosexuals as everyday people, as opposed to psychopaths or eccentrics, were rare."

In 2011, a book examining the film's impact was published, titled Word Is Out: A Queer Film Classic by Greg Youmans.

On review aggregator website Rotten Tomatoes, the film holds a score of 100% based on 17 reviews, with an average rating of 7.9/10.

In 2022, the film was selected for preservation in the United States National Film Registry by the Library of Congress as being "culturally, historically, or aesthetically significant".

== Book ==
Word Is Out in book form (1978)

In 1978, a book containing transcripts of the interviews was published, under the same title. The book also details how the film and book were created by the successful collective.

Word Is Out: Stories of Some of Our Lives was one of the first gay-focused nonfiction books sympathetic to gays published in the U.S. The book reached many people who were unable to view the film, and remained a popular gay nonfiction text for many years, helping many gays and lesbians realize that they were not alone.

The book also helped members of the heterosexual community to relate to the normalcy of homosexual lives, and to also understand gay persons' struggles, pain, marginalization, ostracism, professional concerns, and frustrating need for secrecy when in a climate of homophobia and illegality.

== Restoration of the film and DVD release ==
For the 30th anniversary, a restored and remastered 133-minute version of the film, which had no viable print remaining, was produced by Outfest and the UCLA Film and Television Archive, and premiered on 26 June 2008, at the Frameline Film Festival at the Castro Theater in San Francisco.

The DVD edition of the documentary, featuring the restored and remastered digital print of the original film, was released in June 2010 by Milestone Films. As special features, the DVD includes exclusive updates on the cast and the filmmakers plus an homage to Peter Adair, the originator and producer of Word Is Out, who died of AIDS in 1996.

Both the restoration and the DVD release were funded by gay activist and philanthropist David Bohnett, via his David Bohnett Foundation. On the DVD's special features, Bohnett speaks briefly about the film's impact.

== See also ==
- List of LGBT-related films
