= Peter Adair =

American filmmaker and artist (1943–1996)

Peter Adair (November 25, 1943 – June 27, 1996) was a filmmaker and artist, best known for his pioneering gay and lesbian documentary Word Is Out: Stories of Some of Our Lives (1977).

== Early life ==
Adair was born in Los Angeles County in 1943. He grew up in New Mexico, where his father, John, was an anthropologist who studied the Navajo people. He went to Antioch College (based in Yellow Springs, Ohio).

== Career ==
Adair entered the film industry in the 1960s and first gained critical attention with his 1967 documentary Holy Ghost People, a film record of a Pentecostal snake handler worship service in the Appalachians. After he realised he was gay, he decided to make a film about it. From 1975 to 1977, he collaborated with his lesbian sister Nancy Adair and other members of the Mariposa Film Group to produce and direct Word Is Out: Stories of Some of Our Lives. The film, the first of its kind to present gays and lesbians in a positive light, was a critical hit nationwide. Word Is Out inspired Nancy to collaborate with Casey Adair, Peter and Nancy's mother, on a companion book, published in 1978. Peter Adair always chose the subject matter for his film based on his current passions, and Word Is Out was as much a vital part of his own coming out process as it was an attempt to show gays and lesbians in a very human and non-sensational manner.

In 1984 Adair produced and directed Stopping History, which examined ethical questions around nuclear weapons. Then in 1984 acted as consultant and did additional camerawork on The Times of Harvey Milk, directed by his former protégé Rob Epstein. That same year he worked with the Project Read adult literacy program of the San Francisco Public Library to produce a series of tutoring videos.

In 1986, he made "Modern Selling", a tongue-in-cheek industrial film, made in a mock-'40s style, that shows bank loan officers how to treat their female clients.

=== Late career ===
As he began to see his friends in the art and film communities succumb to the plague of AIDS, Adair co-directed, with Rob Epstein, The AIDS Show: Artists Involved in Death and Survival, one of the first films to examine AIDS' impact on the arts community, in 1986. When he became aware of his own HIV status, he wrote and directed Absolutely Positive in 1991, an examination of how asymptomatic HIV positive people live with uncertainty. The 11 interviewees are seen at different stages of the disease and how they are coping with their illnesses in different ways. Peter and his producer Janet Cole, had interviewed 120 people before selecting the 11 most interesting including; Doris, a soprano in her Baptist church choir who discovered she was HIV positive when her baby son was diagnosed with AIDS; Gregg, a gay San Francisco-based model, and Juan, a young husband and father who was infected by his late first wife, a drug addict.

In 1995, Adair and Haney Armstrong completed "In the First Degree," an interactive CD-ROM featuring live actors. It was published by Broderbund Software.

In January 1996, he received The Frameline Award (Given in San Francisco to a person or entity that has made a major contribution to LGBT representation in film, television, or the media arts).

In June 1996, Adair succumbed to complications of AIDS at the age of 52 in Bernal Heights, San Francisco.

== Awards ==
He won many awards, including the Columbia-Dupont Citation for Broadcast Excellence, Golden Gate Award, EMMY, James D. Phelan Award, Distinguished Documentary Achievement, Blue Ribbon, Red Ribbon, American Film Festival and the Prix l'Age d'Or.
