= Wade Randolph Hampton =

American DJ

Wade Randolph Hampton, professionally known as W, also known as WishFM), is an American DJ, film and music producer, and recording artist.

== Career ==
In 1987, Hampton and mentor Kerry Jaggers opened the nightclub, Westend, in Austin. He moved to Chicago a year later, before relocating to Los Angeles.

While in Los Angeles and later in San Francisco, Hampton became involved in the West Coast rave scene. Along with then-partner Stephanie Smiley, he founded Faster Bamboo, a shop "designed to provide hard-to-find cutting-edge music and underground club info".

In 1995, Hampton signed a record label distribution deal with Moonshine Music to launch Domestic Recordings, through which he released music under the names ‘W’ and ‘Wish FM’. He also released albums from acts such as Mark Farina, Symbiosis, and Westside Chemical. After moving to San Francisco, he found success with his weekly night ‘La Belle Epoque’ at 'The Top' nightclub.

From 2006 to 2012, Hampton was Director of Dallas’ 'Ghostbar' nightclub, located on top of the W Hotel.

=== Film and television ===
Hampton made his acting debut in the independent film Groove (2000), for which he also served as music producer. Groove was nominated for ‘Best Film Under $500,000’ at the 17th Independent Spirit Awards.

Hampton was also the Music Supervisor for the 2006 film TV Junkie, which won the ‘Special Grand Jury Prize for a Documentary’ at the Sundance Film Festival.

== Personal life ==
Hampton grew up in Dallas, Texas. He currently resides in Los Angeles and has a son from his relationship with Stephanie Smiley.

In the 1990s, Hampton befriended psychologist Timothy Leary and later DJ'ed at Leary's funeral memorial.

== Discography ==
Year	Release	Artist	Credit	Label	Catalog number
1996	Wish FM 96.1 The Progressive Electro Revolution	Various	Producer/Executive Producer	Domestic Recordings	DMT 10001–2
1996	Jet Set	Various	DJ/ Producer	Domestic Recordings	DMT 10004–2
1996	Clandestine Electronic Subculture	Symbiosis	Executive Producer	Domestic Recordings	DMT 10003–2
1996	Seasons One	Mark Farina	Producer/Executive Producer	Domestic Recordings	DMT 10002–2
1997	Wish FM 97.1: West Coast Drum & Space	Various	DJ/Producer	Domestic Recordings	DMT 10005–2
1997	Blue	Infinite Posse	Remix Co-Producer	Sunburn Records/Lightyear Entertainment	SPF 009 / 54274–0
1997	Phibsborough	Westside Chemical	Executive Producer	Domestic Recordings/Stray Records	DMT 10006-2 / SR2700
1998	Wish FM 98.1: Live At La Belle Epoque	Various	DJ/Producer	Sunburn Records/Lightyear Entertainment/ Warner Entertainment Group	SPF 19004/54285-2
1998	Redheadestepchild	W	Writer/Arranger/Engineer	ZoëMagik Records	ZM CD005
1998	Meta	Symbiosis	Producer/Executive Producer	Domestic Recordings / Silent	DMT 10007-2 / SR9837
1998	Duke's Up	W	Writer/Producer	ZoëMagik Records	ZM-017
1999	Stepheadedredchild - The Remix Sessions	W	Writer/Arranger/Engineer/Remixer	ZoëMagik Records	ZM CD006
2000	Groove (Music From And Inspired By The Motion Picture)	Various	DJ/Executive Producer	Kinetic/Reprise Records/ Warner Entertainment Group	9 47765-2 / 947765–2
1997	The Royal Treatment	The Baroness	Remixer	ZoeMagik Records	ZMCD-003
2002	Requiem For A Dream (Remixed)	Clint Mansell Featuring Kronos Quartet	Remixer	Thrive Records	90703–2
