= The Thompsons =

- Directed by: The Butcher Brothers
- Written by: Mitchell Altieri; Cory Knauf
- Produced by: Mitchell Altieri; Phil Flores; Travis Stevens; Snowfort Pictures; Rob Weston
- Starring: Cory Knauf; Samuel Child; Joseph McKelheer; Mackenzie Firgens
- Music by: KK (Kevin Kerrigan)
- Release date: 26 August 2012 (London FrightFest)
- Running time: 82 minutes
- Language: English

The Thompsons is an independent 2012 horror film directed by the Butcher Brothers (Mitchell Altieri and Phil Flores) and produced by Rob Weston of Straightwire Entertainment Group and Travis Stevens of Snowfort Pictures. It is a sequel to the Butcher Brothers previous film The Hamiltons. It premiered at the London FrightFest Film Festival on August 26, 2012.

Filmed largely in the UK, several scenes feature The Ringlestone Inn Near Harrietsham, in Kent, south-east of London.

== Premise ==
On the run from the law, the vampire family, the Hamiltons (now known as the Thompsons), heads to England to find an ancient vampire clan known as the Stuarts. Unbeknownst to the Hamiltons, the Stuarts have motives of their own.

== Cast ==
- Cory Knauf as Francis Thompson
- Elizabeth Henstridge as Riley Stuart
- Mackenzie Firgens as Darlene Thompson
- Ryan Hartwig as Lenny Thompson
- Samuel Child as David Thompson
- Sean Browne as Cole Stuart
- Tom Holloway as Ian Stuart
- Joseph McKelheer as Wendell Thompson
- Daniel O'Meara as Father Stuart
- Selina Giles as Mother Stuart
- Sean Cronin as Cyrus
- Andrei Alen as Sven (Swedish dude)
- Katarina Gellin as Ingrid (Swedish girl)

== Reception ==
Beyond Hollywood wrote, "The Thompsons is very much a pleasant surprise, an entertaining and reasonably well crafted modern vampire tale. Though a little bit True Blood, the film is considerably more engaging than most others of its type, boosted by a likeable returning cast. The film’s real strengths are its surprisingly human script (written by the Butcher Brothers and Knauf) and solid character work, both of which help to keep the viewer involved".
