= Star Light (film) =

- Directed by: The Butcher Brothers
- Written by: Mitchell Altieri; Jamal M. Jennings; Adam Weis
- Produced by: Jeffrey Allard
- Starring: Cameron Johnson; Scout Taylor-Compton; Tiffany Shepis
- Release date: 2020
- Country: United States
- Language: English

Star Light is a 2020 horror movie from Orama Filmworks and The Butcher Brothers. The film stars Cameron Johnson, Scout Taylor-Compton, Bret Roberts, Rahart Adams, Garrett Westton and Liana Ramirez. Tiffany Shepis has a cameo.

The film is directed by Mitchell Altieri, Lee Cummings and written by Mitchell Altieri, Jamal M. Jennings and Adam Weis.

Filming began in October 2017 in Kentucky, United States.

The film was first shown at the Hollywood Reel Independent Film Festival in February 2020.

== Plot ==
Teenager Dylan (Cameron Johnson) accidentally crashes into a popular singer Bebe A. Love (Scout Taylor-Compton). Dylan and his friends try to help Bebe, but unexplained events and weird people turn a graduation party into hell on Earth.

== Production ==
The executive producer of the film is Jeffrey Allard, best known for his work on The Texas Chain Saw Massacre.

== Reception ==
It received a 57% approval rating on review aggregator website Rotten Tomatoes, based on seven reviews.
