= Consumed (2024 film) =

- Directed by: Mitchell Altieri
- Written by: David Calbert
- Starring: Devon Sawa
- Distributed by: Brainstorm Media
- Release date: August 16, 2024
- Running time: 89 minutes
- Country: United States
- Language: English

Consumed is a 2024 American horror film written by David Calbert, directed by Mitchell Altieri and starring Devon Sawa.

== Cast ==
- Courtney Halverson as Beth
- Mark Famiglietti as Jay
- Devon Sawa as Quinn

== Release ==
The film was released in theaters and on demand on August 16, 2024.

== Reception ==
The film has a 31% rating on Rotten Tomatoes based on 12 reviews. Paul Lê of Bloody Disgusting awarded the film two "skulls" out of five. Simon Abrams of RogerEbert.com awarded the film two stars out of four. Matthew Donato of Collider rated the film a 5 out of 10.
