= Brendan McCarthy (actor) =

American actor

Brendan McCarthy is an American actor known for his roles in True Blood, Justified, Shooter, and others.

== Background ==
Born in Camp Pendleton, California, McCarthy attended Cathedral Catholic High School and earned a Bachelor of Science degree in business management from the University of San Diego. During college, McCarthy played on the San Diego Toreros baseball team. After graduating from college, he moved to Los Angeles and got his first role in 61*.

== Filmography ==
=== Film ===
Year	Title	Role	Notes
2005	The Works	Rick	
2005	2001 Maniacs	Rufus	
2011	Poolboy: Drowning Out the Fury	Paramedic Sir Larry Haverford	
2012	A Green Story	Thomas	
2013	Holy Ghost People	Wayne	
2015	Self/less	Anton 2	
2015	Helen Keller vs. Nightwolves	Matthew	
2016	Hidden Truth	Pace	
2016	A Life Lived	Alex	
2016	Undocumented	SWAT Commander	
2019	Most Likely to Murder	Harlen	
TBA	Demon Lake	Auggie	

=== Television ===
Year	Title	Role	Notes
2001	61*	Johnny Blanchard	Television film
2001	When Good Ghouls Go Bad	Curtis Danko	Television film
2010	Rizzoli & Isles	The Apprentice	Episode: "See One, Do One, Teach One"
2011–2012	True Blood	Nate	8 episodes
2012	Justified	Tanner Dodd	6 episodes
2012	GCB	Cowboy	Episode: "A Wolf in Sheep's Clothing"
2012	The Mentalist	Lance Gladstone	Episode: "So Long, and Thanks for All the Red Snapper"
2013	Defiance	Hunter Bell	Episode: "The Bride Wore Black"
2014	Legends	Ellroy Streeter	Episode: "Pilot"
2015	Chicago P.D.	Vince Parker	Episode: "What Puts You on That Ledge"
2015	Earthfall	Carl	Television film
2016	NCIS	Owen Dixon	Episode: "React"
2017	Shooter	Bo Winnick	4 episodes
2018	Grace and Frankie	Norbert	Episode: "The Home"
2018	American Horror Story: Apocalypse	Detective Monroe	Episode: "Could It Be... Satan?"
2020	9-1-1: Lone Star	Craig	Episode: "Studs"
2024	Grotesquerie	Nick	Episode: "Red Haze"
