= Mitchell Altieri =

American film director

- Born: United States
- Other name: The Butcher Brothers
- Occupations: Film director, film producer, screenwriter

Mitchell Altieri is an American film director, producer and writer.

== Career ==
His first feature film Lurking in Suburbia was discovered by Sundance Film Festival programmer Trevor Groth. Altieri and long time film partner Phil Flores then created their filmmaking alter-egos The Butcher Brothers, writing and directing the independent horror film The Hamiltons.

== Filmography ==
- Consumed (2024)
- Star Light (2020)
- The Night Watchmen (2017)
- A Beginner's Guide to Snuff (2016)
- Raised by Wolves (2014)
- Holy Ghost People (2013)
- The Thompsons (2012)
- The Violent Kind (2010)
- April Fool's Day (2008)
- The Hamiltons (2006)
- Lurking in Suburbia (2006)
- Long Cut (2002)
