= Break (2008 film) =

- Directed by: Marc Clebanoff
- Written by: Marc Clebanoff
- Produced by: Joseph Isgro; Luca Palanca
- Starring: Frank Kreuger; Sarah Thompson; Chad Everett; David Carradine; Charles Durning; Michael Madsen; James Russo
- Cinematography: Tim Otholt
- Edited by: Ran Ballard
- Music by: Peter DiStefano
- Distributed by: Full Force Films
- Release dates: June 2008 (STIFF); May 1, 2009 (United States)
- Country: United States
- Language: English
- Budget: $750,000

Break is a 2008 action drama film starring Chad Everett, Sarah Thompson, Michael Madsen and James Russo.

== Plot ==
A terminally ill crime boss, known only as The Man, hires a hit man named Frank to carry out his own assassination as well as the assassination of The Woman he loves. When The Woman turns out to be Frank's long lost lover, he turns against The Man becoming the target himself.

== Cast ==
- Frank Krueger as Frank
- Sarah Thompson as The Woman
- Chad Everett as The Man
- Mackenzie Firgens as The Mysterious Brunette
- Michael Madsen as The Associate
- Charles Durning as The Wise Man
- Matthew Jones as Haiku
- James Russo as The Father
- David Carradine as The Bishop

== Reception ==
It won Best Drama at the Action On Film International Film Festival.
