= Quality of Life (film) =

- DVD cover
- Directed by: Benjamin Morgan
- Written by: Brian Burnam; Benjamin Morgan
- Produced by: Brant Smith; Benjamin Morgan; Meika Rouda
- Starring: Lane Garrison; Brian Burnam
- Cinematography: Kev Robertson
- Edited by: Sharon Franklin
- Distributed by: The Relentless Company
- Release dates: February 8, 2004 (Berlinale); June 11, 2004 (United States)
- Running time: 85 minutes
- Country: United States
- Language: English

Quality of Life, also known as Against the Wall, is a 2004 drama film about the story of two graffiti writers in the Mission District of San Francisco. Directed by Benjamin Morgan, Quality of Life stars Lane Garrison, Brian Burnam, Luis Saguar and Mackenzie Firgens. Morgan co-wrote the screenplay with Burnam, who is a former graffiti writer. The film was shot and edited in the Mission District, home to one of the world's most active and influential graffiti scenes.

The film was shown only at film festivals in 2004 and went into limited release October 12, 2005.

== Cast ==
- Lane Garrison as Heir
- Brian Burnam as Vain
- Luis Saguar as Pops
- Mackenzie Firgens as Lisa
- Fred Pitts as Robert
- Andrew A. Rolfes as Officer Charles
- Tajai as Dino
- Bryna Weiss as Grandma
- Timothy Garcia as Jimmy "Tad"
- Ezra J. Stanley as Kid

== Awards ==
- Special Mention jury award, Berlin International Film Festival
- Best Youth Film, Stockholm International Film Festival Jr.

== Soundtrack ==
No official soundtrack was released, but these tracks were included in the film:

- Andre Nickatina - The Soul of a Coke Dealer
- Hi Fi Drowning - Big Spring
- Bonobo - Noctuary
- Maroons - Best Bonus Beat
- Top.R. - Soul Cancer
- Hi Fi Drowning - Atomatic
- Halou - Tube Fed
- Halou - Milkdrunk
- MR Lif - New man Theme
- Bonobo - Change Down
- Amon Tobin - Get Your Snack On
- Lifesavas - Soldierfied
- Meat Beat Manifesto feat. DJ Collage - Echo in Space Dub
- Meat Beat Manifesto - Asbestos Lead Asbestos (toxic mix)
- Calhoun (Tim Locke) - Sunken Eyes, Shakey Knees
- Modest Mouse - BROKE
- Hi Fi Drowning - Dim
- Halou - Honey Thief
- Sebadoh - License to Confuse
- Good Riddance - The Hardest Part
- Freedy Johnston - This Perfect World
- Built To Spill - Weather
- 8 Stories - In Sleep
