= Groove (film) =

- Film poster
- Directed by: Greg Harrison
- Written by: Greg Harrison
- Produced by: Greg Harrison; Danielle Renfrew
- Starring: Chris Ferreira; Mackenzie Firgens; Lola Glaudini; Denny Kirkwood; Hamish Linklater; Vincent Riverside; Rachel True; Steve Van Wormer
- Cinematography: Matthew Irving
- Edited by: Greg Harrison
- Music by: Scott Hardkiss
- Distributed by: Sony Pictures Classics
- Release dates: January 21, 2000 (Sundance); June 9, 2000 (United States)
- Running time: 86 minutes
- Country: United States
- Language: English
- Budget: $200,000

Groove is a 2000 American film directed by Greg Harrison. It portrays one night in the San Francisco underground rave scene. Through a single email, the word spreads that a huge rave is going to take place in an abandoned warehouse. John Digweed has a cameo as himself and also contributed to the soundtrack with Nick Muir, under their production alias Bedrock.

== Plot ==
Groove tells the story of an all-night rave. The film is broken up into segments according to which DJ is spinning and features real-life DJs Forest Green, WishFM, Polywog, and Digweed. Introverted aspiring writer David Turner is reluctantly dragged to a rave at a warehouse by his brother Colin. David takes ecstasy for the first time and makes a romantic connection with fellow raver, Leyla, who has newly moved to the Bay Area from New York.

== Cast ==
- Chris Ferreira as Bill
- Mackenzie Firgens as Harmony Stitts
- Lola Glaudini as Leyla Heydel
- Denny Kirkwood as Colin Turner
- Hamish Linklater as David Turner
- Steve Van Wormer as Ernie Townsend
- Rachel True as Beth Anderson
- Vincent Riverside as Anthony
- Dmitri Ponce as Guy Pritchkin
- Ari Gold as Cliff Rafferty
- Aaron Langridge as Joe Torres
- Wendy Turner-Low as Lisa Monroe
- Bradley K. Ross as Aaron Lubiarz
- Polywog as DJ Polywog
- Forest Green as DJ Forest Green
- Wade Randolph Hampton as DJ WishFM
- Monty Luke as Dancefloor DJ #5 (Cinco)
- Brian Behlendorf as Chill-out room DJ
- John Digweed as DJ Digweed
- Bing Ching as DJ Snaz
- Elizabeth Sun as Maggie McMullen
- Nick Offerman as Sergeant Channahon

== Production ==
After being turned down by studios for funding, production costs were met by selling shares of the film to investors similar to angel investment of a startup company.

The film was shot in the San Francisco area and included scenes at Pier One, Fillmore Street, China Basin, and the Bay Bridge. Principal photography took place in 24 days in August and September 1999.

== Release ==
Groove premiered at the 2000 Sundance Film Festival, where it was acquired for distribution for $1.5 million by Sony Pictures Classics. It was given a limited theatrical release on June 9, 2000.

== Reception ==
Metacritic review
breakdown (unweighted)

Positive
12 (48%)
Mixed
10 (40%)
Negative
3 (12%)

On review aggregator Rotten Tomatoes, the film holds an approval rating of 57% based on 51 reviews, with a weighted average rating of 6.1/10. The website's critical consensus reads, "Though high on energy and great techno tunes, Groove's characters and plotlines are too clichéd to be engaging." On Metacritic, the film has a weighted average score of 54 out of 100, based on 25 critics, indicating "mixed or average" reviews.

At the 16th Independent Spirit Awards, Groove was nominated for the John Cassavetes Award.

== See also ==
- Go, another film about rave culture made a year earlier
- Rave, a film about rave culture released the same year
- Human Traffic, a UK film about the rave culture made the same year
