= Holy Ghost People (1967 film) =

- Directed by: Peter Adair
- Produced by: Blair Boyd
- Narrated by: Peter Adair
- Production company: Thistle Films
- Distributed by: Contemporary Films
- Release date: 1967
- Running time: 53 minutes
- Country: United States
- Language: English

Holy Ghost People is a 1967 American documentary film directed and narrated by Peter Adair. It is about the service of a Pentecostal church near Gauley Bridge, West Virginia (renamed "Scrabble Creek, West Virginia" in the film, though it is not an actual town). The church service includes faith healing, snake handling, speaking in tongues and singing. This documentary has entered the public domain and is available at the Internet Archive.

== Summary ==
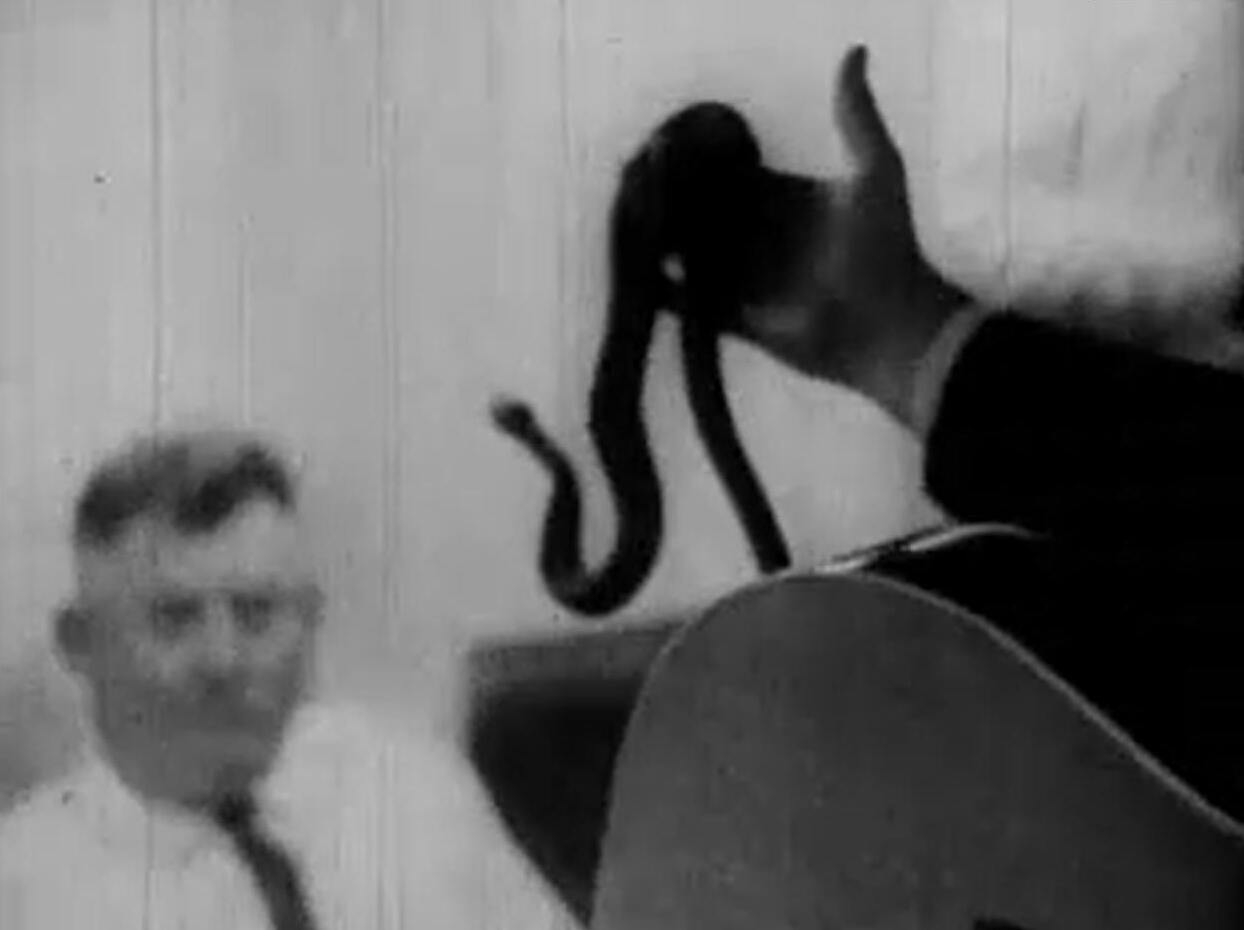
Snake handling scene in the documentary

The documentary begins by showing the audience various images of the church and its night services. After the opening credits, a narrator introduces the Pentecostal community in Scrabble Creek, West Virginia. The narrator presents various activities the church partakes in, such as snake handling, speaking in tongues, and four- to six-hour-long meetings at the church multiple times a week. The narrators explain that while people are often bitten while handling the snakes, mainly copperheads, they refuse medical help.

The documentary then features several one-on-one interviews from various members of the church. These interviews reveal stories of how many of the church's members found salvation through the Holy Ghost and how the Holy Ghost saves them in their daily lives. Some members reveal stories of how they are able to speak in tongues; others reveal how they communicate with God, who sometimes paralyzes them. The final interview is of an old woman who shakes and sometimes convulses on camera while going in and out of speaking in tongues.

The film then cuts to the beginning of a church service. As men enter the church, they go up and kiss each other on the lips before they are seated. After everyone is seated, people start clapping and singing together. Then there is a cut to the pastor talking to the congregation. He invites those who have not found the Holy Ghost to find out. He also tells the congregation to ignore the cameraman and to act as though it was just another normal night. The pastor continues his sermon, and the documentary uses various cuts to show that a long period of time has passed.

Eventually, the church service moves into a time of prayer. The people stand and announce their prayer concerns to the congregation. The pastor tells people that God will answer their prayers if they only believe. They then bring a woman, who is rapidly losing her eyesight, to the front of the church to pray for. The camera pans to the rest of the church and shows that everyone else has formed into small groups and are all praying at the same time. The different styles of prayer include standing still, lying on the floor, and convulsing seemingly uncontrollably.

The end of the film contains a lot of fast cuts in order to show everything that happened in the service. A new man preaches, followed by two people who lead the congregation in worship. After clapping and singing, snakes are brought out to the snake handlers. As the music and clapping continue, people begin to get up and dance. Various people throughout the church handle several snakes, and a man who dances violently quickly collapses to the ground and lies there. No one rushes to help him. The music stops so that people can provide testimonies and the church can take an offering. The pastor handles a snake as he tries to get people to give money to the church. The snake bites the pastor on the hand. The film ends with a shot of the pastor's swollen hand.

== Cast ==
- Peter Adair, Narrator
- Elza O. Preast, Self, Reverend

== Reception ==
Gary Morris of Bright Lights Film Journal quoted Margaret Mead as having called it "one of the best ethnographic films ever made".

== Legacy ==
It was a partial inspiration for the 2013 film Holy Ghost People, and some of its footage was used. It is also used in anthropology and documentary film classes.

== See also ==
- List of films in the public domain in the United States
