= Lurking in Suburbia =

- Directed by: Mitchell Altieri
- Written by: Mitchell Altieri
- Produced by: The Butcher Brothers
- Starring: Joe Egender; Samuel Child; Ari Zaragis; Buffy Charlet
- Distributed by: Heretic Films; Ryko Distribution
- Release date: May 30, 2006
- Running time: 87 minutes
- Country: United States
- Language: English

Lurking in Suburbia is a 2006 comedy film written and directed by Mitchell Altieri, produced by Altieri and Phil Flores, and starring Joe Egender, Samuel Child, Ari Zaragis, and Buffy Charlet.

== Plot ==
On his thirtieth birthday, Conrad Stevens, a small-time writer, becomes disenchanted with his immature lifestyle and begins to wonder if there's more to life than partying and casual sex.

== Cast ==
- Joe Egender as Conrad
- Samuel Child as Sean
- Ari Zaragis as Danny
- and Buffy Charlet as Frankie
- Riley Plattner as punk store kid

== Release ==
Lurking in Suburbia was released on DVD on May 30, 2006.

== Reception ==
Variety dismissed the film as "yet another depiction of the collective anomie felt by a group of thirtysomething friends clinging to their high-school glory days. Tyro writer-director Mitchell Altieri's thin, but occasionally engaging pic plods along a path well-trodden by indie filmmakers of the '90s, particularly Whit Stillman and Noah Baumbach, while never amassing the rich characterizations or pointed insights that have distinguished this genre's more memorable efforts." Don R. Lewis of Film Threat rated it 4/5 stars and wrote, "Lurking in Suburbia isn’t a perfect film, but it's a damn good one." Scott Weinberg of DVD Talk rated it 4/5 stars and described it as "a sly, personal, and low-key indie comedy that manages to become more accessible and likable the longer it goes on." David Johnson of DVD Verdict called it "an authentic, lighthearted, well-acted look at one guy's struggles with growing up."
