= Danielle Renfrew =

American film producer (born 1973)

- Born: 1973 (age 52–53)
- Other name: Danielle Renfrew Behrens
- Occupation: Producer
- Years active: 1998-present

Danielle Renfrew Behrens (born 1973), or Danielle Renfrew, is an independent film producer. She previously served as the head of Animal Pictures alongside Natasha Lyonne and Maya Rudolph. Animal Pictures' releases include comedy special Sarah Cooper: Everything’s Fine and film Sirens, which was selected for Sundance Film Festival 2022.

== Filmography ==
She has premiered 10 films at the Sundance Film Festival, including Grandma starring Lily Tomlin, as well as Kurt Cobain: Montage Of Heck, which received seven prime-time Emmy Award Nominations. Other credits include Lauren Greenfield’s The Queen of Versailles, which was the opening night film of Sundance's 2012 film festival and received the Grand Jury Prize for Directing, Fox Searchlight’s Waitress, and Sony Pictures Classics' November and Groove.

Danielle is a Sundance Women's Initiative Fellow and has served as an Advisor to Sundance's Creative Producing Program and Film Independent's Filmmaker Labs. She launched Superlative in 2016.

== Personal life ==
Since 2012, Behrens has lived in Boulder, Colorado with her husband, Tom, and two children.
