= The Butcher Brothers =

American filmmaker duo

- Born: United States
- Other names: Mitchell Altieri; Phil Flores
- Occupations: Film directors, film producers, screenwriters

The Butcher Brothers are the filmmaking alter-egos of American film directors Mitchell Altieri and Phil Flores.

== Biography ==
=== Phil Flores ===
Flores's first film was Long Cut (2002); he then joined with Mitchell Altieri to produce Lurking in Suburbia (2006).

=== Mitchell Altieri ===
Altieri's first feature film Lurking in Suburbia was discovered by Sundance Film Festival programmer Trevor Groth. Altieri and long time film partner Phil Flores then created their filmmaking alter-egos The Butcher Brothers, writing and directing the independent horror film The Hamiltons. His latest film, directed solo, is Holy Ghost People. As of April 2013, Raised by Wolves was completing post-production.

== History ==
Their first feature film The Hamiltons was the co-winner of the Gold Vision Award of the Santa Barbara International Film Festival and the Jury Prize at the Malibu International Film Festival. It was released by Lions Gate Entertainment in 2006 (Limited Theatrical) and 2007 (DVD). Their influences include Tobe Hooper, David Cronenberg, and David Lynch.

In 2007, they filmed the video for the Static-X song "Destroyer". They shot the horror film The Violent Kind, which was part of the Sundance Film Festival 2010. Next, the Butcher Brothers worked on Black Sunset, a psychological thriller, which was produced by Cynthia Stafford of Queen Nefertari Prod. They released the sequel to The Hamiltons, The Thompsons, in 2012. In 2014 they released Black Sunset.

== Filmography ==
- The Hamiltons (2006)
- April Fool's Day (2008)
- The Violent Kind (2010)
- The Thompsons (2012)
- Black Sunset (2014)
- Star Light (2020)
