= List of American films of 2001 =

This is a list of American films released in 2001.

== Box office ==
The highest-grossing American films released in 2001, by domestic box office gross revenue, are as follows:

Highest-grossing films of 2001
Rank	Title	Distributor	Domestic gross
1	Harry Potter and the Philosopher's Stone	Warner Bros. Pictures	$317,575,550
2	The Lord of the Rings: The Fellowship of the Ring	New Line Cinema	$313,364,114
3	Shrek	DreamWorks Distribution	$267,851,831
4	Monsters, Inc.	Disney	$255,873,250
5	Rush Hour 2	New Line Cinema	$226,164,286
6	The Mummy Returns	Universal Pictures	$202,007,640
7	Pearl Harbor	Disney	$198,542,554
8	Ocean's Eleven	Warner Bros. Pictures	$183,417,150
9	Jurassic Park III	Universal Pictures	$181,171,875
10	Planet of the Apes	20th Century Fox	$180,011,740

== January–March ==
Opening		Title	Production company	Cast and crew	Ref.
J A N U A R Y	12	Antitrust	Metro-Goldwyn-Mayer / Hyde Park Entertainment	Peter Howitt (director); Howard Franklin (screenplay); Ryan Phillippe, Tim Robbins, Rachael Leigh Cook, Claire Forlani, Douglas McFerran, Richard Roundtree, Tygh Runyan, Yee Jee Tso, Nate Dushku, Ned Bellamy, Tyler Labine, Scott Bellis, David Lovgren, Zahf Hajee, Jonathon Young, Peter Howitt, Gregor Trpin	
J A N U A R Y	12	Double Take	Touchstone Pictures	George Gallo (director/screenplay); Eddie Griffin, Orlando Jones, Edward Herrmann, Gary Grubbs, Garcelle Beauvais, Andrea Navedo, Shawn Elliott, Sterling Macer Jr., Benny Nieves, Daniel Roebuck, Vivica A. Fox, Brent Briscoe, Carlos Carrasco, Robby Robinson, Ted White, Tony Genaro, Mei Melançon, Donna Eskra, Frank Pesce, Julie Lott	
J A N U A R Y	12	Save the Last Dance	Paramount Pictures / MTV Productions	Thomas Carter (director); Duane Adler, Cheryl Edwards (screenplay); Julia Stiles, Sean Patrick Thomas, Kerry Washington, Fredro Starr, Terry Kinney, Bianca Lawson, Elizabeth Oas, Vince Green, Garland Whitt	
J A N U A R Y	19	The Amati Girls	Providence Entertainment	Anne De Salvo (director/screenplay); Mercedes Ruehl, Paul Sorvino, Cloris Leachman, Lee Grant, Mark Harmon, Sean Young, Dinah Manoff, Jamey Sheridan, Sam McMurray, Matt Winston, Sal Viscuso, Anna Berger, John Capodice, Robert Picardo, Carol Ann Susi, Jay Acovone, Sean Huze, Lily Knight, Edith Fields, Cassie Cole, Marissa Leigh, Joe Greco, Mary Hershberger, Anne De Salvo, Don Marino, Kivi Rogers, Asher Gold, Kyle Sabihy, Jessica Sara, Doug Spinuzza, Anthony Pontrello	
J A N U A R Y	19	The Pledge	Warner Bros. Pictures / Morgan Creek Productions / Franchise Pictures	Sean Penn (director); Jerzy Kromolowski, Mary Olson-Kromolowski (screenplay); Jack Nicholson, Aaron Eckhart, Helen Mirren, Robin Wright, Vanessa Redgrave, Sam Shepard, Benicio del Toro, Patricia Clarkson, Tom Noonan, Mickey Rourke, Harry Dean Stanton, Dale Dickey, Costas Mandylor, Michael O'Keefe, Lois Smith, Brittany Tiplady, Eileen Ryan	
J A N U A R Y	26	Sugar & Spice	New Line Cinema	Francine McDougall (director); Mandy Nelson (screenplay); Marla Sokoloff, Marley Shelton, Mena Suvari, Melissa George, Rachel Blanchard, Alexandra Holden, Sara Marsh, James Marsden, W. Earl Brown, Sean Young, Conan O'Brien, Kurt Loder, Jerry Springer, Adam Busch, Jake Hoffman, Wiley Harker, Nate Maher, David Belenky	
J A N U A R Y	26	The Wedding Planner	Columbia Pictures / Intermedia Films / Tapestry Films	Adam Shankman (director); Michael Ellis, Pamela Falk (screenplay); Jennifer Lopez, Matthew McConaughey, Bridgette Wilson-Sampras, Justin Chambers, Judy Greer, Alex Rocco, Joanna Gleason, Charles Kimbrough, Fred Willard, Lou Myers, Frances Bay, Kevin Pollak, Kathy Najimy	
F E B R U A R Y	2	Head over Heels	Universal Pictures	Mark Waters (director); John J. Strauss, Ed Decter, David Kidd, Ron Burch (screenplay); Monica Potter, Freddie Prinze Jr., Sarah O'Hare, Shalom Harlow, Ivana Miličević, Tomiko Fraser, China Chow, Timothy Olyphant, Tanja Reichert, Jay Brazeau, Stanley DeSantis, Betty Linde, Norma MacMillan, Bethoe Shirkoff, Tom Shorthouse, Joe Pascual, J.B. Bivens	
F E B R U A R Y	2	The Invisible Circus	Fine Line Features	Adam Brooks (director/screenplay); Jordana Brewster, Christopher Eccleston, Cameron Diaz, Blythe Danner, Patrick Bergin, Isabelle Pasco, Moritz Bleibtreu, Camilla Belle, Nikola Obermann, Ricky Koole	
F E B R U A R Y	2	Malèna	Miramax Films / Medusa Film / Pacific Pictures / Tele+	Giuseppe Tornatore (director/screenplay); Monica Bellucci, Giuseppe Sulfaro, Luciano Federico, Matilde Piana, Pietro Notarianni, Gaetano Aronica, Gilberto Idonea, Angelo Pellegrino	
F E B R U A R Y	2	Valentine	Warner Bros. Pictures / Village Roadshow Pictures	Jamie Blanks (director); Donna Powers, Wayne Powers, Gretchen J. Berg, Aaron Harberts (screenplay); David Boreanaz, Denise Richards, Marley Shelton, Katherine Heigl, Jessica Capshaw, Jessica Cauffiel, Fulvio Cecere, Daniel Cosgrove, Hedy Burress, Johnny Whitworth, Adam J. Harrington, Claude Duhamel	
F E B R U A R Y	3	Dancing in September	HBO Films / Weecan Films / StarRise Entertainment	Reggie Rock Bythewood (director/screenplay); Nicole Ari Parker, Isaiah Washington, Vicellous Reon Shannon, Malinda Williams, Jay Underwood, Michael Cavanaugh, Mel Jackson, Jenifer Lewis, Marcia Cross, Estelle Harris, Juanita Jennings, Royale Watkins, Chi McBride, Markus Flanagan, Dan Martin, Constance Marie, James Avery, LeVar Burton, Anna Maria Horsford, Peter Onorati, Tichina Arnold, Jenica Bergere, Wren T. Brown, Kadeem Hardison, Brent Jennings, Suli McCullough, Johnny Messner, Rashaan Nall, Devika Parikh, Kimberly Russell, Aisha Tyler, Jascha Washington, Todd Bridges, Gary Dourdan, Matt Nolan	
F E B R U A R Y	4	Bojangles	Showtime / MGM Television	Joseph Sargent (director); Richard Wesley, Robert P. Johnson (screenplay); Gregory Hines, Peter Riegert, Kimberly Elise, Savion Glover, Jackie Richardson, Aaron Meeks, Philip Akin, Arnold Pinnock, Quancetia Hamilton, Richard Yearwood, Aaron Poole, Bill Lake, Richard Chevolleau, Maria Ricossa, Jonathan Higgins, Linette Robinson, Lea Marie Golde, Novie Edwards, Caliaf St. Aubyn, Donovan Hunter McKnight	
F E B R U A R Y	9	Hannibal	Metro-Goldwyn-Mayer / Dino De Laurentiis Company	Ridley Scott (director); David Mamet, Steven Zaillian (screenplay); Anthony Hopkins, Julianne Moore, Gary Oldman, Ray Liotta, Frankie R. Faison, Giancarlo Giannini, Francesca Neri, Željko Ivanek, Hazelle Goodman, Robert Rietti, David Andrews, Francis Guinan, Mark Margolis, Enrico Lo Verso, Ivano Marescotti, Danielle de Niese, Boyd Kestner, Fabrizio Gifuni, Marco Greco, Terry Serpico, Peter Shaw, Don McManus, Ennio Coltorti, Ajay Naidu, Bruce MacVittie, Giannina Facio, Judie Aronson, Chuck Jeffreys	
F E B R U A R Y	9	Saving Silverman	Columbia Pictures / Village Roadshow Pictures	Dennis Dugan (director); Hank Nelken, Greg DePaul (screenplay); Jason Biggs, Steve Zahn, Jack Black, Amanda Peet, Amanda Detmer, R. Lee Ermey, Neil Diamond	
F E B R U A R Y	16	Down to Earth	Paramount Pictures / Village Roadshow Pictures / Alphaville Films	Chris Weitz, Paul Weitz (directors); Chris Rock, Lance Crouther, Ali LeRoi, Louis C.K. (screenplay); Chris Rock, Regina King, Mark Addy, Eugene Levy, Frankie R. Faison, Greg Germann, Jennifer Coolidge, Chazz Palminteri, Wanda Sykes, John Cho, Mario Joyner, Brian Rhodes, Laz Alonso, Tisha Campbell, Telma Hopkins, Mustafa Shakir, Arnold Pinnock, Colin Fox	
F E B R U A R Y	16	Recess: School's Out	Walt Disney Pictures	Chuck Sheetz (director); Jonathan Greenberg (screenplay); Andrew Lawrence, Rickey D'Shon Collins, Jason Davis, Ashley Johnson, Courtland Mead, Pamela Segall, Dabney Coleman, Melissa Joan Hart, April Winchell, James Woods, Robert Goulet, Peter MacNicol, Diedrich Bader, Allyce Beasley, Gregg Berger, Clancy Brown, Dan Castellaneta, Lane Toran, E.G. Daily, R. Lee Ermey, Ron Glass, Tony Jay, Clyde Kusatsu, Charles Kimbrough, Tress MacNeille, Andrea Martin, Anndi McAfee, Ryan O'Donohue, Phil Proctor, Patrick Renna, Kevin Michael Richardson, Jack Riley, Justin Shenkarow, Michael Shulman, Francesca Marie Smith, Kath Soucie, Robert Stack, Ken Swofford, Nicholas Turturro, Erik von Detten, Paul Willson, Jack Johnson, Ben Diskin, Erica Mer, Murphy Dunne, Aaron Spann, Doug Stone, W.K. Stratton, Shane Sweet, Klee Bragger, Rachel Crane, Mark Robert Myers, Wendy Hoffman, Ashley Michael Bell, Richard Jannone, John Bruno, Steve Buellin, Danielle Judovits, Erin Donavan, Ashley Edner, Jessica Gee, Jackie Gonneau, Glen-Bob Sweet, Sarah Rayne, Charity James	
F E B R U A R Y	16	Revolution OS	Seventh Art Releasing	J. T. S. Moore (director/screenplay); Richard Stallman, Linus Torvalds, Eric S. Raymond, Bruce Perens	
F E B R U A R Y	16	Road to Redemption	World Wide Pictures	Robert Vernon (director/screenplay); Pat Hingle, Julie Condra, Leo Rossi, Jay Underwood, Tony Longo, Wes Studi	
F E B R U A R Y	16	Sweet November	Warner Bros. Pictures / Bel-Air Entertainment	Pat O'Connor (director); Paul Yurick, Kurt Voelker (screenplay); Keanu Reeves, Charlize Theron, Jason Isaacs, Greg Germann, Liam Aiken, Lauren Graham, Frank Langella, Ray Baker, Michael Rosenbaum, Robert Joy, Jason Kravits, Tom Bullock, Susan Zelinsky	
F E B R U A R Y	23	3000 Miles to Graceland	Warner Bros. Pictures / Morgan Creek Productions / Franchise Pictures	Demian Lichtenstein (director/screenplay); Richard Recco (screenplay); Kurt Russell, Kevin Costner, Courteney Cox Arquette, Christian Slater, Kevin Pollak, David Arquette, Jon Lovitz, Howie Long, Thomas Haden Church, Bokeem Woodbine, Ice-T, David Kaye, Louis Lombardi, Shawn Michael Howard, Michael Kopsa, Daisy McCrackin, Paul Anka, Tim Misny, Kim Hawthorne, Gianni Russo, Morgan H. Margolis, Luis Moro, Christine Chatelain, Campbell Lane, Terry Chen, Mark Acheson, Peter Bryant, Dave Babych, Mark Gibbon, Frank C. Turner, Max Goldblatt, Brian Drummond, Kelly Carlson	
F E B R U A R Y	23	Monkeybone	20th Century Fox	Henry Selick (director); Sam Hamm (screenplay); Brendan Fraser, Bridget Fonda, Chris Kattan, Whoopi Goldberg, Rose McGowan, Giancarlo Esposito, John Turturro, Dave Foley, Megan Mullally, Lisa Zane, Thomas Haden Church, Shawnee Free Jones, Ilia Volok, Claudette Mink, Bob Odenkirk, Doug Jones, Brian Steele, Leif Tilden, Roger L. Jackson, Joe Ranft, Bruce Lanoil, Allan Trautman, Sandra Thigpen, Thomas Molloy, Jon Bruno, Owen Masterson, Jen Sung Outerbridge, Michael Anthony Jackson, Jody St. Michael, Arturo Gil, Frit Fuller, Frat Fuller, Tom Fisher, Joseph S. Griffo, Kim Timbers-Patteri, Lisa Ebeyer, Wayne Doba, Mark Vinello, Nathan Stein, Ed Holmes, Ted Rooney, Debi Durst, Phil Brotherton, Jym Dingler, Leslie Hedger, Toby Gleason, Mike Mitchell	
F E B R U A R Y	24	Boycott	HBO Films	Clark Johnson (director); Stewart Burns, Herman Daniel Farrell (screenplay); Jeffrey Wright, Carmen Ejogo, Terrence Howard, CCH Pounder, Reg E. Cathey, Brent Jennings, Shawn Michael Howard, Erik Dellums, Mike Hodge, Whitman Mayo, E. Roger Mitchell, Clark Johnson, Jack Martin, Thomas Jefferson Byrd, James Bigwood, Dan Biggers, Elisabeth Omilami, Omar J. Dorsey, Aaron Neville, Cassi Davis, Bill Irwin, Iris Little Thomas, Walter Franks, Mert Hatfield, Tom Nowicki, Danny Nelson, Heather Salmon, Crystal Garrett	
M A R C H	2	The Caveman's Valentine	Universal Focus	Kasi Lemmons (director); George Dawes Green (screenplay); Samuel L. Jackson, Colm Feore, Aunjanue Ellis, Tamara Tunie, Jay Rodan, Ann Magnuson, Anthony Michael Hall, Sean MacMahon, Jeff Geddis	
M A R C H	2	The Mexican	DreamWorks	Gore Verbinski (director); J. H. Wyman (screenplay); Brad Pitt, Julia Roberts, James Gandolfini, J. K. Simmons, Bob Balaban, Sherman Augustus, Michael Cerveris, David Krumholtz, Castulo Guerra, Gene Hackman	
M A R C H	2	See Spot Run	Warner Bros. Pictures / Village Roadshow Pictures	John Whitesell (director); George Gallo, Gregory Poirer, Dan Baron, Chris Faber (screenplay); David Arquette, Michael Clarke Duncan, Leslie Bibb, Joe Viterelli, Angus T. Jones, Steven R. Schirripa, Anthony Anderson, Paul Sorvino, Kim Hawthorne, Kavan Smith, Fulvio Cecere, Sarah-Jane Redmond, Bill Dow, Kandyse McClure, Constance Marie, Roger Haskett, Stephen E. Miller, Darcy Laurie, Michael Sunczyk, Dan O'Connell	
M A R C H	9	15 Minutes	New Line Cinema	John Herzfeld (director/screenplay); Robert De Niro, Edward Burns, Kelsey Grammer, Avery Brooks, Karel Roden, Oleg Taktarov, Melina Kanakaredes, Vera Farmiga, John DiResta, James Handy, Darius McCrary, Bruce Cutler, Charlize Theron, Kim Cattrall, David Alan Grier, Vladimir Mashkov, Irina Gasanova, Noelle Evans, Tygh Runyan, Ritchie Coster, Gabriel Casseus, Anton Yelchin	
M A R C H	9	Get Over It	Miramax Films	Tommy O'Haver (director); R. Lee Fleming Jr. (screenplay); Kirsten Dunst, Ben Foster, Melissa Sagemiller, Sisqó, Shane West, Colin Hanks, Swoosie Kurtz, Ed Begley Jr., Zoe Saldaña, Mila Kunis, Carmen Electra, Martin Short, Vitamin C, Coolio, Christopher Jacot, Kylie Bax, Dov Tiefenbach, Megan Fahlenbock, Shawn Roberts, Tommy O'Haver, Michael Boisvert, Rukiya Bernard	
M A R C H	11	Things You Can Tell Just by Looking at Her	Metro-Goldwyn-Mayer	Rodrigo García (director/screenplay); Glenn Close, Cameron Diaz, Calista Flockhart, Amy Brenneman, Holly Hunter, Kathy Baker, Valeria Golino, Matt Craven, Gregory Hines, Miguel Sandoval, Noah Fleiss, Danny Woodburn, Penelope Allen, Roma Maffia, Mika Boorem, Irma St. Paule, Juanita Jennings, Erik King, Elpidia Carrillo	
M A R C H	16	Enemy at the Gates	Paramount Pictures / Mandalay Pictures	Jean-Jacques Annaud (director/screenplay); Alain Godard (screenplay); Jude Law, Joseph Fiennes, Rachel Weisz, Bob Hoskins, Ed Harris, Ron Perlman, Eva Mattes, Gabriel Thomson, Matthias Habich, Sophie Rois, Ivan Shvedoff, Clemens Schick, Lenn Kudrjawizki, Gennadi Vengerov, Dan van Husen, Markus Majowski, Robert Stadlober, Holger Handtke, Mark Zak, Tom Wlaschiha, Werner Daehn, Birol Ünel, Axel Neumann, Eddy Joseph, Martin Glyn Murray, Valentin Platareanu, Mario Bandi, Hans-Martin Stier	
M A R C H	16	Exit Wounds	Warner Bros. Pictures / Village Roadshow Pictures / Silver Pictures	Andrzej Bartkowiak (director); Ed Horowitz, Richard D'Ovidio (screenplay); Steven Seagal, DMX, Isaiah Washington, Jill Hennessy, Anthony Anderson, Michael Jai White, David Vadim, Shane Daly, Bill Duke, Tom Arnold, Bruce McGill, Eva Mendes, Drag-On, Jennifer Irwin, Matthew G. Taylor, Paolo Mastropieto	
M A R C H	16	Memento	Newmarket Films / Summit Entertainment	Christopher Nolan (director/screenplay); Guy Pearce, Carrie-Anne Moss, Joe Pantoliano, Mark Boone Junior, Stephen Tobolowsky, Harriet Sansom Harris, Callum Keith Rennie, Larry Holden, Jorja Fox, Thomas Lennon, Marianne Muellerleile	
M A R C H	23	The Brothers	Screen Gems	Gary Hardwick (director/screenplay); Morris Chestnut, D. L. Hughley, Bill Bellamy, Shemar Moore, Gabrielle Union, Tatyana Ali, Jenifer Lewis, Tamala Jones, Clifton Powell, Susan Dalian, Marla Gibbs, Julie Benz, Vanessa Bell Calloway, Angelle Brooks, Kimberly Scott, Aloma Wright, Kim Porter, Tanya Wright, Gary Hardwick, Nadege Auguste, Nayo Wallace, Henry Kingi Jr., Darin Scott	
M A R C H	23	Heartbreakers	Metro-Goldwyn-Mayer	David Mirkin (director); Robert Dunn, Paul Guay, Stephen Mazur (screenplay); Sigourney Weaver, Jennifer Love Hewitt, Ray Liotta, Jason Lee, Gene Hackman, Anne Bancroft, Jeffrey Jones, Nora Dunn, Julio Oscar Mechoso, Ricky Jay, Sarah Silverman, Zach Galifianakis, Michael Hitchcock, Carrie Fisher, Elya Baskin, Shawn Colvin, Alan Blumenfeld, Kevin Nealon, Peter Spellos, Oleg Stefan, Patricia Belcher, David Mirkin, Catherine Butterfield, T.J. Thyne, Stacey Travis	
M A R C H	23	Say It Isn't So	20th Century Fox	J. B. Rogers (director); Peter Gaulke, Gerry Swallow (screenplay); Chris Klein, Heather Graham, Orlando Jones, Sally Field, Richard Jenkins, John Rothman, Jack Plotnick, Eddie Cibrian, Mark Pellegrino, Brent Hinkley, Henry Cho, Richard Riehle, Brent Briscoe, Ezra Buzzington, Julie White, David L. Lander, Lin Shaye, C. Ernst Harth, Connor Widdows, Courtney Peldon, Matthew Peters, Sarah Silverman, Greg Kean, Alejandro Abellan, Dan Murphy, Austin Stark, Suzanne Somers	
M A R C H	24	Wit	HBO Films	Mike Nichols (director/screenplay); Emma Thompson (screenplay); Emma Thompson, Christopher Lloyd, Eileen Atkins, Audra McDonald, Jonathan M. Woodward, Harold Pinter, Hari Dhillon, Benedict Wong, Lachele Carl, David Menkin, David Zayas, Jenny Jules, Gary Beadle	
M A R C H	30	Someone Like You	20th Century Fox / Fox 2000 Pictures	Tony Goldwyn (director); Elizabeth Chandler (screenplay); Ashley Judd, Greg Kinnear, Hugh Jackman, Marisa Tomei, Ellen Barkin, Catherine Dent, Peter Friedman, Laura Regan, Donna Hanover, Nicole Leach, Colleen Camp, Julie Kavner, Sabine Singh, Shuler Hensley, Mireille Enos, Veronica Webb, Naomi Judd, Hugh Downs, Tony Goldwyn, Chris Kerson, Krysten Ritter	
M A R C H	30	Spy Kids	Dimension Films / Troublemaker Studios	Robert Rodriguez (director/screenplay); Antonio Banderas, Carla Gugino, Alexa Vega, Daryl Sabara, Alan Cumming, Tony Shalhoub, Teri Hatcher, Cheech Marin, Robert Patrick, Danny Trejo, Mike Judge, Richard Linklater, Guillermo Navarro, Eve Sabara, Dick Clark, Angela Lanza, George Clooney	
M A R C H	30	The Tailor of Panama	Columbia Pictures	John Boorman (director/screenplay); Andrew Davies, John le Carré (screenplay); Pierce Brosnan, Geoffrey Rush, Jamie Lee Curtis, Leonor Varela, Brendan Gleeson, Harold Pinter, Catherine McCormack, Daniel Radcliffe, Martin Ferrero, David Hayman, Mark Margolis, John Fortune, Jon Polito, Dylan Baker, Jonathan Hyde, Martin Savage, Paul Birchard, Ken Jenkins, Doug Cockle, Lisa Dwan, Manuel Noriega, Lola Boorman, Douglas Waters, Harry Ditson	
M A R C H	30	Tomcats	Columbia Pictures / Revolution Studios	Gregory Poirier (director/screenplay); Jerry O'Connell, Shannon Elizabeth, Jake Busey, Horatio Sanz, Jaime Pressly, Bernie Casey, David Ogden Stiers, Travis Fine, Heather Stephens, Julia Schultz, Kam Heskin, J. Kenneth Campbell, David St. James, Buck Kartalian, Amber Smith, Billy Hufsey, Candice Beckman, Dakota Fanning, Joseph D. Reitman, Bill Maher, Garry Marshall, Emilio Rivera, Thomas Rosales Jr., Rachel Sterling, Marisa Petroro	

== April–June ==
Opening		Title	Production company	Cast and crew	Ref.
A P R I L	6	Along Came a Spider	Paramount Pictures	Lee Tamahori (director); Marc Moss (screenplay); Morgan Freeman, Monica Potter, Michael Wincott, Dylan Baker, Mika Boorem, Billy Burke, Anton Yelchin, Jay O. Sanders, Michael Moriarty, Penelope Ann Miller, Anna Maria Horsford, Kim Hawthorne, Christopher Shyer, Jill Teed, Samantha Ferris, Ocean Hellman, Tom McBeath, Ravil Isyanov, Campbell Lane	
A P R I L	6	Blow	New Line Cinema	Ted Demme (director); Nick Cassavetes, David McKenna (screenplay); Johnny Depp, Jordi Mollà, Penélope Cruz, Ray Liotta, Paul Reubens, Franka Potente, Rachel Griffiths, Cliff Curtis, Max Perlich, Miguel Sandoval, Ethan Suplee, Elizabeth Rodriguez, Kevin Gage, Tony Amendola, Bobcat Goldthwait, Michael Tucci, Monet Mazur, Lola Glaudini, Jennifer Gimenez, Emma Roberts, Jaime King, Jesse James, Alan James Morgan	
A P R I L	6	Just Visiting	Hollywood Pictures	Jean-Marie Gaubert (director); Jean-Marie Poiré, Christian Clavier, John Hughes (screenplay); Jean Reno, Christina Applegate, Christian Clavier, Matt Ross, Malcolm McDowell, Tara Reid, Bridgette Wilson-Sampras, John Aylward, George Plimpton, Alexis Loret	
A P R I L	6	Pokémon 3: The Movie	Warner Bros. Pictures / Nintendo / 4Kids Entertainment	Kunihiko Yuyama (director); Hideki Sonoda, Takeshi Shudo (screenplay); Veronica Taylor, Ikue Ōtani, Rachael Lillis, Eric Stuart, Lisa Ortiz, Ted Lewis, Kayzie Rogers, Ryan Drummond, Tara Jayne, Roger Kay, Ken Gates, Amy Birnbaum, Lee Quick, Kathy Pilon, Peter R. Bird, Stuart Zagnit, Dan Green	
A P R I L	11	Joe Dirt	Columbia Pictures	Dennie Gordon (director); David Spade, Fred Wolf (screenplay); David Spade, Brittany Daniel, Dennis Miller, Adam Beach, Christopher Walken, Jaime Pressly, Kid Rock, Fred Ward, Rosanna Arquette, Joe Don Baker, Megan Harvey, Caroline Aaron, Brian Thompson, Blake Clark, Hamilton Camp, Mitzi Martin, Tyler Mane, Kevin Farley, John P. Farley, Rance Howard, Steven Brill, Richard Riehle, Bree Turner, Erik Per Sullivan, Hal Fishman, Eddie Money, Carson Daly, Kevin Nealon	
A P R I L	11	Josie and the Pussycats	Universal Pictures / Metro-Goldwyn-Mayer	Harry Elfont, Deborah Kaplan (director/screenplay); Rachael Leigh Cook, Tara Reid, Rosario Dawson, Alan Cumming, Parker Posey, Gabriel Mann, Paulo Costanzo, Missi Pyle, Eugene Levy, Justin Chatwin, Breckin Meyer, Katharine Isabelle, Tom Butler, Donald Faison, Seth Green, Alexander Martin, Serena Altschul, Carson Daly, Aries Spears, Kenneth "Babyface" Edmonds, Russ Leatherman, Harry Elfont, Zak Santiago, Hiro Kanagawa, Kurt Max Runte, Balinder Johal, Enuka Okuma, Erin Fitzgerald, Mark Seliger, JR Bourne, Kris Pope, Paul Becker, Jen Soska, Sylvia Soska	
A P R I L	11	Kingdom Come	Fox Searchlight Pictures	Doug McHenry (director); David Dean Bottrell, Jessie Jones (screenplay); LL Cool J, Jada Pinkett Smith, Vivica A. Fox, Loretta Devine, Anthony Anderson, Toni Braxton, Cedric the Entertainer, Darius McCrary, Whoopi Goldberg, Richard Gant, Kellita Smith, Clifton Davis, Masasa Moyo, Dominic Hoffman, Ellis E. Williams	
A P R I L	13	Bridget Jones's Diary	Miramax Films / StudioCanal / Universal Pictures / Working Title Films	Sharon Maguire (director); Andrew Davies, Richard Curtis (screenplay); Renée Zellweger, Hugh Grant, Colin Firth, Jim Broadbent, Embeth Davidtz, Gemma Jones, Celia Imrie, James Faulkner, Shirley Henderson, James Callis, Sally Phillips, Lisa Barbuscia, Donald Douglas, Charmian May, Paul Brooke, Patrick Barlow, Felicity Montagu, Neil Pearson, Dolly Wells, Salman Rushdie, Julian Barnes, Jeffrey Archer, Honor Blackman, Christopher Kouros	
A P R I L	20	The Center of the World	Artisan Entertainment	Wayne Wang (director/screenplay); Miranda July, Paul Auster, Siri Hustvedt (screenplay); Peter Sarsgaard, Molly Parker, Mel Gorham, Alisha Klass, Jason Calacanis, Carla Gugino, Pat Morita, Balthazar Getty, Robert Lefkowitz	
A P R I L	20	Crocodile Dundee in Los Angeles	Paramount Pictures	Simon Wincer (director); Matthew Berry, Eric Abrams (screenplay); Paul Hogan, Linda Kozlowski, Jere Burns, Jonathan Banks, Alec Wilson, Gerry Skilton, Steve Rackman, Serge Cockburn, Aida Turturro, Paul Rodriguez, Kaitlin Hopkins, David Ngoombujarra, Patrick Dargan, Matt Winston, Morgan O'Neill, Clare Carey, Keli Daniels, Grant Piro, Shanyn Asmar, John Billingsley, Jay Acovone, Rick Gonzalez, Kenneth Ransom, Nicholas Hammond, Mike Tyson, George Hamilton	
A P R I L	20	Freddy Got Fingered	20th Century Fox / Regency Enterprises	Tom Green (director/screenplay); Derek Harvie (screenplay); Tom Green, Rip Torn, Marisa Coughlan, Eddie Kaye Thomas, Harland Williams, Anthony Michael Hall, Julie Hagerty, Drew Barrymore, Shaquille O'Neal, Jackson Davies, Connor Widdows, Lorena Gale, Noel Fisher, Stephen Tobolowsky	
A P R I L	27	Driven	Warner Bros. Pictures / Franchise Pictures	Renny Harlin (director); Sylvester Stallone (screenplay); Sylvester Stallone, Burt Reynolds, Kip Pardue, Til Schweiger, Gina Gershon, Estella Warren, Cristián de la Fuente, Stacy Edwards, Robert Sean Leonard, Jean Alesi, Jacques Villeneuve, Juan Pablo Montoya, Adrián Fernández, Mark Blundell, Roberto Moreno, Kenny Brack, Tony Kanaan, Mauricio Gugelmin, Max Papis	
A P R I L	27	The Forsaken	Screen Gems	J. S. Cardone (director/screenplay); Kerr Smith, Brendan Fehr, Izabella Miko, Johnathon Schaech, Phina Oruche, Simon Rex, Carrie Snodgress, Alexis Thorpe, F.J. Flynn, Sara Downing	
A P R I L	27	One Night at McCool's	USA Films	Harald Zwart (director); Stan Seidel (screenplay); Liv Tyler, Matt Dillon, John Goodman, Paul Reiser, Michael Douglas, Andrew Silverstein, Reba McEntire, Richard Jenkins, Leo Rossi, Andrea Bendewald, Sandy Martin	
A P R I L	27	Town & Country	New Line Cinema	Peter Chelsom (director); Michael Laughlin, Buck Henry (screenplay); Warren Beatty, Diane Keaton, Goldie Hawn, Garry Shandling, Andie MacDowell, Jenna Elfman, Nastassja Kinski, Charlton Heston, Marian Seldes, Josh Hartnett, Katharine Towne, Ian McNeice, William Hootkins, Terri Hoyos, Tricia Vessey, Azura Skye, Buck Henry, Charlie Rose	
A P R I L	28	61*	HBO Films	Billy Crystal (director); Hank Steinberg (screenplay); Thomas Jane, Barry Pepper, Anthony Michael Hall, Richard Masur, Bruce McGill, Chris Bauer, Jennifer Crystal Foley, Patricia Crowley, Christopher McDonald, Bob Gunton, Donald Moffat, Renée Taylor, Peter Jacobson, Seymour Cassel, Robert Joy, Bobby Hosea, Michael Nouri, Tom Candiotti, Joe Grifasi, Domenick Lombardozzi, Joe Buck, Chip Esten, Bob Sheppard, Shiva Rose, Scott Waara, Jerry Coleman, Connor Trinneer, J.D. Cullum, Sean Marquette, Maile Flanagan, Robert Costanzo, Kiff VandenHeuvel, James Intveld, Brendan McCarthy, Billy Crystal, Christopher Marquette, Mark McGwire, Sammy Sosa, Paul Borghese, E.E. Bell, Conor O'Farrell	
M A Y	4	Mockingbird Don't Sing	Mainline Releasing	Harry Bromley Davenport (director); Daryl Haney (screenplay); Tarra Steele, Melissa Errico, Sean Young, Kim Darby	
M A Y	4	The Mummy Returns	Universal Pictures / Alphaville Films	Stephen Sommers (director/screenplay); Brendan Fraser, Rachel Weisz, John Hannah, Freddie Boath, Oded Fehr, Arnold Vosloo, Patricia Velásquez, Alun Armstrong, Adewale Akinnuoye-Agbaje, Shaun Parkes, Dwayne "The Rock" Johnson, Bruce Byron, Joe Dixon, Tom Parker, Aharon Ipale	
M A Y	11	A Knight's Tale	Columbia Pictures	Brian Helgeland (director/screenplay); Heath Ledger, Mark Addy, Rufus Sewell, Paul Bettany, Shannyn Sossamon, Alan Tudyk, Laura Fraser, Berenice Bejo, James Purefoy, Leagh Conwell, Christopher Cazenove, Steven O'Donnell, Nick Brimble, Roger Ashton-Griffiths, David Schneider, Alice Connor, Berwick Kaler, Jonathan Slinger	
M A Y	18	About Adam	Miramax Films	Gerard Stembridge (director); Gerard Stembridge (screenplay); Kate Hudson, Stuart Townsend, Frances O'Connor, Rosaleen Linehan, Charlotte Bradley, Alan Maher, Brendan Dempsey	
M A Y	18	Angel Eyes	Warner Bros. Pictures / Morgan Creek Productions / Franchise Pictures / The Canton Company	Luis Mandoki (director); Gerald Di Pego (screenplay); Jennifer Lopez, Jim Caviezel, Jeremy Sisto, Terrence Howard, Sônia Braga, Victor Argo, Monet Mazur, Shirley Knight, Daniel Magder, Guylaine St-Onge, Jeremy Ratchford, Peter MacNeill, Dan Petronijevic, Kari Matchett, Marcello Thedford, Stephen Kay, Chuck Campbell, Connor McAuley, Eldridge Hyndman, Michael Cameron, Dave Cox	
M A Y	18	Shrek	DreamWorks / PDI/DreamWorks	Andrew Adamson, Vicky Jenson (director); Ted Elliott, Terry Rossio, Joe Stillman, Roger S. H. Schulman (screenplay); Mike Myers, Eddie Murphy, Cameron Diaz, John Lithgow, Vincent Cassel, Peter Dennis, Jim Cummings, Chris Miller, Cody Cameron, Kathleen Freeman, Christopher Knights, Simon J. Smith, Conrad Vernon, Aron Warner, Andrew Adamson, Val Bettin, Ian Abercrombie, Bridget Hoffman, Richard Horvitz, Sherry Hursey, Rif Hutton, Steve Bulen, Tony Pope, Peter Renaday, Moosie Drier, Iake Eissinmann, Lia Sargent, Elisa Gabrielli, Jean Gilpin, Frank Welker, Charles Dennis, Mehmet Ali Erbil, Phillip Ingram, Jack Angel, Bob Bergen, Rodger Bumpass, Aria Noelle Curzon, Paul Eiding, Bill Farmer, Phil Proctor, Claudette Wells	
M A Y	19	Conspiracy	HBO Films / BBC	Loring Mandel (director); Frank Pierson (screenplay); Kenneth Branagh, Stanley Tucci, Colin Firth, Ian McNeice, Kevin McNally, David Threlfall, Ewan Stewart, Brian Pettifer, Nicholas Woodeson, Jonathan Coy, Brendan Coyle, Ben Daniels, Barnaby Kay, Owen Teale, Peter Sullivan, Tom Hiddleston, Ross O'Hennessy, David Glover, David Spinx, Dirk Martens, Florian Panzner, Hinnerk Schönemann, Rod Culbertson	
M A Y	25	Pearl Harbor	Touchstone Pictures / Jerry Bruckheimer Films	Michael Bay (director); Randall Wallace (screenplay); Ben Affleck, Josh Hartnett, Kate Beckinsale, Cuba Gooding Jr., Tom Sizemore, Jon Voight, Colm Feore, Mako, Alec Baldwin, Jennifer Garner, Ewen Bremner, William Fichtner, Andrew Bryniarski, Jaime King, Catherine Kellner, William Lee Scott, Greg Zola, Michael Shannon, Matthew Davis, Dan Aykroyd, Kim Coates, Sara Rue, Tony Curran, Nicholas Farrell, Steve Rankin, John Fujioka, Leland Orser, Ted McGinley, Brandon Lozano, Eric Christian Olsen, Sean Faris, Cary-Hiroyuki Tagawa, Scott Wilson, Graham Beckel, Tom Everett, Tomas Arana, Peter Firth, Glenn Morshower, Yuji Okumoto, Madison Mason, Michael Shamus Wiles, Seth Sakai, Jesse James, Reiley McClendon, Brian Haley, David Hornsby, Randy Oglesby, Ping Wu, Beth Grant, Sung Kang, Raphael Sbarge, Marty Belafsky, Michael Milhoan, Nicholas Downs, Tim Choate, John Diehl, Ron Harper, Scott Wiper, John Pyper-Ferguson, Sean Gunn, David Kaufman, Lindsey Ginter, Pat Healy, Thomas Wilson Brown, Chad Morgan, James Saito, Frederick Koehler	
M A Y	25	The Man Who Cried	Universal Focus	Sally Potter (director/screenplay); Christina Ricci, Cate Blanchett, John Turturro, Johnny Depp, Harry Dean Stanton, Oleg Yankovsky, Miriam Karlin, Don Fellows, Hana Maria Pravda, Sue Cleaver, Paul Clayton, Diana Hoddinott, Alan David, Imogen Claire, Richard Sammel, Cyril Shaps, Mark Ivanir, Salvatore Licitra, Iva Bittova, Kellie Shirley, Claudia Lander-Duke	
J U N E	1	The Animal	Columbia Pictures / Revolution Studios	Luke Greenfield (director); Rob Schneider, Tom Brady (screenplay); Rob Schneider, Colleen Haskell, John C. McGinley, Guy Torry, Edward Asner, Michael Caton, Louis Lombardi, Norm Macdonald, John P. Farley, Adam Sandler, Sebastian Jude, Charlie Stewart, Philip Daniel Bolden, Ron Rogge, Wes Takahashi	
J U N E	1	Moulin Rouge!	20th Century Fox	Baz Luhrmann (director/screenplay); Craig Pearce (screenplay); Nicole Kidman, Ewan McGregor, Jim Broadbent, Richard Roxburgh, John Leguizamo, Jacek Koman, Caroline O'Connor, Kerry Walker, Garry McDonald, David Wenham, Kiruna Stamell, DeObia Oparei, Kylie Minogue, Peter Whitford, Linal Haft, Carole Skinner, Jonathan Hardy, Ozzy Osbourne, Plácido Domingo, Lara Mulcahy, Matt Whittet, Keith Robinson	
J U N E	1	What's the Worst That Could Happen?	Metro-Goldwyn-Mayer	Sam Weisman (director); Matthew Chapman (screenplay); Martin Lawrence, Danny DeVito, John Leguizamo, Glenne Headly, Carmen Ejogo, Bernie Mac, Larry Miller, Nora Dunn, Richard Schiff, William Fichtner, Ana Gasteyer, GQ, Siobhan Fallon Hogan, Lenny Clarke, Cam Neely, Christy Scott Cashman, Tracey Gold, Dana Wheeler-Nicholson	
J U N E	8	The Anniversary Party	Fine Line Features	Jennifer Jason Leigh, Alan Cumming (directors/screenplay); Jennifer Jason Leigh, Alan Cumming, Kevin Kline, John C. Reilly, Jane Adams, Parker Posey, Phoebe Cates, Gwyneth Paltrow, Denis O'Hare, Mina Badie, John Benjamin Hickey, Michael Panes, Jennifer Beals, Matt Malloy, Mary Lynn Rajskub, Blair Tefkin, Karen Kilgariff, Craig Chester, JR Reed, Sadie Frost, Matt McGrath	
J U N E	8	Bride of the Wind	Paramount Classics	Bruce Beresford (director); Marilyn Levy (screenplay); Sarah Wynter, Jonathan Pryce, Vincent Perez, Simon Verhoeven, Gregor Seberg, August Schmölzer, Johannes Silberschneider, Renée Fleming, Dagmar Schwarz, Wolfgang Hübsch, Hans Steunzer, Robert Herzl	
J U N E	8	Evolution	DreamWorks / Columbia Pictures / The Montecito Picture Company	Ivan Reitman (director); David Diamond, David Weissman, Don Jakoby (screenplay); David Duchovny, Orlando Jones, Seann William Scott, Julianne Moore, Ted Levine, Ethan Suplee, Michael Ray Bower, Pat Kilbane, Ty Burrell, Dan Aykroyd, Katharine Towne, Gregory Itzin, Michelle Wolff, Sarah Silverman, Richard Moll, Michael McGrady, Steven Gilborn, Michael Chapman, Kyle Gass, Jennifer Savidge, Jerry Trainor, Stephanie Hodge, Kristen Meadows, Winifred Freedman, Miriam Flynn, Mary Pat Gleason, Lee Garlington, Kenny Blank, John Cho, Chris Wylde, Marty Belafsky, Tom Davis, Tom Woodruff Jr., Ashley Clark, Caroline Reitman	
J U N E	8	Swordfish	Warner Bros. Pictures / Village Roadshow Pictures / Silver Pictures	Dominic Sena (director); Skip Woods (screenplay); John Travolta, Hugh Jackman, Halle Berry, Don Cheadle, Vinnie Jones, Sam Shepard, Drea de Matteo, Rudolf Martin, Zach Grenier, Camryn Grimes, Kirk B.R. Woller, Carmen Argenziano, Tim DeKay, Craig Braun, William Mapother, Ilia Volok, Margaret Travolta, Dana Hee, Mark Soper, Nick Loren, Timothy Omundson, Tate Donovan, George Marshall Ruge, Angelo Pagan, Laura Lane	
J U N E	12	Stanley Kubrick: A Life in Pictures	Warner Bros. Pictures	Jan Harlan (director); Stanley Kubrick, Steven Marcus, Alexander Singer, Paul Mazursky, Irene Kane, James B. Harris, Marie Windsor, Richard Schickel, Christiane Kubrick, Peter Ustinov, Anthony Frewin, Alex Cox, Woody Allen, John Calley, Ken Adam, Sydney Pollack, Arthur C. Clarke, Brian Aldiss, Doug Trumbull, Keir Dullea, Tony Palmer, György Ligeti, Jack Nicholson, Malcolm McDowell, Alan Parker, Leon Vitali, Terry Semel, Allen Daviau, Milena Canonero, Steven Berkoff, Shelley Duvall, Wendy Carlos, Katharina Kubrick, Michael Herr, Matthew Modine, Doug Milsome, Alan Yentob, Nicole Kidman, Tom Cruise, Martin Scorsese, Steven Spielberg, Jan Harlan, Vivian Kubrick, Barbara Kroner, Paul Lashmar, Anya Kubrick, Ed Di Giulio, Mike Herrtage, Margaret Adams, Philip Hobbs	
J U N E	15	Atlantis: The Lost Empire	Walt Disney Pictures	Gary Trousdale, Kirk Wise (directors); Tab Murphy (screenplay); Michael J. Fox, Cree Summer Francks, James Garner, Corey Burton, Don Novello, Phil Morris, John Mahoney, Claudia Christian, Jacqueline Obradors, Florence Stanley, David Ogden Stiers, Jim Varney, Leonard Nimoy, Jim Cummings, Patrick Pinney, Steve Barr, Rodger Bumpass, Jack Angel, Jennifer Darling, Sherry Lynn, Bob Bergen, Paul Eiding, Phil Proctor, Luck Hari, Mickie McGowan, Bill Striglos	
J U N E	15	Lara Croft: Tomb Raider	Paramount Pictures / Mutual Film Company	Simon West (director); Patrick Massett, John Zinman (screenplay); Angelina Jolie, Jon Voight, Chris Barrie, Iain Glen, Noah Taylor, Daniel Craig, Richard Johnson, Julian Rhind-Tutt, Leslie Phillips, Henry Wyndham	
J U N E	22	Dr. Dolittle 2	20th Century Fox / Davis Entertainment	Steve Carr (director); Hugh Lofting, Larry Levin (screenplay); Eddie Murphy, Raven-Symoné, Jeffrey Jones, Kevin Pollak, Kristen Wilson, Kyla Pratt, Lil Zane, James Avery, Andy Richter, Mark Griffin, Ken Hudson Campbell, Victor Raider-Wexler, Lawrence Pressman, Steve Irwin, Anne Stedman, Steve Zahn, Norm Macdonald, Lisa Kudrow, Mike Epps, Jacob Vargas, Michael Rapaport, Phil Proctor, Isaac Hayes, Andy Dick, John Witherspoon, Cedric the Entertainer, Jamie Kennedy, David Cross, Bob Odenkirk, David DeLuise, Hal Sparks, Reni Santoni, Georgia Engel, Joey Lauren Adams, Mandy Moore, Frankie Muniz, Michael McKean, David L. Lander, Tom Kenny, Denise Dowse, Renée Taylor, Richard C. Sarafian, Keone Young, Clyde Kusatsu, John DiMaggio	
J U N E	22	The Fast and the Furious	Universal Pictures	Rob Cohen (director); Gary Scott Thompson, Erik Bergquist, David Ayer (screenplay); Paul Walker, Vin Diesel, Michelle Rodriguez, Jordana Brewster, Rick Yune, Chad Lindberg, Johnny Strong, Matt Schulze, Ted Levine, Ja Rule, Vyto Ruginis, Thom Barry, Noel Gugliemi, R.J. de Vera, Reggie Lee, Peter "Navy" Tuiasosopo, Neal H. Moritz, Rob Cohen	
J U N E	22	The Trumpet of the Swan	TriStar Pictures	Richard Rich, Terry L. Noss (directors); Judy Rothman (screenplay); Dee Bradley Baker, Jason Alexander, Mary Steenburgen, Reese Witherspoon, Seth Green, Carol Burnett, Joe Mantegna, Sam Gifaldi, Melissa Disney, Kath Soucie, E. G. Daily, Pamela Adlon, Steve Vinovich, Gary Anthony Williams, Corey Burton, Michael Winslow, David Jeremiah, Julie Nathanson, Dana Daurey, Michael Kostroff, Lee Magnuson, Steve Franken, Norman Parker, Jack Angel	
J U N E	27	Baby Boy	Columbia Pictures	John Singleton (director/screenplay); Tyrese Gibson, Taraji P. Henson, Omar Gooding, Tamara LaSeon Bass, Candy Ann Brown, A.J. Johnson, Ving Rhames, Snoop Dogg, Angell Conwell, Kareem Grimes, Tracey Cherelle Jones, Mo'Nique, Juanita Jennings, Mario William Jackson, Keith Diamond, Frederick Ricks, Selma McPherson, Tawny Dahl, Serese Teate, Olan Thompson, Deon Gregory, Kym Whitley, Cleopatra Singleton, Jamaica Carter, John Singleton	
J U N E	29	A.I. Artificial Intelligence	Warner Bros. Pictures / DreamWorks / Amblin Entertainment	Steven Spielberg (director/screenplay); Haley Joel Osment, Jude Law, Frances O'Connor, Brendan Gleeson, William Hurt, Ben Kingsley, Robin Williams, Meryl Streep, Chris Rock, April Grace, Clark Gregg, Kathryn Morris, Sam Robards, Enrico Colantoni, Jake Thomas, Ashley Scott, Ken Leung, Kevin Sussman, Tom Gallop, Matt Winston, Sabrina Grdevich, Theo Greenly, John Prosky, Paula Malcomson, Michael Berresse, Haley King, Justina Machado, Rena Owen, Adam Alexi-Malle, Laurence Mason, Brent Sexton, Michael Shamus Wiles, Clara Bellar, Wayne Wilderson, Jack Angel, Erik Bauersfeld, Miguel Perez, Matt Malloy, Adrian Grenier, Michael Fishman, Ministry	
J U N E	29	Crazy/Beautiful	Touchstone Pictures	John Stockwell (director); Phil Hay, Matt Manfredi (screenplay); Kirsten Dunst, Jay Hernandez, Bruce Davison, Lucinda Jenney, Taryn Manning, Soledad St. Hilaire, Rolando Molina, Herman Osorio, Miguel Castro, Tommy De La Cruz, Richard Steinmetz, Ana Argueta, Cory Hardrict	
J U N E	29	Pootie Tang	Paramount Pictures	Louis C.K. (director/screenplay); Lance Crouther, Jennifer Coolidge, Wanda Sykes, Robert Vaughn, Chris Rock, J.B. Smoove, Reg E. Cathey, J.D. Williams, Mario Joyner, Dave Attell, Laura Kightlinger, Rick Shapiro, Missy Elliott, David Cross, Cole Hawkins, Andy Richter, Kristen Bell, Keesha Sharp, Todd Barry, Bob Costas, Fabian Celebre, Anthony Iozzo	

== July–September ==
Opening		Title	Production company	Cast and crew	Ref.
J U L Y	4	Cats & Dogs	Warner Bros. Pictures / Village Roadshow Pictures	Lawrence Guterman (director); John Requa, Glenn Ficarra (screenplay); Jeff Goldblum, Elizabeth Perkins, Alexander Pollock, Miriam Margolyes, Tobey Maguire, Alec Baldwin, Sean Hayes, Susan Sarandon, Charlton Heston, Jon Lovitz, Joe Pantoliano, Michael Clarke Duncan, Billy West, Danny Mann, Glenn Ficarra, Paul Pape, Victor Wilson, Charles Howerton, Richard Horvitz, John Michael Higgins, Kevin Carlson, John Kennedy, Bruce Lanoil, Drew Massey, Michelan Sisti, Allan Trautman	
J U L Y	4	Scary Movie 2	Dimension Films	Keenen Ivory Wayans (director); Shawn Wayans, Marlon Wayans, Alyson Fouse, Greg Grabianski, Dave Polsky, Michael Anthony Snowden, Craig Wayans (screenplay); Anna Faris, Regina Hall, Shawn Wayans, Marlon Wayans, Christopher Masterson, Kathleen Robertson, David Cross, James Woods, Tim Curry, Tori Spelling, Chris Elliott, Andy Richter, Richard Moll, Veronica Cartwright, Natasha Lyonne, Beetlejuice, Matt Friedman, Vitamin C, Suli McCullough	
J U L Y	11	Final Fantasy: The Spirits Within	Columbia Pictures / Square Pictures	Hironobu Sakaguchi, Moto Sakakibara (director); Al Reinert, Jeff Vintar (screenplay); Ming-Na Wen, Alec Baldwin, James Woods, Donald Sutherland, Ving Rhames, Steve Buscemi, Peri Gilpin	
J U L Y	13	Legally Blonde	Metro-Goldwyn-Mayer	Robert Luketic (director); Karen McCullah Lutz, Kirsten Smith (screenplay); Reese Witherspoon, Luke Wilson, Selma Blair, Matthew Davis, Victor Garber, Jennifer Coolidge, Holland Taylor, Ali Larter, Jessica Cauffiel, Alanna Ubach, Oz Perkins, Linda Cardellini, Bruce Thomas, Meredith Scott Lynn, Raquel Welch, Francesca P. Roberts, Wayne Federman, Kimberly McCullough, Greg Serano, Allyce Beasley, Moondoggie, Michael B. Silver, Lisa Kushell, Cici Lau, Ted Rooney, James Read, Tane McClure, Lisa K. Wyatt, Victoria Mahoney, Brody Hutzler, Chaney Kley, Nectar Rose, Sasha Barrese, Mark Heidelberger, John Kapelos, Joanna Krupa, Beverly Polcyn, Scott Ryan, Jimmy Star, John Tartaglia	
J U L Y	13	Made	Artisan Entertainment	Jon Favreau (director/screenplay); Jon Favreau, Vince Vaughn, Peter Falk, P. Diddy, Famke Janssen, Faizon Love, Vincent Pastore, David O'Hara, Makenzie Vega, Leonardo Cimino, Federico Castelluccio, Jamie Harris, Jenteal, Sam Rockwell, Bud Cort, Drea de Matteo, Dustin Diamond, Jennifer Esposito, Grandmaster Flash, Jill Nicolini	
J U L Y	13	The Score	Paramount Pictures / Mandalay Pictures	Frank Oz (director); Scott Marshall Smith, Daniel E. Taylor, Kario Salem (screenplay); Marlon Brando, Robert De Niro, Edward Norton, Angela Bassett	
J U L Y	18	Jurassic Park III	Universal Pictures / Amblin Entertainment	Joe Johnston (director); Peter Buchman, Alexander Payne, Jim Taylor (screenplay); Sam Neill, William H. Macy, Téa Leoni, Alessandro Nivola, Trevor Morgan, Michael Jeter, Laura Dern, John Diehl, Bruce A. Young, Taylor Nichols, Mark Harelik, Julio Oscar Mechoso, Blake Bryan	
J U L Y	20	America's Sweethearts	Columbia Pictures / Revolution Studios	Joe Roth (director); Billy Crystal, Peter Tolan (screenplay); Julia Roberts, Billy Crystal, Catherine Zeta-Jones, John Cusack, Hank Azaria, Stanley Tucci, Christopher Walken, Alan Arkin, Seth Green, Larry King, Steve Pink, Rainn Wilson, Eric Balfour, Marty Belafsky, Keri Lynn Pratt, Maria Canals-Barrera, Byron Allen, Charley Steiner, Shaun Robinson, Sibila Vargas, Lisa Joyner, Sam Rubin, Maree Cheatham, Alex Enberg, Leilani Münter, Amber Barretto, Ann Cusack, Emma Roberts	
J U L Y	20	Ghost World	United Artists	Terry Zwigoff (director/screenplay); Daniel Clowes (screenplay); Thora Birch, Scarlett Johansson, Brad Renfro, Illeana Douglas, Steve Buscemi, Bob Balaban, Stacey Travis, Dave Sheridan, Tom McGowan, Debra Azar, Brian George, Pat Healy	
J U L Y	20	Hedwig and the Angry Inch	New Line Cinema	John Cameron Mitchell (director/screenplay); John Cameron Mitchell, Andrea Martin, Michael Pitt, Miriam Shor, Stephen Trask, Theodore Liscinski, Rob Campbell, Michael Aronov, Alberta Watson, Maurits Niggebrugge, Sook-Yin Lee, Maurice Dean Wint, Rosie O'Donnell, Dar Williams, Karen Hines	
J U L Y	27	Planet of the Apes	20th Century Fox	Tim Burton (director); William Broyles Jr., Lawrence Konner, Mark Rosenthal (screenplay); Mark Wahlberg, Tim Roth, Helena Bonham Carter, Michael Clarke Duncan, Paul Giamatti, Estella Warren, Cary-Hiroyuki Tagawa, Kris Kristofferson, David Warner, Lisa Marie, Erick Avari, Luke Eberl, Evan Dexter Parke, Glenn Shadix, Freda Foh Shen, Chris Ellis, Anne Ramsay, Charlton Heston, Linda Harrison, Michael Jace, Michael Wiseman, Deep Roy, Chad Bannon, Kevin Grevioux, Isaac C. Singleton Jr., Philip Tan, Howard Berger, Rick Baker, Kam Heskin, Candace Kroslak, Joanna Krupa, Elizabeth Lackey, Mark Christopher Lawrence, Melody Perkins, Tate Taylor, Leigh Hennessy, Martin Klebba, Sheb Wooley	
J U L Y	27	Wet Hot American Summer	USA Films	David Wain (director/screenplay); Michael Showalter (screenplay); Janeane Garofalo, David Hyde Pierce, Molly Shannon, Paul Rudd, Christopher Meloni, Michael Showalter, Marguerite Moreau, Ken Marino, Michael Ian Black, Zak Orth, A.D. Miles, Amy Poehler, Bradley Cooper, Marisa Ryan, Kevin Sussman, Elizabeth Banks, Joe Lo Truglio, Judah Friedlander, Gideon Jacobs, H. Jon Benjamin	
A U G U S T	3	Apocalypse Now Redux	Miramax Films / American Zoetrope	Francis Ford Coppola (director/screenplay); John Milius (screenplay); Marlon Brando, Robert Duvall, Martin Sheen, Frederic Forrest, Albert Hall, Sam Bottoms, Laurence Fishburne, Christian Marquand, Aurore Clément, Harrison Ford, Dennis Hopper, G.D. Spradlin, Jerry Ziesmer, Scott Glenn, Roman Coppola, Gian-Carlo Coppola, Colleen Camp, Cynthia Wood, Linda Bailey, Bill Graham, Francis Ford Coppola, Vittorio Storaro, R. Lee Ermey, Michael Herr, Michel Pitton, Franck Villard, David Olivier, Chrystel Le Pelletier, Robert Julian, Yvon Le Saux	
A U G U S T	3	Original Sin	Metro-Goldwyn-Mayer / Hyde Park Entertainment	Michael Cristofer (director); Cornell Woolrich, Michael Cristofer (screenplay); Antonio Banderas, Angelina Jolie, Thomas Jane, Jack Thompson, Gregory Itzin, Pedro Armendáriz Jr., James Haven, Allison Mackie, Joan Pringle, Cordelia Richards, Mario Ivan Martinez, Harry Porter, Lisa Owen, Daniel Martinez, Roger Cudney, Adrian Makala, Abraham Stavans, Julio Bracho	
A U G U S T	3	The Princess Diaries	Walt Disney Pictures	Garry Marshall (director); Gina Wendkos (screenplay); Julie Andrews, Anne Hathaway, Héctor Elizondo, Heather Matarazzo, Mandy Moore, Caroline Goodall, Robert Schwartzman, Erik von Detten, Sean O'Bryan, Sandra Oh, Patrick Flueger, Larry Miller, John McGivern, René Auberjonois, Willie Brown, Kathleen Marshall, Mindy Burbano, Gerald Hathaway, Patrick Richwood, Joel McCrary	
A U G U S T	3	Rush Hour 2	New Line Cinema / Roger Birnbaum Productions	Brett Ratner (director); Jeff Nathanson (screenplay); Jackie Chan, Chris Tucker, John Lone, Zhang Ziyi, Roselyn Sánchez, Alan King, Harris Yulin, Kenneth Tsang, Lisa LoCicero, Meiling Melancon, Maggie Q, Audrey Quock, Ernie Reyes Jr., Jeremy Piven, Joel McKinnon Miller, Angela Little, Julia Schultz, Saul Rubinek, Gianni Russo, Michael Chow, Don Cheadle, James Lew, Roger Lim	
A U G U S T	8	The Deep End	Fox Searchlight Pictures	Scott McGehee, David Siegel (directors/screenplay); Tilda Swinton, Goran Višnjić, Jonathan Tucker, Peter Donat, Josh Lucas, Raymond J. Barry, Tamara Hope, Jordon Dorrance, Holmes Osborne, Georgann Johnson, Scott McGehee, David Siegel	
A U G U S T	10	All Over the Guy	Lions Gate Films	Julie Davis (director); Dan Bucatinsky (screenplay); Dan Bucatinsky, Richard Ruccolo, Sasha Alexander, Adam Goldberg, Andrea Martin, Joanna Kerns, Christina Ricci, Lisa Kudrow, Doris Roberts	
A U G U S T	10	American Pie 2	Universal Pictures	J. B. Rogers (director); Adam Herz (screenplay); Jason Biggs, Shannon Elizabeth, Alyson Hannigan, Chris Klein, Natasha Lyonne, Thomas Ian Nicholas, Tara Reid, Seann William Scott, Mena Suvari, Eddie Kaye Thomas, Eugene Levy, Jennifer Coolidge, Chris Owen, Molly Cheek, Denise Faye, Lisa Arturo, John Cho, Justin Isfeld, Eli Marienthal, Casey Affleck, George Wyner, Joelle Carter, Larry Drake, Lee Garlington, Bree Turner, Ernie Lively, Kevin Cooney, JoAnna Garcia, Nora Zehetner, Luke Edwards, Adam Brody, Kevin Kilner, Adam Herz, J. B. Rogers	
A U G U S T	10	Osmosis Jones	Warner Bros. Pictures	Tom Sito, Piet Kroon, Robert Farrelly, Peter Farrelly (directors); Marc Hyman (screenplay); Chris Rock, Laurence Fishburne, David Hyde Pierce, Brandy Norwood, William Shatner, Bill Murray, Molly Shannon, Chris Elliott, Elena Franklin, Ron Howard, Joel Silver, Kid Rock, Joe C., Uncle Kracker, Jonathan Adams, Carlos Alazraqui, Eddie Barth, Rodger Bumpass, Paul Christie, Antonio Fargas, Eddie Frierson, Donald Fullilove, Rif Hutton, Richard Horvitz, James Arnold Taylor, Joyce Kurtz, Anne Lockhart, Sherry Lynn, Danny Mann, Mickie McGowan, "Stuttering" John Melendez, Héctor Mercado, Paul Pape, Chris Phillips, Al Rodrigo, Herschel Sparber, Doug Stone, Steve Susskind, Robert Ray Wisdom, Jansen Panettiere, Billy West, Liz Callaway, Dante Basco, Lauren Tom, Harry Shearer, Doug Preis, David Ossman, Ben Stein	
A U G U S T	10	The Others	Dimension Films	Alejandro Amenábar (director/screenplay); Nicole Kidman, Fionnula Flanagan, Christopher Eccleston, Elaine Cassidy, Eric Sykes, Alakina Mann, James Bentley, Keith Allen, Renee Asherson, Michelle Fairley	
A U G U S T	11	Dinner with Friends	HBO Films / Nina Saxon Film Design	Norman Jewison (director); Donald Margulies (screenplay); Dennis Quaid, Andie MacDowell, Greg Kinnear, Toni Collette, Ruth Reichl	
A U G U S T	17	American Outlaws	Warner Bros. Pictures / Morgan Creek Productions	Les Mayfield (director); Roderick Taylor, John Rogers (screenplay); Colin Farrell, Scott Caan, Ali Larter, Nathaniel Arcand, Gabriel Macht, Gregory Smith, Harris Yulin, Will McCormack, Ronny Cox, Terry O'Quinn, Kathy Bates, Timothy Dalton, Ty O'Neal, Joe Stevens, Muse Watson, Ed Geldart	
A U G U S T	17	Captain Corelli's Mandolin	Universal Pictures / StudioCanal / Miramax Films / Working Title Films	John Madden (director); Shawn Slovo (screenplay); Nicolas Cage, Penélope Cruz, John Hurt, Christian Bale, David Morrissey, Irene Papas, Patrick Malahide, Piero Maggio, Gerasimos Skiadaressis, Aspasia Kralli, Michael Yannatos, Dimitris Kaberidis, Pietro Sarubbi, Viki Maragaki, Emilios Chilakis, Panagis Polichronato, George Kotanidis	
A U G U S T	17	Rat Race	Paramount Pictures / Fireworks Pictures / Zucker Productions / Alphaville Films	Jerry Zucker (director); Andy Breckman (screenplay); John Cleese, Breckin Meyer, Amy Smart, Rowan Atkinson, Cuba Gooding Jr., Whoopi Goldberg, Seth Green, Vince Vieluf, Jon Lovitz, Lanai Chapman, Kathy Najimy, Dave Thomas, Wayne Knight, Silas Weir Mitchell, Paul Rodriguez, Dean Cain, Brandy Ledford, Colleen Camp, Ben Hartnell, Deborah Theaker, Charlotte Zucker, Rance Howard, Gloria Allred, Smash Mouth, Kathy Bates, Diamond Dallas Page, Kimberly Page	
A U G U S T	18	Things Behind the Sun	Showtime / Behind The Sun Productions LLC / Echo Lake Productions	Allison Anders (director/screenplay); Kurt Voss (screenplay); Kim Dickens, Gabriel Mann, Eric Stoltz, Alison Folland, Don Cheadle, Rosanna Arquette, Elizabeth Peña, CCH Pounder, Shawn Reaves, Patsy Kensit, Joshua Leonard, Kristen Vigard	
A U G U S T	24	An American Rhapsody	Paramount Classics / Fireworks Pictures	Éva Gárdos (director/screenplay); Nastassja Kinski, Scarlett Johansson, Tony Goldwyn, Mae Whitman, Larisa Oleynik, Agnes Banfalvy, Zoltan Seress, Zsuzsa Czinkoczi, Balazs Galko, Lisa Jane Persky, Colleen Camp, Emmy Rossum, Eva Soreny, Kata Dobo, Jacqueline Steiger	
A U G U S T	24	Bubble Boy	Touchstone Pictures	Blair Hayes (director); Cinco Paul, Ken Daurio (screenplay); Jake Gyllenhaal, Swoosie Kurtz, Marley Shelton, Danny Trejo, John Carroll Lynch, Verne Troyer, Dave Sheridan, Brian George, Patrick Cranshaw, Ever Carradine, Beetlejuice, Fabio Lanzoni, Zach Galifianakis, Arden Myrin, Pablo Schreiber, Matthew McGrory, Stacy Keibler, Stephen Spinella, Geoffrey Arend, Bonnie Morgan, The Sklar Brothers, Ping Wu, Boti Ann Bliss, Cinco Paul, Ken Daurio, Leo Fitzpatrick, Brian Friedman, Arden Myrin, Mandy Moore, Mitch Holleman, Alex Black, Robert Bailey Jr., Steve Van Wormer, Charles Noland, Gary Bullock, Steven Anthony Lawrence, Raja Fenske, Cleo King, Robert LaSardo	
A U G U S T	24	The Curse of the Jade Scorpion	DreamWorks	Woody Allen (director/screenplay); Woody Allen, Dan Aykroyd, Helen Hunt, Charlize Theron, Brian Markinson, Wallace Shawn, David Ogden Stiers, Elizabeth Berkley, Peter Gerety, John Schuck, Kaili Vernoff, Kevin Cahoon, John Tormey, John Doumanian, Vince Giordano, Brian McConnachie, Judy Gold, Herb Lovelle, Tina Sloan, Bob Dorian, Arthur J. Nascarella, Professor Irwin Corey, Michael Mulheren, Peter Linari	
A U G U S T	24	Ghosts of Mars	Screen Gems	John Carpenter (director/screenplay); Larry Sulkis (screenplay); Ice Cube, Natasha Henstridge, Jason Statham, Pam Grier, Clea DuVall, Joanna Cassidy, Richard Cetrone, Liam Waite, Duane Davis, Lobo Sebastian, Rodney A. Grant, Peter Jason, Wanda De Jesus, Robert Carradine	
A U G U S T	24	Happy Accidents	IFC Films / MGM	Brad Anderson (director/screenplay); Marisa Tomei, Vincent D'Onofrio, Nadia Dajani, Richard Portnow, Anthony Michael Hall, Holland Taylor, José Zúñiga, Sean Gullette, Tamara Jenkins, Sam Seder, Tovah Feldshuh, Larry Fessenden, Cara Buono, Neal Huff, Robert Stanton, Mike McGlone, H. Jon Benjamin, Dan Frazer, Rossano Brazzi, Katharine Hepburn, Lianna Pai, Bronson Dudley	
A U G U S T	24	Jay and Silent Bob Strike Back	Dimension Films	Kevin Smith (director/screenplay); Jason Mewes, Kevin Smith, Jason Lee, Ben Affleck, Shannon Elizabeth, Eliza Dushku, Will Ferrell, Ali Larter, Chris Rock, Jennifer Schwalbach Smith, Brian O'Halloran, Jeff Anderson, Matt Damon, Judd Nelson, George Carlin, Carrie Fisher, Seann William Scott, Jon Stewart, Jules Asner, Steve Kmetko, Tracy Morgan, Gus Van Sant, Jamie Kennedy, Wes Craven, Shannen Doherty, Mark Hamill, Marc Blucas, Matthew James, Jane Silvia, Carmen Llywelyn, Diedrich Bader, Jason Biggs, James Van Der Beek, Morris Day, Bryan Johnson, Walter Flanagan, Renee Humphrey, Joey Lauren Adams, Dwight Ewell, Scott William Winters, William B. Davis, Alanis Morissette	
A U G U S T	24	Summer Catch	Warner Bros. Pictures	Mike Tollin (director); Kevin Falls, John Gatins (screenplay); Freddie Prinze Jr., Jessica Biel, Fred Ward, Jason Gedrick, Brittany Murphy, Gabriel Mann, Bruce Davison, Marc Blucas, Matthew Lillard, Brian Dennehy, John C. McGinley, Wilmer Valderrama, Corey Pearson, Christian Kane, Zena Grey, Traci Dinwiddie, Susan Gardner, Beverly D'Angelo, Ken Griffey Jr., Mike Lieberthal, Doug Glanville, Pat Burrell, Kevin Youkilis, Curt Gowdy, Hank Aaron, Carlton Fisk	
A U G U S T	31	Jeepers Creepers	United Artists	Victor Salva (director/screenplay); Gina Philips, Justin Long, Jonathan Breck, Patricia Belcher, Brandon Smith, Eileen Brennan	
A U G U S T	31	O	Lions Gate Films	Tim Blake Nelson (director); Brad Kaaya (screenplay); Mekhi Phifer, Josh Hartnett, Julia Stiles, Andrew Keegan, Rain Phoenix, Elden Henson, Martin Sheen, John Heard	
A U G U S T	31	Tortilla Soup	Samuel Goldwyn Films / Metro-Goldwyn-Mayer / United Artists / Starz/Encore Entertainment	María Ripoll (director); Tom Musca, Ramón Menéndez, Vera Blasi (screenplay); Héctor Elizondo, Jacqueline Obradors, Elizabeth Peña, Tamara Mello, Raquel Welch, Paul Rodriguez, Constance Marie, Marisabel García, Nikolai Kinski, Julio Oscar Mechoso, Jude Herrera, Ken Marino, Joel Joan, Ulysses Cuadra, Eli Russell Linnetz, Karen Dyer	
S E P T E M B E R	7	Megiddo: The Omega Code 2	Gener8Xion Entertainment	Brian Trenchard-Smith (director); Stephan Blinn, Hollis Barton, John Fasano (screenplay); Michael York, Michael Biehn, Diane Venora, R. Lee Ermey, Udo Kier, and Franco Nero	
S E P T E M B E R	7	The Musketeer	Universal Pictures / Miramax Films	Peter Hyams (director); Gene Quintano (screenplay); Catherine Deneuve, Mena Suvari, Stephen Rea, Tim Roth, Justin Chambers, Daniel Mesguich, Jean-Pierre Castaldi, Nick Moran, Steve Speirs, Michael Byrne, David Schofield, Jeremy Clyde, Bill Treacher, Tsilla Chelton, Sonic Youth	
S E P T E M B E R	7	Rock Star	Warner Bros. Pictures / Bel-Air Entertainment	Stephen Herek (director); John Stockwell (screenplay); Mark Wahlberg, Jennifer Aniston, Dominic West, Timothy Spall, Timothy Olyphant, Jason Flemyng, Blas Elias, Nick Catanese, Brian Vander Ark, Jason Bonham, Zakk Wylde, Jeff Pilson, Kara Zediker, Heidi Mark, Rachel Hunter, Carrie Stevens, Amy Miller, Dagmara Dominczyk, Stephan Jenkins, Michael Shamus Wiles, Beth Grant, Matthew Glave, Myles Kennedy, Ralph Saenz, Carey Lessard, Kristin Richardson	
S E P T E M B E R	7	Soul Survivors	Artisan Entertainment	Stephen Carpenter (director/screenplay); Melissa Sagemiller, Casey Affleck, Eliza Dushku, Wes Bentley, Luke Wilson, Angela Featherstone, Allen Hamilton, Carl Paoli, Barbara E. Robertson, Richard Pickren, Rick Snyder, Candace Kroslak	
S E P T E M B E R	7	Two Can Play That Game	Screen Gems	Mark Brown (director/screenplay); Vivica A. Fox, Morris Chestnut, Anthony Anderson, Gabrielle Union, Wendy Raquel Robinson, Tamala Jones, Bobby Brown, Mo'Nique, Ray Wise, Dondre T. Whitfield, Chris Spencer, Mark Christopher Lawrence, Natashia Williams	
S E P T E M B E R	14	The Glass House	Columbia Pictures	Mark Brown (director); Wesley Strick (screenplay); Leelee Sobieski, Diane Lane, Stellan Skarsgård, Bruce Dern, Kathy Baker, Trevor Morgan, Chris Noth, Rita Wilson, Michael O'Keefe, Vyto Ruginis, Gavin O'Connor, Carly Pope, China Jesusita Shavers, Agnes Bruckner, Michael Paul Chan, Rachel Wilson, Rutanya Alda, Erick Avari, John Billingsley, January Jones, Julia Vera	
S E P T E M B E R	14	Hardball	Paramount Pictures / Fireworks Pictures	Brian Robbins (director); John Gatins (screenplay); Keanu Reeves, Diane Lane, D.B. Sweeney, John Hawkes, Bryan C. Hearne, Michael Perkins, DeWayne Warren, Julian Griffith, Michael B. Jordan, A. Delon Ellis Jr., Brian M. Reed, Kristopher Lofton, Mike McGlone, Graham Beckel, Sammy Sosa, Sterling "Steelo" Brim, Wa-King Conner	
S E P T E M B E R	21	Glitter	20th Century Fox / Columbia Pictures	Vondie Curtis-Hall (director); Kate Lanier (screenplay); Mariah Carey, Max Beesley, Terrence Howard, Da Brat, Tia Texada, Eric Benét, Valarie Pettiford, Ann Magnuson, Dorian Harewood, Padma Lakshmi, Bill Sage, Isabel Gomes, Lindsey Pickering, Courtnie Beceiro, Grant Nickalls, Kate Stebbins, Kim Roberts	
S E P T E M B E R	28	Don't Say a Word	20th Century Fox / Regency Enterprises / Village Roadshow Pictures	Gary Fleder (director); Anthony Peckham, Patrick Smith Kelly (screenplay); Michael Douglas, Sean Bean, Brittany Murphy, Guy Torry, Jennifer Esposito, Famke Janssen, Oliver Platt, Skye McCole Bartusiak, Shawn Doyle, Victor Argo, Conrad Goode, Paul Schulze, Lance Reddick, Aidan Devine, Alex Campbell, Arlene Duncan, Judy Sinclair, David Warshofsky, Darren Frost, Daniel Kash, Lucie Laurier, Patricia Mauceri	
S E P T E M B E R	28	Hearts in Atlantis	Warner Bros. Pictures / Castle Rock Entertainment / Village Roadshow Pictures	Scott Hicks (director); William Goldman (screenplay); Anthony Hopkins, Anton Yelchin, Hope Davis, Mika Boorem, David Morse, Deirdre O'Connell, Will Rothhaar, Timmy Reifsnyder, Alan Tudyk, Tom Bower, Celia Weston, Adam LeFevre	
S E P T E M B E R	28	Zoolander	Paramount Pictures / Village Roadshow Pictures / VH1 Films	Ben Stiller (director/screenplay); Drake Sather, John Hamburg (screenplay); Ben Stiller, Owen Wilson, Will Ferrell, Christine Taylor, Milla Jovovich, Jerry Stiller, David Duchovny, Jon Voight, Vince Vaughn, Judah Friedlander, Alexander Skarsgard, Nathan Lee Graham, Justin Theroux, Andrew Wilson, John Vargas, Jennifer Coolidge, Tony Kanal, Patton Oswalt, Mason Webb, David Bowie, Billy Zane, Lance Bass, Tyson Beckford, Victoria Beckham, Emma Bunton, Stephen Dorff, Shavo Odadjian, Fred Durst, Fabio, Tom Ford, Cuba Gooding Jr., Theo Kogan, Lukas Haas, Tommy Hilfiger, Paris Hilton, Carmen Kass, Heidi Klum, Lenny Kravitz, Karl Lagerfeld, Lil' Kim, Anne Meara, Natalie Portman, Frankie Rayder, Mark Ronson, Gavin Rossdale, Winona Ryder, Garry Shandling, Christian Slater, Gwen Stefani, Donald Trump, Melania Trump, Donatella Versace, Veronica Webb, James Marsden	

== October–December ==
Opening		Title	Production company	Cast and crew
O C T O B E R	5	Joy Ride	20th Century Fox / Regency Enterprises	John Dahl (director); J. J. Abrams, Clay Tarver (screenplay); Paul Walker, Steve Zahn, Leelee Sobieski, Jessica Bowman, Matthew Kimbrough, Ted Levine, Stuart Stone, Brian Leckner, Jim Beaver, Hugh Dane, Jay Hernandez, Basil Wallace, Satch Huizenga, Luis Côrtes, Kenneth White, Anna Malle
O C T O B E R	5	Max Keeble's Big Move	Walt Disney Pictures	Tim Hill (director); David L. Watts, James Greer, Jonathan Bernstein, Mark Blackwell (screenplay); Alex D. Linz, Josh Peck, Zena Grey, Larry Miller, Robert Carradine, Nora Dunn, Jamie Kennedy, Noel Fisher, Orlando Brown, Brooke Anne Smith, Myra Ambriz, Justin Berfield, Clifton Davis, Amy Hill, Amber Valletta, Veronica Alicino, Greg Lewis, Dennis Haskins, Chely Wright, Kyle Sullivan, Shawn Pyfrom, Countess Vaughn, Adam Lamberg, Tony Hawk, Lil' Romeo, Marcus Hopson
O C T O B E R	5	Serendipity	Miramax Films	Peter Chelsom (director); Marc Klein (screenplay); John Cusack, Kate Beckinsale, Bridget Moynahan, John Corbett, Jeremy Piven, Eugene Levy, Molly Shannon, Marcia Bennett, Eve Crawford, Evan Neuman, Buck Henry, Lucy Gordon, Kevin Rice, Gary Gerbrandt
O C T O B E R	5	Training Day	Warner Bros. Pictures / Village Roadshow Pictures	Antoine Fuqua (director); David Ayer (screenplay); Denzel Washington, Ethan Hawke, Eva Mendes, Scott Glenn, Cliff Curtis, Snoop Dogg, Harris Yulin, Dr. Dre, Tom Berenger, Macy Gray, Raymond Cruz, Peter Greene, Nick Chinlund, Terry Crews, Noel Gugliemi, Charlotte Ayanna, Raymond J. Barry, Seidy Lopez, Cle Shaheed Sloan, Denzel Whitaker, Fran Kranz, Jaime P. Gomez, Samantha Esteban, Rudy Pérez, Abel Soto
O C T O B E R	9	Scooby-Doo and the Cyber Chase	Warner Home Video	Jim Stenstrum (director); Mark Turosz (screenplay); Scott Innes, Frank Welker, Grey DeLisle, B.J. Ward, Joe Alaskey, Bob Bergen, Tom Kane, Mikey Kelley, Gary Sturgis, Glenn Shadix, Michael Brandon, Rob Paulsen, Doug Preis, Chris Phillips, Rodger Bumpass, Matthew Labyorteaux
O C T O B E R	12	Bandits	Metro-Goldwyn-Mayer / Hyde Park Entertainment / Baltimore/Spring Creek Pictures	Barry Levinson (director); Harley Peyton (screenplay); Bruce Willis, Billy Bob Thornton, Cate Blanchett, Troy Garity, Brían F. O'Byrne, Stacey Travis, Bobby Slayton, January Jones, Azura Skye, Peggy Miley, William Converse-Roberts, Richard Riehle, Micole Mercurio, Scott Burkholder, Anthony Burch, Sam Levinson, Scout LaRue Willis, Tallulah Belle Willis
O C T O B E R	12	Corky Romano	Touchstone Pictures	Rob Pritts (director); David Garrett, Jason Ward (screenplay); Chris Kattan, Vinessa Shaw, Peter Berg, Chris Penn, Richard Roundtree, Fred Ward, Peter Falk, Matthew Glave, Roger Fan, Dave Sheridan, Michael Massee, Vincent Pastore, Zach Galifianakis, Rena Mero
O C T O B E R	12	Dancing at the Blue Iguana	Lions Gate Entertainment	Michael Radford (director/screenplay); David Linter (screenplay); Charlotte Ayanna, Daryl Hannah, Sheila Kelley, Elias Koteas, Vladimir Mashkov, Sandra Oh, Jennifer Tilly, Robert Ray Wisdom, Kristin Bauer, W. Earl Brown, Chris Hogan, Rodney Rowland, Jesse Bradford, Bill Chott, Maurice Compte, Jack Conley, Marta Cunningham, Pete Gardner, Ruthanna Hopper, Jason Kravits, Isabelle Pasco, Vincent Riotta, Ted Rooney, Iqbal Theba, R.C. Bates, Christina Cabot, Peggy Jo Jacobs
O C T O B E R	12	Fat Girl	Cowboy Booking International	Catherine Breillat (director/screenplay); Anaïs Reboux, Roxane Mesquida, Libero De Rienzo, Arsinée Khanjian, Romain Goupil, Laura Betti, Albert Goldberg
O C T O B E R	12	Mulholland Drive	Universal Pictures	David Lynch (director/screenplay); Naomi Watts, Laura Elena Harring, Justin Theroux, Ann Miller, Mark Pellegrino, Robert Forster, Brent Briscoe, Dan Hedaya, Angelo Badalamenti, Monty Montgomery, Lee Grant, James Karen, Chad Everett, Richard Green, Rebekah Del Rio, Melissa George, Jeanne Bates, Lori Heuring, Marcus Graham, Michael J. Anderson, Patrick Fischler, Bonnie Aarons, Geno Silva, Billy Ray Cyrus, Vincent Castellanos, Rita Taggart, Michele Hicks, Lisa Lackey, Tad Horino, Tony Longo, Michael Fairman, Scott Coffey, Rena Riffel, Dan Birnbaum, Michael Cooke, Wayne Grace, Melissa Crider, Kate Forster
O C T O B E R	12	My First Mister	Paramount Classics	Christine Lahti (director); Jill Franklyn (screenplay); Albert Brooks, Leelee Sobieski, John Goodman, Carol Kane, Michael McKean, Henry Brown, Desmond Harrington, Mary Kay Place
O C T O B E R	19	Focus	Paramount Classics	Neal Slavin (director); Kendrew Lascelles (screenplay); William H. Macy, Laura Dern, David Paymer, Meat Loaf Aday, Kay Hawtrey, Kenneth Welsh, Joseph Ziegler, Peter Oldring, Wendy Lyon, Kevin Jubinville, Michael Copeman, Arlene Meadows, Robert McCarrol, Shaun Austin-Olsen, B.J. McQueen, Conrad Bergschneider
O C T O B E R	19	From Hell	20th Century Fox	Albert Hughes, Allen Hughes (directors); Terry Hayes, Rafael Yglesias (screenplay); Johnny Depp, Heather Graham, Ian Holm, Robbie Coltrane, Ian Richardson, Jason Flemyng, Samantha Spiro, Annabelle Apsion, Katrin Cartlidge, Susan Lynch, Lesley Sharp, Estelle Skornik, Paul Rhys, Vincent Franklin, Ian McNeice, David Schofield, Sophia Myles, Joanna Page, Anthony Parker
O C T O B E R	19	The Last Castle	DreamWorks	Rod Lurie (director); David Scarpa, Graham Yost, Sam Mercer (screenplay); Robert Redford, James Gandolfini, Mark Ruffalo, Steve Burton, Delroy Lindo, Paul Calderon, Samuel Ball, Jeremy Childs, Clifton Collins Jr., Brian Goodman, Michael Irby, Robin Wright, David Alford
O C T O B E R	19	Riding in Cars with Boys	Columbia Pictures	Penny Marshall (director); Morgan Ward (screenplay); Drew Barrymore, Steve Zahn, Brittany Murphy, James Woods, Lorraine Bracco, Sara Gilbert, Vincent Pastore, Marisa Ryan, Adam Garcia, Maggie Gyllenhaal, Rosie Perez, Desmond Harrington, Peter Facinelli, David Moscow, Mika Boorem, Logan Lerman, Skye McCole Bartusiak, Cody Arens, Logan Arens, Alexia Landeau, Kristin Proctor, Jordan Gelber, Kevin Thoms, Vincent De Paul, Kevin O'Rourke, John Bedford Lloyd, Paz de la Huerta, Carl Capotorto, Tracy Reiner, Jon Korkes, Gabriel Carpenter, Susan Forristal, Dusty Rizzo, Gene Canfield
O C T O B E R	19	Waking Life	Fox Searchlight Pictures	Richard Linklater (director/screenplay); Wiley Wiggins, Eamonn Healy, Timothy "Speed" Levitch, Adam Goldberg, Nicky Katt, Steven Soderbergh, Ethan Hawke, Julie Delpy, Steven Prince, Caveh Zahedi, Otto Hofmann, Richard Linklater, Alex Jones, Kim Krizan, Louis H. Mackey, David Sosa, Robert C. Solomon, Steve Brudniak
O C T O B E R	26	Donnie Darko	Newmarket Films / Pandora Cinema	Richard Kelly (director/screenplay); Jake Gyllenhaal, Jena Malone, Drew Barrymore, James Duval, Beth Grant, Maggie Gyllenhaal, Mary McDonnell, Holmes Osborne, Katharine Ross, Patrick Swayze, Noah Wyle, Alex Greenwald, Seth Rogen, Stuart Stone, Daveigh Chase, Patience Cleveland, Jolene Purdy, Arthur Taxier, David St. James, Tiler Peck, Lisa K. Wyatt, Jack Salvatore Jr., Lee Weaver, Ashley Tisdale, Jerry Trainor, Fran Kranz, Scotty Leavenworth, Michael Dukakis, Gary Lundy, David Moreland, Jazzie Mahannah, Kristina Malota, Marina Malota, Carly Naples, Rachel Winfree, Phyllis Lyons
O C T O B E R	26	K-PAX	Universal Pictures / Intermedia Films / Lawrence Gordon Productions	Iain Softley (director); Charles Leavitt (screenplay); Kevin Spacey, Jeff Bridges, Mary McCormack, Alfre Woodard, David Patrick Kelly, Saul Williams, Peter Gerety, Celia Weston, Ajay Naidu, Tracy Vilar, Melanee Murray, John Toles-Bey, Kimberly Scott, Conchata Ferrell, Vincent Laresca, Brian Howe, William Lucking, Norman Alden, Aaron Paul
O C T O B E R	26	On the Line	Miramax Films	Eric Bross (director); Eric Aronson, Paul Stanton (screenplay); Lance Bass, Joey Fatone, Emmanuelle Chriqui, GQ, Tamala Jones, Dave Foley, Jerry Stiller. James Bulliard, Richie Sambora, Amanda Foreman, Chyna, Justin Timberlake, Chris Kirkpatrick, Al Green, Ananda Lewis, Sammy Sosa, Damon Buford, Eric Young
O C T O B E R	26	Thirteen Ghosts	Warner Bros. Pictures / Dark Castle Entertainment	Steve Beck (director); Robb White, Neal Marshall Stevens (screenplay); Tony Shalhoub, Embeth Davidtz, Matthew Lillard, Shannon Elizabeth, Rah Digga, F. Murray Abraham, J.R. Bourne, Laura Mennell, C. Ernst Harth, Craig Olejnik, John DeSantis, Ken Kirzinger, Alec Roberts, Mikhael Speidel, Daniel Wesley, Kathryn Anderson, Shawna Loyer, Xantha Radley, Laurie Soper, Herbert Duncanson, Shayne Wyler, Adam Kaminski
O C T O B E R	26	Bones	New Line Cinema	Ernest Dickerson (director); Adam Simon, Tim Metcalfe (screenplay); Snoop Dogg, Pam Grier, Bianca Lawson, Clifton Powell, Khalil Kain, Ricky Harris, Michael T. Weiss, Merwin Mondesir, Sean Amsing, Katharine Isabelle, Ronald Selmour, Deezer D, Garikayi Mutambirwa, Erin Wright, Josh Byer, Kirby Morrow, Lynda Boyd
N O V E M B E R	2	Domestic Disturbance	Paramount Pictures	Harold Becker (director); Lewis Colick, William S. Comanor, Gary Drucker (screenplay); John Travolta, Vince Vaughn, Teri Polo, Matt O'Leary, Steve Buscemi, Susan Floyd, Ruben Santiago-Hudson, Chris Ellis, Angelica Page, Debra Mooney, Leland L. Jones, Holmes Osborne, Nick Loren, Jim Meskimen
N O V E M B E R	2	The Man Who Wasn't There	Gramercy Pictures	Joel Coen (director/screenplay); Ethan Coen (screenplay); Billy Bob Thornton, Frances McDormand, James Gandolfini, Michael Badalucco, Richard Jenkins, Scarlett Johansson, Jon Polito, Tony Shalhoub, Katherine Borowitz, Christopher Kriesa, Brian Haley, Jack McGee, Jennifer Jason Leigh, Gregg Binkley, Alan Fudge, Lilyan Chauvin, Ted Rooney, Abraham Benrubi, Rhoda Gemignani, Brooke Smith, Dan Martin, Booth Colman, Stanley DeSantis, Christopher McDonald, George Ives, Seymour Cassel, Geoffrey Gould, John Michael Higgins, Pete Schrum
N O V E M B E R	2	Monsters, Inc.	Walt Disney Pictures / Pixar Animation Studios	Pete Docter (director); Andrew Stanton, Daniel Gerson (screenplay); John Goodman, Billy Crystal, Mary Gibbs, Steve Buscemi, James Coburn, Jennifer Tilly, Bob Peterson, John Ratzenberger, Frank Oz, Dan Gerson, Steve Susskind, Bonnie Hunt, Jeff Pidgeon, Samuel Lord Black, Jack Angel, Bob Bergen, Rodger Bumpass, Gino Conforti, Jennifer Darling, Patti Deutsch, Pete Docter, Bobby Edner, Paul Eiding, Bill Farmer, Pat Fraley, Teresa Ganzel, Marc John Jefferies, Sherry Lynn, Danny Mann, Mona Marshall, Mickie McGowan, Laraine Newman, Kay Panabaker, Phil Proctor, Guido Quaroni, Jan Rabson, Joe Ranft, David Silverman, Jim Thornton, Lee Unkrich, Greg Berg, Donald Fullilove, Jacques Marin, Patrick Pinney, Wallace Shawn, Patty Wirtz
N O V E M B E R	2	The One	Columbia Pictures / Revolution Studios	James Wong (director/screenplay); Glen Morgan (screenplay); Jet Li, Carla Gugino, Delroy Lindo, Jason Statham, James Morrison, Dylan Bruno, Richard Steinmetz, Steve Rankin, Tucker Smallwood, Harriet Sansom Harris, Dean Norris, Darin Morgan, Mark Borchardt, Joel Stoffer, Archie Kao, George W. Bush, Al Gore, Doug Savant, Cynthia Pinot
N O V E M B E R	2	Tape	Lions Gate Films / Tape Productions	Richard Linklater (director); Stephen Belber (screenplay); Ethan Hawke, Robert Sean Leonard, Uma Thurman
N O V E M B E R	3	The Flintstones: On the Rocks	Cartoon Network Studios / Warner Bros. Television Distribution	David Smith, Chris Savino (directors/screenplay); Cindy Morrow, Clayton McKenzie Morrow (screenplay); Jeff Bergman, Tress MacNeille, Kevin Michael Richardson, Grey DeLisle, Jeff Bennett, Frank Welker, Tom Kenny, Zelda Rubinstein, John Kassir, John Stephenson, Oren Waters, Carmen Twillie, Wil Wheaton, Mark Mangini, Joey Altruda, Maxi Anderson
N O V E M B E R	6	Mickey's Magical Christmas: Snowed in at the House of Mouse	Walt Disney Home Entertainment	Tony Craig, Roberts Gannaway (directors); Kevin Campbell (screenplay); Wayne Allwine, Russi Taylor, Tony Anselmo, Tress MacNeille, Bill Farmer, Carlos Alazraqui, Jeff Bennett, Jodi Benson, Robby Benson, Corey Burton, Eddie Carroll, Pat Carroll, John Cleese, Peter Cullen, Edan Gross, Jonathan Freeman, Jennifer Hale, Maurice LaMarche, James Woods, J.P. Manoux, Mark Moseley, Paige O'Hara, Michael Gough, Patricia Parris, Rob Paulsen, Ernie Sabella, Cree Summer, Samuel E. Wright, Gilbert Gottfried, Kevin Schon, Michael Welch, April Winchell, Sally Dworsky, Andre Stojka, Nikita Hopkins, Ken Sansom, Kath Soucie, David Ogden Stiers, Blayne Weaver, Joseph Williams, Alan Young, Jim Cummings, James Earl Jones, Jack Angel, Frank Welker, Alvin Chea, Colin Davis, Joe Pizzulo, Hal Smith, Will Ryan, Clarence Nash, David Tomlinson, Pinto Colvig, James MacDonald
N O V E M B E R	9	Heist	Warner Bros. Pictures / Morgan Creek Productions / Franchise Pictures	David Mamet (director/screenplay); Gene Hackman, Danny DeVito, Delroy Lindo, Sam Rockwell, Rebecca Pidgeon, Ricky Jay, Patti LuPone
N O V E M B E R	9	Innocence	Metro-Goldwyn-Mayer / IDP Distribution / Strand Releasing	Paul Cox (director/screenplay); Julia Blake, Charles "Bud" Tingwell, Terry Norris, Marta Dusseldorp, Robert Menzies, Chris Haywood, Norman Kaye, Joey Kennedy, Paul Cox, Sheila Florance, Max Gillies, Kristine Van Pellicom, Kenny Aernouts, Liz Windsor
N O V E M B E R	9	Life as a House	New Line Cinema	Irwin Winkler (director); Mark Andrus (screenplay); Kevin Kline, Kristin Scott Thomas, Hayden Christensen, Jena Malone, Mary Steenburgen, Jamey Sheridan, Ian Somerhalder, Scott Bakula, Sam Robards, John Pankow, Mike Weinberg, Scotty Leavenworth
N O V E M B E R	9	Maze	Regent Entertainment / DEJ Productions / Starz Encore Entertainment / KBK Entertainment / Andora Pictures	Rob Morrow (director/screenplay); Nicole Burdette (screenplay); Rob Morrow, Laura Linney, Craig Sheffer, Rose Gregorio, Robert Hogan, Gia Carides, Betsy Aidem, Lanny Flaherty, Ken Leung, Frank Pugliese, Brian Greene, Jon Robin Baitz
N O V E M B E R	9	Shallow Hal	20th Century Fox	Peter Farrelly, Robert Farrelly (directors/screenplay); Sean Moynihan (screenplay); Jack Black, Gwyneth Paltrow, Jason Alexander, Joe Viterelli, Jill Christine Fitzgerald, Tony Robbins, Bruce McGill, Molly Shannon, Sasha Neulinger, Susan Ward, Rene Kirby, Kyle Gass, Laura Kightlinger, Brooke Burns, Sayed Badreya, Nan Martin, Zen Gesner, Ron Darling, Rob Moran, Michael Corrente
N O V E M B E R	16	Harry Potter and the Philosopher's Stone	Warner Bros. Pictures / Heyday Films	Chris Columbus (director); Steve Kloves (screenplay); Daniel Radcliffe, Rupert Grint, Emma Watson, John Cleese, Robbie Coltrane, Warwick Davis, Richard Griffiths, Richard Harris, Ian Hart, John Hurt, Alan Rickman, Fiona Shaw, Maggie Smith, Julie Walters, David Bradley, Tom Felton, Bonnie Wright, Devon Murray, Zoë Wanamaker, Adrian Rawlins, Geraldine Somerville, Harry Melling, Chris Rankin, James Phelps, Oliver Phelps, Matthew Lewis, Alfred Enoch, Sean Biggerstaff
N O V E M B E R	16	Novocaine	Artisan Entertainment	David Atkins (director/screenplay); Steve Martin, Helena Bonham Carter, Laura Dern, Elias Koteas, Scott Caan, Lynne Thigpen, JoBe Cerny, Chelcie Ross, Keith David, Kevin Bacon, Preston Maybank, Len Bajenski
N O V E M B E R	16	The Wash	Lions Gate Films	DJ Pooh (director/screenplay); Dr. Dre, Snoop Dogg, George Wallace, DJ Pooh, Angell Conwell, Tommy "Tiny" Lister Jr., Eminem, Bruce Bruce, Lamont Bentley, Alex Thomas, Demetrius Navarro, Truth Hurts, Shawn Fonteno, Isley Nicole Melton, Tommy Chong, Tray Deee, Kurupt, Ludacris, Shaquille O'Neal, Pauly Shore, Xzibit, Julio G, Daz Dillinger, Bad Azz, Sharif, Kent Masters King, Iva La'Shawn
N O V E M B E R	21	Black Knight	20th Century Fox / Regency Enterprises	Gil Junger (director); Darryl J. Quarles, Peter Gaulke, Gerry Swallow (screenplay); Martin Lawrence, Marsha Thomason, Tom Wilkinson, Kevin Conway, Vincent Regan, Daryl Mitchell, Michael Countryman, Jeannette Weegar, Erik Jensen, Dikran Tulaine, Helen Carey, Robert Alan Harris
N O V E M B E R	21	Out Cold	Touchstone Pictures / Spyglass Entertainment	The Malloys (director); Jon Zach (screenplay); Jason London, A.J. Cook, Lee Majors, Zach Galifianakis, Derek Hamilton, Willie Garson, Caroline Dhavernas, David Koechner, Flex Alexander, David Denman, Thomas Lennon, Victoria Silvstedt, Todd Richards, Lewis Arquette, Rio Tahara, Brett Kelly, Lee R. Mayes, Danny Hagge, Adam Harrington, Rob "Sluggo" Boyce, Ted Stryker, Steve Kahan, Richard Donner
N O V E M B E R	21	Sidewalks of New York	Paramount Classics	Edward Burns (director/screenplay); Edward Burns, Rosario Dawson, Dennis Farina, Heather Graham, David Krumholtz, Brittany Murphy, Stanley Tucci
N O V E M B E R	21	Spy Game	Universal Pictures / Beacon Pictures	Tony Scott (director); Michael Frost Beckner, David Arata (screenplay); Robert Redford, Brad Pitt, Catherine McCormack, Stephen Dillane, Larry Bryggman, Marianne Jean-Baptiste, Ken Leung, David Hemmings, Michael Paul Chan, Garrick Hagon, Todd Boyce, Matthew Marsh, Andrew Grainger, Shane Rimmer, Ho Yi, Benedict Wong, Adrian Pang, Omid Djalili, Dale Dye, Charlotte Rampling, Matthew Walker, James Aubrey, Colin Stinton, Amidou, Andrea Osvart
N O V E M B E R	23	In the Bedroom	Miramax Films	Todd Field (director/screenplay); Robert Festinger (screenplay); Sissy Spacek, Tom Wilkinson, Nick Stahl, Marisa Tomei, William Mapother, Celia Weston, Karen Allen, William Wise, Justin Ashforth, Camden Munson, Frank T. Wells
N O V E M B E R	30	The Affair of the Necklace	Warner Bros. Pictures / Alcon Entertainment	Charles Shyer (director); John Sweet (screenplay); Hilary Swank, Jonathan Pryce, Simon Baker, Adrien Brody, Joely Richardson, Christopher Walken, Brian Cox, Simon Shackleton, Hermione Gulliford, Hayden Panettiere
N O V E M B E R	30	Behind Enemy Lines	20th Century Fox / Davis Entertainment	John Moore (director); David Veloz, Zak Penn (screenplay); Owen Wilson, Gene Hackman, Vladimir Mashkov, Joaquim de Almeida, David Keith, Olek Krupa, Gabriel Macht, Charles Malik Whitfield, Eyal Podell, Geoff Pierson, Tarik Filipovic
N O V E M B E R	30	The Independent	Arrow Entertainment	Stephen Kessler (director/screenplay); Mike Wilkins (screenplay); Jerry Stiller, Janeane Garofalo, Max Perlich, Ben Stiller, Anne Meara, Ron Howard, Roger Corman, Peter Bogdanovich, John Lydon, Andy Dick, Fred Dryer, Jonathan Katz, Fred Williamson, Karen Black, Nick Cassavetes, Julie Strain, Ginger Lynn, Ted Demme, Paul Logan, Stacy Fuson, Mike Wilkins, Ethan Embry, James 'Kimo' Wills, Phil Proctor, Louisa Moritz, Priscilla Taylor, Greg Behrendt, Victoria Silvstedt, Debbie Lee Carrington, S.A. Griffin, Jennifer Elise Cox, Billy Burke, Brittany Andrews, Amy Stiller, John Finnegan, Larry Hankin, Ken Michelman, Dana Gould, Jude Herrera, Richard Paul, Sam Anderson, Bill Gerber, Laura Kightlinger, Jay Johnston, Bob Odenkirk, Owen Bush, Aki Aleong, Michael Berryman, Elina Madison, Stuart Stone, Brian Posehn, Stephen Kessler
N O V E M B E R	30	Texas Rangers	Dimension Films	Steve Miner (director); Scott Busby, Martin Copeland, John Milius (screenplay); James Van Der Beek, Dylan McDermott, Usher Raymond, Ashton Kutcher, Robert Patrick, Rachael Leigh Cook, Leonor Varela, Randy Travis, Jon Abrahams, Matt Keeslar, Vincent Spano, Marco Leonardi, Tom Skerritt, Alfred Molina, Oded Fehr, Joe Spano, Jordan Brower, James Coburn, Brian Martell, Joe Rentería, Breon Gorman
D E C E M B E R	4	Beethoven's 4th	Universal Studios Home Entertainment	David Mickey Evans (director); John Loy (screenplay); Judge Reinhold, Julia Sweeney, Joe Pichler, Matt McCoy, Veanne Cox, Jeff Coopwood, Dorien Wilson, Mark Lindsay Chapman, Art LaFleur, Dr. Joyce Brothers, David Mickey Evans, Michaela Gallo, Kaleigh Krish, Nick Meaney, Natalie Elizabeth Marston, June Lu
D E C E M B E R	4	Pokemon: Mewtwo Returns	Warner Home Video / Nintendo / 4Kids Entertainment / OLM, Inc. / Shogakukan Productions	Kunihiko Yuyama, Masamitsu Hidaka (directors); Hideki Sonoda (screenplay); Veronica Taylor, Ikue Ōtani, Rachael Lillis, Eric Stuart, Satomi Koorogi, Ken Gates, Maddie Blaustein, Dan Green, Ed Paul, Kerry Williams, Lee Quick, Amy Birnbaum, Scottie Ray, Megan Hollingshead
D E C E M B E R	7	Ocean's Eleven	Warner Bros. Pictures / Village Roadshow Pictures / Jerry Weintraub Productions	Steven Soderbergh (director); Ted Griffin (screenplay); George Clooney, Matt Damon, Andy García, Brad Pitt, Julia Roberts, Casey Affleck, Scott Caan, Elliott Gould, Bernie Mac, Carl Reiner, Eddie Jemison, Don Cheadle, Shaobo Qin, Minka Kelly, Holly Marie Combs, Topher Grace, Joshua Jackson, Barry Watson, Shane West, Steven Soderbergh, Siegfried and Roy, Wayne Newton, Henry Silva, Angie Dickinson, Wladimir Klitschko, Lennox Lewis, Jerry Weintraub, Mark Gantt, Miguel Pérez, Robert Peters, Michael DeLano, Robin Sachs, J.P. Manoux, Eydie Gorme, Steve Lawrence, Jim Lampley, Larry Merchant, Scott L. Schwartz, Vincent M. Ward, Viola Davis, Jacob "Stitch" Duran, Charles Halford, David Leitch, Thomas Rosales Jr., Kerry Rossall
D E C E M B E R	9	The Day Reagan Was Shot	Showtime Networks / Paramount Television	Cyrus Nowrasteh (director/screenplay); Richard Dreyfuss, Richard Crenna, Colm Feore, Michael Murphy, Holland Taylor, Kenneth Welsh, Leon Pownall, Beau Starr, Alex Carter, Sean McCann, Michael Greene, Yannick Bisson, Brendan Connor, Neil Crone, Dan Duran, Robert Bockstael, Andrew Tarbet, Christian Lloyd, Jack Jessop, John Connolly, Angela Gei, Frank Moore, Ken James, Oliver Dennis, Bernard Behrens, Tiffanie Bell, Wayne Best
D E C E M B E R	14	Iris	Miramax Films / BBC Films / Intermedia Films	Richard Eyre (director/screenplay); Charles Wood (screenplay); Judi Dench, Kate Winslet, Jim Broadbent, Hugh Bonneville, Penelope Wilton, Juliet Aubrey, Timothy West, Samuel West, Siobhan Hayes, Kris Marshall
D E C E M B E R	14	Not Another Teen Movie	Columbia Pictures	Joel Gallen (director); Mike Bender, Adam Jay Epstein, Andrew Jacobson, Phil Beauman, Buddy Johnson (screenplay); Chyler Leigh, Chris Evans, Jaime Pressly, Eric Christian Olsen, Eric Jungmann, Mia Kirshner, Deon Richmond, Cody McMains, Sam Huntington, Samm Levine, Cerina Vincent, Ron Lester, Lacey Chabert, Riley Smith, Julie Welch, Samaire Armstrong, Nectar Rose, Ed Lauter, Randy Quaid, JoAnna Garcia, Beverly Polcyn, Rob Benedict, Patrick St. Esprit, Josh Radnor, Paul Goebel, George Wyner, H. Jon Benjamin, Molly Ringwald, Mr. T, Kyle Cease, Melissa Joan Hart, Lyman Ward, Paul Gleason, Sean Patrick Thomas, Good Charlotte
D E C E M B E R	14	The Royal Tenenbaums	Touchstone Pictures	Wes Anderson (director/screenplay); Owen Wilson (screenplay); Danny Glover, Gene Hackman, Anjelica Huston, Bill Murray, Gwyneth Paltrow, Ben Stiller, Luke Wilson, Owen Wilson, Seymour Cassel, Grant Rosenmeyer, Jonah Meyerson, Stephen Lea Sheppard, Kumar Pallana, Alec Baldwin
D E C E M B E R	14	The Other Side of Heaven	Excel Entertainment Group	Mitch Davis (director/screenplay); Christopher Gorham, Anne Hathaway, Joe Folau, Nathaniel Lees, Miriama Smith, lvin Fitiseman, Magasiva, John Summer
D E C E M B E R	14	Vanilla Sky	Paramount Pictures / Summit Entertainment / Cruise/Wagner Productions	Cameron Crowe (director/screenplay); Tom Cruise, Penélope Cruz, Kurt Russell, Jason Lee, Noah Taylor, Cameron Diaz, Timothy Spall, Tilda Swinton, Michael Shannon, Ken Leung, Shalom Harlow, Oona Hart, Ivana Miličević, Johnny Galecki, Alicia Witt, Laura Fraser, Conan O'Brien, Tommy Lee
D E C E M B E R	19	The Lord of the Rings: The Fellowship of the Ring	New Line Cinema	Peter Jackson (director/screenplay); Fran Walsh, Philippa Boyens (screenplay); Elijah Wood, Ian McKellen, Liv Tyler, Viggo Mortensen, Sean Astin, Cate Blanchett, John Rhys-Davies, Billy Boyd, Dominic Monaghan, Orlando Bloom, Christopher Lee, Hugo Weaving, Sean Bean, Ian Holm, Andy Serkis, Marton Csokas, Sala Baker, David Weatherley, Lawrence Makoare, Craig Parker, Mark Ferguson, Peter McKenzie, Harry Sinclair, Peter Jackson, Alan Howard, Sarah McLeod, Ian Mune, Cameron Rhodes, Martyn Sanderson, Jed Brophy, Randall William Cook, Sabine Crossen, Ben Fransham, Ray Henwood, Tim Kano, Bret McKenzie, Shane Rangi, Andrew Stehlin, Josh Widdicombe
D E C E M B E R	21	A Beautiful Mind	Universal Pictures / DreamWorks / Imagine Entertainment	Ron Howard (director); Akiva Goldsman (screenplay); Russell Crowe, Ed Harris, Jennifer Connelly, Paul Bettany, Adam Goldberg, Judd Hirsch, Josh Lucas, Anthony Rapp, Christopher Plummer, Jason Gray-Stanford, Austin Pendleton, Vivien Cardone
D E C E M B E R	21	The Business of Strangers	IFC Films	Patrick Stettner (director/screenplay); Stockard Channing, Julia Stiles, Fred Weller
D E C E M B E R	21	How High	Universal Pictures / Jersey Films / Native Pictures	Jesse Dylan (director); Dustin Abraham (screenplay); Method Man, Redman, Obba Babatundé, Melissa Peterman, Mike Epps, Anna Maria Horsford, Fred Willard, Jeffrey Jones, Héctor Elizondo, Lark Voorhies, Al Shearer, Essence Atkins, T.J. Thyne, Spalding Gray, Cypress Hill, Chuck Liddell, Pat Finn, Garrett Morris, Judah Friedlander, Chuck Deezy, Chris Elwood, Trieu Tran, Justin Urich, Dennison Samaroo
D E C E M B E R	21	Jimmy Neutron: Boy Genius	Paramount Pictures / Nickelodeon Movies / O Entertainment / DNA Productions	John A. Davis (director/screenplay); David N. Weiss, J. David Stem, Steve Oedekerk (screenplay); Debi Derryberry, Patrick Stewart, Martin Short, Rob Paulsen, Jeffrey Garcia, Carolyn Lawrence, Crystal Scales, Frank Welker, Candi Milo, Megan Cavanagh, Mark DeCarlo, Carlos Alazraqui, Kimberly Brooks, Andrea Martin, Billy West, Dee Bradley Baker, David L. Lander, Jim Cummings, Laraine Newman, Greg Eagles, Bob Goen, Mary Hart, John A. Davis, Keith Alcorn, Shaun Fleming, Paul Greenberg, Jeannie Elias, Dale Raoul, Lanei Chapman, Marsha Kramer, Andrea Taylor, Joel Swetow, Jeff Fischer, David Arnott, David Randolph
D E C E M B E R	21	Joe Somebody	20th Century Fox / Regency Enterprises / Kopelson Entertainment	John Pasquin (director); John Scott Shepherd (screenplay); Tim Allen, Julie Bowen, Kelly Lynch, Greg Germann, Hayden Panettiere, Patrick Warburton, Jim Belushi, Ken Marino, Wolfgang Bodison, Cristi Conaway, Robert Joy, Tina Lifford
D E C E M B E R	21	The Majestic	Warner Bros. Pictures / Castle Rock Entertainment / Village Roadshow Pictures	Frank Darabont (director); Michael Sloane (screenplay); Jim Carrey, Bob Balaban, Brent Briscoe, Jeffrey DeMunn, Amanda Detmer, Allen Garfield, Hal Holbrook, Laurie Holden, Martin Landau, Ron Rifkin, David Ogden Stiers, James Whitmore, Susan Willis, Catherine Dent, Brian Howe, Chelcie Ross, Daniel von Bargen, Shawn Doyle, Mario Roccuzzo, Bill Gratton, Scotty Leavenworth, Earl Boen, Bruce Campbell, Cliff Curtis, Matt Damon, Garry Marshall, Paul Mazursky, Sydney Pollack, Carl Reiner, Rob Reiner, Gerry Black, Karl Bury, Matt G. Wiens
D E C E M B E R	25	Ali	Columbia Pictures / Peters Entertainment	Michael Mann (director/screenplay); Eric Roth, Stephen J. Rivele, Christopher Wilkinson (screenplay); Will Smith, Jamie Foxx, Jon Voight, Mario Van Peebles, Ron Silver, Jeffrey Wright, Mykelti Williamson, James Toney, Jada Pinkett Smith, Nona Gaye, Michael Michele, Joe Morton, Paul Rodriguez, Bruce McGill, Barry Shabaka Henley, Giancarlo Esposito, Laurence Mason, LeVar Burton, Albert Hall, David Cubitt, Michael Bentt, Charles Shufford, Leon Robinson, Ted Levine, Shari Watson, Victoria Dillard, Brad Greenquist
D E C E M B E R	25	Kate & Leopold	Miramax Films	James Mangold (director/screenplay); Steven Rogers (screenplay); Meg Ryan, Hugh Jackman, Liev Schreiber, Breckin Meyer, Natasha Lyonne, Bradley Whitford, Paxton Whitehead, Spalding Gray, Josh Stamberg, Matthew Sussman, Charlotte Ayanna, Philip Bosco, Cole Hawkins, Kristen Schaal, Viola Davis
D E C E M B E R	25	The Shipping News	Miramax Films	Lasse Hallström (director); Robert Nelson Jacobs (screenplay); Kevin Spacey, Julianne Moore, Judi Dench, Cate Blanchett, Pete Postlethwaite, Scott Glenn, Rhys Ifans, Gordon Pinsent, Jason Behr, Larry Pine, Jeanetta Arnette, Katherine Moennig, Marc Lawrence, John Dunsworth
D E C E M B E R	26	Gosford Park	USA Films	Robert Altman (director); Julian Fellowes (screenplay); Eileen Atkins, Bob Balaban, Alan Bates, Charles Dance, Stephen Fry, Michael Gambon, Richard E. Grant, Derek Jacobi, Kelly Macdonald, Helen Mirren, Jeremy Northam, Clive Owen, Ryan Philippe, Maggie Smith, Kristin Scott Thomas, Emily Watson, Camilla Rutherford, Geraldine Somerville, Tom Hollander, Natasha Wightman, James Wilby, Claudie Blakley, Laurence Fox, Trent Ford, Jeremy Swift, Sophie Thompson, Meg Wynn Owen, Adrian Scarborough, Frank Thornton, Ron Webster
D E C E M B E R	28	I Am Sam	New Line Cinema	Jessie Nelson (director/screenplay); Kristine Johnson (screenplay); Sean Penn, Michelle Pfeiffer, Dianne Wiest, Dakota Fanning, Richard Schiff, Doug Hutchison, Loretta Devine, Laura Dern, Marin Hinkle, Stanley DeSantis, Brad Silverman, Rosalind Chao, Ken Jenkins, Wendy Phillips, Scott Paulin, Kimberly Scott, Michael B. Silver, Eileen Ryan, Mary Steenburgen, Jen Taylor, Brent Spiner, Elle Fanning, Kathleen Robertson, Roma Maffia, Molly Gordon
D E C E M B E R	28	Black Hawk Down	Columbia Pictures / Revolution Studios / Jerry Bruckheimer Films / Scott Free Productions	Ridley Scott (director); Ken Nolan (screenplay); Josh Hartnett, Tom Sizemore, Ewan McGregor, Jeremy Piven, Eric Bana, Ewen Bremner, William Fichtner, Tom Hardy, Sam Shepard, Jason Isaacs, Glenn Morshower, Orlando Bloom, Gabriel Casseus, Hugh Dancy, Ioan Gruffudd, Tom Guiry, Charlie Hofheimer, Danny Hoch, Brendan Sexton III, Brian Van Holt, Ian Virgo, Gregory Sporleder, Carmine Giovinazzo, Chris Beetem, Matthew Marsden, Enrique Murciano, Michael Roof, Kent Linville, Kim Coates, Steven Ford, Željko Ivanek, Johnny Strong, Nikolaj Coster-Waldau, Richard Tyson, Ron Eldard, Boyd Kestner, Pavel Vokoun, George Harris, Razaaq Adoti, Treva Etienne, Ty Burrell

== See also ==
- List of 2001 box office number-one films in the United States
- 2001 in the United States
