= Demoted =

- DVD Release
- Directed by: J. B. Rogers
- Written by: Dan Callahan; Adam Ellison
- Produced by: Darrel Casalino; Olga Mirimskaya; Ned Adams; Arcadiy Golubovich
- Starring: Michael Vartan; Sean Astin; Celia Weston; David Cross; Billy West; Sara Foster
- Cinematography: David Insley
- Edited by: Michael L. Sale
- Music by: David Kitay
- Release date: March 12, 2011
- Running time: 109 minutes
- Country: United States
- Language: English

Demoted is a 2011 American comedy film directed by J. B. Rogers and starring Michael Vartan, Sean Astin, Celia Weston, David Cross, Billy West and Sara Foster.

== Plot ==
Rodney and Mike are two of the top salesmen at Treadline Tire Company. Despite their mean treatment of both the secretaries, led by Jane, and annoying co-worker Kenny Castro, the two are well liked by their boss Bob Ferrell and after a great win in softball, after which ends with Mike gives Castro a wedgie, the duo spend a wild night at a strip club with their boss.

The next day, Rodney and Mike come into work to learn that Mr. Ferrell has died of a heart attack. Due to his seniority in the company, Castro takes his place. Rather than fire Mike and Rodney, which would result in the two of them receiving severance packages, Castro demotes them to secretaries. Rodney is assigned to the sadistic Earl Frank, while Mike is paired with new executive Elizabeth Holland, whom Castro has a crush on. At home, Rodney lies to his fiancee Jennifer Daniels and her father JR Daniels that he has received a promotion at work.

Desperate to take back their old jobs, Rodney and Mike try to befriend the other secretaries, who happen to hate Castro as much as they do. While the group seeks revenge on Castro, trapping him in a bathroom flooding with toilet water, the duo also help their new co-workers with their personal lives. For example, they help the fat Betty lose weight, confront another office worker who had a one-night stand with Tina and help the new girl Olivia figure out the perfect anniversary gift for her husband, which they claim is a blow job. They also help the ladies' softball team win the Secretaries' League title. While Rodney and Jane try to keep the unsuspecting Jennifer under the impression that he's been promoted, the womanizing Mike starts falling for Elizabeth, who eventually takes him out bowling.

All the while, Castro acts excessively mean to Rodney, Mike and the secretaries, moves that eventually cause him to blow a deal with Reilly Auto Parts, a national chain that would make Treadline one of the top tire brands in the country. The final straw comes when Castro destroys the secretaries' break room. Led by Mike and Rodney, the secretaries storm outside and protest, eventually forming a union. Unfortunately for Rodney, his secret is revealed when Jennifer and JR catch him participating in the protest on the local news, which leads to Jennifer calling off their engagement.

The next day, Rodney goes to Castro begging for his old job back, but Castro refuses, saying there was never a chance of that. Rather, desperate to make up the loss of the Reilly deal to corporate, Castro reveals that he will lay off the newly unionized secretaries at the end of the month. Along with Mike and Jane, who always wanted to be a salesperson, Rodney meets up with the Reilly executives himself, and the trio successfully close the deal just as a furious Castro bursts into the room. He challenges them to a fight and gets knocked out by Mike.

Finally receiving his old job back thanks to the Reilly deal, Rodney goes to apologize to Jennifer. He ends up stripping naked in front of her entire street proclaiming his love for her, fulfilling a promise he made earlier in the film. As Jennifer begs him to stop, it's revealed that all the secretaries have talked to her, telling her all the good he's done. Jennifer tells the naked Rodney how proud of him she is, and the two reconcile.

In the end, Rodney marries Jennifer, Mike begins officially dating Elizabeth, Jane has become a sales rep for Treadline and the secretaries now have a new and much improved break room, Rodney and Mike are now running the company, and Rodney finally wins JR's approval. The film ends with Castro, now himself demoted, dancing for traffic dressed in an embarrassing tire costume.

== Cast ==
- Sean Astin as Mike
- Michael Vartan as Rodney
- David Cross as Ken Castro
- Billy West as Robert Reilly
- Sara Foster as Jennifer Daniels
- Constance Zimmer as Elizabeth Holland
- Erin Cahill as Amy
- Celia Weston as Jane
- Cleo King as Betty
- Ron White as Earl Frank
- Cathy Shim as Olivia
- Robert Klein as Bob Farrell
- Jay Johnston as Kline
- Patrick St. Esprit as JR Daniels
- George Back as O'Donnell
- Jill Bartlett as Tina
