= The Independent (2000 film) =

2000 American mockumentary film

- DVD cover
- Directed by: Stephen Kessler
- Written by: Stephen Kessler; Mike Wilkins
- Produced by: United Lotus Group
- Starring: Jerry Stiller; Janeane Garofalo; Max Perlich; Ben Stiller
- Cinematography: Amir Hamed
- Edited by: Chris Franklin
- Music by: Ben Vaughn
- Distributed by: Arrow Entertainment
- Release dates: March 2000 (South by Southwest); November 30, 2001
- Running time: 80 minutes
- Country: United States
- Language: English
- Box office: $238,431

The Independent is a 2000 mockumentary comedy film directed by Stephen Kessler and starring Jerry Stiller and Janeane Garofalo. Stiller portrays an independent film maker who makes little-known B movies with titles like Twelve Angry Men and a Baby. The film spoofs independent directors and independent film. The film features Max Perlich and cameos by Anne Meara, Ron Howard, Roger Corman, Peter Bogdanovich, John Lydon, Ben Stiller, Andy Dick, Fred Dryer, Jonathan Katz, Fred Williamson, Karen Black, Nick Cassavetes, Julie Strain and adult film actress Ginger Lynn. The fictional career of Morty Fineman (Stiller) includes having made 427 films, although it is not specified as to whether he directed them all or if it refers to films produced or written by the Fineman character. The theme song The Love Song For 'The Independent' is performed by Nancy Sinatra.

The film premiered at the 2000 South by Southwest Film Festival, and released to theatres on November 30, 2001.

== Reception ==
On review aggregator website Rotten Tomatoes, the film holds an approval rating of 60% based on 48 reviews. On Metacritic, which assigns a normalized rating to reviews, the film has a weighted average score of 52 out of 100, based on 17 critics, indicating "mixed or average reviews".
