= Sweet November (2001 film) =

2001 film by Pat O'Connor

- Theatrical release poster
- Directed by: Pat O'Connor
- Screenplay by: Kurt Voelker
- Story by: Paul Yurick; Kurt Voelker
- Based on: Sweet November by Herman Raucher
- Produced by: Elliott Kastner; Steven Reuther; Deborah Aal; Erwin Stoff
- Starring: Keanu Reeves; Charlize Theron; Jason Isaacs; Greg Germann
- Cinematography: Edward Lachman
- Edited by: Anne V. Coates
- Music by: Christopher Young
- Production companies: Bel Air Entertainment; 3 Arts Entertainment
- Distributed by: Warner Bros. Pictures
- Release date: February 16, 2001
- Running time: 120 minutes
- Country: United States
- Language: English
- Budget: $40 million
- Box office: $65.8 million

Sweet November is a 2001 American romantic drama film based in San Francisco directed by Pat O'Connor and starring Keanu Reeves and Charlize Theron. The film is loosely based on the 1968 film written by Herman Raucher, which starred Anthony Newley and Sandy Dennis; with some differences in plot. The film reunites Reeves and Theron, who starred in Devil’s Advocate.

Sweet November was released on February 16, 2001 by Warner Bros. Pictures, and was panned by critics, who called it "schmaltzy and manipulative", while the plot and the lack of chemistry between Reeves and Theron were also criticized. The film was also a box office disappointment, grossing only $65.8 million worldwide against a budget of $40 million.

== Plot ==
Nelson Moss is a workaholic advertising executive who meets Sara Deever, a woman very different from anyone he has met before, at the DMV. His attempt to get an answer from her on his driving test leads to her failing, as the instructor sees their interaction and believes it is she who is cheating.

Sara beguiles Nelson and continually asks him to spend a month with her on the promise that she will change his life for the better. On the first night of November, after he is fired and dumped on the same day, she sleeps with him, and the next day Chaz, a close friend and neighbor of Sara's, arrives and refers to Nelson as Sara's "November".

Throughout November, the two experience happy times together and fall in love. Nelson examines his life and past, and befriends a 10-year-old fatherless child named Abner. When he realizes he is in love with Sara, he asks her to marry him. It is revealed that Sara has terminal cancer, non-Hodgkin lymphoma.

Because she cannot bear to have Nelson experience her death, Sara asks him to leave. When she tells Chaz that Nelson proposed, he points out that it is not the first time, implying she has had numerous "months" before. Sara confirms this but claims it was the first time she had wanted to say yes.

Sara decides she will not continue the relationship, to protect Nelson from being hurt. He complies, but then stages a surprise return during the Thanksgiving holiday, giving her gifts to remind her of their happy times.

They stay together for one more day; Nelson hangs November calendars all over her apartment walls, saying it can always be November for them. They make love, but the next morning, he finds Sara is dressed. She asks him to leave, and he sees she has taken down the calendars.

Sara runs out of her apartment with Nelson chasing her through the streets, until finally she stops along a foot bridge to the park entrance. There, she asks him to let her go so that he will always have happy memories of her, and explains that this is how she needs to be remembered. Sara will return home to her family (whom she had been avoiding) to face her last days.

Sara then blindfolds Nelson, leads him into the park, and gives him one final kiss. He takes off the blindfold and sees that he is alone in the spot where they went on one of their first dates.

== Cast ==
- Keanu Reeves as Nelson Moss
- Charlize Theron as Sara Deever
- Jason Isaacs as Chaz Watley/Cherry
- Greg Germann as Vince Holland
- Lauren Graham as Angelica
- Liam Aiken as Abner
- Frank Langella as Edgar Price
- Ray Baker as Buddy Leach
- Michael Rosenbaum as Brandon/Brandy
- Robert Joy as Raeford Dunne
- Jason Kravits as Manny
- Tom Bullock as Al
- Susan Zelinsky as Waitress

== Music ==
No.	Title	Lyrics	Singer(s)	Length
1.	"Cellophane"	Amanda Ghost, Sacha Skarbek, Ian Dench, Lucas Burton	Amanda Ghost	3:33
2.	"Only Time (Original Version)"	Enya, Roma Ryan	Enya	3:38
3.	"Shame"	Brian Transeau	BT	3:21
4.	"Touched by an Angel"	Stevie Nicks	Stevie Nicks	4:23
5.	"The Consequences of Falling (Lenny B Remix)"	Billy Steinberg, Rick Nowels, Marie-Claire D'Ubaldo	k.d. lang	4:16
6.	"Heart Door (with Dolly Parton)"	Paula Cole	Paula Cole with Dolly Parton	4:08
7.	"My Number"	Tegan Rain Quin, Sara Keirsten Quin	Tegan and Sara	4:09
8.	"Off the Hook"	Steven Page, Ed Robertson	Barenaked Ladies	4:34
9.	"Rock DJ"	Robbie Williams, Guy Chambers, Kelvin Andrews, Nelson Pigford, Ekundayo Paris	Robbie Williams	4:16
10.	"Baby Work Out"	Jackie Wilson	Jackie Wilson, Alonzo Tucker	3:00
11.	"You Deserve to Be Loved"	Dillon O'Brian	Tracy Dawn	5:02
12.	"Wherever You Are"	Larry Klein, Tonio K	Celeste Prince	4:17
13.	"The Other Half of Me"	S. Freeman, J. Lawrence	Bobby Darin	2:27
14.	"Calafia"	Dave Ralicke	Jump with Joey
15.	"Middle of the Night"	Paul Brown, Roberto Vally, Rick Braun	Rick Braun
16.	"Time After Time"	Jules Styne, Sammy Cahn	Keanu Reeves

== Reception ==
=== Box office ===
The film opened at number 4 at the North American box office making $11,015,226 in its opening weekend behind Recess: School's Out, Down to Earth and Hannibal. It ultimately grossed $25.3 million domestically with an additional $40.5 million overseas to a total of $65.8 million worldwide.

=== Critical response ===
On Rotten Tomatoes, the film holds an approval rating of 15% based on 99 reviews, with an average rating of 3.6/10. The website's critics consensus states: "Schmaltzy and manipulative, Sweet November suffers from an implausible plot and non-existent chemistry between its leads". At Metacritic, the film has a weighted average score of 27 out of 100, based on 30 critics, indicating "generally unfavorable reviews". Audiences polled by CinemaScore gave the film an average grade of "B" on an A+ to F scale.

Todd McCarthy of Variety called it: "A contrived but entirely workable premise is given a well-tooled treatment in Sweet November, a femme-slanted doomed romance with a heavily calculated feel to it". Roger Ebert of the Chicago Sun-Times gave it one out of four, and wrote: "Passes off pathological behavior as romantic bliss. It's about two sick and twisted people playing mind games and calling it love". Peter Travers of Rolling Stone warned: "Beware all male viewers who enter here, you are in chick-movie hell".

The film was nominated for three Razzies, including Worst Remake or Sequel, Worst Actor and Worst Actress. It is listed on Golden Raspberry Award founder John Wilson's book The Official Razzie Movie Guide as one of the 100 Most Enjoyably Bad Movies Ever Made.
