= Say It Isn't So (film) =

2001 film by J. B. Rogers

- Theatrical release poster
- Directed by: J. B. Rogers
- Written by: Peter Gaulke; Gerry Swallow
- Produced by: Bobby Farrelly Peter Farrelly; Bradley Thomas
- Starring: Heather Graham; Chris Klein; Orlando Jones; Richard Jenkins; Sally Field
- Cinematography: Mark Irwin
- Edited by: Larry Madaras
- Music by: Mason Daring
- Production company: Conundrum Entertainment
- Distributed by: 20th Century Fox
- Release date: March 23, 2001
- Running time: 95 minutes
- Country: United States
- Language: English
- Budget: $25 million
- Box office: $12.3 million

Say It Isn't So is a 2001 American black comedy film directed by J. B. Rogers, written by Peter Gaulke and Gerry Swallow, and starring Heather Graham and Chris Klein as two young lovers who come to believe that they are actually siblings.

The film was both a critical and commercial failure, grossing $12.3 million on a $25 million budget. This was Suzanne Somers' final film before her death in October 2023.

== Plot ==
Gilly Noble takes a stray cat named "Ringo" to the animal shelter where he works in Shelbyville, Indiana. Gilly gets his hair cut by a beautiful young aspiring hairdresser named Jo Wingfield. As Jo cuts Gilly's hair, she mentions that she recently lost a tail-less cat named Ringo, leading Gilly to tell her that Ringo is at the pound. The excitement causes Jo to accidentally cut off a part of Gilly's ear, and he is rushed to the hospital where the ear is reattached. To make up for the incident, Jo invites Gilly to her house for lunch the next day, where Gilly meets Jo's greedy, self-centered mother, Valdine, and invalid father, Walter.

Gilly and Jo date for six months before getting engaged, but suddenly a private detective, Vic Vetter, contacts Gilly to tell him that he's Valdine and Walter's son. After Gilly and Jo end their incestuous relationship, Gilly moves in with his new family, and Jo moves to Beaver, Oregon to start a new life. After being branded a "sister-fucker", Gilly loses his job at the animal shelter and is forced to take a job removing roadkill for the highway department.

Sixteen months later, a surprise comes to the Wingfield doorstep in the form of a young man named Leon Pitofsky, who claims to be Valdine and Walter's son and presents his birth certificate as proof. Valdine and Walter feel better for a few moments before angrily lashing out at Gilly and forcing him to leave. Valdine notifies the Beaver police that Gilly is a sex offender. Gilly runs for his life and decides to go to Oregon to inform Jo. On the way to Oregon, he befriends a pilot with two prosthetic legs named Dig.

Meanwhile, Jo becomes engaged to her ex-boyfriend Jack Mitchelson, a rich and powerful young man who secretly deals in marijuana, controls over half the town by paying off numerous politicians, and cheats on Jo with his ex-girlfriend, a local cop named Gina. Valdine keeps pushing Jo to marry Jack in order to become involved with Jack's wealth, although Jo still loves Gilly. Valdine keeps Leon secluded and tells Jo that Leon is a figment of Gilly's imagination. Gilly tries to hide from the authorities, and Dig frequently aids him in his escape from Jack's henchmen, Dig aware of Jack's corruption but unable to tell anyone else abouot it.

Ultimately, Gilly is not able to stop Jo from marrying Jack, who still believes that Gilly is her brother. Police arrive at the marriage scene to inform the family that Gilly died in a car accident, which was actually an act of sabotage by Leon who has been arrested. Jo learns the truth and ends her marriage which causes Valdine to attack Leon and have a stroke. It's also revealed that Jack was behind Valdine and Walter being misidentified as Gilly's parents. But unknown to everyone, Gilly was not driving the car at the time of the accident when it was actually one of Jack's henchmen Streak. Gilly, who has just returned to working at the animal shelter, sees Jo taking a gun to the roof of the shelter and mistakenly believes that she wants to commit suicide. They are finally reunited on the roof of the same animal shelter that was a catalyst for their coming together, Jo revealing that she was just giving the "one-gun salute" to what she believed was Gilly's ashes.

A few months later, Gilly and Jo are married, and Walter, Valdine, Leon, Dig, and many other people attend, with Walter on his feet and Valdine in a wheelchair after her stroke. Also, as a surprise wedding present, Vetter arrives and tells him that he has truly found his mother, who turns out to be Suzanne Somers, ironically Gilly's childhood crush.

== Cast ==
- Heather Graham as Josephine "Jo" Wingfield
- Chris Klein as Gilbert "Gilly" Noble
- Orlando Jones as Dig McCaffrey
- Sally Field as Valdine Wingfield
- Richard Jenkins as Walter Wingfield
- John Rothman as Larry Falwell
- Jack Plotnick as Leon Pitofsky
- Eddie Cibrian as Jack Mitchelson
- Mark Pellegrino as Jimmy Mitchelson
- Henry Cho as Freddy
- Brent Hinkley as Streak
- Richard Riehle as Sheriff Merle Hobbs
- Brent Briscoe as Detective Vic Vetter
- Ezra Buzzington as Stewart
- Julie White as Ruthie Falwell
- Courtney Peldon as Cher Falwell
- Matthew Peters as Buddy Falwell
- Lin Shaye as Nurse Bautista
- C. Ernst Harth as Mr. Campisi
- Sarah Silverman as Officer Gina
- Suzanne Somers (uncredited) as Suzanne

== Release ==
Say It Isn't So opened in the United States on March 23, 2001, in 1,974 venues. It ranked number 10 at the North American box office, earning $2,861,903 in its opening weekend. At the end of its run, the film grossed $5,520,393 in the United States and $6,800,000 overseas for a worldwide total of $12,320,393.

== Reception ==
The film received overwhelmingly negative reviews from critics. On Rotten Tomatoes, it has an 8% approval rating based on 106 reviews, with an average score of 3.2/10. The website's consensus states: "Those that haven't tired of Farrelly brothers' brand of comedy may still find some laughs here. Otherwise, the slow pacing and unimaginative shock gags will start to wear on the viewer". On Metacritic, the film has a 21 out of 100 rating based on reviews from 29 critics, indicating "generally unfavorable reviews". Audiences polled by CinemaScore gave the film an average grade of "D+" on an A+ to F scale.

In his review for the Chicago Sun-Times, Roger Ebert gave the film one out of four stars and stated: "A comedy character can't be successfully embarrassed for more than a few seconds at a time. Even then, it's best if they don't know what they've done wrong--if the joke's on them, and they don't get it. [...] Say It Isn't So, on the other hand, keeps a character embarrassed in scene after scene, until he becomes an...embarrassment. The movie doesn't understand that embarrassment comes in a sudden painful flush of realization; drag it out, and it's not embarrassment anymore, but public humiliation, which is a different condition, and not funny". Writing for The Washington Post, Desson Howe noted that "When the Farrelly Brothers made Dumb and Dumber, There's Something About Mary and Me, Myself & Irene, the message was: Comedy doesn't get lower than this. They were wrong. [...] This time, the jokes about dead animals, gunk in the hair, incest and all other taboos are flatter than the road kill Gilly finds himself picking up for a living". Marc Savlov of The Austin Chronicle gave the movie one out of five stars, criticizing Rogers for using the "skeletal framework" of a Farrelly Brothers film that's bereft of their "good-natured" moments and humor that didn't "go not far enough and, ironically, way too far", concluding that: "In the end it's a dull, unremarkable comedy of errata; it makes you realize just how smart the creators of Dumb & Dumber actually are". Rolling Stone's Peter Travers felt the script was "minus a shred of Farrelly wit." Entertainment Weekly's Owen Gleiberman gave the film an overall "F" grade. He called it "a black comedy in the form of vicarious serial punishment", criticizing the use of "synthetic mock cruelties" that lack pacing and creativity when delivered as jokes, highlighting the main incest gag as failing to register due to the two main leads' performances.

=== Home media ===
Say It Isn't So was released on VHS and DVD on August 21, 2001. The DVD features an audio commentary by director Rogers and star Klein, and six deleted and extended scenes including an extended ending.
