= J. B. Rogers =

American film director and producer

- Born: James B. Rogers; Indianapolis, Indiana, U.S.
- Education: Park Tudor School
- Occupations: Film director; producer
- Known for: American Pie 2

James B. Rogers is an American film director and producer. He was born in Indianapolis, Indiana, where he attended Park Tudor School.

Rogers acted as second unit director for American Pie and later was the main director of American Pie 2. The film was a box office success and won a few awards at the Teen Choice Awards and the 2002 MTV Movie Awards. Later he directed films including Demoted, The Pool Boys, and Say It Isn't So. He acted as producer on Me, Myself & Irene, There's Something About Mary, Hall Pass, and a handful of other films.

Rogers also was a second unit director of over 30 films and worked with the Farrelly Brothers.
