= Susan Zelinsky =

American musician and performer

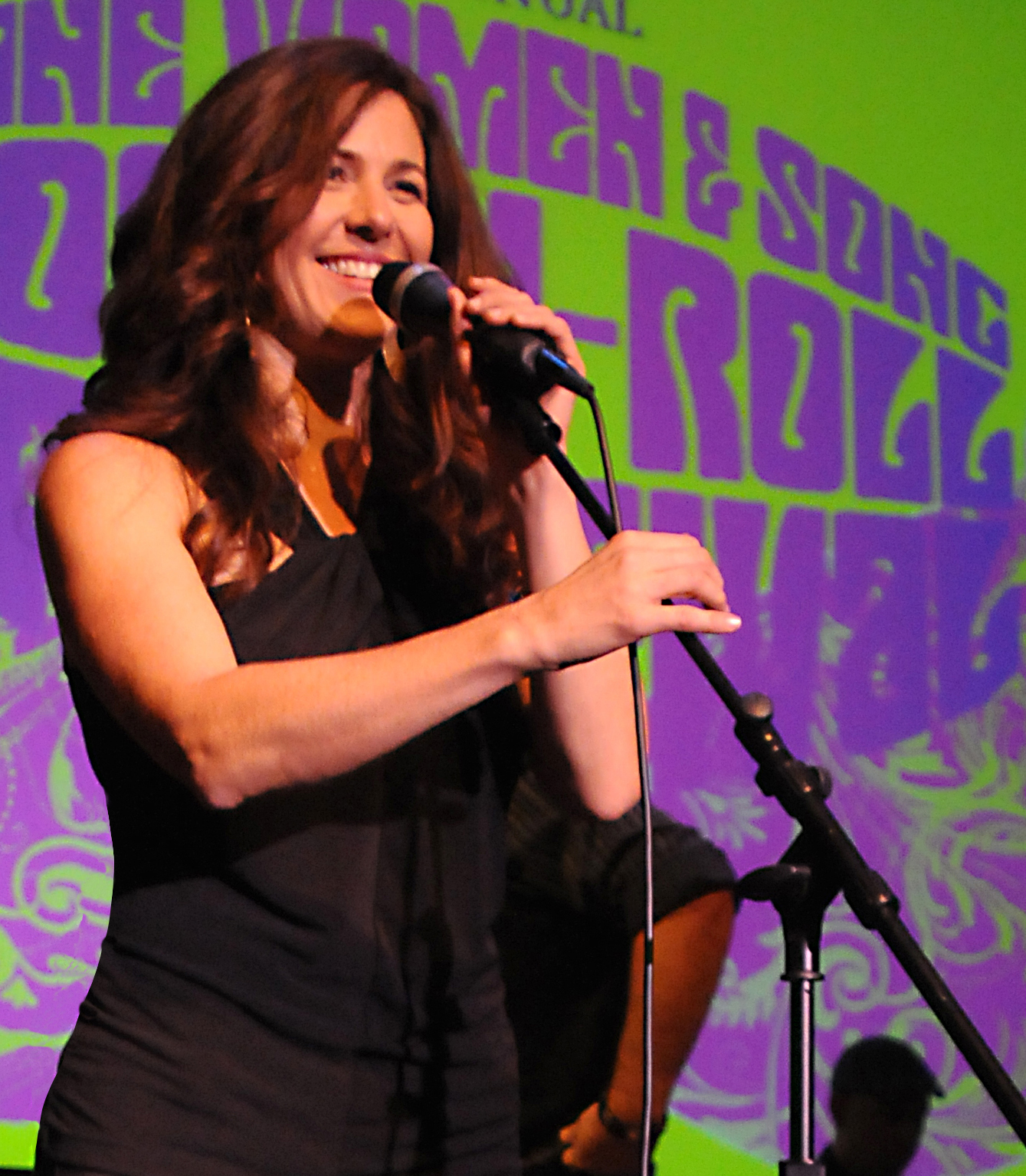
- Zelinsky at Wine, Women, & Song, 2013
- Born: August 28, 1967 (age 58); San Francisco, California, United States
- Other name: Susan Z
- Occupations: Singer-songwriter; Musician; Music Teacher; Actress; Musical Theater Director; Humanitarian
- Spouse: Michael Jobe (m. 2001)
- Children: 2
- Musical career
- Genres: Pop; rock
- Instruments: Vocals; Piano; Guitar
- Years active: 1985–present
- Website: susanz.com

Susan Zelinsky is an American singer, songwriter, musician, actress, musical theater director, and humanitarian born to parents Michael and Linda (née Anderson) Zelinsky in San Francisco, California. She has performed and recorded with such recording artists as Eric Martin, Eddie Money, Pablo Cruise, Jeff Watson, The Doobie Brothers, Vicki Randle, Joel Jaffe, Penny Framstad, Noelle Hampton, The Rowans, and more.

== Early life ==
Zelinsky split her time growing up with her father in San Francisco, California and with her mother in Carpinteria, California. She began playing the piano and writing songs at the age of nine. Her father gave her a guitar when she was thirteen and she taught herself to play. She attended The American Conservatory Theater, (ACT) Young Conservatory in San Francisco, California as well as studying acting at Jean Shelton Actor's Lab at Shelton Studios.

She studied Shakespeare and theater at The College of Marin and was a recipient of The Robin Williams Scholarship Award.

== Acting career ==
Zelinsky began acting professionally since 1987 and has been featured in national television commercials, TV series, and films. She is also an award-winning musical theater actress and singer.

=== Film and television ===
- 2015 - Mermaids on Mars (Short) Mother
- 2010 - Background (Short) Cafe Owner
- 2001 - Sweet November (2001 film) Waitress
- 1997 - Nash Bridges Waitress
- 1977 - Moving Target (1997) ... Waitress
- 1988 - Chivalrous Deeds of a Nincompoop

== Musical Theater ==
Zelinksy has performed in lead roles as a singer and actress in such musical productions as Hairspray, The Sound Of Music, Steel Magnolias, and West Side Story amongst others in the San Francisco Bay Area in California. She has performed in ten musicals at The Mountain Play Theater, an outdoor amphitheater on Mount Tamalpais in Marin County, playing the lead role of Tanya in 2018 to a sold-out audience (seating 4,000) for four consecutive nights.

=== Theater Credits ===
- 2019 - Spamalot - Lady of the Lake - Marin Shakespeare Company
- 2018 - Mamma Mia (musical) - Tanya - Mountain Play Association - Marin County
- 2015 - Into The Woods - as Wicked Step Mother and Cinderella's Mother - Theater at Large Novato
- 2015 - Peter Pan (musical) - as Mrs. Darling - Ruby daughter/lost boy - Mountain Play Association - Marin County
- 2013 - Steel Magnolias (play) - as M'Lynn - Novato Theater Company
- 2013 - The Sound of Music - Elsa von Schraeder - Mountain Play Association - Marin County
- 2012 - The Music Man (musical) - Marian - Mountain Play Association - Marin County
- 2011 - Hairspray (musical) - Velma Von Tussle - Mountain Play Association - Marin County
- 2010 - Guys and Dolls (musical) - Sarah - Mountain Play Association - Marin County
- 2007 - Beauty and the Beast (musical) - as Belle - Independent Artists of Marin (IAM) - San Alselmo Playhouse
- 2007 - Hair (musical) - Sheila - Mountain Play Association - Marin County
- 2004 - My Fair Lady (musical) - Eliza Doolittle - Mountain Play Association - Marin County
- 2000 - A Funny Thing Happened on the Way to the Forum - as Philia - Mountain Play Association - Marin County
- 1999 - West Side Story (musical) - Maria - Mountain Play Association, Marin County
- 1997 - 1998 The Birds (play) - as Prokne - and band member for the birds - Berkeley repertory theater and south coast repertory orange county (5 month tour) Oct. - 2
- 1989 - Brigadoon (musical)- Ensemble - Mountain Play Association - Marin County
- 1985 - A Christmas Carol (play) - as Mrs. Christmas Past - American Conservatory theater (ACG) San Francisco - The Geary Theater

=== Musical Theater Awards ===
- 2013 - SFBATCC Award - Best Actress in a Play (M’lynn/Steel Magnolias/Novato Theater Company)
- 2004 - San Francisco Bay Area Theater Critics Circle Award (SFBATCC) - Best Actress in a Musical (Eliza/My Fair Lady/The Mountain Play)
- 1998 - SFBATCC Nominee - Best Actress in a Musical (Maria/West Side Story/The Mountain Play)
- 1998 - Dean Goodman Choice Award (Bay Area) - Best Actress in a Musical (Maria/West Side Story/The Mountain Play)

== Music career ==
Zelinksy began performing professionally in 1994 under the band name, Susan Z. She performed regionally from the Marin Bay Area to Southern California and has released two albums, Believe in 1999 and Cautionary Tales in 2004. Her music, Justin Jones was featured in Hi Line in 1997 and California was featured in Nash Bridges in 1999.

=== Music In Video Games ===
- 2014 - Preston Castle (performer: "Your Revenge") / (writer: "Your Revenge")
- 2008 - The Sims: Bustin' Out (Video Game) Female Voice Talent (voice, as Susan Zelinski)
- 2007 - Karaoke Revolution Presents: American Idol (video game) (performer: "Straight Up")
- 2005 - Karaoke Revolution Party (Video Game) (performer: "(I've Had) The Time Of My Life", "Call Me", "Fly", "Material Girl", "Pieces Of Me", "That's Amore", "Time After Time")
- 2004 - Karaoke Revolution Volume 3 (Video Game) (performer: "Come Clean", "Love Shack", "Oops!... I Did It Again", "Take My Breath Away", "Thank You", "Why Can't I")
- 2004 - Karaoke Revolution Volume 2 (Video Game) (performer: "...Baby One More Time", "Cry", "Hot Stuff", "I'm With You", "It's My Life", "Papa Don't Preach", "The First Cut Is The Deepest", "Toxic", "We Are Family", "White Flag")
- 2003 - Karaoke Revolution (Video Game) (performer: "All You Wanted", "Are You Happy Now?", "Believe", "Complicated", "Don't Know Why", "Girls Just Want To Have Fun", "Kiss Me", "Like A Virgin", "Waiting For Tonight", "When A Man Loves A Woman")
- 2003 - SimCity 4: Rush Hour (Video Game) (voice, as Susan Zelinski)
- 2001 - Star Wars Episode I: Battle for Naboo (Video Game) Adela Tyché / Female Farmer / Naboo Citizen (voice)
- 2013 - Skiing Fran (Mobile/iOS) Fran Foofaraw (voice, as Susan Zelinski)

== Her Life Now ==
Zelinsky now teaches a drama class at the San Rafeal Community Center, San Rafeal with kids ages 7-12.She is currently directing a play for the Wizard of Oz.

== Wine, Women, & Song ==
Wine, Women & Song® is an annual benefit concert which raises money for the fight against breast cancer, founded by Susan Zelinsky, in 1998. As of 2018, over $350,000 has been raised and given to local charities: To Celebrate Life Breast Cancer Foundation and ZERO Breast Cancer of Marin.
