= Mike Wilkins =

English footballer

Personal information
- Full name: Michael John Wilkins
- Date of birth: 5 June 1942 (age 84)
- Place of birth: Leeds, England
- Position: Centre forward

Youth career
- Ashley Road Methodists

Senior career*
Years	Team	Apps	(Gls)
1959–1960	Bradford City	1	(0)
- Canterbury City
- * Club domestic league appearances and goals

Michael John Wilkins (born 6 May 1942) is an English former professional footballer who played as a centre forward.

== Career ==
Born in Leeds, Wilkins signed for Bradford City from Ashley Road Methodists in March 1959. He made 1 league appearance for the club, before being released in 1960. He later played for Canterbury City.

== Sources ==
- Frost, Terry (1988). Bradford City A Complete Record 1903-1988. Breedon Books Sport. ISBN 0-907969-38-0.
