= Mummy an' the Armadillo =

- US DVD cover
- Directed by: J.S. Cardone
- Screenplay by: J.S. Cardone
- Produced by: Carol Kottenbrook; Scott Einbinder
- Starring: Betty Buckley; Lori Heuring; Clare Kramer; Busy Philipps; Brad Renfro; Johnathon Schaech
- Cinematography: Kurt Brabbee
- Edited by: Amanda I. Kirpaul
- Production companies: Sandstorm Entertainment; First Light Films; Motor Pictures; Valencia Entertainment
- Distributed by: Sandstorm Films
- Release date: January 29, 2004
- Running time: 101 minutes
- Country: United States
- Language: English

Mummy an' the Armadillo (also known as The Scare Hole) is an American independent psychological thriller film directed by J.S. Cardone and adapted from his 1980s stage play of the same name. The film stars Clare Kramer, Lori Heuring, Betty Buckley, Brad Renfro, Busy Philipps and Johnathon Schaech, and unfolds almost entirely within a single roadside diner in the Arizona desert.

Set over the course of one stormy night, the story follows a young woman who becomes trapped inside the isolated Armadillo Café and entangled with a deeply dysfunctional family guarding long-buried secrets.

The film had its world premiere at the sixth annual Sarasota Film Festival in 2004 and was later released on DVD in 2005. Upon release, it received mixed reviews from critics, who frequently commented on its theatrical style and confined setting, while several performances, particularly those of Kramer, Buckley, and Renfro, were noted positively.

== Plot ==
On a stormy night in the Arizona desert, a young woman named Sarah stops at the isolated Armadillo Café, a rundown roadside diner filled with unusual displays, including a preserved "mummy" and various stuffed animals. She is greeted by Billie, who runs the café. As the night progresses, it becomes clear that both women are hiding secrets. After Billie briefly leaves the diner, Sarah finds herself trapped inside with Billie's dysfunctional family.

The family is led by Let, a volatile and alcoholic matriarch, along with her sons Wyatte, who is protective and intellectually limited, and Jesse, whose increasingly menacing behavior escalates the tension. Suspecting Sarah of threatening a long-buried family secret, they bind and interrogate her inside the café. As the confrontation intensifies over the course of the night, hidden motives and personal histories are gradually revealed, shifting the balance of power and exposing the truth behind Sarah's arrival.

== Cast ==
- Let - Betty Buckley
- Billie - Lori Heuring
- Sarah - Clare Kramer
- Carol Ann - Busy Philipps
- Wyatte - Brad Renfro
- Jesse - Johnathon Schaech
- Jackie - Jodi Lyn O'Keefe
- Temple - Wade Williams
- Bevers - Amanda-Lee Aday

== Production and release ==
The Mummy an' the Armadillo was adapted from a play of J.S. Cardone, which was originally done in the '80s. According to the director, although he had long been encouraged to bring it to the screen, "the right opportunity never presented itself until now". The film was shot entirely within the confines of a roadside diner set in Arizona. The film is a drama which takes place in one location over a period of six hours showing a very intense character dissection of a family's intricacies and their relationships.

Betty Buckley stated that she accepted the role in part because her brother, film editor Norman Buckley, had previously worked with J.S. Cardone on The Forsaken (2001). "I liked the film that my brother had done with Joe. I think he has a lot of style", she said, adding, "I couldn't quite figure this script out, but I threw it all to the winds and just did it". Buckley also compared the film's tone to "a 1950s theatrical kitchen drama", describing it as "like Tennessee Williams".

The film had its world premiere at the sixth annual Sarasota Film Festival, held in Florida from January 23 to February 1, where it was presented as part of the festival's lineup of 80 films, including nine world premieres. The DVD was released on August 9, 2005.

== Reception ==
David Nirsair of Reel Film Reviews described the movie as "initially intriguing but ultimately interminable", arguing that it "suffers from an almost unbearably stagy vibe", with an "exceedingly thin narrative and stilted, thoroughly self-conscious dialogue". He added that the film "eschews anything even resembling a plot in favor of a relentless cavalcade of quirky, colorful supporting characters", and criticized its "distinctly over-the-top vibe", though he noted that "Kramer and Heuring are admittedly far more effective than the film deserves". Rob O'Hara of Review-O-Matic described the movie as "not as much horror as it is psychological thriller and I use the word thriller loosely", criticizing its "so-called plot twists" as obvious and calling it "hopelessly" stagey, with "the majority of the film" set "in one room". While saying it "isn't a bad film, but it does misrepresent itself", he concluded he "wouldn't go out of my way to see this film, but I wouldn't go out of my way to avoid it either", adding, "if you're looking for a mummy movie or an armadillo movie, forget it".

Joe Leydon of Variety called The Mummy an' the Armadillo "eclectic to a fault" and "an ungainly mix" of disparate influences, ultimately deeming it "hopelessly stage-bound and transparently contrived". He noted, however, that director J.S. Cardone "gets generally fine performances from cast of seasoned vets and up-and-comers", singling out Busy Philipps as "a hoot", Brad Renfro for "deftly underplaying" his role, and praising the contributions of the supporting cast for stealing scenes.

AllMovie rated the film one and a half stars out of five. Neon Maniac of Horror DNA praised both the film and the DVD, calling the first "a straight ahead thriller that never lets up" and "a Grade A thriller with a character driven storyline that would make Hitchcock jealous". He commended J.S. Cardone for adapting the play effectively and highlighted the "talented group of actors", singling out Clare Kramer, who "does a great job maintaining and then upping her fright factor". While criticizing the video transfer of the DVD, which "leaves much to be desired", he lauded the "rich 5.1 DD soundtrack" as "one of the best mixes I've heard, regardless of budget". He graded the work as follows: Movie – 4 Stars; Video – 2.5 Stars; Audio – 4 Stars; Features – 3 Stars; Overall – 3.5 Stars.

=== Accolades ===
Award	Category	Nominee(s)	Result	Ref.
Breckenridge Festival of Film (2004)	Best Ensemble Cast	Mummy an' the Armadillo	Won	
