= J. S. Cardone =

American film director

J.S. Cardone
- Born: Joseph S. Cardone; October 19, 1946 (age 79); Pasadena, California, U.S.
- Occupations: Film director; producer; screenwriter

Joseph S. Cardone (born October 19, 1946 in Pasadena, California) is an American film director, producer and writer. He wrote and directed the films The Slayer, Shadowzone and The Forsaken and wrote The Covenant.

== Filmography ==
Film

Year	Title	Director	Writer	Executive Producer
1982	The Slayer	Yes	Yes	No
1985	Thunder Alley	Yes	Yes	No
1990	Shadowzone	Yes	Yes	No
1990	Crash and Burn	No	Yes	No
1991	A Climate for Killing	Yes	Yes	No
1993	Shadowhunter	Yes	Yes	No
1995	Black Day Blue Night	Yes	Yes	No
1996	Exit in Red	No	Story	Yes
1998	Outside Ozona	Yes	Yes	No
2001	The Forsaken	Yes	Yes	No
2001	True Blue	Yes	Yes	Uncredited
2003	Alien Hunter	No	Yes	Yes
2004	Mummy an' the Armadillo	Yes	Yes	No
2005	Vampires: The Turning	No	No	Yes
2006	The Covenant	No	Yes	Yes
2006	Wicked Little Things	Yes	No	Producer
2008	Prom Night	No	Yes	Yes
2009	The Stepfather	No	Yes	Yes

Direct-to-video

Year	Title	Director	Writer	Executive Producer
2002	Sniper 2	No	No	Yes
2004	Sniper 3	No	Yes	Yes
2005	The Marksman	No	Yes	Yes
2005	8mm 2	Yes	No	Yes
2011	Sniper: Reloaded	No	No	Yes
