= I Remember You (2015 film) =

- Directed by: Claudia Sparrow
- Written by: Claudia Sparrow
- Produced by: Leandro Marini; James Cotten; Bradley Smith; Valentina Bove
- Starring: Stefanie Butler; Joe Egender; Scott Cushman; Malin Yhr; Steve Wilcox
- Cinematography: Kristoffer Carrillo
- Edited by: Matteo Marchisano-Adamo
- Music by: Mauricio Yazigi
- Production companies: Local Hero; Dark Highway Films
- Release date: July 22, 2015 (Downtown Film Festival)
- Running time: 86 minutes
- Country: United States
- Language: English

I Remember You is a 2015 American romantic drama film written and directed by Claudia Sparrow. It stars Stefanie Butler and Joe Egender as two people who come to believe they are destined to fall in love. It premiered at the Downtown Film Festival on July 22, 2015, and was released theatrically on November 13, 2015.

== Plot ==
After Leah, a scientist, saves the life of Samuel, an actor, their lives change dramatically. Samuel comes to believe that they have always been destined to fall in love and eventually convinces Leah of his metaphysical ideas.

== Cast ==
- Stefanie Butler as Leah
- Joe Egender as Samuel
- Scott Cushman
- Malin Yhr
- Steve Wilcox

== Production ==
The budget was less than $500,000. It is the first film to be produced by Local Hero.

== Release ==
I Remember You premiered at the Downtown Film Festival in Los Angeles, California, on July 22, 2015. It was theatrically released on November 13, 2015.

== Reception ==
Michael Nordine of The Village Voice wrote that Sparrow "zigs where you expect her to zag (not always in the best of ways)", but the film's predictable ending is still satisfying. Martin Tsai of the Los Angeles Times wrote that it is difficult to accept that Butler's character, a scientist, would accept the film's metaphysical themes. Tsai states that the film almost fails the Bechdel test.
