= Heather Stephens =

American actress

- Born: United States
- Years active: 1994–2014

Heather Stephens is a former American actress. She starred on ABC's The Forgotten as Lindsey Drake alongside Christian Slater.

== Filmography ==
=== Film ===
Year	Title	Role	Notes
1996	The Disappearance of Kevin Johnson	Rhonda	
1996	Dead of Night	Ruby Dell	
1997	Lost Highway	Lanie	
1997	Dante's Peak	Hot Springs Woman	
1998	Baywatch: White Thunder at Glacier Bay	Leslie Stryker / Clair Hodges	Direct to video
1998	With Friends Like These...	Babette	
1998	Tina Gets Her Man	Tina	Short film
1999	Clubland	Sophie	
1999	Blue Ridge Fall	Carrie Cotswold	
2000	The In Crowd	Tanya	
2001	Tomcats	Jill	
2009	Messengers 2: The Scarecrow	Mary Rollins	Direct to video
2010	My Girlfriend's Boyfriend	Sarah Reed	
2010	Father vs. Son	Darlene Pickett	
2012	The Frankenstein Theory	Vicky Stephens	

=== Television ===
Year	Title	Role	Notes
1995	The Watcher	Lisa	"Fathers and Sons"
1997	Beverly Hills, 90210	Katie	"With This Ring"
1997	Boston Commons	Christy	"To Bare Is Human"
1997	Steel Chariots	Josie	TV film
1998	Forever Love	Emma	TV film
2000	Angel	Shari	"She"
2001–2002	Men, Women & Dogs	Michelle	Regular role
2002	Do Over	Abby Suffin	"Hot for Teacher"
2002	Without a Trace	Lindsay Randall	"In Extremis"
2004–2005	Desperate Housewives	Kendra Taylor	"Anything You Can Do", "Sunday in the Park with George"
2005	Las Vegas	Chrissy Potter	"Hit Me!"
2005	CSI: Crime Scene Investigation	Karen Matthews	"Still Life"
2006	Saved	Dr. Karen Thorpe	"Code Zero", "Tango", "Crossroads"
2006	CSI: Miami	Danielle Madison	"Curse of the Coffin"
2006	Our Thirties	Alice	TV short
2008	Moonlight	Emma Monaghan	"Sonata"
2008	Man of Your Dreams	Catherine	TV film
2009–2010	The Forgotten	Lindsey Drake	12
2011	House	Denise Harris	"The Confession"
2012	NCIS	Lorraine	"Extreme Prejudice"
2014	Reckless	Mindy Hope	"Stand Your Ground"
