= The Slayer (film) =

1982 American horror film by J. S. Cardone

- Theatrical poster
- Directed by: J. S. Cardone
- Written by: J.S. Cardone; William R. Ewing
- Produced by: William R. Ewing; Eric Weston; Anne Kimmel
- Starring: Sarah Kendall; Frederick Flynn; Carol Kottenbrook; Alan McRae
- Cinematography: Karen Grossman
- Edited by: M. Edward Salier
- Music by: Robert Folk
- Production company: International Picture Show Company
- Distributed by: 21st Century Film Corporation
- Release date: October 1, 1982
- Running time: 80 minutes 86 minutes (uncut)
- Country: United States
- Language: English
- Budget: ^{c.} $750,000

The Slayer (also known as Nightmare Island) is a 1982 American independent supernatural horror film directed by J. S. Cardone. Set on a small island near the Atlantic coast, the plot concerns two couples who upon visiting the island get trapped there due to an oncoming hurricane. As one of the women knows from her plaguing nightmares that the island is dangerous, over the next three days they begin to be killed by something unseen. The film is notable for gaining notoriety and being classified in the United Kingdom as a "video nasty" in the 1980s.

== Plot ==
Kay is an abstract visual artist plagued by disturbing dreams since childhood. The intensity and frequency of the dreams have fluctuated throughout her life, as has their content; some of her dreams are simply glimpses of desolate locations that leave her feeling dread upon awakening, while others feature the gruesome deaths of her friends and loved ones at the hands of a supernatural force. Recently, her dreams have become more frequent and disturbing than ever, leading to a decline in the quality of her work. Afraid that the dreams are aggravated by stress and depression and fearful that her newfound success may be slipping away, Kay's family and friends plan a vacation for her to a small island off the coast of Georgia. Accompanying Kay are her husband, David; Kay's brother, Eric, who introduced her to David; and Eric's wife, Brooke.

As the couple's plane prepares to land, their pilot, Marsh, informs them that he's just received notification that an Atlantic hurricane has shifted course towards the island. Marsh hurriedly drops the couple off, telling them he must leave the island before he's stranded there. The couple discovers that, against expectations, the island is deserted - all that's left of a once-thriving resort town are its derelict buildings. Kay informs the rest of the quartet that the island is the place she has been dreaming about since childhood and that they are all in danger if they stay. But unable to leave due to the hurricane, the others try to assuage her fears.

The following evening, an unseen assailant murders David and Kay dreams of waking up next to his severed head. That day, she finds David's decapitated body hanging in an abandoned playhouse on the island. Eric believes that Marsh never left the island and brought the couples there to kill them, a supposition that is granted some support when Marsh is later seen on the island. Kay believes that the island has allowed her dreams to cross over into reality and that the creature from her nightmares is responsible, a theory supported by the fact that the deaths only occur when Kay is asleep. During the night, Eric tells Brooke that Kay was given a black kitten for Christmas as a young girl but it was found frozen to death in the family freezer two days later. Kay blames the creature in her nightmares for the cat's death.

As night falls, Eric goes to retrieve flares from a boathouse and is murdered on the beach before being dragged into the ocean. Later, Brooke is attacked in the boathouse and impaled with a pitchfork. After finding their bodies on the beach, Kay barricades herself in the beach house and struggles to stay awake, incessantly drinking coffee and smoking cigarettes to remain stimulated. In the middle of the night, Marsh attempts to enter the house. Kay shoots him with a flare gun, killing him and setting the house on fire. In the chaos, Kay discovers a flaming, skeletal creature waiting at the front door as she tries to flee.

As the grotesque creature approaches her, Kay (as a child) is woken on Christmas morning by her parents, who tell her she had a nightmare. As Eric enters the room, Kay's father then presents her with a black kitten. Kay looks at the cat and becomes visibly frightened as she realises that the nightmare she had wasn't just a bad dream but a premonition of things to come.

== Cast ==
- Sarah Kendall as Kay
- Frederick Flynn as Eric
- Carol Kottenbrook as Brooke
- Alan McRae as David
- Michael Holmes as Marsh
- Paul Gandolfo as Fisherman
- Newell Alexander as Kay's Father
- Ivy Jones as Kay's Mother
- Richard Van Brakel as Eric (as a child)
- Jennifer Gaffin as Kay (as a child)
- Carl Kraines as The Slayer

== Analysis ==
The Slayer has received critical attention from film scholars and horror film enthusiasts for its ambiguous sensibility, with parts of its narrative told out of chronological order, allowing for multiple mutually exclusive interpretations supported by various elements of the script. The core events of the film which occur on the island have been noted by critics for their dubious nature, as they can alternately be interpreted in three ways: The events which take place are entirely part of a dream or premonition; a monstrous creature in fact exists on the island and is responsible for each of the murders; or the characters of Kay or Marsh are responsible for the killings. However, the script does not resolve this fundamental issue; instead, it refers back to itself. Additionally, each character foreshadows his or her own death in dialogue in the film's first act.

== Production ==
In 1981, writer-director J.S. Cardone was working at a liquor store in L.A. while attempting to break into the film business, and pitched the idea for The Slayer to producer William R. Ewing. The International Picture Company, an independent film studio based in Atlanta, agreed to help produce the project on a budget of approximately $750,000.

As a result of the studio's basis in Georgia, the crew scouted areas in the state to shoot the film, settling in Tybee Island, east of Savannah. Upon arriving at the island—which at that time was largely uninhabited and dilapidated—Cardone recalled it fit perfectly with the vision he had had for the film while writing the script. Filming took place in the winter of 1982 on Tybee Island with additional photography in Savannah.

== Release ==
After the film's production company, The International Picture Show Company, went bankrupt, the film was acquired by 21st Century Film Corporation for distribution. It was subsequently given a brief theatrical release in October 1982, showing in NYC in an edited rough cut that had not been color-corrected. This print of the film would later be used for VHS releases in the mid-1980s.

=== Critical reception ===
Allmovie wrote "The Slayer boasts some effectively eerie atmosphere and a dark, downbeat attitude. Unfortunately, sluggish pacing eliminates the tension that might have been established between the minimal cast and the sinister deserted-island setting." Gordon Bowker of Variety deemed The Slayer a "boring horror film for hit-and-run bookings." In his 1989 video guide The Horror Film: A Guide to More Than 700 Films on Videocassette, James Mulay notes: "Director J.S. Cardone manages to present this overly familiar material with considerable flair, considering his low budget, and the film does have a genuinely surreal, nightmarish quality."

Film historian Adam Rockoff praised the film's special effects and called it a "straightforward, sophisticated, and unexpectedly well-acted film." Film historian John Wiley Martin called the film "a pretty modest, sub-Repulsion exercise in escalating alienation from the point of view of a troubled young woman." Scholars David Kerekes and David Slater praised the film's opening sequence and noted elements of German Expressionism present in the film, but added that the latter portion of the film paled in comparison to its opening act.

=== Home media ===
The Slayer was released in the USA on double feature video format by Continental Video alongside another feature: Scalps. It was cut by about five minutes to make room for the second feature, but all the gruesome scenes and violence are intact.

In the UK, the film was initially released uncut on pre-cert VHS format in 1983. However, it was subsequently seized and banned by the BBFC and placed on the infamous "video nasty" list in October 1983 in the jurisdiction of the then-upcoming Video Recordings Act 1984, which stated that all video content must carry a classification for home video releases. Films that contained extreme or excessive violence, gore, or sex had to be edited to fit the 18 classification or banned outright. The Slayer was removed from the list in April 1985.

The film received a 14-second cut version by the BBFC when it was picked up by the now-defunct Vipco for VHS distribution and released on March 1, 1992. This VHS would later become a collectible after going out of print, with an average resale price of $75 in 1996. On August 13, 2001, Vipco released the film, uncut, on both VHS and DVD, as part of their "Vaults of Horror" collection. On October 13, 2003, Vipco again released the same uncut version on DVD-only format for their "Vipco's Screamtime Collection" which contained newly commissioned artwork that differed from all previous releases. Although the company was popular, it was also criticized for stating that their DVD releases were digitally remastered, when in fact they were simply VHS transfer prints, which unfortunately led The Slayer to remain in its cropped 4:3 aspect ratio. Vipco's company dissolved in 2007, and distribution rights were later held by the defunct Cornerstone Media for a brief time under their subsidiary Beyond Terror, releasing the film on DVD on February 15, 2010. However, Cornerstone Media made the film available only with updated artwork; the disc itself is from Vipco's Screamtime Collection release, which is something the company did with all titles they picked up from Vipco. The inserted discs were perhaps Vipco's unsold or refurbished copies.

Arrow Films released the film on dual format Blu-ray and DVD in the UK on August 21, 2017, and in the USA on August 29, 2017. The set contains a 4K transfer of the film and is available for the first time in its original aspect ratio of 1.85:1, and contains English Mono uncompressed PCM audio and English subtitles for hard-of-hearing. It includes several interviews with cast and crew members as well as three audio commentaries.

== See also ==
- Exploitation film
- Horror-of-personality
- Slasher film
- Street art

== Sources ==
- Albright, Brian (2012). Regional Horror Films, 1958-1990: A State-by-State Guide with Interviews. McFarland. ISBN 978-0-786-47227-7.
- Curtis, Tony (1996). Lyle Film and Rock 'n' Roll Collectibles. Berkley Publishing Group. ISBN 978-0-399-52205-5.
- Kerekes, David; Slater, David (2000). See No Evil: Banned Films and Video Controversy (2nd ed.). Headpress. ISBN 978-1-900-48610-1.
- Kerswell, Justin, et al. (2017). The Slayer. Audio commentary (Blu-ray). Arrow Films.
- Martin, John Wiley (2007). Seduction of the Gullible: The Truth Behind the Video Nasty Scandal. Stray Cat. ISBN 978-0-953-32618-1.
- Mulay, James J. (1989). The Horror Film: A Guide to More Than 700 Films on Videocassette. CineBooks. ISBN 978-0-933-99723-3.
- Rockoff, Adam (2016). Going to Pieces: The Rise and Fall of the Slasher Film, 1978–1986. McFarland. ISBN 978-0-786-49192-6.
