= The Forsaken (2001 film) =

2001 film by J. S. Cardone

- Theaterial release poster
- Directed by: J. S. Cardoen
- Written by: J. S. Cardone
- Produced by: Scott Einbinder; Carol Kottenbrook
- Starring: Kerr Smith; Brendan Fehr; Izabella Miko; Phina Oruche; Simon Rex; Carrie Snodgress; Johnathon Schaech
- Cinematography: Steven Bernstein
- Edited by: Norman Buckley
- Music by: Tim Jones; Johnny Lee Schell
- Production company: Screen Gems
- Distributed by: Sony Pictures Releasing
- Release date: April 27, 2001
- Running time: 90 minutes
- Country: United States
- Language: English
- Budget: $15 million
- Box office: $8,704,851

The Forsaken is a 2001 American horror film written and directed by J. S. Cardone and distributed by Screen Gems. The film stars Kerr Smith, Brendan Fehr, Izabella Miko, and Jonathan Schaech. Conceived as a road movie with vampire hunters, the story follows a young film trailer editor on a cross-country business trip through the Arizona desert who picks up a shady hitchhiker and along the way encounters a disoriented young woman who's being stalked by a vampire cult.

== Plot ==
Aspiring filmmaker Sean is working as a freelance driver to make ends meet. He is assigned to deliver an expensive Mercedes-Benz from Los Angeles all the way to its owner in Miami, which will also allow him to attend the wedding of his sister. He's given strict instructions not to damage the vehicle or pick up any hitchhikers.

Sean is driving cross country when he picks up Nick, a hitchhiker who happens to be a vampire hunter hunting a group of vampires led by one of the Forsaken- the first vampires. They originated as a group of knights who made a pact with the fallen angel Abaddon to live forever by drinking the blood of one their comrades. Two of the Forsaken are located in the United States (including the one Nick is tracking, Kit). Nick was bitten and infected by a vampire but, thanks to an antiviral drug cocktail, the vampire virus is being kept at bay. Each of the Forsaken carry a unique strain of vampirism; killing a Forsaken kills his entire bloodline and reverses the condition of individuals who haven't fully turned. Nick believes that if he kills Kit, he will be cured before he turns (as the drug cocktail eventually will lose effect). At first Sean is less than willing to indulge his new acquaintance; however, he is convinced after the two come across a disoriented young woman, Megan, at a diner, who was bitten by the vampires and left for dead. Nick also proves he is telling the truth by killing a vampire, Teddy, with exposure to sunlight.

Sean and Nick take Megan to their motel room, but she goes into a rage and bites Sean; they realize they must kill the Forsaken responsible to prevent Sean from turning. Forsaken can only be slain on hallowed ground, so the three head for a Spanish mission 60 miles away. They stop at a gas station where an old woman, Ina, lets them in. She shows them a newspaper connecting Megan to a bloodbath in Arizona; when Megan wakes up and is coherent enough to talk, she explains she was a victim of the vampires' bloodbath. Kit catches up to them and lays siege to the gas station.

Sean discovers a graveyard outside and Ina explains that it is an old Spanish graveyard that was never dug up, making the house hallowed ground and thus a suitable place to kill Kit. In the ensuing battle, Sean and Nick are injured. As Kit is about to kill Ina and Megan, Sean drives his car through the gas station wall and pins Kit to the wall, hoping to hold him there until the sun rises. Kit pushes the car, Sean shoots him, knocking him into a beam of sunlight. As Kit starts to combust, Sean, Nick, Megan, and Ina flee the gas station; Kit's explosive death ignites the gas. Sean and Megan are finally cured of vampirism; however, Nick is not cured as it turns out that the vampire who bit him is descended from the other Forsaken in the United States. Nick takes to the road to try to find and kill the other Forsaken, leaving a letter of thanks for Sean. Three months later, Sean catches up to him and insists on helping, having discovered that the Forsaken is probably in Colorado. The two set off for Denver.

== Cast ==
- Kerr Smith as Sean
- Brendan Fehr as Nick
- Izabella Miko as Megan
- Johnathon Schaech as Kit
- Phina Oruche as Cym
- Simon Rex as Pen
- Carrie Snodgress as Ina Hamm
- Alexis Thorpe as Teddy
- F. J. Flynn as Hoot
- Sara Downing as Julie

== Themes ==
Contemporary critics of the film have noted a homoerotic subtext between the film's two central male characters. In a 2013 retrospective on the film, the publication Culture Crossfire said of the film: "Twelve years later, there’s nothing about The Forsaken that’s particularly memorable other than the fact that it’s an in-denial coming out tale that just happens to have vampires." His Name is Death editor Albert Nowicki noted that the movie is full of phallic imagery and compared Schaech's villain to Chris Sarandon's vampiric character Jerry Dandrige from the 1985 horror comedy Fright Night. He believed that neither of the two main characters was sexually interested in Miko's Megan and that it is strongly indicated Sean and Nick develop romantic feelings towards each other.

== Production ==
Director J.S. Cardone was influenced by Terrence Malick's Badlands (1973) and Kathryn Bigelow's vampire film Near Dark (1987) when writing The Forsaken, and said he wanted to make a "road movie" with vampires. Kerr Smith was cast in the film based on his performance as Jack McPhee, a gay teenager on the network series Dawson's Creek; Brendan Fehr was cast based on his role in the sci-fi series Roswell. Cardone cast Izabella Miko in the role of Megan, who at the time was new to the film industry. To prepare for the role, Miko, who is originally from Poland, completed accent training in order to achieve an American accent.

The film was shot on location in and around Yuma, Arizona.

== Reception ==
The Forsaken holds a 9% approval rating on the internet review aggregator Rotten Tomatoes, based on 56 reviews with the site's consensus simply stating, "It's all been done before, and done better". Metacritic, which uses a weighted average, assigned the film a score of 35 out of 100, based on 12 critics, indicating "generally unfavorable" reviews. Audiences polled by CinemaScore gave the film an average grade of "D" on an A+ to F scale.

Marc Savlov of The Austin Chronicle said of the film: "Like the recent Dracula 2000, The Forsaken supplies its own twist, and also like that other film it comes as less of a surprise than a bewilderment. I'll refrain from spelling it out, though I'll note that the Crusades have something to do with it and it handily doubles as an AIDS metaphor. Who'da thunk it?" Entertainment Weekly also gave the film a negative review, calling it "startlingly amateurish."

Stephen Holden of The New York Times gave a middling review of the film, calling it a "reasonably smart generic hybrid," but that it "trots out its full arsenal of shock tactics far too early in the game and squanders the suspense it has accumulated." Wesley Morris of the San Francisco Chronicle wrote: "As anonymous vampire flicks go, The Forsaken is like a store-bought costume with plastic fangs collecting dust in a Wal-Mart "Everything Must Go" bin. Imagine a tributary of Dawson's Creek snaking into the cesspool area of the Styx, and you might be able to glean a vision of The Forsaken for yourself."

Maitland McDonagh of TV Guide called the film a "hip, revisionist horror picture, which borrows liberally — and cannily — from Near Dark and The Hitcher." Neil Smith of the BBC awarded the film three out of five stars, but noted that the film "plays down the more lurid aspects of the vampire legend—no fangs, crucifixes or silver bullets—in an attempt to free the genre from its gothic roots. The problem is he inadvertently removes everything that makes the horror genre fun."

=== Box office ===
The film opened at #8 at the North American box office making $3,020,159 USD in its opening weekend. The film lost money by 53 percent in box office earnings the following week causing the film to move a notch down to #9. It became a box office bomb as the film had plummeted to the 15th spot.
