= Davyd Whaley =

American painter

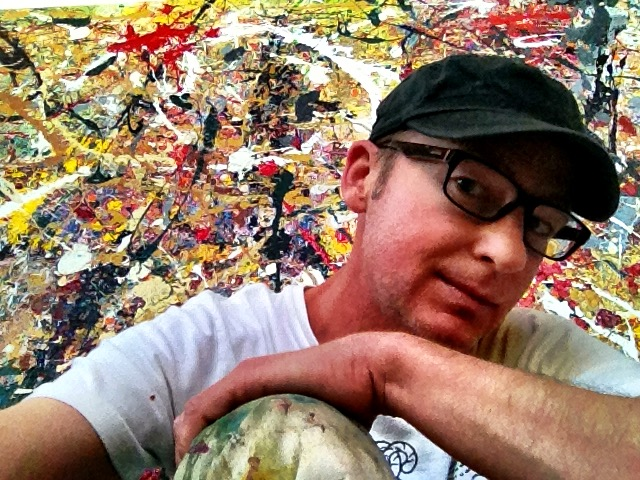
- Whaley with his painting "Come Back to Me"
- Born: December 6, 1967; Bristol, Tennessee, U.S.
- Died: October 15, 2014 (aged 46); Los Angeles, California, U.S.
- Known for: Abstract paintings with Jungian themes
- Spouse: Norman Buckley (m. 2008)
- Website: davydwhaley.com

Davyd Whaley (December 6, 1967 – October 15, 2014) was an American abstract painter known for expressing in his paintings Jungian themes related to the world of the subconscious.

== Biography ==
Davyd Whaley was born in Bristol, Tennessee, in 1967. He was a Los Angeles-based painter. He was a United States Navy Veteran of four years. Previous to his career as a painter, he was an electrical engineer for twenty years. He met television director Norman Buckley in 2004, and they were married (as soon as they were legally able) from 2008 until Whaley's death on October 15, 2014, in Los Angeles.

== Painter ==
Whaley was primarily self-taught, but he also studied painting at the Art Students League of New York from 2008 to 2011, working with mentors Ronnie Landfield and Larry Poons. His painting style is known for using brilliant colors and for its Jungian themes, reflecting his interest in dream analysis and in the world of the subconscious.

His work appeared on numerous television shows, including CSI: Crime Scene Investigation, Californication and Pretty Little Liars.

He later moved his studio out of his home and into the Santa Fe Art Colony in downtown Los Angeles.

== Foundation ==
In 2016, The Davyd Whaley Foundation was established by Whaley's husband Norman Buckley to honor Whaley's legacy of service, through the awarding of grants to artists to follow their own creative paths. Whaley was a philanthropist. He taught art to the underprivileged, counseled grieving families in hospitals, and taught terminally-ill and war-scarred children to paint. He was honored as volunteer of the year by Los Angeles County Board of Supervisors in 2012. Davyd's goals were always evident: make art; buy the art of others; help people whenever possible; grow in consciousness. The mission of the foundation was designed around these tenets.

== Monograph ==
A monograph of Davyd Whaley's work was published in 2016 with an essay called "A Hero's Journey" by Peter Clothier.

== Exhibitions ==
- Galerie Michael, Beverly Hills, California, "Davyd Whaley", February 2013
- UCLA Design & Arts It's Your Show, Award of Distinction, "Heaven & Hell", May 2013
- Aqua Art Miami, Miami Beach, Florida, Galerie Michael, "Davyd Whaley", December 3, 2013 – December 8, 2013
- Florence Biennale, Florence, Italy, "Revelations", November 30, 2013 – December 8, 2013
- Galerie Michael, Beverly Hills, California, "Davyd Whaley: Subconscious Tendencies", February 2014
