= Tim Jones (film composer) =

American composer and musician

Timothy Stuart Jones is an American composer and musician. Jones has composed scores for film and television.

Jones is perhaps best known as the composer for five seasons (91 episodes) of Chuck on NBC. Jones also took over scoring duties on season 2 of Human Target on Fox.

Tim Jones, who majored in film scoring, graduated in 1994 with a bachelor's degree from the Berklee College of Music in Boston.

His TV work brought him to the attention of Mark Mothersbaugh. Working with Mark led to Jones doing additional music for portions of the Marvel film, Thor: Ragnarok. He also provided additional score for Lego Movie 2, Holmes and Watson and most recently Mitchell’s vs.The Machines and Hotel Transylvania: Transformania. Because of Jones’ work with Mothersbaugh on Thor: Ragnarok, Marvel asked him to be a part of the music team on Captain Marvel. He also was brought in by Janusz Kaminski to compose additional score for his film, American Dream.

Jones has also completed films with several new directors. Lin Oeding, (Office Uprising and Braven); Jesper Ganslandt, (Beast of Burden and Snabba Cash), and Joel David Moore, (Hide and Seek). Jones also has a long relationship with Dir/Prod Mike Elliot for whom he has written four scores: American Pie Presents: Girls’ Rules, Smoking Aces: Assassins' Ball, Secrets of Emily Blair and Santa Girl.

In 2021, being credited as Timothy Stuart Jones, He worked with director James Cullen Bressack on the Bruce Willis films, Survive the Game and Fortress. Jones also scored the documentary film Waterman, directed by Isaac Halasima, about the legendary figure Duke Kahanamoku. This film will premiere on PBS in Spring 2022.

== Filmography ==
- Hot Seat
- Hide and Seek
- Survive The Game
- Waterman
- American Pie Presents: Girls' Rules
- Santa Girl
- Office Uprising
- Beast of Burden
- Abolitionists
- Cult
- Human Target
- Chuck
- Smokin' Aces 2: Assassins' Ball
- The Death and Life of Bobby Z
- Wicked Little Things
- 8mm 2
- Karla
- Sniper 3
- Vampires: The Turning
- Alien Hunter
- True Blue
- Duel
- The Forsaken
- The Sculptress
- Manna from Heaven
- A Dark Foe
- Darkness of Man
