= The Forgotten (TV series) =

- Genre: Crime drama
- Created by: Mark Friedman
- Starring: Christian Slater; Michelle Borth; Rochelle Aytes; Heather Stephens; Anthony Carrigan; Bob Stephenson; Elisha Cuthbert
- Composer: Graeme Revell
- Country of origin: United States
- Original language: English
- No. of seasons: 1
- No. of episodes: 17 + unaired pilot

Production
- Executive producers: Jerry Bruckheimer; Jonathan Littman
- Production locations: Chicago; Los Angeles
- Running time: 60 minutes
- Production companies: Jerry Bruckheimer Television; Bonanza Productions; Warner Bros. Television

Original release
- Network: ABC
- Release: September 22, 2009 – July 3, 2010

The Forgotten is an American crime drama television series which premiered on September 22, 2009 on ABC. On November 9, 2009, ABC ordered five additional episodes of the series, bringing the first season's total to eighteen episodes. The final two episodes of The Forgotten aired on July 3, 2010.

The Forgotten was rated R16 in New Zealand for graphic violence and sex scenes.

== Premise ==
A group of dedicated, amateur detectives, the members of the Forgotten Network (referred to in the pilot as the Identity Network), attempt to reconstruct the pieces of these John and Jane Does' lives from what little evidence is left behind. Each episode is narrated by a "body" who watches the team as they pursue the tantalizingly difficult challenge of figuring out who this victim once was. Why would anyone volunteer for such a grim task? As new recruit Tyler Davies quickly discovers, each of the members of the team has his or her own reasons for volunteering for the Network. Alex Donovan is a former cop, whose then eight-year-old daughter was kidnapped two years ago and has never been found. Lindsey Drake, the woman who runs the network from her home, is a virtual recluse whose husband is a convicted murderer. Walter Bailey does stake outs—when he is not blowing his cover. Candace Butler hates her day job. She also happens to have a special gift for putting people at ease—even the prickly Tyler, a talented sculptor with a background in forensics, a medical school drop-out, who initially joined the team to fulfill a sentence of 200 hours of community service after being apprehended defacing buildings.

== Cast ==
The Forgotten intertitle

- Christian Slater as Alex Donovan
- Heather Stephens as Lindsey Drake (episodes 1–13)
- Michelle Borth as Candace Butler
- Anthony Carrigan as Tyler Davies
- Bob Stephenson as Walter Bailey
- Rochelle Aytes as Grace Russell
- Elisha Cuthbert as Maxine Denver (episodes 12–17)

== Episodes ==
In addition to the 17 regular episodes produced with the cast listed, an "Original Pilot" was previously filmed with different actors in some of the roles. Rupert Penry-Jones played Alex Donovan, and Reiko Aylesworth played Linda Manning (replaced by Heather Stephens as Lindsey Drake).

=== Pilot ===
Title	Directed by	Written by	Original release date
Unaired pilot	Danny Cannon	Mark Friedman	Unaired
Same plot as the aired pilot, but with Rupert Penry-Jones as Alex Donovan, and Reiko Aylesworth as Linda Manning (replaced by Heather Stephens as Lindsey Drake in the aired pilot episode).

=== Season 1 (2009–10) ===
No.	Title	Directed by	Written by	Original release date	Prod. code	US viewers (millions)
1	"Pilot"	Danny Cannon	Mark Friedman	September 22, 2009	2J5091	9.53
Volunteer members of the Forgotten Network, Alex Donovan, Candace Butler, Lindsey Drake, Walter Bailey, Tyler Davies and Det. Grace Russell, work together to solve the case of "Highway Jane," who had been murdered and her body dumped in the woods. Note: This is the series premiere.
2	"Diamond Jane"	Jeffrey Hunt	Lukas Reiter	September 29, 2009	2J5051	7.52
The Forgotten Network takes the case of a Jane Doe who was found strangled and dumped in an alley six weeks previously. The only link to the investigation is an engagement ring.
3	"Football John"	Holly Dale	Seamus Kevin Fahey & David Slack	October 6, 2009	2J5053	7.81
The Forgotten Team investigates a case of a former football player who had been beaten to death and left in an alley. One clue is a key found in his pocket.
4	"Parachute Jane"	Paul McCrane	Holly Harold & Marqui Jackson	October 13, 2009	2J5052	7.58
The Forgotten Network investigates a Jane Doe who apparently died from an insulin overdose, but the team suspects foul play.
5	"River John"	Oz Scott	Marqui Jackson & Mark Friedman	October 20, 2009	2J5055	7.62
The Forgotten Network investigates the case of a John Doe who had been shot in a drainage tunnel. Alex's search for his own missing daughter is mirrored in the life of the victim as the team uncovers an evil plot that involves betrayal, kidnapping, and murder.
6	"Canine John"	Bill Eagles	Stephen Gallagher	October 27, 2009	2J5054	8.56
The Forgotten Network investigates the murder of a man who had been found buried at a local vacation spot. The only clue to his death is a stray dog who stands vigil over his owner's grave.
7	"Railroad Jane"	Deran Sarafian	David Slack	November 3, 2009	2J5056	7.27
When a female skull is discovered near a railroad track, the Forgotten Network learns Jane Doe's only remaining relative, her comatose sister, could also be in danger.
8	"Prisoner Jane"	Nathan Hope	Rick Eid	November 17, 2009	2J5057	7.69
The Forgotten Network takes the case of a Jane Doe found strangled in a warehouse. The investigation leads the team to man who might have been falsely imprisoned for her murder.
9	"Lucky John"	Tucker Gates	Lukas Reiter	December 1, 2009	2J5058	5.46
Four months after a man is found dead in the trunk of a car, a DNA test identifies the man as an ex-con who died years ago.
10	"Double Doe"	Karen Gaviola	Debra J. Fisher	January 5, 2010	2J5059	4.38
Walter brings The Forgotten Network their first case involving multiple victims, a male and female Doe shot to death and buried in the snow outside a sleazy motel. The age difference and the large amount of cash found on them suggest something nefarious.
11	"Patient John"	Guy Ferland	Stephen Gallagher	January 12, 2010	2J5060	4.32
A John Doe found murdered and stuffed inside a seepage pit takes the team into the world of medical trials.
12	"My John"	Deran Sarafian	Seamus Kevin Fahey & Mark Friedman	February 9, 2010	2J5062	5.92
When a young man falls to his death from the top a skyscraper, the Forgotten Network takes on the near impossible task of identifying him. Also Maxine Denver joins the Forgotten Network because she has a little bit to do with the John Doe.
13	"Mama Jane"	Dermott Downs	Rick Eid & Marqui Jackson	February 16, 2010	2J5061	4.97
A woman is found dead in a strip club bathroom, which leads the Forgotten Network to find out what the one thing was that the Jane Doe wanted.
14	"Train Jane"	Jeffrey Hunt	David Slack	February 23, 2010	2J5063	5.02
A woman is found unidentified in a train wreck but a passenger said she survived because she helped him get out the train, so the Forgotten Network works to find out what really happened to the Jane Doe
15	"Donovan Doe"	Christopher Misiano	Marqui Jackson & Mark Friedman	March 9, 2010	2J5066	4.85
The remains of a female child are found and Russell believes that these bones may be tied to the disappearance of Alex's daughter, Lucy. She asks for the Forgotten Network's help in identifying the remains and finding answers about the girl's disappearance.
16	"Designer Jane"	Felix Alcala	Debra J. Fisher & Holly Harold	July 3, 2010	2J5064	2.68
When a young woman is killed outside a local charity event, Lydia (Aisha Tyler), an old friend of Alex's, asks the Forgotten Network to help identify the unknown woman.
17	"Living Doe"	Guy Ferland	Corey Miller	July 3, 2010	2J5065	3.06
After waking up from a coma, a young man comes to the Forgotten Network in order to find out his name. The team links the man's past to a violent lifestyle which almost costs them one of their own. Note: This is the series finale.

== International broadcasting ==
Country	Channel	First aired
Finland	MTV3	January 6, 2012
France	TF1	February 28, 2012
Greece	Star Channel	March 18, 2013
Hungary	RTL II	October 3, 2012
Italy	Joi	March 3, 2010
Lithuania	LNK	December 8, 2011
Netherlands	NET 5	December 9, 2011
Poland	TVN	February 23, 2010
Slovenia	Planet TV	November 1, 2013
Switzerland	RSI La 2 (in Italian)	September 18, 2011
