= Wicked Little Things =

- Theatrical release poster
- Directed by: J. S. Cardone
- Written by: Jace Anderson; Adam Gierasch; Ben Nedivi
- Story by: Boaz Davidson
- Produced by: J. S. Cardone; Boaz Davidson; Anton Hoeger; Danny Lerner; David Varod
- Starring: Lori Heuring; Scout Taylor-Compton; Chloë Grace Moretz; Geoffrey Lewis; Ben Cross
- Cinematography: Emil Topuzov
- Edited by: Alain Jakubowicz
- Music by: Tim Jones
- Production companies: Millennium Films; Höger Human Service Medien & Personal GmbH; Nu Image Films; Sandstorm Films
- Distributed by: Sony Pictures Entertainment
- Release date: November 17, 2006
- Running time: 94 minutes
- Country: United States
- Language: English

Wicked Little Things (also known as Zombies) is a 2006 American zombie horror film directed by J. S. Cardone and starring Lori Heuring, Scout Taylor-Compton and Chloë Grace Moretz. The film was claimed to be based on true events.

== Plot ==
In 1913, in Carlton, Pennsylvania, the wealthy owner of the Carlton Mine uses immigrant child laborers. To excavate a new shaft, a girl named Mary is sent into a tunnel with dynamite. The resulting explosion buries her and several other children in the mine.

80 years later, Karen Tunny and her daughters, Sarah and Emma, are moving to her husband's childhood home (which she inherited after his death) near the now-abandoned Carlton mine. They are advised by a local to avoid the woods, especially at night. While driving, Karen nearly hits a man crossing the road. She looks for the man, but finds what seems to be a broken jar of blood on the ground. They arrive at the house, and Sarah points out some blood on the door.

Karen finds old pictures of the child miners and news clippings about the accident. That night, she dreams that a child with a pickaxe enters the home and attacks her; when she wakes, she finds her door open with fresh blood on it, and sees a man crossing the property. The next day, a plumber arrives to fix the pipes, and he tells her that the children were from the mine. He is determined to leave their house before nightfall. Meanwhile, Emma hears children giggling and leaves the house to investigate. When Karen finds her, she is at the entrance to the old mine. They get lost on the way back and find a seemingly empty house. When they enter, they're confronted by Hanks, who admits to putting the blood on their doors and advises them to stay home after dark. He also tells them that William Carlton, the last surviving Carlton, is buying all of the property around the mine. On his way home, the plumber veers off the road to avoid the child miners and is subsequently killed by them.

Karen is disturbed by Emma's continued insistence that she met a new friend named Mary who lives in the mine. She even tells Karen that Mary has promised not to hurt her, but the other children might. Hanks ties up a pig outside the old Carlton mansion and sees the children watching him. When he leaves, they devour the pig. Karen is astonished to find Emma outside one day, holding an old, coal-blackened doll, which she claims came from Mary. Hearing voices, Karen wanders over to the old Carlton mansion, where she is confronted by William Carlton. He tells her she does not own the house, but rather that she has an illegal "miner's lease" that actually belongs to him. Karen later finds a photo of Mary showing the same doll Emma now has.

Sarah meets 3 other teenagers and begins hanging out with them. One night, they get spooked while parked in the woods, and one of the boys goes outside to investigate. When he doesn't return, the other boy goes out as well. They are subsequently attacked and killed by the children, with only Sarah escaping. When she returns home in a panic, she and Karen find that Emma is missing as well. They run to the mine and are confronted by all the children. While fleeing, they encounter William Carlton and try to get him to drive them to safety. The children arrive, however, and kill his driver. The three flee to Hanks' house.

Inside, Hanks tells them that the children spare blood relatives (Mary Tunny and her brother, as well as Hanks' ancestors, were among the children killed in the mine) but seek revenge on the Carlton bloodline. William tries unsuccessfully to shoot the children, but it does not stop them. The four try to flee, but Hanks' truck does not start, and they hide in the barn. William hides in the loft, and the children enter. They slowly bypass the Tunnys and Hanks and swarm William and murder him. Emma then emerges from the crowd of children, who allow Hanks and the Tunnys to leave.

Ultimately, the Tunnys decide to move, but do not sell the house (which somehow legally passed to them after William's death). Ostensibly, they allow the children to live in the house now that they have had revenge on the Carltons, and Mary and her brother are seen in the Tunny house.

== Cast ==
- Lori Heuring as Karen Tunny
- Scout Taylor-Compton as Sarah Tunny
- Chloë Grace Moretz as Emma Tunny
- Geoffrey Lewis as Harold Thompson
- Ben Cross as Aaron Hanks
- Martin McDougall as William Carlton
- Helia Grekova as Mary

== Production ==
At one point, Tobe Hooper was set to direct the film, but when he dropped out to direct 2005's Mortuary, J. S. Cardone stepped up to direct. The film was shot in the mountains of Bulgaria.

== Release ==
The film debuted as one of the eight films that make up the horror film festival 8 Films to Die For's first cycle in 2006.
