= David Beecroft =

American actor

- Occupation: Actor

David Beecroft is an American actor noted for his television appearances, having played both regular and recurring roles in series such as Falcon Crest (as Nick Agretti), Dr. Quinn, Medicine Woman and Melrose Place.

== Early life and education ==
Beecroft graduated from W. T. White High School in Dallas, Texas, in 1974. He graduated from Trinity University in San Antonio, Texas, before moving to Hollywood in 1979.

== Career ==
In 1992, he starred on the short-lived series Hearts are Wild. He has also been a regular on the daytime soap operas One Life to Live as Trent Chapin (1985–1986) and All My Children from 1999 to 2001. He played the serial killer in 1990's The Rain Killer, and a gigolo in 1987's Creepshow 2.

== Personal life ==
Beecroft's older brother is actor Gregory Beecroft.

== Filmography ==
=== Film ===
Year	Title	Role	Notes
1982	The Border	Kevin	
1987	Creepshow 2	Annie's lover	
1990	Shadowzone	Capt. Hickock	
1990	The Rain Killer	Dalton	
1998	Code of Ethics	Peter Van Leuvan	
2000	The Crimson Code	Garcia	
2000	The King's Guard	Sgt. Drummond	
2000	Octopus	Captain Jack Shaw	

=== Television ===
Year	Title	Role	Notes
1984	One Life to Live	Trent Chapin	1 episode
1988	Hunter	Clint Parker	2 episodes
1988	CBS Summer Playhouse	Bolan	Episode: "Silent Wisper"
1988–1989	Falcon Crest	Nick Agretti	20 episodes
1990	Matlock	Charlie Orbach	Episode: "The Narc"
1992	Hearts Are Wild	Jack Thorpe	9 episodes
1993	Class of '96	Prof. Jameson Howe	3 episodes
1993	Moon Over Miami	Jeremy Galvin	Episode: "My Old Flame"
1993	River of Rage: The Taking of Maggie Keene	Eric Houseman	Television film
1994	Walker, Texas Ranger	Alan Billbon	Episode: "Something in the Shadows: Part 2"
1994	The Counterfeit Contessa	Sinclair Everett	Television film
1994	One West Waikiki	Brad Sullivan	Episode: "Vanishing Act"
1994	Murder, She Wrote	Mark Atwater	Episode: "A Nest of Vipers"
1995	Melrose Place	Dr. Paul Graham	6 episodes
1995	The Awakening	Flynn	Television film
1996	Women: Stories of Passion	Victor	Episode: "Warm Hands, Cold Heart"
1996	Suddenly	Doug	Television film
1996	Promised Land	Don Hale	Episode: "King of the Road"
1997	Dr. Quinn, Medicine Woman	Sgt. Terence McKay	6 episodes
1998	Moonlight Becomes You	Liam Moore Payne	Television film
1999	Kidnapped in Paradise	Matt Palin	Television film
