= Betty Buckley =

American actress, singer (born 1947)

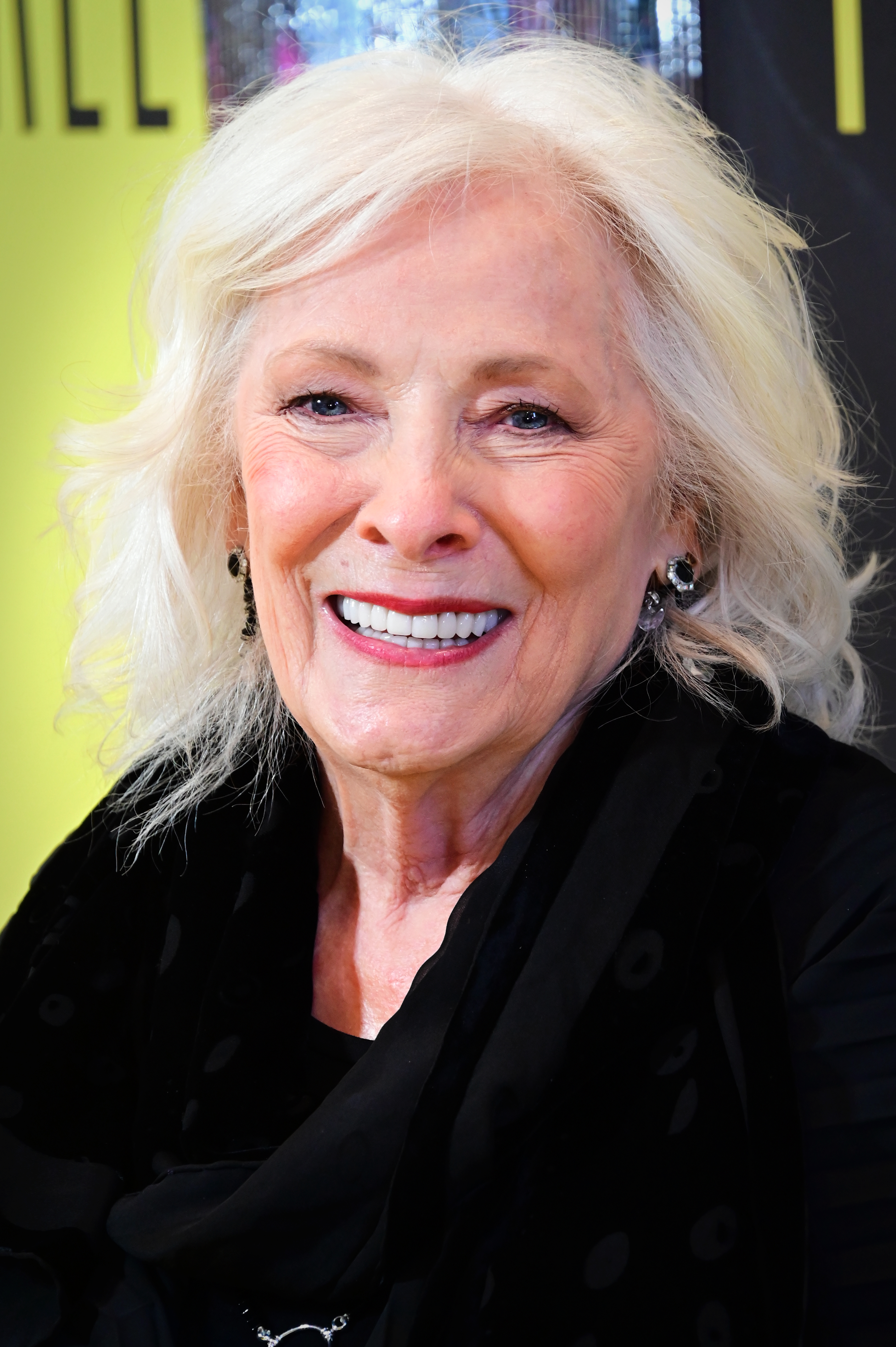
- Buckley in 2026
- Born: July 3, 1947 (age 79); Big Spring, Texas, U.S.
- Education: Texas Christian University
- Occupations: Actress, singer, music teacher
- Years active: 1964–present
- Spouse: Peter Flood (m. 1972; div. 1979)
- Relatives: Norman Buckley (brother)
- Website: www.bettybuckley.com

Betty Buckley (born July 3, 1947) is an American actress and singer. Buckley is the winner of a Tony Award, and was nominated for an additional Tony Award, two Daytime Emmy Awards, two Grammy Awards, and an Olivier Award. In 2012, she was inducted into the American Theater Hall of Fame.

Buckley won the 1983 Tony Award for Best Featured Actress in a Musical for her role as Grizabella in the original Broadway production of Cats and sang the character's signature song "Memory" at the 1983 Tony Awards broadcast on CBS television. She went on to play Norma Desmond in Sunset Boulevard (1994-96) in both London and New York, receiving a 1995 Olivier Award nomination for Best Actress in a Musical, and was nominated for the 1997 Tony Award for Best Actress in a Musical for Triumph of Love. Her other Broadway credits include 1776 (1969), Pippin (1973), and The Mystery of Edwin Drood (1985). From September 2018 to August 2019, she starred as the title role in the U.S. national tour of Hello, Dolly.

Buckley starred in the TV series Eight Is Enough from 1977 to 1981 and played gym teacher Miss Collins in the 1976 film Carrie, before going on to star in the short-lived Broadway musical version of Carrie in 1988, playing Carrie White's mother, Margaret. Her other film roles include Dixie Scott in Tender Mercies (1983), Sondra Walker in Frantic (1988), Kathy in Another Woman (1988) and Mrs. Jones in The Happening (2008). She received a Saturn Award nomination for her role as Dr. Karen Fletcher in the 2016 film Split. Her other television credits include series Oz (2001–03), and Preacher (2018).

== Early life and education ==
Betty Lynn Buckley was born on July 3, 1947, in Big Spring, Texas. At 11, she saw The Pajama Game at Fort Worth's Casa Mañana and decided to pursue musical theater. Her mother, a former tap dancer, supported this interest and took her to dance lessons without her father's knowledge; her father opposed a career in show business.

She attended Arlington Heights High School. Her first professional role was Dainty June in a production of Gypsy when she was 15. Buckley graduated from high school at 16 and enrolled at Texas Christian University at 17.

She won the Miss Fort Worth title in 1966 and placed as runner-up in the Miss Texas pageant. A producer for the Miss America pageant invited her to appear as a guest entertainer on the national telecast, where talent agents saw her perform and signed her before she finished her senior year. She worked as a reporter at the Fort Worth Press from 1967 to 1968. She earned a Bachelor of Arts in journalism from TCU in 1968. After graduating, she joined a USO tour to South Korea and Japan.

== Career ==
=== Film and television ===
Buckley is known for the 1977–81 TV dramedy Eight Is Enough. She joined the show in its second season when the original star, Diana Hyland, died after the first four episodes of season one, and her character Joan Bradford died as well. Buckley was cast as the widower's new romantic interest, Sandra Sue "Abby" Abbott, who became stepmother of the eight children to which the series' title refers.

Buckley appeared in the original movie version of Carrie in 1976, playing Miss Collins, Carrie's gym teacher. In 1977, she recorded an uncredited solo on the song "Walking in Space", in the movie Hair.

On television, she received two Daytime Emmy Award nominations for Outstanding Performer in a Children's Program/Special, for NBC Special Treat - Bobby and Sarah (1984) and ABC Afterschool Special - Taking a Stand (1989).

Her screen roles during the 1980s include Bruce Beresford's film Tender Mercies, where she played a country music singer and sang the Academy Award-nominated song "Over You". She also appeared in the Woody Allen film Another Woman (1988), Roman Polanski's Frantic (1988), Lawrence Kasden's Wyatt Earp (1994).

From 2001 to 2003, she played the role of Suzanne Fitzgerald in seasons 4-6 of the HBO series Oz.

She also has guest-starred in a number of television series, including Without a Trace, Law & Order: Special Victims Unit, and Monk. She guest-starred in a Christmas special of the TV series Remember WENN, created and written by Rupert Holmes for the cable channel American Movie Classics, in which she sang two Holmes original songs: "Christmas is Waiting" and "You Make It Christmas". She appeared as Marion Leckie, mother of Robert Leckie in the HBO series The Pacific, which aired in 2010.

Also in 2010, she appeared in the 18th episode of Melrose Place as a food critic cast by her brother Norman Buckley, who directed the episode. She also guest-starred in an episode of the Fox series The Chicago Code. She was a recurring guest star on Pretty Little Liars as Regina Marin, also directed by her brother Norman. In 2008, Buckley played Mrs. Jones in M. Night Shyamalan's The Happening. In 2017, Buckley was one of the stars of M. Night Shyamalan's Split, the number-one film at the box office for three weeks.

Her other television credits include guest-starring as Meg's mother in The Leftovers on November 30, 2015, appearing in five episodes of the 2017-2021 series Supergirl. Buckley was also cast in season three of the series Preacher in 2018.

=== Stage ===
Buckley made her Broadway debut in 1969 in the original production of the musical 1776; she has been called "The Voice of Broadway" by New York magazine.

In 1982, Buckley starred as Grizabella in the original Broadway production of the musical Cats, singing the show's signature number, "Memory". She stayed with the production for 18 months. For this role, she won a Tony Award for Best Featured Actress in a Musical.

In 1988, Buckley starred as Margaret White in Carrie: The Musical.

Buckley starred in both London (1994) and New York (1995) as Norma Desmond in the musical Sunset Boulevard. For her role in the London production, she received an Olivier Award nomination for Best Actress in a Musical.

In 1997, she starred as Hesione in the Broadway musical Triumph of Love and received a Tony Award nomination for Best Actress in a Musical.

Buckley sang "Memory" from Cats at the Kennedy Center Honors in December 2006 as part of the tribute to Andrew Lloyd Webber. In 2007, Buckley appeared with Quintessence at Lincoln Center in its Great American Songbook series.

Buckley participated in a reading of the musical Ruthless! in September 2010, playing the role of Sylvia St. Croix/Ruth DelMarco. She then played Mrs. White in the off-Broadway comedy White's Lies from March to May 2010. In 2011, Buckley starred in the Dallas Theater Center production of Arsenic and Old Lace by Joseph Kesselring with Tovah Feldshuh.

On January 28, 2013, she was inducted into The American Theater Hall of Fame. From January to March 2013, she starred in the London Premiere of Jerry Herman's Dear World. The musical was directed and choreographed by Gillian Lynne, with whom Buckley had previously worked on Cats.

In September 2013, she starred in the world premiere of Horton Foote's The Old Friends at the Signature Theatre off-Broadway. She repeated her performance in 2014 at Houston's Alley Theatre.

In May 2015, it was announced that Buckley would appear as Big Edie in the musical, Grey Gardens at Bay Street Theater in Sag Harbor, NY. The production ran August 4 to 30, 2015. She reprised the role from July 13 to August 14, 2016 at the Ahmanson Theatre in Los Angeles.

On February 12, 2018, it was announced that Buckley would portray the title role in the first national tour of the 2017 Broadway revival of Hello, Dolly!, beginning performances in October 2018 in the Connor Palace at Cleveland's Playhouse Square. Buckley dedicated the January 15, 2019 performance in San Diego to Carol Channing following her death. Buckley finished her leg of the tour in September 2019 and prepared concerts scheduled in early 2020 at the Cafe Carlyle in NYC and other venues.

=== Music ===
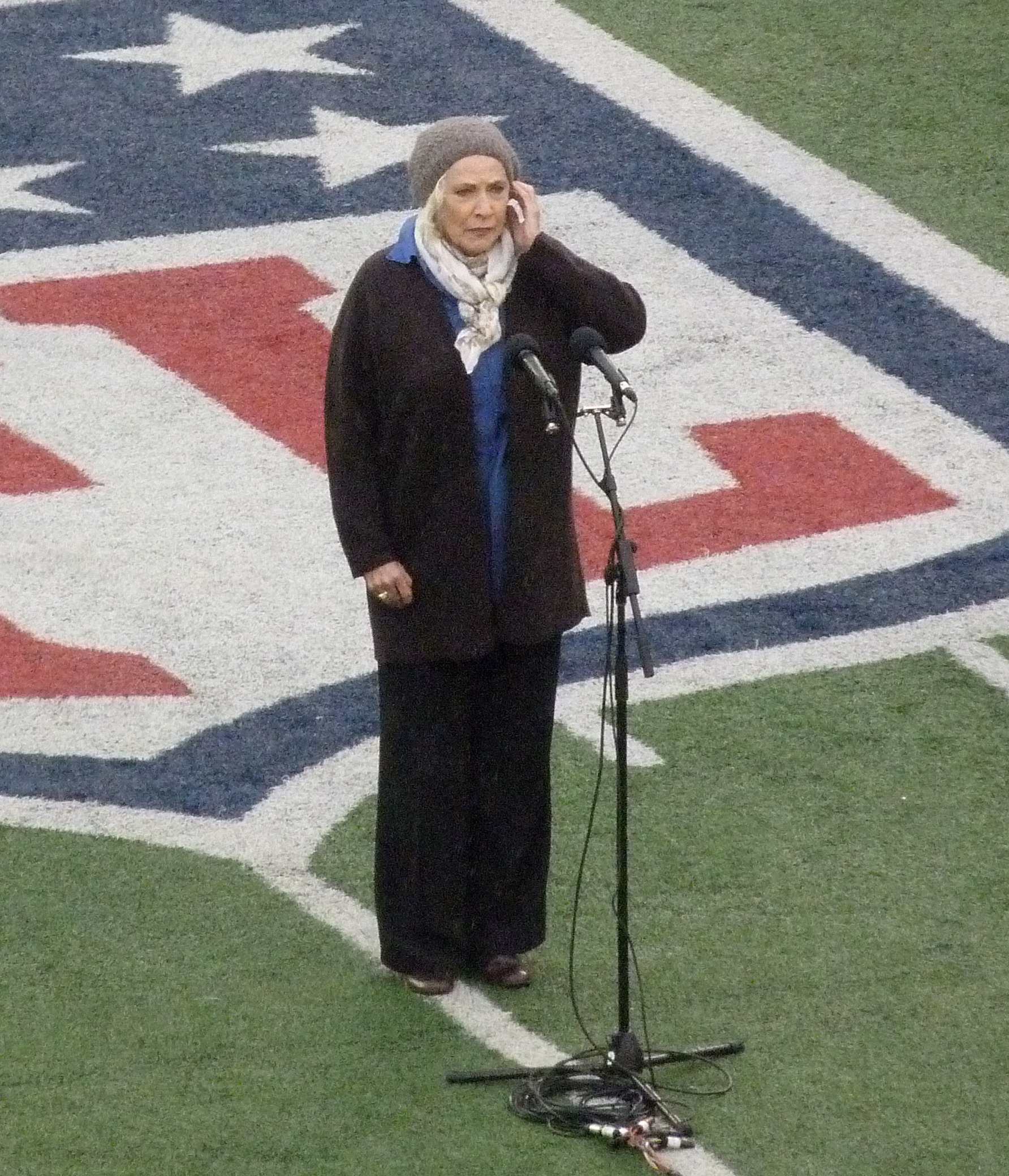
Buckley singing the National Anthem at MetLife Stadium, in 2012

Hope, Buckley's 18th solo album, was released on June 8, 2018, and she continues to appear in concert across the U.S. each year. She is also a composer; her first recording contains mostly songs she wrote. She is also featured on many Broadway compilation recordings, and on the original cast recording of 1776; the original Broadway recording of Cats; the London recording of Promises, Promises; Triumph of Love and The Mystery of Edwin Drood.

In 2002, Buckley was nominated for a Grammy Award in the Best Traditional Pop Vocal Album Category, for her album Stars and the Moon: Live at the Donmar, which was recorded at the Donmar Warehouse Theatre in London. This was her second Grammy nomination; she had previously been nominated in 2000, in the Best Spoken Word Album category for The Diaries of Adam and Eve.

Her albums Quintessence and 1967 were released by Playbill Records in February 2008. Quintessence features jazz arrangements of standards by her former collaborator, jazz pianist Kenny Werner; while 1967 is a recording produced by T-Bone Burnett, and made when Buckley was just 19.

Her album Bootleg: Boardmixes From the Road was released in 2010, and her recording of her hit show at Feinstein's at the Regency with pianist/collaborator Christian Jacob, titled Ah, Men: The Boys of Broadway debuted on August 28, 2012.

Her album Ghostlight was produced by the T Bone Burnett and was released on September 16, 2014.

== Personal life ==
Buckley was married to Peter Flood in 1972, divorced in 1979, and has no children.

She has received two honorary doctorates for her contributions to musical theater—one from The Boston Conservatory and the other from Marymount Manhattan College.

== Filmography ==
Film
Year	Title	Role	Notes
1976	Carrie	Miss Collins	
1983	Tender Mercies	Dixie	
1987	Wild Thing	Leah	
1988	Frantic	Sondra Walker	
1988	Another Woman	Kathy	
1992	Rain Without Thunder	Beverly Goldring	
1994	Last Time Out	Maxine Black	
1994	Wyatt Earp	Virginia Earp	
1995	Ride for Your Life		Short film
1998	Of Love & Fantasy	Dr. Tania Brandt	Video
1999	Simply Irresistible	Aunt Stella	
2002	New World Order	Rose Kross	
2004	Mummy an' the Armadillo	Let	
2008	The Happening	Mrs. Jones	
2011	5 Time Champion	Fran	
2016	Split	Dr. Karen Fletcher	
2024	Imaginary	Gloria	
2025	By Design	Cynthia	
2025	Eternity	old Joan Culter	

Television
Year	Title	Role	Notes
1977	Ryan's Hope	Divorced Lady	Episode: "1.405"
1977	The Rubber Gun Squad	Rosie	TV movie
1977–1981	Eight Is Enough	Sandra Sue 'Abby' Abbott Bradford	102 episodes
1981	The Ordeal of Bill Carney	Barbara Slaner	TV movie
1984	Special Treat	Mrs. Lawson	Episode: "Bobby and Sarah"
1984	The Three Wishes of Billy Grier	Nancy Grier	TV movie
1985	Evergreen	Mrs. Bradford	TV miniseries
1987	Roses Are for the Rich	Ella	TV movie
1987	Cagney & Lacey	Marci Bruckman	Episode: "You've Come a Long Way, Baby"
1989	ABC Afterschool Specials	Lillian Robinson	Episode: "Taking a Stand"
1989	Babycakes	Wanda	TV movie
1991	L.A. Law	Elisa Chandler	2 episodes: "Something Old, Something Nude" and "TV or Not TV"
1992	Mathnet	Sally Storm	Episode: "The Case of the Mystery Weekend"
1992	Bonnie & Clyde: The True Story	Mrs. Parker	TV movie
1992	Square One TV	Sally Storm	3 episodes
1993	Tribeca	Ruth	Episode: "The Rainmaker"
1994	Betrayal of Trust	Dr. Jan Galanti	TV movie
1996	Critical Choices	Dr. Margaret Ludlow	TV movie
1996	Remember WENN	Gloria Redmond	Episode: "Christmas in the Airwaves"
2001–2003	Oz	Suzanne Fitzgerald	18 episodes
2003	Monk	Mrs. Fleming	Episode: "Mr. Monk Goes to the Theater"
2004	The Jury	Carla Kohler	Episode: "Last Rites"
2005	Vinegar Hill	Mary Margaret Grier	TV movie
2006	Brothers & Sisters	Iva March	Episode: "Unaired Pilot"
2006	Without a Trace	Catherine Ryder	Episode: "Expectations"
2006 and 2008	Law & Order: Special Victims Unit	Attorney Walsh	3 episodes: "Manipulated", "Clock", "Lunacy"
2010	Melrose Place	Bernadette Reese	Episode: "Sepulveda"
2010	The Pacific	Marion Leckie	Episode: "Home"
2011	The Chicago Code	Sister Paul	Episode: "Hog Butcher"
2011	Pretty Little Liars	Regina Marin	Episode: "I Must Confess"
2013	Pretty Little Liars	Regina Marin	Episode: "She's Better Now"
2014	Getting On	Dottie Levy	Episode: "Is Soap A Hazardous Substance?"
2015	The Leftovers	Jane	Episode: "Ten Thirteen"
2016	Chicago Med	Olga Barlow	Episode: "Extreme Measures"
2017–2020	Supergirl	Patricia Arias	4 episodes
2018	Preacher	Madame Marie L'Angelle	Season 3
2021	Supergirl	Owl (voice)	Episode: "Dream Weaver"
2021–2022	Law & Order: Special Victims Unit	Trial Division Chief Lorraine Maxwell	Recurring role (seasons 23-24)

Theatre
Year	Title	Role	Notes
1969	1776	Martha Jefferson	46th Street Theatre
1969	Promises, Promises	Fran Kubelik	Prince of Wales Theatre
1972	What's A Nice Girl Like You Doing in a State Like This		Off-broadway
1973	Pippin	Catherine (replacement)	Imperial Theatre
1980–1981	I'm Getting My Act Together and Taking it on the Road	Heather	Circle in the Square Theatre Downtown; Huntington Hartford Theatre, Los Angeles
1982–1984	Cats	Grizabella	Winter Garden Theatre
1985	Song and Dance	Emma (replacement)	Royale Theatre
1985	Drood	Edwin Drood / Miss Alice Nutting	Shakespeare in the Park; Imperial Theatre
1985	Juno's Swans		Second Stage Theatre
1988	Carrie	Margaret White	Virginia Theatre
1992	The Threepenny Opera	Jenny Diver	Williamstown Theatre Festival
1992	Gypsy	Mama Rose	Arizona Civic Light Opera
1993	The Fourth Wall		Chicago Opera Theatre
1994–1996	Sunset Boulevard	Norma Desmond (replacement)	Adelphi Theatre; Minskoff Theatre
1997	Triumph of Love	Hesione	Royale Theatre
1998	Gypsy	Mama Rose	Paper Mill Playhouse
1998	Camino Real		Hartford Stage
2003	Elegies: A Song Cycle		Lincoln Center
2003	The Threepenny Opera	Jenny Diver	Williamstown Theatre Festival
2010	White's Lies	Mrs. White	New World Stages
2011	Arsenic and Old Lace	Martha Brewster	Dallas Theater Center
2013	Dear World	Countess Aurelia	Charing Cross Theatre, London
2013–2014	The Old Friends	Gertrude	Pershing Square Signature Center; Alley Theatre, Houston
2015	Follies	Carlotta Campion	Royal Albert Hall, London
2015–2016	Grey Gardens	Big Edie	Bay Street Theater, Sag Harbour, New York; Ahmanson Theatre, Los Angeles
2018–2019	Hello, Dolly!	Dolly Gallagher Levi	National Tour

== Discography ==
Albums
Name	Year	Label	Notes
Betty Buckley	1985	Rizzoli	
Children Will Listen	1993	Sterling	
With One Look	1994	Sterling	
New Ways to Dream – Songs from Sunset Boulevard	1994	Really Useful	
The London Concert	1995	Sterling	Recorded March 19, 1995
An Evening at Carnegie Hall	1996	Sterling	Recorded June 10, 1996
Betty Buckley's Broadway	1996	Sterling	Compilation album
Much More	1997	Sterling	
Betty Buckley (15 Year Anniversary Re-Release)	2000	KO	
Heart to Heart	2000	KO	
The Doorway	2001	Fynsworth Alley	
Stars and the Moon – Live at the Donmar	2001	Concord	Recorded August 31 and September 1, 2000
1967	2007	Playbill	Recorded in 1967, released 40 years later
Quintessence	2008	Playbill	
Bootleg: Boardmixes from the Road	2010	Practical Magic	
Ah, Men! The Boys of Broadway	2012	Palmetto	Songs sung by men on Broadway
Ghostlight	2014	Practical Magic	Produced by T Bone Burnett
Story Songs	2017	Palmetto	
Hope	2018	Palmetto	

Cast recordings
Show	Cast	Year	Role
1776	Original Broadway Cast	1969	Martha Jefferson
Promises, Promises	Original London Cast	1969	Fran Kubelik
Hair	Film Soundtrack	1979	
I'm Getting My Act Together and Taking It on the Road	Off-Broadway Cast	1980	Heather
Cats	Original Broadway Cast	1982	Grizabella
The Mystery of Edwin Drood	Original Broadway Cast	1985	Edwin Drood / Dick Datchery / Miss Alice Nutting
Prom Queens Unchained	Studio Cast	1997	
The Civil War	Concept Album	1998	
Triumph of Love	Original Broadway Cast	1998	Hesione
Elegies, A Song Cycle	Original Off-Broadway Cast	2003	

Other contributions
Album	Year	Notes
Sondheim: A Celebration at Carnegie Hall	1992	Sings "Children Will Listen"
George & Ira Gershwin: A Musical Celebration	1993	Sings "How Long Has This Been Going On?"
Mathis on Broadway	2000	Sings "Children Will Listen" and "Our Children"
The Maury Yeston Songbook	2003	Sings "I Had a Dream About You" and "Be on Your Own"
The Diaries of Adam and Eve, by Mark Twain	Unknown	Reads the part of Eve

== Awards and nominations ==
Year	Award	Category	Work	Result
1983	Tony Award	Best Featured Actress in a Musical	Cats	Won
1983	Drama Desk Award	Outstanding Actress in a Musical	Cats	Nominated
1985	Daytime Emmy Award	Outstanding Performer in a Children's Program/Special	NBC Special Treat: Bobby and Sarah	Nominated
1989	Daytime Emmy Award	Outstanding Performer in a Children's Program/Special	ABC Afterschool Special: Taking a Stand	Nominated
1995	Olivier Award	Best Actress in a Musical	Sunset Boulevard	Nominated
1998	Tony Award	Best Actress in a Musical	Triumph of Love	Nominated
1998	Drama Desk Award	Outstanding Featured Actress in a Musical	Triumph of Love	Nominated
2000	Grammy Award	Best Spoken Word Album	The Diaries of Adam and Eve	Nominated
2002	Grammy Award	Best Traditional Pop Vocal Album	Stars and the Moon: Live at the Donmar	Nominated
2014	Drama Desk Award	Outstanding Featured Actress in a Play	The Old Friends	Nominated
2016	Fright Meter Awards	Best Actress	Split	Won
2017	Saturn Awards	Best Supporting Actress	Split	Nominated

=== Honorary awards ===
- 2004 – Legend of Cabaret Award
- 2007 – Texas Film Hall of Fame Inductee
- 2012 – American Theater Hall of Fame Inductee
