= The Frankenstein Theory =

- Promotional film poster
- Directed by: Andrew Weiner
- Written by: Vlady Pildysh; Andrew Weiner
- Story by: Vlady Pildysh
- Produced by: Gary Bryman; Caleb Kramer; Andrew Weiner
- Starring: Kris Lemche; Heather Stephens; Eric Zuckerman; Brian Henderson; Joe Egender; Roger Morrisey; Christine Lakin; Timothy V. Murphy
- Cinematography: Luke Geissbühler
- Edited by: Meg Ramsey
- Music by: James T. Sale
- Production companies: Rocket; Inner Station; Therapy Content; Arctic Film Group
- Distributed by: Image Entertainment
- Release date: March 1, 2013
- Running time: 87 minutes
- Country: United States
- Language: English

The Frankenstein Theory is a 2013 American horror film directed by Andrew Weiner and stars Kris Lemche, Joe Egender, Timothy V. Murphy, and Eric Zuckerman. The film is distributed by Image Entertainment. It is presented as "found footage", pieced together from a film crew's footage. The film relates the story of a documentary film crew that follows a professor who journeys to the Arctic Circle in order to prove that Mary Shelley's classic 1818 novel, Frankenstein; or, The Modern Prometheus, was based on fact.

== Plot ==
When interviewed by a film crew, Professor Jonathan Venkenheim claims that Mary Shelley's Frankenstein is a fictionalized account of his ancestor Johann's accomplishments. Venkenheim's girlfriend Anne, interviewed separately, scoffs at his theory and reveals his recent suspension. The film crew shares her view, except for the director Vicky who is Venkenheim's friend. Venkenheim discusses how the Illuminati were trying to discover the secret of life when Johann secretly founded genetics. As Johann destroyed his research notes, presumably to keep it out of the wrong hands, Venkenheim has no proof.

Venkenheim and the film crew leave for Canada, stopping along the way to meet Clarence, who survived an encounter with the monster. Clarence identifies his attacker using a sketch of what Venkenheim claims is a nineteenth century murderer. Clarence, a meth dealer, reacts erratically to this claim. Shaken and scared, the crew quickly leaves to pick up their guide, Karl. Citing his obsession, Anne breaks up with Venkenheim, but he remains determined. Along the way, Venkenheim reveals his belief that the monster is an experiment in longevity and can unlock many scientific mysteries. The group eventually abandons their car in favor of snowmobiles. Eric, the producer, catches glimpses of a mysterious figure, while Venkenheim claims to feel the monster's presence. The group hears wolves howling, though Karl dismisses their concerns.

At their destination, they find an old yurt and some bones, seemingly validating Venkenheim's theories. Luke, the camera man, briefly sees something moving in the distance. Venkenheim produces a map, theorizing the monster follows a large herd of caribou and kills in self-defense when he approaches civilization. The crew reacts with fear and anger, and Brian almost gets into a fight with Venkenheim; Vicky defuses the situation. Karl disputes the existence of a monster and instead suggests a bear, telling them a story about a friend who was terrorized by a polar bear. Karl concludes by warning them not to mess with the forces of nature. At night, they hear wolves howling again, but a monstrous growling cuts them off. Venkenheim thinks it's the monster, but Brian disagrees.

In the morning, they find a snowmobile vandalized and another stolen. Karl leaves to hunt down the vandal, despite Venkenheim's protests. Brian and Eric eventually discover Karl's body and panic, insisting they all leave immediately. Venkenheim refuses and argues that the creature killed Karl because he felt threatened. Luke takes the remaining snowmobile to seek help. A day later, Vicky reports that Luke has not returned, a storm has arrived, and no help will come. They discuss the possibility that the monster is responsible for Luke's disappearance; Venkenheim suggests they appeal to the monster's humanity, as the monster is intelligent and seeking companionship, which Vicky doubts. At night, they hear the monster growling again, which Venkenheim interprets as a warning to leave – something they can't do.

In the morning, the group sets out on foot, following Luke's tracks, and finally spots his abandoned snowmobile. They split up, looking for Luke, but, when Brian discovers Luke's body, the monster attacks and kills him. Venkenheim insists that they go back to the yurt and wait for help, but the monster is in the yurt, enraged. Despite Venkenheim's warning not to run, Eric panics and is killed by the monster. Attempting to reason with the monster, Venkenheim pushes his luck by insisting on touching it. Venkenheim is ripped apart off-camera as Vicky cowers in the yurt. The monster breaks down the door, throws her around, and stomps off with her body as well as carrying the red-headed female doll earlier found in the yurt.

== Cast ==
- Kris Lemche as Professor Jonathan Venkenheim
- Joe Egender as Clarence, who survived an attack by the monster
- Timothy V. Murphy as Karl, the guide
- Eric Zuckerman as Eric, assistant producer
- Brian Henderson as Brian, the sound engineer
- Christine Lakin as Anne, Jonathan's girlfriend
- Heather Stephens as Vicky, the director
- Luke Geissbuhler as Luke, the camera man
- Roger Morrissey as the monster

== Production ==
Shooting took place in Los Angeles and Alaska, which was chosen to save money. The scenes shot in Alaska required lengthy setup times, involving 45 minute walks through the snow.

Kris Lemche initially expressed some worry that he was too young to convincingly play a professor, but Andrew Weiner didn't consider it an issue, instead suggesting that the character might have something to prove.

Director Andrew Weiner says the isolation and loneliness felt by the creature and Venkenheim was reflected by the inhospitable surroundings; Venkenheim is directly inspired by Victor Frankenstein.

== Release ==
Image Entertainment released The Frankenstein Theory to select theaters and video-on-demand on March 1, 2013, with the DVD released March 26, 2013.

== Reception ==
Dread Central gave it 1.5/5 stars and called it a "crushing bore", while The Washington Post gave it 2/4 stars, describing the plot as clever but silly. The Oklahoma Gazette, in a more positive review, commented that the film was not as original as the marketing promised but remained better than the average "found footage" film. Ryan Larson of Shock Till You Drop wrote, "It’s easily in the forefront of straight-to-dvd found footage films, maybe even topping it." Mark L. Miller of Ain't It Cool News gave the film a positive review calling the concept of a found footage Frankenstein film "something of a first for the subgenre" and saying "there are definitely some moments that’ll make you jump." Michael O'Sullivan of The Washington Post wrote, "Although the technique may be a bit tired — and the source material almost 200 years old — there's something refreshing about the lengths to which the movie won't go in its search for old-fashioned frights." Bill Gibron of DVD Talk rated it 2/5 stars and wrote, "The idea is excellent. The execution is not." Patrick Naugle of DVD Verdict wrote, "The Frankenstein Theory doesn't do enough to separate itself from the pack of found footage movies cluttering up local Best Buy shelves. While it's hardly a resounding failure, it features too little horror and too much dialogue."
