= Octopus 2: River of Fear =

2001 action/horror film by Yossi Wein

Octopus 2: River of Fear is a 2001 action-horror sequel to Octopus. It was directed by Yossi Wein and produced by Boaz Davidson. Davidson also wrote the film's screenplay.

== Plot ==
Dead bodies are being found in the New York Harbor. The police have no clues nor suspects until Nick and his partner realize the killer is a giant octopus. Nick and his partner confront the octopus and wrestles it as it try to eat another victim. Nick fails and the victim is eaten. Nick's partner tried to lure the octopus away from Nick using a craine and the octopus closes the crane with its tentacles. Nick's partner gets eaten alive by the octopus. Spedders heads back to the harbor to kill the octopus. Initially, he thinks he blows up the octopus. He proceeds to rescue a bus full of children with Rachel. The octopus returns but is killed by Nick Spedding and another officer before it can attack again.

== Cast ==
- Michael Reilly Burke as Nick Hartfield
- Meredith Morton as Rachel Starbird
- Fredric Lehne as Walter
- John Thaddeus as Tony
- Chris Williams as Payton / X-Ray
- Stoyan Angelov as X-Ray
- Paul Vincent O'Connor as Capt. Hensley
- Clement Blake as Mad Dog
- Duncan Fraser as Mayor
- Violeta Markovska as Anna Lee
- Shane Edelman as Mayor's Aide
- Harry Anichkin as Judge
- Velizar Binev as Hotel Manager

== Reception ==
Hell Horror said that the film "is an American horror movie that was an utter waste of my time."

== See also ==
- List of killer octopus films
