= Hearts Are Wild =

American drama television series

- David Beecroft and Diana Muldaur in the pilot episode, 1992
- Genre: Drama
- Created by: Eric Roth
- Starring: David Beecroft; Catherine Mary Stewart
- Opening theme: "Viva Las Vegas"
- Country of origin: United States
- Original language: English
- No. of seasons: 1
- No. of episodes: 7

Production
- Executive producers: Aaron Spelling; E. Duke Vincent
- Running time: 60 minutes
- Production companies: Spelling Television; Lorimar Television

Original release
- Network: CBS
- Release: January 10 – March 13, 1992

Hearts Are Wild is an American drama television series that aired on CBS on Fridays at 10:00 p.m Eastern time from January 10 to March 13, 1992. The series was filmed on location in Las Vegas, Nevada. It was produced by Aaron Spelling and starred David Beecroft and Catherine Mary Stewart. Each episode followed three parallel storylines in the style of The Love Boat: a dramatic main story for the prominent guest stars, a comic subplot for secondary players, and a shorter closing story ending on either a comic or sentimental note. The show drew mixed-to-negative critical notices upon its premiere. Ken Tucker of Entertainment Weekly gave it a D−, while Rick Kogan of the Chicago Tribune described it as drifting through "trite subplots." David Hiltbrand of People was comparatively generous, awarding a B− and crediting the show's opulent settings and production values. Tom Jicha of the South Florida Sun-Sentinel called it "unwatchable and dumb." The series was not renewed after its initial seven-episode run.

== Premise ==
Hearts Are Wild centered on the guest and staff of Caesars Palace in Las Vegas. Among those shown were Jack Thorpe, the owner, Leon "Pepe" Pepperman, the manager, and Kyle Hubbard, the head of guest relations. Among the famous people who played guest were Dick Van Patten, Diana Muldaur, Mickey Rooney, Tom Bosley, Bonnie Franklin, Isabel Sanford, Ricardo Montalbán, Khrystyne Haje, Barbara Rush, Marcia Wallace, Irene Cara, and Gene Barry.

== Cast ==
- David Beecroft as Jack Thorpe
- Jon Polito as Leon "Pepe" Pepperman
- Catherine Mary Stewart as Kyle Hubbard

== Episodes ==
No.	Title	Directed by	Written by	Original release date
1	"The Other Woman"	Unknown	Unknown	January 10, 1992
2	"Blind Love"	Harry Harris	Michael Fisher & Chris Brancato	January 17, 1992
3	"Jack of Hearts"	Unknown	Unknown	January 24, 1992
4	"The Catch"	Unknown	Unknown	January 31, 1992
5	"One Magic Summer"	Unknown	Unknown	February 28, 1992
6	"Coming Home"	Unknown	Unknown	March 6, 1992
7	"The Maestro"	Unknown	Unknown	March 13, 1992

== See also ==
- List of television shows set in Las Vegas

== Bibliography ==
- Tim Brooks and Earle Marsh, The Complete Directory to Prime Time Network and Cable TV Shows 1946–Present, Ninth edition (New York: Ballantine Books, 2007) ISBN 978-0-345-49773-4
