= Hunger (2009 film) =

- Directed by: Steven Hentges
- Written by: L.D. Goffigan
- Produced by: John Sawyer; F.X. Vitolo
- Starring: Lori Heuring; Linden Ashby; Joe Egender; Lea Kohl; Julian Rojas
- Cinematography: John Sawyer
- Edited by: Jessica N. Kehrhahn
- Music by: John Califra
- Production companies: 5 States; Global Empire Studios; Liberty Artists
- Distributed by: Lightning Media
- Release dates: May 15, 2009 (Jacksonville); September 28, 2010
- Running time: 97 minutes
- Country: United States
- Language: English
- Budget: $625,000
- Box office: 4.5 million

Hunger is a 2009 American horror film directed by Steven Hentges and written by L.D. Goffigan.

== Plot ==
Five individuals unknown to each other—Jordan, Grant, Luke, Anna, and Alex—wake up in complete darkness surrounded by stone walls. They realize they have been abducted and make their way through a dark corridor trying to find a way out. The group discovers another room and realize that they have been placed at the bottom of an abandoned well. The well contains an in-ground toilet, toilet paper and four barrels of water but there is no food. There is also a clock that has thirty-hour marks on it and Jordan later reveals that one mark equals one day. Grant forms a bond with Jordan and encourages the group to work together to find a way out. Luke is disrespectful and aggressive and frequently challenges Grant‘s authority. An unidentified man watches and takes notes about the group’s behaviors behind the monitor of several hidden cameras.

On the second day a scalpel appears on one of the barrels of water. A note attached to the scalpel reads “the human body can only survive thirty days without eating“ and Jordan explains to the group that scalpels are designed for cutting into human tissue. The kidnapper’s identity is revealed and a flashback occurs to a boy with similar features. The boy and his mother are in a car accident and the boy realizes that his mother has died. The boy is trapped inside the car until discovered by authorities two weeks later. To the authorities’ surprise the boy survived the two weeks by eating the flesh of his deceased mother. In the present, photos on the captor’s wall reveal that he has been stalking his victims for quite some time.

As the days go by Luke, Anna, and Alex make plans to kill Grant who is dying faster due to a pre-existing condition. The three eventually knock Jordan unconscious, steal the scalpel and attack Grant—killing and eating his flesh. More time goes by and the three debate whether or not to kill Jordan. Alex eventually loses grip on reality and attempts to bite Anna. Luke stabs Alex in the neck and the Luke and Anna eat him next. Fearing for her life, Jordan steals the scalpel and runs into the room with the water, locking the door behind her. Luke eventually becomes unstable and strangles Anna. Jordan appears and kills Luke with the scalpel. Jordan then addresses the hidden camera, telling their kidnapper that she will not play his game by eating the remaining bodies, and states that she would rather just die. Jordan uses Luke‘s blood to write a message and obstructs its from the camera’s view. She sits beside it motionless for the next two days. Overwhelmed with curiosity and frustration the kidnapper climbs a rope ladder down to the bottom of the well. As he reads the hidden message Jordan mortally stabs her kidnapper with a piece of broken bone. Jordan is then able to climb the up ladder into the sun and collapses in exhaustion.

== Cast ==
- Lori Heuring as Jordan
- Linden Ashby as Grant
- Joe Egender as Luke
- Lea Kohl as Anna
- Julian Rojas as Alex
- Bjørn Johnson as The Scientist
