= Amanda Aday =

American actress (born 1981)

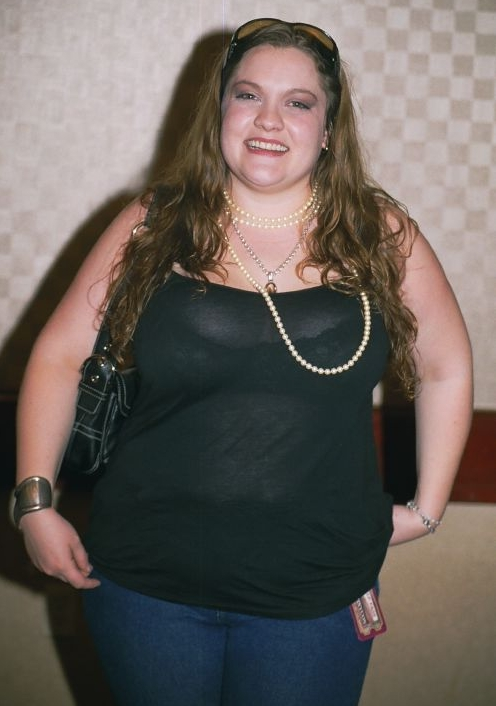
- Born: Amanda Lee Aday; January 21, 1981 (age 45); New York City, U.S.
- Occupation: Actress
- Years active: 1995–present
- Parent(s): Meat Loaf; Leslie Aday
- Relatives: Pearl Aday (half-sister)

Amanda Lee Aday (born January 21, 1981) is an American actress. She is best known for her recurring role as Dora Mae Dreifuss on the first season of the HBO series Carnivàle (2003–2005).

== Early life and family ==
Born in New York City, Aday is the daughter of singer and actor Meat Loaf and Leslie Aday, and half-sister of singer Pearl Aday. She attended Stagedoor Manor, a summer theatre/dance camp in the Catskill Mountains in the Appalachians (New York), from 1990 through 1996, and then graduated from Idyllwild Arts Academy, a private school located in Idyllwild (Riverside County, California). She then majored in theatre at the California Institute of the Arts, a private university located in Valencia (Santa Clarita, California). In 2020, Aday started a cooking channel on YouTube called All Access Eats.

== Acting career ==
Aday's film roles include Crazy in Alabama, Mummy an' the Armadillo, South Dakota: A Woman's Right to Choose and The Trials of Cate McCall. In addition to her work on Carnivàle, she has guest starred on the hit TV shows Boston Public, ER, Private Practice, and My Name Is Earl.

== Filmography ==
Year	Title	Role	Notes
1995	To Catch a Yeti		
1999	Crazy in Alabama	Assistant at Bewitched	
2000	Meat Loaf: To Hell and Back	Clerk	
2002	Boston Public	Carrie Jenkins	
2003	Carnivàle	Dora Mae Dreifuss	Guest star, episodes: "Milfay" "After the Ball Is Over" "Tipton" "Black Blizzard" "Babylon" "Pick a Number"
2004	Mummy an' the Armadillo	Bevers	
2006	National Lampoon's Pledge This!	Maxine Picker	
2008	South Dakota: A Woman's Right to Choose	Jane	
2008	ER	Pregnant Waitress	Guest star, episode: "Let It Snow"
2008	My Name Is Earl	Tammy	Guest star, episode: "Orphan Earl"
2009	Restoration Dogs	Lady Long Tongue	
2011	Private Practice	Patty	Guest star, episode: "God Bless the Child"
2011	Rizzoli & Isles	Female Dockworker	Guest star, episode: "Gone Daddy Gone"
2013	The Trials of Cate McCall	Dorrie Booth	
2014	Shangri-La Suite	Gladys Presley (Elvis' Mother)	
2014	Madtown	Madison	
2017	South Dakota	Jane	
2022	Window with a View	Sister Bernadette	
