= Taboo (2002 film) =

- Directed by: Max Makowski
- Written by: Chris Fisher
- Produced by: Chris Fisher; Ash R. Shah
- Starring: Eddie Kaye Thomas; Nick Stahl; January Jones; Amber Benson; Derek Hamilton; Lori Heuring
- Cinematography: Viorel Sergovici Jr.
- Edited by: M. Scott Smith
- Music by: Ryan Beveridge
- Production companies: Creative Entertainment Group; Imperial Fish Company; Silver Bullet
- Distributed by: Sony Pictures Releasing
- Release date: January 14, 2002
- Running time: 80 minutes
- Country: United States
- Language: English

Taboo is a 2002 American mystery thriller film directed by Max Makowski, written by Chris Fisher, and starring Nick Stahl, Eddie Kaye Thomas, January Jones, Amber Benson, Derek Hamilton, and Lori Heuring. It was released by Columbia Tristar Home Videos on January 14, 2002.

== Plot ==
Six friends, Christian, Elizabeth, Piper, Kate, Adam, and Benjamin, play a game which consists of “yes” and “no” questions that are to be answered anonymously. Once the cards are shuffled, the questions are read aloud and answered by another participant of the game. The questions are deeply personal, covering topics such as sex and incest. Some of the questions posed included "would you sleep with a relative?” and “would you have sex with a minor?”

A year later, the group all meet again at Christian's and Elizabeth's new mansion for a New Year's Eve dinner. The night goes well until the electricity powers out and a package arrives at the door containing six cards; written on them are the words, “prostitute, infidel, homosexual, rapist and hypocrite”. These words are associated with the questions that were posed during the Taboo game that they played the previous year.

Horrified by the package, Elizabeth decides to get more wine to alleviate everyone's concerns. Adam, whose question was, “would you have sex with a minor”, follows Elizabeth to the wine cellar and accuses her of arranging the delivery of the package. Elizabeth runs upstairs and tells her friends that she was attacked by Adam. When Christian and Elizabeth go back to the cellar, they find Adam with a knife lodged in his stomach and the word “rapist” attached to said knife.

The couple joins the rest of the group downstairs. Piper, in her drunken state, brings up Christian's father's past affair with a prostitute. Once he impregnates her, he vanishes after his family discovers his infidelity. Piper then questions Benjamin's sexuality. He reveals that he is dating Kate to show his parents that he is not gay in order to keep his inheritance. Shortly after, as Elizabeth and Christian go to a room to speak privately, they discover Benjamin in their bathtub, killed via electrocution with the "homosexual" card beside the tub.

While Elizabeth begins to look for Christian, Kate approaches Elizabeth with a shotgun, accusing her and Christian of killing Adam and Benjamin. As Elizabeth runs downstairs to look for Christian, Elizabeth finds Piper murdered by means of a dog collar strangulation with the word "infidel" lying adjacent to her lifeless body. As Elizabeth continues to search for Christian, Kate confronts Elizabeth again, angered by the incessant accusation, Elizabeth attempts to shoot Kate, but much to her dismay, the gun was not loaded. Kate becomes infuriated so she decides to blindfold Elizabeth, and lead her to Christian's location using “hot” and “cold” signals. As Kate and Elizabeth reach upstairs, Christian shoots Kate in the head and the couple transport her body to the living room along with the other bodies.

Christian coerces Elizabeth to confess of setting up the game in order to expose the others’ moral weaknesses and exploited their secrets as leverage for blackmail. Christian then reveals to Elizabeth that he is the killer and reasons that his motive was to protect Elizabeth because the group had become aware of her deception and they were going to take advantage of the dinner gathering to get revenge against Elizabeth. Shortly after his revelation, Christian discloses that the others have merely faked their deaths as a ruse to assure Elizabeth would confess to her deceit, astonished with these news, Elizabeth flees while Christian chases her. Meanwhile, Kate sets out to find Elizabeth's card from the game a year ago and discovers that Elizabeth divulged that she would have sex with a relative. Having no time to react, Kate is suddenly locked in the room.

Later, Christian finds Elizabeth, who tries to seduce him. She then reveals that she is Christian's sister from his father's affair; Christian accepts Elizabeth as his sister and devises a plan to kill everyone in the house to protect their newfound secret. He then proceeds to shoot Benjamin and Adam, bludgeon Piper with his shotgun, and stab Kate with a pool cue. Once the murder spree is complete, Elizabeth demands Christian half of their father's fortune, and they negotiate the matter over dinner, only to find out that Christian has poisoned the wine. Elizabeth's final question of what will happen to Christian lingers unanswered as he too takes a glass of the poisoned wine to live up to his family's motto of “virtue, family, and justice.”

== Cast ==
- Nick Stahl as Christian Turner, a wealthy man that inherited his father's wealth, known as the hypocrite.
- Eddie Kaye Thomas as Adam, the person blackmailed for having sexual interactions with a minor, known as the rapist.
- January Jones as Elizabeth, Christian's fiancé and sister, who did not receive a word from the package.
- Lori Heuring as Katie, the only person willing to have sex for money, known as the prostitute.
- Derek Hamilton as Benjamin pays Kate to be his girlfriend to keep his inheritance, known as the homosexual.
- Amber Benson as Piper, an alcoholic and Christian's ex-girlfriend, known as the infidel.

== Critical reception ==
Reviewers generally agree that despite an impressive cast, the film is awful. David Nusair of Reel Films Reviews states that Nick Stahl, the lead actor, already proved his abilities in the 2001 films In the Bedroom and Bully; he suggests that Stahl probably owed the director a favor and was forced to take a starring role. Also, Chris Fisher's screenwriting is singled out for criticism; Nusair describes the dialogue as forced and stagy, the plot as sloppy and rushed, and the dizzying variety of elements, from murder mystery to trashy soap opera, as pointless and bad. Reviewer Eric Snider also criticizes the screenwriting, singling out the dialogue for special criticism as awkward and unbelievable, and suggests that if Taboo had been made as a parody of ridiculous horror films, it would have been a success.

== Release ==
The film premiered on 14 January 2002 at the Sundance Film Festival.
