= Playbill Records =

American record label

- Parent company: Sony Music Entertainment
- Founded: 2006
- Distributor(s): Sony BMG Masterworks (In the US)
- Genre: Various
- Country of origin: US
- Official website: http://www.playbillrecords.com/

Playbill Records is an American record label, and subsidiary of Sony Music Entertainment.

== History ==
Playbill, a monthly publication for theatre, music and the performing arts, expanded into music through Playbill Records in June 2006. Launched in partnership with Sony BMG's Legacy Recordings and Sony BMG Masterworks, the label's primary goal is to develop a broad fanbase for artists, while at the same time introducing new audiences to the recordings contained in Sony BMG's archives. Playbill's first artists signed were Broadway performers Brian Stokes Mitchell and Betty Buckley.

Playbill president Philip S. Birsh described three different categories of recordings on their label. First is original music. The second will be the creation of compilations, which will go under the heading of Playbill Editors' Choice. The third part of the joint venture between Playbill and Sony BMG is the re-releasing of remixed and remastered Broadway recordings.

== Playbill Artists ==
Artists on the current Playbill Records roster include (listed alphabetically):

- Betty Buckley
- Brian Stokes Mitchell

== See also ==
- List of record labels
