= Madtown (film) =

2016 film directed by Charles Moore

Madtown is a 2016 action drama film, starring Milo Ventimiglia, and directed by Charles Moore. Filmed in Cleveland, Ohio, the film premiered at the 2016 Cleveland International Film Festival and had a limited theatrical release in the United States on for January 5, 2018.

== Cast ==
- Milo Ventimiglia as Denny Briggs
- Rachel Melvin as Sarah
- Amanda Aday as Madison Briggs
- John Billingsley as Loyd Zane Miller
- Bonita Friedericy as Linda Miller
- Matt Lockwood as Shaun
- Joshua Elijah Reese as Mandel
- Brett Castro as Young Denny
- Kinsley Funari as Young Madison
