= Shadowzone (film) =

- DVD cover
- Directed by: J. S. Cardone
- Written by: J. S. Cardone
- Produced by: Carol Kottenbrook
- Starring: Louise Fletcher; David Beecroft; James Hong; Miguel A. Núñez, Jr.
- Cinematography: Karen Grossman
- Edited by: Thomas Meshelski
- Music by: Richard Band
- Distributed by: Full Moon
- Release date: February 22, 1990
- Running time: 88 minutes
- Country: United States
- Language: English

Shadowzone is a 1990 science fiction horror film directed by J. S. Cardone.

== Plot ==
NASA Captain Hickock arrives at Jackass Flats Proving Ground, a subterranean research facility. Mostly abandoned in 1962, it now houses “Project Shadowzone”. Hickock has been sent to investigate the death of a Shadowzone test subject and Tommy Shivers, the last of the maintenance staff, escorts him through the facility where they meet Dr. Erhardt, the second in command under Dr. Van Fleet. She introduces Dr. Kidwell, Wiley (the sole computer engineer), and finally Dr. Jonathan Van Fleet. The experiment consists of inducing extended deep sleep (EDS) in the two remaining patients while they’re in sleep chambers. To prove it isn’t life threatening, Hickock insists the test be done again with all the same parameters, only longer this time, and Van Fleet reluctantly complies. The male subject’s veins begin to swell and eventually his head explodes. The computer system malfunctions and blows the site’s main power transformer causing an emergency shut down, sealing off the lab.

Van Fleet, Kidwell, and Hickock enter the test lab and move the female subject’s sleep chamber into the computer lab when Wiley notices a fifth life form present on the heat-signature screen. Erhardt tells them to get out and that “John Doe” has arrived. Van Fleet seals himself in the lab and is attacked and killed. Erhardt explains their sleep experiment uncovered a gateway through the unconscious mind to a parallel dimension where they made contact with a life form (dubbed John Doe). She theorizes that John Doe has entered their dimension through the remaining male test subject. Wiley finds John Doe is no longer on the lab’s heat signature and theorizes the creature can expand and contract its molecular structure at will (making it essentially a shapeshifter) and escaped through a drain pipe. The creature, also mildly radioactive, triggers the site’s emergency airlock, installed as a failsafe for the nuclear research done in the ’60s, sealing them underground. Wiley and Hickock go to fix the transformer and Shivers and Kidwell go to get the site cook, Mrs. Cutter, while Erhardt stays with Jenna, the female subject (who cannot be woken until the main power is restored), to monitor her.

When Kidwell investigates the screeching of one of the lab monkeys, she finds the cage mangled and radios Shivers to help with the search. Meanwhile, Cutter hears one of her rat traps snap. As she reaches into the wall, a massive deformed rat bursts through and tears off her arm. Kidwell discovers the monkey and radios the others, but Shivers responds that he already has the monkey with him. Kidwell’s screams are then heard over the intercom as the monkey she found mutates and attacks her. Shivers discovers Cutter’s body and panics, firing his shotgun wildly. Wiley and Hickock abandon their attempt to repair the transformer and follow the noise, but only find chunks of flesh splattered on the walls and ceiling. Wiley manually restores power to the elevator, but it shorts out and only Hickock manages to get inside. Wiley’s blood splatters against the elevator window as he is pulled offscreen. Hickock climbs through the top of the elevator and up to the lab level.

In the computer lab, Erhardt becomes fascinated by the creature and theorizes that “John Doe” not only shapeshifts but can also assume forms based on human thought. Kidwell was searching for the monkey when she encountered it, and Dr. Van Fleet, before fleeing, had called out a phobia noted in his psychological evaluation—suggesting the entity had taken the form of his worst fear before killing him. The power suddenly returns, as does the creature, reappearing in the test lab. It takes control of the computer system and communicates that it is dying and needs to return to its own dimension, promising to spare them if they help it go back. Hickock connects the female subject to the test lab and they induce EDS under the same parameters that killed the first two patients, opening a portal to the other dimension. Erhardt insists on witnessing it firsthand, inserting a metal rod into the portal and watching it pulled through. She briefly steps inside, then reemerges excitedly declaring, “There are thousands of them!” The rod is then thrust back through the portal, impaling her chest. The creature emerges, examines Jenna’s pod, roars at Hickock, and drags Erhardt’s body back into the portal. Hickock destroys the computers with a fire axe until an electric shock throws him across the room, knocking him unconscious. He awakens to find the female subject revived and releases her from the sleep chamber as the credits roll.

== Cast ==
- Louise Fletcher as Dr. Erhardt, a 5 year veteran on Shadowzone, she’s calculating and overbearing, not unlike another character Fletcher’s portrayed, Nurse Ratched and is Dr. Van Fleet’s assistant
- David Beecroft as Captain Hickock, a NASA Captain who investigates research related deaths, he goes simply by “Hickock”
- James Hong as Dr. Van Fleet, the lead scientist on Project Shadowzone
- Frederick Flynn as Tommy Shivers, his father worked in the facility in the 50’s, he’s the last maintenance man on site for Shadowzone
- Shawn Weatherly as Dr. Kidwell, cares for the experiment’s old test animals and acts as the medical examiner for the project
- Miguel A. Núñez Jr. as Wiley, the project’s computer engineer
- Lu Leonard as Mrs. Cutter, the facility’s cook

== Release ==
Shadowzone was the second of three films released by Full Moon while using the company name "Full Moon Productions" after 1989’s Puppet Master and followed by Meridian: Kiss of the Beast. After these three films, the company adopted the moniker "Full Moon Entertainment". The film saw an initial release sometime in January or February 1990 distributed by Castle Hill as it was included in a list of new films expected to be released in 1990 in a "Coming Soon" article from the Los Angeles Times published January of that year. It saw a home media release on VHS by Paramount Home Entertainment on February 22, 1990.

Full Moon released the film onto DVD in 2000, but it was discontinued for copyright reasons. It has since been re-released (by Full Moon Entertainment) on DVD several times and in the Full Moon Classics, Volume 1 box set, containing other Full Moon films like Arcade, Bad Channels, Seedpeople, and Netherworld.

== Reception ==
Starburst Magazine gave the film a positive review and 7/10 stars in 2014, calling it a “little-known offering” but a “pleasant surprise” nonetheless. Reviewer Julian White specifically praised the film’s production design as “attractively rusty and rickety”, the characters as “complex and flawed”, and the script for creating “credible conundrums for the characters to worry about”. He goes on to further commend the film’s casting, praising Hong’s over-the-top performance as Dr. Van Fleet—the scientist who will stop at nothing to see his experiment through as well as Beecroft’s leading man, despite his lack of star power. The pinnacle of the film however, is Fletcher’s performance as “the morally compromised but well intentioned” Erhardt, who White calls “so good it makes you weep with frustration that she wasn't better appreciated by Hollywood”. The review also covers the quality of the DVD itself.

Critic Phil Wheat called the film his "favorite non-franchise Full Moon flick" in a review written for Nerdly in 2014. He specifically praises the creature/gore effects by Mark Shostrom (Evil Dead II & A Nightmare on Elm Street 3: Dream Warriors) as well as the casting of Fletcher and Hong.

HorrorNews.net gave the film 4/5 stars in their review published in 2012. The review argues the film has all the right elements for a good science fiction/horror genre entry, but the execution is lacking. It goes on to commend the special effects and concludes that the films is "overshadowed by films like The Thing which tackle the subject matter a bit more effectively".

The film was also covered as part of "Full Moon Friday" at Cinema-Crazed.com, although it was not recommended. The review mostly argues that the film is boring and is confusing in tone.
