= Octopus (2000 film) =

2000 film directed by John Eyres

- Genre: Horror
- Story by: Boaz Davidson
- Directed by: John Eyres
- Starring: Jay Harrington; David Beecroft; Carolyn Lowery; Ravil Isyanov; Rico Ross
- Country of origin: United States
- Original language: English

Production
- Producers: Boaz Davidson; Danny Lerner; David Varod
- Production company: Nu Image

Original release
- Network: USA Network
- Release: October 11, 2000

Octopus is a 2000 American made-for-television action horror film produced by Nu Image that premiered on the USA Network on October 11, 2000. The film stars Jay Harrington, David Beecroft and Ricco Ross.

== Plot ==
In October 1962, during the Cuban Missile Crisis, a Soviet submarine delivers barrels of nuclear material to Cuba, and has to outrun an American submarine. When one of the crewmen suggests that the submarine should slow down and identify itself, the captain shoots him. The submarine is hit by torpedoes and damaged, drowning the crew and releasing radioactive material into its nearby waters. It causes an octopus to grow into a monstrous size, attacking submarines and naval vehicles off Cuba's coasts.

In the year 2000, in Sofia, Bulgaria, two CIA officials, Roy Turner and Henry Campbell, discuss about files, before they go out for a walk. Meanwhile, someone disguised as an old woman gives a bag to an official's daughter, but the bomb inside the bag detonates, killing everyone inside the American embassy and injuring many people nearby. The two officials pursue the old woman, but the old woman's henchmen crash a car at Henry, injuring and killing him. Afterwards, Roy pursues the old woman and captures her, and she is revealed to be the leader of a terrorist group.

The terrorist is captured and taken into a submarine, but his henchmen hijack the vehicle and threaten the crew to release him. However, the submarine is attacked by the giant octopus from before.

== Cast ==
- Jay Harrington as Roy Turner
- Ravil Isyanov as Casper
- David Beecroft as Capt. Jack Shaw
- Carolyn Lowery as Dr. Lisa Finch
- Rico Ross as Brickman
- Jeff Nuttall as Henry Campbell
- George Stanchev as Salvanto
- Martin McDougall as Taylor

== Production ==
Octopus was in development as early as 1999.

Director John Eyers was approached by David Varod, Danny Lerner and Boaz Davidson of Nu Image with a treatment for the film, followed by a screenplay being developed "pretty quickly" according to Eyers. "My directional background has been in doing quite a bit of sci-fi, so it wasn't that much of a stretch." The film was shot in Bulgaria with a 36 day shooting time and a $5 million budget.

The octopus in the film was created through a combination of CGI, miniatures and animatronics. One of the tentacles has a 30-foot section of animatronic arm while the CGI sequences were done with a green screen in Bulgaria.

== Release ==
The film was shown on television on the USA Network on October 11, 2000.

The film was released on DVD and VHS in November 2000. By July 2000, Nu Image had already been planning for Octopus 2 which would bring the monster to New York City.

== Reception ==
From contemporary reviews, Jerry Bokamper of the Dallas Morning News declared the film a "concomitant mess, an everything-and-the-kitchen-sink disaster.", suggesting that "If you want a sea monster movie that really sits up and barks, go back to the classics, such as The Beast from 20,000 Fathoms. An anonymous reviewer from The Advocate-Messenger gave the film one star, stating it was a "cheesy monster flick" with "mediocre special effects, banal dialog and the predictable story line add up to a crash bore"

== See also ==
- List of killer octopus films
