= True Blue (2001 film) =

2001 film directed by J. S. Cardone

- Directed by: J.S. Cardone
- Written by: J.S. Cardone
- Produced by: Scott Einbinder; Carol Kottenbrook
- Starring: Tom Berenger; Lori Heuring; Pamela Gidley
- Cinematography: Darko Suvak
- Edited by: Matthew Ramsey
- Music by: Tim Jones
- Production company: Sandstorm Films
- Release date: 29 November 2001
- Running time: 101 minutes
- Country: United States
- Language: English
- Budget: $1.5 million

True Blue is a 2001 American crime thriller film written and directed by J.S. Cardone and starring Tom Berenger, Lori Heuring, and Pamela Gidley.

== Plot summary ==
New York Police Officer Rembrandt "Remy" Macy (Berenger) investigates a murder which began by the discovery of a disembodied hand. After the victim is identified, the victim's ex-roommate, Nikki (Heuring) becomes scared that she may be in danger and stays at Macy's place until they can get to the bottom of the situation. After accidentally seeing her near-naked, he finds himself starting to become attracted to her and she is able to seduce him. As he investigates clue after clue, he finds out that a large conspiracy is in play involving some of the most powerful leaders in New York City, Chinese Triads and possibly Nikki herself.

== Principal cast ==
- Tom Berenger as Rembrandt "Remy" Macy
- Lori Heuring as Nikki
- Pamela Gidley as Beck
- Barry Newman as "Monty"
- Leo Lee as Benny Lee
- Soon-Tek Oh as "Tiger"
- Joshua Peace as Oren Doba
- Alec McClure as Bouton
- Pedro Miguel Arce as "Bounce"

== Critical reception ==
David Nussair of Reel Film Reviews gave the film 1/2 stars out of four:

J.S. Cardone read my mind and decided to make a movie I would absolutely hate (mission accomplished, Cardo!)... There's a lot going on in True Blue, but nearly all of it sucks. There's certainly nothing interesting about this storyline, which the various Law and Order shows have dealt with at one time or another... To add insult to injury, the conclusion is far more ludicrous than anything that's come before it, with Berenger double-crossed by virtually every character that was supposedly on his side. True Blue may hold some interest for Berenger completists, but really, you'd be far better off watching Shoot to Kill again.

Mitch Lovell of The Video Vacuum:

True Blue is a by the book detective flick; no more, no less... It starts off OK enough I guess, but the ending is thoroughly ridiculous as the movie piles on twist after twist in its last reel. For a flick so light on plot to begin with, the ending is especially discombobulating as person after person appear out of the shadows to sinisterly tell Berenger how and why they’re connected to the plot.
