= Vampires: The Turning =

- Release poster
- Directed by: Marty Weiss
- Written by: D.B. Farmer; Andy Hurst
- Produced by: Carol Kottenbrook; Scott Einbinder
- Starring: Colin Egglesfield; Stephanie Chao; Roger Yuan; Dom Hetrakul; Meredith Monroe; Patrick Bauchau
- Cinematography: Geoffrey Hall
- Edited by: Scott Conrad
- Music by: Tim Jones
- Production companies: Destination Films; Sandstorm Films
- Distributed by: Sony Pictures Home Entertainment
- Release date: May 3, 2005
- Running time: 83 minutes
- Country: United States
- Language: English

Vampires: The Turning is a 2005 martial arts vampire film directed by Marty Weiss and starring Colin Egglesfield, Stephanie Chao and Patrick Bauchau. It is the third and final installment of the Vampires film series, although John Carpenter who directed the first film and produced the second film had no involvement with this film, and is unrelated to the previous two films. Like the second film, this film was released on direct-to-video on May 3, 2005.

== Plot ==
Connor (Colin Egglesfield) and Amanda (Meredith Monroe) are vacationing in Thailand during that year's Songkran festival. Connor, trained since childhood in Muay Thai (Thai boxing), takes Amanda to see a match. However, Amanda cannot take the brutality and goes back to their hotel alone.

On the way, she gets lost in the Phang Nga market, and Mr Nice Guy (Dom Hetrakul) offers to show her the way to her hotel. He leads her on a short cut down a deserted alley, then turns into the vampire Niran, drinking her blood and carrying her off on a motorcycle. Connor tries to follow, but he is stopped by another vampire, obviously intent on killing him. Just as the vampire is about to succeed, a bald-headed man appears and chops off the vampire's head. Connor begs for his help finding Amanda, but he warns Connor to leave Thailand immediately and threatens to kill Connor if he follows him. Connor stealthily follows Kiko (Roger Yuan) home to Kong Sai House.

When the police refuse to consider Amanda missing until 48 hours have passed, Connor goes back to Kong Sai House, only to find the people asleep. While snooping through the house, Connor is attacked by Sang (Stephanie Chao). Connor gets away from her by jumping out a window. As Connor lands on the ground below, he is stopped by vampire slayer Raines (Patrick Bauchau) who insists on testing Connor's blood to see if he is infected. When Connor comes up clean, he begs Raines to help him find Amanda but, like Kiko, Raines warns him to leave Thailand.

Connor won't accept it and returns again to Kong Sai House. While there, he sees a photo of Niran in front of the Techno Games Arcade near the Phang Nga market. Figuring that Niran might have taken Amanda there, he snoops around. He finds Amanda being held in a cell with skeletons, carcasses, and other humans in various stages of having their blood drained. Amanda and Connor escape but are attacked outside by two jai tham (vampires who drink human blood) on a motorcycle. One drives off with Amanda; the other stays to kill Connor but he is saved by Sang and makes their escape on motorcycle. Sang turns Connor into a vampire to help give them a better chance at completing the ritual.

The day of the eclipse is upon them. Since Sang's embrace of the sun must take place in the same spot where the curse began 800 years ago (a couple blocks away), the song neng have made a deal with Raines. Raines and his slayers will line the buildings and walls that overlook the site, which looks like an archeological dig, in order to kill any jai tham who try to stop Sang. Connor, Kiko, and the rest of the song neng will help Sang get to the required spot. The eclipse starts at 3:00, and they will have 17 minutes to do the job.

The jai tham arrive on their motorcycles. In the melee that follows, Connor and Niran fall through a weak spot into a pit where they continue fighting. Time is running out, and Kiko realizes that the slayers have double-crossed them. The slayers open fire, shooting all vampires, both song neng and jai tham. Only Connor and Niran remain protected in their hole. Connor manages to impale Niran, but when he surfaces from the pit, Connor finds only bodies. He shouts for Sang, but there is no answer. Raines walks up, gloating over how much he will get for all the vampire heads AND those in the future. If Sang ends the curse, he explains, there's no more vampires, and he's in the vampire hunting business.

Connor locates Sang as Raines turns his crossbow on her. Connor offers to shoot Sang so that she does not have to suffer. Raines hands his bow to Connor. Connor aims at Sang but suddenly swings his aim to Raines. Forcing Raines to carry Sang to the designated spot, Connor gives her one last kiss before the sun reappears. She explodes, taking Raines with her, and the curse has been lifted. Connor hurries back to the jai tham's base and rescues Amanda.

== Cast ==
- Colin Egglesfield as Connor
- Stephanie Chao as Sang
- Roger Yuan as Kiko
- Patrick Bauchau as Raines
- Dom Hetrakul as Niran
- Meredith Monroe as Amanda
- Nophand Boonyai as Suwan
- Jarun Petchjaren as Moo

== See also ==
- Vampire film
