= Lori Heuring =

American actress (born 1973 / 1974)

- Born: Lori Ann Heuring; 1973 or 1974 (age 51–52); Panama City, Panama
- Years active: 1994–2019
- Website: loriheuring.com (defunct)

Lori Ann Heuring (born 1973/1974) is a Panamanian-born American former film and television actress, known for her roles in the TV movie The Locket (2002) and the direct-to-video 8mm 2 (2005).

== Early life ==
She was born in Panama City, Panama and raised in Austin, Texas. She maintains family ties with her family in Panama and has one brother. She graduated from the business honors program at the University of Texas.

== Select filmography ==
- Animal Room (1995)
- Early Edition (1998, 1 episode)
- The In Crowd (2000)
- Alias (2001, 2 episodes)
- Mulholland Drive (2001)
- Pretty When You Cry (2001)
- True Blue (2001)
- The Locket (2002, TV movie)
- Taboo (2002, direct-to-video)
- Runaway Jury (2003)
- Perfect Romance (2004, TV movie)
- Soccer Dog: European Cup (2004)
- 8mm 2 (2005, direct-to-video)
- Wicked Little Things (2006)
- Hunger (2009)
- Within (2009)
- Just Go with It (2011)
- Cross (2011, direct-to-video)
- Cross Wars (2017, direct-to-video)
- Cross 3 (2019, direct-to-video)
