= Norman Buckley =

American film director

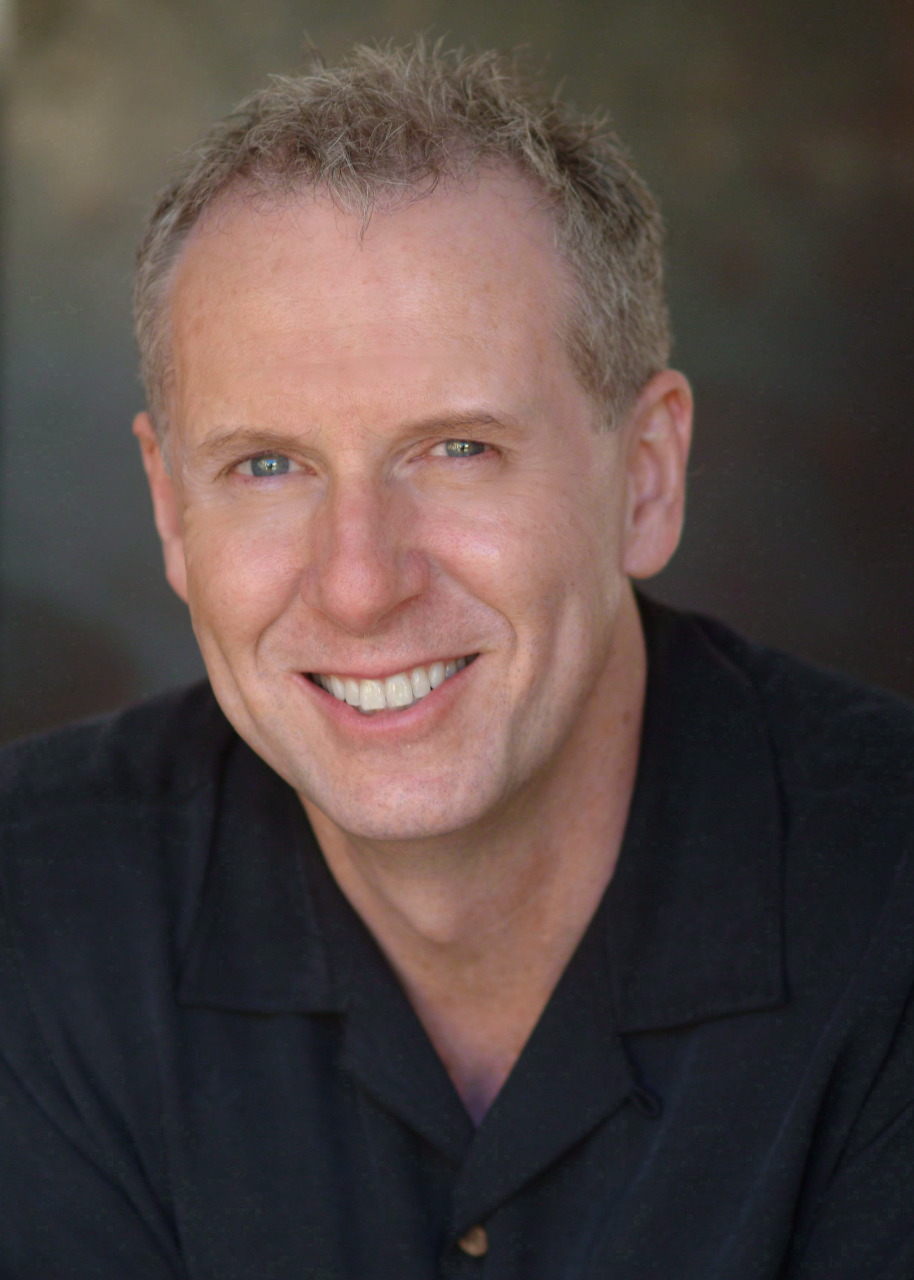
- Born: Norman L. Buckley; November 25, 1955 (age 70); Limestone, Maine, U.S.
- Occupations: Film, television director, editor
- Years active: 1977–present
- Spouse: Davyd Whaley (m. 2008; died 2014)
- Relatives: Betty Buckley (sister)

Norman L. Buckley (born November 25, 1955) is an American television director best known for his work on The O.C., Chuck, Gossip Girl, Pretty Little Liars and The Fosters.

== Early life ==
Buckley was born on Loring Air Force Base in Limestone, Maine, to parents Betty Bob (née Diltz), a dancer and journalist, and Ernest Buckley, a lieutenant colonel in the U.S. Air Force and later a college professor and dean of engineering. Buckley grew up in Fort Worth, Texas, studied history at the University of Texas at Arlington before moving to California where he later graduated from the University of Southern California. In spite of initial disapproval from his father, who wanted him to become a civil engineer like himself and Buckley's two brothers, Norman Buckley attended the film school at the University of Southern California. He intended to become a writer, but was encouraged to take up a craft in addition to writing, and he soon discovered he had a natural aptitude for film editing.

== Career ==
Buckley is most known for his directing work on the television series Pretty Little Liars and Gossip Girl. In late 2011 he directed his first movie for Lifetime, The Pregnancy Project. He began his career as an assistant editor on the 1983 film Tender Mercies, which featured his sister, actress Betty Buckley, who helped him land the job after hearing that the film's editor was seeking a local assistant while on location in Waxahachie, Texas. The editor was pleased with Buckley's work and took him to New York City to begin his career. Since then, he has worked on many films, television series and made-for-TV movies as an editor. He landed a job —as both an editor and director on The O.C. due to his connections with Stephanie Savage and McG, after working with them on the television series Fastlane. Following The O.C.'s conclusion, Buckley followed Schwartz to direct and edit his next projects, Gossip Girl and Chuck.

He was associate producer on the film Happy, Texas. He has directed episodes on various television series: The O.C., Gossip Girl, Chuck, Greek, Melrose Place, 90210, Privileged, The Middleman, Make It or Break It, Pretty Little Liars, The Client List, The Carrie Diaries, Rizzoli & Isles, Switched at Birth, Hart of Dixie, and the Josh Schwartz webseries Rockville, CA. His episode of The O.C. titled "The Metamorphosis" was chosen by Entertainment Weekly magazine as one of the five best episodes of the series. His episode of Gossip Girl titled "The Handmaiden's Tale" was chosen by Newsweek magazine as one of the ten best television episodes of 2007.

His only acting credit is a minor role in Solomon & Sheba, a part he only landed because was editing another project in Morocco, and the producers shooting Solomon & Sheba did not want to fly in other English-speaking actors to play minor parts. He agreed to do it only as a lark.

Buckley has been nominated twice for an American Cinema Editors award: in 2003, for Joe and Max, for Best Edited Motion Picture for Non-Commercial Television; and in 2008, for the pilot for Chuck, for Best Edited One-Hour Series for Commercial Television. He won the latter award at the ACE banquet on February 17, 2008.

He has been an assistant visiting professor in the film school at the University of California, Los Angeles.

== Personal life ==
Buckley has a sister, Tony Award-winning actress Betty Buckley, and two brothers, Patrick and Michael. His brother Michael died in 2020. His brothers became engineers, a profession his father thought more worthy than any job in the film industry, although Buckley has stated: "Fortunately, my father expressed his pride in my accomplishments before he died."

Buckley is openly gay. He has been widowed twice. He lived with Broadway dancer Timothy Scott from 1983 until Scott's death in 1988. In 2004, Buckley met artist Davyd Whaley and they moved in together. They married as soon as they were able, during a brief window of legal opportunity in the state of California, and remained married up to Whaley's death on October 15, 2014.
