= Enlightenment Productions =

UK entertainment company

Enlightenment Productions is multi-media entertainment company based in London and founded in partnership between producer Hanan Kattan and writer and director Shamim Sarif in 2001.

Shamim Sarif wrote her debut novel, The World Unseen, which explores issues of race, gender and sexuality, which she later adapted into an Enlightenment Productions film starring Lisa Ray and Sheetal Sheth. The film was very positively reviewed by the gay and lesbian media, with AfterEllen.com calling it "one of the best-conceived queer films of the past year – a sincere, beautifully realized vision of love and resistance in an intolerant world." The movie also enjoyed a warm reception in South Africa, winning 11 awards at the SAFTAs including Best Director and Best Writing Team. The film received a 25% "rotten" score and an average rating of 4.6 on review aggregator Rotten Tomatoes. Sarif is the recipient of Best Director awards for The World Unseen film from the South African Film and Television Awards, the Phoenix Film Festival and the Clip (Tampa) Festival.

Sarif adapted her other novel into an I Can't Think Straight, a 2008 romance film about a London-based Jordanian of Palestinian descent, Tala, who is preparing for an elaborate wedding. A turn of events causes her to have an affair and subsequently fall in love with another woman, Leyla, a British Indian. The movie is distributed by Enlightenment Productions. It was released in theatres in 2008 and 2009. The DVD was released on 4 May 2009. The movie is directed by Shamim Sarif and stars Lisa Ray and Sheetal Sheth. It won many international awards.

Enlightenment Productions' 2011 film, The House of Tomorrow, is a documentary about the 2010 TEDx Holy Land Conference, which brought together Arab and Israeli women to discuss issues of mutual interest in technology, entertainment, and design.

At Cannes Festival 2013 Enlightenment Productions announced their new film Despite The Falling Snow. The film starring Mission Impossible 5 Swedish actress Rebecca Ferguson, Game of Thrones actor Charles Dance, Oliver Jackson-Cohen, Antje Traue, Sam Reid, Anthony Head and Trudie Styler, was released in UK on 15 April 2016.

Enlightenment Productions were Winner of the Kingston Business Excellence Awards 2014, Best Creative and Media Sector Business.

In 2023, Enlightenment Productions came out with a film called, Polarized.

== Feature films ==
- The World Unseen (2007)
- I Can't Think Straight (2008)
- Despite The Falling Snow (2013)
- Polarized (2023)

== Documentaries ==
- The House of Tomorrow (2011)

== Awards ==
- Best Feature, Audience Award - Miami Gay & Lesbian Film Festival 2009
- Best Feature - International Gay and Lesbian Film Festival Of Canary Islands, 2009
- Best Feature - Afterellen Visibility Awards
- Best Feature, Audience Award - Melbourne Queer Film Festival 2009
- Best Feature, Audience Award - Pink Apple 2009
- Audience Award Best Feature Film - Fairy Tales International Queer Diversity Film Festival (Calgary) 2009
- Jury Winner Best Feature Film - Festival Del Mar, Majorca 2009
- Audience Award, Best Feature - Vancouver Queer Film Festival 2009
- Best lesbian movie - The Holebifilmfestival Vlaams-Brabant 2009, Belgium
- Jury award for Best Women's Feature - Tampa International Gay & Lesbian Film Festival 2009
- Best Feature Film - Gay Film Nights International Film Festival 2009
