= I Can't Think Straight (novel) =

2008 novel by Shamim Sarif

- Author: Shamim Sarif
- Publisher: Enlightenment Productions Limited
- Publication date: November 11, 2008
- Media type: Print, E-book
- Pages: 218 pages
- ISBN: 0956031617

I Can't Think Straight is a 2008 novel by Shamim Sarif. Sarif directed a 2008 film of the same name. The novel and film are semi-autobiographical.

== Plot summary ==
Spirited Christian Tala and shy Muslim Leyla could not be more different, yet their attraction is immediate and goes deeper than friendship. Tala is not ready to accept the implications of her feelings and escapes back to Jordan, while Leyla tries to move on with her new life, much to the shock of her tradition-loving parents.

== Adaptations ==
Sarif successfully turned into an award-winning movie bearing the same title. The movie was produced by Hanan Kattan, Shamim's longtime partner and successful entrepreneur. The movie had as main characters Lisa Ray and Sheetal Sheth, who were protagonists also in one of Shamim's other artistic projects, The World Unseen.
