= Despite the Falling Snow =

2004 book by British Shamim Sarif

- Author: Shamim Sarif
- Publisher: Headline Book Publishing
- Publication date: May 4, 2004
- Media type: Print, ebook
- Pages: 341 pages
- ISBN: 0755308670

Despite the Falling Snow is a 2004 book by Shamim Sarif. It was first published on May 4, 2004, through Headline Book Publishing and is set during two different time periods. One part of the story is set in 1950s Moscow, Russia during the Cold War years, while the other follows the story of 1992 Moscow and London in the period after the collapse of USSR.

Critical reception for the novel was mostly positive, with The Bulletin praising it as a "mature romance". The Boston Globe also praised the novel, citing the character of Katya as a highlight.

== Plot summary ==
After an early career amongst the political elite of Cold War Russia, Alexander Ivanov has lived in America for forty years and has managed to bury the tragic memories surrounding his charismatic late wife, Katya – or so he believes.

Alexander's life changes when he meets two women, one of whom he forms a romantic relationship with, while the other investigates the events surrounding Katya of the past. Set in post-Stalin Moscow, the story centres on betrayals of the past and espionage.

== Film adaptation ==
A film adaptation of the novel was announced in early 2013 at the Cannes Festival. The film starring Mission: Impossible – Rogue Nation Swedish actress Rebecca Ferguson, Game of Thrones actor Charles Dance, Oliver Jackson-Cohen, Antje Traue, Sam Reid, Anthony Head, and Danish actor Thure Lindhardt was released in UK on April 15, 2016.

When the preview of Despite The Falling Snow the film appeared on YouTube a song performed by Ella Henderson called "Now You Say You Love Me" featured prominently toward the end. The film was directed by the author of the original book – Shamim Sharif. Hanan Kattan and Lisa Tchengiuz served as the Executive producers. The music was composed by Rachel Portman and the cinematography was by David Johnson.
