= The World Unseen (disambiguation) =

The World Unseen is a 2007 historical drama film by Shamim Sarif.

The World Unseen may also refer to:

- The World Unseen (novel), 2008 novel by Sarif based on the film
- The World Unseen (album), 2016 album by Mamiffer
