= Hanan Kattan =

British film producer

- Born: Hanan Fuad Tewfic Kattan; May 12, 1962 (age 64)
- Occupation: Film producer
- Spouse: Shamim Sarif
- Children: 2
- Website: http://hanankattan.com/

Hanan Fuad Tewfic Kattan (born 22 May 1962) is a Palestinian-born, British-based film producer of Palestinian origin. She is also co-owner of multi-media entertainment company Enlightenment Productions.

Kattan created Enlightenment Productions in partnership with filmmaker/author Shamim Sarif.

Enlightenment Productions were Winner of the Kingston Business Excellence Awards 2014, Best Creative and Media Sector Business.

== Early life ==
Kattan is a film producer, and author. Her mother was a Nakba-survivor, ethnically-cleansed from West Jerusalem in 1948. Her father’s family is from Bethlehem. Hanan grew up crossing the Allenby Bridge under Israeli military interrogation as a child.

== Career ==
Hanan published Palestine Revealed, a book born from the convergence of lived experience, rigorous research, and an urgent desire to share her people’s history with the world. She is also an award-winning feature film producer and podcaster, whose The Enlightenment Podcast discusses Palestine with historians, authors, medics, politicians, and artists from Palestine and around the world. More information about Palestine Revealed, including the charities it supports, can be found at palestinerevealed.com, with updates also available through its social media channels.

Hanan completed her fifth feature, Polarized, shot in Manitoba. Her feature release, Despite the Falling Snow, is the recipient of 13 awards and stars Rebecca Ferguson (Mission Impossible) and Charles Dance.

Kattan has produced three feature films through Enlightenment Productions including 1950s South African drama/love story The World Unseen and Hanan's first feature film contemporary urban romantic comedy I Can't Think Straight debuted at Palm Springs Festival and won 11 awards. The World Unseen had its debut at Toronto Film Festival before going on to garner 23 awards internationally. Her 2011 feature documentary and directorial debut, The House of Tomorrow, was inspired by the TEDx HolyLand conference that Hanan co-curated in Jerusalem.

Hanan is a member of BAFTA and Women in Film. She was selected for the TIFF Producers Lab and has spoken on panels at conferences such as DLD Women as well as at BAFTA and the BFI. She has also raised money for causes including the Nelson Mandela Children's Fund.

Hanan is a voting member of BAFTA and a member of the CMPA (Canadian Media Producers Association).

=== Palestine Revealed ===
Palestine Revealed is a fast-paced, non-fiction narrative uncovering a century of global geopolitical conspiracy, tracing how Palestinians were intentionally dispossessed. The book reveals how lies were written into scripture, U.N. votes were bought behind closed doors, villages were mapped before they were erased, and silence was manufactured to make it all seem inevitable.

=== Despite the Falling Snow ===
At Cannes Festival 2013, Shamim Sarif and Hanan announced their new film Despite the Falling Snow. The film starring Mission Impossible 5 Swedish actress Rebecca Ferguson, Game of Thrones actor Charles Dance, Oliver Jackson-Cohen, Antje Traue, Sam Reid, Anthony Head and Trudie Styler, which was released in 2015.

The film has won 13 awards, 3 at the Prague International Film Festival 3 more at the Milan International Film Festival and others at Los Angeles, Manchester, Sedona, Buffalo, Soho and Orlando Film Festivals.

Kattan published her first book Grow Your Profits about online marketing in 2012 through Enlightenment Productions.

In 2013, Kattan won Entrepreneur of the Year award at the Kingston Business Awards.

In 2016, Kattan opened her Palestinian restaurant Tabun Kitchen in Soho, London.

== Filmography ==
- I Can't Think Straight (2008)
- The World Unseen (2008)
- The House of Tomorrow (2011)
- Despite the Falling Snow (2015)
- Polarized (2023)

== Personal life ==
After nearly 20 years, Kattan married the writer and director Shamim Sarif in 2015. They live in Wimbledon with their two sons.
