= Peder Falk =

Swedish actor (1947–2024)

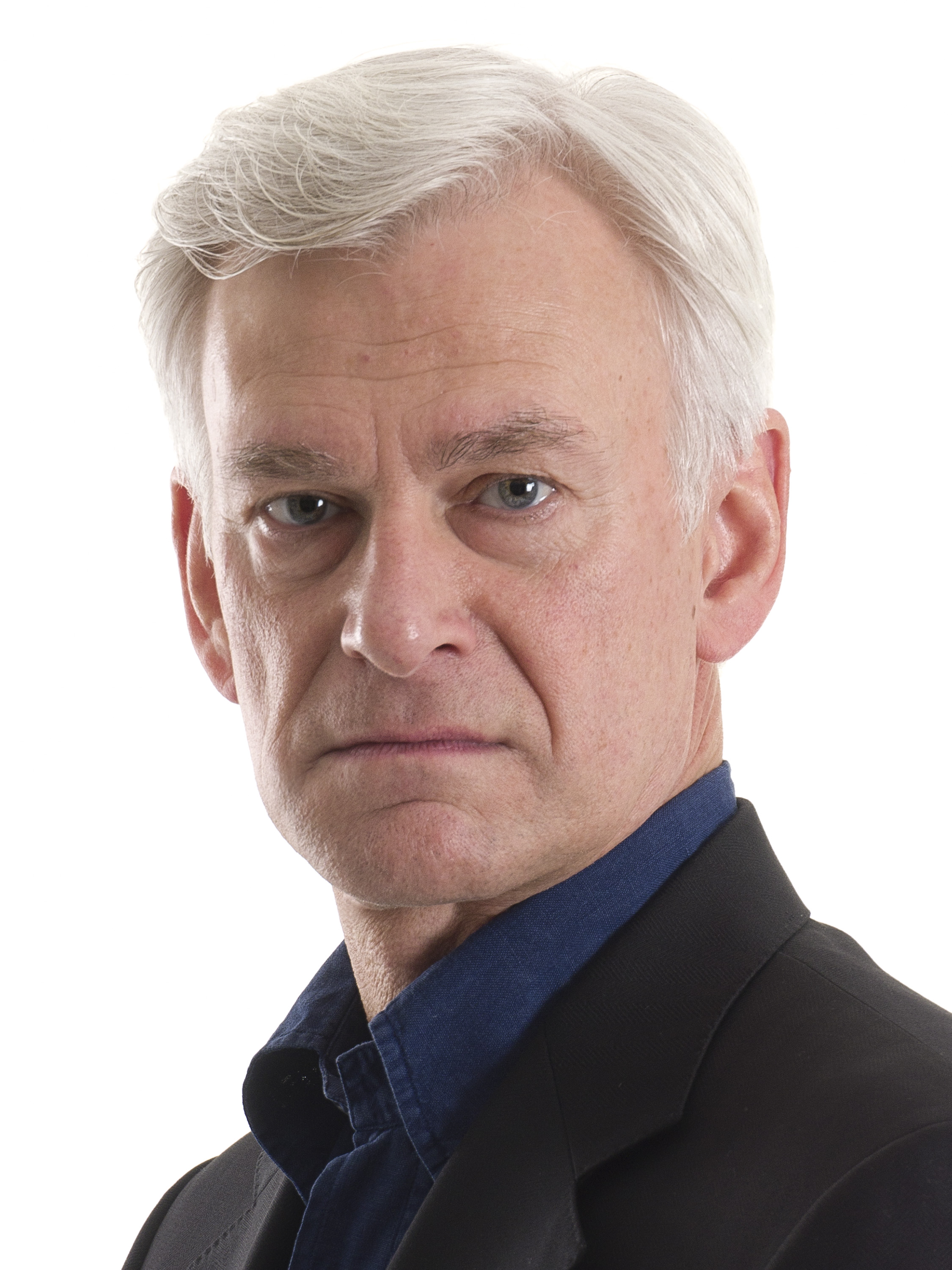
- Falk in 2011
- Born: 20 September 1947; Hässleholm, Sweden
- Died: 19 May 2024 (aged 76); Stockholm, Sweden
- Occupations: Actor, director

Jan-Peder Falk (20 September 1947 – 19 May 2024) was a Swedish actor, screenwriter and director. He spent most of his career at Stockholm's stadsteater and was also involved in improvisational theatre. On television, he was most known for his role as Carl Gripenhielm in the soap opera Nya tider.

== Career ==
After studying at Malmö Theatre Academy between 1969 and 1973, Falk worked in children's theater in Norrköping. In 1973, he started working for Stockholm's stadsteater, where his first role was in IK Kamraterna, a play about football. At times, he also worked for Klara Soppteater and Vetenskapsteatern.

In the mid 1980s, Falk along with Helge Skoog brought improvisational theatre to Stockholm's stadsteater. Falk also worked on improvisational theatre in other media, such as being a panel member in the Sveriges Radio show På minuten.

In the late 1980s, he began acting in television series and films. He made his début in Svart gryning, a film on the disappearance and murder of Dagmar Hagelin. He later acted in various television series, such as Fiendens fiende, Goltuppen and Nya tider. Falk became well known for his role as cabinet secretary Peter Sorman in the show Fiendens fiende. He was also noted for playing the character "Carl Gripenhielm", the father of actress Rebecca Ferguson's lead character "Anna Gripenhielm", for 435 episodes in the soap opera Nya tider, which was broadcast on TV4.

Beginning in the early 1990s, he wrote several plays and directed revue shows as well as plays.

== Personal life ==
Peder Falk was born on 20 September 1947 in Hässleholm. While studying in Umeå during the late 1960s, he worked as a reporter for the local newspaper, Västerbottens Folkblad.

Falk died on 19 May 2024, at the age of 76. His death was announced by his workplace Kulturhuset Stadshuset on 24 May.
