= På minuten =

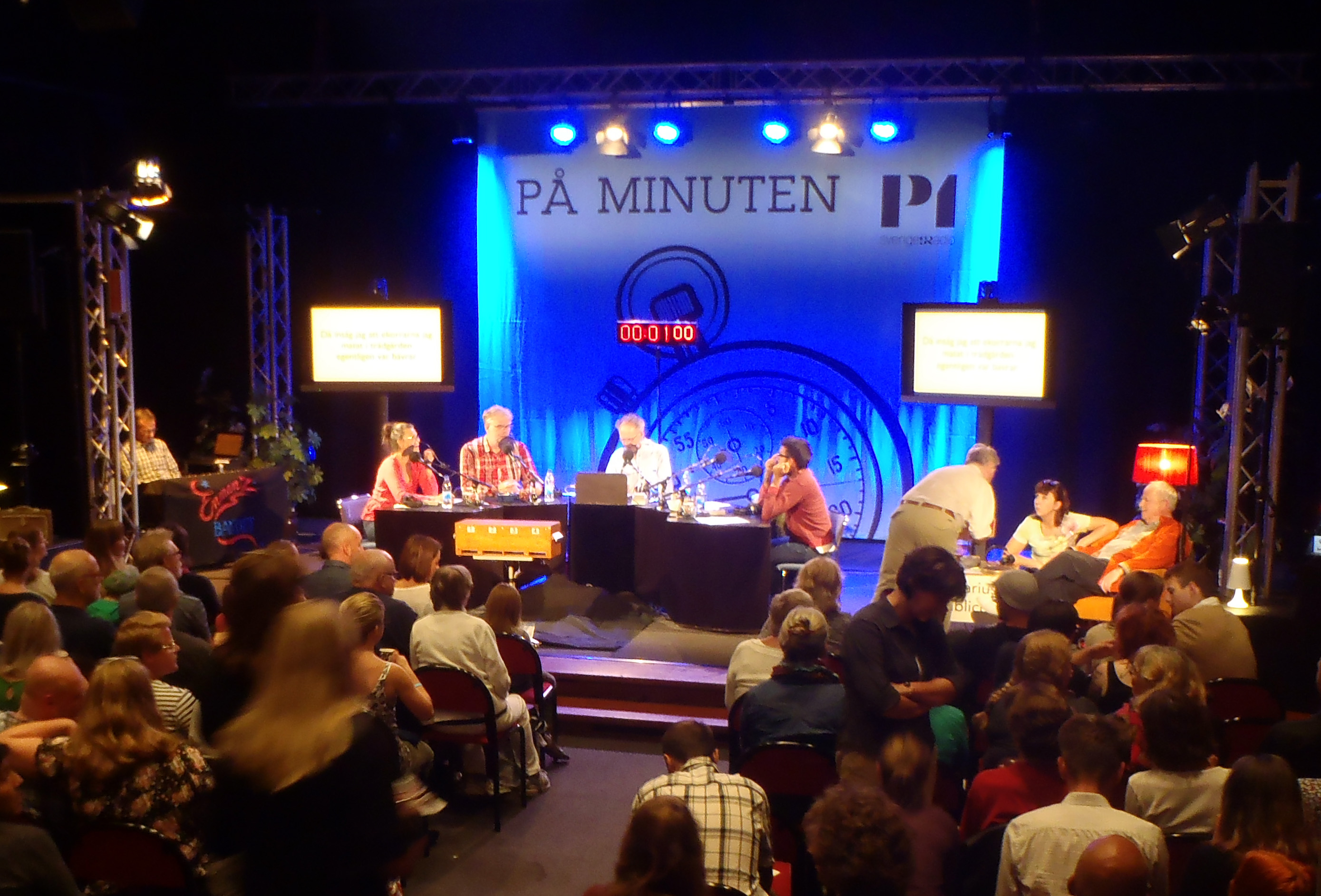
- Genre: Panel game
- Running time: 30 minutes
- Country of origin: Sweden
- Language: Swedish
- Home station: P1
- TV adaptations: På minuten 1975
- Hosted by: Herbert Söderström 1969; Lennart Swahn 1969 - 1988; Erik Blix 1994 - 1995; Ingvar Storm 1995 - 2017; Hans Rosenfeldt 2018 - present
- Starring: Regular panelists (1969-1988); Catrin Westerlund; Moltas Eriksson; Stig Järrel; Olle Pahlin; Margaretha Krook; Reserve panelists (1969-1988); Carl-Gustaf Lindstedt; Åke Strömmer; Hasse Alfredson Panelists (1995-present); Maja Aase; Fredrik Lindström; Carina Lidbom; Ulf Larsson; Hans Rosenfeldt; Kajsa Ingemarsson; Pia Johansson; David Batra; Dan Ekborg; Adde Malmberg; Peder Falk; Peter Settman; My Holmsten; Maria Möller; Babben Larsson Election Special (2006); Ylva Johansson (S); Peter Eriksson (MP); Lars Ohly (V); Göran Hägglund(KD) Election Special (2010) Leif Pagrotsky (S); Peter Eriksson (MP); Lars Ohly (V); Göran Hägglund (KD)
- Produced by: Ursula Richter 1969 - 1988; Ingvar Storm 1995 - ? Conny Sandberg ? - 2004; Bibi Rödöö 2004 - present
- Recording studio: Sveriges Radio's studio 4 Stockholm City Theatre's Soppteaterscen
- Original release: 18 February 1969 – Present
- Opening theme: Jones Polka by Spike Jones
- Website: På Minuten.se
- Podcast: På Minuten Podcast

På minuten (English lit.: On the minute meaning "within the confines of a minute") is a Swedish radio panel game similar to the BBC's Just a Minute. Recorded before a live audience, it is broadcast on Sveriges Radio P1 on Saturdays at 16.03, with a repeat the following day at 18.00. The recordings are made at Sveriges Radio, or sometimes at Stockholm City Theatre's Soppteater (café-theatre).

== History ==
På minuten was first broadcast on 18 February 1969. It was the Swedish version of the BBC's Just a Minute that had started two years earlier. It was first broadcast from Malmö with Herbert Söderström as host and Ulla Akselson, Agneta Prytz, Lasse Holmqvist, and Per-Henry Richter as panelists.

On 15 April 1969, production was moved to Stockholm, Ursula Richter was made producer, and Lennart Swahn took over as host. The panel originally consisted of Catrin Westerlund, Moltas Eriksson, Stig Järrel, and Olle Pahlin but it soon switched to the classic group of Margaretha Krook, Catrin Westerlund, Moltas Eriksson, and Stig Järrel. Some of the reserve panelists were Carl-Gustaf Lindstedt, Åke Strömmer, and Hasse Alfredson. Hasse Alfredson was later made a regular member of the panel after Catrin Westerlund died in 1982.

Between 5 April and 14 June 1975 six programs were made for television, as a part of the program Nöjeshallen.

After a six-year gap from 1988, the program was brought back by Erik Blix in 1994 with the title 60 sekunder (English: 60 seconds), before Ingvar Storm took over as the host in 1995 and changed the name back to På minuten. His first panel was made up of Maja Aase, Fredrik Lindström, Carina Lidbom, and Ulf Larsson. At the start, Ingvar Storm was also the producer of the show, but after some time Conny Sandberg took over that role.

== The program ==
The program takes the form of a competition where the panel members, in turn, try to talk about a certain subject for a whole minute without breaking certain rules (detailed below). If the opponents think they have heard something that goes against the rules they interrupt with an audible signal. The host then determines if the challenge will be accepted or rejected. If the challenge is rejected, the interrupted contestant gets one point and carries on. If the challenge is accepted the one who interrupted gets one point and the chance to speak for the rest of the minute. If there is uncertainty about whether or not one of the rules has been broken, the host can refer the matter to "the People's Court", i.e. the audience. First the host asks if the challenger should get the point, and after that asks the same thing regarding the interrupted contestant. The audience members answer by shouting "Yea!" when the host names the contestant that they agree with. The panelist who receives the strongest acclamation gets the chance to speak for the rest of the minute.

At the end of the program the panelist with the highest score is announced as the winner. The prize is often something edible.

=== Rules ===
There are three ground rules which the contestants must obey:

- No hesitation.
- No repetition.
- No deviation.

Removed rule:

- No factual errors.

Rules that have been added later:

- No leaving the premises. (Jokingly added by Lennart Swahn)
- No stealing anyone's approach to the subject.
- No snickering or laughing on your turn.

A combination of hesitation and deviation was introduced by Moltas Eriksson as "homoeopathic dilution": a term originally from the field of homeopathy but used here to signify a long, meaningless string of words – what Hans Rosenfeldt usually refers to as "a stacking of words without any meaning within itself".

=== Scoring ===
- 1 point is given if a contestant challenges another contestant successfully or if a contestant is incorrectly challenged.
- 2 points are given if a contestant manages to end the minute.
- 3 points are given if a contestant manages to speak for the whole minute without being interrupted.

=== Notarius Publicus ===
The functions of the "Notarius Publicus" are scorekeeping, timekeeping, banging the gong when the minute is up, and announcing the winner. Helge Skoog has performed this role since early 2012. His predecessor was the producer Bibi Rödöö who had held the role from 2004. The scorekeeper's title was changed from "Chief Justice" (Överdomaren) when Skoog took over from Rödöö. The title Notarius Publicus is the Latin for Notary public; however, the similarities, if any, are slim in this program.

=== Prizes ===
Until Bibi Röddö joined in 2004, prizes had not been a part of På Minuten. The first prizes were tin cans containing exotic food. Some of them were so exotic that contestants did their utmost to let someone else win. After Bibi Rödöö had gone through most of what Stockholm had to offer in tin cans she started to bring home prizes from her travels. After this the audience started to bring prizes of their own. These usually included local specialities like truffles from Gotland, chanterelles from Ludvika, or fruitloaf with homemade marmalade. Later listeners abroad started sending in prizes such as avocado crème from Israel, grasshopper lollipops from the United States, Arctic char from Canada, and a meal for two from a Japanese arctic research station.

Foods are not the only prizes offered. Sometimes there are musical teachers who offer their services under the motto "Learn how to play an instrument under an hour". Contestants are not allowed to choose which instrument they will learn to play, as this is decided before recording of the show begins. The winner usually plays or attempts to play a small musical piece with the aforementioned instrument at the beginning of the following edition of the program.

== Differences from Just a Minute ==
The Swedish program has a slightly different interpretation of the rules compared to the British version.

- In Just a Minute contestants are allowed to repeat words included in the subject. If the subject includes, say, the word "apple", then contestants can say "apple" as many times as they wish. In På minuten a contestant is allowed to say a word only once before he or she is interrupted or finishes the minute, regardless of whether or not the word is in the subject.
- In Just a Minute contestants are not allowed to repeat a word at any time during the whole minute, whereas in På minuten they are allowed to use a word one more time following an interruption.
- In Just a Minute the rule on deviation from the subject is interpreted more strictly than in På minuten. Just a Minute often does not allow deviation from the truth, logic, or grammar.
- The rule "No stealing anyone's approach to the subject" does not exist in Just a Minute.
