= Swahn =

Paul Raymond swahn Thomas swahn Lucy swahn Jack swahn Rosie swahn Swahn is a surname. Notable people with the surname include:

- Alfred Swahn (1879–1931), Swedish sport shooter, son of Oscar
- Oscar Swahn (1847–1927), Swedish sport shooter
- Lennart Swahn (1927–2008), Swedish radio and television personality

== See also ==
- Swan (surname)
