= Despite the Falling Snow (film) =

2016 British Cold War espionage film by Shamim Sarif

- Directed by: Shamim Sarif
- Screenplay by: Shamim Sarif
- Based on: Despite the Falling Snow by Shamim Sarif
- Produced by: Hanan Kattan
- Starring: Rebecca Ferguson; Sam Reid; Charles Dance; Antje Traue; Oliver Jackson-Cohen; Thure Lindhardt; Anthony Head
- Cinematography: David Johnson
- Edited by: Masahiro Hirakubo
- Music by: Rachel Portman
- Production company: Enlightenment Productions
- Distributed by: Altitude Film Distribution
- Release date: 15 April 2016
- Running time: 93 minutes
- Countries: UK, Canada
- Language: English

Despite the Falling Snow is a 2016 British Cold War espionage film directed by Shamim Sarif, adapted from her novel of the same name. Starring Rebecca Ferguson, Sam Reid, Charles Dance, Antje Traue, Oliver Jackson-Cohen, Thure Lindhardt and Anthony Head, the film was released in the United Kingdom on 15 April 2016.

== Plot ==
The film weaves together two stories set 30 years apart: one set in the post-Stalinist Soviet Union, and one from post-Soviet Russia in the early 1990s.

A young Soviet woman, Katya, lost her parents during the Great Purge. Though she pretends to be a communist, she hates the regime and spies for the Americans. Her friend Misha is also a spy, and helps her obtain important information for the Americans. As part of her next assignment, she meets the young and good-looking Sasha, who belongs to the Kremlin elite.

Misha persuades Katya to marry Sasha in order to continue spying on him. Katya is reluctant to deceive Sasha, but decides to go through with the marriage. Gradually Sasha realises that his work at the Kremlin is worthless, and decides to defect during an official trip to the US.

Sasha becomes a successful businessman in America, but never learns what happened to Katya after he defected. His niece Lauren is an artist who is invited to exhibit in Moscow in the early 1990s, where she meets Marina, a journalist. Marina helps Lauren research Katya's story, and they find Misha, who is now an alcoholic. Sasha decides to return to Moscow, and is reunited with Misha in Lauren's gallery. Misha tells them what happened to Katya thirty years ago.

== Cast ==
- Rebecca Ferguson as Katya Grinkova / Lauren Grinkova
- Sam Reid as Alexander "Sasha" Ivanov (young)
- Charles Dance as Alexander "Sasha" Ivanov (older)
- Antje Traue as Marina Rinskaya
- Oliver Jackson-Cohen as Mikhail "Misha" Ardonov (young)
- Thure Lindhardt as Dmitri Rinsky
- Miloš Timotijević as First Man
- Anthony Head as Mikhail "Misha" Ardonov (older)

== Production ==
The film was shot in Belgrade, Serbia. The score by Rachel Portman was performed by the City of Prague Philharmonic Orchestra.

== Reception ==
On the review aggregator website Rotten Tomatoes, the film holds a 9% approval rating based on 22 reviews, with an average rating of 4.1/10. The website's consensus reads, "Despite the Falling Snow's slick production and appealing cast struggle to elevate a feeble script, resulting in a Cold War thriller that never raises the temperature."

The film won three awards at the 2016 Prague Independent Film Festival including Best Feature Film, Best Actress (Rebecca Ferguson) and Best Supporting Actor (Anthony Head).
