= Finding Her Edge =

2026 Canadian television series

- Release poster
- Genre: Sports; Romance; Teen drama
- Based on: Finding Her Edge by Jennifer Iacopelli
- Developed by: Shelley Scarrow; Jeff Norton
- Directed by: Shamim Sarif; Jacqueline Pepall
- Starring: Madelyn Keys; Cale Ambrozic; Olly Atkins
- Composer: Nikhil Seetharam
- Country of origin: Canada
- Original language: English
- No. of seasons: 1
- No. of episodes: 8

Production
- Executive producers: Jeff Norton; Josh Scherba; Stephanie Betts; Angela Boudreault
- Production company: WildBrain

Original release
- Network: Netflix
- Release: 22 January 2026 – present

Finding Her Edge is a Canadian sports teen drama television series, adapted from the novel of the same name by Jennifer Iacopelli. It premiered worldwide on Netflix on 22 January 2026. On 3 February 2026, it was renewed for a second season.

== Premise ==
Adrianna, a competitive ice skater from a dynastic family, seemingly has a budding romance with her new on-ice partner (Brayden), but her feelings are complicated by her former ice partner Freddie, also her ex-boyfriend, and his new partner. Her older sister, an individual competitor, faces challenges of her own, while her younger sister is trying to find her true self. Meanwhile, the sisters' widower father experiences financial difficulties in keeping the family enterprise afloat.

== Cast ==
- Madelyn Keys as Adriana Russo
- Cale Ambrozic as Brayden Elliott
- Olly Atkins as Freddie O'Connell
- Alexandra Beaton as Elise Russo
- Alice Malakhov as Maria Russo
- Niko Ceci as Charlie Monroe
- Millie Davis as Riley Monroe
- Harmon Walsh as Will Russo
- Meredith Forlenza as Camille St. Denis
- Yona Epstein-Roth as JJ Harmon
- Nicole Volossetski as Katya Belikova
- Sean Chen as Ben Woo
- Aidan Shaw as Weston Scannell
- Celia Owen as Sarah Russo'
- Kimberly-Sue Murray as Michelle Scannel
- Bert Cardozo as Michael

Five-time Canadian figure skating champions Piper Gilles and Paul Poirier appear as themselves in episode 5. British figure skating champions Lilah Fear and Lewis Gibson voiced a duo of television commentators. Author Jennifer Iacopelli makes a brief appearance as a librarian in episode 7.

=== Skating doubles ===
Canadian Junior champions and World Junior bronze medalists Nadiia Bashynska and Peter Beaumont served as skating doubles for the roles of Adriana and Brayden. Several other Canadian junior athletes served as skating doubles including: Rachel Martins and Natasha Hewitt for Adriana's sisters Maria and Elise, Aria Murrell and Nicholas Buelow for Adriana's training mates Riley and Freddie, and Lauren Audrey Batkova and Jacob Yang for Adriana's competitors Destiny and Sean.

== Episodes ==
No.	Title	Directed by	Written by	Original release date
1	"Pushing Off"	Shamim Sarif	Shelley Scarrow	January 22, 2026
2	"Shoot the Duck"	Shamim Sarif	Shelley Scarrow	January 22, 2026
3	"Inside Edge"	Jacqueline Pepall	Sabrina Sherif	January 22, 2026
4	"Kiss and Cry"	Jacqueline Pepall	Jacqueline Pepall	January 22, 2026
5	"Spiraling"	Shamim Sarif	Jeff Norton	January 22, 2026
6	"Crossovers"	Shamim Sarif	Sabrina Sherif	January 22, 2026
7	"Death Spiral"	Jacqueline Pepall	Jacqueline Pepall	January 22, 2026
8	"Medaling"	Shamim Sarif	Shelley Scarrow	January 22, 2026

== Production ==
The eight-part series is adapted from the young adult novel of the same name by Jennifer Iacopelli. The story is also loosely based on Jane Austen's novel Persuasion. The series is directed by Shamim Sarif and Jacqueline Pepall. Shelley Scarrow was head writer alongside Sabrina Sherif, Jacqueline Pepall, and Jeff Norton. Norton is showrunner and executive producer on the series, alongside Josh Scherba, Stephanie Betts, and Angela Boudreault for WildBrain.

The cast is led by Madelyn Keys and Cale Ambrozic with Olly Atkins, Alexandra Beaton, Millie Davis, Harmon Walsh and Alice Malakhov.

The series was filmed in Ontario, Canada, with filming locations including Orillia, Barrie and Wasaga Beach. Skating director was Brad Hopkins.

Filming for the second season began in late August 2026.

== Release ==
The series was originally slated to air in Canada on Family, but after that service was closed in 2025 it was picked up for distribution by Ici Radio-Canada Télé. The eight-part series was eventually released on Netflix on 22 January 2026.

== Reception ==
The series holds 100% approval rating on review aggregator Rotten Tomatoes, based on 11 critic reviews.
