= Wilderness (2023 TV series) =

British thriller television series (2023)

- Genre: Crime drama; Psychological thriller
- Created by: Marnie Dickens
- Based on: Wilderness by B. E. Jones
- Written by: Marnie Dickens; Matilda Feyiṣayọ Ibini
- Directed by: So Yong Kim
- Starring: Jenna Coleman; Oliver Jackson-Cohen; Ashley Benson
- Narrated by: Jenna Coleman
- Country of origin: United Kingdom
- Original language: English
- No. of episodes: 6

Production
- Executive producers: Elizabeth Kilgarriff; Marnie Dickens; So Yong Kim; Craig Holleworth
- Running time: 42-58 minutes
- Production companies: Firebird Pictures; Amazon Studios

Original release
- Network: Amazon Prime Video
- Release: 15 September 2023

Wilderness is a British psychological thriller miniseries produced for Amazon Prime Video based on the novel of the same name by B. E. Jones. It stars Jenna Coleman, Oliver Jackson-Cohen and Ashley Benson. It was released on 15 September 2023.

== Synopsis ==
Liv and Will seem to have it all. A rock-solid marriage. A glamorous new life in New York. Until Liv learns about the affair. Enter the American road trip she's fantasised about. For Will, it's a chance to make amends, for Liv it's a very different prospect - a landscape where accidents happen all the time. The perfect place to get revenge.

== Cast ==
- Jenna Coleman as Liv Taylor
- Oliver Jackson-Cohen as Will Taylor
- Ashley Benson as Cara Parker
- Morgana Van Peebles as Ash
- Claire Rushbrook as Caryl
- Talia Balsam as Bonnie
- Eric Balfour as Garth
- Marsha Stephanie Blake as Detective Rawlings
- Jonathan Keltz as Detective Wiseman

== Episodes ==
| No. | Title | Directed by | Written by | Original release date |
|---|---|---|---|---|
| 1 | "Happily Ever After" | So Yong Kim | Marnie Dickens | September 15, 2023 |
Married couple Liv and Will Taylor live together in New York City. On Christmas, Liv learns that Will cheated on her; he insists it only happened once, but she kicks him out of their apartment. He later returns and attempts to make it up to her by taking her on a road trip out West, to which Liv reluctantly agrees. In May, they travel out to Yosemite National Park, where they reach the top of a cliff to take a selfie. As Will looks out, Liv nearly attempts to kill him by pushing him off the cliff, but a passerby inadvertently distracts them both before she can do so. They drive to their hotel as Liv considers other ways to get revenge on Will. A flash-forward shows her looking down at an unidentified headstone.
| 2 | "The Other Woman" | So Yong Kim | Marnie Dickens | September 15, 2023 |
Three weeks prior to their trip, Liv learns of an extended affair between Will and his coworker Cara Parker, including a video where he says he would leave Liv for her. Liv secretly follows Cara around New York for an entire day, even intercepting Will at night just before he and Cara can meet up, but does not reveal to Will that she knows about the affair. On their trip, Liv and Will find Cara and her boyfriend Garth at the same hiking trail. The four of them go on a hike, as Will and Cara spend some time together separate from the other two. When they return from their hike, Liv and Will find their car stolen and get a ride back to the hotel with Cara and Garth. A tense evening between the four of them turns into an intense fight between Liv and Will back in their room. Liv wakes up alone in her room in the middle of the night to see a text on Will's phone from Cara telling him to meet near at the waterfall so they can run away together. Liv goes there, sees a person alone in Will's red poncho, and angrily pushes them off the waterfall.
| 3 | "Repent At Leisure" | So Yong Kim | Marnie Dickens | September 15, 2023 |
Liv wakes up the next morning believing she has killed Will, only to see him show up back at the room. The two appear to reconcile and are about to check out from the hotel when they see Garth looking for Cara; all three of them are unable to contact her via cell, and it becomes clear to Liv that Cara is the one who she pushed the night before. Park rangers search for her and find her, barely alive. They transport her to a hospital, where Liv and Will visit while Garth waits with her. Later, Liv goes for a run, but overhears Garth nearby saying that Cara is dead; she breaks down. As police speak with all of the hotel guests to gather information, Will comes clean to Liv about the affair but insists he would never leave her for Cara. He asks Liv to back up his alibi, which she begrudgingly does to the police, who believe that Cara slipped in the storm and fell to her death by misadventure.
| 4 | "Home Sweet Home" | So Yong Kim | Marnie Dickens & Matilda Feyiṣayọ Ibini | September 15, 2023 |
Liv and Will go to Las Vegas, but Liv remains unhappy with him. She goes off on her own at night and has multiple hallucinations of Cara. Upon arriving back in New York, the couple begin erasing all evidence of Will and Cara's affair, including visiting Garth at his home in order to retrieve a key to their apartment that Will had given Cara. The police begin investigating Cara's death as murder and interview Liv and Will separately, and are suspicious of how well their stories line up. Detectives Rawlings and Wiseman obtain footage from Cara's gym that shows Liv there on the night she was following Cara, leading them to know she is lying about not having known Cara prior to their trip. Liv answers a knock at her door to find her mother having traveled in from Wales. At the same time, Garth is arrested for Cara's murder.
| 5 | "Like Mother, Like Daughter" | So Yong Kim | Marnie Dickens | September 15, 2023 |
Detectives Rawlings and Wiseman show Garth evidence suggesting Cara was going to run away and claim that he killed her when he realized she did not want to be with him. From jail, Garth calls Liv asking if Cara revealed anything to her, but Liv does not respond and later calls in an anonymous tip that leads police to Garth's engagement ring. He confesses to being angry after Cara turned down his proposal but denies killing her and is released from jail for lack of evidence. Meanwhile, Liv's mom raids their apartment while Liv and Will are out at dinner and finds proof of Will's affair. She threatens to bring it to the police if Liv does not leave Will and go back to Wales with her, but relents when Liv confesses to her that she killed Cara. Liv looks at the evidence and realizes that Will was cheating with another woman, not just Cara. As she confronts Will about this back at their apartment, Garth shows up there with a gun and threatens Liv, forcing Will to come clean to him about the affair. Garth strangles Liv, but she grabs a rock on the ground and smashes his skull, killing him.
| 6 | "Where White Knights Go To Die" | So Yong Kim | Marnie Dickens | September 15, 2023 |
Liv is released after police declare Garth's death a criminally negligent homicide. Liv tells Will she wants a divorce, then has sex with her female neighbor Ash. Will plans to quit his job and move with Liv back to the UK, and threatens to tell the police that Liv's killing of Garth was not self-defense if she leaves him. At JFK Airport on their way to leave the country, police detain the couple and show them a video (sent anonymously by Liv) of Will and Cara sleeping together; Liv feigns shock as Will is arrested for suspicion of murder. Liv eventually cooperates with the detectives without implicating herself, and Will goes to prison after he admits that the poncho that Cara was wearing when she was killed was his. Before Liv leaves the police station, Detective Rawlings implies to her that she knows what really happened. Three months later, Will asks Liv to visit him in prison, where he tells her he knows that she killed Cara. Liv initially denies this, but when he asks her why she did it, she says it was because she thought Cara was Will. Liv finishes writing a novel about the experience called Wilderness, then goes back to Yosemite on her own and stands at the spot where she killed Cara.

== Production ==
The series was adapted for television by Marnie Dickens, based upon the 2017 novel Wilderness by B.E. Jones. Director So Yong Kim executive produced alongside Dickens and Elizabeth Kilgarriff for Firebird Pictures.

Filmed primarily in Vancouver, production began in April 2022, with filming also scheduled for Calgary, the Banff Springs Hotel, and moving in September to Las Vegas, the Grand Canyon, and New York; additional filming took place in the UK.

Jenna Coleman and Oliver Jackson-Cohen were announced as the series leads in June 2022. In July 2022, Ashley Benson, Eric Balfour, Marsha Stephanie Blake and Morgana Van Peebles were announced as added to the cast.

== Release ==
A trailer was released on 23 August 2023, featuring the new re-recorded version of Taylor Swift's "Look What You Made Me Do". The song also plays over the opening credits.

The series premiered on 15 September 2023 on Prime Video.

== Reception ==
Wilderness received mixed reviews and scored 66% on Rotten Tomatoes who said 'Wilderness often gets lost in its overabundance of revenge tropes, but its cutting twists may satisfy fans of sordid intrigue.' The show was criticized for its overreliance on tropes.
