= Catherine Texier =

American journalist

Catherine Texier, novelist, journalist, and creative writing professor, was born and raised in France and now lives in New York City. She is the author of four novels, Victorine (2004), Chloé l'Atlantique (1983), Love Me Tender (1987) and Panic Blood (1990), and a memoir, Breakup (1999). She was the coeditor of the literary magazine Between C & D, is a regular contributor to The New York Times, and has written for Newsday, ELLE, Harper's Bazaar, Cosmopolitan, Marie Claire, and Nerve.com. She also edited the anthologies Between C and D: New Writing from the Lower East Side Fiction Magazine (1988) and Love is Strange: Tales of Postmodern Romance (1993), both with former spouse Joel Rose.

The translator of several books, she is a recipient of two New York Foundation for the Arts Fellowships and a National Endowment for the Arts Award, her work has been translated into ten languages.

== Partial bibliography ==
- Chloé l'Atlantique (1983)
- Love Me Tender (1987)
- Panic Blood (1990)
- Breakup (1998)
- Victorine (2004)
- Foreword to Sex and Isolation And Other Essays by Bruce Benderson (2007, University of Wisconsin Press)
- After David (2024)
