= The World Unseen (novel) =

2008 novel written by Shamim Sarif

- Author: Shamim Sarif
- Publisher: The Women's Press
- Publication date: 2001
- Pages: 322 pages
- ISBN: 0704347121

The World Unseen is a 2001 novel written by Shamim Sarif.

The movie with the same title made its debut in 2007 at the Toronto International Film Festival. The film featured Sheetal Sheth and Lisa Ray as the protagonists. The actresses have collaborated with the award-winning author for another motion picture, an adaptation of Shamim's novel I Can't Think Straight.

== Plot summary ==
In 1950s South Africa, free-spirited Amina has broken all the rules of her own conventional Indian community and the recent apartheid system, by running a cafe with Jacob her “coloured” business partner. When she meets Miriam, a young wife and mother, their unexpected attraction pushes Miriam to question the rules that bind her. When Amina helps Miriam’s sister-in-law to hide from the police, a chain of events is set in motion that changes both women forever.
