= Kill Kill Faster Faster =

- DVD cover
- Directed by: Gareth Maxwell Roberts
- Screenplay by: Gareth Maxwell Roberts; Joel Rose
- Based on: Kill Kill Faster Faster (novel) by Joel Rose
- Produced by: Gil Bellows; Carlo Dusi; John Pantages; Gareth Maxwell Roberts
- Starring: Gil Bellows; Lisa Ray; Esai Morales; Shaun Parkes; Laurence Edney
- Cinematography: Ruzbeh Babol
- Edited by: Raimondo Aiello; Rachel Tunnard
- Music by: Mike Benn
- Production company: Aria Films
- Distributed by: Galloping Films; Kaleidoscope (UK)
- Release date: April 16, 2008 (London Independent Film Festival)
- Running time: 97 minutes
- Countries: United States; Netherlands

Kill Kill Faster Faster is a 2008 thriller film directed by Gareth Maxwell Roberts, with the screenplay an adaptation by Gareth Maxwell Roberts and Joel Rose of Rose's novel of the same name. The film stars Gil Bellows, Lisa Ray, Esai Morales, and Shaun Parkes, and premiered April 16, 2008, at the London Independent Film Festival. It had its DVD release on July 28, 2009, which was followed by screening at the Helsinki International Film Festival September 18, 2009.

== Background ==
The project is set in New York City and was filmed there and in Rotterdam, the Netherlands. The film follows the life of a former drug addict and murderer who is released from prison. Filming was completed July 2007. The film received attention due to former Bollywood actress Lisa Ray's several aesthetically shot nude scenes.

== Plot ==
Joe One-Way (Gil Bellows) is serving a life sentence for the jealousy murder of his teenage bride Kimba (Moneca Delain). At the urging of his cellmate Clinique (Shaun Parkes), he composes the play White Man: Black Hole about his crime. Joe had been incarcerated 18 years, before Hollywood agent Markie Mark (Esai Morales), who wishes to make a film of the play, arranges that Joe gets an early release from prison. Wanting to create a great deal of media buzz, he brings Joe into his office to rewrite the stage play in order to give it greater audience appeal. There, Joe meets Fleur (Lisa Ray), Markie's arm candy. Learning she had been a fan of his for some time, the two begin a torrid affair. Joe then searches for a way to reconcile the crime for which he had never forgiven himself.

== Partial cast ==
- Gil Bellows as Joey
- Lisa Ray as Fleur
- Esai Morales as Markie
- Shaun Parkes as Clinique
- Doña Croll as Birdie
- Moneca Delain as Kimba
- Stephen Lord as Jarvis
- Jane Peachey as Serena
- Saskia Troccoli as Sasha
- Viv Weatherall as Nicky Roman
- Liza Sips as Lolita
- Godwin Logye as Dobbins
- Jason Griffith as Cassius (uncredited)
- Laurence Edney as Braman

== Recognition ==
=== Critical response ===
Independent Film Reviews wrote that the film "had some real mixed reviews and not a lot of publicity." The anonymous reviewer noted that the film's use of a prison theme is one that has been used many times. He noted that while Shaun Parkes' role as Joey's cell mate was cliché, it was "enjoyable to watch", and also noted that Gil Bellows' performance was "very reminiscent of Mickey Rourke's character in Bullet". He granted that there were some scenes that provided nice, artistic visuals, but that they could not overcome drab writing "trying to be philosophical but coming off as dribble and out of place". The reviewer offered that if a viewer did not have high expectations, it might be worth renting, but wrote "overall the theme is predictable and the story pretty much tells its ending all throughout which gives the viewer a bit of a letdown."

TV Kult makes note that the film uses the device of frequent flashbacks to maintain tension and provide context without a need to overly develop the backstory, and through the performances of the supporting cast their characters are portrayed convincingly. The reviewer noted that while the scenes depicting Joe's 18 years of incarceration included sex and violence, they were contextually well integrated into the film without appearing overdone. While writing that the film was not great cinema, he noted that its strength lay with a story that holds a viewer's interest. In conclusion, it is "[e]in durchaus sehenswerter Film für alle Thrillerfans, die mehr Wert auf eine gute Story als auf Effekten und großen Namen legen," or "a very watchable film for all thriller fans who attach more importance to a good story than on effects and big names."

=== Awards and nominations ===
- 2008, won 'Best International Feature' at London Independent Film Festival
- 2008, won 'Best Editing in a HD Feature Film' at HD Fest
- 2008, 2nd place, 'Best High-Definition Feature' HD Fest
- 2008, won 'Best Independent Feature Film' at Charity Erotic Awards.

== DVD release ==
The DVD extras include the original trailer and a trailer show, a photo gallery with pictures from the movie and the filming, and a one-hour interview with the director Gareth Maxwell Roberts.
