= Shaun Parkes =

English actor (born 1973)

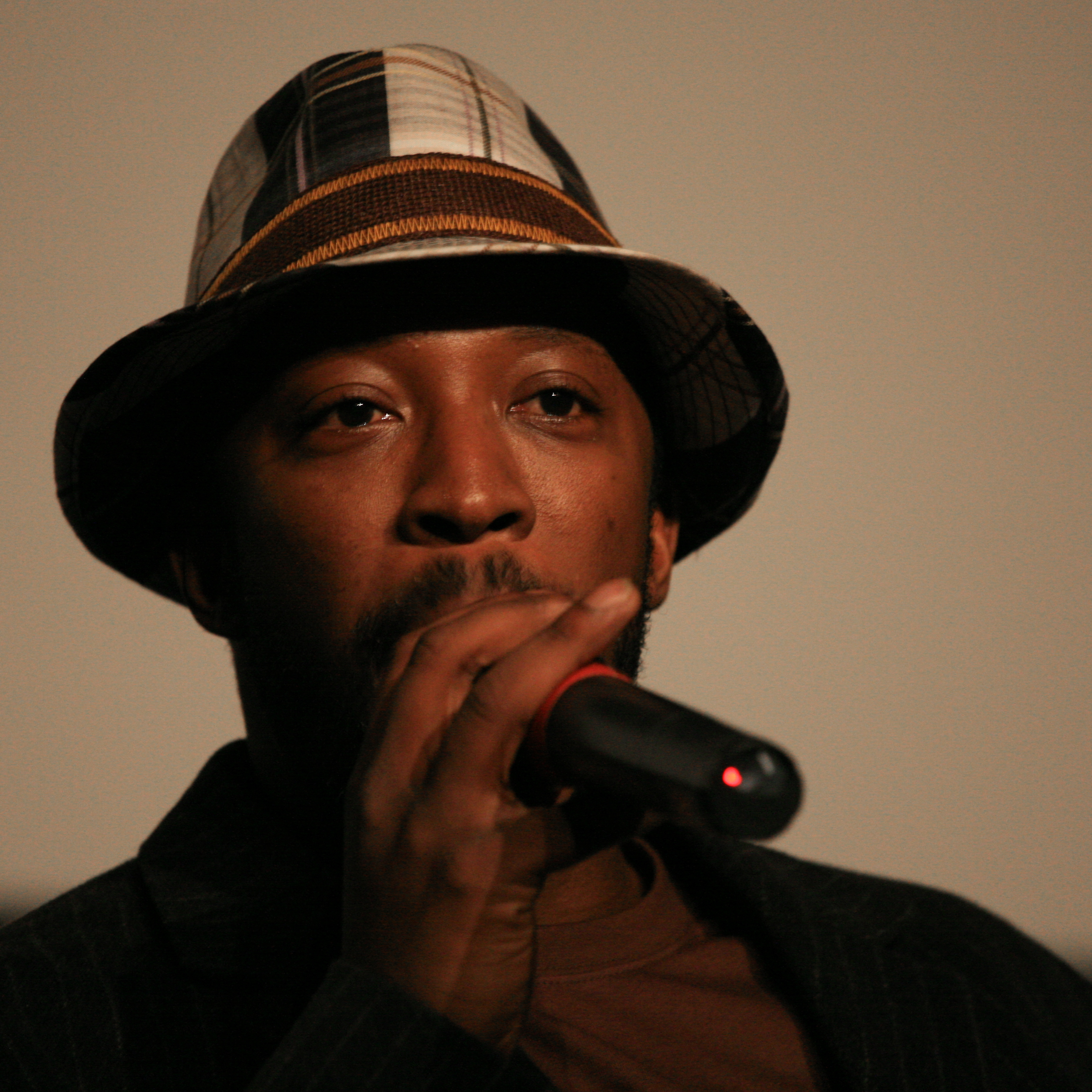
- Born: Shaun Parkes; 9 February 1973 (age 53); Croydon, London, England
- Occupation: Actor
- Years active: 1994–present

Shaun Parkes (born 9 February 1973) is an English television, theatre and film actor, who is best known for his film roles as Koop in Human Traffic, Izzy Buttons in The Mummy Returns (2001), and Frank Crichlow in Small Axe. For his role in Small Axe, he was nominated for a lead actor award at the 2021 British Academy Television Awards. He also played Doctor Charles Burleigh Purvis in the miniseries Death by Lightning.

== Biography ==
At the age of 16, Parkes enrolled at Seltec College to study drama. Two years later, he was accepted into the Royal Academy of Dramatic Art (RADA).

Having acted in both theatre and television support roles, Parkes made his breakthrough in the 1999 film Human Traffic. His work since then includes films such as Clubbed, The Mummy Returns, Things to Do Before You're 30 and the acclaimed Notes on a Scandal.

He is also well-known for his turn as Frank Crichlow, the owner of the Mangrove restaurant at the centre of Steve McQueen's film series Small Axe. For his role in the series, he was nominated for a lead actor award at the 2021 British Academy Television Awards.

Parkes's television work includes Lock, Stock..., Servants and Russell T. Davies's Casanova and Doctor Who. Parkes also starred as the lead in BBC Two's detective series Moses Jones, with a supporting cast that included Matt Smith. His most recent turns were as Detective Inspector Vince Ruiz in ITV's The Suspect, and Doctor Charles Burleigh Purvis in the Netflix historical drama miniseries, Death by Lightning.

Parkes also continues to forge a career as a theatre actor. He has starred alongside David Threlfall and Neil Stuke in Joe Penhall's award-winning play Blue/Orange in the West End and in Kwame Kwei-Armah's Elmina's Kitchen and at Shakespeare's Globe as Aaron in Titus Andronicus.

== Music ==
Since 2001, Shaun has been collaborating with the DJ production team AudioFly (Anthony Middleton and Luca Saporito). Together they have been working regularly on dance tracks featuring Parkes's vocals, and are planning to produce a new album.

== Filmography ==
=== Film ===
1996	Title	Erroll Jones	Notes
1999	Human Traffic	Koop	
1999	Rage	Godwin "G"	
2000	Offending Angels	Zeke	
2001	The Mummy Returns	Izzy	Sequel to The Mummy
2005	Things to Do Before You're 30	Adam	
2005	Colour Me Kubrick	Mental Patient 2	
2006	Penelope	Reporter Outside Hospital 2	
2006	Notes on a Scandal	Bill Rumer	
2008	Kill Kill Faster Faster	Clinique	
2008	Daylight Robbery	Yardie	
2008	Clubbed	Rob	
2015	Urban Hymn	Charlie	
2018	The Fight	Mick Bell	
2019	Trick or Treat	Clarence	
2020	The Black Emperor of Broadway	Charles Sidney Gilpin	
2024	The Radleys	Jared Copeleigh	

=== Television ===
Year	Title	Role	Notes
1994	Casualty	Patrick Senior	Episode: "A Breed Apart"
1994	Soldier Soldier	Clive Nelson	Episode: "Poles Apart"
1995	Crown Prosecutor	Eric Jackson	Main cast, all 10 episodes
1995	Degrees of Error	Mental hospital nurse	Episode 3
1995	The Bill	Derek Leno	Episode: "Bad Pictures"
1996	Heartbeat	Errol Jones	Episode: "Giving the Game Away"
1997	Turning World	Julian Roberts	
1999	Casualty	Grant Flock	Episode: "White Lies, White Wedding"
1999	Plastic Man	Adam Okoye	ITV
2000	Lock, Stock...	Bacon	Spin-off of the film Lock, Stock and Two Smoking Barrels
2001	Randall & Hopkirk (Deceased)	Charley Marshall	Episode: "Marshall and Snellgrove"
2004	Silent Witness	DI Freeman	Episode: "Body 21"
2005	Blue/Orange	Christopher	BBC 4
2005	Casanova	Rocco	BBC
2006	Doctor Who	Zachary Cross Flane	Episodes: "The Impossible Planet" & "The Satan Pit"
2006–2008	The Inspector Lynley Mysteries	DC Winston Nkata	Main cast, series 5 and 6
2007	Miss Marie Lloyd – Queen of The Music Hall	The Showman	BBC4
2008	Kiss of Death	Dr Clive Morrell	
2008	Harley Street	Dr. Ekkow Obiang	
2009	Moses Jones	Moses Jones	BBC2
2009	Small Island	Winston	BBC
2010	Chris Ryan's Strike Back	Felix Masuku	Sky 1 HD, Episode 3&4
2010	Identity	DS Anthony Wareing	ITV1
2011	No Ordinary Family	Frank Matthews	Episode: "No Ordinary Brother"
2012	Treasure Island	George Merry	
2012	The River	A.J. Poulain	ABC
2013	Death in Paradise	Paul Vincent	Episode: "Death in the Clinic"
2014	The Lost Honour of Christopher Jefferies	Paul Okebu	ITV 2-part series
2016	Silent Witness	Bennet Walker	Episode: "Life Licence"
2016	The Aliens	Truss	Mini-series, 5 episodes
2016	Line of Duty	Reynolds	Episodes: "Monsters", "The Process" & "Snake Pit"
2016	Hooten & the Lady	Clive Stephenson	Sky 1 Series
2018–2019	Lost in Space	Captain Radic	Netflix Series
2019	The Accident	Martin Harris	Mini-series, all 4 episodes
2020	Small Axe	Frank Crichlow	Episode: "Mangrove"
2022	The Suspect	DI Ruiz	Mini-series, 5 episodes
2025	Death by Lightning	Dr. Charles Burleigh Purvis	Mini-series, 1 episode
TBA	Saviour	Detective Inspector Jon Creasy	Main cast

== Theatre appearances ==
Year	Title	Role	Notes
2001	Blue Orange	Christopher	Duchess Theatre, London
2005	Elmina's Kitchen	Digger, the Yardie	
2006	Titus Andronicus	Aaron, the Moor	The Globe performance of Shakespeare's classic
2014	Tiger Country		Nina Raine’s play at Hampstead theatre
