= Between C & D =

Former magazine

Between C & D (1983–1990) was a Lower East Side quarterly literary magazine, edited by Joel Rose and Catherine Texier. The name of the magazine references the apartment where Rose and Texier lived and produced the magazine, which was located between Avenue C and Avenue D in the East Village. However, it has also been suggested that the title is short for "between coke and dope," giving an indication of the transgressive content and ethos. The tagline of the magazine was "Sex. Drugs. Danger. Violence. Computers."

The magazine was printed on fanfold computer paper, sold in a plastic bag and featured original artwork on each binding. The founders originally intended to print a maximum of 75 copies per issue. However, the rising popularity of the magazine led them to print 600 copies per issue, with each issue being sold out. These limited run editions were collected by New York galleries and libraries, including the Whitney Museum, Museum of Modern Art, and New Museum. As has been erroneously reported, back issues were never sold on computer disk.

== Contributors ==
The majority of the writers lived in urban environments, including the Lower East Side neighborhood of New York and Los Angeles. It was emphasized that "this is not writing-school writing" by the founders, although some of the contributors had attended MFA writing programs. Contributors included Kathy Acker, Roberta Allen, Bruce Benderson, Lisa Blaushild, Emily Carter, Peter Cherches, Dennis Cooper, Susan Daitch, Lee Eiferman, John Farris, Craig Gholson, Joan Harvey, Rick Henry, Gary Indiana, Darius James, Tama Janowitz, Ron Kolm, Patrick McGrath, Reinaldo Povod, Joel Rose, Don Skiles, Catherine Texier, Lynne Tillman, David Wojnarowicz, and Barry Yourgrau. The founders described the general style of the magazine writers as, "gritty, urban, sometimes ironic, sometimes gutsy, erotic, violent, or deadpan, unsentimental rather than 'sensitive' or 'psychological,' playing with form but clearly narrative by intention." American Book Review wrote: "If there's a cutting edge in American fiction . . . Between C & D is on it."

In 1984, Anthony Bourdain visited the apartment of the magazine, uninvited, "...dressed in chef’s whites and clearly high on heroin." During that visit, he submitted his writing and drawings for publication. While Rose did not like the drawings, he did like the writing. The magazine eventually published a story written by Bourdain, which was about a chef scoring heroin on the Lower East Side. Over the years, Rose helped nurture the talent of Bourdain, and they eventually published a number of books together, including Typhoid Mary, and the graphic novels, Get Jiro!, Get Jiro: Blood and Sushi, and Anthony Bourdain's Hungry Ghosts, in 2018.

== Books & Anthologies ==
In 1988, Penguin published the anthology Between C & D: New Writing from the Lower East Side Fiction Magazine for its Contemporary American Fiction series that included twenty-five writers chosen by Rose and Texier. As written in the book's introduction, "If you were living in Manhattan in the early eighties and didn't feel any affinity for the school of 'dirty realism' or weren't writing 'sensitive' narration teeming with believable characters a reader could care for throughout the lens of a novel, you were left high and dry on the Downtown shore. Between C&D offered an exclusive forum for these writers, both established and emerging, whose voice were not being heard in the usual gamut of conventional literary magazines."

The Ottawa Citizen said of the anthology: "An acerbic, urban edge mixes with commendable stylistic diversity from David Wojnarowicz, Dennis Cooper, Kathy Acker, Rick Henry and Darius James."

The magazine was discussed in the book Up Is Up, But So Is Down: New York's Downtown Literary Scene, 1974-1992 (NYU Press, 2006), written by Brandon Stosuy.
