= Jakten på Billie Jo =

Swedish reality television series

Jakten på Billie Jo ("The Hunt for Billie Jo") was a Swedish reality show first broadcast on August 4, 2000 on TV4. The show followed three American actresses who auditioned for the role as "Billie Jo" in the Swedish soap opera Nya tider. The winner was Alexandra Sapot who came to play the villain "Billie Jo". The winner was decided by partly Swedish viewers televotes and the production company Jarowskij.

== Contestants ==
- Tanya Gingerich
- Melissa Hanson
- Hope Harris
- Alexandra Sapot

== Sources ==
- Jakten på Billie Jo
- Alex Sapot won the role as Billie Jo
