= I Can't Think Straight =

2008 film by Shamim Sarif

- Theatrical release poster
- Directed by: Shamim Sarif
- Screenplay by: Shamim Sarif; Kelly Moss
- Based on: I Can't Think Straight by Shamim Sarif
- Produced by: Hanan Kattan
- Starring: Lisa Ray; Sheetal Sheth
- Cinematography: Aseem Bajaj
- Edited by: David Martin
- Music by: Raiomond Mirza
- Production company: Enlightenment Productions
- Distributed by: Enlightenment Films
- Release dates: 26 October 2008 (Hamburg International Lesbian and Gay Film Festival); 3 April 2009 (United Kingdom)
- Running time: 80 minutes
- Country: United Kingdom
- Language: English

I Can't Think Straight is a 2008 British romantic drama film directed by Shamim Sarif. Based on Sarif's 2008 novel of the same name, the film tells the story of a London-based Jordanian of Palestinian descent, Tala, who is preparing for an elaborate wedding when a turn of events causes her to have an affair, and subsequently fall in love, with another woman, Leyla, a British Indian. The film stars Lisa Ray and Sheetal Sheth.

I Can't Think Straight was produced by Enlightenment Productions and distributed in the United States by Regent Releasing and Here! Films. It was released in different regions between 2008 and 2009. The DVD was released on 4 May 2009.

The lead actresses, Ray and Sheth, also starred in Sarif's 2007 lesbian-themed historical drama film The World Unseen.

== Plot ==
In the upper echelons of traditional Middle Eastern society, wealthy Christian Palestinians Reema and Omar prepare for the marriage of their visiting daughter Tala to Hani in Jordan. But back at work in London, Tala encounters Leyla, a young British Indian Muslim woman who is dating Tala's best friend Ali. Tala sees something unique in the artless, clumsy, sensitive Leyla who secretly works to become a writer. And Tala's forthright challenges to Leyla's beliefs begins a journey of self-awareness for Leyla. After a weekend getaway into the countryside, Tala and Leyla sleep together and the two women begin to fall in love. However, Tala's own sense of duty and cultural restraint cause her to pull away from Leyla and fly back to Jordan where the preparations for an ostentatious wedding are well under way.

As family members descend and the wedding day approaches, the pressure mounts until Tala finally cracks and extricates herself. Back in London, Leyla is heartbroken but learns to break free of her own self-doubt and her mother's expectations, ditching Ali and being honest with her parents about her sexuality. When Ali and Leyla's feisty sister, Yasmin, help try to get Tala and Leyla together again, Tala finds that her own preconceptions of what love can be is the final hurdle she must jump to win Leyla back.

== Cast ==
- Lisa Ray as Tala
- Sheetal Sheth as Leyla
- Antonia Frering as Reema - Tala's mother
- Dalip Tahil as Omar - Tala's father
- Ernest Ignatius as Sam - Leyla's father
- Siddiqua Akhtar as Maya - Leyla's mother
- Amber Rose Revah as Yasmin - Leyla's sister
- Anya Lahiri as Lamia - Tala's middle sister
- Kimberly Jaraj as Zina - Tala's younger sister
- Rez Kempton as Ali - Tala's best friend, Leyla's boyfriend
- Daud Shah as Hani - Tala's fiancé
- Sam Vincenti as Kareem - Lamia's husband
- Ishwar Maharaj as Sami - Kareem's younger brother
- George Tardios as Uncle Ramzi
- Nina Wadia as Rani the Housekeeper

== Critical reception ==
The New York Times called the film "another weightless confection from the writer and director Shamim Sarif."

Autostraddle said that it "stands out for its cultural specificity, truly stunning leads, and endless charm."

AfterEllen's review notes, "While the film has a lot going for it, the script is surprisingly paint-by-the-numbers. Viewers familiar with lesbian films will be able to call the ending (and all major points of conflict) long before the credits roll. Also surprising is the number of cringe-worthy lines Ray and Sheth utter."

== Awards ==
- Best Feature, Audience Award - Miami Gay & Lesbian Film Festival 2009
- Best Feature - International Gay and Lesbian Film Festival Of Canary Islands, 2009
- Best Feature - Afterellen Visibility Awards
- Best Feature, Audience Award - Melbourne Queer Film Festival 2009
- Best Feature, Audience Award - Pink Apple 2009
- Audience Award Best Feature Film - Fairy Tales International Queer Diversity Film Festival (Calgary) 2009
- Jury Winner Best Feature Film - Festival Del Mar, Majorca 2009
- Audience Award, Best Feature - Vancouver Queer Film Festival 2009
- Best lesbian movie - The Holebifilmfestival Vlaams-Brabant 2009, Belgium
- Jury award for Best Women's Feature - Tampa International Gay & Lesbian Film Festival 2009
- Best Feature Film - Gay Film Nights International Film Festival 2009

== See also ==
- List of LGBT-related films directed by women
