= Pia Johansson =

Swedish actress (born 1960)

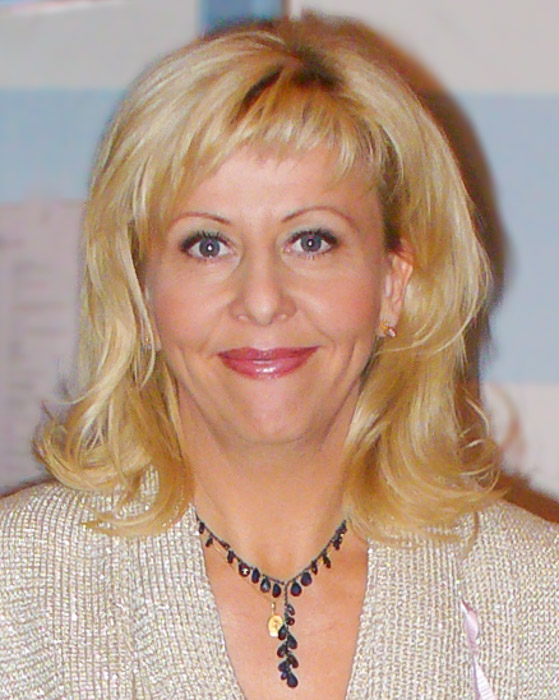
- Born: Pia Ann-Kristin Johansson; 16 November 1960 (age 65); Umeå, Sweden
- Occupations: actor, comedian, radio and TV personality, lecturer, moderator
- Years active: 1987–

Pia Ann-Kristin Johansson (born 16 November 1960 in Umeå) is a Swedish actor, comedian and lecturer.

Johansson studied at the Skara scene school, which was followed by a degree from Swedish National Academy of Mime and Acting in 1989. After studying she was employed at Stockholm City Theatre's permanent ensemble. She has been a guest on a number of productions, such as På minuten, Så ska det låta and the radio show Sommar. She has also taken part in the TV program Parlamentet. Johansson participated in Let's Dance 2016 which was broadcast on TV4.

Since adulthood, Johansson has been a practicing Catholic. She elaborated, "I have always felt that everything is animated. I kept a lot to myself, I didn't want my faith to be tarnished. But as an adult, I wanted to take all that seriously, so I sought out a Catholic priest and wanted to convert. It felt like Catholicism was more hardcore than the Church of Sweden. The sacraments, the confession, they felt right to me."
