= Ulf Larsson =

Swedish actor, comedian, writer and director

- Born: Ulf Sigfrid Larsson; 1 July 1956; Stockholm, Sweden
- Died: 28 September 2009 (aged 53); Solna, Sweden
- Occupations: Actor, comedian, writer, director
- Spouse: Lillemor Torsslow

Ulf Sigfrid "Uffe" Larsson (1 July 1956 – 28 September 2009) was a Swedish actor, revue artist, comedian and stage director.

Ulf Larsson was born in Bromma, Stockholm, in 1956. In the early 1980s, he appeared in numerous television shows and stage productions. In the 1980s he also became well known by children in the Bröderna Olsson ("Olsson brothers"), and in Kusiner i kubik ("cousins cubed"), and told stories in Pratmakarna ("the talkers"). His real breakthrough, however, came as he hosted the popular entertainment-show Söndagsöppet ("open on Sunday").

Ulf Larsson also participated in stage productions such as Charley's Aunt at the Intiman Theatre in Stockholm. He produced most of his own material and also wrote a novel, Kvartingen som sprängdes, where he describes his personal abuse of alcohol. Larsson died from an aortic aneurysm in his residence in Solna in 2009.
