= Lisa Ray =

Canadian actress (born 1972)

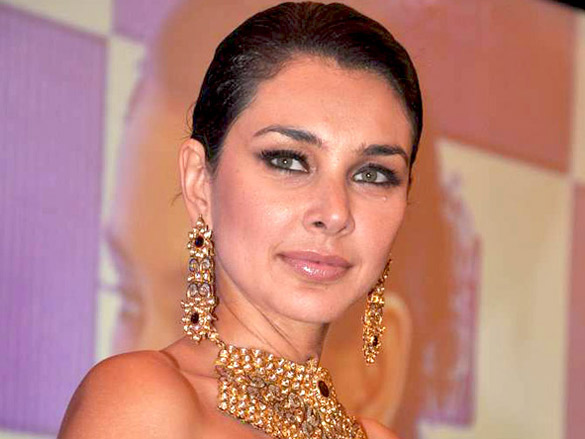
- Ray in 2012
- Born: 4 April 1972 (age 54); Toronto, Ontario, Canada
- Occupations: Actress; model
- Years active: 1991–present
- Spouse: Jason Dehni (m. 2012)
- Children: 2
- Website: lisaraywrites.com

Lisa Rani Ray (Bengali pronunciation: [lisa rae̯]; born 4 April 1972) is an Indo-Canadian actor, model, entrepreneur, writer, and public speaker. She began her modelling career in India in the early 1990s, appearing for leading Indian brands including like Bombay Dyeing and Lakmé. Through her acting career, Ray has demonstrated a penchant for issue-oriented portrayals, most notably in the 2005 Academy Award–nominated Canadian film Water, and the award-winning South African feature The World Unseen described by a reviewer as "one of the best-conceived queer films of the past year."

In 2009, Ray was diagnosed with multiple myeloma, an incurable form of blood cancer. She began writing The Yellow Diaries, a blog about her experiences of having cancer. Her writing and columns have since regularly appeared in multiple major publications. Ray remains an active advocate of stem-cell therapy and has participated in several successful fundraisers and cancer awareness campaigns.

In 2011, Ray began hosting a popular travel show on Discovery Channel India alongside appearing as host and judge in Food Network's highest rated show, Top Chef Canada.

In 2019, HarperCollins India published her debut memoir Close to the Bone, which won the Laadli Media and Advertising Award for Gender Sensitivity in 2020. The book was released in North America by Doubleday Canada (a Penguin Random House imprint) on 3 November 2020. HarperCollins India has since acquired the next three works of Lisa Ray in an exclusive world-rights deal.

In 2026, Ray co-founded NuHer, a science-backed women's midlife and menopause clinic based in Mumbai, alongside Binoy Khimji, Zaheer Khan, and Vikas Shah. She continues to act, most recently in Amazon Prime Video's Four More Shots Please! (2019–2025) and A.R. Rahman's 99 Songs (2021).^{[67][68]}

In 2016, Ray opened an Instagram account dedicated to poetry.

== Early life ==
Ray was born in Toronto to an Indian Bengali Hindu father and a Polish Catholic mother and grew up in the suburb of Etobicoke. She spoke Polish with her maternal grandmother and watched movies of Federico Fellini and Satyajit Ray with her cinephile dad. During her childhood she spent some time in Calcutta.

She excelled academically, doing five years of high school in four, while attending three different high schools: Etobicoke Collegiate Institute, Richview Collegiate Institute and Silverthorn Collegiate Institute.

== Modelling, film and television career ==
=== 1991–2000 ===
Ray's modelling career began when she was "discovered" during a family vacation in India while still in her teens. An advertisement for Bombay Dyeing where she appeared in a black swimsuit opposite Karan Kapoor earned Ray her first taste of public attention. A subsequent meeting with Maureen Wadia, editor of Indian fashion magazine Gladrags, resulted in an iconic swimsuit cover that catapulted Ray to nationwide fame in India. "Most of my most fulfilling professional moments came to me via serendipity", Ray later wrote.

By the time the Gladrags cover broke, Ray was back in Toronto ready to begin university. Her plans were thwarted after a tragic auto accident that would consign her mother to a wheelchair for the rest of her life. Ray returned to India and went on to become one of the country's first supermodels, and the face of Lakmé and Bombay Dyeing. Ray would later acknowledge this coinciding of professional triumph and personal tragedy as a recurring theme in her life. "I have come to recognise that every major turning point in my life is preceded by pain", she wrote in Femina in 2016.

As one of India's most successful cover models, Ray would subsequently lend her face to iconic global brands such as L’Oréal, MasterCard, De Beers and Rado. ^{]} Her ambassadorship with the Swiss watchmaker Rado, beginning in 2000, has spanned over a decade and stands as one of the longest celebrity brand endorsements in India. A Times of India poll named her the "ninth most beautiful woman of the millennium," the only model in the top ten. She co-anchored the TV show Star Biz on Star Movies and appeared in a music video for Afreen Afreen, a ghazal written by Javed Akhtar, and composed and performed by Nusrat Fateh Ali Khan.

=== 2001–2009 ===
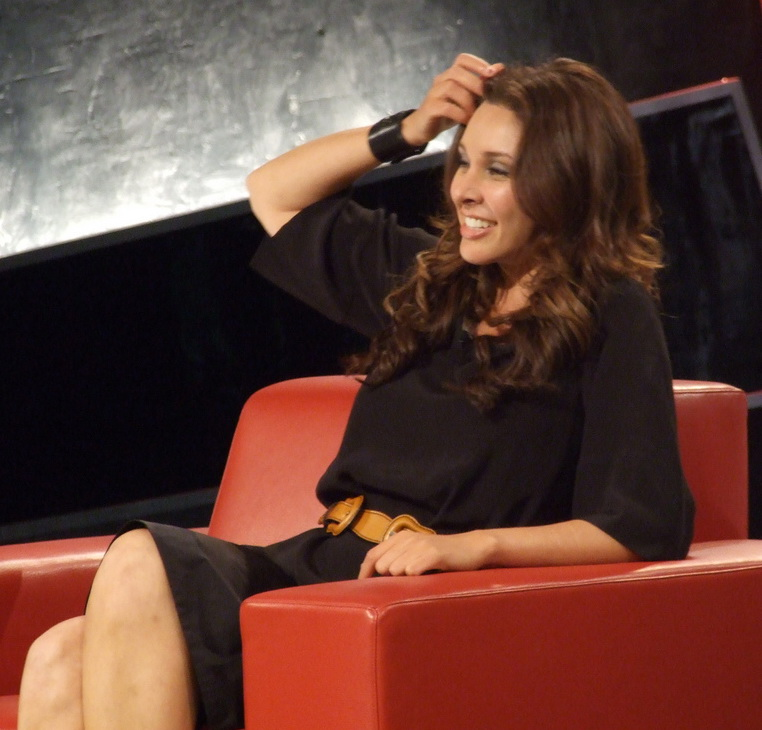
Lisa Ray being interviewed on The Hour

After turning down a number of roles, Ray made her Indian Film Industry debut in 2001 with the Hindi film Kasoor, opposite Aftab Shivdasani, in which her voice was dubbed by Divya Dutta, because she could not speak Hindi. In spite of that, her performance received positive reviews. Her work in the film also caught the eye of Deepa Mehta, who cast her in the romantic Indian-Canadian romp Bollywood/Hollywood in 2002.

Realizing that acting was something that she wanted to pursue more seriously, Ray moved to London to concentrate on a career in the performing arts. While there, Ray studied at the Central School of Speech and Drama, the London Centre for Theatre Studies, the Desmond Jones school of Physical Theatre, and BADA. She graduated from the Academy of Live and Recorded Arts (ALRA), in 2004, with a post-graduate degree in acting. While studying, Ray made a conscious effort to not accept any film offers until she had graduated. However, while still at ALRA, she received another call from Deepa Mehta, who made her an offer she simply could not refuse—the lead role of Kalyani in Mehta's much-anticipated, and eventually highly controversial, feature, Water. In the film, Lisa spoke her lines in Hindi, although her voice was dubbed in the final cut. Water released in 2005 to both national and global critical acclaim, with the venerable Roger Ebert describing it as "lovely in the way Satyajit Ray's films are lovely",

Ray has since worked in productions from Canada, Europe, and the United States. Past roles include a farm girl in All Hat, a school teacher in A Stone's Throw, and a housewife in 1950s-apartheid South Africa in The World Unseen. In 2008 Ray starred, alongside Sheetal Sheth and Amber Rose Revah, in the Shamim Sarif directed British romantic comedy I Can't Think Straight that went on to win awards in queer film festivals worldwide, including Dallas OUT TAKES, Miami Gay and Lesbian Film Festival, and Tampa International Gay and Lesbian Film festival.

After graduation, Ray based herself out of Milan, Paris, and New York from 2004 to 2008, returning to Toronto upon her mother's death in late 2008. In 2007, Ray completed filming for Kill Kill Faster Faster, which is a contemporary film noir inspired by the critically acclaimed novel of the same name, by Joel Rose. She guest-starred in a 2009 episode of the USA Network series Psych, and appeared in Woody Harrelson starrer Canadian-American superhero film Defendor. Also in 2009, she starred in the Deepa and Dilip Mehta comedy Cooking with Stella.

Appearing at the 2009 Toronto International Film Festival in support of the film, Ray revealed that she had been diagnosed with multiple myeloma.

=== 2010s ===
On Christmas in 2009, Ray received a stem cell transplant to treat her rare cancer. In April 2010, she announced she was cancer-free due to the transplant. She gave a candid interview on her personal cancer trauma and surviving it, appearing on the cover of the 2010 anniversary issue of the Indian men's luxury magazine The Man.

2010 saw Ray in UniGlobe Entertainment's cancer docu-drama titled 1 a Minute. The documentary was made by Namrata Singh Gujral and featured cancer survivors Olivia Newton-John, Diahann Carroll, Melissa Etheridge, Mumtaz, Bárbara Mori and Jaclyn Smith, as well as William Baldwin, Daniel Baldwin, and Priya Dutt, whose lives have been touched by cancer. The feature was narrated by Kelly McGillis.

On 5 July 2010, Ray hosted an informal lunch for Queen Elizabeth II and Prince Philip during their visit to Toronto.

In 2011, Ray acted in the stage play Taj, opposite Kabir Bedi at Luminato Festival, Toronto's International Festival of Arts and Ideas. Written by Canadian playwright John Murrell, Taj combined poetry, music, theatre, and the Indian classical dance form kathak. The production was described by The Globe and Mail critic Deirdre Kelly "as luminous and poignant as the building that inspired it".

In the same year, Ray appeared in Craig Goodwill's award-winning fantasy drama film Patch Town, and a season 4 episode of Canadian Television period crime drama series Murdoch Mysteries, titled "The Black Hand".

She presented the 2011 IIFA Awards in Toronto, and was a co-presenter the 2011 Giller Prize along with singer-songwriter Nelly Furtado and roots rock guitarist Robbie Robertson.

Also in 2011, Ray appeared as host and travel guide on Oh My Gold, a five part series on Discovery Travel & Living, now TLC India.

In 2012, Ray began hosting season two of Top Chef Canada, Food Network Canada's highest rated series. The season premiered in March 2012.

Speaking to The Telegraph in 2012, Ray remarked, "I think every film that I’ve done so far has been a turning point because I experimented with each one and grew professionally. The movies I chose, dealt with a lot of thought-provoking subjects.

In 2016, Ray starred in Ram Gopal Varma's Veerappan. She also played a crucial supporting role in 2017’s Dobaara, the official Bollywood adaptation of supernatural horror film Oculus.

In 2019, Ray was a celebrity panellist on CBC Radio's book-debate series Canada Reads, championing David Chariandy's novel Brother.

Since 2019, Ray has appeared as part of an ensemble cast in the Amazon Prime Video web series Four More Shots Please!. After a successful first season aired in over 200 countries and regions, the series returned for a second season in 2020 and a third season in 2022. and a fourth and final season in 2025.

In 2021, Ray appeared in 99 Songs, an Indian Hindi-language musical romance film co-written and produced by A. R. Rahman.^{[68]}

== Writing ==
=== Close to the Bone ===
Close to the Bone, Ray's debut memoir, was published by HarperCollins India in May 2019. The book chronicles her entry into the Indian entertainment industry at sixteen, her relationship with her Bengali father and Polish mother, life on movie sets, her battle with eating disorders, her diagnosis with multiple myeloma at thirty-seven, and her spiritual journey.

The North American edition was published by Doubleday Canada, a Penguin Random House imprint, on 3 November 2020.

The book received strong critical reception and won the Laadli Media and Advertising Award for Gender Sensitivity at the 10th edition of the awards in 2020. Following the memoir's success, HarperCollins India acquired the next three works of Lisa Ray in an exclusive world-rights deal.

=== Poetry ===
Ray is a published poet whose work explores themes of identity and what she has described as "a life of no fixed address." Her poems have appeared in literary publications including The Punch Magazine.

== Entrepreneurship ==
=== NuHer (2026–present) ===
In 2026, Ray co-founded NuHer, a science-backed women's midlife and menopause clinic based in Mumbai, with co-founders Binoy Khimji, Zaheer Khan, and Vikas Shah — the team behind the wellness initiative NuHealth. NuHer provides integrated care for women navigating perimenopause and menopause, with a medical panel including Dr Reina Punj, Dr Kajal Parikh, Dr Priyanka Mehta, Dr Anuya Manerkar, Priyanka Kapoor, and Parinaz Agha.

Ray has cited her own experience of chemotherapy-induced menopause at age 37 — a consequence of her multiple myeloma treatment — as a founding motivation for the clinic.

NuHer's associated podcast, Is It Hot In Here?, hosted by Ray, launched in 2026 and features conversations with public figures, medical experts, and community voices around perimenopause, menopause, and midlife women's health.

== Public speaking ==
Ray has more than fifteen years of experience as a public and motivational speaker across international platforms. She is represented globally by the London Speaker Bureau and in India by Exceed Entertainment. Her speaking engagements span keynote addresses and corporate wellness engagements for organisations including Goldman Sachs, EY, YPO (Young Presidents' Organization) and EO (Entrepreneurs' Organization), as well as philanthropic engagements for hospitals and cancer-care institutions.

== Advocacy ==
=== Cancer advocacy ===
Ray has been an active fundraiser and public advocate for stem-cell therapy and research, including work on behalf of the McEwen Centre for Regenerative Medicine at Toronto's University Health Network, and fundraising toward the establishment of the first research chair for multiple myeloma at Princess Margaret Hospital in Toronto.

In 2013, Ray designed a capsule saree collection with the Indian label Satya Paul, titled Ray of Hope, with proceeds directed to cancer charities including multiple myeloma research at Princess Margaret Cancer Centre. She has served as honorary co-chair for Blood Services Canada, and has been the face of the HDFC Cancer Care Campaign in India. She also launched a limited-edition fragrance, Jasmine of India, with the Canadian social enterprise The 7 Virtues. Ray was also the face of a widely-covered style campaign photographed by musician-photographer Bryan Adams.

=== Women's wellness advocacy ===
Ray has been a leading Indian voice on midlife women's health, particularly perimenopause and menopause awareness. Through NuHer and its associated podcast *Is It Hot In Here?*, she has advocated for expanded medical training on menopause in India, greater public conversation around midlife women's health, and access to hormone therapy and holistic care.

== Honours and recognition ==
- Ninth Most Beautiful Woman of the Millennium — Times of India poll (only model in the top ten)
- Voice Achievers Award (2009) — for cancer advocacy
- Hope Award (2010) — for cancer advocacy
- Queen Elizabeth II Diamond Jubilee Medal (2012–13) — for contributions to Canadian society
- HELLO! Canada 50 Most Beautiful Canadians (2013)
- Laadli Media and Advertising Award for Gender Sensitivity (2020) — for Close to the Bone

== Personal life ==
On 23 June 2009, Ray was diagnosed with multiple myeloma, a cancer of the white blood cells known as plasma cells, which produce antibodies. It is a rare disease. In April 2010, she announced that she was cancer-free, after an autologous stem cell transplant using her own stem cells. As multiple myeloma is an incurable disease, Ray is not completely cured of the disease.

In February 2012, Ray announced her engagement to Lebanese fintech founder Jason Dehni. On 20 October 2012, Ray and Dehni were married in California's Napa Valley.

In September 2018, Ray announced that she and her husband became parents to twin daughters via surrogacy, in June 2018.

== Filmography ==
=== Film ===
Year	Title	Role	Notes
1994	Hanste Khelte	Rekha	Special appearance
1996	Nethaji	Priya	Tamil film
2001	Yuvaraja	Lovely	Kannada film
2001	Kasoor	Simran Bhargav	
2002	Choron Ka Chor		
2002	Takkari Donga	Bhuvana	Telugu film
2002	Bollywood/Hollywood	Sunita "Sue" Singh	
2004	Ball & Chain	Saima	
2005	Water	Kalyani	
2005	Seeking Fear	Nina Atwal	
2006	The Flowerman	Louise	Short film
2006	Quarter Life Crisis	Angel Matthews	
2006	A Stone's Throw	Lia	
2007	All Hat	Etta Parr	
2007	I Can't Think Straight	Tala	
2007	The World Unseen	Miriam	
2008	Kill Kill Faster Faster	Fleur	
2008	Toronto Stories	Beth	
2009	Defendor	Dominique Ball	
2009	Cooking with Stella	Maya Chopra	
2009	Somnolence		
2010	Let the Game Begin	Eva Stout	
2010	Trader Games	Sarah	
2011	Patch Town	Bethany Franks	Short film
2016	Ishq Forever	Naina	
2016	Veerappan	Shreya	
2017	Dobaara: See Your Evil	Liza Merchant	
2019	99 Songs	Sheila	Written and produced by A. R. Rahman

=== Television ===
Year	Title	Role	Notes
2007	Blood Ties	Elena	Stone Cold
2008	The Summit	Rebecca Downy	
2009	Psych	Sita	Bollywood Homicide S04E06
2011	Murdoch Mysteries	Mirela	The Black Hand
2011	Endgame	Rosemary Venturi	Regular role
2012–2014	Top Chef Canada	Host	Seasons 2–4
2019	Canada Reads	Panelists	CBC Radio — defended *Brother* by David Chariandy
2019–2025	Four More Shots Please!	Samara Kapoor	All four seasons — final season 2025

== Philanthropy ==
- 2009: 5K Your Way Walk/Run, MMWalk for the Cure
- 2009: Plan Canada's 'Because I Am A Girl' campaign
- 2010: Plan Canada's 'Because I Am A Girl' campaign
- 2010: "1 a Minute", to inspire women and give them hope
- 2010: Estee Lauder Breast Cancer Awareness
- 2011: 'Make Myeloma Matter' media campaign
- 2011: Artbound, in support of Free The Children
- 2011: GIRL 20 SUMMIT
- 2012: BE FAIR 2 RARE
- 2012: Wellspring Cancer 'Graduate' Fashion show
- 2012: "Rhythm and Soul"-THE SPARK GALA 2012, to Ignite A Child's Potential
- 2012: Run or Walk, MM5K
- 2012: Plan Canada's 'Because I Am A Girl' campaign
- 2012: Ambassador for Pantene Beautiful Lengths campaign in Canada

== See also ==
- List of Canadian actors
- List of Indian film actresses
