= Lennart Swahn =

Swedish television presenter (1927–2008)

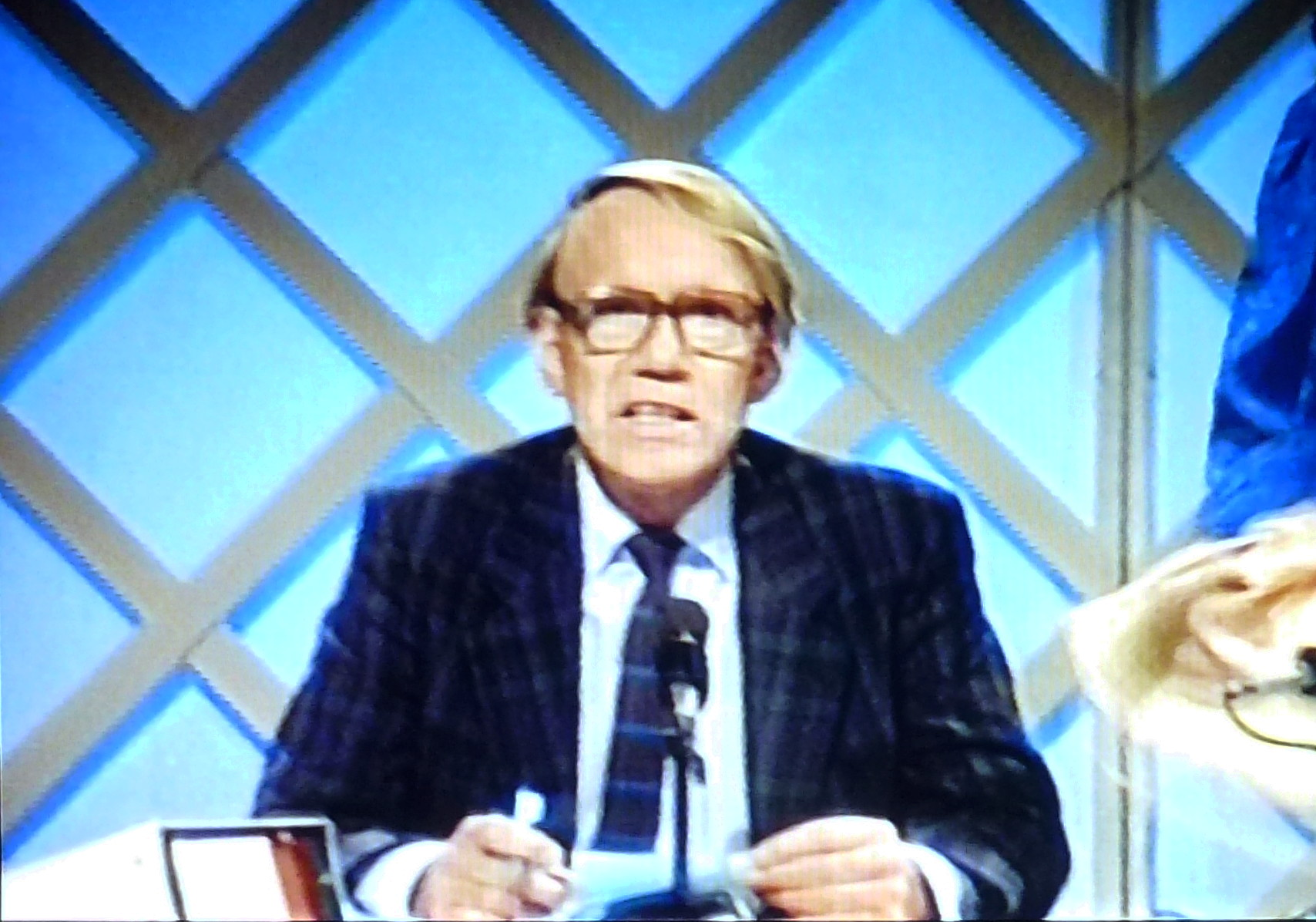
- Swahn as host of Babbel (1986).
- Born: Olof Algot Lennart Svahn; 8 April 1927; Stockholm, Sweden
- Died: 27 August 2008 (aged 81); Tyresö, Sweden
- Occupations: Journalist, TV host
- Partner: David Bonnier

Olof Algot Lennart Svahn, later Olof Lennart Swahn (8 April 1927 – 27 August 2008) was a Swedish journalist and radio and television personality.

== Early life ==
Swahn was born on 8 April 1927 in Stockholm, Sweden, the son of Karl Algot Swahn (1900–1976), a salesman, and his wife Ellen Fryklund (1904–1999). He had a 15-year younger brother, Eigil Svahn. He graduated from Stockholms stads handelsgymnasium in 1947

== Career ==
Swahn was a reporter for the Associated Press from 1948 to 1950 as well as for the newspaper Arbetaren and Sveriges Radio from 1950 to 1953. Swahn worked as a music critic for the newspaper Stockholms-Tidningen from 1953 to 1957 and studied at the University of Minnesota in the United States in 1955. He was a PR man for Svensk Filmindustri in 1957 and opera and ballet critic for the journal Scen och Salong from 1957 and culture reporter for Sveriges Radio from 1960.

Swahn was producer for Riksronden and På minuten and music and entertainment programs on radio and television. When he in the early 1970s came to television and became the host of the cafe program Halvsju he became nationally famous. He was TV host for Riksronden, På minuten, Babbel, Halvsju, Gäster med gester (Give Us a Clue), Razzel and Blåsningen. He also presented New Year's concerts and the Nobel Banquet as well as Melodifestivalen 1986 together with Tommy Engstrand.

Swahn was chairman of Stockholms sångarförbund from 1983.

== Personal life and death ==
Swahn was for many years living with David Bonnier (born 1933), the son of publisher Kaj Bonnier and Ulla (née Wetterlind). Swahn and Bonnier lived together in an apartment, each with a door and nameplate on Odengatan in Stockholm. Two weeks before his death Swahn changed his address to Bonnier's summer house in Tyresö, where he spent much of his final time. Swahn moved to Maria Regina Hospice in Nacka in March 2008 where he spent four months. In late July 2008, Swahn was admitted to Södersjukhuset in Stockholm. On 19 August 2008 he was transferred to the Handen Hospital where he died a week later. Swahn was buried at Tyresö Begravningsplats close to Tyresö Church.
