= Polarized (film) =

2023 British/Canadian drama film

- Directed by: Shamim Sarif
- Written by: Shamim Sarif
- Produced by: Juliette Hagopian; Hanan Kattan
- Starring: Holly Deveaux; Maxine Denis
- Cinematography: Greg Nicod
- Edited by: John Gurdebeke; Sarah Peddie
- Music by: Kevon Cronin
- Production companies: Blue Denim Films; Echo Lake Entertainment; Enlightenment Productions; Julijette
- Distributed by: Photon Films (Canada); ABC Theatrical Distribution (United Kingdom)
- Release date: March 18, 2023 (BFI Flare)
- Running time: 105 minutes
- Countries: Canada; United Kingdom
- Languages: English; Arabic

Polarized is a British-Canadian drama film, written and directed by Shamim Sarif and released in 2023. The film stars Holly Deveaux as Lisa, a young farm girl from rural Manitoba who is fired by manager Dalia (Maxine Denis) from her job after an angry, racially insensitive outburst, only for the two women to subsequently develop a romantic relationship which tests the divisions and cleavages in the community around race, religion and sexuality.

The cast also includes Hesham Hammoud, Abraham Asto, Tara Samuel, Elie Gemael, Sandrella Mohanna, Peter Bou-Ghannam, Baraka Rahmani, Paul Essiembre, Chris Sigurdson, Darren Martens, Adam Hurtig, Gabriel Daniels, John B. Lowe, Marina Stephenson Kerr, Sarah Constible, Robert Nahum, Hazel Venzon, Kamal Chioua, Colleen Furlan and Brooke Palsson.

== Production ==
The film was inspired in part by Sarif's own 27-year relationship with her partner Hanan Kattan, who was one of the film's producers. Kattan and the couple's children, Luca and Ethan Sarif-Kattan, all had small supporting appearances in the film.

It was shot in Manitoba in the late summer and fall of 2021.

== Distribution ==
The film had a screening for distributors at the European Film Market in February 2023, before having its public premiere on March 18 at BFI Flare.

It had its Canadian premiere at the 2023 Canadian Film Festival, where it was the winner of the audience-voted People's Pick award.

== Critical response ==
Anne T. Donahue of The Globe and Mail wrote that the film "raises important questions about the limitations of seeing love through a binary lens, while challenging viewers to accept that even the sleepiest, most innocent-seeming towns can brim with racism and intolerance. While more scenes between both leads would’ve added even more believability to their relationship, Polarized is a beautifully shot and powerfully acted film that serves as a testament to the freedom only authenticity can bring."
