= Joel Rose =

American novelist

Joel Rose is an American novelist.

== Career ==
His novels include The Blackest Bird (2007), Kill the Poor (1988), and Kill Kill Faster Faster (1988). He also authored the urban historical, New York Sawed in Half: An Urban Historical (2001), and was editor of a collection that included work by Anthony Bourdain, Mat Johnson, Franz Lidz, and Jerry Stahl, among others. Rose's 1980s short stories, which appeared in a number of magazines, were called "scintillating slices of life in Manhattan's notorious Alphabet City . . . in a strong, sure style that never strains" by LA Weekly.

His articles has appeared in magazines and newspapers including BlackBook, Bomb, Details, the Los Angeles Times, Marie Claire, New York, New York Newsday, The New York Times, and Paper. He also established and co-edited (with Catherine Texier) the Lower East Side quarterly literary magazine Between C & D (1983–1990), and has written for several television shows, including Kojak and Miami Vice.

Kill the Poor and Kill Kill Faster Faster were made into films in 2003 and 2008, respectively, and Rose participated in the screen adaptation of the latter. Kill Kill Faster Faster (2008) won Best International Feature at the 2008 London Independent Film Festival, won Best Editing in a HD Feature Film and second place in Best High-Definition Feature at the 2008 HDFest, and won Best Independent Feature Film at 2008 Charity Erotic Awards.

Rose has edited and co-authored graphic novels for DC Comics, including La Pacifica (Paradox Press), written with Amos Poe with art by Tayyar Ozkan, and Get Jiro! (Vertigo Comics), co-written alongside Anthony Bourdain and illustrated by Langdon Foss. Get Jiro! was a #1 New York Times Bestseller. A prequel to Get Jiro!, titled Get Jiro: Blood and Sushi, was published in October 2015. Blood and Sushi was also a New York Times Bestseller. The Get Jiro! graphic novels are set to receive an adult animated television series adaptation produced by Warner Bros. Animation and DC Studios, airing on Adult Swim in October 2026.

In 2018, Rose and Bourdain collaborated on the graphic novel Hungry Ghosts (Dark Horse Comics/Berger Books), based on the Edo period samurai game Hyakumonogatari Kaidankai (100 Candles) with cover art by Paul Pope and interior work featuring Vanesa Del Rey, Sebastian Cabrol, Francesco Francavilla, Irene Koh, Leonardo Manco, Alberto Ponticelli, and Mateus Santolouco.

Rose's novels have been translated into 12 languages.

== Personal life ==
Rose married Linda Rose-Winters (née Bowler) when they were both very young. He was married to his literary partner Catherine Texier, with whom he has two daughters. Texier documented the decline of their relationship in her memoir Breakup: The End of a Love Story (1998). Rose married editor/publisher Karen Rinaldi. They have one son and a trans femme daughter. The marriage ended in 2021.
