= Nya tider =

Swedish soap opera (1999-2006)

- Country of origin: Sweden
- Original language: Swedish

Original release
- Network: TV4
- Release: 30 August 1999 – 2 April 2006

Nya tider (lit. 'New Times') is a Swedish soap opera which was broadcast on TV4. It began after Skilda världar became a one-episode-a-week show. The show premiered in 1999 and received good ratings during the first season, but they soon dropped. The broadcast schedule was changed to one episode per week on Sundays, but this did not increase viewership; Nya tider never enjoyed the same viewership as Skilda världar. It was cancelled in 2006.

The show's cast included Rebecca Ferguson as Anna Gripenhielm (1999–2001).

In 2000 TV4 ran the reality show Jakten på Billie Jo to pick an actress to play the new villain, Billie Jo. American Alexandra Sapot won the role.
