= The World Unseen =

- Theatrical release poster
- Directed by: Shamim Sarif
- Screenplay by: Shamim Sarif
- Based on: The World Unseen by Shamim Sarif
- Produced by: Hanan Kattan
- Starring: Lisa Ray; Sheetal Sheth; Parvin Dabas
- Cinematography: Michael Downie
- Edited by: David Martin
- Music by: Richard Blackford
- Distributed by: Enlightenment Productions; Regent Releasing
- Release date: 9 September 2007 (Toronto International Film Festival)
- Running time: 94 minutes
- Countries: South Africa; United Kingdom
- Language: English

The World Unseen is a 2007 historical romantic drama film, written and directed by Shamim Sarif, adapted from her own novel. The film is set in 1950s Cape Town, South Africa during the expansion and codification of apartheid. The film stars Lisa Ray and Sheetal Sheth as two Indian South African women who fall in love in a racist, sexist and homophobic society.

Ray and Sheth also star together in another Shamim Sarif movie, I Can't Think Straight, released in November 2008.

The World Unseen was made with the assistance of the National Film and Video Foundation of South Africa, which took a minority equity stake in the film.

== Synopsis ==
In 1950s South Africa, a land torn apart by apartheid, Amina epitomizes individuality and freedom. She runs the Location Café, a haven of fun, food, and festivities open to all. Amina defines her own laws and lives on her own terms, undeterred by the reproving police and the disparaging Indian community.

Miriam demurely follows conventions and makes no demands on life. Her world is confined to being a doting mother to her three children and a subservient wife to her chauvinistic husband Omar.

Amina has a covert business partner, Jacob, who is barred from owning a business because the State considers him to be 'coloured'. He is attracted to Madeleine, a local white postmistress, but the indignities and injustices of the prevalent law thwart their desire to pursue a relationship.

Omar's sister Rehmat married a white man, against laws that forbid interracial marriages. When she needs protection from police, Amina shelters her, and her charm and strength of character captivate Miriam, who secretly rejoices when Amina accepts a farming job in her backyard. Amina notices Miriam's inherent kindness and silent dedication, and the mutual attraction between them grows. They bare their hearts to each other and their emotions get entangled. They contrive another reason to meet: driving lessons.

The inescapable social distance between them makes them question their feelings, but, in the midst of hatred and oppression, their only refuge is love.

Set in South Africa, The World Unseen follows Miriam's relationship with Amina and its influence on Miriam's personal decisions.

== Cast ==
- Lisa Ray as Miriam, a wife and mother who has recently immigrated to South Africa.
- Sheetal Sheth as Amina, a free-spirited café owner.
- Parvin Dabas as Omar, Miriam's chauvinistic and frustrated husband
- David Dennis as Jacob, Amina's business partner.
- Grethe Fox as Madeleine Smith, Jacob's White love interest who runs the local post office.
- Colin Moss as De Witt, a policeman and one of the film's primary antagonists.
- Nandana Sen as Rehmat
- Natalie Becker as Farah, Omar's lover
- Rajesh Gopie as Sadru
- Bernard White as Mr. Harjan
- Avantika Akerkar as Mrs. Harjan
- Amber Rose Revah as Begum
- Leonie Casanova as Doris, a waitress at Amina's café shop

== Reception ==
=== Critical response ===
On review aggregator Rotten Tomatoes, 30% of 27 reviews for the film are positive, with an average score of 4.5/10. The film was positively reviewed by the gay and lesbian media, with AfterEllen calling it "one of the best-conceived queer films of the past year – a sincere, beautifully realized vision of love and resistance in an intolerant world." However, many reviewers criticized the acting and directing of the film. Kirk Honeycutt of The Hollywood Reporter called the film "lifeless" and said that the "scenes are staged awkwardly and actors look generally uncomfortable."

=== Awards and honours ===
Awards
Award	Category	Name	Outcome
South African Film and Television Awards 2009	Best Director	Shamim Sarif	Won
South African Film and Television Awards 2009	Best Cinematographer	Mike Downie	Won
South African Film and Television Awards 2009	Best Supporting Actor	David Dennis	Won
South African Film and Television Awards 2009	Best Supporting Actress	Natalie Becker	Won
South African Film and Television Awards 2009	Best Ensemble Cast	The World Unseen	Won
South African Film and Television Awards 2009	Best Writing	Shamim Sarif	Won
South African Film and Television Awards 2009	Best Editor	Ronelle Loots, David Martin	Won
South African Film and Television Awards 2009	Best Production Designer	Tanya van Tonder	Won
South African Film and Television Awards 2009	Best Costume Designer	Danielle Knox	Won
South African Film and Television Awards 2009	Best Make Up/Hair Stylist	Caera O'Shaughneey	Won
South African Film and Television Awards 2009	Best Sound Designer	Barry Donnelly	Won
Phoenix International Film Festival	World Cinema Best Director	Shamim Sarif	Won
Clip Film Festival, USA	Best Director, Feature	Shamim Sarif	Won
Grand Canarias G&L International Film Festival	Best Actress	Sheetal Sheth	Won
Miami Gay & Lesbian Film Festival	Audience Award, Best Feature	The World Unseen	Won
Rehoboth Beach Independent Film Festival	Best Debut Feature	The World Unseen	Won
Paris Lesbian and Feminist Film Festival	Audience Award, Best Feature	The World Unseen	Won
Dallas Out Takes Film Festival	Best Actress	Sheetal Sheth	Won
Verzaubert - International Gay & Lesbian Film Festival	Silver Medal	The World Unseen	Won
Verzaubert - International Gay & Lesbian Film Festival	Best Picture	The World Unseen	Nominated
Tampa International Gay and Lesbian Film Festival	Audience Award for Best Film	The World Unseen	Won
Tampa International Gay and Lesbian Film Festival	Best Director	Shamim Sarif	Won

== See also ==
- List of LGBT-related films directed by women
