= Oliver Jackson-Cohen =

English actor (born 1986)

- Jackson-Cohen at 2022 Toronto International Film Festival
- Born: Oliver Mansour Jackson-Cohen; 24 October 1986 (age 40); London, England
- Education: Lee Strasberg Theatre and Film Institute
- Occupation: Actor
- Years active: 2002–present
- Mother: Betty Jackson

Oliver Mansour Jackson-Cohen (born 24 October 1986) is an English actor. He is known for his roles in the Netflix horror television series The Haunting of Hill House (2018) and The Haunting of Bly Manor (2020), as well as for his role as Adrian Griffin in the horror film The Invisible Man. He also had a recurring role in the television series Dracula (2013) and in the miniseries Wilderness (2023).

== Early life and education ==
Oliver Mansour Jackson-Cohen was born on 24 October 1986 in Westminster, London. His mother, Betty Jackson, is a fashion designer, and his father, David Cohen, was also his mother's business partner. His mother is English and from a Protestant background. His father was from an Orthodox Jewish family who moved to France in the 1950s; Jackson-Cohen has stated they were of Egyptian Jewish and Tunisian Jewish descent.

Jackson-Cohen attended a French-language school in London, the Lycée Français Charles de Gaulle, and says he has a slight French accent. He attended the Youngblood Theatre Company during weekends, then began washing vases for a florist as a job to support himself financially between auditions. He attended the Lee Strasberg Theatre and Film Institute in New York City due to not getting into drama school in London. His aim was to "do a foundational year and then reapply in London" but left after four months because he was offered a job.

== Career ==
Jackson-Cohen landed a small role in the television series Hollyoaks when he was 15, and he later appeared in the ITV series The Time of Your Life in 2007. In 2008, he played Phillip White in the BBC adaptation of Lark Rise to Candleford and in the first episode of Bonekickers. He also played Marcus in the short film The Rooftopsmiths by Len Rowles with Natasha Freeman as Imogen and Philip Marden as Joel. In 2010, he played Damon in the romantic comedy film Going the Distance starring Drew Barrymore and Justin Long. and a hitman in the action film Faster, opposite Dwayne Johnson. In 2011, he starred as Prince William, Duke of Cambridge in a series of Funny or Die videos with Allison Williams as newlywed Kate Middleton. Jackson-Cohen starred opposite Cynthia Nixon in the miniseries World Without End as Ralph. He appears in Mr Selfridge with Jeremy Piven where he plays the role of Roddy Temple.

In 2013, Jackson-Cohen was cast as journalist Jonathan Harker in the NBC series Dracula. In 2014, he was cast as Misha in the film adaptation of Shamim Sarif's 2004 novel Despite the Falling Snow. In March 2014, Jackson-Cohen was cast as James, Duke of York in ITV's four-part period drama miniseries The Great Fire.

It was announced in July 2014 that he would star opposite Sarah Snook in the 2015 ABC convict miniseries The Secret River, an adaptation of Kate Grenville's 2005 novel of the same name. In 2015, Jackson-Cohen also starred in The Healer as Alec Bailey. In the same year, Jackson-Cohen was cast as Lucas in Emerald City, a television series that re-imagined the novel The Wonderful Wizard of Oz by L. Frank Baum. The series premiered in 2017 and was cancelled after one season. He then appeared in both seasons of the anthology web television series The Haunting. Both seasons of the series, The Haunting of Hill House and The Haunting of Bly Manor, received strong critical praise.

Jackson-Cohen next starred opposite Elisabeth Moss in the science fiction horror film The Invisible Man, portraying the titular role; the film was released in 2020 to positive reviews. He later stated that the press tour for the film was difficult because it began just three days after his father had died. In 2021, he appeared in the drama film The Lost Daughter, directed by Maggie Gyllenhaal. In 2022, he co-starred in the romantic regency comedy Mr. Malcolm's List, a film adaptation of the novel of the same name. In June 2021 it was announced that he would star in the upcoming Apple TV+ series Surface playing the character of James Ellis. The series premiered on 29 July 2022 to mixed critical reviews, though Jackson-Cohen's performance generally received critical praise. On 2 December 2022, the show was renewed for a second season.

In June 2022, it was announced that Jackson-Cohen would star opposite Jenna Coleman in the upcoming Amazon Prime Video series Wilderness, a television adaptation of B.E. Jones's novel of the same name, which began filming summer 2022 in Canada, the UK and the US and wrapped in October 2022. In February 2023, Jackson-Cohen was announced as the lead in the upcoming feature film Jackdaw, written and directed by Jamie Childs. The film also stars his Wilderness costar Jenna Coleman, and was shot in December 2022 through January 2023 in various locations across England's Northeast coast. The film had its world premiere at Fantastic Fest on 22 September 2023.

== Personal life ==
Jackson-Cohen resides in London. In 2017, he stated in an Instagram post that he had been formally diagnosed with post-traumatic stress disorder stemming from child sexual abuse. His experiences informed his performance in The Haunting of Hill House: "I was diagnosed with PTSD a couple of years ago so all of that is in there with Luke - and it felt incredibly cathartic to be able to kind of put it all out there and be there."

He was in a relationship for several years with Jessica De Gouw, his Dracula co-star.

== Filmography ==
Key
†	Denotes works that have not yet been released

=== Film ===
Year	Title	Role	Notes	Ref.
2010	Going the Distance	Damon		
2010	Faster	Hitman		
2011	What's Your Number?	Eddie Vogel		
2012	The Raven	John Cantrell		
2016	Despite the Falling Snow	Misha		
2016	The Healer	Alec Bailey		
2020	The Invisible Man	Adrian Griffin		
2021	The Lost Daughter	Toni		
2022	Mr. Malcolm's List	Lord Cassidy		
2022	Emily	William Weightman		
2023	Jackdaw	Jack Dawson		
2025	The World Will Tremble	Solomon Wiener		

=== Television ===
Year	Title	Role	Notes	Ref.
2002	Hollyoaks	Jean-Pierre	Guest role	
2007	The Time of Your Life	Marcus	Episode #1.4	
2008	Lark Rise to Candleford	Phillip White	8 episodes	
2008	Bonekickers	Colm	Episode: "Army of God"	
2012	World Without End	Ralph Fitzgerald	8 episodes	
2013	Mr Selfridge	Roderick 'Roddy' Temple	6 episodes	
2013–2014	Dracula	Jonathan Harker	10 episodes	
2014	The Great Fire	James, Duke of York	4 episodes	
2015	The Secret River	William Thornhill	2 episodes Nominated – AACTA Award for Best Lead Actor in a Television Drama	
2017	Emerald City	Roan / Lucas	10 episodes	
2017	Man in an Orange Shirt	Michael Berryman	2 episodes	
2018	The Haunting of Hill House	Adult Luke Crain	10 episodes	
2020	The Haunting of Bly Manor	Peter Quint	9 episodes	
2022-2025	Surface	James Ellis	Main role	
2023	Wilderness	Will Taylor	Main role	
2025	Towards Zero	Neville Strange	Three-part miniseries, main role	

Web
Year	Title	Role	Notes	Ref.
2011	Will & Kate: Before Happily Ever After	Prince William	4 episodes	

== Awards and nominations ==
Association	Year	Category	Work	Result	Ref.
Australian Academy of Cinema and Television Arts Awards	2015	Best Lead Actor	The Secret River	Nominated	
Online Film & Television Association	2019	Best Ensemble in a Motion Picture or Limited Series	The Haunting of Hill House	Nominated	
Seattle Film Critics Society	2020	Best Villain	The Invisible Man	Won	
British Independent Film Awards	2022	Best Ensemble Performance	Emily	Nominated	
