= Antje Traue =

German actress (born 1981)

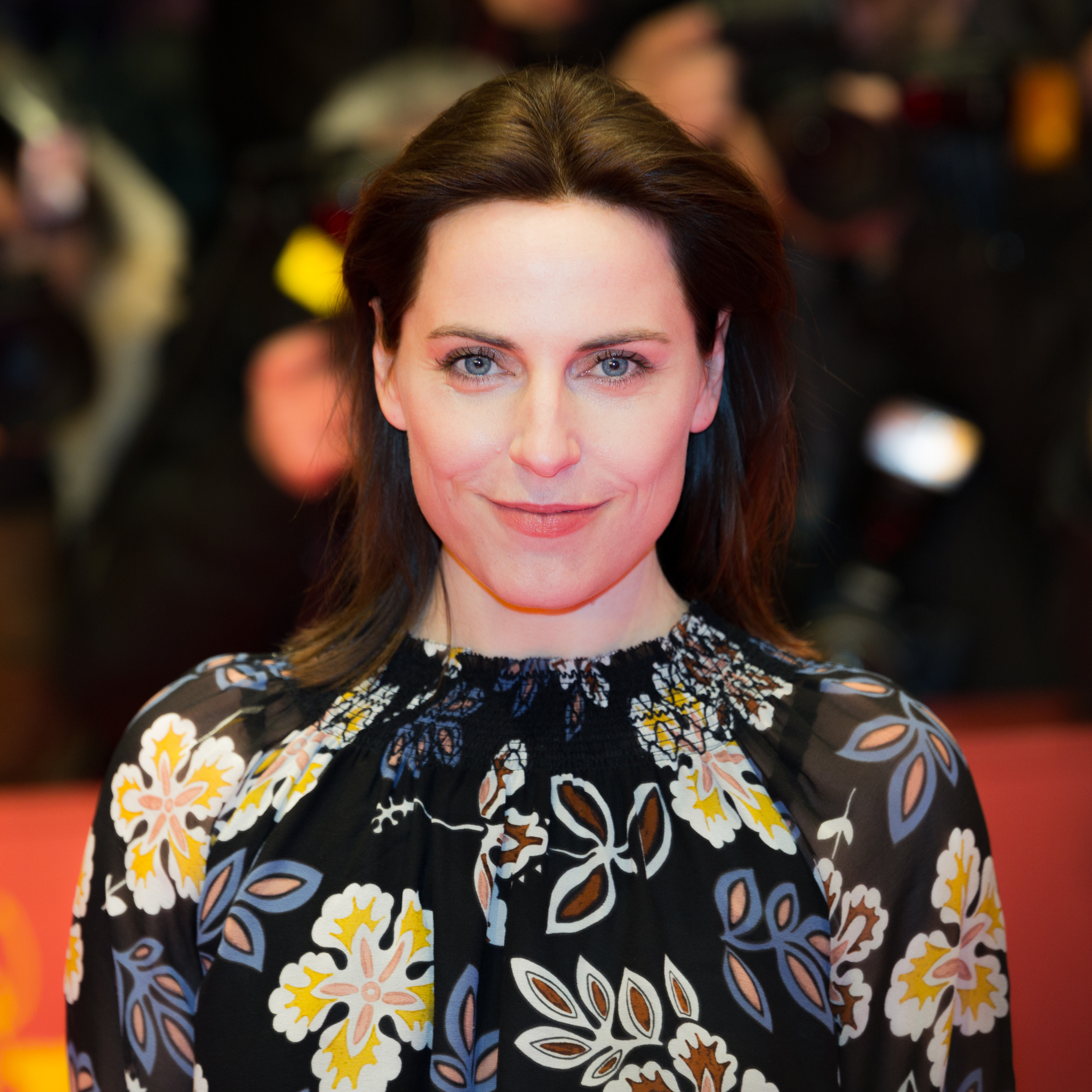
- Traue at the 67th Berlin International Film Festival (2017)
- Born: 18 January 1981 (age 45); Mittweida, East Germany
- Occupation: Actress
- Years active: 1997–present

Antje Traue (German: [ˈantjə ˈtʁaʊə]; born 18 January 1981) is a German actress. She started performing in plays as a sixteen-year-old in 1997, made her first screen appearance in the 2000 German film Verlorene Kinder, and appeared in her first English-language role for the 2009 film Pandorum. Internationally, she is known for her portrayal of the villain Faora-Ul in the DC Extended Universe films Man of Steel (2013) and The Flash (2023), as well as Agnes Nielsen in the German Netflix series Dark.

== Early life ==
Traue was born in Mittweida, Saxony, in the former German Democratic Republic (East Germany). Her mother was a dancer and musician. She speaks German and English fluently. She trained as an artistic gymnast from age six to her teens in an elite training-unit. Her stage-career began when she portrayed Jeanne d'Arc in a school-play. At sixteen, she won the lead-role in the International Munich Art Lab's first ever "Hip Hopera" (the musical "West End Opera").

== Career ==
Traue performed and toured with the production for four years, appearing on stages throughout Germany, Europe, and in New York City. Subsequently, Traue appeared in several films and television movies, such as Kleinruppin Forever, Berlin by the Sea, and Phantom Pain.

In 2008, Traue was chosen for the lead female role in the film Pandorum, a science fiction/thriller film directed by Christian Alvart, written by Travis Milloy, and starring Dennis Quaid and Ben Foster.

In 2013, Traue played villainess Faora-Ul in the Superman film Man of Steel, to positive reviews. In preparation for the role of Faora, Traue underwent an intense four-month training and dieting-program.

In 2014, Traue portrayed Bony Lizzie in the Universal Pictures action-fantasy film Seventh Son. She received critical acclaim in Germany for portraying the fictional character of Giselle Neumayer in the 2016 ARD-produced TV movie Fatal News, and nominations as best actress in German TV productions for 2016 both for her female lead roles in the miniseries Weinberg and Berlin 1. She has since been cast in several German and international movies and TV productions in lead-roles or recurrent supporting roles, including the 2017 movie Bye bye Germany alongside actor Moritz Bleibtreu directed by Sam Garbarski, and the 2017 Amazon series pilot episode Oasis. Traue's further acting appearances in 2017 and 2018 include the German Netflix series production Dark (as Agnes Nielsen), and German movies Das Ende der Wahrheit, Spielmacher, and Ballon. In 2019, Traue headlined the cast in the German ZDFneo TV miniseries Dead End.

Traue reprised her role as Faora-Ul in The Flash, released in 2023.

== Personal life ==
Traue was previously in a relationship with actor Ben Foster, moving to Los Angeles to live with him.

== Filmography ==
=== Film ===
Year	Title	Role	Notes
2000	Verlorene Kinder		TV movie
2003	Die Nacht davor	Franziska	Short
2004	Kleinruppin Forever	Ramona	
2005	202a	Jessica	Short
2006	Goldjunge	Manuela	Short
2007	Ego	Isabell	Short
2008	Berlin by the Sea	Estelle	
2009	Pandorum	Nadia	Female lead role
2009	Blau.Pause	Journalistin	Short
2011	5 Days of War	Zoe	
2012	Nobel's Last Will	Kitten	TV movie
2013	Man of Steel	Faora-Ul	Main role
2013	Aenne Comedia	Herself	Short
2014	Outlier	Gretchen / Red Widow	Short
2015	Seventh Son	Bony Lizzie	
2015	Berlin One	Irma Berger	TV movie/female lead role/German TV Awards Nomination of 2016: Best actress
2015	Fatal News	Giselle Neumayer	TV movie/female lead role
2015	Woman in Gold	Adele Bloch-Bauer	
2016	Despite the Falling Snow	Marina	
2016	Criminal	Elsa Mueller	
2016	Vier gegen die Bank	Zollner	Female lead role
2017	Bye bye Germany	Special Agent Sara Simon	Female lead role
2017	Old Agent Men	Paula Kern	Female lead role
2017	Oasis	Sara Keller	TV movie
2017	Rewind: Die zweite Chance	Zoé Gerbaulet	
2018	Das Ende der Wahrheit	Aurice Köhler	Cinema release May 2019
2018	Playmaker	Vera	Female lead role/also co-producer
2018	Balloon	Kindergarten teacher (Ulrike Piehl)	Directed by Michael 'Bully' Herbig
2019	Blame Game	Aurice Köhler	Lead role
2019	Die Freundin meiner Mutter	Rosalie / Viktoria's lover	NDR TV movie/comedy/lead role
2020	King of Ravens	Alina	
2021	Gefangen	Ellen	ARD crime drama TV movie/female lead role
2021	At His Side	Viola Frankenberg	TV movie
2022	Die Bilderkriegerin	Anja Niedringhaus	ZDF and Ziegler Film produced a drama movie - biopic crossover about the life and career of award-winning German photographer and journalist Anja Niedringhaus
2023	The Flash	Faora-Ul	
2025	Fall for Me	Bea	Netflix movie / in German

=== Television ===
Year	Title	Role	Notes
2007	Cologne P.D.	Diana Wrobel	Episode: "Später Ruhm"
2009	Der Staatsanwalt	Sandra Thewes	Episode: "Schwesternliebe"
2015	Weinberg (The Valley)	Hannah Zepter	Miniseries/female lead role/German TV Awards Nomination 2016: Best actress
2016	Berlin Station	Lana Vogel/Joker	TV series (2 episodes)
2016	Close to the Enemy	Bergit Mentz/Mentz	Miniseries
2016	Tempel	Eva	ZDFneo TV series/main role
2017–2020	Dark	Agnes Nielsen/Agnes Nielsen 1954	German Netflix TV series (S1E08-10, S2E03&08, S3E04&07)
2019	Dead End (CSI Mittenwalde)	Emma	ZDFneo TV mini series (6 episodes)/lead role
2019	Tod einer Journalistin	Anne Gerling	Polizeiruf 110 ARD Crime Series
2020	Tatort	Juliane Modica	Tatort series 50th anniversary (2 episodes, joining Tatort München and Tatort Dortmund teams)/female lead (episode 1 only)
2021	Am Anschlag - Die Macht der Kränkung	Eva	Miniseries
2022	Herzogpark	Elisabeth von Lynden	RTL/TVNow TV series/main cast
2024	Helgoland 513	Daniela	Sky TV series
