= Shamim Sarif =

British novelist and filmmaker (born 1969)

- Born: 24 September 1969 (age 56); London, England
- Occupations: Novelist, film director, screenwriter
- Spouse: Hanan Kattan (m. 2015)
- Children: 2
- Website: shamimsarif.com

Shamim Sarif (born 24 September 1969) is a British novelist, screenwriter, and film director of Indian South African heritage. Sarif is best known for her work in writing and directing films with themes that often explore issues of identity and cultural diversity.

== Early life and education ==
Sarif was born in London to Indian parents who had emigrated from South Africa in the early 1960s to escape apartheid. She studied English literature at Royal Holloway, University of London and later completed a Master's degree in English at Boston University.

== Career ==
Sarif's debut novel, The World Unseen (2001), won a Betty Trask Award in 2002 and the Pendleton May First Novel Award. The novel explores issues of race, gender and sexuality and was heavily inspired by the stories of Sarif's grandmother and her Indian and South African heritage.

Sarif has adapted and directed the films of three of her novels including The World Unseen (2001), which was selected for the Toronto International Film Festival, I Can't Think Straight (2008), and Despite the Falling Snow (2016). Also in (2023), Sarif wrote and directed the feature film Polarized, which won the People's Pick award at the 2023 Canadian Film Festival.

Her (2011) film The House of Tomorrow is a documentary about the 2010 TEDx Holy Land Conference, which brought together Arab and Israeli women to discuss issues of mutual interest in technology, entertainment, and design.

Her latest books, The Athena Protocol (2019) and The Shadow Mission (The Athena Protocol #2) (2020), represent a departure from her more familiar themes of romance and LGBTQ+ relationships, as it falls into the action-adventure and espionage genre.

Sarif and her wife founded the production company Enlightenment Productions.

Sarif also co-hosts The Enlightenment Podcast with her wife, Hanan Kattan.

In (2019) Sarif was invited to join the Academy of Motion Pictures Arts and Sciences.

In (2023) she directed an episode of the Netflix series You.

In (2025), she served as co-executive producer and directed an episode of the BBC drama The Split Up, starring Ritu Arya and Sanjeev Bhaskar. She also serves as lead director on the upcoming Netflix and WildBrain series Finding Her Edge, directing five of the show's eight episodes. The series premiered on January 22, 2026.

== Filmography ==
=== Film ===
Year	Title	Director	Writer	Notes
2007	The World Unseen	Yes	Yes	Feature film, adapted from Sarif's novel
2008	I Can't Think Straight	Yes	Yes	Feature film, based on Sarif's novel
2011	The House of Tomorrow	Yes	Yes	Documentary film
2016	Despite the Falling Snow	Yes	Yes	Feature film, also based on Sarif's novel
2020	Ann Rule's A House on Fire	Yes	No	TV film
2023	Polarized	Yes	Yes	Feature film

=== TV series ===
Year	Title	Director	Writer	Notes
2020	Murdoch Mysteries	Yes	No	directed episode: "Rigid Silence"
2021–2022	Diggstown	Yes	No	directed 3 episodes
2022	SkyMed	Yes	No	directed 2 episodes
2023	You	Yes	No	directed episode: "Eat the Rich"
2023	Moonshine	Yes	No	directed 2 episodes
2023	Sort of	Yes	No	directed 4 episodes
2023–2024	The Way Home	Yes	No	directed 6 episodes
2024	Sullivan's Crossing	Yes	No	directed 2 episodes
2026	Finding Her Edge	Yes	No	directed 5 episodes
TBA	The Split Up	Yes	No	Also co-executive producer

== Bibliography ==
- The World Unseen (2001)
- Despite the Falling Snow (2004)
- I Can't Think Straight (2008)
- The Athena Protocol (2019)
- The Shadow Mission (The Athena Protocol #2) (2020)

== See also ==
- List of Indian women film directors
- List of Indian women screenwriters
- List of female film and television directors
- List of lesbian filmmakers
- List of LGBT-related films directed by women
