= Rebecca Ferguson =

Swedish actress (born 1983)

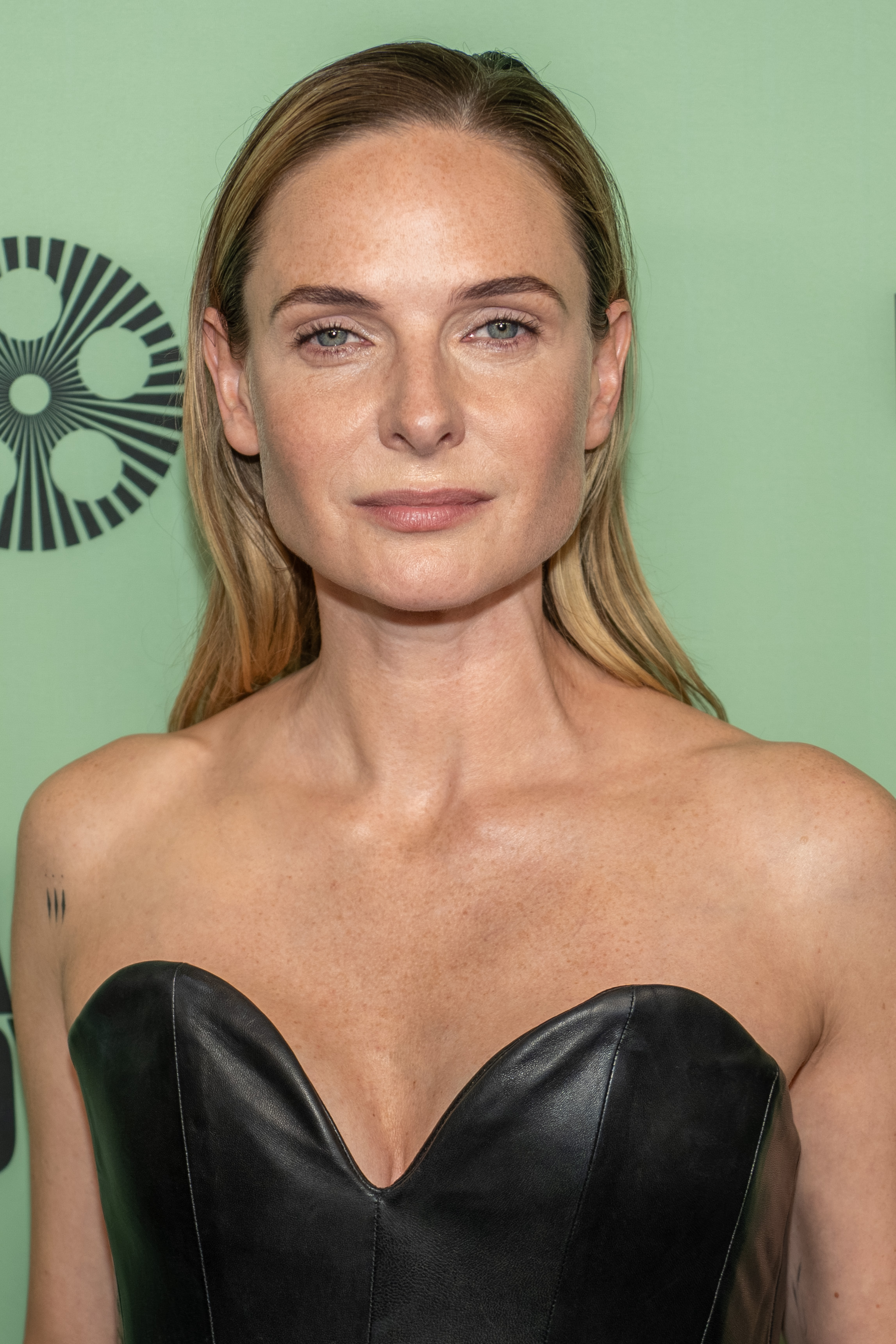
- Ferguson in 2025
- Born: Rebecca Louisa Ferguson Sundström; 19 October 1983 (age 43); Stockholm, Sweden
- Education: Adolf Fredrik's Music School
- Occupation: Actress
- Years active: 1999–present
- Spouse: Rory St. Clair Gainer (m. 2018)
- Partner: Ludwig Hallberg (2005–2015)
- Children: 2

Rebecca Louisa Ferguson Sundström (Swedish: [rɛˈbɛ̂kːa lʊˈîːsa ˈfæ̂rɡɵˌsɔn ˈsɵ̂nːstrœm]; born 19 October 1983) is a Swedish (Note: Ferguson identifies herself only as Swedish.) actress. Known for her roles on film and television, she is the recipient of several accolades, including a Saturn Award and two Critics' Choice Super Awards, in addition to nominations for a Golden Globe and a Critics' Choice Movie Award.

Born to a British mother and a Swedish father, Ferguson began her television career in 1999 with the Swedish soap opera Nya tider and made her big screen debut in 2004 with the slasher film Drowning Ghost. She came to international prominence with her portrayal of Elizabeth Woodville in the British drama series The White Queen (2013), for which she was nominated for a Golden Globe Award for Best Actress in a Miniseries or Television Film.

In American cinema, Ferguson portrayed MI6 agent Ilsa Faust, opposite Tom Cruise, in three of the Mission: Impossible films: Rogue Nation (2015), Fallout (2018), and Dead Reckoning (2023), and Lady Jessica in the science fiction films Dune (2021) and Dune: Part Two (2024), winning her a Saturn Award for Best Supporting Actress, as well as in the upcoming Dune: Part Three (2026). She also appeared in the films The Girl on the Train (2016), The Greatest Showman (2017), Doctor Sleep (2019), A House of Dynamite (2025), and Peaky Blinders: The Immortal Man (2026). On television, she starred in the Apple TV+ science fiction series Silo (2023–2026), which earned her Saturn Award and Satellite Award nominations.

== Early life and education ==
Rebecca Louisa Ferguson Sundström was born on 19 October 1983 in Stockholm, and grew up in the city's Vasastan district. Her mother, Rosemary Ferguson, is English, and moved from Britain to Sweden at age 25. Her mother helped ABBA translate the lyrics from their 1974 album Waterloo into English and also appeared on the sleeve of the band's 1975 self-titled album. Her father, Olov Sundström, is a Swedish businessman. Her parents never married and separated when she was 3 years old. Ferguson took her mother's surname as her stage name. Her maternal grandmother is Northern Irish, and her maternal grandfather is Scottish.

Ferguson attended an English-medium school in Sweden and was raised bilingual, speaking Swedish and English. She attended the Adolf Fredrik's Music School in Stockholm and graduated in 1999.

Ferguson was briefly signed to a modeling agency in her youth after her mother decided that she should be a model, but she disliked being photographed and turned down jobs. The modelling agency placed Ferguson in a portfolio titled "normal people" due to her not being tall nor skinny enough for modelling. Her portfolio helped her get cast in her first acting job after it was found by a casting agency for a soap opera in Sweden. Ferguson then started her acting career at age 15. Unsure if she wanted to act, Ferguson took other casual work, including working at a nursery and at a daycare centre as a nanny, in retail stores, at a Korean restaurant, and as a cleaner in a hotel.

Ferguson has danced from a very early age; she danced ballet, tap-dancing, jazz, street funk, and tango. She taught Argentine tango at a dance company in Lund, Sweden for a few years while she continued her work on several short art film projects.

== Career ==
=== Beginnings ===
Ferguson came to prominence as upper-class girl Anna Gripenhielm in the Swedish soap opera Nya tider (1999–2000). She went on to later play Chrissy Eriksson in the Swedish-American soap Ocean Ave. (2002). In 2004, she made her feature film debut in Mikael Håfström's horror film Drowning Ghost and later had a guest role in Wallander (2008). Swedish director Richard Hobert spotted her at the Simrishamn town market in 2011, which led to her starring in his film A One-way Trip to Antibes, which earned her a nomination for the Rising Star award at the Stockholm International Film Festival. In 2013, she co-starred in the film Us alongside Gustaf Skarsgård.

In August 2012, it was announced Ferguson had been cast to play Elizabeth Woodville in the ten-part BBC historical television drama The White Queen (2013), based on Philippa Gregory's The Cousins' War novels about the women of the Wars of the Roses. Ferguson's performance in The White Queen was met with critical praise, and earned her a Golden Globe Award nomination for Best Actress in a Miniseries or Television Film. Her first Hollywood role was against Dwayne Johnson in Hercules (2014).

=== Recognition ===
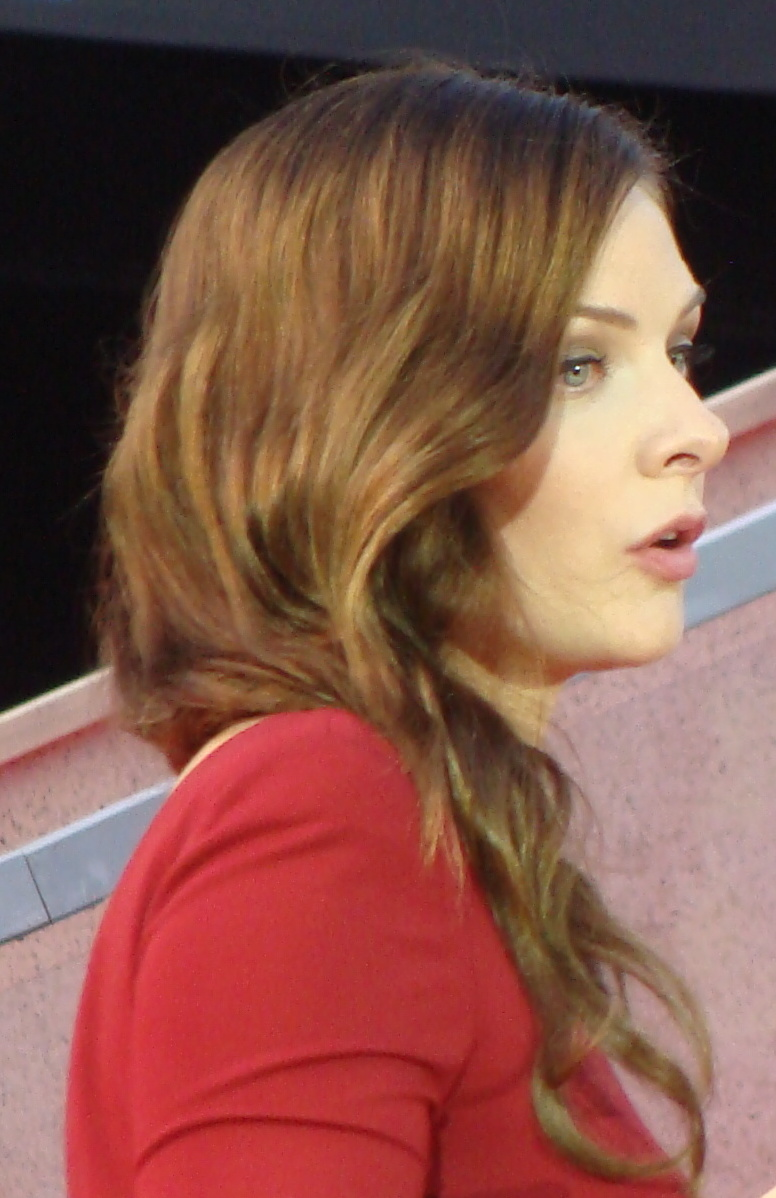
Ferguson at the world premiere of Mission: Impossible – Rogue Nation in Vienna in 2015

In 2015, Ferguson gained wider recognition for her portrayal of MI6 agent Ilsa Faust, the female lead in the fifth Mission: Impossible film, Mission: Impossible – Rogue Nation, for which she received critical acclaim. Tom Cruise handpicked Ferguson to star opposite him in the film after watching her in The White Queen and noticing a resemblance between Ferguson and Ingrid Bergman. She reprised her role in the sixth Mission: Impossible film, Mission: Impossible – Fallout, released in 2018 – her biggest commercial success, grossing over $790 million worldwide – and reprised it again in the seventh film, Mission: Impossible – Dead Reckoning Part One, in 2023.

In 2016, she played the dual roles of Katya and Lauren in the Cold War espionage thriller directed by Shamim Sarif, Despite the Falling Snow, opposite Sam Reid and Charles Dance. For her performance in the film, she won the Best Actress award at the 2016 Prague Independent Film Festival. Later that same year, Ferguson appeared in Stephen Frears's Florence Foster Jenkins opposite Meryl Streep and Hugh Grant, and Tate Taylor's thriller book adaptation The Girl on the Train starring Emily Blunt. In 2017, Ferguson played the female lead in Daniel Espinosa's sci-fi horror Life, opposite Jake Gyllenhaal and Ryan Reynolds, co-starred in Tomas Alfredson's crime thriller The Snowman, alongside Michael Fassbender and Charlotte Gainsbourg, and starred as Swedish opera singer Jenny Lind in the musical film The Greatest Showman, with Hugh Jackman and Michelle Williams.

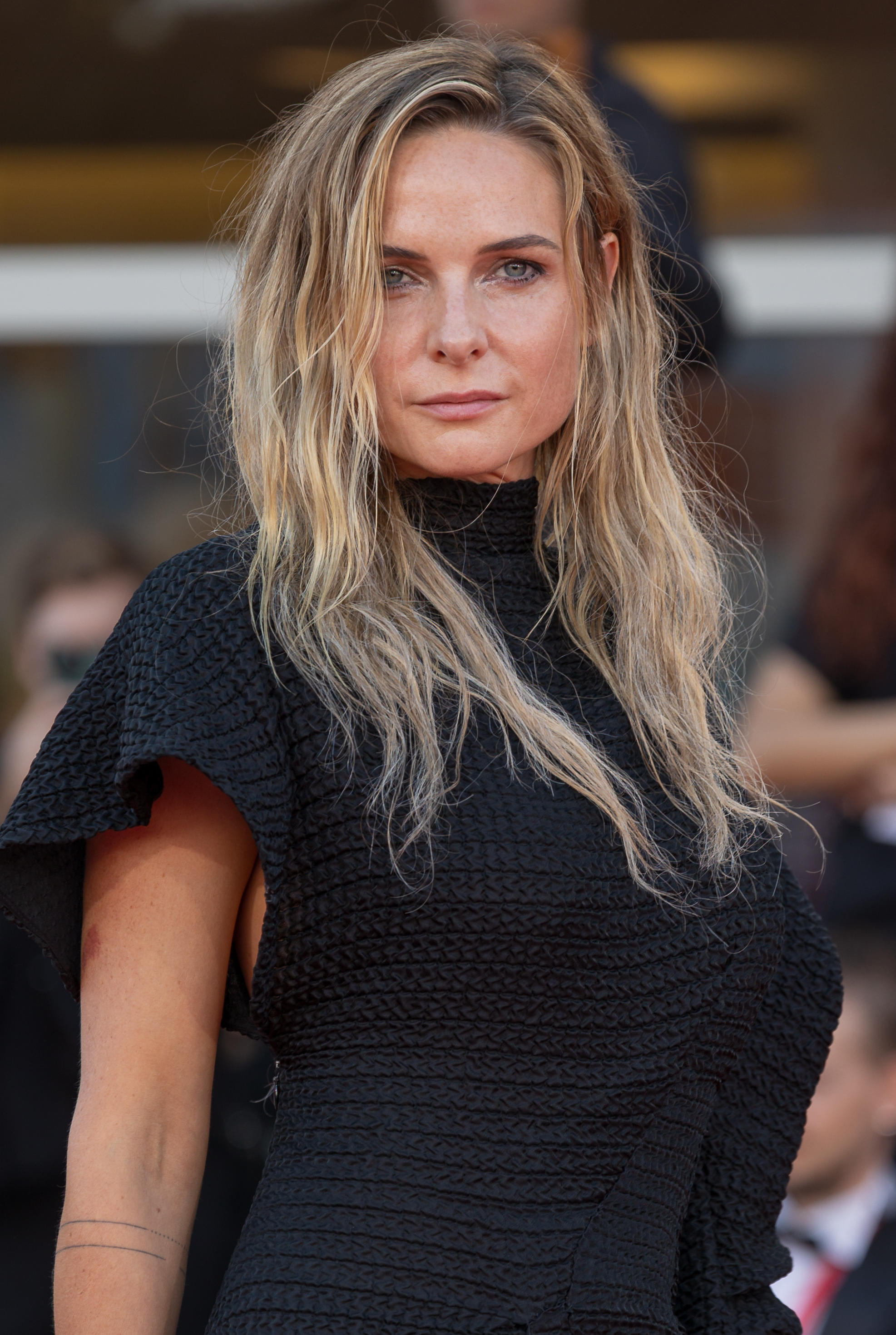
Ferguson at the 2025 Venice Film Festival

In 2019, Ferguson had several major film roles. She co-starred in Doctor Sleep, the adaptation of Stephen King's novel of the same name; played the villain Morgana in Joe Cornish's adventure film The Kid Who Would Be King; and co-starred as Riza Stavros in F. Gary Gray's science fiction comedy film Men in Black: International. In 2021, she co-starred in Lisa Joy's science fiction thriller Reminiscence.

Denis Villeneuve cast her as Lady Jessica in his film adaptation of Frank Herbert's science fiction novel Dune, playing the role in both Dune (2021) and Dune: Part Two (2024).

In 2023, Ferguson starred in and executive produced the Apple TV+ science fiction series Silo. The same year, Ferguson narrated the BBC wildlife documentary Wild Scandinavia.

== Personal life ==
Ferguson is claustrophobic and refuses to use elevators.

In 2004, Ferguson spent time in Thailand, where she earned a diving certificate and considered becoming a diving instructor.

In 2007, Ferguson gave birth to her first child, a son, with her then-boyfriend Ludwig Hallberg, a psychosynthesis therapist. After her soap opera success and the birth of their son, she moved with Hallberg to Simrishamn, on the Swedish southeast coast. In 2012, Ferguson and Hallberg taught tango together in Österlen. Ferguson and Hallberg separated in April 2015.

Since 2016, Ferguson has been in a relationship with businessman Rory St. Clair Gainer, with whom she has a daughter who was born in May 2018. They married in December 2018 and have a house in Richmond, southwest London, owing to its proximity to Pinewood and Shepperton studios. Ferguson splits her time between London and a fishing village in Sweden, where her son lives with his father, and she maintains a close relationship with both of them.

Ferguson has a preference for going barefoot, a habit that influenced her creative choices for the costume of Rose the Hat in Doctor Sleep (2019).

== Filmography ==
Key
†	Denotes works that have not yet been released

=== Film ===
Film
Year	Title	Role	Notes	Ref.
2004	Drowning Ghost	Amanda		
2010	Lennart	Home care personnel	Short film	
2010	Puls	Linda	Short film	
2011	Irresistible	Woman	Short film	
2011	A One-Way Trip to Antibes	Maria		
2013	Us	Linda		
2014	Hercules	Ergenia		
2015	Mission: Impossible – Rogue Nation	Ilsa Faust		
2016	Despite the Falling Snow	Katya Grinkova / Lauren Grinkova		
2016	Florence Foster Jenkins	Kathleen Weatherley		
2016	The Girl on the Train	Anna Watson		
2017	Life	Miranda North		
2017	The Snowman	Katrine Bratt		
2017	The Greatest Showman	Jenny Lind		
2018	Little Match Girl	Mother	Short film	
2018	Mission: Impossible – Fallout	Ilsa Faust		
2019	Doctor Sleep	Rose O'Hara / Rose the Hat		
2019	The Kid Who Would Be King	Morgana		
2019	Men in Black: International	Riza Stavros		
2020	Cold Night	Jenny Sorensen	Filmed in 2008	
2021	Reminiscence	Mae		
2021	Dune	Lady Jessica		
2023	Mission: Impossible – Dead Reckoning Part One	Ilsa Faust		
2024	Dune: Part Two	Lady Jessica		
2025	A House of Dynamite	Capt. Olivia "Liv" Walker		
2026	Mercy	Judge Maddox		
2026	Peaky Blinders: The Immortal Man	Kaulo Chiriklo / Zelda Chiriklo		
2026	The Magic Faraway Tree	Dame Snap		
2026	Dune: Part Three †	Lady Jessica	Post-production	
TBA	Honeymoon / Funeral †	TBA	Filming	

=== Television ===
Television
Year	Title	Role	Notes	Ref.
1999–2000	Nya tider	Anna Gripenhielm	54 episodes	
2002	Ocean Ave.	Chrissy Eriksson	Main role	
2008	Wallander	Louise Fredman	Episode: "Sidetracked"	
2013	The Inspector and the Sea	Jasmine Larsson	Episode: "Der Wolf im Schafspelz"	
2013	The White Queen	Elizabeth Woodville	Main role (miniseries)	
2013	The Vatican	Olivia Borghese	Television film	
2014	The Red Tent	Dinah	Main role (miniseries)	
2023–present	Silo	Juliette Nichols	Main role; also executive producer	
2023	Wild Scandinavia	Narrator	Three-part wildlife series	

=== Podcast ===
Year	Title	Role	Ref
2022	Spark Hunter	Her (voice)	

== Awards and nominations ==
Year	Award	Category	Nominated work	Result	Ref.
2011	Stockholm International Film Festival	Rising Star Award	A One-way Trip to Antibes	Nominated	
2013	Stockholm International Film Festival	Rising Star Award	VI	Nominated	
2014	Golden Globe Awards	Best Actress – Miniseries or Television Film	The White Queen	Nominated	
2015	Hamptons International Film Festival	Breakthrough Performer	Mission: Impossible – Rogue Nation	Won	
2016	Buffalo International Film Festival	Best Actress in a Leading Role	Despite the Falling Snow	Won	
2016	California Independent Film Festival	Best Actress	Despite the Falling Snow	Won	
2016	Critics' Choice Awards	Best Actress in an Action Movie	Mission: Impossible – Rogue Nation	Nominated	
2016	Empire Awards	Best Female Newcomer	Mission: Impossible – Rogue Nation	Nominated	
2016	Online Film & Television Association	Best Breakthrough Performance: Female	Mission: Impossible – Rogue Nation	Nominated	
2016	Prague Independent Film Festival	Best Actress	Despite the Falling Snow	Won	
2019	Fright Meter Awards	Best Supporting Actress	Doctor Sleep	Won	
2019	Seattle Film Critics Society	Villain of the Year	Doctor Sleep	Nominated	
2019	Utah Film Critics Association	Best Supporting Actress	Doctor Sleep	Runner-up	
2019	Women Film Critics Circle	Best Actress	Doctor Sleep	Nominated	
2020	Fangoria Chainsaw Awards	Best Supporting Actress	Doctor Sleep	Won	
2021	Saturn Awards	Best Actress	Doctor Sleep	Nominated	
2022	Göteborg Film Festival	Nordic Honorary Dragon Award	—N/a	Won	
2022	Critics' Choice Super Awards	Best Actress in a Science Fiction/Fantasy Movie	Dune	Won	
2024	Saturn Awards	Best Actress in a Television Series	Silo	Nominated	
2024	Satellite Awards	Best Actress in a Series	Silo	Nominated	
2024	Astra Midseason Movie Awards	Best Supporting Actress	Dune: Part Two	Nominated	
2025	Saturn Awards	Best Supporting Actress	Dune: Part Two	Won	

== See also ==
- List of barefooters
- List of Swedish actors
