= Berried Alive =

- Entourage episode
- Episode no.: Season 6 Episode 10
- Directed by: David Nutter
- Written by: Doug Ellin
- Cinematography by: Rob Sweeney
- Editing by: Jeff Groth
- Original release date: September 20, 2009
- Running time: 28 minutes

Guest appearances
- Jamie-Lynn Sigler as Herself (special guest star); William Fichtner as Phil Yagoda (special guest star); Alexis Dziena as Ashley Brooks; Jordan Belfi as Adam Davies; Kate Mara as Brittany; Matt Letscher as Dan Coakley; Brandon Quinn as Tom; Jana Kramer as Brooke Manning

Episode chronology
← Previous "Security Briefs"	Next → "Scared Straight"

"Berried Alive" is the tenth episode of the sixth season of the American comedy-drama television series Entourage. It is the 76th overall episode of the series and was written by series creator Doug Ellin, and directed by David Nutter. It originally aired on HBO on September 20, 2009.

The series chronicles the acting career of Vincent Chase, a young A-list movie star, and his childhood friends from Queens, New York City, as they attempt to further their nascent careers in Los Angeles. In the episode, Drama debates over whether getting Ari or Lloyd as his agent, while Eric questions his relationship with Ashley.

According to Nielsen Media Research, the episode was seen by an estimated 1.83 million household viewers and gained a 1.1/3 ratings share among adults aged 18–49. The episode received positive reviews from critics, who praised the storylines and new focus on Lloyd.

== Plot ==
Drama (Kevin Dillon) grows disillusioned with Five Towns, especially as Coakley continues humiliating him. While dining with the boys, Drama is approached by Phil Yagoda (William Fichtner), a producer who fired him from Melrose Place. With the incoming revival, Yagoda offers him a role in the series if he can leave his Five Towns contract. Drama contacts Lloyd (Rex Lee), his agent, but is frustrated to learn he quit Miller Gold. He asks him to get his contract finished at Five Towns, offering to remain as his client if he gets it.

Ari (Jeremy Piven) is angry when Drama informs him that Lloyd is now working for Adam Davies (Jordan Belfi), but agrees to help Drama with Coakley (Matt Letscher). Ari is faster than Lloyd and convinces Coakley in getting Drama out of his contract by bribing him, prompting Drama to choose Ari as his agent. An upset Lloyd visits Drama, telling him he remains his only client and promising to prioritize him, also warning him that Ari does not believe in his talent. Drama confronts Ari over his view of him as an actor, and Ari allows Drama to leave with Lloyd.

Eric (Kevin Connolly) is taken aback when Ashley (Alexis Dziena) asks to read his e-mails, claiming that it is to build trust between them. The tensions arise as Ashley suspects that Eric is interested in his assistant, Brittany (Kate Mara). When she repeats this behavior at a restaurant, Eric decides he had enough and breaks up with her. Turtle (Jerry Ferrara) impresses the sorority girls when Jamie-Lynn Sigler takes him to the campus, and when he is revealed to be friends with Vince (Adrian Grenier). Later, Sigler tells Turtle that she got the lead on a TV series, but he is dismayed when she tells him it will be filmed in New Zealand.

== Production ==
=== Development ===
The episode was written by series creator Doug Ellin, and directed by David Nutter. This was Ellin's 49th writing credit, and Nutter's fourth directing credit.

== Reception ==
=== Viewers ===
In its original American broadcast, "Berried Alive" was seen by an estimated 1.83 million household viewers with a 1.1/3 in the 18–49 demographics. This means that 1.1 percent of all households with televisions watched the episode, while 3 percent of all of those watching television at the time of the broadcast watched it. This was a 30% decrease in viewership with the previous episode, which was watched by an estimated 2.60 million household viewers with a 1.6/4 in the 18–49 demographics.

=== Critical reviews ===
"Berried Alive" received positive reviews from critics. Ahsan Haque of IGN gave the episode a "great" 8.5 out of 10 and wrote, "The only real negative here is that once again, Vince seems to be very much a background character in this episode. I know he's waiting on filming to resume in his movie, but it would be nice to see some form of focus on him this season. I know the emphasis has been on Turtle's education, Eric's new job as an agent, and Drama's new career move, but it seems like there should have been a way to fit more Vince in here. Otherwise this was yet another solid episode of Entourage that finally gave us a look at Lloyd step out on his own. He'll undoubtedly make a great agent, and Ari will surely try to find a way to bring him back to his agency."

Josh Modell of The A.V. Club gave the episode a "B" grade and wrote, "I have to say, as this season goes on, it's getting more and more palatable and less and less ambitious — and maybe that's the right formula. Or maybe it's just that this episode finally made good on a situation that's been boiling since the beginning: Lloyd versus Ari in an agent-powered grudge match." Emily Christner of TV Guide wrote, "The show ends when Jamie calls Turtle to tell him she got a lead TV role other than the one she wanted, and that it shoots in New Zealand. Is the end near for Turtle and Jamie?"

Jonathan Toomey of TV Squad wrote, "Beyond the Lloyd plot, this was probably the strongest episode of the season. The whole jealous girlfriend plot that both Turtle and Eric are wrapped up in became surprising enjoyable." Eric Hochberger of TV Fanatic wrote, "Last night's episode of Entourage was definitely one of our favorites of this somewhat disappointing season."

William Fichtner submitted this episode for consideration for Outstanding Guest Actor in a Comedy Series, while David Nutter submitted it for Outstanding Directing for a Comedy Series at the 62nd Primetime Emmy Awards.
