= Runnin' on E =

- Entourage episode
- Episode no.: Season 6 Episode 4
- Directed by: Ken Whittingham
- Written by: Doug Ellin; Ally Musika
- Cinematography by: Anthony Hardwick
- Editing by: Steven Sprung
- Original release date: August 2, 2009
- Running time: 30 minutes

Guest appearances
- David Schwimmer as Himself (special guest star); Jamie-Lynn Sigler as Herself (special guest star); Edward Burns as Himself (special guest star); Timothy Busfield as Himself (special guest star); Alexis Dziena as Ashley Brooks; Jami Gertz as Marlo Klein; Autumn Reeser as Lizzie Grant; Cassidy Lehrman as Sarah Gold; Beverly Sanders as Eric's Receptionist; Emily Paul as Nikki; Stephanie Vogt as Liz

Episode chronology
← Previous "One Car, Two Car, Red Car, Blue Car"	Next → "Fore!"

"Runnin' on E" is the fourth episode of the sixth season of the American comedy-drama television series Entourage. It is the 70th overall episode of the series and was written by series creator Doug Ellin and executive producer Ally Musika, and directed by Ken Whittingham. It originally aired on HBO on August 2, 2009.

The series chronicles the acting career of Vincent Chase, a young A-list movie star, and his childhood friends from Queens, New York City, as they attempt to further their nascent careers in Los Angeles. In the episode, Vince tries to find ways to kill time when the Ferrari biopic is delayed. Meanwhile, Eric considers his job, Turtle goes shopping as he prepares for college, Drama tries to find an actress for his series, and Ari tries to prevent Andrew from ruining his life.

According to Nielsen Media Research, the episode was seen by an estimated 3.30 million household viewers and gained a 1.9/6 ratings share among adults aged 18–49. The episode received extremely positive reviews from critics, although the disjointed storylines earned frustration from some critics.

== Plot ==
Gatsby becomes a critical and commercial success, but Ari (Jeremy Piven) informs Eric (Kevin Connolly) that Enzo Ferrari's biopic will be delayed by 12 weeks after a storm destroyed the sets in Malta. When his friends cannot accompany him on vacation, Vince (Adrian Grenier) tries to find ways to entertain himself. He creates a Facebook profile to get into contact with a childhood friend, and has sex with a waitress.

Ari confronts Andrew (Gary Cole) at the office, as Marlo (Jami Gertz) called Melissa (Perrey Reeves) as he didn't arrive home by night. Andrew confirms he was seeing Lizzie (Autumn Reeser), but that the affair is over, and that he is focused in getting Aaron Sorkin signed as a client. When David Schwimmer visits the office to look for some pitches for a TV series, he grows disappointed with all the options. However, he becomes smitten with Lizzie and accepts to give her pitch a chance. Ari later finds Andrew crying in the parking lot, and forces him in stepping up and trying to think of what his children may think of him. Andrew accepts, but Ari later discovers that Andrew has decided to leave his family.

Eric gets bored by his daily routine at the office and invites Ashley (Alexis Dziena) over lunch, although they end up having sex instead. Eric expresses frustration that he cannot successfully sign clients, but Ashley states that having Vince as talent is very important. While Turtle (Jerry Ferrara) goes shopping with Jamie-Lynn Sigler to prepare for college, Drama (Kevin Dillon) auditions girls for a kissing scene in Five Towns. However, Drama is not thrilled with any of the choices and struggles in finding a replacement in time. Later on, however, Turtle tells Drama that he got Sigler in accepting to take the role, delighting him.

== Production ==
=== Development ===
The episode was written by series creator Doug Ellin and executive producer Ally Musika, and directed by Ken Whittingham. This was Ellin's 45th writing credit, Musika's ninth writing credit, and Whittingham's eighth directing credit.

== Reception ==
=== Viewers ===
In its original American broadcast, "Runnnin' on E" was seen by an estimated 3.30 million household viewers with a 1.9/6 in the 18–49 demographics. This means that 1.9 percent of all households with televisions watched the episode, while 6 percent of all of those watching television at the time of the broadcast watched it. In comparison, the previous episode gained a 1.6/5 ratings share in the 18–49 demographics.

=== Critical reviews ===
"Runnin' on E" received extremely positive reviews from critics. Ahsan Haque of IGN gave the episode an "amazing" 9.4 out of 10 and wrote, "Overall, this was another excellent episode. Featuring some great laughs, really memorable character moments, a great cameo appearance, and some intriguing plot developments, this episode seems to have it all."

Josh Modell of The A.V. Club gave the episode a "C" grade and wrote, "a bunch of shit from this week's Entourge that I didn't need to see at all: Eric hanging out bored in his office, then inviting his girl over for some afternoon delight. Turtle shopping for clothes with his girlfriend. Drama lip-raping a bunch of girls. Vince so bored he fucks a waitress. The only thing that could've made these four things worse was if they were all happening in the same room, and we could see Eric's post-coital treasure trail. All of these subplots: Fail. And it was a good chunk of the episode. The only redeeming part was when Ed Burns told Drama that his big ordeal was “one scene in an episode of a middling NBC drama.” Amen, brother."

Emily Christner of TV Guide wrote, "Some of the funnier moments included Vince discovering the joys of Facebook, Drama convincing Turtle to lend him his girlfriend for the part on his show and Turtle wearing an argyle sweater. Or maybe it's just me that thought that part was amusing." Jonathan Toomey of TV Squad wrote, "This is shaping up to be a helluva season for Entourage. Only four episodes in, and it feels like a completely different show than we're used to. Rather than wallowing in endless "woe is me plots" (every character on the show has been guilty of them in the five previous seasons), things feel fresh and the characters are growing up. Plus, instead of making me constantly laugh, Entourage is making me do something I never expected - think."

Timothy Busfield submitted this episode for consideration for Outstanding Guest Actor in a Comedy Series at the 62nd Primetime Emmy Awards.
