= Scared Straight (Entourage) =

- Entourage episode
- Episode no.: Season 6 Episode 11
- Directed by: Mark Mylod
- Written by: Doug Ellin
- Cinematography by: Todd A. Dos Reis
- Editing by: Jeff Groth
- Original release date: September 27, 2009
- Running time: 29 minutes

Guest appearances
- Beverly D'Angelo as Barbara Miller (special guest star); Jamie-Lynn Sigler as Herself (special guest star); Melinda Clarke as Herself (special guest star); David Faustino as Himself (special guest star); Dean Cain as Himself (special guest star); William Fichtner as Phil Yagoda (special guest star); William Forsythe as Eddie Kapowski (special guest star); Malcolm McDowell as Terrence McQuewick (special guest star); Scott Caan as Scott Lavin; Jordan Belfi as Adam Davies; Kate Mara as Brittany; Ron Marasco as Doctor #1; Peter Siragusa as Doctor #2; Barrett Foa as Matt Wolpert; Jonathan Keltz as Jake Steinberg; Erica Taylor as Nurse

Episode chronology
← Previous "Berried Alive"	Next → "Give a Little Bit"

"Scared Straight" is the eleventh episode of the sixth season of the American comedy-drama television series Entourage. It is the 77th overall episode of the series and was written by series creator Doug Ellin, and directed by co-executive producer Mark Mylod. It originally aired on HBO on September 27, 2009.

The series chronicles the acting career of Vincent Chase, a young A-list movie star, and his childhood friends from Queens, New York City, as they attempt to further their nascent careers in Los Angeles. In the episode, Drama panics before his audition for his new show, while Turtle and Jamie-Lynn Sigler debate on their relationship just before she leaves.

According to Nielsen Media Research, the episode was seen by an estimated 1.87 million household viewers and gained a 1.1/3 ratings share among adults aged 18–49. The episode received extremely positive reviews from critics, who praised the deviation from Vince's storylines, although Eric's decision received mixed reviews.

== Plot ==
Eric (Kevin Connolly) is distraught when he realizes that he was having sex with a woman who previously had sex with Drama (Kevin Dillon). He immediately goes to the doctor for a diagnosis, but the doctor does not find anything wrong with him, although the official results will have to wait a few days.

Drama attends his Melrose 2009 audition, although he feels stressed out when he finds Dean Cain and David Faustino are also competing for his role, and when he finds that he shares a bad history with the director. During his audition, he panics and while talking to Vince (Adrian Grenier), he believes he experiences a heart attack. Vince takes him to the doctor, and Drama is diagnosed with Takotsubo cardiomyopathy, result of emotional stress. Despite still having an audition, Drama informs Lloyd (Rex Lee) that he will pass on Melrose 2009 to reconsider his career. Before leaving for New Zealand, Jamie-Lynn Sigler decides to break up with Turtle (Jerry Ferrara), feeling that long-distance relationships will not work.

Terrence (Malcolm McDowell) visits Ari (Jeremy Piven), offering Miller Gold the chance to buy his agency for $100 million. While Ari and Andrew (Gary Cole) are interested, Barbara (Beverly D'Angelo) is unwilling to spend that much and wonders why Terrence wants it to stay a secret. Ari visits Terrence's wife, Melinda Clarke, and realizes that they are divorcing, and that Terrence was hoping the merger would bury the news. He visits Terrence, who is forced to lower his offer to $75 million. The boys reunite to discuss the events, with Eric revealing that his condition is fine. He decides that he wants to spend his life with Sloan.

== Production ==
=== Development ===
The episode was written by series creator Doug Ellin, and directed by co-executive producer Mark Mylod. This was Ellin's 50th writing credit, and Mylod's 22nd directing credit.

== Reception ==
=== Viewers ===
In its original American broadcast, "Scared Straight" was seen by an estimated 1.87 million household viewers with a 1.1/3 in the 18–49 demographics. This means that 1.1 percent of all households with televisions watched the episode, while 3 percent of all of those watching television at the time of the broadcast watched it. This was a slight increase in viewership with the previous episode, which was watched by an estimated 1.83 million household viewers with a 1.6/4 in the 18–49 demographics.

=== Critical reviews ===
"Scared Straight" received extremely positive reviews from critics. Ahsan Haque of IGN gave the episode an "amazing" 9 out of 10 and wrote, "Overall, while it might seem that this season's trudged along fairly aimlessly, it's really done a good job on taking the focus off of Vince and let his buddies take the spotlight. Also, watching Ari go through more assistants than Darth Vader went through admirals in The Empire Strikes Back was priceless, and was definitely the funniest running joke of the episode. With only one more episode to go in the season, it'll be interesting to see where things go from here."

Josh Modell of The A.V. Club gave the episode a "B–" grade and wrote, "there wasn't much build up to next week's season finale, and my TiVo didn't get the 'next week on,' so I can only imagine the machines that will be put in motion to get these guys back to their original starting place for another season next year. But seriously, let's leave Sloan out of it, okay?"

Emily Christner of TV Guide wrote, "There's a lot of drama in this episode and, once again, Vince's career is no longer the focus. The writers seem to be staying away from that path a little more this season after the boring and even depressing plotlines of the past couple seasons that strayed from the comedy of it all and focused too much on the rise and fall of Vince." Jonathan Toomey of TV Squad wrote, "One down and one to go in Entourage's sixth season - a season I should point out that started off incredibly strong and ended up flopping around like a dead fish after those first few stellar eps. However, last week's installment, "Berried Alive," redeemed much of what had been bad and for the most part, "Scared Straight" continued that trend."

Jamie-Lynn Sigler submitted this episode for consideration for Outstanding Guest Actress in a Comedy Series at the 62nd Primetime Emmy Awards.
