= Amongst Friends (Entourage) =

- Entourage episode
- Episode no.: Season 6 Episode 2
- Directed by: Mark Mylod
- Written by: Ally Musika
- Cinematography by: Rob Sweeney
- Editing by: Jeff Groth
- Original release date: July 19, 2009
- Running time: 27 minutes

Guest appearances
- Jamie-Lynn Sigler as Herself (special guest star); Alexis Dziena as Ashley Brooks; Jami Gertz as Marlo Klein; Autumn Reeser as Lizzie Grant; Azita Ghanizada as Kelly; Gal Gadot as Lisa

Episode chronology
← Previous "Drive"	Next → "One Car, Two Car, Red Car, Blue Car"

"Amongst Friends" is the second episode of the sixth season of the American comedy-drama television series Entourage. It is the 68th overall episode of the series and was written by executive producer Ally Musika, and directed by co-executive producer Mark Mylod. It originally aired on HBO on July 19, 2009.

The series chronicles the acting career of Vincent Chase, a young A-list movie star, and his childhood friends from Queens, New York City, as they attempt to further their nascent careers in Los Angeles. In the episode, the boys attend the Gatsby premiere, while Ari discovers a secret from Andrew that could derail his marriage.

According to Nielsen Media Research, the episode was seen by an estimated 2.69 million household viewers and gained a 1.6/5 ratings share among adults aged 18–49. The episode received positive reviews from critics, who considered it an improvement over the premiere.

== Plot ==
Vince (Adrian Grenier), Turtle (Jerry Ferrara) and Drama (Kevin Dillon) help Eric (Kevin Connolly) in moving to his new house. Needing dates for the Gatsby premiere, Eric asks Sloan (Emmanuelle Chriqui) to accompany him, Vince takes a woman named Lisa (Gal Gadot), and Turtle will be taking Jamie-Lynn Sigler. Realizing he is the only one without a date, Drama decides to ask a clerk named Kelly (Azita Ghanizada), who accepts his invitation.

As Ari (Jeremy Piven) and Andrew (Gary Cole) prepare for the premiere, Ari asks Melissa (Perrey Reeves) to hang out with Andrew's wife, Marlo (Jami Gertz), before the premiere. While Melissa and Marlo quickly become friends, Ari is annoyed when he finds that Andrew has taken an interest in one of his young agent employees, Lizzie Grant (Autumn Reeser), at Miller Gold, and warns him to not go forward with it. During this, Lloyd (Rex Lee) is seen undergoing a crash diet, as Ari has demanded that he lose weight for his promotion. When pressed by the boys, Eric reaffirms that he is just friends with Sloan, although he has developed feelings for his neighbor, Ashley (Alexis Dziena). At the premiere, Eric is surprised when he runs into Ashley.

At the red carpet, Sigler surprises the media by announcing her relationship with Turtle and they share a kiss in front of the cameras. Realizing that Andrew went ahead with the affair, Ari chastises him and instructs him to stop it for the sake of his marriage. Eventually, Eric confesses to Sloan that he wants to go back to their relationship. However, Sloan turns him down, feeling she is not ready for it and leaves. After the premiere, the boys return to the mansion to celebrate, although Eric is not content with the events. They motivate him in pursuing Ashley, and he finally decides to visit her. As he walks out, he receives a text from Sloan apologizing. Eric deletes it and leaves the mansion.

== Production ==
=== Development ===
The episode was written by Ally Musika, and directed by co-executive producer Mark Mylod. This was Musika's eighth writing credit, and Mylod's 18th directing credit.

== Reception ==
=== Viewers ===
In its original American broadcast, "Amongst Friends" was seen by an estimated 2.69 million household viewers with a 1.6/5 in the 18–49 demographics. This means that 1.6 percent of all households with televisions watched the episode, while 5 percent of all of those watching television at the time of the broadcast watched it. This was a 21% decrease in viewership with the previous episode, which was watched by an estimated 3.40 million household viewers with a 1.3 in the 18–49 demographics.

=== Critical reviews ===
"Amongst Friends" received positive reviews from critics. Ahsan Haque of IGN gave the episode a "great" 8.7 out of 10 and wrote, "Overall, this was another fantastic outing, and it's been a while since we've seen Vince so happy and worry-free. Too much success isn't a good thing though, and surely there will be some new challenges for Vince and friends to deal with in the coming season."

Josh Modell of The A.V. Club wrote, "[the episode] was actually pretty decent. Especially the relationship between Ari and Gary Cole's character, whose name I can't remember right this second."

Emily Christner of TV Guide wrote, "Ashley calls E. at the exact moment they find her missing bracelet in the couch and E. takes it over to her. They commend him for hopping back on the wagon." Jonathan Toomey of TV Squad wrote, "Overall, this ep felt a lot more put together than the premiere. I loved the addition of Jami Gertz (Mrs. Ari and Marlo together was funny stuff) and Turtle (er... Sal) and Jamie-Lynn's coming out."
