= Fore! (Entourage) =

- Entourage episode
- Episode no.: Season 6 Episode 5
- Directed by: Mark Mylod
- Written by: Doug Ellin
- Cinematography by: Rob Sweeney
- Editing by: Jeff Groth
- Original release date: August 9, 2009
- Running time: 23 minutes

Guest appearances
- Mark Wahlberg as Himself (special guest star); Jeffrey Tambor as Himself (special guest star); Jamie-Lynn Sigler as Herself (special guest star); George Segal as Murray Berenson (special guest star); Tom Brady as Himself (special guest star); Alexis Dziena as Ashley Brooks; Cassidy Lehrman as Sarah Gold

Episode chronology
| ← Previous "Runnin' on E" | Next → "Murphy's Lie" |

"Fore!" is the fifth episode of the sixth season of the American comedy-drama television series Entourage. It is the 71st overall episode of the series and was written by series creator Doug Ellin, and directed by co-executive producer Mark Mylod. It originally aired on HBO on August 9, 2009.

The series chronicles the acting career of Vincent Chase, a young A-list movie star, and his childhood friends from Queens, New York City, as they attempt to further their nascent careers in Los Angeles. In the episode, the boys attend a charity golf tournament with celebrities.

According to Nielsen Media Research, the episode gained a 1.7/5 ratings share among adults aged 18–49. The episode received generally positive reviews from critics, although some were unconvinced by the episode's humor and storylines.

== Plot ==
While dining with Ashley (Alexis Dziena), Eric (Kevin Connolly) is called by Sloan (Emmanuelle Chriqui), informing him that she is co-chairing a celebrity charity golf tournament that Eric and Vince (Adrian Grenier) will attend. Eric understands the decision, although he does not tell Ashley of Sloan's involvement.

At the tournament, Vince and Drama (Kevin Dillon) are paired with Mark Wahlberg and Tom Brady, while Sloan pairs Eric and Turtle (Jerry Ferrara) with manager Murray Berenson (George Segal). Bored with them, Turtle decides to join Vince and Drama. Turtle is a Giants fan and intends to annoy Brady with his comments. Meanwhile, Ari (Jeremy Piven) is paired with Jeffrey Tambor, who forced his uninterested children in accompanying him. Tambor hopes to impress them with his golf skills, although he constantly cheats as they are not paying attention.

Drama is angered at his poor skills, and destroys Brady's club when he continues failing. Before Turtle speaks negatively to Brady, he invites Turtle and Jamie-Lynn Sigler to dine with him and his wife at their mansion, prompting Turtle to forget his comments. Murray offers Eric the chance to work with him, revealing that he knew him through Sloan. Realizing this is why she paired him with him, Eric confronts her, although he considers the offer. As the tournament ends, Tambor is questioned over his numbers, as he might have broken a record but they need to verify it. At home, Eric discusses the events with Ashley. As she leaves for a moment, she is taken aback when Eric refers to her as Sloan.

== Production ==
=== Development ===
The episode was written by series creator Doug Ellin, and directed by co-executive producer Mark Mylod. This was Ellin's 46th writing credit, and Mylod's 20th directing credit.

=== Casting ===
Originally, the episode would feature guest appearances by Peyton Manning and Eli Manning. However, the Manning brothers had to cancel with four days to go before filming started. Executive producer Mark Wahlberg contacted Tom Brady, who agreed to replace the brothers in the episode.

== Reception ==
=== Viewers ===
In its original American broadcast, "Fore!" gained a 1.7/5 in the 18–49 demographics. This means that 1.7 percent of all households with televisions watched the episode, while 5 percent of all of those watching television at the time of the broadcast watched it. In comparison, the previous episode was seen by an estimated 3.30 million household viewers with a 1.9/6 in the 18–49 demographics.

=== Critical reviews ===
"Fore!" received generally positive reviews from critics. Ahsan Haque of IGN gave the episode a "good" 7.8 out of 10 and wrote, "While it's certainly entertaining, there isn't all that much substance or memorable humor in this episode. With Mark Wahlberg making a guest appearance, it would have been fun to see more exchanges between him and Vince just for the irony of it all. The bits with Eric getting drawn in once again by Sloan feel a little too familiar, and Ari's continuous lambasting of Lloyd has lost its appeal as well. This was definitely an entertaining filler episode, but the subject matter and character interactions felt a little stale this time around."

Emily St. James of The A.V. Club gave the episode a "B–" grade and wrote, "All in all, not bad. I'm not sitting on the edge of my seat waiting for the next new episode, but I'm glad the show has found a groove where it's at least a semi-pleasant way to close out your Sunday night."

Emily Christner of TV Guide wrote, "The absence of Vince's career drama is a welcome change for once and the guest stars provided some new and interesting material for the boys." Jonathan Toomey of TV Squad wrote, "Seems like the dynamic of Entourage is really shifting lately, huh? Over the past two or three episodes, Eric has moved to the head of the class, taking over the biggest parts of each half-hour. I'm not complaining, but earlier in the season I did wonder what the result of Vince's success would be. Now we know."

Jeffrey Tambor submitted this episode for consideration for Outstanding Guest Actor in a Comedy Series at the 62nd Primetime Emmy Awards.
