= Security Briefs =

- Entourage episode
- Episode no.: Season 6 Episode 9
- Directed by: Ken Whittingham
- Written by: Ally Musika
- Cinematography by: Anthony Hardwick
- Editing by: Gregg Featherman
- Original release date: September 13, 2009
- Running time: 25 minutes

Guest appearances
- Zac Efron as Himself (special guest star); Frank Darabont as Himself (special guest star); Peter Stormare as Aaron Cohen (special guest star); Alexis Dziena as Ashley Brooks; Jordan Belfi as Adam Davies; Jana Kramer as Brooke Manning; Inbar Lavi as Sadie; Kyle Quesnoy as Curtis Tucker; Dawn Olivieri as Costume Fitting Girl; Sterling Sulieman as Craig

Episode chronology
← Previous "The Sorkin Notes"	Next → "Berried Alive"

"Security Briefs" is the ninth episode of the sixth season of the American comedy-drama television series Entourage. It is the 75th overall episode of the series and was written by executive producer Ally Musika, and directed by Ken Whittingham. It originally aired on HBO on September 13, 2009.

The series chronicles the acting career of Vincent Chase, a young A-list movie star, and his childhood friends from Queens, New York City, as they attempt to further their nascent careers in Los Angeles. In the episode, Lloyd considers an offer from Ari's rival, while Drama tries to find Vince's stalker.

According to Nielsen Media Research, the episode was seen by an estimated 2.60 million household viewers and gained a 1.6/4 ratings share among adults aged 18–49. The episode received extremely positive reviews from critics, particularly for Lloyd's storyline.

== Plot ==
Vince (Adrian Grenier), Drama (Kevin Dillon) and Turtle (Jerry Ferrara) are annoyed by the Israeli security team. They leave the mansion to meet with Frank Darabont over the film, calling Eric (Kevin Connolly) to meet them up. However, Ashley (Alexis Dziena) is suspicious of Eric's phone calls.

Ari (Jeremy Piven) has Lloyd (Rex Lee) listen to a call between him and Adam Davies (Jordan Belfi). He then humiliates Adam by putting him into contact with his client, Zac Efron, who is angry about a joke that Adam made about a planned marketing strategy. Efron then states he is signing with Ari, infuriating Adam. Later, Adam calls Lloyd, offering him his desired position of agent if he joins him. Lloyd declines the offer, although he expresses frustration that Ari is not stopping with the hazing and even refuses to say if he is keeping his promise. While Lloyd drives Ari's car, he gets into a heated argument with Ari over the phone, which culminates with the car accidentally getting rear-ended. Fed up, Lloyd quits and leaves the car, infuriating Ari.

While on UCLA, Turtle is approached by sorority girls and decides to spend time with them. Drama, meanwhile, decides to track the stalker, finding that he frequents a store that he also usually visits. However, Turtle calls Drama and Vince to reveal that the sorority girls were responsible for the robbery, as they wanted to steal Jamie-Lynn Sigler's underwear. Ashley visits Eric at his office, where she expresses jealousy over his female assistant. The episode ends as Ari is introduced to his new assistant, Craig (Sterling Sulieman).

== Production ==
=== Development ===
The episode was written by executive producer Ally Musika, and directed by Ken Whittingham. This was Musika's 12th writing credit, and Whittingham's ninth directing credit.

== Reception ==
=== Viewers ===
In its original American broadcast, "Security Briefs" was seen by an estimated 2.60 million household viewers with a 1.6/4 in the 18–49 demographics. This means that 1.6 percent of all households with televisions watched the episode, while 4 percent of all of those watching television at the time of the broadcast watched it. In comparison, the previous episode was watched by an estimated 1.9/6 in the 18–49 demographics.

=== Critical reviews ===
"Security Briefs" received extremely positive reviews from critics. Ahsan Haque of IGN gave the episode a "great" 8.8 out of 10 and wrote, "Overall, this was another entertaining episode. It was nice to see Lloyd finally walk out on Ari. His new assistant has no idea what he's in for. The stalker storyline resolution felt a little dramatically unexciting, but did lead to a few interesting moments for Turtle."

Claire Zulkey of The A.V. Club gave the episode a "B" grade and wrote, "I've had a hard time taking much interest in the story lines this season (what exactly has Vince been doing all this time?) and this feels like the first episode where I'm actively looking forward to seeing what happens next week. Sadly, I have a feeling this is the only big story the season, but I'll take what I can get."

Emily Christner of TV Guide wrote, "The boys decide to celebrate with a night on the town and Ari gets a new assistant, who he immediately starts to torture. Some things never change." Jonathan Toomey of TV Squad wrote, "I'm less excited about seeing Lloyd at the new gig (you know he'll do well), and more excited to see Ari attempt to function without him. Ari has said it a million times - Lloyd is the best assistant he's ever had and Andrew warned Ari about that too. If he didn't make it happen for him, someone else would."
