= One Car, Two Car, Red Car, Blue Car =

- Entourage episode
- Episode no.: Season 6 Episode 3
- Directed by: Mark Mylod
- Written by: Doug Ellin
- Cinematography by: Rob Sweeney
- Editing by: Gregg Featherman
- Original release date: July 26, 2009
- Running time: 26 minutes

Guest appearances
- Jamie-Lynn Sigler as Herself (special guest star); 50 Cent as Himself (special guest star); Alexis Dziena as Ashley Brooks; Bow Wow as Charlie Williams; Louis Lombardi as Ronnie; Camille Saviola as Turtle's Mom; Janet Varney as Amy Miller

Episode chronology
← Previous "Amongst Friends"	Next → "Runnin' on E"

"One Car, Two Car, Red Car, Blue Car" is the third episode of the sixth season of the American comedy-drama television series Entourage. It is the 69th overall episode of the series and was written by series creator Doug Ellin, and directed by co-executive producer Mark Mylod. It originally aired on HBO on July 26, 2009.

The series chronicles the acting career of Vincent Chase, a young A-list movie star, and his childhood friends from Queens, New York City, as they attempt to further their nascent careers in Los Angeles. In the episode, Eric realizes that the network will remove Charlie from the series after receiving test screening results, while Turtle decides to prove himself on his 30th birthday.

According to Nielsen Media Research, the episode gained a 1.6/5 ratings share among adults aged 18–49. The episode received positive reviews from critics, who praised Eric's storyline in the episode.

== Plot ==
Eric (Kevin Connolly) continues his relationship with Ashley (Alexis Dziena) as he awaits the results from Charlie (Bow Wow) and his pilot. He meets with Amy (Janet Varney), but he is upset over the results; while the pilot was well received, Charlie was one of the weakest aspects and the executives have decided to remove him from the series.

On his 30th birthday, Turtle (Jerry Ferrara) is called by his mother (Camille Saviola) over the media's coverage of his relationship with Jamie-Lynn Sigler, telling him that he looks poorly compared to her celebrity status. To cheer him up, Vince (Adrian Grenier) gives him a Ferrari as a gift. However, the situation grows awkward when Sigler shows up with another car for Turtle, unaware that Vince already gave him another. Feeling that he needs to prove himself, Turtle visits Ari (Jeremy Piven) to ask him for help in starting a new management business. But Ari tells Turtle that he is not ready to handle the business, feeling he lacks the hard work needed to make it happen.

Eric returns home, finding that Ashley is still in the house. They decide to watch Charlie's pilot together. But while Eric finds Charlie hilarious, Ashley is not thrilled with him. Eric concludes that he needs to step up for Charlie, even if he realizes he does not fit in the series. Inspired by Ari, Eric makes his way to Amy's office, demanding to let Charlie stay. When she rebuffs it, Eric accuses her of racism, upsetting her. He later joins the boys at a bar to celebrate Turtle's birthday, where Turtle announces that he is going to the University of California, Los Angeles to learn about management.

== Production ==
=== Development ===
The episode was written by series creator Doug Ellin, and directed by co-executive producer Mark Mylod. This was Ellin's 44th writing credit, and Mylod's 19th directing credit.

== Reception ==
=== Viewers ===
In its original American broadcast, "One Car, Two Car, Red Car, Blue Car" was seen by an estimated 1.6/5 in the 18–49 demographics. This means that 1.6 percent of all households with televisions watched the episode, while 5 percent of all of those watching television at the time of the broadcast watched it. In comparison, the previous episode was watched by an estimated 3.40 million household viewers with a 1.3 in the 18–49 demographics.

=== Critical reviews ===
"One Car, Two Car, Red Car, Blue Car" received positive reviews from critics. Ahsan Haque of IGN gave the episode an "amazing" 9.2 out of 10 and wrote, "Overall, this was another really fun episode of the guys living the life, but we also get to see a bit of the boys doing some growing up, which should hopefully be a trend that continues this season. So far, it seems that we're going to be in a heavier focus on Ari and Vince's buddies, and less on Vince's own career."

Josh Modell of The A.V. Club gave the episode a "C+" grade and wrote, "A pretty lightweight episode, but fun enough. I realize that's damnation with faint praise, but this week and last week's episodes are probably as good as Entourage is ever going to get from here on out. If that sounds horrible, maybe it's time to jump off the train." Emily Christner of TV Guide wrote, "all is forgotten when they order three bottles of the most expensive wine on the menu and kick back to celebrate life, success and Turtle's 30th. Here's to Turtle."
