= The Sorkin Notes =

- Entourage episode
- Episode no.: Season 6 Episode 8
- Directed by: Mark Mylod
- Written by: Doug Ellin; Ally Musika
- Cinematography by: Rob Sweeney
- Editing by: Steven Sprung
- Original release date: August 30, 2009
- Running time: 25 minutes

Guest appearances
- Beverly D'Angelo as Barbara Miller (special guest star); Aaron Sorkin as Himself (special guest star); Peter Stormare as Aaron Cohen (special guest star); Alexis Dziena as Ashley Brooks; Jami Gertz as Marlo Klein; Autumn Reeser as Lizzie Grant; Kate Mara as Brittany

Episode chronology
| ← Previous "No More Drama" | Next → "Security Briefs" |

"The Sorkin Notes" is the eighth episode of the sixth season of the American comedy-drama television series Entourage. It is the 74th overall episode of the series and was written by series creator Doug Ellin and executive producer Ally Musika, and directed by co-executive producer Mark Mylod. It originally aired on HBO on August 30, 2009.

The series chronicles the acting career of Vincent Chase, a young A-list movie star, and his childhood friends from Queens, New York City, as they attempt to further their nascent careers in Los Angeles. In the episode, Eric finally takes a decision over his dilemma with Sloan and Ashley. Meanwhile, Vince gets a new security system, while Ari tries to sign Aaron Sorkin just as Andrew hits his breaking point.

According to Nielsen Media Research, the episode gained a 1.9/6 ratings share among adults aged 18–49. The episode received positive reviews from critics, with praise for Sorkin's and Stormare's guest appearances and character development.

== Plot ==
Vince (Adrian Grenier) is suspicious that the stalker is still following him. He decides to hire a security team, led by Aaron Cohen (Peter Stormare). Aaron is very strict over the security protocols, but also reaffirms the costs are expensive, prompting Vince to question if he really needs the system.

Homeless and without money, Andrew (Gary Cole) sleeps in the couches of Miller Gold, angering Ari (Jeremy Piven). Barbara (Beverly D'Angelo) is also mad at Andrew's actions, and threatens to fire him if he can't sign Aaron Sorkin as promised. Minutes before his meeting, Andrew leaves for his home to get notes he prepared for Sorkin, but Marlo (Jami Gertz) refuses to let him inside. When Ari angrily demands he come back, Marlo burns Sorkin's notes. Reaching his breaking point, Andrew turns back in his car and crashes into the house. As Sorkin dislikes nearly everyone at the office, Ari is forced to bring him along to visit Andrew in prison. Andrew laments his situation, but Sorkin surprises them by signing with them.

Eric (Kevin Connolly) and Sloan (Emmanuelle Chriqui) put aside their previous conflicts, wanting to remain friends. Even though she is dating someone, she invites him for drinks, which he accepts. As he awaits, Eric is called by Ashley (Alexis Dziena), who apologizes for her behavior and asks to meet him. When Sloan arrives, Eric tells her he is leaving to be with Ashley, feeling exhausted that Sloan is not progressing in their status. He meets with Ashley, and they proceed to have sex. Back at his house, Vince is informed by Aaron that the stalker's driver's licence has been discovered.

== Production ==
=== Development ===
The episode was written by series creator Doug Ellin and executive producer Ally Musika, and directed by co-executive producer Mark Mylod. This was Ellin's 48th writing credit, Musika's 11th writing credit, and Mylod's 21st directing credit.

== Reception ==
=== Viewers ===
In its original American broadcast, "The Sorkin Notes" was seen by an estimated 1.9/6 in the 18–49 demographics. This means that 1.9 percent of all households with televisions watched the episode, while 6 percent of all of those watching television at the time of the broadcast watched it. In comparison, the previous episode was watched by an estimated 3.18 million household viewers with a 1.9/5 in the 18–49 demographics.

=== Critical reviews ===
"The Sorkin Notes" received positive reviews from critics. Ahsan Haque of IGN gave the episode an "amazing" 9 out of 10 and wrote, "Overall, it's another one of those well-crafted Entourage episodes that's very hard to find much fault with. Pillared by an outstanding performance by Gary Cole, the stalker storyline and Eric's yo-yo'ing love triangle manage to thoroughly entertain from start to finish."

Josh Modell of The A.V. Club gave the episode a "B–" grade and wrote, "What I really wanted out of this plot was a) Stormare being awesome and b) a peek into what type of security system big movie stars might actually use. I got neither. But hopefully Stormare can step it up next week. Overall, though, a decent episode."

Emily Christner of TV Guide wrote, "Alan Cohen, the security guy recommended to Vince by Ari, comes by with an entourage of his own and outfits the house with cameras, bulletproof glass and more. The role-playing in different security breach scenarios that ensues is probably the only highlight of this episode." Jonathan Toomey of TV Squad wrote, "There are so many solid plots going on this season and every time I think that something big is gonna happen, it falls flat and leaves me disappointed."

Aaron Sorkin's guest appearance received praise from critics and was deemed as one of the best guests in the series. In 2020, The Ringer ranked Sorkin's appearance as the best of his cameos in his career, writing, "I decided not to rewatch this brief Season 6 arc of Entourage and instead let my 20-year-old self cast the judgment. And guess what: 20-year-old me remembers this being pretty dope. Sorkin was all business and I'm pretty sure the story line peaked with Gary Cole driving his car through a house and Sorkin and Arie visiting him in jail. The aughts were friggin’ sick, bro, we're gonna live forever."

Jami Gertz submitted this episode for consideration for Outstanding Guest Actress in a Comedy Series, while Doug Ellin and Ally Musika submitted it for Outstanding Writing for a Comedy Series at the 62nd Primetime Emmy Awards.
