= Drive (Entourage) =

- Entourage episode
- Episode no.: Season 6 Episode 1
- Directed by: Mark Mylod
- Written by: Doug Ellin
- Cinematography by: Rob Sweeney
- Editing by: Gregg Featherman
- Original release date: July 12, 2009
- Running time: 28 minutes

Guest appearances
- Beverly D'Angelo as Barbara Miller (special guest star); Jamie-Lynn Sigler as Herself (special guest star); Jay Leno as Himself (special guest star); Debi Mazar as Shauna Roberts (special guest star); Amelia Jackson-Gray as Amy; Nikki Griffin as E's Date; Cassidy Lehrman as Sarah Gold; Jimmy Shubert as Assistant Director; David Bowe as Scott

Episode chronology
← Previous "Return to Queens Blvd."	Next → "Amongst Friends"

"Drive" is the first episode of the sixth season of the American comedy-drama television series Entourage. It is the 67th overall episode of the series and was written by series creator Doug Ellin, and directed by co-executive producer Mark Mylod. It originally aired on HBO on July 12, 2009.

The series chronicles the acting career of Vincent Chase, a young A-list movie star, and his childhood friends from Queens, New York City, as they attempt to further their nascent careers in Los Angeles. In the episode, the boys are back in Los Angeles. Vince prepares for a driving test for his new film, while Eric considers moving out of the mansion.

According to Nielsen Media Research, the episode was seen by an estimated 3.40 million household viewers and gained a 1.9/6 ratings share among adults aged 18–49. The episode received mixed reviews from critics, although some praised the episode as a more interesting set-up than the previous season.

== Plot ==
The boys have returned to Los Angeles, preparing for the Gatsby premiere. Vince (Adrian Grenier) is also preparing to play Enzo Ferrari in a biopic, and he starts learning how to drive a car to get his licence. Eric (Kevin Connolly) has dated many women, but is suddenly contacted by Sloan (Emmanuelle Chriqui) to ask for his help in watching over a friend's house.

With Andrew (Gary Cole) as part of their team, Ari (Jeremy Piven) has managed to sign many TV head writers for Miller Gold. However, Lloyd (Rex Lee) has expressed dissatisfaction lately. He suddenly surprises Ari and Andrew by demanding a promotion, which is mocked by both of them. When Lloyd harasses Melissa (Perrey Reeves) at home to tell him Ari caused him to "leave", Ari decides to make Lloyd meet him outside his mansion at 10pm, although he willingly goes outside until 1:30am. He tells Lloyd that if he does everything he says for 100 days, he will be promoted, and Lloyd accepts to his terms.

Vince passes his driving test, although he bribes the instructor with VIP tickets to the Gatsby premiere to ensure it. He shares the story during The Tonight Show with Jay Leno. While accompanying Eric on a double date with Sloan, Vince has sex with Sloan's friend in his car. While still unconvinced over leaving Vince's house, Eric decides to accept Sloan's suggestion in getting a new house. With Eric moving out and Turtle (Jerry Ferrara) and Drama (Kevin Dillon) going out, Vince ponders over the future of the house as he arrives alone.

== Production ==
=== Development ===
The episode was written by series creator Doug Ellin, and directed by co-executive producer Mark Mylod. This was Ellin's 43rd writing credit, and Mylod's 17th directing credit.

== Reception ==
=== Viewers ===
In its original American broadcast, "Drive" was seen by an estimated 3.40 million household viewers with a 1.9/6 in the 18–49 demographics. This means that 1.9 percent of all households with televisions watched the episode, while 6 percent of all of those watching television at the time of the broadcast watched it. This was a 65% increase in viewership with the previous episode, which was watched by an estimated 2.05 million household viewers with a 1.3 in the 18–49 demographics.

=== Critical reviews ===
"Drive" received mixed reviews from critics. Ahsan Haque of IGN gave the episode a "great" 8.9 out of 10 and wrote, "Overall, this is a fast-paced episode packed with plenty of laughs and some great visuals, and a refreshingly lighter storyline compared to last season's challenging character building outings. It all ends way too quickly, and despite the heavy focus on the friends, Ari once again steals the show with his bombastic and over the top performance."

Josh Modell of The A.V. Club gave the episode a "C–" grade and wrote, "Hopefully this boring-ish episode was just setting up some more interesting action to come this season, because if we're about to delve into the deep dark soul of Vincent Chase, consider me officially signed off. Entourage is still occasionally funny, but it's almost completely adrift at this point, grabbing at plots that nobody seems to care about and generally just spinning wheels."

Emily Christner of TV Guide wrote, "It's good to see the boys back living the good life because their misfortunes of the past season were starting to wear a little thin." Jonathan Toomey of TV Squad wrote, "Entourage was due for an overhaul if you think about it, and what could be more perfect than seeing what life is like for the guys when they aren't constantly worrying about Vince's career?"
