= Murphy's Lie =

- Entourage episode
- Episode no.: Season 6 Episode 6
- Directed by: Julian Farino
- Written by: Ally Musika
- Cinematography by: Anthony Hardwick
- Editing by: Jeff Groth
- Original release date: August 16, 2009
- Running time: 29 minutes

Guest appearances
- Beverly D'Angelo as Barbara Miller (special guest star); Jamie-Lynn Sigler as Herself (special guest star); Timothy Busfield as Himself (special guest star); Steve Nash as Himself (special guest star); George Segal as Murray Berenson (special guest star); Alexis Dziena as Ashley Brooks; Autumn Reeser as Lizzie Grant; Jami Gertz as Marlo Klein; Matt Letscher as Dan Coakley; Branden Williams as Himself; Cole Williams as Himself; Jimmy Shubert as Jimmy; Tiffany Brouwer as Campus Girl

Episode chronology
← Previous "Fore!"	Next → "No More Drama"

"Murphy's Lie" is the sixth episode of the sixth season of the American comedy-drama television series Entourage. It is the 72nd overall episode of the series and was written by executive producer Ally Musika, and directed by Julian Farino. It originally aired on HBO on August 16, 2009.

The series chronicles the acting career of Vincent Chase, a young A-list movie star, and his childhood friends from Queens, New York City, as they attempt to further their nascent careers in Los Angeles. In the episode, Eric tries to salvage his relationship with Ashley, while Drama believes his boss is trying to have sex with Jamie-Lynn Sigler during her guest appearance. Meanwhile, Ari continues facing problems with Andrew's affair.

According to Nielsen Media Research, the episode was seen by an estimated 2.80 million household viewers and gained a 1.7/5 ratings share among adults aged 18–49. The episode received extremely positive reviews from critics, who noted the episode as an improvement over the previous episodes.

== Plot ==
Drama (Kevin Dillon) and Jamie-Lynn Sigler film their kiss scene for Five Towns. Director Timothy Busfield is satisfied, although he wants more scenes with Sigler, alarming Turtle (Jerry Ferrara). Eric (Kevin Connolly) apologizes to Ashley (Alexis Dziena) for calling her Sloan, claiming he didn't see her recently. Ashley accepts it and have sex. However, while Eric showers, Ashley checks his phone and realizes that he saw Sloan for the job offer and angrily leaves.

After sleeping on the couch for days, Ari (Jeremy Piven) finally talks with Melissa (Perrey Reeves) to apologize in indirectly motivating Andrew (Gary Cole) in leaving his family. Melissa finally forgives him, allowing him to resume his life. However, Marlo (Jami Gertz) storms into Miller Gold, angrily demanding the name of the woman who slept with Andrew. Ari fails to calm her down, but gets her to leave. He then angrily gets Lloyd (Rex Lee) to find Andrew and Lizzie (Autumn Reeser) and bring them over. He insults them for their affair, and decides to fire both of them. Lizzie convinces him in letting them stay by proclaiming she got clients signed and forcing Andrew to confirm the affair is over. As Andrew laments ruining his life, Ari tells him to reconcile with Marlo.

Vince (Adrian Grenier) accompanies Turtle to UCLA and decides to spend the day with a college girl. Drama's boss, studio executive Dan Coakley (Matt Letscher) arrives on set and decides to invite Sigler to lunch with him. Fearing he will sleep with her, Drama abandons filming and embarrasses Coakley in front of a meeting. Coakley denies sleeping with Sigler, and threatens to fire Drama for his actions. Eric meets with Murray (George Segal) and agrees to work at his company. He then meets with Ashley, who angrily confronts him for lying about his encounter with Sloan. As Eric apologizes, she asks him to confirm he moved on from her. Eric admits he still has feelings for Sloan, prompting Ashley to close the door on him.

== Production ==
=== Development ===
The episode was written by executive producer Ally Musika, and directed by Julian Farino. This was Musika's tenth writing credit, and Farino's 23rd directing credit.

== Reception ==
=== Viewers ===
In its original American broadcast, "Murphy's Lie" was seen by an estimated 2.80 million household viewers with a 1.7/5 in the 18–49 demographics. This means that 1.7 percent of all households with televisions watched the episode, while 5 percent of all of those watching television at the time of the broadcast watched it. In comparison, the previous episode gained a 1.7/5 in the 18–49 demographics.

=== Critical reviews ===
"Murphy's Lie" received extremely positive reviews from critics. Ahsan Haque of IGN gave the episode an "amazing" 9.1 out of 10 and wrote, "Overall this was another great episode and the first one in a long time that had me at the edge of my seat wondering what was going to happen next. The writers did an excellent job building up Drama's storyline and that confrontation at the end with his boss was definitely one of the best Johnny Drama scenes we've seen in a long time. Welcome back Drama!"

Josh Modell of The A.V. Club gave the episode a "B" grade and wrote, "Maybe I'm just feeling charitable because I spent most of the day at the beach instead of in front of a glowing box, but Entourage has been on a little bit of a roll for the past few weeks. I think we can all admit — even those of you that are defending every bum joke every week — that the first couple of episodes this season were total bummers, but they seem to have hit a groove in the last couple of weeks."

TV Guide wrote, "Eric mulls a job offer and tries to rebound from an ill-advised remark to Ashley. Plus, Drama puts himself between Jamie-Lynn and a notorious TV boss, and Ari is surprised by an agency visit from Andrew's wife." Jonathan Toomey of TV Squad wrote, "I have hope that it can still tie together, but it's looking grim right now. Drama is gung-ho for Five Towns in a big way (more than we've ever seen before), Eric is working for Murray now, and Turtle is going to be sitting in lecture halls four days a week. Granted, the addition of Jamie-Lynn Sigler to the guest cast for Five Towns has kept a connection between Drama and Turtle alive (I will feel horrible for Turtle if that network exec Coakley does end up screwing Jamie-Lynn), but Eric is so far removed from everything else right now, that his scenes feel like we're watching a show within a show."

Gary Cole submitted this episode for consideration for Outstanding Guest Actor in a Comedy Series at the 62nd Primetime Emmy Awards.
