= No More Drama (Entourage) =

- Entourage episode
- Episode no.: Season 6 Episode 7
- Directed by: Doug Ellin
- Written by: Doug Ellin
- Cinematography by: Anthony Hardwick
- Editing by: Steven Sprung
- Original release date: August 23, 2009
- Running time: 26 minutes

Guest appearances
- Jamie-Lynn Sigler as Herself (special guest star); Bob Saget as Himself (special guest star); George Segal as Murray Berenson (special guest star); Scott Caan as Scott Lavin; Matt Letscher as Dan Coakley; Kate Mara as Brittany; Fatso-Fasano as Lawrence Hall; Niki Huey as Vince's Sleepover

Episode chronology
← Previous "Murphy's Lie"	Next → "The Sorkin Notes"

"No More Drama" is the seventh episode of the sixth season of the American comedy-drama television series Entourage. It is the 73rd overall episode of the series and was written and directed by series creator Doug Ellin. It originally aired on HBO on August 23, 2009.

The series chronicles the acting career of Vincent Chase, a young A-list movie star, and his childhood friends from Queens, New York City, as they attempt to further their nascent careers in Los Angeles. In the episode, Drama tries to save his job, while Eric competes with a colleague to sign Bob Saget as a client.

According to Nielsen Media Research, the episode was seen by an estimated 3.18 million household viewers and gained a 1.9/5 ratings share among adults aged 18–49. The episode received generally positive reviews from critics, although some criticized the disjointed storylines and pacing.

== Plot ==
Vince (Adrian Grenier) is awakened in the middle of the night when someone breaks into his house, although he is unable to see the intruder. The following morning, the police inspect the house, but conclude that the intruder didn't take any valuable items from the house. However, Vince and Turtle (Jerry Ferrara) realize that Vince's underwear was actually stolen.

Drama (Kevin Dillon) is upset upon learning that Coakley (Matt Letscher) has cancelled his shooting scenes for the day, alarming him that he will be fired. He is also banned from showing up at the studio, and Coakley refuses to speak with him. Eric (Kevin Connolly) begins working with Murray (George Segal) at his agency, competing with his colleague Scott Lavin (Scott Caan) in signing talent. Murray wants them to get Bob Saget, and Eric decides to use his connection to Saget in getting close to him. However, Saget claims he is only interested in being part of the agency if he is allowed to have sex in Murray's office. Eric talks with Murray, but is confused when Murray agrees to let Saget do it.

After speaking with his friends and Jamie-Lynn Sigler, Drama decides to sneak into Coakley's office to apologize and explain his personality. Despite Drama having recorded their conversation, Coakley tells him he won't fire him, but suggests he will torture him. He returns to Vince's house, bringing a gun as security. When the gun accidentally goes off, Vince decides to get a new security system, despite having to wait days for installation.

== Production ==
=== Development ===
The episode was written and directed by series creator Doug Ellin. This was Ellin's 47th writing credit and first directing credit.

== Reception ==
=== Viewers ===
In its original American broadcast, "No More Drama" was seen by an estimated 3.18 million household viewers with a 1.9/5 in the 18–49 demographics. This means that 1.9 percent of all households with televisions watched the episode, while 5 percent of all of those watching television at the time of the broadcast watched it. This was a 13% increase in viewership with the previous episode, which was watched by an estimated 2.80 million household viewers with a 1.7/5 in the 18–49 demographics.

=== Critical reviews ===
"No More Drama" received generally positive reviews from critics. Ahsan Haque of IGN gave the episode an "amazing" 9.3 out of 10 and wrote, "More so than other episodes this season, there seemed to be a lot of genuine character development moments. Vince's reaction to his home being broken into, Eric's handling of his new nemesis at the office, and Drama's predictable apology were all great character moments. Add to this a completely over-the-top performance by Bob Saget and you have the makings of a very strong episode. It's pretty clear that Vince and his career is taking a back seat to his buddies this season, and it's a welcome change of pace. We've seen a lot of Vince over the years, so stepping back and letting Drama, Turtle and Eric take the spotlight has been quite entertaining so far."

Claire Zulkey of The A.V. Club gave the episode a "C" grade and wrote, "I thought it was a ho-hum episode overall, but again, I was asked to think about it so the regular TV viewer in me would have declared it "fine" but as an AV Clubber I have to give it a "meh.""

Emily Christner of TV Guide wrote, "Predictably, his apology turns into another threat when Coakley pushes the wrong buttons, making the situation worse. You didn't think Drama would get himself out of this one without a little more "drama," did you?" Jonathan Toomey of TV Squad wrote, "Eric taking Murray's job offer may be the best thing that's ever happened on Entourage. It's opened up this whole new dynamic on the show and honestly makes things a lot more interesting. Granted, it does push Vince even further into the background of the show, but that's been a steady trend for a while now. I'll put up with anything to get Bob Saget back."

Scott Caan, Bob Saget and George Segal submitted this episode for consideration for Outstanding Guest Actor in a Comedy Series at the 62nd Primetime Emmy Awards.
