= Jay Leno filmography =

Jay Leno is an American comedian, actor, voice actor, writer, producer and television host.

== Film ==
Year	Film	Role	Notes
1977	Fun with Dick and Jane	Carpenter	Uncredited
1978	Silver Bears	Albert Fiore	
1978	American Hot Wax	Mookie	
1979	Americathon	Larry Miller	
1981	Polyester	Journalist on TV News	Uncredited
1983	What's Up, Hideous Sun Demon	Ishmael Pivnik	Voice
1989	Collision Course	Detective Tony Costas	Filmed in 1989, released in 1992
1993	Loaded Weapon 1	Everett	
1993	Dave	Himself	
1993	We're Back! A Dinosaur's Story	Vorb	Voice
1993	Wayne's World 2	Himself	
1994	The Flintstones	Bedrock's Most Wanted Host	
1994	Major League II	Himself	
1996	The Birdcage	Himself	Uncredited
1997	Meet Wally Sparks	Himself	
1997	Contact	Himself	
1997	In & Out	Himself	
1997	Mad City	Himself	
1997	Wag the Dog	Himself	
1997	Just Write	Himself	Uncredited
1998	The Emperor's New Clothes: An All-Star Illustrated Retelling of the Classic Fairy Tale	The Moth	Voice
1999	EDtv	Himself	
2000	Space Cowboys	Himself	
2002	John Q	Himself	
2002	Juwanna Mann	Himself	
2003	Stuck on You	Himself	
2003	Calendar Girls	Himself	
2004	Mr. 3000	Himself	
2004	First Daughter	Himself	
2005	Robots	Fire Hydrant	Voice; cameo
2006	Tales of the Rat Fink	Himself	Voice
2006	Ice Age: The Meltdown	Fast Tony	Voice
2006	Cars	Jay Limo	Voice; cameo
2006	The Astronaut Farmer	Himself	
2007	Christmas Is Here Again	Narrator	Voice
2007	Underdog	Himself	
2008	Scooby-Doo! and the Goblin King	Jack O'Lantern	Voice
2008	The Great Buck Howard	Himself	
2008	Igor	King Malbert	Voice
2008	Unstable Fables: Tortoise vs. Hare	Murray Hare	Voice
2010	I'm Still Here	Himself	
2013	Delivery Man	Himself	
2015	Ted 2	Himself	
2017	Gilbert	Himself	Documentary
2024	Midas Man	Ed Sullivan	

== Television ==
Year	Series	Role	Notes
1976	Good Times	The Young Man	Episode: "J.J. in Trouble"
1976	Holmes & Yoyo	Gas Station Attendant	Episode: "Pilot"
1978	Almost Heaven	Danny	TV movie
1979	One Day at a Time	Bernard Shapiro	Episode: "Going Nowhere" (1979)
1979–1983	Laverne & Shirley	Bobby Bitts, Joey Mitchell	Episodes: "Feminine Mistake" (1979) and "Do the Carmine" (1983) on
1981	Alice	Bones	Episode: "The Wild One"
1982	Madame's Place	Himself	Episode: "In Love, Engaged, Crazy"
1986	Jay Leno and the American Dream	Himself	Stand-up special
1986	Saturday Night Live	Himself (host)	Episode: "Jay Leno/The Neville Brothers"
1986	The Jay Leno Show	Himself	Stand-up special
1988	Sesame Street	Himself	Episode: "20.15"
1990	42nd Primetime Emmy Awards	Himself (co-host)	TV special
1992–2009, 2010–2014	The Tonight Show with Jay Leno	Himself (host)	4,610 episodes; also writer, executive producer
1993	The Larry Sanders Show	Himself	Episode: "Performance Artist"
1993	Frasier	Don	Voice; episode: "Oops"
1994	The Sinbad Show	Himself	2 episodes
1994–1995	The Fresh Prince of Bel-Air	Himself	2 episodes
1995, 1999	Home Improvement	Himself	2 episodes
1995	Mad About You	Himself	Episode: "Just My Dog"
1995	Happily Ever After: Fairy Tales for Every Child	Jay Frog	Voice; episode: "The Frog Prince"
1995	JAG	Himself	2 episodes
1995	Friends	Himself	Episode: "The One with Mrs. Bing"
1996	Seinfeld	Himself	Episode: "The Shower Head"
1996	Homicide: Life on the Street	Himself	Episode: "Sniper: Part 1"
1996	Wings	Himself	Episode: "The Team Player"
1996	Ellen	Himself	Episode: "Go Girlz"
1996	The Nanny	Himself	Episode: "The Taxman Cometh"
1996	3rd Rock from the Sun	Himself	Episode: "Dick Jokes"
1997	Caroline in the City	Himself	Episode: "Caroline and the Bad Trip"
1997	Muppets Tonight	Himself	Episode: "The Cameo Show"
1997	Baywatch	Himself	Episode: "Talk Show"
1997	Veronica's Closet	Himself	Episode: "Pilot"
1997–2002	Just Shoot Me!	Himself	2 episodes
1998, 2016	The Simpsons	Himself	Voice; 2 episodes
1998, 1999	V.I.P.	Himself	2 episodes
1998	South Park	Mr. Kitty	Voice; episode: "Cartman's Mom Is a Dirty Slut"
1999	Providence	Lucky the Dog	Voice; episode: "Blind Faith"
2000	Dilbert	Himself	Voice; episode: "The Delivery"
2000	The Drew Carey Show	Lewis' Boss	Episode: "Drew Live II"
2000	DAG	Himself	Episode: Pilot"
2000	The West Wing	Himself	Episode: "20 Hours in L.A."
2000	BattleBots	Himself	Episode: "Chinkilla vs. Ginsu"; (Exhibition match)
2001	Titus	Himself	Episode: "The Pit"
2001–2008, 2011	The Fairly OddParents	Crimson Chin, Nega-Chin	Voice; 12 episodes
2002	The Osbournes	Himself	Episode: "The Osbournes"
2002–2004	Teamo Supremo	Car-Go	Voice; Episode: "Getaway Car-Go!"
2003	Scrubs	Himself	Episode: "My Own Private Practice Guy"
2003	The Bernie Mac Show	Himself	Episode: "Pink Gold"
2005	Joey	Himself	Episode: "Joey and the Tonight Show"
2006	Jimmy Timmy Power Hour	Nega-Chin	Voice; crossover TV special
2006, 2009, 2016	Family Guy	Himself	Voice; 3 episodes
2008–2009	Top Gear	Himself	2 episodes (S12E07 Honda Clarity segment, S13E06 Star in a Reasonably Priced Car)
2009–2010	The Jay Leno Show	Himself (host)	95 episodes; also creator, writer, and executive producer
2009	Entourage	Himself	Episode: "Drive"
2010	White House Correspondents' Dinner	Himself (host)	TV special
2010	Hannah Montana	Himself	Episode: "I'll Always Remember You"
2011	Timmy's Secret Wish	Crimson Chin	TV special
2012	Louie	Himself	2 episodes
2013	Real Husbands of Hollywood	Himself	Episode: "Auf Wiedersehen, Mitches"
2014	Episodes	Himself	Episode: "Episode Four"
2014	Phineas and Ferb	Colonel Contraction	Voice; episode: "Phineas and Ferb Save Summer"
2014	Elf: Buddy's Musical Christmas	Fake Santa #1	Voice, television film
2014	Comedians in Cars Getting Coffee	Himself	Episode: "Comedy Is a Concealed Weapon"
2014–2016	The 7D	Crystal Ball	Voice; recurring role
2015	The Muppets	Himself	Episode: "Hostile Makeover"
2015–2021	Last Man Standing	Joe Leonard	Recurring role
2015–2022	Jay Leno's Garage	Himself (host)	Also creator, writer, and executive producer
2016	James May's Cars of the People	Himself	Episode 6 - "Steam Power"
2016	Ask the StoryBots	King Yardstick the Ruler	Voice; episode: "How Does Night Happen?"
2017	Lip Sync Battle	Himself	Episode: "Jay Leno vs. Craig Ferguson"
2017–2021	Mickey Mouse Mixed-Up Adventures	Billy Beagle	Voice; recurring role
2018	The Kominsky Method	Himself	Episode: "Chapter 2: An Agent Grieves"
2019	The Price Is Right	Himself	8632K, Dream Car Week
2019	T.O.T.S.	Hank Featherbee	Voice; episode: "Grandpa's Great Adventure"
2020	The Comedy Store	Himself	
2021–2023	You Bet Your Life	Himself (host)	Also executive producer
2023	Hot Wheels: Ultimate Challenge	Himself	Episodes: "Grand Finale, Part 1 & 2"
2024	Georgie & Mandy's First Marriage	Himself (voice only)	Episode: "Secrets, Lies, and a Chunk of Change"
2025	Shifting Gears	Himself	Episode: "Gummies"
