= Kissing a Fool =

- Promotional film poster
- Directed by: Doug Ellin
- Screenplay by: James Frey; Doug Ellin
- Story by: James Frey
- Produced by: Stephen Tag Mendillo; Andrew Form; Rick Lashbrook
- Starring: David Schwimmer; Jason Lee; Mili Avital; Vanessa Angel; Kari Wührer; Bonnie Hunt
- Cinematography: Thomas Del Ruth
- Edited by: David Finfer
- Music by: Joseph Vitarelli
- Production companies: Largo Entertainment; Rick Lashbrook Films
- Distributed by: Universal Pictures
- Release date: February 27, 1998
- Running time: 93 minutes
- Country: United States
- Language: English
- Budget: $19 million
- Box office: $4,106,588

Kissing a Fool is a 1998 American romantic comedy film directed by Doug Ellin. It stars David Schwimmer, Jason Lee, Mili Avital, Kari Wührer, and Vanessa Angel.

== Plot ==
Max, an alpha-male, commitment-phobic sports broadcaster, and Jay, a neurotic novelist, have been best friends since childhood in Chicago. Jay has just broken up with his girlfriend, Natasha, and is writing his first book about their relationship in Milan, Italy. He is melancholic and has been drinking.

Jay sets Max up with his editor, Samantha. After their first date, they each tell Jay in detail how terrible it was. Max claims Samantha was a loud, obnoxious drunk, while Samantha insists Max took her to a strip club. They then make out, burst out laughing, and admit they fooled him.

Although they share few interests, they become engaged within two weeks, and shortly thereafter Max moves in with Samantha. While flipping through bridal magazines, Max is upset by a photo of Jay’s model ex, Natasha, and later drunk-calls her.

When Max is confronted by a dream in which Sam is the last woman he will ever sleep with, he proposes a test: Jay will hit on Sam, and if she shows no interest, Max will feel confident enough in her loyalty to go through with the marriage.

Jay does not want to do it. Nervous and conflicted, he initially suggests limiting his meetings with Sam, but soon finds himself seeing her several times a week. When the publisher moves up the book’s completion date to six weeks, Jay and Sam are forced to spend even more time together.

Two weeks before the three plan to have a celebratory dinner for the book’s completion, Max has to travel to Detroit for work. Jay and Sam go out drinking and dancing, where Jay runs into Natasha. Sam pretends to be his new fiancée, and Natasha appears disheartened by the news.

Later, Jay crashes at Sam’s apartment. After finishing the manuscript, she goes upstairs to talk to him. They share a near-kiss before her cousin, Dre, interrupts them. Jay leaves and goes to Natasha’s hotel room at her invitation.

At the hotel, Natasha tears Jay’s clothes off, having rekindled her interest after seeing him with Sam. In the encounter, Jay realizes he is finally over her. He takes back the love memento he gave her and leaves. Feeling guilty about his sudden recognition of his feelings for Sam, he calls Max and discovers that Max has slept with his makeup artist, Dara.

Jay rushes to Sam’s apartment but loses his nerve and goes home instead, drinking heavily. Max finds him there and confronts him about Sam. After a heated altercation, they agree to go to Sam and let her decide what she truly wants.

Over a meal, Jay declares his love for Sam and kisses her. Max is shocked but then begins to laugh, assuming it is a joke, and reveals the fidelity test he had asked Jay to perform. Upset, Sam leaves, cutting ties with both men. Max and Samantha refuse to talk to each other.

Jay moves to New York City. Max finally reads the book he had previously recommended and realizes he needs to reunite Jay and Sam. When Jay returns to Chicago for his book signing, Max leaves him a note asking him to meet at a restaurant and enlists Dre to bring Sam there as well. Once they are seated separately, Max has notes delivered to both of them.

At their wedding, Max gives them his blessing, remarking, “Love cannot be found where it does not exist, nor can it be hidden where it truly does.” Jay and Sam dance together, while Max dances with Linda, implying the beginning of a relationship between them.

== Cast ==
- David Schwimmer as Max Abbitt
- Jason Lee as Jay Murphy
- Mili Avital as Samantha Andrews
- Bonnie Hunt as Linda Streicher
- Vanessa Angel as Natasha
- Kari Wuhrer as Dara
- Frank Medrano as Cliff Randal
- Bitty Schram as Vicki Pelam
- Judy Greer as Andrea "Dre"
- Ron Beattie as Priest
- Doug Ellin as The Bartender / Springer Guest
- Tag Mendillo as Wedding Guest At Bar / Springer Guest
- Justine Bentley as Beautiful Woman At Bar
- Liza Cruzat as Dara's Friend
- Jessica Mills as Dara's Friend #2
- Sammy Sosa as Himself
- Jerry Springer as Himself
- Mike Squire as Spanish Man In Bed
- Marco Siviero as French Man In Bed
- Steve Seagren as Heckler
- Philip R. Smith as Fan On The Street
- Jayson Fate as Rudolpho
- Ross Bon as Blue Kings Lead Singer
- Antimo Fiore as Tony

== Production ==
- Avital joined the cast for the film in July 1997.
- The film was shot in Chicago, based on Schwimmer’s idea.
- Lee had a first leading role for the film.
- Schwimmer made suggestions to ideas for re-writes and playing a sportscaster. He is credited as an executive producer for the film.
- Schwimmer starred in a leading role for this film, in order to break away from the television series, Friends.

== Reception ==
Kissing a Fool received mostly negative reviews from critics, earning a 29% rating on Rotten Tomatoes, based on 31 reviews. Audiences polled by CinemaScore gave the film an average grade of "C+" on an A+ to F scale.

== Box office ==
The film's budget was US$19 million and the box office took in US$4.107 million.

== Soundtrack ==
Joseph Vitarelli composed the music for the film. The soundtrack was released on March 24, 1998.

Track listing

1. "Baby Drives Me Wild" – The Mighty Blue Kings
2. "Leaving Town"
3. "The Girl Who Is"
4. "The Green Mill" – The Mighty Blue Kings
5. "Spark of My Life" – The Mighty Blue Kings
6. "Here She Comes"
7. "Visiting Natassia"
8. "Bad Date"
9. "Grinnin' Like a Chessy Cat" – The Mighty Blue Kings
10. "Pure Rental"
11. "Jay Alone"
12. "Martinis"
13. "The Toast"
14. "At Last" – Etta James

Other notable songs are not in the soundtrack include:

- "We Are in Love" – Harry Connick Jr.
- "Ready for Love" – Bad Company
- "All Out of Love" – Air Supply
- "Learn to Love" – Harry Connick Jr.
- "Last" – Gravity Kills
- "Crazy" – Cordrazine
- "Be Your Own" – Rebekah

== Locations ==
Filmed in Chicago, Illinois, Kissing a Fool utilises several locations within the area. Amongst them are:

- Lincoln Park Zoo
- The Green Mill Jazz Club
- Wrigley Field
- Outside the Seventeenth Church of Christ Scientist building
- Ambria Restaurant at 2300 N. Lincoln Park W., which closed in June 2007
- Lake Bluff's bluff was used as the back drop for the film's wedding scenes
