= Camille Saviola =

Italian-American actress and singer (1950–2021)

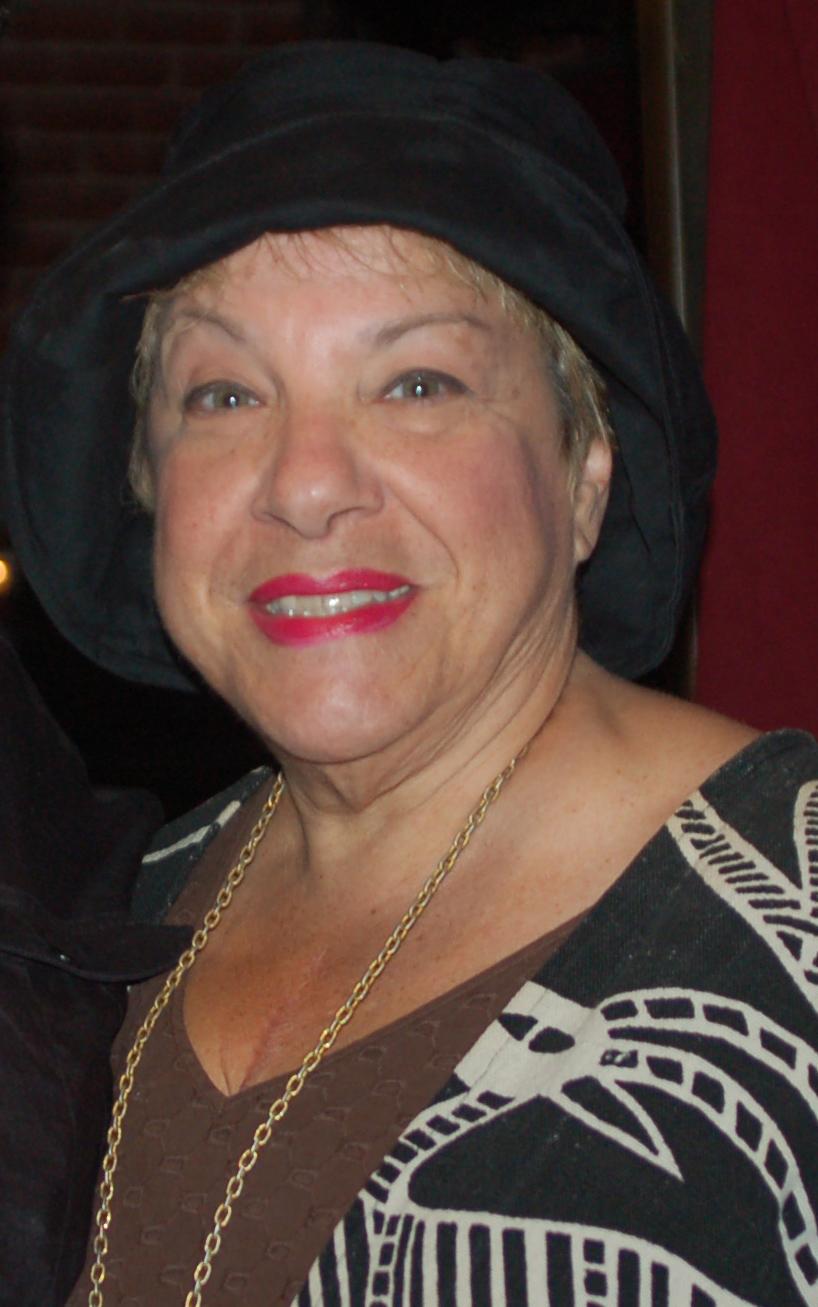
- Saviola in 2010
- Born: July 16, 1950; The Bronx, New York, U.S.
- Died: October 28, 2021 (aged 71); Hackensack, New Jersey, U.S.
- Education: High School of Music & Art
- Occupations: Actress; singer; songwriter
- Years active: 1970–2021

Camille Saviola (July 16, 1950 – October 28, 2021) was an American actress and singer. She appeared in numerous films, television series, plays and musicals.

== Early life ==
Saviola was born in The Bronx, New York City, New York, the daughter of Mary (née d'Esopo) and Michael Saviola. She grew up near Yankee Stadium and graduated from the High School of Music and Art, then attended college for one year before dropping out to get into acting. Camille became lead singer of the Margo Lewis Explosion rock band in the 1970s and was signed to a disco contract in the late 1970s.

== Career ==
Throughout the next 25 years, Saviola performed in theater, television, and films. She was best known for her supporting roles, especially as Italian, Latino or Jewish characters. She also appeared in four episodes of Star Trek: Deep Space Nine as Bajoran religious leader, Kai Opaka.

In addition to her performance as Mama Maddelena in Tommy Tune's original Broadway production of Nine, Broadway audiences saw her Matron Mama Morton in the revival of Chicago. She received a CableACE Award nomination for Best Supporting Actress in the made-for-cable movie, Nightlife.

== Personal life and death ==
Saviola died from heart failure in Hackensack, New Jersey, on October 28, 2021, at the age of 71.

== Awards ==
- Back Stage West Garland Awards, 2007 award for her role in Zorba

== Filmography ==
Year	Title	Role	Notes
1984	Broadway Danny Rose	Lady at Party	
1985	The Purple Rose of Cairo	Olga	
1985	Remington Steele	Shirley Tannenbaum	Episode: "Steele in the Chips"
1986	Weekend Warriors	Betty Beep	
1987	CBS Summer Playhouse	Belle Meyers	Episode: "Son of Gunz"
1989	Penn & Teller Get Killed	Airport Security Guard	
1989	Last Exit to Brooklyn	Ella	
1989	Baby Boom	Ofelia	Episode: "When It Rains"
1990	Nightlife	Rosa Mercedes	
1990	Betsy's Wedding	Angelica	
1991	Queens Logic	Madame Rosa	
1991	All I Want for Christmas	Sonya	
1992	Shadows and Fog	Landlady	
1992	L.A. Law	Dr. Bernardi	Episode: "Christmas Stalking"
1992	The Heights	Shelley Abramowitz	6 episodes
1992–1993	Civil Wars	Louise Iannello	Episode: "Captain Kangaroo Court"; Episode: "Denise and De Nuptials"; Episode: "Mob Psychology"
1993	Addams Family Values	Concetta	
1994	Friends	Mitzi	Episode: "The One With the East German Laundry Detergent"
1995	Stuart Saves His Family	Roz Weinstock	
1995	Hope & Gloria	Cookie	Episode: "Love with an Improper Stranger"; Episode: "Salon, It's Been Good to Know You"
1995	The West Side Waltz		TV movie
1995	NYPD Blue	Evelyn Sekzer	Episode: Curt
1996	Mr. Wrong	Consuela	
1993–1996	Star Trek: Deep Space Nine	Kai Opaka	Episode: "Emissary"; Episode: "Battle Lines"; Episode: "The Collaborator"; Episode: "Accession"
1996	Sunset Park	Barbara	
1997	Living Single	Mabel	Episode: "He's The One"
1998	L.A. Doctors	Maureen Hart	Episode: "Nate Expectations
1999	Becker	Mrs. Corigliani	Episode: "P.C. World"
2000	JAG	Janet Vitaglianso	Episode: "Florida Straits"
2001	Some of My Best Friends	Connie Zito	Episode: "Pilot"; Episode: "Scenes from an Italian Party"; Episode: "The Marriage Counselor"
2002	First Monday	Justice Esther Weisenberg	13 episodes
2004	ER	Margaret	Episode: "Twas the Night"
2002–2005	Judging Amy	Molly Babitz; Atty. Molly Babitz; Mr. Powell's Attorney	Episode: "Getting Out"; Episode: "The Song That Never Ends"; Episode: "Lost and Found"
2005	E-Ring	Secretary of Colonel McNulty	Episode: "Pilot"
2007	Lez Be Friends	Older Ritta	
2007	Standoff	Sofia Marcovich	Episode: "Severance"
2008	Saving Grace	Burn unit nurse	Episode: "Are You an Indian Princess?"
2008	Without a Trace	Camilla Russo	Episode: "Push Comes to Shove"
2006–2009	Entourage	Turtle's Mom	Episode: "One Car, Two Car, Red Car, Blue Car"; Episode: "Return to Queens Blvd."; Episode: "Aquamom"
2009	Nip/Tuck	Agent Sonja Thomas	Episode: "Wesley Clovis"
2012	Silent But Deadly	Fanny	
2015	To Whom It May Concern	Miss Bloomfield	
2015	Staten Island Summer	Mrs. Bandini	
