= Here to Heaven =

2001 studio album by Jamie-Lynn Sigler

Studio album by Jamie-Lynn Sigler
- Released: October 16, 2001
- Studios: Battery Studios (New York); Big Baby Recording (New York); Gallery Studios (New York)
- Genre: Teen pop
- Length: 45:18
- Labels: Edel Music; BAB Music
- Producers: Jerry Ade; The Berman Brothers

Singles from Here to Heaven
- 1. "Cry Baby" Released: June 4, 2002

Here to Heaven is the only studio album by American actress and singer Jamie-Lynn Sigler, released on October 16, 2001 through Edel and BAB Music. It was supported by the release of the single "Cry Baby".

== Track listing ==
1. "Cry Baby"
2. "Bada Bing"
3. "Pressure"
4. "He Wouldn't Listen to My Dreams"
5. "Olé Olé"
6. "Little Mr. Heartbreak"
7. "You Are My Heart (Tu Eres)"
8. "Giving Up on You"
9. "Come with Me"
10. "Sin Ti (Without You)"
11. "Olé Olé" (Spanish Version)
12. "Sin Ti (Without You)" (Spanish Version)
13. "You Are My Heart (Tu Eres)" (Spanish Version)

== Charts ==
Chart performance for Here to Heaven
| Chart (2001) | Peak position |
|---|---|
| US Heatseekers Albums (Billboard) | 32 |
| US Independent Albums (Billboard) | 24 |
