= She's Too Young =

- Written by: Richard Kletter
- Directed by: Tom McLoughlin
- Starring: Alexis Dziena; Mike Erwin; Marcia Gay Harden; Megan Park; Miriam McDonald
- Music by: Mark Snow
- Countries of origin: Canada; United States
- Original language: English

Production
- Producers: Michael Mahoney; Bruce Miller
- Cinematography: Bill Wong
- Editor: Charles Bornstein
- Running time: 88 minutes
- Production companies: Bleecker Street Films; Jaffe/Braunstein Films; Magic Rock Productions

Original release
- Network: Lifetime Television
- Release: February 16, 2004

She's Too Young is an American-Canadian coproduced made-for-TV movie released in 2004, starring Marcia Gay Harden as the mother of a 14-year-old daughter who is involved in sexual acts hidden from her parents. The film deals with the issues of drugs and alcohol, peer pressure, parenting an adolescent, the influence of the sexually-driven media, teen partying, and syphilis. The movie was shot in Halifax, Nova Scotia, with the school scenes being shot at Halifax West High School.

Though the film does not acknowledge this outwardly, the events of this film were partly inspired by a syphilis outbreak that occurred in a well-off suburb of Atlanta in 1996, where over 200 teenagers were exposed. The incident was chronicled in a Frontline episode called "The Lost Children of Rockdale County".

== Plot ==
The film showcases three 14-year-old girls: Dawn, Becca and Hannah. Hannah soon finds herself on the receiving end of peer pressure from her friends to engage in oral sex with Nick, a nice boy whom Hannah likes. She believes that she has to behave in a particular fashion in order to fit in with her more sexually-active peers. As Hannah becomes more sexually "advanced", she does not reveal her sexual encounters with Nick to her mother, who is concerned about Hannah. Hannah regards her mother's concern as being intrusive, knowing she would be shocked if she knew. When Hannah's best friend Dawn gets syphilis, the school nurses begin widespread testing. It soon becomes evident that the school is experiencing an epidemic. Although Nick is identified as the main spreader of the disease, he does not appreciate the serious nature of the issue and refuses to be tested, mocking those who undergo testing. Dawn reluctantly gets tested and discovers that she has contracted the disease. She realizes the consequences of her behavior and encourages her friends to get tested as well. Hannah notices a sore in her mouth one morning and decides to see the nurse, who tells Hannah that she is also infected. Thus, Hannah is forced to deal with the consequences of her actions. When Hannah's mother finds out about the syphilis spread, she launches an effort to alert parents about their children's dangerous behavior. Although she is certain that other parents will share her level of concern in helping their children, she is shocked by some of the parents' indifferent attitudes to their children's actions.

Meanwhile, Becca is outraged when her religious parents (who do not know about her sexual history) decide to send her to boarding school, and Hannah is alienated at school because of her mother. She leaves her house one night and goes to her friend Tommy's house. They both realize they like each other and make out. Hannah wants to have sex, but Tommy refuses, explaining that he likes her but wishes to wait, as they are too young. Hannah becomes even more emotionally distraught, thinking he is not interested because she has been called a 'slut' and runs off. When Hannah's parents return home and see that she is gone, her mother goes off to find her. Walking around by herself in the street, Hannah calls Dawn and Becca. Dawn is grounded and is not allowed to speak with Hannah, and Becca is making out in a car with two boys and does not hear her phone. Hannah goes to a party, where many of the kids from her school are present, looking for Becca. Brad, the party's host, directs Hannah to the basement, and when she realizes that Becca is not there, he attempts to have sex with her. She refuses, but he tries to force her into it. Tommy barges into the room, takes a picture of Brad and threatens to send it to 9-1-1. Brad leaves Hannah and ends the party. Tommy takes Hannah back to his house and calls her parents. They come to fetch her, relieved to see she is alright. Hannah apologizes to them and her mother promises that things will be better from now on. The end of the film shows Becca has snuck back into her room and begins to cry. Dawn is playing Scrabble with her mother as her sister, Tess, who is not playing, sneaks off to Dawn's room. In there, she picks up one of Dawn's "sexy" shirts, takes off her glasses and models in front of the mirror, implying she may try to be 'like Dawn'. At the end of the film, Alexis Dziena appears to give a public service announcement urging teens to wait to have sex because of both physical and emotional consequences.

== Cast ==
- Alexis Dziena as Hannah Vogul
- Miriam McDonald as Dawn Gensler
- Megan Park as Becca White
- Marcia Gay Harden as Trish Vogul
- Gary Hudson as Bill Vogul
- Mike Erwin as Nick Hartman
- Joe Dinicol as Tommy
- John White as Brad
- Deborah Odell as Ginnie Gensler
- Rhonda McLean as Kathleen White
- Christine Dunsworth as Heather
- Stan Carew as Principal Jessup
- Mary-Colin Chisholm as Nurse Johnson

== Production ==
She's Too Young was shot in Nova Scotia. The film's soundtrack, which included two different raunchy rap songs, was largely uncredited, although the main background score was created by composer Mark Snow. Cinematography was done by Bill Wong. Some iconic Nova Scotian buildings to appear in the film include Halifax West High School and The Stardust Motel.

== Reception ==
She's Too Young received largely mixed to negative reviews from critics. Upon its initial release, there was very little attention to the film, although The Movie Scene stated of it, "She's Too Young tries to be a hip sex education movie not just for teenagers but also parents who are blinkered to their teenager's habits. But it tries to do too much, cover every possible angle and by doing so it comes across as forced, extreme and at times sadly corny." The film received mild renewed attention in the 2010s, due in part to a number of popular YouTube influencers reviewing and mocking the film. In 2021, Wide Open Country noted that one of the main cast members for She's Too Young, Megan Park, had since become a film director and credited her early roles in TV movies as part of her inspiration.
