= Cassidy Lehrman =

American actress (born 1992)

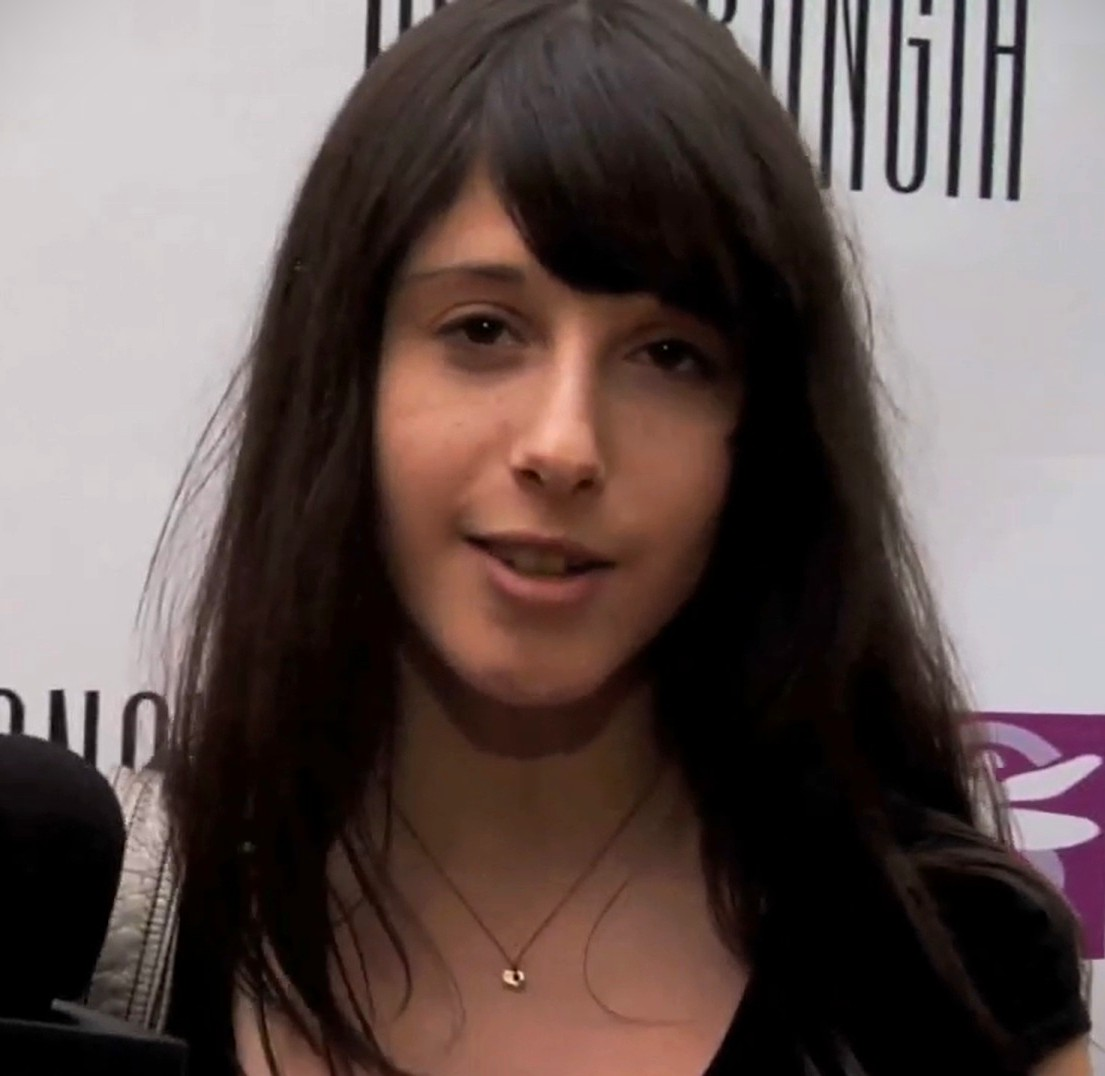
- Lehrman in 2009
- Occupation: Actress
- Years active: 2005–2014

Cassidy Sage Lehrman is an American actress. She is best known for her recurring role as Sarah Gold in the HBO television series Entourage.

== Filmography ==
Title	Role	Media	Year(s)
Murdered: Soul Suspect	Joy Foster	Video Game	2014
Entourage	Sarah Gold	Television	2005–2011
A New Color	Tanya Teller	Film	2009
A Single Woman	Young Jeannette Rankin	Film	2008
Gilmore Girls	Laura	Television	2006
Everybody Hates Chris	Joy	Television	2006
