= Jordan Belfi =

American actor (born 1978)

- Born: November 30, 1978 (age 47); Los Angeles, California, U.S.
- Occupation: Actor
- Years active: 1990–present
- Spouse: Rachelle Dimaria (m. 2018)
- Children: 2

Jordan Belfi (born November 30, 1978) is an American actor. He is best known for his roles as Adam Davies on Entourage (2004–2009), Josh Lindsey on Moonlight (2007–2008), and Principal Ed London on All American (2018–2022).

== Early life ==
Belfi was born in Los Angeles, California and graduated from Wesleyan University in 2000.

== Career ==
In 2004, Belfi appeared briefly in the Gilmore Girls season 5 episode "The Party's Over".

Belfi had a role on HBO's Entourage from 2004 to 2009, in which he played agent Adam Davies, the nemesis of Ari Gold (Jeremy Piven). Belfi appears semi-regularly over seasons 1 and 2, and made a single appearance in season 3, and two appearances in season 5.

Belfi had a recurring guest star role in the CBS series Moonlight from 2007 to 2008, starring as the female lead's boyfriend.

He also guest starred on Hawaii Five-0 as Spenser Owens in season 1 episode 14 "He Kane Hewa' Ole." In 2012, he guest starred on two episodes of Grey's Anatomy as Nick during season 8.

== Personal life ==
Belfi has been married to actress and producer Rachelle Dimaria since 2018. In June 2021, the couple announced that they were expecting their first child. Their son was born on December 1, 2021.

== Filmography ==
=== Film ===
Year	Title	Role	Notes
1990	Elephant in the Living Room		
1993	Remote	Ben	Direct-to-video
2002	Sex and the Teenage Mind	Scott	
2005	Homecoming	Gregg	
2006	Pope Dreams	Lucas Bowman	
2007	The Trouble with Romance	Charlie	
2007	Mexican Sunrise	Ryan	
2007	Ten Inch Hero	Fuzzy22	
2008	Remarkable Power	Skip	
2009	Surrogates	Victor Welch	
2010	Christina	Billy Calvert	
2010	Bedrooms	Julian	
2010	Across the Line: The Exodus of Charlie Wright	Jimmy	
2012	The Millionaire Tour	Greg	
2012	The Sacred	Brian	
2013	Chlorine	Doug	
2013	Pawn	Lt. Patrick Davenport	
2014	Beyond the Lights	Steve Sams	
2016	Badlands of Kain	Mack	
2016	Better Criminal	Detective William Doyle	
2017	Saturn Returns	Doug	
2017	Ex-Wife Killer	Michael	
2018	American Curious	David	
2019	Foster Boy	Jeff Masters	
2020	The Billionaire	Julius Sagamore	
2021	Violet	Ron Moore	
2022	Don't Look at the Demon	Matty	
2022	The Mistress	Matty	
2023	Nefarious	Dr. James Martin	
2023	V/H/S/85	Dr. Pike Spratling	Frame segment: "Total Copy"
TBA	Reminisce	Max	Post-production

=== Television ===
Year	Title	Role	Notes
1999	Undressed	Joey	Episode: "Seeing Eye Dog"
1999	Sabrina the Teenage Witch	John	Episode: "Dream a Little Dreama Me"
2001	Power Rangers Time Force	Walter Brown	Episode: "Legend of the Clock Tower"
2001	Buffy the Vampire Slayer	Ryan	Episode: "Smashed"
2003	American Dreams	Stephen Patterson	Episode: "Down the Shore"
2004	Gilmore Girls	Jordan Chase	Episode: "The Party's Over"
2004–2009	Entourage	Adam Davies	Recurring role (seasons 1–6)
2005	Breadwinners	David Townsend	TV movie
2006	Drake & Josh Go Hollywood	Mitch Gordon	TV movie
2006	Love, Inc.	Kent	Episode: "Friends"
2006	Pepper Dennis	Sheldon Zorn	Episode: "Charlie Babcock's Homosexual Encounter"
2006, 2007	Close to Home	John Marinelli / John Martinelli	2 episodes
2007	Smallville	Mack	Episode: "Trespass"
2007	Shark	Neal Donovan	3 episodes
2007	Justice	Craig Winters	Episode: "False Confession"
2007	The Singles Table	Doug	3 episodes
2007	Spellbound	Collin	TV movie
2007–2008	Moonlight	Josh Lindsey	7 episodes
2008	Without a Trace	Rob Simms	Episode: "Better Angels"
2009	CSI: Miami	Neil Palmer	Episode: "Dead on Arrival"
2010	Ghost Whisperer	Bruce Adler	Episode: "Dead Air"
2010	Look: The Series	Andy	3 episodes
2011	Hawaii Five-0	Spenser Owens	Episode: "He Kane Hewa' Ole (An Innocent Man)"
2011	The Mentalist	Wes Attwood	Episode: "Red Gold"
2011	Melissa & Joey	Fletcher McKay	Episode: "Waiting for Mr. Right"
2011	Charlie's Angels	Mitch Dawson	Episode: "Runway Angels"
2011, 2013	Castle	Beau Randolph	2 episodes
2011, 2015	NCIS: Los Angeles	Dennis Calder / Tom Blanchard	2 episodes
2012	Bones	Special Agent Andy Lister / Blaine Conway	Episode: "The Suit on the Set"
2012	Grey's Anatomy	Nick	2 episodes
2013	Snow Bride	Benjamin Tannenhill	TV movie for Hallmark Channel
2013	Burn Notice	Cody Ward	Episode: "All or Nothing"
2014	Rizzoli & Isles	Ray Murphy	Episode: "A New Day"
2015	Scandal	Congressman Nicholas Reed	2 episodes
2017	Major Crimes	Richard Bloom	Episode: "Quid Pro Quo"
2017	Chicago Justice	Jaxson Clark	Episode: "Lily's Law"
2018	Code Black	Andrew Ferryman	Episode: "Change of Heart"
2018–2022	All American	Principal Ed Landon	10 episodes
2019	Chicago Fire	Bradley Boyd	2 episodes
2019	The Rookie	Ross "Corkscrew" Tegan	Episode: "Warriors and Guardians"
2019	9-1-1	Chase Mackey	2 episodes
2021	All Rise	Rob Tartan	Episode: "Chasing Waterfalls"
2021	Good Girls	Z	6 episodes
2021	FBI: International	Gary Milgrave	Episode: "The Edge"
2021	NCIS: Hawaiʻi	Alan Shipley	Episode: "Legacy"
2022	The Neighborhood	Stan	Episode: "Welcome to the Mama Drama"
2022	Law & Order: Special Victims Unit	Spencer Lewis	Episode: "Controlled Burn"
2022	The Resident	David Costican	Episode: "The Better Part of Valor"
2023	The Good Doctor	Gavin Ross	Episode: "The Good Lawyer"
2023	Magnum P.I.	Brent Urima	Episode: "Birthright"
