= Ally Musika =

American writer and television producer

Ally Musika (born April 26, 1979) is an American writer and executive producer of the HBO television series Entourage. In a documentary entitled Entourage, Season 8 - A Look Back, Doug Ellin said Musika wrote "every other word" of the show "for the last six years". She had begun on the show as Ellin's assistant.

Her acting debut, as the character Lily on Entourage, was in Season 5, Episode 2: “Unlike a Virgin".

In 2010 she was reported to be working on a "femme-themed project" for HBO. In 2015 it was reported she was working with Mark Wahlberg and Stephen Levinson on another HBO show.
