= Rex Lee (actor) =

American actor (born 1969)

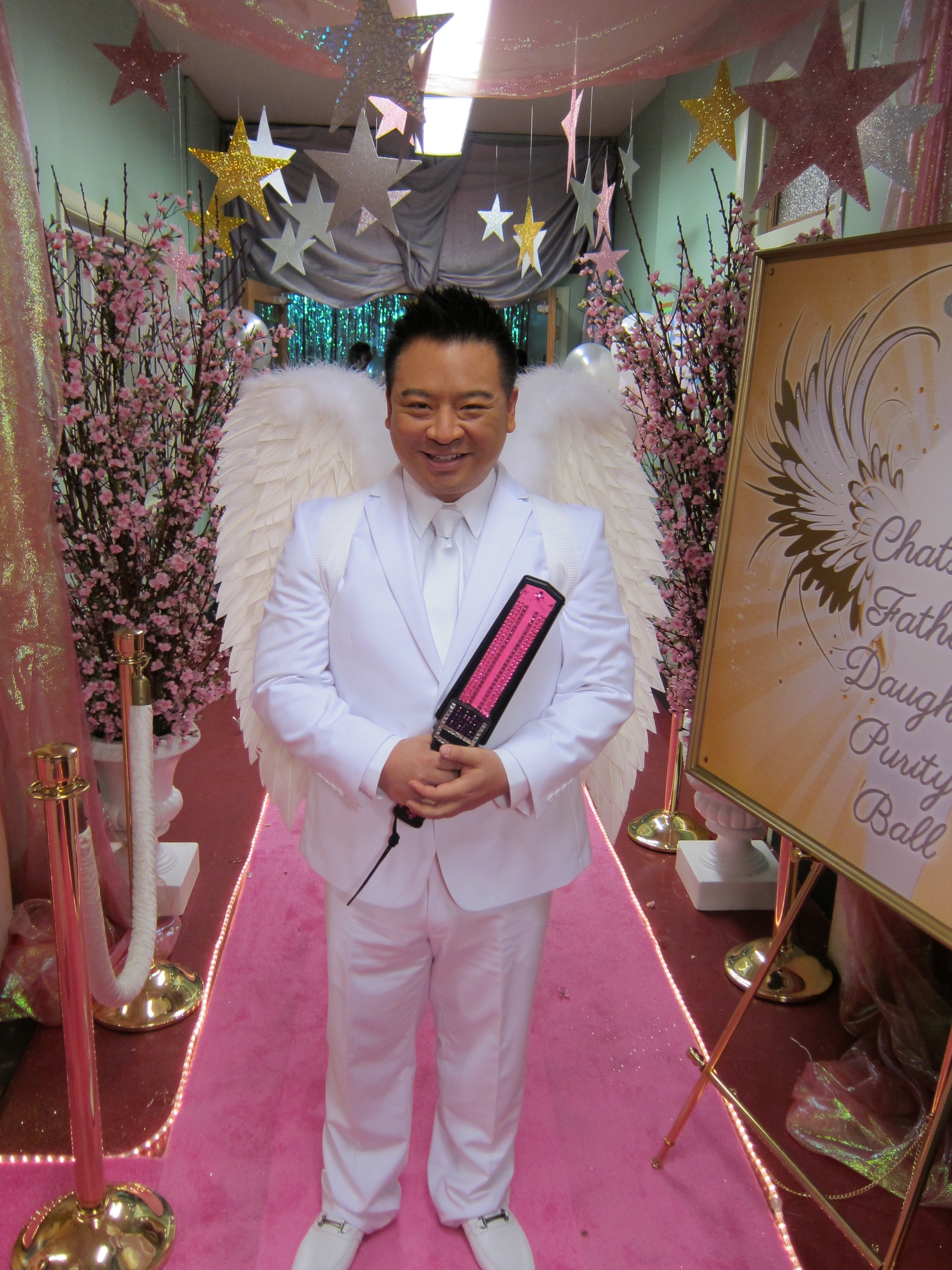
- Lee in 2013
- Born: January 7, 1969 (age 56); Warren, Ohio, U.S.
- Education: Oberlin College
- Occupation: Actor
- Years active: 1994–present

Rex Lee (born January 7, 1969) is an American actor. He is best known for his role as Lloyd Lee in the HBO series Entourage (2005–2011), as Mr. Wolfe in ABC's sitcom Suburgatory (2011–2013) and as Elliot Park in the sitcom Young & Hungry (2014–2018).

== Early life ==
Lee was born in Warren, Ohio, and grew up in the Massachusetts cities of Somerville, Woburn, and Newton. He graduated from the Oberlin Conservatory of Music in 1990. Although Lee was studying to be a professional pianist, he decided he wanted to act after taking a theater class in college.

== Career ==
Prior to landing the role on Entourage, Lee had various jobs including performing in the children's theater company, Imagination Company, as well as working as a casting assistant. He was the casting director for the TV movie The Cure for a Diseased Life. Lee has also played roles on a variety of TV shows, including Twins, What About Brian and Maurice on two episodes of Zoey 101.

On Entourage, Lee played Lloyd Lee, the gay assistant to Ari Gold, the character played by Jeremy Piven — eventually becoming an agent and interim head of TMA's television department. Lee began his role in the first episode of the show's second season, "The Boys Are Back in Town", which introduced Lloyd as the replacement to Ari's previous assistant. Lee won the award for Outstanding Supporting Actor, Television at the AZN Asian Excellence Awards in 2007 and 2008.

Lee had a series regular role in the first two seasons of the ABC sitcom Suburgatory, playing Mr. Wolfe, a clueless high school guidance counselor. He appeared as one of the judges at Nationals in the Fox Television Comedy-Drama Glee in season 3. In 2014, he had a starring role in the ABC Family (later rebranded as Freeform) television sitcom Young & Hungry where he plays Elliot Park, the publicist and "right-hand man" to a young tech entrepreneur named Josh. Young & Hungry ran for five seasons, concluding in 2018.

In 2015, Lee appeared in an episode of Fresh Off the Boat as Jessica Huang's college boyfriend, Oscar Chow. Lee plays a talent agent in the 2015 "#ItsThatEasy" celebrity-themed ad campaign for website company Wix.com.

== Personal life ==
Lee is gay; he came out to his parents when he was 22.

In an interview from 2011, Lee said that he was single and looking for something permanent, but that it was difficult to find the right relationship.

== Filmography ==
=== Film ===
Year	Title	Role	Notes
1999	Word of Mouth	Justin	
2008	Shades of Ray	Dale	
2015	Advantageous	Drake	
2015	Entourage	Lloyd Lee	
2015	Girl on the Edge	Travis Lee	
2017	Lemon	Jazz	
2018	For the Love of George	Justin	
2020	Feel the Beat	Wellington 'Welly' Wong	
2021	Keeping Company	Brent	

=== Television ===
Year	Title	Role	Notes
1994	Dave's World	Ticket Taker	Episode: "I Lost It at the Movies"
1996	America's Most Wanted	Choi	Episode: "Chang and Choi"
2001	The Huntress	Coordinator	Episode: "Diva"
2002	Son of the Beach	Bellboy	Episode: "Empty the Dragon"
2003	Andy Richter Controls the Universe	Asian Man	Episode: "Charity Begins in Cellblock D"
2003	Lucky	Jack	Episode: "Savant"
2005	Twins	Kenny	Episode: "Twist of Fate"
2005–2011	Entourage	Lloyd Lee	Recurring role (season 2); Starring (seasons 3–4); Main role (seasons 5–8)
2006	What About Brian	Jeremy	Episode: "The Importance of Being Brian"
2008	Zoey 101	Maitre D'	Episode: "Dinner for Two Many"
2010	Glenn Martin, DDS	Gay Guy	Episode: "Tooth Fairy"
2011–2013	Suburgatory	Mr. Wolfe	Main role (seasons 1–2)
2012	The Secret Policeman's Ball	Kim Jong-un	TV special
2012	Glee	Alderman Martin Fong	Episode: "Nationals"
2013	Dan Vs.	Voice	Episode: "Dan Vs. The Ski Trip"
2014	Castle	Yumi	Episode: "Dressed to Kill"
2014–2018	Young & Hungry	Elliot Park	Main role
2015	Fresh Off the Boat	Oscar Chow	Episodes: "Blind Spot" and "Huangsgiving"
