= Mark Mylod =

English television director and producer

- Occupations: Director; producer
- Spouse: Amy Westcott
- Children: 4

Mark Mylod is an English director and executive producer of film and television. He began his career directing comedy shows such as Shooting Stars, The Fast Show, and The Royle Family, for which he received two BAFTA TV Awards.

After transitioning into directing episodes of drama series (including Entourage, The Affair, Game of Thrones, and both the British and American versions of Shameless), Mylod became known for his work as a director and executive producer on the drama series Succession (2018–2023), directing 16 episodes and producing 37. He won the Emmy for Outstanding Directing for a Drama Series once and the Directors Guild of America Award for Outstanding Directing – Drama Series once.

Mylod also directed the films Ali G Indahouse (2002), The Big White (2005), What's Your Number? (2011), and The Menu (2022).

== Career ==
Mylod has directed several television shows in the United Kingdom and the United States, many of them for the BBC. He directed the feature films Ali G Indahouse, The Big White, and What's Your Number? as well as the series Cold Feet, The Royle Family, and Bang Bang, It's Reeves and Mortimer.

Mylod co-produced the HBO television series Entourage, where he was also a regular director. He would direct and executive-produce the pilot episode of the U.S. version of the dramedy, Shameless, for Showtime. He remained a co-executive producer and frequent director on the series.

In 2011, Mylod directed and executive produced the pilot of the ABC fantasy series Once Upon a Time. He would go on to direct the pilot episode for American TV Series The Affair in 2014. In the same year, he directed episodes 3 and 4 of Season 5 of the HBO series Game of Thrones. He returned to the show for Season 6, where he directed episodes 7 and 8 and episodes 2 and 3 of Season 7.

Mylod was a director and executive producer on the HBO drama series Succession (2018–2023), directing 16 episodes and producing 37. He was nominated for the Primetime Emmy Award for Outstanding Directing for a Drama Series three times, for "This Is Not for Tears", "All the Bells Say", and "Connor's Wedding", winning for the latter, as well as winning the Directors Guild of America Award for Outstanding Directing – Drama Series for All the Bells Say.

The Menu (2022), the first film directed by Mylod in 11 years, was released to critical acclaim.

In January 2024, it was announced that Mylod would be a director on the second season of The Last of Us. He was nominated at the 5th Astra Awards for his direction on "Through the Valley".

== Personal life ==
Mylod is married to costume designer Amy Westcott, with whom he has four children.

== Filmography ==
=== Film ===
Year	Title
2002	Ali G Indahouse
2005	The Big White
2011	What's Your Number?
2022	The Menu

=== Television ===
Year	Title	Director	Executive Producer	Notes
1995	The Stand-Up Show	Yes	No	2 episodes
1995	Shooting Stars	Yes	No	2 episodes
1996	All Rise for Julian Clary	Yes	No	7 episodes
1996–2000	The Fast Show	Yes	No	5 episodes
1997	Phil Kay Feels...	Yes	No	
1998	Cold Feet	Yes	No	2 episodes
1998–2006	The Royle Family	Yes	No	7 episodes
1999	Bang, Bang, It's Reeves and Mortimer	Yes	No	6 episodes
1999	The Web of Caves	Yes	No	TV short
1999	The Kidnappers	Yes	No	TV short
2000	Randall and Hopkirk (Deceased)	Yes	No	3 episodes
2000	The Dave Saint Show	Yes	No	
2001	Baddiel's Syndrome	Yes	No	
2004	Shameless	Yes	No	3 episodes
2006–2009	Entourage	Yes	Yes	23 episodes
2008	Welcome to The Captain	Yes	No	Episode: "Weekend at Saul's"
2009	United States of Tara	Yes	No	2 episodes
2009	Washingtonienne	Yes	No	Episode: "Pilot"
2011	Once Upon a Time	Yes	Yes	Episode: "Pilot"
2011–2018	Shameless	Yes	Yes	12 episodes
2014	The Affair	Yes	Yes	Episode: "101"
2015	Backstrom	Yes	Yes	Episode: "Dragon Slayer"
2015	Minority Report	Yes	Yes	Episode: "Pilot"
2015–2017	Game of Thrones	Yes	No	6 episodes
2018–2023	Succession	Yes	Yes	16 episodes
2020	Amazing Stories	Yes	No	Episode: "The Rift"
2025	The Last of Us	Yes	No	Episode: "Through the Valley"
2026–present	Harry Potter	Yes	Yes	

== Awards and nominations ==
Year	Award	Category	Nominated work	Results	Ref.
2022	Astra TV Awards	Best Directing in a Broadcast Network or Cable Series, Drama	Succession (Episode: "All the Bells Say")	Nominated	
2023	Astra TV Awards	Best Directing in a Broadcast Network or Cable Series, Drama	Succession (Episode: "Connor's Wedding")	Won	
1996	British Academy Television Awards	Best Light Entertainment (Programme or Series)	Shooting Stars	Nominated	
1997	British Academy Television Awards	Best Light Entertainment (Programme or Series)	Shooting Stars	Won	
1997	British Academy Television Awards	Best Light Entertainment (Programme or Series)	The Fast Show	Nominated	
1998	British Academy Television Awards	Best Light Entertainment (Programme or Series)	The Fast Show	Won	
1999	British Academy Television Awards	Best Comedy (Programme or Series)	The Royle Family	Nominated	
2019	Directors Guild of America Awards	Outstanding Directorial Achievement in Dramatic Series	Succession (Episode: "This Is Not for Tears")	Nominated	
2021	Directors Guild of America Awards	Outstanding Directorial Achievement in Dramatic Series	Succession (Episode: "All the Bells Say")	Won	
2023	Directors Guild of America Awards	Outstanding Directorial Achievement in Dramatic Series	Succession (Episode: "Connor's Wedding")	Nominated	
2022	Georgia Film Critics Association Awards	Oglethorpe Award	The Menu	Runner-up	
2014	Online Film & Television Association Awards	Best Direction in a Comedy Series	Shameless	Nominated	
2018	Online Film & Television Association Awards	Best Direction in a Drama Series	Game of Thrones	Won	
2009	Primetime Emmy Awards	Outstanding Comedy Series	Entourage	Nominated	
2019	Primetime Emmy Awards	Outstanding Drama Series	Succession	Nominated	
2020	Primetime Emmy Awards	Outstanding Drama Series	Succession	Won	
2020	Primetime Emmy Awards	Outstanding Directing for a Drama Series	Succession (Episode: "This Is Not for Tears")	Nominated	
2022	Primetime Emmy Awards	Outstanding Drama Series	Succession	Won	
2022	Primetime Emmy Awards	Outstanding Directing for a Drama Series	Succession (Episode: "All the Bells Say")	Nominated	
2023	Primetime Emmy Awards	Outstanding Drama Series	Succession	Won	
2023	Primetime Emmy Awards	Outstanding Directing for a Drama Series	Succession (Episode: "Connor's Wedding")	Won	
2025	Primetime Emmy Awards	Outstanding Television Movie	Mountainhead	Nominated	
2009	Producers Guild of America Awards	Outstanding Producer of Episodic Television – Comedy	Entourage	Nominated	
2019	Producers Guild of America Awards	Outstanding Producer of Episodic Television – Drama	Succession	Won	
2021	Producers Guild of America Awards	Outstanding Producer of Episodic Television – Drama	Succession	Won	
2023	Producers Guild of America Awards	Outstanding Producer of Episodic Television – Drama	Succession	Won	
2023	Saturn Awards	Best Film Director	The Menu	Nominated	
