= Alexis Dziena =

American actress (born 1984)

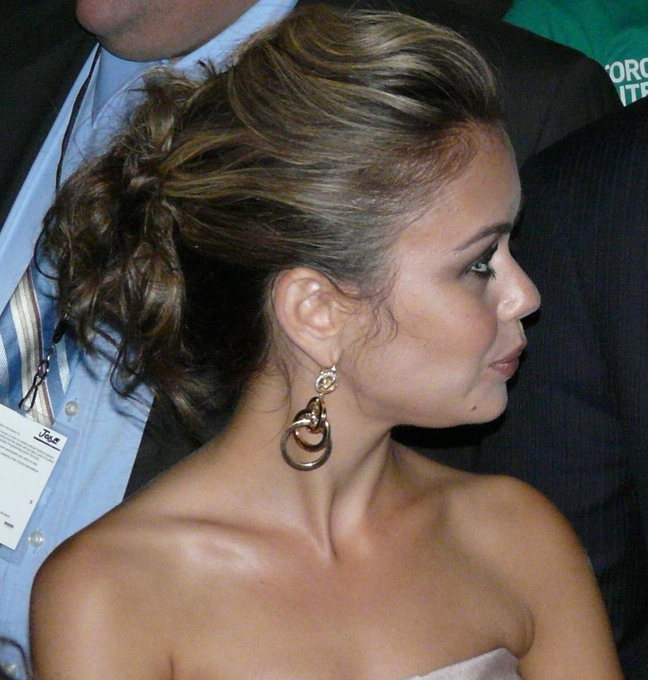
- Dziena in 2008
- Born: Alexis Gabbriel Dziena; July 8, 1984 (age 42); New York City, U.S.
- Occupation: Actress
- Years active: 2002–2014

Alexis Gabbriel Dziena (born July 8, 1984) is an American former actress.

== Early life ==
Dziena was born in 1984 in New York City, and is of Irish, Italian and Polish descent. She attended Saint Ann's School in Brooklyn and studied at the American Academy of Dramatic Arts.

== Career ==
=== Television ===
Dziena made her acting debut in TNT's Witchblade (2002). Guest roles followed in other series, such as Law & Order, Law & Order: Special Victims Unit, and Joan of Arcadia. One of her first major roles was in the Lifetime channel original film She's Too Young (2004), in which she portrayed a sexually active teenager. In the ABC television series Invasion, she played the sheriff's daughter, Kira Underlay. Dziena also appeared frequently on the sixth season of the HBO series Entourage (2009).

=== Feature films ===
Dziena had a small role in the movie Broken Flowers (2005), starring Bill Murray, in which she played Lolita, the daughter of a character played by Sharon Stone. She played Heather, a sexually frustrated young woman who takes part in a couple-swap to save her relationship as part of an experimental therapy in the film Sex and Breakfast (2007). She also co-starred in the films Fool's Gold (2008) and Nick and Norah's Infinite Playlist (2008).

In 2022, Without Ward was released; Dziena shot her scenes for the film in 2012.

== Personal life ==
Dziena dated Michael Pitt between at least 2001 and 2003.

In September 2011, Dziena attempted to get a restraining order against her parents, claiming that she was living in fear of them resorting to "murder or violence" to access her money. Her request was declined by a judge later that month as she had insufficient evidence to support her allegations.

In June 2014, Dziena's ex-boyfriend Jeffrey Francis Ausley was granted a restraining order against Dziena after she showed up at his house with a bag of clothes and announced that she was moving in. Ausley also alleged that she threatened to harm both of them if he ended their relationship.

== Filmography ==
Film
Year	Title	Role	Notes
2003	Season of Youth		
2003	Mimic 3: Sentinel	Rosy Montrose	Direct-to-video
2003	Bringing Rain	Lysee Key	Direct-to-video
2003	Rhinoceros Eyes	Bird Girl	
2003	Wonderland	Gopher's Girlfriend	Scenes deleted
2005	Strangers with Candy	Melissa	
2005	The Great New Wonderful	Angie	Scenes deleted
2005	Broken Flowers	Lolita	
2005	Pizza	Emily	
2005	Havoc	Sasha	
2007	Sex and Breakfast	Heather	
2008	Fool's Gold	Gemma Honeycutt	
2008	Nick & Norah's Infinite Playlist	Tris	
2009	Tenderness	Maria	
2010	When in Rome	Joan	
2012	Wrong	Emma	
2014	My Sister	Ashley Presser	
2022	Without Ward	Scout Finch	Filmed in 2012

Television
Year	Title	Role	Notes
2002	Witchblade	Bola	Episode: "Parabolic"
2003	Law & Order: Special Victims Unit	Mia Van Wagner	Episode: "Pandora"
2003	Law & Order	Lena Parkova	Episode: "House Calls"
2004	She's Too Young	Hannah Vogul	TV movie
2005	Stone Cold	Candace Pennington	TV movie; aka Jesse Stone: Stone Cold
2005	Joan of Arcadia	Bonnie	2 episodes
2005–2006	Invasion	Kira Underlay	Main cast
2007	One Life to Live	Pretty Girl	1 episode
2009	Entourage	Ashley Brooks	Recurring role (season 6)

=== Music video ===
Year	Title	Artist	Role
2002	"What a Wonderful World"	Joey Ramone	Punk Girl
