= Doug Ellin =

American screenwriter and director

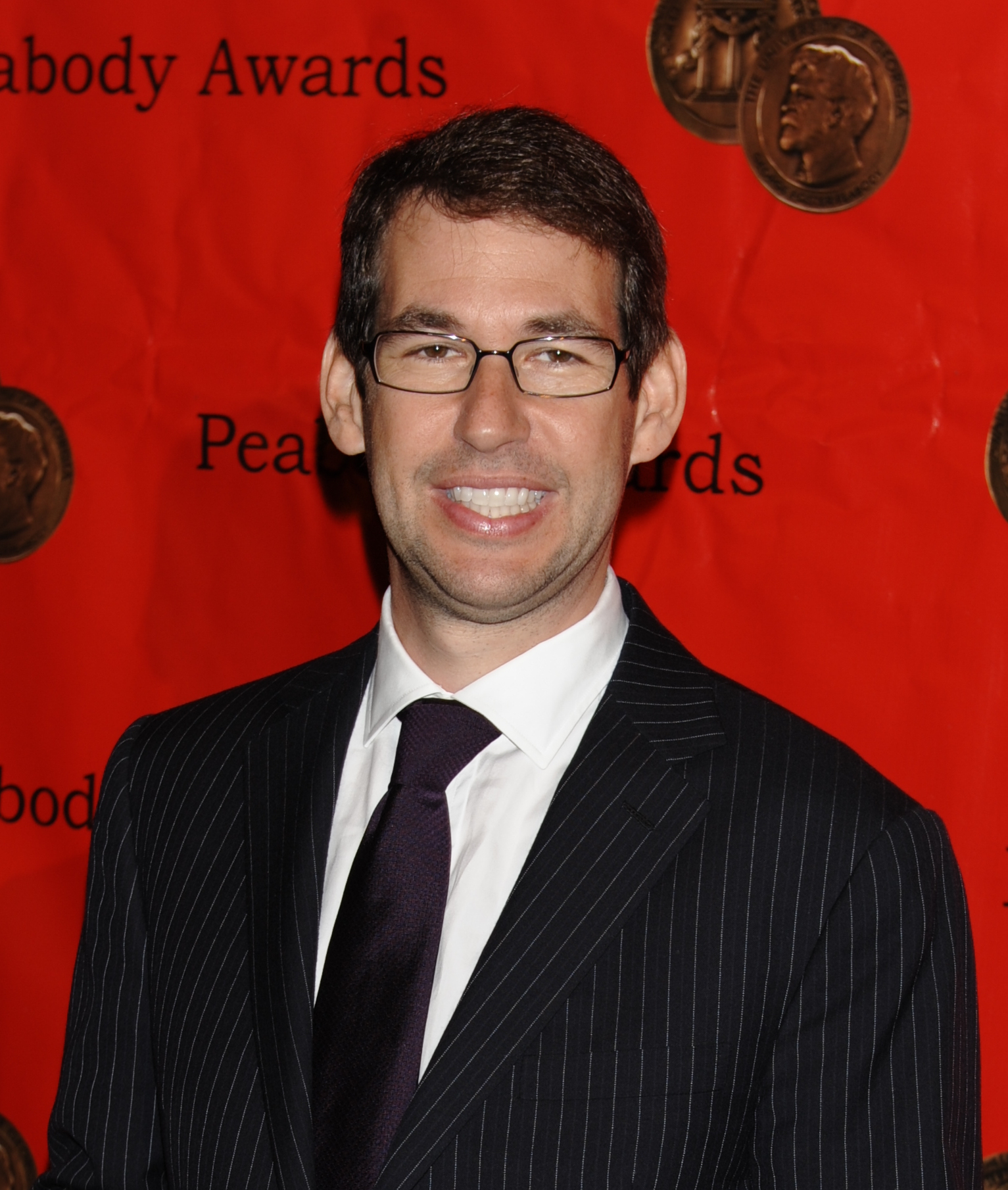
- Ellin in 2009
- Born: Douglas Reed Ellin; 1967 or 1968 (age 58–59); New York City, U.S.
- Education: Tulane University
- Occupations: Screenwriter; producer; director
- Spouses: Melissa Dana Hecht (m. 1996; div. 2009); Andrea Adler (m. 2017; div. 2018)
- Children: 2

Douglas Reed Ellin (born 1967 or 1968) is an American screenwriter and film and TV director, known best for creating the HBO television series Entourage. Ellin also served as executive producer, director, head writer and supporting actor for the series, and wrote, directed and produced its 2015 film adaptation.

== Early life and education ==
Ellin was born in Brooklyn, New York City, the son of June and Marvin Ellin. He is Jewish. Ellin grew up in Merrick, New York, attending John F. Kennedy High School before graduating from Tulane University in 1990.

== Career ==
Before producing and writing for Entourage, Ellin served as a staff writer for Life with Bonnie, which starred Bonnie Hunt. The series ran from 2003-2004. Ellin has also written screenplays for two films, Kissing a Fool and Phat Beach. He moved to Los Angeles in the early 1990s to be a stand-up comedian and soon got a job in the mail room at New Line Cinema. It was there where he befriended film producer Michael De Luca who funded Ellin's first short film The Pitch, starring then unknown actor David Schwimmer. In 1996, he directed the independent comedy film Phat Beach. The film was made on a very low budget, and Ellin has called it "Probably the worst movie ever made". Two years later, Ellin made another independent comedy film Kissing a Fool, starring David Schwimmer, who was now known due to his role on Friends which was in its fourth season.

Kissing a Fool was sold for distribution and Ellin subsequently sold a few screenplays to Miramax. One, The Pledge was never produced although Ellin was paid seven figures for the script and was set to direct. He sold another unproduced screenplay for mid-six figures.

Ellin's real success came in 2004 with Entourage. The HBO show ran for eight seasons and Ellin made an eight-figure pact with HBO to continue producing television.

Additionally, Ellin serves on the board of the Greenwich International Film Festival.

Ellin wrote and directed the 2015 film adaptation of Entourage.

== Personal life ==
Ellin married Melissa Dana Hecht in 1996 and together have two children. The two divorced in 2009. Ellin has said the character of Ari Gold's wife in Entourage was based on Hecht.

Ellin dated Maddie Diehl and proposed to her in 2014, but the couple broke up in March 2016. He married Andrea Adler in September 2017 and filed for divorce in April 2018.

== Filmography ==
Film

Year	Title	Director	Writer
1993	The Waiter	Yes	Yes
1993	The Pitch	Yes	Yes
1996	Phat Beach	Yes	Yes
1998	Kissing a Fool	Yes	Yes
2015	Entourage	Yes	Yes

Producer

- Bull Run (2024)

Television

Year	Title	Creator	Writer	Executive Producer	Notes
2002–2004	Life with Bonnie	No	Yes	No	Staff writer
2004–2011	Entourage	Yes	Yes	Yes	

Actor

Year	Title	Role	Notes
1993	The Pitch	—N/a	
1998	Kissing a Fool	Bartender/Springer guest	
2004–2011	Entourage	Doug/Director	3 episodes
