= Jamie-Lynn Sigler =

American actress (born 1981)

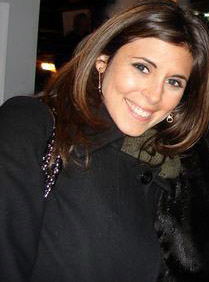
- Sigler in 2007
- Born: May 15, 1981 (age 45); Jericho, New York, U.S.
- Other name: Jamie-Lynn DiScala
- Occupations: Actress; singer
- Years active: 1997–present
- Known for: The Sopranos
- Spouses: A. J. DiScala (m. 2003; div. 2006) Cutter Dykstra (m. 2016)
- Children: 2
- Relatives: Lenny Dykstra (father-in-law)

Jamie-Lynn Sigler (born May 15, 1981) is an American actress and singer. She is best known for her role as Meadow Soprano on the HBO television series The Sopranos from 1999 to 2007.

== Early life ==
Sigler was born in Jericho, New York, on May 15, 1981, the daughter of Steve and Connie Sigler. She has two older brothers, Adam and Brian. Her father was the founder of the Men's Senior Baseball League. Sigler is of Greek-Jewish and Romanian-Jewish descent through her father, and of Cuban descent through her mother.

Sigler's mother was raised Catholic but converted to Judaism upon marrying Sigler's father. She attended Jericho High School and studied at the Cultural Arts Playhouse in Old Bethpage, New York.

== Career ==
=== Acting ===
In 1997, Sigler was cast as Meadow Soprano, daughter of New Jersey mob boss Tony Soprano on the HBO series The Sopranos. When her manager first told her about auditioning for The Sopranos, Sigler thought she would have to sing soprano. She continued to play the role through the series finale in 2007.

Sigler played the title role in Cinderella on tour and at The Theater at Madison Square Garden in 2001. She then spent five months on Broadway from October 2002 through February 2003 playing Belle in Beauty and the Beast.

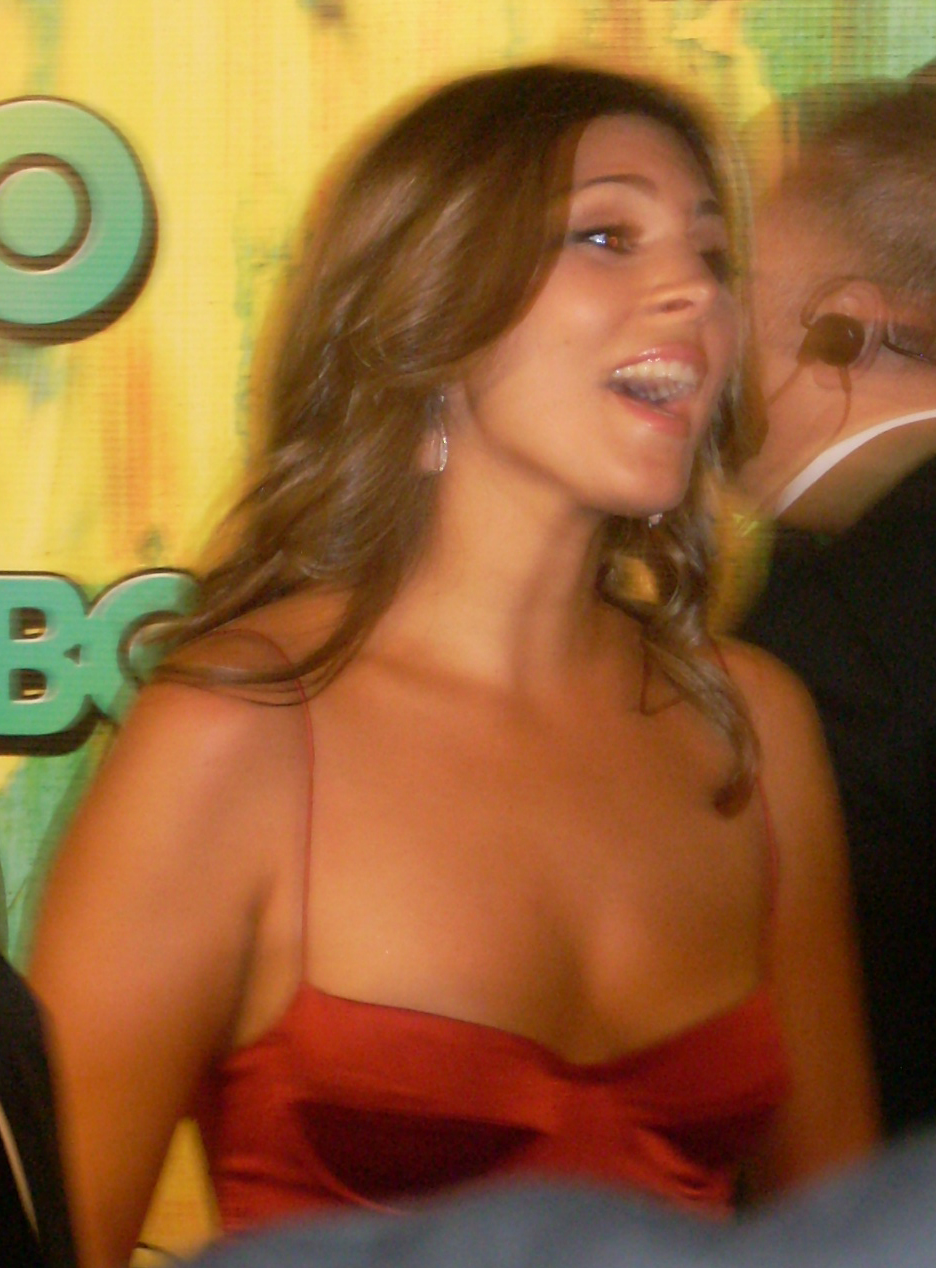
Sigler attending the HBO Post-Emmys Party at the Pacific Design Center in 2008

In 2004, Sigler starred as "Hollywood Madam" Heidi Fleiss in the USA Network television film Call Me: The Rise and Fall of Heidi Fleiss. In that same year, she had her first starring feature film role, Extreme Dating, an independent film. In 2005, Sigler starred in Love Wrecked and the following year in Homie Spumoni, when she played the role of Alli, the girlfriend of Renato/Leroy (Donald Faison) directed by Mike Cerron.

In 2008, Sigler appeared as herself in 13 episodes of the fifth and sixth season of the HBO television series Entourage. In the fifth season, she appeared as the love interest of the character Sal 'Turtle' Assante, portrayed by Jerry Ferrara. She returned as a recurring guest star for season six of the series, after becoming Ferrara's real-life girlfriend. On November 17, 2008, Sigler guest-starred as Jillian on the sitcom How I Met Your Mother in the episode "Woooo!". On the December 6, 2008, airing of Saturday Night Live (SNL), she appeared as the checkout girl for the Digital Short music video "Jizz in My Pants" by the Lonely Island.

In 2009, Sigler starred in the mystery-thriller film Beneath the Dark, which originally had a working title of Wake. The same year, she appeared on ABC's Ugly Betty in a five-episode arc. From 2012 to 2013, she appeared as a main character in the short-lived series Guys with Kids.

In 2019, Sigler appeared on the game show Pyramid alongside fellow Sopranos actor Steve Schirripa.

In 2020, Sigler starred as a featured player in the Adult Swim sitcom Beef House.

=== Other endeavors ===
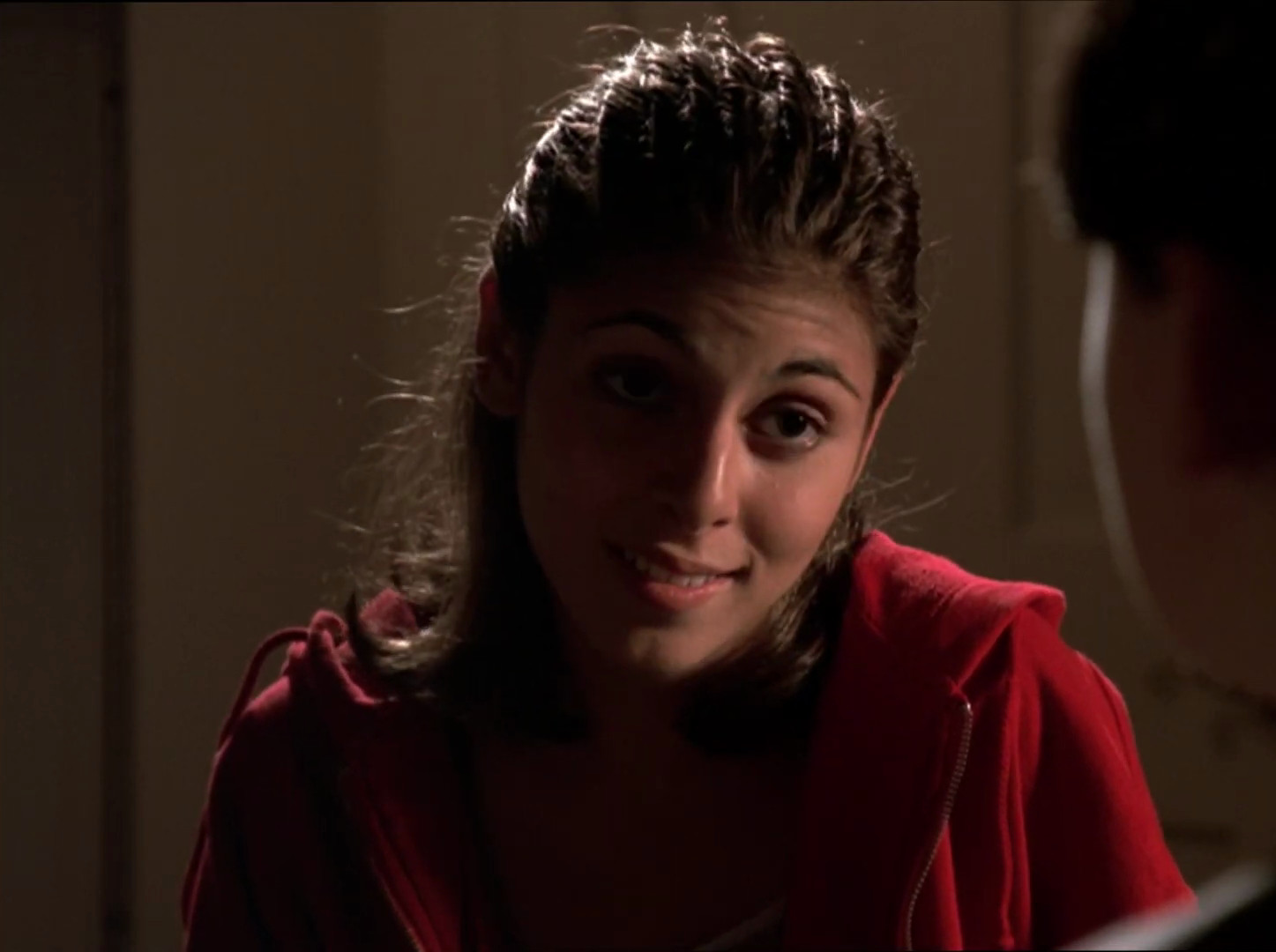
Sigler as Meadow Soprano in The Sopranos

In 2001, Sigler released her sole studio album called Here to Heaven, a teen pop album, which featured the single "Cry Baby." In 2012, she collaborated with Romeo Santos on the single "You" and appeared in its music video.

In 2002, Sigler co-authored her memoir, Wise Girl: What I've Learned About Life, Love, and Loss.

In 2024, Sigler began a podcast with fellow actress Christina Applegate called MeSsy about their friendship based on both being diagnosed with MS. Sigler has credited Applegate with inspiring her to be more public about her own MS condition.

Her memoir, titled And So It Is, was released on May 5, 2026.

== Personal life ==
Sigler met Abraxas "A.J." DiScala when she was 19, and he became her manager. They began dating shortly before she turned 21, and married on July 11, 2003. She subsequently changed her name to Jamie-Lynn DiScala. They separated in September 2005, and she resumed using her maiden name. She then dated restaurateur Scott Sartiano from 2006 to 2008.

In 2008, Sigler visited Israel through the Birthright Israel program and was moved by the trip, calling Israel "one of the most beautiful, inspiring places [she's] ever been to". She said that the trip gave her a greater understanding of her Jewish ancestry. Also in 2008, she began a relationship with actor Jerry Ferrara, whom she met while guest-starring on Entourage as a love interest of Ferrara's character. They split up in 2009. She later dated football player Mark Sanchez.

In 2012, Sigler began dating baseball player Cutter Dykstra, the son of former Major League Baseball player Lenny Dykstra. The two became engaged on January 28, 2013, and announced in February 2013 that they were expecting their first child. Sigler gave birth to their first son on August 28, 2013. They were married in Palm Springs, California, on January 16, 2016. The couple had their second son on January 15, 2018.

== Health problems ==
In January 2016, Sigler revealed that she was diagnosed with multiple sclerosis (MS) when she was 20 years old. In 2000, while filming Campfire Stories in Hamburg, New Jersey, Sigler was paralyzed from the waist down for several days. This symptom turned out to be related to multiple sclerosis, but it was misdiagnosed as Lyme disease at the time. In December 2023, Novartis hired Sigler to star in a TV commercial for their multiple sclerosis drug Kesimpta. In January 2026, Sigler would notably show her real-life MS condition to a television audience while playing a doctor with MS during a guest appearance on Grey's Anatomy, with Sigler noting in an interview with People that the guest appearance made her "not [feel] like I have to hide anything about my physicality" and that it "allowed me to do my best work". On January 1, 2026, Sigler was shown in a video she posted on her Instagram page to now be using a mobility scooter.

== Filmography ==
=== Film ===
Year	Title	Role	Notes
1997	A Brooklyn State of Mind	Young Angie	
2001	Campfire Stories	Natalie	
2003	Death of a Dynasty	Sexy Woman No. 3	
2005	Extreme Dating	Amy Baker	
2005	Love Wrecked	Alexis Manetti	
2006	Homie Spumoni	Alli Butterman	
2006	Blinders	Alexa	Short film
2006	Dark Ride	Cathy	
2007	New York City Serenade	Lynn	
2010	Trophy Wife	Christina	Short film
2010	Beneath the Dark	Adrienne	
2012	Divorce Invitation	Dylan	
2012	I Do	Ali Federman	
2012	Jewtopia	Hannah Daniels	
2015	Anatomy of the Tide	Gina Harper	
2017	Justice	Melissa Green	
2017	Gangster Land	Lulu Rolfe	
2019	Mob Town	Josephine Barbara	
2020	The Neighbor in the Window	Karen Morgan	
2022	I'm on Fire	Gina	Short film

=== Television ===
Year	Title	Role	Notes
1999–2007	The Sopranos	Meadow Soprano	72 episodes
2004	Call Me: The Rise and Fall of Heidi Fleiss	Heidi Fleiss	Television film
2004	Will & Grace	Ro	2 episodes
2005	Newlyweds: Nick and Jessica	Jamie-Lynn DiScala	Episode: "The Orange Bowl"
2005–2007	Higglytown Heroes	Ms. Fern	3 episodes; voice role
2007	The Gathering	Maggy Rule	Miniseries
2008	How I Met Your Mother	Jillian	Episode: "Woooo!"
2008–2009	Entourage	Jamie-Lynn Sigler	13 episodes
2009	Ugly Betty	Natalie	5 episodes
2010	Backwash	Prudence	Episode: "Chapter Eight: Lake Pupik"
2011	Criminal Behavior	Brooke Kross	Television film
2011	Drop Dead Diva	Tina Howard	Episode: "Change of Heart"
2012	Last Man Standing	Gabriella	Episode: "Take Your Daughter to Work"
2012–2013	Guys with Kids	Emily	17 episodes
2014	Dads	Elsa	Episode: "Bully Gene"
2015	The Christmas Note	Gretchen Daniels	Television film
2016	CSI: Cyber	Sasha Boyd	Episode: "5 Deadly Sins"
2016	Baby Daddy	Sara Gilcrest	2 episodes
2016	The Snowy Day	Layla's Mom	TV special short
2017	Mommy, I Didn't Do It	Vera Dutton	Television film
2018	Signed, Sealed, Delivered: The Road Less Traveled	Rachel	Television film
2018	Magnum P.I.	Toni	Episode: "Bad Day to Be a Hero"
2019–2020	Elena of Avalor	Princess Rebeca	3 episodes
2020	Beef House	Detective Megan Dungerson	6 episodes
2021–2023	Big Sky	Tonya Walsh	Main role (season 3), recurring (season 2)
2026	Grey's Anatomy	Dr. Laura Kaplan	Episode: "Heavy on Me"
2026	Tires	Jamie	S03E12 "It's a good day, West Chester"
2026	Celebrity Wheel of Fortune	Herself	Contestant

=== Music videos ===
Year	Title	Artist	Role
2002	"Juliet"	LMNT	Laundromat Girl
2002	"Through the Rain"	Mariah Carey	Kirsten
2003	"Sunrise"	Simply Red	Girl
2008	"Jizz in My Pants"	The Lonely Island	Check-Out Girl

== Stage ==
Theatre credits
Year	Title	Role	Venue(s)	Refs.
2001	Rodgers & Hammerstein's Cinderella	Cinderella	US national tour	
2001	Rodgers & Hammerstein's Cinderella	Cinderella	The Theater at Madison Square Garden, New York	
2002	Beauty and the Beast	Belle	Lunt-Fontanne Theatre, Broadway	
2010	Love, Loss, and What I Wore	performer	Westside Theatre, Off-Broadway	

== Awards and nominations ==
Year	Association	Category	Project	Result	Ref.
1999	Screen Actors Guild Awards	Outstanding Ensemble in a Drama Series	The Sopranos (season 1)	Won	
2000	Screen Actors Guild Awards	Outstanding Ensemble in a Drama Series	The Sopranos (season 2)	Nominated	
2001	Screen Actors Guild Awards	Outstanding Ensemble in a Drama Series	The Sopranos (season 3)	Nominated	
2002	Screen Actors Guild Awards	Outstanding Ensemble in a Drama Series	The Sopranos (season 4)	Nominated	
2004	Screen Actors Guild Awards	Outstanding Ensemble in a Drama Series	The Sopranos (season 5)	Nominated	
2006	Screen Actors Guild Awards	Outstanding Ensemble in a Drama Series	The Sopranos (season 6 – Part 1)	Nominated	
2007	Screen Actors Guild Awards	Outstanding Ensemble in a Drama Series	The Sopranos (season 6 – Part 2)	Won	

== Discography ==
- Here to Heaven (2001)
