= A-list =

Person at the very top of their field

An A-list actor is a major movie star, or one of the most bankable actors in a film industry.

== Popular usage ==
In popular usage outside the film industry, an A-list celebrity is any person with an admired or desirable social status. Even socialites with popular press coverage and elite associations have been termed as A-list celebrities. Similarly, less popular persons and current teen idols are referred to as B-list celebrities – and the ones with lesser fame as C-list ones. In 2000, Entertainment Weekly interpreted a C-list celebrity as "that guy, or sometimes that girl, the easy-to-remember but hard-to-name character actor".

The D-list is for someone whose celebrity is so obscure that they are generally only known for appearances as celebrities on panel game shows and reality television. In the late 20th century, D-listers were largely ignored by the news industry; for example, Paul Lynde, by this point in his career best known for being on the daytime game show Hollywood Squares, went largely unnoticed by the supermarket tabloids, and his homosexuality (which would have drawn attention for bigger celebrities) went mostly unreported. Kathy Griffin, an American comedian who became widely known for her frequent appearances on such programs, used the term in a tongue-in-cheek manner for her 2005 TV special The D-List and her 2005 TV series Kathy Griffin: My Life on the D-List. The term "D-list" is derived from the lowest rating used for the Ulmer scale. Other successive letters of the alphabet beyond D, as in the terms E-list and Z-list, are sometimes used for exaggeration or comic effect but effectively have the same meaning as D-list.

== See also ==
- B movies (Hollywood Golden Age)
- Famous for being famous
- Leading actor
- Superstar
