= Henry Fellowship =

University scholarship

The Charles and Julia Henry Fellowships (known as the 'Henry Fellowships') were initiated in 1930. The fellowship funds four full-time post-graduate students every year at Harvard University, Yale University, the University of Cambridge and the University of Oxford. Two students from any British university are funded to study in the US (one at Harvard and one at Yale), and two American students from Harvard and Yale are funded to study at Cambridge and Oxford.

The Henry Fellowships are administered according to the 1927 will of Lady Julia Henry, the wife of Sir Charles Henry, an Australian-born philanthropist who became a Member of Parliament in the British House of Commons from 1906. The fellowships are awarded by the Henry Fund, a registered charity which also awards the Jane Eliza Procter Fellowship for British PhD students to study at Princeton University.

For the 2024/25 Henry Fellowships, the award covers full tuition, health insurance, £3,000 travel expenses, and a $37,500 maintenance grant (considerably higher than the comparable Holtzer Fellowship grant of $18,000).

== Trustees of the Henry Fund ==
As of September 2019, the trustees, responsible for nominating the Henry Fellows from British universities to study at Harvard and Yale, are:

Cambridge Trustees:
Professor Lord Eatwell, President of Queens' College (Chairman)
Dame Fiona Reynolds, Master of Emmanuel College
Lord Smith of Finsbury, Master of Pembroke College

Oxford Trustees:
Professor Sir David Clary, President of Magdalen College
Mr Will Hutton, Principal of Hertford College
Baroness Royall of Blaisdon, Principal of Somerville College

Harvard Trustees:
Professor Drew Gilpin Faust, President of Harvard University
Mr Marc Goodheart, Vice President and Secretary of Harvard University
Professor Rakesh Khurana, Dean of Harvard College

Yale Trustees:
Professor Peter Salovey, President of Yale University
Ms Kimberly Goff-Crews, Secretary and Vice President for Student Life
Professor Marvin Chun, Dean of Yale College

Secretariat to the Henry Fund:
Ms Bahar Abdi, Secretary

== Notable Henry Fellows ==
- M. H. Abrams, American literary critic, at the University of Cambridge.
- Sidney S. Alexander, economist at MIT, at the University of Cambridge (1936–37).
- Garrett Birkhoff, American mathematician, at the University of Cambridge (1932–33).
- Carmen Blacker, British scholar of Japan, at Harvard University (1950–51).
- Robert James Blattner, American mathematician, at the University of Cambridge (1953–54).
- Raymond Bonham Carter, British banker, at Harvard University (1952–53).
- David Brading, British historian, at Yale University.
- Wallace Brigden, British cardiologist, at Yale University (1937–38).
- Leon Brittan, former British Home Secretary and vice-president of the European Commission, at Yale University.
- Harvey Brooks, American physicist and policymaker, at the University of Cambridge (1937–38).
- Roderick Carnegie, Australian businessman and mining magnate, at Harvard University (1957–58).
- David Caute, British historian and playwright, at Harvard University.
- Val Chapman, New Zealander botanist and professor, at Harvard University (1935–36).
- Sir Derman Guy Christopherson, engineer and former Master of Magdalene College, Cambridge, at Harvard University (1937–38).
- Ray S. Cline, CIA official and chief analyst during Cuban Missile Crisis, at the University of Oxford (1939–40).
- Ronald Crossland, English classical philologist, at Yale University (1946–47).
- David Dellinger, American radical pacifist and one of the Chicago Seven, at the University of Oxford (1936–37).
- Lord Bernard Donoughue, Labour politician, journalist, academic, and businessman, at Harvard University (1958–59).
- Robert Werner Duemling, American foreign service officer and ambassador, at the University of Cambridge (1950–51).
- Colin Eisler, American art historian, at the University of Oxford.
- Sir Frank Edward Figgures, British civil servant and secretary-general of the European Free Trade Association, at Yale University (1933–34).
- Norman Foster, Baron Foster of Thames Bank, British architect, at Yale University (1961–62).
- Jesse M. Furman, United States District Judge for the Southern District of New York, at the University of Oxford (1994–95).
- Donald Hall, American poet and literary critic, at the University of Oxford (1951–52).
- Marshall Hall, American mathematician, at the University of Cambridge.
- Stephen C. Harrison, biochemist and Harvard professor, at the University of Cambridge (1963–64).
- George Haskins, American legal historian, at the University of Oxford (1935–36).
- A. Carl Helmholz, nuclear physicist and department chair, at the University of Cambridge (1936–37).
- Marni Hodgkin, children's book editor, at the University of Cambridge (1939–40).
- Bill Jenkins, Royal Marines officer and academic, at Yale University (1948–49).
- Donald Keene, American-born Japanese scholar and historian, at the University of Cambridge (1948–49).
- Andrew Kuper, South African venture capitalist, at Harvard University (1999-2000).
- Herbert R. Kohl, educator and founder of the Open School movement.
- Sir David Lane, British politician, industrialist, and barrister, at Yale University (1947–48).
- Sir Timothy Lankester, former President of Corpus Christi College, Oxford, at Yale University.
- Lynne Lawner, American poet and translator, at the University of Cambridge.
- Jack Linnett, former Vice-Chancellor of the University of Cambridge, at Harvard University.
- Bryan Magee, British philosopher, broadcaster and writer, at Yale University (1955–56).
- Charles S. Maier, American historian and Harvard professor, at the University of Oxford (1960-61).
- Stephen Marglin, American economist and Harvard professor, at the University of Cambridge (1959–60).
- Martin McLaren, former British politician, at Harvard University.
- Gary Saul Morson, American literary critic and professor, at the University of Oxford.
- Jacob Neusner, scholar of Judaism, at the University of Oxford (1953–54).
- David Nicholls (theologian), political scientist and priest (1960-61).
- John Oaksey, British jockey and horse racing patron, at Yale University (1952–53).
- Anthony Oettinger, linguist and computer scientist at Harvard, at the University of Cambridge (1951–52).
- Sarah Parcak, American archeologist and professor at the University of Alabama, at the University of Cambridge (2001-02).
- J. H. Parry, maritime historian, at Harvard University (1936–37).
- Charles Parsons, philosopher and professor at Harvard, at the University of Cambridge (1954–55).
- J.R.A. Pearson, fluid dynamicist, scientific consultant, and chair of Pearson, at Harvard University (1953–54).
- David Price, British politician and industrial economist, at Yale University (1948–49).
- Earl Ravenal, American foreign policy analyst, at the University of Cambridge (1952–53).
- Hartley Rogers Jr., mathematician and administrator at MIT, at the University of Cambridge (1946–47).
- Eugene V. Rostow, American legal scholar and politician, at the University of Cambridge.
- Stephen Sackur, British journalist, at Harvard University (1985–86).
- Bernard Sendall, British civil servant and author, at Harvard University (1934–35).
- Charles Saumarez Smith, historian and CEO of the Royal Academy of Arts, at Harvard University (1976–77).
- Arthur M. Schlesinger Jr., American public intellectual, at the University of Cambridge (1938–39).
- Lyman Spitzer, theoretical physicist and astronomer, at the University of Cambridge (1935–36).
- Jan Steckel, American writer and queer activist, at the University of Oxford (1983–84).
- Potter Stewart, lawyer and U.S. Supreme Court justice, at the University of Cambridge (1937–38).
- James Haward Taylor, British geologist, at Harvard University (1933–34).
- Robert Thom, screenwriter, at the University of Cambridge (1951–52).
- Charles Tilly, sociologist and political scientist, at the University of Oxford (1950–51).
- Sir Michael Tugendhat, High Court judge in England and Wales, at Yale University.
- Peter Viereck, poet and history professor, at the University of Oxford (1937–38).
- William Wade (legal scholar), British legal scholar, at Harvard University (1939–40).
- John Watkins, British philosopher and professor at the London School of Economics, at Yale University (1949–50).
- Neal S. Wolin, former U.S. politician and businessman, at the University of Oxford.
- Erik Olin Wright, American sociologist, at the University of Oxford (1968–69).

== See also ==
- Rhodes Scholarship
- Marshall Scholarship
- Mitchell Scholarship
- Harkness Fellowship
- Kennedy Scholarship
- Jane Eliza Procter Fellowship
