= Jane Eliza Procter Fellowship =

Princeton University scholarship program

Jane Eliza Procter Fellowships are scholarships supporting academic research at Princeton University. The Fellowships were endowed by William Cooper Procter in 1921–22, and named after his wife, Jane Eliza Johnston Procter (1864–1953). The original terms of the Fellowships were for three awards, "each with an annual stipend of two thousand dollars, upon which each year two British and one French scholar will have the privilege of residence in the Princeton Graduate College, and of pursuing advanced study and investigation". The Fellowships were to be appointed annually on the recommendation of the University of Oxford, the University of Cambridge, and the École Normale Supérieure.

The Fellowships are now for four visiting students per year, consisting of full tuition and stipend, for "young British and French scholars, one upon recommendation by the University of Cambridge, England; one upon recommendation by the University of Oxford, England; and two upon recommendation made by the École Normale Supérieure". The fellowship funds can be used to support non-degree visiting pre-doctoral or doctoral scholars for one year.

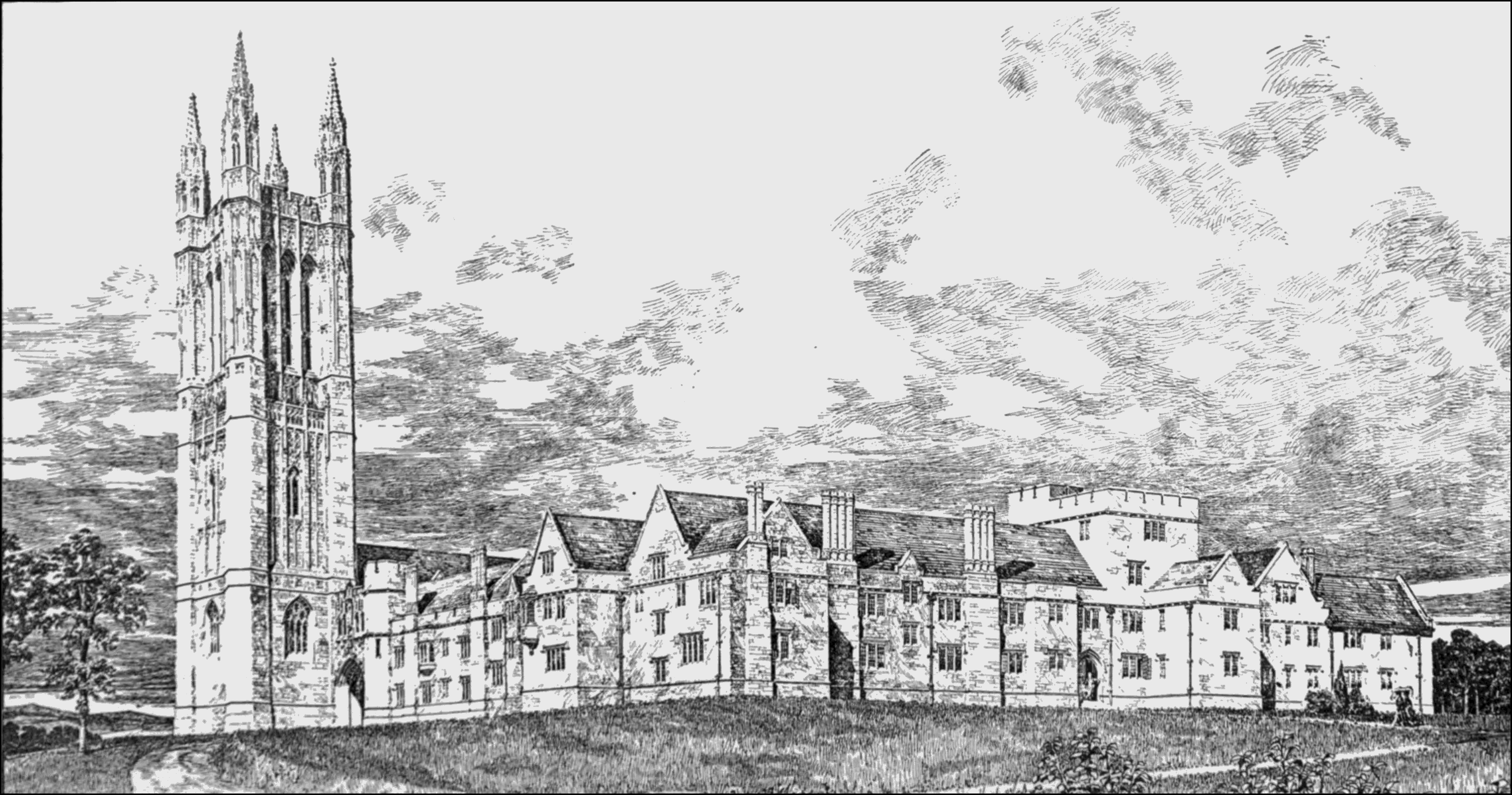
Graduate College, Princeton University

== Administration and trustees ==
In the United Kingdom, the Fellowships are administered by the "English Trustees" of the Henry Fund, a similar scholarship for study at Harvard and Yale, the Henry Fellowship. The Trustees are currently (September 2019):

Cambridge Trustees:
Professor Lord Eatwell, President of Queens' College (Chairman)
Dame Fiona Reynolds, Master of Emmanuel College
Lord Smith of Finsbury, Master of Pembroke College

Oxford Trustees:
Professor Sir David Clary, President of Magdalen College
Mr Will Hutton, Principal of Hertford College
Baroness Royall of Blaisdon, Principal of Somerville College

Harvard Trustees:
Professor Drew Gilpin Faust, President of Harvard University
Mr Marc Goodheart, Vice President and Secretary of Harvard University
Professor Rakesh Khurana, Dean of Harvard College

Yale Trustees:
Professor Peter Salovey, President of Yale University
Ms Kimberly Goff-Crews, Secretary and Vice President for Student Life
Professor Marvin Chun, Dean of Yale College

Secretariat:
Ms Bahar Abdi, Secretary

Former Trustees include:

- Jennifer Barnes, former President of Murray Edwards College, Cambridge.
- Professor Richard Carwardine, former President of Corpus Christi College, Oxford.
- Sir Richard Dearlove, former Master of Pembroke College, Cambridge.
- Professor Margaret MacMillan, former Warden of St Antony's College, Oxford.

== Alan Turing ==
Alan Turing received a Procter Fellowship in 1937–38, on the recommendation of John von Neumann, among others. Turing commenced Systems of Logic Based on Ordinals during his Procter Fellowship year.

== Notable recipients ==
- Al Alvarez, poet.
- Gerald Aylmer, historian.
- Robert Bartlett, historian.
- Geoffrey Bing, British Labour politician.
- Sir Herbert Butterfield, historian.
- Sir David Butler, psephologist.
- David Cairns, journalist.
- Sir David Cannadine, historian.
- Claude Chabauty, mathematician.
- Gustave Choquet, mathematician.
- Fokko du Cloux, mathematician.
- Michael Hewson Crawford, historian.
- Thibault Damour, physicist.
- Jean Dieudonné, mathematician.
- Charles Ehresmann, mathematician.
- Alfred Lucien Foulet, historian.
- Lindley Fraser, economist.
- Jean Ginibre, physicist.
- Eric Griffiths, literary critic.
- Andrew Dunnet Hook, Professor of English, University of Glasgow.
- Robert G. Hoyland, historian.
- David Malcolm Lewis, classicist.
- John Lucas, philosopher.
- Sir Oliver Letwin, British conservative politician.
- Colin Leys, political economist.
- Edward Linfoot, mathematician.
- Béatrice Longuenesse, philosopher.
- Raymond Lyttleton, mathematician.
- Donald Markwell, social scientist.
- R. B. McCallum, Master of Pembroke College, Oxford.
- Harold Scott MacDonald Coxeter, geometer.
- Timothy Morton, philosopher.
- André Neveu, physicist.
- J. R. Pole, historian.
- F. T. Prince, poet.
- James Smith, literary critic.
- Arthur Harold Stone, mathematician.
- Elaine Treharne, Professor of English, Stanford University.
- Alan Turing, computer scientist, mathematician.
- Francis Noble Ratcliffe, zoologist.
- Kallistos Ware, Bishop and theologian.
- René Wellek, literary critic.
- David Wiggins, philosopher.
- John Hulton Wolfenden, Professor of Chemistry, Dartmouth College.
- Shaun Wylie, mathematician.

== See also ==
- Harkness Fellowship
- Henry Fellowship
- Kellett Fellowship
- Kennedy Scholarship
- Marshall Scholarship
