= Mudigonda (disambiguation) =

Mudigonda is a town and revenue-divisional headquarters in Khammam District of Andhra Pradesh, India.

Mudigonda may also refer to:

- Gayathri Mudigonda (born 1983), Indian–Swedish actress
- Mudigonda Lingamurthy (1908–1980), Indian actor
