= Green Card Fever =

- Directed by: Bala Rajasekharuni
- Written by: Bala Rajasekharuni
- Produced by: Bala Rajasekharuni; Mark Oliver Rylance
- Starring: Vikram Dasu; Purva Bedi
- Cinematography: Joe M. Johnston; Scott Spears
- Edited by: Robert Komatsu
- Music by: Pete Sears
- Release date: 2003
- Country: United States
- Language: English

Green Card Fever is a 2003 Indian-American independent film written and directed by Bala Rajasekharuni. The film starred Deep Katdare and Purva Bedi. The film was distributed by Net Effect Media and released worldwide following a series of film festival runs. The film was entirely shot in Columbus, Ohio. The film was screened at the Reelworld Film Festival. The film was nominated for "Best Political Film of 2003" in the "Exposé" category by the Political Film Society.

== Plot ==
The film depicts the trials and tribulations associated with obtaining a green card in the United States, exploring the secret underworld surrounding the immigration system and the legal complexities that await undocumented immigrants. Green Card Fever explores the dynamics between immigrants from various countries of origin and generations. Primarily, the plot centers around Indian immigrants but involves Argentinians, Chinese, and Middle Eastern immigrants along the way, depicting the present United States as a transnational America. The film is dubbed as a romantic comedy, but in substance it has more to offer.

== Cast ==
- Vikram Dasu as Murali
- Purva Bedi as Bharathi
- Nick Baldasare as Patrick
- Deep Katdare as Omjeet Singh Purewal
- Robert Lin as Chan
- Subash Kundanmal as Dada
- Kaizaad Kotwal as Parvesh

== Production ==
Los Angeles-based Bala Rajasekharuni made his directorial debut through this film; he previously assisted Nagesh Kukunoor. Vikram Dasu, previously starred in several stage drama, television shows and films, made his lead feature film debut. Rajasekharuni based this film on his experiences visiting several parts of America including the corrupt immigration system and the racial bias present in the country.

== Reception ==
Scott Foundas of Variety wrote, "Not unlike a 'Coming to America' or 'Moscow on the Hudson' -- minus the laughs and endearing characters -- pic seems unlikely to meet with crossover success". Subhash K. Jha wrote, "Though the narrative takes simplistic swipes at the immigrant's plight, 'Green Card Fever' has enough glimmers of sunrays falling on its potentially far-reaching canvas to keep us interested in the occasionally-strained, often-ruthless saga of the rootless".
