= LeapFrog Investments =

American private investment firm

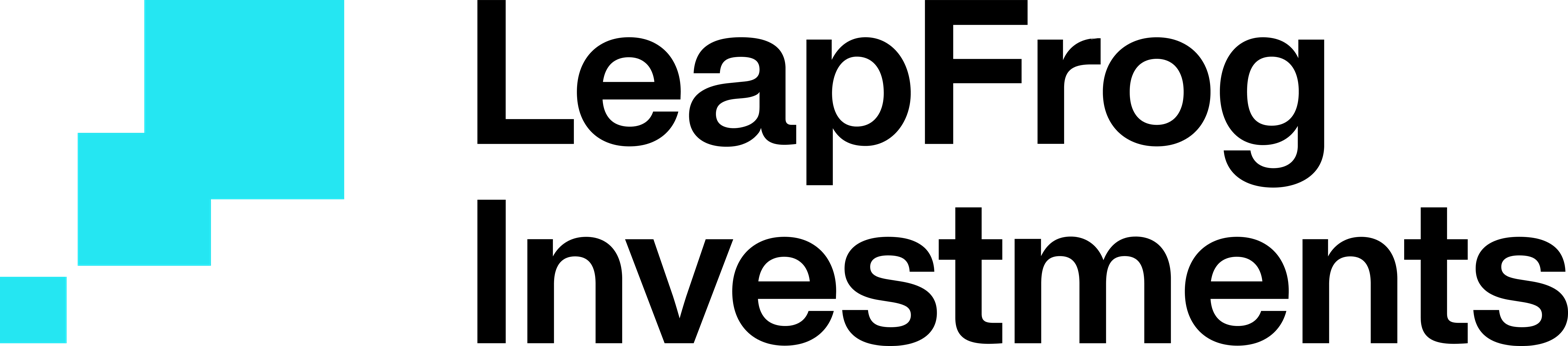
- LeapFrog Investments logo
- Type: Private company
- Industry: Private equity, financial services, alternative investments
- Founded: 2007; 19 years ago
- Founders: Andrew Kuper (Founder and CEO), Gary Herbert (Co-Founder)
- Areas served: Southeast Asia, South Asia, Africa
- Services: Investments, Healthcare, Financial Services, Climate Solutions
- Website: www.leapfroginvest.com

LeapFrog Investments is a private equity firm that invests in financial services, healthcare and climate-related companies in emerging markets in Africa and Asia.

As of 2025, LeapFrog had raised more than US$2.8 billion in capital from investors. The firm's investments have grown at more than 22% annually over the life of the firm and its companies reach approximately 559 million consumers, primarily in Africa and Asia.

LeapFrog was ranked by Fortune as one of the top five Companies to Change the World in 2017, the first private investment firm ever listed and made the list for a second time in 2023. In 2023, LeapFrog won the Private Equity International (PEI) Firm of the Year Africa award.

== History ==
=== Foundation ===
LeapFrog was founded in South Africa in January 2007 by Andrew Kuper and officially launched in 2008 alongside former US President Bill Clinton, who endorsed the firm for opening new frontiers for alternative investments.

According to The Economist, LeapFrog is a well-established impact investing firm. LeapFrog has attracted over $2.8 billion from global investors, including Temasek, Prudential Financial, AIA, Swiss Re, JP Morgan, TIAA-CREF and eBay founder Pierre Omidyar's Omidyar Network.

=== Funds & Strategy growth ===
LeapFrog owns significant stakes in companies across Ghana, Kenya, Nigeria, South Africa, Thailand, Indonesia, Sri Lanka and India, among others.

It raised its first fund of $135 million in 2009 to invest in insurance and related financial services companies. In September 2013, LeapFrog Investments launched its second fund, raising US$204 million initially, and in 2014 it announced the fund was oversubscribed at US$400 million. Overseas Private Investment Corporation (OPIC), the U.S. government's development finance institution, committed to invest up to US$200 million in December 2015, the largest investment commitment historically by OPIC to any impact fund manager. In January 2016, Prudential Financial invested US$350 million with the firm.

In 2019, LeapFrog raised US$700 million for its flagship emerging markets fund. It used the funds to invest in companies including WorldRemit (now Zepz), HDBank and HealthifyMe. The fund launched with 40 institutional investors including Prudential Financial, OPIC and International Finance Corporation (IFC).

In March 2021, Temasek Holdings, an investment company headquartered in Singapore, entered into a US$500 million strategic partnership with LeapFrog. As part of the agreement, Temasek received a minority stake in LeapFrog and took a seat on its board of directors. The multi-fund investment by Temasek anchors LeapFrog's future funds and provides growth capital to support the expansion of the LeapFrog team and investment capabilities across Asia and Africa.

In 2022, at COP27 in Egypt, LeapFrog launched its Climate Investment Strategy, marking a natural extension of the firm's 15-year journey as a pioneer of impact investing. The strategy states it will support companies and technologies that enable both mitigation of and adaptation to climate change by lower-income people.

Hong Kong insurer AIA allocated $200m to LeapFrog funds in 2023, described by the Financial Times as one of the largest investments into portfolios trying to meet social or environment targets such as those in the UN's Sustainable Development Goals.

LeapFrog has offices in Mauritius, Singapore, South Africa, Australia, Nairobi, Lagos and the United Kingdom. In 2017, Fortune ranked LeapFrog Investments as one of the top 5 Companies to Change the World, alongside Apple and Novartis.

== Impact Measurement & Management ==
LeapFrog consulted on the creation of the Operating Principles for Impact Management in Partnership with the IFC and World Bank in 2018. The nine principles were created to set a basic market standard for impact investing and serve as a guide to deployment of capital by institutional investors. In 2019, LeapFrog became the first impact investor globally to announce the results of an independent audit of its impact against the Operating Principles for Impact Management. LeapFrog was deemed an "exemplification of industry best practice" with its impact measurement and management systems assessed as reaching "an advanced level of alignment across the board for all nine of the Principles". In 2023, it was again recognised as an industry leader, achieving the highest rating of Advanced across each of the principles, as assessed by independent auditor BlueMark.

== Leadership ==
In 2018, LeapFrog formed its Global Leadership Council. Members include Julia Gillard AC, former Prime Minister of Australia; Carole Wainaina, former COO of Africa50; Simon Israel, former Chairman of Singtel; Jaime Augusto Zobel de Ayala, chairman and CEO of Ayala Corporation; Bharat Doshi, former Director of the Reserve Bank of India; David Gonski, former Chairman of ANZ Banking Group; Steve Howard, Vice Chairman of Sustainability at Temasek; and Roger Ferguson, former president and CEO of TIAA and former Vice Chair of the US Federal Reserve.

In 2022, former McKinsey global managing partner Dominic Barton joined as LeapFrog chairman.

== See also ==
- Impact investing
- Private equity
- Emerging markets
- Blue Haven Initiative
