= Deep Katdare =

American actor

- Born: July 4, 1970 (age 55); Buffalo, New York, U.S.
- Education: Massachusetts Institute of Technology (BS)
- Occupations: executive, former actor
- Years active: 1996–2013
- Known for: American Desi
- Spouse: Reshma Shetty (2011–present)
- Children: 1

Deep Katdare (born July 4, 1970) is an American executive and former actor. He starred in and produced the movie American Desi (2001) and was in the cast of Hiding Divya (2006), on which he was an executive producer. He also appeared in several episodes of Law & Order: SVU. From 2004 to 2006, Katdare appeared in the Broadway production Bombay Dreams as Vikram, the show's villain. He currently works at The Related Companies as a Senior Vice President.

== Early life and career ==
Katdare was born in Buffalo, New York into a Marathi family. He grew up Chatham Township and was educated at the Delbarton School. He graduated from Massachusetts Institute of Technology (MIT) with a Bachelor of Science degree in political science in 1992. Katdare was an associate at BNP Paribas from 1995 to 2002. He then worked as director at Centerline Capital Group from 2007 to 2014. After that he worked for a year at Red Stone Equity Partners, LLC as Senior Vice President. As of 2015, he works at The Related Companies as a Senior Vice President.

Katdare first role was in 1996 and he appeared on New York Undercover. In 2001 he made his film debut in American Desi as the lead role and was also the producer. He then appeared on Bombay Dreams in 2002. In 2003 he appeared in a villain role in Green Card Fever. In 2004 he appeared on Indian Cowboy and The Cookout. In 2005 he made appearances on Law & Order: Trial by Jury, CSI: Miami, and Over There. In 2006 he had another leading role in Hiding Divya where he was also executive producer. In 2007 he appeared on Americanizing Shelley and Law & Order: SVU. In 2008 he made his final film in Blind Ambition. In 2013 he filmed his last role on Golden Boy.

== Personal life ==
Katdare resides in New York City. He is married to Royal Pains actress Reshma Shetty, who starred with him in the national tour of Bombay Dreams in 2006. They married on March 19, 2011, and welcomed daughter Ariya Eliana on October 6, 2015.

== Filmography ==
=== Film ===
Year	Title	Role	Notes
2001	American Desi	Krishna "Kris" Gopal Reddy	Also producer
2002	Bombay Dreams	Vikram	
2003	Green Card Fever	Omjeet Singh Purewal	
2004	Indian Cowboy	Guru	
2004	The Cookout	Clerk	
2006	Hiding Divya	Ravi Das	Also executive producer
2007	Americanizing Shelley	Nick	
2008	Blind Ambition	Surya Shah	

=== Television ===
Year	Title	Role	Notes
1996	New York Undercover	Matossian	Episode: "Going Platinum"
2005	Law & Order: Trial by Jury	Dr. Philip Brem	Episode: "Blue Wall"
2005	CSI: Miami	Nassar	Episode: "10-7"
2005	Over There	Doctor	2 episodes
2007–2008	Law & Order: SVU	Dr. Parnell	5 episodes
2013	Golden Boy	Ballistics Tech	Episode: "McKenzie on Fire"
