= American Desi =

2001 film by Piyush Dinker Pandya

- DVD cover
- Directed by: Piyush Dinker Pandya
- Written by: Piyush Dinker Pandya
- Produced by: Deep Katdare; Cyrus E. Koewing; Gitesh Pandya; Piyush Dinker Pandya
- Starring: Deep Katdare; Purva Bedi
- Release dates: 16 March 2001 (USA); 27 September 2002 (India)
- Running time: 100 minutes
- Countries: United States; India
- Languages: English; Hindi
- Budget: $250,000
- Box office: $1.1 million

American Desi is a 2001 Indian-American comedy film. It is notable for featuring many prominent South Asian American actors and features an a cappella version by Penn Masala of Nazia Hassan's classic "Aap Jaisa Koi", originally from the Indian film Qurbani. The term Desi in the title refers to the people and cultures of the Indian subcontinent.

== Plot ==
An American son of Indian immigrants, Krishnagopal Reddy, or "Kris" as he prefers to be called (to distance himself from his heritage), does not associate with the Indian culture that his parents have pushed upon him. Upon arriving at Rutgers University, he finds out to his dismay that all of his roommates are of Indian descent, and all except one are international students from India. His roommates include Ajay (Kal Penn), who idealizes African-American culture; Jagjit, who loves art but studies engineering to please his father; and Salim (Rizwan Manji), who is very traditional and conservative, feeling that Indian-American girls are too Westernized to make good wives.

Kris meets Nina, a girl he immediately falls for, and is surprised to find out that not only is she of Indian descent, but she is also quite connected to Indian culture and speaks her parents' native language. Kris tries his best to win Nina over - from joining the Indian Students Association to be near her, to learning how to perform a Dandiya Raas. Kris eventually begins to enjoy the company of his roommates, all of whom put together their knowledge and skill to help Kris impress Nina through various ways involving Indian culture, which he eventually comes to appreciate.

== Cast ==
- Deep Katdare as Krishnagopal "Kris" Reddy
- Purva Bedi as Nina Shah
- Ronobir Lahiri as Jagjit Singh
- Rizwan Manji as Salim Ali Khan
- Kal Penn as Ajay Pandya
- Anil Kumar as Rakesh Patel
- Sunita Param as Farah Saeed
- Aladdin Ullah as Gautam Rao
- Eric Axen as Eric Berger
- Sanjit De Silva as Chandu
- Sunil Malhotra as Hemant
- Ami Shukla as Priya
- Krishen Mehta as Mr. Reddy
- Smita Patel as Mrs. Reddy
- Bina Sharif as Mrs. Saeed
- Tirlok Malik as Mr. Saeed
- Ravi Khanna as Mr. Singh

== Soundtrack ==
=== Track listing ===
No.	Title	Lyrics	Music	Singer(s)	Length
1.	"Aap Jaisa Koi"	Indeevar	Penn Masala	Penn Masala	4.06

== Reception ==
On Metacritic, the film has a score of 50% based on reviews from 7 critics, indicating "mixed or average" reviews.

== See also ==
- Chutney Popcorn
