= Ronald Crossland =

English classical scholar

- Born: 31 August 1920; Nottingham, England
- Died: 29 January 2006 (aged 85); Cambridge, England

Academic background
- Education: King's College, Cambridge; Yale University

Academic work
- Discipline: Classics
- Institutions: University of Sheffield

Ronald Arthur Crossland (31 August 1920 – 29 January 2006) was an English classical scholar who was Professor of Greek at Sheffield University from 1958 to 1982. He was a leading expert on Hittite philology and linguistics.

== Biography ==
Ronald Arthur Crossland was born in Nottingham, England on 31 August 1920. His father was a Nottingham headmaster. A graduate of Nottingham High School, Crossland went up as a Major Scholar in Classics at King's College, Cambridge, in 1939. In 1941 Crossland joined the British Army. He saw active service until the end of World War II, rising to the rank of lieutenant in the Royal Artillery. He was severely wounded during the landings at the Battle of Anzio.

In 1946, Crossland earned a Double First in Classics at King's College, Cambridge. He became a Henry Fellow at Berkeley College, Yale University in 1946. Gaining an MA, Crossland was instructor in classics at Yale University from 1947 to 1948.

On account of his research on Hittite philology and linguistics, Crossland was from 1948 to 1951 a Senior Student at the Treasury Committee for Studentships in Foreign Languages and Cultures. From 1950 to 1951, Crossland was Honorary Lecturer in Ancient History at the University of Birmingham. From 1951 to 1958, he was lecturer in Ancient History at King's College, Durham. From 1952 to 1956 he was simultaneously a Harris Fellow at King's College, Cambridge. During this time, Crossland held visiting appointments at the universities of Birmingham, Texas, Michigan and Auckland, and at the German Academy of Sciences at Berlin.

From 1958 to 1982, Crossland was Professor of Greek at the University of Sheffield. His appointment at the University of Sheffield was strongly recommended by T. B. L. Webster, who was eager to ensure that a talented young Hellenist would fill the position of Jonathan Tate. He was Dean of the Faculty of Arts from 1973 to 1975.

Crossland was renowned as an expert on Hittite philology and linguistics, and for his efforts to encourage interdisciplinary research on the history of the Bronze Age Near East. Crossland retired from Sheffield University as Professor Emeritus in 1982. He died in Cambridge, England on 29 January 2006.

== Selected works ==
- Bronze Age migrations in the Aegean, 1970
