= Robert Werner Duemling =

American diplomat

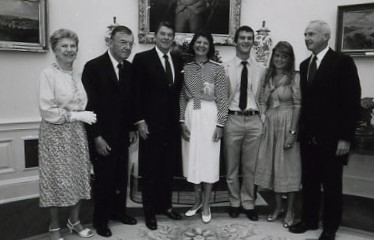
Robert Werner Duemling and Ronald Reagan 1982

Robert Werner Duemling (February 29, 1929 - July 13, 2012) was an American diplomat who served as Ambassador Extraordinary and Plenipotentiary to Suriname (1982–1984).

== Biography ==
Duemling grew up in Fort Wayne, Indiana and San Diego, California. He graduated from San Diego High School before continuing on to earn bachelor's and master's degrees in Art and Architecture from Yale University and a Henry Fellowship to study at Cambridge University in England. Before joining the Foreign Service in 1957, he served as a naval officer during the Korean War. He retired in 1987 to accept the position of President and Director of the National Building Museum in Washington, D.C. He was married to Louisa C. Duemling, a member of the du Pont family.

During his tenure as US Ambassador to Suriname, he was ostensibly involved in abortive efforts to sponsor the ouster of Dési Bouterse by a militant force of Surinamese dissidents in coordination with the Director of Central Intelligence, William J. Casey, which were opposed by both the United States House Intelligence Committee and the United States Senate Intelligence Committee, and led to the expulsion of two diplomats serving in the US Embassy in Paramaribo, Edward Donovan and Richard LaRoche. However, Duemling and other US officials would later acquiesce to Bouterse's governance once the Surinamese military leader shifted his diplomatic alignment away from Cuba toward Brazil and the United States.
