= Ekwa Msangi =

- Born: Oakland
- Citizenship: Tanzania
- Occupation(s): Filmmaker, Screenwriter, Film director

Ekwa Msangi is a Tanzanian-American filmmaker, producer, and screenwriter. She teaches Production and Cultural Studies at New York University.

== Early life ==
Msangi was born to immigrants in Oakland, California. Her parents were Fulbright scholars who attended Stanford University in the 1980s. She was raised in Kenya after her family moved there when she was five years old.

In 1998, Msangi was accepted into the NYU Tisch School of the Arts where she earned a Bachelor of Fine Arts in film and television. Initially discouraged and confused, her trajectory changed after she took a course given by African film historian Manthia Diawara. She earned an MA in African cinema from Gallatin School of Individualized Study at the same university.

== Career ==
She launched her career in producing, then went on to make award-winning short films such as comedy Soko Sonko (The Market King) and television series for Kenyan broadcasters. Her films have been official selections at several world festivals including New York African and Durban International. She is best known for her feature film Farewell Amor, which premiered at the 2020 Sundance Film Festival and received critical acclaim.

== Selected works ==
- 2009: Block-D
- 2011: Taharuki (short)
- 2016: Soko Sonko (short)
- 2016: Farewell Meu Amor (short)
- 2020: Farewell Amor
