= Holtzer Fellowship =

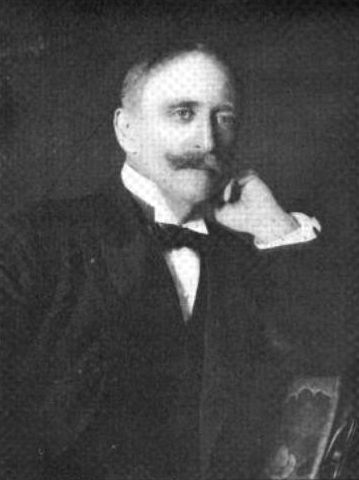
Charles W. Holtzer

The Charles W. Holtzer Fellowship (known as the 'Holtzer Fellowship') funds one German student every year at Harvard University. Established in 1929, it is one of the oldest scholarships in the world and among the highest-paying scholarships in Germany.

The Holtzer Fellowships are administered according to the will of German-American businessman and philanthropist Charles W. Holtzer. The fellowships are awarded each year by Harvard University upon recommendation of the German Academic Exchange Service.

For the 2023/24 Holtzer Fellowships, the award covers full tuition, health insurance, €1,500 travel expenses, and a €18,000 maintenance grant (slightly lower than the comparable Kennedy Scholarship maximum means-tested grant of $27,250).

== History ==
Charles William Holtzer was born in Karlsruhe, Germany on August 26, 1848. Having emigrated to the United States at the age of 20, Holtzer started an electronics business at Harvard Square, eventually founding the Holtzer-Cabot Electric Co..

The Holtzer Fellowships were initiated in 1929 upon Holtzer's death with an initial endowment of $75,000. In the wake of World War I, Holtzer desired to facilitate academic exchange between the U.S. and continental Europe. Upon initiation of the fellowship, the Harvard Crimson noted that "one foreign scholarship which brings a specially qualified student to this country to study can accomplish more than any number of meetings of peace societies in which outlawry of war is discussed".

Having been established in 1929, the Holtzer Fellowship is the oldest still active international scholarship which exclusively sends its scholars to Harvard. It is predated only by a number of national scholarships, as well as the two great international scholarships at the time of its initiation, the Rhodes Scholarship to the University of Oxford from 1902, and the Commonwealth Fund to the U.S. from 1918. The Holtzer Fellowship predates all comparable, international scholarships to Harvard; the Henry Fellowship from 1930, the Knox Fellowship from 1945, as well as the Kennedy Scholarship from 1964.

== Notable Holtzer Fellows ==
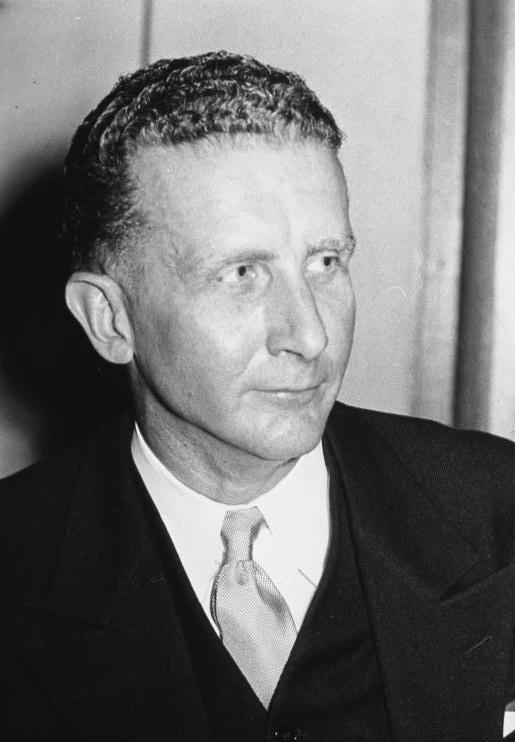
Hans Georg Rupp, former Holtzer Fellow

- H. W. Janson, German-American art historian
- Hans G. Rupp, German lawyer and judge at Federal Constitutional Court
- Wolgang Stolper, Austrian-American economist, co-author of the Stolper-Samuelson theorem
- Horst K. von Einsiedel, German anti-Nazi resistance fighter and member of the Kreisau Circle
- Hermann J. Schnitzler, German art historian
- Fritz Ermath, German lawyer, political scientist and anti-Nazi intellectual
- Hans-Lukas Teuber, German-American psychologist; founder of modern neuropsychology
- Jost Hermand, German-American literature professor
- Kaspar Naegele, German sociologist
- Klaus Scherer, Swiss social psychologist
- Herbert Bloch, German classics professor at Harvard
