= Purva Bedi =

American actress

- Born: 1973 or 1974 (age 51–52); Chandigarh, India
- Spouse: David Andrew Stoler
- Children: 1
- Mother: Susham Bedi

Purva Bedi is an Indian-born American actress. She has appeared in many television serials and several films, including Green Card Fever, American Desi, and Cosmopolitan. She has also starred in an episode of House. Her most recent appearance is as Clare on the TV teen drama Gossip Girl. In 2020, she appeared in the drama film, The Surrogate.

She was born in Chandigarh but grew up in Belgium and the United States. She is the daughter of Columbia University professor Susham Bedi.

== Filmography ==
=== Film ===
Year	Title	Role	Notes
1998	Don't Explain	Bride	
2001	American Desi	Nina Shah	
2001	Wings of Hope	Reena Khanna	
2002	The Emperor's Club	Anna Mehta	
2003	Green Card Fever	Bharathi	
2004	Ball & Chain	Ruby	
2009	Love N' Dancing	Ritu	
2011	The Adjustment Bureau	Daughter in restaurant	Uncredited
2011	Kumaré	Dancer	
2013	Once Upon a Time in Brooklyn	Nurse	
2014	A Walk Among the Tombstones	Neighbor	
2016	Equity	Channing Trust Attorney	
2016	Sully	Gursimran	
2019	The Assistant	Executive Assistant	
2020	The Surrogate	Diana	
2020	Minor Premise	Maggie	
2021	Americanish	Simi	
2021	Queen of Glory	Prof. Sangita Goel	
2021	Homebody	Priya	
2021	Gabriel's Rapture	Tara Chakravartty	
2022	Gabriel's Rapture: Part Two	Tara Chakravartty	
TBA	Rare Objects	Jasmine	

=== Television ===
Year	Title	Role	Notes
1999-2001	Agent Aika	Rion (voice)	7 episodes (English Dub)
2000	ER	Priya Shilandra	Episode: "Homecoming"
2000	The West Wing	Kaytha Trask	Episode: "Noël"
2002	Strong Medicine	Yasmin Fayed	Episode: "The Philadelphia Chromosome"
2003	Fastlane	Woman with Purse	Episode: "Monster"
2003	Cosmopolitan	Geetu	Television film
2004	The Drew Carey Show	Padma	Episode: "Love, Sri Lankan Style"
2005	Alias	Fiancée	Episode: "Solo"
2006	Law & Order: Criminal Intent	Dr. Richland	Episode: "Slither"
2006	House	Teacher	Episode: "All In"
2006	Boston Legal	Translator	Episode: "Squid Pro Quo"
2008	Cashmere Mafia	Juliet's Assistant	3 episodes
2008	Gossip Girl	Clare	2 episodes
2009	Law & Order	Dr. Dasgupta	Episode: "Exchange"
2009	DeSiCiTi	Sara Dhillon	Television film
2011	A Gifted Man	Mrs. Patel	Episode: "In Case of Separation Anxiety"
2013	The Good Wife	Sonia Patel	Episode: "Invitation to an Inquest"
2013	Mother's Day	Head Teacher	Television film
2014	Unforgettable	Rupa Nair	Episode: "Manhunt"
2015	Nurse Jackie	Tazim	Episode: "Vigilante Jones"
2015	Law & Order: SVU	Sarita Charma	Episode: "Devil's Dissections"
2016	Person of Interest	Maggie	Episode: "A More Perfect Union"
2017, 2018	Madam Secretary	Ms. Alvarez	2 episodes
2019	High Maintenance	Therapist	Episode: "Fingerbutt"
2019	The Code	Captain Maureen Reilly	Episode: "Above the Knee"
2019	She's Gotta Have It	Preeta Shankar	2 episodes
2019	Billions	Kiran Gupta	Episode: "Lamster"
2021	One of Us Is Lying	Principal Gupta	Recurring role
