= Reshma Shetty =

British actress

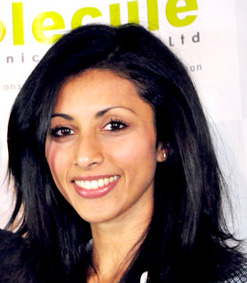
- Born: 2 November 1977 (age 48); Manchester, England
- Education: James Madison University (BM); University of Kentucky (MM); University of Cincinnati (GrDip)
- Occupation: Actress
- Years active: 2005–present
- Known for: Royal Pains
- Spouse: Deep Katdare (m. 2011)
- Children: 1

Reshma Shetty (born 2 November 1977) is a British-born American actress who is best known for her role as Divya Katdare on the USA Network TV series Royal Pains.

== Early life ==
Shetty was born on 2 November 1977 to Indian parents in Manchester and moved to Richmond, Virginia at the age of 15. She originally studied pre-med at James Madison University, but success in vocal competitions prompted her to switch majors and graduate with a BM in opera performance. Shetty received her Master of Music in performance from the University of Kentucky before moving on to the Cincinnati Conservatory of Music, where she earned her artist diploma in opera in 2005.

== Career ==
Shetty was cast as Priya, the female lead in the national tour of the Broadway musical Bombay Dreams in 2006. She also acted in the Off-Broadway play Rafta Rafta. She was a cast member on the American TV program Royal Pains portraying physician assistant Divya Katdare.

Shetty was also an occasional guest-panelist on the Fox News Channel satire show Red Eye w/Greg Gutfeld. She starred as Queen Angella in the Netflix reboot She-Ra and the Princesses of Power. She is also the face of Dove moisturizer bar in India.

== Personal life ==
Shetty currently resides in New York City. She is married to actor and financer Deep Katdare, who starred with her in Bombay Dreams. They married on March 19, 2011. She gave birth to their daughter Ariya Eliana on October 6, 2015.

== Filmography ==
Year	Title	Role	Notes
2007	Steam	Niala	
2007	30 Rock	Party Attendant	Episode: "Secrets and Lies"
2009–2016	Royal Pains	Divya Katdare	Main cast, 104 episodes.
2011	The Wendy Williams Show	Herself	
2011	Fashion in Television	Herself	
2012	Delivering the Goods	Sarah	
2012	Hated	Arianna	
2012	Allegiance	Leela	
2012	CSI Miami	Jane Caldicott	Season 10, Episode 15
2015	Odd Mom Out	Rima	Episodes: "Dying to Get In", "Omakase" & "The Truth Fairy"
2016–2017	Pure Genius	Dr. Talaikha Channarayapatra	Main cast
2017–2019	OK K.O.! Let's Be Heroes	Elodie (voice)	Supporting cast
2017–2018, 2020	Blindspot	Megan Butani	
2018–2019	She-Ra and the Princesses of Power	Queen Angella (voice)	(Main cast, Seasons 1–3; Guest, Season 4)
2019	Madam Secretary	Dr. Nimmi Bahri	Season 5, Episode 17
2019	Instinct	Maya Bhdauri	Season 2, episodes 7, 8 and 10
2022	Jolly Good Christmas	Anji Patel	Television film
2025	DMV	Kshitija	Guest star, Episodes 1 & 20
TBA	Astrological	Avi	Post-production
