= Tushar Vashisht =

Indian entrepreneur

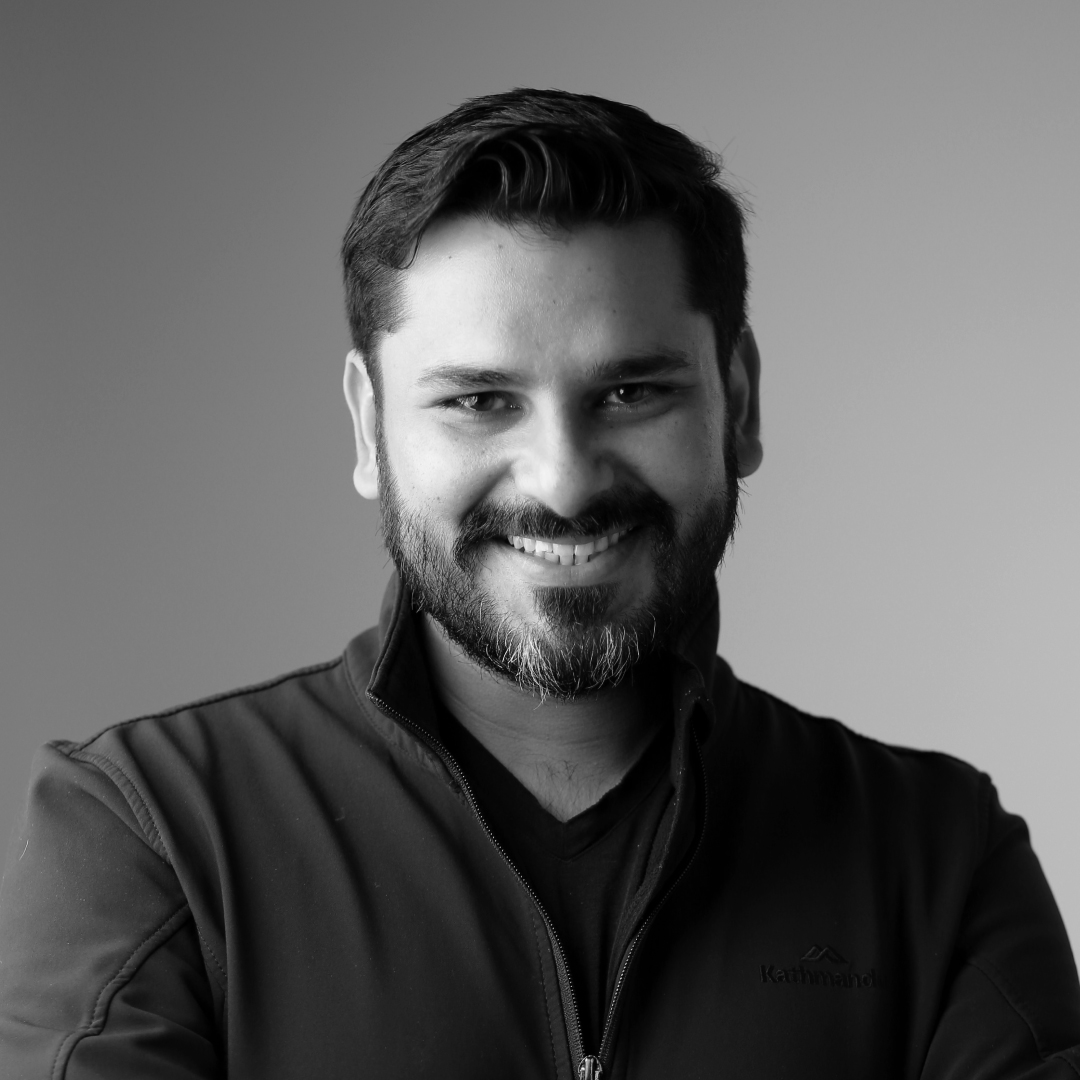

Personal details
- Born: 3 April 1985 (age 41) Karnal, Haryana, India
- Education: University of Pennsylvania
- Known for: Founder of HealthifyMe

Tushar Vashisht (born 3 April 1985) is an Indian entrepreneur. He is the co-founder and CEO of consumer health app HealthifyMe. He is a former investment banker, was an early employee at Aadhaar and is a University of Pennsylvania graduate.

== Early life ==
Vashisht was born in Karnal, Haryana, to SN Vashisht, former Director General of Police of Haryana, and Dr. Suneeta Madan, daughter of veterinary scientist ML Madan.

Vashisht did his K-12 in different schools in Haryana before graduating from Sardar Patel Vidyalaya in New Delhi in 2003. He spent his first two college years between Delhi College of Engineering and Netaji Subhas Institute of Technology, before transferring to and graduating with a BAS in computer science from the University of Pennsylvania in 2007.

== Career ==
Vashisht began his career from Wall Street as an intern for BlackRock. He joined Deutsche Bank full-time as corporate finance analyst in San Francisco before shifting to Singapore. In 2009, he joined the Aadhaar project headed by Nandan Nilekani in Bangalore, where many of the future board members and early investors of HealthifyMe were his colleagues.

Inspired by his own weight gain within a year of returning to India, Vashisht started HealthifyMe in 2012, with Mathew Cherian and Sachin Shenoy as co-founders with "a vision to help Indians be healthier and fitter using online tools". According to him, it is India's "first comprehensive calorie tracker". The company would later add digital nutritionists and trainers as subscription service. In 2019, it launched AI-powered "Smart Plans" recommended by its digital nutritionist "Ria", based on customer habits and medical conditions. The company went on to raise four rounds of funding including a series B funding of US$ 18 million in 2018. In 2019, HealthifyMe was reported to be the top rated Indian startup on Google Play Store.

While at HealthifyMe and during their poverty line experiment, Vashisht advocated for better nutrition policies for Indians. He advocated for better protein subsidy for the masses in 2011–12 in front of the Planning Commission and National Advisory Council, as well as on other forums. In 2018, he gave a presentation during the India-Russia Business Summit, in front of Indian Prime Minister, Narendra Modi, and Russian President Vladimir Putin.

== Poverty experiment ==
In 2011, Vashisht lived on ₹100 a day and ₹32 a day for a month, alongside Mathew Cherian. The duo documented their experience on a blog and went on to advocate for the improvement of the average and poor Indian, especially in the field of nutrition, travel, employment and addiction. They concluded that ₹ 32 was insufficient to survive on, while ₹ 120 a day was the income level required to exit poverty.

== Music ==
Vashisht is a trained Hindustani classical singer and was a member of Penn Masala between 2005 and 2007. His composition "Pehchaan" was the title song of the album released in 2007. The song was featured on America's Best of College A Capella in 2008.
