= Indian Cowboy =

Indian Cowboy A Love-Love Story
- Directed by: Nikhil Kamkolkar
- Starring: Sheetal Sheth; Nikhil Kamkolkar; Deep Katdare
- Release date: 2004
- Country: United States
- Language: English

Indian Cowboy is a 2004 American film written and directed by Nikhil Kamkolkar featuring Sheetal Sheth, himself, and Deep Katdare, this film premiered at the Rhode Island International Film Festival in August 2004 and was released in North America on February 23, 2007.

Indian Cowboy released on Amazon Prime streaming in May 2016. Nikhil Kamkolkar spoke about it with Mashable and referred to the true democratization of distribution for filmmakers.

== Cast ==
- Nikhil Kamkolkar as Nick
