= Lynne Lawner =

American poet

Lynne Lawner (born April 10, 1935) is an American scholar, art historian, poet, translator, and photographer based in New York City.

== Writing ==
Lawner’s books about art history emphasize iconographical themes, the meaning of art, as well as social customs. Among these are: Lives of the Courtesans: Portraits of the Renaissance (1986); I Modi: The Sixteen Pleasures -- An Erotic Album of the Italian Renaissance (1988); Harlequin on the Moon: Commedia dell’Arte and the Visual Arts (1998). She has lectured and taught on the subject of courtesans in places including University of North Carolina Chapel Hill, Vassar College, the Chicago Art Institute, the Harvard Club of New York City, and the National Arts Club. Her work on I Modi has been praised and defended by such disparate organs as scholarly journals and the periodical Penthouse Forum.

Lawner has published two collections of poetry: Wedding Night of A Nun and Triangle Dream, the latter "frustrating, brilliant, occasionally moving" according to Kirkus Reviews. She won Poetry magazine’s Oscar Blumenthal Prize and later was invited to an artist residency at Yaddo. Her many translations of Italian poetry have appeared in journals such as Chelsea, Yale Italian Poetry, Italian Poetry Journal. In spring 2010, her edition Painted Fire: Selected Poetry of Maria Luisa Spaziani was published by Chelsea Press, New York City. Another Italian translation work by Lawner is Letters from Prison by Antonio Gramsci, which was commissioned by the Ford Foundation Translation Center and published as a book in the 1970s.

== Life ==
Lawner was born on April 10, 1935 in Dayton, Ohio. She received a B.A. degree from Wellesley College and her Ph.D. from Columbia University. She won a Henry Fellowship from Harvard University and Yale University, to study at Newnham College, Cambridge. She has also been a Woodrow Wilson Fellow and an American Association of University Women grantee. Through the years she has been a Fellow of the Radcliffe Institute for Advanced Study, Villa I Tatti (the Harvard Center for Renaissance Italian Studies), and the Center for Advanced Studies in the Visual Arts at the National Gallery of Art in Washington DC. She has also been a Fulbright grantee to Italy: in Rome and as Senior Fulbright Research Fellow in Venice and Naples.

Much of Lawner’s scholarly work, poetry, and translations draw on her long-term residence in Rome, Italy (from 1958 through 1983). She has also been influenced by sojourns in the Swiss Alps over a period of many years. An artist’s edition of her poems together with her photographs, designed by Francesco Dondina and curated by Fabio Castelli, will be printed in 2011 in Milan, entitled Engadin Impressions.

Between 2006 and 2010, she has developed her art of semi-abstract nature photography. Exhibitions are planned in Italy and Switzerland; she has been invited to participate in St. Moritz Arts Festival 2011.

== Bibliography ==
=== History and art history books ===
- Gramsci, Antonio (1975). Lawner, Lynne (ed.). Letters from Prison. Translated by Lawner, Lynne (1 ed.). Jonathan Cape Ltd. ISBN 978-0224009751.
- Lawner, Lynne (1987). Lives of the courtesans: portraits of the Renaissance (1 ed.). New York City, New York: Rizzoli. ISBN 9780847807383 – via Google Books.
- I Modi (1988). Lawner, Lynn (ed.). I Modi: The Sixteen Pleasures – an Erotic Album of the Italian Renaissance:Giulio Romano, Marcantonio Raimondi, Pietro Aretino, and Count Jean-Frederic-Maximilien de Waldeck. Evanston, IL: Northwestern University. ISBN 9780810108042 – via Google Books.
- Lawner, Lynne (1998). Harlequin on the moon: Commedia dell'arte and the Visual Arts. Harry N. Abrams. ISBN 9780810911949.

=== Poetry books ===
- Lawner, Lynn (1964). Wedding Night of A Nun. Atlantic Monthly Press, Little, Brown and Company – via Google Books.
- Lawner, Lynne (1969). Triangle Dream, poems. Harper & Row. ASIN B000NVCXCO.

=== Articles ===
- Lawner, Lynn (1987-11-15). "Venezuela's Island in the Caribbean". The New York Times.
- Lawner, Lynn (2001-10-21). "The Art of Seduction". The Los Angeles Times.
