= Andrew Kuper =

South African-Australian entrepreneur and investor

Andrew Kuper AO
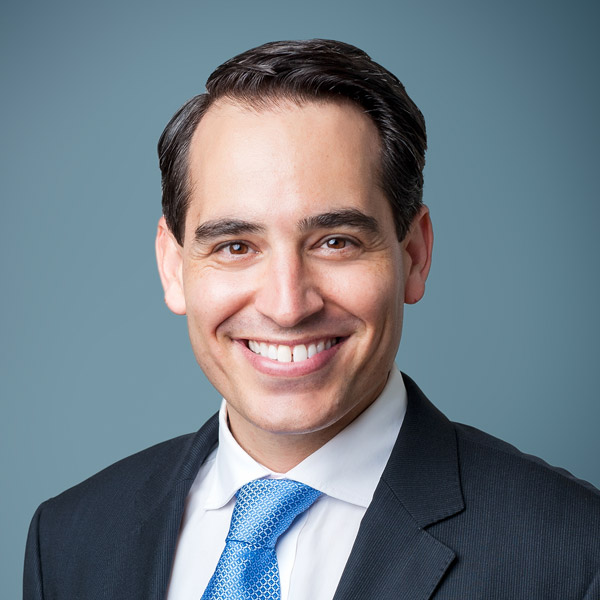
- LeapFrog Founder and CEO Andrew Kuper
- Born: South Africa
- Education: Harvard University; Witwatersrand University; University of Cambridge (PhD)
- Occupations: Entrepreneur, businessman, investor and author
- Known for: CEO, founder, LeapFrog Investments

Andrew Kuper AO is a South African-Australian entrepreneur and investor. Kuper is the founder and CEO of LeapFrog Investments, a specialist investor in financial services, healthcare and climate solutions in global markets.

Former United States President Bill Clinton announced the launch of the company in 2008, recognizing it for opening new frontiers in alternative investing. As of 2025, LeapFrog has attracted more than US$2.8 billion from global investors. In 2017, Fortune ranked LeapFrog Investments as one of the top 5 Companies to Change the World, alongside Apple and Novartis. Originally from South Africa, Kuper now resides in Sydney, Australia, and spends time in LeapFrog's offices in Europe, Africa and Asia.

== Early life ==
Kuper was born in South Africa and brought up on a farm outside of Johannesburg. He is the son of anti-apartheid campaigners. He began investing at the age of 10 and took on his first clients at age 13. He attended the University of Witwatersrand in Johannesburg followed by Harvard University, where he won the Henry Fellowship. He later graduated from Cambridge University with a PhD in social science and political science supervised by Nobel laureate Amartya Sen.

== Career ==
=== Early career ===
In 2004, Kuper was appointed managing director at Ashoka, an organization that finances thousands of social entrepreneurs. Among other roles, he ran the Global Academy for Social Entrepreneurship, working with Muhammad Yunus of Grameen Bank and Fazle Abed of BRAC.

=== LeapFrog ===
In 2007, Kuper founded LeapFrog Investments. LeapFrog invests in companies that provide access to financial services, healthcare, and climate solutions to underserved people in emerging markets. Since its establishment LeapFrog has attracted over $2 billion from global investors including Temasek, AIA, Prudential Financial, the International Finance Corporation, and the European Investment Bank. The companies in which the firm has invested have had an annual growth rate of more than 24% and reach 492 million people in 30 countries.

LeapFrog launched its Climate Investing Strategy in 2022, and now owns stakes in companies such as Battery Smart in India and Sun King in Africa.

=== Awards ===
In 2018, Kuper was awarded the John S. Bickley Founders Award Gold Medal for Excellence by the International Insurance Society for his work in profit with purpose investment. Earlier in his career, Kuper received the Ernst & Young Entrepreneur of the Year Award. He was also named a Young Global Leader by the World Economic Forum, and received the Young Presidents' Organization's Social Engagement Network Award. Kuper has delivered keynote addresses to the Clinton Global Initiative, Geneva Association CEO Meetings, Global Private Capital Association (GPCA), and the EY World Entrepreneur of the Year event. He is a board member of GPCA.

In 2022, Kuper was appointed Officer of the Order of Australia in the 2022 Queen's Birthday Honors for "distinguished service to the impact investing industry, to global business leadership, and financial inclusion". Kuper was also among 23 Chief Executives and financiers to meet with US President Biden and His Majesty King Charles III as part of the US-UK Climate Finance Mobilization Forum, where he announced a plan to commit US$500m to companies combating climate change in Africa and Asia.

Kuper is the editor and lead author of one book on governance and globalization, Global Responsibilities (Routledge, 2005) and the author of another, Democracy Beyond Borders (Oxford, 2004).

== Bibliography ==
- Kuper, A. (2004). Democracy beyond borders: Justice and representation in global institutions. Oxford: Oxford University Press.
- Kuper, A. (2005). Global responsibilities: Who must deliver on human rights? New York: Routledge.
