= Nadine Kirschon =

Swedish actress

Nadine Madeleine Martina Kirschon (born 19 March 1984 in Stockholm) is a Swedish actress. Kirschon won Best Actress 2005 at the GAFFA - International Film Festival for Young People in Austria in 2005 for her role in Bombay Dreams (film). And winner of Guldkappan in 2003 for her role as Hanna in Love boogie.

== Selected filmography ==
- Livet i Fagervik
- Hotell Kantarell
- Beck – Den svaga länken
- Göta kanal 2 - kanalkampen
- Mon 3
- Jullovsmorgon (2005/2006)
- Bombay Dreams (film) - Camilla *Best Actress 2005, Nadine Kirschon, GAFFA - International Film Festival for Young People, Wien, Austria
- Olivia Twist
- Love boogie - Hanna * Winner Guldklappan 2003
- En ängels tålamod
- En klass för sig
- Dubbel-8 - Angelika
