= Susham Bedi =

Indian writer (1945–2020)

- Born: 26 July 1945; Firozpur, Punjab, British India
- Died: 20 March 2020 (aged 74)
- Occupations: Novelist; actress; academic
- Children: Purva Bedi

Susham Bedi (26 July 1945 – 20 March 2020) was an Indian author of novels, short stories and poetry. She was a professor of Hindi language and literature at the department of Middle Eastern and Asian Languages and Cultures (MEALAC) at Columbia University, New York. She wrote predominantly about the experiences of Indians in the South Asian diaspora, focusing on psychological and 'interior' cultural conflicts. Unlike other prominent Indian American novelists she wrote mainly in Hindi rather than in English. She has been widely translated into English, French, Dutch and other languages by artists, academics, and students.

She was an actress in India in the 1960s and early 1970s. In the United States, she appeared on such shows as True Crime: New York City, Third Watch, and Law & Order: Special Victims Unit, and in movies such as The Guru (2002) and ABCD (1999).

== Career ==
=== Early years ===
Bedi was born on 26 July 1945. She began her writing career in high school and college, entering local competitions and writing articles and stories for magazines. Bedi also worked as an actress and commentator on Indian television in the late-1960s and 1970s.

She attended Delhi University and Panjab University in India and taught Hindi literature. Her PhD dissertation was published in 1984 as Innovation and Experimentation in Contemporary Hindi Drama by Parag publications in India.

From 1974 to 1979 she wrote for The Times of India as one of their correspondents from Brussels, Belgium. In 1979 she came to the United States with her husband.

=== Academia ===
Bedi was involved in exploring questions of identity, authenticity, and transformation, in her cultural criticism and academic work, and these themes are reflected as well in her fiction writing. She was the author of eight major Hindi language novels, as well as collections of Hindi short stories and poetry. These have been widely translated and have been the subject of academic dissertations and debates on the South Asian diaspora experience.

She was also involved in Hindi language pedagogical research and developed original reading and listening comprehension materials in Hindi. Many of these materials are available on the internet. Her "Using Authentic Materials in the Language Classroom: A Case in Hindi" was included in the anthology Teaching and Acquisition of South Asian Languages (University of Pennsylvania Press).

From 1990 to 1991, she contributed to a BBC weekly program, Letters from Abroad, in which she discussed day to day issues about life in New York.

=== Fiction writing ===
Her most well-known novel is Havan (1989), which was translated into English by David Rubin and published by Heinemann International under the title The Fire Sacrifice in 1993. Her novels and short stories often feature female protagonists who are in the process of negotiating new identities which are neither fully old nor new, often finding identity and strength in the impurities in their lives. Bedi's narrative focus tends to be on the negotiative and transformative process itself, the pain and tragedy of cultural loss, but also the sense of hope and opportunity in forging new and stronger identities if one is willing to endure the transformative process. Her works are thus located squarely in the South Asian diaspora and immigrant experience.

=== Acting ===
Bedi appeared on True Crime: New York City (credited as Sushami Bedi), Third Watch, and Law & Order: Special Victims Unit, and in movies such as The Guru (2002) and ABCD (1999).

== Personal life ==
She died on 20 March 2020 at the age of 74.

Actress Purva Bedi is her daughter.

== Awards and recognition ==
In 2007, she was awarded 100,000 rupees by Uttar Pradesh Hindi Sansthan for her contributions to Hindi language and literature.

In January 2006, she was honored by Sahitya Academy in Delhi for her contributions to Hindi literature.

== Bibliography ==
=== Novels and short stories ===
- Maine Nata Tora (I Broke the Ties), Bhartiya Gyanpith, 2009.
- Sarak ki Laya (Rhythm of the Road, second short story collection), National Publishing House, 2007.
- Portrait of Mira, National Publishing House, Delhi, 2006.
- Morche (Battlefronts), (novel) Delhi, Vani Prakashan, 2006.
- Shabdon Ki Khirkiyan (Words as Windows), (Poetry collection) Delhi, National Publishing House, 2006.
- Nava Bhum Ki Ras-katha (Epic of the New Land), Delhi: National Publishing House, 2002.
- Gatha Amerbel Ki (Song of the Amerbel), Delhi: National Publishing House, 1999.
- Itar, (The Other), Delhi: National Publishing House, 1998.
- Chiriya Aur Cheel (The Sparrow and the Kite: Short Story Collection), Delhi: Parag, 1995.
- Katra Dar Katra (Drop by Drop), Chandigarh: Abhishek, 1994.
- Lautna, (Returning), Delhi: Parag, 1992.
- Havan (The Fire Sacrifice), Delhi: Parag, 1989.

=== Cultural and critical works ===
- Hindi Basha Ka Bhumandalikaran (The Globalization of Hindi), Samsamyil Prakashan, 2012.
- Kahan Hai Mera Gher (What is Home to me?). Vaagarth 113, Calcutta, Dec. 2004
- Diaspora me Hindi sahitya (Hindi Literature in the Diaspora: State and Direction). Bhasha 42,5, Delhi, Mar-April 2003, pp 105–112.
- "Quest for Identity: Grappling for the Literary Self in the Diaspora" Hindi: Language, Discourse and Writing. Volume 1 Issue 2. July–September 2000.
- Hindi Natya Prayog Ke Sandarbh Men (Innovation and Experimentation in Hindi Drama), Delhi: Parag, 1984.

=== Pedagogy ===
- "Bhasha Shikshan: Anubhav, Soch aur Chunotiyan ( Teaching Language: Experience, Thoughts and Challenges)". ANYATHA 1, Austin, USA, June 2004
- "Two Sides of a Coin: Heads and/or Tails" Hindi: Language, Discourse and Writing. Volume 2 Issue 4. January–March 2002.
- "Using Authentic Materials in the Language Classroom: A Case at Hand." Published in the anthology The Learning and Acquisition of South Asian Languages, Philadelphia: University of Pennsylvania Press, 1995.
- "Culturally Authentic Situation Cards for the Teaching and Testing of South Asian Languages: Hindi." Published by Consortium for Language Teaching and Learning, New Haven, 1992.
- "Sunna-Samajhna: Listening Comprehension in Hindi (2 volumes and 2 videotapes: Volume I: Novice and Intermediate, Volume II: Advanced)." Published by ACTFL, Yonkers, NY, 1992.
- "Authentic Materials for Developing Reading Comprehension in Hindi (2 volumes: Volume I: Novice and Intermediate, Volume II: Advanced)." Published by ACTFL, Yonkers, NY, 1991.

== Sources ==
- Asian American Novelists: A Bio-Bibliographical Critical Sourcebook edited by Emmanuel S. Nelson. The entry for "Susham Bedi" includes critical appraisals, biography, bibliography, and list of recent writings on or about Susham Bedi's work.
