= Sanjit De Silva =

Sri Lankan actor and director

- Born: October 31, 1976 (age 49); Colombo, Sri Lanka
- Education: New York University (MFA)
- Occupations: Actor, director
- Years active: 2001–present
- Website: Official site

Sanjit De Silva (born 31 October 1976) is a Sri Lankan actor and director who is known for his roles in The Company Men and American Desi.

== Early life ==
De Silva was born in Colombo and graduated from New York University's Tisch School of the Arts.

== Career ==
De Silva appeared in his first television series, American Desi, in the role of Chandu. In 2005 he appeared as a doctor in Jonny Zero and Law & Order: Special Victims Unit. De Silva has also appeared in several Law & Order franchise series, where he appeared as V.J. in season 5, episode 2: "Diamond Dogs" of Law & Order: Criminal Intent and Ali Mohammed in season 17, episode 15: "Melting Pot" Law & Order. In 2013, he directed his first film Time After where he received funds from Kickstarter with over 200 backers for the film.

In 2016, De Silva appeared in Thomas Kail's production of the world premiere of Dry Powder at The Public Theater in New York City opposite Hank Azaria, Claire Danes and John Krasinski. In Summer of 2016, De Silva performed at New York's Shakespeare in the Park in Troilus and Cressida. He also appeared in TV commercials on behalf of Shakespeare in the Park.

He starred as Azeem Bhatti in the play An Ordinary Muslim, written by Hammaad Chaudry at the New York Theatre Workshop in 2018.

== Personal life ==
De Silva is married to British-Indian actress Deepa Purohit and they have one child.

== Filmography ==
=== Film ===
Year	Title	Role
2007	Arranged	Jamil
2008	August	Jonathan
2008	After Hiroshima Mon Amour	
2009	The Hungry Ghosts	Mohammed
2010	The Company Men	Tom
2013	Time After	Vivek Pandya
2014	Saving Rohan	Arun Mehta
2015	The Girl Is in Trouble	Indran
2020	Farewell Amor	Mr. Uno

=== Television ===
Year	Title	Role
2001	American Desi	Chandu
2005	Jonny Zero	Doctor
2005	Law & Order: Trial by Jury	A.D.A. Ed Kapoor
2005	Law & Order: Special Victims Unit	Doctor
2005	Law & Order: Criminal Intent	V.J
2006	Six Degrees	Happy Man
2007	Law & Order	Ali Mohammed
2007	I'm Paige Wilson	Myles Mitchell
2009	The Unusuals	Vikram Neel
2010	The Good Wife	Amal Verma
2011	Blue Bloods	Sammy Khan
2013	Homeland	Anoush
2015	Elementary	Dr. Amrit
