= Transnational American studies =

Research in transnational American studies, a field of American studies, foregrounds the complex relationships amongst nations, cultures and histories that intersect with the United States of America. A significant impulse driving the development of transnationalist American studies is the pursuit of analytical methods that are less likely to reinforce the ideology of American exceptionalism by removing the nation state as the "natural" frame for analysis. This re-examination of American studies can be seen as a critical response to the significant role the U.S. State Department historically played in promoting American studies outside of the United States. Shelley Fisher Fishkin, in her 2004 Presidential Address to the American Studies Association, argued that a transnational focus for American studies would foster studies that frame the United States as a "participant in a global flow of people, ideas, texts, and products."

It has been suggested that the rise of transnational American studies is a result of international associations of American studies scholars setting the stage for transnational American studies as well as an inevitable result of the decades of scholarship done on nationalism. Bauridl and Wiegmink report that the field of transnational American studies has shifted away from the nation state as a container of an individual's identity to an understanding in which the nation state is one node in a networked phenomenon.

== Debating transnational American studies ==
The argument has also been made that transnationalization of American literary and cultural studies is actually the continuation of a strain of Americanist exceptionalist critique. Fluck has argued that the studying of American studies "has hardly begun" because revisionism has been a central activity of American studies for decades.

Scholars such as Wai Chi Dimock, Brian T. Edwards and Dilip Parameshwar Gaonkar, and Perin E. Gürel have argued for expanding the linguistic boundaries of transnational American Studies. Books by Edwards and Gürel, for example, highlight how U.S. cultural exports are locally interpreted and repurposed in Middle Eastern settings.

== Associations, scholarly journals, and institutions ==
The American Studies Association's International Committee promotes transnational as well as international scholarship. This standing committee of the American Studies Association is responsible for informing the ASA membership of the issues affecting international scholars and students in the profession and it is responsible for special tasks involving international scholars and students in the ASA membership.

The Journal of Transnational American Studies (JTAS) is an open access journal founded in 2009 by Shelley Fisher Fishkin and Shirley Geok-lin Lim. They were joined on the editorial board by Takayuki Tatsumi and Alfred Hornung. According to American studies journals, JTAS was the first academic journal to pursue what Shelley Fisher Fishkin called the "transnational turn" in American studies.

The Journal of Transnational American Studies is published by the University of California's California Digital Library and indexed by the Directory of Open Access Journals, the American Studies Journals Directory, and the MLA Bibliography. The Library of Congress selected the journal to be housed in the library's permanent archive of electronic publications.

The ASA's International Committee established in 2019 the Shelley Fisher Fiskin Prize for International Scholarship in Transnational American Studies.

The Obama Institute for Transnational American Studies at Johannes Gutenberg University Mainz in Germany offers an undergraduate, masters and PhD degrees in American studies.
