= Farewell Amor =

2020 American drama film directed by Ekwa Msangi

- Film poster
- Directed by: Ekwa Msangi
- Written by: Ekwa Msangi
- Produced by: Bobby Allen; Sam Bisbee; Ekwa Msangi; Joe Plummer; Josh Penn; Huriyyah Muhammad
- Starring: Ntare Mwine; Zainab Jah; Jayme Lawson; Joie Lee; Nana Mensah; Sanjit De Silva; Joel Michaely; Souléymane Sy Savané
- Cinematography: Bruce Francis Cole
- Edited by: Jeanne Applegate; Justin Chan
- Music by: Osei Essed
- Production companies: MACRO; LUCKFILM; MUBI; Wavelength Productions; Department of Motion Pictures; Park Pictures; Jhumka Films; Lucky 13 Productions; Outrageous Pictures
- Distributed by: IFC Midnight; MUBI
- Release dates: January 25, 2020 (Sundance); December 11, 2020
- Running time: 101 minutes
- Country: United States
- Languages: English; Portuguese
- Box office: $4,689

Farewell Amor is a 2020 American drama film written and directed by Ekwa Msangi. It premiered at the 2020 Sundance Film Festival. The film tells the story of a family of Angolan immigrants who reunite in the United States after a years-long separation, and is told from the perspective of the mother, father, and daughter.

== Plot ==
Walter came to the United States from Angola long ago in search of a better life. He has since settled in New York where he works as a cab driver. His wife Esther and daughter Sylvia are just now able to join him in the US after 17 years apart. Both Walter and Esther have found ways to cope with the time and distance apart—with Walter carrying on a new relationship, and Esther finding community in the church. Walter regretfully breaks up with his girlfriend Linda prior to his family’s arrival. In Brooklyn, the family of three must share a one-bedroom apartment. Esther finds herself struggling not only to adjust to a new country and culture, but also to a distant husband and a marriage that has seemingly lost its fire. The teenage Sylvia also struggles with homesickness, but pursues dance against the wishes of her mother.

== Cast ==
- Ntare Mwine as Walter
- Zainab Jah as Esther
- Jayme Lawson as Sylvia
- Joie Lee as Nzingha
- Marcus Scribner as DJ
- Nana Mensah as Linda
- Brandon Lamar as Tall Handsome
- Felipe Almonte as Loving Boyfriend
- Dylan Flashner as MC
- Sanjit De Silva as Mr. Uno
- Darlene Arrington as Dirty Dozen
- Joel Michaely as Aubrey
- Souléymane Sy Savané as Pastor Ogunbemi

== Release ==
It was released on December 11, 2020 in the USA. It was released on December 18, 2020 on MUBI. It was screened at 51st International Film Festival of India in January 2021 in World Panorama section.

=== Home media ===
On June 14, 2022, Farewell Amor was released on Blu-Ray and DVD by The Criterion Collection.

== Reception ==
Farewell Amor received critical praise, holding a 97% approval rating on Rotten Tomatoes based on 71 reviews, with an average rating of 7.5/10. The website's critics consensus reads: "A striking debut feature for writer-director Ekwa Msangi, Farewell Amor movingly captures the fallout from a long-separated family's reunion." Metacritic reports a score of 75 out of 100 based on the opinions of 16 critics, indicating "generally favorable" reviews.

Farewell Amor was praised for its acting and direction. Writing for the Los Angeles Times, Kevin Crust wrote, "Though the film is shaped by big topics such as immigration, race, identity and religion, its power lies in its universality achieved through the small human details that tell its story of love and family. Its beauty lies in its empathy — something currently in short supply and therefore very welcome in the stories we consume."
