= Penn Masala =

American a cappella group

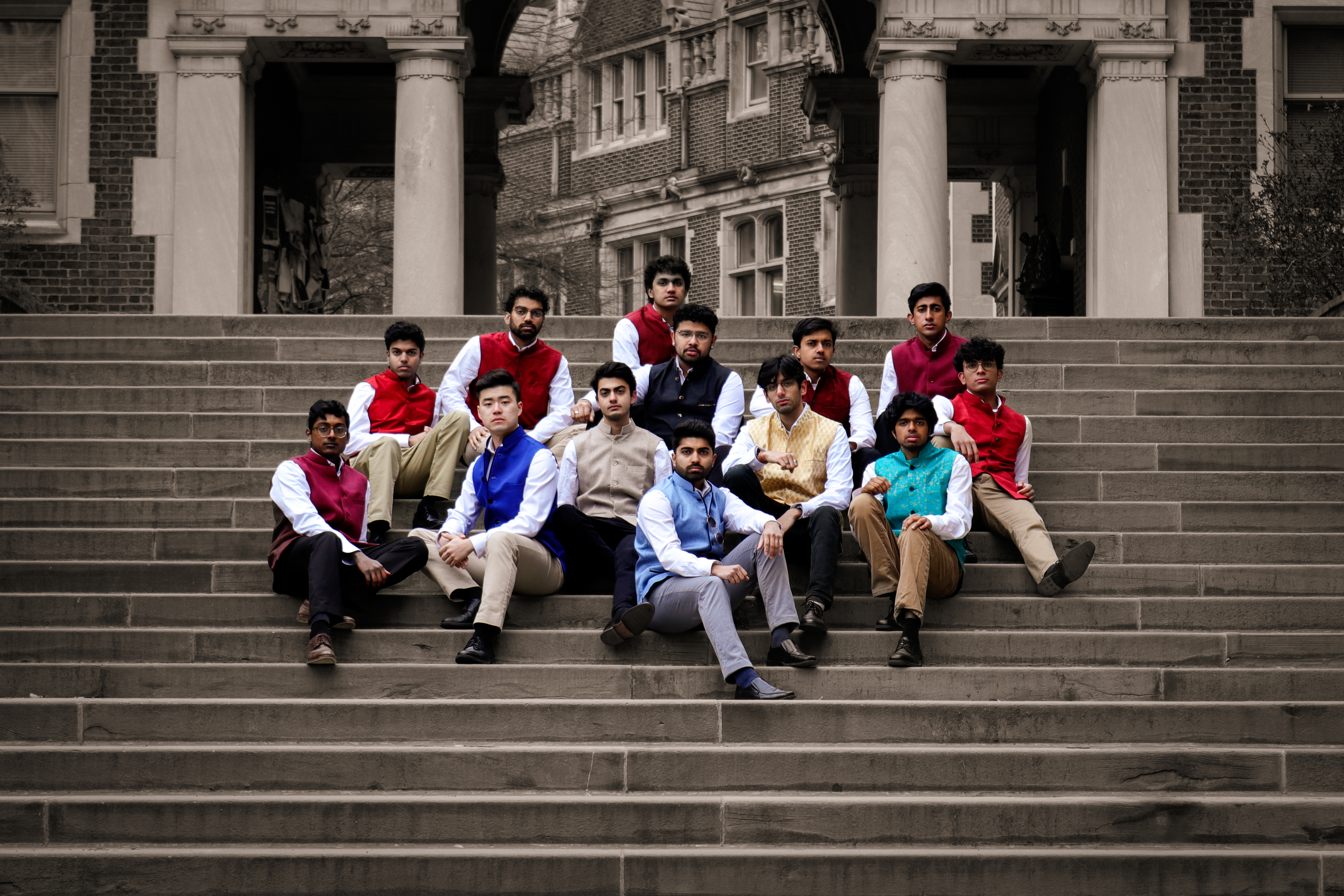
- Penn Masala in 2023

Background information
- Origin: University of Pennsylvania, Philadelphia, Pennsylvania, United States
- Genres: World, a cappella
- Years active: 1996–present
- Website: Official website

Penn Masala is an American Indian origin a cappella group. It is the world's first Indian origin and premier a cappella group. Formed in 1996 by students at the University of Pennsylvania, Penn Masala's music has been influenced by the Indian and Western cultures that represent the group's membership. The group was featured on the soundtrack of American Desi, and has released twelve full-length albums: Awaaz, 11 PM, Soundcheck, The Brown Album, Pehchaan, On Detours, Panoramic, Kaavish, Resonance,Yuva, Musafir, Midnight Oil, an EP titled Vol. 1 and the compilation album Out of Stock. The group has performed at the White House (in October 2009 via invitation of Barack Obama and June 2023 via invitation from Joe Biden).

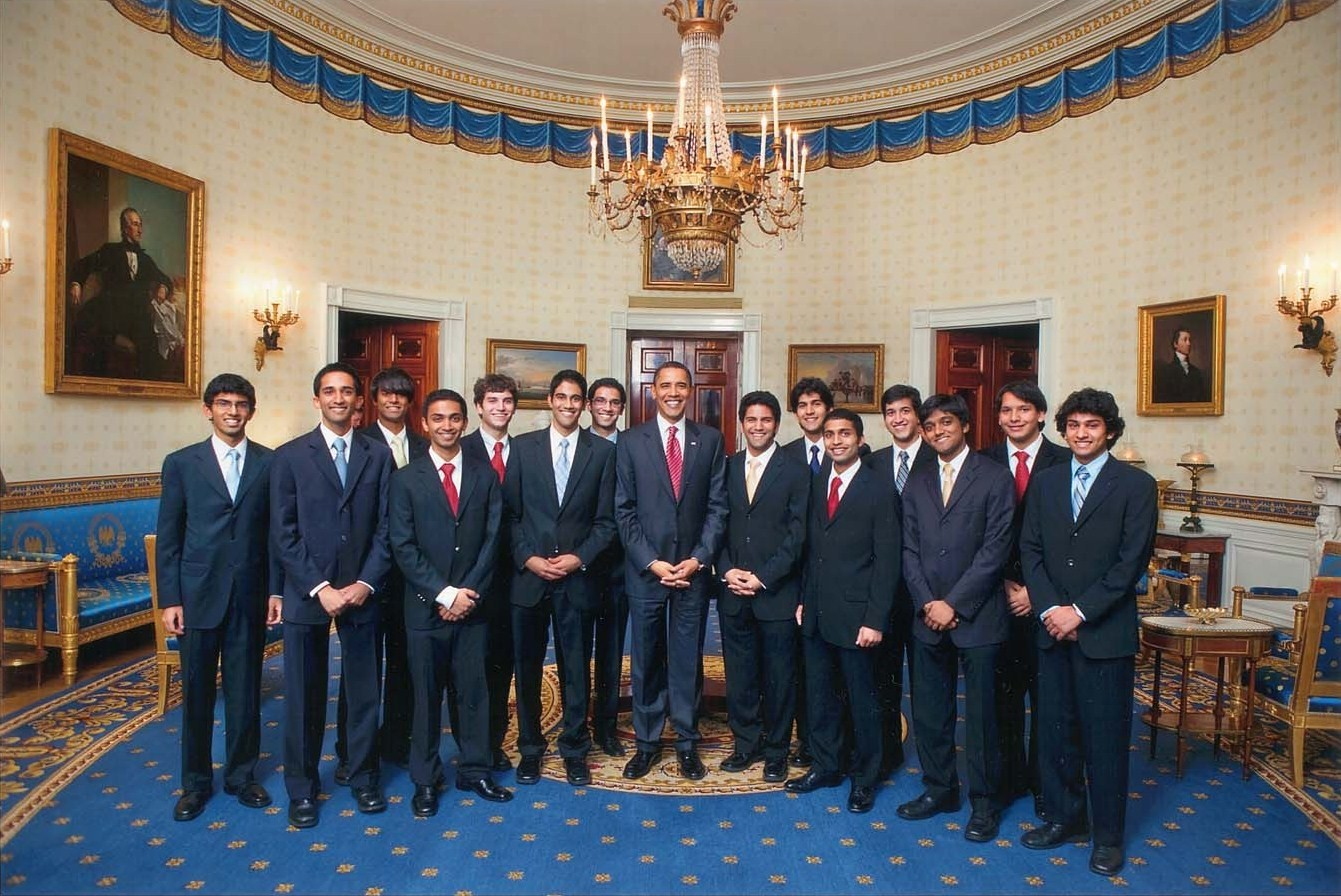
Penn Masala performs in the Blue Room of the White House in October 2009 due to invite from President Barack Obama

Penn Masala has also performed for the Indian Filmfare Awards, and for prominent leaders including Henry Kissinger, Ban Ki-moon, Mukesh Ambani, and Narendra Modi. The group also had a cameo role in Pitch Perfect 2, released in May 2015.

== History ==
Penn Masala, often stylized as pennmasala, was formed in 1996 by students at the University of Pennsylvania who wanted to represent their subcontinental heritage and music through a cappella singing. Among other, more long-standing a cappella groups, Penn Masala stood out as the only one in the world that sang Hindi music. This defining characteristic of the group brought it immediate attention as members fused Hindi and English music in original song formats. Soon, the group began to bill itself as "The world's first and premier Hindi a cappella group". Within just four years of its inception, Penn Masala had gained close to 15 members. By 2002, the group released its first two CDs: Awaaz (Hindi for sound) was released in 1999, and 11 PM was released in 2001. Over the next 3 years, Penn Masala released two more full-length albums, Soundcheck and The Brown Album, and a compilation CD entitled Out of Stock, which included favorites from the first 3 albums. In 2007, the group released its fifth studio album, Pehchaan (Hindi for identity). The group followed up the success of Pehchaan with their sixth album, On Detours, which was released in March 2009 and Panoramic, released in 2011. In 2013, they released their eighth studio album titled Kaavish, which features the hit single "Fix You / Ishq Bina". In March 2014, Penn Masala released The Evolution of Bollywood Music video, which has since received over 1 million views on YouTube. They were invited to perform at the 2014 IIFA Awards as a result of the media attention they subsequently received. In the fall of 2014, Penn Masala released a music video for their cover of Manwa Laage from the movie Happy New Year, featuring prominent artist Jonita Gandhi. The track was selected to be on the Best of College A Cappella (BOCA) album in 2015. In March 2015, Penn Masala released The Bollywood Breakdown, a compilation of contemporary songs that combine elements of hip-hop with Bollywood music. In May 2015, Penn Masala released the music video for Tonight (I'm Lovin’ You) / Dilliwaali Girlfriend, a mix featured on their ninth album, Resonance. The group had a cameo role in Pitch Perfect 2, released in May 2015, as competitors to the Barden Bellas. The soundtrack for the movie included Penn Masala's Hindi version of "Any Way You Want It", and won the award for the Best Soundtrack at the American Music Awards in 2015. Their tenth studio album, Yuva, was released in 2017. An EP, Vol. 1, was released in 2018, their eleventh album, Musafir, was released in 2020, and their twelfth and most recent album, Midnight Oil, was released in 2022. In 2023, President Joe Biden invited them to the White House; they sang "Chaiya Chaiya" for Prime Minister Modi when Modi visited the United States in June of that year. Eminent dignitaries were also there at the state dinner that day including tech leaders such as Sundar Pichai (who later congratulated them on the occasion), Tim Cook, Satya Nadella, and Raj Subramaniam; and musicians such as the violinist, Joshua Bell, who shook hands with all the members. In 2024, Masala was invited to perform at the Paris Olympics at the first-ever Team India Olympic House. The weekend long back-to-back performances were full-length shows for international audiences at the Olympic Village. The performances were attended by notable athletes and Team India leadership, including the Indian Men's Hockey team.

== Performances ==
Penn Masala's logo

Penn Masala performs around the world, with much of their traveling done in the United States; the group performs at numerous universities and events across the world, spanning cities from Kolkata to London to Montreal and San Francisco.

In 1998, soon after the release of Awaaz, Penn Masala went on its first international tour to the United Kingdom, hitting the airwaves and performing all across the United Kingdom. The group gave two particularly noteworthy concerts in New York City: once in 2000 at the Zee Gold Bollywood Awards in the Nassau Coliseum, and again in 2002 at the Bollywood Music Awards in the Hammerstein Ballroom.

== India tours ==
The group has travelled to India multiple times. In 2002, the group travelled to Mumbai, India to perform at the Star Screen Awards, during which time the members appeared on MTV Asia. In 2006, the group celebrated its 10th anniversary with a tour of India. The men performed at such venues as the National Centre for the Performing Arts at Nariman Point in Mumbai and Swabhumi in Kolkata. In January 2010, the group did another tour across India, selling out the Hard Rock Cafes in New Delhi and Mumbai. Penn Masala also performed at the Oberoi Trident at a ceremony honoring the achievements of Reliance Industries Chairman Mukesh Ambani. Present were many notable personalities, including Nita Ambani, director Rajkumar Hirani, director/producer Vidhu Vinod Chopra, former Chief Minister of Jammu and Kashmir Farooq Abdullah, actors Imran Khan, Rahul Bose and Vinod Khanna, and cricketer Sachin Tendulkar among others. The group also performed at the well-known Lumbini Park Amphitheatre in Hyderabad, and were featured in numerous media outlets, including NDTV, CNBC TV 18, BBC Asia, The Hindustan Times, Zee TV, and CNN-IBN among others. Penn Masala's fourth India tour took place in January 2013, where they shot a music video of "Fix You / Ishq Bina" and performed in five cities across all of the Hard Rock Cafes in the entire country. The January 2013 tour was covered by many major India new outlets, including The Times of India and DNA India, who met with members Ram Narayan and Sam Levenson to write about the tour. Their most recent tour to India was in May 2023.

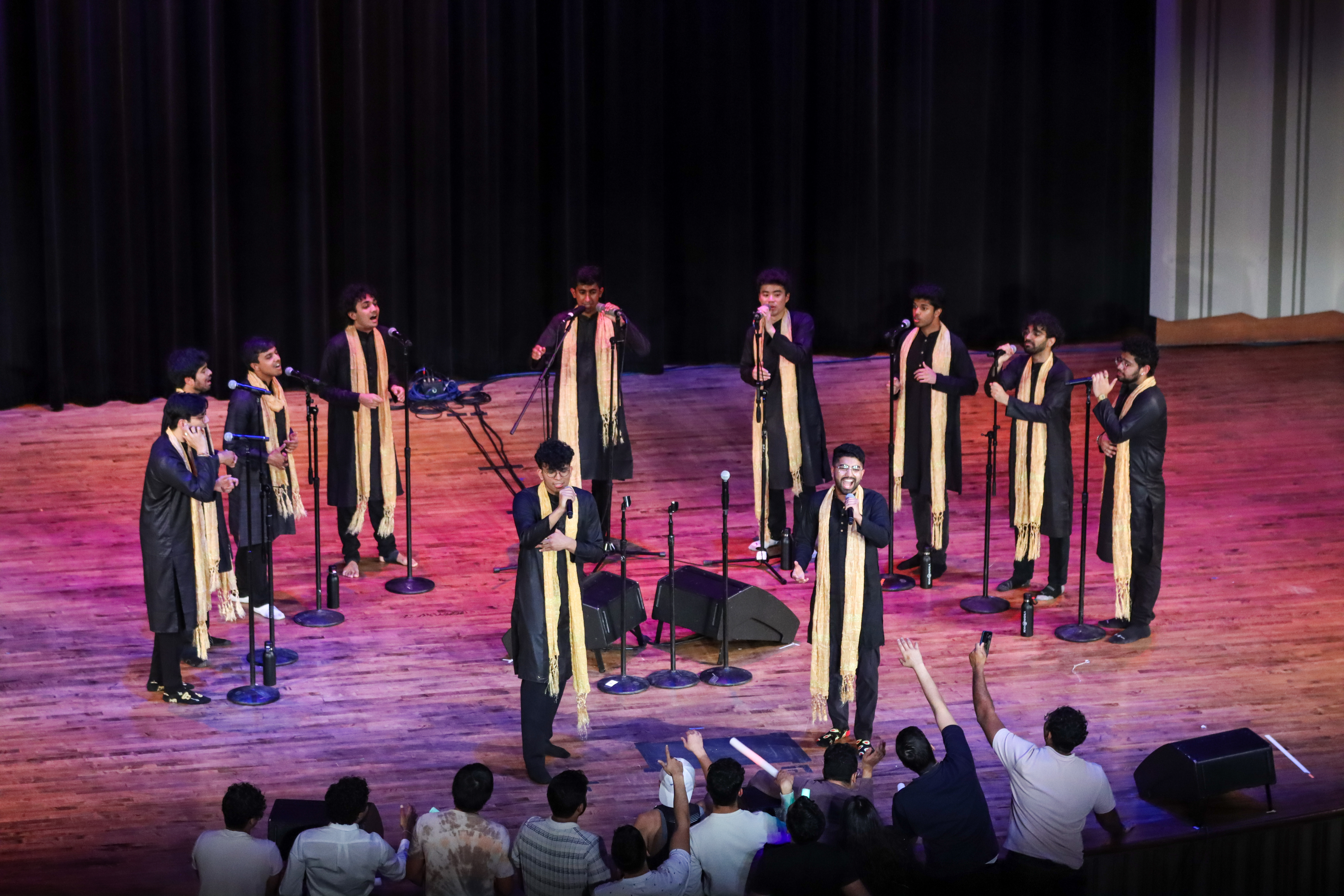
Penn Masala performing at Irvine Auditorium in 2023.

== United Kingdom and Canada tours ==
After its initial United Kingdom tour, Penn Masala continued reaching out to audiences abroad with a tour of the nation in March 2010. Among others, two notable performances were at St. James Piccadilly in central London, and in Hammersmith, where the group headlined a nationwide music competition. In November 2010 Penn Masala performed in Montreal, their first Canadian performance in ten years. Then again in 2012, Penn Masala toured the United Kingdom and did a show for The Rajasthani Foundation's Diwali Charity Gala Ball. Audience members included the Hinduja Brothers of the Hinduja Group, Lakshmi Narayan Mittal, Europe's richest man and CEO of ArcelorMittal, as well as the company's CFO Aditya Mittal. The group performed in the United Kingdom in October 2018 as well.

== Domestic tours ==
Penn Masala concert at the World Congress Center in Atlanta, Georgia

Every semester, Penn Masala tours at a few university campuses. For example, in 2011, Penn Masala performed full-length shows at University of Michigan, Vanderbilt University, Ohio University, University of Houston, Rutgers University, Philadelphia Museum of Art, University of North Carolina, University of Maryland and a second performance at Rutgers University, as well as an international gig in the United Kingdom. The group performed at Southern Methodist University for Bhangra Blitz in April 2013. However, on top of these routine performances, Penn Masala has also performed for a number of famous individuals ranging from Anderson Cooper to Henry Kissinger to Ban Ki-moon.

On October 14, 2009, Penn Masala performed at the White House in Washington, D.C. for the White House's celebration of Diwali and the signing ceremony of the Initiative on Asian Americans and Pacific Islanders. The event took place in the East Room, with attendees including President Barack Obama, the Secretary of Commerce and Secretary of Education, associate director of Public Engagement Kalpen Modi (also known as Kal Penn), members of Congress, and distinguished community members. Penn Masala opened the ceremony with a performance which was followed by a speech by President Obama, who commended their creative energy and contributions to the Asian American community. In fact in 2012, it was leaked that along with artists such as Jay-Z, Adam Levine, Fergie, Arcade Fire and others, Penn Masala was to be courted by President Barack Obama's team in order to obtain their celebrity endorsement. In 2011, Penn Masala was invited to perform for the presidents of universities all over the world as well as UN Secretary-General Ban Ki-moon.

Penn Masala also holds a large annual spring concert at the University of Pennsylvania in the university's largest performance venue, Irvine Auditorium. The concert features a wide selection of their songs, and incorporates humor throughout the show using skits and videos that often parody or spoof popular culture. The end of the show is usually marked by a traditional gathering of Masala alumni and current members of the group on stage to commemorate the group and its extensive alumni network

== Music ==
Penn Masala combines various musical traditions, including Hindi film music, pop, hip-hop, R&B, rock, and Indian classical styles. The group also uses a wide array of languages in their songs. Their compositions are primarily sung in English or Hindi, but certain songs include Arabic, Punjabi, Kannada, and Tamil as well.

Penn Masala blends popular songs to create its own independent version, which is melodically and thematically unified. Most songs fuse popular Hindi and English songs (in the past the group has covered songs by artists such as U2 and Justin Timberlake), into an a cappella rendition. Some songs are purely Hindi; for example, "Bahara" on Panoramic, and "Yeh Honsla" on On Detours and others purely English, such as "What Goes Around Comes Around" on On Detours. Other songs, such as "Aicha" and "Is Pal Mein", incorporate Hindi and English lyrics into a single song. "Aankhon Mein Tu Hai" also includes Tamil verses, "Saade Dil Te", "Kangna" and "Tere Werga" incorporate Punjabi songs, while "Masala Dosa" begins with the Kannada hymn "Krishna Ni Begane", "Aicha" includes Arabic verses and "Fix You - Ishq Bina" includes Bengali. While most of the group's songs are interpretations of already-existing songs, the group also composes originals (one or two per album), such as "Main Tanha" and "Pehchaan" on the album Pehchaan, "Kal Ka Sapna" and "Distant Places" on On Detours, "Is Pal Mein" and "Kaash" on Panoramic, "Mann Mein Ujaala" on Kaavish, "Reflection (In Your Eyes)" on Resonance, "Ishaara" on Yuva and "Meant To Be/Chalta Raha" on Musafir.

Penn Masala's music has been popularly and critically acclaimed. "Meri Sapno Ki Rani" and "Aap Jaise Koi" were both featured in American Desi, while a music video for "Chamak Challo" debuted in the Top 10 on Channel [V] India. Both "Chamak Challo" and "Bharat Humko Jaan Se Pyara Hai", a celebration of India's 50th anniversary of independence, brought immediate attention to the group in the fall of 1997, and have been fan favorites ever since. Penn Masala songs have been routinely selected for Varsity Vocals' Best of Collegiate A Cappella CD. "Bharat Humko Jaan Se Pyara Hai" was the first Penn Masala song to be honored. After that, " "Pehchaan" from Pehchaan, "Lovestoned/Ya Ali" from On Detours, "Is Pal Mein" from Panoramic, and "Manwa Laage" from Resonance have all been selected to be on the Best of Collegiate A Cappella CD for their respective years.

In 2012, the group was named one of the five best college a cappella groups in the United States by USA Today and twelve best college a cappella groups by online magazine Her Campus.

== Members ==
Penn Masala is a living, evolving group. Made up of University of Pennsylvania students, the group's membership constantly changes as veteran members graduate and new members enter the group through an audition process. Although the majority of Penn Masala's members are of Indian descent, non-Indian members such as Brian Hong, Sam Levenson, Brendan McManus, Albert Gu, and Nick Chang have been a part of the group. Former members also occasionally perform with the group when they tour different cities.

Penn Masala currently consists of: Aryaman Meswani, Gaurish Gaur, Avik Agarwal, Sauman Das, Aadi Shah, Ram Pantula, Advaith Satish, Nick Chang, Aarav Doshi, Rishabh Tole, Anay Apte, and Jaydon Gollapudi.

=== Alumni ===
Graduation Year	Names
1999	Alekh Dalal, Ankur Gupta, Himanshu Sheth, Naveen Wadhera
2000	Abhijeet Patwardhan, Brian Hong, Budhaditya Bhattacharya, Deep Trivedi, Kunal Bajaj, Mihir Talati, Rishi Patel
2001	Ameesh Shah, Pankaj Kakkar, Sandip Agarwala, Veeral Rathod
2002	Akash Shah, Arpan Punyani, Saurabh Moonat
2003	Gaurav Kapadia, Kalin Agarwal, Rishabh Jain, Sandeep Acharya, Vimal Vora, Vishal Oberoi, Viral Juthani
2004	Indranil Guha, Prateek Sureka, Devang Shah
2005	Adarsh Shah, Ashish Doshi, Prashant Shankar, Shakir Iqbal
2006	Ramnath Vaidyanathan, Samir Amrute, Varun Sureka
2007	Anand Anbalagan, Ankit Agarwal, Jay Patel, Sathvik Tantry, Srikant Rao, Tushar Vashisht
2008	Ameya Phadke, Ankit Shah, Samir Sheth
2009	Anup Bharani, Chethan Mudiyam, Ricky Sharma
2010	Ankit Dhir, Nikhil Marathe, Sagar Bhatt
2011	Bhuwan Vashisht, Dhruv Batura, Manoj Racherla, Sachin Amrute
2012	Bharat Moudgil, Harshil Shukla, Mahesh Murali, Shriram Chauhan, Vinay Rao
2013	Akshat Vaidya, Ram Narayan, Sam Levenson
2014	Akiff Premjee, Varshil Patel, Rohan Murthy
2015	Dilip Rajan, Ashwin Muthiah, Dhruv Maheshwari
2016	Prashant Ramesh, Chetan Khanna, Anil Chitrapu, Aneesh Kanakamedala
2017	Hariharan Ravi, Praveen Rajaguru, Brendan McManus, Pranay Sharma, Kashish Hora
2018	Nikhil Raman, Wrik Sinha, Yamir Tainwala, Vishnu Rachakonda
2019	Atman Panigrahi, Sanjit Chakravarthy, Anant Maheshwari
2020	Shaunak Kulkarni, Anvit Reddy, Anirudh Bikmal, Ajay Vasisht
2021	Kushal Modi, Harsh Meswani, Dev Shaurya Singhal
2022	Aveek Ganguly, Shrivats Kannan, Partha Rao
2023	Saaketh Narayan, Vishvesh Dhar, Albert Gu, Sachit Gali
2024	Venugopal Chillal, Riju Datta, Samarth Nayak
2025	Ajay Kilambi, Raghu Raman, Prateek Adurty

The group also gives special thanks to the following: Santosh Govindaraju, Siddhartha Khosla, Swapnil Shah, Sameer Mungur, Ananda Sen, Vishal Oberoi

== Discography ==
=== Albums ===
- Midnight Oil (2022)
- Musafir (2020)
- Penn Masala, Vol.1 (2018)
- Yuva (2017)
- Resonance (2015)
- Kaavish (2013)
- Panoramic (2011)
- On Detours (2009)
- Pehchaan (2007)
- Out of Stock (2005)
- The Brown Album (2005)
- Soundcheck (2003)
- Aap Jaisa Koi (2001) (from American Desi)
- 11 PM (2001)
- Awaaz (1999)

Midnight Oil (2022)

No.	Title	Length
1.	"Late Night Drive (Intro)"	1:07
2.	"Uptown Funk / Badtameez Dil"	3:36
3.	"Versace On The Floor / Aao Naa"	4:40
4.	"Ragas of Malhar"	4:37
5.	"Taare Zameen Par / Paradise"	5:03
6.	"Lakshya"	3:39
7.	"Blinding Lights / Bol Na Halke"	4:24
8.	"My Future / Yeh Dooriyan / Kalank"	4:53
9.	"Anyone / Hawayein"	4:01
10.	"Teri Mitti"	4:29
11.	"Om Shanti Om / September"	4:30
12.	"Dhoom / Talk Dirty"	3:56
13.	"I Don't Care / Kadhaippoma"	3:36
14.	"Hazy"	3:21
15.	"TikTok Medley (Bonus)"	5:38

Musafir (2020)

No.	Title	Length
1.	"Castle On The Hill / Ilahi"	4:06
2.	"Miss Independent / Ek Ladki Ko Dekha Toh Aisa Laga"	4:18
3.	"Tu Hi Hai / Jaane Kyon Log Pyaar"	3:30
4.	"Ae Watan"	3:47
5.	"Everglow / Kaise Mujhe"	4:54
6.	"Pal / In My Blood"	3:01
7.	"Bulleya / Dusk Till Dawn"	4:54
8.	"When We Were Young / Tera Yaar Hoon Main"	4:06
9.	"Meant To Be / Chalta Raha (Original)"	4:34
10.	"Tu Cheez Badi Hai Mast"	4:07
11.	"Let Me Love You / Suit / High Rated Gabru"	4:33
12.	"Cake By The Ocean / Ghungroo / Stronger"	4:17
13.	"United By Music - Desi Regional Medley"	5:14

Penn Masala, Vol.1 (2018)

No.	Title	Length
1.	"Mast Magan / Iktara"	3:57
2.	"The Udit Narayan Mix"	2:15
3.	"O Saathi / Too Good at Goodbyes"	2:19
4.	"Controlla / Baarish"	3:25
5.	"Attention / Bandook Meri Laila"	2:15
6.	"Havana / Bom Diggy / Main Tera Boyfriend"	2:07
7.	"Shut Up and Dance / Buddhu Sa Mann"	2:21
8.	"The Ten Years Medley"	2:57

Yuva - (2017)

No.	Title	Length
1.	"One Thing / Jeena Jeena"	4:23
2.	"Baar Baar Dekho / Haal Kaisa Hai Janaab Ka"	3:27
3.	"Phir Le Aaya Dil"	5:04
4.	"Ishaara"	4:36
5.	"Tu Hai Ke Nahi / Climax"	4:37
6.	"Photograph / Aayat / Laal Ishq"	5:06
7.	"Agar Tum Saath Ho / Treat You Better"	4:44
8.	"Sau Aasmaan / If I Lose Myself"	4:48
9.	"Humma Humma"	3:48
10.	"Sooraj Dooba Hain / Sugar"	3:53
11.	"The Antakshari Project: Holi"	5:44
12.	"Desi 4Chord Medley"	3:50
13.	"Nashe Si Chadh Gayi / Hymn for the Weekend"	4:17

Resonance - (2015)

No.	Title	Length
1.	"Main Rang Sharbaton Ka - Sunday Morning"	4:40
2.	"Without You - Teri Jhuki Nazar"	4:19
3.	"Manwa Laage (feat. Jonita Gandhi)"	3:54
4.	"Stay - Tere Bina"	4:29
5.	"Tum Hi Ho - Mad World"	4:20
6.	"Reflection (In Your Eyes)"	3:30
7.	"Can't Feel My Face - Rehna Tu"	3:58
8.	"Yun Hi Chala Chal"	5:36
9.	"La La La - Bang Bang"	4:02
10.	"Clocks - Koi Hai Toh Sahee"	3:58
11.	"Tonight (I'm Lovin' You) - Dilliwaali Girlfriend"	3:47

Kaavish - (2013)

No.	Title	Length
1.	"Fix You/Ishq Bina"	4:51
2.	"Rain Bhai Kaari (Maajhi)"	5:34
3.	"Mad/Pee Loon"	4:31
4.	"Sun Zara/U Got It Bad"	3:26
5.	"It Will Rain/Piya O Re Piya"	3:56
6.	"Can You Stand The Rain/Mann Ki Lagan"	3:58
7.	"Tere Warga/Fight For You"	4:48
8.	"Ghanan Ghanan"	4:16
9.	"Tu Aashiqui Hai"	3:45
10.	"Mann Mein Ujjala"	5:34

Panoramic - (2011)

No.	Title	Length
1.	"Remedy/Kabar Nahin"	3:48
2.	"Ajab Si/Here Comes The Sun"	3:17
3.	"Bahara"	3:44
4.	"Viva La Vida/Jashn-e-Bahara"	4:24
5.	"Is Pal Mein"	3:04
6.	"She Will Be Loved/O Re Piya"	4:58
7.	"Kaash"	3:23
8.	"Heartless/Kabhi Kabhi"	4:28
9.	"Dreaming With a Broken Heart/Pehli Nazar Mein"	4:02
10.	"Chaiyya Chaiyya"	4:15
11.	"Down/Desi Girl"	4:21

On Detours - (2009)

No.	Title	Length
1.	"Detours"	2:47
2.	"Over My Head/Kya Mujhe Pyar Hai"	3:45
3.	"Zara Se/With You"	4:12
4.	"Lovestoned/Ya Ali"	4:28
5.	"Ramta Jogi"	3:51
6.	"Because of You/Tu Hi Meri Shab Hai"	3:42
7.	"Aadat/Apologize"	4:30
8.	"What Goes Around...Comes Around"	5:05
9.	"Kal Ka Sapna"	4:31
10.	"Streets/Roobaroo"	4:17
11.	"Yeh Honsla"	4:10
12.	"Distant Places"	4:31

Pehchaan - (2007)

No.	Title	Length
1.	"Neelay Neelay/Only You"	3:52
2.	"Every Breath/Bheegey Hont"	4:10
3.	"Mitwa"	5:12
4.	"Used to Love U/Kangna"	3:13
5.	"Woh Lamhe"	3:50
6.	"Pehchaan"	4:26
7.	"Anytime/Meri Yaad"	4:12
8.	"Main Tanha"	3:46
9.	"Don't Stop/Dosti"	3:53
10.	"Aicha"	3:53
11.	"Dheere Jalna"	4:45
12.	"Aankhon Mein Tu Hai"	2:55

The Brown Album - (2005)

No.	Title	Length
1.	"Back Again"	1:11
2.	"Desert Rose"	3:11
3.	"Saadat Dil Te/Turn Me On"	3:31
4.	"Maa Tujhe Salaam"	4:12
5.	"Aankhon Mein Tu Hai"	2:57
6.	"Walking Away/Kya Kare Kya Na Kare"	5:02
7.	"Dil Kya Kare/Ain't No Sunshine"	2:52
8.	"Wedding Qawwali"	5:08
9.	"Four Seasons/Tu Hi Re"	4:31
10.	"Pachaas Paisa"	4:24
11.	"One/Chalte Chalte"	5:06
12.	"Tere Bin/Water Runs Dry"	5:37
13.	"Main Hoon Na/I'll Be There"	4:19
14.	"Masala Dosa"	0:44
15.	"Nahin Samne"	4:40
