= HealthifyMe =

Indian digital health and wellness company

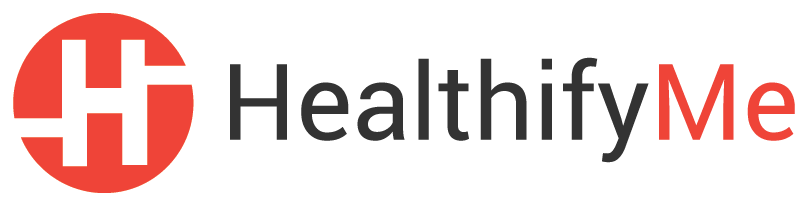
- Type: Private
- Industry: Health; Fitness
- Genre: Health informatics; Physical fitness; Nutritionism
- Founded: January 2012; 14 years ago
- Founders: Tushar Vashisht; Mathew Cherian; Sachin Shenoy
- Headquarters: Bangalore, Karnataka, India
- Area served: Worldwide
- Key people: Tushar Vashisht (CEO); Sachin Shenoy
- Website: www.healthifyme.com

HealthifyMe is an Indian digital health and wellness company, which provides an app with services such as calorie tracking and advice on nutrition and fitness. It is available on the Android and iOS platforms, and can be used with wearable technology such as activity trackers.

The company was founded by Tushar Vashisht, Mathew Cherian and Sachin Shenoy in 2012.

== History ==
=== Early years ===
HealthifyMe was founded in 2012 by the founder and CEO Tushar Vashisht and Mathew Cherian, initially putting together an Excel sheet of foods and their calorie values and then build a software platform around it. The first version of the software was released in 2012. A year after its foundation, Sachin Shenoy joined the company as head of engineering.

The company launched an Android app in 2013, with an iOS app released shortly afterwards. The Android app earned Google Play Store's "Top Developer" badge in 2015, and was named amongst the "Best Apps of 2015".

=== Funding and recognition ===
In May 2015, the company launched a campaign, HealthifyIndia, in collaboration with Godrej Nature's Basket, Manipal Hospitals, Medanta and Apollo Centre, to promote healthy living amongst Indians and create awareness of lifestyle disorders. It was reported that HealthifyMe's website had become the most visited health website in India, with 40 lakh visitors.

In May 2015, electronics manufacturer Micromax invested an undisclosed amount in HealthifyMe. On 17 June 2015, it was announced that HealthifyMe closed its pre-Series A round with an undisclosed amount from a group of individual investors. It then raised $6 million as a part of their Series-A round in April 2016 from IDG Ventures, Inventus Capital Partners & Blume Ventures.

The app continued to be named among "Best Apps - Made in India" in 2016 and 2017. In December 2017, the company received the Google Play "Editor's Choice" award in the Health & Fitness category.

In November 2024, the company closed a $45 million financing round to expand into the United States.

=== Launch of AI nutritionist 'Ria' ===
In late-2017, HealthifyMe launched "Ria", an AI nutritionist which learned from 10 million messages and over 200 million food and workout logs. Ria was announced as the world's first AI-powered virtual nutritionist.

By early-2018, the company had more than one million monthly active users. In February 2018, HealthifyMe raised a Series B funding round of US$12 million led by Sistema Asia Fund and Samsung's AI focussed fund - NEXT (their first investment in India). Atlas Asset Management (Singapore), Dream Incubator (Japan) and existing investors (IDG Ventures, Inventus Capital Partners & Blume Ventures, NB Ventures) also participated in the funding round.

=== Foray into overseas markets ===
In November 2018, HealthifyMe announced that it has raised US$6 million from Innoven Capital and existing investors. It also expanded its operations to Malaysia, having mapped over 900 South East Asian foods, and obtained more than 15,000 subscribers within the first month. The company also announced its plans of expanding to Singapore, Indonesia and the Middle East over the next two quarters. The company expanded its operations to Singapore and Brunei in the fourth quarter.

=== Growth and feature launches ===
In February 2019, it was reported that HealthifyMe had more than 8 million users across all markets. Later in 2019, the company launched "Ria 2.0", including the feature, "Snap", using which users can take a picture of their food and the AI can identify the dish and log the calories, provided the dish is among the 10,000 dishes tracked by it. It also launched "Smart Plans" in which users get a customised diet plan recommendation from Ria.

In January 2020, the company partnered with Swiggy enabling users to order healthy foods from nearby restaurants picked by its nutritionists. In February 2020, the company reported that its revenue had reached ₹100 crore and active user base doubled to 16 million in a year. The company announced its entry into mental wellness segment, with the introduction of "HealthifySense", allowing users the access to counselling. It also announced a pilot with Fitternity to provide access to gyms and fitness studios as well a grocery ordering feature in partnership with Milkbasket in select locations.

In August 2026, US nutrition startup, Berry Street, and HealthifyMe has merged. Founder of Berry Street, Noah Kotlove, and Healthify founder, Tunar Vashisht will act as co-CEOs.

== Product ==
HealthifyMe operates on a freemium model, providing nutritional and fitness advice from nutritionists and fitness coaches to users with premium subscription. The company claims to have access to the world's first and largest Indian food database. It has developed a calorie counter for regional foods and an exercise tracker for logging in physical activities. It also shows the count of proteins, carbohydrates, fats and fibre. The AI-driven digital nutritionist Ria can create personalised diet plans and workout routines. Ria reportedly handles 80% of user queries, and was integrated as an Alexa skill for Amazon Echo speakers and Alexa built-in devices in 2019.

== Partnerships ==
HealthifyMe also works in partnership with various medical institutions such as Medanta, Apollo Hospitals and Manipal Hospitals, with the aim to treat and prevent clinical obesity, diabetes, cardiovascular problems and other lifestyle diseases.

== See also ==
- Google Fit
- Apple Health
