= Scholarship =

Financial aid for a student's education

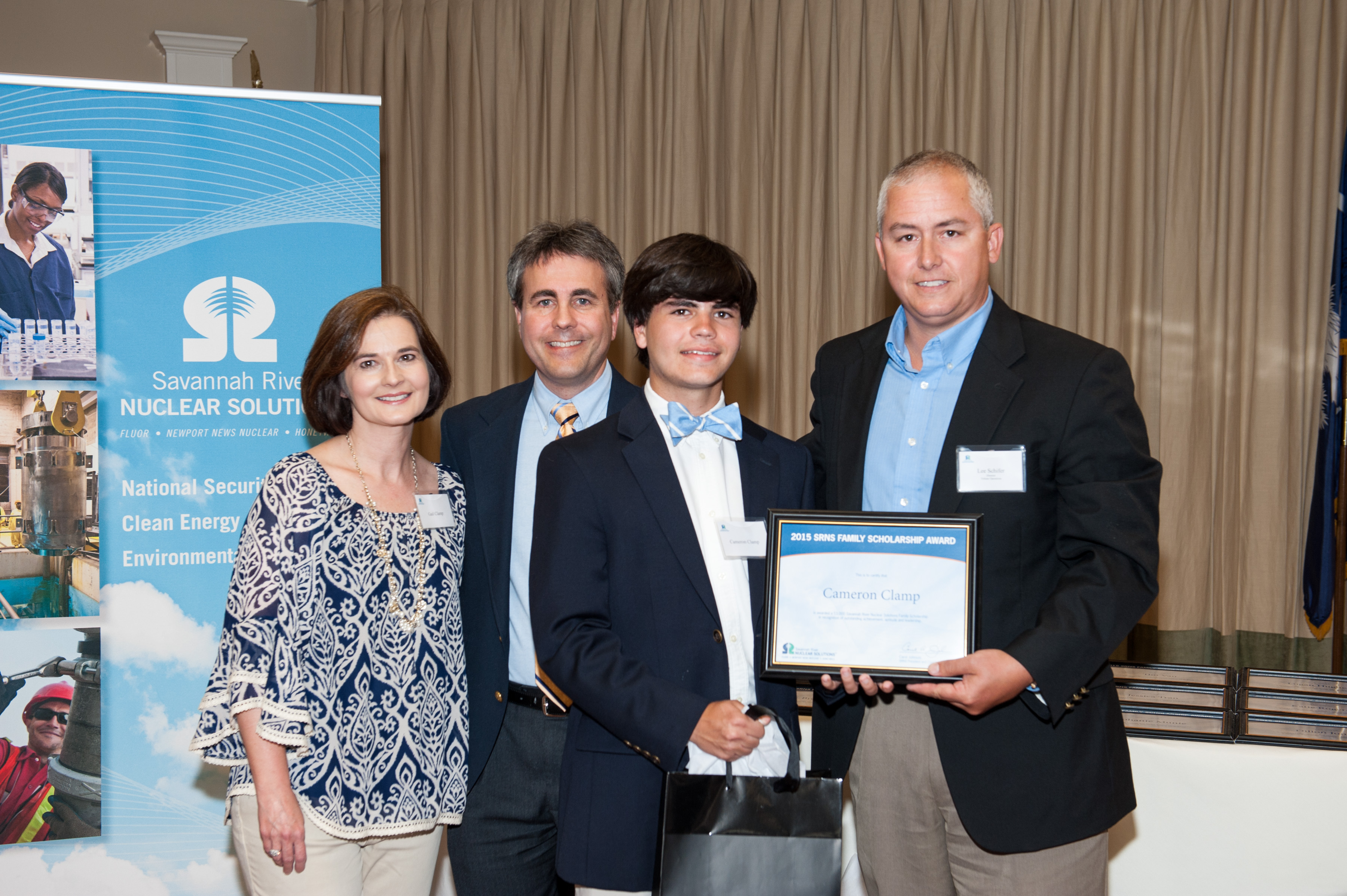
A young man (in a bowtie) receives a scholarship at a ceremony.

A scholarship is a form of financial aid awarded to students for further education. Generally, scholarships are awarded based on a set of criteria such as academic merit, diversity and inclusion, athletic skill, and financial need, research experience or specific professional experience.

Scholarship criteria usually reflect the values and goals of the donor of the award. While scholarship recipients are not required to repay scholarships, the awards may require that the recipient continue to meet certain requirements during their period of support, such as maintaining a minimum grade point average or engaging in a certain activity (e.g., playing on a school sports team for athletic scholarship holders).

Scholarships also range in generosity; some cover partial tuition, while others offer a 'full-ride', covering all tuition, accommodation, housing and others.

Historically, scholarships originated as acts of religious and philanthropic charity in medieval Europe before evolving into institutional tools of social mobility and national development. From early support offered at universities such as the University of Bologna and Harvard University to the standardized merit-based aid of the 20th century, scholarships reflect evolving educational priorities.

In recent decades, scholarships have also become vital to public policy. They are increasingly used by governments and organizations to promote educational equity, economic development, and poverty alleviation. International frameworks such as the United Nations Sustainable Development Goal 4 note the key role of scholarships in expanding educational access for disadvantaged learners to meet national and global development goals. At the same time, rising enrollment and reduced public funding has increased reliance on donor-supported scholarships and cost-sharing models, which further position scholarships as essential mechanisms in offsetting the burden of educational expenses.

Some prestigious, highly competitive scholarships are well-known even outside the academic community, such as Fulbright Scholarship and the Rhodes Scholarships at the graduate level, and the Robertson, Morehead-Cain and Jefferson Scholarships at the undergraduate level.

== Scholarships vs. grants ==
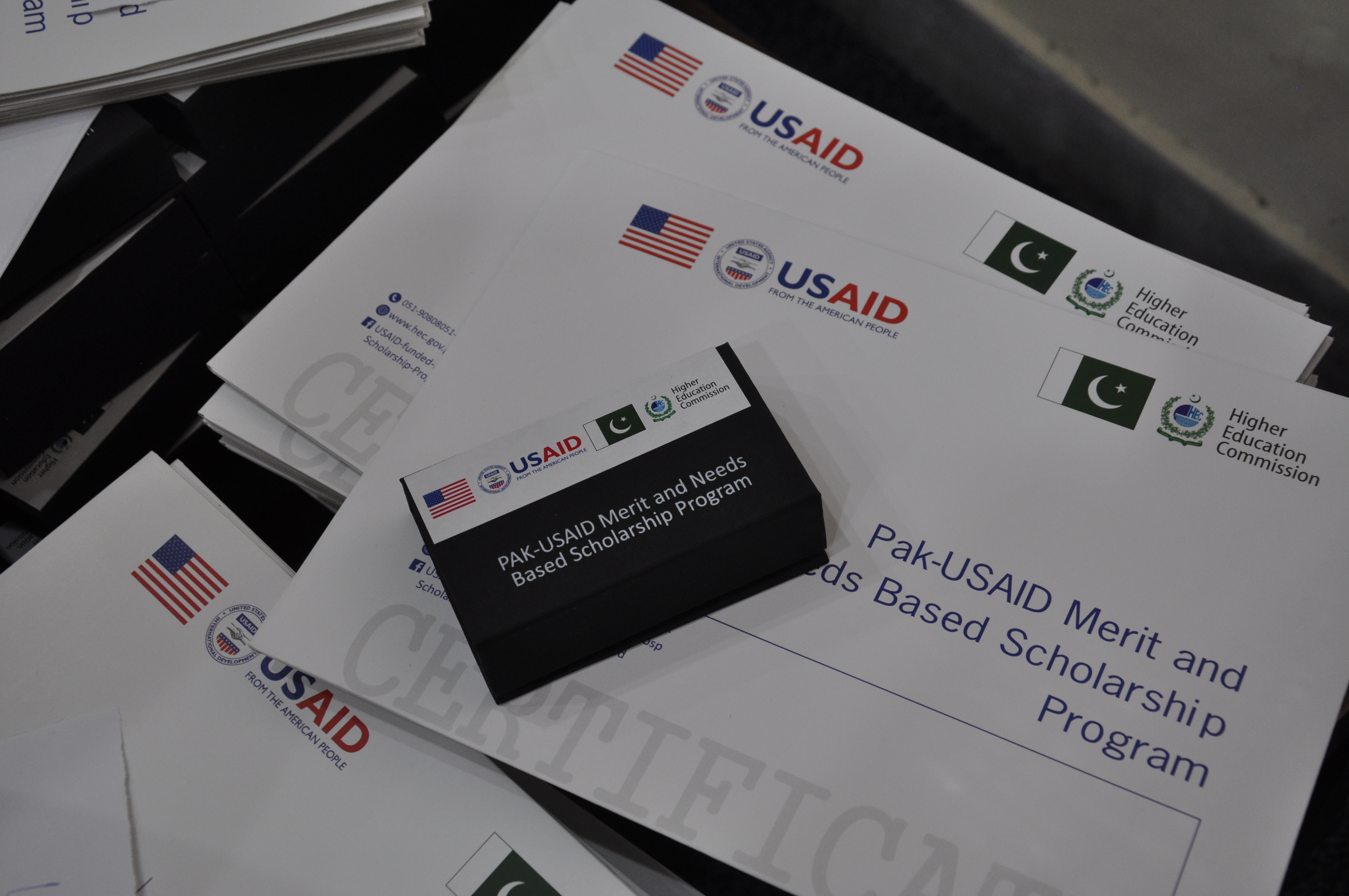
US Aid scholarship certificates

While the terms scholarship and grant are frequently used interchangeably, they are distinctly different. Where grants are offered based exclusively on financial need, scholarships may have a financial need component but rely on other criteria as well.

- Academic scholarships typically use a minimum grade-point average or standardized test score such as the ACT or SAT to narrow down awardees.
- Athletic scholarships are generally based on athletic performance of a student and used as a tool to recruit high-performing athletes for their school's athletic teams.
- Merit scholarships can be based on a number of criteria, including performance in a particular school subject or club participation or community service.

A federal Pell Grant can be awarded to someone planning to receive their undergraduate degree and is solely based on their financial needs.

== Types ==
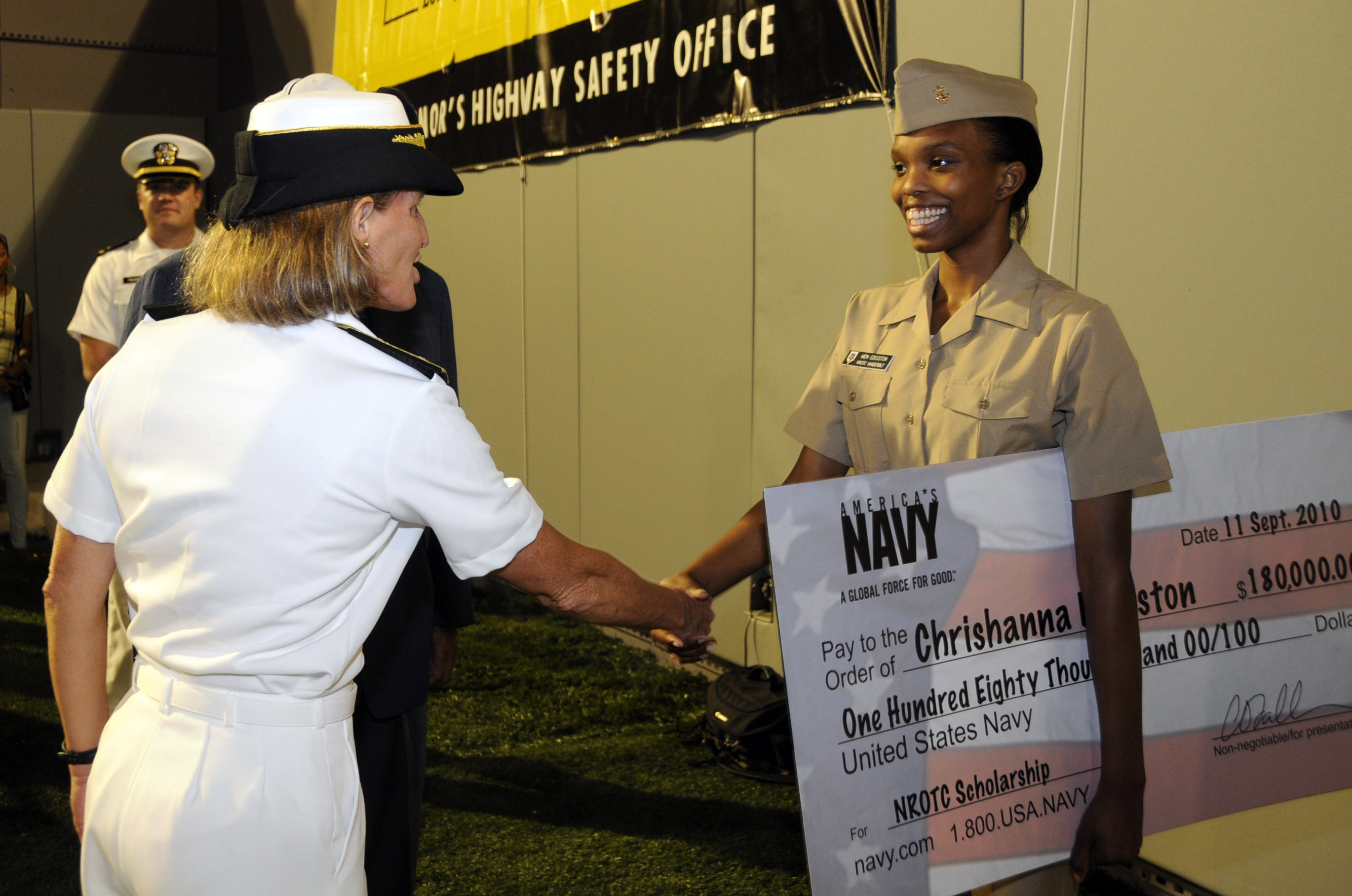
A Navy Rear Admiral presents a Midshipman with a ceremonial cheque symbolizing her $180,000 Navy Reserve Officers Training Candidate scholarship.

The most common scholarships may be classified as:

- Merit-based: These awards are based on a student's academic, artistic, athletic, or other abilities, and often a factor in an applicant's extracurricular activities and community service record. Most such merit-based scholarships are paid directly by the institution the student attends, rather than issued directly to the student.
- Need-based: Some private need-based awards are confusingly called scholarships, and require the results of a FAFSA (the family's expected family contribution). However, scholarships are often merit-based, while grants tend to be need-based.
- Student-specific: These are scholarships for which applicants qualify on student-specific factors.
- Group-specific: Scholarships exclusive to a protected group such as based on gender, race, sexual orientation, or religion. These can be viewed as violating United States anti-discrimination law.
- Career-specific: These are scholarships a college or university awards to students who plan to pursue a specific field of study. Often, the most generous awards go to students who pursue careers in high-need areas, such as education or nursing. Many schools in the United States give future nurses full scholarships to enter the field, especially if the student intends to work in a high-need community.
- College-specific: College-specific scholarships are offered by individual colleges and universities to highly qualified applicants. These scholarships are given on the basis of academic and personal achievement. Some scholarships have a "bond" requirement. Recipients may be required to work for a particular employer for a specified period of time or to work in rural or remote areas; otherwise, they may be required to repay the value of the support they received from the scholarship. This is particularly the case with education and nursing scholarships for people prepared to work in rural and remote areas. The programs offered by the uniformed services of the United States (Army, Navy, Marine Corps, Air Force, Coast Guard, National Oceanic and Atmospheric Administration Commissioned Officer Corps, and Public Health Service Commissioned Corps) sometimes resemble such scholarships.
- Athletic: Awarded to students with exceptional skill in a sport. Often this is so that the student will be available to attend the school or college and play the sport on their team, although in some countries government funded sports scholarships are available, allowing scholarship holders to train for international representation. School-based athletics scholarships can be controversial, as some believe that awarding scholarship money for athletic rather than academic or intellectual purposes is not in the institution's best interest.
- Brand: These scholarships are sponsored by a corporation that is trying to gain attention to their brand, or a cause. Sometimes these scholarships are referred to as branded scholarships. The Miss America beauty pageant is a famous example of a brand scholarship.
- Creative contest: These scholarships are awarded to students based on a creative submission. Contest scholarships are also called mini project-based scholarships, where students can submit entries based on unique and innovative ideas.
- "Last dollar": can be provided by private and government-based institutions, and are intended to cover the remaining fees charged to a student after the various grants are taken into account. To prohibit institutions from taking last dollar scholarships into account, and thereby removing other sources of funding, these scholarships are not offered until after financial aid has been offered in the form of a letter. Furthermore, last dollar scholarships may require families to have filed taxes for the most recent year, received their other sources of financial aid, and not yet received loans.
- Open: a scholarship open to any applicant.

== History ==
=== Origins in medieval Europe ===
One of the earliest examples of organized financial support for students is at the oldest operating university, the University of Bologna, in the 12th century. There, students formed associations called nations based on their geographic origins and pooled resources in "loan chests" to help one another pay off debts and educational expenses. The origins of modern scholarships trace back to medieval Europe in the 13th and 14th centuries, where they took the form of charitable patronage. Initially, financial support for students was provided as a gift between wealthy families, with later funding extended to low-income students as acts of piety, penance, or mercy. The ethos of supporting students was rooted in Christian teachings that emphasized care of the poor and the promotion of pious learning.

=== Colonial era and early philanthropy ===
European philanthropic traditions continued as institutions of higher education emerged in the colonies in North America. Wealthy colonists held philanthropic roles in the sponsorship and patronage of grade schools and higher learning institutions. In 1643, Lady Anne Radcliffe Mowlson donated £100 to Harvard College to aid poor students in their pursuit of education, marking one of the first formal scholarship endowments in the United States. This set the precedent for philanthropic scholarship at all levels of education.

=== Institutional aid ===
In 1838, Harvard University created the Harvard Loan Program, one of the first institutional loan programs. It provided zero-interest loans to students unable to afford tuition. This model expanded across higher learning institutions to help students gain access to education through charitable lending. The 19th century also saw a broader emphasis on civic virtue and meritocratic ideals. Financial aid became aligned with the belief that supporting students would foster an educated citizenry and national development.

=== Federal expansion and modernization of aid ===
The introduction of standardized testing became a turning point for scholarship distribution. American universities began using standardized tests such as the Scholastic Aptitude Test (SAT) in the late 1920s, with Harvard adopting it in 1934 to expand scholarship eligibility to identify talented students for scholarship funding, promoting merit-based aid rather than need-based aid. Following World War II, the U.S. passed the Servicemen's Readjustment Act of 1944 (G.I. Bill), which dramatically expanded access to education through government scholarships and loans for veterans. This development marked a shift toward greater governmental responsibility in financing and coordinating higher education.

== Public policy ==
Scholarships have increasingly been recognized by governments and international organizations as tools for achieving development objectives, poverty alleviation, and promoting equitable access to education. Higher education supported through scholarships has been described as an "engine of development" that fosters industrialization, economic growth, and the training of skilled professionals across sectors.

=== United Nations Sustainable Development Goal Target 4.b ===
United Nations Sustainable Development Goal 4

The United Nations Sustainable Development Goal 4, Quality Education, emphasizes inclusive and equitable quality education and lifelong learning opportunities. Target 4.b specifically calls for the expansion of global scholarships available to students from developing countries, particularly in higher education, technical and vocational education and training, and STEM education. UNESCO's Incheon Declaration and Framework for Action for the implementation of SDG 4 describes scholarships as a means to promote international knowledge exchange and improve access for marginalized learners. In 2010, scholarships accounted for a quarter of total educational aid, averaging $3.2 billion USD annually. UNESCO's 2002 analysis on financing education found that beyond individual benefits, equitable scholarship distribution contributes to broader economic and social returns, including increased productivity, civic engagement, and national capacity-building.

=== Cost-sharing of higher education ===
At the start of the 21st century, higher education faced unprecedented demand from individuals seeking upward economic mobility and from governments pursuing national development. However, rising enrollment and limited public budgets created financial pressures across education systems. Governments also faced competing social priorities, contributing to reduced state funding and a growing reliance on non-governmental revenue sources for educational access.

In this context, some policymakers argue that meeting the increasing demands of secondary and post-secondary education requires greater cost-sharing by students and their families. Educator Donald Bruce Johnstone describes cost sharing as the distribution of educational expenses among governments, parents, students, and donors. This shift often involved the introduction of user fees, particularly in higher education where individual returns are highest, alongside increased reliance on donor-supported financing. As tuition fees rose and public subsidies declined education systems transitioned from state-dominated financing to multi-source funding, relying on donations, fundraising, scholarships, and contributions from private and civil society actors. Other policy makers and experts, however, caution that these measures may restrict access for poorer households and deepen existing inequalities.

Scholarships maintain an essential role in this new policy environment. As public subsidies decline, scholarship programs supported by institutions, international donors, and philanthropic groups have become central to preserving access to education for students from disadvantaged backgrounds. While cost sharing has allowed some higher education institutions to expand enrollment, it has also reinforced the function of scholarships as essential tools for addressing access gaps left by declining public investment and offsetting the rising costs borne by students and their families.

== Notable scholarships ==
=== Name of scholarship with institution and/or sponsoring organisation ===
- ASEAN Scholarships: Government of Singapore
- Chevening Scholarship: Foreign & Commonwealth Office (UK)
- China Scholarship Council Scholarship: Government of China
- Commonwealth Scholarship: Commonwealth governments
- Coca-Cola Scholarship: the Coca-Cola Company
- Endeavour Awards: Government of Australia
- Erasmus Mundus: European Union
- Fulbright Scholarship
- Gates Cambridge Scholarship: Bill & Melinda Gates Foundation; University of Cambridge
- Holtzer Fellowship: Government of Germany, Harvard University
- Ibrahim Scholarships: Mo Ibrahim Foundation
- Indonesia Endowment Fund for Education/LPDP Scholarship: Government of Indonesia
- Jardine Scholarship: Jardine Matheson; Universities of Oxford and Cambridge
- King's Scholarship: Government of Thailand
- Knight-Hennessy Scholars: Stanford University
- Marshall Scholarship: UK universities
- Mitchell Scholarship: US-Ireland Alliance
- Monbukagakushō Scholarship: Government of Japan
- Morehead-Cain Scholarship: University of North Carolina
- Foundation Scholarship: Trinity College Dublin
- Rhodes Scholarship: University of Oxford
- Schwarzman Scholars: Tsinghua University
- National Level Common Entrance Examination: Edvizo

== See also ==
- Bursary
- Free education
- Exhibition
- Fellowship (financial)
- Right to education
- Scholarships in Korea
- Scholarships in the United States
- Scholarships in Taiwan
- School voucher
