= Bina Sharif =

Bina Sharif is an American playwright, actress, director, performer and a visual artist. She has written, directed and performed over 30 plays produced in USA, Pakistan and Europe.

Her most recent work is the full-length play "My Ancestor's House" by Ruttledge Press and taught in many universities. The follow-up of "My Ancestor's House" is a play called "Another Journey Home/Eight Dialogues in a Mirror Cracked" was produced in 2010 in NYC and Pakistan. Her most notable work, the highly acclaimed, "Afghan Woman," opened in NYC in 2002 and was performed in UK, Pakistan, Hawaii, Belgium, and is now translated in Arabic. Sharif performed Afghan Woman and excerpts from many of her other plays at universities such as Princeton, Wellesley College, University of Pennsylvania, Ohio State University, Denver, Colorado, Champaign, Illinois, Toronto, Temple University, Montclair University, Sacramento, California, and Prestigious Islamabad Club Pakistan. In March 2016, the University of South Florida honored Bina Sharif for 30 plays in 30 years.

She is a Joseph Jefferson award nominee actress from Chicago's Goodman Theater. Sharif is 10 times award winner by Jerome Foundation, two time New York State Council of the Arts, Franklin Furnace award and the best performer award at a gay and lesbian theater festival. As an actress, Sharif has worked with Vanessa Redgrave, Fernando Arrabal, Brían Francis O'Byrne, Lee Breuer, Robert Patrick, Charles Busch, Crystal Field, Irene Fornes, Sarah Schulman, Kevin Martin, Jane Adams and Todd Solandz. Along with directing her own work, she also directed a one-man show, "A Touch of the Poe", featuring Kevin Mitchell Martin based on Edgar Allen Poe's life and works at the Edinburgh, Scotland Fringe Festival for which they were awarded The Pick of the Fringe.

Sharif has been a theater critic for the last 20 years, co-hosting HI DRAMA and is the editor and publisher for the blog ArtsInternational and maintains a website with her writing titled Stream of Consciousness of Singing Birds. Sharif is also a visual artist and she's been drawing and painting for the last 20 years. Her work has been exhibited in group shows at Theater for the New City Art Gallery and recently had her first solo exhibit at Theresa Byrnes Gallery, TBG Gallery in the East Village, Manhattan. Her 31st play will be staged in New York at The Theater for the New City November 2016. She recently completed her 32nd play, which is a one-woman play titled "Sorrow in the Time of Isis" and is being considered for production.

Sharif holds an MD degree from Pakistan and a master's degree in Public health from Johns Hopkins University.
