= John Richard Anthony Pearson =

British chemical engineer

- Born: 18 September 1930 (age 95)
- Education: Bedford Modern School
- Alma mater: Trinity College, Cambridge; Harvard University
- Known for: Fluid mechanics
- Spouse: Emma Margaret Anderson
- Scientific career
- Institutions: University of Cambridge, Imperial College London

John Richard Anthony Pearson FRS FIMMM MIChemE (born 18 September 1930) is a Scientific Consultant at Schlumberger Cambridge Research and Chairman of the Pearson Publishing Group since 1993.

== Early life ==
Pearson was born in Cairo on 18 September 1930 and educated at Bedford Modern School, Trinity College Cambridge and Harvard University.

== Career ==
Pearson was Assistant Director of Research in the Department of Chemical Engineering at the University of Cambridge (1960–73), Director of Studies in Mathematics and a Fellow of Trinity Hall, Cambridge (1961–73) and Professor of Chemical Engineering at Imperial College London (1973–82). In 1975 Pearson became a lecturer at the University of Michigan and between 1978 and 1979 a Fairchild Scholar at the CIT, later a Professor of the University of Minnesota.

Pearson held the position of Visiting Professor at Princeton University (1967), the University of Wisconsin (1967), Rice University (1969), Massachusetts Institute of Technology (1973–76), the University of Sydney (1982) and the University of Louvain (1994–95). He is an Honorary Professorial Fellow of the University of Wales and the University of Birmingham.

== Honours ==
In 1980, Pearson was elected a member of the National Academy of Engineering for pioneering contributions to fluid mechanics, interfacial phenomena, and the modeling of polymer flows.

Pearson was made a Fellow of the Royal Society in 2005. Commenting on the Fellowship, the University of Cambridge stated that he had ‘pioneered developments in fluid mechanics, including the first asymptotic analysis of viscous flow past a cylinder, a rapid-distortion theory of turbulence and studies of Marangoni convection, and the instability of flow under rollers’.
