= Journal of Transnational American Studies =

- Discipline: American studies
- Language: English
- Edited by: Nina Morgan

Publication details
- History: 2009–present
- Publisher: eScholarship Publishing University of California (United States)
- Frequency: annually
- Open access: Yes
- License: Creative Commons Attribution 4.0

Standard abbreviations
- ISO 4: J. Transnatl. Am. Stud.

Indexing
- ISSN: 1940-0764
- OCLC no.: 300068655

Links
- Journal homepage

Journal of Transnational American Studies is a peer-reviewed open access scholarly journal publishing original research in the field of American studies. It is published from the Department of English at the University of California, Santa Barbara. The current editor-in-chief is Alfred Hornung. The Library of Congress has selected the journal for inclusion in its permanent archive of electronic publications.

== Abstracting and indexing ==
The journal is abstracted and indexed in:

- Scopus
- DOAJ
- MLA Bibliography
- The American Studies Journals Directory
