= James Haward Taylor =

James Haward Taylor FRS (24 February 1909;–25 January 1968) was a British geologist who served as president of the Mineralogical Society of Great Britain and Ireland from 1963 to 1965.

He was educated at Clifton College, King's College London (BSc with 1st Class Hons, AKC, Jelf Medal (Natural Science)), Harvard University (AM, 1934), and the University of London (PhD, 1936).

He was Professor of Geology at King's College London. He was made a Fellow of the Royal Society in 1960.
