= Bernard Sendall =

British writer (1913–1996)

Bernard Charles Sendall (30 April 1913 - 25 May 1996) was a Civil Servant and an executive member of the British Independent Television Authority (ITA). However, he is probably best known as the author of the first two books in the six-volume Independent Television in Britain series, widely regarded as the definitive history of the first 37 years of the ITV service.

== Early life ==
Sendall grew up in the town of Worcester where he attended the Royal Grammar School. He studied Modern History at Magdalen College, Oxford, graduating with a first class degree at the age of 20. After leaving Oxford, he studied as a postgraduate at Harvard University.

== Civil Service ==
Sendall joined the British Civil Service in 1935 and from 1941 to 1945 was Private Secretary to Brendan Bracken, the Minister of Information during the Second World War. After the war, the defunct Ministry of Information was re-established as the Central Office of Information. Sendall helped with the transition and became the Central Office's first Controller between 1946 and 1949. He then went on to act as Controller of the Festival of Britain until 1951 a job for which he was honoured with the CBE in 1952.

== Television ==
In 1955, Sendall joined the Independent Television Authority, initially as Secretary but later the deputy to the Director-General, Sir Robert Fraser. (Fraser, like Sendall, was one of several senior figures in Independent Television who had previously worked in the information services.) He remained in the post throughout the Authority's metamorphosis into the Independent Broadcasting Authority in 1972 and eventually retired in 1977. On retirement, he was awarded the Royal Television Society gold medal for his durable contribution to television.

Sendall wrote and published the first two volumes of Independent Television in Britain, the official history of ITV in 1982 and 1983 respectively. The series was subsequently continued by other writers.
