= Bombay Dreams (film) =

2004 film by Lena Koppel

Poster.

Bombay Dreams is a Swedish comedy film from 2004.

== Plot ==
Ebba is adopted from India she is wondering who her real mom is. One day she finds a letter in a wardrobe from her biological mother, she decides to travel to India without the knowledge of her parents home in Sweden.

=== Cast ===
- Gayathri Mudigonda - Ebba / Shivana
- Nadine Kirschon - Camilla
- Sissela Kyle - Anita
- Peter Dalle - Camillas pappa
- Viktor Källander - Erik
- Dolly Minhas - Dr. Nira Kumar, Ebba's biological mother
- Amit P. Pandey - Rupesh
- Linn Staberg - Katja
- Peter Sjöberg - Rikard

== Awards ==
Nadine Kirschon won Best Actress 2005 at the GAFFA - International Film Festival for Young People in Austria in 2005 for her role in Bombay Dreams.
