= Sheetal Sheth =

American actress

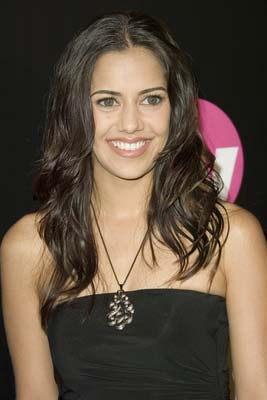
- Sheth in January 2012
- Born: Sheetal Sheth; June 24, 1976 (age 50); Phillipsburg, New Jersey, U.S.,
- Education: New York University Tisch School of the Arts
- Occupations: Actress, author, producer
- Years active: 1999–present
- Spouse: Neil Mody (m. 2013)
- Children: 2
- Website: sheetalsheth.com

Sheetal Sheth (/ˈʃiːθəl ˈʃɛθ/) is an American actress, author, producer, and activist.

As an actress, she is known for starring opposite Albert Brooks in Looking for Comedy in the Muslim World. She debuted in the film ABCD and has appeared in the films American Chai, I Can't Think Straight, and The World Unseen.

Sheth was the first Indian American to appear in Maxim magazine. She has published op-eds in CNN, The Daily Beast, and Thrive Global. She is also the author of a series of picture books, beginning with the book Always Anjali.

== Early life and education ==
Sheth was born on June 24, 1976, in Trenton, New Jersey. She is a first-generation Gujarati Indian American. Her parents immigrated to the United States from Gujarat, India in 1972.

Although academics were her priority, Sheth also studied multicultural dance and was involved in basketball. Her parents were devout Jains, but they enrolled Sheth in the local Catholic school, which she attended until age 12 when her family moved to Trenton.

Sheth attended Liberty High School in Bethlehem, Pennsylvania, where she was involved in student government, serving on the student advisory board. She received the student government award for her contribution to the school, and was one of two students invited to speak at her commencement. While in high school, Sheth discovered her passion for acting and was accepted to the New York University Tisch School of the Arts.

At Tisch, Sheth studied classic literature, and some of her favorite works included Antigone and The Crucible. She also trained in method acting at the Lee Strasberg Theatre and Film Institute. She spent a summer abroad in Amsterdam as part of the intensive International Theatre Workshop, studying under acting teachers such as Kristin Linklater. Sheth was selected to participate in the Tisch Scholars Program. After graduating from Tisch with honors, Sheth continued her studies. In New York, she studied with Wynn Handman, a founder of The American Place Theatre. In Los Angeles, she attended weekly classes with acting instructor Milton Katselas until he died in 2008.

== Career ==
=== 1999–2005 ===
Sheth made her film debut as the lead in the 1999 film ABCD, starring opposite Aasif Mandvi and Faran Tahir. The film won Best Indie Feature at the Houston film festival and received critical acclaim from the likes of The Hollywood Reporter and Rolling Stone. Sheth was widely praised for her performance. Both the film and Sheth's character stirred considerable controversy. "But," Sheth responded, "that is exactly the kind of character I like to play. I want to tell the kinds of stories that people have a strong reaction to, positive or negative. It means it has touched them in some way and then I have done my job."

In 2001, Sheth played a dancer in American Chai. The film won the Audience Award at the 2001 Slamdance Film Festival, with the New York Post describing it as a "slight but sweet film." Sheth went on to perform in a variety of roles in independent film and on network television, including the lead in the film Wings of Hope, for which she won Best Actress at Cinevue Film Festival.

=== 2005–2010 ===
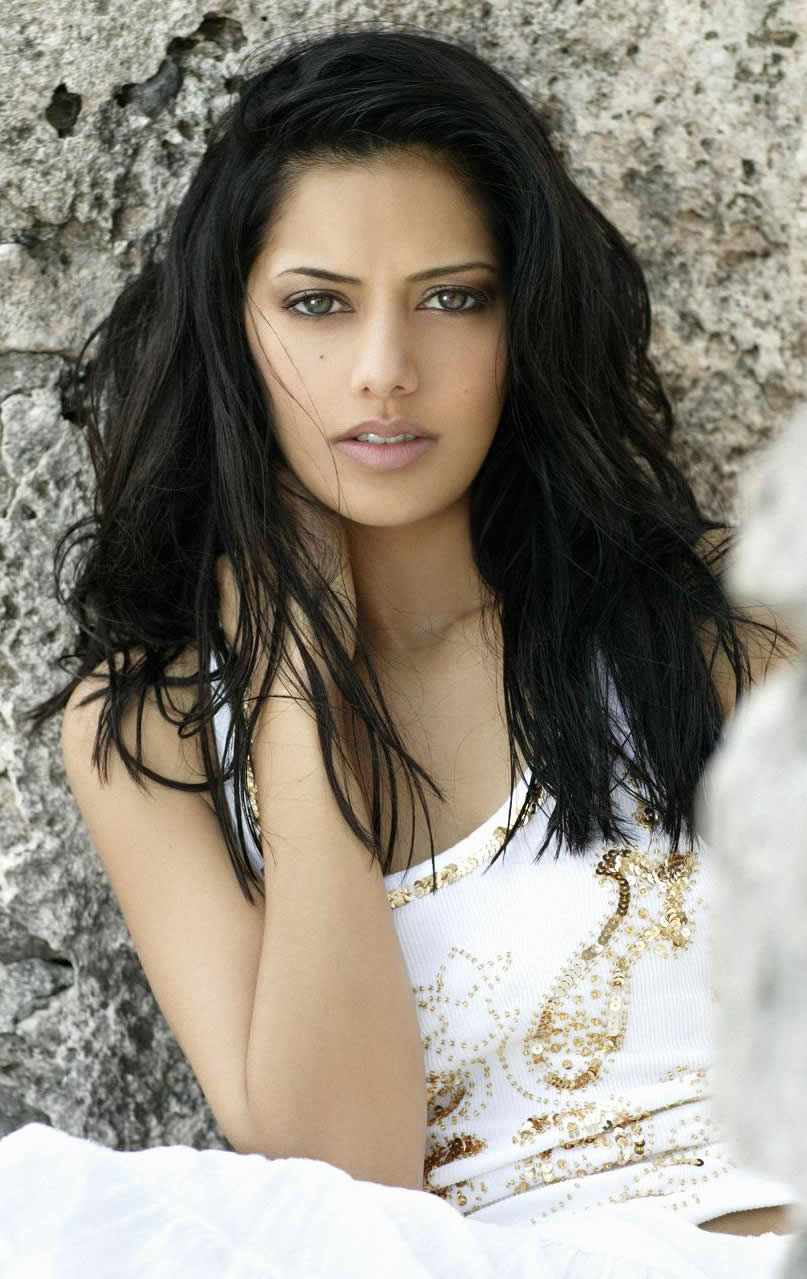
Sheth on cover of CHI magazine in Summer 2005

In 2005, Sheth starred as Maya opposite Albert Brooks in Brooks' film Looking for Comedy in the Muslim World. Brooks conducted an extensive international search for the ideal actor to portray Maya, and says of Sheth, "Once I came across her, I watched everything that I could. I didn't care to look at anybody else…I just knew I had to put her in the film." The film was shot on location in Delhi and Agra, India. Sony Pictures Entertainment originally carried the film, but Brooks parted ways with them when he refused Sony's demand to remove the word "Muslim" from the title. The film was picked up and ultimately released by Warner Independent Pictures.

Following her success in Looking for Comedy in the Muslim World, Sheth appeared in the recurring role of Martina in the NBC TV series The Singles Table, starring opposite Alicia Silverstone and John Cho. Six episodes were shot, but the series never aired. She also performed in the ensemble The Trouble With Romance and starred in the thriller First Fear opposite Sean Patrick Flanery.

Sheth's work brought her to the attention of the award-winning writer and director Shamim Sarif. Sheth starred opposite Lisa Ray in two lesbian themed films, I Can't Think Straight and The World Unseen, both written and directed by Sarif. I Can't Think Straight won more than ten Best Feature awards at film festivals around the world. The World Unseen premiered at the Toronto International Film Festival and went on to win four Best Feature awards internationally. The World Unseen, which was shot on location in South Africa, also swept the 2008 South African Film and Television Awards, winning eleven SAFTA's (South Africa's equivalent to the Oscars). Sheth won three Best Actress awards for her performance in The World Unseen.

=== 2010–present ===
Sheth went on to perform in Why Am I Doing This and starred in Stalemate opposite Josh Randall and Burgess Jenkins, for which she was nominated for Best Actress at the 2011 Staten Island Film Festival. She guest starred in the popular television shows Nip/Tuck, Royal Pains, and NCIS: Los Angeles, and provided the voices for Sumi and Shark in the animated feature film Johnny Bravo Goes to Bollywood, based on Cartoon Network's popular animated television series Johnny Bravo.

In 2011, Sheth starred opposite Mercedes Masöhn and Angela Zahra in Three Veils, which portrays three Middle Eastern women living in the United States. Even before it was released the film sparked intense controversy, and death threats were made against those involved with the production of the film. Three Veils has won numerous Best Feature awards at film festivals internationally.

In 2012, Sheth continued to choose a variety of challenging roles in independent films. She starred opposite Lynn Chen and Parry Shen in Yes, We're Open, a sex comedy exploring open relationships. She again paired with Chen in Nice Girls Crew, which also stars Michelle Krusiec, and starred in The Wisdom Tree, a film blending science fiction, new age, and mysticism. Sheth stepped behind the camera to co-produce Reign, a short film dramatizing how miscommunication can lead to war. She also starred in the film, which was written and directed by Kimberly Jentzen and shot by Oscar-nominated Cinematographer Jack Green. Reign received the Award of Merit from Best Shorts.

Sheth began her career at a time when few South Asians and very few Indian American women were making their living as actors. Still, she was surprised to find herself a pioneer. Nothing in her experience, education or personal outlook had prepared her for the role her ethnicity would play in casting decisions. She was frequently expected to change her name to something "more American," and was even denied representation when she chose to perform under her own name.

== Other projects ==
Sheth was selected as the spokesperson for CHI haircare products and represented Reebok's New York sneaker in their 2008 international Freestyle campaign. She was also the first Indian American to appear in Maxim magazine. CHI says of Sheth, "Grace, artistry, passion and the most compelling elements of every culture – that's the essence of Sheth."

=== Humanitarian causes ===
While at New York University, Sheth was selected to be a part of AmeriCorps, a division of the Corporation for National and Community Service created by U.S. President Bill Clinton. Through AmeriCorps, she worked at an inner-city high school, developing progressive lesson plans and activities, tutoring, and dealing with conflict resolution.

She participates in Big Brothers Big Sisters of Greater Los Angeles as a Big Sister, and also supports and promotes Women's Voices Now, an organization which encourage communities that are under-represented in American media, to make their voices heard.

== Personal life ==
Sheth married Neil Mody in 2013. In June 2019, Sheth revealed that she was diagnosed with breast cancer.

== Awards ==
Winner, Best Actress, Wings Of Hope, Cinevue Film Festival, 2003
Winner, Best Actress, The World Unseen, Gran Canaria Film Festival, Spain, 2009
Winner, Best Actress, The World Unseen, Festival del Mar, Ibiza 2009
Winner, Best Leading Performance, The World Unseen, Out Takes Film Festival, Dallas 2009

== Filmography ==
Year	Title	Role	Notes
1999	ABCD	Nina Mehta	Film debut role
2001	American Chai	Maya	
2001	The Princess and the Marine	Layla	Television film
2001	A Pocket Full of Dreams	Sanjana	
2001	Wings of Hope	Kaajal Verma	
2003	The Agency	Layla - Jamar Akil's Sister	Episode: "An Isolated Incident"
2003	Beat Cops	Gwen Lampoor	Television film
2003	The Proud Family	Radhika (voice)	Episode: "Culture Shock"
2004	Strong Medicine	Shaheena	Episode: "Ears, Ho's & Threat"
2004	Indian Cowboy	Sapna	
2005	Line of Fire	Fathima	Episode: "This Land Is Your Land"
2005	Dancing in Twilight	Nicole	
2005	Looking for Comedy in the Muslim World	Maya	
2007	The Singles Table	Martina	3 episodes
2007	The Trouble with Romance	Nicole	
2007	First Fear	Maya	
2008	I Can't Think Straight	Leyla	
2008	The World Unseen	Amina Harjan	
2009	Why Am I Doing This?	Nira	
2010	StaleMate	Kayleigh	
2010	Nip/Tuck	Aria	Episode: "Dan Daly"
2011	Three Veils	Nikki	
2011	Being Bin Laden	Nabeelah	Television film
2011	Royal Pains	Raina Saluja	Episode: "A Little Art, A Little Science"
2011	NCIS: Los Angeles	Shari Al-Kousa	Episode: "Deadline"
2011	Johnny Bravo Goes to Bollywood	Sumi - Shark (voice)	Television film
2012	Yes, We're Open	Elena	
2012-2013	Nice Girls Crew	Leena	10 episodes
2012-2013	Lips	Rousaura	2 episodes
2012	Reign	Fadwa	Short film Also producer
2012	Brickleberry	Dottie (voice)	Episode: "Hello Dottie"
2013	The Wisdom Tree	Dr. Trisha Rao	
2013	Blue Bloods	Isabelle Nassar	Episode: "Warriors"
2014	Futurestates	Evelyn Malik Cammie Malik	2 episodes
2014	Go North	Riya	Short film
2016	Family Guy	Padma (voice) Tapeworm (voice)	Episode: "Road to India"
2020	I'll Meet You There	Shonali	
