= American Chai =

2001 film by Anurag Mehta

- Directed by: Anurag Mehta
- Written by: Anurag Mehta
- Screenplay by: Anurag Mehta
- Starring: Aalok Mehta; Aasif Mandvi; Paresh Rawal; Sheetal Sheth
- Distributed by: Dream Merchant Pictures Fusion Films
- Release dates: 25 January 2001 (Slamdance Film Festival); 5 April 2002
- Running time: 92 minutes
- Country: United States
- Language: English

American Chai is a 2001 American comedy-drama film written and directed by Indian American director Anurag Mehta. His brother, Aalok Mehta, played the starring role opposite Sheetal Sheth, who had previously starred in the similar genre film ABCD. The film also had a minor role played by Paresh Rawal.

The film deals with an Indian American student who wants to pursue his love of music over the more "typical" academic endeavors of Indian Americans (e.g., medicine, engineering, and law).

The film won the Audience Award at the 2001 Slamdance Film Festival, with the New York Post describing it as a "slight but sweet film".

== Premise ==
Sureel is a first generation Indian American college graduating senior music major whose controlling father still believes that he is pre-med. His desires in life conflict with both his family's traditional values, and the usual Indian way of assimilating into the United States by becoming a doctor or engineer. As graduation approaches, he has an opportunity to be nationally recognized for his music which will simplify telling his father the truth.

== Cast ==
- Aalok Mehta as Sureel
- Sheetal Sheth as Maya
- Aasif Mandvi as Engineering Sam
- Josh Ackrman as Toby
- Ajay Naidu as Hari
- Paresh Rawal as Sureel's Dad
- Bharti Desai as Sureel's Mom
- Akshay Oberoi as Neel
- Rajiv Reddy as Young Sureel
- Jamie Hurley as Jen
- Reena Shah as Sejal
- Anand Chulani as Raju
- Jill Anderson as Lisa

The Philadelphia-based hip-hop band Fathead also appears in the film.
