= Desi Americans =

Desi Americans may refer to:

- South Asian Americans
- American-born confused desi, an informal term referring to South Asian Americans who were born or raised in the United States
