= Banana, coconut, and Twinkie =

Pejorative terms

Banana, coconut, and Twinkie are pejorative terms for Asian Americans who are perceived to have been assimilated and acculturated into mainstream American culture. In Australia, South Africa, and the United Kingdom, coconut is similarly used against people of color to imply a betrayal of their Aboriginal or other non-white ethnic identity. The terms derive from a perception that a person is "yellow [or brown] on the outside, white on the inside", or is "acting white".

== United States ==
In the United States, the terms banana, coconut, and Twinkie are primarily used for Asian Americans who are perceived to have been assimilated and acculturated into mainstream American culture and who do not conform to typical South Asian or East Asian cultures.

Banana and Twinkie refer to a person being perceived as "yellow on the outside, white on the inside", and are mainly applied to people from East Asia, the Philippines, Thailand, Vietnam, and some other parts of Southeast Asia. The latter term is derived from the American snack food called a Twinkie, which has a yellow exterior surrounding a white filling. Coconut is used to refer to darker-skinned Asians, such as those from South Asia or sometimes the Philippines.

Any of these terms may be used by Asians and Asian Americans, as well as non–Asian Americans, to disparage Asians or Asian Americans for a lack of perceived authenticity or conformity, and by non–Asian Americans to praise their assimilation into mainstream white, Anglo, Christian European-American culture.

== Commonwealth countries ==
In Australia, the term coconut is a derogatory term used against Indigenous Australians to imply a betrayal of their Aboriginal identity; a lack of loyalty to their people because they are perceived to be "acting white" (like a coconut, which is brown on the outside, white on the inside). This is analogous to the American usage described above, and similar in meaning to the American term Uncle Tom, also used in Australia, by which people are criticised for "acting white".

Coconut is used similarly in the UK and in South Africa.

== See also ==
- American-born confused desi – Cultural slang
- Banana § Racial signifier
- Boba liberal – Pejorative term for Asians in the West
- Choc ice § Slang
- Internalized racism – Adherence to racist beliefs and customs by subordinated groups
- Jook-sing – Term for person of Chinese descent who adopts Western cultural norms
- Oreo § Use of the word "Oreo" as a slur
- Race traitor – Pejorative racial term
- List of ethnic slurs § Twinkie
