= Sig Libowitz =

- Born: Sigmund Georg Libowitz; March 1, 1968 (age 58); Baltimore, Maryland, U.S.
- Education: New York University (BA); University of Maryland (JD)
- Occupations: Lawyer, actor, film executive, producer, writer, professor
- Children: 2

Sigmund Georg Libowitz (born March 1, 1968) is an American lawyer, actor, film executive, writer, producer, and professor. He is currently the director of the Graduate Film and Media program at Johns Hopkins University in Baltimore, Maryland. Libowitz is notable for writing, producing, and acting in the film The Response, which he wrote after reading the transcripts from the Guantanamo detainees' Combatant Status Review Tribunals.

== Education ==
Libowitz earned a Bachelor of Arts degree in theatre and politics from New York University and a Juris Doctor from the University of Maryland School of Law in 2007. One of Libowitz's professors at law school distributed Guantanamo transcripts to his class. Libowitz decided the transcript could be turned into a script.

== Career ==
From 2007 to 2012, Libowitz worked for the law firm Venable LLP.

Libowitz was a vice president of acquisitions and co-productions at Paramount Pictures. Prior to that, he was an executive at Film4 and Good Machine, where he oversaw production of the Academy Award-nominated film, In The Bedroom, starring Sissy Spacek, Tom Wilkinson, and Marisa Tomei. As an actor, Libowitz had recurring roles in The Sopranos and Law & Order.

The Response has screened at the Pentagon, United States Congress, United States Department of Justice, the United States Military Academy, and numerous universities including Harvard University, UCLA, and Columbia University. The Response was shortlisted for the 2010 Academy Award (Best Live Action Short), but was not nominated. It won the 2009 ABA Award as Best of the Year in Drama and Literature. Previous ABA winners include To Kill a Mockingbird, Twelve Angry Men, and Judgment at Nuremberg.

Peter Riegert, Kate Mulgrew star as the two other JAG officers on the Tribunal. Aasif Mandvi stars as the detainee. Following the release of his film, The Response, Sig was invited to visit Guantanamo Bay, Cuba as a legal observer.

== Filmography ==
=== Film ===
Year	Title	Role	Notes
1997	The Definite Maybe	Billy Bad Boy	
2001	The Believer	Rav Zingesser	
2001	Thirteen Conversations About One Thing	Assistant Attorney	
2006	The Ex	Hassidic Guy	
2008	The Response	Captain Miller	Short; also writer and producer

=== Television ===
Year	Title	Role	Notes
1997, 2005	Law & Order	Stan Shatenstein	2 episodes
1999–2004	The Sopranos	Hillel Teittleman	4 episodes
2002	Law & Order: Criminal Intent	Stan Shatenstein	Episode: "Tomorrow"
2002	Judging Amy	Mitchell Raskin	Episode: "Lost and Found"
2015	House of Cards	Supervisor	Episode: "Chapter 30"
2016	Bennie's	Steve C.	Episode: "Elevator"
2021	Turf Valley	Ted	2 episodes
