= The Trouble with Romance =

- Promotional film poster
- Directed by: Gene Rhee
- Written by: Gene Rhee; Sharri Hefner; Mike Su
- Produced by: Emily Liu; Gene Rhee; Jennifer Siebel
- Starring: Kip Pardue; David Eigenberg; Roger Fan; Josie Davis; Jordan Belfi; Jennifer Siebel; Sheetal Sheth; Portia Dawson
- Cinematography: Nathan Wilson
- Edited by: Jacqueline Cambas
- Release date: 2007
- Country: United States
- Language: English

The Trouble with Romance is a 2007 comedy-drama film directed by Gene Rhee and starring Kip Pardue, David Eigenberg, Roger Fan, Josie Davis, Sheetal Sheth, and Coby Ryan McLaughlin.
