= Finishing the Game =

- Theatrical release poster
- Directed by: Justin Lin
- Written by: Josh Diamond; Justin Lin
- Produced by: Julie Asato; Salvador Gatdula; Justin Lin
- Starring: McCaleb Burnett; Monique Gabriela Curnen; Roger Fan; Sung Kang; Mousa Kraish; Meredith Scott Lynn; Dustin Nguyen
- Cinematography: Tom Clancey
- Edited by: Greg Louie
- Music by: Brian Tyler
- Distributed by: IFC Films
- Release dates: January 21, 2007 (Sundance); October 5, 2007 (Limited)
- Running time: 88 minutes
- Country: United States
- Language: English
- Box office: $53,219

Finishing the Game is a 2007 mockumentary film directed by Justin Lin focusing on Bruce Lee's final movie Game of Death (1972), which was unfinished at the time of his death. Shot in 18 days, Finishing the Game comically satirizes the 1972 production—which used body doubles and clips from other Lee movies—and addresses racial stereotypes in the Asian community.

Its world premiere took place at the 2007 Sundance Film Festival, where it was an Official Selection. It was also selected as the opening night film at the 25th San Francisco International Asian American Film Festival.

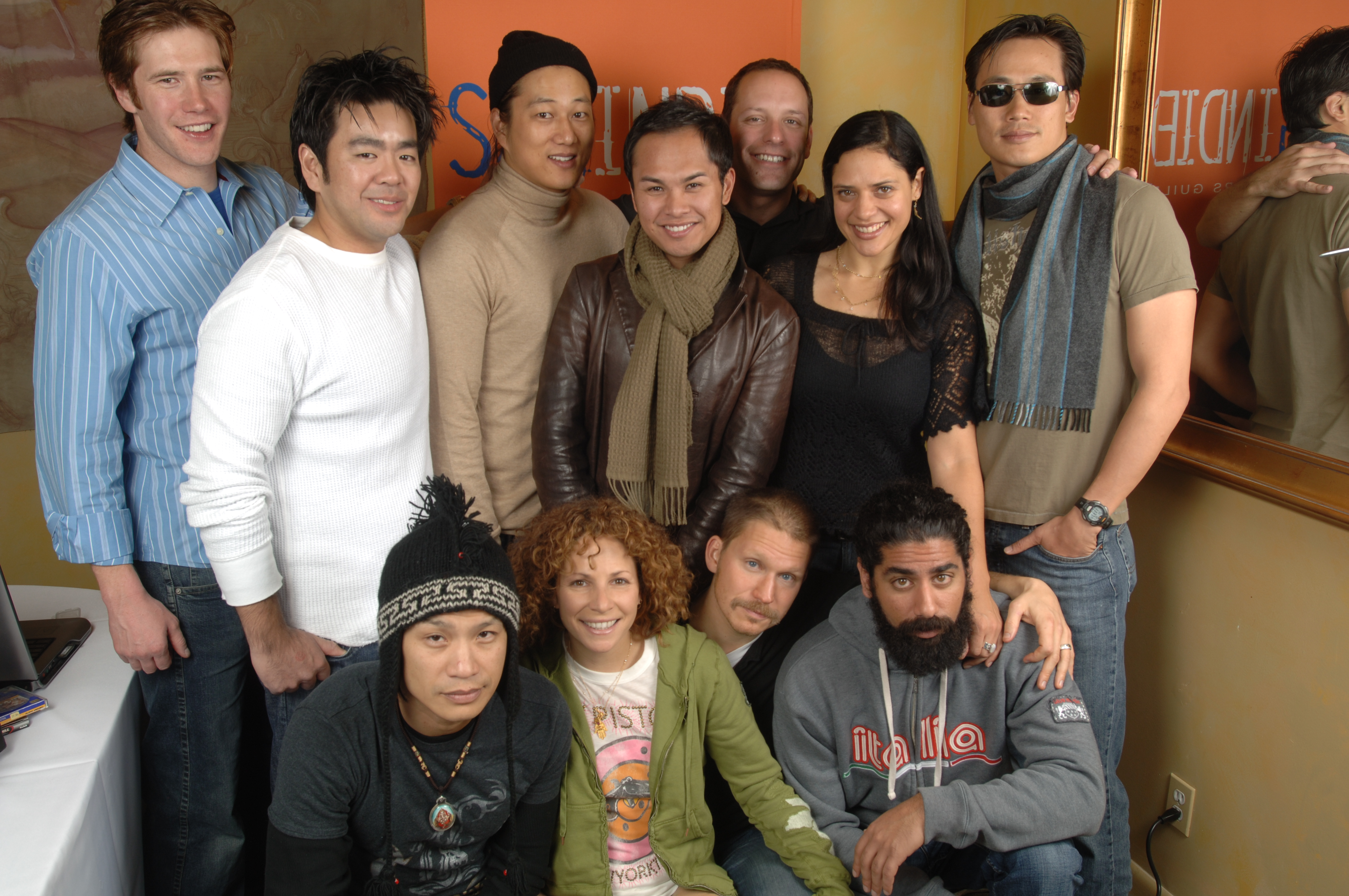
Part of the cast at 2007 Sundance Film Festival.

== Cast ==
- McCaleb Burnett as Tarrick Tyler
- Monique Gabriela Curnen as Saraghina Rivas
- Roger Fan as Breeze Loo
- Sung Kang as Colgate "Cole" Kim
- Mousa Kraish as Raja
- Meredith Scott Lynn as Eloise
- Dustin Nguyen as Troy Poon
- James Franco as Dean Silo
- MC Hammer as Roy Thunder
- Ron Jeremy as Peter Dowd
- Brian Tee as Mac Chang
- Leonardo Nam as Eli
- George Takei as Man in Black
- SuChin Pak as Connie Popavich-Mosimoto
- Bella Thorne as Sue
- Sam Bottoms as Martey Kurtainbaum
- Jake Sandvig as Ronney Kurtainbaum
- Michael Shamus Wiles as Officer Williams
- Nathan Jung as Bob
- Wilmer Calderon as Cesar (deleted scenes only)
- Cassidy Freeman as Shirley
- Joseph McQueen as Leroy/Earl
- David Collard as Victor
- Jim Parrack as Jerry

== Reception ==
Finishing the Game received mostly negative reviews from critics. On review aggregator website Rotten Tomatoes, the film has an approval rating of 34% based on 35 reviews, with an average rating of 4.8/10. The site's consensus reads, "Though Justin Lin's premise is precocious enough, the sight gags and comic timing are tired in this mockumentary about Asian typecasting in the 1970s." On Metacritic, the film has a score of 46 out of 100, based on 10 critics, indicating "mixed or average" reviews.
