= Shoba Narayan (actress) =

American actress

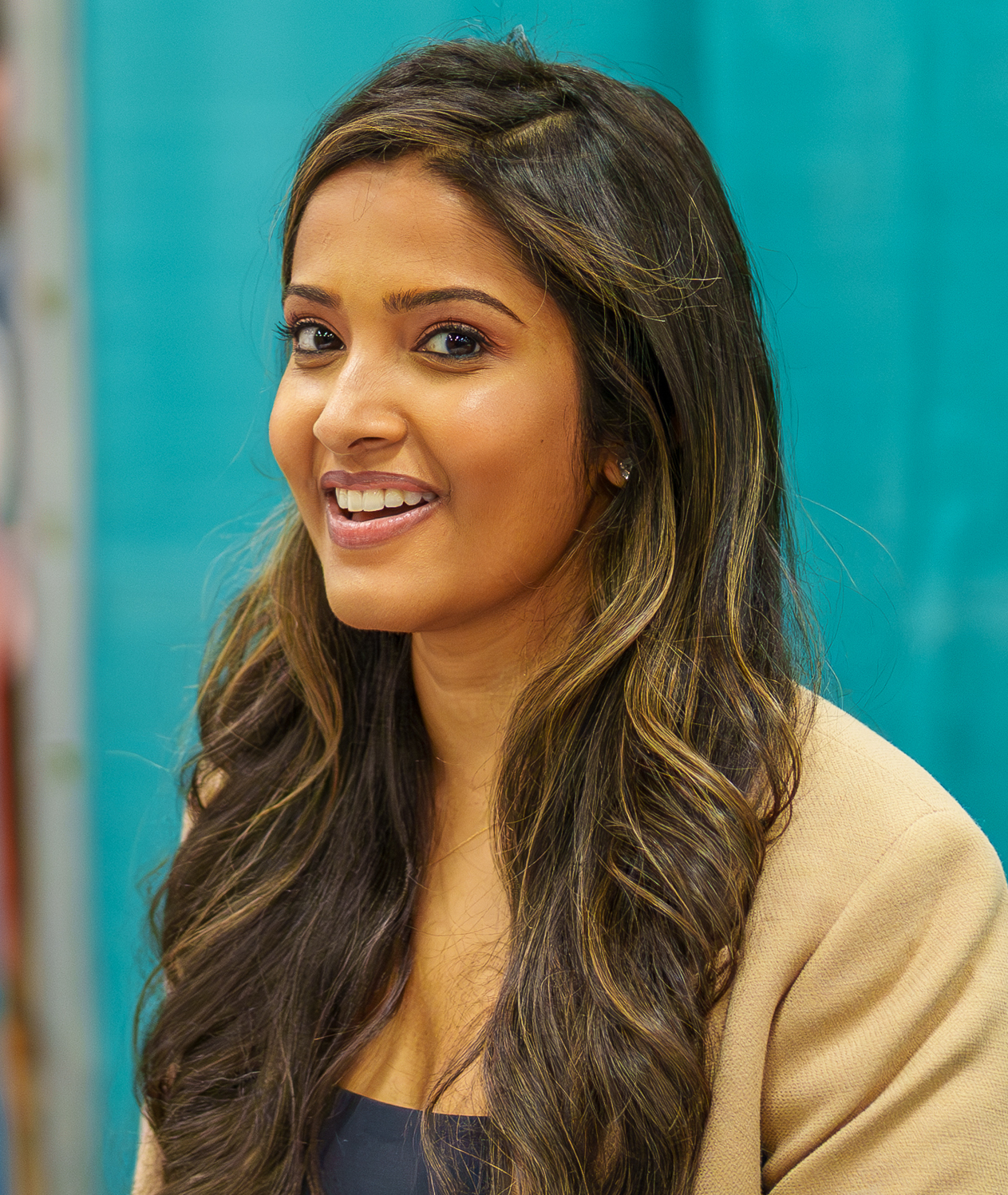
- Shoba Narayan at Galaxy Con Columbus 2025
- Born: November 5, 1989 (age 37); Bryn Mawr, Pennsylvania, U.S.
- Education: Boston Conservatory at Berklee (2012)
- Occupation: Musical theatre actress
- Spouse: Jay Shah (m. 2019)
- Children: 1

Shoba Narayan (born November 5, 1989) is an American musical theatre actress. She was the first South Asian to play Princess Jasmine in the Broadway show Aladdin.

== Early life ==
Narayan was born in Bryn Mawr, Pennsylvania to Indian immigrant parents. The only Indian family in town, Narayan has said she was mocked by her classmates for her name. She took dance classes in ballet and bharatanatyam, as well as classes in voice, violin, and Carnatic music. Interested in performing at a young age, her first leading role was as Dorothy in her eighth grade school production of The Wizard of Oz.

She graduated from the Boston Conservatory at Berklee in 2012 and moved to New York City to perform in theater.

== Acting career ==
Narayan's first Broadway role was as Natasha in Natasha, Pierre & The Great Comet of 1812. In that role, she was the first South Asian woman in a lead role on Broadway since Bombay Dreams in 2004.

She played Eliza Hamilton in the North American tour of Hamilton and Nessarose in Wicked. She was the first South Asian actress to play Nessarose. She is also the voice of Emily on the TV show Hazbin Hotel.

== Personal life ==
Shoba married Jay Shah in January 2019. The couple welcomed their first child, their daughter Leela, in August 2024.

== Theater credits ==
Year	Musical	Role	Type	Ref
2016–2017	Natasha, Pierre & The Great Comet of 1812	Ensemble, Natasha (understudy)	Broadway	
2018	Hamilton	Eliza Hamilton	North American Tour	
2019–2020	Wicked	Nessarose	Broadway	
2021–2023	Aladdin	Jasmine	Broadway	
2022	Come Fall in Love – The DDLJ Musical	Simran	Regional	

== Filmography ==
=== Television ===
Year(s)	Title	Role	Notes
2012	Gossip Girl	Don Nightingale	Episode: "Save the Last Chance"
2015	Halal in the Family	Whitney Qu'osby	4 episodes
2015	Quantico	Teenage Alex	Episode: "Run"
2024–present	Hazbin Hotel	Emily (voice)	5 episodes

=== Film ===
Year(s)	Title	Role	Notes
2015	Mistress America	Hallway Girl	
2015	Growing Up Smith	Asha Bhatnagar	
2017	Coin Heist	Junibel	
2017	Price for Freedom	Bijou	
2022	To the East	Neena	Short film

== Discography ==
=== Studio albums ===
Title	Album details
Soft Hours	Released: 2026; Formats: Digital download, streaming; Producer and Orchestrator: Or Matias

=== Album track listing ===
The album features minimalist, lullaby-style reimagining of Broadway classics alongside traditional Indian musical elements, dedicated to her daughter Leela.

Soft Hours

1. "The Music of the Night" (from The Phantom of the Opera)
2. "Children Will Listen" (from Into the Woods)
3. "Not While I'm Around" (from Sweeney Todd)
4. "A Whole New World" (from Aladdin)

=== Featured soundtracks ===
Title	Album details
Hazbin Hotel (Original Soundtrack)	Released: 2024; Label: A24 Music; Formats: Digital download, streaming, vinyl; Featured tracks: "Welcome to Heaven", "You Didn't Know"
Hazbin Hotel: Season Two (Original Soundtrack)	Released: 2025; Label: Atlantic Records; Formats: Digital download, streaming, vinyl, CD, cassette; Featured tracks: "Like You", "When I Think About the Future", "Hear My Hope"

== Dance ==
Narayan has worked as a teacher of bharatanatyam and has performed at weddings.

== Concerts and live performances ==
Narayan has performed as a soloist at several high-profile live concert events, blending her classical musical theater repertoire with cultural celebrations.

Year	Event / Concert	Venue / Location	Notes	Ref.
2022	Official White House Diwali Celebration	The White House	Became the first Indian-American artist invited to sing at the official White House Diwali event.	
2022	Solo Cabaret Series	Feinstein's/54 Below	Performed a series of solo musical cabaret engagements showcasing her Broadway career and vocal background.	
2023	Disney Animation 100th Anniversary Concert	Hollywood Bowl	Featured guest vocalist celebrating a century of Disney musical history.	
