= Nazar (1991 film) =

Nazar नजर
- Theatrical release poster
- Directed by: Mani Kaul
- Written by: Mani Kaul and Sharmistha Mohanty
- Based on: "The Meek One" a short story by Fyodor Dostoevsky
- Produced by: NFDC
- Starring: Shekhar Kapur; Shambhavi Kaul and Surekha Sikri
- Cinematography: Piyush Shah
- Edited by: Lalitha Krishna
- Music by: Vikram Joglekar and D. Wood
- Release date: 1991
- Running time: 84 minutes
- Country: India
- Language: Hindi

Nazar (The Gaze) is a 1991 Hindi-language film based on Fyodor Dostoevsky's 1876 short story, "The Meek One". The film produced by the National Film Development Corporation of India (NFDC) was directed by Mani Kaul and starred his daughter Shambhavi Kaul with Shekhar Kapur and Surekha Sikri.

The film travelled to international festivals like the Birmingham Film Festival in UK, Fribourg Film Festival in Germany, Hong Kong International Film Festival, Lisbon Film Festival in Portugal, Locarno Film Festival in Switzerland, London Film Festival in UK, Rotterdam Film Festival in Netherlands, Festival des 3 Continents at Nantes in France and the Seattle International Film Festival in United States.

== Storyline ==
A dealer lives in a spacious flat in a multi-storied building in Mumbai with his aunt. Though middle-aged himself, he marries a 17-year-old orphan girl and brings her home. The film starts off with the young wife committing suicide. He recollects what went before that and what might have moved her to end her life.

== Cast ==
- Shekhar Kapur
- Shambhavi Kaul
- Surekha Sikri
- Asha Dandavate
- Parvez Merchant
- A.A. Baig
