= Piyush Shah =

Indian cinematographer

- Education: FTII
- Occupations: cinematographer, documentary filmmaker
- Years active: 1986-present

Piyush Shah is an Indian cinematographer who has been active since 1986, primarily in Hindi cinema.

For his work on the documentary film Moksha (1993), he received the National Film Award for Best Cinematography.

In a career spanning nearly four decades, Piyush has worked on documentaries, feature films, television series, and commercials. He has been associated with key figures in Indian parallel cinema such as Mani Kaul, Kumar Shahani, and Shyam Benegal.

He has also collaborated closely with leading documentary filmmakers like Arun Khopkar, Pankaj Butalia, and Pan Nalin. Additionally, Piyush has contributed to projects with popular mainstream directors including Rajkumar Santoshi, Ram Gopal Varma, Priyadarshan, and Ashutosh Gowariker.

== Early life and career ==
Piyush obtained his diploma in cinematography from the Film & Television Institute of India (FTII) in 1985. He began his career soon after, working on short films like Bodh Vriksha, Var Var Vari, and Before My Eyes.

Bodh Vriksha, Rajan Khosa’s diploma film at FTII, won a special mention for the director at the National Film Awards in 1986. The film also received two international jury awards.

Shahani's Var Var Vari was the debut film of actor Mita Vasisht and the diploma film in editing of FTII student Nandini Bedi.

Between 1989 and 1991, Piyush collaborated with Mani Kaul on two short films (Before My Eyes, Siddheshwari) and two feature films (Nazar, Idiot).

Films photographed by him have received more than 35 national and international awards, in addition to nominations and screenings at notable film festivals.

Piyush also did aerial photography for Benegal’s television series Bharat Ek Khoj (1988), based on Jawaharlal Nehru's book The Discovery of India.

He provided lighting for two stage plays—Kunti and The Human Voice, directed by Shahani.

Overall, he has photographed, directed, and produced more than 40 films and commercials.

== Filmography ==
As cinematographer - feature films

- Nazar (1990)
- Idiot (1991)
- Suraj Ka Satvan Ghoda / The Seventh Horse of the Sun (1992)
- Jaya Ganga (1996)
- Dance of the Wind (1997)
- China Gate (1998)
- Mast (1999)
- Salaam-E-Ishq (2007)
- Dhol (2007)
- Taare Zameen Par (2007) – director of photography, second unit
- Mere Baap Pehle Aap (2008)
- What's Your Rashee? (2009)
- From Sydney with Love (2012)
- The Wisdom Tree (2013)
- Saina (2021)

As cinematographer - short films / documentaries

- Bodh Vriksha / Wisdom Tree (1986)
- Var Var Vari (1987)
- Before My Eyes (1989)
- Siddeshwari (1990)
- Figures of Thought (1990)
- Sanchari (1991)
- Riyaaz (1991)
- The Khajuraho (1991)
- A Man Who Looked Like Christ (1992)
- Moksha (1993)
- Colours of Absence (1993)
- Kisses on a Train (1993)
- The Doubt (1995)
- Lost & Found (1995)
- Kaal (1996)
- The Devadasi (1997)
- Eiffel Tower Trilogy: Height, Weight,& Gravity (1997)
- Tehri - Kaksi Matkaa (2000)
- Day 1, Day 2, Day 3, Day 4 (2011)
- Chitrashala (2015)
- Farewell My Indian Soldier (2016)

As cinematographer - television series

- Bharat Ek Khoj / The Discovery of India (1988) - aerial shots
- Everest (2014)
- Target (2021)

As cinematographer - commercials

- Smirnoff

As director - short film

- The Third Infinity (2017)

As producer - feature film

- Agnichakra (1997)

As director of lighting - stage plays

- Kunti
- The Human Voice
