= Josie Davis =

American actress (born 1973)

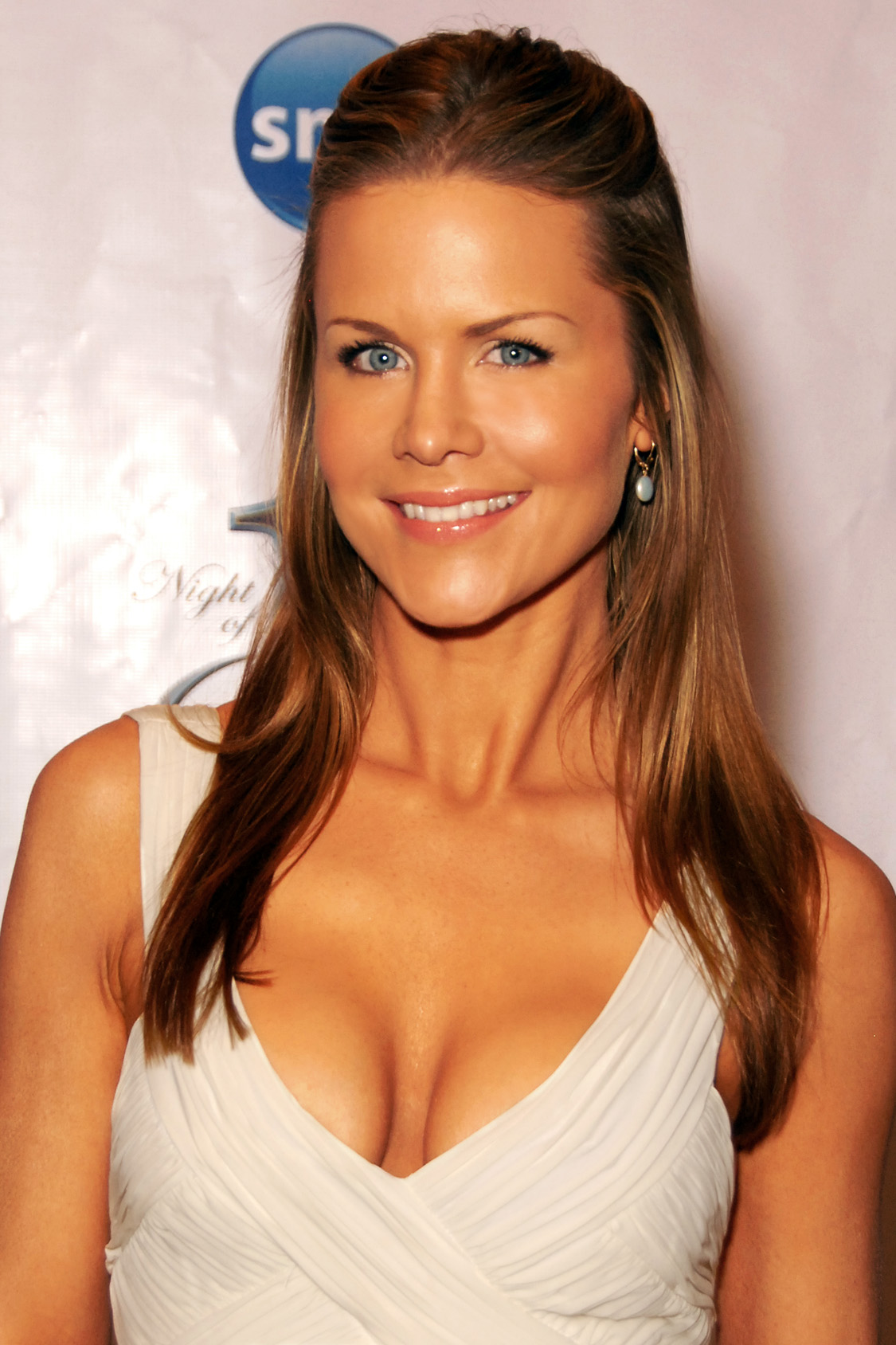
- Davis attending the "Night of 100 Stars" for the 82nd Academy Awards viewing party at the Beverly Hills Hotel in 2010
- Born: January 16, 1973 (age 53); Los Angeles, California, U.S.
- Occupations: Actress; screenwriter; producer
- Years active: 1982–present
- Known for: Charles in Charge
- Website: www.josiedavis.com

Josie Davis (born January 16, 1973) is an American actress, screenwriter and producer, best known for her role as Sarah Powell in the television sitcom Charles in Charge from 1987 to 1990.

== Career ==
=== Television ===
Born January 16, 1973 in California, Davis began her acting career at the age of three years. After nine years of acting, she received her first role on television as the character Sarah Powell on the sitcom Charles in Charge for 104 episodes across four seasons. Sarah Powell was a quiet, bookish character, and after Charles in Charge wrapped, Davis had a difficult time shedding that image and getting people to forget the character she created and to see her as outgoing.

Beginning as a teenager, Davis studied acting with the Brooklyn-born Paul E. Richards—Lee Strasberg's "right-hand man" at the Actors Studio in the 1950s. At 24, she auditioned and became a member of Actors Studio. At the time, the judges were Martin Landau, Mark Rydell, and Shelley Winters. Josie was one of only two performers selected to join that year.

In 2000, Davis was cast as Camille Desmond on the drama Beverly Hills, 90210 for a total of 11 episodes. Also in 2000, she then was cast in another Aaron Spelling show, Titans opposite Victoria Principal and Yasmine Bleeth.

Her other television credits include working opposite Clifton Collins Jr. on Fear Itself, with David Spade on Rules of Engagement, with James Woods on Shark, Ghost Whisperer, a Christmas episode of Two and a Half Men, NCIS, CSI: Miami, Burn Notice, Chuck, Bones, and a recurring role opposite Skeet Ulrich and Gary Sinise on CSI: NY.

=== Film ===
After Titans came to an end, Davis left TV to pursue film work. She acted in films, including the Nicolas Cage-directed Sonny, opposite James Franco and Scott Caan, The Trouble with Romance with Kip Pardue, and Kalamazoo? with Mayim Bialik, among other indies.

She was also the lead actress in the television movie The Perfect Assistant, which premiered on Lifetime on January 2, 2008.

She also did thrillers The Perfect Student with Natasha Henstridge, Seduced by Lies with Lochlyn Munro and Marc Menard, Past Obsession with Lochlyn Munro and comedy Stealing Roses with John Heard and Cindy Williams. Davis not only is an actress, but has ventured into producing and is also a screenwriter.

== Filmography ==
=== Film ===
Year	Title	Role	Notes
1996	Beach House	Sorority Sister	
1997	Badge of Fear	Samantha Edwards	Video
2001	Outlook Good	Daisy	Short
2002	L.A. Law: The Movie	Chloe Carpenter	TV movie
2002	Sonny	Gretchen	
2002	Psychic Murders	Serafina Dalton	Video
2003	Lotto	Stacey	Short
2004	Slammed	Shane Masters	
2005	Blind Injustice	Susan Tyrell	TV movie
2006	Kalamazoo?	Carol Cavanaugh	
2006	McBride: Requiem	Ava Fletcher	TV movie
2007	Carolina Moon	Faith Lavelle	TV movie
2007	The Trouble with Romance	Karen	
2007	In the Land of Merry Misfits	Gwendlyn	
2007	Be My Baby	Linda	
2007	Chasing Tchaikovsky	Josette	
2008	The Perfect Assistant	Rachel Partson	TV movie
2008	Twilight	Lucy/Nikki	Short
2010	The Cursed	Mrs. Jimmy Muldoon	
2010	Seduced by Lies	Laura Colton	TV movie
2010	Tranced	Annie Bodie	
2010	The Ascent	Emily Wilks	
2011	The Perfect Student	Tara	TV movie
2011	Past Obsessions	Shane Walsh	TV movie
2012	Stealing Roses	Sally	
2013	Dirty Teacher	Molly Matson	TV movie
2013	Notes from Dad	April Sutton	TV movie
2014	Mantervention	TSA supervisor	
2015	Hit & Run	Heather Williams	TV movie
2015	The Garden	Anna	Short
2016	Backstabbed	Paulette Bolton	TV movie
2017	Secrets of My Stepdaughter	Cindy Kent	TV movie
2017	Locked In	Ann Marie	TV movie
2019	The Lovelys	Newscaster (voice)	Short
2019	The Secret Lives of Cheerleaders	Ms Sinclair	TV movie
2022	Black Balsam	Ellen Roth	
2023	Glowzies	Dr. Barbeau	
2024	Festival of Trees	Alice Stewart	TV movie
2025	Pardon Me: The Bevelyn B. Williams Story	Judge Lancaster	

=== Television ===
Year	Title	Role	Notes
1987–90	Charles in Charge	Sarah Powell	Main Cast: Season 2-5
1990	Free Spirit	Cassandra Goodwinn	Episode: "Love and Death"
1992	Silk Stalkings	Alex	Episode: "Love-15"
1994	Silk Stalkings	Luanna	Episode: "Head 'N' Tail"
1994	Dead at 21	Earth	Episode: "Hotel California"
1996	High Tide	Tina Chapman	Episode: "Code Name: Scorpion"
1996–97	The Young and the Restless	Grace Turner	Regular Cast (Note: After one year, the role was recast with Jennifer Gareis.)
1998	Beverly Hills, 90210	Madeline	Episode: "Crimes and Misdemeanors"
1998	Arliss	Baseball Wife	Episode: "Behind Every Great Client..."
1998	Baywatch	Liz Brooks	Episode: "The Edge"
1999	Guys Like Us	Jennifer	Episode: "Jared's Ex"
1999	Nash Bridges	Ursula	Episode: "Superstition"
1999	Love Boat: The Next Wave	-	Episode: "Love Floats: The St. Valentine’s Day Massacre"
1999	Mortal Kombat: Conquest	Peron	Episode: "The Serpent and the Ice"
1999	L.A. Heat	Wendy	Episode: "In Harm's Way"
1999	Profiler	Anne Lofton	Episode: "Las Brisas"
2000	Celebrity Profile	Herself	Episode: "Scott Baio"
2000	Beverly Hills, 90210	Camille Desmond	Recurring Cast: Season 10
2000	Titans	Laurie Williams	Main Cast
2002	Philly	Lili Alexander	Episode: "Thanks for the Mammaries"
2003	The Division	Anna Marks	Episode: "Oh Mother, Who Art Thou?"
2004	CSI: Miami	Mary Donlan	Episode: "Money for Nothing"
2004	NCIS	Marta	Episode: "Reveille"
2005	Living with Fran	Laurie Dean	Episode: "Sweet Sixteen Again with Fran"
2005	Eve	Melanie Van Lowe	Episode: "The Lyin’, the Witch and the Wardrobe"
2005	Two and a Half Men	Sandy	Episode: "Santa’s Village of the Damned"
2006	E! True Hollywood Story	Herself	Episode: "Charles in Charge"
2007	Ghost Whisperer	Sally Hawkins	Episode: "The Cradle Will Rock"
2007	Shark	Kelly Abbott	Episode: "No Holds Barred"
2008	Rules of Engagement	Clarissa	Episode: "Optimal Male"
2008	Fear Itself	Kathy Mahoney	Episode: "Family Man"
2009	Burn Notice	April Luna	Episode: "Shot in the Dark"
2009	Bones	Paula Lindbergh	Episode: "The Beautiful Day in the Neighborhood"
2009	CSI: NY	Calliope Eckhart	Recurring Cast: Season 6
2010	Chuck	Serena	Episode: "Chuck Versus First Class"
2011	Breakout Kings	Kate Lavin	Episode: "One for the Money"
2012	Unscripted	Herself	Episode: "Josie Davis"
2012	Hollywood Heights	Daphne Miller	Recurring Cast
2013	The Mentalist	Sonya	Episode: "The Desert Rose"
2014	Hawaii Five-0	Patti Gable	Episode: "Ka Hana Malu"
2020	Stumptown	Darlene McConnell	Episode: "At All Costs: The Conrad Costas Chronicles"
2022	Cooking with the Stars	Herself	Episode: "Russell Peters"

== Awards ==
Josie won the Young Artist Award for Best Young Actress in a Family Syndicated Show in 1989 for her work on Charles in Charge.
