= Halal in the Family =

- Genre: Drama
- Written by: Miles Kahn; Aasif Mandvi
- Directed by: Miles Kahn
- Starring: Aasif Mandvi; Sakina Jaffrey; Shoba Narayan; Nicky Maindiratta
- No. of episodes: 4

Production
- Cinematography: Rick Siegel

Halal in the Family (also known as The Qu'osby Show) is a four-episode American web series starring Aasif Mandvi and Sakina Jaffrey. It premiered on Funny or Die featuring an American Muslim family and addressing the underlying issues of Islamophobia in a comedic context. It uses the classic family sitcom formula to change perceptions of Muslims. Mandvi stated in the fifth episode of season 2 of Politically Re-Active that Halal in the Family is being developed as an animated series for TBS.

== Cast ==
=== Main cast ===
- Aasif Mandvi as Aasif Qu'osby
- Sakina Jaffrey as Fatima Qu'osby
- Shoba Narayan as Whitney Qu’osby
- Nicky Maindiratta as Bobby Qu’osby

=== Supporting cast ===
- Tariq Trotter as Cousin Tariq
- Samantha Bee as Wendy
- Jordan Klepper as Waleed
- Russ Armstrong as Mr. Smith
- Jason Babinsky as Protester
- Morgan Turner as Jessica

== Episodes ==
1. "Spies Like Us"
2. "A Very Spooq'y Halloween Special"
3. "B'ully"
4. "The Amazing Race"

== Awards ==
- 2016 Peabody-Facebook Futures of Media Award
