= American-born Chinese =

Chinese national born in the US

American-born Chinese 美國出生華裔 / 美国出生华裔
Total population
- 1,830,760; 0.55% of the U.S. population (2015)

Regions with significant populations
- New York City Area, San Francisco Bay Area, Los Angeles Area

Languages
- Predominantly English, varieties of Chinese

Religion
- Unaffiliated, Buddhism, Protestantism, Catholicism, and Taoism

Related ethnic groups
- Asian Americans, Overseas Chinese, Chinese Canadians

American-born Chinese (abbreviated as ABC) is a term widely used as an ethnic generational identifier to refer to Chinese people who were born in the United States and received U.S. citizenship due to birthright citizenship in the United States.

== Contested usage ==
In comparison to the term Chinese American, American-born Chinese may not always denote U.S. citizenship, (mainland) Chinese nationals that were born in the United States often renounce their U.S. citizenship due to China prohibiting its citizens from holding multiple citizenships. According to some, the term has perpetual foreigner connotations. It has been noted that the term differs from existing patterns of immigrant designation in American English. For example, Peter Thiel is considered a "German-born American". In this case, the first demographic word refers to the person's citizenship at birth, and the second refers to his citizenship at present. However, in the case of "American-born Chinese," the first demographic word refers to the subject's citizenship at birth (or at present) and the second word to ethnicity.

It has also been observed that, in practice, the term American-born Chinese includes hundreds of thousands of Americans of Chinese descent who were (technically speaking) not born in America, but rather brought over by their parents at a young age. This indicates that the term may be a misnomer.

== Demographics ==
In differing degrees, many ABCs draw together Chinese family culture with American societal culture, developing a transnational life and identity. However, this begins to shift in subsequent generations as families structures change through interracial marriage. In 2000, approximately 45% of American-born Chinese marry non-Chinese Americans; this is contrasted with Chinese Americans more generally, whereby 81.5% of men and 77.9% of women married other Chinese Americans.

== In popular culture ==
The term was used in the 2006 graphic novel by Gene Luen Yang, entitled American Born Chinese. The book was adapted into the series of the same name for Disney+.

The term was used in the book Crazy Rich Asians, by Kevin Kwan, which has been adapted into a movie of the same name.

== Related identity terms ==
American-born Chinese is one of several cultural identifiers for bicultural populations in the United States. Similar terms include Nisei for Japanese Americans, American-Born Confused Desi (ABCD) for South Asian Americans, Generation Ñ for bilingual Latinos, Chicano for Mexican Americans, and Nuyorican for New York Puerto Ricans.

== See also ==
- Demographics of the United States
- Jook-sing (竹升), a Cantonese term for an overseas Chinese person who was born in a Western environment and/or a Chinese person who more readily or strongly identifies with Western culture than traditional Chinese culture
- List of Chinese Americans
- Natural-born-citizen clause
- Third culture kid (TCK)
- American-Born Confused Desi (ABCD)
