= Roger Fan =

American actor (born 1972)

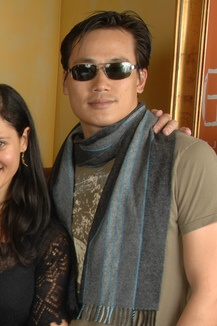
- Fan in 2007
- Born: August 11, 1972 (age 53); Baltimore, Maryland, U.S.
- Education: Brown University (BA)
- Occupation: Actor
- Years active: 1998–present
- Awards: Distinguished Moviemaker Mentor Award (2007 Sundance Film Festival)

Roger Fan (born August 11, 1972) is a Taiwanese-American actor. He is best known for his collaborations with Justin Lin and his appearances in the films Annapolis, Finishing the Game and Better Luck Tomorrow.

== Background ==
Fan, a Taiwanese American, was born in Baltimore, Maryland and raised in Southern California, growing up in Upland, California, a suburb of Los Angeles. He graduated from the Webb Schools of California and also graduated with a degree in economics from Brown University. He initially worked on Wall Street and in San Francisco as a financial consultant, but spent his off time acting in theatre.

== Career ==
Fan is likely most known for his role as Daric Loo in Justin Lin's seminal Asian American film, Better Luck Tomorrow (2002). He also appeared as Bruce Lee's rival "Breeze Loo" in Lin's Finishing the Game (2007). Fan has also appeared in Lin's Annapolis as Loo, and in Lin's Fast & Furious as an FBI Agent.

Fan has also appeared in the films Drillbit Taylor (2008) (as Bodyguard with Knives), Jessica Yu's Ping Pong Playa (2007) (as Michael Wang, the brother of Jimmy Tsai's character), Corky Romano (2001) (as Agent Bob Cox), Gene Rhee's The Trouble with Romance (2007) (as Jimmy) and Rush Hour (as Soo Yung's bodyguard).

Fan has also appeared on the TV shows Arli$$ (as Comet), Party of Five, NewsRadio (as Orderly), Martial Law (as Johnny Lao), Frasier (as Waiter), Bull (as Woo), ER, Karaoke Nights (as Irving), American Dad!, and the web series Easy to Assemble.

Fan has also appeared in Judy Soo Hoo's play Solve for X for the Next Stage Festival at the Cleveland Playhouse, opposite Kelvin Han Yee and Elaine Kao.

== Filmography ==
The following is a list of Fan's filmography:

- Rush Hour (1998)...Soo Yung's Bodyguard
- Backyard Dogs (2000)...Rick
- Corky Romano (2001)...Agent Bob Cox
- Better Luck Tomorrow (2002)...Daric Loo
- Stuck On You (2003)...Executive #1
- D.E.B.S. (2004)...News Anchor #1
- Annapolis (2006)...Loo
- Finishing the Game (2007)...Breeze Loo
- The Trouble with Romance (2007)...Jimmy
- Ping Pong Playa (2007)...Michael Wang
- Drillbit Taylor (2008)...Bodyguard with Knives
- Fast & Furious (2009)...FBI Agent #3
- Hollywood Adventures (2015)...Agent Li (Chinese debut)
- Blood Type (2018)...Paramedic
