= The Wisdom Tree =

- Teaser poster
- Directed by: Sunil Shah
- Written by: Sunil Shah
- Produced by: Laura Techera Francia; Renu Vora
- Starring: Sheetal Sheth; Patrick Alparone; Eric Holter; Nick Scoggin; Ross Turner
- Cinematography: Piyush Shah
- Edited by: Sunil Shah; Renu Vora
- Music by: Shweta Jhaveri
- Release date: December 7, 2013
- Running time: 132 minutes
- Country: United States
- Language: English

The Wisdom Tree is a 2013 independent mystery science fiction film directed by Sunil Shah and starring Sheetal Sheth, Patrick Alparone, Eric Holter, Nick Scoggin, and Ross Turner. The film weaves science with art, music and mysticism.

The film was screened to a limited audience in February 2013 at Emory University, and to attendees at the Science and Non-Duality Conference, (San Jose, California) in October 2013. The film's premiere is scheduled for December 7, 2013 at AMC Metreon (San Francisco, California). The film is slated for release across the United States in January 2014.

== Premise ==
Steve Hamilton (Patrick Alparone), a conflicted quantum physicist, is struggling to deal with the aftermath of a mysterious car accident. His research on a potentially ground-breaking theory is in jeopardy. Together with Dr. Trisha Rao (Sheetal Sheth), a neuroscientist, and Mike Parker (Eric Holter), an FBI agent, Hamilton investigates a mystery.

== Cast ==
- Patrick Alparone as Steve Hamilton
- Sheetal Sheth as Dr. Trisha Rao
- Eric Holter as Mike Parker
- Nick Scoggin as Eugene Rogers
- Ross Turner as Dr. Richard Armstong
- Jessica Raaum as Debbie Hay

== Production ==
The film was written and directed by Sunil Shah and produced by Laura Techera Francia and Renu Vora.

The film score was composed by William Storkson, and features seven solo compositions rendered by Shweta Jhaveri, an Indian classical music vocalist and composer.
