= The Response (film) =

2008 documentary film

- Courtroom Drama based on the actual transcripts of the Guantanamo Bay military tribunals.
- Directed by: Adam Rodgers
- Written by: Sig Libowitz
- Produced by: Sig Libowitz
- Starring: Kate Mulgrew, Peter Riegert, Aasif Mandvi
- Cinematography: Richard Chisolm
- Edited by: Steve Bell
- Release date: 2008
- Running time: 30 minutes
- Language: English

The Response is a courtroom drama based on transcripts of the Combatant Status Review Tribunals held at Guantanamo Bay in the aftermath of the 9/11 attacks on the United States. The film takes the viewer inside the tribunal of a suspected Al Queda enemy combatant and the three military officers who must decide his fate. The film is 30 minutes long.

The film stars Kate Mulgrew, Peter Riegert, Aasif Mandvi, and Sig Libowitz, who also wrote and produced The Response. The film was directed by Adam Rodgers.

The Response was shortlisted for a 2010 Academy Award (Best Short Film, Live Action) and named the Silver Gavel Award winner as Best of the Year in Drama & Literature by the American Bar Association.

The film was an official selection to seven Academy Award qualifying festivals as well as the Politics in Film Festival in Washington DC.

Michael Greenberger, a professor at the University of Maryland, consulted for the film, in his capacity as a former Justice Department counter-terrorism official.
