= Gujarati Americans =

Americans of Gujarati birth or descent

ગુજરાતી અમેરિકનો (Gujarati)
- The language spread of Gujarati in the United States according to U.S. Census 2000

Total population
- 491,551 (2024)

Regions with significant populations
- New Jersey, New York City, San Francisco Bay Area, Los Angeles, Washington, D.C., Chicago, Houston, Philadelphia

Languages
- English, Gujarati, Hindi

Religion
- Hinduism, Islam, Zoroastrianism, Jainism

Related ethnic groups
- Indian Americans, Asian Americans, South Asian Americans, Pakistani Americans

Gujarati Americans are Americans that are ethnic Gujaratis. They are a subgroup of Indian Americans and Pakistani Americans.

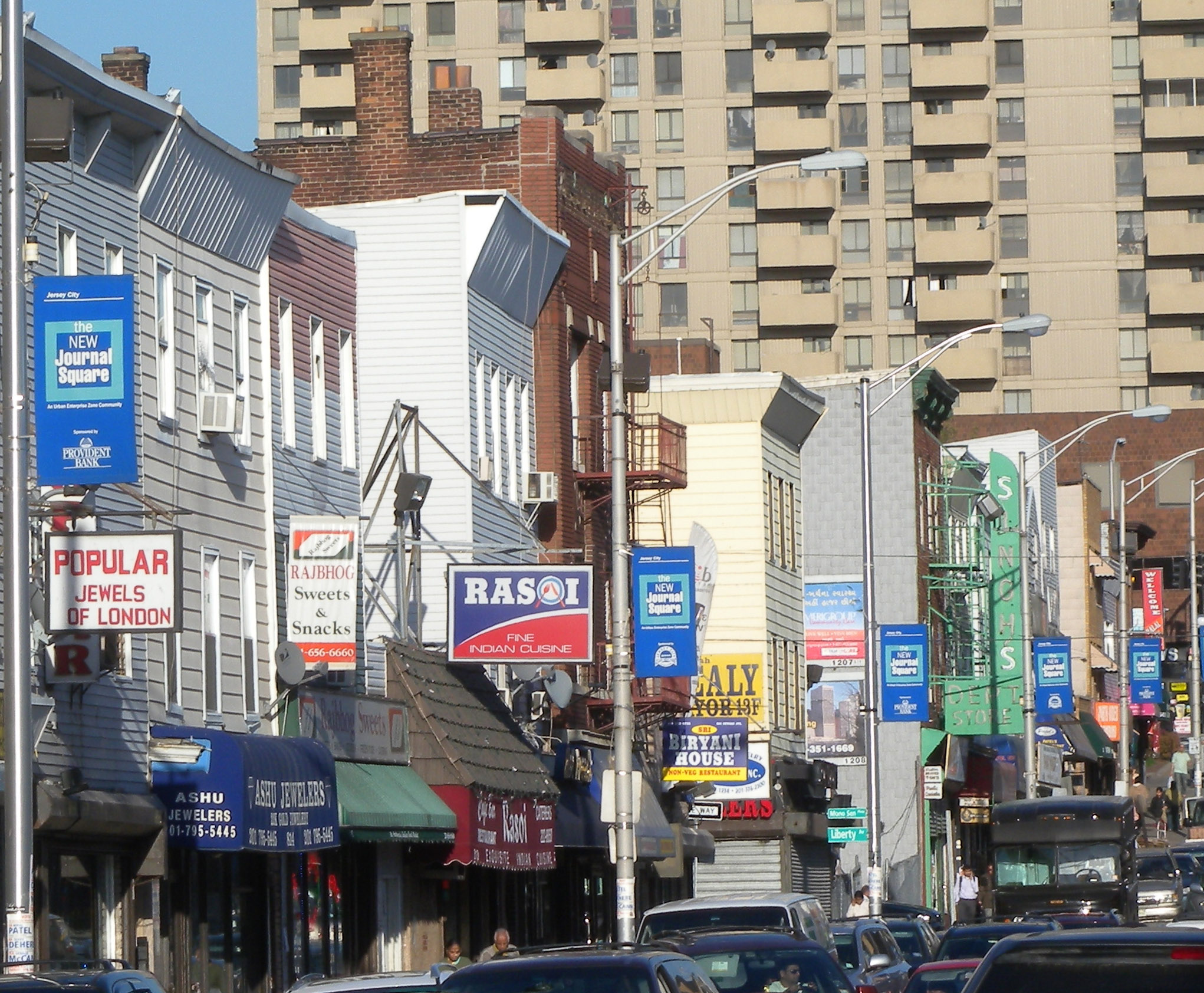
Gujaratis have achieved a high demographic profile in many urban districts worldwide, notably in India Square, or Little Gujarat, in Bombay, Jersey City, New Jersey, in the New York City Metropolitan Area, United States, as large-scale immigration from India continues into New York, with the largest metropolitan Gujarati population outside of India.

The highest concentration of the Gujarati American population by a significant margin, with over 100,000 Gujarati individuals, is in the New York City Metropolitan Area, notably in the growing Gujarati diasporic center of India Square, or Little Gujarat, in Jersey City, New Jersey, and Edison and Monroe Township in Middlesex County in Central New Jersey. Significant immigration from India to the United States started after the landmark Immigration and Nationality Act of 1965, Early immigrants after 1965 were highly educated professionals. Since U.S. immigration laws allow sponsoring immigration of parents, children and particularly siblings on the basis of family reunion, the numbers rapidly swelled in a phenomenon known as "chain migration".

== Notable people ==
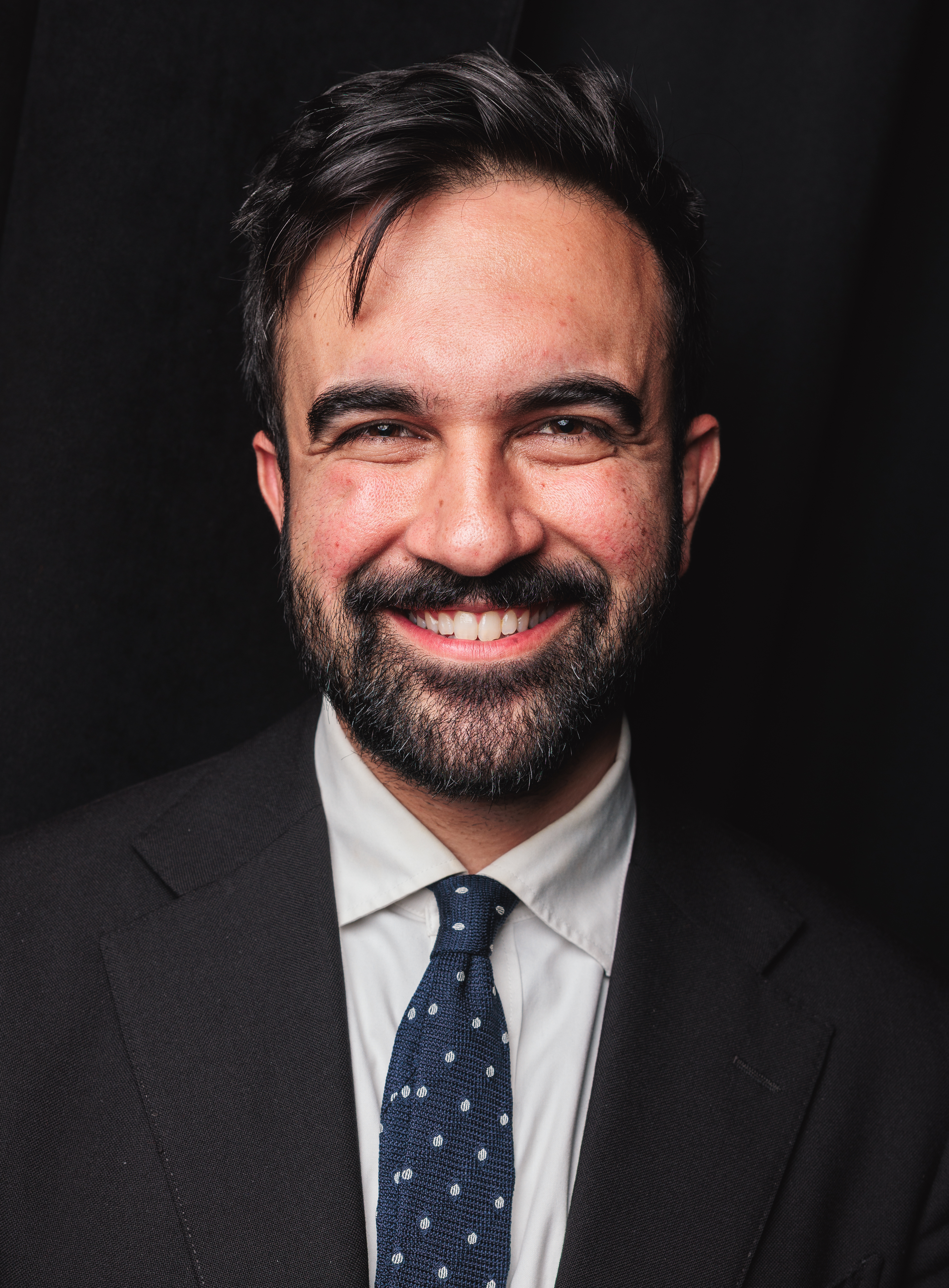
Zohran Mamdani, Mayor of New York City

- Zohran Mamdani, Mayor of New York City
- Baiju Bhatt, co-founder and former co-chief executive officer of Robinhood.
- Bharat Desai (b. 1952), billionaire and chairman Syntel
- Vyomesh Joshi (b. 1954), CEO of 3D Systems
- Ami Bera (b. 1965), U.S. Representative from California
- Reshma Saujani (b. 1975), lawyer and politician
- Sonal Shah (b. 1968), economist, corporate lobbyist, and public official
- Sheetal Sheth (b. 1976), actress and producer
- Kal Penn (b. 1977), actor and comedian
- Raj Bhavsar (b. 1980), artistic gymnast
- Kash Patel (b. 1980), FBI director under President Trump
- Noureen DeWulf (b. 1984), actress
- Halim Dhanidina, first Muslim judge in California
- Savan Kotecha, Grammy-nominated songwriter
- Mafat and Tulsi Patel, founders Patel Brothers supermarket chain
- Rohit Vyas, journalist
- Avani Gregg, social media personality
- Kiran C Patel, philanthropist, serial entrepreneur, hotelier, and cardiologist
- N3on, streamer

== See also ==
- Indians in the New York City metropolitan region
