= Kalamazoo? =

- Film poster
- Directed by: David O'Malley
- Written by: Joanna Clare Scott
- Starring: Mayim Bialik; Josie Davis; Joanna Clare Scott
- Cinematography: Matt Molitor
- Edited by: Chris Conlee; Michael Spence
- Music by: Tom Batoy; Alex Menck
- Distributed by: Shoreline Entertainment
- Release date: April 7, 2006
- Running time: 107 minutes
- Country: United States
- Language: English
- Box office: $161.000

Kalamazoo? is a 2006 American comedy film, directed by David O'Malley and starring Josie Davis, Mayim Bialik and Joanna Clare Scott, who also wrote the screenplay. The movie was filmed entirely in Kalamazoo, Michigan.

== Plot ==
Carol (Josie Davis), Maggie (Mayim Bialik) and Joan (Joanna Clare Scott) are three friends who took different ways in their lives. The girls go back to Kalamazoo, Michigan for their 10-year high school reunion, but they discovered that a time capsule placed on their graduation night containing predictions would be opened in one week. Horrified at the thought of having their unfulfilled goals made public, they decide to steal the time capsule and destroy it. But they have to deal with the life they left behind, including former loves and family.

== Cast ==
- Mayim Bialik as Maggie Goldman
- Josie Davis as Carol Cavanaugh
- Joanna Clare Scott as Joan Branson
- Claire Bloom as Eleanor
- Chita Rivera as Giannina
- Renée Taylor as Golda
- Steven Roy as Paul
- Nathan Anderson as Stephen
- Larry Sullivan as Nate
- Joanne Baron as Mrs. Goldman
- Dee Wallace as Susan
- Michael Boatman as Albert
- Anne De Salvo as Mia Cacciani
- Ted Raimi as Angel

== Personnel ==
Adapted from Cine TVX.

- David O'Malley – director, executive producer
- Joanna Clare Scott – screenwriter, producer
- Dana E. Kowalski – screenwriter
- Isabel Holtreman – screenwriter
