= Three Veils =

- Original film poster
- Directed by: Rolla Selbak
- Written by: Rolla Selbak
- Produced by: Jeremy Elliott; Fahmi Farouk Farahat; Yusuf Yenil; Brad Hagen; Mohannad Malas; Ahmad Zahra
- Starring: Sheetal Sheth; Angela Zahra; Mercedes Mason
- Cinematography: John Frost
- Edited by: Fahmi Farouk Farahat
- Music by: Vicente Avella
- Release date: March 9, 2011 (Portland Women's Film Festival)
- Running time: 117 min
- Country: United States
- Language: English

Three Veils is a 2011 film written and directed by Rolla Selbak and starring Sheetal Sheth, Angela Zahra and Mercedes Mason. The film is notable for featuring a lesbian character. Selbak herself is a lesbian. It has won several awards.

== Plot summary ==
Three Veils is about three young Middle-Eastern women living in the U.S., each with their own personal story. Leila is engaged to be married, however as the wedding night approaches, she becomes less and less sure. Amira is a devout Muslim, but is dealing with her deep repressed lesbian feelings. Nikki is acting out her promiscuity as she battles her own demons after a tragic death in the family. As the film progresses, all three stories unfold and blend into each other as connections are revealed between the three women.

== Awards ==
Three Veils won the award for best picture at the 14th Arpa International Film Festival. It also won the Rainbow Award at the 22nd Honolulu Rainbow Film Festival. For the 2012 FilmOut San Diego awards, Three Veils tied for Best Screenplay alongside Michael D. Akers and Sandon Berg's 2012 film Morgan. Additionally, Rolla Selbak also received the award for Outstanding Artistic Achievement for her work on the film.

== Cast ==
- Sheetal Sheth as Nikki
- Angela Zahra as Amira
- Mercedes Mason as Leila
- Madeleine Tabar as Samira
- Erick Avari as Mr. Qasim
- Garen Boyajian as Jamal
- Christopher Maleki as Mehdi
- Sammy Sheik as Ali
- Andrew J. Ferranti as Hafiz
- Silvi Sebastian as Aunt Fatima
- Desmond Faison as Wes
- Andria Carpenter as Little Nikki
- Lexi Greene as Little Amira
- Chelsea Gray as Shoshana
- Anne Bedian as Farridah
