= Looking for Comedy in the Muslim World =

- Theatrical release poster
- Directed by: Albert Brooks
- Written by: Albert Brooks
- Produced by: Herb Nanas
- Starring: Albert Brooks; John Carroll Lynch; Sheetal Sheth; Jon Tenney; Fred Dalton Thompson
- Cinematography: Thomas E. Ackerman
- Edited by: Anita Brandt-Burgoyne
- Music by: Michael Giacchino
- Production company: Shangri-La Entertainment
- Distributed by: Warner Independent Pictures
- Release dates: December 15, 2005 (Dubai International Film Festival); January 20, 2006 (United States)
- Running time: 98 minutes
- Country: United States
- Language: English
- Budget: $10 million
- Box office: $902,312

Looking for Comedy in the Muslim World is a 2005 American comedy film starring and directed by Albert Brooks. It was shown at the Dubai International Film Festival.

== Synopsis ==
Albert Brooks, a Jewish-American comedian, is asked by the United States government to travel to India and Pakistan to find out "what makes Muslims laugh." References are made to Brooks's earlier films, including Finding Nemo, Lost In America and Defending Your Life, along with his earlier stand-up comedy material.

Upon reaching India, Brooks begins interviewing Indians and gathering material for the 500-page essay expected of him from the government. He is aided by two agents (who actually help very little) and an Indian woman named Maya (Sheetal Sheth), who was hired as his assistant.

Brooks' interviews and a failed stand-up performance begin to attract the attention of the Indian government, who fear he is a spy of some sort. Unable to get a visa, Brooks illegally enters Pakistan for four hours to interview several fledgling Pakistani comedians, the Indian government becomes even more paranoid, increasing border control. This action causes alarm to Pakistan, who responds with security measures of their own.

As tension between the countries grows, the American government orders Brooks to leave the country and return to America. It is later said that the tension between Pakistan and India is resolved after they learn that everything was Brooks' fault. It is also revealed that Maya sent what was written of the report to Washington, but it received no recognition.

== Cast ==
- Albert Brooks as Himself
- Amy Ryan as Emily
- Sheetal Sheth as Maya
- Fred Dalton Thompson as Himself
- Penny Marshall as Herself
- Marco Khan as Pakistani Comedian

== Reception ==
The film received mixed reviews from critics. According to Rotten Tomatoes, it holds a 43% rating based on one hundred-nine reviews. The site's consensus states: "Although the premise seems ripe for laughs, Albert Brooks isn't ruthless or clever enough to pull it off." On Metacritic, the film has a weighted average score of 53 out of 100 based on 35 reviews, indicating "mixed or average reviews."

In a positive review, Nathan Rabin wrote in The A.V. Club, "Looking succeeds smashingly both as a comedy and as a savvy deconstruction of comedy. It's equally concerned with getting laughs and exploring how culture and language affect the way people process humor."

== See also ==
- Humour in Islam
