= Rohit Vyas =

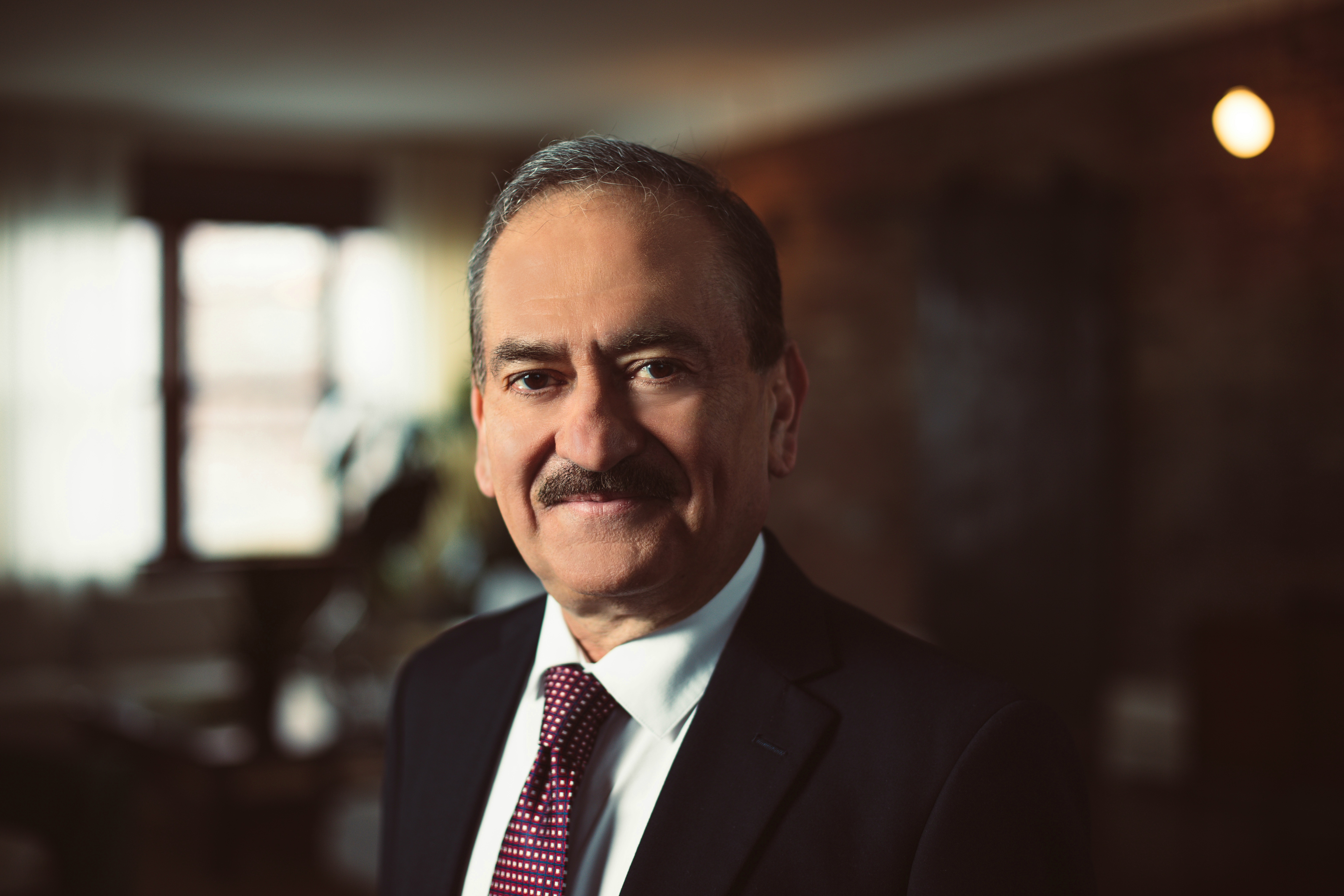
- Education: University of Delhi; American University
- Occupation: Broadcast journalist
- Years active: 1979–present
- Spouse: Isha Vyas
- Children: 2

Rohit Vyas is an Emmy-nominated documentary filmmaker and independent broadcast journalist recognized for his extensive coverage of the South Asian diaspora in North America and international affairs focusing on South Asia and the United States. He has been active in both print and broadcast media for a significant period, distinguishing himself as the longest-serving Indian American journalist in this field.

== Journalism career ==
A member of the United Nations Correspondents Association for over 40 years, he continues to be an independent broadcaster, media consultant and political commentator, focusing on international affairs.

In April 1993, Vyas was appointed news director and principal news anchor by Indian superstar Amitabh Bachchan for the actor's then new television channel, TV ASIA. He continued in that role with the added title of senior vice president through October 2019 while helming the English nightly news and two interview shows titled Between the Lines with Rohit Vyas and Face to Face.

Prior to that, Vyas was the principal news anchor and news director of Vision of Asia News from 1987 to 1993. From 1977 to 1979, Vyas was the Editor of News India, a New York-based ethnic newspaper with a national circulation in the United States. In 1979 he became the editor of the oldest Indian American newspaper in the United States, India Abroad. He was with the organization until 1982. In 1982, Rohit Vyas established, and became the Editor of, International Observer, a foreign affairs publication, which focused on international diplomacy around the globe and the United Nations.

== Career Highlights ==
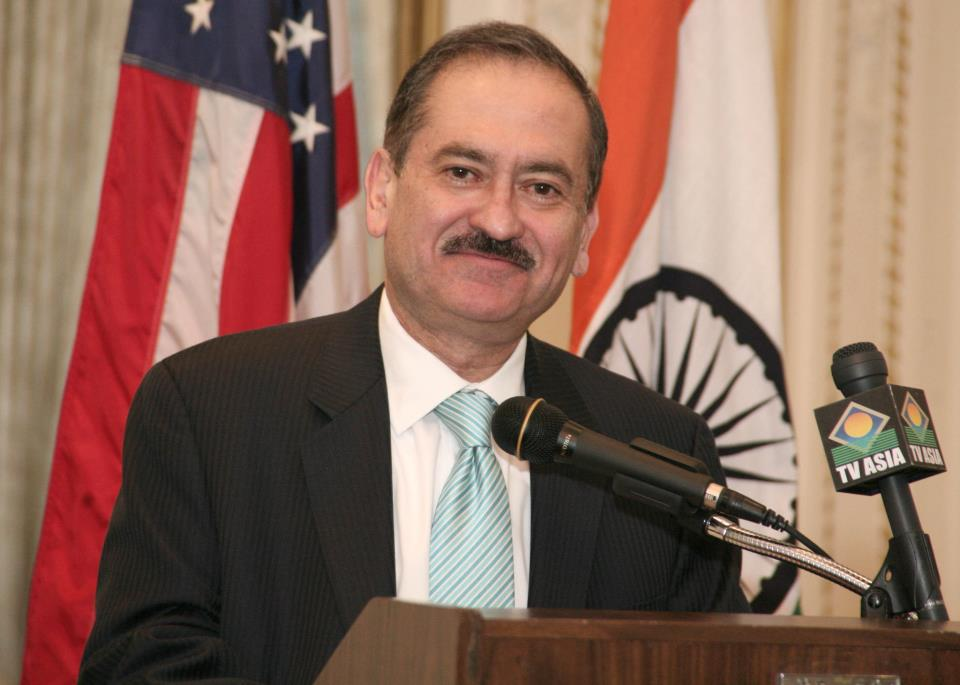
Vyas in 2015

In 2025, Rohit Vyas received two Emmy nominations for his documentary, DESTINATION OAK TREE ROAD. The nominations for DESTINATION OAK TREE ROAD were in the categories of Documentary Historical and Presenter/Narrator (Rohit Vyas).

2000, Vyas was a part of the White House media delegation during President Bill Clinton’s visit to South Asia, the Middle East, and Switzerland. Prior to that, in 1994, at the invitation of Prime Minister P.V. Narasimha Rao, Vyas became the first American journalist to be an official member of an Indian Prime Minister’s media delegation on his visit to the United States.

Throughout his career, Vyas has done a number of high-profile interviews with world leaders, politicians, sports figures and other celebrities. As the longest-serving Indian-American journalist in North America, Vyas' news programs served over three generations of South Asian-Americans.

== Public Service ==
Rohit Vyas has a storied history in public service. From 1993 to 1995, he was on an informal Asian American advisory group for the New York Times.

From 1994 to 2001, Vyas served on the Asian American Pacific Advisory Council for New Jersey Governor Christine Whitman. His affiliation with New Jersey politics continued and in 2001, he moderated the first New Jersey Gubernatorial debate for the Asian American community between Democrat Jim McGreevey and Republican Bret Schundler. In a 2017 interview with Vyas, then New Jersey gubernatorial candidate Phil Murphy committed to name an Indian-American or South Asian-American as attorney general. In January 2018, Gurinder Grewal was sworn in as the first Sikh-American and second South Asian (after Kamala Harris in California in 2011) attorney general of a U.S. state.

Vyas was the emcee for the Indian American community’s gala reception in New York City in honor of then presidential candidate Hillary Clinton.

From 1989 and for 21 years thereafter, Rohit Vyas was the Master of Ceremonies for the annual India Day Parade in New York City, the biggest event outside of India commemorating Indian Independence.

He was also the Master of Ceremonies for major programs organized by leading associations of the Indian American community, including the annual convention of the American Association of Physicians of Indian Origin (AAPI), the annual Deepavali Festival hosted by the Association of Indians in America, the annual galas of Share and Care Foundation, the Nargis Dutt Foundation and the Wheels Global Foundation among many others.

== Awards ==
Rohit Vyas has been honored by several government and non-government entities, including the New Jersey State Assembly, New York City, Nassau County, NY, the National Federation of Indian Associations and the Federation of Indian Associations (NY Tri-State), among others. Recent lifetime achievement awards were awarded by Global Organization of People of Indian Origin (GOPIO) and Indo-American Press Club.

== See also ==
- Indian Americans
- Gujarati Americans
- Indians in the New York City metropolitan region
- New Yorkers in journalism
