= Sonny (2002 film) =

2002 American film by Nicolas Cage

- Promotional poster
- Directed by: Nicolas Cage
- Written by: John Carlen
- Produced by: Paul Brooks; Nicolas Cage; Norman Golightly
- Starring: James Franco; Brenda Blethyn; Harry Dean Stanton; Mena Suvari; Josie Davis
- Cinematography: Barry Markowitz
- Edited by: Howard E. Smith
- Music by: Clint Mansell
- Production companies: Gold Circle Films; Saturn Films
- Distributed by: Samuel Goldwyn Films
- Release date: December 27, 2002
- Running time: 110 minutes
- Country: United States
- Language: English
- Budget: $4 million
- Box office: $132,221

Sonny (aka Pony Rides) is a 2002 American crime drama film starring James Franco, Harry Dean Stanton, Brenda Blethyn, Mena Suvari and Josie Davis. Based on a screenplay by John Carlen, the film marked the directorial debut of Nicolas Cage, who makes a cameo appearance. It was co-produced by Cage's production company Saturn Films.

== Plot ==
Sonny (Franco) is the son of Jewel (Blethyn), who runs a small brothel in the early 1980s New Orleans, Louisiana. Sonny returns home from the army, staying with his mother while waiting to start the job a army buddy of his promised him. Jewel tries to convince Sonny to return to work for her as he had before the navy, saying many of his old clients still miss him and that he was the best gigolo she had ever had.

Sonny repeatedly turns her down, wanting to leave that life behind. However, the promised job never materializes, and he is forced to return to working for his mother. Jewel has recently recruited a new girl to the brothel, Carol (Suvari), who meets Sonny and falls in love with him. They talk of getting out together.

One of Carol's clients, an older man, proposes to her. She initially declines, hoping to go away with Sonny. She and Sonny fall out as he fails to try to get out of the business. Instead, he becomes increasingly introverted and depressed, with occasional outbursts as he looks for more work. Ultimately, Carol accepts the marriage proposal, and Sonny unravels as he realizes his father—upon his death—had been with Sonny his whole life but declined to reveal himself for fear of being thought a loser, and Sonny and Carol fail to live happily ever after.

== Cast ==
- James Franco as Sonny
- Brenda Blethyn as Jewel
- Harry Dean Stanton as Henry
- Mena Suvari as Carol
- Seymour Cassel as Albert
- Josie Davis as Gretchen
- Nicolas Cage as Acid Yellow
- Brenda Vaccaro as Meg
- Marc Coppola as Jimmy at Mattie's

== Reception ==
The film was poorly received upon release, with a 21% rating on review aggregator Rotten Tomatoes based on 28 reviews. The site's consensus states: "Sonny is sunk by debuting director Nicolas Cage's evident inability to locate the heart of his movie's story — or properly modulate his cast's performances." Metacritic, which uses a weighted average, assigned the film a score of 31 out of 100, based on 9 critics, indicating "generally unfavorable" reviews.

However, Tommy Wiseau is a fan of the movie, and Franco's performance in it gave Wiseau faith in Franco's ability to portray him respectfully in The Disaster Artist.

== See also ==
- Male prostitution in the arts
- List of directorial debuts
