= Jook-sing =

Term for person of Chinese descent who adopts Western cultural norms

- Chinese: 竹升
- Jyutping: zuk1 sing1
Transcriptions
Yue: Cantonese
- Yale Romanization: jūk sīng
- Jyutping: zuk1 sing1
- IPA: [tsʊ́k sɪ́ŋ]

Jook-sing or zuk-sing (竹升) is a Cantonese term for an overseas Chinese person who was born in the West, or a Chinese person who more readily or strongly identifies with Western culture than traditional Chinese culture.

== Etymology ==
The term jook-sing evolved from zuk-gong (竹槓/竹杠; zhúgàng in Mandarin) which means a "bamboo pole" or "rod". Since gong (杠) is a Cantonese homophone of the inauspicious word 降 which means "descend" or "downward", it is replaced with sing (升), which means "ascend" or "upward".

The stem of the bamboo plant is hollow and compartmentalized; thus water poured in one end does not flow out of the other end. The metaphor is that jook-sings are not part of either culture; water within the jook-sing does not flow and connect to either end. In Cantonese, as 通 can means both "flow-through" and "understanding", while 頭 can means both "head"/"end" and side, the follow-up context phrase is "兩頭都不通" - lit "cannot get through both end" and "do not have understanding on both sides".

The term may or may not be derogatory. Use of the term predates World War II.

== Modern term ==
=== North American usage ===
In the United States and Canada, the term refers to fully Westernized American-born or Canadian-born Chinese. The term originates from Cantonese slang in the United States. Jook-sing persons are categorized as having Western-centric identities, values and culture. The term also refers to similar Chinese individuals in Australia, Malaysia, Singapore, and New Zealand.

=== Related colloquialisms ===
- Banana (Chinese: 香蕉人/香蕉仔; pinyin: xiāngjiāo rén / xiāngjiāo zǎi; Jyutping: hoeng1 ziu1 jan4 / hoeng1 ziu1 zai2) and Twinkie (based on the snack produced by American company Hostess): referencing the yellow on the outside and white on the inside; may be used as a pejorative term or as a non-pejorative term.
- FOB (Fresh Off the Boat): antonym of jook-sing. Typically meant to indicate a Chinese-born person who propagates excessively Chinese stereotypes while living in the West.

== See also ==
- Lost Years: A People's Struggle for Justice
- Overseas Chinese
  American Chinese
  British Chinese
  Chinese Canadian
  Chinese Australian
  Chinese New Zealander
- American-born Chinese
- Third culture kid

== Bibliography ==
- Louie, Emma Woo (1998). Chinese American Names; Tradition and Transition. Foreword by Him Mark Lai. Jefferson: McFarland and Company. ISBN 978-0-7864-0418-6. OCLC 37705342.
- Lee, Douglas W. (1980). Chinese American History and Historiography: The Musings of a Jook-Sing. OCLC 80582576.
