= Mercedes Mason =

American actress (born 1982)

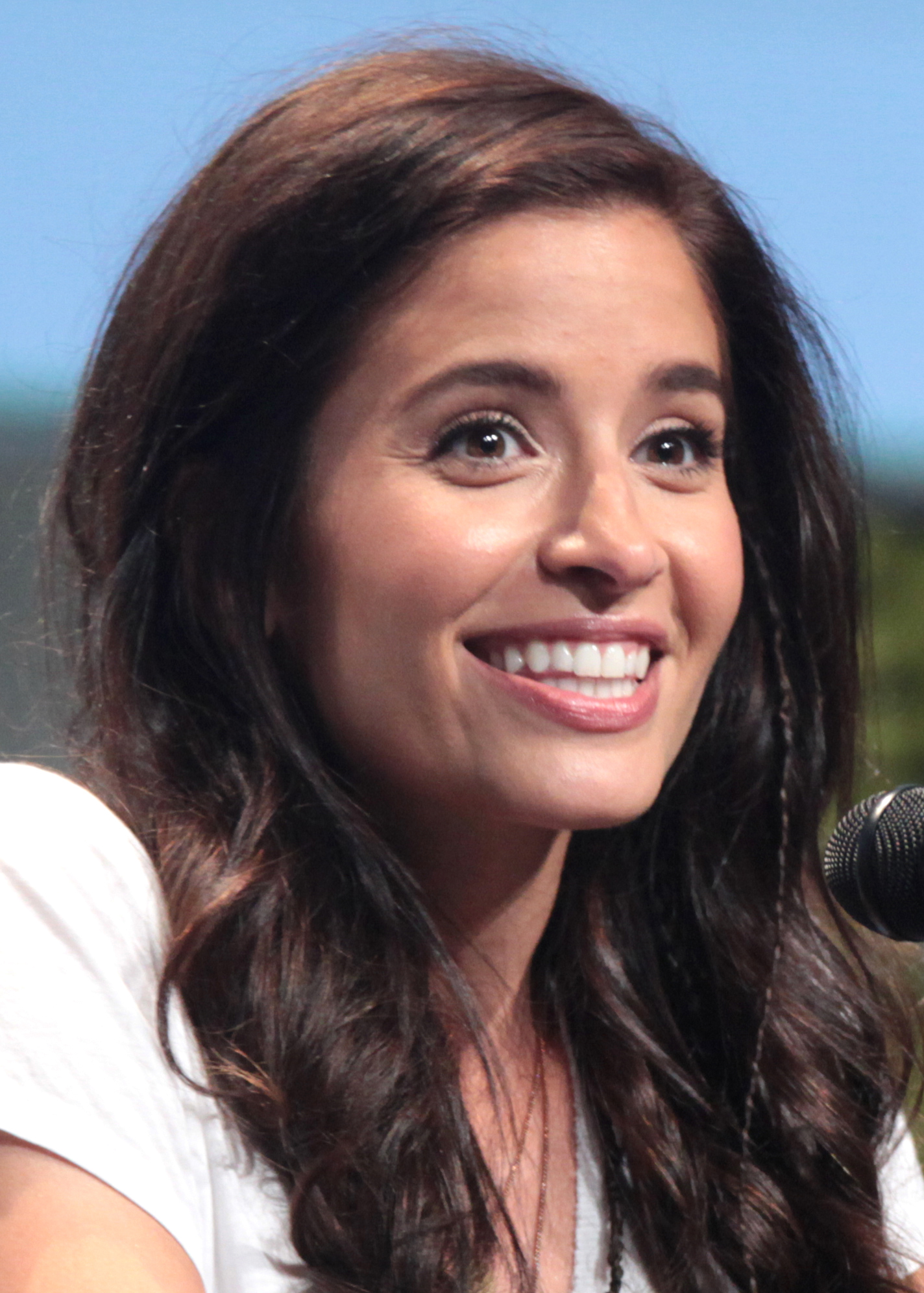
- Mason at the 2015 San Diego Comic-Con
- Born: Mercedes Masöhn; March 3, 1982 (age 44); Linköping, Sweden
- Citizenship: Sweden; United States
- Occupation: Actress
- Years active: 2004–present
- Spouse: David Denman (m. 2014)
- Children: 2

Mercedes Mason (previously Mercedes Masöhn; 3 March 1982) is a Swedish-born American actress. She played the role of Zondra in the television series Chuck, and Isabel Zambada in the procedural drama The Finder. She also starred in the 2011 American horror film Quarantine 2: Terminal, portrayed Louise Leonard in the supernatural drama series 666 Park Avenue (2012–2013), played Talia Del Campo in NCIS: Los Angeles, and was a regular on AMC's television series Fear the Walking Dead from 2015 to 2017. In 2018 she played Captain Zoe Andersen in the ABC Police crime drama The Rookie.

== Early life ==
Mason was born in 1982 in Linköping, Sweden, and grew up in the neighborhood of Ryd. Her family had emigrated from Iran. She has one sister. She moved to the United States with her family at the age of 12 and was raised in the Chicago area.

== Career ==
Mason started her career as Mercedes Masöhn on television called the Guyattwith a minor one-episode role in the daytime soap opera One Life to Live in 2005; she returned to the series for two episodes in 2006 as the character Neery. From 2008 to 2011, Mason had various one-episode appearances in series such as NCIS, CSI: NY and Castle. She had her main role debut in film as Jenny in Quarantine 2: Terminal, the 2011 found footage horror movie sequel to Quarantine. Prior to that, she appeared in minor roles in The Break-Up (2006) and Red Sands (2009). In 2011, she also starred in the drama film Three Veils. Throughout the following years, Mason played minor or supporting roles in various movies.

In 2012, Mason was one of two lead actresses in The Finder during its lone season. She played Deputy U.S. Marshal Isabel Zambada, the romantic interest of title character Walter Sherman (Geoff Stults). Both she and Maddie Hasson filled the void left by the departure of Saffron Burrows, the female lead in the series' backdoor pilot which was the 19th episode of Season 6 of Bones. She also co-starred on the ABC supernatural drama series 666 Park Avenue in 2012, which was canceled midway through its season.

In the spring of 2014, Mason debuted her role of DEA Special Agent Talia Del Campo on the CBS series NCIS: Los Angeles, appearing in seven episodes from 2014 to 2022. In August 2015, she debuted in her role as Ofelia Salazar, on the Walking Dead companion series Fear the Walking Dead.

In 2018, she played Captain Zoe Andersen in the first season of the ABC series The Rookie.

== Personal life ==
In 2010, Mason started dating actor David Denman; the couple married in 2014. Their first child was born on 10 January 2018, a son named Caius Kane. Their second child, Sagan Cyrus, was born in May 2021.

Mason came out as bisexual in December 2019.

Mason is a naturalized U.S. citizen, having taken the citizenship test in April 2016.

Mason speaks English, French, Spanish, and Farsi. On the Norwegian talk show Skavlan on 30 September 2016, she said that she no longer speaks Swedish but understands it.

== Filmography ==
=== Film ===
Year	Title	Role	Notes
2006	The Break-Up	Goblet Girl	Uncredited
2009	Red Sands	Arab Woman	
2011	Quarantine 2: Terminal	Jenny	
2011	Three Veils	Leila	
2012	General Education	Bebe Simmons	
2013	Slightly Single in L.A.	Stacey	
2014	Sniper: Legacy	Sanaa Malik	
2015	Ana Maria in Novela Land	Ana Gloria	Film credits as Mercedes Mason from here on
2020	What the Night Can Do	Tasha Cole	
2020	Love by Drowning	Kazz Martin	
2023	Little Dixie	Julie Reed	
2024	Guns & Moses	Liat Rosner	

=== Television ===
Year	Title	Role	Notes
2005–2006	One Life to Live	Neely / Red Cross Nurse	3 episodes
2008	Entourage	Kara	Episode: "Return to Queens Blvd."
2009	The Law	Theresa Ramirez	Unsold television pilot
2009	The Closer	Katherine Ortega	Episode: "Blood Money"
2009	NCIS	Police Officer Heather Kincaid	Episode: "Truth or Consequences"
2009	CSI: NY	Frankie Tyler	Episode: "It Happened to Me"
2009–2010	Three Rivers	Vanessa	4 episodes
2010	Castle	Marina Casillas	Episode: "He's Dead, She's Dead"
2010	All Signs of Death	Soledad	Unsold television pilot
2011	Traffic Light	Sherry	Episode: Pilot
2011	Chuck	Zondra	2 episodes
2012	The Finder	Deputy U.S. Marshal Isabel Zambada	Main role
2012	Common Law	Ellen Sandoval	2 episodes
2012–2013	666 Park Avenue	Louise Leonard	Main role
2014–2022	NCIS: Los Angeles	DEA agent Talia Del Campo	Recurring role, 7 episodes
2014	Californication	Amy Taylor Walsh	2 episodes
2014	Anger Management	Maggie	2 episodes; TV credits as Mercedes Mason from here on
2015	The Astronaut Wives Club	Dot Bingham	Episode: "Flashpoint"
2015	White City	Lizzie Ghaffari	Television film
2015–2017	Fear the Walking Dead	Ofelia Salazar	Main role (seasons 1–3)
2017	Doubt	Elena Garcia	Episode: "Clean Burn"
2018–2019, 2021	The Rookie	Captain Zoe Andersen	Main role (season 1); guest role (season 3)
2019	How to Get Away with Murder	Cora Duncan	3 episodes
2019–2020	The L Word: Generation Q	Lena	4 episodes
2021	American Horror Stories	Michelle	Episode: "Game Over"
