= ABCD (1999 film) =

- Directed by: Krutin Patel
- Written by: Krutin Patel; James McManus
- Story by: Krutin Patel
- Produced by: Naju Patel; Krutin Patel
- Starring: Madhur Jaffrey; Faran Tahir; Sheetal Sheth
- Cinematography: Milton Kam
- Edited by: Ravi Subramanian
- Music by: Deirdre Broderick
- Production company: Laxmi Pictures
- Distributed by: Eros Entertainment
- Country: United States
- Language: English

ABCD is a 1999 American film directed by Krutin Patel starring Madhur Jaffrey, Faran Tahir and Sheetal Sheth. The film was screened at various film festivals including the BFI London Film Festival and Houston Film Festival, where it won the award for Best Independent Film.

== Cast ==
- Madhur Jaffrey as Anju Mehta
- Faran Tahir as Raj Mehta
- Sheetal Sheth as Nina Mehta
- Aasif Mandvi as Ashok
- David Ari as Brian
- Jennifer Dorr White as Julia
- Adriane Forlana Erdos as Tejal

== Reception ==
Kevin Thomas of the Los Angeles Times wrote, "“ABCD” is an acronym for American-Born Confused Dashi [sic] (Indian), but there’s nothing confused about this assured and fully realized first film by Krutin Patel". On the contrary, Stephen Holden of The New York Times wrote, "Unlike American Desi, ABCD doesn't make light of its characters' conflicts, nor does it try to resolve them with feel-good formulaic solutions". Peter Travers of Rolling Stone wrote, " In this funny, touching and haunting film, Patel cuts through stereotypes to show the hard truths of straddling two cultures".
