= Aasif Mandvi =

British actor

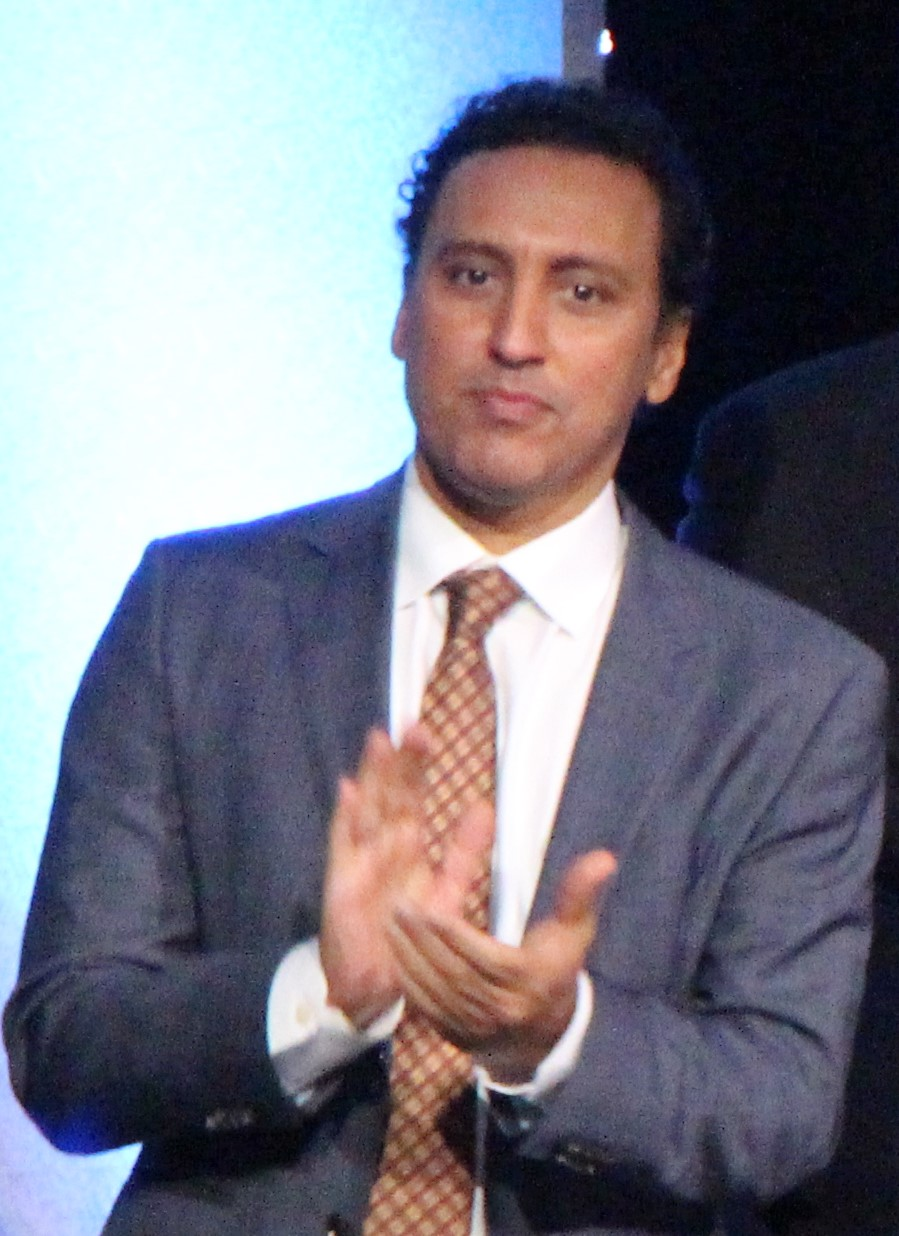
- Mandvi in 2016
- Born: Aasif Hakim Mandviwala; Bombay, Maharashtra, India
- Education: Chamberlain High School; University of South Florida (BA)
- Occupations: Actor; comedian; writer
- Years active: 1988–present
- Spouse: Shaifali Puri (m. 2017)
- Children: 1
- Website: aasifmandvi.com

Aasif Hakim Mandviwala, known professionally as Aasif Mandvi (/ˈɑːsɪf ˈmɑːndvi/, AH-sif MAHND-vee), is an Indian-born British actor. He was a correspondent on The Daily Show from 2006 to 2017. Mandvi's other television work includes the HBO comedy series The Brink and the CBS/Paramount+ psychological drama Evil. His film roles include playing Mr. Aziz in Spider-Man 2 and Commander Zhao in The Last Airbender. His stage work includes appearing on Broadway as Ali Hakim in Oklahoma! and in productions of Disgraced (2012), which won the Pulitzer Prize in 2013.

== Early life ==
Mandvi was born in Bombay, in Maharashtra, India, into a Gujarati Muslim family of the Dawoodi Bohra caste.

His family moved to England, when he was a year old, settling in the West Yorkshire city of Bradford. His father, Hakim, who had originally come to work in textiles research at Bradford University, later ran a corner shop. His mother, Fatima, was a nurse. Mandvi attended the independent Woodhouse Grove School in Apperley Lane, and he identifies as a "working-class kid from Bradford".

In the early 80s, his father grew frustrated with Margaret Thatcher's administration and moved his family to the United States, settling in Tampa, Florida; when Mandvi was 16. He attended Chamberlain High School in Hillsborough County, graduating in 1984.

== Career ==
=== Early ===
After graduating from the University of South Florida with a degree in theatre, Mandvi worked as a performer at Disney-MGM Studios at Walt Disney World Resort, and Universal Studios Florida. He later moved to New York City, where he began appearing in off-Broadway productions. During this time, he was active in the band Cowboys and Indian. He won an Obie Award for his one-man show Sakina's Restaurant.

On Broadway, Mandvi appeared as Ali Hakim in the 2002 production of Oklahoma! directed by Trevor Nunn.

Mandvi played Melchior in On the Razzle by Tom Stoppard at the Williamstown Theatre Festival and appeared in the docudrama Guantanamo: Honor Bound to Defend Freedom at the Culture Project. In 2012, Mandvi starred in Disgraced at Lincoln Center's Claire Tow Theater. He played the lead role of Amir, a Pakistani- American lawyer struggling with his identity and Islam in the drama by Ayad Akhtar. The play won the 2013 Pulitzer Prize for Drama. Mandvi was nominated for a Lucille Lortel Award for his performance.

=== Television ===
Mandvi made his television debut as a doorman at the Miami Biltmore Hotel in the episode "Line of Fire" of the series Miami Vice. He has appeared in television shows including ER, The Sopranos, Sex and the City, CSI: Crime Scene Investigation, Oz, Ed, The Bedford Diaries, Jericho, Sleeper Cell and various editions of Law & Order, including Criminal Intent, Law & Order: Special Victims Unit and Trial by Jury.

In 2006, Mandvi auditioned for The Daily Show. He was hired immediately and appeared on the show the same day. Mandvi became a regular correspondent in 2007. He often appears in segments satirizing and commenting on Islamic, Middle-Eastern, and South-Asian-related issues.

In 2013, Mandvi was cast in a recurring role on the FOX romantic comedy, Us & Them.

In October 2013, during a segment on The Daily Show, Mandvi interviewed Don Yelton of the North Carolina Republican Party office. Comments Yelton made then resulted in his resigning after the interview was aired.

Beginning in June 2015, Mandvi portrayed Rafiq Massoud in the HBO comedy series The Brink. In April 2015, Mandvi appeared on Person of Interest as Sulaiman Khan, the CEO of a software security firm. He was the lead actor, co-writer and producer of the web series Halal in the Family, which premiered on Funny or Die in 2015.

In 2016, Mandvi joined the climate change documentary show Years of Living Dangerously as one of its celebrity correspondents.

Beginning in 2017, Mandvi appeared in three episodes of the Netflix series A Series of Unfortunate Events as Montgomery "Uncle Monty" Montgomery, a herpetologist and distant relative of the Baudelaire children.

In 2019, Mandvi was cast in the Robert and Michelle King supernatural drama series Evil on CBS as Ben Shakir, a carpenter who works as a technical expert, equipment handler and debunker of supernatural phenomena.

=== Film ===
Mandvi played minor roles in the films The Siege and Die Hard with a Vengeance as well as the title role in Merchant Ivory Productions' film The Mystic Masseur. He had a major supporting role in the independent film American Chai, playing the lead character's roommate, "Engineering Sam." He played the doctor who diagnosed Paul Vitti's (Robert De Niro) panic attacks in Analyze This, and had a role as Mr. Aziz of "Joe's Pizza" in Spider-Man 2. He was also in commercials by Domino's Pizza and the Financial Industry Regulatory Authority (FINRA). He played the tone deaf doorman Khan in Music and Lyrics.

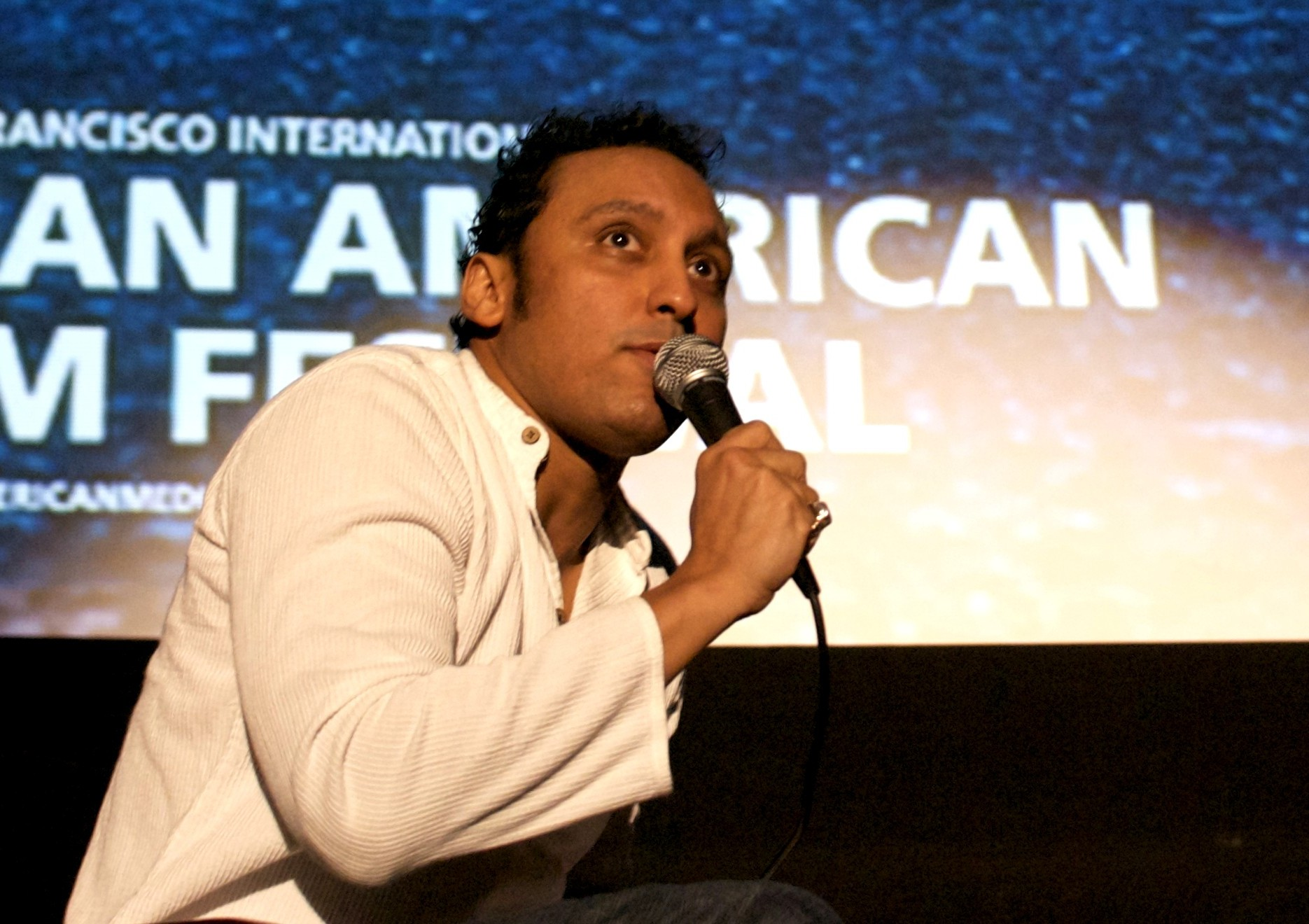
Mandvi at the 2010 San Francisco International Asian American Film Festival.

Mandvi played a dentist alongside Ricky Gervais in the 2008 romantic comedy Ghost Town, as well as office employee Bob Spaulding in The Proposal, starring Sandra Bullock. Today's Special, which Mandvi co-wrote with Jonathan Bines, premiered at the London Film Festival in October 2009 and New York's Mahindra Indo-American Arts Council Film Festival on 11 November 2009. He appeared in It's Kind of a Funny Story, a coming-of-age film written and directed by Anna Boden with Ryan Fleck, adapted from the 2006 novel by Ned Vizzini. He also co-starred as a Guantanamo captive in the film The Response, a script based on the transcripts of Combatant Status Review Tribunals convened in Guantanamo in 2004. In M. Night Shyamalan's The Last Airbender (released in 2010) he played a major role as Commander Zhao. Mandvi played the role of Mr. Chetty in the 2013 comedy The Internship and portrayed Ash Vasudevan in the 2014 film Million Dollar Arm.

== Personal life ==
On 27 August 2017, Mandvi married his girlfriend of three years, Shaifali Puri, an author and humanitarian, at The Fox Theatre in Atlanta, GA. They have one son, born in 2020.

Mandvi has been diagnosed with chronic tinnitus.

In June 2019, he was awarded an Honorary Doctor of Humane Letters Degree by the Macaulay Honors College after delivering the commencement speech that year.

=== Charity work and advocacy ===
Mandvi is involved with disaster-relief organizations such as the charity initiative Relief 4 Pakistan, which assists in flood relief in Pakistan. In 2010, he hosted the "Stand Up for Religious Freedom" comedy event to raise money for the organization. He is also a supporter of the Endometriosis Foundation of America.

== Filmography ==
=== Actor ===
==== Film ====
Year	Film	Role	Notes
1990	No Retreat, No Surrender 3: Blood Brothers	Terrorist	
1995	Die Hard with a Vengeance	Arab Cabbie	
1996	Eddie	Mohammed	
1998	The Siege	Khalil Saleh	
1999	Hook'd Up	Indian Guy	
1999	Analyze This	Dr. Shulman	
1999	Gofer	Gorby	
1999	Random Hearts	Electronics Store Salesman	
1999	ABCD	Ashok	
2001	3 A.M.	Singh	
2001	American Chai	Engineering Sam	
2001	Peroxide Passion	Beaumond	
2002	The Mystic Masseur	Ganesh Ramsumair	
2002	Book of Kings	Dr. Mitra	Short film
2003	Undermind	Shark/Roger	
2004	Spider-Man 2	Mr. Aziz	
2005	Sorry, Haters	Hassan	
2005	The War Within	Abdul	
2006	Freedomland	Dr. Anil Chatterjee	
2007	Music and Lyrics	Khan	
2008	Eavesdrop	Don	
2008	Pretty Bird	Ted the Banker	
2008	The Understudy	Sarfras	
2008	Ghost Town	Dr. Prashar	
2009	The Proposal	Bob Spaulding	
2009	Today's Special	Samir	Also screenwriter
2010	It's Kind of a Funny Story	Dr. Mahmoud	
2010	The Last Airbender	Commander Zhao	
2011	Margin Call	Ramesh Shah	
2011	Dark Horse	Mahmoud	
2012	Premium Rush	Raj	
2012	The Dictator	Doctor	
2012	Ruby Sparks	Cyrus Modi	
2013	Movie 43	Robert	Segment "iBabe"
2013	The Internship	Mr. Roger Chetty	
2013	Gods Behaving Badly	Maxwell	
2014	Million Dollar Arm	Ash Vasudevan	
2014	Lennon or McCartney	Himself	Short documentary film; interview clip
2016	Mother's Day	Russell	
2016	Undecided: The Movie	Roger Ayeels	
2019	Drunk Parents	Nigel	
2019	Human Capital	Godeep	
2022	Crush	Coach Murray	
2022	Paws of Fury: The Legend of Hank	Ichiro (voice)	
2023	The Magician's Elephant	The King (voice)	
2026	Ray Gunn		Voice role

==== Television ====
Year	Show	Role	Notes
1988	Miami Vice	Doorman	Episode: "Line of Fire"
1995	New York Undercover	Omar	Episode: "The Smoking Section"
1995	The Cosby Mysteries	Cabbie	Episode: "Big Brother Is Watching"
1995–1998	Law & Order	Peanut Vendor / Gulab Singh / Technician / Khan	4 episodes
1996	Jake's Women	Driver	Television film
1996	Nash Bridges	Aziz Kadim	Episode: "Trackdown"
1998	Dellaventura	Aasif	Episode: "The Human Factor"
2000	Welcome to New York	Doorman	Episode: "Jim Gets an Apartment"
2000	Law & Order: Special Victims Unit	Professor Husseini	Episode: "Honor"
2000	CSI: Crime Scene Investigation	Dr. Leever	Episode: "Anonymous"
2001	Sex and the City	Dmitri	Episode: "My Motherboard, My Self"
2002	Oz	Dr. Faraj	2 episodes
2003	Ed	Buyer	Episode: "Goodbye Stuckeyville"
2004	Law & Order: Criminal Intent	Sateesh	Episode: "Inert Dwarf"
2004	Tanner on Tanner	Salim Barik	4 episodes
2006	Law & Order: Trial by Jury	Judge Samir Patel	Episode: "Bang & Blame, Baby Boom"
2006	The Sopranos	Dr. Abu Bilal	Episode: "Kaisha"
2006	Sleeper Cell	Khalid	Episode: "Al-Baqara"
2006–2007	ER	Manish	3 episodes
2006–2008	Jericho	Dr. Kenchy Dhuwalia	8 episodes
2006–2015	The Daily Show	Himself	188 episodes
2010	King of the Hill	Mike Patel (voice)	Episode: "When Joseph Met Lori, and Made Out with Her in the Janitor's Closet"
2011	Curb Your Enthusiasm	Man in Elevator	Episode: "Larry vs. Michael J. Fox"
2014	Us & Them	Dave Coaches	Episode: "Crunch & Brunch"
2015	Madam Secretary	Prince Yousif Obaid	Episode: "Chains of Command"
2015	Person of Interest	Suleiman Khan	Episode: "Search and Destroy"
2015	The Brink	Rafiq Massoud	10 episodes; also producer and writer
2015	Halal in the Family	Aasif Qu'osby	Web series
2015	Jake and the Never Land Pirates	Pirate Pharaoh (voice)	3 episodes
2016–2019	Elena of Avalor	King Raja (voice)	2 episodes
2016	Another Period	Parshwall	Episode: "The Prince and the Pauper"
2017	Younger	Jay Malick	4 episodes
2017	Shut Eye	Pazhani "Paz" Kapoor	6 episodes
2017	National Geographic Explorer	Host	Season 10 Episode 2
2017	The Problem with Apu	Himself	Documentary film
2017–2018	A Series of Unfortunate Events	Dr. Montgomery Montgomery (Uncle Monty)	3 episodes
2018	Explained	Narrator (voice)	Episode: "Cricket, explained"
2018–2020	Blue Bloods	Samar "Sam" Chatwal	Recurring, season 9
2019–2024	Evil	Ben Shakir	Main cast
2019	This Way Up	Vish	Main cast
2019	Ghostwriter	Bagheera (voice)	2 episodes
2019	Room 104	Eugene Hill	Episode: "The Specimen Collector"
2020	The Boss Baby: Back in Business	OCB Corporate Consultant (voice)	Season 4: Episodes 6 & 10–12
2020–2022	Mira, Royal Detective	Sahil (voice)	18 episodes
2021	Archer	Cornelius Varma (voice)	Episode: "London Time"
2022	Would I Lie to You? (USA)	Host	
2026	The Miniature Wife	Martin Mucklow	
2026	The Terror: Devil in Silver	Dr. Anand	Main cast

=== Writer ===
Year	Film	Notes
2009	Today's Special	

=== Stage ===
==== Actor ====
Year	Title	Role	Notes
1993	Suburbia	Norman Chaudry	
1995	Death Defying Acts	Delivery Boy	In one-act "Hotline"
1997	Crosscurrents	Paul	
1998	Sakina's Restaurant		One man play
2002	Oklahoma!	Ali Hakim	Revival
2012	Disgraced	Amir Kapoor	Lincoln Center/LCT3

==== Writer ====
Year	Title	Notes
1998	Sakina's Restaurant	

=== Radio drama/podcast ===
==== Actor ====
Year	Title	Role	Notes
2021	Marvel's Wastelanders: Star-Lord	Rattlesnake Pete	

== Published works ==
- Mandvi, Aasif (2014). No Land's Man. Chronicle Books. ISBN 978-1452107912. The book has been adapted for the American-Indian-Bangladeshi film No Land's Man directed by Mostofa Sarwar Farooki.
