= American-born confused desi =

Cultural slang

"American-born confused desi" (ABCD) is an informal term and ethnic generational identifier used to refer to South Asian Americans, particularly of Indian, Pakistani, or Bangladeshi origin, born or raised in the United States, in contrast to those who were born overseas and later settled in the US.

== Neologism ==
"ABCD" or "American-born confused desi" has become a polarizing factor in the South Asian diaspora in the United States, with first-generation immigrant parents and young South Asians of second or later generations. Though the term was originally coined in reference to Indian Americans, it has been adopted by the South Asian diaspora at large. The term desi comes from the Hindi word देश (dēś, lit. 'homeland'). The word has its origin in Sanskrit, dēśa, and is pronounced desh in the Bengali language. Desi means 'of the homeland' and is generally used by diasporas of India, Pakistan and Bangladesh. The phrase is not frequently used in South Asia and not seen as a set identity as it is seen by diasporas. The term has been commonly known among diasporas since at least the 1980s. The term confused is used to describe the psychological state of many second-generation South Asian Americans who struggle to balance values and traditions taught at home with attitudes and practices that are more conducive to the culture of The United States.

The longer and lesser known form American born confused desi, emigrated from Gujarat, house in Jersey (A–J) is occasionally seen.

== Cultural implications ==
Among South Asian Americans, the term may be considered divisive, as first generation South Asian Americans use it to criticize the Americanization and the lack of belonging to Indian Asian culture they perceive in their second-generation peers or children. At times, it could also be used to mock their outdated perception of their country of origin. Writer Vijay Prashad describes the term as "ponderous and overused" and notes it as one of the mechanisms by which new immigrants attempt to make second-generation youth feel "culturally inadequate and unfinished".

== Movies ==
The term American-born confused desi appeared in the movies ABCD (1999) and American Desi (2001). ABCD: American-Born Confused Desi is a 2013 Malayalam language movie released in India. The film narrates the journey of two young American Malayalis to their motherland, Kerala, with the title based on the term American-born confused desi. The film was remade in Telugu in 2019 with the same name.

== Related identity terms ==
American-Born Confused Desi is one of several cultural identifiers for bicultural populations in the United States. Similar terms include American-born Chinese (ABC) for Chinese Americans, Nisei for Japanese Americans, Generation Ñ for bilingual Latinos, Chicano for Mexican Americans, and Nuyorican for New York Puerto Ricans.
