= The Day Fuckers =

- Entourage episode
- Episode no.: Season 4 Episode 7
- Directed by: Mark Mylod
- Written by: Rob Weiss
- Cinematography by: Anthony Hardwick
- Editing by: Greg Featherman
- Original release date: July 29, 2007
- Running time: 29 minutes

Guest appearances
- William Forsythe as Eddie Kapowski (special guest star); Emmanuelle Chriqui as Sloan McQuewick; Dan Castellaneta as Andrew Preston; Emma Lung as Heather; Sophie Monk as Juliette; Cassidy Lehrman as Sarah Gold; Shanna Moakler as Kelsey; William Ragsdale as Frank Giovanello

Episode chronology
← Previous "The WeHo Ho"	Next → "Gary's Desk"

"The Day Fuckers" is the seventh episode of the fourth season of the American comedy-drama television series Entourage. It is the 49th overall episode of the series and was written by executive producer Rob Weiss, and directed by co-producer Mark Mylod. It originally aired on HBO on July 29, 2007.

The series chronicles the acting career of Vincent Chase, a young A-list movie star, and his childhood friends from Queens, New York City, as they attempt to further their nascent careers in Los Angeles. In the episode, the boys make a bet on whether Eric or Turtle can have sex first, while Ari desperately tries to get his son enrolled at the private school.

According to Nielsen Media Research, the episode was seen by an estimated 2.50 million household viewers and gained a 1.4/4 ratings share among adults aged 18–49. The episode received mixed reviews from critics, although Jeremy Piven received acclaim for his performance. For the episode, Jeremy Piven won Outstanding Supporting Actor in a Comedy Series at the 60th Primetime Emmy Awards.

== Plot ==
Drama (Kevin Dillon) and Turtle (Jerry Ferrara) mock Eric (Kevin Connolly) for his failure in never having sex with a girl without trying to pursuit a relationship. They decide to take a bet, in which Drama claims Turtle can have sex with a girl before Eric does.

Ari (Jeremy Piven) and Melissa (Perrey Reeves) are unable to find a new school for Jonah, after Preston (Dan Castellaneta) contacted the other private schools to warn them about Ari. Unwilling to let Jonah go to public school, Ari hires a private investigator to follow Preston for any incriminating aspect. However, he is unable to find anything about Preston, who is living a quiet and peaceful life with his family. Ari decides to go with putting Jonah in public school, but is taken aback as Jonah wants to go with his best friend to Briar Country. Desperate, he visits Preston at home, begging him to change his mind. Preston decides to allow Jonah to get enrolled, and Ari agrees in giving his son a better job at an agency.

Vince (Adrian Grenier) helps Eric by attracting two British girls, Heather (Emma Lung) and Juliette (Sophie Monk), at a hotel. As Eric bonds with Heather, he runs into Sloan (Emmanuelle Chriqui), which makes him consider in going back with her. When he asks to begin again, he is disappointed to learn she already has a boyfriend. He decides to meet with Heather, but is not interested in having sex. Turtle meets a girl, Kelsey (Shanna Moakler), in craigslist, but is annoyed that she wants to have sex with him wearing a bunny suit. He refuses to do it, prompting Drama to take the suit to have sex with Kelsey.

== Production ==
=== Development ===
The episode was written by executive producer Rob Weiss, and directed by co-producer Mark Mylod. This was Weiss' 15th writing credit, and Mylod's seventh directing credit.

== Reception ==
=== Viewers ===
In its original American broadcast, "The Day Fuckers" was seen by an estimated 2.50 million household viewers with a 1.4/4 in the 18–49 demographics. This means that 1.4 percent of all households with televisions watched the episode, while 4 percent of all of those watching television at the time of the broadcast watched it. This was a slight decrease in viewership from the previous episode, which was watched by an estimated 2.51 million household viewers with a 1.5/4 in the 18–49 demographics.

=== Critical reviews ===
"The Day Fuckers" received mixed reviews from critics. Ahsan Haque of IGN gave the episode a "good" 8.9 out of 10 and wrote, "From start to finish, this episode was not only thoroughly entertaining, but managed to deliver some of the funniest moments of the season. The visuals of Drama having sex in the bunny suit, or Ari doing another one of his crazy victory dances outside of Preston's home were truly hilarious. It was nice to get a break from the "Medellin" story arc to enjoy a simple, fun episode. Most filler episodes often lack substance, but "The Day ****ers" manages to truly stand on its own as one of the better episodes of the year."

Alan Sepinwall wrote, "This wasn't Worst. Episode. Ever. territory like, say, the trans hooker episode, but I'm just not feeling this show at all anymore." Adam Sternbergh of Vulture wrote, "All this, and an episode that's 100 percent Billy Walsh free. Maybe this show deserves seven Emmy nominations after all." Trish Wethman of TV Guide wrote, "Ari's signature victory dance was hard-won tonight, but we've probably not seen the last of this particular drama."

Paul Katz of Entertainment Weekly wrote, "I will say this was easily the best outing so far this season for the dynamic duo of Drama and Turtle. If only Entourage could find the perfect balance between plot and comic relief." Jonathan Toomey of TV Squad wrote, "I'm not sure what they were thinking with this episode. It's not that it was bad. I thought it was great - some funny moments and some loose ends tied up. It was sort of like the Vegas episode. Looking at the big picture, it doesn't have much impact on the season but it still provided a nice departure from everything else that's going on. I guess it just goes to show that Entourage can pull off something like this more than once."

Jeremy Piven submitted this episode to support his nomination for Outstanding Supporting Actor in a Comedy Series at the 60th Primetime Emmy Awards. He would win the award, marking his third win in a row for the series.
