= Gotcha (Entourage) =

- Entourage episode
- Episode no.: Season 3 Episode 16
- Directed by: Dan Attias
- Written by: Doug Ellin; Rob Weiss
- Cinematography by: Dave Perkal
- Editing by: Gregg Featherman
- Original release date: April 29, 2007
- Running time: 31 minutes

Guest appearances
- Bruce Buffer as Himself (special guest star); Chuck Liddell as Himself (special guest star); Pauly Shore as Himself (special guest star); Artie Lange as Scott Siegal (special guest star); Leslie Bibb as Laurie (special guest star); Carla Gugino as Amanda Daniels (special guest star)

Episode chronology
← Previous "Manic Monday"	Next → "Return of the King"

"Gotcha" is the sixteenth episode of the third season of the American comedy-drama television series Entourage. It is the 38th overall episode of the series and was written by series creator Doug Ellin and executive producer Rob Weiss, and directed by Dan Attias. It originally aired on HBO on April 29, 2007.

The series chronicles the acting career of Vincent Chase, a young A-list movie star, and his childhood friends from Queens, New York City, as they attempt to further their nascent careers in Los Angeles. In the episode, Drama gets into a conflict with Chuck Liddell, while Ari reunites with an old college fraternity brother, who has changed his ways. Vince and Amanda continue their relationship, unnerving Eric.

According to Nielsen Media Research, the episode was seen by an estimated 3.33 million household viewers and gained a 1.9/5 ratings share among adults aged 18–49. The episode received generally positive reviews from critics, with particular praise towards Drama's and Ari's storylines.

== Plot ==
At a restaurant, Drama (Kevin Dillon) is annoyed to run into Pauly Shore, who is conversing with Turtle (Jerry Ferrara). Turtle says that Pauly is working on Gotcha!, a reality show inspired by Punk'd, and Drama was targeted as the new victim. Drama decides to be part of the show, despite knowing about the hidden camera aspect.

Vince (Adrian Grenier) and Amanda (Carla Gugino) continue their sexual relationship, although Amanda asks for this to end so they can focus on their professional relationship. They dine with Eric (Kevin Connolly), who is disgusted upon learning of their affair. Ari (Jeremy Piven) and Melissa (Perrey Reeves) welcome Scott (Artie Lange), Ari's college fraternity brother, whom Melissa dislikes due to his history with sexual harassment. Ari is surprised by Scott, who turned his life around, will marry a woman named Laurie (Leslie Bibb), and became a millionaire by selling a stamps website. To get back at him, Ari decides to use Scott's college behavior on Lori, ruining dinner. When Melissa confronts him, he opens up about feeling that everything he did was not enough for Melissa. Melissa says she is fine with her life and they reconcile.

Drama and Turtle run into mixed martial artist Chuck Liddell at a parking lot. But Drama is convinced that Liddell is involved with Gotcha!, so he insults him in front of his daughter. However, the real prank was actually different, and Drama is scared at having angered Liddell, who later finds his address. Drama visits Liddell at a fundraiser to apologize, but he demands that he join him in a fight. As he berates him in public, Drama asks for forgiveness. However, this is revealed to also be part of Gotcha!. Relieved, Drama accepts the prank, proclaiming that he now stars in two TV pilots.

== Production ==
=== Development ===
The episode was written by series creator Doug Ellin and co-executive producer Rob Weiss, and directed by Dan Attias. This was Ellin's 25th writing credit, Weiss' 12th writing credit, and Attias' sixth directing credit.

== Reception ==
=== Viewers ===
In its original American broadcast, "Gotcha" was seen by an estimated 3.33 million household viewers with a 1.9/5 in the 18–49 demographics. This means that 1.9 percent of all households with televisions watched the episode, while 5 percent of all of those watching television at the time of the broadcast watched it. This was a 9% decrease in viewership from the previous episode, which was watched by an estimated 3.63 million household viewers with a 2.0/5 in the 18–49 demographics.

=== Critical reviews ===
"Gotcha" received generally positive reviews from critics. Ahsan Haque of IGN gave the episode a "good" 7.5 out of 10 and wrote, "While there were a few key advances, this episode felt a bit like it was mostly filler. Hopefully the pace will pick up as the rest of the season progresses."

Adam Sternbergh of Vulture wrote, "At least one plotline was promising: Drama is targeted by a Punk’d-style hidden-camera show called Gotcha!, hosted by Pauly Shore, i.e. exactly the kind of well-known but not overly employed Hollywood personality who’s always just a phone call away to do an Entourage cameo." Trish Wethman of TV Guide wrote, "Kevin Dillon is amazingly entertaining as the elder Chase brother. He is one of the reasons I keep coming back week after week since I'm not really feeling the rest of the show right now. I'm not sure if it is Vince and Ari's estrangement or what, but I do feel like something is off in these most recent episodes."

Paul Katz of Entertainment Weekly wrote, "Is mixing business and pleasure going to work? And how glad are we that the writers didn't attempt to keep the boys out of the loop about the Vince-Amanda relationship? Though it was gallant of Vince not to spill the beans, it would've been unrealistic had E not immediately known. Close friends can always tell about a new bedroom conquest." Jonathan Toomey of TV Squad wrote, "I wouldn't mind seeing her go back to her hard-ass self out of nowhere though. She melted awfully fast. That's what Vince does to the ladies though. No surprises there."

Perrey Reeves submitted this episode for consideration for Outstanding Supporting Actress in a Comedy Series at the 59th Primetime Emmy Awards.
