= The First Cut Is the Deepest (Entourage) =

- Entourage episode
- Episode no.: Season 4 Episode 2
- Directed by: Mark Mylod
- Written by: Doug Ellin
- Cinematography by: Rob Sweeney
- Editing by: Gregg Featherman
- Original release date: June 24, 2007
- Running time: 27 minutes

Guest appearances
- Anthony Michael Hall as Himself (special guest star); Dan Castellaneta as Andrew Preston; Bruce Nozick as Dr. Jeffrey Reich; Cassidy Lehrman as Sarah Gold; Stacey Travis as Secretary

Episode chronology
| ← Previous "Welcome to the Jungle" | Next → "Malibooty" |

"The First Cut is the Deepest" is the second episode of the fourth season of the American comedy-drama television series Entourage. It is the 44th overall episode of the series and was written by series creator Doug Ellin, and directed by co-producer Mark Mylod. It originally aired on HBO on June 24, 2007.

The series chronicles the acting career of Vincent Chase, a young A-list movie star, and his childhood friends from Queens, New York City, as they attempt to further their nascent careers in Los Angeles. In the episode, Vince and Eric try to get Billy in showing them a cut of Medellín. Meanwhile, Drama hosts a party at his apartment for Vince, while Ari uses his influence to find why his son is not getting enrolled at his daughter's private school.

According to Nielsen Media Research, the episode was seen by an estimated 2.27 million household viewers and gained a 1.2/4 ratings share among adults aged 18–49. The episode received generally positive reviews from critics, although some expressed criticism for the episode's pacing.

== Plot ==
After taking vacations in Italy, the boys return to Los Angeles. Vince (Adrian Grenier) decides to have a party to celebrate his return, which will be hosted by Drama (Kevin Dillon) at his apartment. Vince and Eric (Kevin Connolly) meet with Ari (Jeremy Piven), who demands to see a cut of the film. However, Billy is reclusive over his post-production process, and he says they will have to wait another month for the final cut.

Ari and Melissa (Perrey Reeves) are called to Sarah's private school, Briar Country Day School, where their son Jonah just had his exam. They are informed that Jonah is unlikely to get enrolled, especially as he punched another kid. Ari uses his connections to get answers from the school's headmaster, Andrew Preston (Dan Castellaneta). Preston confirms that Jonah is not the problem, but Ari is the reason behind the setback; his vulgar attitude and constant rule violations annoyed the board, and while they will allow Sarah to continue, they will not enroll Jonah as they do not want Ari around for another decade. Angry, Ari decides to get Sarah out of the school.

After Vince and Eric leave the party, Drama and Turtle (Jerry Ferrara) move the party to Vince's hotel room. When Anthony Michael Hall urinates from the balcony, they are kicked out of the hotel. Vince and Eric finally locate Billy, convincing him to show them the cut. After watching it, they claim they love it, although in the drive home, Eric says he disliked it. When he asks Vince if he really loved the cut, Vince hesitates.

== Production ==
=== Development ===
The episode was written by series creator Doug Ellin, and directed by co-producer Mark Mylod. This was Ellin's 29th writing credit, and Mylod's fifth directing credit.

== Reception ==
=== Viewers ===
In its original American broadcast, "The First Cut Is the Deepest" was seen by an estimated 2.27 million household viewers with a 1.2/4 in the 18–49 demographics. This means that 1.2 percent of all households with televisions watched the episode, while 4 percent of all of those watching television at the time of the broadcast watched it. This was a slight increase in viewership from the previous episode, which was watched by an estimated 2.24 million household viewers with a 1.4/4 in the 18–49 demographics.

=== Critical reviews ===
"The First Cut Is the Deepest" received generally positive reviews from critics. Ahsan Haque of IGN gave the episode a "good" 7 out of 10 and wrote, "After the previous episode's phenomenal documentary format triumph, this week's outing represents a return to the classic storytelling style of the show. It's successful, and certainly entertaining, but after the precedent set in the season opener, this episode simply doesn't live up to the high bar that was set last week. Drama's neurotic approach to keeping his house clean, as well as Ari's ordeal with the exclusive private school delivered on both comedy and entertainment, but the main storyline of chasing Billy Walsh around town felt more like a stalling tactic by the writers."

Alan Sepinwall wrote, "Not really wild about the Ari subplot, which reminded me of that episode from earlier this year where his old college buddy came to visit. It was just filler, something for Piven to do early in a season that doesn't seem to have much room for Ari." Adam Sternbergh of Vulture wrote, "The enjoyment level of any given episode of Entourage is inversely proportional to how many scenes involve Turtle and Drama hanging out together. As foils to straight men E and Vince, they're funny and necessary; as fugitives from a buddy comedy strolling the aisles of Costco, they make you stab at your DVR's fast-forward." Trish Wethman of TV Guide wrote, "Frankly, I am ready to move on from this little chapter in Vince's career. Hopefully Medellin will prove to be a huge success, but in the meantime it seems that Vince is going to get the chance to explore the inner life of a broke, unemployed actor. I guess that could be considered Method, right?"

Chris Shonberger of Entertainment Weekly wrote, "After last week's unexpected making of doc, The First Cut Is the Deepest felt like the real season 4 premiere. Granted, any of the last nine episodes would have worked equally well as a season opener, but this one definitely had all the trappings of a classic Entourage premiere." Jonathan Toomey of TV Squad wrote, "This show continues to impress me. After last week's stellar "documentary" episode, we returned to the regular format but still maintained this ridiculously entertaining blend of humor and drama that the show has achieved. It was good to begin with and now it's even better."
