= Adios Amigos (Entourage) =

- Entourage episode
- Episode no.: Season 3 Episode 20
- Directed by: Mark Mylod
- Written by: Doug Ellin
- Cinematography by: Dave Perkal
- Editing by: Gregg Featherman
- Original release date: June 3, 2007
- Running time: 27 minutes

Guest appearances
- Adam Goldberg as Nick Rubenstein (special guest star); Emmanuelle Chriqui as Sloan McQuewick; Rhys Coiro as Billy Walsh; Brian Palermo as Real Estate Agent; Anne De Salvo as Landlady #1; Colleen Camp as Marjorie

Episode chronology
← Previous "The Prince's Bride"	Next → "Welcome to the Jungle"

"Adios Amigos" is the twentieth episode and season finale of the third season of the American comedy-drama television series Entourage. It is the 42nd overall episode of the series and was written by series creator Doug Ellin, and directed by Mark Mylod. It originally aired on HBO on June 3, 2007.

The series chronicles the acting career of Vincent Chase, a young A-list movie star, and his childhood friends from Queens, New York City, as they attempt to further their nascent careers in Los Angeles. In the episode, Vince gets help from Nick Rubenstein in securing funding for Medellín, but requires getting a director. Eric, Drama and Turtle are forced to find new homes as they leave the mansion.

According to Nielsen Media Research, the episode was seen by an estimated 3.36 million household viewers and gained a 1.9/5 ratings share among adults aged 18–49. The episode received positive reviews from critics, who praised the storylines and set-up for the new season.

== Plot ==
As Vince (Adrian Grenier) refused to have sex with Nika, there is still no funding for Medellín. The boys also move out of the mansion, with each one moving to separate houses. However, Ari (Jeremy Piven) reports that Nick Rubenstein (Adam Goldberg) is willing to finance the film, and they prepare a meeting. Needing a director, they consider and visit Billy Walsh (Rhys Coiro), who is now a porn director, but he initially refuses to accept the offer.

While Eric (Kevin Connolly) moves in with Sloan (Emmanuelle Chriqui), Drama (Kevin Dillon) and Turtle (Jerry Ferrara) have to find a new place. Drama wants to rent a loft, but Turtle refuses to live there due to the poor conditions. After reading the script, Billy is delighted due to his interest in Pablo Escobar and accepts to direct the film on a lower budget. However, this also sparks a conflict between Billy and Nick, as Billy has now asked for a bigger budget and final cut privilege.

Confident that Five Towns will grow in audience, Drama decides to pay $1.5 million a luxury apartment, worrying Turtle. While Nick still has reservations, he agrees to fund it, finally getting Medellín out of development hell. During a celebration, Eric decides to drop his plan to move in with Sloan and go to Colombia with Vince. As the boys celebrate, Eric is called by Billy, who states he will film the film in Spanish. While Eric is worried about its prospects, Vince is still determined that it will be a success.

== Production ==
=== Development ===
The episode was written by series creator Doug Ellin, and directed by Mark Mylod. This was Ellin's 27th writing credit, and Mylod's third directing credit.

== Reception ==
=== Viewers ===
In its original American broadcast, "Adios Amigos" was seen by an estimated 3.36 million household viewers with a 1.9/5 in the 18–49 demographics. This means that 1.9 percent of all households with televisions watched the episode, while 5 percent of all of those watching television at the time of the broadcast watched it. This was a slight decrease in viewership from the previous episode, which was watched by an estimated 3.38 million household viewers with a 2.0/5 in the 18–49 demographics.

=== Critical reviews ===
"Adios Amigos" received positive reviews from critics. Ahsan Haque of IGN gave the episode a "great" 8.6 out of 10 and wrote, "Overall, this was a great setup episode that provides a good idea of where things should be heading next season. On its own, a lot happened, but it didn't manage to deliver a completely satisfying single episode experience. However, with so many significant changes put in motion, the next season of Entourage should be very exciting for Vince and friends, especially if the writers give us a chance to experience parts of the filming of Medellin in Colombia. There's often a tendency to skip several months of stories between seasons, and it would really be a shame if we don't get to see how Walsh, Eric and Vince make Medellin happen."

Alan Sepinwall wrote, "The largely underwhelming third season comes to a close on a fairly funny note." Adam Sternbergh of Vulture wrote, "Perhaps this episode felt especially pale when held up against the infinitely more entertaining guy-banter in the just-released Knocked Up. But unless Vince contracts gonorrhea, Drama comes out of the closet, or Walsh has a Coppola-style, Hearts of Darkness meltdown on the set of Medellin, it's hard to imagine how the producers can defibrillate this series back to life in Season Four." Trish Wethman of TV Guide wrote, "As is often the case, the season wrapped up with the boys on top of the world. All the pieces seemed to fall into place for Vincent Chase once again. But Billy's ominous phone call certainly set the tone for the trouble to come. All of a sudden, two weeks seems like a long time to wait."

Paul Katz of Entertainment Weekly wrote, "Sloane looked like she couldn't decide whether to order the chicken or the fish while flying economy. Although E didn't have the talk with Sloane, he made it clear to Vinnie that his priorities lay in Colombia." Jonathan Toomey of TV Squad wrote, "What we got here was essentially a culmination of the series thus far. It's everything that Vince and E have worked so hard for and now it's finally paying off. Walsh is on board too and Medellín is officially a go. So as the season ends in normal Entourage fashion with Vince heading off to make his next pic, who knows what's in store."
