= The Prince's Bride =

- Entourage episode
- Episode no.: Season 3 Episode 19
- Directed by: David Nutter
- Written by: Rob Weiss
- Cinematography by: Rob Sweeney
- Editing by: Jonathan Scott Corn
- Original release date: May 20, 2007
- Running time: 24 minutes

Guest appearances
- Brett Ratner as Himself (special guest star); Lauren London as Kelly; Marlon Young as Rufus; Deborah Lacey as Rufus' Wife; Assaf Cohen as Yair Marx; Branka Katić as Nika Marx; Branden Williams as Himself; Jimmy Shubert as Castmate; Steven Montfort as J.J.; Jonathan Sadowski as Brett's Assistant

Episode chronology
← Previous "The Resurrection"	Next → "Adios Amigos"

"The Prince's Bride" is the nineteenth episode of the third season of the American comedy-drama television series Entourage. It is the 41st overall episode of the series and was written by co-executive producer Rob Weiss, and directed by David Nutter. It originally aired on HBO on May 20, 2007.

The series chronicles the acting career of Vincent Chase, a young A-list movie star, and his childhood friends from Queens, New York City, as they attempt to further their nascent careers in Los Angeles. In the episode, Vince, Eric and Ari meet with a multi-millionaire who could fund Medellín. Meanwhile, Drama gets an opportunity to star in a film by Brett Ratner, and Turtle goes out with Kelly on a date.

According to Nielsen Media Research, the episode was seen by an estimated 3.38 million household viewers and gained a 2.0/5 ratings share among adults aged 18–49. The episode received generally positive reviews from critics, although some criticized the lack of progress in the main storyline.

== Plot ==
Lloyd (Rex Lee) calls Drama (Kevin Dillon) to inform him that Brett Ratner was impressed by his work in Five Towns, and wants him for Rush Hour 3. He arrives at a party at Ratner's house, but is disappointed when it is revealed that he was not the intended guest. Nevertheless, Drama refuses to leave the party, hoping Ratner changes his mind.

Vince (Adrian Grenier), Eric (Kevin Connolly) and Ari (Jeremy Piven) visit Yair Marx (Assaf Cohen), a multi-millionaire playboy from Israel, to have him invest in Medellín. During the meeting, Yair's bride, Nika, takes an interest in Vince, making him uncomfortable. Later, she calls Vince, telling him that he will get funding, but asks to meet him at the Beverly Wilshire Hotel. Turtle (Jerry Ferrara) visits Kelly (Lauren London) for a date, which is interrupted when Rufus (Marlon Young) suddenly arrives. When Rufus falls asleep, they decide to go dining, and Turtle allows Kelly in driving his car.

After so much insistence, Ratner reluctantly allows Drama to appear as an extra in the film, delighting him. Vince and Eric visit Nika, but she is angry that Vince believed they would have and leaves upset. Despite that, Yair calls to tell Vince and Ari that he will fund the $60 million budget and invites them to his house. Yair tells Vince that he is aware of the meeting, disappointed over his decision. However, Vince is surprised when Yair actually refers to turning down Nika, and tells him he will fund the film if he has sex with his wife, who is waiting for him upstairs.

== Production ==
=== Development ===
The episode was written by co-executive producer Rob Weiss, and directed by David Nutter. This was Weiss' 13th writing credit, and Nutter's third directing credit.

== Reception ==
=== Viewers ===
In its original American broadcast, "The Prince's Bride" was seen by an estimated 3.38 million household viewers with a 2.0/5 in the 18–49 demographics. This means that 2 percent of all households with televisions watched the episode, while 5 percent of all of those watching television at the time of the broadcast watched it. This was a 8% decrease in viewership from the previous episode, which was watched by an estimated 3.12 million household viewers with a 1.7/5 in the 18–49 demographics.

=== Critical reviews ===
"The Prince's Bride" received generally positive reviews from critics. Ahsan Haque of IGN gave the episode a "good" 7.7 out of 10 and wrote, "Drama's little outburst to get into Ratner's movie was purely filler material, and after last week's "victory" moment, it felt a little cheap. Drama worked hard to get where he did, and having to whine his way into a movie role immediately after diminishes his previous success. It was nice to see Turtle, Kelly and their budding romance, however."

Adam Sternbergh of Vulture wrote, "the show attempts a twist based on tricking us into thinking it's not relying on a tired old plotline when, in fact, it is. Well played, gentlemen. Well played." Trish Wethman of TV Guide wrote, "After all the network-television season finales wreaked havoc on my emotional state this past week, it was nice to take it down a notch with the guys. I can always count on Entourage for good, mindless entertainment that doesn't shock (too often anyway) and doesn't require much thinking. There's something to be said for reliable mindlessness."

Paul Katz of Entertainment Weekly wrote, "This week was all about Hollywood myths. Girls in Hollywood can't be sexy and sweet. Big-time directors in Hollywood are forever surrounded by beautiful women. Every lady in Hollywood — married or not — wants to bed a movie star. Some are more true than others, but who cares, since Entourage is back in fine form spinning the tales of excess that surround our motley quartet of boys." Jonathan Toomey of TV Squad wrote, "As much as I've enjoyed the recent string of episodes, this one definitely best resembles the Entourage I remember. We had it all. Great story, some classic Johnny moments, and one of the most insane situations Vince has ever gotten himself into. Medellín is a go (finally!), but it certainly didn't come together the way I expected."
