= Less Than 30 =

- Entourage episode
- Episode no.: Season 3 Episode 13
- Directed by: Julian Farino
- Written by: Doug Ellin
- Cinematography by: Rob Sweeney
- Editing by: Gregg Featherman
- Original release date: April 8, 2007
- Running time: 26 minutes

Guest appearances
- Joel Silver as Himself (special guest star); Carla Gugino as Amanda Daniels (special guest star); Emmanuelle Chriqui as Sloan McQuewick; Mike Hagerty as Boat Rental Operator; Smith Cho as Chloe; James Moses Black as Salesman

Episode chronology
← Previous "Sorry, Ari"	Next → "Dog Day Afternoon"

"Less Than 30" is the thirteenth episode of the third season of the American comedy-drama television series Entourage. It is the 35th overall episode of the series and was written by series creator Doug Ellin and directed by co-executive producer Julian Farino. It originally aired on HBO on April 8, 2007.

The series chronicles the acting career of Vincent Chase, a young A-list movie star, and his childhood friends from Queens, New York City, as they attempt to further their nascent careers in Los Angeles. In the episode, Vince has a new agent, although Ari still tries to get him back by reviving one of his passion projects. Meanwhile, Eric and Turtle get into an argument over the expenses for Vince's birthday party, while Drama is annoyed at the lack of attention for his new show.

According to Nielsen Media Research, the episode was seen by an estimated 3.77 million household viewers and gained a 2.0/5 ratings share among adults aged 18–49. The episode received mixed-to-positive reviews from critics, who were frustrated with the lack of progress and character development in the episode.

== Plot ==
On his birthday, Vince (Adrian Grenier) meets with his agent, Amanda (Carla Gugino), to discuss a new potential film project. Unsatisfied with the scripts, Amanda suggests Glimpses of the Moon, a biopic of Edith Wharton directed by Sam Mendes. For his birthday, she invites him and his friends to a Lakers game in the first row, although it proves to be an awkward experience when they notice Ari (Jeremy Piven) across the court. Meanwhile, Drama (Kevin Dillon) is enthusiastic for his new show, Five Towns, which will premiere soon in NBC. However, he is annoyed that people are not interested in the promotional billboard in Sunset Boulevard.

Ari sets up a dinner with Vince and Eric (Kevin Connolly), claiming it will be only as friends. Ari restricts himself from mentioning any business and gets himself invited to Vince's birthday party. However, Eric is angry upon learning that his credit cards are empty after he gave them to Turtle (Jerry Ferrara) to rent a yacht for the party, but Turtle decided to get a bigger boat due to capacity concerns. Ari then sends a gift to Vince; the script for Medellín, which has been put back in development. Amanda is angry with the news, and she confirms that the project will move forward but only with Benicio del Toro.

At the party, Turtle reveals that he got money by having Victoria's Secret sponsor the party. Amanda argues with Ari over Medellín, as Ari claims del Toro is losing interest in the project. Ari reveals that he lied about only wanting to be Vince's friend, but Vince tells him he is staying with Amanda. Later, Amanda tells Vince that an offer is available for Glimpses of the Moon, but she is upset when Vince says he will put that film on hold until he learns if Medellín is available.

== Production ==
=== Development ===
The episode was written by series creator Doug Ellin and directed by co-executive producer Julian Farino. This was Ellin's 22nd writing credit, and Farino's 19th directing credit.

=== Casting ===
In April 2006, it was announced that Carla Gugino and Joel Silver would guest star in the season.

== Reception ==
=== Viewers ===
In its original American broadcast, "Less Than 30" was seen by an estimated 3.77 million household viewers with a 2.0/5 in the 18–49 demographics. This means that 2 percent of all households with televisions watched the episode, while 5 percent of all of those watching television at the time of the broadcast watched it. This was a 48% increase in viewership from the previous episode, which was watched by an estimated 2.54 million household viewers with a 1.5/4 in the 18–49 demographics.

=== Critical reviews ===
"Less Than 30" received mixed-to-positive reviews from critics. Ahsan Haque of IGN gave the episode a "great" 8 out of 10 and wrote, "Overall, this episode manages to serve the purpose of advancing the "life after Ari" storyline forward. On its own, however, there simply wasn't enough to make the show special."

Alan Sepinwall wrote, "Drama had a few funny lines, but not enough to save the non-Ari portion of the show this week." Trish Wethman of TV Guide wrote, "Despite the huge, poorly lit, Sunset Boulevard billboard for his new series, it seems that nobody knows anything about the show. I, for one, am hoping that Drama's career takes off like gangbusters. The only thing that has the potential to be funnier than watching Johnny Drama, struggling actor, is imagining his reaction to even a modicum of success."

Michael Endelman of Entertainment Weekly wrote, "Although Vince has moved on, Ari still hasn't forgotten about the one that got away. The aftershocks of being fired still haunt Ari, and we got some classic Piven anxiety and freak-outs in his office. The Ari-Vince relationship was played out very cleverly, with scenes that riffed on male-female courtship rituals, complete with talk of exes, an awkward meeting in a restaurant, painful small talk, and nervous phone calls." Jonathan Toomey of TV Squad wrote, "Entourage has gone ahead and blown away all my expectations. This show feels new again. The way it did when it first premiered. Suddenly, there's this extremely serious tone and to top it off? It's just as funny as it ever was."
