= The Dream Team (Entourage) =

- Entourage episode
- Episode no.: Season 4 Episode 5
- Directed by: Seith Mann
- Written by: Brian Burns
- Cinematography by: Rob Sweeney
- Editing by: Gregg Featherman
- Original release date: July 15, 2007
- Running time: 26 minutes

Guest appearances
- Bob Balaban as Doctor (special guest star); Snoop Dogg as Himself (special guest star); Constance Zimmer as Dana Gordon; Joshua LeBar as Josh Weinstein; Steven Montford as J.J.; Elvis Mitchell as Himself; Branden Williams as Himself; Cole Williams as Castmate #1; Ryan Eggold as Castmate #2

Episode chronology
← Previous "Sorry, Harvey"	Next → "The WeHo Ho"

"The Dream Team" is the fifth episode of the fourth season of the American comedy-drama television series Entourage. It is the 47th overall episode of the series and was written by supervising producer Brian Burns, and directed by Seith Mann. It originally aired on HBO on July 15, 2007.

The series chronicles the acting career of Vincent "Vince" Chase, a young A-list movie star, and his childhood friends from Queens, New York City, the titular entourage, as they attempt to further their nascent careers in Los Angeles. In the episode, conflict arises between Eric and Billy when the Medellín trailer is leaked, while Drama tries to look younger. Meanwhile, Ari competes with Dana Gordon in taking Heath Ledger out of a project.

According to Nielsen Media Research, the episode was seen by an estimated 2.63 million household viewers and gained a 1.6/5 ratings share among adults aged 18–49. The episode received generally positive reviews from critics, who viewed it as more focused than previous episodes. For the episode, Kevin Dillon received a nomination for Outstanding Supporting Actor in a Comedy Series at the 60th Primetime Emmy Awards.

== Plot ==
While hanging out with Snoop Dogg, Vince (Adrian Grenier) and Eric (Kevin Connolly) discover that the Medellín trailer has been leaked to YouTube. Billy (Rhys Coiro) is angry, and accuses Eric of leaking it, as he had the only other copies of the trailer.

Wanting to look younger, Drama (Kevin Dillon) is fascinated by a cap that displays the words "California Homegrown". As the cap can only be acquired by joining a medical-marijuana facility, he fakes his condition to get a prescription from a doctor. After buying the cap, he returns confidently to the Five Towns set, where his cast members are not won over by the cap. However, Drama regains his confidence when smoking marijuana with Turtle (Jerry Ferrara) at his trailer. Ari (Jeremy Piven) discovers that Dana Gordon (Constance Zimmer) has now become his rival, and sets out to take Heath Ledger out from a project. He and Lloyd (Rex Lee)) meet with Ledger's agent, Josh Weinstein (Joshua LeBar), successfully convincing him to get Ledger out, and he offers Vince as his replacement.

Vince meets with Elvis Mitchell, a The New York Times reporter, making a profile on Medellín. The meeting goes well, until Billy shows up and starts arguing with Eric over dinner. Despite that, Elvis considers them a very efficient trio and leaves satisfied that they got along well. Vince leaves with Eric before the latter gets into a fight with Billy, with Eric declaring that he is done with Billy after the premiere in Cannes. They are called by Ari, who has given them a new project with Eric as producer. However, they want the Medellín crew back, which means having to work with Billy again.

== Production ==
=== Development ===
The episode was written by supervising producer Brian Burns, and directed by Seith Mann. This was Burns' seventh writing credit, and Mann's first directing credit.

== Reception ==
=== Viewers ===
In its original American broadcast, "The Dream Team" was seen by an estimated 2.63 million household viewers with a 1.6/5 in the 18–49 demographics. This means that 1.6 percent of all households with televisions watched the episode, while 5 percent of all of those watching television at the time of the broadcast watched it. This was a 19% increase in viewership from the previous episode, which was watched by an estimated 2.21 million household viewers with a 1.3/4 in the 18–49 demographics.

=== Critical reviews ===
"The Dream Team" received generally positive reviews from critics. Ahsan Haque of IGN gave the episode a "great" 8 out of 10 and wrote, "While it didn't feature anything unique in terms of concept or story, 'The Dream Team' was extremely engaging from start to finish, and ultimately proves to be a highly satisfying episode of Entourage."

Adam Sternbergh of Vulture wrote, "The most pleasurable moment in this episode? Billy Walsh gets a huge Medellin tattoo across his back. A funny visual gag, even though it underscores the fact that every character on this show is only allowed two personality traits (Billy: obsessive, insane)." Trish Wethman of TV Guide wrote, "I thought for sure the dinner was going to go south. Thankfully for Vince and the good of the movie, the two held off from killing each other. I can't wait to see what happens when Ari starts negotiating with Walsh. That should be something to see."

Dawnie Walton of Entertainment Weekly wrote, "What did I find amazing about tonight's episode? Not that at long last E and Wally Balls finally threw down. Not that Drama looked ridiculous wearing a trucker hat — hell, the majority of Los Angelenos wouldn't know a big rig from Optimus Prime. Nope. It was the trailer for Medellín that played at the end of the episode." Jonathan Toomey of TV Squad wrote, "I think Entourage is finally returning to the level of quality we had been used to. Granted I've been enjoying this season right along, but this episode was spectacular from all accounts. It just flowed very smoothly, had some classic Ari and Drama lines, had E get in a fight, and even guest-starred the very funny Bob Balaban. Sounds like a winner to me."

Kevin Dillon submitted this episode to support his nomination for Outstanding Supporting Actor in a Comedy Series at the 60th Primetime Emmy Awards.
