= Welcome to the Jungle (Entourage) =

- Entourage episode
- Episode no.: Season 4 Episode 1
- Directed by: Mark Mylod
- Written by: Doug Ellin
- Cinematography by: Rob Sweeney
- Editing by: Gregg Featherman
- Original release date: June 17, 2007
- Running time: 30 minutes

Guest appearances
- Stephen Gaghan as Himself (special guest star); Adam Goldberg as Nick Rubenstein (special guest star); Sofía Vergara as Village Girl

Episode chronology
← Previous "Adios Amigos"	Next → "The First Cut Is the Deepest"

"Welcome to the Jungle" is the first episode of the fourth season of the American comedy-drama television series Entourage. It is the 43rd overall episode of the series and was written by series creator Doug Ellin, and directed by co-producer Mark Mylod. It originally aired on HBO on June 17, 2007.

The series chronicles the acting career of Vincent Chase, a young A-list movie star, and his childhood friends from Queens, New York City, as they attempt to further their nascent careers in Los Angeles. In the episode, a crew details the behind-the-scenes documentary about the filming of Medellin in Colombia.

According to Nielsen Media Research, the episode was seen by an estimated 2.24 million household viewers and gained a 1.4/4 ratings share among adults aged 18–49. The episode received critical acclaim, with praise towards the episode's format, humor and performances, with many naming it among the series' best episodes.

== Plot ==
The episode is presented as a behind-the-scenes documentary about the filming of Medellin. In September 2006, Billy (Rhys Coiro) and the boys arrive in Bogotá, Colombia to start filming. Eric (Kevin Connolly) serves as producer, despite his lack of experience. Billy becomes annoyed over cellphones ringing on set, and even demands to rewrite the ending as he dislikes it.

Filming starts eight weeks later, where Billy becomes aggressive with his demands. While the boys love an early cut of the film, Billy hates it, comparing it to a Hallmark film. He attacks the cinematographer, fires him and decides to replace him. Filming is in turmoil as Billy falls in love with a woman (Sofía Vergara) as an extra, but is disappointed when she only sees him as a friend, believing that she is sleeping with someone else. He starts ignoring Vince (Adrian Grenier), who claims he is not sleeping with her. Eric is also frustrated that there's still no ending, especially with the current script pages running out in a few days. Billy demands to hire Stephen Gaghan to write the ending, despite the lack of additional funding. Vince asks Ari (Jeremy Piven) to get more money from Nick Rubenstein (Adam Goldberg), but Nick had his bank accounts frozen when he was arrested with cocaine in his car on his way to Colombia.

Fed up with the delays, Eric confronts Billy over his behavior, but realizes that the scale of the production affected him, as he only made independent films. Eric decides to hire Gaghan, but this prompts Billy to rewrite the script through the night. While they lose money on Gaghan, the boys love the new script. After shooting a climatic action sequence, in which Drama (Kevin Dillon) makes a cameo, filming officially wraps on Medellín. When asked by the documentary crew over his thoughts on the film, Billy states that he won't know if the film is any good until he sees the final cut.

== Production ==
=== Development ===
The episode was written by series creator Doug Ellin, and directed by co-producer Mark Mylod. This was Ellin's 28th writing credit, and Mylod's fourth directing credit.

== Reception ==
=== Viewers ===
In its original American broadcast, "Welcome to the Jungle" was seen by an estimated 2.24 million household viewers with a 1.4/4 in the 18–49 demographics. This means that 1.4 percent of all households with televisions watched the episode, while 4 percent of all of those watching television at the time of the broadcast watched it. This was a 34% decrease in viewership from the previous episode, which was watched by an estimated 3.36 million household viewers with a 1.9/5 in the 18–49 demographics.

=== Critical reviews ===
"Welcome to the Jungle" received critical acclaim. Ahsan Haque of IGN gave the episode a "masterpiece" 10 out of 10 and wrote, "This episode effectively comes across as a high quality documentary of the type that you'd normally see on a collector's edition DVD. All that's missing is the actual movie, and after watching this, you can't help but want to see a real Medellin get made. At the very least, you'd have to admit that "Welcome to the Jungle" is one of the most memorable episodes of Entourage of the entire series and a brilliant way to kick-off the fourth season."

Alan Sepinwall wrote, "All in all, not a bad start to season four, though I wish Ari could have been involved more somehow (maybe as part of the machinations to get Gaghan)." Adam Sternbergh of Vulture wrote, "Entourage could benefit from an extended stay in the jungle. For now, though, the premiere provided a very satisfying twist — and a promising start to season four." Trish Wethman of TV Guide wrote, "As far as the buzzed-about documentary-style episode, I found it a little jarring to frame the story that way and I didn’t necessarily think it added much to the episode."

Paul Katz of Entertainment Weekly wrote, "Phew. That's all I can say after this episode. It's not so much that the official start of season 4 was a brilliant and creative way to get a behind-the-scenes look at the filming of Medellín." Jonathan Toomey of TV Squad wrote, "What we got though was something special, unlike anything Entourage has tackled in its previous 42 episodes. A documentary look at the making of Vincent Chase's latest feature. A blend of the humor we've come to expect from this show was merged with a heavy dose of reality and drama - what goes into making a film under the harshest of conditions. It's a layer of the show that we haven't seen before and I hope that it can continue when the normal format returns next week."

Rhys Coiro submitted this episode for consideration for Outstanding Supporting Actor in a Comedy Series, while Mark Mylod submitted it for Outstanding Directing for a Comedy Series, and Doug Ellin submitted it for Outstanding Writing in a Comedy Series at the 60th Primetime Emmy Awards.
