= The WeHo Ho =

- Entourage episode
- Episode no.: Season 4 Episode 6
- Directed by: Mark Mylod
- Written by: Doug Ellin
- Cinematography by: Anthony Hardwick
- Editing by: David Rogers
- Original release date: July 22, 2007
- Running time: 26 minutes

Guest appearances
- Constance Zimmer as Dana Gordon; Louis Lombardi as Ronnie; Chris Blasman as Glenn Holden; Brandon Quinn as Tom

Episode chronology
← Previous "The Dream Team"	Next → "The Day Fuckers"

"The WeHo Ho" is the sixth episode of the fourth season of the American comedy-drama television series Entourage. It is the 48th overall episode of the series and was written by series creator Doug Ellin, and directed by co-producer Mark Mylod. It originally aired on HBO on July 22, 2007.

The series chronicles the acting career of Vincent Chase, a young A-list movie star, and his childhood friends from Queens, New York City, as they attempt to further their nascent careers in Los Angeles. In the episode, Vince's new project is jeopardized due to the conflicts by Eric and Billy. Meanwhile, Drama joins Turtle in a scheme with his cousin, while Ari tries to rekindle Lloyd's relationship with his boyfriend.

According to Nielsen Media Research, the episode was seen by an estimated 2.51 million household viewers and gained a 1.5/4 ratings share among adults aged 18–49. The episode received mixed reviews from critics, with some criticizing the subplots, although Ari's and Lloyd's subplot received praise.

== Plot ==
Eric (Kevin Connolly) tells Ari (Jeremy Piven) that he won't work again with Billy (Rhys Coiro), jeopardizing the new project as they are all required to be part of it. Ari makes Billy apologize to Eric for his actions, although he is still not convinced.

Lloyd (Rex Lee) starts mishandling his duties at the agency, as his boyfriend Tom (Brandon Quinn) just broke up with him as he was only focused on the agency. Eventually, Lloyd quits his job and his replacement does not live up to his standards. He visits Lloyd to get him back, but he says he will only return if Tom rekindles their relationship. Ari visits Tom at the store he works at, where Tom says he was certain that Lloyd cheated on him. Ari provides an alibi for Lloyd, despite knowing he committed the act. With their relationship back, Lloyd returns to work immediately. Drama (Kevin Dillon) reluctantly accompanies Turtle (Jerry Ferrara) to Palmdale to visit his cousin, Ronnie (Louis Lombardi). They want to get involved in an investment with Ronnie, wherein they will buy Sandy Koufax's jersey shirt, which will have an immense value after his death. Ronnie pulls out of the bidding, so Drama buys the jersey for $62,000, although he learns that Koufax is still in healthy condition.

Dana (Constance Zimmer) gives Vince (Adrian Grenier), Eric and Billy new updates on the project, Lost in the Clouds. Billy is determined to write the project, which will start filming in 12 weeks. As he maintains his personality through the visit, Eric tells Vince that he will not work with him. Vince informs Ari he is passing on the project, angering him. Eric is willing to return as Vince's agent while keeping his producer's fee. Vince eventually accepts to star in the project, delighting Ari.

== Production ==
=== Development ===
The episode was written by series creator Doug Ellin, and directed by co-producer Mark Mylod. This was Ellin's 31st writing credit, and Mylod's sixth directing credit.

== Reception ==
=== Viewers ===
In its original American broadcast, "The WeHo Ho" was seen by an estimated 2.51 million household viewers with a 1.5/4 in the 18–49 demographics. This means that 1.5 percent of all households with televisions watched the episode, while 4 percent of all of those watching television at the time of the broadcast watched it. This was a slight decrease in viewership from the previous episode, which was watched by an estimated 2.63 million household viewers with a 1.6/5 in the 18–49 demographics.

=== Critical reviews ===
"The WeHo Ho" received mixed reviews from critics. Ahsan Haque of IGN gave the episode a "good" 7.9 out of 10 and wrote, "Overall, this episode manages to standout because of the Ari and Lloyd moments. Those two share an incredible chemistry and this is definitely one of the highlights of their unique relationship. On the merits of those scenes alone, this episode is a definite must-watch. It's just too bad that the other arcs in this episode fail to live up to the multi-Emmy nominee worthy standards we've come to expect on Entourage. Johnny and Turtle just weren't all that funny in this outing and we got nothing new out of the ongoing "Medellin" arc."

Adam Sternbergh of Vulture wrote, "This week's episode of Entourage, “The Weho Ho”, was, yet again, a treat for fans of misdirectional meta-narrative post-dramaticism – our sunny-side-of-life term for the show's tendency to watch blithely as opportunities for conflict and intrigue float past like so many smokin' babes on a Los Angeles sidewalk." Trish Wethman of TV Guide wrote, "So far for me, this season has been disappointing. In the first few years, I remember frequently laughing out loud during episodes and enjoying the fresh take on the life of a Hollywood up-and-comer. These days, the show seems to be so mired in the details of the deal-making that we are getting away from all the fun."

Paul Katz of Entertainment Weekly wrote, "Lloyd's breakup gave Rex Lee some nice moments to flex his comedy chops, and once again Ari proved he's a romantic at heart." Jonathan Toomey of TV Squad wrote, "There was so much going on and none of it really tied together. All the good episodes of Entourage have A and B plots that usually collide at the end. None of that here. What did I like? More Lloyd. What didn't I like? Everything else."

Rex Lee submitted this episode for consideration for Outstanding Supporting Actor in a Comedy Series at the 60th Primetime Emmy Awards.
