= Sorry, Harvey =

- Entourage episode
- Episode no.: Season 4 Episode 4
- Directed by: Ken Whittingham
- Written by: Doug Ellin
- Cinematography by: Anthony Hardwick
- Editing by: John Murray
- Original release date: July 8, 2007
- Running time: 26 minutes

Guest appearances
- M. Night Shyamalan as Himself (special guest star); Maury Chaykin as Harvey Weingard (special guest star); Stephen Tobolowsky as Nel Lourie; Connie Ray as Oxnard Wife; Heidi Marnhout as Joyce; Gregory Vahanian as Valet

Episode chronology
← Previous "Malibooty"	Next → "The Dream Team"

"Sorry, Harvey" is the fourth episode of the fourth season of the American comedy-drama television series Entourage. It is the 46th overall episode of the series and was written by series creator Doug Ellin, and directed by Ken Whittingham. It originally aired on HBO on July 8, 2007.

The series chronicles the acting career of Vincent Chase, a young A-list movie star, and his childhood friends from Queens, New York City, as they attempt to further their nascent careers in Los Angeles. In the episode, Eric tries to inform Harvey about their decision to keep Medellín, while Vince has a night out with the Mayor of Beverly Hills. Ari loses a script from M. Night Shyamalan, and must retrieve it for the following day.

According to Nielsen Media Research, the episode was seen by an estimated 2.21 million household viewers and gained a 1.3/4 ratings share among adults aged 18–49. The episode received mixed reviews from critics, who criticized the disjointed storylines.

== Plot ==
Eric (Kevin Connolly) must meet with Harvey (Maury Chaykin) to inform him of their decision to hold back on acquiring Medellín. Drama (Kevin Dillon) asks Vince (Adrian Grenier) to use his star power to influence Nel Lourie (Stephen Tobolowsky), the mayor of Beverly Hills, to annex his apartment into Beverly Hills. Lourie is delighted to spend the day with Vince and his friends.

Ari (Jeremy Piven) receives a script by M. Night Shyamalan, promising to read the 200-page script for the following day. This conflicts with a dinner with Melissa (Perrey Reeves) and her friend, so Ari rushes the dinner to get back home earlier to start reading the script. However, Ari realizes that his car was mistaken for another; the left the script in the other car, and the new car includes sex toys. Using GPS, he returns to the owner's house in Oxnard. The owner's wife was unaware of his visit to the restaurant, but Ari leaves in his car after finding the script intact. On his way back, he is stopped by a police cruiser for a speeding ticket and spends the night in jail, where he starts reading the script. However, Shyamalan says he disliked the ending and makes him read a new ending he wrote.

Eric meets with Harvey at a restaurant, and while Harvey says he wants to slow down his stress, he warns that he doesn't like people who break his trust. Seeing that Vince is at a club, Harvey forces Eric to accompany him there. Lourie bonds with a person at the party, although the boys discover the person to be a transvestite. While surprised, Lourie does not care, confident that they shared a great evening. Harvey gets into a heated argument with a waiter, and he is taken out by security guards. Drama seizes the opportunity to say they won't sell the film to him, causing Vince to state that he will make sure to destroy his career, unclear if it refers to Eric or Drama. The following day, the boys find that TMZ has leaked a video of Lourie's encounter outside the club.

== Production ==
=== Development ===
The episode was written by series creator Doug Ellin, and directed by Ken Whittingham. This was Ellin's 30th writing credit, and Whittingham's fourth directing credit.

== Reception ==
=== Viewers ===
In its original American broadcast, "Sorry, Harvey" was seen by an estimated 2.21 million household viewers with a 1.3/4 in the 18–49 demographics. This means that 1.3 percent of all households with televisions watched the episode, while 4 percent of all of those watching television at the time of the broadcast watched it. This was a 14% decrease in viewership from the previous episode, which was watched by an estimated 2.55 million household viewers with a 1.6/5 in the 18–49 demographics.

=== Critical reviews ===
"Sorry, Harvey" received mixed reviews from critics. Ahsan Haque of IGN gave the episode an "okay" 6.9 out of 10 and wrote, "The entire episode felt a little disjointed and quickly put-together. While it's certainly watchable, "Sorry, Harvey" just doesn't have enough going for it to rank highly against the vast majority of Entourage episodes."

Alan Sepinwall wrote, "Last night's episode wasn't as excruciating as the Lisa Rinna horror show from a week ago, in that it had some (minimal) Ari/Lloyd interaction, M. Night Shyamalan doing one of the better self-parodying cameos and Maury Chaykin taking his scenery-chewing Harvey Weinstein tribute to the next level. But the stories involving the four main characters are now so toothless and predictable that I don't care about anything that happens to them."

Adam Sternbergh of Vulture wrote, "Otherwise, the episode was refreshingly on point. The show's co-creator, Doug Ellin, took the writing credit on the episode, and we hope he'll take a firm hand on the rest of the season, given how much better this week was than the last few painful outings." Trish Wethman of TV Guide wrote, "Tonight's episode definitely helped to renew my faith a little. I've said before that I feel like the wheels have come off the cart with these recent episodes, but tonight was definitely a step in the right direction. Actually, two of my requests from last week were addressed — less Billy Walsh and more Ari — so I can't complain too much."

Dawnie Walton of Entertainment Weekly wrote, "Still, you have to appreciate a story line that ends with full frontal of a tranny and brings all the boys together for the finale. The more the gang is together, the stronger the show gets." Jonathan Toomey of TV Squad wrote, "I think the thing I loved about this episode is the way it mirrored Entourage installments of old as all the stories seemed to flow together. Save for Ari's little diversion with M. Night Shyamalan, this half-hour was wrapped up pretty tightly with plenty of laughs."

Maury Chaykin submitted this episode for consideration for Outstanding Guest Actor in a Comedy Series at the 60th Primetime Emmy Awards.
