= Return of the King (Entourage) =

- Entourage episode
- Episode no.: Season 3 Episode 17
- Directed by: Dan Attias
- Written by: Brian Burns
- Cinematography by: Dave Perkal
- Editing by: Jonathan Scott Corn
- Original release date: May 6, 2007
- Running time: 28 minutes

Guest appearances
- Harris Yulin as Arthur Gatoff (special guest star); Caroline Aaron as Sheila Rubenstein (special guest star); Shelley Berman as Uncle Shelley (special guest star); Edward Burns as Himself (special guest star); Adam Goldberg as Nick Rubenstein (special guest star); Carla Gugino as Amanda Daniels (special guest star); Cassidy Lehrman as Sarah Gold; Emma Prescott as Edward Burns' Daughter

Episode chronology
| ← Previous "Gotcha" | Next → "The Resurrection" |

"Return of the King" is the seventeenth episode of the third season of the American comedy-drama television series Entourage. It is the 39th overall episode of the series and was written by producer Brian Burns, and directed by Dan Attias. It originally aired on HBO on May 6, 2007.

The series chronicles the acting career of Vincent Chase, a young A-list movie star, and his childhood friends from Queens, New York City, as they attempt to further their nascent careers in Los Angeles. In the episode, Vince has an opportunity in finally being part of Medellín, which is complicated due to Ari's actions in convincing the studio head in giving him the greenlight.

According to Nielsen Media Research, the episode was seen by an estimated 3.45 million household viewers and gained a 2.0/5 ratings share among adults aged 18–49. The episode received critical acclaim, with critics praising the humor and progress in the Medellín storyline.

== Plot ==
The boys go to a horse track to stop thinking about work. Drama (Kevin Dillon) decides to bet $100 on a horse, King, when the horse has very low chances of winning. The horse starts surprising and appears to lead, until it loses at the last second, frustrating Drama. When they find that the horse will be killed, Drama decides to purchase it.

Ari (Jeremy Piven) goes to temple with his family for Yom Kippur, where he runs into producer Nick Rubenstein (Adam Goldberg). Nicky is annoyed as Benicio del Toro has left Medellín, and the film might be cancelled soon if he can't find a star on that same day. He contacts Vince (Adrian Grenier) about the offer, and even gets his desired $6 million salary for the film. However, the studio head, Arthur Gatoff, is not convinced of Vince and refuses to allow the project to move forward. The boys start suspecting that Amanda (Carla Gugino) might be holding the deal back.

Drama struggles in keeping the horse, especially when he escapes and he is forced to pay $5,000 to the police for not having permission. Eventually, he decides to give the horse to his Five Towns star Edward Burns, who reluctantly accepts it as a birthday gift for his daughter. Vince and Eric (Kevin Connolly) visit Ari to confirm Vince's commitment to Medellín, but they are informed by Nick that Gatoff has cancelled the project. Vince confronts Amanda, believing she sabotaged the project. Amanda says that it was Nick's fault for disturbing Gatoff, and also reveals that Gatoff confirmed it with her, also wanting to work with Vince in other projects. Amanda then leaves Vince alone, ending their relationship.

== Production ==
=== Development ===
The episode was written by producer Brian Burns, and directed by Dan Attias. This was Burns' sixth writing credit, and Attias' seventh directing credit.

== Reception ==
=== Viewers ===
In its original American broadcast, "Return of the King" was seen by an estimated 3.45 million household viewers with a 2.0/5 in the 18–49 demographics. This means that 2 percent of all households with televisions watched the episode, while 5 percent of all of those watching television at the time of the broadcast watched it. This was a 3% increase in viewership from the previous episode, which was watched by an estimated 3.33 million household viewers with a 1.9/5 in the 18–49 demographics.

=== Critical reviews ===
"Return of the King" received critical acclaim. Ahsan Haque of IGN gave the episode a "great" 8.7 out of 10 and wrote, "With the path cleared for Ari to finally get back together with Vince, this episode definitely did a good job in moving the overall storyline forward. It's as good a way as any to get the crew back together, but it did feel a little abrupt in the end. It would have been nice to see Lloyd again, as he hasn't been seen in the last two episodes. Hopefully he'll make an appearance in the next episode."

Alan Sepinwall wrote, "Of the five episodes HBO sent out for review, this was by far the highlight, because it does what Entourage does best: put Ari in a situation where he has to make a deal under impossible circumstances." Adam Sternbergh of Vulture wrote, "the promising Yom Kippur, no-work-on-the-holiday plotline is completely undermined by an illogical plot point so glaring that we have to wonder if we slept through some important information during the first two minutes of the show." Trish Wethman of TV Guide wrote, "I found the story line with Johnny and the horse to be totally absurd. Someone commented last week that he is starting to come across like a bad sitcom character, and this week I have to agree with that assessment."

Paul Katz of Entertainment Weekly wrote, "Oy, what an episode. If last week's lack of forward plot motion felt like airy, sweet filler then the delightfully sly resolution in Return of the King went down like a cold beer on a hot day: It quenched a long-lasting thirst." Jonathan Toomey of TV Squad wrote, "What a lousy way to utilize a great character and Turtle had to get folded into the mess too. I still think there's loads of untapped comedy gold in seeing Drama working on the set of Five Towns."

Adam Goldberg submitted this episode for consideration for Outstanding Guest Actor in a Comedy Series at the 59th Primetime Emmy Awards.
