= The Resurrection (Entourage) =

- Entourage episode
- Episode no.: Season 3 Episode 18
- Directed by: David Nutter
- Written by: Doug Ellin; Ally Musika
- Cinematography by: Rob Sweeney
- Editing by: Gregg Featherman
- Original release date: May 13, 2007
- Running time: 30 minutes

Guest appearances
- Michael Lerner as Joe Roberts (special guest star); Michael Hitchcock as Paul Schneider (special guest star); Smith Cho as Chloe; Lauren London as Kelly; Elaine Kao as Maxie; Marlon Young as Rufus

Episode chronology
| ← Previous "Return of the King" | Next → "The Prince's Bride" |

"The Resurrection" is the eighteenth episode of the third season of the American comedy-drama television series Entourage. It is the 40th overall episode of the series and was written by series creator Doug Ellin and Ally Musika, and directed by David Nutter. It originally aired on HBO on May 13, 2007.

The series chronicles the acting career of Vincent Chase, a young A-list movie star, and his childhood friends from Queens, New York City, as they attempt to further their nascent careers in Los Angeles. In the episode, Drama faces pressure on the day of the premiere of Five Towns, while Vince and Eric deal with a producer over the Medellín script.

According to Nielsen Media Research, the episode was seen by an estimated 3.12 million household viewers and gained a 1.7/5 ratings share among adults aged 18–49. The episode received critical acclaim, with Kevin Dillon receiving acclaim for his performance. For the episode, Kevin Dillon received a nomination for Outstanding Supporting Actor in a Comedy Series at the 59th Primetime Emmy Awards.

== Plot ==
Five Towns is about to premiere, but Drama (Kevin Dillon) is distracted over its prospects, and refuses to read reviews about the show. To take his mind off, he decides to go to a spa for a happy ending massage. However, he gives in and reads a review in Variety, which is negative. He confronts the writer, Paul Schneider (Michael Hitchcock), who states that similar critics panned the series and that Drama may not be suitable to become an actor.

Vince (Adrian Grenier) and Eric (Kevin Connolly) visit Ari (Jeremy Piven) to discuss Medellín, although Ari reiterates the project is dead. However, he arranges a meeting with producer Joe Roberts (Michael Lerner), who agrees to buy Medellín, but only if Vince stars in another film, Matterhorn. Ari fails to persuade Vince in accepting, and is shocked when Vince and Eric decide to use all their resources to buy the Medellín script themselves. Turtle (Jerry Ferrara) takes Drama's Lincoln Continental in for repairs, and flirts with the owner's daughter, Kelly (Lauren London). He convinces the owner, Rufus (Marlon Young), that he is trustworthy and asks Kelly out on a date.

After reading more negative reviews, Drama decides to take the Lincoln Continental and drive off, while the boys stay to watch the premiere of Five Towns. After the premiere, Joe calls Vince, warning him that he should be careful about the process, agreeing to sell it for $5 million. Ari is re-hired as Vince's agent, and they begin working on the development. By the following morning, Drama stays at the Grand Canyon, thinking about his next move. He is called by the boys, who inform him that the premiere was watched by 16 million viewers and was the night's most watched event, shocking him. A relieved Drama falls to his knees, and proclaims "victory!" as he stares at the Grand Canyon.

== Production ==
=== Development ===
The episode was written by series creator Doug Ellin and associate producer Ally Musika, and directed by David Nutter. This was Ellin's 26th writing credit, Musika's first writing credit, and Nutter's second directing credit.

== Reception ==
=== Viewers ===
In its original American broadcast, "The Resurrection" was seen by an estimated 3.12 million household viewers with a 1.7/5 in the 18–49 demographics. This means that 1.7 percent of all households with televisions watched the episode, while 5 percent of all of those watching television at the time of the broadcast watched it. This was a 10% decrease in viewership from the previous episode, which was watched by an estimated 3.45 million household viewers with a 2.0/5 in the 18–49 demographics.

=== Critical reviews ===
"The Resurrection" received critical acclaim. Ahsan Haque of IGN gave the episode an "amazing" 9.6 out of 10 and wrote, "With so many major developments and a couple of character defining moments, this episode easily stands out as one of the best episodes of the season, if not the series. There are some very significant story changes in the works, and the success of Drama's new TV show should be satisfying for even the most jaded of fans. This is Entourage at its finest."

Adam Sternbergh of Vulture wrote, "Is it fair to complain for weeks that the show's lost its way and then, once it returns to fundamentals, complain that we've seen it all before? No matter! We press on! As this week's episode taught us, critics are a bunch of sniveling weenies anyway." Trish Wethman of TV Guide wrote, "Way to go, Johnny Drama. You have outwitted the universe. Who cares what the critics of the world say? Sixteen million viewers can’t be wrong. Now we get to sit back and experience the impact of success on our favorite den mother. Here’s hoping that Johnny is just as neurotic when his life is on an upswing."

Paul Katz of Entertainment Weekly wrote, "The studio needed to recoup the wasted moola spent on the Paul Haggis production. And the old saying about good scripts being hard to come by is true. So the boys got their script, and Ari got back his clients. What remains? Finding the cash to make the movie. Which leads us into next week." Jonathan Toomey of TV Squad wrote, "One of the things that's impressed me about this second half of Entourage's third season, is the way the show has grown. It's evolved into something much more than just a comedy program full of fart and boob jokes. Even the episodes that aren't loaded with the funny can still be excellent and this installment was no exception."

Kevin Dillon submitted this episode to support his nomination for Outstanding Supporting Actor in a Comedy Series at the 59th Primetime Emmy Awards.
