= Dog Day Afternoon (Entourage) =

- Entourage episode
- Episode no.: Season 3 Episode 14
- Directed by: Mark Mylod
- Written by: Doug Ellin; Rob Weiss
- Cinematography by: Dave Perkal
- Editing by: Gregg Featherman
- Original release date: April 15, 2007
- Running time: 28 minutes

Guest appearances
- Carla Gugino as Amanda Daniels (special guest star); Emmanuelle Chriqui as Sloan McQuewick; Will Sasso as Jay Lester; Busy Philipps as Cheryl; Brianne Davis as Allyson; Cameron Richardson as Lindsay; Jim Holmes as David

Episode chronology
← Previous "Less Than 30"	Next → "Manic Monday"

"Dog Day Afternoon" is the fourteenth episode of the third season of the American comedy-drama television series Entourage. It is the 36th overall episode of the series and was written by series creator Doug Ellin and executive producer Rob Weiss, and directed by Mark Mylod. It originally aired on HBO on April 15, 2007.

The series chronicles the acting career of Vincent Chase, a young A-list movie star, and his childhood friends from Queens, New York City, as they attempt to further their nascent careers in Los Angeles. In the episode, Eric and Sloan plan a romantic weekend, although Vince is accompanying them. Meanwhile, Ari gets Lloyd to do whatever it takes to sign a top TV writer, while Drama and Turtle use their dog to pick up girls.

According to Nielsen Media Research, the episode was seen by an estimated 3.85 million household viewers and gained a 2.3/6 ratings share among adults aged 18–49. The episode received positive reviews from critics; while the scenes featuring Ari and Lloyd were praised, the rest of the subplots received a more mixed response.

== Plot ==
Although Amanda (Carla Gugino) is pressuring him in accepting the role in Glimpses of the Moon, Vince (Adrian Grenier) decides to leave with Eric (Kevin Connolly) and Sloan (Emmanuelle Chriqui) on a road trip to Napa Valley AVA, with Vince taking in a date as part of a double date. Unbeknownst to Vince, Eric and Sloan want to go solo, but Eric is unable to tell Vince.

Ari (Jeremy Piven) gets Lloyd (Rex Lee) to sign Jay Lester (Will Sasso), a top TV writer, as a client. Jay takes an interest in Lloyd, and is impressed by his personality. He later calls Ari to tell him that he is signing with them, but wants Lloyd to visit him with the papers. Lloyd is scared over the implications of the meeting, but Ari convinces him in taking one for the team. Turtle (Jerry Ferrara) and Drama (Kevin Dillon) decide to take their dog, Arnold, to a park in an attempt to pick up girls. They impress two girls, taking them to the house. However, the evening is ruined when their dogs fight. They are forced to accompany the girls to the vet, and stay with them to comfort them, although Turtle is annoyed that they talk badly about Arnold.

Although he tries to get Vince to pull out of their plans, Eric and Sloan still dine with Vince with her date, Lindsay (Cameron Richardson). While Vince believes Sloan and Lindsay are getting along, Eric knows she is uncomfortable. After Lindsay makes a poor comment, Eric finally tells Vince that he and Sloan want to be the only ones on the trip, which Vince understands. Lloyd arrives at Jay's mansion, where he is hosting a party. Feeling guilty, Ari decides to crash the party and retrieve Lloyd, although this costs him Jay. Turtle and Drama accompany the girls to their house for sex, but Turtle eventually has enough of his date's comments and blames her for the accident, causing the girls to kick them out. Vince then decides to get Turtle and Drama to go with him on a trip to Cabo San Lucas.

== Production ==
=== Development ===
The episode was written by series creator Doug Ellin and executive producer Rob Weiss, and directed by Mark Mylod. This was Ellin's 23rd writing credit, Weiss's eleventh writing credit, and Mylod's second directing credit.

== Reception ==
=== Viewers ===
In its original American broadcast, "Dog Day Afternoon" was seen by an estimated 3.85 million household viewers with a 2.3/6 in the 18–49 demographics. This means that 2.3 percent of all households with televisions watched the episode, while 6 percent of all of those watching television at the time of the broadcast watched it. This was a slight increase in viewership from the previous episode, which was watched by an estimated 3.77 million household viewers with a 2.0/5 in the 18–49 demographics.

=== Critical reviews ===
"Dog Day Afternoon" received positive reviews from critics. Ahsan Haque of IGN gave the episode an "amazing" 9.1 out of 10 and wrote, "While this episode didn't do much to advance the storyline of Ari trying to get back his top client, the situation with Lloyd and Lester was extremely engaging. It was nice to see Ari's human side again. As long as it doesn't happen too often, it's nice to see that he's at least got some principles. Once more the duo of Ari and Lloyd steal the spotlight from Vince and his friends, but all three of the episode's plot threads were fulfilling and highly entertaining."

Alan Sepinwall wrote, "The dog stuff was mildly amusing for a few minutes but the double dating stuff was pure pain. Ari and Lloyd, on the other hand? I could watch an entire series built around those two, even if the other guys never showed up again." Trish Wethman of TV Guide wrote, "I knew that in the end, Ari wouldn't let Lloyd take one for the team. Jeremy Piven and Rex Lee have such great chemistry and play off each other so well, I've started to find myself waiting for their scenes."

Paul Katz of Entertainment Weekly wrote, "As comic relief, is there any duo on TV better then Kevin Dillon and Jerry Ferrara? Piven is good, but bring on the Emmy love for these two." Jonathan Toomey of TV Squad wrote, "So at this point, I almost feel like we need to start a pool. How many episodes before Vince ends up with Ari again? It's going to happen, but I'm thinking not until season four. Once Amanda drops him, I want to see how Vince functions completely on his own. So based on what this may be setting up, I'll give this episode a 5."

Emmanuelle Chriqui submitted this episode for consideration for Outstanding Supporting Actress in a Comedy Series at the 59th Primetime Emmy Awards.
