= Malibooty =

- Entourage episode
- Episode no.: Season 4 Episode 3
- Directed by: Ken Whittingham
- Written by: Rob Weiss
- Cinematography by: Anthony Hardwick
- Editing by: David Rogers
- Original release date: July 1, 2007
- Running time: 26 minutes

Guest appearances
- Maury Chaykin as Harvey Weingard (special guest star); Dennis Hopper as Himself (special guest star); Lisa Rinna as Donna Devaney; Colleen Camp as Marjorie; Mini Andén as Samantha; Sal Lopez as Billy's Film Editor; Jeff Doucette as Himself; Max Gail as Himself; Mickey Jones as Himself; Chuck Zito as Himself

Episode chronology
← Previous "The First Cut Is the Deepest"	Next → "Sorry, Harvey"

"Malibooty" is the third episode of the fourth season of the American comedy-drama television series Entourage. It is the 45th overall episode of the series and was written by executive producer Rob Weiss, and directed by Ken Whittingham. It originally aired on HBO on July 1, 2007.

The series chronicles the acting career of Vincent Chase, a young A-list movie star, and his childhood friends from Queens, New York City, as they attempt to further their nascent careers in Los Angeles. In the episode, Vince meets with actor Dennis Hopper and finds himself in trouble when he makes a $100,000 bet. Meanwhile, Eric tries to salvage Medellín, while Drama and Turtle have a double date.

According to Nielsen Media Research, the episode was seen by an estimated 2.55 million household viewers and gained a 1.6/5 ratings share among adults aged 18–49. The episode received mixed reviews from critics; while Dennis Hopper was praised for his guest appearance, others expressed frustration with the storylines.

== Plot ==
Vince (Adrian Grenier) and Eric (Kevin Connolly) now have to live with Drama (Kevin Dillon) and Turtle (Jerry Ferrara) at Drama's apartment. While driving with Drama and Turtle, Vince decides to leave with a girl to a house in Malibu, where he is surprised to see she is friends with Dennis Hopper.

Eric visits Billy (Rhys Coiro) to suggest some improvements on Medellín, but Billy is angered by his comments. To complicate matters, Billy ignored Eric's idea to go to Sundance Film Festival and instead sent the unfinished cut to the Cannes Film Festival. Ari (Jeremy Piven) won't be able to interfere as Billy has final cut privilege, but suggests he could get some interested buyers to salvage the film. Drama reunites with an '90s party girl, Donna (Lisa Rinna), and brings Turtle along as his wingman so he can spend the day with Donna's friend Marjorie (Colleen Camp). However, Donna takes an interest in Turtle instead and decides to have sex with him, while Drama is left with Marjorie.

Vince gets in trouble when he bets $100,000 on a soccer match, but is relieved when he finds that the bets were never official, so he leaves with the girl. Eric meets with Harvey Weingard (Maury Chaykin), and despite the poor word of mouth on the film, he agrees to watch the film. Harvey offers to buy the film for $25 million, which Eric is willing to take as he feels the film will bomb in Cannes. Vince states that the Cannes committee had just accepted the film, and he believes that there is still potential in the film.

== Production ==
=== Development ===
The episode was written by executive producer Rob Weiss, and directed by Ken Whittingham. This was Weiss' 14th writing credit, and Whittingham's third directing credit.

== Reception ==
=== Viewers ===
In its original American broadcast, "Malibooty" was seen by an estimated 2.55 million household viewers with a 1.6/5 in the 18–49 demographics. This means that 1.6 percent of all households with televisions watched the episode, while 5 percent of all of those watching television at the time of the broadcast watched it. This was a 12% increase in viewership from the previous episode, which was watched by an estimated 2.27 million household viewers with a 1.2/4 in the 18–49 demographics.

=== Critical reviews ===
"Malibooty" received mixed reviews from critics. Ahsan Haque of IGN gave the episode a "great" 8.7 out of 10 and wrote, "Overall, it was a great mix of meaningless fun with just enough development of the ongoing Medellin arc. We even get the pleasure of witnessing a truly hilarious argument between Eric and Ari, with Lloyd in the background. It all comes together to make for yet another must watch episode of Entourage."

Alan Sepinwall wrote, "Just a bad, bad half-hour of television." Adam Sternbergh of Vulture wrote, "Because Billy entered Medellin to Cannes without asking, and if it gets rejected, no one will distribute the film, at least so says the increasingly underused Ari, who appears in this episode for only a few brief seconds, like blessed drops of condensation in an otherwise arid desert of enjoyment." Trish Wethman of TV Guide wrote, "Raise your hand if you are officially sick to death of hearing about "Medellin." Is it just me? I feel like this story line has dragged on forever with no resolution in sight. It is like an anchor weighing down all the humor and fun."

Dawnie Walton of Entertainment Weekly wrote, "for those of us who remember Entourage's more interesting days, last night's Malibooty continued a frustrating pattern of ratcheting up tension only to let it seep out again. And I had high hopes for this episode, since last week's left Vince and E staunchly at odds as to whether Medellin sucked or not." Jonathan Toomey of TV Squad wrote, "I know a lot of people have been displeased with the recent string of episodes. I agree. The remaining half of season three was atrocious. But you can't deny that season four feels different. It's delving much deeper into the mentalities of these characters (mainly Vince and E) and we're getting a much bigger sense of what they put up with on a daily basis."

Kevin Connolly submitted this episode for consideration for Outstanding Lead Actor in a Comedy Series, while Dennis Hopper submitted it for Outstanding Guest Actor in a Comedy Series, and Ken Whittingham submitted it for Outstanding Directing for a Comedy Series at the 60th Primetime Emmy Awards.
