= Manic Monday (Entourage) =

- Entourage episode
- Episode no.: Season 3 Episode 15
- Directed by: Julian Farino
- Written by: Doug Ellin; Marc Abrams; Michael Benson
- Cinematography by: Rob Sweeney
- Editing by: Jonathan Scott Corn
- Original release date: April 22, 2007
- Running time: 23 minutes

Guest appearances
- Beverly D'Angelo as Barbara Miller (special guest star); Carla Gugino as Amanda Daniels (special guest star); Bryan Callen as Rob Rubino; Nora Dunn as Dr. Marcus; Laraine Newman as Jane; Deborah Theaker as Dr. Marcus' Receptionist; Jason Sklar as Rob's Eyesight Tester; Sundeep Ahuja as Rob's Assistant

Episode chronology
← Previous "Dog Day Afternoon"	Next → "Gotcha"

"Manic Monday" is the fifteenth episode of the third season of the American comedy-drama television series Entourage. It is the 37th overall episode of the series and was written by series creator Doug Ellin, Marc Abrams, and Michael Benson, and directed by co-executive producer Julian Farino. It originally aired on HBO on April 22, 2007.

The series chronicles the acting career of Vincent Chase, a young A-list movie star, and his childhood friends from Queens, New York City, as they attempt to further their nascent careers in Los Angeles. In the episode, Amanda pressures Vince in getting an answer for Glimpses of the Moon, while Ari feels his behavior is changing.

According to Nielsen Media Research, the episode was seen by an estimated 3.63 million household viewers and gained a 2.0/5 ratings share among adults aged 18–49. The episode received mixed reviews from critics; while Piven received praise for his performance, the rest of the episode's subplots were criticized for their lack of progress. For the episode, Jeremy Piven won Outstanding Supporting Actor in a Comedy Series at the 59th Primetime Emmy Awards.

== Plot ==
Amanda (Carla Gugino) continues pressuring Vince (Adrian Grenier) in accepting Glimpses of the Moon. When she becomes more demanding, Eric (Kevin Connolly) promises to get an answer by the end of the day. However, the boys read the script and all conclude that the story is boring.

Melissa (Perrey Reeves) gets Ari (Jeremy Piven) to therapy, feeling that his new behavior in trying to avoid Vince is impacting his life. Ari rebuffs this claim, although he later ignores a request by Barbara (Beverly D'Angelo) in firing an employee after the man says his wife left him. Ari interrupts the therapist, Dr. Marcus (Nora Dunn), during her break, asking for her help. While she suggests he could improve his life by using compassion, Ari still wants to go back to his old persona. He enthusiastically returns to his office, and happily fires the employee, telling the others that he will be less tolerant in their activities.

Vince and Eric dine with Amanda to explain the decision in passing on the project, upsetting Amanda as she believes Ari is influencing Vince. During this, Vince compliments Amanda's looks, surprising her. The boys debate on the aftermath, questioning if Vince should find a new agent as his relationship with Amanda might be impacted. Vince is then called by Amanda, who asks him if he thinks she is "sexy". When Vince says yes, Amanda suggests they should have sex to liberate any sexual tension from their working relationship. Vince agrees, and leaves to meet her within 20 minutes.

== Production ==
=== Development ===
The episode was written by series creator Doug Ellin, Marc Abrams, and Michael Benson, and directed by co-executive producer Julian Farino. This was Ellin's 24th writing credit, Abrams' third writing credit, Benson's third writing credit, and Farino's 20th directing credit.

== Reception ==
=== Viewers ===
In its original American broadcast, "Manic Monday" was seen by an estimated 3.63 million household viewers with a 2.0/5 in the 18–49 demographics. This means that 2 percent of all households with televisions watched the episode, while 5 percent of all of those watching television at the time of the broadcast watched it. This was a 6% decrease in viewership from the previous episode, which was watched by an estimated 3.85 million household viewers with a 2.3/6 in the 18–49 demographics.

=== Critical reviews ===
"Manic Monday" received mixed reviews from critics. Ahsan Haque of IGN gave the episode a "good" 7 out of 10 and wrote, "This episode was actually shorter in length that the previous episode, and as such, didn't have much in terms of plot advancement. Basically all that really happened was that Ari lost his edge, but got it back by the end of the episode, and Vince ends up deciding to jump into bed with his agent."

Alan Sepinwall wrote, "The Ari stuff was funny, with both Bryan Callen and Nora Dunn working as good foils, but I'm so bored I'm not sure I'll even want to keep watching once HBO starts showing the episodes I haven't seen yet." Trish Wethman of TV Guide wrote, "It was quite amusing to watch Ari on the golf course with Dr. Marcus, experiencing a sort of reverse breakthrough as he slowly realized that he needs to stop evolving and reclaim his anger."

Paul Katz of Entertainment Weekly wrote, "And so Ari came to a crossroads: become a better person or remain the agent he's always been. Happily for us, Ari choose the low road and returned to the office for a round of firing, stealing candy bars from chubby coworkers, and cursing up a storm." Jonathan Toomey of TV Squad wrote, "This was an extremely solid episode and quite possibly the best one we've gotten from season three. The only one I can recall liking as much was "Vegas Baby, Vegas," and that one was good partly due to it not having any real ties to the rest of the season. It sat by itself. This episode sticks right to the story line we've been running with and that makes it all that much better in my book."

Jeremy Piven submitted this episode for consideration for Outstanding Supporting Actor in a Comedy Series at the 59th Primetime Emmy Awards. He would win the award, which made it his second win in a row.
