= Johnny "Drama" Alves =

American television personality

Johnny Alves
- Other name: Johnny "Drama" Alves
- Occupations: Television personality, musician, actor

Johnny Alves, also known as Johnny "Drama" Alves, is an American television personality, musician and actor. Alves is the real-life inspiration for Johnny "Drama" Chase, the Entourage character portrayed by Kevin Dillon.

A 2008 Elle profile described Alves as the real-life "Johnny Drama" and reported that Donnie Wahlberg had hired him to help keep Mark Wahlberg out of trouble. The profile discussed Alves's longtime friendship with Wahlberg and his family roots in Plymouth, Massachusetts.

In a 2015 Rolling Stone feature about the real-life figures behind Entourage, series creator Doug Ellin described Alves as the closest real-life match to his fictional counterpart. The article says that Alves auditioned to portray both Johnny Drama and Ari Gold, later appeared on Wahlburgers, and fronted the funk band Johnny Drama and His Funky Entourage.

During promotion for the 2015 Entourage film, Alves appeared with Dillon in coverage highlighting the meeting between the real-life and fictional Johnny Drama.
