= Viking Quest =

Fictional television show

Viking Quest poster

Viking Quest is a fictional TV show within a show in the TV series Entourage. It is referred to both by fictional characters and celebrities playing versions of themselves as a real show.

Within the show's fictional universe, Viking Quest is presented as a cult science fiction and fantasy show. The show's relative lack of success and critical reception next to its fictional spin-off, Angel Quest, is a play on the same dynamic between the real-life shows Hercules: The Legendary Journeys and Xena: Warrior Princess.

The conceit that Viking Quest is a real show was extended to promotional videos and a Flash game involving its star, Johnny Drama, outside of the show.

== Fictional portrayal ==
Johnny "Drama" Chase at San Diego Comic-Con

The show featured Johnny "Drama" Chase as the lead character, Tarvold. Tarvold has a signature exclamation, "VICTORY!!!". Tarvold hails from Northumbria. His ship is called the Gokstad (a reference to the Gokstad ship). Set during the mid-10th century AD in the Orkney Islands, Viking Quest follows the exploits of Viking hero, Tarvold, as he and his clan sail the high seas. A legend in the making, Tarvold had become one of the most feared and notorious Vikings scarcely a year after he had grown his beard. It was then that he dared to steal the gold of Vali, Norse God of Revenge. His childhood friend and nemesis, Thorfinn Skull-Splitter, betrayed him and Tarvold was caught stealing the gold. As retribution for his deed, Tarvold was forced to loot and plunder in Vali's name. As he sailed the high seas doing Vali's bidding, Tarvold had to stay one step ahead of Thorfinn who constantly attempted to thwart Tarvold's progress and steal the treasure that he needed to repay his debt to Vali.

In the show, Viking Quest aired in 1997 on the Sci-Fi channel, airing for one season of 22 episodes. The complete series was later released on DVD. The show is portrayed as having developed something of a cult following, and is especially popular in France. In 2008, Viking Quest was re-released as a Special Edition DVD and promoted with a video game.

Vanessa Angel appeared as Angel in three episodes of Viking Quest. She then went on to star in a spin-off series called Angel Quest, which ran "5 times longer" than Viking Quest. This is a sly reference to the fact that in real life Vanessa Angel was originally cast as Xena in a three-episode arc for the television show Hercules: The Legendary Journeys. She dropped out; the part of Xena went to Lucy Lawless; and the subsequent spin-off series Xena: Warrior Princess went on to significantly eclipse its predecessor, both critically and commercially.

== Real-life promotion ==
In September 2008, HBO and Fuel Industries produced a Viking Quest game website as part of a marketing campaign for the 5th season of Entourage. The site featured a Flash game, and claimed that a Viking Quest game is coming soon to consoles. It also claimed that the show is being re-released on DVD.
