= Johnny "Drama" Chase =

Fictional character on Entourage

Johnny Drama
- Entourage character
- First appearance: "Entourage" (2004)
- Last appearance: Entourage (2015)
- Portrayed by: Kevin Dillon

In-universe information
- Alias: None
- Occupation: Actor
- Relatives: Vincent Chase (half-brother); Rita Chase (mother)
- Home: Queens, New York City

Jonathan "Drama" Chase is a fictional character in the comedy-drama television series Entourage and its film sequel. The character is portrayed by Kevin Dillon. He is the older half-brother and manager of fictional actor Vincent Chase, and is known for his efforts to revive his acting career while navigating the entertainment industry. The character was inspired by Johnny "Drama" Alves, a longtime friend and associate of Mark Wahlberg, whose personality and experiences contributed to the development of the character.

== Fictional biography ==
Drama is the older half-brother of popular actor Vincent Chase. Drama has been a C-list actor for most of his career, best known for his starring role as Tarvold in the cult television series Viking Quest. Later in Entourage, he is cast in another series, Five Towns, which scores 16 million viewers on its premiere. He left the hit show after a run-in with a TV executive. Not long after, he was given a holding deal by the network for his own show.

In the first season of Entourage, Drama has not had a serious acting gig for three years. Instead, he is Vincent's chef and fitness consultant, often watching out for his brother and making sure he eats right. His personality is alternately macho and warm-hearted, pompous and insecure. His acting range is limited by a wooden style, but he constantly brings up the bit roles he has played over the years in such movies and television shows as Barbershop, Melrose Place, Nash Bridges, The Commish, A Different World, Pacific Blue, Full House, 21 Jump Street, Beverly Hills, 90210, and Star Trek: Voyager, as well as a national television commercial for the herpes drug Valtrex, and tries to give acting and general Hollywood-related advice to his brother. For example, he helped Vince decide which agency to sign with based on a point system after Vince was thinking about firing Ari. He starred as Tarvold in the fictional science fiction series Viking Quest, which spawned his catchphrase "Victory!". In the episode "Drive", Drama reveals he is a Razzie Award winner. He also revealed that he's directed a couple of short films in the episode "Welcome to the Jungle", after overhearing a conversation where Eric threatens to fire Billy Walsh from the production of Medellin.

He is always looking to capitalize on Vincent's success, which pays off with a supporting role in a film called Queens Boulevard, a bit part in another film called Medellin, and an appearance in a flashy Chinese commercial that Vincent does. Although he occasionally finds his little brother's charity emasculating, he almost never turns it down. While it would seem that he is nothing more than a leech, Johnny cares deeply for his brother and the rest of the group, springing to their aid when needed. Johnny is a member of the Screen Actors Guild.

Drama lands a role as the "older Irish brother" in Five Towns, an Edward Burns television pilot; Burns felt he owed Drama because Drama turned down a role in Burns' successful real-life film The Brothers McMullen, forcing Burns to play it himself. The pilot was picked up in the episode "The Resurrection". After the Five Towns pilot performed very well, Drama effectively resumed a successful career and bought a $1.5 million condominium. He was mistakenly offered a lead role in Rush Hour 3 by Brett Ratner when Ratner's assistant misread the credits in Drama's show and picked Drama instead of his younger co-star. However, Drama still was to coerce Ratner to give him a role as a French bus driver. During the hiatus of Five Towns, Drama followed Eric, Vince, and Turtle to the Medellin set and successfully secured a role in the film as a military leader who infiltrates Escobar's compound in the movie's climax. However, before this, Drama stirred up trouble by claiming to have received a handjob from the film's lead actress (portrayed by Sofia Vergara), who director Billy Walsh was infatuated with. It is unclear whether this handjob actually occurred, as Turtle finds it unbelievable, coupled with Drama's tendency to exaggerate his macho image, particularly on camera. In the Season 4 season finale, while at the Cannes Film Festival in France greeting the large fan base and cult following of Viking Quest, Drama meets and becomes involved with Jacqueline and begins a long distance relationship with her after he gets back to LA. Drama increased his profile in France inadvertently by having sex on the beach with Jacqueline for three hours. In the end, they stop after he sees a large crowd, and his friends and brother cheer him on.

Drama claims to be Irish and Chilean and may be part Japanese. In "Gary's Desk", Turtle and Vincent have their own offices in Eric's company, The Murphy Group.

Though it is never shown that Drama is fluent in multiple languages, he has quoted words in Spanish, French, Yiddish, and Hebrew.

In the Season Five finale, Johnny becomes the co-owner of a Queens bar with Turtle's cousin Ronnie. Ronnie then had the bar renamed "Johnny Drama's". After that, he became a partner with the owner, who had to settle a gambling debt problem.

In Season Six, Five Towns is still filming and is still a successful show. This changes for Drama when he threatens Five Towns NBC network executive Dan Coakley after he suspects Coakley is trying to sleep with Turtle's girlfriend, Jamie-Lynn Sigler. Coakley decides that instead of firing Drama, he will convince the writers to torture and humiliate Drama's character on Five Towns. Drama soon decides that he has enough of his character getting bad scenes and tries to get out of his contract on Five Towns and sign on to star on Melrose Place 2009 after Melrose Place producer Phil Yagoda offered him to audition for a role. Drama had been fired from the original Melrose Place series in 1993.

In the season finale, Drama's agent Lloyd Lee resigns from his secretary position at Ari Gold's agency to accept an offer from Gold's rival, Adam Davies, at the Terrence McQuewick Agency, where Gold was fired in 2005. Drama becomes unstable after hearing of Lloyd's departure. Ari and Lloyd compete to get him out of his Five Towns contract and onto Melrose Place in 2009. Drama is impressed by Ari's capability, so he verbally agrees to make Ari his permanent agent. However, an impassioned speech by Lloyd convinces Drama that he should remain with Lloyd, who is more sincere and concerned for Drama. At the first Melrose Place audition in 2009, Drama fears rejection and has a mild heart attack and mental breakdown, urinating in his pants. Drama then eventually decides that he is an actor and must redo the audition. He does well at the audition, but he is turned down by the network for being "too old". Phil Yagoda then notifies Drama that the network has decided that he is ready to have a series created for him and offers an exclusive holding deal, which Drama had never had before. Delighted, Drama, and Vince head to Italy to film Vince's new movie. His quote is now at least $100,000 (per episode) higher than it was on Five Towns, for which he made $75,000 per episode.

In Season Eight, Drama does voice acting for a new animated series called Johnny's Bananas, an urban comedy where all characters are primarily apes and monkeys. Andrew Dice Clay is his co-star, and the show was created by Billy Walsh. He is also cast as the lead actor in a TV movie adapted from a script written by Vince and Walsh.

=== Interests ===
Drama loves the Irish band U2; his motto for their concerts is "Floor level or bust". Drama prefers José Cuervo tequila and Johnnie Walker Blue. He also likes enjoying "a good steak, a bottle of red, a couple cigars, and some good conversation." He has attended an S&M seminar.

== Relation to Vincent ==
Viewers of the series are shown that Drama and Vince are, in fact, related. Turtle once emphasized that Johnny was Vince's half-brother and that Vincent thought Drama was his cousin until Vince was 14. On the HBO Entourage web site, Drama is also referred to as Vince's half-brother.

Vince and Drama share the same last name. They appear to have the same mother in the episode "Aquamom" when Johnny calls himself her "firstborn.". However, Drama calls Vincent's mother "your mom" in the episode "My Maserati Does 185". However, this could possibly be explained as him referring to her informally as mom if she was a main mother figure in his life.

Drama may simply be very close to Vince's mother, Rita Chase, due to the fact that the line in "My Maserati Does 185" about their shared father is a definitive genetical statement said in a genuine sense. This means that Rita may not actually be Drama's biological mother, but either his stepmother or adoptive mother, with Vince and Johnny having the same biological father, who was an alcoholic and left the family when both were relatively young.

Rita Chase may indeed be Johnny's biological mother. His line in "Aquamom", along with the fact that "Aquamom" came after "My Maserati Does 185, may support this theory. This creates, what Entourage creator Doug Ellin has referred to as an auto-perspective angle, in which the audience can assume one or the other in reference to Johnny's actual parentage.

During Season Six, Johnny mentions his insecurities to the executive producer of Five Towns, saying, "It could be my own insecurity about feeling my mother loved Vince more than she does me", alluding that Johnny's mother is Rita. It is believed that Johnny was born shortly after his parents left high school, thus explaining the age gap between himself and Vince.

Drama is at least nine years older than Vince. (Note: In "I Love You Too", Vince mentions that the first concert he attended was a U2 gig when he was 7, and Drama drove him there. Upon hearing this, Turtle asks how old Drama really is, and he responds "31". Also in this episode, Drama waves an Irish flag, yet Vince and his mother seem to be Italian.)

Doug Ellin has mentioned on his Podcast, Victory the Podcast, that he originally had Johnny as Vince's half brother through a shared father, while later changing this relationship to a shared mother for the season 3 episode "Aquamom". This was done because Doug wanted to have a shot of all four moms coming off the plane together. This was discussed in the Victory Podcast episode titled "Season 3 Episode 1 Aquamoms."Victory the Podcast

== Relationship history ==
=== Relationships prior to the show ===
- Drama had a relationship with a girl named Stacy LaRosa. Apparently, Drama ended their relationship prior to Valentine's Day, so he would not have to buy her a present.
- Drama had anal sex with a girl named Jess Mancini during high school, and he made her ride her bike home afterwards.
- Drama was married at one time, for nine days. The marriage was annulled.
- Drama wanted to dump Rhona Davies, who knew about it and moved to Australia. Drama had to wait two years before he could tell her they were through.

=== Relationships during the show ===
- In the first season, Drama had a fling with a muscular woman. He ended this relationship because she was too tough for him, and he felt emasculated.
- In the second season, Drama had a relationship with Vanessa Angel. It is unclear how long the relationship lasted.
- In the second season, Drama had a devil's trio with Turtle and Cassie, the boys' driver at the Sundance Film Festival, in the episode The Sundance Kids".
- In the third season, Drama fools around with a female dog owner in the episode "Dog Day Afternoon". The relationship didn't last because of Turtle, so Drama was unable to see the girl in the future.
- In the third season, Ken, Drama's personal masseuse in Las Vegas, prepares himself to have sex with Drama after he mistakes Drama's intention when he calls him to his room for a massage in the middle of the night.
- In the fourth season, in the episode "Malibooty", Drama rekindles a romance with a '90s party girl, Donna Deveny, and brings Turtle along as his wingman.
- In the fourth season, Drama has sex with a woman while both are dressed in animal costumes. The woman makes squirrel-like sounds and gestures, while Drama wears a pink rabbit suit and head, simply going along with it so he could have sex. This episode covered somewhat in depth the "Furry" lifestyle of being attracted to costumes and stuffed animals or fluffy animal-type suits.
- In the fourth season, Drama found a new girlfriend, Jacqueline, at the Cannes Festival and had sex with her on the beach. Later in the fifth season, Jacqueline ends her romantic relationship with Drama due to his obsession with her.
- In the sixth season, Drama has sex with a girl named Kelly who works at a clothing store. She apparently had sex with Seth Rogen when she was drunk.
- In the sixth season, Drama had sex with a girl named Tara, three months before Eric had sex with her. Tara was on a short list of suspected women who may have given Drama a sexually transmitted disease.

== Marketing ==
In April 2015, Diageo, which produces Johnnie Walker scotch whisky, produced the Johnny Drama scotch whisky, named Johnny Drama, to promote the release of the movie version of Entourage.

== Fictional filmography ==
Year	Title	Role	Notes
-	Miami Vice	Cocaine Informant	guest star
-	The New New Love Boat	Merrill Stubing	pilot never aired
1987	Barfly	Extra	uncredited; 3 days' work
1988	License to Drive	Unknown	
1988	227	Building Inspector	guest star
1989	A Different World	Drunk Frat Guy	guest star
1989	Booker	Dead Body	guest star
1990	Cop Rock	Singing Felon	guest star
1991	L.A. Law	Mute Clerk	guest star
1991	Beverly Hills, 90210	Eddie	guest star; Donna's stalker
1991	Point Break	Stoned Surfer #5	uncredited
1993	NYPD Blue	Dead Body	guest star; Kevin Dillon actually guest-starred in three episodes of NYPD Blue as a police officer.
1993	Melrose Place		recurring character
1993	Amongst Friends	Kid in Trunk	
1994	The Crow	small part	
1994	Full House	Uncle Jesse's Tough-Guy Nephew	guest star
1994	The Commish	Bulimic Pedophile	guest star
1994	227		guest star
1994	Friends	Guy in Laundry Room	The One With the East German Laundry Detergent
1994	Concrete Heat		Cancelled after one week
1994–1995	My So-Called Life		guest star; Drama mentions a stunt in which he falls down a flight of stairs
1995	Cornelius and Son		recurring guest star
1995	Last One Left	Taxi Driver	guest part
1996	Beautiful Girls	stand-in	Fired for fighting with Matt Dillon
1997	Pacific Blue	Officer Ross Harper	recurring guest star
1997	Nash Bridges	Retarded Brother	guest star, "Season 3, Episode 7"
1997	Viking Quest	Tarvold	Drama's first lead role; co-starred with Vanessa Angel
1998	Kissing a Fool	Cubs Fan	
1998	Star Trek: Voyager	Klingon	guest star
2001	7th Heaven	High School Swimmer With Alopecia	
2002	Barbershop	Customer	uncredited; scenes cut from film
2003	The Practice	Law Clerk	guest star
2004	Law & Order: Special Victims Unit	Dead Body	guest star
2004	Crossing Jordan	Bank Robber	guest star
2004	Head On	Thug	appears with his half-brother Vince
2004	Jimmy Kimmel Live!	Himself	surprise appearance on the show with Vince
2005	Queens Boulevard	Bookie	small bit-part with Vince; Scenes initially cut from film but inserted back in by director Billy Walsh
2005	Chinese energy drink television commercial	Unnamed role	cameo with Vince
2005	Celebrity Justice	Himself	Appeared on the show after being arrested for destroying a stranger's windshield with Eric's golf club after an altercation on the interstate
2006	Gotcha!	Himself	target of a prank involving Chuck Liddell, in the pilot episode of Pauly Shore's celebrity hidden camera show (a la Punk'd).
2006–2009	Five Towns	Quinn	Drama's second-ever lead role. About five Irish brothers who "run" the five towns of Long Island. Produced by Edward Burns, who also directed the pilot. Has shot at least 87 episodes. Currently airing on NBC. Left the show during season four.
2007	Rush Hour 3	French Bus Driver	Scenes cut from film
2007	Medellin	Colombian Soldier	cameo; appears alongside Vince
2008	Corso (TV series about the life of ESPN analyst Lee Corso	Kirk Herbstreit's brother Tim	minor role
2008	The View	Himself	The cast of Five Towns made an appearance as special guests on the show.
2011	Johnny's Bananas	Johnny	Lead Role (Voice). Co-starred with Andrew Dice Clay. Cancelled after one season.
2011	Tvmovie	Human	Lead Role in Billy Walsh's Tv movie aired in CBS.
2012	Hyde	Human	Won Golden Globe Award for Best Supporting Actor – Motion Picture
2012	TMZ	Himself	Mr. Skin for Best Masturbation Scene
2016	Antelope Man	Craig Davidson Jr.	Won Anchovie Weekly Actor of the Week.
2019	Game of Thrones	White Walker	The Long Night
