= Kevin Dillon =

American actor (born 1965)

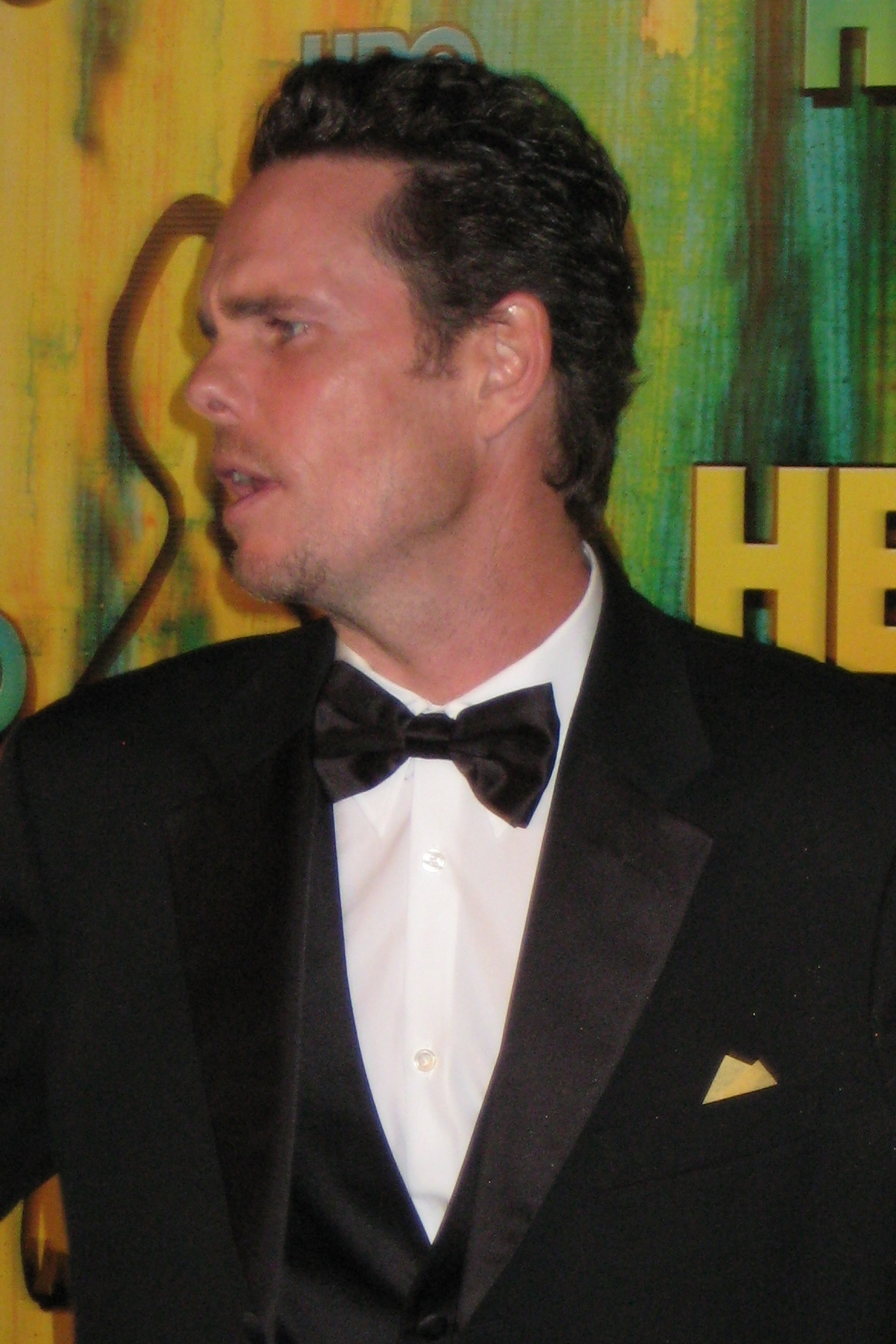
- Dillon in 2008
- Born: Kevin Brady Dillon; August 19, 1965 (age 61); New Rochelle, New York, U.S.
- Occupation: Actor
- Years active: 1983–present
- Spouse: Jane Stuart (m. 2006; div. 2019)
- Children: 2
- Relatives: Matt Dillon (brother); Jim Raymond (great uncle); Alex Raymond (great uncle)

Kevin Brady Dillon (born August 19, 1965) is an American actor. Born in New York, he first received recognition for his starring role in the comedy-drama film Heaven Help Us (1985) before his breakthrough with his supporting role as Bunny in the war film Platoon (1986). Dillon followed this up with his portrayal of musician John Densmore in the biographical film The Doors (1991), as well as starring roles in the films The Blob (1988) and No Escape (1994).

After a main role as Paulie DeLucca on the CBS series That's Life (2000–2002), Dillon experienced a career resurgence with his role as Johnny "Drama" Chase on the HBO comedy series Entourage (2004–2011), which earned him three nominations for the Primetime Emmy Award for Outstanding Supporting Actor in a Comedy Series, as well as a nomination for the Golden Globe Award for Best Supporting Actor – Series, Miniseries or Television Film. He reprised his Entourage role as Chase in the 2015 film of the same name.

Outside of Entourage, Dillon starred in the film Hotel for Dogs (2009) and had a main role as Bert Lansing on the CBS sitcom How to Be a Gentleman (2011–2012). He portrayed Jack L. Warner in a starring role in the biographical film Reagan (2024).

== Early life ==
Dillon was born Kevin Brady Dillon on August 19, 1965, in New Rochelle, New York and was raised in Mamaroneck, New York. He is the son of Mary Ellen, a homemaker, and Paul Dillon, a portrait painter, sales manager, and golf coach at Fordham University. He has a sister and four brothers, one of whom is actor Matt Dillon. His paternal grandmother was the sister of comic strip artist Alex Raymond, the creator of Flash Gordon and Jim Raymond, a cartoonist. He is of Irish American descent. He graduated from Mamaroneck High School.

== Career ==
Dillon began acting in both television and films in the 1980s. In 1983, Dillon played Arnold Norberry in the television film No Big Deal. His first major role was Ed Rooney in the film Heaven Help Us which was directed by Michael Dinner. He received wide attention for his role as the psychopathic soldier Bunny in the 1986 film Platoon. In 1988, he portrayed Brian Flagg in a remake of the 1958 American science fiction film The Blob. It received mixed reviews but was praised for its special effects and has since gained a cult following. Other notable film roles from that period included War Party (1988) and in 1989 he starred as 'Sam' in the movie; Immidiate Family, No Escape (1994), and The Doors (1991) in which he played drummer John Densmore.

Much of Dillon's work in the 2000s was in television, including the CBS series That's Life as Paul DeLucca and the Fox series 24 as Lonnie McRae. He appeared in the 2006 film Poseidon, a remake of The Poseidon Adventure. He was on Donald J. Trump's Fabulous World of Golf on the Golf Channel in April 2010. He appeared in the family comedy film Hotel for Dogs (2009) which collected $117 million at the worldwide box office.

Dillon co-starred on the HBO comedy drama television series Entourage playing Johnny "Drama" Chase, for which he received Emmy nominations in 2007, 2008, and 2009. He also received a Golden Globe nomination in 2008 for performing on the show. The series concluded on September 11, 2011, after eight seasons. Dillon reprised his role as Johnny Chase in the series' film adaptation, Entourage (2015). The project was officially announced in 2013, and filming began around Los Angeles in February 2014. It received mixed reviews from critics and grossed $49 million worldwide.

In 2011, Dillon appeared in the CBS comedy sitcom How to Be a Gentleman portraying Iraq war veteran Bert Lansing. In 2018, he appeared in the drama film Dirt and portrayed Jimmy O'Shea in two episodes of police procedural drama series Blue Bloods.

== Personal life ==
Dillon married actress Jane Stuart in Las Vegas on April 21, 2006. Entourage cast member Jerry Ferrara was his best man and Kevin Connolly, another series co-star, walked Stuart down the aisle after Dillon shouted "Victory!" (a tribute to his character's work on the metafictional TV series Viking Quest). Their first child was born on May 17, 2006, in Beverly Hills. Dillon also has a daughter from a previous relationship. Stuart filed a divorce petition in July 2016. The divorce was finalized in November 2019, and Dillon was ordered to make equalization payments to Stuart totaling $1,705,594 and an additional $242,411 for her share of a brokerage account.

== Filmography ==
=== Film ===
Year	Title	Role	Notes
1983	No Big Deal	Arnold Norberry	Television film
1985	Heaven Help Us	Ed Rooney	
1986	The Delta Force	Delta Force Member	Uncredited
1986	Platoon	"Bunny"	
1987	Dear America: Letters Home from Vietnam	Jack	
1988	Remote Control	Cosmo	
1988	The Rescue	J.J. Merrill	
1988	The Blob	Brian Flagg	
1988	War Party	"Skitty" Harris	
1989	Immediate Family	Sam	
1989	When He's Not a Stranger	Rick	Television film
1991	The Doors	John Densmore	
1992	A Midnight Clear	Corporal Mel Avakin	
1992	Frankie's House	Sean Flynn	
1994	No Escape	Casey	
1996	Criminal Hearts	Rafe	
1996	Gone in the Night	David Dowaliby	
1996	True Crime	Tony Campbell	
1996	The Pathfinder	Pathfinder / Hawkeye	
1997	Stag	Dan Kane	
1997	Medusa's Child	Jerry Carnel	
1998	Misbegotten	Billy "Crapshoot"	
1999	Hidden Agenda	David McLean	
2000	Interstate 84	Vinnie	
2004	Vampires: Out for Blood	Detective Hank Holten	
2006	The Foursome	Rick Foster	
2006	Poseidon	Larry "Lucky Larry"	
2009	Hotel for Dogs	Carl Scudder	
2010	Teenage Paparazzo	Himself	Documentary film
2013	Compulsion	Fred	
2014	The Throwaways	Dan Fisher	
2015	Entourage	Johnny "Drama" Chase	
2015	Underdogs	Old Jake	
2018	Dirt	Rick Radden	
2018	Brothers in Arms	Himself	Documentary film
2019	Buddy Games	Doc	
2022	A Day to Die	Connor	
2022	Frank and Penelope	Sheriff	
2022	Hot Seat	Orlando Friar	
2022	On the Line	Justin	
2022	Wire Room	HSI Special Agent Justin Rosa	
2023	Mob Land	Trey	
2023	Buddy Games: Spring Awakening	Doc	
2024	Reagan	Jack L. Warner	
2026	Christmas at Moose Lake	Patrick Dawson	
TBA	Complex, Texas		Post-production

=== Television ===
Year	Title	Role	Notes
1993	Tales from the Crypt	Les Wilton	Episode: "House of Horror"
1998–2000	NYPD Blue	Officer Neil Baker	3 episodes
2000–2002	That's Life	Paul DeLucca	36 episodes
2003	24	Lonnie McRae	3 episodes
2003	Karen Sisco	Bob Salcheck	Episode: "Dumb Bunnies"
2003	Maple Ave	Dan	Episode: "Jenny's Reasons"
2004–2011	Entourage	Johnny "Drama" Chase	96 episodes
2011–2012	How to Be a Gentleman	Bert Lansing	9 episodes
2011	The Simpsons	Himself (voice)	Episode: "The Ten-Per-Cent Solution"
2015–2016	TripTank	Frankie / Vinny / H (voice)	5 episodes
2017–2018	Blue Bloods	Jimmy O'Shea	Episodes: "Hard Bargain" and "Close Calls"
2021	Creepshow	Mr. Murdoch	Episode: "Model Kid"
2022	Pawn Stars	Himself	Episode: "Pawntourage"

== Awards and nominations ==
Primetime Emmy Award

Year	Category	Nominated work	Result
2007	Outstanding Supporting Actor in a Comedy Series	Entourage	Nominated
2008	Outstanding Supporting Actor in a Comedy Series	Entourage	Nominated
2009	Outstanding Supporting Actor in a Comedy Series	Entourage	Nominated

Golden Globe Award

Year	Category	Nominated work	Result
2007	Best Supporting Actor – Series, Miniseries or Television Film	Entourage	Nominated
