= Entourage (American TV series) =

American comedy-drama television series

- Genre: Comedy-drama; Satire
- Created by: Doug Ellin
- Starring: Kevin Connolly; Adrian Grenier; Kevin Dillon; Jerry Ferrara; Jeremy Piven; Debi Mazar; Perrey Reeves; Rex Lee; Rhys Coiro; Gary Cole; Emmanuelle Chriqui; Scott Caan
- Opening theme: "Superhero" by Jane's Addiction
- Country of origin: United States
- Original language: English
- No. of seasons: 8
- No. of episodes: 96 (list of episodes)

Production
- Executive producers: Doug Ellin; Mark Wahlberg; Stephen Levinson; Larry Charles; Rob Weiss; Denis Biggs; Ally Musika
- Camera setup: Single-camera
- Running time: 21–35 minutes
- Production companies: Leverage Entertainment; Closest to the Hole Productions; Fly the Coop Entertainment (season 8); HBO Entertainment

Original release
- Network: HBO
- Release: July 18, 2004 – September 11, 2011

Related
- Entourage (film); Entourage (South Korea)

Entourage is an American satirical comedy-drama television series that premiered on HBO on July 18, 2004, and ended on September 11, 2011, after eight seasons. The series was created and largely written by Doug Ellin, and chronicles the acting career of Vincent Chase, a young A-list movie star, and his childhood friends from Queens, New York City, as they attempt to further their nascent careers in Los Angeles. The show's principal cast initially consisted of Kevin Connolly as Eric Murphy, Adrian Grenier as Vincent Chase, Kevin Dillon as Johnny "Drama" Chase, Jerry Ferrara as Turtle, and Jeremy Piven as Ari Gold. In later seasons, Debi Mazar, Perrey Reeves, Rex Lee, Rhys Coiro, Gary Cole, Emmanuelle Chriqui, and Scott Caan were upgraded to the main cast.

Mark Wahlberg and Stephen Levinson served as Entourage's executive producers, and its premise is loosely based on Wahlberg's experiences as an up-and-coming film star. The show is noted for its themes of male friendship and the Hollywood lifestyle, as well as its numerous celebrity guest appearances, with at least one usually appearing each episode.

During its run, Entourage received generally positive reviews from critics, apart from the last season receiving a mixed reception. The show received numerous awards and nominations throughout its run, including three straight Primetime Emmy Award for Outstanding Supporting Actor in a Comedy Series wins for Piven from 2006 to 2008, alongside the Golden Globe Award for Best Supporting Actor – Series, Miniseries or Television Film in 2007. Dillon and Connolly also received acting nominations.

An Entourage film, with most of the main cast returning, was released on June 3, 2015, serving as a sequel to the series.

== Development ==
According to Mark Wahlberg, Entourage was initially conceived when his assistant asked if he could film Wahlberg and his friends, calling them "hilarious." Other reports credit Eric Weinstein, a long-time friend of Wahlberg, with the idea of filming the actor's group of friends. However, according to Donnie Carroll, who was the inspiration for the Turtle character, the idea for a show involving an actor and his friends had come from him. It had originated as a book idea, centered on Carroll's own life and his experiences with Wahlberg, titled From the 'Hood to Hollywood, A Soldier's Story.

To be more satirical of the Hollywood lifestyle, a fictional approach was chosen rather than a straight documentary in order to keep the content light, and avoid directly depicting Wahlberg's violent past. Vincent Chase was envisioned to be more similar to Wahlberg, but it was decided that some of his and his friends' activities (particularly some elements of their criminal past) would not work well on television. A lighter approach was subsequently decided upon.

== Cast and characters ==
The main characters of Entourage. From left to right: Ari Gold (Jeremy Piven), Eric "E" Murphy (Kevin Connolly), Vincent "Vince" Chase (Adrian Grenier), Turtle (Jerry Ferrara) and Johnny "Drama" Chase (Kevin Dillon).

Entourage revolves around Vincent Chase (Adrian Grenier). His best friend and manager is Eric Murphy (Kevin Connolly). "E", as his friends call him, is based on Mark Wahlberg's friend and associate producer Eric Weinstein. He's also been reported to be inspired by Stephen Levinson, Mark Wahlberg's manager.

Vincent's older half-brother, Johnny "Drama" Chase (Kevin Dillon), is Vince's personal chef, trainer and bodyguard. Drama is a C-list actor who was in the fictional show Viking Quest during his younger days. His role in the new fictional hit show Five Towns had begun to resurrect his fame and career, although he still received less acknowledgment than he would have liked for it. As the show went on, Drama got offers for more and more roles. The show ended with Drama having his own animated TV show called "Johnny's Bananas" and him landing a new TV movie with the help of Vince. Drama's character was inspired by Johnny "Drama" Alves, a longtime friend and associate of Mark Wahlberg whose personality and experiences contributed to the development of the character.

Rounding out the entourage of friends is Salvatore "Turtle" Assante (Jerry Ferrara), who is another of Vince's old friends from childhood. Turtle's official role is as Vince's driver and assistant, though his value as such is often brought into question. This character is based on Wahlberg's former "gofer" Donnie Carroll aka "Donkey". Carroll auditioned for the role, but the Boston native was turned down when it was decided the actors would have to be New Yorkers. Carroll died on December 18, 2005, after an asthma attack.

Ari Gold (Jeremy Piven) is Vince's abrasive but lovable agent. The role has led to several nominations and Emmy Awards for Piven. Ari is based on Wahlberg's real-life agent Ari Emanuel.

Connolly, Grenier, Dillon, Ferrara, and Piven are credited in every episode in the opening credits of the entire series. Debi Mazar, who has a recurring guest star role as Shauna in season 1, is promoted to opening credits billing in season 2. Her appearances in season 3 were limited due to her pregnancy and Mazar made her final regular appearance in episode 42 (season 3 finale). Mazar made appearances in seasons 4 through 8 and is credited as a special guest star. Perrey Reeves (as Ari's wife Melissa) and Rex Lee (as Ari's assistant Lloyd) have recurring roles in the first two seasons. Starting in season 3, Reeves and Lee are credited as "starring" in the end credits in the episodes they appear in. Reeves receives opening credits billing starting with season 4, and Lee is added to the opening credits starting with season 5. In season 4, Rhys Coiro, who portrays recurring character Billy Walsh, is credited as "starring" in the end credits for the first six episodes of the season. However, when his character returns in episode 52 (season 4, episode 10), he is again credited as a guest star; he returns in season 7 as a recurring special guest star and is credited as "starring" in the end credits again in season 8. Emmanuelle Chriqui portrays E's on-and-off girlfriend Sloan McQuewick as a recurring guest star from season 2 to 5, and beginning with season 6, she is credited as "starring" in the end credits. Gary Cole guest stars in three episodes of season 5 as agent Andrew Klein, and beginning with season 6 he is credited as "starring" in the end credits and returns in season 7 as a special guest star. Scott Caan guest stars in two episodes of season 6 as Scott Lavin, and in season 7 and 8, he is credited as "starring" in the end credits.

=== Recurring characters ===
Entourage features many recurring characters. Some are fictional, such as Malcolm McDowell's "Terrance McQuewick" character, while other actors, such as Mark Wahlberg, Bob Saget, Pauly Shore, Jamie-Lynn Sigler, Mandy Moore, Sasha Grey, and Seth Green appear as fictional versions of themselves.

=== Guests and cameos ===
Entourage typically has at least one celebrity guest per episode, such as actors, film directors, film producers, musicians and professional athletes playing themselves. Appearances include Peter Jackson, Christina Aguilera, Kanye West, Curtis Jackson, Tom Brady, Jessica Alba, Gary Busey, Larry David, Scarlett Johansson, James Cameron, Dennis Hopper, Martin Scorsese, Matt Damon, Eminem, LeBron James, Mark Cuban, John Cleese, Phil Mickelson, and many others.

== Episodes ==
Season	Episodes		Originally released	
Season	Episodes		First released	Last released
1	8		July 18, 2004	September 12, 2004
2	14		June 5, 2005	September 4, 2005
3	20	12	June 11, 2006	August 27, 2006
3	20	8	April 8, 2007	June 3, 2007
4	12		June 17, 2007	September 2, 2007
5	12		September 7, 2008	November 23, 2008
6	12		July 12, 2009	October 4, 2009
7	10		June 27, 2010	September 12, 2010
8	8		July 24, 2011	September 11, 2011
Film			June 3, 2015	

=== First season ===
The first season chronicles Vincent Chase's adventures as he climbs the celebrity ladder after his first successful film: Head On. At the forefront of the first few episodes is the conflict between Vince's best friend "E" and his agent Ari, who are both working to get the best for Vince, but often differ on how to accomplish this.

Vince's next project is decided halfway through the season: Queens Boulevard. Signed on is indie director Billy Walsh (Rhys Coiro), who comes into immediate conflict with E. Eventually their differences are put aside and the season ends with the crew leaving for New York to start production on Queens Boulevard, with E having become Vince's official manager (with salary).

Running subplots include: Turtle's laziness and quest for marijuana; Drama's struggle to follow in his younger brother's footsteps; E dating Ari's assistant Emily (Samaire Armstrong); and Vince's many and varied girlfriends.

=== Second season ===
The second season focuses on Vince's proposed role in the film adaptation of Aquaman as the eponymous hero. Ari's inability to close the contract leads to trouble, but Vince manages to convince the film's director, James Cameron, that he is right for the part. However, new problems arise when the role of the leading lady goes to Mandy Moore, Vince's ex-girlfriend, for whom he still has feelings, but who is engaged to be married. Mandy and Vince resume their romance after Mandy's engagement shows signs of problems, but she eventually returns to her boyfriend. Initially devastated, Vince finds the will to go on with the film in the end.

However, Ari has his own problems in the form of his boss and partner, Terrance McQuewick (Malcolm McDowell), who is trying to steal Vince away from him. Near the end of the season, their conflict reaches a head and Ari is fired from the agency after another agent, Adam Davies, leaked information suggesting that Ari may be plotting against Terrance. E, meanwhile, begins dating Sloan (Emmanuelle Chriqui), McQuewick's daughter.

Meanwhile, Drama continues to try to become a star, even considering getting his calves augmented. He is eventually dropped by his agent, Adam Davies, after Vince decides to stick with Ari after Ari is fired. Turtle starts a career of his own, as manager of rapper Saigon.

=== Third season, part 1 ===
The third season continues with the Aquaman plotline as the film premieres and becomes a huge hit, attaining the highest-grossing opening weekend in movie history. Problems arise, however, when Medellin, Vince's dream project about the life of Pablo Escobar, conflicts with the schedule of Aquaman 2. The end result is that Vince is unable to star in either and is fired by Warner Bros.

E's relationship with Sloan comes into question when he has a threesome with her and her friend Tori (Malin Åkerman), to whom E is attracted. Tensions rise further when E is confronted by Sloan's stalker Seth Green. Seth claims that he had been with Sloan a few years back however, Sloan assures E that he was creepy and they never so much as kissed.

Near the end of the season, Drama finally lands his big break as he's signed on to the new TV series Five Towns. Turtle's career as a music manager ends unceremoniously when he is forcefully bought out by Saigon's original manager. Ari meanwhile has to juggle his new, initially failing, business with keeping Vince happy. Even though Ari manages to set up a successful new agency with the help of Barbara Miller (Beverly D'Angelo), it leads him to neglect his star client. After Ari introduces E to washed up producer Bob Ryan (Martin Landau), E discovers in Ryan's home a biographical script about punk band The Ramones, with Vince having the opportunity to play Joey Ramone. However, in the season finale, Ari is fired as Vince's agent after his abrasive methods and constant mocking of Ryan result in failure to secure the film.

=== Third season, part 2 ===
The second part of the third season focuses almost entirely on Vince and Ari and the troubles surrounding Medellin. Attempting to get Vince back, Ari convinces him that he can secure the film after all. Vince's new agent, Amanda Daniels (Carla Gugino), tries to steer Vince towards a different film, but he ends up refusing. To compound their problems, Vince and Amanda both admit to a mutual attraction, and have a relationship. When Medellin once again slips from Vince's grasp, he questions Amanda's motives. After proving her innocence, she drops him as both client and boyfriend. With the help of Ari, who is once again hired, Vince and E finally secure their dream project when they buy the rights to the film Medellin themselves. Billy Walsh is signed on as the director with E given his first shot at producer.

In the continuation of the previous part's subplot, Drama's star rises, and Five Towns becomes a hit. E moves in with Sloan.

=== Fourth season ===
The fourth season continues the Medellin plotline as production of the film finally begins. Conflicts quickly arise when E admits to being dissatisfied with the first cut after Walsh reluctantly agrees to a midnight screening. Vince and E subsequently clash over the creative direction and financing of the film in an arc which escalates through the season. There is much contention over the ending of the script, and Stephen Gaghan is brought in briefly, at which point Walsh comes up with what he believes to be a good ending.

When the Medellin trailer leaks to the public via YouTube, an opportunity is presented to leverage the resultant hype to broker a deal attaching Vince to a new big-budget project. The deal, however, is unexpectedly sold on the strength of not just Vince, but the "Medellin Dream Team" — also involving E as producer and Walsh as director — at the point when animosity between E and Walsh begins to come to a head. Consequently, E must decide between jeopardizing the deal and the prospect of working on another project with Walsh, which he had previously sworn he would never do again.

Meanwhile, Ari contends with various complications in his personal and professional lives, including the incapacitating relationship troubles of his indispensable assistant, Lloyd, the uncertainty of his son's acceptance into the exclusive private school that his daughter attends, and interpersonal conflicts among employees of his agency.

E navigates unfamiliar waters as he clumsily attempts to expand the representation of his fledgling management agency beyond Vince, his only client at the time. By chance he comes to meet and subsequently represent Anna Faris, but when his loyalty to Vince and his personal feelings for Faris are set at odds with each other and compromise his professional judgment, he is ultimately fired by Faris.

Drama and Turtle are featured throughout the season in various subplots that see them engaging in the type of antics typical of their characters, such as procuring marijuana and engaging in furry fetishes via Craigslist on a bet.

In the season finale, the entourage travels to the Cannes Film Festival to promote Medellin, and sign a distribution deal. However, the film bombs with the Cannes audience, and they are forced to accept an offer from producer Harvey Weingard (Maury Chaykin) of a mere one dollar for the film.

=== Fifth season ===
Vince returns to Los Angeles ready to work after spending months relaxing in Mexico with Turtle. Medellin has gone straight-to-DVD and made numerous worst-of-the-year lists, with Vince's performance also being heavily criticized. Eric receives a script from a pair of unknown screenwriters trying to get a break in Hollywood called Nine Brave Souls, in which Eric sees potential. Eric gets Edward Norton and Amanda Daniels (Carla Gugino) interested, and they change the name of the film to Smoke Jumpers. When Ari reads the script of Smoke Jumpers he convinces Eric to start a bidding war for the film with Vince attached. Amanda refuses to participate and passes on it until later reconsidering and making an offer. However, Alan Gray (Paul Ben-Victor), head of the Warner Brothers Studio and the man who fired Vince from the sequel to Aquaman, outbids them.

Ari, determined to get Vince the role he desires, challenges Alan to a round of golf for the part. When Alan beats Ari, they get into a heated argument, causing Alan to drop dead of a heart attack. At Alan's funeral, Ari takes the opportunity to ask John Ellis (Alan Dale), Alan's boss, about giving the role to Vince. Ellis instead offers him Alan's position as president of the studio, with Amanda as the number-two choice for the job. Rather than accepting the offer and abandoning his clients, Ari instead gets Dana Gordon (Constance Zimmer) the job, therefore locking up Smoke Jumpers for Vince.

Meanwhile, Drama is continuing production of Five Towns while maintaining a long-distance relationship with his French girlfriend, Jacqueline. Drama's nervousness about Jacqueline possibly cheating on him leads to their break-up and his breakdown during a guest appearance on The View. Turtle meets Jamie-Lynn Sigler on an airplane and the two hit it off, but their potential relationship is ruined when Turtle tells the guys she gave him a handjob. She eventually forgives him and is interested in a relationship. Also, Ari signs his old colleague Andrew Klein (Gary Cole) as a new partner in MGA.

Smoke Jumpers begins filming, but after several conflicts between Vince and director Verner Vollstedt (Stellan Skarsgård), which leads to Verner firing Vince, production is halted by Ellis. The boys return to New York City, where Vince pursues a role in Gus Van Sant's new film. Eric persistently tries to convince Van Sant that Vince is right for the film, but Van Sant says not for his current film, but would love to work with him in the future. After discovering Van Sant said no, Vince becomes upset and fires Eric, believing that Eric had made him look desperate. A frustrated E returns to Hollywood to concentrate on another client, a young and rising comedian named Charlie (Bow Wow). Vince later apologizes after learning that Eric's persistence led to an offer by Martin Scorsese for a lead in his next feature, a re-envisioning of The Great Gatsby set on the Upper West Side of Manhattan. The guys return to Hollywood.

=== Sixth season ===
The sixth season is mostly divided into individual storylines. Vince, back to A-list status after Gatsby, is preparing for his next role, starring in an Enzo Ferrari biopic (to be directed by Frank Darabont). Left to his own devices by his friends, Vince spends much of the season relaxing.

Meanwhile, Eric, prompted by ex-girlfriend Sloan, moves out on his own. Midway through the season, he disbands his company, shutting it down for good, and goes to work for veteran manager Murray Berenson (George Segal) while also incurring the wrath of colleague Scott Lavin (Scott Caan) who deeply resents Eric's involvement in the company. While he starts a relationship with his neighbor Ashley (Alexis Dziena), Eric still pines for Sloan, and tries to win her back.

Turtle, who dreams of starting his own business, starts college. He is still together with Jamie-Lynn Sigler and is quickly becoming a celebrity in his own right. While at college, he meets Brooke, who attempts to seduce him. He turns her down. When Jamie-Lynn is offered a role, to be filmed in New Zealand, she breaks up with Turtle.

Jamie-Lynn also factors into Drama's storyline, as she guest-stars on his show Five Towns. When the head of production, Dan Coakley (Matt Letscher), jokes to Drama about wanting to have sex with Sigler, Drama attacks him. Coakley then takes it on himself to ruin Drama's character on the show. Finally, Drama leaves Five Towns with some help from Ari, and after a successful audition, receives an offer to star in his own television show pending studio approval.

Ari also faces trouble at work. Lloyd, his assistant, demands a promotion to agent and Ari makes him undergo a series of demeaning tests. As a result, Lloyd quits. Meanwhile, Andrew Klein, whose standing with Barbara Miller (Ari's partner) is precarious, cheats on his wife. His marital problems interfere with his work and only Ari's intervention saves him from being fired. Klein redeems himself by signing writer Aaron Sorkin.

In the final episodes of the season, Ari is approached by his old boss, Terrance McQuewick, who wants him to buy out his agency. Despite bitterness from being fired over his agency revolt years before, Ari finally agrees to the buyout and reconciles with Terrance. Ari goes out firing employees who might not fit in after his takeover, with Adam Davies also getting the boot. He is now on the road to becoming the most powerful agent in Hollywood. Ari finally promotes Lloyd to agent.

The season ends with Vince and Drama traveling to Rome, to start shooting the Ferrari film. Turtle is to meet them there, having traveled all the way from Auckland. Only E stays behind, having successfully proposed marriage to Sloan.

=== Seventh season ===
As Vince shoots an action film called The Takeover directed by Nick Cassavetes, Vince performs a dangerous driving stunt, despite Eric and Ari's disapproval. As a result, he crashes the car into the set, but emerges feeling emboldened and invincible. The incident also pushes Vince to seek out new thrills, including impulsively adopting a shorter haircut, sky-diving, purchasing a Harley-Davidson, popping Vicodin pills, and striking up a relationship with pornographic star Sasha Grey. Vince is introduced to a new project, Air-Walker, by Eric's associate Scott Lavin (Scott Caan), creating a hostile relationship with Eric; they eventually bury the hatchet and temporarily work together to help further Vince's career. This friendship eventually ends once Eric realizes Scott possibly supplied Vince with cocaine at a party.

Now running a fledgling car service business, Turtle is frustrated when an employee named Alex (Dania Ramirez) causes problems for him; however, she quits after an inappropriate advance he makes towards her. Turtle's business eventually fails, but after reconciling with Alex, she introduces him to some friends in Mexico, who wish to make Vince the face of their tequila company, Avión. Turtle agrees and begins promoting the product. The promotions create a huge demand for it in Southern California, which cannot be met by the company's production unless a new factory is built. Looking for potential investors, Turtle pitches the company to Dallas Mavericks owner Mark Cuban and his business partner Ken Austin (Bob Odenkirk), and after a meeting with one of Avion's owners, Carlos, Cuban gives him the $5 million needed.

Meanwhile, Lizzie Grant (Autumn Reeser), the promising young agent who had a turbulent affair with Andrew Klein, quits after Ari refuses to promote her to the head of the TV department of the agency (Klein's former position) despite her stellar performance. Lizzie attempts to steal some of Ari's clients, prompting Ari to take action. Ari learns that Lizzie had gone to Amanda Daniels to try to bring down Ari; however, this alliance is short-lived, as Lizzie decides she wants no part in Amanda's revenge plots. An anonymous person sends tapes to Deadline Hollywood, revealing Ari's foul-mouthed rants. Ari, who was nearing a deal with Jerry Jones to bring an NFL team to Los Angeles, suddenly finds his life in a tailspin. This incident leads Ari's wife to "seriously re-evaluate their marriage", causing Ari to spend more time with his family and attempting a friendlier work environment. His newfound peace is broken when he confronts Amanda at an upper-class restaurant, accusing her of sending the tapes and stealing his NFL team. She reveals that her ex-assistant sent the tapes and that the NFL was reconsidering Ari for their team (with the help of Amanda). She has now lost complete respect for Ari, and the outburst leaves Ari looking foolish in front of many Hollywood executives. Ari's relationship with his wife ends on the fence as well as she tells him she wants a break from him.

During this, Scott wants to reconcile with Eric and offers him an opportunity to supplant Murray Berenson at the management company, having already convinced everyone else in the office to go along. Eric refuses as he gets along with Murray because he is Sloan's godfather. However, Terrence McQuewick asks Eric to sign a pre-nuptial agreement with Sloan as both he and Murray feel that Eric may just rely on Sloan's family money. This causes him to take Scott up on his offer.

Drama wants a job since his holding deal will expire in eight weeks. He finds out new shows are being made by the network, but not for him. Lloyd finds an Emmy Award-winning writer (Jeff Garlin) to write something for Drama, though Drama is disappointed that he hasn't written anything since 1991 and that the proposed show would be a comedy. The script turns out to be a good fit for Drama and John Stamos is suggested as a co-star; however, Bob Saget is given Drama's role instead due to his friendship with Stamos. Billy Walsh makes a return after starting a family and becoming an ordained minister. Looking for work so that he can provide for his family, he looks to create a new show for Drama. The show, a cartoon called Johnny's Bananas, is conceptually a hit with the network but it takes a while (and persuasion from Eric's assistant) for Drama to get on board. After accepting the offer, Drama, Turtle, Alex, Billy and Lloyd celebrate back at Vince's house, where Lloyd discovers a large bag of cocaine belonging to Vince.

Vince's drug problems continue to grow, as Air-Walker director Randall Wallace becomes suspicious of Vince's behavior. Randall quits when Vince refuses to take a drug test and is replaced with Peter Berg. When Vince discovers that Sasha is seriously considering a role in an upcoming porn film, he tries to land her a role in Air-Walker instead. He succeeds, but Sasha sees this as a way for Vince to control her life, as evidenced by Vince's reckless behavior on the set of Sasha's new movie. As a result, Sasha ends their relationship. The guys attempt to stage an intervention for Vince, who refuses to listen to them and decides to spend the night at a hotel. During Eminem's party at the hotel, Vince starts a fight with him, and gets beaten up by him and his security. Vince gets taken to the hospital where the police find a bag of cocaine that was in his sweater.

=== Eighth season ===
Vince is sober after spending three months in rehab and returns home ready to work. He pitches a film idea to his friends about miners, but is not well received among his "entourage". Eric and Sloan have broken up, mainly because Eric refused to sign a prenuptial agreement and took over Murray Berenson's agency with Scott's help while both Eric and Scott later work together, creating the "Murphy Lavin Group". Johnny's new show, Johnny's Bananas, is a potential hit in the making. Still separated, but wanting to get back together, Ari learns his wife is seeing chef Bobby Flay. Hurt, Ari begins seeing Dana Gordon. Turtle burns down part of the house when he accidentally throws out his joint onto the drapes, forcing the group to move into a hotel.

Vince writes a script for the miner movie and receives several tips from Billy Walsh, most notably that the movie would be better served with Drama as the lead, rather than Vince himself. Eric and Sloan have one last "fling" before she tells him that she is moving to New York. Ari makes Lloyd the head of the TV department. Avión owner Carlos reluctantly pushes Turtle to retire, and reveals to him that Alex has left him for someone else. Turtle presents an idea to Vince to start a new company after he sells his stock from Avión. Johnny begins recording Johnny's Bananas and finds out that the show will be getting its first test screening; co-star Andrew Dice Clay signs with Scott Lavin. Dice pushes Johnny and E to ask the network for more money, they turn him down. Staying true to his word, Dice leaves the show before it airs. Johnny is not happy with his replacement.

Vince meets with producer Carl Ertz (Kim Coates) at his house. Ertz offers to produce his TV movie for Johnny, but in return wants Vince to star in the film Taxman. After realizing his mistake and feeling bad, Ertz runs off to the bathroom to get high and subsequently shoots himself in the head. After the shooting, Vince is required to take a drug test by his parole officer as there was cocaine in Ertz's house. Worried he will fail the test, as he smoked a joint earlier in the week, he ends up using a device to pass the drug test against E's approval.

Ari continues his fling with former flame Dana Gordon. After a bad session of couples therapy, Ari takes Dana out to Bobby Flay's restaurant to get back at his wife. Dana learns of Ari's real motives and storms out. Melissa then accuses Ari of cheating on her with Dana while they were still together, which Ari immediately denies.

Vince has an interview with Vanity Fair writer Sophia Lear (Alice Eve). He opens up to Sophia and tells his story only for the article to call him an "insecure womanizer". Ari's personal and professional lives collide when he realizes that he might lose his share in the company after his divorce is finalized. Eric takes a meeting with Melinda Clarke and ends up having sex with her instead. He is unnerved when he realizes afterwards that her true intentions were to get back at her ex.

Drama tries to get Andrew Dice Clay back on his show, and instead ends up going on strike alongside him. However, Phil Yagoda (William Fichtner) and CBS agree to pay them more, ending the strike and green-lighting Johnny's Bananas once again. Vince tries to meet with Sophia to change her perception of him, but is instead rejected. Turtle meets with his new business partners, but they're more interested in the "Hollywood glam" than anything else. Things get worse when he realizes that Avión has gone public and that he sold his share too soon.

Vince and Ari realize that Phil is upset with Drama going on strike, so Vince offers him $100,000 in exchange for him forgiving Drama and producing the miner movie with him. In the meantime, Turtle and Drama each speak with Sophia, and try to steer her towards going out with Vince, which she ultimately does. Turtle is sulking over the Avión deal, until Vince tells him that he never sold his share, and bought Turtle's share for him as well. Vince's original investment of $1.1 million is now worth $15 million and Turtle's $300,000 is worth $4 million. Vince, Drama and Turtle toast to redemption. Meanwhile, Eric gets word that Sloan is out with his client Johnny Galecki, so he and Melinda crash their date. Tensions mount and Eric finds out that Sloan is pregnant with his child and that she still intends to move to New York without him.

In the final episode, Vince tells the gang that he's flying to Paris in a few hours to marry Sophia. Eric quits his job and announces that he's moving to New York to try to be a good father for his child. Turtle and Drama try to convince Sloan to forgive Eric and fly to Paris for the wedding. She's on the fence, until Vince seals the deal by giving her a heartfelt speech about Eric. In the meantime, Ari quits his job for his family and reconciles with his wife. In the end, the entourage meets up at the airport where Sloan forgives Eric and together they fly away to a destination of their choice, compliments of Vince. Meanwhile, Vince, Sophia, Drama, Turtle, Ari and Melissa fly to Paris for Vince's wedding while Scott stays behind in Los Angeles, presumably to continue looking after the day-to-day running of the "Murphy Lavin Group" agency.

In the post-credits scene, Ari and Melissa are busy resting on the Amalfi Coast when John Ellis suddenly calls up Ari. John explains to Ari that he wants to retire, and wants him to take his place as chairman and CEO of Time Warner. The final scene shows Ari contemplating the offer.

== Feature film ==
In August 2010, when it was confirmed that Entourage would end after its eighth season, creator Doug Ellin expressed interest in writing a film after the series ended.

In September 2012, it was confirmed that Ellin had completed the script and that it would take place six months after the end of the series. In January 2013, the film was officially green-lit, and it was confirmed that Ellin would direct it and Warner Bros. would distribute. However, by September 2013, amid reports that there had been significant delays in production and contract issues with the film's cast, Ellin stated the film was "less and less likely every day." In October 2013, the cast reached a deal, confirming the film would move forward. Principal photography began on February 19, 2014, and the film stars Kevin Connolly, Adrian Grenier, Kevin Dillon, Jerry Ferrara, Jeremy Piven, Rex Lee, Debi Mazar, Perrey Reeves, Emmanuelle Chriqui, Rhys Coiro, and new characters played by Billy Bob Thornton and Haley Joel Osment. The film was released on June 3, 2015, to critical and commercial disappointment.

== Themes and characteristics ==
=== Male friendship ===
A recurring theme in Entourage is the strength of male camaraderie and its importance over work. Series creator Doug Ellin stated, "Entourage works because it's about male friendship. The Hollywood setting is entertaining but it's really about the relationship between these guys." He later added that, "Ultimately, the show's theme is friendship and family. The characters may have the bling, but they're grounded guys who look out for each other. That's the backbone of the show. If it was just about fantasy lifestyles, it wouldn't be relatable."

This view was supported by Jeremy Piven, who plays the talent agent, Ari: "If it was just a show about wish fulfillment and guys getting (sex) because their best friend was famous, it wouldn't be that interesting."

To strengthen the bond between the actors, only actors with ties to New York were chosen.

=== Hollywood lifestyle ===
Episodes of the show focus, besides the friendship between the four main characters, on their lifestyle in Hollywood. To lend credence to the show's situations and locations, most episodes of Entourage feature at least one celebrity guest star, appearing as themselves.

== Critical reception ==
Entourage received positive reviews from critics during the majority of its run, with many praising Piven's performance as agent Ari Gold and Dillon's performance as Johnny Chase. On Metacritic, the show has scores of 68/100 for season 1, 73/100 for season 3, 70/100 for season 5, 61/100 for season 7, and 62/100 for season 8. The Wall Street Journal commented on the writing, saying it "is almost always smart, sharp and funny." Ken Tucker of Entertainment Weekly, called season 3 "Almost preposterously enjoyable."

In 2009, Tucker remarked regarding the sixth-season premiere, that "the show really isn't that funny anymore". Season 7, while still gaining generally favorable reviews, had a much more mixed reception than the earlier seasons because "it all feels maybe a little too familiar." The eighth and final season of the show was met with mixed reviews from critics, and it holds a 46% rating on Rotten Tomatoes based on 28 reviews with a consensus of, "The familiar faces are always a comfort, but with Entourage's best stories behind it, the series finale feels like a merciful end."

== Awards and nominations ==
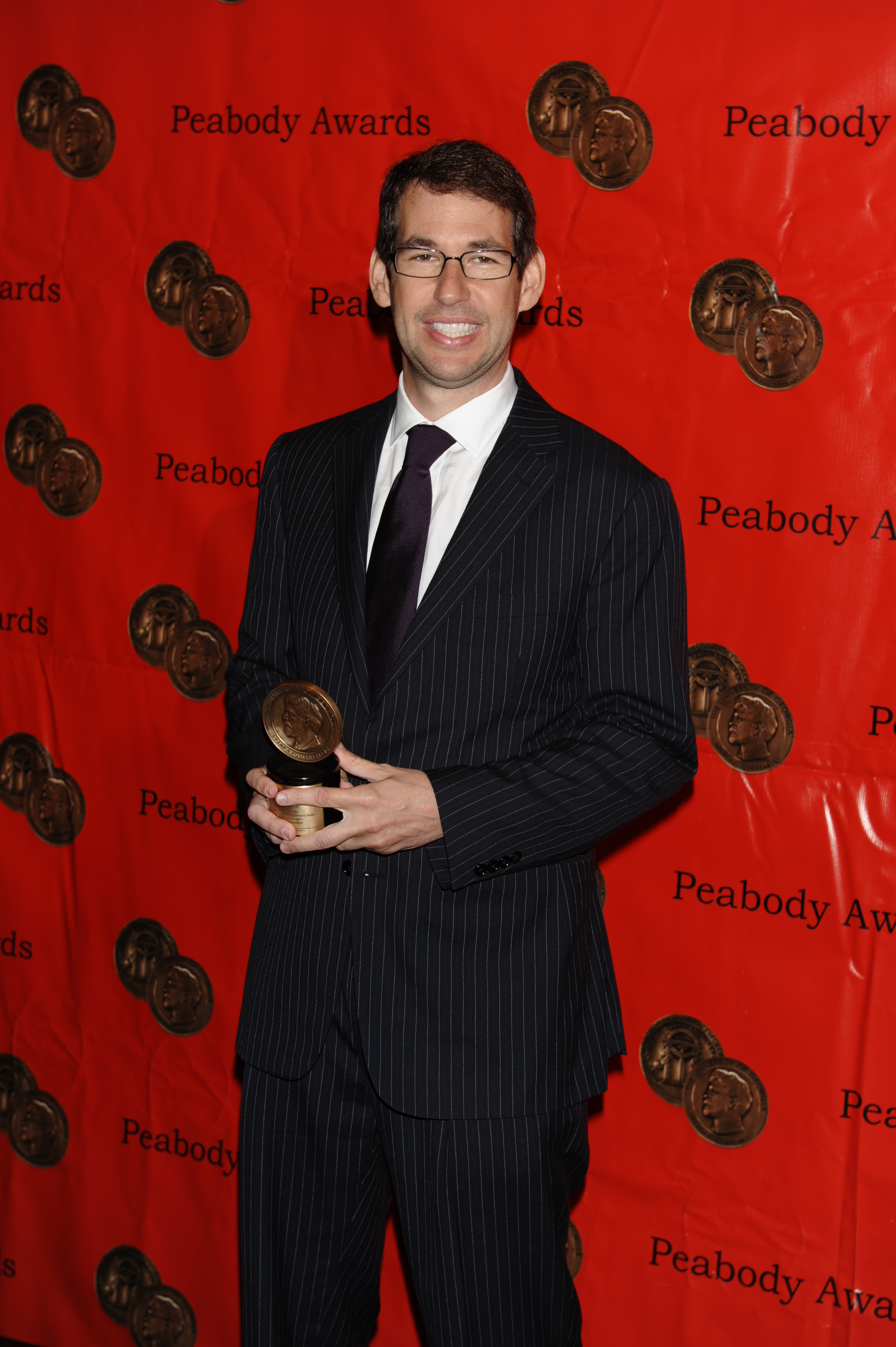
Doug Ellin at the 68th Annual Peabody Awards for Entourage

The series was nominated for 26 Primetime Emmy Awards, with six wins, in categories such as acting, directing, writing and for Outstanding Comedy Series. Jeremy Piven was nominated four consecutive times for Outstanding Supporting Actor in a Comedy Series, winning the award three times in a row in 2006, 2007, and 2008. Kevin Dillon received three consecutive nominations in 2007, 2008, and 2009, for Outstanding Supporting Actor in a Comedy Series. The series was nominated in 2007, 2008, and 2009 for Outstanding Comedy Series. It also received six directing nominations and one writing nomination.

It was nominated for 14 Golden Globe Awards, with Piven and the series being nominated every year. Piven won the Supporting Actor award in 2008. Dillon received a nomination in the Supporting Actor category alongside Piven in 2008, while Kevin Connolly was nominated alongside Piven in 2009.

It was nominated for six Screen Actors Guild Awards–Piven independently and the ensemble cast, four Directors Guild of America Awards, four Producers Guild of America Awards–winning in 2006, and four Writers Guild of America Awards. It also won a Peabody Award in 2008 "for its picaresque and pointed take on Tinsel Town."

== Home media ==
All eight seasons have been released on DVD; with the third season being released in two parts. The sixth, seventh, and eighth seasons have also been released on Blu-ray Disc. A complete series collection, containing all the seasons, and special features from the individual season releases, was released on both DVD and Blu-ray on November 6, 2012.

Season	Release dates			Episodes	Bonus features
Season	Region 1	Region 2	Region 4	Episodes	Bonus features
1	May 10, 2005	October 30, 2006	September 6, 2006	8	Commentary by creator Doug Ellin and executive producer Larry Charles on "Entourage (Pilot)", "Busey and the Beach" and "New York"; Behind-the-scenes interviews with cast and crew
2	June 6, 2006	February 26, 2007	September 6, 2006	14	The Mark Wahlberg Sessions – Wahlberg talks to the cast and crew about the series
3: Part 1	April 3, 2007	November 26, 2007	March 7, 2007	12	Commentary by creator Doug Ellin and actors Kevin Dillon and Jerry Ferrara on "One Day in the Valley", "Vegas Baby, Vegas" and "Sorry, Ari"; "Vegas Baby, Vegas" featurette – behind-the-scenes with cast and crew on location in Vegas
3: Part 2	October 2, 2007	April 7, 2008	November 6, 2007	8	Commentary by creator Doug Ellin, and actors Kevin Connolly, Kevin Dillon and Jerry Ferrara on "Manic Monday", "The Resurrection" and "Adios Amigos"; Museum of Television & Radio Panel Discussion with the Cast; Behind-the-Scenes look at the Season Finale
4	August 26, 2008	October 6, 2008	November 5, 2008	12	Commentary by creator Doug Ellin, and actors Adrian Grenier, Kevin Connolly, Kevin Dillon and Jerry Ferrara on "Welcome to the Jungle", "The Day Fuckers" and "The Cannes Kids"; Meet the Newest Member of Entourage! – a short featurette on Doug Ellin's son, Lucas (who plays Ari's son); The Making of Medellin; Medellin Trailer; U.S. Comedy Arts Festival Panel with the cast and crew
5	June 30, 2009	September 14, 2009	September 1, 2009	12	Commentary by creator Doug Ellin, producer Ally Musika, and actors Adrian Grenier, Kevin Connolly and Jerry Ferrara on "Tree Trippers", "Play'n with Fire" and "Return to Queens Blvd."; The Celebrity Factor – behind-the-scenes interviews with cast and crew
6	June 22, 2010	September 6, 2010	July 20, 2010	12	Commentary by creator Doug Ellin, executive producer Ally Musika, and actors Jeremy Piven, Adrian Grenier, Kevin Connolly, Kevin Dillon, Jerry Ferrara and Bob Saget on "No More Drama", "Scared Straight" and "Give a Little Bit"; "Life at the Top" – A look at the making of Season 6 featuring interviews with cast and crew; "A Day at the Speedway" – Behind-the-scenes with the Entourage cast and crew as they race Ferraris at the Auto Club Speedway; ONEXONE PSA (directed by Matt Damon)
7	July 12, 2011	September 12, 2011	July 13, 2011	10	Commentary by creator Doug Ellin, executive producer Ally Musika, and actors Adrian Grenier, Kevin Connolly, Jerry Ferrara and Jeremy Piven on "Hair", "Porn Scenes from an Italian Restaurant" and "Lose Yourself"; "Inside the Hollywood Highlife" — behind-the-scenes of season seven with interviews with cast and crew; "The Shades of Sasha Grey" – an inside look into the world of adult film star Sasha Grey
8	June 12, 2012	June 11, 2012	June 13, 2012	8	"Hollywood Sunset: Farewell Tribute to Entourage"

== Syndication ==
Entourage is syndicated, often broadcast on HBO, and is also carried in full through HBO Max and HBO's depreciated streaming services; two cuts were created, the original aired by HBO, and a syndicated cut with nudity, sexual content and profanity removed, which is aired in some countries as the default cut to meet local mores.

In the United States, the series was syndicated on local stations and WGN America beginning September 13, 2010, but was only carried for one season, due to low ratings. The series was also syndicated by Spike TV in an attempt to improve their late night ratings. Spike quickly reduced, then ended the contract to carry the series, also due to low ratings; the series often drew lower numbers than much older library or syndicated content, and even the paid programming that followed episodes of the show overnights.

== Promotional material ==
Dillon and Ferrara appeared as their Entourage personalities in a set of commercials for the video game Need for Speed: Hot Pursuit. In the commercials, the guys are valets during the day, and racers (Turtle) and interceptors (Drama) at night.

Nike SB collaborated with creator Doug Ellin to commemorate the final season with an Entourage-branded version of their Nike SB shoes, which was featured on the series. However, these shoes are exclusively for the families of the cast and crew.

As a way to promote the Entourage film, a memoir/self-help book titled The Gold Standard: Rules to Rule By written in the style of character Ari Gold was released on May 12, 2015.
