= List of Entourage episodes =

Entourage is an American comedy-drama television series created for HBO by Doug Ellin, who also serves as an executive producer along with Mark Wahlberg, Stephen Levinson, Dennis Biggs, Rob Weiss, and Ally Musika. The series, loosely based on Wahlberg's own experiences in the film industry, follows Vincent "Vince" Chase (Adrian Grenier), a New York-born actor living in Los Angeles as he struggles with the ups and downs of a career in Hollywood. He is aided, and often hindered, by his entourage, which consists of his half-brother and struggling actor Johnny "Drama" Chase (Kevin Dillon), his childhood friend and manager Eric "E" Murphy (Kevin Connolly), his ruthless agent Ari Gold (Jeremy Piven) and his other long-time friend Turtle (Jerry Ferrara).

Entourage premiered on HBO on July 18, 2004, and aired its final episode on September 11, 2011. A total of 96 episodes were aired over eight seasons. On June 3, 2015, a feature-length film of the same name was released by Warner Bros. Pictures and continued the narrative following the series finale.

== Series overview ==
Season	Episodes		Originally released	
Season	Episodes		First released	Last released
1	8		July 18, 2004	September 12, 2004
2	14		June 5, 2005	September 4, 2005
3	20	12	June 11, 2006	August 27, 2006
3	20	8	April 8, 2007	June 3, 2007
4	12		June 17, 2007	September 2, 2007
5	12		September 7, 2008	November 23, 2008
6	12		July 12, 2009	October 4, 2009
7	10		June 27, 2010	September 12, 2010
8	8		July 24, 2011	September 11, 2011
Film			June 3, 2015	

== Episodes ==
=== Season 1 (2004) ===
No. overall	No. in season	Title	Directed by	Written by	Original release date	U.S. viewers (millions)
1	1	"Entourage"	David Frankel	Doug Ellin	July 18, 2004	1.89
Basking in the adulation from his latest movie premiere, Hollywood "it" actor Vince Chase joins childhood pals Eric, Drama, and Turtle to debate the pros and cons of attending their tenth high-school reunion back east. Meanwhile, Eric – Vince's de facto manager – incurs the wrath of Vince's agent Ari by advising Vince to pass on a script he hasn't even read. On the domestic-security front, Turtle agrees to test the mettle of the entourage's new guard dog, a Rottweiler named Arnold.
2	2	"The Review"	Julian Farino	Doug Ellin	July 25, 2004	1.80
Ignoring the cautionary portents of a negative review, Vince ramps up his already-excessive spending by leasing a new Rolls-Royce. Ari urges Vince to get a "real" manager, causing a wounded Eric to do some soul-searching. Meanwhile, Drama skips a The Vagina Monologues rehearsal to join Vince and the entourage at a wild party hosted by a sexy actress.
3	3	"Talk Show"	Julian Farino	Larry Charles	August 1, 2004	1.94
After meeting Jimmy Kimmel at a boxing after-party in L.A., Vince agrees to appear on his show – despite a long-standing rift between him and Drama. Eric and Kristen share a long goodbye; Ari puts the full-court press on Sarah Silverman; and Luke Wilson tells Turtle how to score a free home-theater system.
4	4	"Date Night"	Dan Attias	Doug Ellin & Rob Weiss	August 8, 2004	2.15
Vince decides to celebrate opening night of his latest movie, Head On, with a group date – to Eric's chagrin. Drama's pumped-up gal pal Tanya struts her stuff at a bowling alley; Turtle taps into Vince's fan mail for some action; and Vince turns on the charm with pop star Justine Chapin.
5	5	"The Script and the Sherpa"	Adam Bernstein	Doug Ellin & Stephen Levinson	August 15, 2004	1.97
Vince's fling with a "cruelty-free" vegan named Fiona – and her friendship with a laid-back L.A. "sherpa" (Val Kilmer) – brings unexpected karma to the entourage. Eric pushes a promising new script set in Queens; Drama fears the disruptive power of his friends' new relationships; and Turtle barters boots for booty.
6	6	"Busey and the Beach"	Julian Farino	Doug Ellin & Larry Charles	August 22, 2004	1.63
Ari's former assistant Josh, now a competing agent, woos Vince and the boys at a wild Malibu beach party. Drama ponders an alternate career in the food-service industry; Eric puts Emily in a compromising position; and Turtle irritates Gary Busey at an art opening.
7	7	"The Scene"	David Frankel	Rob Weiss	August 29, 2004	N/A
Eric is concerned over the choice of director – an indie loose cannon named Billy Walsh (Rhys Coiro) – for Vince's new film. Meanwhile, Drama lobbies for a supporting role, while Ari finds he can't mix business with pleasure.
8	8	"New York"	Julian Farino	Doug Ellin & Larry Charles	September 12, 2004	1.98
Sick of being known as "Vince's guy," Eric wants a title commensurate with his responsibilities. Drama lands an audition for a guest-starring role on a television pilot which shooting schedules' conflicts with Queens Boulevards. With his latest shoot taking him to New York for three months, Vince prepares to say goodbye to L.A. as well as his many "special" friends, while Turtle plans the party.

=== Season 2 (2005) ===
No. overall	No. in season	Title	Directed by	Written by	Original release date	U.S. viewers (millions)
9	1	"The Boys Are Back in Town"	Julian Farino	Doug Ellin	June 5, 2005	1.59
Ari pushes Vince to make a new film about a comic book, but Vince and Eric have their eyes set on a different script; Turtle takes multi-tasking to a new level; Eric gets a new title; Drama's headshot needs to be updated.
10	2	"My Maserati Does 185"	David Nutter	Doug Ellin & Cliff Dorfman	June 12, 2005	N/A
Vince agrees to a starlet's pet project; Vince and Ari argue about Aquaman at a Lakers game; Turtle misrepresents his position to get a girl; Kristen cancels a date with Eric who is upset for the moment but suddenly improves during an after-hours beach party; Drama develops calf-envy.
11	3	"Aquamansion"	Julian Farino	Rob Weiss	June 19, 2005	N/A
The boys get ready for a pajama party at the Playboy Mansion, and discover that Drama has been "banned for life" by Hugh Hefner. Eric tries to persuade Vince to do the Aquaman film, especially when the actor goes house-hunting in an expensive neighborhood.
12	4	"An Offer Refused"	Leslie Libman	Doug Ellin & Chris Henchy	June 26, 2005	1.46
Financial troubles mount for Vince and his new mansion. To make matters worse, the Aquaman offer isn't yet official and Eric learns that Vince is no longer the frontrunner. Drama wants to have cosmetic surgery to augment his calves.
13	5	"Neighbors"	Dan Attias	Doug Ellin & Chris Henchy	July 3, 2005	N/A
Vince discovers why his gorgeous neighbor Staci has been so friendly. Eric regrets the past when he has to get through yet another gate kept by Emily. Ari tries to blackmail Warner Bros. studio executive and former flame Dana Gordon into getting a meeting with an important director. When Drama and Turtle curb their spending, Vince grows suspicious.
14	6	"Chinatown"	Julian Farino	Brian Burns & Larry Charles	July 10, 2005	1.95
Ari encourages Vince to shoot a lucrative foreign commercial, and Drama wants to get in on the action. Eric struggles to convince Walsh to release an advance print of Queens Blvd. Turtle preps for an Xbox tournament.
15	7	"The Sundance Kids"	Julian Farino	Rob Weiss & Stephen Levinson	July 17, 2005	1.97
Within moments of arriving at Sundance, Eric lands a lunch with a studio big wig and gets an offer for Vince that might be too good to refuse. Ari advises him to play it safe, but Vince wants to roll the dice. Turtle and Drama compete for a girl's attention, but she has different plans that involve both. Drama also tries to land a role in an acclaimed Spanish filmmaker's next movie.
16	8	"Oh, Mandy"	Dan Attias	Doug Ellin	July 24, 2005	2.05
One of the names on the short list to play "Aquagirl" (Mandy Moore) exposes a secret from Vince's past that makes Eric feel slighted. Ari gets bumped from an important list. Drama is arrested for destroying a car with Eric's six-iron after the owner of the car insulted his career. Despite being arrested, Drama is very happy when he learns about a movie of the week he's been cast in.
17	9	"I Love You Too"	Julian Farino	Doug Ellin	July 31, 2005	1.94
Vince makes a splash at Comic-Con with his new co-star to promote the movie, as does Drama who is doing a Viking Quest signing. When neither Eric nor Shauna can appease a bitter journalist, Turtle sends a trio of professionals to the rescue. Ari gives Drama a rockin' birthday gift: tickets to a U2 concert.
18	10	"The Bat Mitzvah"	Julian Farino	Doug Ellin & Rob Weiss	August 7, 2005	2.21
Vince gets up-front about his feelings for Aquagirl, sending everyone into a panic; Ari's partner Terrance resurfaces; Eric splurges on an "investment" suit; and Drama and Turtle have high hopes for Little Miss Ari's Bat mitzvah.
19	11	"Blue Balls Lagoon"	Dan Attias	Brian Burns	August 14, 2005	2.57
Vince receives courting lessons from Terrance and a valuable gift from Ari, Shauna flips over a press leak, and Eric gets attention – and ammo – from Terrance's daughter Sloan. Meanwhile, Drama grows over-excited about a co-star which later comes to backfire on him, and Turtle plays ambassador for Vince.
20	12	"Good Morning, Saigon"	Dan Attias	Stephen Levinson & Rob Weiss	August 21, 2005	2.71
When Vince and his co-star act out of character, Ari and Eric must face a team of angry handlers – and each other. Meanwhile, Drama and Turtle make a musical discovery while retrieving Eric's stolen car, which could change the fortunes of one of them.
21	13	"Exodus"	Julian Farino	Doug Ellin	August 28, 2005	N/A
Vince is blinded by love, and Drama and Turtle use their paparazzi skills on an important spy mission to protect Vince. Eric gets cozy with Sloan. Meanwhile, Ari gets shot down in the war room and fired after trying to steal agents and clients to start his own agency.
22	14	"The Abyss"	Julian Farino	Doug Ellin & Rob Weiss	September 4, 2005	2.14
In the Season 2 finale, Vince's despondent mood forces Eric to consider fending for himself. Meanwhile, Ari has meetings at a coffee shop and Drama and Turtle make a vow of silence. Vince considers making a big decision about the movie. Drama tries to find out why his agent won't call him back. Turtle organizes a musical showcase for his rapper, Saigon.

=== Season 3 (2006–07) ===
No. overall	No. in season	Title	Directed by	Written by	Original release date	U.S. viewers (millions)
Part 1
23	1	"Aquamom"	Julian Farino	Doug Ellin	June 11, 2006	2.70
Vince tries to invite his mother to be with him at the world premiere of Aquaman. Meanwhile, Ari copes with financial difficulties and the limits of his new office space.
24	2	"One Day in the Valley"	Julian Farino	Marc Abrams & Michael Benson	June 18, 2006	2.20
Vince's steamy post-premiere plans for Aquaman leave Drama hot and bothered. A series of California blackouts threatens to undermine Aquaman's chances of eclipsing Spider-Man's opening-weekend numbers. Stuck in the San Fernando Valley after watching the movie, the guys purchase motorcycles and help two geeks get into a high-school party. Ari puts off sex with his wife on "game day", as he refers to the Aquaman opening day.
25	3	"Dominated"	Julian Farino	Rob Weiss	June 25, 2006	N/A
Dom (Domenick Lombardozzi), one of the gang's old friends from New York City, shows up at the house but Turtle and Drama grow uncomfortable of him. Ari attempts to destroy his daughter Sarah's relationship with a child star.
26	4	"Guys and Doll"	Craig Zisk	Doug Ellin & Rob Weiss	July 2, 2006	2.00
To receive an offer for his dream role in the film Medellín, Vince must first entice the producer. A theft of a rare item threatens to jeopardize his chances.
27	5	"Crash and Burn"	Patty Jenkins	Brian Burns	July 9, 2006	N/A
Vince and Ari must negotiate with both Warner Bros. and Medellín director Paul Haggis in order to avoid scheduling conflicts with Aquaman 2. Turtle makes an appointment with Ari after rapper Saigon's single becomes a hit, much to the chagrin of Drama.
28	6	"Three's Company"	Ken Whittingham	Lisa Alden	July 16, 2006	N/A
Vince continues to defy Alan Gray, even as he offers $12.5 million to star in Aquaman 2. He even avoids talking to Ari unless the agent can secure some work for Drama. Sloan invites E to have a threesome with her friend Tori. He initially believes the invitation is a joke, but it turns out to be real.
29	7	"Strange Days"	Mark Mylod	Marc Abrams & Michael Benson	July 23, 2006	N/A
Vince agrees to be auctioned off at a charity benefit chaired by Sloan. Eric finds himself falling for Sloan's friend Tori after their threesome. At long last, Ari and Terrance come to an agreement over his dismissal.
30	8	"The Release"	Patty Jenkins	Doug Ellin & Brian Burns	July 30, 2006	N/A
Vince and E receive news that Queens Boulevard will be receiving a nationwide release - but they, and director Billy Walsh, are not happy with the significant changes proposed by the studio. The heads of all talent agencies in LA confront Ari over his new plans. Drama is nervous about an important audition and begins to take his anger out on everyone.
31	9	"Vegas Baby, Vegas!"	Julian Farino	Doug Ellin	August 6, 2006	2.40
The gang heads to Las Vegas for a vacation and for Vince to make a special promotional appearance for $100,000. Seth Green repeatedly harasses Eric about Sloan. A masseur gets the wrong impression when Drama showers him with compliments.
32	10	"I Wanna Be Sedated"	Julian Farino	Doug Ellin & Lisa Alden	August 13, 2006	N/A
On the day of a record signing for Saigon, Drama and Turtle make an attempt to find him when he fails to arrive. Ari dumps an old-school producer on Eric who may have Vince's next project. Meanwhile, Vince coincidentally runs into a woman at a bookstore and learns he was on her celebrity "list".
33	11	"What About Bob?"	Ken Whittingham	Brian Burns	August 20, 2006	N/A
Eric, Ari, and Bob pitch the Ramones film project to the studios. which causes a power struggle between Ari and Bob. Turtle wants a pair of limited-edition shoes which Vince tries to buy for him. Drama begins filming his pilot.
34	12	"Sorry, Ari"	Julian Farino	Doug Ellin & Rob Weiss	August 27, 2006	2.54
Vince and the guys evaluate new opportunities with the help of Drama's point system. Ari scrambles to save the Ramones project (and himself) from getting the axe.
Part 2
35	13	"Less Than 30"	Julian Farino	Doug Ellin	April 8, 2007	3.77
Vince's birthday seems to signal a promising new year as his hot new agent, Amanda, pushes him to do an Edith Wharton period film. Eric and Vince have lunch with Ari, who suddenly hints that something they wanted to do may be back on the running.
36	14	"Dog Day Afternoon"	Mark Mylod	Doug Ellin & Rob Weiss	April 15, 2007	3.85
Vince and Eric procrastinate over the period movie, rankling Amanda. Meanwhile, Eric plans a romantic weekend with Sloan, but can't seem to tell Vince that they want to go solo. Turtle and Drama find a pair of dream dates at the hottest singles spot in L.A. – the dog park – but their dog soon puts the kibosh on their romantic plans. Meanwhile, Ari orders Lloyd to "take one for the team" to help land a top TV writer.
37	15	"Manic Monday"	Julian Farino	Doug Ellin & Marc Abrams & Michael Benson	April 22, 2007	3.63
An angry Amanda makes Vince a new offer. When Ari finds his compassionate side getting in the way of firing an inept employee, he must visit his therapist on the golf course to get his ruthless killer instinct back.
38	16	"Gotcha"	Dan Attias	Doug Ellin & Rob Weiss	April 29, 2007	3.33
Drama finds out he will be the target on Pauly Shore's new Punk'd-like reality show, and thinks he's in on the joke. Eric attempts to smooth out tensions between Vince and Amanda, but they've already been relieved. Meanwhile, Ari's college fraternity brother comes for a visit, and Ari gets jealous of the former slacker's new-found riches and his gorgeous fiancée.
39	17	"Return of the King"	Dan Attias	Brian Burns	May 6, 2007	3.45
Vince gets another chance to star in Medellin if only Ari and producer Nick Rubenstein (Adam Goldberg) can broker the deal between Amanda and the studio by day's end. To complicate matters, the Jewish holiday Yom Kippur prevents Ari and Nick from using the phone until after sundown. Eric suspects that Vince and Amanda's relationship is sabotaging the deal. At the races, Drama saves a former champion horse from the glue factory and finds it a new home.
40	18	"The Resurrection"	David Nutter	Doug Ellin & Ally Musika	May 13, 2007	3.12
Eric and Vince want to keep things going on Medellin but are forced to make an extreme call when someone else wants to buy the script rights. Worried about the Five Towns pilot flopping, Drama tries to insulate himself from the world; a poor Variety review makes him go on a late-night drive to the Grand Canyon. Meanwhile, as Drama's Lincoln Continental is being fixed at an auto-body shop, Turtle meets Kelly, who is every bit like himself, flirting with her under the eyes of her overbearing father. Ari is rehired as Vince's agent.
41	19	"The Prince's Bride"	David Nutter	Rob Weiss	May 20, 2007	3.38
Basking in the success of Five Towns, Drama learns about an offer to appear Rush Hour 3, but gets an unexpected response from director Brett Ratner and tries to convince him. A rich man and his gorgeous wife offer to finance Medellin; however, the gang gets mixed signals. Turtle finally dates Kelly.
42	20	"Adios Amigos"	Mark Mylod	Doug Ellin	June 3, 2007	3.36
Vince recruits Billy Walsh to direct Medellin after Nick Rubenstein agrees to finance the project. Meanwhile, the boys have to move out of the mansion, which leads to Drama getting his own condo and Eric moving in with Sloan.

=== Season 4 (2007) ===
No. overall	No. in season	Title	Directed by	Written by	Original release date	U.S. viewers (millions)
43	1	"Welcome to the Jungle"	Mark Mylod	Doug Ellin	June 17, 2007	2.24
A behind-the-scenes documentary about the filming of Medellin in Bogota, Colombia. On the set, Eric and Billy clash over keeping the film on schedule and Billy develops an infatuation with a beautiful Colombian actress (Sofía Vergara) that becomes increasingly disruptive to the production. Meanwhile, Drama tries to angle for a part in the film, and Ari provides color commentary from his LA office.
44	2	"The First Cut Is the Deepest"	Mark Mylod	Doug Ellin	June 24, 2007	2.27
Drama plans a welcome-back party for Vince at his new condo, but his obsession with keeping the place pristine puts a damper on the festivities. Ari and Melissa learn that their son may not get into their daughter's exclusive private school. Billy's insecurities prevent Eric and Vince from seeing the first cut of Medellin.
45	3	"Malibooty"	Ken Whittingham	Rob Weiss	July 1, 2007	2.55
Billy submits Medellin to Cannes Film Festival but Eric thinks it still needs major editing. Vince gets in over his head while hanging at a Malibu beach house. Drama rekindles a romance with a '90s party girl, and brings Turtle along as his wingman.
46	4	"Sorry, Harvey"	Ken Whittingham	Doug Ellin	July 8, 2007	2.21
Eric meets with Harvey Weingard to inform him that Medellin is off the table. Vince and Drama take the mayor of Beverly Hills out for a night on the town, only to have his night exposed on TMZ.com. Ari mishandles a script and spends a night in jail.
47	5	"The Dream Team"	Seith Mann	Brian Burns	July 15, 2007	2.63
When the Medellin trailer is leaked to YouTube, an enraged Billy blames Eric thinking that he's trying to ruin the film. In an effort to appear younger, Drama gets a prescription for a medical-marijuana facility, so he can buy the club's stylish cap. Ari and Lloyd engage in sabotage against a former assistant of Ari's who is now a rival agent so that Vince can get his next project.
48	6	"The WeHo Ho"	Mark Mylod	Doug Ellin	July 22, 2007	2.51
Even after Billy apologizes to him, Eric refuses to work with him again. Lloyd takes a leave of absence when his boyfriend dumps him, so Ari jumps through hoops to get them back together. Turtle goes in on his cousin Ronnie's latest shady investment opportunity.
49	7	"The Day Fuckers"	Mark Mylod	Rob Weiss	July 29, 2007	2.50
Vince and Johnny "Drama" bet with each other on Turtle and Eric's romance prospects. After being rejected from their daughter's exclusive private school, Ari and his wife are upset over their son having to attend a public school and try to change the headmaster's mind for a second time.
50	8	"Gary's Desk"	Julian Farino	Ally Musika	August 5, 2007	2.61
Eric gets an office on a shoddy stretch of Hollywood Blvd., and in trying to announce himself as Vince's manager, finds himself hitting road blocks. Vince, Drama and Turtle scope out an antique desk with a rich Hollywood history, but learn it's already been sold to Gary Busey an actor with whom they have their own colorful past. Ari preps for his annual meeting with R&B super-diva Mary J. Blige, but twin-sibling rivalry in the office screws everything up..
51	9	"The Young and the Stoned"	Mark Mylod	Dusty Kay	August 12, 2007	2.86
Eric gets in a car accident with Anna Faris and while he believes they shared "a little moment," he finds his career about to change. Turtle goes shopping for provisions (and girls) for a party, but has an encounter with the law. Mrs. Ari is asked to reprise her role on a The Young and the Restless anniversary special, leading Ari to try and dissuade her – and her young co-star – with no success.
52	10	"Snow Job"	Ken Whittingham	Doug Ellin & Ally Musika	August 19, 2007	2.77
Vince, Ari, and Dana receive Billy's script for Vince's next project. Even though Billy's interpretation is vastly different from the adaptation he was commissioned to write, Vince sees potential in the movie, so Ari attempts to keep the film alive, but he'll have to do so without Eric's help, since he's busy managing domestic issues between his new client, Anna Faris and her needy boyfriend.
53	11	"No Cannes Do"	Dan Attias	Doug Ellin & Rob Weiss	August 26, 2007	3.06
A code red at LAX threatens the guys' chances of getting to Cannes in time for the Medellin premiere, so Ari attempts to get himself and the others to Cannes by other means, while at the same time trying to placate Mrs. Ari and Lloyd, who both make it clear in their own way that they want to accompany him on the trip. Billy finds room in his script for Eric's new client, Anna Faris, but Eric's dislike of the script will cause him to lose one of his clients. The boys end up hitching a ride to Cannes from Kanye West.
54	12	"The Cannes Kids"	Mark Mylod	Doug Ellin	September 2, 2007	2.19
At Cannes, the guys party it up and attend to the business of selling Medellin, and find themselves with two offers on the table before it's even screened, and in the end, the film is bought from an unlikely source, at a price much lower than they were hoping for. Meanwhile, Drama benefits from the overseas popularity of Viking Quest.

=== Season 5 (2008) ===
No. overall	No. in season	Title	Directed by	Written by	Original release date	U.S. viewers (millions)
55	1	"Fantasy Island"	Mark Mylod	Doug Ellin	September 7, 2008	1.65
With Medellin being slammed by critics Richard Roeper and Michael Phillips and having been reduced to a direct-to-DVD release, Vince hides out in a Mexican paradise with Turtle. Meanwhile, producer Carl Ertz is willing to give Vince his first movie in six months. Eric, Ari and Drama head out to Mexico to convince him to take the role, and as Vince sits down with Ertz, a phone call by Ari's old rival changes things drastically. Drama turns prima donna during a Five Towns photo shoot, and kindles his "virtual" romance with Jacqueline, his Cannes girlfriend.
56	2	"Unlike a Virgin"	Mark Mylod	Doug Ellin	September 14, 2008	1.65
Eric offers to represent LB (Lukas Haas) and Nick (Giovanni Ribisi), two writers of an indie film script, but can't get them Vince or any help from Ari given their recent bad luck with indie films. An encounter with former flame Justine Chapin (Leighton Meester) leaves Vince even more insecure when she pawns him off at a party, and when Ari gives him the cold, hard truth, Vince finally decides to step it up. Drama's relationship with Jacqueline takes a bad turn.
57	3	"The All Out Fall Out"	Mark Mylod	Rob Weiss	September 21, 2008	1.58
To avoid bankruptcy, Vince takes Shauna's and his accountant's advice by agreeing to make an appearance at a not-so-sweet-sixteen bash for Candace (with parents played by Fran Drescher and Kevin Pollak). Ari and Adam Davies' feud restarts with an impromptu street race, but Davies takes it too far. Still devastated by his breakup, Drama gets drunk on a bottle of Johnnie Walker Blue whisky.
58	4	"Fire Sale"	Seith Mann	Doug Ellin	September 28, 2008	1.56
Ari shows interest in Eric's indie script, imagining it as a big studio production with Vince as the lead, but the novice writers, believing they now have a bidding war on their hands, up their price. Determined to postpone his post-breakup depression, Drama gets pumped for his guest appearance on The View (with Whoopi Goldberg and Elisabeth Hasselbeck playing themselves). Drama, set up by his Five Towns co-stars, who have supplied the show with photos of Jacqueline, embarrasses himself, much to the frustration of publicist Shauna.
59	5	"Tree Trippers"	Julian Farino	Ally Musika	October 5, 2008	1.53
Vince, debating over whether to take the big studio picture Benji, a children's film for $3 million, goes with the guys and Ari in search of clarity and guidance in the arid expanse of Joshua Tree National Park, with psilocybin mushrooms and their friend Eric Roberts. Lloyd agrees to watch Ari's house while Mrs. Ari and the kids are away, but Lloyd and his boyfriend use Ari's house to throw a party. Ari has a bad reaction to the mushrooms and gets lost at Joshua Tree. But eventually, on the way back, Vince uses his hallucinogenic experience to make another major career choice.
60	6	"ReDOMption"	Seith Mann	Doug Ellin	October 12, 2008	1.61
Ari squares off against Alan Gray in a golf game in an attempt to get a role for Vince, only to have Alan continue to be his usual angry and vindictive self. After causing a televised car chase, Dom asks Vince to bail him out, but only Eric — who still doesn't trust Dom — can afford it. Desperate for a job, Turtle agrees to be Drama's personal assistant.
61	7	"Gotta Look Up to Get Down"	Mark Mylod	Ally Musika & Rob Weiss	October 19, 2008	1.59
Vince gets a taste of the fashion world when he agrees to do a Dolce & Gabbana photo shoot with a supermodel. Ari pays his respects at a funeral, and winds up getting offered the chance to head the movie studio Warner Bros.
62	8	"First Class Jerk"	Ken Whittingham	Doug Ellin & Rob Weiss	October 26, 2008	1.77
After scoring a first class airplane seat next to actress Jamie-Lynn Sigler, Turtle later makes a claim about onboard sex that the guys don't buy. Ari learns that another Vince-hater (Amanda Daniels) will get the job as the studio head of Warner Bros. if he doesn't take it. Ari tries to prevent that while preserving his current job. Josh Weinstein uses Ari's distraction to court Vince with filmmaker Frank Darabont. Ari eventually gets Dana Gordon to take over.
63	9	"Pie"	Mark Mylod	Doug Ellin	November 2, 2008	1.77
On the set of Smokejumpers, Vince winds up getting his lines stolen by co-star Jason Patric, and not only does the director allow it, but Vince is too intimidated by Patric to do anything about it. Ari has lunch with Andrew Klein (Gary Cole), an old friend and mentor who needs his help.
64	10	"Seth Green Day"	Ken Whittingham	Ally Musika	November 9, 2008	1.83
Charlie gets his pilot script picked up, but when the studio wants to cast Seth Green — Eric's nemesis — Eric must cast aside his personal feelings. Vince is upset that Verner, the director of Smokejumpers, continues to drag his character down, but Verner thinks Vince is the one with the problem. Ari and Lloyd give Ari's old friend and mentor Andrew Klein a Hollywood makeover so he can impress agency co-owner Babs (Beverly D'Angelo), but when she is disrespectful, Ari has had enough.
65	11	"Play'n with Fire"	Mark Mylod	Doug Ellin & Rob Weiss	November 16, 2008	2.06
Despite Vince's best efforts to film a pivotal scene for Smokejumpers, Verner — who never wanted Vince in the first place — fires him from the movie, forcing Ari and Dana Gordon to try to bring the uncompromising director in line. After receiving an unexpected call from Jamie-Lynn Sigler, Turtle goes back to Los Angeles to spend the day with her. While he doesn't reveal his encounter to the guys, he does tell her his real name.
66	12	"Return to Queens Blvd."	Mark Mylod	Doug Ellin & Ally Musika	November 23, 2008	2.05
Nearly broke, the guys return to Queens. But thanks to a tip from Vince and Drama's mom, Rita Chase (Mercedes Ruehl), Eric tries to get filmmaker Gus Van Sant to cast Vince in a role. Van Sant won't let Vince audition, leading to a confrontation between Vince and Eric; Vince fires him, and Eric returns to L.A. Later, Vince reconnects with his high-school sweetheart and Drama invests in a neighborhood bar. Turtle continues to try to maintain his relationship with Jamie-Lynn Sigler as a secret, despite the guys' curiosity. Eric's efforts turn out not to be in vain, as Van Sant forwarded Vince's reel to filmmaker Martin Scorsese, who calls Vince to say he wants Vince in the lead role of his remake of The Great Gatsby, which will film in New York City. Vince flies back to L.A. to reconcile with Eric in person.

=== Season 6 (2009) ===
No. overall	No. in season	Title	Directed by	Written by	Original release date	U.S. viewers (millions)
67	1	"Drive"	Mark Mylod	Doug Ellin	July 12, 2009	3.40
After his post-Medellin difficulties, Vince is on the fast track once again, as he prepares for a driving test for his next movie as Enzo Ferrari as well as an appearance with Jay Leno to promote his new movie Gatsby, directed by Martin Scorsese. Meanwhile, Sloan suggests that Eric get his own place but worries about how it will affect his friends. Lloyd threatens to quit if Ari does not promote him, so Ari counters with a proposal of his own.
68	2	"Amongst Friends"	Mark Mylod	Ally Musika	July 19, 2009	2.69
As the Gatsby premiere nears, Eric asks Sloan to accompany him "as friends," only to realize that it's not what he wants. Ari arranges a friend date between Mrs. Ari and Andrew’s wife, and Ari is not pleased when he finds out a secret about Andrew. Meanwhile, Lloyd goes on a crash diet per Ari’s demand. Vince declares that he will be taking Lisa (Gal Gadot), a woman he met the past Friday. Drama realizing he will be the only one of the group without a date to the premiere, secures a date with Kelly, a salesperson as they’re picking up their outfits for the premier. Turtle makes his red-carpet debut with Jamie-Lynn Sigler on his arm.
69	3	"One Car, Two Car, Red Car, Blue Car"	Mark Mylod	Doug Ellin	July 26, 2009	N/A
A disparaging phone call from his mother and two very expensive gifts from Vince and Jamie-Lynn only sour Turtle's mood on his birthday, so he seeks help from Ari, who helps him realize how to get ahead. Meanwhile, Eric learns that Charlie (Bow Wow) did not test well on his pilot, and knowing that The CW is about to fire him, goes somewhere he's never been to stop it from happening.
70	4	"Runnin' on E"	Ken Whittingham	Doug Ellin & Ally Musika	August 2, 2009	3.30
With production on his Enzo Ferrari film delayed for 12 weeks, Vince looks for ways to amuse himself, and Eric is rather bored as well. Andrew claims to have ended his affair with Lizzie, but Ari is not too sure and urges him to think about his family. As Jamie-Lynn takes Turtle out for back-to-school clothes, he gets a request from Drama regarding Five Towns, one that doesn't please him too well.
71	5	"Fore!"	Mark Mylod	Doug Ellin	August 9, 2009	N/A
Vince and Drama team up with Mark Wahlberg and Tom Brady at a charity golf tournament, and Turtle – who's a Giants fan – is ready to tell Brady his negative opinion of him. Ari – who's also in the tournament – is in hot water with his wife and a client (Jeffrey Tambor) of his for refusing to talk about his partner's affair. Eric is surprised by a job opportunity, and even more surprised when he finds out why he got it in the first place.
72	6	"Murphy's Lie"	Julian Farino	Ally Musika	August 16, 2009	2.80
As Turtle begins his first day at college, Eric manages to fix things with Ashley, who then finds out that he hasn't been forthcoming. Jamie-Lynn films her appearance on Five Towns with Drama, who suspects that his boss has other things in mind for her. Ari gets out of the doghouse at home, only to be surprised by an agency visit from Andrew's wife, and Ari is ready to get rid of the problem entirely.
73	7	"No More Drama"	Doug Ellin	Doug Ellin	August 23, 2009	3.18
Eric starts his new job, and immediately clashes with colleague Scott Lavin (Scott Caan) over Bob Saget, who makes a very unusual request which leaves both Scott and Eric at odds with each other. Vince's home is broken into, and Ari and Turtle seem to be more concerned about it than Vince, especially given that the only thing missing is the underwear. Drama tries to make amends with his boss but only succeeds in worsening the situation.
74	8	"The Sorkin Notes"	Mark Mylod	Doug Ellin & Ally Musika	August 30, 2009	N/A
Vince takes his recent break-in seriously, and calls in Ari's security guy, who is rather pricey. Sloan asks Eric to meet her for drinks, but when he gets a phone call from Ashley, he decides once and for all who, and what, he really wants. Screenwriter Aaron Sorkin arrives to sign with the agency, even though Andrew's domestic issues threaten to derail the deal, but the outcome is very surprising.
75	9	"Security Briefs"	Ken Whittingham	Ally Musika	September 13, 2009	2.60
As Drama follows up on a tip about Vince's suspected stalker, Turtle gets some surprising news about the break-in. Ari steals teen heartthrob Zac Efron from Adam Davies, so Davies offers Lloyd a job as an agent, which brings him into conflict with Ari. Ashley grows increasingly suspicious of Eric.
76	10	"Berried Alive"	David Nutter	Doug Ellin	September 20, 2009	1.83
Ari goes to war with Lloyd when Drama wants out of his contract on Five Towns to get a part on the new Melrose 2009 series, but regardless of the outcome, Drama will have to decide who will be his real agent. Ashley asks Eric to let her read his emails so they can have an open and honest relationship, but after talking with Brittany, his new assistant, it becomes clear to Eric that Ashley has major trust issues. Turtle is caught in a pseudo love triangle with Jamie-Lynn and a UCLA co-ed.
77	11	"Scared Straight"	Mark Mylod	Doug Ellin	September 27, 2009	1.87
Two unexpected arrivals have an unexpected effect on Drama during his audition for Melrose 2009. Ari smells a rat when Terrence unexpectedly offers Ari the chance to buy him out. Eric learns some unsavory news from Drama about his latest fling, which sends him to the doctor much to Scott Lavin's glee with the visit prompting Eric to make a choice about his social life. As Jamie-Lynn prepares to leave for New Zealand, Turtle receives a farewell from her that he wasn't expecting.
78	12	"Give a Little Bit"	Mark Mylod	Doug Ellin & Ally Musika	October 4, 2009	2.49
Just before Vince heads to Italy to film his next movie, Matt Damon – along with Bono and LeBron James – strong-arms him to get involved in his charity. Turtle has a hook-up with Brooke, but he cannot get over Jamie-Lynn, so he heads to Auckland, New Zealand to get her back. Drama chooses to give up acting, only to head back in for another Melrose audition. Ari faces two obstacles in buying Terrance's company: convincing his wife that it's not personal, and an addendum to the contract. After a successful marriage proposal, Eric stays behind with Sloan, while Drama and Vince head to Italy.

=== Season 7 (2010) ===
No. overall	No. in season	Title	Directed by	Written by	Original release date	U.S. viewers (millions)
79	1	"Stunted"	Doug Ellin	Doug Ellin	June 27, 2010	2.48
As Vince shoots an action movie directed by Nick Cassavetes, he is asked to perform a dangerous driving stunt that could be fatal. Eric and Ari intervene, but there may be no stopping it. Now running a fledgling car service business, Turtle is frustrated when an employee named Alex (Dania Ramirez) causes problems for him. Drama wants a job since his holding deal will expire in eight weeks, but Lloyd has not been forthcoming about his prospects, and Ari is the one who gives Drama a harsh reality check.
80	2	"Buzzed"	Tucker Gates	Ally Musika	July 11, 2010	2.55
Vince's new attitude – and new look – after his near-death experience causes a public relations crisis for his career. In the midst of a big meeting over the NFL TV rights, Ari attempts to fix the problem. Luckily, agent Lizzie Grant (Autumn Reeser) is there to take some heat off of him, but indirectly lands him in more trouble. Drama continues to panic over finding a job, so Eric offers to go through scripts with him while Eric faces his own problems in the form of colleague, Scott Lavin who tries to persuade Eric that they'd be better working together. Turtle learns that someone charged $10,000 on his corporate credit card and Alex is the main suspect.
81	3	"Dramedy"	Ken Whittingham; Doug Ellin	Doug Ellin	July 18, 2010	2.56
Drama scoffs at the idea of being in a sitcom, but a partial script and some convincing from Eric and Phil start to change his mind. Barbara demands that Ari promote Lizzie, but they are not the only women causing trouble for him. Turtle is nearly out of options when his employees quit on him, but some unexpected help may save him yet. Scott Lavin continues to ingratiate himself with Vince following a wine-auction road trip, rankling Eric in the process.
82	4	"Tequila Sunrise"	Adam Davidson	Doug Ellin	July 25, 2010	2.58
Turtle goes to Mexico with Alex, uncertain of her intentions, but goes along with it since he needs the money. After inviting John Stamos to Vince's house to convince him to be his co-star, Drama makes a first impression that leaves something to be desired. Ari attempts to part ways with Lizzie on good terms, with no success, but a meeting with some of Hollywood's elite to bring the NFL back to LA looks promising. Eric gets even more upset with Scott, only for their conflict to take a turn.
83	5	"Bottoms Up"	Dan Attias	Ally Musika	August 1, 2010	2.85
During a night out, Vince hooks up with porn star Sasha Grey and takes her to a meeting with Stan Lee. Ari tries to woo Jessica Simpson, Aaron Sorkin and Mike Tyson in an attempt to stop Lizzie from stealing his clients, as well as to find out who she's working for. While he has some success, he is shocked to learn who Lizzie's new boss is. Turtle pitches Eric about Vince becoming the face of his new venture. Drama gets angry when he learns that Bob Saget wants his role alongside John Stamos, but Drama is focusing his anger on the wrong person.
84	6	"Hair"	Doug Ellin	Doug Ellin	August 8, 2010	2.56
Much to Eric and Ari's dismay, Vince jeopardizes his career with a risqué online video, a post on his Twitter page, and the news that he's dating a porn star. Turtle gets freaked out during a night with Alex. A changed Billy Walsh asks Eric for help in restarting his career, and while Eric is uncertain about working with Billy, he presents an intriguing idea for Drama, who's been in a funk. Ari finds his NFL deal in jeopardy when he realizes that Lizzie – with Amanda's help – could sue him for wrongful termination, among other things.
85	7	"Tequila and Coke"	David Nutter	Doug Ellin & Ally Musika	August 15, 2010	2.72
Despite having partied very hard the night before, Vince heads into a meeting with director Randall Wallace, who sees what Vince has indulged in recently. When Ari admits the truth to Lizzie concerning his refusal to promote her, the two of them decide to make amends and help each other out, which doesn't go as expected. Turtle winds up in damage control after promising an LA retailer more product than he can deliver. Eric is intrigued at Billy's show idea for Drama, who is – as expected – upset.
86	8	"Sniff Sniff Gang Bang"	David Nutter	Doug Ellin & Ally Musika	August 22, 2010	2.65
Eric learns that the network wants to use Billy's show idea, but Drama still refuses to consider it. Turtle and Alex set out to find sources of funding since their tequila line is in high demand. Sasha gets a high-paying offer for a porn movie, and as Vince tries to talk her out of it, he's asked by Randall Wallace to do a drug test, so Vince, Eric, and Ari all talk with Dana to resolve the issue. Eric later learns that Scott Lavin helped cause the problem, leading to a furious confrontation between the two. After an ill-fated attempt to change his image at TMA, Ari's personal life suffers as well.
87	9	"Porn Scenes from an Italian Restaurant"	Kevin Connolly	Ally Musika	August 29, 2010	2.86
Now that a new director has been attached to his movie, Vince tries to get Sasha a part in it, which leads to a confrontation. Ari learns from Queen Latifah that Amanda may have landed an NFL deal. Eric’s assistant Jennie works on Drama to get him onboard for Billy's new series. Turtle’s attempt to get funding from Mark Cuban causes problems with his Mexican boss. Unfortunately, while they are all at Vince's home, Drama, Turtle, Lloyd, Billy, and Alex discover how far Vince's drug habits have gone.
88	10	"Lose Yourself"	David Nutter	Doug Ellin	September 12, 2010	2.72
Eric gets an offer from Scott, as well as a request from Terrance McQuewick, either of which could have a major impact on his future. Turtle fires on all cylinders to save the tequila business. Despite having Christina Aguilera appear at his wife's surprise party, Ari may be unable to save his marriage. Although they've got their own problems, Eric, Ari, and Turtle join Drama, Scott, and Billy in staging an intervention for Vince, who has damaged his relationship with Sasha. Sadly, when it seems that things could not get worse, Vince goes too far at Eminem's private party.

=== Season 8 (2011) ===
No. overall	No. in season	Title	Directed by	Written by	Original release date	U.S. viewers (millions)
89	1	"Home Sweet Home"	Doug Ellin	Doug Ellin	July 24, 2011	2.49
Having spent ninety days in rehab, Vince is ready to get back to work and even has a new movie idea, but his friends are so desperate to prevent a relapse that they all tell him they love it, when they actually hate it. Johnny makes sure that there is no alcohol or drugs in the house. Billy helps throw the right kind of welcome home party for Vince, and also makes Vince's bad idea into a good one, with Johnny starring in the project instead. Scott and a now-single Eric try to sign clients to their management firm. Ari wants to end his separation with his wife, only to learn that she has moved on.
90	2	"Out with a Bang"	Doug Ellin	Ally Musika	July 31, 2011	2.14
After writing a 20-page outline for his movie idea, Vince asks Billy to give it a once over. Ari finds out that Mrs. Gold may be lowering her standards after a tip from Lloyd. Drama's Johnny's Bananas costar Andrew Dice Clay needs representation, and leaves Drama reeling after getting an idea. Turtle consistently fails to get Alex on the phone. A miscommunication between Eric and Sloan turns into an encounter that Eric will not forget, yet will want to.
91	3	"One Last Shot"	Dan Attias	Wesley Nickerson III & Kenny Neibart	August 7, 2011	2.36
At a Narcotics Anonymous meeting, Vince meets with Carl Ertz (Kim Coates), the same producer who screwed Vince when he was at his lowest point. Against Ari's advice, Vince chooses to give him a chance, but Turtle – who gets good and bad news from his boss – makes almost no effort to hide his contempt for Ertz. Eric, Drama, and Scott attempt to bring Andrew Dice Clay in line. With Lloyd's help, Ari goes on a date, and his night takes a turn down memory lane. The next morning, Vince and Turtle realize Ertz's true intentions, and find themselves in a very bad position.
92	4	"Whiz Kid"	Roger Kumble	Doug Ellin & Jerry Ferrara	August 14, 2011	2.46
Eric, Drama, Ari, Shauna, and Scott all rush to help Vince and Turtle deal with the fallout from Carl Ertz's suicide. Vince begins to freak out when he has to take a drug test, mainly because he took a few puffs of marijuana the previous week, but only to prove something to himself. With Billy's help, he goes with an unconventional tactic to beat the test. Ari takes Dana to Bobby Flay's restaurant to get revenge on his wife after she walks out on a couples therapy session.
93	5	"Motherfucker"	David Nutter	Ally Musika	August 21, 2011	2.53
Vince has an interview with Vanity Fair, with an end result even he wasn't expecting. Ari's personal and professional lives collide, and now faces a truth he's been trying to avoid for months. Taking a meeting with Melinda Clarke forces Eric to admit he's not over Sloan, but Melinda wanted more from Eric than just being his client. Drama tries to get Andrew Dice Clay back on his show, and one of them now agrees with the other's point of view.
94	6	"The Big Bang"	David Nutter	Doug Ellin & Jerry Ferrara	August 28, 2011	2.16
During his Vanity Fair photo shoot, Vince reads the article for his interview, and sets out to right a perceived wrong. Turtle starts to bring his favorite restaurant to Hollywood, and even though he gives the owners a first-class treatment, they have other ideas. Eric gets an expensive gift from Melinda, as well as news about one of his other new clients. Drama faces pressure from Billy, Phil, and Andrew Dice Clay over his going on strike. Ari also faces pressure regarding his divorce, then confronts his wife over the fact that he's never hidden his true nature from her.
95	7	"Second to Last"	Kevin Connolly	Ally Musika	September 4, 2011	1.72
In the midst of helping Vince woo Sophia, Turtle finds himself needing more money from his investors when his business partners eye an expensive property. Vince and Ari learn that Phil – who feels slighted because Drama went on strike – no longer wants Drama in the miner movie, and must step in to change Phil's mind. Ari must give bad news to Dana, and though she is not mad at him, it's a bitter pill to swallow. Eric's vindictive side shows when he and Melinda crash Sloan's date, and then Sloan gives Eric news that she is pregnant.
96	8	"The End"	David Nutter	Doug Ellin	September 11, 2011	2.61
In the series finale, Vince delivers big news after spending a night with Sophia. Ari makes one final attempt to save his marriage, and when it dawns on him what his mistakes were, he quits the agency. Drama and Turtle do their best to get Sloan to reconcile with Eric, as Vince makes an effort of his own with Terrance. In the end, Vince, Sophia, Turtle, Drama, Ari, and Melissa fly off to Paris for Vince's wedding while E and Sloan fly off together. In a final post-credits scene, Ari is in Italy with his wife when he receives a call from John Ellis (Alan Dale), the CEO of Time Warner. He tells Ari he's retiring and that he wants him as his successor. The episode ends with Ari pondering the offer.

== Film (2015) ==
Title	Directed by	Written by	Release date (U.S.)
Entourage	Doug Ellin	Story by : Doug Ellin & Rob Weiss; Screenplay by : Doug Ellin	June 3, 2015
Continuing where the series left off, Vincent Chase, who separated from his wife after nine days of marriage, wants to do something new in his career. He decides he will only accept his next project if he can also direct.
