= Dramedy (Entourage) =

- Entourage episode
- Episode no.: Season 7 Episode 3
- Directed by: Ken Whittingham; Doug Ellin
- Written by: Doug Ellin
- Cinematography by: Rob Sweeney
- Editing by: Steven Sprung
- Original release date: July 18, 2010
- Running time: 29 minutes

Guest appearances
- Beverly D'Angelo as Barbara Miller (special guest star); Randall Wallace as Himself (special guest star); Adrian Peterson as Himself (special guest star); Jeff Garlin as Roger Jay (special guest star); William Fichtner as Phil Yagoda (special guest star); Autumn Reeser as Lizzie Grant; Dania Ramirez as Alex; Taylor Cole as Antique Dealer; Cassidy Lehrman as Sarah Gold; Paul Herman as Marvin

Episode chronology
← Previous "Buzzed"	Next → "Tequila Sunrise"

"Dramedy" is the third episode of the seventh season of the American comedy-drama television series Entourage. It is the 81st overall episode of the series and was written by series creator Doug Ellin, and directed by Ellin and Ken Whittingham. It originally aired on HBO on July 18, 2010.

The series chronicles the acting career of Vincent Chase, a young A-list movie star, and his childhood friends from Queens, New York City, as they attempt to further their nascent careers in Los Angeles. In the episode, Drama considers starring in a sitcom, while Scott Lavin gets more involved with Vince. Meanwhile, Ari is pressured by Lizzie in promoting her.

According to Nielsen Media Research, the episode was seen by an estimated 2.56 million household viewers and gained a 1.5/5 ratings share among adults aged 18–49. The episode received negative reviews from critics, particularly for its aimlessness and lack of character development.

== Plot ==
Vince (Adrian Grenier) continues hanging out with Scott (Scott Caan), frustrating Eric (Kevin Connolly). Eric then takes Drama (Kevin Dillon) to meet writer Roger Jay (Jeff Garlin), who offers a sitcom script to Drama. Drama is unwilling to work in a sitcom, although he finds himself drawn to the story through his timing.

Melissa (Perrey Reeves) starts ignoring Ari (Jeremy Piven), as he is still working with Lizzie (Autumn Reeser). Ari informs his staff that he is working on owning a Los Angeles-based team for the NFL, which is met with a positive response. However, Lizzie asks to be promoted to Andrew's position of head of television, especially as Andrew is currently on rehabilitation. Ari refuses, prompting Lizzie to tell Barbara (Beverly D'Angelo), threatening to quit if she does not get the promotion. Despite Barbara ordering him to do it, Ari refuses, and Lizzie quits. Turtle (Jerry Ferrara) realizes that his business is now losing money. When he tells the girls he will have to cut their salary in half, they decide to quit instead, ending his business. He meets with Alex (Dania Ramirez), and she convinces him in accompanying her to Mexico to make money.

Needing an actor to play his on-screen brother, Johnny asks Yagoda (William Fichtner) for help, and he in turn convinces John Stamos to sign. Vince accompanies Scott to an auction, where he decides to buy a $250,000 dinosaur head owned by Adrian Peterson. During this, Scott introduces him to Randall Wallace, who offers Vince the chance to play Air-Walker on a film. Vince then decides to throw a party at his mansion, where Eric angrily arrives upon learning that Scott is now making offers to Vince. Eric and Scott get into a small fight, until Eric pushes Scott, causing him to accidentally break the dinosaur head.

== Production ==
=== Development ===
The episode was written by series creator Doug Ellin, and directed by Ellin and Ken Whittingham. This was Ellin's 53rd writing credit, Whittingham's tenth directing credit, and Ellin's third directing credit.

== Reception ==
=== Viewers ===
In its original American broadcast, "Dramedy" was seen by an estimated 2.56 million household viewers with a 1.5/5 in the 18–49 demographics. This means that 1.5 percent of all households with televisions watched the episode, while 5 percent of all of those watching television at the time of the broadcast watched it. This was a slight increase in viewership with the previous episode, which was watched by an estimated 2.55 million household viewers with a 1.5/5 in the 18–49 demographics.

=== Critical reviews ===
"Dramedy" received negative reviews from critics. Dan Phillips of IGN gave the episode an "okay" 6.5 out of 10 and wrote, ""Dramedy" was a slight improvement over this season's first two episodes in at least one regard: it established some intriguing dramatic storylines for its main characters, even if it continued the season's struggle to generate big laughs. As is typically the case with this show, the strongest of these ongoing plotlines involves Drama's search for a new TV project, which came the closest this week to hitting the comedic mark. The rest of the dramatic arcs also offered a decent amount of interesting developments, just not many I would consider all that funny. All in all, "Dramedy" was a small step up from "Stunted" and "Buzzed" – just not the giant one many of us were looking for."

Steve Heisler of The A.V. Club gave the episode a "D–" grade and wrote, "In the absence of caring about a character, Entourage has resorted to simply telling me to care. In the world of Entourage, if it's worth thinking. It's worth saying. Poorly." The Wall Street Journal wrote, "now that the series' writers are making a bid for the characters to grow apart and mature, we're left with slight plots that illuminate shallow lives."

Josh Wigler of MTV wrote, "It looks like the Vince-Eric-Scott work triangle is the story to watch this season. Let's see how it continues to play out." Janaki Cedanna of TV Fodder gave the episode a 1.5 out of 5 rating and wrote, "Overall, this episode was pretty weak in its lazy plot devices, forced dialogue, bad pacing and humorless script."

Kate Stanhope of TV Guide wrote, "Ari may be on top of the world because of the NFL deal, but Lizzie Grant is determined to bring him down from his pigskin high." Eric Hochberger of TV Fanatic gave the episode a 3.2 star rating out of 5 and wrote, "This is supposed to be a mindless half hour escape for us. This is not a drama. This never has been. Like Johnny learned today, we'd rather laugh and have fun with these guys."
