= Give a Little Bit (Entourage) =

- Entourage episode
- Episode no.: Season 6 Episode 12
- Directed by: Mark Mylod
- Written by: Doug Ellin; Ally Musika
- Cinematography by: Todd A. Dos Reis
- Editing by: Gregg Featherman
- Original release date: October 4, 2009
- Running time: 38 minutes

Guest appearances
- Beverly D'Angelo as Barbara Miller (special guest star); Jamie-Lynn Sigler as Herself (special guest star); William Fichtner as Phil Yagoda (special guest star); Bono as Himself (special guest star); Matt Damon as Himself (special guest star); LeBron James as Himself (special guest star); Malcolm McDowell as Terrence McQuewick (special guest star); Jordan Belfi as Adam Davies; Nora Dunn as Dr. Marcus; Jana Kramer as Brooke Manning; Nicky Whelan as Air Hostess; Terasa Livingstone as Stewardess

Episode chronology
← Previous "Scared Straight"	Next → "Stunted"

"Give a Little Bit" is the twelfth episode and season finale of the sixth season of the American comedy-drama television series Entourage. It is the 78th overall episode of the series and was written by series creator Doug Ellin and executive producer Ally Musika, and directed by co-executive producer Mark Mylod. It originally aired on HBO on October 4, 2009.

The series chronicles the acting career of Vincent Chase, a young A-list movie star, and his childhood friends from Queens, New York City, as they attempt to further their nascent careers in Los Angeles. In the episode, Vince is pressured by Matt Damon to take part in his charity, while Drama re-auditions. Meanwhile, Turtle prepares to meet with Jamie-Lynn Sigler in New Zealand, while Eric is ready to confess his feelings for Sloan.

According to Nielsen Media Research, the episode was seen by an estimated 2.49 million household viewers and gained a 1.5/4 ratings share among adults aged 18–49. The episode received extremely positive reviews from critics, who praised the closure of the story arcs and character development.

== Plot ==
Vince (Adrian Grenier) is about to leave for Italy, and Drama (Kevin Dillon) is willing to accompany him, refusing to attend his Melrose 2009 audition. However, they are approached by Matt Damon, who pressures Vince in taking part of a charity for child famine. Vince states he is unable to attend, but promises to leave a considerable check.

Ari (Jeremy Piven) and Melissa (Perrey Reeves) attend marriage counseling, as Melissa is angry that Ari is taking $12 million of her money for the merger. Ari gives a heartfelt speech explaining his decision, and she agrees to let him use her money. However, Ari is infuriated when he learns that Terrence (Malcolm McDowell) wants to keep his name on the company, and refuses to go forward with the deal. Terrence privately talks with Ari, apologizing for firing him and confiding that he chose him because he fully trusts in his vision to maintain the company for many decades. Ari signs the deal to keep the name, and proceeds to fire TMA's agents he disliked, such as Adam Davies (Jordan Belfi), by firing paintballs. Lloyd (Rex Lee) prepares to quit, but is astounded when Ari promotes him to his desired agent position.

Drama changes his mind and decides to audition for Melrose 2009, impressing Yagoda (William Fichtner). However, while Yagoda likes his performance, the network decides to pass on him as they consider him too old for the role. Despite that, the network wants to work with Drama on a new series, which he agrees. Eric (Kevin Connolly) takes Sloan (Emmanuelle Chriqui) on a lunch outside the city, despite Sloan asking to be back in time due to other commitments. During lunch, Sloan realizes Eric's plans to get back together and angrily demands they return to Los Angeles. As they argue, Eric pulls over the car to express his feelings for her, and then shocks her by proposing marriage. Nevertheless, Sloan accepts.

Turtle (Jerry Ferrara) is unsatisfied with his relationship with Brooke (Jana Kramer), a sorority girl. Unable to move on without Jamie-Lynn Sigler, Turtle decides to book a flight to New Zealand when she does not answer his calls. Before the plane takes off, Sigler finally answers, explaining that she does not want to make him lose part of his life by trying to make their relationship work. Turtle finally accepts the break-up, although he is unable to leave the plane and is forced to go to New Zealand. Right before Vince and Drama leave for Italy, they are cornered by Damon, LeBron James and Bono, who are all angry with Vince's weak $10,000 donation. They pressure him in increasing it to $150,000, which he agrees to make. They are joined by Eric and Sloan, who confirm their engagement. Eric decides to not go with the boys to Italy, preferring to stay with Sloan.

In a post-credits scene, Damon leaves a phone message to Vince from Haiti, complaining that he has not sent the check. Damon turns aggressive, insulting Vince before breaking down in despair and apologizing for his behavior.

== Production ==
=== Development ===
The episode was written by series creator Doug Ellin and executive producer Ally Musika, and directed by co-executive producer Mark Mylod. This was Ellin's 51st writing credit, Musika's 13th writing credit, and Mylod's 23rd directing credit.

== Reception ==
=== Viewers ===
In its original American broadcast, "Give a Little Bit" was seen by an estimated 2.49 million household viewers with a 1.5/4 in the 18–49 demographics. This means that 1.5 percent of all households with televisions watched the episode, while 4 percent of all of those watching television at the time of the broadcast watched it. This was a 33% increase in viewership with the previous episode, which was watched by an estimated 1.87 million household viewers with a 1.6/4 in the 18–49 demographics.

=== Critical reviews ===
"Give a Little Bit" received extremely positive reviews from critics. Ahsan Haque of IGN gave the episode an "amazing" 9 out of 10 and wrote, "While there was no exciting cliffhanger to close out the season, there were some life-changing moments for Vince's entourage here that should set the tone for next season. Some might argue that there wasn't enough going on this season, but Entourage has always been more about this core group of characters than about telling compelling stories. In that respect, it's been a great ride, and now we've got to wait until next year to see where things go from here."

Josh Modell of The A.V. Club gave the episode a "B" grade and wrote, "pretty decent half-hour of TV, am I right? There was a moment in the middle when I thought they were setting up next season to have all of the guys scattered to the winds, which I thought was actually a decent plan: It'd be a great way to introduce more minor characters, and get away from that scene in every episode where the four dudes are just goofing around and dissing each other. We’re past that point, aren't we?" Emily Christner of TV Guide wrote, "Vince and Drama fly off into the sunset to meet Turtle in Rome, sans E. Is this a new era for Vince and the boys?"

Jonathan Toomey of TV Squad wrote, "Was that really an Entourage season finale? It was so... good. It was as if every conversation I've ever had with my buddies after another season of Entourage and all of the "man, I really wish they had done this or included that" requests were jammed into this episode. Maybe Entourage should have double-length installments more often." Eric Hochberger of TV Fanatic wrote, "Last night Entourage ended its sixth season in typical fashion with the boy(s) boarding the plane to go film Vince's next movie. This time around, however, Vince might not be getting his whole gang."

Emmanuelle Chriqui and Matt Damon submitted this episode for consideration for Outstanding Guest Actress in a Comedy Series and Outstanding Guest Actor in a Comedy Series, while Mark Mylod submitted it for Outstanding Directing for a Comedy Series, and Doug Ellin and Ally Musika submitted it for Outstanding Writing for a Comedy Series at the 62nd Primetime Emmy Awards.
