= Buzzed (Entourage) =

- Entourage episode
- Episode no.: Season 7 Episode 2
- Directed by: Tucker Gates
- Written by: Ally Musika
- Cinematography by: Todd A. Dos Reis
- Editing by: Jeff Groth
- Original release date: July 11, 2010
- Running time: 26 minutes

Guest appearances
- Nick Cassavetes as Himself (special guest star); Bob Saget as Himself (special guest star); Jerry Jones as Himself (special guest star); Maria Menounos as Herself (special guest star); Debi Mazar as Shauna Roberts (special guest star); Autumn Reeser as Lizzie Grant; Dania Ramirez as Alex; Jonathan Keltz as Jake Steinberg; Megan Park as Interview Girl; Janet Montgomery as Jennie

Episode chronology
← Previous "Stunted"	Next → "Dramedy"

"Buzzed" is the second episode of the seventh season of the American comedy-drama television series Entourage. It is the 80th overall episode of the series and was written by executive producer Ally Musika, and directed by Tucker Gates. It originally aired on HBO on July 11, 2010.

The series chronicles the acting career of Vincent Chase, a young A-list movie star, and his childhood friends from Queens, New York City, as they attempt to further their nascent careers in Los Angeles. In the episode, Vince jeopardizes his film's prospects during an interview, while Ari works with Lizzie in securing an NFL deal.

According to Nielsen Media Research, the episode was seen by an estimated 2.55 million household viewers and gained a 1.5/5 ratings share among adults aged 18–49. The episode received negative reviews from critics, who criticized the writing and lack of ideas in the episode, although Bob Saget received some praise for his appearance.

== Plot ==
Turtle (Jerry Ferrara) is shocked when he discovers a massive $10,000 charge in his credit card. Deducing that Alex (Dania Ramirez) was involved, he confronts her. Alex then states that she used $1,000 to buy Turtle's mother a new gift, and Turtle decides to leave the matter aside.

Vince (Adrian Grenier) surprises the boys when he reveals a self-made haircut, claiming that his film with Nick Cassavetes is finished. He then takes part in an Access Hollywood interview with Maria Menounos to promote the Enzo Ferrari biopic, under the supervision of Shauna (Debi Mazar). However, he shocks his team when he jokingly refers that the film might be poorly received, infuriating Shauna. She tries to get Menounos from dropping the quote, but her past with Menounos makes it impossible. To complicate matters, Cassavetes is angry over Vince's haircut, as he never told him the film was ready and he wanted to film more scenes. While visiting Eric (Kevin Connolly) with Drama (Kevin Dillon), Vince is swayed by Scott Lavin (Scott Caan), who invites him to jump off a plane with him.

Wanting to seize the NFL TV rights, Ari (Jeremy Piven) meets with Jerry Jones to discuss a partnership. However, he also has to deal with Vince's erratic behavior, failing to calm Cassavetes. During a meeting, Lizzie (Autumn Reeser) convinces him to be part of the deal. Later, they are called by Jones, who states that the NFL is looking at an internal sale, disappointing them. However, Jones offers Ari the chance of owning a Los Angeles-based team. As Ari and Lizzie embrace over the news, Melissa (Perrey Reeves) walks in, upset upon knowing Lizzie destroyed the Kleins' marriage.

== Production ==
=== Development ===
The episode was written by executive producer Ally Musika, and directed by Tucker Gates. This was Musika's 14th writing credit and Gates' first directing credit.

== Reception ==
=== Viewers ===
In its original American broadcast, "Buzzed" was seen by an estimated 2.55 million household viewers with a 1.5/5 in the 18–49 demographics. This means that 1.5 percent of all households with televisions watched the episode, while 5 percent of all of those watching television at the time of the broadcast watched it. This was a slight increase in viewership with the previous episode, which was watched by an estimated 2.48 million household viewers with a 1.5/4 in the 18–49 demographics.

=== Critical reviews ===
"Buzzed" received negative reviews from critics. Dan Phillips of IGN gave the episode a "mediocre" 5 out of 10 and wrote, "How much gas does Entourage have left in its tanks? Judging by the first two episodes of this seventh season, which one could hardly call laugh riots or compellingly dramatic half-hours, the answer to that question would seem to be a resounding "not much." Anytime a series confuses a haircut for a major plot development, or the same old tired, expletive-laced insults as comedy, it may be a strong indication the show is running on empty."

Steve Heisler of The A.V. Club gave the episode a "C+" grade and wrote, "The show has an uncanny ability to discover new ways its characters can freak out each time. But after a while, everything being important means nothing is important. It's rare I'd be a proponent for a show to tackle less each week, but I feel like Entourage could benefit from a problem without an easy answer, one that takes multiple weeks to resolve and lets its characters be tested a little. Seven seasons later, though, Entourage just can't bring itself to do that. It's always sunny in Los Angeles, it seems."

Allyssa Lee of Los Angeles Times wrote, "Vince's transformation only started there. It seems the movie star's near-death experience has launched him into an existential state where he feels the need for speed and jump out of planes or heli board in order to feel truly alive." Josh Wigler of MTV wrote, "Overall, a pretty solid episode with interesting implications for the season's future. Plus, there was a Bob Saget cameo, and you can never go wrong with a Bob Saget cameo."

Kate Stanhope of TV Guide wrote, "Vince quickly cuts the two off, saying he needs to go and jump out of a plane. Scotty yells to Eric that he'll take care of Vince — to Eric's shock and dismay — and Vince gracefully leaps out of the plane." Eric Hochberger of TV Fanatic gave the episode a 3 star rating out of 5 and wrote, "It's not saying much, but Entourage's second effort this season was a little better than its weak premiere. Though still not much action has happened in "Buzzed," at least the episode brought us Jerry Jones and a direction for Ari's storyline."
