= Tequila Sunrise (Entourage) =

- Entourage episode
- Episode no.: Season 7 Episode 4
- Directed by: Adam Davidson
- Written by: Doug Ellin
- Cinematography by: Todd. A Dos Reis
- Editing by: Gregg Featherman
- Original release date: July 25, 2010
- Running time: 30 minutes

Guest appearances
- Beverly D'Angelo as Barbara Miller (special guest star); Tom Sizemore as Himself (special guest star); Shawne Merriman as Himself (special guest star); John Heard as Richard Wimmer (special guest star); Miguel Sandoval as Carlos (special guest star); Alan Dale as John Ellis (special guest star); William Fichtner as Phil Yagoda (special guest star); John Stamos as Himself (special guest star); Gary Cole as Andrew Klein (special guest star); Autumn Reeser as Lizzie Grant; Dania Ramirez as Alex; Jonathan Keltz as Jake Steinberg; Janet Montgomery as Jennie; David Grant Wright as Billionaire

Episode chronology
← Previous "Dramedy"	Next → "Bottoms Up"

"Tequila Sunrise" is the fourth episode of the seventh season of the American comedy-drama television series Entourage. It is the 82nd overall episode of the series and was written by series creator Doug Ellin, and directed by Adam Davidson. It originally aired on HBO on July 25, 2010.

The series chronicles the acting career of Vincent Chase, a young A-list movie star, and his childhood friends from Queens, New York City, as they attempt to further their nascent careers in Los Angeles. In the episode, Drama tries to convince John Stamos in doing the sitcom with him, while Eric competes with Scott over Vince. Meanwhile, Ari continues with his NFL plan, while Turtle goes to Mexico with Alex.

According to Nielsen Media Research, the episode was seen by an estimated 2.58 million household viewers and gained a 1.6/5 ratings share among adults aged 18–49. The episode received generally positive reviews from critics, who noted it as an improvement over the previous episodes.

== Plot ==
Eric (Kevin Connolly) is annoyed over Vince (Adrian Grenier) taking offers from Scott (Scott Caan), especially when he already read the script for the Air-Walker film. While Eric likes the script, he is frustrated that Scott has already set up meetings without consulting him. After talking with Sloan (Emmanuelle Chriqui), Eric decides to patch things up with Scott, who in turn admits his jealousy of Eric.

Ari (Jeremy Piven) tries to part in good terms with Lizzie (Autumn Reeser), but she angrily dismisses his words, warning him she will get revenge eventually. Ari and Barbara (Beverly D'Angelo) then attend a meeting with executives over the plan to expand the NFL into Los Angeles, successfully winning them over. Later, Ari is called by Andrew (Gary Cole), still in rehabilitation, who warns him that Lizzie is planning to use her contacts to go after his clients. In Mexico, Turtle (Jerry Ferrara) and Alex (Dania Ramirez) are taken to a mansion by her friend, Carlos (Miguel Sandoval), owner of an expensive tequila brand. Turtle realizes that they want him to use Vince for their brand, and intends to leave Mexico, although Alex convinces him in staying.

Drama (Kevin Dillon) invites John Stamos to Vince's mansion, hoping to convince him in starring in the sitcom. Noting his ping-pong table, Stamos decides to play with Drama. Drama easily wins their match, prompting an angry Stamos to leave. Yagoda (William Fichtner) admonishes Drama for his actions, as Stamos is known for constantly losing in games. He orders him to make amends, as the network won't move forward with the sitcom if Stamos leaves. He visits Stamos at his club, and they decide to do a rematch, wherein Stamos will agree to the sitcom if he loses. Stamos manages to win the game, although he still intends to read the script. Vince and Drama then leave with Stamos and Scott on a trip to Las Vegas, while Eric is forced to stay behind as he has to arrange his wedding.

== Production ==
=== Development ===
The episode was written by series creator Doug Ellin, and directed by Adam Davidson. This was Ellin's 54th writing credit, and Davidson's first directing credit.

== Reception ==
=== Viewers ===
In its original American broadcast, "Tequila Sunrise" was seen by an estimated 2.58 million household viewers with a 1.6/5 in the 18–49 demographics. This means that 1.6 percent of all households with televisions watched the episode, while 5 percent of all of those watching television at the time of the broadcast watched it. This was a slight increase in viewership with the previous episode, which was watched by an estimated 2.56 million household viewers with a 1.5/5 in the 18–49 demographics.

=== Critical reviews ===
"Tequila Sunrise" received generally positive reviews from critics. Dan Phillips of IGN gave the episode an "good" 7.5 out of 10 and wrote, "Entourage got back to what it does best with its latest episode, "Tequila Sunrise", satirizing Hollywood culture and celebrity egos through a new storyline featuring Johnny Drama and his would-be new co-star, John Stamos. Seeing as how Drama has always been one of the two comedic stars of this series (alongside Ari Gold), it's no surprise that the first episode centered on his exploits was also the first of this season to truly hit the mark. Now if only the writers could find a way to kick Ari's story into gear and this season might finally get off the ground."

Steve Heisler of The A.V. Club gave the episode a "B–" grade and wrote, "It wasn't so bad. A few things wrapped up way too neatly, and a few others basically spun their wheels, but there was a good sense of the story (some semblance of one, at least) moving forward, and we got to witness some awesome ping pong courtesy of Uncle Jesse. It was actually alright." Joe Flint of Los Angeles Times wrote, "As riveting as it might be to portray a star on top of the world on the verge of losing it all, that sort of drama is not this show's strong suit. Entourage is leaving at the right time. Let's hope it goes out the way it came in."

Janaki Cedanna of TV Fodder gave the episode a 4 out of 5 rating and wrote, "Overall, I thought the episode was very well done as it had great locations and extras as well as quick pacing." Eric Hochberger of TV Fanatic gave the episode a 3.7 star rating out of 5 and wrote, "For the first time for the last two seasons, we can finally say we really enjoyed an episode of Entourage! This week's episode, "Tequila Sunrise," was actually, dare we say it, good!"
