= Stunted (Entourage) =

- Entourage episode
- Episode no.: Season 7 Episode 1
- Directed by: Doug Ellin
- Written by: Doug Ellin
- Cinematography by: Rob Sweeney
- Editing by: Gregg Featherman
- Original release date: June 27, 2010
- Running time: 27 minutes

Guest appearances
- William Fichtner as Phil Yagoda (special guest star); Nick Cassavetes as Himself (special guest star); Dania Ramirez as Alex; Dale Dye as Stunt Coordinator; Jonathan Keltz as Jake Steinberg; Stephanie Vogt as Liz; Barrett Foa as Matt Wolpert

Episode chronology
← Previous "Give a Little Bit"	Next → "Buzzed"

"Stunted" is the first episode of the seventh season of the American comedy-drama television series Entourage. It is the 79th overall episode of the series and was written and directed by series creator Doug Ellin. It originally aired on HBO on June 27, 2010.

The series chronicles the acting career of Vincent Chase, a young A-list movie star, and his childhood friends from Queens, New York City, as they attempt to further their nascent careers in Los Angeles. In the episode, Vince is scared over performing a dangerous stunt for his new film, while Drama gets nervous as his holding contract is about to expire.

According to Nielsen Media Research, the episode was seen by an estimated 2.48 million household viewers and gained a 1.5/4 ratings share among adults aged 18–49. The episode received mixed reviews from critics, who noted the series' predictable storylines and lack of character development.

== Plot ==
Turtle (Jerry Ferrara) now runs a fledging car service business, hiring three women as employees. However, one of them, Alex (Dania Ramirez), struggles with the addresses and dampens the profits. Vince (Adrian Grenier) is filming a new film for director Nick Cassavetes, which requires stuntmen catching fire. Cassavetes is unconvinced of the stuntmen's work and assigns Vince to replace his stunt man for a dangerous stunt. Despite not discussing it first, Vince accepts.

Drama (Kevin Dillon) is frustrated that his holding contract will expire in 8 weeks, and he hasn't received a single project. He meets with Yagoda (William Fichtner), who claims his projects are getting rejected by the network. However, while talking with Lloyd (Rex Lee), Drama realizes that one of Yagoda's projects, a The Fall Guy reboot, is going forward but with Dean Cain instead. Ari (Jeremy Piven) and Eric (Kevin Connolly) are forced to intervene and talk Cassavetes out of doing the stunt, as he lacks the proper security and care. Cassavates is unaffected by their threats, and warns them against informing the studio.

Turtle talks with Alex over her problems, and she reveals she has been struggling since her parents are divorcing. Turtle consoles her, but when he approaches to kiss her, Alex decides to quit. Back on the set, Vince decides to go forward with the stunt. Despite the fact that he failed to brake in time and crashed part of the set, Cassavetes is convinced with the take, and Vince is willing to do it again.

== Production ==
=== Development ===
The episode was written and directed by series creator Doug Ellin. This was Ellin's 52nd writing credit and second directing credit.

== Reception ==
=== Viewers ===
In its original American broadcast, "Stunted" was seen by an estimated 2.48 million household viewers with a 1.5/4 in the 18–49 demographics. This means that 1.5 percent of all households with televisions watched the episode, while 4 percent of all of those watching television at the time of the broadcast watched it. This was a slight decrease in viewership with the previous episode, which was watched by an estimated 2.49 million household viewers with a 1.5/4 in the 18–49 demographics.

=== Critical reviews ===
"Stunted" received mixed reviews from critics. Dan Phillips of IGN gave the episode a "good" 7 out of 10 and wrote, "Entourage's biggest draw has always been the exotic escapism it offers us viewers, but the strength of that hook might be waning as the sight of these characters' luxurious lives becomes just as familiar as their storylines most years. Unless the new lease on life promised by Vince's accident at the end of this season pushes these characters down new roads, Season 7 could easily turn out to be the show's most forgettable. Let's hope that doesn't turn out to be the case, and Ellin and the gang figure out ways to make Hollywood seem fun, funny and fresh all over again."

Steve Heisler of The A.V. Club gave the episode a "C–" grade and wrote, "The episode was bereft of anything resembling plot development, character development, toplessness, or even a guest star getting his or her proverbial dong waxed. I suppose it was a different kind of Entourage episode, though I did have the thought, "Well, it wasn't good, but it sure beat watching nothing." Which is a feeling all too familiar."

Allyssa Lee of Los Angeles Times wrote, "After a year filled with Byzantine plots and heavy drama, it was nice to return to a light and refreshing summer program that goes down as easy as a well-made mint julep. And the Season 7 premiere didn't disappoint. Doug Ellin and Co. seem to be starting the series' second to last season not with a whimper but a big blazing fireball of a bang." Josh Wigler of MTV wrote, "All said, so far so good with the new season of Entourage. Let's see where Vinny and his pals go in the upcoming episodes, shall we?"

Kate Stanhope of TV Guide wrote, "Nick assures him the shot "looked sick" and Vince, looking somewhere halfway between dazed and enlightened, says he's ready to do the stunt again and slowly walks away. Does that mean the stunt will have some profound effect on Vince? Are we going to see him on fire next week?" Eric Hochberger of TV Fanatic gave the episode a 2.5 star rating out of 5 and wrote, "So far, jumping forward and dropping everyone in their own set of adventures made for a terrible season premiere, but hopefully will lead to a stronger season seven after such an underwhelming sixth."
