= Entourage (film) =

2015 film by Doug Ellin

- Theatrical release poster
- Directed by: Doug Ellin
- Screenplay by: Doug Ellin
- Story by: Doug Ellin; Rob Weiss
- Based on: Entourage by Doug Ellin
- Produced by: Mark Wahlberg; Stephen Levinson; Doug Ellin
- Starring: Kevin Connolly; Adrian Grenier; Kevin Dillon; Jerry Ferrara; Jeremy Piven
- Cinematography: Steven Fierberg
- Edited by: Jeff Groth
- Production companies: Home Box Office; RatPac-Dune Entertainment; Closest to the Hole Productions; Leverage Entertainment
- Distributed by: Warner Bros. Pictures
- Release dates: May 27, 2015 (Paris Theater); June 3, 2015 (United States)
- Running time: 104 minutes
- Country: United States
- Language: English
- Budget: $27–39 million
- Box office: $49.3 million

Entourage is a 2015 American satirical comedy-drama film written, directed, and produced by Doug Ellin, who conceived the story with Rob Weiss. It serves as a continuation of the HBO television series of the same name. The film stars the principal cast of the show, Kevin Connolly, Adrian Grenier, Kevin Dillon, Jerry Ferrara, and Jeremy Piven. The plot follows actor Vincent Chase (Grenier), who goes over budget on his directorial debut and must ask newly appointed studio head Ari Gold (Piven) for more money.

After it was confirmed that the series would end in 2011 with season 8, Ellin and the cast expressed their interest in doing a feature film. After script and production issues, the project was officially announced in 2013, and filming began around Los Angeles in February 2014. Like in the series, many celebrity sportspeople and actors appear as themselves, while several supporting cast members from the show reprise their roles.

Entourage premiered at the Paris Theater in Manhattan on May 27, 2015, and was theatrically released in the United States by Warner Bros. Pictures on June 3, 2015. The film received generally negative reviews from critics and grossed $49.3 million worldwide, against a production cost of $27–39 million.

== Plot ==
Just nine days after the finale of the show, Vincent Chase has separated from his wife and throws a party on his yacht, with his friends E, Johnny and Turtle joining to cheer him up. Wishing to do something new with his career, he calls his former agent-turned-studio head Ari Gold, who offers Vince a leading role in his first studio production. Vince says he will only star in it if he directs.

Eight months later, Hyde, Vince's directorial debut, is in the middle of post-production and is over budget by $15 million. Needing more money, Vince asks Ari if they can get an additional $10 million to complete the movie. Reluctant, but wanting to please him, Ari flies to Texas to meet the co-financiers of the movie, Larsen McCredle and his son Travis, to convince them to invest more money into the film. Hesitant, Larsen sends Travis with him back to Los Angeles to see a cut of the film at Vince's private screening.

Vince has second thoughts on the rough cut, so cancels the screening out of fear no one will enjoy it. He later gives Ari and Travis a copy of the movie for their viewing. Ari and Travis enjoy the movie but Travis requests that Ari cut the scenes with Vince's brother, Johnny "Drama" Chase, out of the movie or he will not give the film the extra money.

With Ari giving him no answer, Travis puts the post-production on hold. Vince and Eric "E" Murphy visit him to come up with a solution, but this results in him saying he did not like Vince's performance either so wants the entire movie to be redone with a new lead and director. In addition, studio CEO John Ellis removes Ari from the production.

The boys soon realize the reason Travis is angry over the movie is that he discovered that Vince is secretly dating Emily Ratajkowski, whom he is infatuated with. Learning of this, Ari interrupts Ellis in a boardroom meeting with Larsen and Travis with this information. Surprised, Larsen says he will stay behind the movie but mandates the condition that Ari is no longer working for the studio because, although he agreed his son was being juvenile, Ari had disrespected him. Simultaneously, the boys are at the hospital as E's ex-fiancée Sloan goes into labor. She gives birth to a girl, Ryan Murphy, resulting in Sloan and E deciding to get back together and vowing to make it work this time.

As the boys celebrate, Ari arrives at the hospital and announces that he resigned. In lieu of his severance, he has negotiated part of the backend grosses. Hyde becomes a box office hit, grossing over $450 million worldwide. At the Golden Globe Awards, Drama ends up winning the award for Best Supporting Actor. Stunned, he goes to accept the award and is silent for a moment before yelling his trademark Viking Quest phrase, "VICTORY!!!"

In a mid-credits scene, Ari's former assistant Lloyd has his wedding and Ari gives him away. When the group gets together for a picture, Billy Walsh suggests they make a film (or TV show) about the lives of Vince and the gang.

== Cast ==
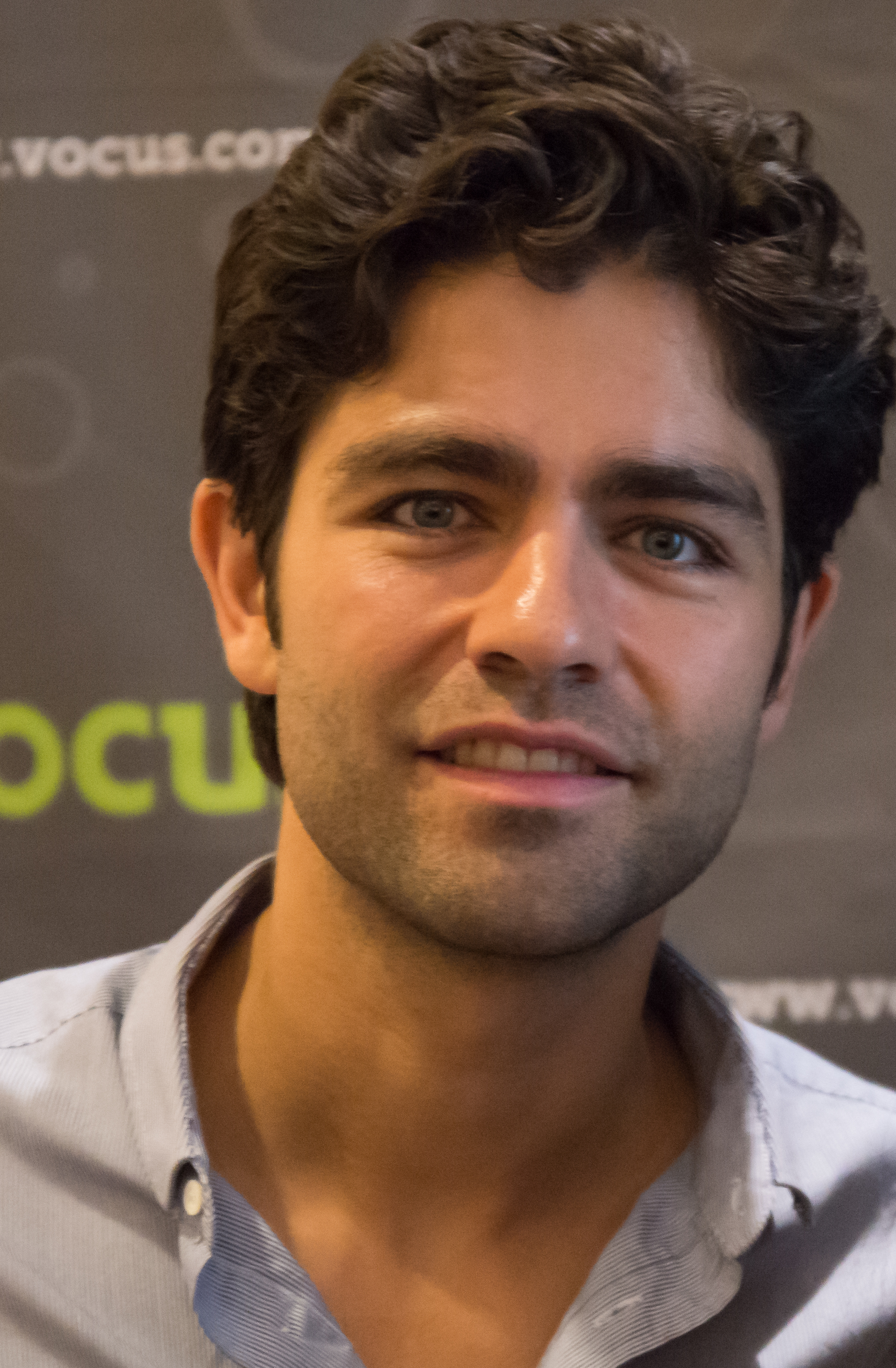
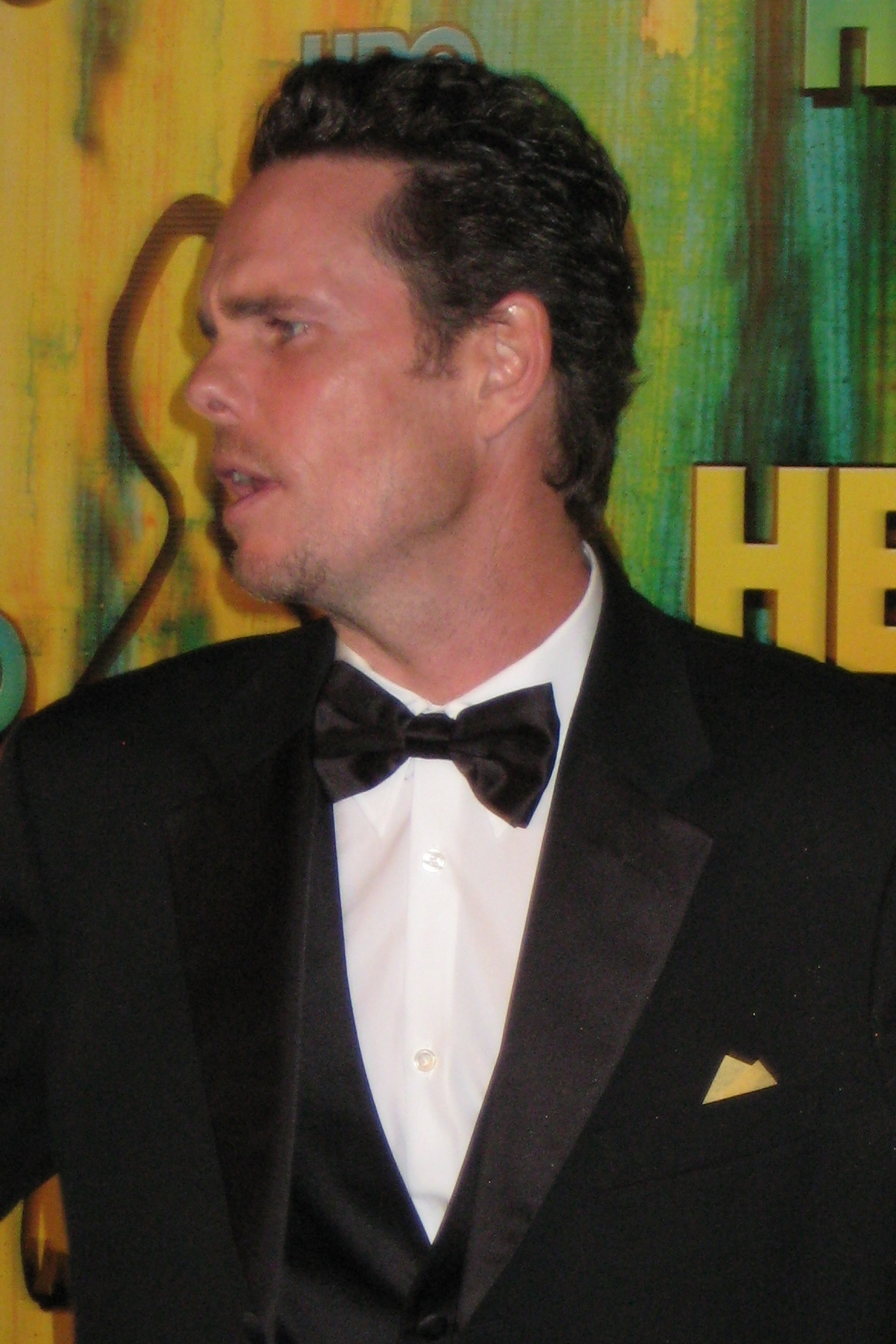
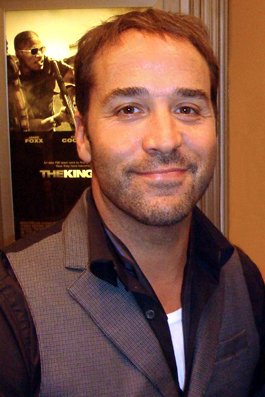
Adrian Grenier, Kevin Dillon and Jeremy Piven
- Kevin Connolly as Eric Murphy
- Adrian Grenier as Vincent Chase
- Kevin Dillon as Johnny "Drama" Chase
- Jerry Ferrara as Salvatore "Turtle" Assante
- Jeremy Piven as Ari Gold
- Emmanuelle Chriqui as Sloan McQuewick
- Perrey Reeves as Melissa Gold
- Rex Lee as Lloyd Lee
- Debi Mazar as Shauna Roberts
- Rhys Coiro as Billy Walsh
- Constance Zimmer as Dana Gordon
- Haley Joel Osment as Travis McCredle
- Ronda Rousey as herself
- Scott Mescudi as Allen, Ari's assistant
- Alan Dale as John Ellis
- Emily Ratajkowski as herself
- Billy Bob Thornton as Larsen McCredle
- Nora Dunn as Dr. Marcus
- Sabina Gadecki as Melanie
- Alice Eve as Sophia
- Martin Landau as Bob Ryan
- Dan Patrick as Stooge
- Judy Greer as Casting Director

=== Cameos ===
The following portray fictionalized versions of themselves:

- Jessica Alba
- Nina Agdal
- David Arquette
- Shayna Baszler
- Tom Brady
- Warren Buffett
- Gary Busey
- Andrew Dice Clay
- Linda Cohn
- Tameka Cottle
- Common
- Mark Cuban
- Baron Davis
- Jessamyn Duke
- Julian Edelman
- David Faustino
- Jon Favreau
- Kelsey Grammer
- Jim Gray
- Rob Gronkowski
- Armie Hammer
- Calvin Harris
- Thierry Henry
- Terrence J
- Cynthia Kirchner
- Matt Lauer
- Greg Louganis
- Chad Lowe
- Clay Matthews III
- Maria Menounos
- Alyssa Miller
- Piers Morgan
- Liam Neeson
- Ed O'Neill
- Mike Richards
- Stevan Ridley
- Bob Saget
- Saigon
- Richard Schiff
- David Spade
- George Takei
- T.I.
- Steve Tisch
- Steve Nash
- Mike Tyson
- Mark Wahlberg
- Pharrell Williams
- Russell Wilson

== Production ==
In August 2010, when it was confirmed that the eighth season of Entourage would be the last, creator Doug Ellin expressed interest in writing a film after the series ended. In September 2011, Adrian Grenier confirmed that there would be a film, and a script just needed to be written first. The series' executive producer Mark Wahlberg also confirmed that a film is in the works and said, "I will do everything to get this film made".

The film was officially green-lit in 2013, with Ellin directing and Warner Bros. distributing. However, by September 2013, amid reports that there had been significant delays in production and contract issues with the film's cast, Ellin stated the film was "less and less likely every day." Nevertheless, by October 2013, the cast had reached a deal, allowing the film to move forward.

Principal photography officially began on February 19, 2014, in Los Angeles, with additional filming in Miami. While filming in California, the production spent $39 million and received the California Film & Television Tax Credit. Filming was disrupted when Kevin Connolly broke his leg filming a football scene with Russell Wilson, which resulted in a number of script changes to accommodate it. In March 2014, it was reported that adult film actresses Lilly Banks, Maia Davis, Spencer Scott, and Anna Morna had shot scenes for the film. Several cast members shot a scene for the film on the red carpet at the 72nd Golden Globe Awards on January 11, 2015.

== Release ==
The film was previously set for a June 12, 2015 release, but on October 24, 2013, Warner Bros. moved it up a week to June 5, 2015. In April 2015, the release date was moved up two days to June 3, 2015.

=== Home media ===
Entourage was released by Warner Home Video on DVD and Blu-ray on September 29, 2015, in the United States.

== Reception ==
=== Box office ===
Entourage grossed $32.4 million in the United States and Canada and $16.9 million in other territories for a worldwide total of $49.3 million, against a production budget of $39 million.

In North America, the film grossed $2 million from its early Tuesday night showings and $5.4 million on its opening day (Wednesday), including Tuesday previews, from 3,058 theaters. The film earned $2 million and $3.7 million on Thursday and Friday, respectively. For its opening weekend (Friday–Sunday), it grossed $10.4 million (a five-day total of $17.8 million), finishing at fourth place at the box office behind Spy ($29.1 million), San Andreas ($25.8 million), and Insidious: Chapter 3 ($22.7 million). Given the film's $39 million production budget, as well as an additional $40.7 million spent on advertisement, Warner Bros. and HBO Films were hoping for an opening of at least $20 million, and the film was considered a financial disappointment. The film dropped 59% in its sophomore weekend to $4.2 million, finishing 5th.

In Australia, the film opened at number one, earning $2.6 million.

=== Critical response ===
On review aggregator website Rotten Tomatoes, the film holds an approval rating of 32% based on 210 reviews, with an average rating of 4.70/10. The site's critical consensus reads, "Entourage retains many elements of the HBO series, but feels less like a film than a particularly shallow, cameo-studded extended episode of the show." On Metacritic, the film has a weighted average score of 38 out of 100, based on 40 critics, indicating "generally unfavorable" reviews. In CinemaScore polls, audiences gave the film an average grade of "A−" on an A+ to F scale.

Brian Tallerico, writing for RogerEbert.com, awarded the film one and a half out of four stars, saying "Instead of challenging his characters or giving them something new to do, Ellin just high fives them on the way to the winner's circle." Mark Kermode, writing for The Guardian, gave the film one out of five stars, and wrote that "The Human Centipede was more sensitively attuned to issues of gender politics. And it had better jokes. Even producer/inspiration Marky Mark [Mark Wahlberg] looks embarrassed by his cameo." Ultimately, Kermode would rank Entourage as the worst film of 2015 and later, in 2018, the worst film of the decade to that point. Also in the show on BBC with Simon Mayo, Mayo described movie as"If the apocalypse happened now it would be a good thing", also stating before" You wouldn't want to spend 5 minutes with these people". IGN awarded Entourage a 7.5 out of 10, saying "When it sticks to what it has always been best at, the relationship of these four friends, it is as good as the series ever was".

== See also ==
- List of films featuring fictional films
