= Jerry Ferrara =

American actor (born 1979)

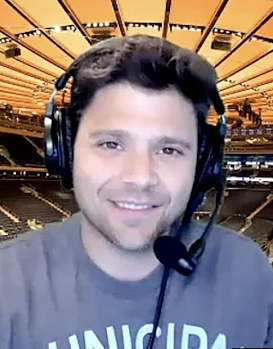
- Ferrara in 2021
- Born: November 25, 1979 (age 46); New York City, U.S.
- Occupation: Actor
- Years active: 2000–present
- Children: 3

Jerry Ferrara (born November 25, 1979) is an American actor. He is known for his role as Turtle on the HBO comedy series Entourage, and starred on the Starz drama series Power as Joe Proctor.

== Life and career ==
Ferrara was born in New York City and grew up in Bensonhurst, Brooklyn. He is of Italian descent.

He graduated from New Utrecht High School. Ferrara began studying theater in college, where he was inspired by a teacher to pursue a career in acting. An agent he met at a talent showcase encouraged him to move to Los Angeles, where he quickly landed his first role on The King of Queens. Other television parts soon followed. Jerry was then cast in the independent feature Cross Bronx, which premiered at the 2004 Tribeca Film Festival.

In an interview about his breakout role on Entourage, Ferrara revealed that when he told his friends he had landed a major part in a television pilot, they asked, "How about you get a dog who becomes your best friend and you name him Awnold??" Kevin Connolly has said of his Entourage co-star that "Jerry's very domesticated. He's probably the most different from his character. He's like 180 degrees in the opposite direction."

Ferrara once made an appearance in character as Turtle for a DirecTV commercial. His dialogue was mixed with a clip from an Entourage episode for humorous effect.

Ferrara is also co-founder of Fat Sal's deli in West Hollywood, California. He also appeared in Series 19, episode 12 of "Diners, Drive in's and Dives", representing Fat Sal's deli. In 2010, Ferrara dropped weight and lost 60 pounds with a new outlook on health and fitness.

Ferrara currently co-hosts Throwbacks with Matt Leinart.

== Filmography ==
=== Film ===
Year	Title	Role	Notes
2004	Cross Bronx	Vivo	
2007	Where God Left His Shoes	Vinny	
2007	Brooklyn Rules	Bobby Canzoneri	
2007	Gardener of Eden	Greek	
2008	Eagle Eye	Jerry's Friend #1	Uncredited
2011	Seven Days in Utopia	Joe Buckner	
2012	Think Like a Man	Jeremy Kern	
2012	Battleship	Sampson JOOD Strodell	
2012	A Band Called Death	—N/a	Producer
2013	Empire State	Jimmy	
2013	Last Vegas	Dean	
2013	Lone Survivor	Sergeant Hasslert	
2014	Think Like a Man Too	Jeremy Kern	
2014	Flight 7500	Rick	
2015	Entourage	Salvatore "Turtle" Assante	
2015	Club Life	Johnny D	
2016	Sully	Michael Delaney	
2017	Axis	Himself	Voice role
2021	Dating and New York	Cole	Also executive producer

=== Television ===
Year	Title	Role	Notes
2000	The King of Queens	Joey	Episode: "Strike Too"
2000	That's Life	Student #2	Episode: "The Tutor"
2000	City Guys	Delivery boy	Episode: "El-Brain"
2001	Maybe it's Me		Episode: "The Magic CD Episode"
2001–2002	Grounded for Life	Drew	2 episodes
2002	Leap of Faith	Kid	Episode: "Pilot"
2004	NYPD Blue	Danny Fatty Puglisi	Episode: "Chatty Chatty Bang Bang"
2004–2011	Entourage	Salvatore "Turtle" Assante	Main role; 96 episodes Co-wrote episodes: "Whiz Kid" and "The Big Bang"; Nominated – Screen Actors Guild Award for Outstanding Performance by an Ensemble in a Comedy Series (2009); Nominated – Screen Actors Guild Award for Outstanding Performance by an Ensemble in a Comedy Series (2008); Nominated – Screen Actors Guild Award for Outstanding Performance by an Ensemble in a Comedy Series (2007); Nominated – Teen Choice Award Choice TV: Sidekick (2007); Nominated – Teen Choice Award TV Choice Chemistry (shared w/ Adrian Grenier, Jeremy Piven, Kevin Dillon, and Kevin Connolly) (2006)
2011	Vietnam in HD	Raymond Torres	Main role; 6 episodes
2015–2020	Power	Joe Proctor	Recurring (season 2); Series regular (seasons 3–6) 48 episodes
2017	Shooter	Kirk Zehnder	Recurring (season 2); 4 episodes
2019–2020	A Million Little Things	Todd	2 episodes
2020	Sneakerheads	Himself	Episode: "The Match"
2022	Power Book II: Ghost	Joe Proctor	Episode: "A Fair Fight?"
