= Ari Gold (Entourage) =

- Entourage character
- First appearance: "Entourage" (2004)
- Last appearance: Entourage (2015)
- Portrayed by: Jeremy Piven

In-universe information
- Occupation: Co-founder, former Sr. Partner & Co-CEO of MGA (Miller/Gold Talent Agency) and former owner of TMA (Terrance McQuewick Agency)
- Spouse: Mrs. Melissa Gold (wife)
- Children: Sarah Gold (daughter); Jonah Gold (son)
- Home: Chicago, Illinois
- Education: Harvard University (AB); University of Michigan (JD/MBA) Ross School of Business

Ari Gold is a fictional character on the comedy-drama television series Entourage and its sequel film. He is played by Jeremy Piven.

== Biography ==
Ari Gold (born 1967) is a graduate from Harvard University and has a J.D./M.B.A. from the University of Michigan's Ross School of Business.

Ari is Jewish and has one brother, Howard. In spite of making multiple exaggerations of a sister, Ari also stated that he does not have a sister. Despite his position as one of the most powerful agents in Hollywood, Ari's aggressive and sometimes boorish behavior is frequently held in check by his wife (who is independently wealthy, having received a large inheritance from her father). Despite frequent sexual innuendos, Ari has never cheated on his wife since they married.

Ari and Eric Murphy are the primary influences in Vince's professional life. Due to their lifelong friendship, Vince follows Eric's advice much more than he does Ari's, despite Ari's wealth of experience. This leads to frequent verbal clashes between Eric and Ari. While neither particularly likes the other, they realize that they are in a marriage of necessity. But as time passes, they grow to have a mutual respect for one another, which eventually leads to them becoming friends with Ari mentoring Eric as he becomes a talent manager.

In season 1, Ari tries to get Vince to do a film called Matterhorn which he describes as being like, "Die Hard at Disneyland." Vince and Eric hate the script and are interested in an independent film - Queens Boulevard - that they've been introduced to by Ari's former assistant turned rival agent, Josh Weinstein.

Ari is angry that another agent is whispering in the ear of his client and discourages Vince from doing the film due to its small budget. Unmoved, Vince insists Ari lock down the movie. Ari later claims that he has received no offer from the producers, but Vince and Eric learn otherwise when they are invited to a beach party by Josh Weinstein. Panicked that he's about to lose Vince as a client, Ari abandons his son's birthday party to go talk to Vince and Eric at the beach. He confronts Josh Weinstein and humiliates him in front of his guests. Ari then finds Vince and admits that the offer came in and that he lied about it because he's trying to do what's best for Vince's career. He agrees to get the deal done provided that Vince's next movie is a big-budget studio project.

During most of season 2, Ari is fixated on getting Vince interested in doing Aquaman a mega-budget superhero action film being produced by Warner Bros. Vince balks at the offer, believing it's not his style, but Ari insists that Vince desperately needs to do a "commercially viable popcorn flick" in order to raise his profile in the wake of season 1's micro-budget indie flick, Queen's Boulevard. Vince resists the pressure of both Ari and Eric to do Aquaman until he finds out James Cameron has been tapped to direct. Vince tells Ari to lock down the film, only to find out that the role is no longer guaranteed for him as Cameron isn't familiar with Vince's work.

Ari arranges a meeting between Vince and Cameron but is accidentally undermined by Eric who simultaneously convinces Cameron to see Queen's Boulevard, which is premiering at the Sundance Film Festival. Cameron cancels the meeting, opting to view the film instead, leaving Ari angry with Eric. Cameron leaves the Queen's Boulevard screening 10 minutes into the film, and Ari is convinced Aquaman is lost. Shortly after, Ari calls Vince and conferences in Cameron who offers Vince the lead in Aquaman.

Toward the end of Season 2, Ari butts heads with Terrance McQuewick, the founding partner, and majority owner of the agency. Tensions boil over when Ari becomes convinced that Terrance is attempting to steal Vince as a client. Ari mentions an incident involving Bill & Ted's Excellent Adventure where Terrance quickly snatched up Keanu Reeves while handing Alex Winter over to Ari. After careful consideration, Ari realizes Terrance is going to attempt to force him out of the agency and attempts a coup of his own by organizing a clandestine lunch meeting with eight hand-picked fellow agents. The plan fails when Adam Davies (a rival agent), rats Ari out to Terrance, who quickly has all of his employees sign letters of commitment to his company. Ari has a brief mental breakdown but recovers after Lloyd delivers an inspirational speech and encourages Ari to move forward with his plan to open his own agency. At the end of season 2, Ari sets up a small boutique with five other agents working for him. Terrance and Ari eventually agree to a severance settlement of $11 million in return for Ari not suing Terrance for wrongful termination. Ari intends to use the money to open the largest agency in Hollywood, but word once again gets back to Terrance who makes it clear he will tie up the matter in prolonged court proceedings for years so that Ari will not have the money he needs to proceed with his plan. In the end, Ari's former mentor - and former boss before Terrance - Barbara "Babs" Miller makes a deal to partner with him to start a new agency. It ends up being called Miller Gold Talent Agency (MGA). Ari wryly observes that it sounds like the name of a beer company.

While Ari becomes preoccupied with the business of getting the new agency set up, his attention to Vince's career begins to wane. Their personal and professional relationship shatters at the end of the Season 3 Part 1 finale when Eric and Vince fire Ari due to his risky business move that ends up costing Vince the role of Joey Ramone in a biographical film documenting the story of legendary punk rock group The Ramones.

In the following episode, Ari has a friendly lunch with Vince and Eric, informing them that Vince's dream project, Medellin (the story of Colombian drug kingpin Pablo Escobar), is now available, but Vince's new agent Amanda informs him that this is not the case. Later that night at Vince's birthday party, Ari and Amanda squares off, but Ari backs off, knowing that he has planted doubt in Vince's mind. Vince decides not to accept any new projects until he is certain that Medellin is off the table.

During the 17th episode of Season 3, "Return of the King," Ari informs Vince that Medellin has officially become available. In spite of the fact that he is no longer Vince's agent, Ari tries his best to secure the lead role for Vince, but because it is Yom Kippur, the head of the studio (an elderly, Orthodox Jewish gentleman) refuses to discuss business matters, and eventually decides to shut down production on the film, entirely. Vince concludes that Amanda let the deal fall through because of their romantic relationship, since filming Medellin would have kept him busy for six months. The accusation causes Amanda to end their torrid love affair and drop Vince as a client. In the next episode The Resurrection, Vince rehires Ari as his agent, after Ari helps Vince and Eric secure the rights to produce Medellin themselves.

During Season 4, Ari tries hard to get Vince a job, but struggles to find offers due to the uncertainty surrounding the quality of Medellin. Eventually, the trailer for Medellin is leaked, inducing a flood of offers. The film they decide upon comes from an adaptation of a book Eric gave to Ari some time ago. It is seen as a potential blockbuster for Vincent; Ari goes to Dana Gordon to acquire the role only to find that Heath Ledger has already been cast as the lead. Ari convinces Heath Ledger to drop out after pointing out that he recently did Brokeback Mountain and that this new film has similar homoerotic undertones, which could damage Ledger's status as a budding sex symbol. However, the intended director drops out as well. Ari, in a last-ditch effort, sells Dana Gordon the "Medellin Dream Team" of star Vincent Chase, producer Eric Murphy, and director Billy Walsh. Billy gets a half million-dollar commission to adapt the screenplay but ends up writing an entirely original screenplay instead. Ari and Dana reluctantly team up to convince the studio head to greenlight Billy's new project, SILO, which Vince believes will be excellent.

In the Season 4 season finale, Ari is confident they will receive multiple competing offers from studios who wish to distribute Medellin but runs into trouble when financier Nick Rubenstein, desperate to get his money back, demands that Ari sell the film before its screening, in case it ends up being terrible. Initially, the only such offer comes from Yair Marx, a wealthy foreign businessman who has just launched a film distribution company based out of Dubai. Nick wants to accept Yair's offer of $30 million, which would recoup the film's budget, but Ari and Billy balk at the offer as they want to sell to a "real studio" who will be able to properly promote the film and generate potential Oscar buzz. Hours before the screening, Ari and Eric are able to convince Dana Gordon to match Yair's $30 million offer, only to find that Nick has already agreed to sell the film to Yair for $75 million. After the screening, the crowd at Cannes boos it and hastily exits the theater. Dana thanks Ari for not selling her the film, saying it's probably the one nice thing he's ever done for her. Yair points out that he never signed anything to make the deal official, and immediately drops his offer. Eventually Harvey Weingard buys the film for $1. Ari is confident that Harvey can fix the film.

In Season 5, no offers are coming in for Vince after Medellin gets a direct-to-video release. Ari informs a shaken Vince that he has been placed in "movie jail" after his mega-hyped film turned out to be a bomb. Ari expresses confidence to Vince of a looming comeback, but later confides in Mark Wahlberg that Vince's chances are only 50/50.

After a series of meetings with every studio in town ends with no one wanting to cast Vince as a lead in anything, Vince asks Ari about the possibility of pursuing a supporting role in a new big-budget film called Smoke Jumpers, a script that Eric found with Edward Norton attached as the lead. Ari attempts to secure the second lead for Vince but finds out that the film has become property of Warner Bros., a studio that refuses to hire Vince after Vince demanded $20 million to do the Aquaman sequel and was subsequently fired from the franchise.

Ari arranges to play golf with WB studio head Alan Gray in an effort to "bet" Vince into the film by hustling Alan at golf only to find that Alan has significantly improved his game after taking private lessons from Phil Mickelson. After Ari loses his wager, Alan, furious at Ari for even bringing up Vince's name, suffers a fatal heart attack. Shortly thereafter, Ari is offered the chance to succeed him by the studio's chairman John Ellis for $10 million. Ari is not sure what to do: if he takes the job, he could give Vince any role he wanted with the studio, but it would also mean that he couldn't be Vince's agent, which could also end their friendship. He decides to turn the job down, but then he learns that Amanda Daniels - who still holds a grudge against Vince and Ari - is next in line for the job. Ari attempts to make peace with her, offering to put his full support behind her for the job as long as she agrees to add Vince as the second lead in Smoke Jumpers. Saying that Vince isn't good enough, she refuses, adding that, "Ari can kiss his relationship with the studio goodbye." Ari then declares that he will accept the job to spite her, but instead convinces John Ellis to give the position to Dana Gordon. Not only does this guaranteed Vince the second lead in Smoke Jumpers but it also repairs his relationship with Dana, which had suffered considerable damage after the fallout over Medellin and SILO.

While Vince begins work on Smoke Jumpers, Ari meets with Andrew Klein, an old colleague and friend during Ari's days working as an assistant to Terrance and at Jim Oliver's agency. When, early in his career, Ari had been ready to give up being an agent and go back to Chicago to become a lawyer, Andrew had convinced Ari to stay in Hollywood. When the partnership at the agency between Terrance and Oliver broke up, Ari went with Terrance, but Andrew went with Oliver, who wound up ripping off his clients and employees. As a result, Klein's status as a rising star was halted, while Ari went on to great success under Terrence. Andrew needs a $500,000 loan from Ari as the Hollywood writer's strike has left his agency cash-poor. Lloyd appraises Andrew's business and informs Ari that Andrew is very successful and would be able to pay back the loan in a mere 90 days. Rather than give Andrew the loan, Ari convinces him to sell his agency to Ari and take the position as head of the Miller Gold Agency's TV division. Unfortunately, Ari's partner, Babs, disagrees with Ari's buyout plan believing Andrew Klein to be "a loser". Ari convinces Babs to meet with Andrew only to have Andrew suffer a panic attack during the meeting and flee the conference room. Babs reiterates her belief that Klein can't handle the pressure of working for a big agency. In retaliation for her refusal to support Ari's buyout, Ari publicly humiliates Babs at a luncheon honoring her and other powerful women in Hollywood. Babs finally agrees to the purchase of Andrew Klein's agency but tells Ari that any losses from the purchase will come out of Ari's pocket. However, Klein proves to be a profitable entity as he starts signing major writer/producer clients.

At the end of season 5, things take a bad turn as Vince is being deliberately phased out of Smoke Jumpers by the emotionally volatile director, Verner Vollstedt, who doesn't believe Vince has any real talent. The director eventually fires Vince and Ari arrives on the set to inform him that he has no authority to fire anyone, threatening to go directly to the studio if Verner doesn't continue to do the movie with Vince. The studio decides to shut down production altogether, leaving Vince broke and unemployed. He returns to his mother's home in Queens where Ari tracks him down several days later and puts Vince in touch with Martin Scorsese, who offers Vince the lead role of Nick Carraway in The Great Gatsby.

During season 6, with Vince successfully back at the top of the A-list, Ari attends to internal business at the agency where Andrew Klein is suffering an emotional breakdown stemming from an affair he is having with a young female agent, Lizzie Grant. Ari counsels Andrew to put the affair behind him and to think about his children and how he wants to be perceived by them. Andrew misunderstands Ari's advice and ends his marriage. The next day, Lizzie ends the affair with Andrew who has had his financial accounts frozen by his wife, leaving him homeless and penniless. Ari discovers Andrew asleep on the sofa in Ari's office and is apoplectic over the unprofessional display. Andrew has a meeting later that day with famed film/TV writer Aaron Sorkin, who hates Ari but is nevertheless considering signing on as a client of the Miller Gold Agency because he likes Andrew. Ari tells Andrew that he had better get the deal done. Andrew ends up in jail after a domestic dispute with his jilted wife but is nevertheless able to sign Sorkin who is sympathetic because he too went through an ugly divorce.

Meanwhile, Lloyd is offered an opportunity to become an agent by Adam Davies. He initially refuses, but eventually becomes fed up with Ari's constant verbal abuse and accepts Davies' offer to return to TMA. Shortly after, Terrance approaches Ari with an offer to buy out his agency. After a great deal of arguing, Terrance and Ari make peace and the deal goes through. After completing the deal, Ari gets revenge on many of his enemies as he storms through TMA, paintballing all of the agents he's firing. Lloyd successfully hides from Ari, who demands that Lloyd return and swear loyalty to him and apologize in order to keep his job. Lloyd confronts Ari in his office and accuses Ari of taking advantage of him. Ari, having already had an epiphany after receiving an apology from Terrence, apologizes to Lloyd and reveals that he has an office waiting for him to go with his promotion to full agent.

In season 7, Ari has become the biggest agent in the world after the buyout of Terrence's agency. He attempts to acquire the right to negotiate the NFL's television rights (with the help of Lizzie Grant) but is caught off guard when the NFL instead offers to have him become the owner of a Los Angeles-based NFL franchise. Caught up in the moment, Ari dances with Lizzie in his office just as Ari's wife walks in. She later asks Ari to fire Lizzie for what she had done to Ari's now former employee Andrew Klein. Meanwhile, Lizzie asks to be in charge of the television division, in the wake of Andrew's departure. Ari says that she isn't ready. Frustrated, Lizzie quits and works to take down Ari after she is hired by Amanda Daniels, who is still holding a grudge for preventing her from becoming the studio head at Warner Bros. News is leaked to the press regarding how Ari treats his employees, so he tries to patch things up with everyone to no avail. The NFL withdraws its offer to Ari after the bad press but is reassured when Amanda vouches for him. However, before she can tell Ari, Ari confronts her and publicly humiliates her at a fancy restaurant in front of his wife. Amanda then reveals that the NFL was going to renew their offer to Ari. Mortified and humiliated by Ari's actions, Ari's wife leaves him in the final episode as he tries to throw her a surprise birthday party.

In season 8 Ari is separated from his wife (who is now dating celebrity chef Bobby Flay), and – after an awkward date with a much younger woman – visits Dana Gordon and the two rekindle their decades-old romantic relationship. The morning after, Dana appears happy but is disheartened when Ari tells her that he has a marriage counseling session with his wife that day. That night Ari takes Dana out to dinner at Bobby Flay's restaurant in an effort to make his wife jealous. Dana, furious at being used, walks out on Ari.

Ari tries to avoid Dana, but this proves impossible as Dana has to go to Ari's office on business. While there, she meets Ari's children, including his son Jonah, who asks her, "Are you the Dana our mom hates?" Dana feels humiliated despite maintaining that she has done nothing wrong. Ari admits to the situation being complicated, and that he isn't sure what to do. That night, Ari's wife informs Ari that she is officially filing for divorce. Later that night, Ari drunkenly calls Dana, who agrees to continue seeing him.

Ari visits his wife in one last attempt to save their marriage, only to find Flay in his house. Flay calls her “Melissa” revealing her name to the audience for the first time as she was previously known only as “Mrs. Ari”. Overcome with jealousy and rage, Ari accuses her of being dishonest with him about the nature of her relationship with Flay and storms out.

In the penultimate episode of the series, Ari continues to date Dana, who hints that she is interested in starting a family. Ari confesses that he still loves his wife and the two agree to end their romance but maintain their professional relationship. Dana is visibly heartbroken, and this marks her final appearance on the series. In the series finale, Ari informs Barbara of his immediate and permanent resignation from the agency, in order to spend time with his wife traveling around the world. During the closing credits of the final episode, the screen cuts to a shot of Ari and his wife relaxing on holiday. As his wife walks away, Ari receives a phone call from John Ellis asking Ari to replace him as chairman and CEO of Time Warner. Ari is stunned by the offer and does not reveal the nature of the phone call to his wife, concluding with him contemplating the offer.

In the 2015 film, it's revealed that Ari accepted the job offer but only as a studio-head below John Ellis after the CEO changed his mind after retiring. Despite this, Ari is now in full control of presenting projects for Vince to star in without being his agent and offers him the leading role in a modern-reimagining film of Jekyll & Hyde, under the title Hyde. Vince accepts but only if he is allowed to direct, which Ari allows despite being extremely worried, due to Vince's inexperience behind the camera. His worries are seemingly warranted as Vince refuses to let anyone see the film at a press screening and is over-budget due to needing an extra $10 million to finish. This also adds to his stress, which in turn affects his relationship with his wife, though couples counseling is somewhat helping. However, Ari's worries are put to rest after seeing a cut of the film and loving it.

But his efforts to get the extra $10 million are blocked when the main producer of the movie, Larsen McCredle, sends his son, Travis, to observe the production and watch the cut of the movie, which he claims to dislike due to Vince's performance, and demands that Vince is removed as the lead actor and director. Looking into the situation, Ari discovers that Travis is really doing this because Vince is dating Emily Ratajkowski, whom he is infatuated with. Ari presents this to John Ellis and the other studio heads, as well as Larsen, who agrees to allow the extra $10 million to go throw to finish the movie but only if Ari is removed from the company, due to disrespecting his son. Realizing he was going to be fired and that it was the only way to see the movie complete, Ari resigns from his position and waives his severance pay for a backend deal for the grosses from Hyde.

Months later, Hyde is a box office success and Ari's investment pays off, allowing him to fully retire and strengthen his relationship with his wife and kids. He is present when the film wins several awards at the Golden Globe Awards, including one for Johnny Drama. He later gives his former assistant Lloyd away at his wedding and joins Vince, E, Turtle, Drama and even Billy Walsh for some drinks, where an idea is presented to make a movie or TV series about their lives and journey to the top of Hollywood, which, Ari comments, is a bad idea.

== Inspiration ==
Ari's character is based in part on the real-life Hollywood agent Ari Emanuel, who broke away from mega-agency ICM to form the Endeavor Talent Agency, which represents such stars as Vin Diesel and Larry David, both of whom are represented on the show by the fictional Ari Gold. Likewise, both Emanuel and Gold represent series producer Mark Wahlberg, upon whose experiences in Hollywood the series is loosely based. Ari Emanuel also once represented Jeremy Piven himself, and in an interview on the special features of the Season 3 Part 2 DVD, Entourage creator Doug Ellin says that Ari Emanuel demanded the "Ari Gold" part be cast to Piven and wouldn't accept anyone else to play him. Ari Gold, in the episode 'Playin with Fire' says that director Peter Berg was his roommate in college, as was Emanuel's.

Ari Emanuel is the brother of Ezekiel Emanuel—a bioethicist—and Rahm Emanuel—former mayor of Chicago, former White House Chief of Staff, and member of the United States House of Representatives.

== Ari Gold book ==
The Gold Standard: Rules to Rule By, by Ari Gold is a memoir and self-help guide "that's about as legitimate and motivational as any book written by a fictitious character can get." Published by Hachette Books, the book is framed around 18 rules (including "Either You Know It All or You Blow it All" and "Keep a Scorecard for Favors") with accompanying anecdotes about how Gold discovered, developed and/or follows his own rules. Contently Magazine described it as "possibly the greatest piece of cross-marketing ever." An Amazon bestseller, the book was written by Joey Boukadakis, Jake Greene, and Doug Ellin.

== Former clients and associates ==
List of Ari Gold's associates at MGA, the "Miller/Gold Agency" (officially opened in season 3, episode 8):

- Barbara "Babs" Miller (Sr. Partner, Co-CEO & Co-founder)
- Andrew Klein (Partner, Former Head of Television Department, stated in season 7, episode 2, that he left for sexual addiction rehab)
- Lloyd Lee (Former assistant to Ari Gold, now Head of Television Department and Sr. Partner alongside Babs)
- Lizzy Grant (Former junior Agent in the Television Department)

Former clients of Ari Gold, both real and fictional celebrities:

- Vincent Chase
- Justine Chapin
- Nick Rubenstein
- Bob Ryan
- Billy Walsh
- Mary J. Blige
- Gary Busey
- Gwyneth Paltrow
- Sydney Pollack
- Eric Roberts
- Jon Cryer
- Jeffrey Tambor
- Johnny Drama
- Melinda Clarke
- Queen Latifah
- Mark Wahlberg
- Eva Longoria
- Lindsay Lohan
- Larry David
- Vin Diesel
- Bow Wow
- Richard Kelly
- Richard Schiff
- Rob Reiner
- M. Night Shyamalan
- James Woods
- Leonardo DiCaprio
- Hugh Jackman
- Jessica Biel
- Sharon Stone
- T.I.
- Zac Efron
- Matt Damon
- David Schwimmer
- Nick Cassavetes
- Ryan Reynolds
- Mike Tyson
- Jessica Simpson
- Aaron Sorkin
