= Eric Murphy (Entourage) =

Eric "E" Murphy
- First appearance: "Entourage" July 18, 2004
- Last appearance: Entourage June 3, 2015
- Portrayed by: Kevin Connolly

In-universe information
- Alias: E
- Occupation: Owner of Murphy Lavin Group. Formerly Talent Manager at Murray Berenson Co. And Owner of The Murphy Group (talent management co.)
- Relatives: Mom and Dad
- Home: Queens, New York

Eric "E" Murphy is a fictional character on the comedy-drama television series Entourage and its film sequel. He is played by Kevin Connolly.

== Fictional production filmography ==
Year	Title	Role	Notes
Medellin	2007	Producer	The film was produced by Vince, Eric Murphy, and Nick Rubenstein, who all helped fund the film as well. The indie film premiered at the 2007 Cannes Film Festival to very negative critical responses, and was later bought for just $1 and went direct-to-DVD.

== Fictional character biography ==
Eric, Vince Chase's best friend since they were six, works as Vince's manager. Vince credits Eric for pushing him to become an actor when they were in the third grade. At Vince's request, Eric moved to Los Angeles from Queens, where he was working as a night manager at a Sbarro pizzeria. (When asked what he used to do before coming to Los Angeles, Eric often euphemistically replies that he "managed an Italian restaurant.") Feeling the increasing pressures outside of just acting, Vince wanted his best friend to help him with business and logistical decisions.

Vince often says that Eric knows him better than anyone else; Rita Chase becomes known as Eric's "other mother". Eric is Catholic and of Irish descent and is reputed to have been a tough guy in his youth.

In season one, Eric serves informally as Vince's manager. In the first-season finale, Eric insists on formalizing the relationship; Vince gives E a ten percent commission, plus health benefits. While this new financial bias could potentially skew Eric's actions, his devotion to his best friend transcends the money. This often puts him at odds with Vince's more avaricious agent, Ari Gold, but the two of them are willing to co-exist for Vince's sake. Although not a Hollywood insider, Eric strives to become a seasoned manager. Eric hates being referred to as a "Suit" especially by Billy Walsh. Ari and Eric are capable of seeing eye to eye on issues like Vince doing "Aquaman" and keeping his behavior from ruining the film. Their difficult relationship eventually becomes a friendship, as Ari advises Eric on navigating his way through the business.

Since then, Eric has been busy expanding his job function, getting an office and, even starting "The Murphy Group". He has also finally been recognized as Vincent Chase's manager, thanks to an exposé on him in Daily Variety. He briefly signed Anna Faris as a client before being fired for a conflict of interests regarding Billy and Vince's third movie(though this is only implied, we never actually see him fired, and later on in the series he tells Ari that he "has 3 clients"). In the Season 4 season finale, Eric ends up correct about Medellin after repeatedly mentioning that the film was overly long (among other problems) and needed a lot of work before it was released at Cannes. With Yair backing out after seeing how poorly it was received by the viewers at the screening, the film is ultimately sold to Harvey Weingard (a producer based on Harvey Weinstein) for a back-door price of one dollar. Noticing the gang's disappointment walking out of the theater, Ari does his best to lighten the mood by saying Harvey is the man they want to pull them out of the hole, adding: "You should've seen Shakespeare in Love before he put his Scissorhands on it."

In Season 5, Eric manages Charlie Williams, an up-and-coming stand-up comedian turned actor, who is played by Shad Moss. During season 5, Eric helps land Charlie a spot on a new TV series called Venice about skateboarders living around Venice Beach, California.

During the first episode of Season 6, Eric moves out of Vince's house and into a house that he watches for a year for a friend of Sloan, the daughter of Ari's former partner at the agency. Later on in the season, Eric closes his talent agency for good and eventually takes a job offer at Hollywood's most powerful management group with well-known talent manager Murray Berenson at Murray Berenson Company with Eric regularly clashing with colleague Scott Lavin (Scott Caan).

At the end of Season 7, E aids Lavin in a takeover of Murray's company after discovering that Murray was reporting to Terrence about Eric's own work performance. This rebellion presumably outs Murray and also shuts down the Murray Berenson Company for good with Eric and Lavin later going into partnership to form the Murphy Lavin Group.

Unlike the rest of the entourage, Eric tends to pursue lasting relationships with women, although he is not above the occasional one-night stand. He briefly dated Ari's assistant, Emily. He spent much of season one and part of season two working through a relationship with his girlfriend, Kristen, that ended after she admitted that she cheated while he was in New York filming Queens Boulevard. In seasons two and three, Eric dated Sloan. At the beginning of season four, Eric says that he and Sloan are "on a break", although it is revealed later in the season that they have indeed broken up and that Sloan has moved on.

At the end of Season 6, Eric realizes Sloan is the only one he wants to be with and he proposes to her. Sloan realizes he is ready to commit to a relationship and they become engaged. Eventually, they break up again after Eric gets insulted by his future father-in-law Terrence in trying to be forced to sign a prenup before his wedding. This angers Eric that his father-in-law would believe he is only marrying Sloan for her money, causing Eric to agree with Scott Lavin's plan to work together to take over Murray's Talent Management Agency.

After some time, Eric is told that Sloan is pregnant. Thanks to Vince, the couple reconcile by flying away in a private jet together while Vince and the others head to Paris for Vince's wedding. The day-to-day running of the Murphy Lavin Group is presumably being left in Lavin's hands although Eric promises to tell Lavin everything when he gets back.

In the Entourage film, Eric and Sloan have again broken up but reconcile after the birth of their child. Eric helps find Vince additional funding for his directorial debut, Hyde. By the end of the film, Sloan and E have vowed to give their relationship another chance upon giving birth to a baby girl, Ryan Murphy.

== Inspiration ==
The Eric Murphy character was based on Mark's friend Eric Weinstein who is also an executive producer .

== Clients ==
List of Eric's clients/employees signed to his management co. "The Murphy Group" (officially opened in season 4, episode 8 and officially closed in season 6, episode 4)

Personal Assistants: While at Murphy Group

- Jane (Season 5 to Season 6 Episode 4)

While at Murray Berenson's Management Company

- Brittany (Season 6 Episode 7 - end of Season 6), played by Kate Mara
- Jennie (Season 7–8) (also assistant at Murphy-Lavin Group), played by Janet Montgomery

Current Clients:

- Johnny "Drama" Chase
- Vincent Chase
- Melinda Clarke
- Bob Saget
- Billy Walsh
- L.B. and Nick (Writers of 9 Brave Souls which was later renamed Smokejumpers)

Former Clients:

- Anna Faris
- Johnny Galecki
- Charlie Williams
