= Vincent Chase =

- Entourage character
- First appearance: "Entourage" (2004)
- Last appearance: Entourage (2015)
- Based on: Life of Mark Wahlberg
- Portrayed by: Adrian Grenier

In-universe information
- Full name: Vincent Chase
- Nickname: Vince
- Occupation: Actor, Director
- Relatives: Rita Chase (mother); Johnny "Drama" Chase (half-brother)
- Home: Queens, New York City, New York, U.S.

Vincent "Vince" Chase is the protagonist of the comedy-drama television series Entourage and its film sequel, based on the series' executive producer Mark Wahlberg. He is played by Adrian Grenier.

== Character biography ==
=== Backstory ===
Vincent Chase grew up in Queens, New York, along with neighborhood friends Eric, Turtle, Dom, and Cara. Vince's older brother, Johnny "Drama" Chase, is also an actor and has been living in Hollywood for at least twelve years, but with considerably less success. By the end of the series, Vince is around 33 years old; his 28th birthday serves the main storyline in the season 3 episode "Less Than 30".

Throughout the series, Vince talks about how he and his entourage are "living the life" after growing up with little money, at one point saying, "I came from nothing, and as much as I like the toys, I really don't need them" when told that offers for him are drying up. He is eager to share the financial and social spoils of his current stardom with them, who he thinks of as his family. In return, they prove to be the ones he can depend on through thick and thin.

=== Fictional career ===
Vince begins his acting career when he moves to Los Angeles, booking a Mentos commercial shortly after signing with talent agent Ari Gold. His first film role included scenes with Mandy Moore in A Walk To Remember. Vince's first starring role, which led to his breakout, was in 2004s Head On. Following Head On's success, Vince opts to star in up and comer Billy Walsh's Queens Boulevard, against the advice of his agent. Queens Boulevard wins the Grand Jury Prize at Sundance, which results in him booking the lead in James Cameron's Aquaman, which goes on to break Spider-Man's record for the best opening weekend box office numbers of all time. Vince then drops out of Aquaman 2 upon learning it would not be directed by James Cameron. Vince then pursues his dream role of Pablo Escobar in the bio-pic Medellín at the cost of several other opportunities and his relationships with his representation. After troubled development, the film ends up being produced by Vince himself and flops critically and financially despite over-the-top hype leading up to its premiere at Cannes. Vince's next project, Smoke Jumpers, fails to regain his star power, but its footage lands him a lead role (Nick Carraway) in Martin Scorsese's adaptation of The Great Gatsby set in the 1980s. Gatsby's massive success lands Vince more work and several other roles. Vince is almost killed doing a dangerous driving stunt for an action film, "Ferrari," and the resulting trauma fuels drug and alcohol addiction. Vince undergoes court-ordered rehab for 90 days following an arrest for cocaine possession, which occurred after he punched Eminem at a party at the Hollywood Roosevelt Hotel. Having regained confidence, he repairs his friendships while rehabilitating his image after a public fall from grace. In the Entourage film, Vince eventually rises to the top with the success of Hyde despite going over budget. Having established himself as an actor and as a director, he no longer has to worry about proving himself to get by. By the end of the film, Vince agrees to make a movie or a series about their lives and journey to success.

=== Fictional filmography ===
==== Films ====
Year	Title	Role	Notes
2002	A Walk to Remember	Small Supp. Role	Had an on-set relationship with lead actress Mandy Moore.
2004	Head On	Co-Lead	A Crime-Thriller/Mystery film. Co-starred with Jessica Alba. Released/produced by "20th Century FOX, Film Studio." Earned a salary of $2,000,000 for his role.
2005	Queens Boulevard	Lead Role	An Indie Drama set in Queens, New York. Co-starred with Ethan Suplee, Zooey Deschanel, and Robert Duvall. The first film Vince did with director Billy Walsh. Produced by Scott Wick. Premiered at the 2005 Sundance Film Festival to very positive responses. Vince and Billy later blocked the film's national release due to a major change the studio made to the original cut (neon re-colorization). Later released on DVD. Paid a salary of $60,000 before taxes and commissions.
2006	Aquaman	Arthur Curry/Aquaman	Directed by James Cameron. Written by Andrew Kevin Walker. Co-starred with Mandy Moore as Aquagirl, James Woods, Ray Liotta and Sharon Stone. Vince got the role of Aquaman thanks to James Cameron seeing his performance in Queens Boulevard. Beat Spiderman's opening weekend box office record by grossing $116 million, going on to become the highest-grossing film of all time. Released/produced by Warner Brothers.
2007	Medellín	Pablo Escobar	This movie is the true story of Pablo Escobar's rise and fall. Directed by Billy Walsh. Produced by Vince, his best friend/manager Eric Murphy and Nicky Rubenstein. Premiered at the 2007 Cannes Film Festival to extremely negative responses. Bought by Harvey Weingard for $1. Ends up as direct-to-DVD. "Welcome to the Jungle", a documentary about the making of Medellín, was also filmed.
-	Smoke Jumpers (unfinished)	Ray McCabe	About 9 firefighters battling "The Greatest Forest Fire in Oregon History." Co-starred with Edward Norton, Jason Patric, and Brian Van Holt. Directed by Verner Vollstedt. Scripted by first time writers Lawrence Baird and Nick Maser. Cancelled mid-production due to budgeting issues and on-set tensions between Vince and Vollstedt. Was to be released/produced by "Warner Bros. Pictures, Film Studio." The reported production budget was $120 million.
2009	Gatsby	Nick Carraway	Re-imagining of F. Scott Fitzgerald's novel, The Great Gatsby, set in modern-day New York City. Directed by Martin Scorsese. Produced by Gus Van Sant. Filmed in New York City. This was Vince's comeback film. It was because of the few scenes filmed during the production of Smoke Jumpers that Vince was able to land this role. The film opened at No. 1 at the box office grossing $37 million in its opening weekend.
2010	Ferrari	Enzo Ferrari	A bio-pic about the Italian race car driver, inventor, and founder of the Ferrari car manufacturer, Enzo Ferrari. Directed by Frank Darabont. Filming was initially pushed back 3 months. Scheduled for released on September 24, 2010.
2010	Madagascar Sequel	Benji (voice only)	Fictional Sequel
2011	The Takeover	TBA	Action film directed by Nick Cassavetes. Vince performed some of his own stunts in this film.
2013	Air-Walker	Lead role	Based on comic book property by Stan Lee. Written and directed by Randall Wallace. Currently in negotiations. Reportedly will be paid $12,000,000 along with a percentage of the gross revenue for his role. Randall Wallace dropped out as director after Vince refused a drug test that he and the studio request. Wallace was then replaced by Peter Berg. Film was put on hold until Vince completed 90-day court-mandated rehab. Begins shooting in March 2012 in Europe. Scheduled for a Summer 2013 release. However, Vince dropped out of the film a month before production was to begin due to having second thoughts about the script.
2015	Hyde	Jekyll/Hyde	Also director; nominated for two Golden Globes: Best Actor and Best Director

==== Television ====
Year	Title	Role	Notes
-	Vicks (Television Commercial)	-	Shauna: "I can't believe that all of this started from a Vicks commercial!" (while touring Vince's [formerly Marlon Brando's] new mansion he had just purchased).
-	Mentos (Television Commercial)	-	This is the commercial in which Ari Gold first "noticed" Vincent's star potential. Ari signed him shortly after.
-	JAG (1 episode)	Guest Role	His first job as a client of Ari Gold. Ari did not take a commission on Vince's $668.
-	Live with Regis and Kelly	Himself	Appeared as a Special Guest on the show and "tanked" after pulling an all-nighter.
2004	Jimmy Kimmel Live!	Himself	Appeared as a Special Guest on the show to promote Head On.
2005	Chinese Energy Drink (Television Commercial)	-	Vince was paid $500,000 for this commercial. Never to be seen in the United States. Directed by fictional Chinese filmmaker Chang Chung.
2009	The Tonight Show with Jay Leno	Himself	Appeared as a Special Guest on the show to promote Gatsby.

== Development ==
Entourage executive producer Mark Wahlberg named the character after legendary Hollywood acting teacher Vincent Chase, with whom Wahlberg became friends while working on the 1997 Bill Paxton film Traveller. However, the character of Vincent Chase is a Marty Stu based on Mark Wahlberg himself. Wahlberg has achieved Hollywood success similar to the fictional success of Vincent.. Walt Hickey of FiveThirtyEight has argued that the career of Vincent Chase most closely matches that of Tobey Maguire. Series creator Doug Ellin has also mentioned that the character of Vince has touches of Tobey Maguire in terms of storyline, Leonardo DiCaprio in terms of personality, and Wahlberg in terms of lifestyle.
