= Turtle (Entourage) =

- Entourage character
- First appearance: "Entourage" July 18, 2004
- Last appearance: Entourage June 3, 2015
- Portrayed by: Jerry Ferrara

In-universe information
- Full name: Salvatore Assante
- Nickname: Turtle
- Occupation: Entrepreneur, Driver, Personal Assistant to Vincent Chase
- Significant others: Jamie-Lynn Sigler (ex-girlfriend); Alex (ex-girlfriend)
- Relatives: Mother, Cousin Ronnie, Uncle Carmine, Cousin Cory

Salvatore "Turtle" Assante is a fictional character central to the narrative of the American comedy-drama television series Entourage, which aired from 2004 to 2011 on HBO, and its 2015 film sequel. Created by Doug Ellin, the series offers a satirical glimpse into the life of a young A-list movie star and his childhood friends as they navigate the complexities of Hollywood's social and professional labyrinths.

== Fictional biography ==
In the television series "Entourage," Turtle, portrayed by Jerry Ferrara, is a character originally from Queens, New York, who is a childhood friend of the protagonist, Vincent Chase. Turtle's role in the series diverges from other main characters, as he is not initially involved in the Hollywood entertainment industry. Instead, he acts as Vincent's driver and manages various household tasks, providing a contrast to the glamorous Hollywood lifestyle depicted in the show.

Turtle's character is characterized by a laid-back demeanor and unwavering loyalty to his friends. Although he does not seek the spotlight, his practical knowledge of street culture and his optimistic approach are integral in helping the group handle the complexities of life in Hollywood. Throughout the series, Turtle also explores personal interests that define his identity, such as fashion and pop culture, demonstrated by his collection of rare sneakers and stylish sportswear. This not only showcases his personal style but also occasionally influences the narrative, as his cultural insights and connections become valuable.

Turtle's development over the series reflects a growth from a background supporter to a more rounded character with his own ambitions and challenges, contributing depth to the ensemble cast and adding a layer of realism to the portrayal of friendship and ambition in the context of Hollywood.

Over the series, Turtle's character undergoes significant development. From his humble beginnings as Vincent's driver, he evolves into an entrepreneur, venturing into business with a tequila brand and later into the restaurant industry. His relationships, particularly with Jamie-Lynn Sigler and Brooke Manning, serve as catalysts for personal growth, affecting his confidence, ambitions, and sense of self-worth.

Turtle's journey from a supportive friend to a successful businessman illustrates themes of loyalty, friendship, and the pursuit of personal dreams outside the shadow of more prominent figures. His Sicilian-American heritage and background as a bookie are elements that add depth to his character, providing insights into his motivations and actions throughout the series.

The narrative arc of Turtle in "Entourage" exemplifies the importance of secondary characters in television series, showcasing how they can offer alternative perspectives on the central themes of fame, success, and friendship in Hollywood. Turtle's character contributes a grounding, relatable presence amidst the show's depiction of the glamorous yet challenging lifestyle of the entertainment industry.

== Interests ==
Turtle demonstrates a fondness for luxury vehicles throughout the series. In Season 1, he convinces Vince to lease a 2004 Rolls-Royce Phantom. From then on, he primarily drives a yellow 2003 Hummer H2, which was given to Dom as a severance package in Season 3. Turtle frequently opts for upscale SUVs as his preferred mode of transportation, including a 2002 Cadillac Escalade in the pilot episode, as well as 2004, 2006, 2007, and 2008 Cadillac Escalade ESVs.

On his 30th birthday in Season 6, Vince presents Turtle with a 2009 Ferrari California, while his girlfriend Jamie-Lynn Sigler gifts him a 2009 Porsche 911 convertible, featuring personalized "Turtle" license plates. In Season 6, the 2008 Cadillac Escalade ESV is replaced with a 2009 Cadillac Escalade Hybrid. Subsequently, in Season 7, the Escalade Hybrid gives way to a 2010 Cadillac Escalade Platinum. In the final season, Turtle's primary choice of transportation is a 2011 Cadillac Escalade ESV.

== Character name ==
Turtle's real name is revealed to the audience only once during the first five seasons. In Season 5, Episode 11, he discloses his name to actress Jamie-Lynn Sigler, whom he is starting a relationship with, stating that his name is Sal. Furthermore, in Season 6, Episode 2, Turtle mentions during an interview that he allowed Jamie to call him Sal, but she is the only one permitted to do so. In the season 8 finale, Turtle suggests to E and Sloan that if their baby is a boy, they should consider naming him Sal. While the last name "Vacara" appeared on the TV quiz show Jeopardy! without a provided source, Jerry Ferrara, the actor who portrays Turtle, confirms that Sal's last name is Assante. Ferrara requested that Turtle's real name be "Sal" as a tribute to his late friend Sal Assante, who died in 2002.

== Inspiration ==
The character Turtle in Entourage was inspired by Mark Wahlberg's real-life assistant, Donnie "Donkey" Carroll, who died on December 18, 2005, at the age of 39 due to an asthma attack. During Carroll's tenure as Wahlberg's personal assistant, which lasted 14 years, he also pursued a rap music career under the stage name Murda One. While Carroll had a disagreement with Wahlberg regarding compensation for the use of his life story in Entourage, they maintained their friendship. Carroll claimed that Wahlberg had not paid him for the appropriation, despite compensating others.
