= Kevin Connolly (actor) =

American actor (born 1974)

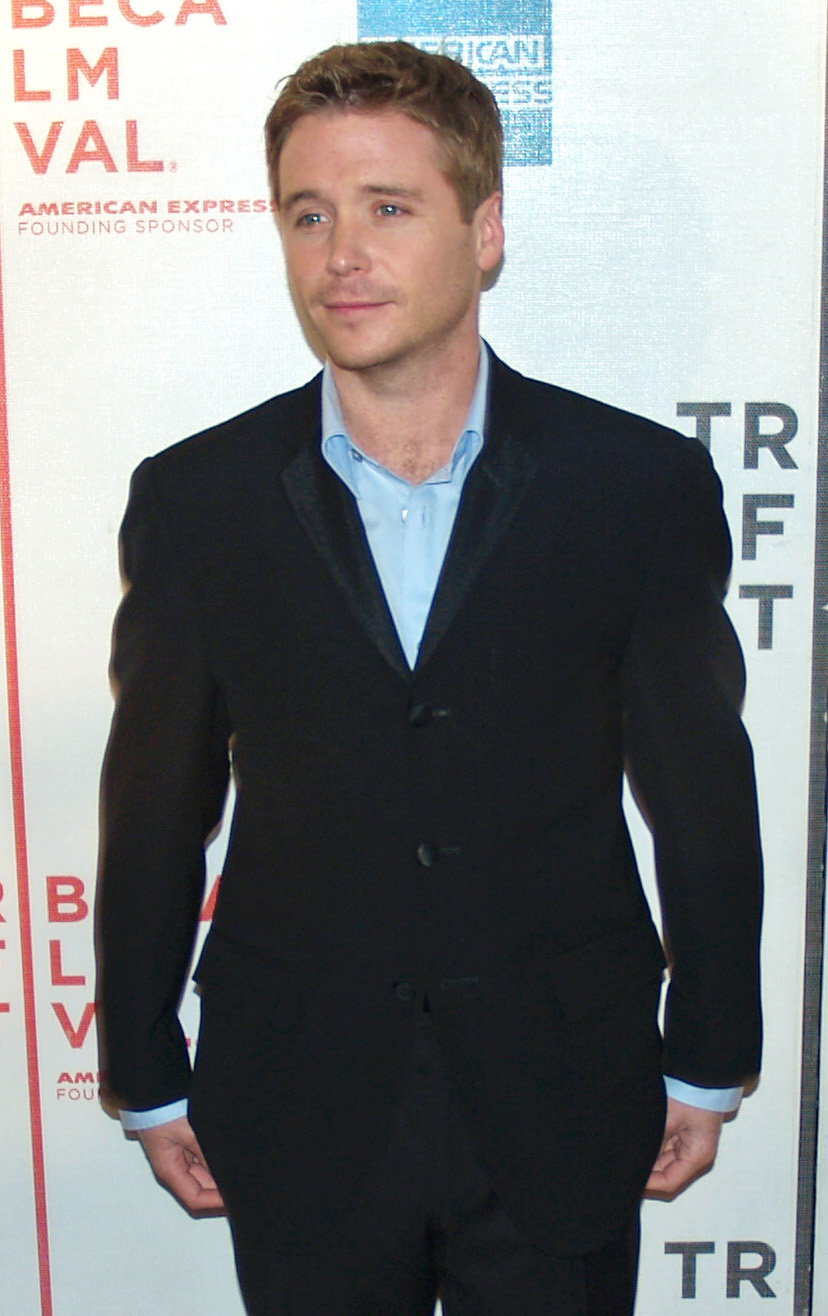
- Connolly at the 2007 Tribeca Film Festival
- Born: March 5, 1974 (age 52); New York State, U.S. (Note: either in New York City or Patchogue, New York (sources differ))
- Occupations: Actor; director; producer
- Years active: 1990–present
- Partner: Zulay Henao (2019–present)
- Children: 1

Kevin Connolly (born March 5, 1974) is an American actor and director. He is best known for his role as Eric Murphy in the HBO series Entourage, and his role as the eldest son Ryan Malloy in the 1990s television sitcom Unhappily Ever After. Connolly is also a director, having directed many television episodes as well as the films Gardener of Eden, Dear Eleanor, and Gotti.

== Life and career ==
Connolly was born in New York State, and raised in Medford, New York, on Long Island. His mother, Eileen, is of Irish descent. He has an older brother, Tim, a police detective for Suffolk County, New York, police. Connolly graduated from Patchogue-Medford High School in 1992.

He began his career at age six, appearing in television commercials, including the "Betcha bite a chip" campaign for Chips Ahoy!. In 1990, he landed his first film role, as Chickie in Rocky V. Two years later, Connolly was cast as Shaun Kelly in the film adaptation of Myron Levoy's novel Alan & Naomi, and co-starred with Tobey Maguire in the short-lived Fox sitcom Great Scott!. His appearance in the series later earned him a Young Artist Award nomination for Best Young Actor Co-starring in a Television Series. He portrayed Dabney Coleman's son in the comedy film The Beverly Hillbillies. Connolly continued guest starring in television series including Wings, Getting By and the medical drama ER.

From 1995 to 1996, Connolly starred in Don's Plum alongside Maguire and Leonardo DiCaprio. Later that year, he landed the role of Ryan Malloy on the situation comedy Unhappily Ever After. The series also marked Connolly's directorial debut when he directed six episodes in its fourth season. In 2007, Connolly made his full-length movie directorial debut with the film Gardener of Eden, which premiered in April 2007 at the Tribeca Film Festival.

Connolly's best-known role is the character Eric Murphy, better known as "E", on the 2004–2011 HBO show Entourage. E is the manager and best friend of Vincent Chase, who is played by Adrian Grenier. In 2009, Connolly was nominated for the Golden Globe Award for Best Actor – Television Series Musical or Comedy for the role. Connolly reprised his role as Eric in the 2015 Entourage film adaptation.

In addition to television work, Connolly has appeared in several major motion pictures including Antwone Fisher, Secretariat, John Q., The Notebook and He's Just Not That Into You.

Connolly directed his first music video in 2008, for the song "Camera Phone" by rapper The Game, featuring Ne-Yo.

Connolly attended the 2010 NHL entry draft in Los Angeles and announced the final pick of the first round for his hometown New York Islanders. A lifelong Islanders fan, Connolly also directed the documentary film Big Shot, which screened at the 2013 TriBeCa Film Festival and the 2013 Hamptons International Film Festival The film revisits the fraud perpetrated by would-be Islanders owner John Spano in 1996.

He directed the 2018 film Gotti, which starred John Travolta as mobster John Gotti. Connolly was hired after a number of other directors, including Barry Levinson, were attached to the project during its lengthy development process. The film was a critical and commercial disaster, and is one of the few films to hold an approval rating of 0% on the website Rotten Tomatoes.

On July 15, 2020, Connolly was accused of rape by assistant costume designer Gracie Cox. The alleged assault occurred in December 2005, during a wrap party for Gardener of Eden. Connolly later denied the allegation through a spokesperson, stating that the encounter was consensual.

On January 11, 2021, it was announced that Connolly was expecting his first child with actress Zulay Henao. Their daughter was born in June 2021.

In 2024, Connolly was accused by multiple people of wage theft.

== Filmography ==
=== Film ===
Year	Title	Role	Notes
1990	Rocky V	Chickie	
1992	Alan & Naomi	Shaun Kelly	
1993	The Beverly Hillbillies	Morgan Drysdale	
1995	Angus	Andy	
1997	Sub Down	Petty Officer Holliday	Alternative title: Sub Down: Take the Dive
1999	Tyrone	Sam Adams	Alternative title: Bad Trip
2000	Up, Up and Away	Malcolm	TV movie
2001	Drum Solo		
2001	Don's Plum	Jeremy	
2002	Devious Beings	Casey	
2002	John Q.	Steve Maguire	
2002	Antwone Fisher	Slim	
2004	The Notebook	Fin	
2005	The Check Up	Mike	
2009	He's Just Not That Into You	Conor Barry	
2009	The Ugly Truth	Jim Ryan	
2010	Secretariat	Bill Nack	
2010	Wax On, F*ck Off	Himself	Short film
2014	Reach Me	Roger	
2015	Entourage	Eric 'E' Murphy	
2020	Chick Fight	Dr. Roy	
2024	Krazy House	Jesus	
2027	Lice	Detective Sikorski	Post-production; also creator of original concept

=== Television ===
Year	Title	Role(s)	Notes
1992	Great Scott!	Larry O'Donnell	Series regular, 13 episodes
1993	Wings	Scotty Nelson	Episode: "Joe Blows: Part 1"
1994	Getting By	Spider	Episode: "It Takes a Thief"
1994	ER	uncredited	Episode: "9 1/2 Hours"
1995–1999	Unhappily Ever After	Ryan Malloy	Series regular, 100 episodes, also director (6 episodes)
2001	First Years	Joe	5 episodes
2004–2011	Entourage	Eric 'E' Murphy	Series regular, 96 episodes, also director (2 episodes)
2007	Robot Chicken	Psychiatrist/Cowboy Curtis/Leonard Baker	Episode: "More Blood, More Chocolate"
2014	Friends with Better Lives	Bobby Lutz	Series regular
2016	Pitch	Charlie Graham	Recurring role
2019	The Oath	James Hoke	2 episodes
2025	All's Fair	Damien Lord	Episode: "I Want Revenge"

=== Director ===
Year	Title	Notes
1997–1999	Unhappily Ever After	6 episodes
2003	Whatever We Do	
2007	Gardener of Eden	
2008	Camera Phone - The Game ft. Ne-Yo	Music video
2010–2011	Entourage	2 episodes: "Porn Scenes from an Italian Restaurant", "Second to Last"
2013	ESPN 30 for 30	Big Shot
2014	Dear Eleanor	
2018	Snatch	3 episodes: "Bomba", "Heavy Wears the Crown", "Diamonds Ain't Forever"
2018	Gotti	

== Awards and nominations ==
Year	Award	Category	Nominated work	Result
1993	Young Artist Award	Best Young Actor Co-Starring in a Television Series	Great Scott!	Nominated
2005	Satellite Award	Outstanding Actor in a Series, Comedy or Musical	Entourage	Nominated
2006	Teen Choice Award	Choice Chemistry - Television (Shared with the cast of Entourage)	Entourage	Nominated
2007	Screen Actors Guild Award	Outstanding Performance by an Ensemble in a Comedy Series (Shared with the cast of Entourage)	Entourage	Nominated
2008	Screen Actors Guild Award	Outstanding Performance by an Ensemble in a Comedy Series (Shared with the cast of Entourage)	Entourage	Nominated
2009	Golden Globe Award	Best Performance by an Actor in a Television Series – Musical or Comedy	Entourage	Nominated
2009	Screen Actors Guild Award	Outstanding Performance by an Ensemble in a Comedy Series (Shared with the cast of Entourage)	Entourage	Nominated
2019	Golden Raspberry Award	Worst Director	Gotti	Nominated
