= The End (Entourage) =

- Entourage episode
- Episode no.: Season 8 Episode 8
- Directed by: David Nutter
- Written by: Doug Ellin
- Cinematography by: Todd A. Dos Reis
- Editing by: Gregg Featherman
- Original release date: September 11, 2011
- Running time: 31 minutes

Guest appearances
- Beverly D'Angelo as Barbara Miller (special guest star); Alan Dale as John Ellis (special guest star); Rachel Zoe as Herself (special guest star); Alice Eve as Sophia Lear (special guest star); Malcolm McDowell as Terrence McQuewick (special guest star); Nora Dunn as Dr. Marcus; Cassidy Lehrman as Sarah Gold; Jonathan Keltz as Jake Steinberg; Piero Barone as Opera Singer #1; Ignazio Boschetto as Opera Singer #2; Gianluca Ginoble as Opera Singer #3

Episode chronology
| ← Previous "Second to Last" | Next → — |

"The End" is the series finale of the American comedy-drama television series Entourage. It is the eighth episode of the eighth season and the 96th overall episode of the series. The episode was written by series creator Doug Ellin, and directed by David Nutter. It originally aired on HBO on September 11, 2011.

The series chronicles the acting career of Vincent Chase, a young A-list movie star, and his childhood friends from Queens, New York City, as they attempt to further their nascent careers in Los Angeles. In the final episode, Vince surprises the boys by announcing he will marry Sophia. The boys try to persuade Sloan in allowing Eric to be part of his baby's life, while Ari makes a surprising move to save his marriage.

According to Nielsen Media Research, the episode was seen by an estimated 2.61 million household viewers and gained a 1.6 ratings share among adults aged 18–49, making it the most watched episode of the season. The finale received mixed reviews from critics, who expressed dissatisfaction with the closure to the storylines. Some deduced that some of the storylines were held back for a possible film continuation. A feature-length film continuation would be released in June 2015.

== Plot ==
After one date with Sophia (Alice Eve), Vince (Adrian Grenier) surprises Drama (Kevin Dillon), Turtle (Jerry Ferrara) and Billy (Rhys Coiro) by revealing that they will get married. The wedding will be held on Paris and it will occur the very next day. Vince asks Eric (Kevin Connolly) to be his best man, but Eric reveals that he will leave for New York City to be close to his child, even if Sloan (Emmanuelle Chriqui) does not like it.

Drama and Turtle visit Sloan to convince her in going to Paris for the wedding, but Sloan is hesitant over being with Eric at the scene. While buying the ring, Vince is called by Terrance (Malcolm McDowell), and tries to get him to accept Eric in her life. However, Vince reveals that Sloan is pregnant, infuriating Terrance. Vince himself visits Sloan, winning her over by explaining that his love for Sophia is reminiscent of her relationship with Eric.

Ari (Jeremy Piven) is now struggling at work, with Barbara (Beverly D'Angelo) offering to give him a loan if he sells his share of the company. He is visited by Melissa (Perrey Reeves), who asks him to come to therapy to discuss how they will their kids over the divorce. The session proves to be a challenge for them, as Ari is unable to properly explain why the divorce is happening. During this, Melissa reveals that Bobby Flay broke up with her, while Ari says Dana ended their relationship as she knew he was still in love with Melissa. After talking with Sarah (Cassidy Lehrman), Ari decides to play an opera CD that she gave him two months ago. Moved by the song, he informs Barbara that he quits.

Ari goes home and serenades Melissa with the opera singers, telling her he quit and wants to spend the rest of his life with her. Moved, Melissa accepts. They are interrupted by Lloyd (Rex Lee), upset that Ari quit without informing him. Ari explains his decision and tells him to sign the opera singers as his new clients. He and Melissa arrive at the airport to meet up with Vince and join him in the wedding. As the boys prepare to leave, Vince tells Eric that he gave him a private plane with Sloan. The boys separate and leave for their respective destinations.

In a post-credits scene, Ari and Melissa are now living in Italy. As she leaves for a moment, Ari is called by John Ellis (Alan Dale), criticizing Ari for not accepting his studio head offer years ago. Ari is uninterested in the offer, but Ellis reveals that he is retiring and wants Ari to succeed as the CEO of Time Warner, giving him a week to consider. As Melissa returns, Ari debates over the offer.

== Production ==
=== Development ===
The episode was written by series creator Doug Ellin, and directed by David Nutter. This was Ellin's 62nd writing credit, and Nutter's tenth directing credit.

=== Writing ===
Doug Ellin clarified that the producers decided on ending the series with the eighth season, "I think nobody wanted it to end, but we all knew it was time to end. HBO didn't cancel us. We had a long talk with them about when it should end two years ago. It feels like the right time." While he wasn't aware of how it would be received, he was only content with his own opinion, "I just watched the final episode, the first cut, but it matches my expectations and that's all I can do."

== Reception ==
=== Viewers ===
In its original American broadcast, "The End" was seen by an estimated 2.61 million household viewers with a 1.6 in the 18–49 demographics. This means that 1.6 percent of all households with televisions watched the episode. This was a 51% increase in viewership with the previous episode, which was watched by an estimated 1.72 million household viewers with a 1.0 in the 18–49 demographics.

=== Critical reviews ===
"The End" received mixed reviews from critics. Steve Heisler of The A.V. Club gave the episode a "D" grade and wrote, "It boils Entourage down to the simple fact that these boys joined Vince's entourage, and good things came of their affiliation with a famous movie star who is rich. I'm thrilled a show like Entourage finally had the guts to articulate what everyone else in Hollywood was too afraid to say. And it only took ruining Adrian Grenier's career to do it."

Alan Sepinwall of HitFix wrote, "season 2 and parts of season 3 at least came close to seeming like a genuine piece of comedic entertainment. But boy did the show coast for a long, long, long time, all the way up until this limp, unenthusiastic finale." Kate Stanhope of TV Guide wrote, "Deep down, the series was always about the friendship between these four guys, and seeing that friendship morph into something new and less codependent for Eric and Vince felt right."

Ken Tucker of Entertainment Weekly wrote, "Early on in its life, Entourage did a pretty good job of making you care whether Vince could retain his sense of integrity while being the star of an Aquaman hit and the auteur of the flop Medellin. After a while, however, we came to realize that Vince had slowly, steadily lost any sense of the division between idealism and success. In this, the series mirrored what was going on in the pop culture, the politics, and the economy of America over the years in which Entourage existed." Jessica Grose of Slate wrote, "When the show premiered in 2004, the country was riding high, and for some people the Entourage lifestyle was aspirational. It was probably outside the realm of possibility for the average bro, but maybe, just maybe, you too could live in an enormous tacky mansion and have sex with models and porn stars. By 2011 those dreams are dashed, and Entourage stopped trying to even toy with realism or emotional depth. The finale recognized this – to its own benefit."

Alessandra Stanley of The New York Times wrote, "People think that love can't last in Hollywood, but in real life friendship is more capricious. Entourage nurtured the fantasy that some bonds are so precious that nothing, not even fame, money and sex, can tear them asunder." Margaret Lyons of Vulture wrote, "Entourage's finale last night attempted to escape the series' narrative downward trajectory, but whatever bright spots there were in the episode weren't enough to nudge it toward the show's former glory days."

Nate Rawlings of TIME wrote, "It's true that, as a series, Entourage peaked a while ago, but the show never stopped being fun. It was one more thing to look forward to at the end of the weekend, before you and your friends had to pack it in for another long work week. So in that effort, Doug Ellin and his fellow creators found success." Renata Sellitti of TV Fanatic gave the episode a 4.5 star rating out of 5 and wrote, "So, even though at times it was a little sappy, or Ari's cry face got a little ugly, I can stand behind most of the moments in this series finale, if not every single one. Here's hoping that Entourage 2.0 will be better than the Sex and the City movies, or the second one at least."
