= Sniff Sniff Gang Bang =

- Entourage episode
- Episode no.: Season 7 Episode 8
- Directed by: David Nutter
- Written by: Doug Ellin; Ally Musika
- Cinematography by: Rob Sweeney
- Editing by: Jeff Groth
- Original release date: August 22, 2010
- Running time: 30 minutes

Guest appearances
- Rob Morrow as Jim Lefkowitz (special guest star); Beverly D'Angelo as Barbara Miller (special guest star); Mark Cuban as Himself (special guest star); Miguel Sandoval as Carlos (special guest star); Sasha Grey as Herself (special guest star); Constance Zimmer as Dana Gordon (special guest star); William Fichtner as Phil Yagoda (special guest star); Jeffrey Tambor as Himself (special guest star); Rhys Coiro as Billy Walsh (special guest star); Dania Ramirez as Alex; Nora Dunn as Dr. Marcus; Bob Odenkirk as Ken Austin; Jonathan Keltz as Jake Steinberg; Janet Montgomery as Jennie

Episode chronology
← Previous "Tequila and Coke"	Next → "Porn Scenes from an Italian Restaurant"

"Sniff Sniff Gang Bang" is the eighth episode of the seventh season of the American comedy-drama television series Entourage. It is the 86th overall episode of the series and was written by series creator Doug Ellin and executive producer Ally Musika, and directed by David Nutter. It originally aired on HBO on August 22, 2010.

The series chronicles the acting career of Vincent Chase, a young A-list movie star, and his childhood friends from Queens, New York City, as they attempt to further their nascent careers in Los Angeles. In the episode, Vince is asked to take a drug test, which he refuses. Meanwhile, Ari faces consequences after the exposé, while Turtle tries to save his business.

According to Nielsen Media Research, the episode was seen by an estimated 2.65 million household viewers and gained a 1.5/5 ratings share among adults aged 18–49. The episode received mixed reviews from critics, who questioned the logic behind Vince's actions in the episode.

== Plot ==
Sasha Grey tells Vince (Adrian Grenier) that she is considering an offer to appear in a porn film, where she would have sex with five men. Vince does not like the idea and tells her to decline, but Sasha states she is not asking him permission. Carlos (Miguel Sandoval) questions Turtle (Jerry Ferrara) over his new plans for Avion Tequila, as they do not have enough resources to supply the demand, so Turtle sets out in finding investors.

After the Deadline Hollywood exposé, Ari (Jeremy Piven) decides to use a more calmed and healthy attitude at the agency, but none of his colleagues buy it. Ari faces pressure from Dana (Constance Zimmer) over Vince's attitude, and is also forced to attend marriage counseling with Melissa (Perrey Reeves). Melissa expresses frustration that Ari prioritizes his job over his family, and threatens with a separation if he does not improve. Billy (Rhys Coiro) informs Eric (Kevin Connolly) that Vince was caught using cocaine. Deducing that Scott (Scott Caan) is responsible, he angrily confronts him at his office and demands that he stop influencing Vince.

Yagoda (William Fichtner) tells Eric that Johnny's Bananas is well received by the network and are willing to go ahead with a new actor if Drama (Kevin Dillon) passes on the project. Eric is still insistent on having Drama involved, even if he is still unconvinced on the project. Visiting Ari, Turtle and Alex (Dania Ramirez) run into Mark Cuban and his business colleague Ken Austin (Bob Odenkirk). Cuban takes an interest in Avion Tequila, and offers them a chance to visit Sacramento to discuss a possible partnership, surprising Ari.

When he discovers that Randall Wallace wants a drug test, Vince personally visits Dana to assure them he is fine. While Dana stands by him, Wallace decides to quit the film. Frustrated, Eric confronts Vince over his actions, but Vince is unaffected by his words. Vince suggests it wasn't the first time he used cocaine and claims everything is fine. He also tells Eric to find a way to get Sasha a role in the film.

== Production ==
=== Development ===
The episode was written by series creator Doug Ellin and executive producer Ally Musika, and directed by David Nutter. This was Ellin's 57th writing credit, Musika's 17th writing credit, and Nutter's sixth directing credit.

== Reception ==
=== Viewers ===
In its original American broadcast, "Sniff Sniff Gang Bang" was seen by an estimated 2.65 million household viewers with a 1.5/5 in the 18–49 demographics. This means that 1.5 percent of all households with televisions watched the episode, while 5 percent of all of those watching television at the time of the broadcast watched it. This was a slight decrease in viewership with the previous episode, which was watched by an estimated 2.72 million household viewers with a 1.5/4 in the 18–49 demographics.

=== Critical reviews ===
"Sniff Sniff Gang Bang" received mixed reviews from critics. Dan Phillips of IGN gave the episode a "good" 7.5 out of 10 and wrote, "As a whole, "Sniff Sniff Gang Bang" was far from the season's best outing, but it did push certain storylines in interesting directions. And as long as these next two episodes mix a few more laughs into the drama before inevitably pulling back from this increasingly dark direction, it will be easy to call Season 7 a winner – even with its slow start and considerable weaknesses."

Steve Heisler of The A.V. Club gave the episode a "D+" grade and wrote, "There should be something personal behind the action. But there isn't. Vince's actions, as his existence on the Hollywood map at all, still seem to be driven by other people and their actions. So tonight Vince finally loses it and snaps at E, demanding, among other things, that E find Sasha a part in his new movie. I can understand why somebody like Vince would do that. I don't really buy that Vince himself would, even given all the (quickly escalating) circumstances. Vince is by far the show's weakest link, and it's really starting to show." Allyssa Lee of Los Angeles Times wrote, "Of course, the Dallas Mavericks owner (who towers over his acting counterparts, by the way) was into wee Turtle's pitch, and seemed more than willing to pony up funds to get another tequila factory going. To which I say, really? Even for a show that revolves around wish fulfillment, this seemed way too good to be true."

Josh Wigler of MTV wrote, "Really, the only character on the upswing is Drama, and he doesn't even know it. Although network executives are in love with director Billy Walsh's proposal for a Drama-led animated series, the elder Chase brother isn't interested in satirizing himself for all the world to see — but something tells me he'll change his mind by the time the season of Entourage is over." Eric Hochberger of TV Fanatic gave the episode a 2.5 star rating out of 5 and wrote, "So outside of a fantastic title, what did we think of the actual episode? After two strong episodes, we were a little disappointed with this week's installment."
