= Lose Yourself (Entourage) =

- Entourage episode
- Vincent arrives at the hospital shortly with a bloody and bruised face after getting punched by Eminem.
- Episode no.: Season 7 Episode 10
- Directed by: David Nutter
- Written by: Doug Ellin
- Original air date: September 12, 2010
- Running time: 31 minutes

Guest appearances
- Beverly D'Angelo as Barbara Miller; Rhys Coiro as Billy Walsh; Janet Montgomery as Jennie; Jami Gertz as Marlo Klein; Dania Ramirez as Alex; Illeana Douglas as Marci; Malcolm McDowell as Terrance; Bob Odenkirk as Ken Austin; Sasha Grey as herself; Eminem as himself; Christina Aguilera as herself; John Cleese as himself; Mark Cuban as himself; Drew Brees as himself; Ryan Howard as himself; Minka Kelly as herself; Jordan Farmar as himself; Kevin Love as himself; Royce da 5'9" as himself; Mr. Porter as himself; Paul Rosenberg as himself; The Alchemist as himself

Episode chronology
← Previous "Porn Scenes from an Italian Restaurant"	Next → "Home Sweet Home"

"Lose Yourself" is the seventh-season finale of the American comedy-drama television series Entourage. It originally aired on HBO in the United States on September 12, 2010. The episode mainly centers on Vincent Chase (Adrian Grenier), whose issues begin to intensify between his ex-girlfriend and his current girlfriend, Sasha Grey. Although riddled with similar issues, Ari Gold (Jeremy Piven), Eric Murphy (Kevin Connolly), and Turtle (Jerry Ferrara) collaborate with each other in an attempt to orchestrate an intervention for Vince, only to make things worse.

"Lose Yourself" was written by Doug Ellin, and directed by David Nutter. The episode features guest appearances from music artists, including Christina Aguilera and Eminem. It marked the conclusion of the plot arc between Grey and Chase. The episode was well received by television critics. Upon its initial airing, it attained 2.72 million viewers and garnered a 1.6/4 rating in the 18-49 demographic, according to the Nielsen ratings.

== Plot ==
After Sasha Grey informs Vincent Chase that she will participate in a pornographic film, he expresses his disapproval. While on the set of production, the couple engage in an intense argument and simultaneously break up, making Vincent leave angrily. Meanwhile, Johnny "Drama" Chase and his friends orchestrate an intervention much to Vincent's dismay, and he leaves the premises.

Eric Murphy begins to worry that his relationship with his fiancée Sloan McQuewick may be crumbling. He has dinner with Sloan's father, Terrence, but is shocked when Terrence asks him to sign a prenuptial agreement. Eric gets upset and confronts Sloan about it, and she tells him that they will talk about it when he returns home, to which he agrees. However, upon discovering that his boss Murray Berenson has been reporting to Terrence, Eric changes his mind and contacts Scott Lavin. Eric tells him that he'll join forces with him to take over the company, effectively pushing Murray out of his own firm.

Similarly, Ari Gold suffers setbacks in his marriage when, despite throwing an extravagant party for Ms. Ari, she decides to leave him and has her sister go to the house to retrieve her belongings. Overwhelmed with depression, Vincent consumes alcohol and snorts cocaine in his hotel room, and then decides to attend Eminem's private party at the hotel lobby. He walks around being rude, hitting on girls, and refuses to leave when security asks him to do so. Johnny attempts to bring him home, but Vincent refuses to go with him. After being greeted by Eminem, Vincent begins insulting him which leads to him punching Vincent in the face, initiating a brawl in the process. Vincent is then rushed to the hospital shortly thereafter and attempts to leave, despite the orders of the medical staff. As he nears the entrance, he is confronted by a police officer, who informs him that Vince will need to go with him, as the officer has found a bag of cocaine in Vincent's clothes, leaving everyone stunned.

== Production ==
"Lose Yourself" was written by series creator Doug Ellin and directed by David Nutter. In June 2010, it was announced that Eminem and Christina Aguilera would make guest appearances in the episode. In an interview with Entertainment Weekly, Ellin explained that "[Eminem] has a little conflict [...] with Vince [Adrian Grenier]." Similarly, Ellin revealed that Aguilera would perform a song in the episode, adding that "she [does] Ari a favor and [performs] at a party for him." Principal photography for the episode commenced shortly thereafter, and concluded two weeks later. Grenier revealed that he had offered Eminem a guest role in the series. He stated, "I actually met Eminem several months ago, interviewing him for a documentary we're making. He mentioned that he loved the show." Upon his approval, Grenier contacted creator Ellin, who agreed to cast Eminem for a future appearance. The episode was used to promote Recovery, the seventh studio album of Eminem.

"Lose Yourself" marks the conclusion of the plot arc between Sasha Grey and Vincent Chase (Adrian Grenier). Grey was cast for the seventh season in May 2010, where she played a fictionalized version of herself, in a relationship with Chase.

The episode features appearances from several recurring actors and actresses for the series. "Lose Yourself" marked the introduction of Marci, who is portrayed by Illeana Douglas. Janet Montgomery reprised her role as Jenni, the assistant of Eric Murphy. This would be Montgomery's first recurring appearance in the series since "Sniff Sniff Gang Bang". Rhys Coiro guest starred as Billy Walsh, having last appeared in the season seven episode "Porn Scenes from an Italian Restaurant". Other appearances include Bob Odenkirk, Jami Gertz, Dania Ramirez, and Malcolm McDowell. Cameo appearances were made by Mark Cuban, Drew Brees, John Cleese, Jordan Farmar, Ryan Howard, Minka Kelly, The Alchemist, Paul Rosenberg, Royce da 5'9", and Kon Artis.

== Reception ==
"Lose Yourself" was initially broadcast on September 12, 2010, in the United States on HBO. It received 2.72 million viewers upon airing, and garnered a 1.6/4 rating in the 18-49 demographic. Total viewership was up 8% from the previous season finale; however, total viewership and ratings for the episode were slightly down from the previous episode, "Porn Scenes from an Italian Restaurant", which was viewed by 2.86 million households and achieved a 1.8/5 rating in the 18-49 demographic, according to the Nielsen ratings.

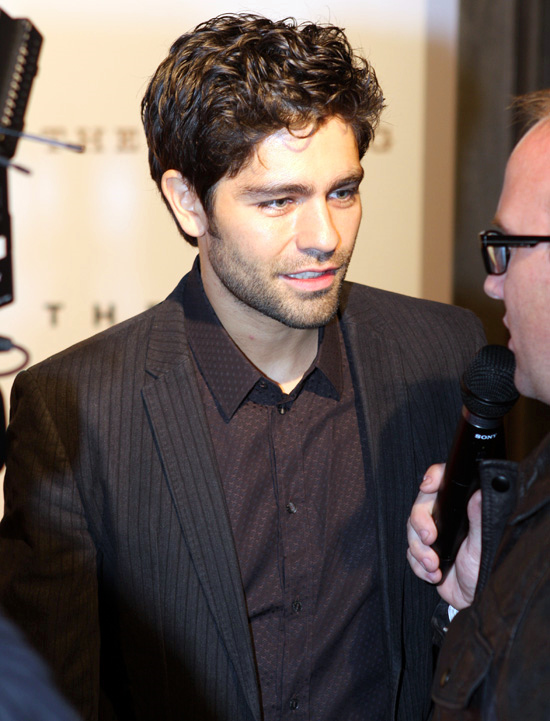
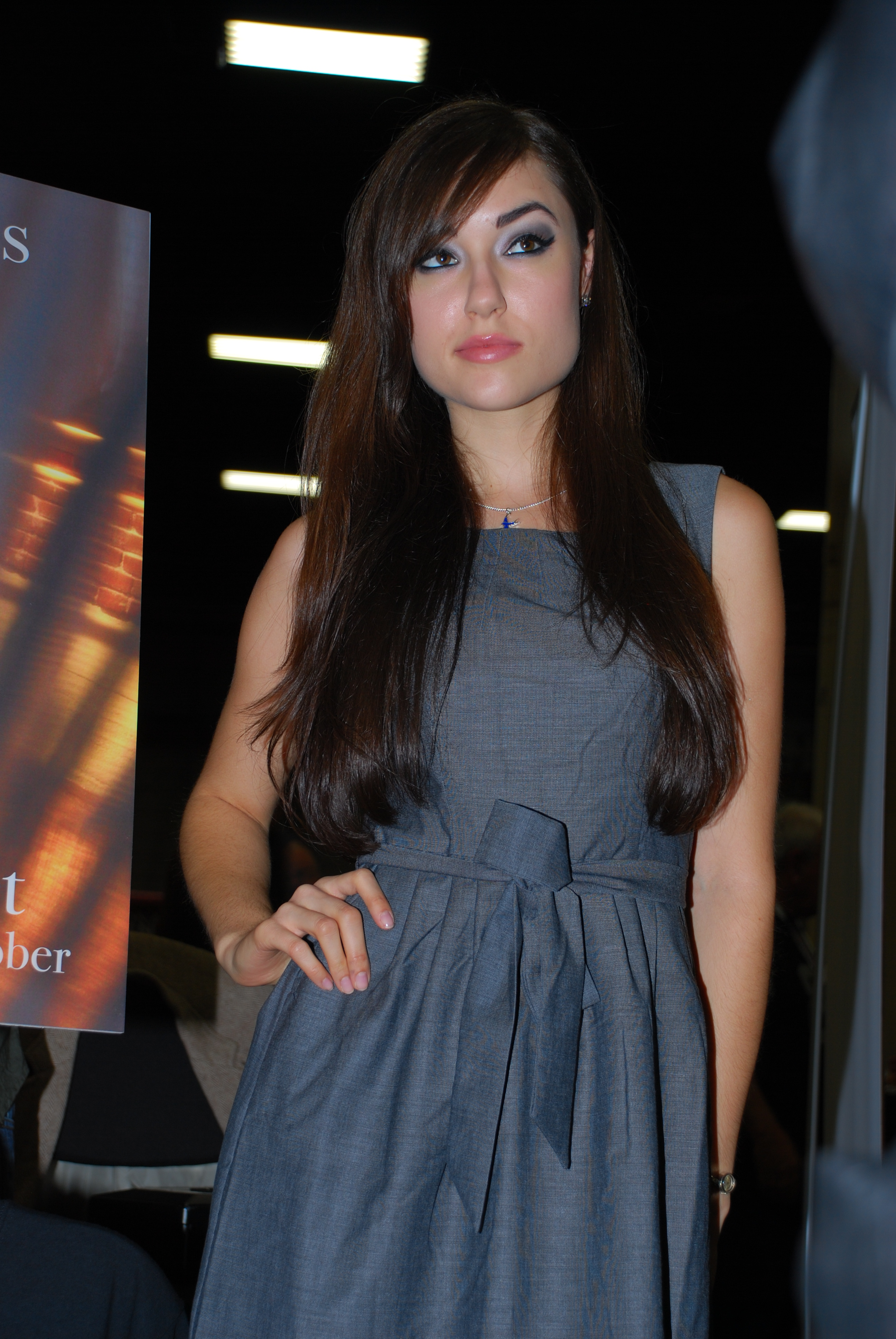
Critics were polarized by the plot arc between Adrian Grenier (left) and Sasha Grey (right).

"Lose Yourself" was well received by most television critics. James Poniewozik of Time has mixed reactions to the episode. He was critical of the plot arc between Grey and Chase, harshly criticizing Grey's acting and expressing that "[he] didn't think that Adrian Grenier had completely sold Vince’s downward spiral." He continued: "There’s something half-jokey about his manner that makes me think he’s about to break up laughing, as in a blooper reel." In contrast, Poniewozik felt that "for the first time in a while, I’m really interested to see what happens on Entourage next." Dan Philips of IGN gave the episode a nine out of ten, signifying an "amazing" rating. Philips praised "Lose Yourself", opining that it was an "excellent, extremely entertaining climax to this season's two main plot lines." He added, "Even though the episode never got around to providing any resolution, the overall journey was engaging enough to make its cliffhanger feel less like a cheap trick to get us to tune in for season eight." Similar sentiments were expressed by Josh Wagler of MTV, who praised Grenier's performance, opining that it was his best performance to date. The A.V. Club writer Kyle Ryan gave the episode a 'B−' grade. Ryan wrote, "The last episode teed up tonight’s many confrontations [...]. For a show that has specialized in spinning its wheels, these were surprisingly high stakes." He was critical with the development of Vincent Chase, as well as his storyline with Sasha Grey, commenting that "Vincent and his coterie just aren’t that interesting."

Blair Marnell of CraveOnline gave the episode an eight out of ten rating, noting that the episode "hit its dramatic points." Marnell commended Grenier's acting, as he opined, "I've never hated Vince before this season, but that's the reaction that he was meant to elicit. Vince has always been a little bit shallow, but never to this extent. Vince never told his friends that they needed him more than he needed them before. And while it's definitely true to a certain extent, part of Vince's charm was that he never threw that back in their faces." In concurrence, TV Fanatic's Eric Hochberger expressed that "Lose Yourself" was a "stellar season finale with plenty of unanswered cliffhangers for next season." Concluding his review, Hochberger gave the episode a 4.5 out of 5 stars.
