= Tequila and Coke (Entourage) =

- Entourage episode
- Episode no.: Season 7 Episode 7
- Directed by: David Nutter
- Written by: Doug Ellin; Ally Musika
- Cinematography by: Rob Sweeney
- Editing by: Gregg Featherman
- Original release date: August 15, 2010
- Running time: 28 minutes

Guest appearances
- Beverly D'Angelo as Barbara Miller (special guest star); Carrie Fisher as Anna Fowler (special guest star); Miguel Sandoval as Carlos (special guest star); Constance Zimmer as Dana Gordon (special guest star); Sasha Grey as Herself (special guest star); Randall Wallace as Himself (special guest star); Lenny Kravitz as Himself (special guest star); Sean Combs as Himself (special guest star); Jerry Jones as Himself (special guest star); Rhys Coiro as Billy Walsh (special guest star); Mark Wahlberg as Himself (special guest star); Autumn Reeser as Lizzie Grant; Dania Ramirez as Alex; Jonathan Keltz as Jake Steinberg; Janet Montgomery as Jennie; Patrick Gallagher as Randy

Episode chronology
← Previous "Hair"	Next → "Sniff Sniff Gang Bang"

"Tequila and Coke" is the seventh episode of the seventh season of the American comedy-drama television series Entourage. It is the 85th overall episode of the series and was written by series creator Doug Ellin and executive producer Ally Musika, and directed by David Nutter. It originally aired on HBO on August 15, 2010.

The series chronicles the acting career of Vincent Chase, a young A-list movie star, and his childhood friends from Queens, New York City, as they attempt to further their nascent careers in Los Angeles. In the episode, Vince continues jeopardizing his career, while Ari tries to salvage his reputation by talking with Lizzie. Meanwhile, Billy offers an animated series featuring Drama, while Turtle faces problems with his business.

According to Nielsen Media Research, the episode was seen by an estimated 2.72 million household viewers and gained a 1.6/5 ratings share among adults aged 18–49. The episode received very positive reviews from critics, who praised the dramatic conflicts of the episode.

== Plot ==
Vince (Adrian Grenier) starts using cocaine with Scott (Scott Caan) and Sasha Grey, despite being told by Eric (Kevin Connolly) that he needs to meet with Randall Wallace to discuss the film. The meeting ends badly, as Wallace quickly suspects that Vince is using cocaine.

Ari (Jeremy Piven) contacts Deadline Hollywood editor Anna Fowler (Carrie Fisher), who claims she didn't receive any recordings from Lizzie (Autumn Reeser). Discovering that Lizzie suddenly quit Amanda's agency, he follows her to convince her in not divulging the recordings. Lizzie simply asks why she was not promoted, and Ari reveals he felt pressured because of her affair with Andrew. Convinced, Lizzie promises to give him the recordings back if she can get a job at a studio. Ari convinces Dana (Constance Zimmer) in getting her a position at the studio by getting Lenny Kravitz to appear in a film.

Turtle (Jerry Ferrara) makes a deal with a liquor store owner, Randy (Patrick Gallagher), for exclusivity in his tequila. However, Carlos (Miguel Sandoval) cannot provide him with the needed 50 cases of tequila, so Turtle is forced to ask many celebrity friends to return the cases. Billy (Rhys Coiro) pitches his animated series, Johnny's Bananas, to Drama (Kevin Dillon) and Eric, where Drama would voice an angry monkey facing addictions. While Drama opposes, Eric actually likes the idea.

Ari contacts Kravitz, but is unable to make him commit to the film as he fears the director is trying to flirt with him. Despite not getting a job, Lizzie nevertheless returns the recordings to Ari and parts ways. Right after she leaves, Barbara (Beverly D'Angelo) informs Ari that Deadline Hollywood just published an article on the recordings, depicting Ari as a tyrant and abusive leader. He is called by Jerry Jones, who cuts all ties with him, and ignores Melissa's calls. When Wallace complains to Eric over the meeting, he angrily calls Vince. Vince, who is leaving on a car with Sasha, claims everything is fine and denies using cocaine.

== Production ==
=== Development ===
The episode was written by series creator Doug Ellin and executive producer Ally Musika, and directed by David Nutter. This was Ellin's 56th writing credit, Musika's 16th writing credit, and Nutter's fifth directing credit.

== Reception ==
=== Viewers ===
In its original American broadcast, "Tequila and Coke" was seen by an estimated 2.72 million household viewers with a 1.6/5 in the 18–49 demographics. This means that 1.6 percent of all households with televisions watched the episode, while 5 percent of all of those watching television at the time of the broadcast watched it. This was a 6% increase in viewership with the previous episode, which was watched by an estimated 2.56 million household viewers with a 1.5/4 in the 18–49 demographics.

=== Critical reviews ===
"Tequila and Coke" received very positive reviews from critics. Dan Phillips of IGN gave the episode a "great" 8.5 out of 10 and wrote, "Entourage's latest episode was proof that the show can work even when it's not all that funny. "Tequila and Coke" managed to hit the mark by upping the dramatic stakes and pushing Vince and company (but mostly Vince) down an exceedingly dark path, one far more substantial than the "obstacles" the series' writers have placed in front of these characters in seasons past."

Steve Heisler of The A.V. Club gave the episode a "B–" grade and wrote, "There's little chance to construct those immediate silly scenarios. So what do we have? E calling Vince to wake up three seconds after calling him to wake up, culminating in a sitcom-y eye-roll. Vince going to a meeting during which he promises not to tweet anymore about tequila with, "My fingers are sealed. [Chucklesies!!!]" Billy showing off his drawings of Drama as a monkey for the animated show he wants to pitch. The audience forgets to laugh, so the characters on the show fill in the silence. Yet while the comedy was painful, the drama in "Tequila & Coke" wasn't half bad."

Allyssa Lee of Los Angeles Times wrote, "And the hits just keep on coming for Entourage boys in this episode, titled “Tequila and Coke.” The half hour started buoyantly enough, with babes in and out of bikinis at a sex- and drug-fueled after party, sponsored by Avion tequila, which saw Vince, Scotty, Sasha and another girl riding high on talk of jumping out of planes and blow, and Chris Bosh offering a bartender $1,000 to get his girl a drink made out of vodka." Josh Wigler of MTV wrote, "Happy as I am for his promotion, Lloyd's absence is very noticeable this season. Some how, some way, the Entourage creative team has to find a logical way to bring him back into the picture — and fast."

Janaki Cedanna of TV Fodder wrote, "Bottom line is that I think this is the best episode of the season hands down but possibly one of the best written and naturalistic episodes the series has ever delivered." Eric Hochberger of TV Fanatic gave the episode a 4 star rating out of 5 and wrote, "Turns out nothing wakes up a half-naked actor from his poolside like some cocaine. During this week's aptly-named "Tequila and Coke," Vince decided to dabble in the white powder. As much as we're already sick of seeing Vince's career tank after Medellin, it is kind of refreshing to see Vince just tank as a human being."
