= Game of Thrones: Season 3 (soundtrack) =

Soundtrack album by Ramin Djawadi
- Released: June 4, 2013
- Genre: Soundtrack
- Length: 53:12
- Label: WaterTower Music
- Producer: Ramin Djawadi

Ramin Djawadi soundtrack chronology
Red Dawn (2012)	Game of Thrones: Season 3 (2013)	Pacific Rim (2013)

Singles from Game of Thrones: Season 3
- 1. "The Bear and the Maiden Fair" Released: June 4, 2013

The soundtrack album of the third season of HBO series Game of Thrones, titled Game of Thrones: Season 3, was released digitally on June 4, 2013, and on CD on July 2, 2013. The album was composed by Ramin Djawadi.

== Reception ==
The soundtrack received positive reviews from critics.

== Track listing ==
No.	Title	Key scenes/Notes	Length
1.	"Main Title"	Used in the opening sequence	1:44
2.	"A Lannister Always Pays His Debts"	House Lannister's theme. "The Bear and the Maiden Fair": Plays as Jaime and Brienne leave Harrenhal and at the end credits. "Second Sons": A modified version appears as Cersei tells Margaery the story of House Reyne of Castamere's failed rebellion. "The Rains of Castamere": A live version plays at the infamous Red Wedding. The title comes from the popular saying, "A Lannister always pays his debts". A shorter version is used on the main menu of season 3's DVD/Blu-ray release.	2:50
3.	"Dracarys"	Targaryen and Dragons' Battle Theme "And Now His Watch Is Ended": Daenerys buys the Unsullied, orders them to kill the masters and liberates Astapor. "Breaker of Chains": Daenerys throws barrels filled with chains on Meereen. Contains the melody of Daenerys Targaryen's theme ("Love in the Eyes") and hints of House Targaryen Theme ("Fire and Blood").	2:53
4.	"I Paid the Iron Price"	"And Now His Watch Is Ended": Theon reveals to a disguised Ramsay that he never killed the Stark children, and laments his choice of House Greyjoy over House Stark. "The Bear and the Maiden Fair": Theon is tended to by the two women. The title comes from the line: "I paid the iron price for Winterfell." It is mostly a dirge-like arrangement of the House Greyjoy theme ("What Is Dead May Never Die").	3:15
5.	"Chaos Is a Ladder"	Petyr Baelish's theme. "The Climb": Littlefinger's conversation with Varys, Ros is seen to have been killed by Joffrey and Sansa watches as Lord Baelish's ship sails without her. The title comes from Lord Baelish's line: "Chaos isn't a pit, chaos is a ladder". Its main melody appeared previously in several tracks from season 1, like "Await the King's Justice", "A Raven from King's Landing" or "A Bird Without Feathers" among others, though most notably in "The Throne Is Mine" from season 2.	2:58
6.	"Dark Wings, Dark Words"	Unused in the series. A choral version of the main theme.	2:47
7.	"You Know Nothing"	Jon Snow and Ygritte's theme. "Kissed by Fire": Jon and Ygritte make love in the cave. "The Climb": Jon and Ygritte make it atop the Wall and embrace. "The Bear and the Maiden Fair": Ygritte and Jon kiss. "Mhysa": Jon tells Ygritte she always knew what he is, that they love each other, and Jon escapes while Ygritte shoots him three times.	3:19
8.	"Wall of Ice"	The new Night's Watch theme. "The Climb": Jon, Ygritte and the wildlings climb up the Wall. The Wall breaks and Orell tries to cut Jon and Ygritte loose. "The Rains of Castamere": Jon is unable to kill the old man and turns on the wildlings.	3:19
9.	"Kingslayer"	Jaime Lannister's theme. "Kissed by Fire": Jaime tells Brienne about the sack of King's Landing and how he killed Aerys to save the city. "Mhysa": Jaime meets Cersei as he arrives to King's Landing. "No One": After taking Riverrun, Jaime sees Brienne and Podrick who escape the castle by the river; Brienne and Jaime make a hand's sign. The title comes from the name bestowed upon Jaime Lannister, the Kingslayer.	2:11
10.	"I Have to Go North"	"Kissed by Fire": Robb tells Talisa he has to attack Casterly Rock, and to do so must ask for help to Walder Frey. "The Rains of Castamere": Robb explains his plan to Catelyn, and they arrive to the Twins. "Mhysa": Bran, Hodor, Meera and Jojen march north of the Wall. The title comes from Bran's line: "Please, Sam, I have to go north." Contains the melody of the House Stark theme ("Goodbye Brother") and the main theme.	1:23
11.	"White Walkers"	The White Walkers' theme. "Valar Dohaeris": A longer arrangement of the intro is heard when Jon tells Mance Rayder about Craster giving his sons to the White Walkers. "The Bear and the Maiden Fair": The same arrangement is heard when Osha relates the story of her husband's death and resurrection as a wight. "Second Sons": The full version plays as a White Walker comes for Gilly's baby and Sam kills it with the dragonglass dagger. It is also heard throughout the credits.	3:20
12.	"It's Always Summer Under the Sea (Shireen's Song)" (performed by Kerry Ingram)	"Kissed by Fire": Shireen sings to herself. Also played at the end credits.	1:17
13.	"Reek"	"Walk of Punishment": Theon attempts to escape from his captors. "Mhysa": Ramsay beats Theon until he acknowledges "Reek" as his new name. Contains hints of the melody of House Greyjoy's theme ("What Is Dead May Never Die").	2:41
14.	"The Bear and the Maiden Fair" (performed by The Hold Steady)	"Walk of Punishment": Used in the credits sequence.	2:56
15.	"The Night Is Dark"	"Valar Dohaeris": Davos Seaworth is found and rescued by Salladhor Saan. "Kissed by Fire": Selyse tells Stannis that she has already been told by Melisandre by his cheating on her. Stannis tells Shireen that Davos is a traitor. Contains the melody of the Stannis Baratheon theme ("Warrior of Light"). The title comes from the famous phrase used by the practitioners of the faith of R'hllor: "For the night is dark and full of terrors."	2:56
16.	"The Lannisters Send Their Regards"	"The Rains of Castamere": During the massacre at the Red Wedding. "Mhysa": During the Red Wedding, as the Stark men are being massacred and Robb Stark's corpse is beheaded and Grey Wind's head put in its place. The title comes from Roose Bolton's infamous line, spoken when killing Robb Stark. Contains the melodies of the House Stark theme ("Goodbye Brother"), "I Am Hers, She Is Mine", the honor theme and the main theme.	5:44
17.	"Heir to Winterfell"	"Dark Wings, Dark Words": Robb and Catelyn receive news of Hoster Tully's death, the burning of Winterfell and the disappearance of Bran and Rickon. "The Rains of Castamere": Rickon and Osha part for the Last Hearth. Contains hints of the House Stark theme ("Goodbye Brother").	2:14
18.	"Mhysa"	"Mhysa": As the Yunkish slaves worship Daenerys chanting "Mhysa", which means "mother" in Ghiscari. Contains the melody of Daenerys Targaryen's theme ("Love in the Eyes") and the main theme.	3:54
19.	"For the Realm"	Unused in the series. A Spanish guitar version of the main theme.	1:31
Total length:			54:00

== Credits and personnel ==
Personnel adapted from the album liner notes.

- David Benioff – liner notes
- Ramin Djawadi – composer, primary artist, producer
- The Hold Steady – band, primary artist

- George R.R. Martin – lyricist
- Kerry Ingram – primary artist
- D.B. Weiss – liner notes

== Charts ==
Chart (2013)	Peak position
Belgian Albums (Ultratop Flanders)	139

== Awards and nominations ==
Year	Award	Category	Nominee(s)	Result	Ref.
2013	ASCAP Awards	Top Television Series		Won	
2013	International Film Music Critics Association	Best Original Score for a Television Series		Nominated	
