= Home Sweet Home (Entourage) =

- Entourage episode
- Episode no.: Season 8 Episode 1
- Directed by: Doug Ellin
- Written by: Doug Ellin
- Cinematography by: Rob Sweeney
- Editing by: Gregg Featherman
- Original release date: July 24, 2011
- Running time: 30 minutes

Guest appearances
- Johnny Galecki as Himself (special guest star); Andrew Dice Clay as Himself (special guest star); Jonathan Keltz as Jake Steinberg; Janet Montgomery as Jennie; Branden Williams as Himself

Episode chronology
← Previous "Lose Yourself"	Next → "Out with a Bang"

"Home Sweet Home" is the first episode of the eighth season of the American comedy-drama television series Entourage. It is the 89th overall episode of the series and was written and directed by series creator Doug Ellin. It originally aired on HBO on July 24, 2011.

The series chronicles the acting career of Vincent Chase, a young A-list movie star, and his childhood friends from Queens, New York City, as they attempt to further their nascent careers in Los Angeles. In the episode, Vince leaves rehabilitation and sets out to improve his personal and professional life with the boys. Meanwhile, Ari tries to win Melissa back after their separation.

According to Nielsen Media Research, the episode was seen by an estimated 2.49 million household viewers and gained a 1.4 ratings share among adults aged 18–49. The episode received mixed reviews from critics, who criticized the multiple subplots.

== Plot ==
Some time after the events of the previous episode, things have changed. Vince (Adrian Grenier) has spent 90 days in rehabilitation in Malibu, and is prepared to leave. Eric (Kevin Connolly) and Sloan (Emmanuelle Chriqui) have called off their engagement and broke up, and Sloan has asked him to move out of the house.

Vince is picked up by the boys, and Drama (Kevin Dillon) gets rid of all drugs and alcohol in the mansion to help him in the transition. Vince tells the boys that he wants to make a new film, wherein a group of miners are saved by a dog. While the boys hate the idea, they lie to him to support him. Eric in particular is upset when he learns that Vince contacted everyone but ignored him during his stay at rehabilitation. Meanwhile, Ari (Jeremy Piven) finds ways to spend more time with his son, while trying desperately to win Melissa (Perrey Reeves) back. During a visit, he asks to give another chance to marriage counseling, but is devastated when she reveals she is already seeing someone else.

At the party, the tension between Vince and Eric increases, and Vince demands that his friends be honest with him. They finally admit they do not like his idea, although Billy (Rhys Coiro) notes it could work as a movie starring Drama. Eric finally admits his feelings and reconciles with Vince. However, a fire hits the mansion when Turtle (Jerry Ferrara) throws a cigarette out of the window.

== Production ==
=== Development ===
The episode was written and directed by series creator Doug Ellin. This was Ellin's 59th writing credit, and fifth directing credit.

== Reception ==
=== Viewers ===
In its original American broadcast, "Home Sweet Home" was seen by an estimated 2.49 million household viewers with a 1.4 in the 18–49 demographics. This means that 1.4 percent of all households with televisions watched the episode. This was a 9% decrease in viewership with the previous episode, which was watched by an estimated 2.72 million household viewers with a 1.6/4 in the 18–49 demographics.

=== Critical reviews ===
"Home Sweet Home" received mixed reviews from critics. Steve Heisler of The A.V. Club gave the episode a "B–" grade and wrote, "What is an episode of Entourage with a decent story, some real stakes, and a notable lack of boobs? I'm not quite sure but I do know it's not “bad.” Sure, this is the show that started out as a legitimately entertaining skewer of the Hollywood lifestyle, morphed that skewer into a palm-shaped one for which to apply sufficient handjobs, then dropped the tool altogether and awaited death’s sweet embrace, with boobs. All the while, though, it was clear Entourage was just shy of decentness; a few tweaks here, a few compelling storylines there, could have turned the show around. It didn't want to, though, and last season was like a “Movie Of The Week,” broken up into half hour segments, and boobs."

Joe Flint of Los Angeles Times wrote, "As riveting as it might be to portray a star on top of the world on the verge of losing it all, that sort of drama is not this show's strong suit. Entourage is leaving at the right time. Let's hope it goes out the way it came in." Hollywood.com wrote, "My only worry is that this season is going to happen exactly like we all expect it to. But I guess that's exactly what we want, right?"

Ben Lee of Digital Spy wrote, "Vince believes that it's a good omen - a "clean start" - and we certainly hope so. Vince's downward spiral last season has seemingly been put to rest at long last, and hopefully the show can start working on delivering a fitting end to the whole series." TV Fanatic gave the episode a 3 star rating out of 5 and wrote, "even though the plot line was interesting this time around, the dialogue wasn’t, and the acting was, at times, painful. Because this is the final season, Mark Wahlberg and the boys better step up their game with what few episodes they have left. Here's hoping things turn around next week."
