= The Big Bang (Entourage) =

- Entourage episode
- Episode no.: Season 8 Episode 6
- Directed by: David Nutter
- Written by: Doug Ellin; Jerry Ferrara
- Cinematography by: Todd A. Dos Reis
- Editing by: Gregg Featherman
- Original release date: August 28, 2011
- Running time: 28 minutes

Guest appearances
- Rob Morrow as Jim Lefkowitz (special guest star); Beverly D'Angelo as Barbara Miller (special guest star); Bobby Flay as Himself (special guest star); David Spade as Himself (special guest star); Melinda Clarke as Herself (special guest star); Johnny Galecki as Himself (special guest star); Alice Eve as Sophia Lear (special guest star); William Fichtner as Phil Yagoda (special guest star); Andrew Dice Clay as Himself (special guest star); Debi Mazar as Shauna Roberts (special guest star); Sonny Marinelli as John DeLuca; Elizabeth Regen as Gina DeLuca; Janet Montgomery as Jennie; Cameron Richardson as Lindsay

Episode chronology
← Previous "Motherfucker"	Next → "Second to Last"

"The Big Bang" is the sixth episode of the eighth season of the American comedy-drama television series Entourage. It is the 94th overall episode of the series and was written by series creator Doug Ellin and main cast member Jerry Ferrara, and directed by David Nutter. It originally aired on HBO on August 28, 2011.

The series chronicles the acting career of Vincent Chase, a young A-list movie star, and his childhood friends from Queens, New York City, as they attempt to further their nascent careers in Los Angeles. In the episode, Vince continues chasing Sophia, while Drama receives bad news over his strike. Meanwhile, Turtle welcomes the owners of his favorite restaurant, while Ari confronts his wife.

According to Nielsen Media Research, the episode was seen by an estimated 2.16 million household viewers and gained a 1.3 ratings share among adults aged 18–49. The episode received mixed reviews from critics, who criticized Vince's storyline and pacing.

== Plot ==
During his Vanity Fair photo shoot, Vince (Adrian Grenier) is upset when he learns that Sophia (Alice Eve) made him look as a womanizer in her article. While Shauna (Debi Mazar) wants him to focus on the good aspects, Vince is worried over what his mother might think and leaves the photoshoot to meet with Sophia. Sophia refuses to change the article, telling him once again that he means nothing to her.

Turtle (Jerry Ferrara) gets John (Sonny Marinelli) and Gina DeLuca (Elizabeth Regen), the owners of Don Pepe's restaurant, to arrive in Los Angeles to start setting the place. However, the couple are more focused on visiting the city, frustrating Turtle. Meanwhile, Ari (Jeremy Piven) is informed by Jim Lefkowitz (Rob Morrow) that Melissa (Perrey Reeves) will get half of his earnings and possibly take his share of the agency as he got $11 million from her. Eric (Kevin Connolly) ignores Melinda Clarke's phone calls, until she gives him a Mercedes-Benz SLS AMG. She claims the car was for getting her cast in a series, and insults him for still thinking about Sloan.

The network is getting angry over the strike affecting Johnny's Bananas. Drama (Kevin Dillon) starts worrying when his accounts are frozen, and Yagoda (William Fichtner) threatens to ruin his career if he does not stop the strike. He forcefully declines the demands, although he is relieved when he and Andrew Dice Clay are given their desired salaries to return to work immediately. Ari confronts Melissa at his house, annoyed that she is cooking with Bobby Flay. He tells her that he never hid his true nature from her, expressing that Melissa is the one who hid her true nature. While conversing with Melinda, Eric is approached by Johnny Galecki, who makes a crude remark over spending time with Sloan. Angry, Eric tells Scott (Scott Caan) to drop Galecki as a client.

== Production ==
=== Development ===
The episode was written by series creator Doug Ellin and main cast member Jerry Ferrara, and directed by David Nutter. This was Ellin's 61st writing credit, Ferrara's second writing credit, and Nutter's ninth directing credit.

== Reception ==
=== Viewers ===
In its original American broadcast, "The Big Bang" was seen by an estimated 2.16 million household viewers with a 1.3 in the 18–49 demographics. This means that 1.3 percent of all households with televisions watched the episode. This was a 15% decrease in viewership with the previous episode, which was watched by an estimated 2.53 million household viewers with a 1.5 in the 18–49 demographics.

=== Critical reviews ===
"The Big Bang" received mixed reviews from critics. Steve Heisler of The A.V. Club gave the episode a "C+" grade and wrote, "A few things get resolved in 'The Big Bang', but it's becoming clear that the show doesn't want to bite off more than it can chew. The plotlines left open are the ones that the show's been building towards during its entire run, and the ones that close are the ones recently opened."

Nate Rawlings of TIME wrote, "Entourage's writers are trying something difficult in the few weeks before the series ends — giving Vincent Chase, the womanizing, patronizing movie star, actual character development. They're trying to have Vince grow up and see the sadness in his years of chasing women, but they're doing it by having him chase a woman. Strange, I know." Hollywood.com wrote, "Entourage plodded along this episode, wrapping up a few major conflicts, proving that nothing Vince does is really of consequence, dispelling more drama with Sloane and making us actually feel sorry for Ari, which I didn't think was possible."

Ben Lee of Digital Spy wrote, "Melinda Clarke is still awesome. To Eric: "I can't believe I didn't f**k you good enough to make you forget about her."" Renata Sellitti of TV Fanatic gave the episode a 4 star rating out of 5 and wrote, "Looks like there's trouble brewing for Vincent "Don't Hate Me Because I'm Beautiful" Chase. Nah, not really. He's just unhappy because the Vanity Fair story was completed and apparently Sophia struck a nerve. I mean, all she did was tell the world he's as deep as a puddle - correction: an insecure, womanizing puddle - and he freaks out. What's wrong with that? I'll tell you what's wrong with that, Sophia. Nobody messes with our Vince."
