= Out with a Bang (Entourage) =

- Entourage episode
- Episode no.: Season 8 Episode 2
- Directed by: Doug Ellin
- Written by: Ally Musika
- Cinematography by: Rob Sweeney
- Editing by: Gregg Featherman
- Original release date: July 31, 2011
- Running time: 26 minutes

Guest appearances
- William Fichtner as Phil Yagoda (special guest star); Christian Slater as Himself (special guest star); Andrew Dice Clay as Himself (special guest star); Jonathan Keltz as Jake Steinberg; Illeana Douglas as Marcie; Annie Ilonzeh as Rachel; Jamie Lee Darley as Abby; Genesis Rodriguez as Sarah

Episode chronology
← Previous "Home Sweet Home"	Next → "One Last Shot"

"Out with a Bang" is the second episode of the eighth season of the American comedy-drama television series Entourage. It is the 90th overall episode of the series and was written by executive producer Ally Musika, and directed by series creator Doug Ellin. It originally aired on HBO on July 31, 2011.

The series chronicles the acting career of Vincent Chase, a young A-list movie star, and his childhood friends from Queens, New York City, as they attempt to further their nascent careers in Los Angeles. In the episode, Vince tries to get Billy involved in his project, while Drama helps Andrew Dice Clay with their show. Meanwhile, Ari tries to find Melissa's new boyfriend and Eric has another encounter with Sloan.

According to Nielsen Media Research, the episode was seen by an estimated 2.14 million household viewers and gained a 1.2 ratings share among adults aged 18–49. The episode received mixed reviews from critics, who criticized the episode's pacing.

== Plot ==
The boys are forced to move into a hotel after the fire at the mansion. Vince (Adrian Grenier) presents the boys with a 20-page outline of his planned idea for Drama (Kevin Dillon). He approaches Billy (Rhys Coiro) over his idea, who decides to check it out.

Due to a misunderstanding in the phone call, Eric (Kevin Connolly) is insulted by Sloan (Emmanuelle Chriqui) over the phone when he accidentally left a message in her phone. As he retrieves his watch from her apartment, they get into another argument, which ends with them having sex. Ari (Jeremy Piven) is informed by Lloyd (Rex Lee) that Melissa (Perrey Reeves) was seen at a restaurant with a man, and Ari takes this personal as he and Melissa disliked the restaurant. Using his contacts, he finds that the man is a waiter aspiring to become an actor. He uses his power to sabotage his auditions for Mad Men.

Drama and his co-star Andrew Dice Clay record their lines for Johnny's Bananas, when Clay asks for his help in representation. Drama gets Scott (Scott Caan) involved to help Clay, while Yagoda (William Fichtner) informs them that the show received positive word of mouth from test screenings. Melissa angrily confronts Ari over sabotaging the waiter's career, also revealing that she is actually dating the restaurant's owner, prompting Ari to prohibit his staff from mentioning it ever again. Eric decides to call Sloan to discuss their encounter, but is heartbroken when she reveals she has chosen to move to New York City.

== Production ==
=== Development ===
The episode was written by executive producer Ally Musika, and directed by series creator Doug Ellin. This was Musika's 19th writing credit, and Ellin's sixth directing credit.

== Reception ==
=== Viewers ===
In its original American broadcast, "Out with a Bang" was seen by an estimated 2.14 million household viewers with a 1.2 in the 18–49 demographics. This means that 1.2 percent of all households with televisions watched the episode. This was a 15% decrease in viewership with the previous episode, which was watched by an estimated 2.49 million household viewers with a 1.4 in the 18–49 demographics.

=== Critical reviews ===
"Out with a Bang" received mixed reviews from critics. Steve Heisler of The A.V. Club gave the episode a "B–" grade and wrote, "Well, I imagine the direction given to the Diceman about tonight's episode was something relatively substantial, but he was probably like, “No way dude, I’m gonna just say ‘fuck’ a lot, because that’s just what the Diceman ordered!” It doesn't help that Clay has all the subtlety of a sleeveless leather jacket at a faux-coolness convention. His scenes were pretty terrible, and a major distraction from what was, knock on Avion, the second halfway decent episode of Entourage in a row. I know. What the fuck is happening to this terrible show I want so desperately to hate?"

Joe Flint of Los Angeles Times wrote, "This episode seemed designed to set up stories in the coming weeks. Ari will struggle with dealing with his wife’s dating and figuring out his next move. Johnny and Dice will risk their new show before it even has a chance to succeed. Eric will try to move on from Sloan, and Vince will need something other than writing a TV movie for his brother to hold his interest, or ours." Hollywood.com wrote, "There really is no ceiling on celebrity cameos and it's pretty obnoxious, but then again it's the boys' last hurrah so we'll just have to roll our eyes and take it."

Ben Lee of Digital Spy wrote, "After everything the pair have gone through over so many seasons, it probably wouldn't feel right if they didn't end up together eventually. And here's hoping Ari and his wife can make up before the end, too." Renata Sellitti of TV Fanatic gave the episode a 2.5 star rating out of 5 and wrote, "One would think with Scott around, Ari on the warpath, E single and Turtle soon-to-be-single, there'd be more debauchery brewing. We're waiting, Entourage, and trying to be patient."
