= Whiz Kid (Entourage) =

- Entourage episode
- Episode no.: Season 8 Episode 4
- Directed by: Roger Kumble
- Written by: Doug Ellin; Jerry Ferrara
- Cinematography by: Rob Sweeney
- Editing by: Gregg Featherman
- Original release date: August 14, 2011
- Running time: 23 minutes

Guest appearances
- Rob Morrow as Jim Lefkowitz (special guest star); Constance Zimmer as Dana Gordon (special guest star); Bobby Flay as Himself (special guest star); Debi Mazar as Shauna Roberts (special guest star); Nora Dunn as Dr. Marcus

Episode chronology
← Previous "One Last Shot"	Next → "Motherfucker"

"Whiz Kid" is the fourth episode of the eighth season of the American comedy-drama television series Entourage. It is the 92nd overall episode of the series and was written by series creator Doug Ellin and main cast member Jerry Ferrara, and directed by Roger Kumble. It originally aired on HBO on August 14, 2011.

The series chronicles the acting career of Vincent Chase, a young A-list movie star, and his childhood friends from Queens, New York City, as they attempt to further their nascent careers in Los Angeles. In the episode, the boys struggle with the aftermath of Ertz's suicide, while Vince is pressured to take a drug test. Meanwhile, Ari takes Dana to dine at Melissa's boyfriend's restaurant.

According to Nielsen Media Research, the episode was seen by an estimated 2.46 million household viewers and gained a 1.4 ratings share among adults aged 18–49. The episode received mixed reviews from critics, who criticized the tone and unsatisfying follow-up to the previous episode.

== Plot ==
As the police takes Ertz's body out of his house, Vince (Adrian Grenier) and Turtle (Jerry Ferrara) are accompanied by the boys to the Los Angeles County Sheriff's Department. As he was in the house, Vince is asked to take a drug test. To the boys' disdain, Vince reveals that he used marijuana a few days back to prove himself something.

Ari (Jeremy Piven) and Dana (Constance Zimmer) continue their sexual relationship. Due to helping Vince with Ertz's problem, Ari arrives late to marriage counseling with Melissa (Perrey Reeves). Their argument increases as both express frustration with each other, ending with Melissa walking out. Angered, he decides to take Dana to Bobby Flay's restaurant to make Melissa jealous. When Flay reveals Ari's intentions, Dana angrily leaves the restaurant. Ari is later called by Melissa for his actions, realizing that she suspected him of sleeping with Dana for years. Drama (Kevin Dillon) tries to create an alcohol mix to clean Vince's test, but the boys find that the test will be held in the following hours. Desperate, Vince visits Billy (Rhys Coiro) for his help.

With Billy's help, Vince gets a prosthetic penis with clean urine. Eric (Kevin Connolly) is upset over his idea, warning him that his career could die if he is caught, but Vince performs the drug test anyway. Later, Vince passes the test, to his friends' delight. Vince reveals that he wore the prosthetic after all, for which Eric forgives him.

== Production ==
=== Development ===
The episode was written by series creator Doug Ellin and main cast member Jerry Ferrara, and directed by Roger Kumble. This was Ellin's 60th writing credit, Ferrara's first writing credit, and Kumble's first directing credit.

== Reception ==
=== Viewers ===
In its original American broadcast, "Whiz Kid" was seen by an estimated 2.46 million household viewers with a 1.4 in the 18–49 demographics. This means that 1.4 percent of all households with televisions watched the episode. This was a 4% increase in viewership with the previous episode, which was watched by an estimated 2.36 million household viewers with a 1.3 in the 18–49 demographics.

=== Critical reviews ===
"Whiz Kid" received mixed reviews from critics. Steve Heisler of The A.V. Club gave the episode a "C+" grade and wrote, "Although 'Whiz Kid' is built around a prosthetic penis filled with clean urine and despite the fact that episode ends with the guys laughing as they throw said prosthetic penis between one another, I'm having trouble finding the humor in this particular episode of Entourage."

Nate Rawlings of TIME wrote, "The latest episode of Entourage centered on whether Vince would pass a mandatory drug test that, if he failed, could land him back in jail. This being Entourage, though, we were never really that worried." Hollywood.com wrote, "This season is bound to be a little erratic and uncontained, but I just wish we couldn't see the trajectory for the season building before our eyes. Granted, it's been that way for a few seasons now; you can almost always guess what's coming next at this point. With only 8 episodes, I suppose they don't have too much room to blow our minds, but let's hope there are few more unexpected angles in the second half of the show's final run."

Ben Lee of Digital Spy wrote, "'Whiz Kid' feels like it tries to be two things at once - mixing the seriousness of Vince's current predicament with several attempts at humour. Neither really works." Renata Sellitti of TV Fanatic gave the episode a 4.5 star rating out of 5 and wrote, "Last night's episode was utterly brilliant, from beginning to end. After weeks of waiting patiently for this season to heat up, this week the action took off like a shot... through Carl Ertz's head."
