= Hair (Entourage) =

- Entourage episode
- Episode no.: Season 7 Episode 6
- Directed by: Doug Ellin
- Written by: Doug Ellin
- Cinematography by: Todd A. Dos Reis
- Editing by: Steven Sprung
- Original release date: August 8, 2010
- Running time: 29 minutes

Guest appearances
- Rob Morrow as Jim Lefkowitz (special guest star); Beverly D'Angelo as Barbara Miller (special guest star); Constance Zimmer as Dana Gordon (special guest star); Sasha Grey as Herself (special guest star); Rhys Coiro as Billy Walsh (special guest star); Carla Gugino as Amanda Daniels (special guest star); Autumn Reeser as Lizzie Grant; Dania Ramirez as Alex; Jonathan Keltz as Jake Steinberg; Janet Montgomery as Jennie

Episode chronology
← Previous "Bottoms Up"	Next → "Tequila and Coke"

"Hair" is the sixth episode of the seventh season of the American comedy-drama television series Entourage. It is the 84th overall episode of the series and was written and directed by series creator Doug Ellin. It originally aired on HBO on August 8, 2010.

The series chronicles the acting career of Vincent Chase, a young A-list movie star, and his childhood friends from Queens, New York City, as they attempt to further their nascent careers in Los Angeles. In the episode, Vince jeopardizes his career with some risky moves. Meanwhile, Ari faces a lawsuit from Lizzie and Amanda, while Billy Walsh asks Eric for help in restarting his career.

According to Nielsen Media Research, the episode was seen by an estimated 2.56 million household viewers and gained a 1.5/4 ratings share among adults aged 18–49. The episode received very positive reviews from critics, who praised the storylines and ending.

== Plot ==
At his mansion, Vince (Adrian Grenier) and Sasha Grey shoot a commercial endorsing Avion Tequila, filmed by Turtle (Jerry Ferrara) and Alex (Dania Ramirez). Turtle, however, is feeling anxious over his relationship with Alex, as he feels he is not living up to his potential during sex.

Ari (Jeremy Piven) and Barbara (Beverly D'Angelo) are informed by Ari's attorney, Jim Lefkowitz (Rob Morrow), that Lizzie (Autumn Reeser) plans to sue Ari for wrongful termination. Ari tries to end the rivalry with Amanda (Carla Gugino), but she is unwilling to let Ari get away with his problems easily, also revealing that Lizzie has incriminating recordings of Ari. Ari stalks Lizzie to talk her into buying her silence. Lizzie says she will not sue him, but she already delivered the recordings to Deadline Hollywood. As Eric (Kevin Connolly) and Scott (Scott Caan) celebrate Vince's deal for the Air-Walker film, Eric is approached by Billy Walsh (Rhys Coiro). Since the failure of Medellín, Billy spent the past years rehabilitating his image and improving his behavior. He wants to find a job and asks Eric for his help.

Billy moves in with Vince, upsetting Eric. However, Billy says he has an idea for a project: an animated series, which could also star Drama (Kevin Dillon). That night, Ari angrily visits Vince's mansion. Turtle accidentally posted the commercial to Twitter, causing confusion over Vince's relationship with Sasha. The studio executives, Dana Gordon (Constance Zimmer) included, are concerned over Vince's relationship, feeling it could dampen the film's potential. Ari and Eric go to the pool, finding a naked Vince passed out.

== Production ==
=== Development ===
The episode was written and directed by series creator Doug Ellin. This was Ellin's 55th writing credit and fourth directing credit.

== Reception ==
=== Viewers ===
In its original American broadcast, "Hair" was seen by an estimated 2.56 million household viewers with a 1.5/4 in the 18–49 demographics. This means that 1.5 percent of all households with televisions watched the episode, while 4 percent of all of those watching television at the time of the broadcast watched it. This was a 11% decrease in viewership with the previous episode, which was watched by an estimated 2.85 million household viewers with a 1.7/5 in the 18–49 demographics.

=== Critical reviews ===
"Hair" received very positive reviews from critics. Dan Phillips of IGN gave the episode a "great" 8.5 out of 10 and wrote, "In addition to all its great dramatic twists and subtly hilarious jokes, what made "Hair" rise so far above the season's previous installments and even the enjoyable "Bottoms Up" is the way it for the first time tied all of the year's arcs together by the episode's end. Again, it was impossible not to sense these characters all circling the drain together, which is a huge step in the right direction for a show that's often failed to raise the dramatic stakes even when it's tried so desperately to temporarily derail Vince's career. "Hair" works largely because you get the feeling this time Entourage's star – or any of the characters for that matter – might not land back on his feet so easily."

Steve Heisler of The A.V. Club gave the episode a "B+" grade and wrote, "Ho boy, now we're getting somewhere. There's tension and drama on the show that might take two, maybe three episodes to resolve. And that final shot, with Vince face-down poolside: I can say with absolutely no sarcasm that I did not see that coming."

Allyssa Lee of Los Angeles Times wrote, "As Vince told a glum and unemployed Drama during this half-hour, the nature of this business called show is a lot of up and down, up and down. One day you’re on top of the world, and then next you're passed out naked on the side of the pool. And this episode, titled “Hair,” saw most of the Entourage boys dwelling in their valleys." Josh Wigler of MTV wrote, "By the end of "Hair," a very drunk and very naked Vince lies face down next to his pool while Eric and Ari hover over him, ready to tackle the biggest career move of the young (and unconscious) actor's life. Can Vince pull himself together enough to land the "Airwalker" deal? We'll find out next week."

Janaki Cedanna of TV Fodder gave the episode a 4 out of 5 and wrote, "I don't know about you but I'm totally loving this season so far. The infusion of new blood has kept it from being the same old and has given it the shot in the arm it sorely needed. Keep it going guys." Eric Hochberger of TV Fanatic gave the episode a 3 star rating out of 5 and wrote, "This season? The short little furry guy continues to score chicks way out of his league. So out of his league that even the girls seem to admit it on the show. Oh and some lame tequila subplot that somehow leads to Vince's demise. What!?"
