= Porn Scenes from an Italian Restaurant =

- Entourage episode
- Episode no.: Season 7 Episode 9
- Directed by: Kevin Connolly
- Written by: Ally Musika
- Cinematography by: Todd A. Dos Reis
- Editing by: Steven Sprung
- Original release date: August 29, 2010
- Running time: 28 minutes

Guest appearances
- Queen Latifah as Herself (special guest star); Miguel Sandoval as Carlos (special guest star); Mark Cuban as Himself (special guest star); Sasha Grey as Herself (special guest star); Ethan Suplee as Himself (special guest star); Peter Berg as Himself (special guest star); William Fichtner as Phil Yagoda (special guest star); Rhys Coiro as Billy Walsh (special guest star); Carla Gugino as Amanda Daniels (special guest star); Dania Ramirez as Alex; Bob Odenkirk as Ken Austin; Cassidy Lehrman as Sarah Gold; Jonathan Keltz as Jake Steinberg; Janet Montgomery as Jennie

Episode chronology
← Previous "Sniff Sniff Gang Bang"	Next → "Lose Yourself"

"Porn Scenes from an Italian Restaurant" is the ninth episode of the seventh season of the American comedy-drama television series Entourage. It is the 87th overall episode of the series and was written by executive producer Ally Musika, and directed by main cast member Kevin Connolly. It originally aired on HBO on August 29, 2010.

The series chronicles the acting career of Vincent Chase, a young A-list movie star, and his childhood friends from Queens, New York City, as they attempt to further their nascent careers in Los Angeles. In the episode, Vince tries to get a role for Sasha Grey in his film when he feels he is losing her. Meanwhile, Ari suspects Amanda sabotaged him, while Turtle tries to get Carlos to invest with Mark Cuban.

According to Nielsen Media Research, the episode was seen by an estimated 2.86 million household viewers and gained a 1.8/5 ratings share among adults aged 18–49. The episode received mixed reviews from critics, who praised Vince's storyline, but criticized the subplots.

== Plot ==
While drinking with Sasha Grey and Scott (Scott Caan), Vince (Adrian Grenier) learns that she will film a porn scene with her former fiancé. This alarms Vince, who heavily pushes Eric (Kevin Connolly) in getting her a part in the Air-Walker film and to find a new director. He meets with Peter Berg, who is willing to direct the film and give a supporting role to Sasha.

Ari (Jeremy Piven) spends time with his family, although Amanda (Carla Gugino) constantly calls him but he ignores her. While shopping with Melissa (Perrey Reeves), Ari notices his client Queen Latifah, and is upset when she tells him Amanda will be in charge of launching the new NFL team in the city. Drama (Kevin Dillon) is still debating on the idea of starring in Johnny's Bananas, but becomes intrigued after talking with Eric's assistant, Jennie (Janet Montgomery). He decides to skip the pitch meeting with Yagoda (William Fichtner), simply telling him he accepts to star, delighting him. Carlos (Miguel Sandoval) arrives in Los Angeles, angry that Turtle (Jerry Ferrara) involved Avion Tequila with Mark Cuban. He meets with Cuban, and angers him when he demands a $5 million in investment, prompting Cuban to threaten in buying the brand outright. Despite the threat, Cuban agrees in getting Avion as an official supplier of the Dallas Mavericks.

While dining with Melissa at a restaurant, Ari notices Amanda in attendance. During this, Vince and Sasha dine and discuss her part in the film. Sasha is taken aback by the offer and Vince's statement that he loves her. While arguing, they decide to have sex in the restaurant's bathroom. Amanda approaches Ari, who decides to call her out for sending the recordings to Deadline Hollywood and sabotaging his NFL deal. Amanda reveals that an ex-assistant was responsible, as he disliked Ari. She also reveals that she met with the NFL to get Ari a role in the deal, but she changed her mind. A shaken Ari leaves alone as Melissa stays.

At the mansion, Drama and Turtle celebrate with Alex (Dania Ramirez) and Lloyd (Rex Lee) over their new deals. Lloyd leaves to find tequila, but he returns astonished after finding a large bag of cocaine.

== Production ==
=== Development ===
The episode was written by executive producer Ally Musika, and directed by main cast member Kevin Connolly. This was Musika's 18th writing credit, and Connolly's first directing credit.

== Reception ==
=== Viewers ===
In its original American broadcast, "Porn Scenes from an Italian Restaurant" was seen by an estimated 2.86 million household viewers with a 1.8/5 in the 18–49 demographics. This means that 1.8 percent of all households with televisions watched the episode, while 5 percent of all of those watching television at the time of the broadcast watched it. This was a 7% increase in viewership with the previous episode, which was watched by an estimated 2.65 million household viewers with a 1.5/5 in the 18–49 demographics.

=== Critical reviews ===
"Porn Scenes from an Italian Restaurant" received mixed reviews from critics. Dan Phillips of IGN gave the episode an "amazing" 9 out of 10 and wrote, ""Porn Scenes from an Italian Restaurant" was a great episode filled with very pleasant albeit dark surprises. Will the season finale be able to bring any sense of resolution to these stories? That much remains to be seen. What's important is we're almost definitely not going to get the quick, easy answers this show has been known for in the past. And that is without a doubt a step in the right direction."

Steve Heisler of The A.V. Club gave the episode a "C" grade and wrote, "One of Entourage's favorite tricks is the ol' bait-and-switch. Maybe it's because the writing has rarely evolved past basic tropes, but this one's been prevalent for all seven seasons—as a grand reveal at the end of an episode. Like tonight, with that comically large bag of "nose candy." Holy crap."

Allyssa Lee of Los Angeles Times wrote, "We've reached the second to last Entourage episode of the season, folks. And while last week saw a lot of posturing and threats, in this episode push really came to shove. Let's put it this way: Sasha wasn't the only one being ganged up on during this half-hour." Eric Hochberger of TV Fanatic gave the episode a 2.5 star rating out of 5 and wrote, "Unfortunately, that was pretty much the only thing good to say about Grey, who continues to make any scene she's in painful. Luckily, Mark Cuban's awkwardness was there to give her competition for the worst actor ever."
