= Motherfucker (disambiguation) =

Motherfucker is an English-language vulgarism.

Motherfucker may also refer to:

- Up Against the Wall Motherfucker, otherwise known simply as The Motherfuckers, a 1960s anarchist group
- "Motherfucker" (Faith No More song), 2014
- "Motherfucker" (Primitive Radio Gods song), 1996
- "Motherfucker" (Robbie Williams song), 2016
- "Motherfucker" (Entourage), a 2011 TV episode
- The Motherfucker, a character from the Kick-Ass 2 comic, 2013
