= One Last Shot =

- Entourage episode
- Episode no.: Season 8 Episode 3
- Directed by: Dan Attias
- Written by: Wesley Nickerson III; Kenny Neibart
- Cinematography by: Todd A. Dos Reis
- Editing by: Jonathan Scott Corn
- Original release date: August 7, 2011
- Running time: 31 minutes

Guest appearances
- Constance Zimmer as Dana Gordon (special guest star); Miguel Sandoval as Carlos (special guest star); Mark Cuban as Himself (special guest star); William Fichtner as Phil Yagoda (special guest star); Jamie Kennedy as Himself (special guest star); Andrew Dice Clay as Himself (special guest star); Kim Coates as Carl Ertz; Blake Anderson as Donny; Breanne Racano as Katie

Episode chronology
← Previous "Out with a Bang"	Next → "Whiz Kid"

"One Last Shot" is the third episode of the eighth season of the American comedy-drama television series Entourage. It is the 91st overall episode of the series and was written by executive story editors Wesley Nickerson III and Kenny Neibart, and directed by Dan Attias. It originally aired on HBO on August 7, 2011.

The series chronicles the acting career of Vincent Chase, a young A-list movie star, and his childhood friends from Queens, New York City, as they attempt to further their nascent careers in Los Angeles. In the episode, Vince reunites with a former producer who dampened his career and tries to help him overcome his drug addiction. Meanwhile, Eric, Drama, and Scott attempt to bring Andrew Dice Clay in line, while Ari goes on a date.

According to Nielsen Media Research, the episode was seen by an estimated 2.36 million household viewers and gained a 1.3 ratings share among adults aged 18–49. The episode received positive reviews from critics, who expressed surprise with the episode's ending.

== Plot ==
At a Narcotics Anonymous meeting, Vince (Adrian Grenier) meets with Carl Ertz (Kim Coates), the same producer who screwed Vince when he was at his lowest point. A recovering addict, Ertz asks Vince's help in resurrecting his career by being part of his new movie idea. Despite their past, Vince agrees to help him as part of the program involves forgiveness.

When Andrew Dice Clay suggests skipping work due to their very low salary, Drama (Kevin Dillon) asks Eric (Kevin Connolly) and Scott (Scott Caan) to help him in solve the problem. Carlos (Miguel Sandoval) tells Turtle (Jerry Ferrara) that he will assign a company to own Avion, praising him for his actions. Turtle is even more disappointed when he learns that Alex is now dating another man. He decides to use his stocks to get his favorite restaurant in the coast. On an advice from Lloyd (Rex Lee), Ari (Jeremy Piven) decides to go on a date with one of Lloyd's friends. However, the friend's roommate ruins their moment and Ari calls Dana (Constance Zimmer) to ask to come over. Dana allows him, and they end up sleeping together.

Despite Yagoda (William Fichtner) warning that test screenings do not always indicate success, Clay refuses to compromise and fires Scott. Annoyed, Yagoda fires Clay from Johnny's Bananas, replacing him with Jamie Kennedy. While Vince wants to help Ertz, Turtle is unconvinced by Ertz, still hating him for their past experience. They visit him at the house, only to realize that Ertz is not interested in Vince's idea and pitches something entirely different. During the argument, Ertz gets angry and locks himself in the bathroom to snort cocaine. As Vince calls him from the other side of the door, an exasperated Ertz opens a drawer, taking out a gun and jamming it to his head. When they hear a gunshot, Vince and Turtle brutally kick the door, horrified at the scene.

== Production ==
=== Development ===
The episode was written by executive story editors Wesley Nickerson III and Kenny Neibart, and directed by Dan Attias. This was Nickerson's first writing credit, Neibart's first writing credit, and Attias' tenth directing credit.

== Reception ==
=== Viewers ===
In its original American broadcast, "One Last Shot" was seen by an estimated 2.36 million household viewers with a 1.3 in the 18–49 demographics. This means that 1.3 percent of all households with televisions watched the episode. This was a 10% increase in viewership with the previous episode, which was watched by an estimated 2.14 million household viewers with a 1.2 in the 18–49 demographics.

=== Critical reviews ===
"One Last Shot" received positive reviews from critics. Steve Heisler of The A.V. Club gave the episode a "B" grade and wrote, "Holy crap, that was intense. Is this still Entourage? I haven't seen a single boobie this entire season, and a guy kills himself in the bathroom after a coke bender?"

Nate Rawlings of TIME wrote, "The standard structure of a three-act drama goes something like this: in the first act, you get your characters stuck in a tree; in the second act, you throw rocks at them; and in the third act, you bring them down. Last night's episode of Entourage blew through the transition between acts I and II and set up for the rock throwing to begin next week." Hollywood.com wrote, "And Ari learns the most important lesson in dating- always date someone old enough to understand your pop cultural references. A shared familiarity with outdated memes is the bedrock on which a relationship is built."

Ben Lee of Digital Spy wrote, "'One Last Shot' is probably the strongest episode of this season yet. Vince's insistence on giving Carl a second chance shows a different side to him, while I dig the dark ending." Renata Sellitti of TV Fanatic gave the episode a 2.5 star rating out of 5 and wrote, "Viewers will also probably be rooting for Vince to get his image back, Drama to get his career back and Lloyd to rule his own pocket square-wearing media empire. Or maybe the last part's just me. Whatever. Regardless, they've now used up almost half of this season getting the ball rolling, and practically ruined this episode by making it Dice top-heavy."
