= Motherfucker (Entourage) =

- Entourage episode
- Episode no.: Season 8 Episode 5
- Directed by: David Nutter
- Written by: Ally Musika
- Cinematography by: Todd A. Dos Reis
- Editing by: Jonathan Scott Corn
- Original release date: August 21, 2011
- Running time: 30 minutes

Guest appearances
- Constance Zimmer as Dana Gordon (special guest star); Beverly D'Angelo as Barbara Miller (special guest star); Alice Eve as Sophia Lear (special guest star); Melinda Clarke as Herself (special guest star); William Fichtner as Phil Yagoda (special guest star); Jamie Kennedy as Himself (special guest star); Andrew Dice Clay as Himself (special guest star); Debi Mazar as Shauna Roberts (special guest star); Cassidy Lehrman as Sarah Gold; Jonathan Keltz as Jake Steinberg

Episode chronology
← Previous "Whiz Kid"	Next → "The Big Bang"

"Motherfucker" is the fifth episode of the eighth season of the American comedy-drama television series Entourage. It is the 93rd overall episode of the series and was written by executive producer Ally Musika, and directed by David Nutter. It originally aired on HBO on August 21, 2011.

The series chronicles the acting career of Vincent Chase, a young A-list movie star, and his childhood friends from Queens, New York City, as they attempt to further their nascent careers in Los Angeles. In the episode, Vince has an interview with Vanity Fair, while Eric is approached by Melinda Clarke for representation. Meanwhile, Ari struggles with his personal life, just as Drama tries to get Andrew Dice Clay to compromise.

According to Nielsen Media Research, the episode was seen by an estimated 2.53 million household viewers and gained a 1.5 ratings share among adults aged 18–49. The episode received generally positive reviews from critics, who praised the storylines.

== Plot ==
Shauna (Debi Mazar) takes Vince (Adrian Grenier) to an interview with Vanity Fair journalist Sophia Lear (Alice Eve), hoping to build a good image after Ertz's suicide. However, the interview goes awry when Vince flirts with Sophia, and she decides to end the interview prematurely. While Vince wants to apologize, Shauna warns him not to do it.

Eric (Kevin Connolly) meets with Melinda Clarke, who just divorced Terrance, into possibly representing her. When Melinda flirts with him, Eric considers to step aside, but Scott (Scott Caan) pressures him in representing her for the company. Unsatisfied with the show's quality, Drama (Kevin Dillon) decides to meet with Andrew Dice Clay to solve the salary problem. He offers to reduce his salary to increase his, but Clay declines as he feels the network must take care of it, also revealing that he needs money to pay his son's college tuition. Drama decides to skip work as well to support Dice and pressure the network. Melissa (Perrey Reeves) drops off the kids with Ari (Jeremy Piven) so he can take them to Disneyland. However, an emergency read derails the plans, and the situation worsens when Dana (Constance Zimmer) is humiliated when the kids say that Melissa dislikes her.

Vince contacts Sophia, promising to make an honest interview with her. He details growing up with women, and how it influenced him to become a good person. While impressed, Sophia still turns down his offer for a date. Ari brings his disappointed children to Melissa, who admonishes him for prioritizing his job over his family, also telling him she will ask for the divorce. A drunk Ari gets a call from Dana, and she decides to join him. Eric reunites with Melinda, and they end up having sex. Eric is then called by Sloan (Emmanuelle Chriqui), who scolds him for sleeping with her ex-stepmother. Eric then realizes that Melinda only slept with him to humiliate Terrance and his family.

== Production ==
=== Development ===
The episode was written by executive producer Ally Musika, and directed by David Nutter. This was Musika's 20th writing credit, and Nutter's eighth directing credit.

== Reception ==
=== Viewers ===
In its original American broadcast, "Motherfucker" was seen by an estimated 2.53 million household viewers with a 1.5 in the 18–49 demographics. This means that 1.5 percent of all households with televisions watched the episode. This was a slight increase in viewership with the previous episode, which was watched by an estimated 2.46 million household viewers with a 1.4 in the 18–49 demographics.

=== Critical reviews ===
"Motherfucker" received generally positive reviews from critics. Steve Heisler of The A.V. Club gave the episode a "B–" grade and wrote, "I've come to view Entourage in the same way I view Burn Notice — as comfort food I can turn on in the background during chores, unless, of course, I'm writing about it for a reputable journalistic institution. So now that we're nearing the end of the show's run, there's a lot of pressure for Doug Ellin (and, to a lesser extent, Mark Wahlberg) to wrap everything up. And this time, it has to be EVERYTHING, even a fabricated Vince storyline that's introduced more than halfway through the season."

Nate Rawlings of TIME wrote, "Since last week's episode of Entourage delivered one of the least surprising 'dramatic' endings in T.V. history, it was surprising this week to see a few twists that put the show back on track toward a respectable conclusion." Frazier Tharpe of Complex wrote, ""Motherfucker" was another strong episode that leaves us more confident about the impending series finale than the season's first few episodes did. In keeping with this year's theme of exploring introspective, sometimes dark storylines, half of the cast opened up and exposed more of their vulnerability than usual. Plus, we finally know what Sloan does for a living: planning parties for charities! The end is near, folks."

Ben Lee of Digital Spy wrote, "It was excellent to see the conniving Melinda Clarke again. One of the highlights of the episode, for sure." Renata Sellitti of TV Fanatic gave the episode a 4 star rating out of 5 and wrote, "I'm curious to see what kind of story comes out of Vince's interview (or if she finally gives in to his advances), and I'm also waiting to see Turtle knock it out of the park with the Don Pepe's project. Entourage is at its best when Ari's cracking skulls, Vince is banging chicks, or Drama's life is melting down. I'd like to see two of those three pan out, but so far so good with this season taking the action in a better direction."
