= Second to Last =

- Entourage episode
- Episode no.: Season 8 Episode 7
- Directed by: Kevin Connolly
- Written by: Ally Musika
- Cinematography by: Rob Sweeney
- Editing by: Jonathan Scott Corn
- Original release date: September 4, 2011
- Running time: 30 minutes

Guest appearances
- Constance Zimmer as Dana Gordon (special guest star); Johnny Galecki as Himself (special guest star); Alice Eve as Sophia Lear (special guest star); Melinda Clarke as Herself (special guest star); William Fichtner as Phil Yagoda (special guest star); Mark Cuban as Himself (special guest star); Amar'e Stoudemire as Himself (special guest star); Michael Strahan as Himself (special guest star); Mark Teixeira as Himself (special guest star); Alex Rodriguez as Himself (special guest star); Sonny Marinelli as John DeLuca; Elizabeth Regen as Gina DeLuca; Jonathan Keltz as Jake Steinberg; Janet Montgomery as Jennie; Rachel Quaintance as Realtor

Episode chronology
← Previous "The Big Bang"	Next → "The End"

"Second to Last" is the seventh episode of the eighth season of the American comedy-drama television series Entourage. It is the 95th overall episode of the series and was written by executive producer Ally Musika, and directed by main cast member Kevin Connolly. It originally aired on HBO on September 4, 2011.

The series chronicles the acting career of Vincent Chase, a young A-list movie star, and his childhood friends from Queens, New York City, as they attempt to further their nascent careers in Los Angeles. In the episode, Turtle finds himself needing more money from his investors, while Drama faces possible repercussions from his strike.

According to Nielsen Media Research, the episode was seen by an estimated 1.72 million household viewers and gained a 1.0 ratings share among adults aged 18–49. The episode received generally positive reviews from critics, who praised the character development in the episode.

== Plot ==
Vince (Adrian Grenier) interviews his exes to say good things about him, planning to make a video for Sophia (Alice Eve). Noticing that Drama (Kevin Dillon) is lamenting his TV film was shelved, Vince offers to help him deal with Yagoda (William Fichtner) if he vouches for him with Sophia. Drama convinces Sophia in watching the video, and she agrees to meet with Vince again.

While Turtle (Jerry Ferrara) finds a place for Don Pepe's, John (Sonny Marinelli) and Gina (Elizabeth Regen) prefer another establishment, as John finds a deep connection with his mother. After an encounter with Dana (Constance Zimmer), Ari (Jeremy Piven) reads the script for Drama's miner film, and is moved by its content. However, he is dismayed when Dana and Lloyd (Rex Lee) report that no studio wants to pick it up, as Yagoda is preventing it. Ari and Vince visit Yagoda at a parlor to convince him, with Yagoda expressing disappointment that Drama betrayed him when he was the only person who believed in Johnny's Bananas. Vince offers to make a donation on his behalf to forgive Drama, and Yagoda agrees.

As the establishment is expensive, Turtle contacts his investors (Amar'e Stoudemire, Michael Strahan, Mark Teixeira and Alex Rodriguez) for more money but they refuse. Turtle laments his situation, especially as his stocks in Avion would've made him millionaire. However, Vince surprises Turtle by revealing that he never sold his stocks after talking with Mark Cuban. Through this, Vince makes $15 million and Turtle makes $4 million. Eric (Kevin Connolly) and Melinda Clarke confront Sloan (Emmanuelle Chriqui) for "dating" Johnny Galecki. During their argument, Eric insults Sloan, causing her to leave and for Galecki to fire him as his agent. Eric visits her at home to apologize, where she reveals that she is pregnant with his baby. Nevertheless, she plans to go back to New York City and does not want him involved.

== Production ==
=== Development ===
The episode was written by executive producer Ally Musika, and directed by main cast member Kevin Connolly. This was Musika's 21st writing credit, and Connolly's second directing credit.

== Reception ==
=== Viewers ===
In its original American broadcast, "Second to Last" was seen by an estimated 1.72 million household viewers with a 1.0 in the 18–49 demographics. This means that 1 percent of all households with televisions watched the episode. This was a 21% decrease in viewership with the previous episode, which was watched by an estimated 2.16 million household viewers with a 1.3 in the 18–49 demographics.

=== Critical reviews ===
"Second to Last" received generally positive reviews from critics. Steve Heisler of The A.V. Club gave the episode a "B–" grade and wrote, "'Second To Last' was clumsy and infuriating, but for whatever reason, I didn't think it was as terrible as some of the other puss that's dripped out from between Ari Gold's luscious man-pillows. Maybe that's because the more the season goes on, the more Ari is growing as a man, a person, a real-life character who is not just filling some role."

Frazier Tharpe of Complex wrote, "Interestingly enough, the stakes for the final episode of the series don't hinge on some big movie deal or other Hollywood business; instead, not one but three romantic, everything-on-the-line showdowns. Even though we think we know how everything will turn out, we still can't wait." Hollywood.com wrote, "With only two more episodes left in the entire series, Entourage finally pulls out the big guns – and by big guns, I mean big ol' crocodile tears. It took eight seasons, but the show finally found an emotional hook."

Ben Lee of Digital Spy wrote, "With the series finale airing next week, it's disappointing that pretty much all the loose ends revolve around people's love lives (Vince, Ari and Eric)." Renata Sellitti of TV Fanatic gave the episode a 4.5 star rating out of 5 and wrote, "And I, for one, am pretty damn excited to see how they're going to tie off this series next Sunday. Here's hoping it's with a big, Lloyd-shaped bow."
