= Bottoms Up (Entourage) =

- Entourage episode
- Episode no.: Season 7 Episode 5
- Directed by: Dan Attias
- Written by: Ally Musika
- Cinematography by: Rob Sweeney
- Editing by: Jeff Groth
- Original release date: August 1, 2010
- Running time: 29 minutes

Guest appearances
- Beverly D'Angelo as Barbara Miller (special guest star); Randall Wallace as Himself (special guest star); Aaron Sorkin as Himself (special guest star); Bob Saget as Himself (special guest star); Stan Lee as Himself (special guest star); Jessica Simpson as Herself (special guest star); Mike Tyson as Himself (special guest star); Sasha Grey as Herself (special guest star); Carla Gugino as Amanda Daniels (special guest star); Autumn Reeser as Lizzie Grant; Jonathan Keltz as Jake Steinberg; Janet Montgomery as Jennie

Episode chronology
← Previous "Tequila Sunrise"	Next → "Hair"

"Bottoms Up" is the fifth episode of the seventh season of the American comedy-drama television series Entourage. It is the 83rd overall episode of the series and was written by executive producer Ally Musika, and directed by Dan Attias. It originally aired on HBO on August 1, 2010.

The series chronicles the acting career of Vincent Chase, a young A-list movie star, and his childhood friends from Queens, New York City, as they attempt to further their nascent careers in Los Angeles. In the episode, Vince starts hanging out with his new girlfriend, Sasha Grey. Meanwhile, Ari tries to prevent Lizzie from stealing his clients, while Drama angrily confronts Bob Saget over stealing his role in the sitcom.

According to Nielsen Media Research, the episode was seen by an estimated 2.85 million household viewers and gained a 1.7/5 ratings share among adults aged 18–49. The episode received generally positive reviews from critics, who praised the character development in the episode.

== Plot ==
At a bar, Vince (Adrian Grenier) hits it off with Sasha Grey, surprising the boys. As they talk over her career, Drama (Kevin Dillon) and Turtle (Jerry Ferrara) tell Eric (Kevin Connolly) he should consider anal sex with Sloan (Emmanuelle Chriqui). Turtle wants Eric to consider investing in the Avion Tequila brand, but Eric is not interested.

Ari (Jeremy Piven) is dismayed upon learning that Lizzie (Autumn Reeser) has contacted many clients from the agency. He loses Jessica Simpson to Lizzie, while also struggling in keeping Mike Tyson as a client. During a meeting with Aaron Sorkin, Ari convinces him in staying by having him meet and flirt with Simpson, and in turn Simpson agrees to stay with the agency. Bob Saget confronts Eric over the sitcom with John Stamos, telling him he wants to star in it. Eric informs Drama, as Saget wants his role. An angered Drama confronts Saget at his house, only to realize that Roger Jay sent the script to other actors. The network proceeds to go ahead with the sitcom starring Saget and Stamos, disappointing Drama.

Vince takes Sasha to his meeting with Randall Wallace and Stan Lee, with Wallace expressing frustration over inviting her. Eric and Sloan try anal sex, but they feel uncomfortable with the situation. Eric is then called by Vince, and is frustrated when he learns he decided to get involved in the Avion Tequila brand without consulting him. Ari receives a call from Amanda Daniels (Carla Gugino), who reveals that Lizzie is now working for her. Lizzie previously asked for a job six months prior, but instead kept a journal while working for Ari, and she promises to use everything against him.

== Production ==
=== Development ===
The episode was written by executive producer Ally Musika, and directed by Dan Attias. This was Musika's 15th writing credit, and Attias' ninth directing credit.

== Reception ==
=== Viewers ===
In its original American broadcast, "Bottoms Up" was seen by an estimated 2.85 million household viewers with a 1.7/5 in the 18–49 demographics. This means that 1.7 percent of all households with televisions watched the episode, while 5 percent of all of those watching television at the time of the broadcast watched it. This was a 10% increase in viewership with the previous episode, which was watched by an estimated 2.58 million household viewers with a 1.6/5 in the 18–49 demographics.

=== Critical reviews ===
"Bottoms Up" received generally positive reviews from critics. Dan Phillips of IGN gave the episode a "great" 8 out of 10 and wrote, "With Eric and Sloane's misadventures in bed rounding out the episode with some uncomfortable (in more ways than one) comedy, "Bottoms Up" delivered a solid half-hour of laughs and dramatic complications. For those of us who spent most of the season's first four episodes wondering if this show was on its last legs, this latest episode, the first winner of the year, was a welcome sight indeed."

Steve Heisler of The A.V. Club gave the episode a "C+" grade and wrote, "despite being the weakest plot thus far, it's the only one with any steam left. E and Scott have made up, what once was Drama's part might be going to Saget because it's called showbusiness not showfriends, Turtle already got Vince to endorse his tequila line, and E prefers the vagina. All that's left is for Turtle and Alex to "make out all night," and the show's pretty much done."

Allyssa Lee of Los Angeles Times wrote, "Everyone was getting some sort of bum deal (for better or for worse) in this episode, cheekily titled “Bottoms Up.” Part of that may have to do with the casting of adult film star Sasha Grey, who arrived this week for a multi-episode arc as Vince’s new bed buddy." Josh Wigler of MTV wrote, "Let's get one thing straight — any episode of Entourage that features Bob Saget, Mike Tyson, Jessica Simpson, Stan Lee and Aaron Sorkin in the same half hour is a very, very good episode of Entourage. It's even better when they're all in the episode for very different reasons."

Rachel Cericola of TV Fodder wrote, "I thought it was a mediocre, yet pretty funny one. It didn't do much to progress the plot forward except for teasing the upcoming, juicy battle between Ari and the Hot Revengeful Agent chicks. But it was definitely the sexiest episode of the year when you include Sasha Grey, Jessica Simpson and a half-naked Mrs. Ari. The cameos from Tyson and Simpson were both solid." Eric Hochberger of TV Fanatic gave the episode a 3.5 star rating out of 5 and wrote, "Overall, the six cameos turned out to be pretty fun and no one stuck out in that painful cameo for no reason way they love to do on this show. Two good episodes in a row? We're hoping this season can keep it up."
