= Mhysa =

- Game of Thrones episode
- Daenerys, center, is hailed by the freed Yunkish as their "mhysa", or mother, as the season closes. The uplifting scene received praise, as well as criticism for alleged colonialistic undertones.
- Episode no.: Season 3 Episode 10
- Directed by: David Nutter
- Written by: David Benioff; D. B. Weiss
- Cinematography by: Robert McLachlan
- Editing by: Oral Norrie Ottey
- Original air date: June 9, 2013
- Running time: 62 minutes

Guest appearances
- David Bradley as Walder Frey; Patrick Malahide as Balon Greyjoy; Michael McElhatton as Roose Bolton; Peter Vaughan as Maester Aemon; Julian Glover as Grand Maester Pycelle; Gwendoline Christie as Brienne of Tarth; Iwan Rheon as Ramsay Snow; Ian McElhinney as Barristan Selmy; Anton Lesser as Qyburn; Hannah Murray as Gilly; Thomas Brodie Sangster as Jojen Reed; Ellie Kendrick as Meera Reed; Gemma Whelan as Yara Greyjoy; Daniel Portman as Podrick Payne; Ed Skrein as Daario Naharis; Kristian Nairn as Hodor; Nathalie Emmanuel as Missandei; Jacob Anderson as Grey Worm; Josef Altin as Pypar; Kerry Ingram as Shireen Baratheon

Episode chronology
← Previous "The Rains of Castamere"	Next → "Two Swords"
- Game of Thrones season 3

"Mhysa" is the third season finale of the American medieval epic fantasy television series Game of Thrones, and its 30th episode overall. Written by executive producers David Benioff and D. B. Weiss, and directed by David Nutter, it originally aired on June 9, 2013 on HBO in the United States.

The episode revolves on the aftermath of the events instigated by "The Red Wedding," in which Tywin Lannister is revealed to be the mastermind behind the massacre — with Walder Frey and Roose Bolton having conspired with the Lannisters against the Starks. As a result, House Frey receives the Seat of Riverrun and Roose Bolton is appointed the new "Warden of the North". Elsewhere, House Greyjoy begins a new military campaign. In the North, Maester Aemon sends out ravens to alert the whole of Westeros about the arrival of the White Walkers. And across the narrow sea, the freed slaves of Yunkai hail Daenerys as their "mhysa", the Old Ghiscari language's word for "mother".

According to Nielsen Media Research, "Mhysa" was seen by 5.4 million household viewers in the United States, a twenty-eight percent increase compared to the second season finale, "Valar Morghulis". After its broadcast, the episode received generally positive reviews from television critics, with some of them addressing its anticlimactic closure of the series' third season, and its establishment of potential storylines for the fourth season, such as through the final scene's "glimmer of hope". The episode received a nomination for a Primetime Emmy Award for Outstanding Cinematography for a Single-Camera Series at the 65th Primetime Creative Arts Emmy Awards.

== Plot ==
=== At the Twins ===
The Stark army is massacred and Robb's mutilated corpse is paraded through the camp. Lord Frey, now in charge of Riverrun, and Roose Bolton, now Warden of the North, discuss recent events and Roose reveals that the Blackfish escaped. Nearby, Arya and Sandor, who witnessed the desecration of Robb's corpse earlier, pass a group of Frey soldiers who are boasting about the event. An enraged Arya suddenly stabs one soldier to death while Sandor kills the others. Arya ponders the potential of the coin given to her by Jaqen H'ghar.

=== In King's Landing ===
Tyrion learns of the Stark murders and warns Tywin that the Northerners will never forget his role. Tywin asserts his authority over Joffrey and orders Tyrion again to impregnate Sansa for the good of the family. He also belittles his son by saying that he was lucky to not be drowned at birth. Meanwhile, Varys offers Shae a sack of diamonds to sail away from King's Landing, but she refuses. Jaime arrives in King's Landing with Brienne, and he visits Cersei.

=== At Dragonstone ===
Stannis informs Davos of Robb's death and Melisandre's plans to sacrifice Gendry. Davos helps Gendry escape and Stannis orders his execution, but Davos protests, presenting Aemon's letter. Melisandre tells Stannis that only he can save the North from the White Walkers and that he will need Davos' help.

=== In the North ===
Ygritte confronts Jon while he is washing his wounds. He confesses his love for her but she says she knew he was an infiltrator all along. Ygritte shoots Jon with three arrows, deliberately only wounding him, before he escapes on his horse and returns to Castle Black.

At the Dreadfort, Theon begs for death and his torturer is revealed as Ramsay Snow, Roose Bolton's bastard son, who renames Theon as 'Reek'.

=== On the Iron Islands ===
At Pyke, Balon receives a letter from Ramsay demanding the Ironborn's withdrawal from the North, along with a box containing Theon's genitals. Balon refuses to negotiate but Yara takes 50 Ironborn to rescue him.

=== At the Wall ===
In the Nightfort, Sam's and Bran's parties meet and Sam realizes that Bran is Jon's brother. Sam warns them and gives them dragonglass weapons and guides them to the passage north. At Castle Black, Sam and Gilly meet Aemon, who sends 44 ravens with messages warning the south of the northern threat.

=== Outside Yunkai ===
The freed slave population are presented to Daenerys, who explains to them that freedom is their birthright and that they must defend and fight to maintain it. Impromptu, the former slaves hail and adore her as their mhysa, which Missandei explains is Old Ghiscari for "mother". She is elevated into the sky as her dragons roam freely.

== Production ==
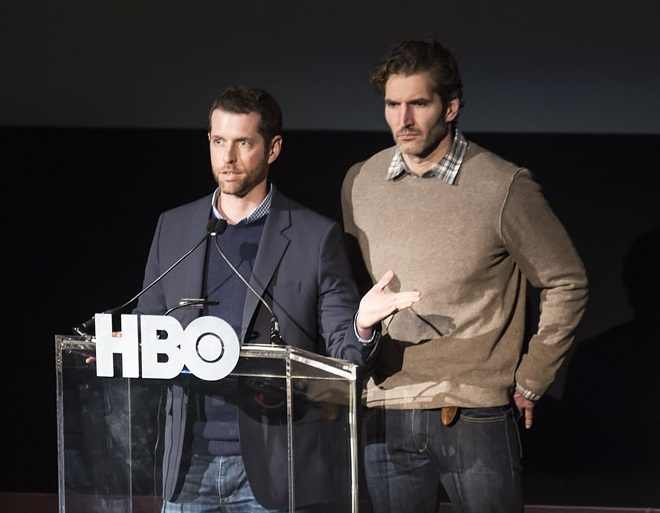
The episode was written by series co-creators David Benioff and D. B. Weiss.

=== Writing ===
"Mhysa" was written by executive producers David Benioff and D. B. Weiss, based on George R. R. Martin's original work from his novel A Storm of Swords. Chapters adapted from A Storm of Swords to the episode were chapters 42, 49, 53 to 55, 57, 63, and 64 (Daenerys IV, Jon VI, Arya XI, Tyrion VI, Davos V, Bran IV, Jaime VII, Davos VI).

=== Casting ===
After being absent for the entire second season, Peter Vaughan returns as Maester Aemon and Josef Altin returns as Pypar. This episode also marks the return, after a long absence, of Patrick Malahide as Balon Greyjoy and Gemma Whelan as Yara Greyjoy.

== Reception ==
=== Ratings ===
In its original American broadcast in HBO, "Mhysa" was seen by an estimated 5.4 million household viewers, according to Nielsen Media Research. It marked a year-to-year increase in viewership of 28 percent compared to the second season finale, "Valar Morghulis", which was seen by 4.2 million. The second broadcast of "Mhysa" during the night was viewed by 900,000 viewers, bringing its total viewership to 6.30 million. According to analysts, the success of the episode significantly helped Game of Thrones to surpass True Blood as the second most-watched series on HBO, after The Sopranos. In the United Kingdom, the episode was viewed by 1.154 million viewers, making it the highest-rated broadcast that week. It also received 0.110 million timeshift viewers.

=== Critical reception ===
"Mhysa" received generally positive reviews from television critics, with some of them addressing the finale's anticlimactic closure of the third season and establishment of new storylines for the fourth. Review aggregator Rotten Tomatoes surveyed 20 reviews of the episode and deemed 100% of them to be positive with an average score of 8.5 out of 10. The website's critical consensus reads, "'Mhysa' wraps up several of season 3's lingering storylines while subtly setting the table for season 4." James Poniewozik of Time wrote in his review, "The end of season 3, then, spent some time among the winners and losers in post-Red-Wedding Westeros, giving the audience a chance to soak in the shock, seethe at the winners' glee, and get a reminder of the larger forces – White Walkers, dragons – well beyond the war between the Lannisters and the Starks. If the Red Wedding seemed to kill hope, 'Mhysa' made clear that it didn't end anything. And it weaved together the many, many threads of GoT's tapestry by returning to a recurring theme: that Game of Thrones is ultimately about family." Matt Fowler of IGN described that the finale had "nicely set up a lot of cool stuff for Season 4, but it was also lacking some of the power and majesty of previous finales. Especially the ending with Dany, who herself had a better ending back in 'And Now His Watch is Ended' when her dragons torched Astapor and she left with a full army." He also praised the scene where Arya killed a Frey soldier. Writing for Today, Drusilla Moorhouse remarked that "After last week's shocking massacre, most fans braced for more tragic deaths in season three's finale. Instead, the blow was softened with poignant reunions and surprising saves, setting the stage for an explosive fourth season."

In her review for Zap2it, Terri Schwartz wrote that "Nothing can ever quite redeem the deaths of Robb and Catelyn Stark, but at least larger forces are taking shape that are propelling this series into Season 4. Daenerys is as powerful as she's ever been, Jon Snow returns to the Wall while Bran heads north of it and the Greyjoys ready an assault to finally save Theon from his captor. Then there's the fact that Stannis decides to sail north to the Wall to aid the Night's Watch in their fight against the White Walkers, which seems like it's going to end up being the greater, global conflict in the future of 'Game of Thrones'." Writing for The A.V. Club, David Sims gave "Mhysa" an "A−" rating, while Emily VanDerWerff gave it a "B+". Sims, writing for audiences who have not read the novels, described the episode as lacking "a lot of serious plot movement or major twists and may have fans gnashing their teeth a little bit as they wait nine months for season four. The previous season finales have also had that quality, but they each ended on a barnstorming note. 'Mhysa', not quite so much." VanDerWerff, writing for audiences who have read the novels, wrote that "On a plot level, not a lot happens in 'Mhysa'", but praised the episode for addressing the season's theme of "what the value of one human life is in the face of a kingdom." She also mildly criticized the series' template of "something terrible happens in Westeros, but Dany offers a glimmer of hope over in her storyline", referring to it as its "Achilles' heel". Kevin Fitzpatrick of ScreenCrush wrote in his review, "All in all, the air (or blood) of the season had mostly been let out by 'The Rains of Castamere', as even a returning Jaime’s most interesting moments arrived much earlier in the season, but 'Mhysa' gave us a good course-heading for season 4, with some much-needed catharsis along the way."

The episode's final scene, in which Daenerys, "the blondest possible savior figure", appears with "uncharacterized brown people" as "[being lifted] up as their messiah and praising her for saving them from bondage", was criticized by at least four commentators as having colonialist or even racist undertones. They asked why the series chose to portray the Yunkish as nearly uniformly dark-skinned, rather than as ethnically diverse as in the source novels, to which George R. R. Martin replied that this was because the scene was shot in Morocco with local extras. Commentators also criticized, more broadly, that the series's inclusion of people of color was limited to only a small number of characters.
