= The Rains of Castamere =

- Game of Thrones episode
- Catelyn Stark after unsuccessfully pleading with Walder Frey to spare the life of her son Robb, seconds before her own death. The scene received critical acclaim.
- Episode no.: Season 3 Episode 9
- Directed by: David Nutter
- Written by: David Benioff; D. B. Weiss
- Cinematography by: Robert McLachlan
- Editing by: Oral Norrie Ottey
- Original air date: June 2, 2013
- Running time: 50 minutes

Guest appearances
- David Bradley as Walder Frey; Mackenzie Crook as Orell; Michael McElhatton as Roose Bolton; Ian McElhinney as Ser Barristan Selmy; Clive Russell as Brynden "Blackfish" Tully; Tobias Menzies as Edmure Tully; Kristofer Hivju as Tormund Giantsbane; Natalia Tena as Osha; Thomas Brodie Sangster as Jojen Reed; Ellie Kendrick as Meera Reed; Hannah Murray as Gilly; Ed Skrein as Daario Naharis; Jacob Anderson as Grey Worm; Nathalie Emmanuel as Missandei; Kristian Nairn as Hodor; Tom Brooke as Lothar Frey; Tim Plester as Black Walder Rivers; Art Parkinson as Rickon Stark; Alexandra Dowling as Roslin Frey; Sean Buckley as the Old Man; Grace Hendy as Marei Frey; Pat McGrath as Hog Farmer; Kelly Long as Joyeuse Frey; Oddie Braddell as Wendel Manderly; Will Champion as a drummer

Episode chronology
← Previous "Second Sons"	Next → "Mhysa"
- Game of Thrones season 3

"The Rains of Castamere" is the ninth and penultimate episode of the third season of HBO's medieval fantasy television series Game of Thrones, and the 29th overall. The episode was written by series creators David Benioff and D. B. Weiss, and directed by David Nutter. It first aired on June 2, 2013.

The episode centers on the wedding of Edmure Tully and Roslin Frey, commonly called "The Red Wedding", during which Robb Stark and his bannermen are massacred. Other storylines include Bran Stark's group having to separate, Jon Snow's loyalties being tested, and Daenerys Targaryen's invasion of the city of Yunkai. The title refers to an in-universe song about the Lannister family, whose lyrics foreshadow the Red Wedding, and which is played by the band at the wedding right before the slaughter begins. The episode achieved a viewership of 5.22 million during its initial airing in the United States.

"The Rains of Castamere" received universal acclaim from critics, with praise being given towards the final "Red Wedding" sequence and the performances, particularly Michelle Fairley. It is widely regarded as one of the best episodes of the series, as well as one of the most harrowing episodes in television history. The episode earned Benioff and Weiss a nomination for the Outstanding Writing for a Drama Series at the 65th Primetime Emmy Awards, and was the recipient of the Hugo Award for Best Dramatic Presentation, Short Form.

This episode marks the final appearances of Richard Madden (Robb Stark), Oona Chaplin (Talisa Stark), and Michelle Fairley (Catelyn Stark).

== Plot ==
=== Beyond the Wall ===
Sam and Gilly continue to travel south. Sam tells Gilly he plans for them to cross the Wall using the entrance at the Nightfort, an abandoned castle to the west of Castle Black.

=== In the North ===
Bran and his group take shelter in an abandoned mill. They see an old horse breeder get captured by Jon's wildling group. Hodor, scared of thunderstorms, begins yelling, which threatens to give away their location. Bran accidentally uses his warg abilities to enter Hodor's mind and subdue him. Orell tells Jon to kill the horse breeder to prove his loyalty, but when he hesitates, Ygritte kills the breeder instead. Tormund realizes that Jon is not loyal to them and orders his men to kill Jon. Bran enters Summer's mind and helps Jon to defeat Tormund's men and Orell. Jon escapes, leaving behind a saddened Ygritte. With dangers ahead, Bran asks Osha and Rickon to leave for Last Hearth, the home of the Umber family.

=== In Yunkai ===
Daario, Jorah, and Grey Worm enter the city and fight several slave guards. The other slaves refuse to fight, leaving Daenerys in control of the city.

=== At the Twins ===
The Stark army arrive at the Twins. Robb apologizes to Walder Frey and his daughters for not keeping his promised betrothal. After Edmure marries Roslin, Walder calls for a bedding ceremony and the couple are taken away. The doors to the hall are then locked as the band begins to play "The Rains of Castamere", a song about the Lannister family. Catelyn realizes that they have been betrayed by Roose Bolton and Walder. The Freys attack, killing many of Robb's bannermen as well as Talisa and her unborn child. Sandor Clegane, travelling to the Twins with Arya Stark, steals a cart of food. That night, they arrive and, despite being turned away by the guards, Arya sneaks in. She witnesses the killing of the Stark soldiers and Robb's direwolf Grey Wind before being recaptured by Sandor. Catelyn threatens to kill Walder's wife, Joyeuse, if he does not let Robb leave, but Walder is indifferent. Robb is stabbed and killed by Roose, who proclaims "the Lannisters send their regards" before murdering him while Catelyn watches in horror. After slashing Joyeuse's throat, Catelyn's own throat is slit by Black Walder Rivers.

== Production ==
=== Writing ===
"The Rains of Castamere" was written by series creators and executive producers David Benioff and D. B. Weiss. The episode adapts material from chapters 41 to 43, 48, and 50 to 53 (Bran III, Jon V, Daenerys IV, Arya IX, Catelyn VI, Arya X, Catelyn VII, and Arya XI) from George R. R. Martin's novel A Storm of Swords.

The episode includes one of the most important plot turns of the series: the betrayal and assassination of the Stark forces during a marriage ceremony in what came to be known as "The Red Wedding". The event culminates in Roose Bolton delivering Jaime Lannister's message from "The Bear and the Maiden Fair", before killing Robb. This tragic turn of events had a profound impact on Benioff and Weiss in their first read of the novels and it was the scene that convinced them to attempt to obtain the rights for a television series.

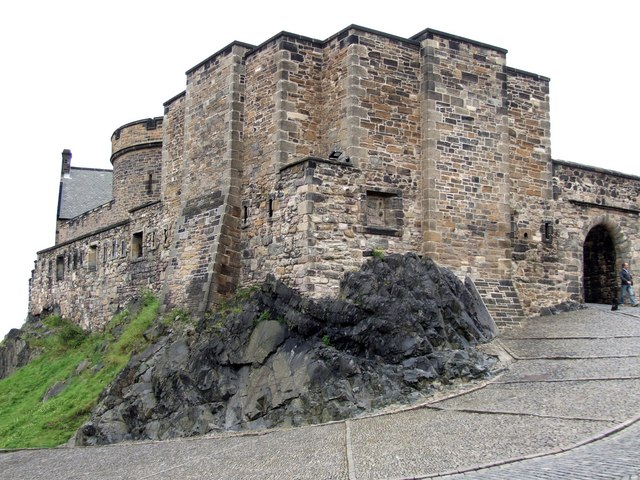
The Red Wedding was inspired by the Black Dinner that took place in 1440 at Edinburgh Castle.

George R. R. Martin conceived the Red Wedding during the earliest stages of the planning of his saga, when he was envisioning a trilogy with the Red Wedding as one of the climactic events at the end of the first of the three books. Martin was particularly inspired by two events in Scottish history. One of them was the 15th century historical event known as the "Black Dinner", where King James II of Scotland invited the chieftains of the powerful Clan Douglas to a feast at Edinburgh Castle. A black bull's head, the symbol of death, was served as the last course of the dinner while a single drum was playing in the background, and the Douglases were murdered. Another event from which the author drew inspiration was the 1692 Massacre of Glencoe, where Clan MacDonald hosted the Campbell Clan, who killed thirty-eight of their hosts overnight.

Martin has said the Red Wedding was the hardest thing he has ever written. He explained that he always tries to envision himself within his characters when writing from their perspective, and develops bonds with them. He even felt attached to the minor characters killed during the massacre. It was so painful for him that he skipped the chapter and continued writing, and only when the rest of the book was finished, he "forced himself" to come back to the dreaded scene. In 2012, at ComicCon he even joked that "he will visit a country with no television when the episode goes on air".

Martin also said he killed off Robb because he believed the audience would assume that the story was about Ned Stark's heir avenging his death, and wished to keep them guessing. Richard Madden suggested Talisa — whose counterpart Jeyne Westerling was not killed in the books — died so Robb's heir could not avenge his death.

=== Casting ===
Will Champion, the drummer and backing vocalist of British rock band Coldplay, has a cameo appearance as one of the musicians who play at the wedding. Olympic champion swimmer Daniel Wiffen and his twin brother Nathan (then aged 12) appeared in the background of the episode during the wedding and their sister Elizabeth played Neyela Frey.

== Reception ==
=== Ratings ===
"The Rains of Castamere" premiered to 5.22 million viewers and received a 2.8 rating in adults 18–49. The second airing was viewed by 1.08 million people, bringing total viewership for the night to 6.30 million. In the United Kingdom, the episode was viewed by 1.013 million viewers, making it the highest-rated broadcast that week. It also received 0.112 million timeshift viewers.

=== Critical reception ===
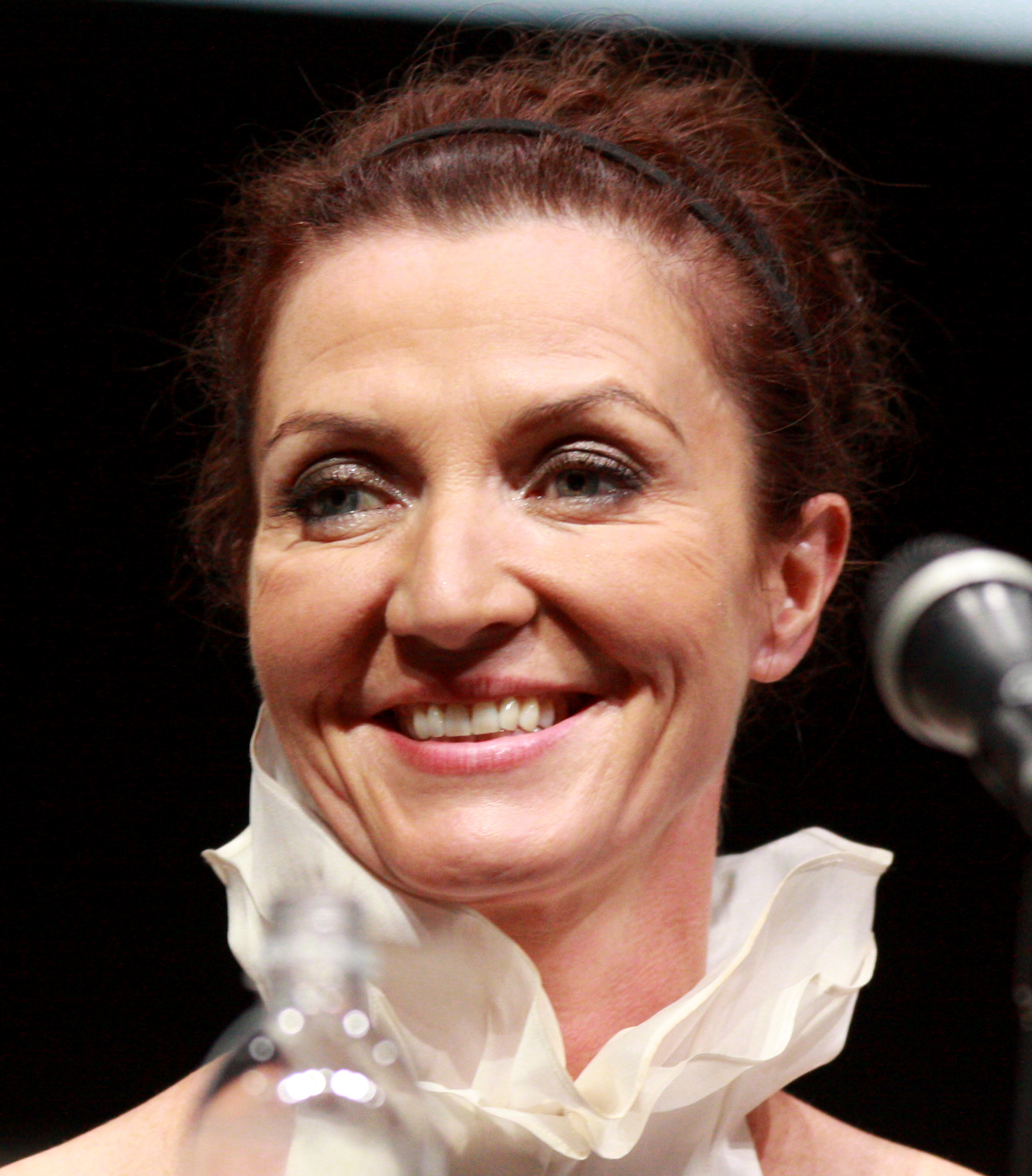
Fairley received widespread critical acclaim for her performance in the episode.

The episode received universal acclaim by critics and is cited as one of the best of the series. On review aggregator website Rotten Tomatoes, it has an approval rating of 100% with an average score of 9.94 out of 10. The website's critical consensus reads, "The most unforgettable episode of Game of Thrones thus far, 'The Rains of Castamere' (or as it shall forever be known, 'The Red Wedding') packs a dramatic wallop that feels as exquisitely shocking as it does ultimately inevitable." The majority of the comments were directed at the massacre at the end of the episode, where high praise was especially directed to Michelle Fairley's performance, leading to the disappointment of many critics when she was not nominated for the Primetime Emmy Award for Outstanding Supporting Actress in a Drama Series at the 65th Primetime Emmy Awards. IGN's Matt Fowler gave the episode a perfect 10/10, calling it "an exquisitely awful event that managed to out-do the unpredictable and horrifying death of Ned Stark back in Season 1". Fowler also said he believed that the episode's depiction of the Red Wedding was more powerful than its depiction in A Song of Ice and Fire.

Writing for The A.V. Club, both David Sims and Emily St. James gave the episode an "A" grade. Sims (writing for people who have not read the novels) expressed shock at the deaths of several main characters, writing, "I don’t think I’ve really processed what I just watched". St. James, who reviews the episodes for people who have read the novels, wrote "If [the reader] doesn’t terribly want to deal with the thought of the deaths of Catelyn and Robb, well, he or she can read that much more quickly. Or he or she can read that much more slowly if there’s a need to process the emotions more fully. On TV, you can't really do that." Reviewing for Forbes, Erik Kain called the episode "one of the best episodes of HBO's dark drama yet", and noted "there was a deeper sense of tragedy knowing [Robb] also lost his unborn child". Sean Collins of the Rolling Stone also praised the episode, and commented on the unusual step the show took in ending one of its central conflicts. Sarah Hughes of The Guardian highlighted the decision to kill Talisa, writing that her "heartbreaking end was unbearable".

"The Rains of Castamere" is considered one of the most shocking episodes in TV history. In 2018, TV Guide picked "The Rains of Castamere" as the third best episode of the 21st century.

=== Viewer reception ===
The episode was also notable for the intense and emotional response it received from viewers, many of whom were unaware of what was about to transpire and had reaction videos filmed by people who had read the book on which it was based. This led to George R. R. Martin giving his personal analysis of the reactions, which he stated were on par with the responses he received from readers of A Storm of Swords. Madden said that he sobbed "very loudly" on an airplane flight right after filming the scene, and that he and Fairley were "both in tears" when they watched the episode.

=== Awards and nominations ===
Year	Award	Category	Nominee(s)	Result	Ref.
2013	Primetime Emmy Awards	Outstanding Writing for a Drama Series	David Benioff and D.B. Weiss	Nominated	
2013	Primetime Creative Arts Emmy Awards	Outstanding Single-Camera Picture Editing for a Drama Series	Oral Norrie Ottey	Nominated	
2013	IGN Awards	Best TV Episode		Nominated	
2013	IGN People's Choice Awards	Best TV Episode		Nominated	
2014	American Cinema Editors	Best Edited One-Hour Series For Non-Commercial Television	Oral Norrie Ottey	Nominated	
2014	Cinema Audio Society Awards	Outstanding Achievement in Sound Mixing - Television Series – One Hour	Ronan Hill, Onnalee Blank, Mathew Waters, and Brett Voss	Won	
2014	Directors Guild of America Award	Outstanding Directorial Achievement in Dramatic Series	David Nutter	Nominated	
2014	Golden Reel Awards	Best Sound Editing — Short Form Dialogue and ADR in Television	Jed Dodge	Won	
2014	Golden Reel Awards	Best Sound Editing — Short Form Music	David Klotz	Won	
2014	Golden Reel Awards	Best Sound Editing — Short Form Sound Effects and Foley	Tim Kimmel	Nominated	
2014	Hugo Awards	Best Dramatic Presentation, Short Form	David Benioff, David Nutter, and D. B. Weiss	Won	

== See also ==
- Clan Douglas
- Massacre of Glencoe
