= David Nutter =

American film and television director

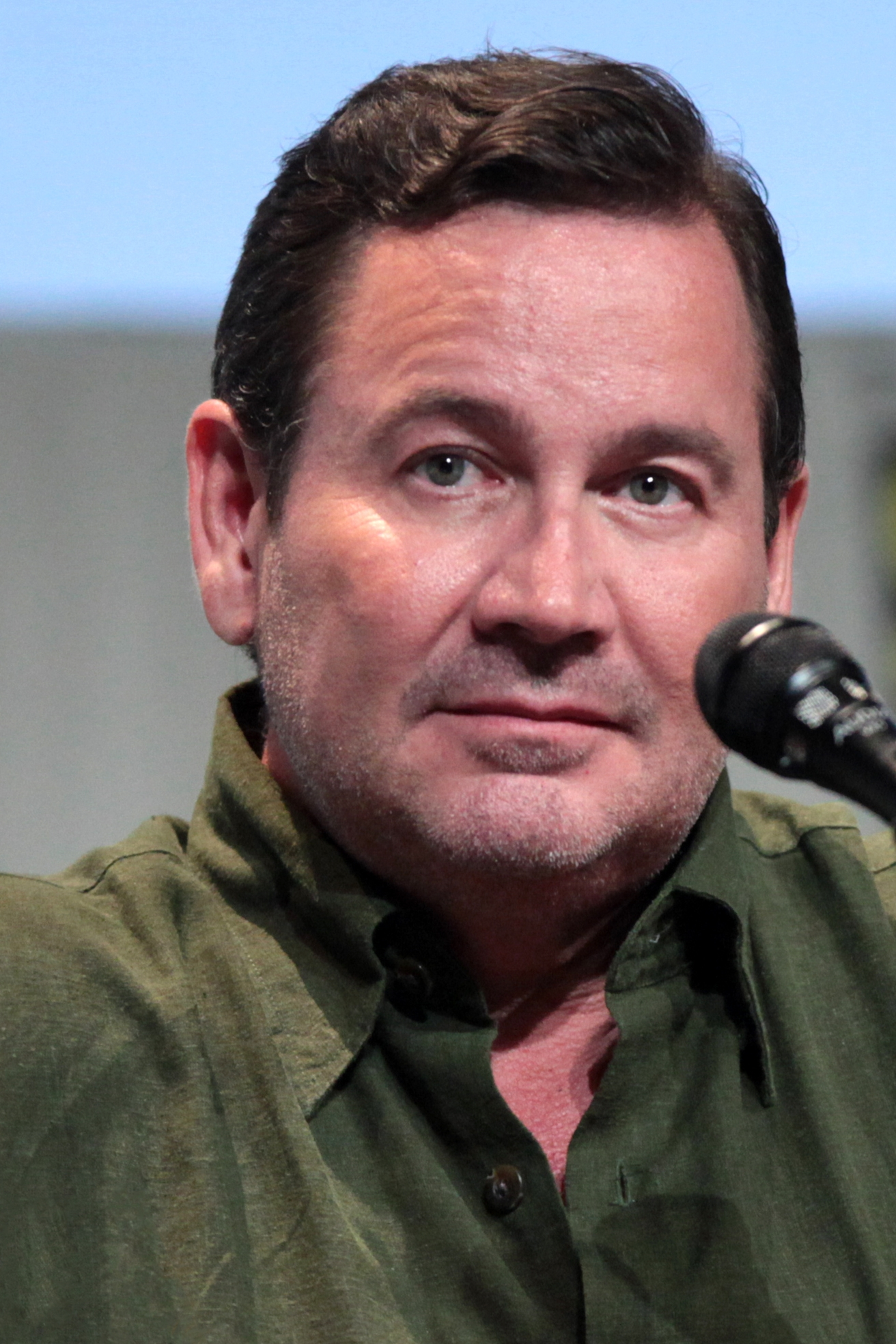
- Nutter at San Diego Comic-Con in July 2015.
- Born: 1960 (age 65–66)
- Education: University of Miami
- Occupations: Television director, film director, television producer
- Years active: 1985–present
- Spouse: Birgit Nutter (m. 1987; died 2019)
- Children: 2

David Nutter (born 1960) is an American television and film director and television producer. He is best known for directing pilot episodes for television. In 2015, he received a Primetime Emmy Award for Outstanding Directing for a Drama Series for his work on the HBO series Game of Thrones.

== Early life and education ==
Nutter was born in 1960. He graduated from Dunedin High School in Dunedin, Florida, in 1978. He subsequently graduated from the University of Miami, where he originally enrolled as a music major.

== Career ==
Nutter started his career directing episodes of Superboy and The X-Files. From there he would go on to direct the pilot and help with the creation of Space: Above and Beyond, Millennium, Sleepwalkers, Roswell, Dark Angel, Smallville, Tarzan, Without a Trace, Dr. Vegas, Jack & Bobby, Supernatural, Traveler, Terminator: The Sarah Connor Chronicles, The Mentalist, and Shameless.

He also directed "Replacements", the fourth part of the mini-series Band of Brothers, and shared in that series's Primetime Emmy Award for Outstanding Directing for a Miniseries, Movie or a Dramatic Special. Other directing highlights include "Join the Club", an Emmy-nominated episode of The Sopranos, and the 1998 feature film Disturbing Behavior.

Nutter directed 10 episodes of the HBO series Entourage, including "The Resurrection", "The Prince's Bride" and the series finale, "The End".

In 2007, Nutter directed Parts 2 and 8 of the mini-series The Pacific, the first spiritual successor to Band of Brothers.

In 2008, LG used Nutter's pilot expertise to create a campaign for its new "Scarlet" line of HDTVs, by creating a promotional clip in the style of a trailer for a TV pilot.

In 2011, Nutter directed the pilot of Rina Mimoun's The Doctor, for CBS.

In 2012, Nutter directed "The Old Gods and the New" and "A Man Without Honor", two episodes of the second season of the HBO series Game of Thrones. In 2013, he directed the last two episodes of the third season: "The Rains of Castamere", which received the Hugo Award for Best Dramatic Presentation, Short Form, and "Mhysa".

Nutter also directed the pilot of The CW series Arrow, based on the comic-book character Green Arrow, starring Stephen Amell.

In 2015, he returned to the series Game of Thrones to direct the last two episodes of the fifth season, "The Dance of Dragons" and "Mother's Mercy". For the latter, he received a Primetime Emmy Award for Outstanding Directing for a Drama Series.

In 2015, Nutter experienced a major injury that required several back surgeries, and had to skip directing any episodes of the next two seasons of Game of Thrones while he recovered.

In September 2017, it was announced that Nutter would return to direct at least two episodes of the eighth season of Game of Thrones, alongside Miguel Sapochnik, David Benioff and D. B. Weiss for the remainder of the episodes. It was later confirmed that Nutter would direct three episodes, which includes the first, second, and fourth episodes of the eighth season.

In May 2021, it was announced that Nutter would direct all six episodes of HBO series, The Time Traveler's Wife.

=== List of directed pilots ===
The first sixteen pilots directed by Nutter all went to series. This streak was broken in 2011 when CBS chose to not pick up Rina Mimoun's The Doctor.

- Space: Above and Beyond (1995)
- Millennium (1996)
- Sleepwalkers (1997)
- Roswell (1999)
- Dark Angel (2000)
- Smallville (2001)
- Without a Trace (2002)
- Dr. Vegas (2004)
- Tarzan (2003)
- Jack & Bobby (2004)
- Supernatural (2005)
- Traveler (2006)
- Terminator: The Sarah Connor Chronicles (2007)
- The Mentalist (2008)
- Eastwick (2009)
- Chase (2010)
- The Doctor (2011)
- Arrow (2012)
- The Flash (2014)
- Deception (2018)

== Personal life ==
Nutter was married to his wife, Birgit, from 1987 until her death from cancer in 2019. They have two children, actress Zoe K. Nutter and Ben Nutter.
