= Rhys Coiro =

American actor (born 1979)

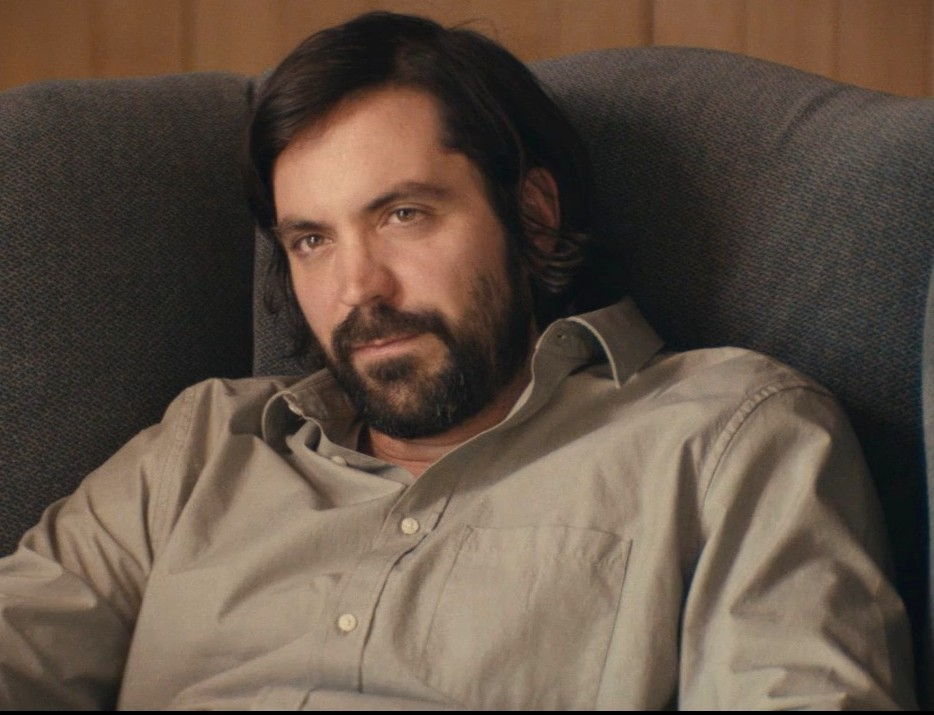
- Coiro in Rust in Peace (2019)
- Born: Rhys John Coiro; March 12, 1979 (age 47); Calabria, Italy
- Education: Carnegie Mellon University (BFA)
- Occupation: Actor
- Years active: 2003–present
- Spouse: Kat Coiro

Rhys John Coiro (born March 12, 1979) is an American actor known for his work in film, television and theater. He is best known for his role as filmmaker Billy Walsh in the HBO series Entourage.

== Early life ==
Coiro was born in Calabria, Italy, and grew up Washington, D.C., New York City, and Upstate New York before his family settled in Princeton, New Jersey, when he was 9 years old. He studied theater at Carnegie Mellon University (CMU) earning a BFA and also trained at the Moscow Art Theatre in Russia.

== Career ==
=== Theater ===
At age 19, Coiro got his first professional gig as an understudy to three roles in the American premiere of Conor McPherson's off-Broadway play This Lime Tree Bower directed by Harris Yulin at Primary Stages.

Within a month of graduating from CMU, Coiro landed the role of Eddie the Bellhop in the Lincoln Center revival of George S. Kaufman's Dinner at Eight, directed by Gerald Gutierrez.

In 2009, Coiro returned to the theatre, starring in a production of Howard Korder's Boys' Life at Second Stage in New York opposite Jason Biggs.

In 2023, Coiro returned to Lincoln Center Theater, originating the role of Noah in the Off-Broadway premiere of The Coast Starlight by Keith Bunin, directed by Tyne Rafaeli.

=== Film & television ===
In 2004, Coiro was cast as filmmaker Billy Walsh in HBO's Entourage. He portrayed the character throughout the show's run.

In 2010, Coiro starred in Slamdance winner Snow and Ashes and in 2011 appeared alongside Alexander Skarsard in Screen Gems' remake of Straw Dogs.

In 2014, Coiro was antagonist to Stevie Van Zandt's character on the final season of Netflix's first original series, the Norwegian mega-hit Lillyhammer and he played one of the original Texas Rangers in The History Channel's mini-series Texas Rising, alongside Ray Liotta, Bill Paxton and Brendan Fraser.

In 2015, Coiro played Armenian gangster Ari Adamian on the final season of USA's Graceland.

In 2017 and 2018, Coiro appeared as a series regular in Unsolved and in arcs on Ray Donovan, The Walking Dead, and S.W.A.T.

In 2019, Coiro appeared opposite Tim Robinson in the "The Bones Are Their Money" musical sketch from I Think You Should Leave with Tim Robinson, which became one of the series' most widely recognized sketches.

In 2022, Coiro made his Marvel Cinematic Universe debut as stage magician Donny Blaze in She-Hulk: Attorney at Law.

In 2024, Coiro appeared as Gotham City councilman Sebastian Hady in HBO's The Penguin.

== Personal life ==
He is married to film director Kat Coiro. They have three children and live in Los Angeles.

== Filmography ==
=== Film ===
Year	Title	Role	Notes
2003	Making Revolution	Italian Activist	
2007	Look	"Ace"	
2007	Mama's Boy	Trip	
2009	The Unborn	Mr. Shields	
2009	Kidnapping Caitlynn	Daniel	
2009	Man Without a Head	Dino	
2010	Snow and Ashes	Blaise Dumas	
2010	High School	Vato	
2010	Order of Chaos	John	
2010	MacGruber	Yerik Novikov	
2010	30 Days of Night: Dark Days	Paul	
2011	A Good Old Fashioned Orgy	Marcus	
2011	Life Happens	Marc	
2011	Straw Dogs	Norman	
2013	Chlorine	Pat	
2013	As Cool as I Am	Ron	
2014	Electric Slide	Glen, The Mormon	
2014	This Last Lonely Place	Sam Taylor	
2014	4 Minute Mile	Eli	
2015	Entourage	Billy Walsh	
2015	Hollywood Adventures	Gary Buesheimer	
2015	Forever	Gordon	
2016	Chronically Metropolitan	The Georgian	
2017	Valley of Bones	Nate	
2017	Dead Ant	Pager	
2018	Gotti	Rudy Pipes	
2019	Finding Steve McQueen	Ray Darrow	
2019	Hustlers	Spencer	
2022	Agent Game	CIA Operative Reese	
2022	One Way	"Coco"	
2022	Who Invited Charlie?	Ray	
2024	Running on Empty	Simon	
2025	Trust	Darren	
TBA	Lear Rex	Oswald	Post-production
TBA	A Great Depression		Post-production

=== Television ===
Year	Title	Role	Notes
2003	One on One	Zorbo Vishanisavik	Guest star
2003, 2007	CSI: Crime Scene Investigation	Kelly James / Reverend's Lawyer	2 episodes
2004–2011	Entourage	Billy Walsh	Recurring character
2005	Six Feet Under	Wolf	Guest star
2005	CSI: Miami	"Diablo"	Guest star
2005	CSI: NY	"Razor"	Guest star
2006	Ugly Betty	Vincent Bianchi	2 episodes: "Queens for a Day", "Fey's Sleigh Ride"
2007	Numb3rs	Ricky Jones	Guest star
2007	Criminal Minds	Ethan	Guest star
2007	Raines	Eddie	Guest star
2007	Tell Me You Love Me	Jaime's Rebound	2 episodes
2009	24	FBI Agent Sean Hillinger	Regular character
2010	Burn Notice	Vince Cutler	Guest star
2010	Dark Blue	Victor	Guest star
2010	Hawaii Five-0	Bradford Matinsky	Guest star
2011–2012	A Gifted Man	Dr. Zeke Barnes	Recurring character
2012	Person of Interest	Jordan Hester	Guest star
2013	Dexter	Andrew Briggs	Episode: "A Beautiful Day"
2013	Longmire	Bill Norquist	Guest star
2013–2014	Hostages	Kramer Delaney	Main cast
2013, 2021	Law & Order: Special Victims Unit	Santiago Morales / Gabe Navarro	2 episodes
2014	Franklin & Bash	"The Bone"	Guest star
2014	Lilyhammer	Tommy Mangano	Recurring character
2015	The Lizzie Borden Chronicles	Chester Phipps	3 episodes
2015	Texas Rising	Vern Elwood	5 episodes
2015	Graceland	Ari Adamian	Recurring character
2017	Ray Donovan	Rob Heard	Recurring character
2017	The Mick	Ip DeLuca	Guest star
2018	Unsolved	Jim Black	Recurring character
2018	Sideswiped	Charlie	Recurring character
2018	S.W.A.T.	Remy	Guest star
2018	The Walking Dead	Jed	4 episodes
2019	I Think You Should Leave	Billy	Episode: "The Bones Are Their Money"
2021	Paradise City	Adam	8 episodes; TV spinoff of American Satan
2022	She-Hulk: Attorney at Law	Donny Blaze	Episode: "Is This Not Real Magic?"
2024	The Spiderwick Chronicles	Richard Grace	2 episodes
2024	The Penguin	Sebastian Hady	2 episodes
2026	Tulsa King	Leonardo Timpone	Season 4
