= Fantasy Island (disambiguation) =

Fantasy Island is an American television series that debuted in 1977 as a television film.

Fantasy Island may also refer to:

== Amusement and water parks ==
- Fantasy Island, Bangladesh, in Uttara (Town), Dhaka, Bangladesh
- Fantasy Island, Singapore, a defunct water park formerly located at Sentosa, Singapore
- Fantasy Island (amusement park), near Skegness, England
- Fantasy Island (LBI), in Beach Haven, New Jersey, United States
- Niagara Amusement Park & Splash World, formerly known as Fantasy Island, in Grand Island, New York, United States

== Music ==
- "Fantasy Island" (M People song), 1997
- "Fantasy Island" (The Millionaires song), 1982, covered by Tight Fit
- "Fantasy Island", a 1981 song by Herb Alpert
- "Fantasy Island", a 1968 song by Tages
- "Fantasy Island", a 1979 song by Freddy Weller
- "Fantasy Island", a 2003 song by Hieroglyphics from the album Full Circle

== Film and television ==
- Fantasy Island (film), a 2020 American supernatural adventure-horror film, based on the series
- Fantasy Island (1998 TV series), an American television series revival of the original 1977 series
- Fantasy Island (2021 TV series), an American television series reboot of the original 1977 series
- "Fantasy Island" (Entourage), an episode of the TV series Entourage

== See also ==
- Fantasilandia, an amusement park in Santiago de Chile
- Phantasialand, an amusement park in Brühl, Rhineland, Germany
- Y'all Is Fantasy Island, a Scottish band
- Phantom island, a false island once thought to exist
- "Island Fantasy", a song by Don Patterson from the album Boppin' & Burnin'
