= Fire Sale =

Fire Sale may refer to:

- Fire sale, a sale of goods at extremely discounted prices
- Fire Sale (film), a 1977 American comedy film starring Alan Arkin
- "Fire Sale" (Super Mario World), a 1991 episode of the animated television series Super Mario World
- "Fire Sale" (Entourage), an episode of the 2004 American comedy-drama television series Entourage
- Fire Sale, a 2013 exhibition of art by Robert Del Naja of the band Massive Attack
- "Fire sale", a fictional cyberattack in the 2007 film Live Free or Die Hard
- Fire Sale (band), an American band made up of former members of the Ataris and Face to Face
