= The Young and the Stoned =

- Entourage episode
- Episode no.: Season 4 Episode 9
- Directed by: Mark Mylod
- Written by: Dusty Kay
- Cinematography by: Anthony Hardwick
- Editing by: David Rogers
- Original release date: August 12, 2007
- Running time: 29 minutes

Guest appearances
- Anna Faris as Herself (special guest star); Cassidy Lehrman as Sarah Gold; Xavier Enrique Torres as Javier; Michael Patrick McGill as Cop; Eric Lange as Director; Kelly Kruger as Lori; Mimi Paley as Lori and Morgan's Friend; Melissa Ordway as Morgan

Episode chronology
← Previous "Gary's Desk"	Next → "Snow Job"

"The Young and the Stoned" is the ninth episode of the fourth season of the American comedy-drama television series Entourage. It is the 51st overall episode of the series and was written by supervising producer Dusty Kay, and directed by co-producer Mark Mylod. It originally aired on HBO on August 12, 2007.

The series chronicles the acting career of Vincent Chase, a young A-list movie star, and his childhood friends from Queens, New York City, as they attempt to further their nascent careers in Los Angeles. In the episode, Eric has a chance encounter with Anna Faris, while Turtle tries to get marijuana for a party. Meanwhile, Ari tries to prevent Melissa from returning to her soap opera.

According to Nielsen Media Research, the episode was seen by an estimated 2.86 million household viewers and gained a 1.8 ratings share among adults aged 18–49. The episode received generally positive reviews from critics, who praised the focus on Melissa, although they criticized the pacing and disjointed subplots.

== Plot ==
As he tries to arrive at their new house, Eric (Kevin Connolly) has his car rear-ended accidentally by Anna Faris. She gives him her phone number to pay for the damages, although Eric believes they shared "a little moment", which is dismissed by the boys. Eric also finds that the number that Faris provided does not work.

Melissa (Perrey Reeves) is asked to reprise her role from The Young and the Restless for the 35th anniversary. Ari (Jeremy Piven) disapproves, joking that Melissa would look ugly on the show's high-definition. After learning that she is set to kiss a character whom she babysit years ago, he visits the set to dissuade her, but she angrily dismisses him. He then bribes the actor in not kissing Melissa by promising a new role, but his plan is discovered, and Melissa decides to kiss the actor nevertheless. Melissa and Ari have a heated argument, with Melissa claiming she does not regret leaving the show, as she only cared that Ari found her ugly. When Ari reiterates he still loves her, they reconcile.

Preparing for a party hosted by Vince (Adrian Grenier), Turtle (Jerry Ferrara) desperately tries to find new marijuana for his party. After acquiring it, he leaves with three girls from the supermarket, although he is almost arrested by a police officer on his way to the party. Eric uses contacts to find Faris and schedule a meeting, where she asks for his opinion on a script she has considered. He gives a blunt opinion on the script, which wins her over and she decides to go dining with her. Eric expects things to go romantic, but it is actually Faris asking him to become her manager.

== Production ==
=== Development ===
The episode was written by supervising producer Dusty Kay, and directed by co-producer Mark Mylod. This was Kay's first writing credit, and Mylod's eighth directing credit.

== Reception ==
=== Viewers ===
In its original American broadcast, "The Young and the Stoned" was seen by an estimated 2.86 million household viewers with a 1.8 in the 18–49 demographics. This means that 1.8 percent of all households with televisions watched the episode. This was a 9% increase in viewership from the previous episode, which was watched by an estimated 2.61 million household viewers with a 1.5 in the 18–49 demographics.

=== Critical reviews ===
"The Young and the Stoned" received generally positive reviews from critics. Ahsan Haque of IGN gave the episode a "great" 8.2 out of 10 and wrote, "The combination of a couple of cleverly subtle plot advances with the general whimsical craziness of Ari, as well as the continued progression of Eric's rise to credibility, helped make this episode an important part of the ongoing storyline."

Alan Sepinwall wrote, "Once again, we have one of the boys (this time Turtle) seemingly getting into trouble and then escaping consequence-free, and once again we have Ari operating completely independently of the guys. I like Mrs. Ari to a point, but how does Doug Ellin not recognize that Ari (and the show) is so much funnier when he's running around trying to extinguish the many different fires that Vince is setting to his career?" Adam Sternbergh of Vulture wrote, "As E says to Faris of an upcoming project, “If it was just a regular romantic comedy, I'd say, ‘Okay, it’s cute.’ But it's not. It tries to be so much more. When movies do that, it pisses me off.” Ladies and gentlemen, the Entourage manifesto: It will never, ever try to be so much more." Trish Wethman of TV Guide wrote, "Apparently, our favorite power agent prefers his woman home tending to the kids and his every whim. I love that they have given Perrey Reeves so much more to do this season because she is such a good foil for Jeremy Piven."

Paul Katz of Entertainment Weekly wrote, "How appropriate that tonight's episode, The Young and the Stoned, aired in August. This show was hot! There was the burn of fear when Turtle got pulled over by the LAPD, the smoky allure of another pretty L.A. floozy willing to hook up with Vince, the fiery embarrassment E felt when guest star Anna Faris blew him off, and the searing, magma-degree hotness that was Mrs. Ari." Jonathan Toomey of TV Squad wrote, "Once again, another episode that didn't really have anything major going on. It was good though. It had some funny story lines and kept up with this trend of character development."

Perrey Reeves submitted this episode for consideration for Outstanding Supporting Actress in a Comedy Series at the 60th Primetime Emmy Awards.
