= Gary's Desk =

- Entourage episode
- Episode no.: Season 4 Episode 8
- Directed by: Julian Farino
- Written by: Ally Musika
- Cinematography by: Rob Sweeney
- Editing by: Rick Weis
- Original release date: August 5, 2007
- Running time: 26 minutes

Guest appearances
- Gary Busey as Himself; Peter Jackson as Himself; Mary J. Blige as Herself; Debi Mazar as Shauna Roberts; Jason Sklar as Jeff Jensen; Randy Sklar as Jim Jensen; Rachel Roberts as Monika; Yvette Nicole Brown as Variety Agent; Tara Karsian as SAG Woman; Kate Albrecht as Christy; Andy Daly as Chris; Stephanie Venditto as Jackie; Tim Maculan as Antique Dealer; Stephanie Vogt as Liz

Episode chronology
← Previous "The Day Fuckers"	Next → "The Young and the Stoned"

"Gary's Desk" is the eighth episode of the fourth season of the American comedy-drama television series Entourage. It is the 50th overall episode of the series and was written by Ally Musika, and directed by Julian Farino. It originally aired on HBO on August 5, 2007.

The series chronicles the acting career of Vincent Chase, a young A-list movie star, and his childhood friends from Queens, New York City, as they attempt to further their nascent careers in Los Angeles. In the episode, Eric tries to prove himself as a manager, while Vince, Drama and Turtle try to get a valuable desk for his new office. Meanwhile, Ari has to fix problems at his agency when two twin secretaries start dampening his businesses.

According to Nielsen Media Research, the episode was seen by an estimated 2.61 million household viewers and gained a 1.5 ratings share among adults aged 18–49. The episode received generally positive reviews from critics, although there was criticism for the pacing.

== Plot ==
Eric (Kevin Connolly) gets a new office, where he will take calls for Vince (Adrian Grenier) as his agent. Vince, Drama (Kevin Dillon) and Turtle (Jerry Ferrara) decide to get him a gift for the office, by buying a very expensive desk previously used by Robert De Niro.

Ari (Jeremy Piven) prepares for a meeting with Mary J. Blige, but his twin secretaries, Jeff and Jim Jensen (Sklar Brothers), are ruining their other meetings after Jeff slept with Jim's wife. When they are unable to put aside their differences, he is forced to fire one of them. While he considers firing Jeff, he decides to fire Jim for his worse performance at the agency. However, Blige decides to drop the agency as she got along with Jim, so Ari fires Jeff as well. The boys discover that the desk was just purchased by Gary Busey, with whom they already faced years ago. Busey agrees in giving the desk, but he uses Drama as a painting tool against his will.

Eric decides to buy an advertisement spot in Variety, but he makes a poor impression as he only represents Vince. Awaiting to finally get to meet Peter Jackson for a project, he asks Shauna (Debi Mazar) to help him schedule an interview with a Variety reporter. However, Eric's interview goes poorly, and the article highlights him as a product of nepotism unable to get past Vince's shadow. To help him, the boys decide to get Eric a better office with his new desk, where they will be closer. Eric is then called by Jackson, who wants to work with him on his new project.

== Production ==
=== Development ===
The episode was written by Ally Musika, and directed by Julian Farino. This was Musika's second writing credit, and Farino's 21st directing credit.

== Reception ==
=== Viewers ===
In its original American broadcast, "Gary's Desk" was seen by an estimated 2.61 million household viewers with a 1.5 in the 18–49 demographics. This means that 1.5 percent of all households with televisions watched the episode. This was a slight increase in viewership from the previous episode, which was watched by an estimated 2.50 million household viewers with a 1.4/4 in the 18–49 demographics.

=== Critical reviews ===
"Gary's Desk" received generally positive reviews from critics. Ahsan Haque of IGN gave the episode a "great" 8 out of 10 and wrote, "For the second week in a row, we are given a break from the ongoing Medellin saga. While it felt like a refreshing change of pace in the previous episode, this time around it would have been nice to have some reminder of how the storyline with Walsh and the film is progressing."

Alan Sepinwall wrote, "Self-contained Ari subplots don't work, even one that's more work-related than the stuff with his kids' private school, Gary Busey was funnier the last time he was on, and once again there's a lot of hand-wringing about the Variety story and everything works out fine in the end. Meh. M-E-H, meh." Adam Sternbergh of Vulture wrote, "As long as Ari's the main wheel that's spinning, the show's going to be watchable. But Entourage has the curious aura of a series that's both at the apex of its acclaim and that's run plum out of ideas." Trish Wethman of TV Guide wrote, "This season has been a real roller-coaster ride in terms of quality, but tonight's episode was most definitely a high point in my book."

Paul Katz of Entertainment Weekly wrote, "Ah, the best-laid plans. Tonight's episode, Gary's Desk, focused on the fact that no matter how well plans are made, other people will always screw them up." Jonathan Toomey of TV Squad wrote, "If Drama agrees, Vince can buy the antique Robert DeNiro desk from Gary. Then Eric can have a normal office. Ridiculous... I know, but watching Busey fling sky-blue paint all over Johnny's face was probably the funniest part of the episode."

Julian Farino submitted this episode for consideration for Outstanding Directing for a Comedy Series at the 60th Primetime Emmy Awards.
