= Snow Job (Entourage) =

- Entourage episode
- Episode no.: Season 4 Episode 10
- Directed by: Ken Whittingham
- Written by: Doug Ellin; Ally Musika
- Cinematography by: Anthony Hardwick
- Editing by: Gregg Featherman
- Original release date: August 19, 2007
- Running time: 30 minutes

Guest appearances
- John Heard as Richard Wimmer (special guest star); Anna Faris as Herself (special guest star); Rhys Coiro as Billy Walsh; Constance Zimmer as Dana Gordon; A. J. Buckley as Dave; Michelle Lombardo as Catherine; Robin Atkin Downes as Photoshoot Director

Episode chronology
← Previous "The Young and the Stoned"	Next → "No Cannes Do"

"Snow Job" is the tenth episode of the fourth season of the American comedy-drama television series Entourage. It is the 52nd overall episode of the series and was written by series creator Doug Ellin and story editor Ally Musika, and directed by Ken Whittingham. It originally aired on HBO on August 19, 2007.

The series chronicles the acting career of Vincent Chase, a young A-list movie star, and his childhood friends from Queens, New York City, as they attempt to further their nascent careers in Los Angeles. In the episode, Ari and Dana try to salvage Billy Walsh's script project, while Eric deals with Anna Faris and her boyfriend.

According to Nielsen Media Research, the episode was seen by an estimated 2.77 million household viewers and gained a 1.8/5 ratings share among adults aged 18–49. The episode received extremely positive reviews from critics, who praised the new storylines and humor.

== Plot ==
Dana (Constance Zimmer) contacts Ari (Jeremy Piven) about their deal with Billy (Rhys Coiro), who wrote an incomprehensible script set in a farm in 2075, heavily deviating from the original book. Ari angrily confronts Billy over the adaptation, as he even changed the film's title to Silo. Despite Ari's warning that he could be blacklisted from the industry, Billy is unmotivated to change his idea.

Eric (Kevin Connolly) continues seeing Anna Faris, accompanying her during a photoshoot. However, Eric feels threatened by Faris' boyfriend, Dave (A. J. Buckley), who is suspicious of his motives. Dave constantly minimizes Faris' work, as he is angry that his pilot was rejected by The CW. After Eric tries to calm him, Dave angrily leaves the set. Eric chases him, although Dave is now convinced he is romantically interested in Faris. They return to the photoshoot, where Dave accuses Eric of trying to steal Faris from him. Faris decides to break up with Dave, who angrily leaves.

While Ari tries to salvage the new film, he is surprised when Vince (Adrian Grenier), Drama (Kevin Dillon) and Turtle (Jerry Ferrara) love the script, and Vince is confident he has a new hit in his hands. Ari rushes to meet with Dana's boss, Richard Wimmer (John Heard), trying to get him to greenlight Silo. Wimmer accepts as he believes it will be a summer blockbuster, warning Dana and Ari if the project falls apart. Ari and the boys inform Eric of the project, who has been out of the loop for the past hours.

== Production ==
=== Development ===
The episode was written by series creator Doug Ellin and story editor Ally Musika, and directed by Ken Whittingham. This was Ellin's 32nd writing credit, Musika's third writing credit, and Whittingham's fifth directing credit.

== Reception ==
=== Viewers ===
In its original American broadcast, "Snow Job" was seen by an estimated 2.77 million household viewers with a 1.8/5 in the 18–49 demographics. This means that 1.8 percent of all households with televisions watched the episode, while 5 percent of all of those watching television at the time of the broadcast watched it. This was a slight decrease in viewership from the previous episode, which was watched by an estimated 2.86 million household viewers with a 1.8 in the 18–49 demographics.

=== Critical reviews ===
"Snow Job" received extremely positive reviews from critics. Ahsan Haque of IGN gave the episode an "amazing" 9.2 out of 10 and wrote, "After a few seemingly unrelated self-contained episodes, the ongoing Walsh, Vince and Eric storyline returns with a bang in this week. Of the four friends, Eric's always been portrayed as the sane realist, and if there ever was a time that a sanity check was needed, it was in this episode. With Walsh taking some drastic liberties with the screenplay for the latest project, "Lost in the Clouds," Ari has to scramble the best of his obnoxious spinning charm to set things right."

Alan Sepinwall wrote, "I know it's just masochism to expect anything else from the show by now - wish-fulfillment is what they do, and the only thing they're interested in doing - but I'm barely even amused by Ari's plate-spinning anymore because I know nothing's going to get broken." Adam Sternbergh of Vulture wrote, "This week's episode, "Snow Job," is delightfully chock-full of vintage Ari, and delightfully free of Turtle and Drama. In a related story, it's the best episode of the season." Trish Wethman of TV Guide wrote, "Entourage delivered a slam dunk with an episode that was fast-paced, funny and well crafted. With only two episodes left, I hope they keep it up."

Paul Katz of Entertainment Weekly wrote, "After several stand-alone episodes, Entourage returned to the land of scripts, studios, and Wally Balls. And none too soon, with only a pair of episodes left in the season." Jonathan Toomey of TV Squad wrote, "This episode did what we like to call "advance the plot." Remember the plot? This show had one at one point, and as much as I've enjoyed the past few episodes exploring E's choices, I'm glad we finally got back to what the show is all about: Vince's career."

Anna Faris submitted this episode for consideration for Outstanding Guest Actress in a Comedy Series at the 60th Primetime Emmy Awards.
