= The Cannes Kids =

- Entourage episode
- Episode no.: Season 4 Episode 12
- Directed by: Mark Mylod
- Written by: Doug Ellin
- Cinematography by: Rob Sweeney
- Editing by: Gregg Featherman
- Original release date: September 2, 2007
- Running time: 35 minutes

Guest appearances
- Maury Chaykin as Harvey Weingard (special guest star); Adam Goldberg as Nick Rubenstein (special guest star); Rhys Coiro as Billy Walsh; Constance Zimmer as Dana Gordon; Assaf Cohen as Yair Marx; Brandon Quinn as Tom; Julia Levy-Boeken as Jacqueline; William Abadie as Hotel Manager; Philippe Bergeron as Press Moderator

Episode chronology
← Previous "No Cannes Do"	Next → "Fantasy Island"

"The Cannes Kids" is the twelfth episode and season finale of the fourth season of the American comedy-drama television series Entourage. It is the 54th overall episode of the series and was written by series creator Doug Ellin, and directed by co-producer Mark Mylod. It originally aired on HBO on September 2, 2007.

The series chronicles the acting career of Vincent Chase, a young A-list movie star, and his childhood friends from Queens, New York City, as they attempt to further their nascent careers in Los Angeles. In the episode, the boys arrive at Cannes for the premiere of Medellín and to recoup their investment.

According to Nielsen Media Research, the episode was seen by an estimated 2.19 million household viewers and gained a 1.2/4 ratings share among adults aged 18–49. The episode received mixed reviews from critics, who both praised and criticized the closure to the Medellín arc.

== Plot ==
At Cannes, the boys prepare to set up at the hotel. There, they run into Prince Yair (Assaf Cohen), who is now serious about acquiring films and is interested in buying Medellín. At a private meeting, Yair offers to buy the film for $35 million despite not having seen it, which would allow them to recoup the entire budget. While tempted, Ari (Jeremy Piven) is not convinced that Yair can provide the distribution they are looking for.

Drama (Kevin Dillon) is annoyed that his hotel room is unavailable, despite the fact that he had it booked for months. Visiting Yair's yacht party, he meets a woman named Jacqueline (Julia Levy-Boeken), and immediately bonds with her due to the popularity of his series, Viking Quest. But his situation worsens when he is kicked out of the hotel and loses contact with Jacqueline, depressing him. At a party, the boys run into Harvey (Maury Chaykin), who threatens them over any of their upcoming bidding offers. Ari also meets with Dana (Constance Zimmer), trying to get her involved as a potential buyer. Ari also has to deal with Nick (Adam Goldberg), who wants to recoup his investment while he serves house arrest.

Before the premiere, Dana offers $28 million for Medellín, prompting Vince (Adrian Grenier) and Eric (Kevin Connolly) to forfeit their money in getting her to accept the offer. As the boys toast, Ari calls Nick to inform him, only to realize that he already accepted a $75 million offer from Yair. At the premiere, Drama reunites with Jacqueline and decides to skip the premiere to spend the day with her. While the boys are confident on the film's prospects, the film is poorly received and booed by the audience. Dana is happy to not accept the deal, while Yair decides to back out from his offer as he never signed anything. Harvey then offers to buy the film for only one dollar, which Ari reluctantly accepts as the film will be re-edited. As they leave, they join bystanders in watching Drama having sex with Jacqueline on the beach.

== Production ==
=== Development ===
The episode was written by series creator Doug Ellin, and directed by co-producer Mark Mylod. This was Ellin's 34th writing credit, and Mylod's ninth directing credit.

== Reception ==
=== Viewers ===
In its original American broadcast, "The Cannes Kids" was seen by an estimated 2.19 million household viewers with a 1.2/4 in the 18–49 demographics. This means that 1.2 percent of all households with televisions watched the episode, while 4 percent of all of those watching television at the time of the broadcast watched it. This was a 29% decrease in viewership from the previous episode, which was watched by an estimated 3.06 million household viewers with a 1.9 in the 18–49 demographics.

=== Critical reviews ===
"The Cannes Kids" received mixed reviews from critics. Ahsan Haque of IGN gave the episode an "okay" 6.5 out of 10 and wrote, "Now we know Entourage is supposed to be a comedy, but the Cannes unveiling of Medellin was a pivotal moment that was brewing for many episodes, and this ending didn't feel very rewarding. Overall, there were a few memorable moments, but as a season finale, "The Cannes Kids" simply failed to deliver on the buildup leading to this episode."

Adam Sternbergh of Vulture wrote, "The big question is whether the crew can sell Medellin, which means only two possible outcomes: The movie's brilliant and the season ends in triumph and Champagne, or the movie stinks and the season ends in ignominy. This being Entourage, you’d be smart to bet on the former, but give the producers credit for pulling off an upset. Sort of." Matt Mitovich of TV Guide wrote, "In the end, they were forced to take the absolute littlest offer and while that was a bit sad, I prefer that finale to a truly happy, $75-million outcome. It was somewhat validating to see Medellin actually pegged as the crap it appeared to be in the fleeting glimpses we got over the past season. To have had the Cannes crowd come forth, unified, and proclaim Vince sporting bad prosthetics and worse acting to be the bee's knees would have been very tough to swallow."

Paul Katz of Entertainment Weekly wrote, "All in all, an episode that had blasts from the past, tons of cash, and an eagerly anticipated movie that crashed." Jonathan Toomey of TV Squad wrote, "To be honest, it felt anti-climactic to me if only because this was exactly what I've been expecting. This was the only logical outcome. Everything always comes up roses for this crew. They needed a reality check and this proved to be the perfect vehicle for it."

Adam Goldberg submitted this episode for consideration for Outstanding Guest Actor in a Comedy Series at the 60th Primetime Emmy Awards.
