= No Cannes Do =

- Entourage episode
- Episode no.: Season 4 Episode 11
- Directed by: Dan Attias
- Written by: Doug Ellin; Rob Weiss
- Cinematography by: Rob Sweeney
- Editing by: Rick Weis
- Original release date: August 26, 2007
- Running time: 29 minutes

Guest appearances
- Sydney Pollack as Himself (special guest star); Kanye West as Himself (special guest star); Anna Faris as Herself (special guest star); Rhys Coiro as Billy Walsh; Brandon Quinn as Tom; Tom Virtue as Pilot; Holly Wortell as Airline Worker

Episode chronology
← Previous "Snow Job"	Next → "The Cannes Kids"

"No Cannes Do" is the eleventh episode of the fourth season of the American comedy-drama television series Entourage. It is the 53rd overall episode of the series and was written by series creator Doug Ellin and executive producer Rob Weiss, and directed by Dan Attias. It originally aired on HBO on August 26, 2007.

The series chronicles the acting career of Vincent Chase, a young A-list movie star, and his childhood friends from Queens, New York City, as they attempt to further their nascent careers in Los Angeles. In the episode, the boys prepare to leave for the Cannes Film Festival, but face multiple challenges when their flight is delayed.

According to Nielsen Media Research, the episode was seen by an estimated 3.06 million household viewers and gained a 1.9 ratings share among adults aged 18–49. The episode received generally positive reviews from critics, with particular praise towards West's guest appearance. For the episode, Dan Attias received a nomination for Outstanding Directing for a Comedy Series at the 60th Primetime Emmy Awards.

== Plot ==
The boys prepare to leave with Billy (Rhys Coiro) and Ari (Jeremy Piven) for Cannes. Meeting Anna Faris, Billy decides to cast her in Clouds and rewrite the script to accommodate her. However, LAX is closed down due to a Red Alert, delaying their flight. As they await, Billy instructs Eric (Kevin Connolly) to arrange a meeting with Faris.

Faris is given the script, but she is confused over the tone and the fact that Billy wrote it in haiku. She is unconvinced over taking the role, but Vince (Adrian Grenier) makes Eric in getting her signed. Eric lies that the script will make sense in the end, but he eventually comes clean and admits the script is bad. Ari feels pressured in finding a private jet, just as Melissa (Perrey Reeves) and Lloyd (Rex Lee) are arguing over accompanying him to Cannes. He eventually finds a jet, but is already booked by Sydney Pollack. He calls Pollack and convinces him in letting the boys accompany him.

As Eric stays to explain the situation to Faris, the boys and Ari leave for the plane. However, they are notified that there are only five available seats and one of them must stay. They decide to not leave on the flight, just as Eric arrives. Suddenly, they meet with Kanye West at the waiting area. While West is heading for London, he agrees in letting go in his plane for Cannes. Before leaving, Ari talks with Melissa to express his regret and asking her to come with him, but she allows him to go with the boys.

== Production ==
=== Development ===
The episode was written by series creator Doug Ellin and executive producer Rob Weiss, and directed by Dan Attias. This was Ellin's 33rd writing credit, Weiss' 16th writing credit, and Attias' eighth directing credit.

== Reception ==
=== Viewers ===
In its original American broadcast, "No Cannes Do" was seen by an estimated 3.06 million household viewers with a 1.9 in the 18–49 demographics. This means that 1.9 percent of all households with televisions watched the episode. This was a 10% decrease in viewership from the previous episode, which was watched by an estimated 2.77 million household viewers with a 1.8 in the 18–49 demographics.

=== Critical reviews ===
"No Cannes Do" received generally positive reviews from critics. Ahsan Haque of IGN gave the episode a "good" 7.8 out of 10 and wrote, "This episode served primarily as a buildup for the finale, and as such, doesn't stand well on its own. The filler stories featuring Turtle and Drama were uninteresting, and there was little payoff with the Ari, wife, and Lloyd storyline. Fortunately, the Kanye West cameo was excellent, and Eric's moments were highly entertaining and helps add to the anticipation for the finale."

Alan Sepinwall wrote, "Well, at least the writers had Vince acknowledge that everything always works out fine for him, but it wasn't funny the way it was when Jerry Seinfeld did it in "The Opposite."" Adam Sternbergh of Vulture wrote, "Of course, the real reason is that (a) no conflict on this show can last longer than 29 minutes, (b) no female love interest on this show can last longer than three episodes, and (c) Anna Faris is ten times cuter and twenty times more interesting than Adrian Grenier and thus had to be jettisoned." Trish Wethman of TV Guide wrote, "Tonight's episode provided several laugh-out-loud moments. This is the Entourage that I always enjoy."

Paul Katz of Entertainment Weekly wrote, "With one more episode left in the season, I expected tonight to be filled with more babes, more drugs, and more obnoxiousness from gonzo director Billy Walsh, a.k.a. Wally Balls. Tonight delivered all that — but the one thing I didn't expect was an episode with social commentary on the state of terrorism today in the United States." Jonathan Toomey of TV Squad wrote, "I've complained here and there about some of the mediocre episodes that have aired this summer. However, it's hard to stay angry when we get one like this. It was perfect really. Hands down, one of the best written episodes of Entourage - spanning all four seasons."

Dan Attias submitted this episode for consideration for Outstanding Directing for a Comedy Series at the 60th Primetime Emmy Awards. He would receive a nomination, but lose to Barry Sonnenfeld for directing the episode "Pie-lette" for Pushing Daisies.
