= Gotta Look Up to Get Down =

- Entourage episode
- Episode no.: Season 5 Episode 7
- Directed by: Mark Mylod
- Written by: Ally Musika; Rob Weiss
- Cinematography by: Colin Watkinson
- Editing by: Dean Holland
- Original release date: October 19, 2008
- Running time: 28 minutes

Guest appearances
- Beverly D'Angelo as Barbara Miller (special guest star); Jeffrey Tambor as Himself (special guest star); Constance Zimmer as Dana Gordon (special guest star); Alan Dale as John Ellis (special guest star); Jason Isaacs as Frederick Lyne (special guest star); Debi Mazar as Shauna Roberts (special guest star); Paul Ben-Victor as Alan Gray; Hayes MacArthur as Levinson; Will Greenberg as Sussman; Kate Albrecht as Christy; Maria Zyrianova as Raina; Daniella van Graas as Natasha; Ella Thomas as Viveca

Episode chronology
← Previous "ReDOMption"	Next → "First Class Jerk"

"Gotta Look Up to Get Down" is the seventh episode of the fifth season of the American comedy-drama television series Entourage. It is the 61st overall episode of the series and was written by producer Ally Musika and executive producer Rob Weiss, and directed by co-executive producer Mark Mylod. It originally aired on HBO on October 19, 2008.

The series chronicles the acting career of Vincent Chase, a young A-list movie star, and his childhood friends from Queens, New York City, as they attempt to further their nascent careers in Los Angeles. In the episode, Vince takes an interest in a model during a photoshoot, while Ari receives an offer from Alan's boss.

According to Nielsen Media Research, the episode was seen by an estimated 1.59 million household viewers and gained a 0.9 ratings share among adults aged 18–49. The episode received mixed reviews from critics, who criticized the pacing, although the final scene between Ari and Vince received praise.

== Plot ==
Acting on an advice by Shauna (Debi Mazar), Vince (Adrian Grenier) agrees to take part on a photoshoot for Dolce & Gabbana. The manager, Frederick "Freddy" Lyne (Jason Isaacs) introduces him to a model named Natasha (Daniella van Graas), whom Vince immediately takes a liking to.

Ari (Jeremy Piven) attends Alan Gray's funeral with Melissa (Perrey Reeves) and the Warner Bros. executives. He attempts to bring up Vince's role in Smoke Jumpers, claiming Alan agreed to let him star before his death. However, Alan's boss, John Ellis (Alan Dale), tells Ari that he is considering assigning the role of studio head to Ari, shocking him. Dana (Constance Zimmer) contacts Ari, asking to be named his right-hand due to her history with the studio. As Ari hesitates on the offer, he starts receiving expensive gifts from Ellis, while also feeling annoyed at his office with many of his clients.

Eric (Kevin Connolly) becomes the new manager for another model named Raina (Maria Zyrianova), who is very aggressive. When Raina replaces Natasha, Vince confronts Freddy over trying to have sex with her. However, it is revealed that Freddy is gay and actually wanted to have sex with Vince, prompting him to pull out of the photoshoot. Ari decides to leave with Melissa on a trip to Geneva to meet with Ellis and his wife, running into the boys at the airport as they plan to leave on a vacation with the models. Ari informs Vince on his offer, and Vince congratulates him, wishing him good luck in his new position as they both leave in their respective planes.

== Production ==
=== Development ===
The episode was written by producer Ally Musika and executive producer Rob Weiss, and directed by co-executive producer Mark Mylod. This was Musika's fifth writing credit, Weiss' 18th writing credit, and Mylod's 13th directing credit.

== Reception ==
=== Viewers ===
In its original American broadcast, "Gotta Look Up to Get Down" was seen by an estimated 1.59 million household viewers with a 0.9 in the 18–49 demographics. This means that 0.9 percent of all households with televisions watched the episode. This was a slight decrease in viewership with the previous episode, which was watched by an estimated 1.61 million household viewers with a 1.0 in the 18–49 demographics.

=== Critical reviews ===
"Gotta Look Up to Get Down" received mixed reviews from critics. Ahsan Haque of IGN gave the episode an "amazing" 9.2 out of 10 and wrote, "Overall, this was another fantastic episode. The final scene with Vince and Ari is a truly great moment for the series and is the key highlight of the episode. With only a half-hour running time, it's amazing how much the writers can squeeze in. There was enough development to make the give significant weight to the conversation that Ari and Vince have at the end of the episode, and the acting was phenomenal, both Adrian Grenier and Jeremy Piven were terrific here."

Josh Modell of The A.V. Club gave the episode a "C+" grade and wrote, "The problem with Entourage expecting us to actually care about the characters this season is that the show hasn't really done anything to earn it. We've spent plenty of time hanging out with the guys (as always), but there hasn't really been a conflict or a solid emotional moment–save perhaps Vince's questioning of Ari about whether he thinks he can act–to hang anything on. We're still watching (some of us, anyway), but it's more for empty fun than out of any real attachment to any of the dudes." Alan Sepinwall wrote, "Other than being amused that Alan Dale now must play every high-powered CEO on television, there wasn't anything worth laughing at, and Ari's job offer mainly seems like yet another excuse for the writers to put Vince into "Smoke Jumpers" - which, for some reason, is the only project of interest to him in all of Hollywood."

Trish Wethman of TV Guide wrote, "My favorite scene came just at the end with Ari opening up to Vince about his offer to take over Alan's job. I was surprised by Vince's tentative reaction and noted to myself that Jeremy Piven and Adrian Grenier did some of the best acting that we've seen on this show. That one short exchange spoke volumes about Vince and Ari's relationship and definitely set the stage for some interesting twists to come." Rob Hunter of Film School Rejects wrote, "Fantastic episode right up until Vince acts like a selfish little shit."

Mark Mylod submitted this episode for consideration for Outstanding Directing for a Comedy Series at the 61st Primetime Emmy Awards.
