= Pie (Entourage) =

- Entourage episode
- Episode no.: Season 5 Episode 9
- Directed by: Mark Mylod
- Written by: Doug Ellin
- Cinematography by: Colin Watkinson
- Editing by: Jeff Groth
- Original release date: November 2, 2008
- Running time: 29 minutes

Guest appearances
- Beverly D'Angelo as Barbara Miller (special guest star); Stellan Skarsgård as Verner Vollstedt (special guest star); Gary Cole as Andrew Klein (special guest star); Jason Patric as Himself (special guest star); Brian Van Holt as Malone

Episode chronology
← Previous "First Class Jerk"	Next → "Seth Green Day"

"Pie" is the ninth episode of the fifth season of the American comedy-drama television series Entourage. It is the 63rd overall episode of the series and was written by series creator Doug Ellin, and directed by co-executive producer Mark Mylod. It originally aired on HBO on November 2, 2008.

The series chronicles the acting career of Vincent Chase, a young A-list movie star, and his childhood friends from Queens, New York City, as they attempt to further their nascent careers in Los Angeles. In the episode, Vince begins filming his project, but feels overshadowed by Jason Patric. Meanwhile, Ari reunites with an old friend, who asks for his help.

According to Nielsen Media Research, the episode was seen by an estimated 1.77 million household viewers and gained a 1.1 ratings share among adults aged 18–49. The episode received generally positive reviews from critics, with praise towards Vince's storyline.

== Plot ==
Filming officially begins on Smoke Jumpers, with Vince (Adrian Grenier) part of the ensemble cast. However, his co-star Jason Patric constantly steals his lines, frustrating him. The director, Verner Vollstedt (Stellan Skarsgård), does not help Vince by being satisfied with the first takes, although he promises that he will make sure it does not overshadow his character's arc.

Ari (Jeremy Piven) meets with Andrew Klein (Gary Cole), an old friend who now works as a TV agent. Andrew has helped Ari through the years, especially convincing him to stay in Hollywood while working as Terrance's assistant. However, Andrew's agency has collapsed due to his boss, and he is asking for a $500,000 loan from Ari. While Ari considers paying him, Lloyd (Rex Lee) informs him that Andrew is lying about his debt. During another meeting, Ari convinces him to sell his agency to Ari and take the position as head of the Miller Gold Agency's TV division. However, Barbara (Beverly D'Angelo) is not thrilled over the news.

The first filming day does not improve, and Patrick continues stealing Vince's line. During a dinner to celebrate the beginning of filming, Patric steals the last piece of pie in front of Turtle (Jerry Ferrara). Having had enough, Vince finally confronts Patric over his lines. Patric states that he didn't steal his lines; Verner himself assigned the lines to him before filming began without telling Vince.

== Production ==
=== Development ===
The episode was written by series creator Doug Ellin, and directed by co-executive producer Mark Mylod. This was Ellin's 40th writing credit, and Mylod's 14th directing credit.

== Reception ==
=== Viewers ===
In its original American broadcast, "Pie" was seen by an estimated 1.77 million household viewers with a 1.1 in the 18–49 demographics. This means that 1.1 percent of all households with televisions watched the episode. This was even in viewership with the previous episode, which was watched by an estimated 1.77 million household viewers with a 1.0 in the 18–49 demographics.

=== Critical reviews ===
"Pie" received generally positive reviews from critics. Ahsan Haque of IGN gave the episode an "amazing" 9.1 out of 10 and wrote, "Overall, this was yet another stellar episode of Entourage. Vince's on-set difficulties seem like some pretty significant challenges for the character, and he's really got to do something quickly if he wants to save his performance in this movie. You almost get the impression that he might have been better off if he chose to do the Benji movie instead."

Josh Modell of The A.V. Club gave the episode a "B" grade and wrote, "Setting everybody back to the beginning may have done a world of good. I'm not saying tonight's episode, "Pie," was on par with the greats, but it got back to some of the things that the show has lost. And it gave Ari and the boys completely separate stories to work in, each with some solid footing." Alan Sepinwall wrote, "I suppose "Pie" was a slight improvement over recent episodes, in that showing Vince at work, in a circumstance where he's no longer top dog has potential to be interesting, and in that they're introducing the wonderful Gary Cole to the cast. But the Cole story didn't amount to much more than set-up for stuff down the road, and Vince is such a flat and passive character that it's hard to get any comedy out of him, even in situations that might have been funny with a different character."

Trish Wethman of TV Guide wrote, "Well, it didn't take very long for the good vibrations to come to a screeching halt. As filming for "Smoke Jumpers" commenced, Vince was introduced to a variety of new and difficult personalities that he will apparently need to contend with during his comeback project." Rob Hunter of Film School Rejects wrote, "I'm still reeling from Ari's decision to pass on the studio job, so I was hoping for an outstanding episode this week to help me begin the laborious process of rebuilding my relationship with the show. Unfortunately, I didn't get one. This week's episode isn't terrible and it isn't great, it just is."
