= Seth Green Day =

- Entourage episode
- Episode no.: Season 5 Episode 10
- Directed by: Ken Whittingham
- Written by: Ally Musika
- Cinematography by: Rob Sweeney
- Editing by: Gregg Featherman
- Original release date: November 9, 2008
- Running time: 29 minutes

Guest appearances
- Beverly D'Angelo as Barbara Miller (special guest star); Emmanuelle Chriqui as Sloan McQuewick (special guest star); Seth Green as Himself (special guest star); Stellan Skarsgård as Verner Vollstedt (special guest star); Gary Cole as Andrew Klein (special guest star); Brian Van Holt as Malone; Bow Wow as Charlie; Janet Varney as Amy Miller; Cassidy Lehrman as Sarah Gold; Christopher Goodman as Assistant Director; James Harvey Ward as Smoke Jumper #1; Mac Brandt as Smoke Jumper #2

Episode chronology
← Previous "Pie"	Next → "Play'n with Fire"

"Seth Green Day" is the tenth episode of the fifth season of the American comedy-drama television series Entourage. It is the 64th overall episode of the series and was written by producer Ally Musika, and directed by Ken Whittingham. It originally aired on HBO on November 9, 2008.

The series chronicles the acting career of Vincent Chase, a young A-list movie star, and his childhood friends from Queens, New York City, as they attempt to further their nascent careers in Los Angeles. In the episode, Eric is forced to meet with his nemesis, Seth Green, to help Charlie with a television pilot. Meanwhile, Ari tries to get Barbara to change her mind and get her to hire Andrew in the agency.

According to Nielsen Media Research, the episode was seen by an estimated 1.83 million household viewers and gained a 1.1 ratings share among adults aged 18–49. The episode received generally positive reviews from critics, although some criticized the pacing.

== Plot ==
Eric (Kevin Connolly) informs Charlie (Bow Wow) that his pilot has been picked up. However, the network informs them that they want Seth Green to be part of the series, alarming Eric as he is still in bad terms with Green after their previous encounter.

Tensions continue arising between Vince (Adrian Grenier) and Verner (Stellan Skarsgård), with both believing the other is to blame. As Barbara (Beverly D'Angelo) is still unconvinced over handing the TV division to Andrew (Gary Cole), Ari (Jeremy Piven) decides to schedule a meeting. He and Lloyd (Rex Lee) help him with a makeover, but he has a panic attack when Barbara insults him. Ari decides to crash an event commemorating Barbara, humiliating her in front of the audience. She is forced to accept Andrew, but warning him that any losses will have to be covered by Ari himself.

Green decides to humiliate Eric by having him call Sloan (Emmanuelle Chriqui) to get the TV offer. Eric visits her, although he does not mention the offer. Green eventually accepts to being part of the pilot, although he continues mocking Eric over Sloan. When Green threatens to get Nick Cannon instead of Charlie, Charlie attacks him and causes the executives to recast their roles.

== Production ==
=== Development ===
The episode was written by producer Ally Musika, and directed by Ken Whittingham. This was Musika's sixth writing credit, and Whittingham's seventh directing credit.

== Reception ==
=== Viewers ===
In its original American broadcast, "Seth Green Day" was seen by an estimated 1.83 million household viewers with a 1.1 in the 18–49 demographics. This means that 1.1 percent of all households with televisions watched the episode. This was a slight increase in viewership with the previous episode, which was watched by an estimated 1.77 million household viewers with a 1.1 in the 18–49 demographics.

=== Critical reviews ===
"Seth Green Day" received positive reviews from critics. Ahsan Haque of IGN gave the episode a "great" 8.5 out of 10 and wrote, "Overall this was yet another highly entertaining episode of Entourage. While it may not be as funny or as memorable as some of the more recent outings, the storyline was advanced nicely and watching Vince face some real challenges throughout the season has been a nice change of pace for the character."

Josh Modell of The A.V. Club gave the episode a "B–" grade and wrote, "Anyway, strangely, we're back to "real life" in Entourage land, which means that Vince is actually a working actor – and having some problems with a Deutsch director named Werner. But guess what? You already knew that, because Vince's problems this week were the same as Vince's problems last week–his lines are being taken away in the service of a film that he's not the star of. At least we got a funny screening-room scene between Stellen Skarsgard and Vince, in which the director tells him that he tilts his head and has a "lip quiver." All ridiculous shit that probably happens in Hollywood every day. It wasn't that compelling here, but slightly interesting/funny at least." Alan Sepinwall wrote, "Well, what do you know? That was almost an entire episode of Entourage that I found entertaining."

Trish Wethman of TV Guide wrote, "After convincing Vince that his onscreen mannerisms were distracting from his performance, Vince's confidence was definitely shaken. If the previews are any indication, things don't look to get better for our hero anytime soon." Rob Hunter of Film School Rejects wrote, "The cocky and confident Vince of seasons' past is long gone it seems, as Verner's comments about a tilted head and a quivering lip freak Vince out. Smokejumpers was built up as Vince's comeback, but I don't see him finishing the movie, let alone gaining any recognition from it."
