= Tree Trippers =

- Entourage episode
- Episode no.: Season 5 Episode 5
- Directed by: Julian Farino
- Written by: Ally Musika
- Cinematography by: Rob Sweeney
- Editing by: Jeff Groth
- Original release date: October 5, 2008
- Running time: 30 minutes

Guest appearances
- Eric Roberts as Himself (special guest star); Paul Ben-Victor as Alan Gray; Brandon Quinn as Tom; Cassidy Lehrman as Sarah Gold; Katie Morgan as Herself; Shay Jordan as Herself; Cassie Young as Herself

Episode chronology
← Previous "Fire Sale"	Next → "ReDOMption"

"Tree Trippers" is the fifth episode of the fifth season of the American comedy-drama television series Entourage. It is the 59th overall episode of the series and was written by producer Ally Musika, and directed by Julian Farino. It originally aired on HBO on October 5, 2008.

The series chronicles the acting career of Vincent Chase, a young A-list movie star, and his childhood friends from Queens, New York City, as they attempt to further their nascent careers in Los Angeles. In the episode, the boys leave for Joshua Tree National Park to help Vince through a big decision, where they decide to use magic mushrooms.

According to Nielsen Media Research, the episode was seen by an estimated 1.53 million household viewers and gained a 0.9 ratings share among adults aged 18–49. The episode received extremely positive reviews from critics, who praised the comedic performances of the cast. For the episode, Kevin Dillon received a nomination for Outstanding Supporting Actor in a Comedy Series, while Julian Farino was nominated for Outstanding Directing for a Comedy Series at the 61st Primetime Emmy Awards.

== Plot ==
Ari (Jeremy Piven) tries to convince Alan Gray (Paul Ben-Victor) about letting Vince (Adrian Grenier) star in Smoke Jumpers, but Gray refuses to allow it after Vince abandoned Aquaman 2. As a back-up plan, Ari suggests Benji, a children's film for $3 million that could help him return to his A-list status. As Vince considers, Drama (Kevin Dillon) decides to get the boys on a trip to Joshua Tree National Park to cleanse his mind off with magic mushrooms.

The boys stop by the house of Eric Roberts, who supplies them with the mushrooms and decides to join them on the trip. He briefly introduces them to Mark Mahoney — a well-known tattoo artist in Hollywood. As Melissa (Perrey Reeves) and the kids are in Santa Barbara, Ari calls Lloyd (Rex Lee), forcing him to cancel his weekend plans with Tom (Brandon Quinn) to watch the house on his behalf. Tom convinces Lloyd in throwing a party at the house with their friends to get back at Ari. At Joshua Tree, the boys start using the mushrooms, although the effects do not immediately take off. As Ari leaves to call Melissa, he finds that she is planning to go back to Los Angeles as Jonah does not like Santa Barbara. Ari bribes him to stay for another day, just as he realizes the effects of the mushrooms are taking effect.

Ari gets lost, while the boys also lose track of Roberts and their dog Arnold, panicking Turtle (Jerry Ferrara). Searching through the desert, Vince starts considering the Benji offer, while Eric (Kevin Connolly) refuses to say a word as he believes he has no mouth. As night falls, Ari and Arnold return with the boys, just as Vince realizes he will have to accept Benji through the signs he saw during the day. When Roberts returns to get them on his RV, Ari is called by Melissa, who decided to return anyway and found Lloyd's party at their house. Passing by a group of firefighters and hallucinating himself as one of them, Vince takes this as a sign to decline Benji and once again pursue Smoke Jumpers.

== Production ==
=== Development ===
The episode was written by producer Ally Musika, and directed by Julian Farino. This was Musika's fourth writing credit, and Farino's 22nd directing credit.

== Reception ==
=== Viewers ===
In its original American broadcast, "Tree Trippers" was seen by an estimated 1.53 million household viewers with a 0.9 in the 18–49 demographics. This means that 0.9 percent of all households with televisions watched the episode. This was a slight decrease in viewership with the previous episode, which was watched by an estimated 1.56 million household viewers with a 1.0 in the 18–49 demographics.

=== Critical reviews ===
"Tree Trippers" received extremely positive reviews from critics. Ahsan Haque of IGN gave the episode an "amazing" 9 out of 10 and wrote, "This episode does very little to advance the overall storyline, other than revealing that Vince prefers doing Smokejumpers. It doesn't have to, as the simple story and brilliant comedy moments more than make up for the lack of progression. It was a fantastic opportunity to see the friends outside of the usually busy LA setting and put on some uncharacteristically over-the-top performances."

Josh Modell of The A.V. Club gave the episode a "B" grade and wrote, "Am I tripping, or was that a pretty damn decent episode of Entourage. There's no doubt in my mind that it was the best of this season, and I'm pretty sure I know why: It wasn't about process, it wasn't really about this season's main storyline exactly, and there was some dumb, totally believable stuff going on. I think it was just last week that I was bemoaning the lack of Busey, and here we got Eric Roberts to take his place on an adventure-filled, funny episode." Kristal Hawkins of Vulture wrote, "When someone who isn't Ari (or Lloyd) gets that focused on homosexuality, we know that the episode promises plenty of warm, wet brotherly love."

Trish Wethman of TV Guide wrote, "All in all, it is great to see these episodes returning to form. I think it has everything to do with moving the focus away from the day-to-day business of movie-making and back to the friendships at the core of the show. I hope they keep it up." Rob Hunter of Film School Rejects wrote, "This week's show ended with Vince wanting Smoke Jumpers but with an offer for Benji. That said, this episode was still one of the funniest of the season so far (almost a complete flip from last week where there were few laughs but there was actual plot movement.)"

Kevin Dillon submitted the episode to support his nomination for Outstanding Supporting Actor in a Comedy Series, while Julian Farino submitted this episode for consideration for Outstanding Directing for a Comedy Series at the 61st Primetime Emmy Awards. Dillon would lose to Jon Cryer for Two and a Half Men, while Farino would lose to Jeffrey Blitz for "Stress Relief" for The Office.
