= Play'n with Fire =

- Entourage episode
- Episode no.: Season 5 Episode 11
- Directed by: Mark Mylod
- Written by: Doug Ellin; Rob Weiss
- Cinematography by: Colin Watkinson
- Editing by: Jeff Groth
- Original release date: November 16, 2008
- Running time: 29 minutes

Guest appearances
- Jamie-Lynn Sigler as Herself (special guest star); Constance Zimmer as Dana Gordon (special guest star); Alan Dale as John Ellis (special guest star); Peter Berg as Himself (special guest star); Stellan Skarsgård as Verner Vollstedt (special guest star); Gary Cole as Andrew Klein (special guest star); Joy Bryant as Herself; Christopher Goodman as Assistant Director

Episode chronology
← Previous "Seth Green Day"	Next → "Return to Queens Blvd."

"Play'n with Fire" is the eleventh episode of the fifth season of the American comedy-drama television series Entourage. It is the 65th overall episode of the series and was written by series creator Doug Ellin and executive producer Rob Weiss, and directed by co-executive producer Mark Mylod. It originally aired on HBO on November 16, 2008.

The series chronicles the acting career of Vincent Chase, a young A-list movie star, and his childhood friends from Queens, New York City, as they attempt to further their nascent careers in Los Angeles. In the episode, the conflict between Vince and Verner hit a breaking point, causing Dana to intervene to save the film. Meanwhile, Turtle spends the day with Jamie-Lynn Sigler.

According to Nielsen Media Research, the episode was seen by an estimated 2.06 million household viewers and gained a 1.3 ratings share among adults aged 18–49. The episode received extremely positive reviews from critics, who praised the characterization of Vince and its consequences.

== Plot ==
Turtle (Jerry Ferrara) is called by Jamie-Lynn Sigler, who invites him to spend the night with her. He sneaks out of the house, not telling Vince (Adrian Grenier) the reason. After a night of sex, Turtle is surprised when Sigler decides to hang out more often with him, with both leaving for a restaurant to dine.

The arguments between Vince and Verner (Stellan Skarsgård) intensify, to the point that Verner demands that Vince makes 50 takes of a scene until he gets it right. Vince eventually confronts him over his actions, and Verner finally reveals that he never wanted Vince for the role. Having had enough, he decides to fire Vince. Eric (Kevin Connolly) informs Ari (Jeremy Piven), who in turn decides to ask Dana (Constance Zimmer) to intervene when Verner does not change his mind. Ari in turn has Lloyd (Rex Lee) for new directors to take over Smoke Jumpers, but scheduling conflicts prevent it.

Vince and Verner refuse to compromise, prompting Dana to angrily demand that Verner return to direct. Instead, Verner decides to confront John Ellis (Alan Dale) at a conference to express his frustrations. While Ellis likes Vince, he believes Dana is not doing a great job leading the studio, and shocks them by choosing to cancel the film. Without anything left in Los Angeles, the boys decide to return to Queens, forcing Turtle to cancel the remainder of his days with Sigler.

== Production ==
=== Development ===
The episode was written by series creator Doug Ellin and executive producer Rob Weiss, and directed by co-executive producer Mark Mylod. This was Ellin's 41st writing credit, Weiss' 20th writing credit, and Mylod's 15th directing credit.

== Reception ==
=== Viewers ===
In its original American broadcast, "Play'n with Fire" was seen by an estimated 2.06 million household viewers with a 1.3 in the 18–49 demographics. This means that 1.3 percent of all households with televisions watched the episode. This was a 12% increase in viewership with the previous episode, which was watched by an estimated 1.83 million household viewers with a 1.1 in the 18–49 demographics.

=== Critical reviews ===
"Play'n with Fire" received extremely positive reviews from critics. Ahsan Haque of IGN gave the episode an "amazing" 9.7 out of 10 and wrote, "Overall this was a fantastic episode consisting of some of the best scenes in the series, and the completely unexpected plot twist with the shut down of Smokejumpers was something nobody would have seen coming. We're really not sure if things will work out in the end for Vince - he hasn't had a break all season, and it's made for some compelling television. Vince needed his lesson in humility, and he's hopefully learned it by now."

Josh Modell of The A.V. Club gave the episode a "B" grade and wrote, "I thought that Vince would be repeatedly marginalized by Werner and that his part would end up on the cutting-room floor (which would've been sorta funny to watch). I think one of you fine folks speculated that Vince would quit. But no! Tonight's episode was entertaining because we were all wrong." Alan Sepinwall wrote, "I think I liked it more as a finale than I do as a penultimate episode, since I suspect all will somehow be made well by the end of next week's show. Still, the Vince/Verner blow-up played out entertainingly, and if the show manages to pull Vince out of his latest mess, at least it gave us a couple of interesting episodes before it did so."

Trish Wethman of TV Guide wrote, "With only one episode left to go, I'm not quite sure how things can get any worse for the boys from Queens. Vince's situation took a dire turn this week as Verner's over-the-top demands pushed Vince to the breaking point. As Vince stood up for himself and demanded some clarity from his mercurial director, Verner unceremoniously fired him on the spot." Rob Hunter of Film School Rejects wrote, "Normally I would take this opportunity to scoff at the unrealistic world of Entourage, but apparently Sigler and Jerry Ferrara are actually dating in real life after meeting on the show. So instead I'll just say it's a nice change to finally see Turtle getting some action and talking about his dreams that don't involve Vince. And to be honest, Sigler is yesterday's news in Hollywood now that she no longer has an eating disorder to keep her weight in check. Meaning her relationship with the squat Turtle may actually be pretty believable after all. But seriously. What the fuck happened to Jason Patric?"

Doug Ellin and Rob Weiss submitted this episode for consideration for Outstanding Writing for a Comedy Series at the 61st Primetime Emmy Awards.
