= Unlike a Virgin (Entourage) =

- Entourage episode
- Episode no.: Season 5 Episode 2
- Directed by: Mark Mylod
- Written by: Doug Ellin
- Cinematography by: Colin Watkinson
- Editing by: Gregg Featherman
- Original release date: September 14, 2008
- Running time: 27 minutes

Guest appearances
- Mark Wahlberg as Himself (special guest star); Giovanni Ribisi as Nick (special guest star); Lukas Haas as L.B. (special guest star); Carla Gugino as Amanda Daniels (special guest star); Tony Bennett as Himself (special guest star); Leighton Meester as Justine Chapin; Julia Levy-Boeken as Jacqueline; Caroline D'Amore as Brooke; Veronica Taylor as Michella

Episode chronology
← Previous "Fantasy Island"	Next → "The All Out Fall Out"

"Unlike a Virgin" is the second episode of the fifth season of the American comedy-drama television series Entourage. It is the 56th overall episode of the series and was written by series creator Doug Ellin, and directed by co-executive producer Mark Mylod. It originally aired on HBO on September 14, 2008.

The series chronicles the acting career of Vincent Chase, a young A-list movie star, and his childhood friends from Queens, New York City, as they attempt to further their nascent careers in Los Angeles. In the episode, Vince tries to resurrect his career, while Drama faces problems in his relationship.

According to Nielsen Media Research, the episode was seen by an estimated 1.65 million household viewers and gained a 1.0/2 ratings share among adults aged 18–49. The episode received positive reviews from critics, who praised Vince's character development.

== Plot ==
Trying to rebuild his career, Vince (Adrian Grenier) starts reading scripts, only to be told that they have already been cast. He takes a liking to a script called Nine Brave Souls, but Ari (Jeremy Piven) rejects going for independent films and suggests that he look for big studio films. Eric (Kevin Connolly) is still determined in finding writers for the project and starts looking for talent.

Drama (Kevin Dillon) is becoming frustrated in his relationship with Jacqueline (Julia Levy-Boeken), feeling that she wants to be very controlling in his life and know all of his moves. When she does not answer her phone for the day, Drama leaves her a message accusing her of cheating on him. However, Jacqueline reveals that she was helping an injured friend and decides to break up with him. At a coffee shop, Vince runs into singer Justine Chapin (Leighton Meester), who invites him to be part of one of his music videos. Vince takes this as a sign that she wants a serious relationship, only to find that she was trying to get him involved with a friend.

Eric offers to represent L.B. (Lukas Haas) and Nick (Giovanni Ribisi), two writers of an indie film script, but can't get them Vince or any help from Ari given their recent bad luck with indie films. Desperate, he visits Amanda (Carla Gugino) and convinces her in reading the script. Vince confronts Justine over her plans, and she admits that if she had sex with him, she'd want a serious relationship. Vince is willing to go with it, and she accepts in trying it. He also tells Ari that he will return to making big studio films, delighting him.

== Production ==
=== Development ===
The episode was written by series creator Doug Ellin, and directed by co-executive producer Mark Mylod. This was Ellin's 36th writing credit, and Mylod's eleventh directing credit.

== Reception ==
=== Viewers ===
In its original American broadcast, "Unlike a Virgin" was seen by an estimated 1.65 million household viewers with a 1.0/2 in the 18–49 demographics. This means that 1 percent of all households with televisions watched the episode, while 2 percent of all of those watching television at the time of the broadcast watched it. This was even in viewership with the previous episode, which was watched by an estimated 2.19 million household viewers with a 1.2/4 in the 18–49 demographics.

=== Critical reviews ===
"Unlike a Virgin" received positive reviews from critics. Ahsan Haque of IGN gave the episode an "amazing" 9.1 out of 10 and wrote, "This was yet another solid outing of Entourage, with an unrelenting pace, some key plot developments, and a few great comedic moments. 'Unlike a Virgin' makes a strong case for why this is one of the best shows on television."

Josh Modell of The A.V. Club wrote, "I think I realized at least part of Entourage's problem tonight, in an episode that actually seemed like it was working to correct it. In getting caught up in all the flash and shit-talking, there was never a sense that characters were being honest with each other. That gets boring, even in a town/scene where nobody's supposed to be honest with each other at any point. Even Ari Gold, who alternates between being too honest and lying through his teeth, rarely seems to have an actual honest, sincere moment anymore. In tonight's halfway-decent episode, he had three." Kristal Hawkins of Vulture wrote, "Drama diligently tries to keep things going with his Cannes-acquired long-distance girlfriend … but when he misses their daily video chat because he's at a party, he tells a lie... and soon exposes his deep insecurities, leaving accusatory messages that elicit this perfectly reasonable response."

Trish Wethman of TV Guide wrote, "In an unexpected twist, Eric, frustrated by Ari's ongoing mistreatment, took their script to Vince’s former agent, Amanda Daniels. Pitting Ari against his female alter ego/nemesis could prove very interesting." Jonathan Toomey of TV Squad wrote, "Ever since the beginning of Entourage, I've been waiting for this episode. As much as I love Vince, it's been a long time coming for his "I'll do whatever the hell I want" mentality to finally come full circle and bite him in the ass." Rob Hunter of Film School Rejects wrote, "Overall, an average episode. The laughs, limited as they were, all came from Piven's ranting and raving Ari. The lady flesh was non-existent. And the believability meter scored remarkably low due to the gun-toting screenwriter duo and the scene where a hot chick actually leaves a party with Turtle implying that they’ll be having sex."
