= ReDOMption =

- Entourage episode
- Episode no.: Season 5 Episode 6
- Directed by: Seith Mann
- Written by: Doug Ellin
- Cinematography by: Rob Sweeney
- Editing by: Dean Holland
- Original release date: October 12, 2008
- Running time: 30 minutes

Guest appearances
- Phil Mickelson as Himself (special guest star); Martin Landau as Bob Ryan (special guest star); Paul Ben-Victor as Alan Gray; Domenick Lombardozzi as Dom; Bow Wow as Charlie; Michael Monks as Director; Janet Varney as Amy Miller; Martha Millan as Sylvi; Branden Williams as Himself; Jimmy Shubert as Jail Guard

Episode chronology
← Previous "Tree Trippers"	Next → "Gotta Look Up to Get Down"

"ReDOMption" is the sixth episode of the fifth season of the American comedy-drama television series Entourage. It is the 60th overall episode of the series and was written by series creator Doug Ellin, and directed by Seith Mann. It originally aired on HBO on October 12, 2008.

The series chronicles the acting career of Vincent Chase, a young A-list movie star, and his childhood friends from Queens, New York City, as they attempt to further their nascent careers in Los Angeles. In the episode, Dom returns and asks for Vince's help, but Eric distrusts him. Meanwhile, Turtle starts working as Drama's personal assistant, while Ari plays golf with Alan Gray to get a big role for Vince.

According to Nielsen Media Research, the episode was seen by an estimated 1.61 million household viewers and gained a 1.0 ratings share among adults aged 18–49. The episode received mixed reviews from critics, who criticized the disjointed the storylines, particularly Dom's subplot.

== Plot ==
Hoping to get Vince (Adrian Grenier) in Smoke Jumpers, Ari (Jeremy Piven) decides to visit Alan Gray (Paul Ben-Victor) at a golf course to bet on the role. Ari is confident that Alan's poor skills will be enough to win the bet, until he finds that Alan's coach is Phil Mickelson, and that Alan invited Bob Ryan (Martin Landau) to insult Ari's performance during the game.

Vince is called by Dom (Domenick Lombardozzi), who is on a car chase with LAPD officers on live TV. Dom is arrested and placed on jail, and he asks Vince to bail him out. Vince makes Eric (Kevin Connolly) pay the $100,000 bail, frustrating him. Believing that Dom is lying over his family and attempts at becoming a better person, Eric decides to watch over him through the day. He gets him to accompany them to a meeting where his client Charlie (Bow Wow) manages to land a pilot. Meanwhile, Turtle (Jerry Ferrara) desperately needs money, so he agrees to work as a personal assistant to Drama (Kevin Dillon). However, Drama's complicated demands prove to be difficult for Turtle, who decides to get him an extra willing to have sex with him to make up for it, but Drama refuses. Eventually, Turtle decides to just quit.

Ari loses the game, even when Alan gives him an easy final chance to score. Alan then begins insulting Ari for ruining his day by mentioning Vince, until he suddenly collapses from a heart attack. Vince and Eric visit Dom's house, meeting his wife and child, both unaware of his arrest. They tell Dom to be honest with them, believing his wife will forgive him. Instead, his wife abandons him and Dom asks to go back to prison, feeling he has nothing left. At the apartment, the boys are called by Ari, who informs them that Alan died from the heart attack.

== Production ==
=== Development ===
The episode was written by series creator Doug Ellin, and directed by Seith Mann. This was Ellin's 38th writing credit, and Mann's third directing credit.

== Reception ==
=== Viewers ===
In its original American broadcast, "ReDOMption" was seen by an estimated 1.61 million household viewers with a 1.0 in the 18–49 demographics. This means that 1 percent of all households with televisions watched the episode. This was a slight increase in viewership with the previous episode, which was watched by an estimated 1.53 million household viewers with a 0.9 in the 18–49 demographics.

=== Critical reviews ===
"ReDOMption" received mixed reviews from critics. Ahsan Haque of IGN gave the episode a "good" 7.5 out of 10 and wrote, "Overall, this was a very decent episode, and it served the purpose of slightly advancing the overall storyline, but on its own, it doesn't stand up so well. It felt like a series of separate stories randomly put together, all of which were neither overly funny, nor were they memorably dramatic. One of the main problems was Dom, who despite all of his sorrows and bad luck, is a character that's too hard to like. Even with his losses at the end of the episode, it's hard to feel any sympathy for him. The twist with Alan Gray was well played however, but it happened at the very end of the episode, so by the time the implications of his death started to settle in, the show was over."

Genevieve Koski of The A.V. Club gave the episode a "B–" grade and wrote, "While a lot of the show's comedic premise has gotten pretty tired–Ari is angry, Drama is dumb, Turtle is high–plot-wise, I think the show is more interesting than it's been since the days of Aquaman."

Alan Sepinwall wrote, "I actually have very little to say about tonight's Entourage, save that the ending of Ari's story feels like it's going to be a particularly skeevy way for the show to travel its usual "everything works out just fine for Vince" route." Kristal Hawkins of Vulture wrote, "A sobered Ari calls the boys to let them know what happened and announces he's going home to his family because life is short. Next week, we assume — and will only assume, not actually try to find out — everything will return to normal."

Trish Wethman of TV Guide wrote, "The end of the episode took a bittersweet turn as the guys learned about Alan's death and a shaken Ari realized the fragility of life. He even gave the usual insults a rest, telling Eric to "Be well," A kinder, gentler Ari? It'll never last." Rob Hunter of Film School Rejects wrote, "If last week's episode was the best of the season so far, which it was, then this week's is the worst."

Seith Mann submitted this episode for consideration for Outstanding Directing for a Comedy Series at the 61st Primetime Emmy Awards.
