= First Class Jerk =

- Entourage episode
- Episode no.: Season 5 Episode 8
- Directed by: Ken Whittingham
- Written by: Doug Ellin; Rob Weiss
- Cinematography by: Todd A. Dos Reis
- Editing by: Jeff Groth
- Original release date: October 26, 2008
- Running time: 24 minutes

Guest appearances
- Beverly D'Angelo as Barbara Miller (special guest star); Jamie-Lynn Sigler as Herself (special guest star); Constance Zimmer as Dana Gordon (special guest star); Alan Dale as John Ellis (special guest star); Frank Darabont as Himself (special guest star); Carla Gugino as Amanda Daniels (special guest star); Joshua LeBar as Josh Weinstein

Episode chronology
← Previous "Gotta Look Up to Get Down"	Next → "Pie"

"First Class Jerk" is the eighth episode of the fifth season of the American comedy-drama television series Entourage. It is the 62nd overall episode of the series and was written by series creator Doug Ellin and executive producer Rob Weiss, and directed by Ken Whittingham. It originally aired on HBO on October 26, 2008.

The series chronicles the acting career of Vincent Chase, a young A-list movie star, and his childhood friends from Queens, New York City, as they attempt to further their nascent careers in Los Angeles. In the episode, Ari is pressured in accepting the offer to become the studio head of Warner Bros., while Turtle tries to convince his friends that he had a sexual encounter with Jamie-Lynn Sigler.

According to Nielsen Media Research, the episode was seen by an estimated 1.77 million household viewers and gained a 1.0 ratings share among adults aged 18–49. The episode received generally positive reviews from critics, although some expressed frustration with the closure to Ari's storyline.

== Plot ==
The boys return to Los Angeles from vacations in Hawaii. Due to an issue, three tickets are in coach class, while one is for first class. After debating on who should go to first class, their cab driver chooses Turtle (Jerry Ferrara). During the flight, Turtle changes seats to sit next to Jamie-Lynn Sigler. She is on bad terms due to a recent break-up, so Turtle decides to steal some vodka to cheer her up. Upon landing, Turtle tells the boys that she masturbated him but they do not believe his story.

Ellis offers $10 million to Ari (Jeremy Piven) for becoming the new studio head of Warner Bros., frustrating his employees at the agency when the news leak in Variety. After talking with Melissa (Perrey Reeves) over the advantages and disadvantages, Ari prepares to announce his withdrawal from the offer. However, he is informed by Dana (Constance Zimmer) that Amanda (Carla Gugino) is the next one in consideration for the job. He visits her to apologize for his past actions and to get her in not firing his staff, but Amanda is not interested.

Vince (Adrian Grenier) and Eric (Kevin Connolly) meet with Josh Weinstein (Joshua LeBar), who is interested in getting Vince as a client. Weinstein brings Frank Darabont to offer them a project, but they choose to decline when Darabont only offers a TV show. Vince and Eric are then called to Ari's office, who reveals that he turned down the offer but he strongly recommended Dana instead, and she was named the next studio head. As part of this, Dana has greenlit Smoke Jumpers with Vince on a co-lead role. During a celebration, Sigler slaps Turtle for telling his friends about their encounter. Drama (Kevin Dillon) tells Sigler that he was the one who spread the rumor and advocates for Turtle. Nevertheless, Sigler is angry at Turtle, revealing that the event happened and that she would've had sex with him if he never told anyone.

== Production ==
=== Development ===
The episode was written by series creator Doug Ellin and executive producer Rob Weiss, and directed by Ken Whittingham. This was Ellin's 39th writing credit, Weiss' 19th writing credit, and Whittingham's sixth directing credit.

== Reception ==
=== Viewers ===
In its original American broadcast, "First Class Jerk" was seen by an estimated 1.77 million household viewers with a 1.0 in the 18–49 demographics. This means that 1 percent of all households with televisions watched the episode. This was a 9% increase in viewership with the previous episode, which was watched by an estimated 1.61 million household viewers with a 1.0 in the 18–49 demographics.

=== Critical reviews ===
"First Class Jerk" received generally positive reviews from critics. Ahsan Haque of IGN gave the episode an "amazing" 9 out of 10 and wrote, "With everything seemingly back in order by the end of the episode, some viewers might complain that nothing happened in the end with the Ari as studio exec story arc. It's the journey that matters in the end. We had a chance to see what Ari's real values are, and even though we all know he's actually got some integrity underneath all the slick agent exterior, it's nice to actually see it surface from time to time. Overall this was another memorable episode. Ari's final decision wasn't an easy one, and the process of going through all the scenarios was nicely handled."

Josh Modell of The A.V. Club gave the episode a "B" grade and wrote, "I expected last week's big cliffhanger to play itself out over a few weeks, not just half an hour–and I have to say I'm a little disappointed that everything wrapped up so neatly on this week's Entourage, because after the will-he-or-won't-he end to last week, I actually found myself interested in what would happen next. But this week's episode wrapped everything up with a neat little bow, which was even acknowledged right there in the script. Everybody was back to where they started: Vince was a movie star, Ari was an agent, and Turtle was "pussy-less."" Alan Sepinwall wrote, "A lot of things that could have been interesting have happened over the last few episodes, but they've all been executed in the same lazy, status quo-protecting fashion that keeps the Entourage engine running somehow."

Trish Wethman of TV Guide named it a "hysterically funny and well-crafted episode." Rob Hunter of Film School Rejects wrote, "Believability issues aside, this leaves the viewers stuck with the status qou yet again. All of the characters still in the same damn position they've been in for some time now. Ari as a studio head would have opened up so many new and dramatic avenues and story-lines, but instead we get the same old shtick."
