= The All Out Fall Out =

- Entourage episode
- Episode no.: Season 5 Episode 3
- Directed by: Mark Mylod
- Written by: Rob Weiss
- Cinematography by: Colin Watkinson
- Editing by: Gregg Featherman
- Original release date: September 21, 2008
- Running time: 28 minutes

Guest appearances
- Fran Drescher as Mrs. Levine (special guest star); Kevin Pollak as Mr. Levine (special guest star); T.I. as Himself (special guest star); Jason Geter as T.I.'s friend; Carla Gugino as Amanda Daniels (special guest star); Debi Mazar as Shauna Roberts (special guest star); Jordan Belfi as Adam Davies; Paul Herman as Marvin; Kate Albrecht as Christy; Cassidy Lehrman as Sarah Gold; Ashley Rickards as Candice Levine; Troy Gentile as Mitchell Levine

Episode chronology
← Previous "Unlike a Virgin"	Next → "Fire Sale"

"The All Out Fall Out" is the third episode of the fifth season of the American comedy-drama television series Entourage. It is the 57th overall episode of the series and was written by executive producer Rob Weiss, and directed by co-executive producer Mark Mylod. It originally aired on HBO on September 21, 2008.

The series chronicles the acting career of Vincent Chase, a young A-list movie star, and his childhood friends from Queens, New York City, as they attempt to further their nascent careers in Los Angeles. In the episode, Vince gets a gig at a birthday party, much to his chagrin. Meanwhile, Ari gets into a prank war with Adam Davies.

According to Nielsen Media Research, the episode was seen by an estimated 1.58 million household viewers and gained a 1.0/2 ratings share among adults aged 18–49. The episode received extremely positive reviews from critics, with particular praise towards Ari's storyline.

== Plot ==
Vince (Adrian Grenier) is informed by his accountant that his savings are running low and that he needs to get a job at any cost. He asks Shauna (Debi Mazar) for help, and she convinces him in taking part in a rich girl's birthday party. However, Vince is insulted by the treatment of the parents (Fran Drescher and Kevin Pollak), and decides to leave with the boys.

For his birthday, Ari (Jeremy Piven) receives a Ferrari. As he drives, he has an encounter with Davies (Jordan Belfi) and they bet $100 on a race to their offices, but Ari loses the race. Later, Davies sends two male strippers disguised as police officers to dance around Ari at his office, ruining a meeting with a client. Ari decides to get back at him by sending an explicit photo of his ex-girlfriend, but Davies is not only unbothered, but also sends a nude picture of Melissa (Perrey Reeves) from a lost film. Reaching his limit, Ari angrily goes to Davies' office to demand an apology. He initially refuses until Ari slaps him in front of his colleagues, humiliating him and finally apologizing.

Eric (Kevin Connolly) is told by Amanda (Carla Gugino) that Edward Norton received the script for Nine Brave Souls and he agreed to star in it if he can retool it. Vince is forced by Shauna and his accountant in returning to the party, with the promise of $200,000 just for singing "Can't Take My Eyes Off You". He starts singing, only to be joined by a drunk Drama (Kevin Dillon), after the latter drinks a bottle of Johnnie Walker Blue whisky. Their performance is well received, although the party is ruined when Drama vomits over the birthday cake.

== Production ==
=== Development ===
The episode was written by executive producer Rob Weiss, and directed by co-executive producer Mark Mylod. This was Weiss' 17th writing credit, and Mylod's twelfth directing credit.

== Reception ==
=== Viewers ===
In its original American broadcast, "The All Out Fall Out" was seen by an estimated 1.58 million household viewers with a 1.0/2 in the 18–49 demographics. This means that 1 percent of all households with televisions watched the episode, while 2 percent of all of those watching television at the time of the broadcast watched it. This was a slight decrease in viewership with the previous episode, which was watched by an estimated 1.65 million household viewers with a 1.0/2 in the 18–49 demographics.

=== Critical reviews ===
"The All Out Fall Out" received extremely positive reviews from critics. Ahsan Haque of IGN gave the episode an "amazing" 9.5 out of 10 and wrote, "Ari's moments with Adam alone make this episode the best of this new season, but the further developments with the script and the birthday party scenes further cement this as yet another example of why Entourage is one of the best shows on television."

Josh Modell of The A.V. Club gave the episode a "B–" grade and wrote, "How much can we ask from a show like Entourage at this point? It gave us a couple of really funny years, and now it's coasting a bit–mostly, it seems, because of a lack of any really grabby storylines. There's no romance this season (yet) and Vince's lack of a job is just starting to heat up. They're setting some things up, clearly, but it's taking a while to arc, as they say in Hollywood."

Alan Sepinwall wrote, "Much more than the previous two episodes, this one gave me some faint hope that Entourage might be at least decent again." Kristal Hawkins of Vulture wrote, "Vince's star power continues to dim, but Eric starts to shine; Ari enjoys a glorious meltdown, and Drama goes out in flames. Just as we drift away, Entourage pulls. us. back. in."

Trish Wethman of TV Guide wrote, "The easily-bruised egos of the various men of Entourage were the center piece of tonight's episode and it made for some amusing moments. While I'm still patiently waiting for return of the laugh-out-loud lines of the early seasons, it does seem like we have finally moved past "Medellin." For that, I am grateful." Rob Hunter of Film School Rejects wrote, "Overall another average episode. Less drama and character work this week than last, but there is a strong setup for an upcoming clash."
