= Fire Sale (Entourage) =

- Entourage episode
- Episode no.: Season 5 Episode 4
- Directed by: Seith Mann
- Written by: Doug Ellin
- Cinematography by: Rob Sweeney
- Editing by: Dean Holland; Bill Johnson
- Original release date: September 28, 2008
- Running time: 24 minutes

Guest appearances
- Giovanni Ribisi as Nick (special guest star); Lukas Haas as L.B. (special guest star); Tim Matheson as Steve Parles (special guest star); Whoopi Goldberg as Herself (special guest star); Elisabeth Hasselbeck as Herself (special guest star); Sherri Shepherd as Herself (special guest star); Carla Gugino as Amanda Daniels (special guest star); Debi Mazar as Shauna Roberts (special guest star); Branden Williams as Himself; Daniel Samonas as Tommy; Cole Williams as Himself; Tom Rothman as Himself

Episode chronology
← Previous "The All Out Fall Out"	Next → "Tree Trippers"

"Fire Sale" is the fourth episode of the fifth season of the American comedy-drama television series Entourage. It is the 58th overall episode of the series and was written by series creator Doug Ellin, and directed by Seith Mann. It originally aired on HBO on September 28, 2008.

The series chronicles the acting career of Vincent Chase, a young A-list movie star, and his childhood friends from Queens, New York City, as they attempt to further their nascent careers in Los Angeles. In the episode, Eric gets into a bidding war for Vince's new project, while Drama humiliates himself on live television.

According to Nielsen Media Research, the episode was seen by an estimated 1.56 million household viewers and gained a 1.0 ratings share among adults aged 18–49. The episode received generally positive reviews from critics, although there was criticism towards the pacing of the storylines.

== Plot ==
Development continues on Nine Brave Souls, now re-titled Smoke Jumpers. While Ari (Jeremy Piven) likes the script, he wants it turned into a big studio film that will star Vince (Adrian Grenier). Eric (Kevin Connolly) tells L.B. (Lukas Haas) and Nick (Giovanni Ribisi) about the bidding war on the script, but they tell him they will increase the bid to $500,000 and guarantee that the film will be made.

Determined to postpone his post-breakup depression, Drama (Kevin Dillon) appears on The View to promote Five Towns with his other cast members. However, he is overcome with jealousy over his castmates' girlfriends and breaks down in television, humiliating himself. As Shauna (Debi Mazar) and Turtle (Jerry Ferrara) try to calm him, he decides to strip naked from his limousine, throwing his pants at a passing police officer. This causes him to get arrested, and forcing the boys to bail him out.

Eric meets with Amanda (Carla Gugino), who is still determined in winning the script. When she can't meet the criteria for the writers' petitions, Eric is forced to leave her without the script. Ari also faces challenges in finding an investor, as Vince's reputation has dampened after the failure of Medellín. Vince decides to sell it to a producer who provides the needed $500,000, but chooses to play a less important role in the film. Eric informs L.B. and Nick over the news, who reluctantly accept the deal despite having expressed enthusiasm for having Norton as co-star. After picking Drama from prison, Vince announces that Drama will co-star in the film, as his guest appearance in The View actually boosted his image. However, Amanda calls to inform that Alan Gray is offering $2,000,000 to buy the script and have Norton as co-star.

== Production ==
=== Development ===
The episode was written by series creator Doug Ellin, and directed by Seith Mann. This was Ellin's 37th writing credit, and Mann's second directing credit.

== Reception ==
=== Viewers ===
In its original American broadcast, "Fire Sale" was seen by an estimated 1.56 million household viewers with a 1.0 in the 18–49 demographics. This means that 1 percent of all households with televisions watched the episode. This was a slight decrease in viewership with the previous episode, which was watched by an estimated 1.58 million household viewers with a 1.0/2 in the 18–49 demographics.

=== Critical reviews ===
"Fire Sale" received generally positive reviews from critics. Ahsan Haque of IGN gave the episode a "good" 7.8 out of 10 and wrote, "The entire bidding war process made for some highly entertaining dramatic moments, but also meant that there were fewer comedic scenes in this episode. Drama messing up and getting arrested didn't provide enough comic relief either, as the entire process felt a little too tedious and familiar. The ending scene with Vince coming to bail out Drama from jail and telling his brother about his potential role was touching, and the subsequent phone call from Amanda was a great way to end the episode, but overall, this wasn't as memorable an installment as last week's superb Ari-centric episode."

Josh Modell of The A.V. Club gave the episode a "B–" grade and wrote, "It wasn't a great episode, but the teaser for next week's actually looks sorta promising, with the guys heading out to the desert to make some tough choices. Namely whether Vince should take the role in Benji. Ari promises Miss Alaska in his trailer waiting to blow him after every take, so maybe he'll go for it." Kristal Hawkins of Vulture wrote, "Drama lets his co-stars goad him into tearfully venting his sob story to Whoopi and Elisabeth on The View, but when he drunkenly strips down, throws his pants out of a limo window, and gets arrested, it's nowhere near as fun to watch as you'd think that would be."

Trish Wethman of TV Guide wrote, "I’m not sure if it was the bidding war over the newly-titled “Smoke Jumpers,” Drama's emotional meltdown on The View or the whiff of desperation that seems to be surrounding Vince these days, but tonight's episode had a renewed energy and some of those laugh-out-loud lines that I've been waiting for all season. This is what I call progress." Rob Hunter of Film School Rejects wrote, "I may be alone in this view, but this was easily the best episode of the new season so far. The depth of Vince's situation is becoming more than just a surface reality."
