= Fantasy Island (Entourage) =

- Entourage episode
- Episode no.: Season 5 Episode 1
- Directed by: Mark Mylod
- Written by: Doug Ellin
- Cinematography by: Rob Sweeney; Colin Watkinson
- Editing by: Gregg Featherman
- Original release date: September 7, 2008
- Running time: 27 minutes

Guest appearances
- Richard Roeper as Himself (special guest star); Michael Phillips as Himself (special guest star); Jordan Belfi as Adam Davies; Kim Coates as Carl Ertz; Bow Wow as Charlie; Julia Levy-Boeken as Jacqueline; Beverly Sanders as Eric's Receptionist; Stephanie Vogt as Liz; Branden Williams as Himself; Ryan Eggold as Himself; Cole Williams as Himself; Daniel Samonas as Tommy; Felisha Terrell as Carol; Rachel Sterling as Ana; Nico Elicerio as Turtle's Girl

Episode chronology
← Previous "The Cannes Kids"	Next → "Unlike a Virgin"

"Fantasy Island" is the first episode of the fifth season of the American comedy-drama television series Entourage. It is the 55th overall episode of the series and was written by series creator Doug Ellin, and directed by co-executive producer Mark Mylod. It originally aired on HBO on September 7, 2008.

The series chronicles the acting career of Vincent Chase, a young A-list movie star, and his childhood friends from Queens, New York City, as they attempt to further their nascent careers in Los Angeles. In the episode, Vince and Turtle stay in Mexico following the poor reception of Medellín, while Ari gets a new offer for Vince.

According to Nielsen Media Research, the episode was seen by an estimated 1.65 million household viewers and gained a 1.0/2 ratings share among adults aged 18–49. The episode received positive reviews from critics, who praised the new focus on Vince.

== Plot ==
After the premiere at Cannes, Medellín is sent straight-to-DVD and slammed by critics like Richard Roeper and Michael Phillips, with both putting it among their "worst movies of the year" lists. Six months later and after not getting any more film offers, Vince (Adrian Grenier) has left for Mexico to stay at a resort with Turtle (Jerry Ferrara).

Drama (Kevin Dillon) is still in a relationship with Jacqueline (Julia Levy-Boeken), through long-distance as she stays in France. He gets into an argument with a director during a photoshoot for the Five Towns poster. Ari (Jeremy Piven) is contacted by producer Carl Ertz (Kim Coates), who says he wants Vince for his new film, Danger Beach. He gets Eric (Kevin Connolly) and Drama to accompany him to Mexico and get Vince back.

In Mexico, Vince initially rejects the boys' offer to return, but is eventually convinced by the new role. Arriving in Los Angeles, he meets up with Carl, but discovers that he never planned to have him star in the film; he only wanted to suggest he was hiring him to lock Emile Hirsch in the lead role. That night, Drama and Turtle drive to Carl's house and smash one of his cars in revenge.

== Production ==
=== Development ===
The episode was written by series creator Doug Ellin, and directed by co-executive producer Mark Mylod. This was Ellin's 35th writing credit, and Mylod's tenth directing credit.

== Reception ==
=== Viewers ===
In its original American broadcast, "Fantasy Island" was seen by an estimated 1.65 million household viewers with a 1.0/2 in the 18–49 demographics. This means that 1 percent of all households with televisions watched the episode, while 2 percent of all of those watching television at the time of the broadcast watched it. This was a 25% decrease in viewership from the previous episode, which was watched by an estimated 2.19 million household viewers with a 1.2/4 in the 18–49 demographics.

=== Critical reviews ===
"Fantasy Island" received positive reviews from critics. Ahsan Haque of IGN gave the episode an "amazing" 9 out of 10 and wrote, "Featuring a fantastic soundtrack and great pacing, this episode does a great job in setting the tone for the latest season of Entourage. While it's not as impressive as last season's phenomenal opener, "Fantasy Land" provides viewers with more than enough character moments to keep fans glued to the screen from start to finish."

Josh Modell of The A.V. Club gave the episode a "B–" grade and wrote, "general consensus in the outside world was that Entourage was turning into a similar pile of overblown nothingness, with the same characters running through the same routines. I actually don't think the drop has been that precipitous; then again, I never thought the show was particularly amazing. I still think it's funny and worth watching, and I'd like to think/hope that it's fairly true to the fairytale world of Hollywood." Alan Sepinwall of The Star-Ledger wrote, "When last season ended with Vince's dream project "Medellin" getting booed at its Cannes premiere, I assumed that the show would return with Vince laughing off his latest career hiccup while he and Turtle partied with some new anonymous hotties. That is, in fact, how season five begins, but it quickly becomes clear that, for once on Entourage, success isn't coming that easily for Vince."

Trish Wethman of TV Guide wrote, "It was great to see Ari back in action, spouting his usual venom and brow-beating poor Lloyd and anyone else within a 12-inch radius. I also enjoyed Johnny’s internet chats with Jacqueline, complete with bird noises, and his assertion to the cast photographer that he “doesn’t go right.” Kevin Dillon continues to be one of the best things about this show. His Johnny Chase is such a unique mix of bluster and vulnerability and he nails it every time." Jonathan Toomey of TV Squad wrote, "Considering how last season ended and what we've come to expect from Entourage, this felt less like a season premiere and more like just another episode. Vincent Chase can only stay down and out hidden in Mexico for so long before the allure of his almost dead career came calling."
