= 60th Primetime Emmy Awards =

2008 American television programming awards

- Promotional poster
- Date: September 21, 2008 (Ceremony); September 13, 2008 (Creative Arts Awards)
- Location: Nokia Theatre, Los Angeles, California
- Presented by: Academy of Television Arts and Sciences
- Hosted by: Tom Bergeron; Heidi Klum; Howie Mandel; Jeff Probst; Ryan Seacrest

Highlights
- Most awards: Major: John Adams (5); All: John Adams (13)
- Most nominations: John Adams; Recount (8)
- Outstanding Comedy Series: 30 Rock
- Outstanding Drama Series: Mad Men
- Outstanding Miniseries: John Adams
- Outstanding Reality-Competition Program: The Amazing Race
- Outstanding Variety, Music or Comedy Series: The Daily Show with Jon Stewart
- Website: http://www.emmys.com/

Television/radio coverage
- Network: ABC
- Produced by: Ken Ehrlich
- Directed by: Louis J. Horvitz

The 60th Primetime Emmy Awards were held on Sunday, September 21, 2008, at the newly opened Nokia Theatre in Los Angeles, California to honor the best in U.S. prime time television. The ceremony was hosted by Tom Bergeron (who was also hosting America's Funniest Home Videos and Dancing with the Stars, both also on ABC, at the time), Heidi Klum, Howie Mandel, Jeff Probst, and Ryan Seacrest (all were nominated in the debut category—Outstanding Host for a Reality or Reality-Competition Program) and televised in the United States on ABC. 28 awards were presented.

The nominations were announced on July 17 by Kristin Chenoweth and Neil Patrick Harris. The Creative Arts Emmy Awards were held eight days earlier (September 13) at the same venue. The ceremony was hosted by Neil Patrick Harris and Sarah Chalke.

The telecast was viewed by 12.20 million with a household rating of 8.86/12.79 making it the lowest rated and least viewed ceremony in its televised history. Many critics cited lackluster performances from the five hosts as a reason for the huge decline. Others pointed to the field of nominees which were dominated by low-rated and sparsely viewed programs, thus making the Emmys widely considered as a bust, which was panned by critics as "... the worst ever, laid a big, fat ratings egg as well ..."

In 2011, when TV Guide Network re-did their list of "25 Biggest TV Blunders", this ceremony was included.

For the first time in a decade, the Primetime Emmy Award for Outstanding Comedy Series was won by the defending champion. 30 Rock

Outstanding Drama Series went to AMC freshmen series Mad Men. This marked the first series award for a program on a basic cable station. Mad Men led all dramas with six major nominations.

This would be the final ceremony to have five nominees per category, most major categories (acting and programs) were expanded to include at least six slots the following year.

== Winners and nominees ==
Winners are listed first and highlighted in bold:

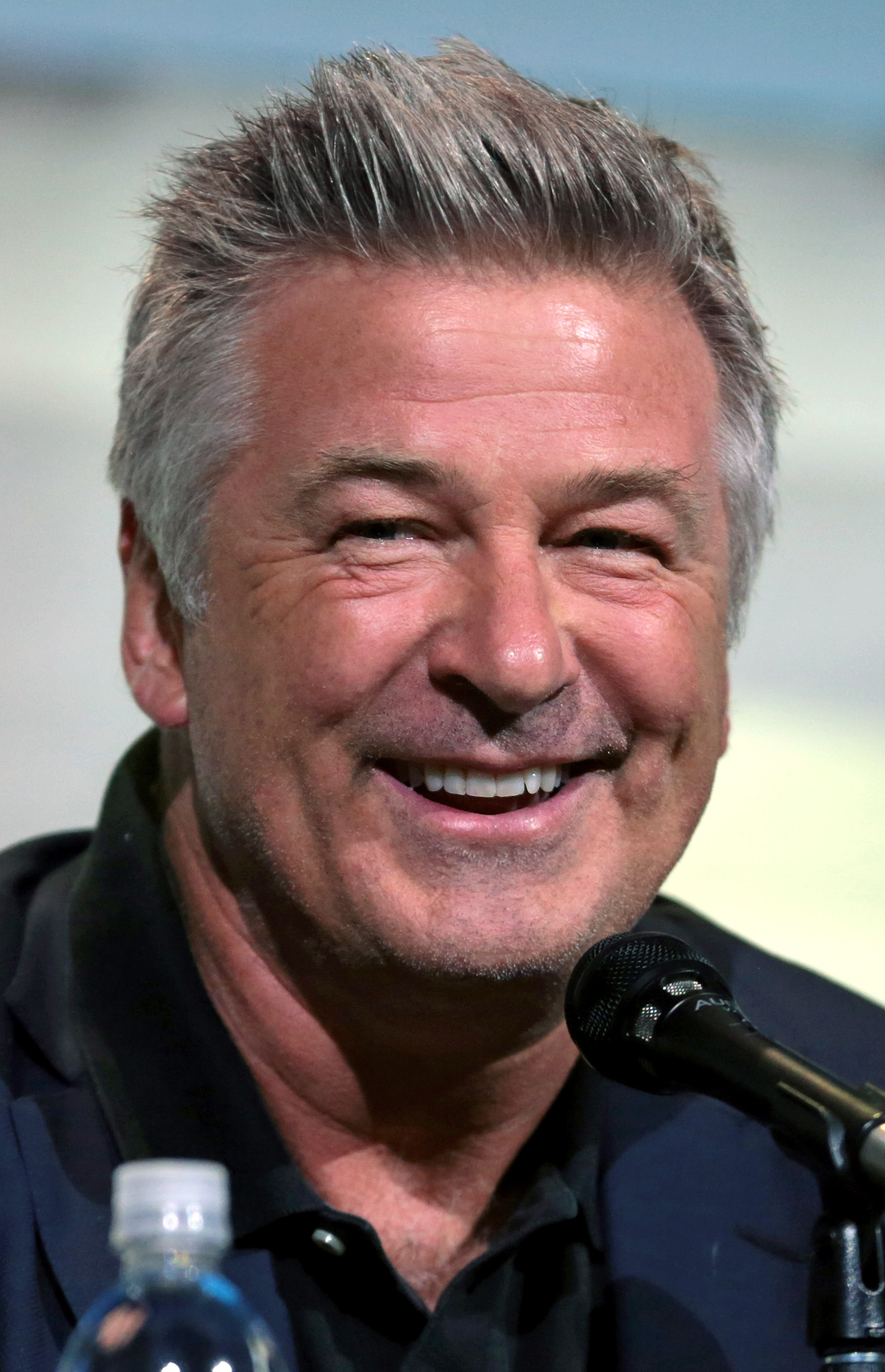
Alec Baldwin, Outstanding Lead Actor in a Comedy Series winner

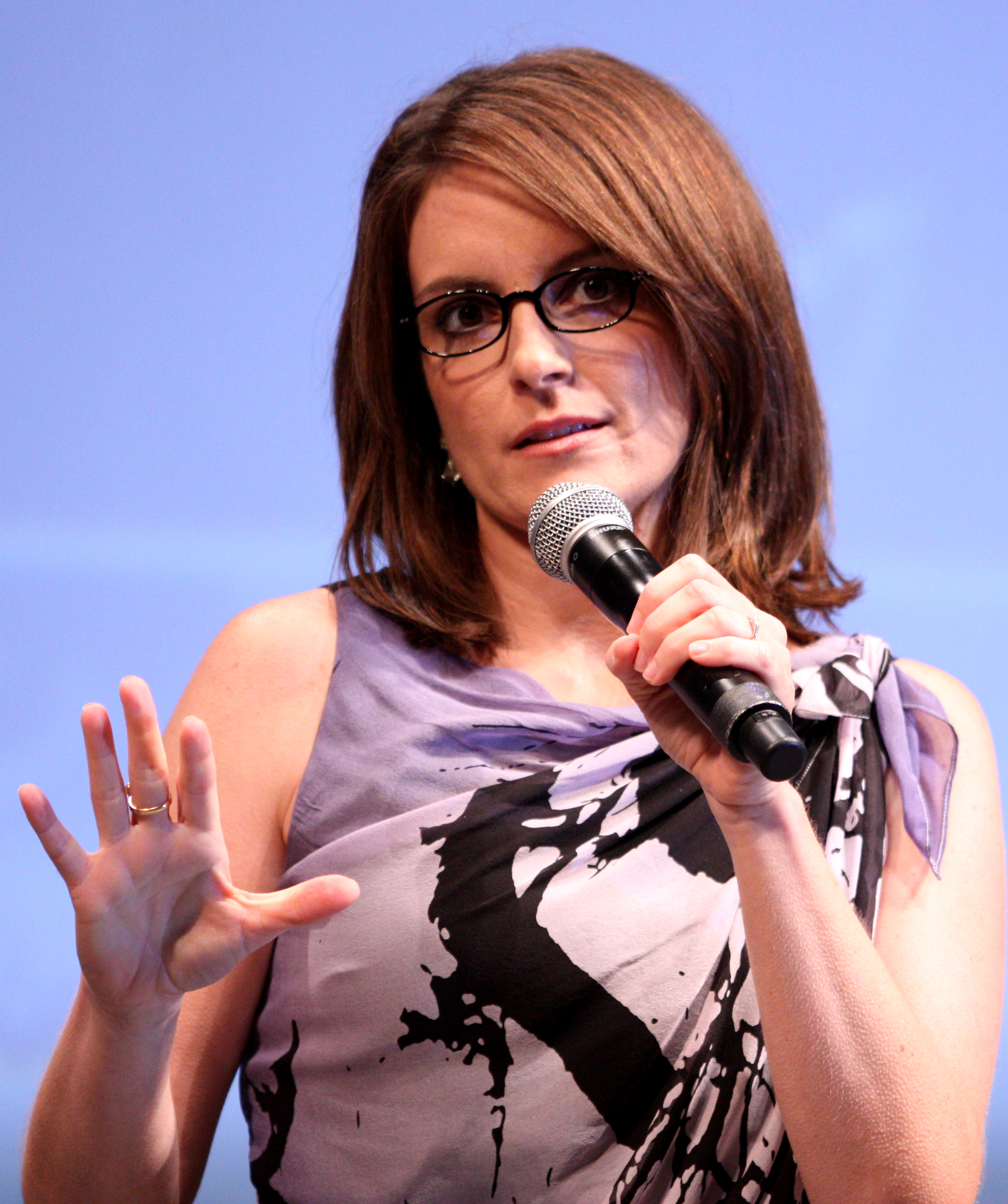
Tina Fey, Outstanding Lead Actress in a Comedy Series winner

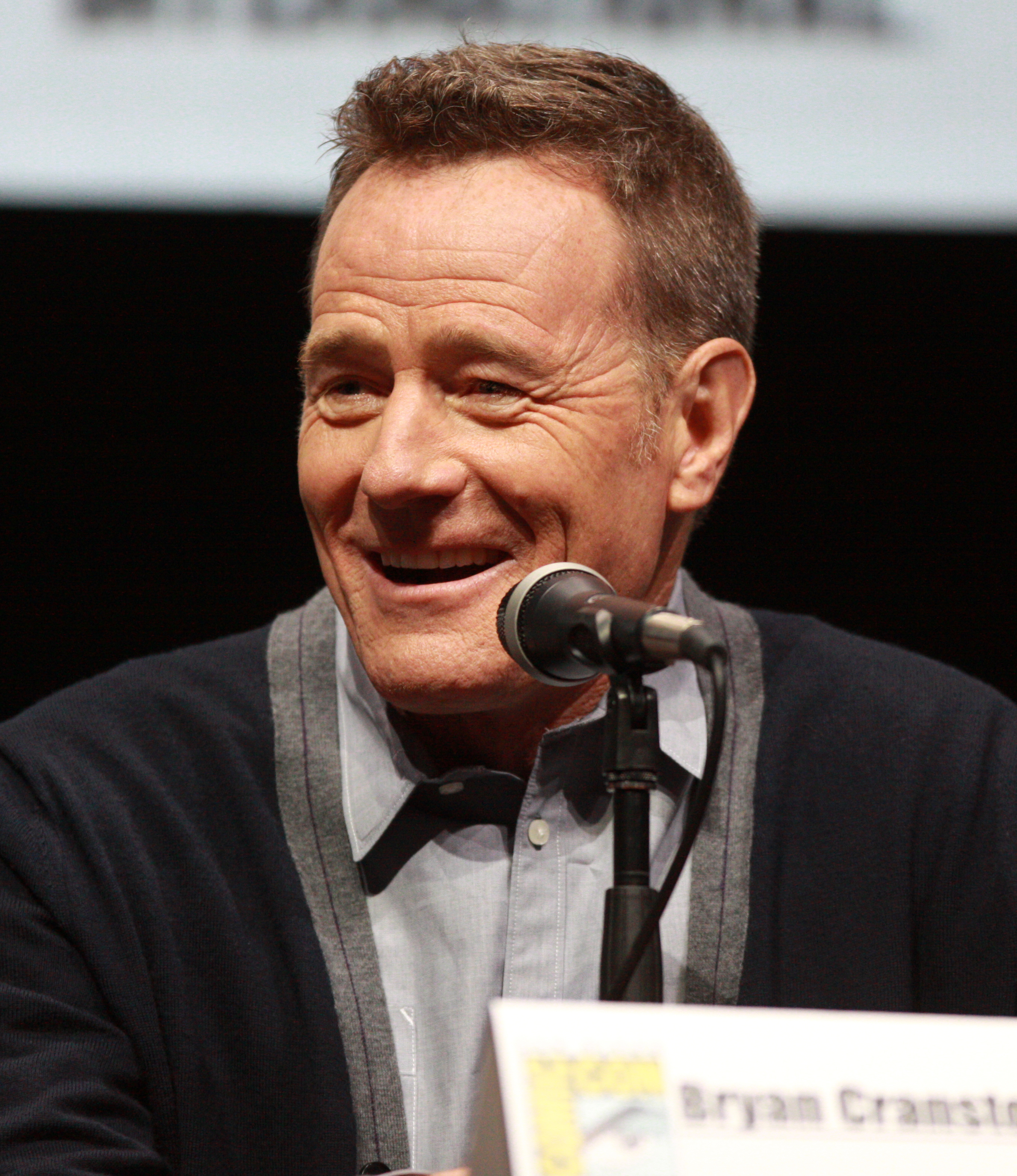
Bryan Cranston, Outstanding Lead Actor in a Drama Series winner

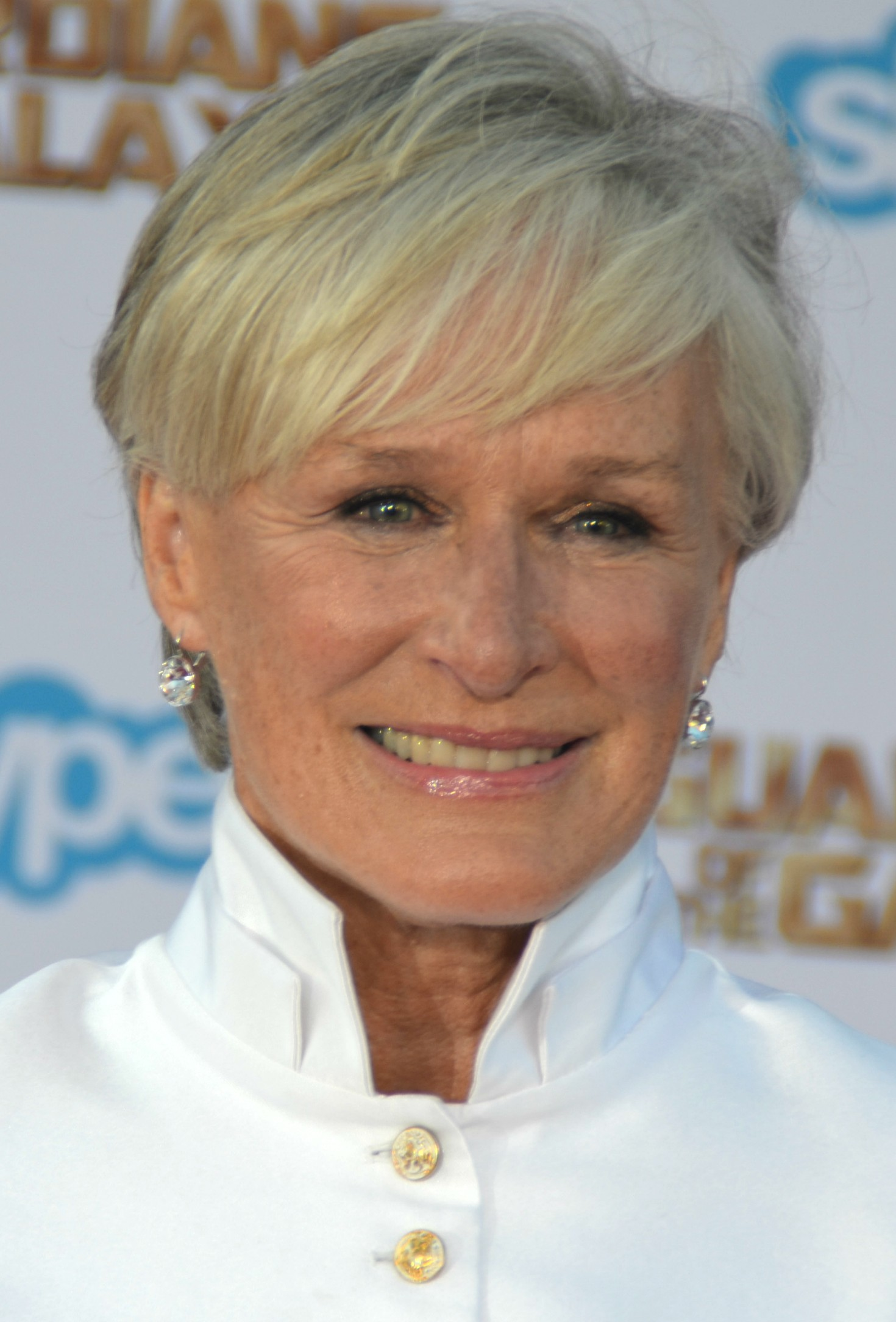
Glenn Close, Outstanding Lead Actress in a Drama Series winner

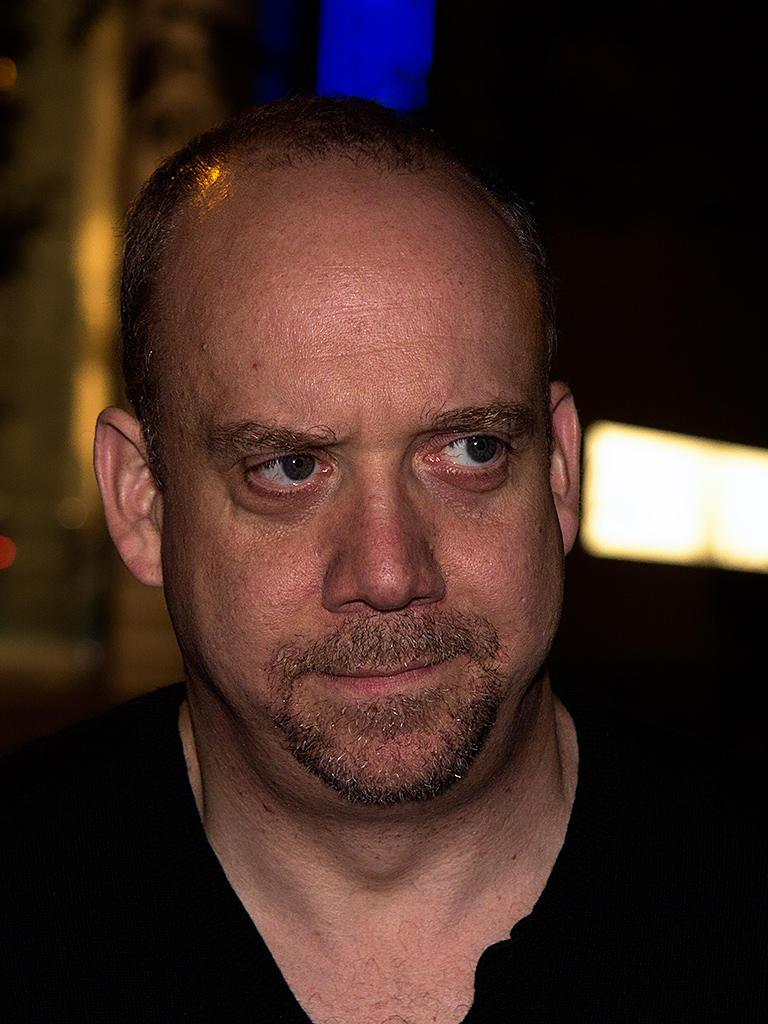
Paul Giamatti, Outstanding Lead Actor in a Miniseries or Movie winner

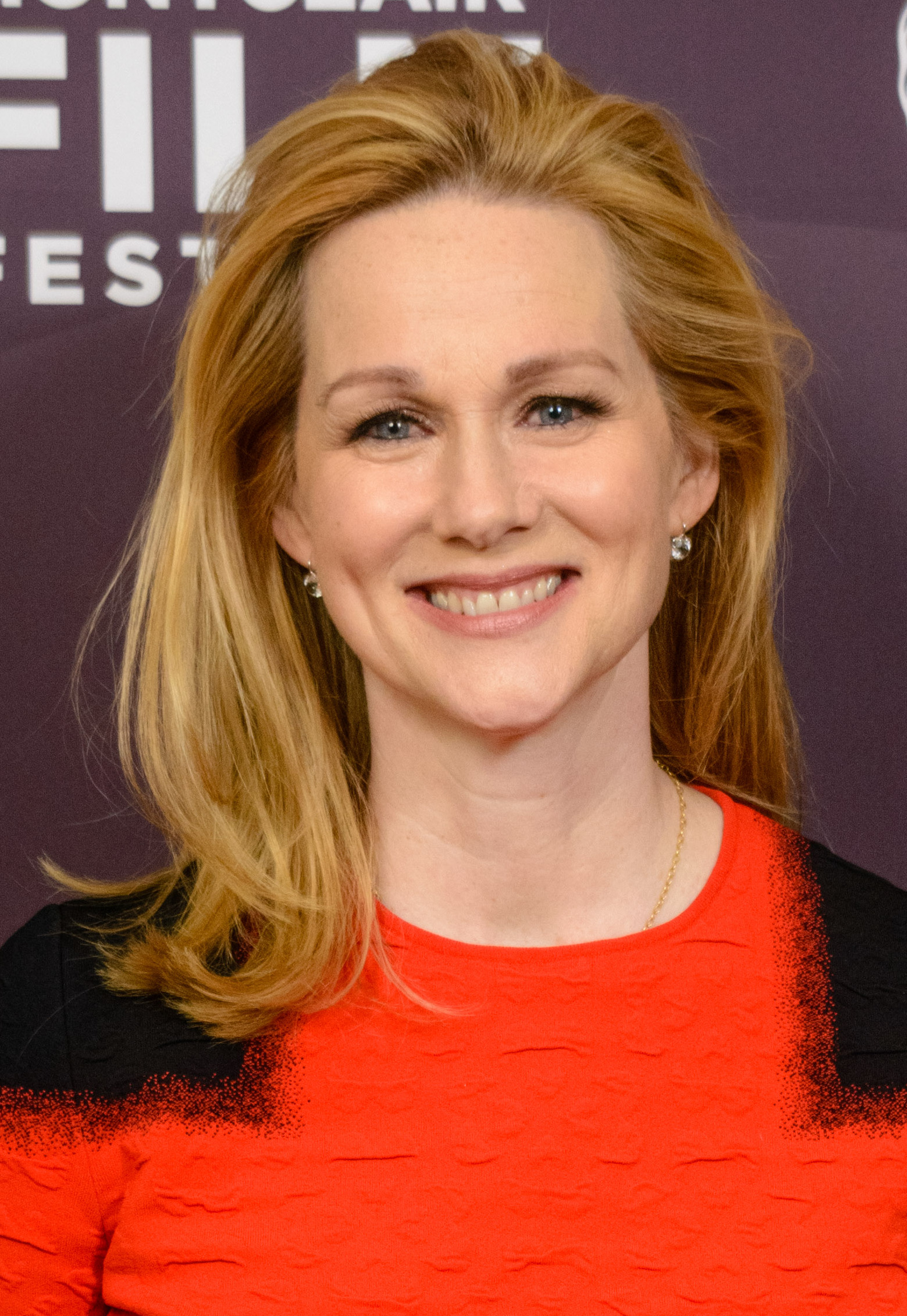
Laura Linney, Outstanding Lead Actress in a Miniseries or Movie winner

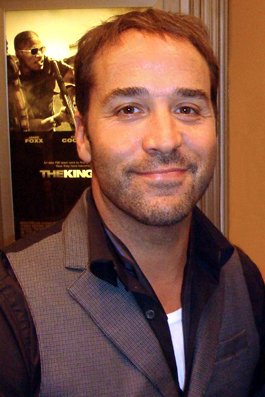
Jeremy Piven, Outstanding Supporting Actor in a Comedy Series winner

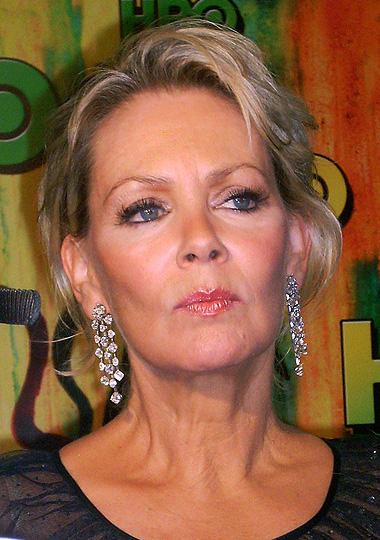
Jean Smart, Outstanding Supporting Actress in a Comedy Series winner

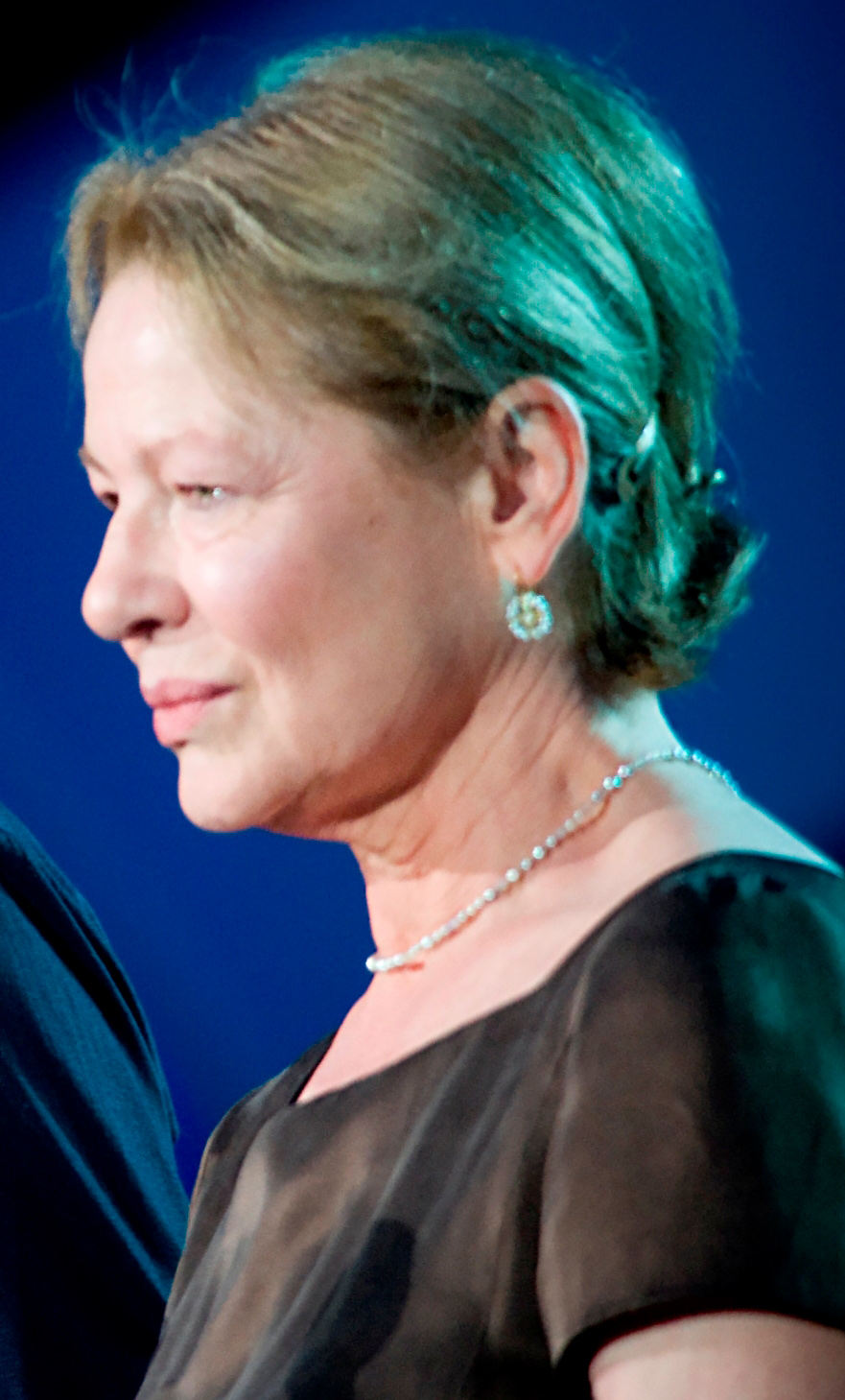
Dianne Wiest, Outstanding Supporting Actress in a Drama Series winner

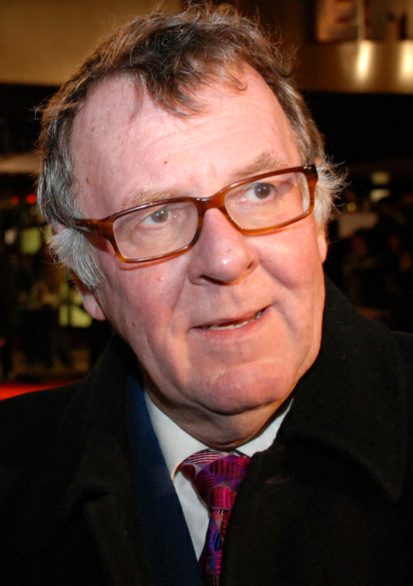
Tom Wilkinson, Outstanding Supporting Actor in a Miniseries or Movie winner

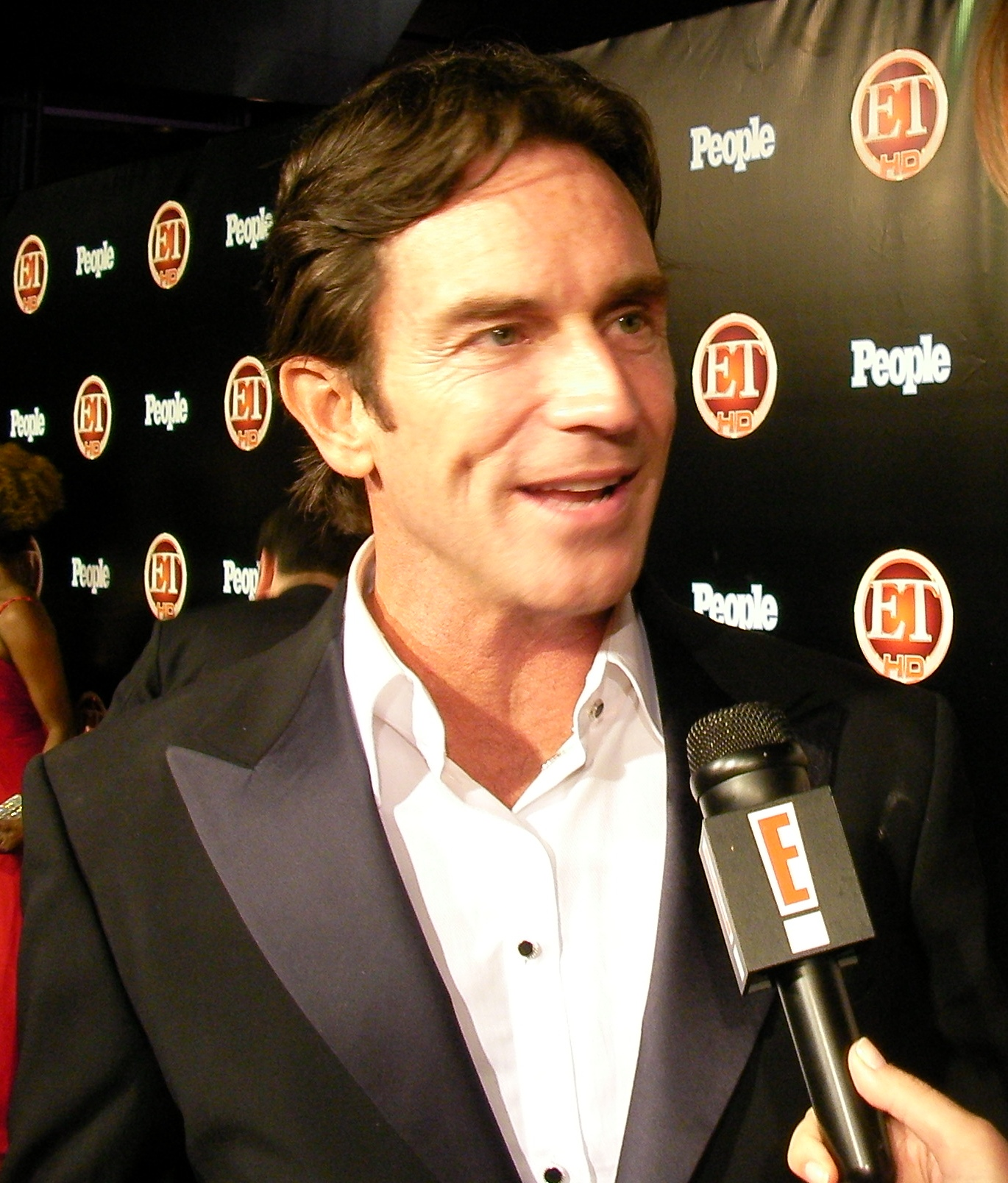
Jeff Probst, Outstanding Host for a Reality or Reality-Competition Program winner

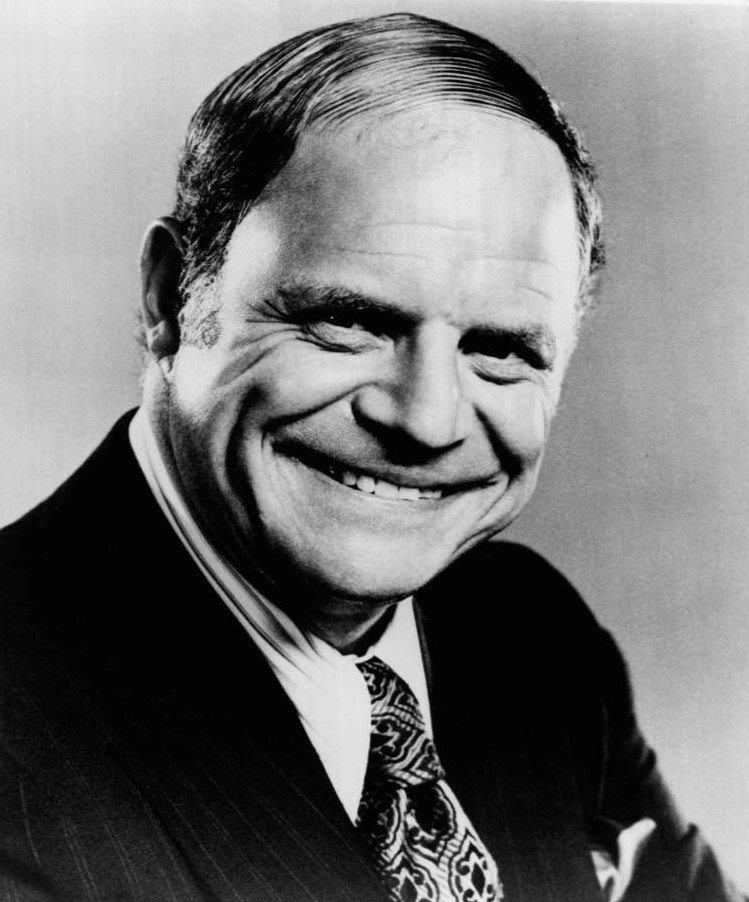
Don Rickles, Outstanding Individual Performance in a Variety or Music Program winner

=== Programs ===
Programs
**Outstanding Comedy Series**: **30 Rock (NBC)**; Curb Your Enthusiasm (HBO); Entourage (HBO); The Office (NBC); Two and a Half Men (CBS)	**Outstanding Drama Series**: **Mad Men (AMC)**; Boston Legal (ABC); Damages (FX); Dexter (Showtime); House (Fox); Lost (ABC)
**Outstanding Made for Television Movie**: **Recount (HBO)**; Bernard and Doris (HBO); Extras: The Extra Special Series Finale (HBO); The Memory Keeper's Daughter (Lifetime); A Raisin in the Sun (ABC)	**Outstanding Miniseries**: **John Adams (HBO)**; The Andromeda Strain (A&E); Cranford (PBS); Tin Man (Sci Fi)
**Outstanding Variety, Music or Comedy Series**: **The Daily Show with Jon Stewart (Comedy Central)**; The Colbert Report (Comedy Central); Late Show with David Letterman (CBS); Real Time with Bill Maher (HBO); Saturday Night Live (NBC)	**Outstanding Reality-Competition Program**: **The Amazing Race (CBS)**; American Idol (Fox); Dancing with the Stars (ABC); Project Runway (Bravo); Top Chef (Bravo)

=== Acting ===
==== Lead performances ====
Lead performances
**Outstanding Lead Actor in a Comedy Series**: **Alec Baldwin – 30 Rock as Jack Donaghy (NBC)**; Steve Carell – The Office as Michael Scott (NBC); Lee Pace – Pushing Daisies as Ned (ABC); Tony Shalhoub – Monk as Adrian Monk (USA); Charlie Sheen – Two and a Half Men as Charlie Harper (CBS)	**Outstanding Lead Actress in a Comedy Series**: **Tina Fey – 30 Rock as Liz Lemon (NBC)**; Christina Applegate – Samantha Who? as Samantha Newly (ABC); America Ferrera – Ugly Betty as Betty Suarez (ABC); Julia Louis-Dreyfus – The New Adventures of Old Christine as Christine Campbell (CBS); Mary-Louise Parker – Weeds as Nancy Botwin (Showtime)
**Outstanding Lead Actor in a Drama Series**: **Bryan Cranston – Breaking Bad as Walter White (AMC)**; Gabriel Byrne – In Treatment as Dr. Paul Weston (HBO); Michael C. Hall – Dexter as Dexter Morgan (Showtime); Jon Hamm – Mad Men as Don Draper (AMC); Hugh Laurie – House as Dr. Gregory House (Fox); James Spader – Boston Legal as Alan Shore (ABC)	**Outstanding Lead Actress in a Drama Series**: **Glenn Close – Damages as Patty Hewes (FX)**; Sally Field – Brothers & Sisters as Nora Walker (ABC); Mariska Hargitay – Law & Order: Special Victims Unit as Olivia Benson (NBC); Holly Hunter – Saving Grace as Grace Hanadarko (TNT); Kyra Sedgwick – The Closer as Brenda Leigh Johnson (TNT)
**Outstanding Lead Actor in a Miniseries or Movie**: **Paul Giamatti – John Adams as John Adams (HBO)**; Ralph Fiennes – Bernard and Doris as Bernard Lafferty (HBO); Ricky Gervais – Extras: The Extra Special Series Finale as Andy Millman (HBO); Kevin Spacey – Recount as Ron Klain (HBO); Tom Wilkinson – Recount as James Baker (HBO)	**Outstanding Lead Actress in a Miniseries or Movie**: **Laura Linney – John Adams as Abigail Adams (HBO)**; Judi Dench – Cranford as Matilda "Matty" Jenkyns (PBS); Catherine Keener – An American Crime as Gertrude Baniszewski (Showtime); Phylicia Rashad – A Raisin in the Sun as Lena Younger (ABC); Susan Sarandon – Bernard and Doris as Doris Duke (HBO)

==== Supporting performances ====
Supporting performances
**Outstanding Supporting Actor in a Comedy Series**: **Jeremy Piven – Entourage as Ari Gold (HBO)**; Jon Cryer – Two and a Half Men as Dr. Alan Harper (CBS); Kevin Dillon – Entourage as Johnny "Drama" Chase (HBO); Neil Patrick Harris – How I Met Your Mother as Barney Stinson (CBS); Rainn Wilson – The Office as Dwight Schrute (NBC)	**Outstanding Supporting Actress in a Comedy Series**: **Jean Smart – Samantha Who? as Regina Newly (ABC)**; Kristin Chenoweth – Pushing Daisies as Olive Snook (ABC); Amy Poehler – Saturday Night Live as various characters (NBC); Holland Taylor – Two and a Half Men as Evelyn Harper (CBS); Vanessa Williams – Ugly Betty as Wilhelmina Slater (ABC)
**Outstanding Supporting Actor in a Drama Series**: **Željko Ivanek – Damages as Ray Fiske (FX)**; Ted Danson – Damages as Arthur Frobisher (FX); Michael Emerson – Lost as Ben Linus (ABC); William Shatner – Boston Legal as Denny Crane (ABC); John Slattery – Mad Men as Roger Sterling Jr. (AMC)	**Outstanding Supporting Actress in a Drama Series**: **Dianne Wiest – In Treatment as Dr. Gina Toll (HBO)**; Candice Bergen – Boston Legal as Shirley Schmidt (ABC); Rachel Griffiths – Brothers & Sisters as Sarah Whedon (ABC); Sandra Oh – Grey's Anatomy as Dr. Christina Yang (ABC); Chandra Wilson – Grey's Anatomy as Dr. Miranda Bailey (ABC)
**Outstanding Supporting Actor in a Miniseries or Movie**: **Tom Wilkinson – John Adams as Benjamin Franklin (HBO)**; Bob Balaban – Recount as Benjamin Ginsberg (HBO); Stephen Dillane – John Adams as Thomas Jefferson (HBO); Denis Leary – Recount as Michael Whouley (HBO); David Morse – John Adams as George Washington (HBO)	**Outstanding Supporting Actress in a Miniseries or Movie**: **Eileen Atkins – Cranford as Deborah Jenkyns (PBS)**; Laura Dern – Recount as Katherine Harris (HBO); Ashley Jensen – Extras: The Extra Special Series Finale as Maggie Jacobs (HBO); Audra McDonald – A Raisin in the Sun as Ruth Younger (ABC); Alfre Woodard – Pictures of Hollis Woods as Edna Reilly (CBS)

==== Individual performances ====
Individual performances
**Outstanding Individual Performance in a Variety or Music Program**
- **Don Rickles – Mr. Warmth: The Don Rickles Project (HBO)**
  - Stephen Colbert – The Colbert Report (Comedy Central)
  - Tina Fey – Saturday Night Live (NBC)
  - David Letterman – Late Show with David Letterman (CBS)
  - Jon Stewart – The 80th Annual Academy Awards (ABC)

=== Hosting ===
Hosting
**Outstanding Host for a Reality or Reality-Competition Program**
- **Jeff Probst – Survivor (CBS)**
  - Tom Bergeron – Dancing with the Stars (ABC)
  - Heidi Klum – Project Runway (Bravo)
  - Howie Mandel – Deal or No Deal (NBC)
  - Ryan Seacrest – American Idol (Fox)

=== Directing ===
Directing
**Outstanding Directing for a Comedy Series**: **Pushing Daisies: "Pie-lette" – Barry Sonnenfeld (ABC)**; 30 Rock: "Rosemary's Baby" – Michael Engler (NBC); Entourage: "No Cannes Do" – Dan Attias (HBO); Flight of the Conchords: "Sally Returns" – James Bobin (HBO); The Office: "Goodbye, Toby" – Paul Feig (NBC); The Office: "Money" – Paul Lieberstein (NBC)	**Outstanding Directing for a Drama Series**: **House: "House's Head" – Greg Yaitanes (Fox)**; Boston Legal: "The Mighty Rogues" – Arlene Sanford (ABC); Breaking Bad: "Pilot" – Vince Gilligan (AMC); Damages: "Get Me a Lawyer" – Allen Coulter (FX); Mad Men: "Smoke Gets in Your Eyes" – Alan Taylor (AMC)
**Outstanding Directing for a Variety, Music or Comedy Program**: **The 80th Annual Academy Awards – Louis J. Horvitz (ABC)**; The Colbert Report – Jim Hoskinson (Comedy Central); Company (Great Performances) – Lonny Price (PBS); The Daily Show with Jon Stewart – Chuck O'Neil (Comedy Central); Saturday Night Live – Don Roy King (NBC)	**Outstanding Directing for a Miniseries, Movie or Dramatic Special**: **Recount – Jay Roach (HBO)**; Bernard and Doris – Bob Balaban (HBO); The Company – Mikael Salomon (TNT); Extras: The Extra Special Series Finale – Ricky Gervais and Stephen Merchant (HBO); John Adams – Tom Hooper (HBO)

=== Writing ===
Writing
**Outstanding Writing for a Comedy Series**: **30 Rock: "Cooter" – Tina Fey (NBC)**; 30 Rock: "Rosemary's Baby" – Jack Burditt (NBC); Flight of the Conchords: "Yoko" – James Bobin, Jemaine Clement, and Bret McKenzie (HBO); The Office: "Dinner Party" – Lee Eisenberg and Gene Stupnitsky (NBC); Pushing Daisies: "Pie-lette" – Bryan Fuller (ABC)	**Outstanding Writing for a Drama Series**: **Mad Men: "Smoke Gets in Your Eyes" – Matthew Weiner (AMC)**; Battlestar Galactica: "Six of One" – Michael Angeli (Sci Fi); Damages: "Get Me a Lawyer" – Glenn Kessler, Todd A. Kessler, and Daniel Zelman (FX); Mad Men: "The Wheel" – Robin Veith and Matthew Weiner (AMC); The Wire: "–30–" – David Simon and Ed Burns (HBO)
**Outstanding Writing for a Variety, Music or Comedy Program**: **The Colbert Report (Comedy Central)**; The Daily Show with Jon Stewart (Comedy Central); Late Night with Conan O'Brien (NBC); Late Show with David Letterman (CBS); Saturday Night Live (NBC)	**Outstanding Writing for a Miniseries, Movie or Dramatic Special**: **John Adams: "Independence" – Kirk Ellis (HBO)**; Bernard and Doris – Hugh Costello (HBO); Cranford – Heidi Thomas (PBS); Extras: The Extra Special Series Finale – Ricky Gervais and Stephen Merchant (HBO); Recount – Danny Strong (HBO)

== Most major nominations ==
Networks with multiple major nominations (Note: "Major" constitutes the categories listed above: Program, Acting, Directing, and Writing. Does not include the technical categories.)
Network	No. of Nominations
HBO	44
NBC	30
ABC	29
CBS	11

Programs with multiple major nominations
Program	Category	Network	No. of Nominations
John Adams	Miniseries	HBO	8
Recount	Movie	HBO	8
30 Rock	Comedy	NBC	6
Damages	Drama	FX	6
Mad Men	Drama	AMC	6
The Office	Comedy	NBC	6
Bernard and Doris	Movie	HBO	5
Boston Legal	Drama	ABC	5
Extras: The Extra Special Series Finale	Movie	HBO	5
Saturday Night Live	Variety	NBC	5
The Colbert Report	Variety	Comedy Central	4
Cranford	Miniseries	PBS	4
Entourage	Comedy	HBO	4
Pushing Daisies	Comedy	ABC	4
Two and a Half Men	Comedy	CBS	4
The Daily Show with Jon Stewart	Variety	Comedy Central	3
House	Drama	Fox	3
Late Show with David Letterman	Variety	CBS	3
A Raisin in the Sun	Movie	ABC	3
The 80th Annual Academy Awards	Variety	ABC	2
American Idol	Competition	Fox	2
Breaking Bad	Drama	AMC	2
Brothers & Sisters	Drama	ABC	2
Dancing with the Stars	Competition	ABC	2
Dexter	Drama	Showtime	2
Flight of the Conchords	Comedy	HBO	2
Great Performances	Variety	PBS	2
Grey's Anatomy	Drama	ABC	2
In Treatment	Drama	HBO	2
Lost	Drama	ABC	2
Project Runway	Competition	Bravo	2
Samantha Who?	Comedy	ABC	2
Ugly Betty	Comedy	ABC	2

== Most major awards ==
Networks with multiple major awards
Network	No. of Awards
HBO	10
NBC	4
ABC	3
AMC	3
CBS	2
Comedy Central	2
FX	2

Programs with multiple major awards
Program	Category	Network	No. of Awards
John Adams	Miniseries	HBO	5
30 Rock	Comedy	NBC	4
Damages	Drama	FX	2
Mad Men	Drama	AMC	2
Recount	Movie	HBO	2

== Presenters ==
The awards were presented by the following:

Name(s)	Role
Tina Fey; Amy Poehler	Presenters of the award for Outstanding Supporting Actor in a Comedy Series
Julia Louis-Dreyfus	Presenter of the award for Outstanding Supporting Actress in a Comedy Series
Marcia Cross; Dana Delany; Teri Hatcher; Felicity Huffman; Eva Longoria; Nicolette Sheridan	Presenters of the award for Outstanding Supporting Actor in a Drama Series
Ricky Gervais	Presenter of the award for Outstanding Directing for a Variety, Music or Comedy Program
Conan O'Brien	Presenter of the award for Outstanding Supporting Actress in a Drama Series
Steve Martin	Presenter of the award for Outstanding Writing for a Variety, Music or Comedy Program
Alec Baldwin	Presenter of the award for Outstanding Lead Actress in a Miniseries or Movie
Ruth Buzzi; Gary Owens; Alan Sues; Lily Tomlin; Jo Anne Worley	Presenters of the award for Outstanding Variety, Music or Comedy Series
David Boreanaz; Lauren Conrad	Introducers of Outstanding Guest Actress in a Comedy Series winner Kathryn Joosten
Kathryn Joosten	Presenter of the award for Outstanding Directing for a Comedy Series
David Boreanaz; Lauren Conrad	Presenters of the award for Outstanding Writing for a Comedy Series
Christina Applegate; Christian Slater	Presenters of the award for Outstanding Made for Television Movie
Laurence Fishburne; William Petersen	Presenters of the award for Outstanding Supporting Actor in a Miniseries or Movie
Stephen Colbert; Jon Stewart	Presenters of the awards for Outstanding Directing for a Miniseries, Movie or Dramatic Special and Outstanding Writing for a Miniseries, Movie or Dramatic Special
Patrick Dempsey; Sandra Oh	Presenters of the award for Outstanding Supporting Actress in a Miniseries or Movie
Kathy Griffin; Don Rickles	Presenters of the award for Outstanding Reality-Competition Program
Sally Field	Presenter of the award for Outstanding Miniseries
Kristin Chenoweth; Neil Patrick Harris	Presenters of the award for Outstanding Individual Performance in a Variety or Music Program
Wayne Brady; Kate Walsh	Introducers of Outstanding Guest Actor in a Drama Series winner Glynn Turman and Outstanding Guest Actress in a Drama Series winner Cynthia Nixon
Cynthia Nixon; Glynn Turman	Presenters of the award for Outstanding Directing for a Drama Series and Outstanding Writing for a Drama Series
Glenn Close	Presenter of the award for Outstanding Lead Actor in a Miniseries or Movie
Candice Bergen	Presenter of the award for Outstanding Lead Actor in a Comedy Series
America Ferrera; Vanessa Williams	Presenters of the award for Outstanding Lead Actress in a Drama Series
Kiefer Sutherland	Presenter of the award for Outstanding Lead Actor in a Drama Series
Craig Ferguson; Brooke Shields	Presenters of the award for Outstanding Lead Actress in a Comedy Series
Jimmy Kimmel	Presenter of the award for Outstanding Host for a Reality or Reality-Competition Program
Mary Tyler Moore; Betty White	Presenters of the award for Outstanding Comedy Series
Tom Selleck	Presenter of the award for Outstanding Drama Series

== In Memoriam ==
- George Carlin (twice)
- Bernie Brillstein
- Joey Bishop
- William F. Buckley Jr.
- Charlton Heston
- Les Crane
- Alice Ghostley
- Ivan Dixon
- Cyd Charisse
- Mel Ferrer
- Claudio Guzmán
- Barry Morse
- Deborah Kerr
- Larry Harmon
- Estelle Getty
- Roger King
- Sydney Pollack
- Ron Leavitt
- Bernie Mac
- Eric Lieber
- Suzanne Pleshette
- Abby Mann
- Dick Martin
- Delbert Mann
- Harvey Korman
- Jim McKay
- Lois Nettleton
- Mel Tolkin
- Richard Widmark
- Stan Winston
- Tim Russert
- Isaac Hayes
